= 2004 Skip Barber National Championship =

The 2004 Formula Dodge National Championship Presented by RACER was the 5th season of the Skip Barber National Championship. All drivers used the Skip Barber R/T 2000 chassis with 2-liter Dodge engines and BFGoodrich tires.

== Race calendar and results ==
Round	Circuit	Location	Date	Pole position	Fastest lap	Winning driver
1	Sebring International Raceway	(United States) Sebring, Florida	March 18	(United States) Gerardo Bonilla	(United States) Chris Prey	(United States) Benny Moon
2	Sebring International Raceway	(United States) Sebring, Florida	March 19	(Brazil) Victor Ramos	(United States) Benny Moon	(Brazil) Victor Ramos
3	Virginia International Raceway	(United States) Alton, Virginia	April 24	(United States) Gerardo Bonilla	(United States) Chris Prey	(United States) Benny Moon
4	Virginia International Raceway	(United States) Alton, Virginia	April 25	(Canada) Lorenzo Mandarino	(Canada) Lorenzo Mandarino	(United States) Chris Prey
5	Road America	(United States) Elkhart Lake, Wisconsin	May 22	(United States) Benny Moon	(Brazil) Victor Ramos	(Canada) Lorenzo Mandarino
6	Road America	(United States) Elkhart Lake, Wisconsin	May 23	(United States) Marco Andretti	(United States) Andrew Alfonso	(United States) Marco Andretti
7	Hallett Motor Racing Circuit	(United States) Tulsa, Oklahoma	June 4	(United States) Gerardo Bonilla	(United States) Gerardo Bonilla	(United States) Gerardo Bonilla
8	Hallett Motor Racing Circuit	(United States) Tulsa, Oklahoma	June 6	(United States) Gerardo Bonilla	(United States) Gerardo Bonilla	(Canada) Lorenzo Mandarino
9	Mosport International Raceway	(Canada) Bowmanville, Ontario	July 20	(United States) Benny Moon	(United States) Gerardo Bonilla	(United States) Robbie Pecorari
10	Mosport International Raceway	(Canada) Bowmanville, Ontario	July 21	(United States) Benny Moon	(United States) Marco Andretti	(United States) Benny Moon
11	Circuit Mont-Tremblant	(Canada) Mont-Tremblant, Quebec	July 24	(United States) Gerardo Bonilla	(United States) Mark Burt	(United States) Gerardo Bonilla
12	Circuit Mont-Tremblant	(Canada) Mont-Tremblant, Quebec	July 25	(United States) Robbie Pecorari	(United States) Marco Andretti	(United States) Gerardo Bonilla
13	Road America	(United States) Elkhart Lake, Wisconsin	August 7	(United States) Gerardo Bonilla	(Canada) Paul Albert	(United States) Gerardo Bonilla
14	Road America	(United States) Elkhart Lake, Wisconsin	August 8	(United States) Gerardo Bonilla	(United States) Marco Andretti	(United States) Benny Moon

== Final standings ==
Position	1st	2nd	3rd	4th	5th	6th	7th	8th	9th	10th	11th	12th	13th	14th	15th	16th+
Points	20	16	14	12	11	10	9	8	7	6	5	4	3	2	1	0

- The driver who qualified on pole was awarded one additional point.

Pos	Driver	(United States) SEB		(United States) VIR		(United States) ROA		(United States) HAL		(Canada) MOS		(Canada) MTT		(United States) ROA		Points
1	(United States) Marco Andretti	7	3	3	2	2	**1**	3	2	5	7	5	2	2	8	191
2	(United States) Gerardo Bonilla	**29**	6	**6**	3	3	3	**1**	**8**	3	10	**1**	1	**1**	**11**	182
3	(United States) Chris Prey	2	8	5	1	5	9	5	3	2	5	3	5	7	3	173
4	(United States) Benny Moon	1	5	1	5	**7**	6	12	6	**7**	**1**	7	4	12	1	172
5	(United States) Robbie Pecorari	4	2	13	7	6	16	4	4	1	2	2	**3**	17	5	152
6	(Brazil) Victor Ramos	3	**1**	4	11	4	2	9	5	4	13	4	7	14	9	143
7	(United States) John Edwards	16	26	10	8	9	5	11	10	9	8	6	8	4	4	100
8	(Canada) Lorenzo Mandarino			2	**16**	1	12	2	1	13	3	14	DNS	15	18	96
9	(United States) Mark Burt	19	13	11	19	8	14	10	12	6	4	8	6	18	2	84
10	(United States) Jeff Relic	23	15	8	6	10	7	13	15	8	9	10	11	8	7	81
11	(Mexico) Sergio Pérez	13	17	7	17	20	8	8	11	10	6	9	9	3	16	77
12	(United States) Jonathan Eriksen	20	21	15	9	17	17	15	14	12	11	13	10	10	13	39
13	(United States) Robin Warner	17	16	19	15	12	4	16	13	11	12					31
14	(United States) Harrison Brix	15	29	18	12	15	10	6	7							31
15	(United States) Matt Varsha	11	28	16	14	14	11	7	9							30
16	(United States) Jason Bowles	5	4													23
17	(United States) Andy Rossetto					13	19							9	6	20
18	(New Zealand) Chris Pither			9	4											19
19	(Canada) David Wieringa													5	12	15
20	(United States) Ron White	10	7													15
21	(United States) Richard Schmidt	8	9													15
22	(Costa Rica) Carlos Fonseca	6	12													14
23	(United States) Mark Patterson	9	20			11	15									13
24	(Canada) Paul Albert													6	14	12
25	(United States) John Pew	12	14	17	10	21	Wth									12
26	(United States) Andrew Alfonso	14	11	11	18	19	18									12
27	(United States) Brett Fenske	25	24											11	10	11
28	(United States) Blake Yager	27	19	14	13	16		14	16			12	13			11
29	(United States) Michael Yager											11	12			9
30	(United States) Seth Ingham	21	10													6
31	(United States) Louis Albornoz													13	17	3
32	(United States) Nolan Waak					18	13									3
33	(United States) Lucas McConnell													16	15	1
34	(United States) Matthew Koskinen	22	18													0
35	(United States) Dennis Hanratty, Jr.	18	23													0
36	(Canada) Olivier Comeau	24	22													0
37	(Hungary) Erik Ven	26	25													0
38	(United States) Billy Johnson	28	27													0

Color	Result
Gold	Winner
Silver	2nd place
Bronze	3rd place
Green	4th & 5th place
Light Blue	6th–10th place
Dark Blue	11th place or lower
Purple	Did not finish
Red	Did not qualify (DNQ)
Brown	Withdrawn (Wth)
Black	Disqualified (DSQ)
White	Did not start (DNS)
Blank	Did not participate (DNP)
Blank	Driver replacement (Rpl)
Blank	Injured (Inj)
Blank	No race held (NH)

**In-line notation**
**Bold**	Pole position (1 point)
Italics	Ran fastest race lap
