= Sergio Pérez =

Mexican racing driver (born 1990)

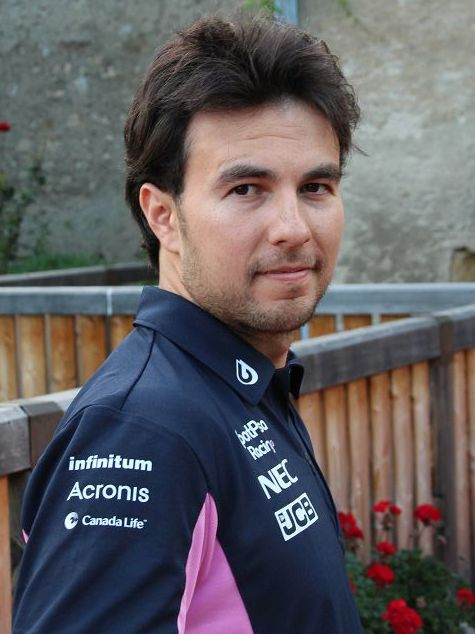
- Pérez in 2019
- Born: Sergio Michel Pérez Mendoza; 26 January 1990 (age 36); Guadalajara, Jalisco, Mexico
- Spouse: Carola Martínez (m. 2018)
- Children: 4
- Relatives: Antonio Pérez (brother)

Formula One World Championship career
- Nationality: (Mexico) Mexican
- 2026 team: Cadillac-Ferrari
- Car number: 11
- Entries: 306 (301 starts)
- Championships: 0
- Wins: 6
- Podiums: 39
- Career points: 1638
- Pole positions: 3
- Fastest laps: 12
- First entry: 2011 Australian Grand Prix
- First win: 2020 Sakhir Grand Prix
- Last win: 2023 Azerbaijan Grand Prix
- Last entry: 2026 Las Vegas Grand Prix

Previous series
- 2009–2010; 2008–2010; 2007–2008; 2006–2007; 2005–2006; 2004: GP2 Series; GP2 Asia Series; British F3; A1 Grand Prix; Formula BMW ADAC; Skip Barber National

Championship titles
- 2007: British F3 – National

Awards
- 2024: FIA Action of the Year
- Website: checoperez.com

Signature
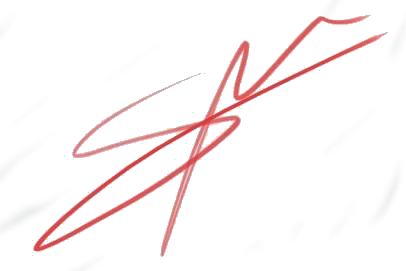

Sergio Michel "Checo" Pérez Mendoza (Latin American Spanish: [ˈseɾxjo ˈpeɾes]; born 26 January 1990) is a Mexican racing driver who competes in Formula One for Cadillac. Pérez was runner-up in the Formula One World Drivers' Championship in 2023 with Red Bull, and has won six Grands Prix across 15 seasons.

Born and raised in Guadalajara, Pérez began competitive kart racing aged six. Graduating to junior formulae in 2004, Pérez won his first championship in the national class of the 2007 British Formula 3 International Series. He progressed to the GP2 Series in 2009, finishing runner-up to Pastor Maldonado the following season with Addax. A member of the Ferrari Driver Academy from 2010 to 2012, Pérez signed for Sauber in 2011 to partner Kamui Kobayashi, making his Formula One debut at the Australian Grand Prix, where both were disqualified for an illegal rear wing. Pérez found greater success for the team in 2012, achieving his maiden podium finish in Malaysia, and repeating this feat in Canada and Italy. For the 2013 season, Pérez moved to McLaren, replacing Lewis Hamilton to partner Jenson Button. After a podium-less season for McLaren, Pérez signed with Force India in 2014. He scored five podiums with the team before their re-branding to Racing Point mid-way through the 2018 season.

Pérez placed fourth in the championship with Racing Point in 2020, taking his maiden win at the Sakhir Grand Prix, having been in last-place at the end of the first lap. Replaced by Sebastian Vettel at the re-branded Aston Martin for 2021, Pérez signed for Red Bull to partner Max Verstappen; he took his first victory for the team at the Azerbaijan Grand Prix. Pérez took further wins in 2022 at the Monaco and Singapore Grands Prix, amongst his maiden pole position in Saudi Arabia, finishing the season third overall. Pérez finished runner-up to Verstappen in the 2023 World Drivers' Championship, after additional victories in Saudi Arabia and Azerbaijan. Following a winless 2024 campaign, Pérez and Red Bull mutually agreed to terminate his contract, having contributed to two World Constructors' Championships. He returned with Cadillac in 2026.

Pérez has achieved six race wins, three pole positions, 12 fastest laps and 39 podiums in Formula One. He holds the Formula One records for the most starts before a race win (190) and the most races before a pole position (219). Pérez is contracted to remain at Cadillac until at least the end of the 2029 season.

== Early and personal life ==
Sergio Michel Pérez Mendoza was born on 26 January 1990 in Guadalajara, Jalisco. Pérez is the youngest child of Antonio Pérez Garibay and Marilú Mendoza de Pérez; he also has an older sister Paola and an older brother Antonio, a retired stock car racing driver who competed in the NASCAR Mexico Series. Pérez is married to Carola Martínez Galindo, and they have four children: two sons and two daughters. Pérez is Catholic.

Both Pérez brothers are association football fans, stating that they thought about leaving car racing to play professionally. The brothers are friends of Mexican footballer Javier Hernández. In an interview in 2012 for the official Formula One website, Pérez revealed that if he had not been a driver he would have liked to have been a lawyer.

== Junior racing career ==
=== Karting ===
Pérez began his career in karting at the age of six in 1996. In his first year of competition he achieved four victories in the junior category and claimed the runner-up spot in the category. In 1997, he participated in the karting Youth Class, where he was the youngest driver in the category and earned a win and five podium finishes and finished fourth in the championship.

The following year, Pérez returned to compete in the junior category; he achieved eight wins and became the youngest driver to become champion of the category. He also participated in several races in Shifter 125cc and competed in Master Kadets, where he finished on the podium.

In 1999, Pérez raced in the 80cc Shifter category, taking three wins and finishing third in the championship. He also became the youngest driver to win a competition in the category, after obtaining special permission from the Federation to participate in the 80cc Shifter.

In 2000, Pérez raced in the Shifter 80cc Championship and also participated in three races in the Shifter 125cc category, which was part of the Telmex Challenge. The following year saw him become the youngest driver to compete in the 125cc Shifter Regional category. By now, his achievements were bringing him to the attention of scouts for Escuderia Telmex.

With six wins in 2002, Pérez finished as the national runner-up in the Shifter 125cc category, and participated in the global race Shifter 80cc, in Las Vegas, where he qualified fifth and finished in 11th place.

In 2003, Pérez was leading both championships in the 125cc category but withdrew from the last seven races, which proved to be a disappointment in his title aspirations. However, he finished in third place in Telmex Challenge, in addition to being Cup runner-up in Mexico. In the same year, he was also invited to attend the Easy Kart 125 Shootout, where he competed against drivers from around the world and won the race, again as the youngest driver.

=== Skip Barber ===
Pérez competed in the US-based Skip Barber National Championship in 2004. Driving for a team sponsored by Mexican telecommunications company Telmex, he finished eleventh in the championship.

=== Formula BMW ===
Pérez moved to Europe in 2005 to compete in the German Formula BMW ADAC series. He was allowed to live in a restaurant owned by his team manager for four months. He finished fourteenth in the championship, driving for 4speed Media, and improved to sixth position the following year.

=== A1 Grand Prix ===
In the 2006–07 A1 Grand Prix season, Pérez took part in a single round of the championship for A1 Team Mexico. He was the third-youngest driver to take part in the series.

=== Formula Three ===
Pérez switched to the British Formula 3 Championship for 2007. Pérez relocated his residence to Oxford. He competed in the National Class – for older chassis – with the T-Sport team, winning the championship by a comfortable margin. In the process, he won two-thirds of the races and a similar proportion of pole positions, and finished all but two races on the podium.

For 2008, Pérez and T-Sport graduated to the premier International Class of the championship, where he was one of the few drivers to be equipped with a Mugen Honda engine. After leading the championship early in the season, he eventually finished fourth in the drivers' standings.

=== GP2 Series ===
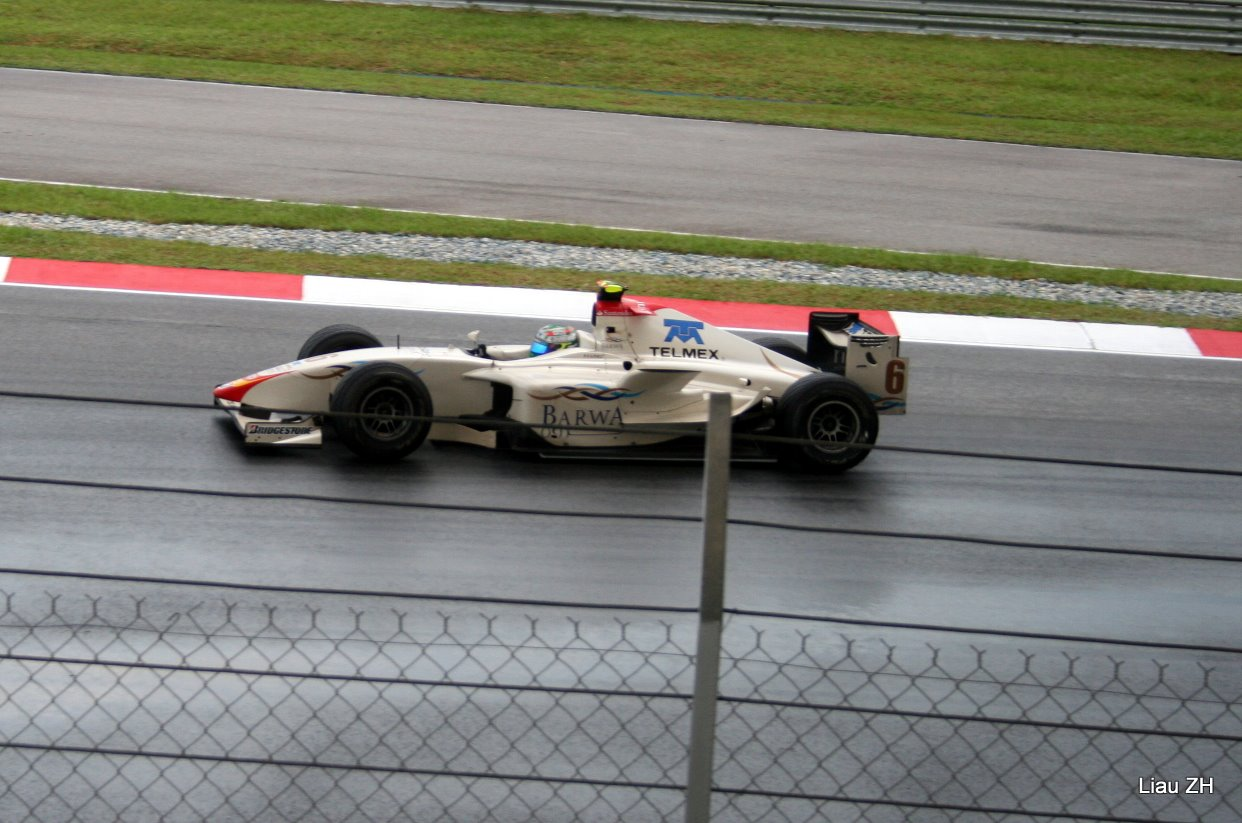
Pérez driving for Campos Grand Prix in the 2008–09 GP2 Asia Series

Pérez drove for the Campos Grand Prix team in the 2008–09 GP2 Asia Series, partnering Russian driver Vitaly Petrov. He was the first Mexican driver to compete at this level of motorsport since Giovanni Aloi took part in International Formula 3000 in 1990. He won his first GP2 Asia Series race at Sakhir, winning from lights-to-flag in the sprint race having started from pole position. He added a second win at Losail, during the sprint race of the night meeting in Qatar.

Pérez moved to Arden International for the main 2009 GP2 Series, driving alongside fellow Formula Three graduate Edoardo Mortara. Pérez finished twelfth in the standings, with a best result of second coming at Valencia. In the off-season, he contested two rounds of the 2009–10 GP2 Asia Series for Barwa Addax, ahead of a 2010 main series campaign with the team. He won five races, and finished second in the standings behind Pastor Maldonado.

== Formula One career ==
=== Sauber (2011–2012) ===
==== 2011: Debut season ====
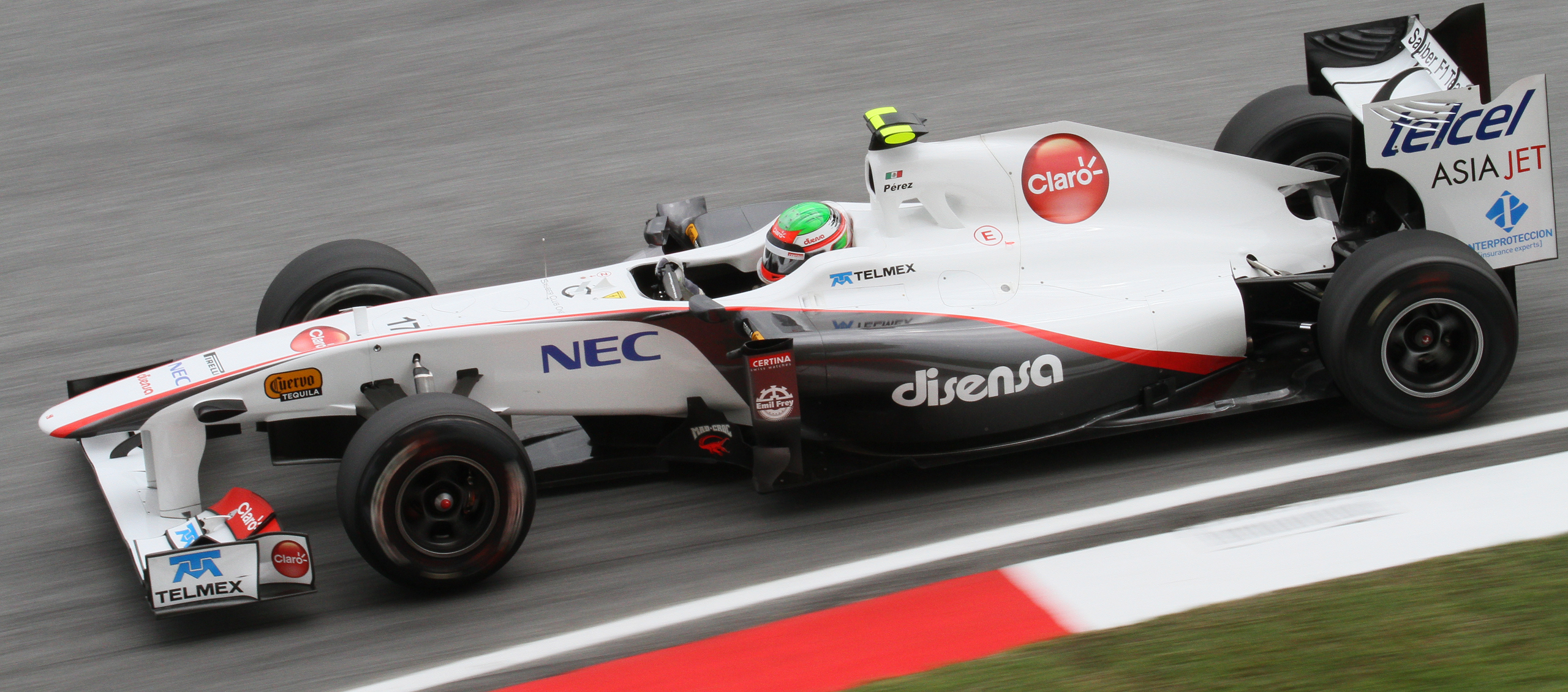
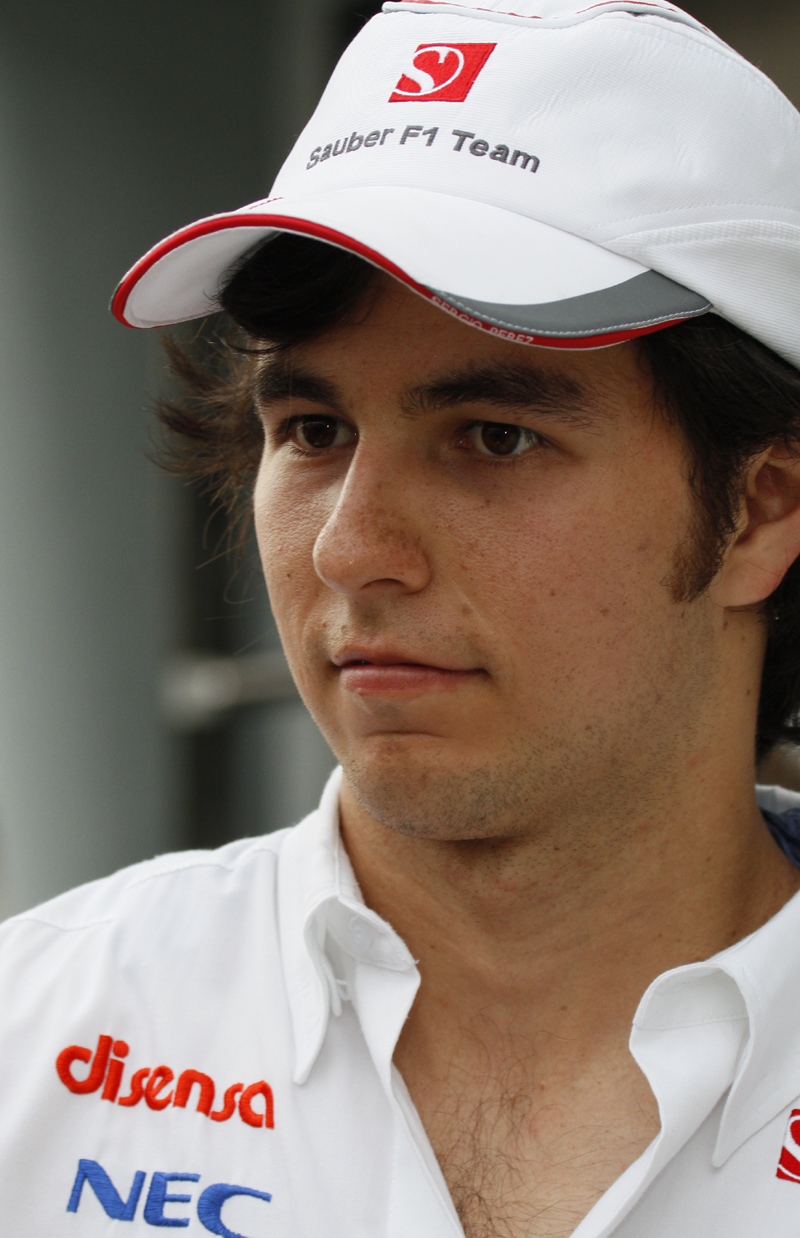
Sergio Perez during the 2011 Malaysian Grand Prix

On 4 October 2010, Sauber announced that Pérez would join the team in 2011, replacing Nick Heidfeld. Sauber subsequently announced a partnership with Pérez's sponsor Telmex. He became the fifth Mexican to compete in Formula One, and the first since Héctor Rebaque competed between 1977 and 1981. He also became a member of the Ferrari Driver Academy scheme in October 2010.

Pérez finished seventh in his first race, the Australian Grand Prix, impressing observers by stopping to change tyres only once, becoming the only driver in the field to make fewer than two stops. However, both Sauber cars were subsequently disqualified for infringing technical regulations. He failed to repeat the result in Malaysia where body parts flew off Sébastien Buemi's Toro Rosso car and into the electrical system of Pérez's Sauber, forcing his retirement. The Chinese Grand Prix saw him start in 12th position and he struggled during the race as well as making contact with several drivers en route to 17th. He followed that up with fourteenth in Turkey, before a ninth-place finish in Spain – ahead of teammate Kamui Kobayashi in tenth – to take his first Formula One points.

During the third part of qualifying for the Monaco Grand Prix, Pérez lost control of his car upon exiting the circuit's tunnel section, swung to the right and crashed into the barrier, before sliding across the chicane and hitting the TecPro barrier with a heavy side impact. He was seen holding his hands around his head in an attempt to protect it just before the final impact. The session was suspended, and marshals and medical personnel extricated Pérez from his car. A Sauber team spokesman said that he was conscious and able to talk after the accident, and had been taken to the circuit's medical centre. He suffered a sprained thigh and concussion, and did not take part in the race the following day, on medical grounds. After taking part in the first practice session of the Canadian Grand Prix, Pérez did not feel well enough and decided not to take any further part, and was replaced by Pedro de la Rosa.

Pérez returned for the European Grand Prix and finished eleventh after attempting to run the race on a one-stop strategy. He took a career-best seventh at the British Grand Prix and eleventh in Germany. After a fifteenth place in Hungary, he retired in Belgium with suspension failure. This was followed by a gearbox failure while running seventh in Italy, before he scored a point in Singapore after losing ninth place to Felipe Massa. In Japan he took eighth place, before a sixteenth-place finish in Korea, tenth in India, and an eleventh-place finish in Abu Dhabi. He finished sixteenth in the Drivers' Championship with fourteen points.

On 28 July, it was announced that Pérez would remain with Sauber into the 2012 season, alongside teammate Kobayashi. On 13 September, Pérez tested for Ferrari as part of the Ferrari Driver Academy in a Ferrari F60, Ferrari's car from the 2009 season. Pérez conducted the test with fellow academy member Jules Bianchi.

==== 2012: Maiden podiums ====
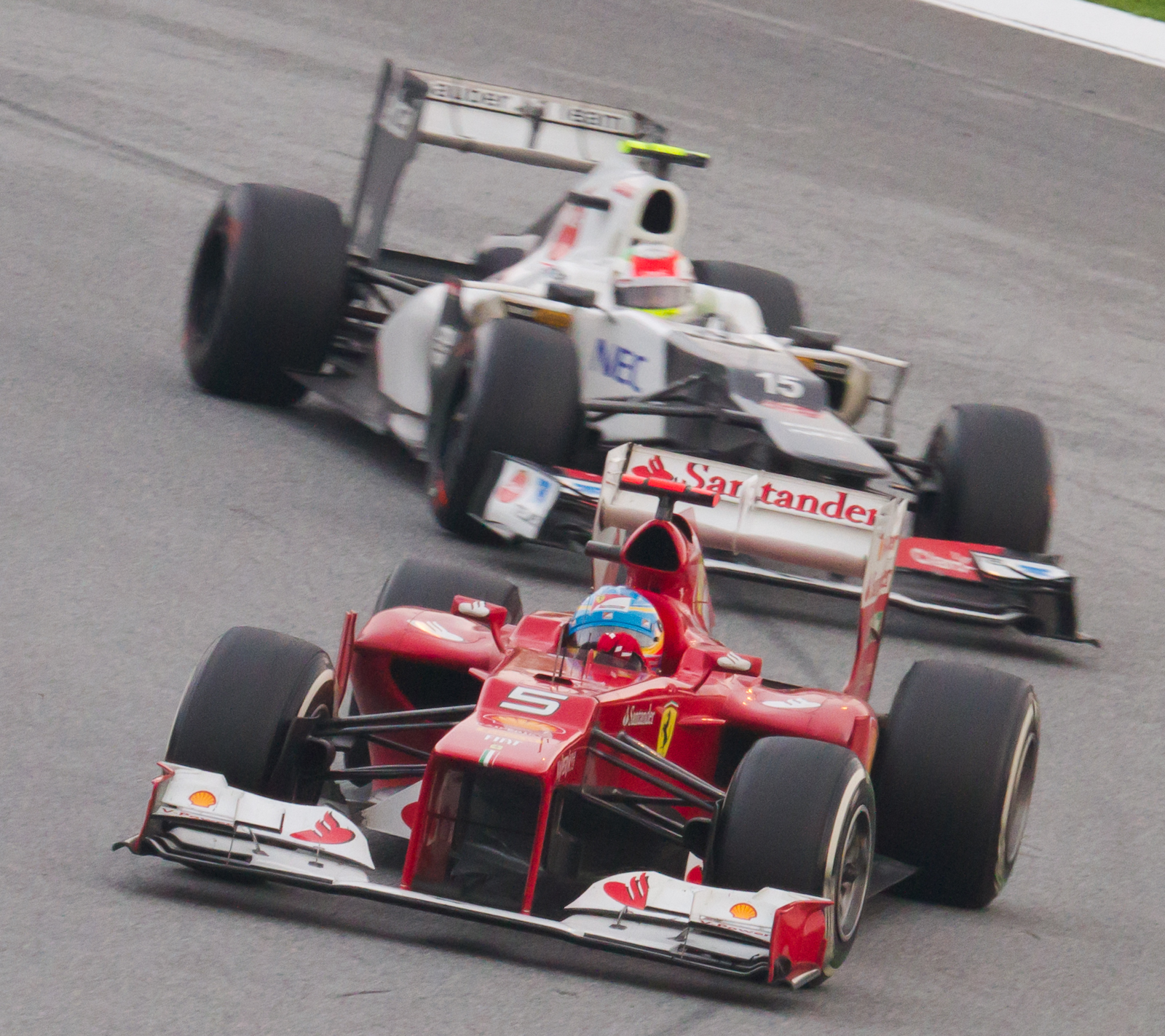
Pérez chasing Alonso for the lead of the 2012 Malaysian Grand Prix, where he achieved his first podium in Formula One

Pérez started the season with eighth place at the Australian Grand Prix, losing several places on the final lap due to excessively-worn tyres. In the second round at Malaysia, he went on to battle with Fernando Alonso for the win. In the dying laps of the race he was able to close the gap to 0.5 seconds, but was not able to make the pass as he went wide at turn 14 and fell back, finishing 2.2 seconds behind Alonso in second. Many observers praised his performance despite his late-race error, taking Sauber's best result as an independent team. This drive won him plaudits and fuelled speculation of a move to Ferrari in the near future. However, Pérez later told reporters that he expected to stay with Sauber until at least the end of the 2012 season.

At the 2012 Chinese Grand Prix, Pérez qualified a career-best eighth, but finished the race in eleventh place after problems with pit strategy and his car's clutch. He finished outside the points in the next three races – despite recording the fastest lap in Monaco, before Pérez achieved his second career podium at the Canadian Grand Prix, finishing the race in third place, having started fifteenth.

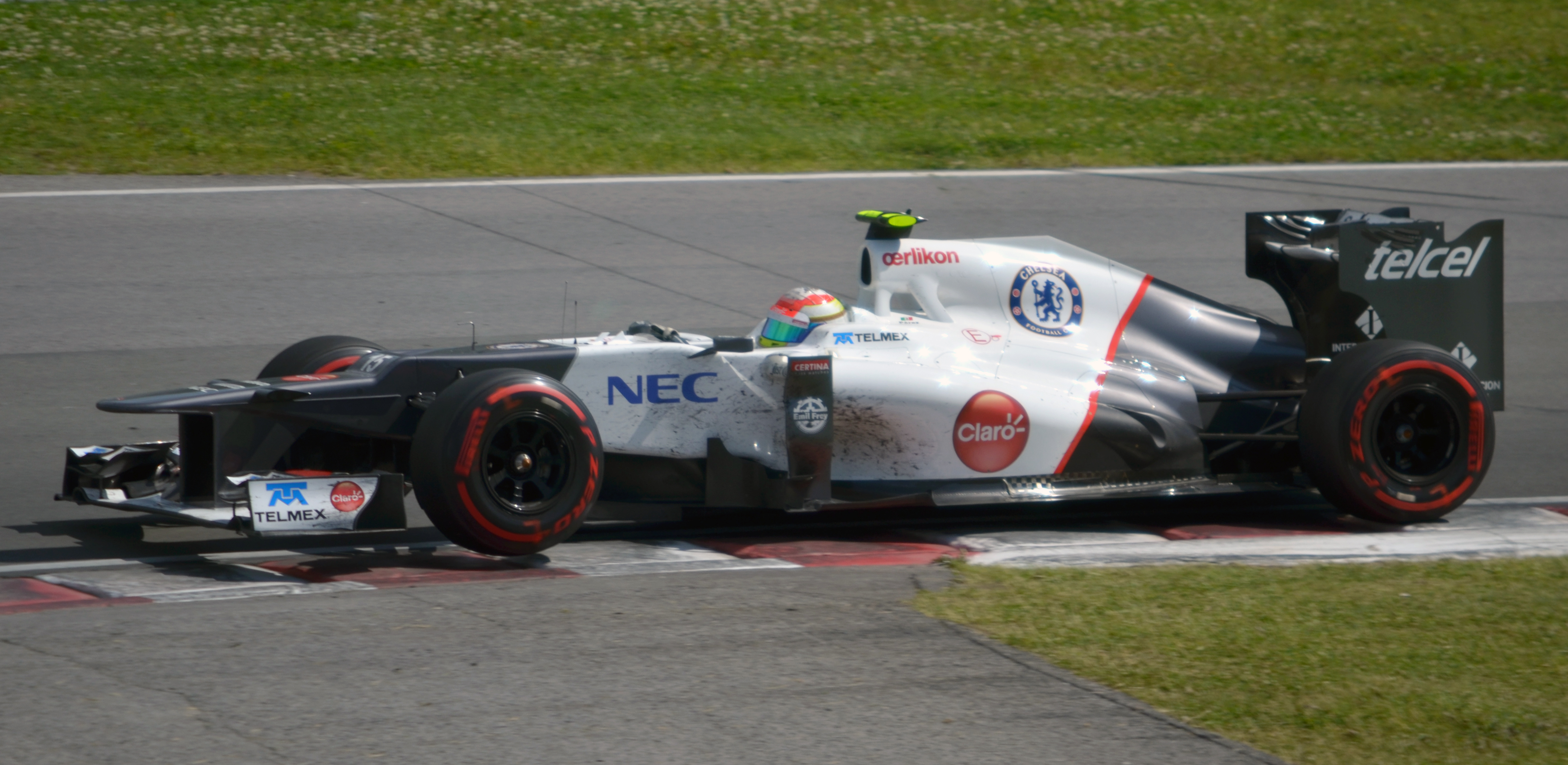
Pérez on his way to third place in the 2012 Canadian Grand Prix, his second podium finish

In the European Grand Prix, Pérez qualified in fifteenth place, citing a handling imbalance and the car feeling "unpredictable" as reasons for the gap to Kobayashi in seventh. He improved to ninth place in the race, but raised poor qualifying form as an issue for the team. On lap 12 of the British Grand Prix, he collided with Pastor Maldonado, forcing him to retire with broken suspension. He later criticised Maldonado, claiming "Everybody has concerns about him" before adding, "He is a driver who doesn't know that we are risking our lives and has no respect at all". Maldonado received a double penalty in the form of a reprimand and a €10,000 fine after the race. Pérez later added: "Just look at the last races. He ruined [Lewis] Hamilton's race (in Valencia), he ruined my race in Monaco by doing stupid things. I don't understand why the stewards don't take a serious decision with him. With Pastor they're not doing anything that will teach him a lesson."

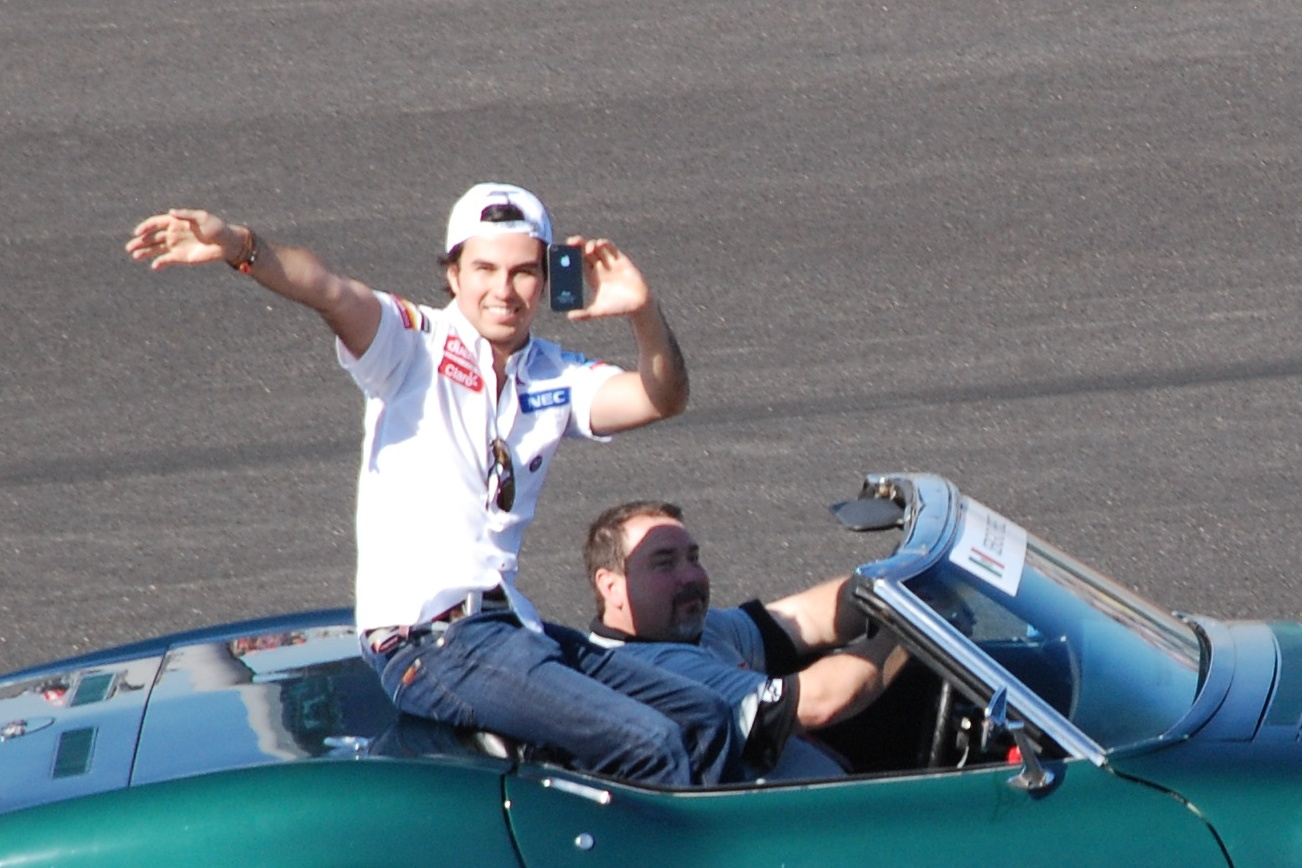
Pérez at the 2012 United States Grand Prix

For the German Grand Prix, Pérez started in 17th position but was able to make his way through the field, and ultimately finished the race in 6th place. At the Belgian Grand Prix, he made it into Q3 and qualified fifth fastest. A penalty for Maldonado subsequently promoted Pérez to a career-best fourth on the grid. In the race, he was forced to retire in the first turn of the first lap after Romain Grosjean caused a spectacular accident. Grosjean crashed his car into Lewis Hamilton creating a domino effect which involved five cars. Also involved in the accident were, the championship leader Fernando Alonso and Pérez's teammate Kamui Kobayashi.

Pérez took his third podium at the Italian Grand Prix. On Saturday, he failed to qualify for Q3 and was twelfth on the grid. On Sunday, he climbed through the field to second place, passing on track, among others, Kimi Räikkönen, Nico Rosberg, Felipe Massa and Alonso. Unlike most of the drivers in the field, Pérez started the race on hard tyres and changed to the medium tyres on lap 29, allowing him to lead the Grand Prix for five laps. As a result, Pérez and his car's outstanding tyre management got him well into the points, and ultimately, to a podium finish. Ultimately, he finished the season in tenth place in the Drivers' Championship with 66 points, 6 more than teammate Kobayashi.

With his success at Sauber, Pérez was referred to as "The Mexican Wunderkind".

=== McLaren (2013) ===
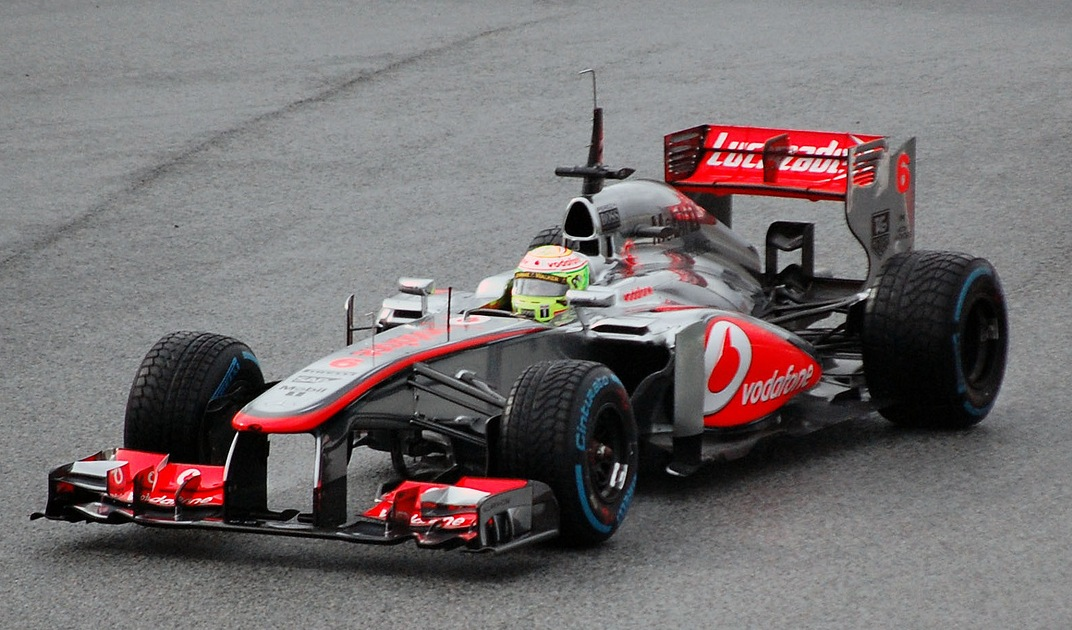
Pérez in the MP4-28 during winter tests at Jerez, in 2013

On 28 September 2012, Lewis Hamilton's decision to leave McLaren for Mercedes in 2013 was announced, and Pérez was subsequently confirmed as Hamilton's replacement. He also replaced Hamilton in McLaren's cartoon Tooned. This also ended Pérez' association with Ferrari, as he was released from its driver academy.

In the season-opening race in Australia, Pérez qualified 15th and finished in 11th position, later describing the weekend as "difficult" for himself and the team as a whole. He started the Malaysian Grand Prix from ninth on the grid, and finished the race in the same position, scoring his first points for McLaren. He also achieved the fastest lap of the race, having pitted for fresh tyres.

In the Bahrain Grand Prix, Pérez started 12th on the grid and finished 6th ahead of Ferrari's Fernando Alonso (eighth) and his teammate Jenson Button (tenth), with whom he had a fierce duel in which they touched on a couple of occasions, increasing the competition between drivers in McLaren on the following races.

After the Bahrain Grand Prix, Jenson Button said of Pérez's driving style:

I've raced with many team-mates over the years and with quite an aggressive team-mate in Lewis, but I'm not used to driving down the straight and then my team-mate coming along and wiggling his wheels at me and banging wheels with me at 300km/h. I've had some tough fights in F1 but not quite as dirty as that. That's something you do in karting and normally you grow out of it but that's obviously not the case with Checo [Pérez]. Soon something serious will happen so he has to calm down. He's extremely quick and he did a great job today but some of it is unnecessary and an issue when you are doing those speeds.

— Jenson Button speaking to ESPN about Pérez after the 2013 Bahrain Grand Prix

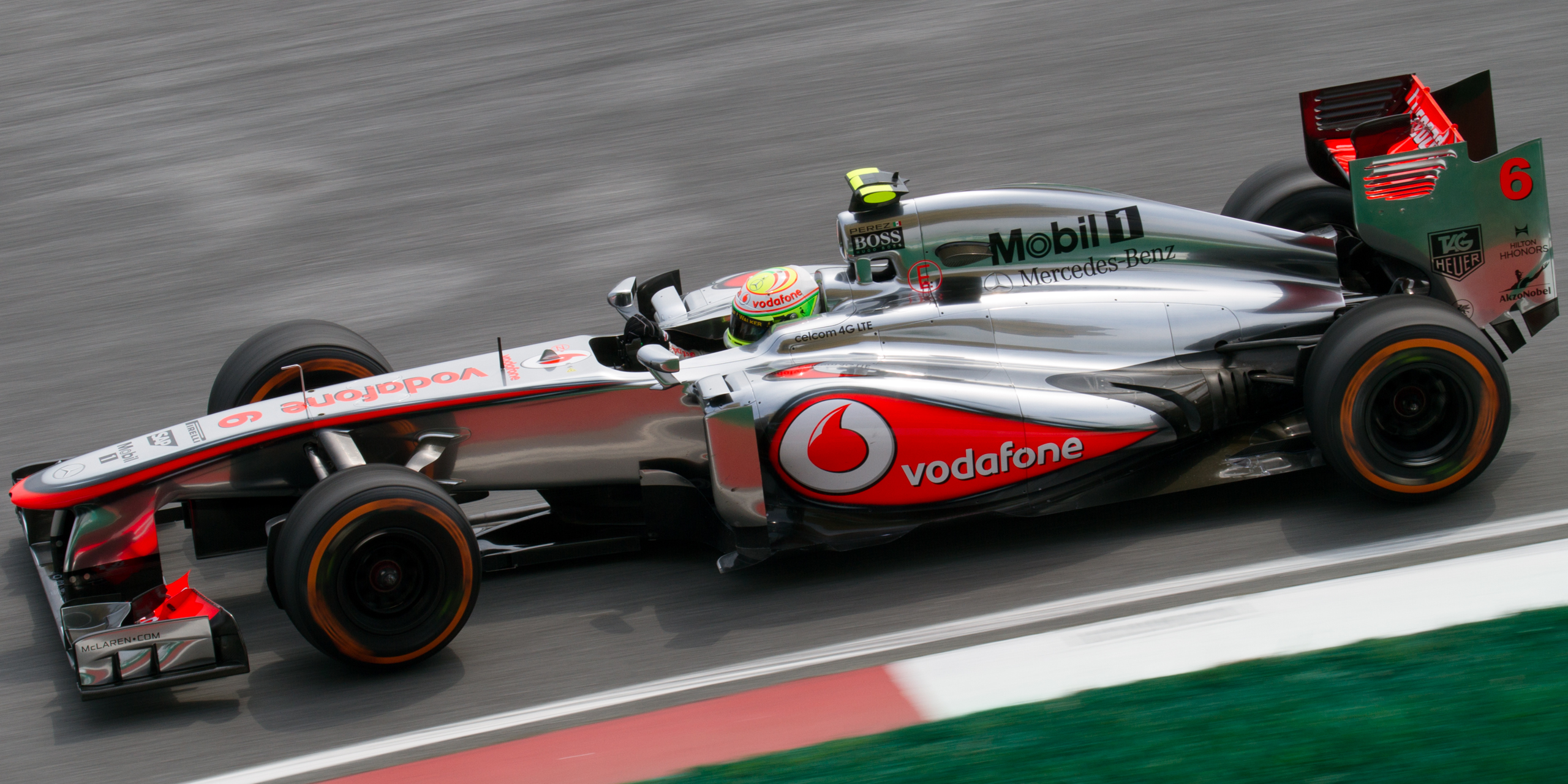
Pérez at the 2013 Malaysian Grand Prix

At the 2013 Monaco Grand Prix, Pérez performed several aggressive overtaking moves, before retiring after colliding with Kimi Räikkönen. Following the incident Räikkönen said that Pérez should be "punched in the face". Pérez recorded a season-best fifth-place finish in India, finishing four seconds shy of the podium, a result that left him "extremely satisfied".

Pérez confirmed on 13 November 2013 that he would be leaving McLaren at the end of the season to be replaced by Kevin Magnussen.

=== Force India / Racing Point (2014–2020) ===
==== 2014 ====
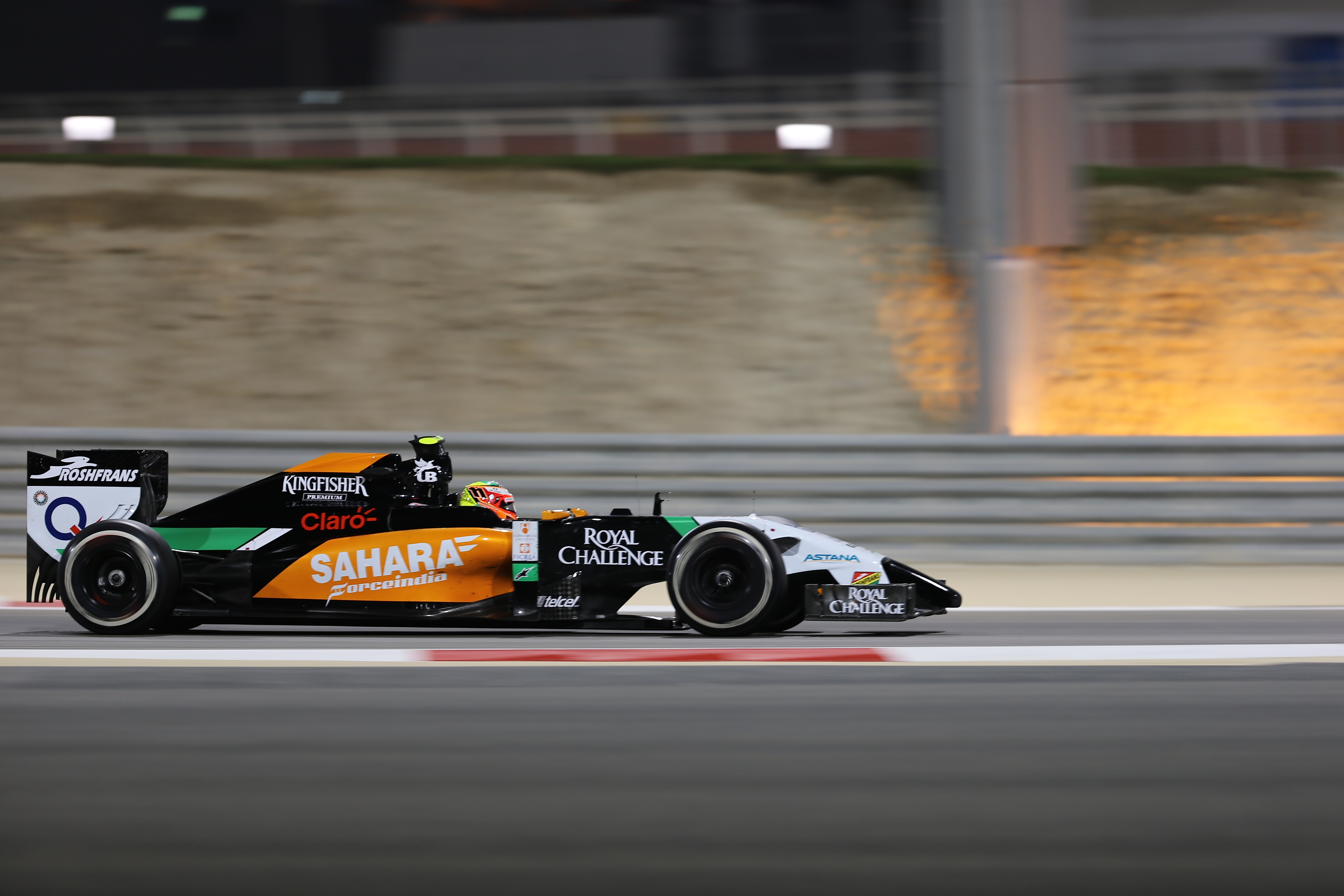
Pérez at the 2014 Bahrain Grand Prix where he achieved his first podium finish since the 2012 season, with third place in the race

On 12 December 2013, exactly one month after it was announced he would leave McLaren, Force India confirmed that Pérez would join Nico Hülkenberg in their driver line-up for 2014 in a 15 million Euro deal.

In the Australian Grand Prix, Pérez finished 11th but was moved up to tenth to get his first point for Force India due to Daniel Ricciardo being disqualified for breaching fuel limits. He failed to start the Malaysian Grand Prix, after his car encountered gearbox issues before the start of the race. Nevertheless, a week later in the Bahrain Grand Prix, he was able to score Force India's first podium since 2009, holding off Ricciardo's Red Bull for a third-place finish. At the Chinese Grand Prix, Pérez started 16th and after gaining four places at the start, was able to overtake both McLarens and Daniil Kvyat's Toro Rosso to finish ninth. Out-qualifying his teammate for a second time, Pérez started in the tenth position for the Monaco Grand Prix. However, a first-lap collision with Jenson Button meant an early retirement for the first time in the season. At the Canadian Grand Prix, Pérez was again fighting for another podium finish until the car suffered braking issues, later resulting in losing the third-place position to both Red Bulls. On the last lap, he was involved in a collision with Felipe Massa, who crashed into the back of his Force India sending both cars heavily into the barriers. Pérez was subsequently given a five-place grid penalty for the next race, as the stewards decided he changed his racing line, causing Massa to crash into him. At the Austrian Grand Prix, Pérez set his third fastest lap of his career whilst also giving Force India their third fastest lap in their history.

On 7 November 2014, before the Brazilian Grand Prix, Force India announced that Pérez would remain with the team for the 2015 season. Pérez stated that contract negotiations were "ongoing", in regards to a further contract extension. The deal was officially confirmed at the Abu Dhabi Grand Prix, with Pérez signing a new two-year contract, until the end of the 2016 season.

==== 2015 ====
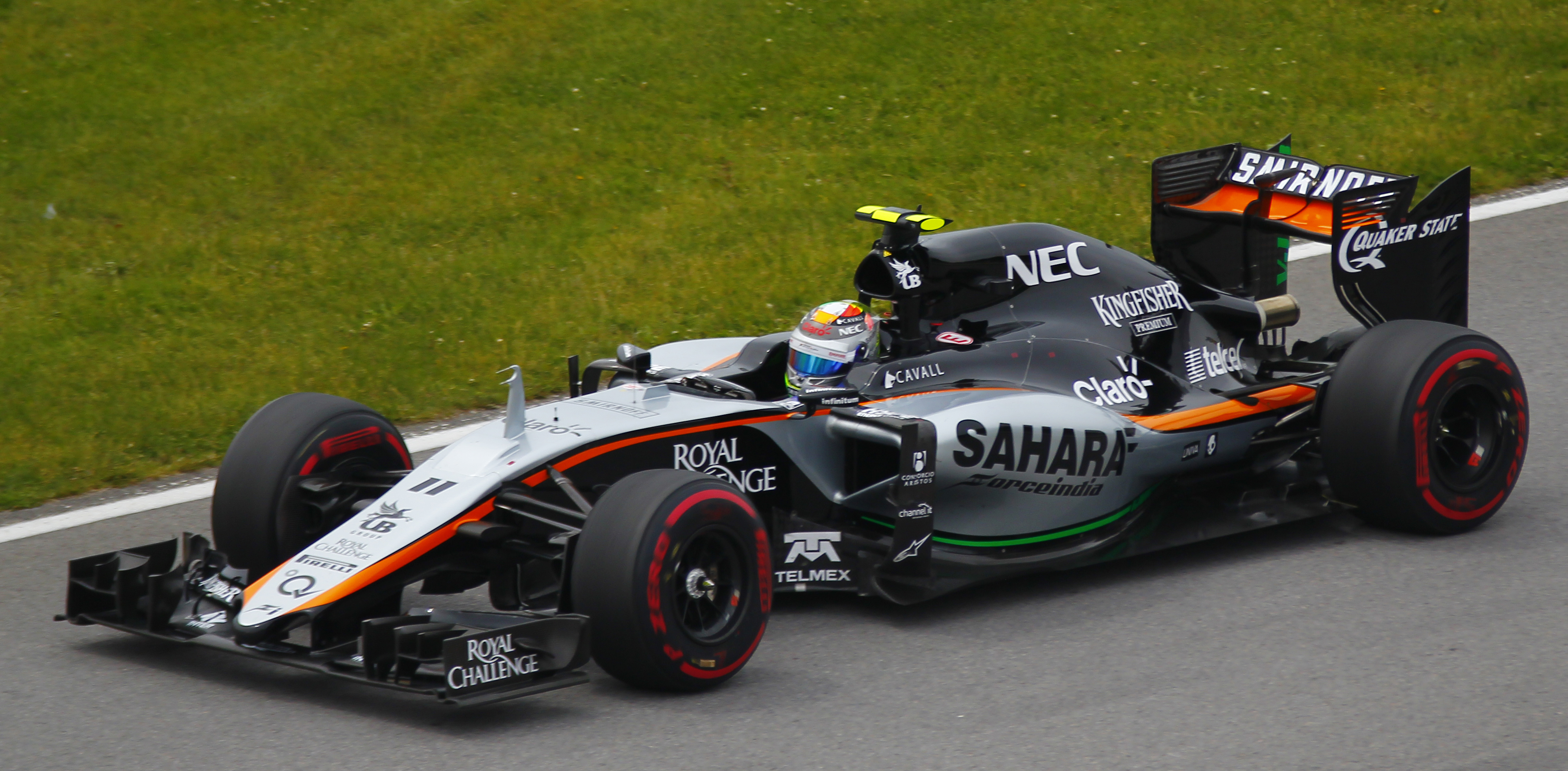
Pérez at the 2015 Canadian Grand Prix

The 2015 season started with a tenth place for Pérez in Australia, followed by a 13th in Malaysia, an 11th in China and an eighth in Bahrain. He came fifth in Belgium and sixth in Italy. His best race of the season was in Russia, where he scored his first podium of 2015 and Force India's third-ever. At the 2015 Hungarian Grand Prix during the first practice session he suffered a rear suspension failure and lost control of his car which led to a barrel roll that destroyed his car, he was able to walk away from the accident unscathed. He finished the 2015 championship in ninth, his highest championship position to date, with 78 points. He outscored teammate Hülkenberg by 20 points. Besides the podium finish in Russia, he managed three further top-five finishes in Belgium, the US, and Abu Dhabi; he scored 63 of his 78 points in the final nine rounds. In the second half of the season, he out-qualified his teammate in six of the last nine races and eight times throughout the season.

==== 2016 ====
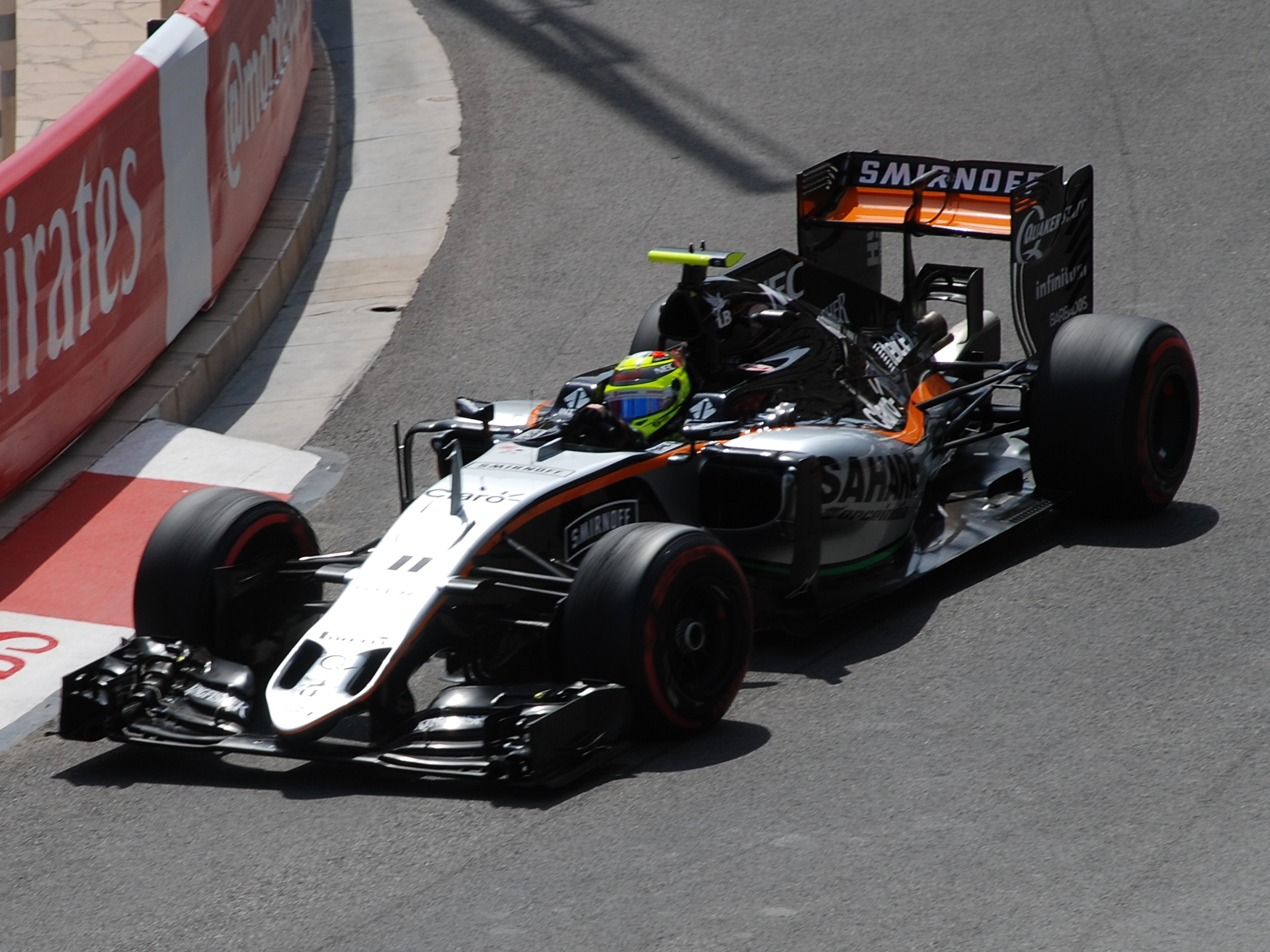
Pérez finished third in the 2016 Monaco Grand Prix.

Pérez experienced a difficult start to the season for the first four races due to an uncompetitive VJM09, but scored points with a ninth-place in Russia. Upgrades were introduced in Barcelona with a seventh-place finish indicating an improvement in the team's form.

In Monaco, Pérez scored his sixth (and Force India's fourth) podium finish in wet and changing conditions and moved to ninth in the Drivers' Championship standings. Tyre management played a significant role but in contrast to previous occasions he pitted as many times as Ferrari and Red Bull, at times catching up with the front runners and managing to hold Sebastian Vettel in fourth at a comfortable distance.

In the European Grand Prix in Baku, Pérez once again finished third, recovering from a gearbox change penalty as a result of a crash during free practice, having been fast enough to qualify on the front row. Despite having to start from seventh on the grid, he made his way up to fourth before passing Kimi Räikkönen on the last lap of the race for third, making it his second podium in three races.

==== 2017 ====
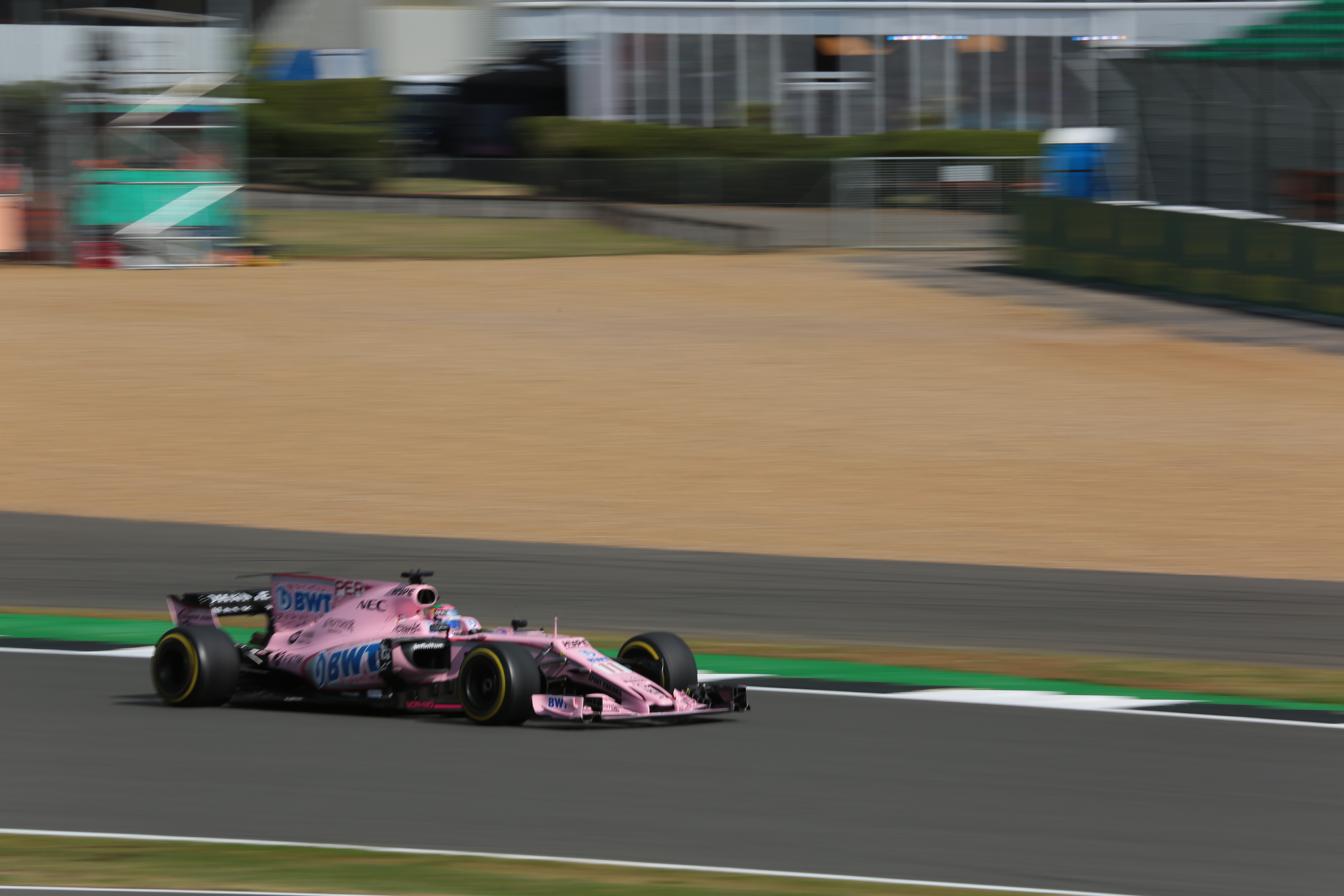
Pérez at the 2017 British Grand Prix

After the 2016 Malaysian Grand Prix, Pérez confirmed he had committed to Force India for the 2017 season. He remained with the Indian team for a fourth consecutive season alongside new teammate Esteban Ocon, ending speculation of a possible move to Williams, Renault or Haas. He was very consistent with his highest finish in 2017 a fourth place in Spain after two rivals collided at the start, and a third retired mid-race with a power unit failure. He ended his streak of 17 points finishes as he ended up colliding with Daniil Kvyat in Monaco. He had a moment with his teammate in Canada when he did not allow his teammate through, who thought he could challenge Daniel Ricciardo for third. He was again knocked out in Baku where he thought he could challenge for the win before colliding with Ocon. He finished seventh in Austria and moved up to sixth in the standings after Max Verstappen was out of the race on the first lap. He dropped to seventh in the championship after finishing ninth in Britain, behind his teammate and Verstappen finished fourth. He remained seventh in the standings for the rest of the season.

==== 2018 ====
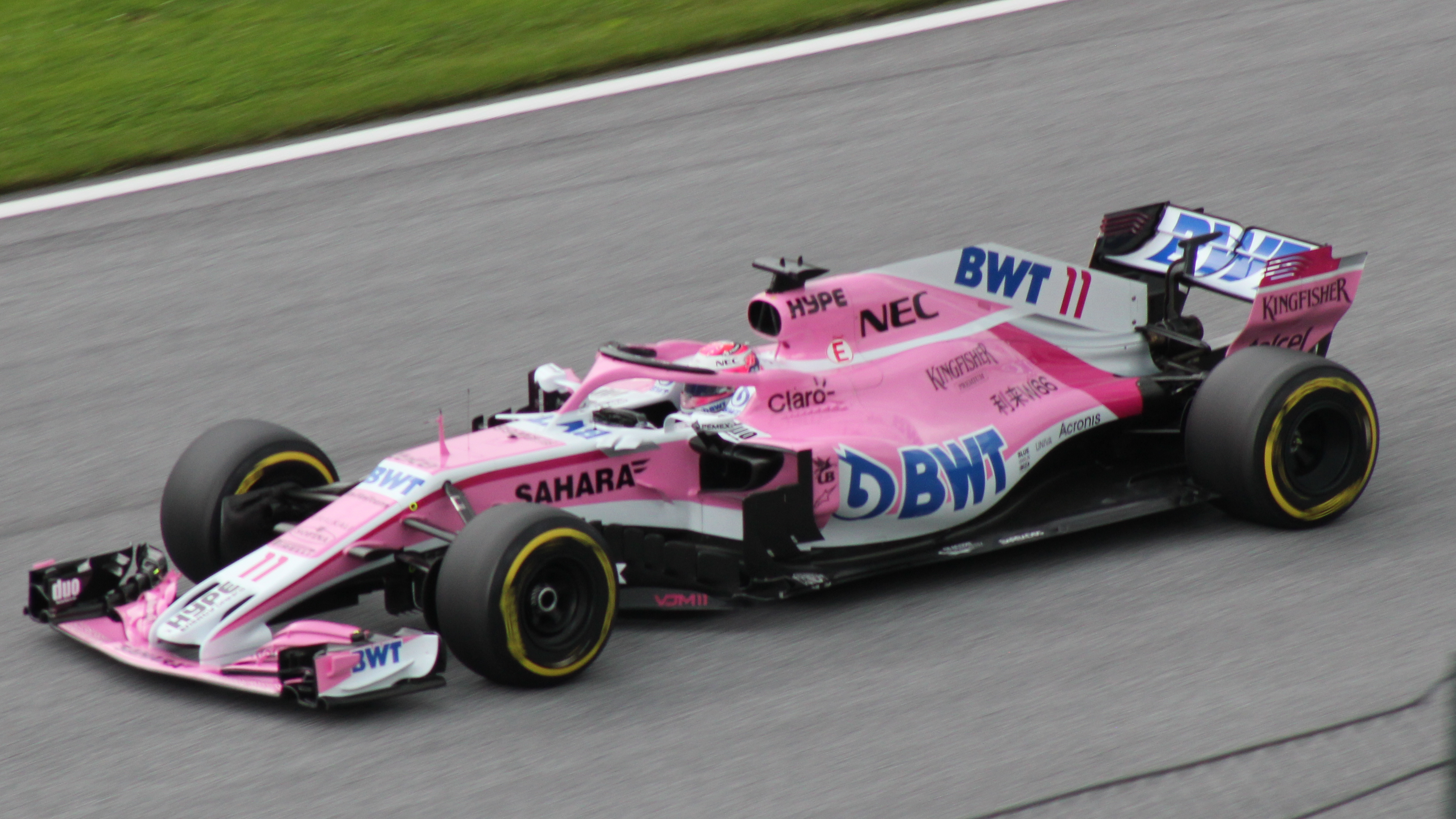
Pérez at the 2018 Austrian Grand Prix

Pérez finished the first three races of the season outside the points. He then achieved his eighth career podium finish at the Azerbaijan Grand Prix, finishing third after an incident-strewn race. He passed then-championship leader Sebastian Vettel for third place with a few laps to go, making him the first driver to finish on the podium twice at the Baku City Circuit (in 2016 and 2018). Another points finish came with ninth place in Spain. In France, he retired from the race with an engine failure. Three consecutive points finishes followed, with seventh-place finishes in Austria and Germany.

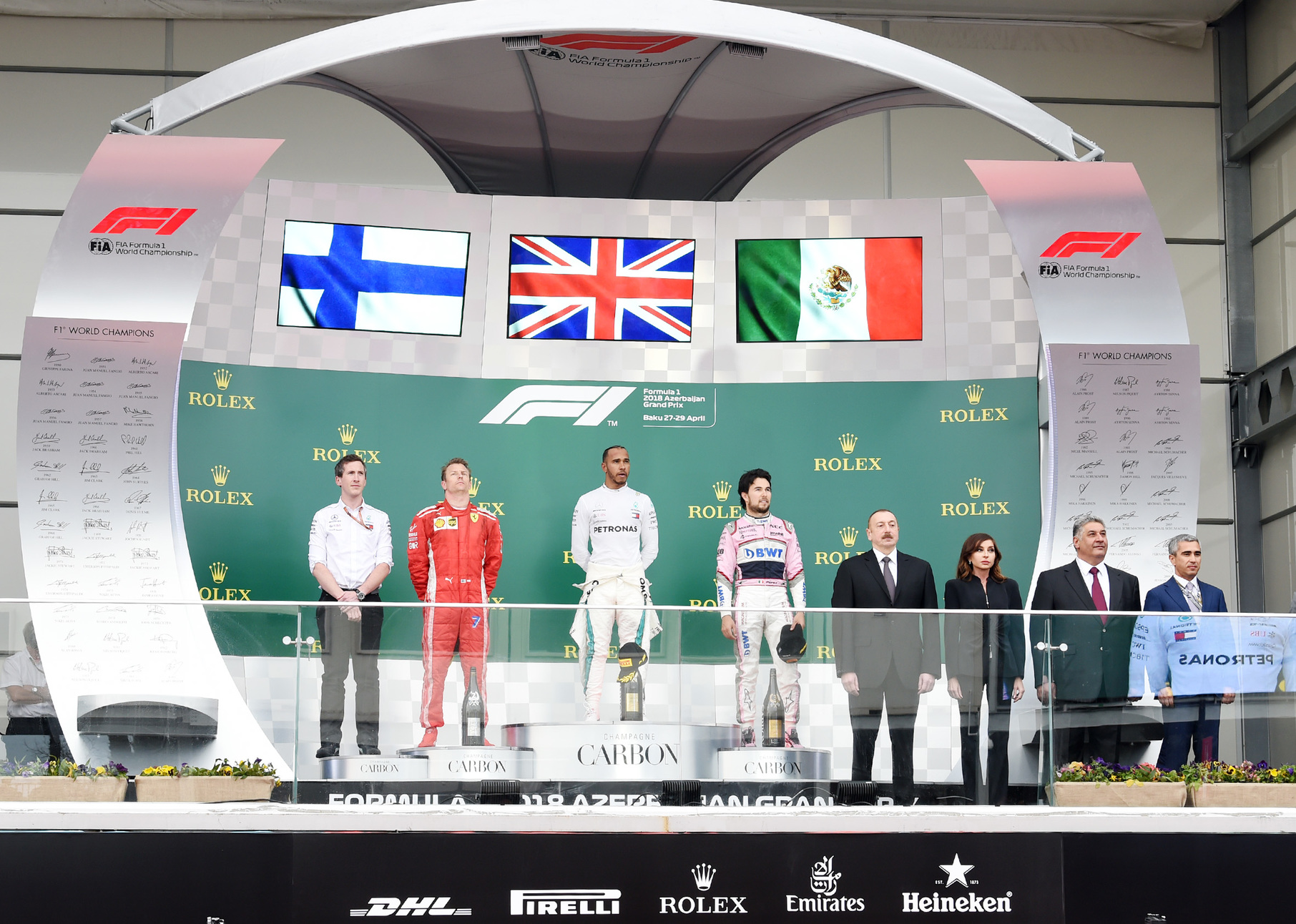
The podium ceremony at the 2018 Azerbaijan Grand Prix: Lewis Hamilton, Kimi Räikkönen and Pérez

After the Hungarian Grand Prix, Force India was put into administration. This was caused by a group of creditors (including Pérez) taking legal action against the team. Pérez said that this action was taken to save the team and its employees from a winding-up order instigated by other creditors, which would have resulted in the team's collapse. Shortly before the Belgian Grand Prix, Force India's assets were purchased by a consortium of investors led by Lawrence Stroll, father of Williams driver Lance Stroll. The team was re-admitted into the championship as a new team—Racing Point Force India—keeping Pérez and Ocon as their drivers. At the Belgian Grand Prix, the team came back strong with Pérez and Ocon qualifying fourth and third, and finishing fifth and sixth, respectively.

Pérez took seven points finishes from nine races in the second half of the season. However, he faced criticism after a poor performance in Singapore. He collided with his teammate Ocon on the opening lap, causing Ocon to crash into a wall and retire from the race. He also collided with Sergey Sirotkin, an action that resulted in a drive-through penalty. He later stated that he thought his penalty was "fair". He later suffered a brake failure and retired from his home race in Mexico. He ended the season in eighth place in the championship with 62 points, finishing ahead of teammate Ocon and being the only non-Mercedes, Ferrari or Red Bull driver to finish on the podium that season.

==== 2019 ====
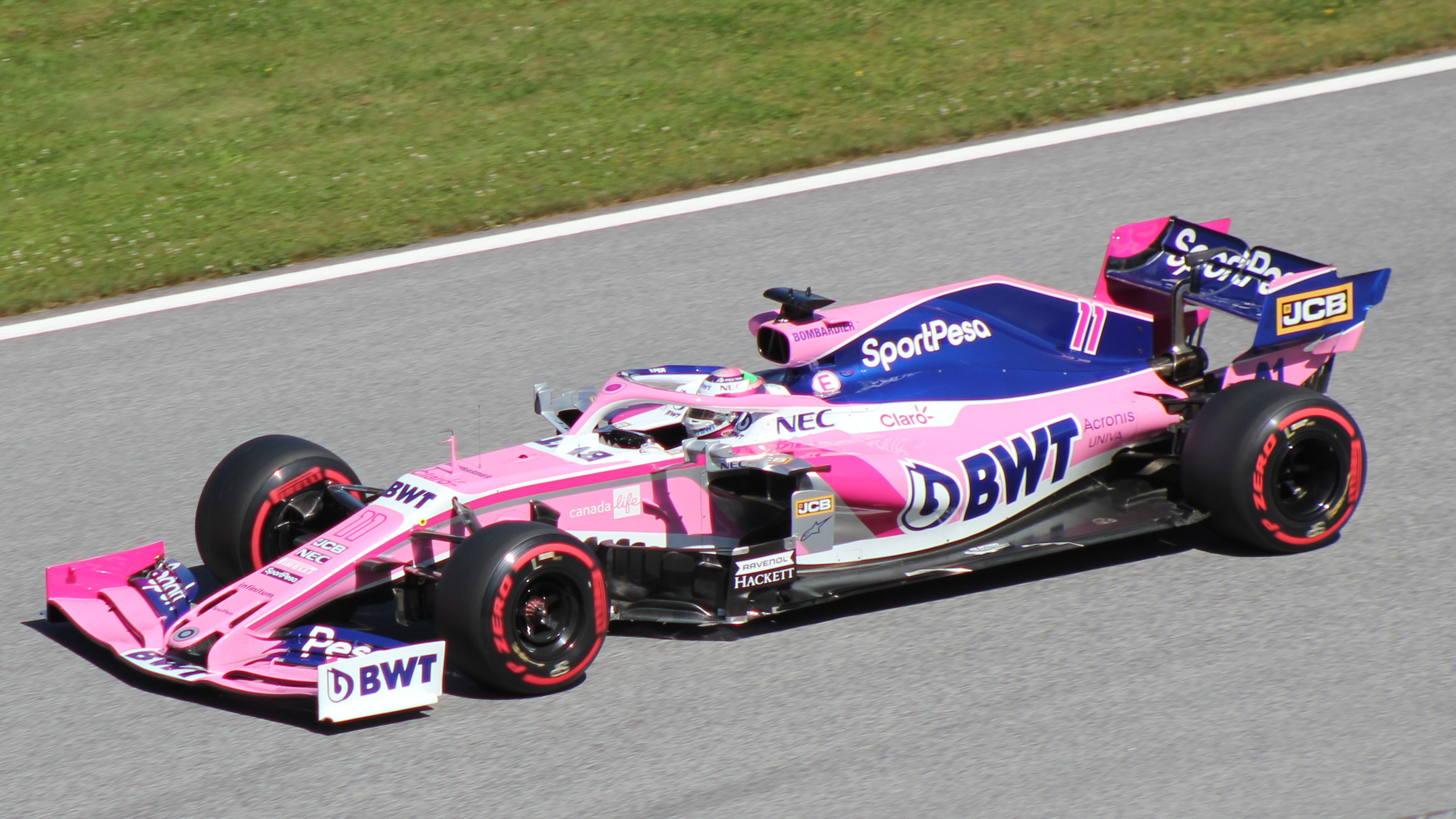
Pérez at the 2019 Austrian Grand Prix

The 2019 season saw Racing Point Force India become Racing Point, retaining Pérez as a driver. He was joined at the team by former Williams driver Lance Stroll. Racing Point saw 2019 as a transitional season, with much of the work on that year's car being disrupted by the administration events of the previous year. A strong start to the season, including a sixth-place finish in Azerbaijan, was followed by a string of eight races without points, the longest such string of his career. This included the rain-affected German Grand Prix, where he crashed out early in the race whilst teammate Stroll briefly led the race and eventually finished fourth.

In a similar manner to 2018, Pérez fared far better during the second half of the season. Except for a retirement in Singapore due to an oil leak, he scored points in every race after the summer break, including a strong 6th-place finish in Belgium. Many of these points finishes came from low initial grid positions, including a seventh-place finish in Italy after starting 18th, eighth in Japan from 17th, and tenth in the United States after starting from the pit lane.

Pérez finished the season in tenth place in the championship with 52 points, comfortably ahead of teammate Stroll.

==== 2020: Maiden victory ====
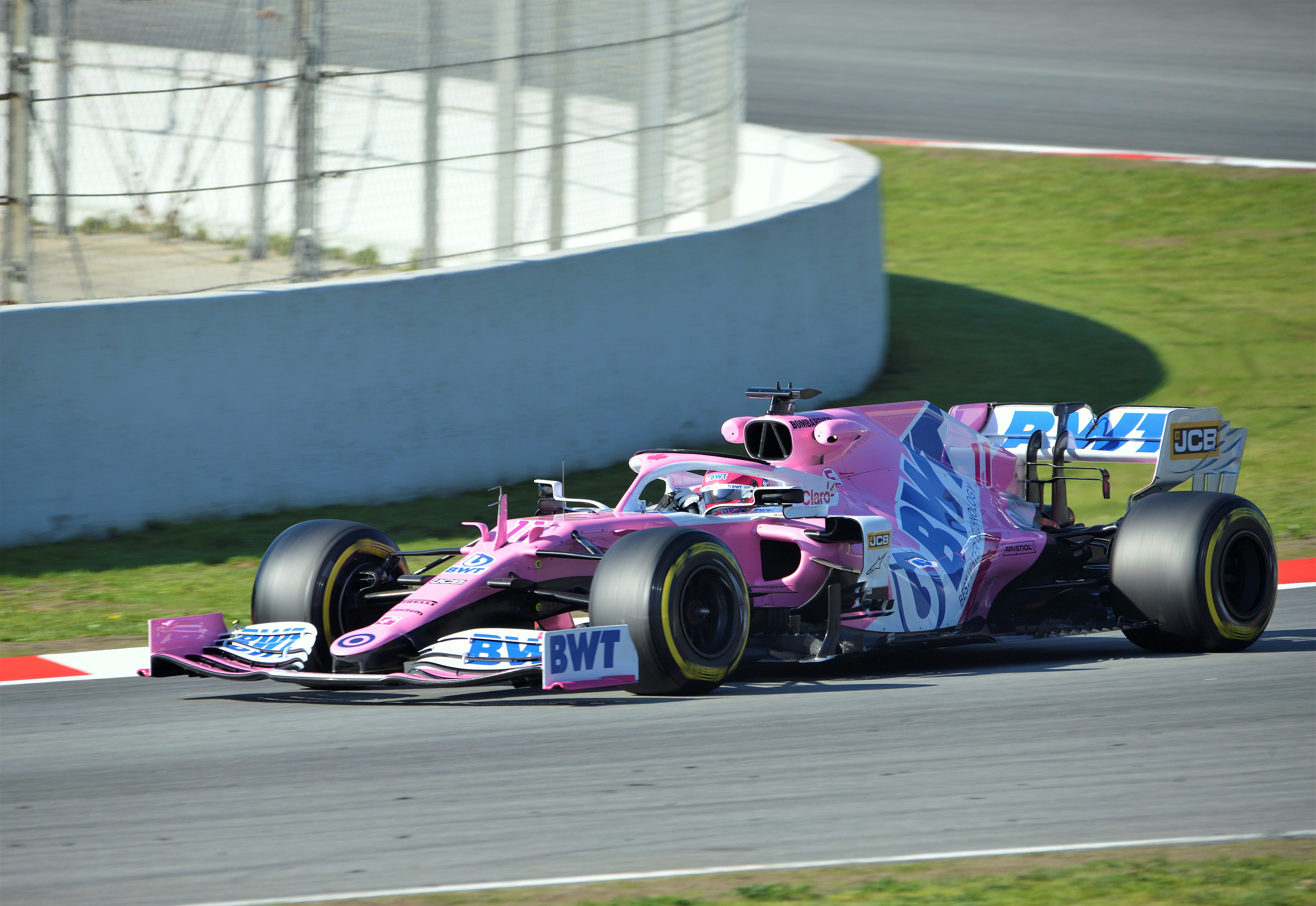
Perez driving in Barcelona in 2020 during pre-season testing

Pérez had signed a contract extension with Racing Point, for whom he was meant to continue racing until the end of 2022. Three days before the British Grand Prix, he tested positive for SARS-CoV-2 coronavirus which causes COVID-19. Due to this, he was unable to participate in the British Grand Prix. He was temporarily replaced by Nico Hülkenberg. It was confirmed that he would also miss the 70th Anniversary Grand Prix, as he had again tested positive for COVID-19. After testing negative for COVID-19 after the 70th Anniversary Grand Prix, Pérez returned to race at the Spanish Grand Prix, he qualified fourth and finished the race in fifth position. In September 2020, Pérez announced that he would be leaving Racing Point at the end of the 2020 season. He would be replaced by Sebastian Vettel as Racing Point become Aston Martin for the 2021 season.

Pérez achieved his ninth F1 podium at the Turkish Grand Prix. After qualifying third in the rain, Pérez passed Max Verstappen and went from third to second, only behind his teammate Lance Stroll, starting with full wet rain tyres and changing for intermediate tyres on lap 10 of 58. Pérez inherited the lead after Stroll made a pitstop, and on lap 37 he got overtaken by Lewis Hamilton for the lead. The podium was Hamilton, Pérez and Sebastian Vettel. Pérez was third for the majority of the Bahrain Grand Prix after starting fifth, but an MGU-K electrical issue struck with only a few laps to go, forcing him to pull over and retire the car with flames billowing out of the power unit.

Since Pérez announced his departure from Racing Point there was support from the media for him, with The Race saying it will be a "huge injustice were Perez not to be on the 2021 grid.". Former F1 driver and Sky Sports F1 commentator, Martin Brundle, also echoed similar thoughts in his online column review the 2020 Turkish Grand Prix where Pérez finished second and suggested that Pérez "should be on Red Bull Racing's radar" to partner Max Verstappen in place of Alex Albon.

Pérez won his first race at the Sakhir Grand Prix, becoming Formula 1's 110th race winner. On the first lap, Pérez was hit by Leclerc and went from 2nd place to 18th and last. On lap 64 he took the lead and won the race ahead of Esteban Ocon and teammate Stroll. This was the first win for a Mexican driver since Pedro Rodríguez won the 1970 Belgian Grand Prix 50 years prior.

Pérez finished the season with 125 points, scoring one win and one podium. He finished fourth overall which was his best ever championship result before joining Red Bull Racing, which he would later equal in 2021.

=== Red Bull (2021–2024) ===
==== 2021: First season at Red Bull ====
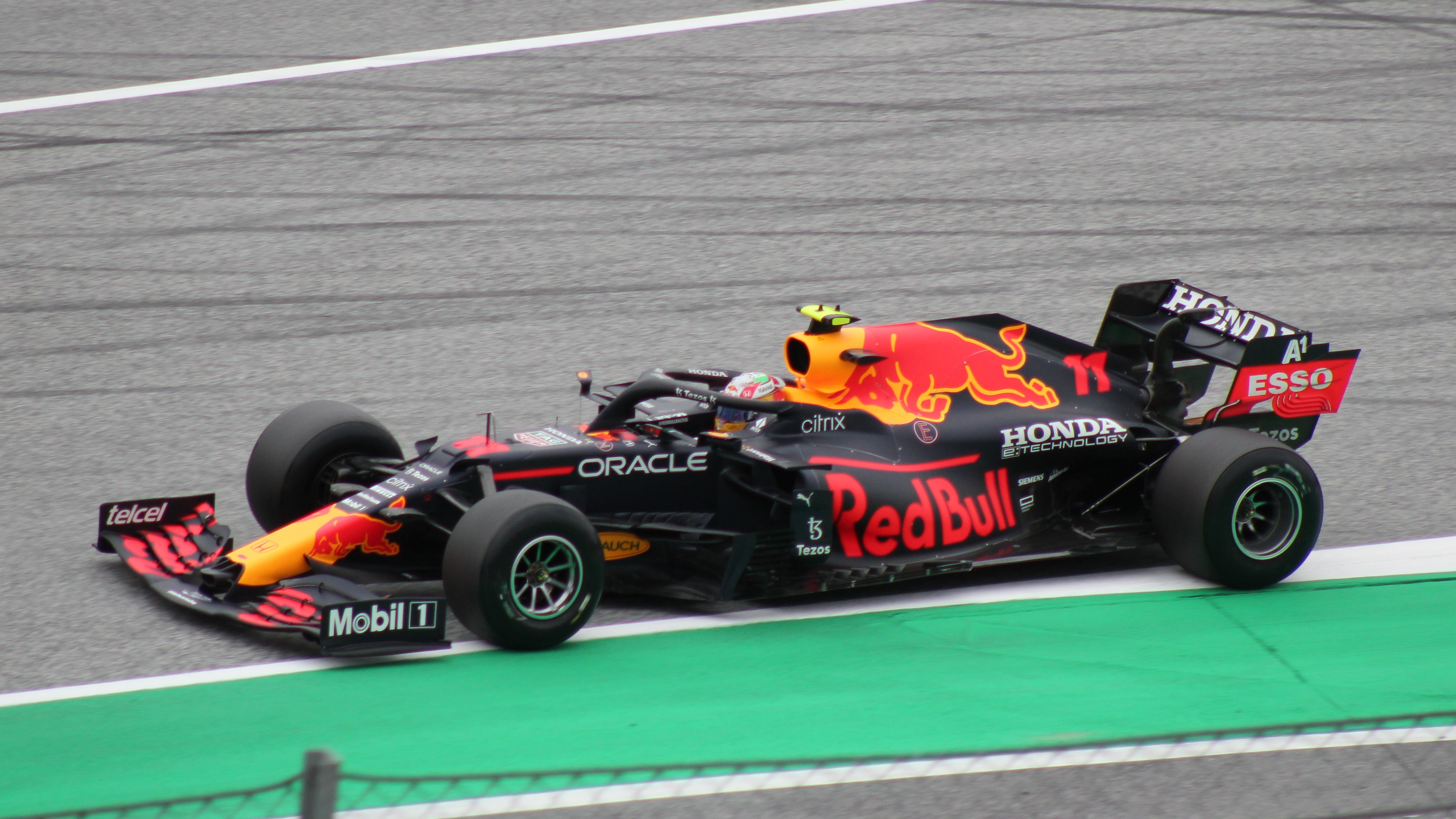
Pérez at the 2021 Austrian Grand Prix

Pérez raced for Red Bull Racing in 2021, replacing Alex Albon - who was demoted to the role of reserve and test driver - and partnering Max Verstappen.

At the 2021 Bahrain Grand Prix, Pérez made his debut with the Red Bull Racing team finishing in fifth place. During qualifying on Saturday he came 11th. During the formation lap for the race, his car switched off due to an electrical failure. He managed to reset his RB16B before having to start the race from the pitlane.

At the 2021 Emilia Romagna Grand Prix, Pérez qualified on the front row in second place, just 0.035 seconds behind polesitter Lewis Hamilton, outqualifying his teammate Max Verstappen in P3. It was his first time starting on the front row in his career.

At the 2021 Azerbaijan Grand Prix, Pérez qualified in seventh place, starting in sixth place due to a grid penalty for Lando Norris. In the race he made a strong start, moving up to third place by lap 8. In the pit stop window, he then passed Lewis Hamilton to take second place. Having stayed in this position for most of the race, Pérez moved into the lead following a tyre failure for teammate Max Verstappen and he hit the wall on lap 47. With the race restarting on lap 50, Lewis Hamilton locked up and went off the track into turn 1 after the restart, and he remained in the lead for the final two laps to take the second win of his career and his first for Red Bull.

At the 2021 French Grand Prix, Pérez qualified in fourth place, starting behind Mercedes driver Valtteri Bottas. In the race, he conserved his tyres up to lap 24. Due to his fresher tyres, he then passed Bottas to take third place on lap 49. It was the first time in his career that he scored podiums on consecutive weekends.

At the 2021 Styrian Grand Prix, Pérez qualified in fifth place, starting in fourth behind McLaren's Lando Norris after a penalty for Valtteri Bottas. He passed Norris early but lost a position to Bottas after a slow pitstop. Unable to pass the Mercedes, Pérez then switched strategies and pitted for fresh tyres and chased down Bottas in the final stages. He made up a 20-second deficit to catch Bottas on the final lap, but was unable to pass his rival for a third consecutive finish on the podium and finished just half a second behind in fourth place.

On the way to the grid at the 2021 Belgian Grand Prix, Pérez crashed, having skidded into the barriers at Les Combes. Pérez's car was fixed in time for the start of the race, although he was required to start from the back. Ultimately, however, the race was red-flagged after just two laps under the safety car, resulting in a result of 20th place, although he was later promoted to 19th due to a penalty given to Lance Stroll.

At the Turkish Grand Prix, Pérez finished third to score another podium finish, after an "intense" wheel to wheel battle with Lewis Hamilton in the wet.

At the United States Grand Prix, Pérez had one of his most competitive weekends of the season, out-qualifying the Mercedes of Valtteri Bottas and starting third behind teammate Verstappen and the other Mercedes of Lewis Hamilton, before finishing in the same position, albeit over 42 seconds behind eventual winner Verstappen, due to a drinks failure on the first lap.

In his home race in Mexico, Pérez took his third consecutive podium, for the first time in his career. In the closing stages of the race, he was able to pressure Lewis Hamilton for second place, but he was unable to pass Hamilton before the chequered flag.

At the season finale in Abu Dhabi, Pérez's defensive work against Hamilton helped his teammate Max Verstappen close a seven-second gap to Hamilton, which was crucial in Verstappen's title victory. Pérez retired from the race a few laps from the end because of suspected engine problems. Verstappen praised Pérez after the race stating "It's very rare to have a team mate like that ... he was a real team player and I really hope we can continue this for a long time."

Pérez finished the season with 190 points, scoring one win and five podiums. He finished fourth overall, equalling his best championship result set in 2020.

==== 2022: Maiden pole and third in the championship ====
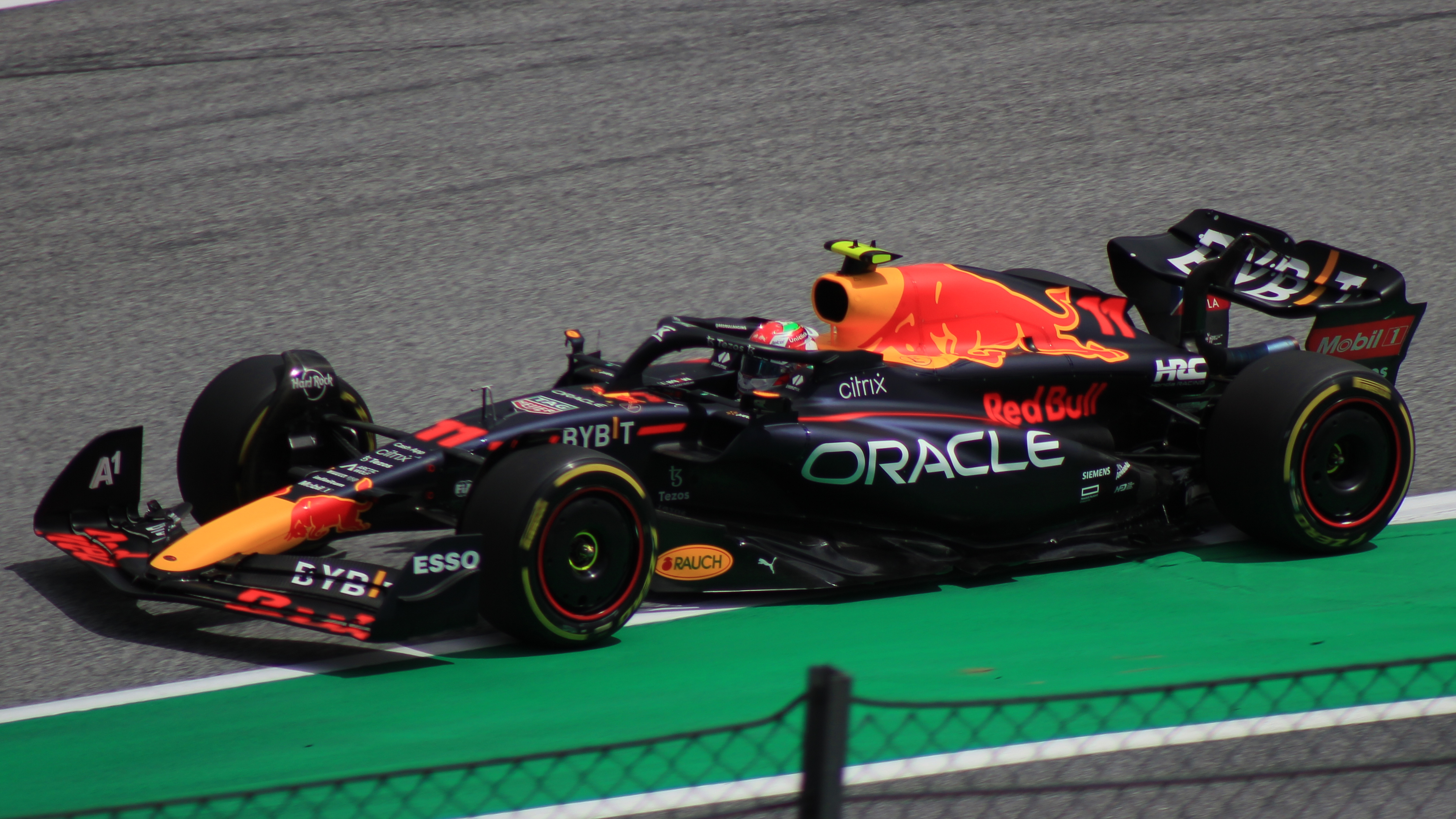
Pérez at the 2022 Austrian Grand Prix

Verstappen, Pérez, and Leclerc on the podium at the 2022 Japanese Grand Prix

Pérez stayed at Red Bull for the 2022 season. In May 2022, shortly after his win in Monaco, it was announced Pérez would stay with the team until the end of the 2024 season.

Pérez achieved his first pole position at the Saudi Arabian Grand Prix, on his 215th race start in Formula 1; therefore breaking the record for most races before a first pole position and also becoming the first Mexican driver to achieve a pole position in F1. He led the race until lap 16, where he pitted after coming under pressure from a potential undercut from Leclerc in second. A crash from Nicholas Latifi on the same lap meant that the safety car was brought out, allowing Leclerc, Verstappen and Sainz to make a pitstop and keep track position, demoting Perez to 4th place, where he would finish the race.

At the Australian Grand Prix, Pérez qualified third. He lost a position at the start to Lewis Hamilton because of getting boxed in and got the position back on lap 10. He made his pitstop on lap 21 for hard tyres. Pérez passed Fernando Alonso and George Russell. On lap 39 his teammate Max Verstappen retired from the race due to mechanical problems and Pérez was then running second behind Charles Leclerc, which he held until the finish. Pérez got the sixteenth podium of his career and his sixth with Red Bull Racing.

In the next round, the Emilia Romagna Grand Prix, Pérez qualified seventh as he was unable set a representative time in Q3 due to red flags. He recovered to third in the sprint race. He jumped up to second on the opening lap of the race, after beating Charles Leclerc off the line. Throughout most of the race, Pérez successfully prevented Leclerc from re-overtaking him. After Leclerc spun, Pérez subsequently coasted to second, behind teammate Max Verstappen. This gave Red Bull their first 1-2 finish since the 2016 Malaysian Grand Prix.

At the Spanish Grand Prix, Pérez qualified fifth, citing not driving the car in FP1, where he was replaced by Jüri Vips. He overtook Carlos Sainz Jr. at the start and later fought with George Russell for third place, which turned into a battle for second after teammate Max Verstappen went wide. Pérez was unable to overtake Russell so he let Verstappen through, who too was unable to overtake Russell due to an issue with his DRS. On Lap 31, after not being allowed to switch with Verstappen by the team, Pérez overtook Russell on the medium tyres when his teammate pitted and took the lead of the race, Charles Leclerc having retired earlier. Pérez again let Verstappen through on lap 49, the team citing Verstappen being on the three stop compared to Pérez's two. Pérez finished in second place, behind Verstappen, giving Red Bull another 1-2 result. Pérez was initially unsatisfied with the team orders despite being satisfied with the result, saying "I'm definitely here to win and I think if I was on the three-stop, I should have won the race."

At the Monaco Grand Prix, Pérez qualified third, crashing at the Portier corner on his final attempt. The race started in wet conditions with everyone on the full wet tyres. On Lap 17, Pérez pitted onto intermediate tyres from third place, later taking the lead on Lap 22 after Sainz pitted. Pérez pit the same lap for the slick hard tyres, and still emerged in the lead after a good out-lap. After a red flag, Pérez restarted the race on medium tyres. His tyres degraded quickly and both Ferrari cars and his teammate were right behind him, but unable to overtake. The race hit the three-hour limit, and Pérez held on to win the third race of his Formula One career, from Sainz and his teammate Verstappen.

Pérez qualified 2nd for the Azerbaijan Grand Prix, 2 tenths behind Charles Leclerc due to power loss and lack of a tow. In the race, he jumped Leclerc on the start and built a 2.5 second gap, which he maintained until his teammate Max Verstappen overtook him on Lap 14 after the order "no fighting" was issued to Pérez if Verstappen were to try to overtake him. Pérez was unable to keep up with Verstappen, attributing it to tyre degradation. He finished second to Verstappen, with Leclerc having retired. Pérez scored the 20th podium of his Formula One career.

At the British Grand Prix, Pérez started fourth. Due to a turn four crash, he was forced to pit for a new front wing which dropped him down to 17th. After a safety car, he recovered and was battling Lewis Hamilton and Charles Leclerc for second, where he ultimately finished. He also was voted the 'Driver of the day'.

At the Belgian Grand Prix, Pérez qualified third but was promoted to second due to his teammate's grid penalties. Team principal Christian Horner said it was tactical to not start on the pole due to the slipstream effect, which could help a driver take the lead going into the Les Combes corner. Pérez had a bad start and was attacked by the two Mercedes cars, but eventually moved back into second. After the pit stops played out, Pérez ultimately finished second behind his teammate Verstappen, giving Red Bull another 1-2 finish.

Pérez qualified second for the Singapore Grand Prix behind Charles Leclerc. He overtook Leclerc at the start and led every lap. The race was shortened to 59 laps because of the three hour time limit due to safety cars and an hour-long delay. He won with a 7.5 second advantage to Leclerc. Post-race, he was investigated for a safety car infringement; ultimately his win was allowed to stand, with him receiving a reprimand and a five-second penalty. He was voted Driver of the Day at the same Grand Prix.

At the Japanese Grand Prix, Pérez qualified fourth. In the race, Carlos Sainz Jr. retired after a crash, meaning Pérez ran third for most of the race. On the final lap, he pressured second placed Charles Leclerc into a mistake. Leclerc cut across the Casio Triangle, and blocked Pérez from making an overtake. Leclerc was awarded a five-second time penalty, which elevated Pérez to second in the race, giving Red Bull their fifth 1-2 result of the season. The penalty also meant his teammate Max Verstappen won the championship.

At his home race in Mexico, Pérez qualified fourth and overtook George Russell to once again finish on the podium in third place, behind Lewis Hamilton and teammate Verstappen.

During the next round in São Paulo, Pérez qualified ninth under tricky circumstances, elevating himself to fifth place during the Sprint race. In the race, he managed to run third for most of the time, but was caught out by a Safety Car with himself on Medium tyres compared to everyone else's Soft tyres. With an already slow car, Pérez dropped back to sixth place. He let teammate Verstappen past with the understanding that Verstappen would let Pérez back past if he could not gain any positions, due to Pérez' fight with Leclerc for second place in the drivers championship. Verstappen didn't let Pérez back past, which left Pérez disappointed. Post race Pérez said the matter was "discussed internally" and they are going to put it "behind" themselves.

At the final round in Abu Dhabi, Pérez and Leclerc were tied on 290 points for second place. In qualifying, Pérez received a tow from his teammate on his final flying lap and qualified second, ahead of Leclerc. During the race, Pérez switched to a two stop pitstop strategy, pitting opposite of Leclerc. He lost time fighting Sebastian Vettel and Fernando Alonso, as he went wide at the chicane while attempting an overtake. He later made the same mistake while overtaking Lewis Hamilton, again losing time. Finally, he was held up by Pierre Gasly who was getting lapped, but was engaged in a battle of his own didn't quickly concede the position. Eventually Pérez finished 1.4 seconds behind Leclerc in third place which meant he ended up third in the 2022 Drivers Standings.

Pérez finished the season with 305 points, with two wins, one pole position, 11 podiums and three fastest laps, his best season in Formula 1 yet.

==== 2023: Championship runner-up ====
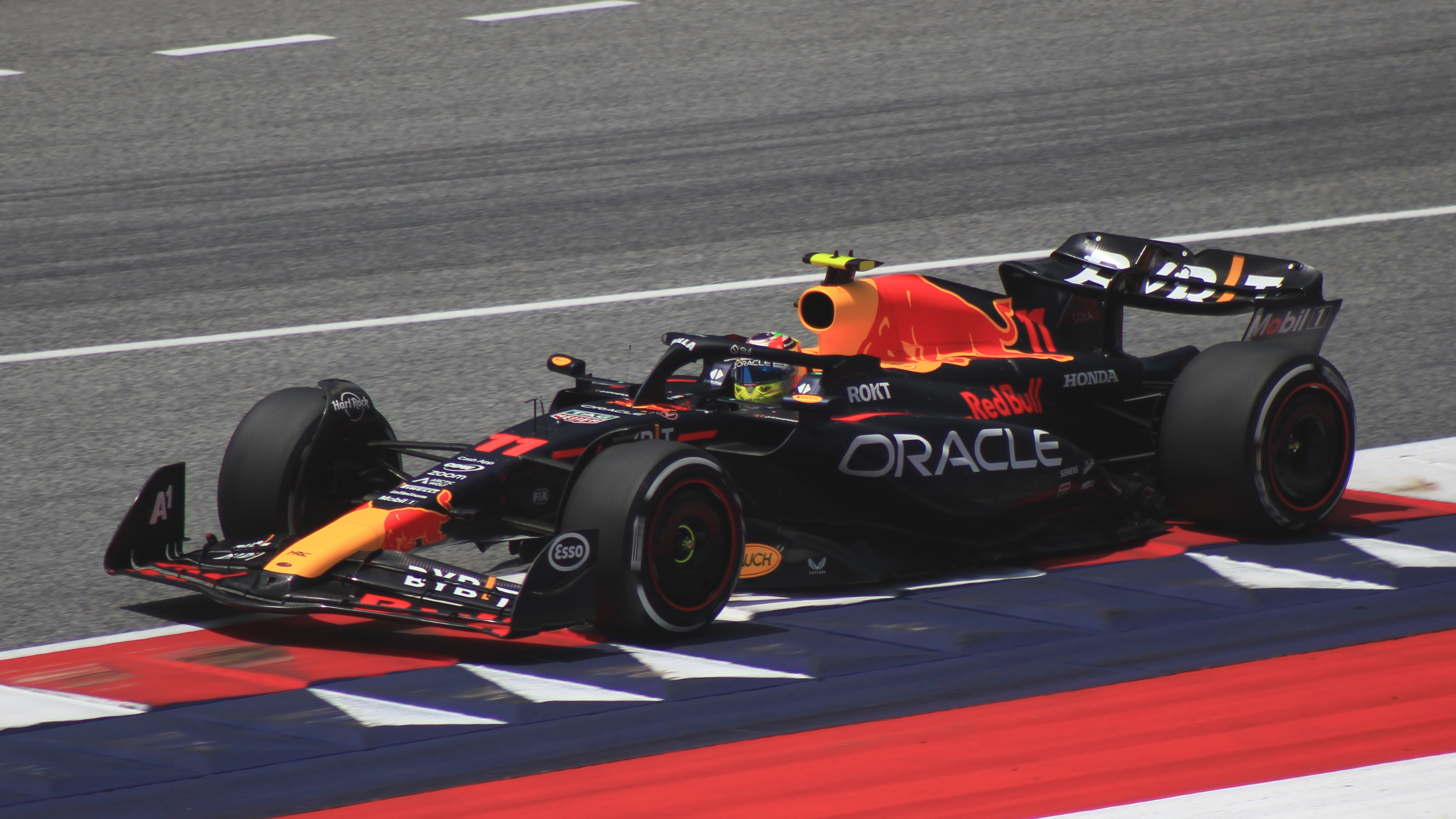
Pérez at the 2023 Austrian Grand Prix

At the season opener in Bahrain, Pérez was even with teammate Verstappen in their last qualifying laps until the final corners, where oversteer moments cost him pole by nearly 0.15 seconds. In the race, he initially lost position to Charles Leclerc, which he later recovered. He then finished second, about 11 seconds behind Verstappen.

At the Saudi Arabian Grand Prix, Verstappen had a technical issue that saw him knocked out in Q2. Pérez then went on to take his second career pole position. He lost position to Fernando Alonso at the start, which he quickly regained. Teammate Verstappen climbed up to second place from 15th, but Pérez' slightly faster pace meant he won the race by nearly five seconds, his fifth career victory and first one in the 2023 season.

At the Azerbaijan Grand Prix, Pérez managed to qualify second for the sprint race on Saturday and third for the Sunday race. Winning both the sprint race and Grand Prix, he closed the gap between himself in second place and Max Verstappen in first place in the Drivers' Championship to six points. His sixth overall career victory, it also makes Pérez the first and, to date, only driver to win the Azerbaijan Grand Prix more than once, having also done so in 2021.

At the Miami Grand Prix, Pérez qualified in pole position after an error from Ferrari's Charles Leclerc caused a red flag late in the session. This brought the session to a close and Pérez's teammate Max Verstappen was unable to set a time after aborting his first lap in Q3. In the race, Pérez was overtaken by Verstappen when he pitted on lap 21. He briefly regained the lead on lap 46 when Verstappen pitted for mediums but eventually conceded the lead to his teammate who would go on to win the race.

After a string of bad luck and errors saw Pérez neither make Q3 for the next five races nor the podium for the next three, Pérez qualified second behind Verstappen for the sprint race in Austria. He tussled with Verstappen for the lead but eventually finished second. In the race, he finished in third place from his grid position of fifteenth.

In Hungary, Pérez finished third after qualifying in ninth and also got Driver of the Day.

Pérez qualified third in Belgium, a few tenths behind Charles Leclerc but started second due to teammate Verstappen's gearbox penalty. He qualified eighth for the Sprint Shootout after not getting to complete a final lap, and due to damage after contact with Hamilton could not finish the sprint. In the race, he overtook Leclerc on the first lap. He later lost the lead to Verstappen and finished second.

After narrowly missing out on the podium in the Netherlands, in Italy, Pérez qualified fifth despite an engine issue in FP3. He started behind both Ferraris, Verstappen and Russell. In the race, he started on medium tyres, overtook Russell, and later pitted for hard tyres. He narrowly missed out on undercutting both Ferraris but overtook them anyway, finishing second.

After finishing 8th in Singapore and retiring in Japan two times in one race which allowed Lewis Hamilton to close up to him in the fight for second in the championship, Pérez entered Qatar needing to outscore teammate Verstappen by 32 points to keep his title hopes alive but he qualified 13th for the main race and eighth for the sprint. In the sprint he was making progress when he got collected by Esteban Ocon after the Alpine driver collided with Nico Hülkenberg and spun into Pérez. The damage ended his race which knocked him out of title contention confirming Verstappen as the 2023 World Champion. He finished tenth in the main race after multiple penalties. In the United States Grand Prix, he finished in 4th place. In the next race, the Mexico City Grand Prix, he collided with Leclerc while trying to overtake him around the outside, forcing him to retire from his home race on the first lap. Despite this, he finished fourth in Brazil and 3rd in Las Vegas, securing second place in the Drivers' Championship and giving Red Bull Racing their first ever 1-2 in the Championship. Pérez finished the season with 285 points, with two wins, two pole positions, nine podiums and two fastest laps.

==== 2024: Winless season and departure ====
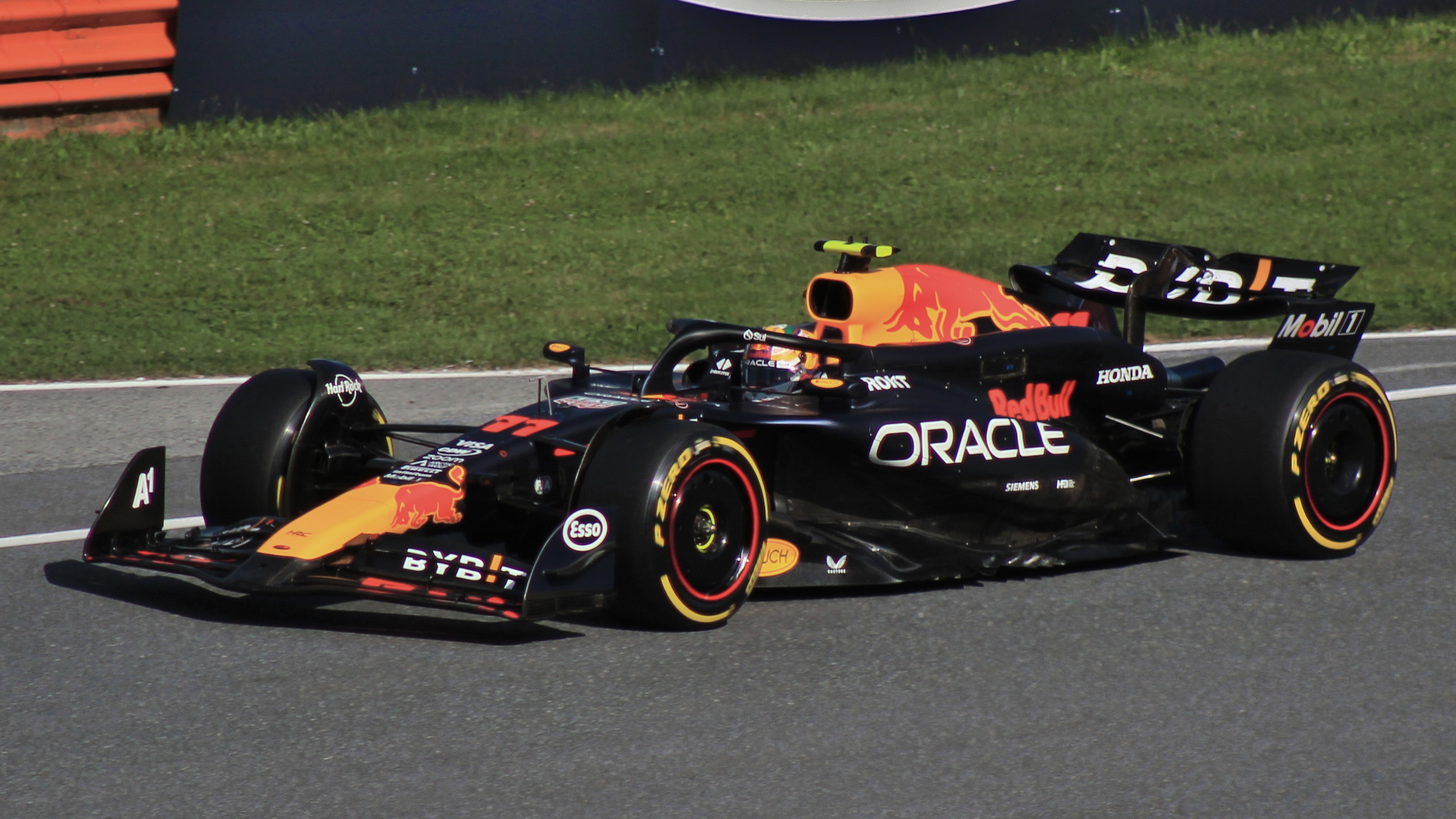
Pérez at the 2024 Austrian Grand Prix

Pérez started the 2024 season with back-to-back second-place finishes in the Bahrain and Saudi Arabian Grand Prix, before picking up two more podiums in Japan and China. He was involved in a multicar collision on the first lap at the Monaco Grand Prix. Ahead of the Canadian Grand Prix, Pérez announced that he would extend his stay with Red Bull Racing until at least the end of the 2026 season. During the race itself, he crashed out on his own, breaking his rear wing and retiring. He fought the Haas of Nico Hülkenberg at the Austrian Grand Prix, spun out of qualifying for the British Grand Prix and ended up being lapped while his teammate finished on the podium, crashed in qualifying for the Hungarian Grand Prix and only just recovered to the points, and started on the front row behind Charles Leclerc at the Belgian Grand Prix but dropped positions, finishing behind his teammate, who had taken an engine penalty.

At the Azerbaijan Grand Prix, Pérez outqualified Verstappen for the first time since the 2023 Miami Grand Prix, starting fourth for the race while his team-mate started 6th on the grid. On the first lap of the race, Pérez overtook the Ferrari of Carlos Sainz to move up to third, where he stayed for the majority of the race. As polesitter Charles Leclerc's tyres began to degrade, Pérez and Sainz found themselves in contention for second place, both attempting to overtake the Monegasque driver. However, on the penultimate lap, contact on the back straight sent both cars into the barrier, ending their races. The crash was deemed to be a racing incident by the stewards, but it was a bitter end to a weekend where Pérez had dominated his teammate in almost every session.

For a majority of the season, Pérez was consistently outperformed by teammate Max Verstappen, and as the RB20 dropped in form with McLaren and Ferrari achieving race wins and podiums, Red Bull began to put pressure on him. Pérez endured a terrible home race: starting in eighteenth, behind Oscar Piastri, he then received a five-second penalty for an improper start and was unable to make any moves during the race; meanwhile, his teammate came back from a twenty-second penalty to finish in sixth. He ended up fighting RB rookie Liam Lawson for position amongst others instead, leading to remonstrations from Red Bull higher-ups. Pérez finished in seventeenth, which was last of the finishing cars following the retirement of three other cars. He finished eleventh in the rain-affected São Paulo Grand Prix after spinning on the first lap. At the Las Vegas Grand Prix, he qualified sixteenth and finished tenth. During the penultimate round—the Qatar Grand Prix—Pérez spun out under safety car conditions, reporting a loss of power. Pérez retired from the season-ending Abu Dhabi Grand Prix after a first-lap collision with Valtteri Bottas. He finished the season eighth in the standings on 152 championship points, 285 behind teammate Verstappen, who won the World Drivers' Championship. Following the season, Pérez and Red Bull mutually agreed to terminate his extended contract, ending a four-year partnership; he was replaced by Liam Lawson.

=== Cadillac (2026–) ===
==== 2026: Return to the grid ====
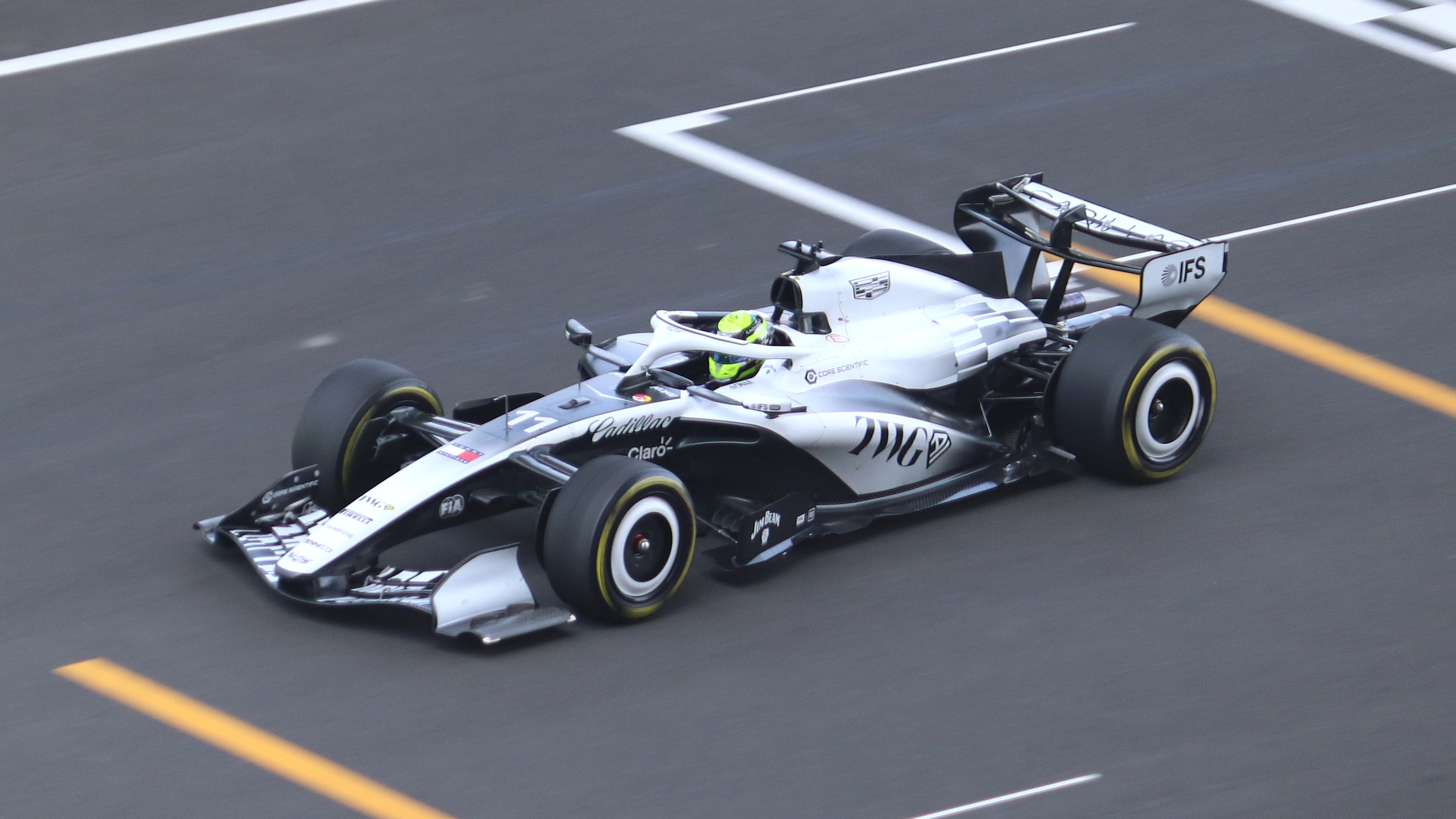
Pérez at the 2026 Chinese Grand Prix

In August 2025, Cadillac announced that Pérez had signed for their debut 2026 campaign alongside two-time World Drivers' Championship runner-up Valtteri Bottas; Pérez described the role as "a huge responsibility, one [he was] confident of taking on", adding his desire to shape Cadillac into "the team of the Americas". In an interview, Pérez said that his sabbatical year allowed him to fall back in love with F1 after a hard exit from Red Bull, and that Pérez returned feeling refreshed and energised. Pérez has been heavily involved in the team's development, contributing in simulator work and engineering meetings Cadillac builds from the ground up. Pérez stated that he sees this as his "final big project" in the sport, highlighting that he has "nothing to prove" and that his priority is to enjoy racing again rather than looking for validation. Pérez said on Cadillac's progress, that they can "surprise a lot of people" from the very beginning. In partnership with Ferrari, he tested the SF-23 alongside Cadillac at Imola.

==== 2027 ====
In October 2026, Pérez signed a contract extension to remain with the team until the end of the 2029 season.

== Other ventures ==
=== Powerboat racing ===
Pérez is the owner of the eponymous powerboat racing outfit Sergio Pérez E1 Team, which competed in the 2024 E1 Series Championship.

=== Philanthropy ===
In November 2012, Pérez unveiled the Checo Pérez Foundation to support orphans and children with cancer. His sister Paola is the foundation's president.

== Karting record ==
=== Karting career summary ===
Season	Series	Team	Position
2002	Super Karts Cup México — Superkart 125 (Light) JAP	Wap Racing	19th
2002	Super Karts Cup México — Superkart 80 (Light)	Wap Racing	10th
2003	Super Karts Cup México — Superkart 125 (Light)	WAP	31st
2003	Easykart Mexico — 100 cc		4th
2010	Van der Drift Fundraiser	Oxfordshires	2nd
2016	SKUSA SuperNationals — KZ2	GP VCI Mexico	28th

== Racing record ==
=== Racing career summary ===
Season	Series	Team	Races	Wins	Poles	F/Laps	Podiums	Points	Position
2004	Skip Barber National Championship	Telmex Racing	14	0	0	–	1	77	11th
2005	Formula BMW ADAC	4speed Media	19	0	0	0	1	37	14th
2006	Formula BMW ADAC	ADAC Berlin-Brandenburg	18	0	0	0	2	112	6th
2006–07	A1 Grand Prix	A1 Team Mexico	2	0	0	0	0	35†	10th†
2007	British Formula 3 International Series - National	T-Sport	21	14	14	0	19	376	**1st**
2008	British Formula 3 International Series	T-Sport	22	4	0	1	7	195	4th
2008–09	GP2 Asia Series	Campos Grand Prix	11	2	0	1	3	26	7th
2009	GP2 Series	Arden International	20	0	0	1	2	22	12th
2009–10	GP2 Asia Series	Barwa Addax Team	4	0	0	0	0	5	15th
2010	GP2 Series	Barwa Addax Team	20	5	1	5	7	71	**2nd**
2011	Formula One	Sauber F1 Team	19	0	0	0	0	14	16th
2012	Formula One	Sauber F1 Team	20	0	0	1	3	66	10th
2013	Formula One	Vodafone McLaren Mercedes	19	0	0	1	0	49	11th
2014	Formula One	Sahara Force India F1 Team	19	0	0	1	1	59	10th
2015	Formula One	Sahara Force India F1 Team	19	0	0	0	1	78	9th
2016	Formula One	Sahara Force India F1 Team	21	0	0	0	2	101	7th
2017	Formula One	Sahara Force India F1 Team	20	0	0	1	0	100	7th
2018	Formula One	Sahara Force India F1 Team	12	0	0	0	1	62	8th
2018	Formula One	Racing Point Force India F1 Team	9	0	0	0	0	62	8th
2019	Formula One	SportPesa Racing Point F1 Team	21	0	0	0	0	52	10th
2020	Formula One	BWT Racing Point F1 Team	16	1	0	0	2	125	4th
2021	Formula One	Red Bull Racing Honda	22	1	0	2	5	190	4th
2022	Formula One	Oracle Red Bull Racing	22	2	1	3	11	305	3rd
2023	Formula One	Oracle Red Bull Racing	22	2	2	2	9	285	2nd
2024	Formula One	Oracle Red Bull Racing	24	0	0	1	4	152	8th
2026	Formula One	Cadillac F1 Team	21	0	0	0	0	0*	24th*

^{†} Includes points scored by other drivers.
* Season still in progress.

=== Complete Skip Barber National Championship results ===
(key) (Races in bold indicate pole position; races in italics indicate fastest lap)

Year	Entrant	1	2	3	4	5	6	7	8	9	10	11	12	13	14	DC	Points
2004	Telmex Racing	SEB; 1; 13	SEB; 2; 17	VIR; 1; 7	VIR; 2; 17	ROA; 1; 20	ROA; 2; 8	HAL; 1; 8	HAL; 2; 11	MOS; 1; 10	MOS; 2; 6	MTT; 1; 9	MTT; 2; 9	ROA; 1; 3	ROA; 2; 16	11th	77

=== Complete Formula BMW ADAC results ===
(key) (Races in bold indicate pole position; races in italics indicate fastest lap)

Year	Entrant	1	2	3	4	5	6	7	8	9	10	11	12	13	14	15	16	17	18	19	20	DC	Points
2005	4speed Media	HOC1; 1; 13	HOC1; 2; 2	LAU; 1; 6	LAU; 2 Ret	SPA; 1; 5	SPA; 2 DNS	NÜR1; 1; 15	NÜR1; 2; 8	BRN; 1; 12	BRN; 2; 8	OSC; 1 Ret	OSC; 2; 14	NOR; 1; 13	NOR; 2; 13	NÜR2; 1 Ret	NÜR2; 2; 9	ZAN; 1; 14	ZAN; 2; 15	HOC2; 1; 12	HOC2; 2 Ret	14th	37
2006	ADAC Berlin-Brandenburg	HOC1; 1; 5	HOC1; 2; 4	LAU; 1 Ret	LAU; 2; 6	NÜR1; 1; 5	NÜR1; 2; 6	OSC1; 1; 3	OSC1; 2; 6	OSC2; 1; 7	OSC2; 2; 5	NOR; 1; 5	NOR; 2 DSQ	NÜR2; 1; 9	NÜR2; 2 Ret	ZAN; 1; 5	ZAN; 2; 3	HOC2; 1; 6	HOC2; 2; 5			6th	112

=== Complete A1 Grand Prix results ===
(key) (Races in bold indicate pole position; races in italics indicate fastest lap)

Year	Entrant	1	2	3	4	5	6	7	8	9	10	11	12	13	14	15	16	17	18	19	20	21	22	DC	Points
2006–07	Mexico	NED; SPR	NED; FEA	CZE; SPR	CZE; FEA	CHN; SPR	CHN; FEA	MYS; SPR	MYS; FEA	IDN; SPR	IDN; FEA	NZL; SPR; PO	NZL; FEA; PO	AUS; SPR; PO	AUS; FEA; PO	RSA; SPR	RSA; FEA	MEX; SPR; PO	MEX; FEA; PO	CHN; SPR; 15	CHN; FEA; Ret	GBR; SPR	GBR; SPR	10th	35

=== Complete British Formula Three Championship results ===
(key) (Races in bold indicate pole position; races in italics indicate fastest lap)

Year	Entrant	Chassis	Engine	Class	1	2	3	4	5	6	7	8	9	10	11	12	13	14	15	16	17	18	19	20	21	22	DC	Points	Ref
2007	T-Sport	Dallara F304	Mugen-Honda	N	**OUL**; **1** Ret	OUL; 2 DNS	DON; 1; 15	**DON**; **2**; 10	BUC; 1; 13	**BUC**; **2**; 11	**SNE**; **1**; 13	SNE; 2; 20	**MNZ**; **1**; 10	**MNZ**; **2**; 7	BRH; 1; 13	BRH; 2; 16	**SPA**; **1**; 9	**SPA**; **2**; 15	**SIL**; **1**; 11	**SIL**; **2**; 12	THR; 1; 10	**THR**; **2**; 13	CRO; 1; 11	**CRO**; **2**; 13	**ROC**; **1**; 14	ROC; 2; 13	1st	376	
2008	T-Sport	Dallara F308	Mugen-Honda	C	OUL; 1; 7	OUL; 2; 13	CRO; 1; 1	CRO; 2; 2	MNZ; 1; 1	MNZ; 2; 1	ROC; 1; 5	ROC; 2; 13	SNE; 1 Ret	SNE; 2; 4	THR; 1; 7	THR; 2; 4	BRH; 1; 4	BRH; 2; 1	SPA; 1; 6	SPA; 2; 2	SIL; 1; 4	SIL; 2; 4	BUC; 1 Ret	BUC; 2 Ret	DON; 1 Ret	DON; 2; 3	4th	195	

=== Complete GP2 Asia Series results ===
(key) (Races in bold indicate pole position; races in italics indicate fastest lap)

Year	Entrant	1	2	3	4	5	6	7	8	9	10	11	12	DC	Points
2008–09	Campos Grand Prix	SHI; FEA; Ret	SHI; SPR; 7	DUB; FEA; 6	DUB; SPR; C	BHR1; FEA; 8	BHR1; SPR; 1	LSL; FEA; 2	LSL; SPR; 1	SEP; FEA; Ret	SEP; SPR; 6	BHR2; FEA; 12	BHR2; SPR; 9	7th	26
2009–10	Barwa Addax Team	YMC1; FEA	YMC1; SPR	YMC2; FEA; 12	YMC2; SPR; 4	BHR1; FEA; 7	BHR1; SPR; 17	BHR2; FEA	BHR2; SPR					15th	5

=== Complete GP2 Series results ===
(key) (Races in bold indicate pole position; races in italics indicate fastest lap)

Year	Entrant	1	2	3	4	5	6	7	8	9	10	11	12	13	14	15	16	17	18	19	20	DC	Points
2009	Arden International	CAT; FEA; 14	CAT; SPR; 17	MON; FEA; 12	MON; SPR; 9	IST; FEA; Ret	IST; SPR; 16	SIL; FEA; 4	SIL; SPR; 6	NÜR; FEA; 8	NÜR; SPR; 20	HUN; FEA; Ret	HUN; SPR; 16	VAL; FEA; 3	VAL; SPR; 2	SPA; FEA; Ret	SPA; SPR; 4	MNZ; FEA; Ret	MNZ; SPR; Ret	ALG; FEA; Ret	ALG; SPR; 11	12th	22
2010	Barwa Addax Team	CAT; FEA; 4	CAT; SPR; Ret	MON; FEA; 1	MON; SPR; 6	IST; FEA; DSQ	IST; SPR; 7	**VAL**; **FEA**; 11	VAL; SPR; 16	SIL; FEA; 5	SIL; SPR; 1	HOC; FEA; 2	HOC; SPR; 1	HUN; FEA; 3	HUN; SPR; Ret	SPA; FEA; 7	SPA; SPR; 1	MNZ; FEA; Ret	MNZ; SPR; 13	YMC; FEA; 1	YMC; SPR; Ret	**2nd**	**71**

=== Complete Formula One results ===
(key) (Races in bold indicate pole position; races in italics indicate fastest lap)

Year	Entrant	Chassis	Engine	1	2	3	4	5	6	7	8	9	10	11	12	13	14	15	16	17	18	19	20	21	22	23	24	WDC	Points
2011	Sauber F1 Team	Sauber C30	Ferrari 056 2.4 V8	AUS; DSQ	MAL; Ret	CHN; 17	TUR; 14	ESP; 9	MON; WD	CAN; WD	EUR; 11	GBR; 7	GER; 11	HUN; 15	BEL; Ret	ITA; Ret	SIN; 10	JPN; 8	KOR; 16	IND; 10	ABU; 11	BRA; 13						16th	14
2012	Sauber F1 Team	Sauber C31	Ferrari 056 2.4 V8	AUS; 8	MAL; 2	CHN; 11	BHR; 11	ESP; Ret	MON; 11	CAN; 3	EUR; 9	GBR; Ret	GER; 6	HUN; 14	BEL; Ret	ITA; 2	SIN; 10	JPN; Ret	KOR; 11	IND; Ret	ABU; 15	USA; 11	BRA; Ret					10th	66
2013	Vodafone McLaren Mercedes	McLaren MP4-28	Mercedes FO 108Z 2.4 V8	AUS; 11	MAL; 9	CHN; 11	BHR; 6	ESP; 9	MON; 16^{†}	CAN; 11	GBR; 20^{†}	GER; 8	HUN; 9	BEL; 11	ITA; 12	SIN; 8	KOR; 10	JPN; 15	IND; 5	ABU; 9	USA; 7	BRA; 6						11th	49
2014	Sahara Force India F1 Team	Force India VJM07	Mercedes PU106A Hybrid 1.6 V6 t	AUS; 10	MAL; DNS	BHR; 3	CHN; 9	ESP; 9	MON; Ret	CAN; 11^{†}	AUT; 6	GBR; 11	GER; 10	HUN; Ret	BEL; 8	ITA; 7	SIN; 7	JPN; 10	RUS; 10	USA; Ret	BRA; 15	ABU; 7						10th	59
2015	Sahara Force India F1 Team	Force India VJM08	Mercedes PU106B Hybrid 1.6 V6 t	AUS; 10	MAL; 13	CHN; 11	BHR; 8	ESP; 13	MON; 7	CAN; 11	AUT; 9																	9th	78
2015	Sahara Force India F1 Team	Force India VJM08B	Mercedes PU106B Hybrid 1.6 V6 t									GBR; 9	HUN; Ret	BEL; 5	ITA; 6	SIN; 7	JPN; 12	RUS; 3	USA; 5	MEX; 8	BRA; 12	ABU; 5						9th	78
2016	Sahara Force India F1 Team	Force India VJM09	Mercedes PU106C Hybrid 1.6 V6 t	AUS; 13	BHR; 16	CHN; 11	RUS; 9	ESP; 7	MON; 3	CAN; 10	EUR; 3	AUT; 17^{†}	GBR; 6	HUN; 11	GER; 10	BEL; 5	ITA; 8	SIN; 8	MAL; 6	JPN; 7	USA; 8	MEX; 10	BRA; 4	ABU; 8				7th	101
2017	Sahara Force India F1 Team	Force India VJM10	Mercedes M08 EQ Power+ 1.6 V6 t	AUS; 7	CHN; 9	BHR; 7	RUS; 6	ESP; 4	MON; 13	CAN; 5	AZE; Ret	AUT; 7	GBR; 9	HUN; 8	BEL; 17^{†}	ITA; 9	SIN; 5	MAL; 6	JPN; 7	USA; 8	MEX; 7	BRA; 9	ABU; 7					7th	100
2018	Sahara Force India F1 Team	Force India VJM11	Mercedes M09 EQ Power+ 1.6 V6 t	AUS; 11	BHR; 16	CHN; 12	AZE; 3	ESP; 9	MON; 12	CAN; 14	FRA; Ret	AUT; 7	GBR; 10	GER; 7	HUN; 14													8th	62
2018	Racing Point Force India F1 Team	Force India VJM11	Mercedes M09 EQ Power+ 1.6 V6 t													BEL; 5	ITA; 7	SIN; 16	RUS; 10	JPN; 7	USA; 8	MEX; Ret	BRA; 10	ABU; 8				8th	62
2019	SportPesa Racing Point F1 Team	Racing Point RP19	Mercedes M10 EQ Power+ 1.6 V6 t	AUS; 13	BHR; 10	CHN; 8	AZE; 6	ESP; 15	MON; 12	CAN; 12	FRA; 12	AUT; 11	GBR; 17	GER; Ret	HUN; 11	BEL; 6	ITA; 7	SIN; Ret	RUS; 7	JPN; 8	MEX; 7	USA; 10	BRA; 9	ABU; 7				10th	52
2020	BWT Racing Point F1 Team	Racing Point RP20	Mercedes M11 EQ Performance 1.6 V6 t	AUT; 6	STY; 6	HUN; 7	GBR; WD	70A	ESP; 5	BEL; 10	ITA; 10	TUS; 5	RUS; 4	EIF; 4	POR; 7	EMI; 6	TUR; 2	BHR; 18†	SKH; 1	ABU; Ret								4th	125
2021	Red Bull Racing Honda	Red Bull Racing RB16B	Honda RA621H 1.6 V6 t	BHR; 5	EMI; 11	POR; 4	ESP; 5	MON; 4	AZE; 1	FRA; 3	STY; 4	AUT; 6	GBR; 16	HUN; Ret	BEL; 19	NED; 8	ITA; 5	RUS; 9	TUR; 3	USA; 3	MXC; 3	SAP; 4	QAT; 4	SAU; Ret	ABU; 15†			4th	190
2022	Oracle Red Bull Racing	Red Bull Racing RB18	Red Bull RBPTH001 1.6 V6 t	BHR; 18†	**SAU**; 4	AUS; 2	EMI; 2^{3}	MIA; 4	ESP; 2	MON; 1	AZE; 2	CAN; Ret	GBR; 2	AUT; Ret^{5}	FRA; 4	HUN; 5	BEL; 2	NED; 5	ITA; 6	SIN; 1	JPN; 2	USA; 4	MXC; 3	SAP; 7^{5}	ABU; 3			3rd	305
2023	Oracle Red Bull Racing	Red Bull Racing RB19	Honda RBPTH001 1.6 V6 t	BHR; 2	**SAU**; 1	AUS; 5	AZE; 1^{1}	**MIA**; 2	MON; 16	ESP; 4	CAN; 6	AUT; 3^{2}	GBR; 6	HUN; 3	BEL; 2	NED; 4	ITA; 2	SIN; 8	JPN; Ret	QAT; 10	USA; 4^{5}	MXC; Ret	SAP; 4^{3}	LVG; 3	ABU; 4			2nd	285
2024	Oracle Red Bull Racing	Red Bull Racing RB20	Honda RBPTH002 1.6 V6 t	BHR; 2	SAU; 2	AUS; 5	JPN; 2	CHN; 3^{3}	MIA; 4^{3}	EMI; 8	MON; Ret	CAN; Ret	ESP; 8	AUT; 7^{8}	GBR; 17	HUN; 7	BEL; 7	NED; 6	ITA; 8	AZE; 17†	SIN; 10	USA; 7	MXC; 17	SAP; 11^{8}	LVG; 10	QAT; Ret	ABU; Ret	8th	152
2026	Cadillac Formula 1 Team	Cadillac MAC-26	Ferrari 067/6 1.6 V6 t	AUS; 16	CHN; 15	JPN; 17	MIA; 16	CAN; Ret	MON; 15	BCN; 14	AUT; Ret	GBR; 14	BEL; Ret	HUN; Ret	NED; 15	ITA; 18	ESP; Ret	AZE; 14	BHR; 19	SIN; 17	USA; 19	MXC; 16	SAP; 18	LVG	QAT	ABU		24th*	0*

^{†} Did not finish, but was classified as he had completed more than 90% of the race distance.
* Season still in progress.
