= Gerardo Bonilla =

Puerto Rican racing driver

Gerardo Bonilla is a San Juan, Puerto Rico-born professional race car driver. He competed in and won the IMSA Lites Championship (now Cooper Tires Prototype Lites) in 2007, the Star Mazda Championship in 2006, and the Skip Barber National Championship in 2005. He also works as an instructor for the Lucas Oil School of Racing.

In 2007 and 2008, Bonilla competed for B-K Motorsports as part of the factory Mazda entry in the American Le Mans Series LMP2 class alongside co-driver Ben Devlin. In 2009, he competed for Gotham Competition in the 24 Hours of Daytona, but does not have a full-time ride in any series. In 2010, he would serve as the full-time driver coach for the U.S. F2000 National Championship.
