= Hallett Motor Racing Circuit =

Road-racing course near Tulsa, Oklahoma

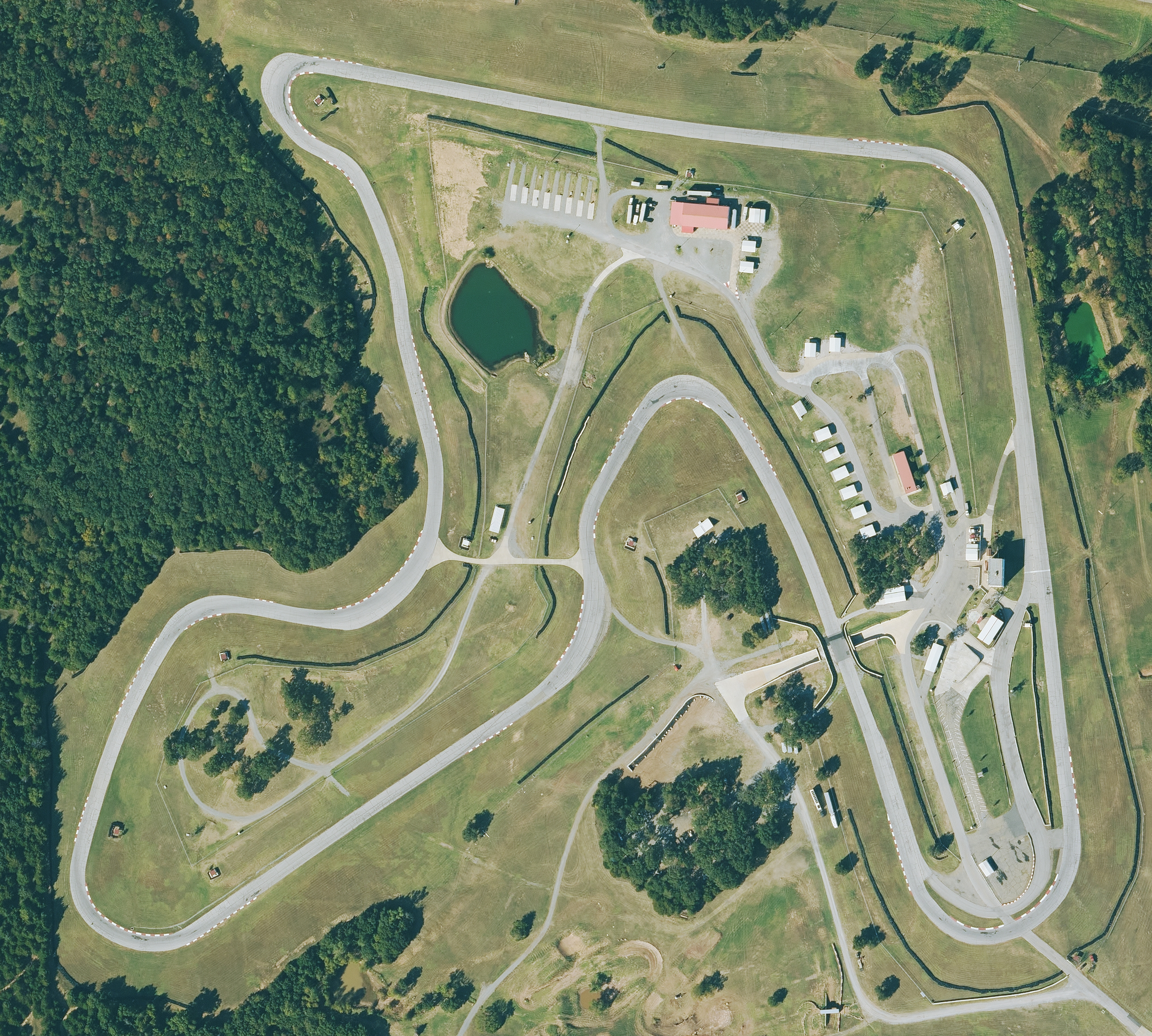
- 2023 aerial photo
- Location: Hallett, Oklahoma, U.S.
- Coordinates: 36°13′16″N 96°35′35″W
- Opened: 1976
- Major events: Former: Can-Am (1987); Trans-Am Series (1977, 1980); IMSA GT Championship (1977–1979)

Full Circuit (1976–present)
- Surface: Asphalt
- Length: 1.800 mi (2.897 km)
- Turns: 10
- Race lap record: 1:12.410 ( (United States) Al Lamb, Frissbee GR2, 1987, Can-Am)

Hallett Motor Racing Circuit is a road course about 35 mi (56 km) west of Tulsa in the Green Country of Oklahoma. The track has 10 turns in 1.800 mi (2.897 km), and over 80 ft (24 m) of elevation change. The track can also be configured to run both clockwise and counter-clockwise, yielding two distinct race courses.

Hallett Motor Racing Circuit hosts their own Competition Motor Sports Association (COMMA) events, as well as SCCA events. Motorcycles and high-speed go-karts also run at Hallett.

As well as Central Motorcycle Racing Association sanctioned races, the track also hosts COMMA High Speed Touring dates where regular cars and sports cars can experience laps on the circuit under more controlled circumstances. They also provide driver education classes and a full race instruction program.

Hallett hosted the second round of seven in the SCCA's final Can-Am season.

Hallett Motor Racing Circuit has been featured in many "best tracks in America" listicles.

== Lap records ==
The fastest official race lap records at the Hallett Motor Racing Circuit are listed as:

Category	Time	Driver	Vehicle	Event
Full Circuit (1976–present): 1.800 mi (2.897 km)
Can-Am	1:12.410	Al Lamb	Frissbee GR2	1987 Hallett Can-Am Thundercars round
IMSA GTO	1:16.060	Peter Gregg	Porsche 935/77A	1978 Hallett Grand Prix
Trans-Am	1:19.700	Peter Gregg	Porsche 934	1977 Hallett Trans-Am round
IMSA GTU	1:23.120	Dave White	BMW 320i	1979 Mother's Day Grand Prix

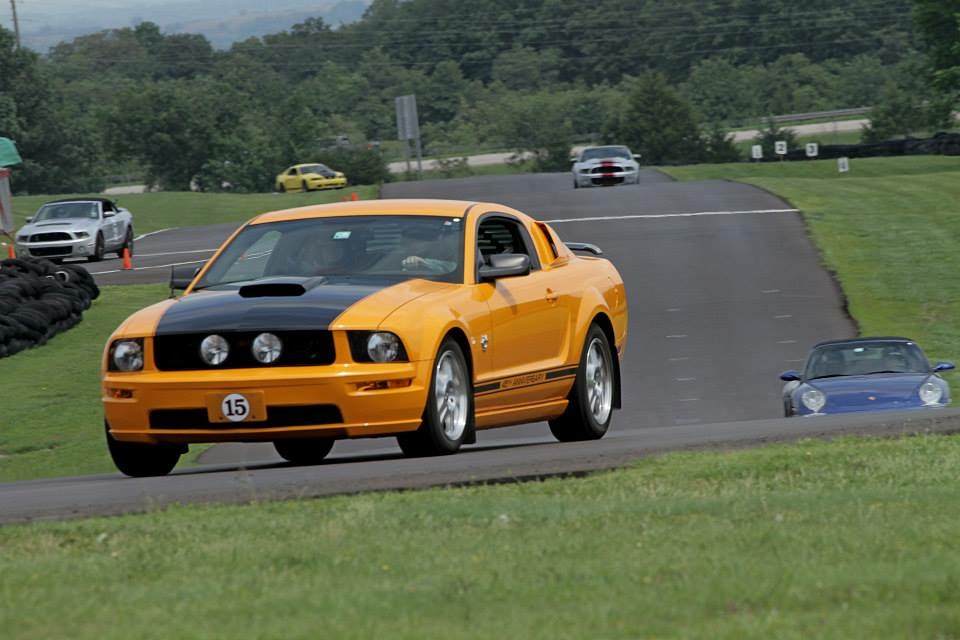
2009 Mustang at Hallett 2014 Shelby Meet
