= Fisichella Motor Sport =

Italian motorsport team

(Italy) Fisichella Motor Sport
- Founded: 2005
- Folded: 2015
- Team principal(s): Giancarlo Fisichella; Enrico Zanarini
- Former series: Italian Formula 3000; Euro Formula 3000; GP2 Series; Formula BMW Europe; Superleague Formula; Auto GP
- Teams' Championships: Italian Formula 3000: 2005; Euroseries 3000: 2006, 2009
- Drivers' Championships: Italian Formula 3000: 2005: Luca Filippi; 2006: Stefano Gattuso; Euroseries 3000: 2006: Stefano Gattuso

Fisichella Motor Sport is a motorsport team, founded by Italian Formula One driver Giancarlo Fisichella and his manager Enrico Zanarini.

== Racing history ==
=== Euroseries 3000 ===
Fisichella Motor Sport had a team, run by Scuderia Coloni, racing in the 2005 Italian Formula 3000 season. After a first season marked by the title of Luca Filippi, the team continued its domination of the discipline: in 2006, Giacomo Ricci won the title ahead of his teammate Marco Bonanomi, the FMS drivers having won 13 of the 18 races of the season. The 2007 season was much more difficult for the team which did not sign any victories, Luiz Razia only finishing third in the championship.

Fisichella International Racing surprisingly returned to racing via the 2014 Auto GP season, having replaced the short-lived Eurotech Engineering entry midway through the season at Round 5 in Imola. Fielding an all Italian line-up of Kevin Giovesi and Salvatore de Plano for 2014, the team managed three 2nd place finishes, all achieved by Giovesi, with de Plano's best result being 6th at the Red Bull Ring sprint race. For the 2015 season, neither Giovesi or de Plano were retained, instead, FMS brought in Italian Euroformula Open Championship driver Leonardo Pulcini for Hungary, along with Argentinian GP2 refugee Facu Regalia, who won the opening feature race, with Pulcini taking second in the sprint race, ahead of Regalia, who finished in 6th place. Only one car was run for Regalia in round 2 in Silverstone, before the 2015 season was folded due to low entry numbers, marking the end of the FMS name.

=== GP2 Series ===
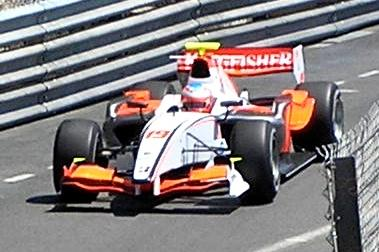
Adam Carroll driving for FMSI at the 2008 Monaco GP2 Series round.

At the end of 2005, Formula One driver Giancarlo Fisichella joined forces with Coloni. Luca Filippi, who moved across to GP2 with FMSI in 2006. He was joined by Turkey's Jason Tahincioglu, who brought sponsorship from Petrol Ofisi. Giorgio Pantano achieved a respectable fifth place overall. He won one of the two races in Magny-Cours and both races on his home circuit in Monza. Pantano replaced the somewhat disappointing Luca Filippi, whose best result with the team was a fifth place at Imola. Filippi moved to BCN Competición after the first three race weekends, where he replaced Timo Glock, who in turn had moved to iSport International. The second driver, the Turk Jason Tahincioğlu, had a weak year, his best finish being eleventh in Monza. In the team ranking, FSMI took fifth place overall.

At the start of the 2007 season in the GP2 series, the team expected an upward trend after last year's fifth place, especially since Antonio Pizzonia, a driver with Formula 1 experience, had been hired. However, Pizzonia proved to be a disappointment as he was only able to score a single point, at the race in Monaco. He was replaced by Adam Carroll from the fourth race weekend. Caroll won the home race at Silverstone and at the Hungaroring. Three more podium finishes followed and he finished seventh overall. Jason Tahincioglu didn't achieve a top 10 finish in any race and disappointed again. The team finished ninth overall.

In 2008 the team ran in the colours of Fisichella's F1 team Force India. The team originally planned to use Spanish drivers Andy Soucek and Adrián Vallés in the GP2 series, but both were replaced around the first race weekend in Barcelona. Roldán Rodríguez took over the cockpit from Souček before the start of the first race. A short time later, Vallés moved to the BCN Competición team and was replaced by Adam Carroll. After the race in Monaco, the team parted ways with Carroll and gave the second cockpit place to the Estonian Marko Asmer.[2] In the overall ranking of the 2008 season, it was only enough for tenth place.

=== Coloni buyout ===
Andreas Zuber and Luiz Razia joined the team for 2009. After the sixth round of the season, the Coloni team took back full control of the team after buying out Fisichella. It also had a new sponsorship deal with PartyPokerRacing.com. The deal also applies to their Formula BMW Europe team.

At the following round of the championship, Coloni's cars were impounded as a result of an injunction obtained by Soucek as part of his dispute with the team in its FMSI guise. The team missed the qualifying session and were thus ruled out of competing in either of the weekend's races.

=== Formula BMW ===
Since 2008, FMS has been active in the European Formula BMW Championship. They drive there with 3 drivers: Pedro Bianchini, Mihai Marinescu and Oliver Millroy.

=== Superleague Formula ===
In 2008, Fisichella Motor Sport participated in the Superleague Formula by fielding a car in the colors of AS Roma entrusted to Enrico Toccacelo and Franck Perera. The team ranks 5th in the championship with three podiums.

== Complete series results ==
=== GP2 Series ===
Year	Team	Chassis	Engine	Tyres	Drivers	Races	Wins	Poles	F.L.	Points	D.C.	T.C.
2006	(Italy) FMS International (1–2) (Italy) Petrol Ofisi FMS International (3–11)	Dallara; GP2/05	Mecachrome; V8108 V8	B	(Italy) Luca Filippi	6	0	0	0	7	19th	5th
2006	(Italy) FMS International (1–2) (Italy) Petrol Ofisi FMS International (3–11)	Dallara; GP2/05	Mecachrome; V8108 V8	B	(Italy) Giorgio Pantano	15	3	0	0	44	5th	5th
2006	(Italy) FMS International (1–2) (Italy) Petrol Ofisi FMS International (3–11)	Dallara; GP2/05	Mecachrome; V8108 V8	B	(Turkey) Jason Tahinci	21	0	0	0	0	30th	5th
2007	(Italy) Petrol Ofisi FMS International	Dallara; GP2/05	Mecachrome; V8108 V8	B	(Brazil) Antônio Pizzonia	5	0	0	0	1	27th	9th
2007	(Italy) Petrol Ofisi FMS International	Dallara; GP2/05	Mecachrome; V8108 V8	B	(United Kingdom) Adam Carroll	16	2	0	1	36	7th	9th
2007	(Italy) Petrol Ofisi FMS International	Dallara; GP2/05	Mecachrome; V8108 V8	B	(Turkey) Jason Tahinci	20	0	0	0	0	33rd	9th
2008	(Italy) Fisichella Motor Sport International	Dallara; GP2/08	Mecachrome; V8108 V8	B	(Spain) Roldán Rodríguez	20	0	0	0	14	13th	10th
2008	(Italy) Fisichella Motor Sport International	Dallara; GP2/08	Mecachrome; V8108 V8	B	(Spain) Adrián Vallés	2	0	0	0	0	21st	10th
2008	(Italy) Fisichella Motor Sport International	Dallara; GP2/08	Mecachrome; V8108 V8	B	(United Kingdom) Adam Carroll	4	0	0	0	1	25th	10th
2008	(Italy) Fisichella Motor Sport International	Dallara; GP2/08	Mecachrome; V8108 V8	B	(Estonia) Marko Asmer	13	0	0	0	0	29th	10th
2009	(Italy) FMSI (1–6) (Italy) Party Poker Racing.com SC (7–10)	Dallara; GP2/08	Mecachrome; V8108 V8	B	(United Arab Emirates) Andreas Zuber	18	0	0	0	21	13th	10th
2009	(Italy) FMSI (1–6) (Italy) Party Poker Racing.com SC (7–10)	Dallara; GP2/08	Mecachrome; V8108 V8	B	(Brazil) Luiz Razia	18	1	0	1	8	19th	10th

=== In detail ===
(key) (Races in bold indicate pole position) (Races in italics indicate fastest lap)

Year	Chassis Engine Tyres	Drivers	1	2	3	4	5	6	7	8	9	10	11	12	13	14	15	16	17	18	19	20	21	T.C.	Points
2006	GP2/05; Renault; **B**		VAL; FEA	VAL; SPR	SMR; FEA	SMR; SPR	NÜR; FEA	NÜR; SPR	CAT; FEA	CAT; SPR	MON; FEA	SIL; FEA	SIL; SPR	MAG; FEA	MAG; SPR	HOC; FEA	HOC; SPR	HUN; FEA	HUN; SPR	IST; FEA	IST; SPR	MNZ; FEA	MNZ; SPR	5th	46
2006	GP2/05; Renault; **B**	(Italy) Luca Filippi	Ret	Ret	11	5	Ret	Ret																5th	46
2006	GP2/05; Renault; **B**	(Italy) Giorgio Pantano							9	7	Ret	5	4	6	1	4	5	3	13	Ret	Ret	1	1	5th	46
2006	GP2/05; Renault; **B**	(Turkey) Jason Tahinci	DNS	Ret	Ret	Ret	DSQ	18	15	19	Ret	13	16	Ret	17	17	17	Ret	14	17	17	11	13	5th	46
2007	GP2/05; Renault; **B**		BHR; FEA	BHR; SPR	CAT; FEA	CAT; SPR	MON; FEA	MAG; FEA	MAG; SPR	SIL; FEA	SIL; SPR	NÜR; FEA	NÜR; SPR	HUN; FEA	HUN; SPR	IST; FEA	IST; SPR	MNZ; FEA	MNZ; SPR	SPA; FEA	SPA; SPR	VAL; FEA	VAL; SPR	9th	37
2007	GP2/05; Renault; **B**	(Brazil) Antônio Pizzonia	16	Ret	Ret	8	8																	9th	37
2007	GP2/05; Renault; **B**	(United Kingdom) Adam Carroll						DSQ	14	6	1	Ret	14	1	2	3	3	Ret	15	Ret	6	Ret	15	9th	37
2007	GP2/05; Renault; **B**	(Turkey) Jason Tahinci	Ret	13	DNS	Ret	Ret	15	18	19	16	17^{†}	19	Ret	11	14	Ret	11	20	14	20	13	Ret	9th	37
2008	GP2/08; Renault; **B**		CAT; FEA	CAT; SPR	IST; FEA	IST; SPR	MON; FEA	MON; FEA	MAG; FEA	MAG; SPR	SIL; FEA	SIL; SPR	HOC; FEA	HOC; SPR	HUN; FEA	HUN; SPR	VAL; FEA	VAL; SPR	SPA; FEA	SPA; SPR	MNZ; FEA	MNZ; SPR		10th	15
2008	GP2/08; Renault; **B**	(Spain) Roldán Rodríguez	Ret	Ret	12	13	6	4	Ret	16	11	Ret	18	15	19	Ret	Ret	10	21^{†}	Ret	6	2		10th	15
2008	GP2/08; Renault; **B**	(Spain) Adrián Vallés	18	11																				10th	15
2008	GP2/08; Renault; **B**	(United Kingdom) Adam Carroll			8	Ret	Ret	Ret																10th	15
2008	GP2/08; Renault; **B**	(Estonia) Marko Asmer							17	11	20	13	14	12	18	Ret	DNS	Ret	16	Ret	Ret	Ret		10th	15
2009	GP2/08; Renault; **B**		CAT; FEA	CAT; SPR	MON; FEA	MON; FEA	IST; FEA	IST; SPR	SIL; FEA	SIL; SPR	NÜR; FEA	NÜR; SPR	HUN; FEA	HUN; SPR	VAL; FEA	VAL; SPR	SPA; FEA	SPA; SPR	MNZ; FEA	MNZ; SPR	ALG; FEA	ALG; SPR		10th	29
2009	GP2/08; Renault; **B**	(United Arab Emirates) Andreas Zuber	Ret	Ret	3	5	9	19	8	2	3	Ret	Ret	17	16	Ret			12	Ret	8	12		10th	29
2009	GP2/08; Renault; **B**	(Brazil) Luiz Razia	16	12	13	10	Ret	20	20^{†}	Ret	Ret	14	Ret	Ret	Ret	13			8	1	10	17		10th	29

=== GP2 Asia Series ===
(key) (Races in bold indicate pole position) (Races in italics indicate fastest lap)

Year	Chassis Engine Tyres	Drivers	1	2	3	4	5	6	7	8	9	10	11	12	T.C.	Points
2008	GP2/05; Renault; **B**		DUB1; FEA	DUB1; SPR	SEN; FEA	SEN; SPR	SEP; FEA	SEP; SPR	BHR; FEA	BHR; SPR	DUB2; FEA	DUB2; SPR			7th	19
2008	GP2/05; Renault; **B**	(Spain) Adrián Vallés	4	Ret	2	5	Ret	20	5	Ret	Ret	10			7th	19
2008	GP2/05; Renault; **B**	(Romania) Michael Herck	Ret	17	9	12	11	11	15	14					7th	19
2008	GP2/05; Renault; **B**	(Spain) Roldán Rodríguez									15	Ret			7th	19
2008–09	GP2/05; Renault; **B**		SHI; FEA	SHI; SPR	DUB3; FEA	DUB3; SPR	BHR1; FEA	BHR1; SPR	LSL; FEA	LSL; SPR	SEP; FEA	SEP; SPR	BHR2; FEA	BHR2; SPR	12th	0
2008–09	GP2/05; Renault; **B**	(United Arab Emirates) Andreas Zuber	Ret	Ret	Ret	C									12th	0
2008–09	GP2/05; Renault; **B**	(Venezuela) Rodolfo González					16	Ret	Ret	19	10	8	Ret	Ret	12th	0
2008–09	GP2/05; Renault; **B**	(United States) Kevin Chen	Ret	15	18	C	21	21	18	23	20	Ret	Ret	18	12th	0

=== Superleague Formula ===
Year	Car	Teams	Races	Wins	Poles	F.L.	Points	T.C.
2008	Panoz DP09-Menard	(Italy) A.S. Roma	12	0	1	0	307	5th
