= 2009 Spa-Francorchamps GP2 Series round =

(Belgium) 2009 Belgian GP2 round
Round details
- Round 8 of 10 rounds in the 2009 GP2 Series
- Circuit de Spa-Francorchamps
- Location: Circuit de Spa-Francorchamps, Francorchamps, Wallonia, Belgium
- Course: Permanent racing facility 7.004 km (4.352 mi)

GP2 Series

Feature race
- Date: 29 August 2009
- Laps: 25

Pole position
Driver	(Portugal) Álvaro Parente	O. Racing Technology
- Time: 1:54.970

Podium
First	(Portugal) Álvaro Parente	O. Racing Technology
Second	(Germany) Nico Hülkenberg	ART Grand Prix
Third	(Brazil) Lucas di Grassi	F. B. Racing Engineering

Fastest lap
Driver	(Portugal) Álvaro Parente	O. Racing Technology
- Time: 1:57.468 (on lap 22)

Sprint race
- Date: 30 August 2009
- Laps: 18

Podium
First	(Netherlands) Giedo van der Garde	iSport International
Second	(Spain) Roldán Rodríguez	Piquet GP
Third	(Brazil) Diego Nunes	iSport International

Fastest lap
Driver	(Mexico) Sergio Pérez	Arden International
- Time: 1:56.731 (on lap 7)

The 2009 Belgian GP2 round was the seventh race of the 2009 GP2 Series season. It was held on 29 August and 30, 2009 at Circuit de Spa-Francorchamps near the village of Francorchamps, Wallonia, Belgium. The race was used as a support race to the 2009 Belgian Grand Prix.

== Report ==
=== Background ===
PartyPokerRacing.com Scuderia Coloni, along with their drivers Andreas Zuber and Luiz Razia, were forced to miss the round due to unresolved financial disputes.

=== Qualifying ===
Álvaro Parente achieved the first pole position in his GP2 Series career, and also recorded the first pole for his team Ocean Racing Technology.

=== Feature Race ===
The start of the race was delayed by 15 minutes due to a serious accident at the depot when Davide Rigon's car number one mechanic, 57-year-old Trident Racing team mechanic Vasco Rossi, was injured when a wheel gun was left in the path of Ricardo Teixeira's car as he was leaving the pits to join the dummy grid, causing the air hose to get caught by the rear wheel and dragging a metal beam down on to Rossi's head. Stefano Coletti hit the barrier very hard

Parente won the 100th race in GP2 history – again the first for his team – and the second of his career.

== Classification ==
=== Qualifying ===
Pos	No	Name	Team	Time	Grid
1	25	(Portugal) Álvaro Parente	Ocean Racing Technology	1:54.970	1
2	2	(Brazil) Lucas di Grassi	Fat Burner Racing Engineering	1:55.050	5
3	10	(Germany) Nico Hülkenberg	ART Grand Prix	1:55.102	2
4	4	(Brazil) Diego Nunes	iSport International	1:55.150	3
5	5	(Russia) Vitaly Petrov	Barwa Addax Team	1:55.152	4
6	24	(India) Karun Chandhok	Ocean Racing Technology	1:55.170	6
7	11	(Mexico) Sergio Pérez	Telmex Arden International	1:55.210	7
8	5	(Spain) Roldán Rodríguez	Piquet GP	1:55.255	8
9	9	(Venezuela) Pastor Maldonado	ART Grand Prix	1:55.462	9
10	17	(Japan) Kamui Kobayashi	DAMS	1:55.482	10
11	8	(Spain) Dani Clos	Fat Burner Racing Engineering	1:55.517	11
12	3	(Netherlands) Giedo van der Garde	iSport International	1:55.560	12
13	15	(Spain) Javier Villa	Super Nova Racing	1:55.785	13
14	19	(Italy) Davide Rigon	Trident Racing	1:55.806	14
15	16	(Belgium) Jérôme d'Ambrosio	DAMS	1:55.822	15
16	26	(Romania) Michael Herck	David Price Racing	1:55.858	16
17	2	(Italy) Davide Valsecchi	Barwa Addax Team	1:55.928	17
18	14	(Italy) Luca Filippi	Super Nova Racing	1:56.061	18
19	6	(Brazil) Alberto Valerio	Piquet GP	1:56.063	19
20	12	(Italy) Edoardo Mortara	Telmex Arden International	1:56.285	20
21	22	(Monaco) Stefano Coletti	Durango	1:56.634	21
22	18	(Portugal) Ricardo Teixeira	Trident Racing	1:57.688	22
23	23	(France) Nelson Panciatici	Durango	1:57.792	23
DNQ	27	(France) Franck Perera	David Price Racing	2:24.927	—

- ^1 Lucas di Grassi was issued a 3 place grid-penalty for impeding Karun Chandhok.
- ^2 Franck Perera did not participate in either race, as he qualified outside 107% of Álvaro Parente's pole position time, and was not within the same rule during free practice.

=== Feature Race ===
Pos	No	Driver	Team	Laps	Time/Retired	Grid	Points
1	25	(Portugal) Álvaro Parente	Ocean Racing Technology	25	0:54:12.997	1	10 + 2 + 1
2	10	(Germany) Nico Hülkenberg	ART Grand Prix	25	+0.943	2	8
3	7	(Brazil) Lucas di Grassi	Fat Burner Racing Engineering	25	+3.179	5	6
4	9	(Venezuela) Pastor Maldonado	ART Grand Prix	25	+3.468	9	5
5	5	(Spain) Roldán Rodríguez	Piquet GP	25	+4.349	8	4
6	3	(Netherlands) Giedo van der Garde	iSport International	25	+4.687	12	3
7	17	(Japan) Kamui Kobayashi	DAMS	25	+5.459	10	2
8	12	(Italy) Edoardo Mortara	Telmex Arden International	25	+5.972	20	1
9	4	(Brazil) Diego Nunes	iSport International	25	+29.105	3	
10	8	(Spain) Dani Clos	Fat Burner Racing Engineering	25	+32.315	11	
11	23	(France) Nelson Panciatici	Durango	25	+35.474	23	
12	22	(Monaco) Stefano Coletti	Durango	23	Accident	21	
13	15	(Spain) Javier Villa	Super Nova Racing	22	+3 laps	13	
Ret	16	(Belgium) Jérôme d'Ambrosio	DAMS	20	Retired	15	
Ret	14	(Italy) Luca Filippi	Super Nova Racing	13	Collision	18	
Ret	2	(Italy) Davide Valsecchi	Barwa Addax Team	13	Collision	17	
Ret	24	(India) Karun Chandhok	Ocean Racing Technology	7	Collision	6	
Ret	19	(Italy) Davide Rigon	Trident Racing	7	Collision	14	
Ret	1	(Russia) Vitaly Petrov	Barwa Addax Team	6	Collision damage	4	
Ret	6	(Brazil) Alberto Valerio	Piquet GP	0	Accident	19	
Ret	11	(Mexico) Sergio Pérez	Telmex Arden International	0	Collision	7	
Ret	26	(Romania) Michael Herck	David Price Racing	0	Collision	16	
Ret	18	(Portugal) Ricardo Teixeira	Trident Racing	0	Collision	22	
DNQ	27	(France) Franck Perera	David Price Racing				
Fastest lap: Álvaro Parente (Ocean Racing Technology) 1:57.468 (lap 22)

- Diego Nunes, Dani Clos and Nelson Panciatici were given 25-second time penalties by the race stewards as a result of various incidents during the feature race.

=== Sprint Race ===
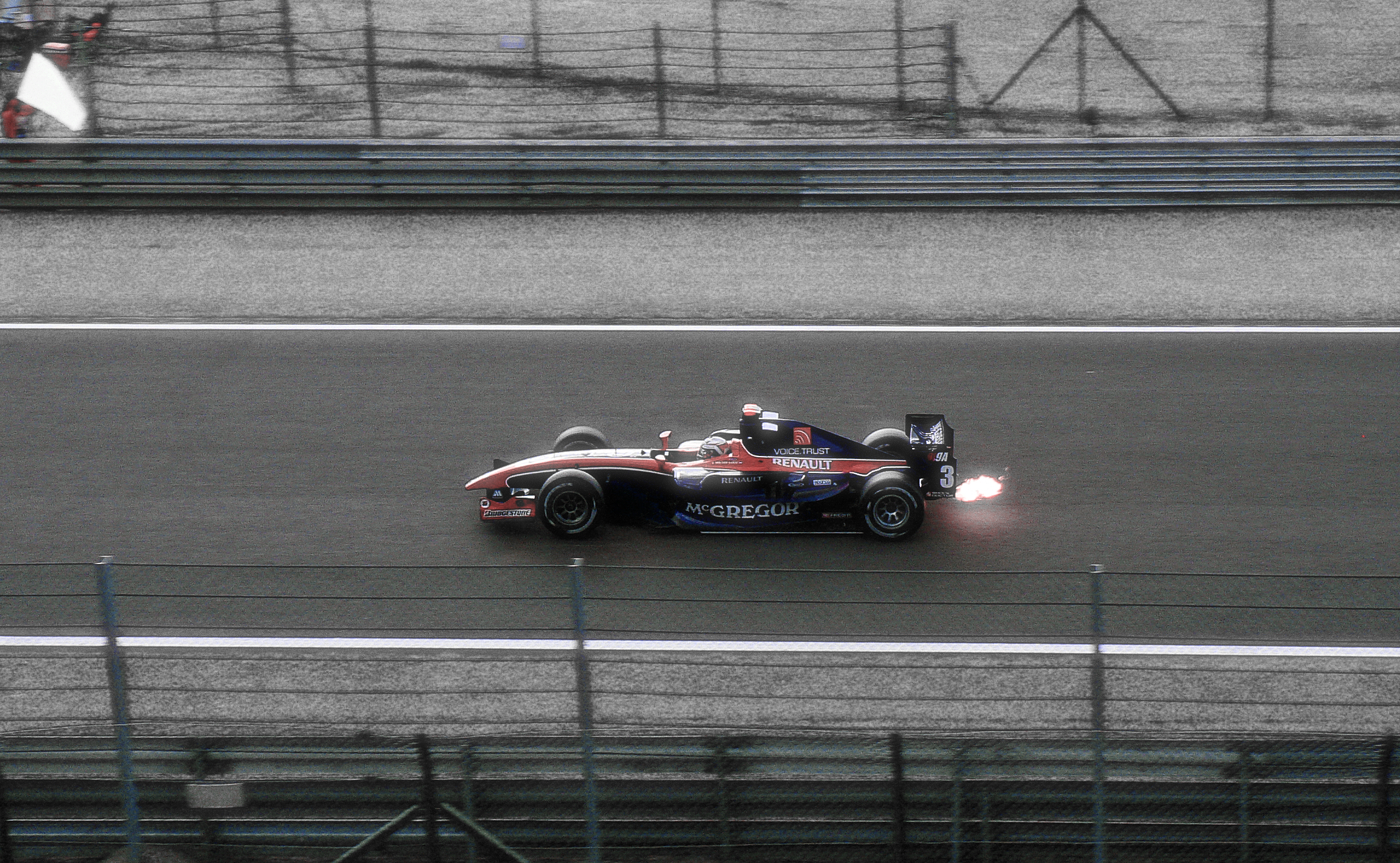
Giedo van der Garde won the sprint race.

Pos	No	Driver	Team	Laps	Time/Retired	Grid	Points
1	3	(Netherlands) Giedo van der Garde	iSport International	18	37:54.281	3	6
2	5	(Spain) Roldán Rodríguez	Piquet GP	18	+3.102	4	5
3	4	(Brazil) Diego Nunes	iSport International	18	+4.998	9	4
4	11	(Mexico) Sergio Pérez	Telmex Arden International	18	+6.292	22	3 + 1
5	19	(Italy) Davide Rigon	Trident Racing	18	+13.809	17	2
6	1	(Russia) Vitaly Petrov	Barwa Addax Team	18	+17.459	18	1
7	24	(India) Karun Chandhok	Ocean Racing Technology	18	+18.800	16	
8	2	(Italy) Davide Valsecchi	Barwa Addax Team	18	+20.039	15	
9	26	(Romania) Michael Herck	David Price Racing	18	+21.403	19	
10	15	(Spain) Javier Villa	Super Nova Racing	18	+22.860	12	
11	17	(Japan) Kamui Kobayashi	DAMS	18	+25.291	2	
12	6	(Brazil) Alberto Valerio	Piquet GP	18	+36.045	20	
13	23	(France) Nelson Panciatici	Durango	18	+48.746	11	
14	18	(Portugal) Ricardo Teixeira	Trident Racing	18	+54.779	21	
Ret	12	(Italy) Edoardo Mortara	Telmex Arden International	4	Collision damage	1	
Ret	7	(Brazil) Lucas di Grassi	Fat Burner Racing Engineering	4	Collision	6	
Ret	25	(Portugal) Álvaro Parente	Ocean Racing Technology	2	Retired	8	
Ret	9	(Venezuela) Pastor Maldonado	ART Grand Prix	1	Accident	5	
Ret	10	(Germany) Nico Hülkenberg	ART Grand Prix	0	Collision	7	
Ret	8	(Spain) Dani Clos	Fat Burner Racing Engineering	0	Collision	10	
Ret	16	(Belgium) Jérôme d'Ambrosio	DAMS	0	Collision	13	
Ret	14	(Italy) Luca Filippi	Super Nova Racing	0	Collision	14	
DNS	22	(Monaco) Stefano Coletti	Durango		Injury		
DNQ	27	(France) Franck Perera	David Price Racing				
Fastest lap: Sergio Pérez (Telmex Arden International) 1:56.731 (lap 7)

== Standings after the round ==
Drivers' Championship standings

Pos	Driver	Points
1	(Germany) Nico Hülkenberg	83
2	(Russia) Vitaly Petrov	56
3	(Brazil) Lucas di Grassi	46
4	(France) Romain Grosjean	45
5	(Venezuela) Pastor Maldonado	36

Teams' Championship standings

Pos	Team	Points
1	(France) ART Grand Prix	119
2	(Spain) Barwa Addax Team	101
3	(Spain) Fat Burner Racing Engineering	46
4	(United Kingdom) Super Nova Racing	44
5	(Brazil) Piquet GP	37

- Note: Only the top five positions are included for both sets of standings.

Previous round: 2009 European GP2 round	GP2 Series; 2009 season	Next round: 2009 Italian GP2 round
Previous round: 2008 Spa-Francorchamps GP2 Series round	Belgian GP2 round	Next round: 2010 Belgian GP2 round
