= 2009 Algarve GP2 Series round =

(Portugal) 2009 Portuguese GP2 round
Round details
- Round 10 of 10 rounds in the 2009 GP2 Series
- Autódromo Internacional do Algarve
- Location: Autódromo Internacional do Algarve; Portimão, Portugal
- Course: Permanent racing facility 4.692 km (2.915 mi)

GP2 Series

Feature race
- Date: 19 September 2009
- Laps: 37

Pole position
Driver	(Russia) Vitaly Petrov	Barwa Addax Team
- Time: 1:30.819

Podium
First	(Germany) Nico Hülkenberg	ART Grand Prix
Second	(Italy) Luca Filippi	Super Nova Racing
Third	(Brazil) Lucas di Grassi	F. B. Racing Engineering

Fastest lap
Driver	(Brazil) Diego Nunes	iSport International
- Time: 1:32.113 (on lap 14)

Sprint race
- Date: 20 September 2009
- Laps: 24

Podium
First	(Italy) Luca Filippi	Super Nova Racing
Second	(Spain) Javier Villa	Super Nova Racing
Third	(Spain) Dani Clos	F. B. Racing Engineering

Fastest lap
Driver	(Germany) Nico Hülkenberg	ART Grand Prix
- Time: 1:32.388 (on lap 10)

The 2009 Portuguese GP2 round was the final round of the 2009 GP2 Series season. It was held on September 19 and 20, 2009 at Autódromo Internacional do Algarve at Portimão, Portugal. This race was the only race in the 2009 GP2 Series season that was not acting as a support race for Formula One, instead supporting a 2009 FIA GT Algarve 2 Hours event.

== Report ==
=== Background ===
As Nico Hülkenberg claimed the drivers title at the previous round in Monza, only the battle for the Teams championship could be fought in the Algarve. This was the final GP2 race for Hülkenberg, as he would step up to Formula One in 2010. Durango team was forced to also lose this round of not being able to hire any pilot to compete.

=== Feature race ===
Vitaly Petrov started on pole for the feature race, with Dani Clos qualifying a career best second. GP2 Champion Hülkenberg started from third on the grid, but got a good start down into turn 1, where he slotted in behind Petrov. After a few laps behind the Russian, Hülkenberg made the decision to pit first. His gamble eventually paid off as after Petrov stopped, Hülkenberg gained the lead and never looked back, winning by 10 seconds. Petrov faded afterwards, by finishing in fourth, with Luca Filippi battling his way through the field to finish second ahead of a surging Lucas di Grassi. Roldán Rodríguez was fifth behind Petrov, with Michael Herck earning his first points in GP2 in sixth, before stewards disqualified him. Kamui Kobayashi finished seventh, while Davide Valsecchi finished eighth, both moved up one place after Herck's disqualification, with Valsecchi scoring his first points for Barwa Addax Team. Andreas Zuber finished ninth but was promoted to the reverse-grid pole. With Hülkenberg winning, both championship battles finished, as he earned enough points for ART Grand Prix to win the teams championship.

=== Sprint race ===
The Sprint Race was equally thrilling, with a large collision at the start. Vitaly Petrov struggled to get away in his Barwa Addax car, with the car's anti-stall system kicking in race was red flagged. Most drivers passed him, but Michael Herck was not so lucky and crashed into the back of him, hitting the pit wall afterwards. It ended a miserable weekend for the Romanian, who lost what would have been his first GP2 points finish in Race 1 due to a technical infringement. The crash left the main straight covered with debris and prompted a suspension while the mess was cleaned up. After nearly half an hour the field was led back out behind the safety car, with Coloni's Andreas Zuber leading from Davide Valsecchi, Kamui Kobayashi, Lucas di Grassi, Luca Filippi, Nico Hülkenberg and Pastor Maldonado. Zuber backed the field up at the final corner in preparation for the green flag on lap six, but timed his charge too early and shot past the safety car as it was still entering the pit lane. The top seven, with the exception of Filippi, passed the safety car and were all duly given drive-through penalties. After the penalties were issued, Filippi was in the lead. He never looked back and won by over 4 seconds to claim his first win since 2007, and his team's first win of the season. Sergio Pérez was second on the road ahead of Filippi's team-mate Javier Villa. Dani Clos scored his first points of the season in fourth, with Álvaro Parente and Diego Nunes completing the top six. Pérez lost his second place due to a post-race time penalty for overtaking under the safety car. He slipped to eleventh, giving Super Nova a 1-2 and third place in the teams championship on countback.

== Classification ==
=== Qualifying ===
Pos	No	Driver	Team	Time	Grid
1	1	(Russia) Vitaly Petrov	Addax Team	1:30.819	1
2	8	(Spain) Dani Clos	Racing Engineering	1:30.859	2
3	10	(Germany) Nico Hülkenberg	ART Grand Prix	1:30.884	3
4	7	(Brazil) Lucas di Grassi	Racing Engineering	1:31.067	4
5	2	(Italy) Davide Valsecchi	Addax Team	1:31.129	5
6	5	(Spain) Roldán Rodríguez	Piquet GP	1:31.389	6
7	6	(Brazil) Alberto Valerio	Piquet GP	1:31.418	7
8	9	(Venezuela) Pastor Maldonado	ART Grand Prix	1:31.449	8
9	3	(Netherlands) Giedo van der Garde	iSport International	1:31.532	9
10	4	(Brazil) Diego Nunes	iSport International	1:31.569	10
11	16	(Belgium) Jérôme d'Ambrosio	DAMS	1:31.601	11
12	20	(United Arab Emirates) Andreas Zuber	Scuderia Coloni	1:31.569	12
13	14	(Italy) Luca Filippi	Super Nova Racing	1:31.764	13
14	15	(Spain) Javier Villa	Super Nova Racing	1:31.812	14
15	11	(Mexico) Sergio Pérez	Arden International	1:31.886	15
16	21	(Brazil) Luiz Razia	Scuderia Coloni	1:32.140	16
17	19	(Italy) Davide Rigon	Trident Racing	1:32.165	17
18	17	(Japan) Kamui Kobayashi	DAMS	1:32.183	18
19	26	(Romania) Michael Herck	David Price Racing	1:32.376	19
20	12	(Italy) Edoardo Mortara	Arden International	1:32.552	20
21	24	(India) Karun Chandhok	Ocean Racing Technology	1:32.765	21
22	27	(Venezuela) Johnny Cecotto Jr.	David Price Racing	1:32.807	22
23	18	(Portugal) Ricardo Teixeira	Trident Racing	1:34.083	23
24	25	(Portugal) Álvaro Parente	Ocean Racing Technology	no time	24

- ^1 Johnny Cecotto Jr. did not make the grid due to a crash after leaving the pits.

== Standings after the round ==
Drivers' Championship standings

Pos	Driver	Points
1	(Germany) Nico Hülkenberg	100
2	(Russia) Vitaly Petrov	75
3	(Brazil) Lucas di Grassi	63
4	(France) Romain Grosjean	45
5	(Italy) Luca Filippi	40

Teams' Championship standings

Pos	Team	Points
1	(France) ART Grand Prix	136
2	(Spain) Addax Team	122
3	(United Kingdom) Super Nova Racing	67
4	(Spain) Racing Engineering	67
5	(United Kingdom) iSport International	42

- Note: Only the top five positions are included for both sets of standings.

Previous round: 2009 Italian GP2 round	GP2 Series; 2009 season	Next round: 2010 Spanish GP2 round
Previous round: none	Portuguese GP2 round	Next round: none
