= 2009 Monaco GP2 Series round =

Motor racing competition

2009 Monaco GP2 round
Round details
- Round 2 of 10 rounds in the 2009 GP2 Series
- Circuit de Monaco
- Location: Circuit de Monaco; Monte Carlo, Monaco
- Course: Street Course; 3.34 km (2.08 mi)

GP2 Series

Feature race
- Date: 22 May 2009
- Laps: 45

Pole position
Driver	(France) Romain Grosjean	Barwa Addax Team
- Time: 1:19.498

Podium
First	(France) Romain Grosjean	Barwa Addax Team
Second	(Russia) Vitaly Petrov	Barwa Addax Team
Third	(Brazil) Lucas di Grassi	Racing Engineering

Fastest lap
Driver	(France) Romain Grosjean	Barwa Addax Team
- Time: 1:21.823 (on lap 30)

Sprint race
- Date: 23 May 2009
- Laps: 27

Podium
First	(Venezuela) Pastor Maldonado	ART Grand Prix
Second	(Belgium) Jérôme d'Ambrosio	DAMS
Third	(Germany) Nico Hülkenberg	ART Grand Prix

Fastest lap
Driver	(Russia) Vitaly Petrov	Barwa Addax Team
- Time: 1:22.045 (on lap 9)

The 2009 Monaco GP2 Series round was a GP2 Series motor race held on 22 and 23 May 2009 at the Circuit de Monaco on the streets of the country. It was the second race of the 2009 GP2 Season. The race was used as a support race for the 2009 Monaco Grand Prix

== Report ==
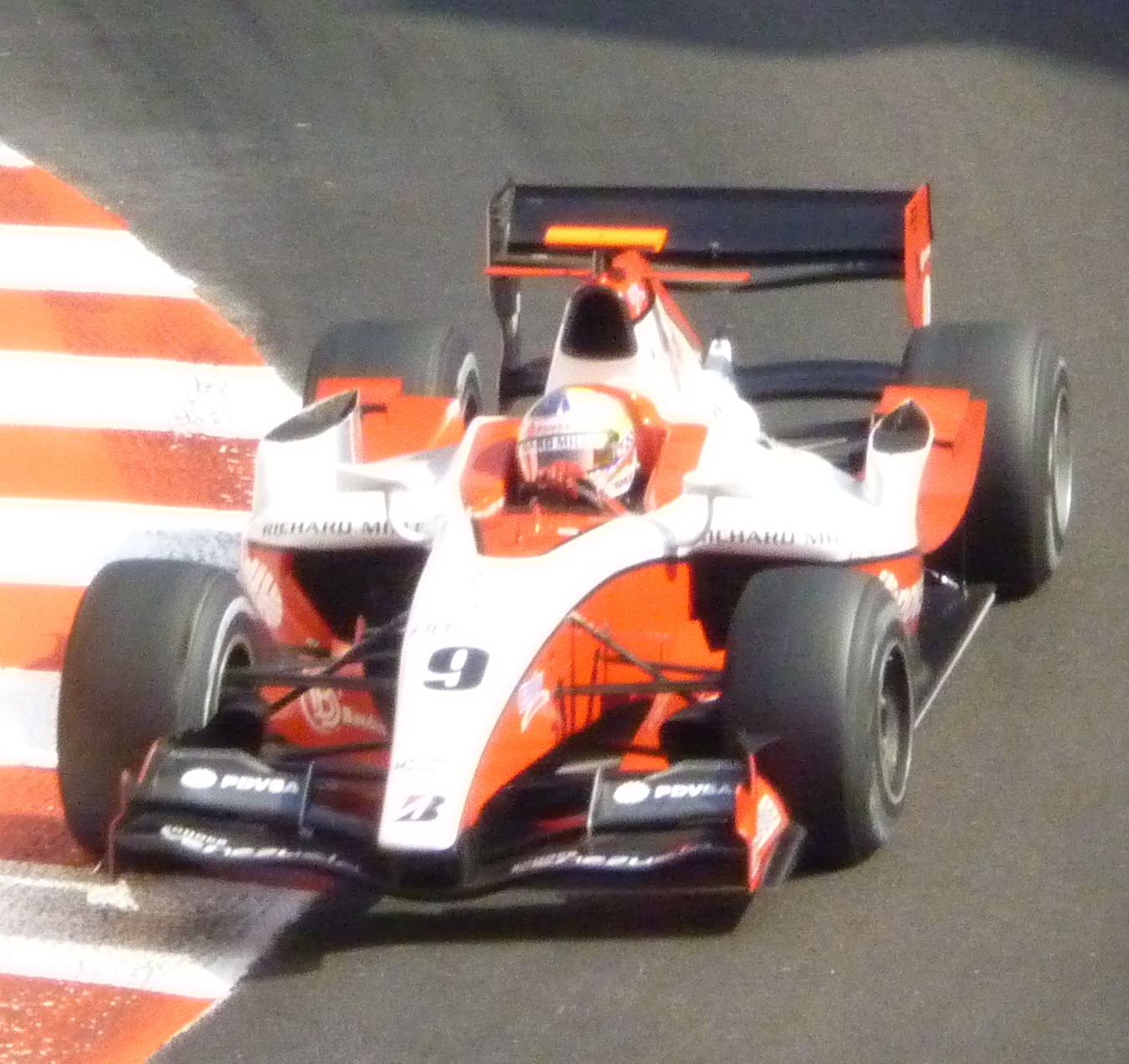
Pastor Maldonado

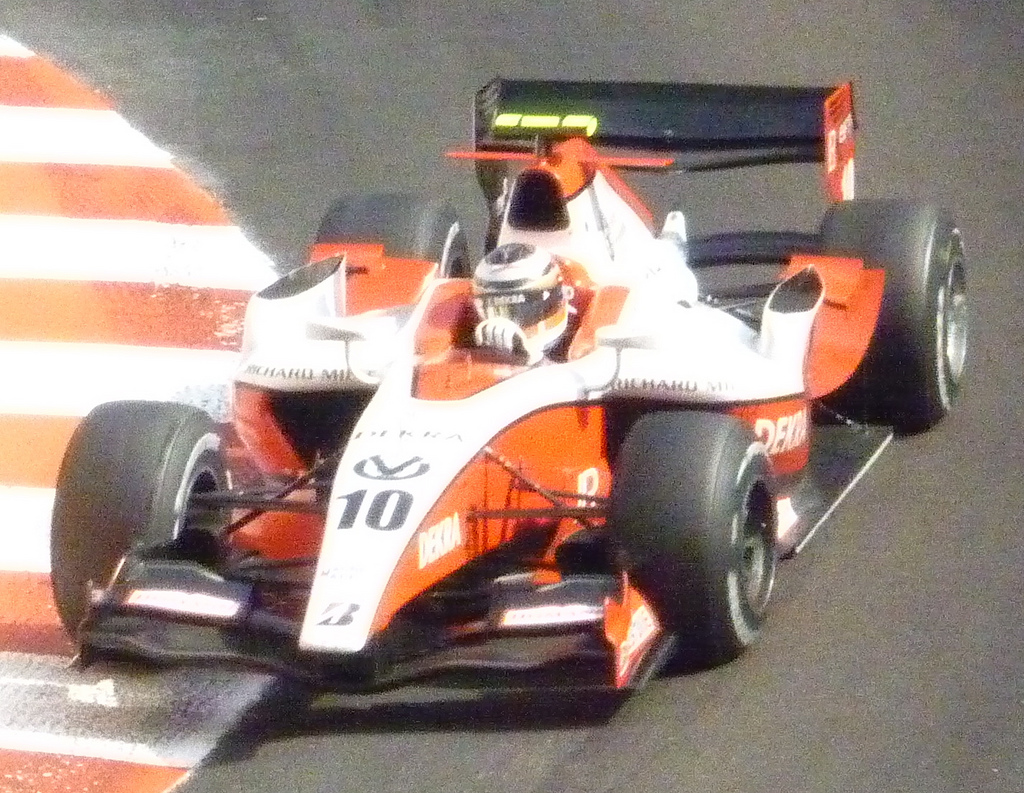
Nico Hülkenberg

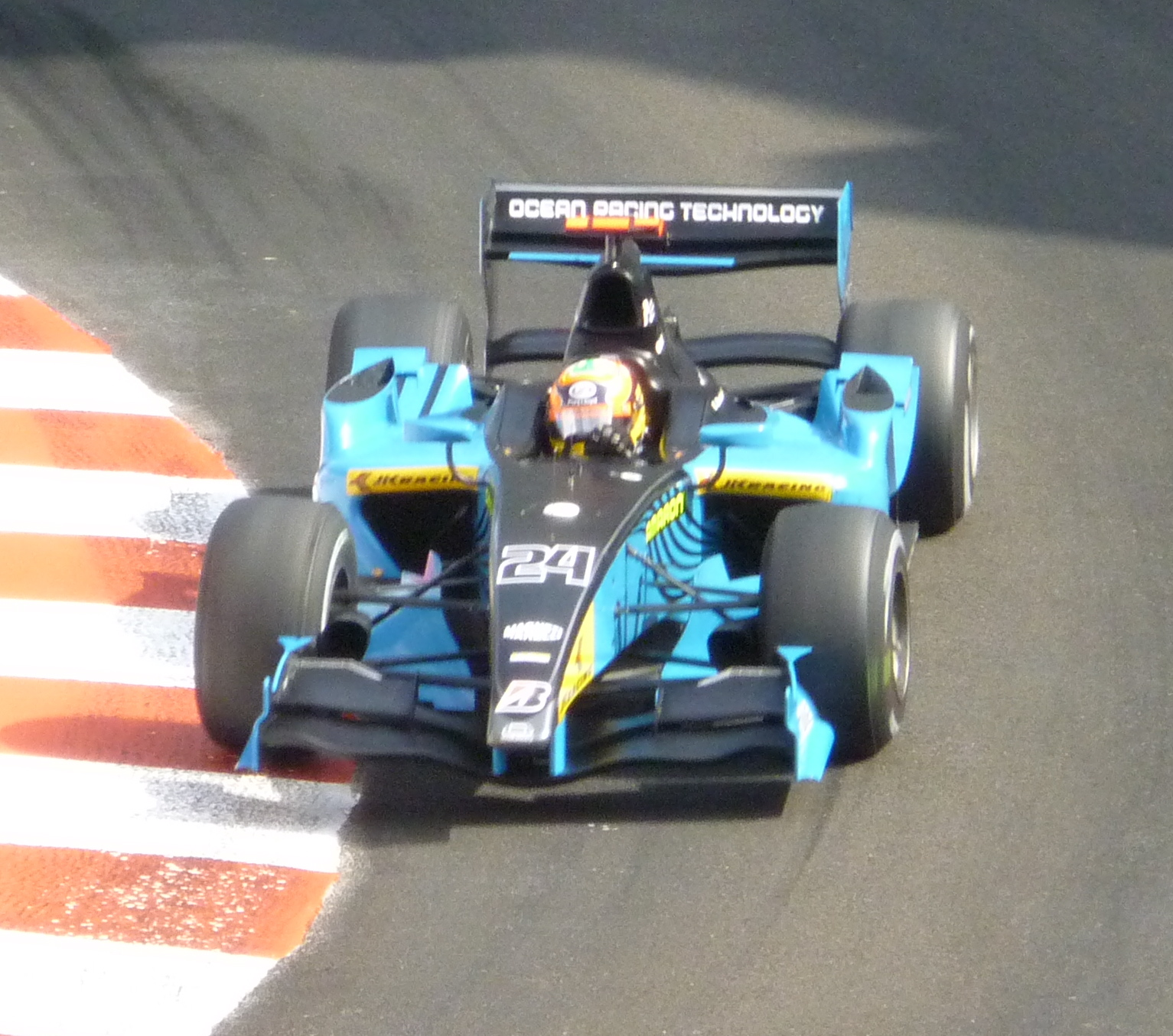
Karun Chandhok

The first race once again resulted in a one-two finish for Barwa Addax Team drivers Romain Grosjean and Vitaly Petrov, with Lucas di Grassi promoted to third for Fat Burner Racing Engineering, after Nico Hülkenberg was demoted after cutting a corner.

The red flagged second race was won by Pastor Maldonado for ART Grand Prix, with Jérôme d'Ambrosio and Hülkenberg also on the podium. Romain Grosjean had a big accident in the final stages, where he was unhurt, but it did bring out the red flag which ended the race 2 laps shy of the end.

== Classification ==
=== Qualifying ===
Pos	No	Driver	Team	Time	Grid
1	2	(France) Romain Grosjean	Barwa Addax Team	1:19.498	1
2	1	(Russia) Vitaly Petrov	Barwa Addax Team	1:19.948	2
3	10	(Germany) Nico Hülkenberg	ART Grand Prix	1:20.053	3
4	20	(United Arab Emirates) Andreas Zuber	Fisichella Motor Sport	1:20.065	4
5	7	(Brazil) Lucas di Grassi	Fat Burner Racing Engineering	1:20.308	5
6	25	(Portugal) Álvaro Parente	Ocean Racing Technology	1:20.423	6
7	16	(Belgium) Jérôme d'Ambrosio	DAMS	1:20.494	7
8	14	(Italy) Luca Filippi	Super Nova Racing	1:20.573	8
9	6	(Brazil) Alberto Valerio	Piquet GP	1:20.597	9
10	24	(India) Karun Chandhok	Ocean Racing Technology	1:20.608	10
11	15	(Spain) Javier Villa	Super Nova Racing	1:20.634	11
12	23	(Mexico) Sergio Pérez	Telmex Arden International	1:20.735	12
13	8	(Spain) Dani Clos	Fat Burner Racing Engineering	1:20.750	13
14	9	(Venezuela) Pastor Maldonado	ART Grand Prix	1:20.806	14
15	3	(Netherlands) Giedo van der Garde	iSport International	1:20.933	15
16	22	(Italy) Davide Valsecchi	Durango	1:21.072	16
17	17	(Japan) Kamui Kobayashi	DAMS	1:21.136	17
18	12	(Italy) Edoardo Mortara	Telmex Arden International	1:21.204	18
19	19	(Italy) Davide Rigon	Trident Racing	1:21.268	19
20	5	(Spain) Roldán Rodríguez	Piquet GP	1:21.390	20
21	4	(Brazil) Diego Nunes	iSport International	1:22.052	21
22	21	(Brazil) Luiz Razia	Fisichella Motor Sport	1:22.447	22
23	27	(Italy) Giacomo Ricci	David Price Racing	1:22.746	23
24	26	(Romania) Michael Herck	David Price Racing	1:23.056	24
25	23	(France) Nelson Panciatici	Durango	1:23.479	25
26	18	(Portugal) Ricardo Teixeira	Trident Racing	1:25.710	26

=== Race 1 ===
Pos	No	Driver	Team	Laps	Time/retired	Grid	Points
1	2	(France) Romain Grosjean	Barwa Addax Team	45	1:03:06.299	1	10+2+1
2	1	(Russia) Vitaly Petrov	Barwa Addax Team	45	+6.600	2	8
3	20	(United Arab Emirates) Andreas Zuber	Fisichella Motor Sport	45	+31.040	4	6
4	7	(Brazil) Lucas di Grassi	Fat Burner Racing Engineering	45	+47.984	5	5
5	10	(Germany) Nico Hülkenberg	ART Grand Prix	45	+49.443	3	4
6	16	(Belgium) Jérôme d'Ambrosio	DAMS	45	+59.777	7	3
7	24	(India) Karun Chandhok	Ocean Racing Technology	45	+1:01.789	10	2
8	9	(Venezuela) Pastor Maldonado	ART Grand Prix	45	+1:20.236	14	1
9	19	(Italy) Davide Rigon	Trident Racing	45	+1:21.248	19	
10	15	(Spain) Javier Villa	Super Nova Racing	45	+1:35.089	11	
11	5	(Spain) Roldán Rodríguez	Piquet GP	45	+1:36.546	20	
12	11	(Mexico) Sergio Pérez	Telmex Arden International	44	+1 Lap	12	
13	21	(Brazil) Luiz Razia	Fisichella Motor Sport	44	+1 Lap	22	
14	27	(Italy) Giacomo Ricci	David Price Racing	44	+1 Lap	23	
15	22	(Italy) Davide Valsecchi	Durango	43	+2 Laps	16	
16	26	(Romania) Michael Herck	David Price Racing	43	+2 Laps	24	
NC	3	(Netherlands) Giedo van der Garde	iSport International	38	+7 Laps	15	
Ret	25	(Portugal) Álvaro Parente	Ocean Racing Technology	36	Collision	6	
Ret	12	(Italy) Edoardo Mortara	Telmex Arden International	35	Collision	18	
Ret	14	(Italy) Luca Filippi	Super Nova Racing	34	Accident	8	
Ret	17	(Japan) Kamui Kobayashi	DAMS	18	Accident	17	
Ret	8	(Spain) Dani Clos	Fat Burner Racing Engineering	16	Accident	13	
Ret	4	(Brazil) Diego Nunes	iSport International	13	Accident	21	
Ret	6	(Brazil) Alberto Valerio	Piquet GP	5	Accident	9	
Ret	23	(France) Nelson Panciatici	Durango	4	Accident	25	
DNQ	18	(Portugal) Ricardo Teixeira	Trident Racing	0	Did not qualify		

=== Race 2 ===
Pos	No	Driver	Team	Laps	Time/retired	Grid	Points
1	9	(Venezuela) Pastor Maldonado	ART Grand Prix	27	39:02.772	1	6
2	16	(Belgium) Jérôme d'Ambrosio	DAMS	27	+1.505	3	5
3	10	(Germany) Nico Hülkenberg	ART Grand Prix	27	+3.545	4	4
4	7	(Brazil) Lucas di Grassi	Fat Burner Racing Engineering	27	+4.480	5	3
5	20	(United Arab Emirates) Andreas Zuber	Fisichella Motor Sport	27	+6.494	6	2
6	1	(Russia) Vitaly Petrov	Barwa Addax Team	27	+9.349	7	1+1
7	19	(Italy) Davide Rigon	Trident Racing	27	+10.448	9	
8	15	(Spain) Javier Villa	Super Nova Racing	27	+53.234	10	
9	11	(Mexico) Sergio Pérez	Telmex Arden International	27	+56.237	12	
10	21	(Brazil) Luiz Razia	Fisichella Motor Sport	27	+57.770	13	
11	3	(Netherlands) Giedo van der Garde	iSport International	27	+58.582	17	
12	17	(Japan) Kamui Kobayashi	DAMS	27	+59.696	21	
13	12	(Italy) Edoardo Mortara	Telmex Arden International	27	+1:03.710	19	
14	4	(Brazil) Diego Nunes	iSport International	27	+1:04.840	23	
15	23	(France) Nelson Panciatici	Durango	27	+1:07.681	25	
16	26	(Romania) Michael Herck	David Price Racing	26	+1 Lap	16	
17	2	(France) Romain Grosjean	Barwa Addax Team	25	Accident	8	
18	22	(Italy) Davide Valsecchi	Durango	25	+2 Laps	15	
Ret	8	(Spain) Dani Clos	Fat Burner Racing Engineering	23	Accident	22	
Ret	6	(Brazil) Alberto Valerio	Piquet GP	23	Retired	24	
Ret	14	(Italy) Luca Filippi	David Price Racing	23	Accident	20	
Ret	24	(India) Karun Chandhok	Ocean Racing Technology	21	Mechanical	2	
Ret	27	(Italy) Giacomo Ricci	David Price Racing	18	Retired	14	
Ret	25	(Portugal) Álvaro Parente	Ocean Racing Technology	15	Retired	18	
Ret	5	(Spain) Roldán Rodríguez	Piquet GP	1	Wheel nut	11	
DNQ	18	(Portugal) Ricardo Teixeira	Trident Racing	0	Did not qualify		

== Standings after the round ==
Drivers' Championship standings

Pos	Driver	Points
1	(France) Romain Grosjean	31
2	(Russia) Vitaly Petrov	18
3	(Belgium) Jérôme d'Ambrosio	18
4	(Venezuela) Pastor Maldonado	12
5	(Italy) Edoardo Mortara	10

Teams' Championship standings

Pos	Team	Points
1	(Spain) Barwa Addax Team	49
2	(France) DAMS	21
3	(France) ART Grand Prix	20
4	(Netherlands) Telmex Arden International	10
5	(Italy) Fisichella Motor Sport	8

- Note: Only the top five positions are included for both sets of standings.

Previous round: 2009 Spanish GP2 round	GP2 Series; 2009 season	Next round: 2009 Turkish GP2 round
Previous round: 2008 Monaco GP2 Series round	Monaco GP2 round	Next round: 2010 Monaco GP2 round
