= 2009 Nürburgring GP2 Series round =

(Germany) 2009 German GP2 round
Round details
- Round 5 of 10 rounds in the 2009 GP2 Series
- Nürburgring
- Location: Nürburgring, Nürburg, Germany
- Course: Permanent racing facility 5.15 km (3.12 mi)

GP2 Series

Feature race
- Date: 11 July 2009
- Laps: 35

Pole position
Driver	(Germany) Nico Hülkenberg	ART Grand Prix
- Time: 1:38.161

Podium
First	(Germany) Nico Hülkenberg	ART Grand Prix
Second	(Spain) Roldán Rodríguez	Piquet GP
Third	(United Arab Emirates) Andreas Zuber	Fisichella Motor Sport

Fastest lap
Driver	(Germany) Nico Hülkenberg	ART Grand Prix
- Time: 1:41.126 (on lap 13)

Sprint race
- Date: 12 July 2009
- Laps: 24

Podium
First	(Germany) Nico Hülkenberg	ART Grand Prix
Second	(Portugal) Álvaro Parente	O. Racing Technology
Third	(Japan) Kamui Kobayashi	DAMS

Fastest lap
Driver	(Brazil) Alberto Valerio	Piquet GP
- Time: 1:46.200 (on lap 23)

The 2009 German GP2 round was the fifth round of the 2009 GP2 Series season. It was hold on July 11 and July 12, 2009 at the Nürburgring in Nürburg, Germany. The race was used as a support race to the 2009 German Grand Prix.

The race saw the return of the Nürburgring after the Hockenheimring hosted last year's event. Last year's feature race winner, Giorgio Pantano, did not take part. The sprint race winner Karun Chandhok did compete though.

The weekend was dominated by Nico Hülkenberg, who took pole, won both races and got fastest lap for both races. He is only the second driver to complete this feat, after Nelson Piquet Jr. did so in 2006. Hülkenberg left his home country with the championship lead.

== Standings after the round ==
Drivers' Championship standings

Pos	Driver	Points
1	(Germany) Nico Hülkenberg	46
2	(France) Romain Grosjean	42
3	(Russia) Vitaly Petrov	41
4	(Venezuela) Pastor Maldonado	26
5	(Brazil) Lucas di Grassi	26

Teams' Championship standings

Pos	Team	Points
1	(Spain) Barwa Addax Team	83
2	(France) ART Grand Prix	72
3	(Spain) Fat Burner Racing Engineering	26
4	(United Kingdom) Super Nova Racing	25
5	(France) DAMS	25

- Note: Only the top five positions are included for both sets of standings.

Previous round: 2009 British GP2 round	GP2 Series; 2009 season	Next round: 2009 Hungarian GP2 round
Previous round: 2007 Nürburgring GP2 Series round	Nürburgring GP2 round	Next round: 2011 Nürburgring GP2 Series round
