= 2009 Catalunya GP2 Series round =

2009 GP2 race held in Spain

(Spain) 2009 Spanish GP2 round
Round details
- Round 1 of 10 rounds in the 2009 GP2 Series
- Circuit de Catalunya
- Location: Circuit de Catalunya; Montmeló, Spain
- Course: Permanent racing facility 4.655 km (2.892 mi)

GP2 Series

Feature race
- Date: 9 May 2009
- Laps: 43

Pole position
Driver	(France) Romain Grosjean	Barwa Campos Team
- Time: 1:27.510

Podium
First	(France) Romain Grosjean	Barwa Campos Team
Second	(Russia) Vitaly Petrov	Barwa Campos Team
Third	(Belgium) Jérôme d'Ambrosio	DAMS

Fastest lap
Driver	(France) Romain Grosjean	Barwa Campos Team
- Time: 1:31.070 (on lap 5)

Sprint race
- Date: 10 May 2009
- Laps: 26

Podium
First	(Italy) Edoardo Mortara	Telmex Arden International
Second	(France) Romain Grosjean	Barwa Campos Team
Third	(Belgium) Jérôme d'Ambrosio	DAMS

Fastest lap
Driver	(Italy) Edoardo Mortara	Telmex Arden International
- Time: 1:30.063 (on lap 4)

The 2009 Spanish GP2 round was a GP2 Series motor race held on May 9 and May 10, 2009 at the Circuit de Catalunya in Montmeló, Spain. It was the first race of the 2009 GP2 Season. The race was used to support the 2009 Spanish Grand Prix

== Report ==
The first race resulted in a one-two finish for Barwa Campos Team drivers Romain Grosjean and Vitaly Petrov, with Jérôme d'Ambrosio finishing third for DAMS.

The second race was won by Edoardo Mortara for Telmex Arden International, with Romain Grosjean and Jérôme d'Ambrosio also on the podium. Mortara finished sixth in his first race, so was automatically on Pole for race 2. He wins in his first ever GP2 Weekend.

== Classification ==
=== Qualifying ===
Pos	No	Driver	Team	Time	Grid
1	2	(France) Romain Grosjean	Barwa Campos Team	1:27.510	1
2	7	(Brazil) Lucas di Grassi	Fat Burner Racing Engineering	1:27.531	2
3	1	(Russia) Vitaly Petrov	Barwa Campos Team	1:28.027	3
4	10	(Germany) Nico Hülkenberg	ART Grand Prix	1:28.088	4
5	20	(United Arab Emirates) Andreas Zuber	FMSI	1:28.090	5
6	14	(Italy) Luca Filippi	Super Nova Racing	1:28.195	9^{1}
7	16	(Belgium) Jérôme d'Ambrosio	DAMS	1:28.209	6
8	4	(Brazil) Diego Nunes	iSport International	1:28.253	7
9	5	(Spain) Roldán Rodríguez	Piquet GP	1:28.266	8
10	9	(Venezuela) Pastor Maldonado	ART Grand Prix	1:28.283	10
11	11	(Mexico) Sergio Pérez	Telmex Arden International	1:28.374	11
12	15	(Spain) Javier Villa	Super Nova Racing	1:28.381	15^{1}
13	12	(Italy) Edoardo Mortara	Telmex Arden International	1:28.451	12
14	24	(India) Karun Chandhok	Ocean Racing Technology	1:28.488	13
15	25	(Portugal) Álvaro Parente	Ocean Racing Technology	1:28.608	14
16	6	(Brazil) Alberto Valerio	Piquet GP	1:28.688	16
17	8	(Spain) Dani Clos	Fat Burner Racing Engineering	1:28.691	17
18	3	(Netherlands) Giedo van der Garde	iSport International	1:28.796	18
19	19	(Italy) Davide Rigon	Trident Racing	1:28.872	19
20	22	(Italy) Davide Valsecchi	Durango	1:29.164	20
21	21	(Brazil) Luiz Razia	FMSI	1:29.185	21
22	17	(Japan) Kamui Kobayashi	DAMS	1:29.350	22
23	27	(Italy) Giacomo Ricci	DPR	1:29.524	23
24	23	(France) Nelson Panciatici	Durango	1:29.560	24
25	18	(Portugal) Ricardo Teixeira	Trident Racing	1:31.115	25
26	26	(Romania) Michael Herck	DPR	1:31.875	26

Notes

- – Luca Filippi and Javier Villa was handed a 3-place grid penalty for failing to sufficiently heed yellow flags during free practice.

=== Race 1 ===
Pos	No	Driver	Team	Laps	Time/Retired	Grid	Points
1	2	(France) Romain Grosjean	Barwa Campos Team	39	1:02:22.709	1	10 + 2 + 1
2	1	(Russia) Vitaly Petrov	Barwa Campos Team	39	+2.459	3	8
3	16	(Belgium) Jérôme d'Ambrosio	DAMS	39	+6.349	7	6
4	14	(Italy) Luca Filippi	Super Nova Racing	39	+8.346	6	5
5	9	(Venezuela) Pastor Maldonado	ART Grand Prix	39	+8.741	10	4
6	12	(Italy) Edoardo Mortara	Telmex Arden International	39	+12.529	13	3
7	3	(Netherlands) Giedo van der Garde	iSport International	39	+12.748	18	2
8	17	(Japan) Kamui Kobayashi	DAMS	39	+14.063	22	1
9	10	(Germany) Nico Hülkenberg	ART Grand Prix	39	+14.260	4	
10	15	(Spain) Javier Villa	Super Nova Racing	39	+15.200	12	
11	4	(Brazil) Diego Nunes	iSport International	39	+16.669	8	
12	23	(France) Nelson Panciatici	Durango	39	+17.756	24	
13	26	(Romania) Michael Herck	DPR	39	+18.445	26	
14	11	(Mexico) Sergio Pérez	Telmex Arden International	39	+18.595	11	
15	6	(Brazil) Alberto Valerio	Piquet GP	39	+1:04.629	16	
16	21	(Brazil) Luiz Razia	FMSI	38	+1 Lap	21	
17	19	(Italy) Davide Rigon	Trident Racing	38	+1 Lap	19	
Ret	7	(Brazil) Lucas di Grassi	Fat Burner Racing Engineering	32	Collision	2	
Ret	25	(Portugal) Álvaro Parente	Ocean Racing Technology	32	Collision	15	
Ret	8	(Spain) Dani Clos	Fat Burner Racing Engineering	31	Mechanical	17	
Ret	24	(India) Karun Chandhok	Ocean Racing Technology	27	Retired	14	
Ret	5	(Spain) Roldán Rodríguez	Piquet GP	25	Retired	9	
Ret	22	(Italy) Davide Valsecchi	Durango	16	Spun off	20	
Ret	18	(Portugal) Ricardo Teixeira	Trident Racing	11	Accident	25	
Ret	20	(United Arab Emirates) Andreas Zuber	FMSI	5	Retired	5	
Ret	27	(Italy) Giacomo Ricci	DPR	1	Collision damage	23	

=== Race 2 ===
Pos	No	Driver	Team	Laps	Time/Retired	Grid	Points
1	12	(Italy) Edoardo Mortara	Telmex Arden International	26	39:55.235	3	6 + 1
2	2	(France) Romain Grosjean	Barwa Campos Team	26	+1.251	8	5
3	16	(Belgium) Jérôme d'Ambrosio	DAMS	26	+6.516	6	4
4	3	(Netherlands) Giedo van der Garde	iSport International	26	+14.638	2	3
5	17	(Japan) Kamui Kobayashi	DAMS	26	+17.170	1	2
6	9	(Venezuela) Pastor Maldonado	ART Grand Prix	26	+20.099	4	1
7	14	(Italy) Luca Filippi	Super Nova Racing	26	+28.971	5	
8	4	(Brazil) Diego Nunes	iSport International	26	+29.258	11	
9	1	(Russia) Vitaly Petrov	Barwa Campos Team	26	+29.433	7	
10	7	(Brazil) Lucas di Grassi	Fat Burner Racing Engineering	26	+31.038	18	
11	25	(Portugal) Álvaro Parente	Ocean Racing Technology	26	+32.026	19	
12	21	(Brazil) Luiz Razia	FMSI	26	+33.167	16	
13	6	(Brazil) Alberto Valerio	Piquet GP	26	+33.789	15	
14	10	(Germany) Nico Hülkenberg	ART Grand Prix	26	+34.278	9	
15	27	(Italy) Giacomo Ricci	DPR	26	+38.913	26	
16	22	(Italy) Davide Valsecchi	Durango	26	+40.811	23	
17	11	(Mexico) Sergio Pérez	Telmex Arden International	26	+42.258	14	
18	23	(France) Nelson Panciatici	Durango	26	+59.664	12	
19	8	(Spain) Dani Clos	Fat Burner Racing Engineering	26	+59.747	20	
20	18	(Portugal) Ricardo Teixeira	Trident Racing	26	+1:00.052	24	
21	19	(Italy) Davide Rigon	Trident Racing	25	+1 Lap	17	
Ret	24	(India) Karun Chandhok	Ocean Racing Technology	21	Retired	21	
Ret	15	(Spain) Javier Villa	Super Nova Racing	17	Retired	10	
Ret	26	(Romania) Michael Herck	DPR	12	Retired	13	
Ret	20	(United Arab Emirates) Andreas Zuber	FMSI	9	Spun off	25	
Ret	5	(Spain) Roldán Rodríguez	Piquet GP	0	Accident	22	

== Standings after the round ==
Drivers' Championship standings

Pos	Driver	Points
1	(France) Romain Grosjean	18
2	(Italy) Edoardo Mortara	10
3	(Belgium) Jérôme d'Ambrosio	10
4	(Russia) Vitaly Petrov	8
5	(Italy) Luca Filippi	5

Teams' Championship standings

Pos	Team	Points
1	(Spain) Barwa Campos Team	26
2	(France) DAMS	13
3	(Netherlands) Telmex Arden International	10
4	(United Kingdom) iSport International	5
5	(United Kingdom) Super Nova Racing	5

- Note: Only the top five positions are included for both sets of standings.

Previous round: 2008 Monza GP2 Series round	GP2 Series; 2009 season	Next round: 2009 Monaco GP2 Series round
Previous round: 2008 Catalunya GP2 Series round	Spanish GP2 round	Next round: 2010 Catalunya GP2 Series round
