= Enrico Zanarini =

Italian manager

- Born: 9 September 1952 (age 73)

Enrico Zanarini (born 9 September 1952) is an Italian manager.

== Biography ==
Zanarini was born in Bologna, Italy. He started his career in driver management in the early 1970s when he was a marketing director for Alfa Romeo in Australia and South Pacific area. After relocating his business interests to Europe in 1986, Zanarini decided to pursue sponsorship and driver management full-time, managing drivers in F3 and F3000.

In 1994 Zanarini began his nine-year relationship with Eddie Irvine, consolidating his full-time driver management role in 1996 and supporting Irvine's career with Ferrari and Jaguar.

In 2003, Zanarini signed Giancarlo Fisichella, assisting him during the winning years with Renault F1 and later orchestrating the Italian driver's celebrated move to Ferrari in 2009. During this period, Zanarini expanded into team management and development of young driver talents by setting up Fisichella Motor Sport (FMS) in partnership with Fisichella.

At the end of 2011, Zanarini secured the management of Tonio Liuzzi in F1, thus becoming one of the most experienced driver managers in the sport.

Most recently, Zanarini in 2013 signed Antonio Fuoco (then-member of Ferrari Driver Academy) and in 2015 he also signed Antonio Giovinazzi.

== See also ==
- Eddie Irvine
- Fisichella Motor Sport
- Giancarlo Fisichella
- Antonio Fuoco
- Antonio Giovinazzi
