= 2009 Silverstone GP2 Series round =

Car race

(United Kingdom) 2009 British GP2 round
Round details
- Round 4 of 10 rounds in the 2009 GP2 Series
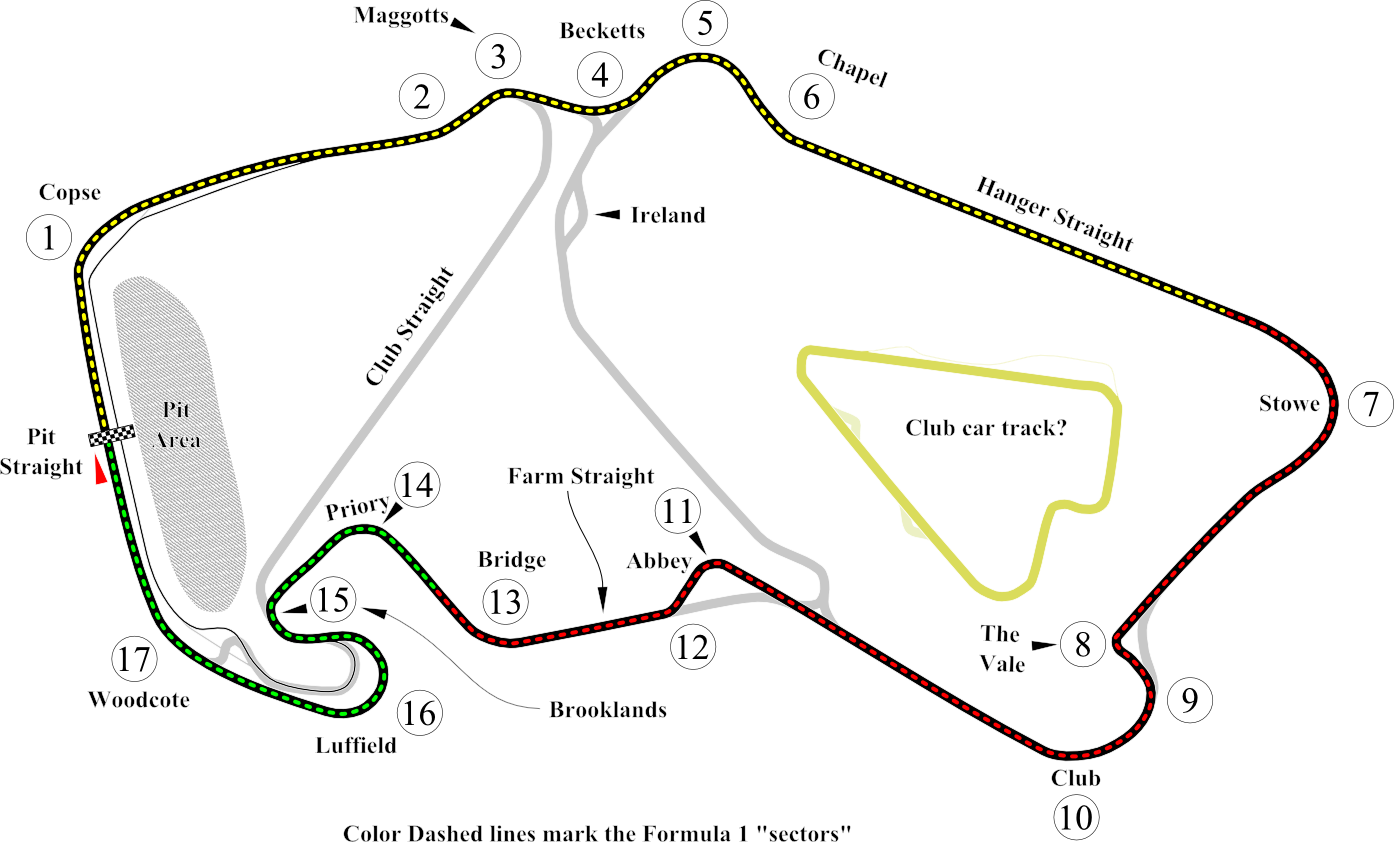
- Silverstone Circuit
- Location: Silverstone Circuit, Northamptonshire, England
- Course: Permanent racing facility 5.141 km (3.194 mi)

GP2 Series

Feature race
- Date: 20 June 2009
- Laps: 36

Pole position
Driver	(France) Romain Grosjean	Barwa Addax Team
- Time: 1:25.899

Podium
First	(Brazil) Alberto Valerio	Piquet GP
Second	(Brazil) Lucas di Grassi	F. B. Racing Engineering
Third	(Germany) Nico Hülkenberg	ART Grand Prix

Fastest lap
Driver	(Germany) Nico Hülkenberg	ART Grand Prix
- Time: 1:29.914 (on lap 16)

Sprint race
- Date: 21 June 2009
- Laps: 23

Podium
First	(Venezuela) Pastor Maldonado	ART Grand Prix
Second	(United Arab Emirates) Andreas Zuber	Fisichella Motor Sport
Third	(India) Karun Chandhok	O. Racing Technology

Fastest lap
Driver	(Brazil) Lucas di Grassi	F. B. Racing Engineering
- Time: 1:29.069 (on lap 7)

The 2009 British GP2 round was the fourth round of the 2009 GP2 Series season. It was held on 20 and 21 June 2009 at Silverstone Circuit at Silverstone, United Kingdom. The race was used as a support race to the 2009 British Grand Prix.

Past Winners include 2008 champion Giorgio Pantano and runner up, Bruno Senna, who both did not compete this year. 2008 Formula One World Champion Lewis Hamilton also won in 2006.

Romain Grosjean started from Pole in the feature race, with Alberto Valerio taking a surprise second in his Piquet GP car. Both drivers got off the line well, but within five laps Valerio passed Grosjean for the lead. Grosjean continued to fall back and finished in fifth place.

Pastor Maldonado of ART Grand Prix won the sprint race from the front row, he beat Andreas Zuber off the line, and the two of them did not change their positions at the chequered flag, after a late safety car period.

== Standings after the round ==
Drivers' Championship standings

Pos	Driver	Points
1	(France) Romain Grosjean	40
2	(Russia) Vitaly Petrov	33
3	(Venezuela) Pastor Maldonado	26
4	(Germany) Nico Hülkenberg	26
5	(Brazil) Lucas di Grassi	24

Teams' Championship standings

Pos	Team	Points
1	(Spain) Barwa Addax Team	73
2	(France) ART Grand Prix	52
3	(Spain) Fat Burner Racing Engineering	24
4	(France) DAMS	21
5	(United Kingdom) Super Nova Racing	20

- Note: Only the top five positions are included for both sets of standings.

Previous round: 2009 Turkish GP2 round	GP2 Series; 2009 season	Next round: 2009 German GP2 round
Previous round: 2008 Silverstone GP2 Series round	Silverstone GP2 round	Next round: 2010 Silverstone GP2 Series round
