= 2009 GP2 Series =

Season of Formula One feeder championship

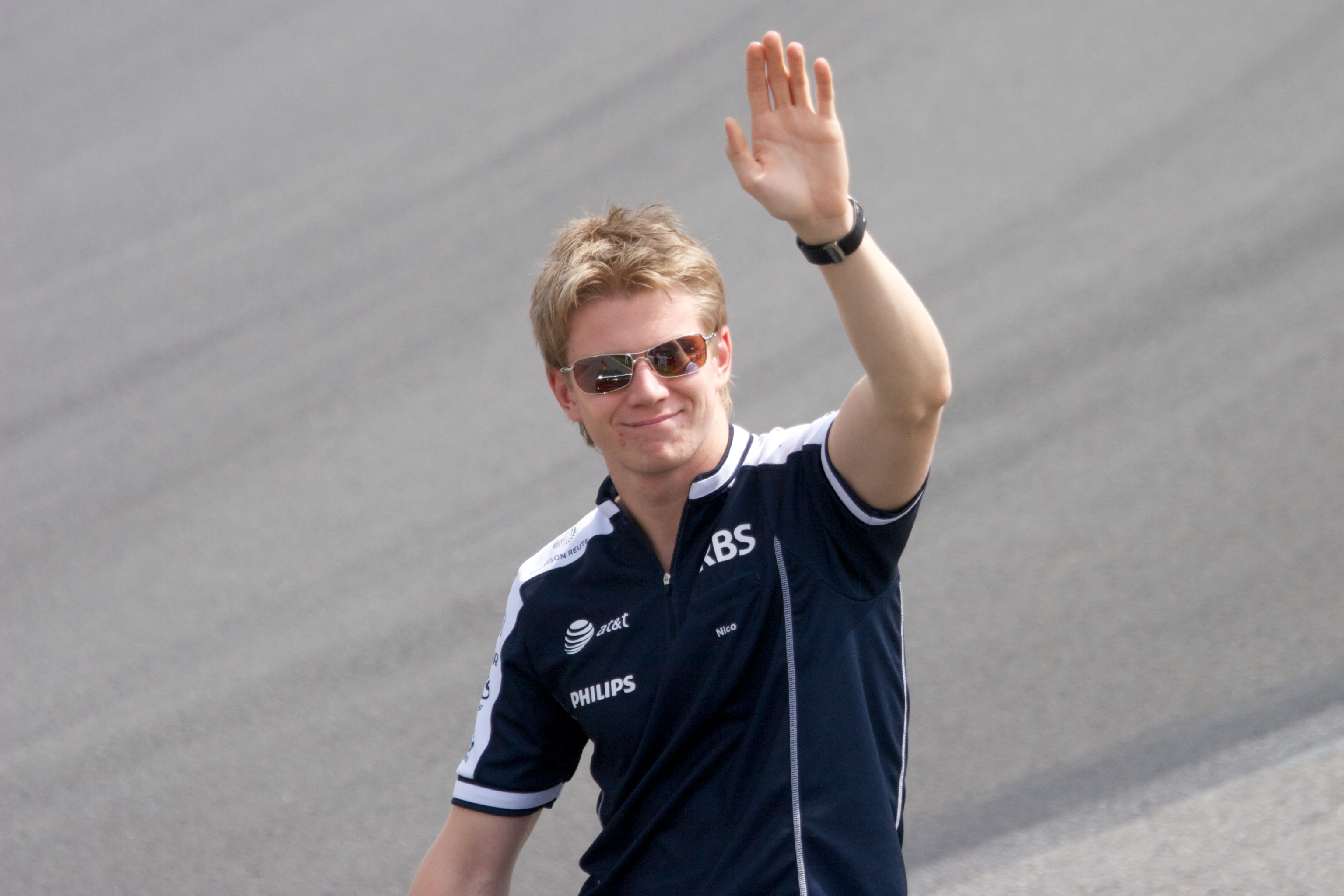
Nico Hülkenberg (pictured in 2010), won the championship by a margin of 25 points over Vitaly Petrov. His team ART Grand Prix also wrapped up the teams' title, holding off Barwa Addax by 14 points.

The 2009 GP2 Series season was the forty-third season of the second-tier of Formula One feeder championship and also fifth season under the GP2 Series moniker. The season consisted of twenty races at ten rounds, beginning on 9 May at the Circuit de Catalunya and finishing on 20 September at the Autódromo Internacional do Algarve. The Algarve circuit hosted its first GP2 weekend, and was the only new circuit on the calendar. The Nürburgring also returned as part of its rotation with Hockenheim as the home of the German Grand Prix.

The title was won by German rookie Nico Hülkenberg at the penultimate round of the championship at Monza, the first time the series had been won before the final round. His team ART Grand Prix claimed the teams title in the Algarve.

Barwa Addax's title contender Romain Grosjean left the series mid-season to join the Renault for the remainder of the Formula One season following Nelson Piquet Jr.'s sacking.

Champion Hülkenberg, runner-up Petrov and 3rd place Lucas di Grassi all drove in the 2010 Formula One season for Williams, Renault and new team Virgin Racing respectively. 16th place Kamui Kobayashi took part in the final two races of the 2009 Formula One season for Toyota following Timo Glock's injury in the Japanese Grand Prix while 18th place Karun Chandhok joined new Formula One team HRT in 2010.

== Teams and drivers ==
All of the teams used the Dallara GP2/08 chassis with Renault-badged 4.0 litre (244 cu in) naturally-aspirated Mecachrome V8 engines order and with tyres supplied by Bridgestone.

Team	No.	Driver name	Rounds
(Spain) Barwa Campos Team (1) (Spain) Barwa Addax Team (2–10)	1	(Russia) Vitaly Petrov	All
(Spain) Barwa Campos Team (1) (Spain) Barwa Addax Team (2–10)	2	(France) Romain Grosjean	1–6
(Spain) Barwa Campos Team (1) (Spain) Barwa Addax Team (2–10)	2	(Italy) Davide Valsecchi	7–10
(United Kingdom) iSport International	3	(Netherlands) Giedo van der Garde	All
(United Kingdom) iSport International	4	(Brazil) Diego Nunes	All
(Brazil) Piquet GP	5	(Spain) Roldán Rodríguez	All
(Brazil) Piquet GP	6	(Brazil) Alberto Valerio	All
(Spain) Fat Burner Racing Engineering	7	(Brazil) Lucas di Grassi	All
(Spain) Fat Burner Racing Engineering	8	(Spain) Dani Clos	All
(France) ART Grand Prix	9	(Venezuela) Pastor Maldonado	All
(France) ART Grand Prix	10	(Germany) Nico Hülkenberg	All
(Netherlands) Telmex Arden International (Note: Arden International competed under a Dutch licence.)	11	(Mexico) Sergio Pérez	All
(Netherlands) Telmex Arden International	12	(Italy) Edoardo Mortara	All
(United Kingdom) Super Nova Racing	14	(Italy) Luca Filippi	All
(United Kingdom) Super Nova Racing	15	(Spain) Javier Villa	All
(France) DAMS	16	(Belgium) Jérôme d'Ambrosio	All
(France) DAMS	17	(Japan) Kamui Kobayashi	All
(Italy) Trident Racing	18	(Portugal) Ricardo Teixeira	All
(Italy) Trident Racing	19	(Italy) Davide Rigon	1–4, 6–10
(Italy) Trident Racing	19	(Venezuela) Rodolfo González	5
(Italy) FMSI (1–6) (Italy) Party Poker Racing.com SC (7–10)	20	(United Arab Emirates) Andreas Zuber (Note: Zuber is an Austrian driver who competed under an Emirati racing licence.)	1–7, 9–10
(Italy) FMSI (1–6) (Italy) Party Poker Racing.com SC (7–10)	21	(Brazil) Luiz Razia	1–7, 9–10
(Italy) Durango	22	(Italy) Davide Valsecchi	1–6
(Italy) Durango	22	(Monaco) Stefano Coletti	7–8
(Italy) Durango	23	(France) Nelson Panciatici	1–8
(Portugal) Ocean Racing Technology	24	(India) Karun Chandhok	All
(Portugal) Ocean Racing Technology	25	(Portugal) Álvaro Parente	All
(United Kingdom) DPR	26	(Romania) Michael Herck	All
(United Kingdom) DPR	27	(Italy) Giacomo Ricci	1–4
(United Kingdom) DPR	27	(France) Franck Perera	5–8
(United Kingdom) DPR	27	(Venezuela) Johnny Cecotto Jr.	9–10

=== Team changes ===
- BCN Competición was bought by Tiago Monteiro, who moved the team to Portugal and renamed it Ocean Racing Technology.
- Campos Grand Prix became Barwa Addax after it was bought by Alejandro Agag.

Midseason changes

- Fisichella Motor Sport became PartyPokerRacing.com Scuderia Coloni prior to round seven in Valencia. They were then forced to miss round eight at Spa due to unresolved financial disputes.
- Durango missed round nine at Monza as Stefano Coletti destroyed one of the team's chassis in a crash at Spa. Coletti himself was unfit to drive the original chassis that was formerly driven by Nelson Panciatici. They also missed the final round at the Autódromo Internacional do Algarve due to not finding "suitably qualified drivers".

=== Driver changes ===
Changed Team

- Karun Chandhok: iSport International → Ocean Racing Technology
- Lucas di Grassi: Campos Grand Prix → Fat Burner Racing Engineering
- Luca Filippi: Trust Team Arden → Super Nova Racing
- Romain Grosjean: ART Grand Prix → Barwa Addax Team
- Pastor Maldonado: Minardi Piquet Sports → ART Grand Prix
- Diego Nunes: David Price Racing → iSport International
- Álvaro Parente: Super Nova Racing → Ocean Racing Technology
- Roldán Rodríguez: Fisichella Motor Sport → Piquet GP
- Alberto Valerio: Durango → Piquet GP
- Davide Valsecchi: Durango → Barwa Addax
- Javier Villa : Racing Engineering → Super Nova Racing
- Andreas Zuber: Minardi Piquet Sports → Fisichella Motor Sport/PartyPokerRacing.com Scuderia Coloni

Entering/Re-Entering GP2

- Johnny Cecotto Jr.: Formula 3 Euro Series (HBR Motorsport) → David Price Racing
- Dani Clos: Formula 3 Euro Series (Prema Powerteam) → Fat Burner Racing Engineering
- Stefano Coletti: Formula 3 Euro Series (Prema Powerteam) → Durango
- Giedo van der Garde: World Series by Renault (P1 Motorsport) → iSport International
- Rodolfo González: Formula 3 Euro Series (Carlin Motorsport) → Trident Racing
- Nico Hülkenberg: Formula 3 Euro Series (ART Grand Prix) → ART Grand Prix
- Edoardo Mortara: Formula 3 Euro Series (Signature-Plus) → Telmex Arden International
- Nelson Panciatici: Spanish Formula Three Championship (Hache International) → Durango
- Franck Perera: Superleague Formula (A.S. Roma) → David Price Racing
- Sergio Pérez: British Formula 3 Championship (T-Sport) → Telmex Arden International
- Luiz Razia: Euroseries 3000 (ELK Motorsport) → Fisichella Motor Sport/PartyPokerRacing.com Scuderia Coloni
- Davide Rigon: Superleague Formula (Beijing Guoan) → Trident Racing
- Ricardo Teixeira: British Formula 3 Championship (Ultimate Motorsport) → Trident Racing

Leaving GP2

- Marko Asmer: Fisichella Motor Sport → Superleague Formula testing
- Christian Bakkerud: Super Nova Racing → Deutsche Tourenwagen Masters (Futurecom-TME)
- Sébastien Buemi: Trust Team Arden → Formula One (Scuderia Toro Rosso)
- Mike Conway: Trident Racing → IndyCar Series (Dreyer & Reinbold Racing)
- Romain Grosjean: Barwa Addax → Formula One (ING Renault F1 Team)
- Carlos Iaconelli: BCN Competición → FIA Formula Two Championship
- Giorgio Pantano: Racing Engineering → Eurocup Renault Mégane V6 Trophy & Superleague Formula (A.C. Milan)
- Miloš Pavlović: BCN Competición → FIA Formula Two Championship
- Bruno Senna: iSport International → Le Mans Series (Team Oreca Matmut AIM)
- Andy Soucek: Super Nova Racing → FIA Formula Two Championship
- Ho-Pin Tung: Trident Racing → A1 Grand Prix (A1 Team China) & Superleague Formula (Atlético Madrid)
- Adrián Vallés: BCN Competición → World Series by Renault (Epsilon Euskadi) & Superleague Formula (Liverpool F.C.)

Midseason changes

- Giacomo Ricci was replaced at DPR by Franck Perera after round four. Perera parted company with DPR prior to round nine to return to A.S. Roma in Superleague Formula. Perera was in turn replaced by Venezuelan driver Johnny Cecotto Jr. for the final two rounds.
- Davide Rigon missed round five due to sponsorship problems. Rodolfo González filled in for him at Trident Racing.
- Davide Valsecchi parted company with Durango ahead of round seven and switched to Barwa Addax to replace Formula One-bound Romain Grosjean. Stefano Coletti was the driver to replace Valsecchi at Durango.

== 2009 schedule ==
The 2009 calendar was announced on 16 December 2008. The final round of the championship was the first GP2 race to take place at the Autódromo Internacional do Algarve. Also, the German Grand Prix was moved from Hockenheim to the Nürburgring.

Round		Location	Circuit	Date	Time		Tyres (Note: Bridgestone supplied only one dry compound to the teams to be used throughout the race weekend.)	Supporting
Round		Location	Circuit	Date	Local	UTC	Tyres	Supporting
1	F	Montmeló, Spain	Circuit de Catalunya	9 May	16:00	14:00	Medium	2009 Spanish Grand Prix
1	S	Montmeló, Spain	Circuit de Catalunya	10 May	10:30	08:30	Medium	2009 Spanish Grand Prix
2	F	Monte Carlo, Monaco	Circuit de Monaco	22 May	11:15	09:15	Super Soft	2009 Monaco Grand Prix
2	S	Monte Carlo, Monaco	Circuit de Monaco	23 May	16:00	14:00	Super Soft	2009 Monaco Grand Prix
3	F	Istanbul, Turkey	Istanbul Park	6 June	16:00	13:00	Medium	2009 Turkish Grand Prix
3	S	Istanbul, Turkey	Istanbul Park	7 June	11:30	08:30	Medium	2009 Turkish Grand Prix
4	F	(United Kingdom) Silverstone, Great Britain	Silverstone Circuit	20 June	15:00	14:00	Medium	2009 British Grand Prix
4	S	(United Kingdom) Silverstone, Great Britain	Silverstone Circuit	21 June	09:30	08:30	Medium	2009 British Grand Prix
5	F	Nürburg, Germany	Nürburgring	11 July	16:00	14:00	Soft	2009 German Grand Prix
5	S	Nürburg, Germany	Nürburgring	12 July	10:30	08:30	Soft	2009 German Grand Prix
6	F	Mogyoród, Hungary	Hungaroring	25 July	16:00	14:00	Soft	2009 Hungarian Grand Prix
6	S	Mogyoród, Hungary	Hungaroring	26 July	10:30	08:30	Soft	2009 Hungarian Grand Prix
7	F	Valencia, Spain	Valencia Street Circuit	22 August	16:00	14:00	Soft	2009 European Grand Prix
7	S	Valencia, Spain	Valencia Street Circuit	23 August	10:30	08:30	Soft	2009 European Grand Prix
8	F	Stavelot, Belgium	Circuit de Spa-Francorchamps	29 August	16:00	14:00	Soft	2009 Belgian Grand Prix
8	S	Stavelot, Belgium	Circuit de Spa-Francorchamps	30 August	10:30	08:30	Soft	2009 Belgian Grand Prix
9	F	Monza, Italy	Autodromo Nazionale Monza	12 September	16:00	14:00	Medium	2009 Italian Grand Prix
9	S	Monza, Italy	Autodromo Nazionale Monza	13 September	10:30	08:30	Medium	2009 Italian Grand Prix
10	F	Portimão, Portugal	Autódromo Internacional do Algarve	19 September	14:00	13:00	Soft	2009 FIA GT Algarve 2 Hours
10	S	Portimão, Portugal	Autódromo Internacional do Algarve	20 September	12:45	11:45	Soft	2009 FIA GT Algarve 2 Hours

== Results ==
Round		Circuit	Pole position	Fastest lap	Winning driver	Winning team	Report
1	F	(Spain) Circuit de Catalunya	(France) Romain Grosjean	(France) Romain Grosjean	(France) Romain Grosjean	(Spain) Barwa Campos Team	Report
1	S	(Spain) Circuit de Catalunya		(Spain) Dani Clos (Note: Dani Clos set the fastest lap, but did not finish in the top 10, so was ineligible to be the point-scorer for the fastest lap. Edoardo Mortara was the point-scorer instead for setting the fastest lap of those finishing in the top 10.)	(Italy) Edoardo Mortara	(Netherlands) Telmex Arden International	Report
2	F	Circuit de Monaco	(France) Romain Grosjean	(France) Romain Grosjean	(France) Romain Grosjean	(Spain) Barwa Addax Team	Report
2	S	Circuit de Monaco		(Russia) Vitaly Petrov	(Venezuela) Pastor Maldonado	(France) ART Grand Prix	Report
3	F	(Turkey) Istanbul Park	(Germany) Nico Hülkenberg	(India) Karun Chandhok (Note: Karun Chandhok set the fastest lap, but did not finish in the top 10, so was ineligible to be the point-scorer for the fastest lap. Vitaly Petrov was the point-scorer instead for setting the fastest lap of those finishing in the top 10.)	(Russia) Vitaly Petrov	(Spain) Barwa Addax Team	Report
3	S	(Turkey) Istanbul Park		(Brazil) Lucas di Grassi	(Brazil) Lucas di Grassi	(Spain) Fat Burner Racing Engineering	Report
4	F	(United Kingdom) Silverstone Circuit	(France) Romain Grosjean	(Germany) Nico Hülkenberg	(Brazil) Alberto Valerio	(Brazil) Piquet GP	Report
4	S	(United Kingdom) Silverstone Circuit		(Brazil) Lucas di Grassi (Note: Lucas di Grassi set the fastest lap, but did not finish in the top 10, so was ineligible to be the point-scorer for the fastest lap. Pastor Maldonado was the point-scorer instead for setting the fastest lap of those finishing in the top 10.)	(Venezuela) Pastor Maldonado	(France) ART Grand Prix	Report
5	F	(Germany) Nürburgring	(Germany) Nico Hülkenberg	(Italy) Edoardo Mortara (Note: Edoardo Mortara set the fastest lap, but did not finish in the top 10, so was ineligible to be the point-scorer for the fastest lap. Nico Hülkenberg was the point-scorer instead for setting the fastest lap of those finishing in the top 10.)	(Germany) Nico Hülkenberg	(France) ART Grand Prix	Report
5	S	(Germany) Nürburgring		(Brazil) Alberto Valerio (Note: Alberto Valerio set the fastest lap, but did not finish in the top 10, so was ineligible to be the point-scorer for the fastest lap. Nico Hülkenberg was the point-scorer instead for setting the fastest lap of those finishing in the top 10.)	(Germany) Nico Hülkenberg	(France) ART Grand Prix	Report
6	F	(Hungary) Hungaroring	(Brazil) Lucas di Grassi	(Germany) Nico Hülkenberg	(Germany) Nico Hülkenberg	(France) ART Grand Prix	Report
6	S	(Hungary) Hungaroring		(Italy) Luca Filippi	(Netherlands) Giedo van der Garde	(United Kingdom) iSport International	Report
7	F	(Spain) Valencia Street Circuit	(Germany) Nico Hülkenberg	(Germany) Nico Hülkenberg	(Russia) Vitaly Petrov	(Spain) Barwa Addax Team	Report
7	S	(Spain) Valencia Street Circuit		(Germany) Nico Hülkenberg	(Germany) Nico Hülkenberg	(France) ART Grand Prix	Report
8	F	(Belgium) Circuit de Spa-Francorchamps	(Portugal) Álvaro Parente	(Portugal) Álvaro Parente	(Portugal) Álvaro Parente	(Portugal) Ocean Racing Technology	Report
8	S	(Belgium) Circuit de Spa-Francorchamps		(Mexico) Sergio Pérez	(Netherlands) Giedo van der Garde	(United Kingdom) iSport International	Report
9	F	(Italy) Autodromo Nazionale Monza	(Russia) Vitaly Petrov	(Italy) Edoardo Mortara	(Netherlands) Giedo van der Garde	(United Kingdom) iSport International	Report
9	S	(Italy) Autodromo Nazionale Monza		(Italy) Luca Filippi (Note: Luca Filippi set the fastest lap, but did not finish in the top 10, so was ineligible to be the point-scorer for the fastest lap. Luiz Razia was the point-scorer instead for setting the fastest lap of those finishing in the top 10.)	(Brazil) Luiz Razia	(Italy) Party Poker Racing.com SC	Report
10	F	(Portugal) Autódromo Internacional do Algarve	(Russia) Vitaly Petrov	(Brazil) Diego Nunes (Note: Diego Nunes set the fastest lap, but did not finish in the top 10, so was ineligible to be the point-scorer for the fastest lap. Luca Filippi was the point-scorer instead for setting the fastest lap of those finishing in the top 10.)	(Germany) Nico Hülkenberg	(France) ART Grand Prix	Report
10	S	(Portugal) Autódromo Internacional do Algarve		(Germany) Nico Hülkenberg (Note: Nico Hülkenberg set the fastest lap, but did not finish in the top 10, so was ineligible to be the point-scorer for the fastest lap. Luca Filippi was the point-scorer instead for setting the fastest lap of those finishing in the top 10.)	(Italy) Luca Filippi	(United Kingdom) Super Nova Racing	Report

== Championship standings ==
Scoring system

Points are awarded to the top 8 classified finishers in the Feature race, and to the top 6 classified finishers in the Sprint race. The pole-sitter in the feature race will also receive two points, and one point is given to the driver who set the fastest lap inside the top ten in both the feature and sprint races. No extra points are awarded to the pole-sitter in the sprint race.

Feature race points

Position	**1st**	**2nd**	**3rd**	**4th**	**5th**	**6th**	**7th**	**8th**	**Pole**	**FL**
Points	10	8	6	5	4	3	2	1	2	1

Sprint race points

Points are awarded to the top 6 classified finishers.

Position	**1st**	**2nd**	**3rd**	**4th**	**5th**	**6th**	**FL**
Points	6	5	4	3	2	1	1

=== Drivers' Championship ===
Pos	Driver	CAT (Spain)		MON (Monaco)		IST (Turkey)		SIL (United Kingdom)		NÜR (Germany)		HUN (Hungary)		VAL (Spain)		SPA (Belgium)		MNZ (Italy)		ALG (Portugal)		Points
1	(Germany) Nico Hülkenberg	9	14	5	3	**5**	4	3	5	**1**	1	1	7	**2**	1	2	Ret	6	3	1	16	100
2	(Russia) Vitaly Petrov	2	9	2	6	1	3	15	10	4	4	Ret	12	1	3	Ret	6	**2**	5	**4**	Ret	75
3	(Brazil) Lucas di Grassi	Ret	10	4	4	8	1	2	19	7	Ret	**2**	3	19†	Ret	3	Ret	3	2	3	15	63
4	(France) Romain Grosjean	**1**	2	**1**	17†	Ret	12	**5**	4	18†	5	10	4									45
5	(Italy) Luca Filippi	4	7	Ret	NC	2	Ret	14	16	Ret	18†	6	2	7	Ret	Ret	Ret	Ret	Ret	2	1	40
6	(Venezuela) Pastor Maldonado	5	6	8	1	6	5	7	1	Ret	9	4	Ret	DSQ	8	4	Ret	Ret	15†	11	20	36
7	(Netherlands) Giedo van der Garde	7	4	NC	11	15	13	Ret	13	12	Ret	7	1	14	Ret	6	1	1	6	Ret	6	34
8	(Portugal) Álvaro Parente	Ret	11	Ret	Ret	Ret	10	Ret	11	6	2	9	6	4	Ret	**1**	Ret	11	Ret	Ret	4	30
9	(Belgium) Jérôme d'Ambrosio	3	3	6	2	Ret	15	19	12	10	7	16	Ret	9	4	Ret	Ret	4	4	Ret	10	29
10	(Spain) Javier Villa	10	Ret	10	8	7	2	Ret	15	5	6	3	5	18†	9	13	10	7	10	13	2	27
11	(Spain) Roldán Rodríguez	Ret	Ret	11	Ret	Ret	17	12	9	2	Ret	Ret	13	5	Ret	5	2	13	7	5	Ret	25
12	(Mexico) Sergio Pérez	14	17	12	9	Ret	16	4	6	8	20†	Ret	16	3	2	Ret	4	Ret	Ret	Ret	11	22
13	(United Arab Emirates) Andreas Zuber	Ret	Ret	3	5	9	19	8	2	3	Ret	Ret	17	16	Ret			12	Ret	8	12	21
14	(Italy) Edoardo Mortara	6	1	Ret	13	Ret	9	Ret	Ret	17	Ret	12	14	6	12	8	Ret	5	Ret	Ret	8	19
15	(Brazil) Alberto Valerio	15	13	Ret	Ret	4	6	1	7	Ret	17	Ret	21†	17	10	Ret	12	Ret	11	Ret	7	16
16	(Japan) Kamui Kobayashi	8	5	Ret	12	Ret	NC	Ret	17	9	3	13	8	8	11	7	11	17	17†	6	19	13
17	(Italy) Davide Valsecchi	Ret	16	15†	18	3	Ret	10	14	13	10	5	9	10	Ret	Ret	8	14	9	7	14	12
18	(India) Karun Chandhok	Ret	NC	7	Ret	13	14	6	3	11	Ret	17†	10	Ret	6	Ret	7	19†	12	Ret	13	10
19	(Brazil) Luiz Razia	16	12	13	10	Ret	20	20†	Ret	Ret	14	Ret	Ret	Ret	13			8	1	10	17	8
20	(Brazil) Diego Nunes	11	8	Ret	14	11	11	11	Ret	Ret	11	Ret	15	11	5	9	3	10	Ret	12	5	8
21	(Spain) Dani Clos	Ret	19	Ret	Ret	12	7	13	Ret	16	8	11	11	Ret	Ret	10	Ret	15	Ret	9	3	4
22	(Italy) Davide Rigon	17	21†	9	7	10	8	16	20			8	Ret	12	7	Ret	5	9	8	14	9	3
23	(Romania) Michael Herck	13	Ret	16	16	Ret	Ret	9	8	14	12	15	DNS	13	Ret	Ret	9	20†	13	DSQ	Ret	0
24	(France) Nelson Panciatici	12	18	Ret	15	Ret	Ret	18	Ret	19†	13	14	20	Ret	15	11	13					0
25	(Monaco) Stefano Coletti													Ret	Ret	12†	DNS					0
26	(Portugal) Ricardo Teixeira	Ret	20	DNQ	DNQ	14	18	Ret	18	Ret	15	Ret	19	Ret	14	Ret	14	16	14	15	21	0
27	(Italy) Giacomo Ricci	Ret	15	14	Ret	Ret	Ret	17	DNS													0
28	(France) Franck Perera									Ret	16	EX	18	15	16†	DNQ	DNQ					0
29	(Venezuela) Rodolfo González									15	19											0
30	(Venezuela) Johnny Cecotto Jr.																	18†	16†	DNS	18	0
Pos	Driver	CAT (Spain)		MON (Monaco)		IST (Turkey)		SIL (United Kingdom)		NÜR (Germany)		HUN (Hungary)		VAL (Spain)		SPA (Belgium)		MNZ (Italy)		ALG (Portugal)		Points

Key
Colour	Result
Gold	Winner
Silver	2nd place
Bronze	3rd place
Green	Other points position
Blue	Other classified position
Blue	Not classified, finished (NC)
Purple	Not classified, retired (Ret)
Red	Did not qualify (DNQ)
Red	Did not pre-qualify (DNPQ)
Black	Disqualified (DSQ)
White	Did not start (DNS)
White	Race cancelled (C)
Blank	Did not practice (DNP)
Blank	Excluded (EX)
Blank	Did not arrive (DNA)
Blank	Withdrawn (WD)
Text formatting	Meaning
**Bold**	Pole position point(s)
Italics	Fastest lap point(s)

Notes:

- † — Drivers did not finish the race, but were classified as they completed over 90% of the race distance.

=== Teams' Championship ===
Pos	Team	Car No.	CAT (Spain)		MON (Monaco)		IST (Turkey)		SIL (United Kingdom)		NÜR (Germany)		HUN (Hungary)		VAL (Spain)		SPA (Belgium)		MNZ (Italy)		ALG (Portugal)		Points
1	(France) ART Grand Prix	9	5	6	8	1	6	5	7	1	Ret	9	4	Ret	DSQ	8	4	Ret	Ret	15†	11	20	136
1	(France) ART Grand Prix	10	9	14	5	3	**5**	4	3	5	**1**	1	1	7	**2**	1	2	Ret	6	3	1	16	136
2	(Spain) Barwa Campos Team (1) (Spain) Barwa Addax Team (2–10)	1	2	9	2	6	1	3	15	10	4	4	Ret	12	1	3	Ret	6	**2**	5	**4**	Ret	122
2	(Spain) Barwa Campos Team (1) (Spain) Barwa Addax Team (2–10)	2	**1**	2	**1**	17†	Ret	12	**5**	4	18†	5	10	4	10	Ret	Ret	8	14	9	7	14	122
3	(United Kingdom) Super Nova Racing	14	4	7	Ret	NC	2	Ret	14	16	Ret	18†	6	2	7	Ret	Ret	Ret	Ret	Ret	2	1	67
3	(United Kingdom) Super Nova Racing	15	10	Ret	10	8	7	2	Ret	15	5	6	3	5	18†	9	13	10	7	10	13	2	67
4	(Spain) Fat Burner Racing Engineering	7	Ret	10	4	4	8	1	2	19	7	Ret	**2**	3	19†	Ret	3	Ret	3	2	3	15	67
4	(Spain) Fat Burner Racing Engineering	8	Ret	19	Ret	Ret	12	7	13	Ret	16	8	11	11	Ret	Ret	10	Ret	15	Ret	9	3	67
5	(United Kingdom) iSport International	3	7	4	NC	11	15	13	Ret	13	12	Ret	7	1	14	Ret	6	1	1	6	Ret	6	42
5	(United Kingdom) iSport International	4	11	8	Ret	14	11	11	11	Ret	Ret	11	Ret	15	11	5	9	3	10	Ret	12	5	42
6	(France) DAMS	16	3	3	6	2	Ret	15	19	12	10	7	16	Ret	9	4	Ret	Ret	4	4	Ret	10	42
6	(France) DAMS	17	8	5	Ret	12	Ret	NC	Ret	17	9	3	13	8	8	11	7	11	17	17†	6	19	42
7	(Brazil) Piquet GP	5	Ret	Ret	11	Ret	Ret	17	12	9	2	Ret	Ret	13	5	Ret	5	2	13	7	5	Ret	41
7	(Brazil) Piquet GP	6	15	13	Ret	Ret	4	6	1	7	Ret	17	Ret	21†	17	10	Ret	12	Ret	11	Ret	7	41
8	(Netherlands) Telmex Arden International	11	14	17	12	9	Ret	9	4	6	8	20†	Ret	16	3	2	Ret	4	Ret	Ret	Ret	11	41
8	(Netherlands) Telmex Arden International	12	6	1	Ret	13	Ret	16	Ret	Ret	17	Ret	12	14	6	12	8	Ret	5	Ret	Ret	8	41
9	(Portugal) Ocean Racing Technology	24	Ret	NC	7	Ret	13	14	6	3	11	Ret	17†	10	Ret	6	Ret	7	19†	12	Ret	13	40
9	(Portugal) Ocean Racing Technology	25	Ret	11	Ret	Ret	Ret	10	Ret	11	6	2	9	6	4	Ret	**1**	Ret	11	Ret	Ret	4	40
10	(Italy) FMSI (1–6) (Italy) Party Poker Racing.com SC (7–10)	20	Ret	Ret	3	5	9	19	8	2	3	Ret	Ret	17	16	Ret			12	Ret	8	12	29
10	(Italy) FMSI (1–6) (Italy) Party Poker Racing.com SC (7–10)	21	16	12	13	10	Ret	20	20†	Ret	Ret	14	Ret	Ret	Ret	13			8	1	10	17	29
11	(Italy) Durango	22	Ret	16	15†	18	3	Ret	10	14	13	10	5	9	Ret	Ret	12†	DNS					10
11	(Italy) Durango	23	12	18	Ret	15	Ret	Ret	18	Ret	19†	13	14	20	Ret	15	11	13					10
12	(Italy) Trident Racing	18	Ret	20	DNQ	DNQ	14	18	Ret	18	Ret	15	Ret	19	Ret	14	Ret	14	16	14	15	21	3
12	(Italy) Trident Racing	19	17	21†	9	7	10	8	16	20	15	19	8	Ret	13	7	Ret	5	9	8	14	9	3
13	(United Kingdom) DPR	26	13	Ret	16	16	Ret	Ret	9	8	14	12	15	DNS	13	Ret	Ret	9	20†	13	DSQ	Ret	0
13	(United Kingdom) DPR	27	Ret	15	14	Ret	Ret	Ret	17	DNS	Ret	16	EX	18	15	16†	DNQ	DNQ	18†	16†	DNS	18	0
Pos	Team	Car No.	CAT (Spain)		MON (Monaco)		IST (Turkey)		SIL (United Kingdom)		NÜR (Germany)		HUN (Hungary)		VAL (Spain)		SPA (Belgium)		MNZ (Italy)		ALG (Portugal)		Points

Key
Colour	Result
Gold	Winner
Silver	2nd place
Bronze	3rd place
Green	Other points position
Blue	Other classified position
Blue	Not classified, finished (NC)
Purple	Not classified, retired (Ret)
Red	Did not qualify (DNQ)
Red	Did not pre-qualify (DNPQ)
Black	Disqualified (DSQ)
White	Did not start (DNS)
White	Race cancelled (C)
Blank	Did not practice (DNP)
Blank	Excluded (EX)
Blank	Did not arrive (DNA)
Blank	Withdrawn (WD)
Text formatting	Meaning
**Bold**	Pole position point(s)
Italics	Fastest lap point(s)

Notes:

- † — Drivers did not finish the race, but were classified as they completed over 90% of the race distance.
