= 2009 Monza GP2 Series round =

Motor racing competition

(Italy) 2009 Italian GP2 round
Round details
- Round 9 of 10 rounds in the 2009 GP2 Series
- Circuit de Monza
- Location: Circuit Monza; Monza, Italy
- Course: Permanent racing facility 5.793 km (3.6 mi)

GP2 Series

Feature race
- Date: 12 September 2009
- Laps: 32

Pole position
Driver	(Russia) Vitaly Petrov	Barwa Addax Team
- Time: 1:30.007

Podium
First	(Netherlands) Giedo van der Garde	iSport International
Second	(Russia) Vitaly Petrov	Barwa Addax Team
Third	(Brazil) Lucas di Grassi	F. B. Racing Engineering

Fastest lap
Driver	(Italy) Edoardo Mortara	Arden International
- Time: 1:43.283 (on lap 28)

Sprint race
- Date: 13 September 2009
- Laps: 21

Podium
First	(Brazil) Luiz Razia	Scuderia Coloni
Second	(Brazil) Lucas di Grassi	F. B. Racing Engineering
Third	(Germany) Nico Hülkenberg	ART Grand Prix

Fastest lap
Driver	(Brazil) Luiz Razia (Note: Luca Filippi set the fastest lap, but did not finish in the top 10, so was ineligible to be the point-scorer for the fastest lap. Luiz Razia was the point-scorer instead for setting the fastest lap of those finishing in the top 10.)	Scuderia Coloni
- Time: 1:32.553 (on lap 10)

The 2009 Italian GP2 Round was the ninth and penultimate round of the 2009 GP2 Series season. It was held on September 12 and 13, 2009 at Circuit Monza at Monza, Italy. The race was used as a support race to the 2009 Italian Grand Prix.

== Report ==
=== Background ===
The race also saw the return of PartyPokerRacing.com Scuderia Coloni after their court order was dropped. However, Durango withdrew from the event, meaning there were only 12 teams present at Monza, just like at the previous round at Spa. Johnny Cecotto Jr. made his debut for DPR.

=== Qualifying ===
Vitaly Petrov achieved the first pole position in his GP2 Series career. Both Racing Engineering drivers were given 10 place grid penalties after causing avoidable accidents in Spa.

=== Feature Race ===
The Feature Race was action packed, with a very wet track and terrible conditions, the race started behind the safety car. Giedo van der Garde got his and iSport International their first feature win of the season. He passed long time leader Vitaly Petrov for the lead two laps from the end.

=== Sprint Race ===
The Sprint Race was less thrilling, but crashes were still common, as on the first lap Dani Clos flipped his car after being hit side on. Luiz Razia won his first ever GP2 Race and PartyPokerRacing.com Scuderia Coloni's first win in only their second round. The Round was lucky for Razia as Álvaro Parente was penalised after the race, putting him down to eleventh and moving Razia up to 8th, to claim his first GP2 points finish and first pole. After starting from a lucky pole, Razia never looked challenged and finished ahead of the good starting Lucas di Grassi and new champion Nico Hülkenberg. Hülkenberg became 2009 GP2 Series season champion after Vitaly Petrov did not score enough points to keep his championship challenge alive.

- .

== Standings after the round ==
Drivers' Championship standings

Pos	Driver	Points
1	(Germany) Nico Hülkenberg	90
2	(Russia) Vitaly Petrov	68
3	(Brazil) Lucas di Grassi	57
4	(France) Romain Grosjean	45
5	(Venezuela) Pastor Maldonado	36

Teams' Championship standings

Pos	Team	Points
1	(France) ART Grand Prix	126
2	(Spain) Barwa Addax Team	113
3	(Spain) Fat Burner Racing Engineering	57
4	(United Kingdom) Super Nova Racing	46
5	(Netherlands) Telmex Arden International	41

- Note: Only the top five positions are included for both sets of standings.

== Notes ==
Previous round: 2009 Belgian GP2 round	GP2 Series; 2009 season	Next round: 2009 Portuguese GP2 round
Previous round: 2008 Monza GP2 Series round	Italian GP2 round	Next round: 2010 Italian GP2 round
