= 2009 Valencia GP2 Series round =

2009 GP2 race held in Spain

(Spain) 2009 Valencian GP2 round
Round details
- Round 7 of 10 rounds in the 2009 GP2 Series
- Circuit de Valencia
- Location: Valencia Street Circuit, Valencia, Spain
- Course: Street Course; 5.419 km (3.367 mi)

GP2 Series

Feature race
- Date: 22 August 2009
- Laps: 31

Pole position
Driver	(Germany) Nico Hülkenberg	ART Grand Prix
- Time: 1:45.025

Podium
First	(Russia) Vitaly Petrov	Barwa Addax Team
Second	(Germany) Nico Hülkenberg	ART Grand Prix
Third	(Mexico) Sergio Pérez	Arden International

Fastest lap
Driver	(Germany) Nico Hülkenberg	ART Grand Prix
- Time: 1:47.041 (on lap 18)

Sprint race
- Date: 23 August 2009
- Laps: 23

Podium
First	(Germany) Nico Hülkenberg	ART Grand Prix
Second	(Mexico) Sergio Pérez	Arden International
Third	(Russia) Vitaly Petrov	Barwa Addax Team

Fastest lap
Driver	(Germany) Nico Hülkenberg	ART Grand Prix
- Time: 1:46.487 (on lap 7)

The 2009 Valencian GP2 round was the seventh round of the 2009 GP2 Series season. It was held on August 22 and 23, 2009 at Valencia Street Circuit at Valencia, Spain. The race was used as a support race to the 2009 European Grand Prix. Last year's race was quite eventful, with championship frontrunners Giorgio Pantano and Bruno Senna retiring on the last lap, with Senna retiring just before the finish line. Past Winners include last year's Campos duo Vitaly Petrov and Lucas di Grassi, who both competed this year. This race saw a driver reshuffle with Davide Valsecchi moving to Barwa Addax Team in place of Romain Grosjean who now races in F1. Formula Three Euroseries Race Winner Stefano Coletti replaces Valsecchi at Durango. The round also saw the departure of FMS, who sold their stake back to Scuderia Coloni.

== Standings after the round ==
Drivers' Championship standings

Pos	Driver	Points
1	(Germany) Nico Hülkenberg	75
2	(Russia) Vitaly Petrov	55
3	(France) Romain Grosjean	45
4	(Brazil) Lucas di Grassi	40
5	(Venezuela) Pastor Maldonado	31

Teams' Championship standings

Pos	Team	Points
1	(France) ART Grand Prix	106
2	(Spain) Barwa Addax Team	100
3	(United Kingdom) Super Nova Racing	44
4	(Spain) Fat Burner Racing Engineering	40
5	(United Kingdom) Telmex Arden International	31

- Note: Only the top five positions are included for both sets of standings.

Previous round: 2009 Hungarian GP2 round	GP2 Series; 2009 season	Next round: 2009 Belgian GP2 round
Previous round: 2008 Valencia GP2 Series round	Valencian GP2 round	Next round: 2010 Valencian GP2 round
