= 2009 Hungaroring GP2 Series round =

Open wheel race event

(Hungary) 2009 Hungarian GP2 round
Round details
- Round 6 of 10 rounds in the 2009 GP2 Series
- Hungaroring
- Location: Hungaroring, Mogyoród, Pest, Hungary
- Course: Permanent racing facility 4.38 km (2.72 mi)

GP2 Series

Feature race
- Date: 25 July 2009
- Laps: 42

Pole position
Driver	(Brazil) Lucas di Grassi	F. B. Racing Engineering
- Time: 1:27.867

Podium
First	(Germany) Nico Hülkenberg	ART Grand Prix
Second	(Brazil) Lucas di Grassi	F. B. Racing Engineering
Third	(Spain) Javier Villa	Super Nova Racing

Fastest lap
Driver	(Germany) Nico Hülkenberg	ART Grand Prix
- Time: 1:30.531 (on lap 40)

Sprint race
- Date: 26 July 2009
- Laps: 28

Podium
First	(Netherlands) Giedo van der Garde	iSport International
Second	(Italy) Luca Filippi	Super Nova Racing
Third	(Brazil) Lucas di Grassi	F. B. Racing Engineering

Fastest lap
Driver	(Italy) Luca Filippi	Super Nova Racing
- Time: 1:29.788 (on lap 3)

The 2009 Hungarian GP2 round was the sixth round of the 2009 GP2 Series season. It was held on July 25 and July 26, 2009 at Hungaroring in Mogyoród, Pest, Hungary. The race was used as a support race to the 2009 Hungarian Grand Prix.

Lucas di Grassi got his first ever pole position in GP2, despite being in the series for three years. Nico Hülkenberg won the first race, the German's third win in succession. Giedo van der Garde got the first points for iSport International since Spain with seventh, and followed that up with victory in the sprint race, his first victory in GP2.

Hülkenberg left Hungary with 57 points, still in the lead of the championship. ART Grand Prix and Barwa Addax Team were separated by 2 points in the teams championship.

== Standings after the round ==
Drivers' Championship standings

Pos	Driver	Points
1	(Germany) Nico Hülkenberg	57
2	(France) Romain Grosjean	45
3	(Russia) Vitaly Petrov	41
4	(Brazil) Lucas di Grassi	40
5	(Venezuela) Pastor Maldonado	31

Teams' Championship standings

Pos	Team	Points
1	(France) ART Grand Prix	88
2	(Spain) Barwa Addax Team	86
3	(United Kingdom) Super Nova Racing	42
4	(Spain) Fat Burner Racing Engineering	40
5	(France) DAMS	25

- Note: Only the top five positions are included for both sets of standings.

Previous round: 2009 German GP2 round	GP2 Series; 2009 season	Next round: 2009 Valencian GP2 round
Previous round: 2008 Hungaroring GP2 Series round	Hungarian GP2 round	Next round: 2010 Hungarian GP2 round
