= 2009 Istanbul Park GP2 Series round =

(Turkey) 2009 Turkish GP2 round
Round details
- Round 3 of 10 rounds in the 2009 GP2 Series
- Istanbul Park
- Location: Istanbul Park, Tuzla, Turkey
- Course: Permanent racing facility 5.34 km (3.32 mi)

GP2 Series

Feature race
- Date: 6 June 2009
- Laps: 34

Pole position
Driver	(Germany) Nico Hülkenberg	ART Grand Prix
- Time: 1:34.404

Podium
First	(Russia) Vitaly Petrov	Barwa Addax Team
Second	(Italy) Luca Filippi	Super Nova Racing
Third	(Italy) Davide Valsecchi	Durango

Fastest lap
Driver	(India) Karun Chandhok	O. Racing Technology
- Time: 1:36.679 (on lap 14)

Sprint race
- Date: 7 June 2009
- Laps: 23

Podium
First	(Brazil) Lucas di Grassi	F. B. Racing Engineering
Second	(Spain) Javier Villa	Super Nova Racing
Third	(Russia) Vitaly Petrov	Barwa Addax Team

Fastest lap
Driver	(Brazil) Lucas di Grassi	F. B. Racing Engineering
- Time: 1:36.725 (on lap 8)

The 2009 Turkish GP2 Race was the third race of the 2009 GP2 Series season. It was held on June 6 and 7, 2009 at Istanbul Racing Circuit in Tuzla, Turkey. The race was used as a support race to the 2009 Turkish Grand Prix.

The Feature race was won by Vitaly Petrov after an eventful Race which saw many safety car periods. Championship leader Romain Grosjean did not finish, like almost half the field. Lucas di Grassi of Racing Engineering won his first race of the season in Sprint Race after being given pole due to penalties issued after the feature race.

Karun Chandhok set the fastest lap in the Sprint Race, but he was not awarded a point for it. This is because he finished outside the top ten. The point for the fastest lap of the race goes to the driver inside the top ten, who was fastest around the circuit, in this case Vitaly Petrov. This allowed the Russian to increase his lead with an extra point.

== Standings after the round ==
Drivers' Championship standings

Pos	Driver	Points
1	(Russia) Vitaly Petrov	33
2	(France) Romain Grosjean	31
3	(Belgium) Jérôme d'Ambrosio	18
4	(Venezuela) Pastor Maldonado	17
5	(Germany) Nico Hülkenberg	17

Teams' Championship standings

Pos	Team	Points
1	(Spain) Barwa Addax Team	64
2	(France) ART Grand Prix	34
3	(France) DAMS	21
4	(United Kingdom) Super Nova Racing	20
5	(Spain) Fat Burner Racing Engineering	16

- Note: Only the top five positions are included for both sets of standings.

Previous round: 2009 Monaco GP2 round	GP2 Series; 2009 season	Next round: 2009 British GP2 round
Previous round: 2008 Turkish GP2 round	Turkish GP2 round	Next round: 2010 Turkish GP2 round
