= Roldán Rodríguez =

Spanish racing driver (born 1984)

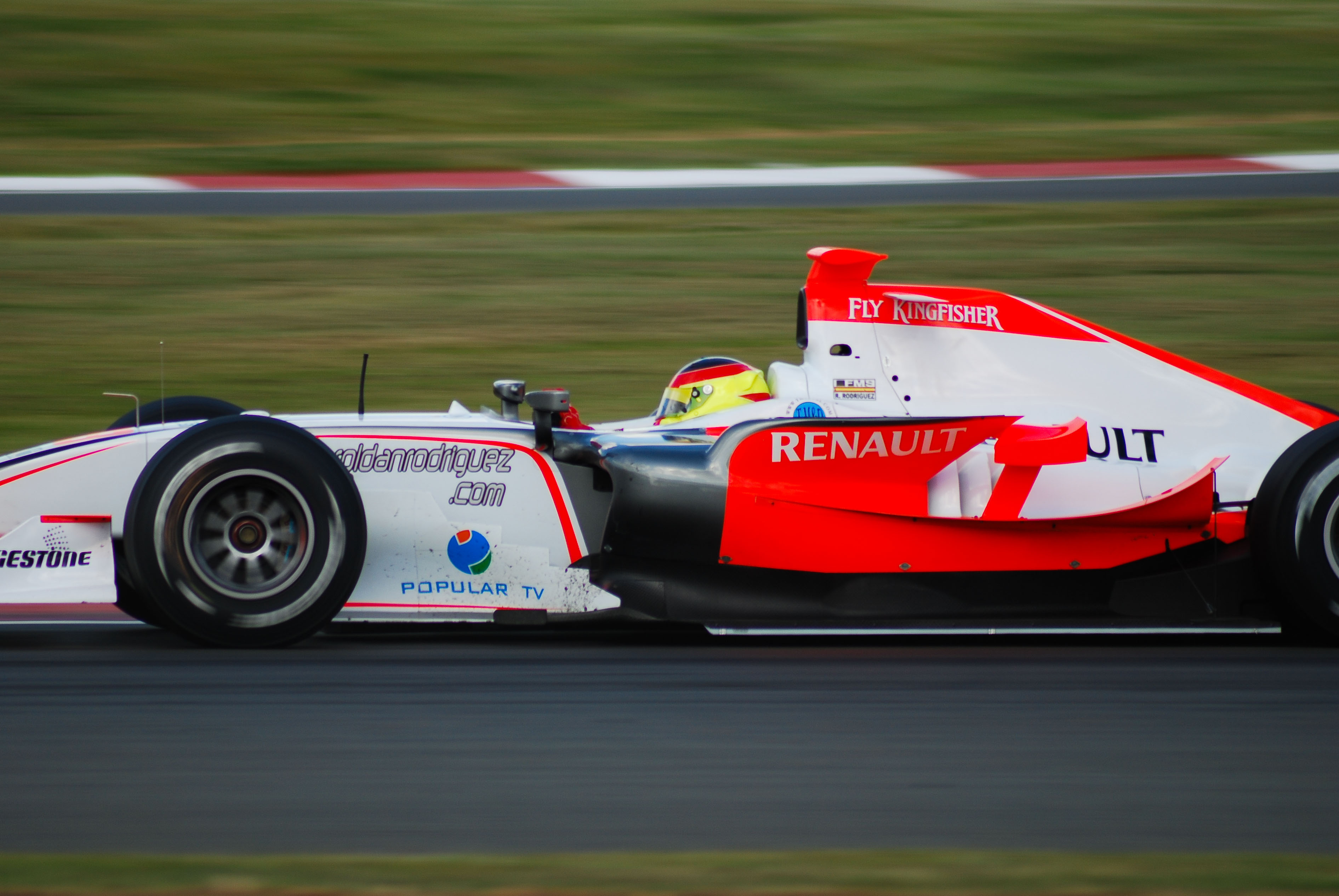
- Nationality: (Spain) Spanish
- Born: Roldán Rodríguez Iglesias; 9 November 1984 (age 41) Valladolid, Spain

Previous series
- 2008–2009–10 2008 2007–09 2006, 2008–09 2004 2003–06 2002–03 2002: GP2 Asia Series; International GT Open; GP2 Series; Euro/Italian Formula 3000; World Series by Nissan; Spanish F3 Championship; Formula Junior 1600 Spain; Formula Lliure

Roldán Rodríguez Iglesias (born 9 November 1984 in Valladolid) is a Spanish former racing driver, who competed in the GP2 Series from 2007 to 2009. Prior to this, he competed in Spanish Formula Three and various Formula 3000 categories.

== Career ==
=== Formula Three ===
After competing in Formula Junior 1600 Spain in 2002, Rodríguez graduated to the Spanish Formula Three Championship in 2003 in remained there for the next four seasons, gradually improving to finish as series runner-up in 2006, behind Ricardo Risatti.

=== Nissan World Series ===
In 2004, Rodríguez dovetailed part-time campaigns in F3 and the Nissan World Series, in which he scored two points from nine races.

=== Euroseries 3000 ===
Rodríguez drove for the Minardi Euroseries 3000 team in 2006 alongside his Spanish F3 campaign.

=== GP2 Series ===
Giancarlo Minardi's team-up with Hitech/Piquet Sports for the 2007 GP2 Series season led to Rodríguez securing the second seat in the team, alongside Alexandre Negrão. He finished the season in 17th place.

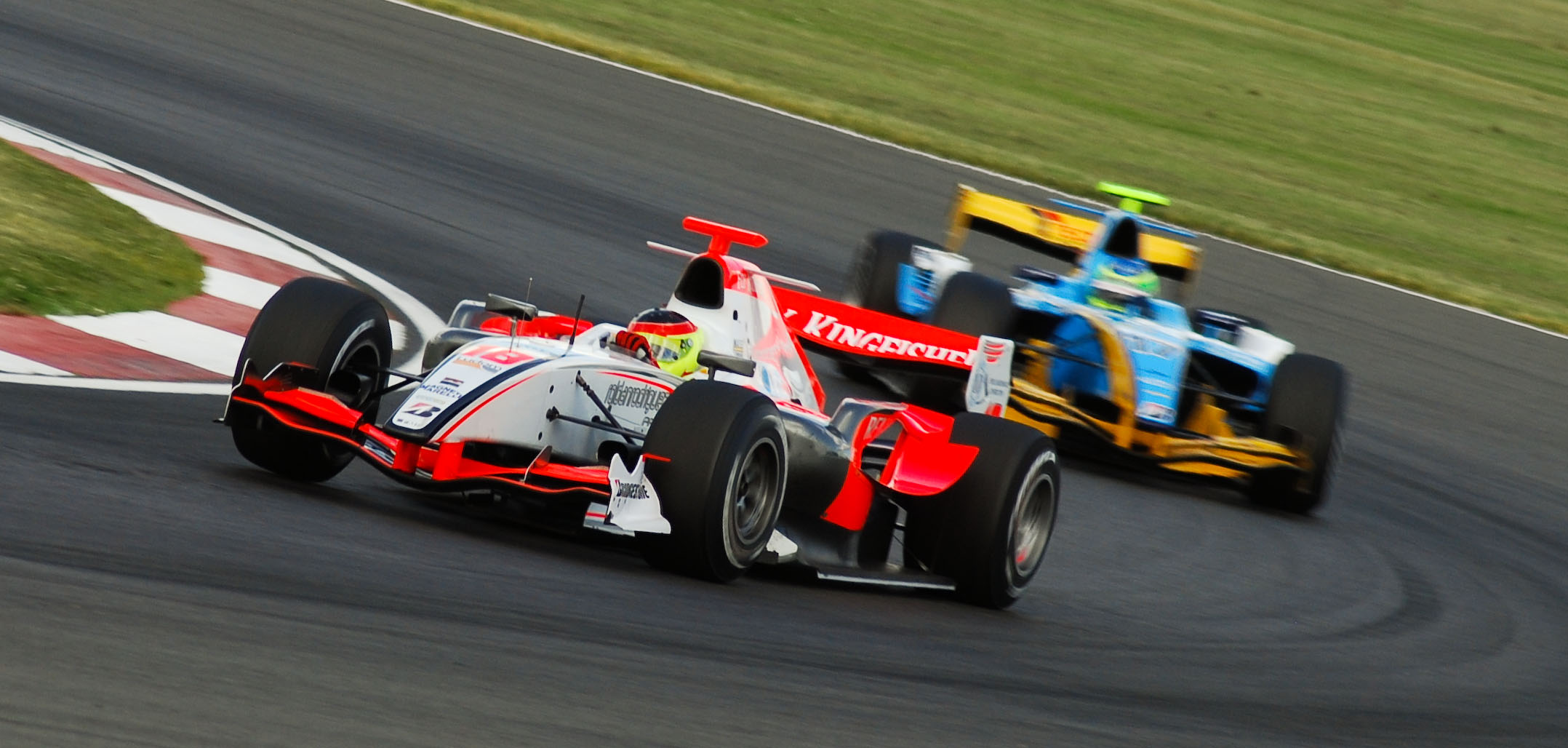
Rodríguez driving for FMS International at the Silverstone round of the 2008 GP2 Series season.

After initially beginning 2008 without a GP2 drive, Rodríguez replaced the injured Michael Herck at Fisichella Motor Sport for the last round of the GP2 Asia Series, then kept his seat with the team for the main 2008 GP2 Series season, replacing Andy Soucek who had been expected to fill the seat. He finished thirteenth in the championship, an improvement upon the previous year.

Rodríguez returned to Piquet GP to compete in the 2008–09 GP2 Asia Series season, where he finished third behind Kamui Kobayashi and Jérôme d'Ambrosio, and the 2009 GP2 Series season, where he finished eleventh.

Rodríguez rejoined Scuderia Coloni, the old Fisichella Motor Sport team, for the 2009–10 GP2 Asia Series season but was replaced by Alberto Valerio after the first round.

=== Formula One ===
Rodríguez tested for Minardi during the 2005 season at the circuit of Vallelunga (Italy).

Rodríguez was signed by the Spyker Formula One team as a test driver for the winter of 2007–2008. Rodriguez had a test with them in the middle of the season at Silverstone. During the 2008 pre-season, he was testing with Force India (former Spyker) to become an official driver, however Rodríguez was rejected in favor of Giancarlo Fisichella

Rodríguez was linked with a race seat at Formula One newcomers Campos Grand Prix for 2010, but has announced that he would be taking a sabbatical from motorsport instead.

== Racing record ==
=== Complete Spanish Formula Three Championship results ===
(key) (Races in bold indicate pole position) (Races in italics indicate fastest lap)

Year	Entrant	1	2	3	4	5	6	7	8	9	10	11	12	13	14	15	16	DC	Points
2003	Elide Racing	ALB; 1; 12	ALB; 2; 6	JAR; 1 Ret	JAR; 2; 9	JER; 1; 13	JER; 2 Ret											14th	59
2003	ECA Racing							EST; 1; 9	EST; 2; 6	VAL; 1; 6	VAL; 2; 8	JER; Ret	CAT; 1 DNS	CAT; 2 Ret				14th	59
2004	Adrián Campos Motorsport	ALB; 1	ALB; 2	JAR; 1	JAR; 2	JER; 1	JER; 2	EST; 1; 11	EST; 1; 9	VAL; 1; 6	VAL; 2; 4	JER; 1; 9	JER; 2; 11	CAT; 1; 11	CAT; 2; 11			11th	16
2005	Campos Racing	JAR; 1 Ret	JAR; 2; 2	VAL; 1; 4	VAL; 2; 6	ALB; 8	EST; 1 Ret	EST; 2; 17	ALB; 1 Ret	ALB; 2; 10	VAL; 1; 3	VAL; 2; 5	JER; 1 Ret	JER; 2; 4	CAT; 1; 8	CAT; 2 Ret		7th	35
2006	Campos Racing	VAL; 1; 2	VAL; 2; 11	MAG; 1; 9	MAG; 2; 5	JAR; 1; 5	JAR; 2; 16	EST; 1; 4	EST; 2; 1	**ALB**; **1**; 1	ALB; 2; 7	VAL; 1; 4	VAL; 2; 1	**JER**; **1**; 1	JER; 2; 7	CAT; 1; 4	CAT; 2; 6	2nd	103

=== Complete World Series by Nissan results ===
(key) (Races in bold indicate pole position) (Races in italics indicate fastest lap)

Year	Entrant	1	2	3	4	5	6	7	8	9	10	11	12	13	14	15	16	17	18	DC	Points
2004	Porfesa Competicion	JAR; 1 Ret	JAR; 2 Ret	ZOL; 1; 16	ZOL; 2; 15	MAG; 1; 14	MAG; 2; 13	VAL; 1; 9	VAL; 2; 11	LAU; 1; 13	LAU; 2 DNS	EST; 1	EST; 2	CAT; 1	CAT; 2	VAL; 1	VAL; 2	JER; 1	JER; 2	21st	2

=== Complete Euroseries 3000 results ===
(key) (Races in bold indicate pole position) (Races in italics indicate fastest lap)

Year	Entrant	1	2	3	4	5	6	7	8	9	10	11	12	13	14	15	16	17	18	DC	Points
2006	Minardi by GP Racing	ADR; 1	ADR; 2	IMO; 1; 4	IMO; 2; 5	SPA; 1; 3	SPA; 2; 6	HUN; 1; 11	HUN; 2; 5	MUG; 1 DNS	MUG; 2; 9	SIL; 1; 4	SIL; 2 Ret	**CAT**; **1**; 1	CAT; 2; 10	**VLL**; **1** Ret	VLL; 2; 6	MIS; 1	MIS; 2	6th	38
2008	GP Racing	VLL; 1; 2	VLL; 2; 1	SPA; 1	SPA; 2	VAL; 1; 1	VAL; 2; 5	MUG; 1	MUG; 2	MIS; 1	MIS; 2	JER; 1	JER; 2	CAT; 1	CAT; 2	MAG; 1	MAG; 2			8th	26
2009	FMS International	ALG; 1 Ret	ALG; 2; 6	MAG; 1	MAG; 2	DON; 1	DON; 2	ZOL; 1	ZOL; 2	VAL; 1	VAL; 2	VLL; 1	VLL; 2	MNZ; 1	MNZ; 2					17th	0

=== Complete GP2 Series results ===
(key) (Races in bold indicate pole position) (Races in italics indicate fastest lap)

Year	Entrant	1	2	3	4	5	6	7	8	9	10	11	12	13	14	15	16	17	18	19	20	21	DC	Points
2007	Minardi Piquet Sports	BHR; FEA; Ret	BHR; SPR; 12	CAT; FEA; 4	CAT; SPR; Ret	MON; FEA; Ret	MAG; FEA; 16	MAG; SPR; 9	SIL; FEA; 8	SIL; SPR; 11	NÜR; FEA; 10	NÜR; SPR; 9	HUN; FEA; 6	HUN; SPR; 3	IST; FEA; 11	IST; SPR; 8	MNZ; FEA; Ret	MNZ; SPR; 8	SPA; FEA; 15	SPA; SPR; 10	VAL; FEA; Ret	VAL; SPR; 17	17th	14
2008	Fisichella Motor Sport International	CAT; FEA; Ret	CAT; SPR; Ret	IST; FEA; 12	IST; SPR; 13	MON; FEA; 6	MON; SPR; 4	MAG; FEA; Ret	MAG; SPR; 16	SIL; FEA; 11	SIL; SPR; Ret	HOC; FEA; 18	HOC; SPR; 16	HUN; FEA; 19	HUN; SPR; Ret	VAL; FEA; Ret	VAL; SPR; 10	SPA; FEA; 21†	SPA; SPR; Ret	MNZ; FEA; 6	MNZ; SPR; 2		13th	14
2009	Piquet GP	CAT; FEA; Ret	CAT; SPR; Ret	MON; FEA; 11	MON; SPR; Ret	IST; FEA; Ret	IST; SPR; 17	SIL; FEA; 12	SIL; SPR; 9	NÜR; FEA; 2	NÜR; SPR; Ret	HUN; FEA; Ret	HUN; SPR; 13	VAL; FEA; 5	VAL; SPR; Ret	SPA; FEA; 5	SPA; SPR; 2	MNZ; FEA; 13	MNZ; SPR; 7	ALG; FEA; 5	ALG; SPR; Ret		11th	25

==== Complete GP2 Asia Series results ====
(key) (Races in bold indicate pole position) (Races in italics indicate fastest lap)

Year	Entrant	1	2	3	4	5	6	7	8	9	10	11	12	DC	Points
2008	FMS International	DUB1; FEA	DUB1; SPR	SEN; FEA	SEN; SPR	SEP; FEA	SEP; SPR	BHR; FEA	BHR; SPR	DUB2; FEA; 15	DUB2; SPR; Ret			29th	0
2008–09	Piquet GP	**SHI**; **FEA**; 1	SHI; SPR; 6	DUB; FEA; 3	DUB; SPR; C	BHR1; FEA; 6	BHR1; SPR; 23	LSL; FEA; Ret	LSL; SPR; 17	SEP; FEA; 4	SEP; SPR; 12	BHR2; FEA; 2	BHR2; SPR; Ret	**3rd**	**35**
2009–10	Scuderia Coloni	YMC1; FEA; 10	YMC1; SPR; 14	YMC2; FEA	YMC2; SPR	BHR1; FEA	BHR1; SPR	BHR2; FEA	BHR2; SPR					23rd	0
