= Alberto Valerio =

Brazilian racing driver (born 1985)

Alberto Valério
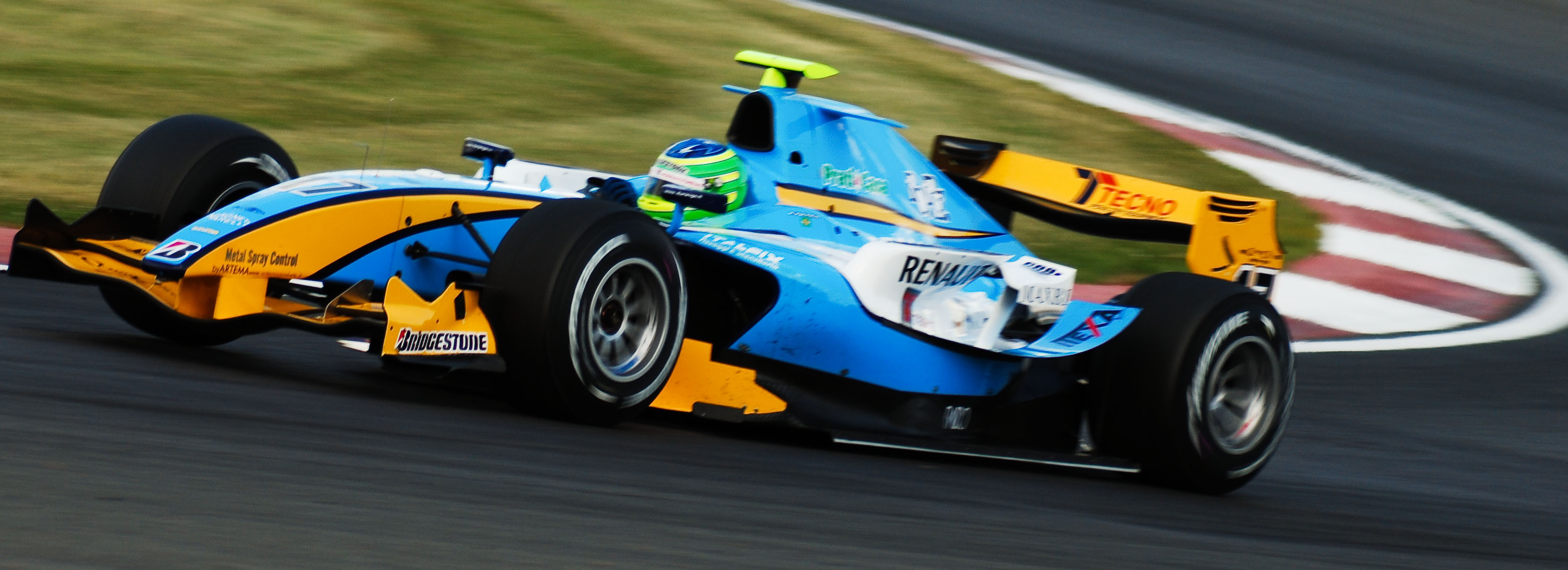
- Valério driving for Durango at the Silverstone round of the 2008 GP2 Series season.
- Nationality: (Brazil) Brazilian
- Born: 6 September 1985 (age 41) Ipatinga, Minas Gerais, Brazil

GP2 Series career
- Debut season: 2008
- Current team: Scuderia Coloni
- Car number: 20
- Former teams: Piquet GP; Durango
- Starts: 53
- Wins: 1
- Poles: 0
- Fastest laps: 0
- Best finish: 15th in 2009

Previous series
- 2008–2009–10 2006–07, 2009 2006–07 2004–05 2003–05: GP2 Asia Series; Formula Renault 3.5 Series; British Formula 3 Brazilian Formula Renault; Formula Three Sudamericana

Championship titles
- 2005: Formula Three Sudamericana

Alberto Januário "Betinho" Gontijo Valério (born 6 September 1985) is a Brazilian former racing driver.

== Career ==
=== Formula Three ===
Valerio drove in the Formula Three Sudamericana championship from 2003 to 2005, winning the title in his final year of the category. For 2006 he moved to the British championship, finishing 11th in the championship. 2007 saw him move to the Carlin Motorsport team and improve to eighth place in the standings.

=== Formula Renault ===
In 2004 and 2005, Valerio also drove at selected races in the Brazilian Formula Renault series. In 2006 and 2007, he drove in four races overall in the more prestigious Formula Renault 3.5 Series.

=== GP2 Series ===
For 2008, Valerio signed to drive for the Durango team in both the GP2 Series and the inaugural GP2 Asia Series.

Valerio returned to the GP2 Asia Series for the second round onwards of the 2008–09 season by replacing Giacomo Ricci in the Trident Racing team. But he himself was replaced for the third round by Frankie Provenzano.

For 2009, Valerio returned to the GP2 Series but moved to the Piquet GP squad as team-mate to Roldán Rodríguez. He took his first win with the team, as he dominated the feature race at Silverstone. He finished fifteenth in the championship.

Valerio moved to Coloni for the 2010 season, but was dropped in favour of Álvaro Parente.

=== Stock Car Brasil ===
In 2011, Valério returned to Brazil to compete in three Stock Car Brasil races for the Amir Nasr Racing team. Valério returned to the category in 2017, racing for Full Time Bassani alongside Diego Nunes. But on 25 October 2017, Bassani announced that Valério would be replaced before the 11th round in Goiânia by António Félix da Costa.

=== Retirement ===
Following 2017, Valério has retired from participating full-time in any championships. He now works as a driver coach in the Porsche Cup Brasil, where he has occasionally competed.

== Racing record ==
=== Career summary ===
Season	Series	Team name	Races	Poles	Wins	Points	Final Placing
2003	Formula Three Sudamericana	Dragão Motorsport	4	0	0	11	18th
2004	Formula Three Sudamericana	Cesário Junior	18	0	0	58	6th
2004	Formula Renault 2000 Brazil	Dragão Motorsport	3	0	0	0	NC
2005	Formula Three Sudamericana	Cesário F3	18	4	4	113	**1st**
2005	Formula Renault 2.0 Brazil	Cesário FRenault	4	0	0	22	15th
2006	British Formula 3	Cesário Formula UK	22	0	0	42	11th
2006	Formula Renault 3.5 Series	EuroInternational	2	0	0	0	NC
2007	British Formula 3	Carlin Motorsport	20	0	0	114	8th
2007	Formula Renault 3.5 Series	Victory Engineering	2	0	0	0	NC
2007	Masters of Formula Three	Victory Engineering	1	0	0	N/A	29th
2008	GP2 Series	Durango	19	0	0	0	26th
2008	GP2 Asia Series	Durango	10	0	0	2	19th
2008–09	GP2 Asia Series	Trident Racing	1	0	0	0	37th
2009	GP2 Series	Piquet GP	20	0	1	16	15th
2009	Formula Renault 3.5 Series	Comtec Racing	2	0	0	0	36th
2009–10	GP2 Asia Series	Scuderia Coloni	2	0	0	0	32nd
2010	GP2 Series	Scuderia Coloni	14	0	0	4	22nd
2011	Stock Car Brasil	Amir Nasr Racing	3	0	0	0	32nd
2016	Porsche GT3 Cup Brasil	Dener Motorsport	3	0	0	129	11th
2017	Stock Car Brasil	Full Time Bassani	19	0	0	33	27th
2017	Porsche GT3 Cup Brasil	Dener Motorsport	2	0	0	62	17th
2021	Porsche GT3 Cup Brasil	Dener Motorsport	1	0	0	0	53rd

=== Complete Formula Renault 3.5 Series results ===
(key) (Races in bold indicate pole position) (Races in italics indicate fastest lap)

Year	Team	1	2	3	4	5	6	7	8	9	10	11	12	13	14	15	16	17	Pos	Points
2006	Eurointernational	ZOL; 1	ZOL; 2	MON; 1	IST; 1	IST; 2	MIS; 1	MIS; 2	SPA; 1	SPA; 2	NÜR; 1	NÜR; 2	DON; 1	DON; 2	LMS; 1	LMS; 2	CAT; 1; 19	CAT; 2 Ret	44th	0
2007	Victory Engineering	MNZ; 1	MNZ; 2	NÜR; 1	NÜR; 2	MON; 1>	HUN; 1	HUN; 2	SPA; 1	SPA; 2	DON; 1	DON; 2	MAG; 1	MAG; 2	EST; 1	EST; 2	CAT; 1 Ret	CAT; 2 Ret	NC	0
2009	Comtec Racing	CAT; 1	CAT; 2	SPA; 1	SPA; 2	MON; 1	HUN; 1	HUN; 2	SIL; 1	SIL; 2	BUG; 1	BUG; 2	ALG; 1; 17	ALG; 2; 16	NÜR; 1	NÜR; 2	ALC; 1	ALC; 2	36th	0

=== Complete GP2 Series results ===
(key) (Races in bold indicate pole position) (Races in italics indicate fastest lap)

Year	Entrant	1	2	3	4	5	6	7	8	9	10	11	12	13	14	15	16	17	18	19	20	DC	Points
2008	Durango	CAT; FEA; 13	CAT; SPR; Ret	IST; FEA; 18	IST; SPR; 7	MON; FEA; Ret	MON; SPR; Ret	MAG; FEA; 18	MAG; SPR; 17	SIL; FEA; 21	SIL; SPR; 9	HOC; FEA; 9	HOC; SPR; 15	HUN; FEA; DNS	HUN; SPR; 17	VAL; FEA; Ret	VAL; SPR; 12	SPA; FEA; Ret	SPA; SPR; Ret	MNZ; FEA; 12	MNZ; SPR; 15	26th	0
2009	Piquet GP	CAT; FEA; 15	CAT; SPR; 13	MON; FEA; Ret	MON; SPR; Ret	IST; FEA; 4	IST; SPR; 6	SIL; FEA; 1	SIL; SPR; 7	NÜR; FEA; Ret	NÜR; SPR; 17	HUN; FEA; Ret	HUN; SPR; 21	VAL; FEA; 17	VAL; SPR; 10	SPA; FEA; Ret	SPA; SPR; 12	MNZ; FEA; Ret	MNZ; SPR; 11	ALG; FEA; Ret	ALG; SPR; 7	15th	16
2010	Scuderia Coloni	CAT; FEA; 14	CAT; SPR; Ret	MON; FEA; 5	MON; SPR; Ret	IST; FEA; 17	IST; SPR; 19	VAL; FEA; 9	VAL; SPR; Ret	SIL; FEA; 14	SIL; SPR; 22	HOC; FEA; 11	HOC; SPR; 12	HUN; FEA; Ret	HUN; SPR; 12	SPA; FEA	SPA; SPR	MNZ; FEA	MNZ; SPR	YMC; FEA	YMC; SPR	22nd	4

==== Complete GP2 Asia Series results ====
(key) (Races in bold indicate pole position) (Races in italics indicate fastest lap)

Year	Entrant	1	2	3	4	5	6	7	8	9	10	11	12	DC	Points
2008	Durango	DUB1; FEA; 9	DUB1; SPR; 5	SEN; FEA; Ret	SEN; SPR; Ret	SEP; FEA; Ret	SEP; SPR; 17	BHR; FEA; DNS	BHR; SPR; 17	DUB2; FEA; 13	DUB2; SPR; 15			19th	2
2008–09	Trident Racing	SHI; FEA	SHI; SPR	DUB; FEA; 16	DUB; SPR; C	BHR1; FEA	BHR1; SPR	LSL; FEA	LSL; SPR	SEP; FEA	SEP; SPR	BHR2; FEA	BHR2; SPR	37th	0
2009–10	Scuderia Coloni	YMC1; FEA	YMC1; SPR	YMC2; FEA; 15	YMC2; SPR; 18	BHR1; FEA	BHR1; SPR	BHR2; FEA	BHR2; SPR					32nd	0

Sporting positions
Preceded by Alexandre Sarnes Negrão	Formula Three Sudamericana; Champion; 2005	Succeeded by Luiz Razia
