= 2009 Malaysian GP2 Asia Series round =

Motor race

(Malaysia) 2009 Malaysian GP2 round
Round details
- Round 5 of 6 rounds in the 2009 GP2 Series
- Location: Sepang International Circuit in Sepang, Malaysia
- Course: Permanent racing facility 5.543 km (3.445 mi)

GP2 Series

Feature race
- Date: 4 April 2009
- Laps: 33 (182.919 km)

Pole position
Driver	(Belgium) Jérôme d'Ambrosio	DAMS
- Time: 1:45.410

Podium
First	(Brazil) Diego Nunes	Piquet GP
Second	(Japan) Kamui Kobayashi	DAMS
Third	(United Kingdom) James Jakes	Super Nova Racing

Fastest lap
Driver	(Spain) Javier Villa (Note: Javier Villa set the fastest lap, but did not finish in the top 10, so was ineligible to be the point-scorer for the fastest lap. James Jakes was the point-scorer instead for setting the fastest lap of those finishing in the top 10.)	Super Nova Racing
- Time: 1:48.208 (on lap 21)

Sprint race
- Date: 5 April 2009
- Laps: 20 (110.860 km)

Podium
First	(Russia) Vitaly Petrov	Barwa Int Campos Team
Second	(Venezuela) Pastor Maldonado	ART Grand Prix
Third	(Italy) Davide Valsecchi	Durango

Fastest lap
Driver	(Portugal) Álvaro Parente	My Team Qi-Meritus Mahara
- Time: 2:03.508 (on lap 20)

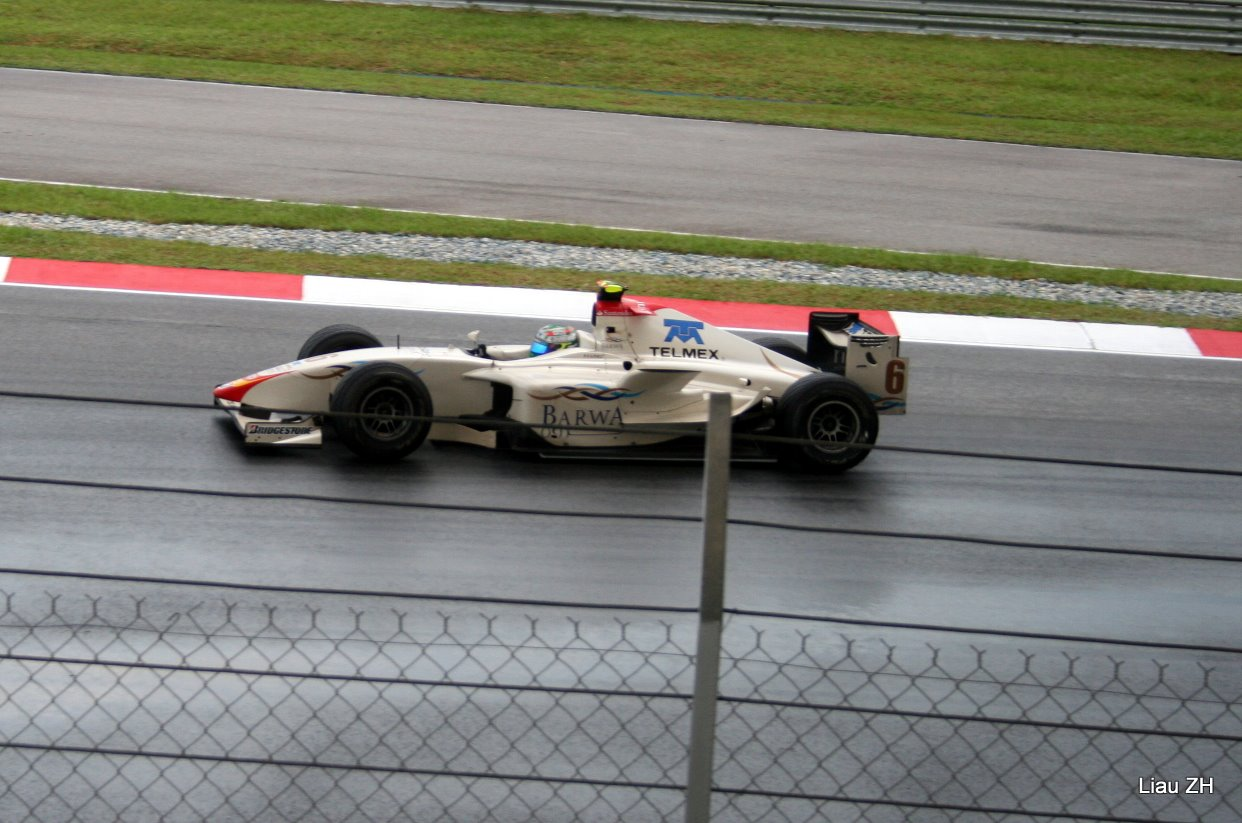
Sergio Pérez

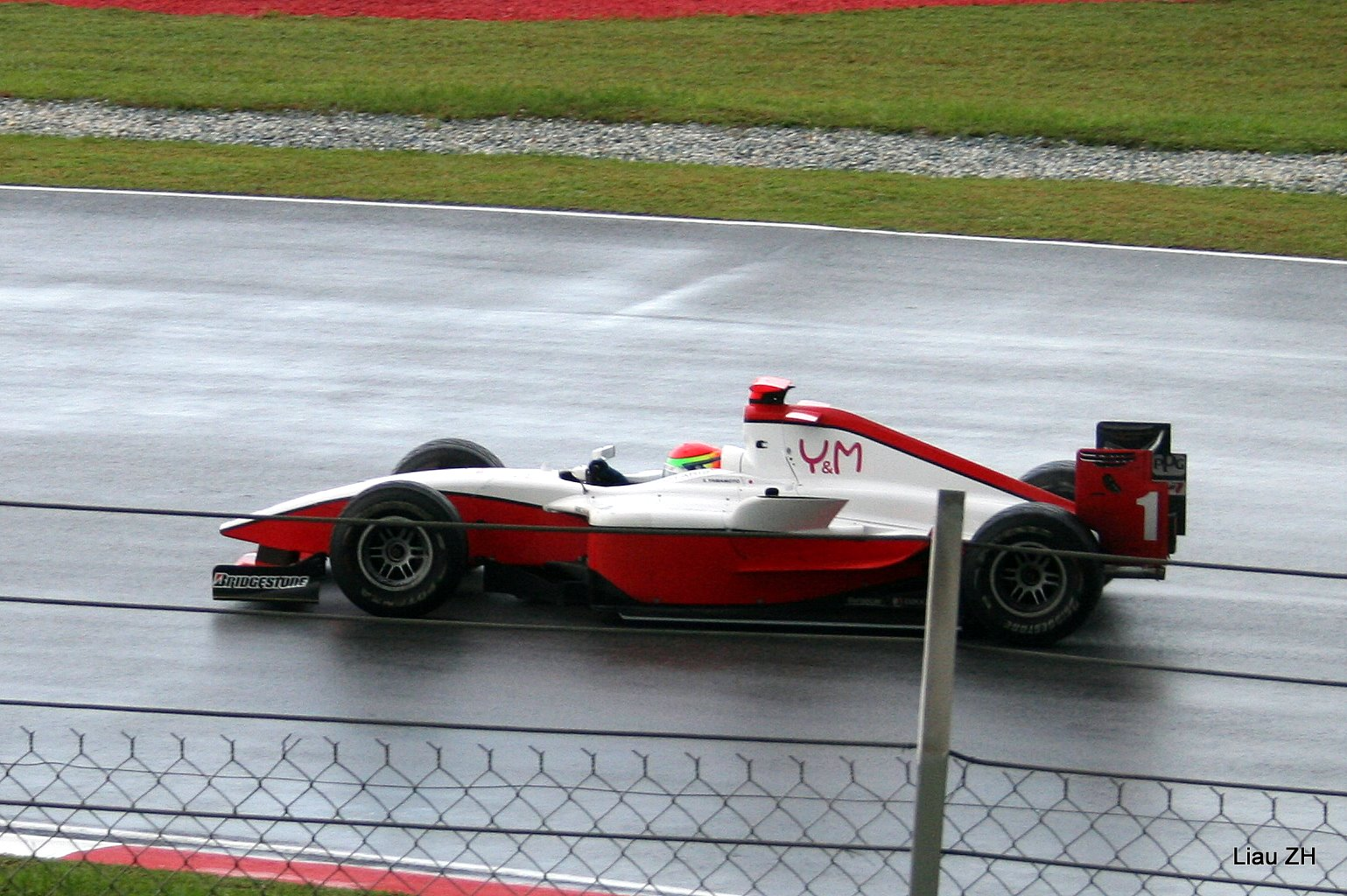
Sakon Yamamoto

The 2009 Malaysian GP2 Asia Series round was a GP2 Asia Series motor race held on 4 and 5 April 2009 at Sepang International Circuit in Sepang, Malaysia. It was the fifth round of the 2008–09 GP2 Asia Series. The race supported the 2009 Malaysian Grand Prix.

== Classification ==
=== Qualifying ===
Pos.	No.	Driver	Team	Time	Gap	Grid
1	7	(Belgium) Jérôme d'Ambrosio	DAMS	1:45.410		1
2	21	(Brazil) Diego Nunes	Piquet GP	1:45.522	+0.112	2
3	12	(United Kingdom) James Jakes	Super Nova Racing	1:45.527	+0.117	3
4	8	(Japan) Kamui Kobayashi	DAMS	1:45.577	+0.167	4
5	11	(Spain) Javier Villa	Super Nova Racing	1:45.649	+0.239	5
6	5	(Russia) Vitaly Petrov	Barwa International Campos Team	1:45.720	+0.310	6
7	16	(Italy) Davide Valsecchi	Durango	1:45.748	+0.338	7
8	2	(Venezuela) Pastor Maldonado	ART Grand Prix	1:45.755	+0.345	8
9	20	(Spain) Roldán Rodríguez	Piquet GP	1:45.767	+0.357	9
10	19	(Portugal) Álvaro Parente	My Team Qi-Meritus Mahara	1:45.816	+0.406	10
11	24	(Netherlands) Yelmer Buurman	Ocean Racing Technology	1:45.954	+0.544	11
12	27	(Italy) Davide Rigon	Trident Racing	1:45.978	+0.568	12
13	3	(Brazil) Luiz Razia	Arden International Motorsport	1:45.989	+0.579	13
14	14	(Venezuela) Rodolfo González	Fisichella Motor Sport International	1:46.053	+0.643	14
15	1	(Japan) Sakon Yamamoto	ART Grand Prix	1:46.087	+0.677	15
16	9	(Netherlands) Giedo van der Garde	GFH Team iSport	1:46.105	+0.695	16
17	25	(Italy) Fabrizio Crestani	Ocean Racing Technology	1:46.108	+0.698	17
18	6	(Mexico) Sergio Pérez	Barwa International Campos Team	1:46.169	+0.759	18
19	4	(Italy) Edoardo Mortara	Arden International Motorsport	1:46.184	+0.774	19
20	22	(Romania) Michael Herck	DPR	1:46.259	+0.849	20
21	10	(Bahrain) Hamad Al Fardan	GFH Team iSport	1:46.265	+0.855	21
22	18	(Italy) Marco Bonanomi	My Team Qi-Meritus Mahara	1:46.315	+0.905	22
23	23	(Italy) Giacomo Ricci	DPR	1:46.604	+1.194	23
24	26	(Portugal) Ricardo Teixeira	Trident Racing	1:47.838	+2.428	24
25	15	(United States) Kevin Chen	Fisichella Motor Sport International	1:49.642	+4.232	25
26	17	(Italy) Michael Dalle Stelle	Durango	1:49.857	+4.447	26

=== Feature race ===
Pos.	No.	Driver	Team	Laps	Time/Retired	Grid	Points
1	21	(Brazil) Diego Nunes	Piquet GP	33	1:00:46.668	2	10
2	8	(Japan) Kamui Kobayashi	DAMS	33	+8.361	4	8
3	12	(United Kingdom) James Jakes	Super Nova Racing	33	+9.150	3	6+1
4	20	(Spain) Roldán Rodríguez	Piquet GP	33	+13.874	9	5
5	24	(Netherlands) Yelmer Buurman	Ocean Racing Technology	33	+16.805	11	4
6	5	(Russia) Vitaly Petrov	Barwa International Campos Team	33	+41.457	6	3
7	2	(Venezuela) Pastor Maldonado	ART Grand Prix	33	+42.007	8	2
8	16	(Italy) Davide Valsecchi	Durango	33	+42.381	7	1
9	10	(Bahrain) Hamad Al Fardan	GFH Team iSport	33	+51.152	21	
10	14	(Venezuela) Rodolfo González	Fisichella Motor Sport International	33	+53.240	14	
11	19	(Portugal) Álvaro Parente	My Team Qi-Meritus Mahara	33	+54.435	10	
12	1	(Japan) Sakon Yamamoto	ART Grand Prix	33	+59.958	15	
13	22	(Romania) Michael Herck	DPR	33	+1:01.473	20	
14	9	(Netherlands) Giedo van der Garde	GFH Team iSport	33	+1:02.518	16	
15	25	(Italy) Fabrizio Crestani	Ocean Racing Technology	33	+1:11.958	17	
16	23	(Italy) Giacomo Ricci	DPR	33	+1:34.318	23	
17	26	(Portugal) Ricardo Teixeira	Trident Racing	33	+1:50.428	24	
18	17	(Italy) Michael Dalle Stelle	Durango	33	+1:51.455	26	
19	11	(Spain) Javier Villa	Super Nova Racing	32	+1 lap	5	
20	15	(United States) Kevin Chen	Fisichella Motor Sport International	32	+1 lap	25	
Ret	18	(Italy) Marco Bonanomi	My Team Qi-Meritus Mahara	16	Retired	22	
Ret	6	(Mexico) Sergio Pérez	Barwa International Campos Team	14	Retired	18	
Ret	3	(Brazil) Luiz Razia	Arden International Motorsport	10	Retired	13	
Ret	27	(Italy) Davide Rigon	Trident Racing	0	Retired	12	
Ret	4	(Italy) Edoardo Mortara	Arden International Motorsport	0	Retired	19	
DNS	7	(Belgium) Jérôme d'Ambrosio	DAMS	0	Gearbox^{1}	1	2

Notes

- ^1 – Jérôme d'Ambrosio did not start due to a gearbox failure.

=== Sprint race ===
Pos.	No.	Driver	Team	Laps	Time/Retired	Grid	Points
1	5	(Russia) Vitaly Petrov	Barwa International Campos Team	20	45:41.349	3	6
2	2	(Venezuela) Pastor Maldonado	ART Grand Prix	20	+2.914	2	5
3	16	(Italy) Davide Valsecchi	Durango	20	+4.339	1	4
4	21	(Brazil) Diego Nunes	Piquet GP	20	+6.357	8	3
5	10	(Bahrain) Hamad Al Fardan	GFH Team iSport	20	+21.539	9	2
6	6	(Mexico) Sergio Pérez	Barwa International Campos Team	20	+24.489	22	1
7	8	(Japan) Kamui Kobayashi	DAMS	20	+24.522	7	
8	14	(Venezuela) Rodolfo González	Fisichella Motor Sport International	20	+26.108	10	
9	19	(Portugal) Álvaro Parente	My Team Qi-Meritus Mahara	20	+26.956	11	1
10	9	(Netherlands) Giedo van der Garde	GFH Team iSport	20	+35.725	14	
11	24	(Netherlands) Yelmer Buurman	Ocean Racing Technology	20	+37.306	4	
12	20	(Spain) Roldán Rodríguez	Piquet GP	20	+37.683	5	
13	27	(Italy) Davide Rigon	Trident Racing	20	+44.390	25	
14	18	(Italy) Marco Bonanomi	My Team Qi-Meritus Mahara	20	+46.358	21	
15	23	(Italy) Giacomo Ricci	DPR	20	+47.818	16	
16	25	(Italy) Fabrizio Crestani	Ocean Racing Technology	20	+48.476	15	
17	4	(Italy) Edoardo Mortara	Arden International Motorsport	20	+48.640	26	
18	11	(Spain) Javier Villa	Super Nova Racing	20	+1:09.849	19	
19	26	(Portugal) Ricardo Teixeira	Trident Racing	20	+1:21.557	17	
20	17	(Italy) Michael Dalle Stelle	Durango	20	+1:56.537	18	
Ret	1	(Japan) Sakon Yamamoto	ART Grand Prix	14	Retired	12	
Ret	22	(Romania) Michael Herck	DPR	9	Retired	13	
Ret	3	(Brazil) Luiz Razia	Arden International Motorsport	9	Retired	23	
Ret	15	(United States) Kevin Chen	Fisichella Motor Sport International	5	Retired	20	
Ret	12	(United Kingdom) James Jakes	Super Nova Racing	4	Retired	6	
DSQ	7	(Belgium) Jérôme d'Ambrosio	DAMS	14	Disqualified^{2}	24	

Notes

- ^2 – Jérôme d'Ambrosio was black flagged and disqualified from the race after a pass on Marco Bonanomi under a yellow flag, the belgian overshot turn 9, almost colliding with a group of marshalls attending to Michael Herck's stranded DPR car.

== Standings after the event ==
Drivers' Championship standings

	Pos.	Driver	Points
	1	(Japan) Kamui Kobayashi	47
	2	(Italy) Davide Valsecchi	34
4	3	(Russia) Vitaly Petrov	28
1	4	(Germany) Nico Hülkenberg	27
	5	(Spain) Roldán Rodríguez	27

Teams' Championship standings

	Pos.	Team	Points
	1	(France) DAMS	70
	2	(Spain) Barwa International Campos Team	54
	3	(France) ART Grand Prix	41
1	4	(Brazil) Piquet GP	40
1	5	(Italy) Durango	34

- Note: Only the top five positions are included for both sets of standings.

== See also ==
- 2009 Malaysian Grand Prix

== Notes ==
Previous round: 2009 Qatar GP2 Asia Series round	GP2 Asia Series Championship; 2008–09 season	Next round: 2009 Bahrain 2nd GP2 Asia Series round
Previous round: 2008 Malaysian GP2 Asia Series round	Malaysian GP2 Asia Series round	Next round: 2012 Sepang GP2 Series round
