= 2009 Bahrain 2nd GP2 Asia Series round =

Car racing competition

2009 Bahrain GP2 round
Round details
- Round 6 of 6 rounds in the 2009 GP2 Series
- Location: Bahrain International Circuit in Sakhir, Bahrain
- Course: Permanent racing facility 5.412 km (3.363 mi)

GP2 Series

Feature race
- Date: 25 April 2009
- Laps: 33 (178.596 km)

Pole position
Driver	(Japan) Kamui Kobayashi	DAMS
- Time: 1:43.863

Podium
First	(Brazil) Diego Nunes	Piquet GP
Second	(Spain) Roldán Rodríguez	Piquet GP
Third	(Belgium) Jérôme d'Ambrosio	DAMS

Fastest lap
Driver	(Belgium) Jérôme d'Ambrosio	DAMS
- Time: 1:46.954 (on lap 23)

Sprint race
- Date: 26 April 2009
- Laps: 23 (124.476 km)

Podium
First	(Brazil) Luiz Razia	Arden International Motorsport
Second	(Belgium) Jérôme d'Ambrosio	DAMS
Third	(Italy) Davide Rigon	Trident Racing

Fastest lap
Driver	(Belgium) Jérôme d'Ambrosio	DAMS
- Time: 1:46.648 (on lap 6)

The 2009 Bahrain 2nd GP2 Asia Series round was a GP2 Asia Series motor race held on 25 and 26 April 2009 at Bahrain International Circuit in Sakhir, Bahrain. It was the final showdown of the 2008–09 GP2 Asia Series. The race supported the 2009 Bahrain Grand Prix.

== Classification ==
=== Qualifying ===
Pos.	No.	Driver	Team	Time	Gap	Grid
1	7	(Belgium) Jérôme d'Ambrosio	DAMS	1:43.752		11
2	8	(Japan) Kamui Kobayashi	DAMS	1:43.863	+0.111	1
3	20	(Spain) Roldán Rodríguez	Piquet GP	1:43.910	+0.158	2
4	21	(Brazil) Diego Nunes	Piquet GP	1:44.014	+0.262	3
5	2	(Venezuela) Pastor Maldonado	ART Grand Prix	1:44.101	+0.349	4
6	3	(Brazil) Luiz Razia	Arden International Motorsport	1:44.141	+0.389	5
7	9	(Netherlands) Giedo van der Garde	GFH Team iSport	1:44.174	+0.422	6
8	16	(Italy) Davide Valsecchi	Durango	1:44.310	+0.558	7
9	11	(Spain) Javier Villa	Super Nova Racing	1:44.319	+0.567	8
10	19	(Portugal) Álvaro Parente	My Team Qi-Meritus Mahara	1:44.321	+0.569	9
11	24	(India) Karun Chandhok	Ocean Racing Technology	1:44.472	+0.720	10
12	18	(Italy) Marco Bonanomi	My Team Qi-Meritus Mahara	1:44.477	+0.725	12
13	6	(Mexico) Sergio Pérez	Barwa International Campos Team	1:44.546	+0.794	13
14	12	(United Kingdom) James Jakes	Super Nova Racing	1:44.552	+0.800	14
15	27	(Italy) Davide Rigon	Trident Racing	1:44.649	+0.897	15
16	10	(Bahrain) Hamad Al Fardan	GFH Team iSport	1:44.673	+0.921	16
17	1	(Japan) Sakon Yamamoto	ART Grand Prix	1:44.705	+0.953	17
18	14	(Venezuela) Rodolfo González	Fisichella Motor Sport International	1:44.747	+0.995	18
19	4	(Italy) Edoardo Mortara	Arden International Motorsport	1:44.864	+1.112	19
20	5	(Russia) Vitaly Petrov	Barwa International Campos Team	1:44.879	+1.127	20
21	22	(Romania) Michael Herck	DPR	1:44.921	+1.169	21
22	23	(Italy) Giacomo Ricci	DPR	1:45.676	+1.924	22
23	25	(Italy) Fabrizio Crestani	Ocean Racing Technology	1:45.837	+2.085	23
24	15	(United States) Kevin Chen	Fisichella Motor Sport International	1:46.428	+2.676	24
25	26	(Portugal) Ricardo Teixeira	Trident Racing	1:46.485	+2.733	25
26	17	(Italy) Michael Dalle Stelle	Durango	1:46.702	+2.950	26

- Jérôme d'Ambrosio recorded the fastest time in the time trial, but got a ten-place penalty after receiving a black flag in the previous Malaysian sprint race.

=== Feature race ===
Pos.	No.	Driver	Team	Laps	Time/Retired	Grid	Points
1	21	(Brazil) Diego Nunes	Piquet GP	33	59:59.025	3	10
2	20	(Spain) Roldán Rodríguez	Piquet GP	33	+4.906	2	8
3	7	(Belgium) Jérôme d'Ambrosio	DAMS	33	+7.905	11	6+1
4	8	(Japan) Kamui Kobayashi	DAMS	33	+15.282	1	5+2
5	9	(Netherlands) Giedo van der Garde	GFH Team iSport	33	+20.774	6	4
6	1	(Japan) Sakon Yamamoto	ART Grand Prix	33	+31.624	17	3
7	27	(Italy) Davide Rigon	Trident Racing	33	+48.010	15	2
8	3	(Brazil) Luiz Razia	Arden International Motorsport	33	+50.923	5	1
9	24	(India) Karun Chandhok	Ocean Racing Technology	33	+55.684	10	
10	12	(United Kingdom) James Jakes	Super Nova Racing	33	+55.853	14	
11	23	(Italy) Giacomo Ricci	DPR	33	+57.571	22	
12	6	(Mexico) Sergio Pérez	Barwa International Campos Team	33	+57.875	13	
13	22	(Romania) Michael Herck	DPR	33	+58.122	21	
14	18	(Italy) Marco Bonanomi	My Team Qi-Meritus Mahara	33	+1:05.328	12	
15	11	(Spain) Javier Villa	Super Nova Racing	33	+1:15.745	8	
16	16	(Italy) Davide Valsecchi	Durango	33	+1:18.479	7	
17	26	(Portugal) Ricardo Teixeira	Trident Racing	33	+1:28.508	25	
18	25	(Italy) Fabrizio Crestani	Ocean Racing Technology	32	+1 lap	23	
19	5	(Russia) Vitaly Petrov	Barwa International Campos Team	31	+2 laps	20	
Ret	14	(Venezuela) Rodolfo González	Fisichella Motor Sport International	16	Retired	18	
Ret	4	(Italy) Edoardo Mortara	Arden International Motorsport	12	Retired	19	
Ret	19	(Portugal) Álvaro Parente	My Team Qi-Meritus Mahara	12	Retired	9	
Ret	10	(Bahrain) Hamad Al Fardan	GFH Team iSport	7	Retired	16	
Ret	15	(United States) Kevin Chen	Fisichella Motor Sport International	4	Retired	24	
Ret	2	(Venezuela) Pastor Maldonado	ART Grand Prix	0	Retired	4	
Ret	17	(Italy) Michael Dalle Stelle	Durango	0	Retired	26	

=== Sprint race ===
Pos.	No.	Driver	Team	Laps	Time/Retired	Grid	Points
1	3	(Brazil) Luiz Razia	Arden International Motorsport	23	43:47.690	1	6
2	7	(Belgium) Jérôme d'Ambrosio	DAMS	23	+11.494	6	5+1
3	27	(Italy) Davide Rigon	Trident Racing	23	+12.646	2	4
4	1	(Japan) Sakon Yamamoto	ART Grand Prix	23	+13.349	3	3
5	8	(Japan) Kamui Kobayashi	DAMS	23	+13.892	5	2
6	21	(Brazil) Diego Nunes	Piquet GP	23	+19.362	8	1
7	9	(Netherlands) Giedo van der Garde	GFH Team iSport	23	+23.183	4	
8	18	(Italy) Marco Bonanomi	My Team Qi-Meritus Mahara	23	+27.813	14	
9	6	(Mexico) Sergio Pérez	Barwa International Campos Team	23	+31.989	12	
10	23	(Italy) Giacomo Ricci	DPR	23	+34.428	11	
11	5	(Russia) Vitaly Petrov	Barwa International Campos Team	23	+36.252	19	
12	11	(Spain) Javier Villa	Super Nova Racing	23	+36.666	15	
13	19	(Portugal) Álvaro Parente	My Team Qi-Meritus Mahara	23	+37.230	22	
14	12	(United Kingdom) James Jakes	Super Nova Racing	23	+39.266	10	
15	25	(Italy) Fabrizio Crestani	Ocean Racing Technology	23	+41.122	18	
16	4	(Italy) Edoardo Mortara	Arden International Motorsport	23	+42.111	21	
17	10	(Bahrain) Hamad Al Fardan	GFH Team iSport	23	+52.089	23	
18	15	(United States) Kevin Chen	Fisichella Motor Sport International	23	+1:05.417	24	
19	17	(Italy) Michael Dalle Stelle	Durango	23	+1:10.175	26	
Ret	22	(Romania) Michael Herck	DPR	16	Retired	13	
Ret	26	(Portugal) Ricardo Teixeira	Trident Racing	13	Retired	17	
Ret	20	(Spain) Roldán Rodríguez	Piquet GP	0	Retired	7	
Ret	24	(India) Karun Chandhok	Ocean Racing Technology	0	Retired	9	
Ret	16	(Italy) Davide Valsecchi	Durango	0	Retired	16	
Ret	14	(Venezuela) Rodolfo González	Fisichella Motor Sport International	0	Retired	20	
Ret	2	(Venezuela) Pastor Maldonado	ART Grand Prix	0	Retired	25	

== Standings after the event ==
Drivers' Championship standings

	Pos.	Driver	Points
	1	(Japan) Kamui Kobayashi	56
5	2	(Belgium) Jérôme d'Ambrosio	36
2	3	(Spain) Roldán Rodríguez	35
2	4	(Italy) Davide Valsecchi	34
2	5	(Russia) Vitaly Petrov	28

Teams' Championship standings

	Pos.	Team	Points
	1	(France) DAMS	92
2	2	(Brazil) Piquet GP	59
1	3	(Spain) Barwa International Campos Team	54
1	4	(France) ART Grand Prix	47
	5	(Italy) Durango	34

- Note: Only the top five positions are included for both sets of standings.

== See also ==
- 2009 Bahrain Grand Prix
- 2009 Bahrain 2nd Speedcar Series round

Previous round: 2009 Malaysian GP2 Asia Series round	GP2 Asia Series Championship; 2008–09 season	Next round: 2009 Yas Marina GP2 Asia Series round
Previous round: 2009 Bahrain 1st GP2 Asia Series round	Bahrain GP2 Asia Series round	Next round: 2010 Bahrain 1st GP2 Asia Series round
