= 2008 Chinese GP2 Asia Series round =

(China) 2008 Chinese GP2 round
Round details
- Round 1 of 6 rounds in the 2008 GP2 Series
- Location: Shanghai International Circuit in Shanghai, China
- Course: Permanent racing facility 5.451 km (3.388 mi)

GP2 Series

Feature race
- Date: 18 October 2008
- Laps: 34 (185.334 km)

Pole position
Driver	(Spain) Roldán Rodríguez	Piquet GP
- Time: 1:45.233

Podium
First	(Spain) Roldán Rodríguez	Piquet GP
Second	(Japan) Kamui Kobayashi	DAMS
Third	(Japan) Sakon Yamamoto	ART Grand Prix

Fastest lap
Driver	(Japan) Kamui Kobayashi	DAMS
- Time: 1:46.407 (on lap 32)

Sprint race
- Date: 19 October 2008
- Laps: 23 (125.373 km)

Podium
First	(Italy) Davide Valsecchi	Durango
Second	(New Zealand) Earl Bamber	My Team Qi-Meritus Mahara
Third	(Spain) Javier Villa	Super Nova Racing

Fastest lap
Driver	(Japan) Sakon Yamamoto (Note: Sakon Yamamoto set the fastest lap, but did not finish in the top 10, so was ineligible to be the point-scorer for the fastest lap. Javier Villa was the point-scorer instead for setting the fastest lap of those finishing in the top 10.)	ART Grand Prix
- Time: 1:47.513 (on lap 23)

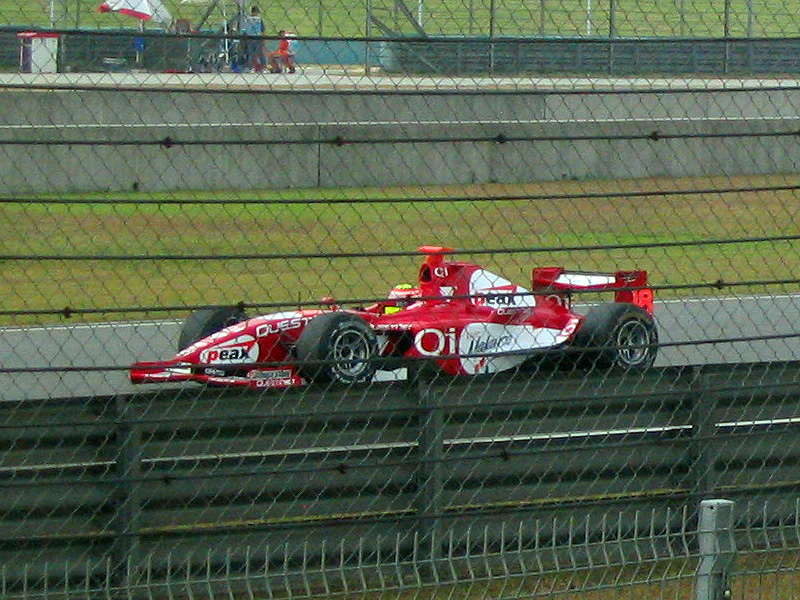
Alex Yoong drive Meritus's car in China.

The 2008 Chinese GP2 Asia Series round was a GP2 Asia Series motor race held on 18 and 19 October 2008 at Shanghai International Circuit in Shanghai, China. It was the first round of the 2008–09 GP2 Asia Series. The race supported the 2008 Chinese Grand Prix.

== Classification ==
=== Qualifying ===
Pos.	No.	Driver	Team	Time	Gap	Grid
1	20	(Spain) Roldán Rodríguez	Piquet GP	1:45.233		1
2	8	(Japan) Kamui Kobayashi	DAMS	1:45.418	+0.185	2
3	11	(Spain) Javier Villa	Super Nova Racing	1:45.643	+0.410	3
4	1	(Japan) Sakon Yamamoto	ART Grand Prix	1:45.643	+0.410	4
5	9	(Netherlands) Giedo van der Garde	GFH Team iSport	1:45.800	+0.567	5
6	5	(Russia) Vitaly Petrov	Barwa International Campos Team	1:45.843	+0.610	6
7	7	(Belgium) Jérôme d'Ambrosio	DAMS	1:45.885	+0.652	7
8	16	(Italy) Davide Valsecchi	Durango	1:46.009	+0.776	8
9	19	(New Zealand) Earl Bamber	My Team Qi-Meritus Mahara	1:46.060	+0.827	9
10	25	(Italy) Luca Filippi	BCN Competición	1:46.084	+0.851	10
11	3	(Brazil) Luiz Razia	Trust Team Arden	1:46.130	+0.897	11
12	21	(Brazil) Diego Nunes	Piquet GP	1:46.169	+0.936	12
13	2	(France) Nelson Philippe	ART Grand Prix	1:46.171	+0.938	13
14	10	(Bahrain) Hamad Al Fardan	GFH Team iSport	1:46.305	+1.072	14
15	4	(Finland) Mika Mäki	Trust Team Arden	1:46.504	+1.271	15
16	27	(New Zealand) Chris van der Drift	Trident Racing	1:46.595	+1.362	16
17	23	(Japan) Yuhi Sekiguchi	DPR	1:46.733	+1.500	17
18	6	(Mexico) Sergio Pérez	Barwa International Campos Team	1:46.809	+1.576	18
19	22	(Romania) Michael Herck	DPR	1:46.843	+1.610	19
20	26	(Italy) Giacomo Ricci	Trident Racing	1:47.010	+1.777	20
21	24	(Japan) Hiroki Yoshimoto	BCN Competición	1:47.231	+1.998	21
22	17	(Brazil) Carlos Iaconelli	Durango	1:47.355	+2.122	22
23	18	(Malaysia) Alex Yoong	My Team Qi-Meritus Mahara	1:47.652	+2.419	23
24	12	(United Kingdom) James Jakes	Super Nova Racing	1:49.026	+3.793	24
25	15	(United States) Kevin Chen	Fisichella Motor Sport International	1:49.413	+4.180	25
26	14	(United Arab Emirates) Andreas Zuber	Fisichella Motor Sport International	No Time^{1}		26

Notes

- ^1 – Andreas Zuber didn't get time due to an engine problem.

=== Feature race ===
Pos.	No.	Driver	Team	Laps	Time/Retired	Grid	Points
1	20	(Spain) Roldán Rodríguez	Piquet GP	34	1:06:23.303	1	10+2
2	8	(Japan) Kamui Kobayashi	DAMS	34	+0.632	2	8+1
3	1	(Japan) Sakon Yamamoto	ART Grand Prix	34	+3.971	4	6
4	11	(Spain) Javier Villa	Super Nova Racing	34	+7.235	3	5
5	5	(Russia) Vitaly Petrov	Barwa International Campos Team	34	+9.405	6	4
6	19	(New Zealand) Earl Bamber	My Team Qi-Meritus Mahara	34	+11.675	9	3
7	27	(New Zealand) Chris van der Drift	Trident Racing	34	+15.546	16	2
8	16	(Italy) Davide Valsecchi	Durango	34	+16.178	8	1
9	7	(Belgium) Jérôme d'Ambrosio	DAMS	34	+16.495	7	
10	9	(Netherlands) Giedo van der Garde	GFH Team iSport	34	+16.811	5	
11	17	(Brazil) Carlos Iaconelli	Durango	34	+20.604	22	
12	21	(Brazil) Diego Nunes	Piquet GP	34	+21.618	12	
13	26	(Italy) Giacomo Ricci	Trident Racing	34	+23.109	20	
14	18	(Malaysia) Alex Yoong	My Team Qi-Meritus Mahara	34	+25.892	23	
15	10	(Bahrain) Hamad Al Fardan	GFH Team iSport	34	+26.419	14	
16	22	(Romania) Michael Herck	DPR	34	+26.821	19	
17	2	(France) Nelson Philippe	ART Grand Prix	33	+1 lap	13	
Ret	25	(Italy) Luca Filippi	BCN Competición	24	Retired	10	
Ret	23	(Japan) Yuhi Sekiguchi	DPR	24	Retired	17	
Ret	15	(United States) Kevin Chen	Fisichella Motor Sport International	24	Retired	25	
Ret	24	(Japan) Hiroki Yoshimoto	BCN Competición	20	Retired	21	
Ret	14	(United Arab Emirates) Andreas Zuber	Fisichella Motor Sport International	19	Retired	26	
Ret	12	(United Kingdom) James Jakes	Super Nova Racing	19	Retired	24	
Ret	4	(Finland) Mika Mäki	Trust Team Arden	10	Retired	15	
Ret	6	(Mexico) Sergio Pérez	Barwa International Campos Team	10	Retired	18	
Ret	3	(Brazil) Luiz Razia	Trust Team Arden	3	Retired	11	

=== Sprint race ===
Pos.	No.	Driver	Team	Laps	Time/Retired	Grid	Points
1	16	(Italy) Davide Valsecchi	Durango	23	41:44.065	1	6
2	19	(New Zealand) Earl Bamber	My Team Qi-Meritus Mahara	23	+4.809	3	5
3	11	(Spain) Javier Villa	Super Nova Racing	23	+10.189	5	4+1
4	27	(New Zealand) Chris van der Drift	Trident Racing	23	+17.700	2	3
5	7	(Belgium) Jérôme d'Ambrosio	DAMS	23	+18.383	9	2
6	20	(Spain) Roldán Rodríguez	Piquet GP	23	+18.810	8	1
7	6	(Mexico) Sergio Pérez	Barwa International Campos Team	23	+19.356	24	
8	24	(Japan) Hiroki Yoshimoto	BCN Competición	23	+31.563	19	
9	18	(Malaysia) Alex Yoong	My Team Qi-Meritus Mahara	23	+32.982	13	
10	4	(Finland) Mika Mäki	Trust Team Arden	23	+33.587	22	
11	12	(United Kingdom) James Jakes	Super Nova Racing	23	+34.608	21	
12	23	(Japan) Yuhi Sekiguchi	DPR	23	+38.078	23^{2}	
13	2	(France) Nelson Philippe	ART Grand Prix	23	+40.428	16	
14	1	(Japan) Sakon Yamamoto	ART Grand Prix	23	+1:05.498	6	
15	15	(United States) Kevin Chen	Fisichella Motor Sport International	23	+1:39.742	18	
16	22	(Romania) Michael Herck	DPR	22	+1 lap	15	
17	3	(Brazil) Luiz Razia	Trust Team Arden	21	+2 laps	25	
Ret	5	(Russia) Vitaly Petrov	Barwa International Campos Team	19	Retired	4	
Ret	8	(Japan) Kamui Kobayashi	DAMS	16	Retired	7	
Ret	10	(Bahrain) Hamad Al Fardan	GFH Team iSport	11	Retired	14	
Ret	25	(Italy) Luca Filippi	BCN Competición	10	Retired	17	
Ret	17	(Brazil) Carlos Iaconelli	Durango	1	Retired	10	
Ret	26	(Italy) Giacomo Ricci	Trident Racing	1	Retired	12	
Ret	21	(Brazil) Diego Nunes	Piquet GP	0	Retired	11	
Ret	14	(United Arab Emirates) Andreas Zuber	Fisichella Motor Sport International	0	Retired	20	
DNS	9	(Netherlands) Giedo van der Garde	GFH Team iSport	0	Did not start^{3}		

Notes

- ^2 – Yuhi Sekiguchi was given a five-place grid penalty for causing a collision with Luca Filippi in the feature race.
- ^3 – Giedo van der Garde didn't leave because she attended on saturday night to fly back to Europe to attend the awards ceremony.

== Standings after the event ==
Drivers' Championship standings

Pos.	Driver	Points
1	(Spain) Roldán Rodríguez	13
2	(Spain) Javier Villa	10
3	(Japan) Kamui Kobayashi	9
4	(New Zealand) Earl Bamber	8
5	(Italy) Davide Valsecchi	7

Teams' Championship standings

Pos.	Team	Points
1	(Brazil) Piquet GP	13
2	(France) DAMS	11
3	(United Kingdom) Super Nova Racing	10
4	(Malaysia) My Team Qi-Meritus Mahara	8
5	(Italy) Durango	7

- Note: Only the top five positions are included for both sets of standings.

== Notes ==
Previous round: 2008 UAE 2nd GP2 Asia Series round	GP2 Asia Series Championship; 2008–09 season	Next round: 2008 UAE 3rd GP2 Asia Series round
Previous round: None	Chinese GP2 Asia Series round	Next round: None
