= BCN Competición =

(Spain) BCN Competición
- Founded: 2002
- Folded: 2008
- Base: Barcelona, Spain
- Team principal(s): Enrique Scalabroni; Jaime Pintanel
- Former series: A1 Grand Prix; Formula 3000; World Series by Nissan; Euro Formula 3000; GP2 Asia Series; GP2 Series

BCN Competición was a Spanish motorsport team active in the GP2 Series and the International Formula 3000. The team, owned by Enrique Scalabroni and Jaime Pintanel, was founded in 2002. Due to financial problems, the team was sold to Tiago Monteiro and José Guedes at the end of November 2008 and has since competed under the name Ocean Racing Technology.

BCN Competición was the only GP2 team not to win a single race; it achieved only two podiums in four years. Contributing factors were BCN Competición's frequent use of a rotating selection of paying drivers.

== History ==
The BCN Competición project began at the 2002 San Marino Grand Prix, when Enrique Scalabroni and Jaime Pintanel (who had known each other since 1993) considered the idea of setting up a team in Formula 3000. In those days, Scalabroni was immersed in the mission to convert Asiatech into a Formula One team and his plan was for the 3000 team to be a junior team of this. Asiatech did not succeed in this conversion, but the aforementioned junior team became a new Barcelona team.

== Racing history ==
=== Formula Nissan ===
The team was created in 2002 and their debut season was in Formula Nissan with Andrea Belicchi and Carlos Martin as drivers.

=== Formula 3000 ===
For 2003, BCN stepped up to International Formula 3000. In their first year on that series, they were known as a rent-a-drive team due to the high number of drivers who passed through the team that year (drivers such as Will Langhorne, Alessandro Piccolo, Ferdinando Monfardini and Rob Nguyen). That year, it had many financial difficulties and virtually did not have a big sponsor.

In 2004, the situation got better — the team ran veteran driver Enrico Toccacelo alongside Argentine youngster Esteban Guerrieri. With the same drivers throughout the year, the team found the pace to reach second place in the Teams' Championship, with 84 points (56 from Toccacelo and 28 from Guerrieri) just behind the Arden International team.

=== GP2 Series ===
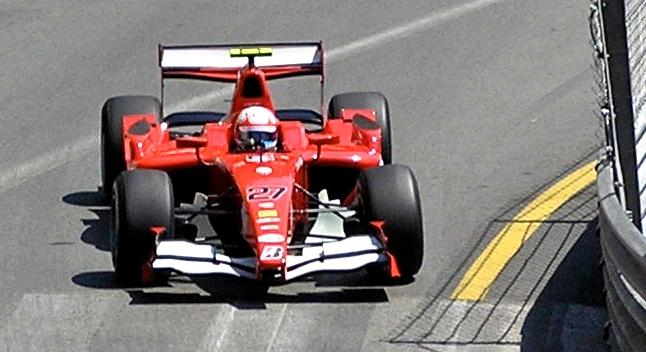
Miloš Pavlović driving for BCN at the 2008 Monaco GP2 Series round

BCN was considered a threat for the new GP2 Series, alongside other top teams like Super Nova Racing and Arden. In 2005, the team hired Venezuelan star Ernesto Viso and Japanese Hiroki Yoshimoto, anticipating at least, some victories and many points. However, compared to the previous year, 2005 was a great disappointment. BCN could not threaten teams like Arden and ART Grand Prix. The team ended the year with 35 points and 9th place in the Teams' Championship.

In 2006, Scalabroni's team continued as a midfield team, scoring points occasionally. Yoshimoto continued with the team, first paired with Timo Glock (who brought DHL as sponsor), but the German driver was not comfortable with the team and moved to iSport International at mid-season. Glock's place was filled by Luca Filippi. The team again finished 9th in the Teams' Championship, with 22 points.

For 2007 BCN hired a pair of young Asian talents - Super Aguri F1 test driver Sakon Yamamoto and 2006 German F3 Cup champion Ho-Pin Tung. When Yamamoto stepped up to F1, his place was taken by Finnish driver Markus Niemelä. However, the team was unsuccessful, scoring just four points all year. 2008 was little better, with a succession of drivers competing for the team amidst reported financial troubles. A fourth place for Adrián Vallés at Monaco was the only points-scoring run.

=== GP2 Asia Series ===
In the GP2 Asia series, which was held for the first time in 2008, the team started with Miloš Pavlović and Jason Tahincioğlu. The 2008 season ended in twelfth place in the team standings with only 6 points. In the 2008/2009 season, Hiroki Yoshimoto and Luca Filippi drove for BCN in the Asia Series. Due to the sale of BCN Competición, the team took part in a GP2 race for the last time in Shanghai.

=== A1 Grand Prix ===
In 2005-06, the team was involved in the new A1 Grand Prix series managing the A1 Team South Africa car, however DAMS took over the team for 2006-07.

== Complete series results ==
=== GP2 Series ===
GP2 Series Results
Year	Chassis	Engine	Tyres	Drivers	Races	Wins	Poles	F.L.	Points	D.C.	T.C.
2005	Dallara; GP2/05	Mecachrome; V8108 V8	B	(Venezuela) Ernesto Viso	22	0	0	1	21	11th	9th
2005	Dallara; GP2/05	Mecachrome; V8108 V8	B	(Japan) Hiroki Yoshimoto	22	0	0	1	14	16th	9th
2006	Dallara; GP2/05	Mecachrome; V8108 V8	B	(Japan) Hiroki Yoshimoto	21	0	0	0	12	15th	9th
2006	Dallara; GP2/05	Mecachrome; V8108 V8	B	(Germany) Timo Glock†	9	0	0	0	5	4th†	9th
2006	Dallara; GP2/05	Mecachrome; V8108 V8	B	(Italy) Luca Filippi†	12	0	0	0	7	19th†	9th
2007	Dallara; GP2/05	Mecachrome; V8108 V8	B	(Japan) Sakon Yamamoto	11	0	0	0	0	30th	13th
2007	Dallara; GP2/05	Mecachrome; V8108 V8	B	(Finland) Markus Niemelä	7	0	0	0	0	31st	13th
2007	Dallara; GP2/05	Mecachrome; V8108 V8	B	(Finland) Henri Karjalainen	2	0	0	0	0	NC	13th
2007	Dallara; GP2/05	Mecachrome; V8108 V8	B	(China) Ho-Pin Tung	21	0	0	0	4	23rd	13th
2008	Dallara; GP2/08	Mecachrome; V8108 V8	B	(Italy) Paolo Nocera	2	0	0	0	0	34th	12th
2008	Dallara; GP2/08	Mecachrome; V8108 V8	B	(Spain) Adrián Vallés†	16	0	0	0	5	21st†	12th
2008	Dallara; GP2/08	Mecachrome; V8108 V8	B	(Serbia) Miloš Pavlović	3	0	0	0	0	32nd	12th
2008	Dallara; GP2/08	Mecachrome; V8108 V8	B	(Brazil) Carlos Iaconelli	13	0	0	0	0	29th	12th

† These drivers raced for more than one team during the season. Their final position includes results for all teams.

=== In detail ===
(key) (Races in bold indicate pole position) (Races in italics indicate fastest lap)

Year	Chassis Engine Tyres	Drivers	1	2	3	4	5	6	7	8	9	10	11	12	13	14	15	16	17	18	19	20	21	22	23	T.C.	Points
2005	GP2/05; Renault; **B**		SMR; FEA	SMR; SPR	CAT; FEA	CAT; SPR	MON; FEA	NÜR; FEA	NÜR; SPR	MAG; FEA	MAG; SPR	SIL; FEA	SIL; SPR	HOC; FEA	HOC; SPR	HUN; FEA	HUN; SPR	IST; FEA	IST; SPR	MNZ; FEA	MNZ; SPR	SPA; FEA	SPA; SPR	BHR; FEA	BHR; SPR	9th	35
2005	GP2/05; Renault; **B**	(Venezuela) Ernesto Viso	10	DNS	Ret	Ret	DSQ	Ret	11	11	8	15	13	DSQ	12	6	Ret	14	12	Ret	Ret	2	3	8	2	9th	35
2005	GP2/05; Renault; **B**	(Japan) Hiroki Yoshimoto	Ret	9	Ret	17	DNS	11	Ret	6	2	13	Ret	12	Ret	13	17	8	10	10	16	Ret	17	7	6	9th	35
2006	GP2/05; Renault; **B**		VAL; FEA	VAL; SPR	SMR; FEA	SMR; SPR	NÜR; FEA	NÜR; SPR	CAT; FEA	CAT; SPR	MON; FEA	SIL; FEA	SIL; SPR	MAG; FEA	MAG; SPR	HOC; FEA	HOC; SPR	HUN; FEA	HUN; SPR	IST; FEA	IST; SPR	MNZ; FEA	MNZ; SPR			9th	22
2006	GP2/05; Renault; **B**	(Japan) Hiroki Yoshimoto	Ret	12	8	3	8	4	Ret	Ret	Ret	Ret	17†	9	Ret	23†	Ret	Ret	Ret	Ret	19	8	5			9th	22
2006	GP2/05; Renault; **B**	(Germany) Timo Glock	16	8	7	4	17	Ret	11	10	Ret															9th	22
2006	GP2/05; Renault; **B**	(Italy) Luca Filippi										Ret	9	Ret	Ret	21	16	12	Ret	10	Ret	4	7			9th	22
2007	GP2/05; Renault; **B**		BHR; FEA	BHR; SPR	CAT; FEA	CAT; SPR	MON; FEA	MAG; FEA	MAG; SPR	SIL; FEA	SIL; SPR	NÜR; FEA	NÜR; SPR	HUN; FEA	HUN; SPR	IST; FEA	IST; SPR	MNZ; FEA	MNZ; SPR	SPA; FEA	SPA; SPR	VAL; FEA	VAL; SPR			13th	4
2007	GP2/05; Renault; **B**	(Japan) Sakon Yamamoto	11	14	9	18†	Ret	11	13	16	Ret	13	11													13th	4
2007	GP2/05; Renault; **B**	(Finland) Markus Niemelä												Ret	DNS			9	11	11	Ret	14	Ret			13th	4
2007	GP2/05; Renault; **B**	(Finland) Henri Karjalainen														Ret	Ret									13th	4
2007	GP2/05; Renault; **B**	(China) Ho-Pin Tung	15	Ret	11	Ret	13	14	17	17	15	16	22†	9	Ret	9	9	Ret	16†	8	4	11	11			13th	4
2008	GP2/08; Renault; **B**		CAT; FEA	CAT; SPR	IST; FEA	IST; SPR	MON; FEA	MON; FEA	MAG; FEA	MAG; SPR	SIL; FEA	SIL; SPR	HOC; FEA	HOC; SPR	HUN; FEA	HUN; SPR	VAL; FEA	VAL; SPR	SPA; FEA	SPA; SPR	MNZ; FEA	MNZ; SPR				12th	5
2008	GP2/08; Renault; **B**	(Italy) Paolo Nocera	17	Ret																						12th	5
2008	GP2/08; Renault; **B**	(Spain) Adrián Vallés			10	Ret	4	16	15	12	22	14†	15	Ret	Ret	19	11	Ret	13	13	WD	WD				12th	5
2008	GP2/08; Renault; **B**	(Serbia) Miloš Pavlović	DNS	12	Ret	16	DNS	DNS																		12th	5
2008	GP2/08; Renault; **B**	(Brazil) Carlos Iaconelli							16	13	DNS	Ret	16	17	Ret	Ret	13	11	Ret	12	14	14				12th	5

=== Formula Nissan 2000 ===
Formula Nissan 2000 Results
Year	Car	Drivers	Races	Wins	Poles	F.L.	Points	D.C.	T.C.
2002	Dallara WSL3-Nissan	(Italy) Andrea Belicchi	12	1	2	0	105	5th	6th
2002	Dallara WSL3-Nissan	(Spain) Carlos Martin	7	0	0	0	4	16th	6th

=== International Formula 3000 ===
International Formula 3000 Results
Year	Car	Drivers	Races	Wins	Poles	F.L.	Points	D.C.	T.C.
2003	Lola B02/50-Zytek	(Australia) Rob Nguyen	3	0	0	0	5	15th	9th
2003	Lola B02/50-Zytek	(Italy) Valerio Scassellati	4	0	0	0	0	NC	9th
2003	Lola B02/50-Zytek	(Italy) Alessandro Piccolo	4	0	0	0	0	NC	9th
2003	Lola B02/50-Zytek	(United States) Will Langhorne	5	0	0	0	0	NC	9th
2003	Lola B02/50-Zytek	(United Kingdom) Marc Hynes	1	0	0	0	0	NC	9th
2003	Lola B02/50-Zytek	(Italy) Giovanni Berton	1	0	0	0	0	NC	9th
2003	Lola B02/50-Zytek	(Italy) Ferdinando Monfardini	2	0	0	0	0	NC	9th
2004	Lola B02/50-Zytek	(Italy) Enrico Toccacelo	10	1	1	1	56	**2nd**	**2nd**
2004	Lola B02/50-Zytek	(Argentina) Esteban Guerrieri	10	0	0	0	28	6th	**2nd**

=== Spanish Formula Three ===
Spanish Formula Three Results
Year	Car	Drivers	Races	Wins	Poles	F.L.	Points	D.C.	T.C.
2004	Dallara F399-Toyota	(Argentina) Matias Milla	12	0	0	0	6	15th	9th

=== Italian Formula 3000 ===
Italian Formula 3000 Results
Year	Car	Drivers	Races	Wins	Poles	F.L.	Points	D.C.	T.C.
2005	Lola B02/50-Zytek	(Argentina) Matías Russo	3	0	0	0	3	21st	6th
2005	Lola B02/50-Zytek	(Italy) Raffaele Giammaria	2	0	0	0	13	10th	6th
2005	Lola B02/50-Zytek	(Italy) Matteo Grassotto	1	0	0	0	0	NC	6th
2005	Lola B02/50-Zytek	(Italy) Matteo Cressoni	3	0	0	0	9	12th	6th

=== A1 Grand Prix ===
A1 Grand Prix Results
Year	Car	Team	Wins	Poles	F.L.	Points	T.C.
2005–06	Lola A1GP-Zytek	A1 Team South Africa	0	0	0	20	17th

=== GP2 Asia Series ===
GP2 Asia Series Results
Year	Car	Drivers	Races	Wins	Poles	F.L.	Points	D.C.	T.C.
2008	Dallara GP2/08-Mecachrome	(Serbia) Miloš Pavlović	10	0	0	0	6	16th	12th
2008	Dallara GP2/08-Mecachrome	(Turkey) Jason Tahincioglu	10	0	0	0	0	22nd	12th
2008-09	Dallara GP2/08-Mecachrome	(Japan) Hiroki Yoshimoto	2	0	0	0	0	24th	11th
2008-09	Dallara GP2/08-Mecachrome	(Italy) Luca Filippi	2	0	0	0	0	-	11th

=== In detail ===
(key) (Races in bold indicate pole position) (Races in italics indicate fastest lap)

Year	Chassis Engine Tyres	Drivers	1	2	3	4	5	6	7	8	9	10	11	12	T.C.	Points
2008	GP2/05; Renault; **B**		DUB1; FEA	DUB1; SPR	SEN; FEA	SEN; SPR	SEP; FEA	SEP; SPR	BHR; FEA	BHR; SPR	DUB2; FEA	DUB2; SPR			12th	6
2008	GP2/05; Renault; **B**	(Serbia) Miloš Pavlović	10	14	6	Ret	7	12	19	15	8	Ret			12th	6
2008	GP2/05; Renault; **B**	(Turkey) Jason Tahincioglu	19	16	Ret	17	12	Ret	17	13	9	8			12th	6
2008–09*	GP2/05; Renault; **B**		SHI; FEA	SHI; SPR	DUB3; FEA	DUB3; SPR	BHR1; FEA	BHR1; SPR	LSL; FEA	LSL; SPR	SEP; FEA	SEP; SPR	BHR2; FEA	BHR2; SPR	14th	0
2008–09*	GP2/05; Renault; **B**	(Japan) Hiroki Yoshimoto	Ret	8											14th	0
2008–09*	GP2/05; Renault; **B**	(Italy) Luca Filippi	Ret	Ret											14th	0

- * Team was known as BCN Competición at round one in Shanghai, before Tiago Monteiro bought over the team's assets and renamed it as Ocean Racing Technology.
