= Ocean Racing Technology =

Motor racing team

(Portugal) Ocean Racing Technology
- Founded: 2008
- Folded: 2012
- Base: Perafita, Portugal
- Team principal(s): Tiago Monteiro; José Guedes
- Former series: GP2 Asia Series; GP2 Series; GP3 Series
- Noted drivers: (New Zealand) Brendon Hartley (India) Karun Chandhok (United Kingdom) Max Chilton
- Website: http://www.oceanracingtech.com/

Ocean Racing Technology (ORT) was a racing team that competed in GP2 Series, GP2 Asia Series and GP3 Series between 2009 and 2012. ORT were formed after former Formula One driver Tiago Monteiro and José Guedes acquired the BCN Competición team. Several future Formula One drivers, such as Brendon Hartley and Max Chilton, competed for the team.

== History ==
In late November 2008, a company led by former Formula One driver Tiago Monteiro acquired the BCN Competición GP2 team. The team were relocated to Portugal.

== Racing history ==
=== GP2 Series ===
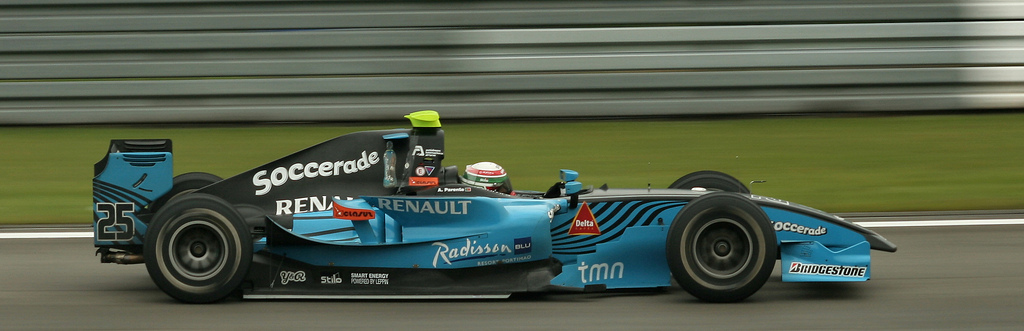
Álvaro Parente driving for Ocean Racing Technology at the Nurburgring in 2009

In the 2009 season, drivers were Álvaro Parente and Karun Chandhok. Parente won the first race for the team at the 2009 Belgian Feature Race, in a round where he also got pole position and fastest lap and was 8th in the final Championship standings. ORT finished the Teams' Championship in 9th, but only two points behind 5th-place finisher iSport International.

For 2010, Ocean recruited Max Chilton and Fabio Leimer, with Leimer taking the team's second win, but the team slipped back to twelfth overall in the standings.

The following year, Ocean hired Kevin Mirocha (who was later replaced by Brendon Hartley) and Johnny Cecotto Jr.: Hartley scored the team's only points with a fifth-place finish at Spa-Francorchamps, this poor showing again resulting in a twelfth-place teams' championship result.

For the 2012 season, Ocean signed Nigel Melker, and Jon Lancaster, the latter of whom was swiftly dropped when he ran out of money. He was replaced by Hartley for two rounds of the championship, before Victor Guerin took the seat for the remainder of the season. Melker scored 25 points under the revised system, raising Ocean's performance to eleventh overall following the Coloni team's exclusion from the championship.

At the end of 2012, its owner Tiago Monteiro reported that the Government of Portugal owed the project around €6 million and that without that money they would not be able to continue in the competition. On January 16, 2013, Hilmer Motorsport was announced as a replacement of the team in the GP2 Series.

=== GP2 Asia Series ===
Yelmer Buurman and Fabrizio Crestani drove for the team in the 2008-09 GP2 Asia Series season, replacing BCN drivers Yoshimoto and Luca Filippi who competed in the first round of the championship.

=== GP3 Series ===
In 2012 they entered the GP3 Series shortly before the start of the season, replacing Tech 1 Racing, they finished seventh in the championship with 56 points thanks to the results of Kevin Ceccon.

== Complete series results ==
=== GP2 Series ===
Year	Chassis	Engine	Tyres	Drivers	Races	Wins	Poles	F.L.	Points	D.C.	T.C.
2009	Dallara; GP2/08	Mecachrome; V8108 V8	B	(India) Karun Chandhok	20	0	0	0	10	18th	9th
2009	Dallara; GP2/08	Mecachrome; V8108 V8	B	(Portugal) Álvaro Parente	20	1	1	1	30	8th	9th
2010	Dallara; GP2/08	Mecachrome; V8108 V8	B	(United Kingdom) Max Chilton	20	0	0	0	3	25th	12th
2010	Dallara; GP2/08	Mecachrome; V8108 V8	B	(Switzerland) Fabio Leimer	19	1	0	1	8	19th	12th
2011	Dallara; GP2/11	Mecachrome; V8108 V8	P	(Germany) Kevin Mirocha	12	0	0	0	0	22nd	12th
2011	Dallara; GP2/11	Mecachrome; V8108 V8	P	(New Zealand) Brendon Hartley	4	0	0	0	4	19th	12th
2011	Dallara; GP2/11	Mecachrome; V8108 V8	P	(Venezuela) Johnny Cecotto Jr.	18	0	0	0	0	24th	12th
2012	Dallara; GP2/11	Mecachrome; V8108 V8	P	(United Kingdom) Jon Lancaster	2	0	0	0	0	34th	11th
2012	Dallara; GP2/11	Mecachrome; V8108 V8	P	(New Zealand) Brendon Hartley	4	0	0	0	1	25th	11th
2012	Dallara; GP2/11	Mecachrome; V8108 V8	P	(Brazil) Victor Guerin	17	0	0	0	0	30th	11th
2012	Dallara; GP2/11	Mecachrome; V8108 V8	P	(Netherlands) Nigel Melker	23	0	0	0	25	19th	11th

=== In detail ===
(key) (Races in bold indicate pole position) (Races in italics indicate fastest lap)

Year	Chassis Engine Tyres	Drivers	1	2	3	4	5	6	7	8	9	10	11	12	13	14	15	16	17	18	19	20	21	22	23	24	T.C.	Points
2009	GP2/08; Renault; **B**		CAT; FEA	CAT; SPR	MON; FEA	MON; FEA	IST; FEA	IST; SPR	SIL; FEA	SIL; SPR	NÜR; FEA	NÜR; SPR	HUN; FEA	HUN; SPR	VAL; FEA	VAL; SPR	SPA; FEA	SPA; SPR	MNZ; FEA	MNZ; SPR	ALG; FEA	ALG; SPR					9th	40
2009	GP2/08; Renault; **B**	(India) Karun Chandhok	Ret	Ret	7	Ret	13	14	6	3	11	Ret	17†	10	Ret	6	Ret	7	19†	12	Ret	13					9th	40
2009	GP2/08; Renault; **B**	(Portugal) Álvaro Parente	Ret	11	Ret	Ret	Ret	10	Ret	11	6	2	9	6	4	Ret	**1**	Ret	11	Ret	Ret	4					9th	40
2010	GP2/08; Renault; **B**		CAT; FEA	CAT; SPR	MON; FEA	MON; SPR	IST; FEA	IST; SPR	VAL; FEA	VAL; SPR	SIL; FEA	SIL; SPR	HOC; FEA	HOC; SPR	HUN; FEA	HUN; SPR	SPA; FEA	SPA; SPR	MNZ; FEA	MNZ; SPR	YMC; FEA	YMC; SPR					12th	11
2010	GP2/08; Renault; **B**	(United Kingdom) Max Chilton	18	16	Ret	14	9	11	Ret	11	19	19	19	16	17	16	17	11	8	5	12	12					12th	11
2010	GP2/08; Renault; **B**	(Switzerland) Fabio Leimer	8	1	Ret	17	13	15	Ret	Ret	17	13	21†	Ret	Ret	11	12	Ret	Ret	DNS	Ret	15					12th	11
2011	GP2/11; Mecachrome; **P**		IST; FEA	IST; SPR	CAT; FEA	CAT; SPR	MON; FEA	MON; SPR	VAL; FEA	VAL; SPR	SIL; FEA	SIL; SPR	NÜR; FEA	NÜR; SPR	HUN; FEA	HUN; SPR	SPA; FEA	SPA; SPR	MNZ; FEA	MNZ; SPR							12th	4
2011	GP2/11; Mecachrome; **P**	(Germany) Kevin Mirocha	15†	19	21†	16	10	Ret	12	8	DNS	DNS	Ret	13	14	8											12th	4
2011	GP2/11; Mecachrome; **P**	(New Zealand) Brendon Hartley															5	9	22	20							12th	4
2011	GP2/11; Mecachrome; **P**	(Venezuela) Johnny Cecotto Jr.	Ret	13	14	13	Ret	17	14	17	12	Ret	10	Ret	Ret	Ret	11	8	17	15							12th	4
2012	GP2/11; Mecachrome; **P**		SEP; FEA	SEP; SPR	BHR1; FEA	BHR1; SPR	BHR2; FEA	BHR2; SPR	CAT; FEA	CAT; SPR	MON; FEA	MON; SPR	VAL; FEA	VAL; SPR	SIL; FEA	SIL; SPR	HOC; FEA	HOC; SPR	HUN; FEA	HUN; SPR	SPA; FEA	SPA; SPR	MNZ; FEA	MNZ; SPR	MRN; FEA	MRN; SPR	11th	26
2012	GP2/11; Mecachrome; **P**	(United Kingdom) Jon Lancaster	Ret	17																							11th	26
2012	GP2/11; Mecachrome; **P**	(New Zealand) Brendon Hartley			10	Ret	13	16																			11th	26
2012	GP2/11; Mecachrome; **P**	(Brazil) Victor Guerin							19	21	16	Ret	17	18	17	DNS	Ret	23	21	23	Ret	18	23	Ret	Ret	13	11th	26
2012	GP2/11; Mecachrome; **P**	(Netherlands) Nigel Melker	16	14	20†	18	19	11	14	24	Ret	12	Ret	13	4	6	6	8	14	18	Ret	DNS	11	Ret	12	12	11th	26

=== GP2 Final ===
(key) (Races in bold indicate pole position) (Races in italics indicate fastest lap)

Year	Chassis Engine Tyres	Drivers	1	2	T.C.	Points
2011	GP2/11; Mecachrome; **P**		YMC; FEA	YMC; SPR	7th	2
2011	GP2/11; Mecachrome; **P**	(France) Nicolas Marroc	14	22	7th	2
2011	GP2/11; Mecachrome; **P**	(Portugal) António Félix da Costa	7	13	7th	2

=== GP2 Asia Series ===
GP2 Asia Series Results
Year	Car	Drivers	Races	Wins	Poles	F.L.	Points	D.C.	T.C.
2008	Dallara GP2/08-Mecachrome	(Serbia) Miloš Pavlović	10	0	0	0	6	16th	12th
2008	Dallara GP2/08-Mecachrome	(Turkey) Jason Tahincioglu	10	0	0	0	0	22nd	12th
2008-09	Dallara GP2/08-Mecachrome	(Netherlands) Yelmer Buurman	6	0	0	0	4	19th	11th
2008-09	Dallara GP2/08-Mecachrome	(India) Karun Chandhok	2	0	0	0	0	26th	11th
2008-09	Dallara GP2/08-Mecachrome	(Italy) Fabrizio Crestani	9	0	0	0	0	28th	11th
2009-10	Dallara GP2/08-Mecachrome	(United States) Alexander Rossi†	2	0	0	0	8	9th†	9th
2009-10	Dallara GP2/08-Mecachrome	(United Kingdom) Max Chilton†	2	0	0	0	2	18th†	9th
2009-10	Dallara GP2/08-Mecachrome	(Netherlands) Yelmer Buurman	4	0	0	0	0	21st	9th
2009-10	Dallara GP2/08-Mecachrome	(Switzerland) Fabio Leimer	7	0	0	0	0	31st	9th
2011	Dallara GP2/11-Mecachrome	(Italy) Andrea Caldarelli	4	0	0	0	0	21st	12th
2011	Dallara GP2/11-Mecachrome	(United Kingdom) Oliver Turvey	4	0	0	0	0	16th	12th

† These drivers raced for more than one team during the season. Their final position includes results for all teams.

=== In detail ===
(key) (Races in bold indicate pole position) (Races in italics indicate fastest lap)

Year	Chassis Engine Tyres	Drivers	1	2	3	4	5	6	7	8	9	10	11	12	T.C.	Points
2008–09*	GP2/05; Renault; **B**		SHI; FEA	SHI; SPR	DUB3; FEA	DUB3; SPR	BHR1; FEA	BHR1; SPR	LSL; FEA	LSL; SPR	SEP; FEA	SEP; SPR	BHR2; FEA	BHR2; SPR	11th	4
2008–09*	GP2/05; Renault; **B**	(Netherlands) Yelmer Buurman			Ret	C	Ret	13	Ret	DNS	5	11			11th	4
2008–09*	GP2/05; Renault; **B**	(India) Karun Chandhok											9	Ret	11th	4
2008–09*	GP2/05; Renault; **B**	(Italy) Fabrizio Crestani			14	C	Ret	17	10	21	15	16	18	15	11th	4
2009–10	GP2/05; Renault; **B**		YMC1; FEA	YMC1; SPR	YMC2; FEA	YMC2; SPR	BHR1; FEA	BHR1; SPR	BHR2; FEA	BHR2; SPR					9th	9
2009–10	GP2/05; Renault; **B**	(United States) Alexander Rossi	4	5											9th	9
2009–10	GP2/05; Renault; **B**	(United Kingdom) Max Chilton			8	6									9th	9
2009–10	GP2/05; Renault; **B**	(Netherlands) Yelmer Buurman					12	10	13	7					9th	9
2009–10	GP2/05; Renault; **B**	(Switzerland) Fabio Leimer	17	Ret	Ret	Ret	20	15	Ret	DNS					9th	9
2011	GP2/11; Mecachrome; **P**		YMC; FEA	YMC; SPR	IMO; FEA	IMO; SPR									12th	0
2011	GP2/11; Mecachrome; **P**	(United Kingdom) Oliver Turvey	18	19	14	8									12th	0
2011	GP2/11; Mecachrome; **P**	(Italy) Andrea Caldarelli	16	11	17	12									12th	0

- * Team was known as BCN Competición at round one in Shanghai, before Tiago Monteiro bought over the team's assets and renamed it as Ocean Racing Technology.

=== GP3 Series ===
GP3 Series Results
Year	Car	Drivers	Races	Wins	Poles	F.L.	Points	D.C.	T.C.
2012	GP3/10-Renault	(Spain) Carmen Jordá	16	0	0	0	0	28th	7th
2012	GP3/10-Renault	(Italy) Kevin Ceccon	16	0	0	2	56	9th	7th
2012	GP3/10-Renault	(Republic of Ireland) Robert Cregan	16	0	0	0	0	22nd	7th

=== In detail ===
(key) (Races in bold indicate pole position) (Races in italics indicate fastest lap)

Year	Chassis Engine Tyres	Drivers	1	2	3	4	5	6	7	8	9	10	11	12	13	14	15	16	T.C.	Points
2012	GP3/10; Renault; **P**		CAT; FEA	CAT; SPR	MON; FEA	MON; SPR	VAL; FEA	VAL; SPR	SIL; FEA	SIL; SPR	HOC; FEA	HOC; SPR	HUN; FEA	HUN; SPR	SPA; FEA	SPA; SPR	MNZ; FEA	MNZ; SPR	7th	56
2012	GP3/10; Renault; **P**	(Spain) Carmen Jordá	20	21	Ret	22	13	Ret	DNQ	DNQ	20	Ret	24†	Ret	26	23	21	19	7th	56
2012	GP3/10; Renault; **P**	(Italy) Kevin Ceccon	Ret	10	3	6	7	4	8	7	17	15	4	8	12	20	13	9	7th	56
2012	GP3/10; Renault; **P**	(Republic of Ireland) Robert Cregan	15	Ret	18	11	15	13	20	15	11	NC	21	14	21	DNS	20	17	7th	56
