= Ahmed Al Fardan =

Ahmed Al Fardan (أحمد الفردان)
- Nationality: (Bahrain) Bahraini
- Born: Manama, Bahrain

Previous series
- Middle East Rally Championship

Ahmed Al-Fardan is a Bahraini former rally driver who has competed in national and regional rallying championships in the Middle East. He is best known for his participation in the Bahrain National Rally Championship and events organised under the Bahrain Motor Federation (BMF). He is the father of Hamad Al Fardan, the first Bahraini to drive at GP2 series level.

== Rally career ==
Al Fardan's active racing years coincided with the growth of international motorsport across the Middle East. He was a regular participant in regional events such as the Bahrain International Rally and other rounds of the FIA Middle East Rally Championship. His experience in the desert-based rallying circuits of the Gulf helped establish Bahrain's presence in the regional motorsport community long before the country hosted its first Formula 1 Grand Prix in 2004.

== Post-racing career ==
Following his retirement from active competition Al Fardan transitioned into a managerial and advisory role. He was instrumental in managing the career of his son, Hamad Al Fardan, guiding him through various international open-wheel categories including Formula BMW Asia, British Formula 3, and the GP2 Asia Series.

Al Fardan was also known for his involvement with the Gulf Finance House (GFH) racing initiatives, which sponsored Bahraini drivers on the international stage to bridge the gap between regional racing and global platforms like Formula 1.

== See also ==
- Hamad Al Fardan
- Mohammed Ben Sulayem
- Nasser Al-Attiyah
