= 2009 Formula V6 Asia Championship =

Motor racing competition

2009 Formula V6 Asia

Seasons
- ← 2008 none →

The 2009 Formula V6 Asia season was the fourth and final season of the Formula V6 Asia championship. The season started on the weekend of May 29–31 at Sepang, but the series was eventually cancelled after four races, making Hamad Al Fardan, who won all four races, the season champion.

== Drivers and teams ==
Team	No	Driver	Rounds
(Hong Kong) Champ Motorsport	2	(Taiwan) Kevin Chen	1
(Hong Kong) Champ Motorsport	7	(Hong Kong) Geoffrey Kwong	2
(Hong Kong) Champ Motorsport	27	(Macau) Michael Ho	All
(Hong Kong) Dyan Ten Motorsport	5	(Bahrain) Hamad Al Fardan	All
(Hong Kong) Dyan Ten Motorsport	8	(Singapore) Ro Charlz	All
(Hong Kong) Dyan Ten Motorsport	31	(Singapore) Hafiz Koh	1
(Hong Kong) Dyan Ten Motorsport	33	(Australia) Mark Williamson	2
(Sri Lanka) Dilango Racing	6	(Sri Lanka) Dilantha Malagamuwa	1
(Sri Lanka) Dilango Racing	7	(Hong Kong) Geoffrey Kwong	1
(Sri Lanka) Dilango Racing	25	(Malaysia) Keifli Othman	2
(Sri Lanka) Dilango Racing	26	(Malaysia) Faizal Hakimi	2

== Race calendar ==
Round	Location	Circuit	Date	Pole position	Fastest lap	Winning driver	Winning team
1	Sepang, Malaysia	Sepang International Circuit	May 29–31	(Bahrain) Hamad Al Fardan	(Bahrain) Hamad Al Fardan	(Bahrain) Hamad Al Fardan	(Hong Kong) Dyna Ten Motorsport
2	Sepang, Malaysia	Sepang International Circuit	May 29–31		(Singapore) Ro Charlz	(Bahrain) Hamad Al Fardan	(Hong Kong) Dyna Ten Motorsport
3	Sepang, Malaysia	Sepang International Circuit	June 19–21	(Singapore) Ro Charlz	(Bahrain) Hamad Al Fardan	(Bahrain) Hamad Al Fardan	(Hong Kong) Dyna Ten Motorsport
4	Sepang, Malaysia	Sepang International Circuit	June 19–21		(Bahrain) Hamad Al Fardan	(Bahrain) Hamad Al Fardan	(Hong Kong) Dyna Ten Motorsport
5	Sentul, Indonesia	Sentul International Circuit	July 17–19	Cancelled, due to circuit resurfacing			
6	Sentul, Indonesia	Sentul International Circuit	July 17–19	Cancelled, due to circuit resurfacing			
7	Sentul, Indonesia	Sentul International Circuit	August 14–16	NO RECORD OF; EVENTS OCCURRING (presumed cancelled)			
8	Sentul, Indonesia	Sentul International Circuit	August 14–16	NO RECORD OF; EVENTS OCCURRING (presumed cancelled)			
9	Shanghai, China	Shanghai International Circuit	September 18–20	NO RECORD OF; EVENTS OCCURRING (presumed cancelled)			
10	Shanghai, China	Shanghai International Circuit	September 18–20	NO RECORD OF; EVENTS OCCURRING (presumed cancelled)			
11	Shanghai, China	Shanghai International Circuit	October 23–25	NO RECORD OF; EVENTS OCCURRING (presumed cancelled)			
12	Shanghai, China	Shanghai International Circuit	October 23–25	NO RECORD OF; EVENTS OCCURRING (presumed cancelled)			

== Full Series Results ==
Points are awarded in both races as following: 15, 12, 10, 8, 6, 5, 4, 3, 2 for 9th and 1 bonus points for pole position in the first of the two venue races but only awarded to drivers, not for teams. Only the drivers that achieve races are awarded by points. The team standing is obtained with the best two drivers of each team at each race

=== Drivers ===
Pos	Driver	MAL1 (Malaysia)		MAL2 (Malaysia)		Points
Pos	Driver	1	2	3	4	Points
1	(Bahrain) Hamad Al Fardan	1	1	1	1	61
2	(Singapore) Ro Charlz	3	2	2	2	47
3	(Hong Kong) Geoffrey Erik Kwong	4	4	3	3	36
4	(Taiwan) Kevin Chen	2	3			22
5	(Macau) Michael Ho	Ret	5	4	5	20
6	(Sri Lanka) Dilantha Malagamuwa	5	6			11
7	(Malaysia) Keifli Othman			5	6	11
8	(Australia) Mark Williamson			DNS	4	8
	(Singapore) Hafiz Koh	Ret	Ret			
	(Malaysia) Faizal Hakimi			DNS	DNS	
Pos	Driver	1	2	3	4	Points
Pos	Driver	MAL1 (Malaysia)		MAL2 (Malaysia)		Points

Colour	Result
Gold	Winner
Silver	Second place
Bronze	Third place
Green	Points classification
Blue	Non-points classification
Blue	Non-classified finish (NC)
Purple	Retired, not classified (Ret)
Red	Did not qualify (DNQ)
Red	Did not pre-qualify (DNPQ)
Black	Disqualified (DSQ)
White	Did not start (DNS)
White	Withdrew (WD)
White	Race cancelled (C)
Blank	Did not practice (DNP)
Blank	Did not arrive (DNA)
Blank	Excluded (EX)

=== Teams ===
Pos	Team	Drivers	MAL1 (Malaysia)		MAL2 (Malaysia)		Points
Pos	Team	Drivers	1	2	3	4	Points
1	(Hong Kong) Dyna Ten Motorsport	Hamad Al Fardan	1*	1	1*	1*	106
1	(Hong Kong) Dyna Ten Motorsport	Ro Charlz	3	2*	2	2	106
2	(Hong Kong) Champ Motorsport	Kevin Chen	2	3			62
2	(Hong Kong) Champ Motorsport	Michael Ho	Ret	5	4	5	62
2	(Hong Kong) Champ Motorsport	Geoffrey Kwong			3	3	62
3	(Sri Lanka) Dilango Racing	Geoffrey Kwong	4	4			38
3	(Sri Lanka) Dilango Racing	Dilantha Malagamuwa	5	6			38
3	(Sri Lanka) Dilango Racing	Keifli Othman			5	6	38
3	(Sri Lanka) Dilango Racing	Faizal Hakimi			DNS	DNS	38
Pos	Team	Drivers	1	2	3	4	Points
Pos	Team	Drivers	MAL1 (Malaysia)		MAL2 (Malaysia)		Points
