= 2008–09 GP2 Asia Series =

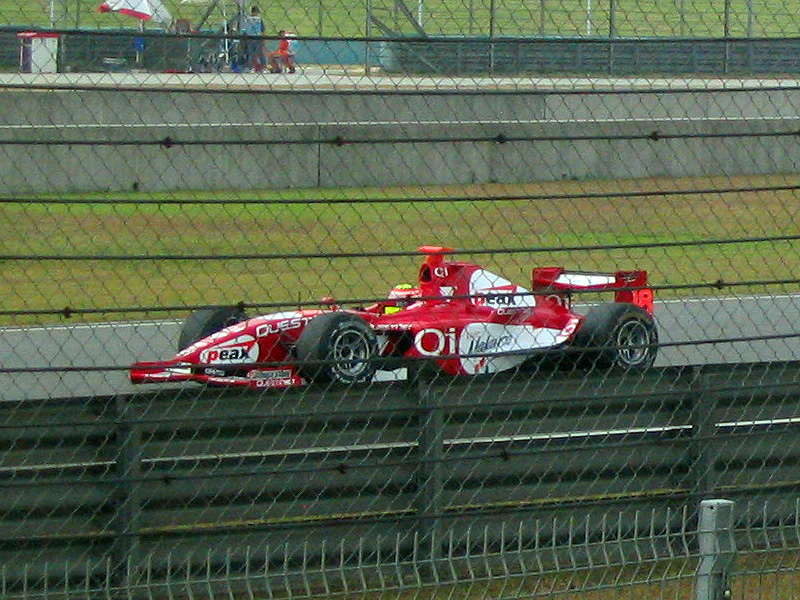
Alex Yoong driving for Qi-Meritus Mahara at the 2008 Chinese GP2 Asia Series round.

The 2008–09 GP2 Asia Series season was the second season of the GP2 Asia Series. It began on 18 October 2008 and ended on 26 April 2009 and consisted of eleven races at six events.

== Season summary ==
All teams from the 2008 GP2 Series season except for Racing Engineering took part in the competition, with the thirteenth slot being filled by Qi-Meritus Mahara. The reigning champion Romain Grosjean did not defend his title.

Kamui Kobayashi clinched the title with a fourth place at the penultimate race in Bahrain. 8 different winners were in 12 races: Kamui Kobayashi become champion, after Japanese won in two consecutive feature races at Dubai Autodrome, and at Bahrain International Circuit.

Diego Nunes won the last two feature races at Sepang International Circuit, and at Bahrain International Circuit. Roldán Rodríguez wins in first race of the season. Nico Hülkenberg, Luiz Razia, Vitaly Petrov, Davide Valsecchi, and Sergio Pérez each other won one race.

== Teams and drivers ==
All of the teams used the Dallara GP2/05 chassis with Renault-badged 4.0 litre (244 cu in) naturally-aspirated Mecachrome V8 engines order and with tyres supplied by Bridgestone.

| Team | No. | Driver | Rounds |
|---|---|---|---|
| (France) ART Grand Prix | 1 | (Japan) Sakon Yamamoto | All |
| (France) ART Grand Prix | 2 | (France) Nelson Philippe | 1 |
| (France) ART Grand Prix | 2 | (Venezuela) Pastor Maldonado | 2, 5–6 |
| (France) ART Grand Prix | 2 | (Germany) Nico Hülkenberg | 3–4 |
| (Netherlands) Trust Team Arden (Note: Arden International competed under a Dutch licence.) (1–2) (Netherlands) Arden International Motorsport (3–6) | 3 | (Brazil) Luiz Razia | All |
| (Netherlands) Trust Team Arden (1–2) (Netherlands) Arden International Motorsport (3–6) | 4 | (Finland) Mika Mäki | 1 |
| (Netherlands) Trust Team Arden (1–2) (Netherlands) Arden International Motorsport (3–6) | 4 | (Netherlands) Renger van der Zande | 2 |
| (Netherlands) Trust Team Arden (1–2) (Netherlands) Arden International Motorsport (3–6) | 4 | (Italy) Edoardo Mortara | 3–6 |
| (Spain) Barwa International Campos Team | 5 | (Russia) Vitaly Petrov | All |
| (Spain) Barwa International Campos Team | 6 | (Mexico) Sergio Pérez | All |
| (France) DAMS | 7 | (Belgium) Jérôme d'Ambrosio | All |
| (France) DAMS | 8 | (Japan) Kamui Kobayashi | All |
| (United Kingdom) GFH Team iSport | 9 | (Netherlands) Giedo van der Garde | All |
| (United Kingdom) GFH Team iSport | 10 | (Bahrain) Hamad Al Fardan | All |
| (United Kingdom) Super Nova Racing | 11 | (Spain) Javier Villa | All |
| (United Kingdom) Super Nova Racing | 12 | (United Kingdom) James Jakes | All |
| (Italy) Fisichella Motor Sport International | 14 | (United Arab Emirates) Andreas Zuber (Note: Zuber is an Austrian driver who competed under an Emirati racing licence.) | 1–2 |
| (Italy) Fisichella Motor Sport International | 14 | (Venezuela) Rodolfo González | 3–6 |
| (Italy) Fisichella Motor Sport International | 15 | (United States) Kevin Chen (Note: Chen is a Taiwan driver who competed under a United States racing licence.) | All |
| (Italy) Durango | 16 | (Italy) Davide Valsecchi | All |
| (Italy) Durango | 17 | (Brazil) Carlos Iaconelli | 1 |
| (Italy) Durango | 17 | (Italy) Michael Dalle Stelle | 2–6 |
| (Malaysia) My Team Qi-Meritus Mahara | 18 | (Malaysia) Alex Yoong | 1–2 |
| (Malaysia) My Team Qi-Meritus Mahara | 18 | (Italy) Marco Bonanomi | 3–6 |
| (Malaysia) My Team Qi-Meritus Mahara | 19 | (New Zealand) Earl Bamber | 1–3 |
| (Malaysia) My Team Qi-Meritus Mahara | 19 | (Portugal) Álvaro Parente | 4–6 |
| (Brazil) Piquet GP | 20 | (Spain) Roldán Rodríguez | All |
| (Brazil) Piquet GP | 21 | (Brazil) Diego Nunes | All |
| (United Kingdom) DPR | 22 | (Romania) Michael Herck | All |
| (United Kingdom) DPR | 23 | (Japan) Yuhi Sekiguchi | 1 |
| (United Kingdom) DPR | 23 | (Italy) Giacomo Ricci | 2–6 |
| (Spain) BCN Competición* | 24 | (Japan) Hiroki Yoshimoto | 1 |
| (Spain) BCN Competición* | 25 | (Italy) Luca Filippi | 1 |
| (Portugal) Ocean Racing Technology* | 24 | (Netherlands) Yelmer Buurman | 2–5 |
| (Portugal) Ocean Racing Technology* | 24 | (India) Karun Chandhok | 6 |
| (Portugal) Ocean Racing Technology* | 25 | | |
| (Portugal) Ocean Racing Technology* | 25 | (Italy) Fabrizio Crestani | 2–6 |
| (Italy) Trident Racing | 26 | (Italy) Giacomo Ricci | 1 |
| (Italy) Trident Racing | 26 | (Brazil) Alberto Valerio | 2 |
| (Italy) Trident Racing | 26 | (Italy) Frankie Provenzano | 3–4 |
| (Italy) Trident Racing | 26 | (Portugal) Ricardo Teixeira | 5–6 |
| (Italy) Trident Racing | 27 | (New Zealand) Chris van der Drift | 1–2 |
| (Italy) Trident Racing | 27 | (Spain) Adrián Vallés | 3 |
| (Italy) Trident Racing | 27 | (Italy) Davide Rigon | 4–6 |

* – Team was known as BCN Competición at round one in Shanghai, before Tiago Monteiro bought over the team's assets and renamed it as Ocean Racing Technology.

== Calendar ==
On 12 July, GP2 Series organisers announced a provisional calendar for their second season. Unlike the first season of the GP2 Asia Series, this season will start prior to the new year, and be expanded to six events from the previous five. The Indonesian round has been dropped, while Bahrain earns a second event and Shanghai earns its first GP2 races. Shanghai will also host the official GP2 Asia Series test session prior to the start of the season.

The sprint race of the second round of the championship – at the Dubai Autodrome – was cancelled due to flooding.

On 17 December, an alteration was made to the calendar, with the Losail International Circuit in Qatar replacing the February meeting in Dubai. The meeting was also moved to February 12–14 because the original date on the calendar was unsuitable, due to MotoGP testing. This event introduced night racing to GP2, following the circuit's lead with MotoGP and its support classes and also Formula One's night race in Singapore.

=== Race Calendar ===
| Round | | Circuit | Date | Pole position | Fastest Lap | Winning driver | Winning team | Report |
|---|---|---|---|---|---|---|---|---|
| 1 | F | (China) Shanghai International Circuit | 18 October | (Spain) Roldán Rodríguez | (Japan) Kamui Kobayashi | (Spain) Roldán Rodríguez | (Brazil) Piquet GP | Report |
| 1 | S | (China) Shanghai International Circuit | 19 October | | (Japan) Sakon Yamamoto (Note: Sakon Yamamoto set the fastest lap, but did not finish in the top 10, so was ineligible to be the point-scorer for the fastest lap. Javier Villa was the point-scorer instead for setting the fastest lap of those finishing in the top 10.) | (Italy) Davide Valsecchi | (Italy) Durango | Report |
| 2 | F | (United Arab Emirates) Dubai Autodrome | 5 December | (Japan) Kamui Kobayashi | (Japan) Kamui Kobayashi | (Japan) Kamui Kobayashi | (France) DAMS | Report |
| 2 | S | (United Arab Emirates) Dubai Autodrome | 6 December | Race cancelled | | | | Report |
| 3 | F | Bahrain International Circuit | 23 January | (Germany) Nico Hülkenberg | (Japan) Kamui Kobayashi | (Japan) Kamui Kobayashi | (France) DAMS | Report |
| 3 | S | Bahrain International Circuit | 24 January | | (Brazil) Diego Nunes (Note: Diego Nunes set the fastest lap, but did not finish in the top 10, so was ineligible to be the point-scorer for the fastest lap. Jérôme d'Ambrosio was the point-scorer instead for setting the fastest lap of those finishing in the top 10.) | (Mexico) Sergio Pérez | (Spain) Barwa International Campos Team | Report |
| 4 | F | (Qatar) Losail International Circuit | 13 February | (Germany) Nico Hülkenberg | (Portugal) Álvaro Parente (Note: Álvaro Parente set the fastest lap, but did not finish in the top 10, so was ineligible to be the point-scorer for the fastest lap. Nico Hülkenberg was the point-scorer instead for setting the fastest lap of those finishing in the top 10.) | (Germany) Nico Hülkenberg | (France) ART Grand Prix | Report |
| 4 | S | (Qatar) Losail International Circuit | 14 February | | (Mexico) Sergio Pérez | (Mexico) Sergio Pérez | (Spain) Barwa International Campos Team | Report |
| 5 | F | (Malaysia) Sepang International Circuit | 4 April | (Belgium) Jérôme d'Ambrosio (Note: Jérôme d'Ambrosio set the fastest time in qualifying, but did not start due to gearbox problems. The pole position remained empty on the grid. Diego Nunes was the first driver on the grid in second place. d'Ambrosio is still considered to hold the pole position.) | (Spain) Javier Villa (Note: Javier Villa set the fastest lap, but did not finish in the top 10, so was ineligible to be the point-scorer for the fastest lap. James Jakes was the point-scorer instead for setting the fastest lap of those finishing in the top 10.) | (Brazil) Diego Nunes | (Brazil) Piquet GP | Report |
| 5 | S | (Malaysia) Sepang International Circuit | 5 April | | (Portugal) Álvaro Parente | (Russia) Vitaly Petrov | (Spain) Barwa International Campos Team | Report |
| 6 | F | Bahrain International Circuit | 25 April | (Japan) Kamui Kobayashi (Note: Jérôme d'Ambrosio recorded the fastest time in the time trial, but got a ten-place penalty after receiving a black flag in the previous Malaysian sprint race. Kamui Kobayashi was identified for the race pole position.) | (Belgium) Jérôme d'Ambrosio | (Brazil) Diego Nunes | (Brazil) Piquet GP | Report |
| 6 | S | Bahrain International Circuit | 26 April | | (Belgium) Jérôme d'Ambrosio | (Brazil) Luiz Razia | (Netherlands) Arden International Motorsport | Report |

== Championship standings ==
Scoring system

Points are awarded to the top 8 classified finishers in the Feature race, and to the top 6 classified finishers in the Sprint race. The pole-sitter in the feature race will also receive two points, and one point is given to the driver who set the fastest lap inside the top ten in both the feature and sprint races. No extra points are awarded to the pole-sitter in the sprint race.

Point system for Feature Race
| Position | **1st** | **2nd** | **3rd** | **4th** | **5th** | **6th** | **7th** | **8th** | **Pole** | **FL** |
| Points | 10 | 8 | 6 | 5 | 4 | 3 | 2 | 1 | 2 | 1 |

Point system for Sprint Race
| Position | **1st** | **2nd** | **3rd** | **4th** | **5th** | **6th** | **FL** |
| Points | 6 | 5 | 4 | 3 | 2 | 1 | 1 |

=== Drivers' Championship ===
| Pos | Driver | SHI (China) | | DUB (United Arab Emirates) | | BHR (Bahrain) | | LSL (Qatar) | | SEP (Malaysia) | | BHR (Bahrain) | | Points |
|---|---|---|---|---|---|---|---|---|---|---|---|---|---|---|
| 1 | (Japan) Kamui Kobayashi | 2 | Ret | **1** | C | 1 | 6 | 4 | 18 | 2 | 7 | **4** | 5 | 56 |
| 2 | (Belgium) Jérôme d'Ambrosio | 9 | 5 | 7 | C | 2 | 3 | 5 | 7 | **DNS** | DSQ | 3 | 2 | 36 |
| 3 | (Spain) Roldán Rodríguez | **1** | 6 | 3 | C | 6 | 23 | Ret | 17 | 4 | 12 | 2 | Ret | 35 |
| 4 | (Italy) Davide Valsecchi | 8 | 1 | 2 | C | 5 | 2 | 6 | 5 | 8 | 3 | 16 | Ret | 34 |
| 5 | (Russia) Vitaly Petrov | 5 | Ret | 5 | C | 10 | 12 | 3 | 2 | 6 | 1 | 19 | 11 | 28 |
| 6 | (Germany) Nico Hülkenberg | | | | | **4** | 4 | **1** | 3 | | | | | 27 |
| 7 | (Mexico) Sergio Pérez | Ret | 7 | 6 | C | 8 | 1 | 2 | 1 | Ret | 6 | 12 | 9 | 26 |
| 8 | (Brazil) Diego Nunes | 12 | Ret | Ret | C | 13 | 22 | 11 | 12 | 1 | 4 | 1 | 6 | 24 |
| 9 | (Japan) Sakon Yamamoto | 3 | 14 | 8 | C | 17 | 11 | Ret | 14 | 12 | Ret | 6 | 4 | 13 |
| 10 | (Spain) Javier Villa | 4 | 3 | 9 | C | 9 | 5 | 13 | 10 | 19 | 18 | 15 | 12 | 12 |
| 11 | (Italy) Edoardo Mortara | | | | | 3 | 8 | 7 | 4 | Ret | 17 | Ret | 16 | 11 |
| 12 | (Netherlands) Giedo van der Garde | 10 | DNS | 4 | C | 7 | 14 | 12 | 8 | 14 | 10 | 5 | 7 | 11 |
| 13 | (Brazil) Luiz Razia | Ret | 17 | 10 | C | 14 | 9 | 8 | 6 | Ret | Ret | 8 | 1 | 9 |
| 14 | (New Zealand) Earl Bamber | 6 | 2 | Ret | C | 11 | 7 | | | | | | | 8 |
| 15 | (Venezuela) Pastor Maldonado | | | Ret | C | | | | | 7 | 2 | Ret | Ret | 7 |
| 16 | (United Kingdom) James Jakes | Ret | 11 | 12 | C | 22 | Ret | 9 | 9 | 3 | Ret | 10 | 14 | 7 |
| 17 | (Italy) Davide Rigon | | | | | | | 14 | 15 | Ret | 13 | 7 | 3 | 6 |
| 18 | (New Zealand) Chris van der Drift | 7 | 4 | Ret | C | | | | | | | | | 5 |
| 19 | (Netherlands) Yelmer Buurman | | | Ret | C | Ret | 13 | Ret | DNS | 5 | 11 | | | 4 |
| 20 | (Bahrain) Hamad Al Fardan | 15 | Ret | Ret | C | 12 | Ret | Ret | Ret | 9 | 5 | Ret | 17 | 2 |
| 21 | (Portugal) Álvaro Parente | | | | | | | 17 | 16 | 11 | 9 | Ret | 13 | 1 |
| 22 | (Italy) Marco Bonanomi | | | | | 20 | 10 | 16 | 11 | Ret | 14 | 14 | 8 | 0 |
| 23 | (Venezuela) Rodolfo González | | | | | 16 | Ret | Ret | 19 | 10 | 8 | Ret | Ret | 0 |
| 24 | (Japan) Hiroki Yoshimoto | Ret | 8 | | | | | | | | | | | 0 |
| 25 | (Malaysia) Alex Yoong | 14 | 9 | Ret | C | | | | | | | | | 0 |
| 26 | (India) Karun Chandhok | | | | | | | | | | | 9 | Ret | 0 |
| 27 | (Italy) Giacomo Ricci | 13 | Ret | 13 | C | Ret | 16 | Ret | 13 | 16 | 15 | 11 | 10 | 0 |
| 28 | (Italy) Fabrizio Crestani | | | 14 | C | Ret | 17 | 10 | 21 | 15 | 16 | 18 | 15 | 0 |
| 29 | (Finland) Mika Mäki | Ret | 10 | | | | | | | | | | | 0 |
| 30 | (Brazil) Carlos Iaconelli | 11 | Ret | | | | | | | | | | | 0 |
| 31 | (Netherlands) Renger van der Zande | | | 11 | C | | | | | | | | | 0 |
| 32 | (Japan) Yuhi Sekiguchi | Ret | 12 | | | | | | | | | | | 0 |
| 33 | (Romania) Michael Herck | 16 | 16 | 15 | C | 18 | 18 | 15 | Ret | 13 | Ret | 13 | Ret | 0 |
| 34 | (France) Nelson Philippe | 17 | 13 | | | | | | | | | | | 0 |
| 35 | (Italy) Frankie Provenzano | | | | | 15 | 15 | 19 | 20 | | | | | 0 |
| 36 | (United States) Kevin Chen | Ret | 15 | 18 | C | 21 | 21 | 18 | 23 | 20 | Ret | Ret | 18 | 0 |
| 37 | (Brazil) Alberto Valerio | | | 16 | C | | | | | | | | | 0 |
| 38 | (Portugal) Ricardo Teixeira | | | | | | | | | 17 | 19 | 17 | Ret | 0 |
| 39 | (Italy) Michael Dalle Stelle | | | 17 | C | 19 | 20 | 20 | 22 | 18 | 20 | Ret | 19 | 0 |
| 40 | (Spain) Adrián Vallés | | | | | Ret | 19 | | | | | | | 0 |
| – | (United Arab Emirates) Andreas Zuber | Ret | Ret | Ret | C | | | | | | | | | 0 |
| – | (Italy) Luca Filippi | Ret | Ret | | | | | | | | | | | 0 |
| Pos | Driver | SHI (China) | | DUB (United Arab Emirates) | | BHR (Bahrain) | | LSL (Qatar) | | SEP (Malaysia) | | BHR (Bahrain) | | Points |

Key
| Colour | Result |
|---|---|
| Gold | Winner |
| Silver | 2nd place |
| Bronze | 3rd place |
| Green | Other points position |
| Blue | Other classified position |
| Blue | Not classified, finished (NC) |
| Purple | Not classified, retired (Ret) |
| Red | Did not qualify (DNQ) |
| Red | Did not pre-qualify (DNPQ) |
| Black | Disqualified (DSQ) |
| White | Did not start (DNS) |
| White | Race cancelled (C) |
| Blank | Did not practice (DNP) |
| Blank | Excluded (EX) |
| Blank | Did not arrive (DNA) |
| Blank | Withdrawn (WD) |
| Text formatting | Meaning |
| **Bold** | Pole position point(s) |
| Italics | Fastest lap point(s) |

Notes:

- † — Drivers did not finish the race, but were classified as they completed over 90% of the race distance.

=== Teams' Championship ===
| Pos | Team | Car No. | SHI (China) | | DUB (United Arab Emirates) | | BHR (Bahrain) | | LSL (Qatar) | | SEP (Malaysia) | | BHR (Bahrain) | | Points |
|---|---|---|---|---|---|---|---|---|---|---|---|---|---|---|---|
| 1 | (France) DAMS | 7 | 9 | 5 | 7 | C | 2 | 3 | 5 | 7 | **DNS** | DSQ | 3 | 2 | 92 |
| 1 | (France) DAMS | 8 | 2 | Ret | **1** | C | 1 | 6 | 4 | 18 | 2 | 7 | **4** | 5 | 92 |
| 2 | (Brazil) Piquet GP | 20 | **1** | 6 | 3 | C | 6 | 23 | Ret | 17 | 4 | 12 | 2 | Ret | 59 |
| 2 | (Brazil) Piquet GP | 21 | 12 | Ret | Ret | C | 13 | 22 | 11 | 12 | 1 | 4 | 1 | 6 | 59 |
| 3 | (Spain) Barwa International Campos Team | 5 | 5 | Ret | 5 | C | 10 | 12 | 3 | 2 | 6 | 1 | 19 | 11 | 54 |
| 3 | (Spain) Barwa International Campos Team | 6 | Ret | 7 | 6 | C | 8 | 1 | 2 | 1 | Ret | 6 | 12 | 9 | 54 |
| 4 | (France) ART Grand Prix | 1 | 3 | 14 | 8 | C | 17 | 11 | Ret | 14 | 12 | Ret | 6 | 4 | 47 |
| 4 | (France) ART Grand Prix | 2 | 17 | 13 | Ret | C | **4** | 4 | **1** | 3 | 7 | 2 | Ret | Ret | 47 |
| 5 | (Italy) Durango | 16 | 8 | 1 | 2 | C | 5 | 2 | 6 | 5 | 8 | 3 | 16 | Ret | 34 |
| 5 | (Italy) Durango | 17 | 11 | Ret | 17 | C | 19 | 20 | 20 | 22 | 18 | 20 | Ret | 19 | 34 |
| 6 | (Netherlands) Trust Team Arden (1–2) (Netherlands) Arden International Motorsport (3–6) | 3 | Ret | 17 | 10 | C | 14 | 9 | 8 | 6 | Ret | Ret | 8 | 1 | 20 |
| 6 | (Netherlands) Trust Team Arden (1–2) (Netherlands) Arden International Motorsport (3–6) | 4 | Ret | 10 | 11 | C | 3 | 8 | 7 | 4 | Ret | 17 | Ret | 16 | 20 |
| 7 | (United Kingdom) Super Nova Racing | 11 | 4 | 3 | 9 | C | 9 | 5 | 13 | 10 | 19 | 18 | 15 | 12 | 19 |
| 7 | (United Kingdom) Super Nova Racing | 12 | Ret | 11 | 12 | C | 22 | Ret | 9 | 9 | 3 | Ret | 10 | 14 | 19 |
| 8 | (United Kingdom) GFH Team iSport | 9 | 10 | DNS | 4 | C | 7 | 14 | 12 | 8 | 14 | 10 | 5 | 7 | 13 |
| 8 | (United Kingdom) GFH Team iSport | 10 | 15 | Ret | Ret | C | 12 | Ret | Ret | Ret | 9 | 5 | Ret | 17 | 13 |
| 9 | (Italy) Trident Racing | 26 | 13 | Ret | 16 | C | 15 | 15 | 19 | 20 | 17 | 13 | 17 | 3 | 11 |
| 9 | (Italy) Trident Racing | 27 | 7 | 4 | Ret | C | Ret | 19 | 14 | 15 | Ret | 19 | 7 | Ret | 11 |
| 10 | (Malaysia) My Team Qi-Meritus Mahara | 18 | 14 | 9 | Ret | C | 20 | 10 | 16 | 11 | Ret | 14 | 14 | 8 | 9 |
| 10 | (Malaysia) My Team Qi-Meritus Mahara | 19 | 6 | 2 | Ret | C | 11 | 7 | 17 | 16 | 11 | 9 | Ret | 13 | 9 |
| 11 | (Portugal) Ocean Racing Technology | 24 | | | Ret | C | Ret | 13 | Ret | DNS | 5 | 11 | 9 | Ret | 4 |
| 11 | (Portugal) Ocean Racing Technology | 25 | | | 14 | C | Ret | 17 | 10 | 21 | 15 | 16 | 18 | 15 | 4 |
| 12 | (Italy) Fisichella Motor Sport International | 14 | Ret | Ret | Ret | C | 16 | Ret | Ret | 19 | 10 | 8 | Ret | Ret | 0 |
| 12 | (Italy) Fisichella Motor Sport International | 15 | Ret | 15 | 18 | C | 21 | 21 | 18 | 23 | 20 | Ret | Ret | 18 | 0 |
| 13 | (United Kingdom) DPR | 22 | 16 | 16 | 15 | C | 18 | 18 | 15 | Ret | 13 | Ret | 13 | Ret | 0 |
| 13 | (United Kingdom) DPR | 23 | Ret | 12 | 13 | C | Ret | 16 | Ret | 13 | 16 | 15 | 11 | 10 | 0 |
| 14 | (Spain) BCN Competición | 24 | Ret | 8 | | | | | | | | | | | 0 |
| 14 | (Spain) BCN Competición | 25 | Ret | Ret | | | | | | | | | | | 0 |
| Pos | Team | Car No. | SHI (China) | | DUB (United Arab Emirates) | | BHR (Bahrain) | | LSL (Qatar) | | SEP (Malaysia) | | BHR (Bahrain) | | Points |

Key
| Colour | Result |
|---|---|
| Gold | Winner |
| Silver | 2nd place |
| Bronze | 3rd place |
| Green | Other points position |
| Blue | Other classified position |
| Blue | Not classified, finished (NC) |
| Purple | Not classified, retired (Ret) |
| Red | Did not qualify (DNQ) |
| Red | Did not pre-qualify (DNPQ) |
| Black | Disqualified (DSQ) |
| White | Did not start (DNS) |
| White | Race cancelled (C) |
| Blank | Did not practice (DNP) |
| Blank | Excluded (EX) |
| Blank | Did not arrive (DNA) |
| Blank | Withdrawn (WD) |
| Text formatting | Meaning |
| **Bold** | Pole position point(s) |
| Italics | Fastest lap point(s) |

Notes:

- † — Drivers did not finish the race, but were classified as they completed over 90% of the race distance.
