= Formula V6 Asia =

Former Single-Seater Racing Championship

- Formula V6 Asia
- Category: Formula Renault 3.5
- Country: Asia
- Inaugural season: 2006
- Folded: 2009
- Constructors: Tatuus
- Engine suppliers: Renault
- Last Drivers' champion: (Bahrain) Hamad Al Fardan
- Last Teams' champion: (Hong Kong) Dyna Ten Motorsport
- Official website: afos.com/fv6

Formula Asia V6 Renault, renamed Formula V6 Asia in 2007 by Motorsport Asia, was launched in 2006 and regulated by Motorsport Asia. It was a Formula Renault 3.5 that include also World Series by Renault and the former Formula Renault V6 Eurocup.

For the first time, Southeast Asian-based drivers were able to progress from karting, through the ranks of junior single seaters, and step up to a programme specifically designed to groom them for the pinnacle of international motorsport.

This Series was the latest addition to the Championships already organised by Motorsport Asia, namely the Asian Touring Car Championship, Formula BMW Asia and the Porsche Carrera Cup Asia in the region's leading motorsport event, the Asian Festival of Speed.

The first championship, in 2006, was won by Indian driver Karun Chandhok, who beat fellow Asians Ananda Mikola and Hanss Lin to win the title. The crowned driver was rewarded with a test in a World Series by Renault car at Paul Ricard.

The series was presumed to be defunct after the 2009 season, which was cut short after just two race meetings, and subsequently no information has been given by the organisers of the series.

== Races program ==
Each venue include two races:

- The Super Sprint with rolling start between 60 and 90 km, and over a maximum racing duration of 30 min.
- The Grand Race with standing start between 100 and 130 km, and over a maximum racing duration of 45 min.

Point system:

Position	1st	2nd	3rd	4th	5th	6th	7th	8th	9th	10th
Points	15	12	10	8	6	5	4	3	2	1

In each race, 1 point is allowed for pole position.
Drivers completed fewer than 90% of the race distance will not score points.

== Cars ==
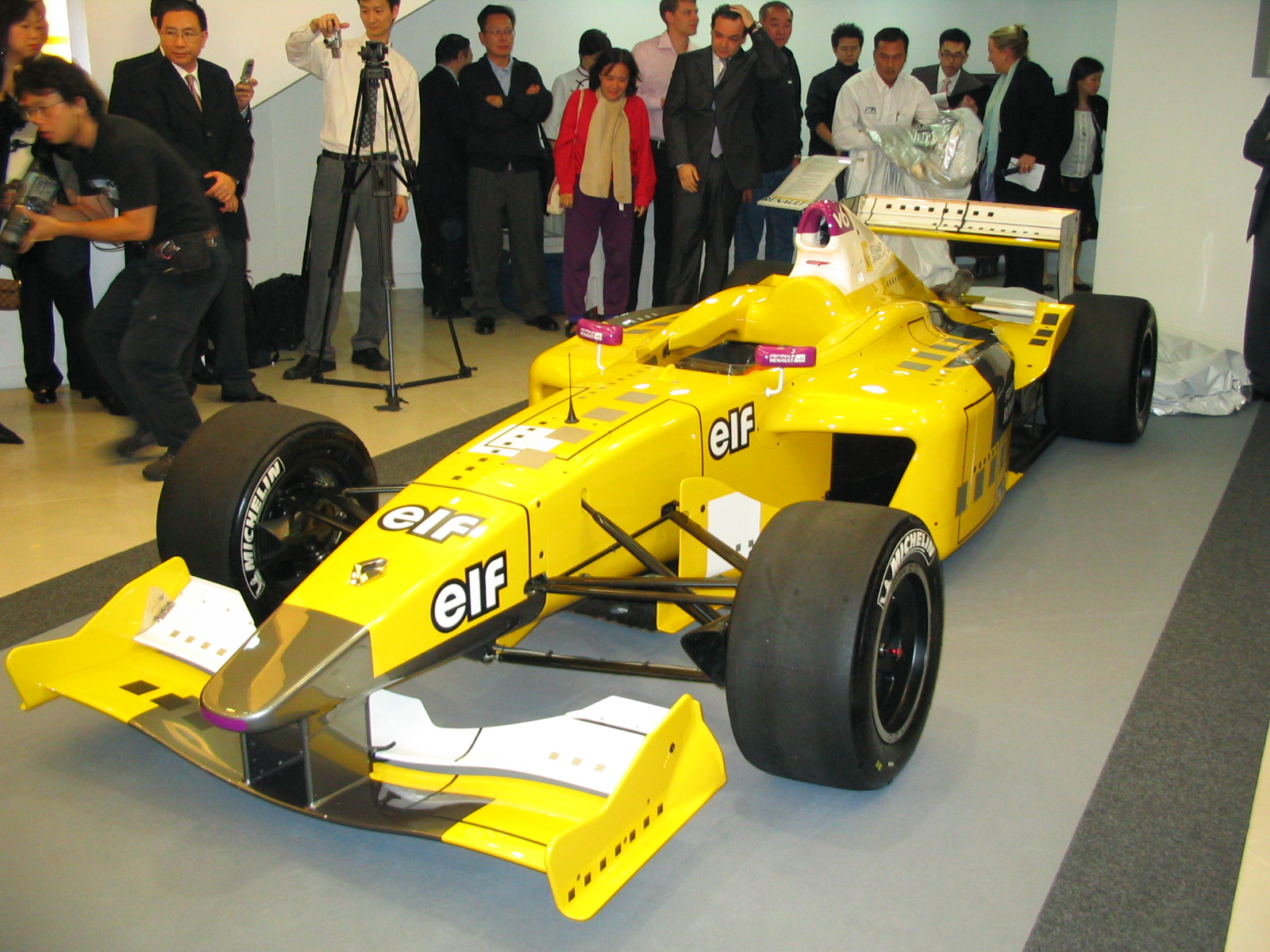
Formula Asia V6 car

The series ran with Tatuus chassis carbon monocoque and a Nissan-sourced 3.5 L V6 engine. Michelin is the tyres supplier.

- Engine : Renault Type V4Y RS, 60° V6, 3498 cc, 370 hp
- Chassis : Tatuus Carbon-fibre Monocoque, carbon and fibreglass bodywork
- Width : 1850 mm (72.8") maximum
- Wheelbase : 3000 mm
- Track : 1579 mm (front) and 1536 mm (rear)
- Weight: 590 kg
- Fuel : 90 litres
- Suspension front and rear with torsion bar, push-rod, twin struts
- Telemetry, and steering wheel
- Sequential manual transmission, six gears
- Wheels : Single piece magnesium with central nut, 10 x 13 (front) and 13 x 13 (rear)
- Tyres : Michelin dry and rain, 24 x 57 x 13 (front) and 31 x 60 x 13 (rear)

== Champions ==
Season	Series Name	Champion	Team Champion
2006	Formula V6 Asia by Renault	(India) Karun Chandhok	(South Korea) Team E-Rain
2007	Formula Renault V6 Asia Championship	(United Kingdom) James Winslow	(Malaysia) Team Meritus
2008	Formula V6 Asia	(Thailand) James Grunwell	(Malaysia) TPC Team QI-Meritus
2009	Formula V6 Asia	(Bahrain) Hamad Al Fardan	(Hong Kong) Dyna Ten Motorsport
