= Meritus.GP =

Malaysian motor racing team

(Malaysia) Team Meritus
- Founded: 1983
- Team principal(s): Sean Thompson
- Current series: F4 Saudi Arabia Championship
- Former series: British F3; GP2 Asia Series; JK Racing Asia Series; Formula V6 Asia; Formula Masters China; Asia Cup; Formula 4 South East Asia Championship
- Noted drivers: (Australia) Jake Parsons (Malaysia) Daniel Woodroof
- Teams' Championships: Formula BMW Asia: 2003- 2004 2006-2009; Formula V6 Asia: 2007 - 2008; Formula Masters China: 2013
- Drivers' Championships: Formula BMW Asia: 2003 : Ho-Pin Tung; 2004 : Marchy Lee; 2006 : Earl Bamber; 2007 : Jazeman Jaafar; 2008 : Ross Jamison; 2009 :Rio Haryanto; Formula V6 Asia: 2007 : James Winslow; 2008 : James Grunwell; Formula Masters China: 2013: Aidan Wright

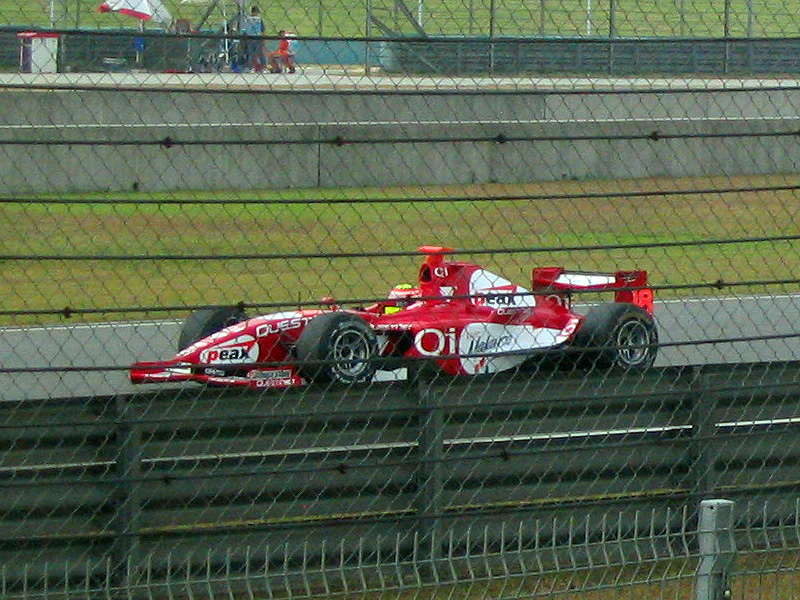
Alex Yoong drive Meritus's car at the 2008 Chinese GP2 Asia Series round.

Meritus.GP is a Malaysian motor racing team. The team is owned by Peter Thompson and Firhat Mokhzani, and managed by engineer Sean Thompson. The team was founded as Marlboro Castrol Meritus in 1996.

F4 SEA was a one-team arrive and drive championship, ran by MERITUS.GP in its first 4 seasons. A premium race engineering services provider, MERITUS.GP have 36 Championship titles competing in GP2, Lamborghini Super Trofeo, Formula Renault V6, Formula Masters and Formula BMW.

MERITUS.GP drivers like Earl Bamber, Luca Filippi, Alex Yoong, Afiq Ikhwan, Narain Karthikeyan, Alexander Rossi, Takuma Sato, Jazeman Jaafar & Rio Haryanto have gone on to Formula 1, Le Mans and Indy Car.

== Results ==
=== GP2 Asia Series ===
(key) (Races in bold indicate pole position) (Races in italics indicate fastest lap)

Year	Chassis Engine Tyres	Drivers	1	2	3	4	5	6	7	8	9	10	11	12	T.C.	Points
2008	GP2/05; Renault; **B**		DUB1; FEA	DUB1; SPR	SEN; FEA	SEN; SPR	SEP; FEA	SEP; SPR	BHR; FEA	BHR; SPR	DUB2; FEA	DUB2; SPR			9th	17
2008	GP2/05; Renault; **B**	(Japan) Hiroki Yoshimoto	6	4	Ret	20	Ret	10	12	4	5	13			9th	17
2008	GP2/05; Renault; **B**	(Italy) Luca Filippi	5	Ret	DSQ	21	Ret	Ret	Ret	11	12	Ret			9th	17
2008–09	GP2/05; Renault; **B**		SHI; FEA	SHI; SPR	DUB3; FEA	DUB3; SPR	BHR1; FEA	BHR1; SPR	LSL; FEA	LSL; SPR	SEP; FEA	SEP; SPR	BHR2; FEA	BHR2; SPR	10th	9
2008–09	GP2/05; Renault; **B**	(Malaysia) Alex Yoong	14	9	Ret	C									10th	9
2008–09	GP2/05; Renault; **B**	(Italy) Marco Bonanomi					20	10	16	11	Ret	14	14	8	10th	9
2008–09	GP2/05; Renault; **B**	(New Zealand) Earl Bamber	6	2	Ret	C	11	7							10th	9
2008–09	GP2/05; Renault; **B**	(Portugal) Alvaro Parente							17	16	11	9	Ret	13	10th	9
2009–10	GP2/05; Renault; **B**		YMC1; FEA	YMC1; SPR	YMC2; FEA	YMC2; SPR	BHR1; FEA	BHR1; SPR	BHR2; FEA	BHR2; SPR					4th	34
2009–10	GP2/05; Renault; **B**	(Italy) Luca Filippi	2	8	14^{†}	17	2	18	**1**	8					4th	34
2009–10	GP2/05; Renault; **B**	(Brazil) Diego Nunes	Ret	13											4th	34
2009–10	GP2/05; Renault; **B**	(United States) Alexander Rossi			6	9	Ret	Ret	11	5					4th	34

== Timeline ==
Former series
Formula BMW Asia	2003–2012
Formula V6 Asia	2006–2008
GP2 Asia Series	2008–2010
Formula Masters China	2012–2015
Formula 4 South East Asia Championship	2016–2019
F4 Saudi Arabian Championship	2023–2024
