= Kevin Chen (racing driver) =

Taiwanese racing driver (born 1979)

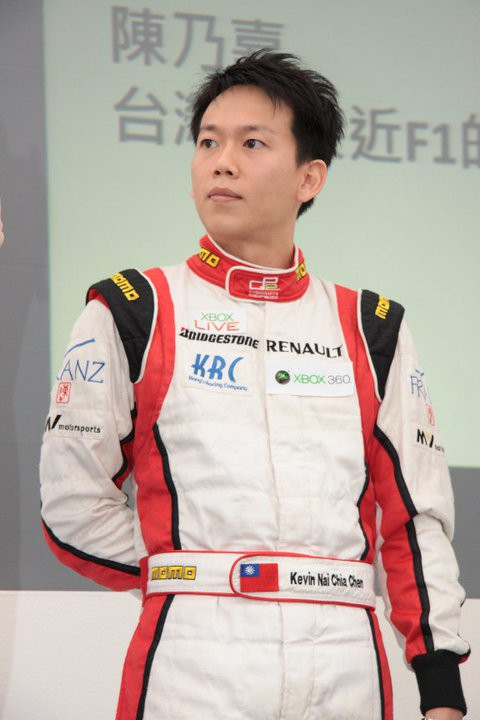
- Nationality: (Taiwan) Taiwanese
- Born: April 2, 1979 (age 47) Taipei (Taiwan)

British F3 career
- Debut season: 2009
- Current team: Räikkönen Robertson Racing
- Car number: 16
- Starts: 6
- Wins: 0
- Poles: 0
- Fastest laps: 0
- Best finish: 20th in 2009

Previous series
- 2008–09 2007–09: GP2 Asia Series; Formula V6 Asia

Kevin Nai Chia Chen (Traditional Chinese: 陳乃嘉; born April 2, 1979, in Taipei) is a Taiwanese racing driver, who obtained the first FIA A license by a Taiwanese driver.

== Career ==
Chen's career started in the United States as a club racer in the Sports Car Club of America, where he won the Touring 2 Championship in 2003. In 2004, he continued in Touring 2, and again won the championship title. In 2005, he was runner-up in the Show Room Stock B class, and also competed in the Pro Spec Miata series, earning several podium finishes. Chen also set a new track record at Willow Springs Raceway, California with his Show Room Stock B BMW Z4 car.

In 2005, Chen was recruited by Mopar Racing (Chrysler) after his brilliant performance in the SCCA Year-End Runoffs. Chen qualified in fourth, but crashed into the tyre wall during the first lap due to the wet track. He fell to last position with the car in bad shape, but he still managed to fight back, and finished the race in seventh, passing 30 cars in the process.

In 2007, Chen changed from touring cars to Formula Asia V6 Renault, which was his first formula racing experience, and he gained a podium finish in just 4 meetings.

In 2008, Chen drove for Champ Motorsport in the Formula V6 Asia championship. He was on the podiums in the Sepang, Malaysia round, Sentul, Indonesia round and Shanghai International Circuit, China round.

Chen competed in the 2008–09 GP2 Asia Series season with FMS International

Chen competed in the first round of the 2009 Formula V6 Asia season, claiming two podiums at Sepang. He also competed for Räikkönen Robertson Racing at the British Formula Three Championship rounds in support of the 2009 Spa 24 Hours. These were Chen's first European races, becoming the first Taiwanese driver competing in the British F3 International Class. He continued with the team for the following two rounds, and scored points in two of the three rounds.

In 2009, Chen became the spokesperson for Microsoft Xbox 360 Forza in Taiwan.

Chen joined the World Touring Car Championship in 2010 with Scuderia Proteam driving a BMW 320si. He competed in the Japan Okayama round and Macau Grand Prix, and finished last race of the season with a 14th position, and 4th position in Macau Grand Prix.

In 2012, Chen competed in Audi LMS R8 and qualified fourth, finished in ninth position. In the same year, Chen hosted for ESPN StarSports Asia F1 Live Singapore and Korean Rounds.

In 2013, Chen competed in Lotus Greater China Race at Guangdong International Circuit, where he won pole position and both races with a Champion title.

In 2014, Chen became the spokesperson of BMW China Mission 3 Event.

Chen, the first professional driver in Taiwan with an FIA A license also holds an FIA A instructor license. He has coaches throughout Asia in Taiwan, China, Japan and Malaysia, also in the United States. He teaches in private one on one, China Super Car Series, Option Magazine Racing Academy, he also coordinates events for the factory driving experiences.

== Racing record ==
=== Complete GP2 Series results ===
==== Complete GP2 Asia Series results ====
Year	Entrant	1	2	3	4	5	6	7	8	9	10	11	12	DC	Points
2008–09	FMS International	CHN; FEA; Ret	CHN; SPR; 15	UAE; FEA; 18	UAE; SPR; C	BHR; FEA; 21	BHR; SPR; 21	QAT; FEA; 18	QAT; SPR; 23	MAL; FEA; 20	MAL; SPR; Ret	BHR; FEA; Ret	BHR; SPR; 18	36th	0

=== Complete WTCC results ===
(key) (Races in bold indicate pole position) (Races in italics indicate fastest lap)

Year	Team	Car	1	2	3	4	5	6	7	8	9	10	11	12	13	14	15	16	17	18	19	20	21	22	DC	Points
2010	Scuderia Proteam Motorsport	BMW 320si	BRA; 1	BRA; 2	MAR; 1	MAR; 2	ITA; 1	ITA; 2	BEL; 1	BEL; 2	POR; 1	POR; 2	GBR; 1	GBR; 2	CZE; 1	CZE; 2	GER; 1	GER; 2	ESP; 1	ESP; 2	JPN; 1 Ret	JPN; 2; 20	MAC; 1; 17	MAC; 2; 14	**NC**	**0**
