= Hamad Al Fardan =

Bahraini racing driver and musician

Hamad Al Fardan (حمد الفردان)
- Nationality: (Bahrain) Bahraini
- Born: June 29, 1987 (age 39) Manama, Bahrain

Previous series
- 2008–09 2008 2007–08 2007 2006–07 2006, 2009 2004–06: GP2 Asia Series; ATS Formel 3 Cup; Asian Formula Three; British Formula 3 Toyota Racing Series; Formula V6 Asia; Formula BMW Asia

Championship titles
- 2009: Formula V6 Asia

Hamad Al Fardan (Arabic: حامد الفردن; born June 29, 1987, in Manama), is a Bahraini racing driver. He is the first Bahraini to drive at GP2 Series level.

== Racing career ==
=== Formula BMW ===
Al Fardan is the son of rally driver Ahmed Al Fardan. His first experience of formula racing came in 2004, when he drove in the Formula BMW Asia series. In 2005, he undertook a full season in the championship with the Malaysian team Meritus and finished third overall. He also raced in the Formula BMW World Final, finishing in eighteenth position. For 2006, he returned to the series for two races only due to commitments in other championships, winning both of them.

=== Formula Renault ===
Al Fardan competed in the Formula Asia V6 Renault championship in 2006, finishing the championship in sixth place with one win despite missing the last four races of the season. He again raced for the Meritus team. He returned to the series for 2009 and won the opening four races before the remainder of the season was cancelled, leaving him champion by default.

=== Toyota Racing Series ===
Al Fardan also drove in the New Zealand-based Toyota Racing Series for 2006, again employed by Meritus. Scoring one race victory, the New Zealand Grand Prix, he finished thirteenth in the championship. He remained in the formula for 2007, although he switched teams to Mark Petch Motorsport. In this year he won two races and moved up to eleventh place in the championship. It was a hectic season for Al Fardan, as he also competed in British Formula 3 on the other side of the world.

=== Formula Three ===
Al Fardan moved to the National Class of the British Formula 3 Championship for 2007 (in addition to his TRS commitments), where he established himself as a frontrunner in the series. He finished third in the championship for the Performance Racing team, despite not winning a race.

Over the winter of 2007–08, he moved to the Asian Formula Three Championship, driving for a national team sponsored by the Arabian bank Gulf House Finance. He won both rounds of the season-opener at the Sepang circuit in Malaysia, and two further races, but then accused the team of fastest man, Frédéric Vervisch, of cheating. He declined to make a protest preferring to walk away. He finished fourth in the championship. Following his performance in 2007, Toyota F1 test driver Kamui Kobayashi tipped him to become the first Middle Eastern driver to make it to Formula One.

Al Fardan moved to the German ATS Formel 3 Cup for 2008, where he was placed eleventh in the final standings, although his season was disrupted by injury.

=== GP2 Series ===
Al Fardan signed for the iSport International team to compete in the 2008–09 GP2 Asia Series season, becoming the first Bahraini and Arabian driver to race at this level. His backing from Gulf Finance House also meant that the team changed its name to GFH Team iSport for the duration of the championship. He finished 20th in the championship standings, scoring two points. He has not raced since, despite being linked to a 2010 Auto GP drive with DAMS.

== Racing record ==
=== Career summary ===
Season	Series	Team name	Races	Poles	Wins	Points	Position
2004	Formula BMW Asia	Belgravia Motorsport	?	?	?	80	8th
2005	Formula BMW Asia	Team Meritus	14	2	4	148	**3rd**
2005	Formula BMW World Final	Team Meritus	1	0	0	N/A	18th
2006	Formula V6 Asia	Team Meritus	8	1	1	66	6th
2006	Toyota Racing Series	Team Meritus	14	0	1	593	13th
2006	Formula BMW Asia	Team Meritus	2	2	0	40	10th
2007	British Formula 3 Championship - National Class	Performance Racing Europe	21	0	0	182	**3rd**
2007	Toyota Racing Series	Mark Petch Motorsport	12	0	2	530	11th
2007-08	Asian Formula Three Championship	Team GFH Bahrain	8	3	4	126	4th
2008	ATS Formel 3 Cup	Franz Wöss Racing	11	0	0	13	11th
2008-09	GP2 Asia Series	iSport International	11	0	0	2	20th
2008-09	Speedcar Series	Durango	2	0	0	0	23rd
2009	Formula V6 Asia	Dyna Ten Motorsport	4	1	4	61	**1st**

=== Complete GP2 Asia Series results ===
(key) (Races in bold indicate pole position) (Races in italics indicate fastest lap)

Year	Entrant	1	2	3	4	5	6	7	8	9	10	11	12	DC	Points
2008–09	GFH Team iSport	CHN; FEA; 15	CHN; SPR; Ret	UAE; FEA; Ret	UAE; SPR; C	BHR; FEA; 12	BHR; SPR; Ret	QAT; FEA; Ret	QAT; SPR; Ret	MAL; FEA; 9	MAL; SPR; 5	BHR; FEA; Ret	BHR; SPR; 17	20th	2

Sporting positions
Preceded by Simon Gamble	Winner of the New Zealand Grand Prix; 2006	Succeeded by Daniel Gaunt
Preceded by James Grunwell	Formula V6 Asia champion 2009	Succeeded by Incumbent
