= Diego Nunes (racing driver) =

Brazilian racing driver (born 1986)

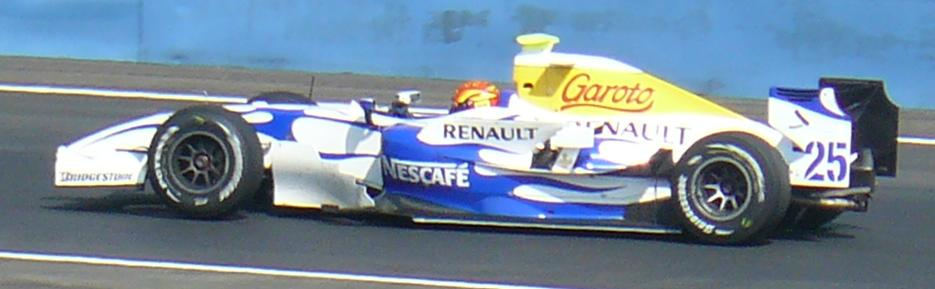
- Nationality: (Brazil) Brazilian
- Born: Diego Gomes Nunes; July 12, 1986 (age 40) Curitiba (Brazil)

TCR South America career
- Debut season: 2023
- Current team: Cobra Racing
- Car number: 70
- Wins: 1
- Podiums: 1
- Best finish: 1st

Previous series
- 2008–09 2008–2009–10 2006–07, 2009 2005–06 2002–06: GP2 Series; GP2 Asia Series; Euro/Italian Formula 3000; Formula Three Sudamericana; Formula Renault 2.0 Brazil

Championship titles
- 2022: Porsche Endurance Series

Diego Gomes Nunes (born July 12, 1986) is a Brazilian racing driver currently competing in TCR South America with Cobra Racing. Having previously raced in Stock Car Brazil. Nunes is the 2022 Porsche Endurance Series champion.

== Career ==
=== Formula Renault ===
Nunes began his car racing career by driving full-time in the Formula Renault 2.0 Brazil championship in 2003 and 2004, having competed in selected events in 2002. With a best result of ninth in the drivers' championship in 2004, Nunes moved on to concentrate on different motorsport series from 2005, but still returned to Brazilian FRenault for the occasional race in that year and the next.

=== Formula Three ===
Nunes switched to Formula Three Sudamericana for 2005, finishing fourth in the championship at his first attempt. In 2006, he took pole position for half of the races but was only able to win one, restricting him to third in the championship.

=== Formula 3000 ===
In 2006, Nunes competed in two races of the Euroseries 3000. For 2007, he moved to Europe full-time to drive a full season in the series. Employed by the former Formula One team, Minardi, he finished as runner-up in the championship.

=== GP2 Series ===
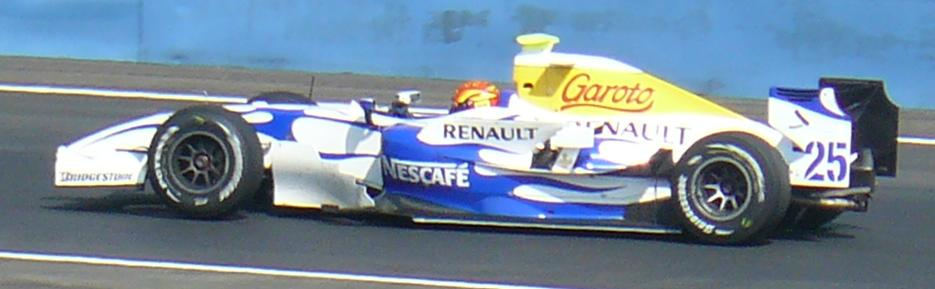
Nunes driving for David Price Racing at the Valencia round of the 2008 GP2 Series season.

Nunes was recruited by Adrián Campos to drive for his team in the inaugural GP2 Asia Series season in 2008, but switched to David Price Racing after the first round of the championship. This was because Price had fired his driver Andy Soucek, who had himself signed for the rival FMS International team for the GP2 Series proper that year. Nunes scored two points and finished nineteenth in the championship.

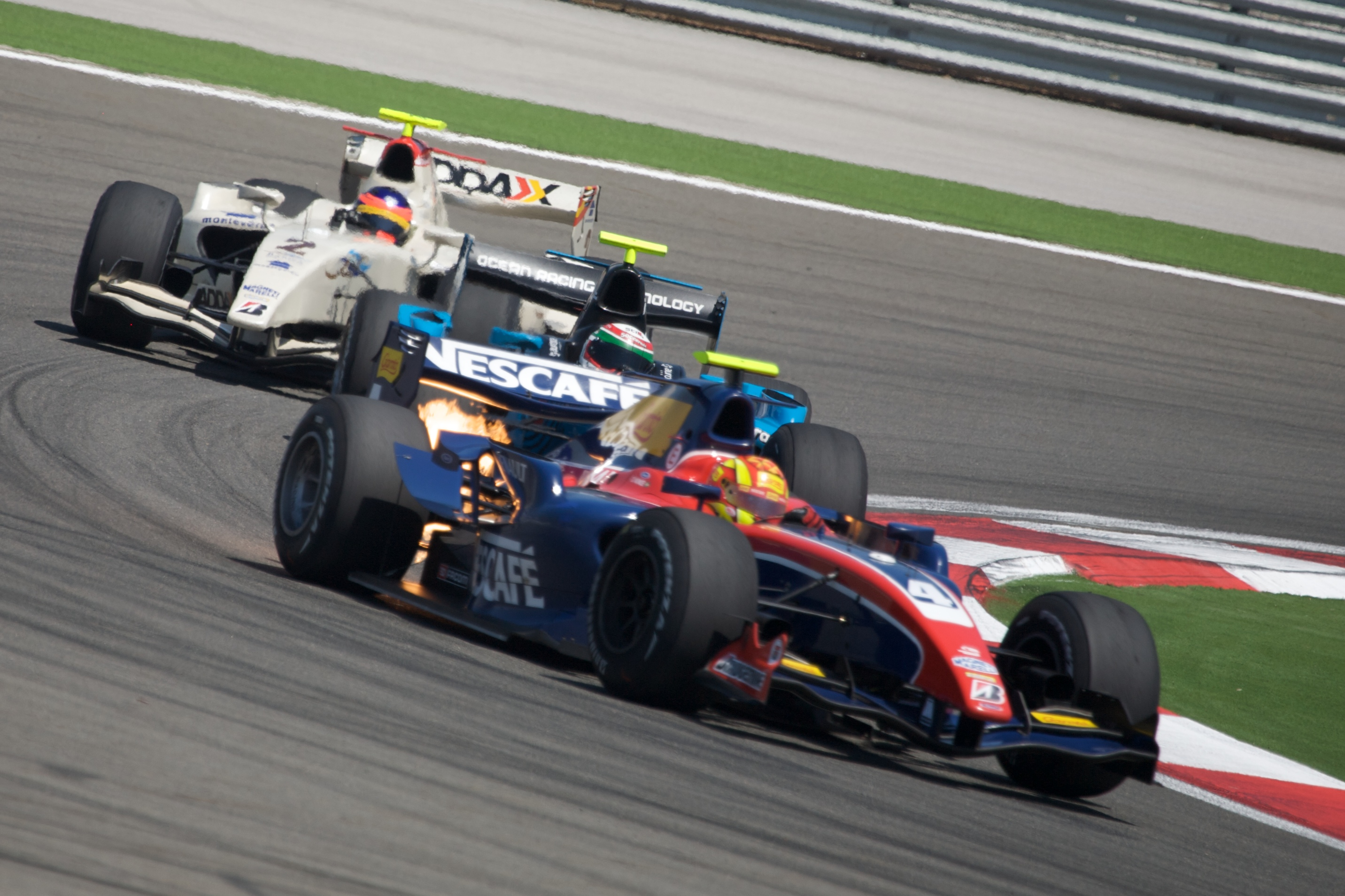
Nunes leading Álvaro Parente and Romain Grosjean at the Turkish round of the 2009 GP2 Series season.

Nunes continued with DPR for the 2008 GP2 Series season, where he was partnered by Michael Herck and Giacomo Ricci on his way to 22nd in the championship. For the 2009 championship, he switched to frontrunners iSport International alongside rookie Giedo van der Garde. He finished the championship in 20th place.

For the 2009–10 GP2 Asia Series season, Nunes partnered Luca Filippi at Team Meritus for the first round in Abu Dhabi, but was replaced by Alexander Rossi for the second Abu Dhabi round.

=== Stock Car Brasil ===
With his single-seater career petering out, Nunes returned to Brazil for 2010 to compete in the Stock Car Brasil championship, driving for the Bassani team once more. In his first year, driving a Peugeot 307 alongside first Rodrigo Sperafico and then Willian Starostik, he scored 43 points to finish 15th in the championship, capping his season with a win in the final race at Curitiba. He remained with the team for 2011 as the Peugeot teams upgraded to the 408 model, and was partnered by Denis Navarro, but was dropped in favour of Bruno Junqueira after scoring only 13 points in nine races.

=== TCR South America ===
Nunes transitioned to the TCR South America Touring Car Championship in 2023, competing for Cobra Racing in the Audi RS3.

== Racing record ==
=== Career summary ===
Season	Series	Team	Races	Wins	Poles	F/Laps	Podiums	Points	Position
2002	Formula Renault 2.0 Brazil	RS-Prop Car	3	0	0	0	0	0	NC
2003	Formula Renault 2.0 Brazil	Bassani-Prop Car	12	0	0	0	0	26	18th
2004	Formula Renault 2.0 Brazil	Full Time Sports	11	0	1	1	1	76	9th
2005	Formula Renault 2.0 Brazil	Gramacho Racing	3	0	0	0	1	44	12th
2005	Formula 3 Sudamericana	Bassani Racing	18	3	1	1	4	72	4th
2006	Formula Renault 2.0 Brazil	Bassani Racing	1	1	1	1	1	32	16th
2006	Formula 3 Sudamericana	Bassani Racing	16	2	8	3	7	78	**3rd**
2006	Euroseries 3000	Minardi by GP Racing	2	0	0	0	0	6	15th
2006	F3000 Italian Championship	Minardi by GP Racing	2	0	0	0	0	6	15th
2007	Euroseries 3000	Minardi by GP Racing	16	4	1	1	10	77	**2nd**
2007	F3000 Italian Championship	Minardi by GP Racing	8	1	1	1	4	32	**2nd**
2008	GP2 Series	DPR	20	0	0	0	0	3	22nd
2008	GP2 Asia Series	DPR	8	0	0	0	0	2	19th
2008	GP2 Asia Series	Barwa International Campos Team	1	0	0	0	0	2	19th
2008–09	GP2 Asia Series	Piquet GP	11	2	0	1	2	24	8th
2009	GP2 Series	iSport International	20	0	0	1	1	8	20th
2009	Euroseries 3000	Team Lazarus	2	0	0	0	0	5	15th
2009–10	GP2 Asia Series	MalaysiaQi-Meritus.com	2	0	0	0	0	0	NC
2010	Stock Car Brasil	RC3 Bassani Racing	12	1	0	0	1	43	15th
2011	Stock Car Brasil	Bassani Racing	9	0	0	0	0	13	23rd
2012	Stock Car Brasil	Hot Car Competições	12	0	0	0	0	61	20th
2012	Brasileiro de Marcas	Bassani Racing	16	0	0	2	4	192	4th
2013	Stock Car Brasil	RC3 Bassani	12	0	0	0	0	71	17th
2014	Stock Car Brasil	C2 Team	21	0	0	0	0	81	20th
2014	Brasileiro de Marcas	C2 Team	1	0	0	0	0	0	NC
2015	Stock Car Brasil	Vogel Motorsport	21	0	0	0	2	139	14th
2016	Stock Car Brasil	União Química Basssani	21	1	0	1	3	189	7th
2016	Porsche Endurance Series - Cup	N/A	1	0	0	0	0	20	42nd
2016	Porsche Endurance Series - Challenge	N/A	1	0	0	0	0	0	NC
2017	Stock Car Brasil	Full Time Bassani	21	0	0	0	0	114	15th
2017	Porsche Endurance Series - Challenge	N/A	1	0	1	1	0	21	16th
2018	Stock Car Brasil	Full Time Bassani	21	0	0	3	1	66	14th
2018	Porsche Endurance Series - 3.8	N/A	1	0	0	0	1	55	14th
2019	Stock Car Brasil	KTF Sports	21	0	0	0	1	175	11th
2020	Stock Car Brasil	Blau Motorsport	18	1	0	3	3	203	11th
2020	Porsche Endurance Series - Cup	N/A	1	0	0	0	0	56	19th
2020	GT Sprint Race Special Edition - Am	N/A	6	2	0	2	3	101	**2nd**
2021	Stock Car Pro Series	Blau Motorsport	23	0	0	1	1	226	10th
2021	Porsche Endurance Series - Cup	N/A	3	0	0	0	0	92	13th
2022	Stock Car Pro Series	Blau Motorsport	22	1	0	1	2	158	16th
2023	TCR South America Touring Car Championship	Cobra Racing Team	18	1	0	2	1	183	11th
2023	TCR World Tour	Cobra Racing Team	4	0	0	0	0	2	55th
2023	TCR Brazil Touring Car Championship	Cobra Racing Team	11	2	0	2	2	184	7th
2023	Stock Car Pro Series	Blau Motorsport	2	0	0	0	0	2	37th
2024	TCR South America Touring Car Championship	Squadra Martino	1	0	0	0	0	4	57th
2024	TCR Brazil Touring Car Championship	Squadra Martino	1	0	0	0	0	4	31st
2025	GT Cup Open Europe	LMR Motorsport							
2025	GT World Challenge America	AF Corse USA							
2026	Porsche Carrera Cup Brasil								

=== Complete Euroseries 3000 results ===
(key) (Races in bold indicate pole position) (Races in italics indicate fastest lap)

Year	Entrant	1	2	3	4	5	6	7	8	9	10	11	12	13	14	15	16	17	18	DC	Points
2006	Minardi by GP Racing	ADR	ADR	IMO	IMO	SPA	SPA	HUN	HUN	MUG	MUG	SIL	SIL	CAT	CAT	VLL	VLL	MIS; 1; 4	MIS; 2; 6	15th	6
2007	Minardi by GP Racing	VLL; 1; 3	VLL; 2; 5	HUN; 1; 2	HUN; 2; 5	MAG; 1; 2	MAG; 2; 1	MUG; 1; 3	MUG; 2; 1	NÜR; 1; 3	NÜR; 2; 6	SPA; 1; 6	SPA; 2; 1	**MNZ**; **1** Ret	MNZ; 2 Ret	CAT; 1; 1	CAT; 2; 2			2nd	77
2009	Team Lazarus	ALG; 1; 4	ALG; 2; 7	MAG; 1	MAG; 2	DON; 1	DON; 2	ZOL; 1	ZOL; 2	VAL; 1	VAL; 2	VLL; 1	VLL; 2	MNZ; 1	MNZ; 2					15th	5

=== Complete GP2 Series results ===
(key) (Races in bold indicate pole position) (Races in italics indicate fastest lap)

Year	Entrant	1	2	3	4	5	6	7	8	9	10	11	12	13	14	15	16	17	18	19	20	DC	Points
2008	DPR	CAT; FEA; 15	CAT; SPR; 16	IST; FEA; 13	IST; SPR; 10	MON; FEA; 15	MON; SPR; 9	MAG; FEA; 11	MAG; SPR; Ret	SIL; FEA; 17	SIL; SPR; Ret	HOC; FEA; Ret	HOC; SPR; Ret	HUN; FEA; 12	HUN; SPR; 15	VAL; FEA; 10	VAL; SPR; 4	SPA; FEA; 12	SPA; SPR; Ret	MNZ; FEA; Ret	MNZ; SPR; 16	22nd	3
2009	iSport International	CAT; FEA; 11	CAT; SPR; 8	MON; FEA; Ret	MON; SPR; 14	IST; FEA; 11	IST; SPR; 11	SIL; FEA; 11	SIL; SPR; Ret	NÜR; FEA; Ret	NÜR; SPR; 11	HUN; FEA; Ret	HUN; SPR; 15	VAL; FEA; 11	VAL; SPR; 5	SPA; FEA; 9	SPA; SPR; 3	MNZ; FEA; 10	MNZ; SPR; Ret	ALG; FEA; 12	ALG; SPR; 5	20th	8

==== Complete GP2 Asia Series results ====
(key) (Races in bold indicate pole position) (Races in italics indicate fastest lap)

Year	Entrant	1	2	3	4	5	6	7	8	9	10	11	12	DC	Points
2008	Campos Grand Prix	DUB1; FEA; 12	DUB1; SPR; DNS											20th	2
2008	David Price Racing			SEN; FEA; Ret	SEN; SPR; 10	SEP; FEA; 10	SEP; SPR; 13	BHR; FEA; 7	BHR; SPR; Ret	DUB2; FEA; 17	DUB2; SPR; 12			20th	2
2008–09	Piquet GP	SHI; FEA; 12	SHI; SPR; Ret	DUB; FEA; Ret	DUB; SPR; C	BHR1; FEA; 13	BHR1; SPR; 22	LSL; FEA; 11	LSL; SPR; 12	SEP; FEA; 1	SEP; SPR; 4	BHR2; FEA; 1	BHR2; SPR; 6	8th	24
2009–10	MalaysiaQi-Meritus.com	YMC1; FEA; Ret	YMC1; SPR; 13	YMC2; FEA	YMC2; SPR	BHR1; FEA	BHR1; SPR	BHR2; FEA	BHR2; SPR					28th	0

=== Complete Stock Car Brasil results ===
(key) (Races in bold indicate pole position) (Races in italics indicate fastest lap)

Year	Team	Car	1	2	3	4	5	6	7	8	9	10	11	12	13	14	15	16	17	18	19	20	21	Pos	Points
2010	RC3 Bassani	Peugeot 307	INT; 12	CTB; 18	VEL; 5	RIO; 21	RBP; Ret	SAL; Ret	INT; 17	CGD; Ret	LON; Ret	SCZ; 14	BSB; Ret	CTB; 1										15th	43
2011	RC3 Bassani	Peugeot 408	CTB; 18	INT; 18	RBP; 18	VEL; 9	CGD; 23	RIO; 10	INT; Ret	SAL; Ret	SCZ; Ret	LON	BSB	VEL										23rd	13
2012	Bardahl Hot Car	Chevrolet Sonic	INT; 22	CTB; 15	VEL; 10	RBP; 9	LON; 16	RIO; Ret	SAL; DSQ	CAS; 11	TAR; 19	CTB; 15	BSB; 12	INT; Ret										20th	61
2013	RC3 Bassani	Peugeot 408	INT; 16	CUR; Ret	TAR; Ret	SAL; 20	BRA; 22	CAS; 4	RBP; 15	CAS; 11	VEL; 7	CUR; 11	BRA; 13	INT; Ret										17th	71
2014	C2 Team	Chevrolet Sonic	INT; 1	SCZ; 1	SCZ; 2	BRA; 1	BRA; 2	GOI; 1	GOI; 2	INT; 1	CAS; 1	CAS; 2	CUR; 1	CUR; 2	VEL; 1	VEL; 2	SAL; 1	SAL; 2	CUR; 1	CUR; 2	TAR; 1	TAR; 2	BRA; 1	NC	N/A
