= Nico Hülkenberg =

German racing driver (born 1987)

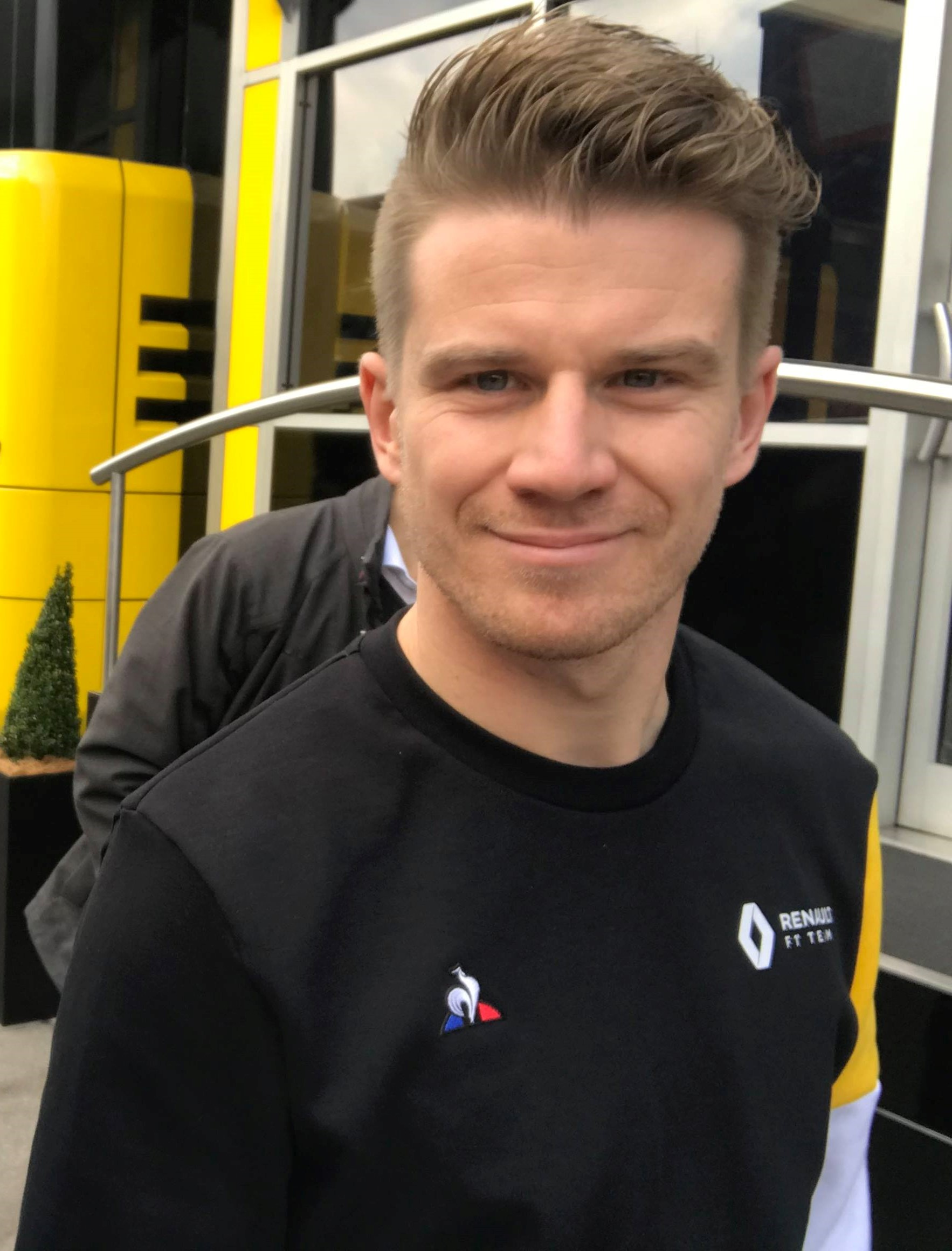
- Hülkenberg in 2019
- Born: Nicolas Hülkenberg; 19 August 1987 (age 39); Emmerich am Rhein, North Rhine-Westphalia, West Germany
- Spouse: Eglė Ruškytė (m. 2022)
- Children: 1

Formula One World Championship career
- Nationality: (Germany) German
- 2026 team: Audi
- Car number: 27
- Entries: 274 (269 starts)
- Championships: 0
- Wins: 0
- Podiums: 1
- Career points: 636
- Pole positions: 1
- Fastest laps: 2
- First entry: 2010 Bahrain Grand Prix
- Last entry: 2026 São Paulo Grand Prix
- 2025 position: 11th (51 pts)

24 Hours of Le Mans career
- Years: 2015
- Teams: Porsche
- Best finish: 1st (2015)
- Class wins: 1 (2015)

Previous series
- 2009; 2008–2009; 2007–2008; 2006–2007; 2006; 2005: GP2 Series; GP2 Asia Series; F3 Euro Series; A1 Grand Prix; German F3; Formula BMW ADAC

Championship titles
- 2009; 2008; 2005: GP2 Series; F3 Euro Series; Formula BMW ADAC
Medal record
Formula racing
Representing Germany
A1 Grand Prix
| Winner | World Cup | 2006–07 |
| Gold medal – first place | 2006–07 Netherlands | Feature |
| Gold medal – first place | 2006–07 Malaysia | Feature |
| Gold medal – first place | 2006–07 New Zealand | Sprint |
| Gold medal – first place | 2006–07 New Zealand | Feature |
| Gold medal – first place | 2006–07 Australia | Sprint |
| Gold medal – first place | 2006–07 Australia | Feature |
| Gold medal – first place | 2006–07 South Africa | Sprint |
| Gold medal – first place | 2006–07 South Africa | Feature |
| Gold medal – first place | 2006–07 Great Britain | Feature |
| Silver medal – second place | 2006–07 Malaysia | Sprint |
| Silver medal – second place | 2006–07 Indonesia | Feature |
| Silver medal – second place | 2006–07 Great Britain | Sprint |
| Bronze medal – third place | 2006–07 Shanghai | Sprint |
| Bronze medal – third place | 2006–07 Shanghai | Feature |
- Website: www.nicohulkenberg.net

Nicolas Hülkenberg (German pronunciation: [ˈniːko ˈhʏlkənbɛɐ̯k]; born 19 August 1987) is a German racing driver who competes in Formula One for Audi. In endurance racing, Hülkenberg won the 24 Hours of Le Mans in 2015 with Porsche.

Born and raised in Emmerich am Rhein, Hülkenberg began competitive kart racing at age 10, winning several national titles before graduating to junior formulae in 2005. Hülkenberg won his first championship in Formula BMW ADAC that year. He then won the 2006–07 A1 Grand Prix series, representing Germany. After winning the 2007 Masters of Formula 3 and the 2008 Formula 3 Euro Series, Hülkenberg progressed to the GP2 Series in 2009 with ART; he won the championship in his debut season, becoming the third driver to win the GP2/Formula 2 title in their rookie season after Nico Rosberg and Lewis Hamilton.

Following test driver roles from 2007 to 2009, Hülkenberg signed for Williams in 2010, making his Formula One debut at the Bahrain Grand Prix. After claiming his maiden pole position at the Brazilian Grand Prix, he was replaced by Pastor Maldonado at the end of the season. He joined Force India as a reserve driver in 2011. He was then promoted to a full-time seat for the 2012 season. In 2013, he competed for Sauber, before returning to Force India in 2014 to partner Sergio Pérez. After his 2015 and 2016 campaigns at Force India, Hülkenberg switched to Renault for 2017. Replaced by Esteban Ocon at the end of 2019, he returned to Force India—then known as Racing Point and later re-branded as Aston Martin—as a reserve driver from 2020 to 2022; Hülkenberg substituted for Pérez and Lance Stroll at three Grands Prix in 2020, and for Sebastian Vettel at two in 2022. He returned as a full-time driver with Haas in 2023 and 2024, alongside Kevin Magnussen. Hülkenberg re-joined Sauber for his 2025 campaign, where he achieved his maiden podium at the British Grand Prix, ahead of their acquisition by Audi in 2026.

As of the 2026 São Paulo Grand Prix, Hülkenberg has achieved one pole position, two fastest laps, and one podium finish in Formula One. He holds the Formula One records for the most starts without a win (269) and the most starts before a podium (239), before breaking the podium-less streak at the 2025 British Grand Prix. Hülkenberg is contracted to remain at Audi until at least the end of the 2027 season.

== Early and personal life ==
Hülkenberg was born in Emmerich am Rhein, North Rhine-Westphalia, West Germany to Klaus Dieter Hülkenberg and Susanne Hülkenberg. Dieter Hülkenberg owns a shipping company, Hülkenberg Spedition e. K, based in Emmerich am Rhein. Hülkenberg trained as a freight forwarding agent at his father's company. He is fluent in German, Dutch, French, and English.

Hülkenberg lives in Monaco. He is married to Lithuanian fashion designer Eglė Ruškytė, having been in a relationship with her since 2015. Together, they have one daughter born in 2021.

Hülkenberg was previously managed by Willi Weber, the long-time manager of Michael Schumacher. Weber predicted that Hülkenberg would be ready for Formula One by 2008. He also praised Hülkenberg as an "unbelievable talent" and said he reminded him of Schumacher as a young driver. He also stated that he nicknamed him "The Hulk", after the fictional superhero, in reference to Hülkenberg changing his personality whilst at the wheel.

== Junior racing career ==
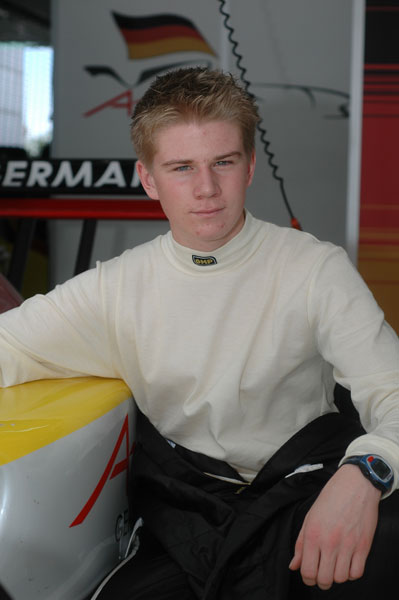
Hülkenberg, as a driver for A1 Team Germany, in 2006

=== Karting ===
Hülkenberg made his karting debut in 1997, at the age of 10. In 2002 he was German Junior Karting Champion and the following year he won the German Kart Championship.

=== Formula BMW ===
Hülkenberg made his German Formula BMW debut in 2005, dominating the championship and winning the title comfortably. He finished first in the Formula BMW world final but was stripped of the win after it was claimed he had brake-tested his rivals during a safety car period.

=== A1 Grand Prix ===
Hülkenberg also joined the German A1 Grand Prix team for the 2006–07 season. Nine wins in his rookie season made him the most successful driver in A1GP history. It meant he almost single-handedly won Germany the championship with 128 points, 35 more than Team New Zealand.

=== Formula Three ===
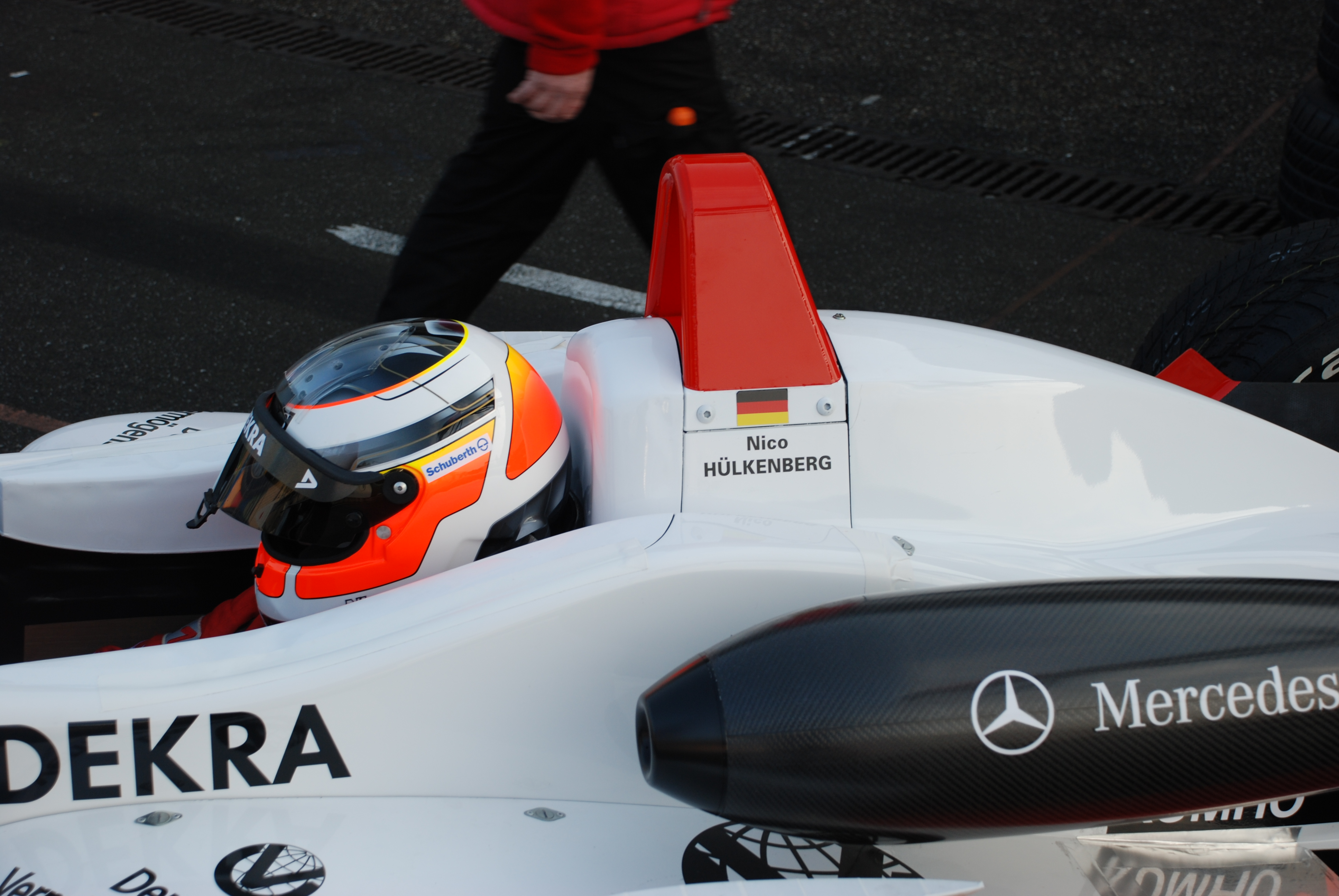
Hülkenberg won seven races en route to the 2008 Formula 3 Euro Series title.

Hülkenberg finished fifth in the German Formula Three Championship (ATS Formel 3 Cup) in 2006. For 2007 he switched to the Formula 3 Euro Series with the ASM team that had taken Lewis Hamilton and Paul di Resta to the last two championships. His first win came at the Norisring from 18th on the grid, he won again in the rain at Zandvoort and added a third at the Nürburgring. But he ran into trouble at Magny-Cours, being penalised in qualifying for passing the chequered flag twice, and crashing into Filip Salaquarda in the race. Hülkenberg finished his rookie season 3rd in the championship, with four wins and 72 points.

Hülkenberg won the non-championship Masters of Formula 3 race at Zolder from teammate (and F3 Euro Series championship leader) Romain Grosjean after Grosjean stalled at the start. Hülkenberg won the Formula 3 Euro Series championship in 2008. He amassed 76 of his total of 85 points during the feature races on Saturdays, taking seven wins in the progress.

=== GP2 ===
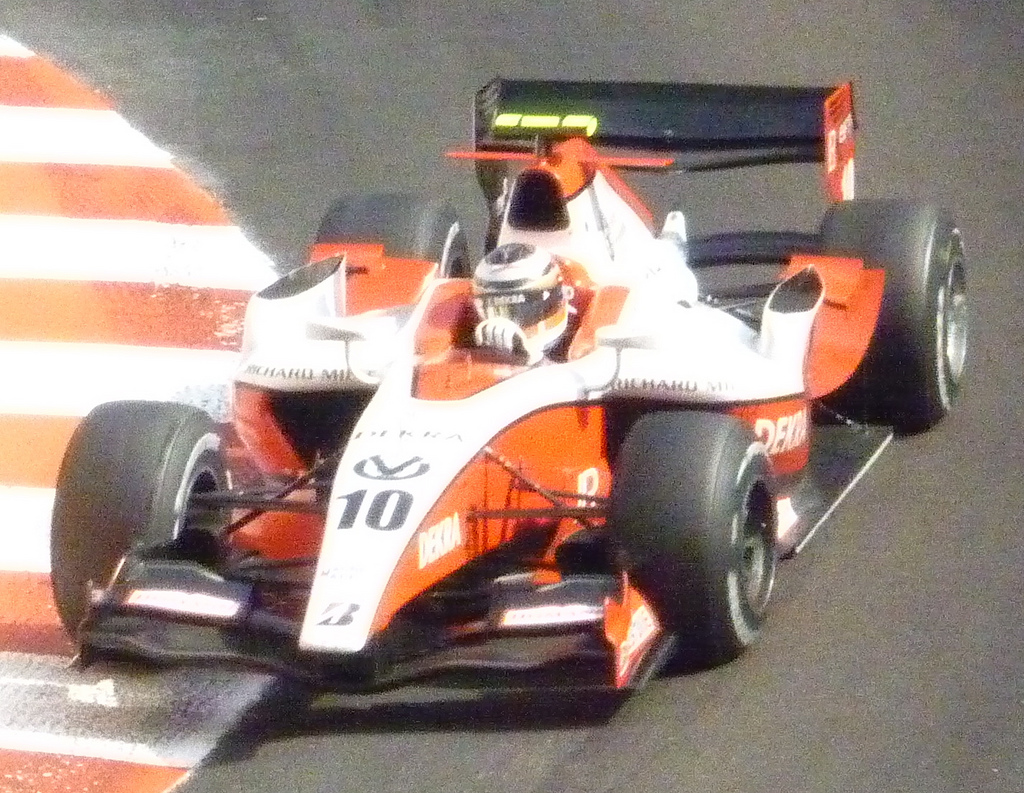
Hülkenberg driving for ART Grand Prix at the 2009 Monaco GP2 Series round

Hülkenberg made his GP2 Asia Series début for the ART Grand Prix team at the third round of the 2008–09 GP2 Asia Series in Bahrain, replacing Pastor Maldonado, and he took pole position on his first attempt. He finished both races in fourth place and this left him in seventh place in the championship. His second race weekend in Qatar, saw him become the first night race pole-sitter, and promptly turned that into becoming the first race-winner under lights after a dominant performance. Such was his performance that he ended up over thirteen seconds clear of second-placed driver Sergio Pérez. He finished third in the sprint race, taking his championship points tally to 27 from just four races. Despite this, Maldonado returned to the seat for the final two rounds and Hülkenberg finished sixth in the championship.

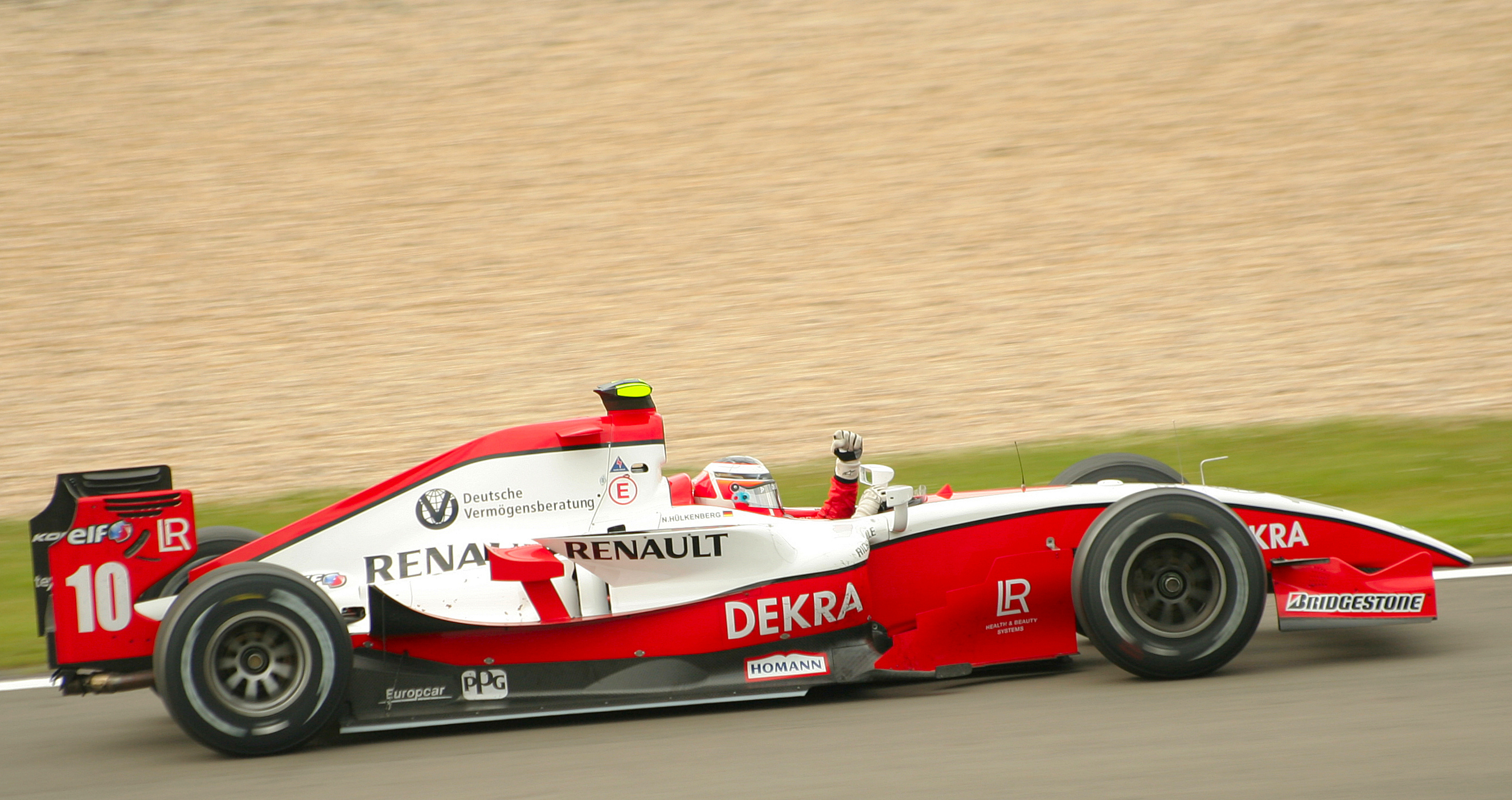
Hülkenberg celebrates victory at the 2009 Nürburgring GP2 Series round

Hülkenberg continued with ART into the 2009 GP2 Series, partnering Pastor Maldonado. He was point-less in the first round in Catalunya, then scored his first points in Monaco, including a podium in the sprint race, where the top eight on the starting grid are the feature race finishers in reversed order. At the following round at Istanbul Park he took his first pole position, but did not make the podium in either race. At Silverstone he again scored in both races, including a podium in the sprint race. He took his first win in dominant fashion at his home round, starting from pole position and taking the fastest lap. In the sprint race he rose from eighth to win the race with the fastest lap, becoming the first driver to do the weekend double since Giorgio Pantano at Monza in the 2006 season. In doing so, he became only the second driver to complete the clean sweep, with pole position, two fastest laps and two wins, following Nelson Piquet Jr. who did so at the Hungaroring in 2006. Hülkenberg won again at the Hungaroring, in the feature race; again at Valencia, this time during the sprint race, having finished second while starting from pole in the feature race; then came home second in the Belgian feature race. He clinched the title with two races to spare, after a third-place finish in the Monza sprint race which gave him an unassailable 22-point lead heading into the final round, and in the process became the first driver to clinch the championship without the need for a final round decider. He became the third rookie GP2 champion after Nico Rosberg and Lewis Hamilton, and the second behind Hamilton to win the GP3/F3 title, and the GP2/F2 title in consecutive years. A fifth win followed at Algarve, allowing Hülkenberg to break the 100-point barrier, as he eventually won the title by 25 points from Vitaly Petrov. Worthy of note is that Hülkenberg ended the season 64 points clear of his teammate Pastor Maldonado, who would win the title the following season and take his Williams F1 race seat for the 2011 season.

== Formula One career ==
=== Test driver (2007–2009) ===
Hülkenberg first drove a Formula One car in a test for Williams in December 2007, following his first season in the Formula 3 Euro Series. His manager, Willi Weber, had organised the test after failing to conclude a deal with Renault boss Flavio Briatore. The two-day test was held at the Circuito de Jerez in Spain with Hülkenberg driving the FW29. He outpaced Williams driver Kazuki Nakajima and set laptimes 0.4 seconds slower than Nico Rosberg. Hülkenberg's performance at the test led Williams to sign him as a test driver; he completed further test sessions during 2008, driving the FW30. His test contract with Williams was extended for 2009, despite in-season tests being banned from that season. After winning the GP2 Series, he took part in a post-season test at Jerez in December, driving the FW31.

=== Williams (2010) ===
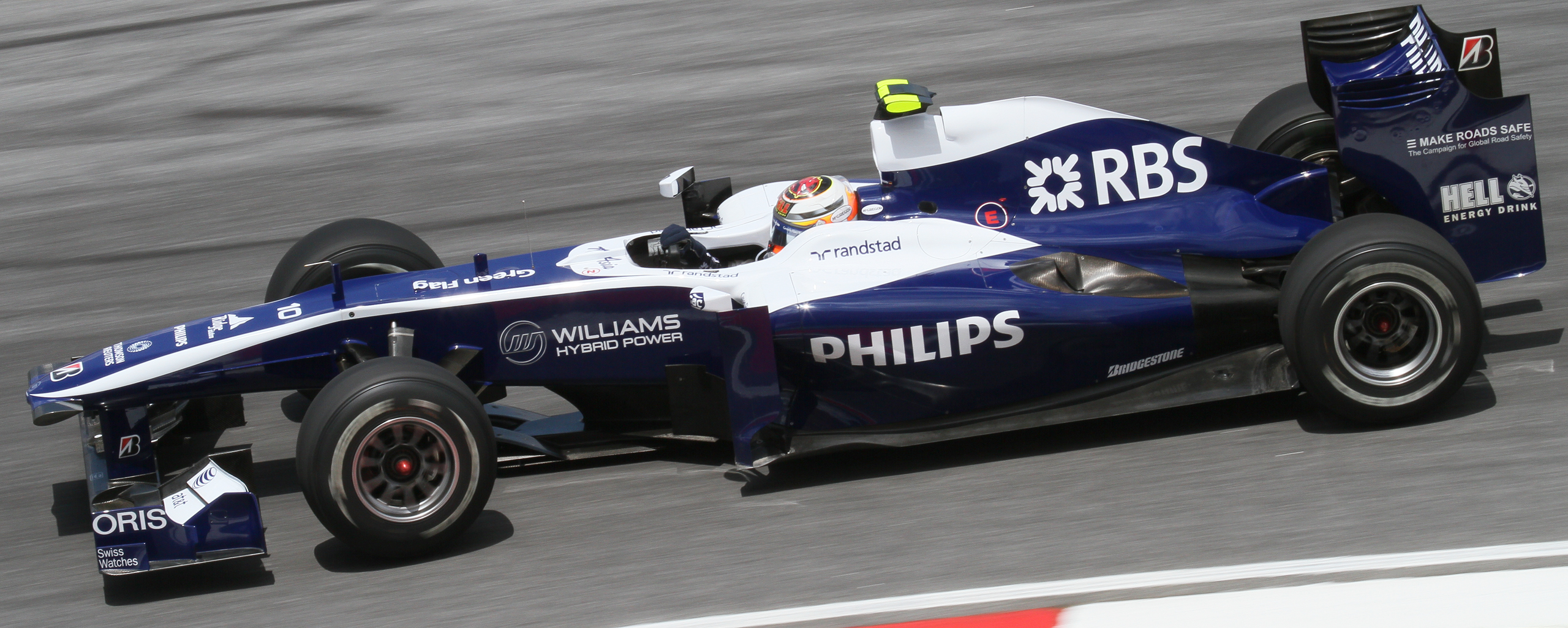
Hülkenberg scored his first World Championship point at the 2010 Malaysian Grand Prix.

In November 2009, Williams announced that Hülkenberg would be promoted to a race seat for 2010, partnering veteran race-winner Rubens Barrichello.

Hülkenberg made his debut at the Bahrain Grand Prix, qualifying thirteenth and recovering from an early spin to finish fourteenth. He was eliminated on the first lap of the Australian Grand Prix after Kamui Kobayashi crashed into a barrier and rebounded into Hülkenberg's car. At the third round, the Malaysian Grand Prix, he reached the third qualifying session (Q3) and qualified fifth ahead of Barrichello. Hülkenberg dropped places during the race but scored the first point of his career by finishing tenth. He retired from the Monaco Grand Prix after a heavy first-lap crash caused by a front wing failure. He reached Q3 and was running in tenth place at the European Grand Prix when a tyre failure caused terminal exhaust damage.

Hülkenberg's next points finish came at round ten, the British Grand Prix, where he finished tenth. He achieved a career-best sixth place at the Hungarian Grand Prix and scored further points at the Italian, Singapore and Korean Grands Prix, although his Japanese Grand Prix ended when Renault's Vitaly Petrov collided with Hülkenberg at the race start. In the rain-affected Brazilian Grand Prix qualifying session, Hülkenberg achieved his first pole position by a margin of 1.049 seconds over second-placed Sebastian Vettel. This was Williams's first pole since the 2005 European Grand Prix. He lost the lead on the opening lap of the race and was later passed by more competitive cars, eventually finishing eighth.

Hülkenberg ended the season fourteenth in the World Drivers' Championship, scoring 22 points to Barrichello's 47. Towards the end of the season, there were reports that Hülkenberg could lose his seat to GP2 Series champion Pastor Maldonado due to the financial backing Maldonado could bring to the team. A week after his pole position in Brazil, team principal Frank Williams confirmed that Hülkenberg would leave the team at the end of the season. On Hülkenberg's debut season, commentator and former F1 driver Martin Brundle remarked that he was a "future star" and that Williams were "crazy to let him go".

=== Force India (2011–2012) ===
==== 2011: Reserve driver ====
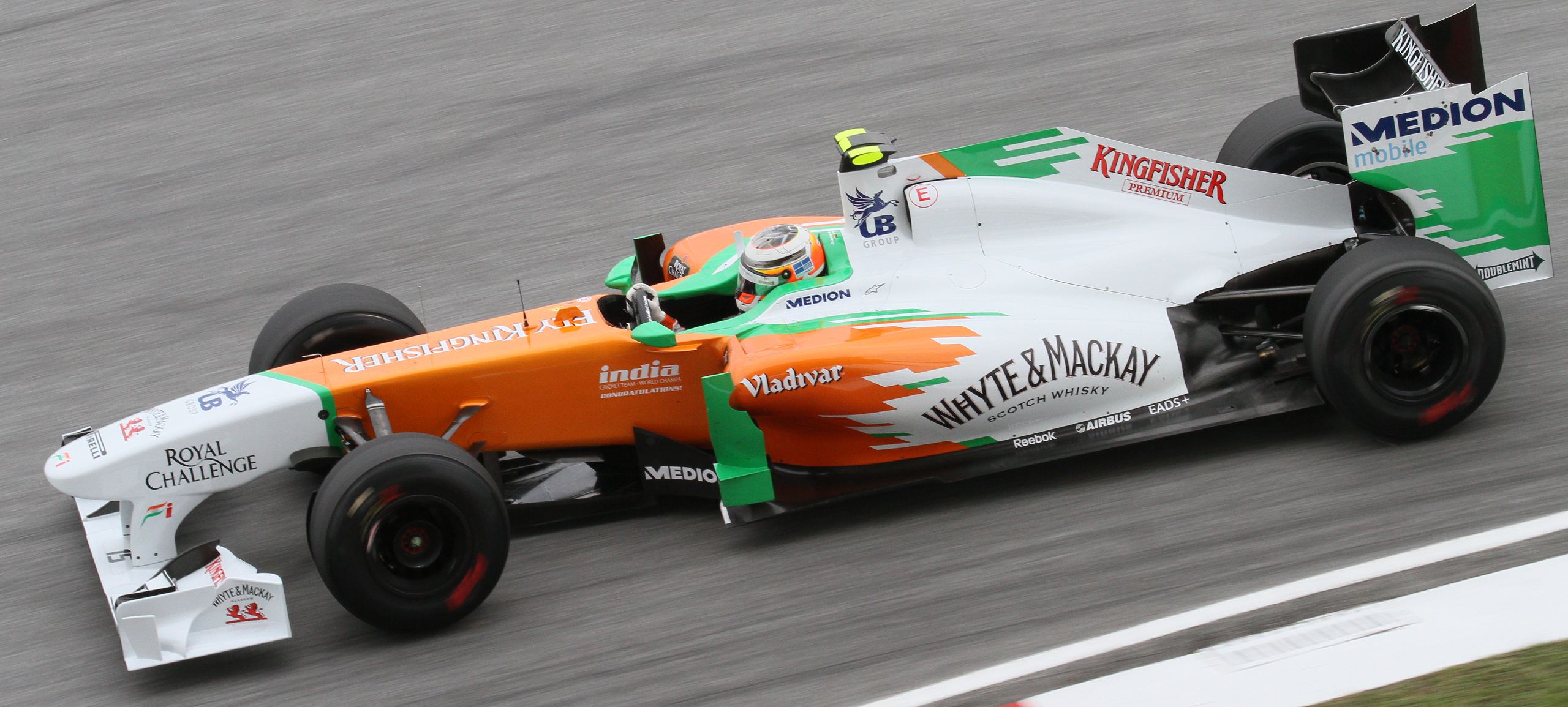
Hülkenberg as Force India's third driver at the 2011 Malaysian Grand Prix

In January 2011, Hülkenberg was announced as Force India's reserve driver for the 2011 season, serving underneath race drivers Paul di Resta and Adrian Sutil. Hülkenberg's manager Weber revealed that he turned down the offer of a race seat at the backmarker Virgin Racing team. Hülkenberg took part in the first practice (FP1) session at fourteen of the season's nineteen races, driving the VJM04.

==== 2012 ====
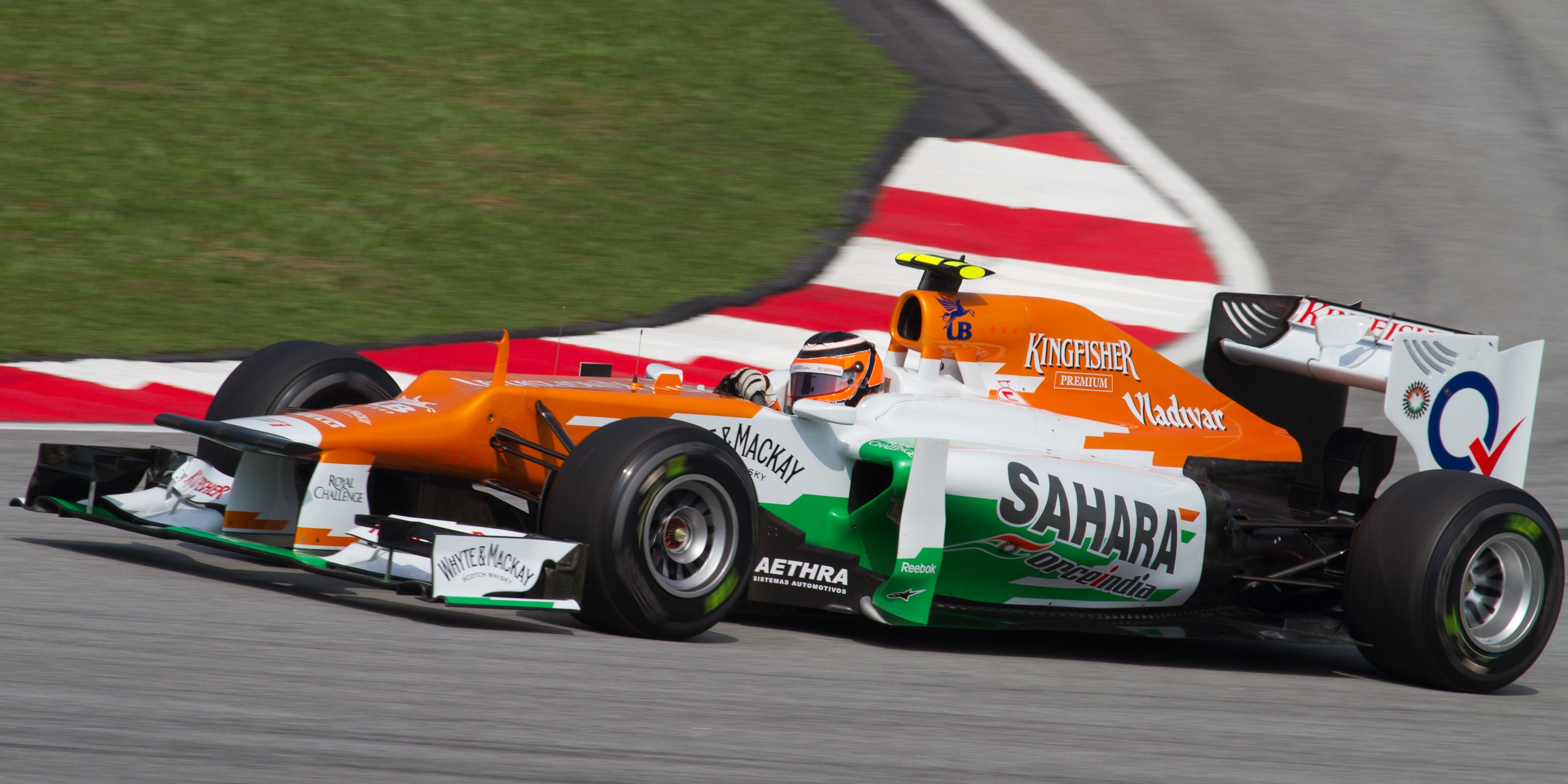
By the time of the 2012 Malaysian Grand Prix, Hülkenberg had been promoted to a full-time race seat.

In December 2011, Force India announced that Hülkenberg would be promoted to a race seat for 2012, partnering di Resta and replacing Sutil.

Hülkenberg qualified ninth for the Australian Grand Prix, six places ahead of di Resta, but his race ended on the first lap after picking up damage from a first-corner incident. He scored his first points for Force India the following weekend at the Malaysian Grand Prix; he finished ninth having started sixteenth. He scored further points at the Spanish and Monaco Grands Prix before achieving his career-best result at the European Grand Prix; he was promoted to fifth by a penultimate-lap collision between Lewis Hamilton and Pastor Maldonado. Hülkenberg started fourth at the German Grand Prix but dropped to ninth by the finish. He improved his best career result at the Belgian Grand Prix by finishing fourth; he started eleventh and ran as high as second having benefited from first-corner collisions ahead, but was later passed by Sebastian Vettel and Kimi Räikkönen.

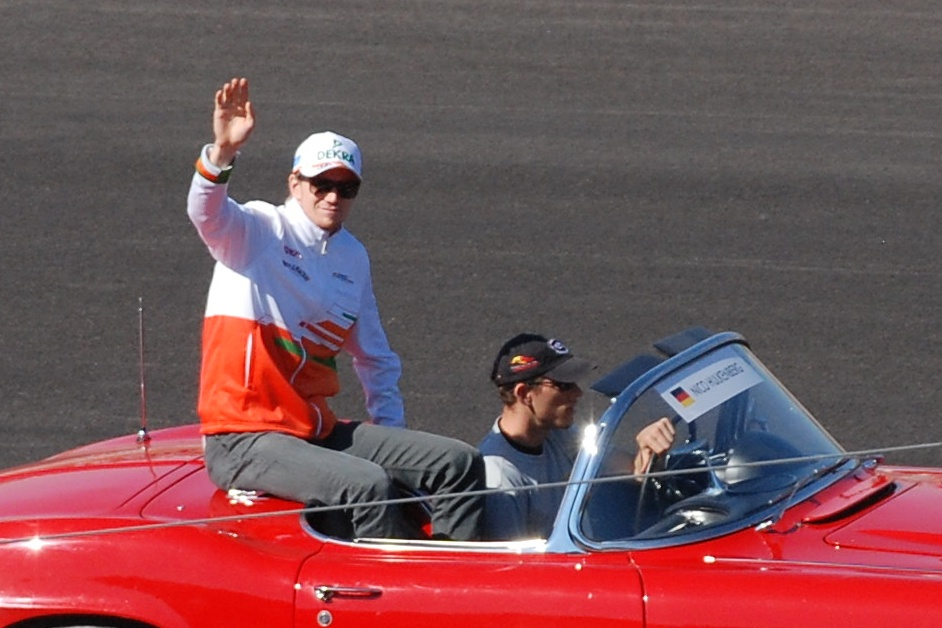
Hülkenberg at the 2012 United States Grand Prix

Hülkenberg's VJM05 broke down in qualifying at the Italian Grand Prix and later retired from the race with brake issues. He failed to score points at the Singapore Grand Prix but did set the fastest lap of the race. He achieved consecutive points finishes at the Japanese, Korean and Indian Grands Prix before retiring from the Abu Dhabi Grand Prix following a first-corner collision with teammate di Resta. Hülkenberg started sixth at the season-ending Brazilian Grand Prix but overtakes on Fernando Alonso and Jenson Button took him to first place by lap 19. He then led much of the race before a mistake allowed Lewis Hamilton past on lap 49. An attempt to overtake Hamilton ended in a collision, causing Hamilton's retirement and earning Hülkenberg a drive-through penalty. He ultimately finished the race fifth. Speaking in 2019, Hülkenberg commented that his "heart was bleeding" whilst watching a replay of this race, having lost a potential win.

Hülkenberg ended the season eleventh in the World Drivers' Championship, scoring 63 points to di Resta's 46 and qualifying ahead of di Resta at twelve of the twenty races. Keith Collantine at RaceFans rated Hülkenberg as the fifth-best driver of the season, remarking that "he deserves a competitive car".

=== Sauber (2013) ===
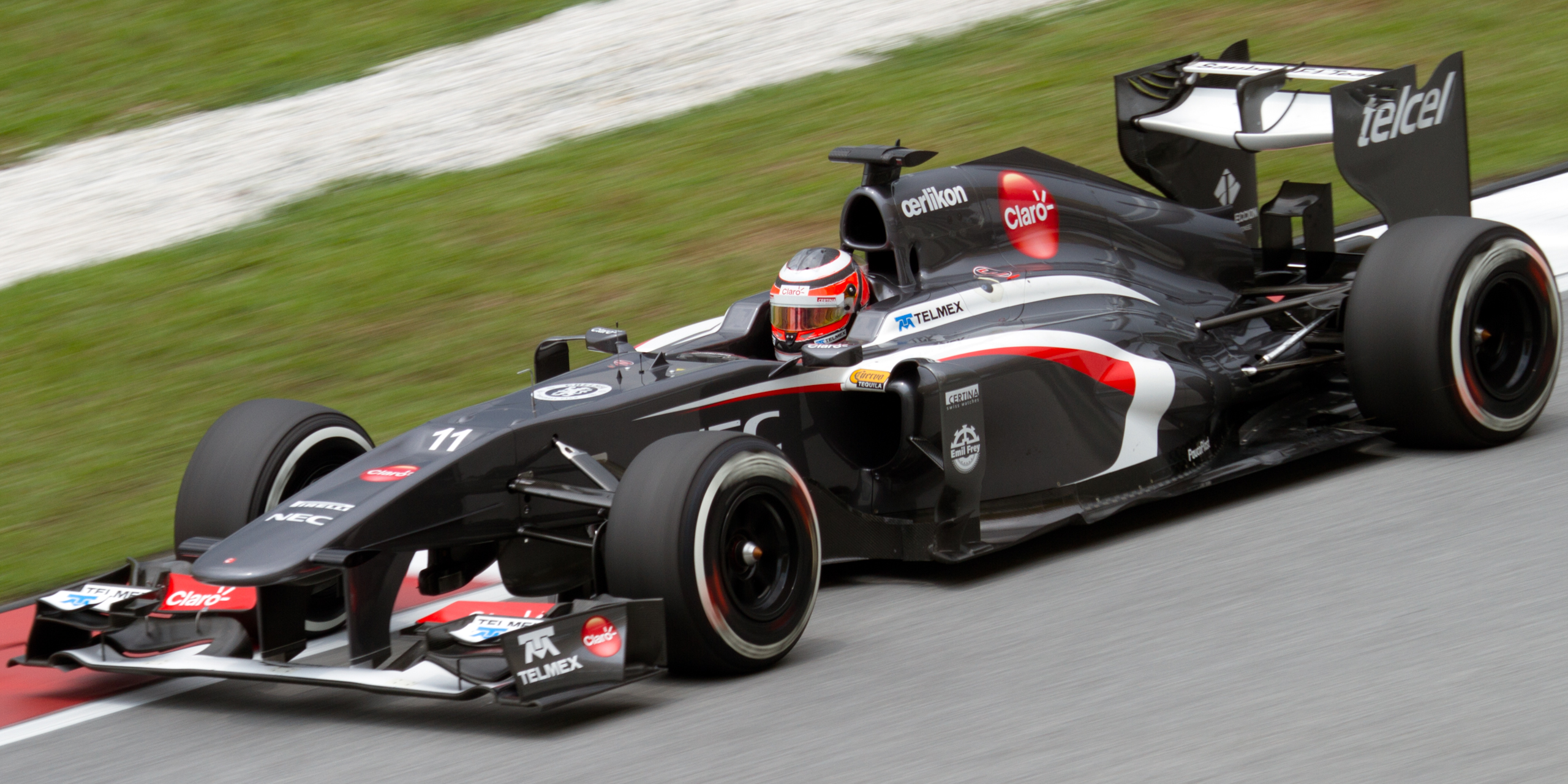
Hülkenberg at the 2013 Malaysian Grand Prix.

In October 2012, Sauber confirmed that they had signed Hülkenberg for the 2013 season to partner rookie Esteban Gutiérrez.

Hülkenberg failed to start the Australian Grand Prix due to a leak in the fuel system of his C32; he had qualified eleventh for the race but was withdrawn for safety reasons. He finished in the top ten at the Malaysian and Chinese Grands Prix but failed to score at the following four races, including a retirement from the Canadian Grand Prix due to a collision caused by Giedo van der Garde. Hülkenberg commented that he and the team were "not satisfied" with how their season had begun, but that the car had potential. He claimed two points with tenth-place finishes at the British and German Grands Prix, but finished outside the top ten at the Hungarian Grand Prix after receiving a drive-through penalty for speeding in the pit lane.

Hülkenberg had collected only seven points from the first eleven races, but his fortunes would change from the Italian Grand Prix onwards where he qualified a season-best third behind the leading Red Bulls and held off Nico Rosberg's Mercedes to finish the race fifth. He scored points at the following three races; this included matching his career-best result of fourth place at the Korean Grand Prix after a battle with Lewis Hamilton. He was set to finish eighth at the Indian Grand Prix but retired with a brake issue in the closing laps. He ended the season with consecutive top-ten finishes at the United States and Brazilian Grands Prix.

Hülkenberg finished the year tenth in the World Drivers' Championship, scoring 51 points to Gutiérrez's 6. Hülkenberg qualified ahead of Gutiérrez at all but one race (the Singapore Grand Prix). Writers at both The Guardian and BBC's Top Gear rated Hülkenberg as the third-best driver of 2013, with Paul Weaver at The Guardian describing him as "a serial overachiever in an unremarkable car".

=== Return to Force India (2014–2016) ===
==== 2014 ====
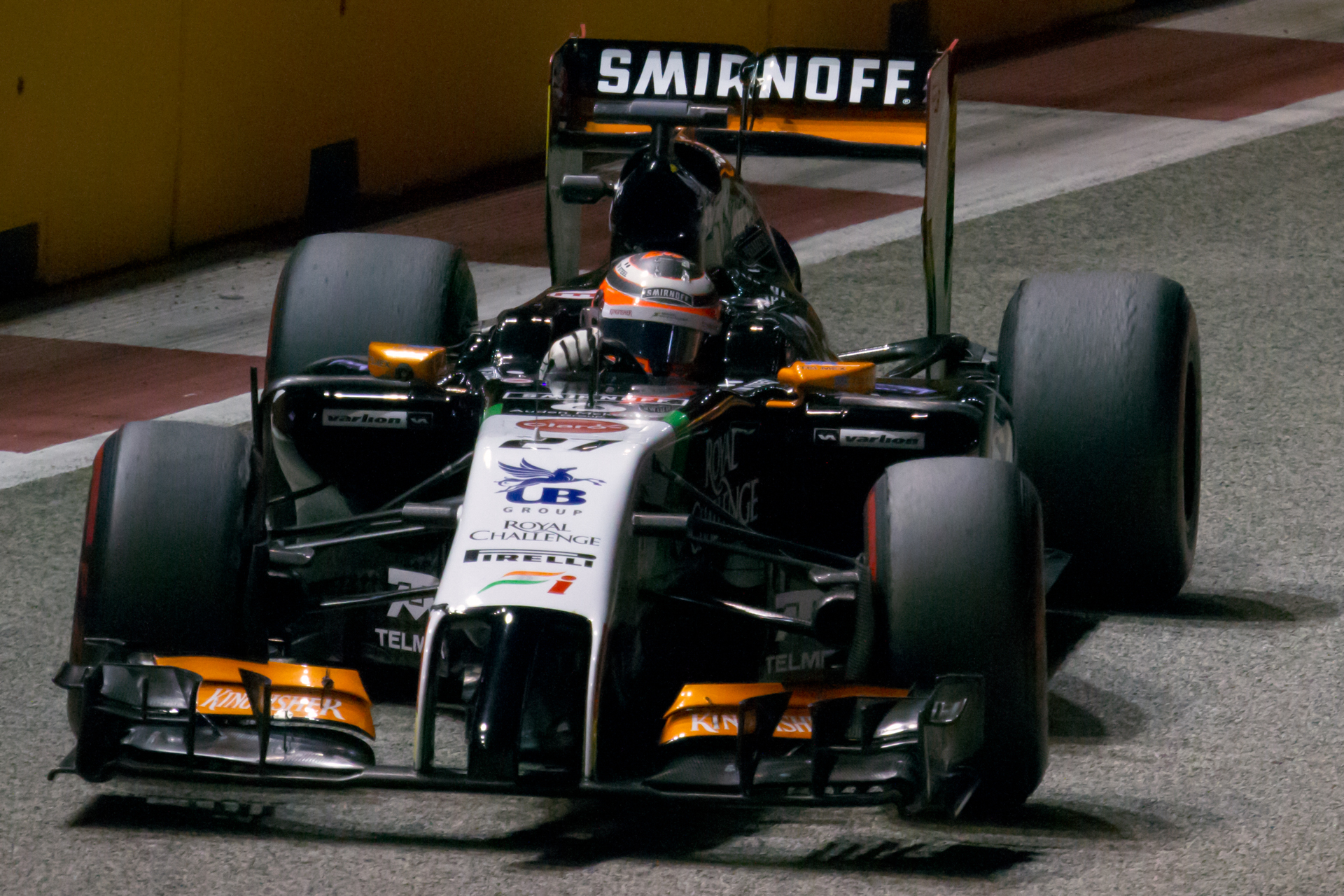
Hülkenberg at the 2014 Singapore Grand Prix

On 3 December 2013, Force India confirmed they had signed Hülkenberg for 2014 to race alongside Sergio Pérez. In the first round, Hülkenberg finished the Australian Grand Prix in seventh place – his first finish in Melbourne – but was promoted to sixth after the disqualification of second-placed Daniel Ricciardo. He later finished fifth at the Malaysian Grand Prix, spending a large amount of time in fourth place, holding off Ferrari's Fernando Alonso before being overtaken. Another fifth place at Bahrain put Hülkenberg in third place of the drivers' standings, behind the two Mercedes drivers, Lewis Hamilton and Nico Rosberg.

At the Chinese Grand Prix, Hülkenberg took sixth place, taking eight points. He fell to fourth place in the Drivers' Championship after Fernando Alonso finished in third place. Force India lost second in the Constructors' Championship to Red Bull Racing.

Consistent point scoring runs throughout the season meant that Hülkenberg finished the season in 9th place in the Drivers' Championship with 96 points, a career best, compared to his teammate's 59 points and helped Force India achieve sixth place in the Constructors' Championship, following the improvements of Williams and McLaren throughout the season. His best result of the season was fifth place, which he achieved four times.

In October 2014, Force India confirmed they had re-signed Hülkenberg for 2015.

==== 2015 ====
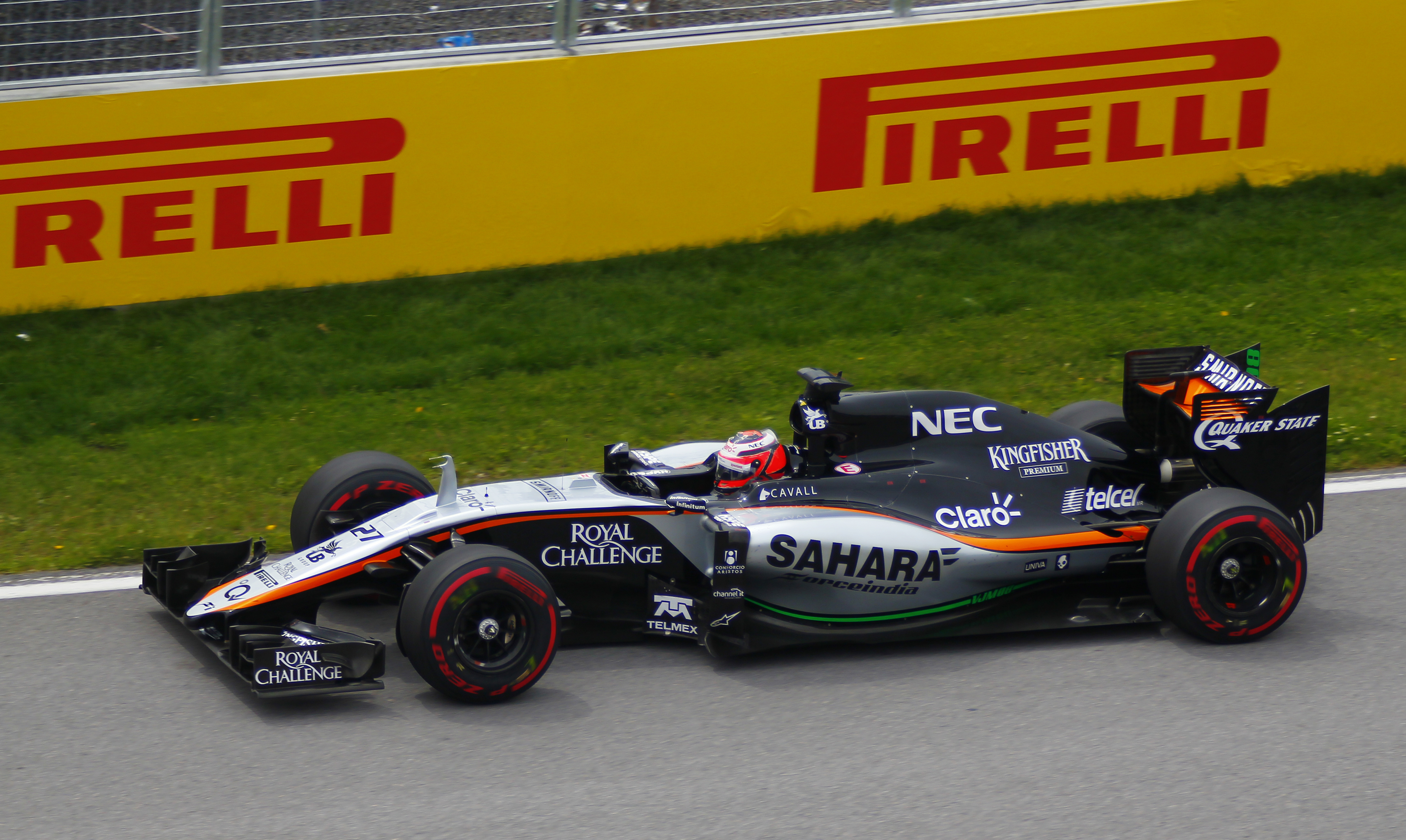
Hülkenberg at the 2015 Canadian Grand Prix.

In the opening round in Australia, Hülkenberg finished seventh, a lap down. However, he would not score again, in an uncompetitive Force India, until Canada. In Hungary, mid-race, he suffered a big crash at turn one when his front wing detached and he drove over it, sending him slightly airborne and into the barriers, costing him a potential fourth place. He then failed to finish five of the next seven races. In Belgium, he had a power unit failure on the way to the grid, while in Singapore, he was tagged by Felipe Massa at turn three and spun into the barriers, and received a three place grid penalty after being deemed responsible. In Russia he spun at turn two at the start and collected Marcus Ericsson, potentially costing him a podium finish, and in the United States he slid into Daniel Ricciardo and broke his front right suspension.

Hülkenberg finished the season 10th with 58 points, 20 points behind his teammate, and helped Force India to secure fifth place in the Constructors' Championship and his best result of the season was sixth, which he achieved three times.

==== 2016 ====
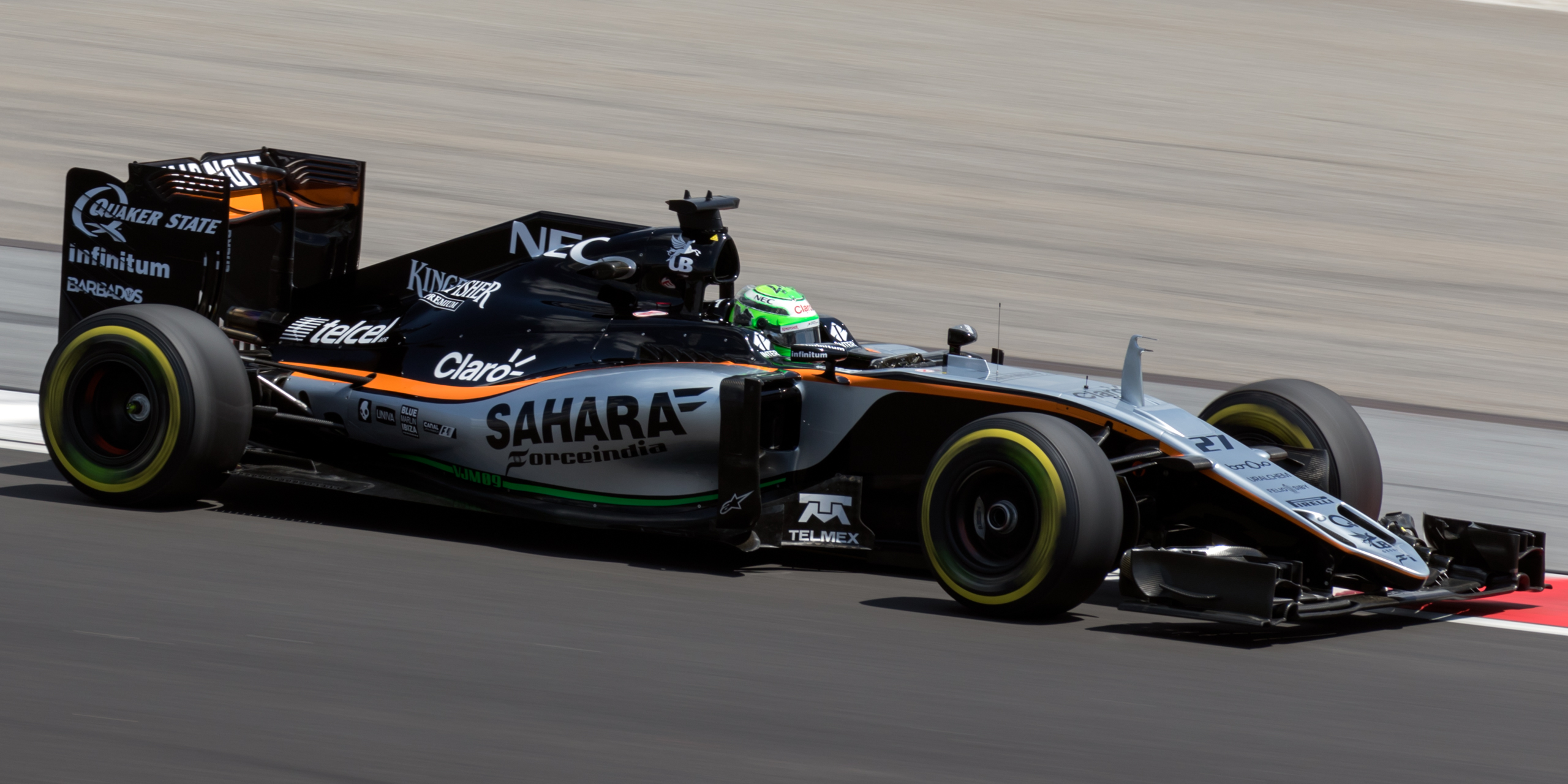
Hülkenberg at the 2016 Malaysian Grand Prix.

Hülkenberg again raced for Force India in 2016 alongside Sergio Pérez.

In the opening round in Australia, Hülkenberg finished seventh. He would finish the next two races in 15th position with the Force India being uncompetitive. In Russia, he was hit by his former teammate Esteban Gutiérrez and retired from the race. He would also retire from the next race with an oil leak. A podium, once again, escaped Hülkenberg's grasp in Monaco. He qualified fifth and was set to finish on the podium, when he was stuck in traffic following his pit stop and his teammate jumped him for the final podium place. He eventually finished sixth, passing the eventual World Champion Nico Rosberg, who had struggled throughout the race, just before the finish line on the last lap. This was followed by points finishes at the next two races. He spun in qualifying during the 2016 European Grand Prix held at Baku, when the Force India was very competitive. This caused him to qualify 13th and finish 9th while Pérez qualified 2nd (demoted to seventh after a grid penalty) and finished third. At the following race in Austria, he put in another strong qualifying performance to qualify third, which became second when Nico Rosberg served his five-place grid penalty. However, he had a poor start, and was overtaken by quicker cars as the race went on, until his brakes failed and he had to retire. This was followed by five consecutive points finishes, including fourth at the 2016 Belgian Grand Prix, his best result of the season, when he was initially running second after the first lap but was eventually passed by the faster cars of Daniel Ricciardo and Lewis Hamilton. At the following race in Singapore, he was involved in a first lap collision, where he was squeezed between two drivers, and had to retire from the race. Hülkenberg finished eighth at the next two races. Having announced his decision to move to Renault for the 2017 season before the 2016 United States Grand Prix, Hülkenberg put on some rejuvenated performances. He qualified seventh in the US, before retiring after being squeezed in between Valtteri Bottas and Sebastian Vettel. He then qualified fifth in Mexico, ahead of the Ferraris and finished seventh. He outqualified his teammate again in Brazil and was running fourth, but he picked up a puncture from debris on the track, following Kimi Räikkönen's crash, costing him a podium finish, and fell outside the points before recovering to seventh, fending off Daniel Ricciardo towards the end of the race. He capped off his season in Abu Dhabi by outqualifying Pérez again to seventh place and finishing in the same position, having survived a collision with Max Verstappen on the first lap.

Hülkenberg scored 72 points in the season, finishing ninth in the Drivers' Championship and helping Force India finish the Constructors' Championship in fourth.

=== Renault (2017–2019) ===
==== 2017 ====
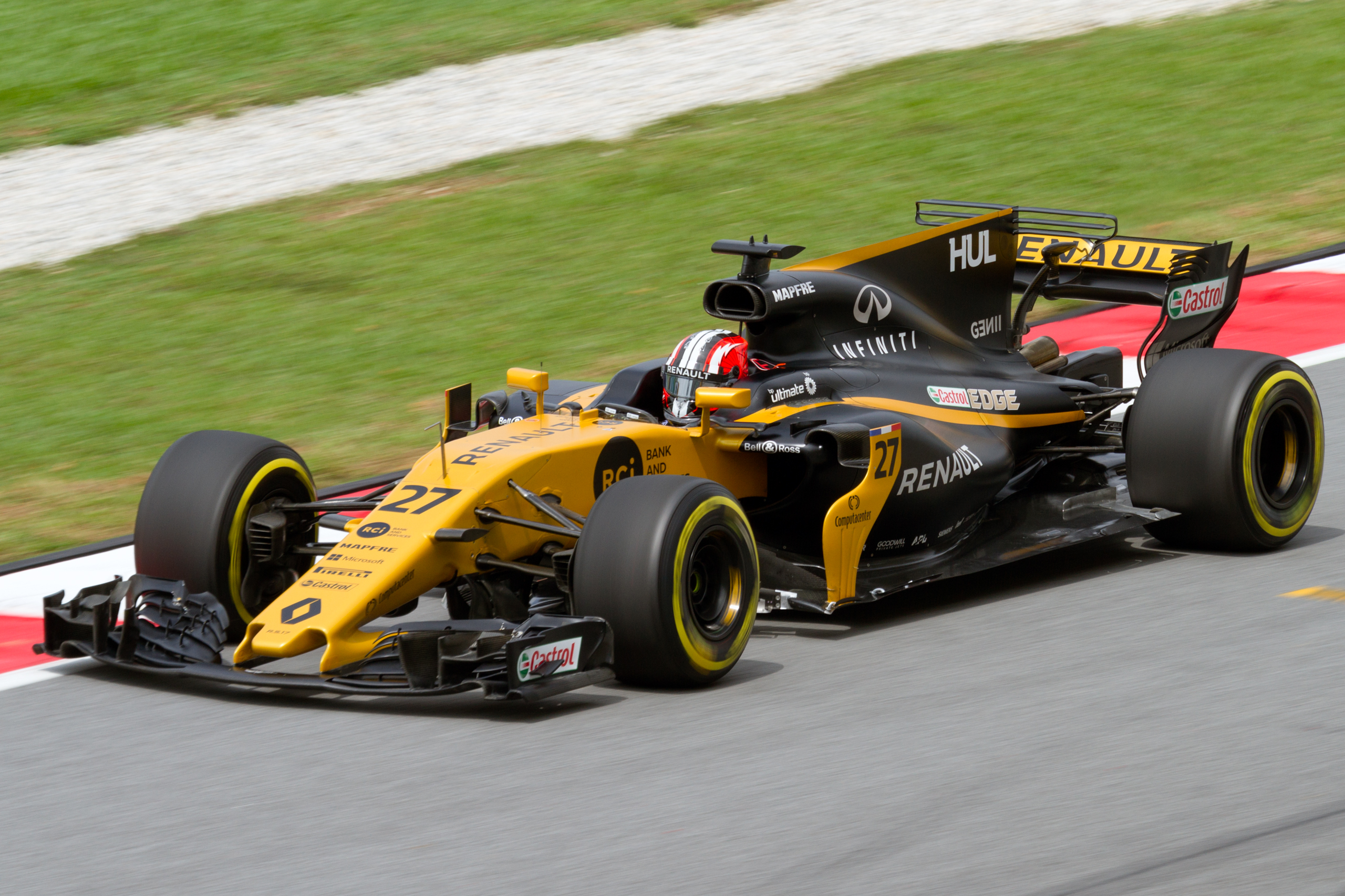
Hülkenberg driving for Renault at the 2017 Malaysian Grand Prix.

On 14 October 2016, Renault Sport announced that Hülkenberg had signed a multiyear agreement to race with the Renault Sport Formula One team.

Hülkenberg got his first points for the team at the third race of the season in Bahrain with 9th place, followed by 8th in Russia. Hülkenberg then finished in 6th place in Spain, Renault's best result in the sport since returning in 2016. His point scoring streak ended in Monaco when he retired, when running in the points, with gearbox issues. He finished 8th in Canada, which was followed by a retirement in Azerbaijan, when he clumsily clipped the wall while running in a promising 6th place. In Austria, he finished 13th, finishing behind his teammate Jolyon Palmer for the first time, following a bad start.

A new Renault upgrade brought massive improvement at the 2017 British Grand Prix as Hülkenberg qualified and finished 6th. The car also proved to be the 'best of the rest' (behind Mercedes, Ferrari and Red Bull) in Hungary as he qualified 7th, but a 5 place grid penalty for a new gearbox meant that he started 12th on the grid. He was set to score points in the race, before a slow pit stop dropped him down the field and he eventually retired from the race. There was an incident during the race, when Kevin Magnussen had pushed Hülkenberg off the track as they were battling for position. Magnussen received a time penalty for the incident. Hülkenberg rudely confronted Magnussen while he was interviewed by Danish TV in the media pen, labelling him 'nasty' and the 'most unsporting driver of the whole grid' and Magnussen calmly responded with 'suck my balls, mate'. Hülkenberg entered the summer break with 26 points and in 10th place in the championship.

Hülkenberg returned from the summer break in Belgium in good form as he qualified 7th and finished 6th in the race. At Singapore, it was announced that Carlos Sainz Jr. would replace Jolyon Palmer, who at that time had scored 0 points to Hülkenberg's 34 points, for the 2018 season. Hülkenberg qualified 'best of the rest' in 7th. After the first lap of the race, Hülkenberg found himself in 3rd place, following the first corner collision and subsequent retirements of Sebastian Vettel, Kimi Räikkönen, Max Verstappen and the fast-starting McLaren of Fernando Alonso. He looked set to take his long-awaited first podium finish in Formula 1, until Daniil Kvyat crashed and brought out the Safety Car and a blunder in strategy by Renault left him in 5th place. He eventually got up to 4th place, before an oil leak brought about his retirement from the race, in which he succeeded Adrian Sutil to become the record holder for the most starts in Formula 1 without a podium finish.

At the Japanese Grand Prix, it was announced that Carlos Sainz Jr. would replace Palmer for the rest of the season beginning at the next Grand Prix in Austin. In the race, Hülkenberg was running comfortably in the points for the majority of the race until a failure in the DRS mechanism of his car forced him to retire from the race. In their time together as teammates Hülkenberg scored 34 points to Palmer's 8 points and outqualified Palmer in all 16 races. In the USA, Hülkenberg retired on lap 4 with an engine issue. In Mexico, he once again retired, again from a net 4th place, with an engine issue. This was the third time in a row that he had failed to finish a race and the fourth time in five races. At the Brazilian Grand Prix, he led home teammate Sainz to 10th place, his first points in almost 3 months, with his previous points finish being his 6th-place finish at Belgium in August. He qualified 'best of the rest' in Abu Dhabi with 7th place. He finished the race in 6th place, having received a contentious 5-second penalty for passing Sergio Pérez off the track at the start of the race, when many believed he should have given the position back. He ended up building enough of a gap to Pérez that the time penalty did not affect his position. With 6th place, Renault overtook Toro Rosso in the Constructors' Championship for 6th place.

This confirmed Renault's position as 6th in the Constructors' Championship and moved Hülkenberg up to 43 points for the season, the same as Massa, but courtesy of more 6th-place finishes, he ended the season 10th in the standings. He had outqualified his teammates over the course of the season 19-1 and outscored his teammates 43–14 over the course of the season.

==== 2018 ====
For the 2018 season, Hülkenberg remained at Renault, alongside Carlos Sainz, who was competing in his first full season for the Renault F1 team.

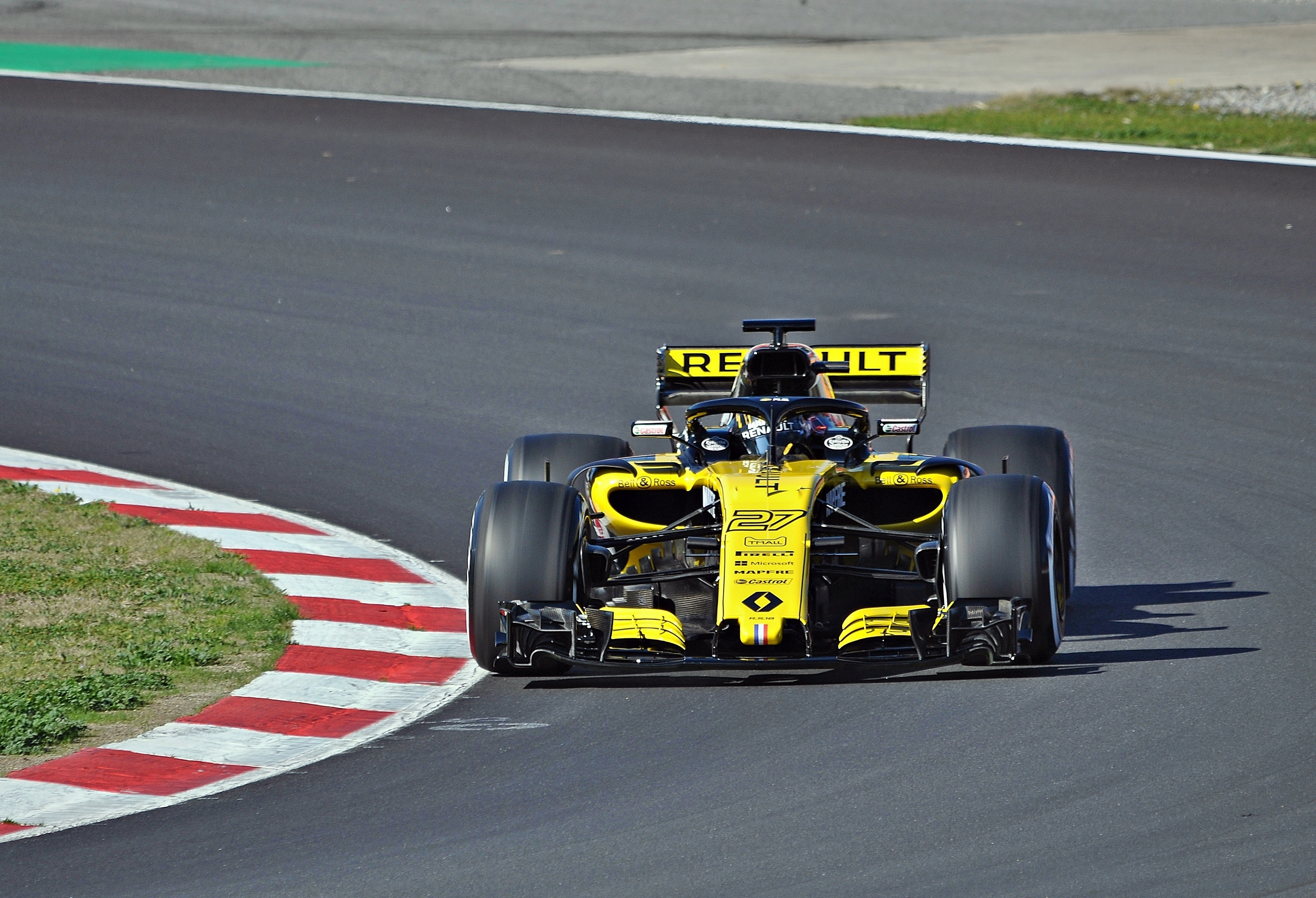
Hülkenberg in the pre-season testing, Barcelona

Hülkenberg and Renault started the season well with a 7th and two 6th places in the first 3 races. The first race in Australia with Sainz finishing in 10th, marked the first double points finish for Renault in F1 since the 2011 Turkish Grand Prix. At the fourth race of the season in Baku, Hülkenberg was handed a 5 place grid penalty for changing his damaged gearbox. He qualified 9th and would start 14th. This meant the end of his streak of starting the last 6 races 7th on the grid. He had made his way up to 5th place by lap 10, when he lost the rear of his car on lap 10, and clattered the wall with his left rear tyre and retired with suspension damage, ending his 5 race point-scoring streak. It was second time in two years that he had retired from a top 6 position in Baku from an unforced error.

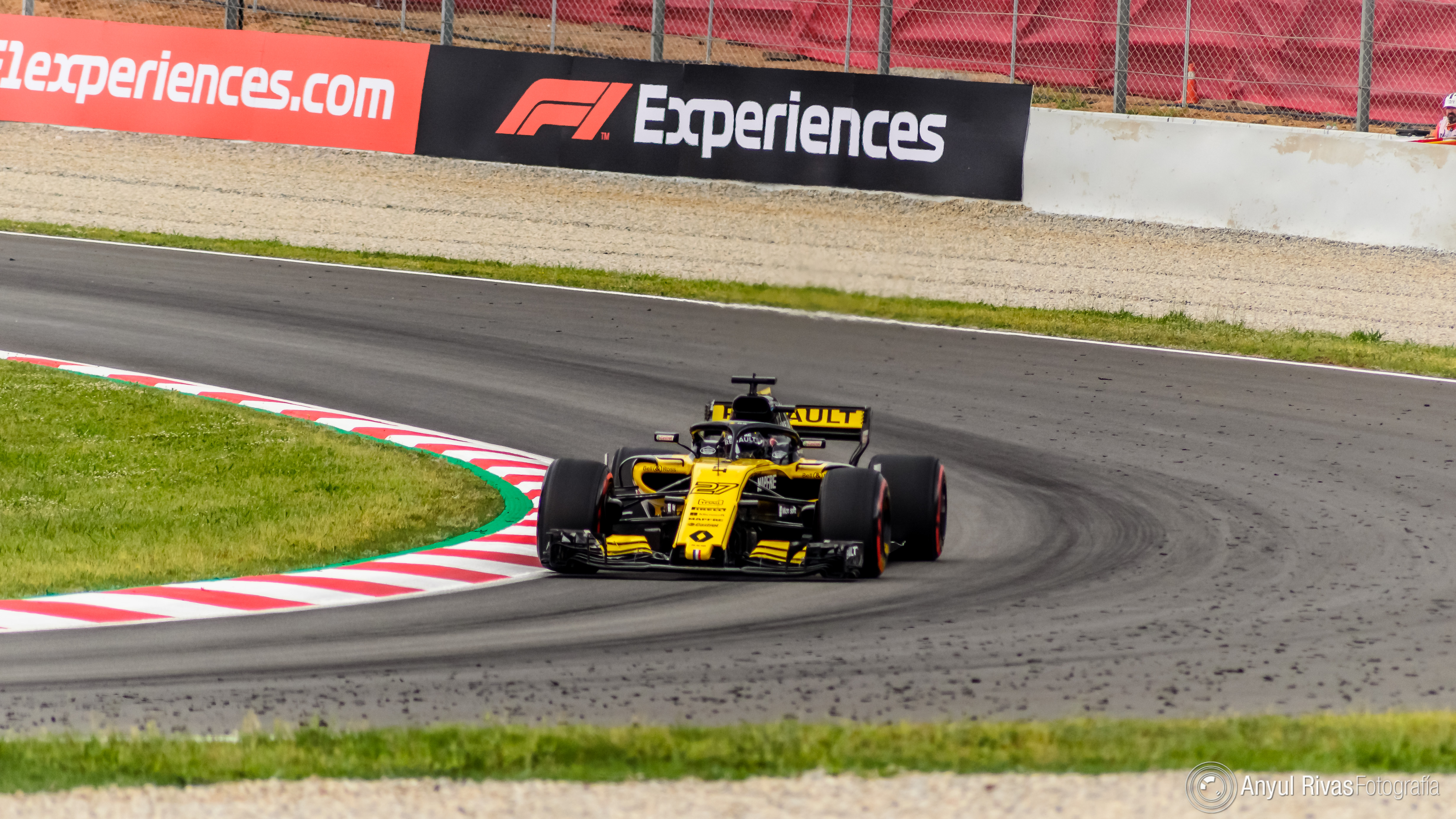
Hülkenberg at the 2018 Spanish Grand Prix.

Hülkenberg's misfortune continued at the next race in Spain. He went out in Q1 for the first time in 59 races due to a fuel pressure problem with his car. Then he was taken out by the spinning Romain Grosjean on the first lap of the race. Hülkenberg criticised Grosjean's driving following the crash, for which the Frenchman received a grid penalty for the next race. In Monaco, Hülkenberg was outqualified by a teammate by merit for the first time since the 2016 Japanese Grand Prix. Nevertheless, he finished the race in 8th, having started in 11th, with his teammate Sainz obeying team orders late in the race to let him past. He followed this up with another point-scoring finish in Canada after qualifying and finishing the race in 7th. The next three races made up Formula One's first ever triple header in France, Austria and Britain. Hülkenberg finished 9th in France, followed by a retirement from 9th in Austria with an engine failure. It was his 3rd retirement in 6 races and his 7th retirement in his last 16 races. However, he finished the triple header on a high, finishing 6th at the British Grand Prix. Hülkenberg achieved his best ever result for Renault at his home grand prix in Germany with 5th place, overtaking Kevin Magnussen late on when the rain started to fall. After a refuelling problem limited him to only 13th on the grid, he finished 12th at the Hungarian Grand Prix. Nevertheless, he entered the summer break with 52 points and 7th in the championship as the effective leader of the midfield, which many drivers had started to dub the B championship of Formula 1 or 'Formula 1.5', due to very large gap in performance to the top three teams of Mercedes, Ferrari and Red Bull.

In Belgium, Hülkenberg triggered a massive first corner collision after starting 18th due to engine penalties. Hülkenberg outbraked himself and hit Fernando Alonso, who was launched above the Sauber of Charles Leclerc, with one of Alonso's tyres hitting the new controversially introduced safety device, the halo. The collision also ultimately ended the races of both Kimi Räikkönen and Daniel Ricciardo. Hülkenberg was deemed to have 'completely misjudged the situation' by the race stewards and handed a 10 place grid penalty for the next race. The spectacular crash was likened to the crash at the 2012 Belgian Grand Prix initiated by Romain Grosjean. Following the incident, Hülkenberg who had been a vocal opposer to the halo, introduced in 2018, admitted that it was 'pretty useful'.

Hülkenberg suffered a tough period of results, coinciding with Renault's loss of competitiveness, by only scoring 1 point in the next 4 races. He bounced back with a 6th-place finish at the United States Grand Prix. With Sainz finishing in 7th, this was the best team result for Renault in a race since they rejoined the sport in 2016, beating the 7th and 8th place the two drivers had achieved in Canada earlier in the year. This was followed by another strong race in Mexico with another 6th place. His season ended with two successive retirements due to high engine temperatures in Brazil and after being rolled over into the barriers by Romain Grosjean in Abu Dhabi.

Nevertheless, Hülkenberg finished the season as the "champion of the rest" in 7th place with 69 points, 7 points ahead of Sergio Pérez, as Renault also secured 4th place in the Constructor's Championship.

==== 2019 ====
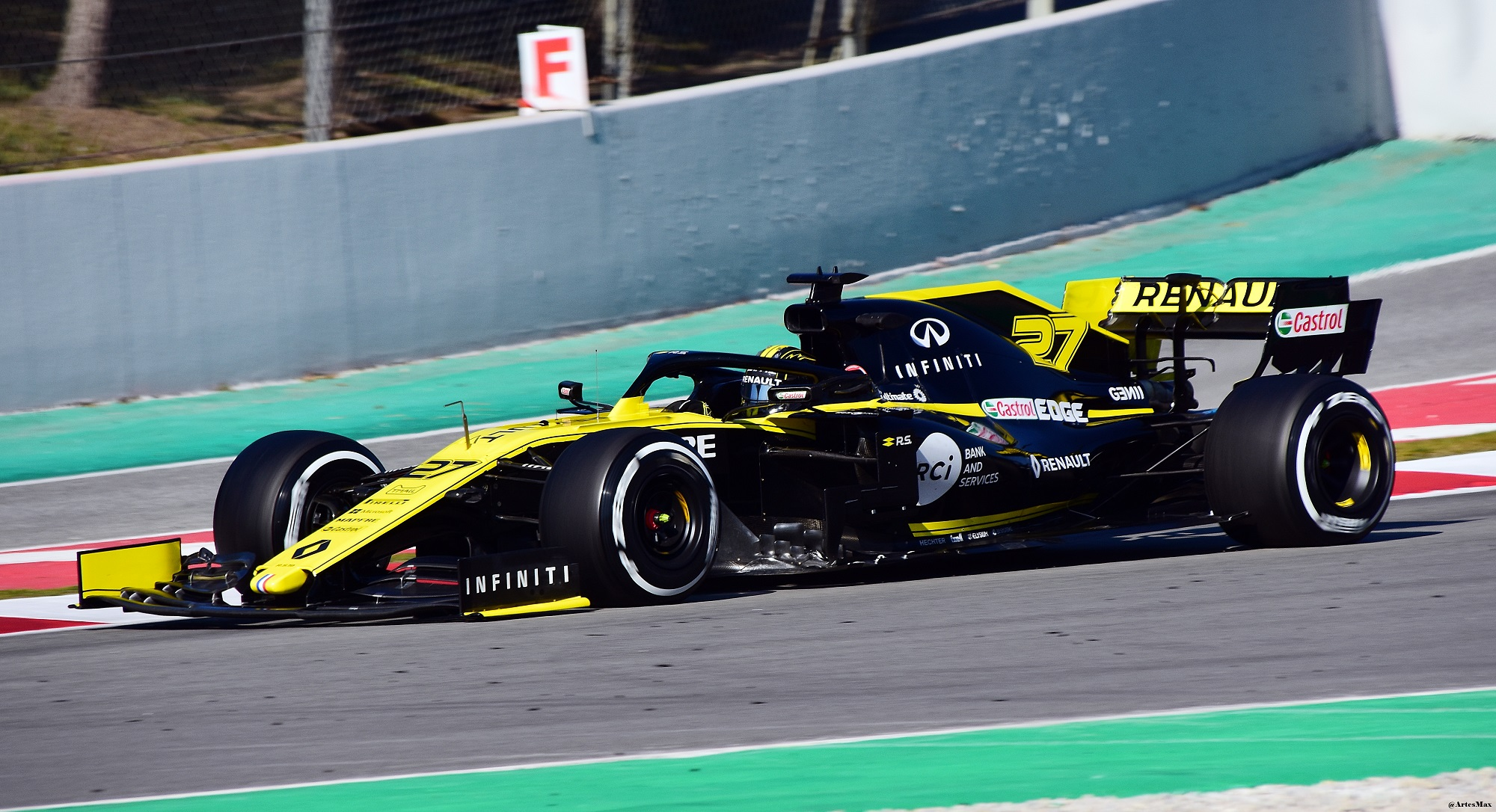
Hülkenberg driving during 2019 pre-season testing

For the 2019 season, Hülkenberg was joined at Renault by multiple Grand Prix winner Daniel Ricciardo, who was signed from Red Bull. Hülkenberg, yet to score a podium in 158 races by the beginning of the 2019 season, said his "future in the sport depends on the outcome of the duel" as his ability could be measured "against a Grand Prix winner", for the first time since his rookie season in 2010, when he was teammate to Rubens Barrichello at Williams. Meanwhile, Renault managing director, Cyril Abiteboul, believed that the driver pairing was "one of the strongest - if not the strongest - driver line-up on the grid".

Hülkenberg started the season strongly, outqualifying new teammate Ricciardo at his home race, but an engine issue prevented him from reaching Q3, leaving him 11th. He made a very strong start and finished the race in 7th. However, he was hit by misfortune in the next race in Bahrain. An engine mapping issue restricted him to 17th in qualifying. However, he had a fantastic race, moving up 11 places and being on course to finish 6th, surviving contact with Ricciardo on the way, when the Australian slid into him as Hülkenberg overtook him. Then, on lap 53, 4 laps from the end, disaster struck as both Hülkenberg and Ricciardo, running 6th and 10th respectively, both retired with engine issues at the same corner. Abiteboul stated that Renault's engine problems were "unacceptable". These issues were compounded, when Hülkenberg again retired from a points-scoring position with engine issues at the next race in China, this time with a software issue. In Spain, Hülkenberg crashed in qualifying and damaged his front wing. He had to fit a different specification front wing, which broke parc fermé rules, ensuring he would have to start the race in the pit lane. He would finish the race in 13th. In the following race in Monaco, a chance of a points finish evaporated, when the Ferrari of Charles Leclerc hit Hülkenberg, while attempting an overtaking move, which the German labelled "too ambitious". Both drivers suffered punctures. Hülkenberg recovered to 13th, but Leclerc eventually retired from the race. He then finished the next two races in 7th and 8th place in Canada and France respectively. At the British Grand Prix, he recovered to a 10th-place finish, after he was hit by former teammate Sergio Pérez and his engine momentarily failing and going into 'limp mode', whilst also bemoaning the team's strategy. Hülkenberg then crashed out of his home race in precarious wet conditions. He was in 4th place, having run as high as 2nd at one point, when he crashed out at Turn 16, where fellow drivers Charles Leclerc, race leader Lewis Hamilton and former teammate Carlos Sainz also went off. The latter two managed to survive their incidents and continue, while both Leclerc and Hülkenberg retired. Both retirees criticised the run-off of the corner, which is a different tarmac used for dragster racing, which meant there was no grip in the wet conditions to help prevent the accident. At the following race in Hungary, Hülkenberg was in the running for points, but then he suffered yet another engine problem on his Renault, which meant he was only able to finish in 12th place. Going into the summer break, Hülkenberg was only 14th in the championship with 17 points, 5 points behind new teammate Daniel Ricciardo in 11th place. Renault's points total of 39 points was 43 points behind the position they were in the previous year, after they suffered a disappointing first half of the season.

Just before the Belgian Grand Prix, Renault announced that Hülkenberg would be replaced by Mercedes reserve driver and former Force India driver Esteban Ocon for the 2020 season. Hülkenberg said the decision was "not only about performance", alluding that the French Renault team desired a French driver in Ocon. Four-time World Champion Alain Prost, non-executive director for Renault Sport at the time, said that Renault offered Hülkenberg a new one-year contract with an option for another year, but the German refused the offer due to wanting a full two-year contract.

Hülkenberg started the second half of the season strongly by qualifying 7th in Belgium. A grid penalty meant he started 12th, and he fell even further back when he took evasive action to avoid collisions involving Verstappen, Räikkönen, Ricciardo and Stroll. However, he executed an alternate two-stop strategy and made up 3 places in the last lap to finish 8th. In Italy, both Renaults had a very strong weekend, with Ricciardo and Hülkenberg qualifying 5th and 6th respectively, with both drivers moving up a place to finish 4th and 5th, after Sebastian Vettel spun out of contention. This was Renault's best points haul since returning to the sport in 2016, and Hülkenberg's joint best result for the team.

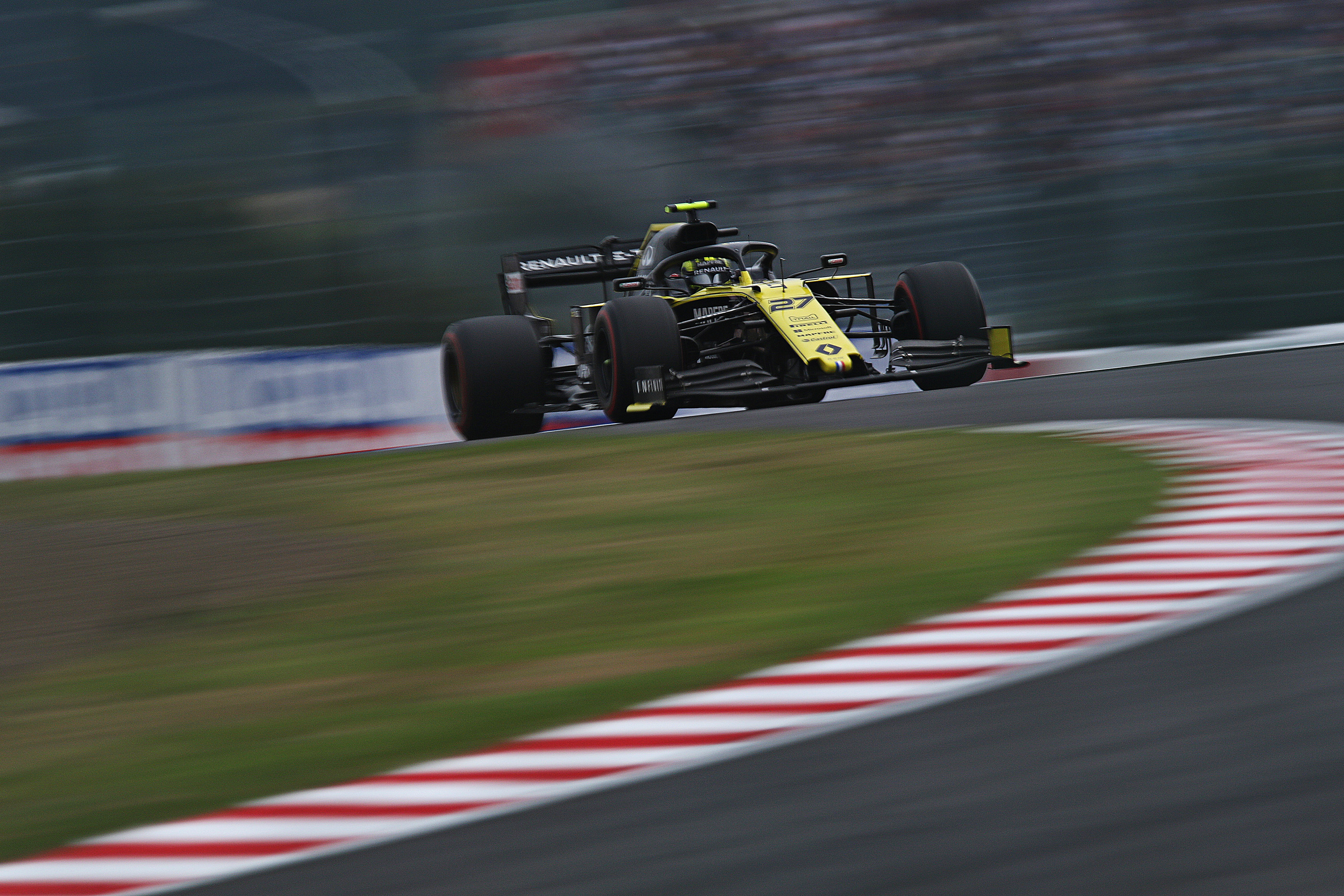
Hülkenberg at the 2019 Japanese Grand Prix.

In Singapore, Hülkenberg had initially qualified 9th but as teammate Daniel Ricciardo had been disqualified from qualifying as his car exceeded the MGU-K power limit, he started the race in 8th. In the race, Hülkenberg was involved in a first lap collision with former teammate Carlos Sainz Jr. Both drivers suffered punctures and had to pit on the first lap and fell to the back of the field. However, he managed to recover to 9th place for his 3rd points finish in a row. Hülkenberg started the next race in an impressive 6th place. However, his race was compromised by a bad start which left him outside the top 10. Having recovered to 9th place, the Renault pit crew dropped his car off the jack, which again dropped him out of the top 10. He eventually recovered to finish in 10th, overtaking Lance Stroll towards the end of the race. After the race, Hülkenberg said that "everything that could go wrong did go wrong". Further misfortune hit Hülkenberg in Japan. He was restricted to only 15th in qualifying, after a mechanical failure in Q2 meant he could not set a representative time to progress further. However, in the race he made a fantastic start and was up to 10th place by the end of the first lap and he would end up finishing the race in that position. However, following a protest by rival constructor Racing Point, both Renault cars were disqualified for having a pre-set automated brake bias system that was deemed to be a driver aid, and thus illegal. This was Hülkenberg's first disqualification in his entire F1 career.

Hülkenberg then managed to salvage a point at the following race with 10th after he was spun into the wall by Daniil Kvyat at the last corner of the last lap, when running in 9th. He crossed the line in 11th, without a rear wing, but was promoted to 10th after Kvyat was penalised for the incident. He followed this up with yet another points finish in the USA with 9th place. He suffered a difficult race in Brazil, where two safety car periods interfered in his strategy and left him 12th on the line. He was penalised for overtaking Kevin Magnussen before the safety car line during the safety car restart, and thus was classified 15th, his worst result of the year. He was voted Driver of the Day in the season finale in Abu Dhabi, taking the title for the first time, after finishing 12th in what was his possible final race in Formula One, having failed to secure a drive for the 2020 season.

Hülkenberg finished the season in 14th place, his lowest placing in the standings in the sport since his debut season in 2010, having scored 37 points across the season, 17 less than teammate Daniel Ricciardo.

=== Racing Point / Aston Martin reserve driver (2020–2022) ===
Hülkenberg did not have a contract for the 2020 F1 season. He replaced Sergio Pérez at Racing Point for the British Grand Prix and 70th Anniversary Grand Prix after Pérez tested positive for SARS-2 coronavirus. For the British Grand Prix he qualified thirteenth but did not start the race due to an engine failure before the start of the race. At the 70th Anniversary Grand Prix, he surprisingly qualified in third behind the two Mercedes cars and was running in 4th in the race. However, due to unexpectedly high levels of tyre wear, he was forced to pit again. He then went on to finish seventh behind teammate Lance Stroll. Hülkenberg did not race at the Spanish Grand Prix as Pérez returned to racing after testing negative for COVID-19. He would later replace Stroll for the Eifel Grand Prix, after the Canadian had sat out of the final practice session due to him feeling unwell before later testing positive for COVID-19 himself. Hülkenberg finished the race in 8th after qualifying 20th, and last, on the grid, winning him the fans' vote of "Driver of the Day".

Racing Point, now Aston Martin Cognizant Formula One Team, signed Hülkenberg as a reserve and development driver for the 2021 season following his stand-in performances in the prior season.

After retaining his role as the team's reserve driver in 2022, Hülkenberg replaced Sebastian Vettel at the season opening Bahrain Grand Prix after Vettel tested positive for COVID-19. Hülkenberg started and finished the race in 17th place. Hülkenberg returned to Aston Martin in the following race, the Saudi Arabian Grand Prix starting in 17th and finishing in 12th place.

Hülkenberg got back into the Aston Martin in the post-Hungarian Grand Prix Pirelli tests, alongside Lance Stroll to develop the 2023 tyres.

=== Haas (2023–2024) ===
==== 2023 ====
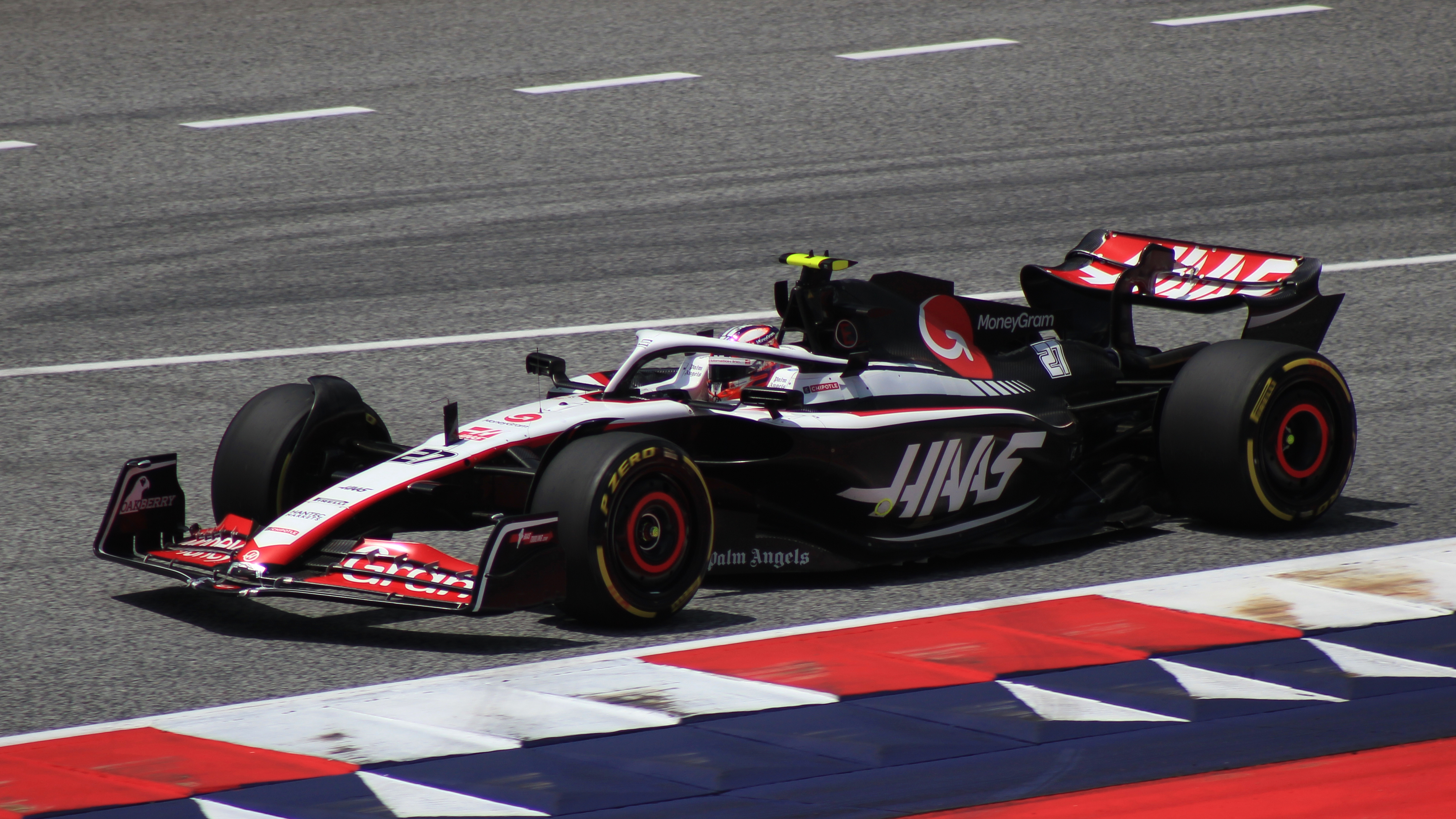
Hülkenberg at the 2023 Austrian Grand Prix

In November 2022, Haas F1 Team announced that Hülkenberg had signed to drive for them in 2023, partnering Kevin Magnussen and replacing fellow German compatriot Mick Schumacher. The first race at the Bahrain Grand Prix saw Hülkenberg qualify tenth and finish fifteenth, behind his teammate Magnussen. He had also picked up a fifteen-second penalty for exceeding track limits, which ultimately did not affect his final position in the race. In the 2023 Australian Grand Prix, Hülkenberg benefitted from the turn one incident in lap 57, running in fourth when the third of three red flags during the race was shown; however, he was demoted back to seventh after it was determined that the drivers would return to their previous positions before the final red flag. Haas lodged an unsuccessful protest after the race. At the Canadian Grand Prix, Hülkenberg qualified in second in a wet qualifying session in which he benefited when McLaren's Oscar Piastri crashed at the early part of the qualifying session which brought out the red flag. The rest of the grid were not able to improve on their qualifying as the rain got heavier when the session restarted. However, Hülkenberg was handed a three-place grid penalty for a red flag infraction and started the race in fifth position. In the race, excessive tyre wear and the unfortunate timing of a safety car meant he eventually finished 15th. At the Austrian Grand Prix, Hülkenberg qualified an impressive 4th for the Sprint in wet conditions. The Sprint, also run in wet conditions, saw him take 2nd place on the first lap, but he eventually finished 6th, securing 3 crucial points for the struggling Haas team, to take them into 7th in the Constructor's standings. For the main grand prix, Hülkenberg qualified an impressive 8th, but had to retire early in the race with an engine issue. By the summer break, Hülkenberg had qualified in the top 10 an impressive 6 times, compared to his teammate's singular appearance. However, the Haas team's season-long struggle with tyre wear meant that neither he nor Haas had managed to add to their points tally since Austria as Haas slipped to 8th in the championship.

Hülkenberg finished 16th in the championship with 9 points to teammate Magnussen's 3. Despite the low points tally he was praised for his qualifying performances, during the season he qualified in the top ten 11 times (3 times in sprint qualifying and 8 times in normal qualifying) even though he had been out of a full time seat for three seasons.

==== 2024 ====
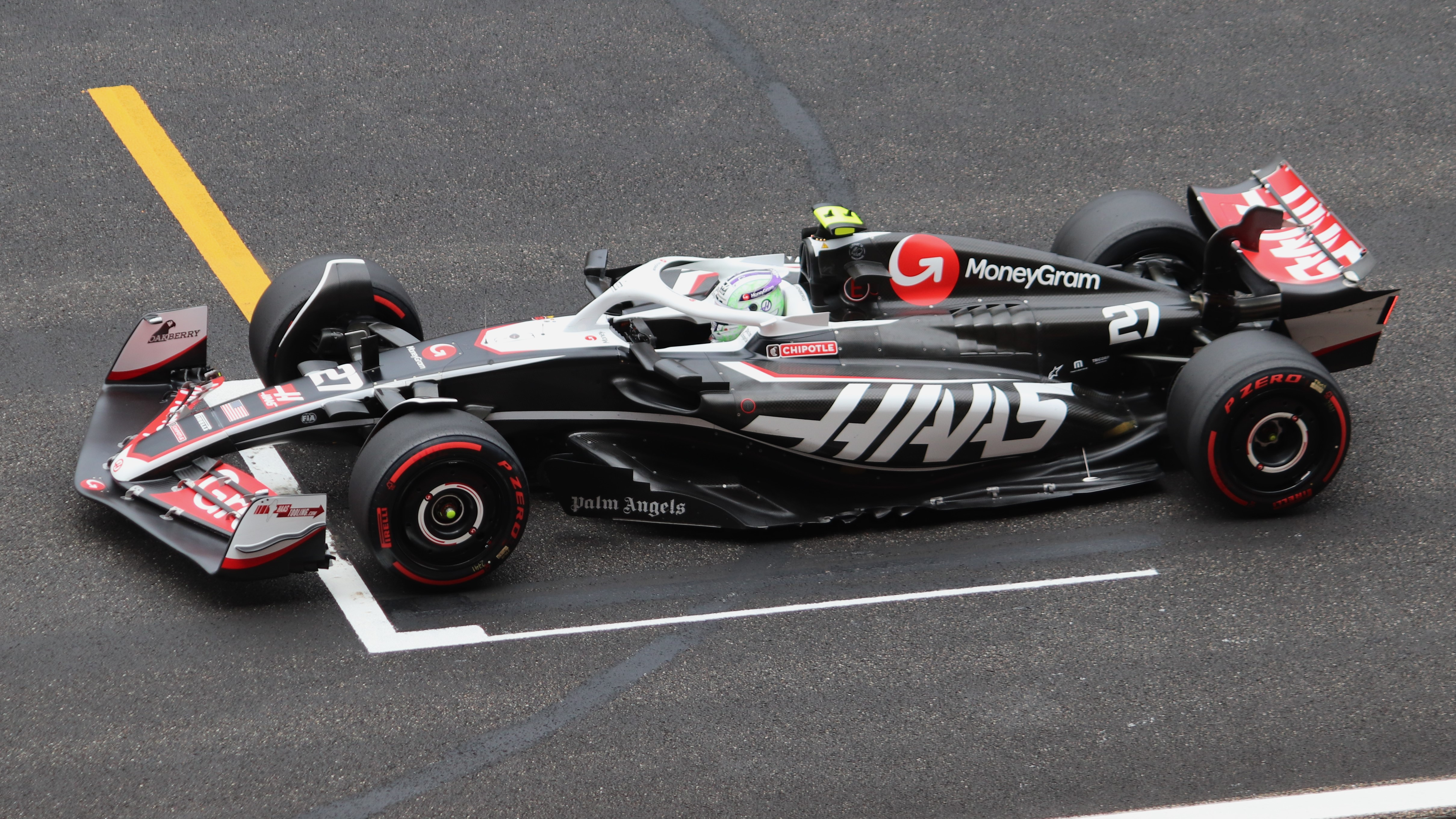
Hülkenberg at the 2024 Chinese Grand Prix

In August 2023, Haas announced that Hülkenberg and Magnussen had been retained for the 2024 season. He earned his first point of the season by finishing 10th at the 2024 Saudi Arabian Grand Prix with the help of strong defending from his teammate. He continued his good run of form by scoring points in Australia and China as well. He finished 6th at the Austrian Grand Prix after holding off the Red Bull of Sergio Perez at the end of the race. Magnussen finished 8th, marking Haas's best result of the season and moving the team up to 7th place in the standings. He repeated this result at the British Grand Prix, qualifying 6th and finishing in that position. He again qualified 6th at the Singapore Grand Prix, finishing 9th after a defensive drive. He finished 8th at the United States Grand Prix, and took 9th at the Mexico City Grand Prix as Magnussen finished 7th. Hülkenberg was disqualified from a rainy São Paulo Grand Prix for receiving assistance from marshals to rejoin the race after being stranded, becoming the first driver to receive a black flag since the 2007 Canadian Grand Prix. After finishing 8th in Las Vegas and failing to finish in Qatar, Hülkenberg qualified 4th at the season-ending Abu Dhabi Grand Prix, in front of the Red Bull of champion Max Verstappen. However, he started 7th after being given a three-place grid penalty for overtaking in the pit-road exit. He finished 8th in the race, but fell to 11th place in the standings after Pierre Gasly finished in 7th.

=== Return to Sauber / Audi (2025–present) ===
==== 2025: Maiden podium with Sauber ====
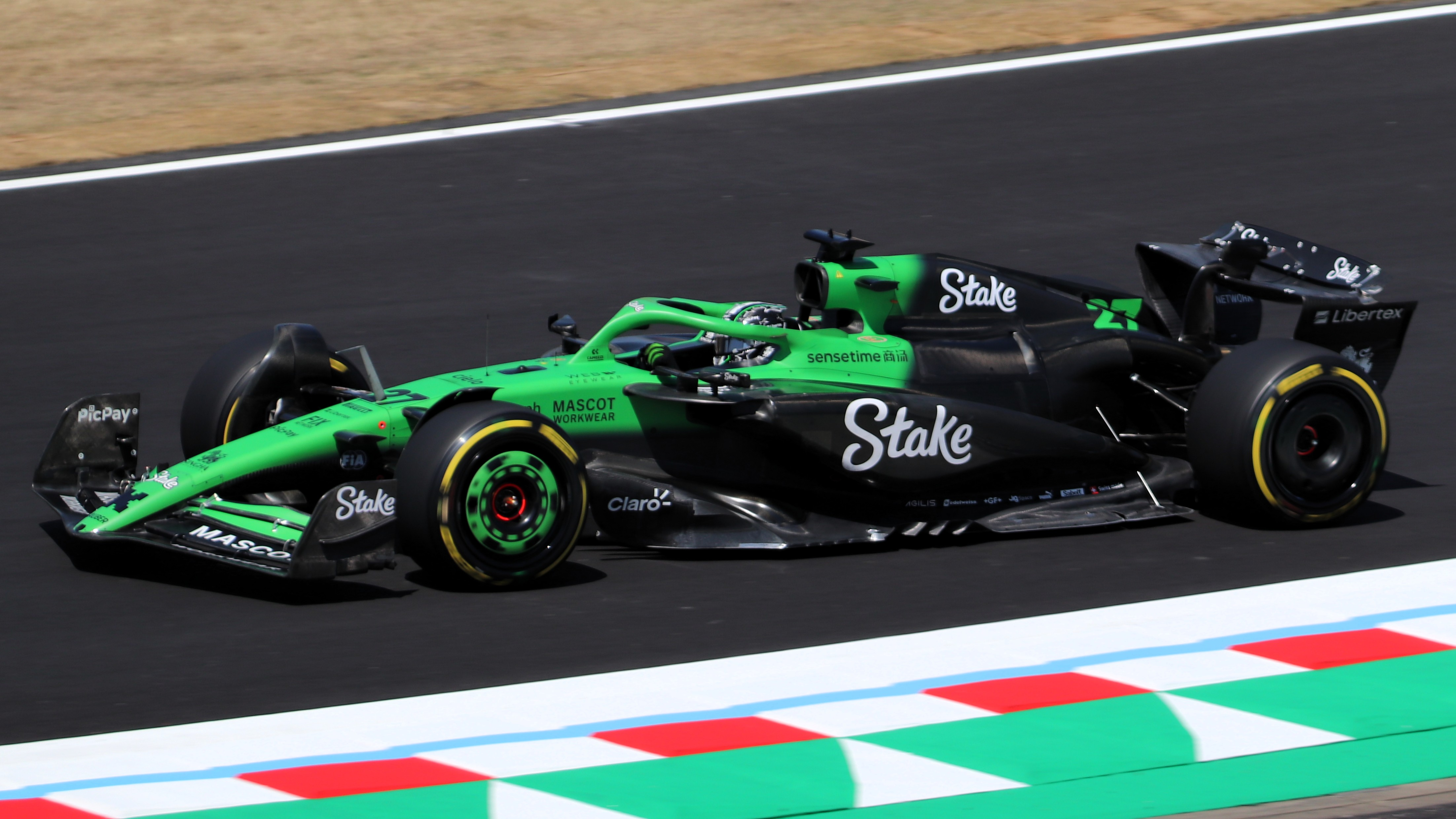
Hülkenberg (pictured at the Japanese Grand Prix) returned to Sauber in 2025, ahead of their acquisition by Audi.

Hülkenberg left Haas for his 2025 campaign, with Sauber signing him in preparation for Audi's takeover of the team from 2026 and beyond. He is partnered by reigning FIA Formula 2 champion Gabriel Bortoleto; the two replaced Valtteri Bottas and Zhou Guanyu. In a wet season-opening Australian Grand Prix, Hülkenberg finished seventh to claim six points—more than Sauber had achieved in the entirety of 2024. After seven Grands Prix without points, (Note: The Chinese, Japanese, Bahrain, Saudi Arabian, Miami, Emilia Romagna, and Monaco Grands Prix.) including a disqualification in Bahrain for excessive skid block wear, upgrades for the Spanish Grand Prix saw Sauber emerge as a midfield challenger, with Hülkenberg qualifying sixteenth and finishing fifth after a late safety car. He then claimed eighth at the Canadian Grand Prix, having started eleventh, and ninth in Austria—behind teammate Bortoleto—after qualifying last on the grid.

At the rain-affected British Grand Prix, Hülkenberg finished third behind race winner Lando Norris and his McLaren teammate Oscar Piastri in 2nd to secure his maiden podium finish in Formula One after starting nineteenth, ending his record 239-race streak without a top-three finish; on a "perfectly-timed" strategy, he held off the late advances of Lewis Hamilton to claim Sauber's first podium in 13 years. His performance was widely acclaimed by drivers and critics, with several remarking that his first podium was "overdue". He dropped outside the points again with twelfth in Belgium and thirteenth in Hungary.

==== 2026: Audi ====
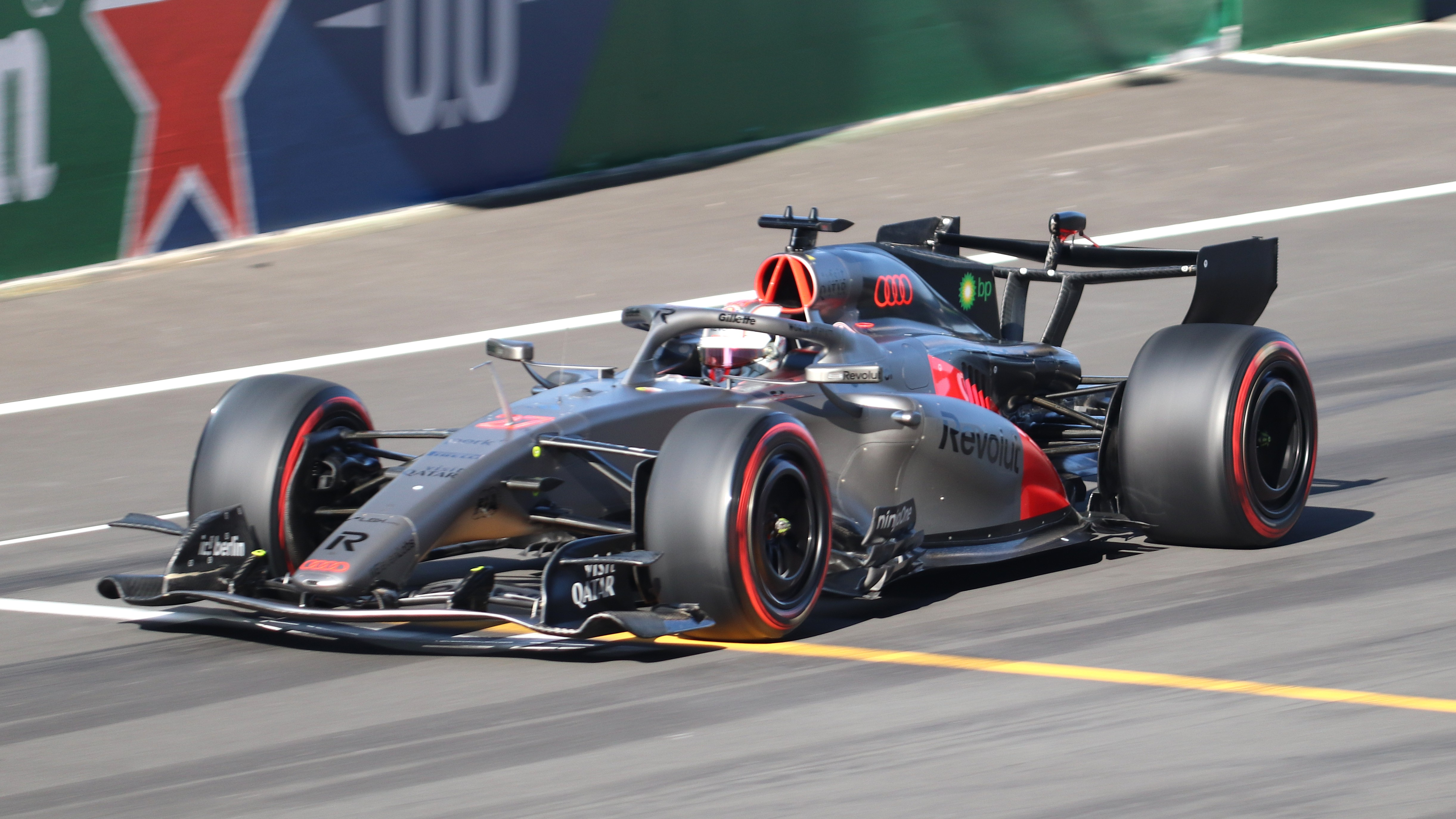
Hülkenberg at the 2026 Chinese Grand Prix driving the Audi R26

Hülkenberg retained his place alongside Bortoleto at the re-branded Audi in 2026.

== Other racing ==
=== Sportscar racing ===
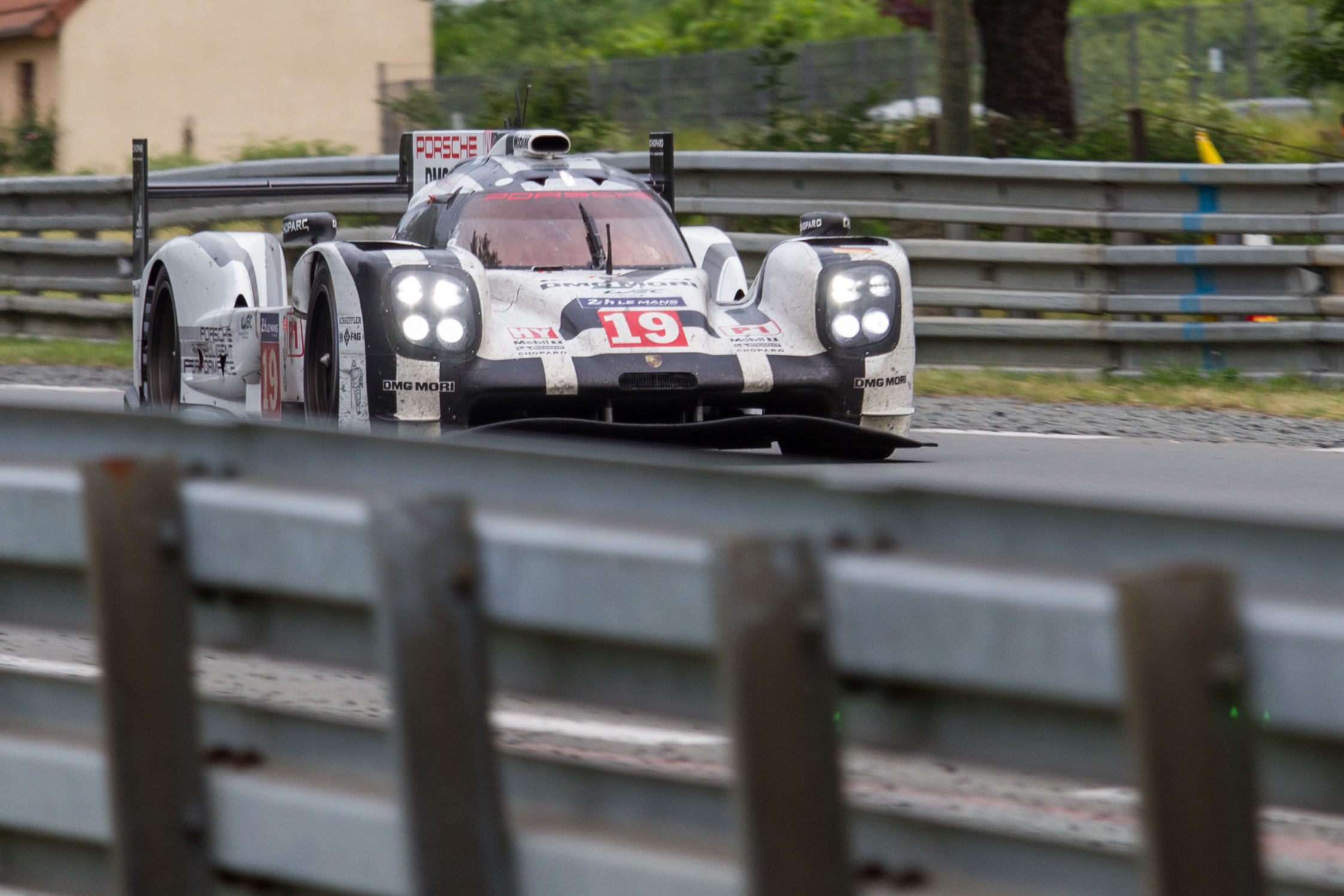
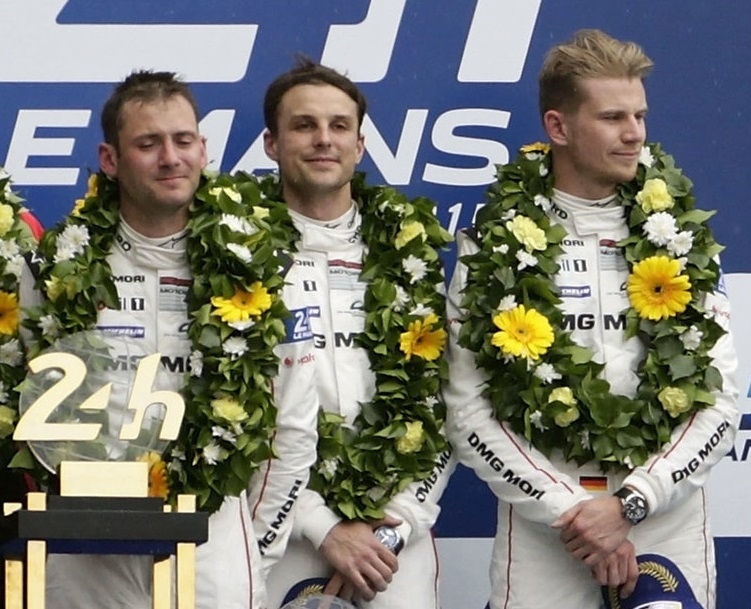
Left photo: Hülkenberg's No. 19 Porsche 919 Hybrid, which won the 2015 24 Hours of Le Mans.
Right photo: Hülkenberg (right) on the podium alongside his teammates Nick Tandy and Earl Bamber

It was confirmed in November 2014 that Hülkenberg would compete in the 2015 24 Hours of Le Mans in a third factory-backed Porsche 919 Hybrid. He also contested the Spa-Francorchamps round of the World Endurance Championship as preparation.

On 14 June 2015, he won the 24 Hours of Le Mans race, driving alongside Britain's Nick Tandy and Earl Bamber of New Zealand. They completed 395 laps, one lap ahead of the car of their Porsche teammates Mark Webber, Brendon Hartley and Timo Bernhard, who took second place. This win was Porsche's first overall victory in the event since the 1998 24 Hours of Le Mans. Hülkenberg's triumph made him the first active Formula One driver to win at Le Mans since Johnny Herbert and Bertrand Gachot, who performed the same feat in 1991.

=== IndyCar ===
On 25 October 2021, Hülkenberg took part in a private IndyCar test at Barber Motorsports Park, driving the No. 7 Arrow McLaren SP (AMSP) car, with AMSP team principal Taylor Kiel stating in a report that Hülkenberg was in consideration for a third part-time entry in 2022. After completing over 100 laps, he set a best time of 77.454 seconds in his first test, roughly a second off of the fastest time, which was set by 2021 Indy Lights runner-up David Malukas. Hülkenberg ultimately declined an opportunity to pursue a career in IndyCar with McLaren, stating that he was unwilling to race on ovals and that he found the Dallara DW12 to be significantly harder to drive physically than the Formula One cars he was used to.

Although refusing to race IndyCars on ovals, Hülkenberg does actually have race experience on a superspeedway. As part of his 2006 German Formula Three Championship campaign for team Josef Kaufmann Racing, he raced in the ADAC East Side 100, an oval race on the Eurospeedway Lausitz.

== Other ventures ==
Hülkenberg has entered his own team in the eSkootr Championship, named "27X by Nico Hülkenberg".

== Karting record ==
=== Karting career summary ===
| Season | Series | Team | Position |
|---|---|---|---|
| 2000 | Andrea Margutti Trophy — 100 Junior | | 17th |
| 2000 | Italian Open Masters — ICA Junior | | 14th |
| 2000 | CIK-FIA Green Helmet Trophy – Cadet | | 11th |
| 2001 | South Garda Winter Cup — ICA Junior | | 5th |
| 2001 | Italian Open Masters — ICA Junior | | 1st |
| 2001 | CIK-FIA Green Helmet Trophy – Cadet | CRG Holland | 2nd |
| 2001 | German Karting Championship — Junior | CRG Holland | 25th |
| 2002 | South Garda Winter Cup — ICA Junior | CRG Holland | 24th |
| 2002 | Italian Open Masters — ICA Junior | CRG Holland | 1st |
| 2002 | CIK-FIA European Championship — ICA Junior | CRG Holland | 8th |
| 2002 | German Karting Championship — Junior | CRG Holland | 1st |
| 2003 | South Garda Winter Cup — Formula A | CRG Holland | 7th |
| 2003 | Andrea Margutti Trophy — Formula A | CRG Holland | 33rd |
| 2003 | Italian Open Masters — Formula A | CRG Holland | 5th |
| 2003 | German Karting Championship — Senior | CRG Holland | 1st |
| 2003 | CIK-FIA European Championship — Formula A | CRG Holland | 41st |
| 2003 | CIK-FIA World Championship — Formula A | CRG Holland | 32nd |
| 2004 | South Garda Winter Cup — Formula A | CRG Holland | 28th |
| 2004 | Italian Open Masters — Formula A | CRG Holland | 8th |
| 2004 | German Karting Championship — Senior | CRG Holland | 2nd |

== Racing record ==
=== Racing career summary ===
| Season | Series | Team | Races | Wins | Poles | F/Laps | Podiums | Points | Position |
|---|---|---|---|---|---|---|---|---|---|
| 2005 | Formula BMW ADAC | Josef Kaufmann Racing | 20 | 8 | 9 | 6 | 14 | 287 | **1st** |
| 2005 | Formula BMW World Final | Josef Kaufmann Racing | 1 | 0 | 0 | 1 | 1 | N/A | **3rd** |
| 2006 | German Formula 3 Championship | Josef Kaufmann Racing | 18 | 1 | 3 | 5 | 6 | 78 | 5th |
| 2006 | V de V Challenge Endurance Moderne | Griffith's | 2 | 1 | 2 | ? | 1 | 50 | 17th |
| 2006–07 | A1 Grand Prix | A1 Team Germany | 20 | 9 | 3 | 5 | 14 | 128 | **1st** |
| 2007 | Formula 3 Euro Series | ASM Formule 3 | 20 | 4 | 2 | 3 | 8 | 72 | **3rd** |
| 2007 | Macau Grand Prix | ASM Formule 3 | 1 | 0 | 0 | 0 | 0 | N/A | 23rd |
| 2007 | Masters of Formula 3 | ASM Formule 3 | 1 | 1 | 0 | 0 | 1 | N/A | **1st** |
| 2007 | Formula One | AT&T Williams | Test/Reserve driver | | | | | | |
| 2008 | Formula 3 Euro Series | ART Grand Prix | 20 | 7 | 6 | 7 | 8 | 87 | **1st** |
| 2008 | Masters of Formula 3 | ART Grand Prix | 1 | 0 | 1 | 0 | 1 | N/A | **2nd** |
| 2008 | Formula One | AT&T Williams | Test/Reserve driver | | | | | | |
| 2008–09 | GP2 Asia Series | ART Grand Prix | 4 | 1 | 2 | 0 | 2 | 27 | 6th |
| 2009 | GP2 Series | ART Grand Prix | 20 | 5 | 3 | 5 | 10 | 100 | **1st** |
| 2009 | Formula One | AT&T Williams | Test/Reserve driver | | | | | | |
| 2010 | Formula One | AT&T Williams | 19 | 0 | 1 | 0 | 0 | 22 | 14th |
| 2011 | Formula One | Force India F1 Team | Test/Reserve driver | | | | | | |
| 2012 | Formula One | Sahara Force India F1 Team | 20 | 0 | 0 | 1 | 0 | 63 | 11th |
| 2013 | Formula One | Sauber F1 Team | 19 | 0 | 0 | 0 | 0 | 51 | 10th |
| 2014 | Formula One | Sahara Force India F1 Team | 19 | 0 | 0 | 0 | 0 | 96 | 9th |
| 2015 | Formula One | Sahara Force India F1 Team | 19 | 0 | 0 | 0 | 0 | 58 | 10th |
| 2015 | FIA World Endurance Championship | Porsche Team | 2 | 1 | 0 | 0 | 1 | 58 | 9th |
| 2015 | 24 Hours of Le Mans | Porsche Team | 1 | 1 | 0 | 0 | 1 | N/A | **1st** |
| 2016 | Formula One | Sahara Force India F1 Team | 21 | 0 | 0 | 1 | 0 | 72 | 9th |
| 2017 | Formula One | Renault Sport F1 Team | 20 | 0 | 0 | 0 | 0 | 43 | 10th |
| 2018 | Formula One | Renault Sport F1 Team | 21 | 0 | 0 | 0 | 0 | 69 | 7th |
| 2019 | Formula One | Renault F1 Team | 21 | 0 | 0 | 0 | 0 | 37 | 14th |
| 2020 | Formula One | BWT Racing Point F1 Team | 3 | 0 | 0 | 0 | 0 | 10 | 15th |
| 2021 | Formula One | Aston Martin Cognizant F1 Team | Reserve driver | | | | | | |
| 2021 | IndyCar | Arrow McLaren SP | Test driver | | | | | | |
| 2022 | Formula One | Aston Martin Aramco Cognizant F1 Team | 2 | 0 | 0 | 0 | 0 | 0 | 22nd |
| 2023 | Formula One | MoneyGram Haas F1 Team | 22 | 0 | 0 | 0 | 0 | 9 | 16th |
| 2024 | Formula One | MoneyGram Haas F1 Team | 24 | 0 | 0 | 0 | 0 | 41 | 11th |
| 2025 | Formula One | Stake F1 Team Kick Sauber | 24 | 0 | 0 | 0 | 1 | 51 | 11th |
| 2026 | Formula One | Audi Revolut F1 Team | 20 | 0 | 0 | 0 | 0 | 14* | 15th* |

* Season still in progress.

=== Single seater racing results ===
==== Complete Formula BMW ADAC results ====
(key) (Races in bold indicate pole position, races in italics indicate fastest lap)

| Year | Team | 1 | 2 | 3 | 4 | 5 | 6 | 7 | 8 | 9 | 10 | 11 | 12 | 13 | 14 | 15 | 16 | 17 | 18 | 19 | 20 | DC | Points |
|---|---|---|---|---|---|---|---|---|---|---|---|---|---|---|---|---|---|---|---|---|---|---|---|
| 2005 | Josef Kaufmann Racing | **HOC1**; **1**; 1 | HOC1; 2; 1 | **LAU**; **1**; 2 | LAU; 2; 1 | **SPA**; **1**; 4 | SPA; 2; 2 | **NÜR1**; **1**; 1 | **NÜR1**; **2**; 2 | BRN; 1; 3 | BRN; 2; 4 | **OSC**; **1**; 1 | OSC; 2; 4 | NOR; 1; 19† | NOR; 2; 1 | NÜR2; 1; 3 | NÜR2; 2; 4 | ZAN; 1; 1 | **ZAN**; **2**; 3 | **HOC2**; **1**; 6 | **HOC2**; **2**; 1 | 1st | 287 |

==== Complete German Formula Three Championship results ====
(key) (Races in bold indicate pole position, races in italics indicate fastest lap)

| Year | Team | 1 | 2 | 3 | 4 | 5 | 6 | 7 | 8 | 9 | 10 | 11 | 12 | 13 | 14 | 15 | 16 | 17 | 18 | 19 | 20 | DC | Points |
|---|---|---|---|---|---|---|---|---|---|---|---|---|---|---|---|---|---|---|---|---|---|---|---|
| 2006 | Josef Kaufmann Racing | **OSC1**; **1** Ret | **OSC1**; **2**; 2 | HOC; 1; 5 | **HOC**; **2**; 1 | LAU1; 1; 4 | LAU1; 2; 2 | NÜR1; 1; 16 | NÜR1; 2; 8 | NÜR2; 1; 5 | NÜR2; 2 Ret | ASS1; 1; 2 | ASS1; 2; 2 | LAU2; 1; 14 | LAU2; 2; 8 | ASS2; 1; 4 | ASS2; 2; 3 | SAL; 1; 7 | SAL; 2; 13 | OSC2; 1 | OSC2; 2 | 5th | 78 |

==== Complete A1 Grand Prix results ====
(key) (Races in bold indicate pole position; races in italics indicate fastest lap)

| Year | Entrant | 1 | 2 | 3 | 4 | 5 | 6 | 7 | 8 | 9 | 10 | 11 | 12 | 13 | 14 | 15 | 16 | 17 | 18 | 19 | 20 | 21 | 22 | DC | Points |
|---|---|---|---|---|---|---|---|---|---|---|---|---|---|---|---|---|---|---|---|---|---|---|---|---|---|
| 2006–07 | Germany | NED; SPR; 4 | NED; FEA; 1 | CZE; SPR; Ret | CZE; FEA; 4 | BEI; SPR; 5 | BEI; FEA; Ret | MYS; SPR; 2 | MYS; FEA; 1 | IDN; SPR; 5 | IDN; FEA; 2 | **NZL**; **SPR**; 1 | NZL; FEA; 1 | **AUS**; **SPR**; 1 | AUS; FEA; 1 | **RSA**; **SPR**; 1 | RSA; FEA; 1 | MEX; SPR | MEX; FEA | SHA; SPR; 3 | SHA; FEA; 3 | GBR; SPR; 2 | GBR; FEA; 1 | **1st** | **128** |

==== Complete Formula 3 Euro Series results ====
(key) (Races in bold indicate pole position; races in italics indicate fastest lap)

| Year | Entrant | Chassis | Engine | 1 | 2 | 3 | 4 | 5 | 6 | 7 | 8 | 9 | 10 | 11 | 12 | 13 | 14 | 15 | 16 | 17 | 18 | 19 | 20 | DC | Points |
|---|---|---|---|---|---|---|---|---|---|---|---|---|---|---|---|---|---|---|---|---|---|---|---|---|---|
| 2007 | ART Grand Prix | Dallara F305/021 | Mercedes | HOC; 1; 2 | HOC; 2; 7 | BRH; 1; 4 | BRH; 2; 6 | NOR; 1 Ret | NOR; 2; 1 | MAG; 1 Ret | MAG; 2; 14 | MUG; 1; 21 | MUG; 2; 14 | ZAN; 1; 6 | ZAN; 2; 1 | **NÜR**; **1**; 1 | NÜR; 2; 4 | **CAT**; **1**; 2 | CAT; 2; 8 | NOG; 1; 3 | NOG; 2; 3 | HOC; 1; 1 | HOC; 2; 7 | **3rd** | **72** |
| 2008 | ART Grand Prix | Dallara F308/009 | Mercedes | **HOC**; **1** Ret | HOC; 2 Ret | **MUG**; **1**; 1 | MUG; 2; 5 | PAU; 1 Ret | PAU; 2; 16 | **NOR**; **1**; 1 | NOR; 2 Ret | **ZAN**; **1**; 1 | ZAN; 2; 13 | NÜR; 1; 1 | NÜR; 2; 4 | **BRH**; **1**; 1 | BRH; 2; 5 | **CAT**; **1**; 1 | CAT; 2 Ret | LMS; 1; 24 | LMS; 2; 8 | **HOC**; **1**; 1 | HOC; 2; 3 | **1st** | **87** |

==== Complete GP2 Asia Series results ====
(key) (Races in bold indicate pole position; races in italics indicate fastest lap)

| Year | Entrant | 1 | 2 | 3 | 4 | 5 | 6 | 7 | 8 | 9 | 10 | 11 | 12 | DC | Points |
|---|---|---|---|---|---|---|---|---|---|---|---|---|---|---|---|
| 2008–09 | ART Grand Prix | CHN; FEA | CHN; SPR | DUB; FEA | DUB; SPR | **BHR1**; **FEA**; 4 | BHR1; SPR; 4 | **QAT**; **FEA**; 1 | QAT; SPR; 3 | MYS; FEA | MYS; SPR | BHR2; FEA | BHR2; SPR | 6th | 27 |

==== Complete GP2 Series results ====
(key) (Races in bold indicate pole position; races in italics indicate fastest lap)

| Year | Entrant | 1 | 2 | 3 | 4 | 5 | 6 | 7 | 8 | 9 | 10 | 11 | 12 | 13 | 14 | 15 | 16 | 17 | 18 | 19 | 20 | DC | Points |
|---|---|---|---|---|---|---|---|---|---|---|---|---|---|---|---|---|---|---|---|---|---|---|---|
| 2009 | ART Grand Prix | ESP; FEA; 9 | ESP; SPR; 14 | MON; FEA; 5 | MON; SPR; 3 | **TUR**; **FEA**; 5 | TUR; SPR; 4 | GBR; FEA; 3 | GBR; SPR; 5 | **GER**; **FEA**; 1 | GER; SPR; 1 | HUN; FEA; 1 | HUN; SPR; 7 | **VAL**; **FEA**; 2 | VAL; SPR; 1 | BEL; FEA; 2 | BEL; SPR; Ret | ITA; FEA; 6 | ITA; SPR; 3 | POR; FEA; 1 | POR; SPR; 16 | **1st** | **100** |

==== Complete Formula One results ====
(key) (Races in bold indicate pole position; races in italics indicate fastest lap)

| Year | Entrant | Chassis | Engine | 1 | 2 | 3 | 4 | 5 | 6 | 7 | 8 | 9 | 10 | 11 | 12 | 13 | 14 | 15 | 16 | 17 | 18 | 19 | 20 | 21 | 22 | 23 | 24 | WDC | Points |
|---|---|---|---|---|---|---|---|---|---|---|---|---|---|---|---|---|---|---|---|---|---|---|---|---|---|---|---|---|---|
| 2010 | AT&T Williams | Williams FW32 | Cosworth CA2010 2.4 V8 | BHR; 14 | AUS; Ret | MAL; 10 | CHN; 15 | ESP; 16 | MON; Ret | TUR; 17 | CAN; 13 | EUR; Ret | GBR; 10 | GER; 13 | HUN; 6 | BEL; 14 | ITA; 7 | SIN; 10 | JPN; Ret | KOR; 10 | **BRA**; 8 | ABU; 16 | | | | | | 14th | 22 |
| 2011 | Force India F1 Team | Force India VJM04 | Mercedes FO 108Y 2.4 V8 | AUS; TD | MAL; TD | CHN; TD | TUR; TD | ESP; TD | MON | CAN; TD | EUR; TD | GBR; TD | GER; TD | HUN; TD | BEL; TD | ITA; TD | SIN | JPN; TD | | | | | | | | | | – | – |
| 2011 | Sahara Force India F1 Team | Force India VJM04 | Mercedes FO 108Y 2.4 V8 | | | | | | | | | | | | | | | | KOR | IND | ABU | BRA; TD | | | | | | – | – |
| 2012 | Sahara Force India F1 Team | Force India VJM05 | Mercedes FO 108Z 2.4 V8 | AUS; Ret | MAL; 9 | CHN; 15 | BHR; 12 | ESP; 10 | MON; 8 | CAN; 12 | EUR; 5 | GBR; 12 | GER; 9 | HUN; 11 | BEL; 4 | ITA; 21^{†} | SIN; 14 | JPN; 7 | KOR; 6 | IND; 8 | ABU; Ret | USA; 8 | BRA; 5 | | | | | 11th | 63 |
| 2013 | Sauber F1 Team | Sauber C32 | Ferrari 056 2.4 V8 | AUS; DNS | MAL; 8 | CHN; 10 | BHR; 12 | ESP; 15 | MON; 11 | CAN; Ret | GBR; 10 | GER; 10 | HUN; 11 | BEL; 13 | ITA; 5 | SIN; 9 | KOR; 4 | JPN; 6 | IND; 19^{†} | ABU; 14 | USA; 6 | BRA; 8 | | | | | | 10th | 51 |
| 2014 | Sahara Force India F1 Team | Force India VJM07 | Mercedes PU106A Hybrid 1.6 V6 t | AUS; 6 | MAL; 5 | BHR; 5 | CHN; 6 | ESP; 10 | MON; 5 | CAN; 5 | AUT; 9 | GBR; 8 | GER; 7 | HUN; Ret | BEL; 10 | ITA; 12 | SIN; 9 | JPN; 8 | RUS; 12 | USA; Ret | BRA; 8 | ABU; 6 | | | | | | 9th | 96 |
| 2015 | Sahara Force India F1 Team | Force India VJM08 | Mercedes PU106B Hybrid 1.6 V6 t | AUS; 7 | MAL; 14 | CHN; Ret | BHR; 13 | ESP; 15 | MON; 11 | CAN; 8 | AUT; 6 | | | | | | | | | | | | | | | | | 10th | 58 |
| 2015 | Sahara Force India F1 Team | Force India VJM08B | Mercedes PU106B Hybrid 1.6 V6 t | | | | | | | | | GBR; 7 | HUN; Ret | BEL; DNS | ITA; 7 | SIN; Ret | JPN; 6 | RUS; Ret | USA; Ret | MEX; 7 | BRA; 6 | ABU; 7 | | | | | | 10th | 58 |
| 2016 | Sahara Force India F1 Team | Force India VJM09 | Mercedes PU106C Hybrid 1.6 V6 t | AUS; 7 | BHR; 15 | CHN; 15 | RUS; Ret | ESP; Ret | MON; 6 | CAN; 8 | EUR; 9 | AUT; 19^{†} | GBR; 7 | HUN; 10 | GER; 7 | BEL; 4 | ITA; 10 | SIN; Ret | MAL; 8 | JPN; 8 | USA; Ret | MEX; 7 | BRA; 7 | ABU; 7 | | | | 9th | 72 |
| 2017 | Renault Sport F1 Team | Renault R.S.17 | Renault R.E.17 1.6 V6 t | AUS; 11 | CHN; 12 | BHR; 9 | RUS; 8 | ESP; 6 | MON; Ret | CAN; 8 | AZE; Ret | AUT; 13 | GBR; 6 | HUN; 17^{†} | BEL; 6 | ITA; 13 | SIN; Ret | MAL; 16 | JPN; Ret | USA; Ret | MEX; Ret | BRA; 10 | ABU; 6 | | | | | 10th | 43 |
| 2018 | Renault Sport F1 Team | Renault R.S.18 | Renault R.E.18 1.6 V6 t | AUS; 7 | BHR; 6 | CHN; 6 | AZE; Ret | ESP; Ret | MON; 8 | CAN; 7 | FRA; 9 | AUT; Ret | GBR; 6 | GER; 5 | HUN; 12 | BEL; Ret | ITA; 13 | SIN; 10 | RUS; 12 | JPN; Ret | USA; 6 | MEX; 6 | BRA; Ret | ABU; Ret | | | | 7th | 69 |
| 2019 | Renault F1 Team | Renault R.S.19 | Renault E-Tech 19 1.6 V6 t | AUS; 7 | BHR; 17^{†} | CHN; Ret | AZE; 14 | ESP; 13 | MON; 13 | CAN; 7 | FRA; 8 | AUT; 13 | GBR; 10 | GER; Ret | HUN; 12 | BEL; 8 | ITA; 5 | SIN; 9 | RUS; 10 | JPN; DSQ | MEX; 10 | USA; 9 | BRA; 15 | ABU; 12 | | | | 14th | 37 |
| 2020 | BWT Racing Point F1 Team | Racing Point RP20 | Mercedes M11 EQ Performance 1.6 V6 t | AUT | STY | HUN | GBR; DNS | 70A; 7 | ESP | BEL | ITA | TUS | RUS | EIF; 8 | POR | EMI | TUR | BHR | SKH | ABU | | | | | | | | 15th | 10 |
| 2022 | Aston Martin Aramco Cognizant F1 Team | Aston Martin AMR22 | Mercedes F1 M13 E Performance 1.6 V6 t | BHR; 17 | SAU; 12 | AUS | EMI | MIA | ESP | MON | AZE | CAN | GBR | AUT | FRA | HUN | BEL | NED | ITA | SIN | JPN | USA | MXC | SAP | ABU | | | 22nd | 0 |
| 2023 | MoneyGram Haas F1 Team | Haas VF-23 | Ferrari 066/10 1.6 V6 t | BHR; 15 | SAU; 12 | AUS; 7 | AZE; 17 | MIA; 15 | MON; 17 | ESP; 15 | CAN; 15 | AUT; Ret^{6} | GBR; 13 | HUN; 14 | BEL; 18 | NED; 12 | ITA; 17 | SIN; 13 | JPN; 14 | QAT; 16 | USA; 11 | MXC; 13 | SAP; 12 | LVG; 19† | ABU; 15 | | | 16th | 9 |
| 2024 | MoneyGram Haas F1 Team | Haas VF-24 | Ferrari 066/10 1.6 V6 t | BHR; 16 | SAU; 10 | AUS; 9 | JPN; 11 | CHN; 10 | MIA; 11^{7} | EMI; 11 | MON; Ret | CAN; 11 | ESP; 11 | AUT; 6 | GBR; 6 | HUN; 13 | BEL; 18 | NED; 11 | ITA; 17 | AZE; 11 | SIN; 9 | USA; 8^{8} | MXC; 9 | SAP; DSQ | LVG; 8 | QAT; Ret^{7} | ABU; 8 | 11th | 41 |
| 2025 | Stake F1 Team Kick Sauber | Kick Sauber C45 | Ferrari 066/12 1.6 V6 t | AUS; 7 | CHN; 15 | JPN; 16 | BHR; DSQ | SAU; 15 | MIA; 14 | EMI; 12 | MON; 16 | ESP; 5 | CAN; 8 | AUT; 9 | GBR; 3 | BEL; 12 | HUN; 13 | NED; 14 | ITA; DNS | AZE; 16 | SIN; 20 | USA; 8 | MXC; Ret | SAP; 9 | LVG; 7 | QAT; Ret | ABU; 9 | 11th | 51 |
| 2026 | Audi Revolut F1 Team | Audi R26 | Audi AFR 26 Hybrid 1.6 V6 t | AUS; DNS | CHN; 11 | JPN; 11 | MIA; Ret | CAN; 12 | MON; 13 | BCN; Ret | AUT; 12 | GBR; Ret | BEL; 13 | HUN; 9 | NED; 8 | ITA; 12 | ESP; 10 | AZE; 11 | BHR; 11 | SIN; 8^{7} | USA; 11 | MXC; 14 | SAP; 10 | LVG | QAT | ABU | | 15th* | 14* |

^{†} Did not finish, but was classified as he had completed more than 90% of the race distance.
* Season still in progress.

=== Sports car racing results ===
==== 24 Hours of Le Mans results ====
| Year | Team | Co-Drivers | Car | Class | Laps | Pos. | Class Pos. |
|---|---|---|---|---|---|---|---|
| 2015 | (Germany) Porsche Team | (United Kingdom) Nick Tandy (New Zealand) Earl Bamber | Porsche 919 Hybrid | LMP1 | 395 | **1st** | **1st** |

==== Complete FIA World Endurance Championship results ====
| Year | Entrant | Class | Chassis | Engine | 1 | 2 | 3 | 4 | 5 | 6 | 7 | 8 | Rank | Points |
|---|---|---|---|---|---|---|---|---|---|---|---|---|---|---|
| 2015 | Porsche Team | LMP1 | Porsche 919 Hybrid | Porsche 2.0 L Turbo V4 (Hybrid) | SIL | SPA; 6 | LMS; 1 | NÜR | COA | FUJ | SHA | BHR | 9th | 58 |

== Notes ==
Sporting positions
| Preceded by Sebastian Vettel | Formula BMW ADAC; Champion; 2005 | Succeeded by Christian Vietoris |
| Preceded by Nicolas Lapierre; Alexandre Prémat (Team France) | A1 Grand Prix; Champion (Team Germany); 2006–07; With: Christian Vietoris | Succeeded by Neel Jani (Team Switzerland) |
| Preceded by Paul di Resta | Formula Three Masters; Winner; 2007 | Succeeded by Jules Bianchi |
| Preceded by Romain Grosjean | Formula 3 Euro Series; Champion; 2008 | Succeeded by Jules Bianchi |
| Preceded by Giorgio Pantano | GP2 Series; Champion; 2009 | Succeeded by Pastor Maldonado |
| Preceded by Marcel Fässler; André Lotterer; Benoît Tréluyer | Winner of the 24 Hours of Le Mans; 2015; With: Earl Bamber & Nick Tandy | Succeeded by Romain Dumas; Neel Jani; Marc Lieb |
