= 2006 Formula Renault 2.0 UK Championship =

Seasons
- ← 2005 2007 →

The 2006 Formula Renault 2.0 UK Championship was the 18th British Formula Renault Championship season. The season began at Brands Hatch on April 9 and finished at Silverstone on October 15, after twenty rounds. The championship was won by Sebastian Hohenthal with Fabio Onidi winning the Graduate Cup.

== Teams and drivers ==
Team	No.	Driver name	Class	Rounds
Manor Motorsport	1	(Finland) Valle Mäkelä		2–7
Manor Motorsport	2	(France) Franck Mailleux		All
Manor Motorsport	14	(Portugal) João Vasconcelos		2–5, 8–10
Manor Motorsport	27	(China) Cong Fu Cheng		All
Fortec Motorsports	3	(United Kingdom) James Sutton		All
Fortec Motorsports	4	(Italy) Fabio Onidi	G	All
Fortec Motorsports	11	(United Kingdom) Sam Bird		All
Fortec Motorsports	12	(Sweden) Sebastian Hohenthal		All
Comtec Racing	5	(United Kingdom) Pippa Mann		1–3, 6–10
AKA Lemac	6	(United Kingdom) Jeremy Metcalfe		All
AKA Lemac	7	(Republic of Ireland) Patrick Hogan		All
AKA Lemac	8	(United Kingdom) Peter Rees		All
AKA Lemac	16	(United Kingdom) Michael Meadows		9
Coles Racing	9	(United Kingdom) Josh Fisher		1–7
Coles Racing	9	(United Kingdom) Oli Poyser		8–9
Coles Racing	9	(United Kingdom) Kris Loane	G	10
Coles Racing	10	(United Kingdom) Dean Smith	G	All
Sywell Leisure Sports	15	(United Kingdom) Jodie Hemming		5–6, 8, 10
Position 1 Racing	17	(India) Armaan Ebrahim	G	All
Position 1 Racing	24	(United Kingdom) Richard Keen		1–7
Position 1 Racing	66	(Switzerland) Ronnie Theiler		10
Falcon Motorsport	18	(Republic of Ireland) Henry O'Friel		1–3, 5
Nexa Racing	20	(Finland) Valle Mäkelä		1
Nexa Racing	20	(South Africa) Armani Jamrozinski		2–10
Nexa Racing	21	(Sweden) Daniel Roos	G	All
Scorpio Motorsport	22	(United Kingdom) Will Bratt		All
Scorpio Motorsport	42	(United Kingdom) David Epton		2–10
Jamun Racing Services	23	(United Kingdom) Duncan Tappy		1–8
Mark Burdett Motorsport	25	(Norway) Stian Sørlie		1–6
Mark Burdett Motorsport	26	(Finland) Markus Niemelä		All
R S Racing	28	(United Kingdom) Richard Singleton	G	10
C F Racing	29	(United Kingdom) Hywel Lloyd		10
Eurotek Motorsport	30	(United Kingdom) Emma Selway	G	10
Eurotek Motorsport	31	(United Kingdom) Jordan Oakes	G	10
Robertshaw Racing	32	(United Kingdom) Alex Williams	G	All
Borthwick Motorsports	33	(United Kingdom) Ryan Borthwick	G	10
Welch Motorsport	43	(United Kingdom) Daniel Welch		8–10
Welch Motorsport	44	(United Kingdom) Chris Murray		10
Russell Racing	46	(United Kingdom) Matt Russell		All
Macob Motorsport	50	(United Kingdom) Tiffany Chittenden		5–7
Macob Motorsport	55	(United Kingdom) Alex Morgan	G	All
Filsell Motorsport	99	(United Kingdom) Matt Howson	G	10

== Calendar ==
All races held in United Kingdom.

Round	Circuit	Date	Pole position	Fastest lap	Winning driver	Winning team
1	Brands Hatch Indy	April 9	(United Kingdom) James Sutton	(United Kingdom) James Sutton	(United Kingdom) James Sutton	Fortec Motorsports
2	Brands Hatch Indy	April 9	(United Kingdom) James Sutton	(Republic of Ireland) Patrick Hogan	(Republic of Ireland) Patrick Hogan	AKA Lemac
3	Oulton Park	May 13	(Finland) Markus Niemelä	(Finland) Markus Niemelä	(Finland) Markus Niemelä	Mark Burdett Motorsport
4	Oulton Park	May 14	(United Kingdom) Sam Bird	(United Kingdom) Josh Fisher	(United Kingdom) Will Bratt	Scorpio Motorsport
5	Thruxton	June 4	(Sweden) Sebastian Hohenthal	(Sweden) Sebastian Hohenthal	(Republic of Ireland) Patrick Hogan	AKA Lemac
6	Thruxton	June 4	(Republic of Ireland) Patrick Hogan	(United Kingdom) Sam Bird	(Republic of Ireland) Patrick Hogan	AKA Lemac
7	Knockhill	June 18	(Sweden) Sebastian Hohenthal	(Sweden) Sebastian Hohenthal	(Sweden) Sebastian Hohenthal	Fortec Motorsports
8	Knockhill	June 18	(United Kingdom) Sam Bird	(Sweden) Sebastian Hohenthal	(United Kingdom) Sam Bird	Fortec Motorsports
9	Croft	July 15	(Republic of Ireland) Patrick Hogan	(United Kingdom) Sam Bird	(United Kingdom) Sam Bird	Fortec Motorsports
10	Croft	July 16	(Republic of Ireland) Patrick Hogan	(Sweden) Sebastian Hohenthal	(Republic of Ireland) Patrick Hogan	AKA Lemac
11	Donington Park National	July 30	(Sweden) Sebastian Hohenthal	(United Kingdom) Sam Bird	(Sweden) Sebastian Hohenthal	Fortec Motorsports
12	Donington Park National	July 30	(Sweden) Sebastian Hohenthal	(Republic of Ireland) Patrick Hogan	(Sweden) Sebastian Hohenthal	Fortec Motorsports
13	Snetterton	August 13	(Republic of Ireland) Patrick Hogan	(Republic of Ireland) Patrick Hogan	(Republic of Ireland) Patrick Hogan	AKA Lemac
14	Snetterton	August 13	(Republic of Ireland) Patrick Hogan	(Sweden) Sebastian Hohenthal	(Sweden) Sebastian Hohenthal	Fortec Motorsports
15	Donington Park International	September 10	(United Kingdom) Sam Bird	(United Kingdom) Sam Bird	(United Kingdom) Sam Bird	Fortec Motorsports
16	Donington Park International	September 10	(Sweden) Sebastian Hohenthal	(Sweden) Sebastian Hohenthal	(Sweden) Sebastian Hohenthal	Fortec Motorsports
17	Brands Hatch Indy	September 24	(China) Cong Fu Cheng	(Sweden) Sebastian Hohenthal	(Sweden) Sebastian Hohenthal	Fortec Motorsports
18	Brands Hatch Indy	September 24	(United Kingdom) Sam Bird	(United Kingdom) Sam Bird	(United Kingdom) Sam Bird	Fortec Motorsports
19	Silverstone National	October 15	(United Kingdom) Sam Bird	(Republic of Ireland) Patrick Hogan	(Republic of Ireland) Patrick Hogan	AKA Lemac
20	Silverstone National	October 15	(United Kingdom) Sam Bird	(Republic of Ireland) Patrick Hogan	(Sweden) Sebastian Hohenthal	Fortec Motorsports

== Championship Standings ==
The season include 20 rounds. The final standing was established with the best 18 results of the season. A Graduate Cup (G) classification is also established for young drivers. The team standings include all two best results in each round without additional points for Fastest lap.

- Point system : 32, 28, 25, 22, 20, 18, 16, 14, 12, 11, 10, 9, 8, 7, 6, 5, 4, 3, 2, 1. In each race 2 points for Fastest lap.
- 2 races in each round between 30 miles (48 km) and 30 minutes.

Pos	Driver	(England) BHI		(England) OUL		(England) THR		(Scotland) KNO		(England) CRO		(England) DON		(England) SNE		(England) DGP		(England) BHI		(England) SIL		Points (1)	Points (G)
Pos	Driver	1	2	3	4	5	6	7	8	9	10	11	12	13	14	15	16	17	18	19	20	Points (1)	Points (G)
1	(Sweden) Sebastian Hohenthal	5	4	14	6	2	2	1	20	2	2	1	1	2	1	EX	1	1	3	5	1	481	
2	(Republic of Ireland) Patrick Hogan	3	1	Ret	2	1	1	5	3	22	1	2	2	1	2	12	3	6	5	1	3	481	
3	(China) Cong Fu Cheng	6	3	Ret	5	9	5	6	2	7	3	3	4	3	Ret	3	13	3	2	7	6	374	
4	(United Kingdom) Sam Bird	7	12	Ret	4	8	3	10	1	1	6	19	Ret	6	4	1	2	4	1	2	EX	373	
5	(United Kingdom) Jeremy Metcalfe	2	5	2	3	4	12	Ret	11	4	11	4	14	5	7	2	4	7	9	10	4	343	
6	(United Kingdom) James Sutton	1	2	4	Ret	3	9	2	Ret	5	7	5	8	12	3	10	21	4	7	21	8	314	
7	(Finland) Markus Niemelä	17	10	1	13	Ret	19	3	8	6	16	9	10	4	9	4	6	2	8	8	Ret	274	
8	(United Kingdom) Will Bratt	8	6	9	1	14	10	16	4	12	4	15	3	10	16	7	7	14	11	25	5	263	
9	(United Kingdom) Dean Smith (G)	16	17	6	10	10	15	15	7	9	Ret	6	9	14	15	5	8	9	10	4	Ret	211	155
10	(France) Franck Mailleux	10	11	Ret	9	6	17	EX	Ret	DNS	Ret	Ret	5	DNS	5	Ret	5	8	4	3	2	204	
11	(Italy) Fabio Onidi (G)	9	19	Ret	Ret	21	8	8	5	3	8	12	Ret	8	10	8	9	Ret	6	6	Ret	197	163
12	(United Kingdom) David Epton			13	12	12	4	18	6	11	12	8	6	Ret	DNS	6	Ret	Ret	13	9	7	174	
13	(Finland) Valle Mäkelä	14	14	7	8	5	7	4	10	13	10	13	13	15	14							161	
14	(United Kingdom) Richard Keen	4	7	12	11	7	6	11	19	8	5	14	7	DNS	DNS							160	
15	(Sweden) Daniel Roos (G)	15	8	10	15	17	16	7	Ret	20	14	16	16	7	6	Ret	19	10	21	16	14	139	112
16	(United Kingdom) Josh Fisher	11	9	3	24	16	11	EX	Ret	10	9	7	Ret	11	8							127	
17	(United Kingdom) Peter Rees	13	16	Ret	14	11	Ret	9	Ret	Ret	22	10	Ret	16	Ret	9	11	11	16	11	9	117	
18	(United Kingdom) Duncan Tappy	12	13	11	20	15	14	12	12	18	13	Ret	Ret	9	11	Ret	12					101	
19	(United Kingdom) Pippa Mann	22	18	15	18	13	Ret					11	11	13	12	11	10	12	Ret	Ret	Ret	87	
20	(Portugal) João Vasconcelos			5	16	20	Ret	Ret	13	14	Ret					Ret	14	Ret	15	18	11	67	
21	(United Kingdom) Matt Russell	19	21	Ret	17	Ret	18	13	16	16	20	20	17	18	17	Ret	18	13	22	14	16	63	
22	(United Kingdom) Alex Morgan (G)	21	20	16	19	22	21	14	17	17	17	23	15	17	19	13	17	Ret	17	Ret	18	58	50
23	(Norway) Stian Sørlie	18	Ret	8	17	19	13	Ret	9	Ret	Ret	Ret	DNS									55	
24	(India) Armaan Ebrahim (G)	20	15	DNS	23	18	22	Ret	14	15	18	18	Ret	19	13	Ret	Ret	Ret	12	Ret	15	54	53
25	(South Africa) Armani Jamrozinski			DNS	22	Ret	20	19	15	Ret	15	17	12	Ret	18	Ret	15	15	20	DNS	DNS	44	
26	(United Kingdom) Alex Williams (G)	24	22	Ret	21	Ret	23	17	18	19	19	21	19	Ret	Ret	Ret	16	16	19	Ret	Ret	25	25
27	(United Kingdom) Richard Singleton (G)																			13	13	16	16
28	(United Kingdom) Jordan Oakes (G)																			15	12	15	15
29	(United Kingdom) Oli Poyser															14	Ret	17	18			14	
30	(United Kingdom) Matt Howson																			Ret	10	11	
31	(United Kingdom) Daniel Welch															Ret	Ret	Ret	Ret	12	Ret	9	
32	(United Kingdom) Michael Meadows																	Ret	14			7	
33	(United Kingdom) Jodie Hemming									21	Ret	24	Ret			15	20			23	21	7	7
34	(United Kingdom) Hywel Lloyd																			17	19	6	6
35	(United Kingdom) Tiffany Chittenden									Ret	21	22	18	20	20							5	
36	(Switzerland) Ronnie Theiler																			Ret	17	4	4
37	(United Kingdom) Emma Selway (G)																			19	Ret	2	2
38	(United Kingdom) Kris Loane (G)																			20	20	2	2
39	(Republic of Ireland) Henry O'Friel	23	Ret	DNS	DNS	DNS	DNS			Ret	DNS											0	
40	(United Kingdom) Chris Murray																			22	22	0	
41	(United Kingdom) Ryan Borthwick (G)																			24	Ret	0	0

- (1) = Include only the 18 best results.
- (G) = Graduate Cup runners, include only the 10 best results.

Pos	Team	Points
1	Fortec Motorsport	1007
2	AKA Lemac	829
3	Manor Motorsport	709
4	Scorpio Motorsport	442
5	Coles Racing	352
6	Mark Burdett Motorsport	327
7	Position 1 Racing	218
8	Nexa Racing	198
9	Jamun Racing Services	108
10	Comtec Racing	87
11	Macob Motorsport	65
12	Russell Racing	64
13	Robertshaw Racing	26
14	Eurotek Motorsport	17
15	RS Racing	16
16	Filsell Motorsport	11
17	Sywell Leisure Sports	7
18	CF Racing	6
19	Falcon Motorsport	0
20	Borthwick Motorsport	0
