= 2005 Istanbul Park GP2 Series round =

(Turkey) 2005 Istanbul Park GP2 round
Round details
- Round 9 of 12 rounds in the 2005 GP2 Series
- Istanbul Park
- Location: Istanbul Park, Istanbul, Turkey
- Course: Permanent racing facility 5.338 km (3.317 mi)

GP2 Series

Feature race
- Date: 20 August 2005
- Laps: 34

Pole position
Driver	(Germany) Nico Rosberg	ART Grand Prix
- Time: 1:38.416

Podium
First	(France) Alexandre Prémat	ART Grand Prix
Second	(Italy) Giorgio Pantano	Super Nova International
Third	(Spain) Borja García	Racing Engineering

Fastest lap
Driver	(United States) Scott Speed	iSport International
- Time: 1:38.288 (on lap 34)

Sprint race
- Date: 21 August 2005
- Laps: 23

Podium
First	(Finland) Heikki Kovalainen	Arden International
Second	(United Kingdom) Adam Carroll	Super Nova International
Third	(Germany) Nico Rosberg	ART Grand Prix

Fastest lap
Driver	(France) Olivier Pla	DPR
- Time: 1:41.209 (on lap 23)

The 2005 Istanbul Park GP2 Series round was a GP2 Series motor race held on 20 and 21 August 2005 at Istanbul Park in Istanbul, Turkey. It was the ninth round of the 2005 GP2 Series season. The race weekend supported the 2005 Turkish Grand Prix.

== Classification ==
=== Qualifying ===
Pos.	No.	Driver	Team	Time	Gap	Grid
1	9	(Germany) Nico Rosberg	ART Grand Prix	1:38.416		1
2	1	(United States) Scott Speed	iSport International	1:38.531	+0.115	2
3	14	(France) José María López	DAMS	1:38.561	+0.145	3
4	7	(Italy) Giorgio Pantano	Super Nova International	1:38.690	+0.274	4
5	3	(Brazil) Nelson Piquet Jr.	Hitech Piquet Sports	1:38.820	+0.404	5
6	10	(France) Alexandre Prémat	ART Grand Prix	1:38.897	+0.481	6
7	8	(United Kingdom) Adam Carroll	Super Nova International	1:39.335	+0.919	7
8	17	(Italy) Gianmaria Bruni	Coloni Motorsport	1:39.533	+1.117	8
9	19	(Spain) Borja García	Racing Engineering	1:39.708	+1.292	9
10	6	(Japan) Hiroki Yoshimoto	BCN Competición	1:39.737	+1.321	10
11	20	(Spain) Juan Cruz Álvarez	Campos Racing	1:39.830	+1.414	11
12	18	(Switzerland) Neel Jani	Racing Engineering	1:39.982	+1.566	12
13	22	(Finland) Heikki Kovalainen	Arden International	1:40.040	+1.624	13
14	21	(Spain) Sergio Hernández	Campos Racing	1:40.064	+1.648	14
15	15	(United Kingdom) Fairuz Fauzy	DAMS	1:40.081	+1.665	15
16	25	(Italy) Ferdinando Monfardini	Durango	1:40.205	+1.789	16
17	4	(Brazil) Alexandre Negrão	Hitech Piquet Sports	1:40.295	+1.879	17
18	23	(France) Nicolas Lapierre	Arden International	1:40.629	+2.213	18
19	12	(Italy) Giorgio Mondini	DPR	1:40.749	+2.333	19
20	24	(Monaco) Clivio Piccione	Durango	1:40.770	+2.354	20
21	5	(Venezuela) Ernesto Viso	BCN Competición	1:40.794	+2.378	21
22	2	(Turkey) Can Artam	iSport International	1:40.952	+2.536	22
23	11	(France) Olivier Pla	DPR	1:40.956	+2.540	23
24	16	(Austria) Mathias Lauda	Coloni Motorsport	1:41.184	+2.768	24
107% time: 1:45.305

=== Feature race ===
Pos.	No.	Driver	Team	Laps	Time/Retired	Grid	Points
1	10	(France) Alexandre Prémat	ART Grand Prix	34	1:01:27.680	6	10
2	7	(Italy) Giorgio Pantano	Super Nova International	34	+0.336	4	8
3	19	(Spain) Borja García	Racing Engineering	34	+9.486	9	6
4	3	(Brazil) Nelson Piquet Jr.	Hitech Piquet Sports	34	+10.987	5	5
5	1	(United States) Scott Speed	iSport International	34	+13.076	2	6
6	14	(France) José María López	DAMS	34	+18.449	3	3
7	8	(United Kingdom) Adam Carroll	Super Nova International	34	+19.558	7	2
8	6	(Japan) Hiroki Yoshimoto	BCN Competición	34	+21.128	10	1
9	11	(France) Olivier Pla	DPR	34	+21.615	23	
10	22	(Finland) Heikki Kovalainen	Arden International	34	+28.630	13	
11	2	(Turkey) Can Artam	iSport International	34	+30.582	22	
12	4	(Brazil) Alexandre Negrão	Hitech Piquet Sports	34	+38.315	17	
13	12	(Italy) Giorgio Mondini	DPR	34	+40.033	19	
14	5	(Venezuela) Ernesto Viso	BCN Competición	34	+48.068	21	
15	20	(Spain) Juan Cruz Álvarez	Campos Racing	34	+50.424	11	
16	16	(Austria) Mathias Lauda	Coloni Motorsport	34	+52.408	24	
17	9	(Germany) Nico Rosberg	ART Grand Prix	32	+2 laps	1	2
Ret	25	(Italy) Ferdinando Monfardini	Durango	26	Did not finish	16	
Ret	24	(Monaco) Clivio Piccione	Durango	23	Did not finish	20	
Ret	23	(France) Nicolas Lapierre	Arden International	16	Did not finish	18	
Ret	17	(Italy) Gianmaria Bruni	Coloni Motorsport	16	Did not finish	8	
Ret	15	(United Kingdom) Fairuz Fauzy	DAMS	10	Did not finish	15	
Ret	21	(Spain) Sergio Hernández	Campos Racing	2	Did not finish	14	
Ret	18	(Switzerland) Neel Jani	Racing Engineering	0	Did not finish	12	
Fastest lap: Scott Speed (iSport International) — 1:38.288 (on lap 34)

=== Sprint race ===
Pos.	No.	Driver	Team	Laps	Time/Retired	Grid	Points
1	22	(Finland) Heikki Kovalainen	Arden International	23	43:48.581	10	6
2	8	(United Kingdom) Adam Carroll	Super Nova International	23	+7.900	2	5
3	9	(Germany) Nico Rosberg	ART Grand Prix	23	+8.556	17	4
4	1	(United States) Scott Speed	iSport International	23	+9.328	4	3
5	19	(Spain) Borja García	Racing Engineering	23	+11.341	6	2
6	3	(Brazil) Nelson Piquet Jr.	Hitech Piquet Sports	23	+18.360	5	1
7	14	(France) José María López	DAMS	23	+21.618	3	
8	7	(Italy) Giorgio Pantano	Super Nova International	23	+24.032	7	
9	17	(Italy) Gianmaria Bruni	Coloni Motorsport	23	+25.718	21	
10	6	(Japan) Hiroki Yoshimoto	BCN Competición	23	+34.197	1	
11	24	(Monaco) Clivio Piccione	Durango	23	+39.720	19	
12	5	(Venezuela) Ernesto Viso	BCN Competición	23	+39.750	14	
13	23	(France) Nicolas Lapierre	Arden International	23	+40.095	20	
14	10	(France) Alexandre Prémat	ART Grand Prix	23	+1:03.412	8	
15	2	(Turkey) Can Artam	iSport International	23	+1:03.799^{1}	11	
16	11	(France) Olivier Pla	DPR	23	+1:05.662^{1}	9	2
17	15	(United Kingdom) Fairuz Fauzy	DAMS	23	+1:17.374	22	
18	16	(Austria) Mathias Lauda	Coloni Motorsport	22	+1 lap	16	
19	4	(Brazil) Alexandre Negrão	Hitech Piquet Sports	22	+1 lap	12	
20	21	(Spain) Sergio Hernández	Campos Racing	20	+3 laps/DNF	23	
Ret	25	(Italy) Ferdinando Monfardini	Durango	18	Did not finish^{1}	18	
Ret	18	(Switzerland) Neel Jani	Racing Engineering	14	Did not finish	24	
Ret	20	(Spain) Juan Cruz Álvarez	Campos Racing	10	Did not finish	15	
Ret	12	(Italy) Giorgio Mondini	DPR	2	Did not finish	13	
Fastest lap: Olivier Pla (DPR) — 1:41.209 (on lap 23)

Notes

- ^1 – Can Artam, Olivier Pla and Fernando Monfardini were given a 25 second time penalty did not have all four tyres on their cars five minutes before the new start time.

== Standings after the round ==
Drivers' Championship standings

	Pos.	Driver	Points
	1	(Finland) Heikki Kovalainen	87
	2	(Germany) Nico Rosberg	78
	3	(United States) Scott Speed	59
	4	(France) Alexandre Prémat	53
1	5	(United Kingdom) Adam Carroll	41

Teams' Championship standings

Pos.	Team	Points
1	(France) ART Grand Prix	131
2	(Netherlands) Arden International	100
3	(United Kingdom) Super Nova International	77
4	(United Kingdom) iSport International	62
5	(Spain) Racing Engineering	51

- Note: Only the top five positions are included for both sets of standings.

Previous round: 2005 Hungaroring GP2 Series round	GP2 Series; 2005 season	Next round: 2005 Monza GP2 Series round
Previous round: none	Istanbul Park GP2 round	Next round: 2006 Istanbul Park GP2 Series round
