= ISport International =

British motor racing team

(United Kingdom) iSport International
- Founded: 2004
- Folded: 2014
- Team principal(s): Paul Jackson
- Former series: GP2 Series (Note: Operation Team at Russian Time team in 2014); GP2 Asia Series
- Noted drivers: (United Kingdom) Sam Bird (India) Karun Chandhok (Sweden) Marcus Ericsson (Germany) Timo Glock (Brazil) Bruno Senna (United States) Scott Speed (United Kingdom) Oliver Turvey (Italy) Davide Valsecchi (Netherlands) Giedo van der Garde (Venezuela) Ernesto Viso (United Arab Emirates) Andreas Zuber
- Teams' Championships: GP2 Series: 2007; GP2 Asia Series: 2009-10
- Drivers' Championships: GP2 Series: 2007: Timo Glock; GP2 Asia Series: 2009-10: Davide Valsecchi

iSport International was a British motor racing team that competed in the GP2 Series. The team was founded by Paul Jackson, Gavin Bickerton-Jones and Richard Selwin, former members of the Petrobras Junior Team in 2004, ahead of the inaugural GP2 season. Their factory is based in Carleton Rode near Norwich in the United Kingdom.

iSport's most successful season in GP2 came in 2007, when they won the teams' title, with Timo Glock winning the drivers' championship. The team finished second in 2008, and won the 2009–10 GP2 Asia Series drivers' and teams' championship. They pulled out of the GP2 series before the 2013 season, after encountering financial difficulties. iSport returned to motorsport in 2014, running a GP2 team for Russian Time.

== Racing history ==
=== GP2 Series ===
The inaugural season of the GP2 series saw iSport take the fastest time in the shoot-out for race numbers, giving drivers Scott Speed and Can Artam numbers 1 and 2 for the season. While the team was regularly fast at races, neither driver was able to win a race. Nevertheless, Speed finished third in the championship with consistent points-scoring finishes, whilst Artam was 22nd overall with two points. iSport finished the season in fourth place in the teams' championship. For 2006, Speed graduated to Formula One with a drive at Scuderia Toro Rosso and Artam left the series. iSport filled its seats with Ernesto Viso and Tristan Gommendy, the latter of whom was later replaced by Timo Glock at the mid-season point. Viso took the team's first two victories in the category and Glock added two more; the part-season driver overhauling his teammate's points tally to finish the year fourth overall in the drivers' standings, with Viso sixth and Gommendy 20th. iSport improved to third in the teams' championship.

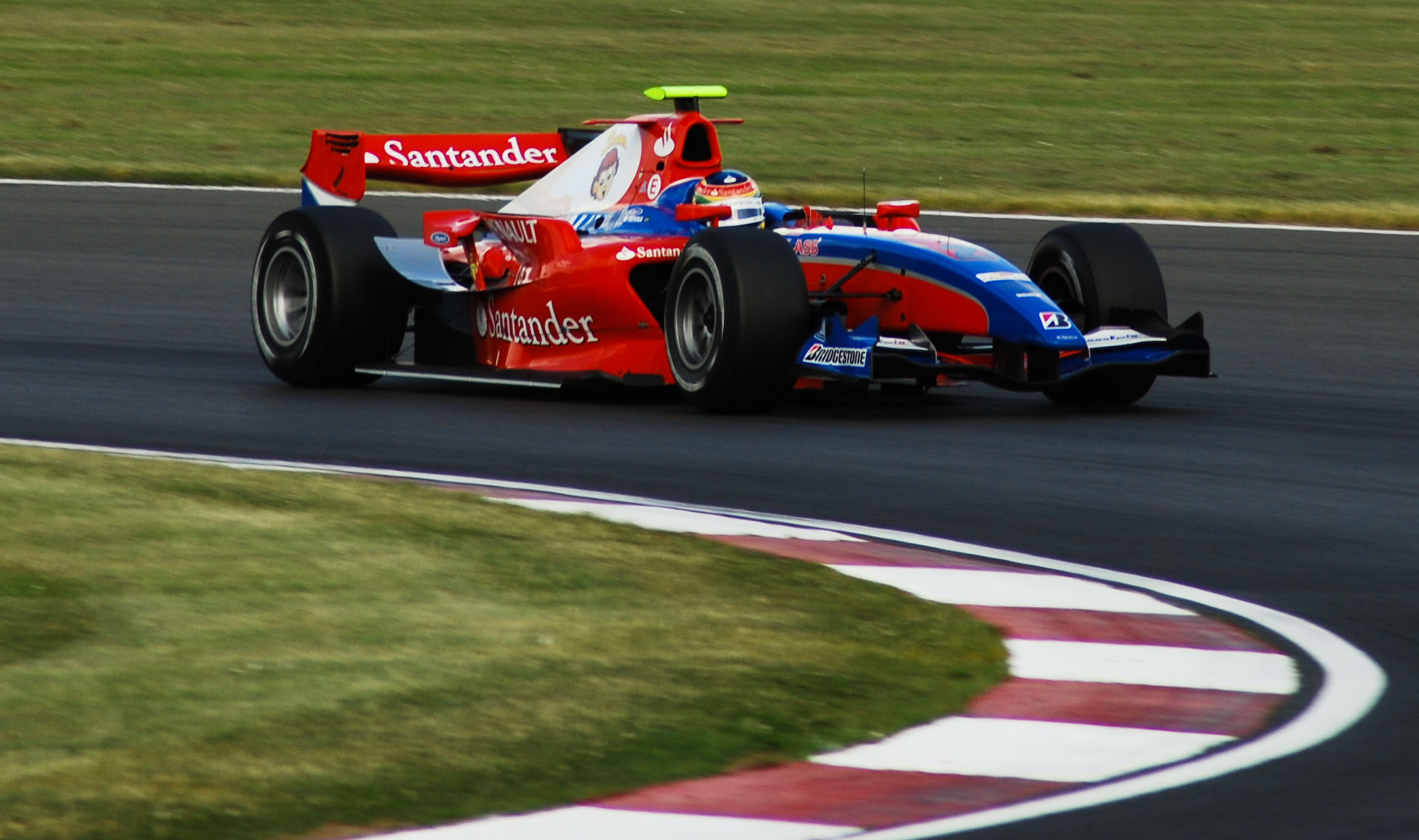
Bruno Senna driving for iSport at the 2008 Silverstone GP2 Series round.

Glock remained with the team for 2007 and was joined by 2006 race winner Andreas Zuber. Glock won five races on his way to the championship title, prevailing in a season-long duel with Lucas di Grassi (ART Grand Prix). Zuber supported him with a single further victory on his way to ninth overall, although the teammates embarrassingly collided whilst accelerating away from the front row of the grid at the feature race of the round held at Magny-Cours. To cap a successful year, iSport also won its first teams' championship. For the 2008 season, iSport joined the GP2 Asia Series in its inaugural year, signing Bruno Senna and Karun Chandhok. After a low-key Asia campaign, which saw the team finish fifth in the standings, the Senna-Chandhok combination was retained for the main series season, in which Senna emerged as champion Giorgio Pantano's main rival, accumulating two victories on his way to the runner-up position in the drivers' table. Chandhok also won a race and finished tenth overall; iSport ended the season second in the teams' championship to the Barwa International Campos Team.

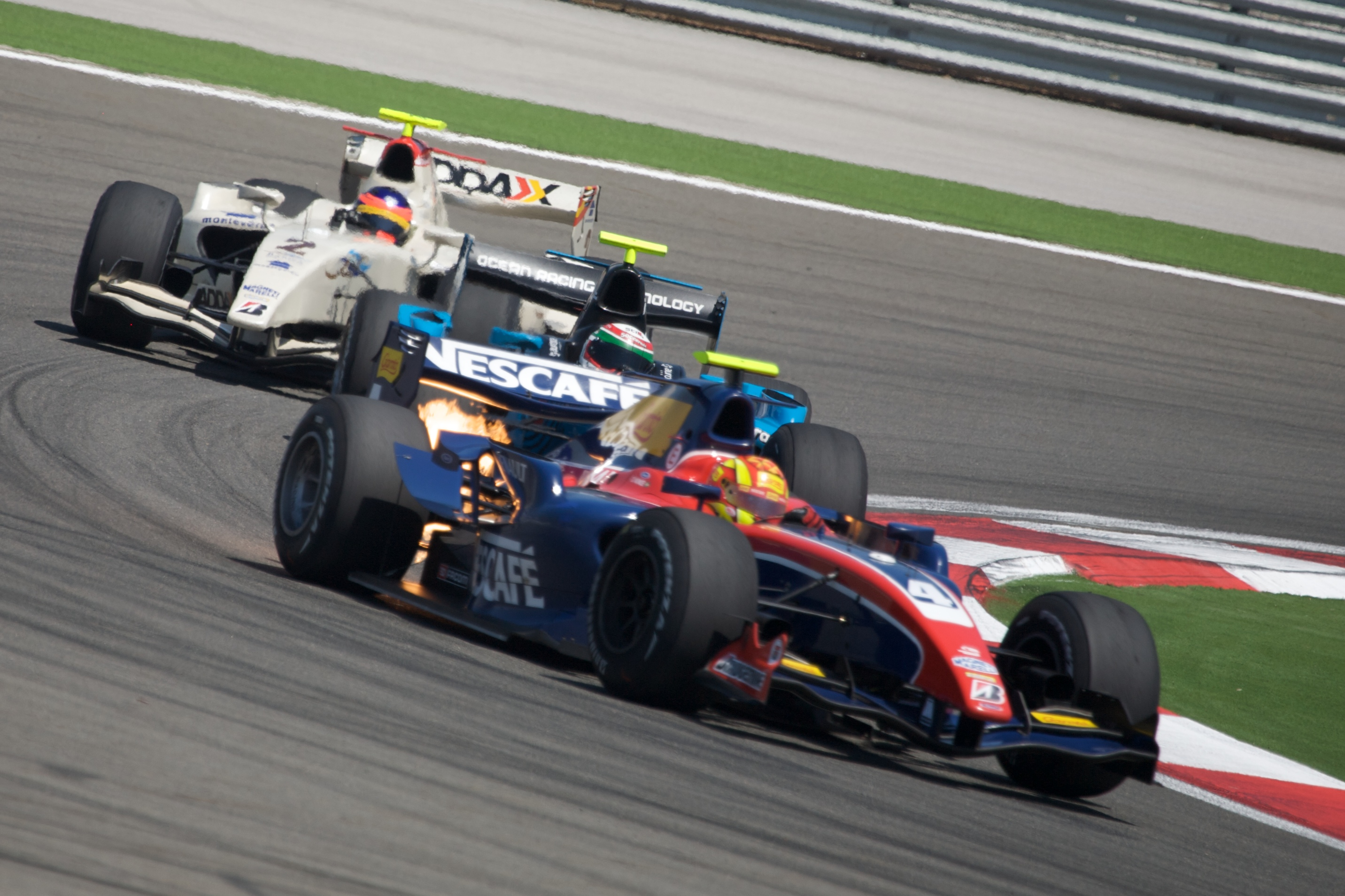
Diego Nunes (iSport) leads Álvaro Parente and Romain Grosjean at the 2009 Istanbul Park GP2 Series round.

For the 2008-09 Asia Series season, the departing driver line-up was replaced with reigning Formula Renault 3.5 Series champion Giedo van der Garde and a series-encouraged Asian driver, Hamad Al Fardan. Van der Garde and Al Fardan scored 13 points between them, resulting in an eighth-place championship finish for the team. For the 2009 main series, Van der Garde was retained with Diego Nunes replacing Al Fardan; Van der Garde won three races but only managed seventh in the drivers' championship, whilst Nunes was back in 20th. iSport finished fifth overall in the teams' championship. Both drivers then moved on, and were replaced by Davide Valsecchi and Oliver Turvey for both the 2009-10 Asia Series and the 2010 main series. In the Asia Series, Valsecchi won three races and sealed the championship title, with rookie driver Turvey backing him up to take sixth overall, allowing iSport to win the Asia teams' championship for the first time. In the main series, however, the team was unable to maintain this level of form: Valsecchi ended the season strongly with the outfit's sole victory at Yas Marina, but was overshadowed by Turvey, who concluded the year sixth in the drivers' championship to Valsecchi's eighth. iSport maintained its fifth place in the teams' championship.

iSport again signed two new drivers—Sam Bird and Marcus Ericsson—for the abortive 2011 Asia Series and the 2011 main series. On this occasion, neither driver won a race: Bird finished sixth in the final standings with a single position, with Ericsson four places behind him but the team improving to fourth overall. Ericsson was retained for 2012, with Jolyon Palmer signed from the Arden team to replace the Formula Renault 3.5-bound Bird. The drivers' fortunes improved, as they took a race victory apiece, but iSport slipped to sixth in the teams' championship at season's end.

The iSport GP2 contract was acquired by Russian Time for the 2013 season.

=== Formula One ===
The iSport team was believed to have been evaluating an entry to Formula One, but team principal Paul Jackson said that he was waiting for the FIA to finalise its plans to cap budgets in the sport before making any solid plans. "For many years I've said if the conditions were right and the numbers made sense, then we'd enter F1," said Jackson. "The budget cap could be the perfect opportunity for us, but until we find out what the magic number is, I don't know if it's do-able or feasible. When it's all in print, we'll look at it, start doing our sums and talking to potential investors." iSport's possible F1 entry was cancelled after they pulled out of GP2.

== Results ==
=== GP2 Series ===
Year	Car	Drivers	Races	Wins	Poles	F.L.	Points	D.C.	T.C.
2005	Dallara GP2/05-Mecachrome	(United States) Scott Speed	23	0	1	5	57.5	**3rd**	4th
2005	Dallara GP2/05-Mecachrome	(Turkey) Can Artam	23	0	0	0	2	22nd	4th
2006	Dallara GP2/05-Mecachrome	(Venezuela) Ernesto Viso	21	2	0	1	42	6th	**3rd**
2006	Dallara GP2/05-Mecachrome	(France) Tristan Gommendy	9	0	0	0	6	20th	**3rd**
2006	Dallara GP2/05-Mecachrome	(Germany) Timo Glock	12	2	0	1	58 (Note: Glock had scored 5 points for BCN Competición during the first 9 races of the season.)	4th	**3rd**
2007	Dallara GP2/05-Mecachrome	(Germany) Timo Glock	21	5	4	4	92	**1st**	**1st**
2007	Dallara GP2/05-Mecachrome	(United Arab Emirates) Andreas Zuber	21	1	1	2	30	9th	**1st**
2008	Dallara GP2/08-Mecachrome	(India) Karun Chandhok	20	1	0	0	31	10th	**2nd**
2008	Dallara GP2/08-Mecachrome	(Brazil) Bruno Senna	20	2	3	1	64	**2nd**	**2nd**
2009	Dallara GP2/08-Mecachrome	(Netherlands) Giedo van der Garde	20	3	0	0	34	7th	5th
2009	Dallara GP2/08-Mecachrome	(Brazil) Diego Nunes	20	0	0	0	8	20th	5th
2010	Dallara GP2/08-Mecachrome	(United Kingdom) Oliver Turvey	20	0	1	0	47	6th	5th
2010	Dallara GP2/08-Mecachrome	(Italy) Davide Valsecchi	20	1	1	0	31	8th	5th
2011	Dallara GP2/11-Mecachrome	(United Kingdom) Sam Bird	18	0	1	0	45	6th	4th
2011	Dallara GP2/11-Mecachrome	(Sweden) Marcus Ericsson	18	0	0	0	25	10th	4th
2012	Dallara GP2/11-Mecachrome	(Sweden) Marcus Ericsson	24	1	0	0	124	8th	6th
2012	Dallara GP2/11-Mecachrome	(United Kingdom) Jolyon Palmer	24	1	0	0	78	11th	6th

=== In detail ===
(key) (Races in bold indicate pole position) (Races in italics indicate fastest lap)

Year	Chassis Engine Tyres	Drivers	1	2	3	4	5	6	7	8	9	10	11	12	13	14	15	16	17	18	19	20	21	22	23	24	T.C.	Points
2005	GP2/05; Renault; **B**		SMR; FEA	SMR; SPR	CAT; FEA	CAT; SPR	MON; FEA	NÜR; FEA	NÜR; SPR	MAG; FEA	MAG; SPR	SIL; FEA	SIL; SPR	HOC; FEA	HOC; SPR	HUN; FEA	HUN; SPR	IST; FEA	IST; SPR	MNZ; FEA	MNZ; SPR	SPA; FEA	SPA; SPR	BHR; FEA	BHR; SPR		4th	69.5
2005	GP2/05; Renault; **B**	(United States) Scott Speed	3	Ret	**2**	3	4	16	12	15	18	4	2	4	3	Ret	19	5	4	Ret	15	4	4	Ret	19		4th	69.5
2005	GP2/05; Renault; **B**	(Turkey) Can Artam	16†	Ret	Ret	Ret	7	17	Ret	17	16	18	14	Ret	20	14	12	11	16	9	9	Ret	22†	17	16		4th	69.5
2006	GP2/05; Renault; **B**		VAL; FEA	VAL; SPR	SMR; FEA	SMR; SPR	NÜR; FEA	NÜR; SPR	CAT; FEA	CAT; SPR	MON; FEA	SIL; FEA	SIL; SPR	MAG; FEA	MAG; SPR	HOC; FEA	HOC; SPR	HUN; FEA	HUN; SPR	IST; FEA	IST; SPR	MNZ; FEA	MNZ; SPR				3rd	101
2006	GP2/05; Renault; **B**	(Venezuela) Ernesto Viso	8	2	6	1	6	11	8	1	Ret	Ret	8	10	Ret	5	4	4	4	Ret	13	Ret	10				3rd	101
2006	GP2/05; Renault; **B**	(France) Tristan Gommendy	Ret	11	Ret	17	13	12	5	5	Ret																3rd	101
2006	GP2/05; Renault; **B**	(Germany) Timo Glock										2	6	1	4	3	1	2	5	4	4	Ret	DNS				3rd	101
2007	GP2/05; Renault; **B**		BHR; FEA	BHR; SPR	CAT; FEA	CAT; SPR	MON; FEA	MAG; FEA	MAG; SPR	SIL; FEA	SIL; SPR	NÜR; FEA	NÜR; SPR	HUN; FEA	HUN; SPR	IST; FEA	IST; SPR	MNZ; FEA	MNZ; SPR	SPA; FEA	SPA; SPR	VAL; FEA	VAL; SPR				1st	118
2007	GP2/05; Renault; **B**	(Germany) Timo Glock	2	2	**2**	1	3	**Ret**	Ret	Ret	Ret	**1**	5	**10**	Ret	4	1	3	1	17	DNS	7	1				1st	118
2007	GP2/05; Renault; **B**	(United Arab Emirates) Andreas Zuber	3	Ret	DNS	9	Ret	Ret	15	**1**	6	Ret	21	3	6	Ret	14	Ret	5	18	12	12	12				1st	118
2008	GP2/08; Renault; **B**		CAT; FEA	CAT; SPR	IST; FEA	IST; SPR	MON; FEA	MON; FEA	MAG; FEA	MAG; SPR	SIL; FEA	SIL; SPR	HOC; FEA	HOC; SPR	HUN; FEA	HUN; SPR	VAL; FEA	VAL; SPR	SPA; FEA	SPA; SPR	MNZ; FEA	MNZ; SPR					2nd	95
2008	GP2/08; Renault; **B**	(India) Karun Chandhok	9	Ret	4	12	3	Ret	7	Ret	3	Ret	8	1	4	DNS	15†	Ret	10	7	11	Ret					2nd	95
2008	GP2/08; Renault; **B**	(Brazil) Bruno Senna	2	4	15	Ret	1	5	**Ret**	5	**6**	1	4	3	3	3	9	Ret	**11**	Ret	5	9					2nd	95
2009	GP2/08; Renault; **B**		CAT; FEA	CAT; SPR	MON; FEA	MON; FEA	IST; FEA	IST; SPR	SIL; FEA	SIL; SPR	NÜR; FEA	NÜR; SPR	HUN; FEA	HUN; SPR	VAL; FEA	VAL; SPR	SPA; FEA	SPA; SPR	MNZ; FEA	MNZ; SPR	ALG; FEA	ALG; SPR					5th	42
2009	GP2/08; Renault; **B**	(Netherlands) Giedo van der Garde	7	4	NC	11	15	13	Ret	13	12	Ret	7	1	14	Ret	6	1	1	6	Ret	6					5th	42
2009	GP2/08; Renault; **B**	(Brazil) Diego Nunes	11	8	Ret	14	11	11	11	Ret	Ret	11	Ret	15	11	5	9	3	10	Ret	12	5					5th	42
2010	GP2/08; Renault; **B**		CAT; FEA	CAT; SPR	MON; FEA	MON; SPR	IST; FEA	IST; SPR	VAL; FEA	VAL; SPR	SIL; FEA	SIL; SPR	HOC; FEA	HOC; SPR	HUN; FEA	HUN; SPR	SPA; FEA	SPA; SPR	MNZ; FEA	MNZ; SPR	YMC; FEA	YMC; SPR					5th	78
2010	GP2/08; Renault; **B**	(United Kingdom) Oliver Turvey	5	5	15	15	14	18	Ret	12	8	2	8	2	4	5	6	5	3	6	**2**	17					5th	78
2010	GP2/08; Renault; **B**	(Italy) Davide Valsecchi	10	11	Ret	16	**2**	4	10	6	7	6	17	18	9	3	18	8	9	16	5	1					5th	78
2011	GP2/11; Mecachrome; **P**		IST; FEA	IST; SPR	CAT; FEA	CAT; SPR	MON; FEA	MON; SPR	VAL; FEA	VAL; SPR	SIL; FEA	SIL; SPR	NÜR; FEA	NÜR; SPR	HUN; FEA	HUN; SPR	SPA; FEA	SPA; SPR	MNZ; FEA	MNZ; SPR							4th	70
2011	GP2/11; Mecachrome; **P**	(United Kingdom) Sam Bird	2	3	3	5	**Ret**	13	5	12	5	6	8	7	17	5	12	5	4	4							4th	70
2011	GP2/11; Mecachrome; **P**	(Sweden) Marcus Ericsson	9	8	5	3	Ret	Ret	Ret	11	3	4	5	16†	5	16	Ret	12	14	8							4th	70
2012	GP2/11; Mecachrome; **P**		SEP; FEA	SEP; SPR	BHR1; FEA	BHR1; SPR	BHR2; FEA	BHR2; SPR	CAT; FEA	CAT; SPR	MON; FEA	MON; SPR	VAL; FEA	VAL; SPR	SIL; FEA	SIL; SPR	HOC; FEA	HOC; SPR	HUN; FEA	HUN; SPR	SPA; FEA	SPA; SPR	MNZ; FEA	MNZ; SPR	MRN; FEA	MRN; SPR	6th	202
2012	GP2/11; Mecachrome; **P**	(Sweden) Marcus Ericsson	13	Ret	13	16	7	7	13	22	2	4	2	Ret	21	7	11	15	18	Ret	1	4	3	7	7	2	6th	202
2012	GP2/11; Mecachrome; **P**	(United Kingdom) Jolyon Palmer	17	12	DNS	7	24†	22	9	DNS	6	1	Ret	Ret	3	5	18	18	6	5	Ret	10	7	3	Ret	Ret	6th	202

=== GP2 Final ===
(key) (Races in bold indicate pole position) (Races in italics indicate fastest lap)

Year	Chassis Engine Tyres	Drivers	1	2	T.C.	Points
2011	GP2/11; Mecachrome; **P**		YMC; FEA	YMC; SPR	**1st**	**17**
2011	GP2/11; Mecachrome; **P**	(France) Tom Dillmann	6	3	**1st**	**17**
2011	GP2/11; Mecachrome; **P**	(Sweden) Marcus Ericsson	4	2	**1st**	**17**

=== GP2 Asia Series ===
Year	Car	Drivers	Races	Wins	Poles	Fast laps	Points	D.C.	T.C.
2008	Dallara GP2/08-Mecachrome	(India) Karun Chandhok	10	0	0	0	7	13th	5th
2008	Dallara GP2/08-Mecachrome	(Brazil) Bruno Senna	10	0	0	3	23	5th	5th
2008–09	Dallara GP2/08-Mecachrome	(Netherlands) Giedo van der Garde	11	0	0	0	11	12th	8th
2008–09	Dallara GP2/08-Mecachrome	(Bahrain) Hamad Al Fardan	11	0	0	0	2	20th	8th
2009–10	Dallara GP2/08-Mecachrome	(United Kingdom) Oliver Turvey	8	1	0	0	17	6th	**1st**
2009–10	Dallara GP2/08-Mecachrome	(Italy) Davide Valsecchi	8	3	1	4	56	**1st**	**1st**
2011	Dallara GP2/11-Mecachrome	(Sweden) Marcus Ericsson	4	0	0	0	9	6th	5th
2011	Dallara GP2/11-Mecachrome	(United Kingdom) Sam Bird	4	0	0	0	2	12th	5th

=== In detail ===
(key) (Races in bold indicate pole position) (Races in italics indicate fastest lap)

Year	Chassis Engine Tyres	Drivers	1	2	3	4	5	6	7	8	9	10	11	12	T.C.	Points
2008	GP2/05; Renault; **B**		DUB1; FEA	DUB1; SPR	SEN; FEA	SEN; SPR	SEP; FEA	SEP; SPR	BHR; FEA	BHR; SPR	DUB2; FEA	DUB2; SPR			5th	30
2008	GP2/05; Renault; **B**	(India) Karun Chandhok	7	3	Ret	13	Ret	7	8	Ret	Ret	Ret			5th	30
2008	GP2/05; Renault; **B**	(Brazil) Bruno Senna	2	19	7	2	Ret	8	4	DNS	DSQ	11			5th	30
2008–09	GP2/05; Renault; **B**		SHI; FEA	SHI; SPR	DUB3; FEA	DUB3; SPR	BHR1; FEA	BHR1; SPR	LSL; FEA	LSL; SPR	SEP; FEA	SEP; SPR	BHR2; FEA	BHR2; SPR	8th	13
2008–09	GP2/05; Renault; **B**	(Netherlands) Giedo van der Garde	10	DNS	4	C	7	14	12	8	14	10	5	7	8th	13
2008–09	GP2/05; Renault; **B**	(Bahrain) Hamad Al Fardan	15	Ret	Ret	C	12	Ret	Ret	Ret	9	5	Ret	17	8th	13
2009–10	GP2/05; Renault; **B**		YMC1; FEA	YMC1; SPR	YMC2; FEA	YMC2; SPR	BHR1; FEA	BHR1; SPR	BHR2; FEA	BHR2; SPR					**1st**	**73**
2009–10	GP2/05; Renault; **B**	(United Kingdom) Oliver Turvey	8	4	1	5	9	6	9	11					**1st**	**73**
2009–10	GP2/05; Renault; **B**	(Italy) Davide Valsecchi	**1**	2	2	1	1	20	2	4					**1st**	**73**
2011	GP2/11; Mecachrome; **P**		YMC; FEA	YMC; SPR	IMO; FEA	IMO; SPR									5th	11
2011	GP2/11; Mecachrome; **P**	(Sweden) Marcus Ericsson	4	3	10	16									5th	11
2011	GP2/11; Mecachrome; **P**	(United Kingdom) Sam Bird	7	Ret	Ret	Ret									5th	11

== Notes ==
Achievements
Preceded by ART Grand Prix	GP2 Series Teams' Champion; 2007	Succeeded by Campos Racing
Preceded by DAMS	GP2 Asia Series Teams' Champion; 2009–10	Succeeded by DAMS
