= Borja García (racing driver) =

Spanish racing driver

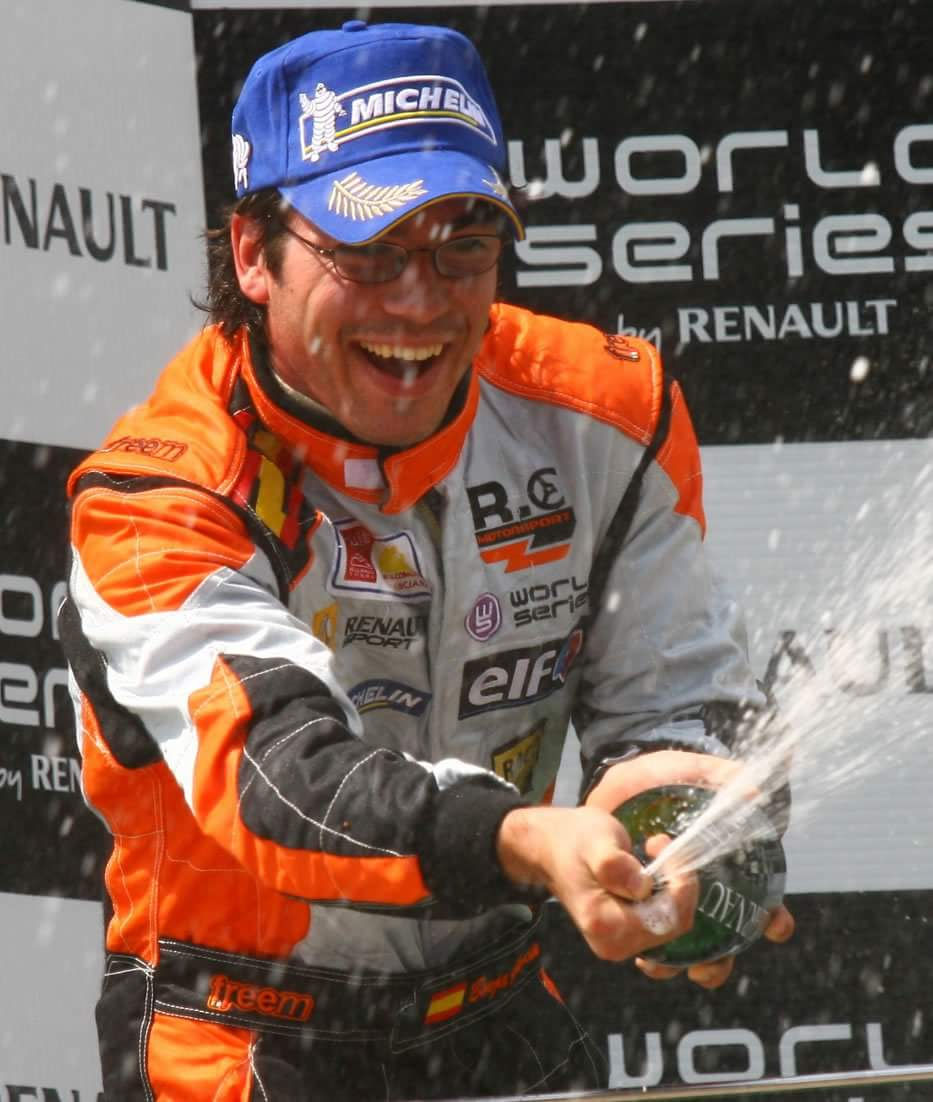
- Nationality: Spanish
- Born: 15 December 1982 (age 43) Valencia, Spain

NASCAR Whelen Euro Series career
- Debut season: 2013
- Categorisation: FIA Gold (until 2022); FIA Silver (2023–)
- Starts: 44
- Wins: 5
- Poles: 6
- Fastest laps: 7
- Best finish: 3rd in 2017
- Finished last season: 35th in 2018

Previous series
- 2013–2018 2008, 2010 2006, 2008 2005, 2007 2003–2004 2001–2002: NASCAR Whelen Euro Series; Superleague Formula; Formula Renault 3.5 Series; GP2 Series; Spanish F3 Championship; World Series by Nissan

Championship titles
- 2004: Spanish F3 Champion

Borja García Menéndez (born 15 December 1982 in Valencia) is a Spanish racing driver. He last competed in the NASCAR Whelen Euro Series, having last driven for Alex Caffi Motorsport in a part-time effort in 2018. He was the 2004 Spanish Formula Three champion, and raced in the inaugural GP2 Series season.

== Career ==
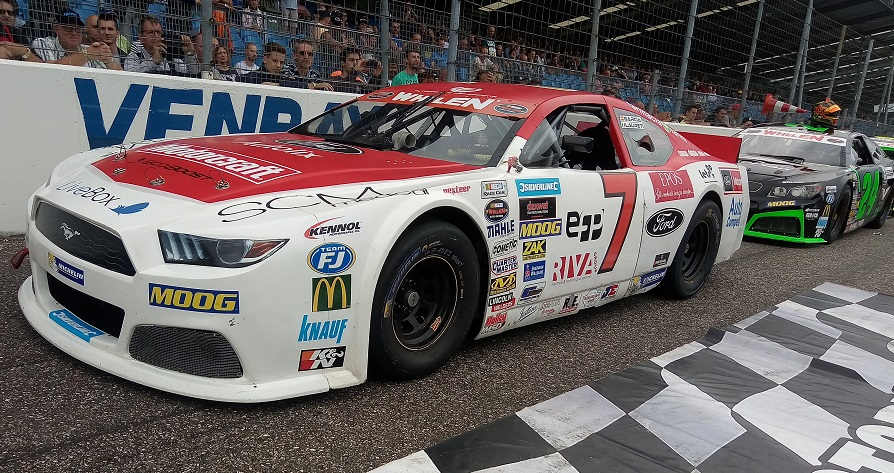
Garcia's Euro Series car at Venray in 2017

García was born in Valencia. His career started in karting in 1993, where he stayed until 1999. He moved up to Spanish Formula Toyota in 2000, comfortably winning the title, before moving to Formula Nissan 2000 in 2001 with the Campos team, who now raced in the GP2 Series. He stayed in Nissan 2000 for 2002, driving for both the Esuela Lois and Venturini teams, whilst also racing some of the Spanish Formula Three season for the GTA team.

García raced the full Spanish F3 season in 2003 with the same team, before moving to the Racing Engineering outfit in 2004 with whom he won the title. Due to his success he stayed with the team as they moved to GP2 Series for 2005, where he partnered with Neel Jani.

In 2006, García raced in the Formula Renault 3.5 Series championship for the RC Motorsport team, finishing second overall behind Alx Danielsson. He returned to GP2 in 2007, driving for Durango. He moved back to FR3.5 for 2008.

García was the driver of the Sevilla FC entry in the Superleague Formula for the 2008 season. He was the driver for all the rounds and Sevilla finished tenth in points with one win at the 2008 Donington round.

In 2009, García moved to the Atlantic Championship, where he would finish in seventh in the championship having scored three podium finishes.

García made his stock car racing debut in 2013, when he entered the NASCAR Whelen Euro Series season finale round at Le Mans for Ford Autolix Competition and would score a podium finish in his very first race in the series. He made his full season debut the following year, finishing fifth in the championship and scoring a victory at Nürburgring after García overtook pole sitter Ander Vilariño in the opening lap. After competing part-time in 2015, García returned to full-time competition in 2016 with SPV Racing and later Double T by MRT Nocentini, finishing 11th overall in the standings with four podium finishes.

In 2017, García began the season by sweeping both races in his home race in Valencia. He followed it up with two more victories at Venray and Hockenheim before ended up finishing third in the standings.

== Racing record ==
=== Complete Open Telefónica by Nissan results ===
(key) (Races in bold indicate pole position) (Races in italics indicate fastest lap)

Year	Entrant	1	2	3	4	5	6	7	8	9	10	11	12	13	14	15	16	DC	Points
2001	Campos Motorsport	JAR; 1; 12	JAR; 2; 15	EST; 1 Ret	EST; 2; 7	ALB; 1 Ret	ALB; 2 DNS	VAL; 1; 8	VAL; 2; 7	MNZ; 1 Ret	MNZ; 2; 9	MAG; 1; 11	MAG; 2; 3	CAT; 1; 6	CAT; 2 Ret	VAL; 1; 4	VAL; 2; 6	10th	47
2002	Escuela Lois Circuit	VAL; 1; 2	VAL; 2; 5	JAR; 1; 2	JAR; 2; 4	ALB; 1 Ret	ALB; 2; 9	MNZ; 1; 4	MNZ; 2; 7									3rd	131
2002	Venturini Racing									MAG; 1; 1	MAG; 2 Ret	**CAT**; **1**; 1	CAT; 2; 9	VAL; 1; 3	VAL; 2; 2			3rd	131

=== Complete Spanish Formula Three Championship results ===
(key) (Races in bold indicate pole position) (Races in italics indicate fastest lap)

Year	Entrant	1	2	3	4	5	6	7	8	9	10	11	12	13	14	DC	Points
2002	GTA Motor Competición	ALB; 1	ALB; 2	JER; 1	JER; 2	EST; 1	EST; 2	**VAL**; 1	**JER**; **1**; 1	**JER**; **2**; 1	JAR; 1; 1	JAR; 2; 2	**CAT**; **1**; 1	CAT; 2; 1		3rd	148
2003	GTA Motor Competición	**ALB**; **1**; 1	ALB; 2 Ret	JAR; 1; 9	JAR; 2; 2	JER; 1; 8	JER; 2; 2	EST; 1; 3	EST; 2; 5	VAL; 1; 2	VAL; 2; 1	JER; 4	CAT; 1; 6	CAT; 2; 2		3rd	182
2004	Racing Engineering	**ALB**; **1**; 1	ALB; 2; 1	JAR; 1; 13	JAR; 2; 6	**JER**; **1**; 1	JER; 2; 2	**EST**; **1**; 1	**EST**; **2**; 1	**VAL**; **1**; 9	VAL; 2; 1	**JER**; **1**; 1	**JER**; **2**; 1	**CAT**; **1**; 1	CAT; 2; 4	1st	149

=== Complete GP2 Series results ===
(key) (Races in bold indicate pole position) (Races in italics indicate fastest lap)

Year	Entrant	1	2	3	4	5	6	7	8	9	10	11	12	13	14	15	16	17	18	19	20	21	22	23	DC	Points
2005	Racing Engineering	IMO; FEA; Ret	IMO; SPR; 10	CAT; FEA; Ret	CAT; SPR; 10	MON; FEA; 10^{†}	NÜR; FEA; Ret	NÜR; SPR; EX	MAG; FEA; Ret	MAG; SPR; 12	SIL; FEA; 17	SIL; SPR; 9	HOC; FEA; 7	HOC; SPR; 5	HUN; FEA; 11	HUN; SPR; Ret	IST; FEA; 3	IST; SPR; 5	MNZ; FEA; Ret	MNZ; SPR; 10	SPA; FEA; 6	SPA; SPR; 2	BHR; FEA; 19	BHR; SPR; 17	14th	17.5
2007	Durango	BHR; FEA; 8	BHR; SPR; 4	CAT; FEA; 5	CAT; SPR; 14	MON; FEA; 16^{†}	MAG; FEA; 14	MAG; SPR; 20^{†}	SIL; FEA; 20^{†}	SIL; SPR; 17	NÜR; FEA; 19	NÜR; SPR; 12	HUN; FEA; 5	HUN; SPR; 5	IST; FEA; 5	IST; SPR; 4	MNZ; FEA; Ret	MNZ; SPR; 19	SPA; FEA; 16	SPA; SPR; 17	VAL; FEA; 5	VAL; SPR; 4			10th	28

=== Complete Formula Renault 3.5 Series results ===
(key) (Races in bold indicate pole position) (Races in italics indicate fastest lap)

Year	Entrant	1	2	3	4	5	6	7	8	9	10	11	12	13	14	15	16	17	DC	Points
2006	RC Motorsport	ZOL; 1; 3	ZOL; 2; 2	MON; 1 DNQ	IST; 1; 2	IST; 2 Ret	MIS; 1; 5	MIS; 2; 17	SPA; 1; 4	SPA; 2; 1	NÜR; 1; 2	NÜR; 2; 6	DON; 1; 6	DON; 2; 3	LMS; 1; 11	LMS; 2; 3	CAT; 1; 23	CAT; 2; 9	**2nd**	**107**
2008	RC Motorsport	MNZ; 1; 6	MNZ; 2 Ret	SPA; 1 Ret	SPA; 2; 15	MON; 1; 11	SIL; 1	SIL; 2	HUN; 1	HUN; 2	NÜR; 1	NÜR; 2	LMS; 1	LMS; 2	EST; 1	EST; 2	CAT; 1	CAT; 2	24th	5

=== Complete Superleague Formula results ===
==== 2008 ====
(Races in bold indicate pole position) (Races in italics indicate fastest lap)

Year	Team	1	2	3	4	5	6	7	8	9	10	11	12	13	14	15	16	17	18	19	20	21	22	23	24	Pos	Pts
2008	Sevilla FC GTA Motor Competición	DON; 1; 10	DON; 2; 1	NÜR; 1; 6	NÜR; 2; 8	ZOL; 1; 16	ZOL; 2; 8	EST; 1; 8	EST; 2; 7	VLL; 1; 17	VLL; 2; 13	JER; 1; 6	JER; 2; 11													10th	262
2010	Sporting CP Reid Motorsport	SIL; 1; 7	SIL; 2; 11	ASS; 1; 18	**ASS**; **2**; 5	MAG; 1; 11	MAG; 2; 5	JAR; 1; 18	**JAR**; **2**; 13	NÜR; 1; 12	NÜR; 2; 7	ZOL; 1	ZOL; 2	BRH; 1	BRH; 2	ADR; 1	ADR; 2	POR; 1	POR; 2	ORD; 1	ORD; 2	BEI; 1	BEI; 2	NAV; 1	NAV; 2	15th	329

==== Super Final results ====
(Races in bold indicate pole position) (Races in italics indicate fastest lap)

Year	Team	1	2	3	4	5	6	7	8	9	10	11	12
2010	Sporting CP Reid Motorsport	SIL; DNQ	ASS; DNQ	MAG; DNQ	JAR; DNQ	NÜR; DNQ	ZOL	BRH	ADR	POR	ORD	BEI	NAV

=== Complete Atlantic Championship results ===
(key) (Races in bold indicate pole position) (Races in italics indicate fastest lap)

Year	Entrant	1	2	3	4	5	6	7	8	9	10	11	12	DC	Points
2009	Condor Motorsports	SEB; 6	MIL; DSQ	NJ1; 3	NJ2; 5	LRP; 3	ACC1; 6	ACC2; 5	MOH; 3	CTR; 11	MOS; 7	ATL	LAG	7th	88

=== NASCAR ===
(key) (Bold – Pole position awarded by qualifying time. Italics – Pole position earned by points standings or practice time. * – Most laps led.)

==== Whelen Euro Series - Elite 1 ====
NASCAR Whelen Euro Series - Elite 1 results
Year	Team	No.	Make	1	2	3	4	5	6	7	8	9	10	11	12	NWES	Pts
2013	Ford Autolix Competition	19	Ford	NOG	NOG	DIJ	DIJ	BRH	BRH	TOU	TOU	MNZ	MNZ	BUG; 2	BUG; 16	25th	142
2014	Ford Autolix Competition	1	Ford	VAL; 21	VAL; 2	BRH; 5	BRH; 4	TOU; 8	TOU; 6	NÜR; 1**	NÜR; 2	UMB; 4	UMB; 4	BUG; 20	BUG; 11	5th	588
2015	Active Racing Competition	1	Ford	VAL; 4	VAL; 9	VEN	VEN	BRH	BRH	TOU	TOU	UMB	UMB	ZOL	ZOL	30th	75
2016	SPV Racing	1	Ford	VAL; 3*	VAL; 3	**VEN**; 3	VEN; 2	BRH; 5	BRH; 4	TOU; 8	TOU; 16					11th	480
2016	Double T by MRT Nocenti	6	Ford									ADR; 23	ADR; 22			11th	480
2016	Double T by MRT Nocenti	7	Ford											ZOL; 22	ZOL; 23	11th	480
2017	Alex Caffi Motorsport	1	Ford	**VAL**; 1**	VAL; 1*											3rd	600
2017	Racers Motorsport	7	Ford			BRH; 2	BRH; 9	VEN; 2	VEN; 1**	HOC; 1**	HOC; 6	FRA; 9	FRA; 15	ZOL; 6	ZOL; 6	3rd	600
2018	Alex Caffi Motorsport	1	Ford	VAL; 5	VAL; 5	FRA	FRA	BRH	BRH	TOU	TOU	HOC	HOC	ZOL	ZOL	35th	64

Sporting positions
Preceded by Ricardo Maurício	Spanish Formula Three champion 2004	Succeeded by Andy Soucek
