= 2005 Formula BMW ADAC season =

2005 Formula BMW ADAC

Seasons
- ← 2004 2006 →

The 2005 Formula BMW ADAC season was a multi-event motor racing championship for open wheel, formula racing cars held across Europe. The championship featured drivers competing in 1.2 litre Formula BMW single seat race cars. The 2005 season was the eighth Formula BMW ADAC season organized by BMW Motorsport and ADAC. The championship was contested over twenty races at ten meetings, one of them supporting the European Grand Prix.

Nico Hülkenberg was crowned series champion.

== Teams and drivers ==
- All cars are powered by BMW engines, and Mygale FB02 chassis.

Team	No	Driver	Class	Rounds
(Germany) Mücke Motorsport	2	(Austria) Martin Ragginger	R	All
(Germany) Mücke Motorsport	3	(Germany) Tobias Hegewald	R	All
(Germany) Mücke Motorsport	5	(Lithuania) Andzej Dzikevic		All
(Germany) Mücke Motorsport	16	(Switzerland) Sébastien Buemi		All
(Germany) Mücke Motorsport	31	(Portugal) João Urbano		All
(Germany) AM-Holzer Rennsport	4	(Latvia) Harald Schlegelmilch		1–8
(Germany) AM-Holzer Rennsport	11	(Germany) Marco Holzer		All
(Germany) AM-Holzer Rennsport	17	(Germany) Tim Sandtler		3–10
(Germany) Eifelland Racing	6	(Monaco) Stefano Coletti	R	All
(Germany) Eifelland Racing	8	(Germany) Christian Vietoris	R	All
(Germany) Eifelland Racing	14	(Italy) Fabio Onidi		1–9
(Germany) Eifelland Racing	33	(Germany) Marcel Jeleniowski		10
(Germany) Team Rosberg	7	(New Zealand) Chris van der Drift		All
(Germany) Team Rosberg	19	(United States) Jonathan Summerton		All
(Germany) Team Rosberg	20	(Finland) Henri Karjalainen		All
(Germany) Team Rosberg	21	(Germany) Jens Höing	R	All
(Germany) Team Rosberg	22	(Finland) Markus Niemelä		All
(Germany) Josef Kaufmann Racing	9	(Netherlands) Nick de Bruijn	R	All
(Germany) Josef Kaufmann Racing	10	(Switzerland) Natacha Gachnang		All
(Germany) Josef Kaufmann Racing	12	(Germany) Nico Hülkenberg	R	All
(Austria) HBR Motorsport	13	(Germany) Dominik Wasem		All
(Austria) HBR Motorsport	30	(Netherlands) Marco Idili	R	All
(Germany) Team Lauderbach Motorsport	15	(Germany) Benjamin Leuchter		1–4
(Germany) Team Lauderbach Motorsport	29	(Germany) Johnny Cecotto Jr.	R	1–6
(Germany) Team Lauderbach Motorsport	33	(Thailand) Robert Boughey		6
(Germany) Mamerow Racing	17	(Germany) Tim Sandtler		1–2
(Germany) Mamerow Racing	18	(Germany) Johnny Cecotto Jr.	R	7–10
(Czech Republic) Czech National Team	23	(Czech Republic) Jiri Micanek, Jr.		1, 5–10
(Germany) 4speed Media	26	(Mexico) Sergio Pérez	R	All
(Finland) KDF Motorsport	28	(Finland) Mika Mäki	R	All

Icon	Class
R	Rookie Cup

== Calendar ==
- The series supported the Deutsche Tourenwagen Masters at all rounds except the first Nürburgring round, which supported the European Grand Prix.

Round		Circuit	Date	Pole position	Fastest lap	Winning driver	Winning team	Rookie winner
1	R1	(Germany) Hockenheim	16 April	(Germany) Nico Hülkenberg	(Switzerland) Sébastien Buemi	(Germany) Nico Hülkenberg	(Germany) Josef Kaufmann Racing	(Germany) Nico Hülkenberg
1	R2	(Germany) Hockenheim	17 April	(Finland) Markus Niemelä	(Germany) Nico Hülkenberg	(Germany) Nico Hülkenberg	(Germany) Josef Kaufmann Racing	(Germany) Nico Hülkenberg
2	R1	(Germany) EuroSpeedway Lausitz	30 April	(Germany) Nico Hülkenberg	(Switzerland) Sébastien Buemi	(Switzerland) Sébastien Buemi	(Germany) Mücke Motorsport	(Germany) Nico Hülkenberg
2	R2	(Germany) EuroSpeedway Lausitz	1 May	(Netherlands) Nick de Bruijn	(Netherlands) Nick de Bruijn	(Germany) Nico Hülkenberg	(Germany) Josef Kaufmann Racing	(Germany) Nico Hülkenberg
3	R1	(Belgium) Circuit de Spa-Francorchamps	14 May	(Germany) Nico Hülkenberg	(Italy) Fabio Onidi	(Switzerland) Sébastien Buemi	(Germany) Mücke Motorsport	(Germany) Nico Hülkenberg
3	R2	(Belgium) Circuit de Spa-Francorchamps	15 May	(Switzerland) Sébastien Buemi	(New Zealand) Chris van der Drift	(New Zealand) Chris van der Drift	(Germany) Team Rosberg	(Germany) Nico Hülkenberg
4	R1	(Germany) Nürburgring	28 May	(Germany) Nico Hülkenberg	(Switzerland) Sébastien Buemi	(Germany) Nico Hülkenberg	(Germany) Josef Kaufmann Racing	(Germany) Nico Hülkenberg
4	R2	(Germany) Nürburgring	29 May	(Germany) Nico Hülkenberg	(Germany) Nico Hülkenberg	(Portugal) João Urbano	(Germany) Mücke Motorsport	(Germany) Nico Hülkenberg
5	R1	(Czech Republic) Masaryk Circuit, Brno	4 June	(Switzerland) Sébastien Buemi	(Switzerland) Sébastien Buemi	(Portugal) João Urbano	(Germany) Mücke Motorsport	(Germany) Nico Hülkenberg
5	R2	(Czech Republic) Masaryk Circuit, Brno	5 June	(Switzerland) Sébastien Buemi	(Switzerland) Sébastien Buemi	(Switzerland) Sébastien Buemi	(Germany) Mücke Motorsport	(Germany) Nico Hülkenberg
6	R1	(Germany) Motorsport Arena Oschersleben	25 June	(Germany) Nico Hülkenberg	(Switzerland) Sébastien Buemi	(Germany) Nico Hülkenberg	(Germany) Josef Kaufmann Racing	(Germany) Nico Hülkenberg
6	R2	(Germany) Motorsport Arena Oschersleben	26 June	(Switzerland) Sébastien Buemi	(Switzerland) Sébastien Buemi	(Switzerland) Sébastien Buemi	(Germany) Mücke Motorsport	(Netherlands) Nick de Bruijn
7	R1	(Germany) Norisring, Nuremberg	16 July	(Switzerland) Sébastien Buemi	(Switzerland) Sébastien Buemi	(Finland) Mika Mäki	(Finland) KDF Motorsport	(Finland) Mika Mäki
7	R2	(Germany) Norisring, Nuremberg	17 July	(Netherlands) Nick de Bruijn	(Germany) Nico Hülkenberg	(Germany) Nico Hülkenberg	(Germany) Josef Kaufmann Racing	(Germany) Nico Hülkenberg
8	R1	(Germany) Nürburgring	6 August	(Germany) Tim Sandtler	(Switzerland) Sébastien Buemi	(Switzerland) Sébastien Buemi	(Germany) Mücke Motorsport	(Germany) Nico Hülkenberg
8	R2	(Germany) Nürburgring	7 August	(Switzerland) Sébastien Buemi	(Switzerland) Sébastien Buemi	(Switzerland) Sébastien Buemi	(Germany) Mücke Motorsport	(Netherlands) Nick de Bruijn
9	R1	(Netherlands) Circuit Park Zandvoort	27 August	(Switzerland) Sébastien Buemi	(Germany) Nico Hülkenberg	(Germany) Nico Hülkenberg	(Germany) Josef Kaufmann Racing	(Germany) Nico Hülkenberg
9	R2	(Netherlands) Circuit Park Zandvoort	28 August	(Germany) Nico Hülkenberg	(Switzerland) Sébastien Buemi	(Switzerland) Sébastien Buemi	(Germany) Mücke Motorsport	(Germany) Nico Hülkenberg
10	R1	(Germany) Hockenheimring	22 October	(Germany) Nico Hülkenberg	(Germany) Nico Hülkenberg	(Finland) Markus Niemelä	(Germany) Team Rosberg	(Germany) Christian Vietoris
10	R2	(Germany) Hockenheimring	23 October	(Germany) Nico Hülkenberg	(Germany) Nico Hülkenberg	(Germany) Nico Hülkenberg	(Germany) Josef Kaufmann Racing	(Germany) Nico Hülkenberg

== Standings ==
- Points are awarded as follows:

1	2	3	4	5	6	7	8	9	10
20	15	12	10	8	6	4	3	2	1

Pos	Driver	HOC1 (Germany)		LAU (Germany)		SPA (Belgium)		NÜR1 (Germany)		BRN (Czech Republic)		OSC (Germany)		NOR (Germany)		NÜR2 (Germany)		ZAN (Netherlands)		HOC2 (Germany)		Pts
1	(Germany) Nico Hülkenberg	**1**	1	**2**	1	**4**	2	**1**	**2**	3	4	**1**	4	19†	1	3	4	1	**3**	**6**	**1**	287
2	(Switzerland) Sébastien Buemi	2	5	1	3	1	**Ret**	2	3	**2**	**1**	2	**1**	**5**	2	1	**1**	**2**	1	16	3	282
3	(Portugal) João Urbano	5	7	20†	4	16	5	10	1	1	3	3	2	3	Ret	6	17	3	2	15	Ret	155
4	(New Zealand) Chris van der Drift	3	3	9	17	3	1	6	6	5	2	4	5	7	Ret	4	12	19†	6	5	4	149
5	(Netherlands) Nick de Bruijn	6	Ret	4	**2**	8	Ret	DNS	16	9	6	5	3	Ret	**4**	8	3	4	5	18	7	109
6	(Switzerland) Natacha Gachnang	15	8	3	6	22	8	Ret	7	6	7	8	11	2	5	Ret	2	8	19	Ret	5	90
7	(Finland) Markus Niemelä	10	**Ret**	5	22†	6	Ret	8	9	8	5	6	6	17†	7	5	20	13	7	1	6	85
8	(Austria) Martin Ragginger	16	16	7	5	10	4	5	12	7	10	10	12	Ret	Ret	9	6	5	4	Ret	2	78
9	(Germany) Tim Sandtler	12	13	14	12	23	7	3	5	4	16	15	8	8	15	**2**	8	9	9	3	15	74
10	(United States) Jonathan Summerton	Ret	11	8	8	14	3	19	20	22	Ret	14	7	4	16†	7	5	7	10	9	Ret	51
11	(Italy) Fabio Onidi	8	9	11	7	7	Ret	4	4	19	13	21†	22	Ret	6	DNS	19	6	8			48
12	(Finland) Mika Mäki	Ret	19	10	9	15	Ret	12	11	13	9	7	13	1	3	Ret	11	10	12	Ret	9	44
13	(Germany) Marco Holzer	9	4	12	10	2	13	13	15	10	11	9	17	6	8	11	18	12	11	10	17†	41
14	(Mexico) Sergio Pérez	13	2	6	Ret	5	DNS	15	8	12	8	Ret	14	13	13	Ret	9	14	15	12	Ret	37
15	(Germany) Benjamin Leuchter	4	6	Ret	19	12	18	11	21													16
16	(Germany) Dominik Wasem	Ret	18	13	14	13	16	18	19	16	19	16	19	12	Ret	20	14	17	14	2	12	15
17	(Germany) Christian Vietoris	Ret	17	22	18	11	17	7	13	20	17	18	18	Ret	DNS	10	16	Ret	22	4	Ret	15
18	(Monaco) Stefano Coletti	7	14	21	11	9	6	14	Ret	11	12	22†	Ret	18†	Ret	15	Ret	11	Ret	Ret	10	13
19	(Netherlands) Marco Idili	18†	22	17	15	25	19†	9	14	18	14	13	9	20†	10	14	7	18	17	Ret	16†	9
20	(Germany) Tobias Hegewald	14	12	16	Ret	19	9	17	17	14	22	17	16	16	12	13	15	Ret	Ret	7	14	6
21	(Finland) Henri Karjalainen	Ret	10	19	16	17	12	Ret	10	15	15	12	15	14	14	19	Ret	15	18	8	11	5
22	(Germany) Marcel Jeleniowski																			11	8	3
23	(Germany) Johnny Cecotto Jr.	17	23	Ret	21	18	15	21	22	17	18	Ret	23	9	17†	16	10	Ret	20	DNS	DNS	3
24	(Germany) Jens Höing	DNS	21	Ret	20	24	11	20	Ret	Ret	24	Ret	20	11	9	18	Ret	Ret	16	17	DNS	2
25	(Lithuania) Andzej Dzikevic	11	20	15	Ret	21	10	Ret	18	21	21	11	10	15	11	17	13	20†	13	13	13	2
26	(Latvia) Harald Schlegelmilch	Ret	15	18	13	20	14	16	Ret	24	20	Ret	21	10	Ret	12	Ret					1
27	(Czech Republic) Jiri Micanek, Jr.	DNS	24†							23	23	19	24†	DNS	DNS	21	Ret	16	21	14	Ret	0
28	(Thailand) Robert Boughey											20	Ret									0
Pos	Driver	HOC1 (Germany)		LAU (Germany)		SPA (Belgium)		NÜR1 (Germany)		BRN (Czech Republic)		OSC (Germany)		NOR (Germany)		NÜR2 (Germany)		ZAN (Netherlands)		HOC2 (Germany)		Pts

Colour	Result
Gold	Winner
Silver	Second place
Bronze	Third place
Green	Points classification
Blue	Non-points classification
Blue	Non-classified finish (NC)
Purple	Retired, not classified (Ret)
Red	Did not qualify (DNQ)
Red	Did not pre-qualify (DNPQ)
Black	Disqualified (DSQ)
White	Did not start (DNS)
White	Withdrew (WD)
White	Race cancelled (C)
Blank	Did not practice (DNP)
Blank	Did not arrive (DNA)
Blank	Excluded (EX)

**Bold** – Pole
Italics – Fastest Lap

† — Drivers did not finish the race, but were classified as they completed over 90% of the race distance.

=== Rookie Cup ===
- Points are awarded as follows:

1	2	3	4	5	6	7	8	9	10
20	15	12	10	8	6	4	3	2	1

Pos	Driver	HOC1 (Germany)		LAU (Germany)		SPA (Belgium)		NÜR1 (Germany)		BRN (Czech Republic)		OSC (Germany)		NOR (Germany)		NÜR2 (Germany)		ZAN (Netherlands)		HOC2 (Germany)		Pts
1	(Germany) Nico Hülkenberg	**1**	1	**2**	1	**4**	2	**1**	**2**	3	4	**1**	4	19†	1	3	4	1	**3**	**6**	**1**	369
2	(Netherlands) Nick de Bruijn	6	Ret	4	**2**	8	Ret	DNS	16	9	6	5	3	Ret	**4**	8	3	4	5	18	7	215
3	(Austria) Martin Ragginger	16	16	7	5	10	4	5	12	7	10	10	12	Ret	Ret	9	6	5	4	Ret	2	193
4	(Finland) Mika Mäki	Ret	19	10	9	15	Ret	12	11	13	9	7	13	1	3	Ret	11	10	12	Ret	9	151
5	(Mexico) Sergio Pérez	13	2	6	Ret	5	DNS	15	8	12	8	Ret	14	13	13	Ret	9	14	15	12	Ret	143
6	(Monaco) Stefano Coletti	7	14	21	11	9	6	14	Ret	11	12	22†	Ret	18†	Ret	15	Ret	11	Ret	Ret	10	106
7	(Germany) Tobias Hegewald	14	12	16	Ret	19	9	17	17	14	22	17	16	16	12	13	15	Ret	Ret	7	14	102
8	(Netherlands) Marco Idili	18†	22	17	15	25	19†	9	14	18	14	13	9	20†	10	14	7	18	17	Ret	16†	99
9	(Germany) Christian Vietoris	Ret	17	22	18	11	17	7	13	20	17	18	18	Ret	DNS	10	16	Ret	22	4	Ret	87
10	(Germany) Jens Höing	DNS	21	Ret	20	24	11	20	Ret	Ret	24	Ret	20	11	9	18	Ret	Ret	16	17	DNS	57
11	(Germany) Johnny Cecotto Jr.	17	23	Ret	21	18	15	21	22	17	18	Ret	23	9	17†	16	10	Ret	20	DNS	DNS	55
Pos	Driver	HOC1 (Germany)		LAU (Germany)		SPA (Belgium)		NÜR1 (Germany)		BRN (Czech Republic)		OSC (Germany)		NOR (Germany)		NÜR2 (Germany)		ZAN (Netherlands)		HOC2 (Germany)		Pts

Colour	Result
Gold	Winner
Silver	Second place
Bronze	Third place
Green	Points classification
Blue	Non-points classification
Blue	Non-classified finish (NC)
Purple	Retired, not classified (Ret)
Red	Did not qualify (DNQ)
Red	Did not pre-qualify (DNPQ)
Black	Disqualified (DSQ)
White	Did not start (DNS)
White	Withdrew (WD)
White	Race cancelled (C)
Blank	Did not practice (DNP)
Blank	Did not arrive (DNA)
Blank	Excluded (EX)

**Bold** – Pole
Italics – Fastest Lap
