= Durango (racing team) =

Racing team

(Italy) Durango
- Founded: 1980
- Folded: 2016
- Team principal(s): Ivone Pinton; Enrico Magro
- Former series: Italian Formula Three Championship; International Formula 3000; 24 Hours of Le Mans; GP2 Series; GP2 Asia Series; Auto GP; Superleague Formula; World Series Formula V8 3.5
- Noted drivers: (Brazil) Lucas di Grassi (Brazil) Carlos Iaconelli (France) Yannick Schroeder (Brazil) Rodrigo Sperafico (Italy) Davide Valsecchi

Durango Automotive SRL was an Italian auto racing team founded in 1980 by Ivone Pinton and Enrico Magro, which competed in Formula 3000, the 24 Hours of Le Mans and the GP2 Series. The team finished racing after withdrawing from the Italian round of the 2009 GP2 Series season, although it was linked to Jacques Villeneuve and his bid to return to Formula One for the 2011 season.

== History ==
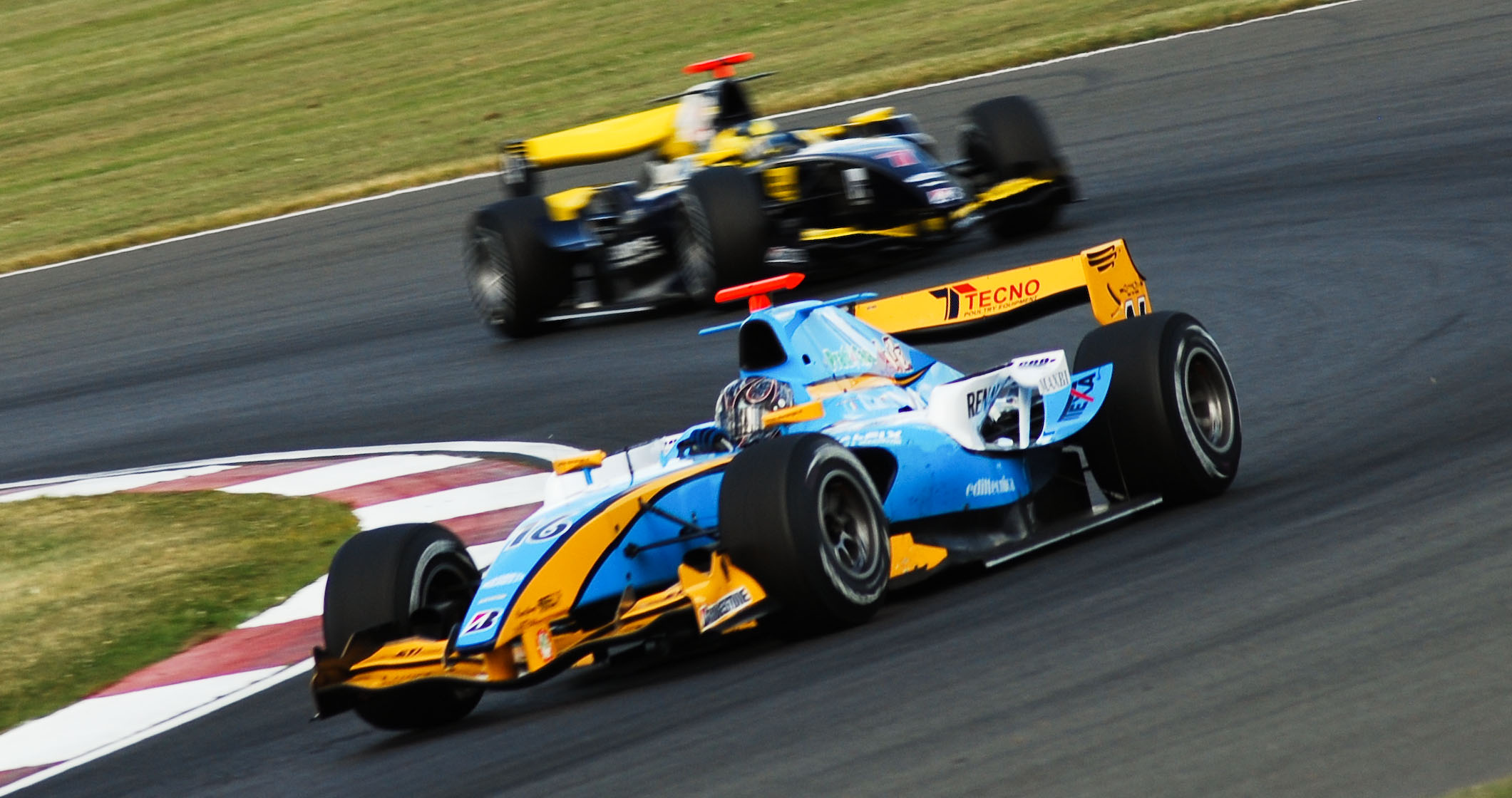
Davide Valsecchi driving for Durango at the Silverstone round of the 2008 GP2 Series season.

The Durango team took part in the Italian Formula Three Championship from 1987 to 1992. They expanded to compete in the International Formula 3000 Championship and the British Formula Two Championship in 1991, and entered a Lancia LC2 in the 1991 24 Hours of Le Mans, under the banner of Veneto Equipe. Durango took part in the Renault Formula Two championship and Euroseries in 1994 and continued to race in Formula Three until 1999.

In 2003, Durango designed and built a Le Mans Prototype car, the PM02, to compete in the FIA Sportscar championship and the Le Mans 24 Hours. The car was powered by a Judd GV4 V10 engine. The team participated for the 2nd time in the 24 Hours of Le Mans and finished in 24th position, after qualifying 18th. The car's best result was a 4th place at the Estoril round of the FIA sportscar championship. The car was never raced again after the 2003 season.

In 2005, Durango became part of the GP2 Series, a new series designed to help young drivers enter into Formula One. In 2006, the team participated in Formula Azzurra, a series supported by the Italian Karting Federation. Due to financial problems the team was forced to withdraw from the final races of the 2009 GP2 Series season, and pulled out of competing in the 2009-10 GP2 Asia Series season.

== Formula One entry bid ==
Durango attempted to enter Formula One in 2010, when the Fédération Internationale de l'Automobile opened an entry process for an additional thirteenth team. The team principal Ivone Pinton stated there were investors only interested with competing in F1, and announced a partnership with 1997 Formula One champion Jacques Villeneuve. The team would compete as Villeneuve Racing and Villeneuve would initially be one of the two drivers. The FIA did not accept any of the applications for the 2011 season.

== Results ==
=== GP2 Series ===
GP2 Series Results
Year	Car	Drivers	Races	Wins	Poles	FLaps	Points	D.C.	T.C.
2005	Dallara GP2/05-Mecachrome	(Monaco) Clivio Piccione	23	1	0	1	14	15th	11th
2005	Dallara GP2/05-Mecachrome	(Italy) Ferdinando Monfardini	17	0	0	0	5	17th	11th
2005	Dallara GP2/05-Mecachrome	(Italy) Gianmaria Bruni	4	0	1	0	35	10th	11th
2006	Dallara GP2/05-Mecachrome	(Brazil) Lucas di Grassi	21	0	0	1	8	18th	13th
2006	Dallara GP2/05-Mecachrome	(Spain) Sergio Hernández	21	0	0	0	1	23rd	13th
2007	Dallara GP2/05-Mecachrome	(Spain) Borja García	21	0	0	0	28	10th	8th
2007	Dallara GP2/05-Mecachrome	(India) Karun Chandhok	21	1	0	2	16	15th	8th
2008	Dallara GP2/08-Mecachrome	(Italy) Davide Valsecchi	16	1	0	0	11	15th	11th
2008	Dallara GP2/08-Mecachrome	(Italy) Marcello Puglisi	2	0	0	0	0	33rd	11th
2008	Dallara GP2/08-Mecachrome	(United Kingdom) Ben Hanley	2	0	0	0	0	24th	11th
2008	Dallara GP2/08-Mecachrome	(Brazil) Alberto Valerio	20	0	0	0	0	26th	11th
2009	Dallara GP2/08-Mecachrome	(Italy) Davide Valsecchi	12	0	0	0	10	17th†	11th
2009	Dallara GP2/08-Mecachrome	(Monaco) Stefano Coletti	4	0	0	0	0	25th	11th
2009	Dallara GP2/08-Mecachrome	(France) Nelson Panciatici	16	0	0	0	0	24th	11th

=== In detail ===
(key) (Races in bold indicate pole position) (Races in italics indicate fastest lap)

Year	Chassis Engine Tyres	Drivers	1	2	3	4	5	6	7	8	9	10	11	12	13	14	15	16	17	18	19	20	21	22	23	T.C.	Points
2005	GP2/05; Renault; **B**		SMR; FEA	SMR; SPR	CAT; FEA	CAT; SPR	MON; FEA	NÜR; FEA	NÜR; SPR	MAG; FEA	MAG; SPR	SIL; FEA	SIL; SPR	HOC; FEA	HOC; SPR	HUN; FEA	HUN; SPR	IST; FEA	IST; SPR	MNZ; FEA	MNZ; SPR	SPA; FEA	SPA; SPR	BHR; FEA	BHR; SPR	11th	21
2005	GP2/05; Renault; **B**	(Monaco) Clivio Piccione	15	Ret	Ret	8	Ret	7	1	8	DSQ	6	Ret	Ret	17	Ret	16	Ret	11	11	14	12	19	13	7	11th	21
2005	GP2/05; Renault; **B**	(Italy) Ferdinando Monfardini	Ret	DNS	Ret	11	DNS	Ret	6	12	17^{†}	14	10	Ret	15	Ret	11	Ret	Ret	8	4					11th	21
2005	GP2/05; Renault; **B**	(Italy) Gianmaria Bruni																				**Ret**	16	Ret	14	11th	21
2006	GP2/05; Renault; **B**		VAL; FEA	VAL; SPR	SMR; FEA	SMR; SPR	NÜR; FEA	NÜR; SPR	CAT; FEA	CAT; SPR	MON; FEA	SIL; FEA	SIL; SPR	MAG; FEA	MAG; SPR	HOC; FEA	HOC; SPR	HUN; FEA	HUN; SPR	IST; FEA	IST; SPR	MNZ; FEA	MNZ; SPR			13th	9
2006	GP2/05; Renault; **B**	(Brazil) Lucas di Grassi	17	16^{†}	Ret	Ret	18	13	12	9	11	Ret	EX	7	6	Ret	Ret	13	Ret	5	9	10	14			13th	9
2006	GP2/05; Renault; **B**	(Spain) Sergio Hernández	Ret	Ret	Ret	13	12	Ret	Ret	13	8	10	EX	14	11	10	Ret	Ret	Ret	11	10	13	Ret			13th	9
2007	GP2/05; Renault; **B**		BHR; FEA	BHR; SPR	CAT; FEA	CAT; SPR	MON; FEA	MAG; FEA	MAG; SPR	SIL; FEA	SIL; SPR	NÜR; FEA	NÜR; SPR	HUN; FEA	HUN; SPR	IST; FEA	IST; SPR	MNZ; FEA	MNZ; SPR	SPA; FEA	SPA; SPR	VAL; FEA	VAL; SPR			8th	44
2007	GP2/05; Renault; **B**	(Spain) Borja García	8	4	5	14	16^{†}	12	20^{†}	20^{†}	17	19	12	5	5	5	4	Ret	19	16	17	5	4			8th	44
2007	GP2/05; Renault; **B**	(India) Karun Chandhok	9	Ret	Ret	15	Ret	Ret	16	12	13	Ret	16	14	15^{†}	8	Ret	5	6	7	1	17	Ret			8th	44
2008	GP2/08; Renault; **B**		CAT; FEA	CAT; SPR	IST; FEA	IST; SPR	MON; FEA	MON; FEA	MAG; FEA	MAG; SPR	SIL; FEA	SIL; SPR	HOC; FEA	HOC; SPR	HUN; FEA	HUN; SPR	VAL; FEA	VAL; SPR	SPA; FEA	SPA; SPR	MNZ; FEA	MNZ; SPR				11th	11
2008	GP2/08; Renault; **B**	(Italy) Davide Valsecchi	10	5	DNS	DNS					19	6	Ret	13	Ret	13	NC	7	Ret	6	8	1				11th	11
2008	GP2/08; Renault; **B**	(Italy) Marcello Puglisi					17	19																		11th	11
2008	GP2/08; Renault; **B**	(United Kingdom) Ben Hanley							Ret	Ret																11th	11
2008	GP2/08; Renault; **B**	(Brazil) Alberto Valerio	13	Ret	18	7	Ret	Ret	18	17	21	9	9	15	DNS	17	Ret	12	Ret	Ret	12	15				11th	11
2009	GP2/08; Renault; **B**		CAT; FEA	CAT; SPR	MON; FEA	MON; FEA	IST; FEA	IST; SPR	SIL; FEA	SIL; SPR	NÜR; FEA	NÜR; SPR	HUN; FEA	HUN; SPR	VAL; FEA	VAL; SPR	SPA; FEA	SPA; SPR	MNZ; FEA	MNZ; SPR	ALG; FEA	ALG; SPR				11th	10
2009	GP2/08; Renault; **B**	(Italy) Davide Valsecchi	Ret	16	15^{†}	18	3	Ret	10	14	13	10	5	9												11th	10
2009	GP2/08; Renault; **B**	(Monaco) Stefano Coletti													Ret	Ret	12^{†}	DNS								11th	10
2009	GP2/08; Renault; **B**	(France) Nelson Panciatici	12	18	Ret	15	Ret	Ret	18	Ret	19^{†}	13	14	20	Ret	15	11	13								11th	10

=== GP2 Asia Series ===
(key) (Races in bold indicate pole position) (Races in italics indicate fastest lap)

Year	Chassis Engine Tyres	Drivers	1	2	3	4	5	6	7	8	9	10	11	12	T.C.	Points
2008	GP2/05; Renault; **B**		DUB1; FEA	DUB1; SPR	SEN; FEA	SEN; SPR	SEP; FEA	SEP; SPR	BHR; FEA	BHR; SPR	DUB2; FEA	DUB2; SPR			8th	19
2008	GP2/05; Renault; **B**	(Italy) Davide Valsecchi	17	6	Ret	19	4	4	6	6	14	4			8th	19
2008	GP2/05; Renault; **B**	(Brazil) Alberto Valerio	9	5	Ret	Ret	Ret	17	DNS	17	13	15			8th	19
2008–09	GP2/05; Renault; **B**		SHI; FEA	SHI; SPR	DUB3; FEA	DUB3; SPR	BHR1; FEA	BHR1; SPR	LSL; FEA	LSL; SPR	SEP; FEA	SEP; SPR	BHR2; FEA	BHR2; SPR	5th	34
2008–09	GP2/05; Renault; **B**	(Italy) Davide Valsecchi	8	1	2	C	5	2	6	5	8	3	16	Ret	5th	34
2008–09	GP2/05; Renault; **B**	(Brazil) Carlos Iaconelli	11	Ret											5th	34
2008–09	GP2/05; Renault; **B**	(Italy) Michael Dalle Stelle			17	C	19	20	20	22	18	20	Ret	19	5th	34

=== Formula 3000 ===
International Formula 3000 Championship Results
Year	Car	Drivers	Races	Wins	Poles	FLaps	Points	D.C.	T.C.
2001	Lola B99/50-Zytek	(Italy) Gabriele Lancieri	12	0	0	0	0	NC	10th
2001	Lola B99/50-Zytek	(Brazil) Jaime Melo	9	0	1	0	8	12th	10th
2001	Lola B99/50-Zytek	(Spain) Antonio García†	3	0	0	0	0	NC	10th
2002	Lola B02/50-Zytek	(Germany) Alex Müller†	5	0	0	0	0	NC	6th
2002	Lola B02/50-Zytek	(United States) Derek Hill	7	0	0	0	0	NC	6th
2002	Lola B02/50-Zytek	(Brazil) Rodrigo Sperafico	12	1	0	0	20	6th	6th
2003	Lola B02/50-Zytek	(Italy) Giorgio Pantano	10	2	2	2	41	3rd	3rd
2003	Lola B02/50-Zytek	(Italy) Raffaele Giammaria	10	0	0	0	14	10th	3rd
2004	Lola B02/50-Zytek	(France) Yannick Schroeder	8	0	0	0	13	9th	7th
2004	Lola B02/50-Zytek	(Italy) Matteo Meneghello	1	0	0	0	0	NC	7th
2004	Lola B02/50-Zytek	(Italy) Michele Rugolo	1	0	0	0	0	NC	7th
2004	Lola B02/50-Zytek	(Brazil) Rodrigo Ribeiro	4	0	0	0	1	17th	7th
2004	Lola B02/50-Zytek	(Venezuela) Ernesto Viso	6	0	0	0	7	12th	7th

=== In detail ===
(key) (Races in bold indicate pole position; races in italics indicate fastest lap)

Year	Chassis	Engine	Tyres	Driver	1	2	3	4	5	6	7	8	9	10	11	12	TC	Points
2001	Lola B99/50	Zytek	A		INT	IMO	CAT	A1R	MON	NÜR	MAG	SIL	HOC	HUN	SPA	MNZ	10th	8
2001	Lola B99/50	Zytek	A	(Italy) Gabriele Lancieri	Ret	13	Ret	12	Ret	14	13	10	9	9	14	Ret	10th	8
2001	Lola B99/50	Zytek	A	(Brazil) Jaime Melo	**2**	Ret	21	5	11	13	14	12	12				10th	8
2001	Lola B99/50	Zytek	A	(Spain) Antonio García										10	16	11	10th	8
2002	Lola B02/50	Zytek	A		INT	IMO	CAT	A1R	MON	NÜR	SIL	MAG	HOC	HUN	SPA	MNZ	6th	20
2002	Lola B02/50	Zytek	A	(Germany) Alex Müller	11	Ret	Ret	13	DSQ								6th	20
2002	Lola B02/50	Zytek	A	(United States) Derek Hill						7	Ret	Ret	9	Ret	7	Ret	6th	20
2002	Lola B02/50	Zytek	A	(Brazil) Rodrigo Sperafico	1	2	7	12	Ret	8	9	8	3	Ret	12	8	6th	20
2003	Lola B02/50	Zytek	A		IMO	CAT	A1R	MON	NÜR	MAG	SIL	HOC	HUN	MNZ			3rd	55
2003	Lola B02/50	Zytek	A	(Italy) Giorgio Pantano	Ret	**1**	3	Ret	16	**1**	2	7	4	Ret			3rd	55
2003	Lola B02/50	Zytek	A	(Italy) Raffaele Giammaria	7	Ret	14	3	7	8	Ret	10	6	Ret			3rd	55
2004	Lola B02/50	Zytek	A		IMO	CAT	MON	NÜR	MAG	SIL	HOC	HUN	SPA	MNZ			7th	21
2004	Lola B02/50	Zytek	A	(France) Yannick Schroeder	7	Ret	10	3	4	14	Ret	Ret					7th	21
2004	Lola B02/50	Zytek	A	(Italy) Matteo Meneghello									15				7th	21
2004	Lola B02/50	Zytek	A	(Italy) Michele Rugolo										Ret			7th	21
2004	Lola B02/50	Zytek	A	(Brazil) Rodrigo Ribeiro	13	8	Ret	16									7th	21
2004	Lola B02/50	Zytek	A	(Venezuela) Ernesto Viso					8	11	7	6	10	8			7th	21

=== Sports car ===
24 Hours of Le Mans results
Year	Class	No	Tyres	Car	Drivers	Pole	Fast lap	Laps	Pos.	Class Pos.
2003	LMP900	19	**D**	Durango LMP1; Judd GV4 4.0L V10	(France) Sylvain Boulay (Italy) Michele Rugolo (France) Jean-Bernard Bouvet	no	no	277	25th	9th

Series	Year	Drivers	Car	Notes
Italian Formula 3000	2005		Lola-Zytek	As technical part of Fisichella Motor Sport
Euroseries 3000	2006		Lola-Zytek	As technical part of Fisichella Motor Sport
Euroseries 3000	2007	Omar Julian Leal, Luiz Razia	Lola-Zytek	

== Other Series History ==
Series	Year	Drivers	Car	Notes
European Formula Renault 2000	2002			
European Formula Renault 2000	2003			
Italian Formula Renault 2000	2004			
Italian Formula Renault 2000	2006			
Italian Formula Azzurra	2006			
Endurance GT Series	2007	Niccolò Valentini, Enrico Moncada, Matteo Meneghello	Porsche 911 GT3	
