= 2007 Valencia GP2 Series round =

(Spain) 2007 Valencia GP2 round
Round details
- Round 11 of 11 rounds in the 2007 GP2 Series
- Layout of the Circuit Ricardo Tormo
- Location: Circuit Ricardo Tormo, Valencia, Spain
- Course: Permanent road course 4.005 km (2.517 mi)

GP2 Series

Feature race
- Date: 29 September 2007
- Laps: 45

Pole position
| Driver | (Japan) Kazuki Nakajima | DAMS |
- Time: 1:19.312

Podium
| First | (Russia) Vitaly Petrov | Campos Grand Prix |
| Second | (Italy) Giorgio Pantano | Campos Grand Prix |
| Third | (Japan) Kazuki Nakajima | DAMS |

Fastest lap
| Driver | (India) Karun Chandhok | Durango |
- Time: 1:22.336 (on lap 42)

Sprint race
- Date: 30 September 2007
- Laps: 29

Podium
| First | (Germany) Timo Glock | iSport International |
| Second | (Spain) Javier Villa | Racing Engineering |
| Third | (Spain) Andy Soucek | David Price Racing |

Fastest lap
| Driver | (Germany) Timo Glock | iSport International |
- Time: 1:22.313 (on lap 4)

2007 Valencia GP2 Series round was the final round of the 2007 GP2 Series season. It was held on 29 September and 30, 2007 at the Circuit Ricardo Tormo in Valencia.

== Classification ==
=== Qualifying ===
| Pos. | No. | Driver | Team | Time | Grid |
|---|---|---|---|---|---|
| 1 | 22 | (Japan) Kazuki Nakajima | DAMS | 1:19.312 | 1 |
| 2 | 5 | (Germany) Timo Glock | iSport International | 1:19.389 | 2 |
| 3 | 16 | (Italy) Luca Filippi | Super Nova Racing | 1:19.427 | 3 |
| 4 | 23 | (France) Nicolas Lapierre | DAMS | 1:19.643 | 4 |
| 5 | 3 | (Brazil) Alexandre Negrão | Minardi Piquet Sports | 1:19.647 | 5 |
| 6 | 4 | (Spain) Roldán Rodríguez | Minardi Piquet Sports | 1:19.665 | 6 |
| 7 | 2 | (Brazil) Lucas di Grassi | ART Grand Prix | 1:19.669 | 7 |
| 8 | 24 | (Russia) Vitaly Petrov | Campos Grand Prix | 1:19.785 | 8 |
| 9 | 12 | (Japan) Kohei Hirate | Trident Racing | 1:19.895 | 9 |
| 10 | 25 | (Italy) Giorgio Pantano | Campos Grand Prix | 1:19.912 | 10 |
| 11 | 9 | (United Kingdom) Adam Carroll | Petrol Ofisi FMS International | 1:19.959 | 11 |
| 12 | 17 | (United Kingdom) Mike Conway | Super Nova Racing | 1:19.971 | 12 |
| 13 | 27 | (India) Karun Chandhok | Durango | 1:19.972 | 13 |
| 14 | 6 | (United Arab Emirates) Andreas Zuber | iSport International | 1:20.056 | 14 |
| 15 | 21 | (Spain) Andy Soucek | David Price Racing | 1:20.172 | 15 |
| 16 | 14 | (Spain) Javier Villa | Racing Engineering | 1:20.354 | 16 |
| 17 | 26 | (Spain) Borja García | Durango | 1:20.381 | 17 |
| 18 | 7 | (Brazil) Bruno Senna | Arden International | 1:20.430 | 18 |
| 19 | 15 | (Spain) Marcos Martínez | Racing Engineering | 1:20.616 | 19 |
| 20 | 11 | (Spain) Sergio Hernández | Trident Racing | 1:20.700 | 20 |
| 21 | 19 | (China) Ho-Pin Tung | BCN Competición | 1:20.780 | 21 |
| 22 | 10 | (Turkey) Jason Tahincioglu | Petrol Ofisi FMS International | 1:21.025 | 22 |
| 23 | 1 | (Russia) Mikhail Aleshin | ART Grand Prix | 1:21.089 | 23 |
| 24 | 18 | (Finland) Markus Niemelä | BCN Competición | 1:21.263 | 24 |
| 25 | 8 | (Portugal) Filipe Albuquerque | Arden International | 1:21.281 | 25 |
| 26 | 20 | (Denmark) Christian Bakkerud | David Price Racing | 1:21.348 | 26 |

=== Feature race ===
| Pos. | No. | Driver | Team | Laps | Time/Retired | Grid | Points |
|---|---|---|---|---|---|---|---|
| 1 | 24 | (Russia) Vitaly Petrov | Campos Grand Prix | 45 | 1:05:20.497 | 8 | 10 |
| 2 | 25 | (Italy) Giorgio Pantano | Campos Grand Prix | 45 | +2.495 | 10 | 8 |
| 3 | 22 | (Japan) Kazuki Nakajima | DAMS | 45 | +2.541 | 1 | 6+2 |
| 4 | 15 | (Spain) Marcos Martínez | Racing Engineering | 45 | +51.658 | 19 | 5 |
| 5 | 26 | (Spain) Borja García | Durango | 45 | +1:20.832 | 17 | 4 |
| 6 | 21 | (Spain) Andy Soucek | David Price Racing | 44 | +1 lap | 15 | 3 |
| 7 | 5 | (Germany) Timo Glock | iSport International | 44 | +1 lap | 2 | 2 |
| 8 | 14 | (Spain) Javier Villa | Racing Engineering | 44 | +1 lap | 16 | 1 |
| 9 | 1 | (Russia) Mikhail Aleshin | ART Grand Prix | 44 | +1 lap | 23 | |
| 10 | 8 | (Portugal) Filipe Albuquerque | Arden International | 44 | +1 lap | 25 | |
| 11 | 19 | (China) Ho-Pin Tung | BCN Competición | 44 | +1 lap | 21 | |
| 12 | 6 | (United Arab Emirates) Andreas Zuber | iSport International | 44 | +1 lap | 14 | |
| 13 | 10 | (Turkey) Jason Tahincioglu | Petrol Ofisi FMS International | 44 | +1 lap | 22 | |
| 14 | 18 | (Finland) Markus Niemelä | BCN Competición | 44 | +1 lap | 24 | |
| 15 | 3 | (Brazil) Alexandre Negrão | Minardi Piquet Sports | 44 | +1 lap | 5 | |
| 16 | 17 | (United Kingdom) Mike Conway | Super Nova Racing | 43 | +2 laps | 12 | |
| 17 | 27 | (India) Karun Chandhok | Durango | 43 | +2 laps | 13 | 1 |
| 18 | 16 | (Italy) Luca Filippi | Super Nova Racing | 40 | Did not finish | 3 | |
| Ret | 7 | (Brazil) Bruno Senna | Arden International | 23 | Did not finish | 18 | |
| Ret | 11 | (Spain) Sergio Hernández | Trident Racing | 16 | Did not finish | 20 | |
| Ret | 9 | (United Kingdom) Adam Carroll | Petrol Ofisi FMS International | 8 | Did not finish | 11 | |
| Ret | 12 | (Japan) Kohei Hirate | Trident Racing | 7 | Did not finish | 9 | |
| Ret | 2 | (Brazil) Lucas di Grassi | ART Grand Prix | 5 | Did not finish | 7 | |
| Ret | 4 | (Spain) Roldán Rodríguez | Minardi Piquet Sports | 4 | Did not finish | 6 | |
| Ret | 20 | (Denmark) Christian Bakkerud | David Price Racing | 3 | Did not finish | 26 | |
| Ret | 23 | (France) Nicolas Lapierre | DAMS | 0 | Did not finish | 4 | |

=== Sprint race ===
| Pos. | No. | Driver | Team | Laps | Time/Retired | Grid | Points |
|---|---|---|---|---|---|---|---|
| 1 | 5 | (Germany) Timo Glock | iSport International | 29 | 40:29.814 | 2 | 6+1 |
| 2 | 14 | (Spain) Javier Villa | Racing Engineering | 29 | +5.474 | 1 | 5 |
| 3 | 21 | (Spain) Andy Soucek | David Price Racing | 29 | +7.099 | 3 | 4 |
| 4 | 26 | (Spain) Borja García | Durango | 29 | +7.630 | 4 | 3 |
| 5 | 25 | (Italy) Giorgio Pantano | Campos Grand Prix | 29 | +16.595 | 7 | 2 |
| 6 | 16 | (Italy) Luca Filippi | Super Nova Racing | 29 | +18.333 | 18 | 1 |
| 7 | 22 | (Japan) Kazuki Nakajima | DAMS | 29 | +18.565 | 6 | |
| 8 | 24 | (Russia) Vitaly Petrov | Campos Grand Prix | 29 | +19.868 | 8 | |
| 9 | 17 | (United Kingdom) Mike Conway | Super Nova Racing | 29 | +22.933 | 16 | |
| 10 | 8 | (Portugal) Filipe Albuquerque | Arden International | 29 | +24.896 | 10 | |
| 11 | 19 | (China) Ho-Pin Tung | BCN Competición | 29 | +30.748 | 11 | |
| 12 | 6 | (United Arab Emirates) Andreas Zuber | iSport International | 29 | +31.507 | 12 | |
| 13 | 2 | (Brazil) Lucas di Grassi | ART Grand Prix | 29 | +32.205 | 23 | |
| 14 | 7 | (Brazil) Bruno Senna | Arden International | 29 | +32.392 | 19 | |
| 15 | 9 | (United Kingdom) Adam Carroll | Petrol Ofisi FMS International | 29 | +43.618 | 21 | |
| 16 | 12 | (Japan) Kohei Hirate | Trident Racing | 29 | +44.775 | 22 | |
| 17 | 4 | (Spain) Roldán Rodríguez | Minardi Piquet Sports | 29 | +46.279 | 24 | |
| 18 | 3 | (Brazil) Alexandre Negrão | Minardi Piquet Sports | 29 | +52.033 | 15 | |
| 19 | 11 | (Spain) Sergio Hernández | Trident Racing | 29 | +52.612 | 20 | |
| 20 | 1 | (Russia) Mikhail Aleshin | ART Grand Prix | 29 | +53.348 | 9 | |
| 21 | 23 | (France) Nicolas Lapierre | DAMS | 29 | +1:10.578 | 26 | |
| 22 | 15 | (Spain) Marcos Martínez | Racing Engineering | 27 | +2 laps | 5 | |
| Ret | 18 | (Finland) Markus Niemelä | BCN Competición | 20 | Did not finish | 14 | |
| Ret | 27 | (India) Karun Chandhok | Durango | 20 | Did not finish | 17 | |
| Ret | 20 | (Denmark) Christian Bakkerud | David Price Racing | 9 | Did not finish | 25 | |
| Ret | 10 | (Turkey) Jason Tahincioglu | Petrol Ofisi FMS International | 0 | Did not finish | 13 | |

| Previous round: 2007 Spa-Francorchamps GP2 Series round | GP2 Series; 2007 season | Next round: 2008 Catalunya GP2 Series round |
| Previous round: 2006 Valencia GP2 Series round | 2007 Valencia GP2 Series round | Next round: 2008 Valencia GP2 Series round |
