= Matteo Meneghello =

Italian racing driver (born 1981)

- Nationality: (Italy) Italian
- Born: Abano Terme, Padua, Italy

Previous series
- 2015; 2010; 2005-2006; 2004; 2004; 2004; 2004; 2003; 2002; 2001: V de V Challenge Endurance Proto; Superstars Series; Formula Renault 3.5 Series; Rolex Sports Car Series; Euro Formula 3000 Series; International Formula 3000; Formula Renault V6 Eurocup; Formula Renault 2.0 UK; Formula Renault 2.0 Italia; Italian Formula Three Championship

Matteo Meneghello (born 8 June 1981 in Abano Terme) is an Italian former racing driver.

== Career ==
Former kart rival of Fernando Alonso, Matteo competed in karting championships from 1991 to 2000. He led the final start of the World Championship in 1995, and he was second at the finish line in front of Alonso and behind André Lotterer. After karting, Meneghello competed in the Italian Formula Renault Elf Campus. Then he moved to the Italian Formula 3 Federale in 2001. He moved to the Formula Renault 2000 Italy in 2002 with a fifth-place best result in the Pergusa GP for 2003. In 2004, he moved up to the Formula Renault V6 Eurocup.

Meneghello also competed in one race in both the Euro and FIA Formula 3000 series in 2004, but was limited to only one race in each.

Meneghello competed in the Formula Renault 3.5 Series in the 2005 half Championship and 2006 for four races. He was sixth in Monza at the last race.

In 2007, Meneghello moved up to GT in a Peroni race with a Dodge Viper in couple With Andrea Pellizzato.

In 2008 and 2009, Meneghello took part in a few races of the Italian GT Championship with two podiums (third position) like best results with a Porsche Gt3 cup in couple With gentleman driver Riccardo Bianco.

In 2010, Meneghello made his only race in the Superstars International Series with a Jaguar XF at the Hockenheimring. He was in eighth position during the first race, but an engine problem stopped his race before the end. He was limited to only one race.

In 2015, Meneghello drove a Tatuus Mugen in the VdeV series with gentleman driver Vito Rinaldi

== Racing record ==
=== Career summary ===
Season	Series	Team	Races	Wins	Poles	F.Laps	Podiums	Points	Position
2001	Italian Formula Three Championship - Federal Class	Drumel Motorsport	5	4	0	?	5	13	**1st**
2002	Formula Renault 2.0 Italia	Drumel Motorsport	10	0	0	0	0	42	11th
2003	Formula Renault 2.0 UK	Motaworld Racing	13	0	0	0	0	121	14th
2004	Formula Renault V6 Eurocup	AFC Motorsport	15	0	0	0	0	6	22nd
2004	International Formula 3000	Durango Corse	1	0	0	0	0	0	NC
2004	Euro Formula 3000 Series	Traini Corse	1	0	0	0	0	0	NC
2004	Rolex Sports Car Series	Mastercar	1	0	0	0	0	16	106th
2005	Formula Renault 3.5 Series	EuroInternational	12	0	0	0	0	3	27th
2006	Formula Renault 3.5 Series	GD Racing	8	0	0	0	0	0	NC
2010	Superstars Series	Ferlito Motors	1	0	0	0	0	0	NC
2015	V de V Challenge Endurance Proto - Scratch	Scuderia Bi & Bi	4	0	0	0	0	3	39th

=== Complete International Formula 3000 results ===
(key) (Races in bold indicate pole position; races in italics indicate fastest lap.)

Year	Entrant	1	2	3	4	5	6	7	8	9	10	DC	Points
2004	Durango Corse	IMO	CAT	MON	NUR	MAG	SIL	HOC	HUN	SPA; 15	MNZ	NC	0

=== Complete Formula Renault 3.5 Series results ===
(key) (Races in bold indicate pole position) (Races in italics indicate fastest lap)

Year	Entrant	1	2	3	4	5	6	7	8	9	10	11	12	13	14	15	16	17	DC	Points
2005	EuroInternational	ZOL; 1 NC	ZOL; 2; 13†	MON; 1 DNS	VAL; 1	VAL; 2	LMS; 1	LMS; 2	BIL; 1; 16	BIL; 2; 17	OSC; 1 Ret	OSC; 2; 13	DON; 1; 12	DON; 2; 16	EST; 1; 20	EST; 2; 14	MNZ; 1 Ret	MNZ; 2; 8	27th	3
2006	GD Racing	ZOL; 1; 16	ZOL; 2 DNQ	MON; 1; 18	IST; 1; 18	IST; 2; 11	MIS; 1; 18	MIS; 2; 20	SPA; 1; 17	SPA; 2; 18	NÜR; 1	NÜR; 2	DON; 1	DON; 2	LMS; 1	LMS; 2	CAT; 1	CAT; 2	35th	0

^{†} Driver did not finish the race, but was classified as he completed more than 90% of the race distance.
