= Markus Niemelä =

Finnish racing driver (born 1984)

- Nationality: (Finland) Finnish
- Born: Markus Samuli Niemelä; March 20, 1984 (age 42) Rauma, Finland

Atlantic Championship career
- Debut season: 2008
- Current team: Jensen MotorSport
- Car number: 1
- Former teams: Brooks Associates; Newman Wachs Racing
- Starts: 24
- Wins: 2
- Poles: 1
- Fastest laps: 0
- Best finish: 1st in 2008 Atlantic Championship season

Championship titles
- 1998 2002 2004 2004 2004 2008: Finland Junior Champion; Formula A Finland Champion; Formula Ford STCC Champion; Formula Ford Sweden Champion; Formula Ford Finland Champion; Champ Car Atlantic Champion

Markus Samuli Niemelä (born 20 March 1984 in Rauma) is a Finnish former race car driver. He was the 2008 series champion after winning the final round at Road Atlanta. His international racing career has been volatile due to a number of injuries he has sustained during his career.

== Career ==
=== Karting ===
In 1998, Niemelä won the Finnish junior karting championship with maximum points. In 2001, injury of left arm in a snowboarding accident before the start of season prevented participation in the Formula A European/World Championship. He won the one race where he participated, driving practically one-handed against top Finnish karters (ICA).

The following year, Niemelä was the Finnish champion in Formula A. He set the fastest laptime in at least one heat of every European Championship round. He also qualified in World Cup final but technical problems caused a retirement in pre-final and final. In 2003, because of an accident in a European championship race, Niemelä could not drive for three months. He returned for the World Championships to finish fifth.

=== Single-seaters ===
==== 2004 ====
Niemelä became the Finnish and Swedish Champion and the winner of STCC Formula Ford championship. He led Scandinavian Championship before the last round but finished second overall because he did not participate on the last round. Niemelä was nominated as a ”Young Champion” by Finnish ASN, and tested for Formula BMW and was fastest at several unofficial tests.

==== 2005 ====
Niemelä finished seventh in championship points with one victory and one pole position. Many crashes resulting to damaged car during the season (12 out of 20 races). He was also fifth in UK Formula Renault Winter Championship, third best qualifier of the championship (third, fourth, ninth and third in qualifyings). Niemelä drove Formula Renault first time ever in free practice of first race meeting.

==== 2006 ====
Niemelä had pne victory, one fastest lap and one pole position. He earned Multiple Driver Of The Day Awards - awarded by Renault Sport, and finished seventh in the final standings with best positions first, second, third, and twice fourth.

==== 2007 ====
In Formula Renault Eurocup, Niemelä did six starts with best result of second at Hungaroring, while in the Asian series, he did four starts with two wins and one second place. His third win of the four races was later penalized from jumping the start. He joined BCN Competicion in the GP2 Series to replace Sakon Yamamoto who moved to F1 during the season. During his first race, also at the Hungaroring, he was forced to retire when his left shoulder unexpectedly dislocated after 11 laps, which also prevented him from taking part in the second race of the meeting.

==== 2008 ====
In the 2008 season, Niemelä won the Atlantic Championship with Brooks Associates team, after winning the last two rounds of the season.

==== 2009 ====
Niemelä returned to the series to defend his Atlantic Championship title, this time driving for Newman Wachs Racing. He struggled through the first five races failing to score a podium finish. He switched teams to Jensen MotorSport for the remainder of the season, but failed to find any more success and finished sixth in points.

==== 2010 ====
Niemelä started racing Sprint Cars on dirt ovals. The best result of his depute season was second in a VRA race at Ventura Raceway.

==== 2011 ====
Niemelä raced in selected races in different Sprint Car Championships (USAC West Coast, USAC CRA, VRA, USAC Midget) with an average A Main finish of 4.5 over the season. He also scored his first Sprint Car win.

==== 2014 ====
In November 2014, Niemelä suffered a severe accident at Perris Auto Speedway in a sprint car, flipping end over end into the catch fence after an axle broke on his car. While he initially was believed to have suffered only a concussion, he later revealed he had suffered severe brain injuries in the accident, resulting in the end of his career.

== Racing record ==
=== Career summary ===
Season	Series	Team	Races	Wins	Poles	F/Laps	Points	Position
2004	Formula Ford Zetec Finland	Team Söderman	2	1	2	2	119	**1st**
2004	Formula Ford Zetec Sweden	Team Söderman	?	?	?	?	106	**1st**
2004	Formula Ford Zetec Nordic	Team Söderman	10	3	0	?	115	**2nd**
2005	Formula BMW ADAC	Team Rosberg	20	1	1	0	85	7th
2005	Formula Renault 2.0 UK Winter Series	Manor Motorsport	3	0	0	0	61	6th
2006	Formula Renault 2.0 UK	Mark Burdett Motorsport	20	1	1	1	274	7th
2007	Formula Renault 2.0 Eurocup	BVM Minardi Team	6	0	0	0	20	16th
2007	Asian Formula Renault Challenge	March 3 Racing	4	2	1	1	87	11th
2007	GP2 Series	BCN Competición	7	0	0	0	0	31st
2008	Atlantic Championship	Brooks Associates Racing	11	2	1	0	245	**1st**
2009	Atlantic Championship	Newman Wachs Racing	12	0	0	1	98	6th
2010	AMSOil USAC National Sprint Car Series	Kruseman Motorsport	3	0	0	0	0	-
2012	NASCAR K&N Pro Series West	Bill McAnally Racing	1	0	0	0	29	69th

=== Complete Formula BMW ADAC results ===
(key) (Races in bold indicate pole position) (Races in italics indicate fastest lap)

Year	Entrant	1	2	3	4	5	6	7	8	9	10	11	12	13	14	15	16	17	18	19	20	DC	Points
2005	Team Rosberg	HOC1; 1; 10	**HOC1**; **2** Ret	LAU; 1; 5	LAU; 2; 22†	SPA; 1; 6	SPA; 2 Ret	NÜR1; 1; 8	NÜR1; 2; 9	BRN; 1; 8	BRN; 2; 5	OSC; 1; 6	OSC; 2; 6	NOR; 1; 17†	NOR; 2; 7	NÜR2; 1; 5	NÜR2; 2; 20	ZAN; 1; 13	ZAN; 2; 7	HOC2; 1; 1	HOC2; 2; 6	7th	85

=== Complete Formula Renault 2.0 UK Championship results ===
(key) (Races in bold indicate pole position) (Races in italics indicate fastest lap)

Year	Entrant	1	2	3	4	5	6	7	8	9	10	11	12	13	14	15	16	17	18	19	20	DC	Points
2006	Mark Burdett Motorsport	BHI; 1; 17	BHI; 2; 10	**OUL**; **1**; 1	OUL; 2; 13	THR; 1 Ret	THR; 2; 19	KNO; 1; 3	KNO; 2; 8	CRO; 1; 6	CRO; 2; 16	DON; 1; 9	DON; 2; 10	SNE; 1; 4	SNE; 2; 9	DGP; 1; 4	DGP; 2; 6	BHI; 1; 2	BHI; 2; 8	SIL; 1; 8	SIL; 2 Ret	7th	274

=== Complete Eurocup Formula Renault 2.0 results ===
(key) (Races in bold indicate pole position; races in italics indicate fastest lap)

Year	Entrant	1	2	3	4	5	6	7	8	9	10	11	12	13	14	DC	Points
2007	BVM Minardi Team	ZOL; 1; 5	ZOL; 2; 9	NÜR; 1; 23	NÜR; 2 Ret	HUN; 1 Ret	HUN; 2; 2	DON; 1	DON; 2	MAG; 1	MAG; 2	EST; 1	EST; 2	CAT; 1	CAT; 2	16th	20

=== Complete Asian Formula Renault Challenge results ===
(key) (Races in bold indicate pole position; races in italics indicate fastest lap)

Year	Entrant	1	2	3	4	5	6	7	8	9	10	11	12	13	14	DC	Points
2007	March 3 Racing	ZHU; 1; 2	ZHU; 2; 14	SEP; 1; 1	SEP; 2; 1	BEI; 1	BEI; 2	SHA; 1	SHA; 2	ZHU; 1	ZHU; 2	BEI; 1	BEI; 2	SHA; 1	SHA; 2	11th	87

=== Complete GP2 Series results ===
(key) (Races in bold indicate pole position) (Races in italics indicate fastest lap)

Year	Entrant	1	2	3	4	5	6	7	8	9	10	11	12	13	14	15	16	17	18	19	20	21	DC	Points
2007	BCN Competición	BHR; FEA	BHR; SPR	CAT; FEA	CAT; SPR	MON; FEA	MAG; FEA	MAG; SPR	SIL; FEA	SIL; SPR	NÜR; FEA	NÜR; SPR	HUN; FEA; Ret	HUN; SPR; DNS	IST; FEA	IST; SPR	MNZ; FEA; 9	MNZ; SPR; 11	SPA; FEA; 11	SPA; SPR; Ret	VAL; FEA; 14	VAL; SPR; Ret	31st	0

=== American open–wheel racing results ===
(key) (Races in bold indicate pole position) (Races in italics indicate fastest lap)

==== Atlantic Championship ====
Year	Team	1	2	3	4	5	6	7	8	9	10	11	12	Rank	Points
2008	Brooks Associates Racing	LBH; 7	LS; 4	MTT; 2	EDM1; 2	EDM2; 6	ROA1; 6	ROA2; 6	TRR; Ret	NJ; 2	**UTA**; 1	ATL; 1		**1st**	**245**
2009	Newman Wachs Racing	SEB; Ret	UTA; Ret	NJ1; 4	NJ2; 4									**6th**	**98**
2009	Jensen MotorSport					LIM; 9	ACC1; Ret	ACC2; 6	MOH; 4	TRR; 5	MOS; 5	ATL; 5	LS; 5	**6th**	**98**

Sporting positions
Preceded by Raphael Matos	Formula Atlantic Champion; 2008	Succeeded by John Edwards
