= 2007 Spa-Francorchamps GP2 Series round =

(Belgium) 2007 Belgian GP2 round
Round details
- Round 10 of 11 rounds in the 2007 GP2 Series
- Circuit de Spa-Francorchamps
- Location: Circuit de Spa-Francorchamps, Francorchamps, Wallonia, Belgium
- Course: Permanent racing facility 7.004 km (4.352 mi)

GP2 Series

Feature race
- Date: 15 September 2007
- Laps: 26

Pole position
Driver	(France) Nicolas Lapierre	DAMS
- Time: 1:56.885

Podium
First	(France) Nicolas Lapierre	DAMS
Second	(Italy) Luca Filippi	Super Nova Racing
Third	(Brazil) Lucas di Grassi	ART Grand Prix

Fastest lap
Driver	(Germany) Timo Glock	iSport International
- Time: 1:58.572 (on lap 24)

Sprint race
- Date: 16 September 2007
- Laps: 18

Podium
First	(India) Karun Chandhok	Durango
Second	(Spain) Andy Soucek	David Price Racing
Third	(Brazil) Lucas di Grassi	ART Grand Prix

Fastest lap
Driver	(France) Nicolas Lapierre	DAMS
- Time: 1:58.748 (on lap 18)

2007 Spa-Francorchamps GP2 Series round was the tenth and penultimate race of the 2007 GP2 Series season. It was held on 15 September and 16, 2007 at Circuit de Spa-Francorchamps near the village of Francorchamps, Wallonia, Belgium. The race was used as a support race to the 2007 Belgian Grand Prix.

== Classification ==
=== Qualifying ===
Pos.	No.	Driver	Team	Time	Grid
1	23	(France) Nicolas Lapierre	DAMS	1:56.885	1
2	16	(Italy) Luca Filippi	Super Nova Racing	1:56.896	2
3	7	(Brazil) Bruno Senna	Arden International	1:57.106	3
4	2	(Brazil) Lucas di Grassi	ART Grand Prix	1:57.132	4
5	6	(United Arab Emirates) Andreas Zuber	iSport International	1:57.221	5
6	5	(Germany) Timo Glock	iSport International	1:57.258	6
7	9	(United Kingdom) Adam Carroll	Petrol Ofisi FMS International	1:57.291	7
8	22	(Japan) Kazuki Nakajima	DAMS	1:57.338	8
9	24	(Russia) Vitaly Petrov	Campos Grand Prix	1:57.410	9
10	25	(Italy) Giorgio Pantano	Campos Grand Prix	1:57.625	10
11	3	(Brazil) Alexandre Negrão	Minardi Piquet Sports	1:57.933	11
12	17	(United Kingdom) Mike Conway	Super Nova Racing	1:57.966	12
13	19	(China) Ho-Pin Tung	BCN Competición	1:57.975	13
14	14	(Spain) Javier Villa	Racing Engineering	1:58.017	14
15	1	(Switzerland) Sébastien Buemi	ART Grand Prix	1:58.102	15
16	27	(India) Karun Chandhok	Durango	1:58.170	16
17	8	(South Africa) Adrian Zaugg	Arden International	1:58.183	17
18	21	(Spain) Andy Soucek	David Price Racing	1:58.416	18
19	4	(Spain) Roldán Rodríguez	Minardi Piquet Sports	1:58.483	19
20	12	(Japan) Kohei Hirate	Trident Racing	1:58.528	20
21	20	(Denmark) Christian Bakkerud	David Price Racing	1:58.839	21
22	11	(Argentina) Ricardo Risatti	Trident Racing	1:58.925	22
23	26	(Spain) Borja García	Durango	1:58.926	23
24	18	(Finland) Markus Niemelä	BCN Competición	1:59.290	24
25	15	(Spain) Marcos Martínez	Racing Engineering	1:59.335	25
26	10	(Turkey) Jason Tahincioglu	Petrol Ofisi FMS International	2:00.087	26

=== Feature race ===
Pos.	No.	Driver	Team	Laps	Time/Retired	Grid	Points
1	23	(France) Nicolas Lapierre	DAMS	26	53:01.842	1	10+2
2	16	(Italy) Luca Filippi	Super Nova Racing	26	+4.836	2	8
3	2	(Brazil) Lucas Di Grassi	ART Grand Prix	26	+7.994	4	6
4	14	(Spain) Javier Villa	Racing Engineering	26	+8.782	14	5
5	17	(United Kingdom) Mike Conway	Super Nova Racing	26	+17.157	12	4
6	21	(Spain) Andy Soucek	David Price Racing	26	+29.016	18	3
7	27	(India) Karun Chandhok	Durango	26	+30.418	16	2
8	19	(China) Ho-Pin Tung	BCN Competición	26	+31.899	13	1
9	24	(Russia) Vitaly Petrov	Campos Grand Prix	26	+42.753	9	
10	1	(Switzerland) Sébastien Buemi	ART Grand Prix	26	+48.106	15	
11	18	(Finland) Markus Niemelä	BCN Competición	26	+48.665	24	
12	20	(Denmark) Christian Bakkerud	David Price Racing	26	+57.134	21	
13	8	(South Africa) Adrian Zaugg	Arden International	26	+1:02.351	17	
14	10	(Turkey) Jason Tahincioglu	Petrol Ofisi FMS International	26	+1:08.875	26	
15	4	(Spain) Roldán Rodríguez	Minardi Piquet Sports	26	+1:13.823	19	
16	26	(Spain) Borja García	Durango	26	+1:15.661	23	
17	5	(Germany) Timo Glock	iSport International	26	+1:30.586	6	1
18	6	(United Arab Emirates) Andreas Zuber	iSport International	25	+1 lap	5	
19	3	(Brazil) Alexandre Negrão	Minardi Piquet Sports	24	+2 laps	11	
20	11	(Argentina) Ricardo Risatti	Trident Racing	23	+3 laps	22	
Ret	9	(United Kingdom) Adam Carroll	Petrol Ofisi FMS International	19	Did not finish	7	
Ret	22	(Japan) Kazuki Nakajima	DAMS	17	Did not finish	8	
Ret	15	(Spain) Marcos Martínez	Racing Engineering	16	Did not finish	25	
Ret	7	(Brazil) Bruno Senna	Arden International	11	Did not finish	3	
Ret	25	(Italy) Giorgio Pantano	Campos Grand Prix	0	Did not finish	10	
Ret	12	(Japan) Kohei Hirate	Trident Racing	0	Did not finish	20	

=== Sprint race ===
Pos.	No.	Driver	Team	Laps	Time/Retired	Grid	Points
1	27	(India) Karun Chandhok	Durango	18	36:19.454	2	6
2	21	(Spain) Andy Soucek	David Price Racing	18	+1.531	3	5
3	2	(Brazil) Lucas di Grassi	ART Grand Prix	18	+2.682	6	4
4	19	(China) Ho-Pin Tung	BCN Competición	18	+2.975	1	3
5	17	(United Kingdom) Mike Conway	Super Nova Racing	18	+3.728	4	2
6	9	(United Kingdom) Adam Carroll	Petrol Ofisi FMS International	18	+5.636	21	1
7	16	(Italy) Luca Filippi	Super Nova Racing	18	+6.707	7	
8	7	(Brazil) Bruno Senna	Arden International	18	+8.837	24	
9	22	(Japan) Kazuki Nakajima	DAMS	18	+9.305	22	
10	4	(Spain) Roldán Rodríguez	Minardi Piquet Sports	18	+12.919	15	
11	24	(Russia) Vitaly Petrov	Campos Grand Prix	18	+20.241	9	
12	6	(United Arab Emirates) Andreas Zuber	iSport International	18	+20.379	18	
13	12	(Japan) Kohei Hirate	Trident Racing	18	+21.096	26	
14	25	(Italy) Giorgio Pantano	Campos Grand Prix	18	+22.765	25	
15	14	(Spain) Javier Villa	Racing Engineering	18	+23.033	5	
16	3	(Brazil) Alexandre Negrão	Minardi Piquet Sports	18	+28.532	19	
17	26	(Spain) Borja García	Durango	18	+34.522	16	
18	11	(Argentina) Ricardo Risatti	Trident Racing	18	+40.017	20	
19	8	(South Africa) Adrian Zaugg	Arden International	18	+53.408	13	
20	10	(Turkey) Jason Tahincioglu	Petrol Ofisi FMS International	18	+1:01.577	14	
21	23	(France) Nicolas Lapierre	DAMS	18	+1:40.001	8	1
Ret	20	(Denmark) Christian Bakkerud	David Price Racing	12	Did not finish	12	
Ret	1	(Switzerland) Sébastien Buemi	ART Grand Prix	4	Did not finish	10	
Ret	15	(Spain) Marcos Martínez	Racing Engineering	3	Did not finish	23	
Ret	18	(Finland) Markus Niemelä	BCN Competición	0	Did not finish	11	
DNS	5	(Germany) Timo Glock	iSport International	0	Did not start	17	

Previous round: 2007 Monza GP2 Series round	GP2 Series; 2007 season	Next round: 2007 Valencia GP2 Series round
Previous round: 2005 Spa-Francorchamps GP2 Series round	Spa-Francorchamps GP2 Series round	Next round: 2008 Spa-Francorchamps GP2 Series round
