= David Price Racing =

British motor racing team

(United Kingdom) David Price Racing
- Founded: 1976
- Folded: 2010
- Team principal(s): David Price
- Former series: British F3; Aurora F1; French F3; Le Mans 24 Hours; BPR Global GT Series; FIA GT Championship; Formula Renault V6 Eurocup; A1 Grand Prix; GP2 Series; GP2 Asia Series
- Teams' Championships: BPR Global GT Series: 1995
- Drivers' Championships: French Formula Three Championship: 1982: Pierre Petit; British Formula 3 Championship: 1984: Johnny Dumfries

David Price Racing (commonly referred to as DPR) was a British motor racing team, founded by David Price. The team competed in various forms of motorsport from their foundation in 1976 until 2008. The team was sold in April 2009, but continued racing in GP2 and GP2 Asia Series under the name David Price Racing until 2010.

== History ==
The team initially ran small single-seater series in Britain from the late 1970s, including British Formula 3 and Aurora F1. The team entered Giacomo Agostini's Williams FW06 in the Aurora-backed British F1 series in 1979 and 1980. Many future Formula drivers raced for the team, including Nigel Mansell, Martin Brundle, Johnny Dumfries and Tiff Needell. David Price Racing won the French F3 title in 1982 with Pierre Petit and the British F3 title with Dumfries in 1984. DPR drivers in French F3 also included Paul Belmondo, Fabien Giroix and François Hesnault from 1982 through 1986. Andrew Ridgeley, formerly of the pop duo Wham!, also ran with DPR in French F3, after the band split up.

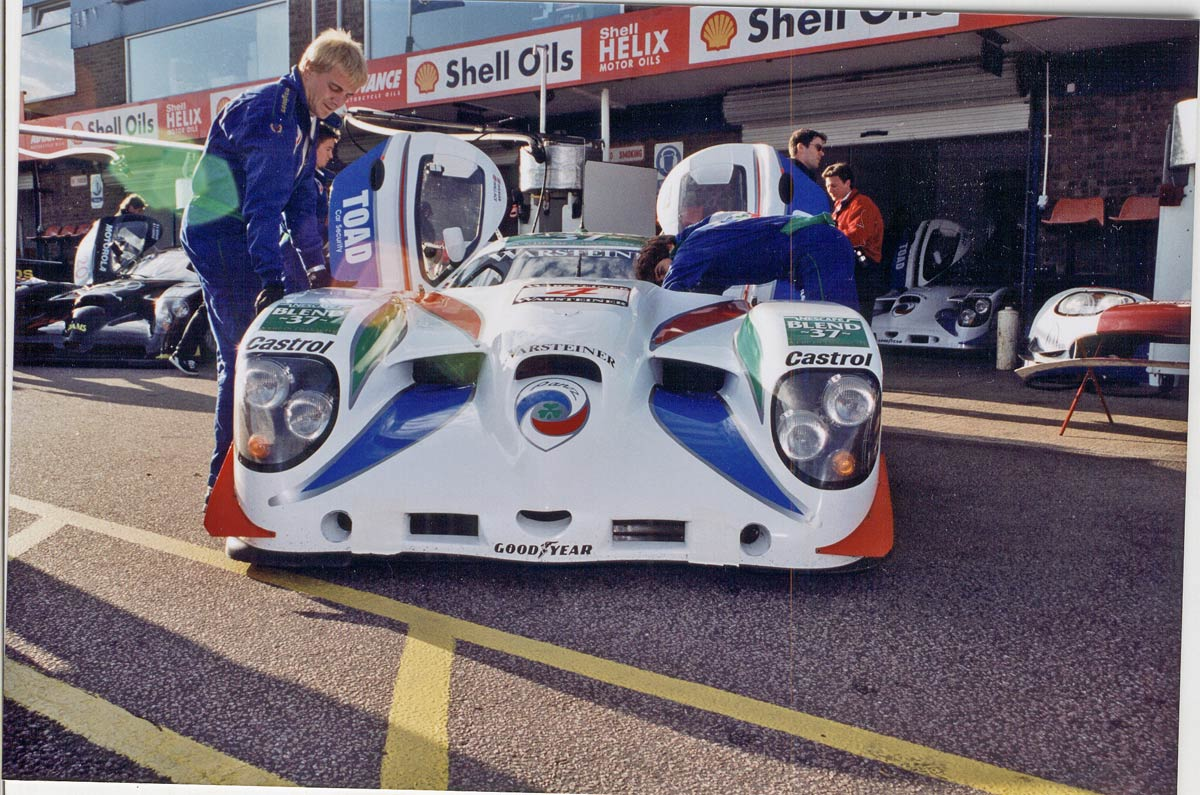
David Price Racing in 1997, with a Panoz GTR-1 in the FIA GT Championship

In 1987, David Price moved into sports car racing, becoming a team manager for Richard Lloyd Racing. Price was approached by Sauber-Mercedes in 1988, helping the team achieve the World Sportscar Championship and a 24 Hours of Le Mans victory in 1989. David Price was then headhunted by Nissan Motorsports Europe to run their sportscar program, before eventually becoming director of racing at Brabham in Formula One in 1991.

David Price Racing returned to competition in 1995, running in the BPR Global GT Series. One of the multiple McLaren F1 GTR teams in the series, they won the team and drivers championship in their first year of competition with drivers John Nielsen and Thomas Bscher. The team also finished third at the 24 Hours of Le Mans that year, running the Harrods-sponsored McLaren with drivers Andy Wallace and Derek Bell and Justin Bell. In 1996, the team finished third in the BPR championship. DPR then became the European factory team for Panoz in 1997, running their Esperante GTR-1s in the new FIA GT Championship as well as supporting the primary team in the United States. In 1998, Price was in charge of the first hybrid car ever to attempt to qualify at Le Mans, the Panoz GT-1 hybrid.

During a brief interlude from Panoz, David Price Racing ran a BMW V12 LM at the 24 Hours of Le Mans, finishing fifth overall. The team would later return to support Panoz's own Le Mans prototype efforts in the American Le Mans Series and at Le Mans itself. Following the 2001 season, DPR went on hiatus. The team would briefly assist MG in development of the XPower SV for 2002.

In 2004, David Price Racing returned, once again running single-seater cars. They ran the Formula Renault V6 Eurocup series before moving into the new GP2 Series in 2005, winning two races with Olivier Pla. The team briefly changed their name to Direxiv in 2006, before returning to the David Price Racing name in 2007. The team also ran the A1 Grand Prix series for A1 Team USA during the 2005–06 season.

Years after selling the team, Price had been involved in the DeltaWing Le Mans Prototype program since 2013.

Price died on 15 February 2023 aged 75.

== Series results ==
=== GP2 Series ===
(key) (Races in bold indicate pole position) (Races in italics indicate fastest lap)

Year	Chassis Engine Tyres	Drivers	1	2	3	4	5	6	7	8	9	10	11	12	13	14	15	16	17	18	19	20	21	22	23	T.C.	Points
2005	GP2/05; Renault; **B**		SMR; FEA	SMR; SPR	CAT; FEA	CAT; SPR	MON; FEA	NÜR; FEA	NÜR; SPR	MAG; FEA	MAG; SPR	SIL; FEA	SIL; SPR	HOC; FEA	HOC; SPR	HUN; FEA	HUN; SPR	IST; FEA	IST; SPR	MNZ; FEA	MNZ; SPR	SPA; FEA	SPA; SPR	BHR; FEA	BHR; SPR	10th	22
2005	GP2/05; Renault; **B**	(France) Olivier Pla	9	5	Ret	Ret	9	Ret	8	Ret	9	8	1	8	1	7	Ret	9	17	Ret	Ret	11	10	Ret	DNS	10th	22
2005	GP2/05; Renault; **B**	(United Kingdom) Ryan Sharp	Ret	14	Ret	16	Ret	9	9	19	Ret	Ret	NC	11	13											10th	22
2005	GP2/05; Renault; **B**	(Switzerland) Giorgio Mondini														Ret	Ret	13	Ret	Ret	Ret	Ret	21†	18	22	10th	22
2006	GP2/05; Renault; **B**		VAL; FEA	VAL; SPR	SMR; FEA	SMR; SPR	NÜR; FEA	NÜR; SPR	CAT; FEA	CAT; SPR	MON; FEA	SIL; FEA	SIL; SPR	MAG; FEA	MAG; SPR	HOC; FEA	HOC; SPR	HUN; FEA	HUN; SPR	IST; FEA	IST; SPR	MNZ; FEA	MNZ; SPR			10th	18
2006	GP2/05; Renault; **B**	(France) Olivier Pla	10	15	Ret	20†	15	Ret	DSQ	20	Ret			16	9											10th	18
2006	GP2/05; Renault; **B**	(United Kingdom) Mike Conway										11	11													10th	18
2006	GP2/05; Renault; **B**	(Russia) Vitaly Petrov														15	15	15	10	16	18	Ret	12			10th	18
2006	GP2/05; Renault; **B**	(Monaco) Clivio Piccione	Ret	Ret	Ret	16	11	Ret	16†	Ret	4	7	3	13	Ret	8	Ret	Ret	Ret	Ret	Ret	7	3			10th	18
2007	GP2/05; Renault; **B**		BHR; FEA	BHR; SPR	CAT; FEA	CAT; SPR	MON; FEA	MAG; FEA	MAG; SPR	SIL; FEA	SIL; SPR	NÜR; FEA	NÜR; SPR	HUN; FEA	HUN; SPR	IST; FEA	IST; SPR	MNZ; FEA	MNZ; SPR	SPA; FEA	SPA; SPR	VAL; FEA	VAL; SPR			12th	15
2007	GP2/05; Renault; **B**	(Denmark) Christian Bakkerud	13	Ret	12	Ret	Ret	Ret	12	Ret	21	Ret	18	Ret	DNS	DNQ	DNQ			12	Ret	Ret	Ret			12th	15
2007	GP2/05; Renault; **B**	(France) Olivier Pla																Ret	13							12th	15
2007	GP2/05; Renault; **B**	(Spain) Andy Soucek	12	9	14	Ret	14	13	10	Ret	20	Ret	13	12	Ret	Ret	Ret	Ret	7	6	2	6	3			12th	15
2008	GP2/08; Renault; **B**		CAT; FEA	CAT; SPR	IST; FEA	IST; SPR	MON; FEA	MON; FEA	MAG; FEA	MAG; SPR	SIL; FEA	SIL; SPR	HOC; FEA	HOC; SPR	HUN; FEA	HUN; SPR	VAL; FEA	VAL; SPR	SPA; FEA	SPA; SPR	MNZ; FEA	MNZ; SPR				13th	4
2008	GP2/08; Renault; **B**	(Italy) Giacomo Ricci	16	Ret	Ret	11																				13th	4
2008	GP2/08; Renault; **B**	(Spain) Andy Soucek					13	6																		13th	4
2008	GP2/08; Renault; **B**	(Romania) Michael Herck							Ret	15	23	DNS	17	Ret	Ret	17	12	14	14	11	Ret	17				13th	4
2008	GP2/08; Renault; **B**	(Brazil) Diego Nunes	15	16	13	10	15	9	11	Ret	17	Ret	Ret	Ret	12	15	10	4	12	Ret	Ret	16				13th	4
2009	GP2/08; Renault; **B**		CAT; FEA	CAT; SPR	MON; FEA	MON; FEA	IST; FEA	IST; SPR	SIL; FEA	SIL; SPR	NÜR; FEA	NÜR; SPR	HUN; FEA	HUN; SPR	VAL; FEA	VAL; SPR	SPA; FEA	SPA; SPR	MNZ; FEA	MNZ; SPR	ALG; FEA	ALG; SPR				13th	0
2009	GP2/08; Renault; **B**	(Romania) Michael Herck	13	Ret	16	16	Ret	Ret	9	8	14	12	15	Ret	13	Ret	Ret	9	20†	13	DSQ	Ret				13th	0
2009	GP2/08; Renault; **B**	(Italy) Giacomo Ricci	Ret	15	14	Ret	Ret	Ret	17	DNS																13th	0
2009	GP2/08; Renault; **B**	(France) Franck Perera									Ret	16	EX	18	15	16†	DNQ	DNQ								13th	0
2009	GP2/08; Renault; **B**	(Venezuela) Johnny Cecotto Jr.																	18†	16†	DNS	18				13th	0
2010	GP2/08; Renault; **B**		CAT; FEA	CAT; SPR	MON; FEA	MON; SPR	IST; FEA	IST; SPR	VAL; FEA	VAL; SPR	SIL; FEA	SIL; SPR	HOC; FEA	HOC; SPR	HUN; FEA	HUN; SPR	SPA; FEA	SPA; SPR	MNZ; FEA	MNZ; SPR	YMC; FEA	YMC; SPR				8th	28
2010	GP2/08; Renault; **B**	(Romania) Michael Herck	17	21	16	Ret	6	5	8	3	22	14	9	8	7	Ret	Ret	13	Ret	Ret	16	10				8th	28
2010	GP2/08; Renault; **B**	(Italy) Giacomo Ricci	2	8	17	Ret	Ret	17	Ret	Ret	13	12	16†	11	8	1										8th	28
2010	GP2/08; Renault; **B**	(Italy) Fabrizio Crestani															Ret	14	10	15	13	14				8th	28

=== GP2 Asia Series ===
(key) (Races in bold indicate pole position) (Races in italics indicate fastest lap)

Year	Chassis Engine Tyres	Drivers	1	2	3	4	5	6	7	8	9	10	11	12	T.C.	Points
2008	GP2/05; Renault; **B**		DUB1; FEA	DUB1; SPR	SEN; FEA	SEN; SPR	SEP; FEA	SEP; SPR	BHR; FEA	BHR; SPR	DUB2; FEA	DUB2; SPR			11th	8
2008	GP2/05; Renault; **B**	(India) Armaan Ebrahim	21	Ret	Ret	9	Ret	19	13	16	19	Ret			11th	8
2008	GP2/05; Renault; **B**	(Spain) Andy Soucek	3	7											11th	8
2008	GP2/05; Renault; **B**	(Brazil) Diego Nunes			Ret	10	10	13	7	Ret	17	12			11th	8
2008–09	GP2/05; Renault; **B**		SHI; FEA	SHI; SPR	DUB3; FEA	DUB3; SPR	BHR1; FEA	BHR1; SPR	LSL; FEA	LSL; SPR	SEP; FEA	SEP; SPR	BHR2; FEA	BHR2; SPR	13th	0
2008–09	GP2/05; Renault; **B**	(Romania) Michael Herck	16	16	15	C	18	18	15	Ret	13	Ret	13	Ret	13th	0
2008–09	GP2/05; Renault; **B**	(Japan) Yuhi Sekiguchi	Ret	12											13th	0
2008–09	GP2/05; Renault; **B**	(Italy) Giacomo Ricci			13	C	Ret	16	Ret	13	16	15	11	10	13th	0
2009–10	GP2/05; Renault; **B**		YMC1; FEA	YMC1; SPR	YMC2; FEA	YMC2; SPR	BHR1; FEA	BHR1; SPR	BHR2; FEA	BHR2; SPR					**3rd**	**36**
2009–10	GP2/05; Renault; **B**	(Romania) Michael Herck	13	9	7	2	23	13	18	Ret					**3rd**	**36**
2009–10	GP2/05; Renault; **B**	(Italy) Giacomo Ricci	Ret	Ret	5	3	4	2	5	1					**3rd**	**36**
