= 2006 Catalunya GP2 Series round =

2006 GP2 race held in Spain

2006 Spain GP2 round
Round details
- Round 4 of 11 rounds in the 2006 GP2 Series
- Layout of the Circuit de Catalunya
- Location: Circuit de Catalunya, Montmeló, Catalonia, Spain
- Course: Permanent racing facility 4.627 km (2.875 mi)

GP2 Series

Feature race
- Date: 13 May 2006
- Laps: 39

Pole position
Driver	(Brazil) Nelson Piquet Jr.	Piquet Sports
- Time: 1:23.704

Podium
First	(France) Alexandre Prémat	ART Grand Prix
Second	(United Kingdom) Lewis Hamilton	ART Grand Prix
Third	(Germany) Michael Ammermüller	Arden International

Fastest lap
Driver	(Spain) Adrián Vallés	Campos Racing
- Time: 1:25.550 (on lap 37)

Sprint race
- Date: 14 May 2006
- Laps: 26

Podium
First	(Venezuela) Ernesto Viso	iSport International
Second	(Brazil) Nelson Piquet Jr.	Piquet Sports
Third	(France) Alexandre Prémat	ART Grand Prix

Fastest lap
Driver	(Italy) Gianmaria Bruni	Trident Racing
- Time: 1:25.970 (on lap 8)

The 2006 Catalunya GP2 Series round were a pair of motor races held on 13 and 14 May 2006 at the Circuit de Catalunya in Montmeló, Catalonia, Spain as part of the GP2 Series. It was the fourth round of the 2006 GP2 season.

== Classification ==
=== Qualifying ===
Pos.	No.	Driver	Team	Time	Grid
1	11	(Brazil) Nelson Piquet Jr.	Piquet Sports	1:23.704	1
2	1	(France) Alexandre Prémat	ART Grand Prix	1:23.758	2
3	9	(United Kingdom) Adam Carroll	Racing Engineering	1:23.916	3
4	2	(United Kingdom) Lewis Hamilton	ART Grand Prix	1:24.001	4
5	3	(Germany) Michael Ammermüller	Arden International	1:24.102	5
6	15	(France) Franck Perera	DAMS	1:24.162	6
7	5	(Argentina) José María López	Super Nova Racing	1:24.190	7
8	26	(Italy) Gianmaria Bruni	Trident Racing	1:24.238	8
9	20	(France) Olivier Pla	DPR Direxiv	1:24.257	9
10	21	(Monaco) Clivio Piccione	DPR Direxiv	1:24.294	10
11	8	(France) Tristan Gommendy	iSport International	1:24.513	11
12	27	(United Arab Emirates) Andreas Zuber	Trident Racing	1:24.611	12
13	4	(France) Nicolas Lapierre	Arden International	1:24.731	13
14	24	(Spain) Adrián Vallés	Campos Racing	1:24.858	14
15	19	(Germany) Timo Glock	BCN Competicion	1:24.870	15
16	12	(Brazil) Alexandre Negrão	Piquet Sports	1:24.920	16
17	18	(Japan) Hiroki Yoshimoto	BCN Competicion	1:25.179	17
18	23	(Spain) Sergio Hernández	Durango	1:25.180	18
19	22	(Brazil) Lucas di Grassi	Durango	1:25.266	19
20	14	(Italy) Ferdinando Monfardini	DAMS	1:25.348	20
21	7	(Venezuela) Ernesto Viso	iSport International	1:25.515	21
22	25	(Spain) Félix Porteiro	Campos Racing	1:25.657	22
23	17	(Turkey) Jason Tahincioğlu	FMS International	1:25.811	23
24	6	(Malaysia) Fairuz Fauzy	Super Nova Racing	1:25.996	24
25	16	(Italy) Giorgio Pantano	FMS International	1:26.035	25
26	10	(Spain) Javier Villa	Racing Engineering	1:26.111	26

=== Feature Race ===
Pos.	No.	Driver	Team	Laps	Time/Retired	Grid	Points
1	1	(France) Alexandre Prémat	ART Grand Prix	39	57:24.150	2	10
2	2	(United Kingdom) Lewis Hamilton	ART Grand Prix	39	+2.187	4	8
3	3	(Germany) Michael Ammermüller	Arden International	39	+10.963	5	6
4	11	(Brazil) Nelson Piquet Jr.	Piquet Sports	39	+11.720	1	7 (5+2)
5	8	(France) Tristan Gommendy	iSport International	39	+13.005	11	4
6	14	(Italy) Ferdinando Monfardini	DAMS	39	+14.848	20	3
7	12	(Brazil) Alexandre Negrão	Piquet Sports	39	+20.113	16	2
8	7	(Venezuela) Ernesto Viso	iSport International	39	+31.742	21	1
9	16	(Italy) Giorgio Pantano	FMS International	39	+33.713	25	
10	9	(United Kingdom) Adam Carroll	Racing Engineering	39	+38.173	3	
11	19	(Germany) Timo Glock	BCN Competicion	39	+48.660	15	
12	22	(Brazil) Lucas di Grassi	Durango	39	+53.303	19	
13	15	(France) Franck Perera	DAMS	39	+1:02.590	6	
14	10	(Spain) Javier Villa	Racing Engineering	39	+1:07.219	26	
15	17	(Turkey) Jason Tahincioğlu	FMS International	39	+1:07.539	23	
16	21	(Monaco) Clivio Piccione	DPR Direxiv	38	+1 Lap	10	
17	25	(Spain) Félix Porteiro	Campos Racing	38	+1 Lap	22	
18	24	(Spain) Adrián Vallés	Campos Racing	37	+2 Laps	14	1
Ret	4	(France) Nicolas Lapierre	Arden International	34	Gearbox	13	
Ret	5	(Argentina) José María López	Super Nova Racing	22	Collision	7	
Ret	26	(Italy) Gianmaria Bruni	Trident Racing	22	Collision	8	
Ret	18	(Japan) Hiroki Yoshimoto	BCN Competicion	20	Retired	17	
Ret	23	(Spain) Sergio Hernández	Durango	16	Retired	18	
Ret	27	(United Arab Emirates) Andreas Zuber	Trident Racing	16	Puncture	12	
Ret	6	(Malaysia) Fairuz Fauzy	Super Nova Racing	15	Retired	24	
DSQ	20	(France) Olivier Pla	DPR Direxiv	39	Disqualified	9	
Fastest lap: Adrián Vallés (Campos Racing) — 1:25.550 (on lap 37)

=== Sprint Race ===
Pos.	No.	Driver	Team	Laps	Time/Retired	Grid	Points
1	7	(Venezuela) Ernesto Viso	iSport International	26	37:37.277	1	6
2	11	(Brazil) Nelson Piquet Jr.	Piquet Sports	26	+0.730	5	5
3	1	(France) Alexandre Prémat	ART Grand Prix	26	+1.581	8	4
4	2	(United Kingdom) Lewis Hamilton	ART Grand Prix	26	+2.443	7	3
5	8	(France) Tristan Gommendy	iSport International	26	+3.987	4	2
6	14	(Italy) Ferdinando Monfardini	DAMS	26	+15.879	3	1
7	16	(Italy) Giorgio Pantano	FMS International	26	+21.526	9	
8	3	(Germany) Michael Ammermüller	Arden International	26	+30.711	6	
9	22	(Brazil) Lucas di Grassi	Durango	26	+31.033	12	
10	19	(Germany) Timo Glock	BCN Competicion	26	+34.009	11	
11	27	(United Arab Emirates) Andreas Zuber	Trident Racing	26	+34.715	24	
12	9	(United Kingdom) Adam Carroll	Racing Engineering	26	+36.327	10	
13	23	(Spain) Sergio Hernández	Durango	26	+39.764	23	
14	6	(Malaysia) Fairuz Fauzy	Super Nova Racing	26	+50.479	25	
15	10	(Spain) Javier Villa	Racing Engineering	26	+51.073	14	
16	24	(Spain) Adrián Vallés	Campos Racing	26	+1:10.645	18	
17	26	(Italy) Gianmaria Bruni	Trident Racing	26	+1:16.247	21	1
18	12	(Brazil) Alexandre Negrão	Piquet Sports	26	+1:22.227	2	
19	17	(Turkey) Jason Tahincioğlu	FMS International	25	+1 Lap	15	
20	20	(France) Olivier Pla	DPR Direxiv	25	+1 Lap	26	
Ret	4	(France) Nicolas Lapierre	Arden International	20	Engine	19	
Ret	18	(Japan) Hiroki Yoshimoto	BCN Competicion	16	Gearbox	22	
Ret	25	(Spain) Félix Porteiro	Campos Racing	12	Gearbox	17	
Ret	5	(Argentina) José María López	Super Nova Racing	8	Engine	20	
Ret	15	(France) Franck Perera	DAMS	0	Collision	13	
Ret	21	(Monaco) Clivio Piccione	DPR Direxiv	0	Collision	16	
Fastest lap: Gianmaria Bruni (Trident Racing) — 1:25.970 (on lap 8)

== Standings after the round ==
Drivers' Championship standings

	Pos	Driver	Points
	1	(Brazil) Nelson Piquet Jr.	39
	2	(United Kingdom) Lewis Hamilton	37
4	3	(France) Alexandre Prémat	27
	4	(Venezuela) Ernesto Viso	26
2	5	(France) Nicolas Lapierre	25

Teams' Championship standings

	Pos	Team	Points
1	1	(France) ART Grand Prix	64
1	2	(United Kingdom) Arden International	48
	3	(Brazil) Piquet Sports	43
	4	(United Kingdom) iSport International	32
	5	(Italy) Trident Racing	20

- Note: Only the top five positions are included for both sets of standings.

Previous round: 2006 European GP2 Series round	GP2 Series; 2006 season	Next round: 2006 Monaco GP2 Series round
Previous round: 2005 Catalunya GP2 Series round	Catalunya GP2 round	Next round: 2007 Catalunya GP2 Series round
