= 2006 San Marino GP2 Series round =

2006 San Marino GP2 round
Round details
- Round 2 of 11 rounds in the 2006 GP2 Series
- Layout of the Autodromo Enzo e Dino Ferrari
- Location: Autodromo Enzo e Dino Ferrari, Imola, Italy
- Course: Permanent Road Course; 4.959 km (3.081 mi)

GP2 Series

Feature race
- Date: 22 April 2006
- Laps: 37

Pole position
Driver	(Italy) Gianmaria Bruni	Trident
- Time: 1:32.691

Podium
First	(Italy) Gianmaria Bruni	Trident
Second	(Germany) Michael Ammermuller	Arden International
Third	(France) Nicolas Lapierre	Arden International

Fastest lap
Driver	(Spain) Adrian Valles (Note: Adrián Vallés set the fastest lap, but he started from the pitlane, so the points were given to Gianmaria Bruni.)	Campos Racing
- Time: 1:35.261 (on lap 13)

Sprint race
- Date: 23 April 2006
- Laps: 25

Podium
First	(Venezuela) E. J. Viso	iSport International
Second	(Brazil) Nelson Piquet Jr.	Piquet Sports
Third	(Japan) Hiroki Yoshimoto	BCN Competicion

Fastest lap
Driver	(Venezuela) E. J. Viso	iSport International
- Time: 1:34.431 (on lap 24)

The 2006 San Marino GP2 Series round were a pair of motor races held on 22 and 23 April 2006 at the Autodromo Enzo e Dino Ferrari in Imola as part of the GP2 Series. It was the second round of the 2006 GP2 season.

== Classification ==
=== Qualifying ===
Pos.	No.	Driver	Team	Time	Grid
1	26	(Italy) Gianmaria Bruni	Trident	1:32.691	1
2	5	(Argentina) José María López	Super Nova Racing	1:32.941	2
3	2	(United Kingdom) Lewis Hamilton	ART Grand Prix	1:32.990	3
4	1	(France) Alexandre Prémat	ART Grand Prix	1:33.138	4
5	18	(Japan) Hiroki Yoshimoto	BCN Competicion	1:33.342	5
6	11	(Brazil) Nelson Piquet Jr.	Piquet Sports	1:33.402	6
7	9	(Republic of Ireland) Adam Carroll	Racing Engineering	1:33.450	7
8	4	(France) Nicolas Lapierre	Arden International	1:33.519	8
9	3	(Germany) Michael Ammermüller	Arden International	1:33.602	9
10	21	(Monaco) Clivio Piccione	DPR Direxiv	1:33.626	10
11	25	(Spain) Félix Porteiro	Campos Racing	1:33.713	11
12	7	(Venezuela) E. J. Viso	iSport International	1:33.733	12
13	20	(France) Olivier Pla	DPR Direxiv	1:33.892	13
14	16	(Italy) Luca Filippi	FMS International	1:33.955	14
15	24	(Spain) Adrián Vallés	Campos Racing	1:34.048	15
16	8	(France) Tristan Gommendy	iSport International	1:34.116	16
17	27	(United Arab Emirates) Andreas Zuber	Trident	1:34.181	17
18	12	(Brazil) Alexandre Sarnes Negrão	Piquet Sports	1:34.219	18
19	15	(France) Franck Perera	DAMS	1:34.230	19
20	14	(Italy) Ferdinando Monfardini	DAMS	1:34.369	20
21	8	(Germany) Timo Glock	BCN Competicion	1:34.371	21
22	22	(Brazil) Lucas di Grassi	Durango	1:34.405	22
23	6	(Malaysia) Fairuz Fauzy	Super Nova Racing	1:34.697	23
24	17	(Turkey) Jason Tahincioglu	FMS International	1:35.397	24
25	23	(Spain) Sergio Hernández	Durango	1:35.583	25
26	10	(Spain) Javier Villa	Racing Engineering	1:35.861	26

=== Feature Race ===
Pos.	No.	Driver	Team	Laps	Time/Retired	Grid	Points
1	26	(Italy) Gianmaria Bruni	Trident	37	1hr 01min 13.889sec	1	13
2	3	(Germany) Michael Ammermüller	Arden International	37	+ 10.907 s	3	8
3	4	(France) Nicolas Lapierre	Arden International	37	+ 14.514 s	5	6
4	1	(France) Alexandre Prémat	ART Grand Prix	37	+ 15.713 s	21	5
5	11	(Brazil) Nelson Piquet Jr.	Piquet Sports	37	+ 16.772 s	6	4
6	7	(Venezuela) E. J. Viso	iSport International	37	+ 19.669 s	10	3
7	19	(Germany) Timo Glock	BCN Competicion	37	+ 47.806 s	7	2
8	18	(Japan) Hiroki Yoshimoto	BCN Competicion	37	+ 48.208 s	5	1
9	24	(Spain) Adrián Vallés	Campos Racing	37	+ 52.315 s	9	
10	25	(Spain) Félix Porteiro	Campos Racing	37	+ 1:09.547 s	15	
11	16	(Italy) Luca Filippi	FMS International	37	+ 1:23.448 s	12	
12	14	(Italy) Ferdinando Monfardini	DAMS	37	+ 1:23.703 s	17	
13	10	(Spain) Javier Villa	Racing Engineering	37	+ 1:27.070 s	11	
Ret	27	(United Arab Emirates) Andreas Zuber	Trident	30	Puncture	13	
Ret	8	(France) Tristan Gommendy	iSport International	30	Accident	22	
Ret	6	(Malaysia) Fairuz Fauzy	Super Nova Racing	29	Accident	22	
Ret	9	(Republic of Ireland) Adam Carroll	Racing Engineering	26	Spun off	43	
Ret	17	(Turkey) Jason Tahincioğlu	FMS International	25	Engine	25	
Ret	23	(Spain) Sergio Hernández	Durango	25	Retired	18	
Ret	12	(Brazil) Alexandre Sarnes Negrão	Piquet Sports	13	Accident	14	
Ret	15	(France) Franck Perera	DAMS	13	Accident	19	
Ret	22	(Brazil) Lucas di Grassi	Durango	7	Accident	8	
Ret	20	(France) Olivier Pla	DPR Direxiv	7	Accident	24	
Ret	5	(Argentina) José María López	Super Nova Racing	1	Gearbox	2	
Ret	21	(Monaco) Clivio Piccione	DPR Direxiv	0	Engine	16	
DSQ	2	(United Kingdom) Lewis Hamilton	ART Grand Prix	37	Overtook safety car	26	
Fastest lap: Adrián Vallés (Campos Racing) — 1:35.261 (116.472 mph)

=== Sprint Race ===
Pos.	No.	Driver	Team	Laps	Time/Retired	Grid	Points
1	7	(Venezuela) E. J. Viso	iSport International	25	45min 17.116sec	3	7
2	11	(Brazil) Nelson Piquet Jr.	Piquet Sports	25	+ 0.596 s	4	5
3	18	(Japan) Hiroki Yoshimoto	BCN Competicion	25	+ 25.001 s	1	4
4	19	(Germany) Timo Glock	BCN Competicion	25	+ 28.901 s	2	3
5	16	(Italy) Luca Filippi	FMS International	25	+ 29.278 s	11	2
6	25	(Spain) Félix Porteiro	Campos Racing	25	+ 30.351 s	10	1
7	4	(France) Nicolas Lapierre	Arden International	25	+ 31.502 s	6	
8	27	(United Arab Emirates) Andreas Zuber	Trident	25	+ 31.809 s	14	
9	14	(Italy) Ferdinando Monfardini	DAMS	25	+ 32.449 s	12	
10	2	(United Kingdom) Lewis Hamilton	ART Grand Prix	25	+ 33.366 s	26	
11	12	(Brazil) Alexandre Sarnes Negrão	Piquet Sports	25	+ 35.826 s	20	
12	9	(Republic of Ireland) Adam Carroll	Racing Engineering	25	+ 39.654 s	17	
13	23	(Spain) Sergio Hernández	Durango	25	+ 40.089 s	19	
14	15	(France) Franck Perera	DAMS	25	+ 40.399 s	21	
15	6	(Malaysia) Fairuz Fauzy	Super Nova Racing	25	+ 41.753 s	16	
16	21	(Monaco) Clivio Piccione	DPR Direxiv	25	+ 43.206 s	25	
17	8	(France) Tristan Gommendy	iSport International	24	+ 49.138 s	15	
18	10	(Spain) Javier Villa	Racing Engineering	25	+ 1:05.304 s	13	
19	5	(Argentina) José María López	Super Nova Racing	23	+ 2 Laps	24	
20	20	(France) Olivier Pla	DPR Direxiv	23	+ 2 Laps	23	
Ret	17	(Turkey) Jason Tahincioğlu	FMS International	5	Engine	18	
Ret	26	(Italy) Gianmaria Bruni	Trident	12	Brakes	8	
Ret	3	(Germany) Michael Ammermüller	Arden International	1	Collision damage	7	
Ret	1	(France) Alexandre Prémat	ART Grand Prix	0	Accident	5	
Ret	24	(Spain) Adrián Vallés	Campos Racing	0	Accident	9	
Ret	22	(Brazil) Lucas di Grassi	Durango	0	Accident	22	
Fastest lap: E. J. Viso (iSport International) — 1:34.431 (117.471 mph)

== Standings after the round ==
Drivers' Championship standings

Pos	Driver	Points
1	(Brazil) Nelson Piquet Jr.	25
2	(Italy) Gianmaria Bruni	18
3	(Venezuela) E. J. Viso	16
4	(Germany) Michael Ammermüller	16
5	(France) Nicolas Lapierre	16

Teams' Championship standings

Pos	Team	Points
1	(United Kingdom) Arden International	32
2	(Brazil) Piquet Sports	25
3	(Italy) Trident	18
4	(United Kingdom) iSport International	16
5	(United Kingdom) ART Grand Prix	14

- Note: Only the top five positions are included for both sets of standings.

== Notes ==
Previous round: 2006 Valencia GP2 Series round	GP2 Series; 2006 season	Next round: 2006 European GP2 Series round
Previous round: 2005 Imola GP2 Series round	San Marino GP2 round	Next round: 2011 Imola GP2 Asia Series round
