= 2006 Monaco GP2 Series round =

Motor racing competition

2006 Monaco GP2 round
Round details
- Round 5 of 11 rounds in the 2006 GP2 Series
- Location: Circuit de Monaco, Monte Carlo, Monaco
- Course: Permanent racing facility 3.340 km (2.08 mi)

GP2 Series

Feature race
- Date: 27 May 2006
- Laps: 45

Pole position
| Driver | (United Kingdom) Lewis Hamilton | ART Grand Prix |
- Time: 1:20.430

Podium
| First | (United Kingdom) Lewis Hamilton | ART Grand Prix |
| Second | (France) Franck Perera | DAMS |
| Third | (France) Alexandre Prémat | ART Grand Prix |

Fastest lap
| Driver | (Brazil) Lucas di Grassi | Durango |
- Time: 1:22.563 (on lap 24)

Sprint race

The 2006 Monaco GP2 round was a GP2 Series motor race held on 21 May 2006 at the Circuit de Monaco in Monte Carlo, Monaco. It was the third race of the 2006 GP2 Series. The race was used to support the 2006 Monaco Grand Prix.

== Report ==
=== Qualifying ===
Indeed, Hamilton was the man to beat in qualifying as he set a new GP2 lap record in the Principality, claiming pole with a 1:20.430. Franck Perera was his closest challenger in second, a quarter of a second behind, while Gianmaria Bruni and Alexandre Prémat shared the second row.

=== Feature race ===
There would be no heading Hamilton at the start of the race either, with the #2 ART Grand Prix car shooting into the lead as the lights went out. Perera was hence left to hold second in the Brit's wake into Sainte Devote, while poor starts for Bruni and Prémat let Olivier Pla leap into third.

Behind, however, the start would be more confused, with Tristan Gommendy striking José María López, which sent the Frenchman literally flying into Nicolas Lapierre. Javier Villa was also removed by the out of control trio, while Bruni, Alexandre Negrão and Championship leader Nelson Piquet Jr. were all delayed.

Remarkably, despite four cars being abandoned on track, and a further retirement for Adam Carroll later around the opening tour, there would be no Safety Car, with stunningly quick work from the marshals clearing the circuit under yellow flags. That meant that Hamilton could make his escape during the early laps, although Perera would exchange a barrage of fastest laps with the Brit as the race settled down.

That fight was effectively over by lap thirteen when Perera stopped, with Hamilton making his stop three laps later and resuming with the race lead. Perera was split from the Brit's tail by a yet to stop Andreas Zuber, although Hamilton's lead over the Frenchman had been cut to three seconds from ten before the stops.

Once Zuber pitted Perera was clear to attack Hamilton, although he never closed to within three seconds despite the fact that the lead duo had begun to catch the tail of the field. Indeed, Hamilton and Perera would go on to lap everyone up and including sixth on track, although Hamilton would be denied the fastest lap point as a result.

That point would go to Lucas di Grassi, with the Brazilian setting the best lap of the race moments before he punted Jason Tahincioğlu out of the way, the Turkish racer having formed a rolling roadblock for most of the race. Elsewhere, Ernesto Viso battled from the back into the points, only to be taken out by Ferdinando Monfardini after the Italian racer made a very late lunge to try and pass Michael Ammermüller into the Nouvelle Chicane.

With that the race was run, with Hamilton claiming victory by eight seconds from Perera, while Prémat was a distant third. Home racer Clivio Piccione secured fourth ahead of late-stopper Zuber, while Félix Porteiro was a lap down in sixth. Ammermüller was next up ahead of Sergio Hernández, the last scorer, while di Grassi denied Hamilton a Grand Slam by finishing with fastest lap down in eleventh.

== Classification ==
=== Qualifying ===
| Pos. | No. | Driver | Team | Time | Gap | Grid |
|---|---|---|---|---|---|---|
| 1 | 2 | (United Kingdom) Lewis Hamilton | ART Grand Prix | 1:20.430 | | 1 |
| 2 | 15 | (France) Franck Perera | DAMS | 1:20.717 | +0.287 | 2 |
| 3 | 26 | (Italy) Gianmaria Bruni | Trident Racing | 1:21.155 | +0.725 | 3 |
| 4 | 1 | (France) Alexandre Prémat | ART Grand Prix | 1:21.227 | +0.797 | 4 |
| 5 | 20 | (France) Olivier Pla | DPR Direxiv | 1:21.277 | +0.847 | 5 |
| 6 | 21 | (Monaco) Clivio Piccione | DPR Direxiv | 1:21.386 | +0.956 | 6 |
| 7 | 9 | (United Kingdom) Adam Carroll | Racing Engineering | 1:21.542 | +1.112 | 7 |
| 8 | 24 | (Spain) Adrián Vallés | Campos Racing | 1:21.616 | +1.186 | 8 |
| 9 | 25 | (Spain) Félix Porteiro | Campos Racing | 1:21.679 | +1.249 | 9 |
| 10 | 27 | (United Arab Emirates) Andreas Zuber | Trident Racing | 1:21.744 | +1.314 | 10 |
| 11 | 22 | (Brazil) Lucas di Grassi | Durango | 1:21.926 | +1.496 | 11 |
| 12 | 11 | (Brazil) Nelson Piquet Jr. | Piquet Sports | 1:21.940 | +1.510 | 12 |
| 13 | 10 | (Spain) Javier Villa | Racing Engineering | 1:22.075 | +1.645 | 13 |
| 14 | 4 | (France) Nicolas Lapierre | Arden International | 1:22.112 | +1.682 | 14 |
| 15 | 5 | (Argentina) José María López | Super Nova International | 1:22.296 | +1.866 | 15 |
| 16 | 8 | (France) Tristan Gommendy | iSport International | 1:22.377 | +1.947 | 16 |
| 17 | 19 | (Germany) Timo Glock | BCN Competición | 1:22.428 | +1.998 | 17 |
| 18 | 16 | (Italy) Giorgio Pantano | Petrol Ofisi FMS International | 1:22.474 | +2.044 | 18 |
| 19 | 14 | (Italy) Ferdinando Monfardini | DAMS | 1:22.620 | +2.190 | 19 |
| 20 | 3 | (Germany) Michael Ammermüller | Arden International | 1:22.702 | +2.272 | 20 |
| 21 | 6 | (Malaysia) Fairuz Fauzy | Super Nova International | 1:23.231 | +2.801 | 21 |
| 22 | 23 | (Spain) Sergio Hernández | Durango | 1:23.418 | +2.988 | 22 |
| 23 | 12 | (Brazil) Alexandre Negrão | Piquet Sports | 1:23.569 | +3.139 | 23 |
| 24 | 7 | (Venezuela) Ernesto Viso | iSport International | 1:24.130 | +3.700 | 24 |
| 25 | 18 | (Japan) Hiroki Yoshimoto | BCN Competición | 1:24.335 | +3.905 | 25 |
| 26 | 17 | (Turkey) Jason Tahinci | Petrol Ofisi FMS International | 1:25.997 | +5.567 | 26 |
107% time: 1:26.060

== Championship standings after the round ==
Drivers' Championship standings

| | Pos | Driver | Points |
|---|---|---|---|
| 1 | 1 | (United Kingdom) Lewis Hamilton | 49 |
| 1 | 2 | (Brazil) Nelson Piquet Jr. | 39 |
| | 3 | (France) Alexandre Prémat | 33 |
| | 4 | (Venezuela) Ernesto Viso | 26 |
| 1 | 5 | (Germany) Michael Ammermüller | 25 |

Teams' Championship standings

| Pos | Team | Points |
|---|---|---|
| 1 | (France) ART Grand Prix | 82 |
| 2 | (Netherlands) Arden International | 50 |
| 3 | (Brazil) Piquet Sports | 43 |
| 4 | (United Kingdom) iSport International | 32 |
| 5 | (Italy) Trident Racing | 24 |

- Note: Only the top five positions are included for both sets of standings.

| Previous round: 2006 Catalunya GP2 Series round | GP2 Series; 2006 season | Next round: 2006 Silverstone GP2 Series round |
| Previous round: 2005 Monaco GP2 Series round | Monaco GP2 round | Next round: 2007 Monaco GP2 Series round |
