= 2006 Hockenheimring GP2 Series round =

(Germany) 2006 Hockenheimring GP2 round
Round details
- Round 8 of 11 rounds in the 2006 GP2 Series
- Hockenheimring
- Location: Hockenheimring, Hockenheim, Germany
- Course: Permanent racing facility 4.574 km (2.842 mi)

GP2 Series

Feature race
- Date: 29 July 2006
- Laps: 40

Pole position
| Driver | (Italy) Gianmaria Bruni | Trident Racing |
- Time: 1:22.588

Podium
| First | (Italy) Gianmaria Bruni | Trident Racing |
| Second | (United Kingdom) Lewis Hamilton | ART Grand Prix |
| Third | (Germany) Timo Glock | iSport International |

Fastest lap
| Driver | (France) Alexandre Prémat | ART Grand Prix |
- Time: 1:23.774 (on lap 36)

Sprint race
- Date: 30 July 2006
- Laps: 27

Podium
| First | (Germany) Timo Glock | iSport International |
| Second | (Argentina) José María López | Super Nova Racing |
| Third | (United Kingdom) Lewis Hamilton | ART Grand Prix |

Fastest lap
| Driver | (Brazil) Lucas di Grassi (Note: Lucas di Grassi did not finish the race so the points were given to José María López.) | Durango |
- Time: 1:24.477 (on lap 13)

The 2006 Hockenheimring GP2 Series round was a GP2 Series motor race held on July 29 and 30, 2006 at the Hockenheimring in Baden-Württemberg, Germany. It was the eighth round of the 2006 GP2 Series season. The race weekend supported the 2006 German Grand Prix.

== Classification ==
=== Qualifying ===
| Pos. | No. | Driver | Team | Time | Grid |
|---|---|---|---|---|---|
| 1 | 26 | (Italy) Gianmaria Bruni | Trident | 1:22.588 | 1 |
| 2 | 8 | (Germany) Timo Glock | iSport International | 1:22.910 | 2 |
| 3 | 11 | (Brazil) Nelson Piquet Jr. | Piquet Sports | 1:22.928 | 3 |
| 4 | 7 | (Venezuela) Ernesto Viso | iSport International | 1:22.947 | 4 |
| 5 | 16 | (Italy) Giorgio Pantano | FMS International | 1:22.994 | 5 |
| 6 | 15 | (France) Franck Perera | DAMS | 1:23.127 | 6 |
| 7 | 22 | (Brazil) Lucas di Grassi | Durango | 1:23.147 | 7 |
| 8 | 2 | (United Kingdom) Lewis Hamilton | ART Grand Prix | 1:23.169 | 8 |
| 9 | 27 | (United Arab Emirates) Andreas Zuber | Trident | 1:23.302 | 9 |
| 10 | 1 | (France) Alexandre Prémat | ART Grand Prix | 1:23.309 | 10 |
| 11 | 14 | (Italy) Ferdinando Monfardini | DAMS | 1:23.315 | 11 |
| 12 | 9 | (United Kingdom) Adam Carroll | Racing Engineering | 1:23.457 | 12 |
| 13 | 4 | (France) Nicolas Lapierre | Arden International | 1:23.472 | 13 |
| 14 | 18 | (Japan) Hiroki Yoshimoto | BCN Competición | 1:23.539 | 14 |
| 15 | 19 | (Italy) Luca Filippi | BCN Competición | 1:23.575 | 15 |
| 16 | 21 | (Monaco) Clivio Piccione | DPR Direxiv | 1:23.692 | 16 |
| 17 | 6 | (Malaysia) Fairuz Fauzy | Super Nova Racing | 1:23.769 | 17 |
| 18 | 12 | (Brazil) Alexandre Negrão | Piquet Sports | 1:23.785 | 18 |
| 19 | 3 | (Germany) Michael Ammermüller | Arden International | 1:23.898 | 19 |
| 20 | 25 | (Spain) Félix Porteiro | Campos Racing | 1:24.035 | 20 |
| 21 | 23 | (Spain) Sergio Hernández | Durango | 1:24.057 | 21 |
| 22 | 10 | (Spain) Javier Villa | Racing Engineering | 1:24.060 | 22 |
| 23 | 20 | (Russia) Vitaly Petrov | DPR Direxiv | 1:24.609 | 23 |
| 24 | 17 | (Turkey) Jason Tahincioglu | FMS International | 1:25.380 | 24 |
| 25 | 24 | (Spain) Adrián Vallés | Campos Racing | 1:29.211 | 25 |
| 26 | 5 | (Argentina) José María López | Super Nova Racing | 1:54.731 | 26 |

=== Feature race ===
| Pos. | No. | Driver | Team | Laps | Time/Retired | Grid | Points |
|---|---|---|---|---|---|---|---|
| 1 | 26 | (Italy) Gianmaria Bruni | Trident Racing | 40 | 57:40.763 | 1 | 10+2 |
| 2 | 2 | (United Kingdom) Lewis Hamilton | ART Grand Prix | 40 | +1.238 | 8 | 8 |
| 3 | 8 | (Germany) Timo Glock | iSport International | 40 | +16.319 | 2 | 6 |
| 4 | 7 | (Venezuela) Ernesto Viso | iSport International | 40 | +33.814 | 4 | 5 |
| 5 | 16 | (Italy) Giorgio Pantano | FMS International | 40 | +36.834 | 5 | 4 |
| 6 | 9 | (United Kingdom) Adam Carroll | Racing Engineering | 40 | +52.148 | 12 | 3 |
| 7 | 5 | (Argentina) José María López | Super Nova Racing | 40 | +52.990 | 26 | 2 |
| 8 | 21 | (Monaco) Clivio Piccione | DPR Direxiv | 40 | +53.919 | 16 | 1 |
| 9 | 3 | (Germany) Michael Ammermüller | Arden International | 40 | +59.478 | 19 | |
| 10 | 23 | (Spain) Sergio Hernández | Durango | 40 | +1:13.406 | 21 | |
| 11 | 10 | (Spain) Javier Villa | Racing Engineering | 40 | +1:17.475 | 22 | |
| 12 | 25 | (Spain) Félix Porteiro | Campos Racing | 40 | +1:21.736 | 20 | |
| 13 | 11 | (Brazil) Nelson Piquet Jr. | Piquet Sports | 39 | +1 Lap | 3 | |
| 14 | 15 | (France) Franck Perera | DAMS | 39 | +1 Lap | 6 | |
| 15 | 20 | (Russia) Vitaly Petrov | DPR Direxiv | 39 | +1 Lap | 23 | |
| 16 | 12 | (Brazil) Alexandre Negrão | Piquet Sports | 39 | +1 Lap | 18 | |
| 17 | 17 | (Turkey) Jason Tahincioglu | FMS International | 39 | +1 Lap | 24 | |
| 18 | 24 | (Spain) Adrián Vallés | Campos Racing | 39 | +1 Lap | 25 | |
| 19 | 1 | (France) Alexandre Prémat | ART Grand Prix | 38 | +2 Laps | 10 | 1 |
| 20 | 4 | (France) Nicolas Lapierre | Arden International | 38 | +2 Laps | 13 | |
| 21 | 19 | (Italy) Luca Filippi | BCN Competición | 38 | +2 Laps | 15 | |
| 22 | 6 | (Malaysia) Fairuz Fauzy | Super Nova Racing | 37 | +3 Laps | 17 | |
| 23 | 18 | (Japan) Hiroki Yoshimoto | BCN Competición | 36 | +4 Laps | 14 | |
| Ret | 27 | (United Arab Emirates) Andreas Zuber | Trident Racing | 1 | DNF | 9 | |
| Ret | 14 | (Italy) Ferdinando Monfardini | DAMS | 0 | DNF | 11 | |
| Ret | 22 | (Brazil) Lucas di Grassi | Durango | 0 | DNF | 7 | |

=== Sprint race ===
| Pos. | No. | Driver | Team | Laps | Time/Retired | Grid | Points |
|---|---|---|---|---|---|---|---|
| 1 | 8 | (Germany) Timo Glock | iSport International | 27 | 38:36.598 | 6 | 6 |
| 2 | 5 | (Argentina) José María López | Super Nova Racing | 27 | +1.322 | 2 | 5+1 |
| 3 | 2 | (United Kingdom) Lewis Hamilton | ART Grand Prix | 27 | +12.610 | 7 | 4 |
| 4 | 7 | (Venezuela) Ernesto Viso | iSport International | 27 | +14.680 | 5 | 3 |
| 5 | 16 | (Italy) Giorgio Pantano | FMS International | 27 | +21.351 | 4 | 2 |
| 6 | 26 | (Italy) Gianmaria Bruni | Trident Racing | 27 | +21.914 | 8 | 1 |
| 7 | 4 | (France) Nicolas Lapierre | Arden International | 27 | +22.153 | 20 | |
| 8 | 9 | (United Kingdom) Adam Carroll | Racing Engineering | 27 | +32.166 | 3 | |
| 9 | 12 | (Brazil) Alexandre Negrão | Piquet Sports | 27 | +32.402 | 16 | |
| 10 | 6 | (Malaysia) Fairuz Fauzy | Super Nova Racing | 27 | +35.370 | 22 | |
| 11 | 15 | (France) Franck Perera | DAMS | 27 | +40.957 | 14 | |
| 12 | 14 | (Italy) Ferdinando Monfardini | DAMS | 27 | +44.342 | 25 | |
| 13 | 10 | (Spain) Javier Villa | Racing Engineering | 27 | +44.586 | 11 | |
| 14 | 27 | (United Arab Emirates) Andreas Zuber | Trident Racing | 27 | +50.383 | 24 | |
| 15 | 20 | (Russia) Vitaly Petrov | DPR Direxiv | 27 | +57.102 | 15 | |
| 16 | 19 | (Italy) Luca Filippi | BCN Competición | 27 | +1:07.422 | 21 | |
| 17 | 17 | (Turkey) Jason Tahincioglu | FMS International | 27 | +1:12.159 | 17 | |
| 18 | 25 | (Spain) Félix Porteiro | Campos Racing | 27 | +1:12.570 | 12 | |
| Ret | 23 | (Spain) Sergio Hernández | Durango | 22 | DNF | 10 | |
| Ret | 3 | (Germany) Michael Ammermüller | Arden International | 20 | DNF | 9 | |
| Ret | 24 | (Spain) Adrián Vallés | Campos Racing | 20 | DNF | 18 | |
| Ret | 22 | (Brazil) Lucas di Grassi | Durango | 14 | DNF | 26 | |
| Ret | 18 | (Japan) Hiroki Yoshimoto | BCN Competición | 9 | DNF | 23 | |
| Ret | 1 | (France) Alexandre Prémat | ART Grand Prix | 9 | DNF | 19 | |
| Ret | 21 | (Monaco) Clivio Piccione | DPR Direxiv | 0 | DNF | 1 | |
| DNS | 11 | (Brazil) Nelson Piquet Jr. | Piquet Sports | 0 | Did not start | 13 | |

== Notes ==
| Previous round: 2006 Magny-Cours GP2 Series round | GP2 Series; 2006 season | Next round: 2006 Hungaroring GP2 Series round |
| Previous round: 2005 Hockenheimring GP2 Series round | Hockenheimring GP2 round | Next round: 2008 Hockenheimring GP2 Series round |
