= 2006 Istanbul Park GP2 Series round =

(Turkey) 2006 Istanbul Park GP2 round
Round details
- Round 10 of 11 rounds in the 2006 GP2 Series
- Istanbul Park
- Location: Istanbul Park, Istanbul, Turkey
- Course: Permanent racing facility 5.338 km (3.317 mi)

GP2 Series

Feature race
- Date: 26 August 2006
- Laps: 34

Pole position
Driver	(Brazil) Nelson Piquet Jr.	Piquet Sports
- Time: 1:34.741

Podium
First	(Brazil) Nelson Piquet Jr.	Piquet Sports
Second	(United Kingdom) Lewis Hamilton	ART Grand Prix
Third	(France) Alexandre Prémat	ART Grand Prix

Fastest lap
Driver	(Brazil) Nelson Piquet Jr.	Piquet Sports
- Time: 1:36.334 (on lap 26)

Sprint race
- Date: 27 August 2006
- Laps: 23

Podium
First	(United Arab Emirates) Andreas Zuber	Trident Racing
Second	(United Kingdom) Lewis Hamilton	ART Grand Prix
Third	(United Kingdom) Adam Carroll	Racing Engineering

Fastest lap
Driver	(United Kingdom) Lewis Hamilton	ART Grand Prix
- Time: 1:36.822 (on lap 23)

The 2006 Istanbul Park GP2 Series round was a GP2 Series motor race held on August 26 and 27, 2006 at Istanbul Park in Istanbul, Turkey. It was the tenth And penultimate round of the 2006 GP2 Series season. The race weekend supported the 2006 Turkish Grand Prix.

== Classification ==
=== Qualifying ===
Pos.	No.	Driver	Team	Time	Grid
1	11	(Brazil) Nelson Piquet Jr.	Piquet Sports	1:34.741	1
2	5	(Argentina) José María López	Super Nova Racing	1:34.745	2
3	16	(Italy) Giorgio Pantano	FMS International	1:35.068	3
4	1	(France) Alexandre Prémat	ART Grand Prix	1:35.151	4
5	2	(United Kingdom) Lewis Hamilton	ART Grand Prix	1:35.169	5
6	9	(United Kingdom) Adam Carroll	Racing Engineering	1:35.579	6
7	22	(Brazil) Lucas di Grassi	Durango	1:35.584	7
8	7	(Venezuela) Ernesto Viso	iSport International	1:35.672	8
9	12	(Brazil) Alexandre Negrão	Piquet Sports	1:35.675	9
10	8	(Germany) Timo Glock	iSport International	1:35.824	10
11	27	(United Arab Emirates) Andreas Zuber	Trident Racing	1:35.899	11
12	26	(Italy) Gianmaria Bruni	Trident Racing	1:36.145	12
13	21	(Monaco) Clivio Piccione	DPR Direxiv	1:36.226	13
14	15	(France) Franck Perera	DAMS	1:36.259	14
15	24	(Spain) Adrián Vallés	Campos Racing	1:36.364	15
16	14	(Italy) Ferdinando Monfardini	DAMS	1:36.367	16
17	18	(Japan) Hiroki Yoshimoto	BCN Competición	1:36.587	17
18	3	(Germany) Michael Ammermüller	Arden International	1:36.617	18
19	10	(Spain) Javier Villa	Racing Engineering	1:36.733	26
20	23	(Spain) Sergio Hernández	Durango	1:36.776	19
21	4	(France) Nicolas Lapierre	Arden International	1:36.800	20
22	25	(Spain) Félix Porteiro	Campos Racing	1:37.111	21
23	19	(Italy) Luca Filippi	BCN Competición	1:37.313	22
24	17	(Turkey) Jason Tahincioglu	FMS International	1:37.695	23
25	6	(Malaysia) Fairuz Fauzy	Super Nova Racing	1:37.878	24
26	20	(Russia) Vitaly Petrov	DPR Direxiv	No time	25

=== Feature race ===
Pos.	No.	Driver	Team	Laps	Time/Retired	Grid	Points
1	11	(Brazil) Nelson Piquet Jr.	Piquet Sports	34	55:59.398	1	10+2+1
2	2	(United Kingdom) Lewis Hamilton	ART Grand Prix	34	+17.879	5	8
3	1	(France) Alexandre Prémat	ART Grand Prix	34	+23.964	4	6
4	8	(Germany) Timo Glock	iSport International	34	+24.590	10	5
5	22	(Brazil) Lucas di Grassi	Durango	34	+36.882	7	4
6	9	(United Kingdom) Adam Carroll	Racing Engineering	34	+41.706	6	3
7	27	(United Arab Emirates) Andreas Zuber	Trident Racing	34	+42.171	11	2
8	12	(Brazil) Alexandre Negrão	Piquet Sports	34	+49.170	9	1
9	5	(Argentina) José María López	Super Nova Racing	34	+56.946	2	
10	19	(Italy) Luca Filippi	BCN Competición	34	+1:03.677	23	
11	23	(Spain) Sergio Hernández	Durango	34	+1:09.515	20	
12	15	(France) Franck Perera	DAMS	34	+1:10.378	14	
13	3	(Germany) Michael Ammermüller	Arden International	34	+1:12.278	18	
14	4	(France) Nicolas Lapierre	Arden International	34	+1:12.427	21	
15	10	(Spain) Javier Villa	Racing Engineering	34	+1:17.383	26	
16	20	(Russia) Vitaly Petrov	DPR Direxiv	34	+1:23.863	25	
17	17	(Turkey) Jason Tahincioglu	FMS International	34	+1:33.817	23	
18	14	(Italy) Ferdinando Monfardini	DAMS	32	DNF	16	
19	25	(Spain) Félix Porteiro	Campos Racing	30	DNF	21	
Ret	18	(Japan) Hiroki Yoshimoto	BCN Competición	27	DNF	17	
Ret	16	(Italy) Giorgio Pantano	FMS International	13	DNF	3	
Ret	21	(Monaco) Clivio Piccione	DPR Direxiv	11	DNF	13	
Ret	24	(Spain) Adrián Vallés	Campos Racing	9	DNF	15	
Ret	7	(Venezuela) Ernesto Viso	iSport International	9	DNF	8	
Ret	6	(Malaysia) Fairuz Fauzy	Super Nova Racing	8	DNF	24	
Ret	26	(Italy) Gianmaria Bruni	Trident Racing	6	DNF	12	

=== Sprint race ===
Pos.	No.	Driver	Team	Laps	Time/Retired	Grid	Points
1	27	(United Arab Emirates) Andreas Zuber	Trident Racing	23	37:54.990	2	6
2	2	(United Kingdom) Lewis Hamilton	ART Grand Prix	23	+2.938	7	5+1
3	9	(United Kingdom) Adam Carroll	Racing Engineering	23	+3.826	3	4
4	8	(Germany) Timo Glock	iSport International	23	+5.807	5	3
5	11	(Brazil) Nelson Piquet Jr.	Piquet Sports	23	+6.749	8	2
6	4	(France) Nicolas Lapierre	Arden International	23	+10.347	14	1
7	1	(France) Alexandre Prémat	ART Grand Prix	23	+16.693	6	
8	15	(France) Franck Perera	DAMS	23	+17.382	12	
9	22	(Brazil) Lucas di Grassi	Durango	23	+18.000	4	
10	23	(Spain) Sergio Hernández	Durango	23	+20.358	11	
11	5	(Argentina) José María López	Super Nova Racing	23	+20.610	9	
12	14	(Italy) Ferdinando Monfardini	DAMS	23	+20.977	18	
13	7	(Venezuela) Ernesto Viso	iSport International	23	+23.010	24	
14	24	(Spain) Adrián Vallés	Campos Racing	23	+23.585	23	
15	26	(Italy) Gianmaria Bruni	Trident Racing	23	+26.360	26	
16	10	(Spain) Javier Villa	Racing Engineering	23	+38.058	15	
17	17	(Turkey) Jason Tahincioglu	FMS International	23	+44.899	17	
18	20	(Russia) Vitaly Petrov	DPR Direxiv	23	+45.888	16	
19	18	(Japan) Hiroki Yoshimoto	BCN Competición	23	+1:00.623	20	
Ret	25	(Spain) Félix Porteiro	Campos Racing	3	DNF	19	
Ret	12	(Brazil) Alexandre Negrão	Piquet Sports	2	DNF	1	
Ret	6	(Malaysia) Fairuz Fauzy	Super Nova Racing	2	DNF	25	
Ret	19	(Italy) Luca Filippi	BCN Competición	0	DNF	10	
Ret	21	(Monaco) Clivio Piccione	DPR Direxiv	0	DNF	22	
Ret	16	(Italy) Giorgio Pantano	FMS International	0	DNF	21	
Ret	3	(Germany) Michael Ammermüller	Arden International	0	DNF	13	

Previous round: 2006 Hungaroring GP2 Series round	GP2 Series; 2006 season	Next round: 2006 Monza GP2 Series round
Previous round: 2005 Istanbul Park GP2 Series round	Istanbul Park GP2 round	Next round: 2007 Istanbul Park GP2 Series round
