= 2006 European GP2 Series round =

Motor racing

(Europe) 2006 European GP2 round
Round details
- Round 3 of 11 rounds in the 2006 GP2 Series
- Layout of the Nürburgring
- Location: Nürburgring, Nürburg, Germany
- Course: Permanent racing facility 4.959 km (3.081 mi)

GP2 Series

Feature race
- Date: 6 May 2006
- Laps: 35

Pole position
Driver	(Brazil) Nelson Piquet Jr.	Piquet Sports
- Time: 1:40.799

Podium
First	(United Kingdom) Lewis Hamilton	ART Grand Prix
Second	(France) Alexandre Prémat	ART Grand Prix
Third	(United Kingdom) Adam Carroll	Racing Engineering

Fastest lap
Driver	(United Kingdom) Lewis Hamilton	ART Grand Prix
- Time: 1:42.782 (on lap 14)

Sprint race
- Date: 7 May 2006
- Laps: 24

Podium
First	(United Kingdom) Lewis Hamilton	ART Grand Prix
Second	(France) Nicolas Lapierre	Arden International
Third	(Argentina) José María López	Super Nova Racing

Fastest lap
Driver	(France) Alexandre Prémat (Note: Alexandre Prémat set the fastest lap, but he started from the pitlane, so the points were given to Gianmaria Bruni.)	ART Grand Prix
- Time: 1:40.983 (on lap 22)

The 2006 European GP2 Series round were a pair of motor races held on 6 and 7 May 2006 at the Nürburgring in Nürburg as part of the GP2 Series. It was the third round of the 2006 GP2 season.

== Classification ==
=== Qualifying ===
Pos.	No.	Driver	Team	Time	Grid
1	11	(Brazil) Nelson Piquet Jr.	Piquet Sports	1:40.799	1
2	15	(France) Franck Perera	DAMS	1:41.241	2
3	2	(United Kingdom) Lewis Hamilton	ART Grand Prix	1:41.325	3
4	18	(Japan) Hiroki Yoshimoto	BCN Competicion	1:41.406	4
5	5	(Argentina) José María López	Super Nova Racing	1:41.471	5
6	1	(France) Alexandre Prémat	ART Grand Prix	1:41.478	6
7	9	(Republic of Ireland) Adam Carroll	Racing Engineering	1:41.576	7
8	4	(France) Nicolas Lapierre	Arden International	1:41.622	8
9	7	(Venezuela) E. J. Viso	iSport International	1:41.664	9
10	19	(Germany) Timo Glock	BCN Competicion	1:41.671	10
11	24	(Spain) Adrián Vallés	Campos Racing	1:41.690	11
12	3	(Germany) Michael Ammermüller	Arden International	1:41.768	12
13	21	(Monaco) Clivio Piccione	DPR Direxiv	1:41.769	13
14	26	(Italy) Gianmaria Bruni	Trident	1:41.770	14
15	27	(United Arab Emirates) Andreas Zuber	Trident	1:41.814	15
16	8	(France) Tristan Gommendy	iSport International	1:41.841	16
17	25	(Spain) Felix Porteiro	Campos Racing	1:41.913	17
18	12	(Brazil) Alexandre Sarnes Negrão	Piquet Sports	1:42.029	18
19	14	(Italy) Ferdinando Monfardini	DAMS	1:42.096	19
20	20	(France) Olivier Pla	DPR Direxiv	1:42.162	20
21	22	(Brazil) Lucas di Grassi	Durango	1:42.192	21
22	23	(Spain) Sergio Hernández	Durango	1:42.513	22
23	16	(Italy) Luca Filippi	FMS International	1:42.654	23
24	10	(Spain) Javier Villa	Racing Engineering	1:42.784	24
25	6	(Malaysia) Fairuz Fauzy	Super Nova Racing	1:43.151	25
26	17	(Turkey) Jason Tahincioğlu	FMS International	1:43.812	26

=== Feature Race ===
Pos.	No.	Driver	Team	Laps	Time/Retired	Grid	Points
1	2	(United Kingdom) Lewis Hamilton	ART Grand Prix	35	1hr 01min 26.097sec	3	11
2	1	(France) Alexandre Prémat	ART Grand Prix	35	+ 19.642 s	6	8
3	9	(Republic of Ireland) Adam Carroll	Racing Engineering	35	+ 28.756 s	5	6
4	5	(Argentina) José María López	Super Nova Racing	35	+ 29.782 s	5	5
5	4	(France) Nicolas Lapierre	Arden International	35	+ 30.073 s	8	4
6	7	(Venezuela) E. J. Viso	iSport International	35	+ 35.784 s	9	3
7	12	(Brazil) Alexandre Sarnes Negrão	Piquet Sports	35	+ 36.426 s	18	2
8	18	(Japan) Hiroki Yoshimoto	BCN Competicion	35	+ 40.197 s	4	1
9	10	(Spain) Javier Villa	Racing Engineering	35	+ 55.748 s	24	
10	3	(Germany) Michael Ammermüller	Arden International	35	+ 56.638 s	12	
11	21	(Monaco) Clivio Piccione	DPR Direxiv	35	+ 57.179 s	13	
12	23	(Spain) Sergio Hernández	Durango	35	+ 1:04.519 s	22	
13	8	(France) Tristan Gommendy	iSport International	35	+ 1:05.006 s	16	
14	27	(United Arab Emirates) Andreas Zuber	Trident	35	+ 1:16.509 s	15	
15	20	(France) Olivier Pla	DPR Direxiv	35	+ 1:17.218 s	20	
16	25	(Spain) Félix Porteiro	Super Nova Racing	35	+ 1:29.541 s	17	
17	19	(Germany) Timo Glock	BCN Competicion	35	+ 1:38.504 s	17	
18	22	(Brazil) Lucas di Grassi	Durango	34	+ 1 Lap	21	
19	6	(Malaysia) Fairuz Fauzy	Super Nova Racing	34	+ 1 Lap	25	
Ret	11	(Brazil) Nelson Piquet Jr.	Piquet Sports	30	Puncture	1	2
Ret	14	(Italy) Ferdinando Monfardini	DAMS	29	Spin	19	
Ret	26	(Italy) Gianmaria Bruni	Trident	18	Accident	14	
Ret	24	(Spain) Adrián Vallés	Campos Racing	18	Accident	11	
Ret	16	(Italy) Luca Filippi	FMS International	11	Gearbox	23	
Ret	15	(France) Franck Perera	DAMS	0	Engine	2	
DSQ	17	(Turkey) Jason Tahincioğlu	FMS International	35	Disqualified	26	
Fastest lap: Lewis Hamilton (ART Grand Prix) — 1:42.782 (112.040 mph)

=== Sprint Race ===
Pos.	No.	Driver	Team	Laps	Time/Retired	Grid	Points
1	2	(United Kingdom) Lewis Hamilton	ART Grand Prix	24	41min 18.772sec	8	6
2	4	(France) Nicolas Lapierre	Arden International	24	+ 1.034 s	4	5
3	5	(Argentina) José María López	Super Nova Racing	24	+ 3.021 s	5	4
4	18	(Japan) Hiroki Yoshimoto	BCN Competicion	24	+ 10.682 s	1	3
5	9	(Republic of Ireland) Adam Carroll	Racing Engineering	24	+ 11.646 s	6	2
6	3	(Germany) Michael Ammermüller	Arden International	24	+ 14.193 s	10	1
7	12	(Brazil) Alexandre Sarnes Negrão	Piquet Sports	24	+ 19.611 s	7	
8	21	(Monaco) Clivio Piccione	DPR Direxiv	24	+ 21.478 s	11	
9	6	(Malaysia) Fairuz Fauzy	Super Nova Racing	24	+ 37.310 s	19	
10	14	(Italy) Ferdinando Monfardini	DAMS	24	+ 37.601 s	21	
11	7	(Venezuela) E. J. Viso	iSport International	24	+ 38.266 s	3	
12	8	(France) Tristan Gommendy	iSport International	24	+ 38.899 s	13	
13	22	(Brazil) Lucas di Grassi	Durango	24	+ 42.126 s	18	
14	24	(Spain) Adrián Vallés	Campos Racing	24	+ 46.117 s	13	
15	15	(France) Franck Perera	DAMS	24	+ 50.908 s	25	
16	26	(Italy) Gianmaria Bruni	Trident	24	+ 1:17.955 s	22	1
17	1	(France) Alexandre Prémat	ART Grand Prix	24	+ 1:27.512 s	7	
18	17	(Turkey) Jason Tahincioğlu	FMS International	24	+ 1:35.744 s	26	
19	11	(Brazil) Nelson Piquet Jr.	Piquet Sports	23	+ 1 Lap	20	
20	10	(Spain) Javier Villa	Racing Engineering	23	+ 1 Lap	9	
Ret	19	(Germany) Timo Glock	BCN Competicion	13	Electrics	17	
Ret	25	(Spain) Félix Porteiro	Campos Racing	11	Gearbox	16	
Ret	16	(Italy) Luca Filippi	FMS International	6	Gearbox	24	
Ret	20	(France) Olivier Pla	DPR Direxiv	5	Suspension	15	
Ret	23	(Spain) Sergio Hernández	Durango	0	Engine	12	
Ret	27	(United Arab Emirates) Andreas Zuber	Trident	0	Accident	14	
Fastest lap: Alexandre Prémat (ART Grand Prix) — 1:40.983 (107.935 mph)

== Standings after the round ==
Drivers' Championship standings

Pos	Driver	Points
1	(Brazil) Nelson Piquet Jr.	27
2	(United Kingdom) Lewis Hamilton	26
3	(France) Nicolas Lapierre	25
4	(Venezuela) E. J. Viso	19
5	(Italy) Gianmaria Bruni	19

Teams' Championship standings

Pos	Team	Points
1	(United Kingdom) Arden International	42
2	(United Kingdom) ART Grand Prix	39
3	(Brazil) Piquet Sports	29
4	(United Kingdom) iSport International	19
5	(Italy) Trident	19

- Note: Only the top five positions are included for both sets of standings.

== Notes ==
Previous round: 2006 San Marino GP2 Series round	GP2 Series; 2006 season	Next round: 2006 Catalunya GP2 Series round
Previous round: 2005 Nürburgring GP2 Series round	Nürburgring GP2 round	Next round: 2007 Nürburgring GP2 Series round
