= 2006 Magny-Cours GP2 Series round =

(France) 2006 Magny-Cours GP2 round
Round details
- Round 7 of 11 rounds in the 2006 GP2 Series
- Location: Magny-Cours, France
- Course: Permanent racing facility 5.141 km (3.19 mi)

GP2 Series

Feature race
- Date: 15 July 2006
- Laps: 41

Pole position
| Driver | (Argentina) José María López | Super Nova Racing |
- Time: 1:23.911

Podium
| First | (Germany) Timo Glock | iSport International |
| Second | (France) Alexandre Prémat | ART Grand Prix |
| Third | (Argentina) José María López | Super Nova Racing |

Fastest lap
| Driver | (United Kingdom) Lewis Hamilton | ART Grand Prix |
- Time: 1:27.418 (on lap 5)

Sprint race
- Date: 16 July 2006
- Laps: 28

Podium
| First | (Italy) Giorgio Pantano | FMS International |
| Second | (Brazil) Nelson Piquet Jr. | Piquet Sports |
| Third | (France) Alexandre Prémat | ART Grand Prix |

Fastest lap
| Driver | (Argentina) José María López (Note: José María López did not finish the race so the points were given to Timo Glock.) | Super Nova Racing |
- Time: 1:26.513 (on lap 3)

2006 Magny-Cours GP2 Series round was a GP2 Series motor race held on 15 and 16 July, 2006 at the Circuit de Nevers Magny-Cours in Magny-Cours, France. It was the seventh race of the 2006 GP2 Series season. The race was used to support the 2006 French Grand Prix.

== Classification ==
=== Qualifying ===
| Pos. | No. | Driver | Team | Time | Grid |
|---|---|---|---|---|---|
| 1 | 5 | (Argentina) José María López | Super Nova Racing | 1:23.911 | 1 |
| 2 | 8 | (Germany) Timo Glock | iSport International | 1:24.031 | 2 |
| 3 | 16 | (Italy) Giorgio Pantano | FMS International | 1:24.057 | 3 |
| 4 | 2 | (United Kingdom) Lewis Hamilton | ART Grand Prix | 1:24.100 | 4 |
| 5 | 11 | (Brazil) Nelson Piquet Jr. | Piquet Sports | 1:24.120 | 5 |
| 6 | 9 | (United Kingdom) Adam Carroll | Racing Engineering | 1:24.291 | 6 |
| 7 | 1 | (France) Alexandre Prémat | ART Grand Prix | 1:24.334 | 7 |
| 8 | 7 | (Venezuela) Ernesto Viso | iSport International | 1:24.400 | 8 |
| 9 | 15 | (France) Franck Perera | DAMS | 1:24.455 | 9 |
| 10 | 18 | (Japan) Hiroki Yoshimoto | BCN Competición | 1:24.595 | 10 |
| 11 | 22 | (Brazil) Lucas Di Grassi | Durango | 1:24.628 | 11 |
| 12 | 26 | (Italy) Gianmaria Bruni | Trident | 1:24.670 | 12 |
| 13 | 3 | (Germany) Michael Ammermüller | Arden International | 1:24.707 | 13 |
| 14 | 14 | (Italy) Ferdinando Monfardini | DAMS | 1:24.778 | 14 |
| 15 | 12 | (Brazil) Alexandre Negrão | Piquet Sports | 1:24.948 | 15 |
| 16 | 27 | (United Arab Emirates) Andreas Zuber | Trident | 1:25.053 | 16 |
| 17 | 20 | (France) Olivier Pla | DPR Direxiv | 1:25.200 | 17 |
| 18 | 19 | (Italy) Luca Filippi | BCN Competición | 1:25.254 | 18 |
| 19 | 25 | (Spain) Félix Porteiro | Campos Racing | 1:25.454 | 19 |
| 20 | 24 | (Spain) Adrián Vallés | Campos Racing | 1:25.484 | 20 |
| 21 | 4 | (Switzerland) Neel Jani | Arden International | 1:25.569 | 21 |
| 22 | 10 | (Spain) Javier Villa | Racing Engineering | 1:25.703 | 22 |
| 23 | 6 | (Malaysia) Fairuz Fauzy | Super Nova Racing | 1:25.923 | 23 |
| 24 | 21 | (Monaco) Clivio Piccione | DPR Direxiv | 1:26.016 | 24 |
| 25 | 23 | (Spain) Sergio Hernández | Durango | 1:26.539 | 25 |
| 26 | 17 | (Turkey) Jason Tahincioglu | FMS International | 1:26.793 | 26 |

=== Feature race ===
| Pos. | No. | Driver | Team | Laps | Time/Retired | Grid | Points |
|---|---|---|---|---|---|---|---|
| 1 | 8 | (Germany) Timo Glock | iSport International | 41 | 1:01:14.385 | 2 | 10 |
| 2 | 1 | (France) Alexandre Prémat | ART Grand Prix | 41 | +5.988 | 7 | 8 |
| 3 | 5 | (Argentina) José María López | Super Nova Racing | 41 | +17.100 | 1 | 6+2 |
| 4 | 11 | (Brazil) Nelson Piquet Jr. | Piquet Sports | 41 | +24.226 | 5 | 5 |
| 5 | 12 | (Brazil) Alexandre Negrão | Piquet Sports | 41 | +27.944 | 15 | 4 |
| 6 | 16 | (Italy) Giorgio Pantano | FMS International | 41 | +31.586 | 3 | 3 |
| 7 | 22 | (Brazil) Lucas di Grassi | Durango | 41 | +34.277 | 11 | 2 |
| 8 | 14 | (Italy) Ferdinando Monfardini | DAMS | 41 | +46.130 | 14 | 1 |
| 9 | 18 | (Japan) Hiroki Yoshimoto | BCN Competición | 41 | +53.671 | 10 | |
| 10 | 7 | (Venezuela) Ernesto Viso | iSport International | 41 | +54.151 | 8 | |
| 11 | 4 | (Switzerland) Neel Jani | Arden International | 41 | +57.918 | 21 | |
| 12 | 3 | (Germany) Michael Ammermüller | Arden International | 41 | +1:02.158 | 13 | |
| 13 | 21 | (Monaco) Clivio Piccione | DPR Direxiv | 41 | +1:02.619 | 24 | |
| 14 | 23 | (Spain) Sergio Hernández | Durango | 41 | +1:03.288 | 25 | |
| 15 | 24 | (Spain) Adrián Vallés | Campos Racing | 41 | +1:05.753 | 20 | |
| 16 | 20 | (France) Olivier Pla | DPR Direxiv | 41 | +1:15.321 | 17 | |
| 17 | 10 | (Spain) Javier Villa | Racing Engineering | 41 | +1:21.238 | 22 | |
| 18 | 25 | (Spain) Félix Porteiro | Campos Racing | 41 | +1:22.011 | 19 | |
| 19 | 2 | (United Kingdom) Lewis Hamilton | ART Grand Prix | 40 | +1 Lap | 4 | 1 |
| 20 | 9 | (United Kingdom) Adam Carroll | Racing Engineering | 40 | +1 Lap | 6 | |
| Ret | 15 | (France) Franck Perera | DAMS | 34 | DNF | 9 | |
| Ret | 17 | (Turkey) Jason Tahincioglu | FMS International | 16 | DNF | 26 | |
| Ret | 6 | (Malaysia) Fairuz Fauzy | Super Nova Racing | 4 | DNF | 23 | |
| Ret | 26 | (Italy) Gianmaria Bruni | Trident Racing | 1 | DNF | 12 | |
| Ret | 19 | (Italy) Luca Filippi | BCN Competición | 1 | DNF | 18 | |
| Ret | 27 | (United Arab Emirates) Andreas Zuber | Trident Racing | 1 | DNF | 16 | |

=== Sprint race ===
| Pos. | No. | Driver | Team | Laps | Time/Retired | Grid | Points |
|---|---|---|---|---|---|---|---|
| 1 | 16 | (Italy) Giorgio Pantano | FMS International | 28 | 40:55.810 | 3 | 6 |
| 2 | 11 | (Brazil) Nelson Piquet Jr. | Piquet Sports | 28 | +0.500 | 5 | 5 |
| 3 | 1 | (France) Alexandre Prémat | ART Grand Prix | 28 | +9.667 | 7 | 4 |
| 4 | 8 | (Germany) Timo Glock | iSport International | 28 | +10.900 | 8 | 3+1 |
| 5 | 2 | (United Kingdom) Lewis Hamilton | ART Grand Prix | 28 | +12.199 | 19 | 2 |
| 6 | 22 | (Brazil) Lucas di Grassi | Durango | 28 | +17.415 | 2 | 1 |
| 7 | 4 | (Switzerland) Neel Jani | Arden International | 28 | +17.884 | 11 | |
| 8 | 3 | (Germany) Michael Ammermüller | Arden International | 28 | +29.154 | 12 | |
| 9 | 20 | (France) Olivier Pla | DPR Direxiv | 28 | +40.728 | 16 | |
| 10 | 25 | (Spain) Félix Porteiro | Campos Racing | 28 | +42.514 | 18 | |
| 11 | 23 | (Spain) Sergio Hernández | Durango | 28 | +42.968 | 14 | |
| 12 | 15 | (France) Franck Perera | DAMS | 28 | +44.900 | 21 | |
| 13 | 24 | (Spain) Adrián Vallés | Campos Racing | 28 | +45.341 | 15 | |
| 14 | 9 | (United Kingdom) Adam Carroll | Racing Engineering | 28 | +45.855 | 20 | |
| 15 | 6 | (Malaysia) Fairuz Fauzy | Super Nova Racing | 28 | +46.555 | 23 | |
| 16 | 10 | (Spain) Javier Villa | Racing Engineering | 28 | +48.782 | 17 | |
| 17 | 17 | (Turkey) Jason Tahincioglu | FMS International | 28 | +1:10.938 | 22 | |
| 18 | 27 | (United Arab Emirates) Andreas Zuber | Trident Racing | 27 | +1 Lap | 25 | |
| Ret | 26 | (Italy) Gianmaria Bruni | Trident Racing | 23 | DNF | 24 | |
| Ret | 19 | (Italy) Luca Filippi | BCN Competición | 18 | DNF | 26 | |
| Ret | 21 | (Monaco) Clivio Piccione | DPR Direxiv | 16 | DNF | 13 | |
| Ret | 5 | (Argentina) José María López | Super Nova Racing | 3 | DNF | 6 | |
| Ret | 12 | (Brazil) Alexandre Negrão | Piquet Sports | 2 | DNF | 4 | |
| Ret | 14 | (Italy) Ferdinando Monfardini | DAMS | 0 | DNF | 1 | |
| Ret | 18 | (Japan) Hiroki Yoshimoto | BCN Competición | 0 | DNF | 9 | |
| Ret | 7 | (Venezuela) Ernesto Viso | iSport International | 0 | DNF | 10 | |

== Notes ==
| Previous round: 2006 Silverstone GP2 Series round | GP2 Series; 2006 season | Next round: 2006 Hockenheimring GP2 Series round |
| Previous round: 2005 Magny-Cours GP2 Series round | Magny-Cours GP2 round | Next round: 2007 Magny-Cours GP2 Series round |
