= 2006 Valencia GP2 Series round =

(Spain) 2006 Valencia GP2 round
Round details
- Round 1 of 11 rounds in the 2006 GP2 Series
- Layout of the Circuit Ricardo Tormo
- Location: Circuit Ricardo Tormo, Valencia, Spain
- Course: Permanent road course 4.005 km (2.517 mi)

GP2 Series

Feature race
- Date: 8 April 2006
- Laps: 45

Pole position
Driver	(Brazil) Nelson Piquet Jr.	Piquet Sports
- Time: 1:17.886

Podium
First	(Brazil) Nelson Piquet Jr.	Piquet Sports
Second	(United Kingdom) Lewis Hamilton	ART Grand Prix
Third	(Spain) Adrián Vallés	Campos Racing

Fastest lap
Driver	(France) Nicolas Lapierre	Arden International
- Time: 1:22.168 (on lap 9)

Sprint race
- Date: 9 April 2006
- Laps: 30

Podium
First	(Germany) Michael Ammermüller	Arden International
Second	(Venezuela) E. J. Viso	iSport International
Third	(France) Nicolas Lapierre	Arden International

Fastest lap
Driver	(United Arab Emirates) Andreas Zuber (Note: Andreas Zuber set the fastest lap, but he started from the pitlane, so the points were given to Nelson Piquet Jr.)	Trident
- Time: 1:21.244 (on lap 3)

The 2006 Valencia GP2 Series round was a pair of motor races held on 8 and 9 April 2006 at the Circuit Ricardo Tormo in Valencia as part of the GP2 Series. It was the first round of the 2006 GP2 season.

== Classification ==
=== Qualifying ===
Pos.	No.	Driver	Team	Time	Grid
1	11	(Brazil) Nelson Piquet Jr.	Piquet Sports	1:17.886	1
2	8	(France) Tristan Gommendy	iSport International	1:18.360	2
3	2	(United Kingdom) Lewis Hamilton	ART Grand Prix	1:18.400	3
4	24	(Spain) Adrián Vallés	Campos Racing	1:18.551	4
5	7	(Venezuela) E. J. Viso	iSport International	1:18.623	5
6	5	(Argentina) José María López	Super Nova Racing	1:18.659	6
7	3	(Germany) Michael Ammermüller	Arden International	1:18.681	7
8	25	(Spain) Félix Porteiro	Campos Racing	1:18.717	8
9	1	(France) Alexandre Prémat	ART Grand Prix	1:18.752	9
10	26	(Italy) Gianmaria Bruni	Trident	1:18.772	10
11	12	(Brazil) Alexandre Sarnes Negrão	Piquet Sports	1:18.886	11
12	15	(France) Franck Perera	DAMS	1:18.890	12
13	9	(Republic of Ireland) Adam Carroll	Racing Engineering	1:18.893	13
14	27	(United Arab Emirates) Andreas Zuber	Trident	1:18.918	14
15	20	(France) Olivier Pla	DPR Direxiv	1:19.106	15
16	21	(Monaco) Clivio Piccione	DPR Direxiv	1:19.199	16
17	14	(Italy) Ferdinando Monfardini	DAMS	1:19.217	17
18	18	(Japan) Hiroki Yoshimoto	BCN Competicion	1:19.251	18
19	16	(Italy) Luca Filippi	FMS International	1:19.294	19
20	22	(Brazil) Lucas di Grassi	Durango	1:19.349	20
21	4	(France) Nicolas Lapierre	Arden International	1:19.602	21
22	6	(Malaysia) Fairuz Fauzy	Super Nova Racing	1:19.725	22
23	8	(Germany) Timo Glock	BCN Competicion	1:20.092	23
24	23	(Spain) Sergio Hernández	Durango	1:20.142	24
25	10	(Spain) Javier Villa	Racing Engineering	1:20.339	25
26	17	(Turkey) Jason Tahincioglu	FMS International	1:20.994	26

=== Feature Race ===
Pos.	No.	Driver	Team	Laps	Time/Retired	Grid	Points
1	11	(Brazil) Nelson Piquet Jr.	Piquet Sports	45	1hr 03min 14.260sec	1	12
2	2	(United Kingdom) Lewis Hamilton	ART Grand Prix	45	+ 16.655 s	3	8
3	24	(Spain) Adrián Vallés	Campos Racing	45	+ 19.490 s	5	6
4	4	(France) Nicolas Lapierre	Arden International	45	+ 31.309 s	21	6
5	5	(Argentina) José María López	Super Nova Racing	45	+ 33.526 s	6	4
6	26	(Italy) Gianmaria Bruni	Trident	45	+ 33.994 s	10	3
7	3	(Germany) Michael Ammermüller	Arden International	45	+ 35.387 s	7	2
8	7	(Venezuela) E. J. Viso	iSport International	45	+ 48.275 s	5	1
9	1	(France) Alexandre Prémat	ART Grand Prix	45	+ 53.028 s	9	
10	20	(France) Olivier Pla	DPR Direxiv	45	+ 59.040 s	15	
11	15	(France) Franck Perera	DAMS	45	+ 1:05.229 s	12	
12	14	(Italy) Ferdinando Monfardini	DAMS	45	+ 1:11.427 s	17	
13	12	(Brazil) Alexandre Sarnes Negrão	Piquet Sports	45	+ 1:11.719 s	11	
14	9	(Republic of Ireland) Adam Carroll	Racing Engineering	45	+ 1:14.261 s	13	
15	6	(Malaysia) Fairuz Fauzy	Super Nova Racing	44	+ 1 Lap	22	
16	19	(Germany) Timo Glock	BCN Competicion	44	+ 1 Lap	23	
17	22	(Brazil) Lucas di Grassi	Durango	44	+ 1 Lap	20	
18	10	(Spain) Javier Villa	Racing Engineering	44	+ 1 Lap	25	
Ret	18	(Japan) Hiroki Yoshimoto	BCN Competicion	27	Engine	18	
Ret	27	(United Arab Emirates) Andreas Zuber	Trident	23	Accident	14	
Ret	16	(Italy) Luca Filippi	FMS International	15	Gearbox	19	
Ret	25	(Spain) Félix Porteiro	Campos Racing	7	Engine	8	
Ret	23	(Spain) Sergio Hernández	Durango	4	Gearbox	24	
Ret	8	(France) Tristan Gommendy	iSport International	2	Engine	2	
Ret	21	(Monaco) Clivio Piccione	DPR Direxiv	1	Accident	16	
Ret	17	(Turkey) Jason Tahincioğlu	FMS International	0	Gearbox	26	
Fastest lap: Nicolas Lapierre (Arden International) — 1:22.168 (109.031 mph)

=== Sprint Race ===
Pos.	No.	Driver	Team	Laps	Time/Retired	Grid	Points
1	3	(Germany) Michael Ammermüller	Arden International	28	30min 44.066sec	2	6
2	7	(Venezuela) E. J. Viso	iSport International	28	+ 9.756 s	1	5
3	4	(France) Nicolas Lapierre	Arden International	28	+ 10.213 s	5	4
4	11	(Brazil) Nelson Piquet Jr.	Piquet Sports	28	+ 10.975 s	8	4
5	26	(Italy) Gianmaria Bruni	Trident	28	+ 16.537 s	3	2
6	2	(United Kingdom) Lewis Hamilton	ART Grand Prix	28	+ 18.150 s	7	1
7	12	(Brazil) Alexandre Sarnes Negrão	Piquet Sports	28	+ 32.746 s	13	
8	19	(Germany) Timo Glock	BCN Competicion	28	+ 37.391 s	16	
9	10	(Spain) Javier Villa	Racing Engineering	28	+ 44.084 s	18	
10	6	(Malaysia) Fairuz Fauzy	Super Nova Racing	28	+ 55.125 s	15	
11	8	(France) Tristan Gommendy	iSport International	28	+ 1:00.402 s	24	
12	18	(Japan) Hiroki Yoshimoto	BCN Competicion	28	+ 1:03.704 s	19	
13	27	(United Arab Emirates) Andreas Zuber	Trident	28	+ 1:06.774 s	20	
14	15	(France) Franck Perera	DAMS	28	+ 1:09.772 s	11	
15	20	(France) Olivier Pla	DPR Direxiv	28	+ 1:21.534 s	10	
16	22	(Brazil) Lucas di Grassi	Durango	27	+ 1 Lap	17	
Ret	21	(Monaco) Clivio Piccione	DPR Direxiv	24	Spun off	25	
Ret	24	(Spain) Adrián Vallés	Campos Racing	23	Accident	6	
Ret	9	(Republic of Ireland) Adam Carroll	Racing Engineering	22	Accident	14	
Ret	5	(Argentina) José María López	Super Nova Racing	22	Accident	4	
Ret	14	(Italy) Ferdinando Monfardini	DAMS	5	Engine	12	
Ret	1	(France) Alexandre Prémat	ART Grand Prix	3	Suspension	9	
Ret	16	(Italy) Luca Filippi	FMS International	0	Gearbox	21	
Ret	25	(Spain) Félix Porteiro	Campos Racing	0	Engine	22	
Ret	17	(Turkey) Jason Tahincioğlu	FMS International	0	Gearbox	26	
Ret	23	(Spain) Sergio Hernández	Durango	0	Clutch	23	
Fastest lap: Andreas Zuber (Trident) — 1:21.244 (110.272 mph)

== Standings after the round ==
Drivers' Championship standings

Pos	Driver	Points
1	(Brazil) Nelson Piquet Jr.	16
2	(France) Nicolas Lapierre	10
3	(United Kingdom) Lewis Hamilton	9
4	(Germany) Michael Ammermüller	8
5	(Venezuela) E. J. Viso	6

Teams' Championship standings

Pos	Team	Points
1	(United Kingdom) Arden International	18
2	(Brazil) Piquet Sports	16
3	(United Kingdom) ART Grand Prix	9
4=	(Spain) Campos Racing	6
4=	(United Kingdom) iSport International	6

- Note: Only the top five positions are included for both sets of standings.

== Notes ==
Previous round: 2005 Bahrain GP2 Series round	GP2 Series; 2006 season	Next round: 2006 San Marino GP2 series round
Previous round: inaugural	Valencia GP2 round	Next round: 2007 Valencia GP2 Series round
