= 2006 Monza GP2 Series round =

Motor racing competition

(Italy) 2006 Monza GP2 round
Round details
- Round 11 of 11 rounds in the 2006 GP2 Series
- Monza
- Location: Autodromo Nazionale Monza, Monza, Italy
- Course: Permanent racing facility 5.793 km (3.600 mi)

GP2 Series

Feature race
- Date: 9 September 2006
- Laps: 32

Pole position
Driver	(Brazil) Nelson Piquet Jr.	Piquet Sports
- Time: 1:30.161

Podium
First	(Italy) Giorgio Pantano	FMS International
Second	(Brazil) Nelson Piquet Jr.	Piquet Sports
Third	(United Kingdom) Lewis Hamilton	ART Grand Prix

Fastest lap
Driver	(United Kingdom) Lewis Hamilton (Note: Giorgio Pantano set the fastest lap, but Judges penalised him for ignoring the yellow flags, so the point was given to Lewis Hamilton.)	ART Grand Prix
- Time: 1:31.038 (on lap 23)

Sprint race
- Date: 10 September 2006
- Laps: 21

Podium
First	(Italy) Giorgio Pantano	FMS International
Second	(United Kingdom) Lewis Hamilton	ART Grand Prix
Third	(Monaco) Clivio Piccione	DPR Direxiv

Fastest lap
Driver	(United Kingdom) Lewis Hamilton	ART Grand Prix
- Time: 1:30.528 (on lap 17)

The 2006 Monza GP2 Series round was a GP2 Series motor race held on September 9 and 10, 2006 at the Autodromo Nazionale Monza in Monza, Italy. It was the final round of the 2006 GP2 Series season. The race weekend supported the 2006 Italian Grand Prix.

== Classification ==
=== Qualifying ===
Pos.	No.	Driver	Team	Time	Grid
1	11	(Brazil) Nelson Piquet Jr.	Piquet Sports	1:30.161	1
2	16	(Italy) Giorgio Pantano	FMS International	1:30.390	2
3	2	(United Kingdom) Lewis Hamilton	ART Grand Prix	1:30.528	3
4	9	(United Kingdom) Adam Carroll	Racing Engineering	1:30.789	4
5	1	(France) Alexandre Prémat	ART Grand Prix	1:31.031	5
6	19	(Italy) Luca Filippi	BCN Competición	1:31.071	6
7	7	(Venezuela) Ernesto Viso	iSport International	1:31.162	7
8	3	(Germany) Michael Ammermüller	Arden International	1:31.212	8
9	15	(France) Franck Perera	DAMS	1:31.273	9
10	24	(Spain) Adrián Vallés	Campos Racing	1:31.288	10
11	8	(Germany) Timo Glock	iSport International	1:31.302	11
12	26	(Italy) Gianmaria Bruni	Trident	1:31.357	12
13	25	(Spain) Félix Porteiro	Campos Racing	1:31.358	13
14	5	(Argentina) José María López	Super Nova Racing	1:31.479	14
15	21	(Monaco) Clivio Piccione	DPR Direxiv	1:31.510	15
16	12	(Brazil) Alexandre Negrão	Piquet Sports	1:31.664	16
17	23	(Spain) Sergio Hernández	Durango	1:31.685	17
18	27	(United Arab Emirates) Andreas Zuber	Trident	1:31.818	18
19	4	(France) Nicolas Lapierre	Arden International	1:31.870	19
20	18	(Japan) Hiroki Yoshimoto	BCN Competición	1:31.888	20
21	22	(Brazil) Lucas di Grassi	Durango	1:31.934	21
22	10	(Spain) Javier Villa	Racing Engineering	1:32.195	22
23	14	(Italy) Ferdinando Monfardini	DAMS	1:32.253	23
24	20	(Russia) Vitaly Petrov	DPR Direxiv	1:32.351	24
25	6	(Malaysia) Fairuz Fauzy	Super Nova Racing	1:32.584	25
26	17	(Turkey) Jason Tahincioglu	FMS International	1:33.337	26

=== Feature race ===
Pos.	No.	Driver	Team	Laps	Time/Retired	Grid	Points
1	16	(Italy) Giorgio Pantano	FMS International	32	51:31.171	2	10
2	11	(Brazil) Nelson Piquet Jr.	Piquet Sports	32	+5.054	1	8+2
3	2	(United Kingdom) Lewis Hamilton	ART Grand Prix	32	+6.887	3	6+1
4	19	(Italy) Luca Filippi	BCN Competición	32	+28.630	6	5
5	1	(France) Alexandre Prémat	ART Grand Prix	32	+32.882	5	4
6	4	(France) Nicolas Lapierre	Arden International	32	+39.285	19	3
7	21	(Monaco) Clivio Piccione	DPR Direxiv	32	+40.656	15	2
8	18	(Japan) Hiroki Yoshimoto	BCN Competición	32	+43.361	20	1
9	10	(Spain) Javier Villa	Racing Engineering	32	+57.004	22	
10	22	(Brazil) Lucas di Grassi	Durango	32	+1:27.040	21	
11	17	(Turkey) Jason Tahincioglu	FMS International	31	+1 Lap	26	
12	3	(Germany) Michael Ammermüller	Arden International	31	+1 Lap	8	
13	23	(Spain) Sergio Hernández	Durango	31	+1 Lap	17	
14	6	(Malaysia) Fairuz Fauzy	Super Nova Racing	31	+1 Lap	25	
15	15	(France) Franck Perera	DAMS	30	+2 Laps	9	
Ret	5	(Argentina) José María López	Super Nova Racing	19	DNF	14	
Ret	20	(Russia) Vitaly Petrov	DPR Direxiv	18	DNF	24	
Ret	8	(Germany) Timo Glock	iSport International	17	DNF	11	
Ret	24	(Spain) Adrián Vallés	Campos Racing	17	DNF	10	
Ret	26	(Italy) Gianmaria Bruni	Trident Racing	15	DNF	12	
Ret	14	(Italy) Ferdinando Monfardini	DAMS	15	DNF	23	
Ret	9	(United Kingdom) Adam Carroll	Racing Engineering	10	DNF	4	
Ret	25	(Spain) Félix Porteiro	Campos Racing	8	DNF	13	
Ret	7	(Venezuela) Ernesto Viso	iSport International	0	DNF	7	
Ret	12	(Brazil) Alexandre Negrão	Piquet Sports	0	DNF	16	
Ret	27	(United Arab Emirates) Andreas Zuber	Trident Racing	0	DNF	18	

=== Sprint race ===
Pos.	No.	Driver	Team	Laps	Time/Retired	Grid	Points
1	16	(Italy) Giorgio Pantano	FMS International	21	32:08.597	8	6
2	2	(United Kingdom) Lewis Hamilton	ART Grand Prix	21	+0.411	6	5+1
3	21	(Monaco) Clivio Piccione	DPR Direxiv	21	+14.075	2	4
4	4	(France) Nicolas Lapierre	Arden International	21	+21.206	3	3
5	18	(Japan) Hiroki Yoshimoto	BCN Competición	21	+21.680	1	2
6	11	(Brazil) Nelson Piquet Jr.	Piquet Sports	21	+22.029	7	1
7	19	(Italy) Luca Filippi	BCN Competición	21	+22.548	5	
8	7	(Venezuela) Ernesto Viso	iSport International	21	+28.507	24	
9	26	(Italy) Gianmaria Bruni	Trident Racing	21	+43.967	20	
10	6	(Malaysia) Fairuz Fauzy	Super Nova Racing	21	+44.845	14	
11	24	(Spain) Adrián Vallés	Campos Racing	21	+45.523	19	
12	20	(Russia) Vitaly Petrov	DPR Direxiv	21	+45.781	17	
13	17	(Turkey) Jason Tahincioglu	FMS International	21	+1:01.274	11	
14	22	(Brazil) Lucas di Grassi	Durango	21	+1:08.214	10	
15	15	(France) Franck Perera	DAMS	19	+2 Laps	15	
Ret	5	(Argentina) José María López	Super Nova Racing	17	DNF	16	
NC	27	(United Arab Emirates) Andreas Zuber	Trident Racing	17	+4 Laps	26	
NC	25	(Spain) Félix Porteiro	Campos Racing	16	+5 Laps	23	
Ret	1	(France) Alexandre Prémat	ART Grand Prix	15	DNF	4	
Ret	23	(Spain) Sergio Hernández	Durango	12	DNF	13	
Ret	9	(United Kingdom) Adam Carroll	Racing Engineering	5	DNF	22	
Ret	12	(Brazil) Alexandre Negrão	Piquet Sports	4	DNF	25	
Ret	14	(Italy) Ferdinando Monfardini	DAMS	4	DNF	21	
Ret	3	(Germany) Michael Ammermüller	Arden International	2	DNF	12	
Ret	10	(Spain) Javier Villa	Racing Engineering	1	DNF	9	
DNS	8	(Germany) Timo Glock	iSport International	0	Did not start	18	

== Notes ==
Previous round: 2006 Istanbul Park GP2 Series round	GP2 Series; 2006 season	Next round: 2007 Bahrain GP2 Series round
Previous round: 2005 Monza GP2 Series round	Monza GP2 round	Next round: 2007 Monza GP2 Series round
