= 2006 Hungaroring GP2 Series round =

2006 Hungary GP2 round
Round details
- Round 9 of 11 rounds in the 2006 GP2 Series
- The Hungaroring layout
- Location: Hungaroring, Mogyoród, Pest, Hungary
- Course: Permanent racing facility 4.381 km (2.722 mi)

GP2 Series

Feature race
- Date: 5 August 2006
- Laps: 42

Pole position
| Driver | (Brazil) Nelson Piquet Jr. | Piquet Sports |
- Time: 1:29.464

Podium
| First | (Brazil) Nelson Piquet Jr. | Piquet Sports |
| Second | (Germany) Timo Glock | iSport International |
| Third | (Italy) Giorgio Pantano | FMS International |

Fastest lap
| Driver | (Brazil) Nelson Piquet Jr. | Piquet Sports |
- Time: 1:30.711 (on lap 21)

Sprint race
- Date: 6 August 2006
- Laps: 23

Podium
| First | (Brazil) Nelson Piquet Jr. | Piquet Sports |
| Second | (United Kingdom) Lewis Hamilton | ART Grand Prix |
| Third | (France) Alexandre Prémat | ART Grand Prix |

Fastest lap
| Driver | (Brazil) Nelson Piquet Jr. | Piquet Sports |
- Time: 1:51.716 (on lap 13)

The 2006 Hungaroring GP2 Series round were a pair of motor races held on 5 and 6 August 2006 at the Hungaroring in Mogyoród, Pest, Hungary as part of the GP2 Series. It was the ninth round of the 2006 GP2 Series season. The race weekend supported the 2006 Hungarian Grand Prix.

== Classification ==
=== Qualifying ===
| Pos. | No. | Driver | Team | Time | Grid |
|---|---|---|---|---|---|
| 1 | 11 | (Brazil) Nelson Piquet Jr. | Piquet Sports | 1:29.464 | 1 |
| 2 | 5 | (Argentina) José María López | Super Nova Racing | 1:30.081 | 2 |
| 3 | 3 | (Germany) Michael Ammermüller | Arden International | 1:30.274 | 3 |
| 4 | 9 | (United Kingdom) Adam Carroll | Racing Engineering | 1:30.289 | 4 |
| 5 | 1 | (France) Alexandre Prémat | ART Grand Prix | 1:30.306 | 15 |
| 6 | 26 | (Italy) Gianmaria Bruni | Trident | 1:30.324 | 5 |
| 7 | 15 | (France) Franck Perera | DAMS | 1:30.338 | 6 |
| 8 | 12 | (Brazil) Alexandre Negrão | Piquet Sports | 1:30.368 | 7 |
| 9 | 8 | (Germany) Timo Glock | iSport International | 1:30.467 | 8 |
| 10 | 16 | (Italy) Giorgio Pantano | FMS International | 1:30.485 | 9 |
| 11 | 7 | (Venezuela) Ernesto Viso | iSport International | 1:30.502 | 10 |
| 12 | 14 | (Italy) Ferdinando Monfardini | DAMS | 1:30.668 | 11 |
| 13 | 21 | (Monaco) Clivio Piccione | DPR Direxiv | 1:30.862 | 12 |
| 14 | 24 | (Spain) Adrián Vallés | Campos Racing | 1:30.924 | 13 |
| 15 | 4 | (France) Nicolas Lapierre | Arden International | 1:30.951 | 14 |
| 16 | 22 | (Brazil) Lucas di Grassi | Durango | 1:30.978 | 16 |
| 17 | 18 | (Japan) Hiroki Yoshimoto | BCN Competición | 1:31.025 | 17 |
| 18 | 23 | (Spain) Sergio Hernández | Durango | 1:31.091 | 18 |
| 19 | 27 | (United Arab Emirates) Andreas Zuber | Trident | 1:31.419 | 19 |
| 20 | 10 | (Spain) Javier Villa | Racing Engineering | 1:31.537 | 20 |
| 21 | 23 | (Spain) Félix Porteiro | Campos Racing | 1:31.630 | 21 |
| 22 | 17 | (Turkey) Jason Tahincioglu | FMS International | 1:31.799 | 22 |
| 23 | 20 | (Russia) Vitaly Petrov | DPR Direxiv | 1:31.915 | 23 |
| 24 | 19 | (Italy) Luca Filippi | BCN Competición | 1:32.293 | 24 |
| 25 | 6 | (Malaysia) Fairuz Fauzy | Super Nova Racing | 1:32.592 | 25 |
| 26 | 2 | (United Kingdom) Lewis Hamilton | ART Grand Prix | No time | 26 |

- Alexandre Prémat was given a ten-place penalty after for causing accident with Hiroki Yoshimoto in the sprint race in Hockenheim.

=== Feature race ===
| Pos. | No. | Driver | Team | Laps | Time/Retired | Grid | Points |
|---|---|---|---|---|---|---|---|
| 1 | 11 | (Brazil) Nelson Piquet Jr. | Piquet Sports | 42 | 1:05:13.884 | 1 | 10+2+1 |
| 2 | 8 | (Germany) Timo Glock | iSport International | 42 | +32.795 | 8 | 8 |
| 3 | 16 | (Italy) Giorgio Pantano | FMS International | 42 | +34.019 | 9 | 6 |
| 4 | 7 | (Venezuela) Ernesto Viso | iSport International | 42 | +39.883 | 10 | 5 |
| 5 | 12 | (Brazil) Alexandre Negrão | Piquet Sports | 42 | +40.509 | 7 | 4 |
| 6 | 1 | (France) Alexandre Prémat | ART Grand Prix | 42 | +54.795 | 15 | 3 |
| 7 | 9 | (United Kingdom) Adam Carroll | Racing Engineering | 42 | +56.075 | 4 | 2 |
| 8 | 5 | (Argentina) José María López | Super Nova Racing | 42 | +58.090 | 2 | 1 |
| 9 | 15 | (France) Franck Perera | DAMS | 42 | +58.666 | 6 | |
| 10 | 2 | (United Kingdom) Lewis Hamilton | ART Grand Prix | 42 | +1:13.818 | 26 | |
| 11 | 14 | (Italy) Ferdinando Monfardini | DAMS | 42 | +1:20.261 | 11 | |
| 12 | 19 | (Italy) Luca Filippi | BCN Competición | 41 | +1 Lap | 24 | |
| 13 | 27 | (United Arab Emirates) Andreas Zuber | Trident Racing | 41 | +1 Lap | 19 | |
| 14 | 22 | (Brazil) Lucas di Grassi | Durango | 41 | +1 Lap | 16 | |
| 15 | 20 | (Russia) Vitaly Petrov | DPR Direxiv | 41 | +1 Lap | 23 | |
| 16 | 6 | (Malaysia) Fairuz Fauzy | Super Nova Racing | 41 | +1 Lap | 25 | |
| Ret | 24 | (Spain) Adrián Vallés | Campos Racing | 26 | DNF | 13 | |
| Ret | 26 | (Italy) Gianmaria Bruni | Trident Racing | 25 | DNF | 5 | |
| Ret | 23 | (Spain) Sergio Hernández | Durango | 25 | DNF | 18 | |
| Ret | 17 | (Turkey) Jason Tahincioglu | FMS International | 22 | DNF | 22 | |
| Ret | 18 | (Japan) Hiroki Yoshimoto | BCN Competición | 17 | DNF | 17 | |
| Ret | 4 | (France) Nicolas Lapierre | Arden International | 17 | DNF | 14 | |
| Ret | 10 | (Spain) Javier Villa | Racing Engineering | 16 | DNF | 20 | |
| Ret | 23 | (Spain) Félix Porteiro | Campos Racing | 16 | DNF | 21 | |
| Ret | 21 | (Monaco) Clivio Piccione | DPR Direxiv | 7 | DNF | 12 | |
| Ret | 3 | (Germany) Michael Ammermüller | Arden International | 0 | DNF | 3 | |

=== Sprint race ===
| Pos. | No. | Driver | Team | Laps | Time/Retired | Grid | Points |
|---|---|---|---|---|---|---|---|
| 1 | 11 | (Brazil) Nelson Piquet Jr. | Piquet Sports | 23 | 45:59.804 | 8 | 6+1 |
| 2 | 2 | (United Kingdom) Lewis Hamilton | ART Grand Prix | 23 | +12.921 | 10 | 5 |
| 3 | 1 | (France) Alexandre Prémat | ART Grand Prix | 23 | +26.202 | 3 | 4 |
| 4 | 7 | (Venezuela) Ernesto Viso | iSport International | 23 | +26.872 | 5 | 3 |
| 5 | 8 | (Germany) Timo Glock | iSport International | 23 | +27.231 | 7 | 2 |
| 6 | 14 | (Italy) Ferdinando Monfardini | DAMS | 23 | +41.114 | 11 | 1 |
| 7 | 24 | (Spain) Adrián Vallés | Campos Racing | 23 | +47.508 | 17 | |
| 8 | 26 | (Italy) Gianmaria Bruni | Trident | 23 | +50.314 | 18 | |
| 9 | 27 | (United Arab Emirates) Andreas Zuber | Trident | 23 | +55.918 | 13 | |
| 10 | 20 | (Russia) Vitaly Petrov | DPR Direxiv | 23 | +1:03.711 | 15 | |
| 11 | 3 | (Germany) Michael Ammermüller | Arden International | 23 | +1:06.434 | 26 | |
| 12 | 23 | (Spain) Félix Porteiro | Campos Racing | 23 | +1:35.075 | 24 | |
| 13 | 16 | (Italy) Giorgio Pantano | FMS International | 23 | +1:50.317 | 6 | |
| 14 | 17 | (Turkey) Jason Tahincioglu | FMS International | 22 | +1 Lap | 20 | |
| Ret | 10 | (Spain) Javier Villa | Racing Engineering | 21 | DNF | 23 | |
| Ret | 18 | (Japan) Hiroki Yoshimoto | BCN Competición | 18 | DNF | 21 | |
| Ret | 23 | (Spain) Sergio Hernández | Durango | 17 | DNF | 19 | |
| Ret | 4 | (France) Nicolas Lapierre | Arden International | 12 | DNF | 22 | |
| Ret | 9 | (United Kingdom) Adam Carroll | Racing Engineering | 12 | DNF | 2 | |
| Ret | 22 | (Brazil) Lucas di Grassi | Durango | 10 | DNF | 14 | |
| Ret | 15 | (France) Franck Perera | DAMS | 8 | DNF | 9 | |
| Ret | 6 | (Malaysia) Fairuz Fauzy | Super Nova Racing | 7 | DNF | 16 | |
| Ret | 21 | (Monaco) Clivio Piccione | DPR Direxiv | 5 | DNF | 25 | |
| Ret | 12 | (Brazil) Alexandre Negrão | Piquet Sports | 4 | DNF | 4 | |
| Ret | 5 | (Argentina) José María López | Super Nova Racing | 4 | DNF | 1 | |
| Ret | 19 | (Italy) Luca Filippi | BCN Competición | 4 | DNF | 12 | |

| Previous round: 2006 Hockenheimring GP2 Series round | GP2 Series; 2006 season | Next round: 2006 Istanbul Park GP2 Series round |
| Previous round: 2005 Hungaroring GP2 Series round | Hungaroring GP2 round | Next round: 2007 Hungaroring GP2 Series round |
