= 2006 Silverstone GP2 Series round =

2006 GP2 race held in the United Kingdom

(United Kingdom) 2006 Silverstone GP2 round
Round details
- Round 6 of 11 rounds in the 2006 GP2 Series
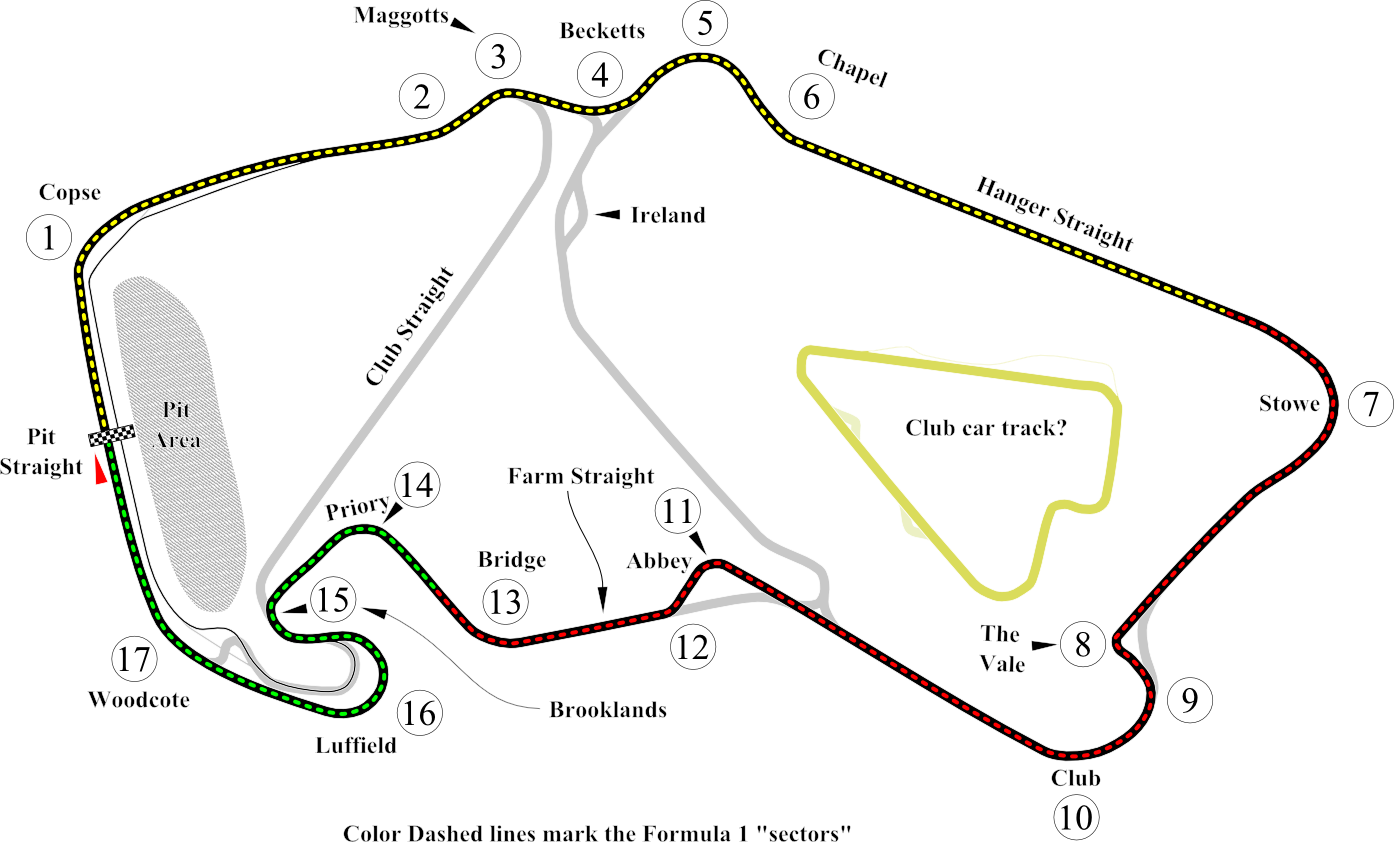
- Silverstone Circuit
- Location: Silverstone Circuit, Northamptonshire and Buckinghamshire, England
- Course: Permanent racing circuit 5.141 km (3.194 mi)

GP2 Series

Feature race
- Date: 10 June 2006
- Laps: 36

Pole position
Driver	(United Kingdom) Adam Carroll	Racing Engineering
- Time: 1:29.104

Podium
First	(United Kingdom) Lewis Hamilton	ART Grand Prix
Second	(Germany) Timo Glock	iSport International
Third	(United Kingdom) Adam Carroll	Racing Engineering

Fastest lap
Driver	(United Kingdom) Lewis Hamilton	ART Grand Prix
- Time: 1:32.505 (on lap 35)

Sprint race
- Date: 11 June 2006
- Laps: 23

Podium
First	(United Kingdom) Lewis Hamilton	ART Grand Prix
Second	(United Kingdom) Adam Carroll	Racing Engineering
Third	(Monaco) Clivio Piccione	DPR Direxiv

Fastest lap
Driver	(United Kingdom) Lewis Hamilton	ART Grand Prix
- Time: 1:31.313 (on lap 16)

The 2006 Silverstone GP2 Series round was a GP2 Series motor race held on 10 and 11 June 2006 at Silverstone Circuit, United Kingdom. It was the sixth round of the 2006 GP2 Series season. The race weekend supported the 2006 British Grand Prix.

== Classification ==
=== Qualifying ===
Pos.	No.	Driver	Team	Time	Grid
1	9	(United Kingdom) Adam Carroll	Racing Engineering	1:29.104	1
2	2	(United Kingdom) Lewis Hamilton	ART Grand Prix	1:29.108	2
3	1	(France) Alexandre Prémat	ART Grand Prix	1:29.134	3
4	11	(Brazil) Nelson Piquet Jr.	Piquet Sports	1:29.160	4
5	8	(Germany) Timo Glock	iSport International	1:29.300	5
6	27	(United Arab Emirates) Andreas Zuber	Trident	1:29.400	6
7	22	(Brazil) Lucas di Grassi	Durango	1:29.404	7
8	26	(Italy) Gianmaria Bruni	Trident	1:29.546	8
9	21	(Monaco) Clivio Piccione	DPR Direxiv	1:29.548	9
10	16	(Italy) Giorgio Pantano	FMS International	1:29.729	10
11	3	(Germany) Michael Ammermüller	Arden International	1:29.869	11
12	14	(Italy) Ferdinando Monfardini	DAMS	1:29.890	12
13	15	(France) Franck Perera	DAMS	1:29.903	13
14	7	(Venezuela) Ernesto Viso	iSport International	1:29.937	14
15	24	(Spain) Adrián Vallés	Campos Racing	1:30.351	15
16	18	(Japan) Hiroki Yoshimoto	BCN Competición	1:30.484	16
17	12	(Brazil) Alexandre Negrão	Piquet Sports	1:30.526	17
18	5	(Argentina) José María López	Super Nova Racing	1:31.097	18
19	10	(Spain) Javier Villa	Racing Engineering	1:31.178	19
20	20	(United Kingdom) Mike Conway	DPR Direxiv	1:31.309	20
21	23	(Spain) Sergio Hernández	Durango	1:31.321	21
22	4	(Switzerland) Neel Jani	Arden International	1:31.334	22
23	6	(Malaysia) Fairuz Fauzy	Super Nova Racing	1:31.506	23
24	25	(Spain) Félix Porteiro	Campos Racing	1:31.624	24
25	19	(Italy) Luca Filippi	BCN Competición	1:31.836	25
26	17	(Turkey) Jason Tahincioglu	FMS International	1:33.834	26

=== Feature race ===
Pos.	No.	Driver	Team	Laps	Time/Retired	Grid	Points
1	2	(United Kingdom) Lewis Hamilton	ART Grand Prix	36	1:00:53.888	2	10+1
2	8	(Germany) Timo Glock	iSport International	36	+5.014	5	8
3	9	(United Kingdom) Adam Carroll	Racing Engineering	36	+6.145	1	6+2
4	11	(Brazil) Nelson Piquet Jr.	Piquet Sports	36	+6.436	4	5
5	16	(Italy) Giorgio Pantano	FMS International	36	+8.728	10	4
6	1	(France) Alexandre Prémat	ART Grand Prix	36	+12.985	3	3
7	21	(Monaco) Clivio Piccione	DPR Direxiv	36	+15.146	9	2
8	25	(Spain) Félix Porteiro	Campos Racing	36	+17.088	24	1
9	24	(Spain) Adrián Vallés	Campos Racing	36	+17.959	15	
10	20	(United Kingdom) Mike Conway	DPR Direxiv	36	+23.061	20	
11	6	(Malaysia) Fairuz Fauzy	Super Nova Racing	36	+25.174	23	
12	17	(Turkey) Jason Tahincioglu	FMS International	36	+36.333	26	
13	10	(Spain) Javier Villa	Racing Engineering	36	+55.030	19	
Ret	27	(United Arab Emirates) Andreas Zuber	Trident Racing	30	DNF	6	
Ret	19	(Italy) Luca Filippi	BCN Competición	29	DNF	25	
NC	4	(Switzerland) Neel Jani	Arden International	28	+8 Laps	22	
Ret	26	(Italy) Gianmaria Bruni	Trident Racing	26	DNF	8	
Ret	18	(Japan) Hiroki Yoshimoto	BCN Competición	24	DNF	16	
Ret	14	(Italy) Ferdinando Monfardini	DAMS	20	DNF	12	
Ret	7	(Venezuela) Ernesto Viso	iSport International	18	DNF	14	
Ret	22	(Brazil) Lucas di Grassi	Durango	16	DNF	7	
Ret	3	(Germany) Michael Ammermüller	Arden International	7	DNF	11	
Ret	12	(Brazil) Alexandre Negrão	Piquet Sports	1	DNF	17	
Ret	15	(France) Franck Perera	DAMS	0	DNF	13	
Ret	5	(Argentina) José María López	Super Nova Racing	0	DNF	18	
DSQ	23	(Spain) Sergio Hernández	Durango	39	Disqualified	21	

=== Sprint race ===
Pos.	No.	Driver	Team	Laps	Time/Retired	Grid	Points
1	2	(United Kingdom) Lewis Hamilton	ART Grand Prix	23	37:27.225	8	6+1
2	9	(United Kingdom) Adam Carroll	Racing Engineering	23	+10.040	6	5
3	21	(Monaco) Clivio Piccione	DPR Direxiv	23	+11.025	2	4
4	16	(Italy) Giorgio Pantano	FMS International	23	+11.896	4	3
5	11	(Brazil) Nelson Piquet Jr.	Piquet Sports	23	+12.106	5	2
6	8	(Germany) Timo Glock	iSport International	23	+15.133	7	1
7	6	(Malaysia) Fairuz Fauzy	Super Nova Racing	23	+19.572	11	
8	7	(Venezuela) Ernesto Viso	iSport International	23	+21.268	19	
9	19	(Italy) Luca Filippi	BCN Competición	23	+22.580	15	
10	15	(France) Franck Perera	DAMS	23	+22.888	22	
11	20	(United Kingdom) Mike Conway	DPR Direxiv	23	+23.778	10	
12	12	(Brazil) Alexandre Negrão	Piquet Sports	23	+24.885	21	
13	10	(Spain) Javier Villa	Racing Engineering	23	+29.711	13	
14	5	(Argentina) José María López	Super Nova Racing	23	+31.982	23	
15	26	(Italy) Gianmaria Bruni	Trident Racing	23	+36.412	17	
16	17	(Turkey) Jason Tahincioglu	FMS International	23	+54.863	12	
17	18	(Japan) Hiroki Yoshimoto	BCN Competición	21	+2 Laps	18	
Ret	24	(Spain) Adrián Vallés	Campos Racing	13	DNF	9	
Ret	4	(Switzerland) Neel Jani	Arden International	5	DNF	16	
Ret	3	(Germany) Michael Ammermüller	Arden International	5	DNF	20	
Ret	1	(France) Alexandre Prémat	ART Grand Prix	2	DNF	3	
Ret	27	(United Arab Emirates) Andreas Zuber	Trident	0	DNF	14	
DSQ	25	(Spain) Félix Porteiro	Campos Racing	23	Disqualified	1	
DNS	14	(Italy) Ferdinando Monfardini	DAMS	0	Did not start	26	
EX	22	(Brazil) Lucas di Grassi	Durango	0	Excluded	24	
EX	23	(Spain) Sergio Hernández	Durango	0	Excluded	25	

Previous round: 2006 Monaco GP2 Series round	GP2 Series; 2006 season	Next round: 2006 Magny-Cours GP2 Series round
Previous round: 2005 Silverstone GP2 Series round	Silverstone GP2 round	Next round: 2007 Silverstone GP2 Series round
