= 2006 GP2 Series =

Season of Formula One feeder championship

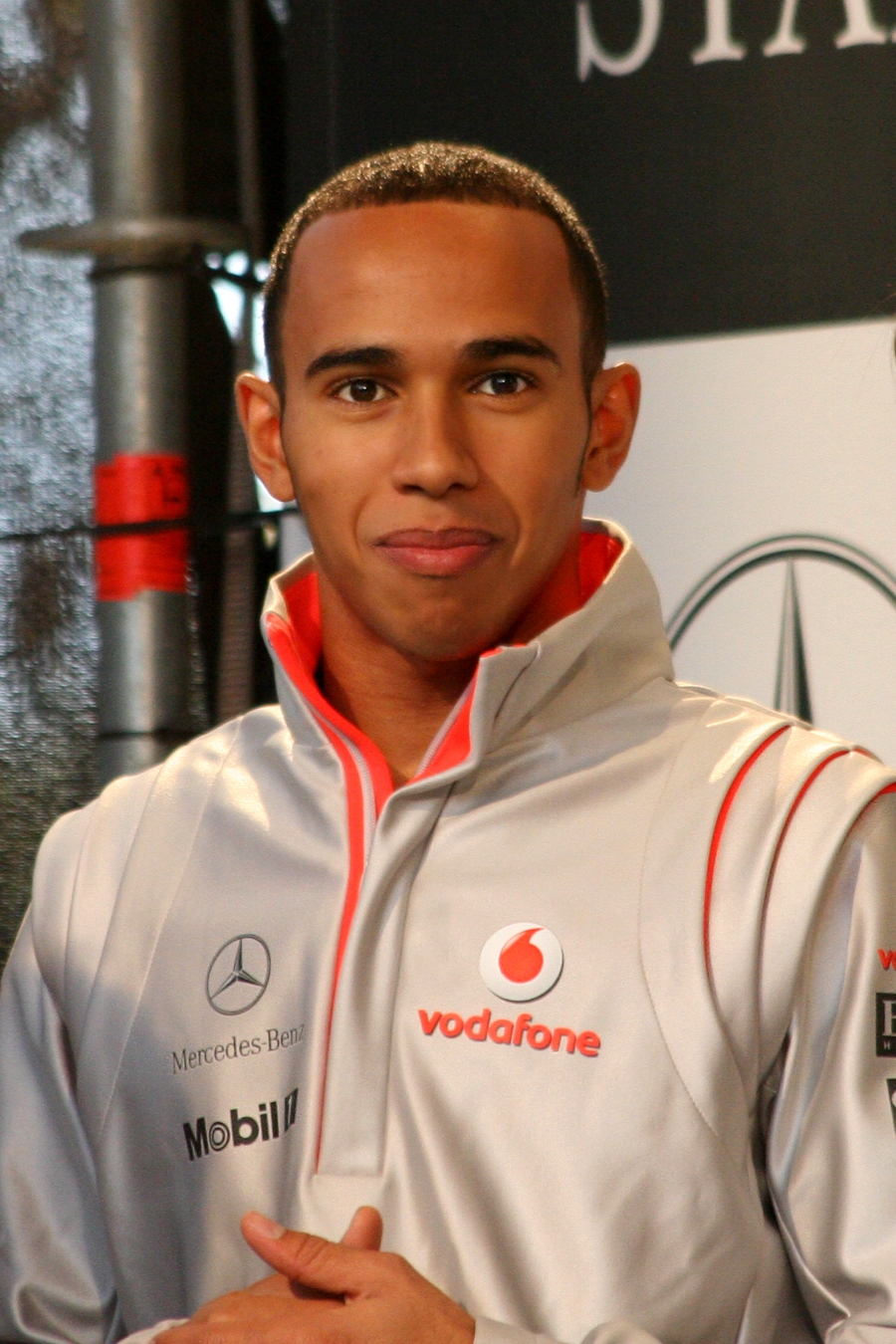
Lewis Hamilton (pictured in 2007), won the championship.

The 2006 GP2 Series season was the second season of the Formula One feeder championship GP2 Series. The season began at Circuit de Valencia, Spain on 8 April 2006 and ended in Monza, Italy on 10 September 2006. The championship was won by ART Grand Prix driver Lewis Hamilton, over Piquet Sports driver Nelson Piquet Jr.

== 2006 GP2 car modifications ==
=== Chassis ===
The 2006 specification GP2 Car was designed by Dallara Automobili. The 2006 GP2 car featured a biplane rear wing, with the triplane rear wing used in 2005 only to be used at the Monaco race. The front upper and lower wishbones were reinforced, as were the front and rear suspension uprights.

=== Engine ===
The 4 litre V8 engine featured internal, cartographic and software upgrades designed to improve performance and fuel consumption.

=== Gearbox ===
The 2006 gearbox was manufactured by GearTek, and featured an 8 position barrel, with ratchet body and software upgrades, as well as a new transverse shafts fixing system designed to facilitate improved gear selection.

=== Tyres ===
The tyres supplied by Bridgestone for the 2006 season were full-slick, not featuring the four-line grooved slick seen in the 2005 season. Bridgestone supplied a soft, medium, and hard compound tyre, with the tyre choice being made by Bridgestone and the GP2 Series prior to each event. The wet specification tyre remained the same as 2005.

=== Other parts ===
Brembo supplied a new development of monobloc brake calipers and disc bells, which were exclusive to GP2. The car also featured internal cooling upgrades, a new water radiator, radiator duct, oil and water heat exchanger, modified oil degasser, new oil and water pipes and new heat exchanger fixing brackets.

=== Sporting regulations changes ===
The only change to the sporting regulations for the 2006 season was that drivers would only be awarded a single point for fastest lap in a race, rather than the two points that were awarded in 2005. The driver also had to start the race from his allocated grid position to be eligible to claim the fastest lap.

== Season summary ==
Nelson Piquet Jr. won the first race at Valencia ahead of two rookies, Lewis Hamilton and Adrián Vallés. The latter failed to score in the rest of the season apart from one point for fastest lap at Barcelona. In a sprint race, Vallés was involved in a collision with Adam Carroll who rolled multiple times. The sprint race was won by Michael Ammermüller who had a promising start to the season but failed to score during last six weekends.

Gianmaria Bruni and Ernesto Viso then shared victories at Imola, where Hamilton failed to score, after being black-flagged in the feature race and therefore starting the sprint race from back of the grid. Hamilton won both races at Nürburgring, after Piquet took pole position but had a big crash following car failure in the feature race. He also failed to score in the sprint.

Hamilton was on course to win feature race at Barcelona, but he collided with his teammate Alexandre Prémat on the last lap. The Frenchman went on to win with Hamilton second. Viso took his second victory of the season by winning the sprint. Hamilton then won three races in a row, including at Monaco where Nicolas Lapierre and Olivier Pla were injured and did not start. At his home circuit in Silverstone, Hamilton won the feature and then the sprint, where he overtook Clivio Piccione and Piquet in one move.

There were few notable driver changes during the early season. Giorgio Pantano returned to the series with after missing the first three rounds and Timo Glock moved from BCN to iSport between the Monaco and British rounds. Both were serious contenders for race wins for the rest of the season and they shared victories at Magny-Cours. Glock also won at Hockenheim after overtaking José María López on the final lap.

At this point, Hamilton had a 26-point lead over Piquet, but the Brazilian bounced back with a perfect weekend at Hungary, taking pole, two wins and two fastest laps. Hamilton spun in qualifying and started the feature race from back of the grid. He failed to score there but took second place in the wet Sunday sprint.

Piquet's form continued in Turkey, where he won the feature race from pole. Hamilton was second, and in the sprint, he recovered from an early spin to take second place, while Piquet had to settle for fifth. Andreas Zuber took advantage of his front row starting position and won the race.

Hamilton led by ten points before final weekend in Monza. Piquet cut the lead to eight by taking pole. Pantano beat both of them in the feature race and set the fastest lap as well. Piquet finished second and Hamilton third, meaning that the championship would be decided in final race. However, Pantano was deemed to have ignored yellow flags on his fastest lap so that time was disallowed, giving a point to Hamilton who now clinched the title. Pantano made a fantastic start in the sprint and went from 8th to 1st before first corner, and went on to win the race. Hamilton followed and took 2nd, beating Piquet by 12 points in the end.

== Teams and drivers ==
All of the teams used the Dallara GP2/05 chassis with Renault-badged 4.0 litre (244 cu in) naturally-aspirated Mecachrome V8 engines order and with tyres supplied by Bridgestone.

Team	No.	Driver name	Rounds
(France) ART Grand Prix	1	(France) Alexandre Prémat	All
(France) ART Grand Prix	2	(United Kingdom) Lewis Hamilton	All
(Netherlands) Arden International Ltd (Note: Arden International competed under a Dutch licence.)	3	(Germany) Michael Ammermüller	All
(Netherlands) Arden International Ltd	4	(France) Nicolas Lapierre	1–5, 8–11
(Netherlands) Arden International Ltd	4	(Switzerland) Neel Jani	6–7
(United Kingdom) Super Nova International	5	(Argentina) José María López	All
(United Kingdom) Super Nova International	6	(Malaysia) Fairuz Fauzy	All
(United Kingdom) iSport International	7	(Venezuela) Ernesto Viso	All
(United Kingdom) iSport International	8	(France) Tristan Gommendy	1–5
(United Kingdom) iSport International	8	(Germany) Timo Glock	6–11
(Spain) Racing Engineering	9	(United Kingdom) Adam Carroll	All
(Spain) Racing Engineering	10	(Spain) Javier Villa	All
(Brazil) Piquet Sports	11	(Brazil) Nelson Piquet Jr.	All
(Brazil) Piquet Sports	12	(Brazil) Alexandre Negrão	All
(France) DAMS	14	(Italy) Ferdinando Monfardini	All
(France) DAMS	15	(France) Franck Perera	All
(Italy) FMS International (1–2) (Italy) Petrol Ofisi FMS International (3–11)	16	(Italy) Luca Filippi	1–3
(Italy) FMS International (1–2) (Italy) Petrol Ofisi FMS International (3–11)	16	(Italy) Giorgio Pantano	4–11
(Italy) FMS International (1–2) (Italy) Petrol Ofisi FMS International (3–11)	17	(Turkey) Jason Tahinci	All
(Spain) BCN Competición	18	(Japan) Hiroki Yoshimoto	All
(Spain) BCN Competición	19	(Germany) Timo Glock	1–5
(Spain) BCN Competición	19	(Italy) Luca Filippi	6–11
(United Kingdom) DPR (1–2, 8–11) (United Kingdom) DPR Direxiv (3–7)	20	(France) Olivier Pla	1–5, 7
(United Kingdom) DPR (1–2, 8–11) (United Kingdom) DPR Direxiv (3–7)	20	(United Kingdom) Mike Conway	6
(United Kingdom) DPR (1–2, 8–11) (United Kingdom) DPR Direxiv (3–7)	20	(Russia) Vitaly Petrov	8–11
(United Kingdom) DPR (1–2, 8–11) (United Kingdom) DPR Direxiv (3–7)	21	(Monaco) Clivio Piccione	All
(Italy) Durango	22	(Brazil) Lucas di Grassi	All
(Italy) Durango	23	(Spain) Sergio Hernández	All
(Spain) Campos Racing	24	(Spain) Adrián Vallés	All
(Spain) Campos Racing	25	(Spain) Félix Porteiro	All
(Italy) Trident Racing	26	(Italy) Gianmaria Bruni	All
(Italy) Trident Racing	27	(United Arab Emirates) Andreas Zuber (Note: Zuber is an Austrian driver who competed under an Emirati racing licence.)	All

=== Driver changes ===
Changed Teams

- Gianmaria Bruni: Durango → Trident Racing
- Adam Carroll: Super Nova International → Racing Engineering
- Fairuz Fauzy: DAMS → Super Nova International
- Sergio Hernández: Campos Racing → Durango
- Neel Jani: Racing Engineering → Arden International Ltd
- José María López: DAMS → Super Nova International
- Ferdinando Monfardini: Coloni Motorsport → DAMS
- Giorgio Pantano: Super Nova International → Petrol Ofisi FMS International
- Clivio Piccione: Durango → DPR
- Ernesto Viso: BCN Competición → iSport International

Entering GP2

- Michael Ammermüller: Eurocup Formula Renault 2.0 & Italian Formula Renault Championship (Jenzer Motorsport) → Arden International Ltd
- Mike Conway: British Formula 3 Championship (Fortec Motorsport) → DPR Direxiv
- Lucas di Grassi: Formula Three Euroseries (Manor Motorsport) → Durango
- Luca Filippi: Italian Formula 3000 (Fisichella Motorsport) → FMS International
- Timo Glock: Champ Car World Series (Rocketsports Racing) → BCN Competición
- Tristan Gommendy: World Series by Renault (Witmeur KTR) → iSport International
- Lewis Hamilton: Formula Three Euroseries (ASM Formule 3) → ART Grand Prix
- Franck Perera: Formula Three Euroseries (Prema Powerteam) → DAMS
- Vitaly Petrov: Formula 1600 Russia (Art Line ProTeam) → DPR
- Félix Porteiro: World Series by Renault (Epsilon by Graff) → Campos Racing
- Jason Tahinci: British Formula Renault Championship (Team JLR) → FMS International
- Adrián Vallés: World Series by Renault (Pons Racing) → Campos Racing
- Javier Villa: Spanish Formula Three Championship (Racing Engineering) → Racing Engineering
- Andreas Zuber: World Series by Renault (Carlin Motorsport) → Trident Racing

Leaving GP2

- Juan Cruz Álvarez: Campos Racing → Top Race V6 Argentina (Catalan Magni Motorsports)
- Can Artam: iSport International → Retirement
- Borja García: Racing Engineering → World Series by Renault (RC Motorsport)
- Heikki Kovalainen: Arden International → Formula One (Mild Seven Renault F1 Team test driver)
- Mathias Lauda: Coloni Motorsport → Deutsche Tourenwagen Masters (Persson Motorsport)
- Giorgio Mondini: DPR → A1 Grand Prix (A1 Team Switzerland)
- Nico Rosberg: ART Grand Prix → Formula One (WilliamsF1 Team)
- Ryan Sharp: DPR → World Touring Car Championship (JAS Motorsport)
- Scott Speed: iSport International → Formula One (Scuderia Toro Rosso)
- Toni Vilander: Coloni Motorsport → Italian GT Championship (Playteam Sara Free)

==== Midseason changes ====
- Giorgio Pantano replaced Luca Filippi after Nürburg races.
- Timo Glock replaced Tristan Gommendy after Monaco race.
- Luca Filippi replaced Timo Glock after Monaco race.
- Neel Jani replaced Nicolas Lapierre for Silverstone and Magny-Cours races.
- Mike Conway replaced Olivier Pla for Silverstone races.
- Vitaly Petrov replaced Olivier Pla after Magny-Cours races.

== Calendar ==
Round		Location	Circuit	Date	Supporting
1	F	Cheste, Spain	Circuit de Valencia	8 April	Spanish F3 Championship
1	S	Cheste, Spain	Circuit de Valencia	9 April	Spanish F3 Championship
2	F	Imola, Italy	Autodromo Enzo e Dino Ferrari	22 April	San Marino Grand Prix
2	S	Imola, Italy	Autodromo Enzo e Dino Ferrari	23 April	San Marino Grand Prix
3	F	Nürburg, Germany	Nürburgring	6 May	European Grand Prix
3	S	Nürburg, Germany	Nürburgring	7 May	European Grand Prix
4	F	Montmeló, Spain	Circuit de Catalunya	13 May	Spanish Grand Prix
4	S	Montmeló, Spain	Circuit de Catalunya	14 May	Spanish Grand Prix
5	F	Monaco	Circuit de Monaco	27 May	Monaco Grand Prix
6	F	(United Kingdom) Silverstone, Great Britain	Silverstone Circuit	10 June	British Grand Prix
6	S	(United Kingdom) Silverstone, Great Britain	Silverstone Circuit	11 June	British Grand Prix
7	F	Magny-Cours, France	Circuit de Nevers Magny-Cours	15 July	French Grand Prix
7	S	Magny-Cours, France	Circuit de Nevers Magny-Cours	16 July	French Grand Prix
8	F	Hockenheim, Germany	Hockenheimring	29 July	German Grand Prix
8	S	Hockenheim, Germany	Hockenheimring	30 July	German Grand Prix
9	F	Mogyoród, Hungary	Hungaroring	5 August	Hungarian Grand Prix
9	S	Mogyoród, Hungary	Hungaroring	6 August	Hungarian Grand Prix
10	F	Istanbul, Turkey	Istanbul Park	26 August	Turkish Grand Prix
10	S	Istanbul, Turkey	Istanbul Park	27 August	Turkish Grand Prix
11	F	Monza, Italy	Autodromo Nazionale Monza	9 September	Italian Grand Prix
11	S	Monza, Italy	Autodromo Nazionale Monza	10 September	Italian Grand Prix

The following rounds were included on the provisional calendars published by the FIA but were cancelled:

Round	Location	Circuit	Date	Supporting
F	Stavelot, Belgium	Circuit de Spa-Francorchamps	16 September	Belgian Grand Prix
S	Stavelot, Belgium	Circuit de Spa-Francorchamps	17 September	Belgian Grand Prix

February 2006, the FIA announced the GP2 Spa round would not be part of the 2006 GP2 Season, since the local authorities had started major repair work in Spa-Francorchamps.

== Results ==
Round		Circuit	Pole position	Fastest lap	Winning driver	Winning team	Report
1	F	(Spain) Circuit de Valencia	(Brazil) Nelson Piquet Jr.	(France) Nicolas Lapierre	(Brazil) Nelson Piquet Jr.	(Brazil) Piquet Sports	Report
1	S	(Spain) Circuit de Valencia		(United Arab Emirates) Andreas Zuber (Note: Andreas Zuber set the fastest lap, but he started from the pitlane, so the points were given to Nelson Piquet Jr.)	(Germany) Michael Ammermüller	(Netherlands) Arden International Ltd	Report
2	F	(Italy) Autodromo Enzo e Dino Ferrari	(Italy) Gianmaria Bruni	(Spain) Adrián Vallés (Note: Adrián Vallés set the fastest lap, but he started from the pitlane, so the points were given to Gianmaria Bruni.)	(Italy) Gianmaria Bruni	(Italy) Trident Racing	Report
2	S	(Italy) Autodromo Enzo e Dino Ferrari		(Venezuela) Ernesto Viso	(Venezuela) Ernesto Viso	(United Kingdom) iSport International	Report
3	F	(Germany) Nürburgring	(Brazil) Nelson Piquet Jr.	(United Kingdom) Lewis Hamilton	(United Kingdom) Lewis Hamilton	(France) ART Grand Prix	Report
3	S	(Germany) Nürburgring		(France) Alexandre Prémat (Note: Alexandre Prémat set the fastest lap, but he started from the pitlane, so the points were given to Gianmaria Bruni.)	(United Kingdom) Lewis Hamilton	(France) ART Grand Prix	Report
4	F	(Spain) Circuit de Catalunya	(Brazil) Nelson Piquet Jr. (Note: Lewis Hamilton recorded the fastest time in qualifying, but received a penalty for disregarding yellow flags. Nelson Piquet Jr. was recognised as the pole-sitter for the race.)	(Spain) Adrián Vallés	(France) Alexandre Prémat	(France) ART Grand Prix	Report
4	S	(Spain) Circuit de Catalunya		(Italy) Gianmaria Bruni	(Venezuela) Ernesto Viso	(United Kingdom) iSport International	Report
5	F	Circuit de Monaco	(United Kingdom) Lewis Hamilton	(Brazil) Lucas di Grassi	(United Kingdom) Lewis Hamilton	(France) ART Grand Prix	Report
6	F	(United Kingdom) Silverstone Circuit	(United Kingdom) Adam Carroll	(United Kingdom) Lewis Hamilton	(United Kingdom) Lewis Hamilton	(France) ART Grand Prix	Report
6	S	(United Kingdom) Silverstone Circuit		(United Kingdom) Lewis Hamilton	(United Kingdom) Lewis Hamilton	(France) ART Grand Prix	Report
7	F	(France) Circuit de Nevers Magny-Cours	(Argentina) José María López	(United Kingdom) Lewis Hamilton	(Germany) Timo Glock	(United Kingdom) iSport International	Report
7	S	(France) Circuit de Nevers Magny-Cours		(Argentina) José María López (Note: José María López did not finish the race so the points were given to Timo Glock.)	(Italy) Giorgio Pantano	(Italy) Petrol Ofisi FMS International	Report
8	F	(Germany) Hockenheimring	(Italy) Gianmaria Bruni	(France) Alexandre Prémat	(Italy) Gianmaria Bruni	(Italy) Trident Racing	Report
8	S	(Germany) Hockenheimring		(Brazil) Lucas di Grassi (Note: Lucas di Grassi did not finish the race so the points were given to José María López.)	(Germany) Timo Glock	(United Kingdom) iSport International	Report
9	F	(Hungary) Hungaroring	(Brazil) Nelson Piquet Jr.	(Brazil) Nelson Piquet Jr.	(Brazil) Nelson Piquet Jr.	(Brazil) Piquet Sports	Report
9	S	(Hungary) Hungaroring		(Brazil) Nelson Piquet Jr.	(Brazil) Nelson Piquet Jr.	(Brazil) Piquet Sports	Report
10	F	(Turkey) Istanbul Racing Circuit	(Brazil) Nelson Piquet Jr.	(Brazil) Nelson Piquet Jr.	(Brazil) Nelson Piquet Jr.	(Brazil) Piquet Sports	Report
10	S	(Turkey) Istanbul Racing Circuit		(United Kingdom) Lewis Hamilton	(United Arab Emirates) Andreas Zuber	(Italy) Trident Racing	Report
11	F	(Italy) Autodromo Nazionale Monza	(Brazil) Nelson Piquet Jr.	(United Kingdom) Lewis Hamilton	(Italy) Giorgio Pantano	(Italy) Petrol Ofisi FMS International	Report
11	S	(Italy) Autodromo Nazionale Monza		(United Kingdom) Lewis Hamilton	(Italy) Giorgio Pantano	(Italy) Petrol Ofisi FMS International	Report

== Championship standings ==
Scoring system

Points are awarded to the top 8 classified finishers in the Feature race, and to the top 6 classified finishers in the Sprint race. The pole-sitter in the feature race will also receive two points, and one point is given to the driver who set the fastest lap in the feature and sprint races. The driver also had to start the race from his allocated grid position to be eligible to claim the fastest lap and has to drive 90% of race laps. No extra points are awarded to the pole-sitter in the sprint race.

Feature race points

Position	**1st**	**2nd**	**3rd**	**4th**	**5th**	**6th**	**7th**	**8th**	**Pole**	**FL**
Points	10	8	6	5	4	3	2	1	2	1

Sprint race points

Points are awarded to the top 6 classified finishers.

Position	**1st**	**2nd**	**3rd**	**4th**	**5th**	**6th**	**FL**
Points	6	5	4	3	2	1	1

=== Drivers' Championship ===
Pos	Driver	VAL (Spain)		IMO (Italy)		NÜR (Germany)		CAT (Spain)		MON (Monaco)	SIL (United Kingdom)		MAG (France)		HOC (Germany)		HUN (Hungary)		IST (Turkey)		MNZ (Italy)		Points
1	(United Kingdom) Lewis Hamilton	2	6	DSQ	10	1	1	2	4	**1**	1	1	19	5	2	3	10	2	2	2	3	2	114
2	(Brazil) Nelson Piquet Jr.	**1**	4	5	2	**Ret**	19†	**4**	2	12†	4	5	4	2	13†	DNS	**1**	1	**1**	5	**2**	6	102
3	(France) Alexandre Prémat	9	Ret	4	Ret	2	17	1	3	3	6	Ret	2	3	19	Ret	6	3	3	7	5	Ret	66
4	(Germany) Timo Glock	16	8	7	4	17	Ret	11	10	Ret	2	6	1	4	3	1	2	5	4	4	Ret	DNS	58
5	(Italy) Giorgio Pantano							9	7	Ret	5	4	6	1	5	5	3	13	Ret	Ret	1	1	44
6	(Venezuela) Ernesto Viso	8	2	6	1	6	11	8	1	Ret	Ret	8	10	Ret	4	4	4	4	Ret	13	Ret	8	42
7	(Italy) Gianmaria Bruni	6	5	**1**	Ret	Ret	16	Ret	17	Ret	Ret	15	Ret	Ret	**1**	6	Ret	8	Ret	15	Ret	9	33
8	(United Kingdom) Adam Carroll	14	Ret	Ret	12	3	5	10	12	Ret	**3**	2	20	14	6	8	7	Ret	6	3	Ret	Ret	33
9	(France) Nicolas Lapierre	4	3	3	7	5	2	Ret	Ret	Ret					20	7	Ret	Ret	14	6	6	4	32
10	(Argentina) José María López	5	Ret	Ret	19†	4	3	Ret	Ret	NC	Ret	14	**3**	Ret	7	2	8	Ret	9	11	Ret	Ret	30
11	(Germany) Michael Ammermüller	7	1	2	Ret	10	6	3	8	7	Ret	Ret	12	8	9	Ret	Ret	11	13	Ret	12	Ret	25
12	(Monaco) Clivio Piccione	Ret	Ret	Ret	16	11	8	16†	Ret	4	7	3	13	Ret	8	Ret	Ret	Ret	Ret	Ret	7	3	18
13	(Brazil) Alexandre Negrão	13	7	Ret	11	7	7	7	18	Ret	Ret	12	5	Ret	16	9	5	Ret	8	Ret	Ret	Ret	13
14	(United Arab Emirates) Andreas Zuber	Ret	13	Ret	8	14	Ret	Ret	11	5	Ret	Ret	Ret	18	Ret	14	14	9	7	1	Ret	NC	12
15	(Japan) Hiroki Yoshimoto	Ret	12	8	3	8	4	Ret	Ret	Ret	Ret	17†	9	Ret	23†	Ret	Ret	Ret	Ret	19	8	5	12
16	(France) Franck Perera	11	14	Ret	14	Ret	15	13	Ret	2	Ret	10	Ret	12	14	11	9	Ret	12	8	15†	15†	8
17	(Brazil) Lucas di Grassi	17	16†	Ret	Ret	18	13	12	9	11	Ret	EX	7	6	DNS	Ret	13	Ret	5	9	10	14	8
18	(Spain) Adrián Vallés	3	Ret	9	Ret	Ret	14	18	16	Ret	9	Ret	15	13	18	Ret	Ret	7	Ret	14	Ret	11	7
19	(Italy) Luca Filippi	Ret	Ret	11	5	Ret	Ret				Ret	9	Ret	Ret	21	16	12	Ret	10	Ret	4	7	7
20	(France) Tristan Gommendy	Ret	11	Ret	17	13	12	5	5	Ret													6
21	(Italy) Ferdinando Monfardini	12	Ret	12	9	Ret	10	6	6	9	Ret	DNS	8	Ret	Ret	12	11	6	18†	12	Ret	Ret	6
22	(Spain) Félix Porteiro	Ret	Ret	10	6	16	Ret	17	Ret	6	8	DSQ	18	10	12	18	Ret	12	19†	Ret	Ret	NC	5
23	(Spain) Sergio Hernández	Ret	DNS	Ret	13	12	Ret	Ret	13	8	DSQ	EX	14	11	10	NC	Ret	Ret	11	10	13	Ret	1
24	(Malaysia) Fairuz Fauzy	15	10	Ret	15	19	9	Ret	14	10	11	7	Ret	15	22	10	16	Ret	Ret	Ret	14	10	0
25	(Switzerland) Neel Jani										NC	Ret	11	7									0
26	(Spain) Javier Villa	18	9	13	18	9	20	14	15	Ret	13	13	17	16	11	13	Ret	15†	15	16	9	Ret	0
27	(France) Olivier Pla	10	15	Ret	20†	15	Ret	DSQ	20	Ret			16	9									0
28	(Russia) Vitaly Petrov														15	15	15	10	16	18	Ret	12	0
29	(United Kingdom) Mike Conway										10	11											0
30	(Turkey) Jason Tahinci	DNS	Ret	Ret	Ret	DSQ	18	15	19	Ret	12	16	Ret	17	17	17	Ret	14	17	17	11	13	0
Pos	Driver	VAL (Spain)		IMO (Italy)		NÜR (Germany)		CAT (Spain)		MON (Monaco)	SIL (United Kingdom)		MAG (France)		HOC (Germany)		HUN (Hungary)		IST (Turkey)		MNZ (Italy)		Points

Key
Colour	Result
Gold	Winner
Silver	2nd place
Bronze	3rd place
Green	Other points position
Blue	Other classified position
Blue	Not classified, finished (NC)
Purple	Not classified, retired (Ret)
Red	Did not qualify (DNQ)
Red	Did not pre-qualify (DNPQ)
Black	Disqualified (DSQ)
White	Did not start (DNS)
White	Race cancelled (C)
Blank	Did not practice (DNP)
Blank	Excluded (EX)
Blank	Did not arrive (DNA)
Blank	Withdrawn (WD)
Text formatting	Meaning
**Bold**	Pole position point(s)
Italics	Fastest lap point(s)

Notes:

- Drivers did not finish the race, but were classified as they completed more than 90% of the race distance.
- Lewis Hamilton was disqualified during the first race at Imola for passing the safety car. Team ART Grand Prix's statement on this is that he was following the Campos Racing cars which led him past the car.
- Olivier Pla was disqualified in Montmeló from 8th place for car being under the weight limit.
- Durango cars were excluded from second Silverstone race for illegal rear wing which caused di Grassi's accident in first race.
- Felix Porteiro was disqualified from 2nd place in Silverstone sprint race for illegal position of steering rack.

=== Teams' Championship ===
Pos	Team	Car No.	VAL (Spain)		IMO (Italy)		NÜR (Germany)		CAT (Spain)		MON (Monaco)	SIL (United Kingdom)		MAG (France)		HOC (Germany)		HUN (Hungary)		IST (Turkey)		MNZ (Italy)		Points
1	(France) ART Grand Prix	1	9	Ret	4	Ret	2	17	1	3	3	6	Ret	2	3	19	Ret	6	3	3	7	5	Ret	180
1	(France) ART Grand Prix	2	2	6	DSQ	10	1	1	2	4	**1**	1	1	19	5	2	3	10	2	2	2	3	2	180
2	(Brazil) Piquet Sports	11	**1**	4	5	2	**Ret**	19†	**4**	2	12†	4	5	4	2	13†	DNS	**1**	1	**1**	5	**2**	6	115
2	(Brazil) Piquet Sports	12	13	7	Ret	11	7	7	7	18	Ret	Ret	12	5	Ret	16	9	5	Ret	8	Ret	Ret	Ret	115
3	(United Kingdom) iSport International	7	8	2	6	1	6	11	8	1	Ret	Ret	8	10	Ret	4	4	4	4	Ret	13	Ret	10	101
3	(United Kingdom) iSport International	8	Ret	11	Ret	17	13	12	5	5	Ret	2	6	1	4	3	1	2	5	4	4	Ret	DNS	101
4	(Netherlands) Arden International Ltd	3	7	1	2	Ret	10	6	3	8	7	Ret	Ret	12	8	9	Ret	Ret	11	13	Ret	12	Ret	57
4	(Netherlands) Arden International Ltd	4	4	3	3	7	5	2	Ret	Ret	Ret	NC	Ret	11	7	20	7	Ret	Ret	14	6	6	4	57
5	(Italy) FMS International (1–2) (Italy) Petrol Ofisi FMS International (3–11)	16	Ret	Ret	11	5	Ret	Ret	9	7	Ret	5	4	6	1	5	5	3	13	Ret	Ret	1	1	46
5	(Italy) FMS International (1–2) (Italy) Petrol Ofisi FMS International (3–11)	17	DNS	Ret	Ret	Ret	DSQ	18	15	19	Ret	12	16	Ret	17	17	17	Ret	14	17	17	11	13	46
6	(Italy) Trident Racing	26	6	5	**1**	Ret	Ret	16	Ret	17	Ret	Ret	15	Ret	Ret	**1**	6	Ret	8	Ret	15	Ret	9	45
6	(Italy) Trident Racing	27	Ret	13	Ret	8	14	Ret	Ret	11	5	Ret	Ret	Ret	18	Ret	14	14	9	7	1	Ret	NC	45
7	(Spain) Racing Engineering	9	14	Ret	Ret	12	3	5	10	12	Ret	**3**	2	20	14	6	8	7	Ret	6	3	Ret	Ret	33
7	(Spain) Racing Engineering	10	18	9	13	18	9	20	14	15	Ret	13	13	17	16	11	13	Ret	15†	15	16	9	Ret	33
8	(United Kingdom) Super Nova International	5	5	Ret	Ret	19†	4	3	Ret	Ret	NC	Ret	14	**3**	Ret	7	2	8	Ret	9	11	Ret	Ret	30
8	(United Kingdom) Super Nova International	6	15	10	Ret	15	19	9	Ret	14	10	11	7	Ret	15	22	10	16	Ret	Ret	Ret	14	10	30
9	(Spain) BCN Competición	18	Ret	12	8	3	8	4	Ret	Ret	Ret	Ret	17†	9	Ret	23†	Ret	Ret	Ret	Ret	19	8	5	22
9	(Spain) BCN Competición	19	16	8	7	4	17	Ret	11	10	Ret	Ret	9	Ret	Ret	21	16	12	Ret	10	Ret	4	7	22
10	(United Kingdom) DPR (1–2, 8–11) (United Kingdom) DPR Direxiv (3–7)	20	10	15	Ret	20†	15	Ret	DSQ	20	Ret	10	11	16	9	15	15	15	10	16	18	Ret	12	18
10	(United Kingdom) DPR (1–2, 8–11) (United Kingdom) DPR Direxiv (3–7)	21	Ret	Ret	Ret	16	11	8	16†	Ret	4	7	3	13	Ret	8	Ret	Ret	Ret	Ret	Ret	7	3	18
11	(France) DAMS	14	12	Ret	12	9	Ret	10	6	6	9	Ret	DNS	8	Ret	Ret	12	11	6	18†	12	Ret	Ret	14
11	(France) DAMS	15	11	14	Ret	14	Ret	15	13	Ret	2	Ret	10	Ret	12	14	11	9	Ret	12	8	15†	15†	14
12	(Spain) Campos Racing	24	3	Ret	9	Ret	Ret	14	18	16	Ret	9	Ret	15	13	18	Ret	Ret	7	Ret	14	Ret	11	12
12	(Spain) Campos Racing	25	Ret	Ret	10	6	16	Ret	17	Ret	6	8	DSQ	18	10	12	18	Ret	12	19†	Ret	Ret	NC	12
13	(Italy) Durango	22	17	16†	Ret	Ret	18	13	12	9	11	Ret	EX	7	6	DNS	Ret	13	Ret	5	9	10	14	9
13	(Italy) Durango	23	Ret	DNS	Ret	13	12	Ret	Ret	13	8	DSQ	EX	14	11	10	NC	Ret	Ret	11	10	13	Ret	9
Pos	Team	Car No.	VAL (Spain)		IMO (Italy)		NÜR (Germany)		CAT (Spain)		MON (Monaco)	SIL (United Kingdom)		MAG (France)		HOC (Germany)		HUN (Hungary)		IST (Turkey)		MNZ (Italy)		Points
