= Ferdinando Monfardini =

Italian race car driver (born 1984)

- Nationality: (Italy) Italian
- Born: 20 November 1984 (age 41) Isola della Scala

International GT Open GTA career
- Debut season: 2008
- Current team: Racing Team EdilCris
- Starts: 6
- Wins: 0
- Poles: 0
- Fastest laps: 0

Previous series
- 2007 2005-2006 2005 2003-2004 2002-2003 2001-2003: FIA GT Championship (GT1); GP2 Series; Formula Renault 3.5 Series; International Formula 3000; Eurocup Formula Renault 2.0; Formula Renault 2.0 Italia

Ferdinando Monfardini (born 20 November 1984 in Isola della Scala) is an Italian former race car driver. He raced in the 2005 and 2006 GP2 Series seasons, having previously raced in the Formula 3000 series which it replaced.

== Career ==
Monfardini started out in 1994, competing in karting like many of his GP2 rivals. He stayed there until 2000, debuting in Italian Formula Renault in 2001. He would stay there in 2002, also driving in Formula Renault 2000 Eurocup. He again raced in Italian Formula Renault in 2003, driving two races in both 2000 Eurocup and Formula 3000, the latter being with the BCN team.

In 2004, Monfardini drove the full F3000 season for the AEZ team, and in 2005 was one of a select few GP2 Series drivers with a full season of F3000 experience behind them. He drove for the Durango team as the number two to Clivio Piccione, moving to the Coloni team at the end of the season, essentially switching places with compatriot Gianmaria Bruni. For 2006 he moved to the DAMS team, but only scored one more point than in the previous season and was not retained beyond the end of the year.

For 2007, Monfardini raced in the GT1 class of the FIA GT Championship, driving an Aston Martin DBR9. For 2008, he drove a Ferrari 430 in the GTA class of the International GT Open.

== Racing record ==
=== Complete Formula Renault 2.0 Italia results ===
(key) (Races in bold indicate pole position; races in italics indicate fastest lap.)

Year	Entrant	1	2	3	4	5	6	7	8	9	10	11	12	DC	Points
2001	Durango Benetton Junior	VLL; 25	PER; 17	MGI; DNS	MNZ; 9	MIS; 10	VAR; DNS	IMO; Ret	MUG; 13	BIN; 15	EST; 18			26th	6
2002	Durango	VLL; 27	PER	PER	SPA; 10	MGI	MNZ; Ret	VAR	IMO	MIS	MUG			28th	2
2003	Durango	VLL; 11	VLL; Ret	MGI; Ret	SPA; 7	SPA; 5	A1R; 11	A1R; 6	MIS; 7	MIS; 11	VAR	ADR	MNZ	10th	38

=== Complete Formula Renault 2.0 Eurocup results ===
(key) (Races in bold indicate pole position) (Races in italics indicate fastest lap)

Year	Entrant	1	2	3	4	5	6	7	8	9	DC	Points
2002	Durango	MAG; 14	SIL; 12	JAR; 26	AND; 13	OSC; 25	SPA; 12	IMO; 20	DON; 17	EST; 16	33rd	0
2003	Durango	BRN; 1; 18	BRN; 2; 12	ASS; 1	ASS; 2	OSC; 1	OSC; 2	DON; 1	DON; 2		31st	0

=== Complete International Formula 3000 results ===
(key) (Races in bold indicate pole position; races in italics indicate fastest lap.)

Year	Entrant	1	2	3	4	5	6	7	8	9	10	DC	Points
2003	BCN F3000	IMO	CAT	A1R	MON	NUR	MAG	SIL	HOC	HUN; Ret	MNZ; 10	NC	0
2004	AEZ Racing	IMO; 14	CAT; 13	MON; 13	NUR; 15	MAG; 10	SIL; 9	HOC; Ret	HUN; 13	SPA; 16	MNZ; 14	NC	0

=== Complete GP2 Series results ===
(key) (Races in bold indicate pole position) (Races in italics indicate fastest lap)

Year	Entrant	1	2	3	4	5	6	7	8	9	10	11	12	13	14	15	16	17	18	19	20	21	22	23	DC	Points
2005	Durango	IMO; FEA; Ret	IMO; SPR; DNS	CAT; FEA; Ret	CAT; SPR; 11	MON; FEA; DNS	NÜR; FEA; Ret	NÜR; SPR; 6	MAG; FEA; 12	MAG; SPR; 17^{†}	SIL; FEA; 14	SIL; SPR; 10	HOC; FEA; Ret	HOC; SPR; 15	HUN; FEA; Ret	HUN; SPR; 11	IST; FEA; Ret	IST; SPR; Ret	MNZ; FEA; 8	MNZ; SPR; 4	SPA; FEA	SPA; SPR			17th	5
2005	Coloni Motorsport																						BHR; FEA; Ret	BHR; SPR; 11	17th	5
2006	DAMS	VAL; FEA; 12	VAL; SPR; Ret	IMO; FEA; 12	IMO; SPR; 9	NÜR; FEA; Ret	NÜR; SPR; 10	CAT; FEA; 6	CAT; SPR; 6	MON; FEA; 9	SIL; FEA; Ret	SIL; SPR; DNS	MAG; FEA; 8	MAG; SPR; Ret	HOC; FEA; Ret	HOC; SPR; 12	HUN; FEA; 11	HUN; SPR; 6	IST; FEA; 18^{†}	IST; SPR; 12	MNZ; FEA; Ret	MNZ; SPR; Ret			21st	6

=== Complete Formula Renault 3.5 Series results ===
(key) (Races in bold indicate pole position) (Races in italics indicate fastest lap)

Year	Entrant	1	2	3	4	5	6	7	8	9	10	11	12	13	14	15	16	17	DC	Points
2005	DAMS	ZOL; 1	ZOL; 2	MON; 1	VAL; 1	VAL; 2	LMS; 1	LMS; 2	BIL; 1	BIL; 2	OSC; 1	OSC; 2	DON; 1	DON; 2	EST; 1	EST; 2	MNZ; 1; 10	MNZ; 2; 13	28th	1
