= 2005 Monza GP2 Series round =

Grand Prix

(Italy) 2005 Monza GP2 round
Round details
- Round 10 of 12 rounds in the 2005 GP2 Series
- Monza
- Location: Autodromo Nazionale Monza, Monza, Italy
- Course: Permanent racing facility 5.793 km (3.600 mi)

GP2 Series

Feature race
- Date: 3 September 2005
- Laps: 32

Pole position
Driver	(Finland) Heikki Kovalainen	Arden International
- Time: 1:33.739

Podium
First	(Finland) Heikki Kovalainen	Arden International
Second	(Germany) Nico Rosberg	ART Grand Prix
Third	(Brazil) Nelson Piquet Jr.	Hitech Piquet Sports

Fastest lap
Driver	(Germany) Nico Rosberg (Note: Giorgio Pantano set the fastest lap, but her performance was revoked by a decision of the jury, so the points were given to Nico Rosberg.)	ART Grand Prix
- Time: 1:36.315 (on lap 10)

Sprint race
- Date: 4 September 2005
- Laps: 20

Podium
First	(Switzerland) Neel Jani	Racing Engineering
Second	(Germany) Nico Rosberg	ART Grand Prix
Third	(Italy) Giorgio Pantano	Super Nova International

Fastest lap
Driver	(Germany) Nico Rosberg (Note: Scott Speed set the fastest lap, but judges penalised him for changing his tires during race, so the points were given to Nico Rosberg.)	ART Grand Prix
- Time: 1:35.881 (on lap 19)

The 2005 Monza GP2 Series round was a GP2 Series motor race held on 3 and 4 September 2005 at the Autodromo Nazionale Monza in Monza, Italy. It was the tenth round of the 2005 GP2 Series season. The race weekend supported the 2005 Italian Grand Prix.

== Classification ==
=== Qualifying ===
Pos.	No.	Driver	Team	Time	Gap	Grid
1	22	(Finland) Heikki Kovalainen	Arden International	1:33.739		1
2	9	(Germany) Nico Rosberg	ART Grand Prix	1:33.930	+0.205	2
3	1	(United States) Scott Speed	iSport International	1:34.851	+1.126	3
4	10	(France) Alexandre Prémat	ART Grand Prix	1:35.137	+1.412	4
5	14	(France) José María López	DAMS	1:35.160	+1.435	5
6	3	(Brazil) Nelson Piquet Jr.	Hitech Piquet Sports	1:35.224	+1.499	6
7	23	(France) Nicolas Lapierre	Arden International	1:35.232	+1.507	7
8	25	(Italy) Ferdinando Monfardini	Durango	1:35.258	+1.533	8
9	18	(Switzerland) Neel Jani	Racing Engineering	1:35.410	+1.685	9
10	7	(Italy) Giorgio Pantano	Super Nova International	1:35.463	+1.738	10
11	19	(Spain) Borja García	Racing Engineering	1:35.593	+1.868	11
12	5	(Venezuela) Ernesto Viso	BCN Competición	1:35.721	+1.996	12
13	21	(Spain) Sergio Hernández	Campos Racing	1:35.744	+2.019	13
14	6	(Japan) Hiroki Yoshimoto	BCN Competición	1:35.821	+2.096	14
15	12	(Italy) Giorgio Mondini	DPR	1:35.857	+2.132	15
16	17	(Finland) Toni Vilander	Coloni Motorsport	1:35.944	+2.219	16
17	11	(France) Olivier Pla	DPR	1:36.044	+2.319	17
18	20	(Spain) Juan Cruz Álvarez	Campos Racing	1:36.119	+2.394	18
19	24	(Monaco) Clivio Piccione	Durango	1:36.365	+2.640	19
20	2	(Turkey) Can Artam	iSport International	1:36.427	+2.702	20
21	4	(Brazil) Alexandre Negrão	Hitech Piquet Sports	1:36.551	+2.826	21
22	16	(Austria) Mathias Lauda	Coloni Motorsport	1:36.897	+3.172	22
23	15	(United Kingdom) Fairuz Fauzy	DAMS	1:36.933	+3.208	23
24	8	(United Kingdom) Adam Carroll	Super Nova International	1:37.396	+3.671	24
107% time: 1:40.285

=== Feature race ===
Pos.	No.	Driver	Team	Laps	Time/Retired	Grid	Points
1	22	(Finland) Heikki Kovalainen	Arden International	32	53:55.234	1	10+2
2	9	(Germany) Nico Rosberg	ART Grand Prix	32	+1.163	2	8+2
3	3	(Brazil) Nelson Piquet Jr.	Hitech Piquet Sports	32	+12.304	6	6
4	23	(France) Nicolas Lapierre	Arden International	32	+29.980	7	5
5	8	(United Kingdom) Adam Carroll	Super Nova International	32	+35.951	24	4
6	7	(Italy) Giorgio Pantano	Super Nova International	32	+37.920	10	3
7	18	(Switzerland) Neel Jani	Racing Engineering	32	+45.949	9	2
8	25	(Italy) Ferdinando Monfardini	Durango	32	+53.315	8	1
9	2	(Turkey) Can Artam	iSport International	32	+1:09.035	20	
10	6	(Japan) Hiroki Yoshimoto	BCN Competición	32	+1:09.816	14	
11	24	(Monaco) Clivio Piccione	Durango	32	+1:11.614	19	
12	20	(Spain) Juan Cruz Álvarez	Campos Racing	32	+1:20.367	18	
13	16	(Austria) Mathias Lauda	Coloni Motorsport	32	+1:31.089	22	
14	15	(United Kingdom) Fairuz Fauzy	DAMS	32	+1:31.778	23	
15	17	(Finland) Toni Vilander	Coloni Motorsport	30	+2 laps	16	
Ret	5	(Venezuela) Ernesto Viso	BCN Competición	5	Collision	12	
Ret	21	(Spain) Sergio Hernández	Campos Racing	5	Collision	13	
Ret	4	(Brazil) Alexandre Negrão	Hitech Piquet Sports	4	Did not finish	21	
Ret	19	(Spain) Borja García	Racing Engineering	4	Did not finish	11	
Ret	10	(France) Alexandre Prémat	ART Grand Prix	2	Did not finish	4	
Ret	1	(United States) Scott Speed	iSport International	2	Did not finish	3	
Ret	14	(France) José María López	DAMS	2	Did not finish	5	
Ret	11	(France) Olivier Pla	DPR	0	Did not finish	17	
Ret	12	(Italy) Giorgio Mondini	DPR	0	Did not finish	15	
Fastest lap: Nico Rosberg (ART Grand Prix) — 1:36.315 (on lap 10)

=== Sprint race ===
Pos.	No.	Driver	Team	Laps	Time/Retired	Grid	Points
1	18	(Switzerland) Neel Jani	Racing Engineering	20	35:54.148	2	6
2	9	(Germany) Nico Rosberg	ART Grand Prix	20	+0.480	7	5+2
3	7	(Italy) Giorgio Pantano	Super Nova International	20	+2.416	3	4
4	25	(Italy) Ferdinando Monfardini	Durango	20	+6.162	1	3
5	22	(Finland) Heikki Kovalainen	Arden International	20	+6.207	8	2
6	8	(United Kingdom) Adam Carroll	Super Nova International	20	+11.210	4	1
7	21	(Spain) Sergio Hernández	Campos Racing	20	+15.062	16	
8	17	(Finland) Toni Vilander	Coloni Motorsport	20	+27.050	15	
9	2	(Turkey) Can Artam	iSport International	20	+30.031	9	
10	19	(Spain) Borja García	Racing Engineering	20	+34.518	18	
11	15	(United Kingdom) Fairuz Fauzy	DAMS	20	+38.846	14	
12	16	(Austria) Mathias Lauda	Coloni Motorsport	20	+40.056	13	
13	4	(Brazil) Alexandre Negrão	Hitech Piquet Sports	20	+40.657	17	
14	24	(Monaco) Clivio Piccione	Durango	20	+40.902	11	
15	1	(United States) Scott Speed	iSport International	20	+1:21.370	20	
16	6	(Japan) Hiroki Yoshimoto	BCN Competición	20	+1:30.273	10	
17	20	(Spain) Juan Cruz Álvarez	Campos Racing	19	+1 lap/DNF	12	
18	10	(France) Alexandre Prémat	ART Grand Prix	19	+1 lap	19	
Ret	12	(Italy) Giorgio Mondini	DPR	14	Did not finish	22	
Ret	14	(France) José María López	DAMS	8	Did not finish	21	
Ret	23	(France) Nicolas Lapierre	Arden International	8	Did not finish	5	
Ret	3	(Brazil) Nelson Piquet Jr.	Hitech Piquet Sports	6	Did not finish	6	
Ret	5	(Venezuela) Ernesto Viso	BCN Competición	6	Did not finish	24^{1}	
Ret	11	(France) Olivier Pla	DPR	5	Did not finish	23	
Fastest lap: Nico Rosberg (ART Grand Prix) — 1:35.881 (on lap 19)

Notes

- ^1 – Ernesto Viso was given a ten place grid penalty for colliding with Sergio Hernández in the feature race.

== Standings after the round ==
Drivers' Championship standings

	Pos.	Driver	Points
	1	(Finland) Heikki Kovalainen	99
	2	(Germany) Nico Rosberg	95
	3	(United States) Scott Speed	59
	4	(France) Alexandre Prémat	53
1	5	(Switzerland) Neel Jani	48

Teams' Championship standings

Pos.	Team	Points
1	(France) ART Grand Prix	148
2	(United Kingdom) Arden International	117
3	(United Kingdom) Super Nova International	89
4	(United Kingdom) iSport International	61
5	(Spain) Racing Engineering	60

- Note: Only the top five positions are included for both sets of standings.

== Notes ==
Previous round: 2005 Istanbul Park GP2 Series round	GP2 Series; 2005 season	Next round: 2005 Spa-Francorchamps GP2 Series round
Previous round: 2004 Monza F3000 round	Monza GP2 round	Next round: 2006 Monza GP2 Series round
