= 2005 Hungaroring GP2 Series round =

(Hungary) 2005 Hungaroring GP2 round
Round details
- Round 8 of 12 rounds in the 2005 GP2 Series
- Hungaroring
- Location: Hungaroring, Mogyoród, Pest, Hungary
- Course: Permanent racing facility 4.381 km (2.722 mi)

GP2 Series

Feature race
- Date: 30 July 2005
- Laps: 42

Pole position
Driver	(Switzerland) Neel Jani	Racing Engineering
- Time: 1:32.457

Podium
First	(Switzerland) Neel Jani	Racing Engineering
Second	(Finland) Heikki Kovalainen	Arden International
Third	(Italy) Giorgio Pantano	Super Nova International

Fastest lap
Driver	(Japan) Hiroki Yoshimoto	BCN Competición
- Time: 1:34.170 (on lap 39)

Sprint race
- Date: 31 July 2005
- Laps: 25

Podium
First	(France) Alexandre Prémat	ART Grand Prix
Second	(Germany) Nico Rosberg	ART Grand Prix
Third	(Italy) Giorgio Pantano	Super Nova International

Fastest lap
Driver	(Monaco) Clivio Piccione	Durango
- Time: 1:34.336 (on lap 25)

The 2005 Hungaroring GP2 Series round was a GP2 Series motor race held on 30 and 31 July 2005 at the Hungaroring in Mogyoród, Pest, Hungary. It was the eighth round of the 2005 GP2 Series season. The race weekend supported the 2005 Hungarian Grand Prix.

== Classification ==
=== Qualifying ===
Pos.	No.	Driver	Team	Time	Gap	Grid
1	9	(Germany) Nico Rosberg	ART Grand Prix	1:31.459		23^{1}
2	18	(Switzerland) Neel Jani	Racing Engineering	1:32.457	+0.998	1
3	22	(Finland) Heikki Kovalainen	Arden International	1:32.652	+1.193	2
4	7	(Italy) Giorgio Pantano	Super Nova International	1:32.666	+1.207	3
5	1	(United States) Scott Speed	iSport International	1:32.707	+1.248	4
6	10	(France) Alexandre Prémat	ART Grand Prix	1:32.908	+1.449	24^{1}
7	6	(Japan) Hiroki Yoshimoto	BCN Competición	1:33.005	+1.546	5
8	5	(Venezuela) Ernesto Viso	BCN Competición	1:33.102	+1.643	6
9	17	(Italy) Gianmaria Bruni	Coloni Motorsport	1:33.119	+1.660	7
10	11	(France) Olivier Pla	DPR	1:33.172	+1.713	8
11	23	(France) Nicolas Lapierre	Arden International	1:33.359	+1.900	9
12	19	(Spain) Borja García	Racing Engineering	1:33.602	+2.143	10
13	20	(Spain) Juan Cruz Álvarez	Campos Racing	1:33.632	+2.173	11
14	24	(Monaco) Clivio Piccione	Durango	1:33.634	+2.175	12
15	25	(Italy) Ferdinando Monfardini	Durango	1:33.828	+2.369	13
16	21	(Spain) Sergio Hernández	Campos Racing	1:34.131	+2.672	14
17	14	(France) José María López	DAMS	1:34.192	+2.733	15
18	3	(Brazil) Nelson Piquet Jr.	Hitech Piquet Sports	1:34.256	+2.797	16
19	15	(United Kingdom) Fairuz Fauzy	DAMS	1:34.608	+3.149	17
20	4	(Brazil) Alexandre Negrão	Hitech Piquet Sports	1:34.685	+3.226	18
21	8	(United Kingdom) Adam Carroll	Super Nova International	1:35.029	+3.570	19
22	2	(Turkey) Can Artam	iSport International	1:35.123	+3.664	20
23	16	(Austria) Mathias Lauda	Coloni Motorsport	1:35.186	+3.727	21
24	12	(Italy) Giorgio Mondini	DPR	1:35.916	+4.457	22
107% time: 1:38.929

Notes

- ^1 – ART Grand Prix cars were demoted to the back of the grid after post-qualifying inspection discovered suspension irregularities in both of their cars.

=== Feature race ===
Pos.	No.	Driver	Team	Laps	Time/Retired	Grid	Points
1	18	(Switzerland) Neel Jani	Racing Engineering	42	1:11:11.253	1	12
2	22	(Finland) Heikki Kovalainen	Arden International	42	+0.400	2	8
3	7	(Italy) Giorgio Pantano	Super Nova International	42	+1.700	3	6
4	10	(France) Alexandre Prémat	ART Grand Prix	42	+7.300	24	5
5	9	(Germany) Nico Rosberg	ART Grand Prix	42	+10.400	23	4
6	5	(Venezuela) Ernesto Viso	BCN Competición	42	+10.500	6	3
7	11	(France) Olivier Pla	DPR	42	+11.200	8	2
8	4	(Brazil) Alexandre Negrão	Hitech Piquet Sports	42	+21.100	18	1
9	8	(United Kingdom) Adam Carroll	Super Nova International	42	+23.000	19	
10	17	(Italy) Gianmaria Bruni	Coloni Motorsport	42	+33.200	7	
11	19	(Spain) Borja García	Racing Engineering	42	+39.400	10	
12	23	(France) Nicolas Lapierre	Arden International	41	+1 lap	9	
13	6	(Japan) Hiroki Yoshimoto	BCN Competición	41	+1 lap	5	2
14	2	(Turkey) Can Artam	iSport International	40	+2 laps	20	
15	3	(Brazil) Nelson Piquet Jr.	Hitech Piquet Sports	37	+5 laps/DNF	16	
Ret	14	(France) José María López	DAMS	29	Did not finish	15	
Ret	20	(Spain) Juan Cruz Álvarez	Campos Racing	25	Did not finish	11	
Ret	21	(Spain) Sergio Hernández	Campos Racing	24	Did not finish	14	
Ret	25	(Italy) Ferdinando Monfardini	Durango	21	Did not finish	13	
Ret	1	(United States) Scott Speed	iSport International	18	Did not finish	4	
Ret	16	(Austria) Mathias Lauda	Coloni Motorsport	18	Did not finish	21	
Ret	15	(United Kingdom) Fairuz Fauzy	DAMS	16	Did not finish	17	
Ret	12	(Italy) Giorgio Mondini	DPR	11	Did not finish	22	
Ret	24	(Monaco) Clivio Piccione	Durango	8	Did not finish	12	
Fastest lap: Hiroki Yoshimoto (BCN Competición) — 1:34.170 (on lap 39)

=== Sprint race ===
Pos.	No.	Driver	Team	Laps	Time/Retired	Grid	Points
1	10	(France) Alexandre Prémat	ART Grand Prix	25	45:05.029	5	6
2	9	(Germany) Nico Rosberg	ART Grand Prix	25	+0.400	4	5
3	7	(Italy) Giorgio Pantano	Super Nova International	25	+1.900	6	4
4	18	(Switzerland) Neel Jani	Racing Engineering	25	+3.600	8	3
5	22	(Finland) Heikki Kovalainen	Arden International	25	+4.500	7	2
6	23	(France) Nicolas Lapierre	Arden International	25	+5.300	12	1
7	20	(Spain) Juan Cruz Álvarez	Campos Racing	25	+5.900	17	
8	17	(Italy) Gianmaria Bruni	Coloni Motorsport	25	+6.400	10	
9	8	(United Kingdom) Adam Carroll	Super Nova International	25	+7.100	9	
10	3	(Brazil) Nelson Piquet Jr.	Hitech Piquet Sports	25	+8.000	15	
11	25	(Italy) Ferdinando Monfardini	Durango	25	+8.500	19	
12	2	(Turkey) Can Artam	iSport International	25	+10.100	14	
13	15	(United Kingdom) Fairuz Fauzy	DAMS	25	+12.800	22	
14	16	(Austria) Mathias Lauda	Coloni Motorsport	25	+13.600	21	
15	4	(Brazil) Alexandre Negrão	Hitech Piquet Sports	25	+17.800	1	
16	24	(Monaco) Clivio Piccione	Durango	25	+20.600	24	2
17	6	(Japan) Hiroki Yoshimoto	BCN Competición	25	+23.700	13	
18	21	(Spain) Sergio Hernández	Campos Racing	24	+1 lap	18	
19	1	(United States) Scott Speed	iSport International	23	+2 laps	20	
Ret	11	(France) Olivier Pla	DPR	16	Did not finish	2	
Ret	14	(France) José María López	DAMS	6	Did not finish	16	
Ret	19	(Spain) Borja García	Racing Engineering	4	Did not finish	11	
Ret	5	(Venezuela) Ernesto Viso	BCN Competición	4	Did not finish	3	
Ret	12	(Italy) Giorgio Mondini	DPR	2	Did not finish	23	
Fastest lap: Clivio Piccione (Durango) — 1:34.336 (on lap 25)

== Standings after the round ==
Drivers' Championship standings

	Pos.	Driver	Points
	1	(Finland) Heikki Kovalainen	79
	2	(Germany) Nico Rosberg	72
	3	(United States) Scott Speed	50
2	4	(France) Alexandre Prémat	43
3	5	(Switzerland) Neel Jani	40

Teams' Championship standings

	Pos.	Team	Points
	1	(France) ART Grand Prix	115
	2	(Netherlands) Arden International	92
	3	(United Kingdom) Super Nova International	62
	4	(United Kingdom) iSport International	52
1	5	(Spain) Racing Engineering	44

- Note: Only the top five positions are included for both sets of standings.

Previous round: 2005 Hockenheimring GP2 Series round	GP2 Series; 2005 season	Next round: 2005 Istanbul Park GP2 Series round
Previous round: 2004 Hungaroring F3000 round	Hungaroring GP2 round	Next round: 2006 Hungaroring GP2 Series round
