= 2005 Nürburgring GP2 Series round =

2005 GP2 race held in Germany

(Germany) 2005 Nürburgring GP2 round
Round details
- Round 4 of 12 rounds in the 2005 GP2 Series
- Location: Nürburgring, Nürburg, Germany
- Course: Permanent racing facility 5.148 km (3.200 mi)

GP2 Series

Feature race
- Date: 28 May 2005
- Laps: 33

Pole position
Driver	(Italy) Giorgio Pantano	Super Nova International
- Time: 1:43.862

Podium
First	(Finland) Heikki Kovalainen	Arden International
Second	(Italy) Giorgio Pantano	Super Nova International
Third	(Germany) Nico Rosberg	ART Grand Prix

Fastest lap
Driver	(United States) Scott Speed	iSport International
- Time: 1:44.992 (on lap 20)

Sprint race
- Date: 29 May 2005
- Laps: 24

Podium
First	(Monaco) Clivio Piccione	Durango
Second	(United Kingdom) Adam Carroll	Super Nova International
Third	(Brazil) Nelson Piquet Jr.	Hitech Piquet Sports

Fastest lap
Driver	(United States) Scott Speed	iSport International
- Time: 1:43.853 (on lap 20)

The 2005 European GP2 round was a GP2 Series motor race held on 28 and 29 May 2005 at the Nürburgring in Nürburg, Germany. It was the fourth race of the 2005 GP2 Series season. The race was used to support the 2005 European Grand Prix.

The first race was won by Heikki Kovalainen for Arden International, with Giorgio Pantano second for Super Nova International and Nico Rosberg finishing third for ART Grand Prix.

The second race was won by Clivio Piccione for Durango, with Adam Carroll for Super Nova International and Nelson Piquet Jr. for Hitech Piquet Sports also on the podium.

== Classification ==
=== Qualifying ===
Pos	No	Driver	Team	Time	Gap	Grid
1	7	(Italy) Giorgio Pantano	Super Nova International	1:43.862		1
2	17	(Italy) Gianmaria Bruni	Coloni Motorsport	1:44.128	+0.266	2
3	18	(Switzerland) Neel Jani	Racing Engineering	1:44.176	+0.314	3
4	14	(France) José María López	DAMS	1:44.266	+0.404	4
5	5	(Venezuela) Ernesto Viso	BCN Competición	1:44.477	+0.615	5
6	23	(France) Nicolas Lapierre	Arden International	1:44.739	+0.877	6
7	6	(Japan) Hiroki Yoshimoto	BCN Competición	1:44.748	+0.886	7
8	1	(United States) Scott Speed	iSport International	1:44.865	+1.003	8
9	11	(France) Olivier Pla	DPR	1:44.879	+1.017	9
10	8	(United Kingdom) Adam Carroll	Super Nova International	1:44.914	+1.052	10
11	9	(Germany) Nico Rosberg	ART Grand Prix	1:44.989	+1.127	11^{1}
12	3	(Brazil) Nelson Piquet Jr.	Hitech Piquet Sports	1:45.331	+1.469	12
13	12	(United Kingdom) Ryan Sharp	DPR	1:45.463	+1.601	13
14	24	(Monaco) Clivio Piccione	Durango	1:45.523	+1.661	14
15	20	(Spain) Juan Cruz Álvarez	Campos Racing	1:45.550	+1.688	15
16	19	(Spain) Borja García	Racing Engineering	1:45.661	+1.799	16
17	22	(Finland) Heikki Kovalainen	Arden International	1:45.737	+1.875	17^{2}
18	25	(Italy) Ferdinando Monfardini	Durango	1:45.789	+1.927	18
19	4	(Brazil) Alexandre Negrão	Hitech Piquet Sports	1:45.946	+2.084	19
20	21	(Spain) Sergio Hernández	Campos Racing	1:46.429	+2.567	20
21	2	(Turkey) Can Artam	iSport International	1:46.503	+2.641	21
22	10	(France) Alexandre Prémat	ART Grand Prix	1:46.589	+2.727	22^{3}
23	16	(Austria) Mathias Lauda	Coloni Motorsport	1:46.656	+2.794	23
24	15	(United Kingdom) Fairuz Fauzy	DAMS	1:47.266	+3.404	24
107% time: 1:51.132

Notes

- ^1 – Nico Rosberg (1:43.939 and 1:44.302) two fastest times deleted for speeding under yellow flags during. This demoted him from second to 11th on the grid.
- ^2 – Heikki Kovalainen (1:43.965 and 1:44.318) two fastest times deleted for speeding under yellow flags during. This demoted him from third to 17th on the grid.
- ^3 – Alexandre Prémat (1:44.598 and 1:44.904) two fastest times deleted for speeding under yellow flags during. This demoted him from eighth to 22nd on the grid.

=== Feature race ===
Pos	No	Driver	Team	Laps	Time/Retired	Grid	Points
1	22	(Finland) Heikki Kovalainen	Arden International	33	1:01:43.066	17	10
2	7	(Italy) Giorgio Pantano	Super Nova International	33	+1.832	1	10
3	9	(Germany) Nico Rosberg	ART Grand Prix	33	+24.953	11	6
4	10	(France) Alexandre Prémat	ART Grand Prix	33	+40.520	22	5
5	3	(Brazil) Nelson Piquet Jr.	Hitech Piquet Sports	33	+41.160	12	4
6	18	(Switzerland) Neel Jani	Racing Engineering	33	+49.037	3	3
7	24	(Monaco) Clivio Piccione	Durango	33	+49.138	14	2
8	17	(Italy) Gianmaria Bruni	Coloni Motorsport	33	+54.299	2	1
9	12	(United Kingdom) Ryan Sharp	DPR	33	+1:07.919	13	
10	16	(Austria) Mathias Lauda	Coloni Motorsport	33	+1:08.692	23	
11	6	(Japan) Hiroki Yoshimoto	BCN Competición	33	+1:17.472	7	
12	23	(France) Nicolas Lapierre	Arden International	33	+1:19.997	6	
13	14	(France) José María López	DAMS	33	+1:20.750	4	
14	15	(United Kingdom) Fairuz Fauzy	DAMS	33	+1:25.504	24	
15	21	(Spain) Sergio Hernández	Campos Racing	33	+1:32.110	20	
16	1	(United States) Scott Speed	iSport International	32	+1 lap	8	2
17	2	(Turkey) Can Artam	iSport International	32	+1 lap	21	
18	20	(Spain) Juan Cruz Álvarez	Campos Racing	30	+3 laps/DNF	15	
Ret	5	(Venezuela) Ernesto Viso	BCN Competición	8	DNF	5	
Ret	11	(France) Olivier Pla	DPR	0	DNF	9	
Ret	8	(United Kingdom) Adam Carroll	Super Nova International	0	DNF	10	
Ret	19	(Spain) Borja García	Racing Engineering	0	DNF	16	
Ret	25	(Italy) Ferdinando Monfardini	Durango	0	DNF	18	
Ret	4	(Brazil) Alexandre Negrão	Hitech Piquet Sports	0	DNF	19	
Fastest lap: Scott Speed (iSport International) 1:44.992 (on lap 20)

=== Sprint race ===
Pos	No	Driver	Team	Laps	Time/Retired	Grid	Points
1	24	(Monaco) Clivio Piccione	Durango	24	42:42.210	2	6
2	8	(United Kingdom) Adam Carroll	Super Nova International	24	+6.861	21	5
3	3	(Brazil) Nelson Piquet Jr.	Hitech Piquet Sports	24	+7.487	4	4
4	9	(Germany) Nico Rosberg	ART Grand Prix	24	+7.727	6	3
5	21	(Spain) Sergio Hernández	Campos Racing	24	+14.867	15	2
6	25	(Italy) Ferdinando Monfardini	Durango	24	+17.270	23	1
7	7	(Italy) Giorgio Pantano	Super Nova International	24	+21.005	7	
8	11	(France) Olivier Pla	DPR	24	+22.896	20	
9	12	(United Kingdom) Ryan Sharp	DPR	24	+35.319	9	
10	15	(United Kingdom) Fairuz Fauzy	DAMS	24	+56.231	14	
11	5	(Venezuela) Ernesto Viso	BCN Competición	24	+1:20.910	19	
12	1	(United States) Scott Speed	iSport International	23	+1 lap	16	2
13	18	(Switzerland) Neel Jani	Racing Engineering	22	+2 laps/DNF	3	
14	14	(France) José María López	DAMS	22	+2 laps	13	
15	20	(Spain) Juan Cruz Álvarez	Campos Racing	22	+2 laps	18	
Ret	2	(Turkey) Can Artam	iSport International	17	DNF	17	
Ret	17	(Italy) Gianmaria Bruni	Coloni Motorsport	16	DNF	1	
Ret	4	(Brazil) Alexandre Negrão	Hitech Piquet Sports	6	DNF	24	
Ret	22	(Finland) Heikki Kovalainen	Arden International	2	DNF	8	
Ret	23	(France) Nicolas Lapierre	Arden International	1	DNF	12	
Ret	10	(France) Alexandre Prémat	ART Grand Prix	1	DNF	5	
Ret	16	(Austria) Mathias Lauda	Coloni Motorsport	1	DNF	10	
DNS	6	(Japan) Hiroki Yoshimoto	BCN Competición	0	Did not start	11	
EX	19	(Spain) Borja García	Racing Engineering	0	Excluded^{1}	22	
Fastest lap: Scott Speed (iSport International) 1:43.853 (on lap 20)

Notes

- ^1 – Borja García was excluded from the sprint race for causing a five-car accident at the start of the feature race.

== Standings after the round ==
Drivers' Championship standings

	Pos	Driver	Points
	1	(Finland) Heikki Kovalainen	38
1	2	(United States) Scott Speed	29
1	3	(United Kingdom) Adam Carroll	28
2	4	(Italy) Gianmaria Bruni	27
1	5	(Germany) Nico Rosberg	21

Teams' Championship standings

	Pos	Team	Points
	1	(Netherlands) Arden International	42
2	2	(United Kingdom) Super Nova International	38
2	3	(France) ART Grand Prix	33
1	4	(United Kingdom) iSport International	31
3	5	(Italy) Coloni Motorsport	30

- Note: Only the top five positions are included for both sets of standings.

Previous round: 2005 Monaco GP2 Series round	GP2 Series; 2005 season	Next round: 2005 Magny-Cours GP2 Series round
Previous round: 2004 Nürburgring F3000 round	Nürburgring GP2 round	Next round: 2006 European GP2 Series round
