= 2005 Catalunya GP2 Series round =

(Spain) 2005 Spanish GP2 round
Round details
- Round 2 of 12 rounds in the 2005 GP2 Series
- Location: Circuit de Catalunya, Montmeló, Catalonia, Spain
- Course: Permanent racing facility 4.627 km (2.875 mi)

GP2 Series

Feature race
- Date: 7 May 2005
- Laps: 39

Pole position
Driver	(United States) Scott Speed	iSport International
- Time: 1:25.486

Podium
First	(Italy) Gianmaria Bruni	Coloni Motorsport
Second	(United States) Scott Speed	iSport International
Third	(Finland) Heikki Kovalainen	Arden International

Fastest lap
Driver	(Germany) Nico Rosberg	ART Grand Prix
- Time: 1:25.875 (on lap 38)

Sprint race
- Date: 8 May 2005
- Laps: 18

Podium
First	(Argentina) José María López	DAMS
Second	(Brazil) Nelson Piquet Jr.	Hitech Piquet Sports
Third	(United States) Scott Speed	iSport International

Fastest lap
Driver	(United Kingdom) Ryan Sharp	DPR
- Time: 1:26.251 (on lap 17)

The 2005 Spanish GP2 round was a GP2 Series motor race held on 7 and 8 May 2005 at the Circuit de Catalunya in Montmeló, Catalonia, Spain. It was the second race of the 2005 GP2 Series season. The race was used to support the 2005 Spanish Grand Prix.

The first race was won by Gianmaria Bruni for Coloni Motorsport, with Scott Speed second for iSport International and Heikki Kovalainen finishing third for Arden International.

The second race was won by José María López for DAMS, with Nelson Piquet Jr. for Hitech Piquet Sports and Scott Speed also on the podium.

== Classification ==
=== Qualifying ===
Pos	No	Driver	Team	Time	Gap	Grid
1	1	(United States) Scott Speed	iSport International	1:25.486		1
2	17	(Italy) Gianmaria Bruni	Coloni Motorsport	1:25.934	+0.448	2
3	14	(Argentina) José María López	DAMS	1:26.143	+0.657	3
4	3	(Brazil) Nelson Piquet Jr.	Hitech Piquet Sports	1:26.189	+0.703	4
5	11	(France) Olivier Pla	DPR	1:26.209	+0.723	5
6	20	(Spain) Juan Cruz Álvarez	Campos Racing	1:26.241	+0.755	6
7	12	(United Kingdom) Ryan Sharp	DPR	1:26.298	+0.812	7
8	23	(France) Nicolas Lapierre	Arden International	1:26.422	+0.936	8
9	19	(Spain) Borja García	Racing Engineering	1:26.464	+0.978	9
10	9	(Germany) Nico Rosberg	ART Grand Prix	1:26.465	+0.979	10
11	22	(Finland) Heikki Kovalainen	Arden International	1:26.512	+1.026	11
12	8	(United Kingdom) Adam Carroll	Super Nova International	1:26.717	+1.231	12
13	18	(Switzerland) Neel Jani	Racing Engineering	1:26.766	+1.280	13
14	10	(France) Alexandre Prémat	ART Grand Prix	1:26.822	+1.336	14
15	24	(Monaco) Clivio Piccione	Durango	1:26.834	+1.348	15
16	6	(Japan) Hiroki Yoshimoto	BCN Competición	1:26.849	+1.363	16
17	7	(Italy) Giorgio Pantano	Super Nova International	1:26.987	+1.501	17
18	25	(Italy) Ferdinando Monfardini	Durango	1:27.092	+1.606	18
19	21	(Spain) Sergio Hernández	Campos Racing	1:27.094	+1.608	19
20	5	(Venezuela) Ernesto Viso	BCN Competición	1:27.367	+1.881	20
21	16	(Austria) Mathias Lauda	Coloni Motorsport	1:27.627	+2.141	21
22	4	(Brazil) Alexandre Negrão	Hitech Piquet Sports	1:27.752	+2.266	22
23	2	(Turkey) Can Artam	iSport International	1:28.806	+3.320	23
24	15	(United Kingdom) Fairuz Fauzy	DAMS	No time		24
107% time: 1:31.470

=== Feature race ===
Pos	No	Driver	Team	Laps	Time/Retired	Grid	Points
1	17	(Italy) Gianmaria Bruni	Coloni Motorsport	39	58:07.348	2	10
2	1	(United States) Scott Speed	iSport International	39	+1.203	1	10
3	22	(Finland) Heikki Kovalainen	Arden International	39	+7.789	11	6
4	18	(Switzerland) Neel Jani	Racing Engineering	39	+18.165	13	5
5	3	(Brazil) Nelson Piquet Jr.	Hitech Piquet Sports	39	+23.594	4	4
6	14	(Argentina) José María López	DAMS	39	+25.992	3	3
7	8	(United Kingdom) Adam Carroll	Super Nova International	39	+33.740	12	2
8	4	(Brazil) Alexandre Negrão	Hitech Piquet Sports	39	+36.881	22	1
9	9	(Germany) Nico Rosberg	ART Grand Prix	39	+37.197	10	2
10	10	(France) Alexandre Prémat	ART Grand Prix	39	+46.868	14	
11	23	(France) Nicolas Lapierre	Arden International	39	+1:06.152	8	
12	15	(United Kingdom) Fairuz Fauzy	DAMS	39	+1:29.143	24	
13	7	(Italy) Giorgio Pantano	Super Nova International	38	+1 lap	17	
Ret	24	(Monaco) Clivio Piccione	Durango	34	DNF	15	
Ret	12	(United Kingdom) Ryan Sharp	DPR	30	DNF	7	
Ret	11	(France) Olivier Pla	DPR	29	DNF	5	
Ret	16	(Austria) Mathias Lauda	Coloni Motorsport	28	DNF	21	
Ret	2	(Turkey) Can Artam	iSport International	26	DNF	23	
Ret	6	(Japan) Hiroki Yoshimoto	BCN Competición	19	DNF	16	
Ret	5	(Venezuela) Ernesto Viso	BCN Competición	18	DNF	20	
Ret	21	(Spain) Sergio Hernández	Campos Racing	13	DNF	19	
Ret	20	(Spain) Juan Cruz Álvarez	Campos Racing	4	DNF	6	
Ret	19	(Spain) Borja García	Racing Engineering	1	DNF	9	
Ret	25	(Italy) Ferdinando Monfardini	Durango	1	DNF	18	
Fastest lap: Nico Rosberg (ART Grand Prix) 1:25.875 (on lap 38)

=== Sprint race ===
Pos	No	Driver	Team	Laps	Time/Retired	Grid	Points
1	14	(Argentina) José María López	DAMS	18	30:10.213	3	6
2	3	(Brazil) Nelson Piquet Jr.	Hitech Piquet Sports	18	+2.969	4	5
3	1	(United States) Scott Speed	iSport International	18	+3.279	7	4
4	9	(Germany) Nico Rosberg	ART Grand Prix	18	+7.780	9	3
5	18	(Switzerland) Neel Jani	Racing Engineering	18	+10.215	5	2
6	8	(United Kingdom) Adam Carroll	Super Nova International	18	+11.240	2	1
7	15	(United Kingdom) Fairuz Fauzy	DAMS	18	+18.379	12	
8	24	(Monaco) Clivio Piccione	Durango	18	+18.943	14	
9	23	(France) Nicolas Lapierre	Arden International	18	+19.692	11	
10	19	(Spain) Borja García	Racing Engineering	18	+21.228	23	
11	25	(Italy) Ferdinando Monfardini	Durango	18	+24.249	24	
12	20	(Spain) Juan Cruz Álvarez	Campos Racing	18	+24.661	22	
13	16	(Austria) Mathias Lauda	Coloni Motorsport	18	+25.993	17	
14	7	(Italy) Giorgio Pantano	Super Nova International	18	+26.502	13	
15	4	(Brazil) Alexandre Negrão	Hitech Piquet Sports	18	+30.358	1	
16	12	(United Kingdom) Ryan Sharp	DPR	18	+35.475	15	2
17	6	(Japan) Hiroki Yoshimoto	BCN Competición	17	+1 lap	19	
18	21	(Spain) Sergio Hernández	Campos Racing	16	+2 laps	21	
Ret	2	(Turkey) Can Artam	iSport International	11	DNF	18	
Ret	17	(Italy) Gianmaria Bruni	Coloni Motorsport	8	DNF	8	
Ret	10	(France) Alexandre Prémat	ART Grand Prix	4	DNF	10	
Ret	11	(France) Olivier Pla	DPR	1	DNF	16	
Ret	22	(Finland) Heikki Kovalainen	Arden International	0	DNF	6	
Ret	5	(Venezuela) Ernesto Viso	BCN Competición	0	DNF	20	
Fastest lap: Ryan Sharp (DPR) 1:26.251 (on lap 17)

== Standings after the round ==
Drivers' Championship standings

	Pos	Driver	Points
	1	(Finland) Heikki Kovalainen	20
4	2	(United States) Scott Speed	20
1	3	(Italy) Gianmaria Bruni	18
1	4	(Argentina) José María López	17
3	5	(United Kingdom) Adam Carroll	13

Teams' Championship standings

	Pos	Team	Points
	1	(Netherlands) Arden International	24
4	2	(United Kingdom) iSport International	20
2	3	(Italy) Coloni Motorsport	18
	4	(France) DAMS	17
3	5	(United Kingdom) Super Nova International	13

- Note: Only the top five positions are included for both sets of standings.

Previous round: 2005 Imola GP2 Series round	GP2 Series; 2005 season	Next round: 2005 Monaco GP2 Series round
Previous round: 2004 Barcelona F3000 round	Catalunya GP2 round	Next round: 2006 Catalunya GP2 Series round
