= 2005 Magny-Cours GP2 Series round =

Car race

(France) 2005 Magny-Cours GP2 round
Round details
- Round 5 of 12 rounds in the 2005 GP2 Series
- Location: Circuit de Nevers Magny-Cours, Magny-Cours, France
- Course: Permanent racing facility 4.411 km (2.741 mi)

GP2 Series

Feature race
- Date: 2 July 2005
- Laps: 41

Pole position
Driver	(France) Alexandre Prémat	ART Grand Prix
- Time: 1:25.132

Podium
First	(Finland) Heikki Kovalainen	Arden International
Second	(France) José María López	DAMS
Third	(France) Nicolas Lapierre	Arden International

Fastest lap
Driver	(Italy) Gianmaria Bruni	Coloni Motorsport
- Time: 1:27.809 (on lap 37)

Sprint race
- Date: 3 July 2005
- Laps: 28

Podium
First	(Germany) Nico Rosberg	ART Grand Prix
Second	(Japan) Hiroki Yoshimoto	BCN Competición
Third	(Finland) Heikki Kovalainen	Arden International

Fastest lap
Driver	(Italy) Gianmaria Bruni (Note: Nelson Piquet Jr. set the fastest lap, but after disqualification the points were given to Gianmaria Bruni.)	Coloni Motorsport
- Time: 1:27.682 (on lap 3)

The 2005 French GP2 round was a GP2 Series motor race held on 2 and 3 July 2005 at the Circuit de Nevers Magny-Cours in Magny-Cours, France. It was the fifth race of the 2005 GP2 Series season. The race was used to support the 2005 French Grand Prix.

The first race was won by Heikki Kovalainen for Arden International, with José María López second for DAMS and Nicolas Lapierre finishing third for Arden.

The second race was won by Nico Rosberg for ART Grand Prix, with Hiroki Yoshimoto for BCN Competición and Heikki Kovalainen for Arden also on the podium.

== Classification ==
=== Qualifying ===
Pos	No	Driver	Team	Time	Gap	Grid
1	10	(France) Alexandre Prémat	ART Grand Prix	1:25.132		1
2	14	(France) José María López	DAMS	1:25.209	+0.077	2
3	9	(Germany) Nico Rosberg	ART Grand Prix	1:25.245	+0.133	3
4	22	(Finland) Heikki Kovalainen	Arden International	1:25.402	+0.270	4
5	8	(United Kingdom) Adam Carroll	Super Nova International	1:25.525	+0.393	5
6	1	(United States) Scott Speed	iSport International	1:25.620	+0.488	6
7	23	(France) Nicolas Lapierre	Arden International	1:25.848	+0.716	7
8	3	(Brazil) Nelson Piquet Jr.	Hitech Piquet Sports	1:25.863	+0.731	8
9	7	(Italy) Giorgio Pantano	Super Nova International	1:25.867	+0.735	9
10	6	(Japan) Hiroki Yoshimoto	BCN Competición	1:26.019	+0.887	10
11	17	(Italy) Gianmaria Bruni	Coloni Motorsport	1:26.096	+0.964	11
12	11	(France) Olivier Pla	DPR	1:26.158	+1.026	12
13	15	(United Kingdom) Fairuz Fauzy	DAMS	1:26.519	+1.387	13
14	19	(Spain) Borja García	Racing Engineering	1:26.766	+1.634	14
15	18	(Switzerland) Neel Jani	Racing Engineering	1:26.822	+1.690	15
16	5	(Venezuela) Ernesto Viso	BCN Competición	1:26.858	+1.726	24^{1}
17	25	(Italy) Ferdinando Monfardini	Durango	1:27.080	+1.948	16
18	20	(Spain) Juan Cruz Álvarez	Campos Racing	1:27.173	+2.041	17
19	4	(Brazil) Alexandre Negrão	Hitech Piquet Sports	1:27.178	+2.046	18
20	21	(Spain) Sergio Hernández	Campos Racing	1:27.247	+2.115	19
21	12	(United Kingdom) Ryan Sharp	DPR	1:27.255	+2.123	20
22	16	(Austria) Mathias Lauda	Coloni Motorsport	1:27.478	+2.346	21
23	24	(Monaco) Clivio Piccione	Durango	1:27.691	+2.559	22
24	2	(Turkey) Can Artam	iSport International	1:28.695	+3.563	23
107% time: 1:31.091

Notes

- ^1 – Ernesto Viso was given a ten-place grid penalty for causing collision with Mathias Lauda in the sprint race in Nürburgring.

=== Feature race ===
Pos	No	Driver	Team	Laps	Time/Retired	Grid	Points
1	22	(Finland) Heikki Kovalainen	Arden International	41	1:02:55.458	4	10
2	14	(France) José María López	DAMS	41	+3.300	2	8
3	23	(France) Nicolas Lapierre	Arden International	41	+7.600	7	6
4	8	(United Kingdom) Adam Carroll	Super Nova International	41	+14.900	5	5
5	18	(Switzerland) Neel Jani	Racing Engineering	41	+22.400	15	4
6	6	(Japan) Hiroki Yoshimoto	BCN Competición	41	+22.900	10	3
7	9	(Germany) Nico Rosberg	ART Grand Prix	41	+23.100	3	2
8	24	(Monaco) Clivio Piccione	Durango	41	+29.300	22	1
9	10	(France) Alexandre Prémat	ART Grand Prix	41	+32.700	1	2
10	7	(Italy) Giorgio Pantano	Super Nova International	41	+36.200	9	
11	5	(Venezuela) Ernesto Viso	BCN Competición	41	+36.600	24	
12	25	(Italy) Ferdinando Monfardini	Durango	41	+37.100	16	
13	21	(Spain) Sergio Hernández	Campos Racing	41	+45.000	19	
14	15	(United Kingdom) Fairuz Fauzy	DAMS	41	+50.800	13	
15	1	(United States) Scott Speed	iSport International	41	+51.800	6	
16	16	(Austria) Mathias Lauda	Coloni Motorsport	41	+1:00.700	21	
17	2	(Turkey) Can Artam	iSport International	41	+1:28.000	23	
18	17	(Italy) Gianmaria Bruni	Coloni Motorsport	40	+1 lap	11	2
19	12	(United Kingdom) Ryan Sharp	DPR	40	+1 lap	20	
Ret	19	(Spain) Borja García	Racing Engineering	30	DNF	14	
Ret	3	(Brazil) Nelson Piquet Jr.	Hitech Piquet Sports	24	DNF	8	
Ret	11	(France) Olivier Pla	DPR	15	DNF	12	
Ret	20	(Spain) Juan Cruz Álvarez	Campos Racing	9	DNF	17	
Ret	4	(Brazil) Alexandre Negrão	Hitech Piquet Sports	1	DNF	18	
Fastest lap: Gianmaria Bruni (Coloni Motorsport) 1:27.809 (on lap 37)

=== Sprint race ===
Pos	No	Driver	Team	Laps	Time/Retired	Grid	Points
1	9	(Germany) Nico Rosberg	ART Grand Prix	28	41:30.173	2	6
2	6	(Japan) Hiroki Yoshimoto	BCN Competición	28	+25.300	3	5
3	22	(Finland) Heikki Kovalainen	Arden International	28	+25.800	8	4
4	18	(Switzerland) Neel Jani	Racing Engineering	28	+34.900	4	3
5	23	(France) Nicolas Lapierre	Arden International	28	+39.200	6	2
6	8	(United Kingdom) Adam Carroll	Super Nova International	28	+42.000	5	1
7	7	(Italy) Giorgio Pantano	Super Nova International	28	+45.900	10	
8	5	(Venezuela) Ernesto Viso	BCN Competición	28	+1:01.800	11	
9	11	(France) Olivier Pla	DPR	28	+1:05.300	22	
10	15	(United Kingdom) Fairuz Fauzy	DAMS	28	+1:05.900	14	
11	17	(Italy) Gianmaria Bruni	Coloni Motorsport	28	+1:07.200	18	2
12	19	(Spain) Borja García	Racing Engineering	28	+1:09.300	20	
13	4	(Brazil) Alexandre Negrão	Hitech Piquet Sports	28	+1:11.000	24	
14	21	(Spain) Sergio Hernández	Campos Racing	28	+1:19.500	13	
15	16	(Austria) Mathias Lauda	Coloni Motorsport	28	+1:27.700	16	
16	2	(Turkey) Can Artam	iSport International	28	+1:30.800	17	
17	25	(Italy) Ferdinando Monfardini	Durango	27	+1 lap/DNF	12	
18	1	(United States) Scott Speed	iSport International	26	+2 laps	15	
Ret	10	(France) Alexandre Prémat	ART Grand Prix	23	DNF	9	
Ret	14	(France) José María López	DAMS	22	DNF	7	
Ret	12	(United Kingdom) Ryan Sharp	DPR	6	DNF	19	
DSQ	3	(Brazil) Nelson Piquet Jr.	Hitech Piquet Sports	27	Disqualified^{1}	21	
DSQ	24	(Monaco) Clivio Piccione	Durango	26	Disqualified^{1}	1	
DSQ	20	(Spain) Juan Cruz Álvarez	Campos Racing	23	Disqualified^{1}	23	
Fastest lap: Gianmaria Bruni (Coloni Motorsport) 1:27.682 (on lap 3)

Notes

- ^1 – Nelson Piquet Jr., Clivio Piccione and Juan Cruz Álvarez was disqualified from the race because their team broke the rules and changed all four tires during the race.

== Standings after the round ==
Drivers' Championship standings

	Pos	Driver	Points
	1	(Finland) Heikki Kovalainen	52
1	2	(United Kingdom) Adam Carroll	34
1	3	(Italy) Gianmaria Bruni	31
1	4	(Germany) Nico Rosberg	29
3	5	(United States) Scott Speed	29

Teams' Championship standings

	Pos	Team	Points
	1	(Netherlands) Arden International	64
	2	(United Kingdom) Super Nova International	44
	3	(France) ART Grand Prix	43
1	4	(Italy) Coloni Motorsport	34
1	5	(United Kingdom) iSport International	31

- Note: Only the top five positions are included for both sets of standings.

== See also ==
- 2005 French Grand Prix
- 2005 Magny-Cours Porsche Supercup round

== Notes ==
Previous round: 2005 Nürburgring GP2 Series round	GP2 Series; 2005 season	Next round: 2005 Silverstone GP2 Series round
Previous round: 2004 Magny-Cours F3000 round	Magny-Cours GP2 round	Next round: 2006 Magny-Cours GP2 Series round
