= 2005 Monaco GP2 Series round =

Motor racing competition

2005 Monaco GP2 round
Round details
- Round 3 of 12 rounds in the 2005 GP2 Series
- Location: Circuit de Monaco, Monte Carlo, Monaco
- Course: Street circuit 3.340 km (2.08 mi)

GP2 Series

Feature race
- Date: 21 May 2005
- Laps: 44

Pole position
Driver	(Finland) Heikki Kovalainen	Arden International
- Time: 1:24.665

Podium
First	(United Kingdom) Adam Carroll	Super Nova International
Second	(Italy) Gianmaria Bruni	Coloni Motorsport
Third	(Germany) Nico Rosberg	ART Grand Prix

Fastest lap
Driver	(Finland) Heikki Kovalainen	Arden International
- Time: 1:23.864 (on lap 44)

Sprint race

The 2005 Monaco GP2 round was a GP2 Series motor race held on 21 May 2005 at the Circuit de Monaco in Monte Carlo, Monaco. It was the third race of the 2005 GP2 Series season. The race was used to support the 2005 Monaco Grand Prix.

There was only one race, held on Saturday. Polesitter Heikki Kovalainen finished fifth after an unsuccessful pit-stop, but was able to set the fastest lap. Irishman Adam Carroll, who started third, won the race by a margin of 0.657 seconds from Gianmaria Bruni. Nico Rosberg finished third, to score his first GP2 podium finish.

== Classification ==
=== Qualifying ===
Pos	No	Driver	Team	Time	Gap	Grid
1	22	(Finland) Heikki Kovalainen	Arden International	1:24.665		1
2	17	(Italy) Gianmaria Bruni	Coloni Motorsport	1:24.724	+0.059	2
3	8	(United Kingdom) Adam Carroll	Super Nova International	1:24.751	+0.086	3
4	11	(France) Olivier Pla	DPR	1:24.996	+0.331	4
5	1	(United States) Scott Speed	iSport International	1:25.405	+0.740	5
6	24	(Monaco) Clivio Piccione	Durango	1:25.483	+0.818	6
7	9	(Germany) Nico Rosberg	ART Grand Prix	1:25.494	+0.829	7
8	7	(Italy) Giorgio Pantano	Super Nova International	1:25.709	+1.044	8
9	18	(Switzerland) Neel Jani	Racing Engineering	1:25.918	+1.253	9
10	23	(France) Nicolas Lapierre	Arden International	1:26.083	+1.418	10
11	10	(France) Alexandre Prémat	ART Grand Prix	1:26.287	+1.622	11
12	20	(Spain) Juan Cruz Álvarez	Campos Racing	1:26.463	+1.798	12
13	25	(Italy) Ferdinando Monfardini	Durango	1:27.168	+2.503	13
14	19	(Spain) Borja García	Racing Engineering	1:27.260	+2.595	14
15	5	(Venezuela) Ernesto Viso	BCN Competición	1:27.307	+2.642	15
16	16	(Austria) Mathias Lauda	Coloni Motorsport	1:28.401	+3.736	16
17	15	(United Kingdom) Fairuz Fauzy	DAMS	1:28.853	+4.188	17
18	21	(Spain) Sergio Hernández	Campos Racing	1:28.947	+4.282	18
19	2	(Turkey) Can Artam	iSport International	1:29.941	+5.276	19
20	12	(United Kingdom) Ryan Sharp	DPR	1:36.477	+11.812	20
21	4	(Brazil) Alexandre Negrão	Hitech Piquet Sports	1:55.008	+30.343	21
22	3	(Brazil) Nelson Piquet Jr.	Hitech Piquet Sports	2:01.514	+36.849	22
23	14	(France) José María López	DAMS	No time		23
24	6	(Japan) Hiroki Yoshimoto	BCN Competición	No time		24
107% time: 1:30.591

=== Race ===
Pos	No	Driver	Team	Laps	Time/Retired	Grid	Points
1	8	(United Kingdom) Adam Carroll	Super Nova International	44	1:04:41.326	3	10
2	17	(Italy) Gianmaria Bruni	Coloni Motorsport	44	+0.654	2	8
3	9	(Germany) Nico Rosberg	ART Grand Prix	44	+1.101	7	6
4	1	(United States) Scott Speed	iSport International	44	+18.452	5	5
5	22	(Finland) Heikki Kovalainen	Arden International	44	+53.398	1	8
6	16	(Austria) Mathias Lauda	Coloni Motorsport	43	+1 lap	16	3
7	2	(Turkey) Can Artam	iSport International	43	+1 lap	19	2
8	21	(Spain) Sergio Hernández	Campos Racing	42	+2 laps	18	1
9	11	(France) Olivier Pla	DPR	41	+3 laps	4	
10	19	(Spain) Borja García	Racing Engineering	40	+4 laps/DNF	14	
11	3	(Brazil) Nelson Piquet Jr.	Hitech Piquet Sports	40	+4 laps/DNF	22	
12	4	(Brazil) Alexandre Negrão	Hitech Piquet Sports	40	+4 laps/DNF	21	
Ret	23	(France) Nicolas Lapierre	Arden International	33	DNF	10	
Ret	10	(France) Alexandre Prémat	ART Grand Prix	23	DNF	11	
Ret	24	(Monaco) Clivio Piccione	Durango	11	DNF	6	
Ret	18	(Switzerland) Neel Jani	Racing Engineering	10	DNF	9	
Ret	14	(France) José María López	DAMS	10	DNF	23	
Ret	12	(United Kingdom) Ryan Sharp	DPR	8	DNF	20	
Ret	15	(United Kingdom) Fairuz Fauzy	DAMS	6	DNF	17	
Ret	7	(Italy) Giorgio Pantano	Super Nova International	0	DNF	8	
Ret	20	(Spain) Juan Cruz Álvarez	Campos Racing	0	DNF	12	
DSQ	5	(Venezuela) Ernesto Viso	BCN Competición	7	Disqualified^{1}	15	
DNS	25	(Italy) Ferdinando Monfardini	Durango	0	Did not start	13	
DNS	6	(Japan) Hiroki Yoshimoto	BCN Competición	0	Did not start	24	
Fastest lap: Heikki Kovalainen (Arden International) 1:23.864 (on lap 44)

Notes

- ^1 – Ernesto Viso was disqualified for exiting pit lane under red light.

== Standings after the round ==
Drivers' Championship standings

	Pos	Driver	Points
	1	(Finland) Heikki Kovalainen	28
1	2	(Italy) Gianmaria Bruni	26
1	3	(United States) Scott Speed	25
1	4	(United Kingdom) Adam Carroll	23
1	5	(France) José María López	17

Teams' Championship standings

	Pos	Team	Points
	1	(Netherlands) Arden International	32
1	2	(Italy) Coloni Motorsport	29
1	3	(United Kingdom) iSport International	27
1	4	(United Kingdom) Super Nova International	23
1	5	(France) ART Grand Prix	19

- Note: Only the top five positions are included for both sets of standings.

== See also ==
- 2005 Monaco Grand Prix
- 2005 Monaco Porsche Supercup round
- 2005 Monaco Grand Prix Formula Three

Previous round: 2005 Catalunya GP2 Series round	GP2 Series; 2005 season	Next round: 2005 Nürburgring GP2 Series round
Previous round: 2004 Monaco F3000 round	Monaco GP2 round	Next round: 2006 Monaco GP2 Series round
