= 2005 GP2 Series =

Season of Formula One feeder championship

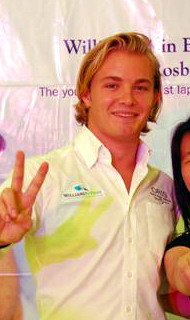
Nico Rosberg (pictured in 2006), won the inaugural championship.

The 2005 GP2 Series season was the thirty-ninth season of the second-tier of Formula One feeder championship and also first season under the GP2 Series moniker. The season started in Imola, Italy on 23 April, and ended in Sakhir, Bahrain on 30 September. The season was won by the German Nico Rosberg, with the Finn Heikki Kovalainen finishing second.

2005 was the first season of the newly renamed Formula One feeder series, from Formula 3000 to GP2. The inaugural season did not feature reigning F3000 champion Vitantonio Liuzzi, because the Italian was driving for Red Bull Racing in Formula One. The series did feature two former F1 drivers, Italians Gianmaria Bruni and Giorgio Pantano, driving for Coloni and SuperNova respectively.

== Season summary ==
In the opening race at Imola, there were a number of mechanical problems and with organisers afraid of trouble at the start, the rolling start was used in both races despite the weather being dry. Nicolas Lapierre had taken his inaugural pole position but he was out before the race had started due to mechanical problems. The race was won by his team-mate Heikki Kovalainen.

After the first weekend, it was decided that the points for the fastest lap would only be awarded if the driver was classified. This was due to the event in the Imola sprint race, where Lapierre started with a fuel load with which he wouldn't have been able to finish, set a fastest lap and retired soon after.

At Montmeló, the drivers could finally experience standing starts. F1 refugee Bruni won the feature race and José María López the sprint race. The first four races had been won by four drivers in four teams, highlighting that the field had many competitive drivers. Adam Carroll was the first driver to take a second victory after he won at Monaco, where only one race was held.

At Nürburgring, the sprint race was extended from 80 to 120 kilometres. This coincided with F1 dropping its second qualifying session on Sunday morning. The sprint race turned to be one of the most exciting of the season, with Monegasque Clivio Piccione winning.

Heikki Kovalainen was the top driver early in the season, winning three of the first five feature races. However, the season took a turnaround at Magny-Cours, where ART Grand Prix started going strong. Tactical errors caused them to lose the feature race, but Nico Rosberg gave them their first win at the sprint. Rosberg went on to win the next two feature races, while Olivier Pla won both sprints having started from pole position in both of them.

At the qualifying of the Hungaroring race, ART cars were disqualified for illegal position of their steering rack. They were sent to back of the grid but it didn't stop them taking points finishes in the feature and 1-2 in the sprint race, where Alexandre Prémat won his first race. Neel Jani joined the winners' list in the feature race.

Prémat also won the next race at Istanbul, while championship leading duo Kovalainen and Rosberg finished outside the points. The sprint race started in wet conditions but dried out, so tyre changes were necessary. Kovalainen did that move perfectly and won the race having started 10th. Rosberg jumped from 17th to 3rd.

Kovalainen and Jani won races at Monza but Rosberg took the most points with two second places and two fastest laps. Nelson Piquet Jr. then won the feature race at Spa-Francorchamps while Rosberg took the championship lead from Kovalainen who spun off on the last lap while battling for eighth place and pole for Sunday's race. Carroll led the sprint race from the start but following accidents involving Ernesto Viso, Hiroki Yoshimoto and Jani the race was stopped early and only half points were awarded. Viso still ended in 3rd position thanks to countback rule.

The championship was decided in Bahrain which held the only race not supporting F1. Rosberg led Kovalainen by three points and increased his lead by taking pole position. Rosberg also won the race and clinched the title as Kovalainen was 3rd. Rosberg then also won the sprint race, becoming the first driver in the series to win both races during an event.

== Teams and drivers ==
All of the teams used the Dallara GP2/05 chassis with Renault-badged 4.0 litre (244 cu in) naturally-aspirated Mecachrome V8 engines in 2005 in order to keep the field fair.

As this was the inaugural season in the series, car numbers were distributed by a pre-season session held at Circuit Paul Ricard on 6 April. The fastest driver got number 1, his team-mate number 2, next best driver number 3 etc.

| Team | No. | Driver name | Rounds |
|---|---|---|---|
| (United Kingdom) iSport International | 1 | (United States) Scott Speed | All |
| (United Kingdom) iSport International | 2 | (Turkey) Can Artam | All |
| (United Kingdom) Hitech Piquet Sports (Note: Hitech Piquet Sports competed under a British licence. However, before the Istanbul round, it was announced that this partnership had ended and that Piquet Sports would manage the team for the rest of the season. Despite this, team would continue carrying the Hitech name until the end of the season.) | 3 | (Brazil) Nelson Piquet Jr. | All |
| (United Kingdom) Hitech Piquet Sports | 4 | (Brazil) Alexandre Negrão | All |
| (Spain) BCN Competición | 5 | (Venezuela) Ernesto Viso | All |
| (Spain) BCN Competición | 6 | (Japan) Hiroki Yoshimoto | All |
| (United Kingdom) Super Nova International | 7 | (Italy) Giorgio Pantano | All |
| (United Kingdom) Super Nova International | 8 | (United Kingdom) Adam Carroll | All |
| (France) ART Grand Prix | 9 | (Germany) Nico Rosberg | All |
| (France) ART Grand Prix | 10 | (France) Alexandre Prémat | All |
| (United Kingdom) DPR | 11 | (France) Olivier Pla | All |
| (United Kingdom) DPR | 12 | (United Kingdom) Ryan Sharp | 1–7 |
| (United Kingdom) DPR | 12 | (Italy) Giorgio Mondini (Note: Mondini is a Swiss driver who competed under an Italian racing licence.) | 8–12 |
| (France) DAMS | 14 | (France) José María López (Note: López is an Argentine driver who competed under a French racing licence. López competed under an Argentine racing license at the Catalunya round.) | All |
| (France) DAMS | 15 | (United Kingdom) Fairuz Fauzy (Note: Fauzy is a Malaysian driver who competed under a British racing licence.) | All |
| (Italy) Coloni Motorsport | 16 | (Austria) Mathias Lauda | All |
| (Italy) Coloni Motorsport | 17 | (Italy) Gianmaria Bruni | 1–9 |
| (Italy) Coloni Motorsport | 17 | (Finland) Toni Vilander | 10–11 |
| (Italy) Coloni Motorsport | 17 | (Italy) Ferdinando Monfardini | 12 |
| (Spain) Racing Engineering | 18 | (Switzerland) Neel Jani | All |
| (Spain) Racing Engineering | 19 | (Spain) Borja García | All |
| (Spain) Campos Racing | 20 | (Spain) Juan Cruz Álvarez (Note: Álvarez is an Argentine driver who competed under a Spanish racing licence.) | All |
| (Spain) Campos Racing | 21 | (Spain) Sergio Hernández | All |
| (Netherlands) Arden International (Note: Arden International competed under a Dutch licence.) | 22 | (Finland) Heikki Kovalainen | All |
| (Netherlands) Arden International | 23 | (France) Nicolas Lapierre | All |
| (Italy) Durango | 24 | (Monaco) Clivio Piccione | All |
| (Italy) Durango | 25 | (Italy) Ferdinando Monfardini | 1–10 |
| (Italy) Durango | 25 | (Italy) Gianmaria Bruni | 11–12 |

=== Driver changes ===
Entering GP2

- Juan Cruz Álvarez: World Series by Nissan (Gabord Competición) → Campos Racing
- Can Artam: International Formula 3000 (Coloni Motorsport & Super Nova Racing) → iSport International
- Gianmaria Bruni: Formula One (Minardi Cosworth) → Coloni Motorsport
- Adam Carroll: British Formula 3 Championship (P1 Racing) → Super Nova International
- Fairuz Fauzy: British Formula 3 Championship (Menu F3 Motorsport & P1 Racing) → DAMS
- Borja García: Spanish Formula Three Championship (Racing Engineering) → Racing Engineering
- Sergio Hernández: Spanish Formula Three Championship (Adrian Campos Motorsport) & World Series by Nissan (Saulnier Racing) → Campos Racing
- Neel Jani: Formula Renault V6 Eurocup (DAMS) → Racing Engineering
- Heikki Kovalainen: World Series by Nissan (Pons Racing) → Arden International
- Mathias Lauda: International Formula 3000 (CMS Performance) & Superfund Euro Formula 3000 (Traini Corse) → Coloni Motorsport
- Nicolas Lapierre: Formula Three Euroseries (Signature) → Arden International
- José María López: International Formula 3000 (CMS Performance) & Formula Renault V6 Eurocup (DAMS) → DAMS
- Ferdinando Monfardini: International Formula 3000 (Spero I.E.) → Durango
- Alexandre Sarnes Negrão: Formula Three Sudamericana (Piquet Sports) → Hitech Piquet Sports
- Giorgio Pantano: Formula One (Jordan Ford) → Super Nova International
- Clivio Piccione: British Formula 3 Championship (Carlin Motorsport) → Durango
- Nelson Piquet Jr.: British Formula 3 Championship (Piquet Sports) → Hitech Piquet Sports
- Olivier Pla: World Series by Nissan (RC Motorsport & Carlin Motorsport) → DPR
- Alexandre Prémat: Formula Three Euroseries (ASM Formule 3) → ART Grand Prix
- Nico Rosberg: Formula Three Euroseries (Team Rosberg) → ART Grand Prix
- Ryan Sharp: Formula Renault V6 Eurocup (Jenzer Motorsport) → DPR
- Scott Speed: Eurocup Formula Renault 2.0 & Formula Renault 2.0 Germany (Motopark Academy) → iSport International
- Toni Vilander: Italian Formula Three Championship (Coloni F3) & Formula Three Euroseries (Coloni F3) → Coloni Motorsport
- Ernesto Viso: [British Formula 3 Championship (P1 Racing) & International Formula 3000 (Durango) → BCN Competición
- Hiroki Yoshimoto: World Series by Nissan (Gabord Competición) → BCN Competición

==== Midseason changes ====
- Giorgio Mondini replaced Ryan Sharp for Hungarian races
- Toni Vilander replaced Gianmaria Bruni for Italian races.
- Gianmaria Bruni replaced Ferdinando Monfardini for Belgian races.
- Ferdinando Monfardini replaced Toni Vilander for Bahrain races.

== Calendar ==
There were 23 races in the 2005 GP2 Series championship at 12 different circuits. Eleven race weekends had one race on Saturday and another on Sunday, the exception being the race at Circuit de Monaco where there was only one race on the weekend. The season began on 23 April 2005 and concluded on 25 September 2005.

The calendar was as follows:

| Round | | Location | Circuit | Date | Supporting |
|---|---|---|---|---|---|
| 1 | F | Imola, Italy | Autodromo Enzo e Dino Ferrari | 23 April | San Marino Grand Prix |
| 1 | S | Imola, Italy | Autodromo Enzo e Dino Ferrari | 24 April | San Marino Grand Prix |
| 2 | F | Montmeló, Spain | Circuit de Catalunya | 7 May | Spanish Grand Prix |
| 2 | S | Montmeló, Spain | Circuit de Catalunya | 8 May | Spanish Grand Prix |
| 3 | F | Monaco | Circuit de Monaco | 21 May | Monaco Grand Prix |
| 4 | F | Nürburg, Germany | Nürburgring | 28 May | European Grand Prix |
| 4 | S | Nürburg, Germany | Nürburgring | 29 May | European Grand Prix |
| 5 | F | Magny-Cours, France | Circuit de Nevers Magny-Cours | 2 July | French Grand Prix |
| 5 | S | Magny-Cours, France | Circuit de Nevers Magny-Cours | 3 July | French Grand Prix |
| 6 | F | (United Kingdom) Silverstone, UK | Silverstone Circuit | 9 July | British Grand Prix |
| 6 | S | (United Kingdom) Silverstone, UK | Silverstone Circuit | 10 July | British Grand Prix |
| 7 | F | Hockenheim, Germany | Hockenheimring | 23 July | German Grand Prix |
| 7 | S | Hockenheim, Germany | Hockenheimring | 24 July | German Grand Prix |
| 8 | F | Mogyoród, Hungary | Hungaroring | 30 July | Hungarian Grand Prix |
| 8 | S | Mogyoród, Hungary | Hungaroring | 31 July | Hungarian Grand Prix |
| 9 | F | Istanbul, Turkey | Istanbul Racing Circuit | 20 August | Turkish Grand Prix |
| 9 | S | Istanbul, Turkey | Istanbul Racing Circuit | 21 August | Turkish Grand Prix |
| 10 | F | Monza, Italy | Autodromo Nazionale Monza | 3 September | Italian Grand Prix |
| 10 | S | Monza, Italy | Autodromo Nazionale Monza | 4 September | Italian Grand Prix |
| 11 | F | Stavelot, Belgium | Circuit de Spa-Francorchamps | 10 September | Belgian Grand Prix |
| 11 | S | Stavelot, Belgium | Circuit de Spa-Francorchamps | 11 September | Belgian Grand Prix |
| 12 | F | Sakhir, Bahrain | Bahrain International Circuit | 29 September | Stand-alone event |
| 12 | S | Sakhir, Bahrain | Bahrain International Circuit | 30 September | Stand-alone event |

== Results ==
| Round | | Circuit | Pole position | Fastest lap | Winning driver | Winning team | Report |
|---|---|---|---|---|---|---|---|
| 1 | F | (Italy) Autodromo Enzo e Dino Ferrari | (France) Nicolas Lapierre | (Venezuela) Ernesto Viso | (Finland) Heikki Kovalainen | (Netherlands) Arden International | Report |
| 1 | S | (Italy) Autodromo Enzo e Dino Ferrari | | (France) Nicolas Lapierre | (United Kingdom) Adam Carroll | (United Kingdom) Super Nova International | Report |
| 2 | F | (Spain) Circuit de Catalunya | (United States) Scott Speed | (Germany) Nico Rosberg | (Italy) Gianmaria Bruni | (Italy) Coloni Motorsport | Report |
| 2 | S | (Spain) Circuit de Catalunya | | (United Kingdom) Ryan Sharp | (Argentina) José María López | (France) DAMS | Report |
| 3 | F | Circuit de Monaco | (Finland) Heikki Kovalainen | (Finland) Heikki Kovalainen | (United Kingdom) Adam Carroll | (United Kingdom) Super Nova International | Report |
| 4 | F | (Germany) Nürburgring | (Italy) Giorgio Pantano | (United States) Scott Speed | (Finland) Heikki Kovalainen | (Netherlands) Arden International | Report |
| 4 | S | (Germany) Nürburgring | | (United States) Scott Speed | (Monaco) Clivio Piccione | (Italy) Durango | Report |
| 5 | F | (France) Circuit de Nevers Magny-Cours | (France) Alexandre Prémat | (Italy) Gianmaria Bruni | (Finland) Heikki Kovalainen | (Netherlands) Arden International | Report |
| 5 | S | (France) Circuit de Nevers Magny-Cours | | (Brazil) Nelson Piquet Jr. (Note: Nelson Piquet Jr. set the fastest lap, but was disqualified after the competition as his team had broken the regulations and changed all four of his tyres twice during the race. The points were given to Gianmaria Bruni instead.) | (Germany) Nico Rosberg | (France) ART Grand Prix | Report |
| 6 | F | (United Kingdom) Silverstone Circuit | (Germany) Nico Rosberg | (France) Alexandre Prémat | (Germany) Nico Rosberg | (France) ART Grand Prix | Report |
| 6 | S | (United Kingdom) Silverstone Circuit | | (United States) Scott Speed | (France) Olivier Pla | (United Kingdom) DPR | Report |
| 7 | F | (Germany) Hockenheimring | (Germany) Nico Rosberg | (Germany) Nico Rosberg | (Germany) Nico Rosberg | (France) ART Grand Prix | Report |
| 7 | S | (Germany) Hockenheimring | | (Germany) Nico Rosberg | (France) Olivier Pla | (United Kingdom) DPR | Report |
| 8 | F | (Hungary) Hungaroring | (Switzerland) Neel Jani (Note: Nico Rosberg recorded the fastest time in qualifying, but was disqualified when the front suspension and steering of her car were found to be illegal. Neel Jani was recognised as the pole-sitter for the race.) | (Japan) Hiroki Yoshimoto | (Switzerland) Neel Jani | (Spain) Racing Engineering | Report |
| 8 | S | (Hungary) Hungaroring | | (Monaco) Clivio Piccione | (France) Alexandre Prémat | (France) ART Grand Prix | Report |
| 9 | F | (Turkey) Istanbul Racing Circuit | (Germany) Nico Rosberg | (United States) Scott Speed | (France) Alexandre Prémat | (France) ART Grand Prix | Report |
| 9 | S | (Turkey) Istanbul Racing Circuit | | (France) Olivier Pla | (Finland) Heikki Kovalainen | (Netherlands) Arden International | Report |
| 10 | F | (Italy) Autodromo Nazionale Monza | (Finland) Heikki Kovalainen | (Germany) Nico Rosberg | (Finland) Heikki Kovalainen | (Netherlands) Arden International | Report |
| 10 | S | (Italy) Autodromo Nazionale Monza | | (Germany) Nico Rosberg | (Switzerland) Neel Jani | (Spain) Racing Engineering | Report |
| 11 | F | (Belgium) Circuit de Spa-Francorchamps | (Italy) Gianmaria Bruni | (France) Alexandre Prémat (Note: Alexandre Prémat set the fastest lap, but did not finish the race so the points were given to Adam Carroll.) | (Brazil) Nelson Piquet Jr. | (United Kingdom) Hitech Piquet Sports | Report |
| 11 | S | (Belgium) Circuit de Spa-Francorchamps | | (United Kingdom) Adam Carroll | (United Kingdom) Adam Carroll | (United Kingdom) Super Nova International | Report |
| 12 | F | Bahrain International Circuit | (Germany) Nico Rosberg | (France) Alexandre Prémat | (Germany) Nico Rosberg | (France) ART Grand Prix | Report |
| 12 | S | Bahrain International Circuit | | (United States) Scott Speed | (Germany) Nico Rosberg | (France) ART Grand Prix | Report |

== Championship standings ==
Scoring system

Points are awarded to the top 8 classified finishers in the Feature race, and to the top 6 classified finishers in the Sprint race. The pole-sitter in the feature race will also receive two points, and two points are given to the driver who set the fastest lap in the feature and sprint races. The driver also has to drive 90% of race laps. No extra points are awarded to the pole-sitter in the sprint race.

Feature race points

| Position | **1st** | **2nd** | **3rd** | **4th** | **5th** | **6th** | **7th** | **8th** | **Pole** | **FL** |
| Points | 10 | 8 | 6 | 5 | 4 | 3 | 2 | 1 | 2 | 2 |

Sprint race points

Points are awarded to the top 6 classified finishers.

| Position | **1st** | **2nd** | **3rd** | **4th** | **5th** | **6th** | **FL** |
| Points | 6 | 5 | 4 | 3 | 2 | 1 | 2 |

=== Drivers' Championship ===
| Pos | Driver | IMO (Italy) | | CAT (Spain) | | MON (Monaco) | NÜR (Germany) | | MAG (France) | | SIL (United Kingdom) | | HOC (Germany) | | HUN (Hungary) | | IST (Turkey) | | MNZ (Italy) | | SPA^{‡} (Belgium) | | BHR (Bahrain) | | Points |
|---|---|---|---|---|---|---|---|---|---|---|---|---|---|---|---|---|---|---|---|---|---|---|---|---|---|
| 1 | (Germany) Nico Rosberg | 8 | Ret | 9 | 4 | 3 | 3 | 4 | 7 | 1 | **1** | 4 | **1** | 4 | 5 | 2 | **17** | 3 | 2 | 2 | 3 | 5 | **1** | 1 | 120 |
| 2 | (Finland) Heikki Kovalainen | 1 | 3 | 3 | Ret | **5** | 1 | Ret | 1 | 3 | 2 | 3 | 5 | 6 | 2 | 5 | 10 | 1 | **1** | 5 | 15† | 9 | 3 | Ret | 105 |
| 3 | (United States) Scott Speed | 3 | Ret | **2** | 3 | 4 | 16 | 12 | 15 | 18 | 4 | 2 | 4 | 3 | Ret | 19 | 5 | 4 | Ret | 15 | 4 | 4 | Ret | 19 | 67.5 |
| 4 | (France) Alexandre Prémat | 7 | 2 | 10 | Ret | Ret | 4 | Ret | **9** | Ret | 3 | 5 | 2 | 9 | 4 | 1 | 1 | 14 | Ret | 18 | Ret | 12 | 2 | 3 | 67 |
| 5 | (United Kingdom) Adam Carroll | 5 | 1 | 7 | 6 | 1 | Ret | 2 | 4 | 6 | 21† | 8 | Ret | 11 | 9 | 9 | 7 | 2 | 5 | 6 | 8 | 1 | 9 | 8 | 53 |
| 6 | (Italy) Giorgio Pantano | 13† | Ret | 13 | 14 | Ret | **2** | 7 | 10 | 7 | 12 | 7 | 6 | 2 | 3 | 3 | 2 | 8 | 6 | 3 | NC | 11 | 5 | 5 | 49 |
| 7 | (Switzerland) Neel Jani | 6 | 15 | 4 | 5 | Ret | 6 | 13† | 5 | 4 | 5 | 6 | Ret | 22 | **1** | 4 | Ret | Ret | 7 | 1 | 16 | 18 | 16 | 13 | 48 |
| 8 | (Brazil) Nelson Piquet Jr. | 14† | 6 | 5 | 2 | 11† | 5 | 3 | Ret | DSQ | DNS | Ret | 3 | 8 | 15† | 10 | 4 | 6 | 3 | Ret | 1 | 14 | Ret | 15 | 46 |
| 9 | (Argentina) José María López | 2 | 11 | 6 | 1 | Ret | 13 | 14 | 2 | Ret | 9 | DNS | 13 | 10 | Ret | Ret | 6 | 7 | Ret | Ret | 10 | 8 | 4 | 4 | 36 |
| 10 | (Italy) Gianmaria Bruni | 4 | 4 | 1 | Ret | 2 | 8 | Ret | 18 | 11 | 7 | 11 | NC | 14 | 10 | 8 | Ret | 9 | | | **Ret** | 16 | Ret | 14 | 35 |
| 11 | (Venezuela) Ernesto Viso | 10 | DNS | Ret | Ret | DSQ | Ret | 11 | 11 | 8 | 15 | 13 | DSQ | 12 | 6 | Ret | 14 | 12 | Ret | Ret | 2 | 3 | 8 | 2 | 21 |
| 12 | (France) Nicolas Lapierre | **DNS** | Ret | 11 | 9 | Ret | 12 | Ret | 3 | 5 | 10 | Ret | 9 | 7 | 12 | 6 | Ret | 13 | 4 | Ret | Ret | 23† | 6 | 20 | 21 |
| 13 | (France) Olivier Pla | 9 | 5 | Ret | Ret | 9 | Ret | 8 | Ret | 9 | 8 | 1 | 8 | 1 | 7 | Ret | 9 | 17 | Ret | Ret | 11 | 10 | Ret | DNS | 20 |
| 14 | (Spain) Borja García | Ret | 10 | Ret | 10 | 10† | Ret | EX | Ret | 12 | 17 | 9 | 7 | 5 | 11 | Ret | 3 | 5 | Ret | 10 | 6 | 2 | 19† | 17 | 17.5 |
| 15 | (Monaco) Clivio Piccione | 15 | Ret | Ret | 8 | Ret | 7 | 1 | 8 | DSQ | 6 | Ret | Ret | 17 | Ret | 16 | Ret | 11 | 11 | 14 | 12 | 19 | 13 | 7 | 14 |
| 16 | (Japan) Hiroki Yoshimoto | Ret | 9 | Ret | 17 | DNS | 11 | DNS | 6 | 2 | 13 | DNS | 12 | Ret | 13 | 17 | 8 | 10 | 10 | 16 | Ret | 17 | 7 | 6 | 14 |
| 17 | (Italy) Ferdinando Monfardini | Ret | DNS | Ret | 11 | DNS | Ret | 6 | 12 | 17† | 14 | 10 | Ret | 15 | Ret | 11 | Ret | Ret | 8 | 4 | | | Ret | 11 | 5 |
| 18 | (Spain) Juan Cruz Álvarez | Ret | 7 | Ret | 12 | Ret | 18† | 15 | Ret | DSQ | 11 | Ret | 10 | NC | Ret | 7 | 15 | Ret | 12 | 17† | 5 | 6 | 10 | 12 | 4.5 |
| 19 | (Brazil) Alexandre Negrão | Ret | 13 | 8 | 15 | 12† | Ret | Ret | Ret | 13 | 19 | 16† | Ret | 18 | 8 | 15 | 12 | 19 | Ret | 13 | 7 | 7 | 12 | 9 | 4 |
| 20 | (Spain) Sergio Hernández | 11 | 8 | Ret | 18† | 8 | 15 | 5 | 13 | 14 | 16 | 12 | Ret | 19 | Ret | 18† | Ret | 20† | Ret | 7 | Ret | 20† | 15 | 18 | 3 |
| 21 | (Austria) Mathias Lauda | 12 | Ret | Ret | 13 | 6 | 10 | Ret | 16 | 15 | 20 | 15 | 14 | 21 | Ret | 14 | 16 | 18 | 13 | 12 | 9 | 24† | 14 | 21 | 3 |
| 22 | (Turkey) Can Artam | 16† | Ret | Ret | Ret | 7 | 17 | Ret | 17 | 16 | 18 | 14 | Ret | 20 | 14 | 12 | 11 | 16 | 9 | 9 | Ret | 22† | 17 | 16 | 2 |
| 23 | (United Kingdom) Ryan Sharp | Ret | 14 | Ret | 16 | Ret | 9 | 9 | 19 | Ret | Ret | NC | 11 | 13 | | | | | | | | | | | 2 |
| 24 | (United Kingdom) Fairuz Fauzy | 17† | 12 | 12 | 7 | Ret | 14 | 10 | 14 | 10 | Ret | DNS | Ret | 16 | Ret | 13 | Ret | 15 | 14 | 11 | 13 | 15 | 11 | 10 | 0 |
| 25 | (Finland) Toni Vilander | | | | | | | | | | | | | | | | | | 15 | 8 | 14 | 13 | | | 0 |
| 26 | (Italy) Giorgio Mondini | | | | | | | | | | | | | | Ret | Ret | 13 | Ret | Ret | Ret | Ret | 21† | 18 | 22 | 0 |
| Pos | Driver | IMO (Italy) | | CAT (Spain) | | MON (Monaco) | NÜR (Germany) | | MAG (France) | | SIL (United Kingdom) | | HOC (Germany) | | HUN (Hungary) | | IST (Turkey) | | MNZ (Italy) | | SPA (Belgium) | | BHR (Bahrain) | | Points |

Key
| Colour | Result |
|---|---|
| Gold | Winner |
| Silver | 2nd place |
| Bronze | 3rd place |
| Green | Other points position |
| Blue | Other classified position |
| Blue | Not classified, finished (NC) |
| Purple | Not classified, retired (Ret) |
| Red | Did not qualify (DNQ) |
| Red | Did not pre-qualify (DNPQ) |
| Black | Disqualified (DSQ) |
| White | Did not start (DNS) |
| White | Race cancelled (C) |
| Blank | Did not practice (DNP) |
| Blank | Excluded (EX) |
| Blank | Did not arrive (DNA) |
| Blank | Withdrawn (WD) |
| Text formatting | Meaning |
| **Bold** | Pole position point(s) |
| Italics | Fastest lap point(s) |

Notes:

- † – Drivers did not finish the race, but were classified as they completed more than 90% of the race distance.
- ‡ – Sprint race at Spa was stopped early and half points were awarded.

=== Teams' Championship ===
| Pos | Team | Car No. | IMO (Italy) | | CAT (Spain) | | MON (Monaco) | NÜR (Germany) | | MAG (France) | | SIL (United Kingdom) | | HOC (Germany) | | HUN (Hungary) | | IST (Turkey) | | MNZ (Italy) | | SPA^{‡} (Belgium) | | BHR (Bahrain) | | Points |
|---|---|---|---|---|---|---|---|---|---|---|---|---|---|---|---|---|---|---|---|---|---|---|---|---|---|---|
| 1 | (France) ART Grand Prix | 9 | 8 | Ret | 9 | 4 | 3 | 3 | 4 | 7 | 1 | **1** | 4 | **1** | 4 | 5 | 2 | **17** | 3 | 2 | 2 | 3 | 5 | **1** | 1 | 187 |
| 1 | (France) ART Grand Prix | 10 | 7 | 2 | 10 | Ret | Ret | 4 | Ret | **9** | Ret | 3 | 5 | 2 | 9 | 4 | 1 | 1 | 14 | Ret | 18 | Ret | 12 | 2 | 3 | 187 |
| 2 | (Netherlands) Arden International | 22 | 1 | 3 | 3 | Ret | **5** | 1 | Ret | 1 | 3 | 2 | 3 | 5 | 6 | 2 | 5 | 10 | 1 | **1** | 5 | 15† | 9 | 3 | Ret | 126 |
| 2 | (Netherlands) Arden International | 23 | **DNS** | Ret | 11 | 9 | Ret | 12 | Ret | 3 | 5 | 10 | Ret | 9 | 7 | 12 | 6 | Ret | 13 | 4 | Ret | Ret | 23† | 6 | 20 | 126 |
| 3 | (United Kingdom) Super Nova International | 7 | 13† | Ret | 13 | 14 | Ret | **2** | 7 | 10 | 7 | 12 | 7 | 6 | 2 | 3 | 3 | 2 | 8 | 6 | 3 | NC | 11 | 5 | 5 | 102 |
| 3 | (United Kingdom) Super Nova International | 8 | 5 | 1 | 7 | 6 | 1 | Ret | 2 | 4 | 6 | 21† | 8 | Ret | 11 | 9 | 9 | 7 | 2 | 5 | 6 | 8 | 1 | 9 | 8 | 102 |
| 4 | (United Kingdom) iSport International | 1 | 3 | Ret | **2** | 3 | 4 | 16 | 12 | 15 | 18 | 4 | 2 | 4 | 3 | Ret | 19 | 5 | 4 | Ret | 15 | 4 | 4 | Ret | 19 | 69.5 |
| 4 | (United Kingdom) iSport International | 2 | 16† | Ret | Ret | Ret | 7 | 17 | Ret | 17 | 16 | 18 | 14 | Ret | 20 | 14 | 12 | 11 | 16 | 9 | 9 | Ret | 22† | 17 | 16 | 69.5 |
| 5 | (Spain) Racing Engineering | 18 | 6 | 15 | 4 | 5 | Ret | 6 | 13† | 5 | 4 | 5 | 6 | Ret | 22 | **1** | 4 | Ret | Ret | 7 | 1 | 16 | 18 | 16 | 13 | 65.5 |
| 5 | (Spain) Racing Engineering | 19 | Ret | 10 | Ret | 10 | 10† | Ret | EX | Ret | 12 | 17 | 9 | 7 | 5 | 11 | Ret | 3 | 5 | Ret | 10 | 6 | 2 | 19† | 17 | 65.5 |
| 6 | (United Kingdom) Hitech Piquet Sports | 3 | 14† | 6 | 5 | 2 | 11† | 5 | 3 | Ret | DSQ | DNS | Ret | 3 | 8 | 15† | 10 | 4 | 6 | 3 | Ret | 1 | 14 | Ret | 15 | 50 |
| 6 | (United Kingdom) Hitech Piquet Sports | 4 | Ret | 13 | 8 | 15 | 12† | Ret | Ret | Ret | 13 | 19 | 16† | Ret | 18 | 8 | 15 | 12 | 19 | Ret | 13 | 7 | 7 | 12 | 9 | 50 |
| 7 | (France) DAMS | 14 | 2 | 11 | 6 | 1 | Ret | 13 | 14 | 2 | Ret | 9 | DNS | 13 | 10 | Ret | Ret | 6 | 7 | Ret | Ret | 10 | 8 | 4 | 4 | 36 |
| 7 | (France) DAMS | 15 | 17† | 12 | 12 | 7 | Ret | 14 | 10 | 14 | 10 | Ret | DNS | Ret | 16 | Ret | 13 | Ret | 15 | 14 | 11 | 13 | 15 | 11 | 10 | 36 |
| 8 | (Italy) Coloni Motorsport | 16 | 12 | Ret | Ret | 13 | 6 | 10 | Ret | 16 | 15 | 20 | 15 | 14 | 21 | Ret | 14 | 16 | 18 | 13 | 12 | 9 | 24† | 14 | 21 | 36 |
| 8 | (Italy) Coloni Motorsport | 17 | 4 | 4 | 1 | Ret | 2 | 8 | Ret | 18 | 11 | 7 | 11 | NC | 14 | 10 | 8 | Ret | 9 | 15 | 8 | 14 | 13 | Ret | 11 | 36 |
| 9 | (Spain) BCN Competición | 5 | 10 | DNS | Ret | Ret | DSQ | Ret | 11 | 11 | 8 | 15 | 13 | DSQ | 12 | 6 | Ret | 14 | 12 | Ret | Ret | 2 | 3 | 8 | 2 | 35 |
| 9 | (Spain) BCN Competición | 6 | Ret | 9 | Ret | 17 | DNS | 11 | DNS | 6 | 2 | 13 | DNS | 12 | Ret | 13 | 17 | 8 | 10 | 10 | 16 | Ret | 17 | 7 | 6 | 35 |
| 10 | (United Kingdom) DPR | 11 | 9 | 5 | Ret | Ret | 9 | Ret | 8 | Ret | 9 | 8 | 1 | 8 | 1 | 7 | Ret | 9 | 17 | Ret | Ret | 11 | 10 | Ret | DNS | 22 |
| 10 | (United Kingdom) DPR | 12 | Ret | 14 | Ret | 16 | Ret | 9 | 9 | 19 | Ret | Ret | NC | 11 | 13 | Ret | Ret | 13 | Ret | Ret | Ret | Ret | 21† | 18 | 22 | 22 |
| 11 | (Italy) Durango | 24 | 15 | Ret | Ret | 8 | Ret | 7 | 1 | 8 | DSQ | 6 | Ret | Ret | 17 | Ret | 16 | Ret | 11 | 11 | 14 | 12 | 19 | 13 | 7 | 21 |
| 11 | (Italy) Durango | 25 | Ret | DNS | Ret | 11 | DNS | Ret | 6 | 12 | 17† | 14 | 10 | Ret | 15 | Ret | 11 | Ret | Ret | 8 | 4 | **Ret** | 16 | Ret | 14 | 21 |
| 12 | (Spain) Campos Racing | 20 | Ret | 7 | Ret | 12 | Ret | 18† | 15 | Ret | DSQ | 11 | Ret | 10 | NC | Ret | 7 | 15 | Ret | 12 | 17† | 5 | 6 | 10 | 12 | 7.5 |
| 12 | (Spain) Campos Racing | 21 | 11 | 8 | Ret | 18† | 8 | 15 | 5 | 13 | 14 | 16 | 12 | Ret | 19 | Ret | 18† | Ret | 20† | Ret | 7 | Ret | 20† | 15 | 18 | 7.5 |
| Pos | Team | Car No. | IMO (Italy) | | CAT (Spain) | | MON (Monaco) | NÜR (Germany) | | MAG (France) | | SIL (United Kingdom) | | HOC (Germany) | | HUN (Hungary) | | IST (Turkey) | | MNZ (Italy) | | SPA (Belgium) | | BHR (Bahrain) | | Points |
