= 2005 Hockenheimring GP2 Series round =

(Germany) 2005 Hockenheimring GP2 round
Round details
- Round 7 of 12 rounds in the 2005 GP2 Series
- Hockenheimring
- Location: Hockenheimring, Hockenheim, Germany
- Course: Permanent racing facility 4.574 km (2.842 mi)

GP2 Series

Feature race
- Date: 23 July 2005
- Laps: 40

Pole position
Driver	(Germany) Nico Rosberg	ART Grand Prix
- Time: 1:24.691

Podium
First	(Germany) Nico Rosberg	ART Grand Prix
Second	(France) Alexandre Prémat	ART Grand Prix
Third	(Brazil) Nelson Piquet Jr.	Hitech Piquet Sports

Fastest lap
Driver	(Germany) Nico Rosberg	ART Grand Prix
- Time: 1:27.672 (on lap 3)

Sprint race
- Date: 24 July 2005
- Laps: 27

Podium
First	(France) Olivier Pla	DPR
Second	(Italy) Giorgio Pantano	Super Nova International
Third	(United States) Scott Speed	iSport International

Fastest lap
Driver	(Germany) Nico Rosberg	ART Grand Prix
- Time: 1:27.245 (on lap 24)

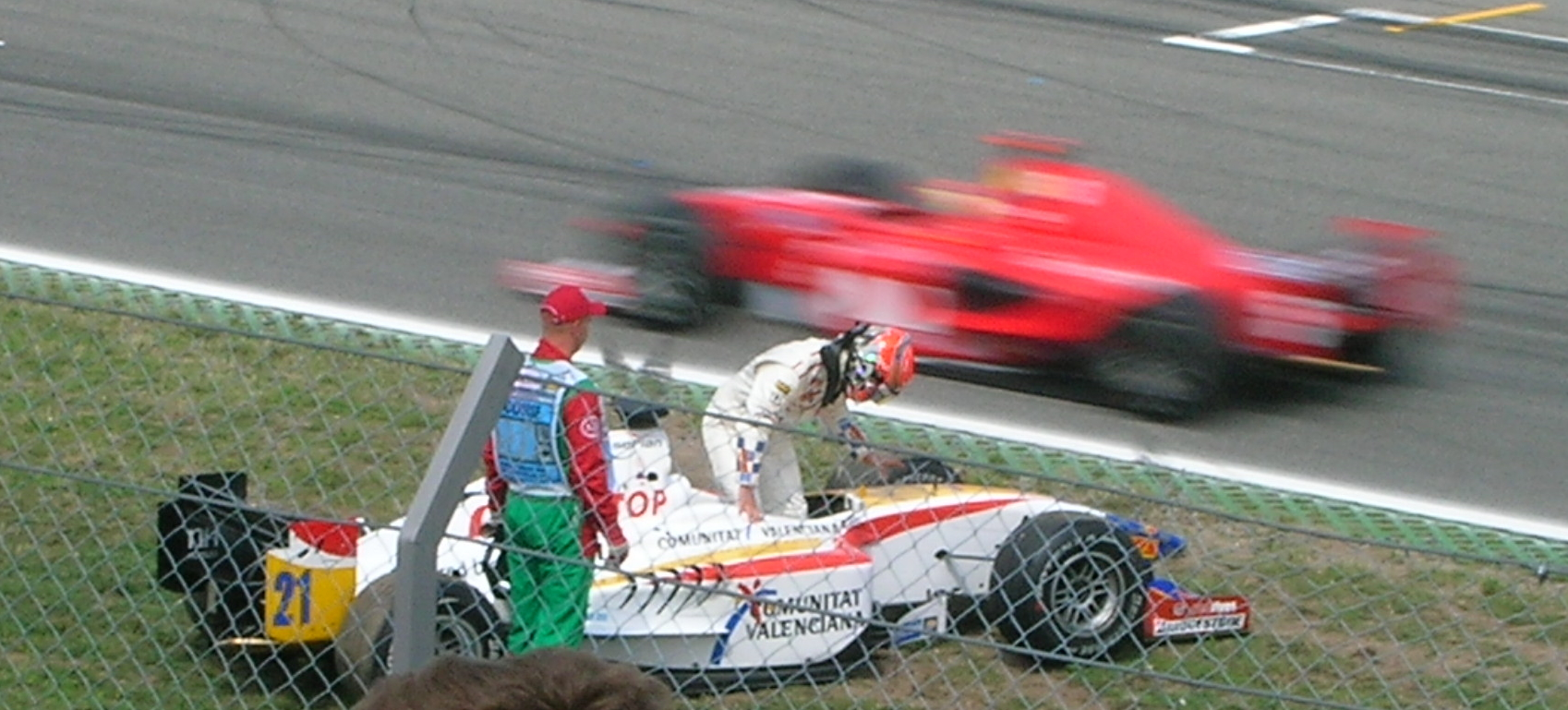
Sergio Hernández retires from the feature race

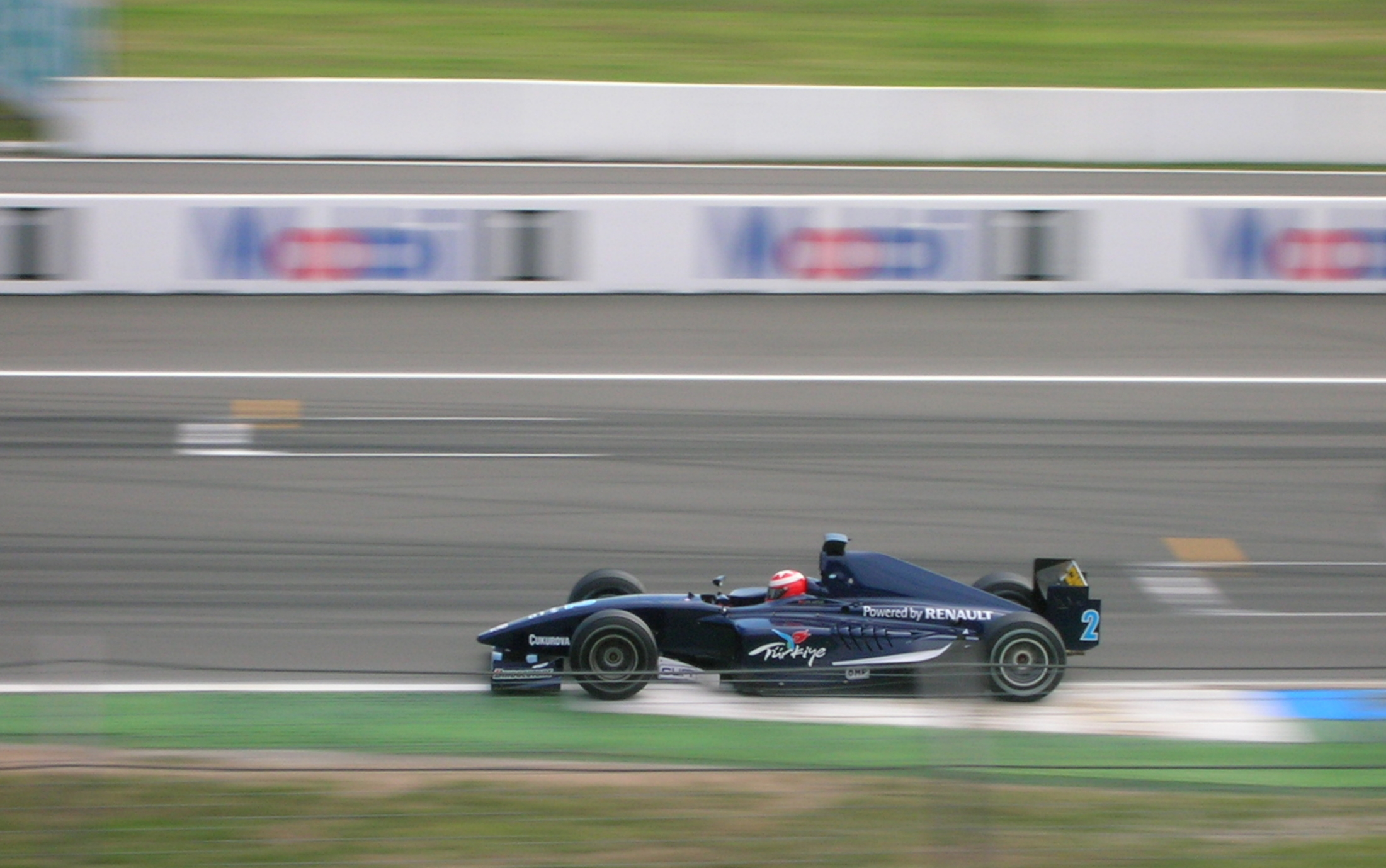
Can Artam during the sprint race

The 2005 Hockenheimring GP2 Series round was a GP2 Series motor race held on 23 and 24 July 2005 at the Hockenheimring in Baden-Württemberg, Germany. It was the seventh round of the 2005 GP2 Series season. The race weekend supported the 2005 German Grand Prix.

Nico Rosberg, who was the polesitter for the second consecutive feature race, won in the first race, his third victory in four races. The feature race podium was completed by Rosberg's fellow ART Grand Prix driver Alexandre Prémat, and Nelson Piquet Jr., of Hitech Piquet Sports.

Frenchman Olivier Pla, who was on reverse grid pole for the second consecutive round after again finishing eighth in the feature race, took the win in the sprint race, ahead of Super Nova's Giorgio Pantano and iSport's Scott Speed.

Rosberg scored nineteen points at Hockenheim, while Heikki Kovalainen could only manage five, allowing the German to reduce Kovalainen's Drivers' Championship lead to just six points, with five rounds remaining. Rosberg's ART team moved into the lead of the Teams' Championship standings, in the process overtaking Kovalainen's Arden team.

== Classification ==
=== Qualifying ===
Pos.	No.	Driver	Team	Time	Gap	Grid
1	9	(Germany) Nico Rosberg	ART Grand Prix	1:24.691		1
2	1	(United States) Scott Speed	iSport International	1:25.195	+0.504	2
3	10	(France) Alexandre Prémat	ART Grand Prix	1:25.623	+0.932	3
4	11	(France) Olivier Pla	DPR	1:25.832	+1.141	4
5	19	(Spain) Borja García	Racing Engineering	1:25.845	+1.154	5
6	5	(Venezuela) Ernesto Viso	BCN Competición	1:25.861	+1.170	6
7	8	(United Kingdom) Adam Carroll	Super Nova International	1:25.955	+1.264	7
8	3	(Brazil) Nelson Piquet Jr.	Hitech Piquet Sports	1:26.006	+1.315	8
9	22	(Finland) Heikki Kovalainen	Arden International	1:26.041	+1.350	9
10	24	(Monaco) Clivio Piccione	Durango	1:26.126	+1.435	10
11	7	(Italy) Giorgio Pantano	Super Nova International	1:26.249	+1.558	11
12	6	(Japan) Hiroki Yoshimoto	BCN Competición	1:26.279	+1.588	12
13	17	(Italy) Gianmaria Bruni	Coloni Motorsport	1:26.325	+1.634	13
14	18	(Switzerland) Neel Jani	Racing Engineering	1:26.368	+1.677	14
15	23	(France) Nicolas Lapierre	Arden International	1:26.403	+1.712	15
16	12	(United Kingdom) Ryan Sharp	DPR	1:26.561	+1.870	16
17	25	(Italy) Ferdinando Monfardini	Durango	1:26.610	+1.919	17
18	4	(Brazil) Alexandre Negrão	Hitech Piquet Sports	1:26.627	+1.936	18
19	20	(Spain) Juan Cruz Álvarez	Campos Racing	1:26.680	+1.989	19
20	14	(France) José María López	DAMS	1:26.693	+2.002	20
21	15	(United Kingdom) Fairuz Fauzy	DAMS	1:26.982	+2.291	21
22	16	(Austria) Mathias Lauda	Coloni Motorsport	1:27.157	+2.466	22
23	21	(Spain) Sergio Hernández	Campos Racing	1:27.245	+2.554	23
24	2	(Turkey) Can Artam	iSport International	1:27.319	+2.628	24
107% time: 1:30.619

=== Feature race ===
Pos.	No.	Driver	Team	Laps	Time/Retired	Grid	Points
1	9	(Germany) Nico Rosberg	ART Grand Prix	40	59:30.442	1	14
2	10	(France) Alexandre Prémat	ART Grand Prix	40	+14.600	3	8
3	3	(Brazil) Nelson Piquet Jr.	Hitech Piquet Sports	40	+15.300	8	6
4	1	(United States) Scott Speed	iSport International	40	+15.800	2	5
5	22	(Finland) Heikki Kovalainen	Arden International	40	+24.600	9	4
6	7	(Italy) Giorgio Pantano	Super Nova International	40	+34.500	11	3
7	19	(Spain) Borja García	Racing Engineering	40	+41.300	5	2
8	11	(France) Olivier Pla	DPR	40	+41.700	4	1
9	23	(France) Nicolas Lapierre	Arden International	40	+48.000	15	
10	20	(Spain) Juan Cruz Álvarez	Campos Racing	40	+48.300	19	
11	12	(United Kingdom) Ryan Sharp	DPR	40	+53.000	16	
12	6	(Japan) Hiroki Yoshimoto	BCN Competición	40	+1:09.000	12	
13	14	(France) José María López	DAMS	39	+1 lap	20	
14	16	(Austria) Mathias Lauda	Coloni Motorsport	39	+1 lap	22	
Ret	17	(Italy) Gianmaria Bruni	Coloni Motorsport	20	Did not finish	13	
Ret	2	(Turkey) Can Artam	iSport International	17	Did not finish	24	
Ret	24	(Monaco) Clivio Piccione	Durango	15	Did not finish	10	
Ret	18	(Switzerland) Neel Jani	Racing Engineering	10	Did not finish	14	
Ret	8	(United Kingdom) Adam Carroll	Super Nova International	7	Did not finish	7	
Ret	15	(United Kingdom) Fairuz Fauzy	DAMS	6	Did not finish	21	
Ret	21	(Spain) Sergio Hernández	Campos Racing	4	Spun off	23	
Ret	25	(Italy) Ferdinando Monfardini	Durango	1	Did not finish	17	
Ret	4	(Brazil) Alexandre Negrão	Hitech Piquet Sports	0	Did not finish	18	
DSQ	5	(Venezuela) Ernesto Viso	BCN Competición	40	Disqualified^{1}	6	
Fastest lap: Nico Rosberg (ART Grand Prix) — 1:27.672 (on lap 3)

Notes

- ^1 – Ernesto Viso finished seventh but was disqualified after the race when his car was found to be underweight in the post-race inspection.

=== Sprint race ===
Pos.	No.	Driver	Team	Laps	Time/Retired	Grid	Points
1	11	(France) Olivier Pla	DPR	27	39:54.758	1	6
2	7	(Italy) Giorgio Pantano	Super Nova International	27	+6.900	3	5
3	1	(United States) Scott Speed	iSport International	27	+7.400	5	4
4	9	(Germany) Nico Rosberg	ART Grand Prix	27	+7.600	8	5
5	19	(Spain) Borja García	Racing Engineering	27	+16.600	2	2
6	22	(Finland) Heikki Kovalainen	Arden International	27	+17.700	4	1
7	23	(France) Nicolas Lapierre	Arden International	27	+18.400	9	
8	3	(Brazil) Nelson Piquet Jr.	Hitech Piquet Sports	27	+20.000	6	
9	10	(France) Alexandre Prémat	ART Grand Prix	27	+20.800	7	
10	14	(France) José María López	DAMS	27	+21.700	13	
11	8	(United Kingdom) Adam Carroll	Super Nova International	27	+23.700	19	
12	5	(Venezuela) Ernesto Viso	BCN Competición	27	+27.900	24	
13	12	(United Kingdom) Ryan Sharp	DPR	27	+34.000	11	
14	17	(Italy) Gianmaria Bruni	Coloni Motorsport	27	+37.000	15	
15	25	(Italy) Ferdinando Monfardini	Durango	27	+37.500	22	
16	15	(United Kingdom) Fairuz Fauzy	DAMS	27	+47.000	20	
17	24	(Monaco) Clivio Piccione	Durango	27	+48.000	17	
18	4	(Brazil) Alexandre Negrão	Hitech Piquet Sports	27	+51.400	23	
19	21	(Spain) Sergio Hernández	Campos Racing	27	+1:05.500	21	
20	2	(Turkey) Can Artam	iSport International	27	+1:05.800	16	
21	16	(Austria) Mathias Lauda	Coloni Motorsport	27	+1:08.500	14	
Ret	18	(Switzerland) Neel Jani	Racing Engineering	24	Did not finish	18	
Ret	6	(Japan) Hiroki Yoshimoto	BCN Competición	21	Did not finish	12	
Ret	20	(Spain) Juan Cruz Álvarez	Campos Racing	17	Did not finish	10	
Fastest lap: Nico Rosberg (ART Grand Prix) — 1:27.245 (on lap 23)

== Standings after the round ==
Drivers' Championship standings

Pos.	Driver	Points
1	(Finland) Heikki Kovalainen	69
2	(Germany) Nico Rosberg	63
3	(United States) Scott Speed	50
4	(United Kingdom) Adam Carroll	34
5	(Italy) Gianmaria Bruni	33

Teams' Championship standings

	Pos.	Team	Points
1	1	(France) ART Grand Prix	95
1	2	(Netherlands) Arden International	81
	3	(United Kingdom) Super Nova International	52
	4	(United Kingdom) iSport International	52
	5	(Italy) Coloni Motorsport	36

- Note: Only the top five positions are included for both sets of standings.

Previous round: 2005 Silverstone GP2 Series round	GP2 Series; 2005 season	Next round: 2005 Hungaroring GP2 Series round
Previous round: 2004 Hockenheimring F3000 round	Hockenheimring GP2 round	Next round: 2006 Hockenheimring GP2 Series round
