= 2005 Silverstone GP2 Series round =

2005 GP2 race held in the United Kingdom

(United Kingdom) 2005 Silverstone GP2 round
Round details
- Round 6 of 12 rounds in the 2005 GP2 Series
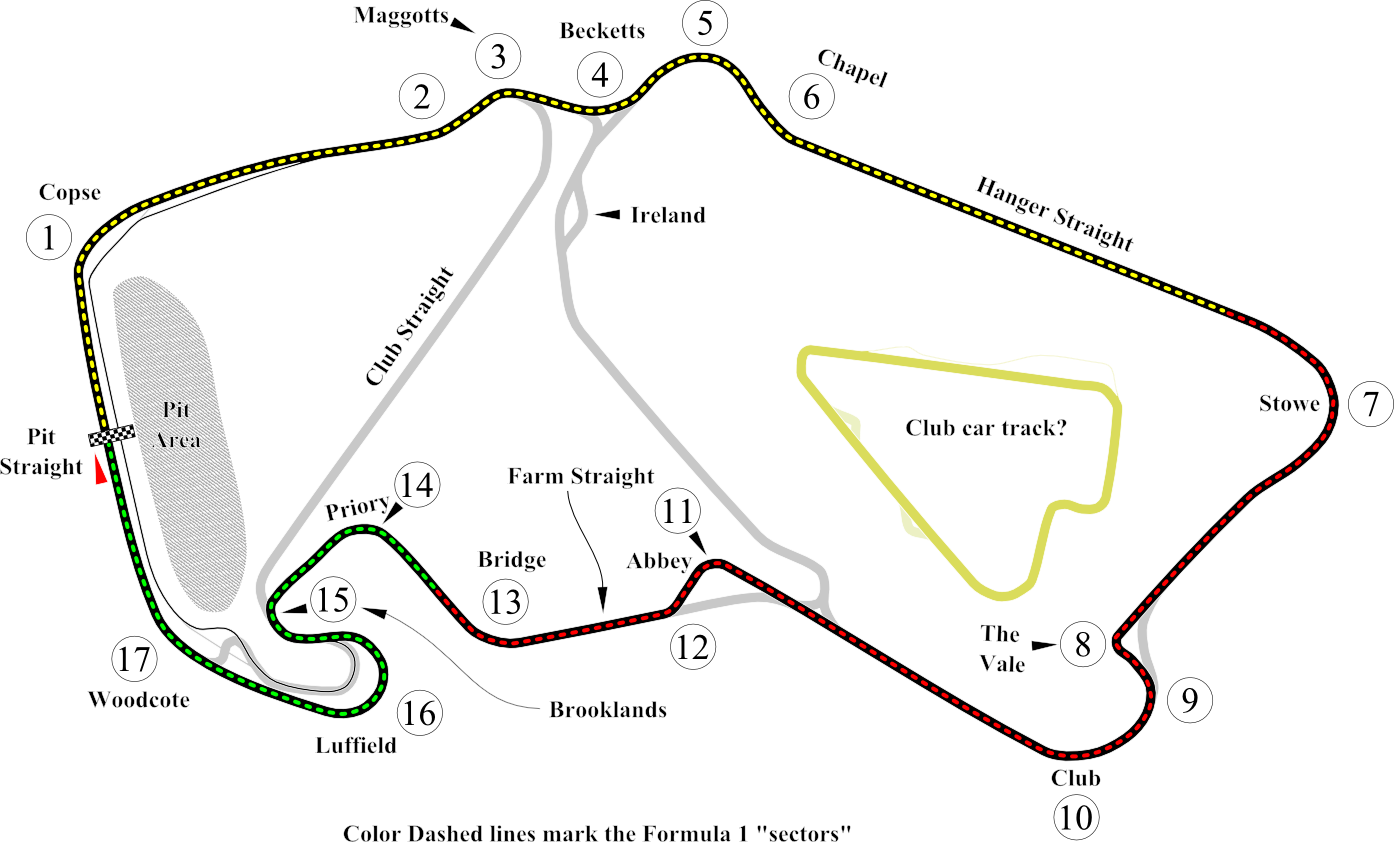
- Silverstone Circuit
- Location: Silverstone Circuit, Northamptonshire and Buckinghamshire, England
- Course: Permanent racing circuit 5.141 km (3.194 mi)

GP2 Series

Feature race
- Date: 9 July 2005
- Laps: 36

Pole position
Driver	(Germany) Nico Rosberg	ART Grand Prix
- Time: 1:31.509

Podium
First	(Germany) Nico Rosberg	ART Grand Prix
Second	(Finland) Heikki Kovalainen	Arden International
Third	(France) Alexandre Prémat	ART Grand Prix

Fastest lap
Driver	(France) Alexandre Prémat	ART Grand Prix
- Time: 1:35.326 (on lap 4)

Sprint race
- Date: 10 July 2005
- Laps: 24

Podium
First	(France) Olivier Pla	DPR
Second	(United States) Scott Speed	iSport International
Third	(Finland) Heikki Kovalainen	Arden International

Fastest lap
Driver	(United States) Scott Speed	iSport International
- Time: 1:35.092 (on lap 2)

The 2005 Silverstone GP2 Series round was a GP2 Series motor race held on 9 and 10 July 2005 at Silverstone Circuit, United Kingdom. It was the sixth round of the 2005 GP2 Series season. The race weekend supported the 2005 British Grand Prix.

Nico Rosberg, who was the polesitter for race one, took his first GP2 feature race win, his second consecutive victory after also winning the sprint race at Magny-Cours. The feature race podium was completed by championship leader Heikki Kovalainen, of Arden International, and Rosberg's ART Grand Prix teammate Alexandre Prémat.

Olivier Pla, who was on reverse grid pole after finishing eighth in the feature race, took his and DPR's first win of the season, ahead of iSport's Scott Speed and Kovalainen.

== Classification ==
=== Qualifying ===
Pos.	No.	Driver	Team	Time	Gap	Grid
1	9	(Germany) Nico Rosberg	ART Grand Prix	1:31.509		1
2	3	(Brazil) Nelson Piquet Jr.	Hitech Piquet Sports	1:31.550	+0.041	2
3	22	(Finland) Heikki Kovalainen	Arden International	1:31.929	+0.420	3
4	10	(France) Alexandre Prémat	ART Grand Prix	1:31.987	+0.478	14^{1}
5	8	(United Kingdom) Adam Carroll	Super Nova International	1:32.004	+0.495	4
6	18	(Switzerland) Neel Jani	Racing Engineering	1:32.190	+0.681	5
7	14	(Argentina) José María López	DAMS	1:32.298	+0.789	6
8	1	(United States) Scott Speed	iSport International	1:32.339	+0.830	7
9	7	(Italy) Giorgio Pantano	Super Nova International	1:32.359	+0.850	8
10	23	(France) Nicolas Lapierre	Arden International	1:32.374	+0.865	9
11	24	(Monaco) Clivio Piccione	Durango	1:32.395	+0.886	10
12	17	(Italy) Gianmaria Bruni	Coloni Motorsport	1:32.446	+0.937	11
13	11	(France) Olivier Pla	DPR	1:32.467	+0.958	12
14	20	(Spain) Juan Cruz Álvarez	Campos Racing	1:32.793	+1.284	13
15	5	(Venezuela) Ernesto Viso	BCN Competición	1:32.816	+1.307	24^{2}
16	19	(Spain) Borja García	Racing Engineering	1:32.848	+1.339	15
17	6	(Japan) Hiroki Yoshimoto	BCN Competición	1:32.941	+1.432	16
18	25	(Italy) Ferdinando Monfardini	Durango	1:32.953	+1.444	17
19	15	(United Kingdom) Fairuz Fauzy	DAMS	1:33.006	+1.497	18
20	21	(Spain) Sergio Hernández	Campos Racing	1:33.226	+1.717	19
21	12	(United Kingdom) Ryan Sharp	DPR	1:33.298	+1.789	20
22	2	(Turkey) Can Artam	iSport International	1:34.033	+2.524	21
23	4	(Brazil) Alexandre Negrão	Hitech Piquet Sports	1:34.109	+2.600	22
24	16	(Austria) Mathias Lauda	Coloni Motorsport	1:34.692	+3.183	23
107% time: 1:37.914

Notes

- ^1 – Alexandre Prémat received a ten-place penalty for causing a collision with José María López in the Magny-Cours sprint race.
- ^2 – Ernesto Viso received a ten-place penalty for causing a collision with Olivier Pla in the Magny-Cours sprint race.

=== Feature race ===
Pos.	No.	Driver	Team	Laps	Time/Retired	Grid	Points
1	9	(Germany) Nico Rosberg	ART Grand Prix	36	58:26.373	1	12
2	22	(Finland) Heikki Kovalainen	Arden International	36	+0.500	3	8
3	10	(France) Alexandre Prémat	ART Grand Prix	36	+26.300	14	8
4	1	(United States) Scott Speed	iSport International	36	+29.700	7	5
5	18	(Switzerland) Neel Jani	Racing Engineering	36	+50.500	5	4
6	24	(Monaco) Clivio Piccione	Durango	36	+51.000	10	3
7	17	(Italy) Gianmaria Bruni	Coloni Motorsport	36	+56.800	11	2
8	11	(France) Olivier Pla	DPR	36	+58.000	12	1
9	14	(Argentina) José María López	DAMS	36	+58.300	6	
10	23	(France) Nicolas Lapierre	Arden International	36	+1:00.900	9	
11	20	(Spain) Juan Cruz Álvarez	Campos Racing	36	+1:01.300	13	
12	7	(Italy) Giorgio Pantano	Super Nova International	36	+1:03.700	8	
13	6	(Japan) Hiroki Yoshimoto	BCN Competición	36	+1:04.300	16	
14	25	(Italy) Ferdinando Monfardini	Durango	36	+1:06.100	17	
15	5	(Venezuela) Ernesto Viso	BCN Competición	36	+1:18.900	24	
16	21	(Spain) Sergio Hernández	Campos Racing	36	+1:29.500	19	
17	19	(Spain) Borja García	Racing Engineering	36	+1:35.000	15	
18	2	(Turkey) Can Artam	iSport International	35	+1 lap	21	
19	4	(Brazil) Alexandre Sarnes Negrão	Hitech Piquet Sports	35	+1 lap	22	
20	16	(Austria) Mathias Lauda	Coloni Motorsport	35	+1 lap	23	
21	8	(United Kingdom) Adam Carroll	Super Nova International	34	+2 laps/DNF	4	
Ret	15	(United Kingdom) Fairuz Fauzy	DAMS	30	Did not finish	18	
Ret	12	(United Kingdom) Ryan Sharp	DPR	1	Did not finish	20	
DNS	3	(Brazil) Nelson Piquet Jr.	Hitech Piquet Sports	0	Did not start	2	
Fastest lap: Alexandre Prémat (ART Grand Prix) — 1:35.326 (on lap 4)

=== Sprint race ===
Pos.	No.	Driver	Team	Laps	Time/Retired	Grid	Points
1	11	(France) Olivier Pla	DPR	24	40:09.933	1	6
2	1	(United States) Scott Speed	iSport International	24	+0.500	5	7
3	22	(Finland) Heikki Kovalainen	Arden International	24	+1.200	7	4
4	9	(Germany) Nico Rosberg	ART Grand Prix	24	+1.800	8	3
5	10	(France) Alexandre Prémat	ART Grand Prix	24	+5.500	6	2
6	18	(Switzerland) Neel Jani	Racing Engineering	24	+6.700	4	1
7	7	(Italy) Giorgio Pantano	Super Nova International	24	+8.400	12	
8	8	(United Kingdom) Adam Carroll	Super Nova International	24	+11.200	21	
9	19	(Spain) Borja García	Racing Engineering	24	+12.200	17	
10	25	(Italy) Ferdinando Monfardini	Durango	24	+13.700	14	
11	17	(Italy) Gianmaria Bruni	Coloni Motorsport	24	+15.400	2	
12	21	(Spain) Sergio Hernández	Campos Racing	24	+23.500	16	
13	5	(Venezuela) Ernesto Viso	BCN Competición	24	+29.600	15	
14	2	(Turkey) Can Artam	iSport International	24	+37.800	18	
15	16	(Austria) Mathias Lauda	Coloni Motorsport	24	+38.300	20	
16	4	(Brazil) Alexandre Negrão	Hitech Piquet Sports	23	+1 lap	19	
Ret	24	(Monaco) Clivio Piccione	Durango	19	Did not finish	3	
Ret	12	(United Kingdom) Ryan Sharp	DPR	18	Did not finish	23	
Ret	23	(France) Nicolas Lapierre	Arden International	16	Did not finish	10	
Ret	3	(Brazil) Nelson Piquet Jr.	Hitech Piquet Sports	8	Did not finish	24	
Ret	20	(Spain) Juan Cruz Álvarez	Campos Racing	5	Did not finish	11	
DNS	14	(Argentina) José María López	DAMS	0	Did not start	9	
DNS	6	(Japan) Hiroki Yoshimoto	BCN Competición	0	Did not start	13	
DNS	15	(United Kingdom) Fairuz Fauzy	DAMS	0	Did not start	22	
Fastest lap: Scott Speed (iSport International) — 1:35.092 (on lap 2)

== Standings after the round ==
Drivers' Championship standings

	Pos.	Driver	Points
	1	(Finland) Heikki Kovalainen	64
2	2	(Germany) Nico Rosberg	44
2	3	(United States) Scott Speed	41
2	4	(United Kingdom) Adam Carroll	34
2	5	(Italy) Gianmaria Bruni	33

Teams' Championship standings

	Pos.	Team	Points
	1	(Netherlands) Arden International	76
1	2	(France) ART Grand Prix	68
1	3	(United Kingdom) Super Nova International	44
1	4	(United Kingdom) iSport International	43
1	5	(Italy) Coloni Motorsport	36

- Note: Only the top five positions are included for both sets of standings.

Previous round: 2005 Magny-Cours GP2 Series round	GP2 Series; 2005 season	Next round: 2005 Hockenheimring GP2 Series round
Previous round: 2004 Silverstone F3000 round	Silverstone GP2 round	Next round: 2006 Silverstone GP2 Series round
