= 2005 Bahrain GP2 Series round =

Car racing competition

2005 Bahrain GP2 round
Round details
- Round 12 of 12 rounds in the 2005 GP2 Series
- Bahrain International Circuit
- Location: Bahrain International Circuit, Sakhir, Bahrain
- Course: Permanent racing facility 5.412 km (3.363 mi)

GP2 Series

Feature race
- Date: 29 September 2005
- Laps: 34 (184.008 km)

Pole position
Driver	(Germany) Nico Rosberg	ART Grand Prix
- Time: 1:44.643

Podium
First	(Germany) Nico Rosberg	ART Grand Prix
Second	(France) Alexandre Prémat	ART Grand Prix
Third	(Finland) Heikki Kovalainen	Arden International

Fastest lap
Driver	(France) Alexandre Prémat	ART Grand Prix
- Time: 1:47.766 (on lap 25)

Sprint race
- Date: 30 September 2005
- Laps: 23 (124.476 km)

Podium
First	(Germany) Nico Rosberg	ART Grand Prix
Second	(Venezuela) Ernesto Viso	BCN Competición
Third	(France) Alexandre Prémat	ART Grand Prix

Fastest lap
Driver	(United States) Scott Speed	iSport International
- Time: 1:47.401 (on lap 3)

The 2005 Bahrain GP2 Series round was a GP2 Series motor race held on September 29 and 30, 2005 at the Bahrain International Circuit in Sakhir, Bahrain. It was the final showdown of the 2005 GP2 Series season. The race weekend was a stand-alone event unlike the previous GP2 rounds which support Formula One Grands Prix.

== Background ==
Coming into the final round of the season, Nico Rosberg held a five-point lead in the driver's championship from Heikki Kovalainen with 22 points up for grabs in the final round at the Bahrain International Circuit.

== Classification ==
=== Qualifying ===
Pos.	No.	Driver	Team	Time		Gap	Grid
Pos.	No.	Driver	Team	Q1	Q2	Gap	Grid
1	9	(Germany) Nico Rosberg	ART Grand Prix	1:46.526	1:44.643		1
2	22	(Finland) Heikki Kovalainen	Arden International	1:46.205	1:45.318	+0.675	2
3	23	(France) Nicolas Lapierre	Arden International	1:47.308	1:45.532	+0.889	3
4	7	(Italy) Giorgio Pantano	Super Nova International	1:47.621	1:45.541	+0.898	4
5	10	(France) Alexandre Prémat	ART Grand Prix	1:47.900	1:45.581	+0.938	5
6	5	(Venezuela) Ernesto Viso	BCN Competición	1:47.572	1:45.713	+1.070	6
7	1	(United States) Scott Speed	iSport International	1:46.685	1:45.790	+1.147	7
8	17	(Italy) Ferdinando Monfardini	Coloni Motorsport	1:48.022	1:45.958	+1.315	8
9	25	(Italy) Gianmaria Bruni	Durango	1:46.919	1:45.967	+1.324	9
10	14	(Argentina) José María López	DAMS	1:47.754	1:46.031	+1.388	10
11	19	(Spain) Borja García	Racing Engineering	1:47.930	1:46.254	+1.611	11
12	24	(Monaco) Clivio Piccione	Durango	1:47.731	1:46.466	+1.823	12
13	20	(Argentina) Juan Cruz Álvarez	Campos Racing	1:47.858	1:46.634	+1.991	13
14	6	(Japan) Hiroki Yoshimoto	BCN Competición	1:48.417	1:46.847	+2.204	14
15	11	(France) Olivier Pla	DPR	1:48.916	1:47.072	+2.429	15
16	12	(Switzerland) Giorgio Mondini	DPR	1:48.333	1:47.101	+2.458	16
17	3	(Brazil) Nelson Piquet Jr.	Hitech Piquet Sports	No time	1:47.109	+2.466	17
18	21	(Spain) Sergio Hernández	Campos Racing	1:48.339	1:47.125	+2.482	18
19	8	(United Kingdom) Adam Carroll	Super Nova International	1:47.149	1:47.270	+2.506	19
20	15	(Malaysia) Fairuz Fauzy	DAMS	1:48.868	1:47.259	+2.616	20
21	16	(Austria) Mathias Lauda	Coloni Motorsport	1:48.732	1:47.555	+2.912	21
22	2	(Turkey) Can Artam	iSport International	1:48.794	1:48.885	+4.151	22
23	4	(Brazil) Alexandre Negrão	Hitech Piquet Sports	1:49.044	No time	+4.401	23
24	18	(Switzerland) Neel Jani	Racing Engineering	No time	No time		24

- Nelson Piquet Jr. and Adam Carroll had their two fastest times deleted for speeding under yellow flags during Q2. Piquet had been due to start from 7th and Carroll 11th start grid.

=== Feature race ===
Pos.	No.	Driver	Team	Laps	Time/Retired	Grid	Points
1	9	(Germany) Nico Rosberg	ART Grand Prix	34	1:03:34.327	1	12(10+2)
2	10	(France) Alexandre Prémat	ART Grand Prix	34	+11.557	5	10(8+2)
3	22	(Finland) Heikki Kovalainen	Arden International	34	+18.768	2	6
4	14	(Argentina) José María López	DAMS	34	+33.723	10	5
5	7	(Italy) Giorgio Pantano	Super Nova International	34	+38.348	4	4
6	23	(France) Nicolas Lapierre	Arden International	34	+43.930	3	3
7	6	(Japan) Hiroki Yoshimoto	BCN Competición	34	+54.077	14	2
8	5	(Venezuela) Ernesto Viso	BCN Competición	34	+54.478	6	1
9	8	(United Kingdom) Adam Carroll	Super Nova International	34	+56.071	19	
10	20	(Argentina) Juan Cruz Álvarez	Campos Racing	34	+1:07.712	13	
11	15	(Malaysia) Fairuz Fauzy	DAMS	34	+1:09.416	20	
12	4	(Brazil) Alexandre Negrão	Hitech Piquet Sports	34	+1:10.016	23	
13	24	(Monaco) Clivio Piccione	Durango	34	+1:14.937	12	
14	16	(Austria) Mathias Lauda	Coloni Motorsport	34	+1:22.167	21	
15	21	(Spain) Sergio Hernández	Campos Racing	34	+1:27.321	18	
16	18	(Switzerland) Neel Jani	Racing Engineering	34	+1:33.179	24	
17	2	(Turkey) Can Artam	iSport International	34	+1:36.993	22	
18	12	(Switzerland) Giorgio Mondini	DPR	33	+1 lap	16	
19	19	(Spain) Borja García	Racing Engineering	31	+3 laps	11	
Ret	11	(France) Olivier Pla	DPR	29	Gearbox	15	
Ret	17	(Italy) Ferdinando Monfardini	Coloni Motorsport	20	Electrics	8	
Ret	3	(Brazil) Nelson Piquet Jr.	Hitech Piquet Sports	13	Hydraulics	17	
Ret	1	(United States) Scott Speed	iSport International	10	Brakes	7	
Ret	25	(Italy) Gianmaria Bruni	Durango	7	Gearbox	9	
Fastest lap: Alexandre Prémat (ART Grand Prix) — 1:47.766 (on lap 25)

=== Sprint race ===
Pos.	No.	Driver	Team	Laps	Time/Retired	Grid	Points
1	9	(Germany) Nico Rosberg	ART Grand Prix	23	41:44.937	8	6
2	5	(Venezuela) Ernesto Viso	BCN Competición	23	+8.335	1	5
3	10	(France) Alexandre Prémat	ART Grand Prix	23	+9.353	7	4
4	14	(Argentina) José María López	DAMS	23	+16.260	5	3
5	7	(Italy) Giorgio Pantano	Super Nova International	23	+22.649	4	2
6	6	(Japan) Hiroki Yoshimoto	BCN Competición	23	+30.698	2	1
7	24	(Monaco) Clivio Piccione	Durango	23	+31.115	13	
8	8	(United Kingdom) Adam Carroll	Super Nova International	23	+32.974	9	
9	4	(Brazil) Alexandre Negrão	Hitech Piquet Sports	23	+33.853	12	
10	15	(Malaysia) Fairuz Fauzy	DAMS	23	+34.571	11	
11	17	(Italy) Ferdinando Monfardini	Coloni Motorsport	23	+34.844	21	
12	20	(Argentina) Juan Cruz Álvarez	Campos Racing	23	+35.402	10	
13	18	(Switzerland) Neel Jani	Racing Engineering	23	+38.027	16	
14	25	(Italy) Gianmaria Bruni	Durango	23	+41.669	24	
15	3	(Brazil) Nelson Piquet Jr.	Hitech Piquet Sports	23	+44.106	22	
16	2	(Turkey) Can Artam	iSport International	23	+49.552	17	
17	19	(Spain) Borja García	Racing Engineering	23	+50.243	19	
18	21	(Spain) Sergio Hernández	Campos Racing	23	+1:25.107	15	
19	1	(United States) Scott Speed	iSport International	22	+1 lap	PL	2
20	23	(France) Nicolas Lapierre	Arden International	22	+1 lap	3	
21	16	(Austria) Mathias Lauda	Coloni Motorsport	22	+1 lap	14	
22	12	(Switzerland) Giorgio Mondini	DPR	22	+1 lap	18	
Ret	22	(Finland) Heikki Kovalainen	Arden International	0	Spun off	6	
DNS	11	(France) Olivier Pla	DPR	0	Gearbox	20	
Fastest lap: Scott Speed (iSport International) — 1:47.401 (on lap 3)

- Oliver Pla was unable to start the race due to an gearbox failure.
- Scott Speed started the race from the pitlane.

== Standings after the round ==
Drivers' Championship standings

Pos.	Driver	Points
1	(Germany) Nico Rosberg	120
2	(Finland) Heikki Kovalainen	105
3	(United States) Scott Speed	67.5
4	(France) Alexandre Prémat	67
5	(United Kingdom) Adam Carroll	53

Teams' Championship standings

Pos.	Team	Points
1	(France) ART Grand Prix	187
2	(United Kingdom) Arden International	126
3	(United Kingdom) Super Nova International	102
4	(United Kingdom) iSport International	69.5
5	(Spain) Racing Engineering	65.5

- Note: Only the top five positions are included for both sets of standings.

Previous round: 2005 Spa-Francorchamps GP2 Series round	GP2 Series; 2005 season	Next round: 2006 Valencia GP2 Series round
Previous round: none	Bahrain GP2 round	Next round: 2007 Bahrain GP2 Series round
