= 2005 Spa-Francorchamps GP2 Series round =

(Belgium) 2005 Spa-Francorchamps GP2 round
Round details
- Round 11 of 12 rounds in the 2005 GP2 Series
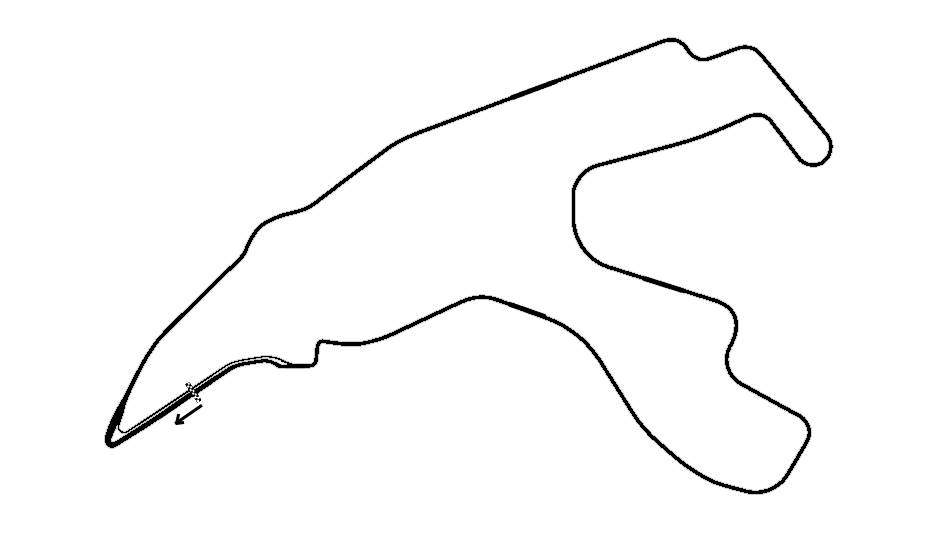
- Spa-Francorchamps
- Location: Circuit de Spa-Francorchamps, Stavelot, Belgium
- Course: Permanent racing facility 6.976 km (4.334 mi)

GP2 Series

Feature race
- Date: 10 September 2005
- Laps: 26 (181.376 km)

Pole position
| Driver | (Italy) Gianmaria Bruni | Durango |
- Time: 2:14.173

Podium
| First | (Brazil) Nelson Piquet Jr. | Hitech Piquet Sports |
| Second | (Venezuela) Ernesto Viso | BCN Competición |
| Third | (Germany) Nico Rosberg | ART Grand Prix |

Fastest lap
| Driver | (France) Alexandre Prémat (Note: Alexandre Prémat did not finish the race so the points were given to Adam Carroll.) | ART Grand Prix |
- Time: 2:07.563 (on lap 3)

Sprint race
- Date: 11 September 2005
- Laps: 9 (62.784 km)

Podium
| First | (United Kingdom) Adam Carroll | Super Nova International |
| Second | (Spain) Borja García | Racing Engineering |
| Third | (Venezuela) Ernesto Viso | BCN Competición |

Fastest lap
| Driver | (United Kingdom) Adam Carroll | Super Nova International |
- Time: 2:14.936 (on lap 7)

The 2005 Spa-Francorchamps GP2 Series round was a GP2 Series motor race held on 10 and 11 September 2005 at the Circuit de Spa-Francorchamps in Stavelot, Belgium. It was the penultimate round of the 2005 GP2 Series season. The race weekend supported the 2005 Belgian Grand Prix.

== Classification ==
=== Qualifying ===
| Pos. | No. | Driver | Team | Time | Gap | Grid |
|---|---|---|---|---|---|---|
| 1 | 25 | (Italy) Gianmaria Bruni | Durango | 2:14.273 | | 1 |
| 2 | 10 | (France) Alexandre Prémat | ART Grand Prix | 2:14.661 | +0.388 | 2 |
| 3 | 23 | (France) Nicolas Lapierre | Arden International | 2:14.708 | +0.435 | 3 |
| 4 | 22 | (Finland) Heikki Kovalainen | Arden International | 2:14.872 | +0.599 | 4 |
| 5 | 3 | (Brazil) Nelson Piquet Jr. | Hitech Piquet Sports | 2:14.885 | +0.612 | 5 |
| 6 | 1 | (United States) Scott Speed | iSport International | 2:14.897 | +0.624 | 6 |
| 7 | 6 | (Japan) Hiroki Yoshimoto | BCN Competición | 2:15.163 | +0.890 | 7 |
| 8 | 8 | (United Kingdom) Adam Carroll | Super Nova International | 2:15.174 | +0.901 | 8 |
| 9 | 7 | (Italy) Giorgio Pantano | Super Nova International | 2:15.229 | +0.956 | 9 |
| 10 | 14 | (France) José María López | DAMS | 2:15.238 | +0.965 | 10 |
| 11 | 9 | (Germany) Nico Rosberg | ART Grand Prix | 2:15.240 | +0.967 | 11 |
| 12 | 5 | (Venezuela) Ernesto Viso | BCN Competición | 2:15.290 | +1.017 | 12 |
| 13 | 11 | (France) Olivier Pla | DPR | 2:15.725 | +1.425 | 13 |
| 14 | 24 | (Monaco) Clivio Piccione | Durango | 2:15.845 | +1.572 | 14 |
| 15 | 18 | (Switzerland) Neel Jani | Racing Engineering | 2:15.869 | +1.596 | 15 |
| 16 | 15 | (United Kingdom) Fairuz Fauzy | DAMS | 2:16.434 | +2.161 | 16 |
| 17 | 12 | (Italy) Giorgio Mondini | DPR | 2:16.497 | +2.224 | 17 |
| 18 | 17 | (Finland) Toni Vilander | Coloni Motorsport | 2:16.769 | +2.496 | 18 |
| 19 | 4 | (Brazil) Alexandre Negrão | Hitech Piquet Sports | 2:16.924 | +2.651 | 19 |
| 20 | 19 | (Spain) Borja García | Racing Engineering | 2:17.166 | +2.893 | 20 |
| 21 | 20 | (Spain) Juan Cruz Álvarez | Campos Racing | 2:17.208 | +2.935 | 21 |
| 22 | 21 | (Spain) Sergio Hernández | Campos Racing | 2:17.579 | +3.306 | 22 |
| 23 | 16 | (Austria) Mathias Lauda | Coloni Motorsport | 2:18.498 | +4.225 | 23 |
| 24 | 2 | (Turkey) Can Artam | iSport International | 2:18.801 | +4.528 | 24 |
107% time: 2:23.672

=== Feature race ===
| Pos. | No. | Driver | Team | Laps | Time/Retired | Grid | Points |
|---|---|---|---|---|---|---|---|
| 1 | 3 | (Brazil) Nelson Piquet Jr. | Hitech Piquet Sports | 26 | 1:08:13.224 | 5 | 10 |
| 2 | 5 | (Venezuela) Ernesto Viso | BCN Competición | 26 | +3.049 | 12 | 8 |
| 3 | 9 | (Germany) Nico Rosberg | ART Grand Prix | 26 | +9.930 | 11 | 6 |
| 4 | 1 | (United States) Scott Speed | iSport International | 26 | +15.915 | 6 | 5 |
| 5 | 20 | (Spain) Juan Cruz Álvarez | Campos Racing | 26 | +18.000 | 21 | 4 |
| 6 | 19 | (Spain) Borja García | Racing Engineering | 26 | +18.976 | 20 | 3 |
| 7 | 4 | (Brazil) Alexandre Negrão | Hitech Piquet Sports | 26 | +35.065 | 19 | 2 |
| 8 | 8 | (United Kingdom) Adam Carroll | Super Nova International | 26 | +42.263 | 8 | 3 |
| 9 | 16 | (Austria) Mathias Lauda | Coloni Motorsport | 26 | +43.337 | 23 | |
| 10 | 14 | (France) José María López | DAMS | 26 | +44.128 | 10 | |
| 11 | 11 | (France) Olivier Pla | DPR | 26 | +58.011 | 13 | |
| 12 | 24 | (Monaco) Clivio Piccione | Durango | 26 | +58.602 | 14 | |
| 13 | 15 | (United Kingdom) Fairuz Fauzy | DAMS | 26 | +1:18.279 | 22 | |
| 14 | 17 | (Finland) Toni Vilander | Coloni Motorsport | 26 | +1:58.501 | 18 | |
| 15 | 22 | (Finland) Heikki Kovalainen | Arden International | 25 | +1 lap | 4 | |
| 16 | 18 | (Switzerland) Neel Jani | Racing Engineering | 23 | +3 laps | 15 | |
| Ret | 7 | (Italy) Giorgio Pantano | Super Nova International | 22 | Did not finish | 9 | |
| Ret | 21 | (Spain) Sergio Hernández | Campos Racing | 22 | Did not finish | 22 | |
| Ret | 10 | (France) Alexandre Prémat | ART Grand Prix | 16 | Collision | 2 | |
| Ret | 12 | (Italy) Giorgio Mondini | DPR | 13 | Did not finish | 17 | |
| Ret | 25 | (Italy) Gianmaria Bruni | Durango | 8 | Did not finish | 1 | 2 |
| Ret | 2 | (Turkey) Can Artam | iSport International | 3 | Did not finish | 24 | |
| Ret | 6 | (Japan) Hiroki Yoshimoto | BCN Competición | 3 | Did not finish | 7 | |
| Ret | 23 | (France) Nicolas Lapierre | Arden International | 0 | Did not finish | 3 | |
Fastest lap: Alexandre Prémat (ART Grand Prix) — 2:07.563 (on lap 3)

=== Sprint race ===
| Pos. | No. | Driver | Team | Laps^{2} | Time/Retired | Grid | Points^{3} |
|---|---|---|---|---|---|---|---|
| 1 | 8 | (United Kingdom) Adam Carroll | Super Nova International | 9 | 23:38.872 | 1 | 6 |
| 2 | 19 | (Spain) Borja García | Racing Engineering | 9 | +16.300 | 3 | 2.5 |
| 3 | 5 | (Venezuela) Ernesto Viso | BCN Competición | 9 | +25.040^{4} | 7 | 2 |
| 4 | 1 | (United States) Scott Speed | iSport International | 9 | +26.311 | 5 | 1.5 |
| 5 | 9 | (Germany) Nico Rosberg | ART Grand Prix | 9 | +31.170 | 6 | 1 |
| 6 | 20 | (Spain) Juan Cruz Álvarez | Campos Racing | 9 | +34.666 | 4 | 0.5 |
| 7 | 4 | (Brazil) Alexandre Negrão | Hitech Piquet Sports | 9 | +35.987 | 2 | |
| 8 | 14 | (France) José María López | DAMS | 9 | +38.059 | 9 | |
| 9 | 22 | (Finland) Heikki Kovalainen | Arden International | 9 | +38.321 | 14 | |
| 10 | 11 | (France) Olivier Pla | DPR | 9 | +41.986 | 10 | |
| 11 | 7 | (Italy) Giorgio Pantano | Super Nova International | 9 | +43.635 | 17 | |
| 12 | 10 | (France) Alexandre Prémat | ART Grand Prix | 9 | +48.451 | 19 | |
| 13 | 17 | (Finland) Toni Vilander | Coloni Motorsport | 9 | +51.557 | 13 | |
| 14 | 3 | (Brazil) Nelson Piquet Jr. | Hitech Piquet Sports | 9 | +52.170 | 18^{1} | |
| 15 | 15 | (United Kingdom) Fairuz Fauzy | DAMS | 9 | +54.876 | 12 | |
| 16 | 25 | (Italy) Gianmaria Bruni | Durango | 9 | +55.417 | 21 | |
| 17 | 6 | (Japan) Hiroki Yoshimoto | BCN Competición | 9 | +55.919 | 22 | |
| 18 | 18 | (Switzerland) Neel Jani | Racing Engineering | 9 | +57.455 | 15 | |
| 19 | 24 | (Monaco) Clivio Piccione | Durango | 9 | +59.215 | 11 | |
| 20 | 21 | (Spain) Sergio Hernández | Campos Racing | 9 | +1:08.028 | 16 | |
| 21 | 12 | (Italy) Giorgio Mondini | DPR | 9 | +1:10.508 | 20 | |
| 22 | 2 | (Turkey) Can Artam | iSport International | 9 | +1:16.403 | 23 | |
| 23 | 23 | (France) Nicolas Lapierre | Arden International | 9 | +1:26.822 | 24 | |
| 24 | 16 | (Austria) Mathias Lauda | Coloni Motorsport | 9 | +1:44.105 | 8 | |
Fastest lap: Adam Carroll (Super Nova International) — 2:14.936 (on lap 7)

Notes

- ^1 – Nelson Piquet Jr. was given a ten place grid penalty for colliding with Alexandre Prémat in the feature race.
- ^2 – The race was originally set to cover 18 laps (125.568 km) but the results were based on the classification at the end of lap nine.
- ^3 – Half-points were awarded for the race as the field failed to cover 75% of the original race distance.
- ^4 – Ernesto Viso was reinstated to third position after the race having originally been classified at the back of the field after his accident.

== Standings after the round ==
Drivers' Championship standings

| | Pos. | Driver | Points |
|---|---|---|---|
| 1 | 1 | (Germany) Nico Rosberg | 102 |
| 1 | 2 | (Finland) Heikki Kovalainen | 99 |
| | 3 | (United States) Scott Speed | 65.5 |
| 2 | 4 | (United Kingdom) Adam Carroll | 53 |
| 1 | 5 | (France) Alexandre Prémat | 53 |

Teams' Championship standings

| Pos. | Team | Points |
|---|---|---|
| 1 | (France) ART Grand Prix | 155 |
| 2 | (United Kingdom) Arden International | 117 |
| 3 | (United Kingdom) Super Nova International | 96 |
| 4 | (United Kingdom) iSport International | 67.5 |
| 5 | (Spain) Racing Engineering | 65.5 |

- Note: Only the top five positions are included for both sets of standings.

== Notes ==
| Previous round: 2005 Monza GP2 Series round | GP2 Series; 2005 season | Next round: 2005 Bahrain GP2 Series round |
| Previous round: 2004 Spa-Francorchamps F3000 round | Spa-Francorchamps GP2 round | Next round: 2007 Spa-Francorchamps GP2 Series round |
