= Marcello Puglisi =

Italian racing driver

- Nationality: (Italy) Italian
- Born: May 17, 1986 (age 40) Trescore Balneario (Italy)

International Formula Master career
- Debut season: 2007
- Current team: ADM Motorsport
- Car number: 15
- Former teams: Promotorsport; Cram Competition
- Starts: 34
- Wins: 2
- Poles: 0
- Fastest laps: 0
- Best finish: 5th in 2007

Previous series
- 2008 2008 2008 2007 2006 2006 2006 2005 2003–05 2003, 2005: Formula Master Italia; GP2 Asia Series; GP2 Series; Le Mans Series; F3000 International Masters; Euroseries 3000; Italian Formula 3000; Italian F3; Formula Renault 2.0 Italia; Eurocup Formula Renault 2.0

Championship titles
- 2008: Formula Master Italia

Marcello Puglisi (born May 17, 1986 in Trescore Balneario) is an Italian former racing driver.

== Career ==
=== Formula Renault ===
Puglisi began his car racing career by driving in the Italian Formula Renault Championship and Formula Renault Eurocup in 2003. He remained in the Italian series for three years, with a best finish of 13th in the drivers' championship. In 2003 and 2005, he competed in a total of six Eurocup events, failing to score any points in the process.

=== Formula Three ===
In 2005, Puglisi also drove in one race of the Italian Formula Three Championship, scoring three points at his first and only attempt at the formula.

=== Formula 3000 ===
Puglisi drove in both the Euroseries 3000 and the rival Formula 3000 International Masters championship for 2006. He scored no points in the former, but secured tenth place in the drivers' championship in the latter.

=== International Formula Master ===
In 2007, Puglisi competed in the inaugural International Formula Master season. In his most successful year in motorsport yet, he won one race on his way towards fifth in the drivers' championship. He remained in the category for 2008.

=== Sports Car Racing ===
Puglisi also drove in a single round of the Le Mans Series in 2007 for the Scuderia Lavaggi team in the LMP1, scoring no points.

=== GP2 Series ===
Puglisi was signed by the Piquet Sports team to drive in the first GP2 Asia Series season for 2008. Driving alongside compatriot Marco Bonanomi, he did not score any points. Having committed to another season of Formula Master, he nevertheless took his opportunity to compete in the 2008 GP2 Series proper as a replacement for Davide Valsecchi in the Durango team, who was injured in a high-speed crash at the second round of the championship in Turkey. Puglisi took part in the next round of the championship, but was then replaced by Ben Hanley.

== Racing record ==
=== Career summary ===
Season	Series	Team name	Races	Poles	Wins	Points	Position
2003	Formula Renault 2.0 Italia	Cram Competition	10	0	0	2	26th
2003	Eurocup Formula Renault 2.0	Cram Competition	4	0	0	0	NC
2004	Formula Renault 2.0 Italia	RP Motorsport	17	0	0	34	13th
2005	Formula Renault 2.0 Italia	JD Motorsport	8	0	0	16	21st
2005	Eurocup Formula Renault 2.0	JD Motorsport	2	0	0	0	NC
2005	Italian Formula Three	RP Motorsport	1	0	0	3	15th
2006	Formula 3000 International Masters	Alan Racing	9	0	0	21	10th
2006	Euroseries 3000	Euronova	8	0	0	0	NC
2007	International Formula Master	Promotorsport	16	0	1	47	5th
2007	Le Mans Series - LMP1	Scuderia Lavaggi	1	0	0	0	NC
2008	GP2 Series	Durango	2	0	0	0	33rd
2008	GP2 Asia Series	Piquet Sports	10	0	0	0	25th
2008	International Formula Master	Cram Competition	16	0	1	19	11th
2008	Formula Master Italia	Cram Competition	12	0	2	75	**1st**
2009	International Formula Master	ADM Motorsport	2	0	0	1	19th

=== Complete Eurocup Formula Renault 2.0 results ===
(key) (Races in bold indicate pole position; races in italics indicate fastest lap)

Year	Entrant	1	2	3	4	5	6	7	8	9	10	11	12	13	14	15	16	DC	Points
2005	JD Motorsport	ZOL; 1 Ret	ZOL; 2; 29	VAL; 1	VAL; 2	LMS; 1	LMS; 2	BIL; 1	BIL; 2	OSC; 1	OSC; 2	DON; 1	DON; 2	EST; 1	EST; 2	MNZ; 1	MNZ; 2	48th	0

=== Complete GP2 Series results ===
(key) (Races in bold indicate pole position) (Races in italics indicate fastest lap)

Year	Entrant	1	2	3	4	5	6	7	8	9	10	11	12	13	14	15	16	17	18	19	20	DC	Points
2008	Durango	ESP; FEA	ESP; SPR	TUR; FEA	TUR; SPR	MON; FEA; 17	MON; SPR; 19	FRA; FEA	FRA; SPR	GBR; FEA	GBR; SPR	GER; FEA	GER; SPR	HUN; FEA	HUN; SPR	EUR; FEA	EUR; SPR	BEL; FEA	BEL; SPR	ITA; FEA	ITA; SPR	33rd	0

==== Complete GP2 Asia Series results ====
(key) (Races in bold indicate pole position) (Races in italics indicate fastest lap)

Year	Entrant	1	2	3	4	5	6	7	8	9	10	DC	Points
2008	Piquet Sports	DUB; FEA; 16	DUB; SPR; Ret	SEN; FEA; DNS	SEN; SPR; 18	SEP; FEA; 13	SEP; SPR; 9	BHR; FEA; 18	BHR; SPR; Ret	DUB; FEA; Ret	DUB; SPR; Ret	25th	0
