= 2008 Spa-Francorchamps GP2 Series round =

(Belgium) 2008 Belgian GP2 round
Round details
- Round 9 of 10 rounds in the 2008 GP2 Series
- Circuit de Spa-Francorchamps
- Location: Circuit de Spa-Francorchamps, Francorchamps, Wallonia, Belgium
- Course: Permanent racing facility 7.004 km (4.352 mi)

GP2 Series

Feature race
- Date: 6 September 2008
- Laps: 26

Pole position
Driver	(Brazil) Bruno Senna	iSport International
- Time: 2:15.550

Podium
First	(France) Romain Grosjean	ART Grand Prix
Second	(Portugal) Álvaro Parente	Super Nova Racing
Third	(Venezuela) Pastor Maldonado	Piquet Sports

Fastest lap
Driver	(France) Romain Grosjean	ART Grand Prix
- Time: 1:59.529 (on lap 26)

Sprint race
- Date: 7 September 2008
- Laps: 18

Podium
First	(Venezuela) Pastor Maldonado	Piquet Sports
Second	(Belgium) Jérôme d'Ambrosio	DAMS
Third	(Russia) Vitaly Petrov	Barwa Int. Campos Team

Fastest lap
Driver	(Venezuela) Pastor Maldonado	Piquet Sports
- Time: 1:58.860 (on lap 5)

2008 Spa-Francorchamps GP2 Series round was the penultimate round of the 2008 GP2 Series season. It was held on 6 September and 7, 2008 at Circuit de Spa-Francorchamps near the village of Francorchamps, Wallonia, Belgium. The race was used as a support race to the 2008 Belgian Grand Prix.

== Classification ==
=== Qualifying ===
Pos.	No.	Driver	Team	Time	Grid
1	1	(India) Karun Chandhok	iSport International	2:15.489	16
2	2	(Brazil) Bruno Senna	iSport International	2:15.550	1
3	8	(Portugal) Álvaro Parente	Super Nova Racing	2:16.100	2
4	4	(France) Romain Grosjean	ART Grand Prix	2:16.280	3
5	12	(Italy) Giorgio Pantano	Racing Engineering	2:16.291	4
6	22	(United Arab Emirates) Andreas Zuber	Piquet Sports	2:16.370	5
7	14	(Switzerland) Sébastien Buemi	Trust Team Arden	2:16.786	11
8	20	(United Kingdom) Mike Conway	Trident Racing	2:16.853	6
9	7	(Spain) Andy Soucek	Super Nova Racing	2:16.958	7
10	23	(Venezuela) Pastor Maldonado	Piquet Sports	2:17.310	8
11	5	(Russia) Vitaly Petrov	Barwa International Campos Team	2:17.374	9
12	17	(Brazil) Alberto Valerio	Durango	2:17.587	10
13	16	(Italy) Davide Valsecchi	Durango	2:17.757	12
14	25	(Brazil) Diego Nunes	David Price Racing	2:17.857	13
15	19	(Estonia) Marko Asmer	FMS International	2:17.969	14
16	26	(Spain) Adrián Vallés	BCN Competición	2:18.097	15
17	18	(Spain) Roldán Rodríguez	FMS International	2:18.170	17
18	24	(Romania) Michael Herck	David Price Racing	2:18.206	18
19	21	(China) Ho-Pin Tung	Trident Racing	2:18.836	19
20	15	(Italy) Luca Filippi	Trust Team Arden	2:19.174	20
21	9	(Belgium) Jérôme d'Ambrosio	DAMS	2:19.394	21
22	11	(Spain) Javier Villa	Racing Engineering	2:21.482	22
23	27	(Brazil) Carlos Iaconelli	BCN Competición	2:22.089	23
24	3	(Japan) Sakon Yamamoto	ART Grand Prix	2:22.764	24
25	10	(Japan) Kamui Kobayashi	DAMS	2:24.020	25
26	6	(Brazil) Lucas di Grassi	Barwa International Campos Team	2:30.459	26

=== Feature race ===
Pos.	No.	Driver	Team	Laps	Time/Retired	Grid	Points
1	4	(France) Romain Grosjean	ART Grand Prix	26	1:02:33.710	3	10+1
2	8	(Portugal) Álvaro Parente	Super Nova Racing	26	+4.139	2	8
3	23	(Venezuela) Pastor Maldonado	Piquet Sports	26	+6.308	8	6
4	5	(Russia) Vitaly Petrov	Barwa International Campos Team	26	+6.783	9	5
5	14	(Switzerland) Sébastien Buemi	Trust Team Arden	26	+8.711	11	4
6	7	(Spain) Andy Soucek	Super Nova Racing	26	+8.939	7	3
7	20	(United Kingdom) Mike Conway	Trident Racing	26	+9.549	6	2
8	9	(Belgium) Jérôme d'Ambrosio	DAMS	26	+10.846	21	1
9	10	(Japan) Kamui Kobayashi	DAMS	26	+12.790	25	
10	1	(India) Karun Chandhok	iSport International	26	+13.048	16	
11	2	(Brazil) Bruno Senna	iSport International	26	+13.383	1	2
12	25	(Brazil) Diego Nunes	David Price Racing	26	+14.176	13	
13	26	(Spain) Adrián Vallés	BCN Competición	26	+14.903	15	
14	24	(Romania) Michael Herck	David Price Racing	26	+16.537	18	
15	21	(China) Ho-Pin Tung	Trident Racing	26	+17.315	19	
16	19	(Estonia) Marko Asmer	FMS International	26	+17.935	14	
17	11	(Spain) Javier Villa	Racing Engineering	26	+18.204	22	
18	3	(Japan) Sakon Yamamoto	ART Grand Prix	26	+19.705	24	
19	15	(Italy) Luca Filippi	Trust Team Arden	26	+43.184	20	
20	6	(Brazil) Lucas di Grassi	Barwa International Campos Team	25	+1 lap	26	
21	18	(Spain) Roldán Rodríguez	FMS International	25	+1 lap	17	
Ret	17	(Brazil) Alberto Valerio	Durango	21	Accident	10	
Ret	16	(Italy) Davide Valsecchi	Durango	9	Accident	12	
Ret	27	(Brazil) Carlos Iaconelli	BCN Competición	3	Accident	23	
DSQ	22	(United Arab Emirates) Andreas Zuber	Piquet Sports	26	Disqualified	5	
DSQ	12	(Italy) Giorgio Pantano	Racing Engineering	26	Disqualified	4	

=== Sprint race ===
Pos.	No.	Driver	Team	Laps	Time/Retired	Grid	Points
1	23	(Venezuela) Pastor Maldonado	Piquet Sports	18	39:35.689	6	6+1
2	9	(Belgium) Jérôme d'Ambrosio	DAMS	18	+1.256	1	5
3	5	(Russia) Vitaly Petrov	Barwa International Campos Team	18	+5.439	5	4
4	14	(Switzerland) Sébastien Buemi	Trust Team Arden	18	+6.390	4	3
5	6	(Brazil) Lucas di Grassi	Barwa International Campos Team	18	+7.222	20	2
6	16	(Italy) Davide Valsecchi	Durango	18	+8.213	23	1
7	1	(India) Karun Chandhok	iSport International	18	+8.767	10	
8	11	(Spain) Javier Villa	Racing Engineering	18	+12.199	17	
9	4	(France) Romain Grosjean	ART Grand Prix	18	+16.317	8	
10	21	(China) Ho-Pin Tung	Trident Racing	18	+17.065	15	
11	24	(Romania) Michael Herck	David Price Racing	18	+18.351	14	
12	27	(Brazil) Carlos Iaconelli	BCN Competición	18	+20.023	24	
13	26	(Spain) Adrián Vallés	BCN Competición	18	+20.350	13	
14	10	(Japan) Kamui Kobayashi	DAMS	18	+32.890	9	
Ret	7	(Spain) Andy Soucek	Super Nova Racing	15	Crash	3	
Ret	15	(Italy) Luca Filippi	Trust Team Arden	12	Collision Damage	19	
Ret	19	(Estonia) Marko Asmer	FMS International	10	Retired	16	
Ret	2	(Brazil) Bruno Senna	iSport International	9	Accident	11	
Ret	25	(Brazil) Diego Nunes	David Price Racing	7	Collision	12	
Ret	8	(Portugal) Álvaro Parente	Super Nova Racing	5	Accident	7	
Ret	17	(Brazil) Alberto Valerio	Durango	5	Accident	22	
Ret	20	(United Kingdom) Mike Conway	Trident Racing	4	Accident	2	
Ret	18	(Spain) Roldán Rodríguez	FMS International	4	Accident	21	
Ret	3	(Japan) Sakon Yamamoto	ART Grand Prix	2	Retired	18	
Ret	22	(United Arab Emirates) Andreas Zuber	Piquet Sports	1	Accident	25	
EX	12	(Italy) Giorgio Pantano	Racing Engineering	0	Excluded	26	

Previous round: 2008 Valencia GP2 Series round	GP2 Series; 2008 season	Next round: 2008 Monza GP2 Series round
Previous round: 2007 Spa-Francorchamps GP2 Series round	Spa-Francorchamps GP2 Series round	Next round: 2009 Spa-Francorchamps GP2 Series round
