= 2008 Silverstone GP2 Series round =

2008 GP2 race held in the United Kingdom

(United Kingdom) 2008 Silverstone GP2 round
Round details
- Round 5 of 10 rounds in the 2008 GP2 Series
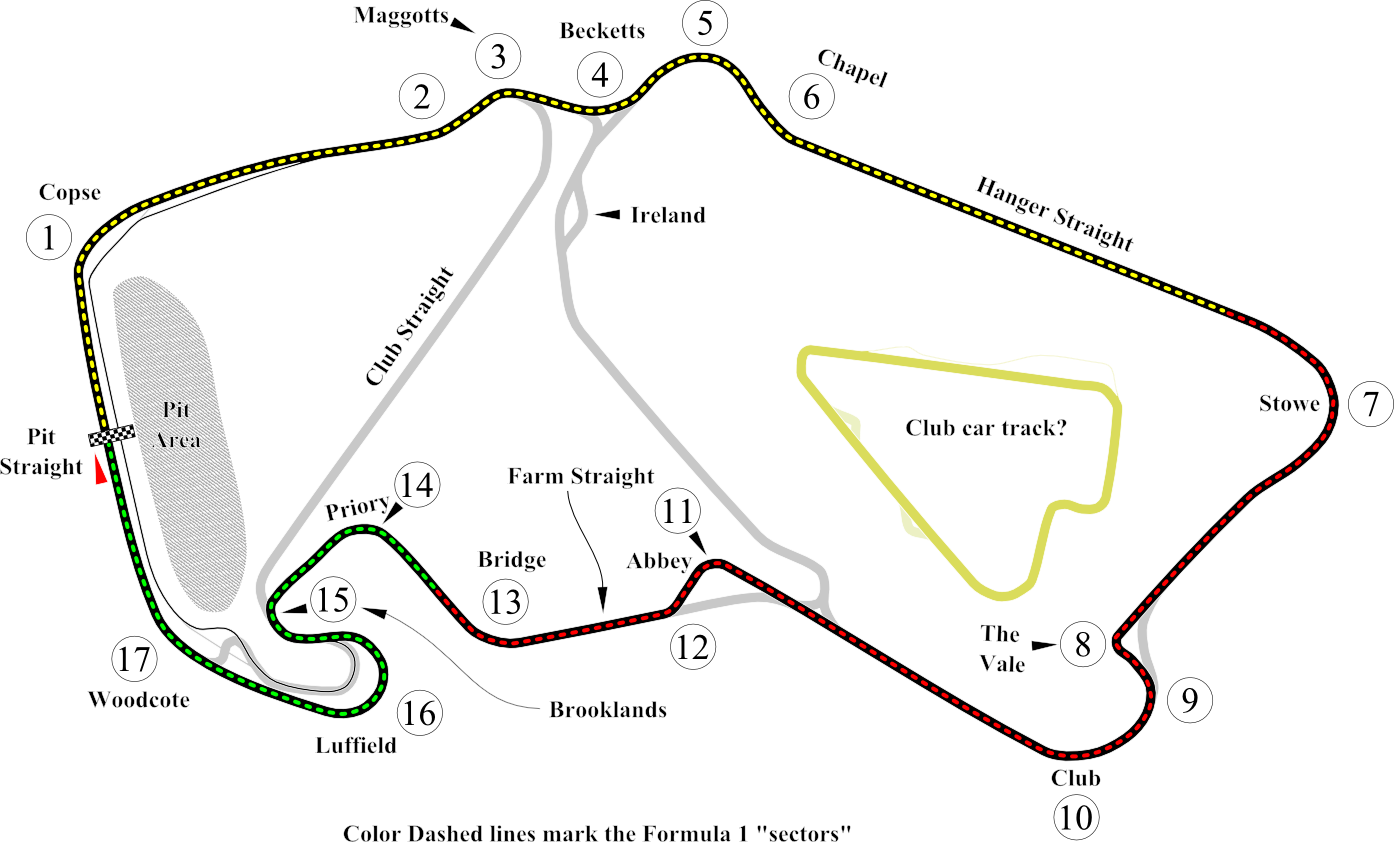
- Silverstone Circuit
- Location: Silverstone Circuit, Northamptonshire and Buckinghamshire, England
- Course: Permanent racing circuit 5.141 km (3.194 mi)

GP2 Series

Feature race
- Date: 5 July 2008
- Laps: 36

Pole position
Driver	(Brazil) Bruno Senna	iSport International
- Time: 1:26.912

Podium
First	(Italy) Giorgio Pantano	Racing Engineering
Second	(Brazil) Lucas di Grassi	Barwa Int. Campos Team
Third	(India) Karun Chandhok	iSport International

Fastest lap
Driver	(Italy) Giorgio Pantano	Racing Engineering
- Time: 1:31.995 (on lap 27)

Sprint race
- Date: 6 July 2008
- Laps: 24

Podium
First	(Brazil) Bruno Senna	iSport International
Second	(Brazil) Lucas di Grassi	Barwa Int. Campos Team
Third	(Italy) Giorgio Pantano	Racing Engineering

Fastest lap
Driver	(Russia) Vitaly Petrov	Barwa Int. Campos Team
- Time: 1:47.801 (on lap 21)

2008 Silverstone GP2 Series round was a GP2 Series motor race held on 5 and 6 July 2008 at Silverstone Circuit, United Kingdom. It was the fifth round of the 2008 GP2 Series season. The race weekend supported the 2008 British Grand Prix.

== Classification ==
=== Qualifying ===
Pos.	No.	Driver	Team	Time	Grid
1	2	(Brazil) Bruno Senna	iSport International	1:26.912	1
2	4	(France) Romain Grosjean	ART Grand Prix	1:27.034	2
3	22	(United Arab Emirates) Andreas Zuber	Piquet Sports	1:27.147	3
4	6	(Brazil) Lucas di Grassi	Barwa International Campos Team	1:27.350	4
5	12	(Italy) Giorgio Pantano	Racing Engineering	1:27.487	5
6	3	(Italy) Luca Filippi	ART Grand Prix	1:27.554	6
7	7	(Spain) Andy Soucek	Super Nova Racing	1:27.699	7
8	20	(United Kingdom) Mike Conway	Trident Racing	1:27.754	8
9	10	(Japan) Kamui Kobayashi	DAMS	1:27.774	9
10	1	(India) Karun Chandhok	iSport International	1:27.785	10
11	23	(Venezuela) Pastor Maldonado	Piquet Sports	1:27.845	11
12	14	(Switzerland) Sébastien Buemi	Trust Team Arden	1:27.921	12
13	11	(Spain) Javier Villa	Racing Engineering	1:28.163	13
14	9	(Belgium) Jérôme d'Ambrosio	DAMS	1:28.172	14
15	26	(Spain) Adrián Vallés	BCN Competición	1:28.174	15
16	5	(Russia) Vitaly Petrov	Barwa International Campos Team	1:28.228	16
17	8	(Portugal) Álvaro Parente	Super Nova Racing	1:28.365	17
18	25	(Brazil) Diego Nunes	David Price Racing	1:28.442	18
19	18	(Spain) Roldán Rodríguez	FMS International	1:28.590	19
20	21	(China) Ho-Pin Tung	Trident Racing	1:28.595	20
21	16	(Italy) Davide Valsecchi	Durango	1:28.751	21
22	19	(Estonia) Marko Asmer	FMS International	1:28.857	22
23	17	(Brazil) Alberto Valerio	Durango	1:29.027	23
24	15	(Netherlands) Yelmer Buurman	Trust Team Arden	1:29.107	24
25	27	(Brazil) Carlos Iaconelli	BCN Competición	1:29.429	25
26	24	(Romania) Michael Herck	David Price Racing	1:29.615	26

=== Feature race ===
Pos.	No.	Driver	Team	Laps	Time/Retired	Grid	Points
1	12	(Italy) Giorgio Pantano	Racing Engineering	36	56:38.094	5	10+1
2	6	(Brazil) Lucas di Grassi	Barwa International Campos Team	36	+4.060	4	8
3	1	(India) Karun Chandhok	iSport International	36	+10.280	10	6
4	14	(Switzerland) Sébastien Buemi	Trust Team Arden	36	+15.114	12	5
5	4	(France) Romain Grosjean	ART Grand Prix	36	+18.842	2	4
6	2	(Brazil) Bruno Senna	iSport International	36	+18.988	1	3+2
7	22	(United Arab Emirates) Andreas Zuber	Piquet Sports	36	+20.205	3	2
8	3	(Italy) Luca Filippi	ART Grand Prix	36	+23.311	6	1
9	9	(Belgium) Jérôme d'Ambrosio	DAMS	36	+25.590	14	
10	5	(Russia) Vitaly Petrov	Barwa International Campos Team	36	+35.431	16	
11	18	(Spain) Roldán Rodríguez	FMS International	36	+36.886	19	
12	7	(Spain) Andy Soucek	Super Nova Racing	36	+40.911	7	
13	11	(Spain) Javier Villa	Racing Engineering	36	+50.712	13	
14	20	(United Kingdom) Mike Conway	Trident Racing	36	+53.147	8	
15	15	(Netherlands) Yelmer Buurman	Trust Team Arden	36	+53.384	24	
16	8	(Portugal) Álvaro Parente	Super Nova Racing	36	+56.497	17	
17	25	(Brazil) Diego Nunes	David Price Racing	36	+59.654	18	
18	21	(China) Ho-Pin Tung	Trident Racing	36	+1:01.002	20	
19	16	(Italy) Davide Valsecchi	Durango	36	+1:01.263	21	
20	19	(Estonia) Marko Asmer	FMS International	36	+1:04.667	22	
21	17	(Brazil) Alberto Valerio	Durango	36	+1:07.767	23	
22	26	(Spain) Adrián Vallés	BCN Competición	36	+1:16.876	15	
23	24	(Romania) Michael Herck	David Price Racing	35	+1 lap	26	
Ret	23	(Venezuela) Pastor Maldonado	Piquet Sports	30	Accident	11	
Ret	10	(Japan) Kamui Kobayashi	DAMS	20	Retired	9	
DNS	27	(Brazil) Carlos Iaconelli	BCN Competición	0	Did not start	25	

=== Sprint race ===
Pos.	No.	Driver	Team	Laps	Time/Retired	Grid	Points
1	2	(Brazil) Bruno Senna	iSport International	24	44:29.867	3	6
2	6	(Brazil) Lucas di Grassi	Barwa International Campos Team	24	+8.598	7	5
3	12	(Italy) Giorgio Pantano	Racing Engineering	24	+9.420	8	4
4	20	(United Kingdom) Mike Conway	Trident Racing	24	+17.784	14	3
5	5	(Russia) Vitaly Petrov	Barwa International Campos Team	24	+23.390	10	2+1
6	16	(Italy) Davide Valsecchi	Durango	24	+1:02.921	19	1
7	10	(Japan) Kamui Kobayashi	DAMS	24	+1:17.083	25	
8	4	(France) Romain Grosjean	ART Grand Prix	24	+1:16.083	4	
9	17	(Brazil) Alberto Valerio	Durango	24	+1:19.835	21	
10	15	(Netherlands) Yelmer Buurman	Trust Team Arden	23	+1 lap	15	
11	22	(United Arab Emirates) Andreas Zuber	Piquet Sports	23	+1 lap	2	0
12	9	(Belgium) Jérôme d'Ambrosio	DAMS	23	+1 lap	9	0
13	19	(Estonia) Marko Asmer	FMS International	23	+1 lap	20	0
14	26	(Spain) Adrián Vallés	BCN Competición	22	+2 laps	22	0
15	23	(Venezuela) Pastor Maldonado	Piquet Sports	22	+2 laps	24	0
Ret	11	(Spain) Javier Villa	Racing Engineering	20	Spins	13	0
Ret	18	(Spain) Roldán Rodríguez	FMS International	20	Spins	11	0
Ret	27	(Brazil) Carlos Iaconelli	BCN Competición	17	Spins	26	0
Ret	7	(Spain) Andy Soucek	Super Nova Racing	14	Crash	12	0
Ret	3	(Italy) Luca Filippi	ART Grand Prix	8	Spins	1	0
Ret	21	(China) Ho-Pin Tung	Trident Racing	3	Spins	18	0
Ret	1	(India) Karun Chandhok	iSport International	0	Spins	6	0
Ret	8	(Portugal) Álvaro Parente	Super Nova Racing	0	Spins	16	0
Ret	25	(Brazil) Diego Nunes	David Price Racing	0	Spins	17	0
DNS	14	(Switzerland) Sébastien Buemi	Trust Team Arden	0	Crash	5	0
DNS	24	(Romania) Michael Herck	David Price Racing	0	Crash	23	0

Previous round: 2008 Magny-Cours GP2 Series round	GP2 Series; 2008 season	Next round: 2008 Hockenheimring GP2 Series round
Previous round: 2007 Silverstone GP2 Series round	Silverstone GP2 round	Next round: 2009 Silverstone GP2 Series round
