= 2008 Monza GP2 Series round =

Motor racing competition

(Italy) 2008 Italian GP2 round
Round details
- Round 10 of 10 rounds in the 2008 GP2 Series
- Circuit de Monza
- Location: Circuit Monza; Monza, Italy
- Course: Permanent racing facility 5.793 km (3.6 mi)

GP2 Series

Feature race
- Date: 13 September 2008
- Laps: 32

Pole position
Driver	(Italy) Giorgio Pantano	Racing Engineering
- Time: 1:31.220

Podium
First	(Brazil) Lucas di Grassi	Barwa Int. Campos Team
Second	(Venezuela) Pastor Maldonado	Piquet Sports
Third	(Switzerland) Sébastien Buemi	Trust Team Arden

Fastest lap
Driver	(Venezuela) Pastor Maldonado	Piquet Sports
- Time: 1:36.275 (on lap 32)

Sprint race
- Date: 14 September 2008
- Laps: 21

Podium
First	(Italy) Davide Valsecchi	Durango
Second	(Spain) Roldán Rodríguez	FMS International
Third	(France) Romain Grosjean	ART Grand Prix

Fastest lap
Driver	(Italy) Giorgio Pantano	Racing Engineering
- Time: 1:47.002 (on lap 21)

2008 Monza GP2 Series round was the final race of the 2008 GP2 Series season. It was held on September 13 and 14, 2008 at Autodromo Nazionale Monza at Monza, Italy. The race was used as a support race to the 2008 Italian Grand Prix.

== Classification ==
=== Qualifying ===
Pos.	No.	Driver	Team	Time	Grid
1	12	(Italy) Giorgio Pantano	Racing Engineering	1:31.220	1
2	6	(Brazil) Lucas di Grassi	Barwa International Campos Team	1:31.239	2
3	14	(Switzerland) Sébastien Buemi	Trust Team Arden	1:31.330	3
4	15	(Italy) Luca Filippi	Trust Team Arden	1:31.440	4
5	5	(Russia) Vitaly Petrov	Barwa International Campos Team	1:31.527	5
6	23	(Venezuela) Pastor Maldonado	Piquet Sports	1:31.546	6
7	22	(United Arab Emirates) Andreas Zuber	Piquet Sports	1:31.663	7
8	18	(Spain) Roldán Rodríguez	FMS International	1:31.708	8
9	11	(Spain) Javier Villa	Racing Engineering	1:31.797	9
10	1	(India) Karun Chandhok	iSport International	1:31.810	10
11	4	(France) Romain Grosjean	ART Grand Prix	1:31.949	11
12	2	(Brazil) Bruno Senna	iSport International	1:31.964	12
13	16	(Italy) Davide Valsecchi	Durango	1:32.090	13
14	3	(Japan) Sakon Yamamoto	ART Grand Prix	1:32.092	14
15	7	(Spain) Andy Soucek	Super Nova Racing	1:32.165	15
16	20	(United Kingdom) Mike Conway	Trident Racing	1:32.229	16
17	25	(Brazil) Diego Nunes	David Price Racing	1:32.236	17
18	10	(Japan) Kamui Kobayashi	DAMS	1:32.361	18
19	9	(Belgium) Jérôme d'Ambrosio	DAMS	1:32.503	19
20	17	(Brazil) Alberto Valerio	Durango	1:32.550	20
21	8	(Portugal) Álvaro Parente	Super Nova Racing	1:32.604	21
22	19	(Estonia) Marko Asmer	FMS International	1:32.808	22
23	21	(China) Ho-Pin Tung	Trident Racing	1:32.817	23
24	24	(Romania) Michael Herck	David Price Racing	1:33.021	24
25	27	(Brazil) Carlos Iaconelli	BCN Competición	1:33.264	25

=== Feature race ===
Pos.	No.	Driver	Team	Laps	Time/Retired	Grid	Points
1	6	(Brazil) Lucas di Grassi	Barwa International Campos Team	32	1:00:23.203	2	10
2	23	(Venezuela) Pastor Maldonado	Piquet Sports	32	+0.736	6	8+1
3	14	(Switzerland) Sébastien Buemi	Trust Team Arden	32	+6.785	3	6
4	4	(France) Romain Grosjean	ART Grand Prix	32	+17.789	11	5
5	2	(Brazil) Bruno Senna	iSport International	32	+18.324	12	4
6	18	(Spain) Roldán Rodríguez	FMS International	32	+20.488	8	3
7	9	(Belgium) Jérôme d'Ambrosio	DAMS	32	+22.709	19	2
8	16	(Italy) Davide Valsecchi	Durango	32	+24.826	13	1
9	7	(Spain) Andy Soucek	Super Nova Racing	32	+32.866	15	
10	12	(Italy) Giorgio Pantano	Racing Engineering	32	+34.682	1	
11	1	(India) Karun Chandhok	iSport International	32	+35.259	10	0
12	20	(United Kingdom) Mike Conway	Trident Racing	32	+59.501	16	0
13	17	(Brazil) Alberto Valerio	Durango	32	+1:17.567	20	0
14	27	(Brazil) Carlos Iaconelli	BCN Competición	32	+1:51.344	25	0
15	19	(Estonia) Marko Asmer	FMS International	31	+1 lap	22	0
16	15	(Italy) Luca Filippi	Trust Team Arden	30	+2 lap	4	0
Ret	3	(Japan) Sakon Yamamoto	ART Grand Prix	27	Retired	14	0
Ret	21	(China) Ho-Pin Tung	Trident Racing	26	Retired	23	0
Ret	24	(Romania) Michael Herck	David Price Racing	22	Retired	24	0
Ret	8	(Portugal) Álvaro Parente	Super Nova Racing	19	Retired	21	0
Ret	25	(Brazil) Diego Nunes	David Price Racing	16	Retired	17	0
Ret	10	(Japan) Kamui Kobayashi	DAMS	15	Spins off	18	0
Ret	5	(Russia) Vitaly Petrov	Barwa International Campos Team	3	Collision	5	0
Ret	22	(United Arab Emirates) Andreas Zuber	Piquet Sports	3	Collision	7	0
Ret	11	(Spain) Javier Villa	Racing Engineering	3	Collision	9	0

=== Sprint race ===
Pos.	No.	Driver	Team	Laps	Time/Retired	Grid	Points
1	16	(Italy) Davide Valsecchi	Durango	21	38:09.871	1	10
2	18	(Spain) Roldán Rodríguez	FMS International	21	+9.004	3	8
3	4	(France) Romain Grosjean	ART Grand Prix	21	+9.537	5	6
4	23	(Venezuela) Pastor Maldonado	Piquet Sports	21	+10.190	7	4
5	12	(Italy) Giorgio Pantano	Racing Engineering	21	+11.428	10	2+1
6	9	(Belgium) Jérôme d'Ambrosio	DAMS	21	+16.731	2	1
7	14	(Switzerland) Sébastien Buemi	Trust Team Arden	21	+17.675	6	
8	2	(Brazil) Bruno Senna	iSport International	21	+18.540	4	
9	21	(China) Ho-Pin Tung	Trident Racing	21	+32.030	18	
10	22	(United Arab Emirates) Andreas Zuber	Piquet Sports	21	+33.641	24	
11	6	(Brazil) Lucas di Grassi	Barwa International Campos Team	21	+42.236	8	
12	8	(Portugal) Álvaro Parente	Super Nova Racing	21	+46.434	20	
13	10	(Japan) Kamui Kobayashi	DAMS	21	+46.836	22	
14	27	(Brazil) Carlos Iaconelli	BCN Competición	21	+51.080	14	
15	17	(Brazil) Alberto Valerio	Durango	21	+51.743	13	
16	25	(Brazil) Diego Nunes	David Price Racing	21	+52.565	21	
17	24	(Romania) Michael Herck	David Price Racing	21	+55.792	19	
18	7	(Spain) Andy Soucek	Super Nova Racing	21	+56.456	9	
Ret	3	(Japan) Sakon Yamamoto	ART Grand Prix	14	Retired	17	
Ret	15	(Italy) Luca Filippi	Trust Team Arden	12	Retired	16	
Ret	19	(Estonia) Marko Asmer	FMS International	8	Retired	15	
Ret	5	(Russia) Vitaly Petrov	Barwa International Campos Team	6	Collision damage	23	
Ret	20	(United Kingdom) Mike Conway	Trident Racing	3	Collision	12	
Ret	1	(India) Karun Chandhok	iSport International	0	Accident	11	
EX	11	(Spain) Javier Villa	Racing Engineering	0	Excluded	25	

Previous round: 2008 Spa-Francorchamps GP2 Series round	GP2 Series; 2008 season	Next round: 2009 Catalunya GP2 Series round
Previous round: 2007 Monza GP2 Series round	Monza GP2 round	Next round: 2009 Monza GP2 Series round
