= 2008 Hungaroring GP2 Series round =

(Hungary) 2008 Hungarian GP2 round
Round details
- Round 7 of 10 rounds in the 2008 GP2 Series
- Hungaroring
- Location: Hungaroring, Mogyoród, Pest, Hungary
- Course: Permanent racing facility 4.38 km (2.72 mi)

GP2 Series

Feature race
- Date: 2 August 2008
- Laps: 42

Pole position
Driver	(France) Romain Grosjean	ART Grand Prix
- Time: 1:27.782

Podium
First	(Brazil) Lucas di Grassi	Barwa Int. Campos Team
Second	(United Arab Emirates) Andreas Zuber	Piquet Sports
Third	(Brazil) Bruno Senna	iSport International

Fastest lap
Driver	(Venezuela) Pastor Maldonado	Piquet Sports
- Time: 1:29.910 (on lap 41)

Sprint race
- Date: 3 August 2008
- Laps: 28

Podium
First	(Switzerland) Sébastien Buemi	Trust Team Arden
Second	(Spain) Andy Soucek	Super Nova Racing
Third	(Brazil) Bruno Senna	iSport International

Fastest lap
Driver	(Brazil) Lucas di Grassi	Barwa Int. Campos Team
- Time: 1:30.367 (on lap 18)

2008 Hungaroring GP2 Series round was the seventh round of the 2008 GP2 Series season. It was held on August 2 and August 3, 2008, at Hungaroring in Mogyoród, Pest, Hungary. The race was used as a support race to the 2008 Hungarian Grand Prix.

== Classification ==
=== Qualifying ===
Pos.	No.	Driver	Team	Time	Grid
1	4	(France) Romain Grosjean	ART Grand Prix	1:27.782	1
2	22	(United Arab Emirates) Andreas Zuber	Piquet Sports	1:27.864	2
3	6	(Brazil) Lucas di Grassi	Barwa International Campos Team	1:27.866	3
4	5	(Russia) Vitaly Petrov	Barwa International Campos Team	1:28.035	4
5	1	(India) Karun Chandhok	iSport International	1:28.062	5
6	20	(United Kingdom) Mike Conway	Trident Racing	1:28.123	6
7	12	(Italy) Giorgio Pantano	Racing Engineering	1:28.203	7
8	2	(Brazil) Bruno Senna	iSport International	1:28.237	8
9	9	(Belgium) Jérôme d'Ambrosio	DAMS	1:28.413	9
10	10	(Japan) Kamui Kobayashi	DAMS	1:28.513	10
11	14	(Switzerland) Sébastien Buemi	Trust Team Arden	1:28.562	11
12	3	(Japan) Sakon Yamamoto	ART Grand Prix	1:28.730	12
13	7	(Spain) Andy Soucek	Super Nova Racing	1:28.750	13
14	25	(Brazil) Diego Nunes	David Price Racing	1:28.756	14
15	8	(Portugal) Álvaro Parente	Super Nova Racing	1:28.921	15
16	16	(Italy) Davide Valsecchi	Durango	1:28.926	16
17	21	(China) Ho-Pin Tung	Trident Racing	1:29.010	17
18	11	(Spain) Javier Villa	Racing Engineering	1:29.094	18
19	26	(Spain) Adrián Vallés	BCN Competición	1:29.188	19
20	18	(Spain) Roldán Rodríguez	FMS International	1:29.458	20
21	15	(Italy) Luca Filippi	Trust Team Arden	1:29.873	21
22	24	(Romania) Michael Herck	David Price Racing	1:30.021	22
23	27	(Brazil) Carlos Iaconelli	BCN Competición	1:30.220	23
24	19	(Estonia) Marko Asmer	FMS International	1:30.258	24
25	17	(Brazil) Alberto Valerio	Durango	No time	25
26	23	(Venezuela) Pastor Maldonado	Piquet Sports	No time	26

=== Feature race ===
Pos.	No.	Driver	Team	Laps	Time/Retired	Grid	Points
1	6	(Brazil) Lucas di Grassi	Barwa International Campos Team	42	1:04:35.028	3	10
2	22	(United Arab Emirates) Andreas Zuber	Piquet Sports	42	+0.711	2	8
3	2	(Brazil) Bruno Senna	iSport International	42	+3.611	8	6
4	1	(India) Karun Chandhok	iSport International	42	+19.046	5	5
5	23	(Venezuela) Pastor Maldonado	Piquet Sports	42	+21.883	26	4+1
6	20	(United Kingdom) Mike Conway	Trident Racing	42	+33.375	6	3
7	14	(Switzerland) Sébastien Buemi	Trust Team Arden	42	+33.621	11	2
8	7	(Spain) Andy Soucek	Super Nova Racing	42	+36.911	13	1
9	9	(Belgium) Jérôme d'Ambrosio	DAMS	42	+37.211	9	
10	3	(Japan) Sakon Yamamoto	ART Grand Prix	42	+48.359	12	
11	10	(Japan) Kamui Kobayashi	DAMS	42	+49.634	10	
12	25	(Brazil) Diego Nunes	David Price Racing	42	+56.490	14	
13	11	(Spain) Javier Villa	Racing Engineering	42	+57.463	18	
14	12	(Italy) Giorgio Pantano	Racing Engineering	42	+1:01.492	7	
15	15	(Italy) Luca Filippi	Trust Team Arden	42	+1:11.941	21	
16	8	(Portugal) Álvaro Parente	Super Nova Racing	42	+1:29.672	15	
17	4	(France) Romain Grosjean	ART Grand Prix	41	+1 lap	1	2
18	19	(Estonia) Marko Asmer	FMS International	41	+1 lap	24	
19	18	(Spain) Roldán Rodríguez	FMS International	41	+1 lap	20	
Ret	5	(Russia) Vitaly Petrov	Barwa International Campos Team	23	Retired	4	
Ret	24	(Romania) Michael Herck	David Price Racing	13	Crash	22	
Ret	16	(Italy) Davide Valsecchi	Durango	7	Crash	16	
Ret	26	(Spain) Adrián Vallés	BCN Competición	1	Crash	19	
Ret	21	(China) Ho-Pin Tung	Trident Racing	1	Crash	17	
Ret	27	(Brazil) Carlos Iaconelli	BCN Competición	0	Crash	23	
Ret	17	(Brazil) Alberto Valerio	Durango	0	Collision	25	

=== Sprint race ===
Pos.	No.	Driver	Team	Laps	Time/Retired	Grid	Points
1	14	(Switzerland) Sébastien Buemi	Trust Team Arden	28	42:29.084	2	6
2	7	(Spain) Andy Soucek	Super Nova Racing	28	+7.978	1	5
3	2	(Brazil) Bruno Senna	iSport International	28	+8.066	6	4
4	3	(Japan) Sakon Yamamoto	ART Grand Prix	28	+14.075	10	3
5	12	(Italy) Giorgio Pantano	Racing Engineering	28	+15.766	14	2
6	11	(Spain) Javier Villa	Racing Engineering	28	+16.341	13	1
7	22	(United Arab Emirates) Andreas Zuber	Piquet Sports	28	+18.533	7	
8	10	(Japan) Kamui Kobayashi	DAMS	28	+19.162	11	
9	5	(Russia) Vitaly Petrov	Barwa International Campos Team	28	+19.718	18	
10	6	(Brazil) Lucas di Grassi	Barwa International Campos Team	28	+30.140	8	1
11	20	(United Kingdom) Mike Conway	Trident Racing	28	+30.647	3	
12	4	(France) Romain Grosjean	ART Grand Prix	28	+31.225	25	
13	16	(Italy) Davide Valsecchi	Durango	28	+35.646	20	
14	21	(China) Ho-Pin Tung	Trident Racing	28	+51.478	21	
15	25	(Brazil) Diego Nunes	David Price Racing	28	+53.405	12	
16	24	(Romania) Michael Herck	David Price Racing	28	+1:00.993	19	
17	17	(Brazil) Alberto Valerio	Durango	28	+1:04.537	24	
18	23	(Venezuela) Pastor Maldonado	Piquet Sports	25	+3 laps	4	
19	26	(Spain) Adrián Vallés	BCN Competición	25	+3 laps	22	
Ret	15	(Italy) Luca Filippi	Trust Team Arden	23	Engine	15	
Ret	9	(Belgium) Jérôme d'Ambrosio	DAMS	21	Engine	9	
Ret	19	(Estonia) Marko Asmer	FMS International	12	Engine	16	
Ret	18	(Spain) Roldán Rodríguez	FMS International	8	Engine	17	
Ret	27	(Brazil) Carlos Iaconelli	BCN Competición	6	Engine	23	
Ret	8	(Portugal) Álvaro Parente	Super Nova Racing	5	Collision	26	
DNS	1	(India) Karun Chandhok	iSport International	0	Did not start	5	

Previous round: 2008 Hockenheimring GP2 Series round	GP2 Series; 2008 season	Next round: 2008 Valencia GP2 Series round
Previous round: 2007 Hungaroring GP2 Series round	Hungaroring GP2 Series round	Next round: 2009 Hungaroring GP2 Series round
