= 2008 Hockenheimring GP2 Series round =

(Germany) 2008 German GP2 round
Round details
- Round 6 of 10 rounds in the 2008 GP2 Series
- Hockenheimring
- Location: Hockenheimring, Hockenheim, Germany
- Course: Permanent racing facility 4.574 km (2.842 mi)

GP2 Series

Feature race
- Date: 19 July 2008
- Laps: 40

Pole position
| Driver | (Italy) Giorgio Pantano | Racing Engineering |
- Time: 1:21.650

Podium
| First | (Italy) Giorgio Pantano | Racing Engineering |
| Second | (France) Romain Grosjean | ART Grand Prix |
| Third | (Portugal) Álvaro Parente | Super Nova Racing |

Fastest lap
| Driver | (Italy) Giorgio Pantano | Racing Engineering |
- Time: 1:24.454 (on lap 28)

Sprint race
- Date: 20 July 2008
- Laps: 27

Podium
| First | (India) Karun Chandhok | iSport International |
| Second | (United Arab Emirates) Andreas Zuber | Piquet Sports |
| Third | (Brazil) Bruno Senna | iSport International |

Fastest lap
| Driver | (Switzerland) Sébastien Buemi | Trust Team Arden |
- Time: 1:24.317 (on lap 24)

2008 Hockenheimring GP2 Series round was a GP2 Series motor race held on July 19 and 20, 2008 at the Hockenheimring in Baden-Württemberg, Germany. It was the sixth round of the 2008 GP2 Series season. The race weekend supported the 2008 German Grand Prix.

== Classification ==
=== Qualifying ===
| Pos. | No. | Driver | Team | Time | Grid |
|---|---|---|---|---|---|
| 1 | 12 | (Italy) Giorgio Pantano | Racing Engineering | 1:21.650 | 1 |
| 2 | 4 | (France) Romain Grosjean | ART Grand Prix | 1:21.934 | 2 |
| 3 | 22 | (United Arab Emirates) Andreas Zuber | Piquet Sports | 1:22.004 | 3 |
| 4 | 14 | (Switzerland) Sébastien Buemi | Trust Team Arden | 1:22.171 | 4 |
| 5 | 6 | (Brazil) Lucas di Grassi | Barwa International Campos Team | 1:22.172 | 5 |
| 6 | 2 | (Brazil) Bruno Senna | iSport International | 1:22.216 | 6 |
| 7 | 8 | (Portugal) Álvaro Parente | Super Nova Racing | 1:22.391 | 7 |
| 8 | 10 | (Japan) Kamui Kobayashi | DAMS | 1:22.459 | 13 |
| 9 | 11 | (Spain) Javier Villa | Racing Engineering | 1:22.560 | 8 |
| 10 | 5 | (Russia) Vitaly Petrov | Barwa International Campos Team | 1:22.587 | 9 |
| 11 | 1 | (India) Karun Chandhok | iSport International | 1:22.759 | 10 |
| 12 | 3 | (Japan) Sakon Yamamoto | ART Grand Prix | 1:22.788 | 11 |
| 13 | 15 | (Italy) Luca Filippi | Trust Team Arden | 1:22.802 | 12 |
| 14 | 9 | (Belgium) Jérôme d'Ambrosio | DAMS | 1:22.907 | 14 |
| 15 | 23 | (Venezuela) Pastor Maldonado | Piquet Sports | 1:22.969 | 15 |
| 16 | 7 | (Spain) Andy Soucek | Super Nova Racing | 1:22.992 | 16 |
| 17 | 21 | (China) Ho-Pin Tung | Trident Racing | 1:23.264 | 17 |
| 18 | 16 | (Italy) Davide Valsecchi | Durango | 1:23.320 | 18 |
| 19 | 17 | (Brazil) Alberto Valerio | Durango | 1:23.378 | 19 |
| 20 | 20 | (United Kingdom) Mike Conway | Trident Racing | 1:23.433 | 20 |
| 21 | 25 | (Brazil) Diego Nunes | David Price Racing | 1:23.434 | 21 |
| 22 | 18 | (Spain) Roldán Rodríguez | FMS International | 1:23.497 | 22 |
| 23 | 27 | (Brazil) Carlos Iaconelli | BCN Competición | 1:23.913 | 23 |
| 24 | 19 | (Estonia) Marko Asmer | FMS International | 1:24.011 | 24 |
| 25 | 26 | (Spain) Adrián Vallés | BCN Competición | 1:24.273 | 24 |
| 26 | 24 | (Romania) Michael Herck | David Price Racing | 1:24.641 | 26 |

=== Feature race ===
| Pos. | No. | Driver | Team | Laps | Time/Retired | Grid | Points |
|---|---|---|---|---|---|---|---|
| 1 | 12 | (Italy) Giorgio Pantano | Racing Engineering | 40 | 59:03.426 | 1 | 10+2+1 |
| 2 | 4 | (France) Romain Grosjean | ART Grand Prix | 40 | +14.004 | 2 | 8 |
| 3 | 8 | (Portugal) Álvaro Parente | Super Nova Racing | 40 | +43.248 | 7 | 6 |
| 4 | 2 | (Brazil) Bruno Senna | iSport International | 40 | +45.658 | 6 | 5 |
| 5 | 6 | (Brazil) Lucas di Grassi | Barwa International Campos Team | 40 | +49.205 | 5 | 4 |
| 6 | 23 | (Venezuela) Pastor Maldonado | Piquet Sports | 40 | +49.410 | 15 | 3 |
| 7 | 7 | (Spain) Andy Soucek | Super Nova Racing | 40 | +50.768 | 16 | 2 |
| 8 | 1 | (India) Karun Chandhok | iSport International | 40 | +1:08.417 | 10 | 1 |
| 9 | 17 | (Brazil) Alberto Valerio | Durango | 40 | +1:36.478 | 19 | |
| 10 | 11 | (Spain) Javier Villa | Racing Engineering | 39 | Crash | 8 | |
| 11 | 22 | (United Arab Emirates) Andreas Zuber | Piquet Sports | 39 | Crash | 3 | |
| 12 | 3 | (Japan) Sakon Yamamoto | ART Grand Prix | 39 | +1 lap | 11 | |
| 13 | 21 | (China) Ho-Pin Tung | Trident Racing | 39 | +1 lap | 17 | |
| 14 | 19 | (Estonia) Marko Asmer | FMS International | 39 | +1 lap | 24 | |
| 15 | 26 | (Spain) Adrián Vallés | BCN Competición | 39 | +1 lap | 25 | |
| 16 | 27 | (Brazil) Carlos Iaconelli | BCN Competición | 39 | +1 lap | 23 | |
| 17 | 24 | (Romania) Michael Herck | David Price Racing | 39 | +1 lap | 26 | |
| 18 | 18 | (Spain) Roldán Rodríguez | FMS International | 38 | +2 laps | 22 | |
| Ret | 14 | (Switzerland) Sébastien Buemi | Trust Team Arden | 35 | Crash | 4 | |
| Ret | 20 | (United Kingdom) Mike Conway | Trident Racing | 35 | Crash | 20 | |
| Ret | 5 | (Russia) Vitaly Petrov | Barwa International Campos Team | 35 | Crash | 9 | |
| Ret | 9 | (Belgium) Jérôme d'Ambrosio | DAMS | 35 | Crash | 14 | |
| Ret | 15 | (Italy) Luca Filippi | Trust Team Arden | 33 | Crash | 12 | |
| Ret | 25 | (Brazil) Diego Nunes | David Price Racing | 33 | Crash | 21 | |
| Ret | 16 | (Italy) Davide Valsecchi | Durango | 23 | Collision | 18 | |
| Ret | 10 | (Japan) Kamui Kobayashi | DAMS | 0 | Did not finish | 13 | |

Romain Grosjean won the race, but was later issued a 25 seconds time penalty after passing a under yellow flags.[37]

=== Sprint race ===
| Pos. | No. | Driver | Team | Laps | Time/Retired | Grid | Points |
|---|---|---|---|---|---|---|---|
| 1 | 1 | (India) Karun Chandhok | iSport International | 27 | 38:27.955 | 1 | 6 |
| 2 | 22 | (United Arab Emirates) Andreas Zuber | Piquet Sports | 27 | +0.702 | 11 | 5 |
| 3 | 2 | (Brazil) Bruno Senna | iSport International | 27 | +1.274 | 5 | 4 |
| 4 | 4 | (France) Romain Grosjean | ART Grand Prix | 27 | +4.947 | 7 | 3 |
| 5 | 11 | (Spain) Javier Villa | Racing Engineering | 27 | +10.893 | 10 | 2 |
| 6 | 8 | (Portugal) Álvaro Parente | Super Nova Racing | 27 | +16.383 | 6 | 1 |
| 7 | 21 | (China) Ho-Pin Tung | Trident Racing | 27 | +17.423 | 13 | |
| 8 | 14 | (Switzerland) Sébastien Buemi | Trust Team Arden | 27 | +18.364 | 19 | |
| 9 | 20 | (United Kingdom) Mike Conway | Trident Racing | 27 | +21.808 | 24 | |
| 10 | 9 | (Belgium) Jérôme d'Ambrosio | DAMS | 27 | +27.503 | 25 | |
| 11 | 5 | (Russia) Vitaly Petrov | Barwa International Campos Team | 27 | +28.832 | 26 | |
| 12 | 19 | (Estonia) Marko Asmer | FMS International | 27 | +34.160 | 14 | |
| 13 | 16 | (Italy) Davide Valsecchi | Durango | 27 | +34.854 | 22 | |
| 14 | 17 | (Brazil) Alberto Valerio | Durango | 27 | +35.468 | 9 | |
| 15 | 18 | (Spain) Roldán Rodríguez | FMS International | 27 | +36.769 | 18 | |
| 16 | 27 | (Brazil) Carlos Iaconelli | BCN Competición | 27 | +41.765 | 16 | |
| 17 | 23 | (Venezuela) Pastor Maldonado | Piquet Sports | 27 | +46.526 | 3 | |
| 18 | 10 | (Japan) Kamui Kobayashi | DAMS | 27 | +47.554 | 23 | |
| 19 | 7 | (Spain) Andy Soucek | Super Nova Racing | 26 | +1 lap | 2 | |
| 20 | 25 | (Brazil) Diego Nunes | David Price Racing | 26 | +1 lap | 21 | |
| NC | 3 | (Japan) Sakon Yamamoto | ART Grand Prix | 20 | +7 laps | 12 | |
| Ret | 26 | (Spain) Adrián Vallés | BCN Competición | 9 | Collision damage | 15 | |
| Ret | 6 | (Brazil) Lucas di Grassi | Barwa International Campos Team | 7 | Collision | 4 | |
| Ret | 12 | (Italy) Giorgio Pantano | Racing Engineering | 2 | Engine | 8 | |
| Ret | 24 | (Romania) Michael Herck | David Price Racing | 0 | Collision | 17 | |
| Ret | 15 | (Italy) Luca Filippi | Trust Team Arden | 0 | Collision | 20 | |

| Previous round: 2008 Silverstone GP2 Series round | GP2 Series; 2008 season | Next round: 2008 Hungaroring GP2 Series round |
| Previous round: 2006 Hockenheimring GP2 Series round | Hockenheimring GP2 round | Next round: 2010 Hockenheimring GP2 Series round |
