= 2008 Monaco GP2 Series round =

Motor racing competition

2008 Monaco GP2 round
Round details
- Round 3 of 10 rounds in the 2008 GP2 Series
- Location: Circuit de Monaco, Monte Carlo, Monaco
- Course: Permanent racing facility 3.340 km (2.08 mi)

GP2 Series

Feature race
- Date: 23 May 2008
- Laps: 45

Pole position
Driver	(Venezuela) Pastor Maldonado	Piquet Sports
- Time: 1:21.057

Podium
First	(Brazil) Bruno Senna	iSport International
Second	(Venezuela) Pastor Maldonado	Piquet Sports
Third	(India) Karun Chandhok	iSport International

Fastest lap
Driver	(Brazil) Bruno Senna	iSport International
- Time: 1:21.338 (on lap 38)

Sprint race
- Date: 24 May 2008
- Laps: 30

Podium
First	(United Kingdom) Mike Conway	Trident Racing
Second	(China) Ho-Pin Tung	Trident Racing
Third	(Portugal) Álvaro Parente	Super Nova Racing

Fastest lap
Driver	(United Kingdom) Mike Conway	Trident Racing
- Time: 1:22.001 (on lap 9)

2008 Monaco GP2 Series round was a GP2 Series motor race held on 23 and 24 May 2008 at the Circuit de Monaco in Monte Carlo, Monaco. It was the third race of the 2008 GP2 Series. The race was used to support the 2008 Monaco Grand Prix.

== Classification ==
=== Qualifying ===
Pos.	No.	Driver	Team	Time	Grid
1	23	(Venezuela) Pastor Maldonado	Piquet Sports	1:21.057	1
2	2	(Brazil) Bruno Senna	iSport International	1:21.235	2
3	20	(United Kingdom) Mike Conway	Trident Racing	1:21.283	3
4	26	(Spain) Adrián Vallés	BCN Competición	1:21.368	4
5	12	(Italy) Giorgio Pantano	Racing Engineering	1:21.466	5
6	1	(India) Karun Chandhok	iSport International	1:21.614	6
7	4	(France) Romain Grosjean	ART Grand Prix	1:21.663	7
8	14	(Switzerland) Sébastien Buemi	Trust Team Arden	1:21.663	8
9	22	(United Arab Emirates) Andreas Zuber	Piquet Sports	1:21.667	24
10	9	(Belgium) Jérôme d'Ambrosio	DAMS	1:21.773	9
11	8	(Portugal) Álvaro Parente	Super Nova Racing	1:21.777	10
12	3	(Italy) Luca Filippi	ART Grand Prix	1:21.849	11
13	5	(Russia) Vitaly Petrov	Barwa International Campos Team	1:21.907	12
14	19	(United Kingdom) Adam Carroll	FMS International	1:21.981	13
15	7	(Denmark) Christian Bakkerud	Super Nova Racing	1:22.210	14
16	6	(United Kingdom) Ben Hanley	Barwa International Campos Team	1:22.697	15
17	10	(Japan) Kamui Kobayashi	DAMS	1:22.785	16
18	15	(Netherlands) Yelmer Buurman	Trust Team Arden	1:22.802	17
19	11	(Spain) Javier Villa	Racing Engineering	1:23.048	18
20	25	(Brazil) Diego Nunes	David Price Racing	1:23.224	19
21	27	(Serbia) Miloš Pavlović	BCN Competición	1.23.684	20
22	21	(China) Ho-Pin Tung	Trident Racing	1:23.798	21
23	17	(Brazil) Alberto Valerio	Durango	1:24.037	22
24	18	(Spain) Roldán Rodríguez	FMS International	1:24.283	23
25	16	(Italy) Marcello Puglisi	Durango	1:24.633	25
26	24	(Spain) Andy Soucek	David Price Racing	No time	26

=== Feature race ===
Pos.	No.	Driver	Team	Laps	Time/Retired	Grid	Points
1	2	(Brazil) Bruno Senna	iSport International	45	1:03:36.091	2	10+1
2	23	(Venezuela) Pastor Maldonado	Piquet Sports	45	+0.674	1	8+2
3	1	(India) Karun Chandhok	iSport International	45	+44.923	6	6
4	26	(Spain) Adrián Vallés	BCN Competición	45	+47.592	4	5
5	8	(Portugal) Álvaro Parente	Super Nova Racing	45	+48.191	10	4
6	18	(Spain) Roldán Rodríguez	FMS International	45	+56.857	23	3
7	21	(China) Ho-Pin Tung	Trident Racing	45	+1:17.615	21	2
8	20	(United Kingdom) Mike Conway	Trident Racing	44	Collision	3	1
9	9	(Belgium) Jérôme d'Ambrosio	DAMS	44	+1 lap	9	
10	7	(Denmark) Christian Bakkerud	Super Nova Racing	44	+1 lap	14	
11	22	(United Arab Emirates) Andreas Zuber	Piquet Sports	44	+1 lap	24	
12	15	(Netherlands) Yelmer Buurman	Trust Team Arden	44	+1 lap	17	
13	24	(Spain) Andy Soucek	David Price Racing	44	+1 lap	26	
14	11	(Spain) Javier Villa	Racing Engineering	44	+1 lap	18	
15	25	(Brazil) Diego Nunes	David Price Racing	44	+1 lap	19	
16	6	(United Kingdom) Ben Hanley	Barwa International Campos Team	44	+1 lap	15	
17	16	(Italy) Marcello Puglisi	Durango	44	+1 lap	25	
Ret	3	(Italy) Luca Filippi	ART Grand Prix	32	Crash	11	
Ret	4	(France) Romain Grosjean	ART Grand Prix	27	Crash	7	
Ret	12	(Italy) Giorgio Pantano	Racing Engineering	26	Collision	5	
Ret	14	(Switzerland) Sébastien Buemi	Trust Team Arden	26	Collision	8	
Ret	19	(United Kingdom) Adam Carroll	FMS International	26	Collision	13	
Ret	17	(Brazil) Alberto Valerio	Durango	25	Crash	22	
Ret	10	(Japan) Kamui Kobayashi	DAMS	0	Collision	16	
Ret	5	(Russia) Vitaly Petrov	Barwa International Campos Team	0	Collision	12	
DNS	27	(Serbia) Miloš Pavlović	BCN Competición	0	Did not start	20	

=== Sprint race ===
Pos.	No.	Driver	Team	Laps	Time/Retired	Grid	Points
1	20	(United Kingdom) Mike Conway	Trident Racing	30	45:31.105	1	6+1
2	21	(China) Ho-Pin Tung	Trident Racing	30	+18.446	2	5
3	8	(Portugal) Álvaro Parente	Super Nova Racing	30	+18.915	4	4
4	18	(Spain) Roldán Rodríguez	FMS International	30	+20.898	3	3
5	2	(Brazil) Bruno Senna	iSport International	30	+21.298	8	2
6	24	(Spain) Andy Soucek	David Price Racing	30	+22.256	13	1
7	9	(Belgium) Jérôme d'Ambrosio	DAMS	30	+23.188	9	
8	15	(Netherlands) Yelmer Buurman	Trust Team Arden	30	+23.887	12	
9	25	(Brazil) Diego Nunes	David Price Racing	30	+33.072	14	
10	4	(France) Romain Grosjean	ART Grand Prix	30	+33.536	18	
11	14	(Switzerland) Sébastien Buemi	Trust Team Arden	30	+35.756	20	
12	3	(Italy) Luca Filippi	ART Grand Prix	30	+37.855	17	
13	11	(Spain) Javier Villa	Racing Engineering	30	+39.162	24	
14	6	(United Kingdom) Ben Hanley	Barwa International Campos Team	30	+40.064	15	
15	5	(Russia) Vitaly Petrov	Barwa International Campos Team	30	+41.865	25	
16	26	(Spain) Adrián Vallés	BCN Competición	30	+43.233	5	
17	22	(United Arab Emirates) Andreas Zuber	Piquet Sports	29	+1 lap	11	
Ret	10	(Japan) Kamui Kobayashi	DAMS	14	Crash	23	
Ret	16	(Italy) Marcello Puglisi	Durango	11	Crash	16	
Ret	17	(Brazil) Alberto Valerio	Durango	8	Crash	22	
Ret	12	(Italy) Giorgio Pantano	Racing Engineering	7	Crash	19	
Ret	19	(United Kingdom) Adam Carroll	FMS International	2	Crash	21	
Ret	1	(India) Karun Chandhok	iSport International	0	Collision	6	
Ret	23	(Venezuela) Pastor Maldonado	Piquet Sports	0	Collision damage	7	
Ret	7	(Denmark) Christian Bakkerud	Super Nova Racing	0	Collision	10	
DNS	27	(Serbia) Miloš Pavlović	BCN Competicion	0	Did not start	26	

Previous round: 2008 Istanbul Park GP2 Series round	GP2 Series; 2008 season	Next round: 2008 Magny-Cours GP2 Series round
Previous round: 2007 Monaco GP2 Series round	Monaco GP2 round	Next round: 2009 Monaco GP2 Series round
