= 2008 GP2 Series =

Season of Formula One feeder championship

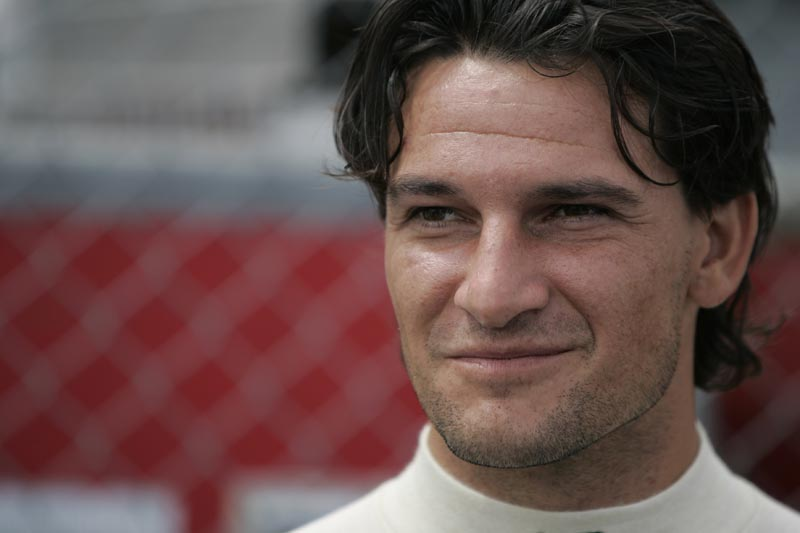
Giorgio Pantano won the championship.

The 2008 GP2 Series season was the forty-second season of the second-tier of Formula One feeder championship and also fourth season under the GP2 Series moniker. It began on 26 April at Montmeló, Spain and it finished on 14 September at Monza, Italy. This is the first season using a new car design to be used during the following 3 seasons. The series was won by Giorgio Pantano.

== Season summary ==
The fourth GP2 Series season started in Circuit de Catalunya. Pastor Maldonado took first pole position of the season, but he couldn't use the advantage after a very bad start. Alvaro Parente won in his debut race in the series. In the sprint race, Romain Grosjean was heading for victory until late-race safety car. When the safety car went back to the pits, Grosjean straight-lined the chicane and lost momentum. He then blocked Kamui Kobayashi, receiving drive through penalty. Kobayashi won the race while Grosjean was left without points.

At Turkey, Giorgio Pantano won from pole in the feature race. Grosjean won the sprint race which included several multi-car incidents on the first lap, as well as two stray dogs on the track. One of them was hit by Bruno Senna whose car was damaged and he had to retire. Luckily Senna escaped without injury. Senna then won at Monaco, on the track where his uncle Ayrton had won six times. In the sprint race, which was held for the first time in Monaco, Mike Conway was victorious. He was heading for third place in feature race before being punted off by Javier Villa on the final lap. He was lucky in the event, as only eight drivers were unlapped, so he ended in eight and therefore for the pole in the sprint.

Magny-Cours feature race was won by Pantano after Grosjean and Senna suffered mechanical retirements. The sprint race started on damp track and few drivers gambled starting with slicks. This worked well for Arden drivers, as Sébastien Buemi won from 21st on the grid. His teammate Yelmer Buurman was second. At Silverstone Pantano won the feature again, and wet sprint race was dominated by Senna.

At Hockenheim Grosjean finished first on the road, but he was later penalized for overtaking under yellow flag, giving Pantano third straight feature race victory. Karun Chandhok won the sprint race from pole. At Hungaroring, Lucas di Grassi who had returned to GP2 in Magny-Cours, won the feature race, while Buemi won the sprint after polesitter Andy Soucek made a small mistake.

The feature race at Valencia ended in dramatic fashion. Pantano was on road for victory before he ran out of fuel on the final lap. Several other drivers suffered same fate, including Senna who could get his car over the finish line but in 9th place. Vitaly Petrov inherited the win. Pantano recovered well in sprint race to take third place while Senna crashed out. di Grassi was the winner.

With four races to go, Pantano led by 13 points on Senna and 20 on di Grassi. Senna took the pole in Spa, but his race was destroyed by drive through penalty for unsafe release by the team in his pit stop. Pantano suffered mechanical glitch during safety car and was dropped to back of the field. He was recovering until he collided with di Grassi on the final lap. Pantano was disqualified for the race and also excluded from the sprint. Grosjean won the feature while Maldonado took his first victory of the season in the sprint, overtaking Jérôme d'Ambrosio on the final lap.

Pantano got perfect start for final weekend with pole, therefore knocking di Grassi out from the championship hunt. A race started in wet conditions and mandatory pit stop was done as late as possible, as the track was ready for slicks. di Grassi won while Pantano ended in 10th after drive through penalty for crossing white line at the pit exit. It didn't matter much: while Senna couldn't finish better than 5th, Pantano clinched the title with one race to go. The sprint race was held in wet conditions as well and won by polesitter Davide Valsecchi.

== Teams and drivers ==
All of the teams used the Dallara GP2/08 chassis with Renault-badged 4.0 litre (244 cu in) naturally-aspirated Mecachrome V8 engines order and with tyres supplied by Bridgestone. On 19 October 2007, it was announced that the same 13 teams which took part in 2007 would continue into 2008.

Team	No.	Driver name	Rounds
(United Kingdom) iSport International	1	(India) Karun Chandhok	All
(United Kingdom) iSport International	2	(Brazil) Bruno Senna	All
(France) ART Grand Prix	3	(Italy) Luca Filippi	1–5
(France) ART Grand Prix	3	(Japan) Sakon Yamamoto	6–10
(France) ART Grand Prix	4	(France) Romain Grosjean	All
(Spain) Barwa International Campos Team	5	(Russia) Vitaly Petrov	All
(Spain) Barwa International Campos Team	6	(United Kingdom) Ben Hanley	1–3
(Spain) Barwa International Campos Team	6	(Brazil) Lucas di Grassi	4–10
(United Kingdom) Super Nova Racing	7	(Denmark) Christian Bakkerud	1, 3
(United Kingdom) Super Nova Racing	7	(Spain) Andy Soucek	2, 4–10
(United Kingdom) Super Nova Racing	8	(Portugal) Álvaro Parente	All
(France) DAMS	9	(Belgium) Jérôme d'Ambrosio	All
(France) DAMS	10	(Japan) Kamui Kobayashi	All
(Spain) Racing Engineering	11	(Spain) Javier Villa	All
(Spain) Racing Engineering	12	(Italy) Giorgio Pantano	All
(Netherlands) Trust Team Arden (Note: Arden International competed under a Dutch licence.)	14	(Switzerland) Sébastien Buemi	All
(Netherlands) Trust Team Arden	15	(Netherlands) Yelmer Buurman	1–5
(Netherlands) Trust Team Arden	15	(Italy) Luca Filippi	6–10
(Italy) Durango	16	(Italy) Davide Valsecchi	1–2, 5–10
(Italy) Durango	16	(Italy) Marcello Puglisi	3
(Italy) Durango	16	(United Kingdom) Ben Hanley	4
(Italy) Durango	17	(Brazil) Alberto Valério	All
(Italy) Fisichella Motor Sport International	18	(Spain) Roldán Rodríguez	All
(Italy) Fisichella Motor Sport International	19	(Spain) Adrián Vallés	1
(Italy) Fisichella Motor Sport International	19	(United Kingdom) Adam Carroll	2–3
(Italy) Fisichella Motor Sport International	19	(Estonia) Marko Asmer	4–10
(Italy) Trident Racing	20	(United Kingdom) Mike Conway	All
(Italy) Trident Racing	21	(China) Ho-Pin Tung	All
(Brazil) Piquet Sports	22	(United Arab Emirates) Andreas Zuber (Note: Zuber is an Austrian driver who competed under an Emirati racing licence.)	All
(Brazil) Piquet Sports	23	(Venezuela) Pastor Maldonado	All
(United Kingdom) DPR	24	(Italy) Giacomo Ricci	1–2
(United Kingdom) DPR	24	(Spain) Andy Soucek	3
(United Kingdom) DPR	24	(Romania) Michael Herck	4–10
(United Kingdom) DPR	25	(Brazil) Diego Nunes	All
(Spain) BCN Competición	26	(Italy) Paolo Maria Nocera	1
(Spain) BCN Competición	26	(Spain) Adrián Vallés	2–10
(Spain) BCN Competición	27	(Serbia) Miloš Pavlović	1–3
(Spain) BCN Competición	27	(Brazil) Carlos Iaconelli	4–10

== Calendar ==
The original calendar was released on 25 March 2008 and had a standalone event on the 31 May – 1 June at the Valencia's Ricardo Tormo circuit. However, on the 18 April 2008, it was confirmed that a deal had been agreed for a GP2 event to run alongside the new European GP at the Valencia Street Circuit instead of the original date at the Ricardo Tormo circuit. Also, for the first time in the history of GP2, two races were held at Monaco. All of the races supported the Formula One Grands Prix indicated by the relevant flags, except the round at Valencia which supported the 2008 European Grand Prix.

Round		Location	Circuit	Date	Time		Tyres (Note: Bridgestone supplied only one dry compound to the teams to be used throughout the race weekend.)	Supporting
Round		Location	Circuit	Date	Local	UTC	Tyres	Supporting
1	F	Montmeló, Spain	Circuit de Catalunya	26 April	16:00	14:00	Hard	Spanish Grand Prix
1	S	Montmeló, Spain	Circuit de Catalunya	27 April	10:30	08:30	Hard	Spanish Grand Prix
2	F	Istanbul, Turkey	Istanbul Park	10 May	16:00	13:00	Hard	Turkish Grand Prix
2	S	Istanbul, Turkey	Istanbul Park	11 May	11:30	08:30	Hard	Turkish Grand Prix
3	F	Monte Carlo, Monaco	Circuit de Monaco	23 May	11:15	09:15	Super Soft	Monaco Grand Prix
3	S	Monte Carlo, Monaco	Circuit de Monaco	24 May	16:00	14:00	Super Soft	Monaco Grand Prix
4	F	Magny-Cours, France	Circuit de Magny-Cours	21 June	16:00	14:00	Medium	French Grand Prix
4	S	Magny-Cours, France	Circuit de Magny-Cours	22 June	10:30	08:30	Medium	French Grand Prix
5	F	(United Kingdom) Silverstone, Great Britain	Silverstone Circuit	5 July	15:00	14:00	Medium	British Grand Prix
5	S	(United Kingdom) Silverstone, Great Britain	Silverstone Circuit	6 July	09:30	08:30	Medium	British Grand Prix
6	F	Hockenheim, Germany	Hockenheimring	19 July	16:00	14:00	Medium	German Grand Prix
6	S	Hockenheim, Germany	Hockenheimring	20 July	10:30	08:30	Medium	German Grand Prix
7	F	Mogyoród, Hungary	Hungaroring	2 August	16:00	14:00	Medium	Hungarian Grand Prix
7	S	Mogyoród, Hungary	Hungaroring	3 August	10:30	08:30	Medium	Hungarian Grand Prix
8	F	Valencia, Spain	Valencia Street Circuit	23 August	16:00	14:00	Medium	European Grand Prix
8	S	Valencia, Spain	Valencia Street Circuit	24 August	10:30	08:30	Medium	European Grand Prix
9	F	Stavelot, Belgium	Circuit de Spa-Francorchamps	6 September	16:00	14:00	Medium	Belgian Grand Prix
9	S	Stavelot, Belgium	Circuit de Spa-Francorchamps	7 September	10:30	08:30	Medium	Belgian Grand Prix
10	F	Monza, Italy	Autodromo Nazionale Monza	13 September	16:00	14:00	Medium	Italian Grand Prix
10	S	Monza, Italy	Autodromo Nazionale Monza	14 September	10:30	08:30	Medium	Italian Grand Prix

The following rounds were included on the provisional calendars published by the FIA but were cancelled:

Round	Location	Circuit	Date	Supporting
F	Cheste, Spain	Circuit Ricardo Tormo	31 May	Stand-alone event
S	Cheste, Spain	Circuit Ricardo Tormo	1 June	Stand-alone event

== Results ==
Round		Circuit	Pole position	Fastest lap	Winning driver	Winning team	Report
1	F	(Spain) Circuit de Catalunya	(Venezuela) Pastor Maldonado	(Spain) Adrián Vallés (Note: Adrián Vallés set the fastest lap, but did not finish in the top 10, so was ineligible to be the point-scorer for the fastest lap. Álvaro Parente was the point-scorer instead for setting the fastest lap of those finishing in the top 10.)	(Portugal) Álvaro Parente	(United Kingdom) Super Nova Racing	Report
1	S	(Spain) Circuit de Catalunya		(France) Romain Grosjean (Note: Romain Grosjean set the fastest lap, but did not finish in the top 10, so was ineligible to be the point-scorer for the fastest lap. Kamui Kobayashi was the point-scorer instead for setting the fastest lap of those finishing in the top 10.)	(Japan) Kamui Kobayashi	(France) DAMS	Report
2	F	(Turkey) Istanbul Park	(Italy) Giorgio Pantano	(United Arab Emirates) Andreas Zuber	(Italy) Giorgio Pantano	(Spain) Racing Engineering	Report
2	S	(Turkey) Istanbul Park		(France) Romain Grosjean	(France) Romain Grosjean	(France) ART Grand Prix	Report
3	F	Circuit de Monaco	(Venezuela) Pastor Maldonado	(Brazil) Bruno Senna	(Brazil) Bruno Senna	(United Kingdom) iSport International	Report
3	S	Circuit de Monaco		(United Arab Emirates) Andreas Zuber (Note: Andreas Zuber set the fastest lap, but did not finish in the top 10, so was ineligible to be the point-scorer for the fastest lap. Mike Conway was the point-scorer instead for setting the fastest lap of those finishing in the top 10.)	(United Kingdom) Mike Conway	(Italy) Trident Racing	Report
4	F	(France) Circuit de Magny-Cours	(Brazil) Bruno Senna	(Italy) Giorgio Pantano	(Italy) Giorgio Pantano	(Spain) Racing Engineering	Report
4	S	(France) Circuit de Magny-Cours		(Japan) Kamui Kobayashi	(Switzerland) Sébastien Buemi	(Netherlands) Trust Team Arden	Report
5	F	(United Kingdom) Silverstone Circuit	(Brazil) Bruno Senna	(Italy) Giorgio Pantano	(Italy) Giorgio Pantano	(Spain) Racing Engineering	Report
5	S	(United Kingdom) Silverstone Circuit		(Venezuela) Pastor Maldonado (Note: Pastor Maldonado set the fastest lap, but did not finish in the top 10, so was ineligible to be the point-scorer for the fastest lap. Vitaly Petrov was the point-scorer instead for setting the fastest lap of those finishing in the top 10.)	(Brazil) Bruno Senna	(United Kingdom) iSport International	Report
6	F	(Germany) Hockenheimring	(Italy) Giorgio Pantano	(Italy) Giorgio Pantano	(Italy) Giorgio Pantano (Note: Romain Grosjean won the race, but was later issued a 25 seconds time penalty after passing a under yellow flags.)	(Spain) Racing Engineering	Report
6	S	(Germany) Hockenheimring		(Japan) Kamui Kobayashi (Note: Kamui Kobayashi set the fastest lap, but did not finish in the top 10, so was ineligible to be the point-scorer for the fastest lap. Sébastien Buemi was the point-scorer instead for setting the fastest lap of those finishing in the top 10.)	(India) Karun Chandhok	(United Kingdom) iSport International	Report
7	F	(Hungary) Hungaroring	(France) Romain Grosjean	(France) Romain Grosjean (Note: Romain Grosjean set the fastest lap, but did not finish in the top 10, so was ineligible to be the point-scorer for the fastest lap. Pastor Maldonado was the point-scorer instead for setting the fastest lap of those finishing in the top 10.)	(Brazil) Lucas di Grassi	(Spain) Barwa International Campos Team	Report
7	S	(Hungary) Hungaroring		(Brazil) Lucas di Grassi	(Switzerland) Sébastien Buemi	(Netherlands) Trust Team Arden	Report
8	F	(Spain) Valencia Street Circuit	(Italy) Giorgio Pantano	(Italy) Giorgio Pantano (Note: Giorgio Pantano set the fastest lap, but did not finish in the top 10, so was ineligible to be the point-scorer for the fastest lap. Pastor Maldonado was the point-scorer instead for setting the fastest lap of those finishing in the top 10.)	(Russia) Vitaly Petrov	(Spain) Barwa International Campos Team	Report
8	S	(Spain) Valencia Street Circuit		(Brazil) Lucas di Grassi	(Brazil) Lucas di Grassi	(Spain) Barwa International Campos Team	Report
9	F	(Belgium) Circuit de Spa-Francorchamps	(Brazil) Bruno Senna (Note: Karun Chandhok recorded the fastest time in qualifying, but received ten-place grid penalty for a collision in the previous race. Bruno Senna was recognised as the pole-sitter for the race.)	(France) Romain Grosjean	(France) Romain Grosjean	(France) ART Grand Prix	Report
9	S	(Belgium) Circuit de Spa-Francorchamps		(Venezuela) Pastor Maldonado	(Venezuela) Pastor Maldonado	(Brazil) Piquet Sports	Report
10	F	(Italy) Autodromo Nazionale Monza	(Italy) Giorgio Pantano	(United Kingdom) Mike Conway (Note: Mike Conway set the fastest lap, but did not finish in the top 10, so was ineligible to be the point-scorer for the fastest lap. Pastor Maldonado was the point-scorer instead for setting the fastest lap of those finishing in the top 10.)	(Brazil) Lucas di Grassi	(Spain) Barwa International Campos Team	Report
10	S	(Italy) Autodromo Nazionale Monza		(Spain) Andy Soucek (Note: Andy Soucek set the fastest lap, but did not finish in the top 10, so was ineligible to be the point-scorer for the fastest lap. Giorgio Pantano was the point-scorer instead for setting the fastest lap of those finishing in the top 10.)	(Italy) Davide Valsecchi	(Italy) Durango	Report

== Championship standings ==
Scoring system

Points are awarded to the top 8 classified finishers in the Feature race, and to the top 6 classified finishers in the Sprint race. The pole-sitter in the feature race will also receive two points, and one point is given to the driver who set the fastest lap inside the top ten in both the feature and sprint races. No extra points are awarded to the pole-sitter in the sprint race.

Feature race points

Position	**1st**	**2nd**	**3rd**	**4th**	**5th**	**6th**	**7th**	**8th**	**Pole**	**FL**
Points	10	8	6	5	4	3	2	1	2	1

Sprint race points

Points are awarded to the top 6 classified finishers.

Position	**1st**	**2nd**	**3rd**	**4th**	**5th**	**6th**	**FL**
Points	6	5	4	3	2	1	1

=== Drivers' Championship ===
Pos	Driver	CAT (Spain)		IST (Turkey)		MON (Monaco)		MAG (France)		SIL (United Kingdom)		HOC (Germany)		HUN (Hungary)		VAL (Spain)		SPA (Belgium)		MNZ (Italy)		Points
1	(Italy) Giorgio Pantano	4	3	**1**	4	Ret	Ret	1	Ret	1	3	**1**	Ret	14	5	**14**†	3	DSQ	EX	**10**	5	76
2	(Brazil) Bruno Senna	2	4	15	Ret	1	5	**Ret**	5	**6**	1	4	3	3	3	9	Ret	**11**	Ret	5	8	64
3	(Brazil) Lucas di Grassi							2	4	2	2	5	Ret	1	10	4	1	20†	5	1	11	63
4	(France) Romain Grosjean	5	13	2	1	Ret	10	Ret	Ret	5	8	2	4	**17**	12	3	Ret	1	9	4	3	62
5	(Venezuela) Pastor Maldonado	**12**	Ret	Ret	Ret	**2**	Ret	3	7	Ret	15†	6	17	5	18†	2	Ret	3	1	2	4	60
6	(Switzerland) Sébastien Buemi	7	2	6	3	Ret	11	Ret	1	4	DNS	Ret	8	7	1	6	Ret	5	4	3	7	50
7	(Russia) Vitaly Petrov	6	Ret	5	2	Ret	15	4	18†	10	5	Ret	11	Ret	9	1	15†	4	3	Ret	Ret	39
8	(Portugal) Álvaro Parente	1	7	Ret	8	5	3	9	Ret	16	Ret	3	6	16	Ret	16†	Ret	2	Ret	Ret	12	34
9	(United Arab Emirates) Andreas Zuber	3	Ret	3	Ret	11	17	5	8	7	11	11†	2	2	7	Ret	Ret	DSQ	Ret	Ret	10	32
10	(India) Karun Chandhok	9	Ret	4	12	3	Ret	7	Ret	3	Ret	8	1	4	DNS	15†	Ret	10	7	11	Ret	31
11	(Belgium) Jérôme d'Ambrosio	Ret	15	Ret	Ret	9	7	6	Ret	9	12	Ret	10	9	Ret	5	2	8	2	7	6	21
12	(United Kingdom) Mike Conway	Ret	8	9	5	8†	1	8	6	14	4	Ret	9	6	11	Ret	8	7	Ret	13	Ret	20
13	(Spain) Roldán Rodríguez	Ret	Ret	12	13	6	4	Ret	16	11	Ret	18†	15	19	Ret	Ret	10	21†	Ret	6	2	14
14	(Spain) Andy Soucek			19	Ret	13	6	13	Ret	12	Ret	7	19	8	2	7	Ret	6	Ret	9	18	14
15	(Italy) Davide Valsecchi	10	5	DNS	DNS					19	6	Ret	13	Ret	13	NC	7	Ret	6	8	1	11
16	(Japan) Kamui Kobayashi	8	1	Ret	9	Ret	Ret	Ret	9	Ret	7	Ret	18	11	8	Ret	6	9	14	Ret	13	10
17	(Spain) Javier Villa	14	6	7	15	14	13	14	10	13	Ret	10†	5	13	6	Ret	5	17	8	Ret	EX	8
18	(China) Ho-Pin Tung	Ret	14	11	Ret	7	2	Ret	14	18	Ret	13†	7	Ret	14	Ret	9	15	10	Ret	9	7
19	(Italy) Luca Filippi	11	Ret	16	14	Ret	12	10	3	8	Ret	Ret	Ret	15	Ret	8	13	19	Ret	16	Ret	6
20	(Netherlands) Yelmer Buurman	Ret	10	14	Ret	12	8	12	2	15	10											5
21	(Spain) Adrián Vallés	18	11	10	Ret	4	16	15	12	22	14†	15	Ret	Ret	19	11	Ret	13	13	WD	WD	5
22	(Brazil) Diego Nunes	15	16	13	10	15	9	11	Ret	17	Ret	Ret	20	12	15	10	4	12	Ret	Ret	16	3
23	(Japan) Sakon Yamamoto											12†	NC	10	4	Ret	Ret	18	Ret	Ret	Ret	3
24	(United Kingdom) Ben Hanley	Ret	9	17	6	16	14	Ret	Ret													1
25	(United Kingdom) Adam Carroll			8	Ret	Ret	Ret															1
26	(Brazil) Alberto Valério	13	Ret	18	7	Ret	Ret	18	17	21	9	9	14	DNS	17	Ret	12	Ret	Ret	12	15	0
27	(Denmark) Christian Bakkerud	Ret	DNS			10	Ret															0
28	(Brazil) Carlos Iaconelli							16	13	DNS	Ret	16	16	Ret	Ret	13	11	Ret	12	14	14	0
29	(Estonia) Marko Asmer							17	11	20	13	14	12	18	Ret	DNS	Ret	16	Ret	15	Ret	0
30	(Romania) Michael Herck							Ret	15	23	DNS	17	Ret	Ret	16	12	14	14	11	Ret	17	0
31	(Italy) Giacomo Ricci	16	Ret	Ret	11																	0
32	(Serbia) Miloš Pavlović	DNS	12	Ret	16	DNS	DNS															0
33	(Italy) Paolo Maria Nocera	17	Ret																			0
34	(Italy) Marcello Puglisi					17	Ret															0
Pos	Driver	CAT (Spain)		IST (Turkey)		MON (Monaco)		MAG (France)		SIL (United Kingdom)		HOC (Germany)		HUN (Hungary)		VAL (Spain)		SPA (Belgium)		MNZ (Italy)		Points

Key
Colour	Result
Gold	Winner
Silver	2nd place
Bronze	3rd place
Green	Other points position
Blue	Other classified position
Blue	Not classified, finished (NC)
Purple	Not classified, retired (Ret)
Red	Did not qualify (DNQ)
Red	Did not pre-qualify (DNPQ)
Black	Disqualified (DSQ)
White	Did not start (DNS)
White	Race cancelled (C)
Blank	Did not practice (DNP)
Blank	Excluded (EX)
Blank	Did not arrive (DNA)
Blank	Withdrawn (WD)
Text formatting	Meaning
**Bold**	Pole position point(s)
Italics	Fastest lap point(s)

Notes:

- † – Drivers did not finish the race, but were classified as they completed more than 90% of the race distance.

=== Teams' Championship ===
Pos	Team	Car No.	CAT (Spain)		IST (Turkey)		MON (Monaco)		MAG (France)		SIL (United Kingdom)		HOC (Germany)		HUN (Hungary)		VAL (Spain)		SPA (Belgium)		MNZ (Italy)		Points
1	(Spain) Barwa International Campos Team	5	6	Ret	5	2	Ret	15	4	18†	10	5	Ret	11	Ret	9	1	15†	4	3	Ret	Ret	103
1	(Spain) Barwa International Campos Team	6	Ret	9	17	6	16	14	2	4	2	2	5	Ret	1	10	4	1	20†	5	1	11	103
2	(United Kingdom) iSport International	1	9	Ret	4	12	3	Ret	7	Ret	3	Ret	8	1	4	DNS	15†	Ret	10	7	11	Ret	95
2	(United Kingdom) iSport International	2	2	4	15	Ret	1	5	**Ret**	5	**6**	1	4	3	3	3	9	Ret	**11**	Ret	5	8	95
3	(Brazil) Piquet Sports	22	3	Ret	3	Ret	11	17	5	8	7	11	11†	2	2	7	Ret	Ret	DSQ	Ret	Ret	10	92
3	(Brazil) Piquet Sports	23	**12**	Ret	Ret	Ret	**2**	Ret	3	7	Ret	15†	6	17	5	18†	2	Ret	3	1	2	4	92
4	(Spain) Racing Engineering	11	14	6	7	15	14	13	14	10	13	Ret	10†	5	13	6	Ret	5	17	8	Ret	EX	84
4	(Spain) Racing Engineering	12	4	3	**1**	4	Ret	Ret	1	Ret	1	3	**1**	Ret	14	5	**14**†	3	DSQ	EX	10	5	84
5	(France) ART Grand Prix	3	11	Ret	16	14	Ret	12	10	3	8	Ret	12†	NC	10	4	Ret	Ret	18	Ret	Ret	Ret	70
5	(France) ART Grand Prix	4	5	13	2	1	Ret	10	Ret	Ret	5	8	2	4	**17**	12	3	Ret	1	9	4	3	70
6	(Netherlands) Trust Team Arden	14	7	2	6	3	Ret	11	Ret	1	4	DNS	Ret	8	7	1	6	Ret	5	4	3	7	56
6	(Netherlands) Trust Team Arden	15	Ret	10	14	Ret	12	8	12	2	15	10	Ret	Ret	15	Ret	8	13	19	Ret	16	Ret	56
7	(United Kingdom) Super Nova Racing	7	Ret	DNS	19	Ret	10	Ret	13	Ret	12	Ret	7	19	8	2	7	Ret	6	Ret	9	18	47
7	(United Kingdom) Super Nova Racing	8	1	7	Ret	8	5	3	9	Ret	16	Ret	3	6	16	Ret	16†	Ret	2	Ret	Ret	12	47
8	(France) DAMS	9	Ret	15	Ret	Ret	9	7	6	Ret	9	12	Ret	10	9	Ret	5	2	8	2	7	6	31
8	(France) DAMS	10	8	1	Ret	9	Ret	Ret	Ret	9	Ret	7	Ret	18	11	8	Ret	6	9	14	Ret	13	31
9	(Italy) Trident Racing	20	Ret	8	9	5	8†	1	8	6	14	4	Ret	9	6	11	Ret	8	7	Ret	13	Ret	27
9	(Italy) Trident Racing	21	Ret	14	11	Ret	7	2	Ret	14	18	Ret	13†	7	Ret	14	Ret	9	15	10	Ret	9	27
10	(Italy) Fisichella Motor Sport International	18	Ret	Ret	12	13	6	4	Ret	16	11	Ret	18†	15	19	Ret	Ret	10	21†	Ret	6	2	15
10	(Italy) Fisichella Motor Sport International	19	18	11	8	Ret	Ret	Ret	17	11	20	13	14	12	18	Ret	DNS	Ret	16	Ret	15	Ret	15
11	(Italy) Durango	16	10	5	DNS	DNS	17	Ret	Ret	Ret	19	6	Ret	13	Ret	13	NC	7	Ret	6	8	1	11
11	(Italy) Durango	17	13	Ret	18	7	Ret	Ret	18	17	21	9	9	14	DNS	17	Ret	12	Ret	Ret	12	15	11
12	(Spain) BCN Competición	26	17	Ret	10	Ret	4	16	15	12	22	14†	15	Ret	Ret	19	11	Ret	13	13	WD	WD	5
12	(Spain) BCN Competición	27	DNS	12	Ret	16	DNS	DNS	16	13	DNS	Ret	16	16	Ret	Ret	13	11	Ret	12	14	14	5
13	(United Kingdom) DPR	24	16	Ret	Ret	11	13	6	Ret	15	23	DNS	17	Ret	Ret	16	12	14	14	11	Ret	17	4
13	(United Kingdom) DPR	25	15	16	13	10	15	9	11	Ret	17	Ret	Ret	20	12	15	10	4	12	Ret	Ret	16	4
Pos	Team	Car No.	CAT (Spain)		IST (Turkey)		MON (Monaco)		MAG (France)		SIL (United Kingdom)		HOC (Germany)		HUN (Hungary)		VAL (Spain)		SPA (Belgium)		MNZ (Italy)		Points

Key
Colour	Result
Gold	Winner
Silver	2nd place
Bronze	3rd place
Green	Other points position
Blue	Other classified position
Blue	Not classified, finished (NC)
Purple	Not classified, retired (Ret)
Red	Did not qualify (DNQ)
Red	Did not pre-qualify (DNPQ)
Black	Disqualified (DSQ)
White	Did not start (DNS)
White	Race cancelled (C)
Blank	Did not practice (DNP)
Blank	Excluded (EX)
Blank	Did not arrive (DNA)
Blank	Withdrawn (WD)
Text formatting	Meaning
**Bold**	Pole position point(s)
Italics	Fastest lap point(s)

Notes:

- † – Drivers did not finish the race, but were classified as they completed more than 90% of the race distance.
