= 2008 Valencia GP2 Series round =

2008 GP2 race held in Spain

(Spain) 2008 Valencia GP2 round
Round details
- Round 8 of 10 rounds in the 2008 GP2 Series
- Circuit de Valencia
- Location: Valencia Street Circuit, Valencia, Spain
- Course: Street Course; 5.419 km (3.367 mi)

GP2 Series

Feature race
- Date: 23 August 2008
- Laps: 34

Pole position
Driver	(Italy) Giorgio Pantano	Racing Engineering
- Time: 1:45.640

Podium
First	(Russia) Vitaly Petrov	Barwa Int. Campos Team
Second	(Venezuela) Pastor Maldonado	Piquet Sports
Third	(France) Romain Grosjean	ART Grand Prix

Fastest lap
Driver	(Venezuela) Pastor Maldonado	Piquet Sports
- Time: 1:46.880

Sprint race
- Date: 24 August 2008
- Laps: 23

Podium
First	(Brazil) Lucas di Grassi	Barwa Int. Campos Team
Second	(Belgium) Jérôme d'Ambrosio	DAMS
Third	(Italy) Giorgio Pantano	Racing Engineering

Fastest lap
Driver	(Brazil) Lucas di Grassi	Barwa Int. Campos Team
- Time: 1:47.712 (on lap 18)

2008 Valencia GP2 Series round was the Eight round of the 2008 GP2 Series season. It was held on August 23 and 24, 2008 at Valencia Street Circuit at Valencia, Spain. The race was used as a support race to the 2008 European Grand Prix.

== Report ==
=== Feature race ===
"Patrioticheskaya Pesnya", the former Russian national anthem used between 1991 and 2000, was played at the podium ceremony for winner Vitaly Petrov.

== Classification ==
=== Qualifying ===
Pos.	No.	Driver	Team	Time	Grid
1	12	(Italy) Giorgio Pantano	Racing Engineering	1:45.640	1
2	23	(Venezuela) Pastor Maldonado	Piquet Sports	1:45.711	2
3	5	(Russia) Vitaly Petrov	Barwa International Campos Team	1:45.802	3
4	4	(France) Romain Grosjean	ART Grand Prix	1:46.010	4
5	22	(United Arab Emirates) Andreas Zuber	Piquet Sports	1:46.090	5
6	9	(Belgium) Jérôme d'Ambrosio	DAMS	1:46.254	6
7	14	(Switzerland) Sébastien Buemi	Trust Team Arden	1:46.372	7
8	2	(Brazil) Bruno Senna	iSport International	1:46.529	8
9	20	(United Kingdom) Mike Conway	Trident Racing	1:46.592	9
10	15	(Italy) Luca Filippi	Trust Team Arden	1:46.603	10
11	6	(Brazil) Lucas di Grassi	Barwa International Campos Team	1:46.607	11
12	1	(India) Karun Chandhok	iSport International	1:46.657	12
13	8	(Portugal) Álvaro Parente	Super Nova Racing	1:46.763	13
14	11	(Spain) Javier Villa	Racing Engineering	1:46.813	14
15	7	(Spain) Andy Soucek	Super Nova Racing	1:46.949	15
16	26	(Spain) Adrián Vallés	BCN Competición	1:47.102	16
17	18	(Spain) Roldán Rodríguez	FMS International	1:47.269	17
18	3	(Japan) Sakon Yamamoto	ART Grand Prix	1:47.270	18
19	16	(Italy) Davide Valsecchi	Durango	1:47.374	19
20	25	(Brazil) Diego Nunes	David Price Racing	1:47.756	20
21	19	(Estonia) Marko Asmer	FMS International	1:47.854	21
22	21	(China) Ho-Pin Tung	Trident Racing	1:48.030	22
23	17	(Brazil) Alberto Valerio	Durango	1:48.179	23
24	27	(Brazil) Carlos Iaconelli	BCN Competición	1:48.249	24
25	10	(Japan) Kamui Kobayashi	DAMS	1:48.469	25
26	24	(Romania) Michael Herck	David Price Racing	1:48.620	26

=== Feature race ===
Pos.	No.	Driver	Team	Laps	Time/Retired	Grid	Points
1	5	(Russia) Vitaly Petrov	Barwa International Campos Team	34	1:03:25.719	3	10
2	23	(Venezuela) Pastor Maldonado	Piquet Sports	34	+0.868	2	8+1
3	4	(France) Romain Grosjean	ART Grand Prix	34	+4.447	4	6
4	6	(Brazil) Lucas di Grassi	Barwa International Campos Team	34	+28.038	11	5
5	9	(Belgium) Jérôme d'Ambrosio	DAMS	34	+28.736	6	4
6	14	(Switzerland) Sébastien Buemi	Trust Team Arden	34	+28.855	7	3
7	7	(Spain) Andy Soucek	Super Nova Racing	34	+36.960	15	2
8	15	(Italy) Luca Filippi	Trust Team Arden	34	+45.390	10	1
9	2	(Brazil) Bruno Senna	iSport International	34	+48.177	8	
10	25	(Brazil) Diego Nunes	David Price Racing	34	+56.935	20	
11	26	(Spain) Adrián Vallés	BCN Competición	34	+59.149	16	
12	24	(Romania) Michael Herck	David Price Racing	34	+1:03.604	26	
13	27	(Brazil) Carlos Iaconelli	BCN Competición	34	+1:12.716	24	
14	12	(Italy) Giorgio Pantano	Racing Engineering	33	Out of fuel	1	2
15	1	(India) Karun Chandhok	iSport International	33	+1 lap	12	
16	8	(Portugal) Álvaro Parente	Super Nova Racing	32	+2 laps	13	
NC	16	(Italy) Davide Valsecchi	Durango	29	+5 laps	19	
Ret	22	(United Arab Emirates) Andreas Zuber	Piquet Sports	24	Crash	5	
Ret	3	(Japan) Sakon Yamamoto	ART Grand Prix	9	Failure	18	
Ret	20	(United Kingdom) Mike Conway	Trident Racing	1	Crash	9	
Ret	11	(Spain) Javier Villa	Racing Engineering	0	Crash	14	
Ret	18	(Spain) Roldán Rodríguez	FMS International	0	Crash	17	
Ret	21	(China) Ho-Pin Tung	Trident Racing	0	Crash	22	
Ret	17	(Brazil) Alberto Valerio	Durango	0	Crash	23	
Ret	10	(Japan) Kamui Kobayashi	DAMS	0	Crash	25	
DNS	19	(Estonia) Marko Asmer	FMS International	0	Did not start	21	

=== Sprint race ===
Pos.	No.	Driver	Team	Laps	Time/Retired	Grid	Points
1	6	(Brazil) Lucas di Grassi	Barwa International Campos Team	23	43:01.131	5	6+1
2	9	(Belgium) Jérôme d'Ambrosio	DAMS	23	+6.456	4	5
3	12	(Italy) Giorgio Pantano	Racing Engineering	23	+7.545	14	4
4	25	(Brazil) Diego Nunes	David Price Racing	23	+12.039	10	3
5	11	(Spain) Javier Villa	Racing Engineering	23	+12.674	21	2
6	10	(Japan) Kamui Kobayashi	DAMS	23	+13.201	25	1
7	16	(Italy) Davide Valsecchi	Durango	23	+15.394	17	
8	20	(United Kingdom) Mike Conway	Trident Racing	23	+17.496	20	
9	21	(China) Ho-Pin Tung	Trident Racing	23	+20.072	23	
10	18	(Spain) Roldán Rodríguez	FMS International	23	+22.960	22	
11	27	(Brazil) Carlos Iaconelli	BCN Competición	23	+24.716	13	
12	17	(Brazil) Alberto Valerio	Durango	23	+25.933	24	
13	15	(Italy) Luca Filippi	Trust Team Arden	23	+29.213^{1}	1	
14	24	(Romania) Michael Herck	David Price Racing	22	+1 lap	12	
15	5	(Russia) Vitaly Petrov	Barwa International Campos Team	20	+3 laps	8	
Ret	1	(India) Karun Chandhok	iSport International	18	Crash	15	
Ret	19	(Estonia) Marko Asmer	FMS International	12	Crash	26	
Ret	4	(France) Romain Grosjean	ART Grand Prix	11	Crash	6	
Ret	7	(Spain) Andy Soucek	Super Nova Racing	7	Crash	2	
Ret	2	(Brazil) Bruno Senna	iSport International	7	Crash	9	
Ret	3	(Japan) Sakon Yamamoto	ART Grand Prix	4	Collision	19	
Ret	26	(Spain) Adrián Vallés	BCN Competición	3	Collision	11	
Ret	14	(Switzerland) Sébastien Buemi	Trust Team Arden	3	Collision	3	
Ret	23	(Venezuela) Pastor Maldonado	Piquet Sports	2	Crash	7	
Ret	8	(Portugal) Álvaro Parente	Super Nova Racing	0	Crash	16	
Ret	22	(United Arab Emirates) Andreas Zuber	Piquet Sports	0	Crash	18	

Notes

- ^1 – Luca Filippi finished 2nd, but was penalized with a drive-through (which became a 25-second penalty) because of the collision with Romain Grosjean.

Previous round: 2008 Hungaroring GP2 Series round	GP2 Series; 2008 season	Next round: 2008 Spa-Francorchamps GP2 Series round
Previous round: 2007 Valencia GP2 Series round	Valencian GP2 round	Next round: 2009 Valencia GP2 Series round
