= 2008 Magny-Cours GP2 Series round =

(France) 2008 Magny-Cours GP2 round
Round details
- Round 4 of 10 rounds in the 2008 GP2 Series
- Location: Magny-Cours, France
- Course: Permanent racing facility 4.411 km (2.74 mi)

GP2 Series

Feature race
- Date: 21 June 2008
- Laps: 41

Pole position
Driver	(Brazil) Bruno Senna	iSport International
- Time: 1:22.250

Podium
First	(Italy) Giorgio Pantano	Racing Engineering
Second	(Brazil) Lucas di Grassi	Barwa Int. Campos Team
Third	(Venezuela) Pastor Maldonado	Piquet Sports

Fastest lap
Driver	(Italy) Giorgio Pantano	Racing Engineering
- Time: 1:25.352 (on lap 24)

Sprint race
- Date: 22 June 2008
- Laps: 28

Podium
First	(Switzerland) Sébastien Buemi	Trust Team Arden
Second	(Netherlands) Yelmer Buurman	Trust Team Arden
Third	(Italy) Luca Filippi	ART Grand Prix

Fastest lap
Driver	(Japan) Kamui Kobayashi	DAMS
- Time: 1:23.550 (on lap 28)

2008 Magny-Cours GP2 Series round was a GP2 Series motor race held on June 21 and June 22, 2008 at the Circuit de Nevers Magny-Cours in Magny-Cours, France. It was the fourth race of the 2008 GP2 Series season. The race was used to support the 2008 French Grand Prix.

== Classification ==
=== Qualifying ===
Pos.	No.	Driver	Team	Time	Grid
1	2	(Brazil) Bruno Senna	iSport International	1:22.250	1
2	4	(France) Romain Grosjean	ART Grand Prix	1:22.287	2
3	12	(Italy) Giorgio Pantano	Racing Engineering	1:22.301	3
4	22	(United Arab Emirates) Andreas Zuber	Piquet Sports	1:22.380	4
5	14	(Switzerland) Sébastien Buemi	Trust Team Arden	1:22.619	9
6	6	(Brazil) Lucas di Grassi	Barwa International Campos Team	1:22.708	5
7	10	(Japan) Kamui Kobayashi	DAMS	1:22.726	11
8	5	(Russia) Vitaly Petrov	Barwa International Campos Team	1:22.774	6
9	23	(Venezuela) Pastor Maldonado	Piquet Sports	1:22.780	7
10	1	(India) Karun Chandhok	iSport International	1:22.821	8
11	3	(Italy) Luca Filippi	ART Grand Prix	1:22.956	10
12	7	(Spain) Andy Soucek	Super Nova Racing	1:23.035	12
13	9	(Belgium) Jérôme d'Ambrosio	DAMS	1:23.094	13
14	20	(United Kingdom) Mike Conway	Trident Racing	1:23.154	14
15	25	(Brazil) Diego Nunes	David Price Racing	1:23.158	15
16	16	(United Kingdom) Ben Hanley	Durango	1:23.191	16
17	21	(China) Ho-Pin Tung	Trident Racing	1:23.331	17
18	26	(Spain) Adrián Vallés	BCN Competición	1:23.372	18
19	15	(Netherlands) Yelmer Buurman	Trust Team Arden	1:23.441	19
20	18	(Spain) Roldán Rodríguez	FMS International	1:23.467	20
21	8	(Portugal) Álvaro Parente	Super Nova Racing	1:23.787	26
22	17	(Brazil) Alberto Valerio	Durango	1:23.853	21
23	19	(Estonia) Marko Asmer	FMS International	1:23.870	22
24	11	(Spain) Javier Villa	Racing Engineering	1:23.998	23
25	27	(Brazil) Carlos Iaconelli	BCN Competición	1:24.784	24
26	24	(Romania) Michael Herck	David Price Racing	1:25.668	25

=== Feature race ===
Pos.	No.	Driver	Team	Laps	Time/Retired	Grid	Points
1	12	(Italy) Giorgio Pantano	Racing Engineering	41	59:17.927	3	10+1
2	6	(Brazil) Lucas di Grassi	Barwa International Campos Team	41	+8.607	5	8
3	23	(Venezuela) Pastor Maldonado	Piquet Sports	41	+12.436	7	6
4	5	(Russia) Vitaly Petrov	Barwa International Campos Team	41	+17.081	6	5
5	22	(United Arab Emirates) Andreas Zuber	Piquet Sports	41	+17.485	4	4
6	9	(Belgium) Jérôme d'Ambrosio	DAMS	41	+18.492	13	3
7	1	(India) Karun Chandhok	iSport International	41	+20.330	8	2
8	20	(United Kingdom) Mike Conway	Trident Racing	41	+23.028	14	1
9	8	(Portugal) Álvaro Parente	Super Nova Racing	41	+28.848	26	
10	3	(Italy) Luca Filippi	ART Grand Prix	41	+41.255	10	
11	25	(Brazil) Diego Nunes	David Price Racing	41	+54.160	15	
12	15	(Netherlands) Yelmer Buurman	Trust Team Arden	41	+57.581	19	
13	7	(Spain) Andy Soucek	Super Nova Racing	41	+57.817	12	
14	11	(Spain) Javier Villa	Racing Engineering	41	+58.529	23	
15	26	(Spain) Adrián Vallés	BCN Competición	41	+1:01.455	18	
16	27	(Brazil) Carlos Iaconelli	BCN Competición	41	+1:20.438	24	
17	19	(Estonia) Marko Asmer	FMS International	41	+1:21.042	22	
18	17	(Brazil) Alberto Valerio	Durango	39	+2 laps	21	
Ret	4	(France) Romain Grosjean	ART Grand Prix	34	Retired	2	
Ret	18	(Spain) Roldán Rodríguez	FMS International	33	Retired	20	
Ret	14	(Switzerland) Sébastien Buemi	Trust Team Arden	28	Retired	9	
Ret	16	(United Kingdom) Ben Hanley	Durango	24	Retired	16	
Ret	2	(Brazil) Bruno Senna	iSport International	22	Retired	1	2
Ret	24	(Romania) Michael Herck	David Price Racing	16	Spun off	25	
Ret	21	(China) Ho-Pin Tung	Trident Racing	14	Spun off	17	
Ret	10	(Japan) Kamui Kobayashi	DAMS	0	Collision damage	11	

=== Sprint race ===
Pos.	No.	Driver	Team	Laps	Time/Retired	Grid	Points
1	14	(Switzerland) Sébastien Buemi	Trust Team Arden	28	43:08.504	21	6
2	15	(Netherlands) Yelmer Buurman	Trust Team Arden	28	+6.639	12	5
3	3	(Italy) Luca Filippi	ART Grand Prix	28	+23.953	10	4
4	6	(Brazil) Lucas di Grassi	Barwa International Campos Team	28	+24.479	7	3
5	2	(Brazil) Bruno Senna	iSport International	28	+29.439	23	2
6	20	(United Kingdom) Mike Conway	Trident Racing	28	+35.924	1	1
7	23	(Venezuela) Pastor Maldonado	Piquet Sports	28	+38.074	6	
8	22	(United Arab Emirates) Andreas Zuber	Piquet Sports	28	+43.060	4	
9	10	(Japan) Kamui Kobayashi	DAMS	28	+45.558	26	
10	11	(Spain) Javier Villa	Racing Engineering	28	+46.756	14	
11	19	(Estonia) Marko Asmer	FMS International	28	+52.901	17	
12	26	(Spain) Adrián Vallés	BCN Competición	27	+1 lap	15	
13	27	(Brazil) Carlos Iaconelli	BCN Competición	27	+1 lap	16	
14	21	(China) Ho-Pin Tung	Trident Racing	26	+2 laps	25	
15	24	(Romania) Michael Herck	David Price Racing	26	+2 laps	24	
16	18	(Spain) Roldán Rodríguez	FMS International	26	+2 laps	20	
17	17	(Brazil) Alberto Valerio	Durango	26	+2 laps	18	
18	5	(Russia) Vitaly Petrov	Barwa International Campos Team	25	+3 laps	5	
Ret	8	(Portugal) Álvaro Parente	Super Nova Racing	24	Spun off	9	
Ret	16	(United Kingdom) Ben Hanley	Durango	24	Spun off	22	
Ret	25	(Brazil) Diego Nunes	David Price Racing	21	Spun off	11	
Ret	12	(Italy) Giorgio Pantano	Racing Engineering	14	Spun off	8	
Ret	1	(India) Karun Chandhok	iSport International	13	Spun off	2	
Ret	4	(France) Romain Grosjean	ART Grand Prix	6	Spun off	19	
Ret	7	(Spain) Andy Soucek	Super Nova Racing	2	Spun off	13	
Ret	9	(Belgium) Jérôme d'Ambrosio	DAMS	2	Spun off	3	

Previous round: 2008 Monaco GP2 Series round	GP2 Series; 2008 season	Next round: 2008 Silverstone GP2 Series round
Previous round: 2007 Magny-Cours GP2 Series round	Magny-Cours GP2 round	Next round: none
