= 2008 Catalunya GP2 Series round =

2008 GP2 race held in Spain

(Spain) 2008 Spanish GP2 round
Round details
- Round 1 of 10 rounds in the 2008 GP2 Series
- Location: Circuit de Catalunya, Montmeló, Catalonia, Spain
- Course: Permanent racing facility 4.627 km (2.875 mi)

GP2 Series

Feature race
- Date: 26 April 2008
- Laps: 38

Pole position
Driver	(Venezuela) Pastor Maldonado	Piquet Sports
- Time: 1:27.547

Podium
First	(Portugal) Álvaro Parente	Super Nova Racing
Second	(Brazil) Bruno Senna	iSport International
Third	(United Arab Emirates) Andreas Zuber	Piquet Sports

Fastest lap
Driver	(Portugal) Álvaro Parente	Super Nova Racing
- Time: 1:30.548 (on lap 10)

Sprint race
- Date: 27 April 2008
- Laps: 26

Podium
First	(Japan) Kamui Kobayashi	DAMS
Second	(Switzerland) Sébastien Buemi	Trust Team Arden
Third	(Italy) Giorgio Pantano	Racing Engineering

Fastest lap
Driver	(Japan) Kamui Kobayashi	DAMS
- Time: 1:30.045 (on lap 5)

The 2008 Spanish GP2 round was a GP2 Series motor race held on 26 April and 27 April 2008 at the Circuit de Catalunya in Montmeló, Catalonia, Spain. It was the first race of the 2008 GP2 Series season. The race was used to support the 2008 Spanish Grand Prix.

== Classification ==
=== Qualifying ===
Pos.	No.	Driver	Team	Time	Grid
1	23	(Venezuela) Pastor Maldonado	Piquet Sports	1:27.547	1
2	8	(Portugal) Álvaro Parente	Super Nova Racing	1:27.705	2
3	22	(United Arab Emirates) Andreas Zuber	Piquet Sports	1:28.155	3
4	2	(Brazil) Bruno Senna	iSport International	1:28.273	4
5	12	(Italy) Giorgio Pantano	Racing Engineering	1:28.290	5
6	19	(Spain) Adrián Vallés	FMS International	1:28.323	6
7	1	(India) Karun Chandhok	iSport International	1:28.385	7
8	5	(Russia) Vitaly Petrov	Barwa International Campos Team	1:28.423	8
9	11	(Spain) Javier Villa	Racing Engineering	1:28.562	9
10	20	(United Kingdom) Mike Conway	Trident Racing	1:28.622	10
11	4	(France) Romain Grosjean	ART Grand Prix	1:28.684	11
12	16	(Italy) Davide Valsecchi	Durango	1:28.713	12
13	10	(Japan) Kamui Kobayashi	DAMS	1:28.799	13
14	3	(Italy) Luca Filippi	ART Grand Prix	1:28.868	14
15	6	(United Kingdom) Ben Hanley	Barwa International Campos Team	1:28.889	15
16	21	(China) Ho-Pin Tung	Trident Racing	1:28.937	16
17	17	(Brazil) Alberto Valerio	Durango	1:29.338	17
18	15	(Netherlands) Yelmer Buurman	Trust Team Arden	1:29.339	18
19	7	(Denmark) Christian Bakkerud	Super Nova Racing	1:29.394	19
20	14	(Switzerland) Sébastien Buemi	Trust Team Arden	1:29.478	20
21	27	(Serbia) Miloš Pavlović	BCN Competición	1:29 618	21
22	9	(Belgium) Jérôme d'Ambrosio	DAMS	1:29.628	22
23	26	(Italy) Paolo Nocera	BCN Competición	1:29.708	23
24	18	(Spain) Roldán Rodríguez	FMS International	1:29.762	24
25	25	(Brazil) Diego Nunes	David Price Racing	1:30.343	25
26	24	(Italy) Giacomo Ricci	David Price Racing	1:30.443	26

=== Feature race ===
Pos.	No.	Driver	Team	Laps	Time/Retired	Grid	Points
1	8	(Portugal) Álvaro Parente	Super Nova Racing	38	1:01:09.902	2	10+1
2	2	(Brazil) Bruno Senna	iSport International	38	+0.579	4	8
3	22	(United Arab Emirates) Andreas Zuber	Piquet Sports	38	+1.511	3	6
4	12	(Italy) Giorgio Pantano	Racing Engineering	38	+3.768	5	5
5	4	(France) Romain Grosjean	ART Grand Prix	38	+8.155	11	4
6	5	(Russia) Vitaly Petrov	Barwa International Campos Team	38	+19.729	8	3
7	14	(Switzerland) Sébastien Buemi	Trust Team Arden	38	+27.326	20	2
8	10	(Japan) Kamui Kobayashi	DAMS	38	+27.945	13	1
9	1	(India) Karun Chandhok	iSport International	38	+30.394	7	
10	16	(Italy) Davide Valsecchi	Durango	38	+34.573	12	
11	3	(Italy) Luca Filippi	ART Grand Prix	38	+34.816	14	
12	23	(Venezuela) Pastor Maldonado	Piquet Sports	38	+38.600	1	2
13	17	(Brazil) Alberto Valerio	Durango	38	+42.489	17	
14	11	(Spain) Javier Villa	Racing Engineering	38	+43.200	9	
15	25	(Brazil) Diego Nunes	David Price Racing	38	+1:09.867	25	
16	24	(Italy) Giacomo Ricci	David Price Racing	38	+1:10.152	26	
17	26	(Italy) Paolo Nocera	BCN Competición	38	+1:28.749	23	
18	19	(Spain) Adrián Vallés	FMS International	38	+1:28.778	6	
Ret	7	(Denmark) Christian Bakkerud	Super Nova Racing	20	accident	19	
Ret	15	(Netherlands) Yelmer Buurman	Trust Team Arden	18	Accident	18	
Ret	6	(United Kingdom) Ben Hanley	Barwa International Campos Team	15	Accident	15	
Ret	9	(Belgium) Jérôme d'Ambrosio	DAMS	15	Accident	22	
Ret	18	(Spain) Roldán Rodríguez	FMS International	4	Collision damage	24	
Ret	21	(China) Ho-Pin Tung	Trident Racing	1	Collision	16	
Ret	20	(United Kingdom) Mike Conway	Trident Racing	0	Accident	10	
DNS	27	(Serbia) Miloš Pavlović	BCN Competición	0	Did not start	21	

=== Sprint race ===
Pos.	No.	Driver	Team	Laps	Time/Retired	Grid	Points
1	10	(Japan) Kamui Kobayashi	DAMS	26	40:27.229	1	6+1
2	14	(Switzerland) Sébastien Buemi	Trust Team Arden	26	+1.176	2	5
3	12	(Italy) Giorgio Pantano	Racing Engineering	26	+1.962	5	4
4	2	(Brazil) Bruno Senna	iSport International	26	+2.808	7	3
5	16	(Italy) Davide Valsecchi	Durango	26	+3.501	10	2
6	11	(Spain) Javier Villa	Racing Engineering	26	+8.480	14	1
7	8	(Portugal) Álvaro Parente	Super Nova Racing	26	+8.573	8	
8	20	(United Kingdom) Mike Conway	Trident Racing	26	+9.593	25	
9	6	(United Kingdom) Ben Hanley	Barwa International Campos Team	26	+11.469	21	
10	15	(Netherlands) Yelmer Buurman	Trust Team Arden	26	+16.974	20	
11	19	(Spain) Adrián Vallés	FMS International	26	+22.871	18	
12	27	(Serbia) Miloš Pavlović	BCN Competición	26	+23.360	26	
13	4	(France) Romain Grosjean	ART Grand Prix	26	+23.558	4	
14	21	(China) Ho-Pin Tung	Trident Racing	26	+25.486	24	
15	9	(Belgium) Jérôme d'Ambrosio	DAMS	26	+47.929	22	
16	25	(Brazil) Diego Nunes	David Price Racing	25	+1 lap	15	
Ret	23	(Venezuela) Pastor Maldonado	Piquet Sports	22	Collision	12	
Ret	22	(United Arab Emirates) Andreas Zuber	Piquet Sports	22	Collision	6	
Ret	1	(India) Karun Chandhok	iSport International	18	Collision	9	
Ret	24	(Italy) Giacomo Ricci	David Price Racing	18	Collision	16	
Ret	5	(Russia) Vitaly Petrov	Barwa International Campos Team	15	Crash	3	
Ret	17	(Brazil) Alberto Valerio	Durango	14	Crash	13	
Ret	18	(Spain) Roldán Rodríguez	FMS International	13	Crash	23	
Ret	26	(Italy) Paolo Nocera	BCN Competición	12	Crash	17	
Ret	3	(Italy) Luca Filippi	ART Grand Prix	3	Crash	11	
DNS	7	(Denmark) Christian Bakkerud	Super Nova Racing	0	Did not start	19	

Previous round: 2007 Valencia GP2 Series round	GP2 Series; 2008 season	Next round: 2008 Istanbul Park GP2 Series round
Previous round: 2007 Catalunya GP2 Series round	Catalunya GP2 round	Next round: 2009 Catalunya GP2 Series round
