= 2008 Istanbul Park GP2 Series round =

(Turkey) 2008 Istanbul Park GP2 round
Round details
- Round 2 of 10 rounds in the 2008 GP2 Series
- Istanbul Park
- Location: Istanbul Park, Istanbul, Turkey
- Course: Permanent racing facility 5.338 km (3.317 mi)

GP2 Series

Feature race
- Date: 10 May 2008
- Laps: 34

Pole position
Driver	(Italy) Giorgio Pantano	Racing Engineering
- Time: 1:32.659

Podium
First	(Italy) Giorgio Pantano	Racing Engineering
Second	(France) Romain Grosjean	ART Grand Prix
Third	(United Arab Emirates) Andreas Zuber	Piquet Sports

Fastest lap
Driver	(United Arab Emirates) Andreas Zuber	Piquet Sports
- Time: 1:33.482 (on lap 33)

Sprint race
- Date: 11 May 2008
- Laps: 23

Podium
First	(France) Romain Grosjean	ART Grand Prix
Second	(Russia) Vitaly Petrov	Barwa Int. Campos Team
Third	(Switzerland) Sébastien Buemi	Trust Team Arden

Fastest lap
Driver	(France) Romain Grosjean	ART Grand Prix
- Time: 1:33.767 (on lap 17)

The 2008 Istanbul Park GP2 Series round was a GP2 Series motor race held on May 10 and 11, 2008 at Istanbul Park in Istanbul, Turkey. It was the second round of the 2008 GP2 Series season. The race weekend supported the 2008 Turkish Grand Prix.

== Classification ==
=== Qualifying ===
Pos.	No.	Driver	Team	Time	Grid
1	12	(Italy) Giorgio Pantano	Racing Engineering	1:32.659	1
2	22	(United Arab Emirates) Andreas Zuber	Piquet Sports	1:32.913	2
3	19	(United Kingdom) Adam Carroll	FMS International	1:33.141	3
4	4	(France) Romain Grosjean	ART Grand Prix	1:33.248	4
5	2	(Brazil) Bruno Senna	iSport International	1:33.449	5
6	23	(Venezuela) Pastor Maldonado	Piquet Sports	1:33.451	6
7	1	(India) Karun Chandhok	iSport International	1:33.703	7
8	11	(Spain) Javier Villa	Racing Engineering	1:33.813	8
9	16	(Italy) Davide Valsecchi	Durango	1:33.841	9
10	5	(Russia) Vitaly Petrov	Barwa International Campos Team	1:33.896	10
11	9	(Belgium) Jérôme d'Ambrosio	DAMS	1:33.948	11
12	6	(United Kingdom) Ben Hanley	Barwa International Campos Team	1:33.957	21
13	26	(Spain) Adrián Vallés	BCN Competición	1:34.006	12
14	7	(Spain) Andy Soucek	Super Nova Racing	1:34.064	18
15	20	(United Kingdom) Mike Conway	Trident Racing	1:34.170	19
16	14	(Switzerland) Sébastien Buemi	Trust Team Arden	1:34.173	13
17	15	(Netherlands) Yelmer Buurman	Trust Team Arden	1:34.186	14
18	3	(Italy) Luca Filippi	ART Grand Prix	1:34.366	15
19	21	(China) Ho-Pin Tung	Trident Racing	1:34.506	16
20	25	(Brazil) Diego Nunes	DPR	1:34.617	24
21	8	(Portugal) Álvaro Parente	Super Nova Racing	1:34.620	17
22	10	(Japan) Kamui Kobayashi	DAMS	1:34.667	23
23	17	(Brazil) Alberto Valerio	Durango	1:34.678	26
24	18	(Spain) Roldán Rodríguez	FMS International	1:34.698	20
25	27	(Serbia) Miloš Pavlović	BCN Competición	1:35.398	25
26	24	(Italy) Giacomo Ricci	DPR	1:35.878	22

=== Feature race ===
Pos.	No.	Driver	Team	Laps	Time/Retired	Grid	Points
1	12	(Italy) Giorgio Pantano	Racing Engineering	34	56:51.163	1	12
2	4	(France) Romain Grosjean	ART Grand Prix	34	+1.792	4	8
3	22	(United Arab Emirates) Andreas Zuber	Piquet Sports	34	+2.252	2	7
4	1	(India) Karun Chandhok	iSport International	34	+11.321	7	5
5	5	(Russia) Vitaly Petrov	Barwa International Campos Team	34	+12.474	10	4
6	14	(Switzerland) Sébastien Buemi	Trust Team Arden	34	+13.773	13	3
7	11	(Spain) Javier Villa	Racing Engineering	34	+14.894	8	2
8	19	(United Kingdom) Adam Carroll	FMS International	34	+16.675	3	1
9	20	(United Kingdom) Mike Conway	Trident Racing	34	+17.743	19	
10	26	(Spain) Adrián Vallés	BCN Competición	34	+19.012	12	
11	21	(China) Ho-Pin Tung	Trident Racing	34	+20.346	16	
12	18	(Spain) Roldán Rodríguez	FMS International	34	+21.238	20	
13	25	(Brazil) Diego Nunes	DPR	34	+22.507	24	
14	15	(Netherlands) Yelmer Buurman	Trust Team Arden	34	+23.294	14	
15	2	(Brazil) Bruno Senna	iSport International	34	+23.765	5	
16	3	(Italy) Luca Filippi	ART Grand Prix	33	+1 Lap	15	
17	6	(United Kingdom) Ben Hanley	Barwa International Campos Team	33	+1 Lap	21	
18	17	(Brazil) Alberto Valerio	Durango	32	+2 Laps	26	
19	7	(Spain) Andy Soucek	Super Nova Racing	31	+3 Laps	18	
Ret	9	(Belgium) Jérôme d'Ambrosio	DAMS	29	Spins	11	
Ret	23	(Venezuela) Pastor Maldonado	Piquet Sports	19	Spins	6	
Ret	27	(Serbia) Miloš Pavlović	BCN Competición	16	Spins	25	
Ret	24	(Italy) Giacomo Ricci	DPR	8	Spins	22	
Ret	8	(Portugal) Álvaro Parente	Super Nova Racing	7	Collision	17	
Ret	10	(Japan) Kamui Kobayashi	DAMS	1	Collision	23	
DNS	16	(Italy) Davide Valsecchi	Durango	0	Crash Qualifying	9	

=== Sprint race ===
Pos.	No.	Driver	Team	Laps	Time/Retired	Grid	Points
1	4	(France) Romain Grosjean	ART Grand Prix	23	41:53.377	7	7
2	5	(Russia) Vitaly Petrov	Barwa International Campos Team	23	+8.019	4	5
3	14	(Switzerland) Sébastien Buemi	Trust Team Arden	23	+8.447	3	4
4	12	(Italy) Giorgio Pantano	Racing Engineering	23	+9.897	8	3
5	20	(United Kingdom) Mike Conway	Trident Racing	23	+11.508	9	2
6	6	(United Kingdom) Ben Hanley	Barwa International Campos Team	23	+12.847	17	1
7	17	(Brazil) Alberto Valerio	Durango	23	+14.150	18	
8	8	(Portugal) Álvaro Parente	Super Nova Racing	23	+16.329	24	
9	10	(Japan) Kamui Kobayashi	DAMS	23	+17.533	25	
10	25	(Brazil) Diego Nunes	DPR	23	+24.392	13	
11	24	(Italy) Giacomo Ricci	DPR	23	+24.850	23	
12	1	(India) Karun Chandhok	iSport International	23	+25.743	5	
13	18	(Spain) Roldán Rodríguez	FMS International	23	+26.094	12	
14	3	(Italy) Luca Filippi	ART Grand Prix	23	+26.450	16	
15	11	(Spain) Javier Villa	Racing Engineering	23	+27.449	2	
16	27	(Serbia) Miloš Pavlović	BCN Competición	23	+1:24.304	22	
Ret	2	(Brazil) Bruno Senna	iSport International	11	Crash	15	
Ret	19	(United Kingdom) Adam Carroll	FMS International	0	Collision	1	
Ret	22	(United Arab Emirates) Andreas Zuber	Piquet Sports	0	Collision	6	
Ret	26	(Spain) Adrián Vallés	BCN Competición	0	Collision	10	
Ret	21	(China) Ho-Pin Tung	Trident Racing	0	Collision	11	
Ret	15	(Netherlands) Yelmer Buurman	Trust Team Arden	0	Collision	14	
Ret	7	(Spain) Andy Soucek	Super Nova Racing	0	Collision	19	
Ret	9	(Belgium) Jérôme d'Ambrosio	DAMS	0	Collision	20	
Ret	23	(Venezuela) Pastor Maldonado	Piquet Sports	0	Collision	21	
DNS	16	(Italy) Davide Valsecchi	Durango	0	Injured		

Previous round: 2008 Catalunya GP2 Series round	GP2 Series; 2008 season	Next round: 2008 Monaco GP2 Series round
Previous round: 2007 Istanbul Park GP2 Series round	Istanbul Park GP2 round	Next round: 2009 Istanbul Park GP2 Series round
