= Carlos Iaconelli =

Brazilian racing driver (born 1987)

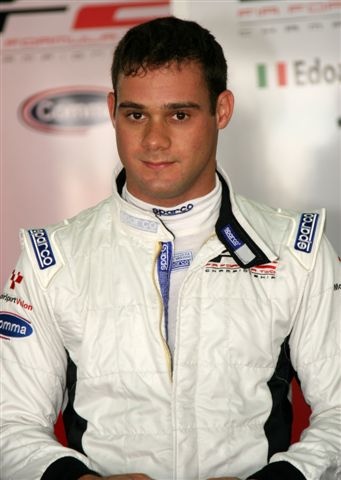
- Iaconelli in 2009
- Nationality: (Brazil) Brazilian
- Born: June 26, 1987 (age 39)

FIA Formula Two Championship career
- Debut season: 2009
- Current team: MotorSport Vision
- Car number: 17
- Starts: 14
- Wins: 0
- Poles: 0
- Fastest laps: 0
- Best finish: 11th in 2009

Previous series
- 2010 2008–09 2008 2008 2008 2005–07 2005 2005 2005–06 2004 2003–04: Auto GP; GP2 Asia Series; GP2 Series; International Formula Master; Formula Master Italia; Formula Renault 3.5 Series; Eurocup Formula Renault 2.0; Formula Renault 2.0 Italia; Spanish Formula Three; Formula Three Sudamericana; Brazilian Formula Renault

Carlos "Iaco" Iaconelli (born June 26, 1987) is a Brazilian former racing car driver.

== Career ==
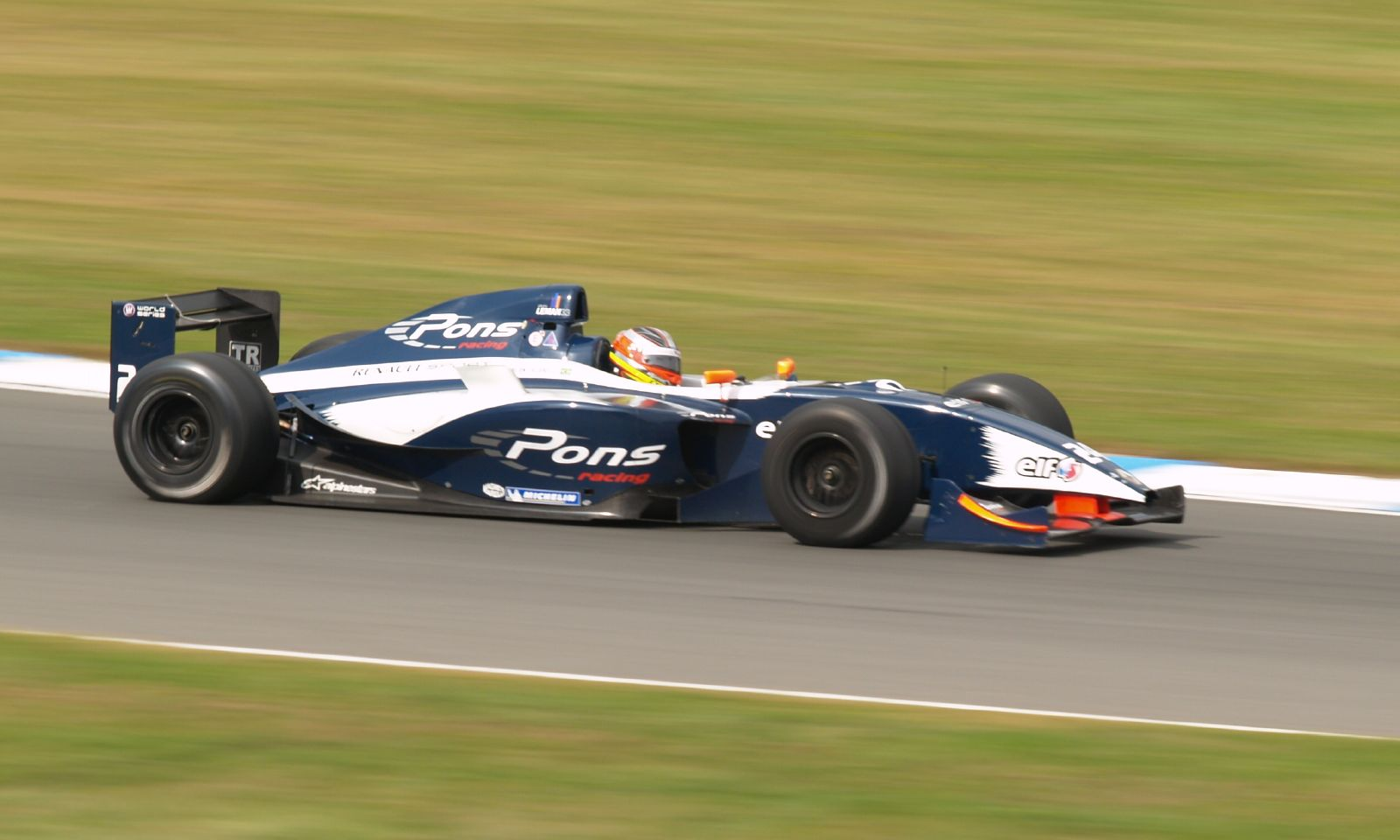
Iaconelli driving for Pons Racing in the Donington Park round of the 2007 Formula Renault 3.5 Series season.

Iaconelli spent much of his early career in karting before moving into single-seaters in 2004, where he competed in both Brazilian Formula Renault and the South American Formula Three championship. In 2005, he contested six races in the Spanish Formula Three Championship, finishing the season 20th overall. Iaconelli also contested a handful of races in Italian Formula Renault and the Eurocup Formula Renault series as well as making his debut in the Formula Renault 3.5 Series for the Austrian team Interwetten.com.

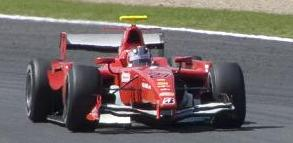
Iaconelli driving for BCN Competicion at the Magny-Cours round of the 2008 GP2 Series season.

For 2006, Iaconelli raced in the Formula Renault 3.5 Series for three different teams - Eurointernational, Comtec Racing and GD Racing, taking part in twelve races but scoring no championship points. He also contested five races in the Spanish Formula Three Championship.

For the 2007 season, Iaconelli originally joined Interwetten.com for FR3.5, only to be replaced by Russian Daniil Move a month before the first race of the season. He did, however, sign for Pons Racing a few days later.

In 2008, Iaconelli raced in the International Formula Master series. He also made his GP2 Series début mid-season, driving for the BCN Competicion team. He moved to the Durango team for the 2008–09 GP2 Asia Series season, but was replaced by Michael Dalle Stelle following the first round of the championship.

2009 saw Iaconelli move to the FIA Formula Two Championship, driving car number seventeen. Despite missing the final round at Circuit de Catalunya due to flu, Iaconelli wrapped up eleventh place in the standings, with his best result of second also coming in Spain, in Valencia.

== Racing record ==
=== Career summary ===
Season	Series	Team	Races	Wins	Podiums	Poles	F.Laps	Points	Position
2003	Formula Renault 2.0 Brazil	Medina-M4T Motorsport	1	0	0	0	0	0	NC
2004	Formula Renault 2.0 Brazil	PropCar Racing	14	2	4	1	0	183	4th
2004	Formula 3 Sudamericana	PropCar Racing	17	0	3	0	1	59	5th
2005	Formula Renault 3.5 Series	Interwetten Racing	2	0	0	0	0	0	NC
2005	Eurocup Formula Renault 2.0	JD Motorsport	4	0	0	0	0	0	NC
2005	Formula Renault 2.0 Italia	JD Motorsport	4	0	0	0	0	0	NC
2005	Spanish Formula Three Championship	GTA Motor Competición	6	0	0	0	0	2	20th
2006	Formula Renault 3.5 Series	Interwetten Racing	12	0	0	0	0	0	NC
2006	Spanish Formula Three Championship	Elide Racing	5	0	1	0	0	23	12th
2006	Renault Super Clio Cup Brazil	NCT Pailoli Racing	2	0	0	0	0	8	17th
2007	Formula Renault 3.5 Series	Pons Racing	17	0	0	0	0	13	21st
2008	GP2 Series	BCN Competición	13	0	0	0	0	0	NC
2008	International Formula Master	Pro Motorsport	4	0	0	0	0	0	NC
2008	Formula Master Italia	Pro Motorsport	2	0	0	1	0	1	19th
2008-09	GP2 Asia Series	Durango	2	0	0	0	0	0	NC
2009	FIA Formula Two Championship		14	0	1	0	0	21	11th
2010	Auto GP	Durango	12	3	3	0	1	24	7th
2011	NASCAR K&N Pro Series West	X-Team Racing	1	0	0	0	0	127	80th
2011	FIA GT3 European Championship	Scuderia Vittoria	2	0	0	0	0	4	35th
2011	Blancpain Endurance Series	Scuderia Vittoria	4	0	1	0	0	33	15th
2012	NASCAR K&N Pro Series West	X-Team Racing	1	0	0	0	0	38	54th
2012	NASCAR K&N Pro Series East	X-Team Racing	8	0	0	0	0	179	22nd

=== Complete Eurocup Formula Renault 2.0 results ===
(key) (Races in bold indicate pole position; races in italics indicate fastest lap)

Year	Entrant	1	2	3	4	5	6	7	8	9	10	11	12	13	14	15	16	DC	Points
2005	JD Motorsport	ZOL; 1 Ret	ZOL; 2 Ret	VAL; 1; 17	VAL; 2; 15	LMS; 1	LMS; 2	BIL; 1	BIL; 2	OSC; 1	OSC; 2	DON; 1	DON; 2	EST; 1	EST; 2	MNZ; 1	MNZ; 2	40th	0

=== Complete Formula Renault 3.5 Series results ===
(key)

Year	Entrant	1	2	3	4	5	6	7	8	9	10	11	12	13	14	15	16	17	DC	Points
2005	Interwetten.com	ZOL; 1	ZOL; 2	MON; 1	VAL; 1	VAL; 2	LMS; 1	LMS; 2	BIL; 1	BIL; 2	OSC; 1	OSC; 2	DON; 1	DON; 2	EST; 1	EST; 2	MNZ; 1 Ret	MNZ; 2; 20	42nd	0
2006	Eurointernational	ZOL; 1	ZOL; 2	MON; 1	IST; 1	IST; 2	MIS; 1 Ret	MIS; 2; 21	SPA; 1; 11	SPA; 2; 17									33rd	0
2006	Comtec Racing										NÜR; 1 Ret	NÜR; 2; 19							33rd	0
2006	GD Racing												DON; 1; 21	DON; 2; 16	LMS; 1; 26†	LMS; 2; 12	CAT; 1; 21	CAT; 2; 14	33rd	0
2007	Pons Racing	MNZ; 1; 13	MNZ; 2 Ret	NÜR; 1; 17	NÜR; 2; 13	MON; 1; 15	HUN; 1 Ret	HUN; 2; 12	SPA; 1; 8	SPA; 2 Ret	DON; 1; 24†	DON; 2; 20†	MAG; 1; 7	MAG; 2; 5	EST; 1; 17	EST; 2 Ret	CAT; 1; 14	CAT; 2; 21	21st	13

^{†} Driver did not finish the race, but was classified as he completed more than 90% of the race distance.

=== Complete GP2 Series results ===
(key) (Races in bold indicate pole position) (Races in italics indicate fastest lap)

Year	Entrant	1	2	3	4	5	6	7	8	9	10	11	12	13	14	15	16	17	18	19	20	DC	Points
2008	BCN Competición	CAT; FEA	CAT; SPR	IST; FEA	IST; SPR	MON; FEA	MON; SPR	MAG; FEA; 16	MAG; SPR; 13	SIL; FEA; DNS	SIL; SPR; Ret	HOC; FEA; 16	HOC; SPR; 17	HUN; FEA; Ret	HUN; SPR; Ret	VAL; FEA; 13	VAL; SPR; 11	SPA; FEA; Ret	SPA; SPR; 12	MNZ; FEA; 14	MNZ; SPR; 14	29th	0

=== Complete FIA Formula Two Championship results ===
(key) (Races in bold indicate pole position) (Races in italics indicate fastest lap)

Year	1	2	3	4	5	6	7	8	9	10	11	12	13	14	15	16	DC	Points
2009	VAL; 1; 2	VAL; 2; 8	BRN; 1 Ret	BRN; 2 Ret	SPA; 1 Ret	SPA; 2; 10	BRH; 1; 6	BRH; 2; 17	DON; 1 Ret	DON; 2; 9	OSC; 1; 4	OSC; 2; 10	IMO; 1 Ret	IMO; 2; 5	CAT; 1	CAT; 2	11th	21

=== NASCAR ===
(key) (Bold - Pole position awarded by qualifying time. Italics - Pole position earned by points standings or practice time. * – Most laps led.)

==== K&N Pro Series East ====
NASCAR K&N Pro Series East results
Year	Team	No.	Make	1	2	3	4	5	6	7	8	9	10	11	12	13	14	NKNPSEC	Pts	Ref
2012	X-Team Racing	15	Toyota	BRI; 25	GRE; 19	RCH; 33		BGS; 12	JFC; 11	LGY	CNB	COL; 19	IOW	NHA; 31	DOV	GRE	CAR	22nd	179	
2012	X-Team Racing	51	Toyota				IOW; 23											22nd	179	

==== K&N Pro Series West ====
NASCAR K&N Pro Series West results
Year	Team	No.	Make	1	2	3	4	5	6	7	8	9	10	11	12	13	14	15	NKNPSWC	Pts	Ref
2011	X-Team Racing	74	Toyota	PHO	AAS	MMP	IOW	LVS	SON	IRW	EVG	PIR	CNS	MRP	SPO	AAS	PHO; 12		80th	127	
2012	X-Team Racing	74	Toyota	PHO; 6	LHC	MMP	S99	IOW	BIR	LVS	SON	EVG	CNS	IOW	PIR	SMP	AAS	PHO	54th	38	
