= Marcos Martínez (racing driver) =

Spanish racing driver

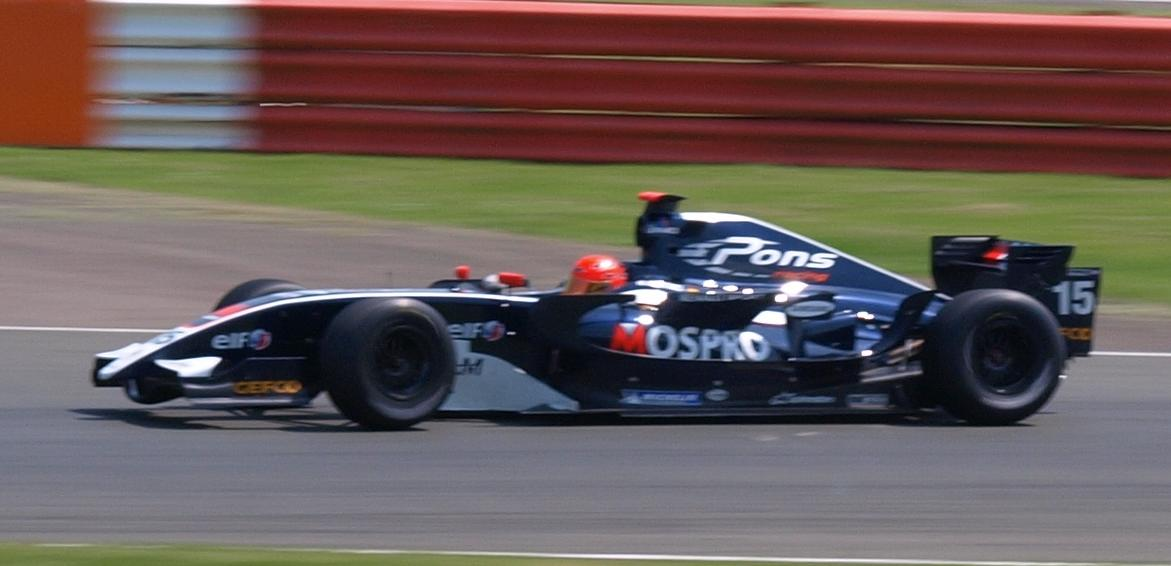
- Martínez driving for Pons Racing at the Silverstone round of the 2008 Formula Renault 3.5 Series season
- Nationality: (Spain) Spanish
- Full name: Marcos Martínez Ucha
- Born: 15 October 1985 (age 41) Madrid, Spain

Previous series
- 2007 2006–09 2005–08 2004: GP2 Series; Formula Renault 3.5 Series; Spanish Formula Three; Formula Junior 1600 Spain

Marcos Martínez Ucha (born 15 October 1985 in Madrid, Spain) is a Spanish former professional racecar driver.

== Career ==
Martínez competed in karting events from 1998 until 2002, when he entered Spanish Formula Junior. He would stay there with moderate success for three years, moving to Spanish Formula Three in 2005 with the team Racing Engineering and reaching the second place in the B-Class. In 2006, he jumped to the A-Class, managing an outstanding victory in Cheste, Valencia. Meanwhile, he participated in three races in the Formula Renault 3.5 Series, where he managed to start fourth on the grid and run in second place in one of the races. In 2007, he began racing Spanish Formula Three with a new team, Novoteam. After 3 meetings and due to the results obtained he changed to Tec-Auto searching for an improvement in the championship.

Martínez competed in the latter part of the 2007 GP2 Series season for the Racing Engineering team, alongside Javier Villa and replacing Ernesto Viso. However, he did not compete in the races of the first meeting in which he was entered, as he failed to lap within 107% of the pole position time after problems in qualifying.

Martínez returned to the Formula Renault 3.5 Series full-time for 2008, driving for Pons Racing alongside compatriot Máximo Cortés, and will continue with the team in 2009. His season began with two wins at the Circuit de Catalunya in Montmeló. He followed that up with a third win in succession at Spa. He was the championship leader at the halfway stage, meaning that he was entitled to demonstrating a Renault Formula One car at the Silverstone meeting. He also added his fourth win of the season at that meeting. He did not score a point after that and slipped to seventh in the championship standings.

== Racing record ==
=== Complete Spanish Formula Three Championship results ===
(key) (Races in bold indicate pole position) (Races in italics indicate fastest lap)

Year	Entrant	1	2	3	4	5	6	7	8	9	10	11	12	13	14	15	16	17	DC	Points
2005	Racing Engineering	JAR; 1 Ret	JAR; 2; 11	VAL; 1 NC	VAL; 2; 8	ALB; Ret	EST; 1; 12	EST; 2; 12	ALB; 1; 5	ALB; 2; 7	VAL; 1; 5	VAL; 2; 14†	JER; 1; 6	JER; 2; 8	CAT; 1; 10	CAT; 2; 2			9th	29
2006	Racing Engineering	VAL; 1; 6	VAL; 2; 1	MAG; 1; 12	MAG; 2; 7	JAR; 1 Ret	JAR; 2; 8	EST; 1; 14	EST; 2; 19	ALB; 1 Ret	ALB; 2; 9	VAL; 1; 7	VAL; 2; 7	JER; 1 Ret	JER; 2 Ret	CAT; 1	CAT; 2		10th	29
2007	Novo Team	JAR; 1; 9	JAR; 2; 4	JER; 1 Ret	JER; 2; 9	EST; 1; 19	EST; 2 Ret												13th	22
2007	Escuderia TEC-Auto							ALB; 1; 20	ALB; 2; 9	MAG; 1; 5	MAG; 2; 3	VAL; 1	VAL; 2	JER; 1	JER; 2	CAT; 1	CAT; 2		13th	22
2008	Escuderia TEC-Auto	JAR; 1	JAR; 2	SPA; 1	SPA; 2	ALB; 1	ALB; 2	VSC; 1	VSC; 2	VF1	MAG; 1	MAG; 2	VAL; 1	VAL; 2	JER; 1	JER; 2	CAT; 1; 6	CAT; 2; 4	NC	-

=== Complete Formula Renault 3.5 Series results ===
(key) (Races in bold indicate pole position) (Races in italics indicate fastest lap)

Year	Entrant	1	2	3	4	5	6	7	8	9	10	11	12	13	14	15	16	17	DC	Points
2006	EuroInternational	ZOL; 1	ZOL; 2	MON; 1	IST; 1	IST; 2	MIS; 1	MIS; 2	SPA; 1	SPA; 2	NÜR; 1 Ret	NÜR; 2 Ret	DON; 1 Ret	DON; 2 Ret	LMS; 1 DNS	LMS; 2 Ret	CAT; 1	CAT; 2	NC	0
2008	Pons Racing	MNZ; 1 Ret	MNZ; 2 Ret	SPA; 1 Ret	SPA; 2; 9	MON; 1; 15	SIL; 1; 2	SIL; 2; 6	HUN; 1; 13	HUN; 2 Ret	NÜR; 1; 11	NÜR; 2; 11	BUG; 1; 15	BUG; 2; 24	EST; 1; 11	EST; 2; 7	CAT; 1 Ret	CAT; 2 Ret	15th	21
2009	Pons Racing	CAT; 1; 1	CAT; 2; 1	SPA; 1; 1	SPA; 2; 5	MON; 1 Ret	HUN; 1; 6	**HUN**; **2** Ret	SIL; 1; 1	SIL; 2; 6	LEM; 1; 17	LEM; 2 Ret	ALG; 1; 15	ALG; 2 Ret	NÜR; 1 Ret	NÜR; 2 Ret	ALC; 1; 11	ALC; 2; 13	7th	73
2011	Pons Racing	ALC; 1	ALC; 2	SPA; 1	SPA; 2	MNZ; 1	MNZ; 2	MON; 1	NÜR; 1	NÜR; 2	HUN; 1 Ret	HUN; 2; 13	SIL; 1	SIL; 2	LEC; 1	LEC; 2	CAT; 1	CAT; 2	31st	0

=== Complete GP2 Series results ===
(key) (Races in bold indicate pole position) (Races in italics indicate fastest lap)

Year	Entrant	1	2	3	4	5	6	7	8	9	10	11	12	13	14	15	16	17	18	19	20	21	DC	Points
2007	Racing Engineering	BHR; FEA	BHR; SPR	CAT; FEA	CAT; SPR	MON; FEA	MAG; FEA	MAG; SPR	SIL; FEA	SIL; SPR	NÜR; FEA	NÜR; SPR	HUN; FEA; DNQ	HUN; SPR; DNQ	IST; FEA; 13	IST; SPR; Ret	MNZ; FEA; Ret	MNZ; SPR; Ret	SPA; FEA; Ret	SPA; SPR; Ret	VAL; FEA; 4	VAL; SPR; 22	22nd	5

=== Complete Superleague Formula results ===
(key)

Year	Team	1	2	3	4	5	6	7	8	9	10	11	12	13	14	15	16	17	18	19	20	21	22	23	24	Rank	Pts
2010	Sevilla FC EmiliodeVillota Motorsport	SIL; 6	SIL; 9	ASS; 12	ASS; 4	MAG; 16	MAG; 17	JAR; 15	JAR; 16	NÜR; 11	NÜR; 13	ZOL; 8	ZOL; 15	**BRH**; 16	BRH; 8	ADR; 14	ADR; 1	POR; 12	POR; 18	ORD; 8	ORD; 9	BEI; 16	BEI; 4	NAV; 15	NAV; 3	14th	355

==== Super Final Results ====
Year	Team	1	2	3	4	5	6	7	8	9	10	11	12
2010	Sevilla FC EmiliodeVillota Motorsport	SIL; DNQ	ASS; DNQ	MAG; DNQ	JAR; DNQ	NÜR; DNQ	ZOL; DNQ	BRH; DNQ	ADR; 5	POR; DNQ	ORD; DNQ	BEI; C	NAV; DNQ
