= 2007 Istanbul Park GP2 Series round =

(Turkey) 2007 Istanbul Park GP2 round
Round details
- Round 8 of 11 rounds in the 2007 GP2 Series
- Istanbul Park
- Location: Istanbul Park, Istanbul, Turkey
- Course: Permanent racing facility 5.338 km (3.317 mi)

GP2 Series

Feature race
- Date: 25 August 2007
- Laps: 34

Pole position
Driver	(Italy) Luca Filippi	Super Nova Racing
- Time: 1:34.279

Podium
First	(Brazil) Lucas di Grassi	ART Grand Prix
Second	(Italy) Giorgio Pantano	Campos Grand Prix
Third	(United Kingdom) Adam Carroll	FMS International

Fastest lap
Driver	(France) Nicolas Lapierre	DAMS
- Time: 1:35.551 (on lap 35)

Sprint race
- Date: 26 August 2007
- Laps: 23

Podium
First	(Germany) Timo Glock	iSport International
Second	(Brazil) Alexandre Negrão	Minardi Piquet Sports
Third	(United Kingdom) Adam Carroll	FMS International

Fastest lap
Driver	(United Arab Emirates) Andreas Zuber	iSport International
- Time: 1:35.733 (on lap 22)

The 2007 Istanbul Park GP2 Series round was a GP2 Series motor race held on August 25 and 26, 2007 at Istanbul Park in Istanbul, Turkey. It was the eighth round of the 2007 GP2 Series season. The race weekend supported the 2007 Turkish Grand Prix.

== Classification ==
=== Qualifying ===
Pos.	No.	Driver	Team	Time	Grid
1	16	(Italy) Luca Filippi	Super Nova International	1:34.278	1
2	5	(Germany) Timo Glock	iSport International	1:34.502	2
3	6	(United Arab Emirates) Andreas Zuber	iSport International	1:34.545	3
4	25	(Italy) Giorgio Pantano	Campos Grand Prix	1:34.609	4
5	9	(United Kingdom) Adam Carroll	Petrol Ofisi FMS International	1:34.650	5
6	2	(Brazil) Lucas di Grassi	ART Grand Prix	1:34.914	6
7	3	(Brazil) Alexandre Negrão	Minardi Piquet Sports	1:35.039	7
8	22	(Japan) Kazuki Nakajima	DAMS	1:35.178	8
9	1	(Switzerland) Sébastien Buemi	ART Grand Prix	1:35.210	9
10	26	(Spain) Borja García	Durango	1:35.218	10
11	24	(Russia) Vitaly Petrov	Campos Grand Prix	1:35.245	11
12	17	(United Kingdom) Mike Conway	Super Nova Racing	1:35.313	12
13	4	(Spain) Roldán Rodríguez	Minardi Piquet Sports	1:35.337	13
14	23	(France) Nicolas Lapierre	DAMS	1:35.487	14
15	10	(Turkey) Jason Tahincioglu	Petrol Ofisi FMS International	1:36.005	15
16	19	(China) Ho-Pin Tung	BCN Competición	1:36.014	16
17	12	(Japan) Kohei Hirate	Trident Racing	1:36.177	17
18	7	(Brazil) Bruno Senna	Arden International	1:36.221	18
19	21	(Spain) Andy Soucek	DPR	1:36.284	19
20	8	(South Africa) Adrian Zaugg	Arden International	1:36.316	20
21	27	(India) Karun Chandhok	Durango	1:36.318	21
22	11	(Argentina) Ricardo Risatti	Trident Racing	1:36.768	22
23	15	(Spain) Marcos Martínez	Racing Engineering	1:37.111	23
24	14	(Spain) Javier Villa	Racing Engineering	1:37.125	24
25	18	(Finland) Henri Karjalainen	BCN Competición	1:38.442	25
26	20	(Denmark) Christian Bakkerud	DPR	No time	26

=== Feature race ===
Pos.	No.	Driver	Team	Laps	Time/Retired	Grid	Points
1	2	(Brazil) Lucas di Grassi	ART Grand Prix	34	57:11.277	6	10
2	25	(Italy) Giorgio Pantano	Campos Grand Prix	34	+1.371	4	8
3	9	(United Kingdom) Adam Carroll	Petrol Ofisi FMS International	34	+5.830	5	6
4	5	(Germany) Timo Glock	iSport International	34	+6.163	2	5
5	26	(Spain) Borja García	Durango	34	+10.183	10	4
6	22	(Japan) Kazuki Nakajima	DAMS	34	+10.774	8	3
7	3	(Brazil) Alexandre Negrão	Minardi Piquet Sports	34	+14.695	7	2
8	27	(India) Karun Chandhok	Durango	34	+19.756	21	1
9	19	(China) Ho-Pin Tung	BCN Competición	34	+20.629	16	
10	7	(Brazil) Bruno Senna	Arden International	34	+22.944	18	
11	4	(Spain) Roldán Rodríguez	Minardi Piquet Sports	34	+27.227	13	
12	14	(Spain) Javier Villa	Racing Engineering	34	+27.589	24	
13	15	(Spain) Marcos Martínez	Racing Engineering	34	+54.026	23	
14	10	(Turkey) Jason Tahincioglu	Petrol Ofisi FMS International	34	+1:09.504	15	
15	23	(France) Nicolas Lapierre	DAMS	34	+1:15.194	14	1
16	11	(Argentina) Ricardo Risatti	Trident Racing	34	+1:32.816	22	
17	24	(Russia) Vitaly Petrov	Campos Grand Prix	33	+1 Lap	11	
Ret	1	(Switzerland) Sébastien Buemi	ART Grand Prix	27	DNF	9	
Ret	6	(United Arab Emirates) Andreas Zuber	iSport International	20	DNF	3	
Ret	12	(Japan) Kohei Hirate	Trident Racing	18	DNF	17	
Ret	18	(Finland) Henri Karjalainen	BCN Competición	15	DNF	25	
Ret	17	(United Kingdom) Mike Conway	Super Nova Racing	2	DNF	12	
Ret	21	(Spain) Andy Soucek	DPR	1	DNF	19	
Ret	16	(Italy) Luca Filippi	Super Nova Racing	0	DNF	1	2
Ret	8	(South Africa) Adrian Zaugg	Arden International	0	DNF	20	
DNS	20	(Denmark) Christian Bakkerud	DPR	0	Back injury	26	

=== Sprint race ===
Pos.	No.	Driver	Team	Laps	Time/Retired	Grid	Points
1	5	(Germany) Timo Glock	iSport International	23	37:21.489	5	6
2	3	(Brazil) Alexandre Negrão	Minardi Piquet Sports	23	+9.469	2	5
3	9	(United Kingdom) Adam Carroll	Petrol Ofisi FMS International	23	+10.884	6	4
4	26	(Spain) Borja García	Durango	23	+18.605	4	3
5	24	(Russia) Vitaly Petrov	Campos Grand Prix	23	+19.168	17	2
6	7	(Brazil) Bruno Senna	Arden International	23	+20.082	10	1
7	16	(Italy) Luca Filippi	Super Nova Racing	23	+21.151	23	
8	4	(Spain) Roldán Rodríguez	Minardi Piquet Sports	23	+24.229	11	
9	19	(China) Ho-Pin Tung	BCN Competición	23	+24.709	9	
10	11	(Argentina) Ricardo Risatti	Trident Racing	23	+40.964	16	
11	2	(Brazil) Lucas di Grassi	ART Grand Prix	23	+1:07.075	8	
12	25	(Italy) Giorgio Pantano	Campos Grand Prix	23	+1:19.182	7	
13	1	(Switzerland) Sébastien Buemi	ART Grand Prix	22	+1 Lap	18	
14	6	(United Arab Emirates) Andreas Zuber	iSport International	22	+1 Lap	19	1
15	8	(South Africa) Adrian Zaugg	Arden International	20	+3 Laps	25	
Ret	14	(Spain) Javier Villa	Racing Engineering	19	DNF	12	
Ret	22	(Japan) Kazuki Nakajima	DAMS	17	DNF	3	
Ret	21	(Spain) Andy Soucek	DPR	16	DNF	23	
Ret	27	(India) Karun Chandhok	Durango	11	DNF	1	
Ret	10	(Turkey) Jason Tahincioglu	Petrol Ofisi FMS International	7	DNF	14	
Ret	15	(Spain) Marcos Martínez	Racing Engineering	5	DNF	13	
Ret	23	(France) Nicolas Lapierre	DAMS	1	DNF	15	
Ret	12	(Japan) Kohei Hirate	Trident Racing	1	DNF	20	
Ret	18	(Finland) Henri Karjalainen	BCN Competición	0	DNF	21	
Ret	17	(United Kingdom) Mike Conway	Super Nova Racing	0	DNF	22	
DNS	20	(Denmark) Christian Bakkerud	DPR	0	Back injury	26	

Previous round: 2007 Hungaroring GP2 Series round	GP2 Series; 2007 season	Next round: 2007 Monza GP2 Series round
Previous round: 2006 Istanbul Park GP2 Series round	Istanbul Park GP2 round	Next round: 2008 Istanbul Park GP2 Series round
