= 2007 Hungaroring GP2 Series round =

2007 Hungary GP2 round
Round details
- Round 7 of 11 rounds in the 2007 GP2 Series
- The Hungaroring layout
- Location: Hungaroring, Mogyoród, Pest, Hungary
- Course: Permanent racing facility 4.381 km (2.722 mi)

GP2 Series

Feature race
- Date: 4 August 2007
- Laps: 41 (179.621 km)

Pole position
Driver	(Germany) Timo Glock	iSport International
- Time: 1:27.566

Podium
First	(United Kingdom) Adam Carroll	FMS International
Second	(Japan) Kazuki Nakajima	DAMS
Third	(United Arab Emirates) Andreas Zuber	iSport International

Fastest lap
Driver	(Switzerland) Sébastien Buemi (Note: Sébastien Buemi set the fastest lap, but he started from the pitlane, so the points were given to Karun Chandhok.)	ART Grand Prix
- Time: 1:29.578 (on lap 35)

Sprint race
- Date: 5 August 2007
- Laps: 28 (122.668 km)

Podium
First	(Spain) Javier Villa	Racing Engineering
Second	(United Kingdom) Adam Carroll	FMS International
Third	(Spain) Roldán Rodríguez	Minardi Piquet Sports

Fastest lap
Driver	(Switzerland) Sébastien Buemi	ART Grand Prix
- Time: 1:28.968 (on lap 26)

The 2007 Hungaroring GP2 Series round was a GP2 Series motor race held on 4 and 5 August 2007 at the Hungaroring in Mogyoród, Pest, Hungary. It was the seventh round of the 2007 GP2 Series season. The race weekend supported the 2007 Hungarian Grand Prix.

== Classification ==
=== Qualifying ===
Pos.	No.	Driver	Team	Time	Gap	Grid
1	5	(Germany) Timo Glock	iSport International	1:27.566		1
2	6	(United Arab Emirates) Andreas Zuber	iSport International	1:27.756	+0.190	2
3	2	(Brazil) Lucas di Grassi	ART Grand Prix	1:28.349	+0.783	3
4	25	(Italy) Giorgio Pantano	Campos Grand Prix	1:28.411	+0.845	4
5	11	(Venezuela) Pastor Maldonado	Trident Racing	1:28.546	+0.980	5
6	9	(United Kingdom) Adam Carroll	Petrol Ofisi FMS International	1:28.648	+1.082	6
7	16	(Italy) Luca Filippi	Super Nova International	1:28.715	+1.149	7
8	22	(Japan) Kazuki Nakajima	DAMS	1:28.716	+1.150	8
9	23	(France) Nicolas Lapierre	DAMS	1:28.775	+1.209	9
10	21	(Spain) Andy Soucek	DPR	1:28.797	+1.231	10
11	26	(Spain) Borja García	Durango	1:28.852	+1.286	11
12	14	(Spain) Javier Villa	Racing Engineering	1:28.869	+1.303	12
13	24	(Russia) Vitaly Petrov	Campos Grand Prix	1:29.038	+1.472	13
14	4	(Spain) Roldán Rodríguez	Minardi Piquet Sports	1:29.127	+1.561	14
15	1	(Switzerland) Sébastien Buemi	ART Grand Prix	1:29.209	+1.643	15
16	19	(China) Ho-Pin Tung	BCN Competicion	1:29.330	+1.764	16
17	20	(Denmark) Christian Bakkerud	DPR	1:29.387	+1.821	17
18	17	(United Kingdom) Mike Conway	Super Nova International	1:29.477	+1.911	21
19	3	(Brazil) Alexandre Negrão	Minardi Piquet Sports	1:29.497	+1.931	18
20	12	(Japan) Kohei Hirate	Trident Racing	1:29.560	+1.994	19
21	8	(South Africa) Adrian Zaugg	Arden International	1:29.588	+2.022	20
22	27	(India) Karun Chandhok	Durango	1:29.899	+2.333	22
23	10	(Turkey) Jason Tahincioğlu	Petrol Ofisi FMS International	1:30.024	+2.458	23
24	7	(Brazil) Bruno Senna	Arden International	1:30.245	+2.679	24
25	18	(Finland) Markus Niemelä	BCN Competicion	1:30.801	+3.235	25
26	15	(Spain) Marcos Martínez	Racing Engineering	1:34.670	+7.104	26
107% time: 1:33.695

- Mike Conway was handed a three place penalty for passing the chequered flag twice during free practice.

=== Feature race ===
Pos.	No.	Driver	Team	Laps	Time/retired	Grid	Points
1	9	(United Kingdom) Adam Carroll	Petrol Ofisi FMS International	41	1:06:39.582	6	10
2	22	(Japan) Kazuki Nakajima	DAMS	41	+0.714	8	8
3	6	(United Arab Emirates) Andreas Zuber	iSport International	41	+1.156	2	6
4	2	(Brazil) Lucas di Grassi	ART Grand Prix	41	+12.204	3	5
5	26	(Spain) Borja García	Durango	41	+13.072	11	4
6	4	(Spain) Roldán Rodríguez	Minardi Piquet Sports	41	+17.513	14	3
7	8	(South Africa) Adrian Zaugg	Arden International	41	+31.138	20	2
8	14	(Spain) Javier Villa	Racing Engineering	41	+31.455	12	1
9	19	(China) Ho-Pin Tung	BCN Competición	41	+31.994	16	
10	5	(Germany) Timo Glock	iSport International	41	+32.399	1	2
11	12	(Japan) Kohei Hirate	Trident Racing	41	+32.826	19	
12	21	(Spain) Andy Soucek	DPR	41	+36.226	10	
13	7	(Brazil) Bruno Senna	Arden International	41	+38.936	24	
14	27	(India) Karun Chandhok	Durango	41	+49.538	22	1
15	1	(Switzerland) Sébastien Buemi	ART Grand Prix	37	+4 laps	15	
Ret	25	(Italy) Giorgio Pantano	Campos Grand Prix	34	Retired	4	
Ret	20	(Denmark) Christian Bakkerud	DPR	28	Retired	17	
Ret	10	(Turkey) Jason Tahincioğlu	Petrol Ofisi FMS International	22	Retired	23	
Ret	24	(Russia) Vitaly Petrov	Campos Grand Prix	12	Retired	13	
Ret	3	(Brazil) Alexandre Negrão	Minardi Piquet Sports	12	Retired	18	
Ret	16	(Italy) Luca Filippi	Super Nova International	12	Retired	7	
Ret	18	(Finland) Markus Niemelä	BCN Competición	11	Retired	25	
Ret	11	(Venezuela) Pastor Maldonado	Trident Racing	8	Retired	5	
Ret	23	(France) Nicolas Lapierre	DAMS	8	Retired	9	
Ret	17	(United Kingdom) Mike Conway	Super Nova International	0	Retired	21	
DNQ	15	(Spain) Marcos Martínez	Racing Engineering	0	Did not qualify		
Fastest lap: Sébastien Buemi (ART Grand Prix) — 1:29.578 (on lap 35)

=== Sprint race ===
Pos.	No.	Driver	Team	Laps	Time/retired	Grid	Points
1	14	(Spain) Javier Villa	Racing Engineering	28	42:29.159	1	6
2	9	(United Kingdom) Adam Carroll	Petrol Ofisi FMS International	28	+0.662	8	5
3	4	(Spain) Roldán Rodríguez	Minardi Piquet Sports	28	+4.455	3	4
4	2	(Brazil) Lucas di Grassi	ART Grand Prix	28	+13.300	5	3
5	26	(Spain) Borja García	Durango	28	+16.498	4	2
6	6	(United Arab Emirates) Andreas Zuber	iSport International	28	+17.307	6	1
7	25	(Italy) Giorgio Pantano	Campos Grand Prix	28	+19.071	16	
8	17	(United Kingdom) Mike Conway	Super Nova International	28	+19.914	23	
9	24	(Russia) Vitaly Petrov	Campos Grand Prix	28	+27.589	18	
10	12	(Japan) Kohei Hirate	Trident Racing	28	+32.429	11	
11	10	(Turkey) Jason Tahincioğlu	Petrol Ofisi FMS International	28	+51.937	17	
12	7	(Brazil) Bruno Senna	Arden International	28	+52.926	13	
13	3	(Brazil) Alexandre Negrão	Minardi Piquet Sports	28	+56.223	19	
14	23	(France) Nicolas Lapierre	DAMS	28	+1:14.519	22	
15^{†}	27	(India) Karun Chandhok	Durango	27	+1 lap	14	
16	16	(Italy) Luca Filippi	Super Nova International	27	+1 lap	20	
17	1	(Switzerland) Sébastien Buemi	ART Grand Prix	27	+1 lap	15	1
Ret	5	(Germany) Timo Glock	iSport International	24	Retired	10	
Ret	21	(Spain) Andy Soucek	DPR	21	Retired	12	
Ret	22	(Japan) Kazuki Nakajima	DAMS	20	Retired	7	
Ret	8	(South Africa) Adrian Zaugg	Arden International	16	Retired	2	
Ret	11	(Venezuela) Pastor Maldonado	Trident Racing	9	Retired	21	
Ret	19	(China) Ho-Pin Tung	BCN Competición	0	Retired	9	
DNS	20	(Denmark) Christian Bakkerud	DPR	0	Did not start		
DNS	18	(Finland) Markus Niemelä	BCN Competición	0	Did not start		
DNQ	15	(Spain) Marcos Martínez	Racing Engineering	0	Did not qualify		
Fastest lap: Sébastien Buemi (ART Grand Prix) — 1:28.968 (on lap 26)

- Christian Bakkerud was unable to start the race due to his back injury.
- Markus Niemelä was unable to start the race after dislocating his shoulder in the feature race.

== Standings after the round ==
Drivers' Championship standings

	Pos	Driver	Points
	1	(Germany) Timo Glock	55
	2	(Brazil) Lucas di Grassi	54
	3	(Italy) Luca Filippi	35
2	4	(Japan) Kazuki Nakajima	33
3	5	(Spain) Javier Villa	28

Teams' Championship standings

	Pos	Team	Points
	1	(United Kingdom) iSport International	82
	2	(France) ART Grand Prix	62
	3	(United Kingdom) Super Nova International	48
2	4	(France) DAMS	42
1	5	(Spain) Campos Grand Prix	37

- Note: Only the top five positions are included for both sets of standings.

== Notes ==
Previous round: 2007 Nürburgring GP2 Series round	GP2 Series; 2007 season	Next round: 2007 Istanbul Park GP2 Series round
Previous round: 2006 Hungaroring GP2 Series round	Hungaroring GP2 round	Next round: 2008 Hungaroring GP2 Series round
