= 2007 Monza GP2 Series round =

Motor racing competition

(Italy) 2007 Monza GP2 round
Round details
- Round 9 of 11 rounds in the 2007 GP2 Series
- Monza
- Location: Autodromo Nazionale Monza, Monza, Italy
- Course: Permanent racing facility 5.793 km (3.600 mi)

GP2 Series

Feature race
- Date: 8 September 2007
- Laps: 32

Pole position
Driver	(Italy) Giorgio Pantano	Campos Grand Prix
- Time: 1:30.546

Podium
First	(Italy) Giorgio Pantano	Campos Grand Prix
Second	(Italy) Luca Filippi	Super Nova Racing
Third	(Germany) Timo Glock	iSport International

Fastest lap
Driver	(Italy) Giorgio Pantano	Campos Grand Prix
- Time: 1:31.442 (on lap 28)

Sprint race
- Date: 9 September 2007
- Laps: 21

Podium
First	(Germany) Timo Glock	iSport International
Second	(Italy) Luca Filippi	Super Nova Racing
Third	(Brazil) Bruno Senna	Arden International

Fastest lap
Driver	(United Kingdom) Adam Carroll	FMS International
- Time: 1:31.595 (on lap 18)

The 2007 Monza GP2 Series round was a GP2 Series motor race held on September 8 and 9, 2007 at the Autodromo Nazionale Monza in Monza, Italy. It was the ninenth round of the 2007 GP2 Series season. The race weekend supported the 2007 Italian Grand Prix.

== Classification ==
=== Qualifying ===
Pos.	No.	Driver	Team	Time	Grid
1	25	(Italy) Giorgio Pantano	Campos Grand Prix	1:30.546	1
2	2	(Brazil) Lucas di Grassi	ART Grand Prix	1:30.879	2
3	24	(Russia) Vitaly Petrov	Campos Grand Prix	1:30.879	3
4	22	(Japan) Kazuki Nakajima	DAMS	1:30.941	4
5	9	(United Kingdom) Adam Carroll	Petrol Ofisi FMS International	1:30.981	5
6	3	(Brazil) Alexandre Negrão	Minardi Piquet Sports	1:31.006	6
7	16	(Italy) Luca Filippi	Super Nova Racing	1:31.048	7
8	5	(Germany) Timo Glock	iSport International	1:31.090	8
9	8	(South Africa) Adrian Zaugg	Arden International	1:31.190	9
10	6	(United Arab Emirates) Andreas Zuber	iSport International	1:31.202	10
11	1	(Switzerland) Sébastien Buemi	ART Grand Prix	1:31.219	11
12	17	(United Kingdom) Mike Conway	Super Nova Racing	1:31.289	12
13	4	(Spain) Roldán Rodríguez	Minardi Piquet Sports	1:31.445	13
14	7	(Brazil) Bruno Senna	Arden International	1:31.499	14
15	26	(Spain) Borja García	Durango	1:31.631	15
16	15	(Spain) Marcos Martínez	Racing Engineering	1:31.670	16
17	14	(Spain) Javier Villa	Racing Engineering	1:31.733	17
18	27	(India) Karun Chandhok	Durango	1:31.826	18
19	23	(France) Nicolas Lapierre	DAMS	1:31.837	19
20	12	(Japan) Kohei Hirate	Trident Racing	1:31.851	20
21	19	(China) Ho-Pin Tung	BCN Competición	1:31.958	21
22	11	(Argentina) Ricardo Risatti	Trident Racing	1:31.971	22
23	20	(France) Olivier Pla	DPR	1:32.125	23
24	10	(Turkey) Jason Tahincioglu	Petrol Ofisi FMS International	1:32.314	24
25	18	(Finland) Markus Niemelä	BCN Competición	1:33.578	25
26	21	(Spain) Andy Soucek	DPR	1:38.111	26

=== Feature race ===
Pos.	No.	Driver	Team	Laps	Time/Retired	Grid	Points
1	25	(Italy) Giorgio Pantano	Campos Grand Prix	32	55:32.531	1	10+2+1
2	16	(Italy) Luca Filippi	Super Nova Racing	32	+7.962	7	8
3	5	(Germany) Timo Glock	iSport International	32	+9.681	8	6
4	7	(Brazil) Bruno Senna	Arden International	32	+13.572	14	5
5	27	(India) Karun Chandhok	Durango	32	+18.393	18	4
6	14	(Spain) Javier Villa	Racing Engineering	32	+19.179	17	3
7	1	(Switzerland) Sébastien Buemi	ART Grand Prix	32	+20.436	11	2
8	11	(Argentina) Ricardo Risatti	Trident Racing	32	+25.100	22	1
9	18	(Finland) Markus Niemelä	BCN Competición	32	+25.604	25	
10	23	(France) Nicolas Lapierre	DAMS	32	+26.156	19	
11	10	(Turkey) Jason Tahincioglu	Petrol Ofisi FMS International	32	+27.113	24	
12	24	(Russia) Vitaly Petrov	Campos Grand Prix	32	+27.897	3	
13	2	(Brazil) Lucas di Grassi	ART Grand Prix	32	+1:13.136	2	
14	3	(Brazil) Alexandre Negrão	Minardi Piquet Sports	31	+1 Lap	6	
Ret	19	(China) Ho-Pin Tung	BCN Competición	21	DNF	21	
Ret	6	(United Arab Emirates) Andreas Zuber	iSport International	17	DNF	10	
Ret	21	(Spain) Andy Soucek	DPR	17	DNF	26	
Ret	9	(United Kingdom) Adam Carroll	Petrol Ofisi FMS International	17	DNF	5	
Ret	4	(Spain) Roldán Rodríguez	Minardi Piquet Sports	13	DNF	13	
Ret	12	(Japan) Kohei Hirate	Trident Racing	3	DNF	20	
Ret	26	(Spain) Borja García	Durango	1	DNF	15	
Ret	8	(South Africa) Adrian Zaugg	Arden International	0	DNF	9	
Ret	17	(United Kingdom) Mike Conway	Super Nova Racing	0	DNF	12	
Ret	15	(Spain) Marcos Martínez	Racing Engineering	0	DNF	16	
Ret	20	(France) Olivier Pla	David Price Racing	0	DNF	23	
DSQ	22	(Japan) Kazuki Nakajima	DAMS	32	Disqualified	4	

- Kazuki Nakajima finished 13th, but was disqualified from the race for causing a collision with Ho-Pin Tung.

=== Sprint race ===
Pos.	No.	Driver	Team	Laps	Time/Retired	Grid	Points
1	5	(Germany) Timo Glock	iSport International	21	32:32.346	6	6
2	16	(Italy) Luca Filippi	Super Nova Racing	21	+1.814	7	5
3	7	(Brazil) Bruno Senna	Arden International	21	+8.470	5	4
4	2	(Brazil) Lucas di Grassi	ART Grand Prix	21	+12.554	13	3
5	6	(United Arab Emirates) Andreas Zuber	iSport International	21	+19.240	16	2
6	27	(India) Karun Chandhok	Durango	21	+21.642	4	1
7	21	(Spain) Andy Soucek	DPR	21	+22.853	25	
8	4	(Spain) Roldán Rodríguez	Minardi Piquet Sports	21	+25.648	24	
9	17	(United Kingdom) Mike Conway	Super Nova Racing	21	+25.739	21	
10	12	(Japan) Kohei Hirate	Trident Racing	21	+26.309	18	
11	18	(Finland) Markus Niemelä	BCN Competición	21	+33.507	9	
12	24	(Russia) Vitaly Petrov	Campos Grand Prix	21	+39.292	12	
13	20	(France) Olivier Pla	DPR	21	+41.350	23	
14	1	(Switzerland) Sébastien Buemi	ART Grand Prix	21	+42.306	2	
15	9	(United Kingdom) Adam Carroll	Petrol Ofisi FMS International	21	+1:19.863	17	1
16	19	(China) Ho-Pin Tung	BCN Competición	20	+1 Lap	15	
17	23	(France) Nicolas Lapierre	DAMS	20	+1 Lap	10	
18	22	(Japan) Kazuki Nakajima	DAMS	20	+1 Lap	26	
19	26	(Spain) Borja García	Durango	20	+1 Lap	19	
20	10	(Turkey) Jason Tahincioglu	Petrol Ofisi FMS International	20	+1 Lap	11	
Ret	11	(Argentina) Ricardo Risatti	Trident Racing	10	DNF	1	
Ret	14	(Spain) Javier Villa	Racing Engineering	9	DNF	3	
Ret	8	(South Africa) Adrian Zaugg	Arden International	2	DNF	20	
Ret	3	(Brazil) Alexandre Negrão	Minardi Piquet Sports	1	DNF	14	
Ret	15	(Spain) Marcos Martínez	Racing Engineering	0	DNF	22	
DSQ	25	(Italy) Giorgio Pantano	Campos Grand Prix	21	Disqualified	8	

- Giorgio Pantano finished 6th, but was disqualified from the race for ignoring the mechanical warning flag instructing him to pit for repairs.

Previous round: 2007 Istanbul Park GP2 Series round	GP2 Series; 2007 season	Next round: 2007 Spa-Francorchamps GP2 Series round
Previous round: 2006 Monza GP2 Series round	Monza GP2 round	Next round: 2008 Monza GP2 Series round
