= 2007 Nürburgring GP2 Series round =

GP2 series motor race

(Germany) 2007 Nürburgring GP2 round
Round details
- Round 6 of 11 rounds in the 2007 GP2 Series
- Location: Nürburgring, Nürburg, Germany
- Course: Permanent racing facility 5.148 km (3.2 mi)

GP2 Series

Feature race
- Date: 21 July 2007
- Laps: 35

Pole position
Driver	(Germany) Timo Glock	iSport International
- Time: 1:40.977

Podium
First	(Germany) Timo Glock	iSport International
Second	(Brazil) Lucas di Grassi	ART Grand Prix
Third	(Japan) Kazuki Nakajima	DAMS

Fastest lap
Driver	(United Kingdom) Mike Conway	Super Nova Racing
- Time: 1:43.006 (on lap 29)

Sprint race
- Date: 22 July 2007
- Laps: 24

Podium
First	(Spain) Javier Villa	Racing Engineering
Second	(Japan) Kohei Hirate	Trident Racing
Third	(Japan) Kazuki Nakajima	DAMS

Fastest lap
Driver	(Switzerland) Sébastien Buemi	ART Grand Prix
- Time: 1:42.512 (on lap 15)

2007 Nürburgring GP2 Series round was a GP2 Series motor race held on 21 July and 22 July at the Nürburgring in Nürburg, Germany. It was the sixth round of the 2007 GP2 Series season. The race was used to support the 2007 European Grand Prix.

== Classification ==
=== Qualifying ===
Pos.	No.	Driver	Team	Time	Grid
1	5	(Germany) Timo Glock	iSport International	1:40.977	1
2	2	(Brazil) Lucas di Grassi	ART Grand Prix	1:41.537	2
3	25	(Italy) Giorgio Pantano	Campos Grand Prix	1:41.673	3
4	8	(South Africa) Adrian Zaugg	Arden International	1:41.721	4
5	6	(United Arab Emirates) Andreas Zuber	iSport International	1:41.757	5
6	22	(Japan) Kazuki Nakajima	DAMS	1:41.830	6
7	9	(United Kingdom) Adam Carroll	Petrol Ofisi FMS International	1:41.866	7
8	11	(Venezuela) Pastor Maldonado	Trident Racing	1:41.963	8
9	17	(United Kingdom) Mike Conway	Super Nova Racing	1:41.964	9
10	16	(Italy) Luca Filippi	Super Nova Racing	1:42.075	10
11	1	(Switzerland) Sébastien Buemi	ART Grand Prix	1:42.155	11
12	21	(Spain) Andy Soucek	David Price Racing	1:42.348	12
13	4	(Spain) Roldán Rodríguez	Minardi Piquet Sports	1:42.356	13
14	12	(Japan) Kohei Hirate	Trident Racing	1:42.368	14
15	14	(Spain) Javier Villa	Racing Engineering	1:42.395	15
16	7	(Brazil) Bruno Senna	Arden International	1:42.497	16
17	3	(Brazil) Alexandre Negrão	Minardi Piquet Sports	1:42.529	17
18	24	(Russia) Vitaly Petrov	Campos Grand Prix	1:42.775	18
19	15	(Venezuela) Ernesto Viso	Racing Engineering	1:42.860	19
20	18	(Japan) Sakon Yamamoto	BCN Competición	1:42.860	20
21	23	(France) Nicolas Lapierre	DAMS	1:42.898	21
22	19	(China) Ho-Pin Tung	BCN Competición	1:42.976	22
23	26	(Spain) Borja García	Durango	1:42.983	23
24	10	(Turkey) Jason Tahincioglu	Petrol Ofisi FMS International	1:43.563	24
25	27	(India) Karun Chandhok	Durango	1:43.862	25
26	20	(Denmark) Christian Bakkerud	David Price Racing	1:44.099	26

=== Feature race ===
Pos.	No.	Driver	Team	Laps	Time/Retired	Grid	Points
1	5	(Germany) Timo Glock	iSport International	35	1:01:32.032	1	10+2
2	2	(Brazil) Lucas di Grassi	ART Grand Prix	35	+2.274	2	8
3	22	(Japan) Kazuki Nakajima	DAMS	35	+2.723	6	6
4	25	(Italy) Giorgio Pantano	Campos Grand Prix	35	+18.937	3	5
5	12	(Japan) Kohei Hirate	Trident Racing	35	+19.806	14	4
6	11	(Venezuela) Pastor Maldonado	Trident Racing	35	+33.680	8	3
7	8	(South Africa) Adrian Zaugg	Arden International	35	+45.779	4	2
8	14	(Spain) Javier Villa	Racing Engineering	35	+36.960	15	1
9	23	(France) Nicolas Lapierre	DAMS	35	+37.478	21	
10	4	(Spain) Roldán Rodríguez	Minardi Piquet Sports	35	+56.548	13	
11	24	(Russia) Vitaly Petrov	Campos Grand Prix	35	+1:00.889	18	
12	3	(Brazil) Alexandre Negrão	Minardi Piquet Sports	35	+1:01.420	17	
13	18	(Japan) Sakon Yamamoto	BCN Competición	35	+1:01.925	20	
14	15	(Venezuela) Ernesto Viso	Racing Engineering	35	+1:02.849	19	
15	7	(Brazil) Bruno Senna	Arden International	35	+1:03.189	16	
16	19	(China) Ho-Pin Tung	BCN Competición	35	+1:08.460	22	
17	10	(Turkey) Jason Tahincioglu	Petrol Ofisi FMS International	34	+1 lap	24	
18	17	(United Kingdom) Mike Conway	Super Nova Racing	34	+1 lap	9	1
19	26	(Spain) Borja García	Durango	33	+2 laps	23	
Ret	21	(Spain) Andy Soucek	David Price Racing	29	Did not finish	12	
Ret	27	(India) Karun Chandhok	Durango	26	Engine	25	
Ret	9	(United Kingdom) Adam Carroll	Petrol Ofisi FMS International	18	Accidente	7	
Ret	6	(United Arab Emirates) Andreas Zuber	iSport International	5	Engine	5	
Ret	20	(Denmark) Christian Bakkerud	David Price Racing	2	Did not finish	26	
Ret	16	(Italy) Luca Filippi	Super Nova Racing	1	Did not finish	10	
Ret	1	(Switzerland) Sébastien Buemi	ART Grand Prix	1	Did not finish	11	

=== Sprint race ===
Pos.	No.	Driver	Team	Laps	Time/Retired	Grid	Points
1	14	(Spain) Javier Villa	Racing Engineering	24	41:36.640	1	6
2	12	(Japan) Kohei Hirate	Trident Racing	24	+3.589	4	5
3	22	(Japan) Kazuki Nakajima	DAMS	24	+4.056	6	4
4	11	(Venezuela) Pastor Maldonado	Trident Racing	24	+7.710	3	3
5	5	(Germany) Timo Glock	iSport International	24	+9.301	8	2
6	2	(Brazil) Lucas di Grassi	ART Grand Prix	24	+10.508	7	1
7	25	(Italy) Giorgio Pantano	Campos Grand Prix	24	+14.375	5	
8	15	(Venezuela) Ernesto Viso	Racing Engineering	24	+19.501	14	
9	4	(Spain) Roldán Rodríguez	Minardi Piquet Sports	24	+21.272	10	
10	3	(Brazil) Alexandre Negrão	Minardi Piquet Sports	24	+22.211	12	
11	18	(Japan) Sakon Yamamoto	BCN Competición	24	+27.499	13	
12	26	(Spain) Borja García	Durango	24	+30.170	19	
13	21	(Spain) Andy Soucek	David Price Racing	24	+30.585	20	
14	9	(United Kingdom) Adam Carroll	Petrol Ofisi FMS International	24	+31.254	22	
15	17	(United Kingdom) Mike Conway	Super Nova Racing	24	+31.285	18	
16	27	(India) Karun Chandhok	Durango	24	+41.090	21	
17	24	(Russia) Vitaly Petrov	Campos Grand Prix	24	+42.296	11	
18	20	(Denmark) Christian Bakkerud	David Price Racing	24	+56.390	24	
19	10	(Turkey) Jason Tahincioglu	Petrol Ofisi FMS International	24	+57.493	17	
20	1	(Switzerland) Sébastien Buemi	ART Grand Prix	24	+1:29.820	26	1
21	6	(United Arab Emirates) Andreas Zuber	iSport International	24	+1:36.516	23	
22	19	(China) Ho-Pin Tung	BCN Competición	21	Accidente	16	
Ret	8	(South Africa) Adrian Zaugg	Arden International	15	Accidente	2	
Ret	16	(Italy) Luca Filippi	Super Nova Racing	9	Accidente	25	
Ret	7	(Brazil) Bruno Senna	Arden International	1	Suspension	15	
Ret	23	(France) Nicolas Lapierre	DAMS	0	Accidente	9	

Previous round: 2007 Silverstone GP2 Series round	GP2 Series; 2007 season	Next round: 2007 Hungaroring GP2 Series round
Previous round: 2005 Nürburgring GP2 Series round	Nürburgring GP2 round	Next round: 2009 Nürburgring GP2 Series round
