= 2007 Monaco GP2 Series round =

Motor racing competition

2007 Monaco GP2 round
Round details
- Round 3 of 11 rounds in the 2007 GP2 Series
- Location: Circuit de Monaco, Monte Carlo, Monaco
- Course: Permanent racing facility 3.340 km (2.08 mi)

GP2 Series

Feature race
- Date: 26 May 2007
- Laps: 45

Pole position
Driver	(Venezuela) Pastor Maldonado	Trident Racing
- Time: 1:20.820

Podium
First	(Venezuela) Pastor Maldonado	Trident Racing
Second	(Italy) Giorgio Pantano	Campos Grand Prix
Third	(Germany) Timo Glock	iSport International

Fastest lap
Driver	(Brazil) Alexandre Negrão	Minardi Piquet Sports
- Time: 1:22.584 (on lap 44)

Sprint race

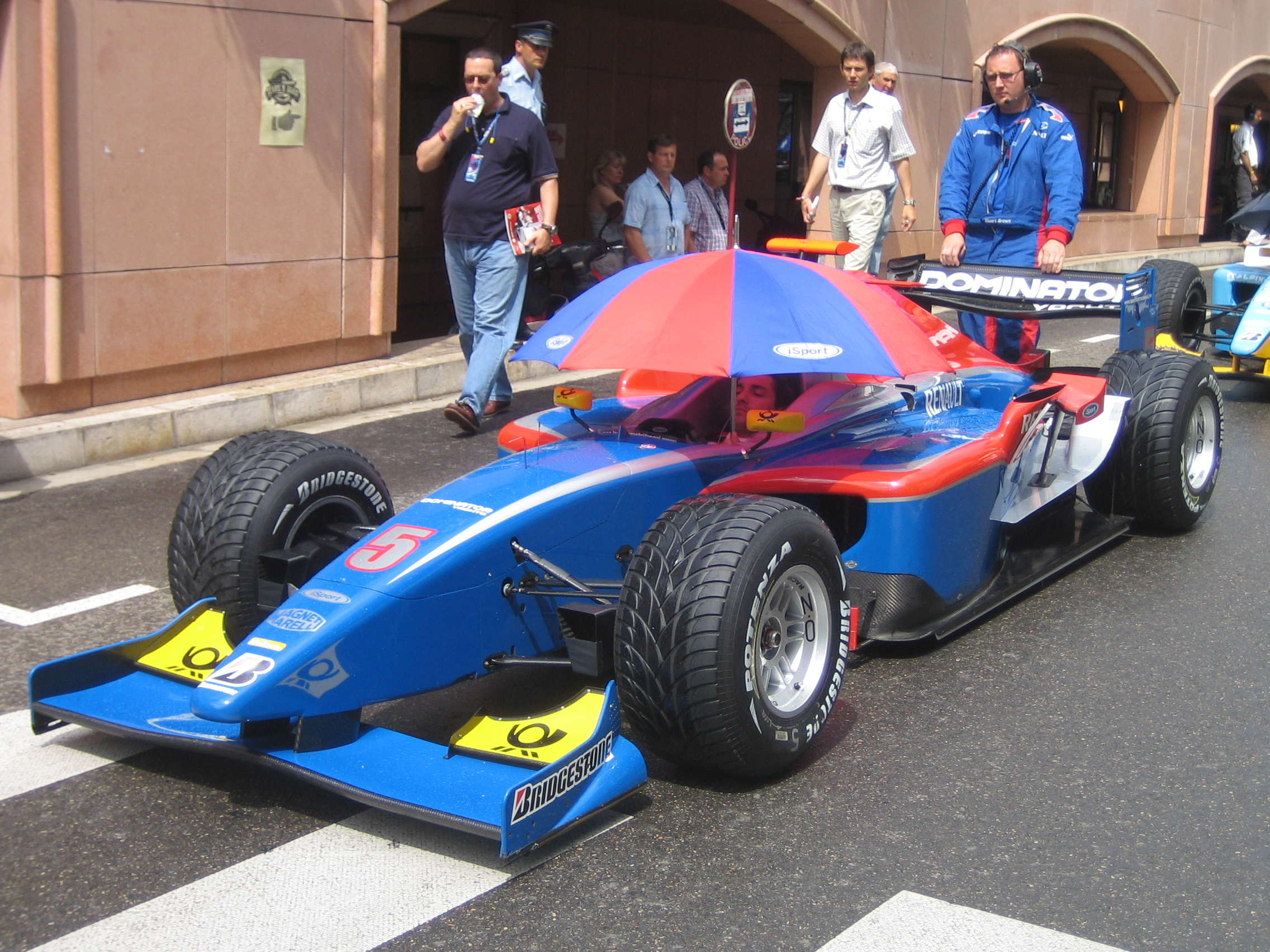
Timo Glock

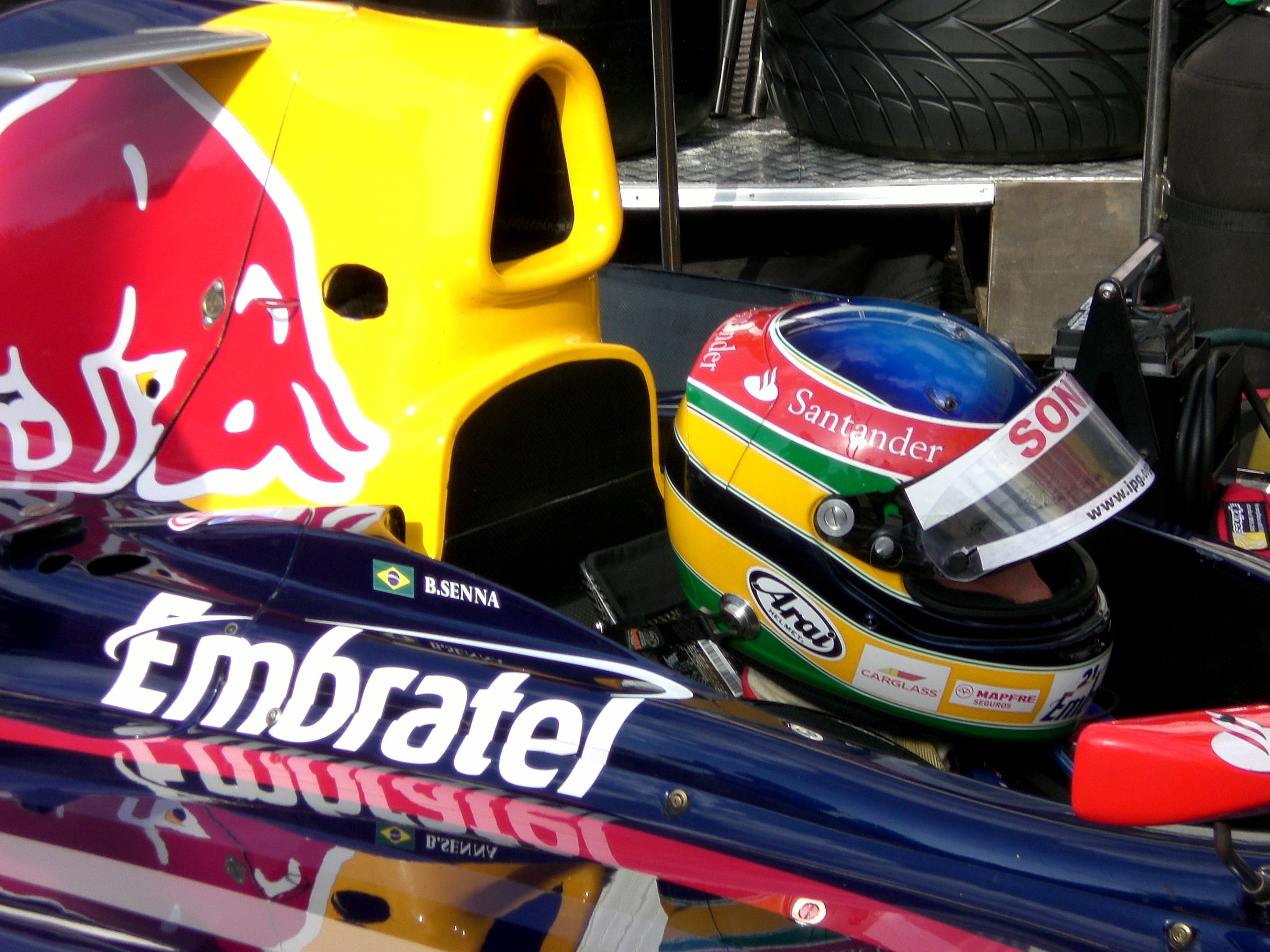
Bruno Senna

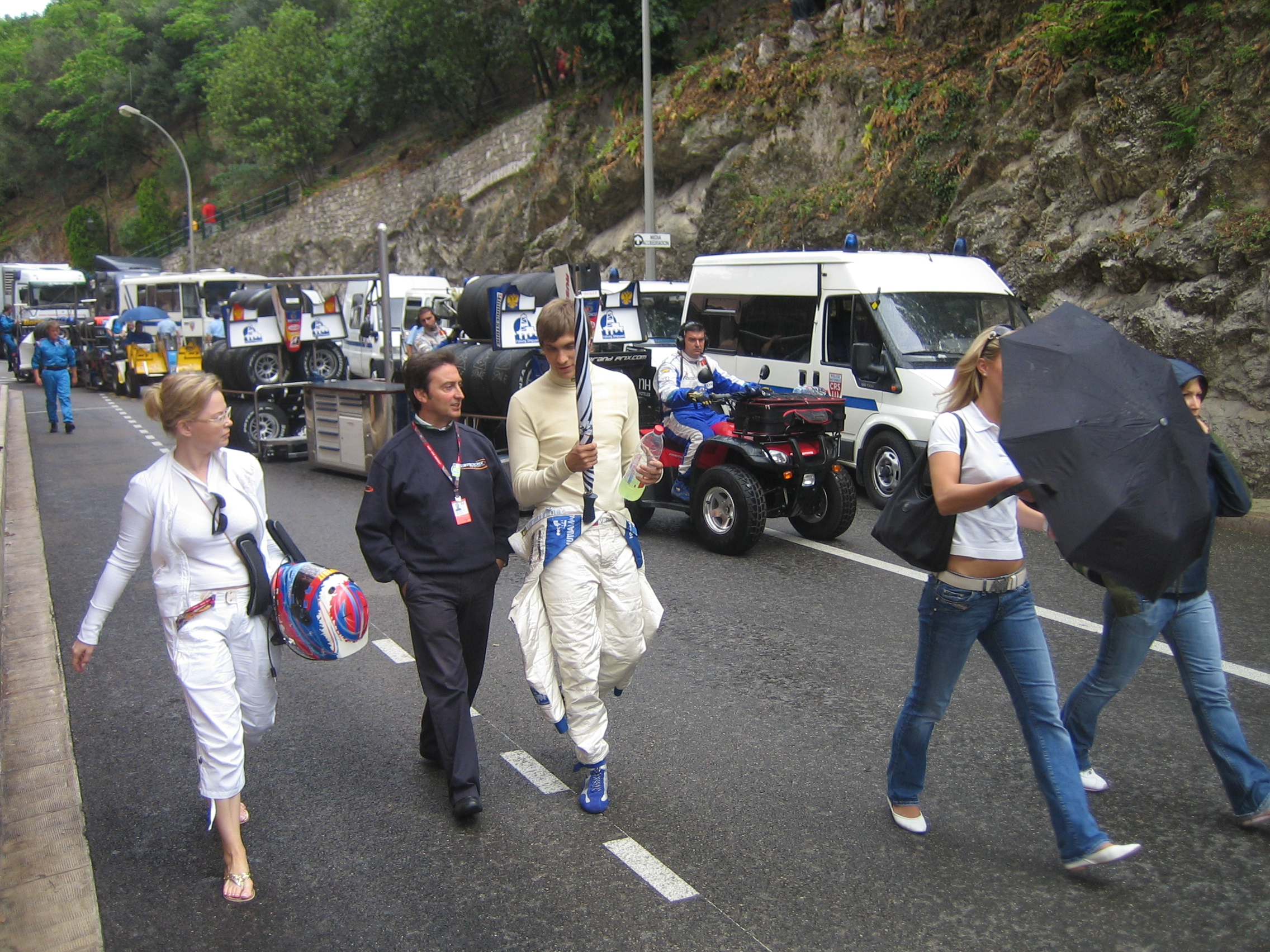
Vitaly Petrov in the middle and her manager Oksana Kosachenko in the picture on the left.

2007 Monaco GP2 Series round was a GP2 Series motor race held on 26 May 2007 at the Circuit de Monaco in Monte Carlo, Monaco. It was the third race of the 2007 GP2 Series. The race was used to support the 2007 Monaco Grand Prix.

== Classification ==
=== Qualifying ===
Pos.	No.	Driver	Team	Time	Grid
1	11	(Venezuela) Pastor Maldonado	Trident Racing	1:20.820	1
2	25	(Italy) Giorgio Pantano	Campos Grand Prix	1:21.158	2
3	6	(United Arab Emirates) Andreas Zuber	iSport International	1:21.273	3
4	1	(Switzerland) Sébastien Buemi	ART Grand Prix	1:21.387	4
5	2	(Brazil) Lucas Di Grassi	ART Grand Prix	1:21.541	5
6	24	(Russia) Vitaly Petrov	Campos Grand Prix	1:21.579	6
7	16	(Italy) Luca Filippi	Super Nova Racing	1:21.659	7
8	5	(Germany) Timo Glock	iSport International	1:21.684	8
9	7	(Brazil) Bruno Senna	Arden International	1:21.827	9
10	17	(United Kingdom) Mike Conway	Super Nova Racing	1:21.971	10
11	8	(South Africa) Adrian Zaugg	Arden International	1:21.986	11
12	9	(Brazil) Antônio Pizzonia	Petrol Ofisi FMS International	1:22.070	12
13	23	(France) Nicolas Lapierre	DAMS	1:22.089	13
14	14	(Spain) Javier Villa	Racing Engineering	1:22.290	14
15	27	(India) Karun Chandhok	Durango	1:22.348	15
16	4	(Spain) Roldán Rodríguez	Minardi Piquet Sports	1:22.370	16
17	21	(Spain) Andy Soucek	David Price Racing	1:22.392	17
18	22	(Japan) Kazuki Nakajima	DAMS	1:22.503	18
19	20	(Denmark) Christian Bakkerud	David Price Racing	1:22.729	19
20	26	(Spain) Borja García	Durango	1:22.781	20
21	15	(Brazil) Sérgio Jimenez	Racing Engineering	1:22.866	21
22	19	(China) Ho-Pin Tung	BCN Competición	1:23.598	22
23	18	(Japan) Sakon Yamamoto	BCN Competición	1:23.645	23
24	10	(Turkey) Jason Tahincioglu	Petrol Ofisi FMS International	1:23.996	24
25	12	(Japan) Kohei Hirate	Trident Racing	1:24.350	25
26	3	(Brazil) Alexandre Negrão	Minardi Piquet Sports	No time	26

=== Feature race ===
Pos.	No.	Driver	Team	Laps	Time/Retired	Grid	Points
1	11	(Venezuela) Pastor Maldonado	Trident Racing	45	1:06:49.495	1	10+2
2	25	(Italy) Giorgio Pantano	Campos Grand Prix	45	+8.439	2	8
3	5	(Germany) Timo Glock	iSport International	45	+10.936	8	6
4	16	(Italy) Luca Filippi	Super Nova Racing	45	+11.302	7	5
5	2	(Brazil) Lucas Di Grassi	ART Grand Prix	45	+14.286	5	4
6	24	(Russia) Vitaly Petrov	Campos Grand Prix	45	+15.059	6	3
7	1	(Switzerland) Sébastien Buemi	ART Grand Prix	45	+16.622	4	2
8	9	(Brazil) Antônio Pizzonia	Petrol Ofisi FMS International	45	+18.104	12	1
9	8	(South Africa) Adrian Zaugg	Arden International	45	+18.714	11	
10	22	(Japan) Kazuki Nakajima	DAMS	45	+23.139	18	
11	7	(Brazil) Bruno Senna	Arden International	45	+23.526	9	
12	12	(Japan) Kohei Hirate	Trident Racing	45	+42.152	25	
13	19	(China) Ho-Pin Tung	BCN Competición	45	+45.834	22	
14	21	(Spain) Andy Soucek	David Price Racing	45	+1:08.405	17	
15	3	(Brazil) Alexandre Negrão	Minardi Piquet Sports	44	+1 lap	26	1
16	26	(Spain) Borja García	Durango	40	Did not finish	20	
17	15	(Brazil) Sérgio Jimenez	Racing Engineering	40	Did not finish	21	
Ret	20	(Denmark) Christian Bakkerud	David Price Racing	28	Did not finish	19	
Ret	10	(Turkey) Jason Tahincioglu	Petrol Ofisi FMS International	26	Did not finish	24	
Ret	14	(Spain) Javier Villa	Racing Engineering	23	Did not finish	14	
Ret	23	(France) Nicolas Lapierre	DAMS	16	Did not finish	13	
Ret	4	(Spain) Roldán Rodríguez	Minardi Piquet Sports	14	Did not finish	16	
Ret	18	(Japan) Sakon Yamamoto	BCN Competición	9	Did not finish	23	
Ret	17	(United Kingdom) Mike Conway	Super Nova Racing	6	Did not finish	10	
Ret	6	(United Arab Emirates) Andreas Zuber	iSport International	0	Did not finish	3	
Ret	27	(India) Karun Chandhok	Durango	0	Did not finish	15	

Previous round: 2007 Catalunya GP2 Series round	GP2 Series; 2007 season	Next round: 2007 Magny-Cours GP2 Series round
Previous round: 2006 Monaco GP2 Series round	Monaco GP2 round	Next round: 2008 Monaco GP2 Series round
