= 2007 Catalunya GP2 Series round =

2007 GP2 race held in Spain

(Spain) 2007 Spanish GP2 round
Round details
- Round 2 of 11 rounds in the 2007 GP2 Series
- Location: Circuit de Catalunya, Montmeló, Catalonia, Spain
- Course: Permanent racing facility 4.627 km (2.875 mi)

GP2 Series

Feature race
- Date: 12 May 2007
- Laps: 38

Pole position
Driver	(Germany) Timo Glock	iSport International
- Time: 1:27.713

Podium
First	(Brazil) Bruno Senna	Arden International
Second	(Germany) Timo Glock	iSport International
Third	(Brazil) Lucas di Grassi	ART Grand Prix

Fastest lap
Driver	(Japan) Kazuki Nakajima	DAMS
- Time: 1:29.989 (on lap 36)

Sprint race
- Date: 13 May 2007
- Laps: 25

Podium
First	(Germany) Timo Glock	iSport International
Second	(Spain) Javier Villa	Racing Engineering
Third	(Brazil) Lucas di Grassi	ART Grand Prix

Fastest lap
Driver	(Germany) Timo Glock	iSport International
- Time: 1:30.269 (on lap 16)

2007 Catalunya GP2 Series round was a GP2 Series motor race held on 12 May and 13 May 2007 at the Circuit de Catalunya in Montmeló, Catalonia, Spain. It was the second race of the 2007 GP2 Series season. The race was used to support the 2007 Spanish Grand Prix.

== Classification ==
=== Qualifying ===
Pos.	No.	Driver	Team	Time	Grid
1	5	(Germany) Timo Glock	iSport International	1:27.713	1
2	6	(United Arab Emirates) Andreas Zuber	iSport International	1:28.102	2
3	25	(Italy) Giorgio Pantano	Campos Grand Prix	1:28.484	6
4	2	(Brazil) Lucas di Grassi	ART Grand Prix	1:28.681	3
5	22	(Japan) Kazuki Nakajima	DAMS	1:28.696	15
6	23	(France) Nicolas Lapierre	DAMS	1:28.712	4
7	17	(United Kingdom) Mike Conway	Super Nova Racing	1:28.717	5
8	7	(Brazil) Bruno Senna	Arden International	1:28.762	7
9	26	(Spain) Borja García	Durango	1:28.808	8
10	16	(Italy) Luca Filippi	Super Nova Racing	1:28.941	9
11	27	(India) Karun Chandhok	Durango	1:29.025	10
12	9	(Brazil) Antônio Pizzonia	Petrol Ofisi FMS International	1:29.146	11
13	4	(Spain) Roldán Rodríguez	Minardi Piquet Sports	1:29.349	12
14	3	(Brazil) Alexandre Negrão	Minardi Piquet Sports	1:29.494	13
15	18	(Japan) Sakon Yamamoto	BCN Competición	1:29.552	18
16	12	(Japan) Kohei Hirate	Trident Racing	1:29.574	14
17	8	(South Africa) Adrian Zaugg	Arden International	1:29.698	16
18	24	(Russia) Vitaly Petrov	Campos Grand Prix	1:29.717	17
19	15	(Brazil) Sérgio Jimenez	Racing Engineering	1:29.727	19
20	11	(Venezuela) Pastor Maldonado	Trident Racing	1:29.810	20
21	1	(Russia) Mikhail Aleshin	ART Grand Prix	1:30.026	21
22	21	(Spain) Andy Soucek	David Price Racing	1:30.130	25
23	10	(Turkey) Jason Tahincioglu	Petrol Ofisi FMS International	1:30.392	22
24	20	(Denmark) Christian Bakkerud	David Price Racing	1:30.843	23
25	19	(China) Ho-Pin Tung	BCN Competición	1:31.636	24
26	14	(Spain) Javier Villa	Racing Engineering	1:32.173	25

=== Feature race ===
Pos.	No.	Driver	Team	Laps	Time/Retired	Grid	Points
1	7	(Brazil) Bruno Senna	Arden International	38	1:02:15.237	7	10
2	5	(Germany) Timo Glock	iSport International	38	+5.333	1	8+2
3	2	(Brazil) Lucas di Grassi	ART Grand Prix	38	+29.210	3	6
4	4	(Spain) Roldán Rodríguez	Minardi Piquet Sports	38	+30.204	12	5
5	26	(Spain) Borja García	Durango	38	+48.253	8	4
6	1	(Russia) Mikhail Aleshin	ART Grand Prix	38	+52.274	21	3
7	15	(Brazil) Sérgio Jimenez	Racing Engineering	38	+55.994	19	2
8	14	(Spain) Javier Villa	Racing Engineering	38	+56.815	26	1
9	18	(Japan) Sakon Yamamoto	BCN Competición	38	+1:02.269	18	
10	24	(Russia) Vitaly Petrov	Campos Grand Prix	38	+1:14.113	17	
11	19	(China) Ho-Pin Tung	BCN Competición	38	+1:15.050	24	
12	20	(Denmark) Christian Bakkerud	David Price Racing	38	+1:27.561	23	
13	12	(Japan) Kohei Hirate	Trident Racing	38	+1:27.922	14	
14	21	(Spain) Andy Soucek	David Price Racing	38	+1:41.215	25	
15	22	(Japan) Kazuki Nakajima	DAMS	36	+2 laps	15	1
Ret	8	(South Africa) Adrian Zaugg	Arden International	21	Did not finish	16	
Ret	23	(France) Nicolas Lapierre	DAMS	21	Did not finish	4	
Ret	11	(Venezuela) Pastor Maldonado	Trident Racing	18	Did not finish	20	
Ret	9	(Brazil) Antônio Pizzonia	Petrol Ofisi FMS International	11	Did not finish	11	
Ret	17	(United Kingdom) Mike Conway	Super Nova Racing	0	Did not finish	5	
Ret	25	(Italy) Giorgio Pantano	Campos Grand Prix	0	Did not finish	6	
Ret	16	(Italy) Luca Filippi	Super Nova Racing	0	Did not finish	9	
Ret	27	(India) Karun Chandhok	Durango	0	Did not finish	10	
Ret	3	(Brazil) Alexandre Negrão	Minardi Piquet Sports	0	Did not finish	13	
DNS	6	(United Arab Emirates) Andreas Zuber	iSport International	0	Did not start	2	
DNS	10	(Turkey) Jason Tahincioglu	Petrol Ofisi FMS International	0	Did not start	22	

=== Sprint race ===
Pos.	No.	Driver	Team	Laps	Time/Retired	Grid	Points
1	5	(Germany) Timo Glock	iSport International	25	38:08.585	7	6+1
2	14	(Spain) Javier Villa	Racing Engineering	25	+8.579	1	5
3	2	(Brazil) Lucas di Grassi	ART Grand Prix	25	+9.139	6	4
4	7	(Brazil) Bruno Senna	Arden International	25	+9.314	8	3
5	15	(Brazil) Sérgio Jimenez	Racing Engineering	25	+22.697	2	2
6	25	(Italy) Giorgio Pantano	Campos Grand Prix	25	+23.457	22	1
7	22	(Japan) Kazuki Nakajima	DAMS	25	+25.105	15	
8	9	(Brazil) Antônio Pizzonia	Petrol Ofisi FMS International	25	+28.026	19	
9	6	(United Arab Emirates) Andreas Zuber	iSport International	25	+28.677	20	
10	12	(Japan) Kohei Hirate	Trident Racing	25	+30.978	13	
11	16	(Italy) Luca Filippi	Super Nova Racing	25	+36.954	23	
12	17	(United Kingdom) Mike Conway	Super Nova Racing	25	+40.398	21	
13	8	(South Africa) Adrian Zaugg	Arden International	25	+41.259	16	
14	26	(Spain) Borja García	Durango	25	+42.933	4	
15	27	(India) Karun Chandhok	Durango	25	+43.857	24	
16	24	(Russia) Vitaly Petrov	Campos Grand Prix	24	+1 lap/DNF	10	
17	11	(Venezuela) Pastor Maldonado	Trident Racing	24	+1 lap/DNF	18	
18	18	(Japan) Sakon Yamamoto	BCN Competición	22	+3 laps/DNF	9	
Ret	1	(Russia) Mikhail Aleshin	ART Grand Prix	15	Did not finish	3	
Ret	20	(Denmark) Christian Bakkerud	David Price Racing	12	Did not finish	12	
Ret	19	(China) Ho-Pin Tung	BCN Competición	8	Did not finish	11	
Ret	21	(Spain) Andy Soucek	David Price Racing	1	Did not finish	14	
Ret	4	(Spain) Roldán Rodríguez	Minardi Piquet Sports	0	Did not finish	5	
Ret	10	(Turkey) Jason Tahincioglu	Petrol Ofisi FMS International	0	Did not finish	26	
DNS	23	(France) Nicolas Lapierre	DAMS	0	Did not start	17	
DNS	3	(Brazil) Alexandre Negrão	Minardi Piquet Sports	0	Did not start	25	

Previous round: 2007 Bahrain GP2 Series round	GP2 Series; 2007 season	Next round: 2007 Monaco GP2 Series round
Previous round: 2006 Catalunya GP2 Series round	Catalunya GP2 round	Next round: 2008 Catalunya GP2 Series round
