= 2007 Silverstone GP2 Series round =

2007 GP2 race held in the United Kingdom

(United Kingdom) 2007 Silverstone GP2 round
Round details
- Round 5 of 11 rounds in the 2007 GP2 Series
- Silverstone Circuit
- Location: Silverstone Circuit, Northamptonshire and Buckinghamshire, England
- Course: Permanent racing circuit 5.141 km (3.194 mi)

GP2 Series

Feature race
- Date: 7 July 2007
- Laps: 35

Pole position
Driver	(United Arab Emirates) Andreas Zuber	iSport International
- Time: 1:28.043

Podium
First	(United Arab Emirates) Andreas Zuber	iSport International
Second	(United Kingdom) Mike Conway	Super Nova Racing
Third	(Japan) Kazuki Nakajima	DAMS

Fastest lap
Driver	(United Arab Emirates) Andreas Zuber	iSport International
- Time: 1:31.052 (on lap 3)

Sprint race
- Date: 8 July 2007
- Laps: 24

Podium
First	(United Kingdom) Adam Carroll	Petrol Ofisi FMS International
Second	(Venezuela) Pastor Maldonado	Trident Racing
Third	(Japan) Kazuki Nakajima	DAMS

Fastest lap
Driver	(Japan) Kazuki Nakajima	DAMS
- Time: 1:30.590 (on lap 21)

2007 Silverstone GP2 Series round was a GP2 Series motor race held on 7 and 8 July 2007 at Silverstone Circuit, United Kingdom. It was the fifth round of the 2007 GP2 Series season. The race weekend supported the 2007 British Grand Prix.

== Classification ==
=== Qualifying ===
Pos.	No.	Driver	Team	Time	Grid
1	6	(United Arab Emirates) Andreas Zuber	iSport International	1:28.043	1
2	17	(United Kingdom) Mike Conway	Super Nova Racing	1:28.256	2
3	2	(Brazil) Lucas di Grassi	ART Grand Prix	1:28.321	3
4	22	(Japan) Kazuki Nakajima	DAMS	1:28.608	4
5	5	(Germany) Timo Glock	iSport International	1:28.671	5
6	9	(United Kingdom) Adam Carroll	Petrol Ofisi FMS International	1:28.759	6
7	1	(Germany) Michael Ammermüller	ART Grand Prix	1:29.085	7
8	27	(India) Karun Chandhok	Durango	1:29.179	8
9	4	(Spain) Roldán Rodríguez	Minardi Piquet Sports	1:29.225	9
10	23	(France) Nicolas Lapierre	DAMS	1:29.243	10
11	16	(Italy) Luca Filippi	Super Nova Racing	1:29.246	11
12	18	(Japan) Sakon Yamamoto	BCN Competición	1:29.376	12
13	25	(Italy) Giorgio Pantano	Campos Grand Prix	1:29.471	13
14	11	(Venezuela) Pastor Maldonado	Trident Racing	1:29.522	19
15	24	(Russia) Vitaly Petrov	Campos Grand Prix	1:29.595	14
16	19	(China) Ho-Pin Tung	BCN Competición	1:29.646	15
17	8	(South Africa) Adrian Zaugg	Arden International	1:29.695	16
18	26	(Spain) Borja García	Durango	1:29.696	17
19	15	(Portugal) Filipe Albuquerque	Racing Engineering	1:29.749	18
20	12	(Japan) Kohei Hirate	Trident Racing	1:29.899	25
21	14	(Spain) Javier Villa	Racing Engineering	1:29.965	20
22	21	(Spain) Andy Soucek	David Price Racing	1:30.031	26
23	3	(Brazil) Alexandre Negrão	Minardi Piquet Sports	1:30.270	21
24	20	(Denmark) Christian Bakkerud	David Price Racing	1:30.557	22
25	10	(Turkey) Jason Tahincioglu	Petrol Ofisi FMS International	1:30.888	23
26	7	(Brazil) Bruno Senna	Arden International	No time	24

=== Feature race ===
Pos.	No.	Driver	Team	Laps	Time/Retired	Grid	Points
1	6	(United Arab Emirates) Andreas Zuber	iSport International	35	54:21.118	1	10+2+1
2	17	(United Kingdom) Mike Conway	Super Nova Racing	35	+1.815	2	8
3	22	(Japan) Kazuki Nakajima	DAMS	35	+16.916	4	6
4	2	(Brazil) Lucas di Grassi	ART Grand Prix	35	+28.365	3	5
5	16	(Italy) Luca Filippi	Super Nova Racing	35	+36.481	11	4
6	9	(United Kingdom) Adam Carroll	Petrol Ofisi FMS International	35	+47.392	6	3
7	11	(Venezuela) Pastor Maldonado	Trident Racing	35	+48.300	19	2
8	4	(Spain) Roldán Rodríguez	Minardi Piquet Sports	35	+51.681	9	1
9	24	(Russia) Vitaly Petrov	Campos Grand Prix	35	+54.214	14	
10	1	(Germany) Michael Ammermüller	ART Grand Prix	35	+58.845	7	
11	7	(Brazil) Bruno Senna	Arden International	35	+58.955	26	
12	27	(India) Karun Chandhok	Durango	35	+1:00.810	8	
13	14	(Spain) Javier Villa	Racing Engineering	35	+1:01.243	20	
14	8	(South Africa) Adrian Zaugg	Arden International	35	+1:02.947	16	
15	15	(Portugal) Filipe Albuquerque	Racing Engineering	35	+1:05.102	18	
16	18	(Japan) Sakon Yamamoto	BCN Competición	35	+1:06.357	12	
17	19	(China) Ho-Pin Tung	BCN Competición	35	+1:07.999	15	
18	12	(Japan) Kohei Hirate	Trident Racing	35	+1:22.338	25	
19	10	(Turkey) Jason Tahincioglu	Petrol Ofisi FMS International	35	+1:23.255	23	
20	26	(Spain) Borja García	Durango	31	Did not finish	17	
Ret	5	(Germany) Timo Glock	iSport International	26	Did not finish	5	
Ret	23	(France) Nicolas Lapierre	DAMS	19	Did not finish	10	
Ret	25	(Italy) Giorgio Pantano	Campos Grand Prix	17	Did not finish	13	
Ret	3	(Brazil) Alexandre Negrão	Minardi Piquet Sports	8	Did not finish	21	
Ret	20	(Denmark) Christian Bakkerud	David Price Racing	1	Did not finish	22	
Ret	21	(Spain) Andy Soucek	David Price Racing	0	Did not finish	26	

=== Sprint race ===
Pos.	No.	Driver	Team	Laps	Time/Retired	Grid	Points
1	9	(United Kingdom) Adam Carroll	Petrol Ofisi FMS International	24	36:41.162	3	6
2	11	(Venezuela) Pastor Maldonado	Trident Racing	24	+4.868	2	5
3	22	(Japan) Kazuki Nakajima	DAMS	24	+5.241	6	4+1
4	2	(Brazil) Lucas di Grassi	ART Grand Prix	24	+13.748	5	3
5	17	(United Kingdom) Mike Conway	Super Nova Racing	24	+13.904	7	2
6	6	(United Arab Emirates) Andreas Zuber	iSport International	24	+14.281	8	1
7	16	(Italy) Luca Filippi	Super Nova Racing	24	+19.485	4	
8	25	(Italy) Giorgio Pantano	Campos Grand Prix	24	+21.842	23	
9	24	(Russia) Vitaly Petrov	Campos Grand Prix	24	+24.170	9	
10	7	(Brazil) Bruno Senna	Arden International	24	+24.333	11	
11	4	(Spain) Roldán Rodríguez	Minardi Piquet Sports	24	+35.385	1	
12	1	(Germany) Michael Ammermüller	ART Grand Prix	24	+37.752	10	
13	27	(India) Karun Chandhok	Durango	24	+38.926	12	
14	15	(Portugal) Filipe Albuquerque	Racing Engineering	24	+40.083	15	
15	19	(China) Ho-Pin Tung	BCN Competición	24	+43.496	17	
16	10	(Turkey) Jason Tahincioglu	Petrol Ofisi FMS International	24	+52.194	19	
17	26	(Spain) Borja García	Durango	24	+55.437	20	
18	3	(Brazil) Alexandre Negrão	Minardi Piquet Sports	24	+57.342	24	
19	8	(South Africa) Adrian Zaugg	Arden International	24	+57.604	14	
20	21	(Spain) Andy Soucek	David Price Racing	24	+1:00.390	26	
21	20	(Denmark) Christian Bakkerud	David Price Racing	24	+1:03.276	25	
22	14	(Spain) Javier Villa	Racing Engineering	23	+1 lap	13	
Ret	12	(Japan) Kohei Hirate	Trident Racing	19	Did not finish	18	
Ret	5	(Germany) Timo Glock	iSport International	6	Did not finish	21	
Ret	18	(Japan) Sakon Yamamoto	BCN Competición	2	Did not finish	16	
DNS	23	(France) Nicolas Lapierre	DAMS	0	Did not start	22	

Previous round: 2007 Magny-Cours GP2 Series round	GP2 Series; 2007 season	Next round: 2007 Nürburgring GP2 Series round
Previous round: 2006 Silverstone GP2 Series round	Silverstone GP2 round	Next round: 2008 Silverstone GP2 Series round
