= 2007 Bahrain GP2 Series round =

Car racing competition

2007 Bahrain GP2 round
Round details
- Round 1 of 11 rounds in the 2007 GP2 Series
- Bahrain International Circuit
- Location: Bahrain International Circuit Sakhir, Bahrain
- Course: Permanent racing circuit 5.412 km (3.363 mi)

GP2 Series

Feature race
- Date: 14 April 2007
- Laps: 33

Pole position
Driver	(Italy) Luca Filippi	Super Nova International
- Time: 1:40.873

Podium
First	(Italy) Luca Filippi	Super Nova International
Second	(Germany) Timo Glock	iSport International
Third	(United Arab Emirates) Andreas Zuber	iSport International

Fastest lap
Driver	(Japan) Kazuki Nakajima	DAMS
- Time: 1:43.226 (on lap 27)

Sprint race
- Date: 15 April 2007
- Laps: 23

Podium
First	(France) Nicolas Lapierre	DAMS
Second	(Germany) Timo Glock	iSport International
Third	(Italy) Luca Filippi	Super Nova International

Fastest lap
Driver	(Germany) Timo Glock	iSport International
- Time: 1:44.172 (on lap 8)

The 2007 Bahrain GP2 Series round was a GP2 Series motor race held on April 14 and 15, 2007 at the Bahrain International Circuit in Sakhir, Bahrain. It was the first round of the 2007 GP2 Series season. The race weekend supported the 2007 Bahrain Grand Prix.

== Classification ==
=== Qualifying ===
Pos.	No.	Driver	Team	Time	Gap	Grid
1	16	(Italy) Luca Filippi	Super Nova International	1:40.873		1
2	3	(Brazil) Alexandre Negrão	Minardi Piquet Sports	1:40.958	+0.085	2
3	6	(United Arab Emirates) Andreas Zuber	iSport International	1:41.034	+0.161	3
4	2	(Brazil) Lucas di Grassi	ART Grand Prix	1:41.052	+0.179	4
5	7	(Brazil) Bruno Senna	Arden International	1:41.203	+0.330	5
6	12	(Japan) Kohei Hirate	Trident Racing	1:41.213	+0.340	6
7	5	(Germany) Timo Glock	iSport International	1:41.225	+0.352	7
8	26	(Spain) Borja García	Durango	1:41.252	+0.379	8
9	22	(Japan) Kazuki Nakajima	DAMS	1:41.306	+0.433	9
10	17	(United Kingdom) Mike Conway	Super Nova International	1:41.332	+0.459	10
11	23	(France) Nicolas Lapierre	DAMS	1:41.458	+0.585	11
12	9	(Brazil) Antônio Pizzonia	Petrol Ofisi FMS International	1:41.544	+0.671	12
13	25	(Italy) Giorgio Pantano	Campos Grand Prix	1:41.549	+0.676	13
14	8	(South Africa) Adrian Zaugg	Arden International	1:41.715	+0.842	14
15	1	(Germany) Michael Ammermüller	ART Grand Prix	1:41.746	+0.873	15
16	27	(India) Karun Chandhok	Durango	1:41.810	+0.937	16
17	4	(Spain) Roldán Rodríguez	Minardi Piquet Sports	1:41.951	+1.078	17
18	18	(Japan) Sakon Yamamoto	BCN Competición	1:42.139	+1.266	18
19	11	(Venezuela) Pastor Maldonado	Trident Racing	1:42.189	+1.316	19
20	10	(Turkey) Jason Tahinci	Petrol Ofisi FMS International	1:42.234	+1.361	20
21	14	(Spain) Javier Villa	Racing Engineering	1:42.255	+1.382	21
22	15	(Brazil) Sérgio Jimenez	Racing Engineering	1:42.492	+1.619	22
23	24	(Russia) Vitaly Petrov	Campos Grand Prix	1:42.561	+1.688	23
24	19	(China) Ho-Pin Tung	BCN Competición	1:43.001	+2.128	24
25	21	(Spain) Andy Soucek	DPR	1:43.257	+2.384	25
26	20	(Denmark) Christian Bakkerud	DPR	1:43.333	+2.460	26
107% time: 1:47.934

=== Feature race ===
Pos.	No.	Driver	Team	Laps	Time/Retired	Grid	Points
1	16	(Italy) Luca Filippi	Super Nova International	33	58:34.676	1	10+2
2	5	(Germany) Timo Glock	iSport International	33	+8.162	7	8
3	6	(United Arab Emirates) Andreas Zuber	iSport International	33	+11.903	3	6
4	7	(Brazil) Bruno Senna	Arden International	33	+16.373	5	5
5	2	(Brazil) Lucas di Grassi	ART Grand Prix	33	+18.074	4	4
6	8	(South Africa) Adrian Zaugg	Arden International	33	+39.135	14	3
7	23	(France) Nicolas Lapierre	DAMS	33	+39.462	11	2
8	26	(Spain) Borja García	Durango	33	+40.122	8	1
9	27	(India) Karun Chandhok	Durango	33	+43.505	16	
10	1	(Germany) Michael Ammermüller	ART Grand Prix	33	+51.883	15	
11	18	(Japan) Sakon Yamamoto	BCN Competición	33	+1:02.082	18	
12	21	(Spain) Andy Soucek	DPR	33	+1:04.142	25	
13	20	(Denmark) Christian Bakkerud	DPR	33	+1:04.409	26	
14	24	(Russia) Vitaly Petrov	Campos Grand Prix	33	+1:09.289	23	
15	19	(China) Ho-Pin Tung	BCN Competición	33	+1:12.116	24	
16	9	(Brazil) Antônio Pizzonia	Petrol Ofisi FMS International	32	+1 lap	12	
17	22	(Japan) Kazuki Nakajima	DAMS	32	+1 lap	9	1
18	12	(Japan) Kohei Hirate	Trident Racing	32	+1 lap	PL^{2}	
19^{3}	15	(Brazil) Sérgio Jimenez	Racing Engineering	31	+2 laps	PL^{2}	
Ret	3	(Brazil) Alexandre Negrão	Minardi Piquet Sports	14	Accident	2	
Ret	14	(Spain) Javier Villa	Racing Engineering	7	Engine	21	
Ret	10	(Turkey) Jason Tahinci	Petrol Ofisi FMS International	3	Gearbox	20	
Ret	4	(Spain) Roldán Rodríguez	Minardi Piquet Sports	1	Engine	17	
Ret	17	(United Kingdom) Mike Conway	Super Nova International	0	Gearbox	10	
DNS	25	(Italy) Giorgio Pantano	Campos Grand Prix	0	Clutch^{1}	13	
DNS	11	(Venezuela) Pastor Maldonado	Trident Racing	0	Gearbox^{1}	19	
Fastest lap: Kazuki Nakajima (DAMS) — 1:43.226 (on lap 27)

Notes

- ^1 – Giorgio Pantano and Pastor Maldonado were unable to start the race at the second start after they stalled during the original aborted start.
- ^2 – Kohei Hirate and Sérgio Jimenez were forced to start the race from the pit at the second start after they stalled during the original aborted start.
- ^3 – Sérgio Jimenez was classified as he completed more than 90% of the race distance.

=== Sprint race ===
Pos.	No.	Driver	Team	Laps	Time/Retired	Grid	Points
1	23	(France) Nicolas Lapierre	DAMS	23	43:30.252	2	6
2	5	(Germany) Timo Glock	iSport International	23	+3.183	7	5+1
3	16	(Italy) Luca Filippi	Super Nova International	23	+6.686	8	4
4	26	(Spain) Borja García	Durango	23	+8.416	1	3
5	17	(United Kingdom) Mike Conway	Super Nova International	23	+10.178	24	2
6	22	(Japan) Kazuki Nakajima	DAMS	23	+11.089	17	1
7	1	(Germany) Michael Ammermüller	ART Grand Prix	23	+12.259	10	
8	7	(Brazil) Bruno Senna	Arden International	23	+22.427	5	
9	21	(Spain) Andy Soucek	DPR	23	+25.857	12	
10	14	(Spain) Javier Villa	Racing Engineering	23	+26.720	21	
11	24	(Russia) Vitaly Petrov	Campos Grand Prix	23	+32.661	14	
12	4	(Spain) Roldán Rodríguez	Minardi Piquet Sports	23	+38.977	23	
13	10	(Turkey) Jason Tahinci	Petrol Ofisi FMS International	23	+46.473	22	
14	18	(Japan) Sakon Yamamoto	BCN Competición	23	+1:17.896	11	
15	3	(Brazil) Alexandre Negrão	Minardi Piquet Sports	22	+1 lap	20	
16^{4}	11	(Venezuela) Pastor Maldonado	Trident Racing	21	+2 laps	26	
17	8	(South Africa) Adrian Zaugg	Arden International	20	+3 laps	3	
Ret	25	(Italy) Giorgio Pantano	Campos Grand Prix	15	Gearbox	25	
Ret	12	(Japan) Kohei Hirate	Trident Racing	12	Accident	18	
Ret	15	(Brazil) Sérgio Jimenez	Racing Engineering	10	Engine	19	
Ret	27	(India) Karun Chandhok	Durango	7	Spin	9	
Ret	19	(China) Ho-Pin Tung	BCN Competición	3	Accident	15	
Ret	9	(Brazil) Antônio Pizzonia	Petrol Ofisi FMS International	2	Accident	16	
Ret	2	(Brazil) Lucas di Grassi	ART Grand Prix	0	Accident	4	
Ret	6	(United Arab Emirates) Andreas Zuber	iSport International	0	Accident	6	
Ret	20	(Denmark) Christian Bakkerud	DPR	0	Accident	13	
Fastest lap: Timo Glock (iSport International) — 1:44.172 (on lap 8)

Notes

- ^4 – Pastor Maldonado was classified as he completed more than 90% of the race distance.

== Standings after the round ==
Drivers' Championship standings

Pos	Driver	Points
1	(Italy) Luca Filippi	16
2	(Germany) Timo Glock	14
3	(France) Nicolas Lapierre	8
4	(United Arab Emirates) Andreas Zuber	6
5	(Brazil) Bruno Senna	5

Teams' Championship standings

Pos	Team	Points
1	(United Kingdom) iSport International	20
2	(United Kingdom) Super Nova International	18
3	(France) DAMS	10
4	(Netherlands) Arden International	8
5	(France) ART Grand Prix	4

- Note: Only the top five positions are included for both sets of standings.

Previous round: 2006 Monza GP2 Series round	GP2 Series; 2007 season	Next round: 2007 Catalunya GP2 Series round
Previous round: 2005 Bahrain GP2 Series round	Bahrain GP2 round	Next round: 2008 Bahrain GP2 Asia Series round
