= 2007 Magny-Cours GP2 Series round =

(France) 2007 Magny-Cours GP2 round
Round details
- Round 4 of 11 rounds in the 2007 GP2 Series
- Location: Magny-Cours, France
- Course: Permanent racing facility 4.411 km (2.74 mi)

GP2 Series

Feature race
- Date: 30 June 2007
- Laps: 41

Pole position
Driver	(Germany) Timo Glock	iSport International
- Time: 1:21.895

Podium
First	(Italy) Giorgio Pantano	Campos Grand Prix
Second	(Brazil) Lucas di Grassi	ART Grand Prix
Third	(Brazil) Bruno Senna	Arden International

Fastest lap
Driver	(Spain) Roldán Rodríguez	Minardi Piquet Sports
- Time: 1:23.405 (on lap 39)

Sprint race
- Date: 1 July 2007
- Laps: 28

Podium
First	(Spain) Javier Villa	Racing Engineering
Second	(Italy) Luca Filippi	Super Nova Racing
Third	(Italy) Giorgio Pantano	Campos Grand Prix

Fastest lap
Driver	(Germany) Michael Ammermüller	ART Grand Prix
- Time: 1:23.614

2007 Magny-Cours GP2 Series round was a GP2 Series motor race held on June 30 and July 1, 2007, at the Circuit de Nevers Magny-Cours in Magny-Cours, France. It was the fourth race of the 2007 GP2 Series season. The race was used to support the 2007 French Grand Prix.

== Classification ==
=== Qualifying ===
Pos.	No.	Driver	Team	Time	Grid
1	5	(Germany) Timo Glock	iSport International	1:21.895	1
2	6	(United Arab Emirates) Andreas Zuber	iSport International	1:21.997	2
3	7	(Brazil) Bruno Senna	Arden International	1:22.255	3
4	2	(Brazil) Lucas di Grassi	ART Grand Prix	1:22.295	4
5	25	(Italy) Giorgio Pantano	Campos Grand Prix	1:22.441	5
6	4	(Spain) Roldán Rodríguez	Minardi Piquet Sports	1:22.536	6
7	11	(Venezuela) Pastor Maldonado	Trident Racing	1:22.551	7
8	8	(South Africa) Adrian Zaugg	Arden International	1:22.722	8
9	22	(Japan) Kazuki Nakajima	DAMS	1:22.756	9
10	23	(France) Nicolas Lapierre	DAMS	1:22.758	10
11	17	(United Kingdom) Mike Conway	Super Nova Racing	1:22.796	11
12	1	(Germany) Michael Ammermüller	ART Grand Prix	1:22.798	12
13	14	(Spain) Javier Villa	Racing Engineering	1:22.809	13
14	9	(United Kingdom) Adam Carroll	Petrol Ofisi FMS International	1:22.827	14
15	3	(Brazil) Alexandre Negrão	Minardi Piquet Sports	1:22.895	15
16	16	(Italy) Luca Filippi	Super Nova Racing	1:22.932	16
17	24	(Russia) Vitaly Petrov	Campos Grand Prix	1:22.957	17
18	21	(Spain) Andy Soucek	David Price Racing	1:23.011	26
19	15	(Venezuela) Ernesto Viso	Racing Engineering	1:23.028	18
20	26	(Spain) Borja García	Durango	1:23.031	19
21	18	(Japan) Sakon Yamamoto	BCN Competición	1:23.031	20
22	12	(Japan) Kohei Hirate	Trident Racing	1:23.461	21
23	27	(India) Karun Chandhok	Durango	1:23.518	22
24	19	(China) Ho-Pin Tung	BCN Competición	1:23.692	23
25	20	(Denmark) Christian Bakkerud	David Price Racing	1:23.922	24
26	10	(Turkey) Jason Tahincioglu	Petrol Ofisi FMS International	1:24.154	25

=== Feature race ===
Pos.	No.	Driver	Team	Laps	Time/Retired	Grid	Points
1	25	(Italy) Giorgio Pantano	Campos Grand Prix	41	1:52:32.513	5	10
2	2	(Brazil) Lucas di Grassi	ART Grand Prix	41	+8.777	4	8
3	7	(Brazil) Bruno Senna	Arden International	41	+22.476	3	6
4	16	(Italy) Luca Filippi	Super Nova Racing	41	+24.585	16	5
5	24	(Russia) Vitaly Petrov	Campos Grand Prix	41	+40.162	17	4
6	8	(South Africa) Adrian Zaugg	Arden International	41	+40.699	8	3
7	14	(Spain) Javier Villa	Racing Engineering	41	+41.206	13	2
8	23	(France) Nicolas Lapierre	DAMS	41	+48.246	10	1
9	17	(United Kingdom) Mike Conway	Super Nova Racing	41	+52.431	11	
10	11	(Venezuela) Pastor Maldonado	Trident Racing	41	+55.890	7	
11	18	(Japan) Sakon Yamamoto	BCN Competición	41	+59.032	20	
12	21	(Spain) Andy Soucek	David Price Racing	41	+1:04.692	26	
13	19	(China) Ho-Pin Tung	BCN Competición	41	+1:08.394	23	
14	26	(Spain) Borja García	Durango	41	+1:26.960	19	
15	10	(Turkey) Jason Tahincioglu	Petrol Ofisi FMS International	41	+1:27.103	25	
16	4	(Spain) Roldán Rodríguez	Minardi Piquet Sports	40	+1 lap	6	1
17	22	(Japan) Kazuki Nakajima	DAMS	40	+1 lap	9	
Ret	3	(Brazil) Alexandre Negrão	Minardi Piquet Sports	31	Did not finish	15	
Ret	12	(Japan) Kohei Hirate	Trident Racing	31	Did not finish	21	
Ret	20	(Denmark) Christian Bakkerud	David Price Racing	18	Did not finish	24	
Ret	27	(India) Karun Chandhok	Durango	6	Accident	22	
Ret	5	(Germany) Timo Glock	iSport International	0	Accident	1	2
Ret	6	(United Arab Emirates) Andreas Zuber	iSport International	0	Accident	2	
Ret	1	(Germany) Michael Ammermüller	ART Grand Prix	0	Accident	12	
Ret	15	(Venezuela) Ernesto Viso	Racing Engineering	0	Accident	18	
DSQ	9	(United Kingdom) Adam Carroll	Petrol Ofisi FMS International	0	Disqualified	14	

=== Sprint race ===
Pos.	No.	Driver	Team	Laps	Time/Retired	Grid	Points
1	14	(Spain) Javier Villa	Racing Engineering	28	39:46.184	2	6
2	16	(Italy) Luca Filippi	Super Nova Racing	28	+0.603	5	5
3	25	(Italy) Giorgio Pantano	Campos Grand Prix	28	+1.262	8	4
4	2	(Brazil) Lucas di Grassi	ART Grand Prix	28	+15.312	7	3
5	24	(Russia) Vitaly Petrov	Campos Grand Prix	28	+20.134	4	2
6	22	(Japan) Kazuki Nakajima	DAMS	28	+20.520	17	1
7	7	(Brazil) Bruno Senna	Arden International	28	+25.895	6	
8	11	(Venezuela) Pastor Maldonado	Trident Racing	28	+28.622	10	
9	4	(Spain) Roldán Rodríguez	Minardi Piquet Sports	28	+34.408	16	
10	21	(Spain) Andy Soucek	David Price Racing	28	+35.711	12	
11	12	(Japan) Kohei Hirate	Trident Racing	28	+38.952	19	
12	20	(Denmark) Christian Bakkerud	David Price Racing	28	+40.721	20	
13	18	(Japan) Sakon Yamamoto	BCN Competición	28	+43.611	11	
14	9	(United Kingdom) Adam Carroll	Petrol Ofisi FMS International	28	+44.249	25	
15	6	(United Arab Emirates) Andreas Zuber	iSport International	28	+44.599	23	
16	27	(India) Karun Chandhok	Durango	28	+47.262	21	
17	19	(China) Ho-Pin Tung	BCN Competición	28	+51.201	13	
18	10	(Turkey) Jason Tahincioglu	Petrol Ofisi FMS International	28	+1:19.194	15	
19	1	(Germany) Michael Ammermüller	ART Grand Prix	27	+1 lap	24	1
20	26	(Spain) Borja García	Durango	26	+2 laps	14	
Ret	17	(United Kingdom) Mike Conway	Super Nova Racing	20	Did not finish	9	
Ret	23	(France) Nicolas Lapierre	DAMS	16	Did not finish	1	
Ret	3	(Brazil) Alexandre Negrão	Minardi Piquet Sports	9	Did not finish	18	
Ret	5	(Germany) Timo Glock	iSport International	3	Did not finish	22	
Ret	8	(South Africa) Adrian Zaugg	Arden International	1	Did not finish	3	
DNS	15	(Venezuela) Ernesto Viso	Racing Engineering	0	Did not start	26	

Previous round: 2007 Monaco GP2 Series round	GP2 Series; 2007 season	Next round: 2007 Silverstone GP2 Series round
Previous round: 2006 Magny-Cours GP2 Series round	Magny-Cours GP2 round	Next round: 2008 Magny-Cours GP2 Series round
