= 2007 GP2 Series =

Sports season

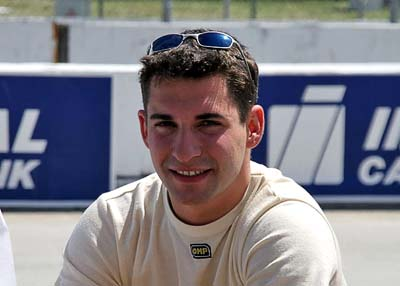
Timo Glock won the championship.

The 2007 GP2 Series season was the forty-first season of the second-tier of Formula One feeder championship and also third season under the GP2 Series moniker. The series began on 14 April at Bahrain. Timo Glock was crowned series champion on 30 September after winning the final round at Valencia, with Brazilian Lucas di Grassi finishing second.

== Season summary ==
The season started in Bahrain. Luca Filippi started the season with win from pole, while Nicolas Lapierre took his first GP2 win in his third season in the sprint race. One of pre-season favourites, Timo Glock finished 2nd in both races. Michael Ammermüller, who was driving for defending teams' champion ART Grand Prix was injured and missed next two races.

Next event started with big start crash involving several drivers, including series leader Filippi. Safety car was instantly deployed and majority of the field opted to make their mandatory pit stop. Glock wasn't one of those and he lost his chances to win the race as a result. Bruno Senna took his first GP2 victory in his third race. Glock finally got his first win of the season after three second places in the sprint.

At Monaco, only one race was held which was won by Pastor Maldonado who had celebrated a victory in World Series there in the previous year. Glock increased his podium streak to five races after finishing 3rd.

Two drivers made their comeback to GP2 in Magny-Cours. Adam Carroll replaced underperforming Antônio Pizzonia while Ernesto Viso replaced Sérgio Jimenez.

Glock took pole position in Magny-Cours but the race started difficult time for him. He crashed with his teammate Andreas Zuber who started second, just a few metres after the start. Later on the first lap, Viso had massive shunt in which his car turned over and flew over the concrete barrier. Viso was lucky not to suffer serious injuries. The race was eventually won by a veteran Giorgio Pantano, giving Campos Racing its first victory in GP2. Viso's teammate Javier Villa won the sprint race, becoming youngest ever winner in GP2 at that time (the record was broken a year later by Sébastien Buemi).

Glock failed to finish both Silverstone races as well. Zuber won the feature race while Carroll took the sprint, making it nine winners in nine races. More amazingly, they were divided to eight different teams: only iSport International had two drivers who had won a race at this point.

Glock rebounded to take feature race victory at his home soil in Nürburgring. Sprint race was won by Villa. Glock was also on pole in Hungaroring but failed to score after mistake during the race. Hungaroring race was won by Carroll who leap-frogged several positions with well-timed pit stop during the safety car, as those who had made their stops already had to use start/finish straight which had a lot of debris on it. Villa was again victorious in sprint race, with Carroll taking 2nd. Despite starting later in the season, he was en route to good position in the championship.

At Istanbul, Lucas di Grassi, who had finished in the points in every race except one at that point, took his first victory of the season. Glock won the sprint race, so he eventually got more points than di Grassi while these two were battling for the championship.

At Monza, Pantano won the feature race and Glock the sprint. di Grassi failed to get podium after car troubles at the end of the feature race. Pantano, meanwhile, was disqualified in the sprint race after driving several laps with broken front wing.

At Spa, Glock stalled at the start and finished the race in 17th position. Lapierre was the eventual winner. Glock then collided with Ricardo Risatti during reconnaissance lap of the sprint race and failed to start. di Grassi got good chance to close the gap on him but couldn't do better than third in a race which was won by the Indian Karun Chandhok.

The final race was held in Valencia and that was only race of the season which was not supporting F1. Glock started the weekend two points ahead of di Grassi. The feature race started on damp track. Tyre choice was crucial. The best drivers started on intermediates and then quite soon moved to slicks as the mandatory pit window had opened. The gaps in the race were exceptionally big, only five drivers finished in the same lap with the winner Vitaly Petrov. Glock was seventh while di Grassi spun off on damp track, just after switching to slicks. Glock got to start from the front row in the sprint race while di Grassi's place was near the back of the grid. Glock confirmed his championship with the victory in the final race, 11 points ahead of di Grassi. Pantano finished third in the series on countback ahead of Filippi.

== Teams and drivers ==
All of the teams used the Dallara GP2/05 chassis with Renault-badged 4.0 litre (244 cu in) naturally-aspirated Mecachrome V8 engines order and with tyres supplied by Bridgestone.

Team	No.	Driver name	Rounds
(France) ART Grand Prix	1	(Germany) Michael Ammermüller	1, 4–5
(France) ART Grand Prix	1	(Russia) Mikhail Aleshin	2, 11
(France) ART Grand Prix	1	(Switzerland) Sébastien Buemi	3, 6–10
(France) ART Grand Prix	2	(Brazil) Lucas di Grassi	All
(Brazil) Minardi Piquet Sports	3	(Brazil) Alexandre Negrão	All
(Brazil) Minardi Piquet Sports	4	(Spain) Roldán Rodríguez	All
(United Kingdom) iSport International	5	(Germany) Timo Glock	All
(United Kingdom) iSport International	6	(United Arab Emirates) Andreas Zuber (Note: Zuber is an Austrian driver who competed under an Emirati racing licence.)	All
(Netherlands) Arden International (Note: Arden International competed under a Dutch licence.)	7	(Brazil) Bruno Senna	All
(Netherlands) Arden International	8	(South Africa) Adrian Zaugg	1–10
(Netherlands) Arden International	8	(Portugal) Filipe Albuquerque	11
(Italy) Petrol Ofisi FMS International	9	(Brazil) Antônio Pizzonia	1–3
(Italy) Petrol Ofisi FMS International	9	(United Kingdom) Adam Carroll	4–11
(Italy) Petrol Ofisi FMS International	10	(Turkey) Jason Tahinci	All
(Italy) Trident Racing	11	(Venezuela) Pastor Maldonado	1–7
(Italy) Trident Racing	11	(Argentina) Ricardo Risatti	8–10
(Italy) Trident Racing	11	(Spain) Sergio Hernández	11
(Italy) Trident Racing	12	(Japan) Kohei Hirate	All
(Spain) Racing Engineering	14	(Spain) Javier Villa	All
(Spain) Racing Engineering	15	(Brazil) Sérgio Jimenez	1–3
(Spain) Racing Engineering	15	(Venezuela) Ernesto Viso	4, 6
(Spain) Racing Engineering	15	(Portugal) Filipe Albuquerque	5
(Spain) Racing Engineering	15	(Spain) Marcos Martinez	7–11
(United Kingdom) Super Nova International	16	(Italy) Luca Filippi	All
(United Kingdom) Super Nova International	17	(United Kingdom) Mike Conway	All
(Spain) BCN Competición	18	(Japan) Sakon Yamamoto	1–6
(Spain) BCN Competición	18	(Finland) Markus Niemelä	7, 9–11
(Spain) BCN Competición	18	(Finland) Henri Karjalainen	8
(Spain) BCN Competición	19	(China) Ho-Pin Tung	All
(United Kingdom) DPR	20	(Denmark) Christian Bakkerud	1–8, 10–11
(United Kingdom) DPR	20	(France) Olivier Pla	9
(United Kingdom) DPR	21	(Spain) Andy Soucek	All
(France) DAMS	22	(Japan) Kazuki Nakajima	All
(France) DAMS	23	(France) Nicolas Lapierre	All
(Spain) Campos Grand Prix	24	(Russia) Vitaly Petrov	All
(Spain) Campos Grand Prix	25	(Italy) Giorgio Pantano	All
(Italy) Durango	26	(Spain) Borja García	All
(Italy) Durango	27	(India) Karun Chandhok	All

== Calendar ==
Round		Location	Circuit	Date	Time		Tyres (Note: Bridgestone supplied only one dry compound to the teams to be used throughout the race weekend.)	Supporting
Round		Location	Circuit	Date	Local	UTC	Tyres	Supporting
1	F	Sakhir, Bahrain	Bahrain International Circuit	14 April	16:00	13:00	Medium	Bahrain Grand Prix
1	S	Sakhir, Bahrain	Bahrain International Circuit	15 April	10:30	07:30	Medium	Bahrain Grand Prix
2	F	Montmeló, Spain	Circuit de Catalunya	12 May	16:00	14:00	Hard	Spanish Grand Prix
2	S	Montmeló, Spain	Circuit de Catalunya	13 May	10:00	08:00	Hard	Spanish Grand Prix
3	F	Monte Carlo, Monaco	Circuit de Monaco	26 May	16:00	14:00	Soft	Monaco Grand Prix
4	F	Magny-Cours, France	Circuit de Nevers Magny-Cours	30 June	16:00	14:00	Medium	French Grand Prix
4	S	Magny-Cours, France	Circuit de Nevers Magny-Cours	1 July	10:00	08:00	Medium	French Grand Prix
5	F	(United Kingdom) Silverstone, Great Britain	Silverstone Circuit	7 July	15:00	14:00	Hard	British Grand Prix
5	S	(United Kingdom) Silverstone, Great Britain	Silverstone Circuit	8 July	09:00	08:00	Hard	British Grand Prix
6	F	Nürburg, Germany	Nürburgring	21 July	16:00	14:00	Medium	European Grand Prix
6	S	Nürburg, Germany	Nürburgring	22 July	10:00	08:00	Medium	European Grand Prix
7	F	Mogyoród, Hungary	Hungaroring	4 August	16:00	14:00	Medium	Hungarian Grand Prix
7	S	Mogyoród, Hungary	Hungaroring	5 August	10:00	08:00	Medium	Hungarian Grand Prix
8	F	Istanbul, Turkey	Istanbul Park	25 August	16:00	13:00	Hard	Turkish Grand Prix
8	S	Istanbul, Turkey	Istanbul Park	26 August	11:00	08:00	Hard	Turkish Grand Prix
9	F	Monza, Italy	Autodromo Nazionale Monza	8 September	16:00	14:00	Hard	Italian Grand Prix
9	S	Monza, Italy	Autodromo Nazionale Monza	9 September	10:00	08:00	Hard	Italian Grand Prix
10	F	Stavelot, Belgium	Circuit de Spa-Francorchamps	15 September	16:00	14:00	Medium	Belgian Grand Prix
10	S	Stavelot, Belgium	Circuit de Spa-Francorchamps	16 September	10:00	08:00	Medium	Belgian Grand Prix
11	F	Valencia, Spain	Circuit de Valencia	29 September	16:00	14:00	Medium	Spanish F3 Championship; Spanish GT Championship
11	S	Valencia, Spain	Circuit de Valencia	30 September	12:00	10:00	Medium	Spanish F3 Championship; Spanish GT Championship

== Results ==
Round		Circuit	Pole position	Fastest lap	Winning driver	Winning team	Report
1	F	Bahrain International Circuit	(Italy) Luca Filippi	(Japan) Kazuki Nakajima	(Italy) Luca Filippi	(United Kingdom) Super Nova International	Report
1	S	Bahrain International Circuit		(Germany) Timo Glock	(France) Nicolas Lapierre	(France) DAMS	Report
2	F	(Spain) Circuit de Catalunya	(Germany) Timo Glock	(Japan) Kazuki Nakajima	(Brazil) Bruno Senna	(Netherlands) Arden International	Report
2	S	(Spain) Circuit de Catalunya		(Germany) Timo Glock	(Germany) Timo Glock	(United Kingdom) iSport International	Report
3	F	Circuit de Monaco	(Venezuela) Pastor Maldonado	(Brazil) Alexandre Negrão	(Venezuela) Pastor Maldonado	(Italy) Trident Racing	Report
4	F	(France) Circuit de Nevers Magny-Cours	(Germany) Timo Glock	(Spain) Roldán Rodríguez	(Italy) Giorgio Pantano	(Spain) Campos Grand Prix	Report
4	S	(France) Circuit de Nevers Magny-Cours		(United Arab Emirates) Andreas Zuber (Note: Andreas Zuber set the fastest lap, but he started from the pitlane, so the point was given to Michael Ammermüller.)	(Spain) Javier Villa	(Spain) Racing Engineering	Report
5	F	(United Kingdom) Silverstone Circuit	(United Arab Emirates) Andreas Zuber	(Germany) Timo Glock (Note: Timo Glock set the fastest lap, but haven't finished the race, so the point was given to Andreas Zuber.)	(United Arab Emirates) Andreas Zuber	(United Kingdom) iSport International	Report
5	S	(United Kingdom) Silverstone Circuit		(Japan) Kazuki Nakajima	(United Kingdom) Adam Carroll	(Italy) Petrol Ofisi FMS International	Report
6	F	(Germany) Nürburgring	(Germany) Timo Glock	(United Kingdom) Mike Conway	(Germany) Timo Glock	(United Kingdom) iSport International	Report
6	S	(Germany) Nürburgring		(Switzerland) Sébastien Buemi	(Spain) Javier Villa	(Spain) Racing Engineering	Report
7	F	(Hungary) Hungaroring	(Germany) Timo Glock	(Switzerland) Sébastien Buemi (Note: Sébastien Buemi set the fastest lap, but he started from the pitlane, so the points were given to Karun Chandhok.)	(United Kingdom) Adam Carroll	(Italy) Petrol Ofisi FMS International	Report
7	S	(Hungary) Hungaroring		(Switzerland) Sébastien Buemi	(Spain) Javier Villa	(Spain) Racing Engineering	Report
8	F	(Turkey) Istanbul Park	(Italy) Luca Filippi	(France) Nicolas Lapierre	(Brazil) Lucas di Grassi	(France) ART Grand Prix	Report
8	S	(Turkey) Istanbul Park		(United Arab Emirates) Andreas Zuber	(Germany) Timo Glock	(United Kingdom) iSport International	Report
9	F	(Italy) Autodromo Nazionale Monza	(Italy) Giorgio Pantano	(Italy) Giorgio Pantano	(Italy) Giorgio Pantano	(Spain) Campos Grand Prix	Report
9	S	(Italy) Autodromo Nazionale Monza		(United Kingdom) Adam Carroll	(Germany) Timo Glock	(United Kingdom) iSport International	Report
10	F	(Belgium) Circuit de Spa-Francorchamps	(France) Nicolas Lapierre	(Germany) Timo Glock	(France) Nicolas Lapierre	(France) DAMS	Report
10	S	(Belgium) Circuit de Spa-Francorchamps		(France) Nicolas Lapierre	(India) Karun Chandhok	(Italy) Durango	Report
11	F	(Spain) Circuit de Valencia	(Japan) Kazuki Nakajima	(India) Karun Chandhok	(Russia) Vitaly Petrov	(Spain) Campos Grand Prix	Report
11	S	(Spain) Circuit de Valencia		(Germany) Timo Glock	(Germany) Timo Glock	(United Kingdom) iSport International	Report

== Championship standings ==
Scoring system

Points are awarded to the top 8 classified finishers in the Feature race, and to the top 6 classified finishers in the Sprint race. The pole-sitter in the feature race will also receive two points, and one point is given to the driver who set the fastest lap in the feature and sprint races. The driver also had to start the race from his allocated grid position to be eligible to claim the fastest lap and has to drive 90% of race laps. No extra points are awarded to the pole-sitter in the sprint race.

Feature race points

Position	**1st**	**2nd**	**3rd**	**4th**	**5th**	**6th**	**7th**	**8th**	**Pole**	**FL**
Points	10	8	6	5	4	3	2	1	2	1

Sprint race points

Points are awarded to the top 6 classified finishers.

Position	**1st**	**2nd**	**3rd**	**4th**	**5th**	**6th**	**FL**
Points	6	5	4	3	2	1	1

=== Drivers' Championship ===
Pos	Driver	BHR (Bahrain)		CAT (Spain)		MON (Monaco)	MAG (France)		SIL (United Kingdom)		NÜR (Germany)		HUN (Hungary)		IST (Turkey)		MNZ (Italy)		SPA (Belgium)		VAL (Spain)		Points
1	(Germany) Timo Glock	2	2	**2**	1	3	**Ret**	Ret	Ret	Ret	**1**	5	**10**	Ret	4	1	3	1	17	DNS	7	1	88
2	(Brazil) Lucas di Grassi	5	Ret	3	3	5	2	4	4	4	2	6	4	4	1	11	13	4	3	3	Ret	13	77
3	(Italy) Giorgio Pantano	DNS	Ret	Ret	6	2	1	3	Ret	8	4	7	Ret	7	2	12	**1**	DSQ	Ret	14	2	5	59
4	(Italy) Luca Filippi	**1**	3	Ret	11	4	4	2	5	7	Ret	Ret	Ret	16	**Ret**	7	2	2	2	7	18^{†}	6	59
5	(Japan) Kazuki Nakajima	17	6	15	7	10	17	6	3	3	3	3	2	Ret	6	Ret	DSQ	18	Ret	9	**3**	7	44
6	(Spain) Javier Villa	Ret	10	8	2	Ret	7	1	13	22^{†}	8	1	8	1	12	Ret	6	Ret	4	15	8	2	42
7	(United Kingdom) Adam Carroll						DSQ	14	6	1	Ret	14	1	2	3	3	Ret	15	Ret	6	Ret	15	36
8	(Brazil) Bruno Senna	4	8	1	4	11	3	7	11	10	15	Ret	13	12	10	6	4	3	Ret	8	Ret	14	34
9	(United Arab Emirates) Andreas Zuber	3	Ret	DNS	9	Ret	Ret	15	**1**	6	Ret	21	3	6	Ret	14	Ret	5	18	12	12	12	30
10	(Spain) Borja García	8	4	5	14	16^{†}	14	20^{†}	20^{†}	17	19	12	5	5	5	4	Ret	19	16	17	5	4	28
11	(Venezuela) Pastor Maldonado	DNS	16^{†}	Ret	17^{†}	**1**	10	8	7	2	6	4	Ret	Ret									25
12	(France) Nicolas Lapierre	7	1	Ret	DNS	Ret	8	Ret	Ret	DNS	9	Ret	Ret	14	15	Ret	10	17^{†}	**1**	21	Ret	21	23
13	(Russia) Vitaly Petrov	14	11	10	16^{†}	6	5	5	9	9	11	17	Ret	9	17	5	12	12	9	11	1	8	21
14	(United Kingdom) Mike Conway	Ret	5	Ret	12	Ret	9	Ret	2	5	18	15	Ret	8	Ret	Ret	Ret	9	5	5	16	9	19
15	(India) Karun Chandhok	9	Ret	Ret	15	Ret	Ret	16	12	13	Ret	16	14	15^{†}	8	Ret	5	6	7	1	17	Ret	16
16	(Spain) Andy Soucek	12	9	14	Ret	14	12	10	Ret	20	Ret	13	12	Ret	Ret	Ret	Ret	7	6	2	6	3	15
17	(Spain) Roldán Rodríguez	Ret	12	4	Ret	Ret	16	9	8	11	10	9	6	3	11	8	Ret	8	15	10	Ret	17	14
18	(South Africa) Adrian Zaugg	6	17	Ret	13	9	6	Ret	14	19	7	Ret	7	Ret	Ret	15^{†}	Ret	Ret	13	19			10
19	(Japan) Kohei Hirate	18	Ret	13	10	12	Ret	11	18	Ret	5	2	11	10	Ret	Ret	Ret	10	Ret	13	Ret	16	9
20	(Brazil) Alexandre Negrão	Ret	15	Ret	DNS	15	Ret	Ret	Ret	18	12	10	Ret	13	7	2	14	Ret	19^{†}	16	15	18	8
21	(Switzerland) Sébastien Buemi					7					Ret	20	15	17	Ret	13	7	14	10	Ret			6
22	(Spain) Marcos Martínez												DNQ	DNQ	13	Ret	Ret	Ret	Ret	Ret	4	22	5
23	(China) Ho-Pin Tung	15	Ret	11	Ret	13	13	17	17	15	16	22^{†}	9	Ret	9	9	Ret	16^{†}	8	4	11	11	4
24	(Brazil) Sérgio Jimenez	19^{†}	Ret	7	5	17^{†}																	4
25	(Russia) Mikhail Aleshin			6	Ret																9	20	3
26	(Germany) Michael Ammermüller	10	7				Ret	19	10	12													1
27	(Brazil) Antônio Pizzonia	16	Ret	Ret	8	8																	1
28	(Argentina) Ricardo Risatti														16	10	8	Ret	20^{†}	18			1
29	(Venezuela) Ernesto Viso						Ret	DNS			14	8											0
30	(Japan) Sakon Yamamoto	11	14	9	18^{†}	Ret	11	13	16	Ret	13	11											0
31	(Finland) Markus Niemelä												Ret	DNS			9	11	11	Ret	14	Ret	0
32	(Portugal) Filipe Albuquerque								15	14											10	10	0
33	(Turkey) Jason Tahinci	Ret	13	DNS	Ret	Ret	15	18	19	16	17^{†}	19	Ret	11	14	Ret	11	20	14	20	13	Ret	0
34	(Denmark) Christian Bakkerud	13	Ret	12	Ret	Ret	Ret	12	Ret	21	Ret	18	Ret	DNS	DNS	DNS			12	Ret	Ret	Ret	0
35	(France) Olivier Pla																Ret	13					0
36	(Spain) Sergio Hernández																				Ret	19	0
	(Finland) Henri Karjalainen														Ret	Ret							0
Pos	Driver	BHR (Bahrain)		CAT (Spain)		MON (Monaco)	MAG (France)		SIL (United Kingdom)		NÜR (Germany)		HUN (Hungary)		IST (Turkey)		MNZ (Italy)		SPA (Belgium)		VAL (Spain)		Points

Key
Colour	Result
Gold	Winner
Silver	2nd place
Bronze	3rd place
Green	Other points position
Blue	Other classified position
Blue	Not classified, finished (NC)
Purple	Not classified, retired (Ret)
Red	Did not qualify (DNQ)
Red	Did not pre-qualify (DNPQ)
Black	Disqualified (DSQ)
White	Did not start (DNS)
White	Race cancelled (C)
Blank	Did not practice (DNP)
Blank	Excluded (EX)
Blank	Did not arrive (DNA)
Blank	Withdrawn (WD)
Text formatting	Meaning
**Bold**	Pole position point(s)
Italics	Fastest lap point(s)

Notes:

- † – Drivers did not finish the race, but were classified as they completed more than 90% of the race distance.

=== Teams' Championship ===
Pos	Team	Car No.	BHR (Bahrain)		CAT (Spain)		MON (Monaco)	MAG (France)		SIL (United Kingdom)		NÜR (Germany)		HUN (Hungary)		IST (Turkey)		MNZ (Italy)		SPA (Belgium)		VAL (Spain)		Points
1	(United Kingdom) iSport International	5	2	2	**2**	1	3	**Ret**	Ret	Ret	Ret	**1**	5	**10**	Ret	4	1	3	1	17	DNS	7	1	118
1	(United Kingdom) iSport International	6	3	Ret	DNS	9	Ret	Ret	15	**1**	6	Ret	21	3	6	Ret	14	Ret	5	18	12	12	12	118
2	(France) ART Grand Prix	1	10	7	6	Ret	7	Ret	19	10	12	Ret	20	15	17	Ret	13	7	14	10	Ret	9	20	87
2	(France) ART Grand Prix	2	5	Ret	3	3	5	2	4	4	4	2	6	4	4	1	11	13	4	3	3	Ret	13	87
3	(Spain) Campos Grand Prix	24	14	11	10	16^{†}	6	5	5	9	9	11	17	Ret	9	17	5	12	12	9	11	1	8	80
3	(Spain) Campos Grand Prix	25	DNS	Ret	Ret	6	2	1	3	Ret	8	4	7	Ret	7	2	12	**1**	DSQ	Ret	14	2	5	80
4	(United Kingdom) Super Nova International	16	**1**	3	Ret	11	4	4	2	5	7	Ret	Ret	Ret	16	**Ret**	7	2	2	2	7	18^{†}	6	78
4	(United Kingdom) Super Nova International	17	Ret	5	Ret	12	Ret	9	Ret	2	5	18	15	Ret	8	Ret	Ret	Ret	9	5	5	16	9	78
5	(France) DAMS	22	17	6	15	7	10	17	6	3	3	3	3	2	Ret	6	Ret	DSQ	18	Ret	9	**3**	7	67
5	(France) DAMS	23	7	1	Ret	DNS	Ret	8	Ret	Ret	DNS	9	Ret	Ret	14	15	Ret	10	17^{†}	**1**	21	Ret	21	67
6	(Spain) Racing Engineering	14	Ret	10	8	2	Ret	7	1	13	22^{†}	8	1	8	1	12	Ret	6	Ret	4	15	8	2	51
6	(Spain) Racing Engineering	15	19^{†}	Ret	7	5	17^{†}	Ret	DNS	15	14	14	8	DNQ	DNQ	13	Ret	Ret	Ret	Ret	Ret	4	22	51
7	(Netherlands) Arden International	7	4	8	1	4	11	3	7	11	10	15	Ret	13	12	10	6	4	3	Ret	8	Ret	14	44
7	(Netherlands) Arden International	8	6	17	Ret	13	9	6	Ret	14	19	7	Ret	7	Ret	Ret	15^{†}	Ret	Ret	13	19	10	10	44
8	(Italy) Durango	26	8	4	5	14	16^{†}	14	20^{†}	20^{†}	17	19	12	5	5	5	4	Ret	19	16	17	5	4	44
8	(Italy) Durango	27	9	Ret	Ret	15	Ret	Ret	16	12	13	Ret	16	14	15^{†}	8	Ret	5	6	7	1	17	Ret	44
9	(Italy) Petrol Ofisi FMS International	9	16	Ret	Ret	8	8	DSQ	14	6	1	Ret	14	1	2	3	3	Ret	15	Ret	6	Ret	15	37
9	(Italy) Petrol Ofisi FMS International	10	Ret	13	DNS	Ret	Ret	15	18	19	16	17^{†}	19	Ret	11	14	Ret	11	20	14	20	13	Ret	37
10	(Italy) Trident Racing	11	DNS	16^{†}	Ret	17^{†}	**1**	10	8	7	2	6	4	Ret	Ret	16	10	8	Ret	20^{†}	18	Ret	19	35
10	(Italy) Trident Racing	12	18	Ret	13	10	12	Ret	11	18	Ret	5	2	11	10	Ret	Ret	Ret	10	Ret	13	Ret	16	35
11	(Brazil) Minardi Piquet Sports	3	Ret	15	Ret	DNS	15	Ret	Ret	Ret	18	12	10	Ret	13	7	2	14	Ret	19^{†}	16	15	18	22
11	(Brazil) Minardi Piquet Sports	4	Ret	12	4	Ret	Ret	16	9	8	11	10	9	6	3	11	8	Ret	8	15	10	Ret	17	22
12	(United Kingdom) DPR	20	13	Ret	12	Ret	Ret	Ret	12	Ret	21	Ret	18	Ret	DNS	DNS	DNS	Ret	13	12	Ret	Ret	Ret	15
12	(United Kingdom) DPR	21	12	9	14	Ret	14	12	10	Ret	20	Ret	13	12	Ret	Ret	Ret	Ret	7	6	2	6	3	15
13	(Spain) BCN Competición	18	11	14	9	18^{†}	Ret	11	13	16	Ret	13	11	Ret	DNS	Ret	Ret	9	11	11	Ret	14	Ret	4
13	(Spain) BCN Competición	19	15	Ret	11	Ret	13	13	17	17	15	16	22^{†}	9	Ret	9	9	Ret	16^{†}	8	4	11	11	4
Pos	Team	Car No.	BHR (Bahrain)		CAT (Spain)		MON (Monaco)	MAG (France)		SIL (United Kingdom)		NÜR (Germany)		HUN (Hungary)		IST (Turkey)		MNZ (Italy)		SPA (Belgium)		VAL (Spain)		Points

Notes:

- † – Drivers did not finish the race, but were classified as they completed more than 90% of the race distance.
