= Jason Tahincioğlu =

Turkish-British auto racing driver

Jason Tahincioglu
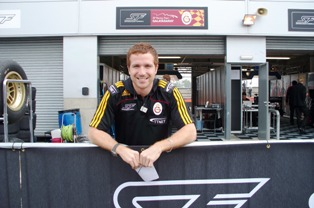
- Nationality: (Turkey) Turkish
- Born: 29 October 1983 (age 43) Bristol, England
- Relatives: Mümtaz Tahincioğlu, Ann Tahincioğlu

GP2 Series career
- Debut season: 2006
- Current team: Petrol Ofisi FMS International
- Car number: 10
- Starts: 40
- Wins: 0
- Poles: 0
- Fastest laps: 0
- Best finish: 30th in 2006

Previous series
- 2003–2005 2006 2006–2007 2008: British Formula Renault; World Series by Renault; Euroseries 3000; GP2 Asia

Jason Tahincioğlu (pronounced [tahindʒioːɫu]; born 29 October 1983), also known as Jason Tahinci, is a Turkish-British auto racing driver born into a car racing family.

== Career ==
Tahincioğlu started driving mini karts at the age of six. In 1990, he debuted in kart racing. From 1991 on, he became champion in mini-kart racing for four successive years. Tahincioğlu moved up then in 1995 to the Promo kart series and became second after his elder sister Raina Tahincioğlu. The next year, he went to the Netherlands to participate in the championships there and became fifth among 24 drivers. Returning to Turkey, Tahincioğlu became champion in the Promo series in 1997 and 1998. During this time, he also participated in the European Junior Championships. He moved to the Super kart category and became champion in 1999 and 2000. Tahincioğlu ended his kart racing career with eight Turkish championship titles.

Tahincioğlu experienced the taste of driving a Formula Three racing car for the first time on his birthday in 1998, a gift from his father Mümtaz Tahincioğlu, long-time president of Turkish Motorsports Federation (TOSFED) and FIA Council Member. In 2000, he debuted in the Turkish Formula Three Championship and finished in second place. In 2001, he did not race in order to finish high school. From 2002, he competed in the British Formula Renault championship finishing 20th in 2005. In August 2005, Tahincioğlu became the first ever Turkish racer to drive a Formula One car when he completed test runs for Jordan Grand Prix on a Toyota TF105 at the Silverstone Circuit.

In 2006, Tahincioğlu became the teammate of Luca Filippi in the GP2 team FMS International, with the Turkish gasoline company Petrol Ofisi named as their new sponsor at the same time. He signed a two-year deal with the team, matching the sponsorship deal made as a part of Petrol Ofisi's backing extension. Despite scoring no points, he was retained for the second year of his contract in 2007. In 2006, he also raced in the Turkish leg of the World Series by Renault. He competed in both races in the 3.5 class.

For the 2008 season, Tahincioğlu competed for the BCN Competicion team in the GP2 Asia Series. In the same year, he was also a test driver for the Galatasaray team in the inaugural Superleague Formula season, having revealed he was a lifelong fan of Galatasaray.

Tahincioğlu was educated in automotive engineering at the University of Bath in England.

== Racing record ==
=== Career summary ===
Season	Series	Team	Races	Wins	Poles	F/Laps	Podiums	Points	Position
2002	British Formula Three Championship	Fred Goddard Racing	2	0	0	0	0	0	NC
2003	Formula Renault 2.0 UK Championship	Mark Burdett Motorsport	17	0	0	0	0	49	21st
2004	Formula Renault 2.0 UK Championship	Team JLR	20	0	0	0	0	53	27th
2005	Formula Renault 2.0 UK Championship	Team JLR	14	0	0	0	0	66	20th
2005	Formula Renault 2.0 UK Championship	Team AKA	6	0	0	0	0	66	20th
2005	1000 km of Istanbul – LMP1	Jota Sport	1	0	0	0	0	N/A	5th
2006	GP2 Series	Petrol Ofisi FMS International	22	0	0	0	0	0	30th
2006	Formula Renault 3.5 Series	Eurointernational	2	0	0	0	0	0	40th
2006	Euroseries 3000	Team Astromega	3	0	0	0	0	4	14th
2007	GP2 Series	Petrol Ofisi FMS International	22	0	0	0	0	0	33rd
2007	Euroseries 3000	Eurointernational	4	0	0	0	1	9	13th
2008	GP2 Asia Series	BCN Competición	10	0	0	0	0	0	22nd
2008	Superleague Formula	Galatasaray S.K.	Test driver						
2024	GT4 European Series – Pro-Am Cup	Borusan Otomotiv Motorsport	9	0	0	0	0	12	19th

=== Complete British Formula Three Championship results ===
(key) (Races in bold indicate pole position) (Races in italics indicate fastest lap)

Year	Entrant	Chassis	Engine	Class	1	2	3	4	5	6	7	8	9	10	11	12	13	14	15	16	17	18	19	20	21	22	23	24	25	26	DC	Points
2002	Fred Goddard Racing	Dallara F301	Renault Sodemo	Scholarship	BRH; 1	BRH; 2	DON; 1 DNQ	DON; 2 DNQ	SIL; 1	SIL; 2	KNO; 1	KNO; 2	CRO; 1	CRO; 2	SIL; 1	SIL; 2	CAS; 1	CAS; 2	BRH; 1	BRH; 2	ROC; 1	ROC; 2	OUL; 1	OUL; 2	SNE; 1	SNE; 2	THR; 1	THR; 2	DON; 1	DON; 2	NC	0

=== Complete Formula Renault 2.0 UK Championship results ===
(key) (Races in bold indicate pole position) (Races in italics indicate fastest lap)

Year	Entrant	1	2	3	4	5	6	7	8	9	10	11	12	13	14	15	16	17	18	19	20	DC	Points
2003	Mark Burdett Motorsport	SNE; 1; 20	SNE; 2; 14	BRH; Ret	THR; Ret	SIL; 22	ROC; 19	CRO; 1; 15	CRO; 2; 16	DON; 1; 18	DON; 2; 18	SNE; 16	BRH; 1 Ret	BRH; 2; 22	DON; 1 Ret	DON; 2; 17	OUL; 1; 15	OUL; 2; 14				21st	49
2004	Team JLR	THR; 1 Ret	THR; 2; 26	BRH; 1; 23	BRH; 2; 21	SIL; 1; 22	SIL; 2; 20	OUL; 1 DNS	OUL; 2 Ret	THR; 1; 18	THR; 2; 12	CRO; 1; 17	CRO; 2; 18	KNO; 1; 15	KNO; 2; 16	BRH; 1; 14	BRH; 2 Ret	SNE; 1; 15	SNE; 2; 12	DON; 1 Ret	DON; 2 Ret	27th	53
2005	Team JLR	DON; 1; 22	DON; 2; 19	THR; 1 Ret	THR; 2; 14	BRH; 1; 17	BRH; 2; 19	OUL; 1; 15	OUL; 2 Ret	CRO; 1; 16	CRO; 2 Ret	SNE; 1; 15	SNE; 2; 18	KNO; 1; 19	KNO; 2; 16							20th	66
2005	Team AKA															DON; 1; 17	DON; 2; 14	SIL; 1 Ret	SIL; 2; 11	BRH; 1; 19	BRH; 2; 20	20th	66

=== Complete GP2 Series results ===
(key) (Races in bold indicate pole position) (Races in italics indicate fastest lap)

Year	Entrant	1	2	3	4	5	6	7	8	9	10	11	12	13	14	15	16	17	18	19	20	21	DC	Points
2006	Petrol Ofisi FMS International	VAL; FEA; DNS	VAL; SPR; Ret	IMO; FEA; Ret	IMO; SPR; Ret	NÜR; FEA; DSQ	NÜR; SPR; 18	CAT; FEA; 15	CAT; SPR; 19	MON; FEA; Ret	SIL; FEA; 13	SIL; SPR; 16	MAG; FEA; Ret	MAG; SPR; 17	HOC; FEA; 17	HOC; SPR; 17	HUN; FEA; Ret	HUN; SPR; 14	IST; FEA; 17	IST; SPR; 17	MNZ; FEA; 11	MNZ; SPR; 13	30th	0
2007	Petrol Ofisi FMS International	BHR; FEA; Ret	BHR; SPR; 13	CAT; FEA; DNS	CAT; SPR; Ret	MON; FEA; Ret	MAG; FEA; 15	MAG; SPR; 18	SIL; FEA; 19	SIL; SPR; 16	NÜR; FEA; 17	NÜR; SPR; 19	HUN; FEA; Ret	HUN; SPR; 11	IST; FEA; 14	IST; SPR; Ret	MNZ; FEA; 11	MNZ; SPR; 20	SPA; FEA; 14	SPA; SPR; 20	VAL; FEA; 13	VAL; SPR; Ret	33rd	0

==== Complete GP2 Asia Series results ====
(key) (Races in bold indicate pole position) (Races in italics indicate fastest lap)

Year	Entrant	1	2	3	4	5	6	7	8	9	10	DC	Points
2008	BCN Competición	DUB; FEA; 19	DUB; SPR; 16	SEN; FEA; Ret	SEN; SPR; 17	SEP; FEA; 12	SEP; SPR; Ret	BHR; FEA; 17	BHR; SPR; 13	DUB; FEA; 9	DUB; SPR; 8	22nd	0

=== Complete Formula Renault 3.5 Series results ===
(key) (Races in bold indicate pole position) (Races in italics indicate fastest lap)

Year	Entrant	1	2	3	4	5	6	7	8	9	10	11	12	13	14	15	16	17	DC	Points
2006	Eurointernational	ZOL; 1	ZOL; 2	MON	IST; 1; 21	IST; 2; 16	MIS; 1	MIS; 2	SPA; 1	SPA; 2	NÜR; 1	NÜR; 2	DON; 1	DON; 2	LMS; 1	LMS; 2	BAR; 1	BAR; 2	40th	0

=== Complete Euroseries 3000 results ===
(key) (Races in bold indicate pole position) (Races in italics indicate fastest lap)

Year	Entrant	1	2	3	4	5	6	7	8	9	10	11	12	13	14	15	16	17	18	DC	Points
2006	Team Astromega	ADR; 1	ADR; 2	IMO; 1	IMO; 2	SPA; 1; 5	SPA; 2; 11	HUN; 1	HUN; 2	MUG; 1	MUG; 2	SIL; 1	SIL; 2	CAT; 1	CAT; 2	VLL; 1	VLL; 2	MIS; 1	MIS; 2	16th	4
2007	G-Tec	VLL; 1	VLL; 2	HUN; 1; 8	HUN; 2; 8	MAG; 1; 3	MAG; 2; 5	MUG; 1	MUG; 2	NÜR; 1	NÜR; 2	SPA; 1	SPA; 2	MNZ; 1	MNZ; 2	CAT; 1	CAT; 2			13th	9
