= Adrian Zaugg =

South African racecar driver

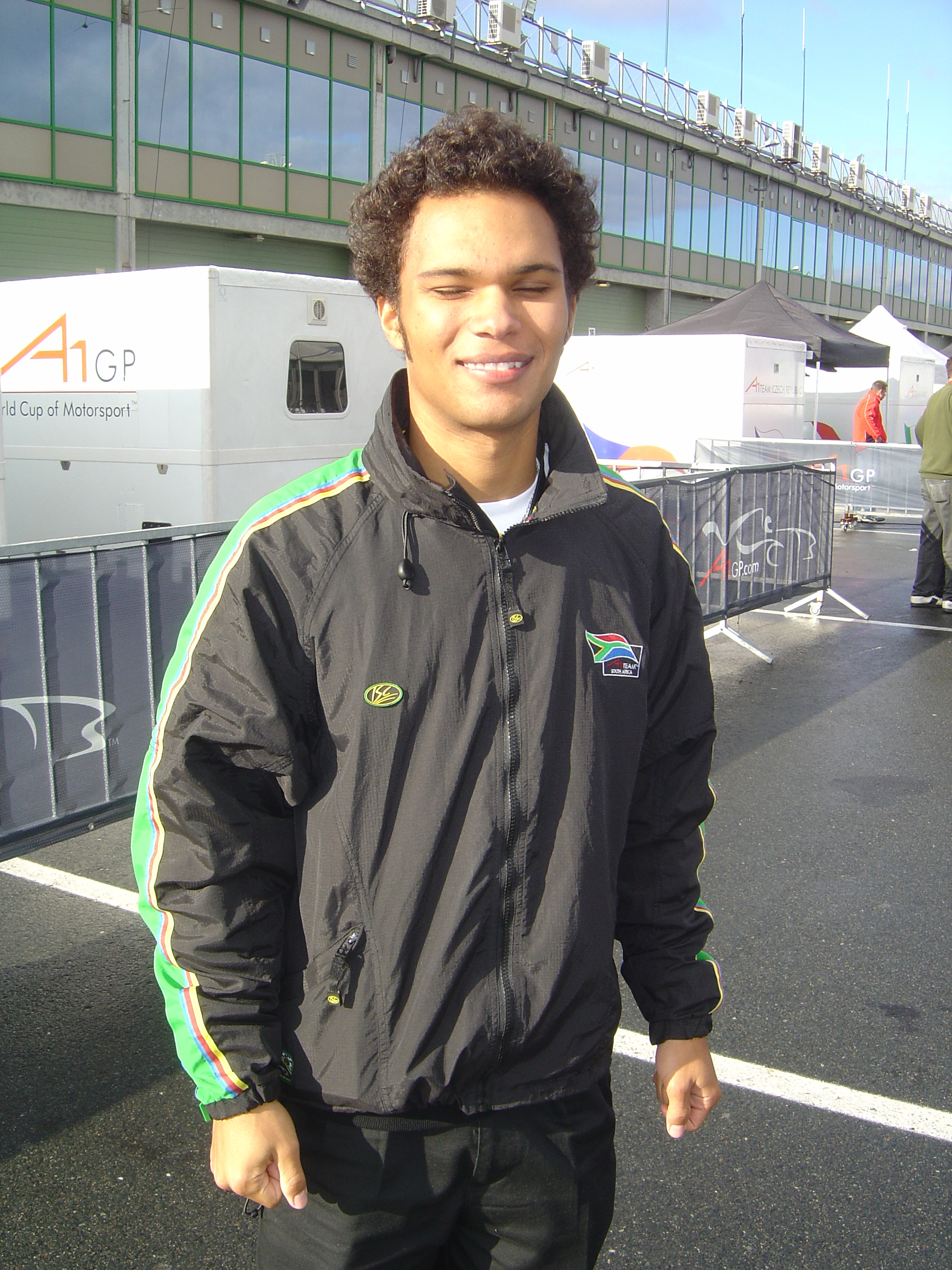
- Nationality: (South Africa) South African (Netherlands) Dutch via dual nationality
- Born: 4 November 1986 (age 40) Singapore

GP2 Series career
- Debut season: 2007
- Current team: Trident Racing
- Categorisation: FIA Silver (until 2014, 2017–); FIA Gold (2015–2016)
- Car number: 25
- Former teams: Arden International
- Starts: 38
- Wins: 0
- Poles: 0
- Fastest laps: 0
- Best finish: 18th in 2007 and 2010

Previous series
- 2009–10 2008–09 2006–07 2006, 2009 2005–06 2005–06 2004: GP2 Asia Series; A1 Grand Prix; A1 Grand Prix; Formula Renault 3.5 Series; Eurocup Formula Renault 2.0; Formula Renault 2.0 Italia; Formula BMW ADAC

Championship titles
- 2018: Blancpain Endurance Silver Cup

Adrian Zaugg (born 4 November 1986) is a South African former race car driver of Dutch descent. He was the champion of the 2018 Blancpain GT Series Endurance Cup in the Silver class.

== Racing career ==
=== Single-seaters ===
Zaugg made his GP2 Series debut in 2007 when he competed for Arden International alongside Bruno Senna.

Zaugg competed for A1 Team South Africa in A1 Grand Prix for three seasons between 2006 and 2009.

In 2010, Zaugg returned to GP2 Series, driving for Trident Motorsport.

=== Lamborghini Super Trofeo ===
Zaugg competed in four rounds of the 2012 Lamborghini Super Trofeo season with Bonaldi Motorsport. He took pole position for the final round at Navarra and held the lead throughout race one to take his maiden win.

=== Blancpain Endurance Series ===
For 2015, Zaugg joined Grasser Racing Team in the Blancpain Endurance Series, sharing a car with Mirko Bortolotti and Giovanni Venturini.

After taking a break from racing in 2017 due to health issues, Zaugg raced with Emil Frey Racing in the 2018 Blancpain GT Series alongside Alex Fontana and Mikaël Grenier.

== Racing record ==
=== Complete Formula BMW ADAC results ===
(key) (Races in bold indicate pole position; races in italics indicate fastest lap)

Year	Entrant	1	2	3	4	5	6	7	8	9	10	11	12	13	14	15	16	17	18	19	20	DC	Points
2004	Josef Kaufmann Racing	HOC1; 1; 11	HOC1; 2; 6	ADR; 1; 19	ADR; 2; 14	NÜR1; 1; 5	NÜR1; 2; 22	LAU; 1; 8	LAU; 2; 10	NOR; 1 Ret	NOR; 2 Ret	NÜR2; 1; 14	NÜR2; 2; 5	OSC; 1; 6	OSC; 2 Ret	ZAN; 1; 6	ZAN; 2; 7	BRN; 1; 9	BRN; 2; 8	HOC2; 1; 5	HOC2; 2 Ret	7th	55

=== Complete Formula Renault 2.0 Italia results ===
(key) (Races in bold indicate pole position; races in italics indicate fastest lap)

Year	Entrant	1	2	3	4	5	6	7	8	9	10	11	12	13	14	15	16	17	DC	Points
2005	Jenzer Motorsport	VLL; 1; 4	VLL; 2; 3	IMO; 1; 5	IMO; 2; 3	SPA; 1; 28	SPA; 2; 3	MNZ1; 1 Ret	MNZ1; 2; 20	MNZ1; 3; 4	MUG; 1	MUG; 2	MIS; 1; 4	MIS; 2; 3	MIS; 3; 3	VAR; 12	MNZ2; 1; 3	MNZ2; 2; 19	5th	142
2006	Cram Competition	MUG; 1; 1	**MUG**; **2**; 1	VLL; 1; 1	VLL; 2; 3	**IMO**; **1**; 1	**IMO**; **2**; 1	SPA; 1; 2	SPA; 2 Ret	HOC; 1; 26	HOC; 2; 3	MIS; 1; 3	MIS; 2; 3	**VAR**; 1	MNZ; 1; 4	MNZ; 2; 2			2nd	342

=== Complete Eurocup Formula Renault 2.0 results ===
(key) (Races in bold indicate pole position; races in italics indicate fastest lap)

Year	Entrant	1	2	3	4	5	6	7	8	9	10	11	12	13	14	15	16	DC	Points
2005	Jenzer Motorsport	ZOL; 1; 7	ZOL; 2; 9	VAL; 1; 23	VAL; 2; 9	LMS; 1; 11	LMS; 2; 3	BIL; 1; 3	**BIL**; **2**; 1	OSC; 1 Ret	OSC; 2; 15	DON; 1; 2	DON; 2 Ret	EST; 1; 11	EST; 2 Ret	MNZ; 1 DSQ	MNZ; 2 Ret	6th	57
2006	Cram Competition	ZOL; 1; 12	ZOL; 2; 8	IST; 1 Ret	IST; 2; 16	MIS; 1 Ret*	MIS; 2; 3	NÜR; 1	NÜR; 2	DON; 1	DON; 2	LMS; 1	LMS; 2	CAT; 1	CAT; 2			16th	14

=== Complete Formula Renault 3.5 Series results ===
(key) (Races in bold indicate pole position) (Races in italics indicate fastest lap)

Year	Team	1	2	3	4	5	6	7	8	9	10	11	12	13	14	15	16	17	Pos	Points
2006	Carlin Motorsport	ZOL; 1	ZOL; 2	MON; 1	IST; 1	IST; 2	MIS; 1	MIS; 2	SPA; 1	SPA; 2	NÜR; 1; 17	NÜR; 2; 8	**DON**; **1**; 2	DON; 2; 2	LMS; 1	LMS; 2	CAT; 1; 6	CAT; 2 Ret	13th	33
2009	Interwetten.com Racing	CAT; 1; 10	CAT; 2; 5	SPA; 1; 12	SPA; 2; 7	MON; 1; 2	HUN; 1; 10	HUN; 2 Ret	SIL; 1; 13	SIL; 2; 11	LEM; 1 Ret	LEM; 2; 15	ALG; 1	ALG; 2	NÜR; 1	NÜR; 2	ALC; 1	ALC; 2	14th	27

=== Complete A1 Grand Prix results ===
(key) (Races in bold indicate pole position) (Races in italics indicate fastest lap)

Year	Entrant	1	2	3	4	5	6	7	8	9	10	11	12	13	14	15	16	17	18	19	20	21	22	DC	Points
2006–07	South Africa	**NED**; **SPR**; 1	NED; FEA; Ret	CZE; SPR	CZE; FEA	BEI; SPR; Ret	BEI; FEA; 5	MYS; SPR; 13	MYS; FEA; 12	IDN; SPR	IND; FEA	NZL; SPR	NZL; FEA	AUS; SPR	AUS; FEA	RSA; SPR; 7	RSA; FEA; Ret	MEX; SPR; 4	MEX; FEA; 3	SHA; SPR	SHA; FEA	GBR; SPR; 15	GBR; SPR; Ret	14th	24
2007–08	South Africa	**NED**; **SPR**; 1	**NED**; **FEA**; 2	**CZE**; **SPR**; 4	CZE; FEA; 16	MYS; SPR; 10	MYS; FEA; Ret	CHN; SPR; Ret	CHN; FEA; 3	NZL; SPR; 4	NZL; FEA; 7	AUS; SPR; 7	AUS; FEA; 1	RSA; SPR; 13	RSA; FEA; 7	**MEX**; **SPR**; Ret	MEX; FEA; 6	CHN; SPR; 7	CHN; FEA; 16	GBR; SPR; 7	GBR; SPR; 11			5th	96
2008–09	South Africa	NED; SPR; 6	NED; FEA; Ret	CHN; SPR; 5	CHN; FEA; 9	MYS; SPR; 9	MYS; FEA; 5	NZL; SPR; 10	NZL; FEA; 9	RSA; SPR; 7	RSA; FEA; Ret	POR; SPR; 17	POR; FEA; Ret	GBR; SPR	GBR; SPR									14th	19

=== Complete GP2 Series results ===
(key) (Races in bold indicate pole position) (Races in italics indicate fastest lap)

Year	Entrant	1	2	3	4	5	6	7	8	9	10	11	12	13	14	15	16	17	18	19	20	21	DC	Points
2007	Arden International	BHR; FEA; 6	BHR; SPR; 17	CAT; FEA; Ret	CAT; SPR; 13	MON; FEA; 9	MAG; FEA; 6	MAG; SPR; Ret	SIL; FEA; 14	SIL; SPR; 19	NÜR; FEA; 7	NÜR; SPR; Ret	HUN; FEA; 7	HUN; SPR; Ret	IST; FEA; Ret	IST; SPR; 15	MNZ; FEA; Ret	MNZ; SPR; Ret	SPA; FEA; 13	SPA; SPR; 19	VAL; FEA	VAL; SPR	18th	10
2010	Trident Racing	CAT; FEA; 16	CAT; SPR; 15	MON; FEA; Ret	MON; SPR; 12	IST; FEA; Ret	IST; SPR; Ret	VAL; FEA; 14	VAL; SPR; 15	SIL; FEA; 15	SIL; SPR; 21	HOC; FEA; 7	HOC; SPR; 3	HUN; FEA; 15	HUN; SPR; 8	SPA; FEA; 15	SPA; SPR; 9	MNZ; FEA; 6	MNZ; SPR; 7	YMC; FEA; Ret	YMC; SPR; DNS		18th	9

=== Complete Auto GP Series results ===
(key) (Races in bold indicate pole position) (Races in italics indicate fastest lap)

Year	Entrant	1	2	3	4	5	6	7	8	9	10	11	12	13	14	DC	Points
2010	Trident Racing	BRN; 1; 8	BRN; 2; 2	IMO; 1	IMO; 2	SPA; 1	SPA; 2	MAG; 1	MAG; 2	NAV; 1	NAV; 2	MNZ; 1	MNZ; 2			15th	6
2011	Super Nova Racing	MNZ; 1; 11	MNZ; 2; 7	HUN; 1	HUN; 2	BRN; 1	BRN; 2	DON; 1	DON; 2	OSC; 1	OSC; 2	VAL; 1	VAL; 2	MUG; 1	MUG; 2	19th	3

Sporting positions
Preceded by Inaugural	Blancpain GT Series Endurance Cup; Silver Cup Champion; 2018; With: Alex Fontana & Mikaël Grenier	Succeeded by Nico Bastian; Timur Boguslavskiy; Felipe Fraga
