= Alastair Gibson =

South African Formula One and motorsport mechanic and executive

- Born: 19 August 1962 (age 64); Johannesburg, South Africa
- Employer: Honda

Alastair Gibson (born 19 August 1962) is a South African Formula One and motorsport mechanic and executive.

== Career ==
In 1979, he completed a four year engineering degree and began his motorsport career in South Africa in the Formula Ford category. In 1988, he moved to Britain to work in the Formula Ford 1600 and 2000 categories, and in 1991, he moved to Formula Atlantic in the USA. In 1992, he joined the Formula 3000 series with The Dome Company and Madgwick.

Gibson began his career in Formula One in 1995 with Benetton, working as the mechanic for car number 1. In 1999, he moved to the newly established British American Racing team—remaining there as it transitioned into Honda in 2006—and served in roles including that of the "lollipop man" during pit stops. He stopped working for Honda after the 2008 Malaysian Grand Prix.

== Personal life ==
Gibson is married to Carolyn, and they have one son. He hobbies include vintage cars, sculpting, and writing.
