= 2008 UAE 1st GP2 Asia Series round =

(United Arab Emirates) 2008 UAE GP2 round
Round details
- Round 1 of 5 rounds in the 2008 GP2 Series
- Location: Dubai Autodrome in Dubai, United Arab Emirates
- Course: Permanent racing facility 4.290 km (2.666 mi)

GP2 Series

Feature race
- Date: 25 January 2008
- Laps: 42 (180.180 km)

Pole position
Driver	(France) Romain Grosjean	ART Grand Prix
- Time: 1:21.760

Podium
First	(France) Romain Grosjean	ART Grand Prix
Second	(Brazil) Bruno Senna	iSport International
Third	(Spain) Andy Soucek	DPR

Fastest lap
Driver	(Brazil) Bruno Senna	iSport International
- Time: 1:22.462 (on lap 40)

Sprint race
- Date: 26 January 2008
- Laps: 28 (120.120 km)

Podium
First	(France) Romain Grosjean	ART Grand Prix
Second	(Malaysia) Fairuz Fauzy	Super Nova Racing
Third	(India) Karun Chandhok	iSport International

Fastest lap
Driver	(France) Romain Grosjean	ART Grand Prix
- Time: 1:22.453 (on lap 23)

The 2008 UAE 1st GP2 Asia Series round was a GP2 Asia Series motor race held on 25 and 26 January 2008 at Dubai Autodrome in Dubai, United Arab Emirates. It was the first round of the 2008 GP2 Asia Series.

== Classification ==
=== Qualifying ===
Pos.	No.	Driver	Team	Time	Gap	Grid
1	4	(France) Romain Grosjean	ART Grand Prix	1:21.760		1
2	2	(Brazil) Bruno Senna	iSport International	1:21.809	+0.049	2
3	23	(Spain) Andy Soucek	DPR	1:21.859	+0.099	3
4	1	(India) Karun Chandhok	iSport International	1:21.963	+0.203	4
5	16	(Spain) Adrián Vallés	Fisichella Motor Sport International	1:22.180	+0.420	5
6	27	(Italy) Luca Filippi	Qi-Meritus Mahara	1:22.187	+0.427	6
7	21	(Italy) Marco Bonanomi	Piquet Sports	1:22.373	+0.613	7
8	26	(Japan) Hiroki Yoshimoto	Qi-Meritus Mahara	1:22.469	+0.709	8
9	14	(Italy) Davide Valsecchi	Durango	1:22.485	+0.725	9
10	11	(Switzerland) Sébastien Buemi	Trust Team Arden	1:22.520	+0.760	10
11	10	(Japan) Kamui Kobayashi	DAMS	1:22.556	+0.796	11
12	19	(China) Ho-Pin Tung	Trident Racing	1:22.595	+0.835	12
13	8	(Malaysia) Fairuz Fauzy	Super Nova Racing	1:22.874	+1.114	13
14	15	(Brazil) Alberto Valerio	Durango	1:22.891	+1.131	14
15	7	(Denmark) Christian Bakkerud	Super Nova Racing	1:22.947	+1.187	15
16	18	(Latvia) Harald Schlegelmilch	Trident Racing	1:23.048	+1.288	16
17	6	(Brazil) Diego Nunes	Barwa International Campos Team	1:23.190	+1.430	17
18	24	(Serbia) Miloš Pavlović	BCN Competicion	1:23.240	+1.480	18
19	3	(United Kingdom) Stephen Jelley	ART Grand Prix	1:23.637	+1.877	19
20	12	(Pakistan) Adam Khan	Trust Team Arden	1:23.859	+2.099	20
21	9	(Belgium) Jérôme d'Ambrosio	DAMS	1:23.867	+2.107	21
22	25	(Turkey) Jason Tahincioglu	BCN Competicion	1:23.941	+2.181	22
23	17	(Romania) Michael Herck	Fisichella Motor Sport International	1:24.078	+2.318	23
24	20	(Italy) Marcello Puglisi	Piquet Sports	1:24.378	+2.618	24
25	22	(India) Armaan Ebrahim	DPR	1:24.864	+3.104	25
26	5	(Russia) Vitaly Petrov	Barwa International Campos Team	No time		26

=== Feature race ===
Pos.	No.	Driver	Team	Laps	Time/Retired	Grid	Points
1	4	(France) Romain Grosjean	ART Grand Prix	42	59:25.309	1	10+2
2	2	(Brazil) Bruno Senna	iSport International	42	+12.358	2	8+1
3	23	(Spain) Andy Soucek	DPR	42	+17.347	3	6
4	16	(Spain) Adrián Vallés	Fisichella Motor Sport International	42	+17.768	5	5
5	27	(Italy) Luca Filippi	Qi-Meritus Mahara	42	+18.309	6	4
6	26	(Japan) Hiroki Yoshimoto	Qi-Meritus Mahara	42	+28.209	8	3
7	1	(India) Karun Chandhok	iSport International	42	+36.568	4	2
8	8	(Malaysia) Fairuz Fauzy	Super Nova Racing	42	+40.767	13	1
9	15	(Brazil) Alberto Valerio	Durango	42	+46.218	14	
10	24	(Serbia) Miloš Pavlović	BCN Competicion	42	+59.581	18	
11	9	(Belgium) Jérôme d'Ambrosio	DAMS	42	+1:00.029	21	
12	6	(Brazil) Diego Nunes	Barwa International Campos Team	42	+1:02.146	17	
13	10	(Japan) Kamui Kobayashi	DAMS	42	+1:02.634	11	
14	18	(Latvia) Harald Schlegelmilch	Trident Racing	42	+1:09:902	16	
15	3	(United Kingdom) Stephen Jelley	ART Grand Prix	42	+1:24.834	19	
16	20	(Italy) Marcello Puglisi	Piquet Sports	41	+1 lap	24	
17	14	(Italy) Davide Valsecchi	Durango	41	+1 lap	9	
18	12	(Pakistan) Adam Khan	Trust Team Arden	41	+1 lap	20	
19	25	(Turkey) Jason Tahincioglu	BCN Competicion	41	+1 lap	22	
20	21	(Italy) Marco Bonanomi	Piquet Sports	41	+1 lap	7	
21	22	(India) Armaan Ebrahim	DPR	40	+2 laps	25	
22	19	(China) Ho-Pin Tung	Trident Racing	40	+2 laps	12	
Ret	17	(Romania) Michael Herck	Fisichella Motor Sport International	10	Retired	23	
Ret	7	(Denmark) Christian Bakkerud	Super Nova Racing	6	Retired	15	
DNS	5	(Russia) Vitaly Petrov	Barwa International Campos Team	0	Gearbox^{1}	26	
DSQ	11	(Switzerland) Sébastien Buemi	Trust Team Arden	42	Disqualified^{2}	10	

Notes

- ^1 – Vitaly Petrov did not start due to a gearbox failure.
- ^2 – Sébastien Buemi finished seventh but was disqualified because the car's side skirts did not meet the technical regulations.

=== Sprint race ===
Pos.	No.	Driver	Team	Laps	Time/Retired	Grid	Points
1	4	(France) Romain Grosjean	ART Grand Prix	28	43:32.991	8	6+1
2	8	(Malaysia) Fairuz Fauzy	Super Nova Racing	28	+3.778	1	5
3	1	(India) Karun Chandhok	iSport International	28	+5.974	2	4
4	26	(Japan) Hiroki Yoshimoto	Qi-Meritus Mahara	28	+12.147	3	3
5	15	(Brazil) Alberto Valerio	Durango	28	+12.854	9	2
6	14	(Italy) Davide Valsecchi	Durango	28	+18.367	17	1
7	23	(Spain) Andy Soucek	DPR	28	+19.360	6	
8	9	(Belgium) Jérôme d'Ambrosio	DAMS	28	+25.052	11	
9	5	(Russia) Vitaly Petrov	Barwa International Campos Team	28	+25.687	25	
10	19	(China) Ho-Pin Tung	Trident Racing	28	+26.339	22	
11	7	(Denmark) Christian Bakkerud	Super Nova Racing	28	+28.754	24	
12	3	(United Kingdom) Stephen Jelley	ART Grand Prix	28	+34.481	15	
12	21	(Italy) Marco Bonanomi	Piquet Sports	28	+35.562	20	
14	24	(Serbia) Miloš Pavlović	BCN Competicion	28	+36.624	10	
15	12	(Pakistan) Adam Khan	Trust Team Arden	28	+43.462	18	
16	25	(Turkey) Jason Tahincioglu	BCN Competicion	28	+48.157	19	
17	17	(Romania) Michael Herck	Fisichella Motor Sport International	28	+48.750	23	
18	18	(Latvia) Harald Schlegelmilch	Trident Racing	27	+1 lap	14	
19	2	(Brazil) Bruno Senna	iSport International	27	+1 lap	7	
Ret	22	(India) Armaan Ebrahim	DPR	19	Retired	21	
Ret	27	(Italy) Luca Filippi	Qi-Meritus Mahara	4	Retired	4	
Ret	16	(Spain) Adrián Vallés	Fisichella Motor Sport International	0	Retired	5	
Ret	10	(Japan) Kamui Kobayashi	DAMS	0	Retired	13	
Ret	20	(Italy) Marcello Puglisi	Piquet Sports	0	Retired	16	
Ret	11	(Switzerland) Sébastien Buemi	Trust Team Arden	0	Retired	26	
DNS	6	(Brazil) Diego Nunes	Barwa International Campos Team	0	Fuel leak^{3}	12	

Notes

- ^3 – Diego Nunes did not start due to a fuel leak.

== Standings after the event ==
Drivers' Championship standings

Pos.	Driver	Points
1	(France) Romain Grosjean	19
2	(Brazil) Bruno Senna	9
3	(Malaysia) Fairuz Fauzy	6
4	(India) Karun Chandhok	6
5	(Spain) Andy Soucek	6

Teams' Championship standings

Pos.	Team	Points
1	(France) ART Grand Prix	19
2	(United Kingdom) iSport International	15
3	(Malaysia) Qi-Meritus Mahara	10
4	(United Kingdom) Super Nova Racing	6
5	(United Kingdom) DPR	6

- Note: Only the top five positions are included for both sets of standings.

== See also ==
- 2008 UAE 1st Speedcar Series round

Previous round: None	GP2 Asia Series Championship; 2008 season	Next round: 2008 Indonesian GP2 Asia Series round
Previous round: None	UAE GP2 Asia Series round	Next round: 2008 UAE 2nd GP2 Asia Series round
