= 2008 Malaysian Speedcar Series round =

Layout of the Sepang International Circuit

The 2008 Malaysian Speedcar Series round was the third round of the 2008 Speedcar Series. It was held on 22 and 23 March 2008 at Sepang International Circuit in Sepang, Malaysia. The race supported the 2008 Malaysian Grand Prix.

== Classification ==
=== Qualifying ===
Pos.	No.	Driver	Team	Time	Gap	Grid
1	27	(France) Jean Alesi	Speedcar Team	2:11.342		1
2	69	(United Kingdom) Johnny Herbert	Speedcar Team	2:12.740	+1.398	2
3	21	(Austria) Mathias Lauda	G.P.C. Squadra Corse	2:12.750	+1.408	3
4	20	(France) David Terrien	Union Properties	2:13.414	+2.072	4
5	08	(Germany) Uwe Alzen	Phoenix Racing Team	2:14.014	+2.672	5
6	18	(Indonesia) Ananda Mikola	Speedcar Team	2:14.165	+2.823	6
7	85	(United Arab Emirates) Hasher Al Maktoum	Union Properties	2:14.479	+3.137	7
8	06	(Japan) Ukyo Katayama	Speedcar Team	2:14.597	+3.255	8
9	10	(Italy) Gianni Morbidelli	Speedcar Team	2:14.632	+3.290	9
10	07	(Sweden) Stefan Johansson	Speedcar Team	2:14.670	+3.328	10
11	71	(France) Nicolas Navarro	Team First Centreville	2:14.673	+3.331	11
12	17	(France) Fabien Giroix	Team First Centreville	2:15.213	+3.871	12
13	50	(Hong Kong) Marchy Lee	Speedcar Team	2:16.508	+5.166	13
14	80	(Germany) Christian Danner	Phoenix Racing Team	2:17.162	+5.730	14
15	09	(Malaysia) Alex Yoong	Speedcar Team	2:17.436	+6.094	15
16	90	(Finland) Jyrki Järvilehto	Speedcar Team	2:17.740	+6.398	16

=== Race 1 ===
Pos.	No.	Driver	Team	Laps	Time/Retired	Grid	Points
1	27	(France) Jean Alesi	Speedcar Team	19	42:06.705	1	10
2	69	(United Kingdom) Johnny Herbert	Speedcar Team	19	+0.286	2	8
3	21	(Austria) Mathias Lauda	Speedcar Team	19	+18.556	3	6
4	08	(Germany) Uwe Alzen	Phoenix Racing Team	19	+21.348	5	5
5	18	(Indonesia) Ananda Mikola	Speedcar Team	19	+23.894	6	4
6	07	(Sweden) Stefan Johansson	Speedcar Team	19	+28.279	10	3
7	71	(France) Nicolas Navarro	Team First Centreville	19	+28.547	11	2
8	20	(France) David Terrien	Union Properties	19	+32.939	4	1
9	10	(Italy) Gianni Morbidelli	Speedcar Team	19	+35.038	9	
10	85	(United Arab Emirates) Hasher Al Maktoum	Union Properties	19	+46.177	7	
11	09	(Malaysia) Alex Yoong	Speedcar Team	19	+57.090	15	
12	10	(Finland) Jyrki Järvilehto	Speedcar Team	19	+59.385	16	
13	80	(Germany) Christian Danner	Phoenix Racing Team	19	+1:13.787	14	
14	50	(Hong Kong) Marchy Lee	Speedcar Team	19	+1:18.226	13	
15	06	(Japan) Ukyo Katayama	Speedcar Team	17	+2 Laps	8	
Ret	17	(France) Fabien Giroix	Team First Centreville	12	DNF	12	

=== Race 2 ===
Pos.	No.	Driver	Team	Laps	Time/Retired	Grid	Points
1	08	(Germany) Uwe Alzen	Phoenix Racing Team	19	40:05.212	5	10
2	20	(France) David Terrien	Union Properties	19	+1.936	1	8
3	27	(France) Jean Alesi	Speedcar Team	19	+9.334	8	6
4	69	(United Kingdom) Johnny Herbert	Speedcar Team	19	+11.381	7	5
5	10	(Italy) Gianni Morbidelli	Speedcar Team	19	+15.059	9	4
6	07	(Sweden) Stefan Johansson	Speedcar Team	19	+20.630	3	3
7	71	(France) Nicolas Navarro	Team First Centreville	19	+22.467	11	2
8	85	(United Arab Emirates) Hasher Al Maktoum	Union Properties	19	+32.445	10	1
9	09	(Malaysia) Alex Yoong	Speedcar Team	19	+33.029	11	
10	10	(Finland) Jyrki Järvilehto	Speedcar Team	19	+42.795	12	
11	06	(Japan) Ukyo Katayama	Speedcar Team	19	+46.639	15	
12	80	(Germany) Christian Danner	Phoenix Racing Team	19	+1:38.515	13	
Ret	21	(Austria) Mathias Lauda	Speedcar Team	12	DNF	6	
Ret	18	(Indonesia) Ananda Mikola	Speedcar Team	8	DNF	4	
Ret	50	(Hong Kong) Marchy Lee	Speedcar Team	4	DNF	14	
Ret	17	(France) Fabien Giroix	Team First Centreville	0	DNF	16	

== See also ==
- 2008 Malaysian Grand Prix
- 2008 Malaysian GP2 Asia Series round
