= 2008 Speedcar Series =

The 2008 Speedcar Series was the inaugural Speedcar Series championship. It consisted of four points-scoring race meetings, with a further non-championship round beforehand. The Drivers' Championship was won by Johnny Herbert.

== Teams and drivers ==
All of the teams used the Speedcar V8 vehicle with tyres supplied by Michelin.

Team	No.	Driver name	Rounds
(United Arab Emirates) Speedcar Team	06	(Japan) Ukyo Katayama	All
(United Arab Emirates) Speedcar Team	07	(Sweden) Stefan Johansson	All
(United Arab Emirates) Speedcar Team	09	(Malaysia) Alex Yoong	2
(United Arab Emirates) Speedcar Team	10	(Italy) Gianni Morbidelli	All
(United Arab Emirates) Speedcar Team	18	(Indonesia) Ananda Mikola	All
(United Arab Emirates) Speedcar Team	27	(France) Jean Alesi	All
(United Arab Emirates) Speedcar Team	36	(Indonesia) Moreno Soeprapto	1
(United Arab Emirates) Speedcar Team	50	(Hong Kong) Marchy Lee	2–4
(United Arab Emirates) Speedcar Team	69	(United Kingdom) Johnny Herbert	All
(United Arab Emirates) Speedcar Team	90	(Finland) JJ Lehto	2–4
(United Arab Emirates) Speedcar Team	96	(Canada) Jacques Villeneuve	3–4
(Germany) Phoenix Racing	08	(Germany) Uwe Alzen	All
(Germany) Phoenix Racing	80	(Germany) Klaus Ludwig	1
(Germany) Phoenix Racing	80	(Germany) Christian Danner	2
(Germany) Phoenix Racing	80	(Germany) Heinz-Harald Frentzen	3
(Germany) Phoenix Racing	80	(Portugal) Pedro Lamy	4
(France) Team First Centreville	17	(France) Fabien Giroix	All
(France) Team First Centreville	71	(France) Nicolas Navarro	All
(United Arab Emirates) Union Properties	20	(France) David Terrien	All
(United Arab Emirates) Union Properties	85	(United Arab Emirates) Hasher Al Maktoum	All
(Italy) GPC Squadra Corse	21	(Austria) Mathias Lauda	1–2
(Italy) GPC Squadra Corse	21	(Germany) Klaus Ludwig	3

== Calendar ==
Round		Circuit	Date	Pole position	Fastest lap	Winning driver	Winning team	Report
NC	R1	(United Arab Emirates) Dubai Autodrome (International Circuit)	January 25	(Italy) Gianni Morbidelli	(France) David Terrien	(Italy) Gianni Morbidelli	(United Arab Emirates) Speedcar Team	Report
NC	R2	(United Arab Emirates) Dubai Autodrome (International Circuit)	January 26		(Germany) Uwe Alzen	(Italy) Gianni Morbidelli	(United Arab Emirates) Speedcar Team	Report
1	R1	(Indonesia) Sentul International Circuit	February 16	(Indonesia) Ananda Mikola	(Indonesia) Ananda Mikola	(France) Jean Alesi	(United Arab Emirates) Speedcar Team	Report
1	R2	(Indonesia) Sentul International Circuit	February 17		(Italy) Gianni Morbidelli	(Germany) Uwe Alzen	(Germany) Phoenix Racing	Report
2	R1	(Malaysia) Sepang International Circuit	March 22	(France) Jean Alesi	(France) Jean Alesi	(France) Jean Alesi	(United Arab Emirates) Speedcar Team	Report
2	R2	(Malaysia) Sepang International Circuit	March 23		(United Kingdom) Johnny Herbert	(Germany) Uwe Alzen	(Germany) Phoenix Racing	Report
3	R1	Bahrain International Circuit	April 5	(United Kingdom) Johnny Herbert	(France) Nicolas Navarro	(France) David Terrien	(United Arab Emirates) Union Properties	Report
3	R2	Bahrain International Circuit	April 6		(Germany) Uwe Alzen	(Italy) Gianni Morbidelli	(United Arab Emirates) Speedcar Team	Report
4	R1	(United Arab Emirates) Dubai Autodrome (Grand Prix Circuit)	April 11	(France) Nicolas Navarro	(United Kingdom) Johnny Herbert	(United Kingdom) Johnny Herbert	(United Arab Emirates) Speedcar Team	Report
4	R2	(United Arab Emirates) Dubai Autodrome (Grand Prix Circuit)	April 12		(United Kingdom) Johnny Herbert	(United Kingdom) Johnny Herbert	(United Arab Emirates) Speedcar Team	Report

== Championship Standings ==
=== Drivers ===
Points were awarded to the top eight classified finishers using the following structure:

Position	1st	2nd	3rd	4th	5th	6th	7th	8th
Points	10	8	6	5	4	3	2	1

Pos	Driver	SEN (Indonesia)		SEP (Malaysia)		BHR (Bahrain)		DUB (United Arab Emirates)		Points
1	(United Kingdom) Johnny Herbert	3	7	2	4	5	Ret	1	1	45
2	(France) David Terrien	4	4	8	2	1	Ret	2	2	45
3	(Germany) Uwe Alzen	5	1	4	1	DSQ	2	4	11	42
4	(France) Jean Alesi	1	2	1	3	10	3	Ret	Ret	40
5	(Italy) Gianni Morbidelli	11	13†	9	5	2	1	3	4	33
6	(France) Nicolas Navarro	6	10	7	7	3	7	6	5	22
7	(Austria) Mathias Lauda	2	5	3	Ret					18
8	(Indonesia) Ananda Mikola	8	3	5	Ret	Ret	5	Ret	7	17
9	(Hong Kong) Marchy Lee			14	Ret	4	Ret	5	3	15
10	(France) Fabien Giroix	10	12	Ret	DNS	Ret	4	10	6	8
11	(Germany) Klaus Ludwig	7	6			Ret	6			8
12	(Sweden) Stefan Johansson	12†	11	6	6	9	8	8	9	8
13	(United Arab Emirates) Hasher Al Maktoum	9	9	10	8	7	Ret	7	12	5
14	(Canada) Jacques Villeneuve					6	Ret	9	Ret	3
15	(Japan) Ukyo Katayama	13	8	15	11	8	Ret	12	Ret	2
16	(Finland) JJ Lehto			12	10	Ret	Ret	11	8	1
17	(Malaysia) Alex Yoong			11	9					0
18	(Germany) Heinz-Harald Frentzen					11†	9			0
19	(Portugal) Pedro Lamy							13	10	0
20	(Germany) Christian Danner			13	12					0
	(Indonesia) Moreno Soeprapto	Ret	Ret							0
Pos	Driver	SEN (Indonesia)		SEP (Malaysia)		BHR (Bahrain)		DUB (United Arab Emirates)		Points

Colour	Result
Gold	Winner
Silver	Second place
Bronze	Third place
Green	Points classification
Blue	Non-points classification
Blue	Non-classified finish (NC)
Purple	Retired, not classified (Ret)
Red	Did not qualify (DNQ)
Red	Did not pre-qualify (DNPQ)
Black	Disqualified (DSQ)
White	Did not start (DNS)
White	Withdrew (WD)
White	Race cancelled (C)
Blank	Did not practice (DNP)
Blank	Did not arrive (DNA)
Blank	Excluded (EX)

Notes:

- † – Driver did not finish the race, but was classified as he completed more than 90% of the race distance.
