= 2008 UAE 1st Speedcar Series round =

The layout of the Dubai Autodrome

The 2008 UAE 1st Speedcar Series round was a Speedcar Series motor race held on 25 and 26 January 2008 at Dubai Autodrome in Dubai, United Arab Emirates. It was the first round of the 2008 Speedcar Series. This round was declared a non-championship round as not all of the cars had been updated in time to the FIA crash standards.

== Classification ==
=== Qualifying ===
Pos.	No.	Driver	Team	Time	Gap	Grid
1	10	(Italy) Gianni Morbidelli	Speedcar Team	1:42.558		1
2	21	(Austria) Mathias Lauda	G.P.C. Squadra Corse	1:42.590	+0.032	2
3	20	(France) David Terrien	Union Properties	1:42.612	+0.054	3
4	08	(Germany) Uwe Alzen	Phoenix Racing Team	1:42.747	+0.189	4
5	27	(France) Jean Alesi	Union Properties	1:42.956	+0.398	5
6	85	(United Arab Emirates) Hasher Al Maktoum	Union Properties	1:42.999	+0.441	6
7	71	(France) Nicolas Navarro	Team First Centreville	1:43.099	+0.541	7
8	07	(Japan) Ukyo Katayama	Speedcar Team	1:43.733	+1.175	8
9	18	(Indonesia) Ananda Mikola	Speedcar Team	1.43.863	+1.797	9
10	15	(Sweden) Stefan Johansson	Speedcar Team	1:44.208	+1.722	10
11	17	(France) Fabien Giroix	Team First Centreville	1:45.290	+2.732	11
12	14	(United Kingdom) Johnny Herbert	Speedcar Team	1:47.049	+4.491	12

=== Race 1 ===
Pos.	No.	Driver	Team	Laps	Time/Retired	Grid
1	10	(Italy) Gianni Morbidelli	Speedcar Team	20	34:27.443	1
2	08	(Germany) Uwe Alzen	Phoenix Racing Team	20	+8.364	4
3	21	(Austria) Mathias Lauda	G.P.C. Squadra Corse	20	+9.842	2
4	20	(France) David Terrien	Union Properties	20	+10.577	3
5	85	(United Arab Emirates) Hasher Al Maktoum	Union Properties	20	+17.795	6
6	27	(France) Jean Alesi	Speedcar Team	20	+21.701	5
7	71	(France) Nicolas Navarro	Team First Centreville	20	+33.738	7
8	07	(Sweden) Stefan Johansson	Speedcar Team	20	+42.365	10
9	69	(United Kingdom) Johnny Herbert	Speedcar Team	20	+59.704	12
Ret	18	(Indonesia) Ananda Mikola	Speedcar Team	10	Retired	9
Ret	06	(Japan) Ukyo Katayama	Speedcar Team	7	Retired	8
Ret	17	(France) Fabien Giroix	Team First Centreville	0	Retired	11

=== Race 2 ===
Pos.	No.	Driver	Team	Laps	Time/Retired	Grid
1	10	(Italy) Gianni Morbidelli	Speedcar Team	20	34:40.616	8
2	21	(Austria) Mathias Lauda	G.P.C. Squadra Corse	20	+7.864	6
3	85	(United Arab Emirates) Hasher Al Maktoum	Union Properties	20	+17.148	4
4	17	(France) Fabien Giroix	Team First Centreville	20	+48.196	12
5	06	(Japan) Ukyo Katayama	Speedcar Team	20	+1:21.795	11
6	71	(France) Nicolas Navarro	Team First Centreville	17	+3 laps	2
Ret	18	(Indonesia) Ananda Mikola	Speedcar Team	3	Retired	10
Ret	27	(France) Jean Alesi	Speedcar Team	3	Retired	3
Ret	07	(Sweden) Stefan Johansson	Speedcar Team	2	Retired	1
Ret	69	(United Kingdom) Johnny Herbert	Speedcar Team	1	Retired	9
Ret	20	(France) David Terrien	Union Properties	1	Retired	5
DSQ	08	(Germany) Uwe Alzen	Phoenix Racing Team	17	Disqualified	7

== See also ==
- 2008 UAE 1st GP2 Asia Series round
