= 2008 Bahrain GP2 Asia Series round =

GP2 Asia Series motor race

2008 Bahrain GP2 round
Round details
- Round 4 of 5 rounds in the 2008 GP2 Series
- Location: Bahrain International Circuit in Sakhir, Bahrain
- Course: Permanent racing facility 5.412 km (3.363 mi)

GP2 Series

Feature race
- Date: 5 April 2008
- Laps: 34 (184.008 km)

Pole position
Driver	(France) Romain Grosjean	ART Grand Prix
- Time: 1:42.661

Podium
First	(France) Romain Grosjean	ART Grand Prix
Second	(Switzerland) Sébastien Buemi	Trust Team Arden
Third	(Japan) Kamui Kobayashi	DAMS

Fastest lap
Driver	(France) Romain Grosjean	ART Grand Prix
- Time: 1:45.453 (on lap 9)

Sprint race
- Date: 6 April 2008
- Laps: 23 (124.476 km)

Podium
First	(Japan) Kamui Kobayashi	DAMS
Second	(Switzerland) Sébastien Buemi	Trust Team Arden
Third	(Russia) Vitaly Petrov	Barwa Int Campos Team

Fastest lap
Driver	(Switzerland) Sébastien Buemi	Trust Team Arden
- Time: 1:45.455 (on lap 19)

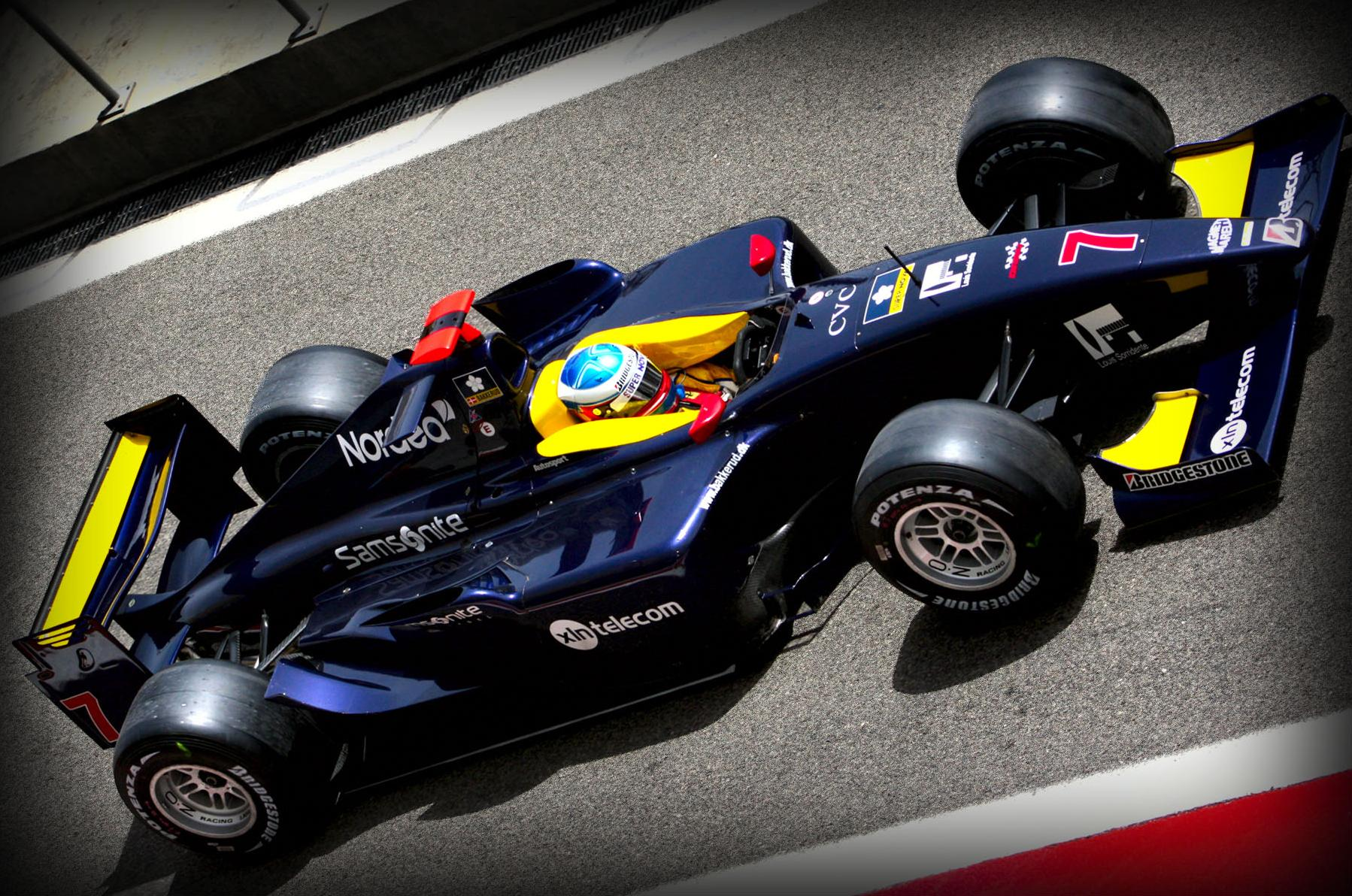
Christian Bakkerud

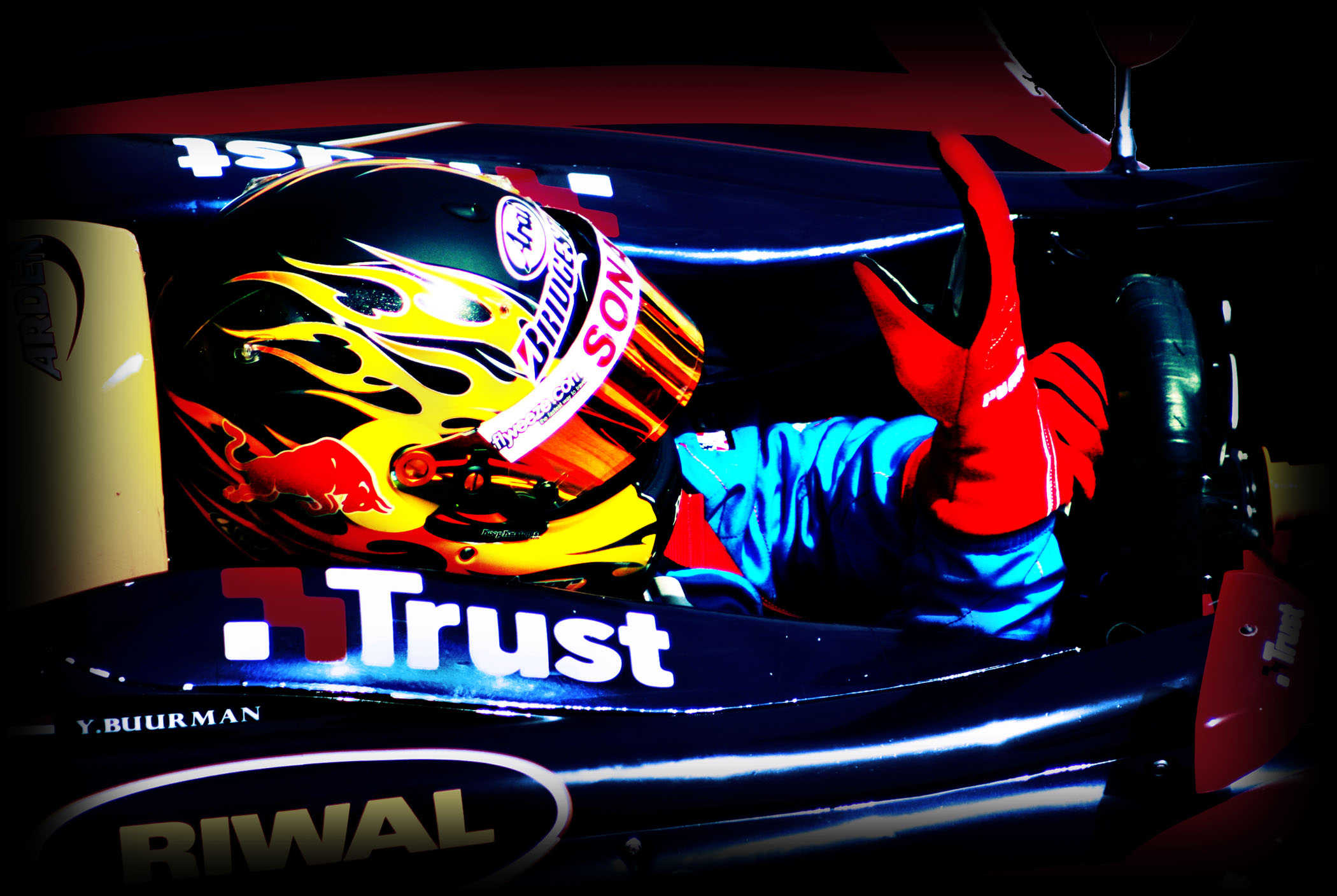
Yelmer Buurman

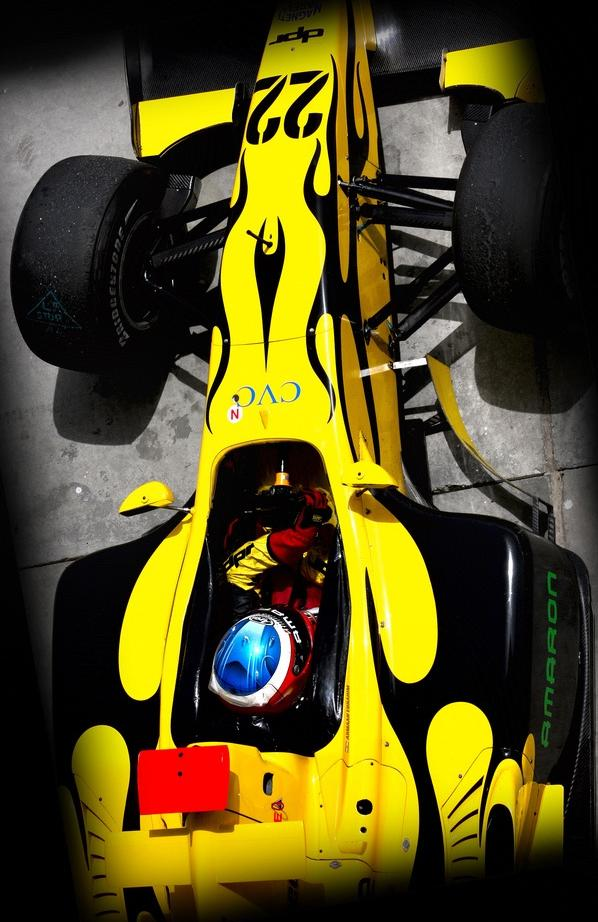
Armaan Ebrahim

The 2008 Bahrain GP2 Asia Series round was a GP2 Asia Series motor race held on 5 and 6 April 2008 at Bahrain International Circuit in Sakhir, Bahrain. It was the fourth round of the 2008 GP2 Asia Series. The race supported the 2008 Bahrain Grand Prix.

== Classification ==
=== Qualifying ===
Pos.	No.	Driver	Team	Time	Gap	Grid
1	4	(France) Romain Grosjean	ART Grand Prix	1:42.661		1
2	1	(India) Karun Chandhok	iSport International	1:43.231	+0.570	2
3	2	(Brazil) Bruno Senna	iSport International	1:43.238	+0.577	3
4	16	(Spain) Adrián Vallés	Fisichella Motor Sport International	1:43.239	+0.578	4
5	10	(Japan) Kamui Kobayashi	DAMS	1:43.277	+0.616	5
6	8	(Malaysia) Fairuz Fauzy	Super Nova Racing	1:43.489	+0.828	6
7	9	(Belgium) Jérôme d'Ambrosio	DAMS	1:43.67	+1.009	7
8	11	(Switzerland) Sébastien Buemi	Trust Team Arden	1:43.698	+1.037	8
9	23	(Brazil) Diego Nunes	DPR	1:43.798	+1.137	9
10	21	(Italy) Marco Bonanomi	Piquet Sports	1:43.800	+1.139	10
11	14	(Italy) Davide Valsecchi	Durango	1:43.906	+1.245	11
12	27	(Italy) Luca Filippi	Qi-Meritus Mahara	1:43.982	+1.321	12
13	12	(Netherlands) Yelmer Buurman	Trust Team Arden	1:44.006	+1.345	13
14	6	(United Kingdom) Ben Hanley	Barwa International Campos Team	1:44.085	+1.424	14
15	5	(Russia) Vitaly Petrov	Barwa International Campos Team	1:44.087	+1.426	15
16	18	(Latvia) Harald Schlegelmilch	Trident Racing	1:44.187	+1.526	16
17	17	(Romania) Michael Herck	Fisichella Motor Sport International	1:44.260	+1.599	17
18	26	(Japan) Hiroki Yoshimoto	Qi-Meritus Mahara	1:44.334	+1.673	18
19	7	(Denmark) Christian Bakkerud	Super Nova Racing	1:44.347	+1.686	19
20	19	(China) Ho-Pin Tung	Trident Racing	1:44.407	+1.746	20
21	15	(Brazil) Alberto Valerio	Durango	1:44.439	+1.778	21
22	20	(Italy) Marcello Puglisi	Piquet Sports	1:44.542	+1.881	22
23	24	(Serbia) Miloš Pavlović	BCN Competicion	1:44.659	+1.998	23
24	25	(Turkey) Jason Tahincioglu	BCN Competicion	1:44.732	+2.071	24
25	22	(India) Armaan Ebrahim	DPR	1:44.845	+2.184	25
26	3	(United Kingdom) Stephen Jelley	ART Grand Prix	1:44.863	+2.202	26

=== Feature race ===
Pos.	No.	Driver	Team	Laps	Time/Retired	Grid	Points
1	4	(France) Romain Grosjean	ART Grand Prix	34	1:04:03.530	1	10+2+1
2	11	(Switzerland) Sébastien Buemi	Trust Team Arden	34	+12.030	8	8
3	10	(Japan) Kamui Kobayashi	DAMS	34	+19.148	5	6
4	2	(Brazil) Bruno Senna	iSport International	34	+27.232	3	5
5	16	(Spain) Adrián Vallés	Fisichella Motor Sport International	34	+29.747	4	4
6	14	(Italy) Davide Valsecchi	Durango	34	+36.657	11	3
7	23	(Brazil) Diego Nunes	DPR	34	+37.226	9	2
8	1	(India) Karun Chandhok	iSport International	34	+39.431	2	1
9	12	(Netherlands) Yelmer Buurman	Trust Team Arden	34	+39.974	13	
10	5	(Russia) Vitaly Petrov	Barwa International Campos Team	34	+42.555	15	
11	9	(Belgium) Jérôme d'Ambrosio	DAMS	34	+43.444	7	
12	26	(Japan) Hiroki Yoshimoto	Qi-Meritus Mahara	34	+49.053	18	
13	22	(India) Armaan Ebrahim	DPR	34	+51.240	25	
14	18	(Latvia) Harald Schlegelmilch	Trident Racing	34	+52.398	16	
15	17	(Romania) Michael Herck	Fisichella Motor Sport International	34	+52.799	17	
16	3	(United Kingdom) Stephen Jelley	ART Grand Prix	34	+59.618	26	
17	25	(Turkey) Jason Tahincioglu	BCN Competicion	34	+1:00.209	24	
18	20	(Italy) Marcello Puglisi	Piquet Sports	34	+1:08.461	22	
19	24	(Serbia) Miloš Pavlović	BCN Competicion	34	+1:28.912	23	
Ret	19	(China) Ho-Pin Tung	Trident Racing	24	Retired	20	
Ret	8	(Malaysia) Fairuz Fauzy	Super Nova Racing	24	Retired	6	
Ret	6	(United Kingdom) Ben Hanley	Barwa International Campos Team	8	Retired	14	
Ret	7	(Denmark) Christian Bakkerud	Super Nova Racing	1	Retired	19	
Ret	21	(Italy) Marco Bonanomi	Piquet Sports	0	Retired	10	
Ret	27	(Italy) Luca Filippi	Qi-Meritus Mahara	0	Retired	12	
DNS	15	(Brazil) Alberto Valerio	Durango	0	Did not start	21	

=== Sprint race ===
Pos.	No.	Driver	Team	Laps	Time/Retired	Grid	Points
1	10	(Japan) Kamui Kobayashi	DAMS	23	40:59.270	6	6
2	11	(Switzerland) Sébastien Buemi	Trust Team Arden	23	+0.861	7	5+1
3	5	(Russia) Vitaly Petrov	Barwa International Campos Team	23	+6.526	10	4
4	26	(Japan) Hiroki Yoshimoto	Qi-Meritus Mahara	23	+9.127	12	3
5	18	(Latvia) Harald Schlegelmilch	Trident Racing	23	+15.801	14	2
6	14	(Italy) Davide Valsecchi	Durango	23	+17.016	3	1
7	19	(China) Ho-Pin Tung	Trident Racing	23	+20.788	20	
8	12	(Netherlands) Yelmer Buurman	Trust Team Arden	23	+21.543	9	
9	3	(United Kingdom) Stephen Jelley	ART Grand Prix	23	+22.669	16	
10	6	(United Kingdom) Ben Hanley	Barwa International Campos Team	23	+28.217	22	
11	27	(Italy) Luca Filippi	Qi-Meritus Mahara	23	+29.337	25	
12	9	(Belgium) Jérôme d'Ambrosio	DAMS	23	+29.406	11	
13	25	(Turkey) Jason Tahincioglu	BCN Competicion	23	+36.450	17	
14	17	(Romania) Michael Herck	Fisichella Motor Sport International	23	+39.022	15	
15	24	(Serbia) Miloš Pavlović	BCN Competicion	23	+49.735	19	
16	22	(India) Armaan Ebrahim	DPR	23	+1:39.993	13	
17	15	(Brazil) Alberto Valerio	Durango	22	+1 lap	26	
Ret	21	(Italy) Marco Bonanomi	Piquet Sports	19	Retired	24	
Ret	4	(France) Romain Grosjean	ART Grand Prix	17	Retired	8	
Ret	1	(India) Karun Chandhok	iSport International	11	Retired	1	
Ret	16	(Spain) Adrián Vallés	Fisichella Motor Sport International	7	Retired	4	
Ret	7	(Denmark) Christian Bakkerud	Super Nova Racing	3	Retired	23	
Ret	20	(Italy) Marcello Puglisi	Piquet Sports	1	Retired	18	
Ret	23	(Brazil) Diego Nunes	DPR	1	Retired	2	
Ret	8	(Malaysia) Fairuz Fauzy	Super Nova Racing	0	Retired	21	
DNS	2	(Brazil) Bruno Senna	iSport International	0	Did not start	5	

== Standings after the event ==
Drivers' Championship standings

	Pos.	Driver	Points
	1	(France) Romain Grosjean	48
	2	(Russia) Vitaly Petrov	28
4	3	(Switzerland) Sébastien Buemi	24
1	4	(Malaysia) Fairuz Fauzy	23
1	5	(Brazil) Bruno Senna	23

Teams' Championship standings

	Pos.	Team	Points
	1	(France) ART Grand Prix	48
	2	(Spain) Barwa International Campos Team	34
	3	(United Kingdom) iSport International	30
3	4	(Netherlands) Trust Team Arden	29
	5	(France) DAMS	28

- Note: Only the top five positions are included for both sets of standings.

== See also ==
- 2008 Bahrain Grand Prix
- 2008 Bahrain Speedcar Series round

Previous round: 2008 Malaysian GP2 Asia Series round	GP2 Asia Series Championship; 2008 season	Next round: 2008 UAE 2nd GP2 Asia Series round
Previous round: 2007 Bahrain GP2 Series round	Bahrain GP2 Asia Series round	Next round: 2009 Bahrain 1st GP2 Asia Series round
