= 2008 UAE 2nd Speedcar Series round =

The layout of the Dubai Autodrome

The 2008 UAE 2nd Speedcar Series round was a Speedcar Series motor race held on 11 and 12 April 2008 at Dubai Autodrome in Dubai, United Arab Emirates. It was the fifth round of the 2008 Speedcar Series.

== Classification ==
=== Qualifying ===
Pos.	No.	Driver	Team	Time	Gap	Grid
1	71	(France) Nicolas Navarro	Team First Centreville	2:06.703		1
2	10	(Italy) Gianni Morbidelli	Speedcar Team	2:07.042	+0.339	2
3	27	(France) Jean Alesi	Speedcar Team	2:07.043	+0.340	3
4	20	(France) David Terrien	Union Properties	2:07.398	+0.695	4
5	69	(United Kingdom) Johnny Herbert	Speedcar Team	2:07.418	+0.715	5
6	50	(Hong Kong) Marchy Lee	Speedcar Team	2:07.561	+0.858	6
7	08	(Germany) Uwe Alzen	Phoenix Racing Team	2:07.997	+1.294	7
8	07	(Sweden) Stefan Johansson	Speedcar Team	2:08.278	+1.575	8
9	96	(Canada) Jacques Villeneuve	Speedcar Team	2:08.701	+1.998	9
10	85	(United Arab Emirates) Hasher Al Maktoum	Union Properties	2:08.879	+2.176	10
11	90	(Finland) Jyrki Järvilehto	Speedcar Team	2:08.901	+2.198	11
12	06	(Japan) Ukyo Katayama	Speedcar Team	2:10.074	+3.371	12
13	09	(Portugal) Pedro Lamy	Speedcar Team	2:13.860	+7.157	13
14	17	(France) Fabien Giroix	Team First Centreville	No time		14
15	18	(Indonesia) Ananda Mikola	Speedcar Team	No time		15

=== Race 1 ===
Pos.	No.	Driver	Team	Laps	Time/Retired	Grid	Points
1	69	(United Kingdom) Johnny Herbert	Speedcar Team	19	40:40.518	5	10
2	20	(France) David Terrien	Union Properties	19	+0.731	4	8
3	10	(Italy) Gianni Morbidelli	Speedcar Team	19	+7.329	2	6
4	08	(Germany) Uwe Alzen	Phoenix Racing Team	19	+10.824	7	5
5	50	(Hong Kong) Marchy Lee	Speedcar Team	19	+15.440	6	4
6	71	(France) Nicolas Navarro	Team First Centreville	19	+20.658	1	3
7	85	(United Arab Emirates) Hasher Al Maktoum	Union Properties	19	+22.311	10	2
8	07	(Sweden) Stefan Johansson	Speedcar Team	19	+23.630	8	1
9	85	(Canada) Jacques Villeneuve	Speedcar Team	19	+29.082	9	
10	17	(France) Fabien Giroix	Team First Centreville	19	+32.902	14	
11	10	(Finland) Jyrki Järvilehto	Speedcar Team	19	+42.632	11	
12	06	(Japan) Ukyo Katayama	Speedcar Team	19	+52.673	12	
13	09	(Portugal) Pedro Lamy	Speedcar Team	19	+1:02.224	13	
Ret	27	(France) Jean Alesi	Speedcar Team	11	Retired	3	
Ret	18	(Indonesia) Ananda Mikola	Speedcar Team	2	Retired	15	

=== Race 2 ===
Pos.	No.	Driver	Team	Laps	Time/Retired	Grid	Points
1	69	(United Kingdom) Johnny Herbert	Speedcar Team	19	40:18.738	8	10
2	20	(France) David Terrien	Union Properties	19	+6.999	7	8
3	50	(Hong Kong) Marchy Lee	Speedcar Team	19	+9.381	4	6
4	10	(Italy) Gianni Morbidelli	Speedcar Team	19	+12.150	6	5
5	71	(France) Nicolas Navarro	Team First Centreville	19	+23.677	3	4
6	17	(France) Fabien Giroix	Team First Centreville	19	+26.238	10	3
7	18	(Indonesia) Ananda Mikola	Speedcar Team	19	+28.601	15	2
8	10	(Finland) Jyrki Järvilehto	Speedcar Team	19	+35.176	11	1
9	07	(Sweden) Stefan Johansson	Speedcar Team	19	+43.992	1	
10	09	(Portugal) Pedro Lamy	Speedcar Team	19	+1:00.907	13	
11	08	(Germany) Uwe Alzen	Phoenix Racing Team	19	+1:45.098	5	
12	85	(United Arab Emirates) Hasher Al Maktoum	Union Properties	18	+1 lap	2	
Ret	27	(France) Jean Alesi	Speedcar Team	5	Retired	14	
Ret	06	(Japan) Ukyo Katayama	Speedcar Team	2	Retired	12	
Ret	85	(Canada) Jacques Villeneuve	Speedcar Team	2	Retired	9	

== See also ==
- 2008 UAE 2nd GP2 Asia Series round
