= 2008 Malaysian GP2 Asia Series round =

(Malaysia) 2008 Malaysian GP2 round
Round details
- Round 3 of 5 rounds in the 2008 GP2 Series
- Location: Sepang International Circuit in Sepang, Malaysia
- Course: Permanent racing facility 5.543 km (3.445 mi)

GP2 Series

Feature race
- Date: 22 March 2008
- Laps: 33 (182.919 km)

Pole position
Driver	(France) Romain Grosjean	ART Grand Prix
- Time: 1:44.182

Podium
First	(Russia) Vitaly Petrov	Barwa Int Campos Team
Second	(Malaysia) Fairuz Fauzy	Super Nova Racing
Third	(Belgium) Jérôme d'Ambrosio	DAMS

Fastest lap
Driver	(France) Romain Grosjean	ART Grand Prix
- Time: 1:46.405 (on lap 33)

Sprint race
- Date: 23 March 2008
- Laps: 22 (121.946 km)

Podium
First	(Japan) Kamui Kobayashi	DAMS
Second	(France) Romain Grosjean	ART Grand Prix
Third	(Russia) Vitaly Petrov	Barwa Int Campos Team

Fastest lap
Driver	(Brazil) Bruno Senna	iSport International
- Time: 1:46.548 (on lap 20)

The 2008 Malaysian GP2 Asia Series round was a GP2 Asia Series motor race held on 22 and 23 March 2008 at Sepang International Circuit in Sepang, Malaysia. It was the third round of the 2008 GP2 Asia Series. The race supported the 2008 Malaysian Grand Prix.

== Classification ==
=== Qualifying ===
Pos.	No.	Driver	Team	Time	Gap	Grid
1	4	(France) Romain Grosjean	ART Grand Prix	1:44.182		1
2	1	(India) Karun Chandhok	iSport International	1:44.965	+0.783	2
3	16	(Spain) Adrián Vallés	Fisichella Motor Sport International	1:45.035	+0.853	3
4	2	(Brazil) Bruno Senna	iSport International	1:45.094	+0.912	4
5	27	(Italy) Luca Filippi	Qi-Meritus Mahara	1:45.166	+0.984	10^{1}
6	11	(Switzerland) Sébastien Buemi	Trust Team Arden	1:45.182	+1.000	5
7	8	(Malaysia) Fairuz Fauzy	Super Nova Racing	1:45.367	+1.185	6
8	10	(Japan) Kamui Kobayashi	DAMS	1:45.401	+1.219	7
9	14	(Italy) Davide Valsecchi	Durango	1:45.471	+1.289	8
10	12	(Netherlands) Yelmer Buurman	Trust Team Arden	1:45.560	+1.378	9
11	7	(Denmark) Christian Bakkerud	Super Nova Racing	1:45.576	+1.394	11
12	5	(Russia) Vitaly Petrov	Barwa International Campos Team	1:45.668	+1.486	15^{1}
13	19	(China) Ho-Pin Tung	Trident Racing	1:45.704	+1.522	12
14	26	(Japan) Hiroki Yoshimoto	Qi-Meritus Mahara	1:45.719	+1.537	19^{1}
15	6	(United Kingdom) Ben Hanley	Barwa International Campos Team	1:45.879	+1.697	13
16	3	(United Kingdom) Stephen Jelley	ART Grand Prix	1:45.901	+1.719	14
17	15	(Brazil) Alberto Valerio	Durango	1:45.932	+1.750	16
18	9	(Belgium) Jérôme d'Ambrosio	DAMS	1:46.019	+1.837	17
19	18	(Latvia) Harald Schlegelmilch	Trident Racing	1:46.069	+1.887	18
20	24	(Serbia) Miloš Pavlović	BCN Competicion	1:46.093	+1.911	20
21	23	(Brazil) Diego Nunes	DPR	1:46.186	+2.004	21
22	17	(Romania) Michael Herck	Fisichella Motor Sport International	1:46.258	+2.076	22
23	21	(Italy) Marco Bonanomi	Piquet Sports	1:46.281	+2.099	23
24	25	(Turkey) Jason Tahincioglu	BCN Competicion	1:46.710	+2.528	26^{1}
25	20	(Italy) Marcello Puglisi	Piquet Sports	1:46.923	+2.741	24
26	22	(India) Armaan Ebrahim	DPR	1:47.720	+3.538	25

Notes

- ^1 – Luca Filippi, Vitaly Petrov, Hiroki Yoshimoto and Jason Tahincioglu received five place grid penalty for disregarding yellow flags during free practice.

=== Feature race ===
Pos.	No.	Driver	Team	Laps	Time/Retired	Grid	Points
1	5	(Russia) Vitaly Petrov	Barwa International Campos Team	33	1:27.39.378	15	10
2	8	(Malaysia) Fairuz Fauzy	Super Nova Racing	33	+6.531	6	8
3	9	(Belgium) Jérôme d'Ambrosio	DAMS	33	+7.725	17	6
4	14	(Italy) Davide Valsecchi	Durango	33	+11.010	8	5
5	10	(Japan) Kamui Kobayashi	DAMS	33	+11.328	7	4
6	12	(Netherlands) Yelmer Buurman	Trust Team Arden	33	+15.262	9	3
7	24	(Serbia) Miloš Pavlović	BCN Competicion	33	+35.862	20	2
8	18	(Latvia) Harald Schlegelmilch	Trident Racing	33	+41.267	18	1
9	4	(France) Romain Grosjean	ART Grand Prix	33	+51.129	1	2+1
10	23	(Brazil) Diego Nunes	DPR	32	+1 lap	21	
11	17	(Romania) Michael Herck	Fisichella Motor Sport International	32	+1 lap	22	
12	25	(Turkey) Jason Tahincioglu	BCN Competicion	32	+1 lap	26	
13	20	(Italy) Marcello Puglisi	Piquet Sports	32	+1 lap	24	
Ret	22	(India) Armaan Ebrahim	DPR	26	Retired	25	
Ret	1	(India) Karun Chandhok	iSport International	26	Retired	2	
Ret	19	(China) Ho-Pin Tung	Trident Racing	23	Retired	12	
Ret	16	(Spain) Adrián Vallés	Fisichella Motor Sport International	22	Retired	3	
Ret	11	(Switzerland) Sébastien Buemi	Trust Team Arden	22	Retired	5	
Ret	7	(Denmark) Christian Bakkerud	Super Nova Racing	21	Retired	11	
Ret	2	(Brazil) Bruno Senna	iSport International	5	Retired	4	
Ret	3	(United Kingdom) Stephen Jelley	ART Grand Prix	4	Retired	14	
Ret	26	(Japan) Hiroki Yoshimoto	Qi-Meritus Mahara	2	Retired	19	
Ret	27	(Italy) Luca Filippi	Qi-Meritus Mahara	0	Retired	10	
Ret	6	(United Kingdom) Ben Hanley	Barwa International Campos Team	0	Retired	13	
Ret	15	(Brazil) Alberto Valerio	Durango	0	Retired	16	
Ret	21	(Italy) Marco Bonanomi	Piquet Sports	0	Retired	23	

=== Sprint race ===
Pos.	No.	Driver	Team	Laps	Time/Retired	Grid	Points
1	10	(Japan) Kamui Kobayashi	DAMS	22	39:31.347	4	6
2	4	(France) Romain Grosjean	ART Grand Prix	22	+4.001	9	5
3	5	(Russia) Vitaly Petrov	Barwa International Campos Team	22	+11.608	8	4
4	14	(Italy) Davide Valsecchi	Durango	22	+12.417	5	3
5	12	(Netherlands) Yelmer Buurman	Trust Team Arden	22	+21.986	3	2
6	8	(Malaysia) Fairuz Fauzy	Super Nova Racing	22	+26.080	7	1
7	1	(India) Karun Chandhok	iSport International	22	+26.488	15	
8	2	(Brazil) Bruno Senna	iSport International	22	+30.608	19	1
9	20	(Italy) Marcello Puglisi	Piquet Sports	22	+39.353	13	
10	26	(Japan) Hiroki Yoshimoto	Qi-Meritus Mahara	22	+39.488	21	
11	17	(Romania) Michael Herck	Fisichella Motor Sport International	22	+40.371	11	
12	24	(Serbia) Miloš Pavlović	BCN Competicion	22	+41.385	2	
13	23	(Brazil) Diego Nunes	DPR	22	+41.996	10	
14	6	(United Kingdom) Ben Hanley	Barwa International Campos Team	22	+42.187	23	
15	21	(Italy) Marco Bonanomi	Piquet Sports	22	+42.770	25	
16	19	(China) Ho-Pin Tung	Trident Racing	22	+44.456	16	
17	15	(Brazil) Alberto Valerio	Durango	22	+48.833	24	
18	3	(United Kingdom) Stephen Jelley	ART Grand Prix	22	+49.290	20	
19	22	(India) Armaan Ebrahim	DPR	22	+1:14.908	14	
20	16	(Spain) Adrián Vallés	Fisichella Motor Sport International	21	+1 lap	17	
Ret	27	(Italy) Luca Filippi	Qi-Meritus Mahara	18	Retired	22	
Ret	11	(Switzerland) Sébastien Buemi	Trust Team Arden	18	Retired	18	
Ret	18	(Latvia) Harald Schlegelmilch	Trident Racing	4	Retired	1	
Ret	25	(Turkey) Jason Tahincioglu	BCN Competicion	0	Retired	12	
Ret	9	(Belgium) Jérôme d'Ambrosio	DAMS	0	Retired	6	
DNS	7	(Denmark) Christian Bakkerud	Super Nova Racing	0	Did not start^{2}		

Notes

- ^2 – Christian Bakkerud was excluded from the race for ignoring the marshals in the feature race.

== Standings after the event ==
Drivers' Championship standings

	Pos.	Driver	Points
	1	(France) Romain Grosjean	35
4	2	(Russia) Vitaly Petrov	24
1	3	(Malaysia) Fairuz Fauzy	23
2	4	(Brazil) Bruno Senna	18
2	5	(Spain) Adrián Vallés	15

Teams' Championship standings

	Pos.	Team	Points
	1	(France) ART Grand Prix	35
1	2	(Spain) Barwa International Campos Team	30
1	3	(United Kingdom) iSport International	24
1	4	(United Kingdom) Super Nova Racing	23
7	5	(France) DAMS	16

- Note: Only the top five positions are included for both sets of standings.

== See also ==
- 2008 Malaysian Grand Prix
- 2008 Malaysian Speedcar Series round

Previous round: 2008 Indonesian GP2 Asia Series round	GP2 Asia Series Championship; 2008 season	Next round: 2008 Bahrain GP2 Asia Series round
Previous round: None	Malaysian GP2 Asia Series round	Next round: 2009 Malaysian GP2 Asia Series round
