= 2008 UAE 2nd GP2 Asia Series round =

Motorsport race

(United Arab Emirates) 2008 UAE GP2 round
Round details
- Round 5 of 5 rounds in the 2008 GP2 Series
- Location: Dubai Autodrome in Dubai, United Arab Emirates
- Course: Permanent racing facility 5.390 km (3.349 mi)

GP2 Series

Feature race
- Date: 11 April 2008
- Laps: 34 (183.260 km)

Pole position
Driver	(France) Romain Grosjean	ART Grand Prix
- Time: 1:40.887

Podium
First	(France) Romain Grosjean	ART Grand Prix
Second	(Switzerland) Sébastien Buemi	Trust Team Arden
Third	(Netherlands) Yelmer Buurman	Trust Team Arden

Fastest lap
Driver	(France) Romain Grosjean	ART Grand Prix
- Time: 1:42.154 (on lap 32)

Sprint race
- Date: 12 April 2008
- Laps: 23 (123.970 km)

Podium
First	(Italy) Marco Bonanomi	Piquet Sports
Second	(Switzerland) Sébastien Buemi	Trust Team Arden
Third	(Belgium) Jérôme d'Ambrosio	DAMS

Fastest lap
Driver	(Japan) Kamui Kobayashi (Note: Kamui Kobayashi set the fastest lap, but did not finish in the top 10, so was ineligible to be the point-scorer for the fastest lap. Davide Valsecchi was the point-scorer instead for setting the fastest lap of those finishing in the top 10.)	DAMS
- Time: 1:41.220 (on lap 22)

The 2008 UAE 2nd GP2 Asia Series round was a GP2 Asia Series motor race held on 11 and 12 April 2008 at Dubai Autodrome in Dubai, United Arab Emirates. It was the final round of the 2008 GP2 Asia Series.

== Classification ==
=== Qualifying ===
Pos.	No.	Driver	Team	Time	Gap	Grid
1	4	(France) Romain Grosjean	ART Grand Prix	1:40.887		1
2	2	(Brazil) Bruno Senna	iSport International	1:41.095	+0.208	2
3	10	(Japan) Kamui Kobayashi	DAMS	1:41.224	+0.337	3
4	21	(Italy) Marco Bonanomi	Piquet Sports	1:41.629	+0.742	4
5	26	(Japan) Hiroki Yoshimoto	Qi-Meritus Mahara	1:41.819	+0.932	5
6	12	(Netherlands) Yelmer Buurman	Trust Team Arden	1:41.819	+0.932	6
7	5	(Russia) Vitaly Petrov	Barwa International Campos Team	1:41.836	+0.949	7
8	11	(Switzerland) Sébastien Buemi	Trust Team Arden	1:41.870	+0.983	8
9	27	(Italy) Luca Filippi	Qi-Meritus Mahara	1:41.962	+1.075	9
10	14	(Italy) Davide Valsecchi	Durango	1:41.988	+1.101	10
11	25	(Turkey) Jason Tahincioglu	BCN Competicion	1:41.998	+1.111	11
12	15	(Brazil) Alberto Valerio	Durango	1:42.056	+1.169	12
13	1	(India) Karun Chandhok	iSport International	1:42.063	+1.176	13
14	9	(Belgium) Jérôme d'Ambrosio	DAMS	1:42.089	+1.202	14
15	24	(Serbia) Miloš Pavlović	BCN Competicion	1:42.136	+1.249	15
16	18	(Latvia) Harald Schlegelmilch	Trident Racing	1:42.223	+1.336	16
17	19	(China) Ho-Pin Tung	Trident Racing	1:42.301	+1.414	17
18	16	(Spain) Adrián Vallés	Fisichella Motor Sport International	1:42.358	+1.471	18
19	8	(Malaysia) Fairuz Fauzy	Super Nova Racing	1:42.440	+1.553	19
20	7	(Denmark) Christian Bakkerud	Super Nova Racing	1:42.652	+1.765	20
21	6	(United Kingdom) Ben Hanley	Barwa International Campos Team	1:42.657	+1.770	21
22	3	(United Kingdom) Stephen Jelley	ART Grand Prix	1:42.697	+1.810	22
23	20	(Italy) Marcello Puglisi	Piquet Sports	1:42.717	+1.830	23
24	22	(India) Armaan Ebrahim	DPR	1:42.866	+1.979	24
25	17	(Spain) Roldán Rodríguez	Fisichella Motor Sport International	1:43.254	+2.367	25
26	23	(Brazil) Diego Nunes	DPR	1:43.839	+2.952	26

=== Feature race ===
Pos.	No.	Driver	Team	Laps	Time/Retired	Grid	Points
1	4	(France) Romain Grosjean	ART Grand Prix	34	59:37.711	1	10+2+1
2	11	(Switzerland) Sébastien Buemi	Trust Team Arden	34	+1.933	8	8
3	12	(Netherlands) Yelmer Buurman	Trust Team Arden	34	+3.549	6	6
4	5	(Russia) Vitaly Petrov	Barwa International Campos Team	34	+4.114	7	5
5	26	(Japan) Hiroki Yoshimoto	Qi-Meritus Mahara	34	+11.364	5	4
6	21	(Italy) Marco Bonanomi	Piquet Sports	34	+12.051	4	3
7	9	(Belgium) Jérôme d'Ambrosio	DAMS	34	+12.596	14	2
8	24	(Serbia) Miloš Pavlović	BCN Competicion	34	+13.021	15	1
9	25	(Turkey) Jason Tahincioglu	BCN Competicion	34	+29.598	11	
10	19	(China) Ho-Pin Tung	Trident Racing	34	+30.597	17	
11	8	(Malaysia) Fairuz Fauzy	Super Nova Racing	34	+30.744	19	
12	27	(Italy) Luca Filippi	Qi-Meritus Mahara	34	+31.334	9	
13	15	(Brazil) Alberto Valerio	Durango	34	+38.482	12	
14	14	(Italy) Davide Valsecchi	Durango	34	+47.037	10	
15	17	(Spain) Roldán Rodríguez	Fisichella Motor Sport International	34	+48.474	25	
16	18	(Latvia) Harald Schlegelmilch	Trident Racing	34	+48.575	16	
17	23	(Brazil) Diego Nunes	DPR	34	+56.747	26	
18	3	(United Kingdom) Stephen Jelley	ART Grand Prix	34	+1:30.631	22	
19	22	(India) Armaan Ebrahim	DPR	33	+1 lap	24	
20	10	(Japan) Kamui Kobayashi	DAMS	31	+3 laps	3	
Ret	6	(United Kingdom) Ben Hanley	Barwa International Campos Team	27	Retired	21	
Ret	1	(India) Karun Chandhok	iSport International	23	Retired	13	
Ret	7	(Denmark) Christian Bakkerud	Super Nova Racing	19	Retired	20	
Ret	20	(Italy) Marcello Puglisi	Piquet Sports	10	Retired	23	
Ret	16	(Spain) Adrián Vallés	Fisichella Motor Sport International	7	Retired	18	
DSQ	2	(Brazil) Bruno Senna	iSport International	34	Disqualified^{1}	2	

Notes

- ^1 – Bruno Senna finished ninth but was disqualified for changing only one tyre during a pit stop.

=== Sprint race ===
Pos.	No.	Driver	Team	Laps	Time/Retired	Grid	Points
1	21	(Italy) Marco Bonanomi	Piquet Sports	23	45:08.527	3	6
2	11	(Switzerland) Sébastien Buemi	Trust Team Arden	23	+0.516	7	5
3	9	(Belgium) Jérôme d'Ambrosio	DAMS	23	+5.361	2	4
4	14	(Italy) Davide Valsecchi	Durango	23	+8.445	14	3+1
5	12	(Netherlands) Yelmer Buurman	Trust Team Arden	23	+12.550	6	2
6	8	(Malaysia) Fairuz Fauzy	Super Nova Racing	23	+12.836	11	1
7	18	(Latvia) Harald Schlegelmilch	Trident Racing	23	+14.306	16	
8	25	(Turkey) Jason Tahincioglu	BCN Competicion	23	+15.948	9	
9	7	(Denmark) Christian Bakkerud	Super Nova Racing	23	+16.474	23	
10	16	(Spain) Adrián Vallés	Fisichella Motor Sport International	23	+16.934	25	
11	2	(Brazil) Bruno Senna	iSport International	23	+17.214	26	
12	23	(Brazil) Diego Nunes	DPR	23	+18.895	17	
13	26	(Japan) Hiroki Yoshimoto	Qi-Meritus Mahara	23	+22.225	4	
14	10	(Japan) Kamui Kobayashi	DAMS	23	+26.212	20	
15	15	(Brazil) Alberto Valerio	Durango	22	+1 lap	13	
Ret	5	(Russia) Vitaly Petrov	Barwa International Campos Team	17	Retired	4	
Ret	17	(Spain) Roldán Rodríguez	Fisichella Motor Sport International	13	Retired	15	
Ret	4	(France) Romain Grosjean	ART Grand Prix	10	Retired	8	
Ret	1	(India) Karun Chandhok	iSport International	5	Retired	22	
Ret	22	(India) Armaan Ebrahim	DPR	4	Retired	19	
Ret	6	(United Kingdom) Ben Hanley	Barwa International Campos Team	4	Retired	21	
Ret	20	(Italy) Marcello Puglisi	Piquet Sports	2	Retired	24	
Ret	24	(Serbia) Miloš Pavlović	BCN Competicion	0	Retired	1	
Ret	27	(Italy) Luca Filippi	Qi-Meritus Mahara	0	Retired	12	
DNS	3	(United Kingdom) Stephen Jelley	ART Grand Prix	0	Did not start^{2}	18	
DSQ	19	(China) Ho-Pin Tung	Trident Racing	23	Disqualified^{3}	10	

Notes

- ^2 – Stephen Jelley did not start due to taking part in BTCC round at Rockingham.
- ^3 – Ho-Pin Tung finished fifth, but was disqualified because the car's right hand side skirt was too low.

== Standings after the event ==
Drivers' Championship standings

	Pos.	Driver	Points
	1	(France) Romain Grosjean	61
1	2	(Switzerland) Sébastien Buemi	37
1	3	(Russia) Vitaly Petrov	33
	4	(Malaysia) Fairuz Fauzy	24
	5	(Brazil) Bruno Senna	23

Teams' Championship standings

	Pos.	Team	Points
	1	(France) ART Grand Prix	61
2	2	(Netherlands) Trust Team Arden	50
1	3	(Spain) Barwa International Campos Team	39
1	4	(France) DAMS	34
2	5	(United Kingdom) iSport International	30

- Note: Only the top five positions are included for both sets of standings.

== See also ==
- 2008 UAE 2nd Speedcar Series round

== Notes ==
Previous round: 2008 Bahrain GP2 Asia Series round	GP2 Asia Series Championship; 2008 season	Next round: 2008 Chinese GP2 Asia Series round
Previous round: 2008 UAE 1st GP2 Asia Series round	UAE GP2 Asia Series round	Next round: 2008 UAE 3rd GP2 Asia Series round
