= 2008 Bahrain Speedcar Series round =

Car racing series

The Grand Prix layout of the Bahrain International Circuit

The 2008 Bahrain Speedcar Series round was the fourth round of the 2008 Speedcar Series. It was held on 5 and 6 April 2008 at Bahrain International Circuit in Sakhir, Bahrain. The race supported the 2008 Bahrain Grand Prix.

== Classification ==
=== Qualifying ===
Pos.	No.	Driver	Team	Time	Gap	Grid
1	69	(United Kingdom) Johnny Herbert	Speedcar Team	2:07.007		1
2	07	(Sweden) Stefan Johansson	Speedcar Team	2:07.028	+0.021	2
3	71	(France) Nicolas Navarro	Team First Centreville	2:07.375	+0.368	3
4	08	(Germany) Uwe Alzen	Phoenix Racing Team	2:07.810	+0.803	4
5	10	(Italy) Gianni Morbidelli	Speedcar Team	2:07.843	+0.836	5
6	20	(France) David Terrien	Union Properties	2:07.911	+0.904	6
7	27	(France) Jean Alesi	Speedcar Team	2:08.115	+1.108	7
8	50	(Hong Kong) Marchy Lee	Speedcar Team	2:08.766	+1.759	8
9	85	(United Arab Emirates) Hasher Al Maktoum	Union Properties	2:09.082	+2.075	9
10	80	(Germany) Heinz-Harald Frentzen	Phoenix Racing Team	2:09.214	+2.207	10
11	90	(Finland) Jyrki Järvilehto	Speedcar Team	2:09.420	+2.413	11
12	06	(Japan) Ukyo Katayama	Speedcar Team	2:09.688	+2.681	12
13	12	(Germany) Klaus Ludwig	G.P.C. Squadra Corse	2:09.964	+2.597	13
14	96	(Canada) Jacques Villeneuve	Speedcar Team	2:10.276	+3.269	14
15	17	(France) Fabien Giroix	Team First Centreville	2:10.306	+3.299	15
16	18	(Indonesia) Ananda Mikola	Speedcar Team	2:10.310	+3.303	16

=== Race 1 ===
Pos.	No.	Driver	Team	Laps	Time/Retired	Grid	Points
1	20	(France) David Terrien	Union Properties	19	41:19.395	6	10
2	10	(Italy) Gianni Morbidelli	Speedcar Team	19	+4.894	5	8
3	71	(France) Nicolas Navarro	Team First Centreville	19	+10.178	3	6
4	50	(Hong Kong) Marchy Lee	Speedcar Team	19	+15.940	8	5
5	69	(United Kingdom) Johnny Herbert	Speedcar Team	19	+25.266	1	4
6	96	(Canada) Jacques Villeneuve	Speedcar Team	19	+26.332	14	3
7	85	(United Arab Emirates) Hasher Al Maktoum	Union Properties	19	+35.561	9	2
8	06	(Japan) Ukyo Katayama	Speedcar Team	19	+37.762	12	1
9	07	(Sweden) Stefan Johansson	Speedcar Team	16	DNF	2	
10	27	(France) Jean Alesi	Speedcar Team	16	DNF	7	
11	80	(Germany) Heinz-Harald Frentzen	Speedcar Team	14	DNF	10	
Ret	18	(Indonesia) Ananda Mikola	Speedcar Team	12	DNF	16	
Ret	17	(France) Fabien Giroix	Team First Centreville	3	DNF	15	
Ret	12	(Germany) Klaus Ludwig	G.P.C. Squadra Corse	1	DNF	13	
Ret	12	(Finland) Jyrki Järvilehto	G.P.C. Squadra Corse	1	DNF	11	
DSQ	08	(Germany) Uwe Alzen	Phoenix Racing Team	19	Disqualified	4	

=== Race 2 ===
Pos.	No.	Driver	Team	Laps	Time/Retired	Grid	Points
1	10	(Italy) Gianni Morbidelli	Speedcar Team	19	41:18.421	7	10
2	08	(Germany) Uwe Alzen	Phoenix Racing Team	19	+1.511	16	8
3	27	(France) Jean Alesi	Speedcar Team	19	+10.253	10	6
4	17	(France) Fabien Giroix	Team First Centreville	19	+33.663	13	5
5	18	(Indonesia) Ananda Mikola	Speedcar Team	19	+36.416	12	4
6	12	(Germany) Klaus Ludwig	G.P.C. Squadra Corse	19	+54.356	14	3
7	71	(France) Nicolas Navarro	Team First Centreville	18	+1 Lap	6	2
8	07	(Sweden) Stefan Johansson	Speedcar Team	18	+1 Lap	9	1
9	80	(Germany) Heinz-Harald Frentzen	Speedcar Team	18	+1 Lap	11	
Ret	69	(United Kingdom) Johnny Herbert	Speedcar Team	9	DNF	4	
Ret	50	(Hong Kong) Marchy Lee	Speedcar Team	8	DNF	5	
Ret	12	(Finland) Jyrki Järvilehto	G.P.C. Squadra Corse	5	DNF	15	
Ret	06	(Japan) Ukyo Katayama	Speedcar Team	3	DNF	1	
Ret	96	(Canada) Jacques Villeneuve	Speedcar Team	1	DNF	3	
Ret	20	(France) David Terrien	Union Properties	1	DNF	8	
Ret	85	(United Arab Emirates) Hasher Al Maktoum	Union Properties	1	DNF	2	

== See also ==
- 2008 Bahrain Grand Prix
- 2008 Bahrain GP2 Asia Series round
