= 2008 GP2 Asia Series =

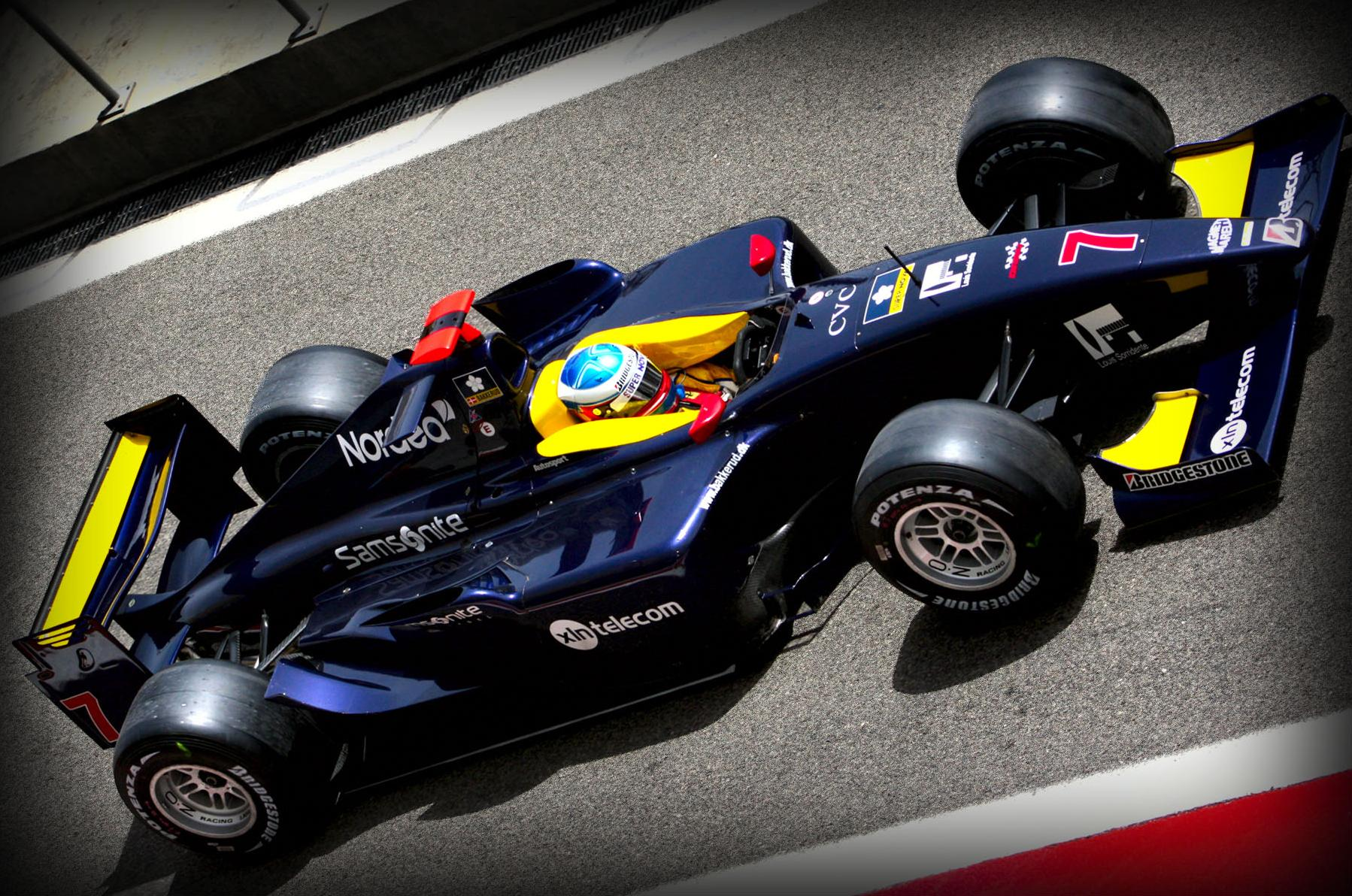
Christian Bakkerud driving for Super Nova at the 2008 Bahrain GP2 Asia Series round.

The 2008 GP2 Asia Series season was the first GP2 Asia Series season. It started on 25 January and ended on 12 April.

== Season summary ==
Romain Grosjean became the champion despite his teammate Stephen Jelley scoring no points, with their team, ART Grand Prix, winning the teams' title.

In this season, only two drivers scored pole positions. Grosjean took pole in all but one race in Sentul, where Vitaly Petrov secured the first position on the grid. The Frenchman also won four races, including a clean sweep in Dubai and the feature race in Sakhir.

Kamui Kobayashi won two sprint races in Sepang and Sakhir, while Sébastien Buemi won the feature race in Sentul. Marco Bonanomi and Fairuz Fauzy won a sprint race each.

== Teams and drivers ==
All of the teams used the Dallara GP2/05 chassis with Renault-badged 4.0 litre (244 cu in) naturally-aspirated Mecachrome V8 engines order and with tyres supplied by Bridgestone.

Team	No.	Driver	Rounds
(United Kingdom) iSport International	1	(India) Karun Chandhok	All
(United Kingdom) iSport International	2	(Brazil) Bruno Senna	All
(France) ART Grand Prix	3	(United Kingdom) Stephen Jelley	All
(France) ART Grand Prix	4	(France) Romain Grosjean	All
(Spain) Barwa International Campos Team	5	(Russia) Vitaly Petrov	All
(Spain) Barwa International Campos Team	6	(Brazil) Diego Nunes	1
(Spain) Barwa International Campos Team	6	(United Kingdom) Ben Hanley	2–5
(United Kingdom) Super Nova Racing	7	(Denmark) Christian Bakkerud	All
(United Kingdom) Super Nova Racing	8	(Malaysia) Fairuz Fauzy	All
(France) DAMS	9	(Belgium) Jérôme d'Ambrosio	All
(France) DAMS	10	(Japan) Kamui Kobayashi	All
(Netherlands) Trust Team Arden (Note: Arden International competed under a Dutch licence.)	11	(Switzerland) Sébastien Buemi	All
(Netherlands) Trust Team Arden	12	(Pakistan) Adam Khan	1–2
(Netherlands) Trust Team Arden	12	(Netherlands) Yelmer Buurman	3–5
(Italy) Durango	14	(Italy) Davide Valsecchi	All
(Italy) Durango	15	(Brazil) Alberto Valerio	All
(Italy) Fisichella Motor Sport International	16	(Spain) Adrián Vallés	All
(Italy) Fisichella Motor Sport International	17	(Romania) Michael Herck	1–4
(Italy) Fisichella Motor Sport International	17	(Spain) Roldán Rodríguez	5
(Italy) Trident Racing	18	(Latvia) Harald Schlegelmilch	All
(Italy) Trident Racing	19	(China) Ho-Pin Tung	All
(Brazil) Piquet Sports	20	(Italy) Marcello Puglisi	All
(Brazil) Piquet Sports	21	(Italy) Marco Bonanomi	All
(United Kingdom) DPR	22	(India) Armaan Ebrahim	All
(United Kingdom) DPR	23	(Spain) Andy Soucek	1
(United Kingdom) DPR	23	(Brazil) Diego Nunes	2–5
(Spain) BCN Competicion	24	(Serbia) Miloš Pavlović	All
(Spain) BCN Competicion	25	(Turkey) Jason Tahincioglu	All
(Malaysia) Qi-Meritus Mahara	26	(Japan) Hiroki Yoshimoto	All
(Malaysia) Qi-Meritus Mahara	27	(Italy) Luca Filippi	All

== Results ==
Round		Circuit	Date	Pole position	Fastest Lap	Winning driver	Winning team	Report
1	F	(United Arab Emirates) Dubai Autodrome (International Circuit)	25 January	(France) Romain Grosjean	(Brazil) Bruno Senna	(France) Romain Grosjean	(France) ART Grand Prix	Report
1	S	(United Arab Emirates) Dubai Autodrome (International Circuit)	26 January		(France) Romain Grosjean	(France) Romain Grosjean	(France) ART Grand Prix	Report
2	F	(Indonesia) Sentul International Circuit	16 February	(Russia) Vitaly Petrov	(Brazil) Bruno Senna	(Switzerland) Sébastien Buemi (Note: Luca Filippi was stripped of the victory after stewards found out he had used tyres allocated to his teammate Hiroki Yoshimoto.)	(Netherlands) Trust Team Arden	Report
2	S	(Indonesia) Sentul International Circuit	17 February		(Malaysia) Fairuz Fauzy	(Malaysia) Fairuz Fauzy	(United Kingdom) Super Nova Racing	Report
3	F	(Malaysia) Sepang International Circuit	22 March	(France) Romain Grosjean	(France) Romain Grosjean	(Russia) Vitaly Petrov	(Spain) Barwa International Campos Team	Report
3	S	(Malaysia) Sepang International Circuit	23 March		(Brazil) Bruno Senna	(Japan) Kamui Kobayashi	(France) DAMS	Report
4	F	Bahrain International Circuit	5 April	(France) Romain Grosjean	(France) Romain Grosjean	(France) Romain Grosjean	(France) ART Grand Prix	Report
4	S	Bahrain International Circuit	6 April		(Switzerland) Sébastien Buemi	(Japan) Kamui Kobayashi	(France) DAMS	Report
5	F	(United Arab Emirates) Dubai Autodrome (Grand Prix Circuit)	11 April	(France) Romain Grosjean	(France) Romain Grosjean	(France) Romain Grosjean	(France) ART Grand Prix	Report
5	S	(United Arab Emirates) Dubai Autodrome (Grand Prix Circuit)	12 April		(Japan) Kamui Kobayashi (Note: Kamui Kobayashi set the fastest lap, but did not finish in the top 10, so was ineligible to be the point-scorer for the fastest lap. Davide Valsecchi was the point-scorer instead for setting the fastest lap of those finishing in the top 10.)	(Italy) Marco Bonanomi	(Brazil) Piquet Sports	Report

== Championship standings ==
Scoring system

Points are awarded to the top 8 classified finishers in the Feature race, and to the top 6 classified finishers in the Sprint race. The pole-sitter in the feature race will also receive two points, and one point is given to the driver who set the fastest lap inside the top ten in both the feature and sprint races. No extra points are awarded to the pole-sitter in the sprint race.

Point system for Feature Race
Position	**1st**	**2nd**	**3rd**	**4th**	**5th**	**6th**	**7th**	**8th**	**Pole**	**FL**
Points	10	8	6	5	4	3	2	1	2	1

Point system for Sprint Race
Position	**1st**	**2nd**	**3rd**	**4th**	**5th**	**6th**	**FL**
Points	6	5	4	3	2	1	1

=== Drivers' Championship ===
Pos	Driver	DUB1 (United Arab Emirates)		SEN (Indonesia)		SEP (Malaysia)		BHR (Bahrain)		DUB2 (United Arab Emirates)		Points
1	(France) Romain Grosjean	**1**	1	4	4	**9**	2	**1**	Ret	**1**	Ret	61
2	(Switzerland) Sébastien Buemi	DSQ	Ret	1	7	Ret	Ret	2	2	2	2	37
3	(Russia) Vitaly Petrov	DNS	9	**5**	3	1	3	10	3	4	Ret	33
4	(Malaysia) Fairuz Fauzy	8	2	8	1	2	6	Ret	Ret	11	6	24
5	(Brazil) Bruno Senna	2	19	7	2	Ret	8	4	DNS	DSQ	11	23
6	(Japan) Kamui Kobayashi	13	Ret	DNS	15	5	1	3	1	20	14	22
7	(Spain) Adrián Vallés	4	Ret	2	5	Ret	20	5	Ret	Ret	10	19
8	(Italy) Davide Valsecchi	17	6	Ret	19	4	4	6	6	14	4	17
9	(Netherlands) Yelmer Buurman					6	5	9	8	3	5	13
10	(Japan) Hiroki Yoshimoto	6	4	Ret	20	Ret	10	12	4	5	13	13
11	(Belgium) Jérôme d'Ambrosio	11	8	Ret	Ret	3	Ret	11	12	7	3	12
12	(Italy) Marco Bonanomi	20	13	Ret	8	Ret	15	Ret	Ret	6	1	9
13	(India) Karun Chandhok	7	3	Ret	13	Ret	7	8	Ret	Ret	Ret	7
14	(Spain) Andy Soucek	3	7									6
15	(United Kingdom) Ben Hanley			3	16	Ret	14	Ret	10	Ret	Ret	6
16	(Serbia) Miloš Pavlović	10	14	6	Ret	7	12	19	15	8	Ret	6
17	(Italy) Luca Filippi	5	Ret	DSQ	21	Ret	Ret	Ret	11	12	Ret	4
18	(Latvia) Harald Schlegelmilch	14	18	Ret	Ret	8	Ret	14	5	16	7	3
19	(Brazil) Alberto Valerio	9	5	Ret	Ret	Ret	17	DNS	17	13	15	2
20	(Brazil) Diego Nunes	12	DNS	Ret	10	10	13	7	Ret	17	12	2
21	(China) Ho-Pin Tung	22	10	Ret	6	Ret	16	Ret	7	10	DSQ	1
22	(Turkey) Jason Tahincioglu	19	16	Ret	17	12	Ret	17	13	9	8	0
23	(Romania) Michael Herck	Ret	17	9	12	11	11	15	14			0
24	(Denmark) Christian Bakkerud	Ret	11	Ret	14	Ret	DNS	Ret	Ret	Ret	9	0
25	(United Kingdom) Stephen Jelley	15	12	DSQ	Ret	Ret	18	16	9	18	DNS	0
26	(Italy) Marcello Puglisi	16	Ret	DNS	18	13	9	18	Ret	Ret	Ret	0
27	(India) Armaan Ebrahim	21	Ret	Ret	9	Ret	19	13	16	19	Ret	0
28	(Pakistan) Adam Khan	18	15	Ret	11							0
29	(Spain) Roldán Rodríguez									15	Ret	0
Pos	Driver	DUB1 (United Arab Emirates)		SEN (Indonesia)		SEP (Malaysia)		BHR (Bahrain)		DUB2 (United Arab Emirates)		Points

Key
Colour	Result
Gold	Winner
Silver	2nd place
Bronze	3rd place
Green	Other points position
Blue	Other classified position
Blue	Not classified, finished (NC)
Purple	Not classified, retired (Ret)
Red	Did not qualify (DNQ)
Red	Did not pre-qualify (DNPQ)
Black	Disqualified (DSQ)
White	Did not start (DNS)
White	Race cancelled (C)
Blank	Did not practice (DNP)
Blank	Excluded (EX)
Blank	Did not arrive (DNA)
Blank	Withdrawn (WD)
Text formatting	Meaning
**Bold**	Pole position point(s)
Italics	Fastest lap point(s)

Notes:

- † — Drivers did not finish the race, but were classified as they completed over 90% of the race distance.

=== Teams' Championship ===
Pos	Team	Car No.	DUB1 (United Arab Emirates)		SEN (Indonesia)		SEP (Malaysia)		BHR (Bahrain)		DUB2 (United Arab Emirates)		Points
1	(France) ART Grand Prix	3	15	12	DSQ	Ret	Ret	18	16	9	18	DNS	61
1	(France) ART Grand Prix	4	**1**	1	4	4	**9**	2	**1**	Ret	**1**	Ret	61
2	(Netherlands) Trust Team Arden	11	DSQ	Ret	1	7	Ret	Ret	2	2	2	2	50
2	(Netherlands) Trust Team Arden	12	18	15	Ret	11	6	5	9	8	3	5	50
3	(Spain) Barwa International Campos Team	5	DNS	9	**5**	3	1	3	10	3	4	Ret	39
3	(Spain) Barwa International Campos Team	6	12	DNS	3	16	Ret	14	Ret	10	Ret	Ret	39
4	(France) DAMS	9	11	8	Ret	Ret	3	Ret	11	12	7	3	34
4	(France) DAMS	10	13	Ret	DNS	15	5	1	3	1	19	14	34
5	(United Kingdom) iSport International	1	7	3	Ret	13	Ret	7	8	Ret	Ret	Ret	30
5	(United Kingdom) iSport International	2	2	19	7	2	Ret	8	4	DNS	DSQ	11	30
6	(United Kingdom) Super Nova Racing	7	Ret	11	Ret	14	Ret	DNS	Ret	Ret	Ret	9	24
6	(United Kingdom) Super Nova Racing	8	8	2	8	1	2	6	Ret	Ret	11	6	24
7	(Italy) Fisichella Motor Sport International	16	4	Ret	2	5	Ret	20	5	Ret	Ret	10	19
7	(Italy) Fisichella Motor Sport International	17	Ret	17	9	12	11	11	15	14	15	Ret	19
8	(Italy) Durango	14	17	6	Ret	19	4	4	6	6	14	4	19
8	(Italy) Durango	15	9	5	Ret	Ret	Ret	17	DNS	17	13	15	19
9	(Malaysia) Qi-Meritus Mahara	26	6	4	Ret	20	Ret	10	12	4	5	13	17
9	(Malaysia) Qi-Meritus Mahara	27	5	Ret	DSQ	21	Ret	Ret	Ret	11	12	Ret	17
10	(Brazil) Piquet Sports	20	16	Ret	DNS	18	13	9	18	Ret	Ret	Ret	9
10	(Brazil) Piquet Sports	21	20	13	Ret	8	Ret	15	Ret	Ret	6	1	9
11	(United Kingdom) DPR	22	21	Ret	Ret	9	Ret	19	13	16	19	Ret	8
11	(United Kingdom) DPR	23	3	7	Ret	10	10	13	7	Ret	17	12	8
12	(Spain) BCN Competicion	24	10	14	6	Ret	7	12	19	12	8	Ret	6
12	(Spain) BCN Competicion	25	19	16	Ret	17	12	Ret	17	13	9	8	6
13	(Italy) Trident Racing	18	14	18	Ret	Ret	8	Ret	14	5	16	7	4
13	(Italy) Trident Racing	19	22	10	Ret	6	Ret	16	Ret	7	10	DSQ	4
Pos	Team	Car No.	DUB1 (United Arab Emirates)		SEN (Indonesia)		SEP (Malaysia)		BHR (Bahrain)		DUB2 (United Arab Emirates)		Points

Key
Colour	Result
Gold	Winner
Silver	2nd place
Bronze	3rd place
Green	Other points position
Blue	Other classified position
Blue	Not classified, finished (NC)
Purple	Not classified, retired (Ret)
Red	Did not qualify (DNQ)
Red	Did not pre-qualify (DNPQ)
Black	Disqualified (DSQ)
White	Did not start (DNS)
White	Race cancelled (C)
Blank	Did not practice (DNP)
Blank	Excluded (EX)
Blank	Did not arrive (DNA)
Blank	Withdrawn (WD)
Text formatting	Meaning
**Bold**	Pole position point(s)
Italics	Fastest lap point(s)

Notes:

- † — Drivers did not finish the race, but were classified as they completed over 90% of the race distance.
