= 2008 Malaysian Grand Prix =

Coordinates: 2°45′39″N 101°44′18″E

Race 2 of 18 in the 2008 Formula One World Championship
← Previous race	Next race →

Race details
- Date: 23 March 2008
- Official name: 2008 Formula 1 Petronas Malaysian Grand Prix
- Location: Sepang International Circuit; Sepang, Selangor, Malaysia
- Course: Permanent racing facility
- Course length: 5.543 km (3.444 miles)
- Distance: 56 laps, 310.408 km (192.879 miles)
- Weather: Sunny, partly cloudy
- Attendance: 126,690 (Weekend)

Pole position
Driver	(Brazil) Felipe Massa	Ferrari
- Time: 1:35.748

Fastest lap
Driver	(Germany) Nick Heidfeld	BMW Sauber
- Time: 1:35.366 on lap 55

Podium
First	(Finland) Kimi Räikkönen	Ferrari
Second	(Poland) Robert Kubica	BMW Sauber
Third	(Finland) Heikki Kovalainen	McLaren-Mercedes

The 2008 Malaysian Grand Prix (formally the 2008 Formula 1 Petronas Malaysian Grand Prix) was a Formula One motor race held on 23 March 2008 at the Sepang International Circuit, Sepang, Malaysia. It was the 2nd race of the 2008 FIA Formula One World Championship. The 56-lap race was won by Kimi Räikkönen for the Ferrari team after starting from second position. Robert Kubica finished second in a BMW Sauber car, with Heikki Kovalainen third in a McLaren.

It was an all-Ferrari front row, as Felipe Massa started from pole position, with Räikkönen alongside. The McLarens of Kovalainen and Lewis Hamilton had been expected to line up behind the Ferraris on the second row, but both drivers were given five-place grid penalties post-qualifying for holding up Nick Heidfeld and Fernando Alonso respectively, dropping them to eighth and ninth on the grid. Massa cut across his Ferrari teammate at the start, to stop him overtaking on the run to turn one. The top four of Massa, Räikkönen, Kubica and Mark Webber held station until the first round of pit stops. Räikkönen took the lead after these stops and after Massa retired following a spin into the gravel, the Finn cruised to a victory of nearly twenty seconds. Championship leader Hamilton could only finish in fifth position, after a tardy first stop on lap 19, with his McLaren team encountering a problem on his front right tyre and lost ground while trying to pass Webber.

== Report ==
=== Background ===
The Grand Prix was contested by 22 drivers, in 11 teams of two. The teams, also known as "constructors", were Ferrari, McLaren-Mercedes, Renault, Honda, Force India, BMW Sauber, Toyota, Red Bull Racing, Williams, Toro Rosso and Super Aguri.

Prior to the race, McLaren driver Lewis Hamilton led the Drivers' Championship with 10 points, and BMW Sauber driver Nick Heidfeld was second with 8 points. Behind them in the Drivers' Championship, Nico Rosberg was third with 6 points in a Williams, and Fernando Alonso was fourth with 5 points in a Renault. Hamilton's teammate Heikki Kovalainen was fifth with 4 points. In the Constructors' Championship, McLaren–Mercedes were leading with 14 points, five points ahead of Williams, and BMW Sauber were third with 8 points.

=== Practice and qualifying ===
"This morning I lost time because of a communication problem within the team, but we made up for it in the second session. The car seems to be going well and I am pleased with the work we have done. I worked mainly on the harder tyres, but I think that even with the softs, from what we have seen, we can be competitive. It is always difficult to say where we are compared to our rivals, but I think we can face the rest of the weekend with confidence."

— Kimi Räikkönen, reflecting on his mishap in the first Friday session, and recovering to third in the second session.

Three practice sessions were held before the race; the first was held on Friday morning and the second on Friday afternoon. Both sessions lasted 1 hour and 30 minutes with weather conditions dry throughout. The third session was held on Saturday morning and lasted an hour.

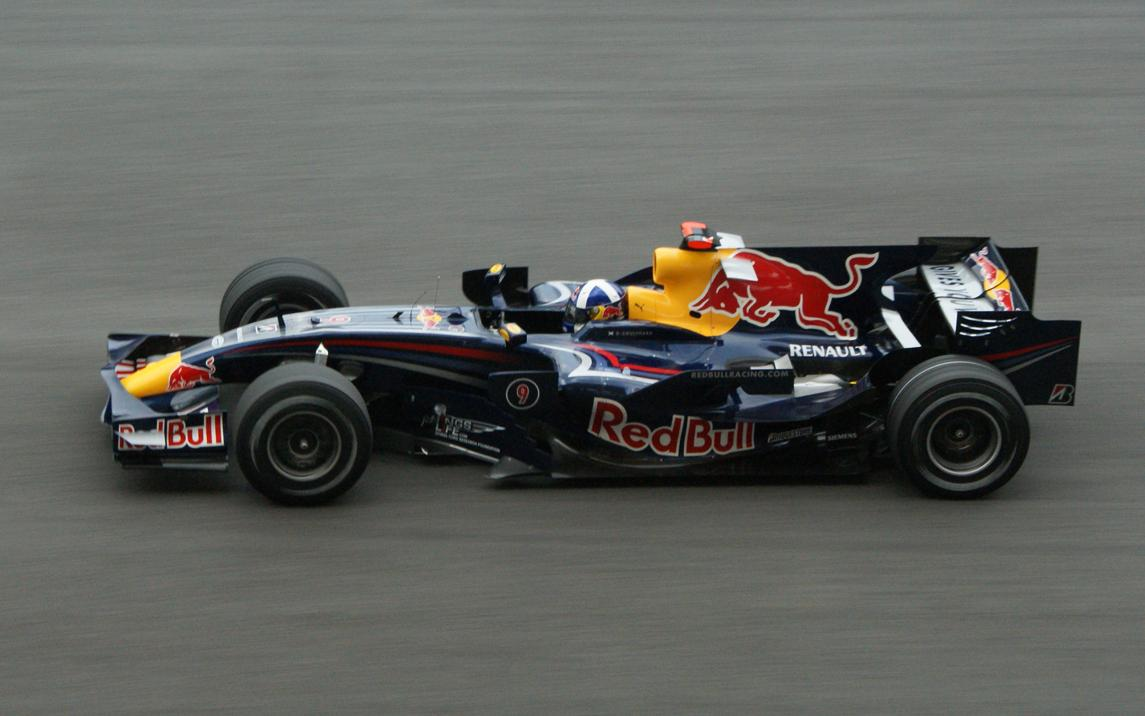
David Coulthard's Red Bull RB4 suffered a worrying suspension breakage during practice; the team were allowed to compete after proving to the FIA that the cars were safe.

In the first session, Massa was fastest on a lap of 1:35.392, which was over a second faster than any of his rivals. Räikkönen ended up second, despite running out of fuel during the session, and Kovalainen ended up third, just under a tenth of a second slower than his fellow Finn. Also during the session, the Red Bull Racing machine of David Coulthard suffered a track rod failure on the curb of turn 12, and forced the team to show the FIA clarification that their car design was safe for the Grand Prix, under Article 2.3 of the 2008 Formula One Technical Regulations. Coulthard sat out the second practice session, which saw Hamilton top the timesheets with a lap of 1:35.055, beating Massa by 0.151 seconds, with Räikkönen a further two tenths back in third. In preparation for the qualifying session, many teams put their cars on soft tyres for the third practice session. The soft tyre gives better performance than the harder type of tyre but is less durable than the harder compound. Just like in Australia, the BMW of Heidfeld was fastest, setting a lap of 1:35.019, edging out the Ferraris of Räikkönen and Massa with Jarno Trulli's Toyota fourth, ending up just one-thousandth of a second behind Massa's time.

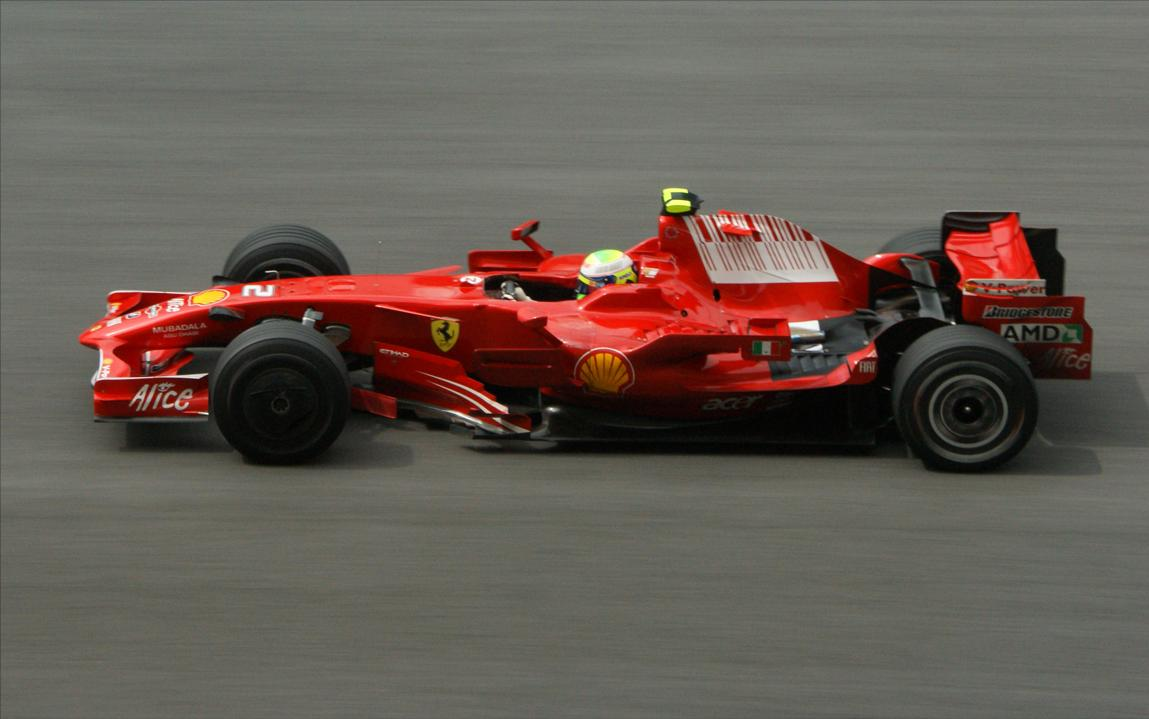
Felipe Massa, who took pole position in his Ferrari F2008.

"The first corners of my last lap went smoothly, but then there were several cars driving very slowly on their in-laps. Apparently they had no information that the qualifying was still going on. Before Turn Four I lost a lot of time because both McLarens were cruising on the racing line. I think this has cost me about two tenths of a second, which would have meant being third instead of seventh. I just couldn't drive on the line I wanted and, even more importantly, could not brake were I wanted."

— Nick Heidfeld, on the McLaren drivers' antics.

In qualifying, Massa earned his tenth career pole position, after recording a lap of 1:35.748 during the third and final session. He was joined on the front row by teammate Räikkönen, although the Finn's fastest time was more than half a second slower than that of Massa. Third and fourth had originally gone to the McLarens of Kovalainen and Hamilton, however post-qualifying, both drivers were demoted five places on the grid for dangerous driving; having completed their flying laps, the McLaren pair and other drivers slowed to conserve fuel on their in-laps, and impeded Nick Heidfeld of BMW Sauber and Fernando Alonso of Renault whilst they were both on flying laps. This led to a new rule being introduced for Bahrain giving drivers a set time to complete in-laps in. McLaren's misfortune was to the gain of the Toyota of Trulli, both victims of the impeding (Heidfeld and Alonso), Heidfeld's teammate Kubica and Webber's Red Bull machine. Timo Glock rounded out the top ten in his Toyota.

=== Race ===
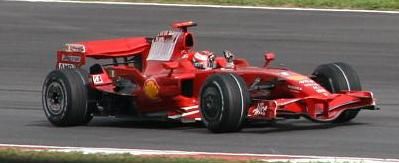
Kimi Räikkönen won the race by nearly twenty seconds, ahead of Robert Kubica.

At the start Massa came across the track to prevent Räikkönen from overtaking him. Further back, Hamilton was able to move up to fifth and Webber up to fourth. Also on the first lap, Sébastien Bourdais spun out of the race. A crash between the Williams of Nico Rosberg and Glock's Toyota happened a few corners later, in which Rosberg destroyed the front wing of his Williams FW30 and forced Glock to retire from the race. On lap four, Alonso and Heidfeld overtook the Red Bull of David Coulthard for ninth and eighth respectively. Adrian Sutil was forced to retire two laps later when he ran off the track and onto the grass, with hydraulic problems.

By lap nine Hamilton was within two seconds of Webber and the Ferraris of Massa and Räikkönen had opened up a lead on the rest of the field. Both set new fastest lap times over the next four laps. Webber pitted on lap 16, Massa on lap 17 and Räikkönen on lap 18, coming out ahead of Massa. Hamilton pitted on lap 19 and the team had a problem getting his front right tyre off, forcing him to stop for almost twenty seconds, and in the process he lost around twelve seconds to the Ferraris, meaning he came out behind Webber in 11th.

Räikkönen took the lead for the first time when Kubica pitted on lap 21. He would open up a lead of almost four seconds in the next six laps. Hamilton was up to seventh by lap 26 but was still unable to overtake Webber. Hamilton was within half a second of him by lap 29 but this forced him to brake harder and lose time to the rest of the field. Massa spun out of the race on lap 31 getting trapped in the gravel. This gave Räikkönen a lead of over 20 seconds from the next driver Kubica. Hamilton finally overtook Webber on lap 40 when he pitted. Vettel's engine failed one lap later and he was forced to retire. Hamilton would stay ahead of Webber after his second pit stop on lap 44. He was now six seconds behind Trulli in fourth and began to close that margin in the closing laps.

Alonso in eighth now began closing in on Webber. Hamilton was within two seconds of Trulli with two laps to go but was unable to pass him before the end of the race. Räikkönen won the race by nearly twenty seconds from Kubica who had his best ever finish in second; Kovalainen came third. Nick Heidfeld and BMW Sauber earned their first fastest lap, giving Heidfeld a record in "most races before first fastest lap" with 134, surpassing the former record of 114 held by Thierry Boutsen.

== Classification ==
=== Qualifying ===
Pos	No	Driver	Constructor	Part 1	Part 2	Part 3	Grid
1	2	(Brazil) Felipe Massa	Ferrari	1:35.347	1:34.412	1:35.748	1
2	1	(Finland) Kimi Räikkönen	Ferrari	1:35.645	1:34.188	1:36.230	2
3	23	(Finland) Heikki Kovalainen	McLaren-Mercedes	1:35.227	1:34.759	1:36.613	8^{1}
4	22	(United Kingdom) Lewis Hamilton	McLaren-Mercedes	1:35.392	1:34.627	1:36.709	9^{2}
5	11	(Italy) Jarno Trulli	Toyota	1:35.205	1:34.960	1:36.711	3
6	4	(Poland) Robert Kubica	BMW Sauber	1:35.794	1:34.811	1:36.727	4
7	3	(Germany) Nick Heidfeld	BMW Sauber	1:35.729	1:34.648	1:36.753	5
8	10	(Australia) Mark Webber	Red Bull-Renault	1:35.440	1:34.967	1:37.009	6
9	5	(Spain) Fernando Alonso	Renault	1:35.983	1:35.140	1:38.450	7
10	12	(Germany) Timo Glock	Toyota	1:35.891	1:35.000	1:39.656	10
11	16	(United Kingdom) Jenson Button	Honda	1:35.847	1:35.208		11
12	9	(United Kingdom) David Coulthard	Red Bull-Renault	1:36.058	1:35.408		12
13	6	(Brazil) Nelson Piquet Jr.	Renault	1:36.074	1:35.562		13
14	17	(Brazil) Rubens Barrichello	Honda	1:36.198	1:35.622		14
15	15	(Germany) Sebastian Vettel	Toro Rosso-Ferrari	1:36.111	1:35.648		15
16	7	(Germany) Nico Rosberg	Williams-Toyota	1:35.843	1:35.670		16
17	21	(Italy) Giancarlo Fisichella	Force India-Ferrari	1:36.240			17
18	8	(Japan) Kazuki Nakajima	Williams-Toyota	1:36.388			22^{3}
19	14	(France) Sébastien Bourdais	Toro Rosso-Ferrari	1:36.677			18
20	18	(Japan) Takuma Sato	Super Aguri-Honda	1:37.087			19
21	20	(Germany) Adrian Sutil	Force India-Ferrari	1:37.101			20
22	19	(United Kingdom) Anthony Davidson	Super Aguri-Honda	1:37.481			21

Notes

- ^1 – Heikki Kovalainen received a five-place grid penalty for obstructing Fernando Alonso in Q3.
- ^2 – Lewis Hamilton received a five-place grid penalty for obstructing Nick Heidfeld in Q3.
- ^3 – Kazuki Nakajima incurred a ten-place grid penalty for colliding with Robert Kubica in the Australian Grand Prix.

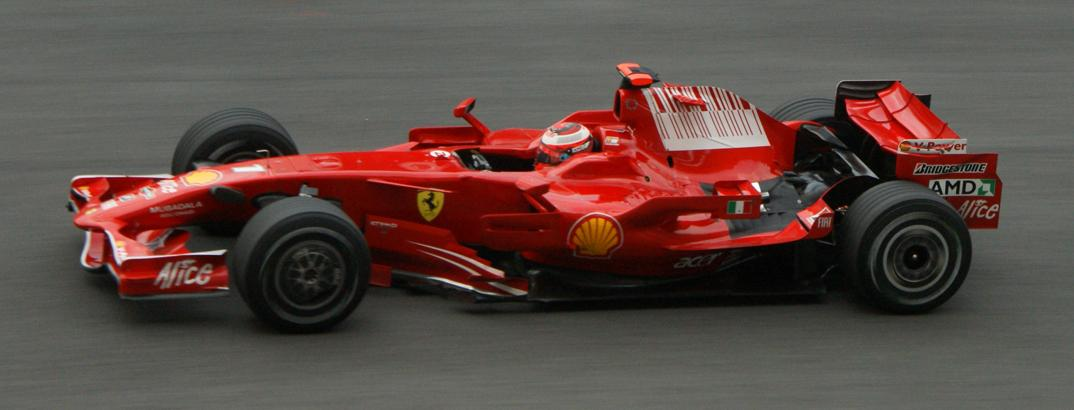
Kimi Räikkönen took his and Ferrari's first win of the year.

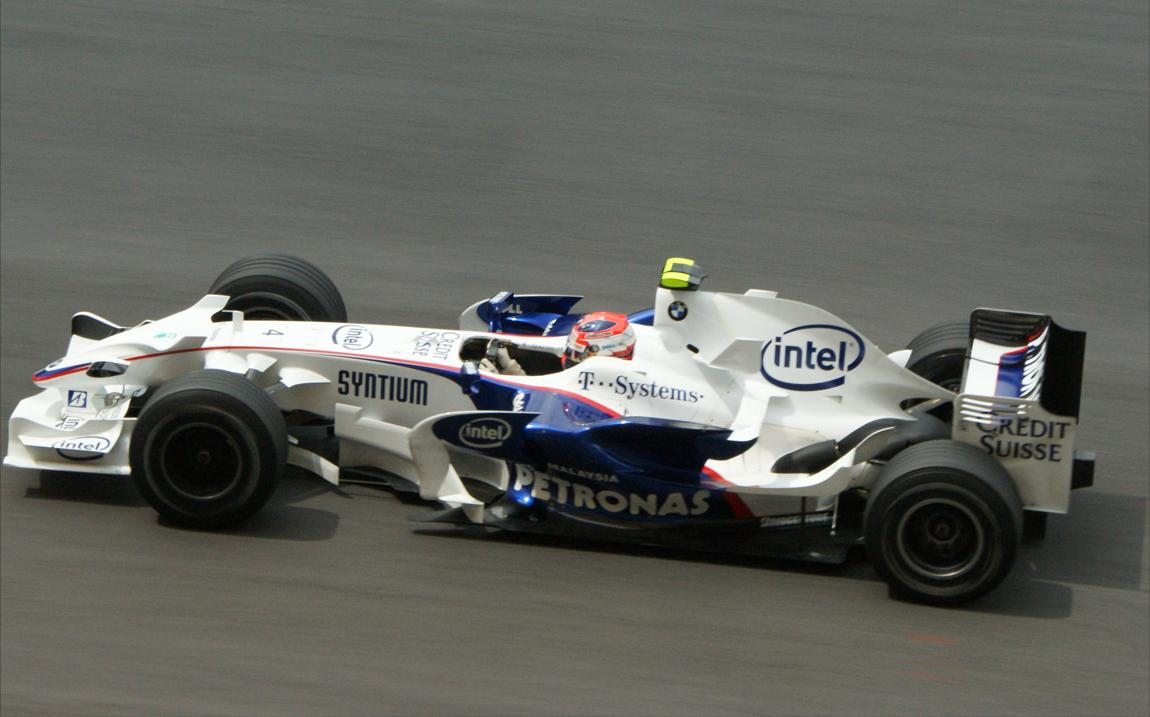
Robert Kubica finished second for BMW Sauber.

=== Race ===
Pos	No	Driver	Constructor	Laps	Time/Retired	Grid	Points
1	1	(Finland) Kimi Räikkönen	Ferrari	56	1:31:18.555	2	10
2	4	(Poland) Robert Kubica	BMW Sauber	56	+19.570	4	8
3	23	(Finland) Heikki Kovalainen	McLaren-Mercedes	56	+38.450	8	6
4	11	(Italy) Jarno Trulli	Toyota	56	+45.832	3	5
5	22	(United Kingdom) Lewis Hamilton	McLaren-Mercedes	56	+46.548	9	4
6	3	(Germany) Nick Heidfeld	BMW Sauber	56	+49.833	5	3
7	10	(Australia) Mark Webber	Red Bull-Renault	56	+1:08.130	6	2
8	5	(Spain) Fernando Alonso	Renault	56	+1:10.041	7	1
9	9	(United Kingdom) David Coulthard	Red Bull-Renault	56	+1:16.220	12	
10	16	(United Kingdom) Jenson Button	Honda	56	+1:26.214	11	
11	6	(Brazil) Nelson Piquet Jr.	Renault	56	+1:32.202	13	
12	21	(Italy) Giancarlo Fisichella	Force India-Ferrari	55	+1 Lap	17	
13	17	(Brazil) Rubens Barrichello	Honda	55	+1 Lap	14	
14	7	(Germany) Nico Rosberg	Williams-Toyota	55	+1 Lap	16	
15	19	(United Kingdom) Anthony Davidson	Super Aguri-Honda	55	+1 Lap	21	
16	18	(Japan) Takuma Sato	Super Aguri-Honda	54	+2 Laps	19	
17	8	(Japan) Kazuki Nakajima	Williams-Toyota	54	+2 Laps	22	
Ret	15	(Germany) Sebastian Vettel	Toro Rosso-Ferrari	39	Hydraulics	15	
Ret	2	(Brazil) Felipe Massa	Ferrari	30	Spun off	1	
Ret	20	(Germany) Adrian Sutil	Force India-Ferrari	5	Hydraulics	20	
Ret	12	(Germany) Timo Glock	Toyota	1	Collision	10	
Ret	14	(France) Sébastien Bourdais	Toro Rosso-Ferrari	0	Spun off	18	

== Championship standings after the race ==
Despite his fifth position, Hamilton kept the Drivers' Championship lead with 14 points, closely followed by Räikkönen and Heidfeld on 11. In the Constructors' Championship, McLaren also kept their lead, with their five-point lead from Australia staying intact. BMW Sauber moved into second place on 19, with Ferrari in third on 11.

Drivers' Championship standings

	Pos.	Driver	Points
	1	(United Kingdom) Lewis Hamilton	14
6	2	(Finland) Kimi Räikkönen	11
1	3	(Germany) Nick Heidfeld	11
1	4	(Finland) Heikki Kovalainen	10
4	5	(Poland) Robert Kubica	8

Constructors' Championship standings

	Pos.	Constructor	Points
	1	(United Kingdom) McLaren-Mercedes	24
1	2	(Germany) BMW Sauber	19
3	3	(Italy) Ferrari	11
2	4	(United Kingdom) Williams-Toyota	9
1	5	(France) Renault	6

- Note: Only the top five positions are included for both sets of standings.

== See also ==
- 2008 Malaysian GP2 Asia Series round
- 2008 Malaysian Speedcar Series round

Previous race: 2008 Australian Grand Prix	FIA Formula One World Championship; 2008 season	Next race: 2008 Bahrain Grand Prix
Previous race: 2007 Malaysian Grand Prix	Malaysian Grand Prix	Next race: 2009 Malaysian Grand Prix
