= Christian Bakkerud =

Danish racing driver (1984–2011)

- Nationality: (Denmark) Danish
- Born: 3 November 1984 Copenhagen
- Died: 11 September 2011 (aged 26) Tooting, London
- Years active: 2002–2010

Previous series
- 2009 2008 2007–08 2005–06 2004 2002–03: Deutsche Tourenwagen Masters; GP2 Asia Series; GP2 Series; British F3 Championship; Formula BMW UK; Formula BMW ADAC

24 Hours of Le Mans career
- Years: 2009 – 2010
- Teams: Kolles
- Best finish: 9th (2009)
- Class wins: 0

Christian Bakkerud (3 November 1984 – 11 September 2011) was a Danish racing driver, who competed in the 2007 and 2008 GP2 Series seasons, albeit hindered by a recurrent back injury. Prior to GP2 he competed in British Formula 3 and Formula BMW.

Bakkerud was not related to rallycross driver Andreas Bakkerud.

== Career ==
=== Formula BMW ===
Bakkerud competed in Formula BMW from 2002 to 2004, joining the British version of the series in the latter year after two seasons in Germany.

=== Formula Three ===
Bakkerud competed in British Formula 3 in 2005 and 2006. Having finished seventh in the championship in 2005, he improved to sixth place in 2006, and also scored his first series win for Carlin at Mugello in 2006 - arguably his career highlight. During this time, he also competed in the Macau Grand Prix and the Ultimate Masters of Formula Three race.

=== GP2 Series ===
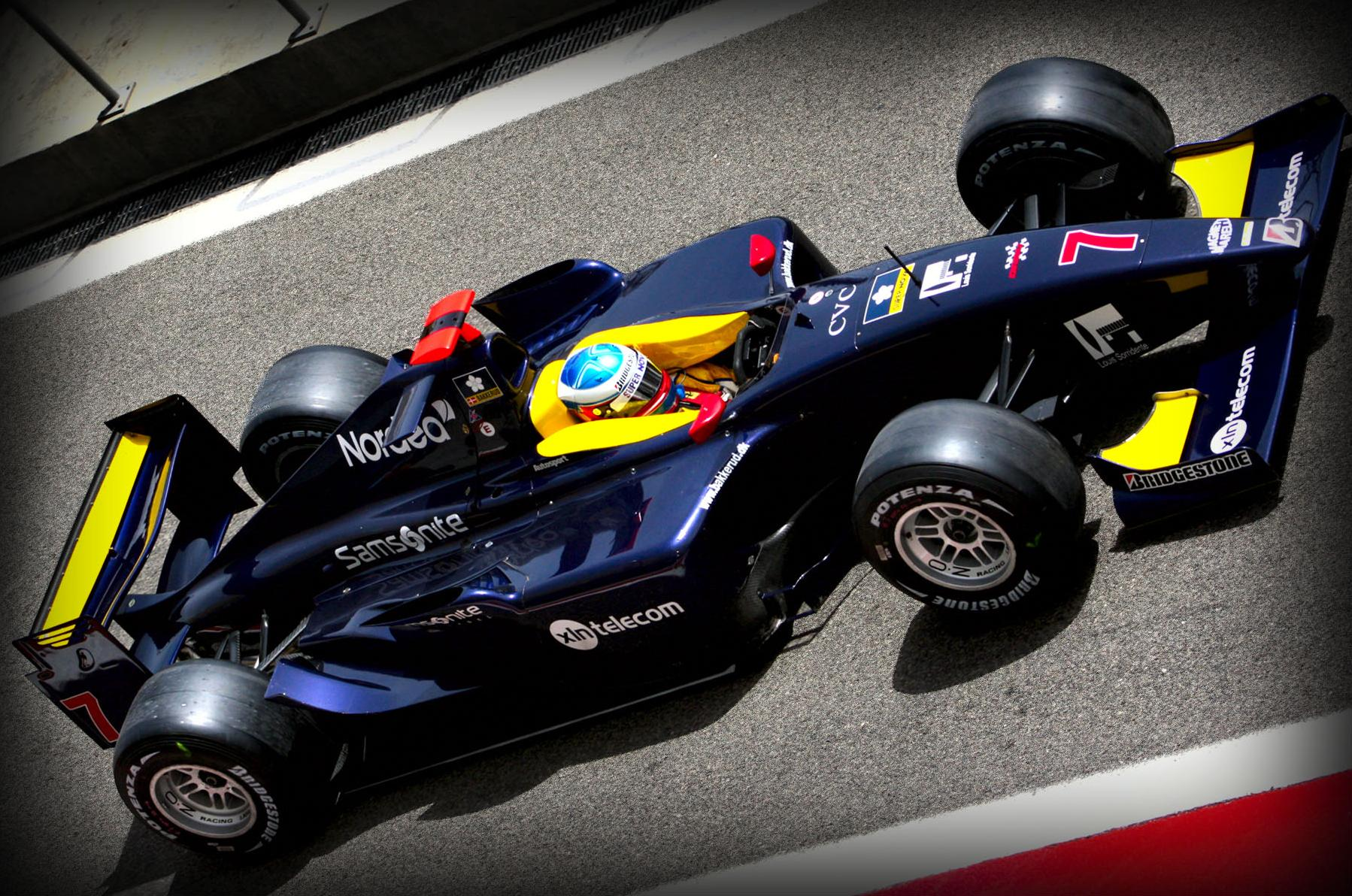
Bakkerud driving for Super Nova in the 2008 GP2 Asia Series season.

Bakkerud took part in the 2007 GP2 Series season for the DPR team, paired with Spaniard Andy Soucek. The season was disappointing, as Bakkerud failed to score any points. He also suffered back injuries, trapping nerves whilst racing on two separate occasions.

Bakkerud moved to the Super Nova team for the 2008 GP2 Asia Series, reinforcing his unlucky reputation by retiring from all but three of the races. He remained for the 2008 GP2 Series proper, he suffered a recurrence of his back injury after a collision with Ben Hanley in the first race. He was replaced by Soucek whilst he recovered, and made his return to the cockpit at Monaco, after missing the championship round at Istanbul. He crashed at the start of the sprint race at Monaco, briefly going airborne after hitting Kamui Kobayashi. He did not suffer a recurrence of his back injury despite a heavy landing. However, the injury flared up once more following a testing session, and he withdrew from the rest of the season on medical grounds. He was replaced by Soucek.

=== DTM ===
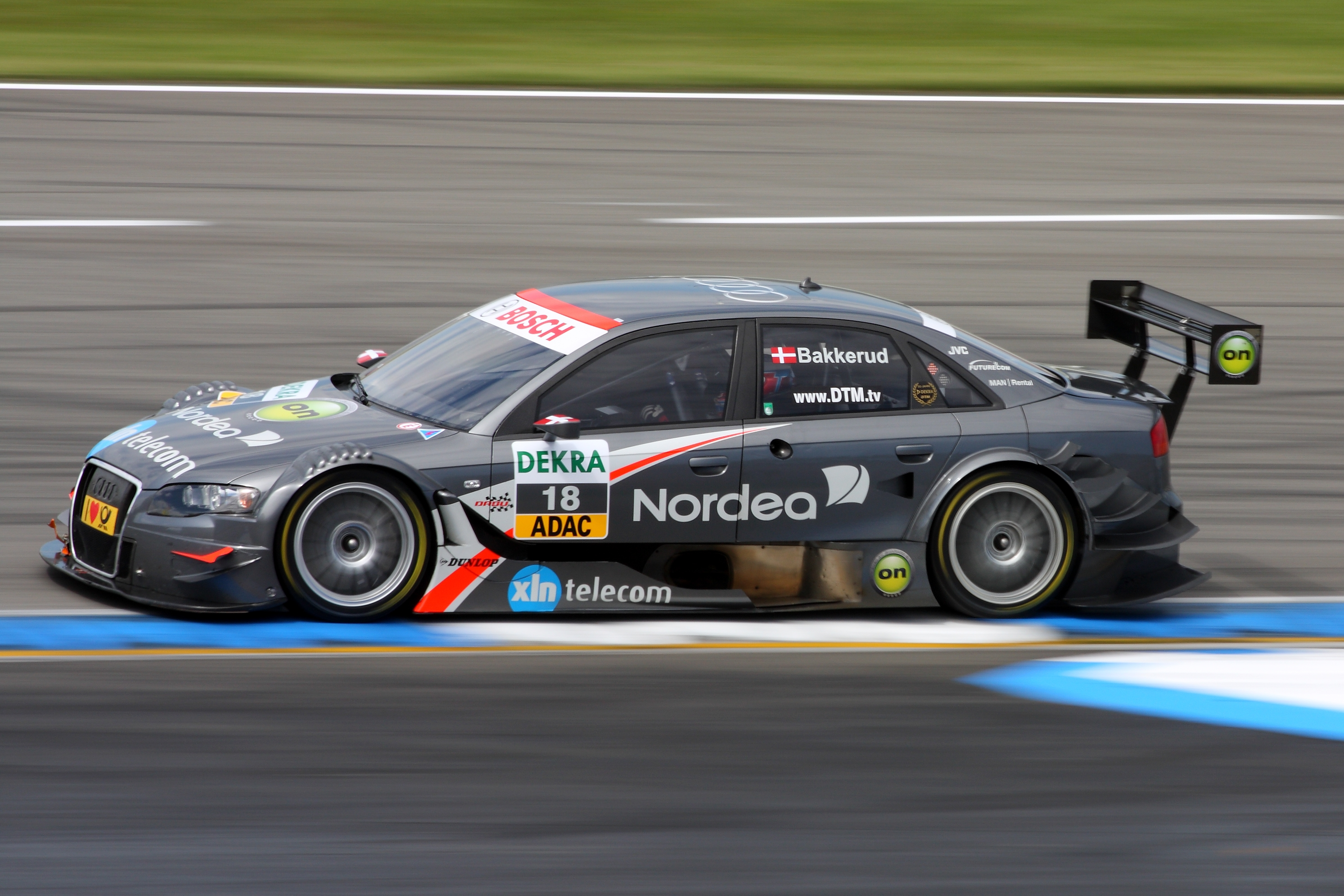
Christian Bakkerud on the Hockenheimring 2009

In 2009, Bakkerud raced in the Deutsche Tourenwagen Masters in a two-year-old Audi A4 for Futurecom-TME.

=== Le Mans ===
Bakkerud also made his Le Mans début in 2009, driving an Audi R10 TDI privately entered by Colin Kolles's team. Paired with Christijan Albers and Giorgio Mondini, he finished ninth overall and in class. He returned to the event in 2010 with the same team and car, but on this occasion he, Albers and Oliver Jarvis failed to finish.

=== Retirement ===
Bakkerud retired from driving following the 2010 Le Mans race. In the year prior to his death, he worked as an import manager at a shipping company.

== Death ==
On 10 September 2011, Bakkerud was involved in a car crash at the Tibbet's Corner roundabout at Putney Heath, near Wimbledon Common. He died a day later, in St George's Hospital, from his injuries. He was driving an Audi RS6 at the time of the accident; a police investigation followed. Travelling south on the A219 on Tibbet's Ride from Putney Hill, the car appeared to fail to negotiate a left turn into the large roundabout itself and instead travelled onwards and hit a thick, 1.5-metre (4.9 ft) high concrete barrier on the inside of the dual lane roundabout. The car then flipped over the barrier, fell down a steep 3-metre (9.8 ft) grass incline before smashing through the steel fence separating the bridleway and pedestrian/cyclist underpass routes. Crash investigators used yellow spray paint to mark skid and impact points on the road and where the car flipped over the barrier. The straight skid marks showed his car crossed from nearside to inside lane, as the road veered left at the roundabout entry, before it made a glancing blow on a heavy steel crash barrier prior to the barrier impact some six metres later.

Within a week, a large number of flower bouquets were left at the location where the car came to rest. Police had also erected a yellow sign appealing for witnesses, which stated the accident occurred at about 6am on 10 September.

Formula One team HRT, led by Colin Kolles, added a tribute to Bakkerud to the livery of their cars during the 2011 Singapore Grand Prix weekend. McLaren driver Lewis Hamilton also paid tribute to Bakkerud by wearing a helmet featuring his initials.

== Racing record ==
=== Complete Formula BMW ADAC results ===
(key) (Races in bold indicate pole position) (Races in italics indicate fastest lap)

Year	Entrant	1	2	3	4	5	6	7	8	9	10	11	12	13	14	15	16	17	18	19	20	DC	Points
2002	VIVA Racing	HOC1; 1; 6	HOC1; 2; 3	ZOL; 1; 11	ZOL; 2; 12	SAC; 1; 14	SAC; 2; 6	NÜR1; 1; 9	NÜR1; 2; 8	NOR; 1; 13	NOR; 2; 17	LAU; 1; 5	LAU; 2 DNS	NÜR2; 1; 19	NÜR2; 2; 15	A1R; 1 Ret	A1R; 2; 18	ZAN; 1; 17	ZAN; 2 Ret	HOC2; 1; 14	HOC2; 2; 16	15th	37
2003	Team Rosberg	HOC1; 1; 26	HOC1; 2; 19	ADR; 1; 16	ADR; 2; 18	NÜR1; 1; 16	NÜR1; 2; 18	LAU; 1; 9	LAU; 2; 12	NOR; 1; 11	NOR; 2; 8	NÜR2; 1; 11	NÜR2; 2 Ret	NÜR3; 1; 17	NÜR3; 2 Ret	A1R; 1	A1R; 2	ZAN; 1	ZAN; 2	HOC2; 1 Ret	HOC2; 2; 15	24th	5

=== Complete Formula BMW UK results ===
(key) (Races in bold indicate pole position) (Races in italics indicate fastest lap)

Year	Entrant	1	2	3	4	5	6	7	8	9	10	11	12	13	14	15	16	17	18	19	20	DC	Points
2004	Carlin Motorsport	THR; 1 Ret	THR; 2; 2	BRH; 1; 8	BRH; 2; 7	SIL; 1; 9	SIL; 2; 3	OUL; 1; 5	OUL; 2 Ret	MON; 1; 9	MON; 2 Ret	CRO; 1; 8	CRO; 2 Ret	KNO; 1; 15	KNO; 2; 16	BRH; 1; 14	BRH; 2; 12	ROC; 1 Ret	ROC; 2; 3	DON; 1 Ret	DON; 2 Ret	11th	61

=== Complete British Formula Three Championship results ===
(key) (Races in bold indicate pole position) (Races in italics indicate fastest lap)

Year	Entrant	Chassis	Engine	Class	1	2	3	4	5	6	7	8	9	10	11	12	13	14	15	16	17	18	19	20	21	22	23	24	DC	Points
2005	Carlin Motorsport	Dallara F305	Mugen-Honda	Championship	DON; 1; 5	DON; 2; 6	SPA; 1 C	SPA; 2 C	CRO; 1; 4	CRO; 2; 2	KNO; 1; 6	KNO; 2; 7	THR; 1; 3	THR; 2; 3	CAS; 1; 8	CAS; 2; 6	MNZ; 1; 5	MNZ; 2; 12	MNZ; 3; 3	SIL; 1; 16	SIL; 2; 7	SIL; 3; 9	NÜR; 1; 8	NÜR; 2; 13	MON; 1; 7	MON; 2 Ret	SIL; 1; 6	SIL; 2 Ret	7th	124
2006	Carlin Motorsport	Dallara F306	Mugen-Honda	Championship	OUL; 1; 7	OUL; 2; 2	DON; 1; 9	DON; 2 Ret	PAU; 1 Ret	PAU; 2; 12	MON; 1; 11	MON; 2; 4	SNE; 1 Ret	SNE; 2; 7	SPA; 1; 7	SPA; 2 Ret	SIL; 1; 12	SIL; 2; 2	BRH; 1; 10	BRH; 2; 9	MUG; 1; 1	MUG; 2; 6	SIL; 1; 3	SIL; 2; 7	THR; 1; 5	THR; 2; 2			6th	129

=== Complete GP2 Series results ===
(key) (Races in bold indicate pole position) (Races in italics indicate fastest lap)

Year	Entrant	1	2	3	4	5	6	7	8	9	10	11	12	13	14	15	16	17	18	19	20	21	DC	Points
2007	DPR	BHR; FEA; 13	BHR; SPR; Ret	CAT; FEA; 12	CAT; SPR; Ret	MON; FEA; Ret	MAG; FEA; Ret	MAG; SPR; 12	SIL; FEA; Ret	SIL; SPR; 21	NÜR; FEA; Ret	NÜR; SPR; 18	HUN; FEA; Ret	HUN; SPR; DNS	IST; FEA; DNQ	IST; SPR; DNQ	MNZ; FEA	MNZ; SPR	SPA; FEA; 12	SPA; SPR; Ret	VAL; FEA; Ret	VAL; SPR; Ret	32nd	0
2008	Super Nova Racing	CAT; FEA; Ret	CAT; SPR; DNS	IST; FEA	IST; SPR	MON; FEA; 10	MON; SPR; Ret	MAG; FEA	MAG; SPR	SIL; FEA	SIL; SPR	HOC; FEA	HOC; SPR	HUN; FEA	HUN; SPR	VAL; FEA	VAL; SPR	SPA; FEA	SPA; SPR	MNZ; FEA	MNZ; SPR		27th	0

==== Complete GP2 Asia Series results ====
(key) (Races in bold indicate pole position) (Races in italics indicate fastest lap)

Year	Entrant	1	2	3	4	5	6	7	8	9	10	DC	Points
2008	Super Nova Racing	DUB1; FEA; Ret	DUB1; SPR; 11	SEN; FEA; Ret	SEN; SPR; 14	SEP; FEA; Ret	SEP; SPR; DNS	BHR; FEA; Ret	BHR; SPR; Ret	DUB2; FEA; Ret	DUB2; SPR; 9	27th	0

=== Complete DTM results ===
(key) (Races in bold indicate pole position) (Races in italics indicate fastest lap)

Year	Team	1	2	3	4	5	6	7	8	9	10	Pos	Points
2009	Kolles Futurecom	HOC; 14	LAU; 14	NOR; 15	LAU; DSQ	OSC	NÜR; 13	BRH; 16	CAT; 17	DIJ; Ret	HOC; 12	19th	0

=== 24 Hours of Le Mans results ===
Year	Team	Co-Drivers	Car	Class	Laps	Pos.	Class Pos.
2009	(Germany) Kolles	(Netherlands) Christijan Albers (Switzerland) Giorgio Mondini	Audi R10 TDI	LMP1	360	9th	9th
2010	(Germany) Kolles	(United Kingdom) Oliver Jarvis (Netherlands) Christijan Albers	Audi R10 TDI	LMP1	331	DNF	DNF
