= David Terrien =

French racing driver (born 1976)

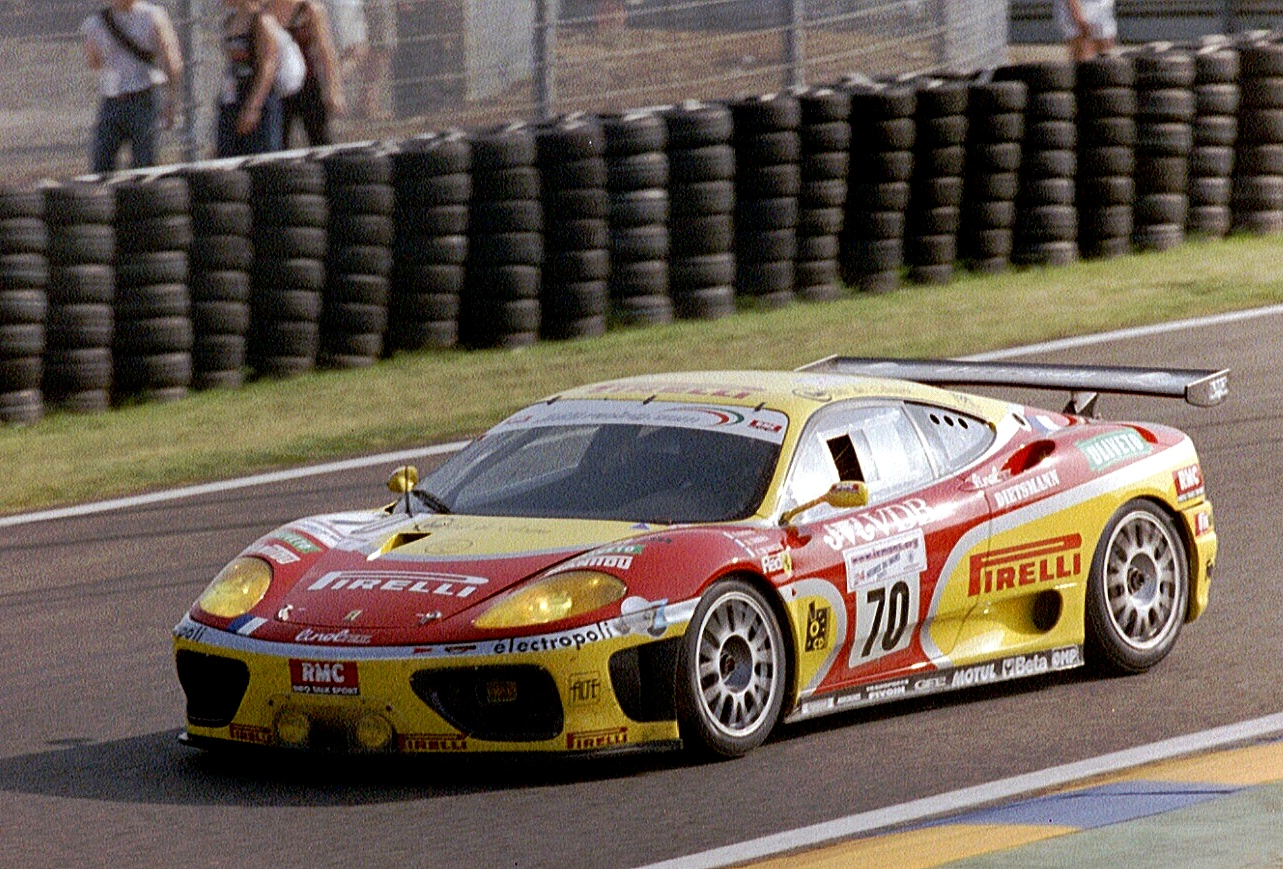
- Terrien's JMB Ferrari in 2003.
- Nationality: (France) French
- Born: 27 October 1976 (age 50) Nantes (France)

Championship titles
- 2002 2001 2000 1996 1993: Spa 24 Hours; FIA N-GT Championship; SportsRacing World Cup; Formula Ford 1800 France; CIK-FIA Karting World Championship

Awards
- 1999: Jean Rondeau Prize

David Terrien (born 27 October 1976 in Nantes) is a French racing driver. A karting world champion in his youth, he progressed to single-seaters and competed in International Formula 3000 in 1999. He was most successful in endurance racing, winning the 1999 Jean Rondeau Prize, the 2000 SportsRacing World Cup, the 2001 FIA N-GT Championship and the 2002 Spa 24 Hours.

Terrien moved to Dubai in the mid-2000s and has been described as a "key figure" in developing karting in the Middle East.

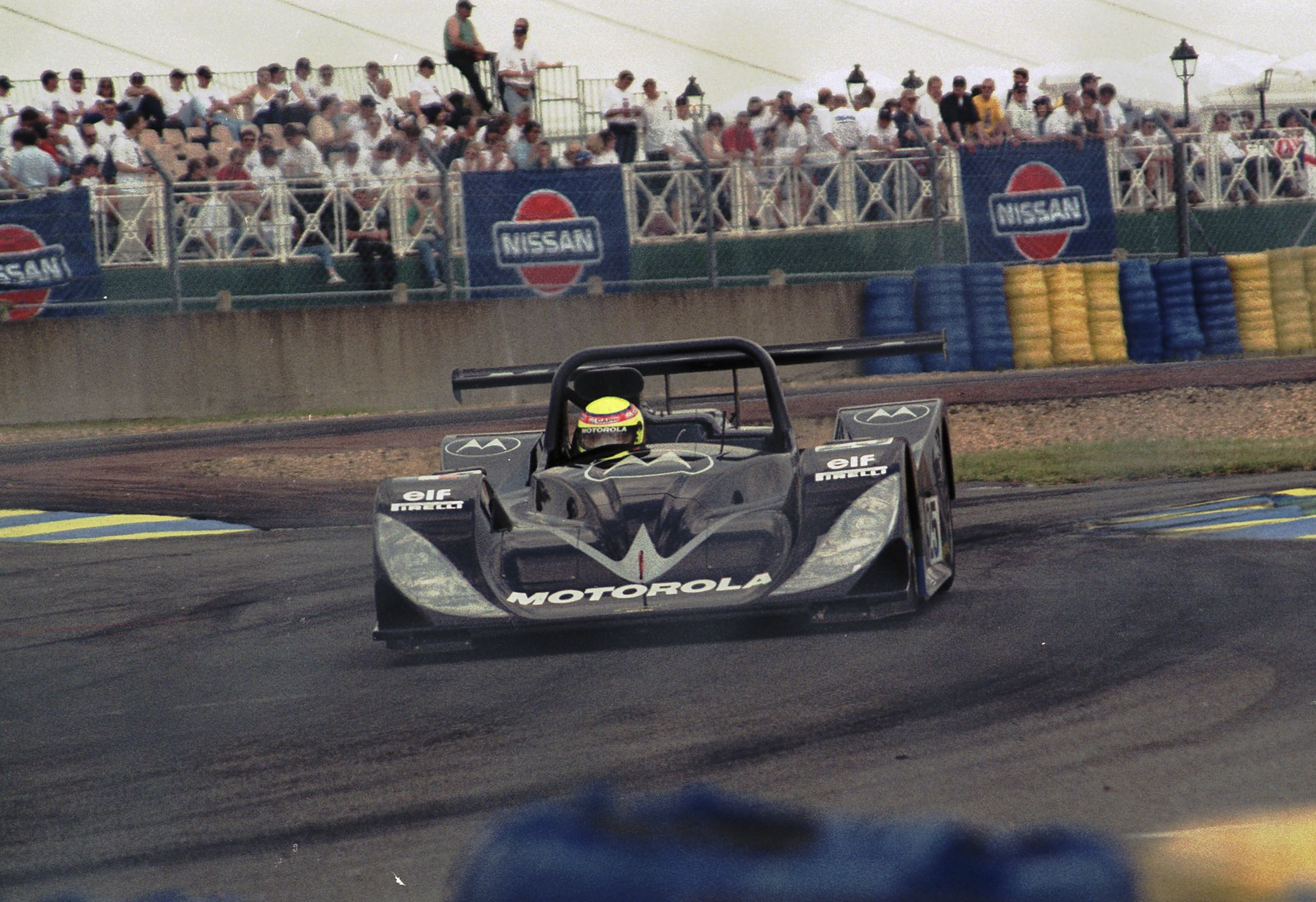
Terrien was awarded the Jean Rondeau Prize for his performance at his Le Mans debut in 1999.

== Racing record ==
=== Complete International Formula 3000 results ===
(key)

Year	Entrant	1	2	3	4	5	6	7	8	9	10	DC	Points
1999	DAMS	IMO; DNQ	MON; 8	CAT; Ret	MAG; 9	SIL; 11	A1R; DNQ	HOC; DNQ	HUN; DNQ	SPA; 8	NÜR; 11	NC	0

=== 24 Hours of Le Mans results ===
Year	Team	Co-Drivers	Car	Class	Laps	Pos.	Class Pos.
1999	(France) DAMS	(France) Franck Montagny (France) Christophe Tinseau	Lola B98/10-Judd	LMP	77	DNF	DNF
2000	(France) ROC	(Switzerland) Jean-Denis Délétraz (Germany) Ralf Kelleners	Reynard 2KQ-LM-Volkswagen	LMP675	44	DNF	DNF
2001	Équipe de France FFSA	(France) Jonathan Cochet (France) Jean-Philippe Dayraut	Chrysler Viper GTS-R	LMGTS	4	DNF	DNF
2003	(France) JMB Racing	(Italy) Fabio Babini (Italy) Fabrizio De Simone	Ferrari 360 Modena GT	LMGT	273	25th	7th

=== 24 Hours of Spa results ===
Year	Team	Co-Drivers	Car	Class	Laps	Pos.	Class Pos.
1998	(Belgium) Peugeot Belgique	(France) Steeve Hiesse (France) Sébastien Philippe	Peugeot 306 GTi 16	N2.0	460	10th	**1st**
2001	(France) JMB Competition	(Italy) Andrea Garbagnati (Italy) Christian Pescatori	Ferrari 360 Modena N-GT	N-GT	401	DNF	DNF
2002	(France) Larbre Compétition Chéreau	(France) Christophe Bouchut (France) Sébastien Bourdais (Belgium) Vincent Vosse	Chrysler Viper GTS-R	GT	526	**1st**	**1st**
2003	(France) JMB Racing	(Italy) Andrea Bertolini (Italy) Christian Pescatori	Ferrari 360 Modena GT	N-GT	96	DNF	DNF

=== Complete FIA GT Championship results ===
(key) (Races in bold indicate pole position) (Races in italics indicate fastest lap)

Year	Team	Car	Class	1	2	3	4	5	6	7	8	9	10	11	Pos.	Pts
2001	JMB Competition	Ferrari 360 Modena N-GT	N-GT	MNZ; Ret	BRN; 2	MAG; 1	SIL; 1	ZOL; Ret	HUN; 1	SPA; Ret	A1R; 1	NÜR; 8	JAR; 1	EST; 3	1st	60
2002	Larbre Compétition-Chéreau	Chrysler Viper GTS-R	GT	MAG; 3	SIL; 3	BRN; 2	JAR; 3	AND; 2	OSC; Ret	SPA; 1	PER; 5	DON; 5	EST; Ret		2nd	48
2003	JMB Racing	Ferrari 550 Maranello	GT	CAT; DNS	MAG; Ret	PER; Ret	BRN; Ret	DON; 11							NC	0
2003	JMB Racing	Ferrari 360 Modena GT	N-GT						SPA; Ret	AND	OSC	EST	MNZ		NC	0
2004	Scuderia Veregra	Chrysler Viper GTS-R	GT	MNZ	VAL	MAG	HOC	BRN	DON	SPA	IMO	OSC	DUB	ZHU; Ret	NC	0
