= Oksana Kosachenko =

Russian sports commentator (born 1966)

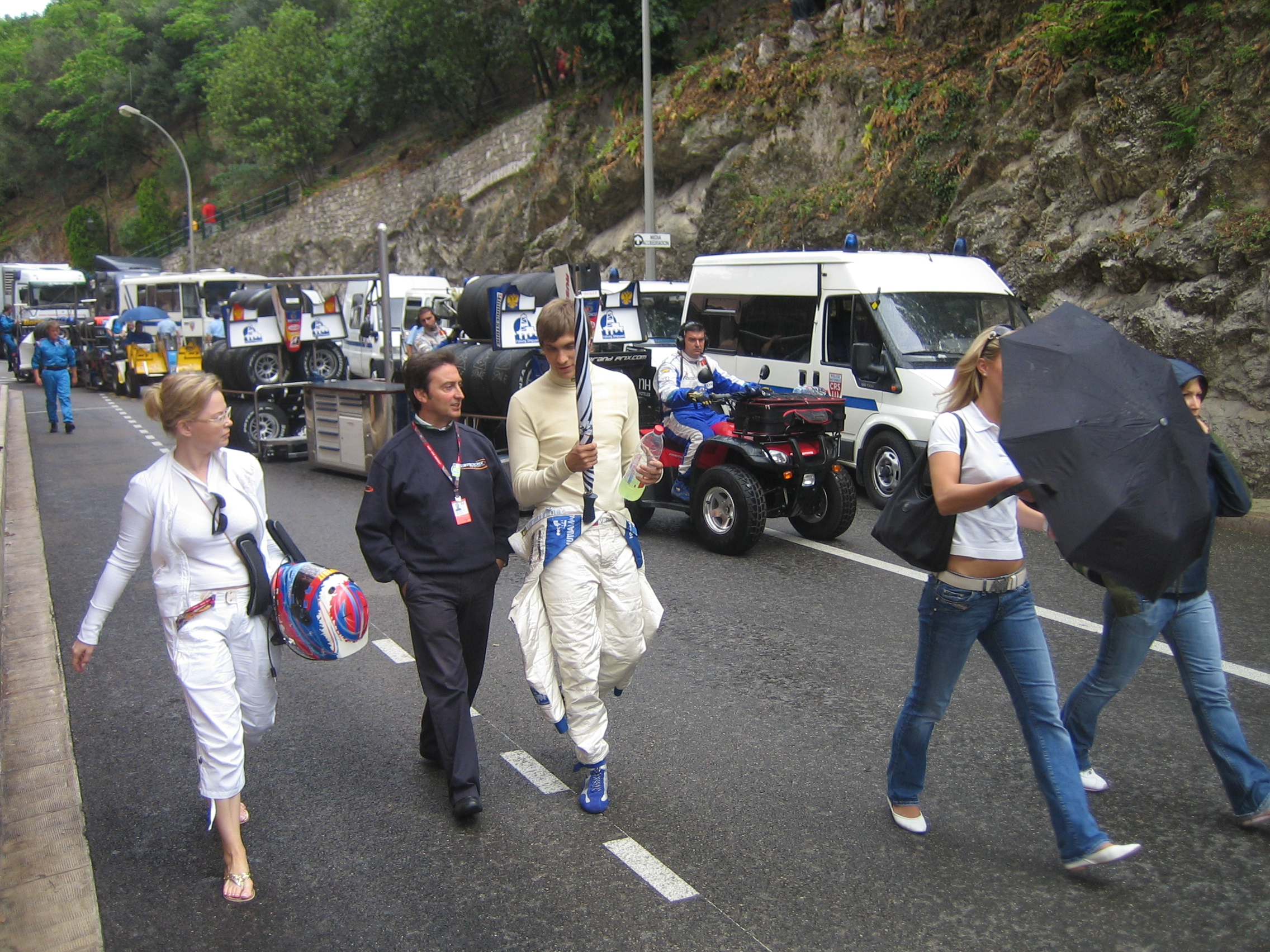
- Oksana Kosachenko pictured on the left and Vitaly Petrov at the 2007 Monaco GP2 Series round.
- Born: Oksana Pavlovna Kosachenko; 1 May 1966 (age 59); Moscow, Soviet Union

Oksana Kosachenko (born 1 May 1966) is a Russian sports commentator, organizer of automobile sports competitions, pilot, promoter of the WTCC in Russia. She worked as Vitaly Petrov's manager.

== Career ==
From 1 February 2013, until the end of the 2014 season, she served as commercial director of the Caterham F1 team, which competed in the Formula 1 World Championship.
