= 2011 German Grand Prix =

10th round of the 2011 Formula One season

Race 10 of 19 in the 2011 Formula One World Championship
← Previous race	Next race →

Race details
- Date: 24 July 2011
- Official name: Formula 1 Grosser Preis Santander von Deutschland 2011
- Location: Nürburgring, Nürburg, Germany
- Course: Permanent racing facility
- Course length: 5.148 km (3.199 miles)
- Distance: 60 laps, 308.863 km (191.919 miles)
- Weather: Cloudy, (light) rain at start

Pole position
Driver	(Australia) Mark Webber	Red Bull Racing-Renault
- Time: 1:30.079

Fastest lap
Driver	(United Kingdom) Lewis Hamilton	McLaren-Mercedes
- Time: 1:34.302 on lap 59

Podium
First	(United Kingdom) Lewis Hamilton	McLaren-Mercedes
Second	(Spain) Fernando Alonso	Ferrari
Third	(Australia) Mark Webber	Red Bull Racing-Renault

The 2011 German Grand Prix, formally the Formula 1 Grosser Preis Santander von Deutschland 2011, was a Formula One motor race that was held on 24 July 2011 at the Nürburgring in Nürburg, Germany. It was the tenth round of the 2011 Formula One season. The 60-lap race was won by McLaren's Lewis Hamilton, who had started from second position on the grid. Ferrari's Fernando Alonso finished in second place, and Mark Webber, who had started the race from pole position, completed the podium in third position for Red Bull Racing. Webber's teammate and championship leader Sebastian Vettel finished fourth, ending an eleven-race streak of finishing in the podium placings.

As a consequence of the race, Vettel's lead in the World Drivers' Championship was cut by Webber to 77 points. Hamilton's victory allowed him to move into third place in the championship, five points behind Webber in second, and four ahead of Alonso. In the World Constructors' Championship, Red Bull extended their championship lead to 112 points over McLaren, with Ferrari a further 51 points behind in third position.

== Report ==
=== Background ===
On the Thursday before the race, Team Lotus announced that Karun Chandhok would replace Jarno Trulli for the race weekend.

The start line was moved 240 m (790 ft) closer to Turn 1 than it had been before, for the weekend. This meant that the race start could be less crucial for the drivers as the distance to the first corner was roughly half what it had been before.

Tyre supplier Pirelli brought its white-banded medium compound tyre as the harder "prime" tyre and the yellow-banded soft compound as the softer "option" compound.

Before the race, Sebastian Vettel had an 80-point lead in the World Drivers' Championship - at the time, the record for the largest lead. Despite controversial team orders at the previous race in Silverstone, Mark Webber stayed second in the standings - 12 points ahead of Fernando Alonso, who had moved up to third in the standings on 112 points after his victory two weeks previously. McLaren teammates Lewis Hamilton and Jenson Button both stood on 109 points before the Grand Prix, but Hamilton was fourth through countback because he had one more second place.

As far as the Constructors were concerned, Red Bull Racing were looking good on 328 points - 110 ahead of a McLaren who had faltered somewhat at the last two races. Ferrari were third on 164 points, 54 behind McLaren, but 103 ahead of Mercedes GP who were ahead of Renault for the first time this season, after the deterioration of Renault's form had already begun. Before the race, all teams and all drivers were in Championship contention, but many were not after this race. Also, Red Bull Racing, McLaren or Ferrari couldn't have lost their respective Constructors' Championship placings during this event.

There were six German drivers at this race - including Michael Schumacher, who had won at this track 5 times in his career.

=== Practice ===
After Friday's two practice sessions, Lewis Hamilton bleakly summed up his chances of challenging Red Bull and Ferrari saying: "We won't find an answer tomorrow. We definitely can't challenge them for pole." Yet, he ended up marginally behind the pole position time, and on the front row.

In the first free practice session, Fernando Alonso set the fastest time followed by Mark Webber and then Sebastian Vettel. This started speculation that Ferrari would be matching Red Bull Racing's pace in Qualifying. It seemed likely at this point that Alonso would be on the front row of the grid – however, this was eventually not the case. Lewis Hamilton was fifth, and his teammate Button down in 11th after having no KERS for both Friday Practice sessions. With only half a minute left in the session, Sébastien Buemi made a mistake and was flung sideways across the gravel; he later missed the second Friday session because of a fuel pressure problem.

Webber led Alonso in Free Practice 2. This session also featured an extraordinary number of lock-ups and off track excursions. It was in this session Michael Schumacher left the track at Turn 7 whilst exploring the track's limits and waved to his home crowd. Another home driver, Timo Glock, also left the track, spun on the wet grass at the bottom of a hill, and luckily escaped being beached on the high curb.

=== Qualifying ===
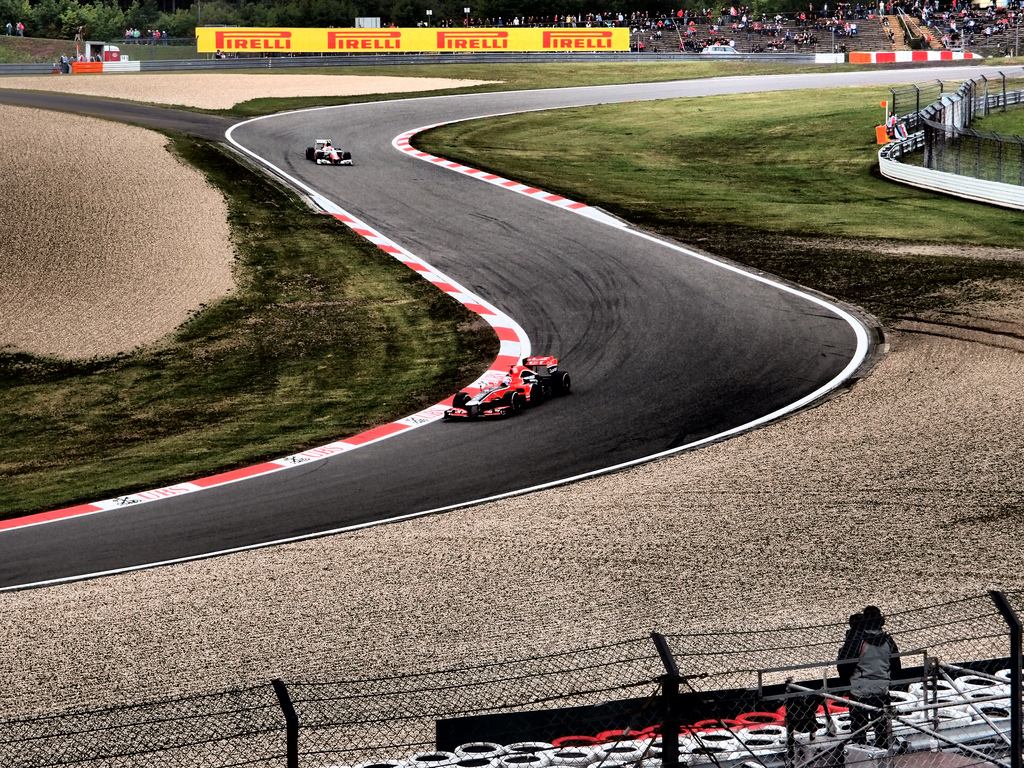
The two Virgins and the two HRTs were on the back three rows of the grid along with Karun Chandhok, who drove Jarno Trulli's Lotus during the weekend, and Sébastien Buemi, whose Toro Rosso's fuel irregularity had left him 24th.

Kamui Kobayashi was the most surprising driver to drop out in the first part of qualifying, where he only set a time fast enough for his Sauber to be in 18th place. Heikki Kovalainen out-qualified new, temporary, Lotus teammate Karun Chandhok by eight tenths of a second. The Indian said he was happy with his lap as he had never driven the circuit as an F1 driver, run the car with low fuel and slicks, used brakes not suited to his style, or used much KERS or DRS before. Chandhok was 21st fastest (which became 20th later), he and Kovalainen separated by Timo Glock's Virgin. The other Virgin of Jérôme d'Ambrosio was ahead of the two very closely matched times of the HRTs; Vitantonio Liuzzi was just ahead of new driver Daniel Ricciardo although he would start 24th (later 23rd) due to a gearbox change. Out of the fastest four teams, Felipe Massa was the only driver feeling the need to use a set of soft tyres in Q1. After qualifying was over, Sébastien Buemi was excluded due to a fuel irregularity demoting him to 24th place, therefore every driver below 16th gained a place. After Q1, on the way back to the pit lane, Timo Glock commented to his engineers on the car-to-pit radio that they were making it "difficult for him". Glock later tried to cover up his comments by saying they were meant in a joking way. Glock announced the following day he would be staying with the team until 2014.

The remaining 17 drivers all participated in the second qualifying session, and all drivers decided to use the option tyres. The two Toro Rosso cars were slowest in Q2, Buemi ahead of teammate Jaime Alguersuari. Although, Alguersuari moved up to 16th and Kobayashi into 17th once Buemi was excluded form qualifying due to a fuel irregularity demoting him to 24th position. Mexican rookie Sergio Pérez out-qualified his teammate again with 15th spot, behind the two Williams cars; Pastor Maldonado not in Q3, yet ahead of F1 veteran Rubens Barrichello on the seventh row. Force India's Paul di Resta and Nick Heidfeld in the Renault were very close to making the cut, but were both beaten by their teammates and stayed 12th and 11th respectively. This was only the 3rd time in 10 races that Force India driver Adrian Sutil out-qualified his rookie teammate, and Vitaly Petrov's Renault entered the top 10 for the first time since Canada. Paul di Resta later said he suffered from grip problems in Qualifying.

For the final part of qualifying, all the remaining drivers went out on the option tyres, and all except the two Mercedes cars and Sutil's Force India chose to do two runs – who chose to do only two flying laps at the end of the session. Lewis Hamilton started the session by initially setting provisional pole, although he was quickly beaten by Ferrari's Fernando Alonso. Ferrari looked on very good form at the last race in Silverstone and continue that good form by matching Red Bull Racing in practice. Alonso's pole looked like a solid time until Red Bull came out of the pit lane, Mark Webber beating Alonso by four tenths and Sebastian Vettel fitting in between the two. On these four drivers last efforts, Alonso went faster but failed to improve his time and stayed third. Webber then went quicker by another tenth on a great lap, and then Hamilton posted a stunning lap – only five hundredths slower than Webber's and beating all the critics who said McLaren had easily fallen behind Ferrari. This pushed Alonso down to fourth. Vettel then improved his lap, but stayed third – the first time since Monza the previous year he had not qualified on the front row; but, he was only 0.137 seconds behind pole position. This was Webber's second successive pole, and his third of the season. Home favourites Mercedes qualified sixth and tenth with Nico Rosberg ahead of Michael Schumacher – who had won at this circuit five times – for the ninth time this season. Ferrari's Felipe Massa was sixth tenths behind his teammate, as Alonso continued to outclass him, in fifth place. Jenson Button was disappointed after he qualified seventh, 1.2 seconds behind Hamilton, he stated it was due to lack of grip and understeer during his lap. Adrian Sutil (eighth), Vitaly Petrov (ninth) and Michael Schumacher rounded out the top 10. Four of the six Germans in the field qualified in the top ten at their home Grand Prix.

=== Race ===
At the start of the race, Mark Webber made a slow start from pole position; he 'bogged down' with too low revs, allowing Hamilton to take the lead. The Ferraris were on the inside and outside of Vettel as they approached the first turn, and Alonso managed to get ahead of Vettel. Massa had made another good start but after being on the outside of Vettel at Turn 1, he eventually slipped behind Nico Rosberg into sixth place. Jenson Button had a poor start, slipping down from seventh to tenth in the first lap. Contrastly, Michael Schumacher had another good start moving from tenth to eighth on lap 1. Meanwhile, further back Nick Heidfeld and Paul di Resta made contact and dropped to the back of the field. After that, Hamilton was leading the race from Webber, Alonso, Vettel, Rosberg and Massa. Sutil was in seventh, after a good start, followed by Schumacher, Petrov and Button completing the top 10.

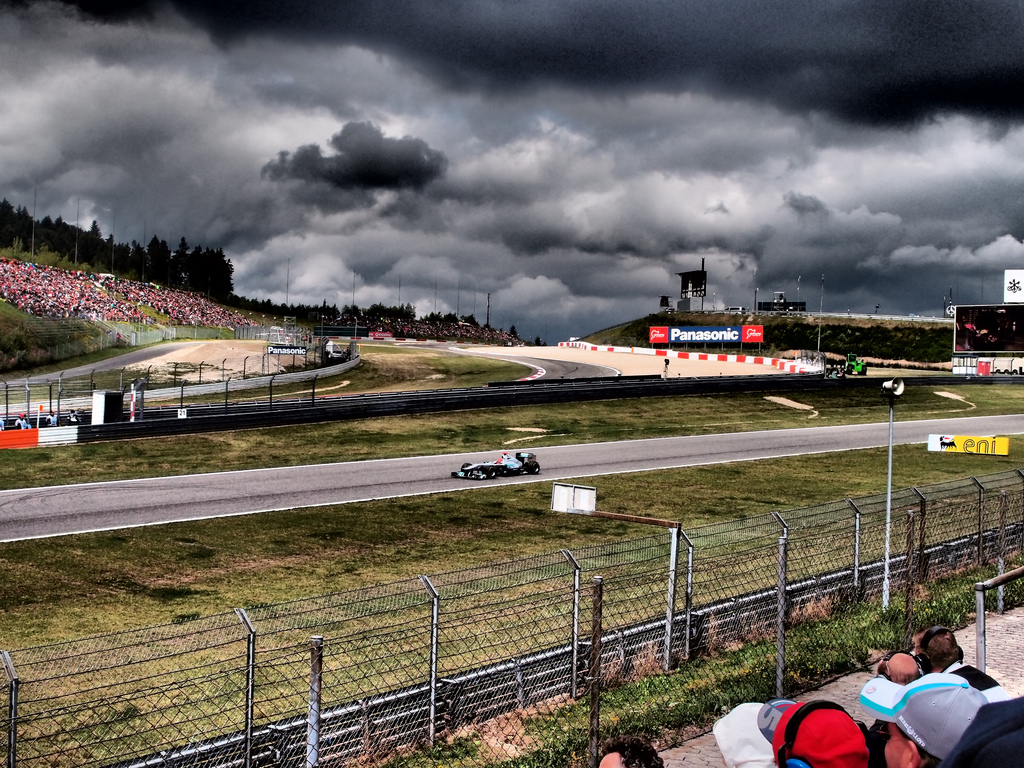
Michael Schumacher finished the race in eighth position.

On the fourth lap, Alonso ran wide at Turn 2 getting a wheel on the wet grass, forcing him onto the tarmac. This allowed Vettel to gain third place. Only a few laps later though, Alonso repassed Vettel into Turn 1. Later, on lap 16, Rubens Barrichello suffered an engine failure, however he was able to limp back to the pits.

Heidfeld received a drive-through penalty for causing an avoidable accident with di Resta, but did not have time to serve it. Whilst trying to make progress through the field, he was squeezed off the track by Sébastien Buemi at the chicane and crashed out. Buemi had to pit for new tyres, and was later given a five-place grid penalty at the next race, the Hungarian Grand Prix. Di Resta, fought his way through the field to finish in thirteenth by the end of the race.

Vitaly Petrov was defending very well against Button's McLaren for ninth place; whilst Felipe Massa overtook Rosberg's Mercedes for fifth place after Massa's Ferrari engineer, Rob Smedley, had told him it was necessary for his strategy to work. Button eventually passed Petrov and started closing on Schumacher. Before the first round of pit stops, Hamilton ran wide allowing Webber to come up the inside of him through the final corner. Hamilton instantly dived up the inside on the run down to Turn 1 and repassed Webber.

Vettel spun at Turn 10 putting him eleven seconds behind third placed Fernando Alonso, the first three positions were covered by just three seconds and Vettel was lapping half a second slower than them. At the pit stops, Webber pitted first in an attempt to get the undercut and came out behind Sutil, but managed to work it out, passing Vettel and catching Massa when Hamilton and Alonso pitted at the same time, bringing them just out of the pits as soon as Webber and Massa were braking for turn 1. Massa took the lead ahead of Webber, Hamilton and Alonso with Vettel pitting to ninth place. When Massa pitted he dropped to eighth, just in front of Vettel starting a new battle. After these stops Webber had undercut Hamilton into the lead – leading a race for the first time in the season – with Alonso in third position. During the pit stop phase the two Mercedes cars were closing on Petrov's Renault in the DRS zone leading to the Veedol Chicane. Rosberg passed Petrov on the straight and Schumacher followed him through. Schumacher later spun at exactly the same place as Vettel, falling behind both Sutil and Petrov.

It looked as if Sutil and Button's two-stop strategies were successful as Sutil got ahead of Rosberg in the later pit stops and finished the race in sixth place. Button was also going strong – catching and passing many drivers including Rosberg for sixth at Turn 1 when Rosberg outbraked himself and ran wide. Button, like Sutil, was only passed in the pit-line and not on the track, although his bad luck continued from Silverstone and he suffered his second successive mechanical retirement, with a hydraulics failure. Only two laps later, Vitantonio Liuzzi became the fourth and final retirement of the race when his car had an electrical failure.

Towards the front, Massa and Vettel started to move through the field, passing Kobayashi and Petrov. In the second pit-stop phase Webber pitted first, but was lapping slowly after stop struggling to get the new tyres up to temperature. The mechanical grip of Hamilton's McLaren in cold conditions helped him, and he got past Webber in the stops with the opposite effect of the undercut. Webber tried to overtake Hamilton on the outside of Turn 2, Hamilton kept him behind. Alonso was the last to pit, and came out in the lead, but due to his tyres not being at operating temperature, Hamilton made an easy pass at Turn 2 and got past Alonso to retake the lead.

Hamilton was then first to pit for the medium compound tyres and got out in front of Alonso and Webber, he pulled away and took the race victory. All the drivers on three-stop strategies pitted for the primes in the last ten laps – not wanting to go on to the medium compound, which was 1.5 seconds slower per lap than the softer tyres, for too long. The battle between Massa and Vettel for fourth went to the pits on the penultimate lap, Massa had a slower pit stop than Vettel, and Vettel got out in front after he had not been able to pass on track. After the top 3, Vettel, Massa and Sutil completed the top six with Rosberg ahead of Schumacher, Kobayashi, from 17th on the grid, finished in ninth and Petrov completed the points finishers in tenth, ahead of Kobayashi's teammate Sergio Pérez. After the race, Fernando Alonso stopped his Ferrari on the circuit, and got a lift back to parc ferme on the sidepod of Mark Webber's Red Bull.

== Classification ==
=== Qualifying ===
Pos	No	Driver	Constructor	Part 1	Part 2	Part 3	Grid
1	2	(Australia) Mark Webber	Red Bull Racing-Renault	1:33.096	1:31.311	1:30.079	1
2	3	(United Kingdom) Lewis Hamilton	McLaren-Mercedes	1:32.934	1:30.998	1:30.134	2
3	1	(Germany) Sebastian Vettel	Red Bull Racing-Renault	1:32.973	1:31.017	1:30.216	3
4	5	(Spain) Fernando Alonso	Ferrari	1:32.916	1:31.150	1:30.442	4
5	6	(Brazil) Felipe Massa	Ferrari	1:31.826	1:31.582	1:30.910	5
6	8	(Germany) Nico Rosberg	Mercedes	1:32.785	1:31.343	1:31.263	6
7	4	(United Kingdom) Jenson Button	McLaren-Mercedes	1:33.224	1:31.532	1:31.288	7
8	14	(Germany) Adrian Sutil	Force India-Mercedes	1:32.286	1:31.809	1:32.010	8
9	10	(Russia) Vitaly Petrov	Renault	1:33.187	1:31.985	1:32.187	9
10	7	(Germany) Michael Schumacher	Mercedes	1:32.603	1:32.180	1:32.482	10
11	9	(Germany) Nick Heidfeld	Renault	1:32.505	1:32.215		11
12	15	(United Kingdom) Paul di Resta	Force India-Mercedes	1:32.651	1:32.560		12
13	12	(Venezuela) Pastor Maldonado	Williams-Cosworth	1:33.003	1:32.635		13
14	11	(Brazil) Rubens Barrichello	Williams-Cosworth	1:33.664	1:33.043		14
15	17	(Mexico) Sergio Pérez	Sauber-Ferrari	1:33.295	1:33.176		15
EX	18	(Switzerland) Sébastien Buemi	Toro Rosso-Ferrari	1:33.635	1:33.546		24^{1}
16	19	(Spain) Jaime Alguersuari	Toro Rosso-Ferrari	1:33.658	1:33.698		16
17	16	(Japan) Kamui Kobayashi	Sauber-Ferrari	1:33.786			17
18	20	(Finland) Heikki Kovalainen	Lotus-Renault	1:35.599			18
19	24	(Germany) Timo Glock	Virgin-Cosworth	1:36.400			19
20	21	(India) Karun Chandhok	Lotus-Renault	1:36.422			20
21	25	(Belgium) Jérôme d'Ambrosio	Virgin-Cosworth	1:36.641			21
22	23	(Italy) Vitantonio Liuzzi	HRT-Cosworth	1:37.011			23^{2}
23	22	(Australia) Daniel Ricciardo	HRT-Cosworth	1:37.036			22
107% time: 1:38.254

Notes:

1. – Sebastien Buemi was excluded from qualifying for an irregularity with the fuel in his Toro Rosso.
2. – Vitantonio Liuzzi received a five-place grid penalty for a gearbox change.

=== Race ===
Pos	No	Driver	Constructor	Laps	Time/Retired	Grid	Points
1	3	(United Kingdom) Lewis Hamilton	McLaren-Mercedes	60	1:37:30.334	2	25
2	5	(Spain) Fernando Alonso	Ferrari	60	+3.980	4	18
3	2	(Australia) Mark Webber	Red Bull Racing-Renault	60	+9.788	1	15
4	1	(Germany) Sebastian Vettel	Red Bull Racing-Renault	60	+47.921	3	12
5	6	(Brazil) Felipe Massa	Ferrari	60	+52.252	5	10
6	14	(Germany) Adrian Sutil	Force India-Mercedes	60	+1:26.208	8	8
7	8	(Germany) Nico Rosberg	Mercedes	59	+1 Lap	6	6
8	7	(Germany) Michael Schumacher	Mercedes	59	+1 Lap	10	4
9	16	(Japan) Kamui Kobayashi	Sauber-Ferrari	59	+1 Lap	17	2
10	10	(Russia) Vitaly Petrov	Renault	59	+1 Lap	9	1
11	17	(Mexico) Sergio Pérez	Sauber-Ferrari	59	+1 Lap	15	
12	19	(Spain) Jaime Alguersuari	Toro Rosso-Ferrari	59	+1 Lap	16	
13	15	(United Kingdom) Paul di Resta	Force India-Mercedes	59	+1 Lap	12	
14	12	(Venezuela) Pastor Maldonado	Williams-Cosworth	59	+1 Lap	13	
15	18	(Switzerland) Sébastien Buemi	Toro Rosso-Ferrari	59	+1 Lap	24	
16	20	(Finland) Heikki Kovalainen	Lotus-Renault	58	+2 Laps	18	
17	24	(Germany) Timo Glock	Virgin-Cosworth	57	+3 Laps	19	
18	25	(Belgium) Jérôme d'Ambrosio	Virgin-Cosworth	57	+3 Laps	21	
19	22	(Australia) Daniel Ricciardo	HRT-Cosworth	57	+3 Laps	22	
20	21	(India) Karun Chandhok	Lotus-Renault	56	+4 Laps	20	
Ret	23	(Italy) Vitantonio Liuzzi	HRT-Cosworth	37	Electrical	23	
Ret	4	(United Kingdom) Jenson Button	McLaren-Mercedes	35	Hydraulics	7	
Ret	11	(Brazil) Rubens Barrichello	Williams-Cosworth	16	Engine	14	
Ret	9	(Germany) Nick Heidfeld	Renault	9	Collision	11	

== Championship standings after the race ==
Drivers' Championship standings

	Pos.	Driver	Points
	1	(Germany) Sebastian Vettel	216
	2	(Australia) Mark Webber	139
1	3	(United Kingdom) Lewis Hamilton	134
1	4	(Spain) Fernando Alonso	130
	5	(United Kingdom) Jenson Button	109

Constructors' Championship standings

Pos.	Constructor	Points
1	(Austria) Red Bull Racing-Renault	355
2	(United Kingdom) McLaren-Mercedes	243
3	(Italy) Ferrari	192
4	(Germany) Mercedes	78
5	(United Kingdom) Renault	66

- Note: Only the top five positions are included for both sets of standings.

== See also ==
- 2011 Nürburgring GP2 Series round
- 2011 Nürburgring GP3 Series round

Previous race: 2011 British Grand Prix	FIA Formula One World Championship; 2011 season	Next race: 2011 Hungarian Grand Prix
Previous race: 2010 German Grand Prix	German Grand Prix	Next race: 2012 German Grand Prix
