= Formula One drivers from Russia =

List of Formula One drivers who competed as Russians

- Drivers: 3
- Grands Prix: 191
- Entries: 191
- Starts: 188
- Best season finish: 7th (2015)
- Wins: 0
- Podiums: 4
- Pole positions: 0
- Fastest laps: 2
- Points: 267
- First entry: 2010 Bahrain Grand Prix
- Latest entry: 2020 Abu Dhabi Grand Prix
- 2026 drivers: None

There have been three Formula One drivers who raced as Russians,^{1} two of whom have scored podium positions in Grands Prix.

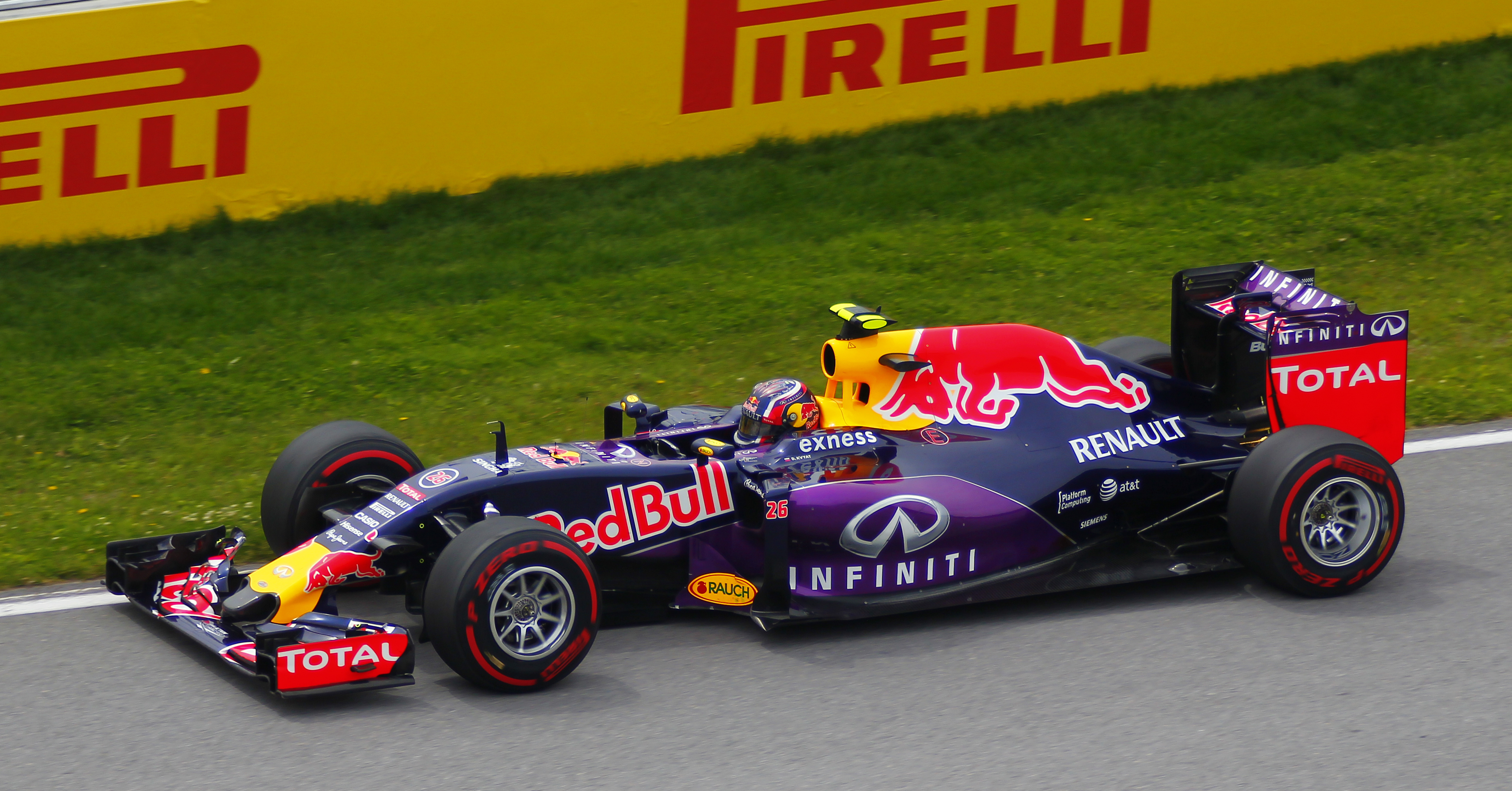
Kvyat driving for Red Bull at the 2015 Canadian Grand Prix

Nikita Mazepin raced representing the Russian Automobile Federation as neutral competitor due to sporting regulations in effect through 2021, so he is not counted as driver representing Russia in this article.

== Former drivers ==
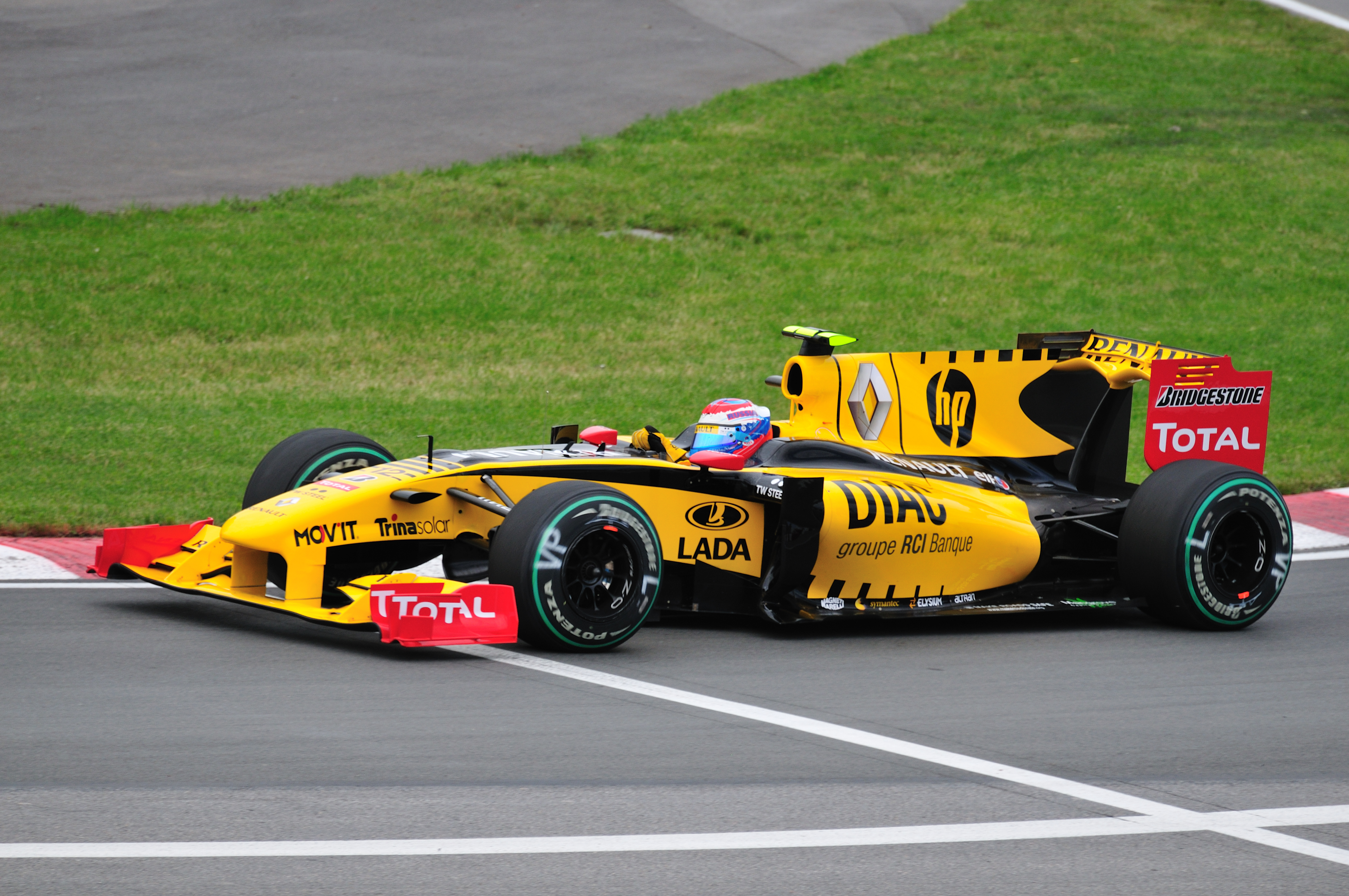
Petrov driving for Renault at the 2010 Canadian Grand Prix.

When Vitaly Petrov made his Grand Prix debut for Renault at the 2010 Bahrain Grand Prix he became the first driver from Russia or the former Soviet Union to compete in Formula One. His debut season yielded 13th place in the championship and a best result of 5th in Hungary – however he gained notoriety for blocking Fernando Alonso in Abu Dhabi and costing Alonso a chance at the title win. His 2011 season with the newly re-branded Lotus-Renault team began strongly with 3rd place at the season-opener in Australia but the car failed to maintain consistent competitiveness and he ended the season 10th in the standings. For 2012 he was dropped by Lotus and picked up by Caterham. With an inferior car he failed to score a point all season, but did finish a strong 11th in his final race in Brazil. He was not retained for the 2013 season.

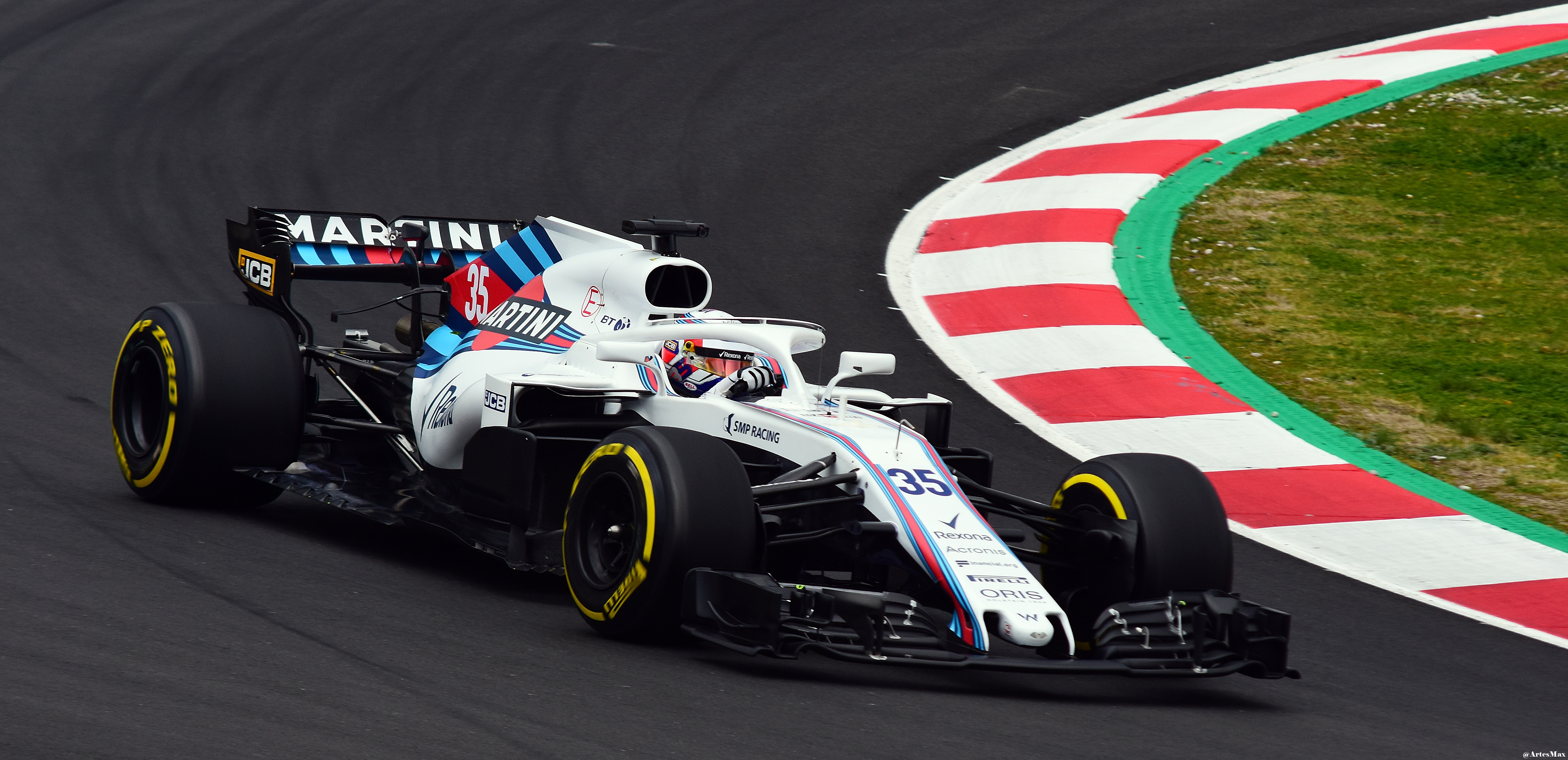
Sirotkin testing for Williams at the Circuit de Barcelona-Catalunya

Sergey Sirotkin made his debut for Williams at the 2018 Australian Grand Prix. He would score a solitary point at the 2018 Italian Grand Prix in the uncompetitive Williams FW41. He was replaced by Robert Kubica for 2019.

Daniil Kvyat became the second Russian to compete in Formula One when he debuted with Toro Rosso at the 2014 Australian Grand Prix. He finished his first race in 9th place – an equal best result for the season matched in Britain and Belgium. He finished 15th in the championship. He was hired by Red Bull Racing for the 2015 season, finishing 7th in the championship with a career-best 2nd in Hungary. Despite finishing 3rd in China the following year, after his home race he was demoted back to Toro Rosso and was subsequently replaced by Max Verstappen. After having scored only 5 points in the 2017 season by the 2017 United States Grand Prix, he was dropped from Toro Rosso and replaced with Pierre Gasly. He raced again for Toro Rosso in the 2019 season and scored a podium for Toro Rosso at the 2019 German Grand Prix, held at the Hockenheimring, after a strong strategy in changing conditions and a move on Lance Stroll in the closing stages to secure 3rd place, scoring the third podium of his career. He was retained by Toro Rosso as the team changed its name to AlphaTauri for 2020.

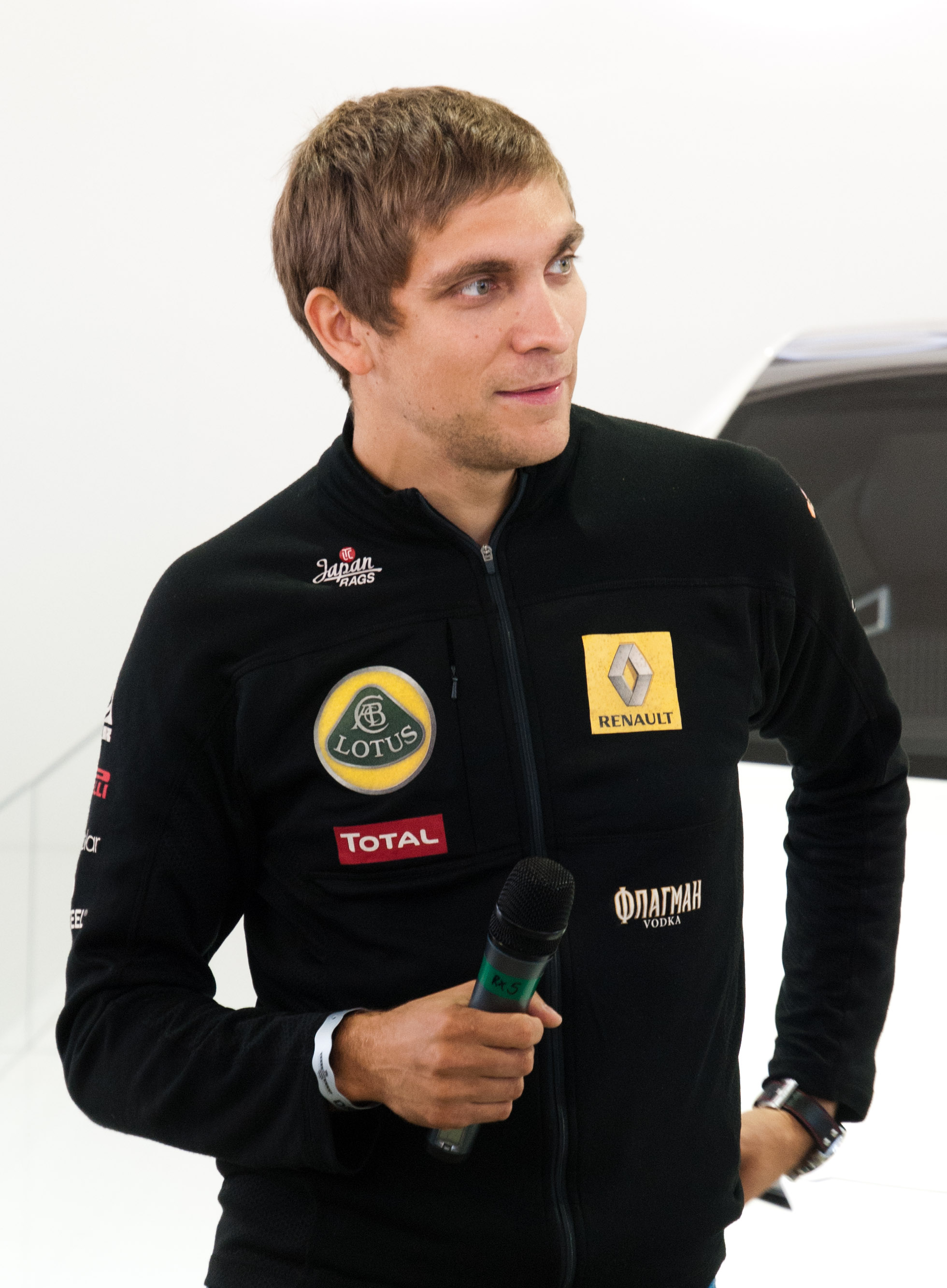
Vitaly Petrov

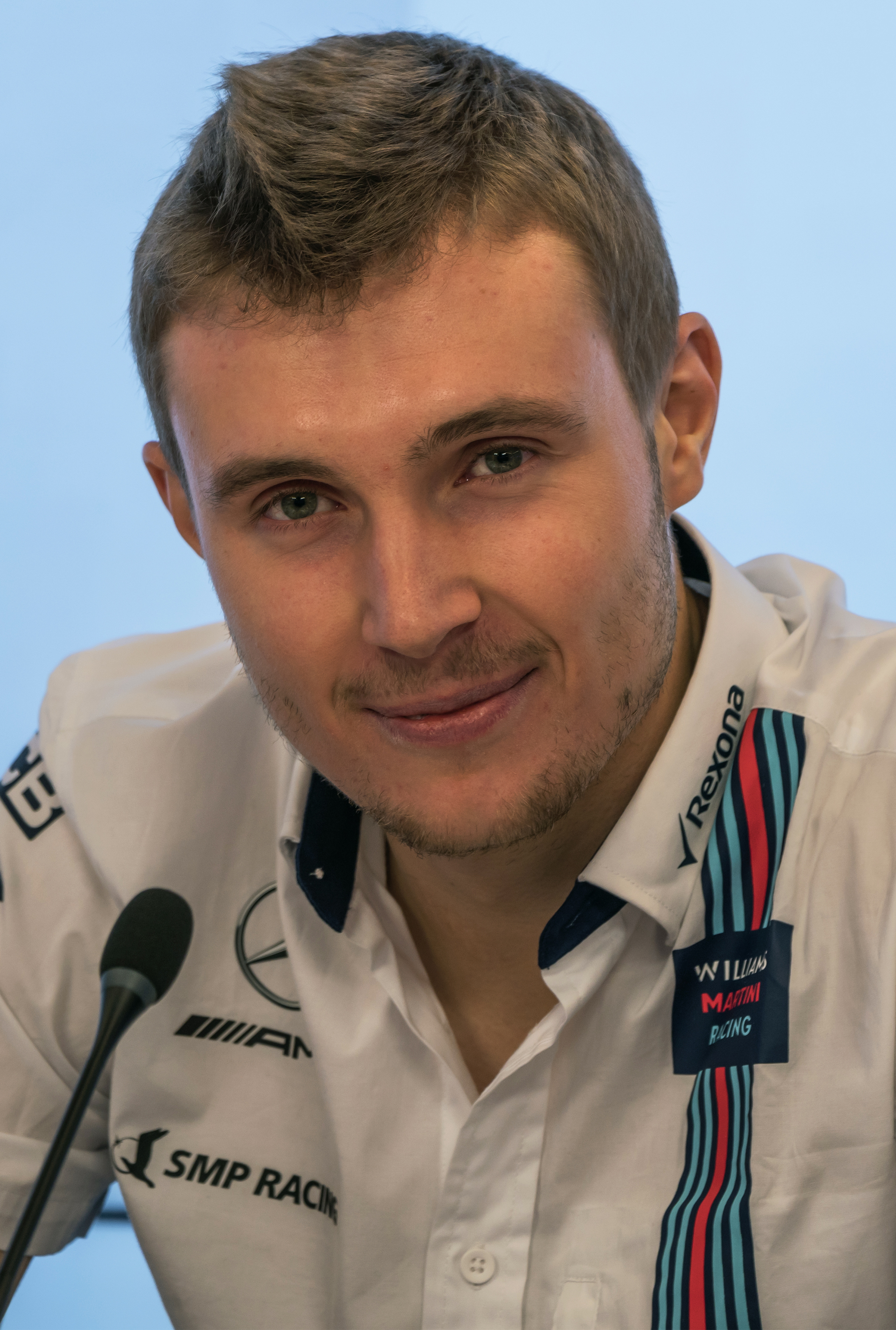
Sergey Sirotkin

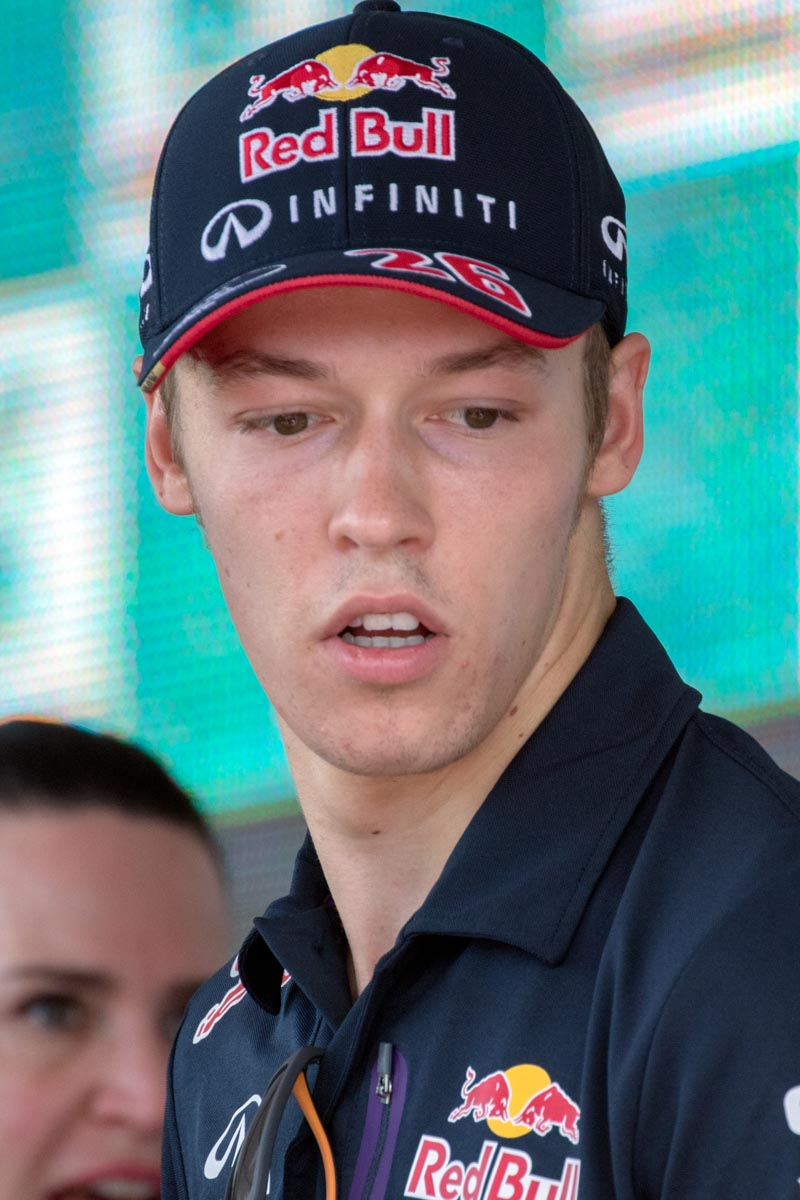
Daniil Kvyat

== Timeline ==
Drivers	Active Years	Entries	Wins	Podiums	Career Points	Poles	Fastest Laps
Vitaly Petrov	2010–2012	58 (57 starts)	0	1	64	0	1
Daniil Kvyat	2014–2017, 2019–2020	112 (110 starts)	0	3	202	0	1
Sergey Sirotkin	2018	21	0	0	1	0	0

- ^1Note: Nikita Mazepin raced representing the Russian Automobile Federation due to sporting regulations in effect through 2021.
