= Vitaly Petrov =

Russian racing driver (born 1984)

- Вита́лий Петро́в
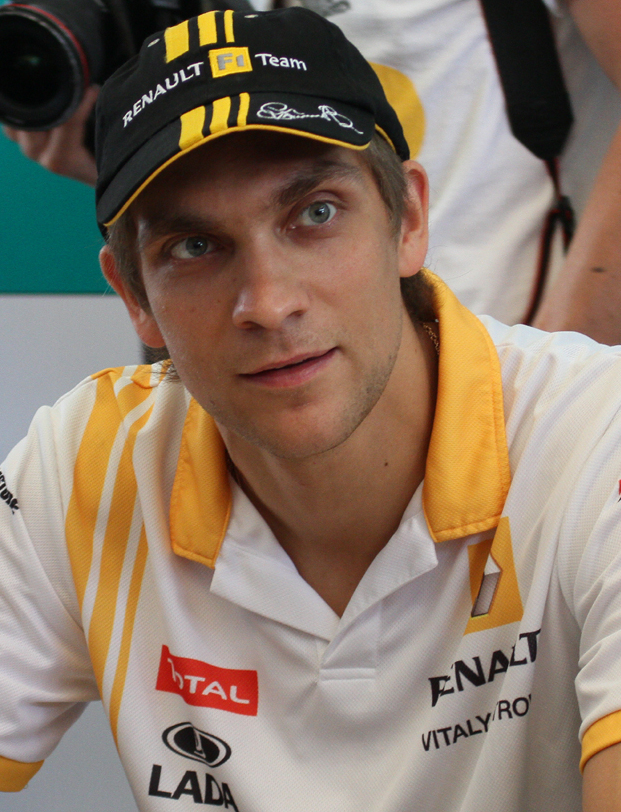
- Petrov at the 2010 Malaysian Grand Prix
- Born: Vitaly Aleksandrovich Petrov; 8 September 1984 (age 42); Vyborg, Russian SFSR, Soviet Union

Formula One World Championship career
- Nationality: (Russia) Russian
- Active years: 2010–2012
- Team(s): Renault, Caterham
- Entries: 58 (57 starts)
- Championships: 0
- Wins: 0
- Podiums: 1
- Career points: 64
- Pole positions: 0
- Fastest laps: 1
- First entry: 2010 Bahrain Grand Prix
- Last entry: 2012 Brazilian Grand Prix

FIA World Endurance Championship career
- Categorisation: FIA Platinum
- Years active: 2016–2019
- Teams: SMP, Manor
- Starts: 26
- Championships: 0
- Wins: 0
- Podiums: 5
- Poles: 0
- Fastest laps: 0
- Best finish: 4th in 2018–19 (LMP1)

24 Hours of Le Mans career
- Years: 2007, 2016–2019
- Teams: Courage, SMP, Manor
- Best finish: 3rd (2019)
- Class wins: 0

Vitaly Aleksandrovich Petrov (Russian: Вита́лий Алекса́ндрович Петро́в, IPA: [vʲɪˈtalʲɪj ɐlʲɪkˈsandrəvʲɪt͡ɕ pʲɪˈtrof]; born 8 September 1984) is a Russian racing driver, who currently competes in the 2025 Middle East Trophy for SMP Racing, He previously competed in Formula One from 2010 to 2012.

Born and raised in Vyborg, Petrov began his career in rallying, skipping competitive kart racing altogether. Petrov competed for Renault and Caterham in Formula One, becoming the first Russian driver to compete in Formula One at the 2010 Bahrain Grand Prix. Widely known as the "Vyborg Rocket" in Russia, (Note: Russian: Выборгская Ракета) Petrov scored his only podium finish at the 2011 Australian Grand Prix.

== Early career ==
Unlike most top drivers, Petrov did not begin his career in karting, as there was very little motorsport where he lived. He began competing in motorsport in 1998, when he took part in rally sprints and ice races. Afterwards, he began competing in the Russian Lada Cup in 2001 and gained Oksana Kosachenko as his manager in 2001. He remained in the series for 2002 dominating the championship, winning each round to amass the maximum points total of 500.

In 2003, Petrov began racing in the Formula Renault championships. His main campaign was in the Italian Formula Renault Championship for Euronova Racing, finishing 19th overall. During the year, he competed in several rounds of the Eurocup Formula Renault 2.0, the Formula Renault 2.0 UK series, and finished fourth in the British Formula Renault Winter Series at the end of the year, taking one win. He also made his debut in Euro Formula 3000 at Cagliari.

In 2004, Petrov turned his attention to the inaugural season of the Russian Lada Revolution championship. He started every race from pole position, but finished as runner-up. He also made selected appearances in Formula Renault and Euro F3000. Petrov remained in Russia for 2005, winning the Lada Revolution Championship with ten wins and the Russian Formula 1600 series with five wins.

== European series ==
In 2006, Petrov raced in Euroseries 3000 with Euronova Racing. He finished third in the standings, scoring nine podiums in eighteen races including four wins at Hungaroring, Mugello Circuit, Silverstone Circuit and Circuit de Catalunya. Also he participated in the Brno round of the 2006 F3000 International Masters season, where he took a pole position. During the 2006 season Petrov made his debut in the GP2 Series for David Price Racing. He replaced French driver Olivier Pla, who lost his sponsorship from Direxiv in the team from the German round onwards.

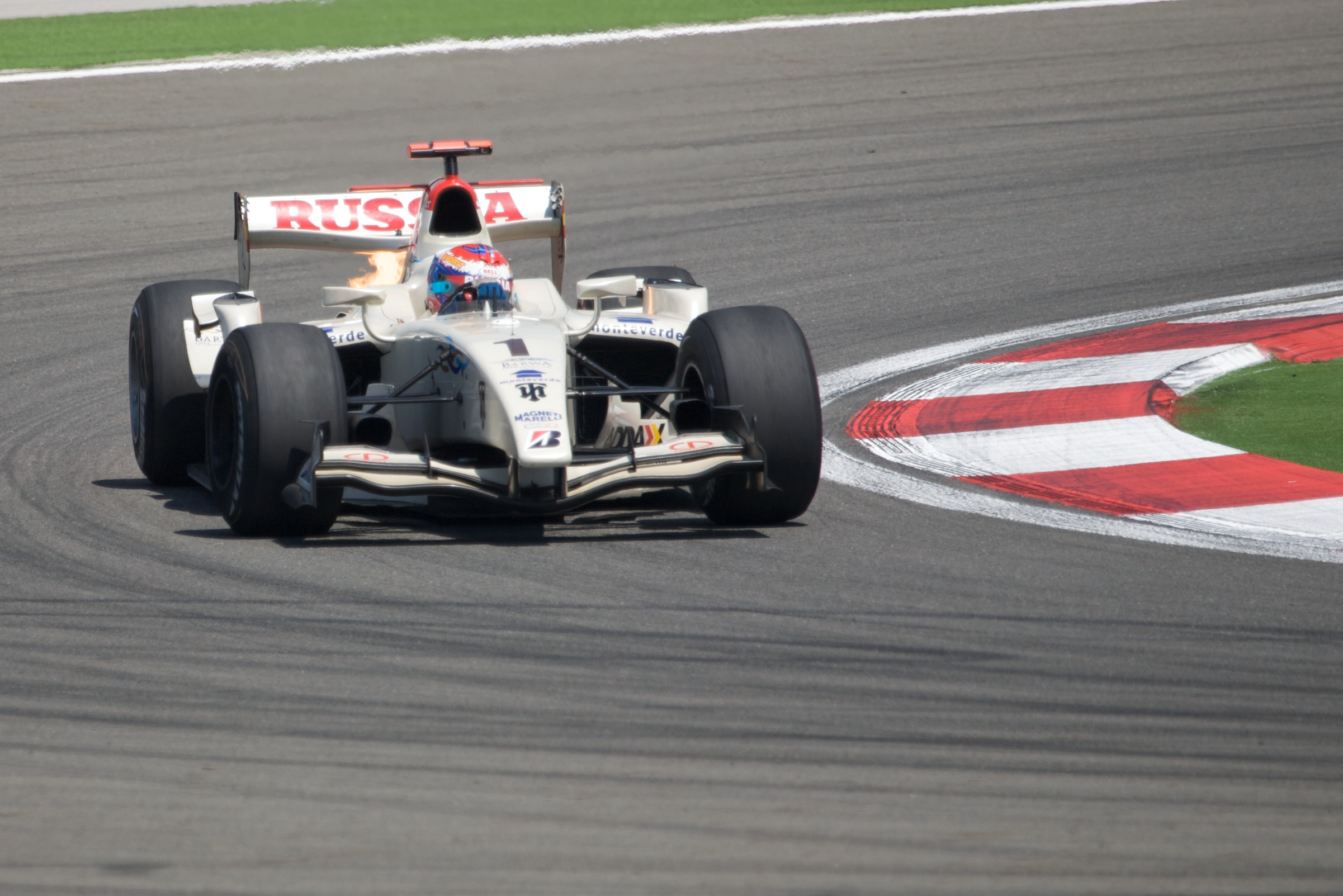
Petrov took his first win of the 2009 GP2 Series season at the Turkish round.

In 2007, Petrov moved to Campos Grand Prix, where he joined Giorgio Pantano. He scored five-point-scoring positions from 21 races and took his first victory at Valencia on his way to finishing 13th in the standings. He competed in several Le Mans Series races throughout the year, including the 24 Hours of Le Mans in a Courage Compétition LMP2 car. The car completed 198 laps before retiring from the race, being classified in 38th.

Petrov finished in third position with one win at Sepang International Circuit in the 2008 GP2 Asia Series season for Campos, behind champion Romain Grosjean and Sébastien Buemi. In the main series Petrov remained with the Campos team. He finished seventh in final standings, taking a win at the Valencia Street Circuit. He finished fifth, with a win in the Sepang sprint race, in the 2008–09 GP2 Asia Series season for Campos.

Petrov stayed with the team for 2009, now rebranded as Barwa Addax, and finished as runner-up to the dominant Nico Hülkenberg in the championship, winning twice at Istanbul Park and Valencia Street Circuit.

== Formula One ==
=== Renault (2010–2011) ===
==== 2010 ====
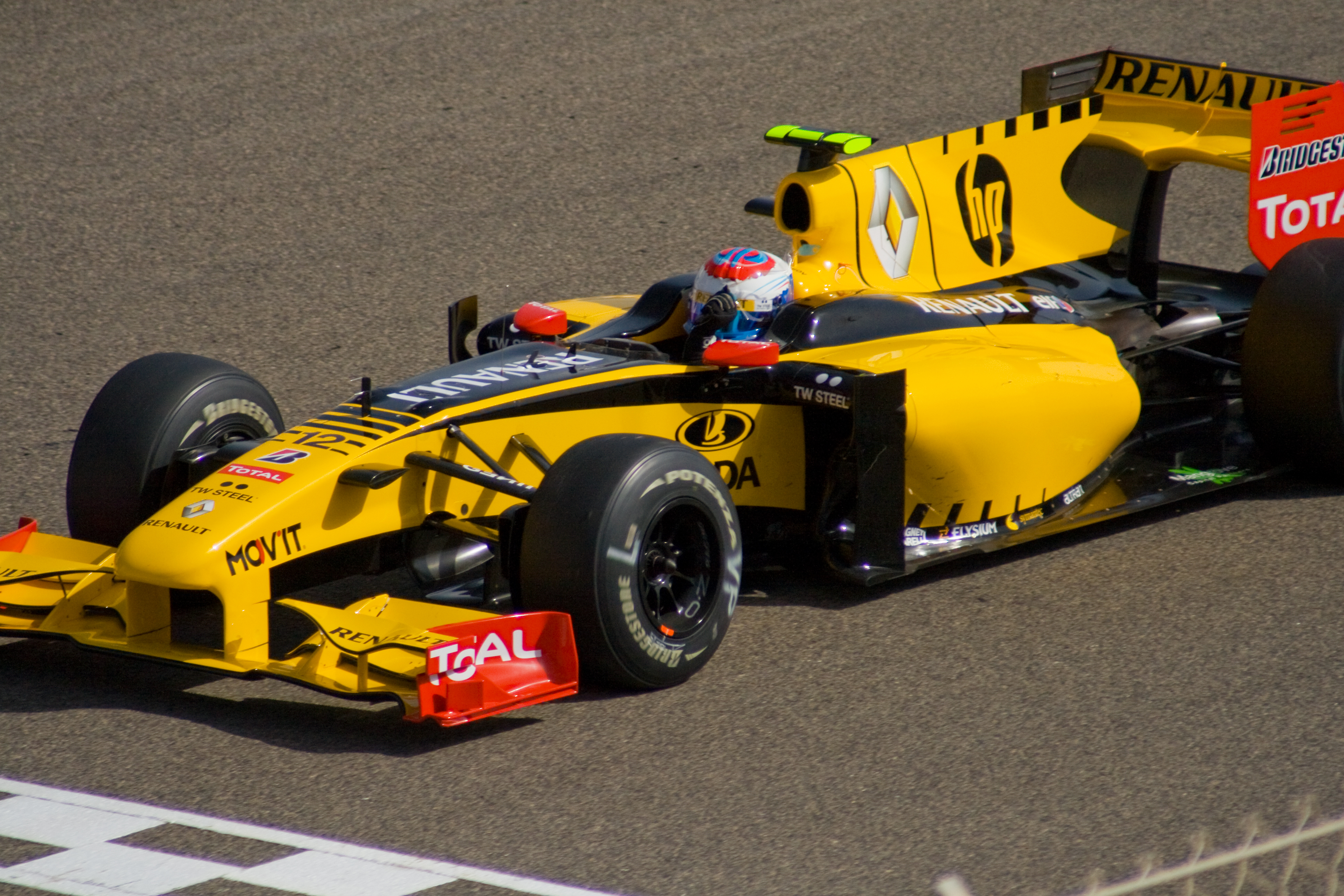
When Petrov drove for Renault at the 2010 Bahrain Grand Prix, it was the first time a Russian had driven in the Formula One World Championship.

Petrov was linked to joining Sauber, Renault F1 and Campos for the 2010 season. He was announced as a Renault driver on 31 January and thus became the first Russian driver in the Formula One World Championship. He was signed for a one-year deal, with an option for a further two. He was very close to signing for Campos but he felt Renault was the best option for him. He also mentioned that he had no major sponsors from Russia backing him just his dad and some of his friends. Some of his dad's friends included Vladimir Putin who drove the Renault F1 car and on 4 January 2011 revealed that Sergei Chemezov of Rostec and Leonid Mikhelson of Novatek would provide financial assistance to the Renault F1 team and its driver Petrov. Previously, on 1 March 2010, Carlos Ghosn met with Putin to announce that Renault F1 would have Petrov as its driver after Petrov's manager, Oksana Kosachenko, had sent a letter to Putin asking Putin for assistance. Alexander Petrov, Vitaly's father, admitted that his best friend "Antiquary" or Ilya Traber, who is the leader of the Vyborg Russian Mafia and is a close friend of Putin, is a major sponsor of the Renault F1 team and its driver Vitaly Petrov, too. Petrov stated that his goal is to start scoring points by mid-season. His teammate for his debut season with the new Renault R30 car was Robert Kubica. After qualifying seventeenth, Petrov's first race ended prematurely when the team found his right-front suspension strut to be damaged, which the Russian suspected to have been caused by hitting a kerb too hard. He had been chasing Rubens Barrichello for tenth place and a World Championship point at the time of the incident.

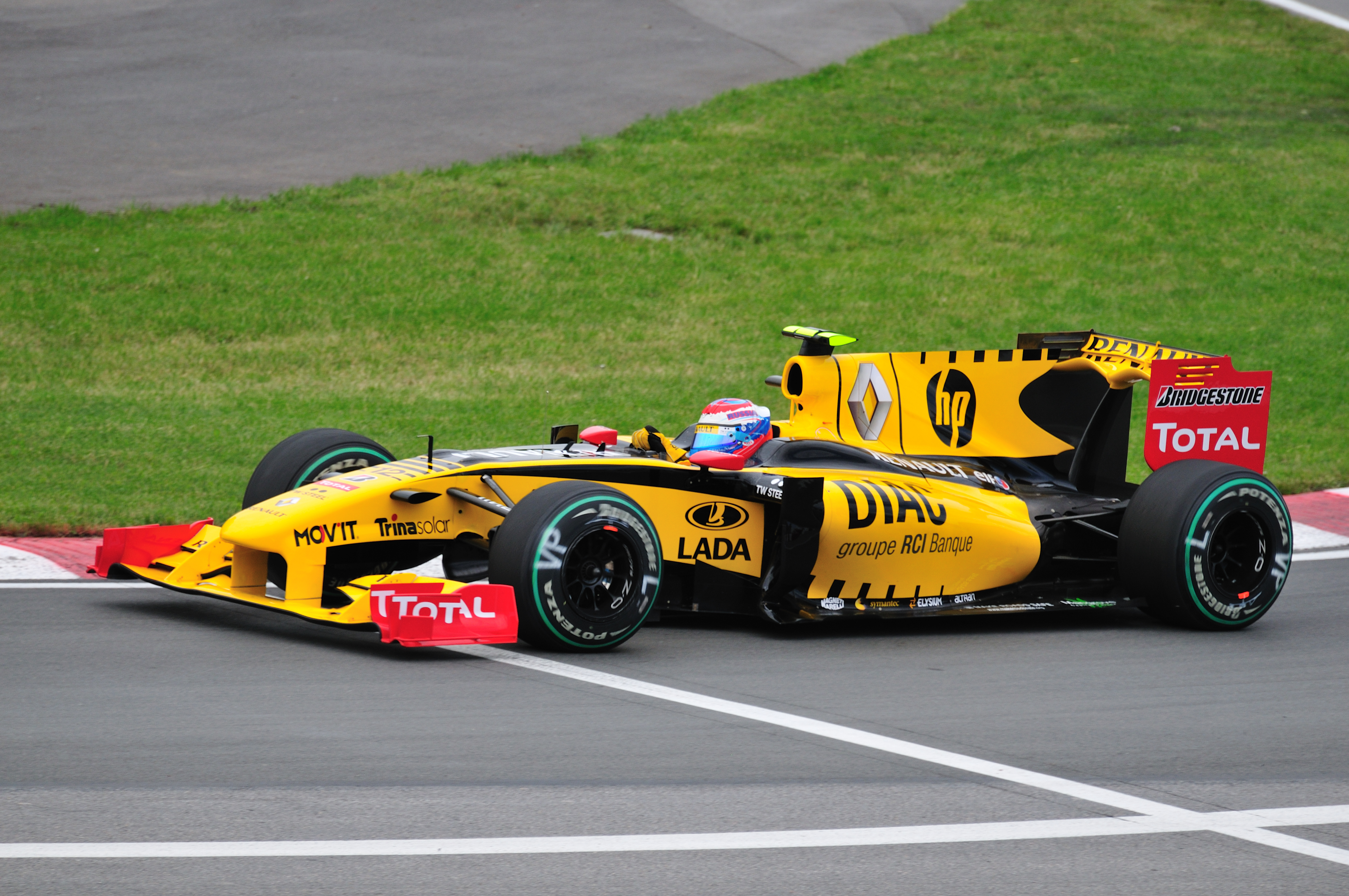
Petrov driving for Renault at the 2010 Canadian Grand Prix.

Petrov finished his first race at the Chinese Grand Prix, and in doing so, scored his first F1 points, as he finished in seventh position. This race was also noted for his overtakes of Michael Schumacher and Mark Webber under heavy rain. After qualifying for the Turkish Grand Prix he started ninth. But after a collision with Fernando Alonso in the closing laps, he suffered a puncture and was forced to make a pitstop. On returning to the track, he set the fastest lap of the race, finishing fifteenth.

In Hungary, Petrov qualified seventh, ahead of much respected teammate Robert Kubica, with Petrov finishing the race in fifth place. In Belgium, Petrov started in 23rd place, after failing to set a time in qualifying because of a first-session crash. He made up 14 places in changeable conditions to finish ninth, resulting in his third consecutive points finish. Petrov retired on the first lap of the Japanese Grand Prix after colliding with Nico Hülkenberg, and crashed out of seventh place in the Korean Grand Prix. He qualified tenth for the final round of the season in Abu Dhabi, ahead of Kubica who qualified eleventh. In the race, Petrov pitted under an early safety car period which moved him up the order when drivers ahead of him pitted. Fernando Alonso and Mark Webber both came out behind him and Petrov remained ahead of them until the end of the race, which stopped the title contenders' progress and enabled Sebastian Vettel to win the title.

==== 2011 ====
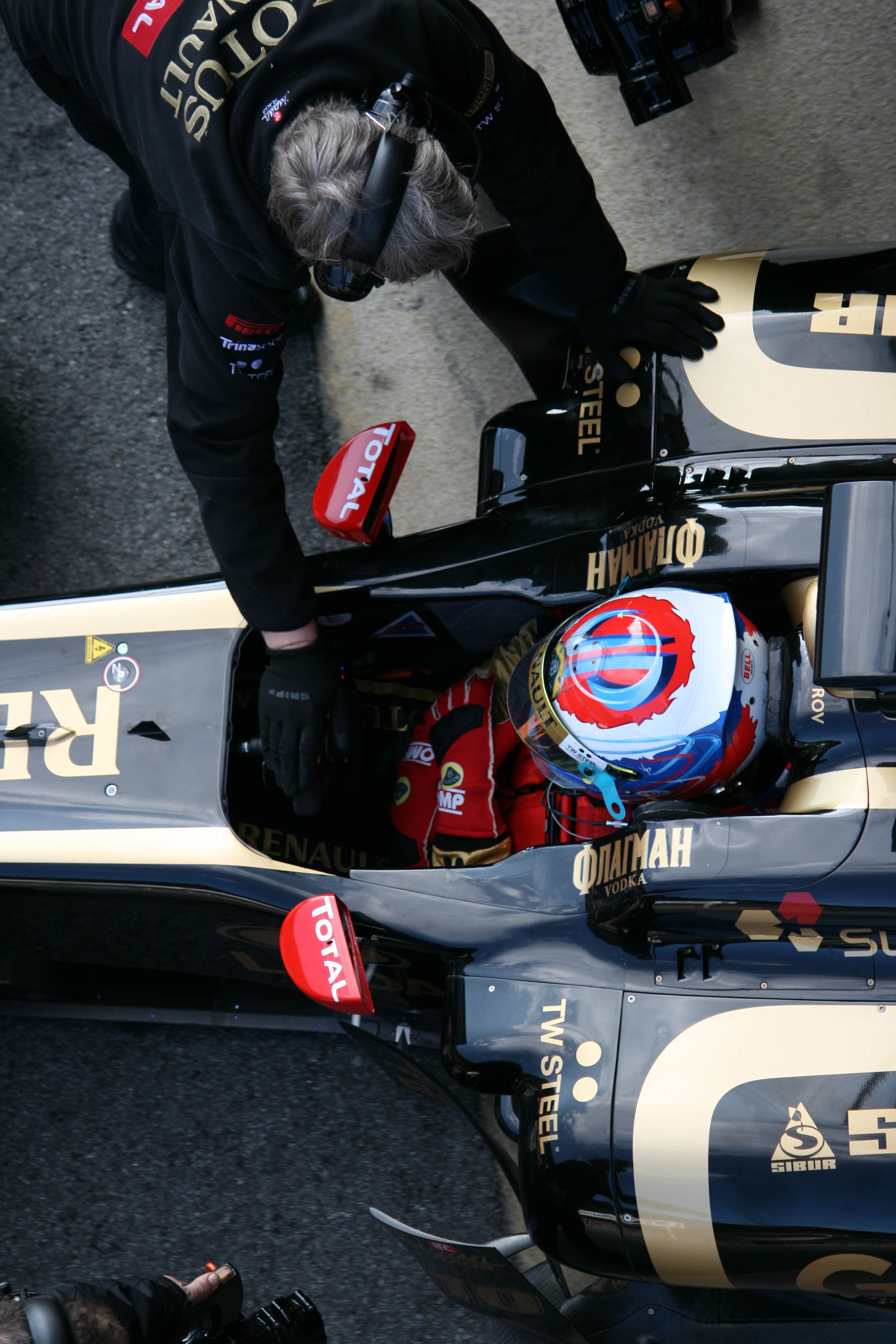
Petrov in pre-season testing at Barcelona

After the 2010 season ended, Renault team boss Éric Boullier said that there was a good chance of Petrov remaining with the team in 2011. On 22 December 2010, he was retained by the team on a two-year deal. During the close season, the team were rebranded 'Lotus Renault GP' following a sponsorship deal with Lotus Cars. Teammate Robert Kubica suffered serious injuries in a rallying accident, with Petrov being joined by Nick Heidfeld for the start of the season.

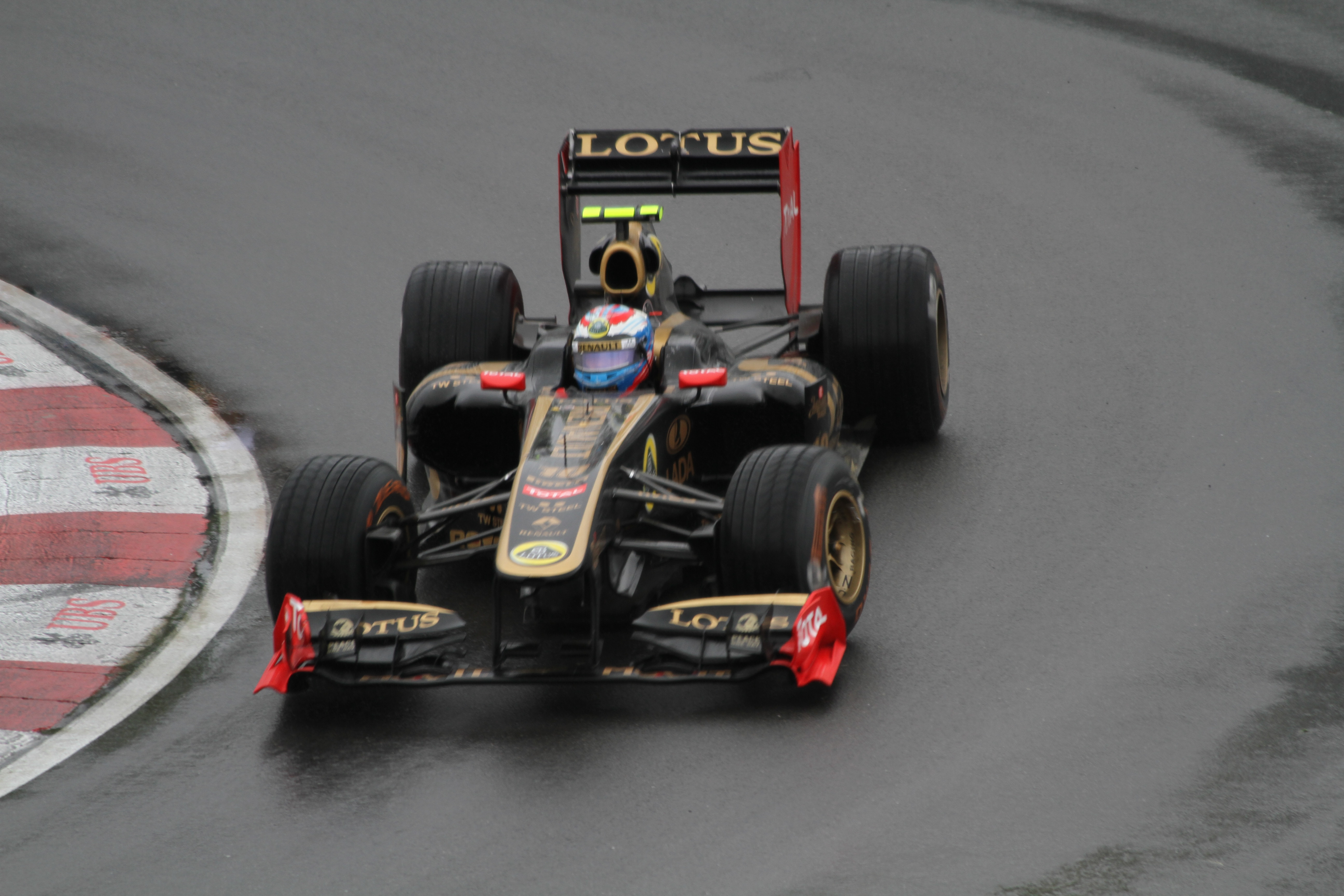
Petrov finished fifth in the wet weather race in Canada.

In the first race of the season in Australia, Petrov qualified sixth – a career-best – and secured his only Formula One podium, finishing in third place behind race-winner Sebastian Vettel and Lewis Hamilton. In Malaysia, Petrov again ran in the points until he ran wide at a corner and left the circuit; attempting to rejoin, he hit a bump caused by a drainage gully which launched his car into the air and broke the steering column on landing. During qualifying for the Chinese Grand Prix, Petrov's car suffered a technical problem after he had posted the fourth fastest time of Q2. As a result, he could not compete in Q3, leaving him to start tenth on the grid. He drove a consistent race and made good strategy calls and made his way to ninth after passing several cars after his last stop of a two stop strategy on Lap 37. An eighth place in Turkey added to his points tally before an eleventh-place finish in Spain.

In Monaco, Petrov was taken to hospital after a crash, from sixth place, involving Adrian Sutil, Lewis Hamilton and Jaime Alguersuari. The crash halted the race for 20 minutes before it eventually restarted. He was released from hospital the same day, and returned to the cockpit with a fifth-place finish in Canada. Petrov had a difficult weekend in Valencia, where he finished 15th, having started from 11th on the grid. He finished 12th at the British Grand Prix, as new restrictions on blown diffusers were introduced. In Germany, Petrov returned to Q3 for the first time since Canada before finishing ninth. A non-points finish in Hungary was followed by a ninth at the Belgian Grand Prix. Petrov qualified seventh at Monza, but while battling with Nico Rosberg on the first lap, the HRT of Vitantonio Liuzzi crashed into the side of both of them, eliminating all three cars. Renault suffered their worst performance of the season in Singapore, where Petrov qualified in 18th and finished 17th, before a ninth-place finish in Japan.

At the Korean Grand Prix, Petrov qualified eighth but retired after crashing into the back of Michael Schumacher on lap 16, causing a safety car. It became the third contact between the pair in 2011, when Petrov appeared to be too involved in trying to outbrake Alonso on the long straight before Turn 3. He incurred a five-place grid penalty for the incident at the inaugural Indian Grand Prix, which meant that he had to start the race from sixteenth place. He finished the race eleventh, just in front of teammate Bruno Senna, and just missing out on the points-scoring positions. After finishing 13th in Abu Dhabi, Petrov launched an attack on his team in an interview on Russian television, citing lack of development, strategy mistakes, and criticisms of the drivers by team management. Petrov apologised for the outburst with an email to all Renault staff, with Éric Bouiller claiming the matter was closed. Petrov ended the season with a tenth-place finish in Brazil, but with Adrian Sutil finishing sixth in the race, Sutil moved ahead of Petrov for ninth place in the final championship standings.

In December 2011, it was announced that Romain Grosjean would partner Kimi Räikkönen at the team in 2012, leaving Petrov without a drive.

=== Caterham (2012) ===
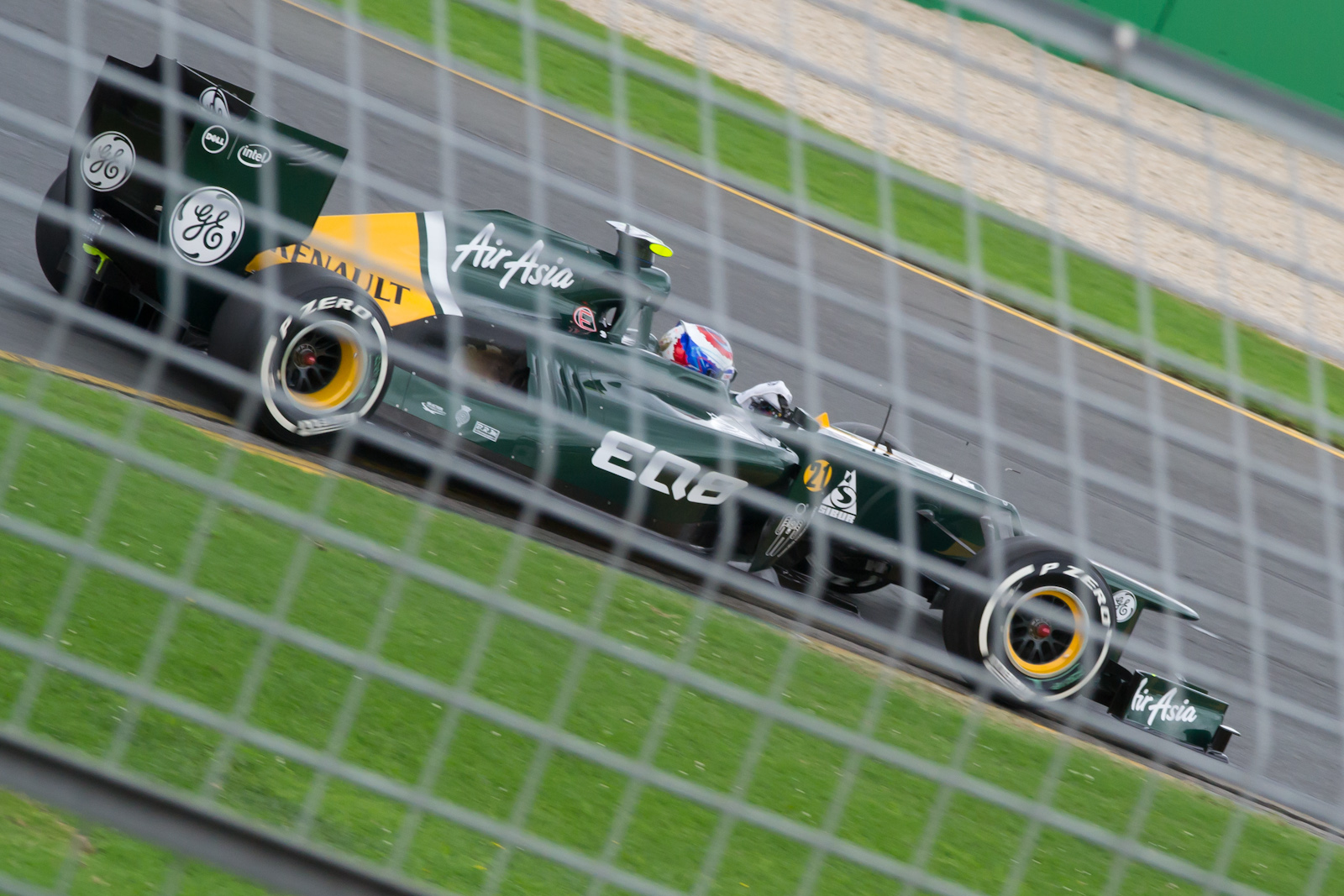
Petrov driving for Caterham at the 2012 Australian Grand Prix.

On 17 February, it was announced that Petrov would drive for the Caterham F1 Team in 2012, replacing Italian Jarno Trulli and partnering Heikki Kovalainen. Petrov qualified 20th for the Australian Grand Prix, and was running 15th when a steering problem forced him to retire on lap 36. In Malaysia, Petrov drove a clean race to finish 16th, ahead of Kovalainen. It became apparent that the Caterham lacked the pace of midfield cars, but was evidently faster than Marussia and HRT.

Petrov had another clean race at the Chinese Grand Prix where he qualified in 20th, and made his way up through the race to finish 18th, again ahead of Kovalainen who lost two laps in the pits. At the Bahrain Grand Prix, Petrov managed to qualify well over a second faster than the closest Marussia, cementing the Caterham's position as the fastest of the new teams for the third year running; he managed to finish the race in 16th place, equalling his best result in Malaysia earlier in the year.

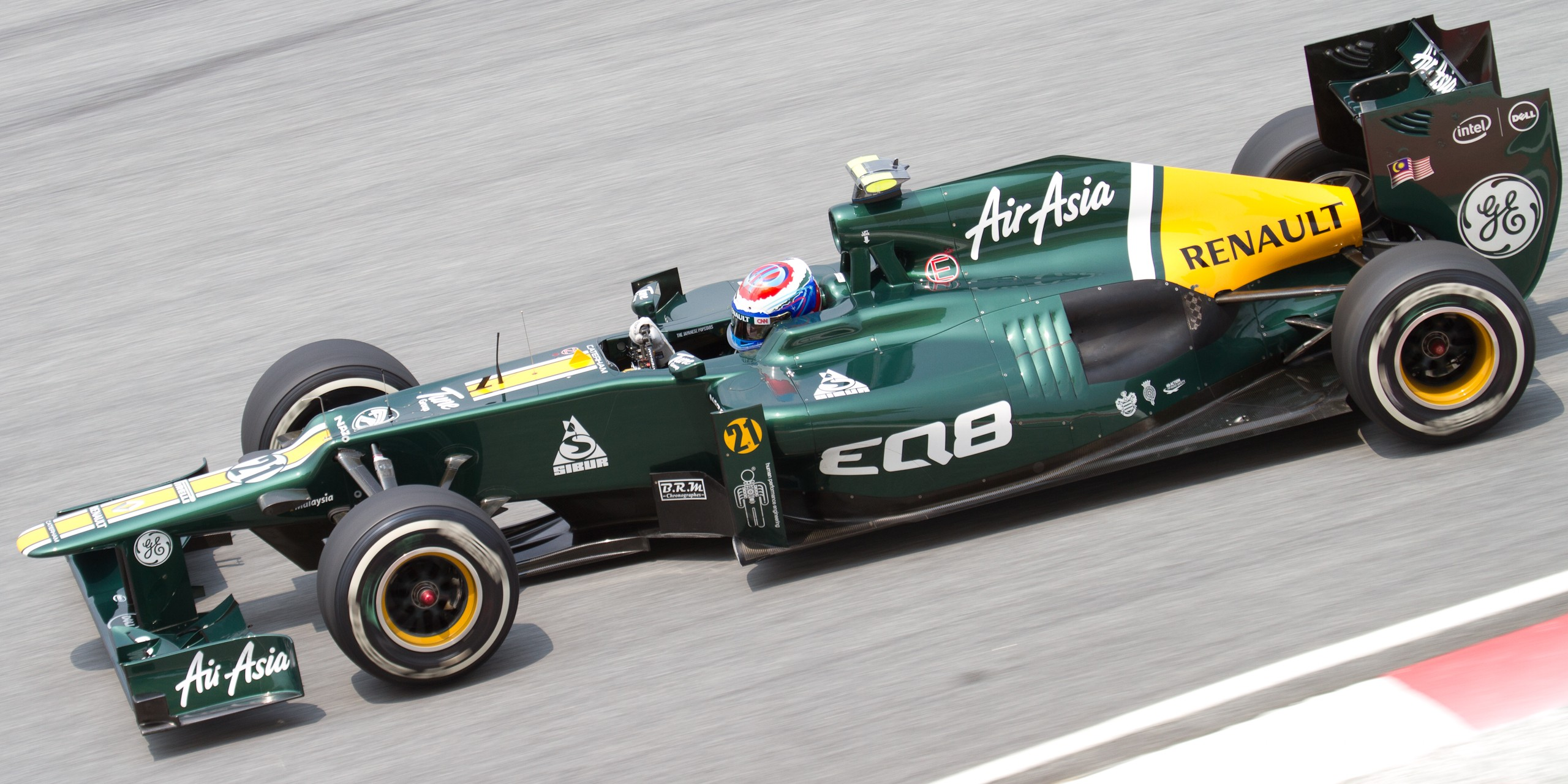
Petrov during free practice at the 2012 Malaysian Grand Prix.

The Spanish Grand Prix was the first time Petrov had qualified ahead of his teammate by just under two-tenths, however, he finished behind him for the first time in the season. The Monaco Grand Prix was a bad run for Petrov, after qualifying nearly nine-tenths down from Kovalainen, he retired from the race on lap 15 with electrical failure, giving him his second retirement of the season.

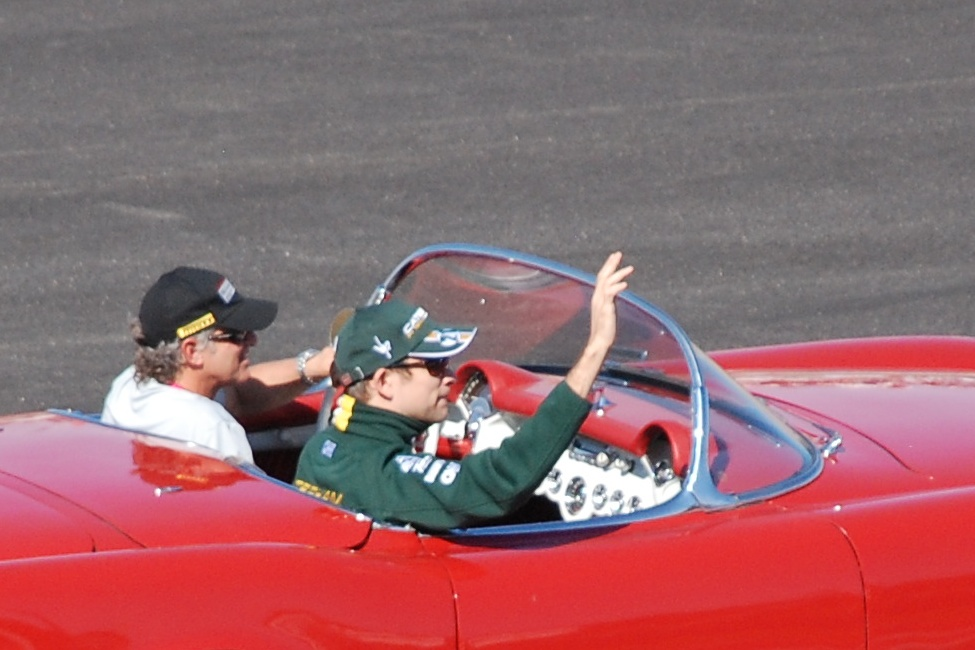
Petrov at the 2012 US Grand Prix

At the Canadian Grand Prix, Petrov managed to qualify in 19th, ahead of the Toro Rosso of Jean-Éric Vergne, but was unable to keep ahead at the start and went on to finish exactly where he started, albeit, one lap behind the leaders. After starting the race on the tenth row of the grid, Petrov ran as high as tenth at the European Grand Prix – a result that would have earned Caterham their first Formula One point – but was involved in a collision with Daniel Ricciardo and finished thirteenth.

After initially being outpaced by Kovalainen, once Petrov had adjusted to the car he began to turn the tables on his Finnish teammate. He finished ahead of Kovalainen in four of the last five races of the season.

In the final race of the season in Brazil, Petrov finished a season's best eleventh, making a crucial pass on Marussia's Charles Pic in the closing stages of the Grand Prix. The result meant Caterham moved back ahead of Marussia to claim tenth place in the Constructors' Championship, a position worth millions of pounds more in prize money.

Petrov was not retained by Caterham as the team replaced both him and Kovalainen with Charles Pic and Giedo van der Garde for the 2013 season.

== DTM ==
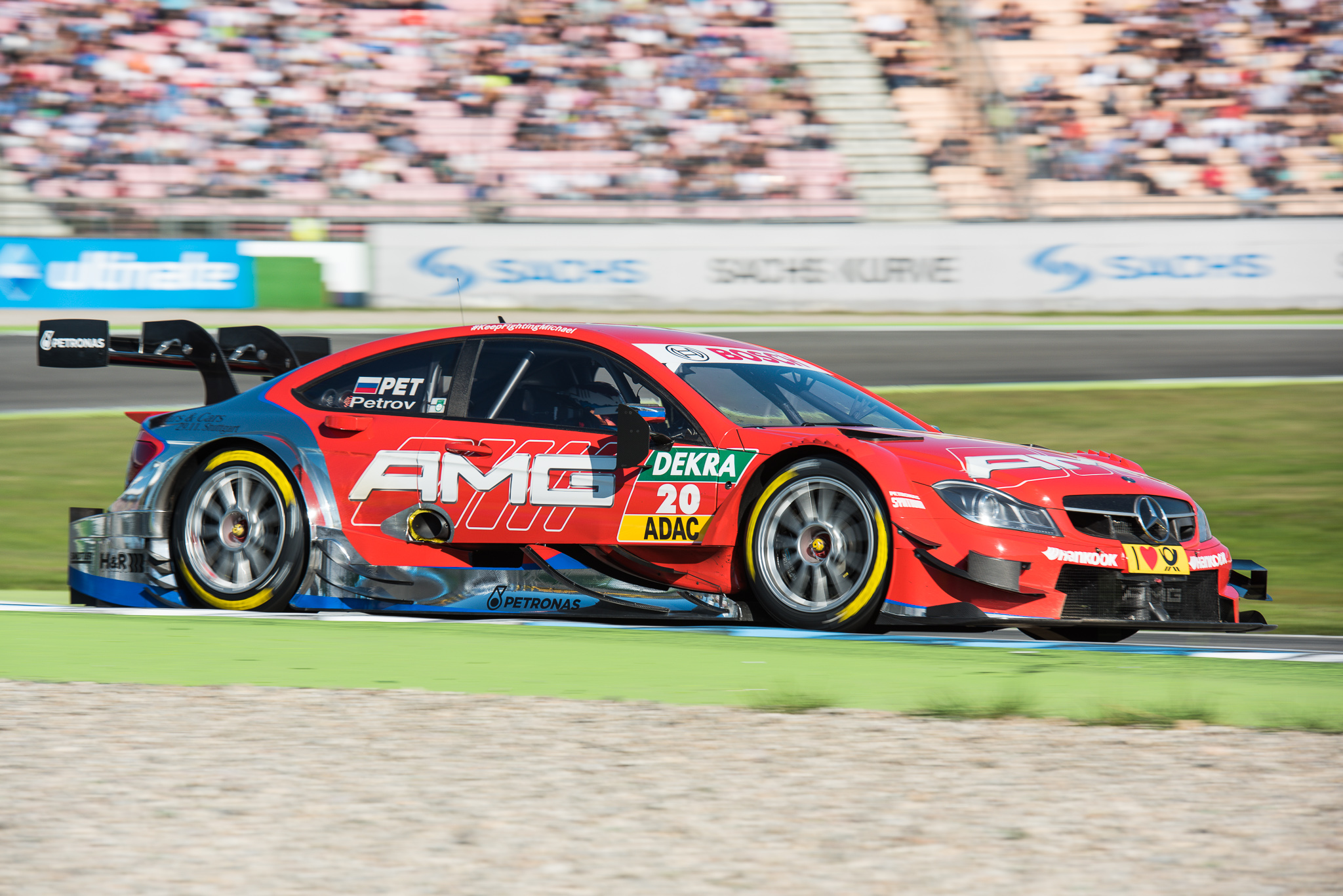
Petrov for Mücke Motorsport in Deutsche Tourenwagen Masters 2014.

Petrov signed with Mercedes to drive in the German touring car series DTM. But after a scoreless season and finishing last in the Drivers' Championship, he left the sport after one year.

== Personal life ==
In 2007, Petrov began residing in Valencia, Spain where he lived while he was a F1 driver.

Petrov is widely known in Russia as the "Vyborg Rocket". Petrov voiced a character based on himself in the Russian release of the 2011 Pixar film Cars 2.

Petrov's brother Sergei is a music composer graduated from Vienna's Conservatory. Petrov's father Aleksandr was an influential businessman and municipal deputy in his home city of Vyborg before he was assassinated in 2020 – his death requiring Petrov to stand down from his role as a temporary steward at the 2020 Portuguese Grand Prix.

== Racing record ==
=== Career summary ===
Season	Series	Team	Races	Wins	Poles	F/Laps	Podiums	Points	Position
2001	Lada Cup Russia	?	?	?	?	?	?	?	**1st**
2002	Lada Cup Russia	SK OOO Favorit	5	5	5	5	5	500	**1st**
2002	VW Polo Cup	?	1	1	?	?	1	?	?
2002	Formula RUS	10 Duimov	2	2	?	?	2	41	10th
2003	Formula Renault UK Winter Series	Eurotek Motorsport	?	1	0	0	1	44	4th
2003	Formula Renault UK	Eurotek Motorsport	2	0	0	0	0	23	28th
2003	Formula Renault 2000 Italia	Euronova Junior Team	12	0	0	0	0	12	19th
2003	Formula Renault 2000 Masters	Euronova Racing	6	0	0	0	0	0	NC
2003	Euro Formula 3000	Euronova Racing	1	0	0	0	0	0	22nd
2004	Formula Renault 2000 Italia	Euronova Junior Team	4	0	0	0	0	2	28th
2004	Formula Renault 2000 Eurocup	Euronova Junior Team	4	0	0	0	0	0	NC
2004	Euro Formula 3000	Euronova Racing	1	0	0	0	0	0	NC
2004	Lada Revolution Russia	Elex Polyus	4	1	4	?	4	43	**2nd**
2005	Russian Formula 1600	ArtLine ProTeam	6	5	1	?	9	85	**1st**
2005	Lada Revolution Russia	Maxmotor-Ulianovsk	14	10	5	6	9	?	**1st**
2006	Euroseries 3000	Euronova Racing	17	4	0	2	9	72	**3rd**
2006	GP2 Series	DPR	8	0	0	0	0	0	28th
2006	F3000 International Masters	Charouz Racing System	2	0	1	0	0	0	29th
2007	GP2 Series	Campos Grand Prix	21	1	0	0	1	21	13th
2007	Le Mans Series - LMP2	Noël del Bello Racing	1	0	0	0	0	5	13th
2007	24 Hours of Le Mans - LMP2	Noël del Bello Racing	1	0	0	0	0	N/A	DNF
2008	GP2 Series	Barwa International Campos Team	20	1	0	1	3	39	7th
2008	GP2 Asia Series	Barwa International Campos Team	10	1	1	0	4	33	**3rd**
2008–09	GP2 Asia Series	Barwa International Campos Team	11	1	0	0	3	28	5th
2009	GP2 Series	Barwa Addax Team	20	2	2	1	7	75	**2nd**
2010	Formula One	Renault F1 Team	19	0	0	1	0	27	13th
2011	Formula One	Lotus Renault GP	19	0	0	0	1	37	10th
2012	Formula One	Caterham F1 Team	20	0	0	0	0	0	19th
2014	Deutsche Tourenwagen Masters	Mücke Motorsport	10	0	0	0	0	0	23rd
2016	FIA World Endurance Championship - LMP2	SMP Racing	9	0	0	0	1	63	9th
2016	24 Hours of Le Mans - LMP2	SMP Racing	1	0	0	0	1	N/A	**3rd**
2016	European Le Mans Series	SMP Racing	2	0	0	0	1	23	15th
2017	FIA World Endurance Championship - LMP2	CEFC Manor TRS Racing	9	0	0	0	0	46	18th
2017	24 Hours of Le Mans - LMP2	CEFC Manor TRS Racing	1	0	0	0	0	N/A	DNF
2018	Blancpain GT Series Endurance Cup	SMP Racing by AKKA ASP	4	0	0	0	0	6	41st
2018	24 Hours of Le Mans	SMP Racing	1	0	0	0	0	N/A	DNF
2018–19	FIA World Endurance Championship	SMP Racing	8	0	0	0	4	94	4th
2019	24 Hours of Le Mans	SMP Racing	1	0	0	0	1	N/A	**3rd**
2023–24	Middle East Trophy - 992	SMP Racing	1	0	1	0	0	0	NC†
2025	Middle East Trophy - GT3	SMP Racing	2	0	0	0	0	25	5th

=== Complete Formula Renault 2.0 Italia results ===
(key) (Races in bold indicate pole position) (Races in italics indicate fastest lap)

Year	Entrant	1	2	3	4	5	6	7	8	9	10	11	12	13	14	15	16	17	DC	Points
2003	Euronova Junior Team	VLL; 27	VLL; 25	MGI; 16	SPA; 16	SPA; 18	A1R; 17	A1R; 20	MIS; 15	MIS; 14	VAR; 18	ADR; Ret	MNZ; 5						19th	12
2004	Euronova Junior Team	VLL; 1; 29	VLL; 2; 25	VAR; 10	MGI; Ret	SPA; 1	SPA; 2	MNZ; 1	MNZ; 2	MNZ; 3	MIS; 1	MIS; 2	MIS; 3	ADR	HOC; 1	HOC; 2	MNZ; 1	MNZ; 2	28th	2

=== Complete Formula Renault 2.0 Eurocup results ===
(key) (Races in bold indicate pole position) (Races in italics indicate fastest lap)

Year	Entrant	1	2	3	4	5	6	7	8	9	10	11	12	13	14	15	16	17	DC	Points
2003	Euronova Junior Team	BRN; 1; 29	BRN; 2 Ret	ASS; 1 DNQ	ASS; 2 DNQ	OSC; 1 Ret	OSC; 2; 31	DON; 1 Ret	DON; 2; 19										42nd	0
2004	Euronova Junior Team	MNZ; 1; 15	MNZ; 2; 11	VAL; 1	VAL; 2	MAG; 1	MAG; 2	HOC; 1; 25	HOC; 2; 23	BRN; 1	BRN; 2	DON; 1	DON; 2	SPA	IMO; 1	IMO; 2	OSC; 1	OSC; 2	31st	0

=== Complete Euro F3000/Euroseries 3000 results ===
(key) (Races in bold indicate pole position) (Races in italics indicate fastest lap)

Year	Entrant	1	2	3	4	5	6	7	8	9	10	11	12	13	14	15	16	17	18	DC	Points
2003	Euronova Racing	NÜR	MAG	PER	MNZ	SPA	DON	BRN	JER	CAG; 10										22nd	0
2004	Euronova Racing	BRN	EST	JER	MNZ	SPA	DON; Ret	DIJ	ZOL	NÜR1	NÜR2									NC	0
2006	Euronova Racing	ADR; 1; 6	ADR; 2; 11	IMO; 1 DNS	IMO; 2; 3	SPA; 1; 9	SPA; 2; 4	HUN; 1; 7	HUN; 2; 1	MUG; 1; 7	MUG; 2; 1	SIL; 1; 1	SIL; 2 Ret	CAT; 1; 3	CAT; 2; 1	VLL; 1; 4	VLL; 2; 2	MIS; 1; 2	MIS; 2; 3	3rd	72

=== Complete F3000 International Masters results ===
(key) (Races in bold indicate pole position) (Races in italics indicate fastest lap)

Year	Entrant	1	2	3	4	5	6	7	8	9	10	11	12	13	14	15	16	DC	Points
2006	Charouz Racing System	MNZ; 1	MNZ; 2	MAG; 1	MAG; 2	BRH; 1	BRH; 2	OSC; 1	OSC; 2	**BRN**; **1** Ret	BRN; 2; 12	IST; 1	IST; 2	EST; 1	EST; 2	EST; 3	EST; 4	29th	0

=== Complete GP2 Series results ===
(key) (Races in bold indicate pole position) (Races in italics indicate fastest lap)

Year	Entrant	1	2	3	4	5	6	7	8	9	10	11	12	13	14	15	16	17	18	19	20	21	DC	Points
2006	DPR	VAL; FEA	VAL; SPR	IMO; FEA	IMO; SPR	NÜR; FEA	NÜR; SPR	CAT; FEA	CAT; SPR	MON; FEA	SIL; FEA	SIL; SPR	MAG; FEA	MAG; SPR	HOC; FEA; 15	HOC; SPR; 15	HUN; FEA; 15	HUN; SPR; 10	IST; FEA; 16	IST; SPR; 18	MNZ; FEA; Ret	MNZ; SPR; 12	28th	0
2007	Campos Grand Prix	BHR; FEA; 14	BHR; SPR; 11	CAT; FEA; 10	CAT; SPR; 16^{†}	MON; FEA; 6	MAG; FEA; 5	MAG; SPR; 5	SIL; FEA; 9	SIL; SPR; 9	NÜR; FEA; 11	NÜR; SPR; 17	HUN; FEA; Ret	HUN; SPR; 9	IST; FEA; 17	IST; SPR; 5	MNZ; FEA; 12	MNZ; SPR; 12	SPA; FEA; 9	SPA; SPR; 11	VAL; FEA; 1	VAL; SPR; 8	13th	21
2008	Barwa International Campos Team	CAT; FEA; 6	CAT; SPR; Ret	IST; FEA; 5	IST; SPR; 2	MON; FEA; Ret	MON; SPR; 15	MAG; FEA; 4	MAG; SPR; 18^{†}	SIL; FEA; 10	SIL; SPR; 5	HOC; FEA; Ret	HOC; SPR; 12	HUN; FEA; Ret	HUN; SPR; 9	VAL; FEA; 1	VAL; SPR; 15^{†}	SPA; FEA; 4	SPA; SPR; 3	MNZ; FEA; Ret	MNZ; SPR; Ret		7th	39
2009	Barwa Addax Team	CAT; FEA; 2	CAT; SPR; 9	MON; FEA; 2	MON; SPR; 6	IST; FEA; 1	IST; SPR; 3	SIL; FEA; 15	SIL; SPR; 10	NÜR; FEA; 4	NÜR; SPR; 4	HUN; FEA; Ret	HUN; SPR; 12	VAL; FEA; 1	VAL; SPR; 3	SPA; FEA; Ret	SPA; SPR; 6	**MNZ**; **FEA**; 2	MNZ; SPR; 5	**ALG**; **FEA**; 4	ALG; SPR; Ret		2nd	75

==== Complete GP2 Asia Series results ====
(key) (Races in bold indicate pole position) (Races in italics indicate fastest lap)

Year	Entrant	1	2	3	4	5	6	7	8	9	10	11	12	DC	Points
2008	Barwa International Campos Team	DUB; FEA; DNS	DUB; SPR; 9	**SEN**; **FEA**; 5	SEN; SPR; 3	SEP; FEA; 1	SEP; SPR; 3	BHR; FEA; 10	BHR; SPR; 3	DUB; FEA; 4	DUB; SPR; Ret			**3rd**	**33**
2008–09	Barwa International Campos Team	SHI; FEA; 5	SHI; SPR; Ret	DUB; FEA; 5	DUB; SPR; C	BHR; FEA; 10	BHR; SPR; 12	LSL; FEA; 3	LSL; SPR; 2	SEP; FEA; 6	SEP; SPR; 1	BHR; FEA; 19	BHR; SPR; 11	5th	28

=== Complete 24 Hours of Le Mans results ===
Year	Team	Co-Drivers	Car	Class	Laps	Pos.	Class Pos.
2007	(France) Noël del Bello Racing	(France) Romain Ianetta (United States) Liz Halliday	Courage LC75-AER	LMP2	198	DNF	DNF
2016	(Russia) SMP Racing	(Russia) Kirill Ladygin (Russia) Viktor Shaytar	BR Engineering BR01-Nissan	LMP2	353	7th	**3rd**
2017	(China) CEFC Manor TRS Racing	(Mexico) Roberto González (Switzerland) Simon Trummer	Oreca 07-Gibson	LMP2	152	DNF	DNF
2018	(Russia) SMP Racing	(Russia) Mikhail Aleshin (United Kingdom) Jenson Button	BR Engineering BR1-AER	LMP1	315	DNF	DNF
2019	(Russia) SMP Racing	(Russia) Mikhail Aleshin (Belgium) Stoffel Vandoorne	BR Engineering BR1-AER	LMP1	379	**3rd**	**3rd**

=== Complete Formula One results ===
(key) (Races in bold indicate pole position) (Races in italics indicate fastest lap)

Year	Entrant	Chassis	Engine	1	2	3	4	5	6	7	8	9	10	11	12	13	14	15	16	17	18	19	20	WDC	Points
2010	Renault F1 Team	Renault R30	Renault RS27-2010 2.4 V8	BHR; Ret	AUS; Ret	MAL; Ret	CHN; 7	ESP; 11	MON; 13^{†}	TUR; 15	CAN; 17	EUR; 14	GBR; 13	GER; 10	HUN; 5	BEL; 9	ITA; 13	SIN; 11	JPN; Ret	KOR; Ret	BRA; 16	ABU; 6		13th	27
2011	Lotus Renault GP	Renault R31	Renault RS27-2011 2.4 V8	AUS; 3	MAL; 17^{†}	CHN; 9	TUR; 8	ESP; 11	MON; Ret	CAN; 5	EUR; 15	GBR; 12	GER; 10	HUN; 12	BEL; 9	ITA; Ret	SIN; 17	JPN; 9	KOR; Ret	IND; 11	ABU; 13	BRA; 10		10th	37
2012	Caterham F1 Team	Caterham CT01	Renault RS27-2012 2.4 V8	AUS; Ret	MAL; 16	CHN; 18	BHR; 16	ESP; 17	MON; Ret	CAN; 19	EUR; 13	GBR; DNS	GER; 16	HUN; 19	BEL; 14	ITA; 15	SIN; 19	JPN; 17	KOR; 16	IND; 17	ABU; 16	USA; 17	BRA; 11	19th	0

^{†} Did not finish, but was classified as he had completed more than 90% of the race distance.

=== Complete Deutsche Tourenwagen Masters results ===
(key) (Races in bold indicate pole position) (Races in italics indicate fastest lap)

Year	Team	Car	1	2	3	4	5	6	7	8	9	10	Pos.	Pts
2014	Mücke Motorsport	Mercedes-AMG C63 Coupé	HOC; 17	OSC; 17	HUN; 17	NOR; 19	MSC; 18	SPL; 20	NÜR; 18	LAU; 12	ZAN; 11	HOC; 18†	23rd	0

^{†} Driver did not finish, but was classified as he had completed 75% of the race distance.

=== Complete FIA World Endurance Championship results ===
(key) (Races in bold indicate pole position) (Races in italics indicate fastest lap)

Year	Entrant	Class	Car	Engine	1	2	3	4	5	6	7	8	9	Rank	Points
2016	SMP Racing	LMP2	BR Engineering BR01	Nissan VK45DE 4.5 L V8	SIL; 8	SPA; 9	LMS; 3	NÜR; 6	MEX; Ret	COA; 6	FUJ; 10	SHA; 7	BHR; 8	9th	63
2017	CEFC Manor TRS Racing	LMP2	Oreca 07	Gibson GK428 4.2 L V8	SIL; 7	SPA; 8	LMS; Ret	NÜR; 7	MEX; 8	COA; Ret	FUJ; 7	SHA; 5	BHR; 5	18th	46
2018–19	SMP Racing	LMP1	BR Engineering BR1	AER P60B 2.4 L Turbo V6	SPA; 5	LMS; Ret	SIL; Ret	FUJ; 4	SHA; 3	SEB; 3	SPA; 3	LMS; 3		4th	94

=== Complete European Le Mans Series results ===
Year	Entrant	Class	Chassis	Engine	1	2	3	4	5	6	Rank	Points
2016	SMP Racing	LMP2	BR Engineering BR01	Nissan VK45DE 4.5 L V8	SIL	IMO	RBR	LEC	SPA; 6	EST; 3	15th	23
