= 2011 Hungarian Grand Prix =

Race 11 of 19 in the 2011 Formula One World Championship
| ← Previous race | Next race → |
- The Hungaroring

Race details
- Date: July 31, 2011
- Official name: Formula 1 Eni Magyar Nagydíj 2011
- Location: Hungaroring, Mogyoród, Hungary
- Course: Permanent racing facility
- Course length: 4.381 km (2.722 miles)
- Distance: 70 laps, 306.630 km (190.531 miles)
- Weather: Cloudy, rain showers

Pole position
| Driver | (Germany) Sebastian Vettel | Red Bull Racing-Renault |
- Time: 1:19.815

Fastest lap
| Driver | (Brazil) Felipe Massa | Ferrari |
- Time: 1:23.415 on lap 61

Podium
| First | (United Kingdom) Jenson Button | McLaren-Mercedes |
| Second | (Germany) Sebastian Vettel | Red Bull Racing-Renault |
| Third | (Spain) Fernando Alonso | Ferrari |

The 2011 Hungarian Grand Prix (formally the Formula 1 Eni Magyar Nagydíj 2011) was a Formula One motor race that was held on 31 July 2011 at the Hungaroring in Mogyoród, near Budapest, Hungary It was the eleventh round of the 2011 Formula One season, and the 27th running of the Hungarian Grand Prix, and the 26th time it had been held as a round of the World Championship. The 70-lap race was won by McLaren's Jenson Button, in his 200th Grand Prix start, after starting from third on the grid. Championship leader Sebastian Vettel, who started the race from pole position, finished in second place for Red Bull Racing, and Fernando Alonso completed the podium in third position for Ferrari.

As a consequence of the race, Vettel extended his lead in the World Drivers' Championship to 85 points over Mark Webber, who finished the race in fifth position. Lewis Hamilton, fourth in the race, remained in third place in the championship, 3 points behind Webber in third, and one ahead of Alonso. In the World Constructors' Championship, Red Bull's championship lead was cut to 103 points over McLaren, with Ferrari a further 65 points behind in third position. This was the last race for Nick Heidfeld.

== Report ==
=== Background ===
After being replaced by Karun Chandhok in Germany, Team Lotus driver Jarno Trulli returned to his seat alongside Heikki Kovalainen. Bruno Senna also made his first appearance in a car at a Grand Prix this season, replacing Nick Heidfeld in the first free practice season for Renault. Renault team principal Éric Boullier stated that the team were assessing their testing and reserve drivers – in particular Senna and GP2 championship leader Romain Grosjean – as potential replacements for Heidfeld.

Tyre supplier Pirelli brought its yellow-banded soft compound tyre as the harder "prime" tyre and the red-banded super-soft compound as the softer "option" compound, as opposed to the previous year where Bridgestone brought the white-banded medium compound as the prime.

Sébastien Buemi received a five-place grid penalty for causing an avoidable accident with Nick Heidfeld at the Nürburgring.

This race was Jenson Button's 200th Grand Prix; and also the 100th Grand Prix of the 2.4 litre V8 engine since it became mandatory in F1 in 2006. It was the 100th Grand Prix for Nico Rosberg and also for the Toro Rosso team.

Heading into the weekend, Sebastian Vettel led the World Championship with 216 points, 77 more than teammate Mark Webber - his lead had dropped after Germany for only the second time this season, but only by 3 points. After his victory the previous week in Germany, Lewis Hamilton had become the only driver other than Vettel to win multiple Grands Prix thus far in 2011; he was on 134 points, 5 behind Webber, yet 4 ahead of Fernando Alonso. Jenson Button had dropped to fifth in the standings after two retirements in the last two Grands Prix, on 109 points.

Red Bull Racing still seemed dominant in the Constructors' table, despite scoring their season's fewest points the previous week in Germany, and led on 355 points. McLaren looked set to continue their good form and pace this weekend, although were 112 points behind Red Bull on 243. Alonso had scored the most points of any driver in the last three Grands Prix, and had put Ferrari a clear third on 192 points. Mercedes and Renault were both over 100 points behind Ferrari on 78 and 66 respectively in fourth and fifth places. Williams, Team Lotus, HRT and Virgin Racing had all mathematically dropped out of title contention at the last race - although, none realistically had any chance of winning.

=== Practice ===
In practice 1, Lewis Hamilton topped the leaderboard with a time of 1:23.350 following on from his win at the Nürburgring the weekend before, Sebastian Vettel came second with a time of 1:23.564 and Fernando Alonso third with a time of 1:23.642.

In second practice, Hamilton once again clocked the best time of 1:21.018, Alonso improved on his previous lap with a 1:21.259, and Jenson Button was third fastest in 1:21.322. Both Mark Webber and Vettel failed to impress in second practice provoking Red Bull Racing to break the curfew on working hours in order to make drastic changes to the car.

This extra time spent working on the cars worked for Vettel because he then topped the leaderboard with a lap of 1:21.168, Alonso's fastest lap was 1:21.468 and Button clocked a lap off 1:21.639, Lewis Hamilton who topped the timings in the first two practices could only manage a 1:22.667, the seventh fastest time.

=== Qualifying ===
Q1 saw the three newest teams fall out again – the two closely matched HRTs of Vitantonio Liuzzi and then Daniel Ricciardo sandwiched by the Virgin cars of Jérôme d'Ambrosio and Glock. Jarno Trulli returned to his Lotus car and praised the new power steering system, despite being out-qualified by teammate Heikki Kovalainen. Sébastien Buemi was the only man to qualify on the softer compound tyres and ended up in 18th on track, but would start 23rd due to his five-place grid penalty. Buemi decided to not use any of his three sets of super-soft tyres in qualifying to save them for the race.

In the second qualifying session, every driver set a lap on the option tyres except two. Lewis Hamilton still managed to take his McLaren into Q3 with the sixth fastest Q2 time on the prime tyres, and Pastor Maldonado, who did not set a timed lap. It was notable that Red Bull Racing and Ferrari needed to use options when Hamilton could use primes. Jaime Alguersuari – a man who had come from far back to score points a few times in 2011, like his teammate did at this weekend set the slowest Q2 time and dropped out on the same row as Rubens Barrichello's Williams. Neither Renault made the top 10, Vitaly Petrov in 12th and Nick Heidfeld in 14th. One Force India and one Sauber failed to make the cut – Kamui Kobayashi (13th) joined Heidfeld on row 7, and similarly Paul di Resta just missed out with 11th.

Sergio Pérez opted not to go out in the third part of qualifying, to save tyres and started tenth, alongside the Mercedes of Michael Schumacher, who was again beaten by teammate Nico Rosberg, who qualified seventh. Adrian Sutil continued his improved form to start eighth. Only the 3 big teams chose to do two timed runs and they occupied the top six places. Lewis Hamilton had a good lap, breaking the 1 minute, 20 seconds barrier for the first time that weekend. After they had all done their first stint, Hamilton was fastest with reigning world champion and championship leader Sebastian Vettel only slightly slower. Vettel improved his lap time on his second run, and took his eighth pole of the season. Hamilton joined him on the front row, ahead of Button, Massa, Alonso and Webber.

=== Race ===
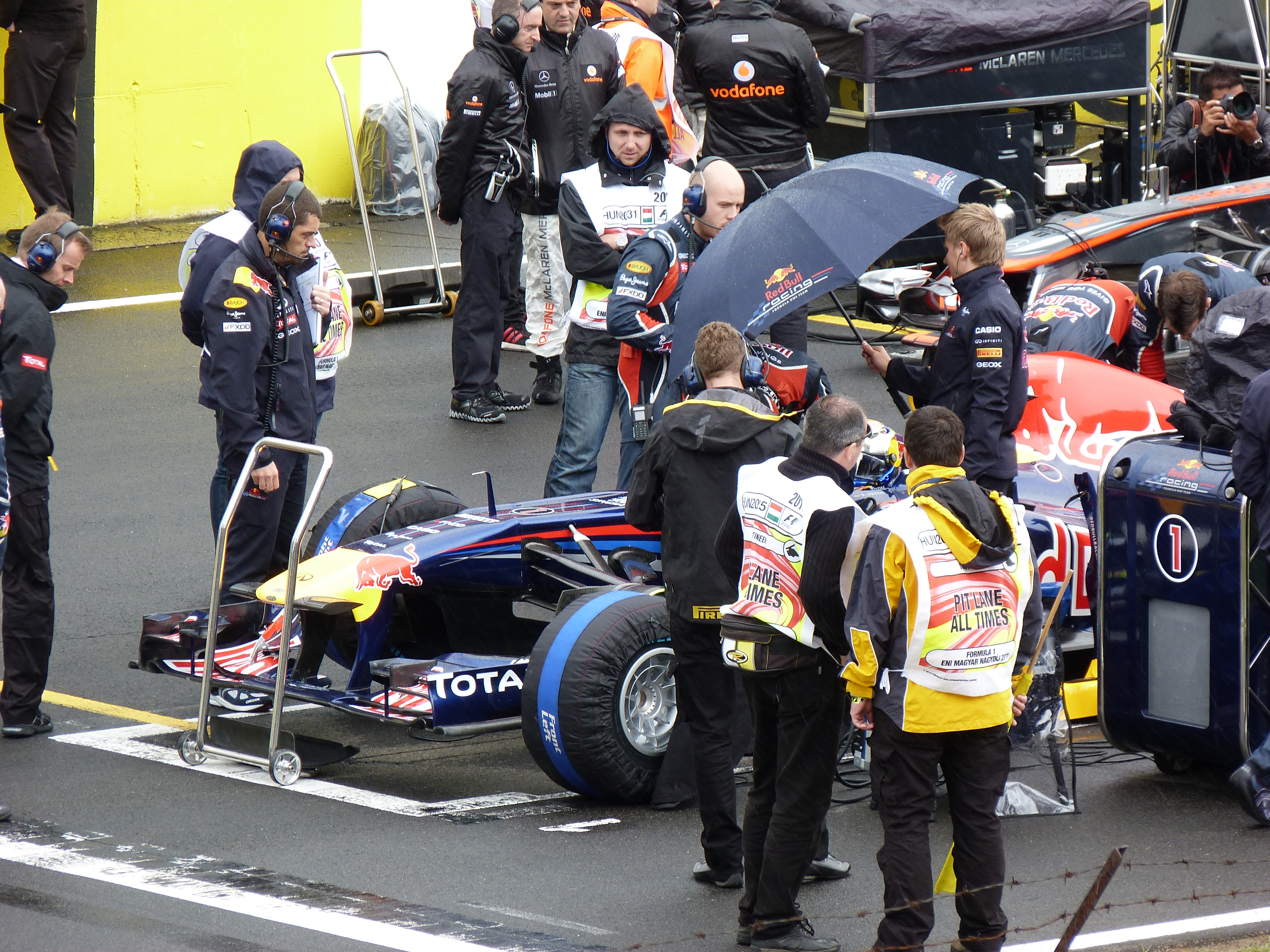
The race started under wet conditions with all the drivers starting on intermediate tyres

After mixed conditions wreaked havoc in the support races, the Grand Prix started with a wet surface. At the start of the race, the track was described as, "not very wet, but slippery" by Jenson Button; this meant that it would be much more difficult to get heat into the tyres at the start of the race. This also provided dilemmas for the team's engineers, as the conditions were not wet enough to use the full wet tyres, which would disintegrate very quickly if used, while the dry tyres were presumed to not give enough grip. This meant that all of the drivers started on intermediates.

Vettel easily established a lead into the first corner, with Lewis Hamilton following in second after spending the first two corners successfully defending from Button in third. The Ferraris and Mark Webber struggled to get off the line on a damp track, the Mercedes cars of Rosberg and Michael Schumacher were fourth and fifth. Alonso and Webber dropped down to sixth and seventh, with Felipe Massa down in eighth followed by Paul di Resta and Kamui Kobayashi.

Massa took seventh from Webber early on the first lap, while Michael Schumacher and Fernando Alonso battled throughout the rest of the lap for fifth, culminating with Alonso passing Schumacher at the last corner. The Ferraris continued their recovery, as Alonso quickly dealt with Rosberg and closed in on Button, but he ran wide at Turn 3, allowing Rosberg to reclaim the position. Massa passed Schumacher, with Webber also following him through. Lewis Hamilton made repeated attempts to pass Vettel around Turns 1 and 2. The World Champion was able to hold him off until the fifth lap when he made a mistake and went wide at Turn 3, handing the lead to Hamilton, and allowing Jenson Button to catch up. Hamilton, now on a clear track was released and started to pull away from the rest of the field and was 5.5 seconds clear after ten laps. Alonso had by then taken fourth from Rosberg again, whereas his teammate Massa spun off on the slippery conditions, rejoining down in 9th. Jarno Trulli become the first retirement with a water leak.

As the track began to dry out, Webber was the first to pit for slick tyres and immediately set quick sector times. Button changed to slicks a lap later, but the leading duo of Hamilton and Vettel as well as Alonso stayed out a lap longer. Hamilton was unaffected due to the lead he had built, but Vettel and Alonso conceded places to Button and Webber who were able to pass them before they had fully heated up their slick tyres. After the entire field had pitted for slicks, the order at the front was Hamilton leading Button, followed by the Red Bulls of Vettel and Webber with Alonso, Rosberg, di Resta, Schumacher, Massa and Kamui Kobayashi completing the top ten.

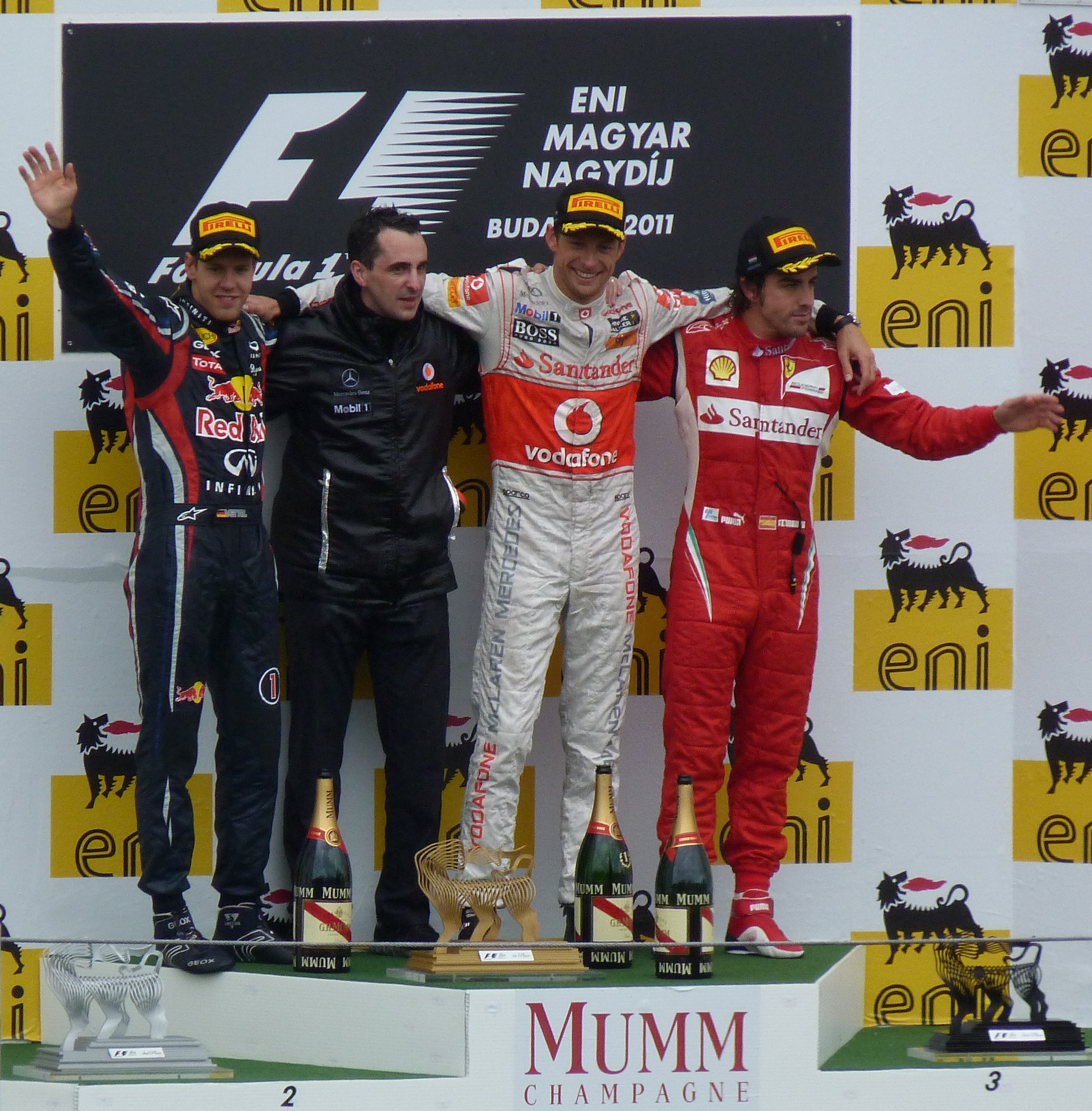
Jenson Button won on his 200th GP start, at the scene of his maiden victory in 2006, ahead of the championship leader Sebastian Vettel and Fernando Alonso; Button's race engineer, Dave Robson, standing between Button and Vettel, collected the Constructors' Trophy.

Hamilton continued to extend his lead, building up a 9-second gap to Button by lap 20 while Button seemed to be preoccupied in holding back Vettel. However, then Button steadily began to close in on Hamilton whilst simultaneously pulling away from Vettel. Hamilton went to the pits for a new set of tyres, and was still comfortably ahead after Button and Vettel had made their respective stops. While Webber and Alonso fought for fourth, Michael Schumacher and Felipe Massa battled for eighth until Schumacher retired with a gearbox problem.

Alonso made an extremely early third pitstop for a new set of super-softs in the hopes of emerging onto a clear circuit in an attempt to undercut Webber, but Webber responded by staying out longer and opting for the soft tyres during his stop. Even though this dropped him behind Alonso, it ensured that if the race stayed dry, he would not need to pit again, unlike Alonso. Button and Vettel also chose soft tyres, but Hamilton followed Alonso's suit and ran on the super-softs which meant that he, too, would need a further stop to make it to the finish. The race was interrupted by a brief shower a few laps later, making the circuit slippery again. Hamilton spun at Turn 8, forcing Paul di Resta off the circuit and allowing Button to catch up. Hamilton and Button traded places several times, with the leader being given the first choice for pit strategy. Hamilton prevailed, and elected to return to the intermediate tyre compound. However, the circuit started to dry out again within two laps, forcing Hamilton to make another stop for dry tyres. He was also given a drive-through penalty for forcing Paul di Resta off the circuit. Elsewhere, Heikki Kovalainen become the fourth and final retirement for the same reason as his teammate, giving Lotus Racing another double failure to finish.

This left Button leading from Vettel, as neither had pitted for the intermediates, while Hamilton dropped down to sixth behind Felipe Massa and Webber. Hamilton moved up to fifth when Massa made his final scheduled stop. Hamilton and Webber fought for fourth place, and as the two passed a massively congested midfield pack, Webber got stuck behind one of the backmarkers, allowing Hamilton the opportunity he needed to take fourth. Over half a minute in front of them, Alonso started closing in on Vettel at a rate that meant second place was a possibility by the end of the race, but then suffered another spin and he was forced to settle for third.

Jenson Button went on to win the race, his 200th Grand Prix start and the scene of his maiden victory ahead of Vettel in second and Alonso. Hamilton was fourth from Webber, whilst Massa – who had out-qualified Alonso for the first time since the 2010 Belgian Grand Prix – was the final car classified on the lead lap in sixth place. It was the fifth race in a row the driver who started in eighteenth place had gone on to score points when Buemi finished eighth. Di Resta triumphed over a midfield battle for seventh, with Rosberg dropping down to ninth behind Sébastien Buemi, whose teammate Jaime Alguersuari took the final point, whereas Kamui Kobayashi's tyre-saving strategy failed to work and left him outside the points.

The race set a record for the highest number of pit stops performed in a single race at 88.

== Classification ==
=== Qualifying ===
| Pos | No | Driver | Constructor | Part 1 | Part 2 | Part 3 | Grid |
|---|---|---|---|---|---|---|---|
| 1 | 1 | (Germany) Sebastian Vettel | Red Bull Racing-Renault | 1:21.740 | 1:21.095 | 1:19.815 | 1 |
| 2 | 3 | (United Kingdom) Lewis Hamilton | McLaren-Mercedes | 1:21.636 | 1:21.105 | 1:19.978 | 2 |
| 3 | 4 | (United Kingdom) Jenson Button | McLaren-Mercedes | 1:22.038 | 1:20.578 | 1:20.024 | 3 |
| 4 | 6 | (Brazil) Felipe Massa | Ferrari | 1:22.130 | 1:21.099 | 1:20.350 | 4 |
| 5 | 5 | (Spain) Fernando Alonso | Ferrari | 1:21.578 | 1:20.262 | 1:20.365 | 5 |
| 6 | 2 | (Australia) Mark Webber | Red Bull Racing-Renault | 1:22.208 | 1:20.890 | 1:20.474 | 6 |
| 7 | 8 | (Germany) Nico Rosberg | Mercedes | 1:22.996 | 1:21.243 | 1:21.098 | 7 |
| 8 | 14 | (Germany) Adrian Sutil | Force India-Mercedes | 1:22.237 | 1:22.000 | 1:21.445 | 8 |
| 9 | 7 | (Germany) Michael Schumacher | Mercedes | 1:22.876 | 1:21.852 | 1:21.907 | 9 |
| 10 | 17 | (Mexico) Sergio Pérez | Sauber-Ferrari | 1:23.067 | 1:22.157 | no time | 10 |
| 11 | 15 | (United Kingdom) Paul di Resta | Force India-Mercedes | 1:22.976 | 1:22.256 | | 11 |
| 12 | 10 | (Russia) Vitaly Petrov | Renault | 1:23.070 | 1:22.284 | | 12 |
| 13 | 16 | (Japan) Kamui Kobayashi | Sauber-Ferrari | 1:23.278 | 1:22.435 | | 13 |
| 14 | 9 | (Germany) Nick Heidfeld | Renault | 1:23.024 | 1:22.470 | | 14 |
| 15 | 11 | (Brazil) Rubens Barrichello | Williams-Cosworth | 1:23.075 | 1:22.684 | | 15 |
| 16 | 19 | (Spain) Jaime Alguersuari | Toro Rosso-Ferrari | 1:23.285 | 1:22.979 | | 16 |
| 17 | 12 | (Venezuela) Pastor Maldonado | Williams-Cosworth | 1:23.847 | no time | | 17 |
| 18 | 18 | (Switzerland) Sébastien Buemi | Toro Rosso-Ferrari | 1:24.070 | | | 23^{1} |
| 19 | 20 | (Finland) Heikki Kovalainen | Lotus-Renault | 1:24.362 | | | 18 |
| 20 | 21 | (Italy) Jarno Trulli | Lotus-Renault | 1:24.534 | | | 19 |
| 21 | 24 | (Germany) Timo Glock | Virgin-Cosworth | 1:26.294 | | | 20 |
| 22 | 23 | (Italy) Vitantonio Liuzzi | HRT-Cosworth | 1:26.323 | | | 21 |
| 23 | 22 | (Australia) Daniel Ricciardo | HRT-Cosworth | 1:26.479 | | | 22 |
| 24 | 25 | (Belgium) Jérôme d'Ambrosio | Virgin-Cosworth | 1:26.510 | | | 24 |
107% time: 1:27.288

Note:

1. – Sébastien Buemi was demoted five grid places for causing an avoidable collision with Nick Heidfeld at the German Grand Prix.

=== Race ===
| Pos | No | Driver | Constructor | Laps | Time/Retired | Grid | Points |
|---|---|---|---|---|---|---|---|
| 1 | 4 | (United Kingdom) Jenson Button | McLaren-Mercedes | 70 | 1:46:42.337 | 3 | 25 |
| 2 | 1 | (Germany) Sebastian Vettel | Red Bull Racing-Renault | 70 | +3.588 | 1 | 18 |
| 3 | 5 | (Spain) Fernando Alonso | Ferrari | 70 | +19.819 | 5 | 15 |
| 4 | 3 | (United Kingdom) Lewis Hamilton | McLaren-Mercedes | 70 | +48.338 | 2 | 12 |
| 5 | 2 | (Australia) Mark Webber | Red Bull Racing-Renault | 70 | +49.742 | 6 | 10 |
| 6 | 6 | (Brazil) Felipe Massa | Ferrari | 70 | +1:23.176 | 4 | 8 |
| 7 | 15 | (United Kingdom) Paul di Resta | Force India-Mercedes | 69 | +1 Lap | 11 | 6 |
| 8 | 18 | (Switzerland) Sébastien Buemi | Toro Rosso-Ferrari | 69 | +1 Lap | 23 | 4 |
| 9 | 8 | (Germany) Nico Rosberg | Mercedes | 69 | +1 Lap | 7 | 2 |
| 10 | 19 | (Spain) Jaime Alguersuari | Toro Rosso-Ferrari | 69 | +1 Lap | 16 | 1 |
| 11 | 16 | (Japan) Kamui Kobayashi | Sauber-Ferrari | 69 | +1 Lap | 13 | |
| 12 | 10 | (Russia) Vitaly Petrov | Renault | 69 | +1 Lap | 12 | |
| 13 | 11 | (Brazil) Rubens Barrichello | Williams-Cosworth | 68 | +2 Laps | 15 | |
| 14 | 14 | (Germany) Adrian Sutil | Force India-Mercedes | 68 | +2 Laps | 8 | |
| 15 | 17 | (Mexico) Sergio Pérez | Sauber-Ferrari | 68 | +2 Laps | 10 | |
| 16 | 12 | (Venezuela) Pastor Maldonado | Williams-Cosworth | 68 | +2 Laps | 17 | |
| 17 | 24 | (Germany) Timo Glock | Virgin-Cosworth | 66 | +4 Laps | 20 | |
| 18 | 22 | (Australia) Daniel Ricciardo | HRT-Cosworth | 66 | +4 Laps | 22 | |
| 19 | 25 | (Belgium) Jérôme d'Ambrosio | Virgin-Cosworth | 65 | +5 Laps | 24 | |
| 20 | 23 | (Italy) Vitantonio Liuzzi | HRT-Cosworth | 65 | +5 Laps | 21 | |
| Ret | 20 | (Finland) Heikki Kovalainen | Lotus-Renault | 55 | Water leak | 18 | |
| Ret | 7 | (Germany) Michael Schumacher | Mercedes | 26 | Gearbox | 9 | |
| Ret | 9 | (Germany) Nick Heidfeld | Renault | 23 | Fire/Explosion | 14 | |
| Ret | 21 | (Italy) Jarno Trulli | Lotus-Renault | 17 | Water leak | 19 | |

== Championship standings after the race ==
Drivers' Championship standings

| Pos. | Driver | Points |
|---|---|---|
| 1 | (Germany) Sebastian Vettel | 234 |
| 2 | (Australia) Mark Webber | 149 |
| 3 | (United Kingdom) Lewis Hamilton | 146 |
| 4 | (Spain) Fernando Alonso | 145 |
| 5 | (United Kingdom) Jenson Button | 134 |

Constructors' Championship standings

| Pos. | Constructor | Points |
|---|---|---|
| 1 | (Austria) Red Bull Racing-Renault | 383 |
| 2 | (United Kingdom) McLaren-Mercedes | 280 |
| 3 | (Italy) Ferrari | 215 |
| 4 | (Germany) Mercedes | 80 |
| 5 | (United Kingdom) Renault | 66 |

- Note: Only the top five positions are included for both sets of standings.

== See also ==
- 2011 Hungaroring GP2 Series round
- 2011 Hungaroring GP3 Series round

| Previous race: 2011 German Grand Prix | FIA Formula One World Championship; 2011 season | Next race: 2011 Belgian Grand Prix |
| Previous race: 2010 Hungarian Grand Prix | Hungarian Grand Prix | Next race: 2012 Hungarian Grand Prix |
