= Randy Krummenacher =

Swiss motorcycle racer

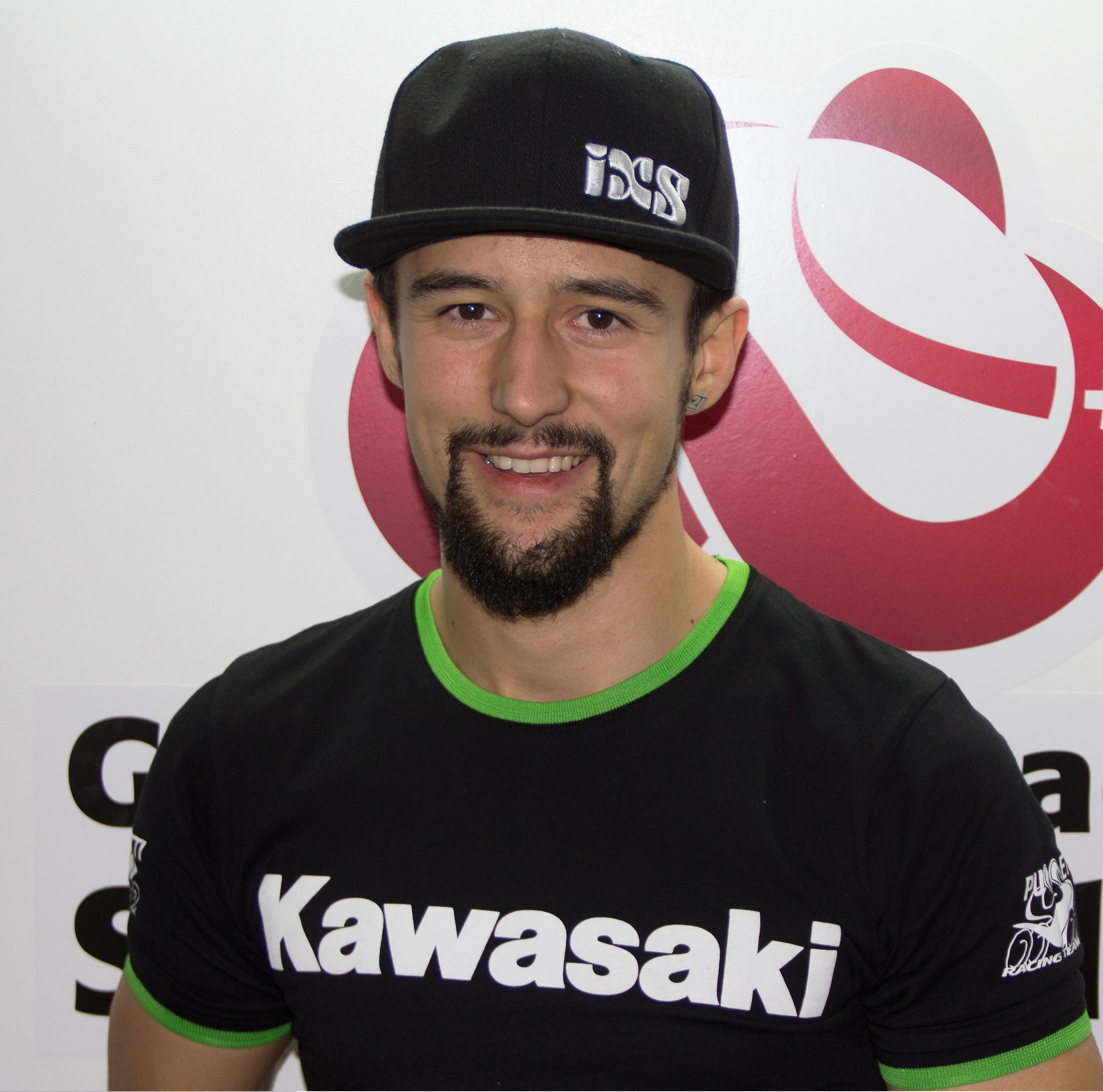
- Krummenacher in 2017
- Nationality: Swiss
- Born: 24 February 1990 (age 36); Grüt, Switzerland
- Current team: Dynavolt Intact GP MotoE
- Bike number: 3
Motorcycle racing career statistics
Moto2 World Championship
Active years	2011–2015
Manufacturers	Kalex, Suter
Championships	0
2015 championship position	21st (31 pts)
Starts / Wins / Podiums / Poles / F. laps / Points; 79 / 0 / 0 / 0 / 1 / 161
125cc World Championship
Active years	2006–2010
Manufacturers	KTM, Aprilia
Championships	0
2010 championship position	9th (113 pts)
Starts / Wins / Podiums / Poles / F. laps / Points; 67 / 0 / 1 / 0 / 1 / 224
MotoE World Championship
Active years	2023
Manufacturers	Ducati
Championships	0
2023 championship position	5th (167 pts)
Starts / Wins / Podiums / Poles / F. laps / Points; 16 / 1 / 4 / 0 / 1 / 167
Superbike World Championship
Active years	2017
Manufacturers	Kawasaki
Championships	0
2017 championship position	16th (50 pts)
Starts / Wins / Podiums / Poles / F. laps / Points; 18 / 0 / 0 / 0 / 0 / 50
Supersport World Championship
Active years	2016, 2018–2021
Manufacturers	Kawasaki, Yamaha, MV Agusta
Championships	1 (2019)
2021 championship position	10th (156 pts)
Starts / Wins / Podiums / Poles / F. laps / Points; 58 / 7 / 16 / 4 / 6 / 668

Randy Ritsch Krummenacher (born 24 February 1990) is a Swiss motorcycle racer. He won the Supersport World Championship in 2019.

== Career ==
=== Early life ===
Krummenacher was born in Grüt, Zürich, Switzerland.

=== 125cc World Championship ===
In 2007, Krummenacher competed in Grand Prix motorcycle racing's 125cc category for the Red Bull KTM team.

On 10 June 2007, Krummenacher finished third in the Catalan motorcycle Grand Prix, scoring his first podium.

On Monday 24 March 2008, Krummenacher was injured when he crashed his mountain bike while training on a snow-covered downhill run. Shortly afterward, he traveled to Jerez, Spain for the upcoming Spanish motorcycle Grand Prix where his injury was initially diagnosed as a bruised rib. On Friday 28 March 2008, Krummenacher was too ill to practice. He was subsequently taken to a hospital in Jerez where it was discovered that he had lost more than three liters of blood and he immediately underwent life-saving surgery to remove his ruptured spleen. In 2009, Krummenacher rode for the De Graaf Aprilia team, partnering Danny Webb.

=== Supersport & Superbike World Championship ===
For the 2016 season, Krummenacher moved into the Supersport World Championship with Kawasaki Puccetti Racing, partnering defending champion Kenan Sofuoğlu, coming in third in the championship.

After moving up to the Superbike category for the 2017 season which he finished in 16th place, Krummenacher made his return to Supersport in 2018 with the Bardahl Evan Bros. WorldSSP Team scoring three podium finishes, including a win in Thailand, in his first four races of the season.

=== 2022 ===
In 2022, Krummenacher moved to CM Racing Team.

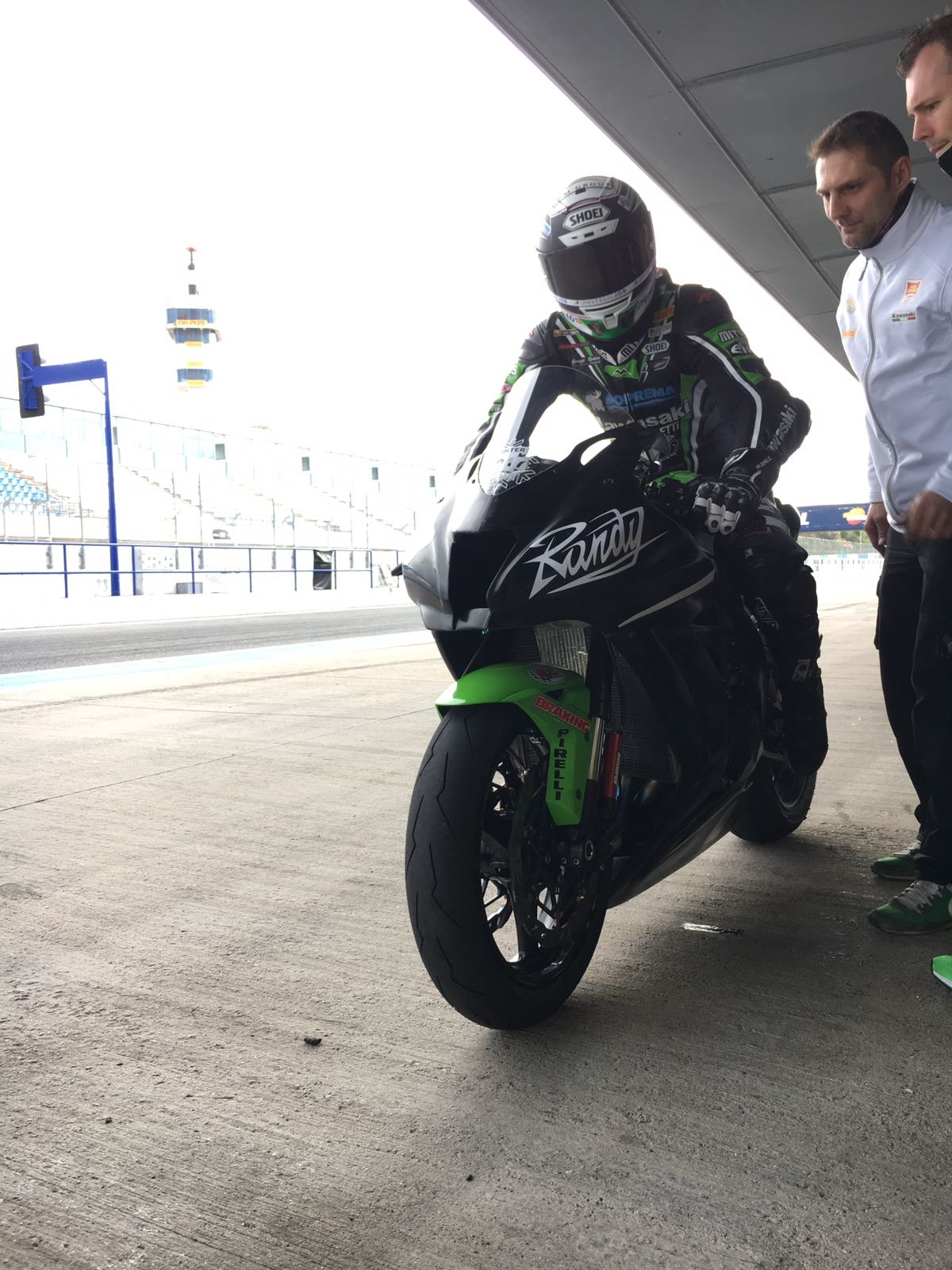
Krummenacher at Jerez in 2016

== Career statistics ==
=== Grand Prix motorcycle racing ===
==== By season ====
Season	Class	Motorcycle	Team	Race	Win	Podium	Pole	FLap	Pts	Plcd
2006	125cc	KTM	Red Bull KTM GP125	4	0	0	0	0	0	NC
2007	125cc	KTM	Red Bull KTM 125	17	0	1	0	1	69	13th
2008	125cc	KTM	Red Bull KTM 125	13	0	0	0	0	10	25th
2009	125cc	Aprilia	DeGraaf Grand Prix	16	0	0	0	0	32	21st
2010	125cc	Aprilia	Stipa - Molenaar Racing GP	17	0	0	0	0	113	9th
2011	Moto2	Kalex	GP Team Switzerland Kiefer Racing	17	0	0	0	0	52	18th
2012	Moto2	Kalex	GP Team Switzerland	13	0	0	0	1	32	18th
2013	Moto2	Suter	Technomag carXpert	13	0	0	0	0	22	17th
2014	Moto2	Suter	IodaRacing Project	18	0	0	0	0	24	24th
2015	Moto2	Kalex	JIR Racing Team	18	0	0	0	0	31	21st
2023	MotoE	Ducati	Dynavolt Intact GP MotoE	16	1	3	0	1	167	5th
Total				**152**	**1**	**4**	**0**	**3**	**552**	

==== By class ====
Class	Seasons	1st GP	1st Pod	1st Win	Race	Win	Podiums	Pole	FLap	Pts	WChmp
125cc	2006–2010	2006 Great Britain	2007 Catalunya		67	0	1	0	1	224	0
Moto2	2011–2015	2011 Qatar			79	0	0	0	1	161	0
MotoE	2023–	2023 France	2023 France Race 1	2023 Great Britain Race 1	16	1	4	0	1	167	0
Total	2006–2015, 2023-				**157**	**1**	**4**	**0**	**3**	**552**	

==== Races by year ====
(key) (Races in bold indicate pole position; races in italics indicate fastest lap)

Year	Class	Bike	1	2	3	4	5	6	7	8	9	10	11	12	13	14	15	16	17	18	Pos	Pts
2006	125cc	KTM	SPA	QAT	TUR	CHN	FRA	ITA	CAT	NED	GBR; 20	GER; 16	CZE	MAL	AUS	JPN	POR; 16	VAL; Ret			NC	0
2007	125cc	KTM	QAT; 19	SPA; 17	TUR; 15	CHN; 27	FRA; 13	ITA; 13	CAT; 3	GBR; 13	NED; 12	GER; 5	CZE; 9	RSM; 6	POR; 10	JPN; 19	AUS; 12	MAL; 17	VAL; 15		13th	69
2008	125cc	KTM	QAT; 22	SPA; WD	POR	CHN; Ret	FRA; 10	ITA; 17	CAT; 15	GBR; 13	NED; 19	GER; Ret	CZE; 23	RSM; 26	INP	JPN	AUS; 21	MAL; 19	VAL; 17		25th	10
2009	125cc	Aprilia	QAT; 22	JPN; 18	SPA; 17	FRA; 15	ITA; 13	CAT; 10	NED; Ret	GER; 11	GBR; 18	CZE; 17	INP; Ret	RSM; 17	POR; 10	AUS; 15	MAL; 13	VAL; 9			21st	32
2010	125cc	Aprilia	QAT; 6	SPA; 8	FRA; 14	ITA; 6	GBR; 7	NED; 6	CAT; 7	GER; 11	CZE; 17	INP; 7	RSM; 9	ARA; DSQ	JPN; 11	MAL; 10	AUS; 9	POR; 7	VAL; 9		9th	113
2011	Moto2	Kalex	QAT; 27	SPA; 27	POR; 7	FRA; 12	CAT; 5	GBR; 11	NED; 9	ITA; 13	GER; 4	CZE; Ret	INP; 21	RSM; 19	ARA; 21	JPN; 24	AUS; 21	MAL; 21	VAL; 16		18th	52
2012	Moto2	Kalex	QAT; 11	SPA; 22	POR; 19	FRA; Ret	CAT; 8	GBR; 14	NED; 11	GER; 24	ITA; 12	INP; 17	CZE; 21	RSM; DNS	ARA	JPN	MAL	AUS; 8	VAL; 19		18th	32
2013	Moto2	Suter	QAT; 19	AME; Ret	SPA; 17	FRA; 10	ITA; 15	CAT; 6	NED; 11	GER; 17	INP; 19	CZE; 16	GBR; 19	RSM; 16	ARA	MAL	AUS	JPN	VAL; 21		17th	22
2014	Moto2	Suter	QAT; 13	AME; 13	ARG; 27	SPA; 15	FRA; 13	ITA; 26	CAT; 25	NED; Ret	GER; 7	INP; Ret	CZE; 24	GBR; 13	RSM; 14	ARA; 27	JPN; 21	AUS; 19	MAL; 26	VAL; 22	24th	24
2015	Moto2	Kalex	QAT; 17	AME; 21	ARG; 21	SPA; 14	FRA; 12	ITA; 14	CAT; 18	NED; 14	GER; 13	INP; Ret	CZE; 20	GBR; 12	RSM; 14	ARA; 17	JPN; 10	AUS; 10	MAL; 17	VAL; 21	21st	31
2023	MotoE	Ducati	FRA1; 3	FRA2; 7	ITA1; 5	ITA2; 7	GER1; 2	GER2; 6	NED1; 3	NED2; 9	GBR1; 1	GBR2; Ret	AUT1; 11	AUT2; 7	CAT1; 6	CAT2; 9	RSM1; 8	RSM2; 11			5th	167

=== Supersport World Championship ===
==== Races by year ====
(key) (Races in bold indicate pole position; races in italics indicate fastest lap)

Year	Bike	1	2	3	4	5	6	7	8	9	10	11	12	13	14	15	16	17	18	19	20	21	22	23	24	Pos	Pts
2016	Kawasaki	AUS; 1	THA; 4	SPA; 2	**NED**; 4	ITA; Ret	MAL; 8	GBR; 3	ITA; 4	GER; 6	FRA; 5	SPA; Ret	QAT; 5													3rd	140
2018	Yamaha	AUS; 2	THA; 1	SPA; 11	NED; 2	ITA; 5	GBR; 4	CZE; 5	ITA; 5	POR; 5	FRA; 5	ARG; 6	QAT; 5													4th	159
2019	Yamaha	AUS; 1	THA; 2	SPA; 1	**NED**; 2	**ITA**; 1	**SPA**; 2	ITA; 1	GBR; 4	POR; 2	FRA; Ret	ARG; 7	QAT; 5													1st	213
2020	MV Agusta	AUS; DSQ	SPA	SPA	POR	POR	SPA	SPA	SPA	SPA	SPA	SPA	FRA	FRA	POR	POR										NC	0
2021	Yamaha	SPA; 11	SPA; 9	POR; 9	POR; 9	ITA; 7	ITA; Ret	NED; 5	NED; 3	CZE; 11	CZE; Ret	SPA; 6	SPA; NC	FRA; 11	FRA; 14	SPA; 1	SPA; 4	SPA; C	SPA; Ret	POR; 7	POR; 7	ARG	ARG	INA; 8	INA; 8	10th	156

=== Superbike World Championship ===
==== Races by year ====
(key) (Races in bold indicate pole position; races in italics indicate fastest lap)

Year	Bike	1		2		3		4		5		6		7		8		9		10		11		12		13		Pos	Pts
Year	Bike	R1	R2	R1	R2	R1	R2	R1	R2	R1	R2	R1	R2	R1	R2	R1	R2	R1	R2	R1	R2	R1	R2	R1	R2	R1	R2	Pos	Pts
2017	Kawasaki	AUS; 10	AUS; 16	THA; 12	THA; Ret	SPA; 14	SPA; 14	NED; 11	NED; 14	ITA; 13	ITA; 15	GBR; 14	GBR; Ret	ITA; 7	ITA; 8	USA; 17	USA; 14	GER; 12	GER; Ret	POR	POR	FRA	FRA	SPA	SPA	QAT	QAT	16th	50

=== ARRC Supersports 600 ===
==== Races by year ====
(key) (Races in bold indicate pole position; races in italics indicate fastest lap)

Year	Bike	1		2		3		4		5		6		Pos	Pts
Year	Bike	R1	R2	R1	R2	R1	R2	R1	R2	R1	R2	R1	R2	Pos	Pts
2018	Yamaha	CHA	CHA	AUS	AUS	JPN	JPN	IND	IND	INA	INA	CHA; 9	CHA; 11	21st	12

=== CIV National Championship ===
==== Races by year ====
(key) (Races in bold indicate pole position; races in italics indicate fastest lap)

Year	Class	Bike	1	2	3	4	5	6	7	8	9	10	11	12	Pos	Pts
2022	Superbike	Yamaha	MIS1	MIS2	VAL1; 5	VAL2; Ret	MUG1; 4	MUG2; 5	MIS1; 8	MIS2; 3	MUG1; 1	MUG2; 2	IMO1; 4	IMO2; Ret	5th	117

=== FIM Endurance World Championship ===
Year	Team	Bike	Tyre	Rider	Pts	TC
2025	(France) TATI TEAM AVA6 Racing	Honda CBR1000RR	**P**	(Switzerland) Randy Krummenacher (France) Hugo Clère (France) Martin Renaudin	18*	12th*
