= 2018 Asia Road Racing Championship =

23rd season Asia Road Racing Championship

2018 Asia Road Racing Championship
Previous:	2017	Next:	2019

The 2018 Idemitsu FIM Asia Road Racing Championship was the 23rd season of the Asia Road Racing Championship. The Season started on 2 March at Chang International Circuit in Thailand and ended on December 2 also at Chang International Circuit in Thailand.

== Calendar and results ==
The Calendar was released in December 2017.

Round	Circuit	Date	SS600 Winners	AP250 Winners	UB150 Winners
1	(Thailand) Chang International Circuit	2-4 March	R1: (Thailand) Thitipong Warokorn	R1: (Thailand) Anupab Sarmoon	R1: (Malaysia) Izzat Zaidi
1	(Thailand) Chang International Circuit	2-4 March	R2: (Australia) Anthony West	R2: (Thailand) Muklada Sarapuech	R2: (Malaysia) Helmi Azman
2	(Australia) The Bend Motorsport Park	19-22 April	R1: Race Cancelled (Note: Race 1 of Round 2, IDEMITSU FIM ASIA ROAD RACING CHAMPIONSHIP at The Bend Motorsports Park is cancelled due to two separate incidents brought out the red flags twice in the duration of the race, no points were awarded.)	R1: (Indonesia) Rheza Danica Ahrens	R1: (Malaysia) Izzat Zaidi
2	(Australia) The Bend Motorsport Park	19-22 April	R2: (Japan) Yuki Ito	R2: (Indonesia) Rheza Danica Ahrens	R2: (Malaysia) Haziq Fairues
3	(Japan) Suzuka Circuit	1-3 June	R1: (Malaysia) Azlan Shah	R1: (Indonesia) Rheza Danica Ahrens	R1: (Malaysia) Helmi Azman
3	(Japan) Suzuka Circuit	1-3 June	R2: (Australia) Anthony West	R2: (Indonesia) Rheza Danica Ahrens	R2: (Indonesia) Gupita Kresna
4	(India) Madras International Circuit	3-5 August	R1: (Australia) Anthony West	R1: (Indonesia) Rheza Danica Ahrens	R1: (Malaysia) Ahmad Fazli Sham
4	(India) Madras International Circuit	3-5 August	R2: (Australia) Anthony West	R2: (Indonesia) Rafid Topan Sucipto	R2: (Malaysia) Ahmad Fazli Sham
5	(Indonesia) Sentul International Circuit	12-14 October	R1: (Indonesia) Andi Farid Izdihar	R1: (Indonesia) Rheza Danica Ahrens	R1: (Indonesia) Agung Fachrul
5	(Indonesia) Sentul International Circuit	12-14 October	R2: (Indonesia) Andi Farid Izdihar	R2: (Indonesia) Awhin Sanjaya	R2: (Malaysia) Haziq Fairues
6	(Thailand) Chang International Circuit	30 November-2 December	R1: (Thailand) Ratthapong Wilairot	R1: (Indonesia) Rafid Topan Sucipto	R1: (Indonesia) Wawan Wello
6	(Thailand) Chang International Circuit	30 November-2 December	R2: (Thailand) Ratthapong Wilairot	R2: (Indonesia) Andy Muhammad Fadly	R2: (Indonesia) Gupita Kresna

Footnotes;

== Teams and riders ==
=== Supersport 600 ===
SS600 Entry List
Team	Constructor	No.	Rider	Rounds
Astra Honda Racing Team	Honda	16	(Indonesia) Irfan Ardiansyah	1–2, 4–5
Astra Honda Racing Team	Honda	27	(Indonesia) Andi Farid Izdihar	All
Astra Honda Racing Team	Honda	31	(Indonesia) Gerry Salim	6
Musashi Boon Siew Honda	Honda	20	(Malaysia) Azroy Anuar	All
Musashi Boon Siew Honda	Honda	21	(Malaysia) Zaqhwan Zaidi	1, 3–6
Musashi Boon Siew Honda	Honda	634	(Japan) Tomoyoshi Koyama	All
Idemitsu Honda Racing India by T.Pro Ten10	Honda	23	(Japan) Taiga Hada	All
Thai Honda Racing Club	Honda	45	(Thailand) Sittisak Aonchaweang	6
A.P. Honda Racing Thailand	Honda	73	(Thailand) Warit Thongnoppakun	6
A.P. Honda Racing Thailand	Honda	88	(Japan) Keisuke Kurihara	All
A.P. Honda Racing Thailand	Honda	123	(Thailand) Passawit Thitivararak	All
Manuel Tech KYT Kawasaki Racing	Kawasaki	25	(Malaysia) Azlan Shah	All
Manuel Tech KYT Kawasaki Racing	Kawasaki	33	(Indonesia) Ahmad Yudhistira	All
Army Girl Team MF & Kawasaki	Kawasaki	57	(Japan) Kyosuke Okuda	3
ZK Racing Kawasaki	Kawasaki	63	(Malaysia) Zulfahmi Khairuddin	5–6
ZK Racing Kawasaki	Kawasaki	66	(Malaysia) Ibrahim Norrodin	1–4
Core Kawasaki Thailand Racing Team	Kawasaki	100	(Thailand) Thitipong Warokorn	1
NextGen Motorsports	Suzuki	39	(Australia) Scott Nicholson	2
	Yamaha	12	(Australia) Broc Pearson	2
Webike IKAZUCHI Racing	Yamaha	13	(Australia) Anthony West	1, 3–4
Webike IKAZUCHI Racing	Yamaha	29	(Australia) Patrick Li	1–4, 6
Webike IKAZUCHI Racing	Yamaha	37	(New Zealand) Liam Taylor MacDonald	5
Webike IKAZUCHI Racing	Yamaha	40	(United Kingdom) Joseph Francis	2
Webike IKAZUCHI Racing	Yamaha	40	(United Kingdom) Joseph Francis	3–4
Webike IKAZUCHI Racing	Yamaha	86	(South Africa) Sheridan Morais	5–6
Webike IKAZUCHI Racing	Yamaha	121	(Switzerland) Randy Krummenacher	6
Akeno Speed Yamaha	Yamaha	22	(Japan) Soichiro Minamimoto	3
YAMAHA Thailand Racing Team	Yamaha	24	(Thailand) Decha Kraisart	All
YAMAHA Thailand Racing Team	Yamaha	56	(Thailand) Ratthapong Wilairot	All
Team Hong Leong Yamaha Malaysia	Yamaha	32	(Malaysia) Ramdan Rosli	All
Team Hong Leong Yamaha Malaysia	Yamaha	127	(Malaysia) Kasma Daniel	All
Yamaha Racing Asean	Yamaha	64	(Thailand) Keminth Kubo	All
Yamaha Racing Asean	Yamaha	76	(Japan) Yuki Ito	All
ONEXOX TKKR Racing Team	Yamaha	80	(Malaysia) Hafiq Azmi	All
ONEXOX TKKR Racing Team	Yamaha	92	(Malaysia) Muzakkir Mohamed	1–5

Key
Regular rider
Wildcard rider
Replacement rider

=== Asia Production 250 ===
AP250 Entry List
Team	Constructor	No.	Rider	Rounds
Team HIRO	Honda	14	(Japan) Masaharu Ono	3
Team HIRO	Honda	92	(Japan) Akito Narita	3
Astra Honda Racing Team	Honda	16	(Indonesia) Mario Aji	All
Astra Honda Racing Team	Honda	123	(Indonesia) Rheza Danica Ahrens	All
Astra Honda Racing Team	Honda	198	(Indonesia) Awhin Sanjaya	All
Team TEC2	Honda	20	(Japan) Yuta Kasai	3
IDEA & Kurodaya	Honda	23	(Japan) Kota Sunatomari	3
A.P. Honda Racing Thailand	Honda	35	(Thailand) Kritchaporn Kaewsonthi	All
A.P. Honda Racing Thailand	Honda	44	(Thailand) Muklada Sarapuech	1–3, 5–6
A.P. Honda Racing Thailand	Honda	88	(Thailand) Piyawat Patoomyos	6
A.P. Honda Racing Thailand	Honda	149	(Thailand) Tatchakorn Buasri	4
Ultra Speed Detail's Proliner Elmo	Honda	38	(Indonesia) Nico Julian	5
Astra Motor Racing Team Jakarta	Honda	63	(Indonesia) Sigit Purnomo Harjono	5
Yuzy Honda Vietnam Racing Team	Honda	65	(Vietnam) Cao Viet Nam	All
Idemitsu Honda Racing India by T-Pro Ten10	Honda	80	(India) Sethu Rajiv	All
Idemitsu Honda Racing India by T-Pro Ten10	Honda	81	(India) Anish Damodara Shetty	All
United Oil M-Mate Racing	Honda	185	(Indonesia) Yossie Legisadewo	5
United Oil M-Mate Racing	Honda	888	(Chinese Taipei) Chiou Ke-Lung	All
Trickstar Racing	Kawasaki	11	(Japan) Takehiro Yamamoto	3
SIC Junior ZK Racing	Kawasaki	36	(Malaysia) Izam Ikmal	1, 6
SIC Junior ZK Racing	Kawasaki	66	(Malaysia) Danial Syahmi	2–4
SIC Junior ZK Racing	Kawasaki	78	(Malaysia) Idil Fitri Mahadi	1–3, 5–6
Manual Tech KYT Kawasaki Racing	Kawasaki	41	(South Korea) Kim Woo-Jung	6
Manual Tech KYT Kawasaki Racing	Kawasaki	108	(Indonesia) Andy Muhammad Fadly	All
Yamaha Philippines Racing Team	Yamaha	22	(Philippines) McKinley Kyle Paz	3
Yamaha Philippines Racing Team	Yamaha	71	(Philippines) Masato Fernando	3
ONEXOX TKKR Racing Team	Yamaha	24	(Malaysia) Hafiza Rofa	1–5
ONEXOX TKKR Racing Team	Yamaha	25	(Malaysia) Adam Fiqrie Bobie Farid	1–2
ONEXOX TKKR Racing Team	Yamaha	56	(Malaysia) Muzakkir Mohamed	6
ONEXOX TKKR Racing Team	Yamaha	72	(Malaysia) Faiz Zekri Sabri	6
ONEXOX TKKR Racing Team	Yamaha	93	(Malaysia) Khairul Ikhwan Ajis	1–5
ONEXOX TKKR Racing Team	Yamaha	222	(Indonesia) Reynaldo Ratukore	3–6
CKJ Yamaha Racing Team	Yamaha	30	(Malaysia) Hafiz Nor Azman	All
CKJ Yamaha Racing Team	Yamaha	50	(Malaysia) Ahmad Afif Amran	All
Yamaha Thailand Racing Team	Yamaha	45	(Thailand) Peerapong Boonlert	All
Yamaha Thailand Racing Team	Yamaha	90	(Thailand) Kanatan Jaiman	All
Yamaha Thailand Racing Team	Yamaha	500	(Thailand) Anupab Sarmoon	All
Yamaha Racing Indonesia	Yamaha	55	(Indonesia) Galang Hendra Pratama	6
Yamaha Racing Indonesia	Yamaha	179	(Indonesia) Richard Taroreh	All
Yamaha Racing Indonesia	Yamaha	901	(Indonesia) M. Faerozi	1–5
Yamaha BAF Akai Jaya Racetech	Yamaha	57	(Indonesia) Janoer Saputra	5
Pro Power Asia Dog Fight Racing	Yamaha	79	(Japan) Karen Ogura	3
Puma RV's	Yamaha	87	(Australia) Zachary Levy	2
Yamaha Yamalube KYT TJM WR Super Battery	Yamaha	96	(Indonesia) Anggi Setiawan	All
Yamaha Yamalube KYT TJM WR Super Battery	Yamaha	250	(Indonesia) Rafid Topan Sucipto	All
Team YSS TDR Vrooam Furukawa WRX Puma Bali	Yamaha	125	(Indonesia) Ricky Susanto	5
Team One For All	Yamaha	410	(Japan) Suzuki Takashi	All

Key
Regular rider
Wildcard rider
Replacement rider

=== Underbone 150 ===
UB150 Entry List
Team	Constructor	No.	Rider	Rounds
Yuzy Honda Vietnam Racing Team	Honda	17	(Vietnam) Le Khanh Loc	3–6
Yuzy Honda Vietnam Racing Team	Honda	39	(Malaysia) Aiman Azman	All
Yuzy Honda Vietnam Racing Team	Honda	63	(Malaysia) Amirul Ariff Musa	All
Yuzy Honda Vietnam Racing Team	Honda	99	(Vietnam) Nguyen Vu Thanh	1–2
SCK Rapido Hi Rev Honda Racing Team	Honda	31	(Australia) Travis Hall	2–6
SCK Rapido Hi Rev Honda Racing Team	Honda	32	(Malaysia) Helmi Azman	All
SCK Rapido Hi Rev Honda Racing Team	Honda	56	(Thailand) Nattawit Sungkijsawad	1
SCK Rapido Hi Rev Honda Racing Team	Honda	65	(Malaysia) Fakhrusy Syakirin Rostam	All
Orbit SND CNC Sporting	Honda	152	(Indonesia) Agung Fachrul	5
UMA Racing Yamaha Maju Motor Asia Team	Yamaha	13	(Malaysia) Akid Aziz	All
UMA Racing Yamaha Maju Motor Asia Team	Yamaha	26	(Malaysia) Haziq Fairues	All
UMA Racing Yamaha Maju Motor Asia Team	Yamaha	27	(Vietnam) To Ha Dong Nghi	6
UMA Racing Yamaha Maju Motor Asia Team	Yamaha	28	(Vietnam) Huynh Minh Sang	1, 3
UMA Racing Yamaha Maju Motor Asia Team	Yamaha	112	(Indonesia) Elsan Efendi	5
UMA Racing Yamaha Maju Motor Asia Team	Yamaha	123	(Philippines) McKinley Kyle Paz	2, 4, 6
Locky Taylor Racing	Yamaha	15	(Australia) Locky Taylor	2
RCB Yamaha YY Pang Racing	Yamaha	18	(Malaysia) Adib Rosley	All
RCB Yamaha YY Pang Racing	Yamaha	98	(Malaysia) Izzat Zaidi	All
Yamaha Yamalube SND Factory	Yamaha	23	(Indonesia) Gupita Kresna	1–3, 5–6
Yamaha Yamalube SND Factory	Yamaha	38	(Indonesia) Wawan Wello	5–6
Yamaha Yamalube SND Factory	Yamaha	199	(Indonesia) Syahrul Amin	1–3, 5–6
Team One For All	Yamaha	24	(Thailand) Peerapong Luiboonpeng	1, 3–6
Team One For All	Yamaha	36	(Malaysia) Affendi Rosli	All
ONEXOX TKKR Racing Team	Yamaha	25	(Malaysia) Adam Fiqrie Farid	3–4
ONEXOX TKKR Racing Team	Yamaha	46	(Malaysia) Ahmad Fazli Sham	All
ONEXOX TKKR Racing Team	Yamaha	47	(Malaysia) Syafieq Aiman	3–6
ONEXOX TKKR Racing Team	Yamaha	71	(Malaysia) Haiekal Akmal	1–2
Yamaha Cardinals Tune Boss Bird Phetkasem Thailand	Yamaha	29	(Thailand) Paitoon Nakthong	1
Yamaha Racing Indonesia	Yamaha	60	(Indonesia) Wahyu Aji Trilaksana	All
Yamaha Racing Indonesia	Yamaha	89	(Indonesia) Wahyu Nugroho	5
Usaha Jaya Racetech Cargloss	Yamaha	75	(Indonesia) Reza Fahlevi	5
United Oil M-Mate Racing	Yamaha	81	(Japan) Miu Nakahara	3–6
Racing Boy TT Racing Thailand	Yamaha	86	(Thailand) Suttipat Patchareetron	1, 6
Racing Boy TT Racing Thailand	Yamaha	159	(Thailand) Akkarak Tesang	6
Yamaha Pradtipong Tunu Boss Bird Phetkasem	Yamaha	92	(Thailand) Chanacai Boonggnam	6
Yamalube TT Racing Boy Thailand	Yamaha	156	(Thailand) Sawapol Ninpong	6
Yamaha 549 Kaboci Sponzen Racing Team	Yamaha	157	(Indonesia) Murobbil Vittoni	5
Yamaha Racingboy Motul DID Motobat Tatum Racing	Yamaha	200	(Thailand) Suttipaj Patchaeetron	1
NRT Marvin Putra TPK48 HT JRT Racetech	Yamaha	270	(Indonesia) Rusman Fadhil	5

Key
Regular rider
Wildcard rider
Replacement rider

== Championships standings ==
Points

Position	**1st**	**2nd**	**3rd**	**4th**	**5th**	**6th**	**7th**	**8th**	**9th**	**10th**	**11th**	**12th**	**13th**	**14th**	**15th**
Points	25	20	16	13	11	10	9	8	7	6	5	4	3	2	1

=== Riders standings ===
==== Supersport 600 ====
Pos.	Rider	Bike	BUR (Thailand)		BEN (Australia)		SUZ (Japan)		MAD (India)		SEN (Indonesia)		BUR (Thailand)		Pts
Pos.	Rider	Bike	R1	R2	R1	R2	R1	R2	R1	R2	R1	R2	R1	R2	Pts
1	(Thailand) Ratthapong Wilairot	Yamaha	6	14	C	2	8	7	9	8	5	3	**1**	**1**	141
2	(Australia) Anthony West	Yamaha	2	1			3	1	**1**	**1**					136
3	(Indonesia) Ahmad Yudhistira	Kawasaki	5	Ret	C	11	2	3	Ret	9	2	2	3	3	131
4	(Malaysia) Azlan Shah	Kawasaki	3	3	C	10	**1**	**5**	Ret	5	8	7	6	5	123
5	(Indonesia) Andi Farid Izdihar	Honda	10	6	C	6	Ret	6	4	Ret	**1**	**1**	7	7	117
6	(Japan) Tomoyoshi Koyama	Honda	7	5	C	DNS	7	10	5	2	7	8	5	4	107
7	(Thailand) Decha Kraisart	Yamaha	Ret	2	C	DNS	11	8	Ret	7	12	6	2	2	96
8	(Malaysia) Zaqhwan Zaidi	Honda	**4**	**15**			5	9	2	4	3	4	Ret	DNS	94
9	(Japan) Yuki Ito	Yamaha	12	4	**C**	**1**	4	4	8	16	DNS	DNS	14	8	86
10	(Thailand) Keminth Kubo	Yamaha	9	7	C	5	6	2	Ret	10	Ret	9	4	Ret	83
11	(Japan) Taiga Hada	Honda	8	9	C	17	12	11	3	3	6	10	13	12	79
12	(Japan) Keisuke Kurihara	Honda	16	13	C	4	16	18	10	12	10	18	11	6	47
13	(Malaysia) Azroy Anuar	Honda	11	8	C	7	13	14	6	Ret	9	19	15	14	47
14	(Malaysia) Kasma Daniel	Yamaha	15	Ret	C	8	14	13	7	6	Ret	13	12	Ret	40
15	(Indonesia) Irfan Ardiansyah	Honda	13	10	C	DNS			14	14	4	5			37
16	(Malaysia) Ramdan Rosli	Yamaha	14	11	C	3	Ret	15	13	Ret	Ret	11	Ret	15	33
17	(Thailand) Passawit Thitivararak	Honda	18	12	C	16	15	16	12	11	11	17	10	10	31
18	(Thailand) Thitipong Warokorn	Kawasaki	1	Ret											25
19	(South Africa) Sheridan Morais	Yamaha									17	12	8	13	15
20	(Malaysia) Zulfahmi Khairuddin	Kawasaki									13	14	16	9	12
21	(Switzerland) Randy Krummenacher	Yamaha											9	11	12
22	(Japan) Soichiro Minamimoto	Yamaha					9	12							11
23	(Malaysia) Hafiq Azmi	Yamaha	17	16	C	15	18	17	11	13	15	15	19	16	11
24	(United Kingdom) Joseph Francis	Yamaha			C	9	Ret	Ret	Ret	Ret					7
25	(Japan) Kyosuke Okuda	Kawasaki					10	Ret							6
26	(Malaysia) Ibrahim Noroddin	Kawasaki	19	17	C	13	17	19	15	15					5
27	(Malaysia) Muzakkir Mohamed	Yamaha	20	18	C	12	Ret	20	16	Ret	16	16			4
28	(New Zealand) Liam Taylor MacDonald	Yamaha									14	Ret			2
29	(Australia) Scott Nicholson	Suzuki			C	14									2
30	(Australia) Patrick Li	Yamaha	Ret	Ret	C	DNS	19	Ret	Ret	Ret			Ret	Ret	0
31	(Thailand) Sittisak Aonchaweang	Honda											17	Ret	0
32	(Thailand) Warit Thongnoppakun	Honda											20	Ret	0
33	(Indonesia) Gerry Salim	Honda											18	17	0
34	(Australia) Broc Pearson	Yamaha			C	DNS									0

Colour	Result
Gold	Winner
Silver	Second place
Bronze	Third place
Green	Points classification
Blue	Non-points classification
Blue	Non-classified finish (NC)
Purple	Retired, not classified (Ret)
Red	Did not qualify (DNQ)
Red	Did not pre-qualify (DNPQ)
Black	Disqualified (DSQ)
White	Did not start (DNS)
White	Withdrew (WD)
White	Race cancelled (C)
Blank	Did not practice (DNP)
Blank	Did not arrive (DNA)
Blank	Excluded (EX)

**Bold** – Pole position
Italics – Fastest lap

==== Asia Production 250 ====
Pos.	Rider	Bike	BUR (Thailand)		BEN (Australia)		SUZ (Japan)		MAD (India)		SEN (Indonesia)		BUR (Thailand)		Pts
Pos.	Rider	Bike	R1	R2	R1	R2	R1	R2	R1	R2	R1	R2	R1	R2	Pts
1	(Indonesia) Rheza Danica Ahrens	Honda	3	9	**1**	**1**	**1**	**1**	**1**	**17**	1	2	4	2	226
2	(Thailand) Anupab Sarmoon	Yamaha	**1**	**5**	4	4	2	6	Ret	3	7	7	3	3	158
3	(Indonesia) Rafid Topan Sucipto	Yamaha	5	2	8	9	DNS	DNS	4	1	3	4	1	4	151
4	(Indonesia) Awhin Sanjaya	Honda	11	6	Ret	3	4	8	5	7	2	1	2	6	147
5	(Indonesia) Andy Muhammad Fadly	Kawasaki	10	7	3	5	30	3	Ret	2	5	3	Ret	1	130
6	(Indonesia) Mario Aji	Honda	2	10	2	2	3	2	2	Ret	**Ret**	**Ret**	Ret	10	128
7	(Thailand) Muklada Sarapuech	Honda	10	1	5	7	5	Ret			4	5	DSQ	DNS	86
8	(Thailand) Peerapong Boonlert	Yamaha	4	4	14	10	9	7	Ret	5	11	13	8	11	82
9	(Indonesia) Reynaldo Ratukore	Yamaha					6	9	3	4	15	9	10	12	64
10	(Indonesia) Anggi Setiawan	Yamaha	Ret	11	7	6	10	12	9	8	9	8	DNS	Ret	64
11	(Thailand) Kritchaporn Kaewsonthi	Honda	6	12	6	11	8	Ret	Ret	10	14	14	**18**	**8**	55
12	(Thailand) Kanatan Jaiman	Yamaha	9	3	12	14	15	13	Ret	Ret	21	17	6	7	52
13	(Malaysia) Ahmad Afif Amran	Yamaha	13	16	10	8	7	4	18	Ret	13	16	9	Ret	49
14	(Indonesia) M. Faerozi	Yamaha	12	13	9	Ret	13	10	10	Ret	6	11			44
15	(Indonesia) Richard Taroreh	Yamaha	8	8	19	13	28	Ret	8	9	10	Ret	Ret	Ret	40
16	(Malaysia) Hafiz nor Azman	Yamaha	14	14	11	12	16	16	7	Ret	17	15	11	16	28
17	(Indonesia) Galang Hendra Pratama	Yamaha											7	5	20
18	(Thailand) Tatchakorn Buasri	Honda							6	6					20
19	(Indonesia) Sigit Purno Harjono	Honda									8	6			18
20	(Thailand) Piyawat Patoomyos	Honda											5	9	18
21	(Japan) Akito Narita	Honda					11	5							16
22	(Malaysia) Hafiza Rofa	Yamaha	16	15	13	Ret	18	15	12	13	20	18			12
23	(Malaysia) Khairul Ikhwan Ajis	Yamaha	15	17	17	Ret	14	14	11	14	19	19			12
24	(Vietnam) Cao Viet Nam	Honda	17	Ret	20	19	22	20	15	11	16	20	12	14	12
25	(Indonesia) Yossie Legisadewo	Honda									12	10			10
26	(Japan) Takehiro Yamamoto	Kawasaki					12	11							9
27	(India) Sethu Rajiv	Honda	18	18	DNS	DNS	25	24	13	16	23	21	13	15	7
28	(Malaysia) Danial Syahmi	Kawasaki			21	16	26	21	14	12					6
29	(Malaysia) Izam Ikmal	Kawasaki	19	Ret									14	13	5
30	(Indonesia) Nico Julian	Honda									18	12			4
31	(India) Anish Damodara Shetty	Honda	Ret	20	15	15	24	25	Ret	19	25	24	22	20	2
32	(Japan) Suzuki Takashi	Yamaha	22	19	16	17	21	Ret	16	15	24	23	16	Ret	1
33	(Malaysia) Muzakkir Mohamed	Yamaha											15	17	0
34	(Philippines) Masato Fernando	Yamaha					17	Ret							0
35	(Japan) Kota Sunatomari	Honda					Ret	17							0
36	(Chinese Taipei) Chiou Ke-Lung	Kawasaki	20	21	18	18	20	22	17	18	22	22	19	19	0
37	(Malaysia) Idil Fitri Mahadi	Kawasaki	21	22	DNS	20	31	26			27	25	17	18	0
38	(Japan) Karen Ogura	Yamaha					19	18							0
39	(Japan) Masaharu Ono	Honda					23	19							0
40	(Malaysia) Faiz Zekri Sabri	Yamaha											20	21	0
41	(South Korea) Kim Woo-Jung	Kawasaki											21	22	0
42	(Philippines) McKinley Kyle Paz	Yamaha					27	23							0
43	(Japan) Yuta Kasai	Honda					29	27							0
44	(Malaysia) Adam Fiqrie Farid	Yamaha	Ret	Ret	WD	WD									0
45	(Indonesia) Janoer Saputra	Yamaha									Ret	Ret			0
46	(Indonesia) Ricky Susanto	Honda									Ret	Ret			0
47	(Australia) Zachary Levy	Yamaha			DNS	DNS									0

Colour	Result
Gold	Winner
Silver	Second place
Bronze	Third place
Green	Points classification
Blue	Non-points classification
Blue	Non-classified finish (NC)
Purple	Retired, not classified (Ret)
Red	Did not qualify (DNQ)
Red	Did not pre-qualify (DNPQ)
Black	Disqualified (DSQ)
White	Did not start (DNS)
White	Withdrew (WD)
White	Race cancelled (C)
Blank	Did not practice (DNP)
Blank	Did not arrive (DNA)
Blank	Excluded (EX)

**Bold** – Pole position
Italics – Fastest lap

==== Underbone 150 ====
Pos.	Rider	Bike	BUR (Thailand)		BEN (Australia)		SUZ (Japan)		MAD (India)		SEN (Indonesia)		BUR (Thailand)		Pts
Pos.	Rider	Bike	R1	R2	R1	R2	R1	R2	R1	R2	R1	R2	R1	R2	Pts
1	(Malaysia) Helmi Azman	Honda	**5**	**1**	**2**	**Ret**	1	4	2	2	2	6	2	4	197
2	(Malaysia) Izzat Zaidi	Yamaha	1	8	1	7	6	3	8	6	5	DNS	14	10	130
3	(Malaysia) Ahmad Fazli Sham	Yamaha	7	6	10	Ret	10	9	1	1	8	17	4	8	117
4	(Indonesia) Gupita Kresna	Yamaha	Ret	10	Ret	5	3	1			3	Ret	5	1	110
5	(Malaysia) Akid Aziz	Yamaha	4	15	5	3	2	6	Ret	Ret	Ret	3	8	Ret	95
6	(Malaysia) Amirul Ariff Musa	Honda	6	3	11	11	Ret	12	Ret	8	4	8	7	7	87
7	(Malaysia) Affendi Rosli	Yamaha	2	4	12	6	Ret	8	9	Ret	11	12	1	Ret	84
8	(Indonesia) Wahyu Aji Trilaksana	Yamaha	3	9	3	13	4	3	Ret	7	Ret	14	Ret	DNS	83
9	(Indonesia) Syahrun Amin	Yamaha	8	2	Ret	4	Ret	5			6	11	10	6	83
10	(Malaysia) Haziq Fairues	Yamaha	Ret	Ret	Ret	1	7	Ret	5	12	**17**	**1**	13	Ret	77
11	(Malaysia) Aiman Azman	Honda	12	12	4	12	Ret	14	11	5	13	Ret	9	2	73
12	(Malaysia) Adib Rosley	Yamaha	13	EXC	8	9	9	11	6	4	16	7	11	Ret	67
13	(Indonesia) Wawan Wello	Yamaha									7	4	**1**	**5**	58
14	(Australia) Travis Hall	Honda			9	10	11	13	7	3	18	Ret	12	Ret	50
15	(Malaysia) Fakhrusy Syakirin Rostam	Honda	Ret	5	Ret	8	**5**	**Ret**	**4**	**Ret**	15	13	15	Ret	48
16	(Philippines) McKinley Kyle Paz	Yamaha			6	2			Ret	Ret			Ret	3	46
17	(Indonesia) Agung Fachrul	Honda									1	2			45
18	(Thailand) Peerapong Luiboonpeng	Yamaha	DNS	DNS			8	7	3	Ret	12	Ret	Ret	Ret	37
19	(Malaysia) Haeikal Akmal	Yamaha	9	7	7	Ret					22	Ret	16	12	29
20	(Indonesia) Reza Fahlevi	Yamaha									19	5	6	9	28
21	(Malaysia) Syafieq Aiman	Yamaha					14	10	Ret	9	20	Ret	19	13	18
22	(Japan) Miu Nakahara	Yamaha					13	15	10	10	Ret	15	Ret	15	18
23	(Vietnam) Huynh Minh Sang	Yamaha	10	DNS			12	Ret							10
24	(Indonesia) Wahyu Nugroho	Yamaha									14	9			9
25	(Vietnam) Nguyen Vu Thanh	Honda	11	13	DNS	DNS									8
26	(Vietnam) Le Khanh Loc	Honda					15	16	Ret	11	21	16	17	14	8
27	(Indonesia) Rusman Fadhil	Yamaha									9	Ret			7
28	(Indonesia) Murobbil Vittoni	Yamaha									10	Ret			6
29	(Indonesia) Elsan Efendi	Yamaha									Ret	10			6
30	(Thailand) Suttipat Patchareetron	Yamaha	16	11									18	Ret	5
31	(Thailand) Sawapol Ninpong	Yamaha											21	11	5
32	(Thailand) Nattawut Sungkijsawad	Honda	15	14											3
33	(Thailand) Suttipaj Patchareetron	Yamaha	14	Ret											2
34	(Malaysia) Adam Fiqrie	Yamaha					16	17	Ret	Ret					0
35	(Thailand) Chanacai Boonggnam	Yamaha											20	16	0
36	(Thailand) Akkarak Tesang	Yamaha											22	17	0
37	(Vietnam) To Ha Dong Nghi	Yamaha											23	18	0
38	(Thailand) Paitoon Nakthong	Yamaha	Ret	Ret											0
39	(Australia) Locky Taylor	Yamaha			DNS	DNS									0

Colour	Result
Gold	Winner
Silver	Second place
Bronze	Third place
Green	Points classification
Blue	Non-points classification
Blue	Non-classified finish (NC)
Purple	Retired, not classified (Ret)
Red	Did not qualify (DNQ)
Red	Did not pre-qualify (DNPQ)
Black	Disqualified (DSQ)
White	Did not start (DNS)
White	Withdrew (WD)
White	Race cancelled (C)
Blank	Did not practice (DNP)
Blank	Did not arrive (DNA)
Blank	Excluded (EX)

**Bold** – Pole position
Italics – Fastest lap

=== Teams championship ===
==== Supersport 600 ====
Pos.	Teams	Bike No.	BUR (Thailand)		BEN (Australia)		SUZ (Japan)		MAD (India)		SEN (Indonesia)		BUR (Thailand)		Pts
Pos.	Teams	Bike No.	R1	R2	R1	R2	R1	R2	R1	R2	R1	R2	R1	R2	Pts
1	(Indonesia) Manual Tech KYT Kawasaki Racing	33	5	Ret	C	11	2	3	Ret	9	2	2	3	3	254
1	(Indonesia) Manual Tech KYT Kawasaki Racing	25	3	3	C	10	**1**	**5**	Ret	5	8	7	6	5	254
2	(Malaysia) Musashi Boon Siew Honda	634	7	5	C	DNS	7	10	5	2	7	8	5	4	248
2	(Malaysia) Musashi Boon Siew Honda	21	**4**	**15**			5	9	2	4	3	4	Ret	DNS	248
2	(Malaysia) Musashi Boon Siew Honda	20	11	8	C	7	13	14	6	Ret	9	19	15	14	248
3	YAMAHA Thailand Racing Team	56	6	14	C	2	8	7	9	8	5	3	**1**	**1**	237
3	YAMAHA Thailand Racing Team	24	Ret	2	C	DNS	11	8	Ret	7	12	6	2	2	237
4	(Japan) Webike IKAZUCHI Racing	13	2	1			3	1	**1**	**1**					172
4	(Japan) Webike IKAZUCHI Racing	86									17	12	8	13	172
4	(Japan) Webike IKAZUCHI Racing	121											9	11	172
4	(Japan) Webike IKAZUCHI Racing	40			C	9	Ret	Ret	Ret	Ret					172
4	(Japan) Webike IKAZUCHI Racing	37									14	Ret			172
4	(Japan) Webike IKAZUCHI Racing	29	Ret	Ret	C	DNS	19	Ret	Ret	Ret			Ret	Ret	172
5	(Thailand) Yamaha Racing ASEAN	76	12	4	**C**	**1**	4	4	8	16	DNS	DNS	14	8	169
5	(Thailand) Yamaha Racing ASEAN	64	9	7	C	5	6	2	Ret	10	Ret	9	4	Ret	169
6	(Indonesia) Astra Honda Racing Team	27	10	6	C	6	Ret	6	4	Ret	**1**	**1**	7	7	154
6	(Indonesia) Astra Honda Racing Team	16	13	10	C	DNS			14	14	4	5			154
6	(Indonesia) Astra Honda Racing Team	31											18	17	154
7	Idemitsu Honda Racing India by T.Pro Ten10	23	8	9	C	17	12	11	3	3	6	10	13	12	79
8	A.P. Honda Racing Thailand	88	16	13	C	4	16	18	10	12	10	18	11	6	78
8	A.P. Honda Racing Thailand	123	18	12	C	16	15	16	12	11	11	17	10	10	78
8	A.P. Honda Racing Thailand	73											20	Ret	78
9	Team Hong Leong Yamaha Malaysia	127	15	Ret	C	8	14	13	7	6	Ret	13	12	Ret	73
9	Team Hong Leong Yamaha Malaysia	32	14	11	C	3	Ret	15	13	Ret	Ret	11	Ret	15	73
10	(Malaysia) ZK Racing Kawasaki	63									13	14	16	9	17
10	(Malaysia) ZK Racing Kawasaki	66	19	17	C	13	17	19	15	15					17
11	(Malaysia) ONEXOX TKKR Racing Team	80	17	16	C	15	18	17	11	13	15	15	19	16	15
11	(Malaysia) ONEXOX TKKR Racing Team	92	20	18	C	12	Ret	20	16	Ret	16	16			15

Colour	Result
Gold	Winner
Silver	Second place
Bronze	Third place
Green	Points classification
Blue	Non-points classification
Blue	Non-classified finish (NC)
Purple	Retired, not classified (Ret)
Red	Did not qualify (DNQ)
Red	Did not pre-qualify (DNPQ)
Black	Disqualified (DSQ)
White	Did not start (DNS)
White	Withdrew (WD)
White	Race cancelled (C)
Blank	Did not practice (DNP)
Blank	Did not arrive (DNA)
Blank	Excluded (EX)

**Bold** – Pole position
Italics – Fastest lap
