= 2008 Indonesian GP2 Asia Series round =

Motor race in Sentul, Indonesia

(Indonesia) 2008 Indonesian GP2 round
Round details
- Round 2 of 5 rounds in the 2008 GP2 Series
- Location: Sentul International Circuit in Sentul, Indonesia
- Course: Permanent racing facility 3.965 km (2.464 mi)

GP2 Series

Feature race
- Date: 16 February 2008
- Laps: 46 (182.390 km)

Pole position
Driver	(Russia) Vitaly Petrov	Barwa Int Campos Team
- Time: 1:19.337

Podium
First	(Switzerland) Sébastien Buemi	Trust Team Arden
Second	(Spain) Adrián Vallés	Fisichella Motor Sport
Third	(United Kingdom) Ben Hanley	Barwa Int Campos Team

Fastest lap
Driver	(Brazil) Bruno Senna	iSport International
- Time: 1:15.686 (on lap 43)

Sprint race
- Date: 17 February 2008
- Laps: 25 (99.125 km)

Podium
First	(Malaysia) Fairuz Fauzy	Super Nova Racing
Second	(Brazil) Bruno Senna	iSport International
Third	(Russia) Vitaly Petrov	Barwa Int Campos Team

Fastest lap
Driver	(Malaysia) Fairuz Fauzy	Super Nova Racing
- Time: 1:23.203 (on lap 16)

The 2008 Indonesian GP2 Asia Series round was a GP2 Asia Series motor race held on 16 and 17 February 2008 at Sentul International Circuit in Sentul, Indonesia. It was the second round of the 2008 GP2 Asia Series.

== Classification ==
=== Qualifying ===
Pos.	No.	Driver	Team	Time	Gap	Grid
1	5	(Russia) Vitaly Petrov	Barwa International Campos Team	1:19.337		1
2	27	(Italy) Luca Filippi	Qi-Meritus Mahara	1:22.390	+3.053	2
3	16	(Spain) Adrián Vallés	Fisichella Motor Sport International	1:22.658	+3.321	3
4	4	(France) Romain Grosjean	ART Grand Prix	1:22.751	+3.414	4
5	8	(Malaysia) Fairuz Fauzy	Super Nova Racing	1:22.782	+3.445	10^{1}
6	7	(Denmark) Christian Bakkerud	Super Nova Racing	1:23.141	+3.804	5
7	1	(India) Karun Chandhok	iSport International	1:23.161	+3.824	6
8	18	(Latvia) Harald Schlegelmilch	Trident Racing	1:23.241	+3.904	7
9	11	(Switzerland) Sébastien Buemi	Trust Team Arden	1:23.266	+3.929	8
10	2	(Brazil) Bruno Senna	iSport International	1:23.367	+4.030	9
11	19	(China) Ho-Pin Tung	Trident Racing	1:23.539	+4.202	11
12	21	(Italy) Marco Bonanomi	Piquet Sports	1:23.758	+4.421	12
13	26	(Japan) Hiroki Yoshimoto	Qi-Meritus Mahara	1:23.922	+4.585	13
14	14	(Italy) Davide Valsecchi	Durango	1:23.943	+4.606	14
15	24	(Serbia) Miloš Pavlović	BCN Competicion	1:23.959	+4.622	15
16	15	(Brazil) Alberto Valerio	Durango	1:24.046	+4.709	16
17	9	(Belgium) Jérôme d'Ambrosio	DAMS	1:24.163	+4.826	17
18	6	(United Kingdom) Ben Hanley	Barwa International Campos Team	1:24.274	+4.937	18
19	12	(Pakistan) Adam Khan	Trust Team Arden	1:24.382	+5.045	19
20	25	(Turkey) Jason Tahincioglu	BCN Competicion	1:24.713	+5.376	20
21	23	(Brazil) Diego Nunes	DPR	1:24.737	+5.400	21
22	22	(India) Armaan Ebrahim	DPR	1:25.084	+5.747	22
23	3	(United Kingdom) Stephen Jelley	ART Grand Prix	1:25.104	+5.767	25^{2}
24	10	(Japan) Kamui Kobayashi	DAMS	1:25.416	+6.079	23
25	17	(Romania) Michael Herck	Fisichella Motor Sport International	1:25.907	+6.570	24
26	20	(Italy) Marcello Puglisi	Piquet Sports	No time^{2}		26

Notes

- ^1 – Fairuz Fauzy and Stephen Jelley received five-place grid penalties for passing the checkered flag twice.
- ^2 – Marcello Puglisi didn't set a time due to a gearbox problem.

=== Feature race ===
Pos.	No.	Driver	Team	Laps	Time/Retired	Grid	Points
1	11	(Switzerland) Sébastien Buemi	Trust Team Arden	46	1:10:28.016	8	10
2	16	(Spain) Adrián Vallés	Fisichella Motor Sport International	46	+9.206	3	8
3	6	(United Kingdom) Ben Hanley	Barwa International Campos Team	46	+11.139	18	6
4	4	(France) Romain Grosjean	ART Grand Prix	46	+16.301	4	5
5	5	(Russia) Vitaly Petrov	Barwa International Campos Team	46	+27.840	1	4+2
6	24	(Serbia) Miloš Pavlović	BCN Competicion	46	+41.163	15	3
7	2	(Brazil) Bruno Senna	iSport International	46	+43.257	9	2+1
8	8	(Malaysia) Fairuz Fauzy	Super Nova Racing	46	+48.685	10	1
9	17	(Romania) Michael Herck	Fisichella Motor Sport International	46	+1:11.539	24	
Ret	15	(Brazil) Alberto Valerio	Durango	36	Retired	16	
Ret	26	(Japan) Hiroki Yoshimoto	Qi-Meritus Mahara	33	Retired	13	
Ret	14	(Italy) Davide Valsecchi	Durango	30	Retired	14	
Ret	19	(China) Ho-Pin Tung	Trident Racing	29	Retired	11	
Ret	9	(Belgium) Jérôme d'Ambrosio	DAMS	26	Retired	17	
Ret	21	(Italy) Marco Bonanomi	Piquet Sports	25	Retired	12	
Ret	22	(India) Armaan Ebrahim	DPR	20	Retired	22	
Ret	23	(Brazil) Diego Nunes	DPR	18	Retired	21	
Ret	1	(India) Karun Chandhok	iSport International	15	Retired	6	
Ret	12	(Pakistan) Adam Khan	Trust Team Arden	1	Retired	19	
Ret	25	(Turkey) Jason Tahincioglu	BCN Competicion	1	Retired	20	
Ret	7	(Denmark) Christian Bakkerud	Super Nova Racing	0	Retired	5	
Ret	18	(Latvia) Harald Schlegelmilch	Trident Racing	0	Retired	7	
DNS	10	(Japan) Kamui Kobayashi	DAMS	0	Did not start	23	
DNS	20	(Italy) Marcello Puglisi	Piquet Sports	0	Did not start	26	
DSQ	27	(Italy) Luca Filippi	Qi-Meritus Mahara	46	Disqualified^{3}	2	
DSQ	3	(United Kingdom) Stephen Jelley	ART Grand Prix	46	Disqualified^{4}	25	

Notes

- ^3 – Luca Filippi won the race but was disqualified after the stewards found out he had used tyres allocated to his teammate Hiroki Yoshimoto.
- ^4 – Stephen Jelley finished ninth but was disqualified due to his car being refuelled on the grid prior to the start of the race.

=== Sprint race ===
Pos.	No.	Driver	Team	Laps	Time/Retired	Grid	Points
1	8	(Malaysia) Fairuz Fauzy	Super Nova Racing	25	45:06.344	1	6+1
2	2	(Brazil) Bruno Senna	iSport International	25	+1.480	2	5
3	5	(Russia) Vitaly Petrov	Barwa International Campos Team	25	+1.700	4	4
4	4	(France) Romain Grosjean	ART Grand Prix	25	+2.243	5	3
5	16	(Spain) Adrián Vallés	Fisichella Motor Sport International	25	+5.079	7	2
6	19	(China) Ho-Pin Tung	Trident Racing	25	+7.208	13	1
7	11	(Switzerland) Sébastien Buemi	Trust Team Arden	25	+7.538	8	
8	21	(Italy) Marco Bonanomi	Piquet Sports	25	+10.199	15	
9	22	(India) Armaan Ebrahim	DPR	25	+14.656	16	
10	23	(Brazil) Diego Nunes	DPR	25	+16.549	17	
11	12	(Pakistan) Adam Khan	Trust Team Arden	25	+18.197	19	
12	17	(Romania) Michael Herck	Fisichella Motor Sport International	25	+19.389	9	
13	1	(India) Karun Chandhok	iSport International	25	+19.632	18	
14	7	(Denmark) Christian Bakkerud	Super Nova Racing	25	+30.798	21	
15	10	(Japan) Kamui Kobayashi	DAMS	25	+30.813	23	
16	6	(United Kingdom) Ben Hanley	Barwa International Campos Team	25	+31.378	6	
17	25	(Turkey) Jason Tahincioglu	BCN Competicion	25	+33.431	20	
18	20	(Italy) Marcello Puglisi	Piquet Sports	23	+2 laps	24	
19	14	(Italy) Davide Valsecchi	Durango	23	+2 laps	12	
20	26	(Japan) Hiroki Yoshimoto	Qi-Meritus Mahara	22	+3 laps	11	
21	27	(Italy) Luca Filippi	Qi-Meritus Mahara	22	+3 laps	25	
Ret	24	(Serbia) Miloš Pavlović	BCN Competicion	15	Retired	3	
Ret	3	(United Kingdom) Stephen Jelley	ART Grand Prix	15	Retired	26	
Ret	9	(Belgium) Jérôme d'Ambrosio	DAMS	8	Retired	14	
Ret	18	(Latvia) Harald Schlegelmilch	Trident Racing	3	Retired	22	
Ret	15	(Brazil) Alberto Valerio	Durango	2	Retired	10	

== Standings after the event ==
Drivers' Championship standings

	Pos.	Driver	Points
	1	(France) Romain Grosjean	27
	2	(Brazil) Bruno Senna	17
4	3	(Spain) Adrián Vallés	15
1	4	(Malaysia) Fairuz Fauzy	14
21	5	(Switzerland) Sébastien Buemi	10

Teams' Championship standings

	Pos.	Team	Points
	1	(France) ART Grand Prix	27
	2	(United Kingdom) iSport International	23
6	3	(Spain) Barwa International Campos Team	16
2	4	(Italy) Fisichella Motor Sport International	15
1	5	(United Kingdom) Super Nova Racing	14

- Note: Only the top five positions are included for both sets of standings.

== See also ==
- 2008 Indonesian Speedcar Series round

Previous round: 2008 UAE 1st GP2 Asia Series round	GP2 Asia Series Championship; 2008 season	Next round: 2008 Malaysian GP2 Asia Series round
Previous round: None	Indonesian GP2 Asia Series round	Next round: None
