= 2008 Indonesian Speedcar Series round =

The layout of the Sentul International Circuit

The 2008 Indonesian Speedcar Series round was a Speedcar Series motor race held on 16 and 17 February 2008 at Sentul International Circuit in Sentul, Indonesia. It was the second round of the 2008 Speedcar Series.

== Classification ==
=== Qualifying ===
Pos.	No.	Driver	Team	Time	Gap	Grid
1	18	(Indonesia) Ananda Mikola	Speedcar Team	1:38.013		1
2	08	(Germany) Uwe Alzen	Phoenix Racing Team	1:39.122	+1.109	2
3	20	(Austria) Mathias Lauda	G.P.C. Squadra Corse	1:39.203	+1.190	3
4	10	(Italy) Gianni Morbidelli	Speedcar Team	1:39.353	+1.340	4
5	69	(United Kingdom) Johnny Herbert	Speedcar Team	1:39.447	+1.434	5
6	07	(Sweden) Stefan Johansson	Speedcar Team	1:39.504	+1.491	6
7	80	(Germany) Klaus Ludwig	Phoenix Racing Team	1:39.611	+1.598	7
8	27	(France) Jean Alesi	Speedcar Team	1:39.663	+1.650	8
9	06	(Japan) Ukyo Katayama	Speedcar Team	1:40.005	+1.992	9
10	85	(United Arab Emirates) Hasher Al Maktoum	Union Properties	1:40.103	+2.090	10
11	20	(France) David Terrien	Union Properties	1:40.167	+2.154	11
12	17	(France) Fabien Giroix	Team First Centreville	1:40.825	+2.812	12
13	36	(Indonesia) Moreno Soeprapto	Speedcar Team	1:43.526	+5.513	13
14	71	(France) Nicolas Navarro	Team First Centreville	1:46.170	+8.157	14

=== Race 1 ===
Pos.	No.	Driver	Team	Laps	Time/Retired	Grid	Points
1	27	(France) Jean Alesi	Speedcar Team	27	45:48.803	8	10
2	21	(Austria) Mathias Lauda	G.P.C. Squadra Corse	27	+5.460	3	8
3	69	(United Kingdom) Johnny Herbert	Speedcar Team	27	+10.160	5	6
4	20	(France) David Terrien	Union Properties	27	+26.388	11	5
5	08	(Germany) Uwe Alzen	Phoenix Racing Team	27	+35.213	2	4
6	71	(France) Nicolas Navarro	Team First Centreville	27	+35.419	14	3
7	80	(Germany) Klaus Ludwig	Phoenix Racing Team	27	+58.450	7	2
8	18	(Indonesia) Ananda Mikola	Speedcar Team	26	+1 lap	1	1
9	85	(United Arab Emirates) Hasher Al Maktoum	Union Properties	26	+1 lap	10	
10	17	(France) Fabien Giroix	Team First Centreville	25	+2 laps	12	
11	10	(Italy) Gianni Morbidelli	Speedcar Team	24	+3 laps	4	
12	07	(Sweden) Stefan Johansson	Speedcar Team	23	+4 laps	12	
13	06	(Japan) Ukyo Katayama	Speedcar Team	23	+4 laps	9	
Ret	36	(Indonesia) Moreno Soeprapto	Speedcar Team	10	Retired	13	

=== Race 2 ===
Pos.	No.	Driver	Team	Laps	Time/Retired	Grid	Points
1	08	(Germany) Uwe Alzen	Phoenix Racing Team	26	40:39.625	4	10
2	27	(France) Jean Alesi	Speedcar Team	26	+2.594	8	8
3	18	(Indonesia) Ananda Mikola	Speedcar Team	26	+4.586	1	6
4	20	(France) David Terrien	Union Properties	26	+7.871	5	5
5	21	(Austria) Mathias Lauda	G.P.C. Squadra Corse	26	+8.821	7	4
6	80	(Germany) Klaus Ludwig	Phoenix Racing Team	26	+12.939	2	3
7	69	(United Kingdom) Johnny Herbert	Speedcar Team	26	+17.061	6	2
8	06	(Japan) Ukyo Katayama	Speedcar Team	26	+21.942	13	1
9	85	(United Arab Emirates) Hasher Al Maktoum	Union Properties	26	+26.889	9	
10	71	(France) Nicolas Navarro	Team First Centreville	26	+28.728	3	
11	07	(Sweden) Stefan Johansson	Speedcar Team	26	+44.793	12	
12	17	(France) Fabien Giroix	Team First Centreville	26	+59.396	10	
13	10	(Italy) Gianni Morbidelli	Speedcar Team	23	+3 laps	11	
Ret	36	(Indonesia) Moreno Soeprapto	Speedcar Team	17	Retired	14	

== See also ==
- 2008 Indonesian GP2 Asia Series round
