= Sentul International Circuit =

Motorsport race track in Indonesia

- Grand Prix Circuit (1993–present)
- Location: Sentul City, Bogor Regency, West Java, Indonesia
- Coordinates: 6°32′9.1″S 106°51′24.4″E
- Capacity: 50,000
- Broke ground: January 1992; 34 years ago
- Opened: 21 August 1993; 33 years ago
- Major events: Former: Grand Prix motorcycle racing Indonesian motorcycle Grand Prix (1996–1997); World SBK (1994–1997); Asia Road Racing Championship (1996–2000, 2002–2018); Porsche Carrera Cup Asia (2006–2009); GP2 Asia (2008); Speedcar Series (2008); A1 GP (2006); Indonesian Grand Prix (1993, 1995)
- Website: https://sentulinternationalcircuit.com/

Grand Prix Circuit (1993–present)
- Length: 3.965 km (2.464 mi)
- Turns: 11
- Race lap record: 1:15.686 ( (Brazil) Bruno Senna, Dallara GP2/05, 2008, GP2 Asia)

Sentul International Circuit is a 50,000-capacity permanent motor racing circuit located at Sentul City, Babakan Madang, Bogor Regency, West Java, Indonesia, near the toll gate of Jakarta towards Bogor city and areas at the foot of Jonggol Mountains

Its pit facilities have easy access to the Jagorawi Toll Road. The current circuit is a truncated version of the original design. Approximately 40% shorter than the original, the circuit runs clockwise and is predominantly used for motorcycle racing and the Asian F3 series. Sentul is a relatively simple, smooth, broad track with large runoff areas, enabling non-bumpy and smooth driving at racing speeds. Sentul has a 900 m (3,000 ft) main straight that allows speeds of up to 300 km/h (190 mph) before slowing for the right-hand Turn 1. The only truly high-speed corner at Sentul is Turn 2. The fastest driver on four-wheel machines can do 220 km/h (140 mph), and the fastest rider can do 190 km/h (120 mph) on two-wheel machines. They can take Turn 2 as a complex "S" bend when they get out from the tighter Turn 1 at around 140 km/h (87 mph). The wide corners allow good passing with various racing lines.

Located in Bogor Regency, Sentul is a hilly area at the foot of the Jonggol Mountains and a bit cooler than the tropical city of Jakarta. However, the track can still get extremely hot under direct sunlight. It is also humid and wet as well. Such characteristics cause distress to European tuners, riders and drivers who are accustomed to cooler climates.

== History ==
Sentul International Circuit (section) was designed to meet the Formula One motor racing standard and was the first serious attempt outside Japan to meet such a standard in Asia. The vision came to Indonesia around 1990 when Hutomo Mandala Putra, motor racing enthusiast and son of President Suharto, began promoting the construction of a track at Sentul. Racing had previously been held at the short, tight and relatively dangerous Jaya Ancol Circuit, on the Java Sea coast in North Jakarta. In August 1993, the circuit was officially inaugurated with the 1993 Indonesian Grand Prix for Formula Holden.

While Sentul International Circuit was intended to be Indonesia's Formula Two showcase to the world, its tight corners and shortened 3.965 km (2.464 mi) length rendered it unsuitable for Formula One. On 13 October 1996 the Pacific GP was to be held at the Sentul Circuit but it was cancelled for previous mentioned reason. Sentul has been used for the Superbike World Championship between 1994 and 1997 and the FIM Road Racing World Championship Grand Prix in 1996 and 1997.

The 1997 Asian financial crisis worsened the situation and made motor racing an unaffordable luxury for many Indonesian enthusiasts who had been participating. The facility has also come to be overshadowed by the Sepang International Circuit, built in 1999, which possessed a superior track layout and facilities.

In the mid-2000s, the circuit held two rounds of the A1 Grand Prix of Nations, in the 2005–06 and 2006–07 seasons respectively. In 2008, the GP2 Asia Series raced at Sentul. A Superstars Series race was planned in 2012 and an Asian Le Mans Series race in 2013, but these ultimately were cancelled.

MotoGP was set to return to Indonesia in 2017, dependent on securing the 15 billion rupiah (approximately US$1.12 million) in funding required to get the circuit up to FIM Grade 1. Due to the rapid rise in popularity of Formula One in Indonesia following the debut of Rio Haryanto in 2016, Formula One Management was also looking into the viability of holding a race at Sentul provided the upgrades could be completed, however the plan never materialized. Dorna Sports eventually gave the hosting rights for the return of the Indonesian motorcycle Grand Prix to the Mandalika Circuit in Lombok instead of Sentul, which was held in March 2022.

Sentul International Circuit continues to host various events but mostly motorbike racing with ISSOM events also held throughout the year. It also hosted the para-cycling road race for the 2018 Asian Para Games.

== Track description ==
- Track length: 3.965 km (2.464 mi)
- Width: 15 m (49 ft)
- Longest straight: 900 m (3,000 ft)
- 50 pit garages
- 2 covered grandstands

Other facilities include:

- Motocross, Autocross and Go-Karts Circuits
- Three-star International Hotel
- Bungalows / Guest House
- International Golf Course
- Restaurant
- Recreation Centre

== Lap records ==
As of October 2018, the fastest official race lap records at the Sentul International Circuit are listed as:

Category	Time	Driver	Vehicle	Event
Grand Prix Circuit (1993–present): 3.965 km (2.464 mi)
GP2 Asia	1:15.686	Bruno Senna	Dallara GP2/05	2008 Sentul GP2 Asia Series round
A1GP	1:18.110	Robbie Kerr	Lola A1GP	2006 2nd Sentul A1GP round
Formula Renault 3.5	1:22.824	Matthew Halliday	Tatuus FRV6	2006 Sentul Formula V6 Asia round
Formula Three	1:24.594	Tyson Sy	Dallara F304	2005 2nd Sentul Asian F3 round
500cc	1:26.141	Tadayuki Okada	Honda NSR500 (NV0X)	1997 Indonesian motorcycle Grand Prix
World SBK	1:27.151	John Kocinski	Honda RVF750 RC45	1997 Sentul World SBK round
250cc	1:28.256	Max Biaggi	Honda NSR250	1997 Indonesian motorcycle Grand Prix
Porsche Carrera Cup	1:29.786	Rodolfo Ávila	Porsche 911 (997) GT3 S	2009 Sentul Porsche Carrera Cup Asia round
Supersport	1:30.131	Ahmad Yudhistira	Kawasaki Ninja ZX-6R	2016 Sentul ARRC round
Formula BMW	1:32.040	Rio Haryanto	Mygale FB02	2009 Sentul Formula BMW Pacific round
Stock car racing	1:32.316	Ananda Mikola	Speedcar V8	2008 Sentul Speedcar round
World SSP	1:32.803	Vittoriano Guareschi	Yamaha YZF600R	1997 Sentul Supersport World Series round
125cc	1:34.044	Valentino Rossi	Aprilia RS125	1997 Indonesian motorcycle Grand Prix
Asia Production 250	1:42.350	Rheza Danica Ahrens	Honda CBR250RR	2018 Sentul ARRC round
Asia Underbone 150	1:49.304	Muhammad Agung Fachrul	Yamaha T-150	2018 Sentul ARRC round

== Events ==
Current

- April: Indonesia Sentul Series of Motorsport
- May: Indonesia Sentul Series of Motorsport
- July: Indonesia Sentul Series of Motorsport
- August: Indonesia Sentul Series of Motorsport
- October: Indonesia Sentul Series of Motorsport
- November: Indonesia Sentul Series of Motorsport

Former

- A1 Grand Prix (2 times in 2006)
- Asia Road Racing Championship (1996–2000, 2002–2018)
- Asia Talent Cup (2014)
- Asian Formula Three Championship (2004–2005, 2007)
- Asian Touring Car Championship (2006–2009, 2011)
- Formula 4 South East Asia Championship (2016)
- Formula Asia (1996–1997)
- Formula BMW Asia (2006–2009, 2011)
- Formula V6 Asia (2006–2008)
- GP2 Asia Series (2008)
- Grand Prix motorcycle racing
  - Indonesian motorcycle Grand Prix (1996–1997)
- Indonesian Grand Prix (1993)
- Lamborghini Super Trofeo Asia (2014–2015)
- Oneprix (2007)
- Pertamina 6 Hours Endurance (2024)
- Porsche Carrera Cup Asia (2006–2009)
- Speedcar Series (2008)
- Superbike World Championship (1994–1997)
- Supersport World Series (1997)

== Events winners ==
=== Indonesian motorcycle Grand Prix ===
Season	Winner 500cc	Winner 250cc	Winner 125cc	Report
1996	(Australia) Mick Doohan	(Japan) Tetsuya Harada	(Japan) Masaki Tokudome	Report
1997	(Japan) Tadayuki Okada	(Italy) Max Biaggi	(Italy) Valentino Rossi	Report

=== Superbike World Championship ===
Season	Race 1	Race 2	Report
1994	(United Kingdom) Jamie Whitham	(United Kingdom) Carl Fogarty	Report
1995	(United Kingdom) Carl Fogarty	(New Zealand) Aaron Slight	Report
1996	(United States) John Kocinski	(United States) John Kocinski	Report
1997	(United States) John Kocinski	(United Kingdom) Carl Fogarty	Report

=== A1 Grand Prix ===
Season	Sprint Race Winner	Feature Race Winner	Report
2005–06	(France) Nicolas Lapierre	(Canada) Sean McIntosh	Report
2006–07	(New Zealand) Jonny Reid	(New Zealand) Jonny Reid	Report

=== GP2 Asia ===
Season	Race 1 Winner	Race 2 Winner	Report
2008	(Switzerland) Sébastien Buemi	(Malaysia) Fairuz Fauzy	Report

=== Speedcar Series ===
Season	Race 1 Winner	Race 2 Winner	Report
2008	(France) Jean Alesi	(Germany) Uwe Alzen	Report

=== Asian Formula 3 ===
Series 2005

Round	Race winner	Fastest lap
10	(Philippines) Tyson Sy	(Philippines) Tyson Sy (1'24.594)
9	(Philippines) Tyson Sy	(Philippines) Tyson Sy (1'24.791)
8	(Indonesia) Ananda Mikola	(Republic of Ireland) John O'Hara (1'25.092)
7	(Republic of Ireland) John O'Hara	(Republic of Ireland) John O'Hara (1'25.221)

Series 2006

Round	Race winner	Fastest lap
15	Cancelled	Cancelled
14	(United Kingdom) James Winslow	(United Kingdom) Alistair Jackson (1'25.929)
13	(United Kingdom) James Winslow	(United Kingdom) James Winslow (1'26.011)
12	(United Kingdom) James Winslow	(United Kingdom) James Winslow (1'26.447)
11	(United Kingdom) James Winslow	(United Kingdom) James Winslow (1'26.179)
10	(United Kingdom) James Winslow	(United Kingdom) James Winslow (1'26.167)

== Fatalities ==
- Iqbal Hakeem - 2019 Private Test.
- Kevin Safaruddin Madria - 2022 Idemitsu bLU CRu Yamaha Sunday Race.

== See also ==
- List of motor racing tracks
