= Sauber C31 =

Formula One racing car

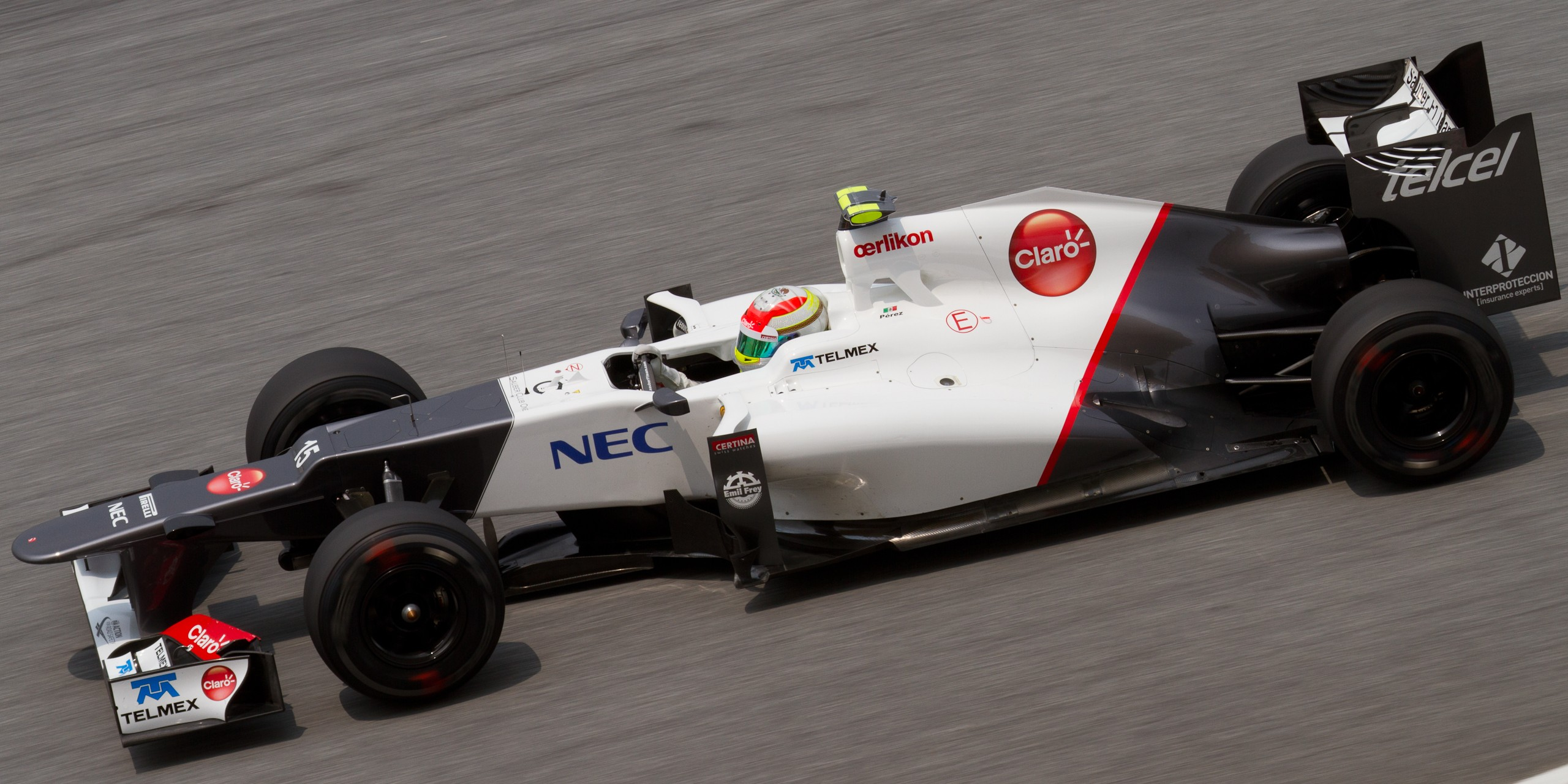
- Sergio Pérez driving the C31 at the 2012 Malaysian Grand Prix
- Category: Formula One
- Constructor: Sauber
- Designers: James Key (Technical Director); Matt Morris (Chief Designer); Pierre Waché (Head of Vehicle Performance); Willem Toet (Head of Aerodynamics); Seamus Mullarkey (Head of Aerodynamic Research); Mariano Alperin (Head of Aerodynamic Development)
- Predecessor: Sauber C30
- Successor: Sauber C32

Technical specifications
- Chassis: Carbon-fibre monocoque
- Suspension (front): Upper and lower wishbones, inboard springs and dampers (SRE) actuated by pushrods
- Suspension (rear): Upper and lower wishbones, inboard springs and dampers (SRE) actuated by pullrods
- Engine: Ferrari 056 2,398 ccm mid-mounted
- Transmission: Ferrari 7-speed Quick-shift carbon gearbox, longitudinally mounted, carbon-fibre clutch
- Weight: 640 kg (incl. driver, tank empty)
- Fuel: Shell V-Power ULG-66L/2
- Tyres: Pirelli P Zero (dry), Cinturato (wet)

Competition history
- Notable entrants: Sauber F1 Team
- Notable drivers: 14. (Japan) Kamui Kobayashi; 15. (Mexico) Sergio Pérez
- Debut: 2012 Australian Grand Prix
- Last event: 2012 Brazilian Grand Prix
Races	Wins	Podiums	Poles	F/Laps
20	0	4	0	2

The Sauber C31 was a Formula One racing car designed by Sauber for use in the 2012 Formula One World Championship. The car was driven by Japanese Kamui Kobayashi and Mexican Sergio Pérez, in their third and second seasons with the team respectively. Technical director James Key announced that he was leaving the team just four days before the C31 was due to be launched at Jerez de la Frontera.

The chassis was designed by James Key, Matt Morris, Pierre Waché and Willem Toet with the car being powered with a customer Ferrari engine.

== Season review ==
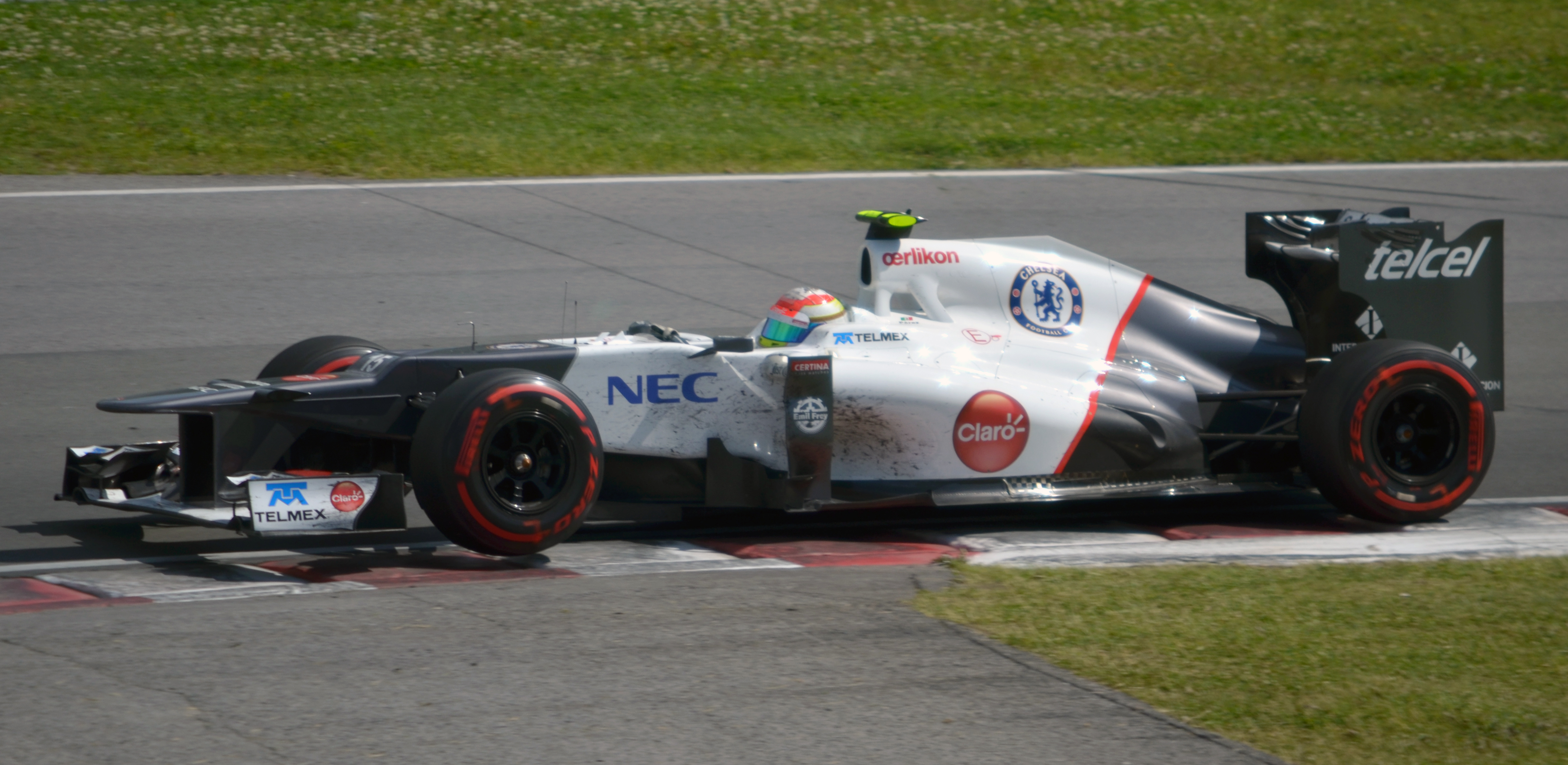
Pérez during the Canadian Grand Prix.

The C31 achieved its first podium, with Pérez behind the wheel, at the Malaysian Grand Prix.

On June 10, Pérez achieved his second podium of the season at the Canadian Grand Prix with third place, while Kobayashi added a ninth place to help Sauber move up to sixth place in the Constructors' Championship.

For the German Grand Prix the C31 achieved its best points haul of the season with Kobayashi coming in fifth position before a penalty pushed him up into fourth, with Pérez following him home in sixth, giving the team 20 points in one round. This was their best scoring round since returning to Formula One as a privateer team.

At the Belgian GP Kobayashi started second and Pérez fourth (the best grid positions in Sauber's history). At the start of the race, Romain Grosjean caused a spectacular crash taking himself, Pérez, championship leader Fernando Alonso and Lewis Hamilton out of action. Kobayashi's Sauber was also damaged in the incident which knocked him right down the field and he finished the race in 13th place.

The Italian GP turned out to be a great weekend for the Sauber F1 team and they scored 20 points. Pérez scored second place (his third podium of the season), and Kobayashi ninth. Pérez had a strong race, overtaking drivers like Schumacher, Räikkönen, Rosberg, Massa and Alonso. The Sauber team had a great strategy with Pérez's car, starting on hard tyres and changing it to medium compound tyres by lap 30 of 53 (the opposite strategy to those who started at the front of the grid). Kobayashi started in 8th place and finished in 9th, scoring two points.

Conclusion

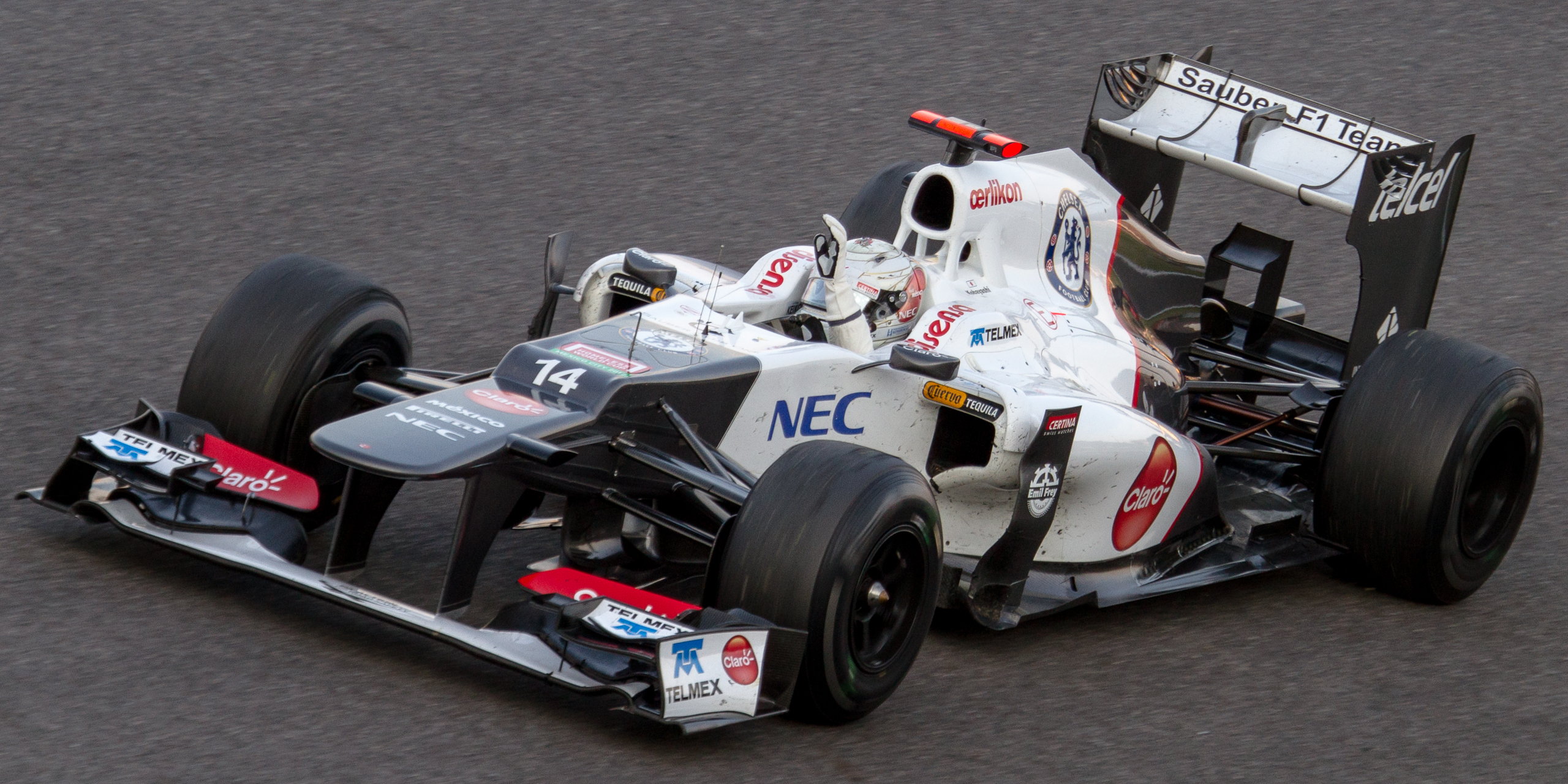
Kamui Kobayashi celebrates his podium finish in front of the home crowd at the Japanese Grand Prix

The Sauber C31 finished the 2012 season in sixth place with 126 points (as much as a private team since 1993), two fastest laps (China and Monaco), four podiums (Malaysia, Canada, Italy and Japan) and 13 Q3. The car proved to be fast and very competitive, though inconsistent to find the set-up in some circuits and, above all, at the time of the race qualifications.

Use in testing The Sauber C31 has been used to test young drivers by the team. Former IndyCar Series driver Simona de Silvestro tested the C31 during her time with the team. She drove the car at the Fiorano Circuit, owned by engine supplier Ferrari and used by them to test. The car has also been used by the team to test young drivers Adderly Fong and Roy Nissany in a two-day test at the Circuit Ricardo Tormo. The car completed 99 laps at the circuit on both days with Fong driving on day one and Nissany driving on day two.

== Sponsorship and livery ==
Unlike previous cars such as the Sauber C29 and to a lesser extent, the C30, the C31 has much more visual sponsorship applied to the car such as Claro, Telcel, Telmex, Tequila Cuervo, Visit México, Oerlikon, NEC and Certina. Many of which are Mexican based companies brought from driver Sergio Pérez and reserve driver Esteban Gutiérrez.

At the Chinese and Bahrain Grands Prix, the cars featured the phrases "Out of the Blue" and "True Blue" on their engine covers. From the Spanish Grand Prix onwards, the Chelsea FC logo appeared on the nose cone and engine cover of the cars. At the Italian, Singapore, Japanese, and Korean Grands Prix, the logos for the Homeless World Cup Mexico City 2012 were visible on the car's nose cone.

The José Cuervo ad was for Cuervo Tequila except for Bahrain and Abu Dhabi, where their Cholula Hot Sauce replaced the drink because of prohibitions on alcohol advertising.

== Complete Formula One results ==
(key) (results in bold indicate pole position; results in italics indicate fastest lap)

Year	Entrant	Engine	Tyres	Drivers	1	2	3	4	5	6	7	8	9	10	11	12	13	14	15	16	17	18	19	20	Points	WCC
2012	Sauber F1 Team	Ferrari Type 056	**P**		AUS	MAL	CHN	BHR	ESP	MON	CAN	EUR	GBR	GER	HUN	BEL	ITA	SIN	JPN	KOR	IND	ABU	USA	BRA	126	6th
2012	Sauber F1 Team	Ferrari Type 056	**P**	(Japan) Kamui Kobayashi	6	Ret	10	13	5	Ret	9	Ret	11	4	18^{†}	13	9	13	3	Ret	14	6	14	9	126	6th
2012	Sauber F1 Team	Ferrari Type 056	**P**	(Mexico) Sergio Pérez	8	2	11	11	Ret	11	3	9	Ret	6	14	Ret	2	10	Ret	11	Ret	15	11	Ret	126	6th

^{†} Driver failed to finish, but was classified as they had completed over 90% of the race distance.
