= Sauber C30 =

Formula One racing car

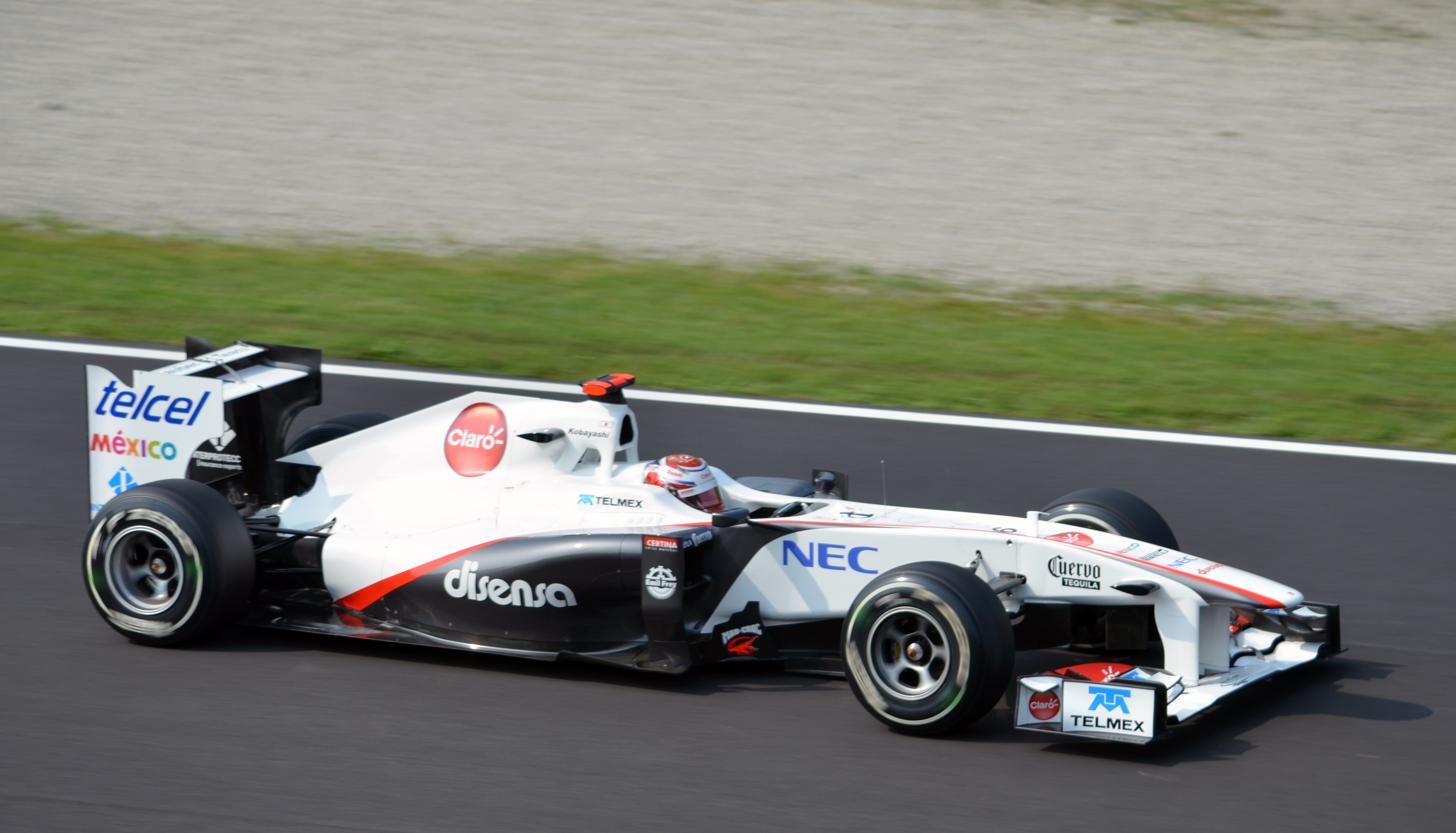
- Kamui Kobayashi driving the C30 at the 2011 Italian Grand Prix
- Category: Formula One
- Constructor: Sauber
- Designers: James Key (Technical Director); Christoph Zimmermann (Chief Designer); Pierre Waché (Head of Vehicle Performance); Seamus Mullarkey (Head of Aerodynamics); Mariano Alperin (Head of Aerodynamic Development)
- Predecessor: Sauber C29
- Successor: Sauber C31

Technical specifications
- Chassis: carbon-fibre and honeycomb composite monocoque
- Suspension (front): Upper and lower wishbones, inboard springs and dampers, actuated by Sachs pushrods
- Suspension (rear): as front
- Engine: Ferrari Type 056 2,398 cc (146.3 cu in) 90° V8, limited to 18,000 RPM with optional 60 kW (80 hp) KERS naturally aspirated mid-mounted
- Transmission: Seven-speed semi-automatic carbon-fibre sequential gearbox with reverse gear electronically-controlled, quick-shift Limited-slip differential
- Weight: 640 kg (1,411 lb) (including driver)
- Fuel: Shell
- Tyres: Pirelli P Zero; OZ Wheels (front and rear): 13"

Competition history
- Notable entrants: Sauber F1 Team
- Notable drivers: 16. (Japan) Kamui Kobayashi; 17. (Mexico) Sergio Pérez; 17. (Spain) Pedro de la Rosa
- Debut: 2011 Australian Grand Prix
- Last event: 2011 Brazilian Grand Prix
Races	Wins	Podiums	Poles	F/Laps
19	0	0	0	0

The Sauber C30 is a Formula One racing car developed by Sauber Motorsport for use in the 2011 Formula One World Championship. As with the previous year's car, the C29, the C30 was powered by a Ferrari engine, but with added capability to house Ferrari's customer KERS system.

== Overview ==
The chassis was designed by James Key, Christoph Zimmermann, Pierre Waché and Seamus Mullarkey with the car being powered with a customer Ferrari engine.

The car was driven by Kamui Kobayashi and Mexican newcomer Sergio Pérez. The car was unveiled on 31 January 2011 at the Circuit Ricardo Tormo in Valencia, Spain. On the following day, Kobayashi became the first driver to test the car.

== Season review ==
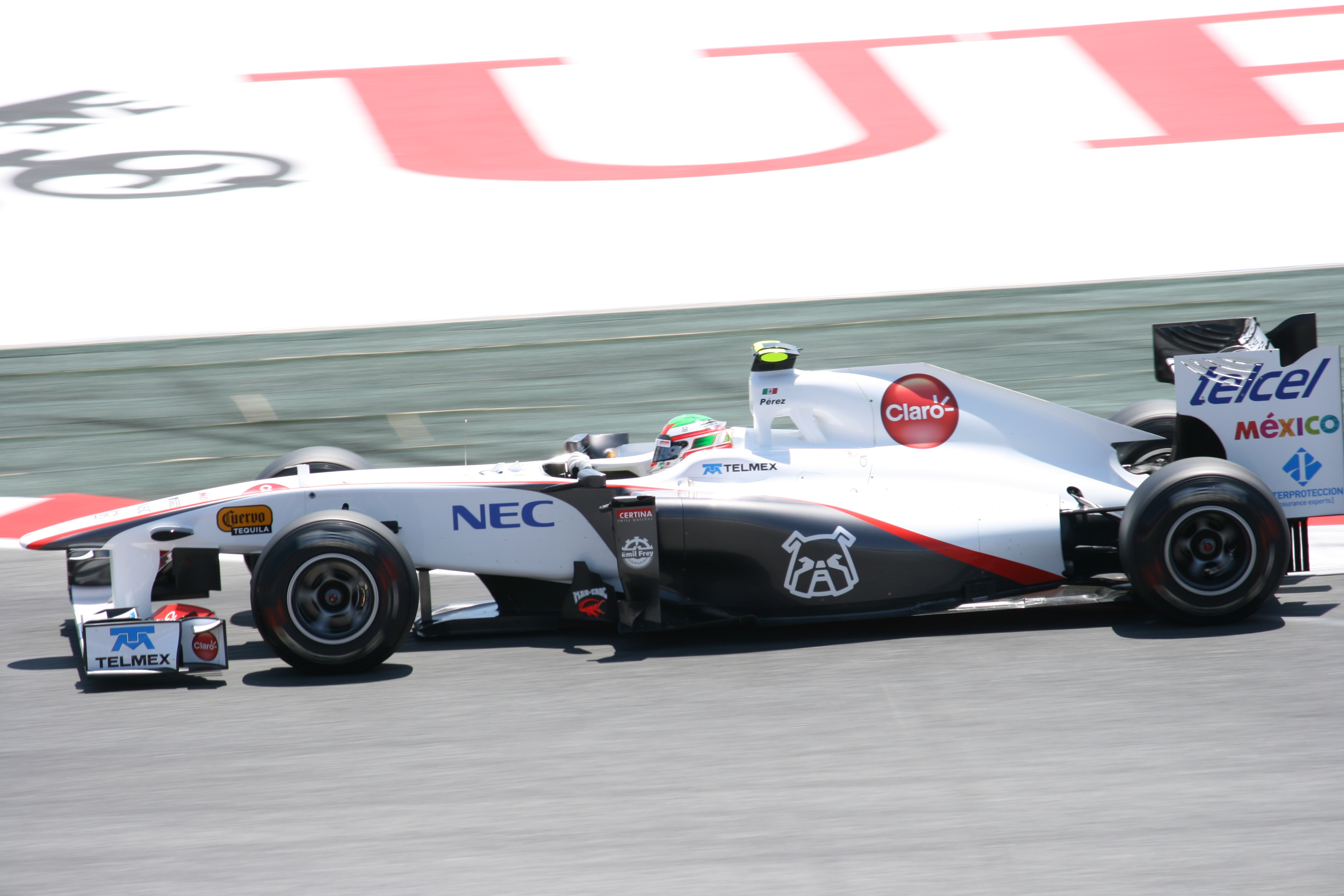
The Sauber C30 cars was disqualified from seventh and eighth place in the 2011 Australian Grand Prix due to a technical infringement on the cars' rear wings.

At the first race in Melbourne, both Pérez and Kobayashi scored points, finishing in 7th and 8th place respectively, scoring a total of 10 points. However, following the discovery of a non-regulation rear wing, both cars were disqualified and their points were redistributed.

Unlike the 2010 C29 the C30 was reliable from the start of the season and developments came at a respectable rate, keeping it easily within the top 10. Kobayashi finished in the top 10 in the first seven races, and amassed 25 points - including a fifth at Monaco, and a seventh in Canada after running in second at the restart. Sergio Pérez was forced to retire in Malaysia when a piece of a Toro Rosso flew off and sliced his car. In the Spanish Grand Prix, Pérez scored his first points, with ninth, and in the next race, he crashed in Q3 in Monaco, injuring him badly enough so that he had to miss the Monaco and subsequent Canadian Grand Prix where former Sauber driver Pedro de la Rosa took his seat and finished twelfth.

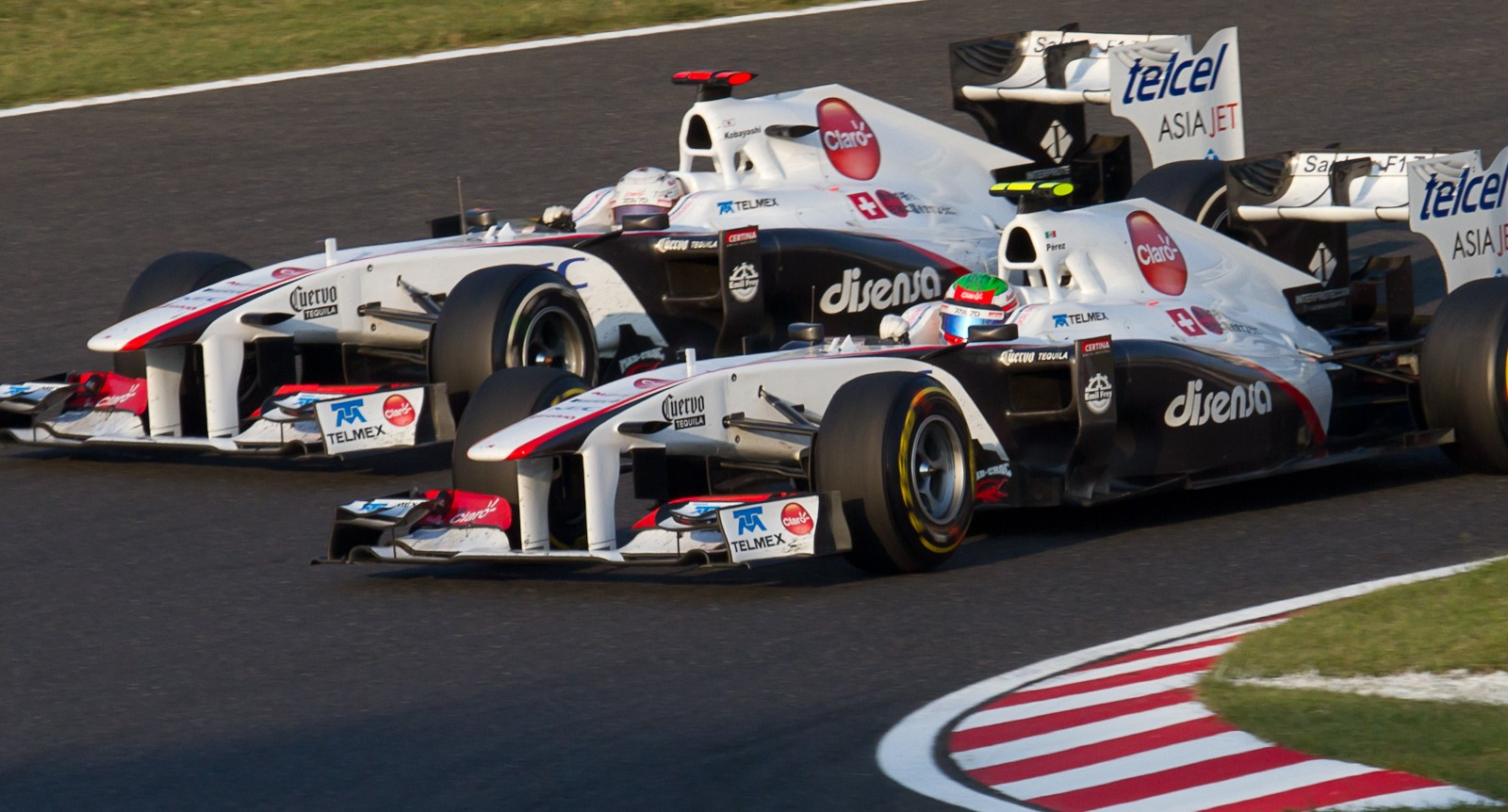
Pérez (right) and Kobayashi (left) at the Japanese Grand Prix

The next ten races were not so successful for Kobayashi only having one points finish - in Germany. Pérez scored his best race result, in Britain, finishing seventh; before he was robbed of an equal result in Monza where both cars retired with gearbox failures. This put Force India ahead of them in the Constructors' Championship, into sixth place. Pérez got back into the points in Singapore, with tenth place, but this was nothing compared to the twelve points Force India scored at that race. At the Japanese Grand Prix Kobayashi impressed his home fans by going fastest in Q1 and qualifying a career best seventh. When Kobayashi had a not so successful race, Pérez made advantage of making one less pit stop, finishing an impressive eighth. Kobayashi re-captured his form when he finished the last two races in a points scoring finish, tenth in Abu Dhabi and 9th in Brazil. In total, they accumulated the same number of points as the previous season's Sauber C29.

== Sponsorship and livery ==
After running a near-blank livery in 2010, the team has acquired several sponsors including Jose Cuervo, an investment from Telmex owner Carlos Slim and other Mexican related sponsors; Claro and Telcel. Some 2010 sponsors including Mad Croc Energy, have returned.

In Australia, the team paid tribute to the Tōhoku earthquake and tsunami with a Swiss and a Japanese flag on the engine cover. It reappeared in Japan.

At the Turkish, Spanish, Monaco and Candada Grands Prix, the team replaced the logo of the Mexican construction brand Disensa normally found on the car’s sidepod with a dog’s head representing the Mexican cement brand Apasco. At the Indian Grand Prix, the Amul logo was seen on the car's rear wing.

The José Cuervo ad was for Cuervo Tequila except for Turkish, Indian and Abu Dhabi, where their Cholula Hot Sauce replaced the drink because of prohibitions on alcohol advertising.

== Continued use after Formula One ==
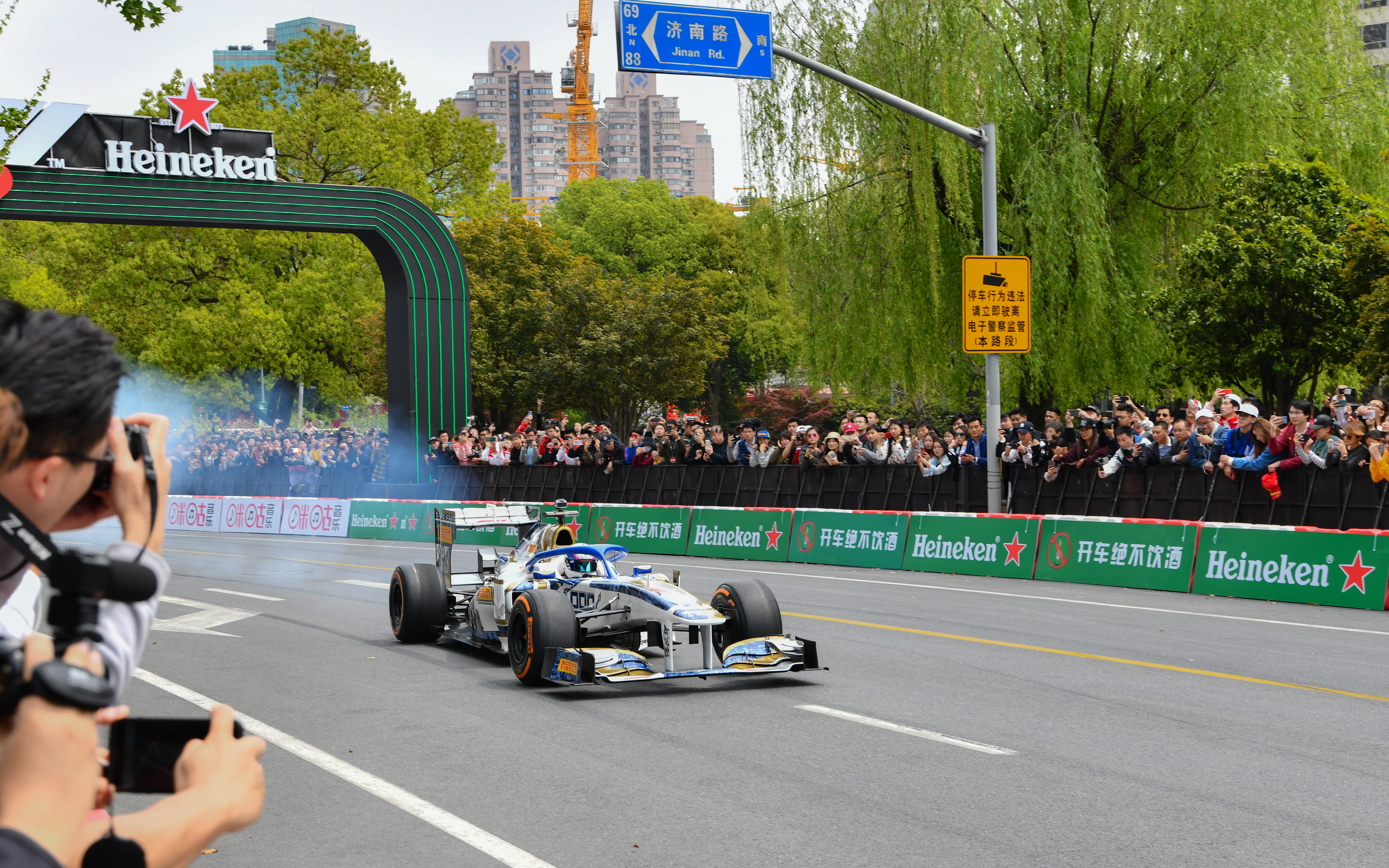
The HF1-018 with special livery driven by Jessica Hawkins during F1 Shanghai Festival

The Sauber C30 forms the basis of the Heritage F1 HF1-018 which uses the Sauber designed C30 chassis, front suspension and aerodynamic devices. The HF1-018 is advertised as the fastest track day car in the world and is powered by a small capacity turbo charged engine similar to that used in the 2014 onwards Formula One championship but does not use a KERS system as the original C30 did. According to the Heritage F1 website the HF1-018 was constructed by the UK based motorsport engineering company TDF.

The HF1-018 made its debut in May 2018 at Circuit Zolder as part of a FORCE F1 demonstration. The car has since featured in numerous television adverts, press adverts and F1 demonstrations, most recently at the 2018 Silverstone Classic where it was driven by Oliver Webb and Jessica Hawkins. In June 2018, Billy Monger drove a Formula One racing car for the first time when he tested the HF1-018 at the Rockingham Motor Speedway in Corby. The car had been specially converted to match the hand controls present in the Carlin BRDC British Formula 3 car he races. A documentary feature about Monger's first Formula One drive was shown as part of Sky F1's coverage of the 2018 Austrian Grand Prix. During the 2019 Chinese Grand Prix race weekend, Jessica Hawkins drove a special livery HF1-018 (also known as F1-1000, to celebrate the 1000th F1 championship race) as a part of the F1 Shanghai Festival 2019 - F1 live roadshow.

== Complete Formula One results ==
(key) (results in bold indicate pole position; results in italics indicate fastest lap)

Year	Entrant	Engine	Tyres	Drivers	1	2	3	4	5	6	7	8	9	10	11	12	13	14	15	16	17	18	19	Points	WCC
2011	Sauber F1 Team	Ferrari 056 V8	**P**		AUS	MAL	CHN	TUR	ESP	MON	CAN	EUR	GBR	GER	HUN	BEL	ITA	SIN	JPN	KOR	IND	ABU	BRA	44	7th
2011	Sauber F1 Team	Ferrari 056 V8	**P**	(Japan) Kamui Kobayashi	DSQ	7	10	10	10	5	7	16	Ret	9	11	12	Ret	14	13	15	Ret	10	9	44	7th
2011	Sauber F1 Team	Ferrari 056 V8	**P**	(Mexico) Sergio Pérez	DSQ	Ret	17	14	9	DNS	PO	11	7	11	15	Ret	Ret	10	8	16	10	11	13	44	7th
2011	Sauber F1 Team	Ferrari 056 V8	**P**	(Spain) Pedro de la Rosa							12													44	7th
