= Sauber C29 =

2010 Formula One racing car

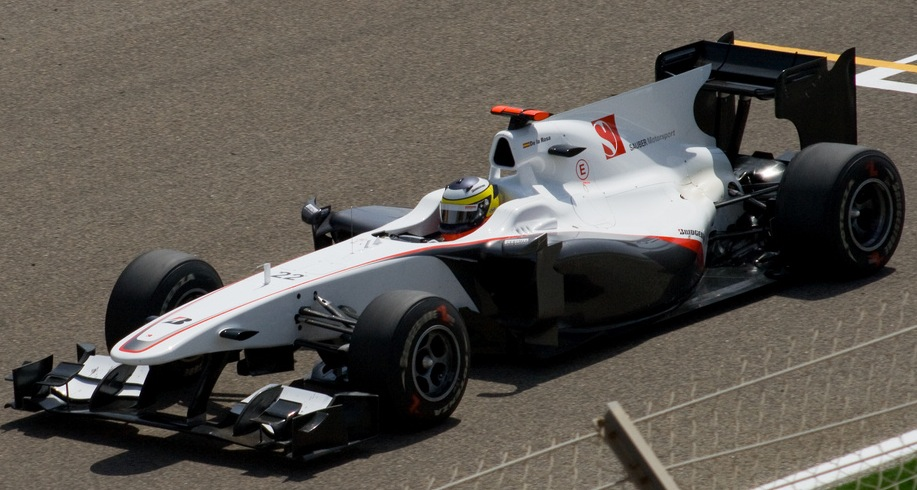
- Pedro de La Rosa driving the C29 at the Bahrain Grand Prix
- Category: Formula One
- Constructor: BMW Sauber
- Designers: Willy Rampf (Technical Director); Christoph Zimmermann (Chief Designer); Pierre Waché (Head of Vehicle Performance); Seamus Mullarkey (Head of Aerodynamics); Mariano Alperin (Head of Aerodynamic Development)
- Predecessor: BMW Sauber F1.09
- Successor: Sauber C30

Technical specifications
- Chassis: carbon-fibre and honeycomb composite monocoque
- Suspension (front): Upper and lower wishbones, inboard springs and dampers, actuated by pushrods
- Suspension (rear): as front
- Engine: Ferrari Type 056 2,400 cc (146.5 cu in) 90° V8, limited to 18,000 RPM naturally aspirated mid-mounted
- Transmission: Seven-speed semi-automatic carbon-fibre sequential gearbox with reverse gear electronically controlled, quick-shift Limited-slip differential
- Weight: 620 kg (1,367 lb) (including driver)
- Fuel: Shell
- Tyres: Bridgestone Potenza; OZ Wheels (front and rear): 13"

Competition history
- Notable entrants: BMW Sauber F1 Team
- Notable drivers: 22. (Spain) Pedro de la Rosa; 22. (Germany) Nick Heidfeld; 23. (Japan) Kamui Kobayashi
- Debut: 2010 Bahrain Grand Prix
- Last event: 2010 Abu Dhabi Grand Prix
Races	Wins	Podiums	Poles	F/Laps
19	0	0	0	0

The Sauber C29 (also known as BMW Sauber C29) was a Formula One racing car which was used by the BMW Sauber F1 Team in the 2010 Formula One season. It was unveiled on January 31, at Circuit Ricardo Tormo in Valencia.

This was the first Sauber Formula One car that uses fully fledged Ferrari engines since the Petronas-badged C24 in 2005.

== Design ==
The chassis was designed by Willy Rampf, Christoph Zimmermann, Pierre Waché and Seamus Mullarkey with the car being powered with a customer Ferrari engine.

In Australia, Sauber announced plans to run their car with an F-duct system, similar to the version used on the McLaren MP4-25, in the free practice sessions.

== Racing history ==
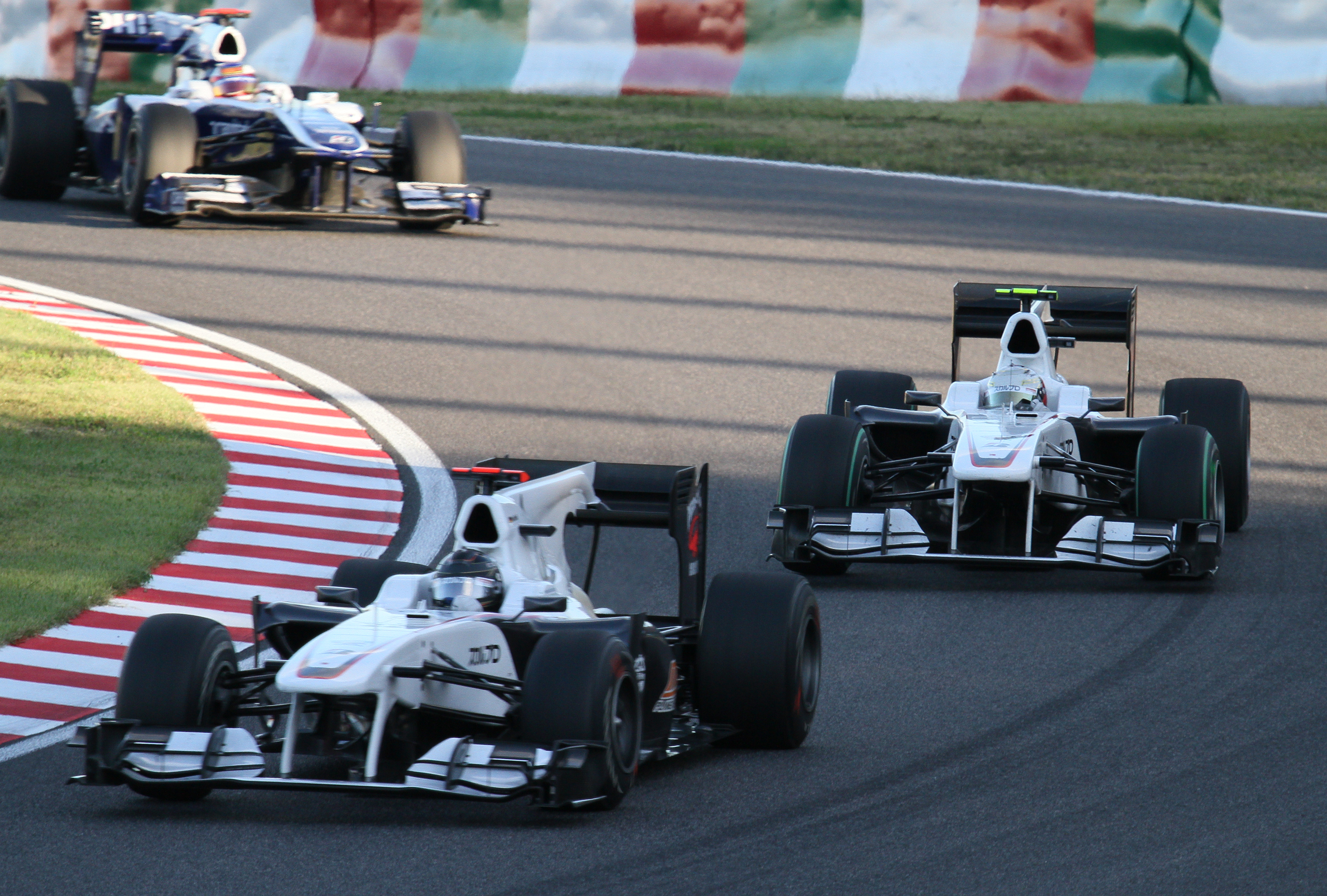
Heidfeld leads teammate Kobayashi at the Japanese Grand Prix, where the former finished eighth and the latter in seventh.

In the early part of the season, the car demonstrated very poor reliability and it was not until the seventh round of the year that the team scored a point with Kamui Kobayashi taking 10th in Turkey. In the second half of the year, the car gradually improved to a very respectable level and the team finished the season with 44 points, taking eighth in the Constructors' Championship.

== Sponsorship and livery ==
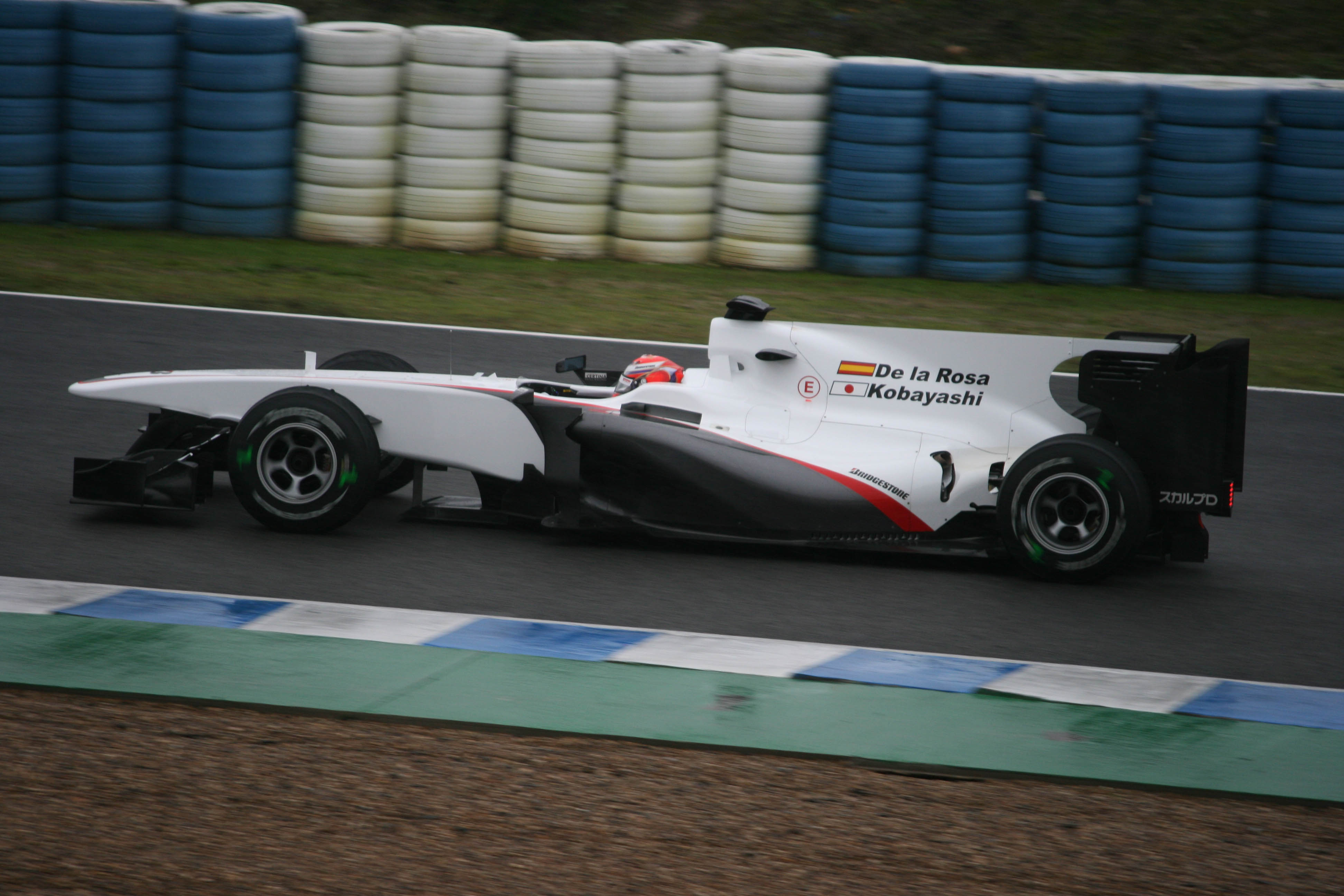
Kobayashi driving the C29 with the sponsorless livery during the pre-season testing in Jerez.

With a lack of main sponsors, the C29 sported the team's colours and the drivers' names and flags during its launch and first test. In the third test session they moved the names and wrote the message "See you in Bahrain March 12–14" on the car's engine cover. At the start of 2010, the car had no sponsors, only the driver's name and nationality on the bodywork. Later on the team featured the team’s logo on the engine cover until the Canadian Grand Prix when the team decided to change it with C1 logo. Another special logo was created at the German and Hungarian Grands Prix which featured; Sauber Motorsport 40th Anniversary.

The team only featured Bridgestone, スカルプ D ("Scalp D") and also Certina logos in the C29 car until the Monaco Grand Prix when the team put a new sponsor; Emil Frey. The team then got several sponsor; Burger King which featured in the Spanish, European and Belgian Grands Prix; Mad Croc Energy Drink from the Belgian Grand Prix onwards; Planex Group and Kinshukai Group in the Japanese Grand Prix.

Other sponsors were Takata, Onegai My Melody, Mitsubishi Electric and Converse.

At the Hungarian Grand Prix, Sauber celebrated its 300th Grand Prix, including its appearance under the BMW Sauber name from 2006 to 2009.

== Complete Formula One results ==
(key) (results in bold indicate pole position; results in italics indicate fastest lap)

Year	Entrant	Engine	Tyres	Drivers	1 BHR	2 AUS	3 MAL	4 CHN	5 ESP	6 MON	7 TUR	8 CAN	9 EUR	10 GBR	11 GER	12 HUN	13 BEL	14 ITA	15 SIN	16 JPN	17 KOR	18 BRA	19 ABU	Points	WCC
2010	BMW Sauber F1 Team	Ferrari 056 V8	**B**	(Spain) Pedro de la Rosa	Ret	12	DNS	Ret	Ret	Ret	11	Ret	12	Ret	14	7	11	14						44	8th
2010	BMW Sauber F1 Team	Ferrari 056 V8	**B**	(Germany) Nick Heidfeld															Ret	8	9	17	11	44	8th
2010	BMW Sauber F1 Team	Ferrari 056 V8	**B**	(Japan) Kamui Kobayashi	Ret	Ret	Ret	Ret	12	Ret	10	Ret	7	6	11	9	8	Ret	Ret	7	8	10	14	44	8th
