= Kamui Kobayashi =

Japanese racing driver (born 1986)

- 小林 可夢偉
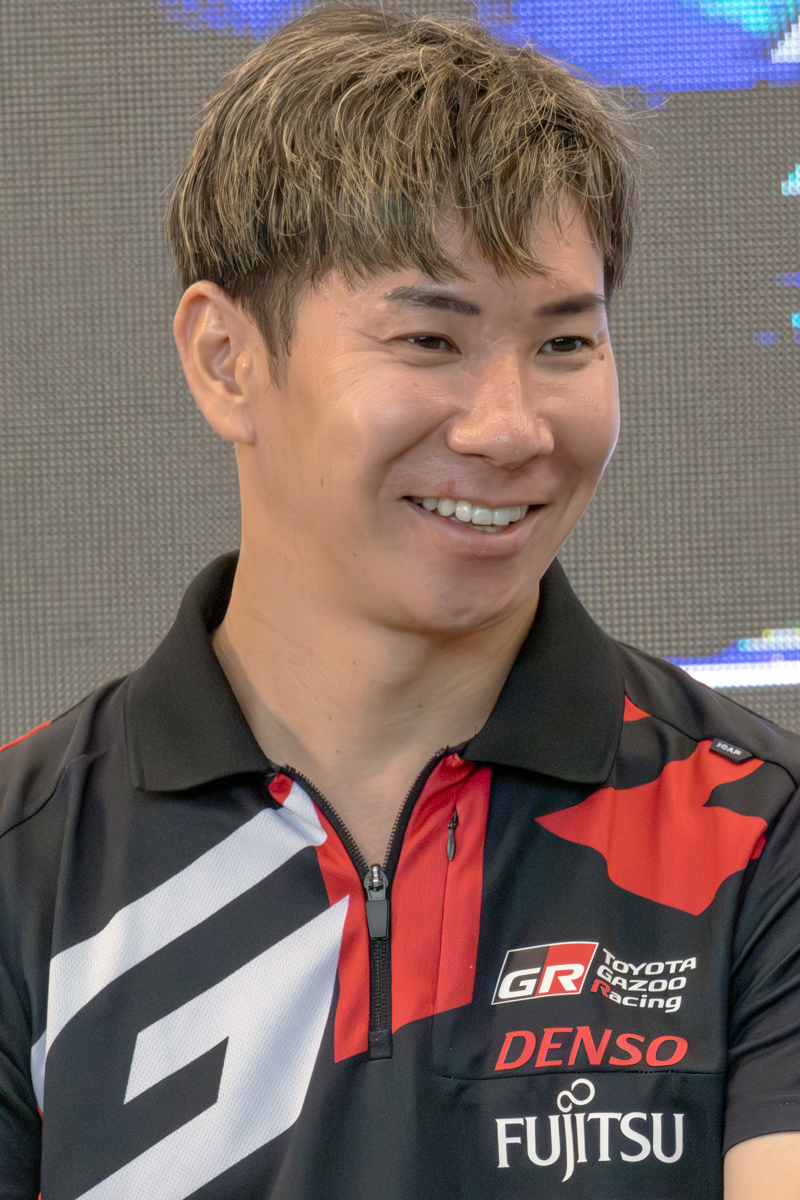
- Kobayashi at the 2024 6 Hours of Fuji
- Born: 13 September 1986 (age 40); Amagasaki, Hyōgo, Japan
- Employers: FIA WEC; Toyota (2022–present)
- Title: Team Principal

FIA World Endurance Championship career
- Debut season: 2013
- Current team: Toyota
- Categorisation: FIA Platinum
- Former teams: AF Corse
- Starts: 85
- Championships: 2 (2019–20, 2021)
- Wins: 19
- Podiums: 50
- Poles: 21
- Fastest laps: 15
- Best finish: 1st in 2019–20 (LMP1), 2021 (LMH)

Formula One World Championship career
- Nationality: (Japan) Japanese
- Active years: 2009–2012, 2014
- Team(s): Toyota, BMW Sauber, Sauber, Caterham
- Car number: 10
- Entries: 76 (75 starts)
- Championships: 0
- Wins: 0
- Podiums: 1
- Career points: 125
- Pole positions: 0
- Fastest laps: 1
- First entry: 2009 Brazilian Grand Prix
- Last entry: 2014 Abu Dhabi Grand Prix

Super Formula career
- Debut season: 2011
- Current team: TGMGP
- Car number: 7
- Former teams: KCMG, Le Mans
- Starts: 87
- Wins: 0
- Podiums: 7
- Poles: 0
- Fastest laps: 9
- Best finish: 6th in 2015, 2019

24 Hours of Le Mans career
- Years: 2013, 2016–2026
- Teams: AF Corse, Toyota
- Best finish: 1st (2021, 2026)
- Class wins: 2 (2021, 2026)

Previous series
- 2019–2022; 2017–2018; 2017; 2008–2009; 2008–2009; 2006–2007; 2005; 2004–2005; 2004; 2003: IMSA SportsCar; Super GT; Formula E; GP2 Series; GP2 Asia Series; F3 Euro Series; Formula Renault Eurocup; Italian Formula Renault; Asian Formula Renault; Formula Toyota

Championship titles
- 2008–09; 2005; 2005: GP2 Asia Series; Formula Renault Eurocup; Italian Formula Renault

Kamui Kobayashi (Japanese: 小林 可夢偉, Hepburn: Kobayashi Kamui; born 13 September 1986) is a Japanese racing driver and motorsport executive who competes in the FIA World Endurance Championship for Toyota and in Super Formula for TGMGP. Kobayashi competed in Formula One from 2009 to 2014. In endurance racing, Kobayashi has won two FIA World Endurance Championship titles and is a two-time winner of the 24 Hours of Le Mans in 2021 and 2026, all with Toyota. He is also a two-time winner of the 24 Hours of Daytona in 2019 and 2020 with WTR. Since 2022, Kobayashi has served as team principal of Toyota in WEC, winning three consecutive World Manufacturers' Championship titles from 2022 to 2024.

Kobayashi also serves as team principal for Toyota Gazoo Racing Europe for their FIA World Endurance Championship team. Kobayashi previously competed in Formula One, Formula E, the GP2 Series, and the GP2 Asia Series. He became champion of the FIA World Endurance Championship alongside co-drivers Mike Conway and José María López in the 2019–20 season and in 2021, where he also won the 2021 24 Hours of Le Mans.

Kobayashi is the third FIA world champion from Japan after Toshi Arai and Kazuki Nakajima, and became the third Asian-born driver after countrymen Aguri Suzuki and Takuma Satō to score a Formula One podium finish, doing so at the 2012 Japanese Grand Prix for Sauber.

== Junior single-seater career ==
=== Early years ===
Kobayashi was born in Amagasaki in Hyōgo Prefecture, near Kobe. His father owns a sushi restaurant. He began his career in motorsport in 1996 when he was nine years old, finishing third in his first season of karting in the SL Takarazuka Tournament Cadet Class. During the following seven years, Kobayashi took four karting titles, winning the Toyota SL All Japan Tournament Cadet Class series twice.

In 2004, Kobayashi signed for Toyota's Driver Academy and soon began his career in open wheel racing. His next step was Formula Renault, entering the Asian, German, Italian and Dutch championships and taking two race victories in the Italian championship. Kobayashi continued in the Formula Renault class, entering the Italian and European championships and with six wins in both championships, he won both titles.

In 2006, Kobayashi entered the Formula 3 Euro Series with ASM Formule 3 alongside Paul di Resta, Giedo van der Garde and Sebastian Vettel. He took three podium positions in his debut season, coming eighth in the Drivers' Championship and first in the Rookie's Championship. Kobayashi also entered the Macau Grand Prix and the Masters of Formula 3, which are annual Formula Three events. Kobayashi started in tenth place and finished the race a place lower in 11th, while at the Macau Grand Prix, he started the race in pole position but finished in 19th place.

At the beginning of 2007, Kobayashi, along with Kōhei Hirate, was named as one of the Toyota Formula One team's test drivers. He stayed in the Euro Series for the upcoming season and had an impressive start, taking two podiums in the first four rounds. He achieved his first race victory in Formula 3 at Magny-Cours, in the tenth round, a support race for the Formula One French Grand Prix. Kobayashi finished fourth in the Drivers' Championship.

=== GP2 ===
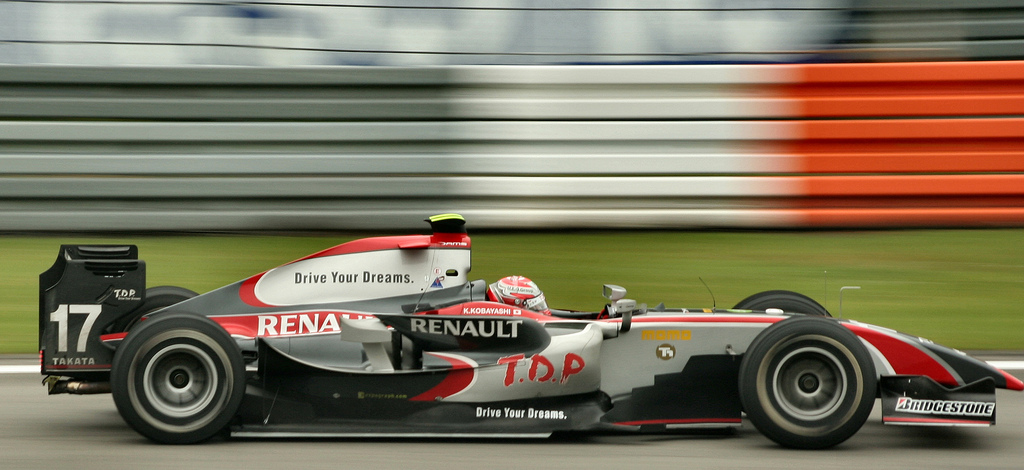
Kobayashi driving for DAMS at the Nürburgring round of the 2009 GP2 Series season

Following a successful GP2 Asia Series campaign in early 2008, Kobayashi won his first GP2 Series race in only the second race of the season. After a strong start from pole in the sprint race at the Circuit de Catalunya, Kobayashi took the chequered flag in first place. This was after a controversial piece of defensive driving from his former Euro Series teammate Romain Grosjean after a safety car period. At the end of the pit straight, Kobayashi attempted a pass on Grosjean. However, the Frenchman moved more than once to defend his position, forcing Kobayashi into evasive action. This resulted in a drive through penalty for the Frenchman, handing the win to Kobayashi. However, he only finished in the points on one further occasion, restricting him to sixteenth in the championship.

Another successful GP2 Asia campaign followed over the winter months of 2008 and 2009, with Kobayashi winning two races en route to the championship, with a round to spare. Kobayashi could not repeat his form in the main series, finishing sixteenth again.

== Formula One (2007–2012) ==
On 16 November 2007, it was confirmed that Kobayashi would replace the departing Franck Montagny as the Toyota F1 team's third driver. He was the team's test and reserve driver during the 2008 and 2009 seasons.

=== Toyota (2009) ===
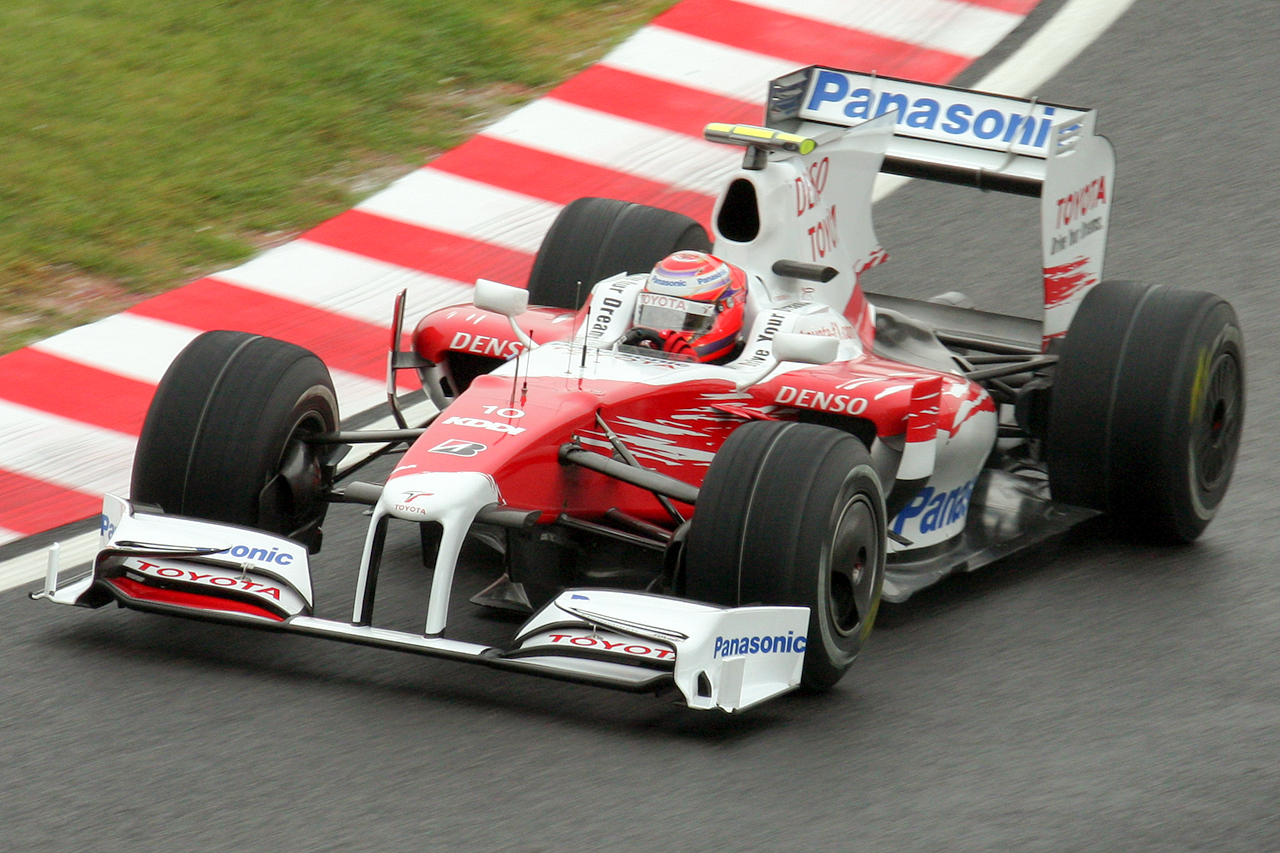
Kobayashi deputising for Timo Glock during practice for the 2009 Japanese Grand Prix

==== 2009 ====
At the 2009 Japanese Grand Prix, Kobayashi competed in the first two free practice sessions in place of Timo Glock, who was ill. Glock recovered in time to take part in the third free practice session and qualifying, but was injured after crashing in the final session and had to miss the race. Toyota asked the Fédération Internationale de l'Automobile (FIA) for permission to run Kobayashi in the race, but this was refused as the regulations state a driver must run in at least one session on Saturday to be eligible to start the race.

Kobayashi made his Formula One debut at the 2009 Brazilian Grand Prix, following a complication to Glock's injury that was initially not detected. He qualified eleventh in a chaotic session that lasted for over two and half hours and was red-flagged twice due to accidents caused by torrential rain. Early in the race, while running in sixth place, he held off for several laps a challenge by Jenson Button, who needed to finish well to clinch the world championship. He finished the race in tenth place, and was later promoted to ninth when Heikki Kovalainen was penalised. Button jokingly described Kobayashi as "absolutely crazy, very aggressive". He also competed in the 2009 Abu Dhabi Grand Prix, as Glock's injury had not healed sufficiently. Kobayashi qualified twelfth and finished sixth, scoring his first World Championship points, in the inaugural day-night race in Abu Dhabi. Before Toyota decided to withdraw from Formula One, Kobayashi was expected to be given a full-time seat at Toyota for the 2010 Formula One Season.

=== Sauber (2010–2012) ===
==== 2010 ====
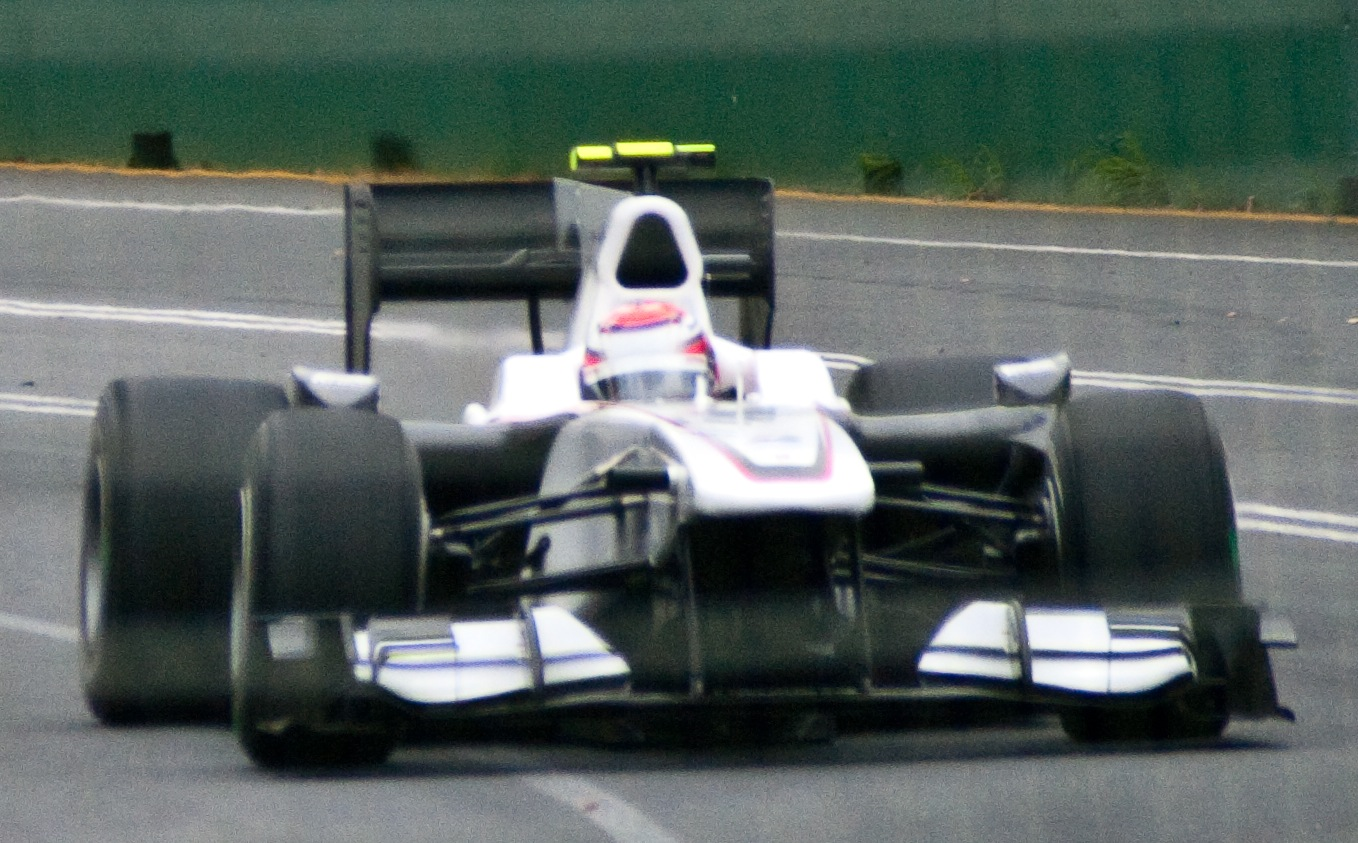
Kobayashi driving for Sauber at the 2010 Australian Grand Prix

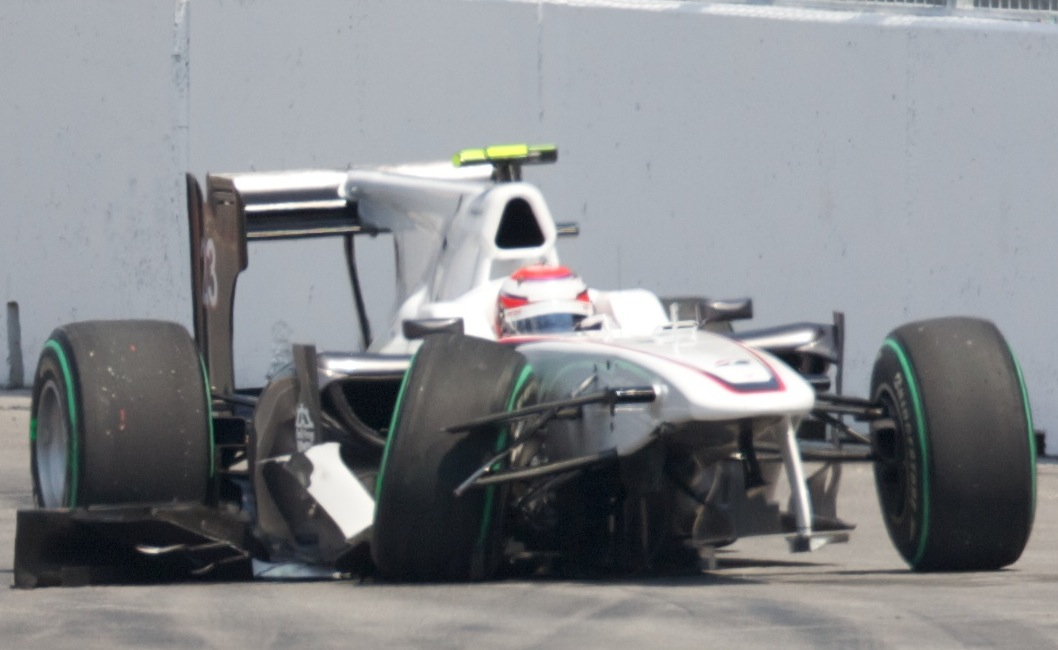
Kobayashi became another victim of the "Wall of Champions" at the 2010 Canadian Grand Prix

Following Toyota's withdrawal, Kobayashi faced an uncertain future, but he was mentioned in lists of probable drivers for the series' new teams for 2010. After weeks of speculation, it was confirmed on 17 December 2009, he would drive for Sauber for the 2010 season. Despite the team having been sold by BMW back to founder Peter Sauber after the 2009 season, and no longer using BMW components, the team was still named BMW Sauber as it had been known for the past four seasons. His teammate was former McLaren tester Pedro de la Rosa. Kobayashi completed his first laps in the new Sauber C29 chassis during F1 winter testing on 2 February.

During the Australian Grand Prix, a front wing failure on his Sauber caused him to hit the barrier, rebounding off it to cause a three-car crash taking out Nico Hülkenberg and Sébastien Buemi. In the next race in Malaysia he qualified in ninth place, his best grid position up to that point, however he suffered an engine failure early in the race. In China, Kobayashi was involved in a three-way collision with Buemi and Vitantonio Liuzzi on the first lap, making him the only driver to retire from the first four races. In Turkey, he won his first points of the season, coming home tenth after being promoted a place due to Vettel's retirement after a collision with teammate Webber and Petrov's puncture. In Valencia, he finished seventh by passing both Fernando Alonso and Sébastien Buemi in the final laps on fresh tyres, after driving the majority of the race in third position on his first set of tyres. He followed that with sixth place in Silverstone, eleventh in Germany, ninth in Hungary and eighth in Belgium.

At the Italian Grand Prix, Kobayashi suffered a gearbox failure and retired from the Singapore Grand Prix after hitting a track-side barrier. Kobayashi's teammate changed in Singapore as Pedro de la Rosa was removed in favour of Nick Heidfeld. In Japan, Kobayashi qualified 14th and finished seventh, passing several drivers along the way including his teammate, in a very impressive fashion. He finished eighth in Korea and tenth in Brazil, eventually finishing the season with 32 points. In his review of the season, former TV commentator Murray Walker stated that Kobayashi is "without a doubt Japan's best [F1 driver] yet". Kobayashi gained a reputation during the season as a highly skilled overtaker, being able to outbrake drivers several car lengths in front of him. His aggressive overtaking style was described by Martin Brundle as, "He gets to the normal braking point and then goes, 'Now, which one is the brake again? That's right, it's on the left,' and he just sails past people!" He qualified well against his more experienced teammates, outqualifying de la Rosa and Heidfeld eleven times to eight over the season.

==== 2011 ====
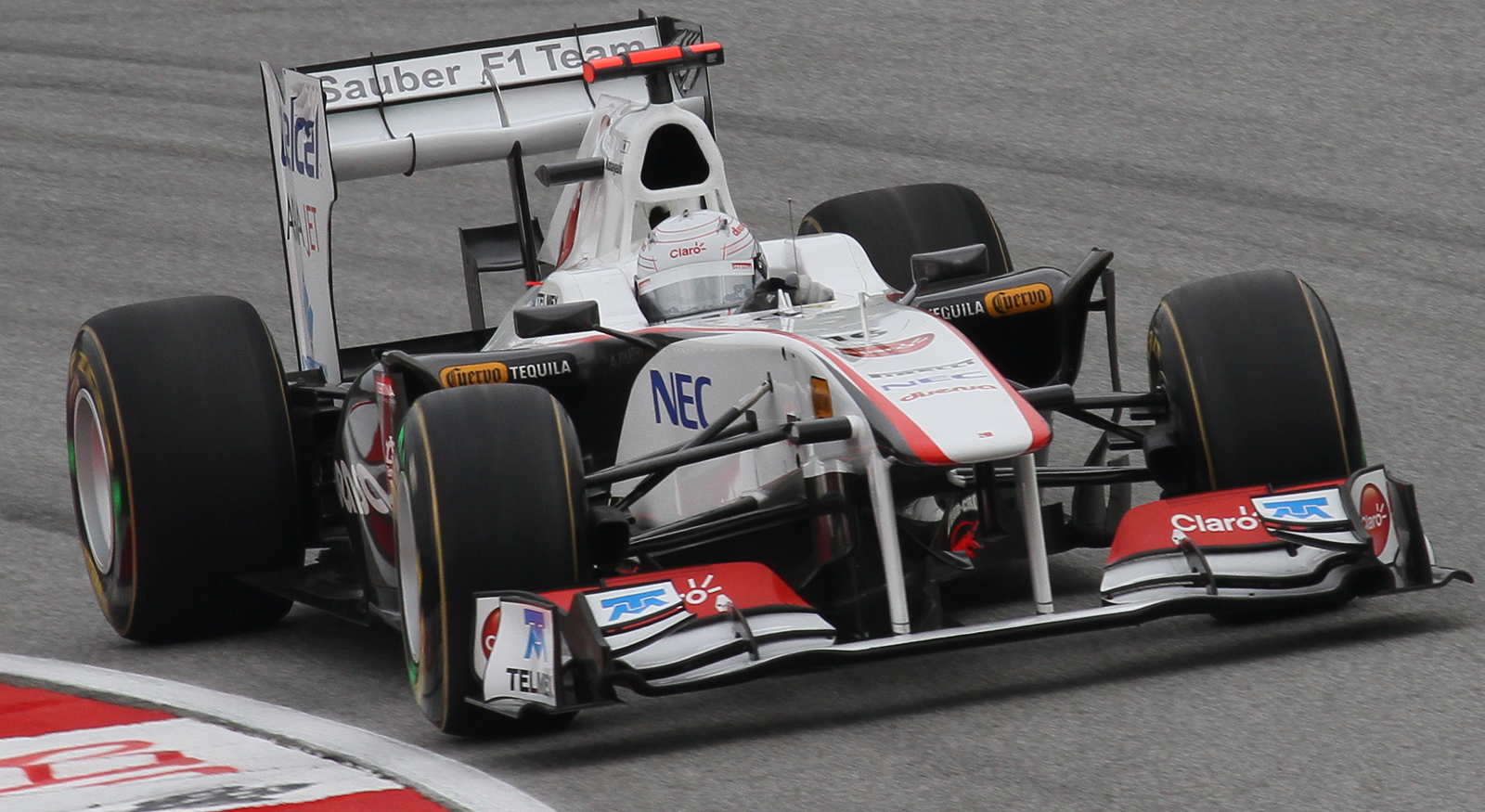
Kobayashi at the 2011 Malaysian Grand Prix

Kobayashi remained with Sauber (renamed from BMW Sauber to Sauber F1 Team) in 2011, where he was partnered by GP2 graduate Sergio Pérez. Kobayashi finished eighth in the season opening Australian Grand Prix, but he and Pérez – who had finished seventh – were disqualified after the race due to an irregularity with the car's rear-wing. The next race of the season in Malaysia was another strong showing for Kobayashi, finishing eighth in the race, eventually classified seventh after Lewis Hamilton received a penalty. He finished tenth in his next three races, before a career-high fifth place in an incident-packed Monaco Grand Prix. In an extremely wet Canadian Grand Prix, Kobayashi worked his way up from thirteenth place to second having not decided to change to extreme wet tyres before the race was red-flagged, as many other drivers had. This essentially gave him a free pit stop while the race was suspended. After the restart, the track began to dry out, and after changing to intermediate tyres and finally slicks, Kobayashi dropped several places, including having a spin whilst lapping a backmarker and being rear-ended by Nick Heidfeld. He eventually finished seventh, 0.045 seconds behind Felipe Massa, who passed him on the final straight.

==== 2012 ====
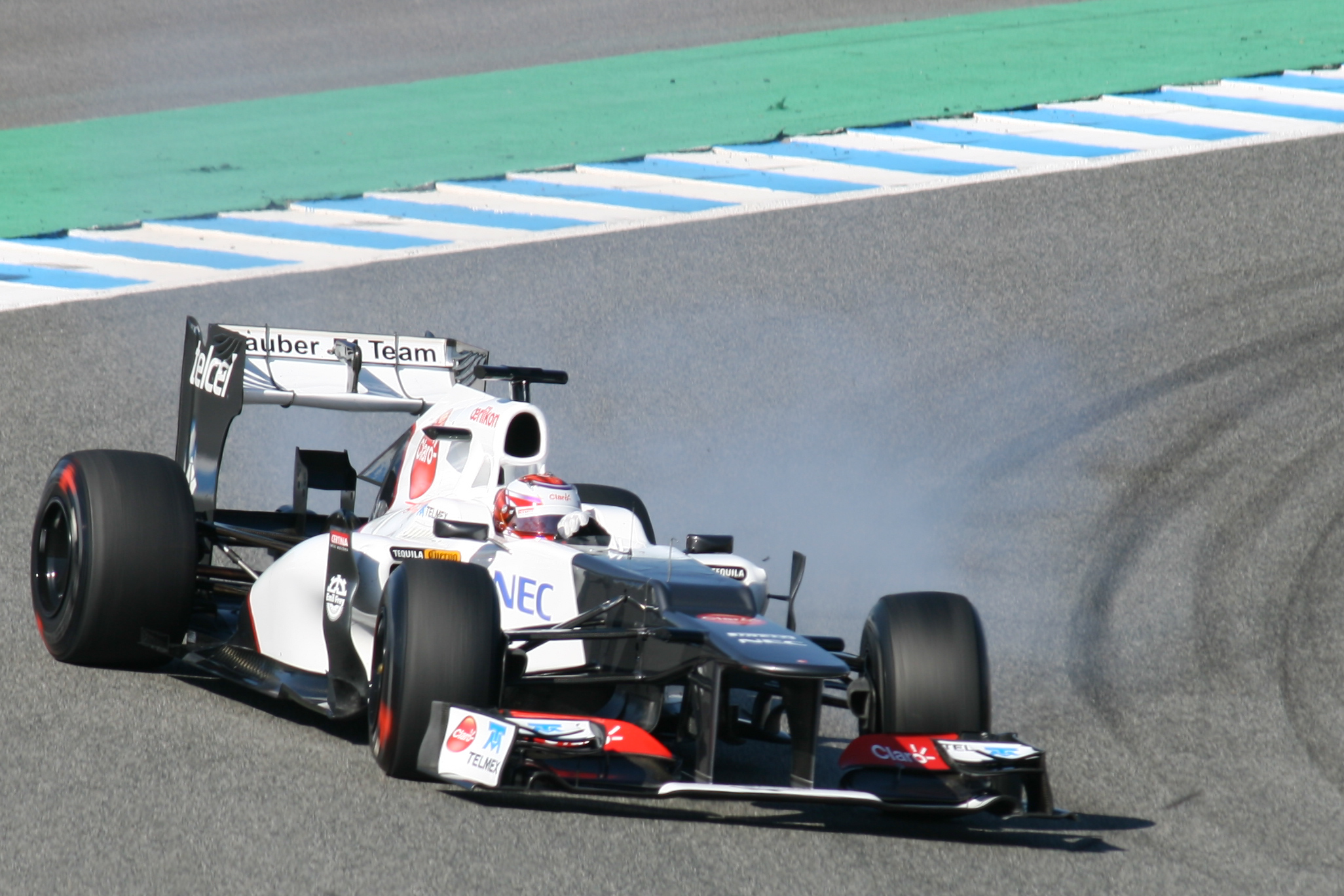
Kobayashi during pre-season testing at Jerez

On 28 July 2011, it was announced that Kobayashi would remain with Sauber into the 2012 season, alongside teammate Pérez.

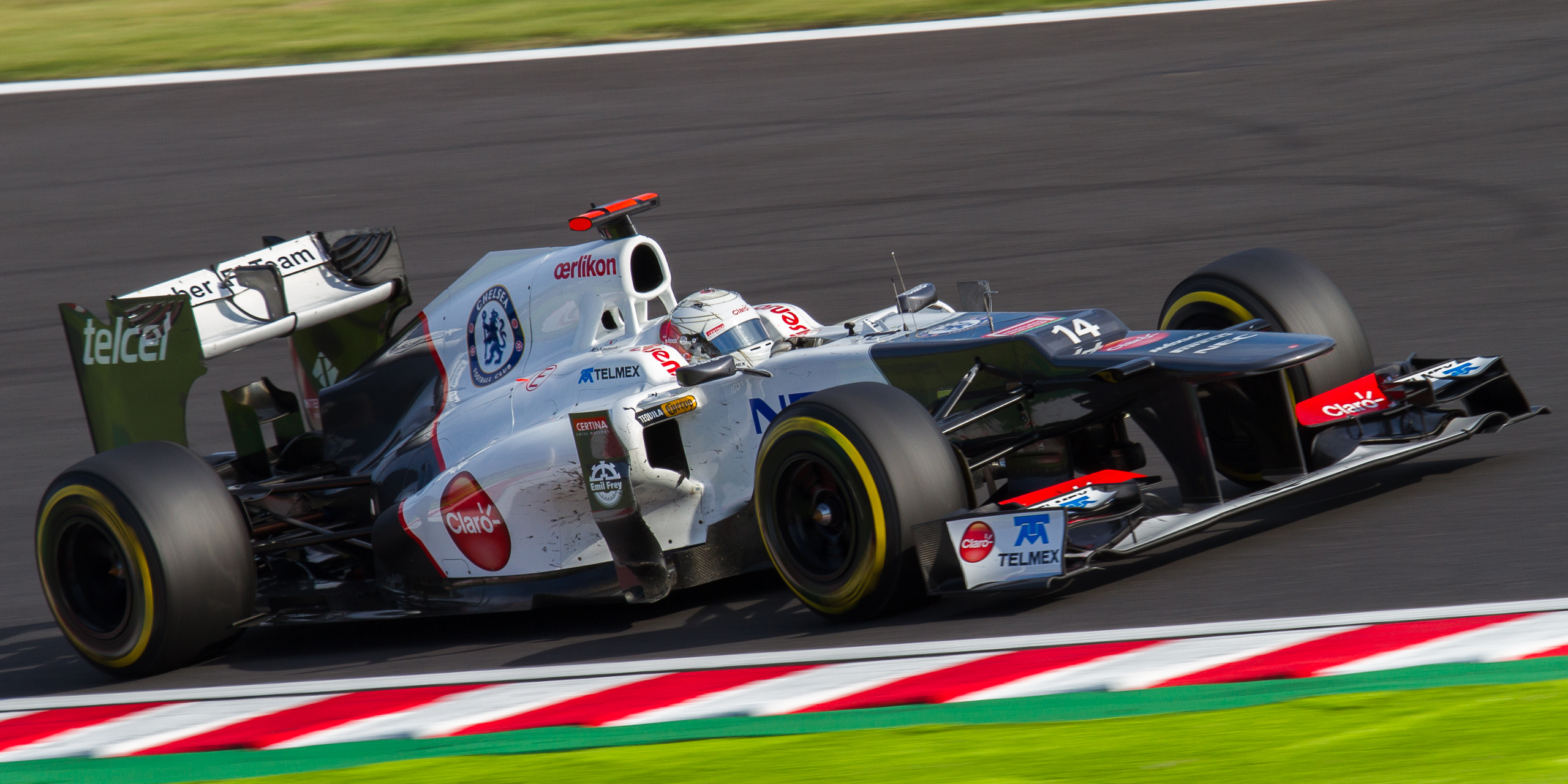
Kobayashi driving for Sauber at the 2012 Japanese Grand Prix

Kobayashi started the season with sixth place at the Australian Grand Prix, and a retirement at the Malaysian Grand Prix, due to a problem with his car's brakes.

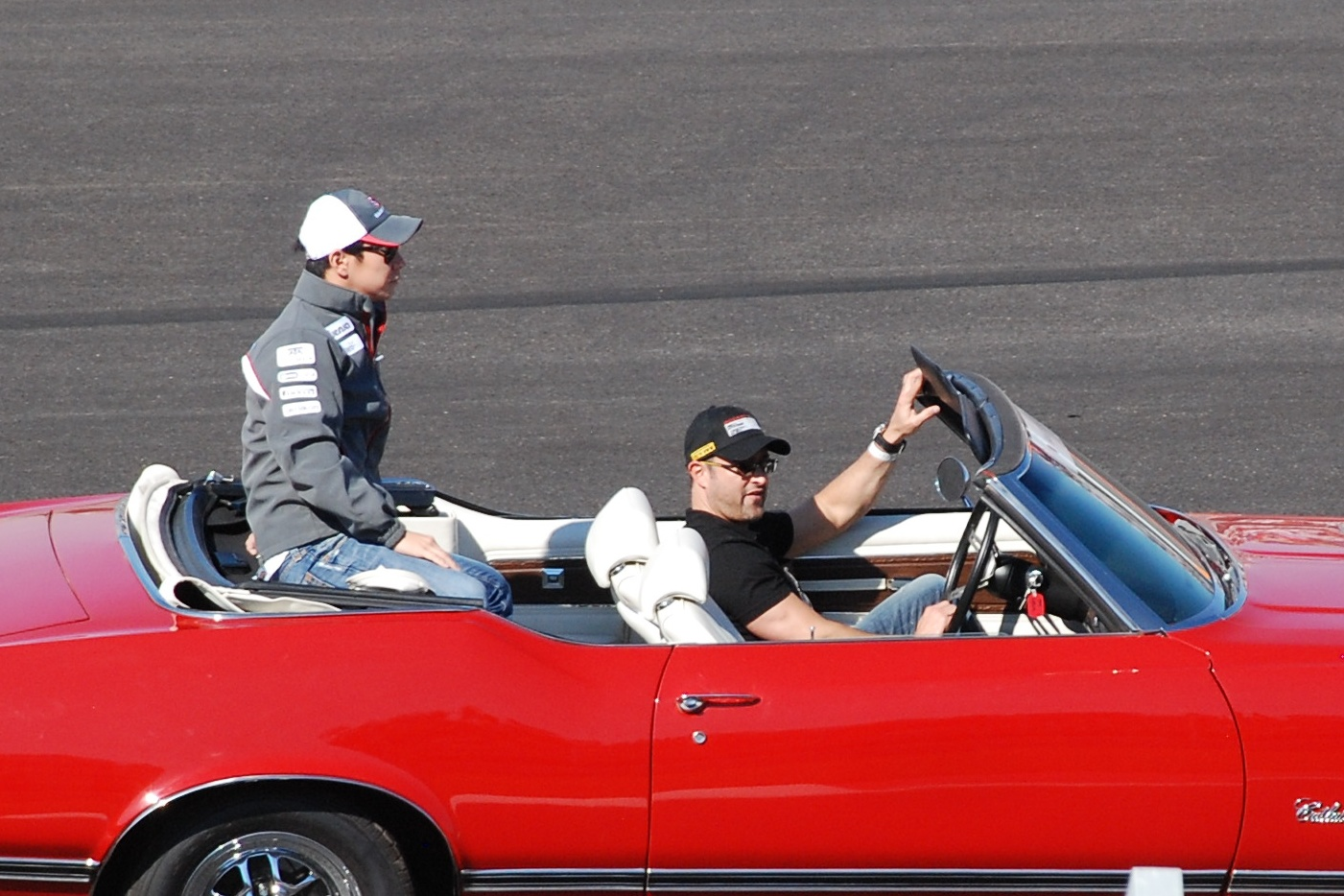
Kobayashi at the 2012 United States Grand Prix

Kobayashi then started third at the Chinese Grand Prix behind the Mercedes of Nico Rosberg and Michael Schumacher. He dropped to tenth but managed to set the fastest lap. At the Spanish Grand Prix, he finished fifth after overtaking Jenson Button and Nico Rosberg. Kobayashi finished in the points once in the next four races, finishing ninth in Canada. Kobayashi finished in a then-career-best fourth place at the German Grand Prix – having finished fifth on-the-road – as he was helped by a post-race penalty for second-placed Sebastian Vettel. After retiring late in the race at the Hungarian Grand Prix, Kobayashi qualified a career-best second for the Belgian Grand Prix but was caught in a first-corner accident along with four other drivers. Kobayashi was the only one of the five to continue in the race, and finished thirteenth.

Kobayashi took his maiden podium in Formula One with third place at the Japanese Grand Prix, after lasting through race-long pressure from Jenson Button. Kobayashi became the first Japanese driver to finish on a Formula One podium in Japan in 22 years, after Aguri Suzuki in the 1990 Japanese Grand Prix, and was the third Japanese driver to finish on a Formula One podium after Suzuki and Takuma Sato in the 2004 United States Grand Prix.

On 23 November 2012, Sauber announced that Kobayashi would not be a part of the team's line-up for the 2013 season, as Nico Hülkenberg and Esteban Gutiérrez would form the race team and Robin Frijns as reserve driver. Kobayashi ultimately finished the season in twelfth place in the Drivers' Championship, with sixty points. Despite raising around €8 million in sponsorship, Kobayashi elected to focus on gaining a competitive drive for the 2014 season rather than a 2013 drive.

== WEC debut (2013) ==
=== AF Corse ===
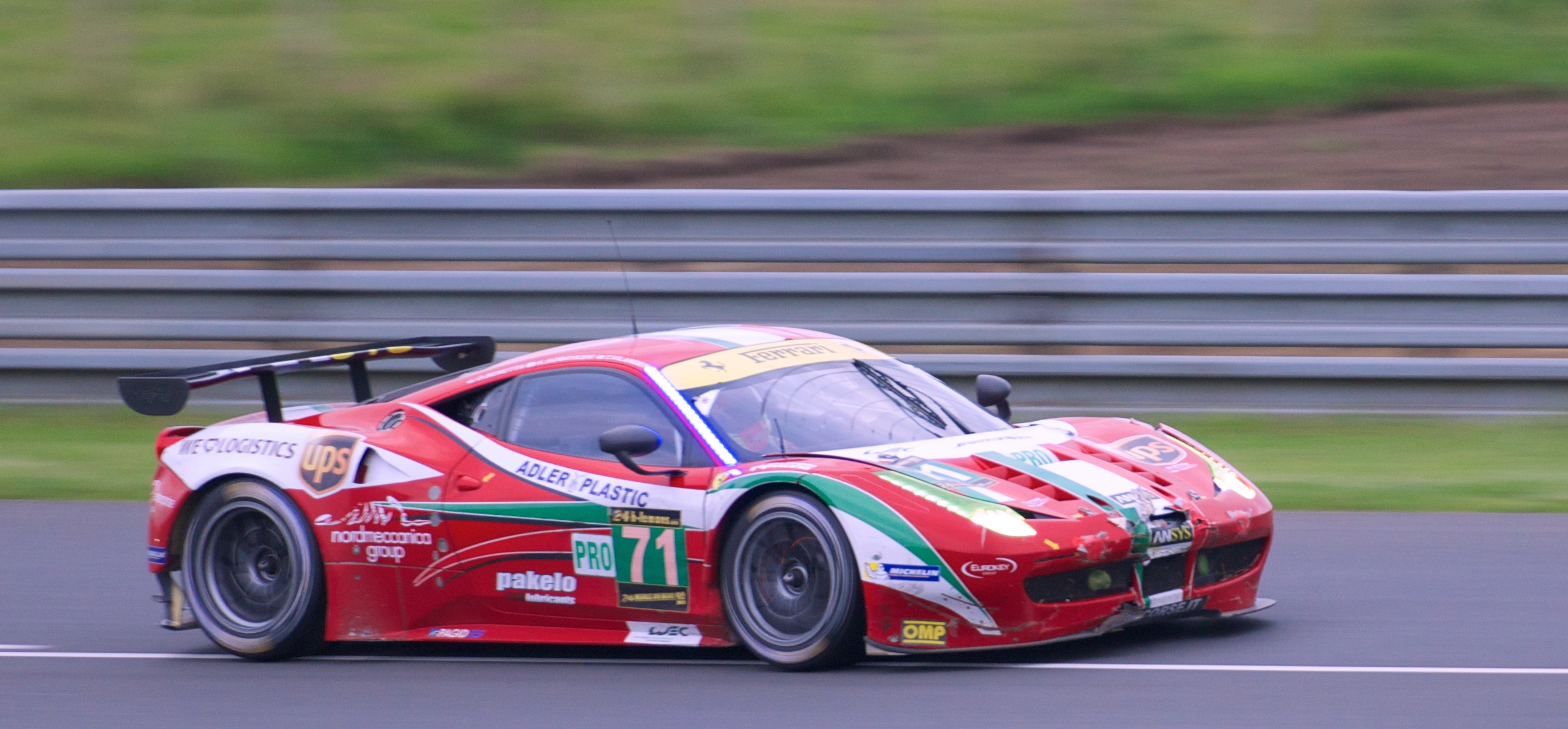
Kobayashi's Ferrari 458 GT during the 2013 24 Hours of Le Mans

On 11 March 2013, it was confirmed that Kobayashi would drive for AF Corse in the 2013 FIA World Endurance Championship season. He competed in the LMGTE-Pro class in the Ferrari 458 GT for what is expected to be all of the season's eight rounds, including the 2013 24 Hours of Le Mans.

Kobayashi also tested a 2010 Formula One Ferrari in preparation for a promotional event in Moscow, where he crashed in the wet.

In the 81st edition of the 24 Hours of Le Mans 2013, Kobayashi and the AF Corse team scored fifth place in the GTE-Pro class along with his co-drivers Olivier Beretta and Toni Vilander, their Ferrari 458 GT covered a total of 312 laps in the Circuit de la Sarthe. The race was run in very difficult weather conditions and several serious accidents bringing out a record of twelve safety car caution periods.

== Return to Formula One (2014) ==
=== Caterham ===
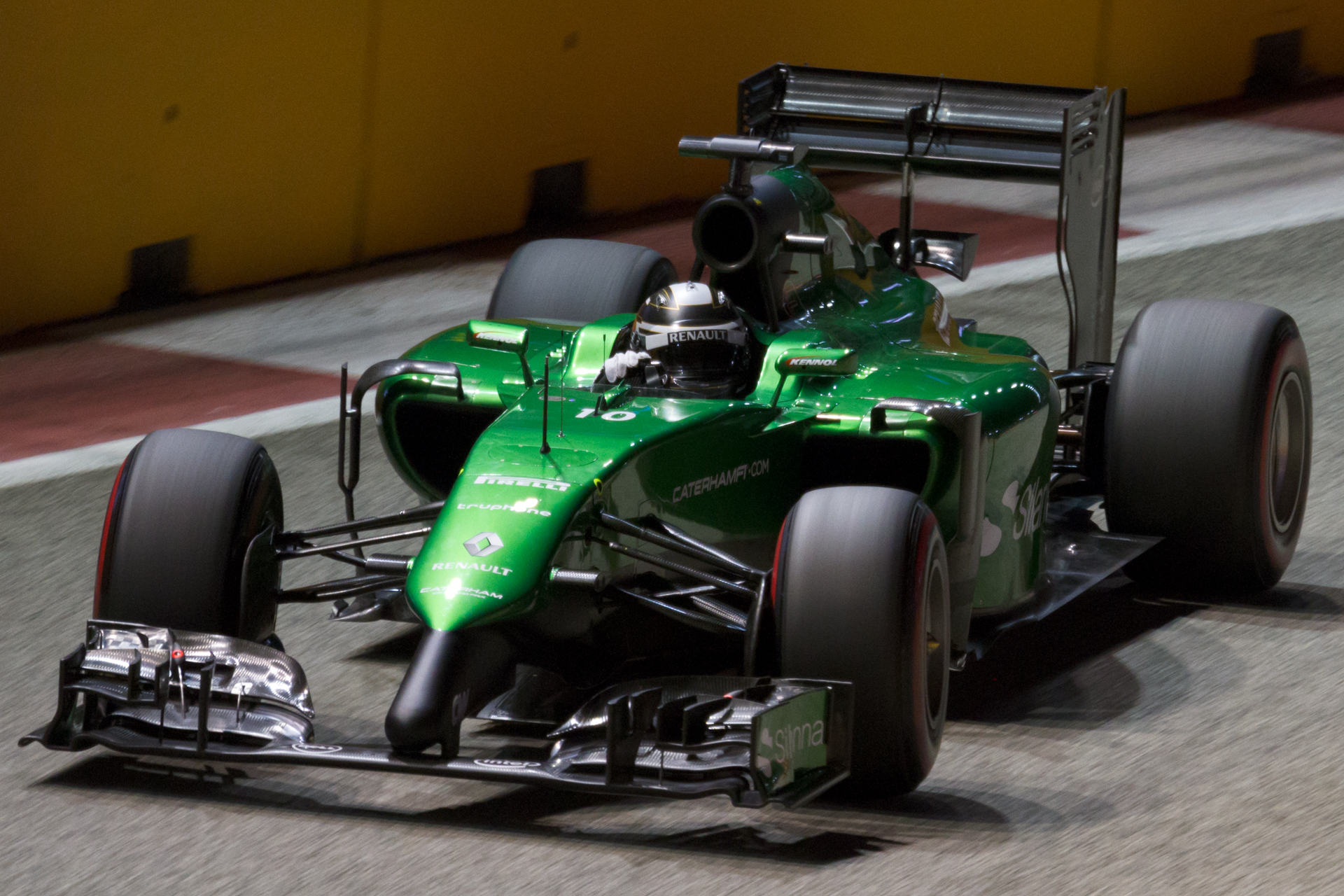
Kobayashi at the 2014 Singapore Grand Prix

On 21 January 2014, it was confirmed that Kobayashi would return to Formula One with the Caterham F1 team for the 2014 season partnering Swedish driver Marcus Ericsson after considerable speculation about the team's all new line-up for the new season. At the first race of the season, the Australian Grand Prix, Kobayashi crashed into Massa at the start due to a brake failure. However, in the following Malaysian Grand Prix, he was running as high as eighth, ahead of his teammate, the Marussias, and several other cars. He however finished the race in thirteenth, promoting Caterham to tenth in the Constructors' standings. However, later in the season Caterham were demoted to 11th due to Jules Bianchi achieving Marussia's first points finish in the Monaco Grand Prix.

On 20 August 2014, it was announced that German driver André Lotterer would replace Kobayashi for the Belgian Grand Prix race weekend. He returned to racing action at the Italian Grand Prix after Lotterer declined a further offer due to the seat being taken in practice by Roberto Merhi, who was attempting to qualify for an FIA Super Licence. Kobayashi declared his unhappiness at the situation, with the team's driver plans changing at short notice and his own future uncertain.

=== Haas F1 test (2025) ===
Kobayashi returned to the wheel of a Formula One car in June 2025 after eleven years, driving the Haas VF-23 for the Haas F1 Team at Circuit Paul Ricard. The test is due to Haas' close ties with Kobayashi's WEC team, Toyota Gazoo Racing, with Toyota willing to give Kobayashi an opportunity to test a modern Formula One car.

== Super Formula and WEC split ==
=== Super Formula and Super GT (2015–present) ===
==== Super Formula ====
On 30 January 2015, it was confirmed that Kobayashi would drive for Team LeMans in the 2015 Super Formula season. He scored three podiums on his way to a fifth-place finish in the drivers' championship during his first year in the series. His second year with Team LeMans was less successful, only managing to score one point and finishing seventeenth in the championship.

Kobayashi moved to KCMG at the start of the 2017 season. Kobayashi stayed in the team for over seven years, where he clinched four podiums of second place. But for 2020 and 2021, he did not compete full-time as he had clashing races where he prioritized WEC, his replacements were Yuichi Nakayama for 2020, and Kazuto Kotaka for 2021. Kobayashi then continued to race with KCMG, and he clinched his first podium since 2019 with third place at Fuji Speedway in 2024.

Kobayashi left KCMG after competed with them for eight seasons, as he moves to KDDI TGMGP TGR-DC with rookie Rikuto Kobayashi.

==== Super GT ====
Kobayashi made his one off debut in Super GT GT500 class with Racing Project Bandoh in 2017. Kobayashi made full season debut in 2018, as he raced with SARD alongside former F1 driver and the series champion Heikki Kovalainen.

=== Return to FIA World Endurance Championship (2016–present) ===
==== Toyota Gazoo Racing ====
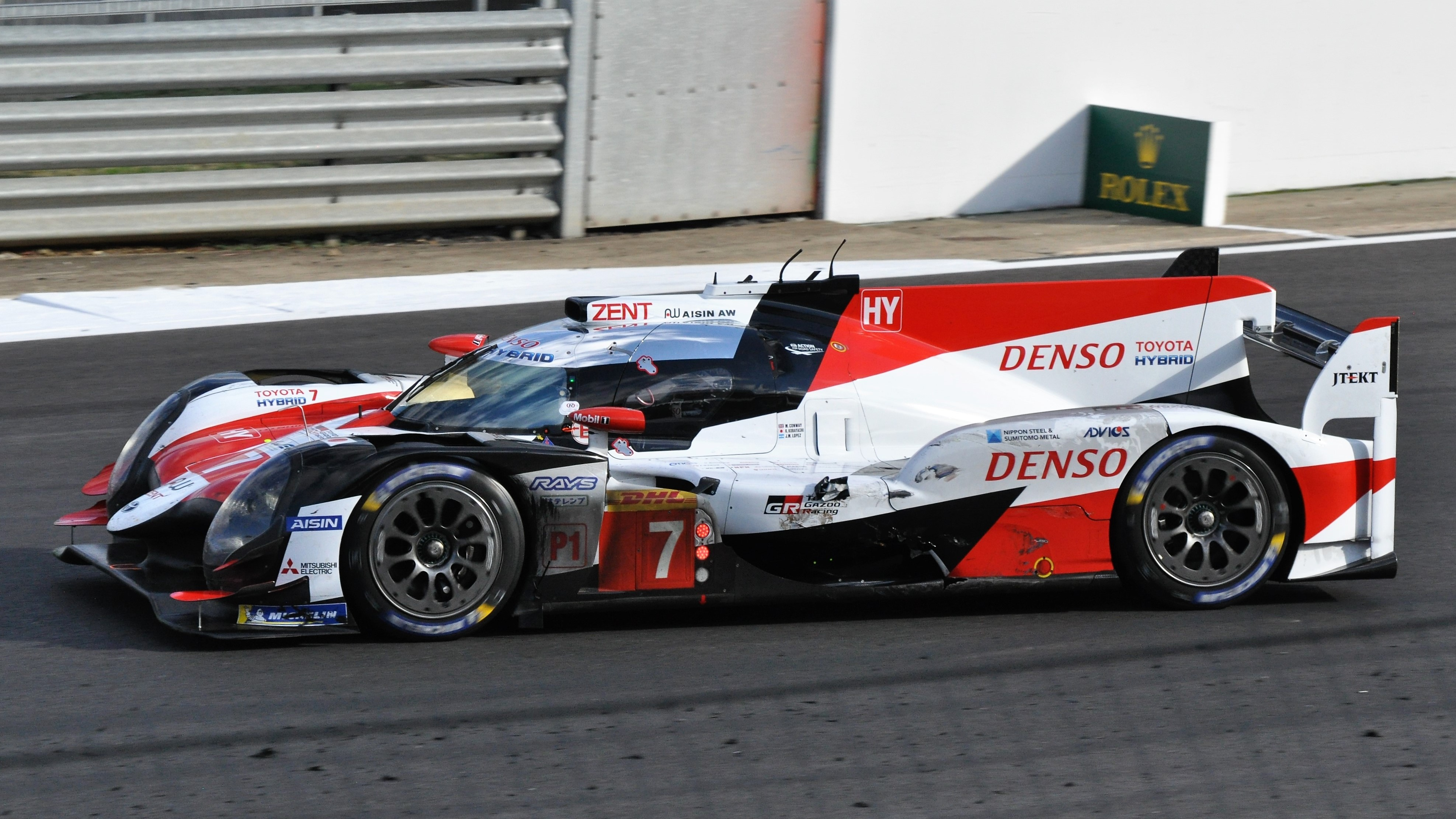
Kobayashi driving in the 2018 6 Hours of Silverstone

On 4 February 2016, Kobayashi was confirmed as a LMP1 driver for Toyota Gazoo Racing in the FIA World Endurance Championship.

Kobayashi scored his first WEC race victory at the 2016 6 Hours of Fuji, finishing ahead of the No. 8 Audi and the No. 1 Porsche.

In 2017, Kobayashi achieved the current lap record at the Circuit de la Sarthe with a lap time of 3:14.791.

Kobayashi won the 2021 24 Hours of Le Mans from pole after numerous attempts, alongside Mike Conway and Jose Maria Lopez. Kobayashi is the fourth Japanese driver to win the 24 Hours of Le Mans, the first being Masanori Sekiya, and is only the second to do so for a Japanese manufacturer.

In December 2021, Toyota announced that Kobayashi would succeed Hisatake Murata as team principal of the manufacturer's WEC programme, combining the management position with his role as a driver for the team.

=== NASCAR (2023) ===
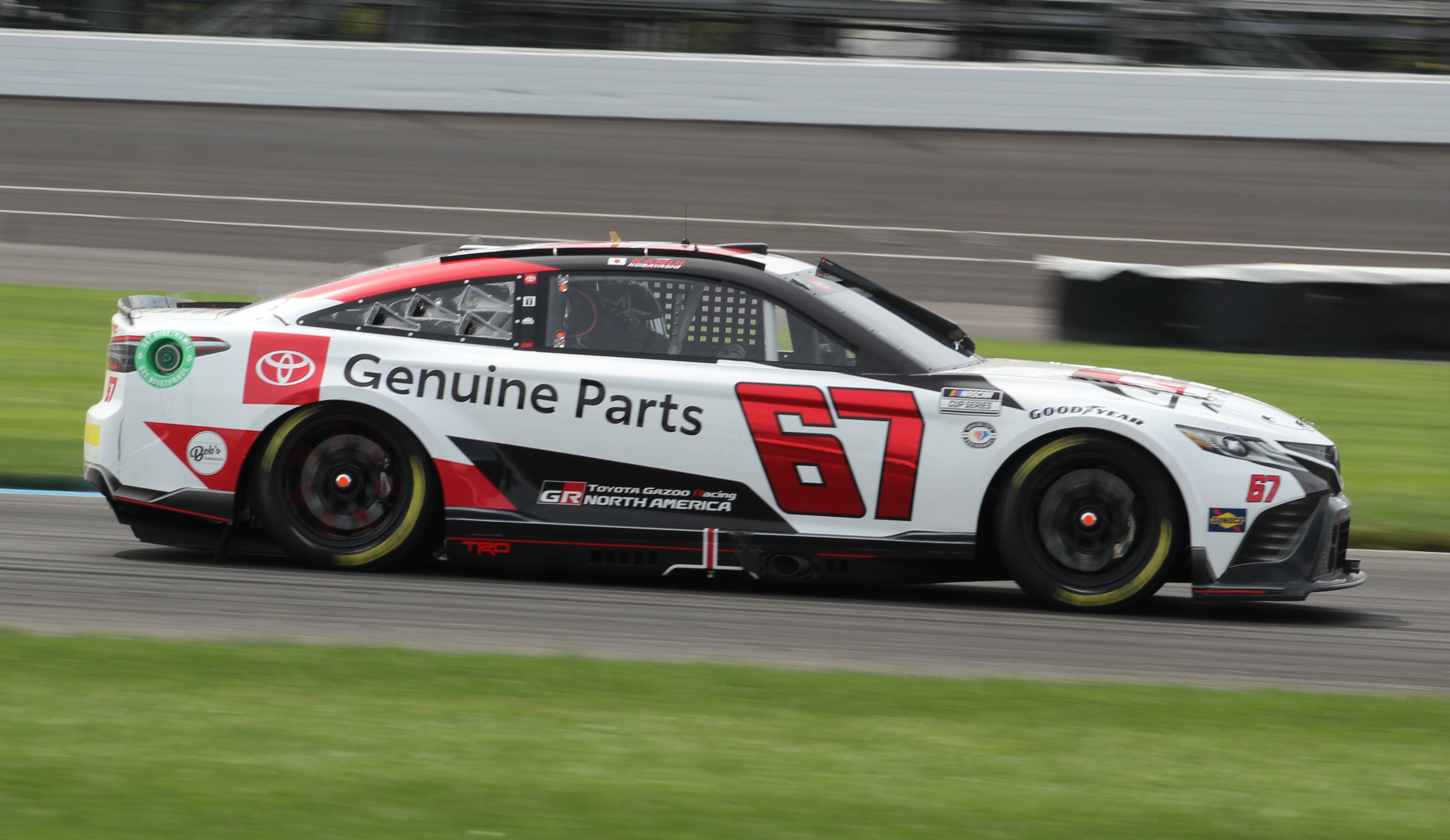
Kobayashi driving in the Verizon 200 at the Brickyard

On 7 June 2023, it was announced that Kobayashi would make his debut in the NASCAR Cup Series, driving the No. 67 Toyota Camry for 23XI Racing at the Indianapolis Motor Speedway road course. He finished in 33rd.

In 2024, Kobayashi would return to the NASCAR Cup Series and race again for 23XI Racing at Circuit of the Americas for the 2024 EchoPark Automotive Grand Prix, finishing 29th.

== Personal life ==
Kobayashi was named after Kamuy, a divine being in Ainu mythology, and the letter of the name imitated the sound citing three Kanji from the sentence "Enabling great dream(s)".

In April 2013, Kobayashi was awarded the Outstanding Achievement in Sport Award at The Asian Awards in London.

== Racing record ==
=== Career summary ===
Season	Series	Team	Races	Wins	Poles	F/Laps	Podiums	Points	Position
2003	Formula Toyota	N/A	10	2	4	?	?	120	**2nd**
2004	Formula Renault 2000 Italia	Prema Powerteam	17	2	3	1	3	134	7th
2004	Formula Renault 2000 Germany	Prema Powerteam	2	0	0	0	0	16	31st
2004	Formula Renault 2000 Netherlands	Prema Powerteam	?	?	?	?	?	32	15th
2004	Asian Formula Renault Challenge	Asia Racing Team	1	0	0	?	0	16	31st
2005	Eurocup Formula Renault 2.0	Prema Powerteam	16	6	4	4	8	157	**1st**
2005	Formula Renault 2.0 Italia	Prema Powerteam	15	6	9	8	11	312	**1st**
2006	Formula 3 Euro Series	ASM Formule 3	19	0	0	1	3	34	8th
2006	Macau Grand Prix	ASM Formule 3	1	0	1	0	0	N/A	19th
2006	Masters of Formula 3	ASM Formule 3	1	0	0	0	0	N/A	11th
2007	Formula 3 Euro Series	ASM Formule 3	20	1	1	0	7	59	4th
2007	Macau Grand Prix	ASM Formule 3	1	0	0	0	0	N/A	13th
2007	Masters of Formula 3	ASM Formule 3	1	0	0	0	0	N/A	NC
2007	Formula One	Panasonic Toyota Racing	Third driver						
2008	GP2 Asia Series	DAMS	10	2	0	0	3	22	6th
2008	GP2 Series	DAMS	20	1	0	2	1	10	16th
2008	Formula One	Panasonic Toyota Racing	Test/Reserve driver						
2008–09	GP2 Asia Series	DAMS	11	2	2	3	4	56	**1st**
2009	GP2 Series	DAMS	20	0	0	0	1	13	16th
2009	Formula One	Panasonic Toyota Racing	2	0	0	0	0	3	18th
2010	Formula One	BMW Sauber F1 Team	19	0	0	0	0	32	12th
2011	Formula One	Sauber F1 Team	19	0	0	0	0	30	12th
2012	Formula One	Sauber F1 Team	20	0	0	1	1	60	12th
2013	FIA World Endurance Championship - LMGTE Pro	AF Corse	8	0	0	2	4	98	7th
2013	24 Hours of Le Mans - LMGTE Pro	AF Corse	1	0	0	0	0	N/A	5th
2014	Formula One	Caterham F1 Team	16	0	0	0	0	0	22nd
2015	Super Formula	Kygnus Sunoco Team LeMans	8	0	0	0	3	20	5th
2015	FIA World Endurance Championship	Toyota Racing	Reserve driver						
2016	FIA World Endurance Championship	Toyota Gazoo Racing	9	1	0	1	6	145	**3rd**
2016	24 Hours of Le Mans	Toyota Gazoo Racing	1	0	0	1	1	N/A	**2nd**
2016	Super Formula	Sunoco Team LeMans	9	0	0	2	0	1	17th
2017	FIA World Endurance Championship	Toyota Gazoo Racing	9	0	4	1	3	103.5	5th
2017	24 Hours of Le Mans	Toyota Gazoo Racing	1	0	1	0	0	N/A	DNF
2017	Super Formula	KCMG	7	0	0	1	1	16.5	7th
2017	Blancpain GT Series Endurance Cup	Good Smile Racing with Team UKYO	1	0	0	0	0	0	NC
2017	Intercontinental GT Challenge	Good Smile Racing with Team UKYO	1	0	0	0	0	0	NC
2017	Super GT	Lexus Team WedsSport Bandoh	1	0	0	0	0	10	17th
2017–18	Formula E	MS&AD Andretti Formula E	2	0	0	0	0	0	24th
2018	Super GT	Lexus Team SARD	7	1	0	0	1	27	13th
2018	Super Formula	carrozzeria Team KCMG	5	0	0	1	1	11	10th
2018	24 Hours of Le Mans	Toyota Gazoo Racing	1	0	0	0	1	N/A	**2nd**
2018–19	FIA World Endurance Championship	Toyota Gazoo Racing	8	2	4	2	6	157	**2nd**
2019	Super Formula	carrozzeria Team KCMG	7	0	0	1	2	19	6th
2019	IMSA SportsCar Championship - DPi	Konica Minolta Cadillac	1	1	0	0	1	35	27th
2019	24 Hours of Le Mans	Toyota Gazoo Racing	1	0	1	0	1	N/A	**2nd**
2019	Intercontinental GT Challenge	Mercedes-AMG Team GOOD SMILE	1	0	0	0	0	1	25th
2019–20	FIA World Endurance Championship	Toyota Gazoo Racing	8	4	3	1	8	207	**1st**
2020	Super Formula	carrozzeria Team KCMG	5	0	0	1	0	8	16th
2020	IMSA SportsCar Championship - DPi	Konica Minolta Cadillac	1	1	0	1	1	35	23rd
2020	GT World Challenge Europe Endurance Cup	HubAuto Corsa	1	0	0	0	0	0	NC
2020	Intercontinental GT Challenge	HubAuto Corsa	1	0	0	0	0	0	NC
2020	24 Hours of Le Mans	Toyota Gazoo Racing	1	0	1	0	1	N/A	**3rd**
2021	FIA World Endurance Championship - Hypercar	Toyota Gazoo Racing	6	3	4	0	6	173	**1st**
2021	24 Hours of Le Mans - Hypercar	Toyota Gazoo Racing	1	1	1	0	1	N/A	**1st**
2021	IMSA SportsCar Championship - DPi	Ally Cadillac Racing	4	0	0	0	1	1203	12th
2021	Super Formula	carrozzeria Team KCMG	1	0	0	0	0	1	20th
2021	Super Taikyū - ST-Q	ORC ROOKIE Racing	1	0	0	0	0	N/A	NC
2022	FIA World Endurance Championship - Hypercar	Toyota Gazoo Racing	6	2	1	1	5	133	**3rd**
2022	24 Hours of Le Mans - Hypercar	Toyota Gazoo Racing	1	0	0	1	1	N/A	**2nd**
2022	IMSA SportsCar Championship - DPi	Ally Cadillac	4	0	0	0	1	1146	11th
2022	IMSA SportsCar Championship - GTD Pro	Vasser Sullivan Racing	1	0	0	0	0	276	28th
2022	Super Formula	KCMG	10	0	0	0	0	9	17th
2023	FIA World Endurance Championship - Hypercar	Toyota Gazoo Racing	7	4	3	4	5	145	**2nd**
2023	24 Hours of Le Mans - Hypercar	Toyota Gazoo Racing	1	0	0	0	0	N/A	DNF
2023	Super Formula	Kids com Team KCMG	9	0	0	0	0	17.5	11th
2023	NASCAR Cup Series	23XI Racing	1	0	0	0	0	0	63rd
2024	FIA World Endurance Championship - Hypercar	Toyota Gazoo Racing	8	1	1	2	3	113	**3rd**
2024	Nürburgring Langstrecken-Serie - SP10	Toyota Gazoo Racing	2	0	0	0	0	*	*
2024	Nürburgring Langstrecken-Serie - SP8T	Toyota Gazoo Racing	?	?	?	?	?	—	—
2024	Super Formula	Kids com Team KCMG	9	0	0	0	1	22.5	10th
2024	NASCAR Cup Series	23XI Racing	1	0	0	0	0	8	41st
2025	FIA World Endurance Championship - Hypercar	Toyota Gazoo Racing	8	1	1	0	1	89	6th
2025	Super Formula	Kids com Team KCMG	10	0	0	1	0	21	13th
2025	Intercontinental GT Challenge	Goodsmile Racing & Team UKYO	?	?	?	?	?	—	—
2025	GT World Challenge Europe Endurance Cup	Goodsmile Racing & Team UKYO	1	0	0	0	0	0	NC
2025	IMSA SportsCar Championship - GTP	Cadillac Wayne Taylor Racing	1	0	0	0	0	223	40th
2026	FIA World Endurance Championship - Hypercar	Toyota Gazoo Racing	8	1	0	1	3	97	**2nd**
2026	Super Formula	KDDI TGMGP TGR-DC	10	0	0	2	0	5	20th*
2026	Super GT - GT300	Team ENEOS Rookie	1	0	0	0	0	10	36th
2026	Nürburgring Langstrecken-Serie - SP9	KCMG	3	0	0	0	0	—	—

^{*} Season still in progress.

=== Complete Formula Renault 2.0 Italia results ===
(key) (Races in bold indicate pole position; races in italics indicate fastest lap)

Year	Entrant	1	2	3	4	5	6	7	8	9	10	11	12	13	14	15	16	17	DC	Points
2004	Prema Powerteam	VLL; 1 Ret	VLL; 2; 10	VAR; 7	MAG; 3	SPA; 1; 6	SPA; 2; 9	MNZ1; 1; 18	MNZ1; 2; 10	MNZ1; 3; 6	MIS; 1; 1	**MIS**; **2**; 1	**MIS**; **3**; 13	ADR; 8	HOC; 1; 4	HOC; 2; 24	MNZ2; 1; 4	MNZ2; 2; 12	7th	134
2005	Prema Powerteam	VLL; 1 Ret	VLL; 2; 1	**IMO**; **1**; 1	IMO; 2; 1	**SPA**; **1**; 3	SPA; 2; 2	MNZ1; 1; 1	MNZ1; 2; 3	**MNZ1**; **3**; 1	MUG; 1	MUG; 2	MIS; 1; 6	MIS; 2; 2	MIS; 3; 5	VAR; 4	**MNZ2**; **1**; 1	MNZ2; 2; 2	1st	254

=== Complete Eurocup Formula Renault 2.0 results ===
(key) (Races in bold indicate pole position; races in italics indicate fastest lap)

Year	Entrant	1	2	3	4	5	6	7	8	9	10	11	12	13	14	15	16	DC	Points
2005	Prema Powerteam	ZOL; 1 Ret	ZOL; 2; 14	VAL; 1; 2	VAL; 2; 4	LMS; 1; 1	LMS; 2; 5	BIL; 1; 5	BIL; 2 Ret	OSC; 1; 1	OSC; 2; 4	**DON**; **1**; 1	**DON**; **2**; 1	**EST**; **1**; 1	EST; 2; 4	**MNZ**; **1**; 1	MNZ; 2; 3	1st	157

=== Complete Formula 3 Euro Series record ===
(key) (Races in bold indicate pole position; races in italics indicate fastest lap)

Year	Team	Chassis	Engine	1	2	3	4	5	6	7	8	9	10	11	12	13	14	15	16	17	18	19	20	Pos	Points
2006	ASM Formule 3	Dallara F305/012	Mercedes	HOC; 1; 6	HOC; 2; 5	LAU; 1; 11	LAU; 2; 10	OSC; 1; 11	OSC; 2; 7	BRH; 1; 6	BRH; 2; 3	NOR; 1; 5	NOR; 2; 2	NÜR; 1; 8	NÜR; 2; 3	ZAN; 1; 5	ZAN; 2 Ret	CAT; 1; 5	CAT; 2 Ret	BUG; 1 DNS	BUG; 2; 14	**HOC**; **1** Ret	HOC; 2; 9	8th	34
2007	ASM Formule 3	Dallara F305/012	Mercedes	HOC; 1; 10	HOC; 2; 10	BRH; 1; 3	BRH; 2; 3	NOR; 1; 8	NOR; 2 Ret	**MAG**; **1**; 1	MAG; 2; 9	MUG; 1; 2	MUG; 2; 4	ZAN; 1; 2	ZAN; 2; 17	NÜR; 1; 11	NÜR; 2 Ret	CAT; 1; 19	CAT; 2 Ret	NOG; 1; 2	NOG; 2; 2	HOC; 1; 4	HOC; 2 Ret	4th	59

=== Complete Macau Grand Prix results ===
Year	Team	Car	Qualifying	Quali Race	Main race
2006	(France) ASM Formule 3	Dallara F305	**1st**	**1st**	19th
2007	(France) ASM Formule 3	Dallara F305	7th	DNF	13th

=== Complete GP2 Series results ===
(key) (Races in bold indicate pole position; races in italics indicate fastest lap)

Year	Entrant	1	2	3	4	5	6	7	8	9	10	11	12	13	14	15	16	17	18	19	20	DC	Points
2008	DAMS	CAT; FEA; 8	CAT; SPR; 1	IST; FEA; Ret	IST; SPR; 9	MON; FEA; Ret	MON; SPR; Ret	MAG; FEA; Ret	MAG; SPR; 9	SIL; FEA; Ret	SIL; SPR; 7	HOC; FEA; Ret	HOC; SPR; 18	HUN; FEA; 11	HUN; SPR; 8	VAL; FEA; Ret	VAL; SPR; 6	SPA; FEA; 9	SPA; SPR; 14	MNZ; FEA; Ret	MNZ; SPR; 13	16th	10
2009	DAMS	CAT; FEA; 8	CAT; SPR; 5	MON; FEA; Ret	MON; SPR; 12	IST; FEA; Ret	IST; SPR; NC	SIL; FEA; Ret	SIL; SPR; 17	NÜR; FEA; 9	NÜR; SPR; 3	HUN; FEA; 13	HUN; SPR; 8	VAL; FEA; 8	VAL; SPR; 11	SPA; FEA; 7	SPA; SPR; 11	MNZ; FEA; 17	MNZ; SPR; 17†	ALG; FEA; 6	ALG; SPR; 19	16th	13

==== Complete GP2 Asia Series results ====
(key) (Races in bold indicate pole position; races in italics indicate fastest lap)

Year	Entrant	1	2	3	4	5	6	7	8	9	10	11	12	DC	Points
2008	DAMS	DUB1; FEA; 13	DUB1; SPR; Ret	SEN; FEA; DNS	SEN; SPR; 15	SEP; FEA; 5	SEP; SPR; 1	BHR; FEA; 3	BHR; SPR; 1	DUB2; FEA; 20	DUB2; SPR; 14			6th	22
2008–09	DAMS	SHI; FEA; 2	SHI; SPR; Ret	**DUB**; **FEA**; 1	DUB; SPR; C	BHR1; FEA; 1	BHR1; SPR; 6	LSL; FEA; 4	LSL; SPR; 18	SEP; FEA; 2	SEP; SPR; 7	**BHR2**; **FEA**; 4	BHR2; SPR; 5	1st	56

=== Complete Formula One results ===
(key) (Races in bold indicate pole position; races in italics indicate fastest lap)

Year	Entrant	Chassis	Engine	1	2	3	4	5	6	7	8	9	10	11	12	13	14	15	16	17	18	19	20	WDC	Points
2009	Panasonic Toyota Racing	Toyota TF109	Toyota RVX-09 2.4 V8	AUS	MAL	CHN	BHR	ESP	MON	TUR	GBR	GER	HUN	EUR	BEL	ITA	SIN	JPN; PO	BRA; 9	ABU; 6				18th	3
2010	BMW Sauber F1 Team	Sauber C29	Ferrari 056 2.4 V8	BHR; Ret	AUS; Ret	MAL; Ret	CHN; Ret	ESP; 12	MON; Ret	TUR; 10	CAN; Ret	EUR; 7	GBR; 6	GER; 11	HUN; 9	BEL; 8	ITA; Ret	SIN; Ret	JPN; 7	KOR; 8	BRA; 10	ABU; 14		12th	32
2011	Sauber F1 Team	Sauber C30	Ferrari 056 2.4 V8	AUS; DSQ	MAL; 7	CHN; 10	TUR; 10	ESP; 10	MON; 5	CAN; 7	EUR; 16	GBR; Ret	GER; 9	HUN; 11	BEL; 12	ITA; Ret	SIN; 14	JPN; 13	KOR; 15	IND; Ret	ABU; 10	BRA; 9		12th	30
2012	Sauber F1 Team	Sauber C31	Ferrari 056 2.4 V8	AUS; 6	MAL; Ret	CHN; 10	BHR; 13	ESP; 5	MON; Ret	CAN; 9	EUR; Ret	GBR; 11	GER; 4	HUN; 18†	BEL; 13	ITA; 9	SIN; 13	JPN; 3	KOR; Ret	IND; 14	ABU; 6	USA; 14	BRA; 9	12th	60
2014	Caterham F1 Team	Caterham CT05	Renault Energy F1‑2014 1.6 V6 t	AUS; Ret	MAL; 13	BHR; 15	CHN; 18	ESP; Ret	MON; 13	CAN; Ret	AUT; 16	GBR; 15	GER; 16	HUN; Ret	BEL	ITA; 17	SIN; DNS	JPN; 19	RUS; Ret	USA	BRA	ABU; Ret		22nd	0

^{†} Did not finish the race, but was classified as he completed over 90% of the race distance.

=== Complete FIA World Endurance Championship results ===
(key) (Races in bold indicate pole position; races in italics indicate fastest lap)

Year	Entrant	Class	Chassis	Engine	1	2	3	4	5	6	7	8	9	Rank	Points
2013	AF Corse	LMGTE Pro	Ferrari 458 Italia GT2	Ferrari F142 4.5L V8	SIL; 2	SPA; 3	LMS; 4	SÃO; Ret	COA; 3	FUJ; 9	SHA; 5	BHR; 3		7th	98
2016	Toyota Gazoo Racing	LMP1	Toyota TS050 Hybrid	Toyota H8909 2.4 L Turbo V6 (Hybrid)	SIL; 2	SPA; Ret	LMS; 2	NÜR; 6	MEX; 3	COA; 3	FUJ; 1	SHA; 2	BHR; 5	3rd	145
2017	Toyota Gazoo Racing	LMP1	Toyota TS050 Hybrid	Toyota H8909 2.4 L Turbo V6 (Hybrid)	**SIL**; 13	SPA; 2	**LMS**; Ret	**NÜR**; 3	MEX; 4	COA; 4	FUJ; 2	**SHA**; 4	BHR; 4	5th	103.5
2018–19	Toyota Gazoo Racing	LMP1	Toyota TS050 Hybrid	Toyota H8909 2.4 L Turbo V6 (Hybrid)	SPA; 2	LMS; 2	**SIL**; DSQ	FUJ; 1	**SHA**; 1	SEB; 2	**SPA**; 6	**LMS**; 2		2nd	157
2019–20	Toyota Gazoo Racing	LMP1	Toyota TS050 Hybrid	Toyota H8909 2.4 L Turbo V6 (Hybrid)	**SIL**; 1	FUJ; 2	SHA; 3	BHR; 1	COA; 3	SPA; 1	**LMS**; 3	**BHR**; 1		1st	207
2021	Toyota Gazoo Racing	Hypercar	Toyota GR010 Hybrid	Toyota H8909 3.5 L Turbo V6 (Hybrid)	**SPA**; 3	ALG; 2	**MNZ**; 1	**LMS**; 1	BHR; 1	**BHR**; 2				1st	173
2022	Toyota Gazoo Racing	Hypercar	Toyota GR010 Hybrid	Toyota H8909 3.5 L Turbo V6 (Hybrid)	SEB; Ret	SPA; 1	LMS; 2	MNZ; 3	**FUJ**; 2	BHR; 1				3rd	133
2023	Toyota Gazoo Racing	Hypercar	Toyota GR010 Hybrid	Toyota H8909 3.5 L Turbo V6 (Hybrid)	SEB; 1	ALG; 9	**SPA**; 1	LMS; Ret	**MNZ**; 1	**FUJ**; 1	BHR; 2			2nd	145
2024	Toyota Gazoo Racing	Hypercar	Toyota GR010 Hybrid	Toyota H8909 3.5 L Turbo V6 (Hybrid)	QAT; 5	IMO; 1	SPA; 7	LMS; 2	**SÃO**; 4	COA; 2	FUJ; Ret	BHR; Ret		3rd	113
2025	Toyota Gazoo Racing	Hypercar	Toyota GR010 Hybrid	Toyota H8909 3.5 L Turbo V6 (Hybrid)	QAT; 6	IMO; 7	SPA; 7	LMS; 5	SÃO; 14	COA; 14	FUJ; 7	**BHR**; 1		6th	89
2026	Toyota Racing	Hypercar	Toyota TR010 Hybrid	Toyota H8909 3.5 L Turbo V6 (Hybrid)	IMO; 3	SPA; 5	LMS; 1	SÃO; 12	COA; Ret	FUJ; 8	CAT; 2	MNZ; 11		2nd	97

=== Complete 24 Hours of Le Mans results ===
Year	Team	Co-Drivers	Car	Class	Laps	Pos.	Class Pos.
2013	(Italy) AF Corse	(Finland) Toni Vilander (Monaco) Olivier Beretta	Ferrari 458 Italia GT	GTE; Pro	312	20th	5th
2016	(Japan) Toyota Gazoo Racing	(United Kingdom) Mike Conway (France) Stéphane Sarrazin	Toyota TS050 Hybrid	LMP1	381	**2nd**	**2nd**
2017	(Japan) Toyota Gazoo Racing	(United Kingdom) Mike Conway (France) Stéphane Sarrazin	Toyota TS050 Hybrid	LMP1	154	DNF	DNF
2018	(Japan) Toyota Gazoo Racing	(United Kingdom) Mike Conway (Argentina) José María López	Toyota TS050 Hybrid	LMP1	386	**2nd**	**2nd**
2019	(Japan) Toyota Gazoo Racing	(United Kingdom) Mike Conway (Argentina) José María López	Toyota TS050 Hybrid	LMP1	385	**2nd**	**2nd**
2020	(Japan) Toyota Gazoo Racing	(United Kingdom) Mike Conway (Argentina) José María López	Toyota TS050 Hybrid	LMP1	381	**3rd**	**3rd**
2021	(Japan) Toyota Gazoo Racing	(United Kingdom) Mike Conway (Argentina) José María López	Toyota GR010 Hybrid	Hypercar	371	**1st**	**1st**
2022	(Japan) Toyota Gazoo Racing	(United Kingdom) Mike Conway (Argentina) José María López	Toyota GR010 Hybrid	Hypercar	380	**2nd**	**2nd**
2023	(Japan) Toyota Gazoo Racing	(United Kingdom) Mike Conway (Argentina) José María López	Toyota GR010 Hybrid	Hypercar	103	DNF	DNF
2024	(Japan) Toyota Gazoo Racing	(Argentina) José María López (Netherlands) Nyck de Vries	Toyota GR010 Hybrid	Hypercar	311	**2nd**	**2nd**
2025	(Japan) Toyota Gazoo Racing	(United Kingdom) Mike Conway (Netherlands) Nyck de Vries	Toyota GR010 Hybrid	Hypercar	386	5th	5th
2026	(Japan) Toyota Racing	(United Kingdom) Mike Conway (Netherlands) Nyck de Vries	Toyota TR010 Hybrid	Hypercar	381	**1st**	**1st**

=== Complete Super Formula results ===
(key) (Races in bold indicate pole position; races in italics indicate fastest lap)

Year	Team	Engine	1	2	3	4	5	6	7	8	9	10	11	12	DC	Points
2015	Kygnus Sunoco Team LeMans	Toyota	SUZ; 9	OKA; 2	FUJ; 10	MOT; 17	AUT; 3	SUG; 6	SUZ; 3	SUZ; 9					6th	20
2016	Sunoco Team LeMans	Toyota	SUZ; 16	OKA; 18	FUJ; 10	MOT; 9	OKA; 18	OKA; 17	SUG; 17	SUZ; 9	SUZ; 7				17th	1
2017	KCMG	Toyota	SUZ; 9	OKA; 4	OKA; 5	FUJ; 15	MOT; 2	AUT; 7	SUG; 7	SUZ; C	SUZ; C				7th	16.5
2018	carrozzeria Team KCMG	Toyota	SUZ; 10	AUT; C	SUG; 6	FUJ; 12	MOT	OKA; 2‡	SUZ; 13						10th	11
2019	carrozzeria Team KCMG	Toyota	SUZ; 9	AUT; 10	SUG; 2	FUJ; 6	MOT; 2	OKA; 18	SUZ; 12						6th	19
2020	carrozzeria Team KCMG	Toyota	MOT; 14	OKA	SUG; 14	AUT	SUZ; 4	SUZ; 15	FUJ; 11						16th	8
2021	carrozzeria Team KCMG	Toyota	FUJ	SUZ	AUT	SUG	MOT	MOT; 10	SUZ						20th	1
2022	KCMG	Toyota	FUJ; 18	FUJ; 9	SUZ; 5	AUT; Ret	SUG; 17	FUJ; 14	MOT; 14	MOT; 17	SUZ; 18	SUZ; 10			17th	9
2023	Kids com Team KCMG	Toyota	FUJ; Ret	FUJ; 6	SUZ; 14	AUT; 11	SUG; 6	FUJ; 9	MOT; 7	SUZ; 8‡	SUZ; 17				11th	17.5
2024	Kids com Team KCMG	Toyota	SUZ; 19†	AUT; 10	SUG; 10‡	FUJ; 8	MOT; 12	FUJ; 3	FUJ; 5	SUZ; 14	SUZ; 10				10th	22.5
2025	Kids com Team KCMG	Toyota	SUZ; 5	SUZ; 9	MOT	MOT	AUT; 7	FUJ; 22	FUJ; 4	SUG; 19	FUJ; 14	SUZ; 15	SUZ; 15	SUZ; 15	13th	21
2026	KDDI TGMGP TGR-DC	Toyota	MOT; Ret	MOT; 12	SUZ; 17	SUZ; 10	FUJ; 12	FUJ; 12	FUJ; 9	SUG; 12	FUJ; 9	FUJ; 14	SUZ	SUZ	20th*	5*

^{‡} Half points awarded as less than 75% of race distance was completed.
^{†} Did not finish the race, but was classified as he completed over 90% of the race distance.
^{*} Season still in progress.

=== Complete Super GT results ===
Year	Team	Car	Class	1	2	3	4	5	6	7	8	DC	Points
2017	Lexus Team WedsSport Bandoh	Lexus LC 500	GT500	OKA	FUJ	AUT	SUG	FUJ	SUZ; 4	CHA	MOT	17th	10
2018	Lexus Team SARD	Lexus LC 500	GT500	OKA; 12	FUJ	SUZ; Ret	CHA; 1	FUJ; 11	SUG; 10	AUT; 8	MOT; 8	13th	27
2026	Team ENEOS Rookie	Mercedes-AMG GT3 Evo	GT300	OKA	FUJ; 6	FUJ	SUZ	SUG	AUT	MOT	MOT	36th	10

=== Complete Formula E results ===
(key) (Races in bold indicate pole position; races in italics indicate fastest lap)

Year	Team	Chassis	Powertrain	1	2	3	4	5	6	7	8	9	10	11	12	Pos	Points
2017–18	MS&AD Andretti Formula E	Spark SRT01-e	Andretti ATEC-03	HKG; 15	HKG; 17	MRK	SCL	MEX	PDE	RME	PAR	BER	ZUR	NYC	NYC	24th	0

=== Complete IMSA SportsCar Championship results ===
(key) (Races in bold indicate pole position)

Year	Team	No.	Class	Make	Engine	1	2	3	4	5	6	7	8	9	10	11	12	Rank	Points
2019	Konica Minolta Cadillac	10	DPi	Cadillac DPi-V.R	Cadillac 5.5 L V8	DAY; 1	SEB	LBH	MDO	DET	WGL	MOS	ELK	LGA	PET			27th	35
2020	Konica Minolta Cadillac	10	DPi	Cadillac DPi-V.R	Cadillac 5.5 L V8	DAY; 1	DAY	SEB	ELK	ATL	MDO	PET	LGA	SEB				23rd	35
2021	Ally Cadillac Racing	48	DPi	Cadillac DPi-V.R	Cadillac 5.5 L V8	DAY; 2	SEB; 7	MDO	DET	WGL; 5	WGL	ELK	LGA	LBH	PET; 4			12th	1203
2022	Ally Cadillac	48	DPi	Cadillac DPi-V.R	Cadillac 5.5 L V8	DAY; 5	SEB; 6	LBH	LGA	MDO	DET	WGL; 6					PET; 3	11th	1146
2022	VasserSullivan	14	GTD Pro	Lexus RC F GT3	Toyota 2UR 5.0 L V8								MOS; 6	LIM	ELK	VIR		28th	276
2025	Cadillac Wayne Taylor Racing	40	GTP	Cadillac V-Series.R	Cadillac LMC55R 5.5 L V8	DAY; 11	SEB	LBH	LGA	DET	WGL	ELK	IMS	PET				40th	223

=== 24 Hours of Daytona results ===
Year	Team	Co-Drivers	Car	Class	Laps	Pos.	Class Pos.
2019	(United States) Konica Minolta Cadillac	(Netherlands) Renger van der Zande (United States) Jordan Taylor (Spain) Fernando Alonso	Cadillac DPi-V.R	DPi	593	**1st**	**1st**
2020	(United States) Konica Minolta Cadillac	(Netherlands) Renger van der Zande (Australia) Ryan Briscoe (New Zealand) Scott Dixon	Cadillac DPi-V.R	DPi	833	**1st**	**1st**
2021	(United States) Ally Cadillac Racing	(United States) Jimmie Johnson (France) Simon Pagenaud (Germany) Mike Rockenfeller	Cadillac DPi-V.R	DPi	807	**2nd**	**2nd**
2022	(United States) Ally Cadillac Racing	(United States) Jimmie Johnson (Argentina) José María López (Germany) Mike Rockenfeller	Cadillac DPi-V.R	DPi	739	11th	5th
2025	(United States) Cadillac Wayne Taylor Racing	(Switzerland) Louis Delétraz (United States) Jordan Taylor	Cadillac V-Series.R	GTP	245	DNF	DNF

=== NASCAR ===
(key) (Bold – Pole position awarded by qualifying time. Italics – Pole position earned by points standings or practice time. * – Most laps led.)

==== Cup Series ====
NASCAR Cup Series results
Year	Team	No.	Make	1	2	3	4	5	6	7	8	9	10	11	12	13	14	15	16	17	18	19	20	21	22	23	24	25	26	27	28	29	30	31	32	33	34	35	36	NCSC	Pts	Ref
2023	23XI Racing	67	Toyota	DAY	CAL	LVS	PHO	ATL	COA	RCH	BRD	MAR	TAL	DOV	KAN	DAR	CLT	GTW	SON	NSH	CSC	ATL	NHA	POC	RCH	MCH	IRC; 33	GLN	DAY	DAR	KAN	BRI	TEX	TAL	ROV	LVS	HOM	MAR	PHO	63rd	0^{1}	
2024	23XI Racing	50	Toyota	DAY	ATL	LVS	PHO	BRI	COA; 29	RCH	MAR	TEX	TAL	DOV	KAN	DAR	CLT	GTW	SON	IOW	NHA	NSH	CSC	POC	IND	RCH	MCH	DAY	DAR	ATL	GLN	BRI	KAN	TAL	ROV	LVS	HOM	MAR	PHO	41st	8	

Sporting positions
Preceded by Pastor Maldonado	Italian Formula Renault; Champion; 2005	Succeeded by Dani Clos
Preceded by Scott Speed	Eurocup Formula Renault; Champion; 2005	Succeeded by Filipe Albuquerque
Preceded by Romain Grosjean	GP2 Asia Series; Champion; 2008–09	Succeeded by Davide Valsecchi
Preceded by Sébastien Buemi; Kazuki Nakajima; Fernando Alonso	World Endurance Drivers Champion; 2019–20, 2021; With: Mike Conway & José María López	Succeeded by Sébastien Buemi; Brendon Hartley; Ryō Hirakawa
Preceded by Sébastien Buemi; Brendon Hartley; Kazuki Nakajima	Winner of the 24 Hours of Le Mans; 2021; With: Mike Conway & José María López	Succeeded by Sébastien Buemi; Brendon Hartley; Ryō Hirakawa
Preceded by Phil Hanson; Robert Kubica; Yifei Ye	Winner of the 24 Hours of Le Mans; 2026; With: Mike Conway & Nyck de Vries	Succeeded by Incumbent
Awards and achievements
Preceded by Kris Meeke	Autosport Awards; Rookie of the Year; 2010	Succeeded by Paul di Resta
