= Christoph Zimmermann (engineer) =

Swiss engineer

- Born: 7 June 1968 (age 58); Zürich, Switzerland

Christoph Zimmermann (born 7 June 1968) is a Swiss engineer and former chief designer of the BMW Sauber Formula One team.

== Career ==
Zimmermann completed an apprenticeship at ABB and is a mechanical engineer by profession. He worked as a composite and model designer at Sauber in Hinwil from 1989 before moving to Swift Engineering in 1999. He returned to Sauber as head of composite design in 2000. In October 2007, Zimmermann was announced as the chief designer at BMW Sauber, succeeding Jörg Zander.

== Career timeline ==
- Designer – Sauber-Mercedes (1989–1991).
- Designer – Sauber (1992–1999).
- Senior engineer – Swift Engineering (1999–2000).
- Head of composite design – Sauber (2001–2005).
- Head of composite design – BMW Sauber (2006–2007).
- Chief designer – BMW Sauber (2008–2011).
