= Mariano Alperin =

Argentine and Australian Formula One aerodynamicist

- Born: Mariano Alperin Bruvera; 10 October 1965 (age 60); Buenos Aires, Argentina
- Employer: McLaren Racing
- Known for: Formula One aerodynamics
- Title: Head of Aerodynamic Analysis and Development

Mariano Alperin Bruvera (born 10 October 1965) is an Argentine–Australian Formula One aerodynamicist. He is currently the head of aerodynamic analysis and development for the McLaren Racing Formula One team.

== Career ==
Alperin studied physics at the University of Toulouse before specialising in aeronautical engineering at the École nationale supérieure de l’aéronautique et de l’espace (SUPAERO), one of France’s leading aerospace engineering institutions. Alperin began his career in Formula One in the early 1990s, initially working as an aerodynamicist with Automobiles Gonfaronnaises Sportives (AGS). He later joined the short-lived Lamborghini Engineering Formula One project in Modena, where he continued aerodynamic development work. In 1992 he moved to the Fondmetal Formula One team as a trackside data analyst, before becoming a race engineer in International Formula 3000 with Durango during the 1993–1994 seasons.

Alperin returned to Formula One with Minardi in 1994 as Head of Aerodynamics, working at the Fondmetal Technologies windtunnel at Casumaro. When Fondmetal took over Minardi's entire aerodynamic programme, Alperin made the switch to the newly established British American Racing team. He worked at the team for nine years and progressed from senior aerodynamicist to chief aerodynamicist when the team transitioned into Honda Racing F1. He led the team’s aerodynamics department from 2006 to 2007, leaving after a season in which the Honda RA107 encountered well-documented aerodynamic correlation challenges.

In 2008, Alperin joined the BMW Sauber F1 Team as Head of Aerodynamic Development, overseeing aerodynamic research and performance optimisation programmes at the Hinwil-based team. He remained with the team as it returned to being a private team, and in 2015 became in charge of the aerodynamics team alongside Seamus Mullarkey. Seeking a new challenge, Alperin joined the Racing Point F1 Team as Chief of Aerodynamic Technology, where he focused on the development of the team’s wind tunnel and CFD infrastructure. This work formed part of the transition into the organisation’s new factory as it evolved into the Aston Martin F1 Team.

In 2024, Alperin moved to McLaren, where he was appointed Head of Aerodynamic Analysis and Development, focusing on correlation, simulation-driven design, and aerodynamic performance tools supporting the team’s contemporary car programmes.
