= Pierre Waché =

French engineer (born 1974)

- Born: 10 December 1974 (age 51); Auchel, France
- Citizenship: French
- Education: National Polytechnic Institute of Lorraine (PhD)
- Occupation: Engineer
- Years active: 2001–present
- Employer: Red Bull Racing
- Known for: Formula One engineer
- Title: Technical Director

Pierre Waché (born 10 December 1974) is a French Formula One engineer. He is the technical director at the Red Bull Racing Formula One team.

== Career ==
Waché earned a doctorate in fluid dynamics from the National Polytechnic Institute of Lorraine, specialising in bio-mechanical engineering. After graduating, he began working in 2001 for the global tyre manufacturer Michelin in their Formula One programme, and was an engineer that was responsible for the interaction between tyres and track conditions for Formula One cars. At the end of 2006, Michelin left Formula One as a tire supplier, which resulted in Waché being recruited by BMW Sauber as a performance engineer, working with tyres and suspension.

In 2009, BMW announced that it would leave Formula One, which resulted in Waché replacing Loïc Serra as the head of vehicle performance for Sauber. In 2013, he moved to Red Bull Racing and become the chief engineer with a focus on vehicle performance; six months later, he was appointed to succeed Mark Ellis as performance director. In 2018, he took on the role of technical director being responsible for the design and production of the car, second only to Adrian Newey. Following Newey's departure for Aston Martin in 2025, Waché is now responsible for the design and production of all subsequent Red Bull challengers with the RB21 being the first post-Newey designed car and the first car to be designed by him who is overseeing all aspects of the car since Newey's departure and the first Red Bull car to not be designed by Newey since the RB2.
