= Seamus Mullarkey =

British aerodynamicist

- Born: 31 October 1964 (age 61); Singapore
- Occupation: Aerodynamicist
- Years active: 1990 - 2018
- Employer(s): Sauber Motorsport (1998 - 2018); Jordan Grand Prix (1996 - 1998)
- Known for: Formula One Aerodynamicist

Seamus Mullarkey (born 31 October 1964) is a British Formula One aerodynamicist. He is best known for holding a number of senior aerodynamic roles at Sauber Motorsport including Head of Aerodynamics and Chief Aerodynamicist.

== Career ==
Mullarkey studied aerodynamics at Imperial College London, earning a doctorate. He began his career in motorsport in 1990 with March Engineering as an aerodynamicist, before moving to Fondmetal in 1991 in a similar role. He later joined Larrousse’s UK operation (1992–1994), working across aerodynamics and data analysis. In 1995 he worked as a data analyst at GenTech, followed by a period at Galmer Engineering (1995–1996) as a software design engineer, developing engineering tools and simulation support systems.

Mullarkey returned fully to Formula One in 1996 when he joined Jordan Grand Prix, becoming Head of Aerodynamics, a position he held until 1998. In 1998 he moved to Sauber, where he spent nineteen years in a variety of senior technical roles. He initially led the team's aerodynamic programme from 1998 to 2006. Following the formation of BMW Sauber F1 Team in 2006, Mullarkey was appointed Chief Aerodynamicist, continuing to oversee the development direction of the team's aero department.

When the team returned to private ownership in 2010, he resumed the position of Head of Aerodynamics. In 2012 he stepped back from day-to-day management responsibilities to become Head of Aerodynamic Research, focusing on longer-term development methodologies and conceptual studies. He left this position at the start of 2018 and is now Chief Research Officer of cycling company Swiss Side.
