= MCG (disambiguation) =

The MCG is the Melbourne Cricket Ground.

MCG, mcg, or McG may also refer to:

== People ==
- McG (Joseph McGinty Nichol), an American film and television producer and director

== Places ==
- McGrath Airport, Alaska, US (IATA code)
- McGregor station, Texas, US (station code)

== Health and medicine ==
- Medical College of Georgia, a component of Augusta University in the USA
- Magnetocardiography, to measure the magnetic fields produced by electrical activity in the heart

== Science and technology ==
- mcg, a microgram, one-thousandth of a milligram or one millionth of a gram
- Morphological Catalogue of Galaxies (astronomy)
- Mapping class group (mathematics)
- MCWG, Meta-Certificate Working Group (previously Meta-Certificate Group) (Internet security)

== Organizations ==
- Make Cars Green, a campaign for more environmentally friendly motoring
- Geneva Citizens' Movement (French: Mouvement citoyens genevois)
- Management Consulting Group
- Manchester Craftsmen's Guild
- Mobico Group, London Stock Exchange code
- Museums Computer Group
- Muslim Consumer Group
- Monte Cook Games
