= Kinetic energy recovery system =

Automotive brake energy system

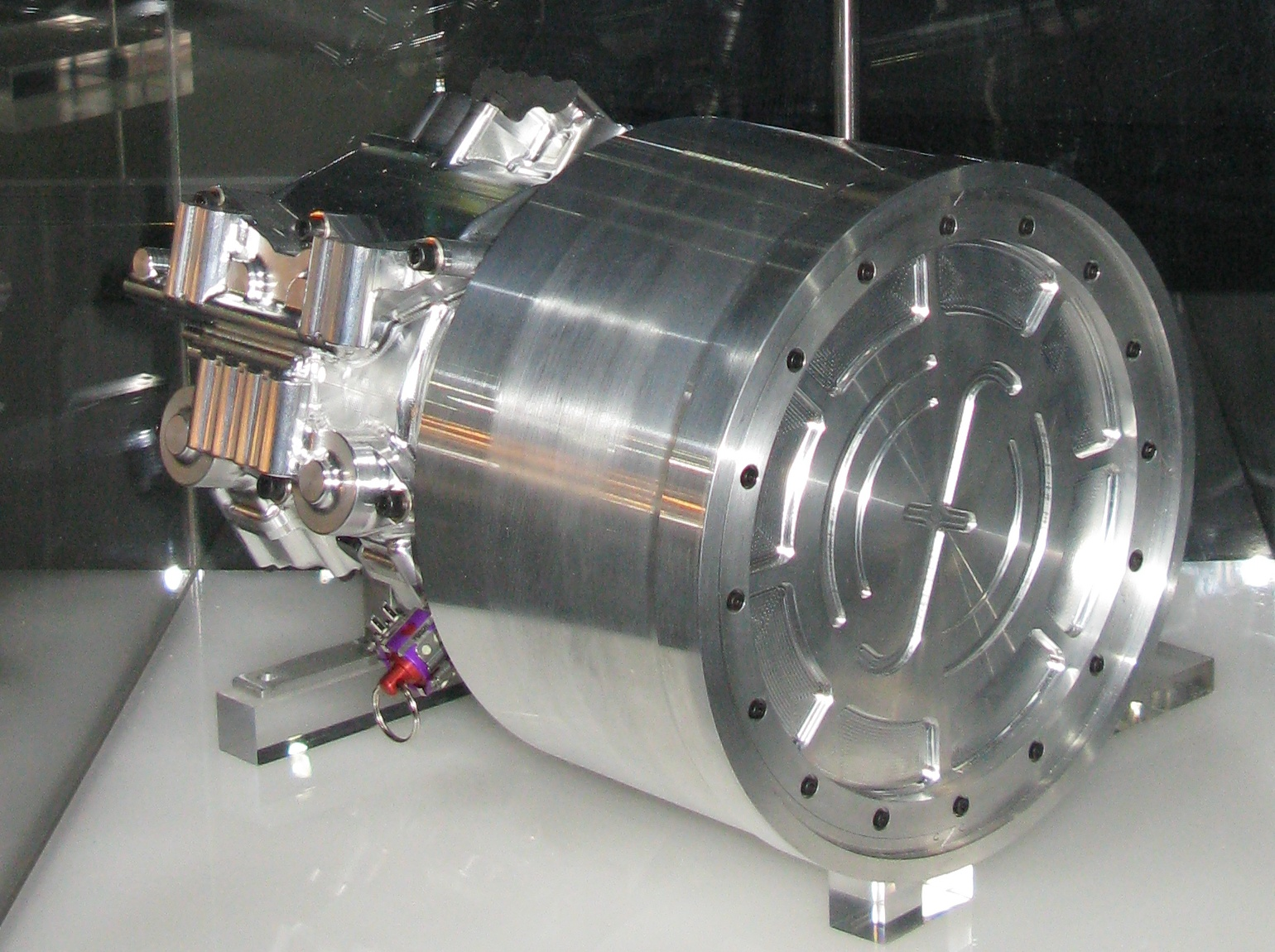
A Flybrid Systems kinetic energy recovery system.

In automotive engineering, a kinetic energy recovery system (KERS) is one that facilitates energy recovery when braking a moving vehicle. The recovered energy may be stored in a flywheel as rotational energy, or be used to generate electricity to a battery (regenerative braking). The stored energy could then be used later during acceleration. Examples include complex high end systems such as the Zytek, Flybrid, Torotrak and Xtrac used in Formula One racing and simple, easily manufactured and integrated differential based systems such as the Cambridge Passenger/Commercial Vehicle Kinetic Energy Recovery System (CPC-KERS).

Xtrac and Flybrid are both licensees of Torotrak's technologies, which employ a small and sophisticated ancillary gearbox incorporating a continuously variable transmission (CVT). The CPC-KERS is similar as it also forms part of the driveline assembly. However, the whole mechanism including the flywheel sits entirely in the vehicle's hub (looking like a drum brake). In the CPC-KERS, a differential replaces the CVT and transfers torque between the flywheel, drive wheel and road wheel.

== Use in motorsport ==
=== History ===
The first of these systems to be revealed was the Flybrid. This system weighs 24 kg (53 lbs) and has an energy capacity of 400 kJ after allowing for internal losses. A maximum power boost of 60 kW (81.6 PS, 80.4 HP) for 6.67 seconds is available. The 240 mm (9.4 in) diameter flywheel weighs 5.0 kg (11 lbs) and revolves at up to 64,500 rpm. Maximum torque at the flywheel is 18 Nm (13.3 ftlbs), and the torque at the gearbox connection is correspondingly higher for the change in speed. The system occupies a volume of 13 litres.

Already in 2006, a first KERS system based on supercapacitors has been studied at EPFL (Ecole Polytechnique Fédérale de Lausanne) in the framework of the development of the "Formula S2000". A 180 kJ system has been developed in collaboration with other institutes.

Two minor incidents were reported during testing of various KERS systems in 2008. The first occurred when the Red Bull Racing team tested their KERS battery for the first time in July: it malfunctioned and caused a fire scare that led to the team's factory being evacuated. The second was less than a week later when a BMW Sauber mechanic was given an electric shock when he touched Christian Klien's KERS-equipped car during a test at the Jerez circuit.

=== Formula One ===
Formula One has stated that they support responsible solutions to the world's environmental challenges, and the FIA allowed the use of 60 kW (82 PS; 80 bhp) KERS in the regulations for the 2009 Formula One season. Teams began testing systems in 2008: energy can either be stored as mechanical energy (as in a flywheel) or as electrical energy (as in a battery or supercapacitor).

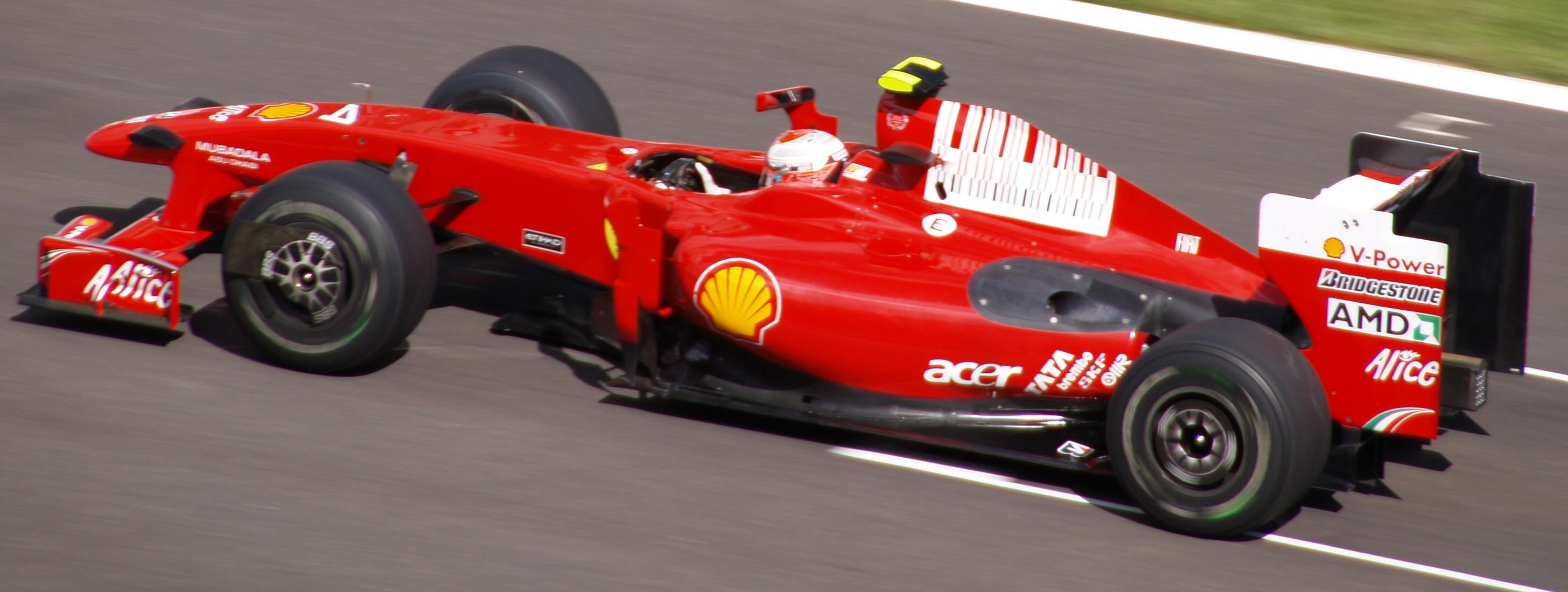
Kimi Räikkönen took the lead of the 2009 Belgian Grand Prix with a KERS-aided overtake and subsequently won the race.

With the introduction of KERS in the 2009 season, only four teams used it at some point in the season: Ferrari, Renault, BMW and McLaren. Eventually, during the season, Renault and BMW stopped using the system. Nick Heidfeld was the first driver to take a podium position with a KERS equipped car, at the Malaysian Grand Prix. McLaren Mercedes became the first team to win an F1 GP using a KERS equipped car when Lewis Hamilton won the Hungarian Grand Prix on July 26, 2009. Their second KERS equipped car finished fifth. At the following race, Lewis Hamilton became the first driver to take pole position with a KERS car, his teammate, Heikki Kovalainen qualifying second. This was also the first instance of an all KERS front row. On August 30, 2009, Kimi Räikkönen won the Belgian Grand Prix with his KERS equipped Ferrari. It was the first time that KERS contributed directly to a race victory, with second placed Giancarlo Fisichella claiming "Actually, I was quicker than Kimi. He only took me because of KERS at the beginning".

Although KERS was still legal in F1 in the 2010 season, all the teams had agreed not to use it. New rules for the 2011 F1 season which raised the minimum weight limit of the car and driver by 20 kg to 640 kg, along with the FOTA teams agreeing to the use of KERS devices once more, meant that KERS returned for the 2011 season. Use of KERS was still optional as in the 2009 season; and at the start of the 2011 season three teams chose not to use it.

WilliamsF1 developed their own flywheel-based KERS system but decided not to use it in their F1 cars due to packaging issues, and have instead developed their own electrical KERS system. However, they set up Williams Hybrid Power to sell their developments. In 2012 it was announced that the Audi Le Mans R18 hybrid cars would use Williams Hybrid Power.

Since 2014, the power capacity of the KERS units has increased from 60 kilowatts (80 bhp) to 120 kilowatts (160 bhp). This was introduced to balance the sport's move from 2.4 litre V8 engines to 1.6 litre V6 turbo engines.

=== Working diagram for KERS ===
The operation process of KERS in Formula One

=== Autopart makers ===
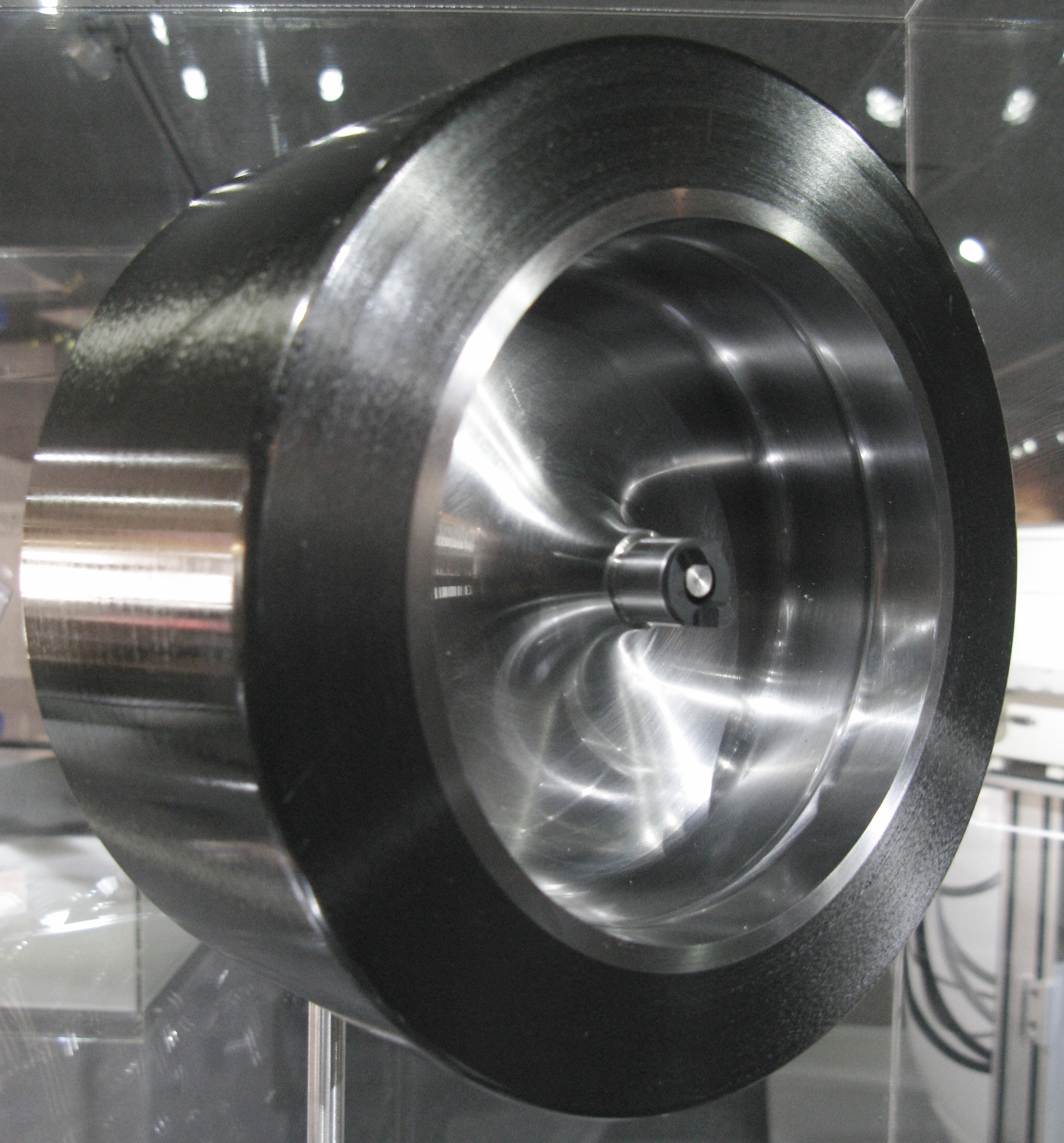
A KERS flywheel.

Bosch Motorsport Service is developing a KERS for use in motor racing. These electricity storage systems for hybrid and engine functions include a lithium-ion battery with scalable capacity or a flywheel, a four to eight kilogram electric motor (with a maximum power level of 60 kW (81 hp)), as well as the KERS controller for power and battery management. Bosch also offers a range of electric hybrid systems for commercial and light-duty applications.

=== Car manufacturers ===
Several automakers have been testing KERS systems. At the 2008 1000 km of Silverstone, Peugeot Sport unveiled the Peugeot 908 HY, a hybrid electric variant of the diesel 908, with KERS. Peugeot planned to campaign the car in the 2009 Le Mans Series season, although it was not allowed to score championship points.

McLaren began testing of their KERS system in September 2008 at Jerez in preparation for the 2009 F1 season, although at that time it was not yet known if they would be operating an electrical or mechanical system. In November 2008, it was announced that Freescale Semiconductor would collaborate with McLaren Electronic Systems to further develop its KERS for McLaren's Formula One cars from 2010 onwards. Both parties believed this collaboration would improve McLaren's KERS system and help the system to transfer its technology to road cars.

Toyota has used a supercapacitor for regeneration on its Supra HV-R hybrid race car that won the Tokachi 24-Hour endurance race in July 2007. This Supra became the first hybrid car in the history of motorsport to win such a race.

At the NAIAS 2011, Porsche unveiled a RSR variant of their Porsche 918 concept car which uses a flywheel-based KERS that sits beside the driver in the passenger compartment and boosts the dual electric motors driving the front wheels and the 565 BHP V8 gasoline engine driving the rear to a combined power output of 767 BHP. This system has many problems including the imbalance caused to the vehicle due to the flywheel. Porsche is currently developing an electrical storage system.

In 2011, Mazda has announced i-ELOOP, a system which uses a variable-voltage alternator to convert kinetic energy to electric power during deceleration. The energy, stored in a double-layer capacitor, is used to supply power needed by vehicle electrical systems. When used in conjunction with Mazda's start-stop system, i-Stop, the company claims fuel savings of up to 10%.

Bosch and PSA Peugeot Citroën have developed a hybrid system that uses hydraulics as a way to transfer energy to and from a compressed nitrogen tank. An up to 45% reduction in fuel consumption is claimed, corresponding to 2.9 L/100 km (81 mpg, 69 g CO_{2}/km) on the NEDC cycle for a compact frame like Peugeot 208. The system is claimed to be much more affordable than competing electric and flywheel systems and was expected on road cars by 2016 but was abandoned in 2015.

In 2020, FIAT launched the series of the FIAT Panda mild-hybrid with KERS technology.

Roewe (owned by the Chinese automaker SAIC Motor) also uses KERS technology.

=== Motorcycles ===
KTM racing boss Harald Bartol revealed that the factory raced with a secret kinetic energy recovery system fitted to Tomoyoshi Koyama's motorcycle during the 125cc race of the 2008 Valencian Community motorcycle Grand Prix. Koyama finished 7th. The system was later ruled illegal and thus was banned. The Lit C-1 electric motorcycle will also use a KERS as a regenerative braking system.

=== Bicycles ===
KERS is also possible on a bicycle. The EPA, working with students from the University of Michigan, developed the hydraulic Regenerative Brake Launch Assist (RBLA)

This has also been demonstrated by mounting a flywheel on a bike frame and connecting it with a CVT to the back wheel. By shifting the gear, 20% of the kinetic energy can be stored in the flywheel, ready to give an acceleration boost by reshifting the gear.

=== Races ===
Automobile Club de l'Ouest, the organizer behind the annual 24 Hours of Le Mans event and the Le Mans Series, has promoted the use of kinetic energy recovery systems in the LMP1 class since the late 2000s. Peugeot was the first manufacturer to unveil a fully functioning LMP1 car in the form of the 908 HY at the 2008 Autosport 1000 km race at Silverstone.

The 2011 24 Hours of Le Mans saw Hope Racing enter with a Flybrid Systems mechanical KERS, to be the first car ever to compete at the event with a hybrid. The system consisted of high speed slipping clutches which transfer torque to and from the vehicle, coupled to a 60,000 rpm flywheel.

Audi and Toyota both developed LMP1 cars with kinetic energy recovery systems for the 2012 and 2013 24 Hours of Le Mans. The Audi R18 e-tron quattro uses a flywheel-based system, while the Toyota TS030 Hybrid uses a supercapacitor-based system. When Porsche announced its return to Le Mans in 2014, it also unveiled an LMP1 car with a kinetic energy recovery system. The Porsche 919 Hybrid, introduced in 2014, uses a battery system, in contrast to the previous Porsche 911 GT3 R Hybrid that used a flywheel system.

== Use in public transport ==
=== London buses ===
A KERS using a carbon fibre flywheel, originally developed for the Williams Formula One racing team, has been modified for retrofitting to existing London double-decker buses. Buses (500 from the Go-Ahead Group) were fitted with this technology from 2014 to 2016, anticipating a fuel efficiency improvement of approximately 20%. The team who developed the technology were awarded the Dewar Trophy of the Royal Automobile Club in 2015.

=== Parry People Mover ===
Parry People Mover railcars use a small engine and large flywheel to move. The system also supports regenerative braking.

== See also ==
- Regenerative brake
- Make Cars Green
