= Islamic dietary laws =

Islamic food code

Islamic dietary laws are laws that Muslims follow in their diet. Islamic jurisprudence specifies which foods are halal (Arabic: حَلَال, romanized: ḥalāl, lit. 'lawful') and which are haram (Arabic: حَرَام, romanized: ḥarām, lit. 'unlawful'). The dietary laws are found in the Quran, the holy book of Islam, as well as in collections of traditions attributed to the Islamic prophet Muhammad.

Herbivores, cud-chewing animals like cattle, deer, sheep, goats, and antelope are some examples of animals that are halal only if they are treated like sentient beings and slaughtered painlessly while reciting the basmala and takbir. If the animal is treated poorly or tortured while being slaughtered, the meat is haram. Forbidden food substances include alcohol, pork, frog, carrion, and animals that died due to illness, injury, stunning, poisoning, or slaughtering not in the name of God.

== Quranic foundation ==
The Quran, which is the divine source, along with the life and teachings of Muhammad (sunnah), explicitly state foods that are prohibited (haram) and permissible (halal). These rules of living are believed as essentials for religious observances, practical life, and the health and well-being.

=== Etymology ===
The Arabic word halal literally translates to 'lawful' or 'permitted'. In Sharia law, this refers to what is lawful by Allah. The word haram translates to prohibited and one who breaks this are considered sinful.

== Rules ==
Based on Islamic scriptural injunctions, Islamic dietary laws are classified as halāl (permissible), harām (forbidden), and mashbūh (dubious).

=== Halal ===
Livestock or cattle, i.e., grazing beasts, are lawful except those that are explicitly prohibited. Hunting is prohibited during "the pilgrimage". Islamic jurisprudence states that all things are essentially halal unless Sharia law states otherwise. The Quran explicitly states numerous halal food items:

- Cattle (sheep, goats, camels, buffaloes)
- Land-hunted animals
- Meat of animals slaughtered by People of the Book
- Dates, olives, pomegranates, grapes, and various fruits
- Animals slaughtered in the name of Allah
- Cattle's milk and honey
- Grains
- Marine hunting (seafood)

==== Seafood ====
Seafood is generally permitted in most of the schools of Islam, based on their interpretation of the Quran 5:96; the Hanafi school of Islamic jurisprudence forbids consumption of seafood other than true "fish", and considers other sea creatures, such as crustaceans, to be makruh.

Some Hanafi scholars are in disagreement over whether or not prawns and shrimp constitute as true "fish"; comparatively, many scholars do agree that crocodile, crab, lobster, or any mollusk is not.

==== Mashbooh ====
Foods whose halal status is uncertain or debated may be classified as mashbooh (Arabic: مشبوه; 'doubtful'). This includes foods that are seemingly halal but of an unknown source and ingredients for which the halal status is subject to differing interpretation, such as extract from brewer's yeast, which is nonalcoholic but derived from the production of alcohol.

==== Ritual slaughter ====
In Islamic law, dhabīḥah (Arabic: ذَبِيحَة) is the prescribed method of slaughter for halal animals. It consists of a swift, deep incision to the throat with a very sharp knife, cutting the wind pipe, jugular veins and carotid arteries on both sides but leaving the spinal cord intact.

The carcass should be hung upside down for long enough to be free of blood.

Slaughtered animals must be acknowledged as sentient beings and slaughtered painlessly while reciting the Basmala and Takbir. The butcher is required to call upon the name of Allah (Bismillah) individually for each animal. If the animal is treated poorly, or tortured while being slaughtered, the meat is haram.

Conversely, animals slaughtered for food may not be killed by being boiled or electrocuted. Animals strangled or beaten to death, or that died by falling or due to a wild animal are also expressly forbidden.

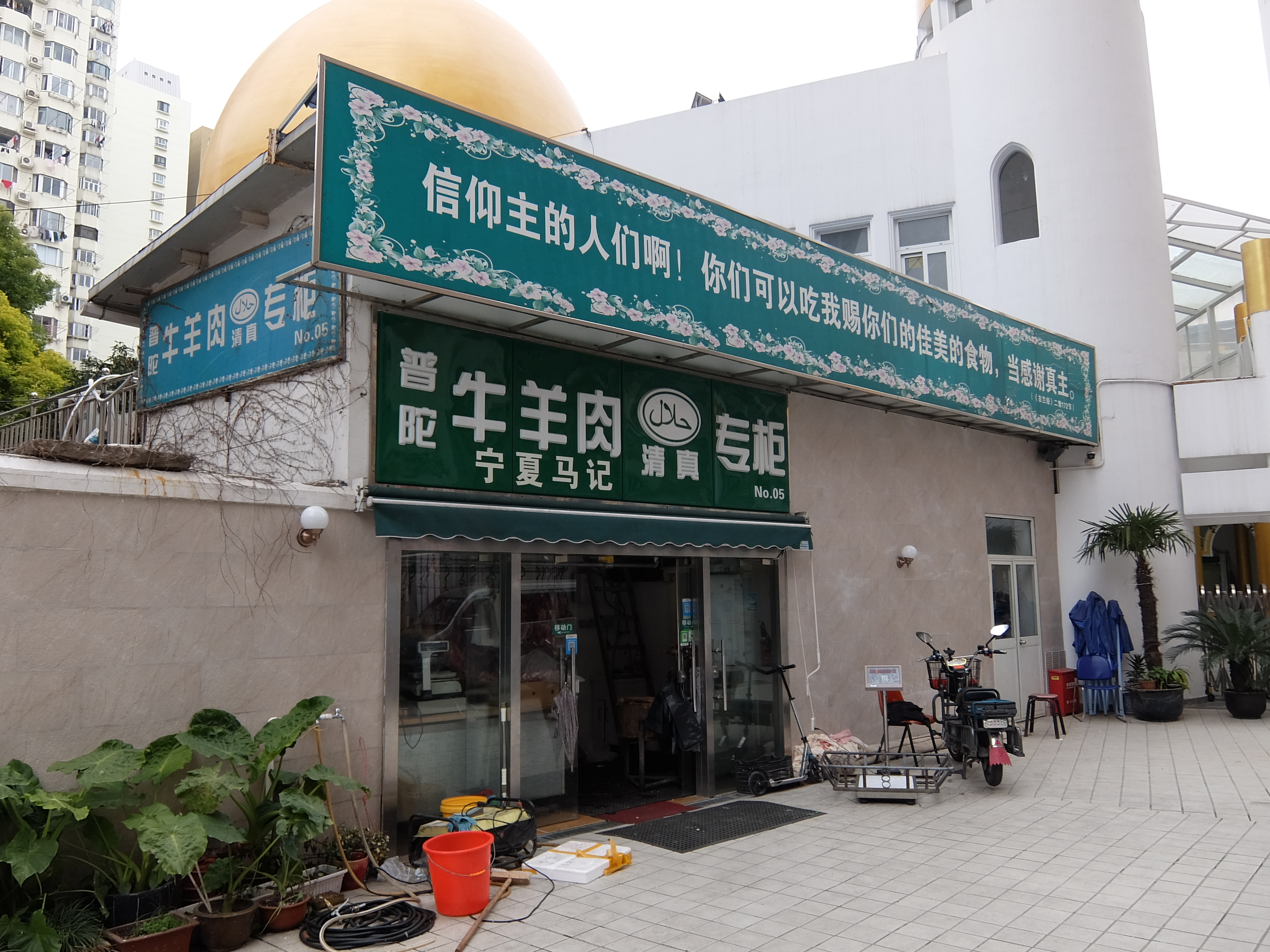
Halal butcher shop in Shanghai, China

=== Haram ===
A variety of substances are also considered unlawful (haram) for humans to consume and therefore, the consumption of them is forbidden by the Sharia (Islamic law). Haram is typically classified as Haram li-dhatih (textual haram) and Haram li-ghayrih (derivative rules).

Textual haram are things explicitly declared in scriptures. Derivative rules are not explicitly stated but prohibited based on Sharia rules and regulations.

The Quran states 13 items that are haram:

1. Dead animals (carrion) – animals must die per Islamic slaughter.
2. Blood – specifically refers to flowing blood, however, the liver, spleen, and the blood remaining in meat or veins after slaughter are permitted.
3. Pork – all parts of a pig are prohibited.
4. Animals slaughtered in the name other than Allah.
5. Strangulated animals
6. Animals killed by injury
7. Fallen dead animals
8. Animals that die from another animal's horn
9. Animals killed by another animal
10. Animals slaughtered at the altar of idols
11. Wine and intoxicating substances
12. Animals incorrectly slaughtered
13. Hunting in Ihram

Differences of opinion exist as to whether the consumption of horses, mules, and donkeys is permitted. In the Quran, one finds this verse: "And (He has created) horses, mules, and donkeys, for you to ride and use for show; and He has created (other) things of which you have no knowledge". Some scholars have interpreted this as limiting the named animals for riding and show only, prohibiting their consumption. Predatory animals, such as lions, tigers, falcons and hawks are forbidden as well.

However, a person would not be considered guilty of sin in a situation where the lack of any alternative creates an undesired necessity to consume that which is otherwise unlawful, such as a famine.

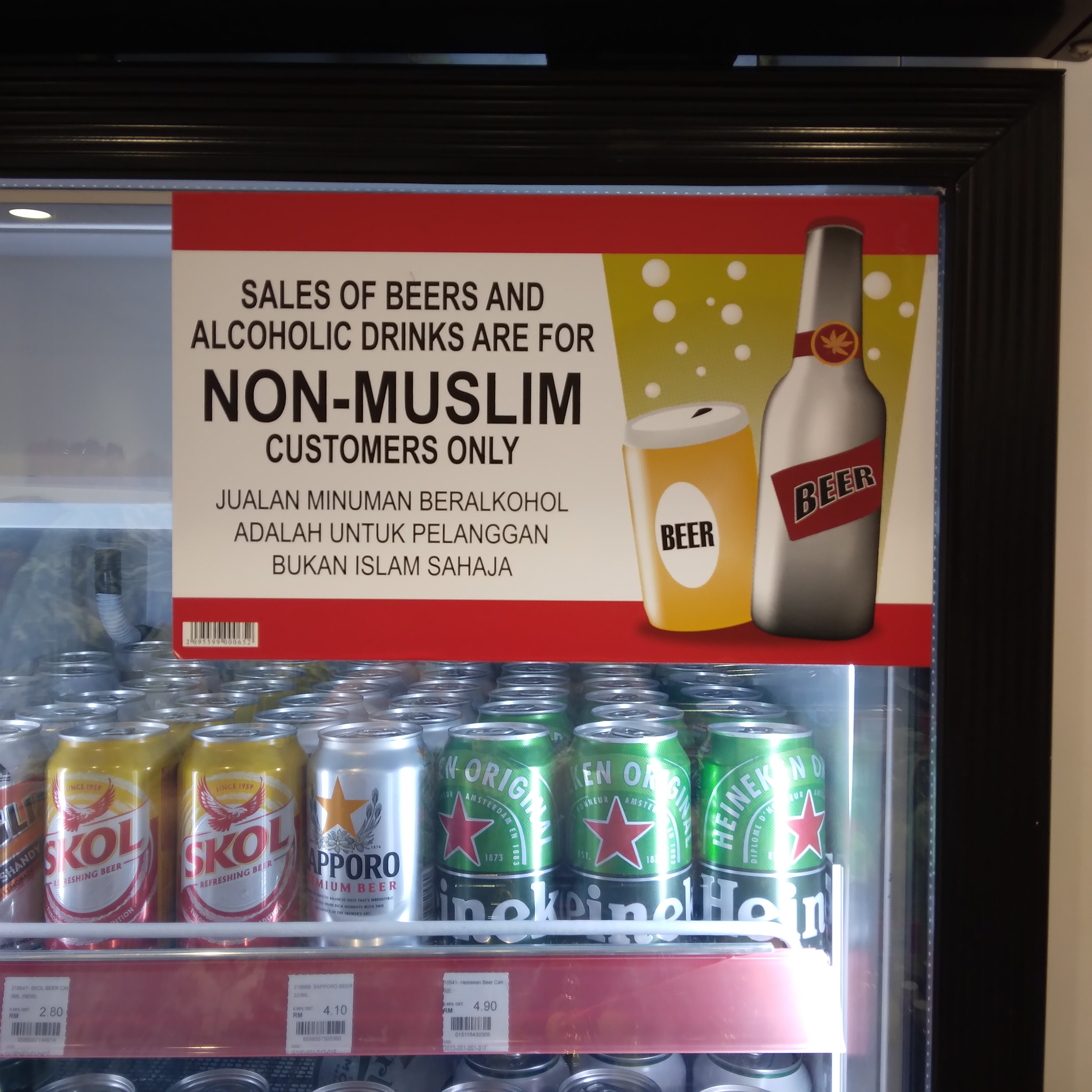
Sign on a refrigerator in a convenience store in Malaysia notifying that sales of beer are for non-Muslim customers only

== Islamic dietary laws during Ramadan ==
During Ramadan, the ninth month on the Muslim calendar and considered the holy month of fasting, Muslims take time for introspection, prayer, and reading of the Quran. During this period, Muslims focus on self restraint or sawm (Arabic: to refrain), which is one of the five pillars of Islam. During Ramadan, between dawn and dusk, worshippers abstain from food, drink, sexual activity, and immoral behavior. After dusk, Muslims break their fast during a meal called iftar with family and friends. Sawm can be negated by breaking fast, however, the lost can be made up with one extra day of fasting. The end of the Ramadan fast is the celebration of Eid-al-Fitr (Feast of Fast-Breaking), one of the two major religious holidays on the Muslim calendar.

== Global food certifications ==
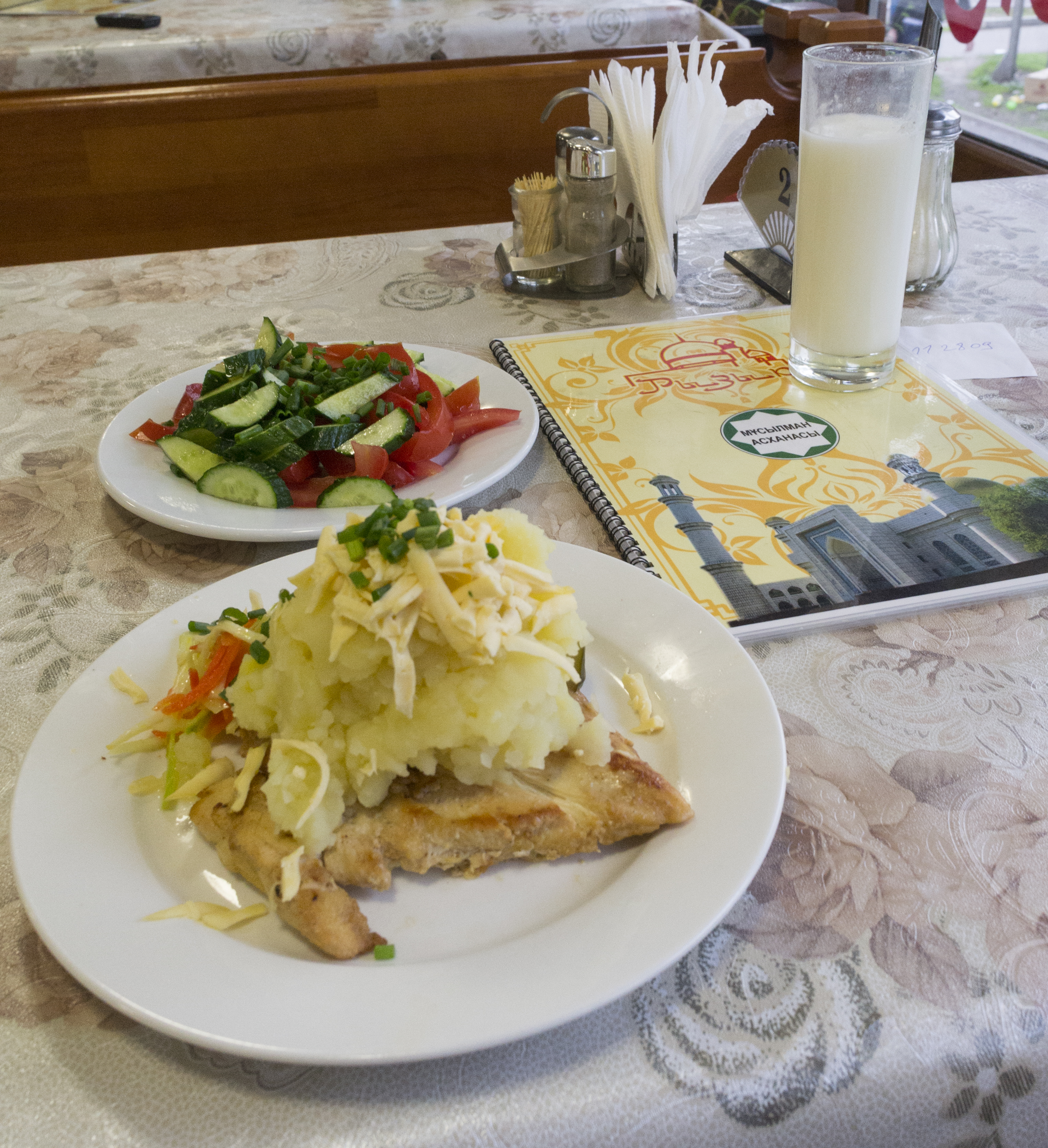
Halal restaurant in Almaty, Kazakhstan. Yurta (potatoes with meat) and kumis are made of ingredients considered halal.

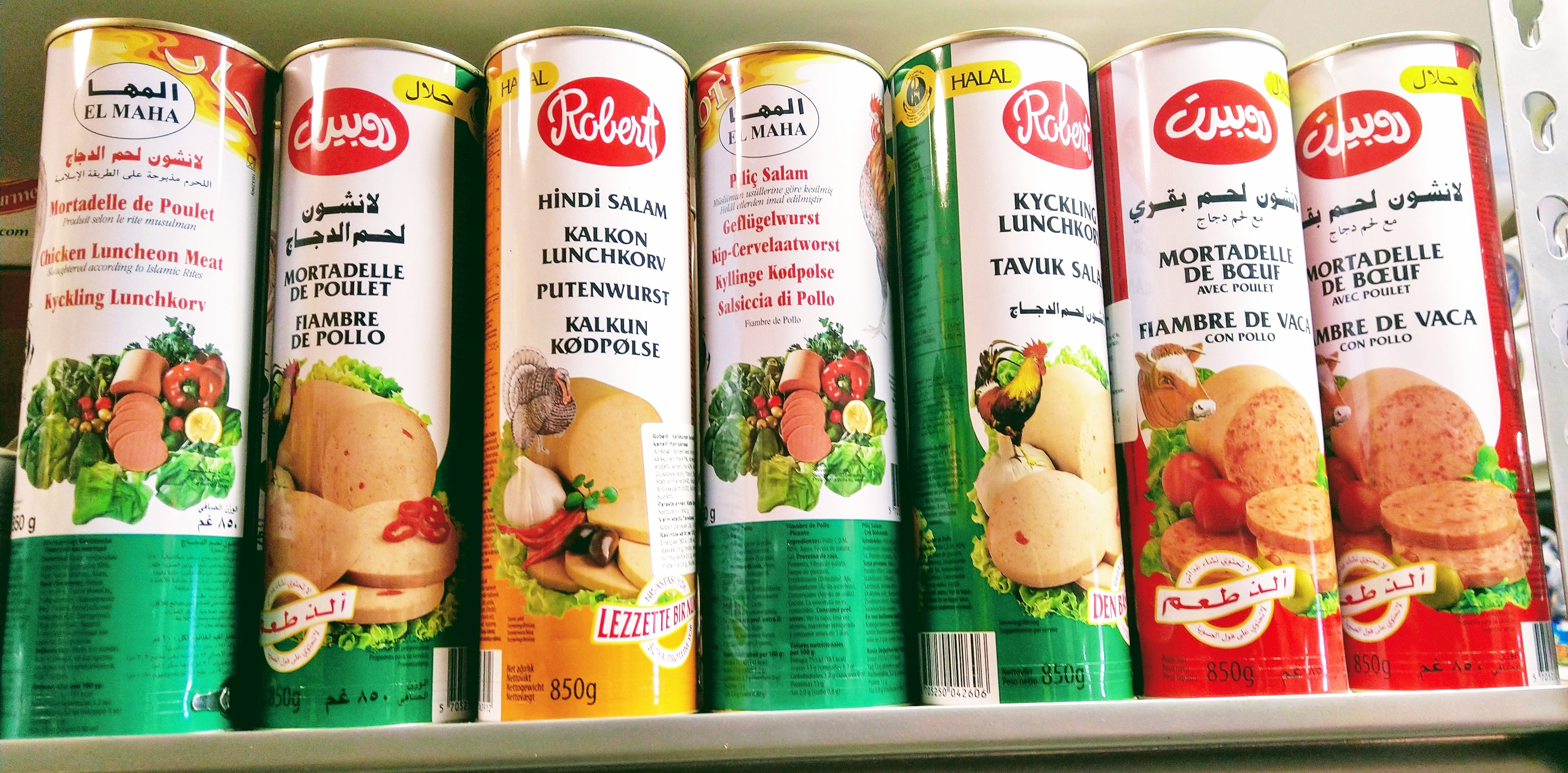
Halal food products in a shop in Finland

Since the turn of the 21st century, there have been efforts to create organizations that certify food products as halal for Muslim consumers in the US.

Since 1991, some mainstream manufacturers of soups, grains, cosmetics, pharmaceuticals, prepared foods, and other products, as well as hotels, restaurants, airlines, hospitals, and other service providers have pursued the halal market. These companies purchase halal-certified products. This can allow companies to export products to most Middle Eastern countries and Southeast Asian countries. The oldest and most well-known halal certifier in the United States is called the Islamic Services of America.

In Europe, several organizations have been created in order to certify the halal products. A 2009 survey published by a French association of Muslim Consumers (ASIDCOM) shows that the market of halal products has been developed in a chaotic way in Europe. The European certification organizations do not have a common definition of "halal" nor agreed upon control procedures and traceability. The controls implemented by individual agencies are all very different: they can go from an annual audit of the slaughterhouse, to checking each production with permanent controls in place and on-going independent monitoring.

In South Africa, most chicken products have a halal stamp. The South African National Halal Authority (SANHA) issues certificates and products bearing this logo range from water, snacks, and even meat-free products (which may contain non-halal ingredients). The South African National Halal Authority also licenses the usage of the Halal logo in restaurants where the food is halal, in addition to no alcohol or pork products being served.

In Singapore, halal certification is managed by Majlis Ugama Islam Singapura (MUIS), also known as the Islamic Religious Council of Singapore. They are the sole custodian of Halal Certification in Singapore.

In Malaysia, the Department of Islamic Development Malaysia (JAKIM) is the agency responsible for halal certification in Malaysia.

== Availability of halal food in non-Islamic regions ==
In 2013, the halal market was estimated to be 26% of world food trade. The Global Halal Institute has a list of Halal certifiers that are approved by most Muslim countries with dietary import restrictions for companies.

=== Europe and Asia ===
In the United Kingdom, China, Indonesia, Malaysia, or Singapore, halal fried chicken restaurants having thousands of outlets, some but not all of which, serve halal foods such as the Nando's, Brown's Chicken, and Crown Fried Chicken companies.

== See also ==
- Islamic vegetarianism
- Comparison of Islamic and Jewish dietary laws
- Dhabihah
- Dietary laws
- Halal
- List of diets
- Makruh
- Muslim Consumer Group (MCG)
- Religious restrictions on the consumption of pork
- Ritual slaughter
- Taboo food and drink
