= 2008 Japanese Grand Prix =

Formula One motor race

Coordinates: 35°22′18″N 138°55′36″E

Race 16 of 18 in the 2008 Formula One World Championship
← Previous race	Next race →

Race details
- Date: 12 October 2008
- Official name: 2008 Formula 1 Fuji Television Japanese Grand Prix
- Location: Fuji Speedway, Oyama, Sunto District, Shizuoka, Japan
- Course: Permanent racing facility
- Course length: 4.563 km (2.835 miles)
- Distance: 67 laps, 305.416 km (189.777 miles)
- Weather: Cloudy with temperatures reaching up to 17 °C (63 °F)

Pole position
Driver	(United Kingdom) Lewis Hamilton	McLaren-Mercedes
- Time: 1:18.404

Fastest lap
Driver	(Brazil) Felipe Massa	Ferrari
- Time: 1:18.426 on lap 55 (lap record)

Podium
First	(Spain) Fernando Alonso	Renault
Second	(Poland) Robert Kubica	BMW Sauber
Third	(Finland) Kimi Räikkönen	Ferrari

The 2008 Japanese Grand Prix (officially the 2008 Formula 1 Fuji Television Japanese Grand Prix) was a Formula One motor race held on 12 October 2008, at the Fuji Speedway, Oyama, Japan. It was the 16th race of the 2008 Formula One World Championship. Fernando Alonso for the Renault team won the 67-lap race from fourth position on the starting grid, the last win for Renault as a constructor. Robert Kubica finished second for BMW Sauber, and Kimi Räikkönen third for Ferrari.

Lewis Hamilton, the eventual Drivers' Champion, led the Championship going into the race, and started from pole position alongside Räikkönen. Hamilton's McLaren teammate Heikki Kovalainen began from third, next to Alonso. At the first corner Hamilton braked late, forcing Räikkönen wide. Hamilton was later given a penalty, and was criticised by the British racing press for overaggressive driving. Ferrari driver Felipe Massa, Hamilton's principal Championship rival, was penalised after an incident on lap two in which he touched Hamilton's car, causing it to spin. The incident dropped Hamilton to the back of the field, from where he was unable to regain a points scoring position. Massa later collided with Sébastien Bourdais of Toro Rosso. Bourdais was penalised after the race, and demoted from sixth to tenth position. The penalty prompted widespread criticism from the racing media and ex-drivers.

The victory was Alonso's second consecutive win; he started from 15th on the grid to win the Singapore Grand Prix two weeks prior and would be his last until the 2010 Bahrain Grand Prix. Kubica held off a determined attack from Räikkönen in the closing laps to take second place. Massa's seventh place narrowed his gap to Hamilton in the Drivers' Championship to five points. Ferrari established a seven-point lead over the McLaren team in the Constructors' Championship, with two races of the season remaining.

== Background ==
The 2008 Japanese Grand Prix was the 16th round in the 2008 Formula One World Championship and took place on 12 October 2008, at the 2.835 mi (4.562 km) Fuji Speedway, in Oyama, Japan. The Grand Prix was contested by 20 drivers, in ten teams of two.

Prior to the race, McLaren driver Lewis Hamilton led the Drivers' Championship with 84 points, and Ferrari driver Felipe Massa was second with 77 points. Behind them in the Drivers' Championship, Robert Kubica was third with 64 points in a BMW Sauber, and Massa's Ferrari teammate Kimi Räikkönen was fourth with 57 points. Kubica's teammate Nick Heidfeld was fifth with 56 points. In the Constructors' Championship, McLaren–Mercedes were leading with 135 points, one point ahead of their rivals Ferrari, whom they had overtaken at the previous race. BMW Sauber were third with 120 points. In the battle for fourth place, Renault had 51 points, five points ahead of Toyota.

A botched pit stop at the Singapore Grand Prix had demoted Massa from first position to the back of field. Ferrari decided to give up pitstop light system and revert to the commonly used lollipop man. With three races remaining in the Championship and a seven-point deficit, Massa remained confident about his title chances: "If you look at what happened to me in Singapore where my gap went from one point to seven so suddenly, then you have to consider it could easily go the other way as well." Hamilton emphasised the value that a conservative racing strategy could hold for his title chances:

I actually think Singapore was a good learning experience: there was less pressure to achieve a victory because of the unusual circumstances, which meant I was actually able to start thinking of the world championship. I hate driving for points, but I think we can all see the benefit of that approach at the moment.

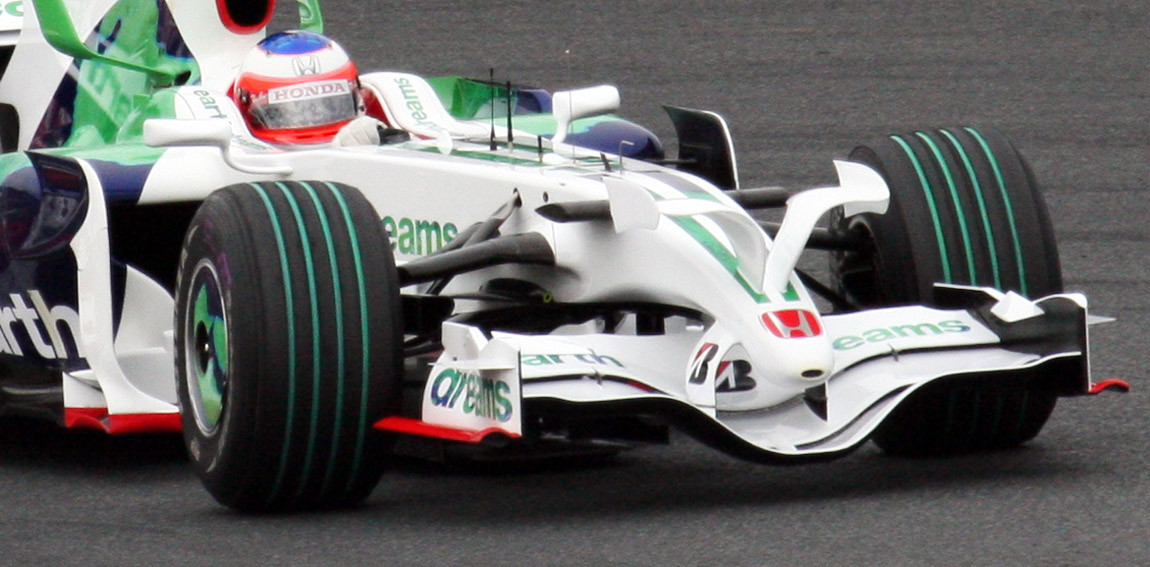
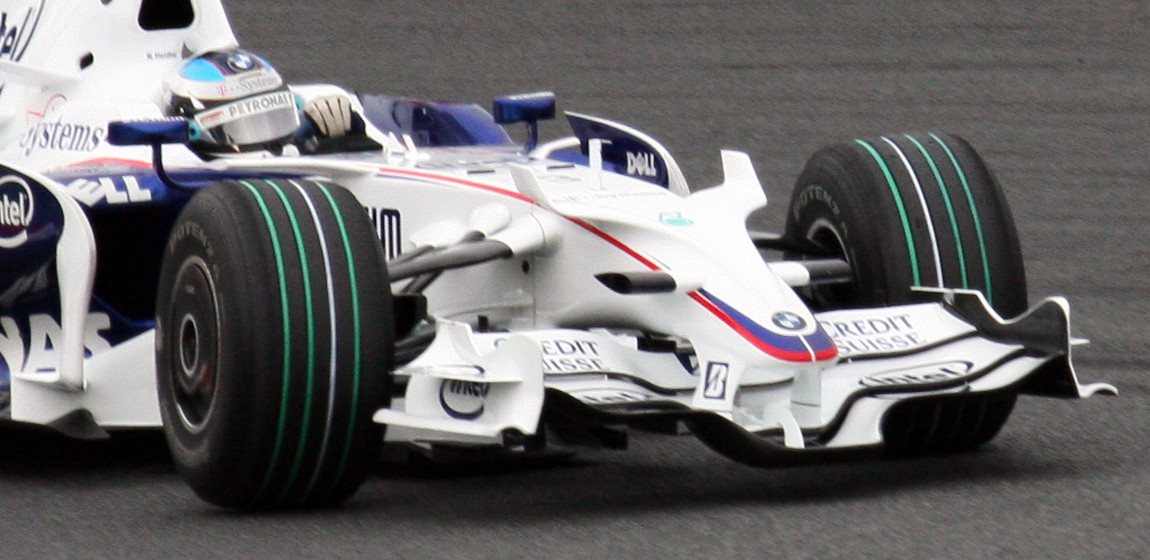
Rubens Barrichello (top) and Nick Heidfeld (bottom) with hard and soft green-grooved tyres, respectively

Fernando Alonso's victory at the Singapore Grand Prix was his first Formula One win since rejoining the Renault team, after driving for McLaren in 2007. After qualifying in 15th and making an early pit stop, Alonso had managed to jump to the front of the race when his teammate Nelson Piquet Jr. crashed. Left with no opportunity to pit, the frontrunners had to delay their stops until the damage was cleared, allowing the heavily fuelled Alonso to move to the front once they did so. Though Alonso questioned whether his Renault team could match the pace of Ferrari and McLaren at Fuji, he said "We must remain focussed and try to repeat our level of performance from Singapore to fight at the front." Renault's technical director Bob Bell said that the team's improvement from the start of the season was encouraging, but "we recognise that we're not going to overhaul McLaren and Ferrari this season". Bell said that the objective for the last races was to win more Grands Prix and, importantly, secure fourth position in the Constructors' Championship from Toyota.

The Fédération Internationale de l'Automobile (FIA), the sport's governing body, launched the Formula One component of their Make Cars Green campaign at the Japanese Grand Prix. For the weekend, the grooves in the tyres were painted green to promote environmentally friendly driving. FIA president Max Mosley said "The FIA is determined to ensure that future investment in motor sport will also help drive the development of technologies that will benefit the public at large." As is normal for a Formula One race, Bridgestone brought two different tyre compounds to the race; the softer of the two marked by a single white stripe down one of the grooves.

== Practice ==
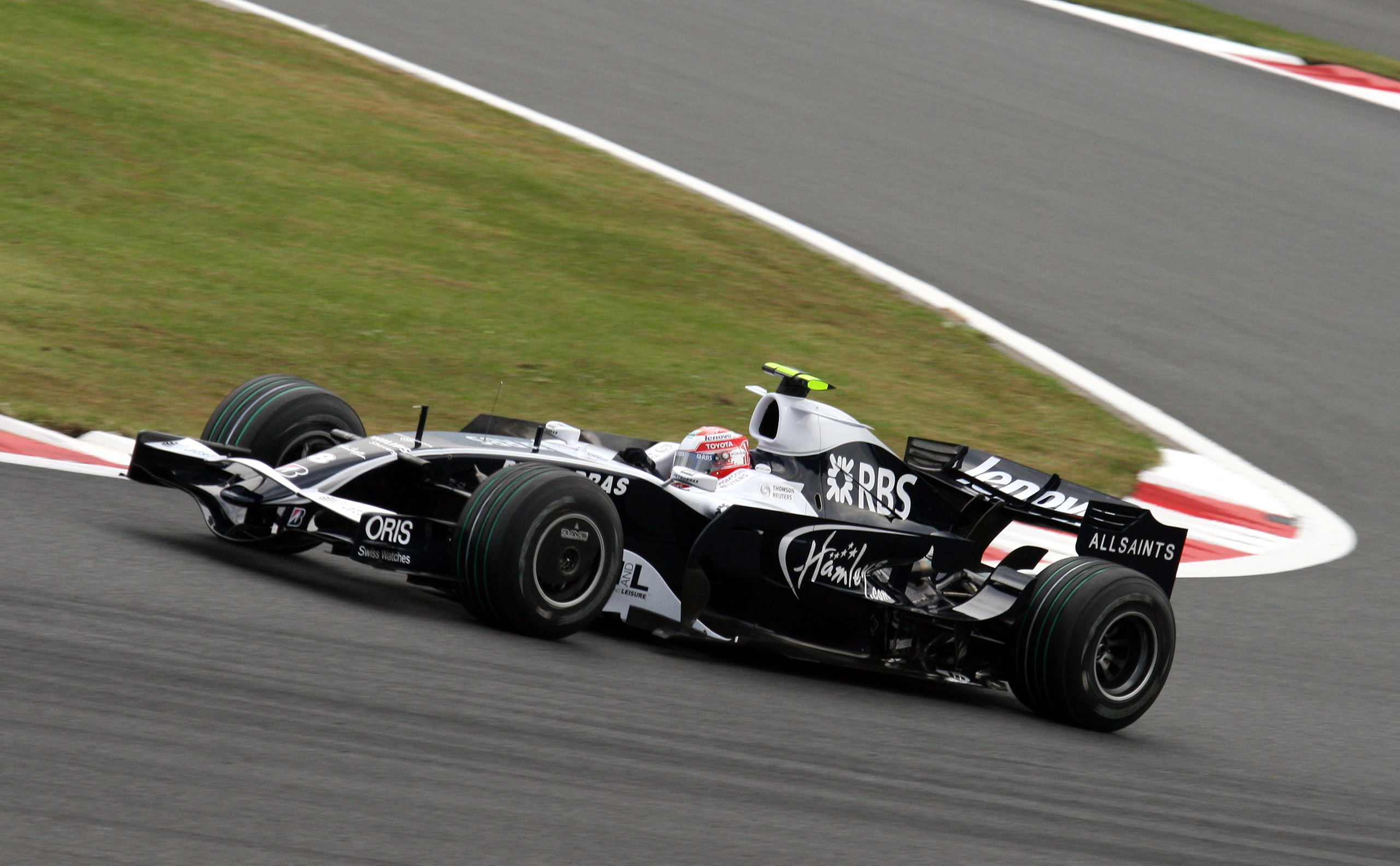
Home driver Kazuki Nakajima qualified ahead of teammate Nico Rosberg, in 14th.

Three practice sessions were held before the Sunday race—two on Friday, and a third on Saturday. The Friday morning and afternoon sessions each lasted 90 minutes. The third session was held on Saturday morning and lasted an hour. The Friday sessions were held in dry and sunny conditions. Hamilton was quickest in the first session, with a time of 1:18.910 that was less than two-tenths of a second faster than Massa. McLaren driver Heikki Kovalainen was just off Massa's pace; Räikkönen, Alonso and Piquet rounded out the top six, still within a second of Hamilton's time. In the second practice session, Timo Glock, of Toyota, was fastest with a time of 1:18.383, ahead of Alonso, Hamilton, Massa, Räikkönen and Red Bull driver Mark Webber. The top seventeen drivers set times within a second of Glock's fastest lap, indicating a competitive field. Honda tried the new traffic light system, to inform the driver when to pull away from their pitstop, for the first time. The Saturday morning session was held on a damp track, where grip was poor and many drivers were forced to use the run-off areas after sliding off the track. Kubica was quickest with his final lap of the session at 1:25.087; Glock, Piquet, Nick Heidfeld of BMW, Kazuki Nakajima of Williams, Red Bull driver David Coulthard, and Massa rounded out the top seven positions. Hamilton managed only eleventh, but was ahead of Kovalainen and Räikkönen, in 16th and 17th positions, respectively. Both Adrian Sutil and Giancarlo Fisichella of Force India spent most of the session in their garage, suffering numerous mechanical problems.

== Qualifying ==
The qualifying session on Saturday afternoon was split into three parts. The first part ran for 20 minutes, and cars that finished the session 16th or lower were eliminated from qualifying. The second part of qualifying lasted 15 minutes and eliminated cars that finished in positions 11 to 15. The final part of qualifying determined the positions from first to tenth, and decided pole position. Cars which failed to make the final session could refuel before the race, so ran lighter in those sessions. Cars which competed in the final session of qualifying were not allowed to refuel before the race, and as such carried more fuel than in the previous sessions.

A shame. Today I was the quickest man on track but at the wrong moment. In [the third session], I never had the right amount of grip from both sets of tyres that I used. On my first run I was a bit cautious on my "out" lap and so suffered in the first sector, making a mistake at Turn 3. On the second run, I did the opposite and found myself without grip at the end of the lap. So, I've ended up fifth on the grid, which is definitely not an easy place to be.

— Felipe Massa, following the third qualifying session.

Hamilton clinched his sixth pole position of the season with a lap time of 1:18.404. He was joined on the front row by Räikkönen, who was fastest for most of the final session. Provisionally sitting in third as the session drew to a close, Massa was pushed back to fifth as Kovalainen and Alonso put in last-minute laps to fill the second row of the grid. Kubica took sixth place, ahead of both Toyota cars of Jarno Trulli and Glock and the Toro Rossos of Sebastian Vettel and Sébastien Bourdais. Coulthard bettered teammate Webber when he qualified 11th; Piquet split the Red Bull drivers in 12th. The only Japanese driver in the field, Nakajima, managed 14th ahead of his Williams teammate Nico Rosberg. Heidfeld could only achieve 16th place, ten places behind his BMW teammate Kubica. Heidfeld spent the majority of the first session struggling with the set-up of his car. The Honda cars of Rubens Barrichello and Jenson Button filled the ninth row in front of the constructor's home crowd. The Force Indias qualified last; Sutil comfortably outqualified his teammate Fisichella by 0.8 seconds, to sit in 19th place.

=== Qualifying classification ===
Pos	No	Driver	Constructor	Q1	Q2	Q3	Grid
1	22	(United Kingdom) Lewis Hamilton	McLaren-Mercedes	1:18.071	1:17.462	1:18.404	1
2	1	(Finland) Kimi Räikkönen	Ferrari	1:18.160	1:17.733	1:18.644	2
3	23	(Finland) Heikki Kovalainen	McLaren-Mercedes	1:18.220	1:17.360	1:18.821	3
4	5	(Spain) Fernando Alonso	Renault	1:18.290	1:17.871	1:18.852	4
5	2	(Brazil) Felipe Massa	Ferrari	1:18.110	1:17.287	1:18.874	5
6	4	(Poland) Robert Kubica	BMW Sauber	1:18.684	1:17.931	1:18.979	6
7	11	(Italy) Jarno Trulli	Toyota	1:18.501	1:17.541	1:19.026	7
8	12	(Germany) Timo Glock	Toyota	1:17.945	1:17.670	1:19.118	8
9	15	(Germany) Sebastian Vettel	Toro Rosso-Ferrari	1:18.559	1:17.714	1:19.638	9
10	14	(France) Sébastien Bourdais	Toro Rosso-Ferrari	1:18.593	1:18.102	1:20.167	10
11	9	(United Kingdom) David Coulthard	Red Bull-Renault	1:18.303	1:18.187		11
12	6	(Brazil) Nelson Piquet Jr.	Renault	1:18.300	1:18.274		12
13	10	(Australia) Mark Webber	Red Bull-Renault	1:18.372	1:18.354		13
14	8	(Japan) Kazuki Nakajima	Williams-Toyota	1:18.640	1:18.594		14
15	7	(Germany) Nico Rosberg	Williams-Toyota	1:18.740	1:18.672		15
16	3	(Germany) Nick Heidfeld	BMW Sauber	1:18.835			16
17	17	(Brazil) Rubens Barrichello	Honda	1:18.882			17
18	16	(United Kingdom) Jenson Button	Honda	1:19.100			18
19	20	(Germany) Adrian Sutil	Force India-Ferrari	1:19.163			19
20	21	(Italy) Giancarlo Fisichella	Force India-Ferrari	1:19.910			20

== Race ==
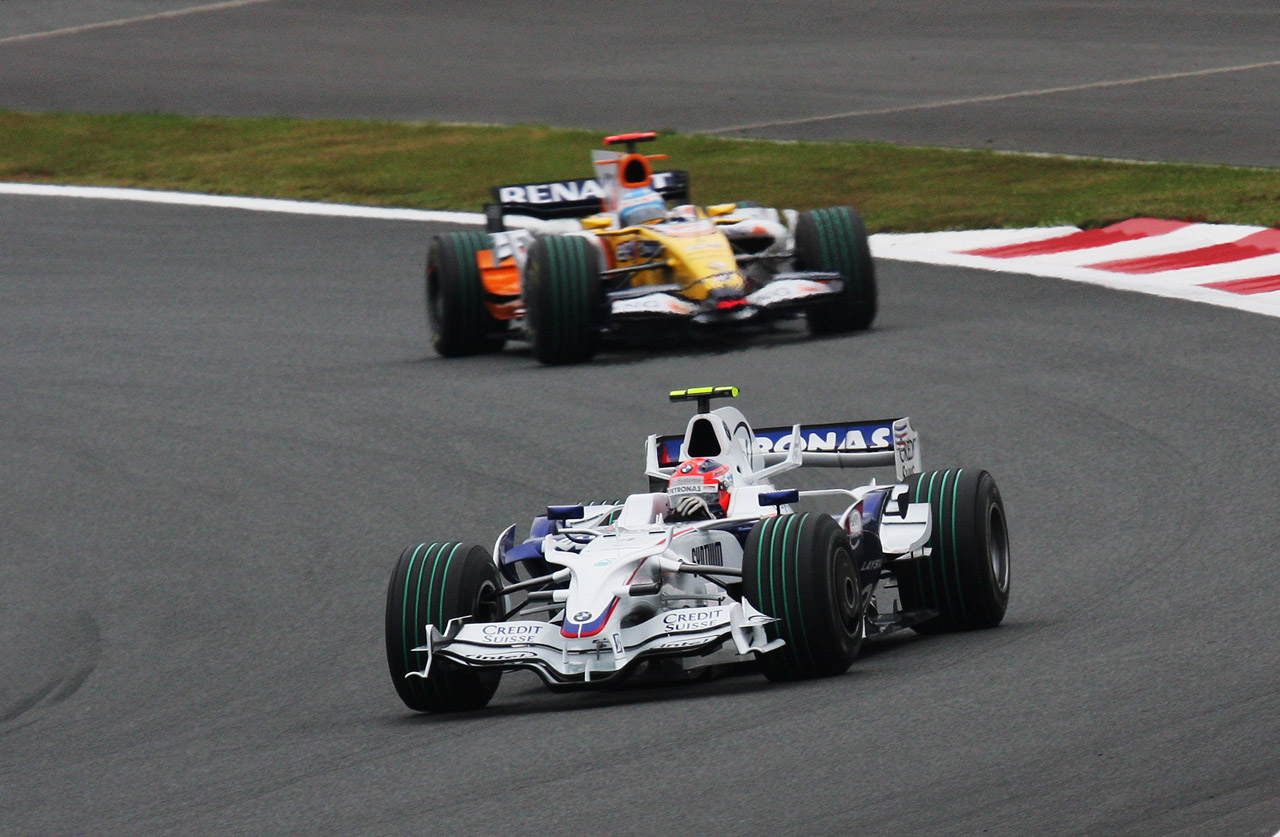
Robert Kubica leads from Fernando Alonso early in the race.

The conditions on the grid were dry before the race. The air temperature was 16 °C (61 °F) and the track temperature was 21 °C (70 °F); conditions were expected to remain consistent throughout the race. Most of the frontrunners began the race on the harder compound tyre; only Massa was using the softer option. The attendance on the day of the Grand Prix was 105,000 people. Räikkönen accelerated faster than Hamilton off the line, getting ahead of him down the first straight, but the McLaren driver pulled into the Ferrari's slipstream, before swerving to overtake Räikkönen in the inside of the corner. Going into the first corner, Hamilton badly locked-up his front wheels while braking and ran wide; although there was no contact, Räikkönen was also forced wide in avoidance. This was then followed by contact with Kovalainen, which finally forced Räikkönen off the track. All three drivers dropped back down the field as a result of the incident. Kubica took the lead ahead of Alonso and Kovalainen after the corner, avoiding collisions as other cars locked their tyres on the cold track. Fisichella drove into the back of Barrichello, scattering carbon fibre over the track. Coulthard collided with Bourdais and then Piquet, sustaining suspension damage and sliding into the barriers after turn two. Nakajima left the track trying to avoid Coulthard, although he managed to rejoin after losing his front wing. The Japanese driver made a pit stop at the end of the lap for a new wing.

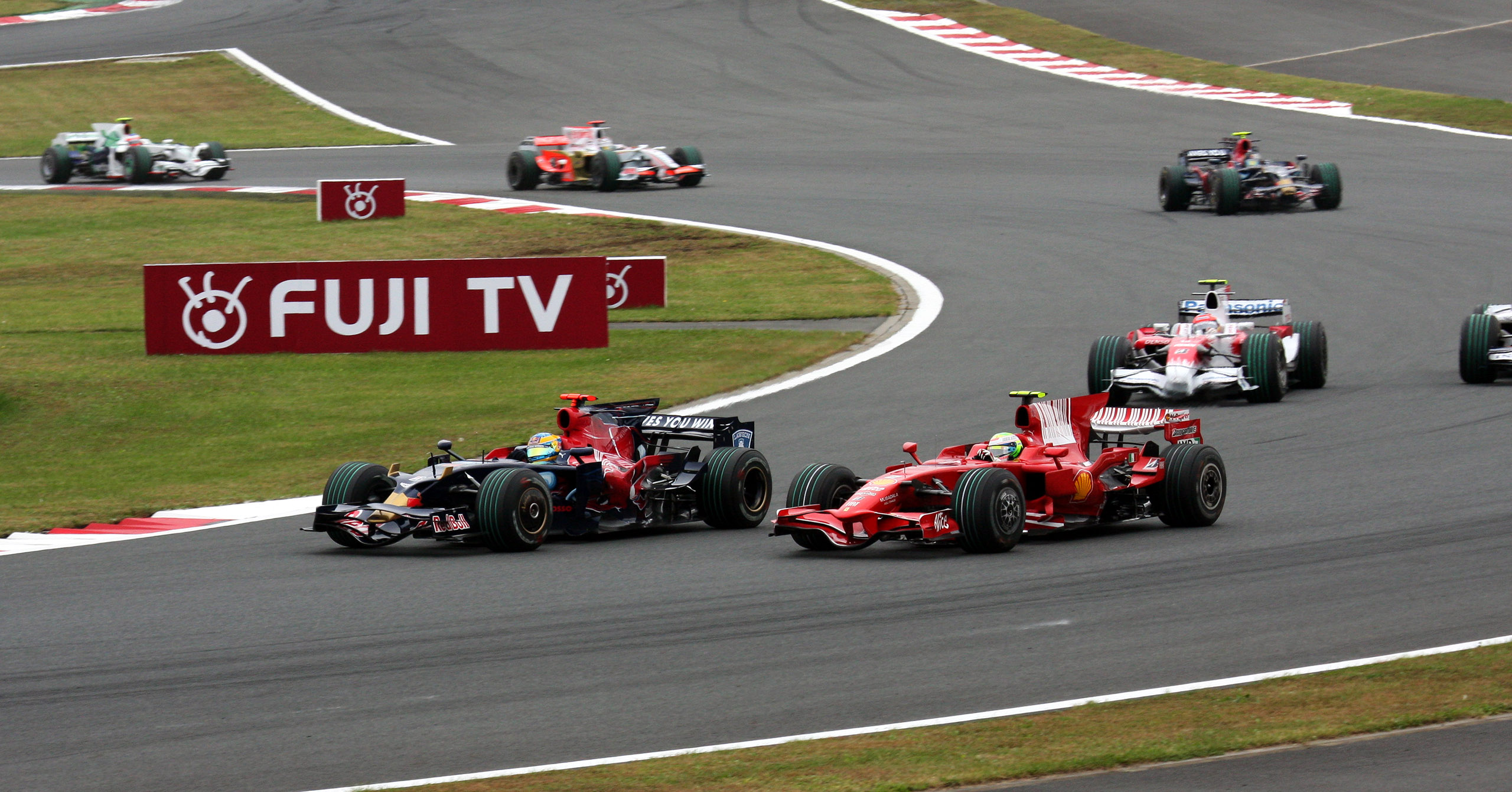
Sébastien Bourdais and Felipe Massa battling for position early in the race

At the end of the first lap, Kubica led from Alonso, Kovalainen, Trulli, Massa, Hamilton and Räikkönen. On lap two, Massa braked late into the chicane at turn 10, briefly letting Hamilton past, before running over the kerbs on the exit from the corner and hitting the McLaren driver's car. Hamilton was spun round by the contact and made a pit stop at the end of the lap for new tyres and more fuel, which dropped him to 18th place. Massa continued in seventh place. On lap eight Räikkönen passed Trulli into turn 10 to take fourth position. In third place, more than a second ahead of the Ferrari driver, Kovalainen set a new fastest lap of 1:19.258 on lap 12 to which Räikkönen responded with a 1:19.193 four laps later. Two more drivers joined Coulthard in retirement before the first round of fuel stops: Glock made a pit stop on lap five and again on lap six, before retiring because of handling difficulties resulting from a broken seat fixing; Sutil retired on lap nine with a puncture caused by running over carbon fibre shards.

On lap 17, Massa and Hamilton were given drive-through penalties, Massa for colliding with Hamilton and Hamilton for forcing Räikkönen off the track into turn one. Hamilton took his penalty immediately. Massa made a pit stop for fuel and tyres on the next lap, before coming into the pit lane again on lap 20 to serve his penalty, which dropped him to 14th place, one place ahead of Hamilton. Meanwhile, Kubica and Räikkönen made pit stops on lap 17 for tyres and fuel. On the same lap, Kovalainen pulled over to the side of the track with engine problems and retired from the race. Alonso made a pit stop on lap 18, emerging ahead of Kubica to take the provisional lead, with cars in front still to pit. Trulli, Vettel and Bourdais made pit stops over the following six laps. Fisichella retired from the race with gearbox problems on lap 21. Piquet took his first pit stop on lap 28, emerging ahead of Bourdais as Alonso opened the gap on Kubica to 7.8 seconds. Massa overtook Button to take 12th position one lap later.

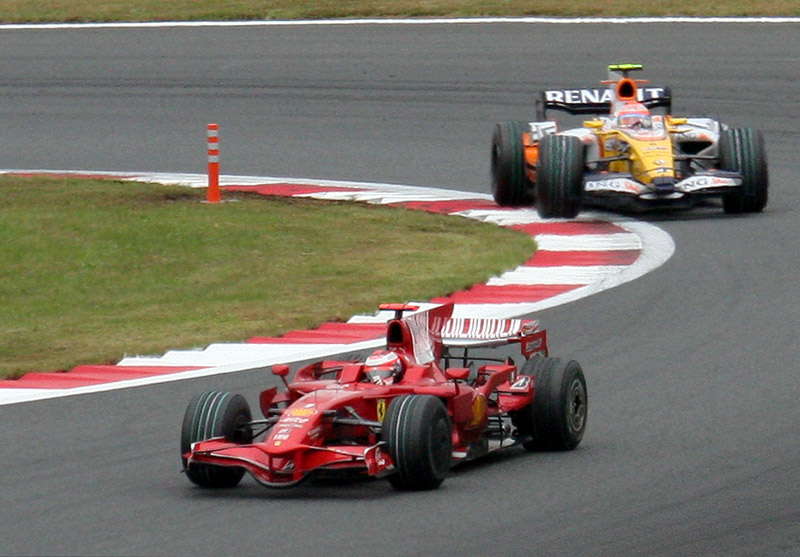
Nelson Piquet closes in on Kimi Räikkönen late in the race.

Alonso lapped consistently in the low 1:19 range, setting the new fastest lap of the race on lap 41, a 1:19.101, to extend his lead over Kubica to more than 12 seconds. Räikkönen was five seconds behind Kubica in third. Alonso made a pit stop for the second time on lap 43 and changed to the softer compound tyre. Kubica, complaining of understeer over the team radio, made his second stop on lap 46, two laps ahead of Räikkönen. Trulli, Bourdais, Vettel and Piquet made pit stops over the next five laps, their teams giving them sufficient fuel to finish the race. As Bourdais exited the pit-lane in seventh place on lap 51, Massa, who was eighth, but yet to make his final pit stop, attempted to pass him and the two cars collided at the first corner. Massa spun, but rejoined the race behind Bourdais. Three laps later, the stewards announced that they were investigating the incident, and would make their decision after the race. On lap 52, Räikkönen attempted to pass Kubica on the approach to turn one after drafting behind him up the straight, but Kubica drove right as a blocking manoeuvre, braked late, and defended his position. On the following lap Kubica attempted to replicate his block, but Räikkönen out-braked him into turn one, and the two drew alongside. Kubica held the inside line on the turn three left-hander, and drove the racing line as Räikkönen left the track at the run-off area. Räikkönen then rejoined behind the BMW driver. Kubica faced similar challenges from Räikkönen over the next two laps into turn one, but he successfully defended his position.

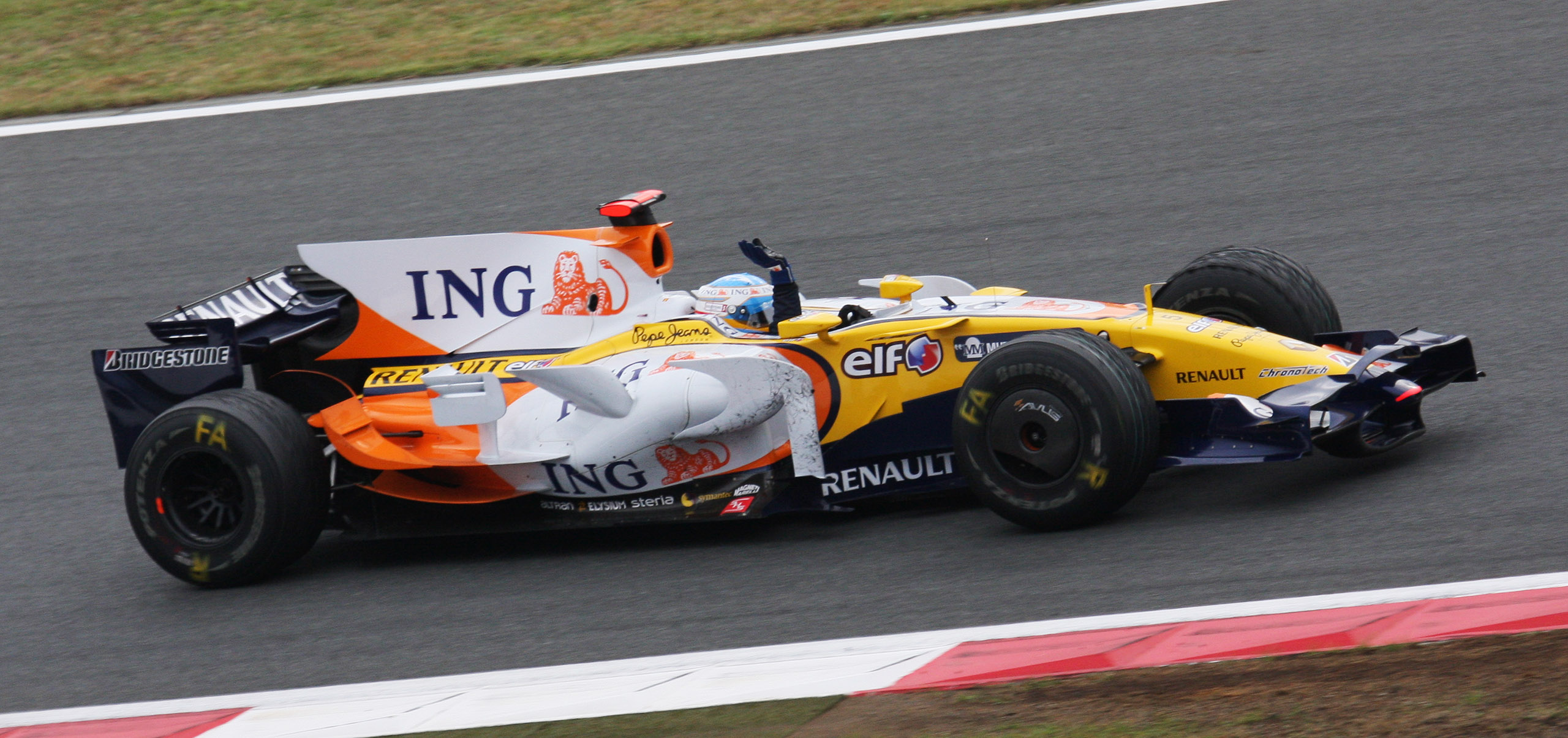
Fernando Alonso celebrates his second consecutive race victory. As of 2021, it is also Renault's last as a chassis constructor, due to them rebranding as Alpine.

Massa made a pit stop on lap 53, and rejoined behind Heidfeld in tenth. He subsequently set the fastest lap of the race on lap 55, a 1:18.426. Meanwhile, Piquet was able to close the gap on Räikkönen to under a second, before losing time by running wide at turn five on lap 60. Massa passed Heidfeld for ninth on the same lap, and began closing in on Webber. On lap 65, Massa drafted down the straight and attempted to pass Webber, who defended his position by driving to the right. Crossing the track boundary into the end of the pit-lane, Massa managed to pass Webber, and out-braked him into turn one, to take eighth place. Alonso crossed the finish line on lap 67 to take his second win of the season, five seconds ahead of Kubica. Räikkönen was third, ahead of Piquet, Trulli, Bourdais, Vettel and Massa. Webber took ninth on the line, ahead of Heidfeld, who struggled with a heavy car and failed to improve on a poor qualifying performance. Rosberg finished in front of Hamilton, in 11th. Barrichello and Button took the next two positions; both drivers blamed their Honda cars for their uncompetitive performance at the Fuji circuit. Nakajima finished last, in 15th, unable to recover after his forced pit-stop early in the race.

=== Post-race ===
Well, again difficult to believe ... I cannot believe it right now but obviously back to back wins is a very nice feeling and the team did a great job to improve the car. We are now maybe just behind Ferrari and McLaren and this is completely amazing.

— Fernando Alonso, speaking after the race.

The top three finishers appeared in the subsequent press conference where Alonso said that the decision to run a shorter second stint than Kubica (between the first and second pit stops) was his decision: "Sometimes you can do it, sometimes you can't but today the car was perfect and I was able to do it." Alonso added that he had confidence in the car to perform at the remaining Grands Prix: "The feeling I have now is that we can do anything". Kubica said that his second-placed finish was better than his win at the Canadian Grand Prix earlier in the season. He added that to finish on the podium after BMW Sauber's failure to improve the car from the beginning of the season was a "great result for the team in, I think, a very difficult moment". Räikkönen said that he was "a bit disappointed because being in first place in the first corner but then being pushed out didn't help and being in the front could have given us a better result but anyhow, that's racing". He added that Kovalainen's impact with him at the first corner had caused handling difficulties in his car, which left him unable to improve on his third-placed finish.

Forty minutes after the race, Bourdais received a 25-second penalty from the stewards for his collision with Massa on lap 50. This demoted him from sixth to tenth, and promoted Massa to seventh, giving him one more Championship point. Bourdais blamed Massa for the incident:

I did everything I could not to run into him and he just squeezed and turned and behaved like I didn't exist, like I wasn't there. What am I supposed to do? ... It's just a little bit of respect, you give each other room and then everything goes right, but if you don't for sure it's going to be an incident.

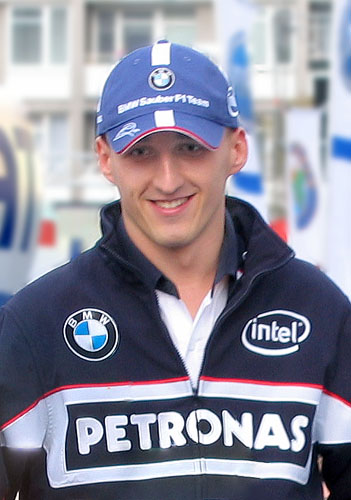
Robert Kubica described his second place as better than his win in Canada earlier in the season.

Massa denied responsibility, and agreed with the stewards' decision: "I think there's little to say: I had already entered the turn and he hit me from behind, spinning me round." The penalty was largely criticized in the media. GrandPrix.com called the penalty "bizarre", saying that Bourdais "could not just disappear". James Allen of ITV said that in light of FIA race director Charlie Whiting's announcement prior to the race, which indicated that cars exiting the pit-lane would have right of way, the penalty was "ridiculous". French sporting newspaper L'Équipe criticized the stewards for their intervention, saying that both drivers held their lines and the collision was just a racing incident. Mark Blundell, who drove in Formula One for five years, called for former drivers to be part of the stewards meetings which award penalties: "You can examine pieces of paper, graphs, telemetry, but you don't know what's going on in a driver's brain until you've experienced it." Blundell's suggestion eventually became fact – the 2010 season introduced a system whereby a former Formula One driver acted as a steward during each Grand Prix.

Lewis Hamilton was criticized for his aggressive drive into the first corner by much of the British press. Edward Gorman of The Times described Hamilton's move as "impetuosity and untamed aggression", adding that Hamilton "gambled with a kamikaze attempt to get past Räikkönen". The BBC's Andrew Benson said that "Hamilton is still in a strong position but the Englishman will have to cut out the mistakes that have characterised his season if he is not to lose the championship for the second year in a row." In Italy, La Gazzetta dello Sport said that Hamilton's start suffered from "his usual excessive aggression". Hamilton said "I made a mistake and I paid for it."

Massa's touch on Hamilton's car on lap two was labelled by the McLaren driver "as deliberate as it could be". Massa rejected the allegation, saying "I had two wheels on the gravel. I could not stop the car and I was on the gravel because he pushed me into the gravel." Media coverage of the incident suggested that though the contact was Massa's fault, it was unintentional. Simon Arron, writing for The Daily Telegraph, said Hamilton's accusation of deliberate contact was "unworthy and unwise", adding that the contact was simply a racing incident. The gap between the drivers in the Drivers' Championship after the race stood at five points, in Hamilton's favour, with two races remaining. In the Constructors' Championship, McLaren's failure to score points, combined with Ferrari's third and seventh, moved Ferrari to a seven-point lead.

=== Race classification ===
Pos	No	Driver	Constructor	Laps	Time/Retired	Grid	Points
1	5	(Spain) Fernando Alonso	Renault	67	1:30:21.892	4	10
2	4	(Poland) Robert Kubica	BMW Sauber	67	+5.283	6	8
3	1	(Finland) Kimi Räikkönen	Ferrari	67	+6.400	2	6
4	6	(Brazil) Nelson Piquet Jr.	Renault	67	+20.570	12	5
5	11	(Italy) Jarno Trulli	Toyota	67	+23.767	7	4
6	15	(Germany) Sebastian Vettel	Toro Rosso-Ferrari	67	+39.207	9	3
7	2	(Brazil) Felipe Massa	Ferrari	67	+46.158	5	2
8	10	(Australia) Mark Webber	Red Bull-Renault	67	+50.811	13	1
9	3	(Germany) Nick Heidfeld	BMW Sauber	67	+54.120	16	
10	14	(France) Sébastien Bourdais	Toro Rosso-Ferrari	67	+59.085^{1}	10	
11	7	(Germany) Nico Rosberg	Williams-Toyota	67	+1:02.096	15	
12	22	(United Kingdom) Lewis Hamilton	McLaren-Mercedes	67	+1:18.900	1	
13	17	(Brazil) Rubens Barrichello	Honda	66	+1 Lap	17	
14	16	(United Kingdom) Jenson Button	Honda	66	+1 Lap	18	
15	8	(Japan) Kazuki Nakajima	Williams-Toyota	66	+1 Lap	14	
Ret	21	(Italy) Giancarlo Fisichella	Force India-Ferrari	21	Gearbox	20	
Ret	23	(Finland) Heikki Kovalainen	McLaren-Mercedes	16	Engine	3	
Ret	20	(Germany) Adrian Sutil	Force India-Ferrari	8	Puncture	19	
Ret	12	(Germany) Timo Glock	Toyota	6	Collision damage	8	
Ret	9	(United Kingdom) David Coulthard	Red Bull-Renault	0	Accident	11	

Notes

- ^1 – Sébastien Bourdais finished sixth, but was given a 25-second penalty for causing a collision with Felipe Massa.

== Championship standings after the race ==
Drivers' Championship standings

+/−	Pos.	Driver	Points
	1	(United Kingdom) Lewis Hamilton*	84
	2	(Brazil) Felipe Massa*	79
	3	(Poland) Robert Kubica*	72
	4	(Finland) Kimi Räikkönen	63
	5	(Germany) Nick Heidfeld	56

Constructors' Championship standings

+/−	Pos.	Driver	Points
1	1	(Italy) Ferrari*	142
1	2	(United Kingdom) McLaren-Mercedes*	135
	3	(Germany) BMW Sauber*	128
	4	(France) Renault	66
	5	(Japan) Toyota	50

- Note: Only the top five positions are included for both sets of standings.
- Bold text and an asterisk indicates competitors who still had a theoretical chance of becoming World Champion.

Previous race: 2008 Singapore Grand Prix	FIA Formula One World Championship; 2008 season	Next race: 2008 Chinese Grand Prix
Previous race: 2007 Japanese Grand Prix	Japanese Grand Prix	Next race: 2009 Japanese Grand Prix
