= Meta-Certificate Working Group =

The Meta-Certificate Working Group (MCWG), also called the Meta-Certificate Group (MCG), was an Internet work group on information security.

The MCWG was founded by Ed Gerck in 1997 and had participants from 26 countries. The discussions were public as in a list server but with a privacy innovation—the participants' names and email addresses were anonymized. This privacy feature, which any participant could break voluntarily by simply disclosing name and email address in the list, allowed the discussion to proceed on a technical level more easily, with less ad hominem attacks. This also allowed unwitting competitors to collaborate, creating an open climate.

The work developed by the MCWG has been applied to Internet standards and practical developments in several work groups and companies worldwide.
