= Muslim Consumer Group =

U.S. non-profit organization

The Muslim Consumer Group (MCG) is a U.S. non-profit organization founded in November 1993 by Syed Rasheeduddin Ahmed, based in Rolling Meadows, Illinois. Its goal was to educate Muslims about Halal foods and perform Halal certification, which was not done by any other organization in the United States at that time.

== Overview ==
MCG first established its website in 2000 to educate Muslims throughout the world about the Halal status of food ingredients, E-numbers and food products. MCG has written a book, titled A Comprehensive List of Halal Food Products in U.S. and Canadian Supermarkets that lists food products and ingredients that are certified as Halal. MCG also visits mosques and religious centers in the United States to give educational presentations about food products, medicine, cosmetics, and personal care products.

A major breakthrough in R&D was the discovery of the source of L-Cysteine, which was being derived from human hair. Muslim dietary laws do not allow the ingestion of anything that is derived from the human body. It was found that there were several companies that were using this in their baked goods that varied from Naan, which was being supplied to Muslim stores in major U.S. cities, to donuts made by Dunkin' Donuts. A well known Halal food company, AlSafa, uses L-Cysteine in its chicken nuggets, chicken patties, and chicken strips. After MCG's publication of these findings, the source for the L-Cysteine was changed in a large part to chicken or duck feathers. It has not been confirmed that AlSafa uses chicken or duck feathers.

== H-MCG symbol ==
MCG Symbol

MCG Symbol2

The H-MCG symbols are used by the Muslim Consumer Group to identify the Halal status of different edible and non-edible consumer products.
