= Make Cars Green =

Environmental initiative by the FIA

Make Cars Green (MCG) is a campaign by the Fédération Internationale de l'Automobile (FIA) aimed at reducing the impact of cars on the environment. The campaign consists of advising motorists of methods of reducing carbon dioxide emissions, as well as purchasing environmentally friendlier vehicles.

== Campaign ==
The Make Cars Green campaign was launched at the 2008 World Environment Day, which was held in New Zealand. The event was attended by the FIA Foundation director General David Ward and the World Bank's road safety specialist Tony Bliss, as well as New Zealand prime minister Helen Clark. Ward outlined the importance of the campaign, noting:

The forecasts which are pretty astonishing are that over the next 20 to 30 years the vehicle fleet will double in size as China and India and other countries motorise like we did in the 1950s, 60s and 70s. At a global level we are facing a huge increase in the number of vehicles in use and that's one of the drivers behind the oil price. What we need is much more fuel efficient vehicles to accommodate the huge growing global demand for motorised travel.

The basis of the campaign is a ten-point guide for reducing the environmental impact of cars, including checking tyre pressure for optimum efficiency, planning journeys in advance and offsetting carbon emissions. The FIA aims to reach these objectives by working with its member clubs.

== In Formula One ==
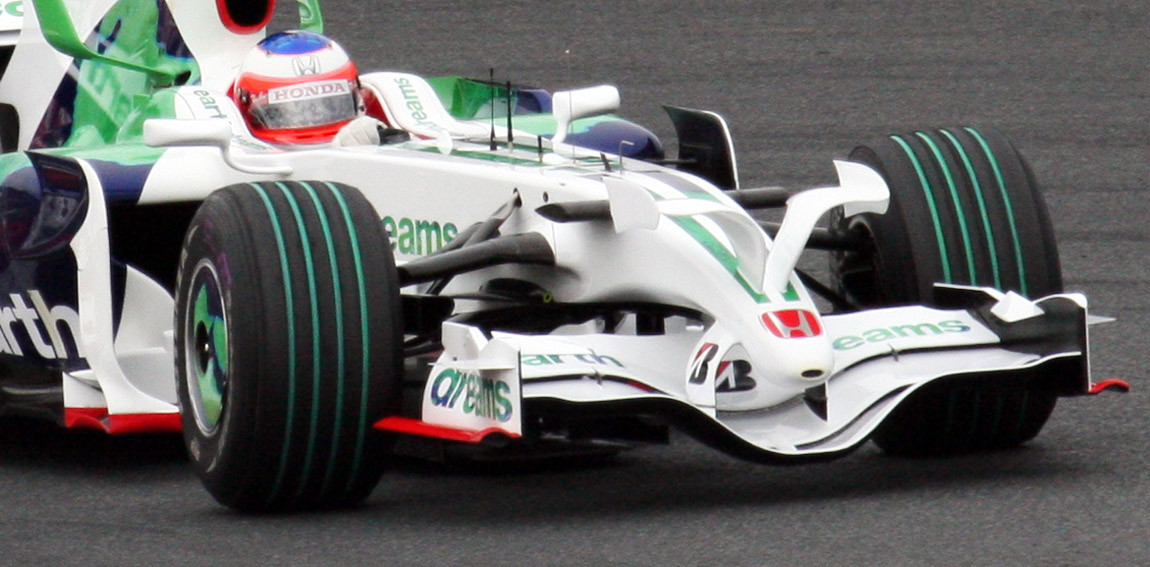
Bridgestone used tyres with green grooves for the 2008 Japanese Grand Prix, as part of the "green" push.

As the FIA is the governing body of Formula One, the sport is involved in the campaign. At the 2008 Japanese Grand Prix, tyre supplier Bridgestone provided the teams with green-grooved tyres in order to draw attention to Make Cars Green.

FIA president Max Mosley outlined the sport's commitment to the campaign:

New rule changes, alongside the support for awareness-raising initiatives such as the Make Cars Green campaign, will change the face of motor sport and place it at the very heart of environmental developments in the automotive sector. The FIA is determined to ensure that future investment in motor sport will also help drive the development of technologies that will benefit the public at large.

The president of the Japan Automobile Federation, Tetsuo Tanaka, agreed with Mosley, adding:

By aiding the development of eco-technology, Formula One can make a significant contribution towards the effort to reduce the CO_{2} from road traffic. And by using its global appeal to promote Make Cars Green, the sport can encourage fans and followers alike to think green when they drive.

The FIA and Bridgestone held a press conference before the grand prix where F1 drivers Felipe Massa, Kimi Räikkönen, Lewis Hamilton and Heikki Kovalainen outlined the ways in which they reduce their carbon footprints.

== See also ==
- Fédération Internationale de l'Automobile
- World Environment Day
- 2008 Japanese Grand Prix
