= BMW Sauber F1.08 =

Formula One Car for 2008 season

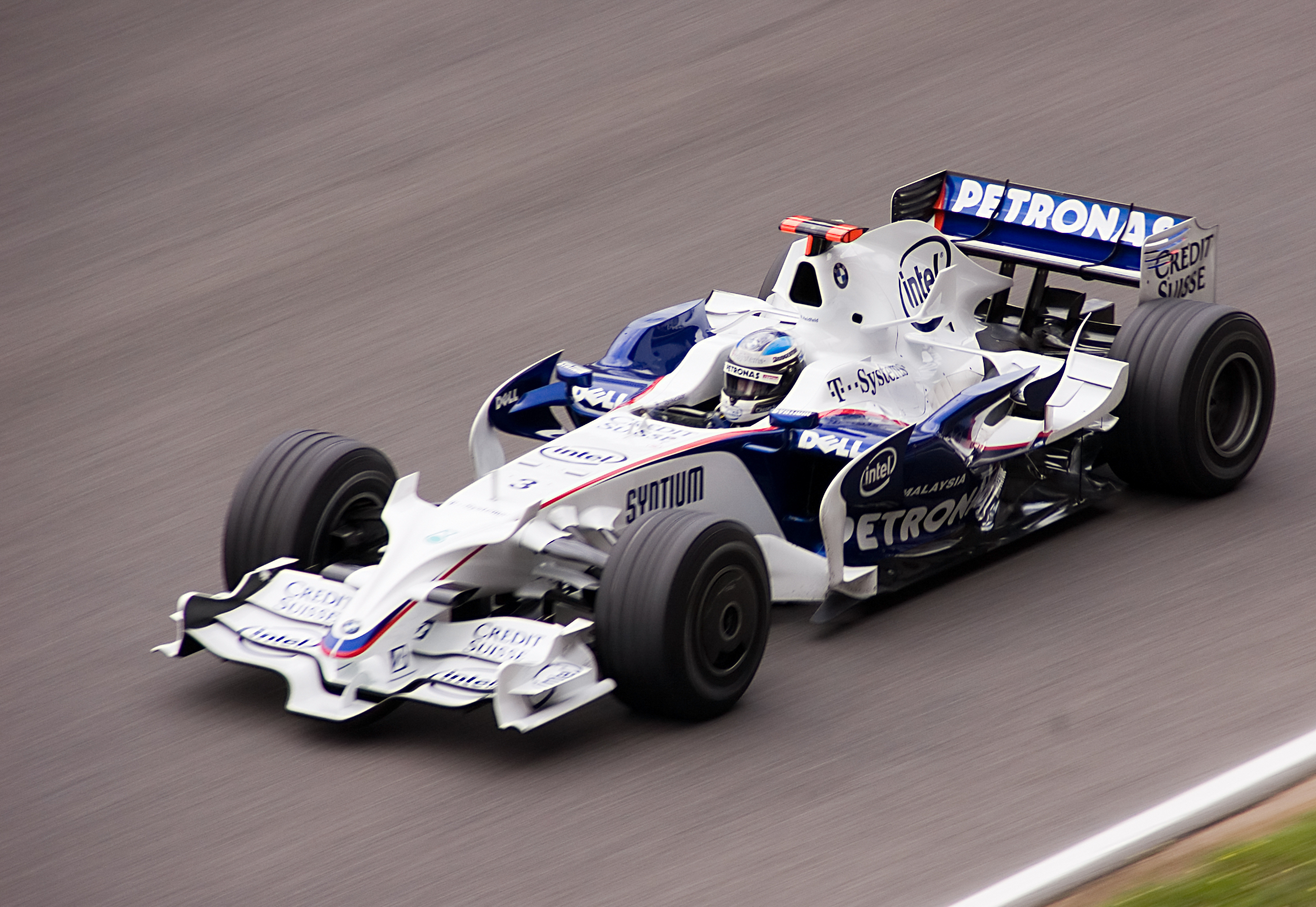
- Nick Heidfeld testing the F1.08 at Circuit de Barcelona-Catalunya
- Category: Formula One
- Constructor: BMW Sauber
- Designers: Willy Rampf (Technical Director); Walter Riedl (Engineering Director); Christoph Zimmermann (Chief Designer); Thomas Knodel (Deputy Chief Designer); Loïc Serra (Chief Vehicle Dynamicist); Willem Toet (Head of Aerodynamics); Seamus Mullarkey (Chief Aerodynamicist); Markus Duesmann (Engine Director); Angelo Camerini (Chief Designer, Engine)
- Predecessor: BMW Sauber F1.07
- Successor: BMW Sauber F1.09

Technical specifications
- Chassis: Carbon-fibre monocoque
- Suspension (front): Upper and lower wishbones, push-rod activated inboard spring/damper (Sachs Race Engineering). Zero keel geometry
- Suspension (rear): As front
- Length: 4,600 mm (181 in)
- Width: 1,800 mm (71 in)
- Height: 1,000 mm (39 in)
- Axle track: F: 1,470 mm (58 in); R: 1,410 mm (56 in)
- Wheelbase: 3,130 mm (123 in)
- Engine: BMW P86/8 2,400 cc (146 cu in) V8 (90°). Naturally aspirated, 19,000 RPM Limited mid-engine, longitudinally mounted
- Transmission: BMW Sauber 7-speed "Quick Shift Gearbox (QSG)". Longitudinally mounted, carbon-fibre clutch (AP)
- Weight: 605 kg (1,334 lb) (including driver)
- Fuel: Petronas
- Tyres: Bridgestone Potenza; OZ Wheels Front & Rear

Competition history
- Notable entrants: BMW Sauber F1 Team
- Notable drivers: 3. (Germany) Nick Heidfeld; 4. (Poland) Robert Kubica
- Debut: 2008 Australian Grand Prix
- First win: 2008 Canadian Grand Prix
- Last win: 2008 Canadian Grand Prix
- Last event: 2008 Brazilian Grand Prix
Races	Wins	Podiums	Poles	F/Laps
18	1	11	1	2

The BMW Sauber F1.08 (also known as Sauber C27) was the Formula One racing car with which the BMW Sauber team competed in the 2008 Formula One World Championship. The chassis was designed by Willy Rampf, Walter Reidl, Christoph Zimmermann and Willem Toet with the powertrain being designed by Markus Duesmann.

As of 2025, the F1.08's win at the Canadian Grand Prix is the only time that a car produced by Sauber Motorsport and the last time that a BMW-powered car has won a Formula One Grand Prix.

== Launch ==
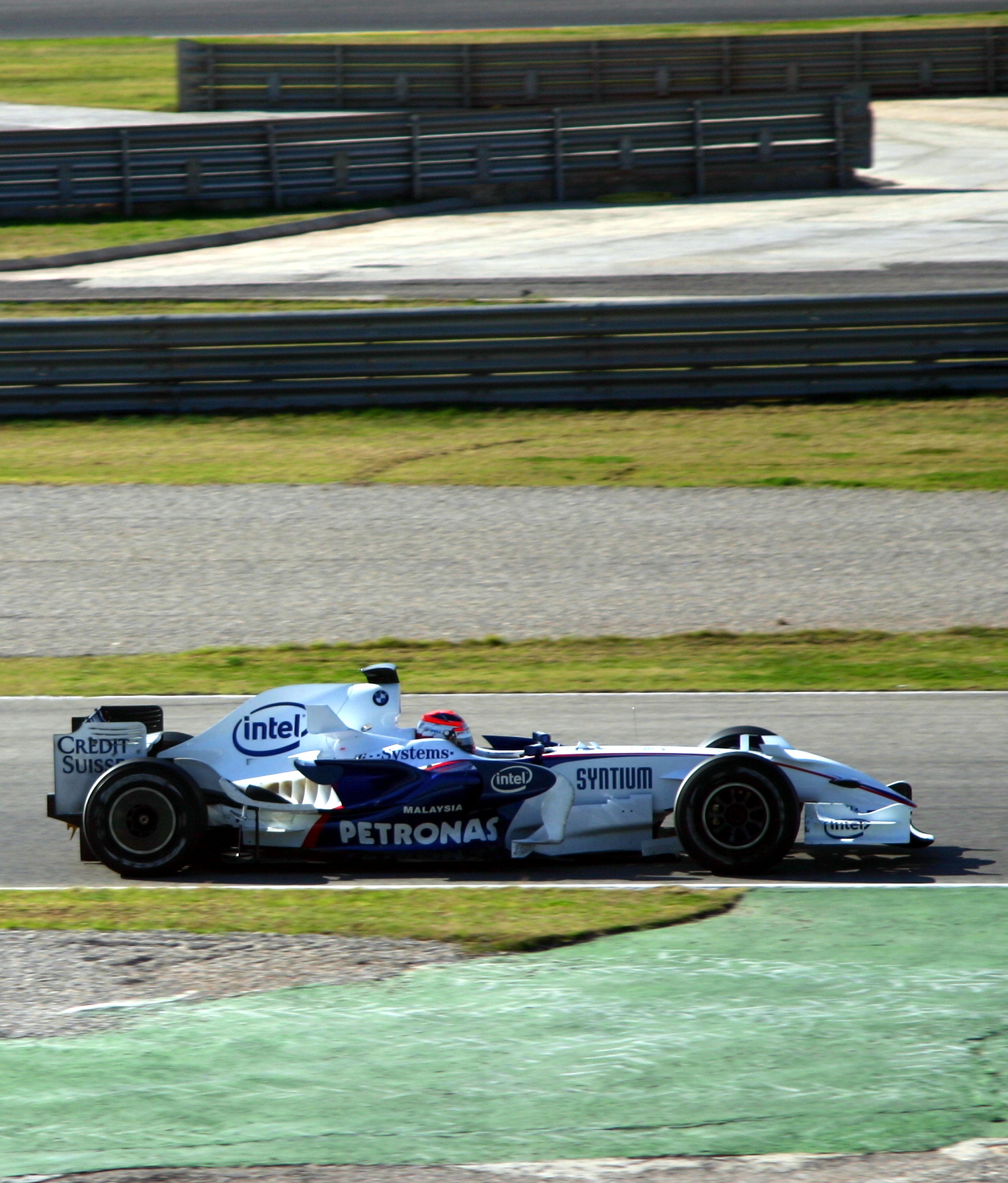
Robert Kubica driving the F1.08 at the Early 2008 Testing at Valencia, 01-23-2008.

The F1.08 was launched on January 14, 2008 in Munich. The car was taken out for the first time at the Valencia circuit a day after the launch, where Nick Heidfeld took the car for a brief spin at BMW Welt, the BMW delivery center in Munich. The first track outing of the F1.08 was given to Robert Kubica.

=== Designer change ===
This was the first BMW Sauber to not be designed by Jörg Zander who left the team to go to Honda F1 in January 2008.

=== Livery and sponsorship ===
For the 2008 season, BMW Sauber kept the white and navy livery used on its cars in 2006 and 2007. However, O2 was replaced by T-Systems, and Cadence Design Systems also became an official equipment supplier. The team continued to be sponsored and supported by Petronas, Intel, Certina, Dell and Credit Suisse.

== Technical developments of the F1.08 ==
=== Rules changes ===
The FIA implemented a set of rules for the 2008 season that saw all teams use one gearbox for four races and a standard McLaren Electronic Systems ECU that prevents the use of driving aids such as traction control and engine braking.

=== Aerodynamic and mechanical changes ===
The sidepod areas underwent massive changes for 2008, along with a cleaning up of the area in front of the rear wing. This made the airflow cleaner and smoother over the car to the rear wing, increasing downforce. The F1.08 also introduced a new front wing that is suspended above the nose. It is similar to the wing introduced on the McLaren MP4-22 in 2007, but it instead has a triple profile. The team also tested 'antlers'; vertical fins on the nosecone of the F1.08 in testing.

== 2008 season ==
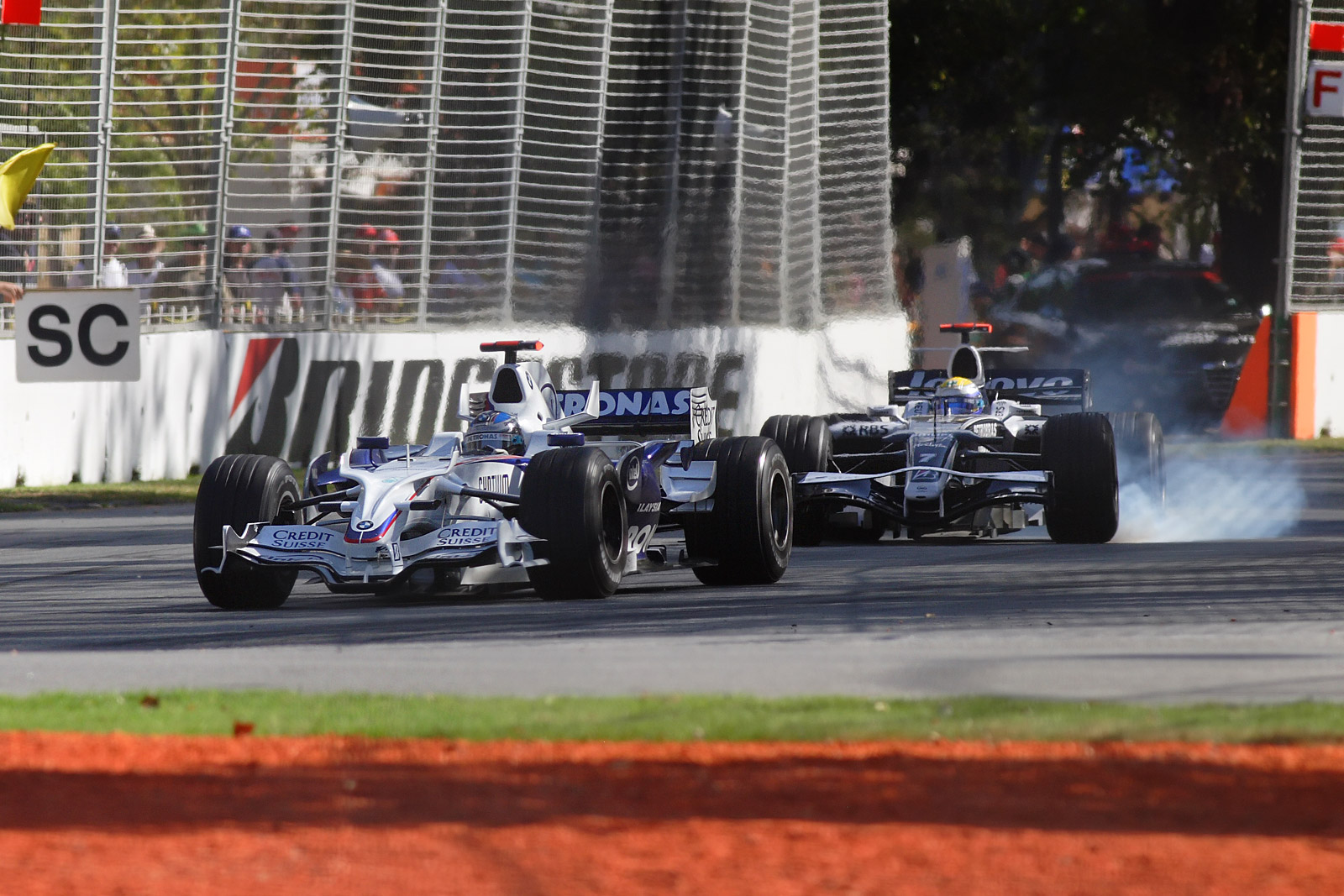
Nick Heidfeld gave the F1.08 a podium finish on its début race meeting by finishing second at the 2008 Australian Grand Prix.

=== Early 2008 testing ===
The first run of the F1.08 was at an exclusive three-day test at the Valencia circuit in Spain. Heidfeld had the duty of testing the F1.08 whilst teammate Kubica drove the F1.07B for the duration of the three-day test with the exception of the first day where Heidfeld drove the F1.07B. However, when the team returned to the same circuit to test the F1.08 on 23 January, it was shown to be slow in comparison to its competitors and the team's previous pace. Technical director Willy Rampf played down rumors of a lack of speed and confirmed that the car would be running in a revised form at the Barcelona test on 1 to 3 February 2008.

=== Successful start to season ===
The BMW Sauber team enjoyed a successful start to the 2008 season with Nick Heidfeld finishing second in Melbourne, 5.4 seconds behind the McLaren of Lewis Hamilton. At the next race in Malaysia Robert Kubica finished second, 19.5 seconds behind Kimi Räikkönen and his Ferrari; Nick Heidfeld also took the fastest lap. At the Bahrain Grand Prix Kubica took pole, just 0.027 seconds ahead of Ferrari driver Felipe Massa. In the race, however, Kubica started badly and lost ground to Massa in the first corner and to Raikkonen early in the race as well. Kubica and Heidfeld finished behind both Ferraris, in 3rd and 4th places, respectively.

After the Bahrain race BMW Sauber were leading the Constructors' Championship, a point ahead of Ferrari and two ahead of McLaren-Mercedes.

=== Early middle season ===
After the successful start of the 2008 season, the BMW Sauber team enjoyed being a strong performer at the front of the grid. At Barcelona, Kubica finished 4th, whilst Heidfeld finished out of the points in 9th. In Turkey, both BMW Sauber cars finished 4th and 5th, with Kubica finishing in 4th. However, Kubica was to make a great impact at the rain impacted and incident laden Monaco Grand Prix, he equalled Heidfeld's Australian Grand Prix finish of 2nd, just 3 seconds behind Lewis Hamilton, Heidfeld finished 14th 4 laps down with chassis problems.

=== First win and 1–2 finish in Canada ===
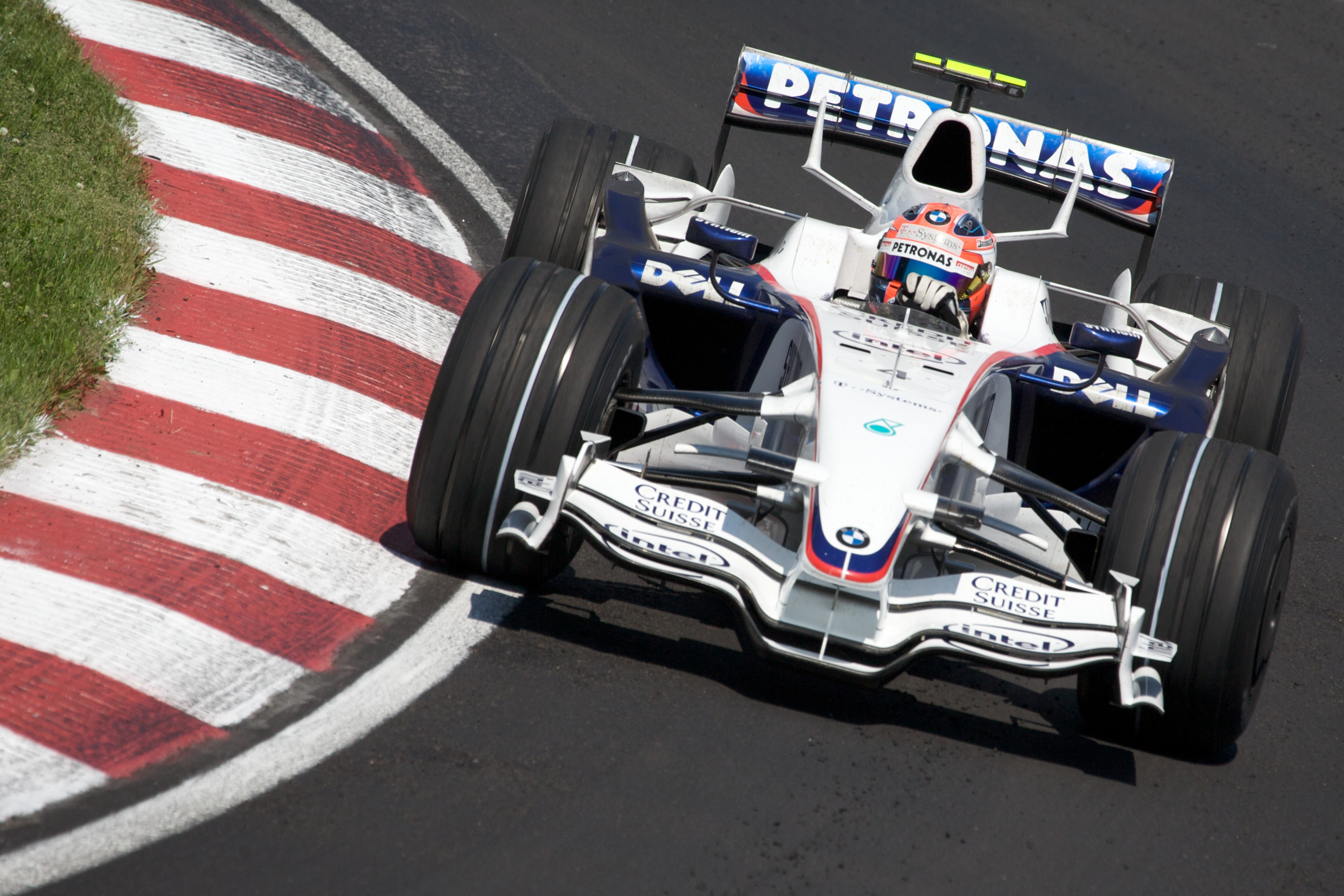
The F1.08 became the first BMW Sauber chassis to win a race, courtesy of Robert Kubica at the 2008 Canadian Grand Prix.

The best result of the season came at the Canadian Grand Prix, with Kubica qualifying on the front row of the grid, in second behind Lewis Hamilton, with Heidfeld qualifying in 8th. In the race Kubica was in second, 7 seconds behind Hamilton, when Sutil crashed, bringing out the safety car. The top running cars pitted in under safety car, Kubica and Räikkönen stopped at the end of the pit lane, both leading Hamilton out of the pits, only for a red light to be on, Räikkönen and Kubica stopped, but only for Hamilton to crash into the rear of Räikkönen, with Rosberg crashing into the rear of Hamilton. Räikkönen, and Hamilton retired, with Rosberg only needing a new nose, Kubica emerged unscathed.

Heidfeld led after the only safety car period, when he pitted he had around a 25-second lead over Kubica, who was down in around 10th at the time. Heidfeld was released in front of his teammate, but was slow due to fueling levels and was passed by Kubica a lap later.

Kubica then built up a large lead, pitted and came out ahead of Heidfeld, and this was the way it would stay for the rest of the race, with Kubica finishing in first, 16 seconds ahead of his BMW Sauber teammate who was around 8 seconds ahead of Red Bull driver David Coulthard.

=== Remainder of season ===
The F1.08 lost its performance somewhat relative to Ferrari and McLaren over the remainder of 2008 as they started to focus on the 2009 season. This irritated Robert Kubica who was leading the championship at that time, but both drivers scored podium finishes and kept the team in third place in the Constructors' Championship, scoring more points than in the previous year.

== Off-season testing ==
A "B"-spec version of the F1.08 was used to evaluate 2009 aerodynamics, slick tyres and a prototype Kinetic Energy Recovery System. BMW Sauber were the first team to have tested all of these new features at the same time during a public F1 testing session. The radically different appearance of the hybrid chassis compared to the status quo attracted attention, with BMW Sauber test driver Christian Klien describing it as "the worst [looking] Formula One car I have ever seen".

== Complete Formula One results ==
(key) (results in bold indicate pole position) (results in italics indicate fastest lap)

Year	Team	Engine	Tyres	Drivers	1	2	3	4	5	6	7	8	9	10	11	12	13	14	15	16	17	18	Points	WCC
2008	BMW Sauber F1 Team	BMW V8	**B**		AUS	MAL	BHR	ESP	TUR	MON	CAN	FRA	GBR	GER	HUN	EUR	BEL	ITA	SIN	JPN	CHN	BRA	**135**	**3rd**
2008	BMW Sauber F1 Team	BMW V8	**B**	(Germany) Nick Heidfeld	2	6	4	9	5	14	2	13	2	4	10	9	2	5	6	9	5	10	**135**	**3rd**
2008	BMW Sauber F1 Team	BMW V8	**B**	(Poland) Robert Kubica	Ret	2	**3**	4	4	2	1	5	Ret	7	8	3	6	3	11	2	6	11	**135**	**3rd**

== F1.08 cutaway ==
During 2012 Sauber released a video and images of an F1.08 that had been sliced in half. Former car chief, Sergio Bonagura, came up with the idea in late 2009. The project began shortly after and was worked on behind the scenes taking around two years to complete.
