= BMW Sauber F1.09 =

2009 Formula One racecar

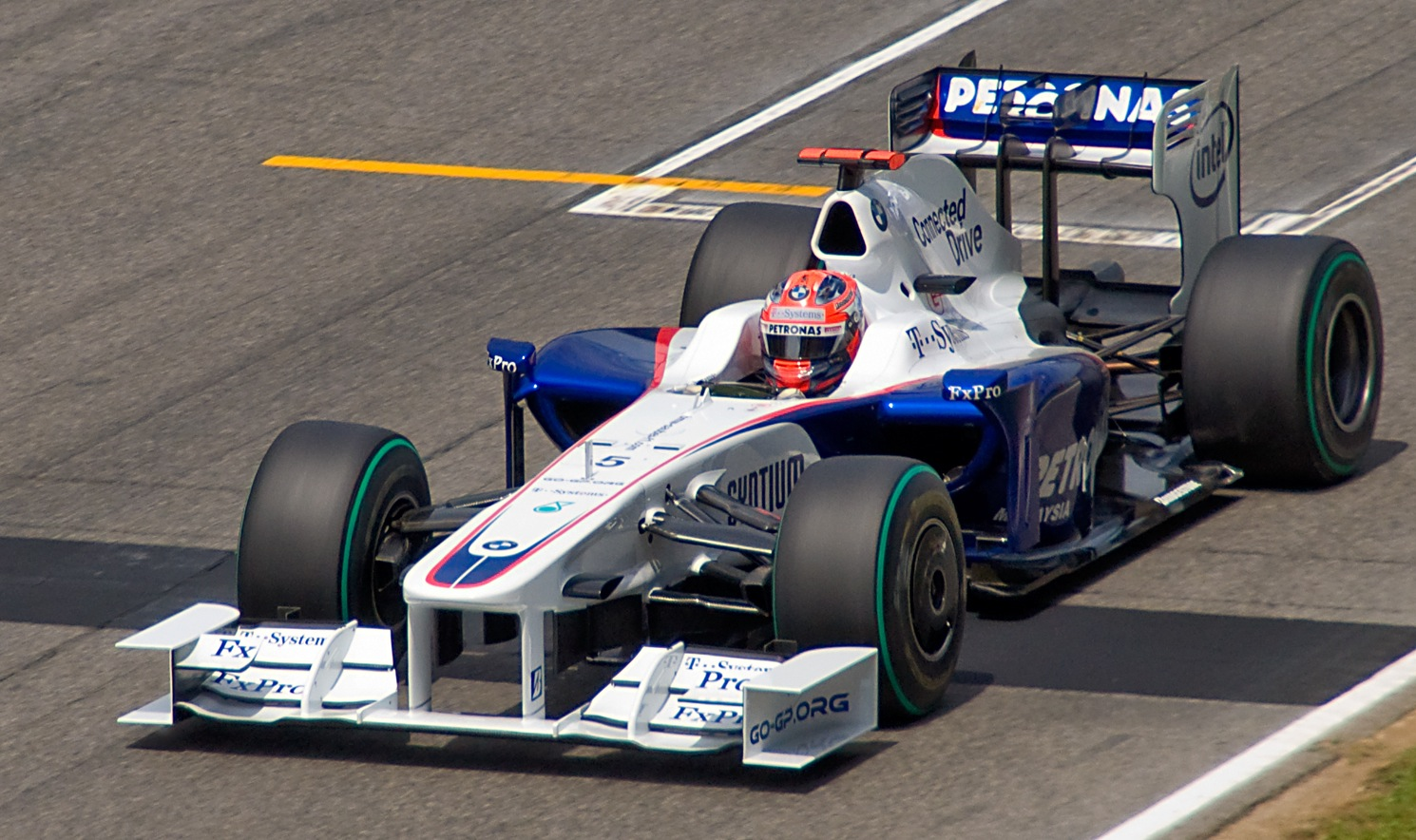
- Robert Kubica driving the F1.09 at the Spanish Grand Prix
- Category: Formula One
- Constructor: BMW Sauber
- Designers: Willy Rampf (Technical Director); Walter Riedl (Engineering Director); Christoph Zimmermann (Chief Designer); Thomas Knodel (Deputy Chief Designer); Loïc Serra (Chief Vehicle Dynamicist); Willem Toet (Head of Aerodynamics); Mariano Alperin (Head of Aerodynamic Development); Seamus Mullarkey (Chief Aerodynamicist); Christian Ebner (KERS Project Leader); Markus Duesmann (Engine Director)
- Predecessor: BMW Sauber F1.08
- Successor: Sauber C29

Technical specifications
- Chassis: Carbon fibre monocoque
- Suspension (front): Upper and lower wishbones, inboard springs and dampers, actuated by pushrods
- Suspension (rear): As front
- Engine: BMW P86/9 2.4 litres V8 Naturally aspirated, 18,000 RPM Limited with KERS
- Transmission: 7 forward speeds + 1 reverse
- Fuel: Petronas
- Tyres: Bridgestone Potenza; OZ Wheels

Competition history
- Notable entrants: BMW Sauber F1 Team
- Notable drivers: 5. (Poland) Robert Kubica; 6. (Germany) Nick Heidfeld
- Debut: 2009 Australian Grand Prix
- Last event: 2009 Abu Dhabi Grand Prix
Races	Wins	Podiums	Poles	F/Laps
17	0	2	0	0

The BMW Sauber F1.09 was the Formula One car with which the BMW Sauber team competed in the 2009 Formula One World Championship. The car was launched on 20 January 2009 at Circuit de Valencia in Spain. It was driven by Poland's Robert Kubica and Germany's Nick Heidfeld, both retained from 2008. The chassis was designed by Willy Rampf, Walter Reidl, Christoph Zimmermann and Willem Toet with the powertrain being designed by Markus Duesmann.

As of 2025, this was the last Formula One car powered by a BMW engine and the last Sauber car utilizing with Petronas fuels, as they would supply to Mercedes the following season. The F1.09 was also the last Hinwil-based Formula One car to utilize other than Ferrari engines until the Audi R26 in the 2026 season.

== Season summary ==
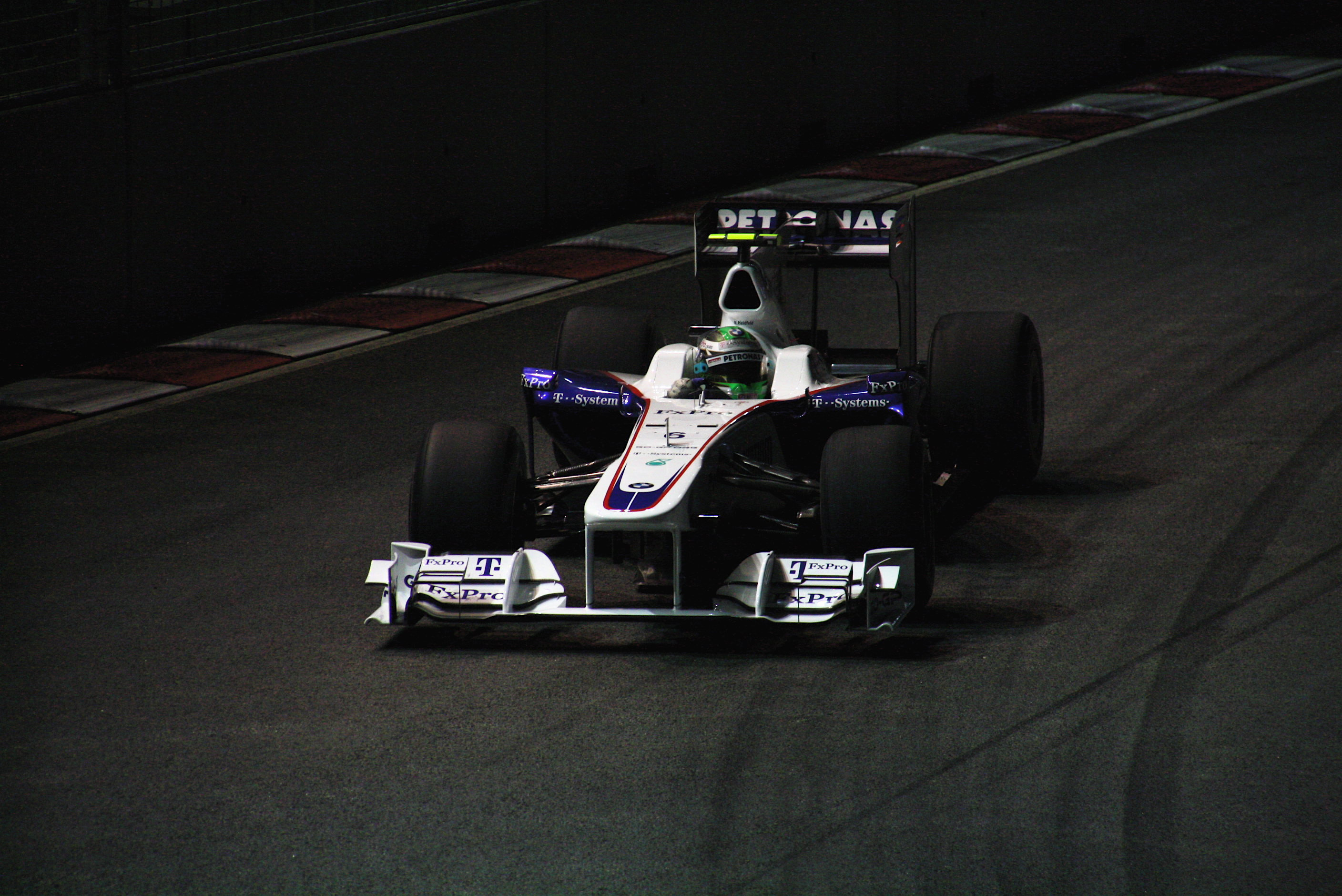
Nick Heidfeld driving the F1.09 at the Singapore Grand Prix

After the team's impressive performance in 2008, winning their first race and coming third in the championship, much was expected of them. BMW made a promising start to the season, with Kubica running second at Melbourne and lapping faster than the leader before retiring in a collision, and Heidfeld finishing second at the chaotic Malaysian GP. However, the F1.09 ultimately proved to be disappointing. At times, the drivers could barely scrape through to Q2, let alone challenge for pole. Both drivers expressed discontent with the slow developments to the car. Towards the end of the season things began to look up, with the cars managing fourth and fifth at Spa-Francorchamps and Kubica finishing second at Brazil. However, the damage had been done, and BMW announced that 2009 would be their last season in Formula One. The team eventually finished sixth in the Constructors' Championship.

== Livery ==
The livery was similar to the previous year's car. The engine cover promoted both BMW's ConnectedDrive and EfficientDynamics technology at different races.

In Monaco, the engine cover had a message which read "Happy Birthday, MINI", celebrating 50 years of the Mini division.

== Complete Formula One results ==
(key) (results in bold indicate pole position; results in italics indicate fastest lap)

Year	Entrant	Engine	Tyres	Drivers	1	2	3	4	5	6	7	8	9	10	11	12	13	14	15	16	17	Points	WCC
2009	BMW Sauber F1 Team	BMW P86/9 V8	**B**		AUS	MAL^{‡}	CHN	BHR	ESP	MON	TUR	GBR	GER	HUN	EUR	BEL	ITA	SIN	JPN	BRA	ABU	36	6th
2009	BMW Sauber F1 Team	BMW P86/9 V8	**B**	(Poland) Robert Kubica	14^{†}	Ret	13	18	11	Ret	7	13	14	13	8	4	Ret	8	9	2	10	36	6th
2009	BMW Sauber F1 Team	BMW P86/9 V8	**B**	(Germany) Nick Heidfeld	10	2	12	19	7	11	11	15	10	11	11	5	7	Ret	6	Ret	5	36	6th

^{†} Driver failed to finish, but was classified as they had completed >90% of the race distance.
^{‡} Half points awarded as less than 75% of race distance completed.
