= 2008 French Grand Prix =

Coordinates: 46°51′51″N 3°09′49″E

Race 8 of 18 in the 2008 Formula One World Championship
← Previous race	Next race →

Race details
- Date: 22 June 2008
- Official name: Formula 1 Grand Prix de France 2008
- Location: Circuit de Nevers Magny-Cours, Magny-Cours, France
- Course: Permanent racing facility
- Course length: 4.411 km (2.741 miles)
- Distance: 70 laps, 308.586 km (191.746 miles)
- Weather: Dry at first; light rain in the final stages

Pole position
Driver	(Finland) Kimi Räikkönen	Ferrari
- Time: 1:16.449

Fastest lap
Driver	(Finland) Kimi Räikkönen	Ferrari
- Time: 1:16.630 on lap 16

Podium
First	(Brazil) Felipe Massa	Ferrari
Second	(Finland) Kimi Räikkönen	Ferrari
Third	(Italy) Jarno Trulli	Toyota

The 2008 French Grand Prix (formally the Formula 1 Grand Prix de France 2008) was a Formula One motor race held on 22 June 2008 at the Circuit de Nevers Magny-Cours, France. This race would be the last French Grand Prix for a decade, before returning in 2018 at Circuit Paul Ricard. The 70-lap race event, the eighth of the 2008 Formula One World Championship, was won by Felipe Massa for the Ferrari team starting from second position. Kimi Räikkönen, who started from pole position, finished second in the other Ferrari car; Jarno Trulli was third in a Toyota.

Räikkönen and Massa both made a clean start. Renault's Fernando Alonso, who started third, was overtaken by Trulli and BMW Sauber driver Robert Kubica. The front three of Räikkönen, Massa and Trulli maintained their positions through the first round of pit stops. On lap 30, Räikkönen led Massa by six and a half seconds, and Trulli by 30 seconds. Just before half distance, Räikkönen's right exhaust pipe broke, which caused the engine to lose power. Massa, in second place, began lapping quicker than Räikkönen, and he caught and passed him on lap 39. Massa maintained his lead through the second round of pit stops, and won the race; Räikkönen finished almost 18 seconds behind. Trulli fended off McLaren's Heikki Kovalainen, who challenged him in the latter stages, to take third.

Massa's win promoted him into the lead of the World Drivers' Championship for the first time in his career, overtaking Kubica. Kubica was second, two points behind Massa, while Räikkönen was third. In the World Constructors' Championship, Ferrari increased their lead to 17 points ahead of BMW Sauber, McLaren a further 16 points behind in third.

== Background ==
The Grand Prix was contested by 20 drivers, in ten teams of two. The teams, also known as "constructors", were Ferrari, McLaren-Mercedes, Renault, Honda, Force India-Ferrari, BMW Sauber, Toyota, Red Bull-Renault, Williams-Toyota and Toro Rosso-Ferrari. Tyre supplier Bridgestone brought two different tyre compounds to the race; the softer of the two marked by a single white stripe down one of the grooves.

Before the race, Robert Kubica of BMW led the Drivers' Championship, with 42 points, ahead of McLaren's Lewis Hamilton and Ferrari's Felipe Massa, who each had 38 points. Massa's teammate Kimi Räikkönen was fourth, ahead of Kubica's teammate Nick Heidfeld in fifth. In the Constructors' Championship, Ferrari were leading with 73 points; three points ahead of BMW Sauber with 70 points; McLaren were a further 17 points behind them in third.

Ferrari came into the race with a long series of success at the track, having won seven of the last ten races held at Magny-Cours. In 2007, Ferrari had taken a one-two, Räikkönen ahead of Massa. Massa said that it was important not to discount McLaren and BMW:

In recent years, people would say that Canada and Monaco suited McLaren better than Ferrari, while it was the other way round in France and Britain, but I don't think that is really the case this year, as apart from any other factors, we have to consider the BMW team in this equation. This year in Monaco, Ferrari had the whole front row of the grid, even though I think we had more fuel than McLaren and in Canada our race pace was very good too. In other races we have all been very close.

In March 2007, the Fédération Française du Sport Automobile (FFSA) stated their intention to rest the Magny-Cours circuit from the Formula One world championship for the 2008 season. Despite this, the race was held in 2008, but the race was dropped from the Formula One calendar for 2009. The French Grand Prix would not return to the Formula One World Championship calendar until 2018.

At the previous race in Canada, Hamilton had crashed into Räikkönen in the pit lane, when Raikkönën braked to stop in front of the red light at the end of the pit lane. Williams driver Nico Rosberg then collided into the back of Hamilton. Hamilton later said that he saw the light too late and could not avoid hitting the Ferrari. Hamilton and Rosberg were both given ten place grid penalties for the French Grand Prix, meaning that whatever their qualifying position, they could start no better than 11th. After the penalty was given, McLaren's CEO, Martin Whitmarsh, said that he thought the penalty was "severe", citing a similar incident at Monaco where Raikkönën had crashed into the back of Force India's Adrian Sutil. There, no penalty had been given. However, Rosberg said that the penalties from Canada were "deserved". When Hamilton was asked whether the penalty would force him to change his approach, Hamilton said that "it doesn't really. It's a race, I'm here to win and so I approach it the same." "It's going to be harder," he added, "coming from the back, but I don't have any doubts or any worries, I think we're going to have a very strong package this weekend, and I think the car will be as good if not better than it was in the last race. With that pace, as long as we stay out of trouble we should be able to score some good points."

Renault driver Nelson Piquet Jr., who was in his first year in Formula One and had scored no points prior to this race, said that he thought that the track suited him and the car much better than previous races. BMW Sauber had taken their first victory at the previous race, but team principal Mario Theissen said that a second win was unlikely at Magny-Cours.

In technical developments, BMW Sauber, Ferrari, McLaren and Toyota all revised their front wings. BMW brought both their new wing as well as the version they had used for the previous race to Magny-Cours, but decided to use the revised wing, as it offered better levels of downforce. Ferrari's wing changes aimed at improving the performance of the car's nose hole. The nose hole, which had been introduced at the Spanish Grand Prix, aimed at creating greater levels of downforce, by channelling the airflow. Williams changed their front sidepod winglets. At the previous race, Red Bull modified their RB4's bridge wing to prevent it from flexing, to comply with the latest rule clarifications. For Magny-Cours, the team revised the central section of this element, with the aim of generating greater downforce levels.

== Practice ==
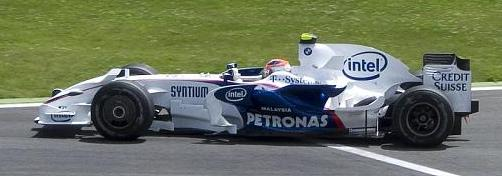
Robert Kubica led the Drivers' Championship going into the race, but only managed seventh in qualifying.

Three practice sessions were held before the Sunday race—two on Friday, and a third on Saturday. The Friday morning and afternoon sessions each lasted 90 minutes. The third session was held on Saturday morning and lasted an hour. In the first practice session, which was held in dry conditions, Ferrari's Felipe Massa was quickest, ahead of the McLarens of Hamilton and Kovalainen in second and third. Massa's teammate, Räikkönen, was fourth quickest. The afternoon session, which was held in very hot conditions, saw Renault's Fernando Alonso record the fastest lap, ahead of the two Ferrari drivers. The hot weather conditions posed several problems for the drivers, as many of the cars ran off the road, sliding through the gravel or across the asphalt. At the end of the session, a new system—designed to limit the cars' speeds in potentially hazardous situations—was tested. In the third practice session, again held in dry conditions, Renault continued their strong practice performance with Piquet leading the final practice session. Red Bull's Mark Webber was next quickest while Sebastian Vettel of Toro Rosso was third. As was the pattern for the season, the McLaren and Ferrari drivers ran heavier fuel loads in this session in preparation for the final section of qualifying.

== Qualifying ==
Saturday afternoon's qualifying session was divided into three parts. In the first 20-minute period, cars finishing 16th or lower were eliminated. The second qualifying period lasted for 15 minutes, at the end of which the fastest ten cars went into the final period, to determine their grid positions for the race. Cars failing to make the final period were allowed to be refuelled before the race but those competing in it were not, and so carried more fuel than they had done in the earlier qualifying sessions.

I am very happy with this result, not just for myself but above all for the team. So far, the weekend is going really well but of course we have yet to tackle the most important part which is the race, where anything could happen. If I was not to win, I would obviously be a bit disappointed, but the most important thing is to finish and bring home the maximum number of points, because we really need them.

— Kimi Räikkönen, following the third qualifying session.

Räikkönen clinched Ferrari's 200th pole position and his last until the 2017 Monaco Grand Prix 129 races later, with a time of 1:16.449. He was joined on the front row of the grid by teammate Massa. This would later prove to be Ferrari's last front-row lockout until the 2017 Russian Grand Prix. Alonso qualified third after Hamilton's penalty moved the quicker McLaren driver to 13th; Toyota's Jarno Trulli qualified fourth. Kovalainen would have started from fifth, but was given a five-place grid penalty for blocking Webber during qualifying and would start from 10th on the grid. Kubica, Webber, David Coulthard, Timo Glock and Piquet rounded off the top ten. Heidfeld qualified 11th, with Vettel ahead of Hamilton in 12th, and Bourdais behind in 14th. Rosberg was next quickest, but after his penalty demoted him to the back of the grid his teammate Kazuki Nakajima took his place. The final four places went to the Honda and Force India teams, with Button qualifying ahead of Barrichello, Fisichella and Sutil. Barrichello, however, was given a penalty for changing his gearbox, meaning that he started 20th on the grid, one place behind Rosberg.

=== Qualifying classification ===
Pos	No	Driver	Constructor	Part 1	Part 2	Part 3	Grid
1	1	(Finland) Kimi Räikkönen	Ferrari	1:15.133	1:15.161	1:16.449	1
2	2	(Brazil) Felipe Massa	Ferrari	1:15.024	1:15.041	1:16.490	2
3	22	(United Kingdom) Lewis Hamilton	McLaren-Mercedes	1:15.634	1:15.293	1:16.693	13^{1}
4	5	(Spain) Fernando Alonso	Renault	1:15.754	1:15.483	1:16.840	3
5	11	(Italy) Jarno Trulli	Toyota	1:15.521	1:15.362	1:16.920	4
6	23	(Finland) Heikki Kovalainen	McLaren-Mercedes	1:15.965	1:15.639	1:16.944	10^{2}
7	4	(Poland) Robert Kubica	BMW Sauber	1:15.687	1:15.723	1:17.037	5
8	10	(Australia) Mark Webber	Red Bull-Renault	1:16.020	1:15.488	1:17.233	6
9	9	(United Kingdom) David Coulthard	Red Bull-Renault	1:15.802	1:15.654	1:17.426	7
10	12	(Germany) Timo Glock	Toyota	1:15.727	1:15.558	1:17.596	8
11	6	(Brazil) Nelson Piquet Jr.	Renault	1:15.848	1:15.770		9
12	3	(Germany) Nick Heidfeld	BMW Sauber	1:16.006	1:15.786		11
13	15	(Germany) Sebastian Vettel	Toro Rosso-Ferrari	1:15.918	1:15.816		12
14	14	(France) Sébastien Bourdais	Toro Rosso-Ferrari	1:16.072	1:16.045		14
15	7	(Germany) Nico Rosberg	Williams-Toyota	1:16.085	1:16.235		19^{1}
16	8	(Japan) Kazuki Nakajima	Williams-Toyota	1:16.243			15
17	16	(United Kingdom) Jenson Button	Honda	1:16.306			16
18	17	(Brazil) Rubens Barrichello	Honda	1:16.330			20^{3}
19	21	(Italy) Giancarlo Fisichella	Force India-Ferrari	1:16.971			17
20	20	(Germany) Adrian Sutil	Force India-Ferrari	1:17.053			18

- ^1 – Nico Rosberg and Lewis Hamilton each received a ten-place grid penalty after causing a collision with Kimi Räikkönen in the previous round, the Canadian Grand Prix.
- ^2 – Heikki Kovalainen received a five-place grid penalty for blocking Mark Webber in qualifying.
- ^3 – Rubens Barrichello received a five-place grid penalty for a gearbox change.

== Race ==
The conditions on the grid were dry before the race, although the sky was overcast; weather forecasts predicted rain near the end of the race. Most of the frontrunners began the race on the harder compound tyre. Rain that had fallen earlier that morning had removed some of the rubber on the track, meaning that graining, when small grains of rubber come off a tyre, was likely to be a problem; out of the two tyre types, the harder would better cope with this. Räikkönen made a good start, retaining his first position; Massa behind him maintained his second place. Alonso, who started third, was passed by both Trulli and Kubica, but re-passed Kubica at the hairpin turn exit. Glock also made a good start, taking sixth after passing Webber. Going into the first corner, Button touched Bourdais, resulting in damage to the Honda's front wing. Hamilton, who started 13th, passed several drivers to move into 10th by the end of lap one.

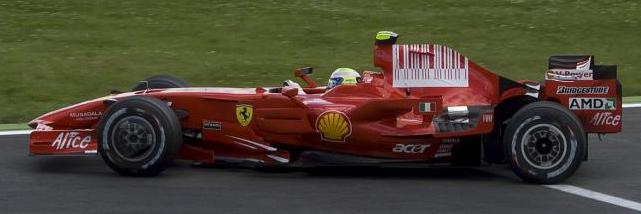
The race was won by Felipe Massa for Ferrari, moving him into the lead of the Drivers' Championship for the first time in his career.

At the end of the first lap, Räikkönen led from Massa, Trulli, Alonso, Kubica, Glock and Webber. On lap five, Hamilton overtook Kovalainen to move into ninth. On the same lap, Button was forced to make an unscheduled pit stop, due to the damage he had sustained in his first corner incident with Bourdais. This dropped him to the back of the field. By the end of lap 10, Räikkönen led Massa by 3.2 seconds, Trulli a further 8.5 seconds behind. On lap 13, Hamilton was given a drive-through penalty for cutting the corner of Turn Seven on lap one, and gaining an advantage. He took the penalty immediately, and re-emerged in 13th position. Over the next few laps, the Ferrari drivers continued to pull out a gap on Trulli in third, lapping at around a second per lap quicker than the Toyota. On lap 16, Räikkönen set the fastest lap of the race, a 1:16.630, stretching his lead over his teammate. Further back, Alonso, who had been running fourth, made the first scheduled pit stop, resuming 12th. Button was lapped by several drivers, due to the damage his car had sustained in his first corner incident with Bourdais, and eventually retired on lap 17.

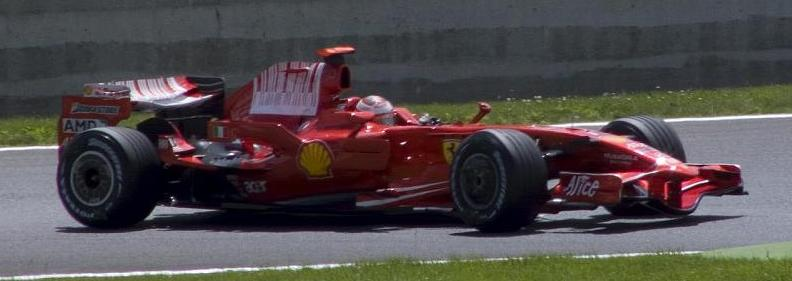
Massa's teammate Kimi Räikkönen had to settle for second place after being slowed by an exhaust failure.

On lap 20, Trulli and Kubica, then in fourth, pitted. Over the next two laps, both Räikkönen and Massa pitted. By lap 30, Räikkönen had opened his lead to 6.6 seconds over Massa, while Trulli was over half a minute behind him in third. Just before half distance, Räikkönen's pace became slower, and Massa behind him caught up, passing his teammate on lap 39. After the race, Räikkönen explained that his lack of pace was due to his car's right exhaust pipe breaking, causing the engine to lose power. Further back, Kovalainen, who was running seventh, passed Webber to take sixth.

By lap 46, Massa had a 10-second lead over his teammate. On the same lap, Kubica pitted from fourth, starting the next round of pit stops. Trulli pitted from third on lap 50, and Räikkönen and Kovalainen two laps later. Massa pitted on lap 54, and emerged 13.4 seconds ahead of Räikkönen. Trulli kept his third position, but Kovalainen, who made up several places through the pit stops to move to fourth, was closing behind him. On lap 55, light rain started to fall. Although it would continue to rain lightly for the next few laps, it was never heavy enough to be a problem to the drivers. By lap 58, Kovalainen was right behind Trulli. A few laps later, the exhaust pipe which had broken earlier on Räikkönen's car came off completely, but Räikkönen continued to race with similar lap times. Kovalainen, meanwhile, continued to try to find a way past Trulli. One lap before the end of the race, Kovalainen attempted to pass Trulli, but ran wide as Trulli defended his position.

Massa crossed the line to win the race, with Räikkönen nearly eighteen seconds behind. Trulli retained third, and took his first podium since the 2005 Spanish Grand Prix, and Toyota's first podium since the 2006 Australian Grand Prix. Kovalainen finished fourth, ahead of Kubica, Webber and Piquet, who took his first ever points in Formula One. Alonso, Coulthard, Hamilton, Glock, Vettel, Heidfeld and the lapped Barrichello, Nakajima, Rosberg, Bourdais, Fisichella and Sutil were the last of the finishing drivers.

=== Post-race ===
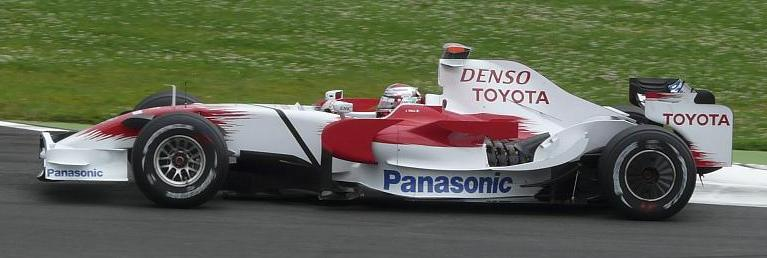
Jarno Trulli took Toyota's first podium finish since the 2006 Australian Grand Prix.

Massa was delighted with his race victory, saying, "A great race, a fantastic result. The win came my way because Kimi had a problem with his car and at the pace he was running, it would have been hard for me to beat him on the track. I would have been happy with second place but of course, the win makes me even happier." After the race, Räikkönen said,

Obviously I am a bit disappointed because I had hoped to win. Unfortunately, the right exhaust pipe broke just before half-distance and the engine lost a lot of power, especially on the straight after the slow corners. After a few laps, the situation seemed better, but towards the end of the race, I ran the risk of stopping. This sort of thing can happen in racing and I have to try and look on the bright side: eight points are still a good amount and the one-two finish is a great result for the team. Luckily, I had built up quite a good lead in the first part thanks to a car that was really very competitive.

Trulli said, "Today was a great race, hard and tough. We had a good pace, even if we had to battle with some cars that were quicker than us. I had to fight really hard but that is what people should expect both from myself and from Toyota." Hamilton commented on his drive-through penalty: "My drive-through penalty was an extremely close call: I felt I'd got past Vettel fairly and was ahead going into the corner. But I was on the outside and couldn't turn-in in case we both crashed, then I lost the back-end and drove over the kerb."

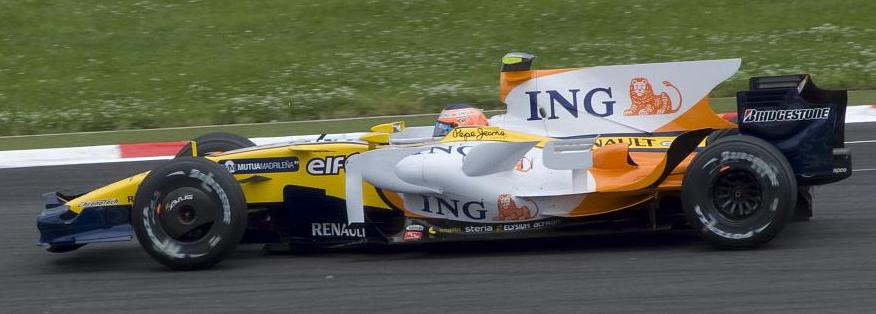
Nelson Piquet Jr. took his first ever points in Formula One, in his eighth race.

After BMW Sauber's victory at the previous race, their director, Mario Theissen, said that "over the entire weekend here our package did not work perfectly", while driver Heidfeld said that it was a "disappointing result". Alonso said that he felt disappointed after his poor start to the race. Red Bull's director, Christian Horner, said that their problems lay in the bad starts their drivers had made. Button, who retired during the race, commented on his collision: "I got a good start and was alongside Bourdais. I thought he was going to turn in at turn one and close the door so I pulled in behind him and then unfortunately hit him in the rear as everything slowed down for the corner. I could feel that there was something broken at the front of the car as there was an air coming in from the front, but the car was driveable and I was staying with the back of the pack so I continued. We replaced the nose but the bargeboards had been pulled off and the car had become undriveable so I had to retire." Piquet scored his first points in Formula One in the race, having failed to score up to that point. He said that he was happy, and hoped that the team could "continue like this for the rest of the season".

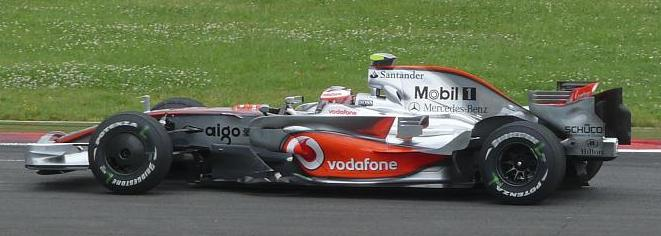
Heikki Kovalainen took fourth for McLaren.

After the race, Massa moved into the lead of the Drivers' Championship, on 48 points, taking the Championship lead for the first time in his Formula One career (and becoming the first Brazilian driver to lead the championship since 1993, after Ayrton Senna won the Monaco Grand Prix that year). Kubica lost the lead of the Drivers' Championship, falling two points behind Massa. Räikkönen moved ahead of Hamilton, on 43 points, while Hamilton was five points further behind. Heidfeld remained fifth. Before the race, Ferrari had been just three points ahead of BMW in the Constructors' Championship; after the race, Ferrari moved into a comfortable 17 point advantage. McLaren made up one point on BMW, although they were still 16 points behind.

=== Race classification ===
Pos	No	Driver	Constructor	Laps	Time/Retired	Grid	Points
1	2	(Brazil) Felipe Massa	Ferrari	70	1:31:50.245	2	10
2	1	(Finland) Kimi Räikkönen	Ferrari	70	+17.984	1	8
3	11	(Italy) Jarno Trulli	Toyota	70	+28.250	4	6
4	23	(Finland) Heikki Kovalainen	McLaren-Mercedes	70	+28.929	10	5
5	4	(Poland) Robert Kubica	BMW Sauber	70	+30.512	5	4
6	10	(Australia) Mark Webber	Red Bull-Renault	70	+40.304	6	3
7	6	(Brazil) Nelson Piquet Jr.	Renault	70	+41.033	9	2
8	5	(Spain) Fernando Alonso	Renault	70	+43.372	3	1
9	9	(United Kingdom) David Coulthard	Red Bull-Renault	70	+51.021	7	
10	22	(United Kingdom) Lewis Hamilton	McLaren-Mercedes	70	+54.538	13	
11	12	(Germany) Timo Glock	Toyota	70	+57.700	8	
12	15	(Germany) Sebastian Vettel	Toro Rosso-Ferrari	70	+58.065	12	
13	3	(Germany) Nick Heidfeld	BMW Sauber	70	+1:02.079	11	
14	17	(Brazil) Rubens Barrichello	Honda	69	+1 lap	20	
15	8	(Japan) Kazuki Nakajima	Williams-Toyota	69	+1 lap	15	
16	7	(Germany) Nico Rosberg	Williams-Toyota	69	+1 lap	19	
17	14	(France) Sébastien Bourdais	Toro Rosso-Ferrari	69	+1 lap	14	
18	21	(Italy) Giancarlo Fisichella	Force India-Ferrari	69	+1 lap	17	
19	20	(Germany) Adrian Sutil	Force India-Ferrari	69	+1 lap	18	
Ret	16	(United Kingdom) Jenson Button	Honda	16	Collision damage	16	

== Championship standings after the race ==
Drivers' Championship standings

	Pos.	Driver	Points
1	1	(Brazil) Felipe Massa	48
1	2	(Poland) Robert Kubica	46
1	3	(Finland) Kimi Räikkönen	43
1	4	(United Kingdom) Lewis Hamilton	38
	5	(Germany) Nick Heidfeld	28

Constructors' Championship standings

Pos.	Constructor	Points
1	(Italy) Ferrari	91
2	(Germany) BMW Sauber	74
3	(United Kingdom) McLaren-Mercedes	58
4	(Austria) Red Bull-Renault	24
5	(Japan) Toyota	23

- Note: Only the top five positions are included for both sets of standings.

== See also ==
- 2008 Magny-Cours GP2 Series round

Previous race: 2008 Canadian Grand Prix	FIA Formula One World Championship; 2008 season	Next race: 2008 British Grand Prix
Previous race: 2007 French Grand Prix	French Grand Prix	Next race: 2018 French Grand Prix
