= Markus Duesmann =

German business executive (born 1969)

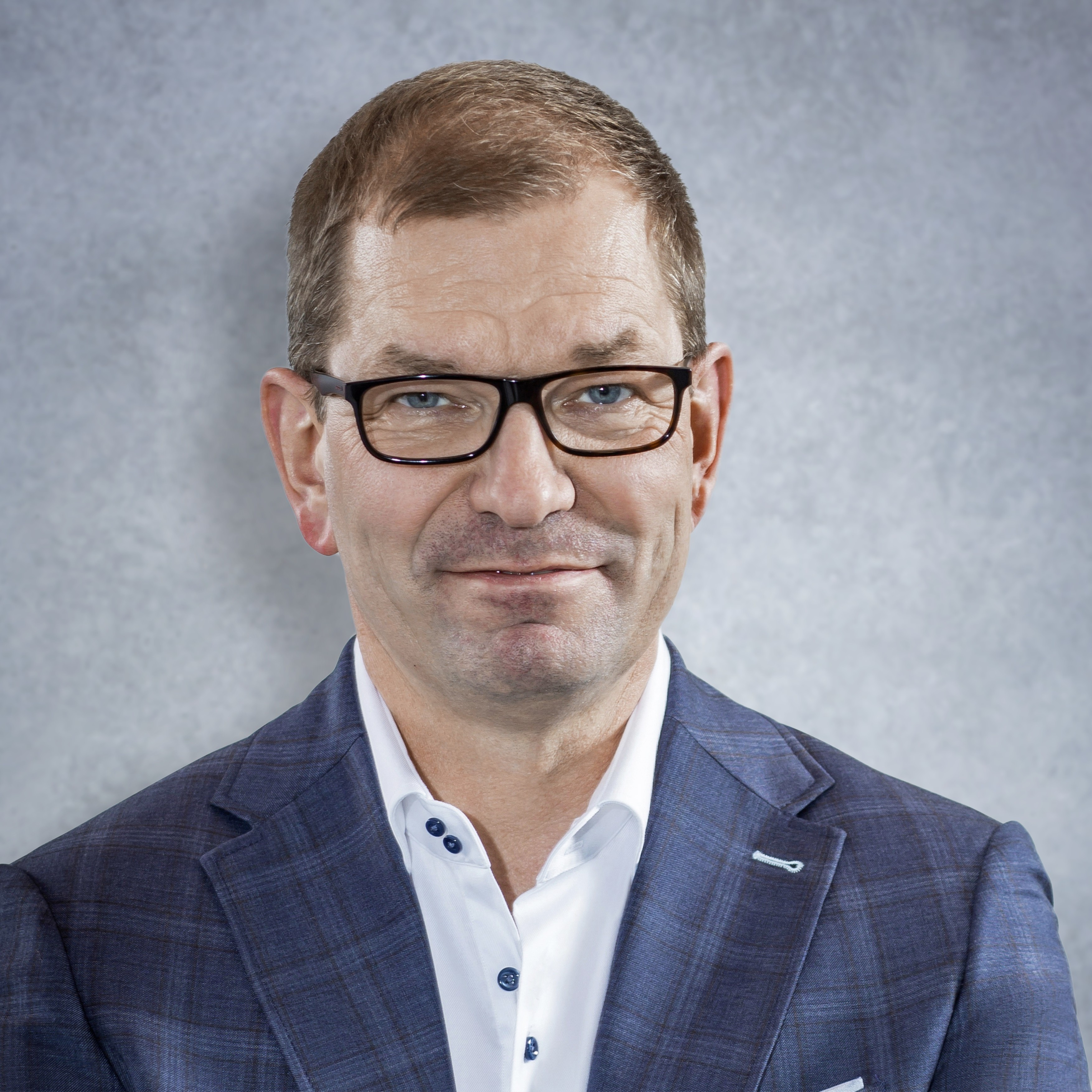
- Markus Duesmann, 2018
- Born: Markus Bernhard Duesmann; 23 June 1969 (age 57); Heek, North Rhine-Westphalia, West Germany
- Education: Münster University of Applied Sciences
- Occupations: Chairman of the Board of Management, Audi; Member of the Board of Management, Volkswagen Group
- Years active: 1992–present
- Board member of: FC Bayern Munich

Markus Bernhard Duesmann (born 23 June 1969) is a German automotive manager and was Chairman of the Board of Management of Audi from 2020 to 2023. As a member of the Board of Management of the Volkswagen Group, he was responsible for Audi, Bentley, Ducati, and Lamborghini, too.

== Early life and education ==
Duesmann spent his childhood in Rheine, Westphalia. After graduating from high school (1988), he studied mechanical engineering at the Münster University of Applied Sciences in Steinfurt until 1991.

== Career ==
Duesmann began his career as an engineer at Mercedes-Benz in Stuttgart. Later he moved to the development service provider FEV in Aachen. There he headed the engine division. In 2004, Duesmann returned to Stuttgart to DaimlerChrysler, the parent company of Mercedes-Benz. In 2005 he became head of development for the F1 engines at McLaren-Mercedes.

At the beginning of 2007, Duesmann joined the BMW Group. There he was initially responsible for engine development for the BMW Sauber F1 team. He then worked his way into BMW's series production development. In 2016, Duesmann was appointed to the Board of Management of the BMW Group. Under his leadership, the company signed a billion-dollar collaboration with CATL.

In 2020, Duesmann was appointed to the Board of Management of the Volkswagen Group. The same year, he became Chairman of the Board of Management of Audi, which is part of the Volkswagen Group. Duesmann's main task was realigning the company after the diesel scandal. He called for a faster transition to battery electric vehicles (BEV) and set a definite end date for the production of ICE models at Audi. In 2022, he announced Audi's entry into Formula One starting 2026.

Duesmann left the company in 2023. He was succeeded by Gernot Döllner as Chairman of the Board of Management of Audi.

== Other boards ==
While working for Volkswagen and Audi, Duesmann has assumed further mandates in Group companies. Furthermore, Duesmann was elected to the supervisory board of FC Bayern Munich AG in 2021; he was appointed second chairman of the board.
