= 2008 Canadian Grand Prix =

2008 Canadian Formula One race held in Montreal

Coordinates: 45°30′00″N 73°31′22″W

Race 7 of 18 in the 2008 Formula One World Championship
← Previous race	Next race →

Race details
- Date: June 8, 2008
- Official name: Formula 1 Grand Prix du Canada 2008
- Location: Circuit Gilles Villeneuve, Montreal, Quebec, Canada
- Course: Street circuit
- Course length: 4.361 km (2.710 miles)
- Distance: 70 laps, 305.270 km (189.686 miles)
- Weather: Hot with temperatures approaching 31 °C (88 °F); wind speeds up to 8.9 kilometres per hour (5.5 mph)

Pole position
Driver	(United Kingdom) Lewis Hamilton	McLaren-Mercedes
- Time: 1:17.886

Fastest lap
Driver	(Finland) Kimi Räikkönen	Ferrari
- Time: 1:17.387 on lap 14

Podium
First	(Poland) Robert Kubica	BMW Sauber
Second	(Germany) Nick Heidfeld	BMW Sauber
Third	(United Kingdom) David Coulthard	Red Bull-Renault

The 2008 Canadian Grand Prix, formally the Formula 1 Grand Prix du Canada 2008, was a Formula One motor race held on 8 June 2008 at the Circuit Gilles Villeneuve. It was the 7th race of the 2008 Formula One World Championship. The 70-lap race was won by Robert Kubica for the BMW Sauber team after starting from second position. Kubica's teammate Nick Heidfeld finished second, with David Coulthard third in a Red Bull, taking the 62nd and final podium of his F1 career. Lewis Hamilton, who started from pole position, failed to finish the race, retiring on lap 19 after crashing into the back of Kimi Räikkönen's Ferrari car in the pit lane.

As of 2026, this is the last victory for a BMW-powered car, the only race to be won by a Polish and Eastern European driver, the last podium finish by a Scottish driver. Kubica's win promoted him into the lead of the World Drivers' Championship for the first time in his career, overtaking Hamilton, Räikkönen and Massa. Massa and Hamilton tied for second place, four points behind Kubica, while Räikkönen was fourth. In the World Constructors' Championship, BMW-Sauber passed McLaren for second position, three points behind Ferrari.

== Report ==
=== Background ===
The Grand Prix was contested by 20 drivers, in ten teams of two. The teams, also known as "constructors", were Ferrari, McLaren-Mercedes, Renault, BMW Sauber, Honda, Force India, Toyota, Red Bull Racing, Williams and Toro Rosso.

Before the race, McLaren driver Lewis Hamilton led the Drivers' Championship, with 38 points, ahead of Ferrari's Kimi Räikkönen, on 35 points and his teammate Felipe Massa on 34 points. BMW driver Robert Kubica was fourth, ahead of Kubica's teammate Nick Heidfeld in fifth. In the Constructors Championship, Ferrari were leading on 69 points; 16 points ahead of McLaren with 53 points; BMW were a further point behind them in third.

Ahead of the race, the organizers unveiled a new paddock and media center facilities at Circuit Gilles Villeneuve. Also the site where Robert Kubica crashed in the previous year's race was modified. The wall on which Kubica crashed was moved closer to the track to decrease angle of impact. Additionally, debris fencing was put on the wall to prevent any hazard to cars on the other side of the wall.

=== Practice and qualifying ===
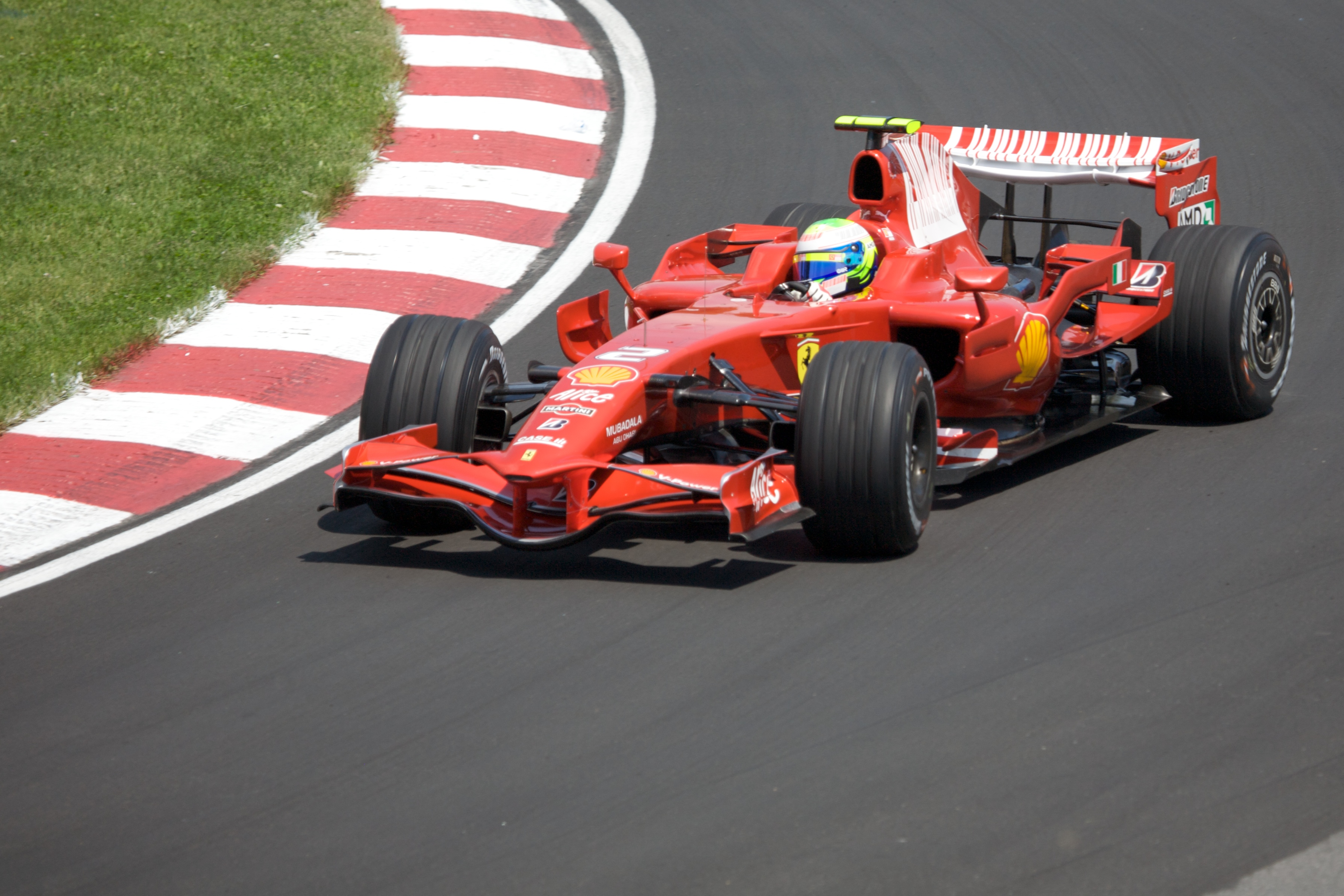
Felipe Massa, seen here correcting oversteer, set the fastest lap time in the first free practice session on Friday.

Three practice sessions were held before the Sunday race—two on Friday, and a third on Saturday. The Friday morning and afternoon sessions each lasted 90 minutes. The third session was held on Saturday morning and lasted an hour. The Friday practice session started in wet conditions which resulted in most of the drivers venturing out in the latter half of the hour, some of them, such as Lewis Hamilton, emerging only during final minutes of the session. Ferrari's Felipe Massa recorded the fastest lap in this session, followed by Robert Kubica and Heikki Kovalainen. In the second session of the day, Lewis Hamilton aced while Kubica continued to record good timings at number two. Kimi Räikkönen recorded third fastest lap time compared to his fifth fastest in the earlier session. Timo Glock suffered a minor accident after he hit the wall on turn four. Nico Rosberg, however, sprung a surprise by topping the Saturday session ahead of Räikkönen and Hamilton. The session was red flagged 45 minutes in when Toro Rosso's Sebastian Vettel hit the wall after losing control at turn nine, resulting in a number of drivers being unable to complete their flying laps. Further, Vettel's teammate Sébastien Bourdais suffered a crash at turn five.

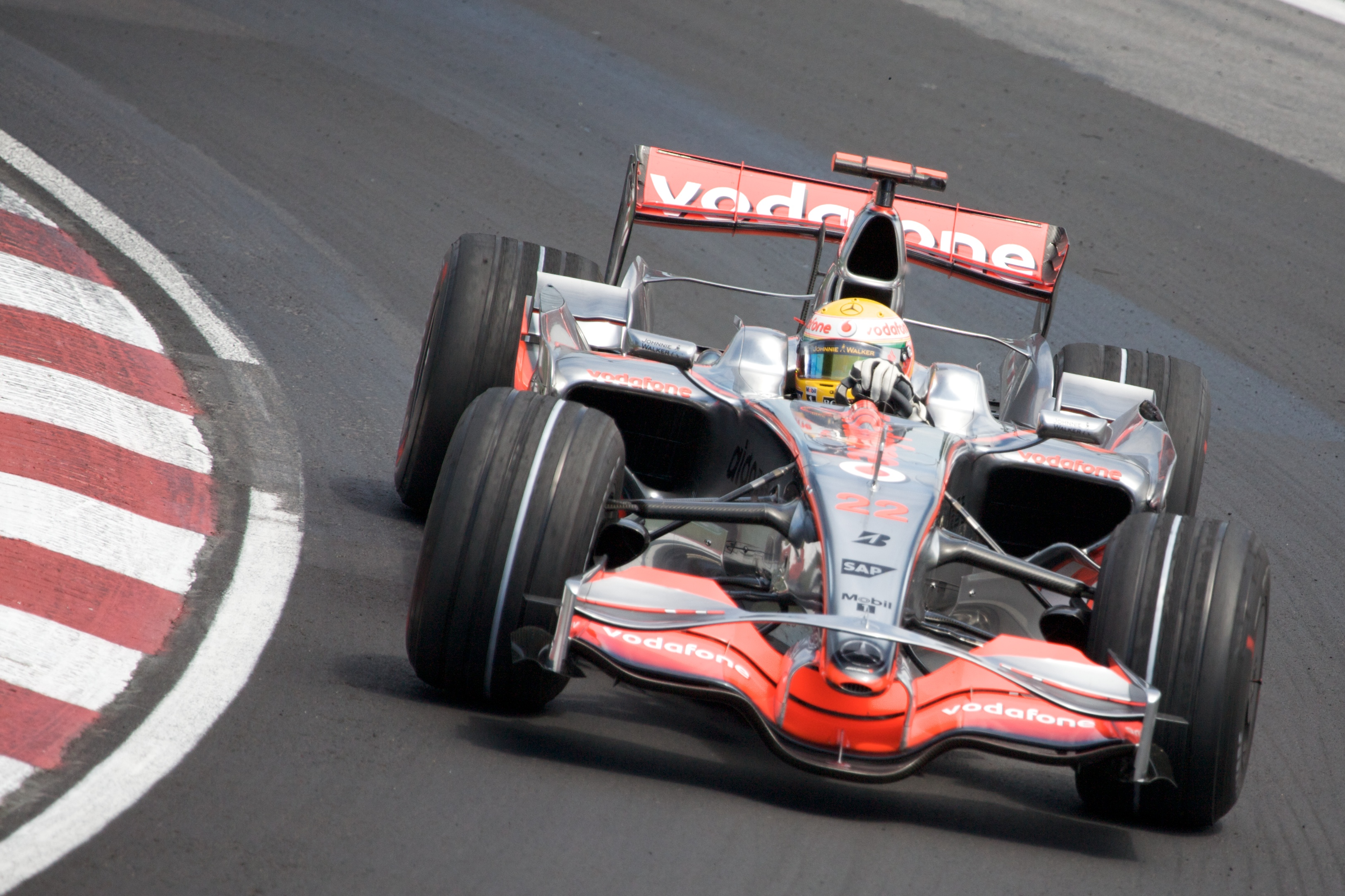
Lewis Hamilton took pole position for McLaren.

Saturday afternoon's qualifying session was divided into three parts. In the first 20-minute period, cars finishing 16th or lower were eliminated. The second qualifying period lasted for 15 minutes, at the end of which the fastest ten cars went into the final period, to determine their grid positions for the race. Cars failing to make the final period were allowed to be refuelled before the race but those competing in it were not, and so carried more fuel than they had done in the earlier qualifying sessions.

Lewis Hamilton recorded the fastest time for the session, ahead of Felipe Massa and Heikki Kovalainen. Sebastian Vettel's poor season continued after he could not compete the qualifying following his crash in third practice session. Others eliminated in this session were Sébastien Bourdais, Adrian Sutil, Giancarlo Fisichella and Jenson Button. Bourdais received a five place grid penalty due to a gearbox change following the earlier practice session. Button too suffered a gearbox problem during his first lap run and clocked the slowest time for the session.

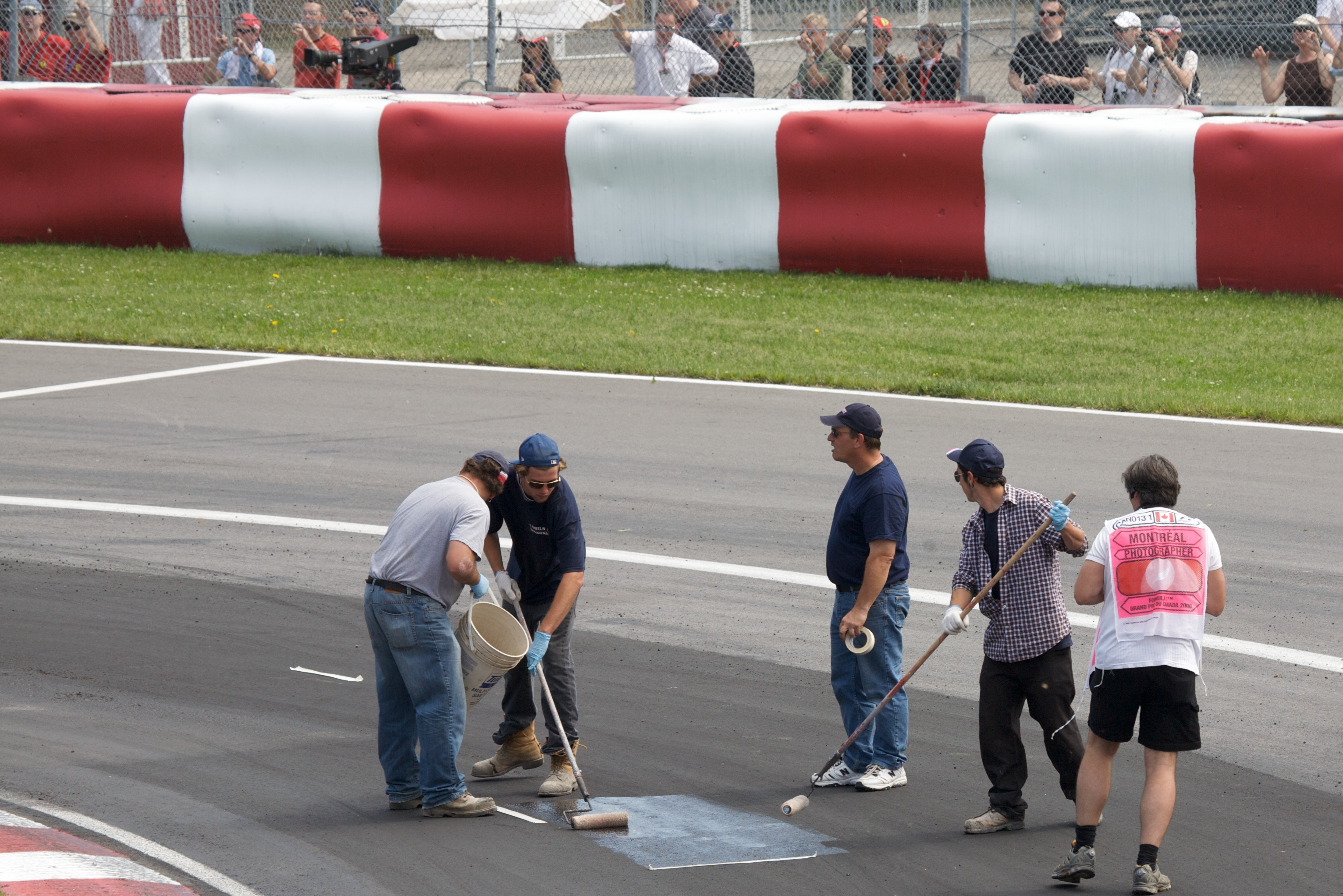
Resurfaced sections of the track began to break up in practice and qualifying and had to be repaired on numerous occasions.

Qualifying conditions were hampered by a disintegrating track, which caused most drivers to record slower times than in Q1. Track officials were seen clearing the track of debris in between sessions. Toyota's Jarno Trulli suffered significantly from these conditions, his car spinning twice during the second session. Trulli, along with Timo Glock, Kazuki Nakajima, David Coulthard and Nelson Piquet Jr., was unable to progress to the next session.

Hamilton once again topped this session, with Massa and Räikkönen coming second and third respectively.

Hamilton recorded quick times during early laps of the session, which were only surpassed by Robert Kubica towards the end of the session. But Hamilton on his final flying lap overcame Kubica's time claiming his second pole position at Montreal. Räikkönen came in third with teammate Massa pushed down to sixth position. Fernando Alonso and Nico Rosberg exhibited remarkable performances, taking positions four and five respectively.

Mark Webber, who also became a victim of the breaking track surface, could not compete in Q3 after damaging his car at the end of second session.

=== Race ===
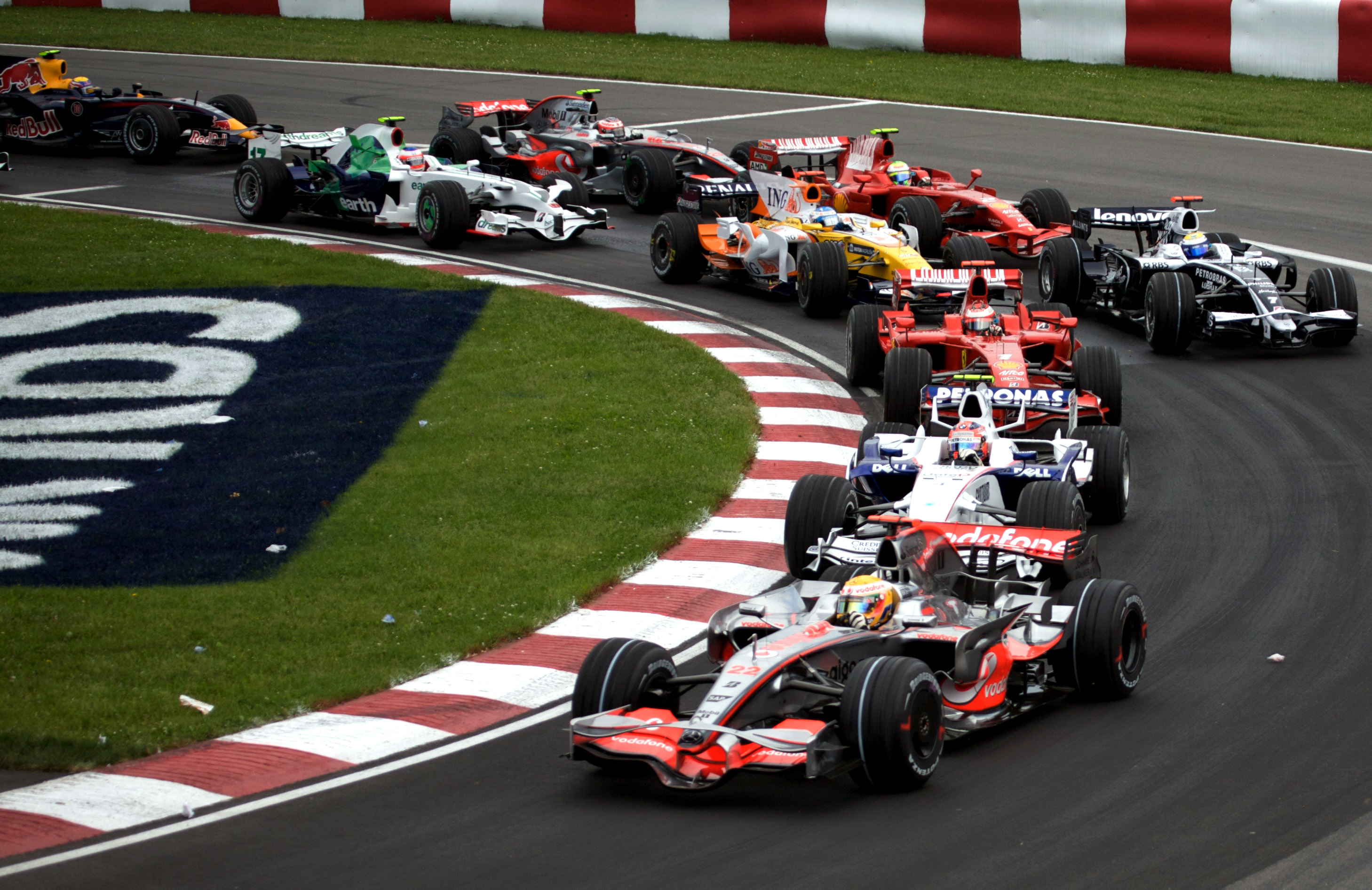
Lewis Hamilton leads Robert Kubica, Kimi Räikkönen and the rest of the field at the start of the race.

There was severe criticism from drivers about track conditions. The track was said to be breaking up on turn two, the exit of turn seven and also the apex and exit of turn 10. The authorities applied chemicals on turn 2 and carried out further resurfacing of track on turn 11 – the hairpin – following Saturday's qualifying session.

After overnight track work to fix problems with the track at turn 10, the race started with Hamilton holding his lead and all the cars making it through the first corner. Hamilton built up a lead of over 5 seconds over Robert Kubica before Adrian Sutil had a gearbox failure on the 16th lap and parked his car after turn 3. Sutil's car was off the track but after it caught fire the safety car was brought out, and there was a rush of drivers into the pits as all of the six lead drivers went in for their pit stops. Hamilton led Räikkönen and Kubica into the pitlane but Räikkönen took the lead as they left their garages, with Kubica alongside him and Hamilton behind.

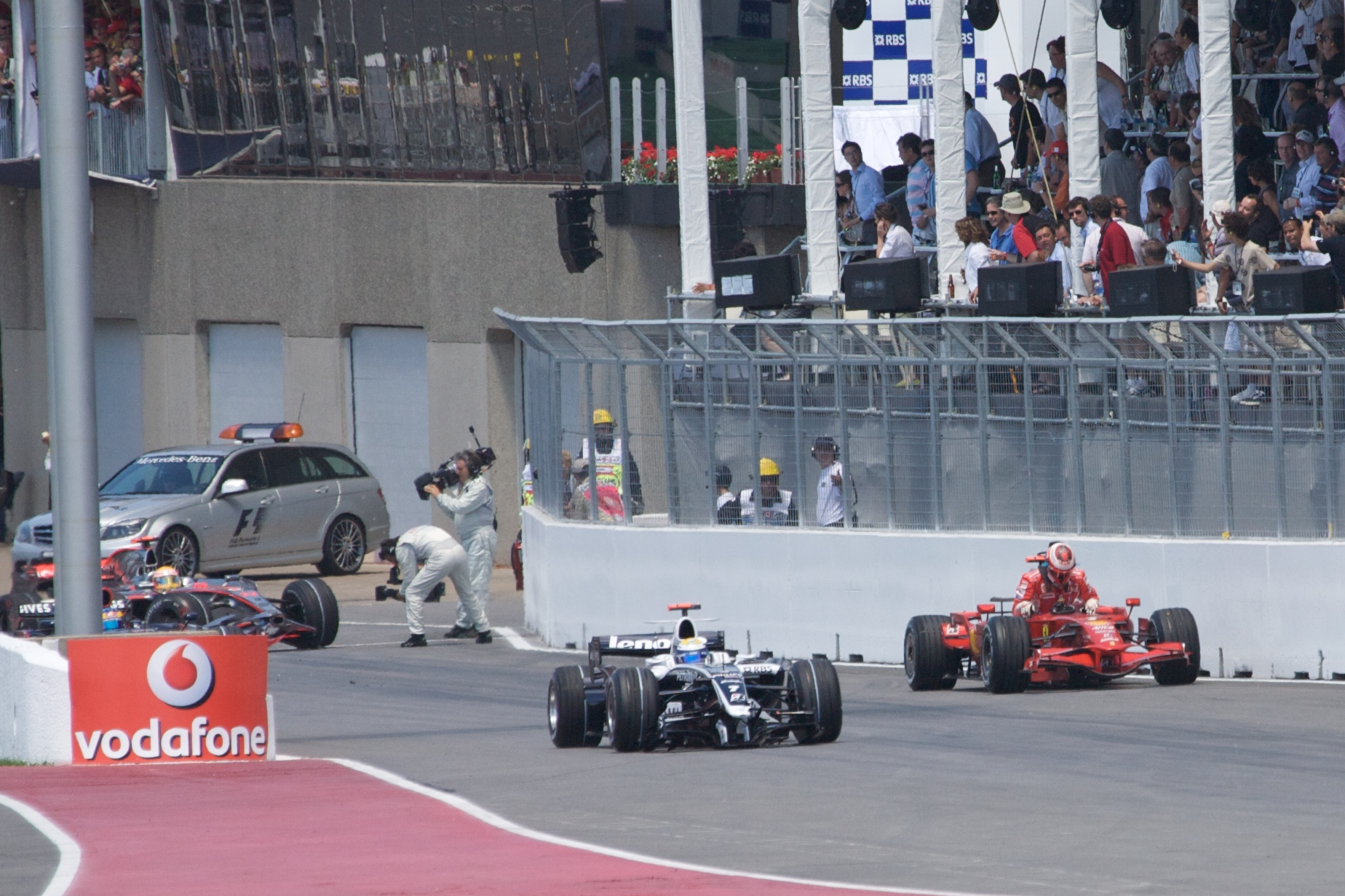
In the aftermath of the collision, Kimi Räikkönen and Hamilton retired from the race, whilst Nico Rosberg continued with a broken front wing.

"...as I exited the box, I saw two cars jostling for position ahead of me in the pit lane. Obviously, I didn't want to get involved in their tussle, and was trying not to do so, and then all of a sudden they stopped. And by the time they'd come to a halt, it was too late for me to avoid them."

— Lewis Hamilton.

Räikkönen came to a stop at the end of the pit lane as the exit was closed, with the red indicator light on. Räikkönen was alongside Kubica at the end of the pit lane when Hamilton sped towards them not noticing the red light at first. Hamilton slid into the back of Räikkönen's car, with Nico Rosberg further hitting the back of Hamilton. Both Hamilton and Räikkönen retired from the race, each leaving their vehicles at the exit of the pitlane. Rosberg continued the race, but stopped again for a new wing. Meanwhile, Massa had to make a second stop in the following lap, as his car had not been refuelled during his first stop due to technical problems. Hamilton later said that he saw the light too late and could not avoid hitting the Ferrari. It was Hamilton's only retirement of the 2008 season.

There were seven different race leaders over the next section of the race until most of the drivers each took pit stops leaving Heidfeld in the lead. Kubica was in a much lighter and faster car and overtook Heidfeld after only his first lap out of the pits.

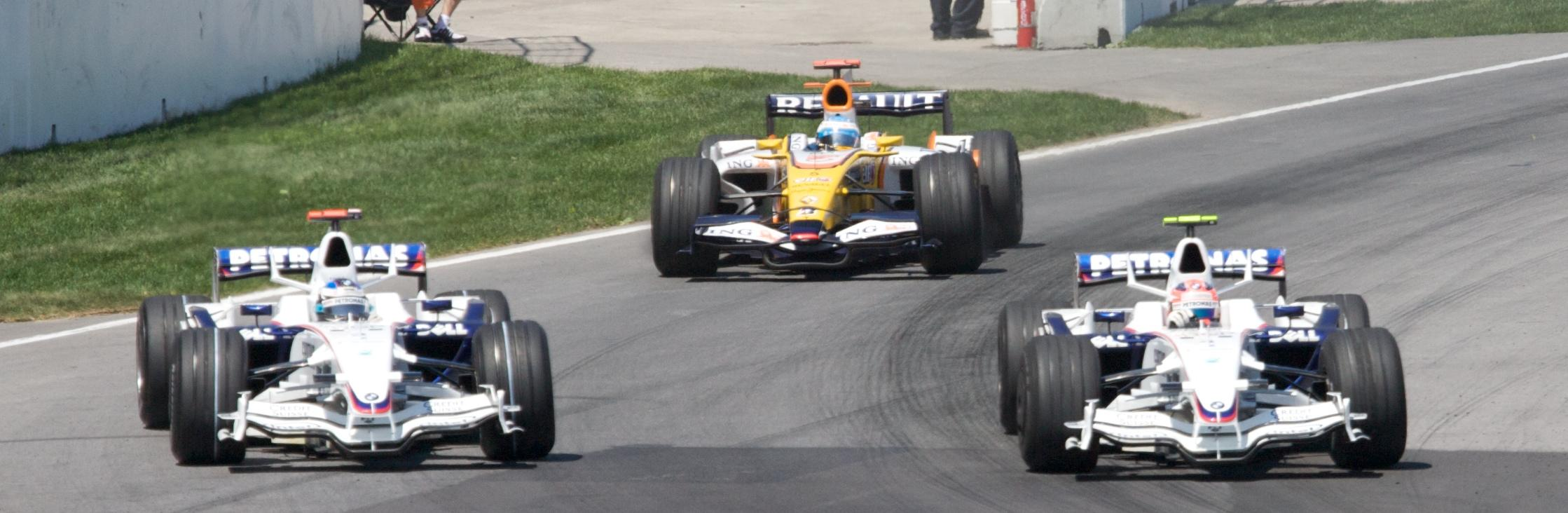
Kubica passing teammate Nick Heidfeld after both had made their first pitstops.

The remainder of the race had fewer incidents, despite the surface of the circuit severely degrading over the course of the race. Nelson Piquet Jr. suffered another retirement, his fifth of the year from seven races, on the 39th lap because of abnormal brake wear. Piquet had also spun off the circuit earlier in the race while running in a points-scoring position due to brake failure, but fell to the back of the field before he reversed his car to get back onto the track. Piquet's teammate at Renault F1 and former world champion Fernando Alonso was running in a strong third place and was pushing Nick Heidfeld for second place before spinning off and damaging his front wing and suspension. Kazuki Nakajima broke his front wing after hitting the back of Jenson Button in turn ten on the 46th lap, and was forced to retire when the front wing detached itself completely and was stuck under the chassis as he was about to enter pitlane. Giancarlo Fisichella was running last after his car engine stalled during his first pit stop, and later he spun and hit the wall after the chicane at turn nine.

Felipe Massa fought back towards the end of the race, after finding himself last since making three pit stops in total due to earlier incidents. Massa overtook both Barrichello and Kovalainen at the same time through the hairpin at turn ten as his rivals struggled for grip. With a few laps to spare the Brazilian overtook Jarno Trulli when the Italian got caught up behind Timo Glock, who was recovering from running wide at turn two.

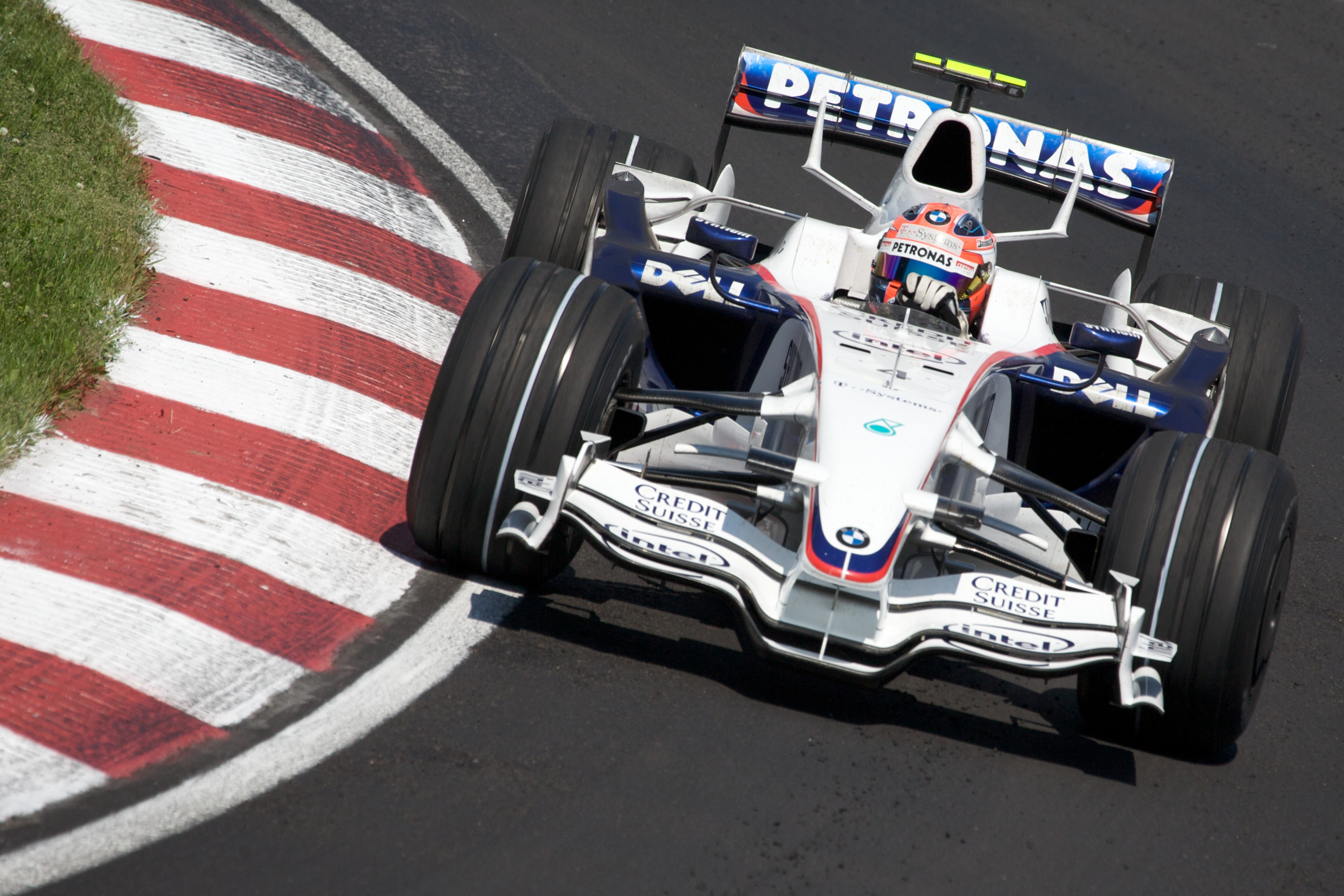
The race was won by Robert Kubica, who took his and BMW Sauber's only F1 victory.

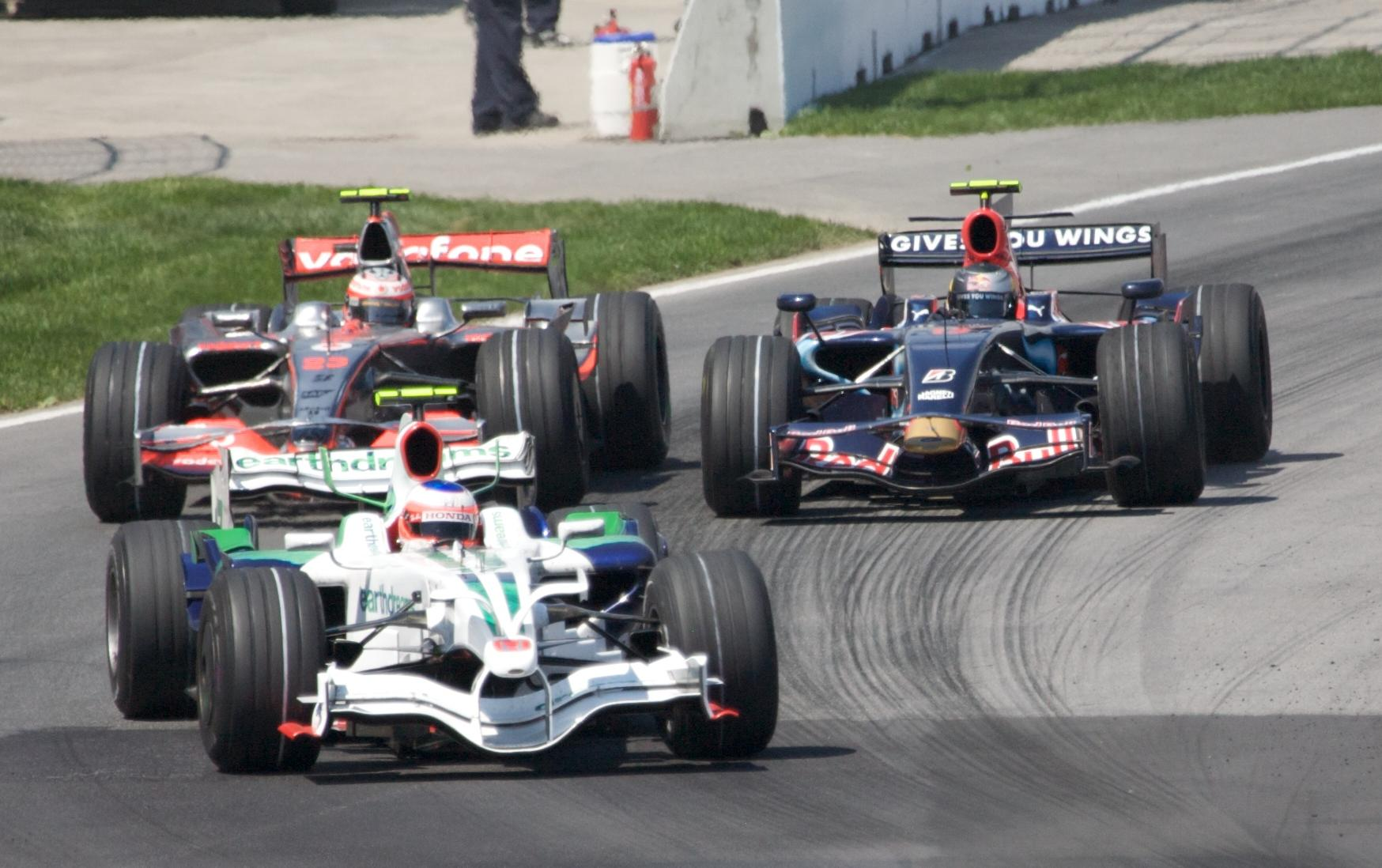
A late-race scrap between Rubens Barrichello, Sebastian Vettel and Heikki Kovalainen provided on-track entertainment.

Kubica had built up a substantial lead over the course of the race and was never threatened while he raced towards the finish. Heidfeld held onto second place leading to the first one-two finish for the BMW Sauber team. David Coulthard finished third to score his first points of the season and his first podium finish since the 2006 Monaco Grand Prix, but had to run to the podium after his car ran out of fuel 50 meters from where the podium finishers park. Toyota drivers finished fourth and sixth, with Massa between them in fifth. Barrichello kept the seventh position and Vettel defended eighth place from Kovalainen. Thus, no McLaren driver finished in the points for the first time since the 2006 United States Grand Prix, and neither Ferrari nor McLaren took a podium finish for the first time since the 2006 Malaysian Grand Prix. Kovalainen, Rosberg, Button, Webber and the lapped Bourdais were the last of the finishing drivers.

The win for BMW Sauber marked the first time a German constructor had won a Formula One Grand Prix since the 1962 French Grand Prix (with Dan Gurney for Porsche), as well as the first and only win for BMW engines since the 2004 Brazilian Grand Prix which Juan Pablo Montoya won for Williams. This was also the last time a Formula One Grand Prix was won by a car built neither in Great Britain nor in Italy.

=== Post-race ===
The top three finishers appeared on the podium and in the subsequent press conference. Kubica was delighted with his first race victory, saying, "I'm very happy at having won the first race for the BMW Sauber F1 Team. I'm also happy for Poland and all my fans. It was a very difficult race for me. I started on the dirty side of the track and Kimi Raikkonen was nearly able to pass me, but I just managed to keep him behind." After the race, Heidfeld said,

Congratulations to Robert for winning this race, which he really deserved! I made a poor start and lost a position to Rubens Barrichello. Fortunately I was able to pass him, and from this moment on I was one of the fastest cars on the track. I stayed out when most of the other cars pitted because I was on a long stint. I was pushing very hard at that stage. We then decided to switch to a one stop strategy, with a very high fuel load and with the soft option tyres which was a challenge.

Coulthard said, "I'm delighted to get a podium for the team, they've had a lot of work on at the previous races and back at base. You can expect some unusual results here, so we fuelled it long; but we expected the incidents would occur on track, not in the pit lane."

Hamilton and Rosberg were both given ten place grid penalties for the French Grand Prix, meaning that whatever their qualifying position, they could start no better than 11th. After the penalty was given, McLaren's CEO, Martin Whitmarsh, said that he thought the penalty was "severe", citing a similar incident at Monaco where Räikkönen had crashed into the back of Force India's Adrian Sutil. There, no penalty had been given. However, Rosberg said that the penalties were "deserved".

After the race, Kubica moved into the lead of the Drivers' Championship, on 42 points, taking the Championship lead for the first time in his Formula One career. Hamilton lost the lead of the Drivers' Championship, falling four points behind Kubica. Massa tied on points with Hamilton, while Räikkönen was three points further behind. Heidfeld remained fifth. Before the race, Ferrari had been 16 points ahead of McLaren in the Constructors' Championship; after the race, BMW moved up into second position and reduced Ferrari's lead to 3 points. McLaren fell down to third place, 17 points behind BMW.

== Classification ==
=== Qualifying ===
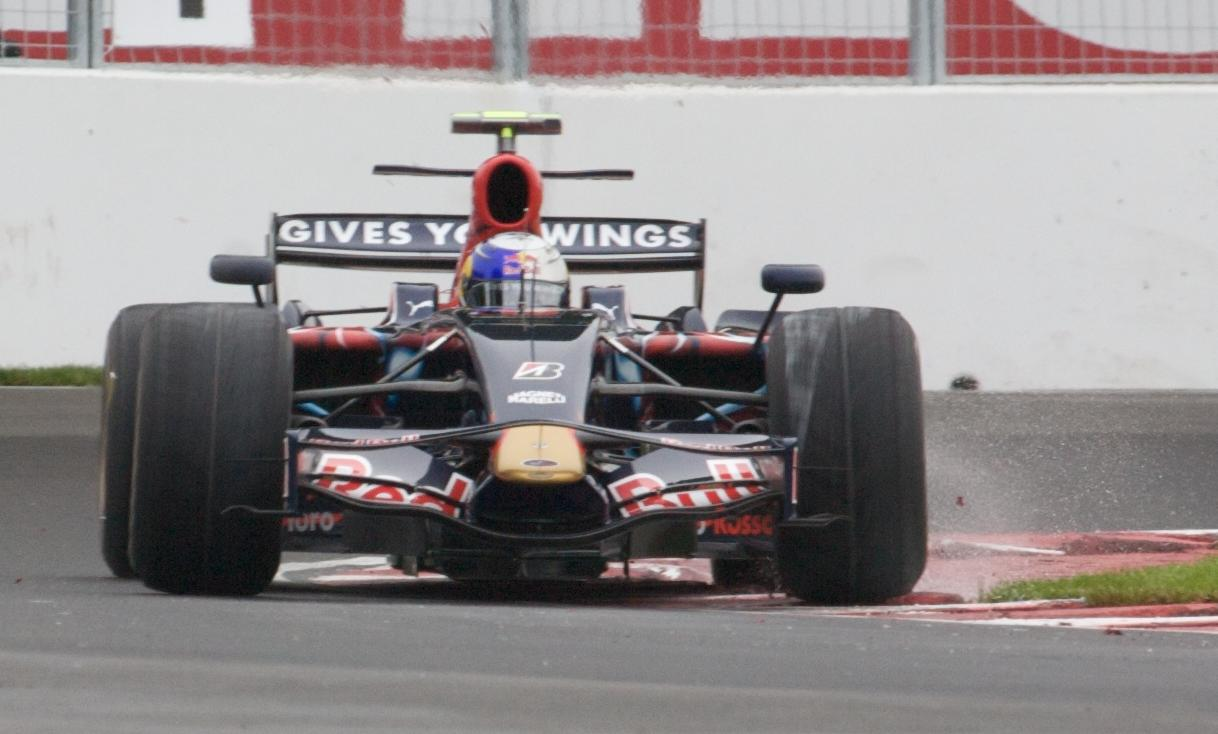
Sebastian Vettel could not take part in qualifying

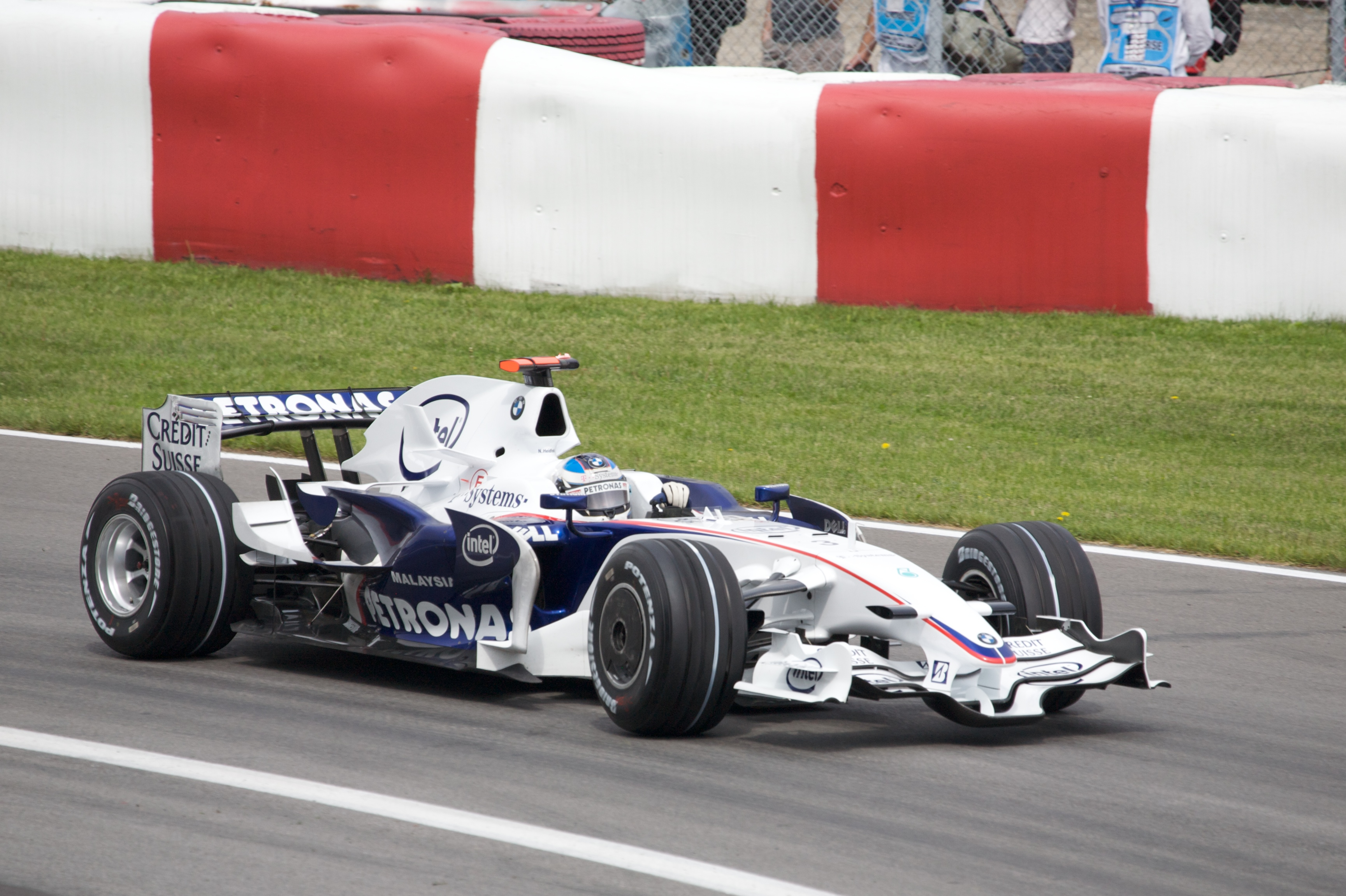
Nick Heidfeld finished second to make it a BMW Sauber one-two.

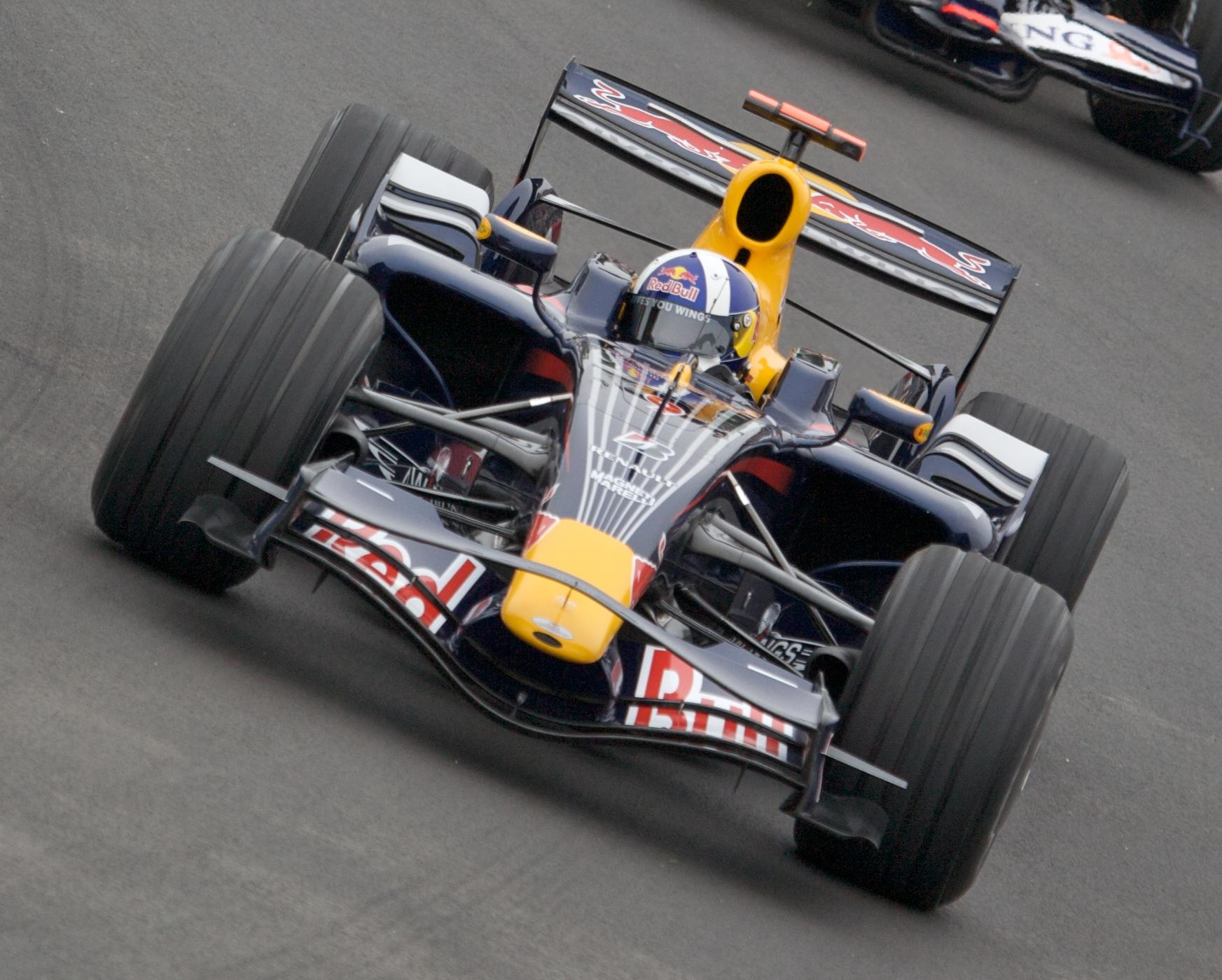
David Coulthard finished third for Red Bull Racing, his last podium in Formula One.

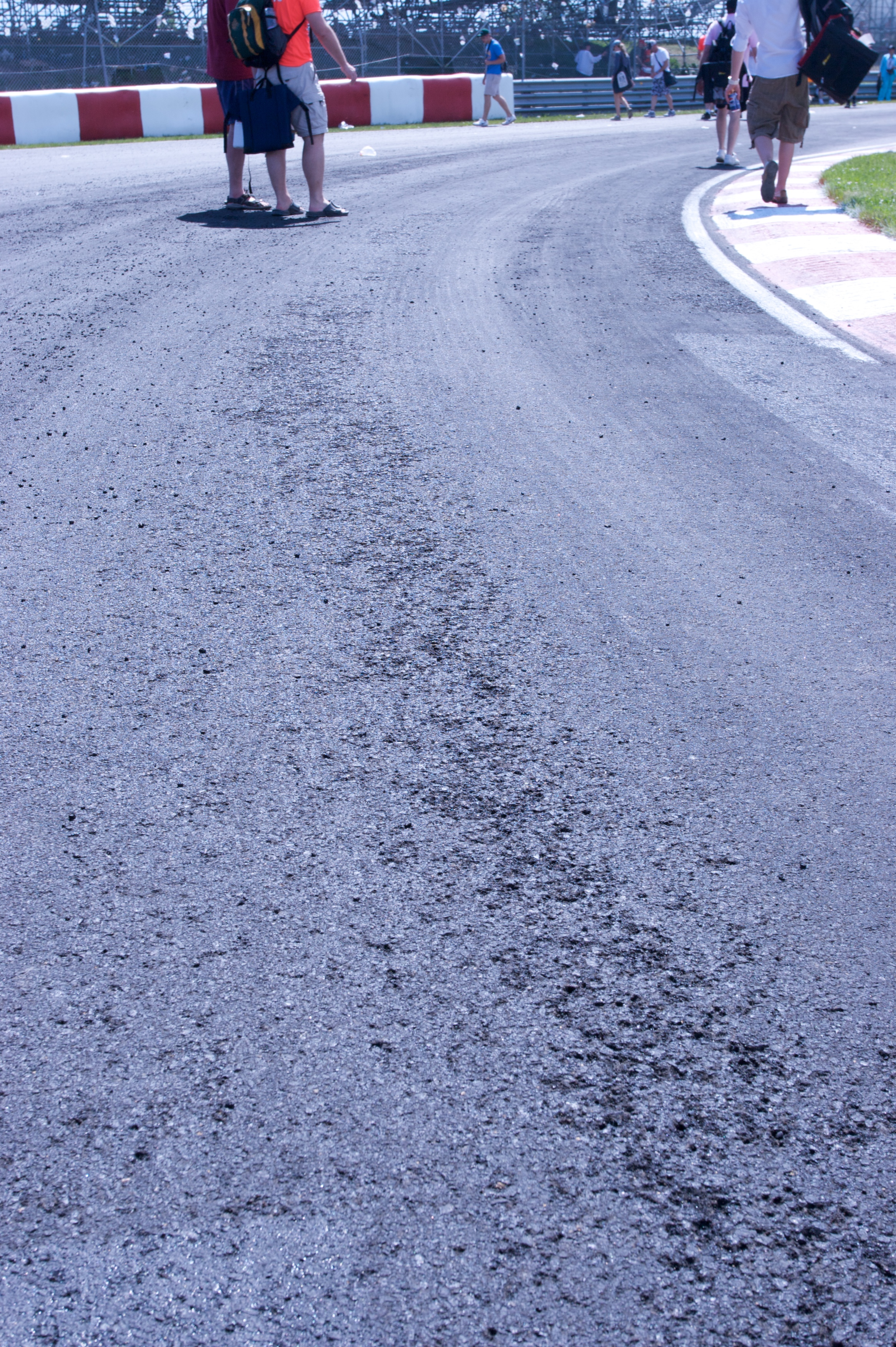
The track surface was significantly worn by the end of the Grand Prix.

Pos.	No.	Driver	Constructor	Part 1	Part 2	Part 3	Grid
1	22	(United Kingdom) Lewis Hamilton	McLaren-Mercedes	1:16.909	1:17.034	1:17.886	1
2	4	(Poland) Robert Kubica	BMW Sauber	1:17.471	1:17.679	1:18.498	2
3	1	(Finland) Kimi Räikkönen	Ferrari	1:17.301	1:17.364	1:18.735	3
4	5	(Spain) Fernando Alonso	Renault	1:17.415	1:17.488	1:18.746	4
5	7	(Germany) Nico Rosberg	Williams-Toyota	1:17.991	1:17.891	1:18.844	5
6	2	(Brazil) Felipe Massa	Ferrari	1:17.231	1:17.353	1:19.048	6
7	23	(Finland) Heikki Kovalainen	McLaren-Mercedes	1:17.287	1:17.684	1:19.089	7
8	3	(Germany) Nick Heidfeld	BMW Sauber	1:18.082	1:17.781	1:19.633	8
9	17	(Brazil) Rubens Barrichello	Honda	1:18.256	1:18.020	1:20.848	9
10	10	(Australia) Mark Webber	Red Bull-Renault	1:17.582	1:17.523	No time^{1}	10
11	12	(Germany) Timo Glock	Toyota	1:18.321	1:18.031		11
12	8	(Japan) Kazuki Nakajima	Williams-Toyota	1:17.638	1:18.062		12
13	9	(United Kingdom) David Coulthard	Red Bull-Renault	1:18.168	1:18.238		13
14	11	(Italy) Jarno Trulli	Toyota	1:18.039	1:18.327		14
15	6	(Brazil) Nelson Piquet Jr.	Renault	1:18.505	1:18.393		15
16	14	(France) Sébastien Bourdais	Toro Rosso-Ferrari	1:18.916			18^{3}
17	20	(Germany) Adrian Sutil	Force India-Ferrari	1:19.108			16
18	21	(Italy) Giancarlo Fisichella	Force India-Ferrari	1:19.165			17
19	16	(United Kingdom) Jenson Button	Honda	1:23.565			19
20	15	(Germany) Sebastian Vettel	Toro Rosso-Ferrari	No time^{2}			20

Notes

- ^1 – Mark Webber spun into the wall and damaged his right front suspension during the second part of qualifying, thus he was unable to compete in the third part.
- ^2 – Sebastian Vettel was unable to take part in qualifying due to damaging his car during third practice.
- ^3 – Sébastien Bourdais incurred a five place grid penalty for a gearbox change.

=== Race ===
Pos.	No.	Driver	Constructor	Laps	Time/Retired	Grid	Points
1	4	(Poland) Robert Kubica	BMW Sauber	70	1:36:24.447	2	10
2	3	(Germany) Nick Heidfeld	BMW Sauber	70	+16.495	8	8
3	9	(United Kingdom) David Coulthard	Red Bull-Renault	70	+23.352	13	6
4	12	(Germany) Timo Glock	Toyota	70	+42.627	11	5
5	2	(Brazil) Felipe Massa	Ferrari	70	+43.934	6	4
6	11	(Italy) Jarno Trulli	Toyota	70	+47.775	14	3
7	17	(Brazil) Rubens Barrichello	Honda	70	+53.597	9	2
8	15	(Germany) Sebastian Vettel	Toro Rosso-Ferrari	70	+54.120	PL^{4}	1
9	23	(Finland) Heikki Kovalainen	McLaren-Mercedes	70	+54.433	7	
10	7	(Germany) Nico Rosberg	Williams-Toyota	70	+57.749	5	
11	16	(United Kingdom) Jenson Button	Honda	70	+1:07.540	PL^{4}	
12	10	(Australia) Mark Webber	Red Bull-Renault	70	+1:11.229	10	
13	14	(France) Sébastien Bourdais	Toro Rosso-Ferrari	69	+1 Lap	18	
Ret	21	(Italy) Giancarlo Fisichella	Force India-Ferrari	51	Spun off	17	
Ret	8	(Japan) Kazuki Nakajima	Williams-Toyota	46	Accident	12	
Ret	5	(Spain) Fernando Alonso	Renault	44	Spun off	4	
Ret	6	(Brazil) Nelson Piquet Jr.	Renault	39	Brakes	15	
Ret	1	(Finland) Kimi Räikkönen	Ferrari	19	Collision damage	3	
Ret	22	(United Kingdom) Lewis Hamilton	McLaren-Mercedes	19	Collision	1	
Ret	20	(Germany) Adrian Sutil	Force India-Ferrari	13	Gearbox	16	

Notes

- ^4 – Jenson Button and Sebastian Vettel started from the pitlane.

== Championship standings after the race ==
Drivers' Championship standings
	Pos.	Driver	Points
3	1	(Poland) Robert Kubica	42
1	2	(Brazil) Felipe Massa	38
2	3	(United Kingdom) Lewis Hamilton	38
2	4	(Finland) Kimi Räikkönen	35
	5	(Germany) Nick Heidfeld	28

Constructors' Championship standings
	Pos.	Constructor	Points
	1	(Italy) Ferrari	73
1	2	(Germany) BMW Sauber	70
1	3	(United Kingdom) McLaren-Mercedes	53
1	4	(Austria) Red Bull-Renault	21
1	5	(Japan) Toyota	17

- Note: Only the top five positions are included for both sets of standings.

Previous race: 2008 Monaco Grand Prix	FIA Formula One World Championship; 2008 season	Next race: 2008 French Grand Prix
Previous race: 2007 Canadian Grand Prix	Canadian Grand Prix	Next race: 2010 Canadian Grand Prix
