= Willem Toet =

Australian aerodynamicist

- Born: Willem Hendrik Toet; March 29, 1952 (age 73); Amsterdam, Netherlands
- Citizenship: Australian
- Occupation: Aerodynamicist
- Employer: Sauber Aerodynamics
- Known for: Formula One aerodynamicist
- Title: Senior Sales Manager and Aerodynamics consultant

Willem Hendrik Toet (born 29 March 1952) is a Dutch-born Australian–British Formula One aerodynamicist. He is currently the Senior Sales Manager and Aerodynamics consultant for Sauber Aerodynamics and Alfa Romeo Racing. He was previously the head of aerodynamics for the Sauber F1 team but stepped down in 2015.

== Biography ==
Toet, after graduating from at University of Melbourne and La Trobe University in 1974, joined Ford Australia. In 1977 he started working as a racing engineer in Australian Formula 2 and Australian Formula Ford. In 1982 he moved to Great Britain, where he was the chief mechanic and engineer of sports cars.

In 1985 he joined the team of Toleman (which subsequently became Benetton), where he was responsible for aerodynamics and the wind tunnel. After 1994, he joined the Scuderia Ferrari team as head of the aerodynamics department. In 1999 he moved to British American Racing (then Honda) where he became a senior aerodynamicist and design engineer and worked until 2005. On January 13, 2006, he became head of the aerodynamics department at BMW Sauber.

In 2010 he became the managing director of the RML Group, and in November 2011 he returned to Sauber as the head of aerodynamics. He remained with the team until 2015 when he went into part-retirement and now works as a consultant for Sauber Aerodynamics connecting the F1 and non-F1 aspects of the business.

== Driving career ==
Toet competed extensively in the British Hill Climb Championship between 1998 and 2006, scoring many wins and podiums, driving mainly single-seaters.
