= DAMS =

French auto racing team

(France) DAMS
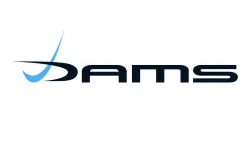
- Founded: 1988
- Founder(s): Jean-Paul Driot; René Arnoux
- Base: Ruaudin, France
- Team principal(s): Yannick Hubert
- Current series: FIA Formula 2 Championship; FIA Formula 3 Championship
- Former series: GP2 Series; GP3 Series; Formula Renault 3.5 Series; Formula 3000; Formula Renault V6 Eurocup; American Le Mans Series; FIA GT Championship; FIA Sportscar Championship; A1 Grand Prix; Formula BMW Europe; GP2 Asia Series; Auto GP; Formula Le Mans; Porsche Supercup; Formula E
- Current drivers: FIA Formula 2 (Sweden) 7. Dino Beganovic (Poland) 8. Roman Bilinski; FIA Formula 3 (Italy) 29. Nicola Lacorte (Thailand) 30. Nandhavud Bhirombhakdi (China) 31. Gerrard Xie
- Teams' Championships: A1 Grand Prix: 2005–06 (as A1 Team France); GP2 Asia Series: 2008–09, 2011; Formula Le Mans Cup: 2009; Auto GP: 2010, 2011; GP2 Series: 2012, 2014; Formula Renault 3.5 Series: 2013, 2014; Formula E: 2014–15, 2015–16, 2016–17; FIA Formula 2 Championship: 2019
- Drivers' Championships: International Formula 3000: 1990: Érik Comas; 1993: Olivier Panis; 1994: Jean-Christophe Boullion; Formula Renault V6 Eurocup: 2003: José María López; GP2 Asia Series: 2008–09: Kamui Kobayashi; 2011: Romain Grosjean; Auto GP: 2010: Romain Grosjean; GP2 Series: 2011: Romain Grosjean; 2012: Davide Valsecchi; 2014: Jolyon Palmer; Formula Renault 3.5 Series: 2013: Kevin Magnussen; 2014: Carlos Sainz, Jr. Formula E: 2015-16: Sebastien Buemi
- Website: https://damslucasoil.com

DAMS (formerly Driot-Arnoux Motorsport, currently Driot Associés Motor Sport; racing as DAMS Lucas Oil for sponsorship reasons) is an auto racing team from France, involved in many areas of motorsport. DAMS was founded in 1988 by Jean-Paul Driot and Formula One driver René Arnoux. In 2022 it was bought by ex-F1 driver Charles Pic. It is headquartered near Le Mans, only 2 km from the Bugatti Circuit.

DAMS has won drivers and teams championships in several international formula racing series, and several drivers who competed for the team have gone on to notable careers.

== History ==
The year after its foundation, DAMS joined the International Formula 3000 Championship. They stayed in F3000 until 2001. DAMS were one of many French teams that were part of the Elf young driver sponsorship program.

Aside from F3000, DAMS planned to join the F1 World Championship in 1996, with a car (the GD-01) developed by Reynard, but lack of funds prevented the team from advancing.

DAMS enter in sports car racing since 1997 until 2002 where it helped the Michel Vaillant movie, preparing and racing cars in the 24 Hours of Le Mans.

In August 2019, founder Jean-Paul Driot died, aged 68. His two sons, Olivier and Gregory Driot, took over as co-team principals, until former Formula 1 driver Charles Pic bought the team in February 2022.

=== Formula 3000/GP2/FIA Formula 2 ===
Right from its inception, the French team entered the FIA International Formula 3000 Championship, which they won in 1990 with Érik Comas, 1992 with Olivier Panis and 1994 with Jean-Christophe Boullion.

In 13 years, 1989 to 2001, DAMS won 4 team titles, 3 drivers titles, 21 wins, 19 pole positions and 19 fastest laps, making DAMS one of the most successful Formula 3000 teams with Super Nova Racing and Arden International.

The team competed in the GP2 Series since its beginning in 2005, winning races with drivers José María López and Nicolas Lapierre.

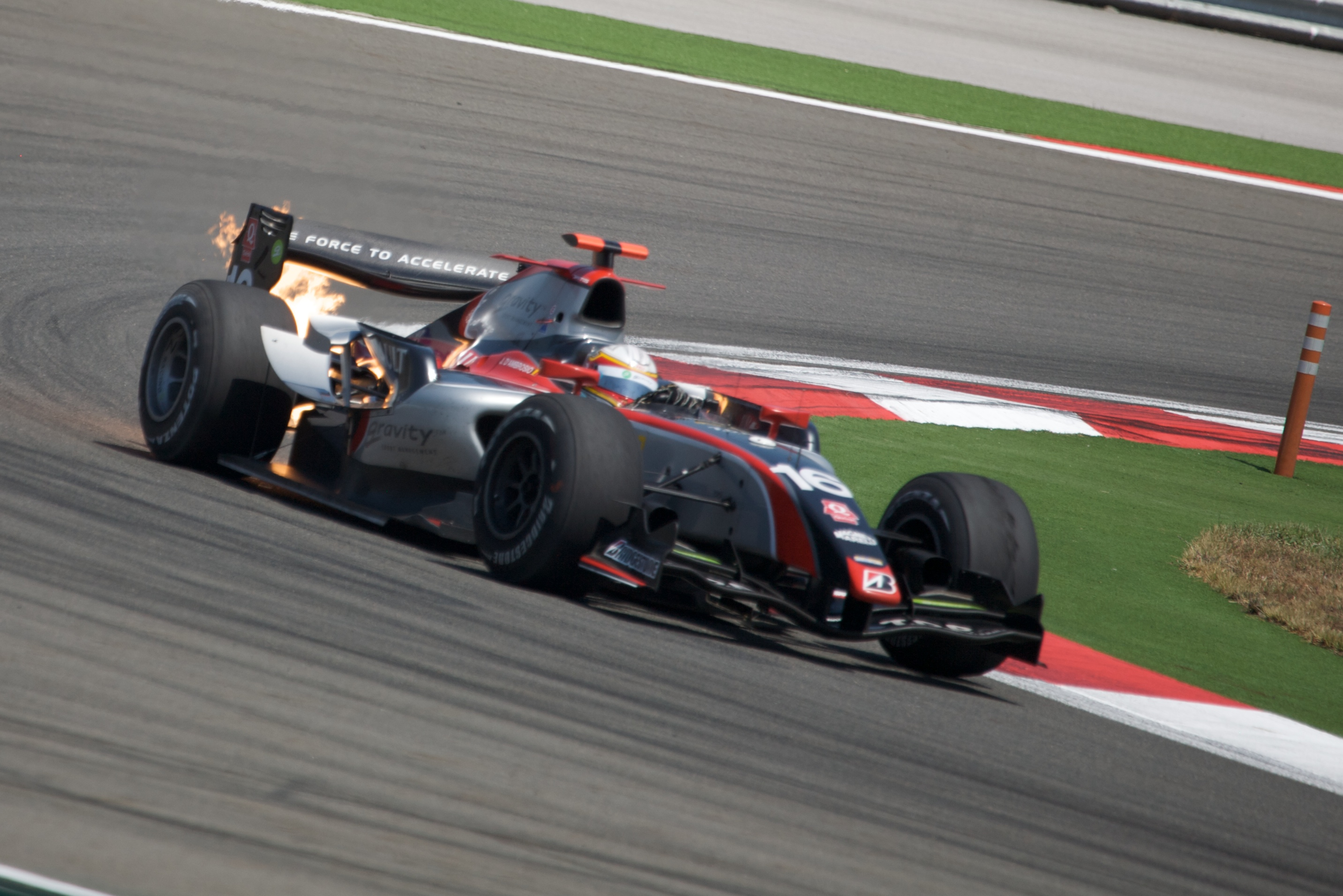
Jérôme d'Ambrosio driving for DAMS at the 2009 Istanbul Park GP2 Series round.

DAMS was associated with the Toyota Drivers Program (TDP) from 2006 to 2009, and ran their drivers in the GP2 Series. In 2006, it was Franck Perera and then Kazuki Nakajima in 2007, who finished 5th in the GP2 championship and raced in the last Formula One Grand Prix of the season with Williams. Following this he won a full-time race seat with the team for 2008 and was retained for the 2009 season. In 2008, TDP driver Kamui Kobayashi replaced Nakajima at DAMS GP2 and became the Toyota Racing test driver. Kobayashi stayed on in 2009, and was partnered by Jérôme d'Ambrosio for these two years. Neither driver was able to put together a consistent run of form in the main GP2 Series championships, but Kobayashi did win the 2008–09 Asian championship with the team.

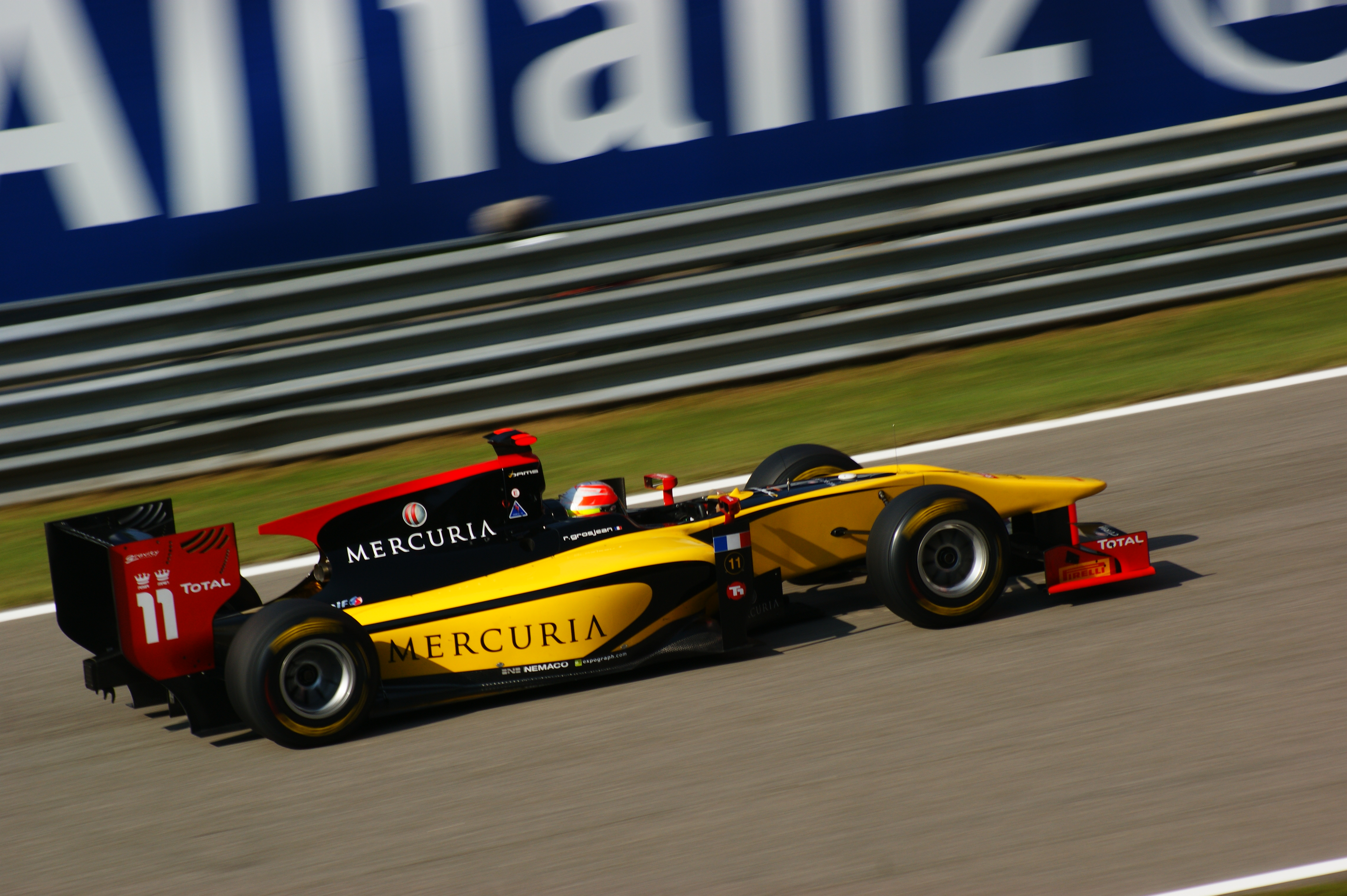
Romain Grosjean won the GP2 championship in 2011.

D'Ambrosio remained with the team for 2010, and was paired with Ho-Pin Tung, who replaced the Sauber-bound Kobayashi. As part of an agreement with the Renault Formula One team, both were nominated as Renault F1 test drivers, and the DAMS GP2 cars were liveried in an identical yellow-and-black scheme to the Renault R30 chassis. D'Ambrosio won the sprint race at Monaco, but his form thereafter was disappointing and he was rested for one of the rounds in favour of Romain Grosjean, another driver with Renault F1 links. Grosjean later got the opportunity to move into the team full-time when Tung, yet to score a point after 12 races, sustained a broken vertebra in a racing accident. D'Ambrosio, Grosjean and Tung finished 12th, 14th and 28th respectively in the drivers' championship, whilst DAMS finished sixth position in the teams' championship. Grosjean remained with the team for 2011, with Norwegian rookie Pål Varhaug replacing D'Ambrosio, who graduated to F1 with the Virgin Racing team. DAMS retained its links with Renault, although these were somewhat diluted by the F1 team's new sponsorship deal with Lotus Cars, which also backed the rival ART team in GP2. Grosjean dominated the year, winning both the Asian and main series championships. DAMS also won the Asian teams' title, but Varhaug's failure to score points in the main series saw the team beaten to the championship by Addax.

For the 2012 season, Grosjean moved to the Lotus (formerly Renault) Formula One team, and Varhaug switched to the Auto GP World Series; they were replaced by series veteran Davide Valsecchi and reigning British F3 champion Felipe Nasr. Valsecchi began the season strongly, winning an unprecedented three races in a row in Bahrain, and later prevailed over closest rival Luiz Razia to win the championship, whilst Nasr finished on the podium four times to finish tenth in the championship, the second-highest rookie behind James Calado. Between them, Valsecchi and Nasr scored enough points to win DAMS's first GP2 Teams' Championship, six points ahead of ART, competing under the Lotus GP banner.

The team wrapped up both the 2014 Drivers' and Teams' Championships, with Jolyon Palmer winning the former. DAMS went into the 2015 season with Red Bull Junior Team driver Pierre Gasly and 2014 GP3 champion Alex Lynn as their driver lineup. The team struggled in the Bahrain feature race with Gasly being involved in a fourth lap collision with Arthur Pic, Raffaele Marciello and Norman Nato and Lynn falling down the order after driving into the back of Alexander Rossi and damaging his front wing. Both drivers finished outside the points in the following day's sprint race. The team had an improved weekend in Barcelona, with Lynn taking his first GP2 victory in the sprint race and Gasly joining him on the podium in third.

In 2018, the team fielded Nicholas Latifi and Alexander Albon in the FIA Formula 2 Championship. The team secured third place in the constructors' championship and took 5 wins during the season (4 for Albon and 1 for Latifi). The team's 2018 lineup will race together for the first time in three years in the 2022 Formula One World Championship for the Williams team.

For the 2019 season, the team hired Sérgio Sette Câmara to replace Albon, who was promoted to Formula 1 with Toro Rosso for 2019. They won the Teams' Championship with 418 points, and 6 wins (5 for Latifi, who was promoted to Formula 1 for 2020 to drive for Williams, and 2 for Sette Câmara, who later moved on to Formula E to drive for the GEOX Dragon team.

For the 2020 season, the team hired Sean Gelael and Dan Ticktum to race for them. After a disappointing season, the team slumped to 8th in the Teams' Championship, accumulating a total of 115.5 points, with Ticktum scoring both of their wins (at Spielberg, and at Silverstone.)

For the 2021 season, the team hired two new drivers Roy Nissany and Marcus Armstrong to replace the Carlin-bound Ticktum and the WEC-bound Gelael. Scoring only one win all year (through Armstrong at Jeddah, the team once again finished 8th in the Teams' Championship, with 65 points.

For the 2022 season, the team stayed with Nissany for another season and hired Japanese rookie Ayumu Iwasa. 2022 was seen as an improvement for DAMS, as they finished 6th in the Teams' Championship. They scored a total of 2 wins (both scored by Iwasa), and 161 points (141 for Iwasa, who finished 5th in the Drivers' Championship; and 20 for Nissany, who finished 19th.)

For the 2023 season, the team stuck with Iwasa for his second year in the category, and hired Monegasque rookie Arthur Leclerc from Prema's Formula 3 team.

=== A1 Grand Prix, Formula Renault and Formula E ===
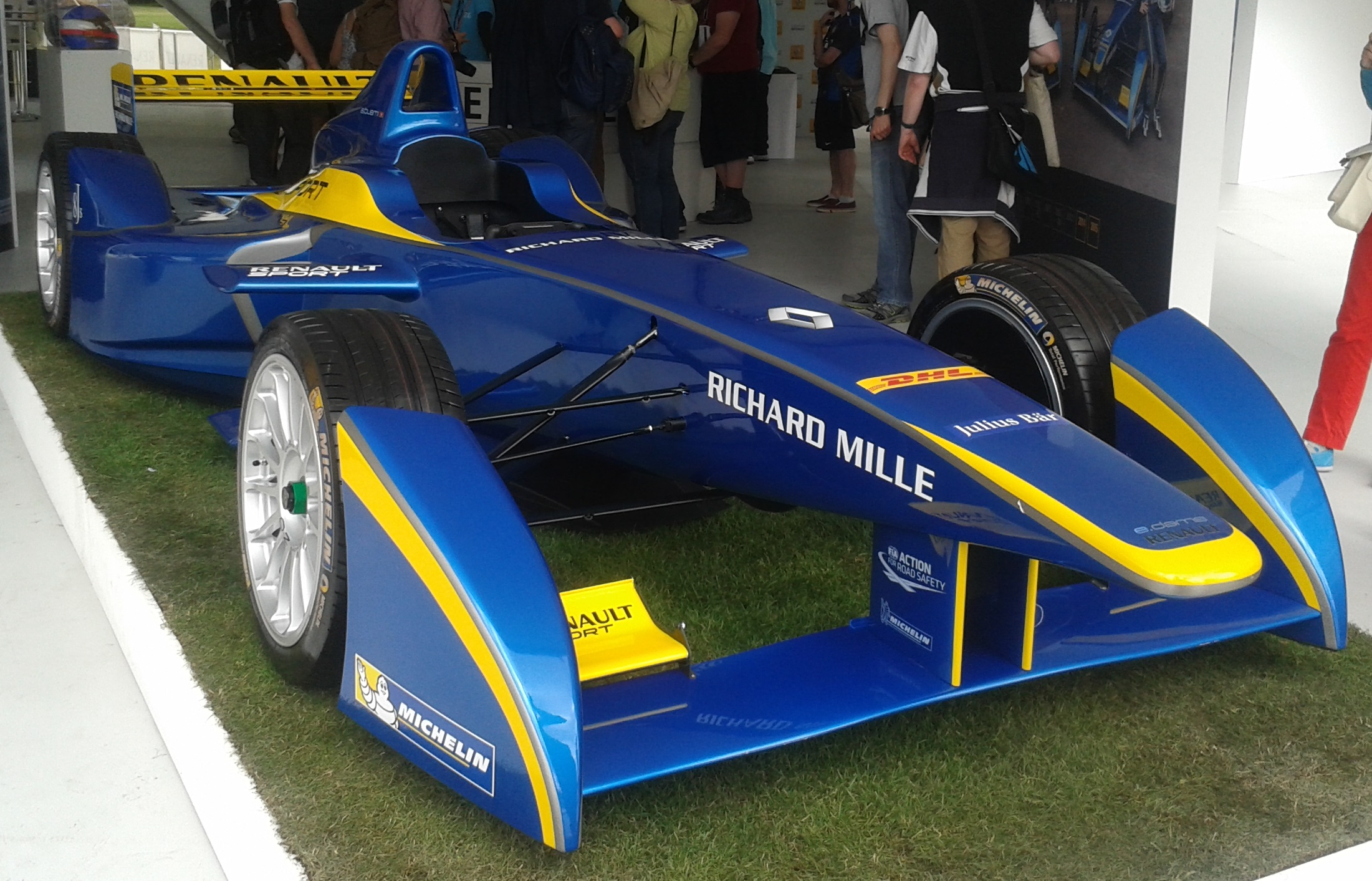
The e.dams Formula E car on show at Battersea Park Street Circuit, June 2015

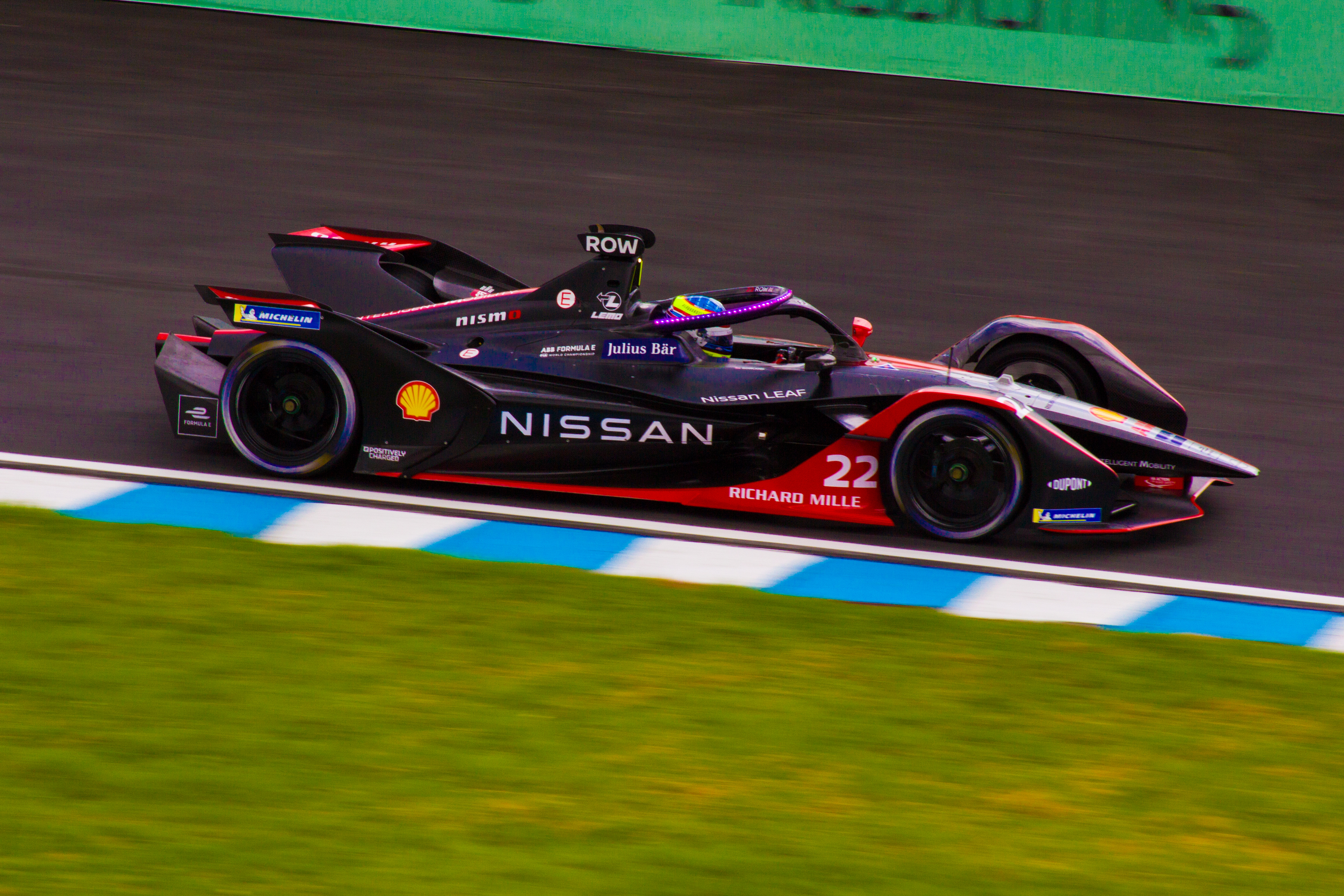
Oliver Rowland qualifying with the Nissan IM03 for the 2021 Puebla ePrix.

In the 2003 and 2004 seasons, DAMS took part in the Formula Renault V6 Eurocup, which they won that same year with Argentinian José María López. In 2005 the team entered the World Series by Renault. Since 2005, DAMS joined the GP2 Series but also the A1 Grand Prix where it serviced three teams.

Driot is one of the owners of the A1 Team France. DAMS also managed A1 Team Switzerland, A1 Team Mexico and later A1 Team South Africa in the A1 Grand Prix championships. With A1 Team France, DAMS was the first winner of the series winning 13 of the 22 races including in the 2005–06 season.

For the 2007–08 season, A1 Team France and South Africa collaborated closely to finalize the car like it was previously done with A1 Team Switzerland.

The team joined the new Formula E championship in 2014 under the name e.dams, with collaboration from Alain Prost. Sébastien Buemi was runner-up in the inaugural season and champion in 2015–16, having claimed 8 wins and 13 podiums in 23 races. Nicolas Prost finished sixth and third respectively, claiming three wins. In the 2016–17 season, the team clinched their third straight constructors' title but Buemi lost the title to Lucas di Grassi at the final round in Montreal. Buemi also had to miss the New York City rounds due to commitments in the World Endurance Championship and was replaced by Pierre Gasly.

The following season saw the team's final season with Renault in Formula E fail to see any of their drivers win a single race in the championship. Their highest finish was 2nd for Buemi in Marrakesh. The team could only finish fifth in the constructors' championship. At the end of the season, Nicolas Prost left the team.

For the 2018–19 season, the team switched to Nissan and originally hired Alexander Albon to partner Buemi, however on 26 November 2018 Albon was released from his contract with the team to instead drive in the 2019 Formula One season with the Toro Rosso team. Four days later, the team signed Oliver Rowland, who raced for the team in the 2017 FIA Formula 2 Championship. As is traditional with Nissan factory teams, their car numbers are 22 and 23, since the numbers 2 and 3 are pronounced "ni" and "san" in Japanese.

Under the Nissan banner, the team couldn't win any championship. Their first powertrain named Nissan IM01 proved to be controversial as e.dams were the only team to use a dual-motor setup, having scored six poles with this powertrain. This was eventually outlawed in technical regulations for the 2019–20 season. Despite being forced by rules to significantly change their powertrain design, Nissan e.dams improved in the COVID-impaced 2019–20 season, ending up second in Teams' Championship instead of fourth.

After two disappointing seasons in a row with a 10th place in the 2020–21 season and a 9th position in the 2021–22 season, Nismo decided to part ways with DAMS and operate the team on their own.

=== Sports car racing ===
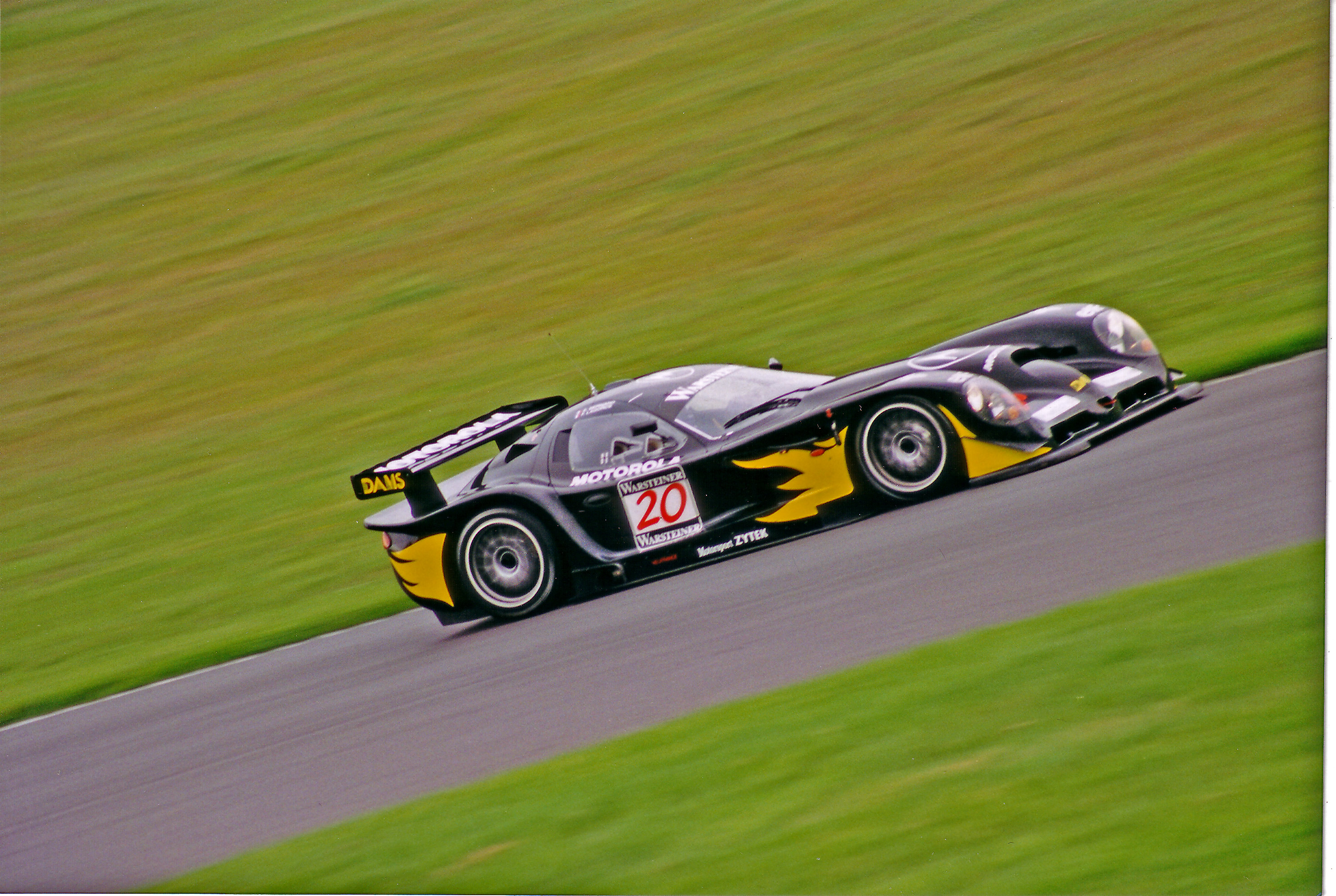
A Panoz Esperante GTR-1 campaigned by DAMS in the 1997 FIA GT Championship season

Starting from 1997, Driot's team diversified into sports car racing, entering the FIA GT Championship in partnership with Panoz. Splitting up in the following year, DAMS ran a Lola B98/10 with a red engine in the SportsRacing World Cup, winning four races, as well as participating in the American Le Mans Series and the 24 Hours of Le Mans.

In 2000 and 2001, DAMS associated themselves with General Motors, preparing the works Cadillac Northstar LMP prototypes for the American Le Mans Series, FIA Sportscar Championship and the 24 Hours of Le Mans, but failed to get any competitive results.

DAMS (running the Bob Berridge Racing Lola) helped the Michel Vaillant movie crew in the 2002, 24 Hours of Le Mans entering with a Lola B98/10-Judd as Vaillante and a Panoz LMP-1 Roadster-S-Élan as Leader.

They then switched their effort to an FIA GT return. In 2003, they tried entering two Nissan 350Z, but once again funds prevented the French team from developing the Japanese car. In 2004, they teamed with Lamborghini and entered two Murciélago R-GT cars in the final rounds of the FIA GT Championship.

== Notable drivers ==
Several drivers have enjoyed success during and after their time with DAMS, including Formula One Grand Prix winners Olivier Panis and Pierre Gasly, 24 Hours of Le Mans winners Allan McNish, Sébastien Bourdais, Kazuki Nakajima, Sébastien Buemi, Neel Jani, Kamui Kobayashi and José María López, as well as multiple Formula One drivers. Success has also been achieved by former drivers in US open wheel racing: Bourdais winning four consecutive Champ Car World Series title, and Marcus Ericsson winning the 2022 Indianapolis 500.

Drivers who have won titles while driving for DAMS include Sébastien Buemi in Formula E, Érik Comas, Jean-Christophe Boullion and Olivier Panis in Formula 3000, José María López in Formula Renault, Kevin Magnussen and Carlos Sainz, Jr. in the World Series by Renault, and GP2 winners Romain Grosjean, Davide Valsecchi and Jolyon Palmer.

== Current series results ==
=== FIA Formula 2 Championship ===
Year	Chassis	Engine	Tyres	Drivers	Races	Wins	Poles	F. Laps	Podiums	D.C.	Pts	T.C.	Pts
2017	Dallara; GP2/11	Mecachrome; V8108 V8	P	(United Kingdom) Oliver Rowland	22	2	1	1	10	3rd	191	3rd	369
2017	Dallara; GP2/11	Mecachrome; V8108 V8	P	(Canada) Nicholas Latifi	21	1	0	2	9	5th	178	3rd	369
2018	Dallara; F2 2018	Mecachrome; V634T V6 t	P	(Thailand) Alexander Albon	24	4	3	0	8	3rd	212	3rd	303
2018	Dallara; F2 2018	Mecachrome; V634T V6 t	P	(Canada) Nicholas Latifi	24	1	0	3	3	9th	91	3rd	303
2019	Dallara; F2 2018	Mecachrome; V634T V6 t	P	(Brazil) Sérgio Sette Câmara	22	2	2	2	8	4th	204	1st	418
2019	Dallara; F2 2018	Mecachrome; V634T V6 t	P	(Canada) Nicholas Latifi	22	4	0	3	8	2nd	214	1st	418
2020	Dallara; F2 2018	Mecachrome; V634T V6 t	P	(Indonesia) Sean Gelael	14	0	0	0	0	21st	3	8th	115.5
2020	Dallara; F2 2018	Mecachrome; V634T V6 t	P	(Estonia) Jüri Vips	8	0	0	0	1	16th	16	8th	115.5
2020	Dallara; F2 2018	Mecachrome; V634T V6 t	P	(United Kingdom) Dan Ticktum	24	1	0	1	4	11th	96.5	8th	115.5
2021	Dallara; F2 2018	Mecachrome; V634T V6 t	P	(Israel) Roy Nissany	23	0	0	1	1	16th	16	8th	65
2021	Dallara; F2 2018	Mecachrome; V634T V6 t	P	(New Zealand) Marcus Armstrong	23	1	0	0	2	13th	49	8th	65
2022	Dallara; F2 2018	Mecachrome; V634T V6 t	P	(Israel) Roy Nissany	26	0	0	0	0	19th	20	6th	161
2022	Dallara; F2 2018	Mecachrome; V634T V6 t	P	(Italy) Luca Ghiotto	2	0	0	0	0	25th	0	6th	161
2022	Dallara; F2 2018	Mecachrome; V634T V6 t	P	(Japan) Ayumu Iwasa	28	2	2	1	6	5th	141	6th	161
2023	Dallara; F2 2018	Mecachrome; V634T V6 t	P	(Japan) Ayumu Iwasa	26	3	1	3	6	4th	165	4th	214
2023	Dallara; F2 2018	Mecachrome; V634T V6 t	P	(Monaco) Arthur Leclerc	26	0	0	1	1	15th	49	4th	214
2024	Dallara; F2 2024	Mecachrome; V634T V6 t	P	(United States) Jak Crawford	28	1	0	1	6	5th	125	6th	178
2024	Dallara; F2 2024	Mecachrome; V634T V6 t	P	(United States) Juan Manuel Correa	24	0	0	0	1	18th	31	6th	178
2024	Dallara; F2 2024	Mecachrome; V634T V6 t	P	(Sweden) Dino Beganovic	4	0	0	0	1	20th	22	6th	178
2025	Dallara; F2 2024	Mecachrome; V634T V6 t	P	(United States) Jak Crawford	26	4	2	1	8	2nd	175	4th	207
2025	Dallara; F2 2024	Mecachrome; V634T V6 t	P	(India) Kush Maini	27	1	0	2	1	16th	32	4th	207
2026	Dallara; F2 2024	Mecachrome; V634T V6 t	P	(Sweden) Dino Beganovic	25	2	2	1	7	5th	137	5th	173*
2026	Dallara; F2 2024	Mecachrome; V634T V6 t	P	(Poland) Roman Bilinski	24	0	0	1	1	16th	36	5th	173*

* Season still in progress.

==== In detail ====
(key)

Year	Drivers	1	2	3	4	5	6	7	8	9	10	11	12	13	14	15	16	17	18	19	20	21	22	23	24	25	26	27	28	29	T.C.	Points
2017		BHR; FEA	BHR; SPR	CAT; FEA	CAT; SPR	MON; FEA	MON; SPR	BAK; FEA	BAK; SPR	RBR; FEA	RBR; SPR	SIL; FEA	SIL; SPR	HUN; FEA	HUN; SPR	SPA; FEA	SPA; SPR	MNZ; FEA	MNZ; SPR	JER; FEA	JER; SPR	YAS; FEA	YAS; SPR								3rd	369
2017	(United Kingdom) Oliver Rowland	5	3	3	2	1	9	7	Ret	4	3	3	17	1^{P}	2	DSQ	8	Ret	11	2^{F}	3	DSQ	7								3rd	369
2017	(Canada) Nicholas Latifi	11	4	6	3	Ret	13	3	3	2	8	8	1	2^{F}	6	DNS	9	3^{F}	16	4	2	5	3								3rd	369
2018		BHR; FEA	BHR; SPR	BAK; FEA	BAK; SPR	CAT; FEA	CAT; SPR	MON; FEA	MON; SPR	LEC; FEA	LEC; SPR	RBR; FEA	RBR; SPR	SIL; FEA	SIL; SPR	HUN; FEA	HUN; SPR	SPA; FEA	SPA; SPR	MNZ; FEA	MNZ; SPR	SOC; FEA	SOC; SPR	YAS; FEA	YAS; SPR						3rd	303
2018	(Thailand) Alexander Albon	4	13	1^{P}	13	5^{P}	2	Ret^{P}	Ret	Ret	7	5	5	1	7	5	1	5	3	3	Ret	1	3	14	8						3rd	303
2018	(Canada) Nicholas Latifi	11	10	5	3	14^{F}	8	9	8^{F}	7	8	11	8	17	16	Ret	16	8	1^{F}	5	4	2	Ret	Ret	15						3rd	303
2019		BHR; FEA	BHR; SPR	BAK; FEA	BAK; SPR	CAT; FEA	CAT; SPR	MON; FEA	MON; SPR	LEC; FEA	LEC; SPR	RBR; FEA	RBR; SPR	SIL; FEA	SIL; SPR	HUN; FEA	HUN; SPR	SPA; FEA	SPA; SPR	MNZ; FEA	MNZ; SPR	SOC; FEA	SOC; SPR	YAS; FEA	YAS; SPR						1st	418
2019	(Brazil) Sérgio Sette Câmara	3	2	Ret	6	NC	17	3	6	2^{P}	5	5^{F}	1	4^{F}	17	5	3	C	C	5	Ret	5	6	1^{P}	3						1st	418
2019	(Canada) Nicholas Latifi	1	3	4	1	1	6^{F}	12	10	5	6	9	6	2	5	1	7	C	C	13	10	2	4^{F}	7	2^{F}						1st	418
2020		RBR; FEA	RBR; SPR	RBR; FEA	RBR; SPR	HUN; FEA	HUN; SPR	SIL; FEA	SIL; SPR	SIL; FEA	SIL; SPR	CAT; FEA	CAT; SPR	SPA; FEA	SPA; SPR	MNZ; FEA	MNZ; SPR	MUG; FEA	MUG; SPR	SOC; FEA	SOC; SPR	BHR; FEA	BHR; SPR	BHR; FEA	BHR; SPR						8th	115.5
2020	(Indonesia) Sean Gelael	Ret	Ret	10	7	17	12	15	Ret	Ret	DNS	19†	DNS									13	14	19	17						8th	115.5
2020	(Estonia) Jüri Vips													11	11	11	9	7	3	Ret	18										8th	115.5
2020	(United Kingdom) Dan Ticktum	5	3	8	2	9	NC	8	1	15	7	9	10	6	10	7	DSQ	17	17^{F}	10	8	9	12	8	3						8th	115.5
2021		BHR; SP1	BHR; SP2	BHR; FEA	MON; SP1	MON; SP2	MON; FEA	BAK; SP1	BAK; SP2	BAK; FEA	SIL; SP1	SIL; SP2	SIL; FEA	MNZ; SP1	MNZ; SP2	MNZ; FEA	SOC; SP1	SOC; SP2	SOC; FEA	JED; SP1	JED; SP2	JED; FEA	YAS; SP1	YAS; SP2	YAS; FEA						8th	65
2021	(Israel) Roy Nissany	12	15	Ret	3	Ret	9	16	16	16	Ret	12	16	Ret	18	8	16	C	15	13	11	15	14	17^{F}	13						8th	65
2021	(New Zealand) Marcus Armstrong	Ret	10	5	10	Ret	Ret	7	Ret	Ret	9	2	12	11	15	9	11	C	11	1	Ret	8	10	Ret	7						8th	65
2022		BHR; SPR	BHR; FEA	JED; SPR	JED; FEA	IMO; SPR	IMO; FEA	CAT; SPR	CAT; FEA	MON; SPR	MON; FEA	BAK; SPR	BAK; FEA	SIL; SPR	SIL; FEA	RBR; SPR	RBR; FEA	LEC; SPR	LEC; FEA	HUN; SPR	HUN; FEA	SPA; SPR	SPA; FEA	ZAN; SPR	ZAN; FEA	MNZ; SPR	MNZ; FEA	YAS; SPR	YAS; FEA		6th	161
2022	(Israel) Roy Nissany	12	8	9	8	4	Ret	15	10	9	Ret	10	Ret	14	Ret	13	9	16	9	19	18	11	19	15	16			8	10		6th	161
2022	(Italy) Luca Ghiotto																									13	Ret				6th	161
2022	(Japan) Ayumu Iwasa	8	16	6	7	9	5	2	12	19	17†	8	14	2^{F}	12	10	7	6	1	8	3^{P}	9	7	6	3	16	DSQ	13	1^{P}		6th	161
2023		BHR; SPR	BHR; FEA	JED; SPR	JED; FEA	ALB; SPR	ALB; FEA	BAK; SPR	BAK; FEA	MCO; SPR	MCO; FEA	CAT; SPR	CAT; FEA	RBR; SPR	RBR; FEA	SIL; SPR	SIL; FEA	HUN; SPR	HUN; FEA	SPA; SPR	SPA; FEA	ZAN; SPR	ZAN; FEA	MNZ; SPR	MNZ; FEA	YAS; SPR	YAS; FEA				4th	214
2023	(Japan) Ayumu Iwasa	4	8	1	4	13	1^{P}	Ret	11	1	10	8	4	11	2^{F}	21^{F}	5	2^{F}	4	7	Ret	13	13	Ret	2	8	4				4th	214
2023	(Monaco) Arthur Leclerc	12	6	11	8^{F}	4	3	16†	10	14	Ret	9	9	13	Ret	8	9	15	13	9	11	11	14	7	Ret	21	6				4th	214
2024		BHR; SPR	BHR; FEA	JED; SPR	JED; FEA	ALB; SPR	ALB; FEA	IMO; SPR	IMO; FEA	MCO; SPR	MCO; FEA	CAT; SPR	CAT; FEA	RBR; SPR	RBR; FEA	SIL; SPR	SIL; FEA	HUN; SPR	HUN; FEA	SPA; SPR	SPA; FEA	MNZ; SPR	MNZ; FEA	BAK; SPR	BAK; FEA	LUS; SPR	LUS; FEA	YAS; SPR	YAS; FEA		6th	178
2024	(United States) Jak Crawford	2	Ret	5	4	9	10^{F}	14	7	13	Ret	4	1	6	10	6	3	9	17	5	3	6	9	2	8	2	Ret	8	Ret		6th	178
2024	(United States) Juan Manuel Correa	12	Ret	Ret	14	11	14	15	8	12	5	8	3	16	14	12	20	8	16	17	11	17	Ret	15	Ret						6th	178
2024	(Sweden) Dino Beganovic																									10	5	3	7		6th	178
2025		ALB; SPR	ALB; FEA	BHR; SPR	BHR; FEA	JED; SPR	JED; FEA	IMO; SPR	IMO; FEA	MCO; SPR	MCO; FEA	CAT; SPR	CAT; FEA	RBR; SPR	RBR; FEA	SIL; SPR	SIL; FEA	SPA; SPR	SPA; FEA	HUN; SPR	HUN; FEA	MNZ; SPR	MNZ; FEA	BAK; SPR	BAK; FEA	LUS; SPR	LUS; FEA	YAS; SPR	YAS; FEA		4th	207
2025	(United States) Jak Crawford	Ret	C	12	16	Ret	2^{P}	1	6	4	1	4	4	DNS	3	6	1	10	17	3	3	16	11	4	1^{P}	8	11	6	10^{F}		4th	207
2025	(India) Kush Maini	16	C	16^{F}	18	10	10	13	21	1	6	16	7	17^{F}	16	4	16	NC	20	9	11	Ret	12	Ret	20†	Ret	16	16	7		4th	207
2026		ALB; SPR	ALB; FEA	MIA; SPR	MIA; FEA	MTL; SPR	MTL; FEA	MCO; SPR	MCO; FEA	CAT; SPR	CAT; FEA	RBR; SPR	RBR; FEA	SIL; SPR	SIL; FEA	SPA; SPR	SPA; FEA	HUN; SPR	HUN; FEA	MNZ; SPR	MNZ; FEA	MAD; SPR	MAD; FEA	BAK; SPR	BAK; FE1	BAK; FE2	LUS; SPR	LUS; FEA	YAS; SPR	YAS; FEA	5th	173*
2026	(Sweden) Dino Beganovic	20	Ret^{P F}	8	2	6	Ret	5	3	7	6	13	13	6	12	3	Ret	2	6	12	14	10	1^{P}	1	3	7					5th	173*
2026	(Poland) Roman Bilinski	8	12	14	DNS	8	13	2	10	21	10	6	10	7	8	7	Ret	18^{F}	14	Ret	21	11	9	6	7	10					5th	173*

* Season still in progress.

=== FIA Formula 3 Championship ===
Year	Chassis	Engine	Tyres	Drivers	Races	Wins	Poles	F. Laps	Podiums	D.C.	Pts	T.C.	Pts
2025	Dallara; F3 2025	Mecachrome; V634 V6	P	(Italy) Nicola Lacorte	17	0	0	0	0	33rd	0	10th	30
2025	Dallara; F3 2025	Mecachrome; V634 V6	P	(United States) Nikita Johnson	2	0	0	0	0	32nd	0	10th	30
2025	Dallara; F3 2025	Mecachrome; V634 V6	P	(Peru) Matías Zagazeta	19	0	0	0	0	24th	13	10th	30
2025	Dallara; F3 2025	Mecachrome; V634 V6	P	(Singapore) Christian Ho	19	0	0	0	0	22nd	17	10th	30
2026	Dallara; F3 2025	Mecachrome; V634 V6	P	(Italy) Nicola Lacorte	19	1	0	1	1	19th	33	9th	53
2026	Dallara; F3 2025	Mecachrome; V634 V6	P	(Thailand) Nandhavud Bhirombhakdi	18	0	0	0	0	30th	0	9th	53
2026	Dallara; F3 2025	Mecachrome; V634 V6	P	(China) Gerrard Xie	16	1	0	0	2	22nd	20	9th	53

==== In detail ====
(key)

Year	Drivers	1	2	3	4	5	6	7	8	9	10	11	12	13	14	15	16	17	18	19	20	T.C.	Points
2025		ALB; SPR	ALB; FEA	BHR; SPR	BHR; FEA	IMO; SPR	IMO; FEA	MCO; SPR	MCO; FEA	CAT; SPR	CAT; FEA	RBR; SPR	RBR; FEA	SIL; SPR	SIL; FEA	SPA; SPR	SPA; FEA	HUN; SPR	HUN; FEA	MNZ; SPR	MNZ; FEA	10th	30
2025	(Italy) Nicola Lacorte	17	24	Ret	20	15	25	Ret	Ret	19	26†			23	15	16	C	Ret	18	28	22	10th	30
2025	(United States) Nikita Johnson											18	22									10th	30
2025	(Peru) Matías Zagazeta	5	22	17	29	Ret	22	17	15	18	15	17	18	25	24	Ret	C	26	16	4	Ret	10th	30
2025	(Singapore) Christian Ho	15	Ret	8	10	21	21	15	13	11	14	Ret	24	6	5	28	C	20	20	23	13	10th	30
2026		ALB; SPR	ALB; FEA	MCO; SPR	MCO; FEA	CAT; SPR	CAT; FEA	RBR; SPR	RBR; FEA	SIL; SPR	SIL; FEA	SPA; SPR	SPA; FEA	HUN; SPR	HUN; FEA	MNZ; SPR	MNZ; FEA	MAD; SPR	MAD; FE1	MAD; FE2		9th	53
2026	(Italy) Nicola Lacorte	11	25	22	27†	16	Ret	12	9	23	Ret	14	18	7	18	9	1	23	20	20^{F}		9th	53
2026	(Thailand) Nandhavud Bhirombhakdi	29	Ret	12	22	24	25	27	26	25	24	25	DNS	25	19	16	23	27	19	27		9th	53
2026	(China) Gerrard Xie	19	19	1	9	3	15	16	25	29	22	21	21	28	Ret	Ret	Ret					9th	53

== Former series results ==
=== Formula 3000 ===
International Formula 3000 Championship Results
Year	Car	Drivers	Races	Wins	Poles	Fast laps	Points	D.C.	T.C.
1989	Lola T89/50-Mugen	(France) Érik Comas	9	2	2	3	39	**2nd**	**1st**
1989	Lola T89/50-Mugen	(France) Éric Bernard	10	1	3	3	25	**3rd**	**1st**
1990	Lola-Mugen	(France) Érik Comas	11	4	3	2	51	**1st**	**1st**
1990	Lola-Mugen	(United Kingdom) Allan McNish	11	2	1	1	26	4th	**1st**
1991	Lola-Mugen	(France) Laurent Aïello	9	0	1	0	4	15th	8th
1991	Lola-Mugen	(United Kingdom) Allan McNish	8	0	0	0	2	16th	8th
1992	Lola T92/50-Cosworth	(France) Jean-Marc Gounon	10	1	0	0	19	6th	5th
1992	Lola T92/50-Cosworth	(France) Frédéric Gosparini	7	0	0	0	0	NC	5th
1992	Lola T92/50-Cosworth	(France) Jérôme Policand	9	0	0	0	0	NC	5th
1992	Lola T92/50-Cosworth	(France) Éric Hélary	1	0	0	0	0	NC	5th
1993	Reynard 93D-Cosworth	(France) Olivier Panis	9	3	2	2	32	**1st**	**1st**
1993	Reynard 93D-Cosworth	(France) Franck Lagorce	8	2	1	1	21	4th	**1st**
1994	Reynard 94D-Cosworth	(France) Jean-Christophe Boullion	8	3	0	1	36	**1st**	**1st**
1994	Reynard 94D-Cosworth	(France) Guillaume Gomez	8	0	1	0	12	7th	**1st**
1995	Reynard-Cosworth	(Brazil) Tarso Marques	7	1	2	2	15	5th	4th
1995	Reynard-Cosworth	(France) Guillaume Gomez	7	0	1	2	8	8th	4th
1996	Lola T96/50-Zytek Judd	(France) Laurent Rédon	9	0	0	0	7	8th	8th
1996	Lola T96/50-Zytek Judd	(France) Jean-Philippe Belloc	10	0	0	0	0	NC	8th
1997	Lola T96/50-Zytek Judd	(United Kingdom) Jamie Davies	9	1	1	1	22	4th	5th
1997	Lola T96/50-Zytek Judd	(France) Grégoire de Galzain	6	0	0	0	0	NC	5th
1998	Lola T96/50-Zytek Judd	(United Kingdom) Jamie Davies	12	0	0	0	8	10th	9th
1998	Lola T96/50-Zytek Judd	(France) Grégoire de Galzain	9	0	0	0	0	NC	9th
1999	Lola B99/50-Zytek	(France) Franck Montagny	10	0	0	0	6	10th	10th
1999	Lola B99/50-Zytek	(France) David Terrien	6	0	0	0	0	NC	10th
2000	Lola B99/50-Zytek	(France) Franck Montagny	10	0	0	0	5	15th	11th
2000	Lola B99/50-Zytek	(Denmark) Kristian Kolby	6	0	0	0	2	23rd	11th
2001	Lola B99/50-Zytek	(France) Sébastien Bourdais	12	1	1	1	26	4th	4th
2001	Lola B99/50-Zytek	(United States) Derek Hill	12	0	0	0	0	NC	4th

=== FIA GT Championship ===
FIA GT Championship results
Year	Class	Car	Drivers	Races	Wins	Poles	Fast laps	Points	T.C.
1997	GT1	Panoz Esperante GTR-1; Ford (Roush) 6.0L V8	(France) Franck Lagorce (France) Éric Bernard	9	0	0	0	0	NC
1998	GT1	Panoz Esperante GTR-1; Ford (Roush) 6.0L V8	(France) Éric Bernard (Australia) David Brabham (United States) Johnny O'Connell (France) Christophe Tinseau (France) Franck Lagorce	10	0	0	0	17	5th

=== 24 Hours of Le Mans ===
24 Hours of Le Mans results
Year	Entrant	No.	Car	Drivers	Class	Laps	Pos.	Class Pos.
1997	(France) DAMS	52	Panoz Esperante GTR-1-Ford	(France) Éric Bernard (France) Jean-Christophe Boullion (France) Franck Lagorce	LMGT1	149	DNF	DNF
1998	(France) DAMS (United States) Panoz Motorsports	44	Panoz Esperante GTR-1-Ford	(France) Éric Bernard (United States) Johnny O'Connell (France) Christophe Tinseau	LMGT1	236	DNF	DNF
1999	(France) DAMS	25	Lola B98/10-Judd	(France) Franck Montagny (France) David Terrien (France) Christophe Tinseau	LMP	77	DNF	DNF
2000	(France) DAMS	3	Cadillac Northstar LMP	(France) Éric Bernard (France) Emmanuel Collard (France) Franck Montagny	LMP900	300	19th	9th
2000	(France) DAMS	4	Cadillac Northstar LMP	(Belgium) Marc Goossens (Denmark) Kristian Kolby (France) Christophe Tinseau	LMP900	4	DNF	DNF
2001	(France) DAMS	5	Cadillac Northstar LMP	(France) Éric Bernard (France) Emmanuel Collard (Belgium) Marc Goossens	LMP900	56	DNF	DNF
2001	(France) DAMS	6	Cadillac Northstar LMP	(Italy) Max Angelelli (South Africa) Wayne Taylor (France) Christophe Tinseau	LMP900	270	15th	5th
2002	(France) DAMS (Note: Special entries for the filming of the 2003 film Michel Vaillant by Luc Besson.)	10	Lola B98/10-Judd	(France) Emmanuel Clérico (France) Philippe Gache (Belgium) Michel Neugarten	LMP900	150	NC	NC
2002	(France) DAMS	22	Panoz LMP-1 Roadster-S-Élan	(Belgium) Marc Duez (United Kingdom) Perry McCarthy (France) Jérôme Policand	LMP900	98	DNF	DNF

=== American Le Mans Series ===
American Le Mans Series results
Year	Class	Car	Drivers	Races	Wins	Poles	Fast laps	Points	T.C.
1999	LMP	Lola B98/10-Judd	(France) Jean-Marc Gounon (France) Christophe Tinseau (France) Franck Montagny	4	0	0	0	26	14th
2000	LMP	Cadillac Northstar LMP-Cadillac Northstar	(France) Emmanuel Collard (France) Éric Bernard	1	0	0	0	87	7th
2000	LMP	Cadillac Northstar LMP-Cadillac Northstar	(France) Christophe Tinseau (Belgium) Marc Goossens	1	0	0	0	87	7th

=== FIA Sportscar Championship ===
FIA Sportscar Championship results
Year	Class	Car	Drivers	Races	Wins	Poles	Fast laps	Points	T.C.
1999	SR	Lola B98/10-Judd GV4 4.0L V10	(France) Jean-Marc Gounon (France) Éric Bernard (France) Christophe Tinseau	10	3	5	3	80	**3rd**
2000	SR	Cadillac Northstar LMP-Cadillac Northstar	(France) Emmanuel Collard (France) Éric Bernard	3	0	0	0	14	8th
2000	SR	Cadillac Northstar LMP-Cadillac Northstar	(France) Christophe Tinseau (Belgium) Marc Goossens	3	0	0	0	14	8th

=== Formula Renault V6 Eurocup ===
Formula Renault V6 Eurocup results
Year	Car	Drivers	Races	Wins	Poles	Fast laps	Points	D.C.	T.C.
2003	Tatuus-Renault V4Y RS	(Argentina) José María López	18	5	8	7	505	**1st**	2nd
2003	Tatuus-Renault V4Y RS	(Italy) Davide di Benedetto	1	0	0	0	14	9th (Note: Davide di Benedetto drive only the last round for DAMS. He drive also for Guidare Formula this season and is final 9th place take both team results.)	2nd
2003	Tatuus-Renault V4Y RS	(Australia) Christian Murchison	7	0	0	0	69	10th	2nd
2003	Tatuus-Renault V4Y RS	(Belgium) Mike den Tandt	3	0	0	0	62	11th	2nd
2003	Tatuus-Renault V4Y RS	(United Kingdom) Adam Khan	6	0	0	0	4	22nd	2nd
2004	Tatuus-Renault V4Y RS	(Switzerland) Neel Jani	19	4	8		239	4th	3rd
2004	Tatuus-Renault V4Y RS	(France) Bruce Lorgère-Roux	15	0	0		72	14th	3rd
2004	Tatuus-Renault V4Y RS	(Argentina) José María López	4	0	1		2	27th	3rd

=== GP2 Series ===
Year	Car	Drivers	Races	Wins	Poles	F.L.	Pod	Points	D.C.	T.C.
2005	Dallara GP2/05-Mecachrome	(Argentina) José María López	23	1	0	0	3	36	9th	7th
2005	Dallara GP2/05-Mecachrome	(Malaysia) Fairuz Fauzy	23	0	0	0	0	0	24th	7th
2006	Dallara GP2/05-Mecachrome	(France) Franck Perera	21	0	0	0	1	8	17th	12th
2006	Dallara GP2/05-Mecachrome	(Italy) Ferdinando Monfardini	21	0	0	0	0	6	21st	12th
2007	Dallara GP2/05-Mecachrome	(Japan) Kazuki Nakajima	21	0	1	3	5	44	5th	5th
2007	Dallara GP2/05-Mecachrome	(France) Nicolas Lapierre	21	2	1	2	2	23	12th	5th
2008	Dallara GP2/08-Mecachrome	(Belgium) Jérôme d'Ambrosio	20	0	0	0	2	21	11th	8th
2008	Dallara GP2/08-Mecachrome	(Japan) Kamui Kobayashi	20	1	0	2	1	10	16th	8th
2009	Dallara GP2/08-Mecachrome	(Belgium) Jérôme d'Ambrosio	20	0	0	0	3	29	9th	6th
2009	Dallara GP2/08-Mecachrome	(Japan) Kamui Kobayashi	20	0	0	0	1	13	16th	6th
2010	Dallara GP2/08-Mecachrome	(Belgium) Jérôme d'Ambrosio	18	1	1	0	2	21	12th	6th
2010	Dallara GP2/08-Mecachrome	(France) Romain Grosjean	8	0	0	0	2	14	14th	6th
2010	Dallara GP2/08-Mecachrome	(China) Ho-Pin Tung (Note: Tung also competed in 2 races for Racing Engineering in 2010.)	14	0	0	0	0	0	28th	6th
2011	Dallara GP2/11-Mecachrome	(France) Romain Grosjean	18	5	1	6	10	89	**1st**	**2nd**
2011	Dallara GP2/11-Mecachrome	(Norway) Pål Varhaug	18	0	0	0	0	0	23rd	**2nd**
2012	Dallara GP2/11-Mecachrome	(Italy) Davide Valsecchi	24	4	2	5	10	247	**1st**	**1st**
2012	Dallara GP2/11-Mecachrome	(Brazil) Felipe Nasr	24	0	0	0	4	95	10th	**1st**
2013	Dallara GP2/11-Mecachrome	(Sweden) Marcus Ericsson	22	1	2	4	5	121	6th	4th
2013	Dallara GP2/11-Mecachrome	(Monaco) Stéphane Richelmi	22	0	1	0	1	103	8th	4th
2014	Dallara GP2/11-Mecachrome	(United Kingdom) Jolyon Palmer	22	4	3	6	12	276	**1st**	**1st**
2014	Dallara GP2/11-Mecachrome	(Monaco) Stéphane Richelmi	22	1	1	0	2	73	9th	**1st**
2015	Dallara GP2/11-Mecachrome	(France) Pierre Gasly	21	0	3	1	4	110	8th	4th
2015	Dallara GP2/11-Mecachrome	(United Kingdom) Alex Lynn	21	2	2	1	4	110	6th	4th
2016	Dallara GP2/11-Mecachrome	(United Kingdom) Alex Lynn	22	3	0	0	5	124	6th	5th
2016	Dallara GP2/11-Mecachrome	(Canada) Nicholas Latifi	22	0	0	0	1	23	16th	5th

==== In detail ====
(key) (Races in bold indicate pole position) (Races in italics indicate fastest lap)

Year	Chassis Engine Tyres	Drivers	1	2	3	4	5	6	7	8	9	10	11	12	13	14	15	16	17	18	19	20	21	22	23	24	T.C.	Points
2005	GP2/05; Renault; **B**		SMR; FEA	SMR; SPR	CAT; FEA	CAT; SPR	MON; FEA	NÜR; FEA	NÜR; SPR	MAG; FEA	MAG; SPR	SIL; FEA	SIL; SPR	HOC; FEA	HOC; SPR	HUN; FEA	HUN; SPR	IST; FEA	IST; SPR	MNZ; FEA	MNZ; SPR	SPA; FEA	SPA; SPR	BHR; FEA	BHR; SPR		7th	36
2005	GP2/05; Renault; **B**	(Argentina) José María López	2	11	6	1	Ret	13	14	2	Ret	9	Ret	13	10	Ret	Ret	6	7	Ret	Ret	10	8	4	4		7th	36
2005	GP2/05; Renault; **B**	(Malaysia) Fairuz Fauzy	17^{†}	12	12	7	Ret	14	10	14	10	Ret	Ret	Ret	16	Ret	13	Ret	15	14	11	13	15	11	10		7th	36
2006	GP2/05; Renault; **B**		VAL; FEA	VAL; SPR	SMR; FEA	SMR; SPR	NÜR; FEA	NÜR; SPR	CAT; FEA	CAT; SPR	MON; FEA	SIL; FEA	SIL; SPR	MAG; FEA	MAG; SPR	HOC; FEA	HOC; SPR	HUN; FEA	HUN; SPR	IST; FEA	IST; SPR	MNZ; FEA	MNZ; SPR				11th	14
2006	GP2/05; Renault; **B**	(Italy) Ferdinando Monfardini	12	Ret	12	9	Ret	10	6	6	9	Ret	DNS	8	Ret	Ret	12	11	6	18^{†}	12	Ret	Ret				11th	14
2006	GP2/05; Renault; **B**	(France) Franck Perera	11	14	Ret	14	Ret	15	13	Ret	2	Ret	10	Ret	12	14	11	9	Ret	12	8	15^{†}	15^{†}				11th	14
2007	GP2/05; Renault; **B**		BHR; FEA	BHR; SPR	CAT; FEA	CAT; SPR	MON; FEA	MAG; FEA	MAG; SPR	SIL; FEA	SIL; SPR	NÜR; FEA	NÜR; SPR	HUN; FEA	HUN; SPR	IST; FEA	IST; SPR	MNZ; FEA	MNZ; SPR	SPA; FEA	SPA; SPR	VAL; FEA	VAL; SPR				5th	67
2007	GP2/05; Renault; **B**	(Japan) Kazuki Nakajima	17	6	15	7	10	17	6	3	3	3	3	2	Ret	6	Ret	DSQ	18	Ret	9	**3**	7				5th	67
2007	GP2/05; Renault; **B**	(France) Nicolas Lapierre	7	1	Ret	DNS	Ret	8	Ret	Ret	DNS	9	Ret	Ret	14	15	Ret	10	17^{†}	**1**	21	Ret	21				5th	67
2008	GP2/08; Renault; **B**		CAT; FEA	CAT; SPR	IST; FEA	IST; SPR	MON; FEA	MON; FEA	MAG; FEA	MAG; SPR	SIL; FEA	SIL; SPR	HOC; FEA	HOC; SPR	HUN; FEA	HUN; SPR	VAL; FEA	VAL; SPR	SPA; FEA	SPA; SPR	MNZ; FEA	MNZ; SPR					8th	31
2008	GP2/08; Renault; **B**	(Belgium) Jérôme d'Ambrosio	Ret	15	Ret	Ret	9	7	6	Ret	9	12	Ret	10	9	Ret	5	2	8	2	7	6					8th	31
2008	GP2/08; Renault; **B**	(Japan) Kamui Kobayashi	8	1	Ret	9	Ret	Ret	Ret	9	Ret	7	Ret	18	11	8	Ret	6	9	14	Ret	13					8th	31
2009	GP2/08; Renault; **B**		CAT; FEA	CAT; SPR	MON; FEA	MON; FEA	IST; FEA	IST; SPR	SIL; FEA	SIL; SPR	NÜR; FEA	NÜR; SPR	HUN; FEA	HUN; SPR	VAL; FEA	VAL; SPR	SPA; FEA	SPA; SPR	MNZ; FEA	MNZ; SPR	ALG; FEA	ALG; SPR					6th	42
2009	GP2/08; Renault; **B**	(Belgium) Jérôme d'Ambrosio	3	3	6	2	Ret	15	19	12	10	7	16	Ret	9	4	Ret	Ret	4	4	Ret	10					6th	42
2009	GP2/08; Renault; **B**	(Japan) Kamui Kobayashi	8	5	Ret	12	Ret	NC	Ret	17	9	3	13	8	8	11	7	11	17	17^{†}	6	19					6th	42
2010	GP2/08; Renault; **B**		CAT; FEA	CAT; SPR	MON; FEA	MON; SPR	IST; FEA	IST; SPR	VAL; FEA	VAL; SPR	SIL; FEA	SIL; SPR	HOC; FEA	HOC; SPR	HUN; FEA	HUN; SPR	SPA; FEA	SPA; SPR	MNZ; FEA	MNZ; SPR	YMC; FEA	YMC; SPR					6th	35
2010	GP2/08; Renault; **B**	(Belgium) Jérôme d'Ambrosio	Ret	13	8	1	10	8	Ret	8	11	11			6	Ret	**Ret**	Ret	5	2	14	8					6th	35
2010	GP2/08; Renault; **B**	(France) Romain Grosjean											20	19^{†}			3	6	13	17^{†}	6	3					6th	35
2010	GP2/08; Renault; **B**	(China) Ho-Pin Tung	13	10	Ret	Ret	11	9	Ret	13	Ret	15	Ret	14	Ret	DNS											6th	35
2011	GP2/11; Mecachrome; **P**		IST; FEA	IST; SPR	CAT; FEA	CAT; SPR	MON; FEA	MON; SPR	VAL; FEA	VAL; SPR	SIL; FEA	SIL; SPR	NÜR; FEA	NÜR; SPR	HUN; FEA	HUN; SPR	SPA; FEA	SPA; SPR	MNZ; FEA	MNZ; SPR							2nd	89
2011	GP2/11; Mecachrome; **P**	(France) Romain Grosjean	**1**	10	DSQ	9	4	3	1	Ret	4	1	3	1	1	3	3	4	3	21							2nd	89
2011	GP2/11; Mecachrome; **P**	(Norway) Pål Varhaug	18	21	15	8	Ret	21	13	10	16	23	Ret	17	13	Ret	13	18	11	10							2nd	89
2012	GP2/11; Mecachrome; **P**		SEP; FEA	SEP; SPR	BHR1; FEA	BHR1; SPR	BHR2; FEA	BHR2; SPR	CAT; FEA	CAT; SPR	MON; FEA	MON; SPR	VAL; FEA	VAL; SPR	SIL; FEA	SIL; SPR	HOC; FEA	HOC; SPR	HUN; FEA	HUN; SPR	SPA; FEA	SPA; SPR	MNZ; FEA	MNZ; SPR	MRN; FEA	MRN; SPR	1st	342
2012	GP2/11; Mecachrome; **P**	(Italy) Davide Valsecchi	**2**	Ret	**1**	1	1	3	4	3	4	Ret	18	10	7	2	13	7	2	4	3	Ret	6	1	4	5	1st	342
2012	GP2/11; Mecachrome; **P**	(Brazil) Felipe Nasr	6	3	Ret	6	11	5	11	9	17	Ret	Ret	14	6	3	4	3	25^{†}	8	8	2	Ret	21	6	7	1st	342
2013	GP2/11; Mecachrome; **P**		SEP; FEA	SEP; SPR	BHR; FEA	BHR; SPR	CAT; FEA	CAT; SPR	MON; FEA	MON; SPR	SIL; FEA	SIL; SPR	NÜR; FEA	NÜR; SPR	HUN; FEA	HUN; SPR	SPA; FEA	SPA; SPR	MNZ; FEA	MNZ; SPR	MRN; FEA	MRN; SPR	YMC; FEA	YMC; SPR			4th	224
2013	GP2/11; Mecachrome; **P**	(Sweden) Marcus Ericsson	Ret	13	13	Ret	**Ret**	20	Ret	18	**11**	8	1	13	2	4	2	15	Ret	23	7	2	3	6			4th	224
2013	GP2/11; Mecachrome; **P**	(Monaco) Stéphane Richelmi	8	4	Ret	13	15	15	9	8	2	19	**5**	Ret	5	9	7	4	4	25	4	4	Ret	20			4th	224
2014	GP2/11; Mecachrome; **P**		BHR; FEA	BHR; SPR	CAT; FEA	CAT; SPR	MON; FEA	MON; SPR	RBR; FEA	RBR; SPR	SIL; FEA	SIL; SPR	HOC; FEA	HOC; SPR	HUN; FEA	HUN; SPR	SPA; FEA	SPA; SPR	MNZ; FEA	MNZ; SPR	SOC; FEA	SOC; SPR	YMC; FEA	YMC; SPR			1st	349
2014	GP2/11; Mecachrome; **P**	(United Kingdom) Jolyon Palmer	**3**	1	2	2	**1**	7	5	6	2	4	**3**	6	4	2	6	3	8	1	1	10	2	Ret			1st	349
2014	GP2/11; Mecachrome; **P**	(Monaco) Stéphane Richelmi	19	5	**10**	7	8	1	14	10	8	6	10	Ret	Ret	11	21	12	4	3	22	18	5	9			1st	349
2015	GP2/11; Mecachrome; **P**		BHR; FEA	BHR; SPR	CAT; FEA	CAT; SPR	MON; FEA	MON; SPR	RBR; FEA	RBR; SPR	SIL; FEA	SIL; SPR	HUN; FEA	HUN; SPR	SPA; FEA	SPA; SPR	MNZ; FEA	MNZ; SPR	SOC; FEA	SOC; SPR	BHR; FEA	BHR; SPR	YMC; FEA	YMC; SPR			3rd	220
2015	GP2/11; Mecachrome; **P**	(France) Pierre Gasly	Ret	22	7	3	14	10	13	6	4	3	2	8	19	Ret	**Ret**	12	2	5	**6**	7	**5**	C			3rd	220
2015	GP2/11; Mecachrome; **P**	(United Kingdom) Alex Lynn	19	15	5	1	13	11	3	20	5	6	**1**	9	11	8	Ret	10	**Ret**	10	8	3	8	C			3rd	220
2016	GP2/11; Mecachrome; **P**		CAT; FEA	CAT; SPR	MON; FEA	MON; SPR	BAK; FEA	BAK; SPR	RBR; FEA	RBR; SPR	SIL; FEA	SIL; SPR	HUN; FEA	HUN; SPR	HOC; FEA	HOC; SPR	SPA; FEA	SPA; SPR	MNZ; FEA	MNZ; SPR	SEP; FEA	SEP; SPR	YMC; FEA	YMC; SPR			5th	147
2016	GP2/11; Mecachrome; **P**	(United Kingdom) Alex Lynn	6	1	4	5	Ret	9	11	3	16	14	12	Ret	7	1	3	10	12	5	4	12	8	1			5th	147
2016	GP2/11; Mecachrome; **P**	(Canada) Nicholas Latifi	2	7	Ret	Ret	Ret	13	10	Ret	11	10	16	12	14	17	13	9	16	15	14	10	9	12			5th	147

=== GP2 Final ===
(key) (Races in bold indicate pole position) (Races in italics indicate fastest lap)

Year	Chassis Engine Tyres	Drivers	1	2	T.C.	Points
2011	GP2/11; Mecachrome; **P**		YMC; FEA	YMC; SPR	10th	0
2011	GP2/11; Mecachrome; **P**	(Indonesia) Rio Haryanto	12	24	10th	0
2011	GP2/11; Mecachrome; **P**	(Netherlands) Nigel Melker	15	20	10th	0

=== GP2 Asia Series ===
(key) (Races in bold indicate pole position) (Races in italics indicate fastest lap)

Year	Chassis Engine Tyres	Drivers	1	2	3	4	5	6	7	8	9	10	11	12	T.C.	Points
2008	GP2/05; Renault; **B**		DUB1; FEA	DUB1; SPR	SEN; FEA	SEN; SPR	SEP; FEA	SEP; SPR	BHR; FEA	BHR; SPR	DUB2; FEA	DUB2; SPR			4th	34
2008	GP2/05; Renault; **B**	(Belgium) Jérôme d'Ambrosio	11	8	Ret	Ret	3	Ret	11	12	7	3			4th	34
2008	GP2/05; Renault; **B**	(Japan) Kamui Kobayashi	13	Ret	DNS	15	5	1	3	1	20	14			4th	34
2008–09	GP2/05; Renault; **B**		SHI; FEA	SHI; SPR	DUB3; FEA	DUB3; SPR	BHR1; FEA	BHR1; SPR	LSL; FEA	LSL; SPR	SEP; FEA	SEP; SPR	BHR2; FEA	BHR2; SPR	1st	92
2008–09	GP2/05; Renault; **B**	(Belgium) Jérôme d'Ambrosio	9	5	7	C	2	3	5	7	**DNS**	DSQ	3	2	1st	92
2008–09	GP2/05; Renault; **B**	(Japan) Kamui Kobayashi	2	Ret	**1**	C	1	6	4	18	2	7	**4**	5	1st	92
2009–10	GP2/05; Renault; **B**		YMC1; FEA	YMC1; SPR	YMC2; FEA	YMC2; SPR	BHR1; FEA	BHR1; SPR	BHR2; FEA	BHR2; SPR					7th	12
2009–10	GP2/05; Renault; **B**	(Germany) Christian Vietoris	6	1	Ret	14	14	9	Ret	14					7th	12
2009–10	GP2/05; Renault; **B**	(Italy) Edoardo Piscopo	9	7	Ret	16	15	5	8	DNS					7th	12
2011	GP2/11; Mecachrome; **P**		YMC; FEA	YMC; SPR	IMO; FEA	IMO; SPR									1st	25
2011	GP2/11; Mecachrome; **P**	(France) Romain Grosjean	**2**	Ret	**1**	7									1st	25
2011	GP2/11; Mecachrome; **P**	(Norway) Pål Varhaug	Ret	20	13	6									1st	25

=== A1 Grand Prix ===
A1 Grand Prix Results
Year	Car	Team	Races	Wins	Poles	Fast laps	Points	T.C.
2005–06	Lola A1GP-Zytek	A1 Team France	22	13	3	5	172	**1st**
2005–06	Lola A1GP-Zytek	A1 Team Switzerland	22	1	2	0	121	**2nd**
2005–06	Lola A1GP-Zytek	A1 Team Mexico	22	1	1	0	59	10th
2006–07	Lola A1GP-Zytek	A1 Team France	22	0	0	0	67	4th
2006–07	Lola A1GP-Zytek	A1 Team Mexico	22	0	0	1	35	10th
2006–07	Lola A1GP-Zytek	A1 Team South Africa	22	1	1	1	24	14th
2007–08	Lola A1GP-Zytek	A1 Team France	20	1	2	1	118	4th
2007–08	Lola A1GP-Zytek	A1 Team Mexico	20	0	0	1	22	16th
2007–08	Lola A1GP-Zytek	A1 Team South Africa	20	2	4	2	96	5th
2008–09	A1GP-Ferrari	A1 Team France	14	1	0	1	47	5th
2008–09	A1GP-Ferrari	A1 Team South Africa	14	0	0	0	19	14th

=== Formula Renault 3.5 Series ===
World Series by Renault results
Year	Car	Drivers	Races	Wins	Poles	F/laps	Podiums	Points	D.C.	T.C.
2005	Dallara T05-Renault	(Sweden) Alx Danielsson	9	0	0	0	1	32	15th	11th
2005	Dallara T05-Renault	(Venezuela) Pastor Maldonado	8	0	0	0	0	4	25th	11th
2005	Dallara T05-Renault	(Italy) Ferdinando Monfardini	2	0	0	0	0	1	28th	11th
2005	Dallara T05-Renault	(United Kingdom) Alex Lloyd	1	0	0	0	0	0	40th	11th
2005	Dallara T05-Renault	(France) Nicolas Prost	2	0	0	0	0	0	41st	11th
2005	Dallara T05-Renault	(Italy) Raffaele Giammaria	4	0	0	0	0	0	43rd	11th
2012	Dallara T12-Zytek	(France) Arthur Pic	17	1	2	2	2	102	8th	9th
2012	Dallara T12-Zytek	(Brazil) Lucas Foresti	17	0	0	0	0	8	23rd	9th
2013	Dallara T12-Zytek	(Denmark) Kevin Magnussen	17	5	8	4	13	274	**1st**	**1st**
2013	Dallara T12-Zytek	(France) Norman Nato	17	0	1	0	0	33	13th	**1st**
2014	Dallara T12-Zytek	(Spain) Carlos Sainz, Jr.	17	7	7	6	7	227	**1st**	**1st**
2014	Dallara T12-Zytek	(France) Norman Nato	17	2	1	1	2	89	7th	**1st**
2015	Dallara T12-Zytek	(Netherlands) Nyck de Vries	17	1	1	1	6	160	**3rd**	**2nd**
2015	Dallara T12-Zytek	(United Kingdom) Dean Stoneman	17	0	0	0	4	130	6th	**2nd**

=== GP3 Series ===
Year	Car	Drivers	Races	Wins	Poles	F.L.	Pod	Points	D.C.	T.C.
2016	Dallara GP3/16-Mecachrome	(United States) Santino Ferrucci	16	0	0	0	1	34	12th	5th
2016	Dallara GP3/16-Mecachrome	(United Kingdom) Jake Hughes	16	1	1	2	3	69	9th	5th
2016	Dallara GP3/16-Mecachrome	(Switzerland) Kevin Jörg	16	0	0	0	0	13	17th	5th
2017	Dallara GP3/16-Mecachrome	(United Kingdom) Dan Ticktum	5	0	0	1	1	36	11th	6th
2017	Dallara GP3/16-Mecachrome	(Colombia) Tatiana Calderón	15	0	0	0	0	7	18th	6th
2017	Dallara GP3/16-Mecachrome	(United States) Santino Ferrucci	6	0	0	0	0	3	19th	6th
2017	Dallara GP3/16-Mecachrome	(Brazil) Bruno Baptista	15	0	0	0	0	1	20th	6th
2017	Dallara GP3/16-Mecachrome	(France) Matthieu Vaxivière	4	0	0	0	0	0	22nd	6th

==== In detail ====
(key) (Races in bold indicate pole position) (Races in italics indicate fastest lap)

Year	Chassis Engine Tyres	Drivers	1	2	3	4	5	6	7	8	9	10	11	12	13	14	15	16	17	18	T.C.	Points
2016	GP3/16; Mecachrome; **P**		CAT; FEA	CAT; SPR	RBR; FEA	RBR; SPR	SIL; FEA	SIL; SPR	HUN; FEA	HUN; SPR	HOC; FEA	HOC; SPR	SPA; FEA	SPA; SPR	MNZ; FEA	MNZ; SPR	SEP; FEA	SEP; SPR	YMC; FEA	YMC; SPR	4th	152
2016	GP3/16; Mecachrome; **P**	(United States) Santino Ferrucci	15	11	15	10	18	4	15	11	9	4	7	3	19^{†}	11	Ret	Ret	9	15	4th	152
2016	GP3/16; Mecachrome; **P**	(United Kingdom) Jake Hughes	**2**	8	8	6	Ret	17	23	19	8	1	Ret	Ret	3	10	Ret	12	7	1	4th	152
2016	GP3/16; Mecachrome; **P**	(Switzerland) Kevin Jörg	5	7	13	14	15	11	10	9	14	10	11	Ret	NC	12	12	11	4	8	4th	152
2017	GP3/16; Mecachrome; **P**		CAT; FEA	CAT; SPR	RBR; FEA	RBR; SPR	SIL; FEA	SIL; SPR	HUN; FEA	HUN; SPR	SPA; FEA	SPA; SPR	MNZ; FEA	MNZ; SPR	JER; FEA	JER; SPR	YMC; FEA	YMC; SPR			6th	48
2017	GP3/16; Mecachrome; **P**	(United States) Santino Ferrucci	9	8	Ret	13	Ret	9													6th	48
2017	GP3/16; Mecachrome; **P**	(France) Matthieu Vaxivière							12	12	Ret	15									6th	48
2017	GP3/16; Mecachrome; **P**	(United Kingdom) Dan Ticktum											13	C	4	Ret	4	3			6th	48
2017	GP3/16; Mecachrome; **P**	(Colombia) Tatiana Calderón	14	Ret	13	12	14	15	Ret	13	16	13	7	C	13	8	16	15			6th	48
2017	GP3/16; Mecachrome; **P**	(Brazil) Bruno Baptista	16	13	14	Ret	15	14	10	Ret	Ret	16	10	C	16	13	10	9			6th	48

=== Formula E ===
Year	Chassis	Powertrain	Tyres	No.	Drivers	1	2	3	4	5	6	7	8	9	10	11	12	13	14	15	16	Points	T.C.
Team e.dams-Renault
2014–15	Spark SRT01-e	SRT01-e^{1}	M			BEI	PUT	PDE	BUE	MIA	LBH	MCO	BER	MSC	LDN							232	1st
2014–15	Spark SRT01-e	SRT01-e^{1}	M	8	(France) Nicolas Prost	**12†**	**4**	7	2	1	14	6	10	8	7	10						232	1st
2014–15	Spark SRT01-e	SRT01-e^{1}	M	9	(Switzerland) Sébastien Buemi	Ret	3	1	**Ret**	13	4	**1**	2	9	**1**	5						232	1st
Renault e.dams
2015–16	Spark SRT01-e	Renault Z.E.15	M			BEI	PUT	PDE	BUE	MEX	LBH	PAR	BER	LDN								270	1st
2015–16	Spark SRT01-e	Renault Z.E.15	M	8	(France) Nicolas Prost	Ret	10	5	5	3	11	4	4	**1**	1							270	1st
2015–16	Spark SRT01-e	Renault Z.E.15	M	9	(Switzerland) Sébastien Buemi	**1**	**12**	1	2	2	16	3	1	5	**Ret**							270	1st
2016–17	Spark SRT01-e	Renault Z.E.16	M			HKG	MRK	BUE	MEX	MCO	PAR	BER		NYC		MTL						268	1st
2016–17	Spark SRT01-e	Renault Z.E.16	M	8	(France) Nicolas Prost	4	4	4	5	9	5	5	8	8	6	6	Ret					268	1st
2016–17	Spark SRT01-e	Renault Z.E.16	M	9	(Switzerland) Sébastien Buemi	1	1	1	13	**1**	**1**	DSQ	1			DSQ	11					268	1st
2016–17	Spark SRT01-e	Renault Z.E.16	M	9	(France) Pierre Gasly									7	4							268	1st
2017–18	Spark SRT01-e	Renault Z.E. 17	M			HKG		MRK	SCL	MEX	PDE	RME	PAR	BER	ZUR	NYC						133	5th
2017–18	Spark SRT01-e	Renault Z.E. 17	M	8	(France) Nicolas Prost	9	8	13	10	Ret	15	14	16	14	Ret	10	11					133	5th
2017–18	Spark SRT01-e	Renault Z.E. 17	M	9	(Switzerland) Sébastien Buemi	11	10	**2**	3	3	Ret	6	5	4	5	**3**	**4**					133	5th
Nissan e.dams
2018–19	Spark SRT05e	Nissan IM01	M			ADR	MRK	SCL	MEX	HKG	SYX	RME	PAR	MCO	BER	BRN	NYC					190	4th
2018–19	Spark SRT05e	Nissan IM01	M	22	(United Kingdom) Oliver Rowland	7	15	Ret	20†	Ret	**2**	6	**12**	**2**	8	Ret	14	6				190	4th
2018–19	Spark SRT05e	Nissan IM01	M	23	(Switzerland) Sébastien Buemi	6	8	**Ret**	21†	Ret	8	5	15	5	**2**	3	**1**	3				190	4th
2019–20	Spark SRT05e	Nissan IM02	M			DIR		SCL	MEX	MRK	BER		BER		BER							167	2nd
2019–20	Spark SRT05e	Nissan IM02	M	22	(United Kingdom) Oliver Rowland	4	5	17	7	9	14	7	6	5	**1**	Ret						167	2nd
2019–20	Spark SRT05e	Nissan IM02	M	23	(Switzerland) Sébastien Buemi	Ret	12	13	3	4	7	2^{G}	11	3	10	3^{G}						167	2nd
2020–21	Spark SRT05e	Nissan IM02; Nissan IM03	M			DIR		RME		VLC		MCO	PUE		NYC		LDN		BER	BER		97	10th
2020–21	Spark SRT05e	Nissan IM02; Nissan IM03	M	22	(United Kingdom) Oliver Rowland	6	7	12^{G}	16	DSQ	4	6	DSQ	**3**	7	19	DSQ	18	13	2		97	10th
2020–21	Spark SRT05e	Nissan IM02; Nissan IM03	M	23	(Switzerland) Sébastien Buemi	13	Ret	5	10	Ret	11	11	DSQ	14	6^{G}	15	DSQ	13	11	14		97	10th
2021–22	Spark SRT05e	Nissan IM03	M			DIR		MEX	RME		MCO	BER		JAK	MRK	NYC		LON		SEO		36	9th
2021–22	Spark SRT05e	Nissan IM03	M	22	(Germany) Maximilian Günther	12	14	9	Ret	11	17	18	16	14	Ret	12	DSQ	8	15	11	Ret	36	9th
2021–22	Spark SRT05e	Nissan IM03	M	23	(Switzerland) Sébastien Buemi	17	13	8	16	9	8	14	14	11	16	5	13	11	6	Ret	9	36	9th
2022–23: Nissan Formula E Team

Notes

- **^1** – In the inaugural season, all teams were supplied with a spec powertrain by McLaren.
- ^{G} – Driver was fastest in group qualifying stage and was given one championship point.
- † – Driver did not finish the race, but was classified as he completed over 90% of the race distance.

== Timeline ==
Current series
FIA Formula 2 Championship	2017–present
FIA Formula 3 Championship	2025–present
Former series
International Formula 3000	1989–2001
FIA GT Championship	1997–1998, 2004
24 Hours of Le Mans	1997–2002
American Le Mans Series	1999–2000
FIA Sportscar Championship	1999–2000
Formula Renault V6 Eurocup	2003–2004
Formula Renault 3.5 Series	2005, 2012–2015
GP2 Series	2005–2016
A1 Grand Prix	2005–2009
Formula BMW Europe	2008–2010
GP2 Asia Series	2008–2011
Formula Le Mans	2009–2010
Auto GP	2010–2011
Porsche Supercup	2013
GP3 Series	2016–2017
Formula E	2014–2022

== Notes ==
Achievements
Preceded by ART Grand Prix	GP2 Asia Series Teams' Champion; 2008–09	Succeeded by iSport International
Preceded by none	Formula Le Mans Cup Teams' Champion; 2009	Succeeded by none
Preceded by iSport International	GP2 Asia Series Teams' Champion; 2011	Succeeded by none
Preceded by none	Auto GP Teams' Champion; 2010-2011	Succeeded by Super Nova Racing
Preceded by Addax Team	GP2 Series Teams' Champion; 2012	Succeeded by Russian Time
Preceded by Tech 1 Racing	Formula Renault 3.5 Series Teams' Champion; 2013-2014	Succeeded by Fortec Motorsports
Preceded by Russian Time	GP2 Series Teams' Champion; 2014	Succeeded by ART Grand Prix
Preceded by none	Formula E Teams' Champion; 2014-17	Succeeded by Audi Sport Abt Schaeffler
Preceded by Carlin	FIA Formula 2 Teams' Champion; 2019	Succeeded by Prema Racing
