= Dino Beganovic =

Swedish racing driver (born 2004)

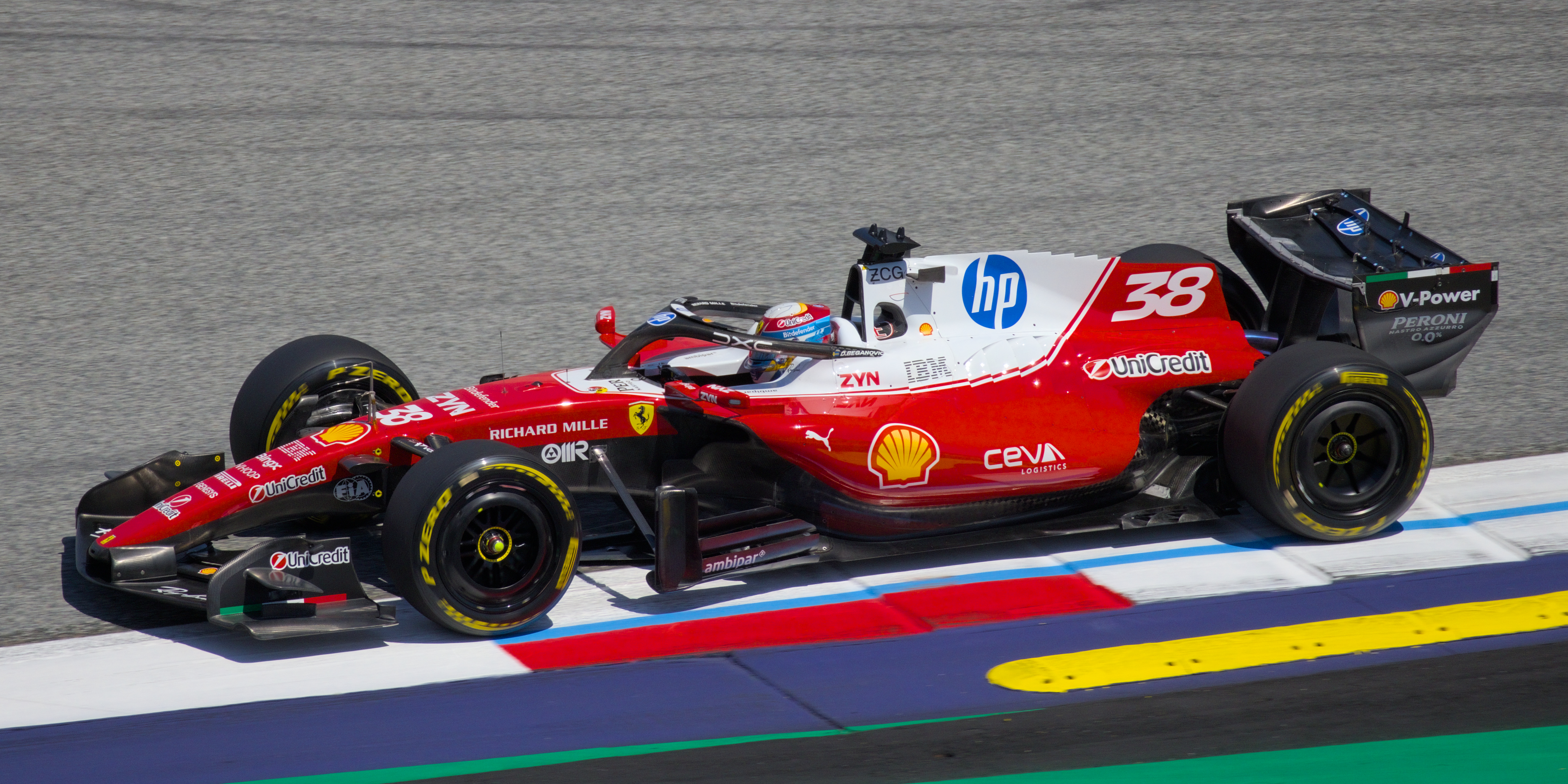
- Beganovic at the 2026 Austrian Grand Prix
- Nationality: (Sweden) Swedish
- Born: 19 January 2004 (age 22) Linköping, Sweden

FIA Formula 2 Championship career
- Debut season: 2024
- Current team: DAMS Lucas Oil
- Car number: 7
- Former teams: Hitech TGR
- Starts: 50
- Wins: 2
- Podiums: 9
- Poles: 3
- Fastest laps: 6
- Best finish: 1st in 2025

Previous series
- 2023–2024; 2023; 2022; 2021–2022; 2020; 2020: FIA Formula 3; FR Middle East; FR Asian; FR European; Italian F4; ADAC F4

Championship titles
- 2022: FR European
- Statistics up to date as of 25 August 2026.

Dino Beganovic (Bosnian: Dino Beganović, pronounced [ˈdino bɛˈɡanovitɕ]; born 19 January 2004) is a Swedish and Bosnian racing driver who drives in the FIA Formula 2 Championship for DAMS Lucas Oil as part of the Ferrari Driver Academy. He previously raced for Hitech TGR; finishing seventh in his rookie season.

Beganovic is a race winner in the FIA Formula 3 Championship, finishing sixth in both seasons he competed in 2023 and 2024 with Prema Racing. He was the 2022 Formula Regional European champion. Beganovic has been a member of the Ferrari Driver Academy since 2020.

== Career ==
=== Karting ===
Beganovic started karting at the age of seven, when his father, a car-mechanic, suggested he try it for the first time. He won multiple national championships, such as the Swedish OK Junior karting category in 2018. In 2019, Beganovic won the OK category in both the Swedish and Italian championships and finished second in WSK Euro Series the same year.

=== Formula 4 ===
In 2020, Beganovic made his single-seater debut, competing in the Italian F4 Championship with Prema Powerteam. There, he began with a podium during the Misano opener, before securing a first pole position at the next round at Imola. He returned to the podium in Mugello, scoring a double podium. He took his maiden single-seater win during the second Imola round, as he led every lap from pole position in a weekend which included a complete podium sweep. With the aforementioned win, six podiums and 179 points, Beganovic placed third behind Francesco Pizzi and championship winner Gabriele Minì in the overall standings. He also participated in select rounds of the ADAC Formula 4 with Prema, scoring twelve points across two weekends.

=== Formula Regional European Championship ===
==== 2021 ====
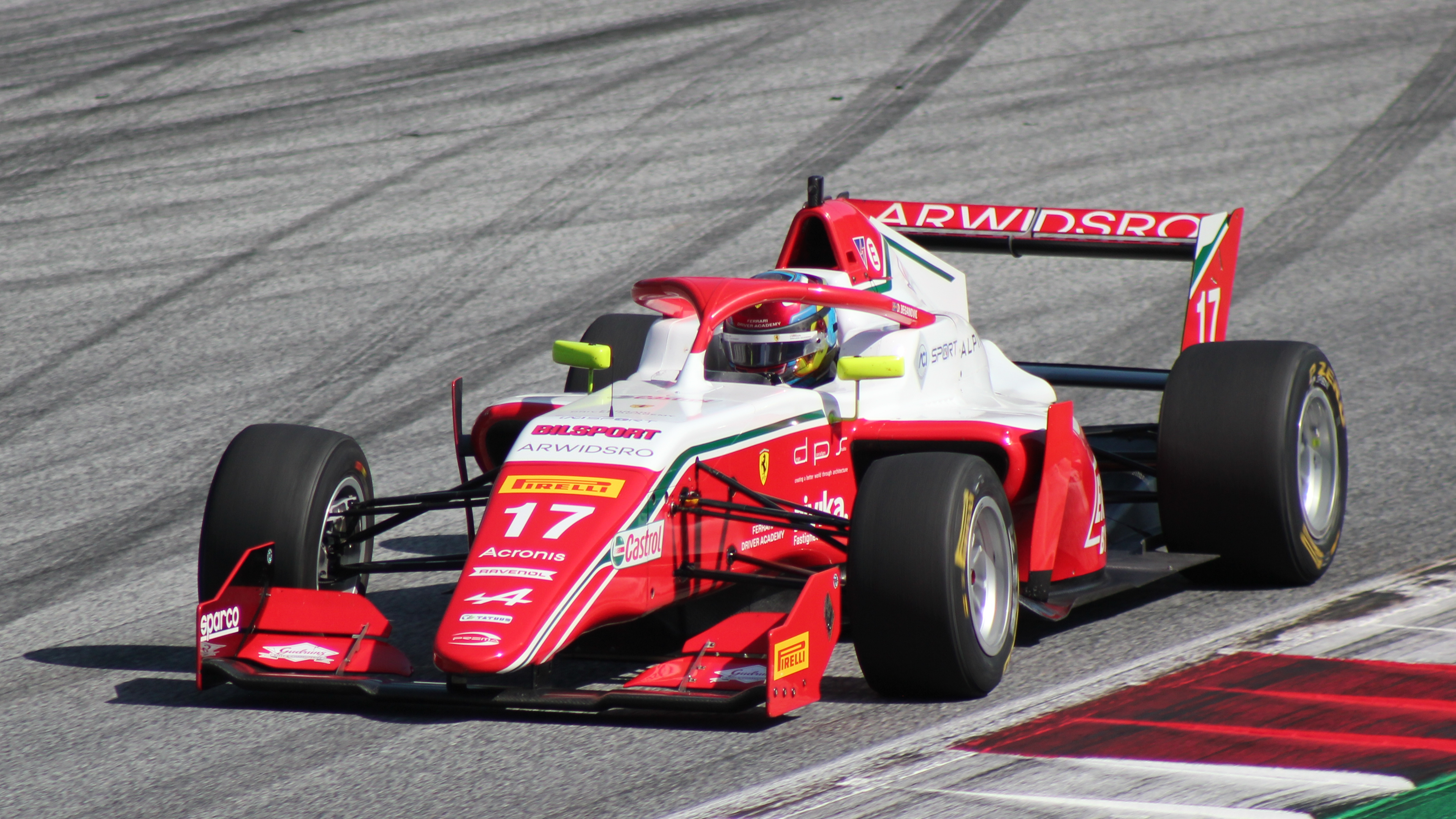
Beganovic racing in the 2021 Formula Regional European Championship at the Red Bull Ring.

Beganovic made his Formula Three debut in 2021, competing in both the F3 Asian Championship and the Formula Regional European Championship with Prema. He began his former season with an impressive double second place in Dubai, before racking up two more podiums in the remaining two rounds that he competed in, placing seventh in the overall standings with five rookie wins.

In his main campaign, Beganovic experienced a tough first half of the season, only managing to score twelve points with a best finish of eighth twice. However, he impressed with a fourth place and the rookie win when the second half of the season began in Spa-Francorchamps, before securing a first podium in Valencia. Beganovic took his first pole position for the final race of the season in Monza, but he retired after being involved in a collision with teammate David Vidales while fighting for the lead. He finished the season thirteenth in the standings, scoring two rookie wins, one podium and 53 points.

==== 2022 ====
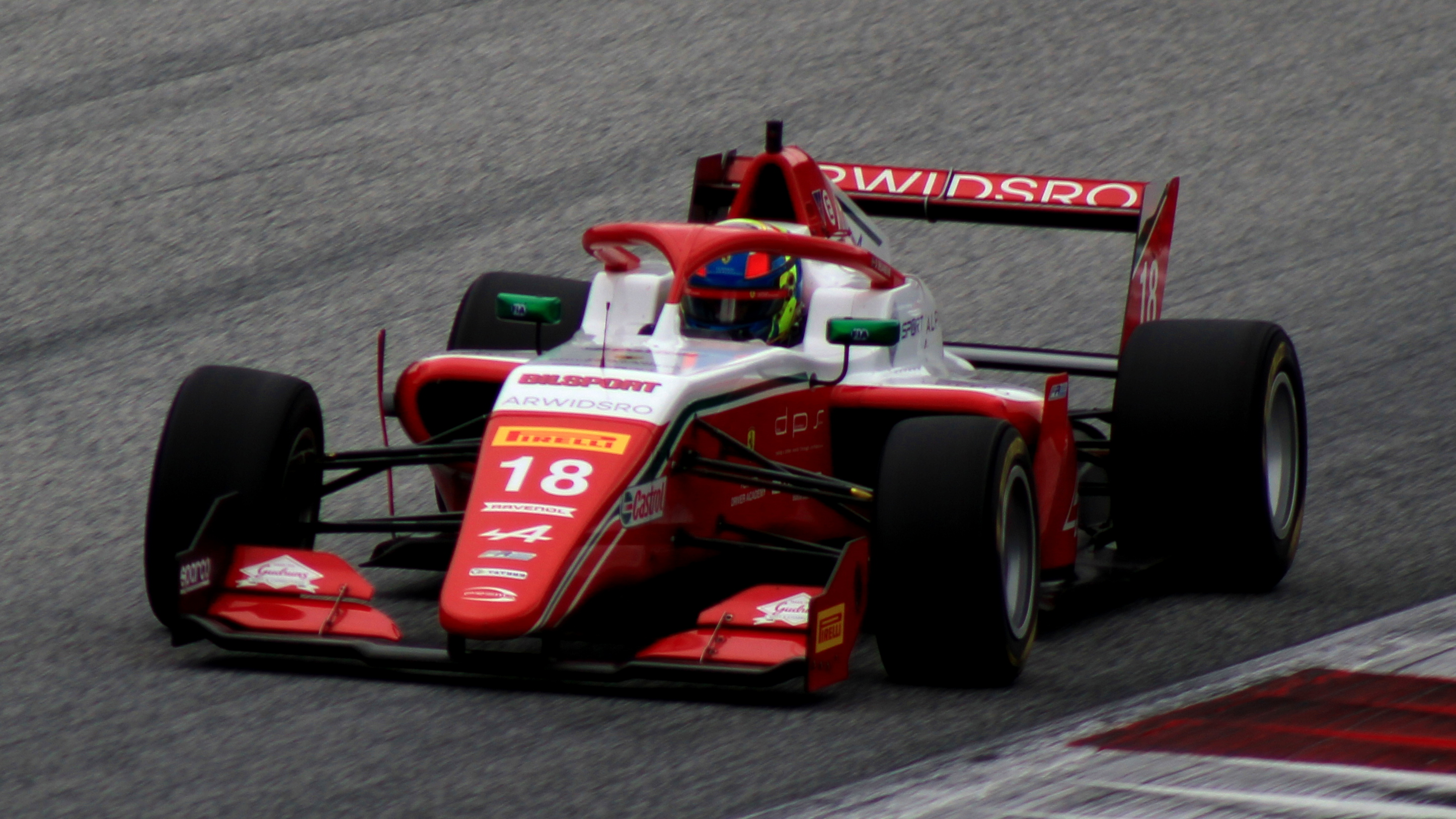
Beganovic racing in the 2022 Formula Regional European Championship at the Red Bull Ring.

During the 2022 pre-season, Beganovic took part in the Formula Regional Asian Championship with Mumbai Falcons. After technical issues blighted his progress during the first round, Beganovic bounced back with a second place podium for the first Dubai round. His only win came during the second Dubai round, in a weekend where he also claimed a third place. Despite a non-scoring round 4, Beganovic ended his campaign with a double podium during the second Yas Marina round, allowing to finish fifth in the standings with one win, five podiums and 130 points.

Beganovic remained in the Formula Regional European Championship with Prema Powerteam. He began the season in Monza, taking his first FRECA win from pole before following it up with second the next day. He won for a second time the next time out in Imola after original winner Gabriele Minì was penalised. Beganovic secured a third victory in Monaco and a double Paul Ricard rostrum which further extended his championship lead to 63 points. Although his podium streak ended the next round in Zandvoort, he managed to rescue a third place during the second race. Beganovic was forced to cope with his first non-podium round at the Hungaroring, but returned with a final win of the year in Spa-Francorchamps. After another double podium finish at the Red Bull Ring, Beganovic clinched the title by finishing fourth in Mugello with a race to spare. He had achieved four wins, thirteen podiums and 300 points to win the championship.

==== 2023 ====
At the start of 2023 before his main F3 campaign, Beganovic returned to the newly rebranded Formula Regional Middle East Championship with Mumbai Falcons, taking part in the first two rounds. He won the first race of the season in Dubai after an intense fight with Gabriele Minì for the lead. He would take another win the next round in Kuwait, rounding out his FRMEC campaign with fifth place in Race 3. With these results, Beganovic placed 11th in the standings with 62 points.

=== FIA Formula 3 Championship ===
==== 2023 ====
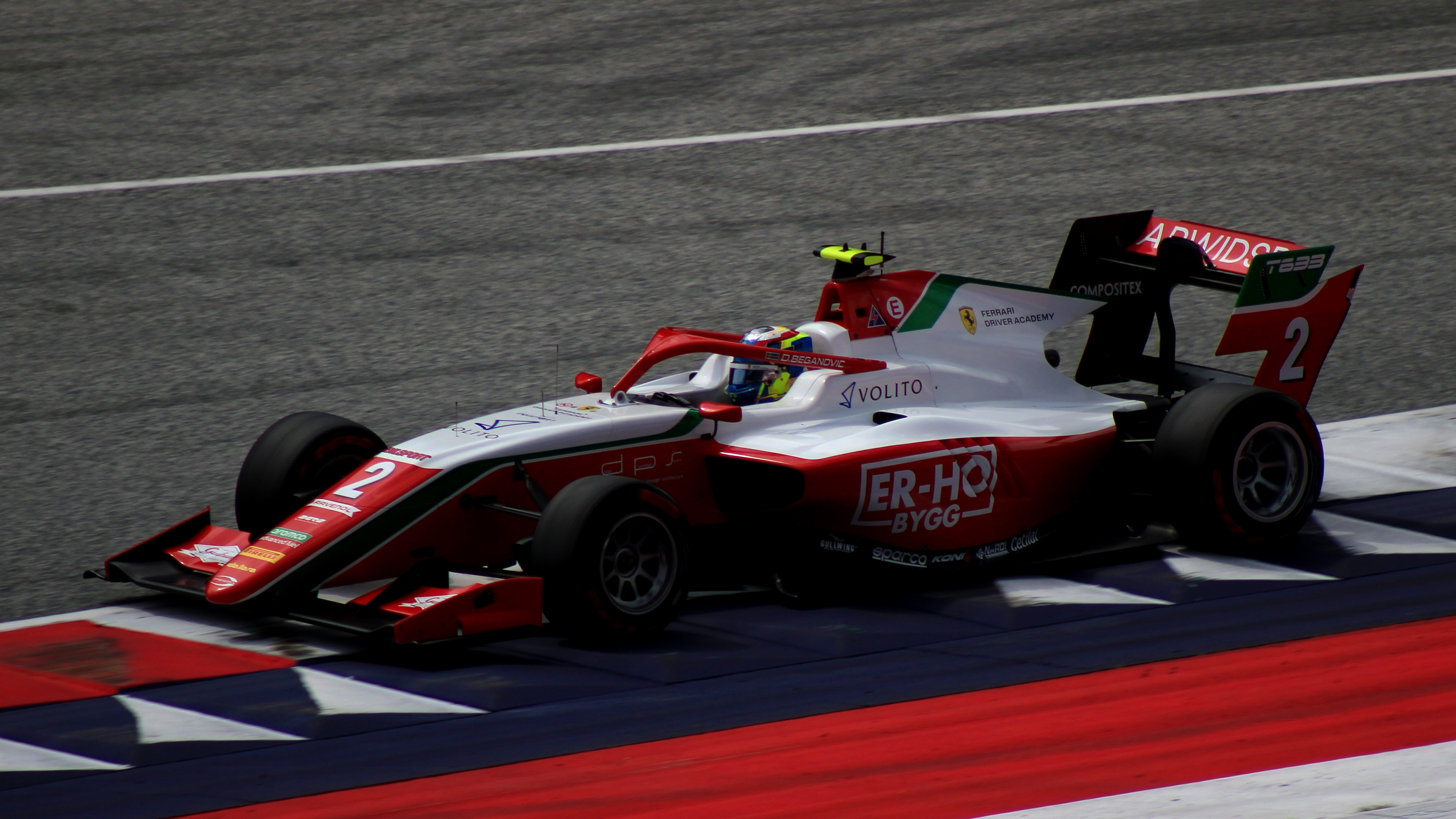
Beganovic driving the Dallara F3 2019 during the 2023 Spielberg Formula 3 round.

On 20 September, Prema announced that Beganovic would be participating in a three-day FIA F3 test at Jerez, alongside Paul Aron and Zak O'Sullivan. A month later, Beganovic was confirmed to drive for the team in the FIA Formula 3 Championship, having the "FDA [do] everything to get a 2023 F3 seat at Prema". The campaign began with promise, as he took his maiden podium during the feature race at the Bahrain season opener after finishing fourth on Saturday, having come through from his starting spot of eighth. Another eighth in qualifying followed in Melbourne and he finished in fifth place for the sprint, but a penalty after a last-lap collision with Caio Collet during the feature race demoted Beganovic out of the points. In Monaco, Beganovic set the fastest lap in his qualifying group to secure a front row start. After failing to score during the sprint race, Beganovic was able to follow polesitter Gabriele Minì home, taking a second place and his second podium of the series. In Barcelona, described by Beganovic as "not [his] strongest circuit", yielded a mixed bag, as the Swede compensated for a retirement in the sprint race owing to a collision caused by Grégoire Saucy to finish third during the feature race, which moved him to third in the standings. In Austria, he qualified on the front row, missing out on pole by 0.004s. though he dropped back on Sunday due to high amounts of tyre degradation, which he explained had come as a result of him pushing "way too hard" in the early stages of the contest.

In qualifying for the event at Silverstone, an engine issue befell Beganovic's car before he could set a flying lap, forcing him to start from last place. Despite gaining a total of 33 places throughout the two races, Beganovic was forced to cope with his first non-scoring round of the campaign. A swift bounce-back in Budapest followed as he secured another front row start in qualifying, before maintaining his position to finish in second place in the feature race, trailing teammate Zak O'Sullivan by two seconds at the finish. He experienced a disappointing weekend in Spa-Francorchamps, as contact with Gabriel Bortoleto in the sprint race caused Beganovic to receive a penalty and drop out of the points, whilst a wrong strategy on a damp track meant he finished down in 16th place. In the Monza season finale, Beganovic's lap was deleted in qualifying, confining him to 23rd. However, he made up places during the races, securing ninth place and points in the season-ending feature race. Beganovic finished his rookie Formula 3 season sixth in the standings with 96 points and four podiums, being the highest placed driver not to win a race.

Beganovic remained with Prema for post-season testing in Jerez, where he set the fastest time overall on the second day. He would compete in the Macau Grand Prix with Prema, alongside Aron and Minì. After finishing fourth in the qualification race, Beganovic crashed out of the main race whilst attempting an overtake for second place on Minì.

==== 2024 ====
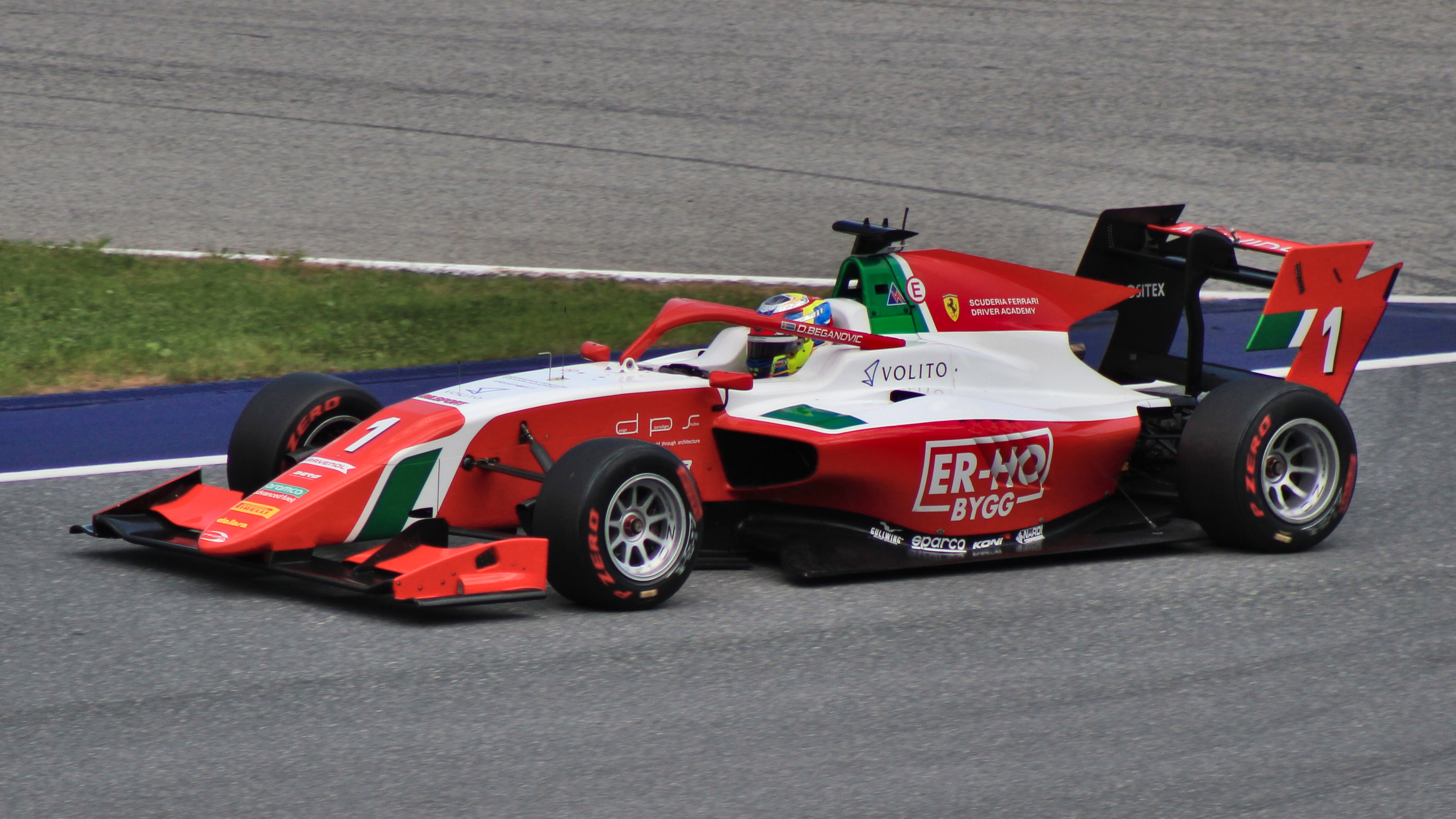
Beganovic driving for Prema Racing during the 2024 Spielberg Formula 3 round

Beganovic remained with Prema Racing for the 2024 season, alongside Gabriele Minì and Red Bull junior Arvid Lindblad. Beganovic achieved his first pole position in the Bahrain opener. However, it went unrewarded as contact in the sprint race forced him to pit on the opening lap, and a start issue in the feature race caused him to plummet to the back. Despite that, he recovered to 13th place. In Melbourne, Beganovic secured third in qualifying. He had a great run in the sprint race as he moved up to sixth place at the flag, only for him to be penalised and dropped to 13th for forcing Sebastián Montoya off-track. In the feature race, Beganovic would overhaul teammate Minì and leader Leonardo Fornaroli to get his maiden Formula 3 win. Beganovic had another good weekend in Imola, securing a pair of top-5 finishes.

Beganovic would finish the races seventh and sixth in Monaco, although a red flag in qualifying hampered a chance for him to improve. He then had a challenging Barcelona weekend, where he managed only two eighth-places in the races. In Austria, Beganovic qualified fifth, but a first-lap spin in the sprint race caused him to fall to the back, eventually finishing 15th. In the feature race, he moved into second place in the beginning of the race, staying within DRS range of Luke Browning for the majority of the race. However, teammate Minì soon passed him after the Swede lost DRS, forcing Beganovic to settle with third place. An unlucky timing in qualifying Silverstone confined Beganovic to 19th for both races, and he was unable to recover from there, forcing him to cope with his first non-scoring weekend of the season. Starting on reverse pole for the Budapest sprint race, Beganovic lost out to Nikita Bedrin at the start. Despite fighting with significant tyre wear, he settled for third place after an unsuccessful overtake on Bedrin caused him to lose another position. He finished ninth in the feature race.

Qualifying again on reverse pole in Spa-Francorchamps, Beganovic fended off attacks from Minì to take his second win of the season in mixed conditions. However, he narrowly missed out on points in the feature race with eleventh place, placing him at an outside chance for the title. In the Monza finale, Beganovic finished fourth in the sprint race and ninth in the feature, having been down in 17th place during the latter. He once again finished the season sixth in the standings, this time taking two wins, one pole, four podiums and 109 points. Beganovic returned to the Macau Grand Prix with Prema, he finished the race in eighth.

=== FIA Formula 2 Championship ===
==== 2024 ====
Beganovic made the step up to Formula 2 for the final two rounds of the 2024 season with DAMS Lucas Oil, replacing Juan Manuel Correa and partnering Jak Crawford. On his F2 debut in Qatar, he managed to qualify in an excellent fourth. While he failed to get points in the sprint race after being spun around by Miyata, Beganovic finished fifth in the Qatar feature race. In the Yas Marina season finale, he secured himself fifth in qualifying. In the sprint race, Beganovic took advantage of the chaos to finish in fourth place, but following a disqualification for Paul Aron, Beganovic was promoted to third, scoring his first Formula 2 podium. The next day, he finished seventh despite gear issues during the race. Throughout his two-round cameo appearance, Beganovic scored 22 points and finished 20th in the standings.

==== 2025 ====
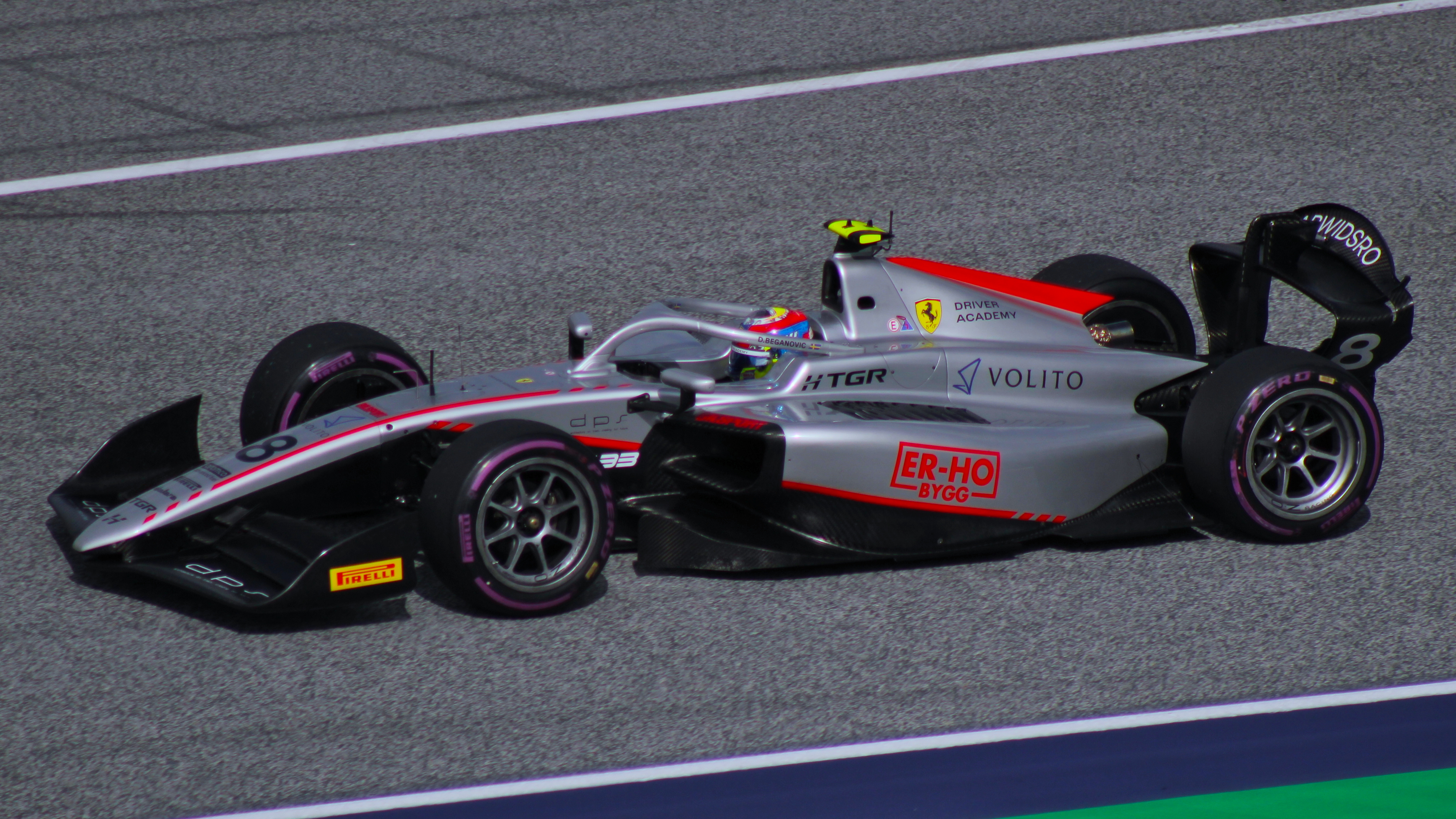
Beganovic driving the Dallara F2 2024 during the 2025 Spielberg Formula 2 round

For the 2025 season, Beganovic switched to Hitech TGR for his first full season in the series, partnering Williams junior Luke Browning. He qualified inside the top ten in the Melbourne opener but spun in the sprint race while running in the points. In the Bahrain, Beganovic fought Joshua Dürksen victory in the sprint race before running wide in the closing laps, dropping to fourth; he was later promoted to the podium after Dürksen was disqualified. He followed this with seventh in the feature race, before a difficult weekend in Jeddah yielded no points after qualifying thirteenth. Beganovic secured his maiden Formula 2 pole position in Imola, and converted it to his first feature race podium with third place after being overcut by teammate Browning during the pit stops. However, a disastrous Monaco weekend followed after he qualified eighteenth; despite avoiding the opening-lap pile-up in the feature race, he later crashed at Casino Square mid-race. He endured another non-scoring weekend in Barcelona before returning to the points with ninth in the Austrian feature race, after being eliminated from the sprint by Oliver Goethe.

Further misfortune struck in Silverstone, where a stall on the formation lap forced him to start the sprint race from the pit lane despite being due to start third. He nevertheless recovered to fourth in a wet feature race. Consistent points finishes followed in the next three rounds, including a pair of sixth-place finishes in Monza, where a virtual safety car infringement penalty denied him a sprint race podium after starting from reverse-grid pole. His breakthrough came in Baku, where he claimed his first Formula 2 victory in the sprint race after taking the lead on the opening lap. He completed his strongest weekend of the season by finishing third in the feature race. After taking ninth in the Qatar feature race, which he described as "one of his best races", Beganovic concluded the campaign in Yas Marina with two fourth-place finishes, missing out on another podium in the feature race after a pit lane speeding penalty. He finished seventh in the championship with one victory, one pole position and four podiums.

==== 2026 ====
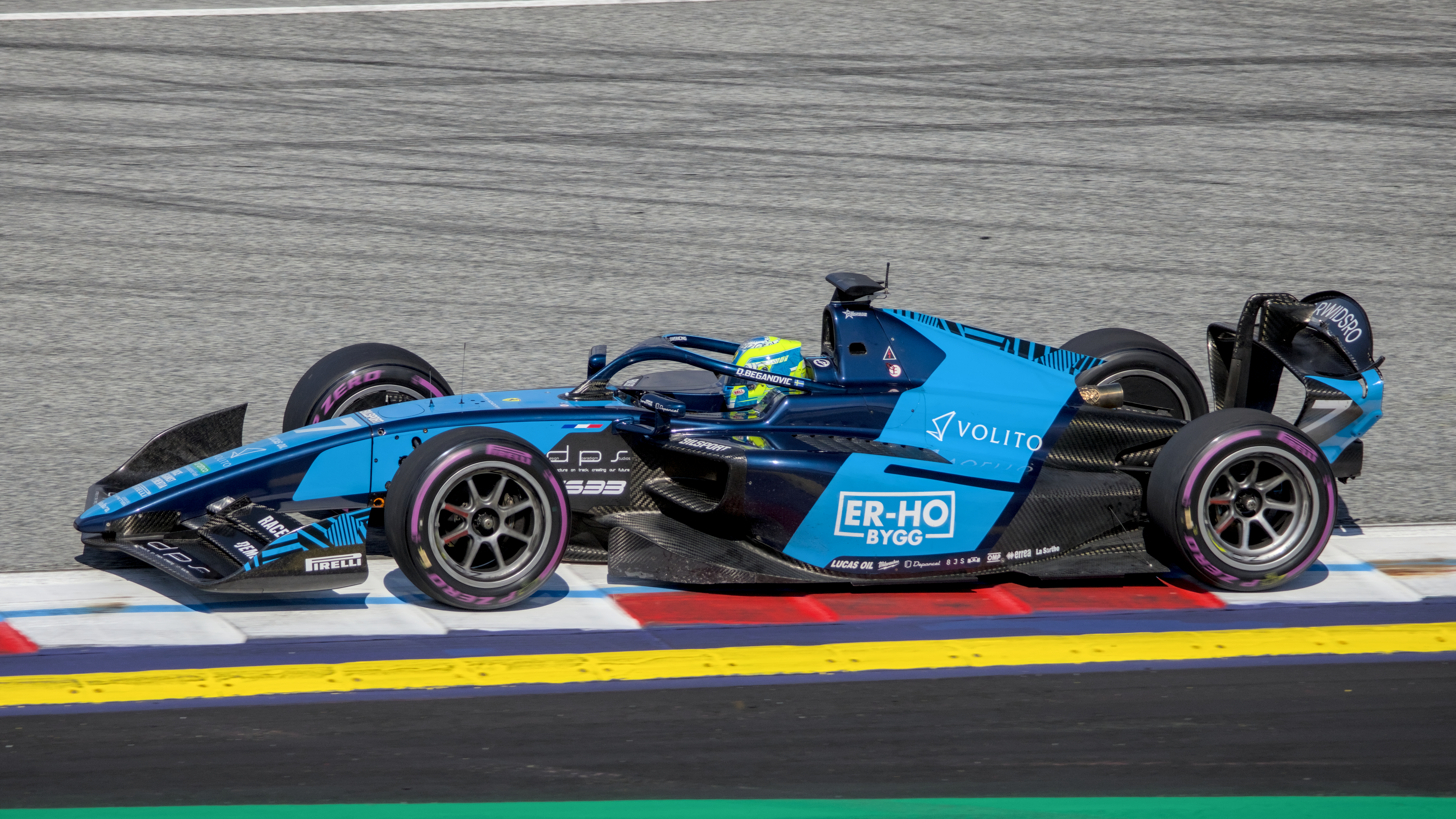
Beganovic driving for DAMS Lucas Oil during the 2026 Spielberg Formula 2 round

Beganovic switched teams for 2026, returning to DAMS Lucas Oil. He secured pole for Australia but retired in the main race. It was a caused due to a problem with his car.

In mid-2026, Beganovic joined A14 Management, the management agency of two-time Formula One world champion Fernando Alonso.

=== Formula One ===
At the start of 2020 and his single-seater career, Beganovic was announced to be joining the Ferrari Driver Academy. During his first days in the Academy, he recounted meeting Laurent Mekies and Mattia Binotto.

During the COVID-19 lockdown, Beganovic raced for Ferrari in the Bahrain Virtual GP. At the end of January 2025, Beganovic experienced his first F1 test at the Circuit de Barcelona-Catalunya, driving the Ferrari SF-23.

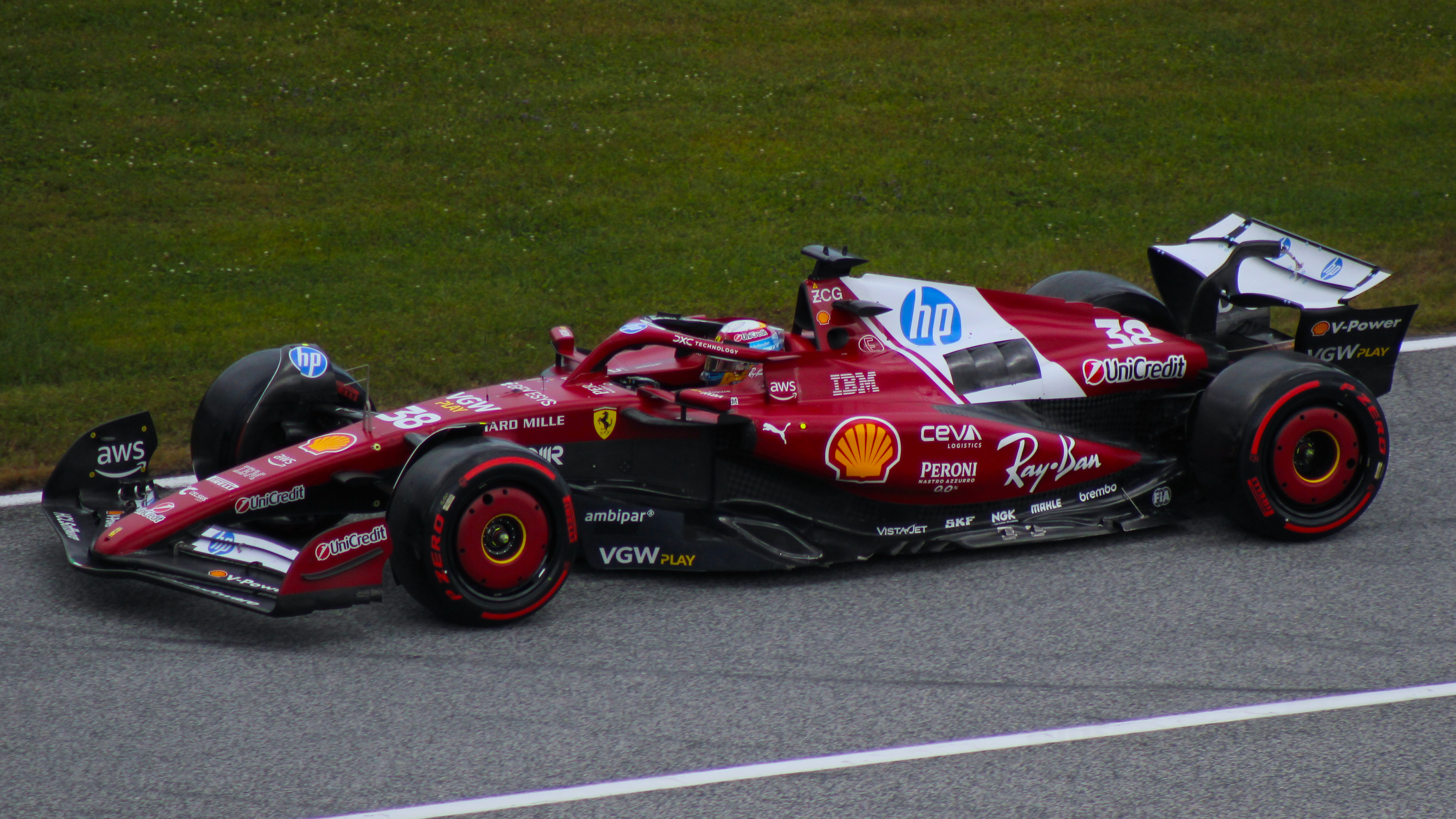
Beganovic driving the Ferrari SF-25 during first practice session of the 2025 Austrian Grand Prix

In March 2025, it was announced that Beganovic would make his free practice debut at the 2025 Bahrain Grand Prix, driving for Ferrari in place of Charles Leclerc. He finished his debut session a respectable fourteenth place, finishing second of the six rookies who partook in that session. He drove for Ferrari for a second time during the free practice session of the Austrian Grand Prix, once again taking Leclerc's seat. At the end of the year, Beganovic took part in the young drivers' test with Ferrari at the Yas Marina Circuit, completing 122 laps.

Beganovic continued to make free practice appearances in 2026 with Ferrari, participating at the Barcelona-Catalunya and Austrian Grands Prix, finishing ninth in the latter session. Later in the year, he also participated in free practice for the São Paulo and Las Vegas Grand Prix.

==== Ferrari reserve role (2027–) ====
In October 2026, it was announced that Beganovic would serve as one of Ferrari's reserve drivers alongside Antonio Giovinazzi for 2027.

=== Formula E ===
In July 2025, Beganovic sampled a Formula E car for the first time at the Tempelhof Airport Street Circuit, driving for Mahindra Racing during the Formula E Berlin rookie test, finishing fifth in the morning session.

== Personal life ==
Beganovic was born in Linköping, Sweden. His parents, Fikret and Mirnesa emigrated to Sweden from Zenica, Bosnia and Herzegovina before he was born. He has a younger brother, Emir, who plays football for Åtvidabergs FF. At home, the family spoke Bosnian, and during his childhood he frequently visited his grandmother in Zenica. Due to the demands of his racing career, his visits to Bosnia and Herzegovina have become less frequent in recent years.

Beganovic's interest in speed and motorsport developed at an early age. His father, a mechanic at Volvo, introduced him to Formula One, which they frequently watched together on television. As a child he considered Ferrari his favourite team.

Beganovic was given the opportunity to try karting through a national program that visited schools across Sweden, including his hometown of Linköping. After his first experience, the family purchased a used go-kart, and he began practicing regularly.

In addition to his native Swedish and Bosnian languages, Beganovic also speaks English and Italian.

In May 2023, Beganovic hit a motorcycle at an intersection while driving in Örebro. The motorcycle rider sustained serious injuries, breaking his neck, back, leg and collarbone, and used a wheelchair for three months. A court later ruled that Beganovic caused the accident and convicted him of causing bodily harm, for which he was fined SEK 16,000 and ordered to pay damages of SEK 8,400.

== Karting record ==
=== Karting career summary ===
Season	Series	Team	Position
2011	MKR Series Sweden — Cadet	Linköpings MS	NC
2013	Juniorfestivalen — Formula Micro		13th
2014	Lidköping Open — Junior 60	Ward Racing	10th
2015	Kristianstad KK Grande Finale — Junior 60	Ward Racing	**1st**
2015	Juniorfestivalen — Junior 60	Ward Racing	**1st**
2015	Göteborgs Stora Pris — Junior 60	Ward Racing	**1st**
2015	MKR Series Sweden — Junior 60	Ward Racing	**2nd**
2015	Lidköping Open — Junior 60	Ward Racing	**1st**
2015	Tom Trana Trophy — Junior 60	Ward Racing	5th
2015	Sydsvenskans Kart Champion Cup — Junior 60	Ward Racing	7th
2015	Swedish Karting Championship — Junior 60	Ward Racing	22nd
2016	Juniorfestivalen — Junior 60	Ward Racing	**2nd**
2016	Göteborgs Stora Pris — Junior 60	Ward Racing	**2nd**
2016	WSK Super Master Series — 60 Mini	Ward Racing	100th
2016	Swedish Karting Championship — Junior 60	Ward Racing	30th
2016	WSK Final Cup — 60 Mini	Ward Racing	18th
2017	WSK Champions Cup — OKJ	Ward Racing	34th
2017	WSK Super Master Series — OKJ	Ward Racing	25th
2017	CIK-FIA European Championship — OKJ	Ward Racing	23rd
2017	Swedish Karting Championship — OKJ	Ward Racing	13th
2017	CIK-FIA World Championship — OKJ	Ward Racing	31st
2017	Trofeo delle Industrie — OKJ	Ward Racing	**3rd**
2017	WSK Final Cup — OKJ	Ward Racing	28th
2018	WSK Champions Cup — OKJ	Ward Racing	7th
2018	South Garda Winter Cup — OKJ	Ward Racing	14th
2018	WSK Super Master Series — OKJ	Ward Racing	8th
2018	CIK-FIA European Championship — OKJ	Ward Racing	9th
2018	Swedish Karting Championship — OKJ	Ward Racing	**1st**
2018	CIK-FIA World Championship — OKJ	Ward Racing	7th
2018	WSK Final Cup — OK	Ward Racing	18th
2019	South Garda Winter Cup — OK	Ward Racing	28th
2019	WSK Super Master Series — OK	Ward Racing	4th
2019	WSK Euro Series — OK	Ward Racing	**2nd**
2019	Championnat de France — OK	Ward Racing	14th
2019	CIK-FIA European Championship — OK	Ward Racing	6th
2019	Italian Championship — OK	Ward Racing	**1st**
2019	Swedish Karting Championship — OK	Ward Racing	**1st**
2019	CIK-FIA World Championship — OK	Ward Racing	27th

=== Complete CIK-FIA Karting European Championship results ===
(key) (Races in bold indicate pole position) (Races in italics indicate fastest lap)

Year	Team	Class	1	2	3	4	5	6	7	8	9	10	DC	Points
2017	Ward Racing	OKJ	SAR; QH; 28	SAR; R 28	CAY; QH; 20	CAY; R 22	LEM; QH; 52	LEM; R DNQ	ALA; QH; 7	ALA; R 9	KRI; QH; 30	KRI; R 24	23rd	11
2018	Ward Racing	OKJ	SAR; QH; 2	SAR; R 6	PFI; QH; 30	PFI; R 9	AMP; QH; 15	AMP; R (13)	ESS; QH; 18	ESS; R 10			9th	32
2019	Ward Racing	OK	ANG; QH; 8	ANG; R 16	GEN; QH; 6	GEN; R 3	KRI; QH (10)	KRI; R 27	LEM; QH; 6	LEM; R 11			6th	34

== Racing record ==
=== Racing career summary ===
Season	Series	Team	Races	Wins	Poles	F/Laps	Podiums	Points	Position
2020	Italian F4 Championship	Prema Powerteam	20	1	2	4	6	179	**3rd**
2020	ADAC Formula 4 Championship	Prema Powerteam	6	0	0	0	0	12	16th
2021	F3 Asian Championship	Abu Dhabi Racing by Prema	9	0	0	0	4	88	7th
2021	Formula Regional European Championship	Prema Powerteam	20	0	1	2	1	53	13th
2022	Formula Regional Asian Championship	Mumbai Falcons India Racing	15	1	0	2	5	130	5th
2022	Formula Regional European Championship	Prema Racing	20	4	4	2	12	300	**1st**
2023	Formula Regional Middle East Championship	Mumbai Falcons Racing Limited	6	2	0	1	2	62	11th
2023	FIA Formula 3 Championship	Prema Racing	18	0	0	1	4	96	6th
2023	Macau Grand Prix	SJM Theodore Prema Racing	1	0	0	0	0	N/A	DNF
2024	FIA Formula 3 Championship	Prema Racing	20	2	1	2	4	109	6th
2024	FIA Formula 2 Championship	DAMS Lucas Oil	4	0	0	0	1	22	20th
2024	Macau Grand Prix	SJM Theodore Prema Racing	1	0	0	0	0	N/A	8th
2025	FIA Formula 2 Championship	Hitech TGR	27	1	1	5	4	116	7th
2025	Formula One	Scuderia Ferrari HP	Test driver						
2026	FIA Formula 2 Championship	DAMS Lucas Oil	24	2	2	1	5	131	5th*
2026	Formula One	Scuderia Ferrari HP	Test driver						

* Season still in progress.

=== Complete Italian F4 Championship results ===
(key) (Races in bold indicate pole position) (Races in italics indicate fastest lap)

Year	Team	1	2	3	4	5	6	7	8	9	10	11	12	13	14	15	16	17	18	19	20	21	Pos	Points
2020	Prema Powerteam	MIS; 1; 5	MIS; 2; 19	MIS; 3; 3	**IMO1**; **1**; 4	IMO1; 2; 4	IMO1; 3; 12	RBR; 1; 11	RBR; 2; 5	RBR; 3; 8	MUG; 1; 6	MUG; 2; 3	MUG; 3; 2	MNZ; 1; 17	MNZ; 2; 15	MNZ; 3; 7	IMO2; 1; 2	**IMO2**; **2**; 1	IMO2; 3; 3	VLL; 1; 5	VLL; 2 C	VLL; 3; 10	3rd	179

=== Complete ADAC Formula 4 Championship results ===
(key) (Races in bold indicate pole position) (Races in italics indicate fastest lap)

Year	Team	1	2	3	4	5	6	7	8	9	10	11	12	13	14	15	16	17	18	19	20	21	Pos	Points
2020	Prema Powerteam	LAU1; 1	LAU1; 2	LAU1; 3	NÜR1; 1 Ret	NÜR1; 2; 11	NÜR1; 3; 8	HOC; 1; 7	HOC; 2; 9	HOC; 3; 16	NÜR2; 1	NÜR2; 2	NÜR2; 3	RBR; 1	RBR; 2	RBR; 3	LAU2; 1	LAU2; 2	LAU2; 3	OSC; 1	OSC; 2	OSC; 3	16th	12

=== Complete Formula Regional Asian Championship results ===
(key) (Races in bold indicate pole position) (Races in italics indicate fastest lap)

Year	Entrant	1	2	3	4	5	6	7	8	9	10	11	12	13	14	15	DC	Points
2021	Abu Dhabi Racing by Prema	DUB; 1; 5	DUB; 2; 2	DUB; 3; 2	ABU; 1; 21†	ABU; 2; 3	ABU; 3; 11	ABU; 1; 4	ABU; 2; 3	ABU; 3 Ret	DUB; 1	DUB; 2	DUB; 3	ABU; 1	ABU; 2	ABU; 3	7th	88
2022	Mumbai Falcons India Racing	ABU; 1; 5	ABU; 2 Ret	ABU; 3; 11	DUB; 1; 5	DUB; 2; 2	DUB; 3; 5	DUB; 1; 3	DUB; 2; 1	DUB; 3; 15	DUB; 1 Ret	DUB; 2; 14	DUB; 3; 27†	ABU; 1; 2	ABU; 2; 2	ABU; 3; 7	5th	130

^{†} Driver did not finish the race, but was classified as they completed over 75% of the race distance.

=== Complete Formula Regional European Championship results ===
(key) (Races in bold indicate pole position) (Races in italics indicate fastest lap)

Year	Team	1	2	3	4	5	6	7	8	9	10	11	12	13	14	15	16	17	18	19	20	DC	Points
2021	Prema Powerteam	IMO; 1; 8	IMO; 2; 19	CAT; 1; 15	CAT; 2; 10	MCO; 1; 17	MCO; 2 Ret	LEC; 1; 10	LEC; 2; 11	ZAN; 1; 8	ZAN; 2; 17	SPA; 1; 4	SPA; 2; 14	RBR; 1; 14	RBR; 2; 11	VAL; 1; 10	VAL; 2 Ret	MUG; 1 Ret	MUG; 2; 2	MNZ; 1; 5	**MNZ**; **2**; 31†	13th	53
2022	Prema Racing	**MNZ**; **1**; 1	MNZ; 2; 2	IMO; 1; 1	IMO; 2; 2	MCO; 1; 2	**MCO**; **2**; 1	**LEC**; **1**; 2	LEC; 2; 2	ZAN; 1; 4	ZAN; 2; 3	HUN; 1; 7	HUN; 2; 16	**SPA**; **1**; 1	SPA; 2; 3	RBR; 1; 4	RBR; 2; 2	CAT; 1; 11	CAT; 2; 10	MUG; 1; 4	MUG; 2; 3	1st	300

=== Complete Formula Regional Middle East Championship results ===
(key) (Races in bold indicate pole position) (Races in italics indicate fastest lap)

Year	Entrant	1	2	3	4	5	6	7	8	9	10	11	12	13	14	15	DC	Points
2023	Mumbai Falcons Racing Limited	DUB1; 1; 1	DUB1; 2 Ret	DUB1; 3; 9	KUW1; 1; 1	KUW1; 2; 15	KUW1; 3; 5	KUW2; 1	KUW2; 2	KUW2; 3	DUB2; 1	DUB2; 2	DUB2; 3	ABU; 1	ABU; 2	ABU; 3	11th	62

=== Complete FIA Formula 3 Championship results ===
(key) (Races in bold indicate pole position) (Races in italics indicate fastest lap)

Year	Entrant	1	2	3	4	5	6	7	8	9	10	11	12	13	14	15	16	17	18	19	20	DC	Points
2023	Prema Racing	BHR; SPR; 4	BHR; FEA; 3	MEL; SPR; 5	MEL; FEA; 13	MON; SPR; 12	MON; FEA; 2	CAT; SPR; Ret	CAT; FEA; 3	RBR; SPR; 8	RBR; FEA; 5	SIL; SPR; 13	SIL; FEA; 14	HUN; SPR; 10	HUN; FEA; 2	SPA; SPR; 22	SPA; FEA; 16	MNZ; SPR; 13	MNZ; FEA; 9			6th	96
2024	Prema Racing	BHR; SPR; 29	**BHR**; **FEA**; 13	MEL; SPR; 13	MEL; FEA; 1	IMO; SPR; 4	IMO; FEA; 5	MON; SPR; 7	MON; FEA; 6	CAT; SPR; 8	CAT; FEA; 8	RBR; SPR; 15	RBR; FEA; 3	SIL; SPR; 11	SIL; FEA; 19	HUN; SPR; 3	HUN; FEA; 9	SPA; SPR; 1	SPA; FEA; 11	MNZ; SPR; 4	MNZ; FEA; 9	6th	109

=== Complete Macau Grand Prix results ===
Year	Team	Car	Qualifying	Quali Race	Main race
2023	(Hong Kong) SJM Theodore Prema Racing	Dallara F3 2019	**3rd**	4th	DNF
2024	(Hong Kong) SJM Theodore Prema Racing	Tatuus F3 T-318	15th	10th	8th

=== Complete FIA Formula 2 Championship results ===
(key) (Races in bold indicate pole position) (Races in italics indicate fastest lap)

Year	Entrant	1	2	3	4	5	6	7	8	9	10	11	12	13	14	15	16	17	18	19	20	21	22	23	24	25	26	27	28	29	DC	Points
2024	DAMS Lucas Oil	BHR; SPR	BHR; FEA	JED; SPR	JED; FEA	MEL; SPR	MEL; FEA	IMO; SPR	IMO; FEA	MON; SPR	MON; FEA	CAT; SPR	CAT; FEA	RBR; SPR	RBR; FEA	SIL; SPR	SIL; FEA	HUN; SPR	HUN; FEA	SPA; SPR	SPA; FEA	MNZ; SPR	MNZ; FEA	BAK; SPR	BAK; FEA	LSL; SPR; 10	LSL; FEA; 5	YMC; SPR; 3	YMC; FEA; 7		20th	22
2025	Hitech TGR	MEL; SPR; 14	MEL; FEA; C	BHR; SPR; 3	BHR; FEA; 7	JED; SPR; 15	JED; FEA; 13	IMO; SPR; 12	**IMO**; **FEA**; 3	MON; SPR; 15	MON; FEA; Ret	CAT; SPR; 15	CAT; FEA; 15	RBR; SPR; Ret	RBR; FEA; 9	SIL; SPR; 18	SIL; FEA; 4	SPA; SPR; 16	SPA; FEA; 7	HUN; SPR; 8	HUN; FEA; 7	MNZ; SPR; 6	MNZ; FEA; 6	BAK; SPR; 1	BAK; FEA; 3	LSL; SPR; 9	LSL; FEA; 9	YMC; SPR; 4	YMC; FEA; 4		7th	116
2026	DAMS Lucas Oil	MEL; SPR; 20	**MEL**; **FEA**; Ret	MIA; SPR; 8	MIA; FEA; 2	MTL; SPR; 6	MTL; FEA; Ret	MON; SPR; 5	MON; FEA; 3	CAT; SPR; 7	CAT; FEA; 6	RBR; SPR; 13	RBR; FEA; 13	SIL; SPR; 6	SIL; FEA; 12	SPA; SPR; 3	SPA; FEA; Ret	HUN; SPR; 2	HUN; FEA; 6	MNZ; SPR; 12	MNZ; FEA; 14	MAD; SPR; 10	**MAD**; **FEA**; 1	BAK; SPR; 1	BAK; FEA1; 3	BAK; FEA2; 7	LSL; SPR	LSL; FEA	YMC; SPR	YMC; FEA	5th*	137*

* Season still in progress.

=== Complete Formula One participations ===
(key) (Races in bold indicate pole position) (Races in italics indicate fastest lap)

Year	Entrant	Chassis	Engine	1	2	3	4	5	6	7	8	9	10	11	12	13	14	15	16	17	18	19	20	21	22	23	24	WDC	Points
2025	Scuderia Ferrari HP	Ferrari SF-25	Ferrari 066/12 1.6 V6 t	AUS	CHN	JPN	BHR; TD	SAU	MIA	EMI	MON	ESP	CAN	AUT; TD	GBR	BEL	HUN	NED	ITA	AZE	SIN	USA	MXC	SAP	LVG	QAT	ABU	–	–
2026	Scuderia Ferrari HP	Ferrari SF-26	Ferrari 067/6 1.6 V6 t	AUS	CHN	JPN	MIA	CAN	MON	BCN; TD	AUT; TD	GBR	BEL	HUN	NED	ITA	ESP	AZE	BHR	SIN	USA	MXC	SAP; TD	LVG; TD	QAT	ABU		–	–

Sporting positions
Preceded by Grégoire Saucy	Formula Regional European Championship; Champion; 2022	Succeeded by Andrea Kimi Antonelli
