= Jean-Paul Driot =

French motorsport personality (b. 1950, d. 2019)

- Born: 7 October 1950
- Died: 4 August 2019 (aged 68)

Jean-Paul Driot (7 October 1950 – 3 August 2019) was a French motorsport personality, co-founder of the DAMS team with the former driver of Formula One René Arnoux.

== Career ==
In 1988, Jean-Paul Driot founded with René Arnoux the DAMS team, engaged in the International Formula 3000 championship the following year. In 2005, following the launch of the A1 Grand Prix championship, he acquired the A1 Team France franchise. In 2014, he founded the Renault e.dams team, in partnership with Alain Prost, and entered the Formula E Championship.

== Personal life ==
Driot died on 3 August 2019 after a long battle with leukemia. Driot left behind his wife, Geneviève and his two sons, Olivier and Grégory.
