= 1995 International Formula 3000 Championship =

Motor racing competition

The 1995 International Formula 3000 Championship was contested over eight rounds from May 7 to October 15, 1995. This was the final F3000 season in which teams could use different chassis and engines. At the final race of this season at Magny Cours, Marco Campos was killed after suffering head injuries in a crash. He was the only driver killed in International F3000.

== Teams and drivers ==
| Team | Chassis | Engine | No. | Driver | Rounds |
|---|---|---|---|---|---|
| (France) DAMS | Reynard | Ford Cosworth | 1 | (France) Guillaume Gomez | All |
| (France) DAMS | Reynard | Ford Cosworth | 2 | (Brazil) Tarso Marques | All |
| (United Kingdom) Paul Stewart Racing | Reynard | Ford Cosworth | 3 | (France) Didier Cottaz | All |
| (United Kingdom) Paul Stewart Racing | Reynard | Ford Cosworth | 4 | (United Kingdom) Allan McNish | All |
| (France) Apomatox | Reynard | Ford Cosworth | 5 | (France) Emmanuel Clérico | All |
| (France) Apomatox | Reynard | Ford Cosworth | 6 | (France) Jean-Philippe Belloc | All |
| (United Kingdom) Super Nova Racing | Reynard | Ford Cosworth | 7 | (Brazil) Ricardo Rosset | All |
| (United Kingdom) Super Nova Racing | Reynard | Ford Cosworth | 8 | (Italy) Vincenzo Sospiri | All |
| (Italy) Mythos Racing | Reynard | Judd | 9 | (Italy) Fabrizio De Simone | All |
| (Italy) Mythos Racing | Reynard | Judd | 10 | (France) Christophe Tinseau | All |
| (United Kingdom) Nordic Racing | Lola | Ford Cosworth | 11 | (South Africa) Stephen Watson | All |
| (United Kingdom) Nordic Racing | Lola | Ford Cosworth | 12 | (Belgium) Marc Goossens | All |
| (United Kingdom) Madgwick International | Reynard | Zytek Judd | 14 | (Brazil) Marcos Gueiros | All |
| (United Kingdom) Madgwick International | Reynard | Zytek Judd | 15 | (Sweden) Kenny Bräck | All |
| (Netherlands) Vortex Motorsport | Reynard | Ford Cosworth | 16 | (Netherlands) Jan Lammers | 1-3 |
| (Netherlands) Vortex Motorsport | Reynard | Ford Cosworth | 16 | (Belgium) Wim Eyckmans | 5 |
| (Netherlands) Vortex Motorsport | Reynard | Ford Cosworth | 16 | (United Kingdom) James Taylor | 6-8 |
| (Netherlands) Vortex Motorsport | Reynard | Ford Cosworth | 17 | (Germany) Hans Fertl | 3, 5 |
| (Netherlands) Vortex Motorsport | Reynard | Ford Cosworth | 17 | (Belgium) Stéphane De Groodt | 6, 8 |
| (France) Danielson | Reynard | Ford Cosworth | 18 | (France) Jérôme Policand | 1-3, 5-8 |
| (France) Danielson | Lola | Ford Cosworth | 18 | (France) Jérôme Policand | 4 |
| (France) Danielson | Lola | Ford Cosworth | 19 | (France) Christophe Bouchut | 3-8 |
| (France) Danielson | Reynard | Ford Cosworth | 19 | (France) Christophe Bouchut | 1-2 |
| (Italy) Durango Equipe | Reynard | Ford Cosworth | 20 | (South Africa) Gary Formato | All |
| (Italy) Durango Equipe | Reynard | Ford Cosworth | 21 | (Italy) Christian Pescatori | All |
| (United Kingdom) Omegaland | Reynard | Zytek Judd | 22 | (United Kingdom) Gareth Rees | 1-4 |
| (United Kingdom) Omegaland | Reynard | Zytek Judd | 22 | (Sweden) Peter Olsson | 7-8 |
| (United Kingdom) Omegaland | Reynard | Zytek Judd | 23 | (United Kingdom) Dino Morelli | 1-2 |
| (United Kingdom) Omegaland | Reynard | Zytek Judd | 23 | (Italy) Severino Nardozzi | 4-8 |
| (France) Gosselin Competition | Reynard | Ford Cosworth | 24 | (France) Alain Filhol | 1-3 |
| (France) Gosselin Competition | Reynard | Ford Cosworth | 24 | (Sweden) Peter Olsson | 4-5 |
| (France) Gosselin Competition | Reynard | Ford Cosworth | 24 | (France) Marc Rostan | 7-8 |
| (France) Gosselin Competition | Reynard | Ford Cosworth | 25 | (France) Claude-Yves Gosselin | 1-5, 8 |
| (Italy) Auto Sport Racing | Reynard | Ford Cosworth | 26 | (Japan) Naoki Hattori | 6-7 |
| (Italy) Auto Sport Racing | Reynard | Ford Cosworth | 26 | (Italy) Thomas Biagi | 8 |
| (Italy) Draco Engineering | Lola | Ford Cosworth | 27 | (Brazil) Marco Campos | All |
| (Belgium) Team Astromega | Reynard | Zytek Judd | 28 | (Belgium) Mikke Van Hool | All |
| (Belgium) Racing Wim Eyckmans | Reynard | Ford Cosworth | 29 | (Belgium) Wim Eyckmans | 1-3 |

== Calendar ==
| Round | Circuit | Date | Laps | Distance | Time | Speed | Pole position | Fastest lap | Winner |
|---|---|---|---|---|---|---|---|---|---|
| 1 | (United Kingdom) Silverstone Circuit | 7 May | 40 | 5.057=202.262 km | 1'08:13.35 | 177.885 km/h | (Brazil) Ricardo Rosset | (Brazil) Tarso Marques | (Brazil) Ricardo Rosset |
| 2 | (Spain) Circuit de Catalunya | 13 May | 43 | 4.747=204.121 km | 1'06:56.018 | 182.205 km/h | (United Kingdom) Allan McNish | (France) Emmanuel Clérico | (Italy) Vincenzo Sospiri |
| 3 | (France) Pau Grand Prix | 5 June | 72 | 2.76=198.72 km | 1'26:47.357 | 137.369 km/h | (Brazil) Tarso Marques | (France) Emmanuel Clérico | (Italy) Vincenzo Sospiri |
| 4 | (Italy) Autodromo di Pergusa | 23 July | 40 | 4.95=198.00 km | 1'02:15.387 | 190.824 km/h | (Sweden) Kenny Bräck | (Brazil) Ricardo Rosset | (Brazil) Ricardo Rosset |
| 5 | (Germany) Hockenheimring | 29 July | 29 | 6.823=197.867 km | 0'58:04.329 | 204.436 km/h | (France) Guillaume Gomez | (Brazil) Ricardo Rosset | (Belgium) Marc Goossens |
| 6 | (Belgium) Circuit de Spa-Francorchamps | 27 August | 28 | 6.974=195.272 km | 0'59:03.485 | 198.386 km/h | (United Kingdom) Allan McNish | (France) Guillaume Gomez | (Italy) Vincenzo Sospiri |
| 7 | (Portugal) Autódromo do Estoril | 24 September | 46 | 4.36=200.56 km | 1'11:49.521 | 167.540 km/h | (Brazil) Tarso Marques | (France) Guillaume Gomez | (Brazil) Tarso Marques |
| 8 | (France) Circuit de Nevers Magny-Cours | 15 October | 47 | 4.25=199.75 km | 1'08:59.65 | 173.710 km/h | (Sweden) Kenny Bräck | (Brazil) Tarso Marques | (Sweden) Kenny Bräck |

== Final points standings ==
=== Drivers' Championship ===
| Pos | Driver | SIL (United Kingdom) | CAT (Spain) | PAU (France) | PER (Italy) | HOC (Germany) | SPA (Belgium) | EST (Portugal) | MAG (France) | Points |
|---|---|---|---|---|---|---|---|---|---|---|
| 1 | (Italy) Vincenzo Sospiri | 2 | 1 | 1 | 2 | Ret | 1 | 7 | 4 | 42 |
| 2 | (Brazil) Ricardo Rosset | **1** | 2 | 9 | 1 | 9 | 4 | 5 | Ret | 29 |
| 3 | (Belgium) Marc Goossens | 4 | 5 | 3 | Ret | 1 | Ret | 8 | 2 | 24 |
| 4 | (Sweden) Kenny Bräck | 5 | 13 | 4 | **Ret** | 2 | Ret | 3 | **1** | 24 |
| 5 | (Brazil) Tarso Marques | 12 | 3 | **Ret** | Ret | Ret | 5 | **1** | Ret | 15 |
| 6 | (France) Emmanuel Clérico | Ret | 4 | 7 | Ret | 4 | 6 | 2 | 5 | 15 |
| 7 | (United Kingdom) Allan McNish | 3 | **Ret** | 2 | Ret | 6 | **Ret** | Ret | 7 | 11 |
| 8 | (France) Guillaume Gomez | 13 | 9 | Ret | Ret | **3** | 3 | Ret | DNS | 8 |
| 9 | (Italy) Christian Pescatori | 6 | 15 | Ret | 3 | Ret | Ret | 6 | 6 | 7 |
| 10 | (France) Christophe Bouchut | DSQ | DSQ | 8 | Ret | Ret | 2 | 14 | Ret | 6 |
| 11 | (France) Jean-Philippe Belloc | 8 | DSQ | 5 | Ret | Ret | 13 | Ret | 3 | 6 |
| 12 | (France) Jérôme Policand | Ret | Ret | Ret | 6 | 8 | 10 | 4 | Ret | 4 |
| 13 | (Brazil) Marco Campos | Ret | Ret | 13 | 4 | Ret | 8 | 9 | 10 | 3 |
| 14 | (Italy) Fabrizio De Simone | 7 | Ret | 11 | 5 | Ret | Ret | 11 | Ret | 2 |
| 15 | (Brazil) Marcos Gueiros | 15 | Ret | Ret | Ret | 5 | Ret | Ret | 8 | 2 |
| 16 | (France) Christophe Tinseau | 9 | 6 | Ret | Ret | 7 | 7 | 10 | 14 | 1 |
| 17 | (France) Didier Cottaz | Ret | Ret | 6 | Ret | 11 | 11 | Ret | 11 | 1 |
| 18 | (United Kingdom) Gareth Rees | Ret | 7 | Ret | 8 | | | | | 0 |
| 19 | (South Africa) Stephen Watson | Ret | 11 | 12 | 7 | Ret | 12 | Ret | 12 | 0 |
| 20 | (Belgium) Mikke Van Hool | Ret | 8 | DNQ | Ret | 10 | 9 | Ret | Ret | 0 |
| 21 | (South Africa) Gary Formato | 14 | 14 | Ret | 9 | Ret | Ret | 12 | 13 | 0 |
| 22 | (Italy) Thomas Biagi | | | | | | | | 9 | 0 |
| 23 | (Netherlands) Jan Lammers | 11 | 10 | 10 | | | | | | 0 |
| 24 | (Belgium) Wim Eyckmans | 10 | 12 | 14 | | 12 | | | | 0 |
| 25 | (Sweden) Peter Olsson | | | | 10 | 13 | | 13 | Ret | 0 |
| 26 | (Italy) Severino Nardozzi | | | | 11 | 14 | 14 | 15 | 15 | 0 |
| 27 | (United Kingdom) James Taylor | | | | | | 15 | 17 | DNQ | 0 |
| 28 | (France) Alain Filhol | 16 | 16 | DNQ | | | | | | 0 |
| 29 | (France) Marc Rostan | | | | | | | 16 | 16 | 0 |
| – | (France) Claude-Yves Gosselin | DNQ | DNQ | DNQ | Ret | Ret | | | Ret | 0 |
| – | (Belgium) Stéphane De Groodt | | | | | | Ret | | Ret | 0 |
| – | (Japan) Naoki Hattori | | | | | | Ret | Ret | | 0 |
| – | (United Kingdom) Dino Morelli | Ret | Ret | | | | | | | 0 |
| – | (Germany) Hans Fertl | | | DNQ | | Ret | | | | 0 |
| Pos | Driver | SIL (United Kingdom) | CAT (Spain) | PAU (France) | PER (Italy) | HOC (Germany) | SPA (Belgium) | EST (Portugal) | MAG (France) | Points |

| Colour | Result |
|---|---|
| Gold | Winner |
| Silver | Second place |
| Bronze | Third place |
| Green | Points classification |
| Blue | Non-points classification |
| Blue | Non-classified finish (NC) |
| Purple | Retired, not classified (Ret) |
| Red | Did not qualify (DNQ) |
| Red | Did not pre-qualify (DNPQ) |
| Black | Disqualified (DSQ) |
| White | Did not start (DNS) |
| White | Withdrew (WD) |
| White | Race cancelled (C) |
| Blank | Did not practice (DNP) |
| Blank | Did not arrive (DNA) |
| Blank | Excluded (EX) |

=== Notes ===
- Results in **bold** indicate **pole position**.
- Results in italics indicate fastest lap.
- Drivers who did not finish the race but were classified are marked with .

== Complete overview ==
| first column of every race | 10 | = grid position |

| second column of every race | 10 | = race result |

R13=retired, but classified R=retired NS=did not start NQ=did not qualify NT=no time set in qualifying DIS(18)=disqualified after finishing in eighteenth place (11)=place after practice, but grid position not held free 14E=grid position, but started from the end of the grid

| Place | Name | Team | Chassis | Engine | SIL (United Kingdom) | | CAT (Spain) | | PAU (France) | | PER (Italy) | | HOC (Germany) | | SPA (Belgium) | | EST (Portugal) | | MAG (France) |
| 1 | (Italy) Vincenzo Sospiri | SuperNova Racing | Reynard | Ford Cosworth | 4 | 2 | 6 | 1 | 3 | 1 | 8 | 2 | 10 | R | 3 | 1 | 12 | 7 | 9 | 4 |
| 2 | (Brazil) Ricardo Rosset | SuperNova Racing | Reynard | Ford Cosworth | 1 | 1 | 5 | 2 | 14 | 9 | 2 | 1 | 14 | 9 | 6 | 4 | 4 | 5 | 6 | R |
| 3 | (Sweden) Kenny Bräck | Madgwick International | Reynard | Zytek Judd | 9 | 5 | 15 | R13 | 8 | 4 | 1 | R | 5 | 2 | 21 | R | 5 | 3 | 1 | 1 |
| | (Belgium) Marc Goossens | Nordic Racing | Lola | Ford Cosworth | 7 | 4 | 8 | 5 | 7 | 3 | 13 | R | 3 | 1 | 2 | R | 9 | 8 | 5 | 2 |
| 5 | (Brazil) Tarso Marques | DAMS | Reynard | Ford Cosworth | 2 | 12 | 3 | 3 | 1 | R | 3 | R | 6 | R | 5 | 5 | 1 | 1 | 2 | R |
| | (France) Emmanuel Clérico | Apomatox | Reynard | Ford Cosworth | 8 | R | 4 | 4 | 4 | 7 | 6 | R | 2 | 4 | 7 | 6 | 2 | 2 | 7 | 5 |
| 7 | (United Kingdom) Allan McNish | Paul Stewart Racing | Reynard | Ford Cosworth | 3 | 3 | 1 | R | 5 | 2 | 4 | R | 8 | 6 | 1 | R | 8 | R | 3 | 7 |
| 8 | (France) Guillaume Gomez | DAMS | Reynard | Ford Cosworth | 10 | 13 | 19 | 9 | 2 | R | 5 | NS | 1 | 3 | 4 | 3 | 3 | R | NT | - |
| 9 | (Italy) Christian Pescatori | Durango | Reynard | Ford Cosworth | 13 | 6 | 12 | R15 | 6 | R | 10 | 3 | 9 | R | 9 | R | 6 | 6 | 12 | 6 |
| 10 | (France) Christophe Bouchut | Danielson | Reynard | Ford Cosworth | (11) | NS | 20 | DIS(18) |
| 10 | (France) Christophe Bouchut | Danielson | Lola | Ford Cosworth | | | | | 12 | 8 | 7 | R | 12 | R | 10 | 2 | 13 | R14 | 4 | R |
| | (France) Jean-Philippe Belloc | Apomatox | Reynard | Ford Cosworth | 14 | 8 | 8 | DIS(16) | 9 | 5 | 14 | R | 7 | R | 15 | 13 | 11 | R | 8 | 3 |
| 12 | (France) Jérôme Policand | Danielson | Reynard | Ford Cosworth | 21 | R | 17 | R | 15 | R | | | 16 | 8 | 12 | 10 | 7 | 4 | 13 | R |
| 12 | (France) Jérôme Policand | Danielson | Lola | Ford Cosworth | | | | | | | 11 | 6 |
| 13 | (Brazil) Marco Campos | Draco Engineering | Lola | Ford Cosworth | 5 | R | 7 | R | 16 | 13 | 12 | 4 | 13 | R | 13 | 8 | 10 | 9 | 20 | R10 |
| 14 | (Italy) Fabrizio De Simone | Mythos Racing | Reynard | Zytek Judd | 6 | 7 | 2 | R | 18 | 11 | 16 | 5 | 15 | R | 17 | R | 19 | 11 | 14E | R |
| | (Brazil) Marcos Gueiros | Madgwick International | Reynard | Zytek Judd | 12 | R15 | 10 | R | 17 | R | 9 | R | 11 | 5 | 11 | R | 14 | R | 10 | 8 |
| 16 | (France) Christophe Tinseau | Mythos Racing | Reynard | Zytek Judd | 15 | 9 | 9 | 6 | 11 | R | 15 | R | 4 | 7 | 8 | 7 | 17 | 10 | 15E | 14 |
| | (France) Didier Cottaz | Paul Stewart Racing | Reynard | Ford Cosworth | 16 | R | 11 | R | 10 | 6 | 17 | R | 17 | 11 | 14 | 11 | 16 | R | 11 | 11 |
| - | (United Kingdom) Gareth Rees | Omegaland | Reynard | Zytek Judd | 11 | R | 14 | 7 | 19 | R | 19 | 8 | - | - | - | - | - | - | - | - |
| - | (South Africa) Stephen Watson | Nordic Racing | Lola | Ford Cosworth | 19 | R | 23 | 11 | 20 | 12 | 18 | 7 | 19 | R | 24 | 12 | 21 | R | 17 | 12 |
| - | (Belgium) Mikke Van Hool | Team Astromega | Reynard | Zytek Judd | 17 | R | 22 | 8 | 24 | NQ | 21 | R | 18 | 10 | 18 | 9 | 20 | R | 18 | R |
| - | (South Africa) Gary Formato | Durango | Reynard | Ford Cosworth | 23 | 14 | 24 | 14 | 21 | R | 22 | 9 | 21 | R | 16 | R | 18 | 12 | 19 | 13 |
| - | (Italy) Thomas Biagi | Auto Sport Racing | Reynard | Ford Cosworth | - | - | - | - | - | - | - | - | - | - | - | - | - | - | 16 | 9 |
| - | (Netherlands) Jan Lammers | Vortex | Reynard | Ford Cosworth | 22 | 11 | 16 | 10 | 13 | 10 | - | - | - | - | - | - | - | - | - | - |
| - | (Belgium) Wim Eyckmans | Eyckmans Racing | Reynard | Ford Cosworth | 18 | 10 | 13 | 12 | 22 | R14 | - | - |
| - | (Belgium) Wim Eyckmans | Vortex | Reynard | Ford Cosworth | | | | | | | | | 20 | 12 | - | - | - | - | - | - |
| - | (Sweden) Peter Olsson | Gosselin Competition | Reynard | Ford Cosworth | - | - | - | - | - | - | 20 | 10 | 22 | 13 | - | - |
| - | (Sweden) Peter Olsson | Omegaland | Reynard | Zytek Judd | | | | | | | | | | | | | 22 | 13 | 21 | R |
| - | (Italy) Severino Nardozzi | Omegaland | Reynard | Zytek Judd | - | - | - | - | - | - | 23 | 11 | 24 | 14 | 22 | 14 | 23 | 15 | 24 | 15 |
| - | (United Kingdom) James Taylor | Vortex | Reynard | Ford Cosworth | - | - | - | - | - | - | - | - | - | - | 23 | 15 | 24 | 17 | 26 | NQ |
| - | (France) Alain Filhol | Gosselin Competition | Reynard | Ford Cosworth | 24 | 16 | 25 | 16 | 25 | NQ | - | - | - | - | - | - | - | - | - | - |
| - | (France) Marc Rostan | Gosselin Competition | Reynard | Ford Cosworth | - | - | - | - | - | - | - | - | - | - | - | - | 25 | 16 | 23 | 16 |
| - | (France) Claude-Yves Gosselin | Gosselin Competition | Reynard | Ford Cosworth | 26 | NQ | 26 | NQ | 26 | NQ | 24 | R | 25 | R | - | - | - | - | 23 | R |
| - | (United Kingdom) Dino Morelli | Omegaland | Reynard | Zytek Judd | 20 | R | 21 | R | - | - | - | - | - | - | - | - | - | - | - | - |
| - | (Japan) Naoki Hattori | Auto Sport Racing | Reynard | Ford Cosworth | - | - | - | - | - | - | - | - | - | - | 19 | R | 15 | R | - | - |
| - | (Belgium) Stéphane De Groodt | Vortex | Reynard | Ford Cosworth | - | - | - | - | - | - | - | - | - | - | 20 | R | - | - | 22 | R |
| - | (Germany) Hans Fertl | Vortex | Reynard | Ford Cosworth | - | - | - | - | 23 | NQ | - | - | 23 | R | - | - | - | - | - | - |
