= 1996 International Formula 3000 Championship =

Motor racing competition

The 1996 International Formula 3000 Championship was contested over ten rounds from 11 May to 12 October 1996. This was the first F3000 season in which every team had the same chassis, engine and tyres.

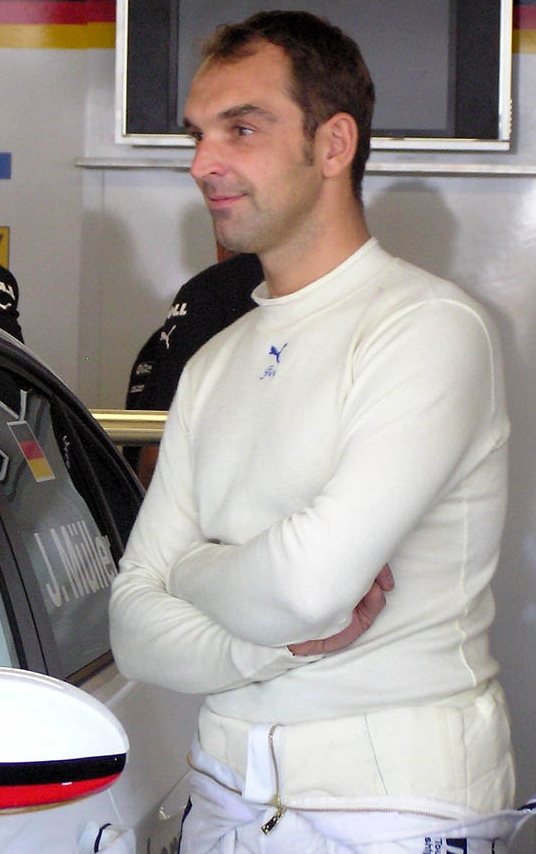
Jörg Müller (pictured in 2007), won the Drivers' Championship driving for RSM Marko.

== Drivers and constructors ==
Team	No.	Driver	Rounds
(United Kingdom) Super Nova Racing	1	(Sweden) Kenny Bräck	All
(United Kingdom) Super Nova Racing	2	(Brazil) Marcos Gueiros	All
(United Kingdom) Madgwick International	3	(Portugal) Pedro Couceiro	1-6
(United Kingdom) Madgwick International	4	(France) Marc Rostan	9-10
(United Kingdom) Nordic Racing	5	(United States) Elton Julian	All
(United Kingdom) Nordic Racing	6	(Japan) Akira Iida	All
(France) DAMS	7	(France) Jean-Philippe Belloc	All
(France) DAMS	8	(France) Laurent Redon	All
(France) Apomatox	9	(France) Christophe Tinseau	All
(France) Apomatox	10	(France) Cyrille Sauvage	All
(Austria) RSM Marko	11	(Austria) Oliver Tichy	All
(Austria) RSM Marko	33	(Germany) Jörg Müller	All
(Italy) Durango Equipe	14	(Italy) Fabrizio Gollin	All
(Italy) Durango Equipe	15	(Italy) Christian Pescatori	All
(Italy) Draco Engineering	16	(Brazil) Ricardo Zonta	All
(Italy) Draco Engineering	17	(Brazil) Alexandre de Andrade	1
(Italy) Draco Engineering	17	(Brazil) Sergio Paese	2-4
(Italy) Draco Engineering	17	(Argentina) Esteban Tuero	5-10
(Belgium) Team Astromega	18	(France) Guillaume Gomez	1-9
(Belgium) Team Astromega	19	(Belgium) Marc Goossens	All
(Italy) Auto Sport Racing	20	(Italy) Thomas Biagi	1-4, 6-10
(Italy) Auto Sport Racing	21	(Argentina) Gastón Mazzacane	All
(United Kingdom) Bob Salisbury Engineering	22	(United Kingdom) James Taylor	5-10
(United Kingdom) Team Alpha Plus	24	(South Africa) Stephen Watson	All
(United Kingdom) Team Alpha Plus	25	(Sweden) Carl Rosenblad	All
(United Kingdom) Edenbridge Racing	26	(France) David Dussau	1-2
(United Kingdom) Edenbridge Racing	26	(Denmark) Tom Kristensen	4-6, 9-10
(United Kingdom) Edenbridge Racing	26	(Argentina) Norberto Fontana	8
(United Kingdom) Edenbridge Racing	27	(Sweden) Peter Olsson	1-3
(United Kingdom) Edenbridge Racing	27	(United Kingdom) Steve Arnold	5
(United Kingdom) Edenbridge Racing	27	(Portugal) Pedro Couceiro	8-10
(United Kingdom) Pacific Racing	28	(France) Patrick Lemarié	All
(United Kingdom) Pacific Racing	29	(Brazil) Cristiano da Matta	All
(Italy) Shannon Racing Team Italia	30	(Denmark) Tom Kristensen	1-2
(Italy) Shannon Racing Team Italia	31	(Italy) Luca Rangoni	2

== Calendar ==
Round	Circuit	Date	Laps	Distance	Time	Speed	Pole position	Fastest lap	Winner
1	(Germany) Nürburgring	11 May	43	4.556=195.908 km	1'07:04.885	175.227 km/h	(Sweden) Kenny Bräck	(Sweden) Kenny Bräck (Germany) Jörg Müller	(Sweden) Kenny Bräck
2	(France) Pau Grand Prix	27 May	72	2.760=198.720 km	1'28:55.055	134.093 km/h	(Denmark) Tom Kristensen	(Denmark) Tom Kristensen	(Germany) Jörg Müller
3	(Italy) Autodromo di Pergusa	21 July	40	4.950=198.000 km	1'03:33.989	186.891 km/h	(Belgium) Marc Goossens	(Germany) Jörg Müller	(Belgium) Marc Goossens
4	(Germany) Hockenheimring	27 July	29	6.823=197.867 km	0'59:58.819	197.932 km/h	(Sweden) Kenny Bräck	(Sweden) Kenny Bräck	(Sweden) Kenny Bräck
5	(United Kingdom) Silverstone Circuit	18 August	40	5.072=202.880 km	1'09:17.948	175.656 km/h	(Sweden) Kenny Bräck	(Denmark) Tom Kristensen	(Sweden) Kenny Bräck
6	(Belgium) Circuit de Spa-Francorchamps	24 August	22	6.968=153.296 km	0'48:24.693	189.991 km/h	(Denmark) Tom Kristensen	(Germany) Jörg Müller	(Germany) Jörg Müller
7	(France) Circuit de Nevers Magny-Cours	14 September	47	4.250=199.750 km	1'10:45.670	169.373 km/h	(Belgium) Marc Goossens	(Sweden) Kenny Bräck	(Belgium) Marc Goossens
8	(Portugal) Autódromo do Estoril	21 September	46	4.360=200.560 km	1'14:55.143	160.621 km/h	(Germany) Jörg Müller	(Brazil) Ricardo Zonta	(Brazil) Ricardo Zonta
9	(Italy) Mugello Circuit	28 September	38	5.245=199.31 km	1'05:44.337	181.910 km/h	(Brazil) Ricardo Zonta	(Brazil) Ricardo Zonta	(Brazil) Ricardo Zonta
10	(Germany) Hockenheimring	12 October	29	6.823=197.867 km	0'59:24.317	199.848 km/h	(Germany) Jörg Müller	(Germany) Jörg Müller	(France) Christophe Tinseau

== Final points standings ==
=== Drivers' Championship ===
Pos	Driver	NÜR (Germany)	PAU (France)	PER (Italy)	HOC (Germany)	SIL (United Kingdom)	SPA (Belgium)	MAG (France)	EST (Portugal)	MUG (Italy)	HOC (Germany)	Points
1	(Germany) Jörg Müller	2	1	2	2	Ret	1	3	**2**	2	**Ret**	52
2	(Sweden) Kenny Bräck	**1**	2	Ret	**1**	**1**	5	2	3	3	DSQ	49
3	(Belgium) Marc Goossens	Ret	Ret	**1**	Ret	16	2	**1**	4	6	Ret	28
4	(Brazil) Ricardo Zonta	Ret	3	Ret	6	3	9	Ret	1	**1**	11	27
5	(Brazil) Marcos Gueiros	3	Ret	4	3	4	15	Ret	Ret	17	2	20
6	(France) Christophe Tinseau	8	Ret	3	4	6	6	9	11	11	1	18
7	(Denmark) Tom Kristensen	4	**Ret**		5	2	**3**			4	Ret	18
8	(France) Laurent Redon	6	Ret	10	Ret	Ret	12	4	DSQ	8	4	7
9	(Brazil) Cristiano da Matta	9	4	5	Ret	Ret	10	5	7	Ret	Ret	7
10	(Austria) Oliver Tichy	11	DNQ	6	Ret	Ret	8	Ret	Ret	7	3	5
11	(Italy) Christian Pescatori	10	Ret	Ret	9	5	4	Ret	Ret	Ret	Ret	5
12	(Italy) Thomas Biagi	Ret	DNQ	8	DSQ		DNQ	6	6	5	7	4
13	(Portugal) Pedro Couceiro	5	Ret	7	Ret	Ret	13		8	15	Ret	2
14	(United States) Elton Julian	13	DNS	Ret	Ret	7	14	12	18	14	5	2
15	(France) Patrick Lemarié	12	5	13	10	8	Ret	8	15	Ret	8	2
16	(Italy) Fabrizio Gollin	Ret	10	9	Ret	9	11	Ret	5	22	DNQ	2
17	(France) Cyrille Sauvage	Ret	7	Ret	7	10	7	Ret	13	12	6	1
18	(Italy) Luca Rangoni		6									1
19	(France) Jean-Philippe Belloc	7	9	Ret	8	17	20	Ret	14	9	Ret	0
20	(France) Guillaume Gomez	Ret	DNS	12	11	12	18	7	9	10		0
21	(Japan) Akira Iida	14	8	11	12	13	Ret	14	12	18	9	0
22	(Argentina) Gastón Mazzacane	Ret	DNQ	14	Ret	11	19	Ret	10	Ret	Ret	0
23	(South Africa) Stephen Watson	Ret	Ret	Ret	Ret	18	16	11	Ret	16	10	0
24	(Argentina) Esteban Tuero					14	17	10	Ret	13	Ret	0
25	(Sweden) Carl Rosenblad	Ret	DNQ	Ret	13	19	Ret	13	Ret	19	12	0
26	(United Kingdom) James Taylor					Ret	Ret	15	Ret	21	Ret	0
27	(United Kingdom) Steve Arnold					15						0
28	(France) Marc Rostan									23	Ret	0
–	(Sweden) Peter Olsson	DSQ	DNQ	Ret								0
–	(France) David Dussau	Ret	Ret									0
–	(Brazil) Sergio Paese		Ret	DNQ	Ret							0
–	(Brazil) Alexandre de Andrade	Ret										0
–	(Argentina) Norberto Fontana								Ret			0
Pos	Driver	NÜR (Germany)	PAU (France)	PER (Italy)	HOC (Germany)	SIL (United Kingdom)	SPA (Belgium)	MAG (France)	EST (Portugal)	MUG (Italy)	HOC (Germany)	Points

Colour	Result
Gold	Winner
Silver	Second place
Bronze	Third place
Green	Points classification
Blue	Non-points classification
Blue	Non-classified finish (NC)
Purple	Retired, not classified (Ret)
Red	Did not qualify (DNQ)
Red	Did not pre-qualify (DNPQ)
Black	Disqualified (DSQ)
White	Did not start (DNS)
White	Withdrew (WD)
White	Race cancelled (C)
Blank	Did not practice (DNP)
Blank	Did not arrive (DNA)
Blank	Excluded (EX)

**Bold** – Pole
Italics – Fastest lap

=== Notes ===
- All drivers used Lola T96/50 chassis, with Zytek-Judd engines, and Avon tyres.
- Kenny Bräck was disqualified from first place from the second race at Hockenheim for dangerous driving.
- Laurent Redon was disqualified from the race at Estoril due to taking the wrong position on the grid.
- Thomas Biagi was disqualified from the first race at Hockenheim for ignoring a drive-through penalty.

== Complete overview ==
first column of every race	10	= grid position

second column of every race	10	= race result

R22=retired, but classified R=retired NC=not classified NS=did not start NQ=did not qualify DIS(1)=disqualified after finishing as winner 17E=grid position, but started from the end of the grid

Place	Name	Team	NÜR (Germany)		PAU (France)		PER (Italy)		HOC (Germany)		SIL (United Kingdom)		SPA (Belgium)		MAG (France)		EST (Portugal)		MUG (Italy)		HOC (Germany)
1	(Germany) Jörg Müller	RSM Marko	4	2	2	1	2	2	4	2	5	R	4	1	5	3	1	2	4	2	1	R
2	(Sweden) Kenny Bräck	SuperNova Racing	1	1	3	2	12	R	1	1	1	1	5	5	2	2	4	3	3	3	2	DIS(1)
3	(Belgium) Marc Goossens	Team Astromega	15	R	10	R	1	1	2	R	14	16	3	2	1	1	6	4	2	6	8	R
4	(Brazil) Ricardo Zonta	Draco Engineering	9	R	13	3	3	R	5	6	4	3	12	9	17	R	3	1	1	1	12	11
5	(Brazil) Marcos Gueiros	SuperNova Racing	2	3	5	R	8	4	3	3	6	4	6	15	8	R	5	R	6	17	6	2
6	(Denmark) Tom Kristensen	Shannon Racing	5	4	1	R	-	-
6	(Denmark) Tom Kristensen	Edenbridge Racing							13	5	2	2	1	3	-	-	-	-	5	4	3	R
	(France) Christophe Tinseau	Apomatox	12	8	6	R	4	3	6	4	8	6	8	6	14	9	18	11	13	11	4	1
8	(Brazil) Cristiano da Matta	Pacific Racing	10	9	12	4	6	5	9	R	3	R	10	10	12	5	9	7	10	20	5	R
	(France) Laurent Rédon	DAMS	3	6	4	R	9	10	7	R	10	R	13	12	7	4	7	R	8	8	7	4
10	(Italy) Christian Pescatori	Durango Équipe	19	10	7	R	15	R	14	9	7	5	2	4	6	R	2	R	14	R	10	R
	(Austria) Oliver Tichy	RSM Marko	25	11	25	NQ	11	6	11	R	11	R	7	8	3	R	8	R	12	7	11	3
12	(Italy) Thomas Biagi	Autosport Racing	11	R	24	NQ	19	8	16	R	-	-	25	NQ	9	6	11	6	7	5	16	7
13	(Portugal) Pedro Couceiro	Madgwick International	7	5	16	R	16	7	17	R	12	R	16	13	-	-
13	(Portugal) Pedro Couceiro	Edenbridge Racing															16	8	20	15	17	R
	(France) Patrick Lemarié	Pacific Racing	20	12	19	5	21	13	21	10	15	8	20	R	13	8	20	15	18	R	9	8
	(Italy) Fabrizio Gollin	Durango Équipe	16	R	21	10	14	9	8	R	20	9	11	11	16	R	13	5	11	R22	25	NQ
	(United States) Elton Julian	Nordic Racing	8	13	11	NS	5	R	18	R	9	7	15	14	20	12	22	NC	21	14	13	5
17	(Italy) Luca Rangoni	Shannon Racing	-	-	18	6	-	-	-	-	-	-	-	-	-	-	-	-	-	-	-	-
	(France) Cyrille Sauvage	Apomatox	22	R	20	7	10	R	12	7	16	10	9	7	10	R	14	13	17	12	19	6
-	(France) Jean-Philippe Belloc	DAMS	6	7	14	9	20	R	10	8	22	17	14	20	4	R	10	14	16	9	14	R
-	(France) Guillaume Gomez	Team Astromega	14	R	9	NS	17E	12	19	11	13	12	19	18	11	7	12	9	15	10	-	-
-	(Japan) Akira Iida	Nordic Racing	23	14	17	8	18	11	23	12	24	13	18	R	22	14	23	12	23	18	18	9
-	(Argentina) Gastón Mazzacane	Auto Sport Racing	13	R	23	NQ	7	14	15	R	18	11	21	19	15	R	17	10	9	R	20	R
-	(South Africa) Stephen Watson	Alpha Plus	18	R	15	R	13	R	20	R	19	18	17	16	18	11	15	R	22	16	21	10
-	(Sweden) Carl Rosenblad	Alpha Plus	26	R	27	NQ	23	R	24	13	23	19	23	R	21	13	24	R	24	19	22	12
-	(Argentina) Esteban Tuero	Draco Engineering	-	-	-	-	-	-	-	-	21	14	22	17	19	10	21	R	19	13	15	R
-	(United Kingdom) James Taylor	Salisbury Engineering	-	-	-	-	-	-	-	-	25	R	24	R	23	15	25	R	26	21	24	R
-	(United Kingdom) Steve Arnold	Edenbridge Racing	-	-	-	-	-	-	-	-	17	15	-	-	-	-	-	-	-	-	-	-
-	(France) Marc Rostan	Madgwick International	-	-	-	-	-	-	-	-	-	-	-	-	-	-	-	-	25	23	23	R
-	(Sweden) Peter Olsson	Edenbridge Racing	21	R	26	NQ	22	R	-	-	-	-	-	-	-	-	-	-	-	-	-	-
-	(Brazil) Sergio Paese	Draco Engineering	-	-	22	R	24	NQ	22	R	-	-	-	-	-	-	-	-	-	-	-	-
-	(France) David Dussau	Edenbridge Racing	17	R	8	R	-	-	-	-	-	-	-	-	-	-	-	-	-	-	-	-
-	(Brazil) Alexandre de Andrade	Draco Engineering	24	R	-	-	-	-	-	-	-	-	-	-	-	-	-	-	-	-	-	-
-	(Argentina) Norberto Fontana	Edenbridge Racing	-	-	-	-	-	-	-	-	-	-	-	-	-	-	19	R	-	-	-	-
