= 2004 Euro Formula 3000 Series =

The 2004 Superfund Euro Formula 3000 Series was contested over 10 rounds. 10 different teams and 25 different drivers competed. All teams raced with the Lola B99/50-Zytek chassis/engine combination.

The scoring system was 10-6-4-3-2-1 points awarded to the first six finishers.

== Driver and Team Lineup ==
Team	No.	Driver	Rounds
(Italy) Draco Junior Team	1	(Netherlands) Nicky Pastorelli	All
(Italy) Draco Junior Team	2	(Italy) Fausto Ippoliti	All
(Italy) ADM Motorsport	3	(Austria) Norbert Siedler	All
(Italy) ADM Motorsport	4	(Brazil) Allam Khodair	All
(Italy) ADM Motorsport	34	(Italy) Gianni Giudici	9-10
(Italy) GP Racing	5	(Italy) Fabrizio Del Monte	All
(Italy) GP Racing	6	(Belgium) Maxime Hodencq	All
(Italy) GP Racing	20	(Thailand) Tor Graves	All
(Italy) Traini Corse	7	(Italy) Matteo Santoponte	1-5
(Italy) Traini Corse	7	(Brazil) Christiano Rocha	6
(Italy) Traini Corse	7	(Italy) Matteo Meneghello	8
(Italy) Traini Corse	8	(Austria) Mathias Lauda	1, 3-6, 8-10
(Italy) Scuderia Famà	9	(Belgium) Loic Deman	1-6, 8-10
(Italy) Scuderia Famà	10	(Brazil) Christiano Rocha	5
(Italy) Scuderia Famà	10	(France) Jean de Pourtales	6-10
(United Kingdom) John Village Automotive	11	(Czech Republic) Tomas Kostka	1
(United Kingdom) John Village Automotive	11	(United Kingdom) Alex Lloyd	4-10
(United Kingdom) John Village Automotive	12	(New Zealand) Jonny Reid	All
(Italy) Euronova Racing	14	(Italy) Edoardo Bisconcin	1-4
(Italy) Euronova Racing	14	(Russia) Vitaly Petrov	6
(Italy) Euronova Racing	14	(Brazil) Christiano Rocha	8
(Italy) Euronova Racing	14	(Italy) Luca Filippi	9-10
(Italy) Euronova Racing	15	(Austria) Bernhard Auinger	All
(Italy) Power Tech	16	(Italy) Giacomo Ricci	1-4
(Italy) Power Tech	17	(Spain) Rafael Sarandeses	2-3
(Austria) Zele Racing	18	(Brazil) Christiano Rocha	1-4
(Austria) Zele Racing	19	(Germany) Sven Heidfeld	1-2
(Russia) NBC Group	21	(Russia) Sergey Zlobin	5

== Calendar ==
Round	Circuit/Location	Date	Laps	Distance	Time	Speed
1	(Czech Republic) Masaryk Circuit, Brno	2 May	25	5.403=135.075 km	0'48:16.727	174.437 km/h
2	(Portugal) Autódromo do Estoril	30 May	36	4.183=150.588 km	0'56:37.594	159.559 km/h
3	(Spain) Circuito Permanente de Jerez	6 June	34	4.429=150.586 km	0'59:35.497	151.584 km/h
4	(Italy) Autodromo Nazionale Monza	27 June	26	5.793=150.618 km	0'44:38.955	202.402 km/h
5	(Belgium) Circuit de Spa-Francorchamps	18 July	22	6.973=153.406 km	0'48:09.141	191.233 km/h
6	(United Kingdom) Donington Park	29 August	19+24	3.149=135.407 km	0'52:27.738	154.862 km/h
7	(France) Dijon-Prenois	12 September	38	3.886=147.668 km	0'47:53.396	190.437 km/h
8	(Belgium) Zolder	19 September	38	4.184=158.992 km	0'56:34.171	160.291 km/h
9	(Germany) Nürburgring	30 October	42	3.692=155.064 km	0'58:46.799	155.582 km/h
10	(Germany) Nürburgring	31 October	42	3.692=155.064 km	1'01:50.452	147.881 km/h

== Results ==
Round	Circuit/Location	Pole position	Fastest lap	Winner	Winning team
1	(Czech Republic) Masaryk Circuit, Brno	(Italy) Fabrizio Del Monte	(Italy) Fabrizio Del Monte	(Italy) Fabrizio Del Monte	(Italy) GP Racing
2	(Portugal) Autódromo do Estoril	(Austria) Norbert Siedler	(Austria) Norbert Siedler	(Italy) Fabrizio Del Monte	(Italy) GP Racing
3	(Spain) Circuito Permanente de Jerez	(Austria) Norbert Siedler	(Italy) Fabrizio Del Monte	(Italy) Fabrizio Del Monte	(Italy) GP Racing
4	(Italy) Autodromo Nazionale Monza	(Austria) Mathias Lauda	(Brazil) Christiano Rocha	(Netherlands) Nicky Pastorelli	(Italy) Draco Junior Team
5	(Belgium) Circuit de Spa-Francorchamps	(Austria) Norbert Siedler	(Netherlands) Nicky Pastorelli	(Austria) Bernhard Auinger	(Italy) Euronova Racing
6	(United Kingdom) Donington Park	(United Kingdom) Alex Lloyd	(United Kingdom) Alex Lloyd	(New Zealand) Jonny Reid	(United Kingdom) John Village Automotive
7	(France) Dijon-Prenois	(United Kingdom) Alex Lloyd	(United Kingdom) Alex Lloyd	(United Kingdom) Alex Lloyd	(United Kingdom) John Village Automotive
8	(Belgium) Zolder	(Austria) Norbert Siedler	(Austria) Norbert Siedler	(Austria) Norbert Siedler	(Italy) ADM Motorsport
9	(Germany) Nürburgring	(Austria) Norbert Siedler	(Austria) Bernhard Auinger	(Austria) Norbert Siedler	(Italy) ADM Motorsport
10	(Germany) Nürburgring	(Austria) Norbert Siedler	(Netherlands) Nicky Pastorelli	(Netherlands) Nicky Pastorelli	(Italy) Draco Junior Team

== Drivers' Championship ==
Pos	Driver	BRN (Czech Republic)	EST (Portugal)	JER (Spain)	MNZ (Italy)	SPA (Belgium)	DON (United Kingdom)	DIJ (France)	ZOL (Belgium)	NÜR1 (Germany)	NÜR2 (Germany)	Pts
1	(Netherlands) Nicky Pastorelli	3	2	6	1	2	5	4	Ret	3	1	46
2	(Italy) Fabrizio Del Monte	1	1	1	3	3	Ret	3	5	6	Ret	45
3	(Austria) Norbert Siedler	2	4	Ret	7	5	2	Ret	1	1	Ret	37
4	(New Zealand) Jonny Reid	7	Ret	3	Ret	6	1	2	2	2	5	35
5	(Austria) Bernhard Auinger	4	3	7	Ret	1	4	6	Ret	5	4	26
6	(United Kingdom) Alex Lloyd				Ret	4	Ret	1	Ret	Ret	2	19
7	(Italy) Fausto Ippoliti	9	6	5	4	7	6	5	6	4	3	17
8	(Brazil) Christiano Rocha	6	Ret	Ret	2	DNS	3		3			15
9	(Austria) Mathias Lauda	Ret		2	Ret	Ret	7		4	7	Ret	9
10	(Italy) 'Babalus'	5	Ret	4	5	DNS						7
11	(Belgium) Maxime Hodencq	12	5	DSQ	6	8	Ret	Ret	Ret	8	Ret	3
12	(Brazil) Allam Khodair	Ret	10	9†	Ret	9	Ret	Ret	Ret	NC	6	1
13	(France) Jean de Pourtales						8	7	Ret	Ret	7	0
14	(Italy) Giacomo Ricci	10	7	Ret	8							0
15	(Italy) Matteo Meneghello								7			0
16	(Thailand) Tor Graves	Ret	8	Ret	Ret	10	Ret	8	8	Ret	Ret	0
17	(Germany) Sven Heidfeld	8	Ret									0
18	(Belgium) Loic Deman	14	Ret	Ret	Ret	11	9		9	9	DNS	0
19	(Spain) Rafael Sarandeses		9	Ret								0
20	(Italy) Luca Filippi									10†	Ret	0
21	(Czech Republic) Tomas Kostka	11										0
22	(Italy) Edoardo Bisconcin	13	Ret	DNQ	Ret							0
	(Italy) Gianni Giudici									Ret	Ret	0
	(Russia) Vitaly Petrov						Ret					0
	(Russia) Sergey Zlobin					Ret						0
Pos	Driver	BRN (Czech Republic)	EST (Portugal)	JER (Spain)	MNZ (Italy)	SPA (Belgium)	DON (United Kingdom)	DIJ (France)	ZOL (Belgium)	NÜR1 (Germany)	NÜR2 (Germany)	Pts

Colour	Result
Gold	Winner
Silver	Second place
Bronze	Third place
Green	Points classification
Blue	Non-points classification
Blue	Non-classified finish (NC)
Purple	Retired, not classified (Ret)
Red	Did not qualify (DNQ)
Red	Did not pre-qualify (DNPQ)
Black	Disqualified (DSQ)
White	Did not start (DNS)
White	Withdrew (WD)
White	Race cancelled (C)
Blank	Did not practice (DNP)
Blank	Did not arrive (DNA)
Blank	Excluded (EX)

== Teams Championship ==
Pos	Team	BRN (Czech Republic)	EST (Portugal)	JER (Spain)	MNZ (Italy)	SPA (Belgium)	DON (United Kingdom)	DIJ (France)	ZOL (Belgium)	NÜR1 (Germany)	NÜR2 (Germany)	Pts
1	(Italy) Draco Junior Team	3	2	6	1	2	5	4	Ret	3	1	63
1	(Italy) Draco Junior Team	9	6	5	4	7	6	5	6	4	3	63
2	(United Kingdom) John Village Automotive	11			Ret	4	Ret	1	Ret	Ret	2	56
2	(United Kingdom) John Village Automotive	7	Ret	3	Ret	6	1	2	2	2	5	56
3	(Italy) GP Racing	1	1	1	3	3	Ret	3	5	6	Ret	48
3	(Italy) GP Racing	12	5	8†	6	8	Ret	Ret	Ret	8	Ret	48
4	(Italy) ADM Motorsport	2	4	Ret	7	5	2	Ret	1	1	Ret	38
4	(Italy) ADM Motorsport	Ret	10	9†	Ret	9	Ret	Ret	Ret	NC	6	38
5	(Italy) Euronova Racing	13	Ret	DNQ	Ret		Ret		3	10†	Ret	30
5	(Italy) Euronova Racing	4	3	7	Ret	1	4	6	Ret	5	4	30
6	(Italy) Traini Corse	5	Ret	4	5	DNS	3		7			20
6	(Italy) Traini Corse	Ret		2	Ret	Ret	7		4	7	Ret	20
7	(Austria) Zele Racing	6	Ret	Ret	2							7
7	(Austria) Zele Racing	8	Ret									7
8	(Italy) Scuderia Famà	14	Ret	Ret	Ret	11	9		9	9	DNS	0
8	(Italy) Scuderia Famà					DNS	8	7	Ret	Ret	7	0
9	(Italy) Power Tech	10	7	Ret	8							0
9	(Italy) Power Tech		9	Ret								0
10	(Russia) NBC Group					Ret						0
Pos	Team	BRN (Czech Republic)	EST (Portugal)	JER (Spain)	MNZ (Italy)	SPA (Belgium)	DON (United Kingdom)	DIJ (France)	ZOL (Belgium)	NÜR1 (Germany)	NÜR2 (Germany)	Pts

Colour	Result
Gold	Winner
Silver	Second place
Bronze	Third place
Green	Points classification
Blue	Non-points classification
Blue	Non-classified finish (NC)
Purple	Retired, not classified (Ret)
Red	Did not qualify (DNQ)
Red	Did not pre-qualify (DNPQ)
Black	Disqualified (DSQ)
White	Did not start (DNS)
White	Withdrew (WD)
White	Race cancelled (C)
Blank	Did not practice (DNP)
Blank	Did not arrive (DNA)
Blank	Excluded (EX)
