= Draco Racing =

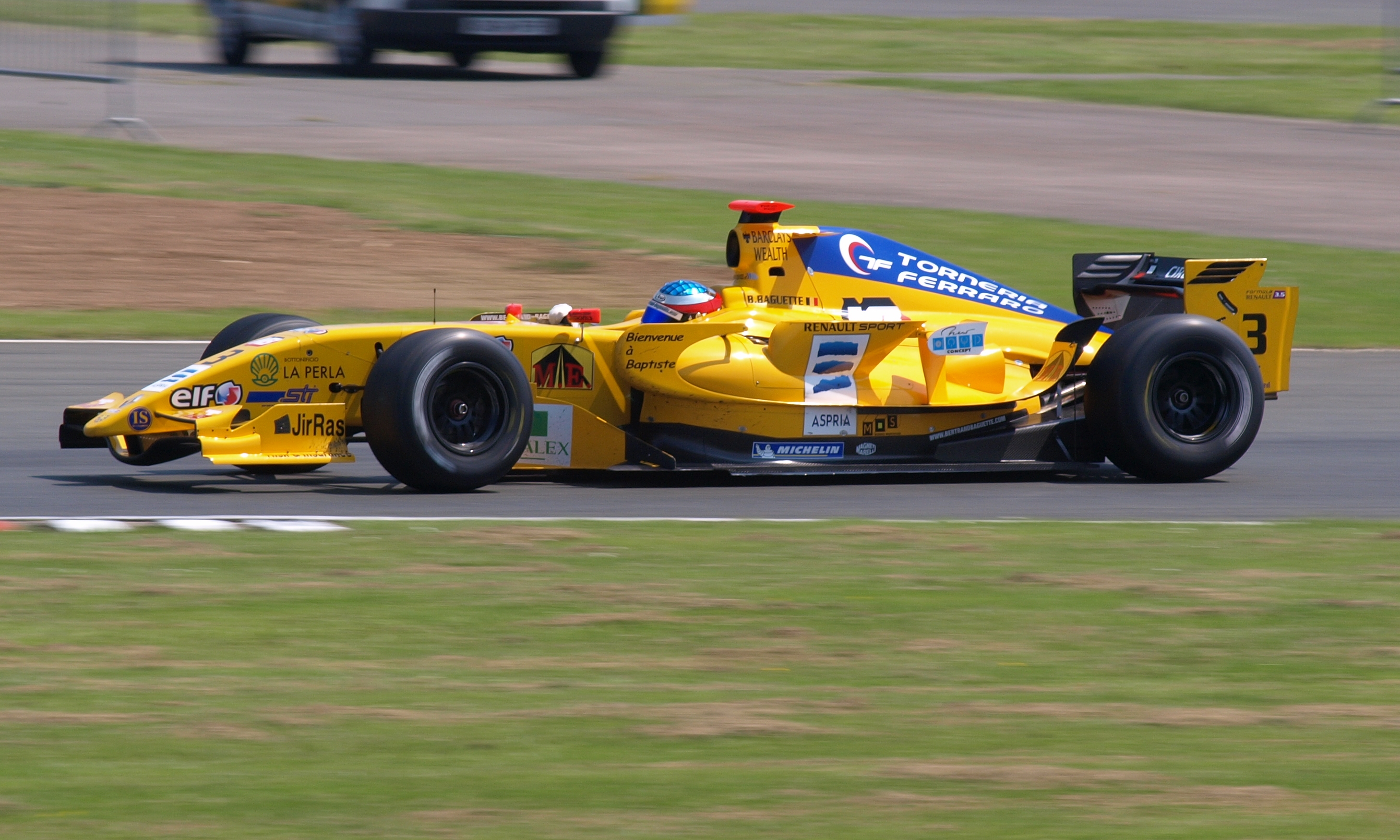
- Founded: 1989
- Founder(s): Adriano Morini; Nadia Morini
- Former series: Formula Renault 3.5 Series; Opel Lotus Euroseries; International Formula 3000; Euro Formula 3000
- Teams' Championships: Euro Formula 3000: 2001, 2003, 2004; 3000 Pro Series: 2005; Formula Renault 3.5 Series: 2009
- Drivers' Championships: Opel Lotus Euroseries: 1990: Rubens Barrichello; 1991: Pedro Lamy; 1993: Patrick Crinelli; 1994: Marco Campos; Euro Formula 3000: 2001: Felipe Massa; 2003: Augusto Farfus; 2004: Nicky Pastorelli; Formula Renault 3.5 Series: 2009: Bertrand Baguette

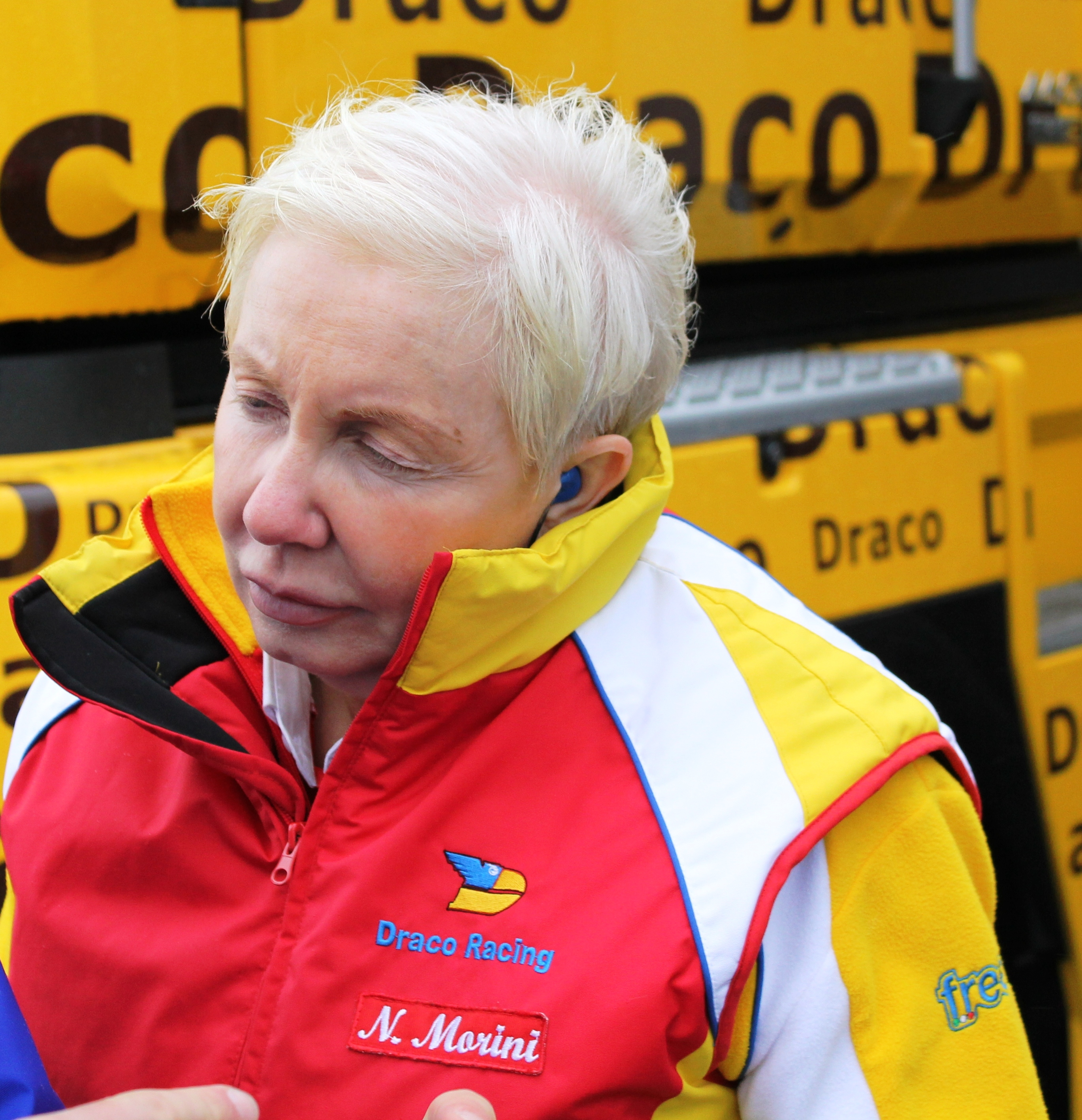
Team Principal Nadia Morini in 2011

International Draco Racing was a motorsport team. It was most well known for operating in the World Series by Renault, but had also taken part in Formula Opel Lotus, International Formula 3000 and Euro Formula 3000.

== Career ==
=== Formula Opel Lotus Euroseries ===
Draco was founded in 1989 by Adriano and Nadia Morini, and entered the Formula Opel Lotus Euroseries. In its first year, the Italian takes Brazilian driver Eduar Neto to second place in F. Opel, with five wins. The team continued to be one of the most competitive in the series for the following years, winning the F. Opel championship in 1990 with Rubens Barrichello, 1991 with Pedro Lamy, 1993 with Patrick Crinelli and 1994 with Marco Campos (in 1992, Gualter Salles was second).

=== International Formula 3000 ===
Draco stayed in Formula Opel until the championship's demise in 1996, but the year before Adriano Morini took his team to Formula 3000, creating the outfit specifically for Marco Campos. Morini took a gamble on the Brazilian driver's talent, but he ultimately lost it when 18-year-old Campos died in the race at Magny-Cours. Draco was never so successful in F3000, even with drivers such as Ricardo Zonta (in 1996) and Bruno Junqueira (in 1998) and left the series after the 1999 season.

=== Euro Formula 3000 ===
In 2000, Draco moved down to the Italian F3000 Championship (now Euro 3000), for older 1996 cars. This proved to be the wisest move, as Felipe Massa completely dominated the series in 2001, taking the championship title, a performance repeated in 2003 with Augusto Farfus and 2004 with Nicky Pastorelli.

=== Formula Renault 3.5 Series ===
In 2005, Draco changed series, again, to the World Series by Renault, where their lead drivers Pastor Maldonado and Miloš Pavlović finished third in the 2006 and 2007 seasons. In 2008 the drivers was Bertrand Baguette and Marco Barba. In 2009 the Draco Team won the Formula Renault 3.5 Championship with the Team Title and the Driver Title with Bertrand Baguette. Following funding issues midway through the 2015 Formula Renault 3.5 Series season, the team closed down at the end of the year.

=== Complete Formula Renault 3.5 Series results ===
(key) (results in bold indicate pole position; results in italics indicate fastest lap)

Year	Drivers	1	2	3	4	5	6	7	8	9	10	11	12	13	14	15	16	17	Pts.	WCC
2005		ZOL	ZOL	MON	VAL	VAL	BUG	BUG	BIL	BIL	OSC	OSC	DON	DON	EST	EST	MNZ	MNZ	**2nd**	**167**
2005	(Germany) Markus Winkelhock	Ret	3	DNS	11	12	**1**	5	Ret	7	Ret	3	5	1	4	2	3	1	**2nd**	**167**
2005	(San Marino) Christian Montanari	7	DNS	**1**	12	15	12	6	6	10	11	17	2	15	8	5	12	9	**2nd**	**167**
2006		ZOL	ZOL	MON	IST	IST	MIS	MIS	SPA	SPA	NÜR	NÜR	DON	DON	BUG	BUG	CAT	CAT	**2nd**	**132**
2006	(Venezuela) Pastor Maldonado	8	3	1	11	**Ret**	**DSQ**	Ret	**1**	**2**	6	**22**	8	Ret	Ret	1	10	2	**2nd**	**132**
2006	(Czech Republic) Tomas Kostka	14	14	8	Ret	15	20	Ret	20	9	Ret	17							**2nd**	**132**
2006	(Serbia) Miloš Pavlović												3	8	2	Ret	Ret	18	**2nd**	**132**
2007		MNZ	MNZ	NÜR	NÜR	MON	HUN	HUN	SPA	SPA	DON	DON	MAG	MAG	EST	EST	CAT	CAT	**2nd**	**160**
2007	(Serbia) Miloš Pavlović	6	2	15	24	4	7	2	7	1	11	Ret	4	Ret	9	1	4	4	**2nd**	**160**
2007	(Spain) Álvaro Barba	Ret	Ret	4	5	19	Ret	Ret	Ret	17	1	Ret	12	11	3	6	18	Ret	**2nd**	**160**
2008		MNZ	MNZ	SPA	SPA	MON	SIL	SIL	HUN	HUN	NÜR	NÜR	BUG	BUG	EST	EST	CAT	CAT	6th	93
2008	(Belgium) Bertrand Baguette	Ret	Ret	1	11	5	6	16	4	4	5	5	Ret	16	Ret	4	Ret	4	6th	93
2008	(Spain) Marco Barba	12	8	Ret	20	Ret	12	7	10	7	Ret	10	10	8	6	10	16	Ret	6th	93
2009		CAT	CAT	SPA	SPA	MON	HUN	HUN	SIL	SIL	BUG	BUG	ALG	ALG	NÜR	NÜR	ALC	ALC	**1st**	**205**
2009	(Belgium) Bertrand Baguette	2	Ret	2	**2**	5	3	6	**8**	5	1	1	2	5	1	5	1	1	**1st**	**205**
2009	(Spain) Marco Barba	Ret	Ret	**7**	12	16	2	2	10	10	**5**	7	16	11	8	7	14	6	**1st**	**205**
2010		ALC	ALC	SPA	SPA	MON	BRN	BRN	MAG	MAG	HUN	HUN	HOC	HOC	SIL	SIL	CAT	CAT	7th	71
2010	(France) Nathanaël Berthon	Ret	3	Ret	10	Ret	8	2	9	1	Ret	13	9	3	Ret	Ret	6	12	7th	71
2010	(Colombia) Omar Leal	Ret	Ret	11	12	16	4	13	Ret	19	Ret	16	13	9	Ret	10	Ret	Ret	7th	71
2011		ALC	ALC	SPA	SPA	MNZ	MNZ	MON	NÜR	NÜR	HUN	HUN	SIL	SIL	LEC	LEC	CAT	CAT	12th	26
2011	(Monaco) Stéphane Richelmi	16	Ret	17	Ret	7	15	16	13	13	15	20	19	20	17	13	Ret	Ret	12th	26
2011	(Brazil) André Negrão	14	9	DNS	11	10	10	Ret	6	12	20	Ret	Ret	16	15	6			12th	26
2011	(France) Adrien Tambay																DNS	Ret	12th	26
2012		ALC	ALC	MON	SPA	SPA	NÜR	NÜR	MOS	MOS	SIL	SIL	HUN	HUN	LEC	LEC	CAT	CAT	8th	114
2012	(Switzerland) Nico Müller	Ret	Ret	5	5	4	2	Ret	8	Ret	Ret	7	6	Ret	8	7	12	15	8th	114
2012	(Brazil) André Negrão	8	10	Ret	12	12	19	3	13	4	Ret	16	15	Ret	Ret	22	14	8	8th	114

== Complete former series results ==
=== 3000 Pro Series ===
3000 Pro Series results
Year	Car	Drivers	Races	Wins	Poles	F.L.	Points	D.C.	T.C.
2005	Lola B99/50–Zytek	(Germany) Timo Lienemann	8	2	0		41	3rd	1st
2005	Lola B99/50–Zytek	(Italy) Alessandro Bonetti	8	1	0		39	4th	1st

=== Italian/Euro Formula 3000 ===
Italian/Euro Formula 3000 results
Year	Car	Drivers	Races	Wins	Poles	F.L.	Points	D.C.	T.C.
1999	Lola T96/50-Zytek	(Italy) Oliver Martini	1	0	0	0	0	14th^{1}	NC
1999	Lola T96/50-Zytek	(Austria) Walter Thimmler	1	0	0	0	0	NC	NC
2000	Lola T96/50-Zytek	(Brazil) Rodrigo Sperafico	8	0	1	0	22	4th	5th
2000	Lola T96/50-Zytek	(Brazil) Leonardo Nienkötter	8	0	0	0	0	NC	5th
2001	Lola T96/50-Zytek	(Brazil) Lucas Vacis	8	0	0	0	1	13th	1st
2001	Lola T96/50-Zytek	(Brazil) Felipe Massa	8	6	6	5	60	1st	1st
2002	Lola B99/50-Zytek	(Brazil) Augusto Farfus	9	0	0	0	8	9th	5th
2002	Lola B99/50-Zytek	(Italy) Matteo Grassotto	9	0	0	0	12	7th	5th
2003	Lola B99/50-Zytek	(Brazil) Augusto Farfus	9	4	5	3	60	1st	1st
2003	Lola B99/50-Zytek	(Germany) Sven Heidfeld	9	0	0	0	4	11th	1st
2004	Lola B99/50-Zytek	(Netherlands) Nicky Pastorelli	10	2	0	1	46	1st	1st
2004	Lola B99/50-Zytek	(Italy) Fausto Ippoliti	10	0	0	0	17	7th	1st

=== International Formula 3000 ===
Year	Car	Drivers	Races	Wins	Poles	F.L.	Points	D.C.	T.C.
1995	Lola-Cosworth	(Brazil) Marco Campos	8	0	0	0	3	13th	9th
1996	Lola T96/50-Zytek Judd	(Brazil) Ricardo Zonta	10	2	1	2	27	4th	4th
1996	Lola T96/50-Zytek Judd	(Brazil) Alexandre de Andrade	1	0	0	0	0	NC	4th
1996	Lola T96/50-Zytek Judd	(Brazil) Sergio Paese	2	0	0	0	0	NC	4th
1996	Lola T96/50-Zytek Judd	(Argentina) Esteban Tuero	6	0	0	0	0	24th	4th
1997	Lola T96/50-Zytek Judd	(France) Cyrille Sauvage	10	0	0	0	5	13th	8th
1997	Lola T96/50-Zytek Judd	(Portugal) Pedro Couceiro	9	0	0	0	6	11th	8th
1998	Lola T96/50-Zytek Judd	(Brazil) Bruno Junqueira	12	0	0	0	3	18th	15th
1998	Lola T96/50-Zytek Judd	(Italy) Giovanni Montanari	12	0	0	0	0	27th	15th
1999	Lola B99/50-Zytek	(France) Fabrice Walfisch	9	0	0	0	4	14th	11th
1999	Lola B99/50-Zytek	(Italy) Oliver Martini	3	0	0	0	8	NC	11th
1999	Lola B99/50-Zytek	(France) Cyrille Sauvage	1	0	0	0	0	NC^{2}	11th

Notes:

- 1. - Martini scored 3 points in 1 race for Sighinolfi Autoracing.
- 2. - Sauvage also entered in 4 races for Monaco Motorsport.

Achievements
Preceded by Tech 1 Racing	Formula Renault 3.5 Series Teams' Champion; 2009	Succeeded by Tech 1 Racing
