= Christophe Tinseau =

French racing driver

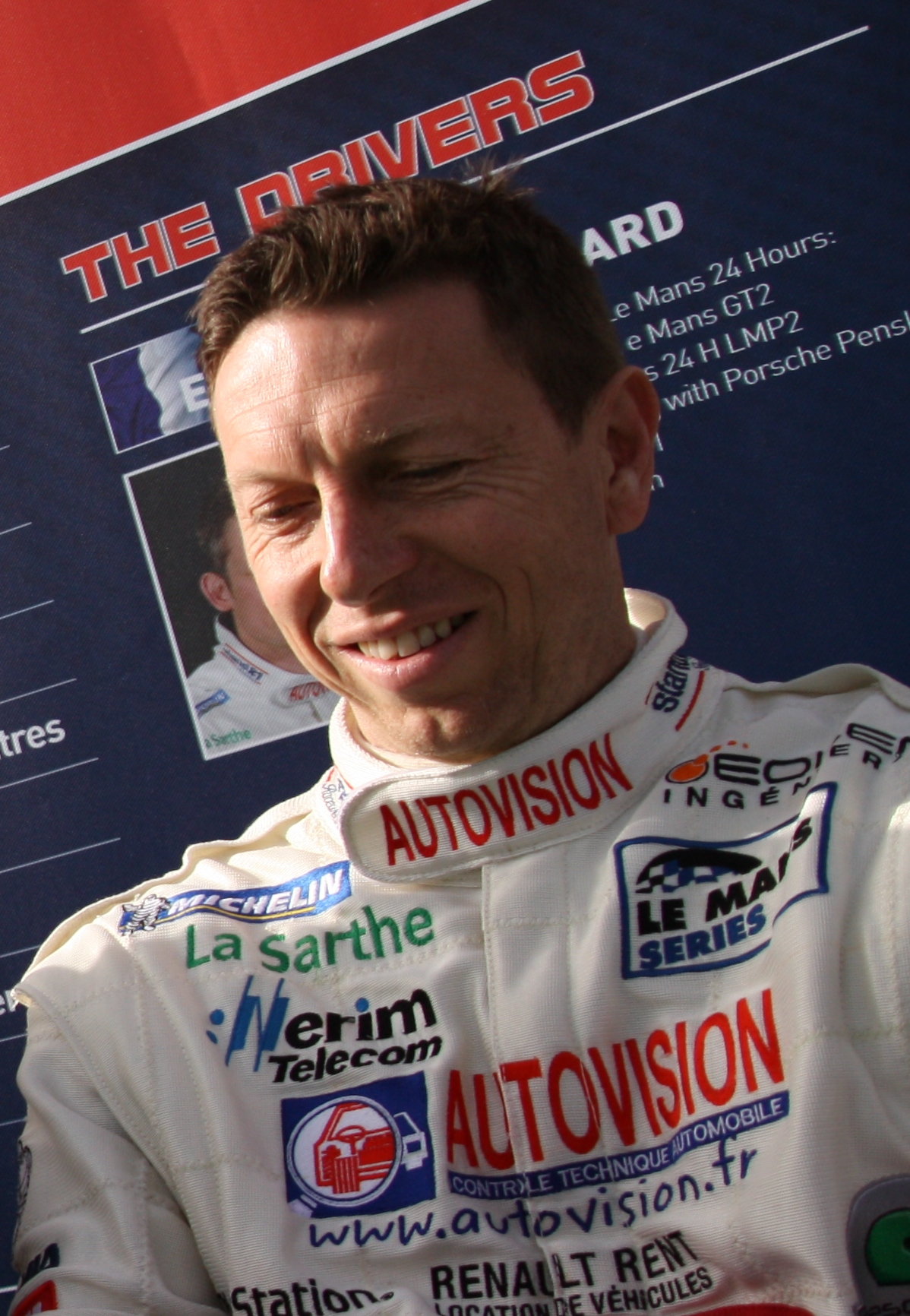
- Tinseau in 2011
- Nationality: (France) French
- Born: Christophe Raymond Jean Tinseau; 18 December 1969 (age 56) Orléans, France
- Categorisation: FIA Platinum (until 2013); FIA Gold (2014–)
24 Hours of Le Mans career
- Years: 1998–2003, 2007–2009, 2011–2012, 2016
- Teams: Panoz Motorsports; DAMS; Team Cadillac; Riley & Scott Racing; Pescarolo Sport; Thiriet by TDS Racing
- Best finish: 7th (2008)
- Class wins: 0

Christophe Raymond Jean Tinseau (born 18 December 1969) is a French racing driver from Orléans.

Tinseau began racing professionally in French Formula Renault in 1991. In 1992, he moved to French Formula Three, and in 1993, he placed fourth in that championship with two wins and finished tenth in the Macau Grand Prix. In 1994, he was the championship runner-up in French F3, and in 1995, he moved up to Formula 3000 where he finished 16th with seven race starts. In 1996, he improved to sixth in F3000, winning the season-ending race at Hockenheim.

In 1997, Tinseau raced in Indy Lights, but only managed an 11th place championship finish, ending up on the podium once at Circuit Trois-Rivières.

After the seeming decline in his open-wheel fortunes, Tinseau moved to sports cars for 1998, driving a Panoz Esperante GTR-1 for DAMS, making his 24 Hours of Le Mans debut. In 1999, still with DAMS, he piloted a Judd powered Lola B98/10 for and won two races in the Sports Racing World Cup. From 2000 to 2002, he drove the historic Cadillac Northstar LMP at Le Mans, finishing fifth in class in 2001.

Tinseau competed part-time in various series from 2003 to 2005, but returned to full-time racing in 2006, when he finished sixth in Porsche Carrera Cup France. He made six Le Mans Series starts and finished sixth at Le Mans for Pescarolo Sport in 2007. He continued with the team in 2008 and finished seventh at Le Mans and eighth in LMS points and continued with the team in 2009, finishing second in Le Mans Series.

In 2010, Tinseau competed in the NASCAR Whelen Euro Series, finishing eighth with one win.

In 2011, Tinseau returned to Le Mans Series with Pescarolo and finished fourth in the championship. In 2012, he competed in a handful of major endurance races, and since then has been largely retired. He has founded a racing school for ice racing.

== Racing record ==
=== Complete International Formula 3000 results ===
(key) (Races in bold indicate pole position; races in italics indicate fastest lap.)

Year	Entrant	Chassis	Engine	1	2	3	4	5	6	7	8	9	10	Pos.	Pts
1995	Mythos Racing	Reynard 95D	Zytek-Judd	SIL; 9	CAT; 6	PAU; Ret	PER; Ret	HOC; 7	SPA; 7	EST; 10	MAG; 14			16th	1
1996	Apomatox	Lola T96/50	Zytek-Judd	NÜR; 8	PAU; Ret	PER; 3	HOC; 4	SIL; 6	SPA; 6	MAG; 9	EST; 11	MUG; 11	HOC; 1	6th	18

=== Complete American Open Wheel racing results ===
(key)

==== Indy Lights ====
Year	Team	1	2	3	4	5	6	7	8	9	10	11	12	13	Rank	Points	Ref
1997	Conquest Racing	MIA; 25	LBH; 26	NAZ; 14	SAV; 12	STL; 12	MIL; 21	DET; 11	POR; 4	TOR; 5	TRO; 3	VAN; 18	LAG; 6	FON; 12	**11th**	**49**	

=== Complete FIA GT Championship results ===
(key) (Races in bold indicate pole position) (Races in italics indicate fastest lap)

Year	Team	Car	Class	1	2	3	4	5	6	7	8	9	10	11	Pos.	Pts
1998	DAMS	Panoz GTR-1	GT1	OSC	SIL	HOC	DIJ	HUN	SUZ; 5	DON	A1R; 7	HOM	LAG		24th	2
2001	Freisinger Motorsport	Porsche 911 GT3-RS	N-GT	MNZ	BRN	MAG	SIL	ZOL	HUN	SPA; Ret	A1R	NÜR	JAR	EST	NC	0

=== 24 Hours of Le Mans results ===
Year	Team	Co-Drivers	Car	Class	Laps	Pos.	Class Pos.
1998	(United States) Panoz Motorsports Inc. (France) DAMS	(France) Éric Bernard (United States) Johnny O'Connell	Panoz Esperante GTR-1	GT1	236	DNF	DNF
1999	(France) Team DAMS	(France) Franck Montagny (France) David Terrien	Lola B98/10-Judd	LMP	77	DNF	DNF
2000	(France) Team DAMS	(Belgium) Marc Goossens (Denmark) Kristian Kolby	Cadillac Northstar LMP	LMP900	4	DNF	DNF
2001	(France) DAMS	(South Africa) Wayne Taylor (Italy) Max Angelelli	Cadillac Northstar LMP01	LMP900	270	15th	5th
2002	(United States) Team Cadillac	(South Africa) Wayne Taylor (Italy) Max Angelelli	Cadillac Northstar LMP02	LMP900	345	9th	8th
2003	(United States) Riley & Scott Racing	(United States) Jim Matthews (Belgium) Marc Goossens	Riley & Scott Mk III C-Ford	LMP900	214	DNF	DNF
2007	(France) Pescarolo Sport	(Switzerland) Harold Primat (France) Benoît Tréluyer	Pescarolo 01-Judd	LMP1	325	13th	6th
2008	(France) Pescarolo Sport	(Switzerland) Harold Primat (France) Benoît Tréluyer	Pescarolo 01-Judd	LMP1	362	7th	7th
2009	(France) Pescarolo Sport	(France) Bruce Jouanny (Portugal) João Barbosa	Pescarolo 01-Judd	LMP1	368	8th	8th
2011	(France) Pescarolo Team	(France) Emmanuel Collard (France) Julien Jousse	Pescarolo 01-Judd	LMP1	305	DNF	DNF
2012	(France) Thiriet by TDS Racing	(France) Pierre Thiriet (Switzerland) Mathias Beche	Oreca 03-Nissan	LMP2	353	8th	**2nd**
2016	(France) SRT41 by OAK Racing	(France) Jean-Bernard Bouvet (France) Frédéric Sausset	Morgan LMP2-Nissan	CDNT	315	38th	N/A
