= Marco Campos =

Brazilian racing driver (1976–1995)

- Born: 24 February 1976; Curitiba, Brazil
- Died: 15 October 1995 (aged 19); Paris, France
- Cause of death: Auto racing accident
- Relatives: Júlio Campos (brother)

International Formula 3000
- Years active: 1995
- Teams: Draco Engineering
- Starts: 8
- Wins: 0
- Poles: 0
- Fastest laps: 0
- Best finish: 13th in 1995

Previous series
- 1994: Formula Opel Lotus Euroseries

Championship titles
- 1994: Formula Opel Lotus Euroseries

Marco Antônio Ferreira Campos (24 February 1976 – 15 October 1995) was a Brazilian racing driver. He died in an accident in a Formula 3000 race at the Circuit de Nevers Magny-Cours, making him the only driver to be fatally injured in the International Formula 3000 series.

== Career ==
Campos was a successful kart driver, winning the Panamerican championship in 1992 and 1993. In 1993 he also won the South American karting championship. Then in 1994 he went to drive in the European Formula Opel championship, winning the title in his first year for the Draco Junior Team.

His personal friend Mario-Alberto Bauér negotiated a deal for Marco to race for the WTS F3 Team of Michael Schumacher's personal manager Willi Weber as a team mate to Ralf Schumacher. But a Brazilian sponsor lured Marco into staying with the Draco as the team jumped a step up to the International Formula 3000 championship in 1995.

On board of the newcomer's Lola-Cosworth results were hard to come by in his rookie season and Marco's only points-finish was a fourth place in Enna.

== Death ==
Campos was killed in an accident at the season-ending race in Magny Cours. On the last lap of the season finale, on the straight before the Adelaide hairpin, his left front tyre collided with the right rear tyre of Thomas Biagi's car, and was launched into the air. His car flipped over, and Campos' head struck the top of the concrete retaining wall whilst flying upside-down. The accident resulted in severe skull fractures and massive head trauma, and put him into a deep coma. Campos died the following day at the Lariboisière Hospital in Paris, France.

Campos was 13th in the final Drivers' Championship standings in his only F3000 season.

== Other ==
Campos' brother, Júlio, went through karting and formula championships, winning the Skip Barber championship in 2001 in the USA and now competes in Brazil's Stock Car Brasil Championship.

== Racing record ==
=== Complete International Formula 3000 results ===
(key) (Races in bold indicate pole position; races in italics indicate fastest lap.)

Year	Entrant	Chassis	Engine	1	2	3	4	5	6	7	8	Pos	Points
1995	Draco Engineering	Lola	Cosworth	SIL; Ret	CAT; Ret	PAU; 13	PER; 4	HOC; Ret	SPA; 8	EST; 9	MAG; 10	13th	3

Sporting positions
Preceded by Patrick Crinelli	European Formula Opel Lotus; Drivers' Champion; 1994	Succeeded by Jason Watt
