= Marcos Gueiros =

Brazilian racing driver (born 1970)

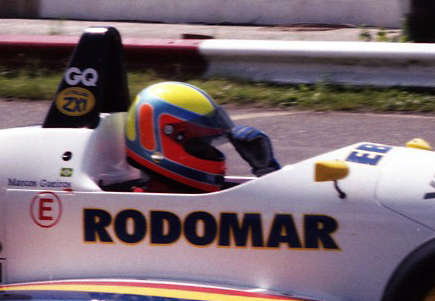
- Marcos Gueiros, Thruxton British F3 1994
- Nationality: (Brazil) Brazilian
- Born: January 16, 1970 (age 56) Belém, Pará
- Retired: 2001

Formula 3 Sudamericana
- Years active: 1990-1992; 2000-2001
- Teams: Cesário Fórmula; Avallone Motorsport
- Starts: 43
- Wins: 7
- Best finish: 1st in 1992

Previous series
- 2000-2001 1995-1996 1993-1994 1990-1993: Formula 3 Sudamericana; International Formula 3000; British Formula Three Championship; Formula 3 Sudamericana

Championship titles
- 1992 1991-1992: Formula 3 Sudamericana; Brazilian Formula Three Championship

Marcos Gueiros (born 16 January 1970 in Belém) is a Brazilian racing driver who has competed in the International Formula 3000 series. Gueiros has also raced in various Formula 3 championships in which he won three titles.

== Career history ==
Gueiros made his auto racing debut in 1990. He competed in five races of the Formula 3 Sudamericana in a Reynard 883. For 1991, Gueiros competed full-time in the championship in a Ralt RT32. This was a successful season resulting in four race wins and a second place in the championship standings. 1991 was also the year Gueiros won the Brazilian Formula Three Championship. The following year, he returned to both series, winning both championships.

After racing successes in his home country, Gueiros moved to Europe for the 1993 racing season. Gueiros was signed by Edenbridge Racing to drive one of their state-of-the-art Dallara F393's as of the sixth round of the British Formula Three championship. His season started slow but he ended with two top five finishes in the final four races. Gueiros returned to the championship the following year. He scored his first podium finish at Silverstone. He went on to score another podium at Silverstone near the end of the season. His consistent top-ten finishes landed him the sixth place in the championship. He was the second best Brazilian driver, just behind Ricardo Rosset. In both years, Gueiros also ran in the prestigious Masters of Formula 3. After failing to finish in the 1993 edition, the 1994 running of the race was noticeably more successful. He qualified thirteenth for the race but finished in tenth place.

For 1995, Gueiros was signed by Madgwick International to compete in the International Formula 3000. In a season marked by DNF's, he collected two points. At the Hockenheimring, Gueiros finished fifth thus scoring two points. The following season Gueiros was signed by Super Nova Racing alongside Kenny Bräck. Gueiros had a successful season. In the season opener at the Nürburgring, Gueiros finished third, behind Jörg Müller and Kenny Bräck. He repeated this performance at the Hockenheimring halfway through the season. He scored his best result at the Hockenheimring in the season finale. After starting sixth, Gueiros finished second. The Brazilian driver classified fifth in the season standings. After failing to secure a racing seat in Formula One or another season in Formula 3000, Gueiros returned to his home country.

After a sabbatical of four years, Gueiros returned to the track in the Formula 3 Sudamericana in 2000. Racing in the "Light" class, Gueiros won one race out of fourteen and finished sixth in the championship standings. He returned in the series for one race in 2001 after which he retired from professional racing.

== Motorsports results ==
=== Complete International Formula 3000 results ===
(key) (Races in bold indicate pole position) (Races in italics indicate fastest lap)

| Year | Entrant | 1 | 2 | 3 | 4 | 5 | 6 | 7 | 8 | 9 | 10 | DC | Points |
|---|---|---|---|---|---|---|---|---|---|---|---|---|---|
| 1995 | Madgwick International | SIL; Ret | CAT; Ret | PAU; Ret | PER; Ret | HOC; 5 | SPA; Ret | EST; Ret | MAG; 8 | | | **15th** | **2** |
| 1996 | Super Nova Racing | NÜR; 3 | PAU; Ret | PER; 4 | HOC; 3 | SIL; 4 | SPA; 15 | MAG; Ret | EST; Ret | MUG; 17 | HOC; 2 | 5th | 20 |
