= Pedro Couceiro =

Portuguese racing driver (born 1970)

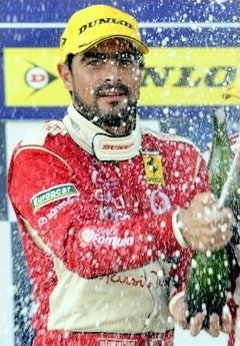
- Nationality: (Portugal) Portuguese
- Born: 23 March 1970 (age 56) Lobito - Angola

Pedro Couceiro (born 23 March 1970) is a Portuguese former racing driver. In the late 1970s, Couceiro became better known as a child singer and at 12 years old he started his career in Karting.

Couceiro is the current safety car driver in the FIA World Endurance Championship.

== Early years ==
Couceiro was born in Angola and remained there until 1974, when his parents moved to Portugal. Couceiro followed in the footsteps of his older brother Nuno in Karting and, helped by the funds that he earned with his successes as a singer, he bought his first Kart and started racing.

== Musical career ==
It is with his entrance to primary school that he realizes his musical talent. With only seven years old, he took up piano. In a selection to find six kids who would be able to substitute “Os Meninos Rabinas” – a very successful young group in the 70s – Pedro became one of the chosen ones for the “Os Traquinas” group. With this group he records three albums and gets to know one of Valentim de Carvalho’s producers, he then stars his career as a young singer. The dream of participating in the Gala Internacional dos Pequenos Cantores – the most important contest for children during the 70s/80s – come true when the discographic producer chooses him to compete in the contest, taking the songs “Eu já namoro” and “O meu Avôzinho”, composed by Carlos Paião. Between 1980 and 1983, he records four solo albums and established himself as one of the young successes of juvenile national music. Couceiro travels the country during there three years, performing in the most diverse stages and is a common presence in the most important television programs of that time. Around 1983 (when he was preparing his 5th album), the vocals deepening and the excess obligations as a singer, forced him to make some choices. At this phase, he abandons his musical career and start fully dedicating himself to Karting.

== Studies ==
Since his early life, he always wanted to follow his father’s footprints and become a Civil Engineer. His entry in Primary School was, without any doubt, one of the most important steps of his life. As a good pupil, the student life became harder right after taking up motorsports. However, his parents imposed that he would have to keep up the good results, and even with ups and downs, he was able to reconcile his to objectives: the sports; and the licentiate degree in Master Civil Engineering in the specialty of Vias of Communication and Transport in the Instituto Superior Técnico de Lisboa (in Lisbon). Additionally during his youth he also studied English in the British Council and got the First Certificate of English Language.

== Social activity ==
Outside his professional and competitive life, Pedro Couceiro has had intense activity in the social sphere with interventions in the most diverse areas. Undoubtedly, his most prominent role is as UNICEF Ambassador in Portugal UNICEF Goodwill Ambassador: a role he has been playing since 1995, having it shared since 2001 with the football player Luís Figo and more recently with the Fado singer Mariza and TV presenter Bárbara Guimarães. In the last recent years, he has managed to achieve two more of his dreams: in 2006 he became a father of a girl named Inês and in 2009 he launched his comic book biography under the title of - Sonho Sem Fim – (Endless Dream), along with the illustrator Rui Ricardo and writer Hugo de Jesus, with all profits reverting to the Portuguese institution Aldeias SOS - SOS Children's Villages International. At this point he claims to have achieved the stereotyped peak: Plant a tree, have a child and write a book. The pilot also has as occupation of the free time playing golf, video games and playing the piano. Already in 2016, he became father of a second girl, named Caetana, the fruit of his marriage with Mariana Gaspar, with whom he married in 2015.

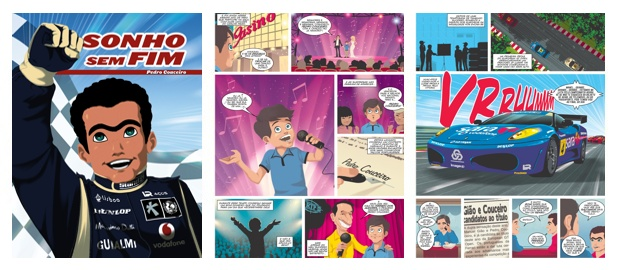

== MotorSport ==
=== Karting ===
It is with only 12 years old - July 1982 - that Pedro Couceiro participates in his first official competition of Karting. The event, organized by the ACP and called the "Volante de Prata" Trophy, was disputed by children between the ages of 12 and 17 and served to finally discover their true vocation and passion. There, he confronted more than 140 candidates and qualified with an excellent 18th place. A small accomplishment for his young age: he was the second youngest pilot of all the participants. Without any family history in the modality, he started having the support of his brother Nuno to start in this new adventure. With the creation in 1983 of the Junior Category, he begins to compete in the national championships. Three races later he won his first victory at the Cantanhede circuit, a track that is being played at a particularly difficult time: when his truck of support to the competition burns with the little material that had managed to buy to compete. It is worth the goodwill of the friends who helped him and allowed him to be on track two races later. In the end, the outcome could not be more positive: Vice-Champion Junior 1983: conquering the same result the following year. In the middle of 1985, he leveled up to Intercontinental Category A - the most prestigious of the modality – winning the Portuguese Cup in 1986, the following year he became Vice-Champion and in 1988 he conquered the third place in the final.

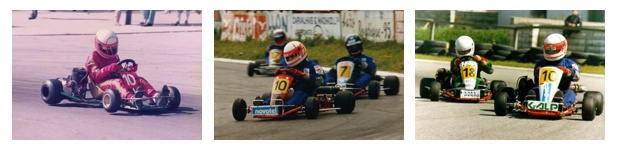

=== F.Ford ===
After nearly seven seasons in karting, Pedro Couceiro aims to climb one more step in his motorsport career. In 1989 he faces one of the most demanding championships of that time: the Portuguese Formula Ford National Championship. In the debut race in the single-seater he ends with a brilliant second place, however, despite being fighting for the title, a serious accident two races before the end of 89’s season, leave him bedridden for almost three weeks, which makes it impossible to get better results. He finished the year in sixth place. In 1990 after an internship in England, in the middle of the most competitive International Formula Ford Championship, he arrived to Portugal in a great shape. He immediately records two victories and systematically shines winning the much desired title of National Champion. This victory gave a strong boost to his career.

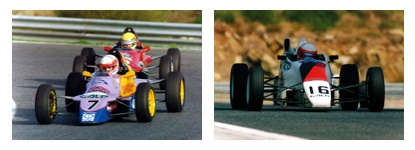

=== Internationalization and Professionalization ===
==== F.Opel ====
In spite of the many uncertainties, he decided to start in 1991 with the Formula Opel – GM Lotus European Championship: one of the most prestigious international championships to promote young talents of the time and that competed in the events of Formula 1. In the first half of the championship he regularly contested for a place in the Top Ten for, later, at the end of the season already fighting for the podium places. In 1992 he started the season with a victory and two podiums in consecutive races. However, halfway through the season, some disagreements with the team and consequent changes did not allow him to fight for the title. In that same year, he participates in the Nations Cup of the modality – teaming with Manuel Gião – a race in which they obtain the title of Nations Cup Vice-Champions. In 1993, and after not getting the money to jump to Formula 3, repeats the European Formula Opel. When it looks like he could fight for a great final result in the season, mechanical problems are a constant and leave him out of the title fight near the end of the season.

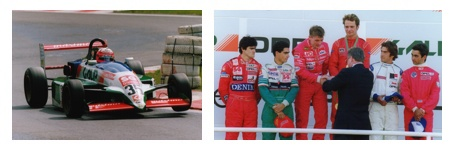

==== German & International F.3 ====
In 1994 enters the competitive German Formula 3 and distinguishes himself from others always with excellent results. Although he was not an official Opel driver that season - at times he was his best representative - even entering the title fight, with Fiat's driver: Jörg Müller and the official Opel drivers: Alexander Wurz and Ralf Schumacher. He gets five second places, eight Podiums, and ten places in the Top 5: which opened many doors for the next season's negotiations. In 1995 he remained in the same Championship despite switching from Opel to Fiat. He also has a year full of good results and stands out as being the best driver of the Italian brand. It is also in 1995 - at the steering wheel of an Alfa-Romeo 155 DTM - that he starts his debut in the touring cars, competing for the ITC event held at the Estoril circuit.

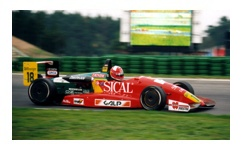

==== FIA International F.3000 ====
When in 1996 he finally made the leap to the F3000 International, the F1’s antechamber, he got a fifth place in his debut race, becoming part of the narrow batch of drivers who managed to score in their inaugural race. As expected, 1996 turned out to be a year of learning, with some good results, but also with many difficulties. In 1997 he remained in the championship with the intention of making the final assault on Formula 1. The season started with an excellent second place at the Silverstone / England circuit, but when it looked for a great season, not everything ended up running in the greatest way. Mechanical problems and some accidents take away the Portuguese driver’s protagonism and complicated his life with a view to a good result in the championship. However, still in the course of that year, he begins negotiations to enter F1, a fact that did not happen and that lead him to embark on his career in Tourism cars.

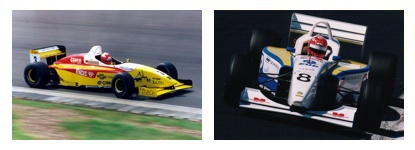

==== GT’s' ====
In 1998, he competed in the Porsche Supercup (the most competitive mono-brand championship in the world to date) where apart from the extreme competitiveness and the excellent level of the drivers, he was still able to continue to roll in front of the F1 teams, since all races were disputed in the same events as the “Master” discipline. After a first time of adaptation, very common for almost all the pilots coming from the Formulas, he began to enter regularly in the top 10. In 1999 he maintained himself in the same championship and began the year with a Pole Position and a second place in the Australian event taken place at the Melbourne circuit. He even leads the championship but once again, a wide range of accidents removed the Portuguese driver from the leading position. Stays in the Porsche Supercup for two more seasons. In 2001 he embraced a new project, this time with Miguel Pais do Amaral in the GT Spanish Championship. In spite of the excellent results that were achieved in 2001, 2002 and 2003, it was in 2004 that everything began to run in a more consistent way, which allowed the duo to achieve the title of Vice-champions in the GT Iberic Cup and the third place in the GT Spanish Championship. In 2007, about to celebrate 25 years of his career, he decides along with Manuel Gião to compete in the GT Spanish Championship. The partnership could not have been better: several podiums, Iberian GT Champions and Vice-Champions of Spain. The following year, again with Gião, he decides to climb one more step and face the International GT Open, commonly named the European GT, and get the third place in the Championship in addition to the team title (PlayTeam Ferrari) along with M. Maceratesi and Andrea Montermini. In 2009 they remain in the same Championship but exchange the Ferrari for the team Porsche Official Italy (Autorlando). They finished the season in the fourth final position and repeat the title by teams, this time together with G.Roda and Richard Lietz. In the 2010s season, Pedro Couceiro remains at the International GT Open but this time in the GT3 category and with the Kessel team. After a few mishaps he obtains the fifth place in the championship even though he had been in the title fight until very close to the end of the season.

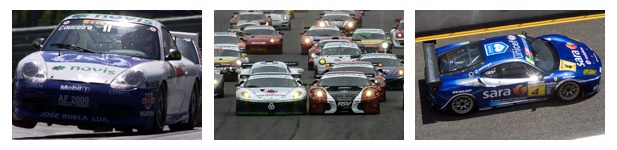

=== Actual ===
Pedro Couceiro officially left the competitions early in 2011. Since then, he has been dedicated exclusively to his business life, with the company PNC Lda, created in 1996 with his brother Nuno, responsible for the management and promotion of sports events, consulting and planning of sports careers. It is highlighted the "Management" and "Coaching" aspect of Competition Drivers, like: Filipe Albuquerque, Rafael Lobato, Manuel Gião, Yarin Stern, among others. In 2013, together with a wide range of various personalities from the most diverse areas of sports, cultural, artistic, economic and social society, they all created Meritis. This Youth Support Association has emerged from a common interest in collaborating and consistently helping young people who demonstrated talent in their activities, but also had the need and ability to better structure their careers. At the start of the 2016 season, he accepted the invitation to be "SafetyCar Official Driver" at the World Endurance Championship (WEC) becoming a part on the organization of one of the most prestigious world championships. In 2021, after being invited as an advisor, he also sits on the General Council of the Universidade de Coimbra. The mandate was extended until the end of 2024.

Currently he also works with the FIA - International Automobile Federation, as "Driver Advisor" and "Safetycar Driver".

== Racing record ==
=== Complete International Formula 3000 results ===
(key) (Races in bold indicate pole position) (Races in italics indicate fastest lap)

| Year | Entrant | 1 | 2 | 3 | 4 | 5 | 6 | 7 | 8 | 9 | 10 | DC | Points |
|---|---|---|---|---|---|---|---|---|---|---|---|---|---|
| 1996 | Madgwick International | NÜR; 5 | PAU; Ret | PER; 7 | HOC; Ret | SIL; Ret | SPA; 13 | | | | | 13th | 2 |
| 1996 | Edenbridge Racing | | | | | | | MAG | EST; 8 | MUG; 15 | HOC; Ret | 13th | 2 |
| 1997 | Draco Engineering | SIL; 2 | PAU; Ret | HEL; Ret | NÜR; 15 | PER; DNS | **HOC**; Ret | A1R; 11 | **SPA**; 7 | MUG; Ret | JER; Ret | 11th | 6 |
