= Stephen Watson (racing driver) =

South African racing driver (born 1973)

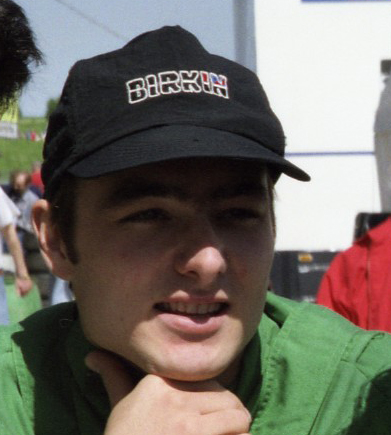
- Born: 18 February 1973 (age 53); Durban, South Africa

Stephen Watson (born 18 February 1973 in Durban, South Africa) is a South African racing driver who tested for the Arrows Formula One team in 1998 to 1999. He also competed in International Formula 3000 for three seasons from 1995 to 1997, scoring top-six finishes on two occasions.

Watson was founding general manager of A1GP, leaving after three years to join the 2010 FIFA World Cup Local Organizing Committee as Tournament Director. In 2009, Watson was Head Hunted by the Gauteng Provincial Government to Head up their international motorsport hosting aspirations. He joined the Gauteng Motorsport Company Which sort to host Formula 1 in the province. A later change in the provincial political leadership and subsequent changes to their strategic objectives, resulted in the project being shelved. Watson continued is employment term within the Gauteng Growth and Development Agency for a further four years. In 2013, Watson started his own business ventures and today is the managing director of Discover Digital in South Africa. In 2023, it was announced that Watson would be a co-founder of the All-Electric Supercar racing series Elite World Cup.

== Racing record ==
=== Complete International Formula 3000 results ===
(key) (Races in bold indicate pole position; races in italics indicate fastest lap.)

Year	Entrant	Chassis	Engine	1	2	3	4	5	6	7	8	9	10	Pos.	Pts
1995	Nordic Racing	Lola T95/50	Cosworth AC	SIL; Ret	CAT; 11	PAU; 12	PER; 7	HOC; Ret	SPA; 12	EST; Ret	MAG; 12			19th	0
1996	Team Alpha Plus	Lola T96/50	Zytek-Judd	NÜR; Ret	PAU; Ret	PER; Ret	HOC; Ret	SIL; 18	SPA; 16	MAG; 11	EST; Ret	MUG; 16	HOC; 10	23rd	0
1997	Durango Formula	Lola T96/50	Zytek-Judd	SIL; 15	PAU; DNQ	HEL; 6	NÜR; 16	PER; 7	HOC; 12	A1R; Ret	SPA; 6	MUG; 15	JER; Ret	20th	2
