= Emmanuel Clérico =

French racing driver

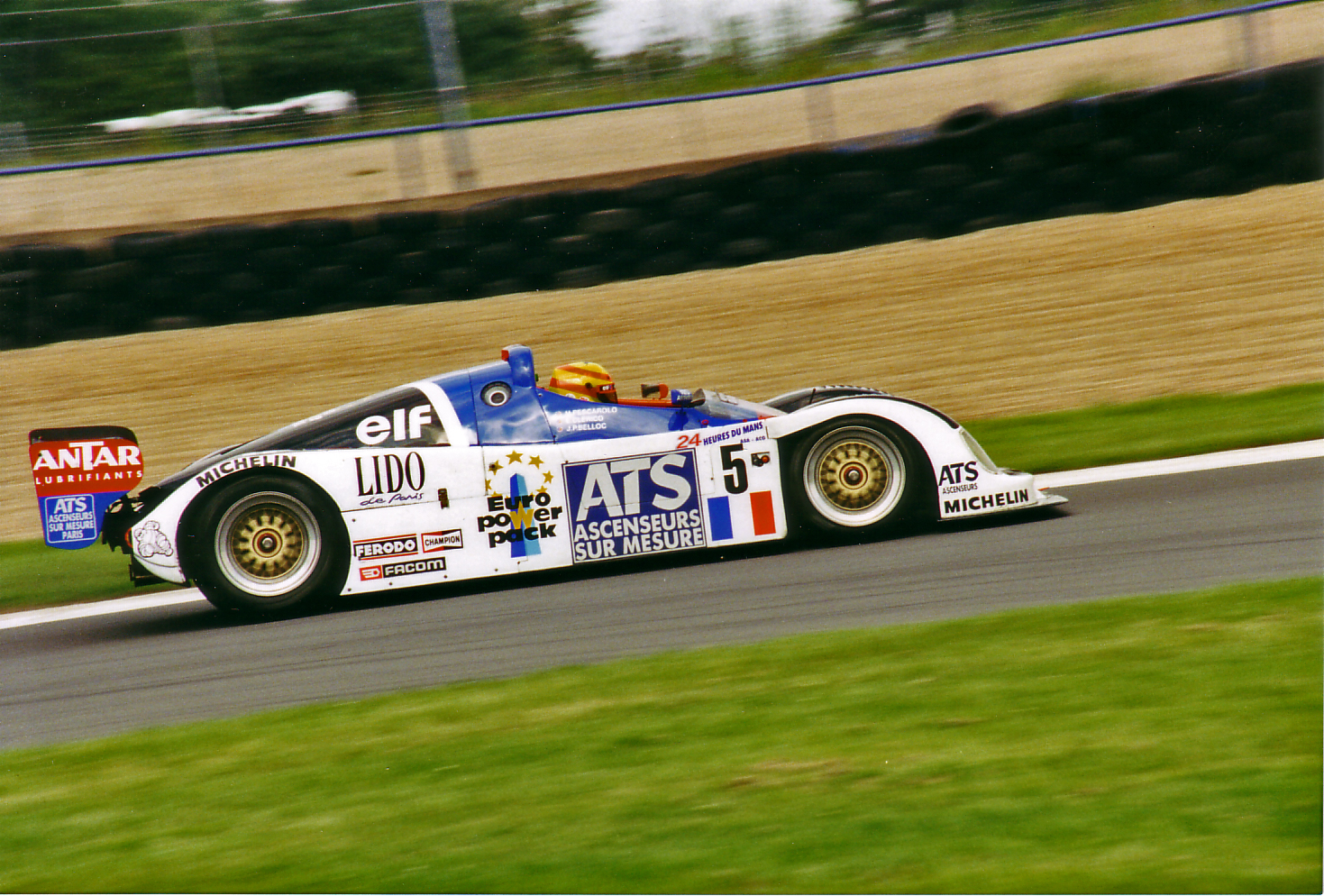
- Clérico in 1997
- Nationality: (France) French
- Born: 30 December 1969 (age 56) Neuilly-sur-Seine, France

Awards
- 1989: ACO Volant Gitanes
24 Hours of Le Mans career
- Years: 1995, 1997, 1999–2002
- Teams: La Filière Elf, Paul Belmondo Racing, Pescarolo Sport and DAMS
- Best finish: 4th (2000)
- Class wins: 0

Emmanuel Clérico (born 30 December 1969) is a French racing driver. A French F3 runner-up and International Formula 3000 front-runner in the 1990s, he was test driver for the Larrousse and Ligier Formula One teams. A graduate of ACO's driving school, he went on to race in the 24 Hours of Le Mans and FIA GT Championship.

In 1999, Clérico won the Homestead 3 Hours together with Paul Belmondo, and in 2000 was crowned Lamborghini GTR SuperTrophy champion.

Clérico was part of the Pescarolo Sport crew that finished fourth overall at the 2000 24 Hours of Le Mans behind the three factory Audis.

Clérico retired from motorsport in 2004, and now works as a farmer in Villepreux. He is a member of the Clérico family that owned the Moulin Rouge and Le Lido cabarets.

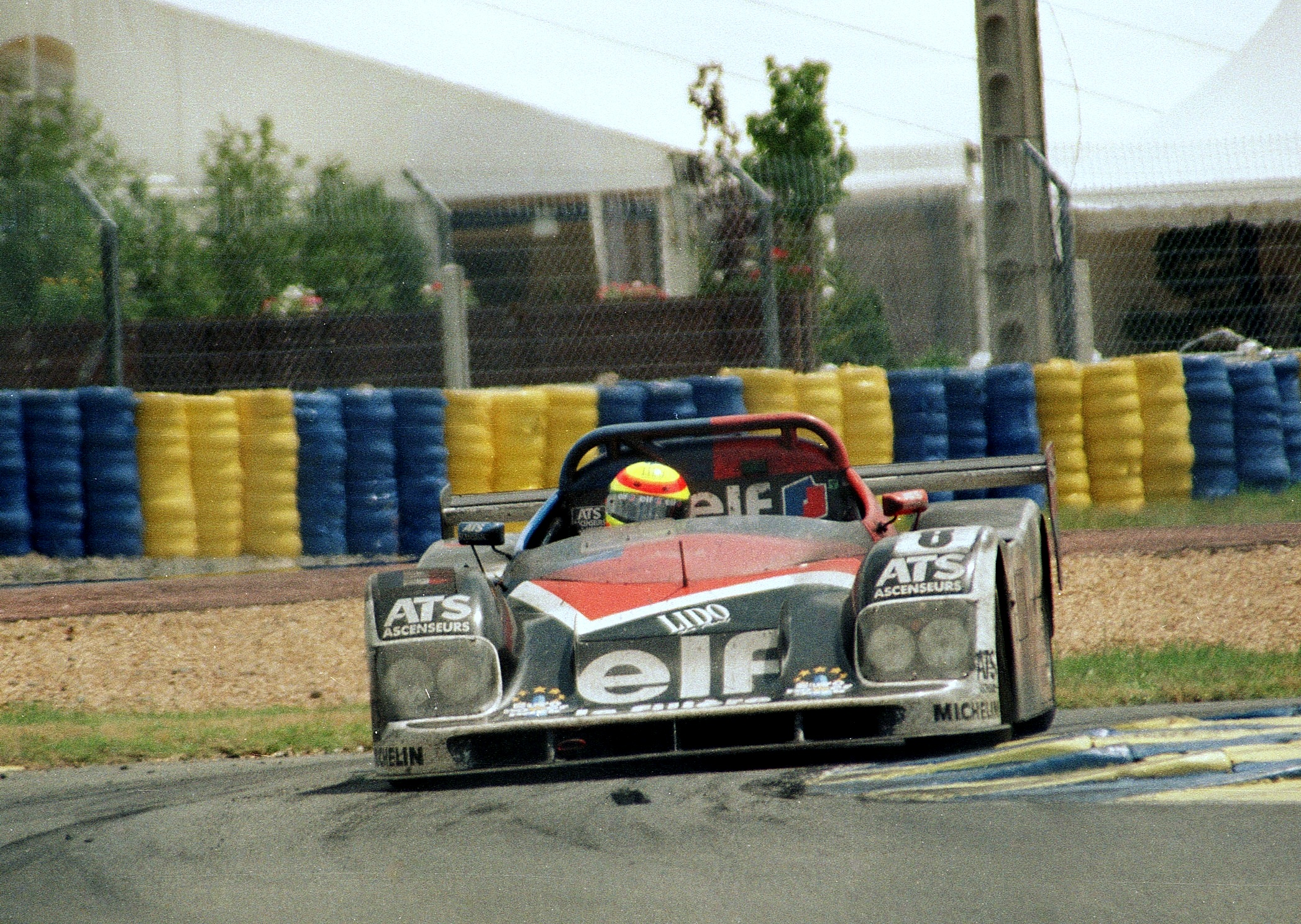
Clérico in his Elf-backed Courage at Le Mans in 1997.

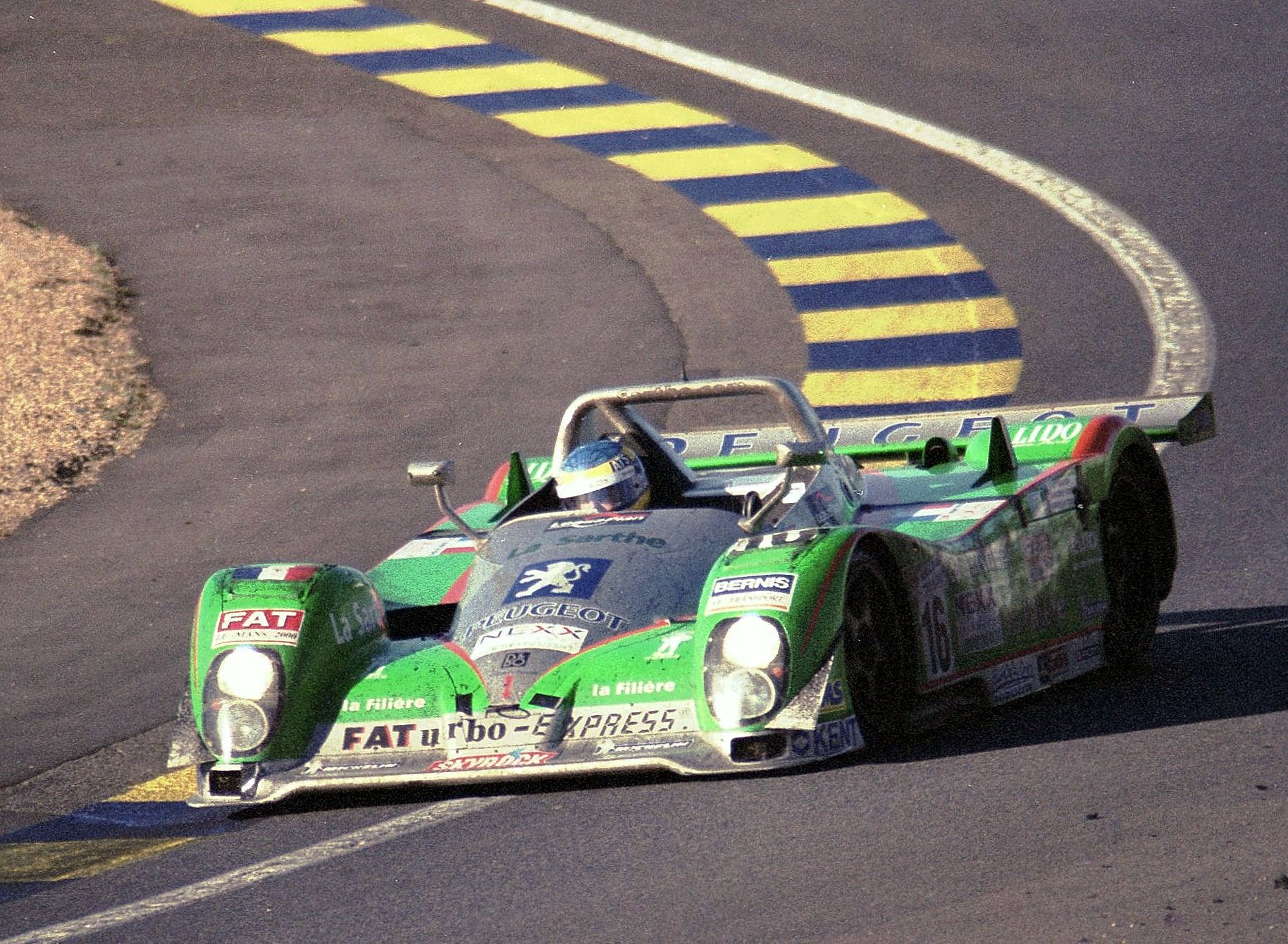
Clérico's Pescarolo in 2000.

== Racing record ==
=== Complete International Formula 3000 results ===
(key) (Races in bold indicate pole position) (Races in italics indicate fastest lap)

Year	Entrant	1	2	3	4	5	6	7	8	DC	Points
1994	Apomatox	SIL; Ret	PAU; Ret	CAT; Ret	PER; Ret	HOC; 15	SPA; Ret	**EST**; 7	MAG; Ret	19th	0
1995	Apomatox	SIL; Ret	CAT; 4	PAU; 7	PER; Ret	HOC; 4	SPA; 6	EST; 2	MAG; 5	6th	15

=== 24 Hours of Le Mans results ===
Year	Team	Co-Drivers	Car	Class	Laps	Pos.	Class Pos.
1995	(France) BBA Compétition	(France) Bernard Chauvin (France) Laurent Lécuyer	Venturi 600 LM	LMGT1	130	DNF	DNF
1997	(France) La Filière Elf	(France) Jean-Philippe Belloc (France) Henri Pescarolo	Courage C36-Porsche	LMP875	319	7th	4th
1999	(France) Paul Belmondo Racing	(France) Jean-Claude Lagniez (France) Guy Martinolle	Chrysler Viper GTS-R	LMGTS	309	16th	5th
2000	(France) Pescarolo Sport	(France) Sébastien Bourdais (France) Olivier Grouillard	Courage C52-Peugeot	LMP900	344	4th	4th
2001	(France) Pescarolo Sport	(France) Didier Cottaz (France) Boris Derichebourg	Courage C60-Peugeot	LMP900	42	DNF	DNF
2002	(France) DAMS	(France) Philippe Gache (Belgium) Michel Neugarten	Lola B98/10-Judd	LMP900	150	NC	NC
