= Jean-Philippe Belloc =

French racecar driver (born 1970)

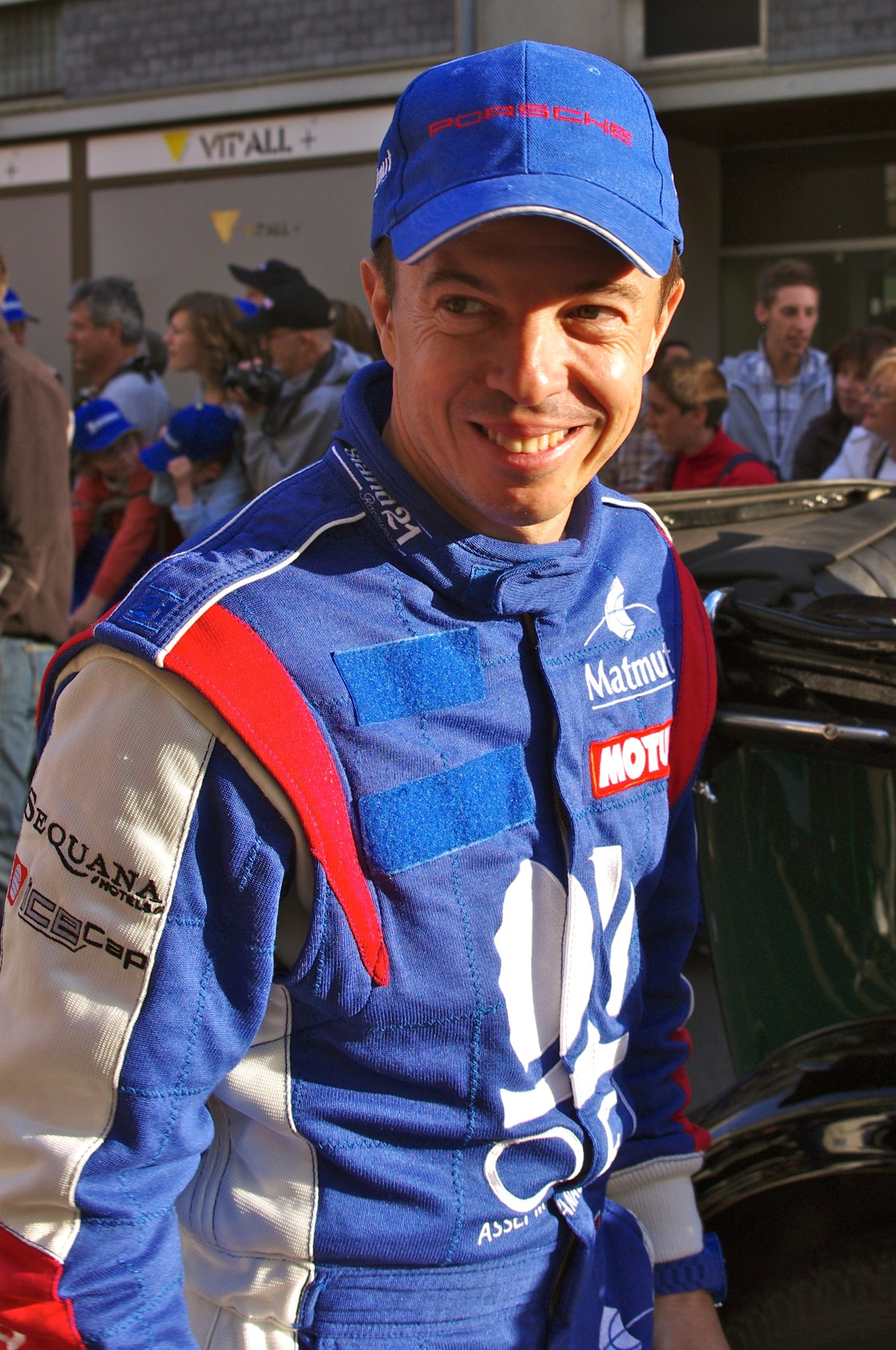
- Belloc at the 2011 24 Hours of Le Mans driver parade
- Nationality: (France) French
- Born: 24 April 1970 (age 56) Montauban, France
- Categorisation: FIA Gold (until 2016); FIA Silver (2017–)

24 Hours of Le Mans career
- Years: 1997–2002, 2007, 2011-2012, 2016
- Teams: La Filière Elf; Courage Compétition; Viper/Mopar Team Oreca; Larbre Compétition; Equipe de France FFSA
- Best finish: 7th (1997)
- Class wins: 0

Jean-Philippe Belloc (born 24 April 1970 in Montauban) is a racecar driver from France.

Belloc started racing in single-seaters and won the French Formula Renault Championship in 1992, at his second attempt, after four wins. Moving up to the French Formula Three Championship in 1993, he took the title the following year with five wins. He raced in Formula 3000 until 1997.

After a few seasons with occasional races in the French Porsche Carrera Cup, Belloc became a full-time sports car racing driver in 1998, when he was third in the Carrera Cup. The following year, he became a Chrysler works driver, in the Oreca Chrysler Viper GTS-R, and took second place in the FIA GT Championship, also racing in the American Le Mans Series. In 2001, he became FIA GT Champion, also winning the Spa 24 Hours.

From 2002, Belloc raced mainly in the ALMS, for Carsport America, but also took part in the French Supertouring Championship, FIA Sportscar Championship and FIA GT Championship. In 2006, he drove occasionally in the FIA GT, ALMS and Le Mans Series, where he took an LMP2 class win at the 1000 km of Istanbul. For 2007, he drove an Oreca Saleen S7-R in the 24 Hours of Le Mans.

== Racing record ==
=== 24 Hours of Le Mans results ===
| Year | Team | Co-Drivers | Car | Class | Laps | Pos. | Class Pos. |
|---|---|---|---|---|---|---|---|
| 1997 | (France) La Filière Elf | (France) Henri Pescarolo (France) Emmanuel Clérico | Courage C36-Porsche | LMP | 319 | 7th | 4th |
| 1998 | (France) Courage Compétition | (France) Didier Cottaz (Belgium) Marc Goossens | Courage C51-Nissan | LMP1 | 232 | DNF | DNF |
| 1999 | (France) Viper Team Oreca | (United States) David Donohue (France) Soheil Ayari | Chrysler Viper GTS-R | GTS | 271 | DNF | DNF |
| 2000 | (France) Mopar Team Oreca | (France) Yannick Dalmas (France) Nicolas Minassian | Reynard 2KQ-LM-Mopar | LMP900 | 1 | DNF | DNF |
| 2001 | (France) Larbre Compétition | (France) Christophe Bouchut (Portugal) Tiago Monteiro | Chrysler Viper GTS-R | GTS | 234 | 20th | 4th |
| 2002 | Equipe de France FFSA; Oreca | (France) Jonathan Cochet (France) Benoît Tréluyer | Chrysler Viper GTS-R | GTS | 326 | 14th | **3rd** |
| 2007 | (France) Team Oreca | (France) Laurent Groppi (France) Nicolas Prost | Saleen S7-R | GT1 | 337 | 10th | 5th |
| 2011 | (France) Larbre Compétition | (France) Christophe Bourret (France) Pascal Gibon | Porsche 997 GT3-RSR | GTE; Am | 301 | 21st | **2nd** |
| 2012 | (France) Larbre Compétition | (France) Christophe Bourret (France) Pascal Gibon | Chevrolet Corvette C6.R | GTE; Am | 309 | 28th | 5th |
| 2016 | (France) Larbre Compétition | (France) Pierre Ragues (Japan) Yutaka Yamagishi | Chevrolet Corvette C7.R | GTE; Am | 316 | 37th | 8th |

=== Complete Le Mans Series results ===
(key) (Races in bold indicate pole position; races in italics indicate fastest lap)

| Year | Entrant | Class | Car | Engine | 1 | 2 | 3 | 4 | 5 | Pos. | Points |
|---|---|---|---|---|---|---|---|---|---|---|---|
| 2006 | Barazi-Epsilon | LMP2 | Courage C65 | AER P07 2.0 L Turbo I4 | IST; 1 | SPA | NÜR; 6 | DON | JAR | 14th | 13 |
| 2008 | IMSA Performance Matmut | GT2 | Porsche 997 GT3-RSR | Porsche M97/77 3.8 L Flat-6 | CAT; 7 | MON; Ret | SPA | NÜR; 6 | SIL | 27th | 5 |

=== Complete European Le Mans Series results ===
| Year | Entrant | Class | Chassis | Engine | 1 | 2 | 3 | 4 | 5 | Rank | Points |
|---|---|---|---|---|---|---|---|---|---|---|---|
| 2014 | Team Sofrev ASP | GTC | Ferrari 458 Italia GT3 | Ferrari F136 4.5 L V8 | SIL; 11 | IMO; 5 | RBR; 10 | LEC; 13 | EST; 10 | 18th | 13 |

=== Complete American Open Wheel racing results ===
(key)

==== Indy Lights ====
| Year | Team | 1 | 2 | 3 | 4 | 5 | 6 | 7 | 8 | 9 | 10 | 11 | 12 | 13 | Rank | Points |
|---|---|---|---|---|---|---|---|---|---|---|---|---|---|---|---|---|
| 1997 | Autosport Racing | MIA | LBH | NAZ | SAV | STL | MIL | DET | POR | TOR | TRO | VAN | LAG; 24 | FON | **34th** | **0** |

Sporting positions
| Preceded by Olivier Couvreur | Championnat de France Formule Renault Champion; 1989 | Succeeded by David Dussau |
| Preceded by Didier Cottaz | French Formula Three; Champion; 1994 | Succeeded by Laurent Redon |
| Preceded by Julian Bailey; Jamie Campbell-Walter | FIA GT Champion; 2001 with: (Christophe Bouchut) | Succeeded by Thomas Biagi; Matteo Bobbi |
