= Edoardo Bisconcin =

Italian auto and motocross racer

- Nationality: Italian
- Born: 8 October 1972 (age 53)

Motocross career
- Years active: 1990–2004
- Championships: Motocross (1990–1994); Rally (1995); Ferrari Challenge Europe (2000); Euro Formula 3000 (2004)

Edoardo Bisconcin (born 8 October 1972) is a professional Motocross, Rally, Ferrari Challenge Europe, and Euro Formula 3000 race driver.

== Career ==
- 1990–1994: Motocross
- 1995: Rally
- 2003: Ferrari Challenge Europe
- 2004: Euro Formula 3000
