= Thomas Biagi =

Italian racing driver

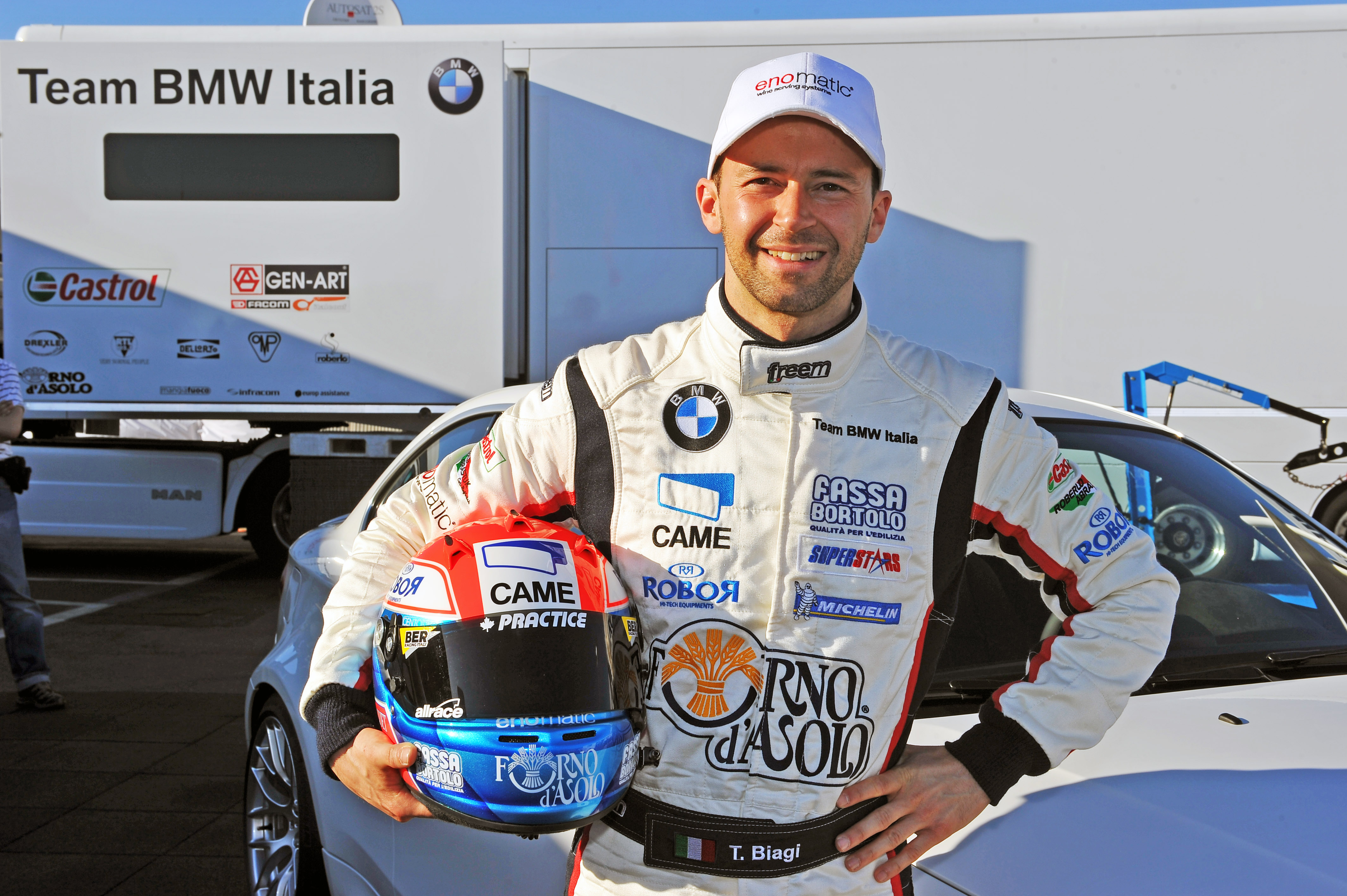
- Thomas Biagi in 2011, as a Superstars Series driver.
- Nationality: (Italy) Italian
- Born: 7 May 1976 (age 50) Bologna, Italy
- Categorisation: FIA Platinum (until 2013); FIA Gold (2014–)

Championship titles
- 2012 2003, 2007 1999, 2001: Italian GT Championship; FIA GT Championship; Bologna Motorshow F3000 Sprint

24 Hours of Le Mans career
- Years: 2004, 2008–
- Teams: Barron Connor Racing, AF Corse, Racing Box
- Best finish: DNF
- Class wins: 0

Thomas Biagi (born 7 May 1976, in Bologna), is an Italian professional racing driver.

Biagi started his career in single seaters, driving in Formula Alfa Boxer and Italian Formula Three Championship, where he was fifth best in 1995, with two wins. From there, he moved up to the FIA Formula 3000 Championship from 1995 to 1998, without major results. His debut race in 1995 saw him collide with Marco Campos on the last lap, resulting in a crash that caused fatal injuries to Campos.

Biagi switched to the "second division", the Italian F3000 Championship, in 1999, taking fourth place, which he repeated in 2000 (after the series had become Euro F3000), this time with a win, before taking a second overall in 2001, in his second season with GP Racing.

In 2003, Biagi made a successful move to the FIA GT Championship, which he won in a BMS Scuderia Italia Ferrari 550 Maranello (co-driven with Matteo Bobbi). After a year in the Le Mans Endurance Series, he returned to the FIA GT with Vitaphone Racing, helping the squad take two Team titles before winning the Drivers title himself in 2007.

In spite of having won the drivers title in the GT1 class, Biagi downgraded to GT2 in 2008, to drive a Ferrari 430 for AF Corse.

== Racing record ==
=== Complete International Formula 3000 results ===
(key) (Races in bold indicate pole position; races in italics indicate fastest lap.)

| Year | Entrant | Chassis | Engine | 1 | 2 | 3 | 4 | 5 | 6 | 7 | 8 | 9 | 10 | 11 | 12 | Pos | Points |
|---|---|---|---|---|---|---|---|---|---|---|---|---|---|---|---|---|---|
| 1995 | Auto Sport Racing | Reynard 95D | Cosworth | SIL | CAT | PAU | PER | HOC | SPA | EST | MAG; 9 | | | | | NC | 0 |
| 1996 | Auto Sport Racing | Lola T96/50 | Zytek-Judd | NÜR; Ret | PAU; DNQ | PER; 8 | HOC; DSQ | SIL | SPA; DNQ | MAG; 6 | EST; 6 | MUG; 5 | HOC; 7 | | | 12th | 4 |
| 1997 | Nordic Racing | Lola T96/50 | Zytek-Judd | SIL; DNQ | PAU; DNQ | HEL; DNQ | | | | | | | | | | 31st | 0 |
| 1997 | GP Racing | Lola T96/50 | Zytek-Judd | | | | NÜR; DNQ | PER; 14 | HOC; 18 | A1R; Ret | SPA; Ret | MUG; 16 | JER; 12 | | | 31st | 0 |
| 1998 | Coloni Motorsport | Lola T96/50 | Zytek-Judd | OSC; 4 | IMO; 10 | CAT | SIL | MON | PAU | | | | | | | 15th | 3 |
| 1998 | Prema Powerteam | Lola T96/50 | Zytek-Judd | | | | | | | A1R; 12 | HOC; 10 | HUN; 13 | SPA; 10 | PER; Ret | NÜR; 12 | 15th | 3 |
| 1999 | Monaco Motorsport | Lola T99/50 | Zytek | IMO; DNQ | MON; DNQ | CAT; DNQ | MAG; DNQ | SIL; DNQ | A1R | HOC | HUN | SPA | NÜR | | | NC | 0 |

=== 24 Hours of Le Mans results ===
| Year | Team | Co-Drivers | Car | Class | Laps | Pos. | Class Pos. |
|---|---|---|---|---|---|---|---|
| 2004 | (Netherlands) Barron Connor Racing | (Netherlands) John Bosch (United States) Danny Sullivan | Ferrari 575-GTC | GTS | 163 | DNF | DNF |
| 2008 | (Italy) AF Corse | (Finland) Toni Vilander (San Marino) Christian Montanari | Ferrari F430 GT2 | GT2 | 111 | DNF | DNF |
| 2009 | (Italy) Racing Box | (Italy) Andrea Piccini (Italy) Matteo Bobbi | Lola B08/80-Judd | LMP2 | 203 | DNF | DNF |

=== 24 Hours of Daytona ===
(key)

24 Hours of Daytona results
| Year | Class | No | Team | Car | Co-drivers | Laps | Position | Class Pos. |
|---|---|---|---|---|---|---|---|---|
| 2008 | GT | 56 | (Italy) Mastercar | Ferrari F430 Challenge | (Hong Kong) Matthew Marsh (San Marino) Christian Montanari | 55 | 64 ^{DNF} | 40 ^{DNF} |

=== Complete International Superstars Series results ===
(key) (Races in bold indicate pole position) (Races in italics indicate fastest lap)

| Year | Team | Car | 1 | 2 | 3 | 4 | 5 | 6 | 7 | 8 | 9 | 10 | 11 | 12 | 13 | 14 | 15 | 16 | DC | Points |
|---|---|---|---|---|---|---|---|---|---|---|---|---|---|---|---|---|---|---|---|---|
| 2010 | Team BMW Italia | BMW M3 (E92) | MNZ; R1; 4 | MNZ; R2; 4 | IMO; R1; 1 | IMO; R2; 2 | **ALG**; **R1**; 2 | ALG; R2; 5 | HOC; R1; 2 | HOC; R2; 4 | CPR; R1; 6 | CPR; R2; 2 | VAL; R1; 3 | VAL; R2; 5 | KYA; R1; 8 | **KYA**; **R2**; 1 | | | **1st** | **170** |
| 2011 | Team BMW Italia | BMW M3 (E92) | MNZ; R1; 4 | MNZ; R2; 8 | VNC; R1; 3 | VNC; R2; 4 | ALG; R1; 1 | ALG; R2; 1 | DON; R1; 7 | DON; R2; 9 | MIS; R1; 3 | MIS; R2; 18 | SPA; R1; 6 | SPA; R2; 4 | MUG; R1; 4 | MUG; R2; 2 | VAL; R1; 4 | VAL; R2; 10 | 4th | 147 |
| 2012 | Dinamic | BMW M3 (E92) | MNZ; R1; 4 | MNZ; R2; 4 | IMO; R1; 3 | IMO; R2; 2 | DON; R1; 4 | DON; R2; 6 | **MUG**; **R1**; Ret | MUG; R2; 3 | HUN; R1; 2 | HUN; R2; 3 | SPA; R1; 10 | SPA; R2; 4 | VAL; R1; 3 | VAL; R2; 6 | PER; R1; Ret | PER; R2; 3 | **3rd** | **161** |
| 2013 | Mercedes-AMG Romeo Ferraris | Mercedes C63 AMG | MNZ; R1; 2 | MNZ; R2; 1 | **BRN**; **R1**; 1 | BRN; R2; 3 | SVK; R1; 2 | SVK; R2; 2 | ZOL; R1; 9 | ZOL; R2; 4 | ALG; R1; 3 | ALG; R2; 4 | DON; R1; DSQ | DON; R2; DSQ | IMO; R1; 13 | IMO; R2; 7 | VAL; R1; 10 | VAL; R2; 6 | 4th | 138 |

=== Complete Porsche Supercup results ===
(key) (Races in bold indicate pole position) (Races in italics indicate fastest lap)

| Year | Team | 1 | 2 | 3 | 4 | 5 | 6 | 7 | 8 | 9 | 10 | DC | Points |
|---|---|---|---|---|---|---|---|---|---|---|---|---|---|
| 2014 | MOMO-Megatron | ESP; 22† | MON; 23 | AUT; 21 | GBR; 16 | GER; 16 | HUN; 16 | BEL; 18 | ITA; 20 | USA; 19 | USA; 25† | 28th | 0 |

^{†} Did not finish, but was classified as he had completed more than 90% of the race distance.

== Sources ==
Sporting positions
| Preceded by Christophe Bouchut | FIA GT Champion; 2003 with: Matteo Bobbi | Succeeded by Fabrizio Gollin; Luca Cappellari |
| Preceded by Andrea Bertolini; Michael Bartels | FIA GT Champion; 2007 | Succeeded by Andrea Bertolini; Michael Bartels |
| Preceded by Gianni Morbidelli | Italian Superstars Series champion 2010 | Succeeded by Alberto Cerqui |
| Preceded by Gianni Morbidelli | International Superstars Series champion 2010 | Succeeded by Andrea Bertolini |
| Preceded by Miguel Ramos; Alvaro Parente | International GT Open champion 2016 with Fabrizio Crestani | Succeeded by Giovanni Venturini |
