= Peter Olsson (motorsports driver) =

Swedish racing driver (born 1971)

Roy Peter Lovenkjaer Olsson (born 17 July 1971 in Höja, Sweden) is a former professional racing driver, now a chiropractor, resident in England. Olsson competed in the British Formula Two Championship in 1992, finishing sixth overall in the Drivers' Championship. He also raced several times in the British Formula 3000 Championship in 1991 and the International Formula 3000 Championship in 1994 and 1996.

== Early life ==
At the age of six, Olsson moved to the UK with his parents. He grew up in Sevenoaks, Kent, and his first love was karting, which he took up in 1985. Preferring to race rather than study, Olsson left school without completing his A levels.

== Racing career ==
Olsson received both his novice karting licence and International Short Circuit licence in 1985 and went on to win the South of England Championship in two consecutive years shortly after. In 1988 he was awarded a ‘super national’ license, which was the highest possible ranked license in karting. This was the same year that David Coulthard received his license, and that year he also placed sixth in the Super 1 National Kart Championships – the premier karting championship in the UK. Before moving into racing full-time, Olsson was briefly a high performance driving instructor at Brands Hatch race circuit in 1988. The following year, at the age of 18, he moved to racing cars, competing in the European Vauxhall Lotus Championship. In 1990 he finished third at the British race at Silverstone in the same championship.

Between 1991 and 1996, Olsson competed in races in both the British and International F3000 Championships. He represented the Edenbridge racing team, as well as Gosselin Competition and Omegaland, and drove Reynard cars. He celebrated his finest achievement in racing when driving for the Phoenix F3000 Racing team in the 1992 British Formula Two Championship, finishing sixth in the overall Drivers’ Championship and second in the final race of the season at the Donington GP circuit. He also gained a podium finish as third place finisher in the Round 6 race at Oulton Park.

== Retirement ==
Olsson retired from racing at the age of 26, when he was crippled in an accident.
