= Guillaume Gomez =

French racing driver

Guillaume Gomez (born 25 July 1969 in Orléans) is a French former racing driver.
