= List of Superleague Formula records =

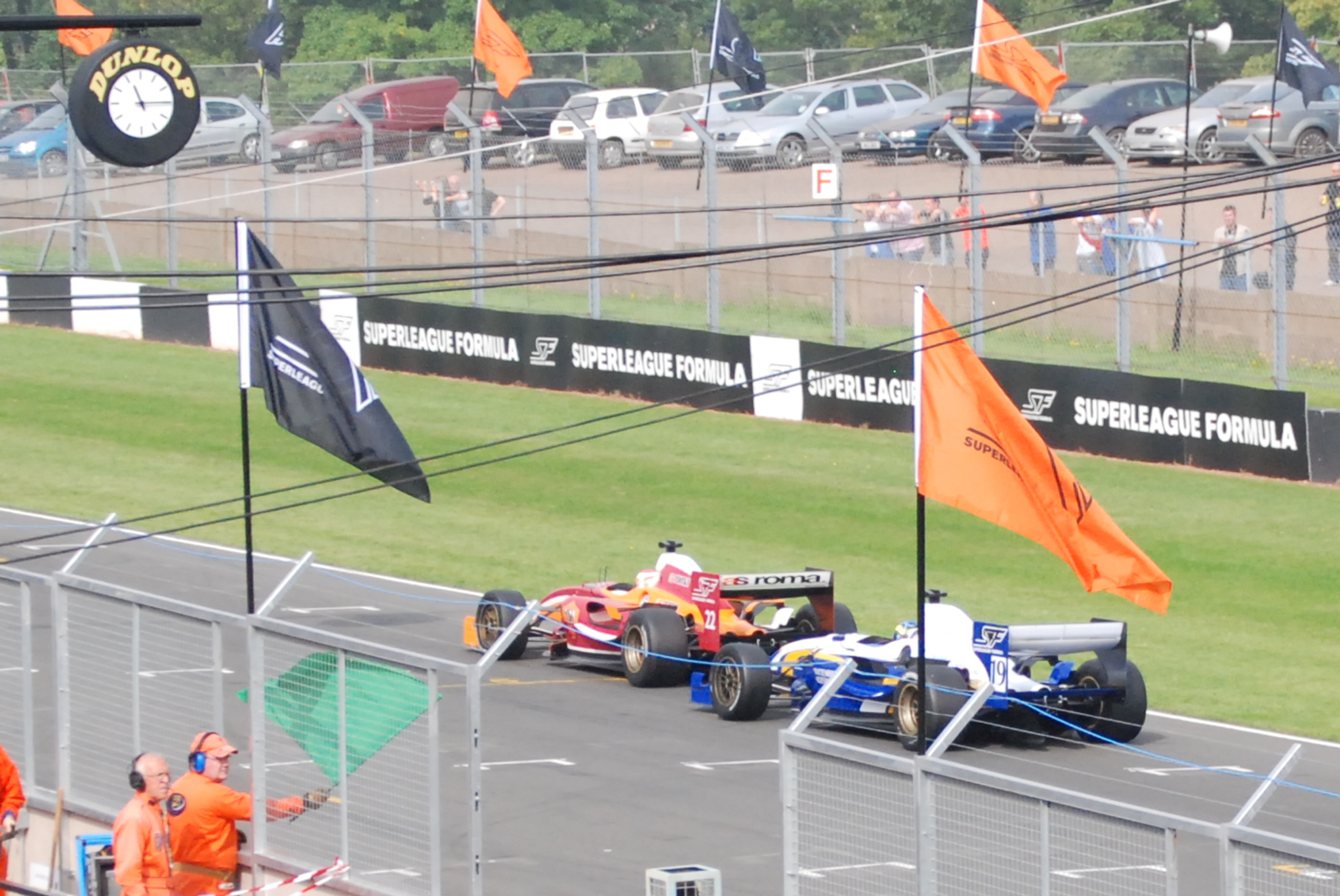
Duncan Tappy behind Enrico Toccacelo mid-race at Donington Park in 2008

This is a list of Superleague Formula records since the inaugural 2008 Superleague Formula season. The list includes records for the football clubs, drivers and race teams who have competed in Superleague Formula. This list is accurate up to and including the final round of the 2010 championship at Navarra.

== Championships ==
Football clubs
	Club	Title	2nd	3rd	4th
1	(England) Liverpool F.C.	1			1
1	(Belgium) R.S.C. Anderlecht	1			1
3	(China) Beijing Guoan	1			
4	(England) Tottenham Hotspur		2		
5	(Netherlands) PSV Eindhoven		1		
6	(Switzerland) FC Basel 1893			2	
7	(Italy) A.C. Milan			1	
8	(Greece) Olympiacos CFP				1

Drivers
	Driver	Title	2nd	3rd	4th
1	(Italy) Davide Rigon	2			
2	(Spain) Adrián Vallés	1			1
3	(United Kingdom) Craig Dolby		2		
4	(Netherlands) Yelmer Buurman		1		1
5	(Germany) Max Wissel			2	
6	(Netherlands) Robert Doornbos			1	
7	van der Drift/Hanley/Jani				1

Race teams
	Team	Title	2nd	3rd	4th
1	(Belgium) Azerti Motorsport	1	1		1
2	(Germany) GU-Racing International	1		1	
3	(Germany) Zakspeed	1			1
4	(United Kingdom) Hitech Junior Team	1			
5	(United Kingdom) Alan Docking Racing		2		
6	(Italy) Scuderia Playteam		1		
7	(United Kingdom) Atech GP/Reid Motorsport			1	
8	(Spain) GTA Motor Competición				1

== Pole positions ==
- Only pole positions earned from Saturday qualifying are counted, i.e. only Race 1 pole positions. Race 2 pole positions, awarded by virtue of the reverse grid, are not included, nor are Super Final poles.

Football clubs
	Club	Poles
1	(China) Beijing Guoan	3
1	(Greece) Olympiacos CFP	3
1	(Belgium) R.S.C. Anderlecht	3
1	(Brazil) SC Corinthians	3
5	(Italy) A.S. Roma	2
5	(England) Liverpool F.C.	2
5	(Spain) Sevilla FC	2
8	(Italy) A.C. Milan	1
8	(Germany) Borussia Dortmund	1
8	(Switzerland) FC Basel 1893	1
8	(Denmark) FC Midtjylland	1
8	(Portugal) F.C. Porto	1
8	(England) Tottenham Hotspur	1

Drivers
	Driver	Poles
1	(Italy) Davide Rigon	4
2	(Brazil) Antônio Pizzonia	3
3	(Australia) John Martin	2
3	(Spain) Adrián Vallés	2
5	(Denmark) Kasper Andersen	1
5	(France) Sébastien Bourdais	1
5	(United Kingdom) Craig Dolby	1
5	(Netherlands) Robert Doornbos	1
5	(New Zealand) Chris van der Drift	1
5	(Argentina) Esteban Guerrieri	1
5	(United Kingdom) Ben Hanley	1
5	(France) Julien Jousse	1
5	(Spain) Marcos Martínez	1
5	(Netherlands) Paul Meijer	1
5	(Portugal) Álvaro Parente	1
5	(France) Franck Perera	1
5	(Germany) Max Wissel	1

Race teams
	Team	Poles
1	(United Kingdom) Alan Docking Racing	6
2	(Germany) GU-Racing International	4
3	(Belgium) Azerti Motorsport	3
3	(United Kingdom) Hitech Junior Team	3
5	(Spain) EmiliodeVillota Motorsport	2
5	(Germany) Zakspeed	2
7	(United Kingdom) Atech GP/Reid Motorsport	1
7	(Italy) FMS International	1
7	(United Kingdom) Reid Motorsport	1
7	(Italy) Scuderia Playteam	1

== Race 1 and 2 starts ==
- Only four of the football clubs who have competed in Superleague Formula have started 100% of all races, and Craig Dolby is the only driver to have started 100% of all races.

Football clubs
	Club	Starts
1	(Italy) A.S. Roma	48
1	(England) Liverpool F.C.	48
1	(Greece) Olympiacos CFP	48
1	(England) Tottenham Hotspur	48
5	(Italy) A.C. Milan	47
5	(Portugal) F.C. Porto	47
5	(Turkey) Galatasaray S.K.	47
5	(Belgium) R.S.C. Anderlecht	47
9	(Brazil) CR Flamengo	46
9	(Netherlands) PSV Eindhoven	46
9	(Brazil) SC Corinthians	46

Drivers
	Driver	Starts
1	(United Kingdom) Craig Dolby	48
2	(Netherlands) Yelmer Buurman	47
3	(France) Tristan Gommendy	45
3	(Germany) Max Wissel	45
5	(Italy) Davide Rigon	42
6	(Australia) John Martin	35
7	(Netherlands) Robert Doornbos	33
8	(Spain) Adrián Vallés	30
9	(France) Julien Jousse	26
10	(Spain) Marcos Martínez	24
10	(Portugal) Álvaro Parente	24
10	(France) Franck Perera	24
10	(United Kingdom) Duncan Tappy	24

Race teams
	Team	Starts
1	(United Kingdom) Alan Docking Racing	118
2	(Belgium) Azerti Motorsport	112
3	(United Kingdom) Atech GP/Reid Motorsport	111
4	(Germany) GU-Racing International	98
5	(Spain) EmiliodeVillota Motorsport	54
6	(United Kingdom) Hitech Junior Team	46
6	(Germany) Zakspeed	46
8	(France) Barazi-Epsilon	41
9	(United Kingdom) Alpha Team	24
9	(Spain) GTA Motor Competición	24
9	(Belgium) Team Astromega	24

== Race 1 and 2 wins ==
Football clubs
	Club	Wins
1	(China) Beijing Guoan	7
2	(Portugal) F.C. Porto	6
3	(Italy) A.C. Milan	5
3	(Greece) Olympiacos CFP	5
5	(England) Liverpool F.C.	4
6	(Belgium) R.S.C. Anderlecht	3
6	(Spain) Sevilla FC	3
6	(England) Tottenham Hotspur	3
9	(United Arab Emirates) Al Ain	2
9	(Switzerland) FC Basel 1893	2
9	(Netherlands) PSV Eindhoven	2

Drivers
	Driver	Wins
1	(Italy) Davide Rigon	5
2	(Netherlands) Yelmer Buurman	4
2	(Australia) John Martin	4
2	(Portugal) Álvaro Parente	4
5	(United Kingdom) Craig Dolby	3
5	(Spain) Adrián Vallés	3
7	(France) Sébastien Bourdais	2
7	(Netherlands) Robert Doornbos	2
7	(New Zealand) Chris van der Drift	2
7	(France) Tristan Gommendy	2
7	(Argentina) Esteban Guerrieri	2
7	(Germany) Max Wissel	2

Race teams
	Team	Wins
1	(United Kingdom) Alan Docking Racing	7
1	(United Kingdom) Atech GP/Reid Motorsport	7
1	(Germany) GU-Racing International	7
4	(United Kingdom) Hitech Junior Team	6
4	(Germany) Zakspeed	6
6	(Belgium) Azerti Motorsport	5
7	(Spain) EmiliodeVillota Motorsport	2
7	(United Kingdom) Reid Motorsport	2
7	(Italy) Scuderia Playteam	2
10	(France) Barazi-Epsilon	1
10	(Spain) GTA Motor Competición	1
10	(France) LRS Formula	1
10	(United Kingdom) Ultimate Motorsport	1

== Race 1 and 2 podiums ==
Football clubs
	Club	Podiums
1	(England) Tottenham Hotspur	15
2	(Belgium) R.S.C. Anderlecht	13
3	(Italy) A.C. Milan	12
3	(Greece) Olympiacos CFP	12
5	(China) Beijing Guoan	10
6	(Portugal) F.C. Porto	9
6	(England) Liverpool F.C.	9
8	(Brazil) CR Flamengo	8
9	(Italy) A.S. Roma	7
9	(Switzerland) FC Basel 1893	7
9	(Spain) Sevilla FC	7

Drivers
	Driver	Podiums
1	(United Kingdom) Craig Dolby	15
2	(Italy) Davide Rigon	14
3	(Netherlands) Yelmer Buurman	10
4	(Australia) John Martin	8
5	(Netherlands) Robert Doornbos	7
5	(United Kingdom) Duncan Tappy	7
5	(Spain) Adrián Vallés	7
5	(Germany) Max Wissel	7
9	(New Zealand) Chris van der Drift	6
9	(France) Tristan Gommendy	6

Race teams
	Team	Podiums
1	(United Kingdom) Alan Docking Racing	23
2	(Germany) GU-Racing International	19
3	(Belgium) Azerti Motorsport	18
4	(United Kingdom) Atech GP/Reid Motorsport	17
5	(United Kingdom) Hitech Junior Team	12
6	(Germany) Zakspeed	11
7	(Italy) Scuderia Playteam	8
8	(France) Barazi-Epsilon	5
8	(Spain) EmiliodeVillota Motorsport	5
10	(United Kingdom) Alpha Team	4
10	(Spain) GTA Motor Competición	4
10	(United Kingdom) Reid Motorsport	4
10	(Belgium) Team Astromega	4

== Fastest laps ==
- These are fastest laps attained in races 1 and 2, not including Super Finals.

Football clubs
	Club	Fastest laps
1	(Switzerland) FC Basel 1893	6
2	(Brazil) SC Corinthians	5
3	(Italy) A.C. Milan	4
3	(England) Liverpool F.C.	4
3	(Belgium) R.S.C. Anderlecht	4
3	(England) Tottenham Hotspur	4
7	(Spain) Atlético Madrid	3
7	(China) Beijing Guoan	3
7	(Portugal) F.C. Porto	3
7	(Greece) Olympiacos CFP	3

Drivers
	Driver	Fastest laps
1	(Netherlands) Yelmer Buurman	8
2	(Germany) Max Wissel	6
3	(United Kingdom) Craig Dolby	5
4	(Brazil) Antônio Pizzonia	4
4	(Italy) Davide Rigon	4
4	(Spain) Andy Soucek	4
7	(Belgium) Frédéric Vervisch	3
8	(France) Tristan Gommendy	2
8	(United Kingdom) Ben Hanley	2
8	(Portugal) Álvaro Parente	2

Race teams
	Team	Fastest laps
1	(United Kingdom) Atech GP/Reid Motorsport	10
1	(Germany) GU-Racing International	10
3	(United Kingdom) Alan Docking Racing	7
4	(Germany) Zakspeed	6
5	(Belgium) Azerti Motorsport	4
5	(Italy) EuroInternational	4
7	(United Kingdom) Hitech Junior Team	2
8	(United Kingdom) Alpha Motorsport	1
8	(France) Barazi-Epsilon	1
8	(Spain) EmiliodeVillota Motorsport	1
8	(France) LRS Formula	1
8	(Belgium) Team Astromega	1

== Points in one weekend ==
- A maximum of 100 points can be scored from Races 1 and 2 by one club/driver in a single weekend.

Football clubs and drivers
	Club	Driver	Race 1 and 2 Points	Round
1	(Italy) A.C. Milan	(Netherlands) Robert Doornbos	90	2008 Estoril
1	(Switzerland) FC Basel 1893	(Germany) Max Wissel	90	2009 Donington Park
1	(Switzerland) FC Basel 1893	(Germany) Max Wissel	90 ^{1}	2010 Ordos
1	(Belgium) R.S.C. Anderlecht	(United Kingdom) Craig Dolby	90	2008 Nürburgring
1	(Spain) Sevilla FC	(France) Sébastien Bourdais	90	2009 Monza
6	(Greece) Olympiacos CFP	(United Kingdom) Ben Hanley	86 ^{2}	2010 Ordos
6	(England) Tottenham Hotspur	(United Kingdom) Craig Dolby	86 ^{3}	2010 Silverstone
8	(China) Beijing Guoan	(Italy) Davide Rigon	82	2008 Vallelunga
9	(Greece) Olympiacos CFP	(Argentina) Esteban Guerrieri	81	2009 Monza
9	(England) Tottenham Hotspur	(United Kingdom) Craig Dolby	81	2009 Jarama
9	(England) Tottenham Hotspur	(United Kingdom) Craig Dolby	81 ^{4}	2010 Magny-Cours
12	(England) Liverpool F.C.	(Spain) Adrián Vallés	80	2009 Zolder
13	(Italy) A.C. Milan	(Netherlands) Robert Doornbos	79	2008 Nürburgring
13	(United Arab Emirates) Al Ain	(Argentina) Esteban Guerrieri	79	2009 Zolder
13	(China) Beijing Guoan	(Italy) Davide Rigon	79	2008 Donington Park
13	(China) Beijing Guoan	(Australia) John Martin	79 ^{5}	2010 Navarra
13	(England) Liverpool F.C.	(Spain) Adrián Vallés	79	2008 Zolder
13	(England) Liverpool F.C.	(Spain) Adrián Vallés	79	2009 Magny-Cours

1. 91 points were scored in total by FC Basel/Wissel that weekend, including 1 point from the Super Final.

2. 88 points were scored in total by Olympiacos/Hanley that weekend, including 2 points from the Super Final.

3. 92 points were scored in total by Tottenham/Dolby that weekend, including 6 points from the Super Final.

4. 82 points were scored in total by Tottenham/Dolby that weekend, including 1 point from the Super Final.

5. 85 points were scored in total by Beijing/Martin that weekend, including 6 points from the Super Final.

NOTE - 82 points were scored in total by A.C. Milan/Buurman on the 2010 Magny-Cours weekend; 76 from races 1 and 2, and 6 points from the Super Final.

NOTE - 81 points were scored in total by Tottenham/Dolby on the 2010 Navarra weekend; 76 from races 1 and 2, and 5 points from the Super Final.

NOTE - 79 points were scored in total by Anderlecht/Rigon on the 2010 Adria weekend; 73 from races 1 and 2, and 6 points from the Super Final.

== Total points ==
- In 2008 and 2009, a club/driver did not have to finish a race to score points, but did have to start.
- In 2010, a club/driver had to both start and finish a race in order to score points.
- Super Finals were first raced in 2009 but points were only awarded beginning in 2010.

Football clubs (Races 1 and 2)
	Club	Points
1	(England) Tottenham Hotspur	1316
2	(Belgium) R.S.C. Anderlecht	1262
3	(Italy) A.C. Milan	1226
4	(England) Liverpool F.C.	1164
5	(Switzerland) FC Basel 1893	1153
6	(Greece) Olympiacos CFP	1087
7	(Portugal) F.C. Porto	1064
8	(Italy) A.S. Roma	967
9	(Brazil) CR Flamengo	914
10	(Brazil) SC Corinthians	889
11	(Turkey) Galatasaray S.K.	869
12	(Spain) Sevilla FC	868
13	(China) Beijing Guoan	842
14	(Netherlands) PSV Eindhoven	766
15	(Spain) Atlético Madrid	598
16	(Portugal) Sporting CP	544
17	(Scotland) Rangers F.C.	468
18	(France) Olympique Lyonnais	391
19	(United Arab Emirates) Al Ain	379
20	(France) GD Bordeaux	365
21	(Germany) Borussia Dortmund	218
22	(Denmark) FC Midtjylland	203
23	Team China	26

Football clubs (Super Finals)
	Club	Points
1	(Belgium) R.S.C. Anderlecht	45
2	(Switzerland) FC Basel 1893	27
2	(Greece) Olympiacos CFP	27
4	(Italy) A.C. Milan	26
5	(China) Beijing Guoan	24
6	(England) Tottenham Hotspur	20
7	(England) Liverpool F.C.	12
8	(Portugal) F.C. Porto	10
9	(Italy) A.S. Roma	9
10	(France) GD Bordeaux	7
11	(Brazil) CR Flamengo	6
12	(Turkey) Galatasaray S.K.	5
13	(France) Olympique Lyonnais	4
13	(Netherlands) PSV Eindhoven	4
15	(Brazil) SC Corinthians	2
15	(Spain) Sevilla FC	2
17	(Spain) Atlético Madrid	1
18	(Scotland) Rangers F.C.	0
18	(Portugal) Sporting CP	0
20	(United Arab Emirates) Al Ain	-
20	(Germany) Borussia Dortmund	-
20	(Denmark) FC Midtjylland	-
20	Team China	-

- The highest percentage of points scored (relative to maximum points available) in a season was 413 by Beijing Guoan in 2008. Liverpool F.C. scored 412 points in 2009. With eleven points-scoring race weekends in 2010 instead of just six in previous years, champions R.S.C. Anderlecht scored 699 points, including points earned from Super Finals.
