= List of Superleague Formula seasons =

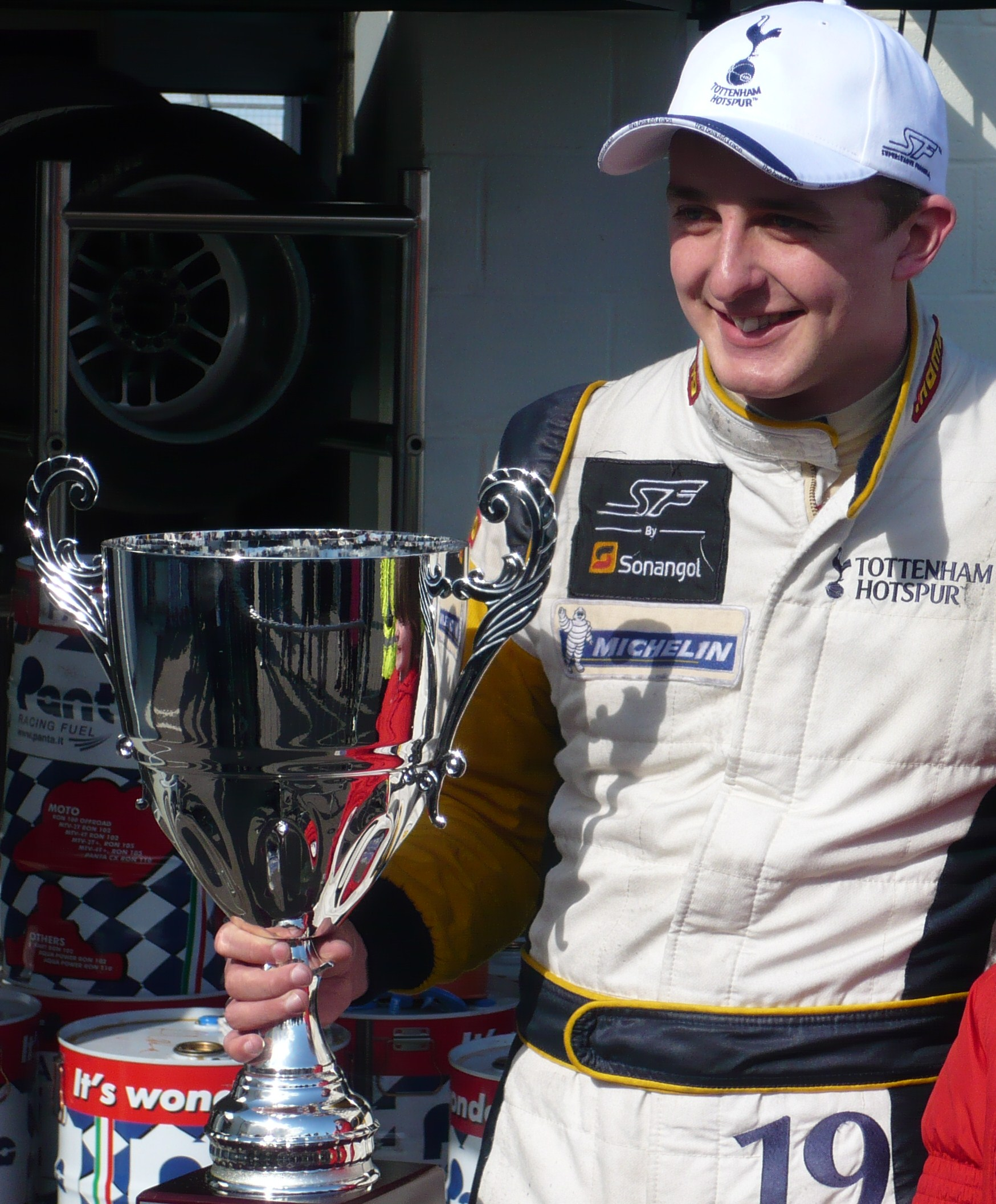
Craig Dolby holding one of his race winning trophies at the 2010 Silverstone Superleague Formula round

This is a list of Superleague Formula seasons, that is a list of the Superleague Formula championship seasons since the inaugural 2008 season. This list is accurate up to and including the 2010 season.

== Summary ==
Season	Rounds	Races*	Entrants	Teams	Drivers
2008	6	12	18	11	25
2009	6	16 (4)	19	9	26
2010	12 †	35 (11) ‡	19	11	35
2011	2	6 (2)	16	4	17

* Total races (race 1, 2 and Super Final). Number of which are Super Finals indicated in brackets.
† The round at Beijing was a non-championship event with no points given out for any of the races.
‡ The Super Final at Beijing was cancelled due to poor track and weather conditions.

=== Football clubs ===
Season	Champion	Second	Third
2008	(China) Beijing Guoan (413 pts)	(Netherlands) PSV Eindhoven (337 pts)	(Italy) A.C. Milan (335 pts)
2009	(England) Liverpool F.C. (412 pts)	(England) Tottenham Hotspur (382 pts)	(Switzerland) FC Basel 1893 (308 pts)
2010	(Belgium) R.S.C. Anderlecht (699 pts)	(England) Tottenham Hotspur (697 pts)	(Switzerland) FC Basel 1893 (667 pts)
2011	Team Australia (158 pts)	Team Japan (136 pts)	Team Luxembourg (134 pts)

=== Drivers ===
Season	Champion	Second	Third
2008	(Italy) Davide Rigon	(Netherlands) Yelmer Buurman	(Netherlands) Robert Doornbos
2009	(Spain) Adrián Vallés	(United Kingdom) Craig Dolby	(Germany) Max Wissel
2010	(Italy) Davide Rigon	(United Kingdom) Craig Dolby	(Germany) Max Wissel
2011	(Australia) John Martin	(United Kingdom) Duncan Tappy (Netherlands) Robert Doornbos	(Belgium) Frédéric Vervisch

=== Race teams ===
Season	Champion	Second	Third
2008	(Germany) Zakspeed	(Italy) Scuderia Playteam	(Belgium) Azerti Motorsport
2009	(United Kingdom) Hitech Junior Team	(United Kingdom) Alan Docking Racing	(Germany) GU-Racing International
2010	(Germany) GU-Racing International	(United Kingdom) Alan Docking Racing	(United Kingdom) Atech GP/Reid Motorsport
2011	(United Kingdom) Atech Reid Grand Prix	(United Kingdom) Alan Docking Racing	(Belgium) Azerti Motorsport
