= Superleague Formula round Belgium =

- Circuit Zolder

Event information
- No. of events: 3
- First held: 2008
- Last held: 2010
- Most wins (club): 7 different clubs 1
- Most wins (driver): (Italy) Davide Rigon 2

Last event (2010 Zolder) winners
| Race 1 | (Greece) Olympiacos CFP | Chris van der Drift |
| Race 2 | (Italy) A.S. Roma | Julien Jousse |
| S. Final | (Belgium) R.S.C. Anderlecht | Davide Rigon |

The Superleague Formula round Belgium is a round of the Superleague Formula. Zolder exclusively holds Superleague Formula events in Belgium. Zolder has hosted events in 2008 and 2009.

== Winners ==
| Season | Race | Club | Driver | Location | Date | Report |
|---|---|---|---|---|---|---|
| 2008 | R1 | (England) Liverpool F.C. | (Spain) Adrián Vallés | Circuit Zolder | October 5 | Report |
| 2008 | R2 | (China) Beijing Guoan | (Italy) Davide Rigon | Circuit Zolder | October 5 | Report |
| 2009 | R1 | (England) Tottenham Hotspur | (United Kingdom) Craig Dolby | Circuit Zolder | July 19 | Report |
| 2009 | R2 | (United Arab Emirates) Al Ain | (Argentina) Esteban Guerrieri | Circuit Zolder | July 19 | Report |
| 2010 | R1 | (Greece) Olympiacos CFP | (New Zealand) Chris van der Drift | Circuit Zolder | July 18 | Report |
| 2010 | R2 | (Italy) A.S. Roma | (France) Julien Jousse | Circuit Zolder | July 18 | Report |
| 2010 | SF | (Belgium) R.S.C. Anderlecht | (Italy) Davide Rigon | Circuit Zolder | July 18 | Report |
| 2011 | R1 | | | Circuit Zolder | July 17 | Report |
| 2011 | R2 | | | Circuit Zolder | July 17 | Report |
| 2011 | SF | | | Circuit Zolder | July 17 | Report |
