= Superleague Formula round UK =

(United Kingdom) Superleague Formula round UK
- Brands Hatch / Donington Park / Silverstone Circuit

Event information
- No. of events: 4
- First held: 2008
- Last held: 2010
- Most wins (club): (China) Beijing Guoan 3
- Most wins (driver): (Australia) John Martin 3

Last event (2010 Brands Hatch) winners
Race 1	(China) Beijing Guoan	John Martin
Race 2	(Netherlands) PSV Eindhoven	Narain Karthikeyan
S. Final	(China) Beijing Guoan	John Martin

The Superleague Formula round UK is a round of the Superleague Formula. Donington Park hosted events in 2008 and 2009. In 2010 Brands Hatch and the Silverstone Circuit will both host events.

== Winners ==
Season	Race	Club	Driver	Location	Date	Report
2008	R1	(China) Beijing Guoan	(Italy) Davide Rigon	Donington Park	31 August	Report
2008	R2	(Spain) Sevilla FC	(Spain) Borja García	Donington Park	31 August	Report
2009	R1	(Switzerland) FC Basel 1893	(Germany) Max Wissel	Donington Park	2 August	Report
2009	R2	(Portugal) F.C. Porto	(France) Tristan Gommendy	Donington Park	2 August	Report
2009	SF	(Scotland) Rangers F.C.	(Australia) John Martin	Donington Park	2 August	Report
2010	R1	(England) Tottenham Hotspur	(United Kingdom) Craig Dolby	Silverstone Circuit	4 April	Report
2010	R2	(France) Olympique Lyonnais	(France) Sébastien Bourdais	Silverstone Circuit	4 April	Report
2010	SF	(England) Tottenham Hotspur	(United Kingdom) Craig Dolby	Silverstone Circuit	4 April	Report
2010	R1	(China) Beijing Guoan	(Australia) John Martin	Brands Hatch	1 August	Report
2010	R2	(Netherlands) PSV Eindhoven	(India) Narain Karthikeyan	Brands Hatch	1 August	Report
2010	SF	(China) Beijing Guoan	(Australia) John Martin	Brands Hatch	1 August	Report
