= Galatasaray S.K. (Superleague Formula team) =

Galatasaray S.K. SF Racing Team
Founded	2008
Country	Turkey
Driver(s)	Alessandro Pier Guidi (2008); Duncan Tappy (2009); Scott Mansell (2009); Ho-Pin Tung (2009); Tristan Gommendy (2010); Andy Soucek (2010); Giacomo Ricci (2010); Chris van der Drift (2010)
First race	2008 Donington
Last race	2010 Navarra
Rounds	24
Ch'ships	0
Total points	874 (including Super Finals)
2010 position	13th (358 pts)
Races / Poles / Wins / Podiums / F. Laps; 47 / 0 / 1 / 6 / 1
NOTE - Data not including Super Finals

Galatasaray S.K. Superleague Formula team is the Superleague Formula racing team of Galatasaray SK, a multisports club, famous for its football section that competes in Turkey in the Süper Lig. The team competes in the Superleague Formula. It was operated in 2008 by Scuderia Playteam but in 2009 Ultimate Motorsport will run the team. Galatasaray belongs to French Barazi-Epsilon race team in 2010 season and the race driver will be Tristan Gommendy from France.

== 2008 season ==
In the 2008 Superleague Formula season Galatasaray finished a respectable 8th place in the standings. Alessandro Pier Guidi drove the car in all rounds. The best finish for Galatasaray was 3rd which they posted 3 times.

SF Round	Country	Location	Date	Driver	Race 1(pts)	Race 2(pts)	Race Total(pts)
1	England	Donington Park	30–31 August 2008	Alessandro Pier Guidi	12	12	24
2	Germany	Nürburgring	20–21 September 2008	Alessandro Pier Guidi	40	26	90
3	Belgium	Zolder	4–5 October 2008	Alessandro Pier Guidi	10	14	114
4	Portugal	Estoril Circuit	18–19 October 2008	Alessandro Pier Guidi	26	40	180
5	Italy	Vallelunga Circuit	1–2 November 2008	Alessandro Pier Guidi	40	16	236
6	Spain	Circuito Permanente de Jerez	1–2 November 2008	Alessandro Pier Guidi	5	36	277

== 2009 season ==
For the 2009 Superleague Formula season Duncan Tappy has been announced the driver.

SF Round	Country	Location	Date	Driver	Race 1(pts)	Race 2(pts)	Race 3	Race Total(pts)
1	France	Circuit de Nevers Magny-Cours	28 June 2009	Duncan Tappy	32	16	DNQ	48
2	Belgium	Zolder	19 July 2009	Duncan Tappy	20	7	N/A	75
3	England	Donington Park	2 August 2009	Scott Mansell	12	14	DNQ	101
4	Portugal	Estoril Circuit	6 September 2009	Ho Pin Tung	17	7	DNQ	133
5	Italy	Autodromo Nazionale Monza	4 October 2009	Ho Pin Tung	8	7	N/A	182
6	Spain	Circuito Permanente Del Jarama	8 November 2009	Ho Pin Tung	16	1	4	239

== Record ==
(key)

=== 2008 ===
Operator(s)	Driver(s)	1		2		3		4		5		6		Points	Rank
Operator(s)	Driver(s)	DON		NÜR		ZOL		EST		VAL		JER		Points	Rank
Scuderia Playteam	(Italy) Alessandro Pier Guidi	13	13	3	7	14	12	7	3	3	11	18	4	277	8th

=== 2009 ===
- Super Final results in 2009 did not count for points towards the main championship.

Operator(s)	Driver(s)	1			2			3			4			5			6			Points	Rank
Operator(s)	Driver(s)	MAG			ZOL			DON			EST			MOZ			JAR			Points	Rank
Ultimate Motorsport	(United Kingdom) Duncan Tappy	5	11	X	9	16	–													239	11th
Ultimate Motorsport	(United Kingdom) Scott Mansell							13	12	X										239	11th
Ultimate Motorsport	(China) Ho-Pin Tung										17	7	X	8	7	–	16	1	4	239	11th

=== 2010 ===
Operator(s)	Driver(s)	1			2			3			4			5			6			7			8			9			10			NC			11			Points	Rank
Operator(s)	Driver(s)	SIL			ASS			MAG			JAR			NÜR			ZOL			BRH			ADR			POR			ORD			BEI			NAV			Points	Rank
Barazi-Epsilon	(France) Tristan Gommendy	14	14	X	8	8	X	14	9	X	13	14	X	9	3	5	14	3	4	8	17	X	9	13	X													358	13th
GU-Racing International	(Spain) Andy Soucek																									9	5	X										358	13th
GU-Racing International	(Italy) Giacomo Ricci																												13	DN	X	12	12	C				358	13th
Drivex	(New Zealand) Chris van der Drift																																		17	7	X	358	13th

== Gallery ==
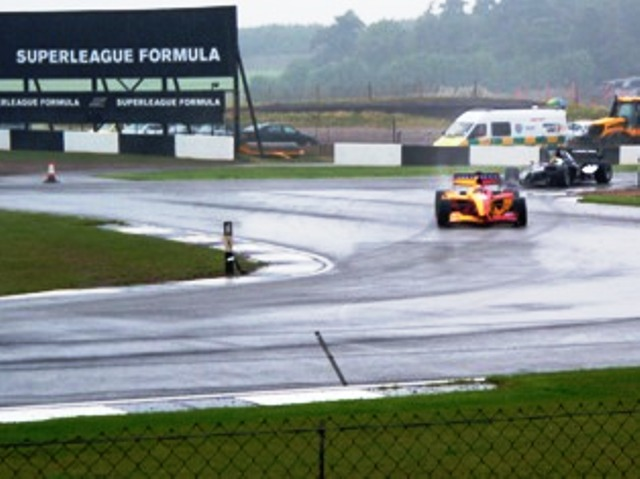
2008 Season Donington Park

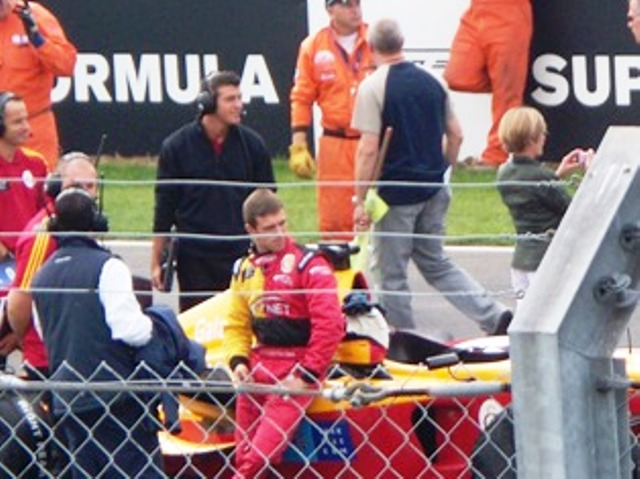
2008 Season Donington Park - Alessandro Pier Guidi

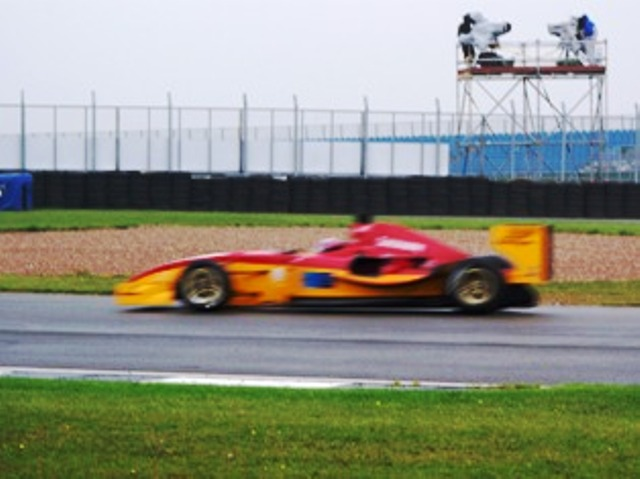
2008 Donington Park

2008 Donington Park Video

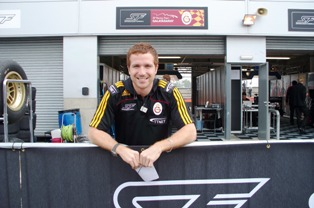
2008 Jason Tahincioglu

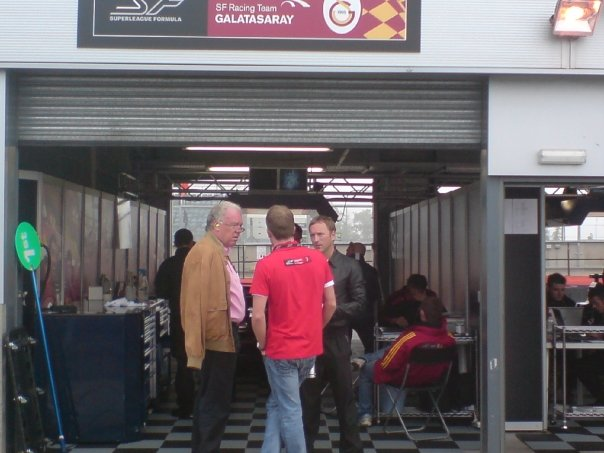
2008 Pit

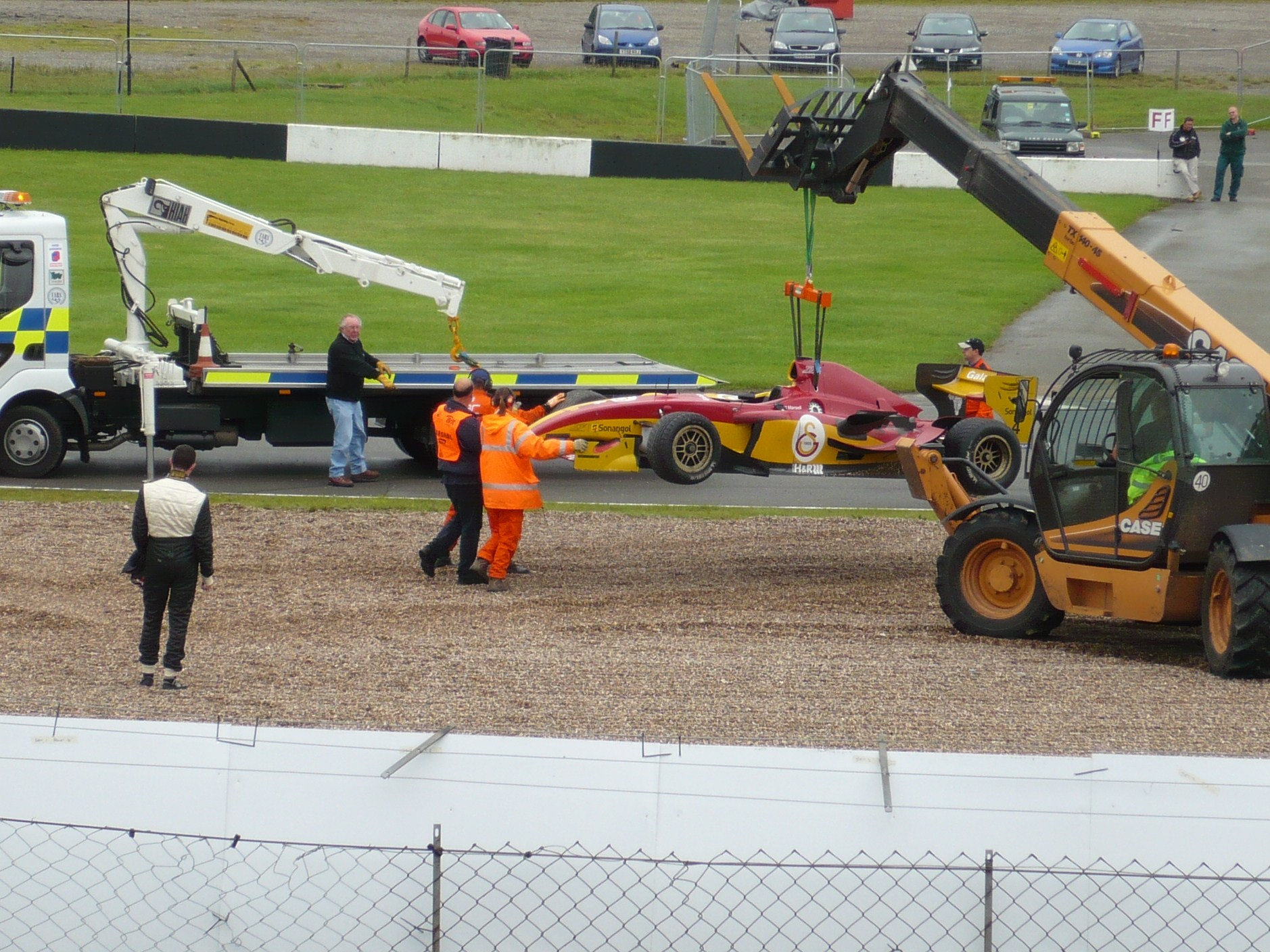
Scott Mansell's Galatasaray car retrieved during practice at Donington Park (2009)

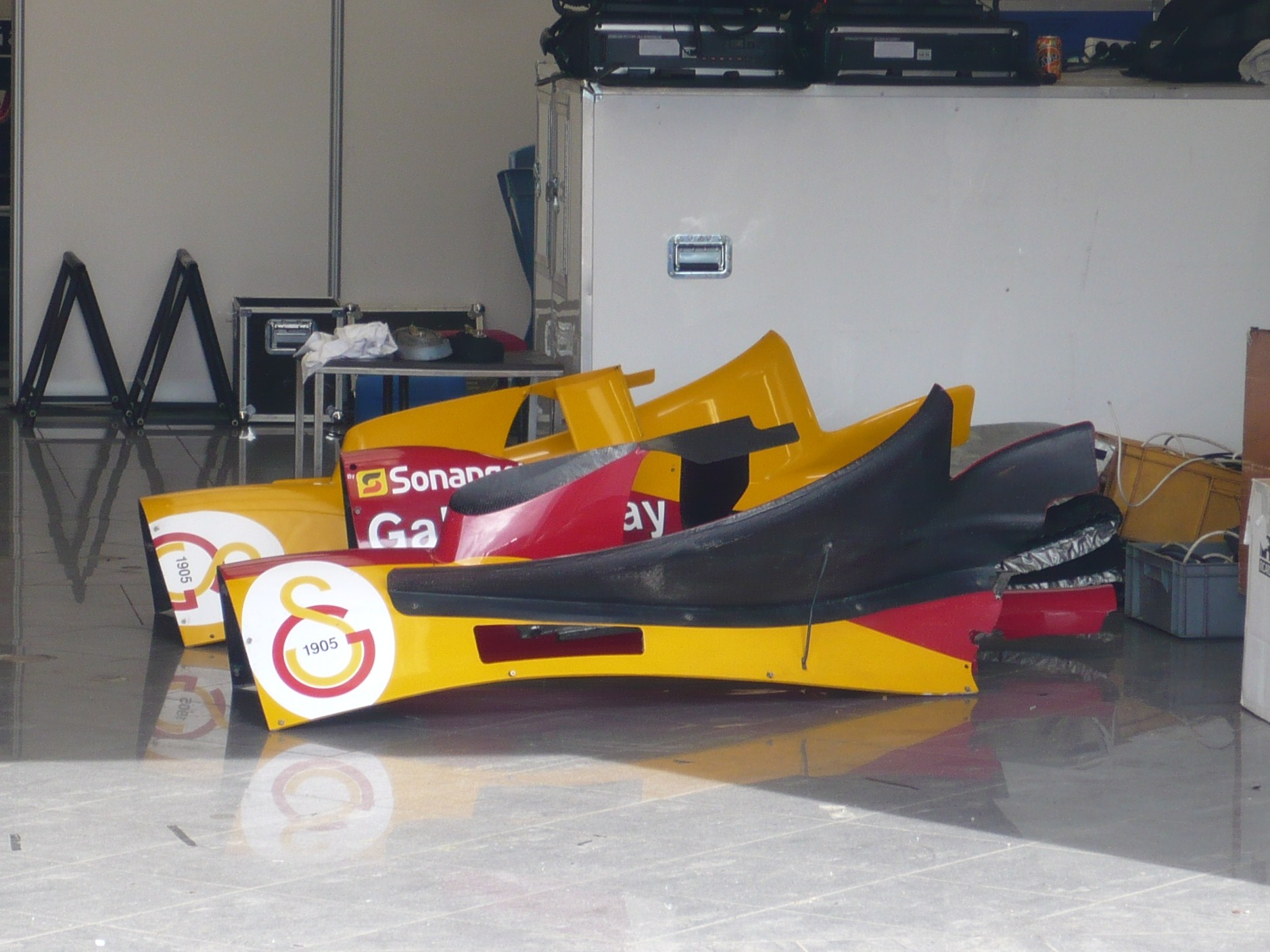
Some Galatasaray carbon-fibre car parts in the garage at Silverstone Circuit (2010)
