= Adrián Vallés =

Spanish racing driver

- Nationality: (Spain) Spanish
- Born: Adrián Vallés Escortell; 3 June 1986 (age 40) Teulada, Alicante, Spain

Previous series
- 2008, 2008–09 2008–09 2008 2006–07 2006, 2008 2003 2003 2002 2002 2001: GP2 Asia Series; Superleague Formula; Le Mans Series; Formula One test driver GP2 Series; World Series Lights; Spanish F3; Formula Junior 1600 Spain; Formula Nissan 2000; Formula Toyota 1300 Spain

Championship titles
- 2009 2002: Superleague Formula; Formula Junior 1600 Spain

Adrián Vallés Escortell (born 3 June 1986) is a Spanish former race car driver.

== Career ==
Vallés was born in Teulada, Alicante. After a strong karting career, he drove in Spanish Formula Three, before moving to the World Series by Nissan in 2004. The series was renamed World Series by Renault in 2005 while he continued in the series, finishing second in the standings with two race wins. In 2006, he started racing in the GP2 Series with Campos Racing, and also tested for the MF1 Racing Formula One team on 19 September. The team was bought out by Spyker and on 30 January 2007 Vallés was named the team's official reserve driver.

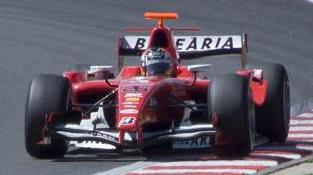
Vallés driving for BCN Competicion at the Magny-Cours round of the 2008 GP2 Series season

Vallés returned to GP2 for 2008, driving for the FMS International team in the GP2 Asia Series. He remained with the team for the first round of the 2008 GP2 Series season, but then switched to BCN Competicion. He elected to miss the final round of the season at Monza to focus on his sportscar commitments. Vallés returned to the GP2 Asia Series, by replacing Chris van der Drift (racing for A1 Team New Zealand at their home round of the 2008–09 A1 Grand Prix season at Taupo Motorsport Park) at Trident Racing for the third round of the season in Bahrain. Vallés and van der Drift would later team up to be the drivers for Epsilon Euskadi in the 2009 World Series by Renault season.

Additionally, Vallés has begun a sportscar career in 2008 with Epsilon Euskadi by driving in the 2008 24 Hours of Le Mans and the 2008 1000km of Silverstone.

Vallés moved on to team management in 2013 with his AV Formula team entering the 2013 Formula Renault 3.5 Series season with Arthur Pic and Yann Cunha as their drivers.

== Formula One ==
Vallés took part in testing at Silverstone in September 2006 testing for 2007 team Spyker although at the time they were Midland F1. He was then confirmed at test driver for Midland for 2006. He tested for Spyker in 2007.

On 3 February 2010, the Spanish press said that Vallés could be the partner of Argentine driver José María López in the USF1 team. Later, Vallés would not reach an agreement when the American team went bankrupt even before it was created.

== Superleague Formula ==
On 8 November 2009, Valles clinched the 2009 title with a solid fourth place for Liverpool in the final race of the season in Jarama.

== Racing record ==
=== Career summary ===
Season	Series	Team	Races	Wins	Poles	F.Laps	Podiums	Points	Position
2001	Formula Toyota 1300 Spain	?	8	1	2	?	6	?	**3rd**
2002	Formula Junior 1600 Spain	Escuela Lois Circuit	12	8	10	?	11	198	**1st**
2002	Formula Nissan 2000 Series	Escuela Lois Circuit	6	0	1	0	2	38	10th
2003	World Series Lights	Escuela Lois Circuit	16	3	2	2	4	126	4th
2003	Spanish Formula Three Championship	Pons Racing	1	0	0	0	0	0	NC
2004	World Series by Nissan	Pons Racing	16	0	0	1	3	46	10th
2005	Formula Renault 3.5 Series	Pons Racing	17	2	1	1	6	116	**2nd**
2006	GP2 Series	Campos Racing	21	0	0	2	1	9	16th
2006	Formula One	Spyker MF1 Racing	Test Driver						
2007	Formula One	Etihad Aldar Spyker F1 Team	Test Driver						
2008	GP2 Series	Fisichella Motor Sport International	18	0	0	1	0	5	21st
2008	GP2 Asia Series	Fisichella Motor Sport International	10	0	0	0	1	19	7th
2008	Le Mans Series	Epsilon Euskadi	2	0	0	0	0	0	NC
2008	24 Hours of Le Mans	Epsilon Euskadi	1	0	0	0	0	0	NC
2008	Superleague Formula	Liverpool F.C.	12	2	2	1	3	325	4th
2008–09	GP2 Asia Series	Trident Racing	2	0	0	0	0	0	NC
2009	Formula Renault 3.5 Series	Epsilon Euskadi	8	0	0	0	1	19	17th
2009	Superleague Formula	Liverpool F.C.	15	2	0	1	7	412	**1st**
2010	Superleague Formula	Sporting CP	6	0	0	0	0	329	15th

=== Complete Formula Nissan 2000 Series/World Series Lights results ===
(key) (Races in bold indicate pole position) (Races in italics indicate fastest lap)

Year	Entrant	1	2	3	4	5	6	7	8	9	10	11	12	13	14	15	16	DC	Points
2002	Escuela Lois Circuit	VAL; 1	VAL; 2	JAR; 1	JAR; 2	ALB; 1	ALB; 2	MNZ; 1	MNZ; 2	MAG; 1; 6	MAG; 2 Ret	CAT; 1; 6	**CAT**; **2**; 3	VAL; 1; 9	VAL; 2; 3			10th	38
2003	Escuela Lois Circuit	**MNZ**; **1**; 1	**MNZ**; **2**; 1	LAU; 1; 1	LAU; 2; 2	MAG; 1; 6	MAG; 2 Ret	A1R; 1; 13	A1R; 2; 6	CAT; 1; 7	CAT; 2; 4	VAL; 1 Ret	VAL; 2 Ret	ALB; 1; 8	ALB; 2; 5	JAR; 1; 7	JAR; 2; 6	4th	126

=== Complete Spanish Formula Three Championship results ===
(key) (Races in bold indicate pole position) (Races in italics indicate fastest lap)

Year	Entrant	1	2	3	4	5	6	7	8	9	10	11	12	13	DC	Points
2003	Meycom Sport	ALB; 1	ALB; 2	JAR; 1	JAR; 2	JER; 1	JER; 2	EST; 1	EST; 2	VAL; 1	VAL; 2	JER	CAT; 1; 9	CAT; 2 DNS	NC	-

=== Complete World Series by Nissan/Formula Renault 3.5 Series results ===
(key) (Races in bold indicate pole position) (Races in italics indicate fastest lap)

Year	Entrant	1	2	3	4	5	6	7	8	9	10	11	12	13	14	15	16	17	18	DC	Points
2004	Pons Racing	JAR; 1; 15	JAR; 2; 10	ZOL; 1; 15	ZOL; 2; 8	MAG; 1; 7	MAG; 2; 9	VAL; 1; 14	VAL; 2 Ret	LAU; 1; 7	LAU; 2; 11	EST; 1; 3	EST; 2; 10	CAT; 1 Ret	CAT; 2; 2	VAL; 1; 6	VAL; 2; 9	JER; 1 Ret	JER; 2; 3	10th	56
2005	Pons Racing	ZOL; 1; 6	ZOL; 2; 6	MON; 1; 3	VAL; 1; 4	VAL; 2; 2	LMS; 1; 13	LMS; 2; 7	BIL; 1; 10	BIL; 2; 6	OSC; 1; 5	OSC; 2; 7	**DON**; **1**; 1	DON; 2; 2	EST; 1 Ret	EST; 2 Ret	MNZ; 1; 1	MNZ; 2; 2		**2nd**	**116**
2009	Epsilon Euskadi	**CAT**; **1**; 3	CAT; 2; 4	SPA; 1 DNS	SPA; 2 Ret	MON; 1; 8	HUN; 1; 16	HUN; 2 Ret	SIL; 1; 12	SIL; 2; 14	BUG; 1	BUG; 2	ALG; 1	ALG; 2	NÜR; 1	NÜR; 2	ALC; 1	ALC; 2		17th	19

=== Complete GP2 Series results ===
(key) (Races in bold indicate pole position) (Races in italics indicate fastest lap)

Year	Entrant	1	2	3	4	5	6	7	8	9	10	11	12	13	14	15	16	17	18	19	20	21	DC	Points
2006	Campos Racing	VAL; FEA; 3	VAL; SPR; Ret	IMO; FEA; 9	IMO; SPR; Ret	NÜR; FEA; Ret	NÜR; SPR; 14	CAT; FEA; 18	CAT; SPR; 16	MON; FEA; Ret	SIL; FEA; 9	SIL; SPR; Ret	MAG; FEA; 15	MAG; SPR; 13	HOC; FEA; 18	HOC; SPR; Ret	HUN; FEA; Ret	HUN; SPR; 7	IST; FEA; Ret	IST; SPR; 14	MNZ; FEA; Ret	MNZ; SPR; 11	18th	7
2008	Fisichella Motor Sport International	CAT; FEA; 18	CAT; SPR; 11																				21st	5
2008	BCN Competición			IST; FEA; 10	IST; SPR; Ret	MON; FEA; 4	MON; SPR; 16	MAG; FEA; 15	MAG; SPR; 12	SIL; FEA; 22	SIL; SPR; 14	HOC; FEA; 15	HOC; SPR; Ret	HUN; FEA; Ret	HUN; SPR; 19	VAL; FEA; 11	VAL; SPR; Ret	SPA; FEA; 13	SPA; SPR; 13	MNZ; FEA; WD	MNZ; SPR; WD		21st	5

==== Complete GP2 Asia Series results ====
(key) (Races in bold indicate pole position) (Races in italics indicate fastest lap)

Year	Entrant	1	2	3	4	5	6	7	8	9	10	11	12	DC	Points
2008	FMS International	DUB1; FEA; 4	DUB1; SPR; Ret	SEN; FEA; 2	SEN; SPR; 5	SEP; FEA; Ret	SEP; SPR; 20	BHR; FEA; 5	BHR; SPR; Ret	DUB2; FEA; Ret	DUB2; SPR; 10			7th	19
2008–09	Trident Racing	SHI; FEA	SHI; SPR	DUB; FEA	DUB; SPR	BHR1; FEA; Ret	BHR1; SPR; 19	LSL; FEA	LSL; SPR	SEP; FEA	SEP; SPR	BHR2; FEA	BHR2; SPR	40th	0

=== Complete Superleague Formula results ===
(key) (Races in bold indicate pole position) (Races in italics indicate fastest lap)

Year	Team	1	2	3	4	5	6	7	8	9	10	11	12	13	14	15	16	17	18	19	20	21	22	23	24	Pos	Pts
2008	Liverpool F.C. Hitech Junior Team	DON; 1; 5	DON; 2; 3	NÜR; 1; 14	NÜR; 2; 14	ZOL; 1; 1	ZOL; 2; 6	EST; 1; 1	EST; 2; 12	**VLL**; **1**; 9	VLL; 2; 4	**JER**; **1**; 7	JER; 2; 15													4th	325
2009	Liverpool F.C. Hitech Junior Team	MAG; 1; 1	MAG; 2; 6	ZOL; 1; 3	ZOL; 2; 3	DON; 1; 6	DON; 2; 6	EST; 1; 2	EST; 2; 9	MNZ; 1; 4	MNZ; 2; 5	JAR; 1; 7	JAR; 2; 4													1st	412
2010	Sporting CP EmiliodeVillota Motorsport	SIL; 1	SIL; 2	ASS; 1	ASS; 2	MAG; 1	MAG; 2	JAR; 1	JAR; 2	NÜR; 1	NÜR; 2	ZOL; 1	ZOL; 2	BRH; 1	BRH; 2	ADR; 1	ADR; 2	POR; 1	POR; 2	ORD; 1; 16	ORD; 2; 5	BEI; 1; 5	BEI; 2; 9	NAV; 1; 10	NAV; 2; 17	15th	329

==== Super Final results ====
- Super Final results in 2009 did not count for points towards the main championship.

Year	Team	1	2	3	4	5	6	7	8	9	10	11	12
2009	**Liverpool F.C.** **Hitech Junior Team**	MAG; 1	ZOL; N/A	DON; DNQ	EST; 3	MNZ; N/A	JAR; 3						
2010	Sporting CP EmiliodeVillota Motorsport	SIL	ASS	MAG	JAR	NÜR	ZOL	BRH	ADR	POR	ORD; DNQ	BEI; C	NAV; DNQ

=== 24 Hours of Le Mans results ===
Year	Team	Co-Drivers	Car	Class	Laps	Pos.	Class Pos.
2008	(Spain) Epsilon Euskadi	(Spain) Ángel Burgueño (Spain) Miguel Ángel de Castro	Epsilon Euskadi EE1-Judd	LMP1	189	DNF	DNF

Sporting positions
Preceded by Davide Rigon (Beijing Guoan)	Superleague Formula champion (Liverpool F.C.); 2009	Succeeded by Davide Rigon (R.S.C. Anderlecht)
