= Duncan Tappy =

English racing driver

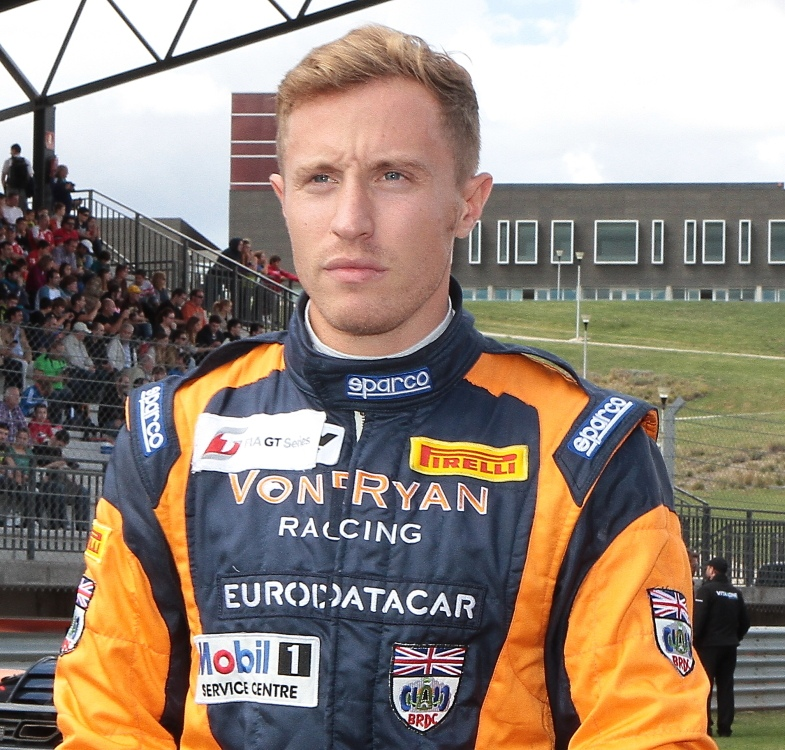
- Nationality: (United Kingdom) British
- Born: Duncan Charles Tappy; 26 June 1984 (age 42) West Ewell, England

European Le Mans Series career
- Debut season: 2008
- Current team: United Autosports
- Categorisation: FIA Gold (until 2018, 2023–); FIA Silver (2019–2022)
- Former teams: Rollcentre Racing
- Starts: 18
- Wins: 1
- Poles: 1
- Fastest laps: 0
- Best finish: 4th in 2022

Previous series
- 2003 2004 2005 2006–07 2007 2007 2008 2008 2009 2009: Zip Formula; UK Formula Ford W. Series; British Formula Ford; British Formula Renault 2.0; French Formula Renault; Formula Renault NEC; Porsche Carrera Cup GB; World Series by Renault; Firestone Indy Lights; International Formula Master

Championship titles
- 2005 2007: Formula Ford Festival; British Formula Renault 2.0

Duncan Charles Tappy (born 26 June 1984 in West Ewell, Surrey) is a British professional racing driver and stunt driver.

== Racing career ==
=== Early career ===
Tappy began his racing career in karting, finishing runner-up in the 2004 UK Formula Ford championship winter series. In 2005, he took part in the full UK Formula Ford season with Jamun Racing, taking ten victories to finish second in the standings. During this year, he also won the end-of-season Formula Ford Festival and was selected as a finalist for the prestigious McLaren Autosport BRDC award.

In 2006, Tappy stepped up to the British Formula Renault 2.0 Championship with Jamun Racing, finishing his debut year eighteenth in the standings. He was also awarded 'Rising Star' status by the British Racing Drivers Club. He transferred to Fortec Motorsport for the 2007 season, taking sixteen podium finishes, including nine race wins, to end the year as series champion.

At the end of the season, Tappy was named as British Club Driver of the Year at the annual Autosport Awards and once again nominated for the McLaren Autosport BRDC Award.

=== Single seater racing ===
Following his Formula Renault championship season, Tappy raced in a number of single-seater championships between 2008 and 2011, most notably Superleague Formula where he competed in each of the four seasons and was part of the Japan team that finished runner-up in the truncated final season. In 2010, he won the Auto GP teams title with DAMS and finished third in the driver standings. Other outings came in World Series by Renault, the Firestone Indy Lights Series and International Formula Master. In early 2008, Tappy also made two appearances as a rookie driver for A1 Team Great Britain in Mexico City and Shanghai.

=== Sports cars ===
In April 2008, Tappy made his sportscar debut when he took part in the Monza 1000km Le Mans Series event. Driving a Pescarolo Judd for Rollcentre Racing, he finished the race in seventh position.

Tappy returned to sports car racing in 2012, competing in the Blancpain Endurance Series for ART Grand Prix alongside Grégoire Demoustier. The pair finished fifth in the Pro-Am Cup with a win in Navarre. From 2012 to 2017, he raced in a number of different GT3 championships, including further Blancpain Endurance Series campaigns, the British GT Championship, GT Asia and International GT Open.

Since the 2018 season, Tappy has competed in the LMP3 class of the Michelin Le Mans Cup, the European Le Mans Series and the Asian Le Mans Series. Partnering Michael Benham in the Michelin Le Mans Cup for Lanan Racing, he took a class win at Le Mans in 2018 and won three times in 2019 resulting in a third place end of season standing. In 2020, he signed with United Autosports, and finished fourth in the 2021 Asian Le Mans Series. He last competed in 2022.

== Stunt driving ==
Tappy served as a stunt driver in F1 (2025), Transformers: The Last Knight (2017), and The Sweeney (2012).

== Racing record ==
=== Career summary ===
Season	Series	Team	Races	Wins	Poles	F/Laps	Podiums	Points	Position
2003	Zip Formula Great Britain	?	?	?	?	?	?	48	11th
2004	British Formula Ford Championship Winter Series	Steve Mole Motorsport	?	?	?	?	?	?	**2nd**
2005	British Formula Ford Championship	Jamun Racing	20	10	5	3	17	479	**2nd**
2006	British Formula Renault 2.0	Jamun Racing	16	0	0	0	0	101	18th
2007	British Formula Renault 2.0	Fortec Motorsport	20	9	7	9	16	512	**1st**
2007	Formula Renault 2.0 Northern European Cup	Fortec Motorsport	2	0	0	0	1	30	33rd
2007	French Formula Renault 2.0	Fortec Motorsport	1	0	1	0	1	0	NC
2008	Le Mans Series - LMP1	Rollcentre Racing	1	0	0	0	0	2	14th
2008	Porsche Carrera Cup Great Britain	Porsche Motorsport	2	0	0	0	0	0	NC
2008	Formula Renault 3.5 Series	RC Motorsport	8	0	0	0	0	6	23rd
2008	Superleague Formula	Tottenham Hotspur	10	0	0	0	3	257†	11th†
2009	International Formula Master	Team JVA	2	0	0	0	0	0	22nd
2009	Indy Lights	Genoa Racing	2	0	0	0	0	8	32nd
2009	Superleague Formula	Galatasaray S.K.	4	0	0	0	0	133†	16th†
2010	Auto GP	DAMS	12	0	0	0	2	37	**3rd**
2010	Superleague Formula	Galatasaray S.K.	11	0	0	1	5	540†	6th†
2011	Superleague Formula	Japan	3	1	0	0	1	136†	**2nd**†
2011	Superleague Formula	Turkey - Galatasaray S.K.	2	0	0	0	0	88†	10th†
2012	Blancpain Endurance Series - Pro-Am	ART Grand Prix	6	1	0	0	2	58	5th
2013	British GT Championship - GT3	Von Ryan Racing	6	0	0	0	2	54	13th
2013	FIA GT Series - Pro-Am	Von Ryan Racing	2	0	0	0	0	0	NC
2013	Blancpain Endurance Series - Pro-Am	Black Falcon	2	0	0	0	0	8	35th
2014	Blancpain Endurance Series - Pro	M-Sport Bentley	5	0	0	0	0	15	17th
2015	GT Cup UK - GTO		1	0	0	0	1	0	NC
2015	GT Asia - GT3	Bentley Team Absolute	11	1	1	0	1	96	7th
2016	Intercontinental GT Challenge	Garage 59	1	0	0	0	0	1	18th
2016	Blancpain Endurance Series	Garage 59	2	0	0	0	0	0	NC
2016	International GT Open	Garage 59	12	1	1	1	3	31	8th
2016	GT Asia - GT3	Bentley Team Absolute	8	0	0	1	4	88	9th
2017	International GT Open	Garage 59	12	1	1	0	4	44	7th
2017	Le Mans Cup - GT3	Garage 59	2	0	0	0	1	13	13th
2018	Le Mans Cup - LMP3	Lanan Racing	7	1	1	0	1	29.5	8th
2019	Le Mans Cup - LMP3	Lanan Racing	6	3	0	0	4	91.5	**2nd**
2020	European Le Mans Series - LMP3	United Autosports	5	0	0	0	1	46.5	6th
2020	Le Mans Cup - LMP3	United Autosports	2	0	0	0	0	0	NC
2021	Asian Le Mans Series - LMP3	United Autosports	4	0	0	0	3	58	**2nd**
2021	European Le Mans Series - LMP3	United Autosports	6	0	1	0	0	11.5	25th
2021	Le Mans Cup - LMP3	United Autosports	2	0	0	0	0	4.5	26th
2022	European Le Mans Series - LMP2	United Autosports	6	1	0	0	2	73	4th
2022	IMSA SportsCar Championship - LMP2	United Autosports	1	0	0	0	0	284	21st
2022	Le Mans Cup - LMP3	Cool Racing							
2023	GT Cup Championship - Group GT3	Greystone GT	1	0	0	0	0	0	NC
2024	McLaren Trophy Europe - Artura Trophy	Greystone GT							
2025	McLaren Trophy Europe	Greystone GT							

^{†} Team standings.
^{*} Season still in progress.

=== Complete Formula Renault 2.0 NEC results ===
(key) (Races in bold indicate pole position) (Races in italics indicate fastest lap)

Year	Entrant	1	2	3	4	5	6	7	8	9	10	11	12	13	14	15	16	DC	Points
2007	Fortec Motorsports	ZAN; 1	ZAN; 2	OSC; 1; 3	OSC; 2; 11	ASS; 1	ASS; 2	ZOL; 1	ZOL; 1	NUR; 1	NUR; 2	OSC; 1	OSC; 2	SPA; 1	SPA; 2	HOC; 1	HOC; 2	33rd	30

=== Complete Formula Renault 3.5 Series results ===
(key)

Year	Entrant	1	2	3	4	5	6	7	8	9	10	11	12	13	14	15	16	17	DC	Points
2008	RC Motorsport	MNZ; 1	MNZ; 2	SPA; 1	SPA; 2	MON; 1	SIL; 1; 16	SIL; 2; 21	HUN; 1; 6	HUN; 2; 19	NÜR; 1	NÜR; 2	BUG; 1	BUG; 2	EST; 1; 14	EST; 2; 11	CAT; 1; 10	CAT; 2 Ret	23rd	6

=== Superleague Formula record ===
==== 2008-2009 ====
(Races in bold indicate pole position) (Races in italics indicate fastest lap)

Year	Team	Operator	1		2		3		4	5		6		Position	Points
2008	Tottenham Hotspur	GTA Motor Competición	DON		NÜR		ZOL		EST	VAL		JER		11th	257
2008	Tottenham Hotspur	GTA Motor Competición	3	5	13	17	12	2		11	10	3	14	11th	257
2009	Galatasaray S.K.	Ultimate Motorsport	MAG		ZOL		DON		EST	MOZ		JAR		11th	239
2009	Galatasaray S.K.	Ultimate Motorsport	5	11	9	16								11th	239

==== 2009 Super Final results ====
- Super Final results in 2009 did not count for points towards the main championship.

Year	Team	1	2	3	4	5	6
2009	Galatasaray S.K. Ultimate Motorsport	MAG; DNQ	ZOL; N/A	DON	EST	MOZ	JAR

==== 2010-2011 ====
Year	Team	Operator	1			2			3	4	5	6			7			8			9			10	11	12	Position	Points
2010	CR Flamengo	Alpha	SIL			ASS			MAG	JAR	NÜR	ZOL			BRH			ADR			POR			ORD	BEI †	NAV	6th	540
2010	CR Flamengo	Alpha	3	12	X							17	**2**	X	9	3	**3**	10	3	X	8	7	X				6th	540
2011	Japan	Atech Reid Grand Prix	HOL			BEL																					**2nd**	**136**
2011	Japan	Atech Reid Grand Prix	7	1	**6**																						**2nd**	**136**
2011	Turkey – Galatasaray S.K.	EmiliodeVillota Motorsport				10	5	X																			10th	88

^{†} Non-championship event.

=== American open–wheel racing results ===
(key)

==== Indy Lights ====
Year	Team	1	2	3	4	5	6	7	8	9	10	11	12	13	14	15	Rank	Points
2009	Genoa Racing	STP; 25	STP; 27	LBH	KAN	INDY	MIL	IOW	WGL	TOR	EDM	KTY	MOH	SNM	CHI	HMS	32nd	8

=== Complete Auto GP results ===
(key)

Year	Entrant	1	2	3	4	5	6	7	8	9	10	11	12	Pos	Points
2010	DAMS	BRN; 1; 5	BRN; 2; 11	IMO; 1; 4	IMO; 2; 3	SPA; 1 Ret	SPA; 2; 9	MAG; 1; 2	MAG; 2; 4	NAV; 1; 4	NAV; 2; 4	MNZ; 1; 4	MNZ; 2; 11	3rd	37

=== Complete European Le Mans Series results ===
(key) (Races in bold indicate pole position; results in italics indicate fastest lap)

Year	Entrant	Class	Chassis	Engine	1	2	3	4	5	6	Rank	Points
2008	Rollcentre Racing	LMP1	Pescarolo 01	Judd GV5.5 S2 5.5 L V10	CAT	MNZ; 7	SPA	NÜR	SIL		29th	2
2020	United Autosports	LMP3	Ligier JS P320	Nissan VK56DE 5.6L V8	LEC; 7	SPA; 5	LEC; 2	MNZ; 11	ALG; 4		6th	46.5
2021	United Autosports	LMP3	Ligier JS P320	Nissan VK56DE 5.6L V8	**CAT**; 10	RBR; 9	LEC; 13	MNZ; 10	SPA; 8	ALG; 10	25th	11.5
2022	United Autosports	LMP2	Oreca 07	Gibson GK428 4.2 L V8	LEC; 7	IMO; 2	MNZ; 4	CAT; 4	SPA; 1	ALG; Ret	4th	73

=== Complete IMSA SportsCar Championship results ===
(key) (Races in bold indicate pole position; results in italics indicate fastest lap)

Year	Team	Class	Make	Engine	1	2	3	4	5	6	7	Pos.	Points
2022	United Autosports	LMP2	Oreca 07	Gibson GK428 V8	DAY	SEB; 5	LGA	MOH	WGL	ELK	PET	21st	283

Sporting positions
Preceded by Dan Clarke	Formula Ford Festival winner 2005	Succeeded by Richard Tannahill
Preceded by Sebastian Hohenthal	Formula Renault UK; Champion; 2007	Succeeded by Adam Christodoulou
Awards and achievements
Preceded by Sam Bird	Autosport; British Club Driver of the Year; 2007	Succeeded by Adam Christodoulou
