= 2010 Brands Hatch Superleague Formula round =

2010 European Superleague Formula round Superleague Formula round UK
- Circuit Map
- Date: 1 August, 2010
- Location: (United Kingdom) Brands Hatch, Kent, England
- Course: Permanent racing facility 2.613 mi (4.205 km)
- Laps: 36 & 29
Pole position
Team	(Spain) Sevilla FC	Marcos Martínez
- Time: 1:13.856
Podium (1st race)
First	(China) Beijing Guoan	John Martin
Second	(England) Tottenham Hotspur	Craig Dolby
Third	(Portugal) Sporting CP	Andy Soucek
Fastest lap (1st race)
Team	(England) Tottenham Hotspur	Craig Dolby
- Time: 1:13.460 (on lap 16)
Podium (2nd race)
First	(Netherlands) PSV Eindhoven	Narain Karthikeyan
Second	(Belgium) R.S.C. Anderlecht	Davide Rigon
Third	(Brazil) CR Flamengo	Duncan Tappy
Fastest lap (2nd race)
Team	(Brazil) CR Flamengo	Duncan Tappy
- Time: 1:14.023 (on lap 14)

The 2010 Brands Hatch Superleague Formula round was a Superleague Formula round, held on 1 August 2010 at the Brands Hatch circuit, Kent, England. It was Superleague Formula's first visit to the circuit and the second round of the 2010 season to be held in Britain, after the Silverstone round. It was the seventh round of the 2010 Superleague Formula season.

Eighteen clubs took part including English clubs Liverpool F.C. and Tottenham Hotspur. The other British SF club, Rangers F.C., were not competing that year.

Support races included the GT Cup, Formula Junior, and Lotus Cup Europe.

== Report ==
=== Race 2 ===
The race was red-flagged with about nine minutes left to run due a very large crash involving Olympiacos' Chris van der Drift who was sent to hospital with a broken ankle, two broken ribs, a cracked shoulder blade, a dislocated shoulder and two broken fingers. He had run into the back of A.S. Roma's Julien Jousse just after Surtees' bend, they touched wheels which sent van der Drift's car into the air hitting the side barrier and bridge before spinning down Pilgrim's Drop, temporarily on fire, to a stop with the car seriously damaged and nearby racers narrowly avoiding the wreckage. Van der Drift remembered the accident and interviewed a few days later put it down to "a racing incident... I'm still alive, so that's good".

== Results ==
=== Qualifying ===
- In each group, the top four qualify for the quarter-finals.

== Standings after the round ==
Pos	Team	Points
1	(Italy) A.C. Milan	463
2	(England) Tottenham Hotspur	461
3	(Belgium) R.S.C. Anderlecht	427
4	(Greece) Olympiacos CFP	406
5	(Switzerland) FC Basel 1893	405
