= 2009 Jarama Superleague Formula round =

2009 Jarama Superleague Formula round Superleague Formula round Spain
- Circuit Map
- Date: November 8, 2009
- Location: Circuito del Jarama, Spain
- Course: Permanent racing facility 2.115 mi (3.404 km)
- Laps: 34 & 31
Pole position
Team	(Spain) Sevilla FC	Sébastien Bourdais
- Time: 1:20.397
Podium (1st race)
First	(Belgium) R.S.C. Anderlecht	Yelmer Buurman
Second	(Spain) Sevilla FC	Sébastien Bourdais
Third	(Italy) A.C. Milan	Giorgio Pantano
Fastest lap (1st race)
Team	(Belgium) R.S.C. Anderlecht	Yelmer Buurman
- Time: 1:20.011 (on lap 13)
Podium (2nd race)
First	(Turkey) Galatasaray S.K.	Ho-Pin Tung
Second	(England) Tottenham Hotspur	Craig Dolby
Third	(Denmark) FC Midtjylland	Kasper Andersen
Fastest lap (2nd race)
Team	(Portugal) F.C. Porto	Tristan Gommendy
- Time: 1:20.650 (on lap 13)

The 2009 Jarama Superleague Formula round was the sixth round and last of the 2009 Superleague Formula season, with the races taking place on November 8, 2009.

== Report ==
=== Qualifying ===
For the final round of the year, 4 time Champ Car World Series champion and Formula One pointscorer Sébastien Bourdais clinched his first pole position in the Superleague Formula series.

=== Race 1 ===
At the start of the race FC Midtjylland (Kasper Andersen) and Rangers F.C. (John Martin) both ran off into the gravel trap at turn 1. This left FC Midtjylland stuck and Rangers F.C.s race severely compromised. Olympiacos CFP (Esteban Guerrieri) lost it on the exit of the corner, spinning out and nearly hitting the barrier, they rejoined the race within seconds. Atlético Madrid (María de Villota) spun out of the race on lap 2. Galatasaray S.K. (Ho-Pin Tung) were in 3rd place in the opening stage of the race before going straight on at turn 1 with reported brake failure. Sevilla FC (Sébastien Bourdais) built up a comfortable 3 second lead in the opening stage of the race, but spun the car before the first round of pit stops - amazingly still keeping his lead. Sevilla FC went to the pits one lap before R.S.C. Anderlecht (Yelmer Buurman) and when Anderlecht came out from their pit stop the two teams went side by side into the first corner. The Sevilla FC mysteriously slowed up midcorner giving R.S.C. Anderlecht a lead they would never relinquish, finishing ahead of Sevilla by 14 seconds. A.C. Milan (Giorgio Pantano) clinched the last podium spot. A couple of laps before the end of the race SC Corinthians (Antônio Pizzonia) suffered a suspected puncture after making contact with A.S. Roma which led to A.S. Roma (Julien Jousse) crashing into the back of him, while FC Basel 1893 (Max Wissel) had to take avoiding action allowing title challenger Tottenham Hotspur (Craig Dolby) to pass 3 cars to keep his slim title bid alive. Both A.S. Roma and SC Corinthians were given grid penalties for the 2nd race of the day.

=== Race 2 ===
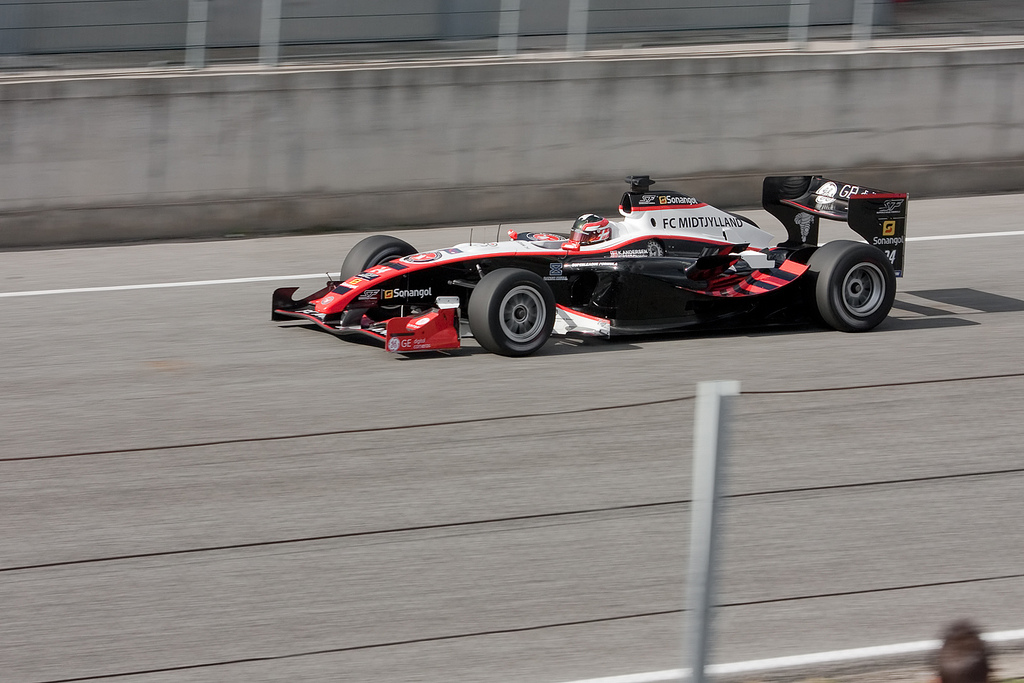
Kasper Andersen racing the FC Midtjylland entry at the weekend.

At the start of the race there were more problems. Olympiacos CFP (Esteban Guerrieri) locked up and went into the side of PSV Eindhoven (Carlo van Dam) and caused mayhem. Rangers F.C. (John Martin) had to take avoiding action and went into the gravel again. Several other cars had to take avoiding action including Tottenham Hotspur (Craig Dolby) and FC Basel 1893 (Max Wissel). SC Corinthians (Antônio Pizzonia) also got tangled up in the mess and were the only retirement on the opening lap with PSV Eindhoven.

Galatasaray S.K. (Ho-Pin Tung) passed FC Midtjylland (Kasper Andersen) on the restart. The race had several passes by the Tottenham Hotspur car including one on Sevilla FC (Sébastien Bourdais). When the pit stop window opened there was a crash in the pits when R.S.C. Anderlecht (Yelmer Buurman) and Olympique Lyonnais (Nelson Panciatici) collided. Race 1 winner R.S.C. Anderlecht was out the race from the incident.

In the end Galatasaray S.K. came home the winners for their first ever Superleague Formula win, Tottenham Hotspur finished 2nd and FC Midtjylland got their first Superleague Formula podium. Liverpool F.C. (Adrián Vallés) were crowned the 2009 champions.

=== Super Final ===
The 100,000 Euro Super Final was the last race of the season. Polesitter Tottenham Hotspur (Craig Dolby) stalled and were effectively out of the race at the start, coming in at the finish 6th and last some way behind. F.C. Porto (Tristan Gommendy) outbraked himself at the first corner and finished 5th. R.S.C. Anderlecht (Yelmer Buurman) jumped up from 5th to 1st at the first corner and would never give up the lead and won the race. Sevilla FC (Sébastien Bourdais) finished 2nd and the new champions Liverpool F.C. (Adrián Vallés) finished 3rd.

== Results ==
=== Qualifying ===
- In each group, the top four qualify for the quarter-finals.

==== Group A ====
Pos.	Team	Driver	Time
1	(Switzerland) FC Basel 1893	(Germany) Max Wissel	1:19.554
2	(Greece) Olympiacos CFP	(Argentina) Esteban Guerrieri	1:19.880
3	(Brazil) SC Corinthians	(Brazil) Antônio Pizzonia	1:19.883
4	(France) Olympique Lyonnais	(France) Nelson Panciatici	1:19.963
5	(Italy) A.S. Roma	(France) Julien Jousse	1:20.024
6	(Denmark) FC Midtjylland	(Denmark) Kasper Andersen	1:20.174
7	(Scotland) Rangers F.C.	(Australia) John Martin	1:20.211
8	(Portugal) F.C. Porto	(France) Tristan Gommendy	1:20.527
9	(Spain) Atlético Madrid	(Spain) María de Villota	1:21.870

==== Group B ====
Pos.	Team	Driver	Time
1	(Spain) Sevilla FC	(France) Sébastien Bourdais	1:19.734
2	(Turkey) Galatasaray S.K.	(China) Ho-Pin Tung	1:19.907
3	(Italy) A.C. Milan	(Italy) Giorgio Pantano	1:19.933
4	(Belgium) R.S.C. Anderlecht	(Netherlands) Yelmer Buurman	1:19.983
5	(England) Tottenham Hotspur	(United Kingdom) Craig Dolby	1:20.099
6	(Portugal) Sporting CP	(Portugal) Pedro Petiz	1:20.233
7	(England) Liverpool F.C.	(Spain) Adrián Vallés	1:20.424
8	(Brazil) CR Flamengo	(Brazil) Enrique Bernoldi	1:20.497
9	(Netherlands) PSV Eindhoven	(Netherlands) Carlo van Dam	1:20.909

==== Knockout stages ====
Quarter-Finals			Semi-Finals			Pole Shoot Out
A1	FC Basel 1893	1:20.433
B4	R.S.C. Anderlecht	1:20.389	B4	R.S.C. Anderlecht	1:20.484
A3	SC Corinthians	1:26.557	A3	SC Corinthians	1:20.720
B2	Galatasaray S.K.	1:48.061				B4	R.S.C. Anderlecht	1:20.403
A2	Olympiacos CFP	1:20.386				B1	Sevilla FC	1:20.397
B3	A.C. Milan	1:21.259	A2	Olympiacos CFP	1:21.141
A4	Olympique Lyonnais	1:21.262	B1	Sevilla FC	1:20.501
B1	Sevilla FC	1:20.289

==== Grid ====
Pos.	Team	Driver	Time
1	(Spain) Sevilla FC	(France) Sébastien Bourdais	1:20.397
2	(Belgium) R.S.C. Anderlecht	(Netherlands) Yelmer Buurman	1:20.403
3	(Greece) Olympiacos CFP	(Argentina) Esteban Guerrieri	1:21.141
4	(Brazil) SC Corinthians	(Brazil) Antônio Pizzonia	1:20.720
5	(Turkey) Galatasaray S.K.	(China) Ho-Pin Tung	1:48.061
6	(Italy) A.C. Milan	(Italy) Giorgio Pantano	1:21.259
7	(France) Olympique Lyonnais	(France) Nelson Panciatici	1:21.262
8	(Switzerland) FC Basel 1893	(Germany) Max Wissel	1:20.433
9	(Italy) A.S. Roma	(France) Julien Jousse	1:20.024
10	(England) Tottenham Hotspur	(United Kingdom) Craig Dolby	1:20.099
11	(Denmark) FC Midtjylland	(Denmark) Kasper Andersen	1:20.174
12	(Portugal) Sporting CP	(Portugal) Pedro Petiz	1:20.233
13	(Scotland) Rangers F.C.	(Australia) John Martin	1:20.211
14	(England) Liverpool F.C.	(Spain) Adrián Vallés	1:20.424
15	(Portugal) F.C. Porto	(France) Tristan Gommendy	1:20.527
16	(Brazil) CR Flamengo	(Brazil) Enrique Bernoldi	1:20.497
17	(Spain) Atlético Madrid	(Spain) María de Villota	1:21.870
18	(Netherlands) PSV Eindhoven	(Netherlands) Carlo van Dam	1:20.909

=== Race 1 ===
Pos	No	Team	Driver	Laps	Time/Retired	Grid	Pts.
1	8	(Belgium) R.S.C. Anderlecht	(Netherlands) Yelmer Buurman	34	46:32.409	2	50
2	18	(Spain) Sevilla FC	(France) Sébastien Bourdais	34	+ 14.048	1	45
3	3	(Italy) A.C. Milan	(Italy) Giorgio Pantano	34	+ 30.729	6	40
4	19	(England) Tottenham Hotspur	(United Kingdom) Craig Dolby	34	+ 35.924	10	36
5	10	(Switzerland) FC Basel 1893	(Germany) Max Wissel	34	+ 39.164	8	32
6	16	(Portugal) F.C. Porto	(France) Tristan Gommendy	34	+ 53.145	15	29
7	21	(England) Liverpool F.C.	(Spain) Adrián Vallés	34	+ 53.742	14	26
8	9	(Greece) Olympiacos CFP	(Argentina) Esteban Guerrieri	34	+ 56.171	3	23
9	69	(France) Olympique Lyonnais	(France) Nelson Panciatici	34	+ 1:00.262	7	20
10	17	(Scotland) Rangers F.C.	(Australia) John Martin	34	+ 1:04.524	13	18
11	7	(Brazil) CR Flamengo	(Brazil) Enrique Bernoldi	34	+ 1:13.243	16	16
12	5	(Netherlands) PSV Eindhoven	(Netherlands) Carlo van Dam	34	+ 1:16.659	18	14
13	2	(Portugal) Sporting CP	(Portugal) Pedro Petiz	33	+ 1 lap	12	12
14	14	(Brazil) SC Corinthians	(Brazil) Antônio Pizzonia	31	Acc. Damage	4	10
15	22	(Italy) A.S. Roma	(France) Julien Jousse	31	Acc. Damage	9	8
16	4	(Turkey) Galatasaray S.K.	(China) Ho-Pin Tung	7	Brakes	5	7
17	15	(Spain) Atlético Madrid	(Spain) María de Villota	1	Spun off	17	6
18	24	(Denmark) FC Midtjylland	(Denmark) Kasper Andersen	0	Spun off	11	5
Fastest lap: Yelmer Buurman (R.S.C Anderlecht) 1:20.011 (107.63 mph)

=== Race 2 ===
Pos	No	Team	Driver	Laps	Time/Retired	Grid	Pts.
1	4	(Turkey) Galatasaray S.K.	(China) Ho-Pin Tung	31	45:42.682	3	50
2	19	(England) Tottenham Hotspur	(United Kingdom) Craig Dolby	31	+ 3.895	15	45
3	24	(Denmark) FC Midtjylland	(Denmark) Kasper Andersen	31	+ 8.897	1	40
4	21	(England) Liverpool F.C.	(Spain) Adrián Vallés	31	+ 9.769	12	36
5	16	(Portugal) F.C. Porto	(France) Tristan Gommendy	31	+ 10.029	13	32
6	18	(Spain) Sevilla FC	(France) Sébastien Bourdais	31	+ 19.731	17	29
7	15	(Spain) Atlético Madrid	(Spain) María de Villota	31	+ 22.433	2	26
8	10	(Switzerland) FC Basel 1893	(Germany) Max Wissel	31	+ 23.472	14	23
9	17	(Scotland) Rangers F.C.	(Australia) John Martin	31	+ 24.687	9	20
10	9	(Greece) Olympiacos CFP	(Argentina) Esteban Guerrieri	31	+ 28.994	11	18
11	69	(France) Olympique Lyonnais	(France) Nelson Panciatici	31	+ 1:06.568	10	16
12	7	(Brazil) CR Flamengo	(Brazil) Enrique Bernoldi	25	Tech. Problem	8	14
13	2	(Portugal) Sporting CP	(Portugal) Pedro Petiz	24		6	12
14	3	(Italy) A.C. Milan	(Italy) Giorgio Pantano	23	Spun Off	16	10
15	8	(Belgium) R.S.C. Anderlecht	(Netherlands) Yelmer Buurman	9	Acc. Damage	18	8
16	22	(Italy) A.S. Roma	(France) Julien Jousse	5	Spun Off	4	7
17	5	(Netherlands) PSV Eindhoven	(Netherlands) Carlo van Dam	0	Acc. Damage	7	6
18	14	(Brazil) SC Corinthians	(Brazil) Antônio Pizzonia	0	Acc. Damage	5	5
Fastest lap: Tristan Gommendy (F.C. Porto) 1:20.650 (106.78 mph)

=== Super Final ===
Pos	No	Team	Driver	Laps	Time/Retired	Grid
1	8	(Belgium) R.S.C. Anderlecht	(Netherlands) Yelmer Buurman	5	6:50.799	5
2	18	(Spain) Sevilla FC	(France) Sébastien Bourdais	5	+ 1.393	2
3	21	(England) Liverpool F.C.	(Spain) Adrián Vallés	5	+ 4.353	3
4	4	(Turkey) Galatasaray S.K.	(China) Ho-Pin Tung	5	+ 8.770	6
5	16	(Portugal) F.C. Porto	(France) Tristan Gommendy	5	+ 10.288	4
6	19	(England) Tottenham Hotspur	(United Kingdom) Craig Dolby	5	+ 18.199	1
Fastest lap: Yelmer Buurman (R.S.C Anderlecht) 1:21.476 (105.70 mph)
