= FC Basel 1893 (Superleague Formula team) =

FC Basel 1893 SF Racing Team
Founded	2008
Country	Switzerland
Driver(s)	Max Wissel ('08, '09, '10)
First race	2008 Donington
Last race	2010 Navarra
Rounds	24
Ch'ships	0
Total points	1180 (including Super Finals)
2010 position	3rd (667 pts)
Races / Poles / Wins / Podiums / F. Laps; 45 / 1 / 2 / 7 / 6
NOTE - Data not including Super Finals

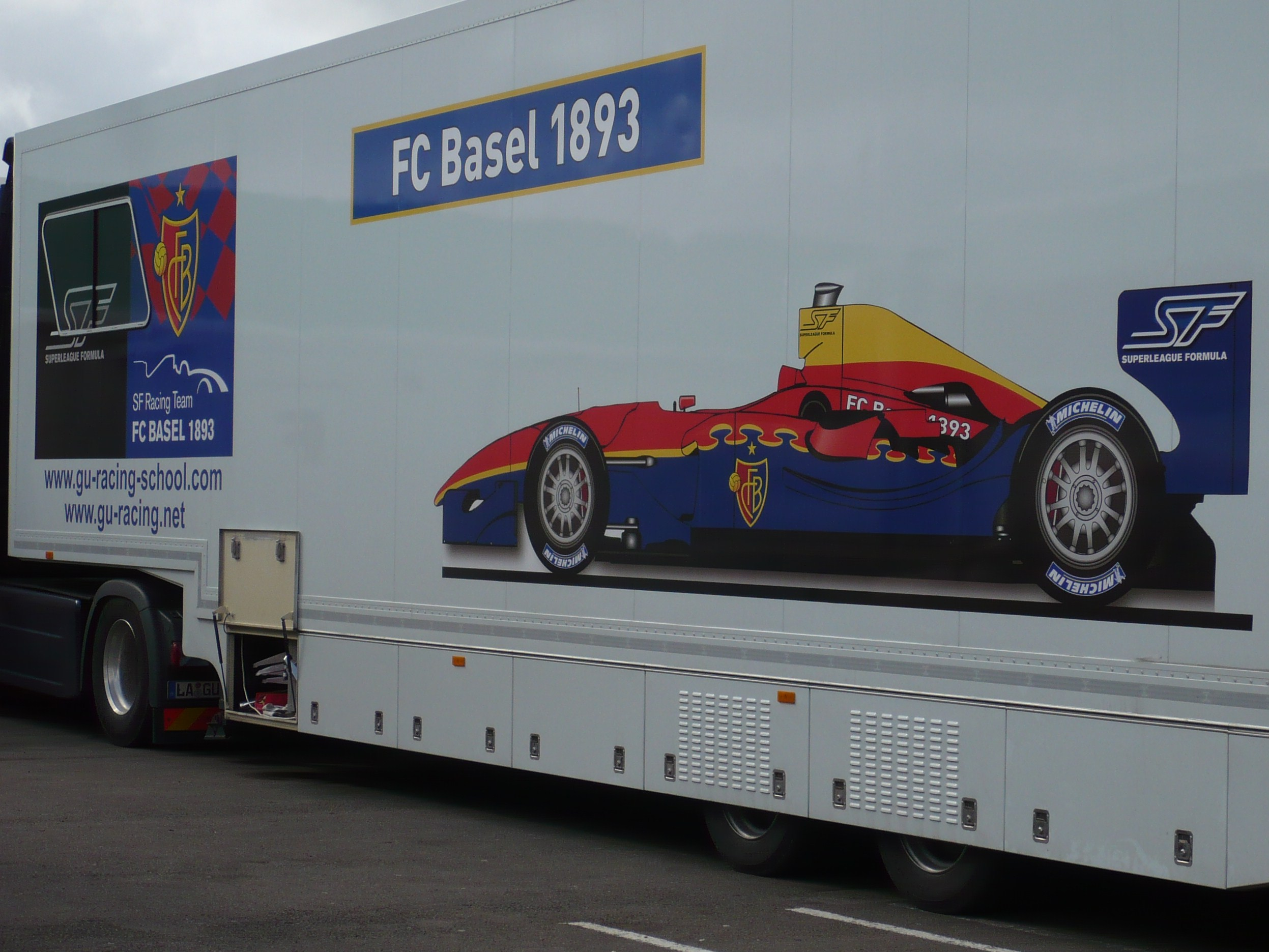
The FC Basel 1893 team truck in Silverstone Circuit's paddock (2010)

FC Basel 1893 Superleague Formula team was a motor racing team representing Switzerland's FC Basel in the Superleague Formula championship.

They finished 15th in the inaugural championship with young German driver Max Wissel. It returned in 2009 with Wissel behind the wheel once again, finishing 3rd in the standings. He finished 3rd again in 2010. The team did not return for the 2011 season.

== Record ==
(key)

=== 2008 ===
Operator(s)	Driver(s)	1		2		3		4		5		6		Points	Rank
Operator(s)	Driver(s)	DON		NÜR		ZOL		EST		VAL		JER		Points	Rank
GU-Racing International	(Germany) Max Wissel	9	7	9	13	4	5	18	14	12	15	11	17	205	15th

=== 2009 ===
- Super Final results in 2009 did not count for points towards the main championship.

Operator(s)	Driver(s)	1			2			3			4			5			6			Points	Rank
Operator(s)	Driver(s)	MAG			ZOL			DON			EST			MOZ			JAR			Points	Rank
GU-Racing International	(Germany) Max Wissel	10	3	5	4	8	–	1	3	3	DN	11	X	9	14	–	5	8	X	308	3rd

=== 2010 ===
Operator(s)	Driver(s)	1			2			3			4			5			6			7			8			9			10			NC			11			Points	Rank
Operator(s)	Driver(s)	SIL			ASS			MAG			JAR			NÜR			ZOL			BRH			ADR			POR			ORD			BEI			NAV			Points	Rank
GU-Racing International	(Germany) Max Wissel	5	6	2	3	13	5	17	1	3	4	7	4	8	5	4	7	4	6	6	11	X	4	7	2	7	4	4	2	2	6	DN	DN	C	6	14	X	667	3rd
