= 2008 Superleague Formula season =

Motorsport season

2008 Superleague Formula

Seasons
- ← none 2009 →

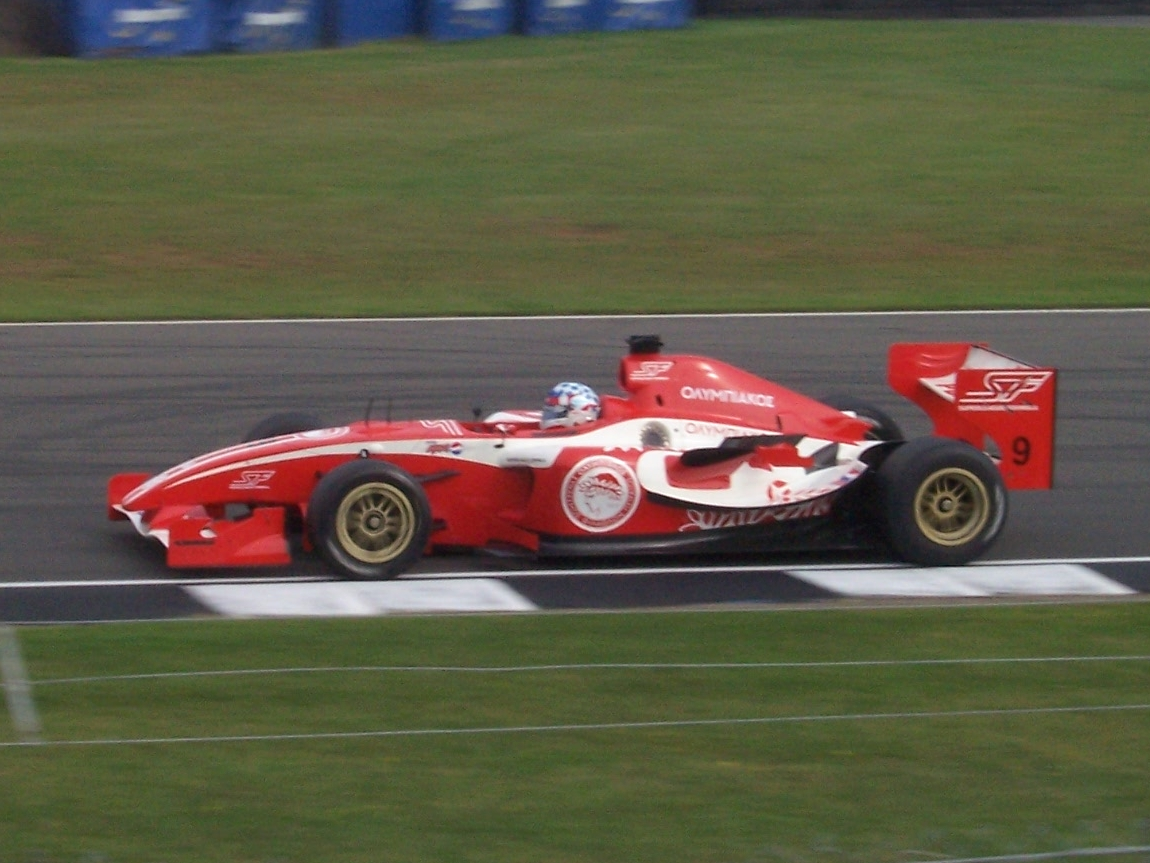
Olympiacos CFP (Kasper Andersen) at Superleague Formula Round 1

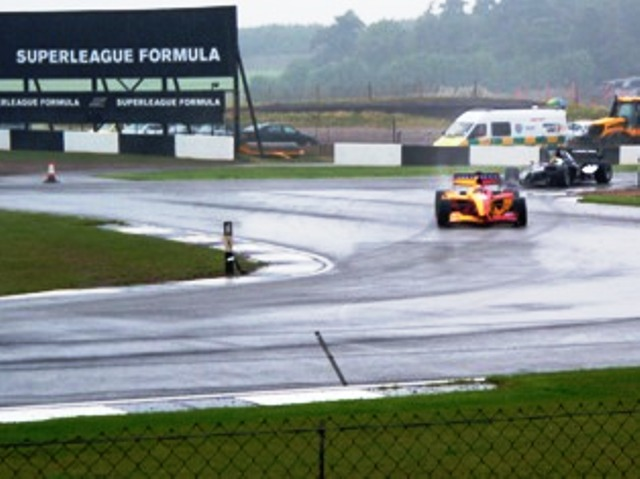
Galatasaray S.K. (Alessandro Pier Guidi) at Superleague Formula Round 1

The 2008 Superleague Formula season was the inaugural Superleague Formula championship. The season started very late in 2008 with the first round being on August 31 at Donington Park. There were six rounds (twelve races) in total with the successful season finale at Circuito Permanente de Jerez on 23 November. In the 18 cars on the grid were established A1GP and GP2 drivers as well as two ex-Formula One race starters, Robert Doornbos and Antônio Pizzonia.

Beijing Guoan, run under former Formula One team Zakspeed with driver Davide Rigon, were eventually crowned the first ever champions at the last event of the season.

== Teams and drivers ==
- All teams competed on Michelin tyres.

Entrant	Race team	No.	Race driver(s)	Rounds
(Italy) A.C. Milan	(Italy) Scuderia Playteam	3	(Netherlands) Robert Doornbos	All
(Turkey) Galatasaray S.K.	(Italy) Scuderia Playteam	4	(Italy) Alessandro Pier Guidi	All
(Netherlands) PSV Eindhoven	(Belgium) Azerti Motorsport	5	(Netherlands) Yelmer Buurman	All
(United Arab Emirates) Al Ain	(Belgium) Azerti Motorsport	6	(United Arab Emirates) Andreas Zuber	1–2
(United Arab Emirates) Al Ain	(Belgium) Azerti Motorsport	6	(Belgium) Bertrand Baguette	3, 6
(United Arab Emirates) Al Ain	(Belgium) Azerti Motorsport	6	(Netherlands) Paul Meijer	4
(United Arab Emirates) Al Ain	(Belgium) Azerti Motorsport	6	(Netherlands) Dominick Muermans	5
(Brazil) CR Flamengo	(Belgium) Team Astromega	7	(Brazil) Tuka Rocha	All
(Belgium) R.S.C. Anderlecht	(Belgium) Team Astromega	8	(United Kingdom) Craig Dolby	All
(Greece) Olympiacos CFP	(Germany) GU-Racing International	9	(Denmark) Kasper Andersen	1–4
(Greece) Olympiacos CFP	(Germany) GU-Racing International	9	(Greece) Stamatis Katsimis	5–6
(Switzerland) FC Basel 1893	(Germany) GU-Racing International	10	(Germany) Max Wissel	All
(Germany) Borussia Dortmund	(Germany) Zakspeed	11	(France) Nelson Philippe	1–2
(Germany) Borussia Dortmund	(Germany) Zakspeed	11	(Netherlands) Paul Meijer	3
(Germany) Borussia Dortmund	(Germany) Zakspeed	11	(Italy) Enrico Toccacelo	4–5
(Germany) Borussia Dortmund	(Germany) Zakspeed	11	(United Kingdom) James Walker	6
(China) Beijing Guoan	(Germany) Zakspeed	12	(Italy) Davide Rigon	All
(Brazil) SC Corinthians	(Italy) EuroInternational	14	(Spain) Andy Soucek	1
(Brazil) SC Corinthians	(Italy) EuroInternational	14	(Brazil) Antônio Pizzonia	2–6
(Spain) Atlético Madrid	(Italy) EuroInternational	15	(Spain) Andy Soucek	2–6
(Scotland) Rangers F.C.	(United Kingdom) Alan Docking Racing	17	(United Kingdom) Ryan Dalziel	1, 3–6
(Scotland) Rangers F.C.	(United Kingdom) Alan Docking Racing	17	(United Kingdom) James Walker	2
(Portugal) F.C. Porto	(United Kingdom) Alan Docking Racing	16	(France) Tristan Gommendy	1–4
(Portugal) F.C. Porto	(United Kingdom) Hitech Junior Team	16	(France) Tristan Gommendy	5–6
(England) Liverpool F.C.	(United Kingdom) Hitech Junior Team	21	(Spain) Adrián Vallés	All
(Spain) Sevilla FC	(Spain) GTA Motor Competición	18	(Spain) Borja García	All
(England) Tottenham Hotspur	(Spain) GTA Motor Competición	19	(United Kingdom) Duncan Tappy	1–3, 5–6
(England) Tottenham Hotspur	(Spain) GTA Motor Competición	19	(United Kingdom) Dominik Jackson	4
(Italy) A.S. Roma	(Italy) FMS International	22	(Italy) Enrico Toccacelo	1–3
(Italy) A.S. Roma	(Italy) FMS International	22	(France) Franck Perera	4–6
Sources:

- No numbers 1 or 2 because it was the first season.
- Cars 16 and 17 were run by Team West-Tec during pre-season.
- Atlético Madrid did not enter until prior to round 2.
- FC Porto switched from Alan Docking Racing to Hitech Racing prior round 5.

=== Test/reserve drivers ===
Driver	Driver
(Belgium) Jérôme d'Ambrosio	(France) Bruce Jouanny
(South Africa) Jimmy Auby	(United Kingdom) Robbie Kerr
(Hungary) Zsolt Baumgartner	(Italy) Paolo Maria Nocera
(Brazil) Enrique Bernoldi	(Italy) Giacomo Ricci
(United Kingdom) Dan Clarke	(Germany) Daniel la Rosa
(Italy) Giambattista Giannoccaro	(Turkey) Jason Tahincioglu
(Belgium) Jan Heylen	(Belgium) Nico Verdonck
(Germany) Jens Höing	(Germany) Andreas Wirth

== 2008 schedule ==
=== Race calendar and results ===
Round		Race	Date	Pole position	Fastest lap	Winning club	Winning team	Report
1	R1	(United Kingdom) Donington Park	August 31	(China) Beijing Guoan	(China) Beijing Guoan	(China) Beijing Guoan	(Germany) Zakspeed	Report
1	R2	(United Kingdom) Donington Park	August 31		(Netherlands) PSV Eindhoven	(Spain) Sevilla FC	(Spain) GTA Motor Competición	Report
2	R1	(Germany) Nürburgring	September 21	(Italy) A.C. Milan	(Netherlands) PSV Eindhoven	(Italy) A.C. Milan	(Italy) Scuderia Playteam	Report
2	R2	(Germany) Nürburgring	September 21		(Brazil) SC Corinthians	(Netherlands) PSV Eindhoven	(Belgium) Azerti Motorsport	Report
3	R1	(Belgium) Zolder	October 5	(Germany) Borussia Dortmund	(England) Liverpool F.C.	(England) Liverpool F.C.	(United Kingdom) Hitech Junior Team	Report
3	R2	(Belgium) Zolder	October 5		(Spain) Atlético Madrid	(China) Beijing Guoan	(Germany) Zakspeed	Report
4	R1	(Portugal) Estoril	October 19	(Italy) A.S. Roma	(Spain) Atlético Madrid	(England) Liverpool F.C.	(United Kingdom) Hitech Junior Team	Report
4	R2	(Portugal) Estoril	October 19		(Germany) Borussia Dortmund	(United Arab Emirates) Al Ain	(Belgium) Azerti Motorsport	Report
5	R1	(Italy) Vallelunga	November 2	(England) Liverpool F.C.	(China) Beijing Guoan	(China) Beijing Guoan	(Germany) Zakspeed	Report
5	R2	(Italy) Vallelunga	November 2		(Spain) Atlético Madrid	(Portugal) F.C. Porto	(United Kingdom) Hitech Junior Team	Report
6	R1	(Spain) Jerez	November 23	(England) Liverpool F.C.	(Belgium) R.S.C. Anderlecht	(Italy) A.C. Milan	(Italy) Scuderia Playteam	Report
6	R2	(Spain) Jerez	November 23		(China) Beijing Guoan	(Germany) Borussia Dortmund	(Germany) Zakspeed	Report
Sources:

- Race 2 starts with reverse grid from finishing order of Race 1.

=== Test calendar and results ===
- The first group test was at Vallelunga, Italy and ran from August 6–8. Scuderia Playteam were the fastest team on all three days with drivers Robert Doornbos and Alessandro Pier Guidi putting in the fast laps, for the clubs they would later go on to race for. Prior to the opening round, two test sessions at Donington Park, UK on August 21 and 28 further helped the cars and it was the combination of FMS International and Enrico Toccacelo for A.S. Roma who were fastest on both occasions.

== Championship standings ==
Pos	Entrant	Drivers	(United Kingdom) DON		(Germany) NÜR		(Belgium) ZOL		(Portugal) EST		(Italy) VAL		(Spain) JER		Pts
Pos	Entrant	Drivers	R1	R2	R1	R2	R1	R2	R1	R2	R1	R2	R1	R2	Pts
1	(China) Beijing Guoan	(Italy) Davide Rigon	**1**	6	5	3	17	1	5	5	1	5	9	3	413
2	(Netherlands) PSV Eindhoven	(Netherlands) Yelmer Buurman	4	8	10	1	7	3	9	8	10	3	8	9	337
3	(Italy) A.C. Milan	(Netherlands) Robert Doornbos	17	DN	**1**	6	18	**4**	2	2	2	17	1	10	335
4	(England) Liverpool F.C.	(Spain) Adrián Vallés	5	3	14	14	1	6	1	12	**9**	4	**7**	15	325
5	(Italy) A.S. Roma	(Italy) Enrico Toccacelo	2	10	17	**4**	13	7							307
5	(Italy) A.S. Roma	(France) Franck Perera							**3**	16	15	2	5	5	307
6	(Belgium) R.S.C. Anderlecht	(England) Craig Dolby	14	16	2	2	2	16	14	9	7	6	4	8	303
7	(Portugal) F.C. Porto	(France) Tristan Gommendy	7	9	8	5	6	15	16	DN	8	1	2	12	277
8	(Turkey) Galatasaray S.K.	(Italy) Alessandro Pier Guidi	13	13	3	7	14	12	7	3	3	11	18	**4**	277
9	(Brazil) SC Corinthians	(Spain) Andy Soucek	11	12											264
9	(Brazil) SC Corinthians	(Brazil) Antônio Pizzonia			7	10	10	18	4	4	6	16	12	2	264
10	(Spain) Sevilla FC	(Spain) Borja García	10	1	6	8	16	8	8	7	17	13	6	11	262
11	(England) Tottenham Hotspur	(England) Duncan Tappy	3	5	13	17	12	2			11	10	3	14	257
11	(England) Tottenham Hotspur	(England) Dominik Jackson							15	11					257
12	(United Arab Emirates) Al Ain	(United Arab Emirates) Andreas Zuber	6	15	11	11									244
12	(United Arab Emirates) Al Ain	(Belgium) Bertrand Baguette					11	10					10	7	244
12	(United Arab Emirates) Al Ain	(Netherlands) Paul Meijer							12	1					244
12	(United Arab Emirates) Al Ain	(Netherlands) Dominick Muermans									14	8			244
13	(Scotland) Rangers F.C.	(Scotland) Ryan Dalziel	8	14			8	17	13	15	5	7	15	6	227
13	(Scotland) Rangers F.C.	(England) James Walker			4	12									227
14	(Germany) Borussia Dortmund	(France) Nelson Philippe	15	4	15	DN									218
14	(Germany) Borussia Dortmund	(Netherlands) Paul Meijer					**3**	11							218
14	(Germany) Borussia Dortmund	(Italy) Enrico Toccacelo							17	6	18	**14**			218
14	(Germany) Borussia Dortmund	(England) James Walker											14	1	218
15	(Switzerland) FC Basel 1893	(Germany) Max Wissel	9	7	9	13	4	5	18	**14**	12	15	11	17	205
16	(Brazil) CR Flamengo	(Brazil) Tuka Rocha	16	**2**	16	16	9	14	11	10	4	18	17	13	189
17	(Greece) Olympiacos CFP	(Denmark) Kasper Andersen	12	11	12	15	15	9	10	13					161
17	(Greece) Olympiacos CFP	(Greece) Stamatis Katsimis									13	9	13	16	161
18	(Spain) Atlético Madrid	(Spain) Andy Soucek			DN	9	5	13	6	17	16	12	16	18	132
Pos	Entrant	Drivers	R1	R2	R1	R2	R1	R2	R1	R2	R1	R2	R1	R2	Pts
Pos	Entrant	Drivers	(United Kingdom) DON		(Germany) NÜR		(Belgium) ZOL		(Portugal) EST		(Italy) VAL		(Spain) JER		Pts

Colour	Result
Gold	Winner
Silver	2nd place
Bronze	3rd place
Green	Finished
Purple	Did not finish
Red	Did not qualify (X)
Black	Disqualified (DQ)
White	Did not start (DN)
White	Race cancelled (C)
Blank	Excluded (EX)
Blank	Withdrew (WD)
**Bold**	Pole position
Italics	Fastest lap

NOTE – R2 starts
with reverse grid

Position	1st	2nd	3rd	4th	5th	6th	7th	8th	9th	10th	11th	12th	13th	14th	15th	16th	17th	18th	19th	20th	21st	22nd	DNS	Ref
Points	50	45	40	36	32	29	26	23	20	18	16	14	12	10	8	7	6	5	4	3	2	1	0	
