= 2010 Silverstone Superleague Formula round =

2010 Silverstone Superleague Formula round Superleague Formula round UK
- Circuit Map
- Date: 4 April, 2010
- Location: (United Kingdom) Silverstone Circuit, Northamptonshire, England
- Course: Permanent racing facility 3.194 mi (5.140 km)
- Laps: 25 & 25
Pole position
Team	(Switzerland) FC Basel 1893	Max Wissel
- Time: 1:43.282
Podium (1st race)
First	(England) Tottenham Hotspur	Craig Dolby
Second	(Italy) A.C. Milan	Yelmer Buurman
Third	(Brazil) CR Flamengo	Duncan Tappy
Fastest lap (1st race)
Team	(Portugal) F.C. Porto	Álvaro Parente
- Time: 1:33.982 (on lap 15)
Podium (2nd race)
First	(France) Olympique Lyonnais	Sébastien Bourdais
Second	(Greece) Olympiacos CFP	Chris van der Drift
Third	(Spain) Atlético Madrid	John Martin
Fastest lap (2nd race)
Team	(France) Olympique Lyonnais	Sébastien Bourdais
- Time: 1:32.818 (on lap 20)

The 2010 Silverstone Superleague Formula round was a Superleague Formula round, held on 4 April 2010 at the Silverstone Circuit, Northamptonshire, England. It was the first ever round at the Silverstone Circuit and the opening round of the 2010 Superleague Formula season.

It was the first Superleague Formula round in the United Kingdom which is not hosted at Donington Park. Donington Park hosted 2008 and 2009 events. Brands Hatch will also host a round of the Superleague Formula series later in the season.

British teams competing have been confirmed with the participation of reigning champions Liverpool F.C. and runners up Tottenham Hotspur. FC Midtjylland and Rangers F.C. did not continue in the series in 2010, but new team GD Bordeaux were ready in time to make their debut at this event.

Support races included the Dutch Supercar Challenge, the SPEED Series and the World Sportscar and Grand Prix Masters.

== Report ==
=== Practice and qualifying ===
Three practice sessions were held before the race; all were held on Friday and all were 30 minutes in duration. Tottenham Hotspur (Craig Dolby) finished on top of the rain affected session one with a time of 1:46.585. Session two had much better weather, with A.S. Roma (Julien Jousse) leading the timesheets with a 1:36.819. Session three was a rainout with no times being recorded. SC Corinthians (Robert Doornbos) and A.S. Roma (Julien Jousse) were some of the drivers to test the conditions, but both teams ended up in the gravel. Session three was ultimately red flagged.

The qualifying session was firstly split into two groups after practice on Friday; Group A and Group B. Teams compete against each other teams in their own groups, with the top four in each group advancing to the 'knock out stages'.

In Group A's 15 minute qualifying session on Saturday, F.C. Porto (Álvaro Parente) finished first with a time of 1:34.520. Also advancing were the two 'home teams' of Tottenham Hotspur and Liverpool F.C. and Swiss team FC Basel.

In Group Bs 15 minute qualifying session, Olympique Lyonnais (Sébastien Bourdais) finished first with a time of 1:34.432. Also advancing were Sevilla FC, CR Flamengo and A.C. Milan. Towards the end of Group B running, the rain started to come down again. This affected times at the end of the session with multiple cars going off the track. R.S.C. Anderlecht (Davide Rigon) ended their qualifying session in the gravel trap, complaining of new accelerator problems.

== Results ==
=== Qualifying ===
- In each group, the top four qualify for the quarter-finals.

==== Group A ====
Pos.	Team	Driver	Time
1	(Portugal) F.C. Porto	(Portugal) Álvaro Parente	1:34.520
2	(England) Tottenham Hotspur	(United Kingdom) Craig Dolby	1:34.885
3	(England) Liverpool F.C.	(United Kingdom) James Walker	1:34.919
4	(Switzerland) FC Basel 1893	(Germany) Max Wissel	1:35.309
5	(Greece) Olympiacos CFP	(New Zealand) Chris van der Drift	1:35.491
6	(Netherlands) PSV Eindhoven	(India) Narain Karthikeyan	1:35.584
7	(Spain) Atlético Madrid	(Australia) John Martin	1:35.632
8	(Italy) A.S. Roma	(France) Julien Jousse	1:35.654
9	(Brazil) SC Corinthians	(Netherlands) Robert Doornbos	1:36.034

==== Group B ====
Pos.	Team	Driver	Time
1	(France) Olympique Lyonnais	(France) Sébastien Bourdais	1:34.432
2	(Spain) Sevilla FC	(Spain) Marcos Martínez	1:34.666
3	(Brazil) CR Flamengo	(United Kingdom) Duncan Tappy	1:35.020
4	(Italy) A.C. Milan	(Netherlands) Yelmer Buurman	1:35.203
5	(Turkey) Galatasaray S.K.	(France) Tristan Gommendy	1:35.543
6	(Portugal) Sporting CP	(Spain) Borja García	1:35.576
7	(France) GD Bordeaux	(France) Franck Montagny	1:35.600
8	(Belgium) R.S.C. Anderlecht	(Italy) Davide Rigon	1:36.126

==== Knockout stages ====
Quarter-Finals			Semi-Finals			Pole Shoot Out
A1	F.C. Porto	1:47.052
B4	A.C. Milan	1:48.094	A1	F.C. Porto	1:44.691
A3	Liverpool F.C.	1:49.517	A3	Liverpool F.C.	1:45.519
B2	Sevilla FC	1:50.412				A1	F.C. Porto	1:43.701
A2	Tottenham Hotspur	1:46.499				A4	FC Basel 1893	1:43.282
B3	CR Flamengo	1:48.499	A2	Tottenham Hotspur	1:45.590
A4	FC Basel 1893	1:47.999	A4	FC Basel 1893	1:45.202
B1	Olympique Lyonnais	1:48.705

==== Grid ====
Pos.	Team	Driver	Time
1	(Switzerland) FC Basel 1893	(Germany) Max Wissel	1:43.282
2	(Portugal) F.C. Porto	(Portugal) Álvaro Parente	1:43.701
3	(England) Liverpool F.C.	(United Kingdom) James Walker	1:45.519
4	(England) Tottenham Hotspur	(United Kingdom) Craig Dolby	1:45.590
5	(Brazil) CR Flamengo	(United Kingdom) Duncan Tappy	1:48.499
6	(Spain) Sevilla FC	(Spain) Marcos Martínez	1:50.412
7	(Italy) A.C. Milan	(Netherlands) Yelmer Buurman	1:48.094
8	(France) Olympique Lyonnais	(France) Sébastien Bourdais	1:48.705
9	(Greece) Olympiacos CFP	(New Zealand) Chris van der Drift	1:35.491
10	(Turkey) Galatasaray S.K.	(France) Tristan Gommendy	1:35.543
11	(Netherlands) PSV Eindhoven	(India) Narain Karthikeyan	1:35.584
12	(Portugal) Sporting CP	(Spain) Borja García	1:35.576
13	(Spain) Atlético Madrid	(Australia) John Martin	1:35.632
14	(France) GD Bordeaux	(France) Franck Montagny	1:35.600
15	(Italy) A.S. Roma	(France) Julien Jousse	1:35.654
16	(Belgium) R.S.C. Anderlecht	(Italy) Davide Rigon	1:36.126
17	(Brazil) SC Corinthians	(Netherlands) Robert Doornbos	1:36.034

=== Race 1 ===
Pos	No	Team	Driver	Laps	Time/Retired	Grid	Pts.
1	19	(England) Tottenham Hotspur	(United Kingdom) Craig Dolby	25	40:51.242	4	50
2	3	(Italy) A.C. Milan	(Netherlands) Yelmer Buurman	25	+ 11.298	7	45
3	7	(Brazil) CR Flamengo	(United Kingdom) Duncan Tappy	25	+ 22.338	5	40
4	16	(Portugal) F.C. Porto	(Portugal) Álvaro Parente	25	+ 22.546	2	36
5	10	(Switzerland) FC Basel 1893	(Germany) Max Wissel	25	+ 35.498	1	32
6	18	(Spain) Sevilla FC	(Spain) Marcos Martínez	25	+ 36.527	6	29
7	2	(Portugal) Sporting CP	(Spain) Borja García	25	+ 37.114	12	26
8	22	(Italy) A.S. Roma	(France) Julien Jousse	25	+ 41.749	15	23
9	8	(Belgium) R.S.C. Anderlecht	(Italy) Davide Rigon	25	+ 52.806	16	20
10	15	(Spain) Atlético Madrid	(Australia) John Martin	25	+ 58.370	13	18
11	14	(Brazil) SC Corinthians	(Netherlands) Robert Doornbos	25	+ 1:08.507	17	16
12	5	(Netherlands) PSV Eindhoven	(India) Narain Karthikeyan	25	+ 1:09.734	11	14
13	9	(Greece) Olympiacos CFP	(New Zealand) Chris van der Drift	25	+ 1:17.600	9	12
14	4	(Turkey) Galatasaray S.K.	(France) Tristan Gommendy	24	+ 1 lap	10	10
15	69	(France) Olympique Lyonnais	(France) Sébastien Bourdais	24	+ 1 lap	8	8
16	1	(England) Liverpool F.C.	(United Kingdom) James Walker	3	Stalled	3	0
DNS	33	(France) GD Bordeaux	(France) Franck Montagny	0		14	0
Fastest lap: Álvaro Parente (F.C. Porto) 1:33.982 (122.36 mph)

=== Race 2 ===
Pos	No	Team	Driver	Laps	Time/Retired	Grid	Pts.
1	69	(France) Olympique Lyonnais	(France) Sébastien Bourdais	25	40:27.836	2	50
2	9	(Greece) Olympiacos CFP	(New Zealand) Chris van der Drift	25	+ 10.872	4	45
3	15	(Spain) Atlético Madrid	(Australia) John Martin	25	+ 14.402	7	40
4	19	(England) Tottenham Hotspur	(United Kingdom) Craig Dolby	25	+ 15.103	16	36
5	16	(Portugal) F.C. Porto	(Portugal) Álvaro Parente	25	+ 16.604	13	32
6	10	(Switzerland) FC Basel 1893	(Germany) Max Wissel	25	+ 17.241	12	29
7	14	(Brazil) SC Corinthians	(Netherlands) Robert Doornbos	25	+ 21.113	6	26
8	33	(France) GD Bordeaux	(France) Franck Montagny	25	+ 22.081	17	23
9	18	(Spain) Sevilla FC	(Spain) Marcos Martínez	25	+ 32.380	11	20
10	8	(Belgium) R.S.C. Anderlecht	(Italy) Davide Rigon	25	+ 33.065	8	18
11	2	(Portugal) Sporting CP	(Spain) Borja García	25	+ 33.611	10	16
12	7	(Brazil) CR Flamengo	(United Kingdom) Duncan Tappy	25	+ 36.582	14	14
13	22	(Italy) A.S. Roma	(France) Julien Jousse	25	+ 38.211	9	12
14	4	(Turkey) Galatasaray S.K.	(France) Tristan Gommendy	25	+ 1:14.894	3	10
15	5	(Netherlands) PSV Eindhoven	(India) Narain Karthikeyan	23	Spun Off	5	8
16	3	(Italy) A.C. Milan	(Netherlands) Yelmer Buurman	23	Retired	15	7
17	1	(England) Liverpool F.C.	(United Kingdom) James Walker	13	Retired	1	0
Fastest lap: Sébastien Bourdais (Olympique Lyonnais) 1:32.818 (123.89 mph)

=== Super Final ===
Pos	No	Team	Driver	Laps	Time/Retired	Grid	Pts.
1	19	(England) Tottenham Hotspur	(United Kingdom) Craig Dolby	5	7:55.043	1	6
2	10	(Switzerland) FC Basel 1893	(Germany) Max Wissel	5	+ 1.774	3	5
3	9	(Greece) Olympiacos CFP	(New Zealand) Chris van der Drift	5	+ 2.675	6	4
4	69	(France) Olympique Lyonnais	(France) Sébastien Bourdais	5	+ 3.311	5	3
5	16	(Portugal) F.C. Porto	(Portugal) Álvaro Parente	5	+ 4.032	2	2
6	15	(Spain) Atlético Madrid	(Australia) John Martin	5	+ 5.857	4	1
Fastest lap: Álvaro Parente (F.C. Porto) 1:34.451 (121.75 mph)

== Standings after the round ==
Pos	Team	Points
1	(England) Tottenham Hotspur	92
2	(Portugal) F.C. Porto	70
3	(Switzerland) FC Basel 1893	66
4	(France) Olympique Lyonnais	61
5	(Greece) Olympiacos CFP	61
