= Tottenham Hotspur (Superleague Formula team) =

Tottenham Hotspur SF Racing Team
Founded	2008
Country	England
Driver(s)	Duncan Tappy (2008); Dominik Jackson (2008); Craig Dolby ('09, '10)
First race	2008 Donington
Last race	2010 Navarra
Rounds	24
Ch'ships	0
Total points	1336 (including Super Finals)
2010 position	2nd (697 pts)
Races / Poles / Wins / Podiums / F. Laps; 48 / 1 / 3 / 15 / 4
NOTE - Data not including Super Finals

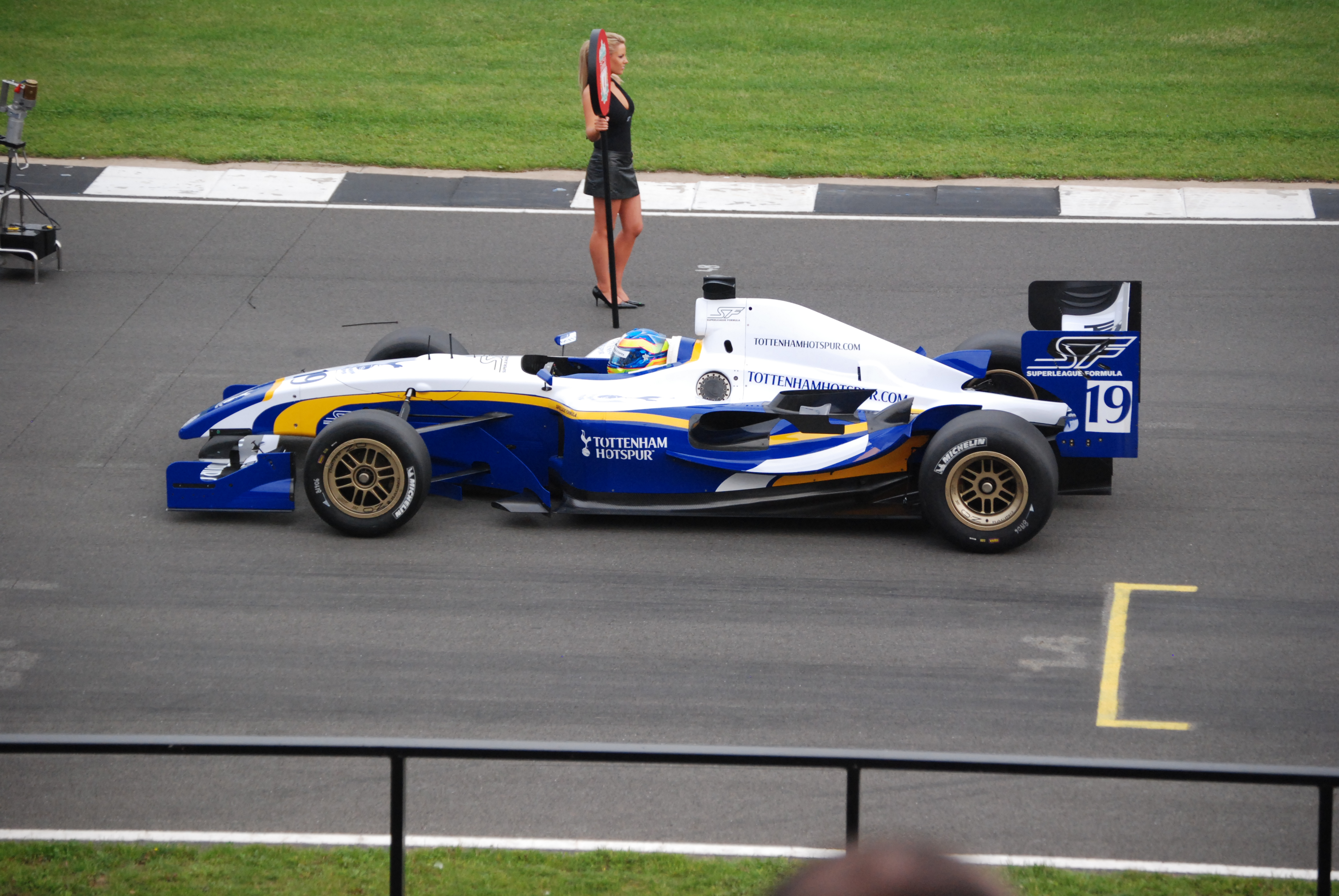
Duncan Tappy on the grid during the 2008 Donington weekend.

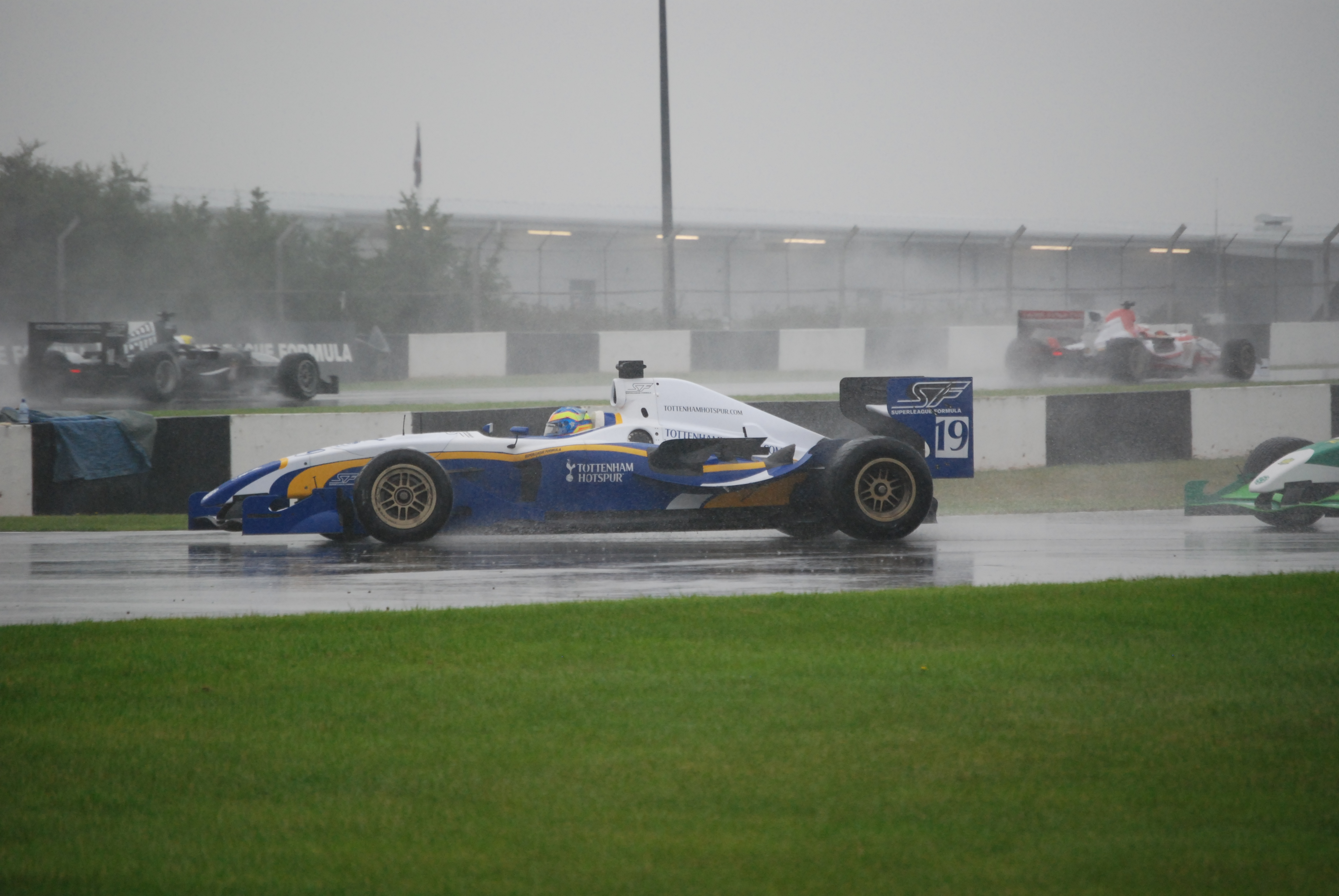
The Tottenham Hotspur car with Duncan Tappy during Donington Park's 2008 round

Tottenham Hotspur Superleague Formula team was the racing team of Tottenham Hotspur, a football team that competes in England in the Premier League. The Tottenham Hotspur racing team competed in the Superleague Formula for only three seasons. It was operated in 2008 first by GTA Motor Competición and for the other two seasons was operated by Alan Docking Racing.

Tottenham did not continue the sponsorship after the end of the 2010 season and, with the format changing to national teams, Dolby then raced for the English team in the 2011 series. However, just after two races in 2011, the Superleague folded.

== 2008 season ==
In the 2008 Superleague Formula season, Tottenham finished eleventh overall in the standings. The Tottenham driver was Duncan Tappy in all rounds except the 2008 Estoril Superleague Formula round, where Dominik Jackson was driving. The team's best placing was second in the second race of the 2008 Zolder Superleague Formula round.

== 2009 season ==
For the 2009 Superleague Formula season, Craig Dolby was confirmed as the driver and Alan Docking Racing would now operate the team. Dolby drove for the Anderlecht team the previous year.

At the Donington Park course, Dolby finished the grid in sixth place. In the first race, Dolby finished fifth place and, in the second race, in fourth place.

== 2010 season ==
The 2010 season started off at Silverstone and, in the first race of 25 laps, Craig Dolby took first position on the podium. After two races, Tottenham had a lead of 48 out of 50 points. By the end of the season, Dolby finished as runner-up and had been reported to have earned €1.8 million.

== Record ==
(key)

=== 2008 ===
Operator(s)	Driver(s)	1		2		3		4		5		6		Points	Rank
Operator(s)	Driver(s)	DON		NÜR		ZOL		EST		VAL		JER		Points	Rank
GTA Motor Competición	(United Kingdom) Duncan Tappy	3	5	13	17	12	2			11	10	3	14	257	11th
GTA Motor Competición	(United Kingdom) Dominik Jackson							15	11					257	11th

=== 2009 ===
- Super Final results in 2009 did not count for points towards the main championship.

Operator(s)	Driver(s)	1			2			3			4			5			6			Points	Rank
Operator(s)	Driver(s)	MAG			ZOL			DON			EST			MOZ			JAR			Points	Rank
Alan Docking Racing	(United Kingdom) Craig Dolby	3	10	DN	1	9	–	5	4	2	8	18	X	5	2	–	4	2	6	382	2nd

=== 2010 ===
Operator(s)	Driver(s)	1			2			3			4			5			6			7			8			9			10			NC			11			Points	Rank
Operator(s)	Driver(s)	SIL			ASS			MAG			JAR			NÜR			ZOL			BRH			ADR			POR			ORD			BEI			NAV			Points	Rank
Alan Docking Racing	(United Kingdom) Craig Dolby	1	4	1	7	2	2	2	4	6	5	3	6	10	6	X	5	17	X	2	13	5	13	2	X	5	13	X	4	10	X	1	8	C	3	4	2	697	2nd
