= Craig Dolby =

British racing driver

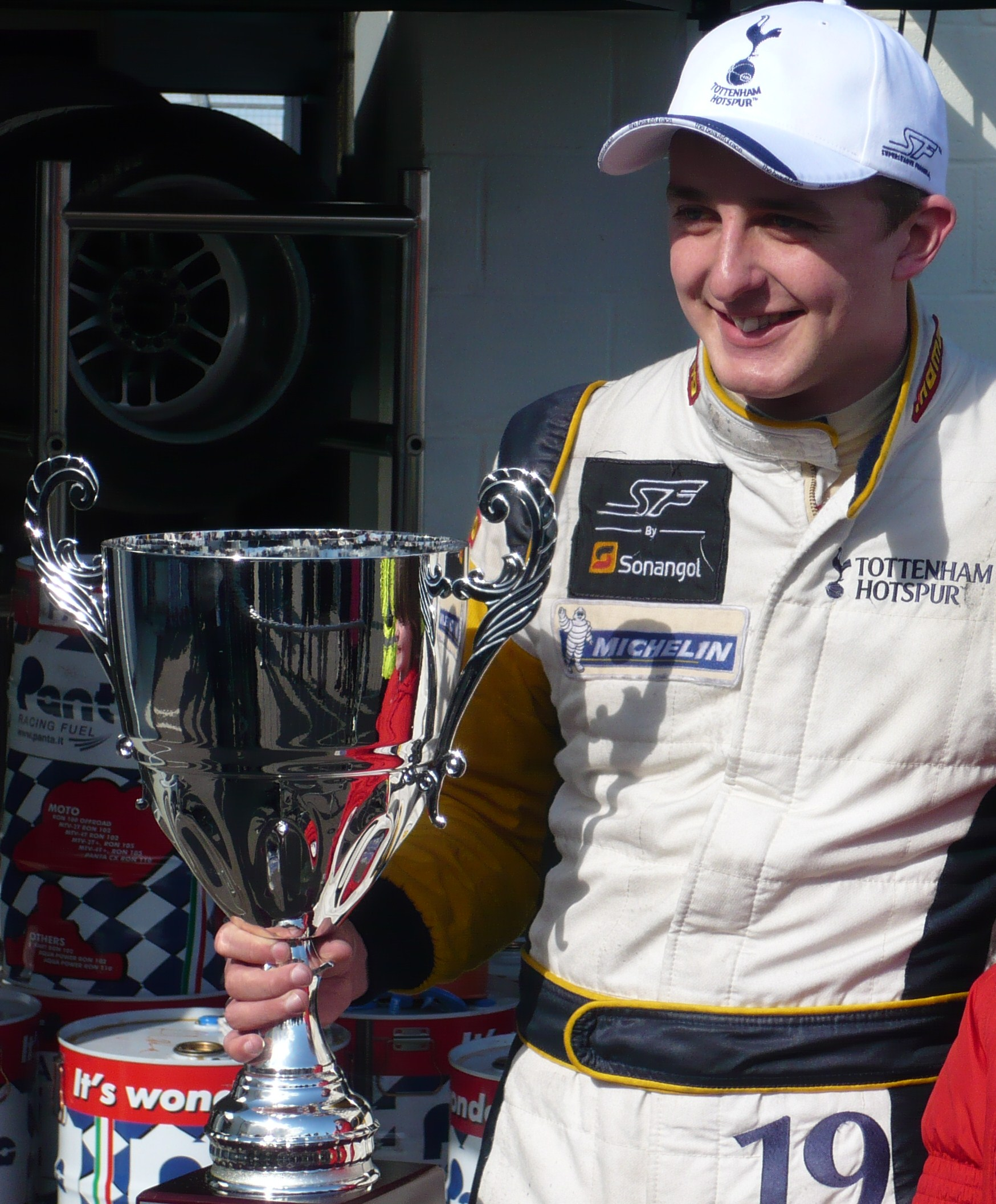
- Nationality: (United Kingdom) British
- Born: Craig Russ Dolby; 31 March 1988 (age 38) Melton Mowbray, Leicestershire (United Kingdom)

Superleague Formula career
- Debut season: 2008
- Categorisation: FIA Gold
- Car number: 19
- Former teams: R.S.C. Anderlecht; Tottenham Hotspur
- Starts: 14
- Wins: 0
- Poles: 0
- Fastest laps: 2
- Best finish: 6th in 2008

Previous series
- 2007 2007 2004 2004 2003, 2006: Formula Renault 2.0 France; Formula Renault 2.0 Italia; Formula Renault 2.0 UK Winter Series; Formula Renault 2.0 UK; Formula Renault 1.6 Belgium

Championship titles
- 2006: Formula Renault 1.6 Belgium

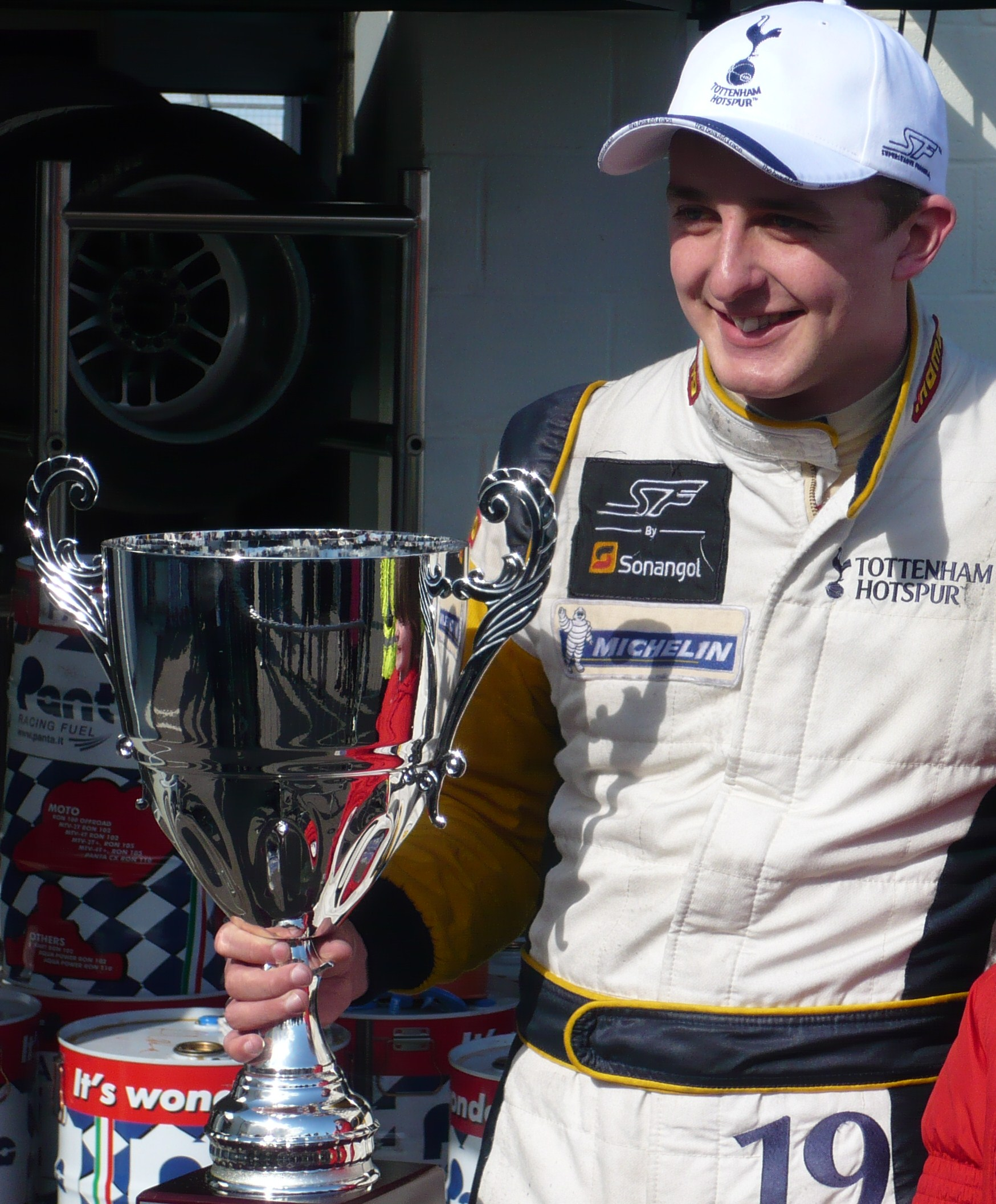
Dolby holding a trophy from one of his race wins at the 2010 Silverstone Superleague Formula round

Craig Russ Dolby (born 31 March 1988 in Melton Mowbray, Leicestershire, England) is a British racing driver and stunt driver. He has raced in Formula Renault series around the world for most of his career, winning the Formula Renault 1.6 Belgium championship in 2006. Since 2008, Dolby has raced in the Superleague Formula and has raced for R.S.C. Anderlecht in the 2008 season and Tottenham Hotspur in the 2009 season.

Dolby has also worked as a stunt driver on movie sets on major film productions. He had the opportunity to pursue that career through a contact he met in the Superleague paddock. He featured in F1 (2025), starring Brad Pitt.

== Racing record ==
=== Career summary ===
Season	Series	Team	No.	Races	Poles	Wins	Points	Position
2003	Formula Renault 1.6 Belgium	Paston Racing		12	1	4	?	4th
2004	Formula Renault 2.0 UK	Paston Racing		20	0	0	87	18th
2004	Formula Renault 2.0 UK Winter Series	Team JLR		4	0	0	31	13th
2006	Formula Renault 1.6 Belgium	Team Astromega		12	4	7	204	**1st**
2007	France Formula Renault 2.0	Epsilon Sport		13	0	0	28	11th
2007	Formula Renault 2.0 Italy	ITLOOX Racing		2	0	0	0	NC
2008	Superleague Formula	R.S.C. Anderlecht	8	12	0	0	303	6th
2009	Superleague Formula	Tottenham Hotspur	19	14	0	1	382	**2nd**
2010	Superleague Formula	Tottenham Hotspur		3	1	2	92	**2nd**

=== Superleague Formula ===
==== 2008-2009 ====
(Races in bold indicate pole position) (Races in italics indicate fastest lap)

Year	Team	Operator	1		2		3		4		5		6		Position	Points
2008	R.S.C. Anderlecht	Team Astromega	DON		NÜR		ZOL		EST		VAL		JER		6th	303
2008	R.S.C. Anderlecht	Team Astromega	14	16	2	2	2	16	14	9	7	6	4	8	6th	303
2009	Tottenham Hotspur	Alan Docking Racing	MAG		ZOL		DON		EST		MOZ		JAR		**2nd**	**382**
2009	Tottenham Hotspur	Alan Docking Racing	3	10	1	9	5	4	8	18	5	2	4	2	**2nd**	**382**

==== 2009 Super Final results ====
- Super Final results in 2009 did not count for points towards the main championship.

Year	Team	1	2	3	4	5	6
2009	Tottenham Hotspur Alan Docking Racing	MAG; DNS	ZOL; N/A	DON; 2	EST; DNQ	MOZ; N/A	JAR; 6

==== 2010 ====
Year	Team	Operator	1			2			3			4			5			6			7			8			9			10			11			12			Position	Points
2010	Tottenham Hotspur	Alan Docking Racing	SIL			ASS			MAG			JAR			NÜR			ZOL			BRH			ADR			POR			ORD			BEI †			NAV			**2nd**	**697**
2010	Tottenham Hotspur	Alan Docking Racing	1	4	**1**	7	2	**2**	**2**	4	**6**	5	3	**6**	10	6	X	5	17	X	2	13	5	13	2	X	5	13	X	4	10	X	1	8	C	3	4	2	**2nd**	**697**
2011	England	Alan Docking Racing	HOL			BEL																																	6th	124
2011	England	Alan Docking Racing	2	8	1	**1**	13	X																															6th	124

† Non-championship event.

=== Complete FIA World Endurance Championship results ===
Year	Entrant	Class	Car	Engine	1	2	3	4	5	6	7	8	Rank	Points
2013	Delta-ADR	LMP2	Oreca 03	Nissan VK45DE 4.5 L V8	SIL	SPA	LMS	SÃO	COA	FUJ	SHA; 4	BHR; 6	17th	20

=== Complete Stock Car Brasil results ===
Year	Team	Car	1	2	3	4	5	6	7	8	9	10	11	12	13	14	15	16	17	18	19	20	21	Rank	Points
2014	RZ Motorsport	Chevrolet Sonic	INT; 1; 8	SCZ; 1	SCZ; 2	BRA; 1	BRA; 2	GOI; 1	GOI; 2	GOI; 1	CAS; 1	CAS; 2	CUR; 1	CUR; 2	VEL; 1	VEL; 2	SCZ; 1	SCZ; 2	TAR; 1	TAR; 2	SAL; 1	SAL; 2	CUR; 1	NC†	0†

† Ineligible for championship points.

=== Complete Formula Acceleration 1 results ===
(key) (Races in bold indicate pole position) (Races in italics indicate fastest lap)

Year	Team	1	2	3	4	5	6	7	8	9	10	Pos	Points
2014	Sweden	ALG; 1	ALG; 2	NAV; 1	NAV; 2	NÜR; 1	NÜR; 2	MNZ; 1	MNZ; 2	ASS; 1; 14	ASS; 2; 4	15th	12

=== Complete Blancpain Sprint Series results ===
Year	Team	Car	Class	1	2	3	4	5	6	7	8	9	10	11	12	13	14	Pos.	Points
2015	MRS GT-Racing	Nissan GT-R Nismo GT3	Pro	NOG; QR; Ret	NOG; CR; 15	BRH; QR; 3	BRH; CR; 6	ZOL; QR; 6	ZOL; CR; 9	MOS; QR; 12	MOS; CR; 11							15th	31
2015	Always Evolving Motorsport	Nissan GT-R Nismo GT3	Pro									ALG; QR; 14	ALG; CR; 8	MIS; QR; 9	MIS; CR; 5	ZAN; QR; 6	ZAN; CR; Ret	15th	31
2016	Garage 59	McLaren 650S GT3	Pro	MIS; QR; Ret	MIS; CR; 26	BRH; QR	BRH; CR	NÜR; QR	NÜR; CR	HUN; QR	HUN; CR	CAT; QR	CAT; CR					NC	0
