= List of Superleague Formula football clubs =

This is a list of Superleague Formula football clubs. Twenty-three cars sporting liveries of famous football clubs mainly from Europe but also from Asia and South America have started at least one race in Superleague Formula. A further eight cars with liveries in the colours of nations have also competed. This list is accurate up to and including the final round of the 2010 championship at Navarra.

== Football clubs' summary ==
No.	Football Club	Continent	Associated Football Club	Seasons	Racing Drivers
2	(Portugal) Sporting CP	Europe	Sporting Clube de Portugal	2009; 2010	Pedro Petiz; Borja García, Andy Soucek, Máximo Cortés, Adrián Vallés
3	(Italy) A.C. Milan	Europe	A.C. Milan	2008; 2009; 2010	Robert Doornbos; Giorgio Pantano; Yelmer Buurman
4 10 (in 2011)	(Turkey) Galatasaray S.K.	Europe	Galatasaray S.K.	2008; 2009; 2010; 2011	Alessandro Pier Guidi; Duncan Tappy, Scott Mansell, Ho-Pin Tung; Tristan Gommendy, Andy Soucek, Giacomo Ricci, Chris van der Drift; Andy Soucek
4	(Czech Republic) AC Sparta Prague	Europe	AC Sparta Prague	2011	Filip Salaquarda
5 2 (in 2011)	(Netherlands) PSV Eindhoven	Europe	PSV Eindhoven	2008; 2009; 2010; 2011	Yelmer Buurman; Dominick Muermans, Carlo van Dam; Narain Karthikeyan, Hywel Lloyd, Adderly Fong, Earl Bamber, Esteban Guerrieri; Yelmer Buurman
5	Team Luxembourg	Europe	none	2011	Frédéric Vervisch
6	(United Arab Emirates) Al Ain	Asia	Al Ain Club	2008; 2009	Andreas Zuber, Bertrand Baguette, Paul Meijer, Dominick Muermans; Miguel Molina, Esteban Guerrieri
6	Team New Zealand	Oceania	none	2011	Earl Bamber
7	(Brazil) CR Flamengo	S America	Clube de Regatas do Flamengo	2008; 2009; 2010	Tuka Rocha; Enrique Bernoldi, Jonathan Kennard; Duncan Tappy, Franck Perera, Andy Soucek
7	Team Japan	Asia	none	2011	Duncan Tappy
8 1 (in 2011)	(Belgium) R.S.C. Anderlecht	Europe	R.S.C. Anderlecht	2008; 2009; 2010; 2011	Craig Dolby; Yelmer Buurman; Davide Rigon; Neel Jani
8	Team Netherlands	Europe	none	2011	Robert Doornbos
9	(Greece) Olympiacos CFP	Europe	Olympiacos F.C.	2008; 2009; 2010	Kasper Andersen, Stamatis Katsimis; Davide Rigon, Esteban Guerrieri; Chris van der Drift, Ben Hanley, Neel Jani
10	(Switzerland) FC Basel 1893	Europe	FC Basel	2008; 2009; 2010	Max Wissel; Max Wissel; Max Wissel
11	(Germany) Borussia Dortmund	Europe	Borussia Dortmund	2008	Nelson Philippe, Paul Meijer, Enrico Toccacelo, James Walker
12 24 (in 2010)	(China) Beijing Guoan	Asia	Beijing Guoan F.C.	2008; 2010	Davide Rigon; John Martin
14	(Brazil) SC Corinthians	S America	Sport Club Corinthians Paulista	2008; 2009; 2010	Andy Soucek, Antônio Pizzonia; Antônio Pizzonia; Robert Doornbos
14	Team Brazil	S America	none	2011	Antônio Pizzonia
15 9 (in 2011)	(Spain) Atlético Madrid	Europe	Atlético Madrid	2008; 2009; 2010; 2011	Andy Soucek; Ho-Pin Tung, María de Villota; John Martin, María de Villota, Bruno Méndez, Paul Meijer; María de Villota
16	(Portugal) F.C. Porto	Europe	F.C. Porto	2008; 2009; 2010	Tristan Gommendy; Tristan Gommendy, Álvaro Parente; Álvaro Parente, Earl Bamber
17	(Scotland) Rangers F.C.	Europe	Rangers F.C.	2008; 2009	Ryan Dalziel, James Walker; John Martin
18	(Spain) Sevilla FC	Europe	Sevilla FC	2008; 2009; 2010	Borja García; Esteban Guerrieri, Sébastien Bourdais; Marcos Martínez
19	(England) Tottenham Hotspur	Europe	Tottenham Hotspur F.C.	2008; 2009; 2010	Duncan Tappy, Dominik Jackson; Craig Dolby; Craig Dolby
21 1 (in 2010)	(England) Liverpool F.C.	Europe	Liverpool F.C.	2008; 2009; 2010	Adrián Vallés; Adrián Vallés; James Walker, Frédéric Vervisch
22	(Italy) A.S. Roma	Europe	A.S. Roma	2008; 2009; 2010	Enrico Toccacelo, Franck Perera; Jonathan Kennard, Franck Perera, Julien Jousse; Julien Jousse, Máximo Cortés
24	(Denmark) FC Midtjylland	Europe	FC Midtjylland	2009	Kasper Andersen
24	Team Australia	Oceania	none	2011	John Martin
31	Team England	Europe	none	2011	Craig Dolby
33 3 (in 2011)	(France) GD Bordeaux	Europe	FC Girondins de Bordeaux	2010; 2011	Franck Montagny, Jaap van Lagen, Celso Míguez, Franck Perera; Tristan Gommendy
69	(France) Olympique Lyonnais	Europe	Olympique Lyonnais	2009; 2010	Nelson Panciatici; Sébastien Bourdais, Franck Perera, Celso Míguez, Tristan Gommendy
88 11 (in 2011)	Team China	Asia	none	2010; 2011	Qinghua Ma, Adderly Fong; Ho-Pin Tung

== Football clubs' race statistics ==
Races 1 and 2

No.	Football Club	Starts	Poles	Wins	Pods	FLs	Points
2	(Portugal) Sporting CP	34 / 34	0	1	3	0	544
3	(Italy) A.C. Milan	47 / 48	1	5	12	4	1226
4	(Turkey) Galatasaray S.K.	47 / 48	0	1	6	1	869
5	(Netherlands) PSV Eindhoven	46 / 46	0	2	6	2	766
6	(United Arab Emirates) Al Ain	16 / 16	0	2	2	0	379
7	(Brazil) CR Flamengo	46 / 48	0	0	8	1	914
8	(Belgium) R.S.C. Anderlecht	47 / 48	3	3	13	4	1262
9	(Greece) Olympiacos CFP	48 / 48	3	5	12	3	1087
10	(Switzerland) FC Basel 1893	45 / 48	1	2	7	6	1153
11	(Germany) Borussia Dortmund	11 / 12	1	1	2	1	218
12 / 24	(China) Beijing Guoan	33 / 34	3	7	10	3	842
14	(Brazil) SC Corinthians	46 / 48	3	0	5	5	889
15	(Spain) Atlético Madrid	43 / 46	0	0	2	3	598
16	(Portugal) F.C. Porto	47 / 48	1	6	9	3	1064
17	(Scotland) Rangers F.C.	24 / 24	0	0	2	0	468
18	(Spain) Sevilla FC	44 / 44	2	3	7	0	868
19	(England) Tottenham Hotspur	48 / 48	1	3	15	4	1316
21 / 1	(England) Liverpool F.C.	48 / 48	2	4	9	4	1164
22	(Italy) A.S. Roma	48 / 48	2	1	7	1	967
24	(Denmark) FC Midtjylland	12 / 12	1	0	1	0	203
33	(France) GD Bordeaux	21 / 22	0	1	3	1	365
69	(France) Olympique Lyonnais	33 / 34	0	1	2	2	391
88	Team China	3 / 4	0	0	0	0	26

Super Finals

No.	Football Club	Starts	Wins	Pods	Points
2	(Portugal) Sporting CP	1 / 14	0	0	0
3	(Italy) A.C. Milan	9 / 15	1	5	26
4	(Turkey) Galatasaray S.K.	3 / 15	0	0	5
5	(Netherlands) PSV Eindhoven	1 / 14	0	1	4
6	(United Arab Emirates) Al Ain	0 / 1	-	-	-
7	(Brazil) CR Flamengo	4 / 15	0	1	6
8	(Belgium) R.S.C. Anderlecht	12 / 15	4	9	45
9	(Greece) Olympiacos CFP	8 / 15	2	6	27
10	(Switzerland) FC Basel 1893	11 / 15	0	4	27
11	(Germany) Borussia Dortmund	0 / 0	-	-	-
12 / 24	(China) Beijing Guoan	5 / 10	2	4	24
14	(Brazil) SC Corinthians	4 / 15	0	1	2
15	(Spain) Atlético Madrid	1 / 15	0	0	1
16	(Portugal) F.C. Porto	6 / 15	1	1	10
17	(Scotland) Rangers F.C.	1 / 4	1	1	0
18	(Spain) Sevilla FC	3 / 14	1	2	2
19	(England) Tottenham Hotspur	8 / 15	1	4	20
21 / 1	(England) Liverpool F.C.	7 / 15	2	4	12
22	(Italy) A.S. Roma	3 / 15	0	1	9
24	(Denmark) FC Midtjylland	0 / 4	-	-	-
33	(France) GD Bordeaux	2 / 10	0	1	7
69	(France) Olympique Lyonnais	2 / 14	0	0	4
88	Team China	0 / 1	-	-	-

Total

No.	Football Club	Starts	Wins	Pods	Points
2	(Portugal) Sporting CP	35	1	3	544
3	(Italy) A.C. Milan	56	6	17	1252
4	(Turkey) Galatasaray S.K.	50	1	6	874
5	(Netherlands) PSV Eindhoven	47	2	7	770
6	(United Arab Emirates) Al Ain	16	2	2	379
7	(Brazil) CR Flamengo	50	0	9	920
8	(Belgium) R.S.C. Anderlecht	59	7	22	1307
9	(Greece) Olympiacos CFP	56	7	18	1114
10	(Switzerland) FC Basel 1893	56	2	11	1180
11	(Germany) Borussia Dortmund	11	1	2	218
12 / 24	(China) Beijing Guoan	38	9	14	866
14	(Brazil) SC Corinthians	50	0	6	891
15	(Spain) Atlético Madrid	44	0	2	599
16	(Portugal) F.C. Porto	53	7	10	1074
17	(Scotland) Rangers F.C.	24	1	3	468
18	(Spain) Sevilla FC	47	4	9	870
19	(England) Tottenham Hotspur	56	4	19	1336
21 / 1	(England) Liverpool F.C.	55	6	13	1176
22	(Italy) A.S. Roma	51	1	8	976
24	(Denmark) FC Midtjylland	12	0	1	203
33	(France) GD Bordeaux	23	1	4	372
69	(France) Olympique Lyonnais	35	1	2	395
88	Team China	3	0	0	26

Race 3 (the Super Final) results apply only for certain rounds: Magny-Cours, Donington Park, Estoril and Jarama in 2009, and every race in 2010. Points for the Super Final were only awarded in 2010. The above table may not be fully representative of the truth in a clubs' performance due to the points scoring system change that happened prior to the 2010 season. Fluctuations in the number of clubs taking part in any given race and the total number of races any club has taken part in overall may also lead to statistical misrepresentations in the data.
