= Superleague Formula round Italy =

- ACI Vallelunga Circuit / Adria International Raceway / Autodromo Nazionale Monza

Event information
- No. of events: 3
- First held: 2008
- Last held: 2010
- Most wins (club): (Belgium) R.S.C. Anderlecht 2 (Spain) Sevilla FC 2
- Most wins (driver): (Italy) Davide Rigon 3

Last event (2010 Adria) winners
Race 1	(Belgium) R.S.C. Anderlecht	Davide Rigon
Race 2	(Spain) Sevilla FC	Marcos Martínez
S. Final	(Belgium) R.S.C. Anderlecht	Davide Rigon

The Superleague Formula round Italy is a round of the Superleague Formula. ACI Vallelunga Circuit hosted the first Italian event in 2008. In 2009 Autodromo Nazionale Monza hosted their first event.

== Winners ==
Season	Race	Club	Driver	Location	Date	Report
2008	R1	(China) Beijing Guoan	(Italy) Davide Rigon	ACI Vallelunga Circuit	November 2	Report
2008	R2	(Portugal) F.C. Porto	(France) Tristan Gommendy	ACI Vallelunga Circuit	November 2	Report
2009	R1	(Spain) Sevilla FC	(France) Sébastien Bourdais	Autodromo Nazionale Monza	October 4	Report
2009	R2	(Portugal) Sporting CP	(Portugal) Pedro Petiz	Autodromo Nazionale Monza	October 4	Report
2010	R1	(Belgium) R.S.C. Anderlecht	(Italy) Davide Rigon	Adria International Raceway	September 5	Report
2010	R2	(Spain) Sevilla FC	(Spain) Marcos Martínez	Adria International Raceway	September 5	Report
2010	SF	(Belgium) R.S.C. Anderlecht	(Italy) Davide Rigon	Adria International Raceway	September 5	Report
