= Superleague Formula round Netherlands =

Name

- TT Circuit Assen

Event information
- No. of events: 2
- First held: 2010
- Last held: 2011
- Most wins (club): (Belgium) R.S.C. Anderlecht (2)
- Most wins (driver): (Italy) Davide Rigon (2)

Last event (2011 Assen) winners
Race 1	Netherlands – PSV	Yelmer Buurman
Race 2	Japan	Duncan Tappy
S. Final	England	Craig Dolby

The Superleague Formula round Netherlands is a round of the Superleague Formula. The Netherlands and TT Circuit Assen didn't host an event until 2010, the third season of the series.

== Winners ==
Season	Race	Club	Driver	Location	Date	Report
2010	R1	(Belgium) R.S.C. Anderlecht	(Italy) Davide Rigon	TT Circuit Assen	May 16	Report
2010	R2	(Greece) Olympiacos CFP	(New Zealand) Chris van der Drift	TT Circuit Assen	May 16	Report
2010	SF	(Belgium) R.S.C. Anderlecht	(Italy) Davide Rigon	TT Circuit Assen	May 16	Report
2011	R1	Netherlands – PSV	(Netherlands) Yelmer Buurman	TT Circuit Assen	June 5	Report
2011	R2	Japan	(United Kingdom) Duncan Tappy	TT Circuit Assen	June 5	Report
2011	SF	England	(United Kingdom) Craig Dolby	TT Circuit Assen	June 5	Report
