= Superleague Formula round France =

- Circuit de Nevers Magny-Cours

Event information
- No. of events: 2
- First held: 2009
- Last held: 2010
- Most wins (club): (Italy) A.C. Milan 3
- Most wins (driver): (Netherlands) Yelmer Buurman 2 (Spain) Adrián Vallés 2

Last event (2010 Magny-Cours) winners
Race 1	(Italy) A.C. Milan	Yelmer Buurman
Race 2	(Switzerland) FC Basel 1893	Max Wissel
S. Final	(Italy) A.C. Milan	Yelmer Buurman

The Superleague Formula round France is a round of the Superleague Formula. Circuit de Nevers Magny-Cours hosted the first French event in 2009, and again in 2010.

== Winners ==
Season	Race	Club	Driver	Location	Date	Report
2009	R1	(England) Liverpool F.C.	(Spain) Adrián Vallés	Circuit de Nevers Magny-Cours	June 28	Report
2009	R2	(Italy) A.C. Milan	(Italy) Giorgio Pantano	Circuit de Nevers Magny-Cours	June 28	Report
2009	SF	(England) Liverpool F.C.	(Spain) Adrián Vallés	Circuit de Nevers Magny-Cours	June 28	Report
2010	R1	(Italy) A.C. Milan	(Netherlands) Yelmer Buurman	Circuit de Nevers Magny-Cours	May 23	Report
2010	R2	(Switzerland) FC Basel 1893	(Germany) Max Wissel	Circuit de Nevers Magny-Cours	May 23	Report
2010	SF	(Italy) A.C. Milan	(Netherlands) Yelmer Buurman	Circuit de Nevers Magny-Cours	May 23	Report
