= Adria International Raceway =

Race track in Italy

- Full Circuit (2002–2020)
- Location: Adria, Veneto, Italy
- Coordinates: 45°2′39″N 12°8′51″E
- Broke ground: 2001
- Opened: 2002
- Closed: March 2022; 4 years ago
- Major events: WTCR Race of Italy (2021); Italian F4 (2014–2018); TCR Trophy Europe (2017); Italian Superturismo Championship (2004, 2007–2011, 2013, 2016–2017); NASCAR Whelen Euro Series (2016); DTM (2003–2004, 2010); Superleague Formula (2010); FIA GT (2006–2009); Lamborghini Super Trofeo Europe (2009); Superstars Series (2005–2009); European Touring Car Cup (2007); Italian GT (2002, 2007); F3 Euro Series (2003–2004)
- Website: https://www.adriaraceway.com/

Full Circuit (2021–2022)
- Length: 3.745 km (2.327 mi)
- Race lap record: 1:51.459 ( (Belgium) Frédéric Vervisch, Audi RS 3 LMS TCR (2021), 2021, TCR)

Full Circuit (2002–2020)
- Length: 2.702 km (1.679 mi)
- Race lap record: 1:06.580 ( (Germany) Max Wissel, Panoz DP09, 2010, Superleague Formula)

Adria International Raceway was a motorsport race track near Adria in the Veneto region of Northern Italy. It was a permanent road course, the venue has hosted the FIA GT Championship, Italian Formula Three, Deutsche Tourenwagen Masters and the Formula Three Euroseries. In 2021, the circuit shape was changed and the circuit length was extended to 3.745 km (2.327 mi) in order to host WTCR races in the 2021 season. In March 2022, the circuit was closed due to its debts.

== Use in simulations / games ==
The 2004 video game TOCA Race Driver 2, includes the circuit in the DTM section of the game. It was also used in the 2009 game Superstars V8 Racing.

== Events ==
- 3000 Pro Series (2005)
- Deutsche Tourenwagen Masters (2003–2004, 2010)
- European Touring Car Cup (2007)
- Euroseries 3000 (2006)
- FIA GT Championship (2006–2009)
- FIA GT3 European Championship (2009)
- Formula 3 Euro Series (2003–2004)
- Formula Abarth Italian Championship (2008–2009, 2013)
- Formula BMW ADAC (2003–2004)
- GT4 European Cup (2009)
- Italian F4 Championship (2014–2018)
- Italian Formula Renault Championship (2003–2004, 2009)
- Italian Formula Three Championship (2004–2009, 2011)
- Italian GT Championship (2002, 2007)
- Italian Superturismo Championship (2004, 2007–2011, 2013, 2016–2017)
- Lamborghini Super Trofeo Europe (2009)
- NASCAR Whelen Euro Series (2016)
- Porsche Carrera Cup Germany (2003–2004)
- Porsche Carrera Cup Italia (2007, 2009–2010)
- Superleague Formula
  - Superleague Formula round Italy (2010)
- Superstars Series (2005–2009)
- TCR Trophy Europe (2017)
- World Touring Car Cup
  - FIA WTCR Race of Italy (2021)

== Lap records ==
The fastest official race lap records at the Adria International Raceway are listed as:

Category	Time	Driver	Vehicle	Event
Full Circuit (2021–2022): 3.745 km (2.327 mi)
TCR Touring Car	1:51.459	Frédéric Vervisch	Audi RS 3 LMS TCR (2021)	2021 WTCR Race of Italy
Full Circuit (2002–2020): 2.702 km (1.679 mi)
Superleague Formula	1:06.580	Max Wissel	Panoz DP09	2010 Adria Superleague Formula round
F3000	1:08.193	Marco Bonanomi	Lola B02/50	2006 Adria Euroseries 3000 round
Formula Three	1:10.425	Ryan Briscoe	Dallara F303	2003 Adria F3 Euro Series round
DTM	1:11.669	Bernd Schneider	AMG Mercedes-Benz CLK DTM 2003	2003 Adria DTM round
GT1 (GTS)	1:12.462	Thomas Biagi	Maserati MC12 GT1	2006 FIA GT Adria 500km
Formula Renault 2.0	1:14.633	Pastor Maldonado	Tatuus FR2000	2004 Adria Formula Renault 2000 Italia round
Formula 4	1:14.815	João Vieira	Tatuus F4-T014	2014 Adria Formula 4 Winter Trophy
Formula Abarth	1:15.132	Federico Pezzolla	Tatuus FA010	2013 Adria Formula Abarth round
N-GT	1:15.638	Antonio de Castro	Porsche 911 (996) GT3-R	2002 Adria Italian GT round
GT2	1:15.828	Matteo Bobbi	Ferrari F430 GT2	2006 FIA GT Adria 500km
GT3	1:16.188	Dino Lunardi	Ford GT GT3	2009 Adria FIA GT3 round
Formula BMW	1.17.814	Sebastian Vettel	Mygale FB02	2004 Adria Formula BMW ADAC round
Porsche Carrera Cup	1:18.122	Andrea Sonvico	Porsche 911 (997 I) GT3 Cup	2007 Adria Porsche Carrera Cup Italia round
TCR Touring Car	1:20.367	Gabriele Tarquini	Hyundai i30 N TCR	2017 TCR Trophy Europe
Super 2000	1:22.879	Pontus Mörth	Chevrolet Lacetti	2007 European Touring Car Cup
GT4	1:22.911	Jens Richter	Chevrolet Corvette C6 GT4	2009 Adria European GT4 Cup round
Stock car racing	1:31.841	Alon Day	Chevrolet SS NASCAR	2016 Adria NASCAR Whelen Euro Series round
Super 1600	1:32.048	Jens-Guido Weimann	Ford Fiesta ST	2007 European Touring Car Cup
