= Liverpool F.C. (disambiguation) =

Liverpool F.C. is a professional association football club based in Liverpool, England.

Liverpool F.C. may also refer to:

- Liverpool F.C. Women, the women's division of the football club based in St Helens, Merseyside
- Liverpool F.C. (Montevideo), an Uruguayan football club based in Montevideo
- A.F.C Liverpool an English football club in the North West Counties League
- Liverpool F.C. (Superleague Formula team), an English auto racing team that competed in the Superleague Formula
- Liverpool St Helens F.C., an English rugby union team
