= AS Roma (Superleague Formula team) =

Italian racing team

A.S. Roma SF Racing Team
Founded	2008
Country	Italy
Driver(s)	Enrico Toccacelo (2008); Franck Perera ('08, '09); Jonathan Kennard (2009); Julien Jousse ('09, '10); Máximo Cortés (2010)
First race	2008 Donington
Last race	2010 Navarra
Rounds	24
Ch'ships	0
Total points	976 (including Super Finals)
2010 position	8th (458 pts)
Races / Poles / Wins / Podiums / F. Laps; 48 / 2 / 1 / 7 / 1
NOTE - Data not including Super Finals

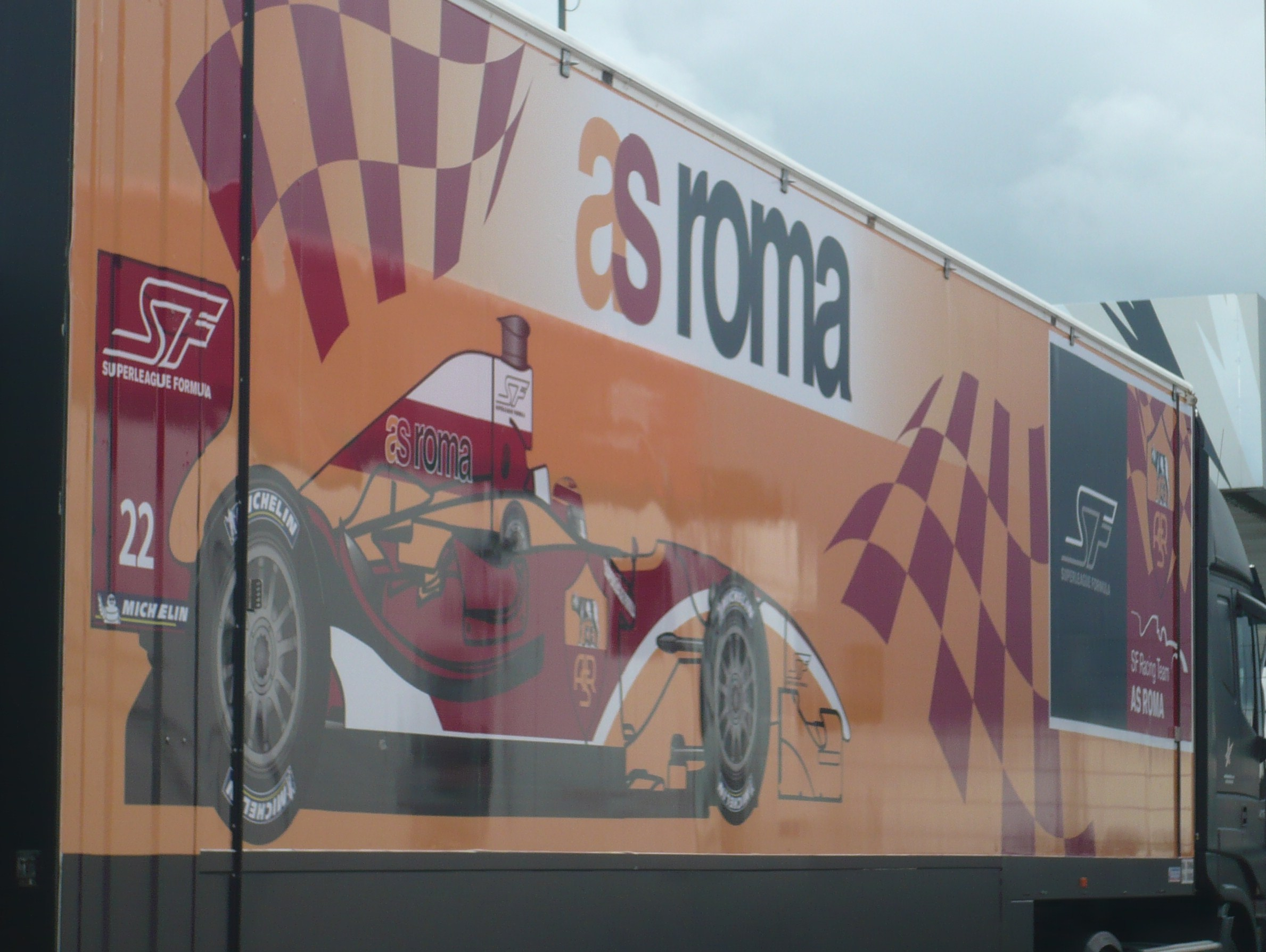
The A.S. Roma team truck in Silverstone Circuit's paddock (2010)

A.S. Roma Superleague Formula team was the racing team of A.S. Roma, a football team that competes in Italy in the Serie A. The A.S. Roma racing team competes in the Superleague Formula.

== 2008 season ==
In the 2008 Superleague Formula season Enrico Toccacelo was in the car for the first three rounds and Franck Perera was in for the last 3 rounds. The team's best finish was 2nd.

== 2009 season ==
For the 2009 Superleague Formula season Jonathan Kennard was announced the driver in a surprise move. For the Estoril round of the season Alan Docking Racing replaced Azerti Motorsport in the running of the car and Franck Perera returned to the car.

== Record ==
(key)

=== 2008 ===
Operator(s)	Driver(s)	1		2		3		4		5		6		Points	Rank
Operator(s)	Driver(s)	DON		NÜR		ZOL		EST		VAL		JER		Points	Rank
FMS International	(Italy) Enrico Toccacelo	2	10	17	4	13	7							307	5th
FMS International	(France) Franck Perera							3	16	15	2	5	5	307	5th

=== 2009 ===
- Super Final results in 2009 did not count for points towards the main championship.

Operator(s)	Driver(s)	1			2			3			4			5			6			Points	Rank
Operator(s)	Driver(s)	MAG			ZOL			DON			EST			MOZ			JAR			Points	Rank
Azerti Motorsport	(United Kingdom) Jonathan Kennard	15	14	X	11	5	–	7	10	X										211	13th
Alan Docking Racing	(France) Franck Perera										7	12	X							211	13th
Alan Docking Racing	(France) Julien Jousse													3	17	–	15	16	X	211	13th

=== 2010 ===
Operator(s)	Driver(s)	1			2			3			4			5			6			7			8			9			10			NC			11			Points	Rank
Operator(s)	Driver(s)	SIL			ASS			MAG			JAR			NÜR			ZOL			BRH			ADR			POR			ORD			BEI			NAV			Points	Rank
EmiliodeVillota Motorsport	(France) Julien Jousse	8	13	X	4	12	X	13	2	4	14	2	5	5	14	X	15	1	3	17	5	X	5	14	X	13	10	X	11	16	X	8	13	C				458	8th
EmiliodeVillota Motorsport	(Spain) Máximo Cortés																																		18	5	X	458	8th
