= 2008 Donington Park Superleague Formula round =

2008 Donington Park Superleague Formula round Superleague Formula round UK
- Circuit Map
- Date: 31 August, 2008
- Location: (United Kingdom) Donington Park, Leicestershire, England
- Course: Permanent racing facility 2.500 mi (4.023 km)
- Laps: 28 & 22
Pole position
Team	(China) Beijing Guoan	Davide Rigon
- Time: 1:18.529
Podium (1st race)
First	(China) Beijing Guoan	Davide Rigon
Second	(Italy) A.S. Roma	Enrico Toccacelo
Third	(England) Tottenham Hotspur	Duncan Tappy
Fastest lap (1st race)
Team	(China) Beijing Guoan	Davide Rigon
- Time: 1:20.183 (on lap 10)
Podium (2nd race)
First	(Spain) Sevilla FC	Borja García
Second	(Brazil) CR Flamengo	Tuka Rocha
Third	(England) Liverpool F.C.	Adrián Vallés
Fastest lap (2nd race)
Team	(Netherlands) PSV Eindhoven	Yelmer Buurman
- Time: 1:40.926 (on lap 22)

The 2008 Donington Park Superleague Formula round was the inaugural round of the Superleague Formula championship, with the races taking place on 31 August 2008. Seventeen football teams were represented on the grid, with a win each for Beijing Guoan and Sevilla FC.

== Report ==
=== Qualifying ===
The first ever qualifying session for Superleague saw the introduction of a new qualifying system. Following a random draw which split the seventeen-car field into two groups, the fastest four qualifiers from each progressed into the knockout stages to decide places 1 to 8 on the grid. This meant that in Group B, fifth placed Al Ain (Andreas Zuber) and sixth placed Borussia Dortmund (Nelson Philippe) would both miss out on qualifying for the knockout stages, despite recording a time some four tenths of a second faster than fourth-placed Group A qualifier Galatasaray S.K. (Alessandro Pier Guidi). After negotiating their way through the knockout stages, Sevilla FC (Borja García) and Beijing Guoan (Davide Rigon) would meet in the final. In the one-lap shootout, Rigon came out on top by 0.822 seconds and would become Superleague's inaugural pole-sitter.

=== Race 1 ===
The race began with a rolling start, to eradicate a potential chink in the 750 bhp car's armour, and would also delay the introduction of pitstops until the next round. From the start, the Olympiacos car of Kasper Andersen got a fantastic run from fourth on the grid, and was alongside Rigon as the grid headed for Redgate. However, he ran wide and fell back to fourth behind García and a fast-starting Yelmer Buurman in the PSV Eindhoven car. This would become fifth by the end of the lap, as Duncan Tappy also got by, in the Tottenham Hotspur machine. The safety car was deployed on lap three, as A.C. Milan and CR Flamengo had both gone off at Coppice with engine failures on the first and third laps respectively. There were further problems down the field with a midfield incident between Philippe and Andy Soucek in the SC Corinthians car and both would later retire from the race. Enrico Toccacelo would also become a factor in the race, having started sixth in the A.S. Roma car, moving up to third which became second, as García had to shift to manual gear-shifting after developing a problem on down-shifts. Toccacelo did get to within a second and a half of Rigon, but the Italian in the Chinese team's car would hold on, to be the first race-winner of the series. Toccacelo finished 2nd, while Tappy just held off Buurman for the final podium spot. Star of the race though, fell to Adrián Vallés. Having missed qualifying due to an electrical problem, the Liverpool F.C. car charged through from 17th on the grid, to finish fifth ahead of the other finishers Zuber, Tristan Gommendy (F.C. Porto), Ryan Dalziel (Rangers F.C.), Max Wissel (FC Basel 1893) and the troubled García. Of the seven retirees, six were down to technical problems.

=== Race 2 ===
A storm engulfed the track, before the start of race two. With the reverse grid system in use, A.C. Milan were expected to start on pole, but did not start due to the fuel-system failure that took Robert Doornbos out of the first race. This put Flamengo on the pole, and would give Tuka Rocha an advantage at the start of the race. Rocha sped away into the distance as all hell broke loose behind. Zuber would go off at the Old Hairpin, who would later deploy the safety car and Philippe, who had challenged Rocha at Redgate, spun down to fifth at Coppice, letting Pier Guidi, Wissel and García through. As quickly as the safety car had gone in, it was back out again after Dalziel and latterly Pier Guidi had both gone off at Hollywood and Wissel had run wide at Melbourne in the Basel car. This left García to charge down Rocha at a rate of knots, and with eight laps to go, caught and passed Rocha in the Melbourne Loop and scampered off to a 10.074-second victory over Rocha. The battle for the final podium spot was decided on lap twenty, when Philippe slid sideways and knocked on his pit-lane limiter which allowed Vallés, who started 12th on the grid into third and third in the championship. Tappy, Rigon, Wissel, Buurman, Gommendy, Toccacelo and Andersen completed the finishers as 11 of the 16 starters finished the race. Rigon's first and sixth allowed Beijing Guoan to be seven points clear of Tottenham and Liverpool in the standings.

== Results ==
=== Qualifying ===
- In each group, the top four qualify for the quarter-finals.

==== Group A ====
Pos.	Team	Driver	Time
1	(Spain) Sevilla FC	(Spain) Borja García	1:19.822
2	(Netherlands) PSV Eindhoven	(Netherlands) Yelmer Buurman	1:19.872
3	(Greece) Olympiacos CFP	(Denmark) Kasper Andersen	1:20.035
4	(Turkey) Galatasaray S.K.	(Italy) Alessandro Pier Guidi	1:20.087
5	(Belgium) R.S.C. Anderlecht	(United Kingdom) Craig Dolby	1:20.685
6	(Brazil) CR Flamengo	(Brazil) Tuka Rocha	1:24.359
7	(Switzerland) FC Basel 1893	(Germany) Max Wissel	no time
8	(England) Liverpool F.C.	(Spain) Adrián Vallés	no time

==== Group B ====
Pos.	Team	Driver	Time
1	(China) Beijing Guoan	(Italy) Davide Rigon	1:18.746
2	(Italy) A.C. Milan	(Netherlands) Robert Doornbos	1:19.155
3	(Italy) A.S. Roma	(Italy) Enrico Toccacelo	1:19.562
4	(England) Tottenham Hotspur	(United Kingdom) Duncan Tappy	1:19.580
5	(United Arab Emirates) Al Ain	(United Arab Emirates) Andreas Zuber	1:19.640
6	(Germany) Borussia Dortmund	(France) Nelson Philippe	1:19.671
7	(Portugal) F.C. Porto	(France) Tristan Gommendy	1:20.440
8	(Brazil) SC Corinthians	(Spain) Andy Soucek	1:20.511
9	(Scotland) Rangers F.C.	(United Kingdom) Ryan Dalziel	1:20.584

==== Knockout stages ====
Quarter-Finals			Semi-Finals			Pole Shoot Out
A1	Sevilla FC	1:19.463
B4	Tottenham Hotspur	1:19.690	A1	Sevilla FC	1:19.655
A3	Olympiacos CFP	1:20.022	A3	Olympiacos CFP	1:20.244
B2	A.C. Milan	1:20.173				A1	Sevilla FC	1:19.351
A2	PSV Eindhoven	1:19.411				B1	Beijing Guoan	1:18.529
B3	A.S. Roma	1:19.977	A2	PSV Eindhoven	1:19.565
A4	Galatasaray S.K.	1:20.683	B1	Beijing Guoan	1:19.071
B1	Beijing Guoan	1:18.566

==== Grid ====
Pos.	Team	Driver	Time
1	(China) Beijing Guoan	(Italy) Davide Rigon	1:18.529
2	(Spain) Sevilla FC	(Spain) Borja García	1:19.351
3	(Netherlands) PSV Eindhoven	(Netherlands) Yelmer Buurman	1:19.565
4	(Greece) Olympiacos CFP	(Denmark) Kasper Andersen	1:20.244
5	(Italy) A.C. Milan	(Netherlands) Robert Doornbos	1:20.173
6	(Italy) A.S. Roma	(Italy) Enrico Toccacelo	1:19.977
7	(Turkey) Galatasaray S.K.	(Italy) Alessandro Pier Guidi	1:20.683
8	(England) Tottenham Hotspur	(United Kingdom) Duncan Tappy	1:19.690
9	(United Arab Emirates) Al Ain	(United Arab Emirates) Andreas Zuber	1:19.640
10	(Germany) Borussia Dortmund	(France) Nelson Philippe	1:19.671
11	(Portugal) F.C. Porto	(France) Tristan Gommendy	1:20.440
12	(Brazil) SC Corinthians	(Spain) Andy Soucek	1:20.511
13	(Scotland) Rangers F.C.	(United Kingdom) Ryan Dalziel	1:20.584
14	(Belgium) R.S.C. Anderlecht	(United Kingdom) Craig Dolby	1:20.685
15	(Brazil) CR Flamengo	(Brazil) Tuka Rocha	1:24.359
16	(Switzerland) FC Basel 1893	(Germany) Max Wissel	no time
17	(England) Liverpool F.C.	(Spain) Adrián Vallés	no time

=== Race 1 ===
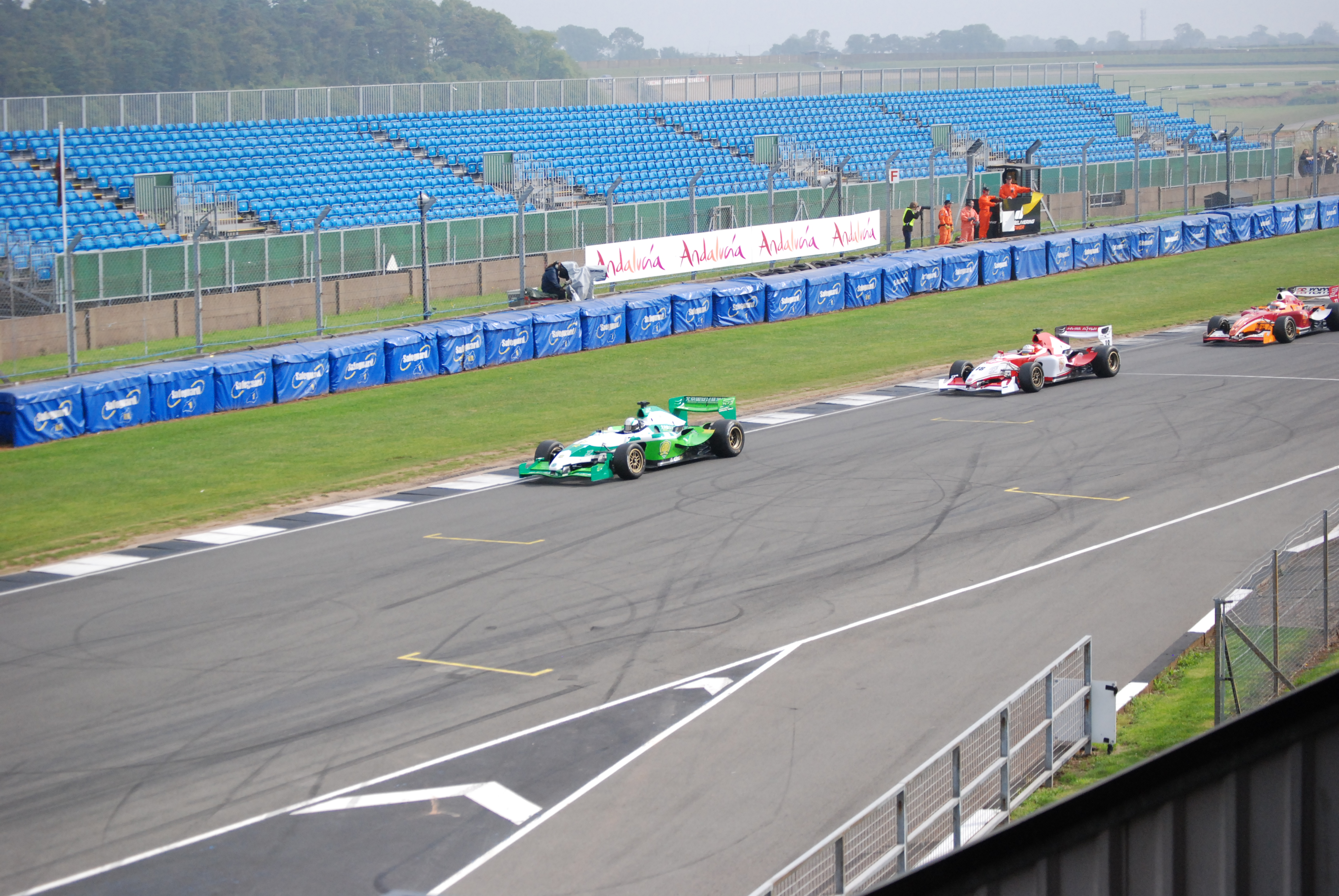
Davide Rigon (green) leads Borja García (red and white) and Enrico Toccacelo (red and orange) under the safety car, during the first race.

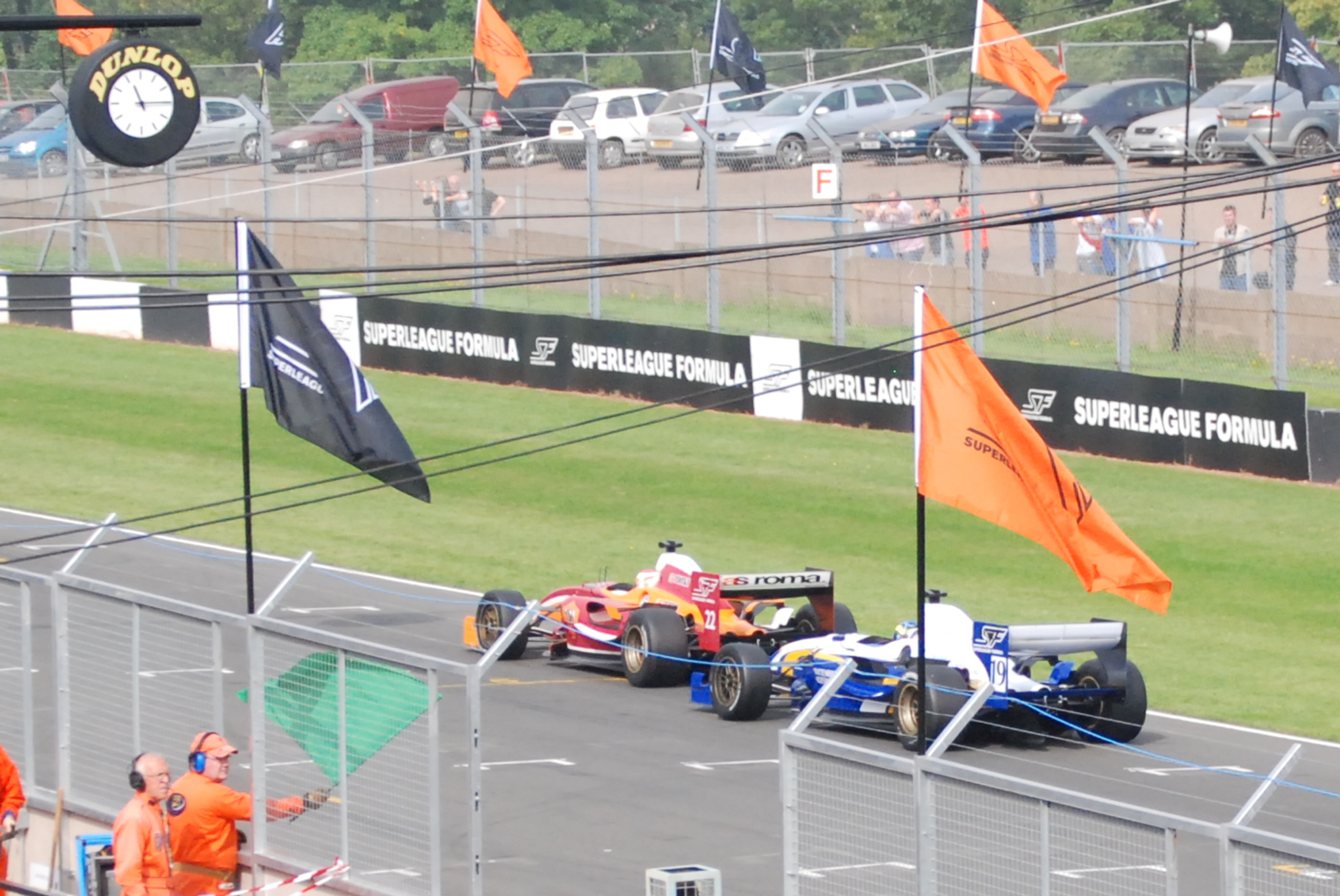
Duncan Tappy (white) lines up a pass on Toccacelo.

Pos	No	Team	Driver	Laps	Time/Retired	Grid	Pts.
1	12	(China) Beijing Guoan	(Italy) Davide Rigon	28	41:29.425	1	50
2	22	(Italy) A.S. Roma	(Italy) Enrico Toccacelo	28	+2.577	6	45
3	19	(England) Tottenham Hotspur	(United Kingdom) Duncan Tappy	28	+14.909	8	40
4	5	(Netherlands) PSV Eindhoven	(Netherlands) Yelmer Buurman	28	+15.305	3	36
5	21	(England) Liverpool F.C.	(Spain) Adrián Vallés	28	+20.184	17	32
6	6	(United Arab Emirates) Al Ain	(United Arab Emirates) Andreas Zuber	28	+22.996	9	29
7	16	(Portugal) F.C. Porto	(France) Tristan Gommendy	28	+23.675	11	26
8	17	(Scotland) Rangers F.C.	(United Kingdom) Ryan Dalziel	28	+24.571	13	23
9	10	(Switzerland) FC Basel 1893	(Germany) Max Wissel	28	+25.449	16	20
10	18	(Spain) Sevilla FC	(Spain) Borja García	28	+29.431	2	18
11	14	(Brazil) SC Corinthians	(Spain) Andy Soucek	14	Alternator	12	16
12	9	(Greece) Olympiacos CFP	(Denmark) Kasper Andersen	10	Water Temp.	4	14
13	4	(Turkey) Galatasaray S.K.	(Italy) Alessandro Pier Guidi	9	Engine	7	12
14	8	(Belgium) R.S.C. Anderlecht	(United Kingdom) Craig Dolby	7	Engine	14	10
15	11	(Germany) Borussia Dortmund	(France) Nelson Philippe	6	Acc. Damage	10	8
16	7	(Brazil) CR Flamengo	(Brazil) Tuka Rocha	2	Engine	15	7
17	3	(Italy) A.C. Milan	(Netherlands) Robert Doornbos	0	Engine	5	6
Fastest lap: Davide Rigon (Beijing Guoan) 1:20.183 (112.243 mph)

=== Race 2 ===
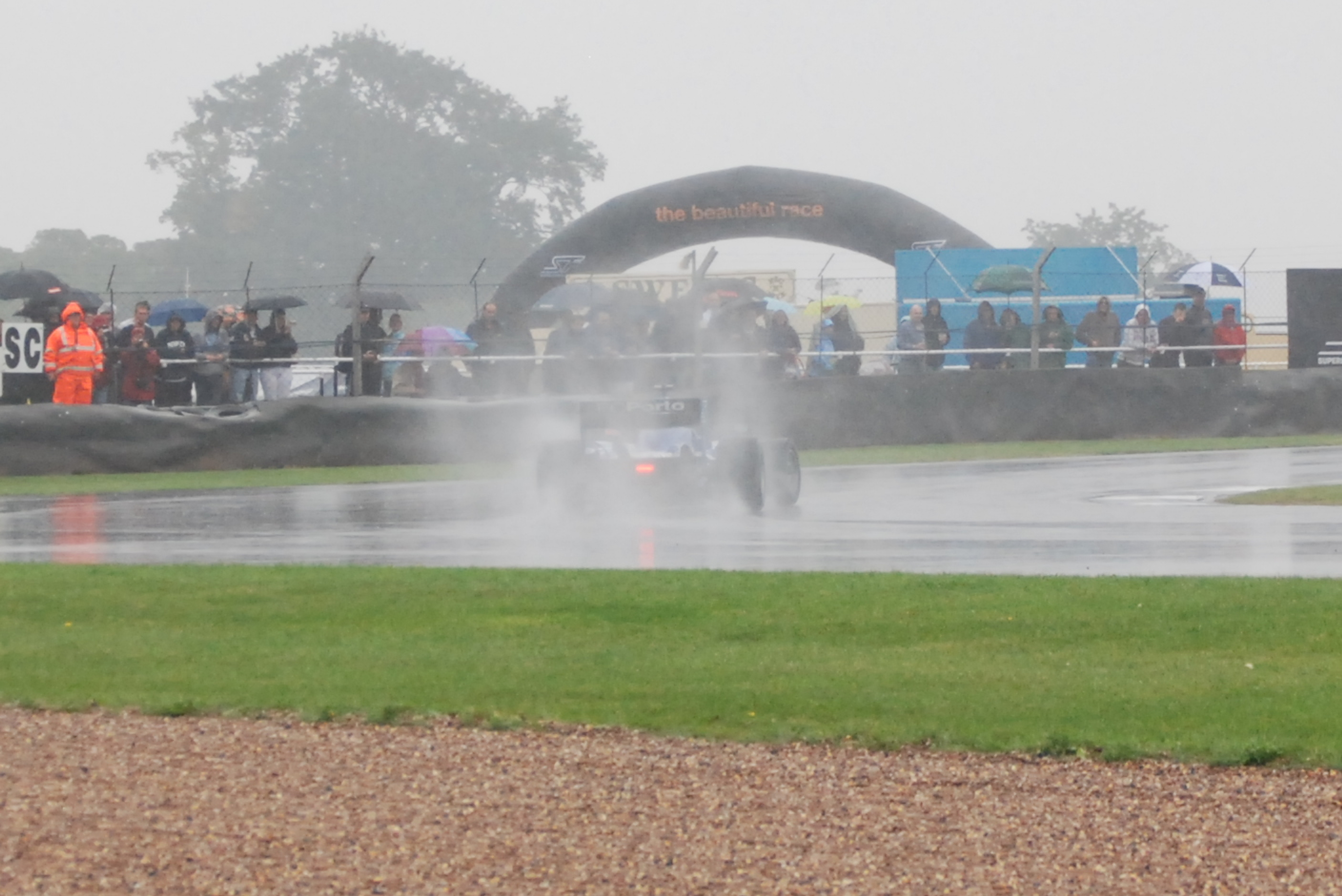
Tristan Gommendy's F.C. Porto car in the treacherous conditions of race two.

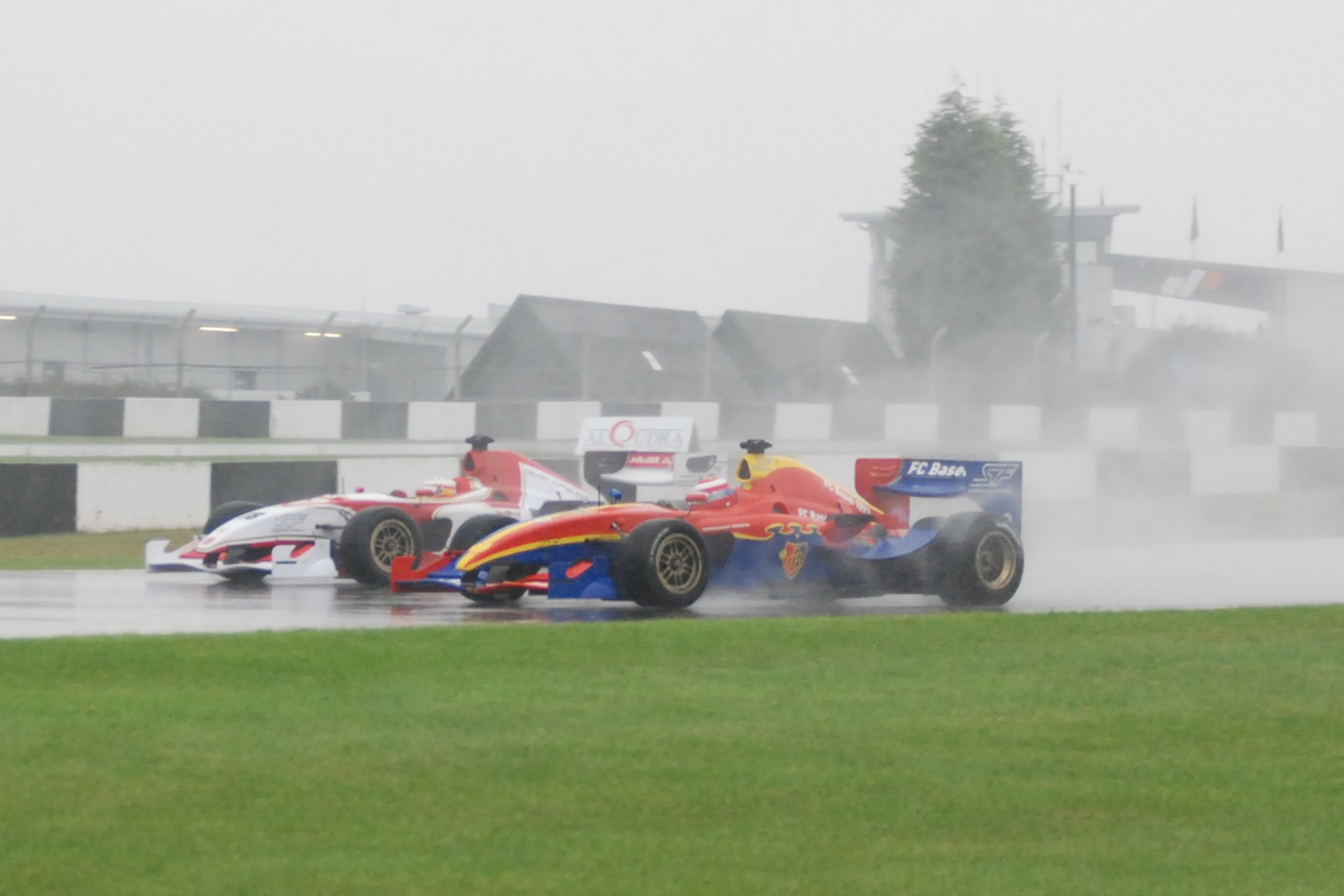
Max Wissel and Borja García tussling for position at the Melbourne Hairpin.

Pos	No	Team	Driver	Laps	Time/Retired	Grid	Pts.
1	18	(Spain) Sevilla FC	(Spain) Borja García	22	41:56.268	7	50
2	7	(Brazil) CR Flamengo	(Brazil) Tuka Rocha	22	+10.074	1	45
3	21	(England) Liverpool F.C.	(Spain) Adrián Vallés	22	+12.224	12	40
4	11	(Germany) Borussia Dortmund	(France) Nelson Philippe	22	+14.962	2	36
5	19	(England) Tottenham Hotspur	(United Kingdom) Duncan Tappy	22	+23.666	14	32
6	12	(China) Beijing Guoan	(Italy) Davide Rigon	22	+24.681	16	29
7	10	(Switzerland) FC Basel 1893	(Germany) Max Wissel	22	+27.225	8	26
8	5	(Netherlands) PSV Eindhoven	(Netherlands) Yelmer Buurman	22	+42.915	13	23
9	16	(Portugal) F.C. Porto	(France) Tristan Gommendy	22	+54.513	10	20
10	22	(Italy) A.S. Roma	(Italy) Enrico Toccacelo	22	+57.398	15	18
11	9	(Greece) Olympiacos CFP	(Denmark) Kasper Andersen	22	+59.946	5	16
12	14	(Brazil) SC Corinthians	(Spain) Andy Soucek	19	Accident	6	14
13	4	(Turkey) Galatasaray S.K.	(Italy) Alessandro Pier Guidi	8	Accident	4	12
14	17	(Scotland) Rangers F.C.	(United Kingdom) Ryan Dalziel	6	Accident	9	10
15	6	(United Arab Emirates) Al Ain	(United Arab Emirates) Andreas Zuber	0	Accident	11	8
16	8	(Belgium) R.S.C. Anderlecht	(United Kingdom) Craig Dolby	0	Engine	3	7
DNS	3	(Italy) A.C. Milan	(Netherlands) Robert Doornbos		Engine		0
Fastest lap: Yelmer Buurman (PSV Eindhoven) 1:40.926 (89.174 mph)

- Olympiacos CFP started from the pitlane.

== Notes ==
- First race: All teams and drivers
- First pole (Driver): Davide Rigon
- First pole (Team): Beijing Guoan
- First win (Driver): Davide Rigon & Borja García
- Last win (Driver): Borja García
- First win (Team): Beijing Guoan & Sevilla FC
- First podium (Driver): Davide Rigon, Enrico Toccacelo, Duncan Tappy, Borja García, Tuka Rocha, Adrian Valles
- First podium (Team): Beijing Guoan, A.S. Roma, Tottenham Hotspur, Sevilla FC, CR Flamengo, Liverpool F.C.
- Last podium (Driver): Enrico Toccacelo, Borja García, Tuka Rocha
- First fastest lap (Driver): Davide Rigon & Yelmer Buurman
- First fastest lap (Team): Beijing Guoan & PSV Eindhoven
- World Feed Commentators: Jonathan Green & Bruce Jouanny
