= 2009 Monza Superleague Formula round =

2009 Monza Superleague Formula round Superleague Formula round Italy
- Circuit Map
- Date: October 4, 2009
- Location: Autodromo Nazionale Monza, Monza, Italy
- Course: Permanent racing facility 3.6 mi (5.8 km)
- Laps: 25 & 25
Pole position
| Team | (Greece) Olympiacos CFP | Esteban Guerrieri |
- Time: 1:37.649
Podium (1st race)
| First | (Spain) Sevilla FC | Sébastien Bourdais |
| Second | (Greece) Olympiacos CFP | Esteban Guerrieri |
| Third | (Italy) A.S. Roma | Julien Jousse |
Fastest lap (1st race)
| Team | (Brazil) SC Corinthians | Antônio Pizzonia |
- Time: 1:36.466 (on lap 21)
Podium (2nd race)
| First | (Portugal) Sporting CP | Pedro Petiz |
| Second | (England) Tottenham Hotspur | Craig Dolby |
| Third | (Spain) Sevilla FC | Sébastien Bourdais |
Fastest lap (2nd race)
| Team | (Greece) Olympiacos CFP | Esteban Guerrieri |
- Time: 1:36.681 (on lap 12)

The 2009 Monza Superleague Formula round was the fifth round of the 2009 Superleague Formula season, with the races taking place on October 4, 2009.

== Results ==
=== Qualifying ===
- In each group, the top four qualify for the quarter-finals.

==== Group A ====
| Pos. | Team | Driver | Time |
|---|---|---|---|
| 1 | (Switzerland) FC Basel 1893 | (Germany) Max Wissel | 1:36.444 |
| 2 | (Portugal) F.C. Porto | (France) Tristan Gommendy | 1:37.001 |
| 3 | (Italy) A.S. Roma | (France) Julien Jousse | 1:37.066 |
| 4 | (Turkey) Galatasaray S.K. | (China) Ho-Pin Tung | 1:37.392 |
| 5 | (England) Tottenham Hotspur | (United Kingdom) Craig Dolby | 1:37.441 |
| 6 | (Brazil) SC Corinthians | (Brazil) Antônio Pizzonia | 1:37.528 |
| 7 | (France) Olympique Lyonnais | (France) Nelson Panciatici | 1:37.642 |
| 8 | (Portugal) Sporting CP | (Portugal) Pedro Petiz | 1:38.068 |
| 9 | (Netherlands) PSV Eindhoven | (Netherlands) Carlo van Dam | 1:38.257 |

==== Group B ====
| Pos. | Team | Driver | Time |
|---|---|---|---|
| 1 | (Spain) Sevilla FC | (France) Sébastien Bourdais | 1:36.533 |
| 2 | (Greece) Olympiacos CFP | (Argentina) Esteban Guerrieri | 1:36.674 |
| 3 | (Italy) A.C. Milan | (Italy) Giorgio Pantano | 1:36.837 |
| 4 | (England) Liverpool F.C. | (Spain) Adrián Vallés | 1:36.889 |
| 5 | (Belgium) R.S.C. Anderlecht | (Netherlands) Yelmer Buurman | 1:36.931 |
| 6 | (Scotland) Rangers F.C. | (Australia) John Martin | 1:37.091 |
| 7 | (Denmark) FC Midtjylland | (Denmark) Kasper Andersen | 1:37.254 |
| 8 | (Spain) Atlético Madrid | (Spain) María de Villota | 1:38.672 |
| 9 | (Brazil) CR Flamengo | (United Kingdom) Jonathan Kennard | N/A |

==== Knockout stages ====
| Quarter-Finals | | | Semi-Finals | | | Pole Shoot Out |
| A1 | FC Basel 1893 | 1:37.135 |
| B4 | Liverpool F.C. | 1:37.441 | A1 | FC Basel 1893 | 1:36.942 |
| A3 | A.S. Roma | 1:37.537 | B2 | Olympiacos CFP | 1:36.786 |
| B2 | Olympiacos CFP | 1:36.818 | | | | B2 | Olympiacos CFP | 1:37.649 |
| A2 | F.C. Porto | 1:38.183 | | | | B1 | Sevilla FC | 1:55.870 |
| B3 | A.C. Milan | 1:37.055 | B3 | A.C. Milan | 1:37.111 |
| A4 | Galatasaray S.K. | 1:38.276 | B1 | Sevilla FC | 1:36.745 |
| B1 | Sevilla FC | 1:37.043 |

==== Grid ====
| Pos. | Team | Driver | Time |
|---|---|---|---|
| 1 | (Greece) Olympiacos CFP | (Argentina) Esteban Guerrieri | 1:37.649 |
| 2 | (Spain) Sevilla FC | (France) Sébastien Bourdais | 1:55.870 |
| 3 | (Italy) A.C. Milan | (Italy) Giorgio Pantano | 1:37.111 |
| 4 | (Switzerland) FC Basel 1893 | (Germany) Max Wissel | 1:36.942 |
| 5 | (Italy) A.S. Roma | (France) Julien Jousse | 1:37.537 |
| 6 | (Portugal) F.C. Porto | (France) Tristan Gommendy | 1:38.183 |
| 7 | (Turkey) Galatasaray S.K. | (China) Ho-Pin Tung | 1:38.276 |
| 8 | (England) Liverpool F.C. | (Spain) Adrián Vallés | 1:37.441 |
| 9 | (England) Tottenham Hotspur | (United Kingdom) Craig Dolby | 1:37.441 |
| 10 | (Belgium) R.S.C. Anderlecht | (Netherlands) Yelmer Buurman | 1:36.931 |
| 11 | (Brazil) SC Corinthians | (Brazil) Antônio Pizzonia | 1:37.528 |
| 12 | (Scotland) Rangers F.C. | (Australia) John Martin | 1:37.091 |
| 13 | (France) Olympique Lyonnais | (France) Nelson Panciatici | 1:37.642 |
| 14 | (Denmark) FC Midtjylland | (Denmark) Kasper Andersen | 1:37.254 |
| 15 | (Portugal) Sporting CP | (Portugal) Pedro Petiz | 1:38.068 |
| 16 | (Spain) Atlético Madrid | (Spain) María de Villota | 1:38.672 |
| 17 | (Netherlands) PSV Eindhoven | (Netherlands) Carlo van Dam | 1:38.257 |
| 18 | (Brazil) CR Flamengo | (United Kingdom) Jonathan Kennard | N/A |

=== Race 1 ===
| Pos | No | Team | Driver | Laps | Time/Retired | Grid | Pts. |
|---|---|---|---|---|---|---|---|
| 1 | 18 | (Spain) Sevilla FC | (France) Sébastien Bourdais | 25 | 41:26.833 | 2 | 50 |
| 2 | 9 | (Greece) Olympiacos CFP | (Argentina) Esteban Guerrieri | 25 | + 0.375 | 1 | 45 |
| 3 | 22 | (Italy) A.S. Roma | (France) Julien Jousse | 25 | + 14.930 | 5 | 40 |
| 4 | 21 | (England) Liverpool F.C. | (Spain) Adrián Vallés | 25 | + 18.014 | 8 | 36 |
| 5 | 19 | (England) Tottenham Hotspur | (United Kingdom) Craig Dolby | 25 | + 22.078 | 9 | 32 |
| 6 | 8 | (Belgium) R.S.C. Anderlecht | (Netherlands) Yelmer Buurman | 25 | + 25.536 | 10 | 29 |
| 7 | 16 | (Portugal) F.C. Porto | (France) Tristan Gommendy | 25 | + 27.342 | 6 | 26 |
| 8 | 4 | (Turkey) Galatasaray S.K. | (China) Ho-Pin Tung | 25 | + 29.568 | 7 | 23 |
| 9 | 10 | (Switzerland) FC Basel 1893 | (Germany) Max Wissel | 25 | + 35.894 | 4 | 20 |
| 10 | 14 | (Brazil) SC Corinthians | (Brazil) Antônio Pizzonia | 25 | + 38.378 | 11 | 18 |
| 11 | 17 | (Scotland) Rangers F.C. | (Australia) John Martin | 25 | + 51.734 | 12 | 16 |
| 12 | 24 | (Denmark) FC Mitjylland | (Denmark) Kasper Andersen | 25 | + 55.320 | 14 | 14 |
| 13 | 69 | (France) Olympique Lyonnais | (France) Nelson Panciatici | 25 | + 56.807 | 13 | 12 |
| 14 | 15 | (Spain) Atlético Madrid | (Spain) María de Villota | 25 | + 1:05.661 | 16 | 10 |
| 15 | 3 | (Italy) A.C. Milan | (Italy) Giorgio Pantano | 25 | + 1:10.845 | 3 | 8 |
| 16 | 5 | (Netherlands) PSV Eindhoven | (Netherlands) Carlo van Dam | 25 | + 1:13.588 | 17 | 7 |
| 17 | 7 | (Brazil) CR Flamengo | (United Kingdom) Jonathan Kennard | 25 | + 1:34.720 | 18 | 6 |
| 18 | 2 | (Portugal) Sporting CP | (Portugal) Pedro Petiz | 25 | Retired | 15 | 5 |
Fastest lap: Antônio Pizzonia (SC Corinthians) 1:36.466 (134.33 mph)

=== Race 2 ===
| Pos | No | Team | Driver | Laps | Time/Retired | Grid | Pts. |
|---|---|---|---|---|---|---|---|
| 1 | 2 | (Portugal) Sporting CP | (Portugal) Pedro Petiz | 25 | 41:51.037 | 1 | 50 |
| 2 | 19 | (England) Tottenham Hotspur | (United Kingdom) Craig Dolby | 25 | + 6.051 | 14 | 45 |
| 3 | 18 | (Spain) Sevilla FC | (France) Sebastien Bourdais | 25 | + 11.436 | 18 | 40 |
| 4 | 9 | (Greece) Olympiacos CFP | (Argentina) Esteban Guerrieri | 25 | + 12.945 | 17 | 36 |
| 5 | 21 | (England) Liverpool F.C. | (Spain) Adrián Vallés | 25 | + 18.660 | 15 | 32 |
| 6 | 8 | (Belgium) R.S.C. Anderlecht | (Netherlands) Yelmer Buurman | 25 | + 19.107 | 13 | 29 |
| 7 | 4 | (Turkey) Galatasaray S.K. | (China) Ho-Pin Tung | 25 | + 24.939 | 11 | 26 |
| 8 | 5 | (Netherlands) PSV Eindhoven | (Netherlands) Carlo van Dam | 25 | + 34.379 | 3 | 23 |
| 9 | 14 | (Brazil) SC Corinthians | (Brazil) Antonio Pizzonia | 25 | + 46.858 | 9 | 20 |
| 10 | 15 | (Spain) Atlético Madrid | (Spain) María de Villota | 25 | + 54.555 | 5 | 18 |
| 11 | 3 | (Italy) A.C. Milan | (Italy) Giorgio Pantano | 25 | + 1:07.513 | 4 | 16 |
| 12 | 17 | (Scotland) Rangers F.C. | (Australia) John Martin | 25 | +1:47.547 | 8 | 14 |
| 13 | 16 | (Portugal) F.C. Porto | (France) Tristan Gommendy | 22 | | 12 | 12 |
| 14 | 10 | (Switzerland) FC Basel 1893 | (Germany) Max Wissel | 17 | Gearbox | 10 | 10 |
| 15 | 69 | (France) Olympique Lyonnais | (France) Nelson Panciatici | 15 | Out in Box | 6 | 8 |
| 16 | 24 | (Denmark) FC Mitjylland | (Denmark) Kasper Andersen | 5 | | 7 | 7 |
| 17 | 22 | (Italy) A.S. Roma | (France) Julien Jousse | 2 | Collision | 16 | 6 |
| 18 | 7 | (Brazil) CR Flamengo | (United Kingdom) Jonathan Kennard | 0 | Collision | 2 | 5 |
Fastest lap: Esteban Guerrieri ( Olympiacos CFP)

== Standings after the round ==
| Pos | Team | Points |
|---|---|---|
| 1 | (England) Liverpool F.C. | 350 |
| 2 | (England) Tottenham Hotspur | 301 |
| 3 | (Greece) Olympiacos CFP | 259 |
| 4 | (Switzerland) FC Basel 1893 | 253 |
| 5 | (Brazil) SC Corinthians | 249 |
