= 2010 Assen Superleague Formula round =

2010 Assen Superleague Formula round Superleague Formula round Netherlands
- Circuit Map
- Date: May 16, 2010
- Location: TT Circuit Assen, Assen, Netherlands
- Course: Permanent racing facility 2.830 mi (4.554 km)
- Laps: 31 & 31
Pole position
Team	(Belgium) R.S.C. Anderlecht	Davide Rigon
- Time: 1:23.687
Podium (1st race)
First	(Belgium) R.S.C. Anderlecht	Davide Rigon
Second	(Brazil) CR Flamengo	Franck Perera
Third	(Switzerland) FC Basel 1893	Max Wissel
Fastest lap (1st race)
Team	(Italy) A.C. Milan	Yelmer Buurman
- Time: 1:23.547 (on lap 17)
Podium (2nd race)
First	(Greece) Olympiacos CFP	Chris van der Drift
Second	(England) Tottenham Hotspur	Craig Dolby
Third	(France) GD Bordeaux	Franck Montagny
Fastest lap (2nd race)
Team	(England) Tottenham Hotspur	Craig Dolby
- Time: 1:25.004 (on lap 18)

The 2010 Assen Superleague Formula round was a Superleague Formula round held on May 16, 2010, at the TT Circuit Assen, Assen, Netherlands. It was the first ever round at the Assen circuit and also the first ever one in the Netherlands. It was the second round of the 2010 Superleague Formula season.

Eighteen clubs took part, the seventeen who competed at the previous Silverstone round plus returning 2008 series champions Beijing Guoan. Dutch club PSV Eindhoven took part and it was initially thought that an FC Groningen car, to be driven by ex-F1 racer Jos Verstappen, would participate but the plan was abandoned 5 weeks before the event.

Support races included the Dutch Supercar Challenge and the International Superkart Series.

== Results ==
=== Qualifying ===
- In each group, the top four qualify for the quarter-finals.

==== Group A ====
Pos.	Team	Driver	Time
1	(Belgium) R.S.C. Anderlecht	(Italy) Davide Rigon	1:24.237
2	(France) GD Bordeaux	(France) Franck Montagny	1:24.328
3	(Brazil) CR Flamengo	(France) Franck Perera	1:24.529
4	(Turkey) Galatasaray S.K.	(France) Tristan Gommendy	1:24.579
5	(Spain) Sevilla FC	(Spain) Marcos Martínez	1:24.643
6	(France) Olympique Lyonnais	(France) Sébastien Bourdais	1:24.705
7	(England) Tottenham Hotspur	(United Kingdom) Craig Dolby	1:25.376
8	(Portugal) Sporting CP	(Spain) Borja García	1:25.881
9	(Spain) Atlético Madrid	(Spain) María de Villota	N/A

==== Group B ====
Pos.	Team	Driver	Time
1	(Italy) A.S. Roma	(France) Julien Jousse	1:23.947
2	(Greece) Olympiacos CFP	(New Zealand) Chris van der Drift	1:24.158
3	(Italy) A.C. Milan	(Netherlands) Yelmer Buurman	1:24.187
4	(Portugal) F.C. Porto	(Portugal) Álvaro Parente	1:24.277
5	(Switzerland) FC Basel	(Germany) Max Wissel	1:24.417
6	(England) Liverpool F.C.	(United Kingdom) James Walker	1:24.638
7	(China) Beijing Guoan	(Australia) John Martin	1:24.711
8	(Brazil) SC Corinthians	(Netherlands) Robert Doornbos	1:24.811
9	(Netherlands) PSV Eindhoven	(India) Narain Karthikeyan	1:25.739

==== Knockout stages ====
Quarter-Finals			Semi-Finals			Pole Shoot Out
A1	R.S.C. Anderlecht	1:24.263
B4	F.C. Porto	1:24.431	A1	R.S.C. Anderlecht	1:23.967
A3	CR Flamengo	1:24.183	A3	CR Flamengo	1:24.093
B2	Olympiacos CFP	1:24.384				A1	R.S.C. Anderlecht	1:23.687
A2	GD Bordeaux	1:24.035				A2	GD Bordeaux	1:24.244
B3	A.C. Milan	1:24.330	A2	GD Bordeaux	1:24.014
A4	Galatasaray S.K.	1:25.015	B1	A.S. Roma	1:24.212
B1	A.S. Roma	1:24.459

== Standings after the round ==
Pos	Team	Points
1	(England) Tottenham Hotspur	168
2	(Switzerland) FC Basel 1893	120
3	(Brazil) CR Flamengo	116
4	(Italy) A.C. Milan	114
5	(Belgium) R.S.C. Anderlecht	112
