= 2010 Magny-Cours Superleague Formula round =

2010 Magny-Cours Superleague Formula round Superleague Formula round France
- Circuit Map
- Date: May 23, 2010
- Location: Circuit de Nevers Magny-Cours, Magny-Cours, France
- Course: Permanent racing facility 2.740 mi (4.410 km)
- Laps: 31 & 29
Pole position
Team	(England) Tottenham Hotspur	Craig Dolby
- Time: 1:27.029
Podium (1st race)
First	(Italy) A.C. Milan	Yelmer Buurman
Second	(England) Tottenham Hotspur	Craig Dolby
Third	(Greece) Olympiacos CFP	Chris van der Drift
Fastest lap (1st race)
Team	(Italy) A.C. Milan	Yelmer Buurman
- Time: 1:26.722 (on lap 14)
Podium (2nd race)
First	(Switzerland) FC Basel 1893	Max Wissel
Second	(Italy) A.S. Roma	Julien Jousse
Third	(Belgium) R.S.C. Anderlecht	Davide Rigon
Fastest lap (2nd race)
Team	(Switzerland) FC Basel 1893	Max Wissel
- Time: 1:28.142 (on lap 17)

The 2010 Magny-Cours Superleague Formula round was a Superleague Formula round held on May 23, 2010, at the Circuit de Nevers Magny-Cours, Magny-Cours, France. It was the second round at the Magny-Cours circuit after it hosted its first Superleague Formula event in 2009. It was the third round of the 2010 Superleague Formula season.

Seventeen clubs entered the round including two French clubs, Olympique Lyonnais and GD Bordeaux. PSV Eindhoven missed the round due to driver Narain Karthikeyan's involvement in the NASCAR Camping World Truck Series race on the same weekend.

Support events included the British GT Championship.

== Results ==
=== Qualifying ===
- In each group, the top four qualify for the quarter-finals.

== Standings after the round ==
Pos	Team	Points
1	(England) Tottenham Hotspur	250
2	(Italy) A.C. Milan	196
3	(Belgium) R.S.C. Anderlecht	183
4	(Switzerland) FC Basel 1893	174
5	(Greece) Olympiacos CFP	151
