= Liverpool F.C. (Superleague Formula team) =

Motor racing team

Liverpool F.C. SF Racing Team
Founded	2008
Country	England
Driver(s)	Adrián Vallés ('08, '09); James Walker (2010); Frédéric Vervisch (2010)
First race	2008 Donington
Last race	2010 Navarra
Rounds	24
Ch'ships	1 (2009)
Total points	1176 (including Super Finals)
2010 position	10th (439 pts)
Races / Poles / Wins / Podiums / F. Laps; 48 / 2 / 5 / 9 / 4
NOTE - Data not including Super Finals

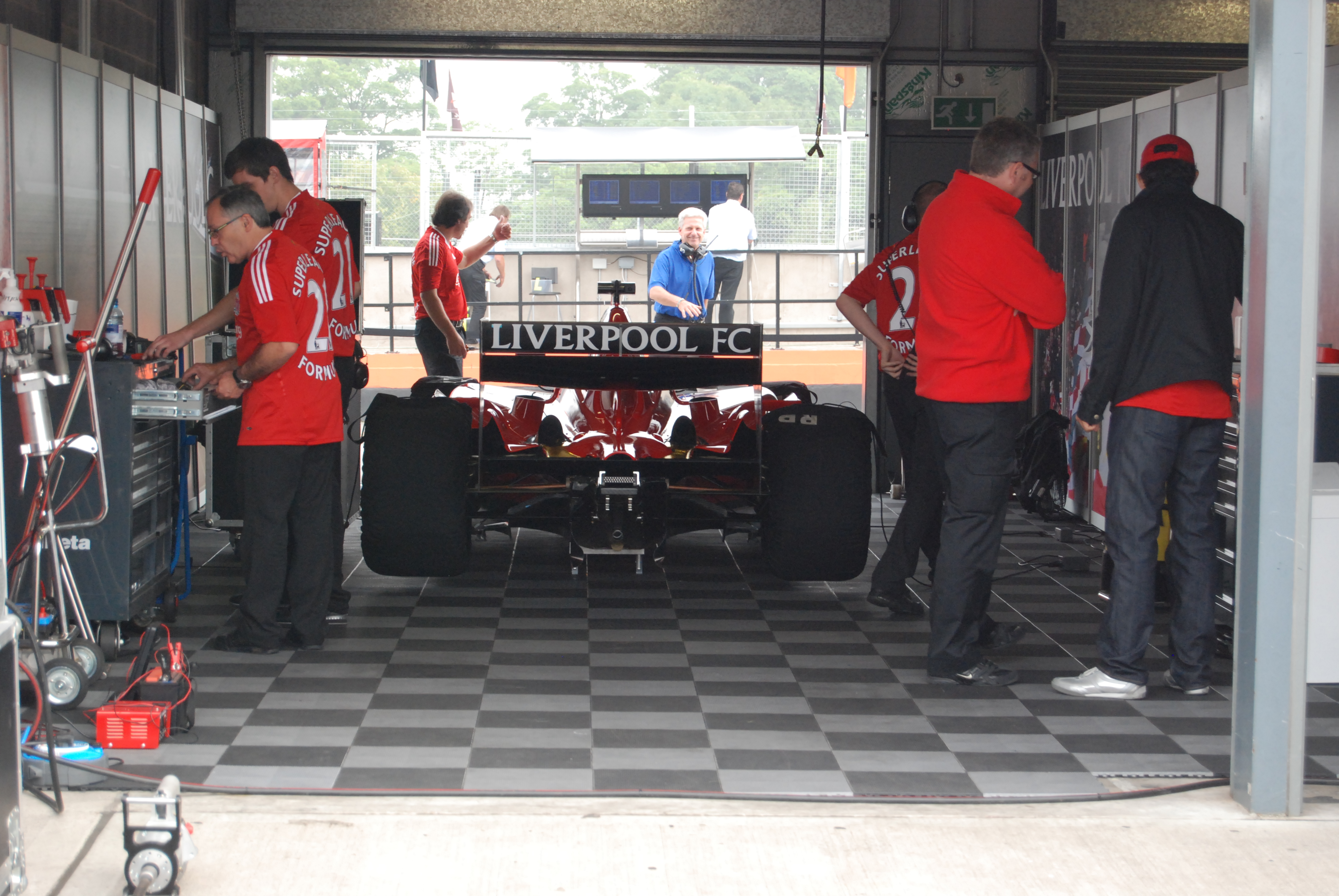
The Liverpool car in their pit garage during the 2008 Donington weekend.

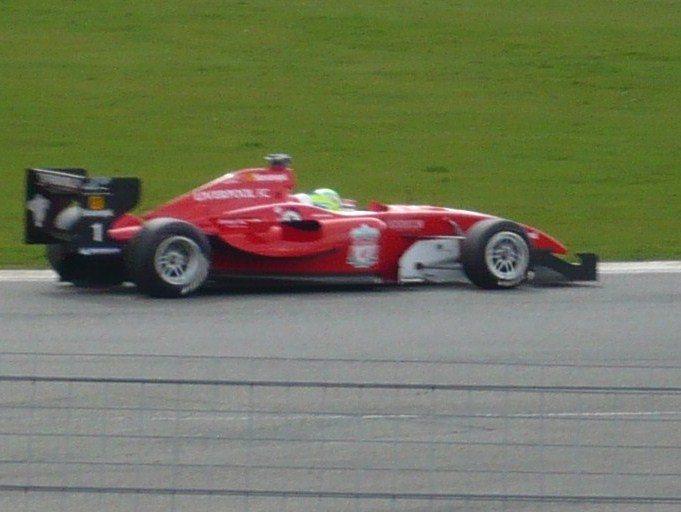
Liverpool F.C. car on track at Silverstone Circuit (2010)

Liverpool F.C. Superleague Formula team was the racing team of Liverpool F.C., a football team that competes in England in the Premier League. The Liverpool F.C. racing team competed in the Superleague Formula. They have been operated by Hitech Junior Team in all seasons, although the team changed name to Atech Grand Prix for 2010.

== 2008 season ==
In the 2008 Superleague Formula season Liverpool F.C. finished 4th overall in the table with 325 points. Spanish driver Adrián Vallés was the Liverpool driver for all rounds.

In the 2008 Zolder round, Liverpool F.C. won their first race, and also had the fastest lap in the first race.

Liverpool won their 2nd and last win of the 2008 season at the 2008 Estoril round.

Liverpool earned 2 pole positions at the Vallelunga round and the Jerez round.

== 2009 season ==
For the 2009 Superleague Formula season, Adrián Vallés was confirmed as the driver once again.

Liverpool won the opening round of the 2009 season at the Magny-Cours round, and they also won the Super Final.

Valles wrapped up the 2009 title with a solid fourth place for Liverpool in the final race of the season in Jarama.

== 2010 season ==
Liverpool F.C. will defend their crown in the 2010 season after the football club's director Ian Ayre confirmed they were contracted for several years. However, in 2011 they confirmed that they would not be competing in Superleague Formula in the short-term.

== Record ==
(key)

=== 2008 ===
Operator(s)	Driver(s)	1		2		3		4		5		6		Points	Rank
Operator(s)	Driver(s)	DON		NÜR		ZOL		EST		VAL		JER		Points	Rank
Hitech Junior Team	(Spain) Adrián Vallés	5	3	14	14	1	6	1	12	9	4	7	15	325	4th

=== 2009 ===
- Super Final results in 2009 did not count for points towards the main championship.

Operator(s)	Driver(s)	1			2			3			4			5			6			Points	Rank
Operator(s)	Driver(s)	MAG			ZOL			DON			EST			MOZ			JAR			Points	Rank
Hitech Junior Team	(Spain) Adrián Vallés	1	6	1	3	3	–	6	6	X	2	9	3	4	5	–	7	4	3	412	1st

=== 2010 ===
Operator(s)	Driver(s)	1			2			3			4			5			6			7			8			9			10			NC			11			Points	Rank
Operator(s)	Driver(s)	SIL			ASS			MAG			JAR			NÜR			ZOL			BRH			ADR			POR			ORD			BEI			NAV			Points	Rank
Atech GP/Reid Motorsport	(United Kingdom) James Walker	16	17	X	6	6	4	6	8	5	16	4	X	6	18	X	6	13	X	10	10	X																439	10th
Atech GP/Reid Motorsport	(Belgium) Frédéric Vervisch																						7	5	6	4	6	1	15	1	X	3	7	C	16	16	X	439	10th

Sporting positions
Preceded by Beijing Guoan (Davide Rigon)	Superleague Formula champion Liverpool F.C. (Adrián Vallés); 2009	Succeeded by R.S.C. Anderlecht (Davide Rigon)
