= FC Midtjylland (Superleague Formula team) =

Danish racing team

FC Midtjylland SF Racing Team
Founded	2009
Country	Denmark
Driver(s)	Kasper Andersen (2009)
First race	2009 Magny-Cours
Last race	2009 Jarama
Rounds	6
Ch'ships	0
Total points	203 (including Super Finals)
2010 position	n/a (n/a pts)
Races / Poles / Wins / Podiums / F. Laps; 12 / 1 / 0 / 1 / 0
NOTE - Data not including Super Finals

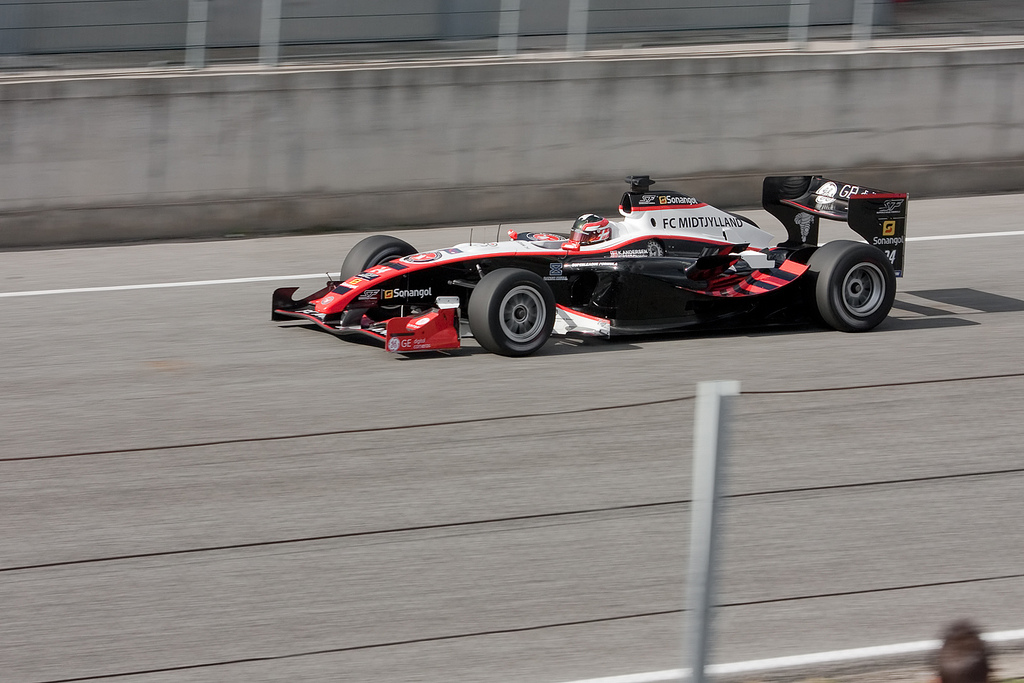
Kasper Andersen racing the FC Midtjylland entry during the 2009 Jarama weekend.

FC Midtjylland Superleague Formula team is the racing team of FC Midtjylland, a football team that competes in Denmark in the Danish Superliga. The FC Midtjylland racing team competes in the Superleague Formula.

== 2009 season ==
For the 2009 Superleague Formula season, Kasper Andersen has been confirmed as the driver and Hitech Junior Team as the operating team.

== Record ==
(key)

=== 2009 ===
- Super Final results in 2009 did not count for points towards the main championship.

Operator(s)	Driver(s)	1			2			3			4			5			6			Points	Rank
Operator(s)	Driver(s)	MAG			ZOL			DON			EST			MOZ			JAR			Points	Rank
Hitech Junior Team	(Denmark) Kasper Andersen	8	15	X	13	6	–	10	5	X	15	16	X	12	16	–	18	3	X	203	14th
