= 2009 Donington Park Superleague Formula round =

2009 Donington Park Superleague Formula round Superleague Formula round UK
- Circuit Map
- Date: 2 August, 2009
- Location: (United Kingdom) Donington Park, Leicestershire, England
- Course: Permanent racing facility 2.500 mi (4.023 km)
- Laps: 31 & 30
Pole position
Team	(Brazil) SC Corinthians	Antônio Pizzonia
- Time: 1:22.868
Podium (1st race)
First	(Switzerland) FC Basel 1893	Max Wissel
Second	(Scotland) Rangers F.C.	John Martin
Third	(Brazil) SC Corinthians	Antônio Pizzonia
Fastest lap (1st race)
Team	(Switzerland) FC Basel 1893	Max Wissel
- Time: 1:19.662 (on lap 16)
Podium (2nd race)
First	(Portugal) F.C. Porto	Tristan Gommendy
Second	(Portugal) Sporting CP	Pedro Petiz
Third	(Switzerland) FC Basel 1893	Max Wissel
Fastest lap (2nd race)
Team	(Brazil) SC Corinthians	Antônio Pizzonia
- Time: 1:19.400 (on lap 19)

The 2009 Donington Park Superleague Formula round was the third round of the 2009 Superleague Formula season, with the races taking place on 2 August 2009. Support race events included the Historic Formula One Championship, British Superkart and Formula Jedi.

== Report ==
=== Qualifying ===
Antônio Pizzonia took a fortunate second pole of the season, as qualifying was canned after the group stages due to heavy rain at Donington. As his lap time with much faster than the time of Davide Rigon, the quickest driver of Group B, he was given the benefit of pole position. Rigon will line up second, as all the Group B cars will fill that side of the grid.

== Results ==
=== Qualifying ===
- Due to adverse weather conditions, the knockout stages were cancelled. As Group A achieved faster times than Group B, the Group A cars lined up in the odd-numbered positions on the grid, with the Group B cars on the even-numbered positions.

==== Group A ====
Pos.	Team	Driver	Time
1	(Brazil) SC Corinthians	(Brazil) Antônio Pizzonia	1:22.868
2	(Switzerland) FC Basel 1893	(Germany) Max Wissel	1:22.907
3	(Scotland) Rangers F.C.	(Australia) John Martin	1:22.948
4	(Italy) A.S. Roma	(United Kingdom) Jonathan Kennard	1:22.953
5	(Spain) Sevilla FC	(Argentina) Esteban Guerrieri	1:23.036
6	(Brazil) Flamengo	(Brazil) Enrique Bernoldi	1:23.067
7	(Spain) Atlético Madrid	(China) Ho-Pin Tung	1:25.141
8	(Netherlands) PSV Eindhoven	(Netherlands) Dominick Muermans	1:26.199
9	(Turkey) Galatasaray SK	(United Kingdom) Scott Mansell	1:26.623

==== Group B ====
Pos.	Team	Driver	Time
1	(Greece) Olympiacos CFP	(Italy) Davide Rigon	1:32.414
2	(Italy) A.C. Milan	(Italy) Giorgio Pantano	1:33.110
3	(England) Tottenham Hotspur	(United Kingdom) Craig Dolby	1:33.660
4	(Belgium) RSC Anderlecht	(Netherlands) Yelmer Buurman	1:33.923
5	(England) Liverpool F.C.	(Spain) Adrián Vallés	1:34.551
6	(Portugal) F.C. Porto	(France) Tristan Gommendy	1:34.687
7	(France) Olympique Lyonnais	(France) Nelson Panciatici	1:34.727
8	(Denmark) FC Midtjylland	(Denmark) Kasper Andersen	1:35.095
9	(Portugal) Sporting CP	(Portugal) Pedro Petiz	1:36.933

==== Grid ====
Pos.	Team	Driver	Time
1	(Brazil) SC Corinthians	(Brazil) Antônio Pizzonia	1:22.868
2	(Greece) Olympiacos CFP	(Italy) Davide Rigon	1:32.414
3	(Switzerland) FC Basel 1893	(Germany) Max Wissel	1:22.907
4	(Italy) A.C. Milan	(Italy) Giorgio Pantano	1:33.110
5	(Scotland) Rangers F.C.	(Australia) John Martin	1:22.948
6	(England) Tottenham Hotspur	(United Kingdom) Craig Dolby	1:33.660
7	(Italy) A.S. Roma	(United Kingdom) Jonathan Kennard	1:22.953
8	(Belgium) RSC Anderlecht	(Netherlands) Yelmer Buurman	1:33.923
9	(Spain) Sevilla FC	(Argentina) Esteban Guerrieri	1:23.036
10	(England) Liverpool F.C.	(Spain) Adrián Vallés	1:34.551
11	(Brazil) Flamengo	(Brazil) Enrique Bernoldi	1:23.067
12	(Portugal) F.C. Porto	(France) Tristan Gommendy	1:34.687
13	(Spain) Atlético Madrid	(China) Ho-Pin Tung	1:25.141
14	(France) Olympique Lyonnais	(France) Nelson Panciatici	1:34.727
15	(Netherlands) PSV Eindhoven	(Netherlands) Dominick Muermans	1:26.199
16	(Denmark) FC Midtjylland	(Denmark) Kasper Andersen	1:35.095
17	(Turkey) Galatasaray SK	(United Kingdom) Scott Mansell	1:26.623
18	(Portugal) Sporting CP	(Portugal) Pedro Petiz	1:36.933

=== Race 1 ===
Pos	No	Team	Driver	Laps	Time/Retired	Grid	Pts.
1	10	(Switzerland) FC Basel 1893	(Germany) Max Wissel	31	45:15.840	3	50
2	17	(Scotland) Rangers F.C.	(Australia) John Martin	31	+ 2.180	5	45
3	14	(Brazil) SC Corinthians	(Brazil) Antônio Pizzonia	31	+ 3.121	1	40
4	3	(Italy) A.C. Milan	(Italy) Giorgio Pantano	31	+ 3.953	4	36
5	19	(England) Tottenham Hotspur	(United Kingdom) Craig Dolby	31	+ 11.490	6	32
6	21	(England) Liverpool F.C.	(Spain) Adrián Vallés	31	+ 12.582	10	29
7	22	(Italy) A.S. Roma	(United Kingdom) Jonathan Kennard	31	+ 16.415	7	26
8	16	(Portugal) F.C. Porto	(France) Tristan Gommendy	31	+ 16.853	12	23
9	15	(Spain) Atlético Madrid	(China) Ho-Pin Tung	31	+ 23.533	13	20
10	24	(Denmark) FC Midtjylland	(Denmark) Kasper Andersen	31	+ 24.487	16	18
11	18	(Spain) Sevilla FC	(Argentina) Esteban Guerrieri	31	+ 25.839	9	16
12	2	(Portugal) Sporting CP	(Portugal) Pedro Petiz	31	+ 1:05.223	18	14
13	4	(Turkey) Galatasaray S.K.	(United Kingdom) Scott Mansell	30	+ 1 Lap	17	12
14	69	(France) Olympique Lyonnais	(France) Nelson Panciatici	30	+ 1 Lap	14	10
15	5	(Netherlands) PSV Eindhoven	(Netherlands) Dominick Muermans	30	+ 1 Lap	15	8
16	8	(Belgium) R.S.C Anderlecht	(Netherlands) Yelmer Buurman	7	Gearbox	8	7
17	9	(Greece) Olympiacos CFP	(Italy) Davide Rigon	3	Oil Pressure	2	6
18	7	(Brazil) Flamengo	(Brazil) Enrique Bernoldi	0	Spin	11	5
Fastest lap: Max Wissel (FC Basel 1893) 1:19.662 (112.967 mph)

=== Race 2 ===
Pos	No	Team	Driver	Laps	Time/Retired	Grid	Pts.
1	16	(Portugal) F.C. Porto	(France) Tristan Gommendy				50
2	2	(Portugal) Sporting CP	(Portugal) Pedro Petiz				45
3	10	(Switzerland) FC Basel 1893	(Germany) Max Wissel				40
4	19	(England) Tottenham Hotspur	(United Kingdom) Craig Dolby				36
5	24	(Denmark) FC Midtjylland	(Denmark) Kasper Andersen				32
6	21	(England) Liverpool F.C.	(Spain) Adrián Vallés				29
7	15	(Spain) Atlético Madrid	(China) Ho-Pin Tung				26
8	14	(Brazil) SC Corinthians	(Brazil) Antônio Pizzonia				23
9	69	(France) Olympique Lyonnais	(France) Nelson Panciatici				20
10	22	(Italy) A.S. Roma	(United Kingdom) Jonathan Kennard				18
11	5	(Netherlands) PSV Eindhoven	(Netherlands) Dominick Muermans				16
12	4	(Turkey) Galatasaray S.K.	(United Kingdom) Scott Mansell				14
13	18	(Spain) Sevilla FC	(Argentina) Esteban Guerrieri				12
14	7	(Brazil) CR Flamengo	(Brazil) Enrique Bernoldi				10
15	9	(Greece) Olympiacos CFP	(Italy) Davide Rigon				8
16	17	(Scotland) Rangers F.C.	(Australia) John Martin				7
17	3	(Italy) A.C. Milan	(Italy) Giorgio Pantano				6
DNS	8	(Belgium) R.S.C Anderlecht	(Netherlands) Yelmer Buurman		Gearbox		0
Fastest lap: Antônio Pizzonia (SC Corinthians) ????

- Olympiacos CFP started from the pitlane.

=== Super Final ===
Pos	No	Team	Driver	Laps	Time/Retired	Grid
1	17	(Scotland) Rangers F.C.	(Australia) John Martin	5	6:43.077	3
2	19	(England) Tottenham Hotspur	(United Kingdom) Craig Dolby	5	+ 3.750	6
3	10	(Switzerland) FC Basel 1893	(Germany) Max Wissel	5	+ 6.210	1
4	14	(Brazil) SC Corinthians	(Brazil) Antônio Pizzonia	5	+ 7.843	5
5	16	(Portugal) F.C. Porto	(France) Tristan Gommendy	5	+ 10.009	2
6	2	(Portugal) Sporting CP	(Portugal) Pedro Petiz	5	+ 31.633	4
Fastest lap: Tristan Gommendy (F.C. Porto) 1:19.194 (113.635 mph)

== Standings after the round ==
Pos	Team	Points
1	(England) Liverpool F.C.	217
2	(Switzerland) FC Basel 1893	207
3	(England) Tottenham Hotspur	196
4	(Italy) A.C. Milan	154
5	(Portugal) F.C. Porto	146
