= Jonathan Kennard =

British racing driver

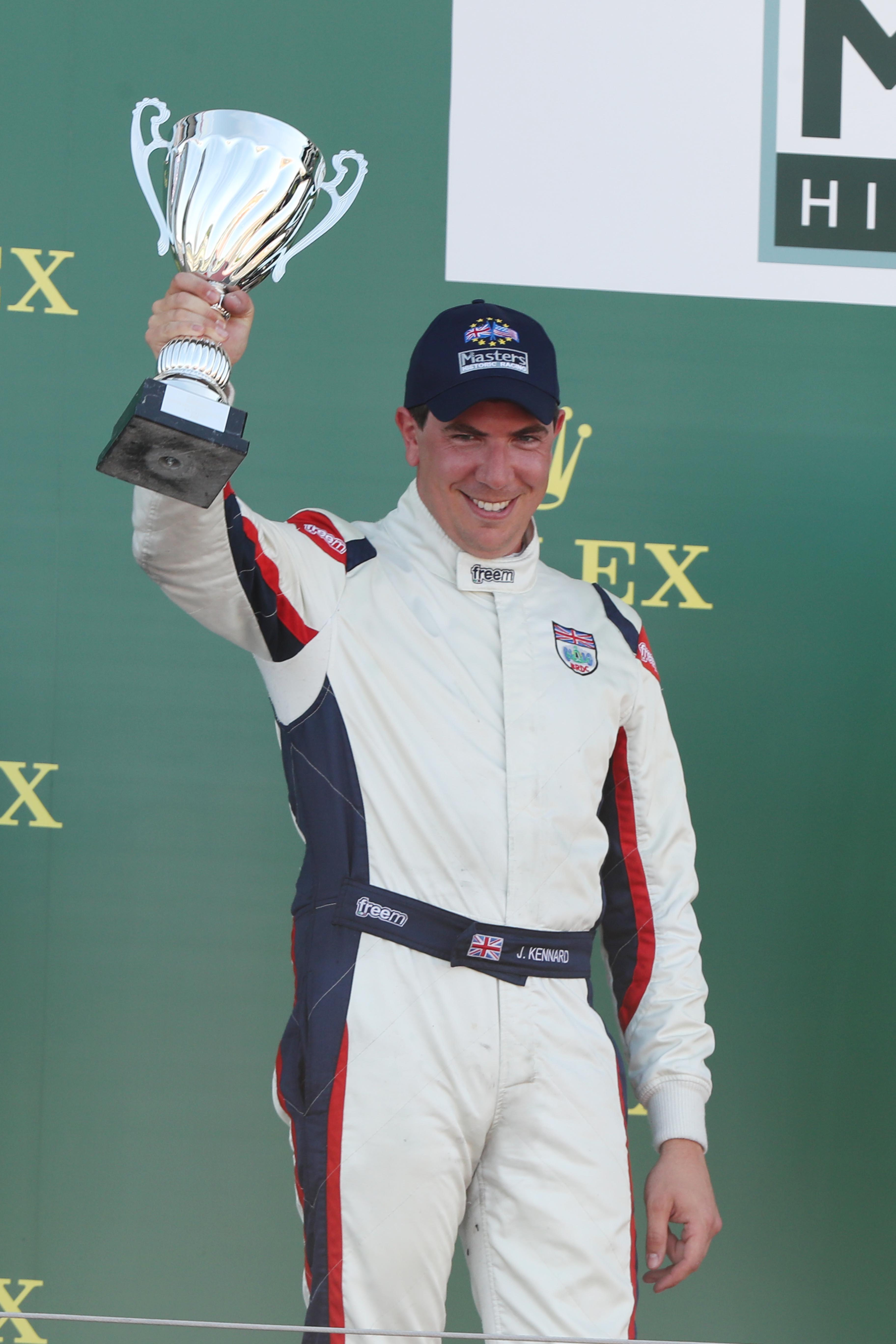
- Kennard on the Podium at the British Grand Prix in 2018
- Nationality: (United Kingdom) British
- Born: 26 June 1985 (age 41) Tunbridge Wells, England

FIA World Endurance Championship career
- Debut season: 2020
- Current team: IDEC Sport
- Categorisation: FIA Platinum (until 2012); FIA Gold (2013–2014); FIA Silver (2015–)
- Car number: 17
- Starts: 1
- Wins: 0
- Poles: 0
- Fastest laps: 0
- Best finish: 11th in LMP2 in 2020

Previous series
- 2020 2016-19 2017-18 2011 2010 2009 2005–07 2003–04 2003 2003 2002: FIA World Endurance Championship; Masters Historic Racing; Radical European Masters; FIA GT1 World Championship; European Le Mans Series; International Formula Master; British F3; Formula Palmer Audi; FR2.0 UK Winter Series; FPA Autumn Trophy; T Cars

Championship titles
- 2004 2003: Formula Palmer Audi; FPA Winter Trophy
24 Hours of Le Mans career
- Years: 2010 2020
- Teams: Kruse Schiller Motorsport (KSM), IDEC Sport
- Best finish: 26th, 15th
- Class wins: 0

Jonathan Kennard (born 26 June 1985 in Tunbridge Wells, England) is a British professional racing driver. He has won two series titles, Formula Palmer Audi in 2004 and the FPA Winter Trophy the previous year in 2003.

Kennard was also a test driver for the WilliamsF1 team in 2009.

Kennard is race winner in both the National class (2005) and Championship class (2007) of British Formula Three. He also ran at the Zolder F3 Masters in 2007 and the Macau Grand Prix in 2007.

In 2009, Kennard raced in the Superleague Formula for A.S. Roma in the 2009 season. He returned to the series driving for CR Flamengo at the Monza round of the series while Enrique Bernoldi was on FIA GT duty.

In 2010, Kennard raced in the Le Mans Series for the Kruse Schiller Motorsport Team in the LMP2 Class using a Lola Judd. He also finished the Le Mans 24hrs on his first attempt with the same team.

Kennard was the FIA Formula Two Test Driver from 2010 to 2012.

From 2016 to present, Kennard races in Historic Formula One and Endurance Racing Legends in Le Mans Prototypes. Most recently in 2019, he secured pole position for the Silverstone Classic in a Pescarolo LMP1 and dominated the race weekend taking two wins.

In 2020, Kennard raced in the Le Mans 24hrs in the LMP2 Class driving an Oreca 07 for IDEC Sport, finishing 11th in class and 15th overall.

== Motorsports Career results ==
=== Career summary ===
Season	Series	Team	Races	Wins	Poles	F/Laps	Podiums	Points	Position
2002	T Cars	?	?	?	?	?	?	?	6th
2003	Formula Renault 2.0 UK Winter Series	Manor Motorsport	?	?	?	?	?	0	NC
2003	Formula Palmer Audi Autumn Trophy	?	4	2	3	?	4	86	**1st**
2003	Formula Palmer Audi	?	12	1	1	?	4	139	6th
2004	Formula Palmer Audi	?	12	4	10	?	9	224	**1st**
2005	British F3 National Class	Alan Docking Racing	22	1	0	2	10	233	**3rd**
2006	British F3 Championship	Alan Docking Racing	22	0	0	0	0	36	12th
2006	Macau Grand Prix	Alan Docking Racing	1	0	0	0	0	N/A	16th
2007	British F3 Championship	Räikkönen Robertson Racing	22	1	2	3	5	130	6th
2007	Macau Grand Prix	Räikkönen Robertson Racing	1	0	0	0	0	N/A	NC
2007	Masters of Formula 3	Räikkönen Robertson Racing	1	0	0	0	0	N/A	20th
2008	Formula One	WilliamsF1	Test Driver						
2009	Superleague Formula	A.S. Roma	6	0	0	0	0	211†	13th†
2009	Superleague Formula	CR Flamengo	2	0	0	0	0	191†	16th†
2009	International Formula Master	Team JVA	2	0	0	0	0	4	14th
2010	Le Mans Series - LMP2	KSM Motorsport	3	0	0	0	0	17	13th
2010	24 Hours of Le Mans - LMP2	KSM	1	0	0	0	0	N/A	10th
2010	FIA Formula Two Championship	MotorSport Vision	Test Driver						
2011	FIA GT1 World Championship	DKR www.discount.de	6	0	0	0	0	0	N/A
2011	FIA Formula Two Championship	MotorSport Vision	Test Driver						
2012	FIA Formula Two Championship	MotorSport Vision	Test Driver						
2016	FIA Masters Historic Sportscar Championship	WDK	1	0	0	0	0	N/A	N/A
2017	Masters Historic F1	Scuderia Classiche	2	0	1	2	2	N/A	N/A
2017	Radical European Masters	Radical	3	3	1	3	3	N/A	N/A
2017	Spa Historic 6 Hrs	O C Racing	1	0	0	0	0	N/A	N/A
2017	Masters Endurance Legends	WDK	1	0	0	1	1	N/A	N/A
2018	Spa Historic 6 Hrs	O C Racing	1	0	0	0	1	N/A	N/A
2018	Radical European Masters	Radical	6	1	0	0	1	140	6th
2019	Masters Endurance Legends	CGA	2	2	1	0	2	18	5th
2019-20	FIA World Endurance Championship - LMP2	IDEC Sport	1	0	0	0	0	0	11th

† – Team standings.

=== Superleague Formula ===
(Races in bold indicate pole position) (Races in italics indicate fastest lap)

Year	Team	Operator	1		2		3		4	5		6	Position	Points
2009	A.S. Roma	Azerti Motorsport	MAG		ZOL		DON						13th	211
2009	A.S. Roma	Azerti Motorsport	15	14	11	5	7	10					13th	211
2009	CR Flamengo	Azerti Motorsport							EST	MOZ		JAR	16th	191
2009	CR Flamengo	Azerti Motorsport								17	18		16th	191

==== 2009 Super Final results ====
- Super Final results in 2009 did not count for points towards the main championship.

Year	Team	1	2	3	4	5	6
2009	**A.S. Roma**; **Azerti Motorsport**	MAG; DNQ	ZOL; N/A	DON; DNQ	EST	MOZ	JAR
2009	**CR Flamengo**; **Azerti Motorsport**	MAG	ZOL	DON	EST	MOZ; N/A	JAR

=== Complete 24 Hours of Le Mans results ===
Year	Team	Co-Drivers	Car	Class	Laps	Pos.	Class Pos.
2010	(Germany) Kruse Schiller Motorsport	(France) Jean de Pourtales (Japan) Hideki Noda	Lola B07/40-Judd	LMP2	291	26th	10th
2020	(France) IDEC Sport	(France) Patrick Pilet (United Kingdom) Kyle Tilley	Oreca 07-Gibson	LMP2	363	15th	11th

=== Complete GT1 World Championship results ===
Year	Team	Car	1	2	3	4	5	6	7	8	9	10	11	12	13	14	15	16	17	18	19	20	Pos	Points
2011	DKR www-discount.de	Lamborghini	ABU; QR	ABU; CR	ZOL; QR	ZOL; CR	ALG; QR	ALG; CR	SAC; QR	SAC; CR	SIL; QR	SIL; CR	NAV; QR	NAV; CR	PRI; QR	PRI; CR	ORD; QR; 14	ORD; CR; 13	BEI; QR; Ret	BEI; CR; Ret	SAN; QR; 13	SAN; CR; Ret	40th	0

Sporting positions
Preceded by Ryan Lewis	Formula Palmer Audi; Champion; 2004	Succeeded by Joe Tandy
