= 2009 Magny-Cours Superleague Formula round =

Opening round of the 2009 Superleague Formula season

2009 Magny-Cours Superleague Formula round Superleague Formula round France
- Circuit Map
- Date: 28 June, 2009
- Location: Circuit de Nevers Magny-Cours, Magny-Cours, France
- Course: Permanent racing facility 2.740 mi (4.410 km)
- Laps: 30 & 31
Pole position
Team	(Brazil) SC Corinthians	Antônio Pizzonia
- Time: 1:26.555
Podium (1st race)
First	(England) Liverpool	Adrian Valles
Second	(Belgium) R.S.C. Anderlecht	Yelmer Buurman
Third	(England) Tottenham Hotspur	Craig Dolby
Fastest lap (1st race)
Team	(England) Tottenham Hotspur	Craig Dolby
- Time: 1:27.284 (on lap 12)
Podium (2nd race)
First	(Italy) A.C. Milan	Giorgio Pantano
Second	(Greece) Olympiacos CFP	Davide Rigon
Third	(Switzerland) FC Basel 1893	Max Wissel
Fastest lap (2nd race)
Team	(Brazil) SC Corinthians	Antônio Pizzonia
- Time: 1:28.120 (on lap 12)

The 2009 Magny-Cours Superleague Formula round was the opening round of the 2009 Superleague Formula season, with the races taking place on 28 June 2009. Liverpool F.C. and A.C. Milan shared the two race wins, with Liverpool also being the Weekend Winner after winning the six-car Super Final. The supporting events were the Euroseries 3000 and the Mitjet Series.

== Report ==
=== Qualifying ===
As always, the field was split into two groups for qualifying, with the fastest four qualifiers from each progressing into the knockout stages to decide places 1 to 8 on the grid. Davide Rigon and Max Wissel driving the cars of Olympiacos and FC Basel 1893 both recorded times faster than Group A fourth place, Enrique Bernoldi (CR Flamengo). In the knockout stages, an all-British battle was the highlight of round one, with Rangers' John Martin and Tottenham's Craig Dolby recording the two fastest times of the first round. However, it was Melton Mowbray's Dolby who was faster, by three tenths of a second. Dolby's run ended at the semi-final stage, after spinning during his lap.

Antônio Pizzonia of SC Corinthians put paid to his hope, and would face Adrián Vallés in the Liverpool machine in the final. Pizzonia would come out on top by 0.299 seconds, to take his team's first pole position in Superleague Formula. Post-qualifying, the car of debutants FC Midtjylland, driven by Kasper Andersen was sent to the back of the grid, for failing to complete a round one lap due to a blistered tyre.

=== Race 1 ===
Pizzonia led away from the start, leading Vallés and Dolby before the safety car came out. Last year's champion driver Rigon attempted an over-optimistic passing move on F.C. Porto's Tristan Gommendy. The Italian ran into the back of the R.S.C. Anderlecht car of Yelmer Buurman, the drivers runner-up of last season, and spun at the Adelaide Hairpin. Gommendy and Martin also spun, while other cars had to drive through the gravel trap on the outside of the corner to avoid the hubbub on track. Once the race got under away again, Pizzonia started to pull away from his two chasers, although Vallés started to re-catch the ex-Formula One driver, and by lap five had passed him in a similar move to his pass on Dolby on lap one.

Dolby then closed to the back of Pizzonia, before the Brazilian pitted at the end of lap nine. A sloppy stop cost him dearly, as Dolby, Buurman and reigning GP2 Series champion Giorgio Pantano, who was making his debut in the series, in the car of A.C. Milan. Vallés made his pit stop on lap five, and came out eight seconds to the good from Buurman, which he then extended to twelve seconds at one point. He did however back off towards the conclusion of the 45-minute race, and won by 6.5 seconds to give Liverpool their third win in Superleague Formula, tying the mark of Beijing Guoan for most wins. Buurman finished second, for Anderlecht's fourth second-place finish without success and Dolby finished third. Pantano had been all set to finish fourth, however a late spin saw him fall to twelfth. Pizzonia finished fourth ahead of Duncan Tappy (Galatasaray S.K.), Bernoldi, debutant Pedro Petiz (Sporting CP), Andersen, Miguel Molina (Al Ain) and Wissel rounded out the top ten. Gommendy, Martin and Rigon all retired, along with another debutant Jonathan Kennard in the car of A.S. Roma.

=== Race 2 ===
In the reverse grid race, Rigon started from pole position after his first lap antics in race one. However, he was jumped at the start by the fast-starting Martin, with Kennard in third ahead of Pantano. The Italian would take Kennard on lap three, to move into third place. Further back, Dolby (who started 16th after his race one podium) was charging his way through the field, having passed six cars to make the top ten, in as many laps. Pantano closed in on both Martin and Rigon, with Rigon blinking first for the mandatory pit stop. Pantano followed Martin, who pitted on lap nine, but that turned into a calamity for the Australian.

Pantano gained the advantage after the pit stops, with an advantage of some five seconds over his fellow Italian Rigon. However, the current GP2 racer closed in on Pantano, getting the gap down to as low as 1.9 seconds, before making a crucial error at the Adelaide Hairpin. Pantano thus won the race in only his second race, by 2.2 seconds from Rigon. After Martin's crashing out, Wissel came to clinch third and a spot in the Super Final. Molina was fourth, ahead of Buurman (up from 17th), Vallés (up from 18th), Gommendy, Bernoldi, Pizzonia and Dolby (who lost drive on the final lap). Joining Martin on the retirements list were Kennard, Andersen, Petiz and Dominick Muermans (PSV Eindhoven).

=== Super Final ===
New for 2009, the "Super Final" race decides who will pick up a bonus of €100,000 and the title of "Weekend Winner". The top three cars from each race qualify for the event. Originally, the qualifiers were Liverpool, Anderlecht, Spurs, Milan, Olympiacos and Basel, but Spurs failed to take the start due to their sixth gear problem at the end of the second race. Therefore, Corinthians took their place on the six-car grid, for the eight-lap race.

Vallés took the lead from pole position, leading from Pantano, Buurman, Rigon, Pizzonia and Wissel. Pizzonia made the first attack, with a move on Rigon at Adelaide on lap one. He succeeded with the move, and set off after Buurman, passing him at the start of lap two. The Dutchman slipstreamed back to the Brazilian and tried to make a move on the Corinthians car, but failed to make it. Rigon had trouble at the start of lap three, dropping to last behind Wissel. Vallés continued his speed at the front, and unsurprisingly won the race, beating Pantano by close to five seconds. Pizzonia finished third, ahead of Buurman, Wissel and Rigon.

== Results ==
=== Qualifying ===
- In each group, the top four qualify for the quarter-finals.

==== Group A ====
Pos.	Team	Driver	Time
1	(England) Liverpool F.C.	(Spain) Adrián Vallés	1:26.493
2	(England) Tottenham Hotspur	(United Kingdom) Craig Dolby	1:26.628
3	(Belgium) R.S.C. Anderlecht	(Netherlands) Yelmer Buurman	1:27.085
4	(Brazil) CR Flamengo	(Brazil) Enrique Bernoldi	1:27.285
5	(Spain) Atlético Madrid	(China) Ho-Pin Tung	1:27.574
6	(Portugal) Sporting CP	(Portugal) Pedro Petiz	1:27.686
7	(United Arab Emirates) Al Ain	(Spain) Miguel Molina	1:27.909
8	(France) Olympique Lyonnais	(France) Nelson Panciatici	1:28.129
9	(Italy) A.S. Roma	(United Kingdom) Jonathan Kennard	1:28.968

==== Group B ====
Pos.	Team	Driver	Time
1	(Brazil) SC Corinthians	(Brazil) Antônio Pizzonia	1:26.391
2	(Portugal) F.C. Porto	(France) Tristan Gommendy	1:26.588
3	(Scotland) Rangers F.C.	(Australia) John Martin	1:26.674
4	(Denmark) FC Midtjylland	(Denmark) Kasper Andersen	1:27.158
5	(Greece) Olympiacos CFP	(Italy) Davide Rigon	1:27.191
6	(Switzerland) FC Basel 1893	(Germany) Max Wissel	1:27.223
7	(Turkey) Galatasaray S.K.	(United Kingdom) Duncan Tappy	1:27.386
8	(Netherlands) PSV Eindhoven	(Netherlands) Dominick Muermans	1:30.051
9	(Italy) A.C. Milan	(Italy) Giorgio Pantano	No time

==== Knockout stages ====
Quarter-Finals			Semi-Finals			Pole Shoot Out
B1	SC Corinthians	1:27.129
A4	CR Flamengo	1:28.909	B1	SC Corinthians	1:27.896
B3	Rangers F.C.	1:26.982	A2	Tottenham Hotspur	1:47.696
A2	Tottenham Hotspur	1:26.670				B1	SC Corinthians	1:26.555
B2	F.C. Porto	No time				A1	Liverpool F.C.	1:26.854
A3	R.S.C. Anderlecht	1:36.913	A3	R.S.C. Anderlecht	1:27.275
B4	FC Midtjylland	No time	A1	Liverpool F.C.	1:26.421
A1	Liverpool F.C.	1:36.417

==== Grid ====
Pos.	Team	Driver	Time
1	(Brazil) SC Corinthians	(Brazil) Antônio Pizzonia	1:26.555
2	(England) Liverpool F.C.	(Spain) Adrián Vallés	1:26.854
3	(Belgium) R.S.C. Anderlecht	(Netherlands) Yelmer Buurman	1:27.275
4	(England) Tottenham Hotspur	(United Kingdom) Craig Dolby	1:47.696
5	(Scotland) Rangers F.C.	(Australia) John Martin	1:26.982
6	(Portugal) F.C. Porto	(France) Tristan Gommendy	No time
7	(Brazil) CR Flamengo	(Brazil) Enrique Bernoldi	1:28.909
8	(Greece) Olympiacos CFP	(Italy) Davide Rigon	1:27.191
9	(Spain) Atlético Madrid	(China) Ho-Pin Tung	1:27.574
10	(Switzerland) FC Basel 1893	(Germany) Max Wissel	1:27.223
11	(Portugal) Sporting CP	(Portugal) Pedro Petiz	1:27.686
12	(Turkey) Galatasaray S.K.	(United Kingdom) Duncan Tappy	1:27.386
13	(United Arab Emirates) Al Ain	(Spain) Miguel Molina	1:27.909
14	(Netherlands) PSV Eindhoven	(Netherlands) Dominick Muermans	1:30.051
15	(France) Olympique Lyonnais	(France) Nelson Panciatici	1:28.129
16	(Italy) A.C. Milan	(Italy) Giorgio Pantano	No time
17	(Denmark) FC Midtjylland	(Denmark) Kasper Andersen	1:27.158*
18	(Italy) A.S. Roma	(United Kingdom) Jonathan Kennard	1:28.968

- * Andersen sent to the back row of the grid, following his failure to complete a lap in the first round. He started 17th as he recorded a faster lap time than Kennard.

=== Race 1 ===
Pos	No	Team	Driver	Laps	Time/Retired	Grid	Pts.
1	21	(England) Liverpool F.C.	(Spain) Adrián Vallés	30	45:57.400	2	50
2	8	(Belgium) R.S.C. Anderlecht	(Netherlands) Yelmer Buurman	30	+ 6.298	3	45
3	19	(England) Tottenham Hotspur	(United Kingdom) Craig Dolby	30	+ 7.237	4	40
4	14	(Brazil) SC Corinthians	(Brazil) Antônio Pizzonia	30	+ 16.968	1	36
5	4	(Turkey) Galatasaray S.K.	(United Kingdom) Duncan Tappy	30	+ 27.801	12	32
6	7	(Brazil) CR Flamengo	(Brazil) Enrique Bernoldi	30	+ 37.807	7	29
7	2	(Portugal) Sporting CP	(Portugal) Pedro Petiz	30	+ 44.178	11	26
8	24	(Denmark) FC Midtjylland	(Denmark) Kasper Andersen	30	+ 55.903	17	23
9	6	(United Arab Emirates) Al Ain	(Spain) Miguel Molina	30	+ 1:03.281	13	20
10	10	(Switzerland) FC Basel 1893	(Germany) Max Wissel	30	+ 1:03.907	10	18
11	5	(Netherlands) PSV Eindhoven	(Netherlands) Dominick Muermans	30	+ 1:26.555	14	16
12	3	(Italy) A.C. Milan	(Italy) Giorgio Pantano	29	Spin	16	14
13	69	(France) Olympique Lyonnais	(France) Nelson Panciatici	29	+ 1 Lap	15	12
14	15	(Spain) Atlético Madrid	(China) Ho-Pin Tung	29	+ 1 Lap	9	10
15	22	(Italy) A.S. Roma	(United Kingdom) Jonathan Kennard	17	Brakes	18	8
16	16	(Portugal) F.C. Porto	(France) Tristan Gommendy	8	+ 22 Laps	6	7
17	17	(Scotland) Rangers F.C.	(Australia) John Martin	1	Acc. Damage	5	6
18	9	(Greece) Olympiacos CFP	(Italy) Davide Rigon	0	Accident	8	5
Fastest lap: Craig Dolby (Tottenham Hotspur) 1:27.284 (113.046 mph)

=== Race 2 ===
Pos	No	Team	Driver	Laps	Time/Retired	Grid	Pts.
1	3	(Italy) A.C. Milan	(Italy) Giorgio Pantano	31	46:57.511	7	50
2	9	(Greece) Olympiacos CFP	(Italy) Davide Rigon	31	+ 2.273	1	45
3	10	(Switzerland) FC Basel 1893	(Germany) Max Wissel	31	+ 11.372	9	40
4	6	(United Arab Emirates) Al Ain	(Spain) Miguel Molina	31	+ 15.455	10	36
5	8	(Belgium) R.S.C. Anderlecht	(Netherlands) Yelmer Buurman	31	+ 17.987	17	32
6	21	(England) Liverpool F.C.	(Spain) Adrián Vallés	31	+ 18.811	18	29
7	16	(Portugal) F.C. Porto	(France) Tristan Gommendy	31	+ 19.759	3	26
8	7	(Brazil) CR Flamengo	(Brazil) Enrique Bernoldi	31	+ 21.740	13	23
9	14	(Brazil) SC Corinthians	(Brazil) Antônio Pizzonia	31	+ 21.998	15	20
10	19	(England) Tottenham Hotspur	(United Kingdom) Craig Dolby	31	+ 23.594	16	18
11	4	(Turkey) Galatasaray S.K.	(United Kingdom) Duncan Tappy	31	+ 31.831	13	16
12	15	(Spain) Atlético Madrid	(China) Ho-Pin Tung	31	+ 1:08.911	5	14
13	69	(France) Olympique Lyonnais	(France) Nelson Panciatici	31	+ 1:26.911	6	12
14	22	(Italy) A.S. Roma	(United Kingdom) Jonathan Kennard	28	Clutch	4	10
15	24	(Denmark) FC Midtjylland	(Denmark) Kasper Andersen	17	Mechanical	11	8
16	17	(Scotland) Rangers F.C.	(Australia) John Martin	16	Accident	2	7
17	2	(Portugal) Sporting CP	(Portugal) Pedro Petiz	6	Accident	12	6
18	5	(Netherlands) PSV Eindhoven	(Netherlands) Dominick Muermans	0	Accident	8	5
Fastest lap: Antônio Pizzonia (SC Corinthians) 1:28.120 (111.974 mph)

=== Super Final ===
Pos	No	Team	Driver	Laps	Time/Retired	Grid
1	21	(England) Liverpool F.C.	(Spain) Adrián Vallés	8	11:49.172	1
2	3	(Italy) A.C. Milan	(Italy) Giorgio Pantano	8	+ 4.813	2
3	14	(Brazil) SC Corinthians*	(Brazil) Antônio Pizzonia	8	+ 6.774	5
4	8	(Belgium) R.S.C. Anderlecht	(Netherlands) Yelmer Buurman	8	+ 9.402	3
5	10	(Switzerland) FC Basel 1893	(Germany) Max Wissel	8	+ 24.385	6
6	9	(Greece) Olympiacos CFP	(Italy) Davide Rigon	8	+ 26.246	4
Fastest lap: Adrián Vallés (Liverpool F.C.) 1:28.245 (111.815 mph)

- * Corinthians lined up in the super final, as Tottenham could not start due to their problems in race two.

== Standings after the round ==
Pos	Team	Points
1	(England) Liverpool F.C.	79
2	(Belgium) R.S.C. Anderlecht	77
3	(Italy) A.C. Milan	64
4	(England) Tottenham Hotspur	58
5	(Switzerland) FC Basel 1893	58
