= PSV Eindhoven (Superleague Formula team) =

Motor racing team

PSV Eindhoven SF Racing Team
Founded	2008
Country	Netherlands
Driver(s)	Yelmer Buurman (2008); Dominick Muermans (2009); Carlo van Dam (2009); Narain Karthikeyan (2010); Hywel Lloyd (2010); Adderly Fong (2010); Earl Bamber (2010); Esteban Guerrieri (2010)
First race	2008 Donington
Last race	2010 Navarra
Rounds	23
Ch'ships	0
Total points	770 (including Super Finals)
2010 position	16th (288 pts)
Races / Poles / Wins / Podiums / F. Laps; 46 / 0 / 2 / 6 / 2
NOTE - Data not including Super Finals

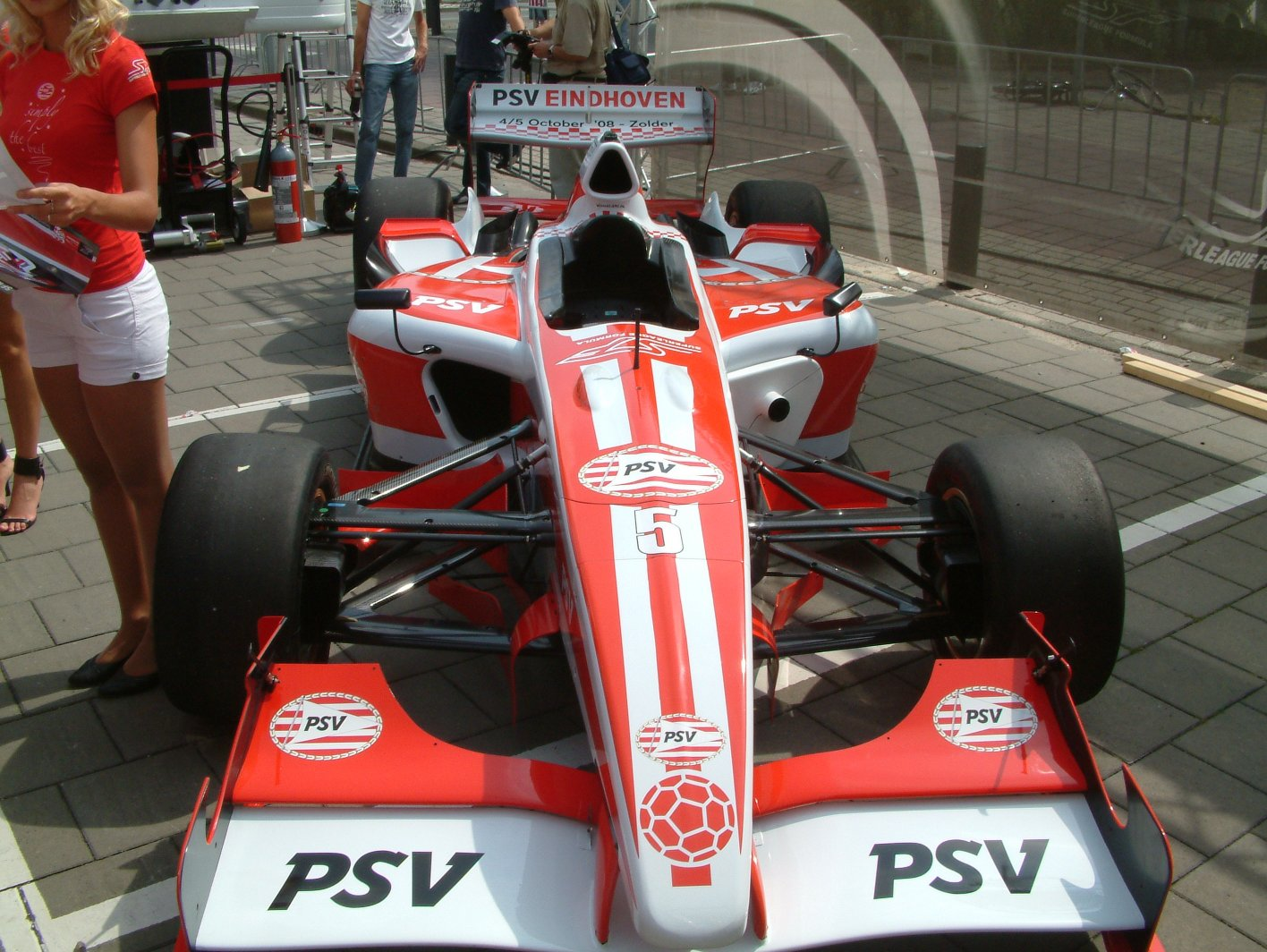
The PSV car is unveiled (2008)

PSV Eindhoven Superleague Formula team was the racing team of PSV Eindhoven, a football team that competes in the Netherlands in the Eredivisie. The PSV Eindhoven racing team competed in the Superleague Formula. It had been operated by Azerti Motorsport for all seasons.

== 2008 season ==
In the 2008 Superleague Formula season PSV Eindhoven finished overall in 2nd place in the standings. They were 76 points behind eventual series winners Beijing Guoan. Yelmer Buurman was the driver in the car for all the races.

== 2009 season ==
For the 2009 Superleague Formula season, Dominick Muermans was confirmed as the driver.

== Record ==
(key)

=== 2008 ===
Operator(s)	Driver(s)	1		2		3		4		5		6		Points	Rank
Operator(s)	Driver(s)	DON		NÜR		ZOL		EST		VAL		JER		Points	Rank
Azerti Motorsport	(Netherlands) Yelmer Buurman	4	8	10	1	7	3	9	8	10	3	8	9	337	2nd

=== 2009 ===
- Super Final results in 2009 did not count for points towards the main championship.

Operator(s)	Driver(s)	1			2			3			4			5			6			Points	Rank
Operator(s)	Driver(s)	MAG			ZOL			DON			EST			MOZ			JAR			Points	Rank
Azerti Motorsport	(Netherlands) Dominick Muermans	11	18	X	15	17	–	15	11	X										145	18th
Azerti Motorsport	(Netherlands) Carlo van Dam										10	10	X	16	8	–	12	17	X	145	18th

=== 2010 ===
Operator(s)	Driver(s)	1			2			3	4			5			6			7			8			9			10			NC			11			Points	Rank
Operator(s)	Driver(s)	SIL			ASS			MAG	JAR			NÜR			ZOL			BRH			ADR			POR			ORD			BEI			NAV			Points	Rank
Racing for Holland	(India) Narain Karthikeyan	12	15	X	13	9	X		11	15	X	13	16	X																						288	16th
Atech GP/Reid Motorsport	(India) Narain Karthikeyan														10	14	X	18	1	X																288	16th
Atech GP/Reid Motorsport	(United Kingdom) Hywel Lloyd																				12	12	X	16	8	X										288	16th
Atech GP/Reid Motorsport	(China) Adderly Fong																										10	11	X							288	16th
Atech GP/Reid Motorsport	(New Zealand) Earl Bamber																													6	2	C				288	16th
Atech GP/Reid Motorsport	(Argentina) Esteban Guerrieri																																11	2	3	288	16th
