= 2010 Adria Superleague Formula round =

2010 Adria Superleague Formula round Superleague Formula round Italy
- Circuit Map
- Date: September 5, 2010
- Location: Adria International Raceway, Adria, Italy
- Course: Permanent racing facility 1.679 mi (2.702 km)
- Laps: 40 & 40
Pole position
Team	(Belgium) R.S.C. Anderlecht	Davide Rigon
- Time: 1:06.644
Podium (1st race)
First	(Belgium) R.S.C. Anderlecht	Davide Rigon
Second	(China) Beijing Guoan	John Martin
Third	(Greece) Olympiacos CFP	Ben Hanley
Fastest lap (1st race)
Team	(Switzerland) FC Basel 1893	Max Wissel
- Time: 1:06.580 (on lap 17)
Podium (2nd race)
First	(Spain) Sevilla FC	Marcos Martínez
Second	(England) Tottenham Hotspur	Craig Dolby
Third	(Brazil) CR Flamengo	Duncan Tappy
Fastest lap (2nd race)
Team	(Brazil) SC Corinthians	Robert Doornbos
- Time: 1:06.944 (on lap 19)

The 2010 Adria Superleague Formula round was a Superleague Formula round held on September 5, 2010, at the Adria International Raceway circuit, Adria, Italy. It was Superleague Formula's first visit to the circuit after visits in previous years to Italy's Vallelunga and Monza circuits. It was the eighth round of the 2010 Superleague Formula season.

Only sixteen clubs took part, a record low for the series, including Italian clubs A.C. Milan and A.S. Roma. Sporting CP and GD Bordeaux cited "technical problems" as reasons for not competing.

Support races included PL Auto and Formula 2000 Light.

== Report ==
María de Villota did not compete in qualifying or the races having aggravating an old neck injury during the second free practice session. "It was in my hands", she said, "it was just so painful". María joined the regulars in the commentary box on SF's live feed for the Sunday races. That left only fifteen cars to compete, SF's smallest ever grid.

== Results ==
=== Qualifying ===
- In each group, the top four qualify for the quarter-finals.

== Standings after the round ==
Pos	Team	Points
1	(England) Tottenham Hotspur	518
2	(Italy) A.C. Milan	515
3	(Belgium) R.S.C. Anderlecht	506
4	(Switzerland) FC Basel 1893	472
5	(Greece) Olympiacos CFP	468
