= Max Wissel =

German racing driver

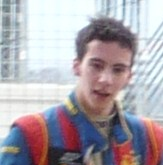
- Max Wissel in 2010
- Nationality: German
- Born: 24 November 1989 (age 36) Alzenau, Germany

Superleague Formula career
- Debut season: 2008
- Current team: FC Basel 1893
- Car number: 10
- Starts: 24
- Wins: 1
- Poles: 0
- Fastest laps: 3
- Best finish: 3rd in 2009 & 2010

Previous series
- 2008 2006–07: Formula Renault 2.0 NEC; Formula BMW ADAC

Maximilian "Max" Wissel (born 24 November 1989) is a German former racing driver.

Between 2008 and 2011, Wissel competed in the Superleague Formula, driving for the FC Basel 1893 and South Korean teams.

== Racing record ==
=== Career summary ===
Season	Series	Team name	Races	Wins	Poles	F/Laps	Podiums	Points	Position
2006	Formula BMW ADAC	GU-Racing Motorsport Team	18	0	0	0	1	45	11th
2006	Formula BMW World Final	GU-Racing Motorsport Team	1	0	0	0	0	N/A	21st
2007	Formula BMW ADAC	GU-Racing International	18	1	0	1	2	426	6th
2008	Superleague Formula	FC Basel 1893	12	0	0	0	0	205	15th
2008	Formula Renault 2.0 NEC	GU-Racing International	8	0	0	0	0	93	18th
2009	Superleague Formula	FC Basel 1893	14	1	0	3	4	308	**3rd**
2010	Superleague Formula	FC Basel 1893	31	1	1	3	7	667	**3rd**
2011	Superleague Formula	South Korea	3	0	0	0	1	71	11th

=== Complete Formula Renault 2.0 NEC results ===
(key) (Races in bold indicate pole position) (Races in italics indicate fastest lap)

Year	Entrant	1	2	3	4	5	6	7	8	9	10	11	12	13	14	15	16	DC	Points
2008	GU-Racing	HOC; 1; 8	HOC; 2 Ret	ZAN; 1; 6	ZAN; 2 Ret	ALA; 1; 6	ALA; 2; 5	OSC; 1; 4	OSC; 2; 4	ASS; 1	ASS; 2	ZOL; 1	ZOL; 2	NÜR; 1	NÜR; 2	SPA; 1	SPA; 2	18th	93

=== Superleague Formula ===
(Races in bold indicate pole position) (Races in italics indicate fastest lap)

Superleague Formula results
Year	Team	Operator	1			2			3			4			5			6			7			8			9			10			11			Pos.	Pts
2008	FC Basel 1893	GU-Racing International	DON			NÜR			ZOL			EST			VLL			JER																		15th	205
2008	FC Basel 1893	GU-Racing International	9	7		9	13		4	5		18	**14**		12	15		11	17																	15th	205
2009	FC Basel 1893	GU-Racing International	MAG			ZOL			DON			EST			MNZ			JAR																		**3rd**	**308**
2009	FC Basel 1893	GU-Racing International	10	3	5†	4	8		1	3	3†	DNS	11	X	9	14		5	8	X																**3rd**	**308**
2010	FC Basel 1893	GU-Racing International	SIL			ASN			MAG			JAR			NÜR			ZOL			BRH			ADR			ALG			ORD			NAV			**3rd**	**667**
2010	FC Basel 1893	GU-Racing International	**5**	6	2	3	13	5	17	**1**	3	4	7	4	8	5	4	7	4	6	6	11	X	4	7	2	7	4	4	2	2	**6**	6	14	X	**3rd**	**667**
2011	South Korea	Emilio de Villota Motorsport	ASN			ZOL																														11th	71
2011	South Korea	Emilio de Villota Motorsport				8	2	4																												11th	71

†Super Final results in 2009 did not count for points towards the main championship.
