= Pedro Petiz =

Portuguese racing driver

- Nationality: (Portugal) Portuguese
- Born: 29 October 1986 (age 40) Porto (Portugal)
- Relatives: Tiago Petiz (brother)

Superleague Formula career
- Debut season: 2009
- Current team: Sporting CP
- Car number: 2
- Starts: 2
- Wins: 1
- Poles: 0
- Fastest laps: 0
- Best finish: 1

Previous series
- 2008 2005–07 2004 2004: Porsche Supercup; Renault Eurocup; Formula Baviera; Vodafone Cup by SEAT Sprint

Championship titles
- 2007: Renault Eurocup

Pedro Petiz (born 29 October 1986) is a Portuguese racing driver. He was the 2007 champion of the Renault Eurocup. He last competed in the Superleague Formula, where he raced for Sporting CP in the 2009 season.

== Motorsports career results ==
=== Superleague Formula ===
Year	Team	1	2	3	4	5	6	7	8	9	10	11	12	Rank	Pts.
2009	Sporting CP; Zakspeed	MAG; 7	MAG; 17	ZOL; 16	ZOL; 13	DON; 12	DON; 2	EST; 9	EST; 17	MOZ; 18	MOZ; 1	JAR; 13	JAR; 13	12th	215

==== Super Final Results ====
Year	Team	1	2	3	4	5	6
2009	Sporting CP; Zakspeed	MAG; DNQ	ZOL; N/A	DON; 6	EST; DNQ	MOZ; N/A	JAR; DNQ

Sporting positions
Preceded by Jaap van Lagen	Eurocup Mégane Trophy Champion; 2007	Succeeded by Michaël Rossi
