= Beijing Guoan (Superleague Formula team) =

Beijing Guoan SF Racing Team
Founded	2008
Country	China
Driver(s)	Davide Rigon (2008); John Martin (2010)
First race	2008 Donington
Last race	2010 Navarra
Rounds	17
Ch'ships	1 (2008)
Total points	866 (including Super Finals)
2010 position	9th (453 pts)
Races / Poles / Wins / Podiums / F. Laps; 33 / 3 / 7 / 10 / 3
NOTE - Data not including Super Finals

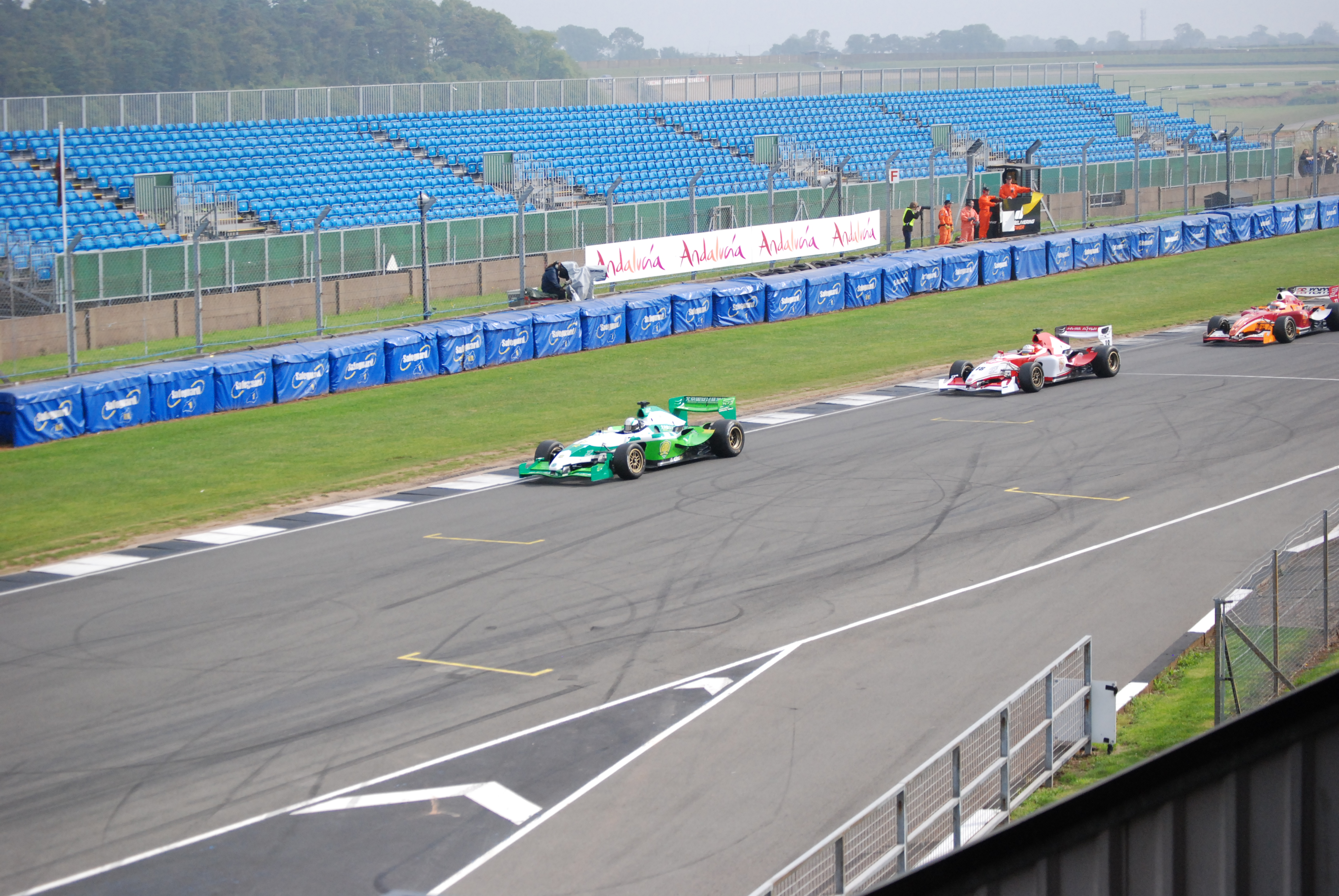
Davide Rigon leading cars during the 2008 Donington weekend.

Beijing Guoan Superleague Formula team is the racing team of Beijing Guoan, a football team that competes in China in the Chinese Super League. The Beijing Guoan racing team competes in the Superleague Formula. They are operated by Alan Docking Racing. They would not return until 2010.

== 2008 season ==
In the 2008 Superleague Formula season Beijing Guoan were declared the champions after finishing 1st overall with 413 points. Italian driver Davide Rigon was the Beijing driver for all rounds.

In the 2008 Donington Park round Beijing secured pole for the first race, and went on to set the fastest lap in the first race and win it.

Beijing Guoan's only retirement was at the 2008 Zolder round in race 1 where they collided with A.C. Milan (Robert Doornbos) at the first corner. Thanks to the reverse grid format, they won the 2nd race at Zolder. Their last race win was the first race of the 2008 Vallelunga round where they also set the fastest lap.

== 2010 ==
In May 2010 it was announced that Beijing would return to Superleague. They had missed the opening round at Silverstone. John Martin was the driver. At Jarama the team took the first pole and won the first race. The team would score five more race wins during the season and finishing ninth in the final standings.

== Record ==
(key)

=== 2008 ===
Operator(s)	Driver(s)	1		2		3		4		5		6		Points	Rank
Operator(s)	Driver(s)	DON		NÜR		ZOL		EST		VAL		JER		Points	Rank
Zakspeed	(Italy) Davide Rigon	1	6	5	3	17	1	5	5	1	5	9	3	413	1st

=== 2010 ===
Operator(s)	Driver(s)	1	2			3			4			5			6			7			8			9			10			NC			11			Points	Rank
Operator(s)	Driver(s)	SIL	ASS			MAG			JAR			NÜR			ZOL			BRH			ADR			POR			ORD			BEI			NAV			Points	Rank
Alan Docking Racing	(Australia) John Martin		10	17	X	4	10	X	1	9	2	18	15	X	13	7	X	1	16	1	2	9	4	1	11	3	19	DN	X	11	6	C	1	6	1	453	9th

Sporting positions
Preceded by New Championship	Superleague Formula champion Beijing Guoan (Davide Rigon); 2008	Succeeded by Liverpool F.C. (Adrián Vallés)
