= 2010 Navarra Superleague Formula round =

2010 Navarra Superleague Formula round Superleague Formula round Spain
- Circuit Map
- Date: October 24, 2010
- Location: Circuito de Navarra, Los Arcos, Spain
- Course: Permanent racing facility 2.444 mi (3.933 km)
- Laps: 26 & 22
Pole position
Team	(Belgium) R.S.C. Anderlecht	Davide Rigon
- Time: 1:26.702
Podium (1st race)
First	(China) Beijing Guoan	John Martin
Second	(Belgium) R.S.C. Anderlecht	Davide Rigon
Third	(England) Tottenham Hotspur	Craig Dolby
Fastest lap (1st race)
Team	(England) Liverpool F.C.	Frédéric Vervisch
- Time: 1:27.348 (on lap 13)
Podium (2nd race)
First	(Portugal) F.C. Porto	Álvaro Parente
Second	(Netherlands) PSV Eindhoven	Esteban Guerrieri
Third	(Spain) Sevilla FC	Marcos Martínez
Fastest lap (2nd race)
Team	(Portugal) F.C. Porto	Álvaro Parente
- Time: 1:28.302 (on lap 15)

The 2010 Navarra Superleague Formula round was a Superleague Formula round held on October 24, 2010, at the Circuito de Navarra circuit, Los Arcos, Spain. It was Superleague Formula's first visit to the newly built circuit and the second round of the 2010 season to be held in Spain, after the Jarama round. It was the eleventh and final round championship (the twelfth overall) of the 2010 Superleague Formula season.

Eighteen clubs took part including Spanish clubs Atlético Madrid and Sevilla FC.

Support races came from the equally prestigious FIA GT1 World Championship.

== Results ==
=== Qualifying ===
- In each group, the top four qualify for the quarter-finals.

== Standings after the round ==
Pos	Team	Points
1	(Belgium) R.S.C. Anderlecht	699
2	(England) Tottenham Hotspur	697
3	(Switzerland) FC Basel 1893	667
4	(Greece) Olympiacos CFP	653
5	(Italy) A.C. Milan	631
