= R.S.C. Anderlecht (Superleague Formula team) =

R.S.C. Anderlecht SF Racing Team
| Founded | 2008 |
| Country | Belgium |
| Driver(s) | Craig Dolby (2008); Yelmer Buurman (2009); Davide Rigon (2010) |
| First race | 2008 Donington |
| Last race | 2010 Navarra |
| Rounds | 24 |
| Ch'ships | 1 (2010) |
| Total points | 1307 (including Super Finals) |
| 2010 position | 1st (699 pts) |
Races / Poles / Wins / Podiums / F. Laps; 47 / 3 / 3 / 13 / 4
NOTE - Data not including Super Finals

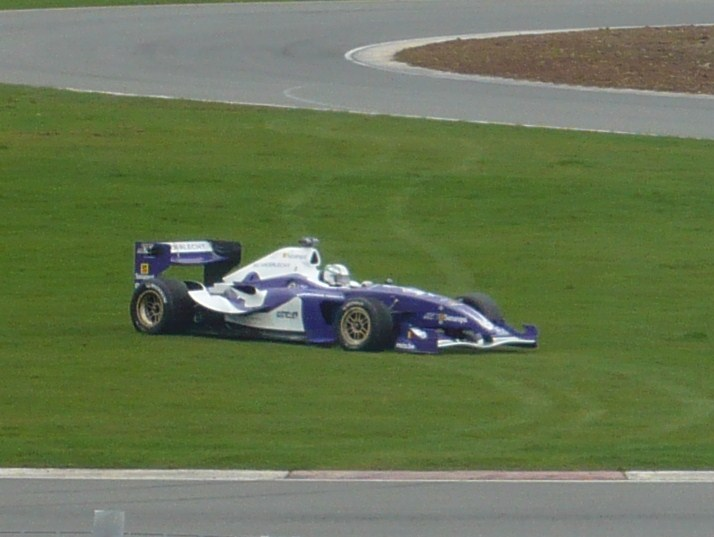
R.S.C. Anderlecht car off the track at Silverstone Circuit (2010)

R.S.C. Anderlecht Superleague Formula team was the racing team of R.S.C. Anderlecht, a football team that competes in Belgium in the Belgian First Division. The R.S.C. Anderlecht racing team competed in the Superleague Formula. It was operated in 2008 by Team Astromega, by former Formula One team Zakspeed during the 2009 season and by Azerti Motorsport during the 2010 and 2011 seasons.

== 2008 season ==
In the 2008 Superleague Formula season R.S.C. Anderlecht finished overall in 6th place in the standings. Craig Dolby was the driver in the car for all the races. The team's best finish was 2nd which they posted 3 times.

== 2009 season ==
R.S.C. Anderlecht competed with Yelmer Buurman as driver, who finished 2nd for PSV Eindhoven in the previous season. Craig Dolby did not return as he was confirmed as the driver of Tottenham Hotspur Zakspeed operated the team.

== Record ==
(key)

=== 2008 ===
| Operator(s) | Driver(s) | 1 | | 2 | | 3 | | 4 | | 5 | | 6 | | Points | Rank |
| Operator(s) | Driver(s) | DON | | NÜR | | ZOL | | EST | | VAL | | JER | | Points | Rank |
|---|---|---|---|---|---|---|---|---|---|---|---|---|---|---|---|
| Team Astromega | (United Kingdom) Craig Dolby | 14 | 16 | 2 | 2 | 2 | 16 | 14 | 9 | 7 | 6 | 4 | 8 | 303 | 6th |

=== 2009 ===
- Super Final results in 2009 did not count for points towards the main championship.

| Operator(s) | Driver(s) | 1 | | | 2 | | | 3 | | | 4 | | | 5 | | | 6 | | | Points | Rank |
| Operator(s) | Driver(s) | MAG | | | ZOL | | | DON | | | EST | | | MOZ | | | JAR | | | Points | Rank |
|---|---|---|---|---|---|---|---|---|---|---|---|---|---|---|---|---|---|---|---|---|---|
| Zakspeed | (Netherlands) Yelmer Buurman | 2 | 5 | 4 | 8 | 14 | – | 16 | DN | X | 4 | 4 | 4 | 6 | 6 | – | 1 | 15 | 1 | 305 | 4th |

=== 2010 ===
| Operator(s) | Driver(s) | 1 | | | 2 | | | 3 | | | 4 | | | 5 | | | 6 | | | 7 | | | 8 | | | 9 | | | 10 | | | NC | | | 11 | | | Points | Rank |
| Operator(s) | Driver(s) | SIL | | | ASS | | | MAG | | | JAR | | | NÜR | | | ZOL | | | BRH | | | ADR | | | POR | | | ORD | | | BEI | | | NAV | | | Points | Rank |
|---|---|---|---|---|---|---|---|---|---|---|---|---|---|---|---|---|---|---|---|---|---|---|---|---|---|---|---|---|---|---|---|---|---|---|---|---|---|---|---|
| Azerti Motorsport | (Italy) Davide Rigon | 9 | 10 | X | 1 | 10 | 1 | 7 | 3 | 2 | 10 | 6 | X | 2 | 12 | 2 | 2 | 9 | 1 | 13 | 2 | 2 | 1 | 8 | 1 | 2 | 9 | 2 | 5 | 8 | 3 | 13 | 15 | C | 2 | 11 | 4 | 699 | 1st |

Sporting positions
| Preceded by Liverpool F.C. (Adrián Vallés) | Superleague Formula champion R.S.C. Anderlecht (Davide Rigon); 2010 | Succeeded by Australia (John Martin) |
