= Dominick Muermans =

Dutch racing driver (born 1984)

- Nationality: (Netherlands) Dutch
- Born: 17 July 1984 (age 42) Geleen, Netherlands

Superleague Formula career
- Debut season: 2008
- Current team: PSV Eindhoven
- Car number: 5
- Former teams: Al Ain
- Starts: 4
- Wins: 0
- Poles: 0
- Fastest laps: 0
- Best finish: 12th in 2008

Previous series
- 2007 2007 2006–08 2006–07 2006 2005 2005 2005: International Formula Master; British Formula Three Championship; Atlantic Championship; German Formula Three Championship; Formula Three Euroseries; Formula Renault 2.0 Germany; Formula Renault 2.0 Netherlands; Formula Renault 2.0 Nordic

Dominick Muermans (born 17 July 1984 in Geleen, Netherlands) is a Dutch former racing driver.

Muermans raced full-time in the Atlantic Championship in the 2008 season.

In 2008, Muermans raced in the Superleague Formula, in the 2008 season, he raced for Al Ain in the Italian round and in the 2009 season, he was driver for PSV Eindhoven in the first half of the season before being replaced by Carlo van Dam.

Muermans has not raced professionally since 2009.

== Racing record ==
=== Career summary ===
Season	Series	Team	Races	Wins	Poles	F/Laps	Podiums	Points	Position
2005	Formula Renault 2.0 Nordic Series	Van Amersfoort Racing	2	0	0	0	0	0	NC
2005	Formula Renault 2.0 Netherlands	Van Amersfoort Racing	12	0	0	0	0	49	11th
2005	Formula Renault 2.0 Germany	Van Amersfoort Racing	12	0	0	0	0	53	21st
2006	Recaro Formel 3 Cup	Van Amersfoort Racing	16	0	0	0	0	3	21st
2006	Formula Three Euroseries	Van Amersfoort Racing	2	0	0	0	0	N/A	NC
2006	Masters of Formula 3	Van Amersfoort Racing	1	0	0	0	0	N/A	32nd
2007	International Formula Master	Ombra Racing	16	0	0	0	0	1	28th
2007	ATS Formel 3 Cup	Swiss Racing Team	9	0	0	0	0	12	10th
2007	British Formula Three	Swiss Racing Team	2	0	0	0	0	0	NC
2007	Champ Car Atlantics	Jensen MotorSport	2	0	0	0	0	5	28th
2007	SCCA Southeast Formula Atlantic	?	2	0	0	0	1	8	11th
2008	Atlantic Championship	Condor Motorsports	11	0	0	0	0	80	14th
2008	Superleague Formula	Al Ain	2	0	0	0	0	244†	12th†
2009	Superleague Formula	PSV Eindhoven	6	0	0	0	0	145 †	18th †

† - Team standings.

=== Superleague Formula ===
==== 2008-2009 ====
(Races in bold indicate pole position) (Races in italics indicate fastest lap)

Year	Team	Operator	1		2		3		4	5		6	Position	Points
2008	Al Ain	Azerti Motorsport	DON		NÜR		ZOL		EST	VAL		JER	**12th**	**244**
2008	Al Ain	Azerti Motorsport								14	8		**12th**	**244**
2009	PSV Eindhoven	Azerti Motorsport	MAG		ZOL		DON		EST	MOZ		JAR	18th	145
2009	PSV Eindhoven	Azerti Motorsport	11	18	15	17	15	11					18th	145

==== 2009 Super Final Results ====
- Super Final results in 2009 did not count for points towards the main championship.

Year	Team	1	2	3	4	5	6
2009	**PSV Eindhoven**; **Azerti Motorsport**	MAG; DNQ	ZOL; N/A	DON; DNQ	EST	MOZ	JAR
