= Sevilla FC (Superleague Formula team) =

Sevilla FC SF Racing Team
| Founded | 2008 |
| Country | Spain |
| Driver(s) | Borja García (2008); Esteban Guerrieri (2009); Sébastien Bourdais (2009); Marcos Martínez (2010) |
| First race | 2008 Donington |
| Last race | 2010 Navarra |
| Rounds | 22 |
| Ch'ships | 0 |
| Total points | 870 (including Super Finals) |
| 2010 position | 14th (355 pts) |
Races / Poles / Wins / Podiums / F. Laps; 44 / 2 / 3 / 7 / 0
NOTE - Data not including Super Finals

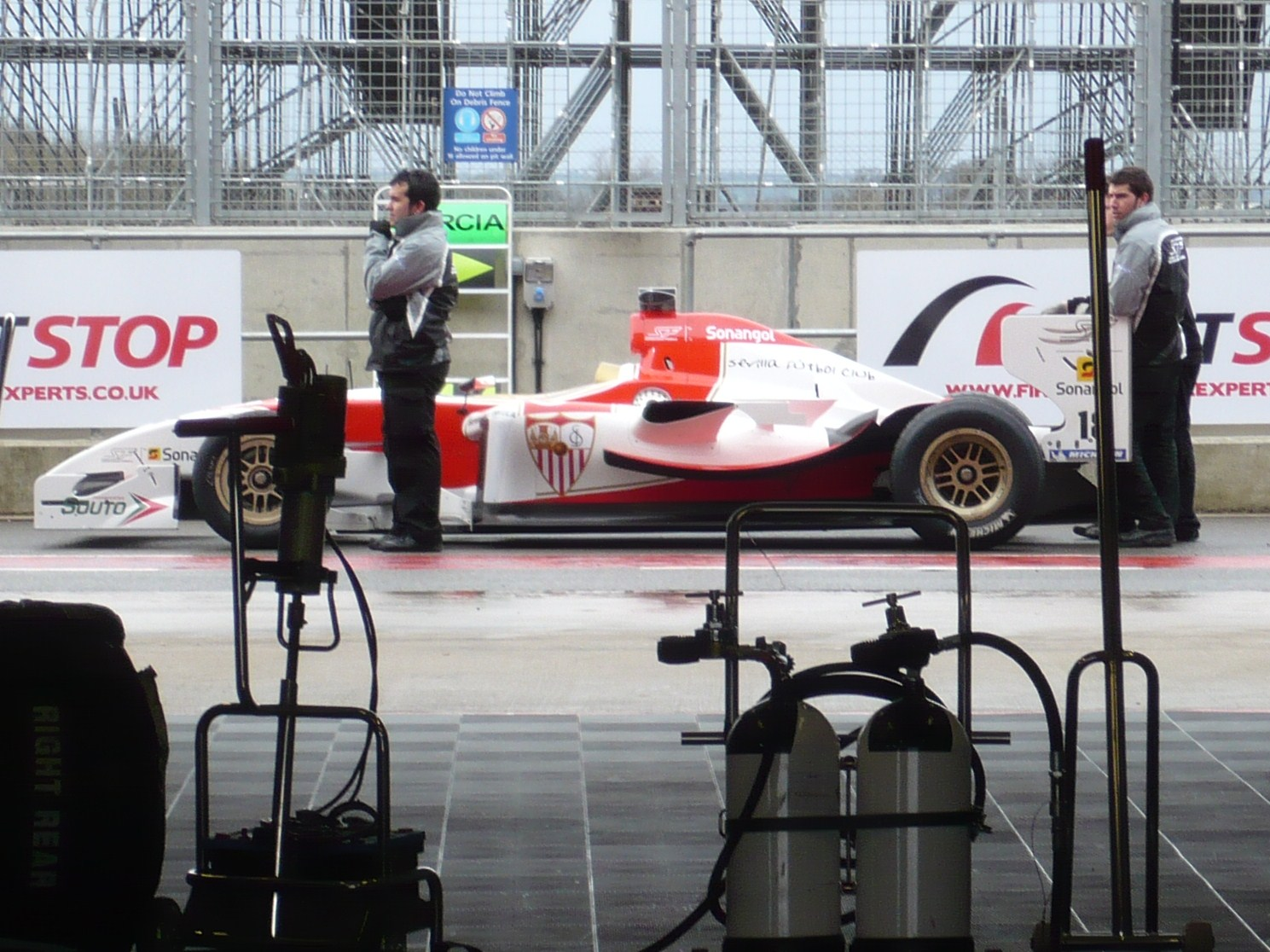
Sevilla's car in the pitlane at the 2010 Silverstone Superleague Formula round

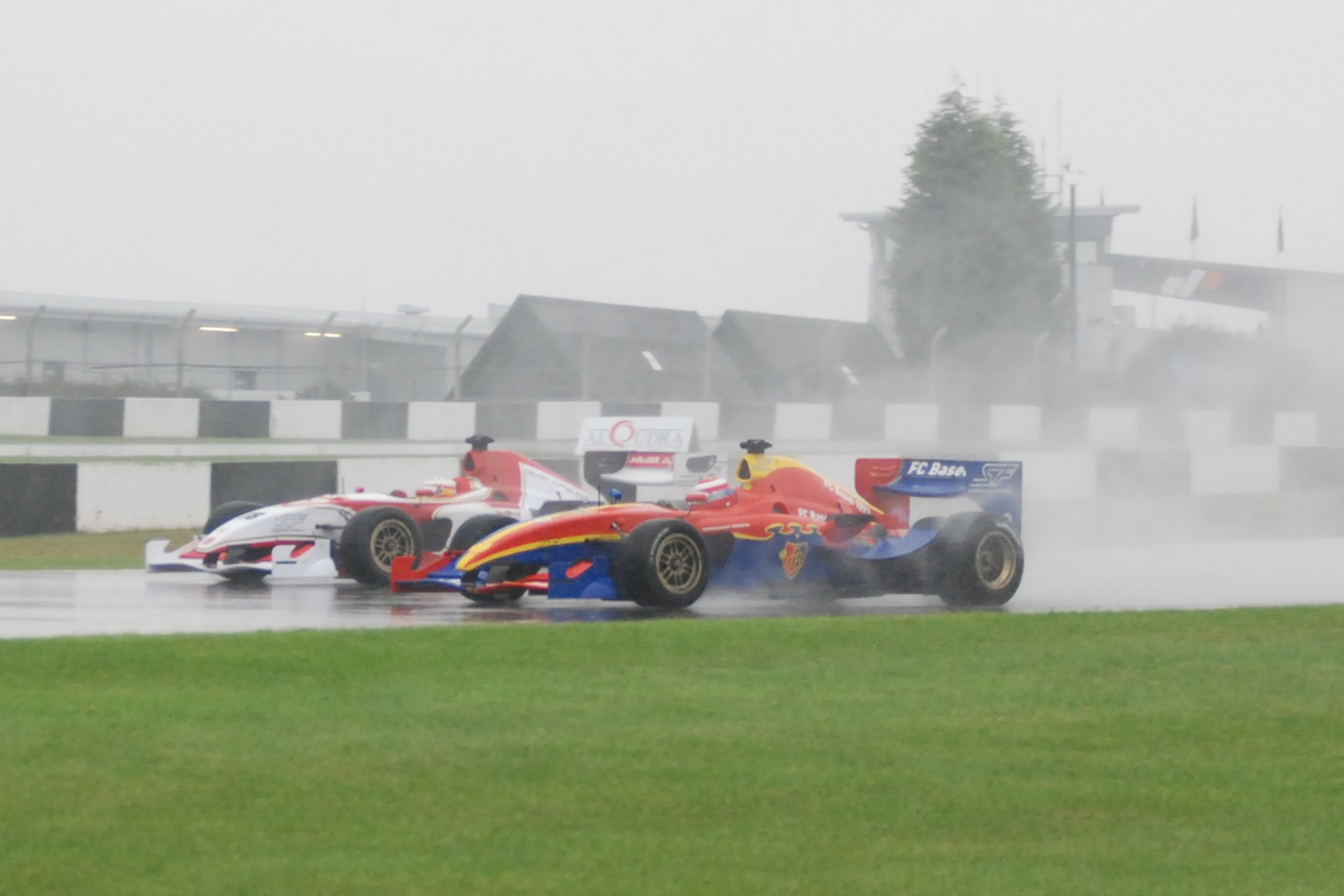
Borja García fighting on-track with Max Wissel of FC Basel 1893 in the second 2008 Donington Park race

Sevilla FC Superleague Formula team was the racing team of Sevilla FC, a football team that competes in Spain in La Liga. The Sevilla FC racing team competed in the Superleague Formula. They were operated by GTA Motor Competición.

== 2008 season ==
In the 2008 Superleague Formula season Sevilla FC finished 10th overall in the table with 262 points. Spanish driver Borja García was the Sevilla driver for all rounds.

Sevilla won the 2nd race of the opening 2008 Donington Park round.

== 2009 season ==
They did not return for the first 2 rounds of the 2009 season. However, they replaced Al Ain from round 3 of the championship.

Sébastien Bourdais joined the team for round 4 for the rest of the season. He was the weekend winner of round 4 and round 5.

== Record ==
(key)

=== 2008 ===
| Operator(s) | Driver(s) | 1 | | 2 | | 3 | | 4 | | 5 | | 6 | | Points | Rank |
| Operator(s) | Driver(s) | DON | | NÜR | | ZOL | | EST | | VAL | | JER | | Points | Rank |
|---|---|---|---|---|---|---|---|---|---|---|---|---|---|---|---|
| GTA Motor Competición | (Spain) Borja García | 10 | 1 | 6 | 8 | 16 | 8 | 8 | 7 | 17 | 13 | 6 | 11 | 262 | 10th |

=== 2009 ===
- Super Final results in 2009 did not count for points towards the main championship.

| Operator(s) | Driver(s) | 1 | 2 | 3 | | | 4 | | | 5 | | | 6 | | | Points | Rank |
| Operator(s) | Driver(s) | MAG | ZOL | DON | | | EST | | | MOZ | | | JAR | | | Points | Rank |
|---|---|---|---|---|---|---|---|---|---|---|---|---|---|---|---|---|---|
| Ultimate Motorsport | (Argentina) Esteban Guerrieri | | | 11 | 13 | X | | | | | | | | | | 253 | 9th |
| Ultimate Motorsport | (France) Sébastien Bourdais | | | | | | 11 | 2 | 1 | 1 | 3 | – | 2 | 6 | 2 | 253 | 9th |

=== 2010 ===
| Operator(s) | Driver(s) | 1 | | | 2 | | | 3 | | | 4 | | | 5 | | | 6 | | | 7 | | | 8 | | | 9 | | | 10 | | | NC | | | 11 | | | Points | Rank |
| Operator(s) | Driver(s) | SIL | | | ASS | | | MAG | | | JAR | | | NÜR | | | ZOL | | | BRH | | | ADR | | | POR | | | ORD | | | BEI | | | NAV | | | Points | Rank |
|---|---|---|---|---|---|---|---|---|---|---|---|---|---|---|---|---|---|---|---|---|---|---|---|---|---|---|---|---|---|---|---|---|---|---|---|---|---|---|---|
| EmiliodeVillota Motorsport | (Spain) Marcos Martínez | 6 | 9 | X | 12 | 4 | X | 16 | 17 | X | 15 | 16 | X | 11 | 13 | X | 8 | 15 | X | 16 | 8 | X | 14 | 1 | 5 | 12 | 18 | X | 8 | 9 | X | 16 | 4 | C | 15 | 3 | X | 355 | 14th |
