= CR Flamengo (Superleague Formula team) =

CR Flamengo SF Racing Team
Founded	2008
Country	Brazil
Driver(s)	Tuka Rocha (2008); Enrique Bernoldi (2009); Jonathan Kennard (2009); Duncan Tappy (2010); Franck Perera (2010); Andy Soucek (2010)
First race	2008 Donington
Last race	2010 Navarra
Rounds	24
Ch'ships	0
Total points	920 (including Super Finals)
2010 position	6th (540 pts)
Races / Poles / Wins / Podiums / F. Laps; 46 / 0 / 0 / 8 / 1
NOTE - Data not including Super Finals

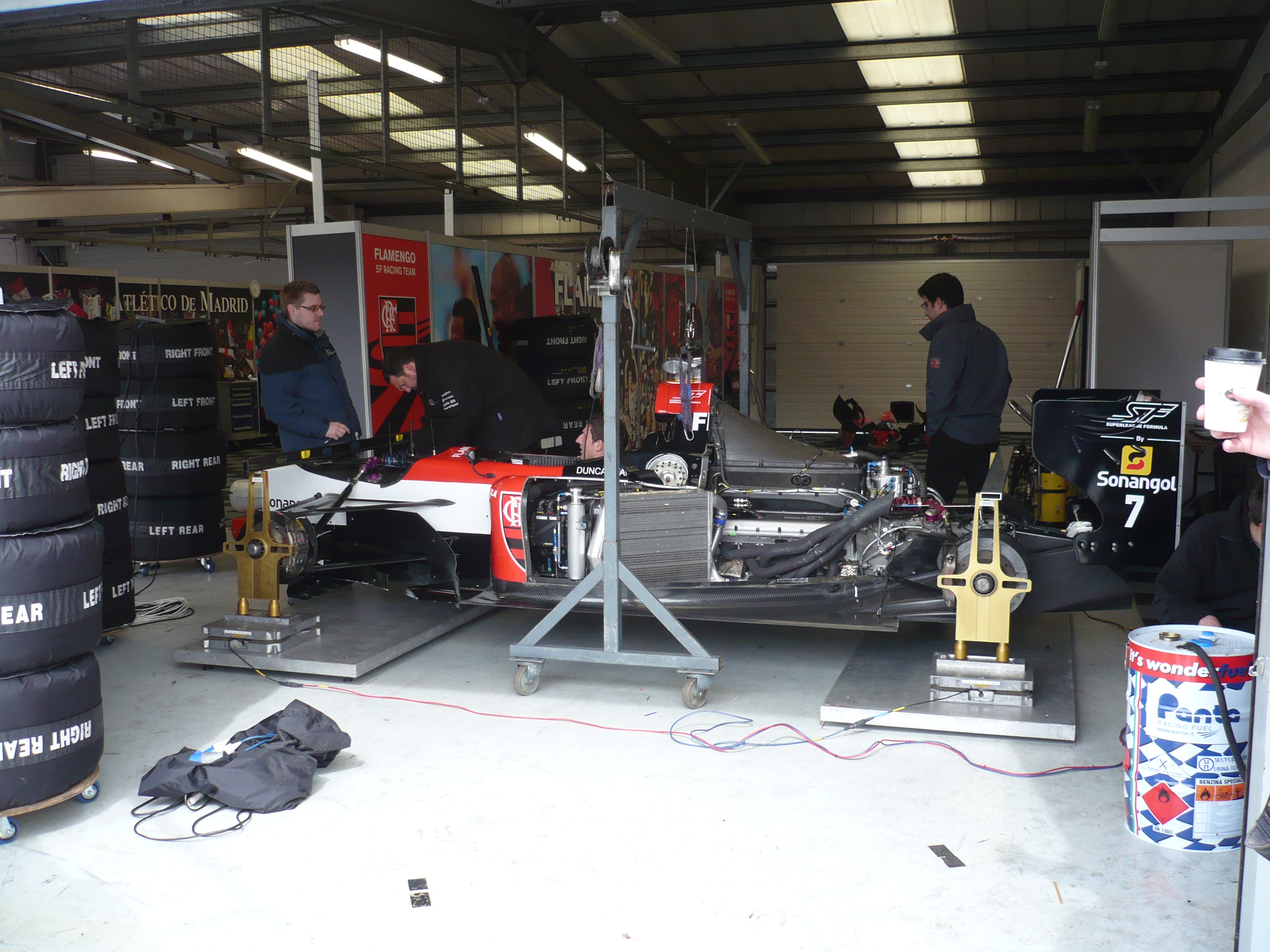
The inside of CR Flamengo's car in its pit garage at Silverstone Circuit (2010)

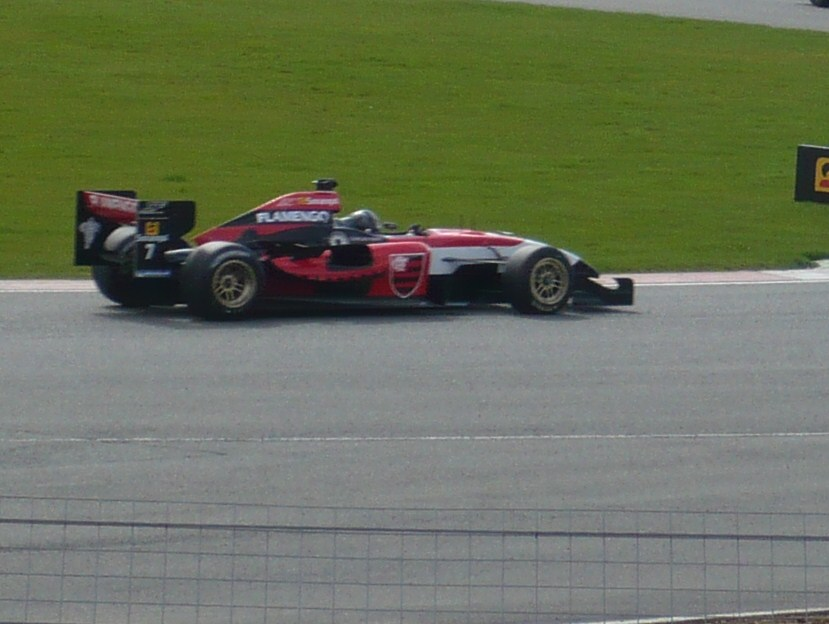
CR Flamengo car on track at Silverstone Circuit (2010)

Clube de Regatas do Flamengo Superleague Formula team is the racing team of Clube de Regatas do Flamengo, a football team that competes in Brazil in the Série A. The Flamengo racing team competes in the Superleague Formula. It was operated by Team Astromega during the first season.

== 2008 season ==
In the 2008 Superleague Formula season Flamengo finished overall in the 15th position. The car was drove in all rounds by Tuka Rocha.

== 2009 season ==
Flamengo will compete in the 2009 Superleague Formula season with the car being driven by ex-F1 and IndyCar racer Enrique Bernoldi.

== Record ==
(key)

=== 2008 ===
Operator(s)	Driver(s)	1		2		3		4		5		6		Points	Rank
Operator(s)	Driver(s)	DON		NÜR		ZOL		EST		VAL		JER		Points	Rank
Team Astromega	(Brazil) Tuka Rocha	16	2	16	16	9	14	11	10	4	18	17	13	189	16th

=== 2009 ===
- Super Final results in 2009 did not count for points towards the main championship.

Operator(s)	Driver(s)	1			2			3			4			5			6			Points	Rank
Operator(s)	Driver(s)	MAG			ZOL			DON			EST			MOZ			JAR			Points	Rank
Delta Motorsport/ADR	(Brazil) Enrique Bernoldi	6	8	X	7	18	–	18	14	X										191	16th
Azerti Motorsport	(Brazil) Enrique Bernoldi										13	3	X				11	12	X	191	16th
Azerti Motorsport	(United Kingdom) Jonathan Kennard													17	18	–				191	16th

=== 2010 ===
Operator(s)	Driver(s)	1			2			3			4			5			6			7			8			9			10			NC			11			Points	Rank
Operator(s)	Driver(s)	SIL			ASS			MAG			JAR			NÜR			ZOL			BRH			ADR			POR			ORD			BEI			NAV			Points	Rank
Alpha Team / Alpha Motorsport	(United Kingdom) Duncan Tappy	3	12	X													17	2	X	9	3	3	10	3	X	8	7	X										540	6th
Alpha Team / Alpha Motorsport	(France) Franck Perera				2	11	6	8	13	X	6	8	X	4	9	6																						540	6th
Alpha Team / Alpha Motorsport	(Spain) Andy Soucek																												17	3	X	DN	DN	C	4	18	X	540	6th

== See also ==
- CR Flamengo
- CR Flamengo (women)
- Flamengo Basketball
- Clube de Regatas do Flamengo (beach soccer)
- Flamengo Esports
