= Superleague Formula round Germany =

Professional sports event in Germany

- Nürburgring

Event information
- No. of events: 2
- First held: 2008
- Last held: 2010
- Most wins (club): (Italy) A.C. Milan 2
- Most wins (driver): (Netherlands) Yelmer Buurman 2

Last event (2010 Nürburgring) winners
Race 1	(Italy) A.C. Milan	Yelmer Buurman
Race 2	(Portugal) F.C. Porto	Álvaro Parente
S. Final	(Greece) Olympiacos CFP	Chris van der Drift

The Superleague Formula round Germany is a round of the Superleague Formula. In the 2008 edition at the Nürburgring, ex Formula One driver Robert Doornbos took his first Superleague Formula win, also taking A.C. Milan's first race victory. It was also the round where another Formula One driver Antônio Pizzonia made his Superleague Formula debut. In the events only other race, GP2 Series driver Yelmer Buurman took his and PSV Eindhovens first victory in Superleague Formula.

It has been confirmed that racing will return to Germany in 2010 with a round at the Nürburgring.

== Winners ==
Season	Race	Club	Driver	Location	Date	Report
2008	R1	(Italy) A.C. Milan	(Netherlands) Robert Doornbos	Nürburgring	September 21	Report
2008	R2	(Netherlands) PSV Eindhoven	(Netherlands) Yelmer Buurman	Nürburgring	September 21	Report
2010	R1	(Italy) A.C. Milan	(Netherlands) Yelmer Buurman	Nürburgring	June 27	Report
2010	R2	(Portugal) F.C. Porto	(Portugal) Álvaro Parente	Nürburgring	June 27	Report
2010	SF	(Greece) Olympiacos CFP	(New Zealand) Chris van der Drift	Nürburgring	June 27	Report
