= 2008 Jerez Superleague Formula round =

2008 Jerez Superleague Formula round Superleague Formula round Spain
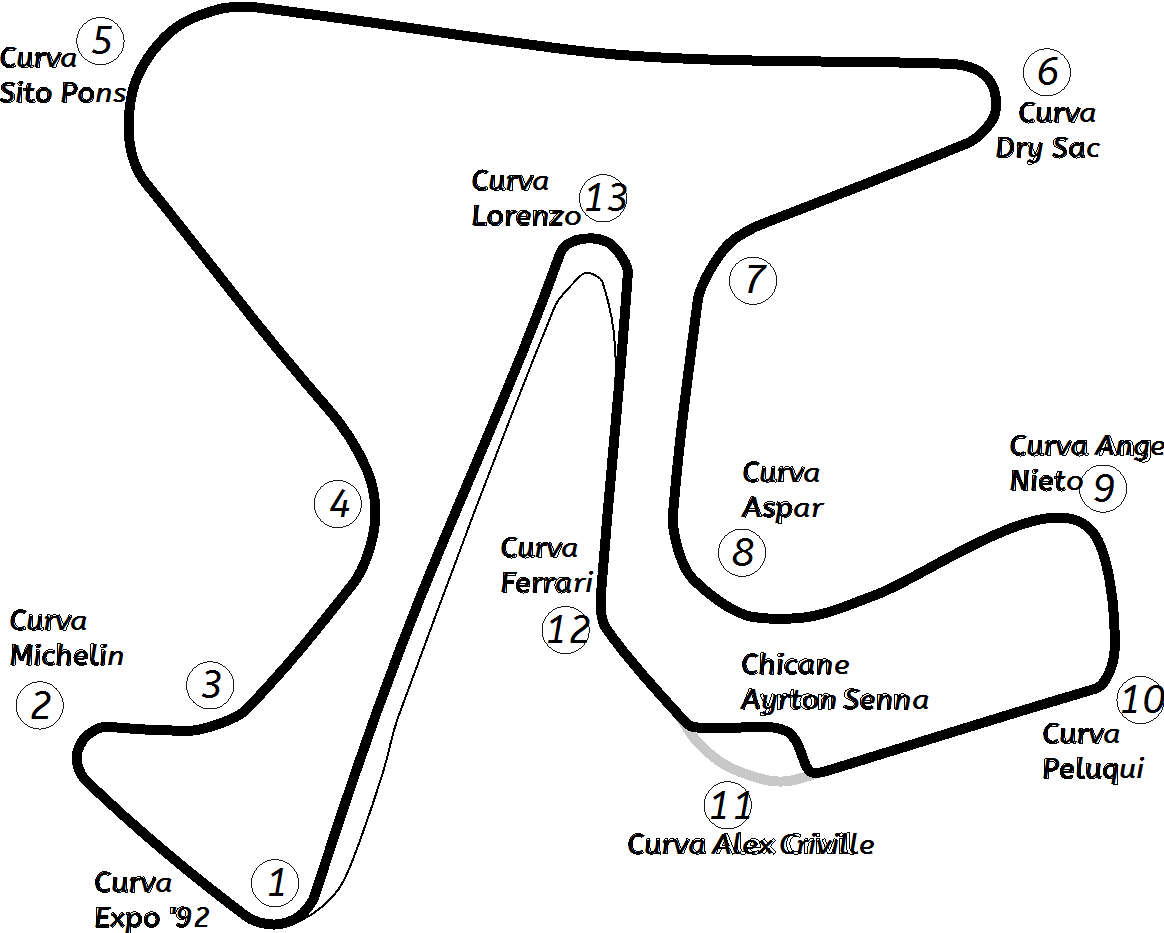
- Circuit Map
- Date: November 23, 2008
- Location: Circuito de Jerez, Jerez de la Frontera, Spain
- Course: Permanent racing facility 2.751 mi (4.427 km)
- Laps: 30 & 30
Pole position
Team	(England) Liverpool F.C.	Adrián Vallés
- Time: 1:29.088
Podium (1st race)
First	(Italy) A.C. Milan	Robert Doornbos
Second	(Portugal) F.C. Porto	Tristan Gommendy
Third	(England) Tottenham Hotspur	Duncan Tappy
Fastest lap (1st race)
Team	(Belgium) R.S.C. Anderlecht	Craig Dolby
- Time: 1:30.101 (on lap 12)
Podium (2nd race)
First	(Germany) Borussia Dortmund	James Walker
Second	(Brazil) SC Corinthians	Antônio Pizzonia
Third	(China) Beijing Guoan	Davide Rigon
Fastest lap (2nd race)
Team	(China) Beijing Guoan	Davide Rigon
- Time: 1:30.029 (on lap 12)

The 2008 Jerez Superleague Formula round was the sixth and final round of the inaugural Superleague Formula championship, with the races taking place on November 23, 2008. Eighteen football teams were represented on the grid, the same number of teams as there was at the previous four rounds. There were two driver changes before this round of the championship: James Walker replaced Enrico Toccacelo in the Borussia Dortmund car and Bertrand Baguette returned to the Al Ain cockpit replacing Dominick Muermans. Paul Meijer had been expected to return, however his injury from the previous round at Vallelunga kept him out. The meeting saw a second win for A.C. Milan and a first win for Borussia Dortmund. With a ninth in the first race coupled with other low placings for Liverpool F.C. and PSV Eindhoven, Beijing Guoan clinched the first Superleague Formula title. With a third in the final race, Beijing won the title with 413 points, some 66 points clear of PSV, and two points further back were Milan.

== Report ==
=== Qualifying ===
After the random draw which split the eighteen-car field into two groups, the fastest four qualifiers from each progressed into the knockout stages to decide places 1 to 8 on the grid. Max Wissel (FC Basel 1893) and Bertrand Baguette (Al Ain) both missed out on the top eight, despite setting times faster than Group B 4th Borja García in the Sevilla FC car. As fastest drivers in their groups, Adrián Vallés (Liverpool F.C.) and Franck Perera (A.S. Roma) were expected to meet in the final, and sure enough, they did. Vallés became the first repeat polesitter in Superleague, with his 1:29.088 beating Perera's 1:29.328.

=== Race 1 ===
At the start, Vallés led away from Perera, with Andy Soucek (Atlético Madrid) passing Tristan Gommendy (F.C. Porto) for third on the opening lap. On lap five, Wissel spun out of tenth place, and this allowed Craig Dolby's R.S.C. Anderlecht car into the top ten and towards the front, Soucek passed Perera for second place. Lap seven saw the first retirement, with Alessandro Pier Guidi pulling the Galatasaray S.K. car off with engine troubles. Lap eight saw the first pitstop - Antônio Pizzonia (SC Corinthians) pitting from sixth position. Vallés then brought in the Liverpool machine on lap nine, allowing Soucek through into the lead. Tuka Rocha retired on lap ten, having suddenly slowed the lap before in the CR Flamengo car, nearly taking out Davide Rigon's championship-leading Beijing Guoan car due to gearbox issues. Soucek continued to lead until his pitstop on lap 14 - except he didn't make it all the way to the garage. A spin on the way in, caused too much damage and Soucek retired. Vallés thus returned to lead by over 10 seconds from Robert Doornbos (A.C. Milan), Pizzonia, Gommendy and Duncan Tappy (Tottenham Hotspur). Fifteen of the sixteen laps remaining passed and Vallés looked untroubled. However, the engine in the Liverpool car died on the final lap, and Vallés fell from first to seventh, and with it went the championship hopes. Doornbos inherited victory ahead of Gommendy, Tappy, Dolby, Perera, García, Vallés, Yelmer Buurman (PSV Eindhoven), Rigon (which sealed the championship for Beijing Guoan), Baguette, Wissel, Pizzonia (who had been demoted due to pitting outside the window), Stamatis Katsimis (Olympiacos CFP), James Walker (Borussia Dortmund) and Ryan Dalziel (Rangers F.C.), who was seven laps down.

=== Race 2 ===
Pier Guidi started from pole for the final race of the season, with Rocha alongside. Again, Soucek made up a place at the start, passing Walker for fourth. Pier Guidi's lead was up to nine seconds on lap six, when Soucek exited from fourth - spinning out to complete a miserable weekend. Lap eight saw a massive shunt, involving seventh-placed Katsimis and eighth-placed Wissel clashed in spectacular fashion - Wissel going over the back over the Olympiacos machine. Most teams started pitting on lap ten, with Pier Guidi pitting on lap twelve. Pizzonia took the lead for one lap before his pitstop, handing Dalziel the lead. During these stops, Vallés and Tappy both retired with gearbox failures. Pier Guidi returned to the lead, leading by some fourteen seconds from Walker, Pizzonia, Rigon and Rocha. However, Pier Guidi was struggling with his new set of tyres, and within five laps, the lead was only four seconds and was one second by lap 23. The pressure got to the Italian as he spun down to fourth at the entrance to the back straight. At the same time, Rocha exited fifth place with a spin into the barriers. That's how it finished, as Walker went on to claim the first victory for Dortmund, winning by 1.5 seconds from Pizzonia and Rigon, before a massive gap to the rest of the field led by Pier Guidi followed by Perera, Dalziel, Baguette, Dolby, Buurman, Doornbos, García and Gommendy.

== Results ==
=== Qualifying ===
- In each group, the top four qualify for the quarter-finals.

==== Group A ====
Pos.	Team	Driver	Time
1	(England) Liverpool F.C.	(Spain) Adrián Vallés	1:28.998
2	(Spain) Atlético Madrid	(Spain) Andy Soucek	1:29.192
3	(Portugal) F.C. Porto	(France) Tristan Gommendy	1:29.208
4	(Brazil) SC Corinthians	(Brazil) Antônio Pizzonia	1:29.598
5	(Switzerland) FC Basel 1893	(Germany) Max Wissel	1:29.600
6	(United Arab Emirates) Al Ain	(Belgium) Bertrand Baguette	1:29.851
7	(Netherlands) PSV Eindhoven	(Netherlands) Yelmer Buurman	1:29.948
8	(Greece) Olympiacos CFP	(Greece) Stamatis Katsimis	1:30.280
9	(China) Beijing Guoan	(Italy) Davide Rigon	1:43.254

==== Group B ====
Pos.	Team	Driver	Time
1	(Italy) A.S. Roma	(France) Franck Perera	1:28.986
2	(Italy) A.C. Milan	(Netherlands) Robert Doornbos	1:29.040
3	(Turkey) Galatasaray S.K.	(Italy) Alessandro Pier Guidi	1:29.571
4	(Spain) Sevilla FC	(Spain) Borja García	1:29.940
5	(England) Tottenham Hotspur	(United Kingdom) Duncan Tappy	1:30.088
6	(Scotland) Rangers F.C.	(United Kingdom) Ryan Dalziel	1:30.114
7	(Belgium) R.S.C. Anderlecht	(United Kingdom) Craig Dolby	1:30.142
8	(Brazil) CR Flamengo	(Brazil) Tuka Rocha	1:30.771
9	(Germany) Borussia Dortmund	(United Kingdom) James Walker	no time

==== Knockout stages ====
Quarter-Finals			Semi-Finals			Pole Shoot Out
A1	Liverpool F.C.	1:28.778
B4	Sevilla FC	1:29.742	A1	Liverpool F.C.	1:28.952
A3	F.C. Porto	1:29.041	A3	F.C. Porto	1:29.499
B2	A.C. Milan	1:29.223				A1	Liverpool F.C.	1:29.088
A2	Atlético Madrid	1:29.634				B1	A.S. Roma	1:29.328
B3	Galatasaray S.K.	1:30.811	A2	Atlético Madrid	1:29.317
A4	SC Corinthians	1:29.598	B1	A.S. Roma	1:28.889
B1	A.S. Roma	1:28.986

==== Grid ====
Pos.	Team	Driver	Time
1	(England) Liverpool F.C.	(Spain) Adrián Vallés	1:29.088
2	(Italy) A.S. Roma	(France) Franck Perera	1:29.328
3	(Portugal) F.C. Porto	(France) Tristan Gommendy	1:29.499
4	(Spain) Atlético Madrid	(Spain) Andy Soucek	1:29.317
5	(Turkey) Galatasaray S.K.	(Italy) Alessandro Pier Guidi	1:30.811
6	(Italy) A.C. Milan	(Netherlands) Robert Doornbos	1:29.223
7	(Spain) Sevilla FC	(Spain) Borja García	1:29.742
8	(Brazil) SC Corinthians	(Brazil) Antônio Pizzonia	1:29.966
9	(England) Tottenham Hotspur	(United Kingdom) Duncan Tappy	1:30.088
10	(Switzerland) FC Basel 1893	(Germany) Max Wissel	1:29.600
11	(Scotland) Rangers F.C.	(United Kingdom) Ryan Dalziel	1:30.114
12	(United Arab Emirates) Al Ain	(Belgium) Bertrand Baguette	1:29.851
13	(Belgium) R.S.C. Anderlecht	(United Kingdom) Craig Dolby	1:30.142
14	(Netherlands) PSV Eindhoven	(Netherlands) Yelmer Buurman	1:29.948
15	(Brazil) CR Flamengo	(Brazil) Tuka Rocha	1:30.771
16	(Greece) Olympiacos CFP	(Greece) Stamatis Katsimis	1:30.280
17	(China) Beijing Guoan	(Italy) Davide Rigon	1:43.254
18	(Germany) Borussia Dortmund	(United Kingdom) James Walker	no time

=== Race 1 ===
Pos	No	Team	Driver	Laps	Time/Retired	Grid	Pts.
1	3	(Italy) A.C. Milan	(Netherlands) Robert Doornbos	30	46:39.203	6	50
2	16	(Portugal) F.C. Porto	(France) Tristan Gommendy	30	+1.290	3	45
3	19	(England) Tottenham Hotspur	(United Kingdom) Duncan Tappy	30	+4.122	9	40
4	8	(Belgium) R.S.C. Anderlecht	(United Kingdom) Craig Dolby	30	+5.428	13	36
5	22	(Italy) A.S. Roma	(France) Franck Perera	30	+7.059	2	32
6	18	(Spain) Sevilla FC	(Spain) Borja García	30	+7.684	7	29
7	21	(England) Liverpool F.C.	(Spain) Adrián Vallés	30	+7.984	1	26
8	5	(Netherlands) PSV Eindhoven	(Netherlands) Yelmer Buurman	30	+8.208	14	23
9	12	(China) Beijing Guoan	(Italy) Davide Rigon	30	+15.810	17	20
10	6	(United Arab Emirates) Al Ain	(Belgium) Bertrand Baguette	30	+27.206	12	18
11	10	(Switzerland) FC Basel 1893	(Germany) Max Wissel	30	+28.989	10	16
12	14	(Brazil) SC Corinthians	(Brazil) Antônio Pizzonia	30	+30.628*	8	14
13	9	(Greece) Olympiacos CFP	(Greece) Stamatis Katsimis	30	+52.609	16	12
14	11	(Germany) Borussia Dortmund	(United Kingdom) James Walker	30	+53.063	18	10
15	17	(Scotland) Rangers F.C.	(United Kingdom) Ryan Dalziel	23	+7 Laps	11	8
16	15	(Spain) Atlético Madrid	(Spain) Andy Soucek	13	Spin	4	7
17	7	(Brazil) CR Flamengo	(Brazil) Tuka Rocha	9	Gearbox	15	6
18	4	(Turkey) Galatasaray S.K.	(Italy) Alessandro Pier Guidi	6	Engine	5	5
Fastest lap: Craig Dolby (R.S.C. Anderlecht) 1:30.101 (109.934 mph)

* - Pizzonia penalised 30 seconds for pitting outside the compulsory window.

=== Race 2 ===
Pos	No	Team	Driver	Laps	Time/Retired	Grid	Pts.
1	11	(Germany) Borussia Dortmund	(United Kingdom) James Walker	30	46:42.999	4	50
2	14	(Brazil) SC Corinthians	(Brazil) Antônio Pizzonia	30	+1.535	7	45
3	12	(China) Beijing Guoan	(Italy) Davide Rigon	30	+2.345	10	40
4	4	(Turkey) Galatasaray S.K.	(Italy) Alessandro Pier Guidi	30	+25.500	1	36
5	22	(Italy) A.S. Roma	(France) Franck Perera	30	+25.731	14	32
6	17	(Scotland) Rangers F.C.	(United Kingdom) Ryan Dalziel	30	+30.622	3	29
7	6	(United Arab Emirates) Al Ain	(Belgium) Bertrand Baguette	30	+31.906	9	26
8	8	(Belgium) R.S.C. Anderlecht	(United Kingdom) Craig Dolby	30	+32.986	15	23
9	5	(Netherlands) PSV Eindhoven	(Netherlands) Yelmer Buurman	30	+34.756	11	20
10	3	(Italy) A.C. Milan	(Netherlands) Robert Doornbos	30	+38.723	18	18
11	18	(Spain) Sevilla FC	(Spain) Borja García	30	+40.878	13	16
12	16	(Portugal) F.C. Porto	(France) Tristan Gommendy	30	+41.205	17	14
13	7	(Brazil) CR Flamengo	(Brazil) Tuka Rocha	23	Spin	2	12
14	19	(England) Tottenham Hotspur	(United Kingdom) Duncan Tappy	14	Gearbox	16	10
15	21	(England) Liverpool F.C.	(Spain) Adrián Vallés	13	Gearbox	12	8
16	9	(Greece) Olympiacos CFP	(Greece) Stamatis Katsimis	7	Accident	6	7
17	10	(Switzerland) FC Basel 1893	(Germany) Max Wissel	7	Accident	8	6
18	15	(Spain) Atlético Madrid	(Spain) Andy Soucek	5	Spin	5*	5
Fastest lap: Davide Rigon (Beijing Guoan) 1:30.029 (?? mph)

* - Soucek penalised two places for causing an avoidable accident.
