= Al Ain (Superleague Formula team) =

Al Ain SF Racing Team
Founded	2008
Country	United Arab Emirates
Driver(s)	Andreas Zuber (2008); Bertrand Baguette (2008); Paul Meijer (2008); Dominick Muermans (2008); Miguel Molina (2009); Esteban Guerrieri (2009)
First race	2008 Donington
Last race	2009 Zolder
Rounds	8
Ch'ships	0
Total points	379 (including Super Finals)
2010 position	n/a (n/a pts)
Races / Poles / Wins / Podiums / F. Laps; 16 / 0 / 2 / 2 / 0
NOTE - Data not including Super Finals

Al Ain Superleague Formula team was a motor racing team representing the UAE's Al Ain Club in the Superleague Formula championship.

== 2008 and 2009 seasons ==
They finished 12th in the inaugural championship with drivers Andreas Zuber, Bertrand Baguette, Paul Meijer and Dominick Muermans. It was initially announced that Giorgio Pantano would drive for the team in the second SF season, but it was then announced they would not return. However, days later, they were added to the official entry list once again and participated in the first 2 rounds of the season, represented by Spain's Miguel Molina in round 1 and Argentina's Esteban Guerrieri in round 2. However, despite winning the 2nd race at Zolder with series debutant Guerrieri, they were replaced by Sevilla FC from round 3 of the championship. Ultimate Motorsport will service the returning Sevilla entry.

== Record ==
(key)

=== 2008 ===
Operator(s)	Driver(s)	1		2		3		4		5		6		Points	Rank
Operator(s)	Driver(s)	DON		NÜR		ZOL		EST		VAL		JER		Points	Rank
Azerti Motorsport	(United Arab Emirates) Andreas Zuber	6	15	11	11									244	12th
Azerti Motorsport	(Belgium) Bertrand Baguette					11	10					10	7	244	12th
Azerti Motorsport	(Netherlands) Paul Meijer							12	1					244	12th
Azerti Motorsport	(Netherlands) Dominick Muermans									14	8			244	12th

=== 2009 ===
- Super Final results in 2009 did not count for points towards the main championship.

Operator(s)	Driver(s)	1			2			3	4	5	6	Points	Rank
Operator(s)	Driver(s)	MAG			ZOL			DON	EST	MOZ	JAR	Points	Rank
Ultimate Motorsport	(Spain) Miguel Molina	9	4	X								135	19th
Ultimate Motorsport	(Argentina) Esteban Guerrieri				6	1	–					135	19th
