= 2010 Nürburgring Superleague Formula round =

2010 Nürburgring Superleague Formula round Superleague Formula round Germany
- Circuit Map
- Date: June 27, 2010
- Location: Nürburgring, Nürburg, Germany
- Course: Permanent racing facility 3.199 mi (5.148 km)
- Laps: 26 & 25
Pole position
Team	(Italy) A.S. Roma	Julien Jousse
- Time: 1:44.401
Podium (1st race)
First	(Italy) A.C. Milan	Yelmer Buurman
Second	(Belgium) R.S.C. Anderlecht	Davide Rigon
Third	(Greece) Olympiacos CFP	Chris van der Drift
Fastest lap (1st race)
Team	(Switzerland) FC Basel 1893	Max Wissel
- Time: 1:44.896 (on lap 13)
Podium (2nd race)
First	(Portugal) F.C. Porto	Álvaro Parente
Second	(France) GD Bordeaux	Franck Montagny
Third	(Turkey) Galatasaray S.K.	Tristan Gommendy
Fastest lap (2nd race)
Team	(France) GD Bordeaux	Franck Montagny
- Time: 1:45.414 (on lap 11)

The 2010 Nürburgring Superleague Formula round was a Superleague Formula round held on June 27, 2010, at the Nürburgring circuit, Nürburg, Germany. It was the first time since 2008 that Superleague Formula visited the Nürburgring circuit. It was the fifth round of the 2010 Superleague Formula season.

Eighteen clubs took part, although none from Germany. It was the first time that a Superleague Formula round did not feature a club from that country. In 2008, German club Borussia Dortmund took part in the Nürburgring round.

Support races included the Radical Masters.

== Results ==
=== Qualifying ===
- In each group, the top four qualify for the quarter-finals.

== Standings after the round ==
Pos	Team	Points
1	(England) Tottenham Hotspur	370
2	(Italy) A.C. Milan	340
3	(Switzerland) FC Basel 1893	297
4	(Belgium) R.S.C. Anderlecht	294
5	(Greece) Olympiacos CFP	273
