= Borussia Dortmund (Superleague Formula team) =

Borussia Dortmund SF Racing Team
| Founded | 2008 |
| Country | Germany |
| Driver(s) | Nelson Philippe (2008); Paul Meijer (2008); Enrico Toccacelo (2008); James Walker (2008) |
| First race | 2008 Donington |
| Last race | 2008 Jerez |
| Rounds | 6 |
| Ch'ships | 0 |
| Total points | 218 (including Super Finals) |
| 2010 position | n/a (n/a pts) |
Races / Poles / Wins / Podiums / F. Laps; 11 / 1 / 1 / 2 / 1
NOTE - Data not including Super Finals

Borussia Dortmund Superleague Formula team was the racing team of Borussia Dortmund, a football club that competes in Germany in the Fußball-Bundesliga. The Borussia Dortmund racing team competed in the Superleague Formula. They were operated by former Formula One team Zakspeed. They did not return for the 2009 season.

== 2008 season ==
In the 2008 Superleague Formula season Borussia Dortmund finished 14th overall. They had 1 win in the final event of the year at the 2008 Jerez round during James Walker's only round for the team. James Walker had also been the driver of Rangers F.C.

Other performances of note include Paul Meijer taking a debut pole at the 2008 Zolder round. He finished on the podium in 3rd from that race. Meijer switched to the Al Ain team and won for them at the next round at Estoril.

== Record ==
(key)

=== 2008 ===
| Operator(s) | Driver(s) | 1 | | 2 | | 3 | | 4 | | 5 | | 6 | | Points | Rank |
| Operator(s) | Driver(s) | DON | | NÜR | | ZOL | | EST | | VAL | | JER | | Points | Rank |
|---|---|---|---|---|---|---|---|---|---|---|---|---|---|---|---|
| Zakspeed | (France) Nelson Philippe | 15 | 4 | 15 | DN | | | | | | | | | 218 | 14th |
| Zakspeed | (Netherlands) Paul Meijer | | | | | 3 | 11 | | | | | | | 218 | 14th |
| Zakspeed | (Italy) Enrico Toccacelo | | | | | | | 17 | 6 | 18 | 14 | | | 218 | 14th |
| Zakspeed | (United Kingdom) James Walker | | | | | | | | | | | 14 | 1 | 218 | 14th |
