= 2008 Zolder Superleague Formula round =

2008 Zolder Superleague Formula round Superleague Formula round Belgium
- Circuit Map
- Date: October 5, 2008
- Location: Circuit Zolder, Heusden-Zolder, Belgium
- Course: Permanent racing facility 2.492 mi (4.010 km)
- Laps: 24 & 26
Pole position
Team	(Germany) Borussia Dortmund	Paul Meijer
- Time: 1:20.826
Podium (1st race)
First	(England) Liverpool F.C.	Adrián Vallés
Second	(Belgium) R.S.C. Anderlecht	Craig Dolby
Third	(Germany) Borussia Dortmund	Paul Meijer
Fastest lap (1st race)
Team	(England) Liverpool F.C.	Adrián Vallés
- Time: 1:38.031 (on lap 14)
Podium (2nd race)
First	(China) Beijing Guoan	Davide Rigon
Second	(England) Tottenham Hotspur	Duncan Tappy
Third	(Netherlands) PSV Eindhoven	Yelmer Buurman
Fastest lap (2nd race)
Team	(Spain) Atlético Madrid	Andy Soucek
- Time: 1:37.370 (on lap 11)

The 2008 Zolder Superleague Formula round was the third round of the inaugural Superleague Formula championship, with the races taking place on October 5, 2008. Eighteen football teams were represented on the grid, the same number of teams as there was at the Nürburgring. There were three driver changes for this round of the championship: Ryan Dalziel returned to the Rangers F.C. car (replacing James Walker), after missing the previous round due to a clash with his Rolex Sports Car Series commitments at Miller Motorsports Park. Two drivers made their debuts, with Dutchman Paul Meijer replacing Nelson Philippe in the car representing Borussia Dortmund and Belgian Bertrand Baguette replaced Andreas Zuber in the Al Ain car. The meeting saw a first win for Liverpool F.C. and a second win for championship leaders Beijing Guoan. However, the championship lead for the Chinese side was cut to 14 points.

== Report ==
=== Qualifying ===
After the random draw which split the eighteen-car field into two groups, the fastest four qualifiers from each progressed into the knockout stages to decide places 1 to 8 on the grid. For the third race in succession, drivers missed out on places in the knockout stages, despite setting a faster time than the fourth-placed qualifier in the slower group. On this occasion, three Group A drivers were eliminated despite setting times up to half a second faster than the fourth-placed qualifier of Group B. The unlucky drivers turned out to be Max Wissel (FC Basel 1893), Ryan Dalziel (Rangers F.C.) and Enrico Toccacelo (A.S. Roma), who were all quicker than Craig Dolby's R.S.C. Anderlecht machine, which made it through from Group B. A.C. Milan and Atlético Madrid topped their respective groups and were expected to face each other in the final, yet both teams were eliminated in the quarter-finals by Anderlecht and Paul Meijer's Borussia Dortmund machine. Sevilla FC and Liverpool F.C. were the other semi-finalists, yet neither would make the final as Meijer and Dolby sealed their places by beating the somewhat more experienced GP2 Series drivers Borja García and Adrián Vallés. In the final, Dolby would not set a time, thus giving Meijer a debut pole, becoming the third different polesitter in three races.

=== Race 1 ===
A wet raceday greeted the drivers on Sunday, and it was all action right from the rolling start. Fifth-placed Davide Rigon (Beijing Guoan) and seventh-placed Robert Doornbos (A.C. Milan) came together, with Doornbos being unsighted due to the spray. The accident caused terminal damage to both cars, yet would aid them for the second race of the afternoon - thanks to the reverse grid system. Dolby had taken the lead off Meijer ahead of the midfield chaos, due to a tentative start by the Dutch rookie. The two ran in very close formation, until a safety car was called for on lap 4, with García in the wall at the Lucien Bianchi Bocht, having dropped a wheel on the wet grass. The mandatory pit stop window came as the safety car was out, and after the race went green, the first of the leaders came in - Vallés from third, complaining of a vibration and balance issues on the Liverpool car. These new boots had an effect on the Spanish driver rattling off a series of fastest laps and coupled with shoddy pitstops by Dolby and Meijer, a first win was on the cards. Not even a late safety car for spinners Toccacelo and Alessandro Pier Guidi (Galatasaray S.K.) could halt the Vallés steamroller, as he would go on to win by 2.257 seconds from Dolby, recording his third runner-up placing in five races. Following them home were Meijer, Wissel, Andy Soucek (Atlético Madrid), Tristan Gommendy (F.C. Porto), Yelmer Buurman (PSV Eindhoven), Dalziel, Tuka Rocha (CR Flamengo), Antônio Pizzonia (SC Corinthians), Bertrand Baguette (Al Ain), with Duncan Tappy (Tottenham Hotspur) completing the finishers, having suffered a puncture.

=== Race 2 ===
After the first race clash between them, Rigon and Doornbos lined up together on the front row and just like the first race, the outside of turn one saw the second-place starter overtake the polesitter around the outside, with Rigon skating his way around the Dutchman. But again, the safety car came out for a first-lap incident. Pizzonia had misjudged his braking point for the Klein Chicane, barrelled past a number of cars and skated straight into Dalziel, causing both to retire. After this safety car period, Rigon strolled off into a 23-second victory, leaving the rest of the field in his wake. The battle for second was on with both Doornbos and Toccacelo struggling with car setups. Buurman made a mistake while trying to pass the Italian, knocking his pit limiter on and lost ground. García spun again, with an almost carbon copy of his race one spin - this time, he stayed on circuit. With all the problems about him, Tappy moved through the melée and ended up second, ahead of Buurman, Doornbos, Wissel, Vallés, Toccacelo, García, Kasper Andersen (Olympiacos CFP), Baguette, Meijer, Pier Guidi, Soucek, Rocha and Gommendy. With the win, Rigon managed to get back some of the damage caused to the points lead in race one - Guoan's championship lead now stands at 14 points from PSV with Sevilla falling further back.

== Results ==
=== Qualifying ===
- In each group, the top four qualify for the quarter-finals.

==== Group A ====
Pos.	Team	Driver	Time
1	(Italy) A.C. Milan	(Netherlands) Robert Doornbos	1:17.309
2	(Spain) Sevilla FC	(Spain) Borja García	1:17.383
3	(England) Liverpool F.C.	(Spain) Adrián Vallés	1:17.587
4	(Germany) Borussia Dortmund	(Netherlands) Paul Meijer	1:17.733
5	(Switzerland) FC Basel 1893	(Germany) Max Wissel	1:17.798
6	(Scotland) Rangers F.C.	(United Kingdom) Ryan Dalziel	1:17.839
7	(Italy) A.S. Roma	(Italy) Enrico Toccacelo	1:17.949
8	(Greece) Olympiacos CFP	(Denmark) Kasper Andersen	1:18.812
9	(Netherlands) PSV Eindhoven	(Netherlands) Yelmer Buurman	1:19.285

==== Group B ====
Pos.	Team	Driver	Time
1	(Spain) Atlético Madrid	(Spain) Andy Soucek	1:16.969
2	(Portugal) F.C. Porto	(France) Tristan Gommendy	1:17.341
3	(China) Beijing Guoan	(Italy) Davide Rigon	1:18.131
4	(Belgium) R.S.C. Anderlecht	(United Kingdom) Craig Dolby	1:18.313
5	(England) Tottenham Hotspur	(United Kingdom) Duncan Tappy	1:18.389
6	(Turkey) Galatasaray S.K.	(Italy) Alessandro Pier Guidi	1:18.563
7	(Brazil) CR Flamengo	(Brazil) Tuka Rocha	1:18.981
8	(Brazil) SC Corinthians	(Brazil) Antônio Pizzonia	1:19.017
9	(United Arab Emirates) Al Ain	(Belgium) Bertrand Baguette	1:19.115

==== Knockout stages ====
Quarter-Finals			Semi-Finals			Pole Shoot Out
A1	A.C. Milan	1:18.169
B4	R.S.C. Anderlecht	1:17.296	B4	R.S.C. Anderlecht	1:17.191
A3	Liverpool F.C.	1:17.418	A3	Liverpool F.C.	1:19.006
B2	F.C. Porto	1:18.657				B4	R.S.C. Anderlecht	no time
A2	Sevilla FC	1:17.104				A4	Borussia Dortmund	1:20.826
B3	Beijing Guoan	1:17.901	A2	Sevilla FC	1:17.423
A4	Borussia Dortmund	1:17.418	A4	Borussia Dortmund	1:17.223
B1	Atlético Madrid	1:17.772

==== Grid ====
Pos.	Team	Driver	Time
1	(Germany) Borussia Dortmund	(Netherlands) Paul Meijer	1:20.826
2	(Belgium) R.S.C. Anderlecht	(United Kingdom) Craig Dolby	no time
3	(England) Liverpool F.C.	(Spain) Adrián Vallés	1:19.006
4	(Spain) Sevilla FC	(Spain) Borja García	1:17.423
5	(China) Beijing Guoan	(Italy) Davide Rigon	1:17.901
6	(Portugal) F.C. Porto	(France) Tristan Gommendy	1:18.657
7	(Italy) A.C. Milan	(Netherlands) Robert Doornbos	1:18.169
8	(Spain) Atlético Madrid	(Spain) Andy Soucek	1:17.772
9	(England) Tottenham Hotspur	(United Kingdom) Duncan Tappy	1:18.389
10	(Switzerland) FC Basel 1893	(Germany) Max Wissel	1:17.798
11	(Turkey) Galatasaray S.K.	(Italy) Alessandro Pier Guidi	1:18.563
12	(Scotland) Rangers F.C.	(United Kingdom) Ryan Dalziel	1:17.839
13	(Brazil) CR Flamengo	(Brazil) Tuka Rocha	1:18.981
14	(Italy) A.S. Roma	(Italy) Enrico Toccacelo	1:17.949
15	(Brazil) SC Corinthians	(Brazil) Antônio Pizzonia	1:19.017
16	(Greece) Olympiacos CFP	(Denmark) Kasper Andersen	1:18.812
17	(United Arab Emirates) Al Ain	(Belgium) Bertrand Baguette	1:19.115
18	(Netherlands) PSV Eindhoven	(Netherlands) Yelmer Buurman	1:19.285

=== Race 1 ===
Pos	No	Team	Driver	Laps	Time/Retired	Grid	Pts.
1	21	(England) Liverpool F.C.	(Spain) Adrián Vallés	24	45:51.628	3	50
2	8	(Belgium) R.S.C. Anderlecht	(United Kingdom) Craig Dolby	24	+2.257	2	45
3	11	(Germany) Borussia Dortmund	(Netherlands) Paul Meijer	24	+4.045	1	40
4	10	(Switzerland) FC Basel 1893	(Germany) Max Wissel	24	+5.928	10	36
5	15	(Spain) Atlético Madrid	(Spain) Andy Soucek	24	+8.201	8	32
6	16	(Portugal) F.C. Porto	(France) Tristan Gommendy	24	+9.111	6	29
7	5	(Netherlands) PSV Eindhoven	(Netherlands) Yelmer Buurman	24	+11.435	18	26
8	17	(Scotland) Rangers F.C.	(United Kingdom) Ryan Dalziel	24	+11.601	12	23
9	7	(Brazil) CR Flamengo	(Brazil) Tuka Rocha	24	+12.784	13	20
10	14	(Brazil) SC Corinthians	(Brazil) Antônio Pizzonia	24	+13.650	15	18
11	6	(United Arab Emirates) Al Ain	(Belgium) Bertrand Baguette	24	+14.482	17	16
12	19	(England) Tottenham Hotspur	(United Kingdom) Duncan Tappy	23	+1 Lap	9	14
13	22	(Italy) A.S. Roma	(Italy) Enrico Toccacelo	18	Spin	14	12
14	4	(Turkey) Galatasaray S.K.	(Italy) Alessandro Pier Guidi	18	Spin	11	10
15	9	(Greece) Olympiacos CFP	(Denmark) Kasper Andersen	17	Spin	16	8
16	18	(Spain) Sevilla FC	(Spain) Borja García	3	Accident	4	7
17	12	(China) Beijing Guoan	(Italy) Davide Rigon	1	Accident	5	6
18	3	(Italy) A.C. Milan	(Netherlands) Robert Doornbos	0	Accident	7	5
Fastest lap: Adrián Vallés (Liverpool F.C.) 1:38.031 (91.526 mph)

=== Race 2 ===
Pos	No	Team	Driver	Laps	Time/Retired	Grid	Pts.
1	12	(China) Beijing Guoan	(Italy) Davide Rigon	26	47:23.624	2	50
2	19	(England) Tottenham Hotspur	(United Kingdom) Duncan Tappy	26	+23.436	7	45
3	5	(Netherlands) PSV Eindhoven	(Netherlands) Yelmer Buurman	26	+24.504	12	40
4	3	(Italy) A.C. Milan	(Netherlands) Robert Doornbos	26	+26.176	1	36
5	10	(Switzerland) FC Basel 1893	(Germany) Max Wissel	26	+29.097	15	32
6	21	(England) Liverpool F.C.	(Spain) Adrián Vallés	26	+31.260	18	29
7	22	(Italy) A.S. Roma	(Italy) Enrico Toccacelo	26	+34.194	6	26
8	18	(Spain) Sevilla FC	(Spain) Borja García	26	+34.270	3	23
9	9	(Greece) Olympiacos CFP	(Denmark) Kasper Andersen	26	+34.742	4	20
10	6	(United Arab Emirates) Al Ain	(Belgium) Bertrand Baguette	26	+50.926	8	18
11	11	(Germany) Borussia Dortmund	(Netherlands) Paul Meijer	26	+50.948	16	16
12	4	(Turkey) Galatasaray S.K.	(Italy) Alessandro Pier Guidi	26	+51.286	5	14
13	15	(Spain) Atlético Madrid	(Spain) Andy Soucek	26	+55.993	14	12
14	7	(Brazil) CR Flamengo	(Brazil) Tuka Rocha	26	+1:13.191	10	10
15	16	(Portugal) F.C. Porto	(France) Tristan Gommendy	26	+1:21.368	13	8
16	8	(Belgium) R.S.C. Anderlecht	(United Kingdom) Craig Dolby	18	Transmission	17	7
17	17	(Scotland) Rangers F.C.	(United Kingdom) Ryan Dalziel	1	Suspension	11	6
18	14	(Brazil) SC Corinthians	(Brazil) Antônio Pizzonia	0	Accident	9	5
Fastest lap: Andy Soucek (Atlético Madrid) 1:37.370 (92.147 mph)
