= 2010 Jarama Superleague Formula round =

2010 Jarama Superleague Formula round Superleague Formula round Spain
- Circuit Map
- Date: June 20, 2010
- Location: Circuito del Jarama, Madrid, Spain
- Course: Permanent racing facility 2.115 mi (3.404 km)
- Laps: 33 & 33
Pole position
Team	(China) Beijing Guoan	John Martin
- Time: 1:21.329
Podium (1st race)
First	(China) Beijing Guoan	John Martin
Second	(Italy) A.C. Milan	Yelmer Buurman
Third	(Greece) Olympiacos CFP	Chris van der Drift
Fastest lap (1st race)
Team	(Italy) A.C. Milan	Yelmer Buurman
- Time: 1:20.945 (on lap 16)
Podium (2nd race)
First	(France) GD Bordeaux	Franck Montagny
Second	(Italy) A.S. Roma	Julien Jousse
Third	(England) Tottenham Hotspur	Craig Dolby
Fastest lap (2nd race)
Team	(Italy) A.S. Roma	Julien Jousse
- Time: 1:20.910 (on lap 15)

The 2010 Jarama Superleague Formula round was a Superleague Formula round held on June 20, 2010, at the Circuito del Jarama circuit, Madrid, Spain. It was the second year in a row that Superleague Formula visited the Jarama circuit, and was the first of two races in Spain for 2010. It was the fourth round of the 2010 Superleague Formula season.

Eighteen clubs took part including two Spanish clubs: Atlético Madrid and Sevilla FC.

Support races included the FIA GT3 European Championship.

== Results ==
=== Qualifying ===
- In each group, the top four qualify for the quarter-finals.

== Standings after the round ==
Pos	Team	Points
1	(England) Tottenham Hotspur	322
2	(Italy) A.C. Milan	263
3	(Switzerland) FC Basel 1893	239
4	(Belgium) R.S.C. Anderlecht	230
5	(Greece) Olympiacos CFP	211
