= AC Milan (Superleague Formula team) =

Italian racing team

AC Milan SF Racing Team
Founded	2008
Country	Italy
Driver(s)	Robert Doornbos (2008); Giorgio Pantano (2009); Yelmer Buurman (2010)
First race	2008 Donington
Last race	2010 Navarra
Rounds	24
Ch'ships	0
Total points	1252 (including Super Finals)
2010 position	5th (631 pts)
Races / Poles / Wins / Podiums / F. Laps; 47 / 1 / 5 / 12 / 4
NOTE - Data not including Super Finals

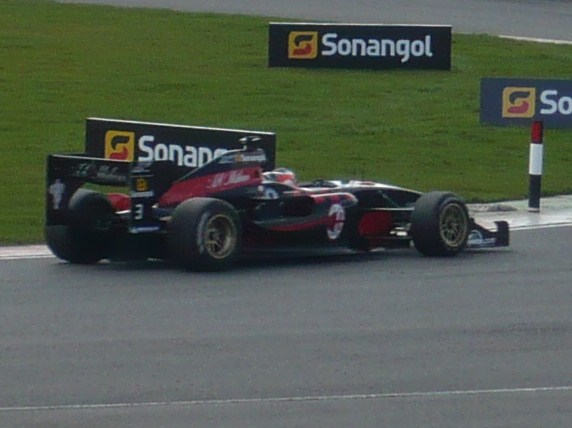
AC Milan car on track at Silverstone Circuit (2010)

AC Milan Superleague Formula team was a racing team representing Italian football club AC Milan in Superleague Formula.

== 2008 season ==
In the 2008 Superleague Formula season AC Milan hired the services of ex Formula One driver Robert Doornbos. Robert won 2 races and AC Milan finished 3rd overall in the standings. Doornbos did not return to the series in 2009. He now drives in the IndyCar Series.

== 2009 season ==
AC Milan returned for the 2009 Superleague Formula season with former Formula One racer and current GP2 Series champion Giorgio Pantano. In having Pantano as their driver, AC Milan are the first Superleague Formula team in history to have had two Formula One drivers to drive their car. In Giorgio's first round for AC Milan he had gearbox problems in qualifying, putting him 16th on grid for the first race. AC Milan won the 2nd race of the opening round of the season.

== 2010 season ==
Yelmer Buurman will be the driver of the ATECH Grand Prix run team for the 2010 season.

== Record ==
(key)

=== 2008 ===
Operator(s)	Driver(s)	1		2		3		4		5		6		Points	Rank
Operator(s)	Driver(s)	DON		NÜR		ZOL		EST		VAL		JER		Points	Rank
Scuderia Playteam	(Netherlands) Robert Doornbos	17	DN	1	6	18	4	2	2	2	17	1	10	335	3rd

=== 2009 ===
- Super Final results in 2009 did not count for points towards the main championship.

Operator(s)	Driver(s)	1			2			3			4			5			6			Points	Rank
Operator(s)	Driver(s)	MAG			ZOL			DON			EST			MOZ			JAR			Points	Rank
Azerti Motorsport	(Italy) Giorgio Pantano	12	1	2	5	11	–	4	17	X	6	6	6	15	11	–	3	14	X	286	7th

=== 2010 ===
Operator(s)	Driver(s)	1			2			3			4			5			6			7			8			9			10			NC			11			Points	Rank
Operator(s)	Driver(s)	SIL			ASS			MAG			JAR			NÜR			ZOL			BRH			ADR			POR			ORD			BEI			NAV			Points	Rank
Atech GP/Reid Motorsport	(Netherlands) Yelmer Buurman	2	16	X	5	7	3	1	7	1	2	10	3	1	8	3	4	5	5	4	12	4	11	4	X	10	16	X	6	7	4	7	3	C	7	12	X	631	5th
