= 2008 Vallelunga Superleague Formula round =

2008 Vallelunga Superleague Formula round Superleague Formula round Italy
- Circuit Map
- Date: November 2, 2008
- Location: ACI Vallelunga Circuit, Vallelunga, Italy
- Course: Permanent racing facility 2.538 mi (4.085 km)
- Laps: 32 & 30
Pole position
Team	(England) Liverpool F.C.	Adrián Vallés
- Time: 1:21.855
Podium (1st race)
First	(China) Beijing Guoan	Davide Rigon
Second	(Italy) A.C. Milan	Robert Doornbos
Third	(Turkey) Galatasaray S.K.	Alessandro Pier Guidi
Fastest lap (1st race)
Team	(China) Beijing Guoan	Davide Rigon
- Time: 1:23.586 (on lap 13)
Podium (2nd race)
First	(Portugal) F.C. Porto	Tristan Gommendy
Second	(Italy) A.S. Roma	Franck Perera
Third	(Netherlands) PSV Eindhoven	Yelmer Buurman
Fastest lap (2nd race)
Team	(Spain) Atlético Madrid	Andy Soucek
- Time: 1:23.475 (on lap 14)

The 2008 Vallelunga Superleague Formula round was the fifth round of the inaugural Superleague Formula championship, with the races taking place on November 2, 2008. Eighteen football teams were represented on the grid, the same number of teams as there was at the previous three rounds. There were two driver changes before this round of the championship and one during the round: Duncan Tappy returned to the Tottenham Hotspur cockpit replacing Dominik Jackson, having missed the previous round in Portugal and Kasper Andersen was replaced by Stamatis Katsimis in the Olympiacos CFP car. Having broken a bone in his right hand in practice, Paul Meijer was replaced by Dominick Muermans in the Al Ain car – becoming their fourth driver in five races. The meeting saw a third win for championship leaders Beijing Guoan and a first win for F.C. Porto. Beijing also extended their championship lead to an almost unassailable 59 points.

== Report ==
=== Qualifying ===
After the random draw which split the eighteen-car field into two groups, the fastest four qualifiers from each progressed into the knockout stages to decide places 1 to 8 on the grid. Andy Soucek (Atlético Madrid) missed out on the top eight, despite setting a time some 0.052 seconds faster than Group B 4th Adrián Vallés in the Liverpool F.C. car. As fastest drivers in their groups, Antônio Pizzonia (SC Corinthians) and Davide Rigon (Beijing Guoan) were expected to meet in the final, but neither made the final. Instead, Vallés and Robert Doornbos (A.C. Milan) battled it out, with Vallés coming out on top by 0.260 seconds – the fifth different polesitter in five races.

=== Race 1 ===
Before the race even began, there was dramas - Borja García (Sevilla FC) started from pit lane and Alessandro Pier Guidi (Galatasaray S.K.) having gearbox troubles on the grid. At the start, Vallés led away from Doornbos and Rigon, with Pier Guidi passing Tuka Rocha (CR Flamengo) for fourth on the opening lap. Lap three saw the end of Enrico Toccacelo's Borussia Dortmund car with suspension failure while running towards the back. The top ten somehow stayed in order, until the pit window. Rigon pitted first followed by Rocha, Franck Perera (A.S. Roma) and Yelmer Buurman (PSV Eindhoven. Doornbos and Vallés pitted on lap 11, allowing Pier Guidi to lead for two laps before his pit stop. Pizzonia took the lead for a lap until he pitted, and after the cycle through, Rigon led from Doornbos, Pier Guidi, Vallés and Rocha. Lap 16 saw Garcia's race end with a stuck throttle. There was a somewhat crazy finish to the race, with Soucek and Perera both retiring within the last five minutes of the race with engine problems and a puncture respectively. Vallés suffered fuel pressure problems towards the end, falling five places in as many minutes as Rigon went on to claim his third victory of the season, opening up a 67-point lead over PSV. Following him home were Doornbos, Pier Guidi, Rocha, Ryan Dalziel (Rangers F.C., Pizzonia, Craig Dolby (R.S.C. Anderlecht), Tristan Gommendy (F.C. Porto), Vallés, Buurman, Duncan Tappy (Tottenham Hotspur), Max Wissel (FC Basel 1893), Stamatis Katsimis (Olympiacos CFP) and Dominick Muermans (Al Ain) – both rookies finishing a lap down.

=== Race 2 ===
Race two began with a bang – a first corner incident taking out Pizzonia, Doornbos and Rocha at Curva Cimini, causing a long safety car period. Wissel retired the Basel car during this with engine trouble. All was cleared up for the restart on lap six with Toccacelo still leading from Soucek (up from third) and García. A brave move from Soucek at Campagnano moved the Spaniard into the lead with Perera passing García for third. Lap nine saw another accident, this time between Toccacelo and Perera again at Cimini. Toccacelo defended the inside line before moving sharply to the outside where Perera already was. Soucek pitted from the lead on lap eleven, but gremlins struck causing him to pit again, before retiring with gearbox trouble on lap 21. Katsimis led for a lap before he pitted, letting Tappy lead until his pitstop on lap 15. Perera took the lead, having pitted on lap eleven. A mistake from Buurman on lap 17 allowed Gommendy into second and after Perera. García retired again, with brake failure continuing Sevilla's spiral down the championship standings. The number of runners fell into single-figures on lap 27 with another three-car accident with Katsimis, Tappy and Pier Guidi crashing at Cimini. The race wasn't decided until the final lap when Perera made a slight mistake at Curva Soratte, allowing Gommendy through to win by 1.482 seconds from Perera, with Buurman, Vallés, Rigon, Dolby, Dalziel and Muermans completing the finishers. In the championship standings, Beijing had their lead cut to 59 points, which meant that a maximum of 42 points required for championship glory.

== Results ==
=== Qualifying ===
- In each group, the top four qualify for the quarter-finals.

==== Group A ====
Pos.	Team	Driver	Time
1	(Brazil) SC Corinthians	(Brazil) Antônio Pizzonia	1:21.847
2	(Italy) A.C. Milan	(Netherlands) Robert Doornbos	1:22.551
3	(Turkey) Galatasaray S.K.	(Italy) Alessandro Pier Guidi	1:22.684
4	(Italy) A.S. Roma	(France) Franck Perera	1:22.715
5	(Spain) Atlético Madrid	(Spain) Andy Soucek	1:22.833
6	(Netherlands) PSV Eindhoven	(Netherlands) Yelmer Buurman	1:23.229
7	(England) Tottenham Hotspur	(United Kingdom) Duncan Tappy	1:24.345
8	(Portugal) F.C. Porto	(France) Tristan Gommendy	1:24.516
9	(United Arab Emirates) Al Ain	(Netherlands) Paul Meijer	no time

==== Group B ====
Pos.	Team	Driver	Time
1	(China) Beijing Guoan	(Italy) Davide Rigon	1:22.322
2	(Brazil) CR Flamengo	(Brazil) Tuka Rocha	1:22.471
3	(Belgium) R.S.C. Anderlecht	(United Kingdom) Craig Dolby	1:22.874
4	(England) Liverpool F.C.	(Spain) Adrián Vallés	1:22.885
5	(Scotland) Rangers F.C.	(United Kingdom) Ryan Dalziel	1:23.498
6	(Switzerland) FC Basel 1893	(Germany) Max Wissel	1:23.664
7	(Spain) Sevilla FC	(Spain) Borja García	1:23.758
8	(Greece) Olympiacos CFP	(Greece) Stamatis Katsimis	1:24.661
9	(Germany) Borussia Dortmund	(Italy) Enrico Toccacelo	no time

==== Knockout stages ====
Quarter-Finals			Semi-Finals			Pole Shoot Out
A1	SC Corinthians	1:22.627
B4	Liverpool F.C.	1:22.411	B4	Liverpool F.C.	1:22.524
A3	Galatasaray S.K.	1:22.771	B2	CR Flamengo	1:30.310
B2	CR Flamengo	1:22.261				B4	Liverpool F.C.	1:21.855
A2	A.C. Milan	1:22.122				A2	A.C. Milan	1:22.115
B3	R.S.C. Anderlecht	1:22.645	A2	A.C. Milan	1:21.680
A4	A.S. Roma	1:21.998	B1	Beijing Guoan	1:22.373
B1	Beijing Guoan	1:21.836

==== Grid ====
Pos.	Team	Driver	Time
1	(England) Liverpool F.C.	(Spain) Adrián Vallés	1:21.855
2	(Italy) A.C. Milan	(Netherlands) Robert Doornbos	1:22.115
3	(China) Beijing Guoan	(Italy) Davide Rigon	1:22.373
4	(Brazil) CR Flamengo	(Brazil) Tuka Rocha	1:30.310
5	(Turkey) Galatasaray S.K.	(Italy) Alessandro Pier Guidi	1:22.771
6	(Belgium) R.S.C. Anderlecht	(United Kingdom) Craig Dolby	1:22.645
7	(Italy) A.S. Roma	(France) Franck Perera	1:21.998
8	(Brazil) SC Corinthians	(Brazil) Antônio Pizzonia	1:22.627
9	(Spain) Atlético Madrid	(Spain) Andy Soucek	1:22.833
10	(Scotland) Rangers F.C.	(United Kingdom) Ryan Dalziel	1:23.498
11	(Netherlands) PSV Eindhoven	(Netherlands) Yelmer Buurman	1:23.229
12	(Switzerland) FC Basel 1893	(Germany) Max Wissel	1:23.664
13	(England) Tottenham Hotspur	(United Kingdom) Duncan Tappy	1:24.345
14	(Spain) Sevilla FC	(Spain) Borja García	1:23.758
15	(Portugal) F.C. Porto	(France) Tristan Gommendy	1:24.516
16	(Greece) Olympiacos CFP	(Greece) Stamatis Katsimis	1:24.661
17	(Germany) Borussia Dortmund	(Italy) Enrico Toccacelo	no time
18	(United Arab Emirates) Al Ain	(Netherlands) Paul Meijer	no time

=== Race 1 ===
Pos	No	Team	Driver	Laps	Time/Retired	Grid	Pts.
1	12	(China) Beijing Guoan	(Italy) Davide Rigon	32	45:40.448	3	50
2	3	(Italy) A.C. Milan	(Netherlands) Robert Doornbos	32	+1.679	2	45
3	4	(Turkey) Galatasaray S.K.	(Italy) Alessandro Pier Guidi	32	+11.750	5	40
4	7	(Brazil) CR Flamengo	(Brazil) Tuka Rocha	32	+32.539	4	36
5	17	(Scotland) Rangers F.C.	(United Kingdom) Ryan Dalziel	32	+33.205	10	32
6	14	(Brazil) SC Corinthians	(Brazil) Antônio Pizzonia	32	+34.288	8	29
7	8	(Belgium) R.S.C. Anderlecht	(United Kingdom) Craig Dolby	32	+35.238	6	26
8	16	(Portugal) F.C. Porto	(France) Tristan Gommendy	32	+35.712	15	23
9	21	(England) Liverpool F.C.	(Spain) Adrián Vallés	32	+38.594	1	20
10	5	(Netherlands) PSV Eindhoven	(Netherlands) Yelmer Buurman	32	+43.216	11	18
11	19	(England) Tottenham Hotspur	(United Kingdom) Duncan Tappy	32	+59.987	13	16
12	10	(Switzerland) FC Basel 1893	(Germany) Max Wissel	32	+1:02.549	12	14
13	9	(Greece) Olympiacos CFP	(Greece) Stamatis Katsimis	31	+1 Lap	16	12
14	6	(United Arab Emirates) Al Ain	(Netherlands) Dominick Muermans	31	+1 Lap	18	10
15	22	(Italy) A.S. Roma	(France) Franck Perera	29	Puncture	7	8
16	15	(Spain) Atlético Madrid	(Spain) Andy Soucek	27	Engine	9	7
17	18	(Spain) Sevilla FC	(Spain) Borja García	15	Throttle	14	6
18	11	(Germany) Borussia Dortmund	(Italy) Enrico Toccacelo	2	Suspension	17	5
Fastest lap: Davide Rigon (Beijing Guoan) 1:23.586 (109.323 mph)

=== Race 2 ===
Pos	No	Team	Driver	Laps	Time/Retired	Grid	Pts.
1	16	(Portugal) F.C. Porto	(France) Tristan Gommendy	30	46:15.508	11	50
2	22	(Italy) A.S. Roma	(France) Franck Perera	30	+1.482	4	45
3	5	(Netherlands) PSV Eindhoven	(Netherlands) Yelmer Buurman	30	+4.562	9	40
4	21	(England) Liverpool F.C.	(Spain) Adrián Vallés	30	+13.321	10	36
5	12	(China) Beijing Guoan	(Italy) Davide Rigon	30	+14.126	18	32
6	8	(Belgium) R.S.C. Anderlecht	(United Kingdom) Craig Dolby	30	+25.284	12	29
7	17	(Scotland) Rangers F.C.	(United Kingdom) Ryan Dalziel	30	+30.185	14	26
8	6	(United Arab Emirates) Al Ain	(Netherlands) Dominick Muermans	30	+1:04.015	5	23
9	9	(Greece) Olympiacos CFP	(Greece) Stamatis Katsimis	26	Accident	6	20
10	19	(England) Tottenham Hotspur	(United Kingdom) Duncan Tappy	26	Accident	8	18
11	4	(Turkey) Galatasaray S.K.	(Italy) Alessandro Pier Guidi	26	Accident	16	16
12	15	(Spain) Atlético Madrid	(Spain) Andy Soucek	21	Gearbox	3	14
13	18	(Spain) Sevilla FC	(Spain) Borja García	18	Brakes	2	12
14	11	(Germany) Borussia Dortmund	(Italy) Enrico Toccacelo	8	Accident	1	10
15	10	(Switzerland) FC Basel 1893	(Germany) Max Wissel	3	Engine	7	8
16	14	(Brazil) SC Corinthians	(Brazil) Antônio Pizzonia	0	Accident	13	7
17	3	(Italy) A.C. Milan	(Netherlands) Robert Doornbos	0	Accident	17	6
18	7	(Brazil) CR Flamengo	(Brazil) Tuka Rocha	0	Accident	15	5
Fastest lap: Andy Soucek (Atlético Madrid) 1:23.475 (109.469 mph)
