= 2008 Estoril Superleague Formula round =

2008 Estoril Superleague Formula round Superleague Formula round Portugal
- Circuit Map
- Date: October 19, 2008
- Location: Autódromo do Estoril, Estoril, Portugal
- Course: Permanent racing facility 2.599 mi (4.183 km)
- Laps: 31 & 30
Pole position
Team	(Italy) A.S. Roma	Franck Perera
- Time: 1:26.368
Podium (1st race)
First	(England) Liverpool F.C.	Adrián Vallés
Second	(Italy) A.C. Milan	Robert Doornbos
Third	(Italy) A.S. Roma	Franck Perera
Fastest lap (1st race)
Team	(Spain) Atlético Madrid	Andy Soucek
- Time: 1:26.711 (on lap 14)
Podium (2nd race)
First	(United Arab Emirates) Al Ain	Paul Meijer
Second	(Italy) A.C. Milan	Robert Doornbos
Third	(Turkey) Galatasaray S.K.	Alessandro Pier Guidi
Fastest lap (2nd race)
Team	(Germany) Borussia Dortmund	Enrico Toccacelo
- Time: 1:28.491 (on lap 15)

The 2008 Estoril Superleague Formula round was the fourth round of the inaugural Superleague Formula championship, with the races taking place on October 19, 2008. Eighteen football teams were represented on the grid, the same number of teams as there was at the previous two rounds. There were four driver changes for this round of the championship: Franck Perera joined A.S. Roma replacing Enrico Toccacelo, with Toccacelo moving to the Borussia Dortmund car, replacing Paul Meijer as original driver Nelson Philippe was on GP2 Asia Series duty in Shanghai. Meijer also stayed in the series, moving to the Al Ain car, as both of their previous drivers Andreas Zuber (also in Shanghai) and Bertrand Baguette (in Barcelona for the final World Series by Renault round of the season) were unavailable. Just like Baguette, Duncan Tappy was unavailable to drive the Tottenham Hotspur car, and was replaced by Dominik Jackson. The meeting saw a second win for Liverpool F.C. and a first win for Al Ain. Beijing Guoan extended their championship lead to 35 points, thanks to a pair of fifths for Davide Rigon.

== Report ==
=== Qualifying ===
After the random draw which split the eighteen-car field into two groups, the fastest four qualifiers from each progressed into the knockout stages to decide places 1 to 8 on the grid. For the first time in Superleague Formula, the eight knockout qualifiers were the eight fastest drivers out of the two groups. As fastest drivers in their groups, Franck Perera (A.S. Roma) and Kasper Andersen (Olympiacos CFP) were expected to meet in the final, however Robert Doornbos' A.C. Milan machine knocked out the Dane in the semis. In the final itself, Perera recorded the fastest lap to become the fourth different polesitter in four races.

=== Race 1 ===
From the start, Perera led away from Doornbos, Adrián Vallés (Liverpool F.C.) and Tristan Gommendy (F.C. Porto), with Andersen being delayed from third on the grid. Lower down the field, tenth-placed Max Wissel (FC Basel 1893) collided with seventh-placed Enrico Toccacelo (Borussia Dortmund) collided at Curva 1, with Wissel retiring on the spot and Toccacelo retiring at the end of the lap, with front wing damage from the accident. It stayed that way until the mandatory stops, with Davide Rigon (Beijing Guoan) joining in on the fun also. Lap 10 saw Perera pitting with a four-second lead, closely followed by Vallés. A fumble by a rear tyre changer cost the French driver time and the place to Vallés. Doornbos came in to pit next time around with Rigon which put Gommendy into the lead, for home side Porto. He would lead for a couple of laps, before pitting which allowed Antônio Pizzonia (SC Corinthians) to lead for a lap. When all the stops cycled through, Liverpool led from Milan, Roma and Beijing with Pizzonia up to fifth. Pizzonia would pass Rigon for fourth towards the end of the race as the Italian was nursing an ailing car home with only fourth through sixth gears, and closed to a second behind Perera at the finish. Gommendy's strong run was ended by a water pump failure on lap 26, ruling that car out for the rest of the day. So, Vallés won his second Superleague race by 0.948 seconds from Doornbos, and then followed by Perera, Pizzonia, Rigon, Andy Soucek (Atlético Madrid), Alessandro Pier Guidi (Galatasaray S.K.), Borja García (Sevilla FC), Yelmer Buurman (PSV Eindhoven), Andersen, Tuka Rocha (CR Flamengo), Paul Meijer (Al Ain), Ryan Dalziel (Rangers F.C.), Craig Dolby (R.S.C. Anderlecht) and debutant Dominik Jackson rounding out the field for Tottenham Hotspur in 15th.

=== Race 2 ===
Rigon started from the pit lane, following a gearbox change after race one. From the start, polesitter Wissel led from Toccacelo and Jackson with action towards the back with Soucek's engine blowing. Jackson moved up to second, passing Toccacelo around the back of the circuit and closed up on Wissel down the front straight, and at Curva 1, Jackson would take the lead for a couple of laps. On lap 4, Toccacelo came up to the back of the Englishman's car, having already disposed of Wissel and did the same to Jackson. Towards the back, Perera and Vallés would collide at turn six, with Perera spinning into the gravel and retirement and Vallés retreating to the pits for a new nosecone. Dalziel also had a moment, and spun into retirement as well, with unrepairable accident damage. Out front, Toccacelo was establishing a healthy lead before his pit-stop on lap 14. Andersen then led for three laps before his pitstop, handing the lead back to Toccacelo, with Meijer now in tow, thanks to an early pitstop on lap 10. Wissel and Andersen would both retire in the late stages with mechanical problems and with three laps to go, gremlins would strike Toccacelo. Fading oil pressure switched the engine's ECU into safety mode, and was helpless in stopping Meijer through to the lead. After recording his first pole at Zolder, Meijer recorded his first win by nearly two seconds from Doornbos (up from 17th) with Pier Guidi, Pizzonia and Rigon further deposing Toccacelo before the flag. García, Buurman, Dolby, Rocha, Jackson and Vallés completed the finishers. Healthy finishes for Rigon allowed Beijing to head to the penultimate round at Vallelunga with a 35-point lead from PSV, with Liverpool now in third just a point further back. With a maximum of 200 points available, the championship is still wide open.

== Results ==
=== Qualifying ===
- In each group, the top four qualify for the quarter-finals.

==== Group A ====
Pos.	Team	Driver	Time
1	(Italy) A.S. Roma	(France) Franck Perera	1:25.881
2	(China) Beijing Guoan	(Italy) Davide Rigon	1:27.071
3	(Portugal) F.C. Porto	(France) Tristan Gommendy	1:27.105
4	(Germany) Borussia Dortmund	(Italy) Enrico Toccacelo	1:27.175
5	(Belgium) R.S.C. Anderlecht	(United Kingdom) Craig Dolby	1:27.303
6	(Spain) Atlético Madrid	(Spain) Andy Soucek	1:27.447
7	(Netherlands) PSV Eindhoven	(Netherlands) Yelmer Buurman	1:27.529
8	(Turkey) Galatasaray S.K.	(Italy) Alessandro Pier Guidi	1:27.733
9	(United Arab Emirates) Al Ain	(Netherlands) Paul Meijer	1:28.396

==== Group B ====
Pos.	Team	Driver	Time
1	(Greece) Olympiacos CFP	(Denmark) Kasper Andersen	1:26.761
2	(England) Liverpool F.C.	(Spain) Adrián Vallés	1:26.791
3	(Italy) A.C. Milan	(Netherlands) Robert Doornbos	1:26.866
4	(Brazil) SC Corinthians	(Brazil) Antônio Pizzonia	1:27.150
5	(Switzerland) FC Basel 1893	(Germany) Max Wissel	1:27.190
6	(Spain) Sevilla FC	(Spain) Borja García	1:27.249
7	(Scotland) Rangers F.C.	(United Kingdom) Ryan Dalziel	1:27.828
8	(Brazil) CR Flamengo	(Brazil) Tuka Rocha	1:28.072
9	(England) Tottenham Hotspur	(United Kingdom) Dominik Jackson	1:29.213

==== Knockout stages ====
Quarter-Finals			Semi-Finals			Pole Shoot Out
A1	A.S. Roma	1:26.469
B4	SC Corinthians	1:27.184	A1	A.S. Roma	1:25.670
A3	F.C. Porto	1:27.129	B2	Liverpool F.C.	1:25.726
B2	Liverpool F.C.	1:26.785				A1	A.S. Roma	1:26.368
A2	Beijing Guoan	1:26.294				B3	A.C. Milan	1:26.715
B3	A.C. Milan	1:26.020	B3	A.C. Milan	1:25.879
A4	Borussia Dortmund	1:27.653	B1	Olympiacos CFP	1:26.014
B1	Olympiacos CFP	1:26.373

==== Grid ====
Pos.	Team	Driver	Time
1	(Italy) A.S. Roma	(France) Franck Perera	1:26.368
2	(Italy) A.C. Milan	(Netherlands) Robert Doornbos	1:26.715
3	(Greece) Olympiacos CFP	(Denmark) Kasper Andersen	1:26.014
4	(England) Liverpool F.C.	(Spain) Adrián Vallés	1:25.726
5	(Portugal) F.C. Porto	(France) Tristan Gommendy	1:27.129
6	(China) Beijing Guoan	(Italy) Davide Rigon	1:26.294
7	(Germany) Borussia Dortmund	(Italy) Enrico Toccacelo	1:27.653
8	(Brazil) SC Corinthians	(Brazil) Antônio Pizzonia	1:27.184
9	(Belgium) R.S.C. Anderlecht	(United Kingdom) Craig Dolby	1:27.303
10	(Switzerland) FC Basel 1893	(Germany) Max Wissel	1:27.190
11	(Spain) Atlético Madrid	(Spain) Andy Soucek	1:27.447
12	(Spain) Sevilla FC	(Spain) Borja García	1:27.249
13	(Netherlands) PSV Eindhoven	(Netherlands) Yelmer Buurman	1:27.529
14	(Scotland) Rangers F.C.	(United Kingdom) Ryan Dalziel	1:27.828
15	(Turkey) Galatasaray S.K.	(Italy) Alessandro Pier Guidi	1:27.733
16	(Brazil) CR Flamengo	(Brazil) Tuka Rocha	1:28.072
17	(United Arab Emirates) Al Ain	(Netherlands) Paul Meijer	1:28.396
18	(England) Tottenham Hotspur	(United Kingdom) Dominik Jackson	1:29.213

=== Race 1 ===
Pos	No	Team	Driver	Laps	Time/Retired	Grid	Pts.
1	21	(England) Liverpool F.C.	(Spain) Adrián Vallés	31	46:44.582	4	50
2	3	(Italy) A.C. Milan	(Netherlands) Robert Doornbos	31	+0.948	2	45
3	22	(Italy) A.S. Roma	(France) Franck Perera	31	+2.067	1	40
4	14	(Brazil) SC Corinthians	(Brazil) Antônio Pizzonia	31	+3.108	8	36
5	12	(China) Beijing Guoan	(Italy) Davide Rigon	31	+8.918	6	32
6	15	(Spain) Atlético Madrid	(Spain) Andy Soucek	31	+9.243	11	29
7	4	(Turkey) Galatasaray S.K.	(Italy) Alessandro Pier Guidi	31	+20.472	15	26
8	18	(Spain) Sevilla FC	(Spain) Borja García	31	+37.745	12	23
9	5	(Netherlands) PSV Eindhoven	(Netherlands) Yelmer Buurman	31	+38.932	13	20
10	9	(Greece) Olympiacos CFP	(Denmark) Kasper Andersen	31	+41.163	3	18
11	7	(Brazil) CR Flamengo	(Brazil) Tuka Rocha	31	+1:14.376	16	16
12	6	(United Arab Emirates) Al Ain	(Netherlands) Paul Meijer	31	+1:14.914	17	14
13	17	(Scotland) Rangers F.C.	(United Kingdom) Ryan Dalziel	31	+1:29.690	14	12
14	8	(Belgium) R.S.C. Anderlecht	(United Kingdom) Craig Dolby	30	+1 Lap	9	10
15	19	(England) Tottenham Hotspur	(United Kingdom) Dominik Jackson	30	+1 Lap	18	8
16	16	(Portugal) F.C. Porto	(France) Tristan Gommendy	25	Water Pump	5	7
17	11	(Germany) Borussia Dortmund	(Italy) Enrico Toccacelo	1	Acc. Damage	7	6
18	10	(Switzerland) FC Basel 1893	(Germany) Max Wissel	0	Accident	10	5
Fastest lap: Andy Soucek (Atlético Madrid) 1:26.711 (107.886 mph)

=== Race 2 ===
Pos	No	Team	Driver	Laps	Time/Retired	Grid	Pts.
1	6	(United Arab Emirates) Al Ain	(Netherlands) Paul Meijer	30	45:59.268	7	50
2	3	(Italy) A.C. Milan	(Netherlands) Robert Doornbos	30	+1.859	17	45
3	4	(Turkey) Galatasaray S.K.	(Italy) Alessandro Pier Guidi	30	+5.447	12	40
4	14	(Brazil) SC Corinthians	(Brazil) Antônio Pizzonia	30	+5.749	15	36
5	12	(China) Beijing Guoan	(Italy) Davide Rigon	30	+15.566	14	32
6	11	(Germany) Borussia Dortmund	(Italy) Enrico Toccacelo	30	+17.757	2	29
7	18	(Spain) Sevilla FC	(Spain) Borja García	30	+21.363	11	26
8	5	(Netherlands) PSV Eindhoven	(Netherlands) Yelmer Buurman	30	+22.138	10	23
9	8	(Belgium) R.S.C. Anderlecht	(United Kingdom) Craig Dolby	30	+22.891	5	20
10	7	(Brazil) CR Flamengo	(Brazil) Tuka Rocha	30	+40.439	8	18
11	19	(England) Tottenham Hotspur	(United Kingdom) Dominik Jackson	30	+1:02.199	4	16
12	21	(England) Liverpool F.C.	(Spain) Adrián Vallés	29	+1 Lap	18	14
13	9	(Greece) Olympiacos CFP	(Denmark) Kasper Andersen	23	Stuck in gear	9	12
14	10	(Switzerland) FC Basel 1893	(Germany) Max Wissel	20	No Drive	1	10
15	17	(Scotland) Rangers F.C.	(United Kingdom) Ryan Dalziel	5	Acc. Damage	6	8
16	22	(Italy) A.S. Roma	(France) Franck Perera	4	Accident	16	7
17	15	(Spain) Atlético Madrid	(Spain) Andy Soucek	0	Engine	13	6
DNS	16	(Portugal) F.C. Porto	(France) Tristan Gommendy		Water Pump	3	0
Fastest lap: Enrico Toccacelo (Borussia Dortmund) 1:28.491 (105.715 mph)
