= 2009 Zolder Superleague Formula round =

2009 Zolder Superleague Formula round Superleague Formula round Belgium
- Circuit Map
- Date: 6 January, 2009
- Location: Circuit Zolder, Heusden-Zolder, Belgium
- Course: Permanent racing facility 2.492 mi (4.010 km)
- Laps: 29 & 29
Pole position
Team	(Denmark) FC Midtjylland	Kasper Andersen
- Time: 1:19.878
Podium (1st race)
First	(England) Tottenham Hotspur	Craig Dolby
Second	(Scotland) Rangers F.C.	John Martin
Third	(England) Liverpool F.C.	Adrián Vallés
Fastest lap (1st race)
Team	(Switzerland) FC Basel 1893	Max Wissel
- Time: 1:19.036 (on lap 17)
Podium (2nd race)
First	(United Arab Emirates) Al Ain	Esteban Guerrieri
Second	(Spain) Atlético Madrid	Ho-Pin Tung
Third	(England) Liverpool F.C.	Adrián Vallés
Fastest lap (2nd race)
Team	(England) Tottenham Hotspur	Craig Dolby
- Time: 1:20.655 (on lap 28)

The 2009 Zolder Superleague Formula round was the second round of the 2009 Superleague Formula season, with the races taking place on 6 January 2009. The main support series for the event was the EuroBOSS series. Other supporting events included the Youngtimer Touring Car Challenge, Formule Ford Benelux, Dutch Supercar Challenge and the Dunlop Endurance Cup.

== Report ==
=== Qualifying ===
FC Midtjylland (Kasper Andersen) claimed their first pole in the Superleague Formula in only their second competitive weekend in the series. They narrowly edged out Rangers F.C. (John Martin) to the pole position.

=== Race 2 ===
Race Two eventually got under way after a Safety Car start due to the rain and spray. Victims of the first racing lap were PSV Eindhoven (Dominick Muermans) who had a spin and CR Flamengo (Enrique Bernoldi) who ran over the back of Galatasaray S.K. (Duncan Tappy) ending both their races.

== Results ==
=== Qualifying ===
- In each group, the top four qualify for the quarter-finals.

==== Group A ====
Pos.	Team	Driver	Time
1	(Denmark) FC Midtjylland	(Denmark) Kasper Andersen	1:19.254
2	(Portugal) F.C. Porto	(France) Tristan Gommendy	1:19.548
3	(Switzerland) FC Basel 1893	(Germany) Max Wissel	1:19.685
4	(Portugal) Sporting CP	(Portugal) Pedro Petiz	1:19.934
5	(Belgium) RSC Anderlecht	(Netherlands) Yelmer Buurman	1:19.950
6	(Turkey) Galatasaray SK	(United Kingdom) Duncan Tappy	1:19.974
7	(Spain) Atlético Madrid	(China) Ho-Pin Tung	1:20.006
8	(Brazil) Flamengo	(Brazil) Enrique Bernoldi	1:20.344
9	(Netherlands) PSV Eindhoven	(Netherlands) Dominick Muermans	1:24.459

==== Group B ====
Pos.	Team	Driver	Time
1	(England) Liverpool F.C.	(Spain) Adrián Vallés	1:19.123
2	(England) Tottenham Hotspur	(United Kingdom) Craig Dolby	1:19.185
3	(Scotland) Rangers F.C.	(Australia) John Martin	1:19.253
4	(United Arab Emirates) Al Ain	(Argentina) Esteban Guerrieri	1:19.619
5	(Greece) Olympiacos CFP	(Italy) Davide Rigon	1:19.629
6	(Brazil) Corinthians	(Brazil) Antônio Pizzonia	1:19.663
7	(Italy) A.C. Milan	(Italy) Giorgio Pantano	1:20.341
8	(France) Olympique Lyonnais	(France) Nelson Panciatici	1:20.395
9	(Italy) A.S. Roma	(United Kingdom) Jonathan Kennard	1:21.815

==== Knockout stages ====
Quarter-Finals			Semi-Finals			Pole Shoot Out
B1	Liverpool F.C.	1:20.334
A4	Sporting CP	1:20.730	B1	Liverpool F.C.	1:20.847
B3	Rangers F.C.	1:21.523	B3	Rangers F.C.	1:19.829
A2	F.C. Porto	1:35.517				B3	Rangers F.C.	1:19.956
B2	Tottenham Hotspur	1:19.812				A1	FC Midtjylland	1:19.878
A3	FC Basel 1893	1:19.634	A3	FC Basel 1893	1:21.429
B4	Al Ain	1:21.134	A1	FC Midtjylland	1:20.371
A1	FC Midtjylland	1:20.822

==== Grid ====
Pos.	Team	Driver	Time
1	(Denmark) FC Midtjylland	(Denmark) Kasper Andersen	1:19.878
2	(Scotland) Rangers F.C.	(Australia) John Martin	1:19.956
3	(Switzerland) FC Basel 1893	(Germany) Max Wissel	1:21.429
4	(England) Liverpool F.C.	(Spain) Adrian Valles	1:20.847
5	(Portugal) F.C. Porto	(France) Tristan Gommendy	1:35.517
6	(England) Tottenham Hotspur	(United Kingdom) Craig Dolby	1:19.812
7	(United Arab Emirates) Al Ain	(Argentina) Esteban Guerrieri	1:21.134
8	(Portugal) Sporting CP	(Portugal) Pedro Petiz	1:20.730
9	(Belgium) R.S.C Anderlecht	(Netherlands) Yelmer Buurman	1:19.950
10	(Brazil) SC Corinthians	(Brazil) Antônio Pizzonia	1:19.663
11	(Turkey) Galatasaray S.K.	(United Kingdom) Duncan Tappy	1:19.974
12	(Italy) A.C. Milan	(Italy) Giorgio Pantano	1:20.341
13	(Spain) Atlético Madrid	(China) Ho-Pin Tung	1:20.006
14	(France) Olympique Lyonnais	(France) Nelson Panciatici	1:20.395
15	(Greece) Olympiacos CFP	(Italy) Davide Rigon	1:19.629
16	(Brazil) CR Flamengo	(Brazil) Enrique Bernoldi	1:20.344
17	(Italy) A.S. Roma	(United Kingdom) Jonathan Kennard	1:21.815
18	(Netherlands) PSV Eindhoven	(Netherlands) Dominick Muermans	1:24.459

=== Race 1 ===
Pos	No	Team	Driver	Laps	Time/Retired	Grid	Pts.
1	19	(England) Tottenham Hotspur	(United Kingdom) Craig Dolby	29	45:42.338	6	50
2	17	(Scotland) Rangers F.C.	(Australia) John Martin	29	+ 2.075	2	45
3	21	(England) Liverpool F.C.	(Spain) Adrian Valles	29	+ 3.412	4	40
4	10	(Switzerland) FC Basel 1893	(Germany) Max Wissel	29	+ 4.401	3	36
5	3	(Italy) A.C. Milan	(Italy) Giorgio Pantano	29	+ 4.738	12	32
6	6	(United Arab Emirates) Al Ain	(Argentina) Esteban Guerrieri	29	+ 7.059	7	29
7	7	(Brazil) CR Flamengo	(Brazil) Enrique Bernoldi	29	+ 9.575	16	26
8	8	(Belgium) RSC Anderlecht	(Netherlands) Yelmer Buurman	29	+ 10.769	9	23
9	4	(Turkey) Galatasaray S.K.	(United Kingdom) Duncan Tappy	29	+ 11.061	11	20
10	9	(Greece) Olympiacos CFP	(Italy) Davide Rigon	29	+ 11.766	15	18
11	22	(Italy) A.S. Roma	(United Kingdom) Jonathan Kennard	29	+ 12.650	17	16
12	16	(Portugal) F.C. Porto	(France) Tristan Gommendy	29	+ 13.190	5	14
13	24	(Denmark) FC Midtjylland	(Denmark) Kasper Andersen	19		1	12
14	69	(France) Olympique Lyonnais	(France) Nelson Panciatici	11		14	10
15	5	(Netherlands) PSV Eindhoven	(Netherlands) Dominick Muermans	6		18	8
16	2	(Portugal) Sporting CP	(Portugal) Pedro Petiz	0		8	7
17	14	(Brazil) SC Corinthians	(Brazil) Antônio Pizzonia	0		10	6
18	15	(Spain) Atlético Madrid	(China) Ho-Pin Tung	0		13	5
Fastest lap: Max Wissel (FC Basel 1893) 1:19.036 (113.52 mph)

=== Race 2 ===
Pos	No	Team	Driver	Laps	Time/Retired	Grid	Pts.
1	6	(United Arab Emirates) Al Ain	(Argentina) Esteban Guerrieri	29	46:34.726	13	50
2	15	(Spain) Atlético Madrid	(China) Ho-Pin Tung	29	+ 0.794	2	45
3	21	(England) Liverpool F.C.	(Spain) Adrian Valles	29	+ 8.732	16	40
4	9	(Greece) Olympiacos CFP	(Italy) Davide Rigon	29	+ 9.316	9	36
5	22	(Italy) A.S. Roma	(United Kingdom) Jonathan Kennard	29	+ 18.904	8	32
6	24	(Denmark) FC Midtjylland	(Denmark) Kasper Andersen	29	+ 23.504	6	29
7	16	(Portugal) F.C. Porto	(France) Tristan Gommendy	29	+ 24.675	7	26
8	10	(Switzerland) FC Basel 1893	(Germany) Max Wissel	29	+ 30.209	15	23
9	19	(England) Tottenham Hotspur	(United Kingdom) Craig Dolby	29	+ 36.869	18	20
10	69	(France) Olympique Lyonnais	(France) Nelson Panciatici	19		5	18
11	3	(Italy) A.C. Milan	(Italy) Giorgio Pantano	15		14	16
12	14	(Brazil) SC Corinthians	(Brazil) Antônio Pizzonia	14		1	14
13	2	(Portugal) Sporting CP	(Portugal) Pedro Petiz	9		3	12
14	8	(Belgium) R.S.C Anderlecht	(Netherlands) Yelmer Buurman	6		11	10
15	17	(Scotland) Rangers F.C.	(Australia) John Martin	4		17	8
16	4	(Turkey) Galatasaray S.K.	(United Kingdom) Duncan Tappy	3		10	7
17	5	(Netherlands) PSV Eindhoven	(Netherlands) Dominick Muermans	2		4	6
18	7	(Brazil) CR Flamengo	(Brazil) Enrique Bernoldi	2		12	5
Fastest lap: Craig Dolby (Tottenham Hotspur) 1:20.655 (111.24 mph)

== Standings after the round ==
Pos	Team	Points
1	(England) Liverpool F.C.	159
2	(United Arab Emirates) Al Ain	135
3	(England) Tottenham Hotspur	128
4	(Switzerland) FC Basel 1893	117
5	(Italy) A.C. Milan	112
