= Olympiacos CFP (Superleague Formula team) =

Greek racing team

Olympiacos CFP SF Racing Team
Founded	2008
Country	Greece
Driver(s)	Kasper Andersen (2008); Stamatis Katsimis (2008); Davide Rigon (2009); Esteban Guerrieri (2009); Chris van der Drift (2010); Ben Hanley (2010); Neel Jani (2010)
First race	2008 Donington
Last race	2010 Navarra
Rounds	24
Ch'ships	0
Total points	1114 (including Super Finals)
2010 position	4th (653 pts)
Races / Poles / Wins / Podiums / F. Laps; 48 / 3 / 5 / 12 / 3
NOTE - Data not including Super Finals

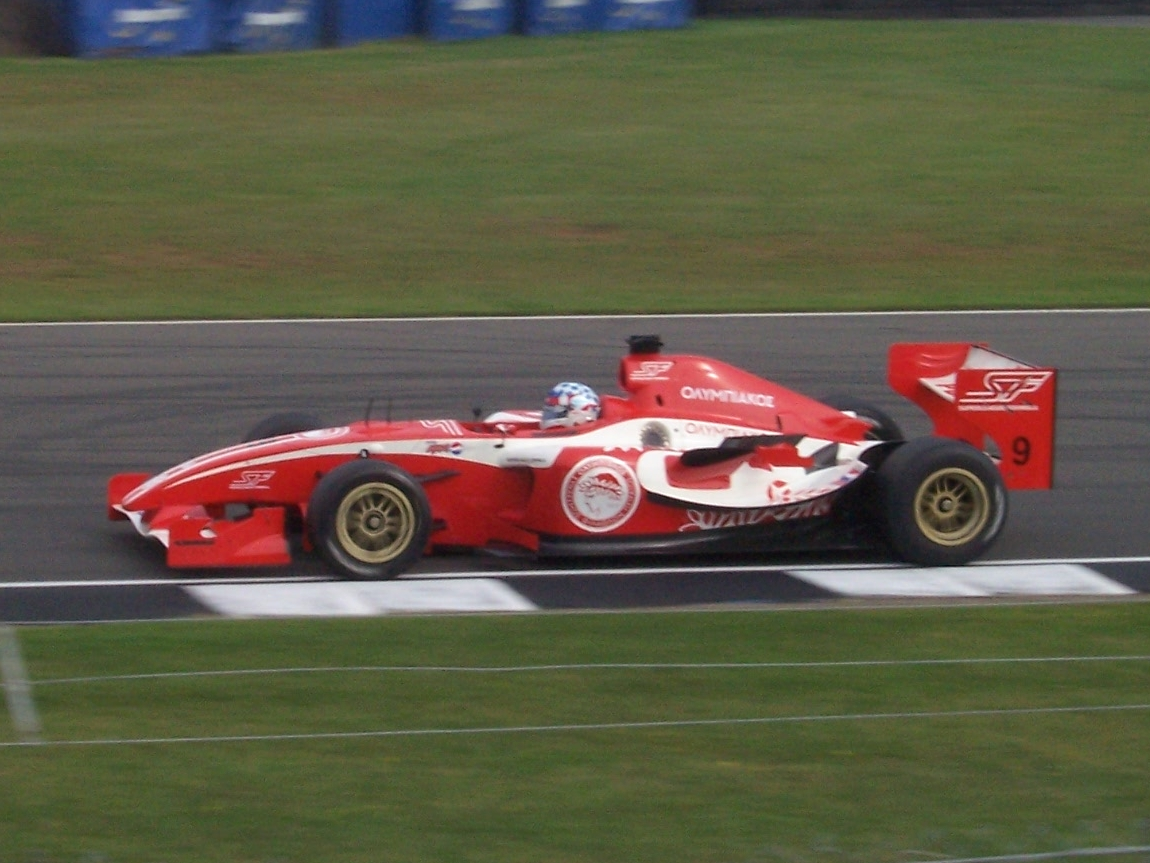
Kasper Andersen in the Olympiacos car

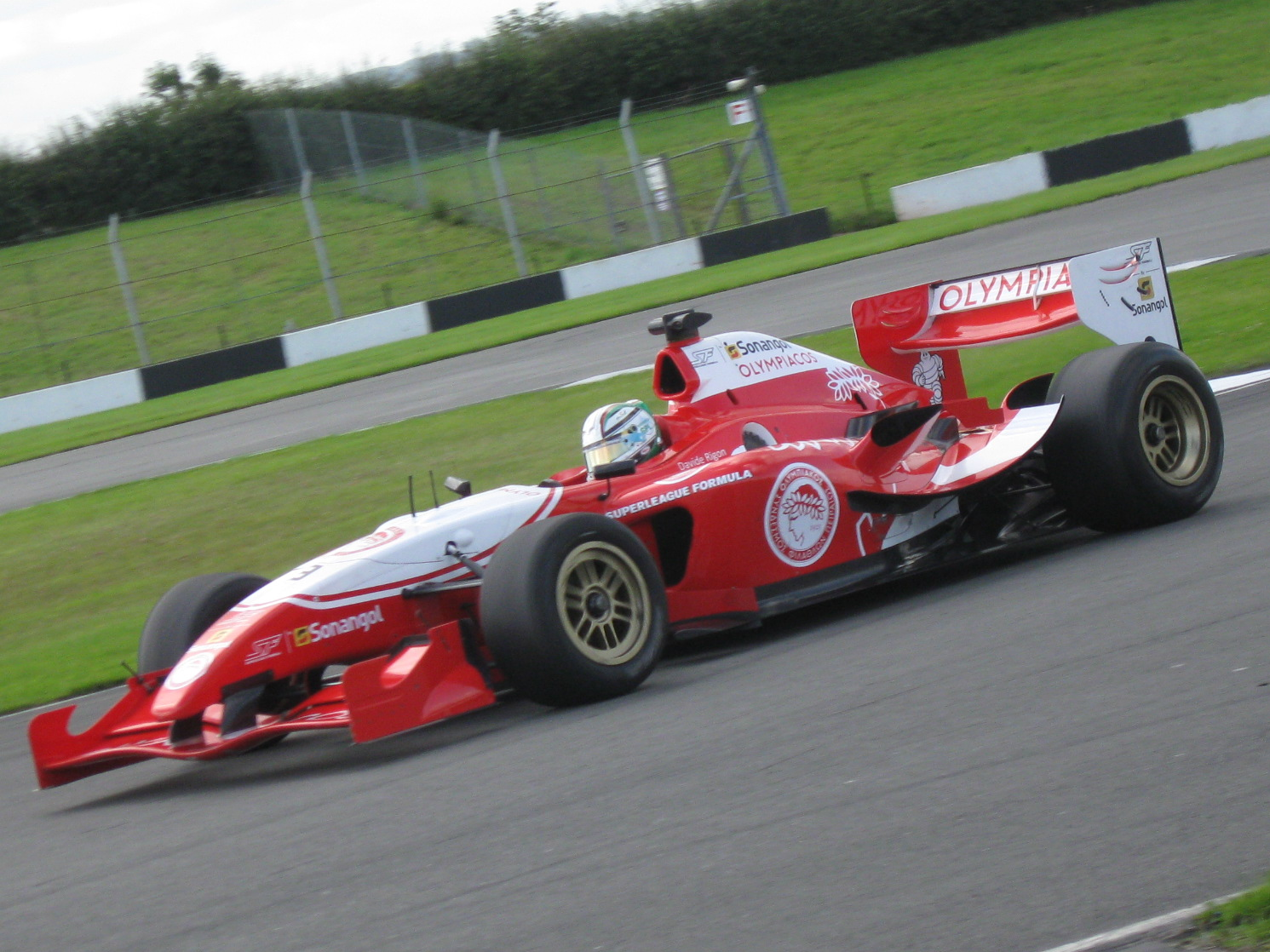
Davide Rigon in the Olympiacos car

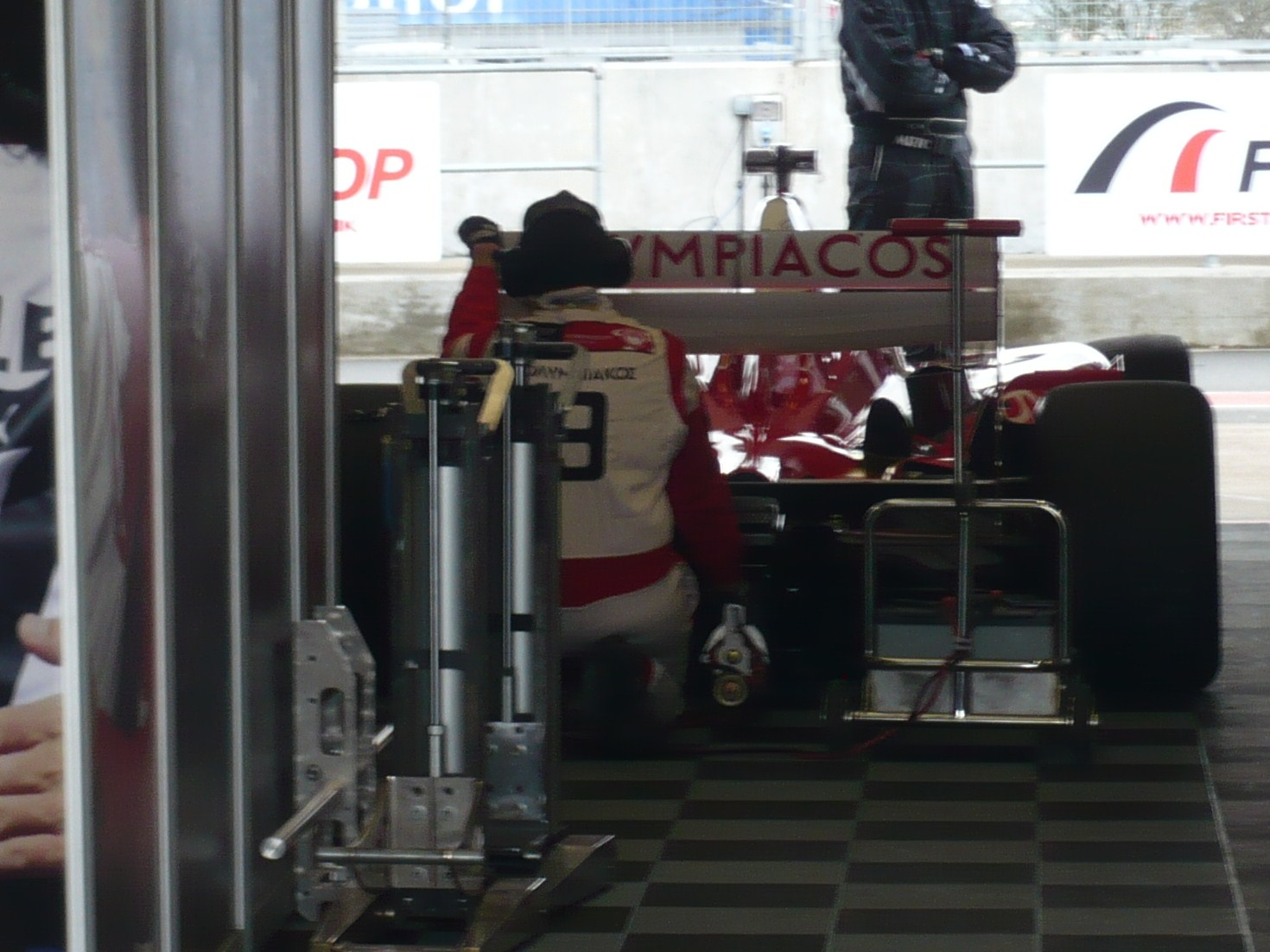
Olympiacos CFP car in the pitlane garage at Silverstone Circuit (2010)

Olympiacos CFP Superleague Formula team is the racing team of Olympiacos CFP, a major Greek multi-sport club, based in Piraeus, Greece. The Olympiacos CFP racing team competes in the Superleague Formula. It has been operated by GU-Racing International in both seasons.

== Record ==
(key)

=== 2008 ===
Operator(s)	Driver(s)	1		2		3		4		5		6		Points	Rank
Operator(s)	Driver(s)	DON		NÜR		ZOL		EST		VAL		JER		Points	Rank
GU-Racing International	(Denmark) Kasper Andersen	12	11	12	15	15	9	10	13					161	17th
GU-Racing International	(Greece) Stamatis Katsimis									13	9	13	16	161	17th

=== 2009 ===
- Super Final results in 2009 did not count for points towards the main championship.

Operator(s)	Driver(s)	1			2			3			4			5			6			Points	Rank
Operator(s)	Driver(s)	MAG			ZOL			DON			EST			MOZ			JAR			Points	Rank
GU-Racing International	(Italy) Davide Rigon	18	2	6	10	4	–	17	15	X										300	6th
GU-Racing International	(Argentina) Esteban Guerrieri										1	14	2	2	4	–	8	10	X	300	6th

=== 2010 ===
Operator(s)	Driver(s)	1			2			3			4			5			6			7			8			9			10			NC			11			Points	Rank
Operator(s)	Driver(s)	SIL			ASS			MAG			JAR			NÜR			ZOL			BRH			ADR			POR			ORD			BEI			NAV			Points	Rank
GU-Racing International	(New Zealand) Chris van der Drift	13	2	3	15	1	X	3	12	X	3	12	1	3	11	1	1	8	2	7	6	DN^{‡}																653	4th
GU-Racing International	(United Kingdom) Ben Hanley																						3	10	3				1	4	5	9	14	C	12	8	X	653	4th
GU-Racing International	(Switzerland) Neel Jani																									14	1	X										653	4th

^{‡} Chris van der Drift qualified for the Super Final at Brands Hatch but was unable to compete due to suffering injuries from a large crash in race two which led to him being taken to hospital with a broken ankle, two broken ribs, a cracked shoulder blade, a dislocated shoulder and two broken fingers. His Super Final place was taken up by the seventh highest points-scorer of the weekend, Yelmer Buurman.
