= 2010 Zolder Superleague Formula round =

Motor race in Belgium

2010 Zolder Superleague Formula round Superleague Formula round Belgium
- Circuit Map
- Date: July 18, 2010
- Location: Circuit Zolder, Heusden-Zolder, Belgium
- Course: Permanent racing facility 2.492 mi (4.010 km)
- Laps: 34 & 32
Pole position
Team	(Greece) Olympiacos CFP	Chris van der Drift
- Time: 1:18.721
Podium (1st race)
First	(Greece) Olympiacos CFP	Chris van der Drift
Second	(Belgium) R.S.C. Anderlecht	Davide Rigon
Third	(Brazil) SC Corinthians	Robert Doornbos
Fastest lap (1st race)
Team	(Belgium) R.S.C. Anderlecht	Davide Rigon
- Time: 1:18.806 (on lap 14)
Podium (2nd race)
First	(Italy) A.S. Roma	Julien Jousse
Second	(Brazil) CR Flamengo	Duncan Tappy
Third	(Turkey) Galatasaray S.K.	Tristan Gommendy
Fastest lap (2nd race)
Team	(Italy) A.C. Milan	Yelmer Buurman
- Time: 1:19.010 (on lap 25)

The 2010 Zolder Superleague Formula round was a Superleague Formula round held on July 18, 2010, at Circuit Zolder, Heusden-Zolder, Belgium. It was the third year in a row that Superleague Formula visited the Zolder circuit, making it the only circuit to feature on the calendar every year until 2010. It was the sixth round of the 2010 Superleague Formula season.

Seventeen clubs took part including Belgian club R.S.C. Anderlecht. Olympique Lyonnais skipped the round after parting company with driver Sébastien Bourdais.

Support races included the Dutch Supercar Challenge, BOSS GP, Benelux Formula Ford and the Historic Youngtimers Special Open.

== Results ==
=== Qualifying ===
- In each group, the top four qualify for the quarter-finals.

== Standings after the round ==
Pos	Team	Points
1	(Italy) A.C. Milan	410
2	(England) Tottenham Hotspur	402
3	(Belgium) R.S.C. Anderlecht	365
4	(Switzerland) FC Basel 1893	360
5	(Greece) Olympiacos CFP	351
