= 2008 Nürburgring Superleague Formula round =

2008 Nürburgring Superleague Formula round Superleague Formula round Germany
- Circuit Map
- Date: September 21, 2008
- Location: Nürburgring, Nürburg, Germany
- Course: Permanent racing facility 3.199 mi (5.148 km)
- Laps: 26 & 25
Pole position
Team	(Italy) A.C. Milan	Robert Doornbos
- Time: by default
Podium (1st race)
First	(Italy) A.C. Milan	Robert Doornbos
Second	(Belgium) R.S.C. Anderlecht	Craig Dolby
Third	(Turkey) Galatasaray S.K.	Alessandro Pier Guidi
Fastest lap (1st race)
Team	(Netherlands) PSV Eindhoven	Yelmer Buurman
- Time: 1:43.890 (on lap 14)
Podium (2nd race)
First	(Netherlands) PSV Eindhoven	Yelmer Buurman
Second	(Belgium) R.S.C. Anderlecht	Craig Dolby
Third	(China) Beijing Guoan	Davide Rigon
Fastest lap (2nd race)
Team	(Brazil) SC Corinthians	Antônio Pizzonia
- Time: 1:43.463 (on lap 13)

The 2008 Nürburgring Superleague Formula round was the second round of the inaugural Superleague Formula championship, with the races taking place on September 21, 2008. Eighteen football teams were represented on the grid, one more than at the opening round at Donington Park, with the introduction of the car representing Atlético Madrid driven by Andy Soucek. Other driver changes saw debuts for James Walker (replacing Ryan Dalziel in the Rangers F.C. car) and Antônio Pizzonia (replacing Soucek in the SC Corinthians car - with the Spaniard moving to the new Atlético Madrid car as mentioned above). The meeting saw wins for A.C. Milan and PSV Eindhoven, while Beijing Guoan extended their championship lead to 24 points.

== Report ==
=== Qualifying ===
After the random draw which split the eighteen-car field into two groups, the fastest four qualifiers from each progressed into the knockout stages to decide places 1 to 8 on the grid. For the second race in succession, two drivers missed out on places in the knockout stages, despite setting a faster time than the fourth-placed qualifier in the slower group. On this occasion, Group A was the faster group, and saw Olympiacos CFP (Kasper Andersen) and for the second time Borussia Dortmund (Nelson Philippe) miss out on qualifying for the knockout stages, despite recording a time nearly two tenths of a second faster than fourth-placed Group B qualifier CR Flamengo (Tuka Rocha). Having qualified fastest in their respective groups, FC Basel 1893 (Max Wissel) and A.C. Milan (Robert Doornbos) were expected to meet in the final, but Wissel was eliminated by Galatasaray S.K. (Alessandro Pier Guidi) in the semi-final stage, after the German didn't set a time. This semi-final was also the end of the Turkish side's participation in the session, as Pier Guidi had run out of fuel in his machine, thus handing Superleague's second pole to Milan by default.

=== Race 1 ===
The race began with a rolling start, just like at Donington but this race saw the introduction of pitstops to the Superleague fray. From the start, the A.C. Milan car of Robert Doornbos got a fantastic jump and would leave Alessandro Pier Guidi's Galatasaray S.K. car behind to battle with the cars of Antônio Pizzonia (SC Corinthians) and Craig Dolby (R.S.C. Anderlecht). Dolby held second for a few yards before Pizzonia took second into turn one. Pizzonia would close up rapidly to the back of Doornbos' car, nearly colliding at some points of the circuit and he led the chasers by a couple of seconds. Following them was the Borussia Dortmund car of Nelson Philippe and the FC Basel 1893 car of home driver Max Wissel. Philippe's stay in fifth was short-lived however, as an engine failure on lap three forced him to retire from the race and would not return to the track for the rest of the meeting. Doornbos began to pull away from his challengers by the time of the pitstops. For the pitstops, only two mechanics per wheel are allowed. Pier Guidi was the first to pit, removing his fairly well worn set of boots off the car, with Dolby, Doornbos and the others bar Pizzonia and Yelmer Buurman's PSV Eindhoven car pitting around half-distance. When Buurman did make his stop, he stalled as he was exiting losing valuable time. He would end up 10th, with the only consolation being a fastest lap of the race. Pizzonia had an equally fraught pitstop, losing half a minute with a stall and would go on to finish 7th. When all the dramas had calmed down, Doornbos held on to win by 6.631 seconds from Dolby with Pier Guidi capitalising on the errors by others to take the final podium spot. Debutant James Walker finished fourth for gers F.C. having started on row six, followed by championship leader Davide Rigon (Beijing Guoan), fellow Donington winner Borja García (Sevilla FC), Pizzonia, Tristan Gommendy's F.C. Porto machine, Wissel, Buurman and Andreas Zuber completed the finishers for Al Ain.

=== Race 2 ===
Following their first race retirement, A.S. Roma (Enrico Toccacelo) was on pole for the reverse grid race. Toccacelo led away, with the Liverpool F.C. car of Adrián Vallés tucking into second place behind the Italian, at the expense of Tuka Rocha in the CR Flamengo machine. His race would be concluded early along with Kasper Andersen (Olympiacos CFP) in a final-corner incident on lap one. Another first lap retiree was Duncan Tappy in Tottenham Hotspur's car having been hit by Zuber at the opening hairpin. Again, there was drama in the pitstops with race leader Toccacelo narrowly avoiding a stray wheel from the car of Walker. Walker would also cause the series' first safety car period when he spun in the Mercedes Arena. From the restart, Toccacelo led away from Buurman, Dolby and Rigon. However, a box of neutrals exiting the opening hairpin saw those three pass the unlucky Italian driver. It would finish in that order, with Buurman holding off Dolby by 0.611 seconds. Gommendy would finish 5th followed home by Doornbos, Pier Guidi, García, Andy Soucek (Atlético Madrid), Pizzonia and again, Zuber completed the finishers. In the championship, Beijing Guoan extended their lead to 24 points over PSV Eindhoven with Sevilla a further seven points behind.

== Results ==
=== Qualifying ===
- In each group, the top four qualify for the quarter-finals.

==== Group A ====
Pos.	Team	Driver	Time
1	(Switzerland) FC Basel 1893	(Germany) Max Wissel	1:42.652
2	(Brazil) SC Corinthians	(Brazil) Antônio Pizzonia	1:42.960
3	(Turkey) Galatasaray S.K.	(Italy) Alessandro Pier Guidi	1:43.363
4	(Portugal) F.C. Porto	(France) Tristan Gommendy	1:43.662
5	(Greece) Olympiacos CFP	(Denmark) Kasper Andersen	1:43.690
6	(Germany) Borussia Dortmund	(France) Nelson Philippe	1:43.718
7	(Scotland) Rangers F.C.	(United Kingdom) James Walker	1:44.214
8	(Spain) Atlético Madrid	(Spain) Andy Soucek	1:44.223
9	(Italy) A.S. Roma	(Italy) Enrico Toccacelo	1:45.601

==== Group B ====
Pos.	Team	Driver	Time
1	(Italy) A.C. Milan	(Netherlands) Robert Doornbos	1:42.920
2	(Belgium) R.S.C. Anderlecht	(United Kingdom) Craig Dolby	1:43.181
3	(England) Liverpool F.C.	(Spain) Adrián Vallés	1:43.320
4	(Brazil) CR Flamengo	(Brazil) Tuka Rocha	1:43.888
5	(Netherlands) PSV Eindhoven	(Netherlands) Yelmer Buurman	1:43.950
6	(England) Tottenham Hotspur	(United Kingdom) Duncan Tappy	1:43.987
7	(China) Beijing Guoan	(Italy) Davide Rigon	1:44.114
8	(United Arab Emirates) Al Ain	(United Arab Emirates) Andreas Zuber	1:44.185
9	(Spain) Sevilla FC	(Spain) Borja García	no time

==== Knockout stages ====
Quarter-Finals			Semi-Finals			Pole Shoot Out
A1	FC Basel 1893	1:42.481
B4	CR Flamengo	1:44.626	A1	FC Basel 1893	no time
A3	Galatasaray S.K.	1:42.726	A3	Galatasaray S.K.	1:43.482
B2	R.S.C. Anderlecht	1:43.239				A3	Galatasaray S.K.	no time
A2	SC Corinthians	1:42.207				B1	A.C. Milan	no time
B3	Liverpool F.C.	1:42.534	A2	SC Corinthians	1:42.637
A4	F.C. Porto	1:43.350	B1	A.C. Milan	1:42.457
B1	A.C. Milan	1:42.338

==== Grid ====
Pos.	Team	Driver	Time
1	(Italy) A.C. Milan	(Netherlands) Robert Doornbos	no time
2	(Turkey) Galatasaray S.K.	(Italy) Alessandro Pier Guidi	no time
3	(Brazil) SC Corinthians	(Brazil) Antônio Pizzonia	1:42.637
4	(Switzerland) FC Basel 1893	(Germany) Max Wissel	no time
5	(Belgium) R.S.C. Anderlecht	(United Kingdom) Craig Dolby	1:43.239
6	(England) Liverpool F.C.	(Spain) Adrián Vallés	1:42.534
7	(Portugal) F.C. Porto	(France) Tristan Gommendy	1:43.550
8	(Greece) Olympiacos CFP	(Denmark) Kasper Andersen	1:43.690
9	(Netherlands) PSV Eindhoven	(Netherlands) Yelmer Buurman	1:43.950
10	(Germany) Borussia Dortmund	(France) Nelson Philippe	1:43.718
11	(England) Tottenham Hotspur	(United Kingdom) Duncan Tappy	1:43.987
12	(Scotland) Rangers F.C.	(United Kingdom) James Walker	1:44.214
13	(China) Beijing Guoan	(Italy) Davide Rigon	1:44.114
14	(Spain) Atlético Madrid	(Spain) Andy Soucek	1:44.223
15	(United Arab Emirates) Al Ain	(United Arab Emirates) Andreas Zuber	1:44.185
16	(Italy) A.S. Roma	(Italy) Enrico Toccacelo	1:45.601
17	(Spain) Sevilla FC	(Spain) Borja García	no time
18*	(Brazil) CR Flamengo	(Brazil) Tuka Rocha	1:44.626

* - Flamengo were given a ten-place grid penalty for disobeying flags.

=== Race 1 ===
Pos	No	Team	Driver	Laps	Time/Retired	Grid	Pts.
1	3	(Italy) A.C. Milan	(Netherlands) Robert Doornbos	26	46:13.313	1	50
2	8	(Belgium) R.S.C. Anderlecht	(United Kingdom) Craig Dolby	26	+6.631	5	45
3	4	(Turkey) Galatasaray S.K.	(Italy) Alessandro Pier Guidi	26	+19.978	2	40
4	17	(Scotland) Rangers F.C.	(United Kingdom) James Walker	26	+23.002	12	36
5	12	(China) Beijing Guoan	(Italy) Davide Rigon	26	+29.603	13	32
6	18	(Spain) Sevilla FC	(Spain) Borja García	26	+30.140	17	29
7	14	(Brazil) SC Corinthians	(Brazil) Antônio Pizzonia	26	+34.028	3	26
8	16	(Portugal) F.C. Porto	(France) Tristan Gommendy	26	+42.546	7	23
9	10	(Switzerland) FC Basel 1893	(Germany) Max Wissel	26	+43.436	4	20
10	5	(Netherlands) PSV Eindhoven	(Netherlands) Yelmer Buurman	26	+53.033	9	18
11	6	(United Arab Emirates) Al Ain	(United Arab Emirates) Andreas Zuber	26	+53.541	15	16
12	9	(Greece) Olympiacos CFP	(Denmark) Kasper Andersen	20	Gearbox	8	14
13	19	(England) Tottenham Hotspur	(United Kingdom) Duncan Tappy	18	Accident	11	12
14	21	(England) Liverpool F.C.	(Spain) Adrián Vallés	7	Electrical	6	10
15	11	(Germany) Borussia Dortmund	(France) Nelson Philippe	3	Engine	10	8
16	7	(Brazil) CR Flamengo	(Brazil) Tuka Rocha	0	Accident	18	7
17	22	(Italy) A.S. Roma	(Italy) Enrico Toccacelo	0	Electrical	16	6
DNS	15	(Spain) Atlético Madrid	(Spain) Andy Soucek		Alternator	14	0
Fastest lap: Yelmer Buurman (PSV Eindhoven) 1:43.890 (110.846 mph)

=== Race 2 ===
Pos	No	Team	Driver	Laps	Time/Retired	Grid	Pts.
1	5	(Netherlands) PSV Eindhoven	(Netherlands) Yelmer Buurman	25	46:41.041	7	50
2	8	(Belgium) R.S.C. Anderlecht	(United Kingdom) Craig Dolby	25	+0.611	15	45
3	12	(China) Beijing Guoan	(Italy) Davide Rigon	25	+1.630	12	40
4	22	(Italy) A.S. Roma	(Italy) Enrico Toccacelo	25	+6.574	1	36
5	16	(Portugal) F.C. Porto	(France) Tristan Gommendy	25	+7.914	9	32
6	3	(Italy) A.C. Milan	(Netherlands) Robert Doornbos	25	+8.318	16	29
7	4	(Turkey) Galatasaray S.K.	(Italy) Alessandro Pier Guidi	25	+8.713	14	26
8	18	(Spain) Sevilla FC	(Spain) Borja García	25	+9.060	11	23
9	15	(Spain) Atlético Madrid	(Spain) Andy Soucek	25	+9.418	17	20
10	14	(Brazil) SC Corinthians	(Brazil) Antônio Pizzonia	25	+10.075	10	18
11	6	(United Arab Emirates) Al Ain	(United Arab Emirates) Andreas Zuber	24	+1 Lap	6	16
12	17	(Scotland) Rangers F.C.	(United Kingdom) James Walker	15	Spin	13	14
13	10	(Switzerland) FC Basel 1893	(Germany) Max Wissel	13	Throttle	8	12
14	21	(England) Liverpool F.C.	(Spain) Adrián Vallés	4	Electrical	3	10
15	9	(Greece) Olympiacos CFP	(Denmark) Kasper Andersen	2	Accident	5	8
16	7	(Brazil) CR Flamengo	(Brazil) Tuka Rocha	1	Accident	2	7
17	19	(England) Tottenham Hotspur	(United Kingdom) Duncan Tappy	1	Accident	4	6
DNS	11	(Germany) Borussia Dortmund	(France) Nelson Philippe		Engine		0
Fastest lap: Antônio Pizzonia (SC Corinthians) 1:43.463 (111.303 mph)
