= 2009 Estoril Superleague Formula round =

2009 Estoril Superleague Formula round Superleague Formula round Portugal
- Circuit Map
- Date: September 6, 2009
- Location: Autódromo do Estoril, Estoril, Portugal
- Course: Permanent racing facility 2.599 mi (4.183 km)
- Laps: 30 & 30
Pole position
Team	(Brazil) SC Corinthians	Antônio Pizzonia
- Time: 1:28.447
Podium (1st race)
First	(Greece) Olympiacos CFP	Esteban Guerrieri
Second	(England) Liverpool F.C.	Adrián Vallés
Third	(Brazil) SC Corinthians	Antônio Pizzonia
Fastest lap (1st race)
Team	(Belgium) R.S.C. Anderlecht	Yelmer Buurman
- Time: 1:29.162 (on lap 11)
Podium (2nd race)
First	(Portugal) F.C. Porto	Álvaro Parente
Second	(Spain) Sevilla FC	Sébastien Bourdais
Third	(Brazil) CR Flamengo	Enrique Bernoldi
Fastest lap (2nd race)
Team	(Switzerland) FC Basel 1893	Max Wissel
- Time: 1:29.190 (on lap 9)

The 2009 Estoril Superleague Formula round was the fourth round of the 2009 Superleague Formula season, with the races taking place on September 6, 2009.

== Report ==
=== Qualifying ===
SC Corinthians (Antônio Pizzonia) took his 3rd Superleague Formula pole of the season.

=== Race 1 ===
Polesitter SC Corinthians (Antônio Pizzonia) went too slowly at the start and got passed by Olympiacos CFP (Esteban Guerrieri). When the pitstops came around Liverpool F.C. (Adrián Vallés) passed the Olympiacos CFP car in the pitstops. During SC Corinthians pitstop the car left with the rear jack still attached to the car. Antônio Pizzonia managed to shake it off before getting back on track. Atlético Madrid (María de Villota) got into the side of F.C. Porto (Álvaro Parente) ending F.C. Portos race.

With 12 minutes to go Olympiacos CFP passed SC Corinthians to go into 2nd place and with 3 minutes on the clock remaining Olympiacos CFP passed Liverpool F.C. to get into 1st and get their first ever Superleague Formula win. Liverpool F.C. came 2nd and SC Corinthians finished 3rd.

== Results ==
=== Qualifying ===
- In each group, the top four qualify for the quarter-finals.

==== Group A ====
Pos.	Team	Driver	Time
1	(Greece) Olympiacos CFP	(Argentina) Esteban Guerrieri	1:29.191
2	(Scotland) Rangers F.C.	(Australia) John Martin	1:29.199
3	(England) Liverpool F.C.	(Spain) Adrián Vallés	1:29.213
4	(Switzerland) FC Basel 1893	(Germany) Max Wissel	1:29.382
5	(France) Olympique Lyonnais	(France) Nelson Panciatici	1:29.670
6	(Portugal) Sporting CP	(Portugal) Pedro Petiz	1:29.962
7	(Netherlands) PSV Eindhoven	(Netherlands) Carlo van Dam	1:30.715
8	(Turkey) Galatasaray S.K.	(China) Ho-Pin Tung	1:31.676
9	(Spain) Atlético Madrid	(Spain) María de Villota	1:32.457

==== Group B ====
Pos.	Team	Driver	Time
1	(Portugal) F.C. Porto	(Portugal) Álvaro Parente	1:28.235
2	(Belgium) R.S.C Anderlecht	(Netherlands) Yelmer Buurman	1:28.419
3	(Brazil) SC Corinthians	(Brazil) Antônio Pizzonia	1:28.541
4	(Italy) A.S. Roma	(France) Franck Perera	1:28.557
5	(Italy) A.C. Milan	(Italy) Giorgio Pantano	1:28.710
6	(Denmark) FC Midtjylland	(Denmark) Kasper Andersen	1:28.845
7	(England) Tottenham Hotspur	(United Kingdom) Craig Dolby	1:28.960
8	(Spain) Sevilla FC	(France) Sébastien Bourdais	1:29.005
9	(Brazil) CR Flamengo	(Brazil) Enrique Bernoldi	1:29.686

==== Knockout stages ====
Quarter-Finals			Semi-Finals			Pole Shoot Out
A1	Olympiacos CFP	1:29.122
B4	A.S. Roma	1:29.601	A1	Olympiacos CFP	1:28.438
A3	Liverpool F.C.	1:29.176	A3	Liverpool F.C.	1:29.334
B2	R.S.C. Anderlecht	1:29.548				A1	Olympiacos CFP	1:28.627
A2	Rangers F.C.	1:29.762				B3	SC Corinthians	1:28.447
B3	SC Corinthians	1:28.390	B3	SC Corinthians	1:29.106
A4	FC Basel 1893	1:28.800	A4	FC Basel 1893	1:29.553
B1	F.C. Porto	1:29.159

==== Grid ====
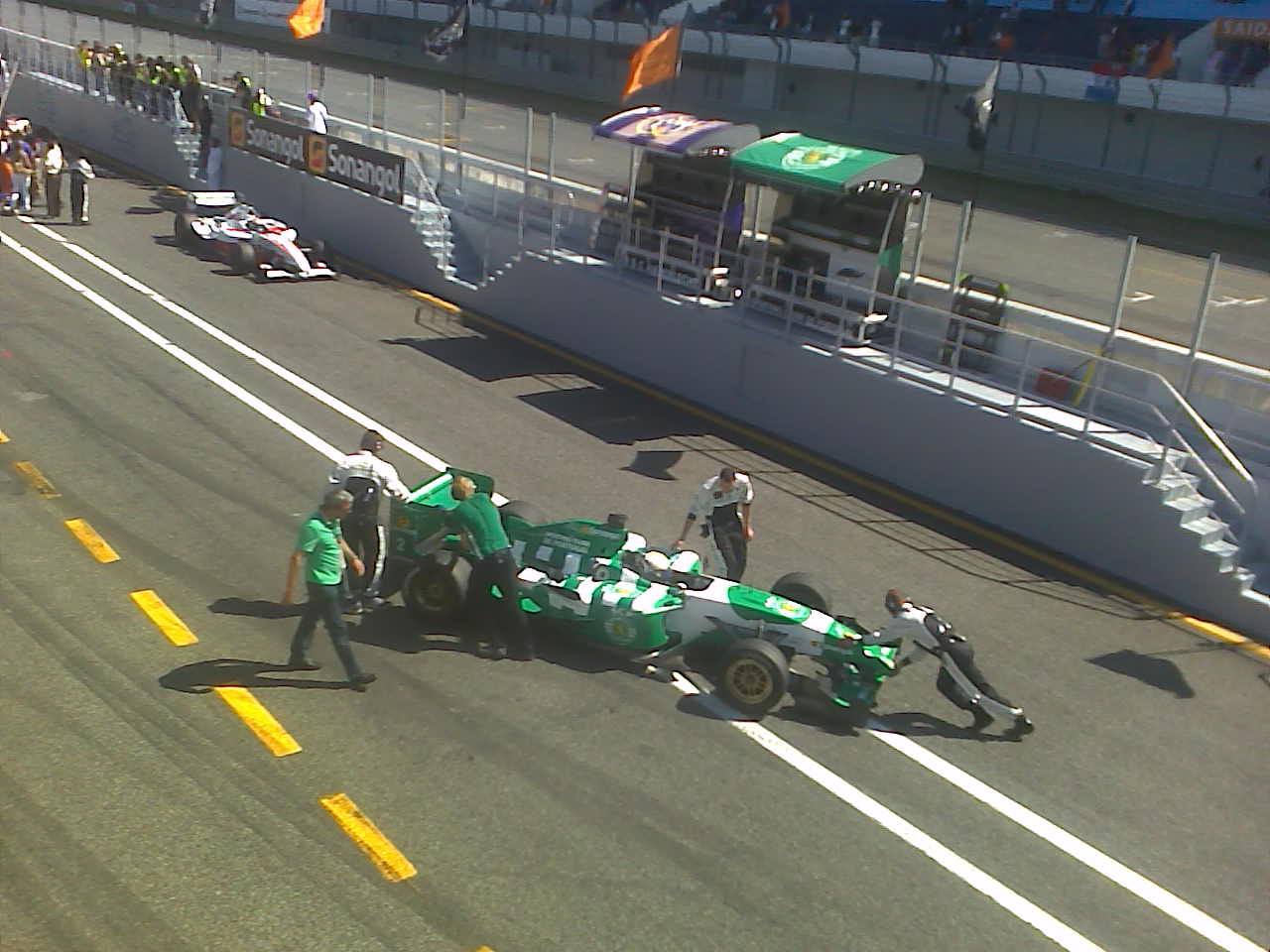
The Sporting CP car of Pedro Petiz being pushed from the pitlane

Pos.	Team	Driver	Time
1	(Brazil) SC Corinthians	(Brazil) Antônio Pizzonia	1:28.447
2	(Greece) Olympiacos CFP	(Argentina) Esteban Guerrieri	1:28.627
3	(England) Liverpool F.C.	(Spain) Adrián Vallés	1:29.334
4	(Switzerland) FC Basel 1893	(Germany) Max Wissel	1:29.553
5	(Scotland) Rangers F.C.	(Australia) John Martin	1:29.762
6	(Belgium) R.S.C. Anderlecht	(Netherlands) Yelmer Buurman	1:29.548
7	(Italy) A.S. Roma	(France) Franck Perera	1:29.601
8	(Portugal) F.C. Porto	(Portugal) Álvaro Parente	1:29.159
9	(Italy) A.C. Milan	(Italy) Giorgio Pantano	1:28.710
10	(France) Olympique Lyonnais	(France) Nelson Panciatici	1:29.670
11	(Denmark) FC Midtjylland	(Denmark) Kasper Andersen	1:28.845
12	(Portugal) Sporting CP	(Portugal) Pedro Petiz	1:29.962
13	(England) Tottenham Hotspur	(United Kingdom) Craig Dolby	1:28.960
14	(Netherlands) PSV Eindhoven	(Netherlands) Carlo van Dam	1:30.715
15	(Spain) Sevilla FC	(France) Sébastien Bourdais	1:29.005
16	(Turkey) Galatasaray S.K.	(China) Ho-Pin Tung	1:31.676
17	(Brazil) CR Flamengo	(Brazil) Enrique Bernoldi	1:29.686
18	(Spain) Atlético Madrid	(Spain) María de Villota	1:32.457

=== Race 1 ===
Pos	No	Team	Driver	Laps	Time/Retired	Grid	Pts.
1	9	(Greece) Olympiacos CFP	(Argentina) Esteban Guerrieri	30	45:47.271	2	50
2	21	(England) Liverpool F.C.	(Spain) Adrián Vallés	30	+ 2.166	3	45
3	14	(Brazil) SC Corinthians	(Brazil) Antônio Pizzonia	30	+ 3.010	1	40
4	8	(Belgium) R.S.C. Anderlecht	(Netherlands) Yelmer Buurman	30	+ 13.980	6	36
5	17	(Scotland) Rangers F.C.	(Australia) John Martin	30	+ 18.200	5	32
6	3	(Italy) A.C. Milan	(Italy) Giorgio Pantano	30	+ 28.787	9	29
7	22	(Italy) A.S. Roma	(France) Franck Perera	30	+ 31.158	7	26
8	19	(England) Tottenham Hotspur	(United Kingdom) Craig Dolby	30	+ 35.764	13	23
9	2	(Portugal) Sporting CP	(Portugal) Pedro Petiz	30	+ 1:00.995	12	20
10	5	(Netherlands) PSV Eindhoven	(Netherlands) Carlo van Dam	30	+ 1:21.104	14	18
11	18	(Spain) Sevilla FC	(France) Sébastien Bourdais	30	+ 1:22.390	15	16
12	69	(France) Olympique Lyonnais	(France) Nelson Panciatici	30	+ 2:25.470	10	14
13	7	(Brazil) CR Flamengo	(Brazil) Enrique Bernoldi	29	+ 1 lap	17	12
14	15	(Spain) Atlético Madrid	(Spain) María de Villota	29	+ 1 lap	18	10
15	24	(Denmark) FC Midtjylland	(Denmark) Kasper Andersen	28	Retired	11	8
16	16	(Portugal) F.C. Porto	(Portugal) Álvaro Parente	11	Retired	8	7
17	4	(Turkey) Galatasaray S.K.	(China) Ho-Pin Tung	8	Retired	16	6
DNS	10	(Switzerland) FC Basel 1893	(Germany) Max Wissel			4	0
Fastest lap: Yelmer Buurman (R.S.C Anderlecht) 1:29.162 (104.91 mph)

=== Race 2 ===
Pos	No	Team	Driver	Laps	Time/Retired	Grid	Pts.
1	16	(Portugal) F.C. Porto	(Portugal) Álvaro Parente	30	46:07.422	2	50
2	18	(Spain) Sevilla FC	(France) Sébastien Bourdais	30	+1.065	7	45
3	7	(Brazil) CR Flamengo	(Brazil) Enrique Bernoldi	30	+19.892	5	40
4	8	(Belgium) R.S.C. Anderlecht	(Netherlands) Yelmer Buurman	30	+ 20.373	14	36
5	14	(Brazil) SC Corinthians	(Brazil) Antônio Pizzonia	30	+ 20.747	15	32
6	3	(Italy) A.C. Milan	(Italy) Giorgio Pantano	30	+ 28.774	12	29
7	4	(Turkey) Galatasaray S.K.	(China) Ho-Pin Tung	30	+ 34.531	1	26
8	17	(Scotland) Rangers F.C.	(Australia) John Martin	30	+ 35.266	13	23
9	21	(England) Liverpool F.C.	(Spain) Adrián Vallés	30	+ 38.677	16	20
10	5	(Netherlands) PSV Eindhoven	(Netherlands) Carlo van Dam	30	+ 45.032	8	18
11	10	(Switzerland) FC Basel 1893	(Germany) Max Wissel	30	+ 1:00.641	18	16
12	12	(Italy) A.S. Roma	(France) Franck Perera	30	+ 1:35.981	11	14
13	15	(Spain) Atlético Madrid	(Spain) María de Villota	29	+ 1 lap	4	12
14	9	(Greece) Olympiacos CFP	(Argentina) Esteban Guerrieri	28	+ 2 laps	17	10
15	69	(France) Olympique Lyonnais	(France) Nelson Panciatici	28	+ 2 laps	6	8
16	24	(Denmark) FC Midtjylland	(Denmark) Kasper Andersen	6	Retired	3	7
17	2	(Portugal) Sporting CP	(Portugal) Pedro Petiz	3	Retired	9	6
18	19	(England) Tottenham Hotspur	(United Kingdom) Craig Dolby	1	Retired	10	5
Fastest lap: Max Wissel (FC Basel 1893) 1:29.190 (104.88 mph)

- FC Midtjylland started from the pitlane.

=== Super Final ===
Pos	No	Team	Driver	Laps	Time/Retired	Grid
1	18	(Spain) Sevilla FC	(France) Sébastien Bourdais	5	6:43.077	4
2	9	(Greece) Olympiacos CFP	(Argentina) Esteban Guerrieri	5	+ 1.270	5
3	21	(England) Liverpool F.C.	(Spain) Adrián Vallés	5	+ 5.584	3
4	8	(Belgium) R.S.C. Anderlecht	(Netherlands) Yelmer Buurman	5	+ 6.611	2
5	14	(Brazil) SC Corinthians	(Brazil) Antônio Pizzonia	4	+ 1 laps	1
6	3	(Italy) A.C. Milan	(Italy) Giorgio Pantano	3	+2 laps	6
Fastest lap: ????

== Standings after the round ==
Pos	Team	Points
1	(England) Liverpool F.C.	282
2	(England) Tottenham Hotspur	224
3	(Switzerland) FC Basel 1893	223
4	(Italy) A.C. Milan	212
5	(Brazil) SC Corinthians	211
