= 2024 Porsche Carrera Cup Benelux =

Motorsport season

The 2024 Porsche Carrera Cup Benelux was the 12th season of Porsche Carrera Cup Benelux. It began at Circuit de Spa-Francorchamps at 9 May and ended at Circuit Zolder on 13 October.

== Calendar ==
Round	Circuit	Date	Supporting
1	Circuit de Spa-Francorchamps, Stavelot, Belgium	9–11 May	FIA World Endurance Championship; Lamborghini Super Trofeo Europe
2	Circuit Zandvoort, Zandvoort, Netherlands	7–9 June	Deutsche Tourenwagen Masters; Formula Regional European Championship; ADAC GT Masters; Porsche Carrera Cup Germany
3	Autodromo Enzo e Dino Ferrari, Imola, Italy	5–7 July	European Le Mans Series; GT4 Italy Championship
4	TT Circuit Assen, Assen, Netherlands	2–4 August	BOSS GP Series; Supercar Challenge
5	Red Bull Ring, Spielberg, Austria	13–15 September	International GT Open; Formula Regional European Championship; Euroformula Open Championship; Euro 4 Championship
6	Circuit Zolder, Heusden-Zolder, Belgium	11–13 October	NASCAR Whelen Euro Series; Belcar Endurance Championship

== Entry list ==
Team	No.	Driver	Class	Rounds
(Belgium) Speedlover	2	(Belgium) Maxime Bertho	PA	1
(Netherlands) PG Motorsport	3	(Netherlands) Ziad Geris	PA	All
(Netherlands) PG Motorsport	30	(Belgium) Wouter Boerekamps	P	4
(Netherlands) PG Motorsport	98	(Netherlands) Nick Ho	R	All
(Belgium) JW Raceservice	4	(Netherlands) Jurriaan de Back	R	All
(Belgium) JW Raceservice	21	(Netherlands) Sacha Norden	P	All
(Belgium) JW Raceservice	33	(Netherlands) Larry ten Voorde	P	4
(Netherlands) Team GP Elite	5	(Lithuania) Domas Raudonis	R	All
(Netherlands) Team GP Elite	8	(Netherlands) Niels Troost	PA	2
(Netherlands) Team GP Elite	12	(Germany) Maik Rosenburg	PA	All
(Netherlands) Hans Weijs Motorsport	7	(Netherlands) Paul Meijer	P	All
(Netherlands) Hans Weijs Motorsport	36	(Netherlands) Ralph Poppelaars	PA	1–2
(Netherlands) Hans Weijs Motorsport	37	(Netherlands) Hans Weijs Jr.	PA	4
(Belgium) Q1-trackracing	10	(Netherlands) Niels Langeveld	P	All
(Belgium) Q1-trackracing	34	(Netherlands) Dirk Schouten	P	All
(Belgium) Q1-trackracing	121	(Latvia) Valters Aigars Zviedris	R	1–5
(Belgium) RedAnt Racing	17	(Belgium) Dréke Janssen	R	All
(Belgium) RedAnt Racing	69	(Finland) Kalle Rovanperä	P	2–3, 5–6
(Belgium) D’ieteren Luxury Performance	22	(Belgium) Kobe Pauwels	R	All
(Belgium) D’ieteren Luxury Performance	92	(Belgium) Benjamin Paque	P	All
(Belgium) MM Racing	23	(Belgium) Steve Meurrens	R	6
(Belgium) NGT Racing	32	(Sweden) Robin Knutsson	P	1–4
(Finland) 39 Racing	39	(Finland) Jani Käkelä	PA	All
(Estonia) EST1 Racing	47	(Estonia) Alexander Reimann	R	All
Porsche Estonia	48	(Estonia) Thomas Kangro	R	All
(Netherlands) Bas Koeten Racing	55	(Germany) Colin Bönighausen	R	2, 4, 6
(Germany) CarTech Motorsport	55	(Germany) Colin Bönighausen	R	1
(Netherlands) Team RaceArt	65	(Netherlands) Sam Jongejan	R	All
(Netherlands) Team RaceArt	77	(Netherlands) Jules Grouwels	PA	All

Icon	Class
P	Pro Cup
R	Rookie
PA	Pro-Am Cup
	Guest Starter

== Race results ==
Round		Circuit	Pole position	Fastest lap	Overall winner	Winning team	Pro-Am winner	Rookie winner
1	R1	(Belgium) Circuit de Spa-Francorchamps	(Belgium) Benjamin Paque	(Netherlands) Sam Jongejan	(Belgium) Benjamin Paque	(Belgium) D’ieteren Luxury Performance	(Finland) Jani Käkelä	(Netherlands) Sam Jongejan
1	R2	(Belgium) Circuit de Spa-Francorchamps	(Netherlands) Paul Meijer	(Netherlands) Dirk Schouten	(Netherlands) Dirk Schouten	(Belgium) Q1-trackracing	(Netherlands) Jules Grouwels	(Belgium) Kobe Pauwels
2	R1	(Netherlands) Circuit Zandvoort	(Netherlands) Niels Langeveld	(Finland) Kalle Rovanperä	(Netherlands) Dirk Schouten	(Belgium) Q1-trackracing	(Netherlands) Jules Grouwels	(Germany) Colin Bönighausen
2	R2	(Netherlands) Circuit Zandvoort	(Netherlands) Dirk Schouten	(Belgium) Benjamin Paque	(Belgium) Benjamin Paque	(Belgium) D’ieteren Luxury Performance	(Netherlands) Niels Troost	(Belgium) Kobe Pauwels
3	R1	(Italy) Autodromo Enzo e Dino Ferrari	(Finland) Kalle Rovanperä	(Netherlands) Paul Meijer	(Netherlands) Paul Meijer	(Netherlands) Hans Weijs Motorsport	(Finland) Jani Käkelä	(Netherlands) Sam Jongejan
3	R2	(Italy) Autodromo Enzo e Dino Ferrari	(Finland) Kalle Rovanperä	(Finland) Kalle Rovanperä	(Finland) Kalle Rovanperä	(Belgium) RedAnt Racing	(Finland) Jani Käkelä	(Belgium) Kobe Pauwels
4	R1	(Netherlands) TT Circuit Assen	(Netherlands) Sam Jongejan	(Netherlands) Larry ten Voorde	(Netherlands) Larry ten Voorde	(Belgium) JW Raceservice	(Netherlands) Hans Weijs Jr.	(Netherlands) Sam Jongejan
4	R2	(Netherlands) TT Circuit Assen	(Netherlands) Paul Meijer	(Netherlands) Larry ten Voorde	(Netherlands) Larry ten Voorde	(Belgium) JW Raceservice	(Netherlands) Jules Grouwels	(Belgium) Kobe Pauwels
5	R1	(Austria) Red Bull Ring	(Belgium) Benjamin Paque	(Finland) Kalle Rovanperä	(Finland) Kalle Rovanperä	(Belgium) RedAnt Racing	(Finland) Jani Käkelä	(Belgium) Dréke Janssen
5	R2	(Austria) Red Bull Ring	(Belgium) Benjamin Paque	(Netherlands) Sam Jongejan	(Netherlands) Sacha Norden	(Belgium) JW Raceservice	(Finland) Jani Käkelä	(Belgium) Dréke Janssen
6	R1	(Belgium) Circuit Zolder	(Finland) Kalle Rovanperä	(Netherlands) Sacha Norden	(Netherlands) Paul Meijer	(Netherlands) Hans Weijs Motorsport	(Netherlands) Jules Grouwels	(Netherlands) Sam Jongejan
6	R2	(Belgium) Circuit Zolder	(Netherlands) Sacha Norden	(Finland) Kalle Rovanperä	(Finland) Kalle Rovanperä	(Belgium) RedAnt Racing	(Netherlands) Jules Grouwels	(Lithuania) Domas Raudonis

== Championship standings ==
=== Scoring system ===
Position	**1st**	**2nd**	**3rd**	**4th**	**5th**	**6th**	**7th**	**8th**	**9th**	**10th**	**11th**	**12th**	**13th**	**14th**	**15th**	**Pole (R1)**
Points	25	20	16	13	11	10	9	8	7	6	5	4	3	2	1	1

=== Overall ===
Pos.	Driver	Team	(Belgium) SPA		(Netherlands) ZAN		(Italy) IMO		(Netherlands) ASS		(Austria) RBR		(Belgium) ZOL		Points
1	(Netherlands) Dirk Schouten	(Belgium) Q1-trackracing	10	1	1	**2**	18	5	4	2	4	2	5	3	186.5
2	(Netherlands) Paul Meijer	(Netherlands) Hans Weijs Motorsport	9	**2**	5	3	1	2	6	**8**	6	7	1	2	183
3	(Belgium) Benjamin Paque	(Belgium) D’ieteren Luxury Performance	**1**	Ret	10	1	4	3	8	11	**10**	**3**	7	5	145
4	(Finland) Kalle Rovanperä	(Belgium) RedAnt Racing			4	5	**2**	**1**			1	6	**3**	1	134.5
5	(Netherlands) Sacha Norden	(Belgium) JW Raceservice	6	4	7	4	6	7	7	16	8	1	2	**Ret**	128
6	(Netherlands) Sam Jongejan	(Netherlands) Team RaceArt	2	Ret	9	8	5	9	**2**	5	5	16	4	9	120.5
7	(Netherlands) Niels Langeveld	(Belgium) Q1-trackracing	11	5	**2**	16	8	8	11	3	2	12	8	7	116
8	(Belgium) Kobe Pauwels	(Belgium) D’ieteren Luxury Performance	5	6	8	6	7	6	9	4	9	5	10	10	112.5
9	(Lithuania) Domas Raudonis	(Netherlands) Team GP Elite	13	10	Ret	14	10	11	5	9	18	9	6	4	82
10	(Sweden) Robin Knutsson	(Belgium) NGT Racing	3	3	3	Ret	3	4	16	Ret					81
11	(Belgium) Dréke Janssen	(Belgium) RedAnt Racing	WD	WD	12	9	Ret	10	15	22	3	4	13	12	54
12	(Estonia) Alexander Reimann	(Estonia) EST1 Racing	12	9	14	10	9	13	Ret	20	7	14	12	11	50.5
13	(Netherlands) Jurriaan de Back	(Belgium) JW Raceservice	16	8	11	11	13	16	12	13	16	8	15	15	50
14	(Netherlands) Nick Ho	(Netherlands) PG Motorsport	8	11	Ret	18	12	12	Ret	10	12	18	14	8	46
15	(Latvia) Valters Aigars Zviedris	(Belgium) Q1-trackracing	4	14	13	15	11	15	13	12	11	17			44.5
16	(Netherlands) Jules Grouwels	(Netherlands) Team RaceArt	15	12	15	13	16	20	Ret	14	17	13	16	14	26
17	(Estonia) Thomas Kangro	Porsche Estonia	20	13	Ret	19	Ret	14	19	21	13	11	11	13	23.5
18	(Finland) Jani Käkelä	(Finland) 39 Racing	14	15	16	17	14	17	Ret	15	14	10	17	16	21
19	(Germany) Maik Rosenburg	(Netherlands) Team GP Elite	17	Ret	Ret	20	15	18	18	18	15	Ret	18	18	5.5
20	(Netherlands) Ziad Geris	(Netherlands) PG Motorsport	18	Ret	18	22	17	19	17	19	19	15	19	17	5
21	(Netherlands) Ralph Poppelaars	(Netherlands) Hans Weijs Motorsport	19	Ret	17	21									0
Guest drivers ineligible to score points
–	(Netherlands) Larry ten Voorde	(Belgium) JW Raceservice							1	1					–
–	(Belgium) Wouter Boerekamps	(Netherlands) PG Motorsport							3	7					–
–	(Germany) Colin Bönighausen	(Germany) CarTech Motorsport	7	7											–
–	(Germany) Colin Bönighausen	(Netherlands) Bas Koeten Racing			6	7			10	6			9	6	–
–	(Netherlands) Niels Troost	(Netherlands) Team GP Elite			Ret	12									–
–	(Netherlands) Hans Weijs Jr.	(Netherlands) Hans Weijs Motorsport							14	17					–
–	(Belgium) Maxime Bertho	(Belgium) Speedlover	Ret	16											–
–	(Belgium) Steve Meurrens	(Belgium) MM Racing											20	19	–
Pos.	Driver	Team	(Belgium) SPA		(Netherlands) ZAN		(Italy) IMO		(Netherlands) ASS		(Austria) RBR		(Belgium) ZOL		Points

Colour	Result
Gold	Winner
Silver	Second place
Bronze	Third place
Green	Points classification
Blue	Non-points classification
Blue	Non-classified finish (NC)
Purple	Retired, not classified (Ret)
Red	Did not qualify (DNQ)
Red	Did not pre-qualify (DNPQ)
Black	Disqualified (DSQ)
White	Did not start (DNS)
White	Withdrew (WD)
White	Race cancelled (C)
Blank	Did not practice (DNP)
Blank	Did not arrive (DNA)
Blank	Excluded (EX)

**Bold** – Pole
Italics – Fastest Lap
† — Did not finish, but classified

=== Pro-Am ===
Pos.	Driver	Team	(Belgium) SPA		(Netherlands) ZAN		(Italy) IMO		(Netherlands) ASS		(Austria) RBR		(Belgium) ZOL		Points
1	(Finland) Jani Käkelä	(Finland) 39 Racing	**1**	2	2	3	1	1	Ret	2	**1**	**1**	**2**	2	234.5
2	(Netherlands) Jules Grouwels	(Netherlands) Team RaceArt	2	1	1	2	**3**	**4**	Ret	1	3	2	1	1	231
3	(Netherlands) Ziad Geris	(Netherlands) PG Motorsport	4	Ret	4	6	4	3	2	5	4	3	4	**3**	155.5
4	(Germany) Maik Rosenburg	(Netherlands) Team GP Elite	3	**Ret**	Ret	4	2	2	3	4	2	Ret	3	4	147
5	(Netherlands) Ralph Poppelaars	(Netherlands) Hans Weijs Motorsport	5	Ret	3	5									39
Guest drivers ineligible to score points
–	(Belgium) Maxime Bertho	(Belgium) Speedlover	Ret	3											–
–	(Netherlands) Niels Troost	(Netherlands) Team GP Elite			**Ret** (Note: Even though Troost scored pole position in Pro-Am for Race 1 at Zandvoort, Grouwels got the point for it.)	**1**									–
–	(Netherlands) Hans Weijs Jr.	(Netherlands) Hans Weijs Motorsport							**1** (Note: Even though Weijs Jr. scored pole position in Pro-Am for Race 1 at Assen, Grouwels got the point for it.)	**3**					–
Pos.	Driver	Team	(Belgium) SPA		(Netherlands) ZAN		(Italy) IMO		(Netherlands) ASS		(Austria) RBR		(Belgium) ZOL		Points

=== Rookie ===
Pos.	Driver	Team	(Belgium) SPA		(Netherlands) ZAN		(Italy) IMO		(Netherlands) ASS		(Austria) RBR		(Belgium) ZOL		Points
1	(Belgium) Kobe Pauwels	(Belgium) D’ieteren Luxury Performance	3	**1**	2	1	2	1	3	1	4	2	4	5	232.5
2	(Netherlands) Sam Jongejan	(Netherlands) Team RaceArt	1	Ret	3	3	1	2	**1**	**2**	**2**	**7**	1	4	216
3	(Lithuania) Domas Raudonis	(Netherlands) Team GP Elite	7	5	**Ret**	7	4	**4**	2	4	9	4	**2**	**1**	158.5
4	(Netherlands) Jurriaan de Back	(Belgium) JW Raceservice	8	3	4	6	7	9	5	7	8	3	9	9	131
5	(Estonia) Alexander Reimann	(Estonia) EST1 Racing	6	4	7	5	3	6	Ret	8	3	6	6	6	125
6	(Belgium) Dréke Janssen	(Belgium) RedAnt Racing	WD	WD	5	4	Ret	3	7	10	1	1	7	7	119.5
7	(Latvia) Valters Aigars Zviedris	(Belgium) Q1-trackracing	**2**	8	6	8	5	8	6	6	5	8			104.5
8	(Netherlands) Nick Ho	(Netherlands) PG Motorsport	5	6	Ret	9	**6**	5	Ret	5	6	9	8	3	104
9	(Estonia) Thomas Kangro	Porsche Estonia	9	7	Ret	10	Ret	7	8	9	7	5	5	8	88.5
Guest drivers ineligible to score points
–	(Germany) Colin Bönighausen	(Germany) CarTech Motorsport	4	2											–
–	(Germany) Colin Bönighausen	(Netherlands) Bas Koeten Racing			1	**2**			4	3			3	2	–
–	(Belgium) Steve Meurrens	(Belgium) MM Racing											10	10	–
Pos.	Driver	Team	(Belgium) SPA		(Netherlands) ZAN		(Italy) IMO		(Netherlands) ASS		(Austria) RBR		(Belgium) ZOL		Points

=== Teams ===
Pos.	Team	Points
1	(Belgium) Q1-trackracing	304.5
2	(Belgium) D’ieteren Luxury Performance	257.5
3	(Belgium) RedAnt Racing	187.5
4	(Belgium) JW Raceservice	184.5
5	(Netherlands) Hans Weijs Motorsport	184
6	(Netherlands) Team RaceArt	149.5
7	(Netherlands) Team GP Elite	95
8	(Belgium) NGT Racing	82
9	(Netherlands) PG Motorsport	56.5
10	(Estonia) EST1 Racing	53.5
11	(Finland) 39 Racing	28.5
12	Porsche Estonia	21
