= Dirk Schouten =

Dutch racing driver (born 2001)

- Schouten driving in the 2026 Porsche Carrera Cup Germany at Norisring
- Born: 1 March 2001 (age 25); Hoorn, Netherlands
- Occupation: Racing driver
- Relatives: Bas Schouten (cousin)
- Nationality: (Netherlands) Dutch

Porsche Carrera Cup Germany career
- Debut season: 2025
- Current team: Looping by CarTech
- Car number: 34
- Starts: 20
- Wins: 0
- Podiums: 0
- Poles: 0
- Fastest laps: 0
- Best finish: 10th in 2026

Previous series
- 2023-2024 2022 2022 2022 2021 2021 2021: Porsche Carrera Cup Benelux; Supercar Challenge - GT; 24H Series; GT Cup Open Europe; International GT Open; Belcar Endurance Championship; Touring Car Endurance Series

Championship titles
- 2024: Porsche Carrera Cup Benelux
- Statistics up to date as of 4th November 2026.
- Website: dirkschoutenracing.com

Dirk Schouten (Dutch pronunciation: [dˈɪrk sxˈʌutən]; born 1 March 2001) is a Dutch racing driver who is currently competing in the 2026 Porsche Sixt Carrera Cup Deutschland and in the Porsche Mobil 1 Supercup. Schouten claimed the championship title in the 2024 season of the Porsche Carrera Cup Benelux. He competed as a guest driver in 2 rounds of the 2024 Porsche Supercup for two different teams.

== Career ==
=== Touring Car Endurance Series ===
Schouten made his car racing debut in the 2021 Touring Car Endurance Series at Mugello Circuit driving the No. 202 JR Motorsport BMW M3 E46 GTR in the TCX class alongside his father Coos Schouten and Dirk's cousin Bas Schouten. The trio finished third in the TCX class and 31st overall.

=== International GT Open ===
==== 2021 ====
Alongside his select start in the Touring Car Endurance Series, Schouten also competed in the 2021 International GT Open. Schouten would drive the No. 53 Q1 by EMG Motorsport Porsche 992 GT3 Cup alongside teammate Nicolas Vandierendonck in the Am Cup. Schouten and Vandierendonck made their first start in the second round held at Circuit de Spa-Francorchamps. Schouten and Vandierendonck won both races in their class.

Later in the season, the pair would return for rounds 6 and 7 at Monza and Barcelona respectively. However, they would move classes into the Pro-Am Cup. Schouten and Vandierendonck would win race one at Monza, and get podiums in all four races. They ended the season finishing third in the Pro-Am Cup.

=== GT Cup Open Europe ===
==== 2022 ====
For 2022, Schouten moved over to the GT Cup Open Europe driving the No. 53 Q1 Trackracing Porsche 992 GT3 Cup alongside Lukas Valkre. Schouten and Valkre would contest the full season in the Pro-Am Cup. The pair had four poles, four fastest laps, and nine podiums during the season.

=== Porsche Carrera Cup Benelux ===
==== 2023 ====
Following his season in the GT Cup Open Europe, Schouten announced that he would compete full-time in the Porsche Carrera Cup Benelux for the 2023 season driving for Q1 Trackracing. In round 10 at Circuit Zolder, he would achieve his first podium in the championship finishing second behind Bertrand Baguette. Schouten finished the season fourth in the championship.

==== 2024 ====
Schouten returned to the championship for the 2024 season, once again driving for Q1 Trackracing. In race two at Circuit de Spa-Francorchamps, Schouten would win his first race in the championship, finishing six seconds ahead of fellow Dutchman Paul Meijer despite Schouten being handed a five-second time penalty. This result put Schouten in the lead of the championship following Benjamin Paque's retirement in race two. Going into the next race at Zandvoort, he qualified in second polesitter and teammate Niels Langeveld. Schouten got a better launch at the start and jumped ahead of Langeveld into the lead. However, an accident involving three cars meant the race had to be red flagged. As the field had not completed a full lap around the track prior to the red flag, the field would be reset and Schouten would start in second again behind Langeveld. On the second race start, Schouten once again got a better launch than Langeveld and overtook him for the lead. He and Langeveld would battle for the entirety of the race, but it was Schouten who prevailed, achieving his second win in a row. For race two, Schouten qualified on pole ahead of Benjamin Paque. At the start of race two, Paque got a better start than Schouten, who was overtaken by the Belgian before turn one. Schouten would remain behind Paque the whole race and finished second. The next round at Imola saw mixed fortunes for Schouten. He qualified fifth for race one, but during the race he ran out wide onto the gravel and spun out. This mistake dropped him to the back of the pack where he would remain and finish 18th.

=== Porsche Supercup ===
==== 2025 ====
For 2025, Schouten would join Dinamic Motorsport for the upcoming season of the Porsche Supercup as a rookie driver following his victory in the Porsche Carrera Cup Benelux. The first race at the Imola Circuit would result in an 11th-place finish, and fourth place on the rookie standings after starting from 17th on the grid. An incident involving several cars on the first lap which heavily benefited Schouten would result in a red flag, where he improved to ninth place on the grid for the restart.

At the second race in Monaco, Schouten would win in the rookie classification, with an eighth-place finish overall. A red flag on the first lap of the race would significantly shorten the distance of the race due to clashes with the Formula 1 race which was due to start later that afternoon. Half points were rewarded as a result of this.

== Racing record ==
=== Racing career summary ===
Season	Series	Team	Races	Wins	Poles	F/Laps	Podiums	Points	Position
2021	24H TCE Series - TCX	JR Motorsport	1	0	0	0	1	11	9th
2021	Supercar Challenge - GT	JR Motorsport	2	2	0	0	2	46	12th
2021	Belcar Endurance Championship	Q1 Trackracing	3	0	0	0	2	0	NC†
2021	International GT Open - Am	Q1 by EMG Motorsport	2	2	1	1	2	10	7th
2021	International GT Open - Pro-Am	Q1 by EMG Motorsport	4	1	0	1	4	30	**3rd**
2022	GT Cup Open Europe	Q1 Trackracing	10	0	4	4	9	100	**2nd**
2022	Supercar Challenge - GT	JR Motorsport	2	0	0	0	1	32	12th
2023	Porsche Carrera Cup Benelux	Q1 Trackracing	12	0	0	0	1	119	4th
2024	Porsche Carrera Cup Benelux	Q1 Trackracing	12	2	1	1	6	186.5	**1st**
2024	Porsche Supercup	Martinet / Forestier Racing	1	0	0	0	0	0	NC†
2024	Porsche Supercup	Ombra S.R.L.	1	0	0	0	0	0	NC†
2025	Porsche Carrera Cup Italy	Dinamic Motorsport	12	0	0	0	2	86	8th
2025	Porsche Supercup	Dinamic Motorsport	8	0	0	0	0	25	15th
2025	Porsche Carrera Cup Germany	Laptime Performance	4	0	0	0	0	0	NC†
2025	Belcar Endurance Championship - GT Cup	Q1-Trackracing							
2026	Porsche Carrera Cup Germany	Looping by CarTech	16	0	0	1	0	94	10th
2026	Porsche Supercup	Looping by CarTech	8	0	0	0	0	52.5	11th

† As Schouten was a guest driver, he was ineligible to score championship points.

=== Complete GT Cup Open Europe results ===
(key) (Races in bold indicate pole position) (Races in italics indicate fastest lap)

Year	Team	Class	Make	Engine	1	2	3	4	5	6	7	8	9	10	Rank	Points
2022	Q1 Trackracing	Pro-Am	Porsche 992 GT3 Cup	Porsche 4.0 L Flat-6	LEC; 1; 3	**LEC**; **2**; 2	SPA; 1; 2	**SPA**; **2**; 3	**HUN**; **1**; 2	HUN; 2; 2	**MON**; **1**; 3	MON; 2; 2	CAT; 1; 3	CAT; 2; 4	2nd	100

=== Complete Porsche Carrera Cup Benelux results ===
(key) (Races in bold indicate pole position) (Races in italics indicate fastest lap)

Year	Team	1	2	3	4	5	6	7	8	9	10	11	12	DC	Points	Ref
2023	Q1 Trackracing	SPA; 1; 10	SPA; 2; 8	HOC; 1; 5	HOC; 2; 7	ZAN; 1; 6	ZAN; 2; 4	ASS; 1; 8	ASS; 2; 23	ZOL; 1; 5	ZOL; 2; 2	RBR; 1; 6	RBR; 2; 10	4th	119	
2024	Q1 Trackracing	SPA; 1; 10	SPA; 2; 1	ZAN; 1; 1	**ZAN**; **2**; 2	IMO; 1; 18	IMO; 2; 5	ASS; 1; 4	ASS; 2; 2	RBR; 1; 4	RBR; 2; 2	ZOL; 1; 5	ZOL; 2; 3	1st	186.5	

=== Complete Porsche Carrera Cup Italy results ===
(key) (Races in bold indicate pole position) (Races in italics indicate fastest lap)

Year	Team	1	2	3	4	5	6	7	8	9	10	11	12	Pos.	Points
2025	Dinamic Motorsport	MIS1; 1; 15	MIS1; 2; 8	VAL; 1	VAL; 2	MUG; 1	MUG; 2	IMO1; 1	IMO1; 2	MIS2; 1	MIS2; 2	MNZ; 1	MNZ; 2	11th*	9*

^{*} Season still in progress.

=== Complete Porsche Supercup results ===
(key) (Races in bold indicate pole position) (Races in italics indicate fastest lap)

Year	Team	1	2	3	4	5	6	7	8	Pos.	Points
2024	Martinet / Forestier Racing	IMO	MON	RBR; Ret	SIL	HUN				NC†	0
2024	Ombra S.R.L.						SPA; 12	ZAN	MNZ	NC†	0
2025	Dinamic Motorsport	IMO; 11	MON; 6‡	CAT; 13	RBR; 13	SPA; 17	HUN; 12	ZAN; Ret	MNZ; 13	15th	25

^{†}As Schouten was a guest driver, he was ineligible for points.
^{‡} Half points awarded as less than 75% of race distance was completed.
^{*} Season still in progress.
