= 2021 International GT Open =

The 2021 International GT Open was the sixteenth season of the International GT Open, the grand tourer-style sports car racing series founded in 2006 by the Spanish GT Sport Organización. It began on 15 May at Circuit Paul Ricard and ended at the Circuit de Barcelona-Catalunya on 24 October after seven rounds of two races each. The 2021 season saw the GT Cup Open Europe brought into the International GT Open, meaning the GTC and GT4 cars shared grids with the headlining series.

== Entry list ==
Team	Car	No.	Drivers	Class	Rounds
(Italy) Team Lazarus	Bentley Continental GT3	4	(Ukraine) Ivan Peklin	P	1
(Italy) Team Lazarus	Bentley Continental GT3	4	(South Africa) Jordan Pepper	P	1
(Poland) Olimp Racing	Mercedes-AMG GT3 Evo	5	(Poland) Stanislaw Jedlinski	Am	3, 5, 7
(Poland) Olimp Racing	Mercedes-AMG GT3 Evo	5	(Poland) Krystian Korzeniowski	Am	3, 5, 7
(Poland) Olimp Racing	Mercedes-AMG GT3 Evo	777	(Poland) Karol Basz	PA	3, 5, 7
(Poland) Olimp Racing	Mercedes-AMG GT3 Evo	777	(Poland) Marcin Jedlinski	PA	3, 5, 7
(Belgium) Boutsen Ginion	Lamborghini Gallardo R-EX	6	(Switzerland) François Grimm	Am	1
(United Kingdom) Inception Racing	McLaren 720S GT3	7	(United States) Brendan Iribe	PA	All
(United Kingdom) Inception Racing	McLaren 720S GT3	7	(United Kingdom) Ollie Millroy	PA	All
(United Kingdom) Inception Racing	McLaren 720S GT3	72	(United Kingdom) Nick Moss	PA	1–2, 4–7
(United Kingdom) Inception Racing	McLaren 720S GT3	72	(United Kingdom) Joe Osborne	PA	1–2, 4–7
(Italy) Barone Rampante	Lamborghini Huracán GT3 Evo	8	(Italy) Giuseppe Cipriani	Am	1–4
(Bahrain) 2 Seas Motorsport	Mercedes-AMG GT3 Evo	9	(Croatia) Martin Kodrić	P	6–7
(Bahrain) 2 Seas Motorsport	Mercedes-AMG GT3 Evo	9	(Canada) Ethan Simioni	P	6–7
(Germany) Leipert Motorsport	Lamborghini Huracán GT3 Evo	10	(United States) Tyler Cooke	P	6
(Germany) Leipert Motorsport	Lamborghini Huracán GT3 Evo	10	(New Zealand) Brendon Leitch	P	6
(Denmark) Reno Racing	Honda NSX GT3 Evo	11	(Denmark) Jens Reno Møller	PA	All
(Denmark) Reno Racing	Honda NSX GT3 Evo	11	(Norway) Marcus Påverud	PA	All
(Denmark) Reno Racing	Honda NSX GT3 Evo	18	(Italy) Marco Bonanomi	P	6
(Denmark) Reno Racing	Honda NSX GT3 Evo	18	(Italy) Jacopo Guidetti	P	6
(San Marino) AKM Motorsport	Mercedes-AMG GT3 Evo	14	(Germany) Jens Liebhauser	Am	1–2, 4
(San Marino) AKM Motorsport	Mercedes-AMG GT3 Evo	14	(Germany) Florian Scholze	Am	1–2, 4
(San Marino) AKM Motorsport	Mercedes-AMG GT3 Evo	14	(Italy) Marco Antonelli	Am	3
(San Marino) AKM Motorsport	Mercedes-AMG GT3 Evo	47	(Italy) Loris Spinelli	P	1–3, 6–7
(San Marino) AKM Motorsport	Mercedes-AMG GT3 Evo	47	(Italy) Loris Spinelli	PA	4
(San Marino) AKM Motorsport	Mercedes-AMG GT3 Evo	47	(Russia) Alexander Moiseev	PA	1–2
(San Marino) AKM Motorsport	Mercedes-AMG GT3 Evo	47	(Italy) Gianluca Giraudi	PA	3
(San Marino) AKM Motorsport	Mercedes-AMG GT3 Evo	47	(Germany) Florian Scholze	PA	5–7
(San Marino) AKM Motorsport	Mercedes-AMG GT3 Evo	47	(Germany) Nico Bastian	PA	5
(Germany) Twin Busch by Equipe Vitesse	Mercedes-AMG GT3 Evo	15	(Germany) Mario Hirsch	PA	1, 5
(Germany) Twin Busch by Equipe Vitesse	Mercedes-AMG GT3 Evo	15	(Germany) Dominik Schraml	PA	1, 5
(Italy) Vincenzo Sospiri Racing	Lamborghini Huracán GT3 Evo	16	(Italy) Giacomo Altoè	P	6
(Italy) Vincenzo Sospiri Racing	Lamborghini Huracán GT3 Evo	16	(Italy) Federico Leo	P	6
(Italy) Vincenzo Sospiri Racing	Lamborghini Huracán GT3 Evo	19	(Belgium) Baptiste Moulin	P	All
(Italy) Vincenzo Sospiri Racing	Lamborghini Huracán GT3 Evo	19	(Japan) Yuki Nemoto	P	All
(Italy) Vincenzo Sospiri Racing	Lamborghini Huracán GT3 Evo	63	(Italy) Michele Beretta	P	All
(Italy) Vincenzo Sospiri Racing	Lamborghini Huracán GT3 Evo	63	(Denmark) Frederik Schandorff	P	All
(Austria) HP Racing International	Lamborghini Huracán GT3 Evo	17	(Germany) Jan Seyffert	PA	1–3, 5–6
(Austria) HP Racing International	Lamborghini Huracán GT3 Evo	17	(Germany) "Coach McKansy"	PA	1
(Austria) HP Racing International	Lamborghini Huracán GT3 Evo	17	(Austria) Gerhard Tweraser	PA	2–3, 5–6
(Italy) Audi Sport Italia	Audi R8 LMS Evo	21	(Italy) Riccardo Agostini	P	4
(Italy) Audi Sport Italia	Audi R8 LMS Evo	21	(Italy) Lorenzo Ferrari	P	4
(United Kingdom) Balfe Motorsport	Audi R8 LMS Evo	22	(United Kingdom) Shaun Balfe	PA	1–2, 5, 7
(United Kingdom) Balfe Motorsport	Audi R8 LMS Evo	22	(United Kingdom) Adam Carroll	PA	1–2, 5, 7
(Switzerland) Kessel Racing	Ferrari 488 GT3 Evo 2020	25	(United States) Michael Dinan	P	3, 6
(Switzerland) Kessel Racing	Ferrari 488 GT3 Evo 2020	25	(United States) Robby Foley	P	3
(Switzerland) Kessel Racing	Ferrari 488 GT3 Evo 2020	73	(Zimbabwe) Axcil Jefferies	PA	6
(Switzerland) Kessel Racing	Ferrari 488 GT3 Evo 2020	73	(Poland) Roman Ziemian	PA	6
(Germany) Winward Motorsport	Mercedes-AMG GT3 Evo	48	(Germany) Nico Bastian	PA	1
(Germany) Winward Motorsport	Mercedes-AMG GT3 Evo	48	(Germany) Markus Sattler	PA	1
(Italy) AF Corse	Ferrari 488 GT3 Evo 2020	51	(Brazil) Oswaldo Negri Jr.	Am	7
(Italy) AF Corse	Ferrari 488 GT3 Evo 2020	51	(United States) Jay Schreibman	Am	7
(Italy) AF Corse	Ferrari 488 GT3 Evo 2020	52	(France) Hugo Delacour	PA	7
(Italy) AF Corse	Ferrari 488 GT3 Evo 2020	52	(Monaco) Cédric Sbirrazzuoli	PA	7
(United Kingdom) FF Corse	Ferrari 488 GT3 Evo 2020	55	(Belgium) Laurent de Meeus	PA	2
(United Kingdom) FF Corse	Ferrari 488 GT3 Evo 2020	55	(United Kingdom) Jamie Stanley	PA	2
(Italy) Nova Race Event	Honda NSX GT3 Evo	57	(Italy) Alberto Lippi	PA	6
(Italy) Nova Race Event	Honda NSX GT3 Evo	57	(Italy) Luca Magnoni	PA	6
(United Kingdom) TF Sport	Aston Martin Vantage AMR GT3	69	(United Kingdom) Sam De Haan	P	5
(United Kingdom) TF Sport	Aston Martin Vantage AMR GT3	69	(Republic of Ireland) Charlie Eastwood	P	5
(United Kingdom) TF Sport	Aston Martin Vantage AMR GT3	97	(United States) Michael Dinan	P	2, 7
(United Kingdom) TF Sport	Aston Martin Vantage AMR GT3	97	(United States) Robby Foley	P	2, 7
(Austria) Lechner Racing	Porsche 911 GT3 R	77	(Spain) Andy Soucek	P	All
(Austria) Lechner Racing	Porsche 911 GT3 R	77	(Oman) Al Faisal Al Zubair	P	1–2, 4–7
(Austria) Lechner Racing	Porsche 911 GT3 R	77	(United Kingdom) Ben Barker	P	3
(France) AKKA ASP Team	Mercedes-AMG GT3 Evo	87	(France) Thomas Drouet	P	7
(France) AKKA ASP Team	Mercedes-AMG GT3 Evo	87	(France) Jim Pla	P	7
(Poland) JP Motorsport	McLaren 720S GT3	88	(Austria) Christian Klien	PA	1–3
(Poland) JP Motorsport	McLaren 720S GT3	88	(Poland) Patryk Krupiński	PA	1–3
(Spain) Baporo Motorsport	Mercedes-AMG GT3 Evo	93	(Spain) Daniel Diaz-Varela	Am	3, 7
(Spain) Baporo Motorsport	Mercedes-AMG GT3 Evo	93	(Spain) Jaume Font	Am	3, 7
(Germany) Rinaldi Racing	Ferrari 488 GT3 Evo 2020	333	(Italy) Fabrizio Crestani	P	6
(Germany) Rinaldi Racing	Ferrari 488 GT3 Evo 2020	333	(Chile) Benjamín Hites	P	6
GT Cup Open Europe entries (Note: For the Paul Ricard round, only the second race was in combination with the GT Cup Open.)
Team	Car	No.	Drivers	Class	Rounds
(San Marino) AKM Motorsport	Lamborghini Huracán Super Trofeo Evo	12	(Italy) Glauco Solieri	Am	1
(Italy) Ghinzani Motorsport	Porsche 991 GT3 II Cup	12	(Italy) Glauco Solieri	Am	6
(Poland) A&P Racing Team PTT Tech Support	Porsche 991 GT3 II Cup	24	(Poland) Maciej Błażek	PA	1–3, 6–7
(Poland) A&P Racing Team PTT Tech Support	Porsche 991 GT3 II Cup	24	(Poland) Mateusz Lisowski	PA	1–3, 6–7
(Belgium) Q1 by EMG Motorsport	Porsche 991 GT3 II Cup	26	(Poland) Maciej Darmetko	PA	1–3, 6–7
(Belgium) Q1 by EMG Motorsport	Porsche 991 GT3 II Cup	26	(Poland) Artur Janosz	PA	1–3, 6–7
(Belgium) Q1 by EMG Motorsport	Porsche 992 GT3 Cup	50	(Netherlands) Jaap van Lagen	PA	2
(Belgium) Q1 by EMG Motorsport	Porsche 992 GT3 Cup	50	(Belgium) Filip Teunkens	PA	2, 7
(Belgium) Q1 by EMG Motorsport	Porsche 992 GT3 Cup	50	(Netherlands) Bas Schouten	PA	7
(Belgium) Q1 by EMG Motorsport	Porsche 992 GT3 Cup	53	(Netherlands) Dirk Schouten	Am	2
(Belgium) Q1 by EMG Motorsport	Porsche 992 GT3 Cup	53	(Belgium) Nicolas Vandierendonck	Am	2
(Belgium) Q1 by EMG Motorsport	Porsche 992 GT3 Cup	53	(Netherlands) Dirk Schouten	PA	6–7
(Belgium) Q1 by EMG Motorsport	Porsche 992 GT3 Cup	53	(Belgium) Nicolas Vandierendonck	PA	6–7
(Belgium) Q1 by EMG Motorsport	Porsche 992 GT3 Cup	54	(Belgium) Jan Lauryssen	PA	2, 6–7
(Belgium) Q1 by EMG Motorsport	Porsche 992 GT3 Cup	54	(Netherlands) Bas Schouten	PA	2
(Andorra) Three Sixty Racing Team	Porsche 991 GT3 II Cup	27	(Brazil) Marcio Mauro	Am	1–2, 6–7
(Andorra) Three Sixty Racing Team	Porsche 991 GT3 II Cup	27	(Andorra) Oscar Aristot	Am	1, 7
(Andorra) Three Sixty Racing Team	Porsche 991 GT3 II Cup	32	(Brazil) Fernando Fortes	Am	1–2, 6–7
(Andorra) Three Sixty Racing Team	Transam Euro (Ford Mustang)	126	(Spain) Albert Estragués	Am	1–2, 6
(Andorra) Three Sixty Racing Team	Porsche 991 GT3 I Cup	190	(Spain) Fernando Navarrete Sr.	Am	1
(Andorra) Three Sixty Racing Team	Porsche 991 GT3 I Cup	190	(Spain) Fernando Navarrete Jr.	Am	1
(Spain) J. Morcillo/E2P Racing	Porsche 991 GT3 II Cup	28	(Switzerland) Jan Klingelnberg	PA	1
(Spain) J. Morcillo/E2P Racing	Porsche 991 GT3 II Cup	28	(United Kingdom) Dino Zamparelli	PA	1
(Poland) (Italy) / Alda Motorsport (Note: Car No. 33 entered as Alda Motorsport at Round 3 and as Bonaldi Motorsport at Round 6. Car No. 100 entered as Alda Motorsport from Rounds 1 to 3 and as Bonaldi Motorsport at Round 6.); (Poland) (Italy) / Bonaldi Motorsport	Porsche 991 GT3 II Cup	33	(Poland) Tomasz Magdziarz	PA	3, 6
(Poland) (Italy) / Alda Motorsport; (Poland) (Italy) / Bonaldi Motorsport	Porsche 991 GT3 II Cup	33	(Netherlands) Daan Pijl	PA	3, 6
(Poland) (Italy) / Alda Motorsport; (Poland) (Italy) / Bonaldi Motorsport	Porsche 991 GT3 II Cup	100	(Poland) Jan Antoszewski	PA	1–3, 6
(Poland) (Italy) / Alda Motorsport; (Poland) (Italy) / Bonaldi Motorsport	Porsche 991 GT3 II Cup	100	(Poland) Jakub Dwernicki	PA	1–3, 6
(Italy) Eugenio Pisani/ CAME Racing Team	Porsche 991 GT3 I Cup	44	(Italy) Stefano Bozzoni	PA	1–3, 6–7
(Italy) Eugenio Pisani/ CAME Racing Team	Porsche 991 GT3 I Cup	44	(Italy) Eugenio Pisani	PA	1–3, 6–7
(Italy) Mark Speakerwas/ CAME Racing Team	Porsche 991 GT3 I Cup	45	(Italy) Mark Speakerwas	PA	3, 7
(Italy) Mark Speakerwas/ CAME Racing Team	Porsche 991 GT3 I Cup	45	(Hungary) Péter Karpi	PA	3
(Italy) Mark Speakerwas/ CAME Racing Team	Porsche 991 GT3 I Cup	45	(Poland) Jan Antoszewski	PA	7
(Italy) Vincenzo Sospiri Racing	Lamborghini Huracán Super Trofeo Evo	66	(Poland) Andrzej Lewandowski	Am	1
(Germany) PROsport Racing	Aston Martin Vantage AMR GT4	191	(Belgium) Rodrigue Gillion	PA	1
(Germany) PROsport Racing	Aston Martin Vantage AMR GT4	191	(Belgium) Nico Verdonck	PA	1
(Spain) NM Racing Team	Mercedes-AMG GT4	215	(United States) August MacBeth	Am	7
(Spain) NM Racing Team	Mercedes-AMG GT4	215	(Spain) Albert Estragués	Am	7
(United Kingdom) Valluga Racing	Porsche 991 GT3 II Cup	991	(Switzerland) Jan Klingelnberg	PA	7
(United Kingdom) Valluga Racing	Porsche 991 GT3 II Cup	991	(United Kingdom) Dino Zamparelli	PA	7
Entry Lists:

Inter GT entries
Icon	Class
P	Pro Cup
PA	Pro-Am Cup
Am	Am Cup
GT Cup entries
Icon	Class
PA	Pro-Am Cup
Am	Am Cup

== Race calendar and results ==
- A seven-round provisional calendar was revealed on 1 December 2020. It represented a return to normalcy after the Coronavirus pandemic forced change in the 2020 season. The only addition on the original from 2020 is the Algarve International Circuit, which had lost its spot in the provisional calendar in 2020 due to scheduling conflicts. Due to the track's late addition to the Formula 1 calendar however, it was forced to be removed from the schedule in 2021 as well and was replaced with the Autodromo Internazionale Enzo e Dino Ferrari. Multiple other tracks had date changes because the pandemic caused the series to start in August rather than the planned April.

Round		Circuit	Date	Pole position	Pro Winner	Pro-Am Winner	Am Winner	Cup Pro-Am Winner	Cup Am Winner
1	R1	(France) Circuit Paul Ricard, Le Castellet	15 May	(United States) No. 48 Winward Motorsport	(Italy) No. 4 Team Lazarus	(United Kingdom) No. 72 Inception Racing	(San Marino) No. 14 AKM Motorsport	No Entries	No Entries
1	R1	(France) Circuit Paul Ricard, Le Castellet	15 May	(Germany) Markus Sattler (Germany) Nico Bastian	(South Africa) Jordan Pepper (Ukraine) Ivan Peklin	(United Kingdom) Nick Moss (United Kingdom) Joe Osborne	(Germany) Florian Scholze (Germany) Jens Liebhauser	No Entries	No Entries
1	R2	(France) Circuit Paul Ricard, Le Castellet	16 May	(United Kingdom) No. 22 Balfe Motorsport	(Italy) No. 63 Vincenzo Sospiri Racing	(Poland) No. 88 JP Motorsport	(Italy) No. 8 Barone Rampante	(Germany) No. 191 PROsport Racing	(Italy) No. 66 Vincenzo Sospiri Racing
1	R2	(France) Circuit Paul Ricard, Le Castellet	16 May	(United Kingdom) Shaun Balfe (United Kingdom) Adam Carroll	(Denmark) Frederik Schandorff (Italy) Michele Beretta	(Poland) Patryk Krupiński (Austria) Christian Klien	(Italy) Giuseppe Cipriani	(Belgium) Nico Verdonck (Belgium) Rodrigue Gillion	(Poland) Andrzej Lewandowski
2	R1	(Belgium) Circuit de Spa-Francorchamps	19 June	(United Kingdom) No. 7 Inception Racing	(Austria) No. 77 Lechner Racing	(United Kingdom) No. 7 Inception Racing	(San Marino) No. 14 AKM Motorsport	(Belgium) No. 50 Q1 by EMG Motorsport	(Belgium) No. 53 Q1 by EMG Motorsport
2	R1	(Belgium) Circuit de Spa-Francorchamps	19 June	(United States) Brendan Iribe (United Kingdom) Ollie Millroy	(Oman) Al Faisal Al Zubair (Spain) Andy Soucek	(United States) Brendan Iribe (United Kingdom) Ollie Millroy	(Germany) Florian Scholze (Germany) Jens Liebhauser	(Netherlands) Jaap van Lagen (Belgium) Filip Teunkens	(Netherlands) Dirk Schouten (Belgium) Nicolas Vandierendonck
2	R2	(Belgium) Circuit de Spa-Francorchamps	20 June	(United Kingdom) No. 22 Balfe Motorsport	(Italy) No. 63 Vincenzo Sospiri Racing	(Poland) No. 88 JP Motorsport	(San Marino) No. 14 AKM Motorsport	(Belgium) No. 54 Q1 by EMG Motorsport	(Belgium) No. 53 Q1 by EMG Motorsport
2	R2	(Belgium) Circuit de Spa-Francorchamps	20 June	(United Kingdom) Shaun Balfe (United Kingdom) Adam Carroll	(Denmark) Frederik Schandorff (Italy) Michele Beretta	(Poland) Patryk Krupiński (Austria) Christian Klien	(Germany) Florian Scholze (Germany) Jens Liebhauser	(Belgium) Jan Lauryssen (Netherlands) Bas Schouten	(Netherlands) Dirk Schouten (Belgium) Nicolas Vandierendonck
3	R1	(Hungary) Hungaroring	10 July	(San Marino) No. 47 AKM Motorsport	(Italy) No. 63 Vincenzo Sospiri Racing	(United Kingdom) No. 7 Inception Racing	(Italy) No. 8 Barone Rampante	(Poland) No. 24 A&P Racing Team PTT Tech Support	(Italy) No. 45 Mark Speakerwas/ CAME Racing Team
3	R1	(Hungary) Hungaroring	10 July	(Italy) Gianluca Giraudi (Italy) Loris Spinelli	(Denmark) Frederik Schandorff (Italy) Michele Beretta	(United States) Brendan Iribe (United Kingdom) Ollie Millroy	(Italy) Giuseppe Cipriani	(Poland) Maciej Błażek (Poland) Mateusz Lisowski	(Hungary) Péter Karpi (Italy) Mark Speakerwas
3	R2	(Hungary) Hungaroring	11 July	(Poland) No. 88 JP Motorsport	(Italy) No. 63 Vincenzo Sospiri Racing	(San Marino) No. 47 AKM Motorsport	(Italy) No. 8 Barone Rampante	(Belgium) No. 26 Q1 by EMG Motorsport	(Italy) No. 45 Mark Speakerwas/ CAME Racing Team
3	R2	(Hungary) Hungaroring	11 July	(Poland) Patryk Krupiński (Austria) Christian Klien	(Denmark) Frederik Schandorff (Italy) Michele Beretta	(Italy) Gianluca Giraudi (Italy) Loris Spinelli	(Italy) Giuseppe Cipriani	(Poland) Maciej Darmetko (Poland) Artur Janosz	(Hungary) Péter Karpi (Italy) Mark Speakerwas
4	R1	(Italy) Autodromo Internazionale Enzo e Dino Ferrari	24 July	(San Marino) No. 47 AKM Motorsport	(San Marino) No. 47 AKM Motorsport	(Denmark) No. 11 Reno Racing	(San Marino) No. 14 AKM Motorsport	No Entries	No Entries
4	R1	(Italy) Autodromo Internazionale Enzo e Dino Ferrari	24 July	(Italy) Loris Spinelli	(Italy) Loris Spinelli	(Denmark) Jens Reno Møller (Norway) Marcus Påverud	(Germany) Jens Liebhauser (Germany) Florian Scholze	No Entries	No Entries
4	R2	(Italy) Autodromo Internazionale Enzo e Dino Ferrari	25 July	(Italy) No. 63 Vincenzo Sospiri Racing	(Austria) No. 77 Lechner Racing	(Denmark) No. 11 Reno Racing	(San Marino) No. 14 AKM Motorsport	No Entries	No Entries
4	R2	(Italy) Autodromo Internazionale Enzo e Dino Ferrari	25 July	(Denmark) Frederik Schandorff (Italy) Michele Beretta	(Oman) Al Faisal Al Zubair (Spain) Andy Soucek	(Denmark) Jens Reno Møller (Norway) Marcus Påverud	(Germany) Jens Liebhauser (Germany) Florian Scholze	No Entries	No Entries
5	R1	(Austria) Red Bull Ring	11 September	(United Kingdom) No. 72 Inception Racing	(Italy) No. 63 Vincenzo Sospiri Racing	(United Kingdom) No. 72 Inception Racing	(Poland) No. 5 Olimp Racing	No Entries	No Entries
5	R1	(Austria) Red Bull Ring	11 September	(United Kingdom) Nick Moss (United Kingdom) Joe Osborne	(Denmark) Frederik Schandorff (Italy) Michele Beretta	(United Kingdom) Nick Moss (United Kingdom) Joe Osborne	(Poland) Stanislaw Jedlinski (Poland) Krystian Korzeniowski	No Entries	No Entries
5	R2	(Austria) Red Bull Ring	12 September	(United Kingdom) No. 69 TF Sport	(United Kingdom) No. 69 TF Sport	(San Marino) No. 47 AKM Motorsport	(Poland) No. 5 Olimp Racing	No Entries	No Entries
5	R2	(Austria) Red Bull Ring	12 September	(United Kingdom) Sam De Haan (Republic of Ireland) Charlie Eastwood	(United Kingdom) Sam De Haan (Republic of Ireland) Charlie Eastwood	(Germany) Nico Bastian (Germany) Florian Scholze	(Poland) Stanislaw Jedlinski (Poland) Krystian Korzeniowski	No Entries	No Entries
6	R1	(Italy) Autodromo Nazionale Monza	25 September	(Italy) No. 63 Vincenzo Sospiri Racing	(Bahrain) No. 9 2 Seas Motorsport	(United Kingdom) No. 7 Inception Racing	(Italy) No. 57 Nova Race Event	(Belgium) No. 53 Q1 by EMG Motorsport	(Italy) No. 12 Ghinzani Motorsport
6	R1	(Italy) Autodromo Nazionale Monza	25 September	(Denmark) Frederik Schandorff (Italy) Michele Beretta	(Croatia) Martin Kodrić (Canada) Ethan Simioni	(United States) Brendan Iribe (United Kingdom) Ollie Millroy	(Italy) Alberto Lippi (Italy) Luca Magnoni	(Netherlands) Dirk Schouten (Belgium) Nicolas Vandierendonck	(Italy) Glauco Solieri
6	R2	(Italy) Autodromo Nazionale Monza	26 September	(United Kingdom) No. 72 Inception Racing	(Germany) No. 333 Rinaldi Racing	(Austria) No. 17 HP Racing International	(Italy) No. 57 Nova Race Event	(Belgium) No. 54 Q1 by EMG Motorsport	(Italy) No. 12 Ghinzani Motorsport
6	R2	(Italy) Autodromo Nazionale Monza	26 September	(United Kingdom) Nick Moss (United Kingdom) Joe Osborne	(Italy) Fabrizio Crestani (Chile) Benjamín Hites	(Germany) Jan Seyffert (Austria) Gerhard Tweraser	(Italy) Alberto Lippi (Austria) Gerhard Tweraser	(Belgium) Jan Lauryssen (Netherlands) Bas Schouten	(Italy) Glauco Solieri
7	R1	(Spain) Circuit de Barcelona-Catalunya	23 October	(France) No. 87 AKKA ASP Team	(Bahrain) No. 9 2 Seas Motorsport	(San Marino) No. 47 AKM Motorsport	(Spain) No. 93 Baporo Motorsport	(Poland) No. 24 A&P Racing Team PTT Tech Support	(Andorra) No. 32 Three Sixty Racing Team
7	R1	(Spain) Circuit de Barcelona-Catalunya	23 October	(France) Thomas Drouet (France) Jim Pla	(Croatia) Martin Kodrić (Canada) Ethan Simioni	(Germany) Florian Scholze (Italy) Loris Spinelli	(Spain) Daniel Diaz-Varela (Spain) Jaume Font	(Poland) Maciej Błażek (Poland) Mateusz Lisowski	(Brazil) Fernando Fortes
7	R2	(Spain) Circuit de Barcelona-Catalunya	24 October	(United Kingdom) No. 72 Inception Racing	(Austria) No. 77 Lechner Racing	(United Kingdom) No. 72 Inception Racing	(Spain) No. 93 Baporo Motorsport	(Belgium) No. 54 Q1 by EMG Motorsport	(Spain) No. 215 NM Racing Team
7	R2	(Spain) Circuit de Barcelona-Catalunya	24 October	(United Kingdom) Nick Moss (United Kingdom) Joe Osborne	(Oman) Al Faisal Al Zubair (Spain) Andy Soucek	(United Kingdom) Nick Moss (United Kingdom) Joe Osborne	(Spain) Daniel Diaz-Varela (Spain) Jaume Font	(Belgium) Jan Lauryssen	(United States) August MacBeth (Spain) Albert Estragués

== Championship standings ==
=== Points systems ===
Points are awarded to the top 10 (Pro) or top 6 (Am, Pro-Am, Teams) classified finishers. If less than 6 participants start the race or if less than 75% of the original race distance is completed, half points are awarded. At the end of the season, the lowest race score is dropped; however, the dropped race cannot be the result of a disqualification or race ban.

==== Overall ====
Position	1st	2nd	3rd	4th	5th	6th	7th	8th	9th	10th
Points	15	12	10	8	6	5	4	3	2	1

==== Pro-Am, Am, and Teams ====
Position	1st	2nd	3rd	4th	5th	6th
Points	10	8	6	4	3	2

=== Drivers' championships ===
==== Overall ====
Pos.	Driver	Team	LEC (France)		SPA (Belgium)		HUN (Hungary)		IMO (Italy)		RBR (Austria)		MNZ (Italy)		CAT (Spain)		Points
International GT Open
1	(Denmark) Frederik Schandorff (Italy) Michele Beretta	(Italy) Vincenzo Sospiri Racing	5	1	5	1	1	3	2	2	1	4	2	3	6	3	151
2	(Spain) Andy Soucek	(Austria) Lechner Racing	4	3	1	3	3	4	3	1	12	7	5	2	5	2	126
3	(Oman) Al Faisal Al Zubair	(Austria) Lechner Racing	4	3	1	3			3	1	12	7	5	2	5	2	108
4	(Belgium) Baptiste Moulin (Japan) Yuki Nemoto	(Italy) Vincenzo Sospiri Racing	7	2	4	2	2	10	5	4	5	2	Ret	7	3	5	101
5	(United Kingdom) Ollie Millroy (United States) Brendan Iribe	(United Kingdom) Inception Racing	3	6	3	7	4	2	9	8	4	8	15	9	9	6	74
6	(Italy) Loris Spinelli	(San Marino) AKM Motorsport	10	8	8	9	7	1	1	3			9	12	4	Ret	63
7	(United Kingdom) Nick Moss (United Kingdom) Joe Osborne	(United Kingdom) Inception Racing	2	9	Ret	DNS			7	7	3	10	6	13	16	1	53
8	(Norway) Marcus Påverud (Denmark) Jens Reno Møller	(Denmark) Reno Racing	8	10	9	6	5	6	6	5	8	6	12	11	11	12	41
9	(Germany) Florian Scholze	(San Marino) AKM Motorsport	11	25	7	8			8	6	6	3	9	12	4	Ret	40
10	(Croatia) Martin Kodrić (Canada) Ethan Simioni	(Bahrain) 2 Seas Motorsport											1	8	1	7	37
11	(United States) Michael Dinan	(United Kingdom) TF Sport			2	10									7	9	30
11	(United States) Michael Dinan	(Switzerland) Kessel Racing					8	5					10	10			30
12	(United States) Robby Foley	(United Kingdom) TF Sport			2	10									7	9	28
12	(United States) Robby Foley	(Switzerland) Kessel Racing					8	5									28
13	(United Kingdom) Sam De Haan (Republic of Ireland) Charlie Eastwood	(United Kingdom) TF Sport									2	1					27
14	(Italy) Fabrizio Crestani (Chile) Benjamín Hites	(Germany) Rinaldi Racing											4	1			23
15	(Poland) Patryk Krupiński (Austria) Christian Klien	(Poland) JP Motorsport	Ret	4	10	4	9	8									22
16	(United Kingdom) Shaun Balfe (United Kingdom) Adam Carroll	(United Kingdom) Balfe Motorsport	6	11	6	5					9	11			8	10	22
17	(South Africa) Jordan Pepper (Ukraine) Ivan Peklin	(Italy) Team Lazarus	1	5													21
18	(France) Jim Pla (France) Thomas Drouet	(France) AKKA ASP													2	4	20
19	(Italy) Gianluca Giraudi	(San Marino) AKM Motorsport					7	1									19
20	(Germany) Jan Seyffert	(Austria) HP Racing International	12	13	11	15	14	7			10	9	8	6	10	8	19
20	(Austria) Gerhard Tweraser	(Austria) HP Racing International			11	15	14	7			10	9	8	6	10	8	19
21	(United Kingdom) Ben Barker	(Austria) Lechner Racing					3	4									18
=	(Italy) Marco Bonanomi (Italy) Jacopo Guidetti	(Denmark) Reno Racing											3	4			18
23	(Poland) Karol Basz (Poland) Marcin Jedlinski	(Poland) Olimp Racing					6	9			7	5			15	11	17
24	(Germany) Nico Bastian	(San Marino) AKM Motorsport									6	3					15
25	(Germany) Jens Liebhauser	(San Marino) AKM Motorsport	11	25	7	8			8	6							15
26	(Italy) Riccardo Agostini (Italy) Lorenzo Ferrari	(Italy) Audi Sport Italia							4	9							10
27	(Russia) Alexander Moiseev	(San Marino) AKM Motorsport	10	8	8	9											9
28	(Italy) Giacomo Altoè (Italy) Federico Leo	(Italy) Vincenzo Sospiri Racing											Ret	5			6
29	(Germany) Markus Sattler (Germany) Nico Bastian	(Germany) Winward Motorsport	9	7													6
30	(United States) Tyler Cooke (New Zealand) Brendon Leitch	(Germany) Leipert Motorsport											7	Ret			4
31	(Italy) Giuseppe Cipriani	(Italy) Barone Rampante	13	12	12	11	10	11	10	10							3
-	(Italy) Marco Antonelli	(San Marino) AKM Motorsport					11	12									0
-	(Germany) Mario Hirsch (Germany) Dominik Schraml	(Germany) Twin Busch by Equipe Vitesse	Ret	DNS							11	12			14	15	0
-	(Zimbabwe) Axcil Jefferies (Poland) Roman Ziemian	(Switzerland) Kessel Racing											11	17			0
-	(Germany) "Coach McKansy"	(Austria) HP Racing International	12	13													0
-	(Poland) Stanislaw Jedlinski (Poland) Krystian Korzeniowski	(Poland) Olimp Racing					12	Ret			13	13			18	25	0
-	(Spain) Daniel Diaz-Varela (Spain) Jaume Font	(Spain) Baporo Motorsport					Ret	14							12	13	0
-	(Monaco) Cedric Sbirrazzuoli (France) Hugo Delacour	(Italy) AF Corse													13	12	0
-	(Italy) Alberto Lippi (Italy) Luca Magnoni	(Italy) Nova Race Event											13	16			0
-	(United States) Oswaldo Negri (United States) Jay Schreibman	(Italy) AF Corse													17	16	0
-	(Switzerland) François Grimm	(Belgium) Boutsen Ginion	Ret	DNS													0
GT Cup Open
1	(Poland) Andrzej Lewandowski	(Italy) Vincenzo Sospiri Racing		14													15
2	(Belgium) Nico Verdonck (Belgium) Rodrigue Gillion	(Germany) PROsport Racing		15													12
3	(Poland) Maciej Darmetko (Poland) Artur Janosz	(Belgium) Q1 by EMG Motorsport		16													10
4	(Poland) Maciej Błażek (Poland) Mateusz Lisowski	(Poland) A&P Racing Team PTT Tech Support		17													8
5	(Italy) Glauco Solieri	(San Marino) AKM Motorsport		18													6
6	(Switzerland) Jan Klingelnberg (United Kingdom) Dino Zamparelli	(Spain) J. Morcillo/E2P Racing		19													5
7	(Brazil) Fernando Fortes	(Andorra) Three Sixty Racing Team		20													4
8	(Poland) Jakub Dwernicki (Poland) Jan Antoszewski	(Poland) Alda Motorsport		21													3
9	(Italy) Eugenio Pisani (Italy) Stefano Bozzoni	(Italy) Eugenio Pisani		22													2
10	(Spain) Fernando Navarrete Sr. (Spain) Fernando Navarrete Jr.	(Andorra) Three Sixty Racing Team		23													1
-	(Brazil) Marcio Mauro (Andorra) Oscar Aristot	(Andorra) Three Sixty Racing Team		24													0
-	(Spain) Albert Estragués	(Andorra) Three Sixty Racing Team		Ret													0
Pos.	Driver	Team	LEC (France)		SPA (Belgium)		HUN (Hungary)		IMO (Italy)		RBR (Austria)		MNZ (Italy)		CAT (Spain)		Points

==== Pro-Am ====
Pos.	Driver	Team	LEC (France)		SPA (Belgium)	HUN (Hungary)	IMO (Italy)	RBR (Austria)	MNZ (Italy)	CAT (Spain)	Points
International GT Open
1	(United Kingdom) Ollie Millroy (United States) Brendan Iribe	(United Kingdom) Inception Racing	2	2							16
2	(United Kingdom) Nick Moss (United Kingdom) Joe Osborne	(United Kingdom) Inception Racing	1	5							13
3	(Poland) Patryk Krupiński (Austria) Christian Klien	(Poland) JP Motorsport	Ret	1							10
4	(Germany) Markus Sattler (Germany) Nico Bastian	(Germany) Winward Motorsport	5	3							9
5	(Russia) Alexander Moiseev (Italy) Loris Spinelli	(San Marino) AKM Motorsport	6	4							6
6	(Norway) Marcus Påverud (Denmark) Jens Reno Møller	(Denmark) Reno Racing	4	6							6
7	(United Kingdom) Shaun Balfe (United Kingdom) Adam Carroll	(United Kingdom) Balfe Motorsport	3	7							6
-	(Germany) Dominik Schraml (Germany) Mario Hirsch	(Germany) Twin Busch by Equipe Vitesse	Ret	DNS							0
GT Cup Open
1	(Belgium) Nico Verdonck (Belgium) Rodrigue Gillion	(Germany) PROsport Racing		1							10
2	(Poland) Maciej Darmetko (Poland) Artur Janosz	(Belgium) Q1 by EMG Motorsport		2							8
3	(Poland) Maciej Błażek (Poland) Mateusz Lisowski	(Poland) A&P Racing Team PTT Tech Support		3							6
4	(Switzerland) Jan Klingelnberg (United Kingdom) Dino Zamparelli	(Spain) J. Morcillo/E2P Racing		4							4
5	(Poland) Jakub Dwernicki (Poland) Jan Antoszewski	(Poland) Alda Motorsport		5							3
6	(Italy) Eugenio Pisani (Italy) Stefano Bozzoni	(Italy) Eugenio Pisani		6							2
Pos.	Driver	Team	LEC (France)		SPA (Belgium)	HUN (Hungary)	IMO (Italy)	RBR (Austria)	MNZ (Italy)	CAT (Spain)	Points

==== Am ====
Pos.	Driver	Team	LEC (France)		SPA (Belgium)	HUN (Hungary)	IMO (Italy)	RBR (Austria)	MNZ (Italy)	CAT (Spain)	Points
International GT Open
1	(Germany) Florian Scholze (Germany) Jens Liebhauser	(San Marino) AKM Motorsport	1	3							13
2	(Germany) "Coach McKansy" (Germany) Jan Seyffert	(Austria) HP Racing International	2	2							12
3	(Italy) Giuseppe Cipriani	(Italy) Barone Rampante	3	1							11
-	(Switzerland) François Grimm	(Belgium) Boutsen Ginion	Ret	DNS							0
Pos.	Driver	Team	LEC (France)		SPA (Belgium)	HUN (Hungary)	IMO (Italy)	RBR (Austria)	MNZ (Italy)	CAT (Spain)	Points

=== Teams' championship ===
Only the highest two finishing cars from a team count towards the Teams' Championship

Pos.	Team	Manufacturer	Points
1	(Italy) Vincenzo Sospiri Racing	Lamborghini	156
2	(Austria) Lechner Racing	Porsche	75
3	(United Kingdom) Inception Racing	McLaren	59
4	(San Marino) AKM Motorsport	Mercedes-AMG	42
5	(United Kingdom) TF Sport	Aston Martin	28
6	(Denmark) Reno Racing	Honda	24
7	(Bahrain) 2 Seas Motorsport	Mercedes-AMG	22
8	(Germany) Rinaldi Racing	Ferrari	14
9	(Italy) Team Lazarus	Bentley	13
10	(Poland) JP Motorsport	McLaren	8
11	(United Kingdom) Balfe Motorsport	Audi	7
12	(Poland) Olimp Racing	Mercedes-AMG	5
13	(Italy) Audi Sport Italia	Audi	4
14	(Switzerland) Kessel Racing	Ferrari	3
15	(Germany) HP Racing International	Lamborghini	2
16	(Spain) Baporo Motorsport	Mercedes-AMG	0
-	(Italy) Barone Rampante	Lamborghini	0
-	(Belgium) Boutsen Ginion	Lamborghini	0
-	(Germany) Leipert Motorsport	Lamborghini	0
-	(Italy) Nova Race Event	Honda	0
-	(Germany) Twin Busch by Equipe Vitesse	Mercedes-AMG	0
-	(Germany) Winward Motorsport	Mercedes-AMG	0
