= 2021 Supercar Challenge =

Car racing competition

The 2021 Supercar Challenge powered by Hankook was the twenty-first Supercar Challenge season since it replaced the Supercar Cup in 2001. It began at Circuit Zandvoort 10 April and ended at TT Circuit Assen on 31 October.

== Calendar ==
Round	Circuit	Date	Event	Notes
1	Circuit Zandvoort, Netherlands	10–11 April		
2	Hockenheimring, Germany	21–23 May		Supporting 2021 12 Hours of Hockenheimring.
3	Circuit de Spa-Francorchamps, Belgium	4–6 June	Spa Euro Races	
4	Circuit Zolder, Belgium	16–18 July	Supercar Madness	
5	TT Circuit Assen, Netherlands	6–8 August	JACK'S Racing Day	VRM BMW M2 Cup competitors contested both races with the SCC and GT&PC cars.
6	TT Circuit Assen, Netherlands	17–19 September		Supporting 2021 Deutsche Tourenwagen Masters, VRM BMW M2 Cup competitors contested both races with the SCC and GT&PC cars.
7	Circuit de Spa-Francorchamps, Belgium	16–17 October	Racing Festival	VRM BMW M2 Cup competitors contested both races with the SCC and GT&PC cars.
8	TT Circuit Assen, Netherlands	29–31 October	Hankook Finale Races	

== Entry list ==
Team	Car	No.	Drivers	Class	Rounds
(Netherlands) Cor Euser Racing	MARC II V8	100	(Netherlands) Cor Euser	GT	5
(Netherlands) BODA Racing	Lamborghini Huracán Super Trofeo Evo	106	(Netherlands) Bob Herber	GT	1–5, 7–8
(Netherlands) BODA Racing	Mercedes C63 AMG Eurostar	106	(Netherlands) Bob Herber	GT	6
(Netherlands) BODA Racing	BMW Z4 GT3	107	(Netherlands) Daan Meijer	GT	1–6
(Netherlands) JR Motorsport	BMW M6 GT3	108	(Netherlands) Ted van Vilet	GT	7
(Netherlands) JR Motorsport	BMW M6 GT3	134	(Netherlands) Bas Schouten	GT	7–8
(Netherlands) JR Motorsport	BMW M6 GT3	134	(Netherlands) Dirk Schouten	GT	7
(Netherlands) JR Motorsport	BMW M6 GT3	134	(Netherlands) Ted van Vilet	GT	8
(Netherlands) JR Motorsport	BMW M4 Silhouette	111	(Netherlands) Max Tubben	GT	1
(Netherlands) JR Motorsport	BMW M3 E92 V8	208	(Netherlands) Ted van Vliet	SS1	1–3, 5–6
(Netherlands) JR Motorsport	BMW M3 E92 V8	208	(Netherlands) Oscar Gräper	SS1	1
(Netherlands) JR Motorsport	BMW M3 E92 V8	208	(Netherlands) Bas Schouten	SS1	6
(Netherlands) / Zilhouette Racing (Note: Car No. 111, 403, 405, 406, 461 entered as Zilhouette Racing, car No. 381 and 481 entered as Emmerschroot Racingteam, car No. 410 entered as MW Racingteam, car No. 469 entered as GLG Racingteam, car No. 498 entered as Hoekstra/de Jong Racingteam.); (Netherlands) / Emmerschroot Racingteam; (Netherlands) / MW Racingteam; (Netherlands) / GLG Racingteam; (Netherlands) / Hoekstra/de Jong Racingteam	BMW Z4 Zilhouette GTR	111	(Netherlands) Max Tubben	GT	2–8
(Netherlands) / Zilhouette Racing; (Netherlands) / Emmerschroot Racingteam; (Netherlands) / MW Racingteam; (Netherlands) / GLG Racingteam; (Netherlands) / Hoekstra/de Jong Racingteam	BMW Z4 Zilhouette	381	(Netherlands) Bernard Blaak	SS2	6–8
(Netherlands) / Zilhouette Racing; (Netherlands) / Emmerschroot Racingteam; (Netherlands) / MW Racingteam; (Netherlands) / GLG Racingteam; (Netherlands) / Hoekstra/de Jong Racingteam	BMW Z4 Zilhouette	381	(Netherlands) Lars Blaak	SS2	6–8
(Netherlands) / Zilhouette Racing; (Netherlands) / Emmerschroot Racingteam; (Netherlands) / MW Racingteam; (Netherlands) / GLG Racingteam; (Netherlands) / Hoekstra/de Jong Racingteam	BMW Z4 Zilhouette	403	(Netherlands) David Emaar	SP	4–6
(Netherlands) / Zilhouette Racing; (Netherlands) / Emmerschroot Racingteam; (Netherlands) / MW Racingteam; (Netherlands) / GLG Racingteam; (Netherlands) / Hoekstra/de Jong Racingteam	BMW Z4 Zilhouette	405	(Netherlands) Wolter Zijlstra	SP	6
(Netherlands) / Zilhouette Racing; (Netherlands) / Emmerschroot Racingteam; (Netherlands) / MW Racingteam; (Netherlands) / GLG Racingteam; (Netherlands) / Hoekstra/de Jong Racingteam	BMW Z4 Zilhouette	406	(Netherlands) Tim Rietveld	SP	6
(Netherlands) / Zilhouette Racing; (Netherlands) / Emmerschroot Racingteam; (Netherlands) / MW Racingteam; (Netherlands) / GLG Racingteam; (Netherlands) / Hoekstra/de Jong Racingteam	BMW Z4 Zilhouette	410	(Netherlands) Mark Wieringa	SP	1–2, 4–8
(Netherlands) / Zilhouette Racing; (Netherlands) / Emmerschroot Racingteam; (Netherlands) / MW Racingteam; (Netherlands) / GLG Racingteam; (Netherlands) / Hoekstra/de Jong Racingteam	BMW Z4 Zilhouette	461	(Netherlands) Mark Jobst	SP	1–4, 6–7
(Netherlands) / Zilhouette Racing; (Netherlands) / Emmerschroot Racingteam; (Netherlands) / MW Racingteam; (Netherlands) / GLG Racingteam; (Netherlands) / Hoekstra/de Jong Racingteam	BMW Z4 Zilhouette	469	(Netherlands) Jan Berry Drenth	SP	2, 4, 6–8
(Netherlands) / Zilhouette Racing; (Netherlands) / Emmerschroot Racingteam; (Netherlands) / MW Racingteam; (Netherlands) / GLG Racingteam; (Netherlands) / Hoekstra/de Jong Racingteam	BMW Z4 Zilhouette	469	(Netherlands) Niels Drenth	SP	2
(Netherlands) / Zilhouette Racing; (Netherlands) / Emmerschroot Racingteam; (Netherlands) / MW Racingteam; (Netherlands) / GLG Racingteam; (Netherlands) / Hoekstra/de Jong Racingteam	BMW Z4 Zilhouette	481	(Netherlands) Lars Blaak	SP	2–5
(Netherlands) / Zilhouette Racing; (Netherlands) / Emmerschroot Racingteam; (Netherlands) / MW Racingteam; (Netherlands) / GLG Racingteam; (Netherlands) / Hoekstra/de Jong Racingteam	BMW Z4 Zilhouette	481	(Netherlands) Bernard Blaak	SP	2–4
(Netherlands) / Zilhouette Racing; (Netherlands) / Emmerschroot Racingteam; (Netherlands) / MW Racingteam; (Netherlands) / GLG Racingteam; (Netherlands) / Hoekstra/de Jong Racingteam	BMW Z4 Zilhouette	496	(Netherlands) Marcel van der Lyke	SP	2, 4
(Netherlands) / Zilhouette Racing; (Netherlands) / Emmerschroot Racingteam; (Netherlands) / MW Racingteam; (Netherlands) / GLG Racingteam; (Netherlands) / Hoekstra/de Jong Racingteam	BMW Z4 Zilhouette	498	(Netherlands) Pieter de Jong	SP	1, 4–8
(Netherlands) / Zilhouette Racing; (Netherlands) / Emmerschroot Racingteam; (Netherlands) / MW Racingteam; (Netherlands) / GLG Racingteam; (Netherlands) / Hoekstra/de Jong Racingteam	BMW Z4 Zilhouette	498	(Netherlands) Jack Hoekstra	SP	1, 4–8
(Belgium) Speedlover	Porsche 991 GT3 Cup	119	(Netherlands) Jaxon Verhoeven	GT	7
(Belgium) Speedlover	Porsche 991 GT3 Cup	119	(Netherlands) Jean-Pierre Verhoeven	GT	7
(Netherlands) Team RaceArt	Nissan GT-R Nismo GT3	124	(Netherlands) Jules Grouwels	GT	4
(Netherlands) Team RaceArt	Nissan GT-R Nismo GT3	124	(Netherlands) Roger Grouwels	GT	4
(Belgium) JJ Racing	Porsche 991 GT3 Cup	126	(Belgium) Jos Jansen	GT	3
(Austria) Trencar Racing	Lamborghini Huracán GT3	148	(Austria) Bob Bau	GT	3
(Belgium) Domec Racing	Radical RXC GT3	177	(Netherlands) Patrick Engelen	GT	1, 4, 7
(Belgium) Domec Racing	Radical RXC GT3	177	(France) Philippe Haezebrouck	GT	1, 7, 8
(Austria) HB Racing	Lamborghini Huracán GT3	188	(Austria) Bernhard Löffler	GT	3
(Netherlands) Koopman Racing	BMW Z4 GT3	190	(Netherlands) Hein Koopman	GT	2–8
(Netherlands) Koopman Racing	BMW Z4 GT3	190	(Netherlands) Nicky Catsburg	GT	5
(Netherlands) Koopman Racing	BMW Z4 GT3	191	(Germany) Peter Posavac	GT	2, 5–8
(Netherlands) Koopman Racing	BMW M6 GT3	193	(Netherlands) Bart Arendsen	GT	5–8
(Netherlands) Koopman Racing	BMW M6 GT3	193	(Netherlands) Nicky Catsburg	GT	5–8
(Netherlands) Koopman Racing	BMW 1 Series GTR	206	(Netherlands) Bart Arendsen	SS1	1–5
(Netherlands) Koopman Racing	BMW 1 Series GTR	206	(Netherlands) Berry Arendsen	SS1	6
(Netherlands) Koopman Racing	BMW 1 Series GTR	206	(Netherlands) Joop Arendsen	SS1	6
(Netherlands) Koopman Racing	SEAT León Supercopa	306	(Netherlands) Berry Arendsen	SS2	3
(Netherlands) Koopman Racing	BMW M3 E46	308	(Netherlands) Joop Arendsen	SS2	3
(Netherlands) MP Motorsport	Mercedes-AMG GT3	195	(Netherlands) Henk de Jong	GT	5
(Netherlands) Carworld Motorsport	Porsche 991 GT3 Cup	199	(Netherlands) Erol Ertan	GT	6–7
(Netherlands) Carworld Motorsport	Porsche 991 GT3 Cup	199	(Netherlands) Rudy van Buren	GT	6
(Netherlands) Carworld Motorsport	Porsche 991 GT3 Cup	199	(Germany) Sebastian Freymuth	GT	7
(Netherlands) Gräper Racing powered by FMA	CUPRA León TCR	201	(Netherlands) Oscar Gräper	SS1	4, 8
(Netherlands) FEBO Racing Team	Hyundai i30 N TCR	202	(Netherlands) Dennis de Borst	SS1	All
(Netherlands) FEBO Racing Team	Hyundai i30 N TCR	202	(Netherlands) Stan van Oord	SS1	All
(Netherlands) Johan Kraan Motorsport	Radical SR1	205	(United Kingdom) Jerome Greenhalgh	SS1	7–8
(Netherlands) Johan Kraan Motorsport	Radical SR1	205	(United Kingdom) Robin Greenhalgh	SS1	7–8
(Netherlands) Johan Kraan Motorsport	Radical SR1	305	(United Kingdom) Jerome Greenhalgh	SS2	2–6
(Netherlands) Johan Kraan Motorsport	Radical SR1	305	(United Kingdom) Robin Greenhalgh	SS2	2–6
(Netherlands) Johan Kraan Motorsport	Saker GT	307	(Netherlands) Eddie van Dam	SS2	2
(Netherlands) Johan Kraan Motorsport	Saker GT	307	(Netherlands) Melvin van Dam	SS2	2
(Netherlands) Dams Racing	BMW M4 GT4	209	(Netherlands) Andy Dam	SS1	5, 7
(Netherlands) Racing Team Tappel	BMW Z4 Zilhouette	211	(Netherlands) Henk Tappel	SS1	3–8
(Netherlands) Racing Team Tappel	BMW Z4 Zilhouette	211	(Netherlands) Harold Wisselink	SS1	5–6, 8
(Germany) Pricon Racing	BMW M3 E90	222	(Germany) Marco Petry	SS1	6
(Germany) Pricon Racing	BMW M3 E90	222	(Germany) Jan von Kiedrowski	SS1	6
(Netherlands) MWR Racing	BMW M3 E46	233	(Netherlands) Remco de Beus	SS1	All
(Netherlands) Verhulst Invest Motorsports	Honda Civic Type R TCR (FK2)	239	(Netherlands) Tony Verhulst	SS1	4
(Netherlands) Equipe Verschuur	McLaren 570S GT4	242	(Netherlands) Charles Zwolsman Jr.	SS1	3, 6
(Netherlands) Equipe Verschuur	McLaren 570S GT4	242	(Netherlands) Albert Jochemms	SS1	3
(Netherlands) HBR Motorsport	BMW M3 E90	245	(Netherlands) Benjamin van den Berg	SS1	All
(Netherlands) HBR Motorsport	BMW M3 E90	245	(Netherlands) Robert van den Berg	SS1	All
(Netherlands) Euro Autosport Foundation	BMW M3 E92 V8	246	(Netherlands) Ruud Olij	SS1	1, 4–5, 7
(Netherlands) Euro Autosport Foundation	BMW M3 E92 V8	246	(Netherlands) Donald Molenaar	SS1	7
(Netherlands) Niemann Autorsport	BMW M3 GTR	249	(Netherlands) Michael Koel	SS1	1
(Netherlands) Niemann Autorsport	BMW M3 GTR	249	(Netherlands) Rients Visser	SS1	1
(Netherlands) Niemann Autorsport	Audi RS3 LMS TCR	255	(Netherlands) Henk Seitzma	SS1	6
(Netherlands) Niemann Autorsport	Audi RS3 LMS TCR	255	(Netherlands) John Wibier	SS1	6
(Netherlands) Niemann Autorsport	CUPRA León TCR	274	(Netherlands) Fabien Schoonhoven	SS1	6
(Netherlands) Niemann Autorsport	CUPRA León TCR	274	(Netherlands) Marcel Schoonhoven	SS1	6
(Netherlands) Niemann Autorsport	Mini Cooper	474	(Netherlands) Fabien Schoonhoven	SP	1
(Netherlands) Niemann Autorsport	Mini Cooper	474	(Netherlands) Marcel Schoonhoven	SP	1
(Netherlands) BS Racing Team	BMW M3 E46 GTR	259	(Netherlands) Marcel van de Maat	SS1	4–6, 8
(Netherlands) Snel Motorsport	Porsche 996 GT3 Cup	276	(Netherlands) Paul Sieljes	SS1	1, 8
(Netherlands) Snel Motorsport	Porsche 996 GT3 Cup	276	(Netherlands) Cornelian Verhoog	SS1	8
(Netherlands) Snel Motorsport	Porsche Cayman S	389	(Netherlands) Henk van Norel	SS2	1
(Belgium) JDK/BMS Motorsport	Audi RS3 LMS TCR	280	(Belgium) Michaël De Keersmaecker	SS1	3–4, 7
(Netherlands) DRDO	BMW M240i	309	(Netherlands) André Seinen	SS2	7
(Netherlands) DRDO	BMW M240i	373	(Netherlands) Bart Drost	SS2	7
(Netherlands) DRDO	BMW M3 E46	311	(Netherlands) Han Kirchhof	SS2	7
(Netherlands) DRDO	BMW M3 E46	341	(Netherlands) Dennis van der Linden	SS2	7
(Netherlands) DRDO	BMW M3 E46	342	(Netherlands) Peter Koelewijn	SS2	7
(Netherlands) DRDO	BMW M3 E46	343	(Netherlands) Han Wannet	SS2	7
(Netherlands) DRDO	BMW M3 E46	345	(Netherlands) Wessel Sandkuijl	SS2	7
(Netherlands) DRDO	BMW E46 Compact	346	(Netherlands) Jaxon Verhoeven	SS2	7
(Netherlands) DRDO	BMW E46 Compact	346	(Netherlands) Jean-Pierre Verhoeven	SS2	7
(Netherlands) DRDO	Volkswagen Golf GTi	472	(Netherlands) Pim Kievit	SP	7
(Belgium) Team VDB	CUPRA León TCR	325	(Belgium) Steven Teirlinck	SS2	3–4
(Belgium) Team VDB	CUPRA León TCR	325	(Netherlands) Yardy Hoogwerf	SS2	3
(Netherlands) MV Motorsport	Lamera Cup	343	(Netherlands) Dimitri van der Spek	SS2	8
(Netherlands) Peter Stox Racing	BMW M3 GT4	360	(Netherlands) Nick Stox	SS2	2
(Netherlands) Peter Stox Racing	BMW M3 GT4	360	(Netherlands) Peter Stox	SS2	2
(Ukraine) Protasov Racing	Volkswagen Golf GTI TCR	370	(Ukraine) Leonid Protasov	SS2	7
(Netherlands) Team Furori	BMW M3 E36 GTR	383	(Netherlands) Cees Lubbers	SS2	5
(Netherlands) Team Furori	BMW M3 E36 GTR	383	(Netherlands) Ricardo van der Ende	SS2	5
(Netherlands) Bas Koeten Racing	BMW M3 E36	390	(Netherlands) Bas Barenbrug	SP	1
(Netherlands) Bas Koeten Racing	BMW M3 E36	490	(Netherlands) Bas Barenbrug	SP	2, 5, 7
(Belgium) Traxx Racing Team	Peugeot RCZ Cup	401	(Belgium) Bart van den Broeck	SP	All
(Belgium) Traxx Racing Team	Peugeot RCZ Cup	401	(Belgium) Chris Voet	SP	All
(Belgium) Xwift Racing Events	BMW 325i	444	(Belgium) Guido Ryckerbusch	SP	4

Icon	Class
GT	GT class
SS1	Supersport 1 class
SS2	Supersport 2 class
SP	Sport class

== Race results ==
Bold indicates overall winner.

Round		Circuit	GT Winning Car	Supersport 1 Winning Car	Supersport 2 Winning Car	Sport Winning Car
Round		Circuit	GT Winning Drivers	Supersport 1 Winning Drivers	Supersport 2 Winning Drivers	Sport Winning Drivers
1	R1	(Netherlands) Zandvoort	**(Netherlands) No. 107 BODA Racing**	(Netherlands) No. 202 FEBO Racing Team	(Netherlands) No. 389 Snel Motorsport	(Netherlands) No. 461 Zilhouette Racing
1	R1	(Netherlands) Zandvoort	**(Netherlands) Daan Meijer**	(Netherlands) Dennis de Borst (Netherlands) Stan van Oord	(Netherlands) Henk van Norel	(Netherlands) Mark Jobst
1	R2	(Netherlands) Zandvoort	**(Netherlands) No. 106 BODA Racing**	(Netherlands) No. 245 HBR Motorsport	(Netherlands) No. 389 Snel Motorsport	(Netherlands) No. 461 Zilhouette Racing
1	R2	(Netherlands) Zandvoort	**(Netherlands) Bob Herber**	(Netherlands) Benjamin van den Berg (Netherlands) Robert van den Berg	(Netherlands) Henk van Norel	(Netherlands) Mark Jobst
2	R1	(Germany) Hockenheimring	**(Netherlands) No. 106 BODA Racing**	(Netherlands) No. 202 FEBO Racing Team	(Netherlands) No. 305 Johan Kraan Motorsport	(Netherlands) No. 410 MW Racingteam
2	R1	(Germany) Hockenheimring	**(Netherlands) Bob Herber**	(Netherlands) Dennis de Borst (Netherlands) Stan van Oord	(United Kingdom) Jerome Greenhalgh (United Kingdom) Robin Greenhalgh	(Netherlands) Mark Wieringa
2	R2	(Germany) Hockenheimring	**(Netherlands) No. 106 BODA Racing**	(Netherlands) No. 206 Koopman Racing	(Netherlands) No. 305 Johan Kraan Motorsport	(Belgium) No. 401 Traxx Racing Team
2	R2	(Germany) Hockenheimring	**(Netherlands) Bob Herber**	(Netherlands) Bart Arendsen	(United Kingdom) Jerome Greenhalgh (United Kingdom) Robin Greenhalgh	(Belgium) Bart van den Broeck (Belgium) Chris Voet
3	R1	(Belgium) Spa-Francorchamps	Races cancelled due to weather and damage to circuit			
3	R2	(Belgium) Spa-Francorchamps	Races cancelled due to weather and damage to circuit			
4	R1	(Belgium) Zolder	**(Netherlands) No. 106 BODA Racing**	(Netherlands) No. 206 Koopman Racing	(Netherlands) No. 305 Johan Kraan Motorsport	(Netherlands) No. 498 Hoekstra/de Jong Racingteam
4	R1	(Belgium) Zolder	**(Netherlands) Bob Herber**	(Netherlands) Bart Arendsen	(United Kingdom) Jerome Greenhalgh (United Kingdom) Robin Greenhalgh	(Netherlands) Pieter de Jong (Netherlands) Jack Hokstra
4	R2	(Belgium) Zolder	**(Belgium) No. 177 Domec Racing**	(Netherlands) No. 246 Euro Autosport Foundation	(Netherlands) No. 305 Johan Kraan Motorsport	(Netherlands) No. 498 Hoekstra/de Jong Racingteam
4	R2	(Belgium) Zolder	**(Netherlands) Patrick Engelen**	(Netherlands) Ruud Olij	(United Kingdom) Jerome Greenhalgh (United Kingdom) Robin Greenhalgh	(Netherlands) Pieter de Jong (Netherlands) Jack Hoekstra
5	R1	(Netherlands) Assen	**(Netherlands) No. 111 Zilhouette Racing**	(Netherlands) No. 259 BS Racing Team	(Netherlands) No. 305 Johan Kraan Motorsport	(Netherlands) No. 410 MW Racingteam
5	R1	(Netherlands) Assen	**(Netherlands) Max Tubben**	(Netherlands) Marcel van de Maat	(United Kingdom) Jerome Greenhalgh (United Kingdom) Robin Greenhalgh	(Netherlands) Mark Wieringa
5	R2	(Netherlands) Assen	**(Netherlands) No. 106 BODA Racing**	(Netherlands) No. 259 BS Racing Team	(Netherlands) No. 305 Johan Kraan Motorsport	(Belgium) No. 401 Traxx Racing Team
5	R2	(Netherlands) Assen	**(Netherlands) Bob Herber**	(Netherlands) Marcel van de Maat	(United Kingdom) Jerome Greenhalgh (United Kingdom) Robin Greenhalgh	(Belgium) Bart van den Broeck (Belgium) Chris Voet
6	R1	(Netherlands) Assen	**(Netherlands) No. 193 Koopman Racing**	(Netherlands) No. 206 JR Motorsport	(Netherlands) No. 305 Johan Kraan Motorsport	(Netherlands) No. 461 Zilhouette Racing
6	R1	(Netherlands) Assen	**(Netherlands) Bart Arendsen** **(Netherlands) Nicky Catsburg**	(Netherlands) Bas Schouten (Netherlands) Ted van Vliet	(United Kingdom) Jerome Greenhalgh (United Kingdom) Robin Greenhalgh	(Netherlands) Mark Jobst
6	R2	(Netherlands) Assen	**(Netherlands) No. 193 Koopman Racing**	(Netherlands) No. 259 BS Racing Team	(Netherlands) No. 381 Emmerschroot Racingteam	(Netherlands) No. 469 GLG Racingteam
6	R2	(Netherlands) Assen	**(Netherlands) Bart Arendsen** **(Netherlands) Nicky Catsburg**	(Netherlands) Marcel van de Maat	(Netherlands) Bernard Blaak (Netherlands) Lars Blaak	(Netherlands) Jan Berry Drenth
7	R1	(Belgium) Spa-Francorchamps	**(Netherlands) No. 134 JR Motorsport**	(Netherlands) No. 245 HBR Motorsport	(Netherlands) No. 309 DRDO	(Belgium) No. 401 Traxx Racing Team
7	R1	(Belgium) Spa-Francorchamps	**(Netherlands) Bas Schouten** **(Netherlands) Dirk Schouten**	(Netherlands) Benjamin van den Berg (Netherlands) Robert van den Berg	(Netherlands) André Seinen	(Belgium) Bart van den Broeck (Belgium) Chris Voet
7	R2	(Belgium) Spa-Francorchamps	**(Netherlands) No. 134 JR Motorsport**	(Netherlands) No. 202 FEBO Racing Team	(Netherlands) No. 309 DRDO	(Netherlands) No. 490 Bas Koeten Racing
7	R2	(Belgium) Spa-Francorchamps	**(Netherlands) Bas Schouten** **(Netherlands) Dirk Schouten**	(Netherlands) Dennis de Borst (Netherlands) Stan van Oord	(Netherlands) André Seinen	(Netherlands) Bas Barenbrug
8	R1	(Netherlands) Assen	**(Netherlands) No. 111 Zilhouette Racing**	(Netherlands) No. 201 Ferry Monster Autosport	(Netherlands) No. 381 Emmerschroot Racingteam	(Netherlands) No. 498 Hoekstra/de Jong Racingteam
8	R1	(Netherlands) Assen	**(Netherlands) Max Tubben**	(Netherlands) Oscar Gräper	(Netherlands) Bernard Blaak (Netherlands) Lars Blaak	(Netherlands) Pieter de Jong (Netherlands) Jack Hoekstra
8	R2	(Netherlands) Assen	**(Netherlands) No. 193 Koopman Racing**	(Netherlands) No. 201 Ferry Monster Autosport	(Netherlands) No. 381 Emmerschroot Racingteam	(Belgium) No. 401 Traxx Racing Team
8	R2	(Netherlands) Assen	**(Netherlands) Bart Arendsen** **(Netherlands) Nicky Catsburg**	(Netherlands) Oscar Gräper	(Netherlands) Bernard Blaak (Netherlands) Lars Blaak	(Belgium) Bart van den Broeck (Belgium) Chris Voet

=== Championship standings ===
Position	**1st**	**2nd**	**3rd**	**4th**	**5th**	**6th**	**7th**	**8th**	**9th**	**10th**	**11th**	**Pole**
Points	23	20	17	15	13	11	9	7	5	3	1	1

Pos.	Driver	Team	(Netherlands) ZAN		(Germany) HOC		(Belgium) SPA		(Belgium) ZOL		(Netherlands) ASS		(Netherlands) ASS		(Belgium) SPA		(Netherlands) ASS		Points
GT
1	(Netherlands) Bob Herber	(Netherlands) BODA Racing	3	1	**4**	**2**	C	C	**4**	**5**	7	3	14	6	9	11	2	7	259
2	(Netherlands) Max Tubben	(Netherlands) JR Motorsport	**7**	13															216
2	(Netherlands) Max Tubben	(Netherlands) Zilhouette Racing			7	5	C	C	6	6	4	5	11	4	Ret	Ret	4	8	216
3	(Netherlands) Nicky Catsburg	(Netherlands) Koopman Racing									**5**	Ret	**3**	2	**3**	4	**3**	4	150
4	(Netherlands) Daan Meijer	(Netherlands) BODA Racing	1	5	6	8	C	C	9	8	6	6	34	Ret					143
5	(Netherlands) Bart Arendsen	(Netherlands) Koopman Racing										Ret	**3**	2	**3**	4	**3**	4	129
6	(Germany) Peter Posavac	(Netherlands) Koopman Racing			8	4					9	8	23	9	16	10	7	22	127
7	(Netherlands) Hein Koopman	(Netherlands) Koopman Racing			Ret	7	C	C	10	9	39	DSQ	5	12	11	17	8	9	112
8	(Netherlands) Bas Schouten	(Netherlands) JR Motorsport													2	2	11	6	77
9	(Netherlands) Erol Ertan	(Netherlands) Carworld Classics											4	5	5	15			61
10	(Netherlands) Patrick Engelen	(Belgium) Domec Racing	Ret	Ret					7	4					17	7			58
11	(Netherlands) Ted van Vliet	(Netherlands) JR Motorsport													8	12	11	6	53
12	(Netherlands) Dirk Schouten	(Netherlands) JR Motorsport													2	2			46
13	(France) Philippe Haezebrouck	(Belgium) Domec Racing	Ret	Ret											17	7	16	10	40
14	(Netherlands) Rudy van Buren	(Netherlands) Carworld Classics											4	5					37
15	(Netherlands) Jules Grouwels (Netherlands) Jules Grouwels	(Netherlands) Team RaceArt							5	7									35
16	(Netherlands) Cor Euser	(Netherlands) Cor Euser Racing									8	4							33
17	(Netherlands) Jaxon Verhoeven (Netherlands) Jean-Pierre Verhoeven	(Belgium) Speedlover													6	5			32
18	(Germany) Sebastian Freymuth	(Netherlands) Carworld Classics													5	15			24
19	(Netherlands) Henk de Jong	(Netherlands) MP Motorsport									25	DNS							9
	(Belgium) Jos Jansen	(Belgium) JJ Racing					C	C											
	(Austria) Bernhard Löffler	(Austria) HB Racing					C	C											
	(Austria) Bob Bau	(Austria) Trencar Racing					C	C											
Supersport 1
1	(Netherlands) Dennis de Borst (Netherlands) Stan van Oord	(Netherlands) FEBO Racing Team	2	4	9	9	C	C	**13**	**12**	**18**	10	8	Ret	**18**	13	**13**	12	252
2	(Netherlands) Benjamin van den Berg (Netherlands) Robert van den Berg	(Netherlands) HBR Motorsport	4	2	10	**13**	C	C	12	20	19	Ret	Ret	8	7	16	10	23	202
3	(Netherlands) Remco de Beus	(Netherlands) MWR Racing	9	6	12	10	C	C	Ret	Ret	28	30	17	11	14	44	15	Ret	150
4	(Netherlands) Ruud Olij	(Netherlands) Euro Autosport Foundation	6	12					11	11	38	11			13	18			135
5	(Netherlands) Henk Tappel	(Netherlands) Racing Team Tappel					C	C	Ret	21	Ret	Ret	16	24	15	23	12	19	95
6	(Netherlands) Marcel van de Maat	(Netherlands) BS Racing Team							DSQ	DNS	18	13	35	7			Ret	15	87
7	(Netherlands) Bart Arendsen	(Netherlands) Koopman Racing	**5**	Ret	Ret	**6**	C	C	8	Ret	37	DNS							73
8	(Netherlands) Ted van Vliet	(Netherlands) JR Motorsport	Ret	Ret	11	DNS	C	C			24	26	**6**	Ret					69
9	(Netherlands) Oscar Gräper	(Netherlands) JR Motorsport	Ret	Ret															61
9	(Netherlands) Oscar Gräper	(Netherlands) Gräper Racing powered by FMA							Ret	19							9	11	61
10	(Netherlands) Harold Wisselink	(Netherlands) Racing Team Tappel									Ret	Ret	16	24			12	19	52
11	(United Kingdom) Jerome Greenhalgh (United Kingdom) Robin Greenhalgh	(Netherlands) Johan Kraan Motorsport													21	28	22	13	52
12	(Netherlands) Paul Sieljes	(Netherlands) Snel Motorsport	DNS	3													14	14	48
13	(Netherlands) Charles Zwolsman Jr.	(Netherlands) Equipe Verschuur					C	C					7	10					37
14	(Belgium) Michaël De Keersmaecker	(Belgium) JDK/BMS Motorsport					C	C	14	Ret					49	48			31
15	(Netherlands) Cornelian Verhoog	(Netherlands) Snel Motorsport															14	14	28
16	(Netherlands) Fabien Schoonhoven (Netherlands) Marcel Schoonhoven	(Netherlands) Niemann Autosport											12	21					28
17	(Netherlands) Tony Verhulst	(Netherlands) Verhulst Invest Motorsports							15	13									28
18	(Netherlands) Bas Schouten	(Netherlands) JR Motorsport											**6**	Ret					24
19	(Netherlands) Henk Seitzma (Netherlands) John Wibier	(Netherlands) Niemann Autosport											29	32					16
20	(Netherlands) Andy Dam	(Netherlands) Dams Racing									21	Ret			Ret	DNS			15
21	(Netherlands) Michael Koel (Netherlands) Rients Visser	(Netherlands) Niemann Autorsport	8	Ret															13
22	(Netherlands) Berry Arendsen (Netherlands) Joop Arendsen	(Netherlands) Koopman Racing											24	Ret					9
23	(Germany) Marco Petry (Germany) Jan von Kiedrowski	(Germany) Pricon Racing											Ret	34					9
	(Netherlands) Albert Jochemms	(Netherlands) Equipe Verschuur					C	C											
Supersport 2
1	(United Kingdom) Jerome Greenhalgh (United Kingdom) Robin Greenhalgh	(Netherlands) Johan Kraan Motorsport			**13**	**11**	C	C	**16**	**14**	16	13	**13**	Ret					164
2	(Netherlands) Bernard Blaak (Netherlands) Lars Blaak	(Netherlands) Emmerschroot Racingteam											Ret	26	41	35	**17**	17	94
3	(Netherlands) Henk van Norel	(Netherlands) Snel Motorsport	**10**	7															47
4	(Netherlands) André Seinen	(Netherlands) DRDO													**26**	31			47
5	(Netherlands) Cees Lubbers (Netherlands) Ricardo van der Ende	(Netherlands) Team Furori									**35**	19							41
6	(Netherlands) Bas Barenbrug	(Netherlands) Bas Koeten Racing	14	14															40
7	(Netherlands) Nick Stox (Netherlands) Peter Stox	(Netherlands) Peter Stox Racing			14	12													40
8	(Belgium) Steven Teirlinck	(Belgium) Team VDB					C	C	21	15									40
9	(Netherlands) Bart Drost	(Netherlands) DRDO													27	36			35
10	(Netherlands) Peter Koelewijn	(Netherlands) DRDO													37	34			35
11	(Netherlands) Dennis van der Linden	(Netherlands) DRDO													35	37			28
12	(Netherlands) Jaxon Verhoeven (Netherlands) Jean-Pierre Verhoeven	(Netherlands) DRDO													36	41			22
13	(Netherlands) Wessel Sandkuijl	(Netherlands) DRDO													40	39			20
14	(Netherlands) Han Kirchhoff	(Netherlands) DRDO													31	Ret			17
15	(Netherlands) Eddie van Dam (Netherlands) Melvin van Dam	(Netherlands) Johan Kraan Motorsport			17	Ret													17
16	(Netherlands) Han Wannet	(Netherlands) DRDO													46	45			10
17	(Ukraine) Leonid Protasov	(Ukraine) Protasov Racing													Ret	42			7
	(Netherlands) Dimitri van der Spek	(Netherlands) MV Motorsport															Ret	DNS	0
	(Netherlands) Yardy Hoogwerf	(Belgium) Team VDB					C	C											
	(Netherlands) Joop Arendsen	(Netherlands) Koopman Racing					C	C											
	(Netherlands) Berry Arendsen	(Netherlands) Koopman Racing					C	C											
Sport
1	(Netherlands) Pieter de Jong (Netherlands) Jack Hoekstra	(Netherlands) Hoekstra/de Jong Racingteam	12	11					17	16	31	24	**27**	27	42	43	**18**	18	238
2	(Belgium) Bart van den Broeck (Belgium) Chris Voet	(Belgium) Traxx Racing Team	16	10	**Ret**	**14**	C	C	**18**	**18**	Ret	23	31	28	34	49	21	16	217
3	(Netherlands) Mark Wieringa	(Netherlands) MW Racingteam	13	9	15	16			22	Ret	29	Ret	Ret	31	39	38	20	20	200
4	(Netherlands) Jan Berry Drenth	(Netherlands) GLG Racingteam			16	17			Ret	17	**33**	25	28	25			19	21	167
5	(Netherlands) Mark Jobst	(Netherlands) Zilhouette Racing	**11**	8	18	Ret	C	C	DSQ	Ret			25	29	**38**	Ret			152
6	(Netherlands) Bernard Blaak (Netherlands) Lars Blaak	(Netherlands) Emmerschroot Racingteam			Ret	18	C	C	Ret	23	34	28							63
7	(Netherlands) David Emaar	(Netherlands) Zilhouette Racing							Ret	Ret	36	29	32	Ret	43	47			63
8	(Netherlands) Marcel van der Lyke	(Netherlands) GP Racingteam			19	18			19	22									60
9	(Netherlands) Bas Barenbrug	(Netherlands) Bas Koeten Racing			20	DNS					Ret	DNS			Ret	40			33
10	(Netherlands) Fabien Schoonhoven (Netherlands) Marcel Schoonhoven	(Netherlands) Niemann Autorsport	15	15															28
11	(Netherlands) Wolter Zijlstra	(Netherlands) Zilhouette Racing											30	30					28
12	(Netherlands) Pim Kievit	(Netherlands) DRDO													44	46			26
13	(Netherlands) Tim Rietveld	(Netherlands) Zilhouette Racing											33	33					18
14	(Belgium) Guido Ryckerbusch	(Belgium) Xwift Racing Events							20	DNS									13
Pos.	Driver	Team	(Netherlands) ZAN		(Germany) HOC		(Belgium) SPA		(Belgium) ZOL		(Netherlands) ASS		(Netherlands) ASS		(Belgium) SPA		(Netherlands) ASS		Points

Key
Colour	Result
Gold	Winner
Silver	Second place
Bronze	Third place
Green	Other points position
Blue	Other classified position
Blue	Not classified, finished (NC)
Purple	Not classified, retired (Ret)
Red	Did not qualify (DNQ)
Red	Did not pre-qualify (DNPQ)
Black	Disqualified (DSQ)
White	Did not start (DNS)
White	Race cancelled (C)
Blank	Did not practice (DNP)
Blank	Excluded (EX)
Blank	Did not arrive (DNA)
Blank	Withdrawn (WD)
Blank	Did not enter (cell empty)
Text formatting	Meaning
**Bold**	Pole position
Italics	Fastest lap
