= 2022 GT Cup Open Europe =

The 2022 GT Cup Open Europe was the fourth season of the GT Cup Open Europe, the grand tourer-style sports car racing series founded by the Spanish GT Sport Organización. It began on 22 May at the Circuit Paul Ricard and ended on 16 October at the Circuit de Barcelona-Catalunya after five double-header meetings.

== Race calendar ==
Round		Circuit	Date
1	R1	(France) Circuit Paul Ricard	21–22 May
1	R2	(France) Circuit Paul Ricard	21–22 May
2	R1	(Belgium) Circuit de Spa-Francorchamps	18–19 June
2	R2	(Belgium) Circuit de Spa-Francorchamps	18–19 June
3	R1	(Hungary) Hungaroring	9–10 July
3	R2	(Hungary) Hungaroring	9–10 July
4	R1	(Italy) Autodromo Nazionale di Monza	24–25 September
4	R2	(Italy) Autodromo Nazionale di Monza	24–25 September
5	R1	(Spain) Circuit de Barcelona-Catalunya	15–16 October
5	R2	(Spain) Circuit de Barcelona-Catalunya	15–16 October

== Entry list ==
Team	Car	No.	Drivers	Class	Rounds
(Belgium) Street Art Racing	Aston Martin Vantage AMR GT4	007	(France) Julien Darras	PA	1–2, 4–5
(Belgium) Street Art Racing	Aston Martin Vantage AMR GT4	007	(France) Jahid Fazal-Karim	PA	1–2, 4–5
(Belgium) Q1 Trackracing	Porsche 718 Cayman GT4	2	(Belgium) Milan De Laet (Note: Drivers who started their first race of the season at the final round are ineligible for points and invisible as far as awarding points to other drivers.)	PA	5
(Belgium) Q1 Trackracing	Porsche 992 GT3 Cup	51	(Belgium) Filip Teunkens	Am	3
(Belgium) Q1 Trackracing	Porsche 992 GT3 Cup	52	(Belgium) Laurent Vandervelde	Am	All
(Belgium) Q1 Trackracing	Porsche 992 GT3 Cup	52	(Belgium) Nicolas Vandierendonck	Am	1–4
(Belgium) Q1 Trackracing	Porsche 992 GT3 Cup	52	(Belgium) Sven Van Laere (Note: Drivers who started their first race of the season at the final round are ineligible for points and invisible as far as awarding points to other drivers.)	Am	5
(Belgium) Q1 Trackracing	Porsche 992 GT3 Cup	53	(France) Lukas Valkre	Am	All
(Belgium) Q1 Trackracing	Porsche 992 GT3 Cup	53	(Netherlands) Dirk Schouten	Am	All
(Belgium) Q1 Trackracing	Porsche 992 GT3 Cup	54	(Belgium) Jan Lauryssen	PA	All
(Belgium) Q1 Trackracing	Porsche 992 GT3 Cup	55	(Belgium) Nicolas Vandierendonck	Am	5
(Belgium) Q1 Trackracing	Porsche 992 GT3 Cup	56	(Belgium) John de Wilde	Am	All
(Italy) SP Racing	Porsche 991 GT3 I Cup	9	(Italy) Fabio Fabiani	Am	All
(Italy) SP Racing	Porsche 991 GT3 I Cup	9	(Italy) Stefano Zerbi	Am	All
(Italy) SP Racing	Porsche 991 GT3 II Cup	44	(Italy) Eugenio Pisani	PA	All
(Italy) SP Racing	Porsche 991 GT3 II Cup	44	(Monaco) Stefano Zanini	PA	All
(Italy) Team Ghinzani Arco Motorsport	Porsche 992 GT3 Cup	12	(Italy) Glauco Solieri	Am	1–3
(Spain) Baporo Motorsport	Porsche 992 GT3 Cup	13	(Spain) Jaume Font	Am	3–5
(Spain) Baporo Motorsport	Porsche 992 GT3 Cup	13	(Andorra) Joan Vinyes	Am	5
(Romania) RO1 Racing	Porsche 991 GT3 II Cup	21	(Romania) Camil Perian	Am	2–5
(Romania) RO1 Racing	Porsche 991 GT3 II Cup	21	(Romania) Florin Tincescu	Am	2–5
(Spain) SVC Sport Management	Toyota GR Supra GT4	50	(Poland) Antoni Chodzen	PA	1–2, 5
(Spain) SVC Sport Management	Toyota GR Supra GT4	50	(Italy) Patrick Zamparini	PA	1–2
(San Marino) GDL Racing	Porsche 992 GT3 Cup	65	(Italy) Roberto Bosio	Am	1–2
(San Marino) GDL Racing	Porsche 992 GT3 Cup	65	(Italy) Samuele Bosio	Am	1–2
(San Marino) GDL Racing	Porsche 992 GT3 Cup	66	(Italy) Mario Cordoni	Am	1–2
(San Marino) GDL Racing	Porsche 992 GT3 Cup	66	(Argentina) Andres Josephon	Am	3
(San Marino) GDL Racing	Porsche 992 GT3 Cup	66	(Hungary) Csaba Walter	Am	3–4
(San Marino) GDL Racing	Porsche 992 GT3 Cup	66	(Hungary) Zsombor Nagy	Am	4
(San Marino) GDL Racing	Porsche 992 GT3 Cup	66	(Switzerland) Alex Fontana	PA	5
(San Marino) GDL Racing	Porsche 992 GT3 Cup	66	(Italy) Stefano Borghi	PA	5
(San Marino) GDL Racing	Porsche 992 GT3 Cup	67	(United Arab Emirates) Bashar Mardini	PA	1–2, 5
(San Marino) GDL Racing	Porsche 992 GT3 Cup	67	(Austria) Christopher Zöchling	PA	1–2, 5
(San Marino) GDL Racing	Porsche 992 GT3 Cup	67	(Switzerland) Alex Fontana	PA	3
(San Marino) GDL Racing	Porsche 992 GT3 Cup	67	(Italy) Stefano Borghi	PA	3
(San Marino) GDL Racing	Porsche 991 GT3 II Cup	68	(Italy) Roberto Rayneri	Am	1–2
(United Kingdom) 7TSIX	Lamborghini Huracán Super Trofeo Evo	76	(United Kingdom) Charlie Hollings	PA	4
(United Kingdom) 7TSIX	Lamborghini Huracán Super Trofeo Evo	76	(Cyprus) Rhea Loucas	PA	4
(Germany) Aust Motorsport	Audi R8 LMS GT4 Evo	88	(Germany) Bernd Schaible (Note: Drivers who started their first race of the season at the final round are ineligible for points and invisible as far as awarding points to other drivers.)	PA	5
(Germany) Aust Motorsport	Audi R8 LMS GT4 Evo	88	(Germany) Christer Jöns (Note: Drivers who started their first race of the season at the final round are ineligible for points and invisible as far as awarding points to other drivers.)	PA	5

Icon	Class
PA	Pro-Am Cup
Am	Am Cup

== Results ==
Bold indicates overall winner.

Round	Circuit	Pole position Team	Pro-Am Cup Winning Team	Am Cup Winning Team
Round	Circuit	Pole position Drivers	Pro-Am Cup Winning Drivers	Am Cup Winning Drivers
1	(France) Circuit Paul Ricard	(San Marino) No. 67 GDL Racing	**(Belgium) No. 54 Q1 Trackracing**	(Belgium) No. 56 Q1 Trackracing
1	(France) Circuit Paul Ricard	(Canada) Bashar Mardini (Austria) Christopher Zöchling	**(Belgium) Jan Lauryssen**	(Belgium) John de Wilde
2	(France) Circuit Paul Ricard	(Belgium) No. 53 Q1 Trackracing	**(San Marino) No. 67 GDL Racing**	(Belgium) No. 56 Q1 Trackracing
2	(France) Circuit Paul Ricard	(France) Lukas Valkre (Netherlands) Dirk Schouten	**(Canada) Bashar Mardini** **(Austria) Christopher Zöchling**	(Belgium) John de Wilde
3	(Belgium) Circuit de Spa-Francorchamps	(San Marino) No. 67 GDL Racing	**(Belgium) No. 54 Q1 Trackracing**	(Belgium) No. 56 Q1 Trackracing
3	(Belgium) Circuit de Spa-Francorchamps	(Switzerland) Alex Fontana (Italy) Stefano Borghi	**(Belgium) Jan Lauryssen**	(Belgium) John de Wilde
4	(Belgium) Circuit de Spa-Francorchamps	(Belgium) No. 53 Q1 Trackracing	**(Belgium) No. 54 Q1 Trackracing**	(Belgium) No. 56 Q1 Trackracing
4	(Belgium) Circuit de Spa-Francorchamps	(France) Lukas Valkre (Netherlands) Dirk Schouten	**(Belgium) Jan Lauryssen**	(Belgium) John de Wilde
5	(Hungary) Hungaroring	(Belgium) No. 53 Q1 Trackracing	**(Belgium) No. 54 Q1 Trackracing**	(Spain) No. 13 Baporo Motorsport
5	(Hungary) Hungaroring	(France) Lukas Valkre (Netherlands) Dirk Schouten	**(Belgium) Jan Lauryssen**	(Spain) Jaume Font
6	(Hungary) Hungaroring	(Belgium) No. 54 Q1 Trackracing	**(Belgium) No. 54 Q1 Trackracing**	(Spain) No. 13 Baporo Motorsport
6	(Hungary) Hungaroring	(Belgium) Jan Lauryssen	**(Belgium) Jan Lauryssen**	(Spain) Jaume Font
7	(Italy) Autodromo Nazionale di Monza	(Belgium) No. 53 Q1 Trackracing	**(Belgium) No. 54 Q1 Trackracing**	(Belgium) No. 56 Q1 Trackracing
7	(Italy) Autodromo Nazionale di Monza	(France) Lukas Valkre (Netherlands) Dirk Schouten	**(Belgium) Jan Lauryssen**	(Belgium) John de Wilde
8	(Italy) Autodromo Nazionale di Monza	(Belgium) No. 54 Q1 Trackracing	**(Belgium) No. 54 Q1 Trackracing**	(Spain) No. 13 Baporo Motorsport
8	(Italy) Autodromo Nazionale di Monza	(Belgium) Jan Lauryssen	**(Belgium) Jan Lauryssen**	(Spain) Jaume Font (Andorra) Joan Vinyes
9	(Spain) Circuit de Barcelona-Catalunya	(San Marino) No. 66 GDL Racing	**(San Marino) No. 66 GDL Racing**	(Spain) No. 13 Baporo Motorsport
9	(Spain) Circuit de Barcelona-Catalunya	(Switzerland) Alex Fontana	**(Switzerland) Alex Fontana**	(Spain) Jaume Font (Andorra) Joan Vinyes
10	(Spain) Circuit de Barcelona-Catalunya	(San Marino) No. 66 GDL Racing	**(San Marino) No. 67 GDL Racing**	(Belgium) No. 55 Q1 Trackracing
10	(Spain) Circuit de Barcelona-Catalunya	(Switzerland) Alex Fontana	**(Canada) Bashar Mardini** **(Austria) Christopher Zöchling**	(Belgium) Nicolas Vandierendonck

== Championship Standings ==
=== Drivers' Championships ===
Pos.	Driver	Team	(France) LEC	(Belgium) SPA	(Hungary) HUN	(Italy) MNZ	(Spain) CAT	Points
1	(Belgium) Jan Lauryssen	(Belgium) Q1 Trackracing						125
2	(France) Lukas Valkre (Netherlands) Dirk Schouten	(Belgium) Q1 Trackracing						100
3	(Belgium) John de Wilde	(Belgium) Q1 Trackracing						64
4	(Italy) Eugenio Pisani (Monaco) Stefano Zanini	(Italy) SP Racing						55
5	(Spain) Jaume Font	(Spain) Baporo Motorsport						52
6	(Switzerland) Alex Fontana	(San Marino) GDL Racing						49
7	(United Arab Emirates) Bashar Mardini (Austria) Christopher Zöchling	(San Marino) GDL Racing						45
8	(Belgium) Laurent Vandervelde	(Belgium) Q1 Trackracing						38
9	(Andorra) Joan Vinyes	(Spain) Baporo Motorsport						32
10	(Italy) Glauco Solieri	(Italy) Team Ghinzani Arco Motorsport						28
11	(Belgium) Nicolas Vandierendonck	(Belgium) Q1 Trackracing						26
12	(Italy) Stefano Borghi	(San Marino) GDL Racing						22
13	(Hungary) Csaba Walter	(San Marino) GDL Racing						21
14	(Romania) Camil Perian (Romania) Florin Tincescu	(Romania) RO1 Racing						21
15	(France) Julien Darras (France) Jahid Fazal-Karim	(Belgium) Street Art Racing						16
16	(Argentina) Andres Josephon	(San Marino) GDL Racing						12
17	(Hungary) Zsombor Nagy	(San Marino) GDL Racing						9
18	(Italy) Fabio Fabiani (Italy) Stefano Zerbi	(Italy) SP Racing						9
19	(United Kingdom) Charlie Hollings (Cyprus) Rhea Loucas	(United Kingdom) 7TSIX						8
20	(Italy) Roberto Bosio (Italy) Samuele Bosio	(San Marino) GDL Racing						6
21	(Poland) Antoni Chodzen	(Spain) SVC Sport Management						5
22	(Italy) Roberto Rayneri	(San Marino) GDL Racing						3
23	(Italy) Mario Cordoni	(San Marino) GDL Racing						3
24	(Belgium) Filip Teunkens	(Belgium) Q1 Trackracing						1
25	(Italy) Patrick Zamparini	(Spain) SVC Sport Management						0
26	(Belgium) Sven Van Laere	(Belgium) Q1 Trackracing						0
