= Sebastian Freymuth =

German racing driver (born 2002)

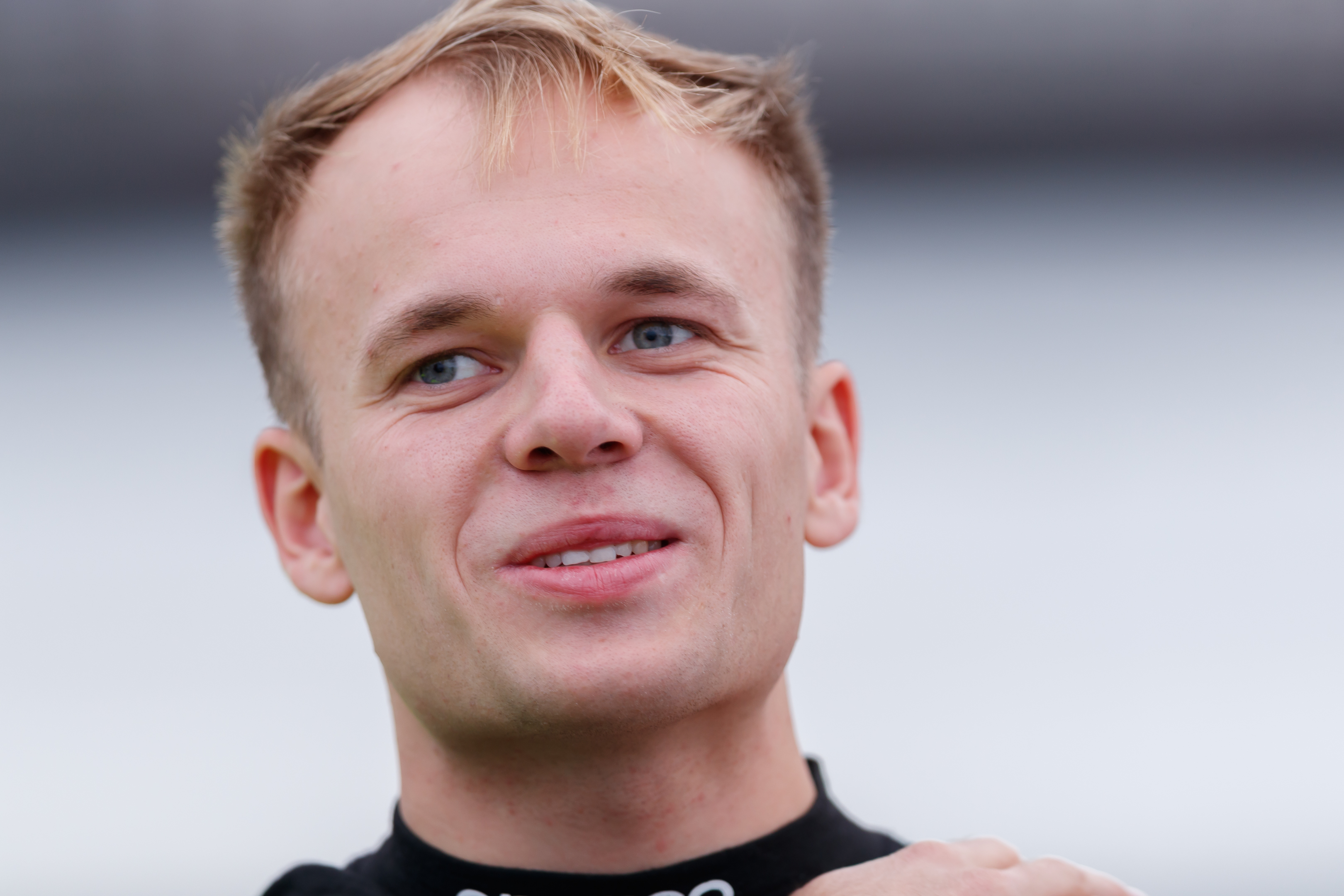
- Freymuth in 2023
- Nationality: (Germany) German
- Born: 31 January 2002 (age 24) Berlin, Germany

Porsche Carrera Cup Germany career
- Debut season: 2021
- Current team: Laptime Performance
- Car number: 31
- Former teams: HRT Performance, Huber Racing, Proton Huber Competition, Target Competition
- Starts: 80 (80 entries)
- Wins: 0
- Podiums: 0
- Poles: 0
- Fastest laps: 0
- Best finish: 15th in 2024

Previous series
- 2022–2025 2019–20: Porsche Supercup; Italian F4 Championship

Sebastian Freymuth (born 31 January 2002) is a German racing driver. He is competing in Porsche Carrera Cup Germany for Laptime Performance, having previously raced in the Italian F4 Championship.

== Racing record ==
=== Racing career summary ===
Season	Series	Team	Races	Wins	Poles	F/Laps	Podiums	Points	Position
2019	Italian F4 Championship	AS Motorsport	21	0	0	0	0	0	36th
2019	Drexler-Automotive Formel 4 Cup	AS Motorsport	2	2	?	?	2	25	**3rd**
2020	Italian F4 Championship	AS Motorsport	18	0	0	0	0	0	30th
2020	Drexler-Automotive Formel 4 Cup	Team AKF-Motorsport	2	2	?	?	2	25	**3rd**
2020	Austrian Circuit Championships - Division 2	N/A	?	?	?	?	?	50	**3rd**
2021	Porsche Carrera Cup Benelux	PG Motorsport	12	0	0	0	3	125	5th
2021	24H GT Series - 991	HRT Performance	1	0	0	0	0	0	NC†
2021	Porsche Carrera Cup Germany	HRT Performance	4	0	0	0	0	0	NC†
2021	Mazda MX-5 Cup Netherlands	N/A	2	0	0	0	0	11	29th
2021	Supercar Challenge - GT	Carworld Motorsport	2	0	0	0	1	24	18th
2022	Porsche Carrera Cup Germany	HRT Performance	16	0	0	0	0	9	21st
2022	Porsche Supercup	SSR Huber Racing	3	0	0	0	0	0	NC†
2022	Porsche Carrera Cup Benelux	PG Motorsport	8	0	0	0	0	49	12th
2023	Porsche Sprint Challenge Southern Europe - Sport Division - Pro	Huber Racing	6	0	0	0	1	71	4th
2023	Porsche Carrera Cup Germany	Huber Racing	16	0	0	0	0	42	16th
2023	Porsche Carrera Cup Italy	Raptor Engineering	2	0	0	0	0	5	28th
2023	Lamborghini Super Trofeo Europe	AKF Motorsport							
2024	Porsche Sprint Challenge Southern Europe - Pro	Proton Huber Competition	8	0	0	0	2	86	**3rd**
2024	Porsche Carrera Cup Germany	Proton Huber Competition	16	0	0	0	0	45	15th
2024	Porsche Supercup	Proton Huber Competition	8	0	0	0	0	17	15th
2025	Porsche Carrera Cup Germany	Target Competition	16	0	0	0	0	27	19th
2025	Porsche Supercup	Target Competition	3	0	0	0	0	0	NC†
2025	992 Endurance Cup	HRT Performance							
2026	Porsche Carrera Cup Germany	Laptime Performance	16	0	0	0	1	53	15th

^{†} As Freymuth was a guest driver, he was ineligible to score points.* Season still in progress.

=== Complete Italian F4 Championship results ===
(key) (Races in bold indicate pole position) (Races in italics indicate fastest lap)

Year	Team	1	2	3	4	5	6	7	8	9	10	11	12	13	14	15	16	17	18	19	20	21	22	Pos	Points
2019	AS Motorsport	VLL; 1; 17	VLL; 2; 17	VLL; 3; 17	MIS; 1; 23	MIS; 2; 16	MIS; 3 C	HUN; 1; 26	HUN; 2; 28	HUN; 3; 21	RBR; 1; 23	RBR; 2; 20	RBR; 3; 20	IMO; 1; 23	IMO; 2 Ret	IMO; 3; 24	IMO; 4; 22	MUG; 1; 19	MUG; 2; 24	MUG; 3; 20	MNZ; 1 Ret	MNZ; 2; 21	MNZ; 3; 16	36th	0
2020	AS Motorsport	MIS; 1; 18	MIS; 2 Ret	MIS; 3; 20	IMO1; 1 Ret	IMO1; 2; 20	IMO1; 3; 16	RBR; 1 Ret	RBR; 2; 18	RBR; 3 Ret	MUG; 1; 13	MUG; 2; 18	MUG; 3; 21	MNZ; 1; 15	MNZ; 2; 11	MNZ; 3; 20	IMO2; 1; 24	IMO2; 2; 16	IMO2; 3; 25	VLL; 1	VLL; 2	VLL; 3		30th	0

=== Complete Porsche Carrera Cup Benelux results ===
(key) (Races in bold indicate pole position) (Races in italics indicate fastest lap)

Year	Team	1	2	3	4	5	6	7	8	9	10	11	12	Pos.	Points
2021	PG Motorsport	SPA; 1; 7	SPA; 2; 3	RBR; 1; 8	RBR; 2; 8	ZND; 1; 4	ZND; 2; 5	ZOL; 1; 16	ZOL; 2; 7	ASS; 1; 4	ASS; 2 Ret	HOC; 1; 2	HOC; 2; 7	5th	125
2022	PG Motorsport	SPA; 1; 8	SPA; 2; 7	ZOL; 1; 5	ZOL; 2; 10	ZND; 1; 4	ZND; 2; 14	ASS; 1	ASS; 2	CAT; 1	CAT; 2	HOC; 1 Ret	HOC; 2; 15	12th	49

=== Complete Porsche Carrera Cup Germany results ===
(key) (Races in bold indicate pole position) (Races in italics indicate fastest lap)

Year	Team	1	2	3	4	5	6	7	8	9	10	11	12	13	14	15	16	DC	Points
2021	HRT Performance	SPA; 1	SPA; 2	OSC; 1	OSC; 2	RBR; 1; 17	RBR; 2; 18	MNZ1; 1; 15	MNZ1; 2; 22	ZAN; 1	ZAN; 2	MNZ2; 1	MNZ2; 2	SAC; 1	SAC; 2	HOC; 1	HOC; 2	NC†	0
2022	HRT Performance	SPA; 1; 24	SPA; 2; 22	RBR; 1; 15	RBR; 2; 12	IMO; 1 Ret	IMO; 2; 24	ZAN; 1; 12	ZAN; 2; 24	NÜR; 1; 25	NÜR; 2; 20	LAU; 1 Ret	LAU; 2; 19	SAC; 1; 20	SAC; 2; 18	HOC; 1; 24	HOC; 2; 19	21st	9
2023	Team Huber Racing	SPA; 1; 11	SPA; 2; 14	HOC1; 1; 11	HOC1; 2; 12	ZAN; 1; 10	ZAN; 2; 23	NÜR; 1; 18	NÜR; 2; 14	LAU; 1; 10	LAU; 2; 17	SAC; 1; 12	SAC; 2; 14	RBR; 1; 26	RBR; 2; 13	HOC2; 1; 13	HOC2; 2 Ret	16th	42
2024	Proton Huber Competition	IMO; 1; 11	IMO; 2; 10	OSC; 1; 17	OSC; 2 Ret	ZAN; 1 Ret	ZAN; 2; 12	HUN; 1; 12	HUN; 2; 14	NÜR; 1; 7	NÜR; 2 Ret	SAC; 1; 20	SAC; 2; 20	RBR; 1; 13	RBR; 2; 15	HOC; 1; 14	HOC; 2; 8	15th	45
2025	Target Competition	IMO; 1; 17	IMO; 2; 18	SPA; 1; 11	SPA; 2; 14	ZAN; 1	ZAN; 2	NOR; 1	NOR; 2	NÜR; 1	NÜR; 2	SAC; 1	SAC; 2	RBR; 1	RBR; 2	HOC; 1	HOC; 2	14th*	9*

^{†}As Freymuth was a guest driver, he was ineligible to score points.
^{*}Season still in progress.

=== Complete Porsche Supercup results ===
(key) (Races in bold indicate pole position) (Races in italics indicate fastest lap)

Year	Team	1	2	3	4	5	6	7	8	Pos.	Points
2022	SSR Huber Racing	IMO	MON	SIL	RBR	LEC	SPA; 23	ZND; 23	MNZ; 22	NC†	0
2024	Proton Huber Competition	IMO; 14	MON; 17	RBR; Ret	SIL; 21	HUN; 14	SPA; 10	ZAN; 17	MNZ; 28†	18th	12
2025	Target Competition	IMO; 14	MON; Ret	CAT	RBR; 16	SPA	HUN	ZAN	MNZ	NC†	0

^{†} As Freymuth was a guest driver, he was ineligible to score points.
