= Paul Meijer (racing driver) =

Dutch racing driver (born 1985)

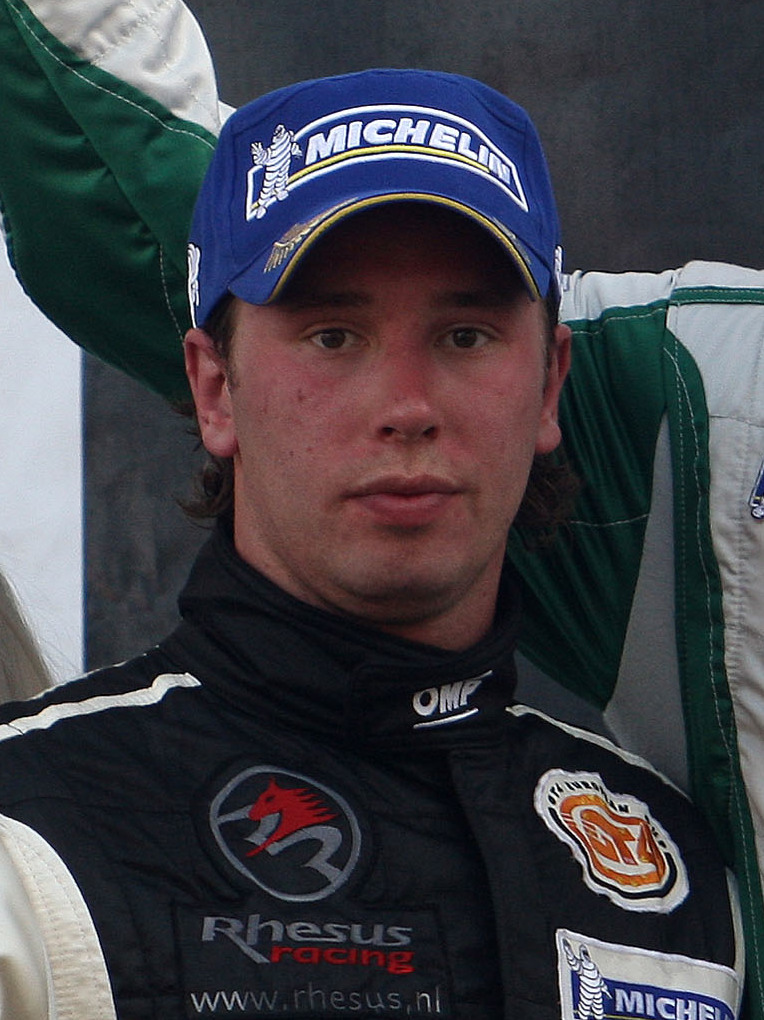
- Paul Meijer in 2010
- Nationality: (Netherlands) Dutch
- Born: Paul Ronald Johan Meijer; 27 March 1985 (age 41) Utrecht, Netherlands

Porsche Carrera Cup Benelux career
- Current team: Hans Weijs Motorsport
- Categorisation: FIA Silver

Championship titles
- 2003: Formula Renault 2.0 Netherlands

Paul Ronald Johan Meijer (born 27 March 1985) is a Dutch racing driver. He is a former Benelux Formula Renault champion. He currently competes in the GT Cup Open Europe for Burgers Motorsport by HVM/Iron Dames alongside fellow Dutchman and Iron Dames Academy member Laura van den Hengel.

== Early life ==
Meijer was born 27 March 1985 in Utrecht.

== Career ==
Meijer began his career in karting at the age of ten. He participated in national and international competitions.

In 2001, Meijer participated in a Challenge organized by Avaya Communications, with seven candidates. He won the Challenge and earned a season driving in the first Dutch Toyota Yaris Cup for free.

The ex Formula One racing driver Jan Lammers took Meijer into the Formula Ford in 2002. With Racing for Holland. Meijer learned the essentials about driving a formula racing car and participated in the Benelux Formula Ford Championship. During this education, Meijer also tested the DOME S101 sports car at Magny Cours.

In 2003, Meijer won the Formula Renault 2000 Netherlands series with AR Motorsport. He also debuted in the European Championship of this series. As Dutch Champion a test is offered him in the Formula Renault V6. Later that year, he also tested with Fortec in a Formula 3 car at Silverstone.

The Italian team Vergani Racing invited Meijer into the World Series light by Nissan. In November that year he tested at the circuits of Albecete and Jarama and on both occasions he drove the fastest laps of the day. The team invited Meijer for the final race weekend, where he finished third.

In 2004, Meijer entered the strong competition of the Eurocup Formula Renault 2.0. With his team AR Motorsport he became sixth in the Championship and finished three times second, three times fourth and two times fifth.

At the side, he participated also in the Benelux Formula Renault 2.0 Championship and could only compete in seven out of 12 races. He won six races, and scored a second-place finish in the other race.

In 2005 and 2006, Meijer failed to acquire a seat due to lack of sponsors

For 2007, AR Motorsport invited Meijer to test their cars. After being absent on the tracks for almost 2.5 years, Meijer was still quick, and within ten minutes he gained pole-position in practice. This was enough for team principal Ronald Heiligers to interest Marius Ritskes (Antonov Transmissions) to invite Paul for the last three race weekends in the North European Championship of Formula Renault 2.0. (NEC) He won two out of six races and finished second in the other four races.

Ritskes also arranged a test in the Lamborghini Gallardo in Spain with the team of Hans Reiter. After 40 laps the teams called him in with applause.

In 2008, Meijer has been asked to drive for several teams as a guest driver. The Dutch team MP Motorsport has been offered a wildcard in the Eurocup Formule Renault 2.0. They invited Meijer to be their driver. Meijer had no experience with the team but accepted the offer. Within a very competitive field of 48 young race drivers, he won the race on Sunday, 4 May.

=== Superleague Formula ===
When Peter Zakowsky's driver of the Borussia Dortmund car suddenly did not show up during the Superleague Formula races in Zolder, Meijer was asked to do the job through mediation of Tom Coronel. This was his chance to show what he was capable of in the top league of autosport (750 hp). The question was popped on Thursday, on Friday the seat was made and on Saturday he got two 30 minute sessions to train in the car. After that he started qualifying, which includes 2 semi finals shoot-outs and a final. Meijer amazed the team and the organization to gain pole-position. At a rainy track, he finished third.

As a rookie driver, Meijer made quite a debut in this field. Al Ain selected Meijer and offered him a seat for the last three weekends in Estoril, Vallelunga and Jerez. In Estoril, he won the second race. Unfortunately the season ended early, caused by crash during the first practise in Vallelunga, where Meijer broke his hand.

== Racing record ==
=== Complete Formula Renault 2.0 NEC results ===
(key) (Races in bold indicate pole position) (Races in italics indicate fastest lap)

Year	Entrant	1	2	3	4	5	6	7	8	9	10	11	12	13	14	15	16	DC	Points
2007	AR Motorsport	ZAN; 1	ZAN; 2	OSC; 1	OSC; 2	ASS; 1	ASS; 2	ZOL; 1	ZOL; 1	NUR; 1	NUR; 2	OSC; 1; 1	OSC; 2; 2	**SPA**; **1**; 1	SPA; 2; 2	**HOC**; **1**; 2	HOC; 2; 2	7th	156

=== Complete Eurocup Formula Renault 2.0 results ===
(key) (Races in bold indicate pole position; races in italics indicate fastest lap)

Year	Entrant	1	2	3	4	5	6	7	8	9	10	11	12	13	14	DC	Points
2008	MP Motorsport	SPA; 1 Ret	SPA; 2; 1													11th	21
2008	Epsilon Sport			SIL; 1; 11	SIL; 2; 8	HUN; 1; 8	HUN; 2; 38	NÜR; 1	NÜR; 2	LMS; 1	LMS; 2	EST; 1	EST; 2	CAT; 1	CAT; 2	11th	21

=== Superleague Formula results ===
(key)

Year	Team	1	2	3	4	5	6	7	8	9	10	11	12	Rank	Pts
2008	**Borussia Dortmund**; **Zakspeed**	DON	DON	NÜR	NÜR	**ZOL**; 3	ZOL; 11							14th	218†
2008	**Al Ain**; **Azerti Motorsport**							EST; 12	EST; 1	VAL	VAL	JER	JER	**12th**	**244**†

† - Team standings.

Sporting positions
Preceded by none	Dutch Formula Renault champion 2003	Succeeded by Junior Strous
