= Porsche Carrera Cup Benelux =

Motorsport series

- Category: One-make racing by Porsche
- Country: Benelux: Belgium and Netherlands
- Inaugural season: 2013
- Constructors: Porsche
- Tyre suppliers: Continental
- Drivers' champion: (Netherlands) Dirk Schouten
- Teams' champion: (Belgium) Q1-trackracing
- Official website: Porsche Carrera Cup Benelux Official Website

The Porsche Carrera Cup Benelux is the Belgian & Netherlands-based Porsche 911 Carrera Cup series for Porsche 911 GT3 Carrera Cup races, launched in 2013. The series is supported by Porsche Motorsport, Porsche Belgium, and Porsche Netherlands. In 2013 the Benelux series kicked off as the 20th Porsche one make series worldwide. Right from the start, the Cup had numerous fans and lots of interest from racing drivers and teams from all over Europe.

== Circuits ==
- (Portugal) Algarve International Circuit (2027)
- (Spain) Circuit de Barcelona-Catalunya (2017, 2019, 2022)
- (France) Circuit de la Sarthe Bugatti Circuit (2016)
- (France) Circuit de la Sarthe (2017)
- (Belgium) Circuit de Spa-Francorchamps (2013–2019, 2021–present)
- (Netherlands) Circuit Zandvoort (2013–present)
- (Belgium) Circuit Zolder (2013–2015, 2017–present)
- (France) Circuit Paul Ricard (2016, 2018)
- (Germany) Hockenheimring (2021–2023, 2026)
- (Hungary) Hungaroring (2025)
- (Italy) Imola Circuit (2024, 2026)
- (Germany) Nürburgring (2019–2020)
- (Austria) Red Bull Ring (2021, 2023–2024)
- (Netherlands) TT Circuit Assen (2013, 2015, 2019, 2021–present)

== Champions ==
Season	Champion	Team Champion	Car Model
2013	(Belgium) Jeffrey van Hooydonk	(Belgium) DVB Racing	Porsche 911 GT3 Cup Type 997
2014	(Netherlands) Xavier Maassen	(Belgium) Allure	Porsche 911 GT3 Cup Type 997
2015	(Netherlands) Peter Hoevenaars	Belgium Racing Team	Porsche 911 GT3 Cup Type 991
2016	(Belgium) Dylan Derdaele	Belgium Racing Team	Porsche 911 GT3 Cup Type 991
2017	(Netherlands) Xavier Maassen (2x)	(Belgium) DVB Racing	Porsche 911 GT3 Cup Type 991
2018	(Turkey) Ayhancan Güven	(Germany) Attempto Racing	Porsche 911 GT3 Cup Type 991.II
2019	(Netherlands) Max van Splunteren	(Germany) Attempto Racing	Porsche 911 GT3 Cup Type 991.II
2020	(Netherlands) Loek Hartog	(Netherlands) Bas Koeten Racing	Porsche 911 GT3 Cup Type 991.II
2021	(Belgium) Dylan Derdaele (2x)	Belgium Racing	Porsche 911 GT3 Cup Type 992
2022	(United Kingdom) Harry King	(United Kingdom) Parker Revs Motorsport	Porsche 911 GT3 Cup Type 992
2023	(Netherlands) Robert de Haan	(United Kingdom) Richardson Racing	Porsche 911 GT3 Cup Type 992
2024	(Netherlands) Dirk Schouten	(Belgium) Q1-trackracing	Porsche 911 GT3 Cup Type 992
2025	(Netherlands) Jaap van Lagen	(Belgium) Team RaceArt	Porsche 911 GT3 Cup Type 992
2026	(Poland) Milan Marczak	(Estonia) Quanloop EST1 Racing	Porsche 911 GT3 Cup Type 992
