= 2009 Le Mans Series =

6th season of sports car racing series

Seasons
- ← 2008 2010 →

The 2009 Le Mans Series was the sixth season of Automobile Club de l'Ouest's Le Mans Series. It was contested over five events between 5 April and 13 September 2009.

Aston Martin Racing trio Jan Charouz, Tomáš Enge and Stefan Mücke finished every race on the podium en route to the LMP1 championship. In LMP2, the pro-amateur pairing of Olivier Pla and Miguel Amaral won the title, with two class wins. Yann Clairay and Patrice Goueslard shared the honours in GT1, driving for former skier Luc Alphand's team. In the tightest battle out of the classes, Marc Lieb and Richard Lietz took GT2 honours by a single point ahead of JMW Motorsport pairing Rob Bell and Gianmaria Bruni.

== Schedule ==
On 10 October 2008, the Automobile Club de l'Ouest (ACO) announced a preliminary 2009 schedule consisting of five rounds. The 1000 km of Algarve in Portugal notionally replaced the 1000 km of Monza, while the rest of the events from 2008 remain. In a first for the Le Mans series, the Algarve ran at night. A second testing event was added to the schedule later, consisting of two days in April at the Bugatti Circuit in Le Mans, France.

Rnd	Race	Circuit	Date
–	(France) Test Session	Paul Ricard HTTT	8–9 March
1	(Spain) 1000 km of Catalunya	Circuit de Catalunya	5 April
–	(France) Test Session	Bugatti Circuit	25–26 April
2	(Belgium) 1000 km of Spa	Circuit de Spa-Francorchamps	10 May
3	(Portugal) 1000 km of Algarve	Autódromo Internacional do Algarve	1 August
4	(Germany) 1000 km of Nürburgring	Nürburgring	23 August
5	(United Kingdom) 1000 km of Silverstone	Silverstone Circuit	13 September

== Teams and drivers ==
=== LMP1 ===
Entrant	Car	Engine	Tyre	No.	Drivers	Rounds
(United Kingdom) Aston Martin Racing	Lola-Aston Martin B09/60	Aston Martin AM04 6.0 L V12	M	007	(Czech Republic) Jan Charouz	All
(United Kingdom) Aston Martin Racing	Lola-Aston Martin B09/60	Aston Martin AM04 6.0 L V12	M	007	(Czech Republic) Tomáš Enge	All
(United Kingdom) Aston Martin Racing	Lola-Aston Martin B09/60	Aston Martin AM04 6.0 L V12	M	007	(Germany) Stefan Mücke	All
(United Kingdom) Aston Martin Racing	Lola-Aston Martin B09/60	Aston Martin AM04 6.0 L V12	M	009	(Switzerland) Harold Primat	All
(United Kingdom) Aston Martin Racing	Lola-Aston Martin B09/60	Aston Martin AM04 6.0 L V12	M	009	(United Kingdom) Darren Turner	All
(United Kingdom) Aston Martin Racing	Lola-Aston Martin B09/60	Aston Martin AM04 6.0 L V12	M	009	(Portugal) Miguel Ramos	1–3
(Czech Republic) AMR Eastern Europe	Lola-Aston Martin B09/60	Aston Martin AM04 6.0 L V12	M	008	(United Kingdom) Chris Buncombe	4–5
(Czech Republic) AMR Eastern Europe	Lola-Aston Martin B09/60	Aston Martin AM04 6.0 L V12	M	008	(United Kingdom) Stuart Hall	4–5
(Czech Republic) AMR Eastern Europe	Lola-Aston Martin B09/60	Aston Martin AM04 6.0 L V12	M	008	(Portugal) Miguel Ramos	4–5
(Monaco) Scuderia Lavaggi	Lavaggi LS1	AER P32C 4.0 L Turbo V8	D	3	(Germany) Wolfgang Kaufmann	2, 4
(Monaco) Scuderia Lavaggi	Lavaggi LS1	AER P32C 4.0 L Turbo V8	D	3	(Monaco) Giovanni Lavaggi	2, 4
(United Kingdom) Team LNT	Ginetta-Zytek GZ09S	Zytek ZJ458 4.5 L V8	M	5	(United Kingdom) Greg Mansell	5
(United Kingdom) Team LNT	Ginetta-Zytek GZ09S	Zytek ZJ458 4.5 L V8	M	5	(United Kingdom) Nigel Mansell	5
(United Kingdom) Team LNT	Ginetta-Zytek GZ09S	Zytek ZJ458 4.5 L V8	M	5	(United Kingdom) Lawrence Tomlinson	5
(United Kingdom) Team LNT	Ginetta-Zytek GZ09S	Zytek ZJ458 4.5 L V8	M	22	(United Kingdom) Robbie Kerr	2
(United Kingdom) Team LNT	Ginetta-Zytek GZ09S	Zytek ZJ458 4.5 L V8	M	22	(United Kingdom) Guy Smith	2
(United Kingdom) Team LNT	Ginetta-Zytek GZ09S	Zytek ZJ458 4.5 L V8	M	22	(United Kingdom) Lawrence Tomlinson	2
(France) Team Peugeot Total	Peugeot 908 HDi FAP	Peugeot HDi 5.5 L Turbo V12 (Diesel)	M	7	(Austria) Christian Klien	2
(France) Team Peugeot Total	Peugeot 908 HDi FAP	Peugeot HDi 5.5 L Turbo V12 (Diesel)	M	7	(France) Nicolas Minassian	2
(France) Team Peugeot Total	Peugeot 908 HDi FAP	Peugeot HDi 5.5 L Turbo V12 (Diesel)	M	7	(France) Simon Pagenaud	2
(France) Team Peugeot Total	Peugeot 908 HDi FAP	Peugeot HDi 5.5 L Turbo V12 (Diesel)	M	9	(Australia) David Brabham	2
(France) Team Peugeot Total	Peugeot 908 HDi FAP	Peugeot HDi 5.5 L Turbo V12 (Diesel)	M	9	(Spain) Marc Gené	2
(France) Team Peugeot Total	Peugeot 908 HDi FAP	Peugeot HDi 5.5 L Turbo V12 (Diesel)	M	9	(Austria) Alexander Wurz	2
(France) Team Oreca Matmut AIM	Courage LC70E	AIM YS5.5 5.5 L V10	M	10	(Brazil) Bruno Senna	1
(France) Team Oreca Matmut AIM	Courage LC70E	AIM YS5.5 5.5 L V10	M	10	(Monaco) Stéphane Ortelli	1
(France) Team Oreca Matmut AIM	Courage LC70E	AIM YS5.5 5.5 L V10	M	11	(France) Nicolas Lapierre	1
(France) Team Oreca Matmut AIM	Courage LC70E	AIM YS5.5 5.5 L V10	M	11	(France) Olivier Panis	1
(France) Team Oreca Matmut AIM	Oreca 01	AIM YS5.5 5.5 L V10	M	10	(Brazil) Bruno Senna	2–3
(France) Team Oreca Matmut AIM	Oreca 01	AIM YS5.5 5.5 L V10	M	10	(Monaco) Stéphane Ortelli	2
(France) Team Oreca Matmut AIM	Oreca 01	AIM YS5.5 5.5 L V10	M	10	(Portugal) Tiago Monteiro	3
(France) Team Oreca Matmut AIM	Oreca 01	AIM YS5.5 5.5 L V10	M	10	(France) Nicolas Lapierre	5
(France) Team Oreca Matmut AIM	Oreca 01	AIM YS5.5 5.5 L V10	M	10	(France) Olivier Panis	5
(France) Team Oreca Matmut AIM	Oreca 01	AIM YS5.5 5.5 L V10	M	11	(France) Nicolas Lapierre	2–3
(France) Team Oreca Matmut AIM	Oreca 01	AIM YS5.5 5.5 L V10	M	11	(France) Olivier Panis	2–3
(France) Signature Plus	Courage LC70E	Judd GV5.5 S2 5.5 L V10	M	12	(France) Franck Mailleux	All
(France) Signature Plus	Courage LC70E	Judd GV5.5 S2 5.5 L V10	M	12	(France) Pierre Ragues	All
(Switzerland) Speedy Racing Team (United Kingdom) Sebah Automotive	Lola B08/60	Aston Martin AM04 6.0 L V12	M	13	(Italy) Andrea Belicchi	All
(Switzerland) Speedy Racing Team (United Kingdom) Sebah Automotive	Lola B08/60	Aston Martin AM04 6.0 L V12	M	13	(Switzerland) Marcel Fässler	All
(Switzerland) Speedy Racing Team (United Kingdom) Sebah Automotive	Lola B08/60	Aston Martin AM04 6.0 L V12	M	13	(France) Nicolas Prost	All
(Germany) Kolles	Audi R10 TDI	Audi TDI 5.5 L Turbo V12 (Diesel)	M	14	(United Kingdom) Andrew Meyrick	All
(Germany) Kolles	Audi R10 TDI	Audi TDI 5.5 L Turbo V12 (Diesel)	M	14	(Netherlands) Charles Zwolsman Jr.	All
(Germany) Kolles	Audi R10 TDI	Audi TDI 5.5 L Turbo V12 (Diesel)	M	14	(Germany) Michael Krumm	1
(Germany) Kolles	Audi R10 TDI	Audi TDI 5.5 L Turbo V12 (Diesel)	M	14	(India) Narain Karthikeyan	2–5
(Germany) Kolles	Audi R10 TDI	Audi TDI 5.5 L Turbo V12 (Diesel)	M	15	(Netherlands) Christijan Albers	All
(Germany) Kolles	Audi R10 TDI	Audi TDI 5.5 L Turbo V12 (Diesel)	M	15	(Denmark) Christian Bakkerud	All
(Germany) Kolles	Audi R10 TDI	Audi TDI 5.5 L Turbo V12 (Diesel)	M	15	(Switzerland) Giorgio Mondini	2–4
(France) Pescarolo Sport	Pescarolo 01	Judd GV5.5 S2 5.5 L V10	M	16	(France) Jean-Christophe Boullion	All
(France) Pescarolo Sport	Pescarolo 01	Judd GV5.5 S2 5.5 L V10	M	16	(France) Christophe Tinseau	All
(France) Pescarolo Sport	Pescarolo 01	Judd GV5.5 S2 5.5 L V10	M	16	(France) Emmanuel Collard	4
(France) Pescarolo Sport	Pescarolo 01	Judd GV5.5 S2 5.5 L V10	M	17	(Portugal) João Barbosa	1–2
(France) Pescarolo Sport	Pescarolo 01	Judd GV5.5 S2 5.5 L V10	M	17	(France) Bruce Jouanny	1–2
(United Kingdom) Strakka Racing	Ginetta-Zytek GZ09S	Zytek ZJ458 4.5 L V8	M	23	(United Kingdom) Nick Leventis	All
(United Kingdom) Strakka Racing	Ginetta-Zytek GZ09S	Zytek ZJ458 4.5 L V8	M	23	(United Kingdom) Danny Watts	All
(United Kingdom) Strakka Racing	Ginetta-Zytek GZ09S	Zytek ZJ458 4.5 L V8	M	23	(United Kingdom) Peter Hardman	1–2

=== LMP2 ===
Entrant	Car	Engine	Tyre	No.	Drivers	Rounds
OAK Racing; Team Mazda France	Pescarolo 01	Mazda MZR-R 2.0 L Turbo I4	D	24	(Monaco) Richard Hein	All
OAK Racing; Team Mazda France	Pescarolo 01	Mazda MZR-R 2.0 L Turbo I4	D	24	(France) Jacques Nicolet	All
OAK Racing; Team Mazda France	Pescarolo 01	Mazda MZR-R 2.0 L Turbo I4	D	35	(Switzerland) Karim Ajlani	All
OAK Racing; Team Mazda France	Pescarolo 01	Mazda MZR-R 2.0 L Turbo I4	D	35	(France) Matthieu Lahaye	All
(United Kingdom) RML	Lola B08/86	Mazda MZR-R 2.0 L Turbo I4	M	25	(Brazil) Thomas Erdos	All
(United Kingdom) RML	Lola B08/86	Mazda MZR-R 2.0 L Turbo I4	M	25	(United Kingdom) Mike Newton	All
(United Kingdom) Bruichladdich-Bruneau Team	Radical SR9	AER P07 2.0 L Turbo I4	D	26	(France) Pierre Bruneau	All
(United Kingdom) Bruichladdich-Bruneau Team	Radical SR9	AER P07 2.0 L Turbo I4	D	26	(United Kingdom) Stuart Moseley	1–2
(United Kingdom) Bruichladdich-Bruneau Team	Radical SR9	AER P07 2.0 L Turbo I4	D	26	(United Kingdom) Nigel Greensall	1
(United Kingdom) Bruichladdich-Bruneau Team	Radical SR9	AER P07 2.0 L Turbo I4	D	26	(United Kingdom) Jonathan Coleman	2
(United Kingdom) Bruichladdich-Bruneau Team	Radical SR9	AER P07 2.0 L Turbo I4	D	26	(United Kingdom) Tim Greaves	3, 5
(United Kingdom) Bruichladdich-Bruneau Team	Radical SR9	AER P07 2.0 L Turbo I4	D	26	(Italy) Francesco Sini	3–5
(United Kingdom) Bruichladdich-Bruneau Team	Radical SR9	AER P07 2.0 L Turbo I4	D	26	(Netherlands) Michael Vergers	4
(France) Ibañez Racing Service	Courage LC75	AER P07 2.0 L Turbo I4	D	28	(France) William Cavailhès	All
(France) Ibañez Racing Service	Courage LC75	AER P07 2.0 L Turbo I4	D	28	(France) Frédéric Da Rocha	All
(France) Ibañez Racing Service	Courage LC75	AER P07 2.0 L Turbo I4	D	28	(France) José Ibañez	All
(Italy) Racing Box	Lola B08/80	Judd DB 3.4 L V8	M	29	(Italy) Andrea Ceccato	1–4
(Italy) Racing Box	Lola B08/80	Judd DB 3.4 L V8	M	29	(Italy) Filippo Francioni	1–4
(Italy) Racing Box	Lola B08/80	Judd DB 3.4 L V8	M	29	(Italy) Giacomo Piccini	1–4
(Italy) Racing Box	Lola B08/80	Judd DB 3.4 L V8	M	30	(Italy) Thomas Biagi	1–4
(Italy) Racing Box	Lola B08/80	Judd DB 3.4 L V8	M	30	(Italy) Matteo Bobbi	1–4
(Italy) Racing Box	Lola B08/80	Judd DB 3.4 L V8	M	30	(Italy) Andrea Piccini	1–4
(Denmark) Team Essex	Porsche RS Spyder Evo	Porsche MR6 3.4 L V8	M	31	(France) Emmanuel Collard	2
(Denmark) Team Essex	Porsche RS Spyder Evo	Porsche MR6 3.4 L V8	M	31	(Denmark) Casper Elgaard	2
(Denmark) Team Essex	Porsche RS Spyder Evo	Porsche MR6 3.4 L V8	M	31	(Denmark) Kristian Poulsen	2
(France) Team Barazi-Epsilon	Zytek 07S/2	Zytek ZG348 3.4 L V8	M	32	(Denmark) Juan Barazi	2
(France) Team Barazi-Epsilon	Zytek 07S/2	Zytek ZG348 3.4 L V8	M	32	(Brazil) Fernando Rees	2
(Switzerland) Speedy Racing Team (United Kingdom) Sebah Automotive	Lola B08/80	Judd DB 3.4 L V8	M	33	(United Kingdom) Jonny Kane	All
(Switzerland) Speedy Racing Team (United Kingdom) Sebah Automotive	Lola B08/80	Judd DB 3.4 L V8	M	33	(France) Xavier Pompidou	All
(Switzerland) Speedy Racing Team (United Kingdom) Sebah Automotive	Lola B08/80	Judd DB 3.4 L V8	M	33	(Switzerland) Benjamin Leuenberger	2–5
(France) WR Salini	WR LMP2008	Zytek ZG348 3.4 L V8	D	37	(France) Philippe Salini	All
(France) WR Salini	WR LMP2008	Zytek ZG348 3.4 L V8	D	37	(France) Stéphane Salini	All
(France) WR Salini	WR LMP2008	Zytek ZG348 3.4 L V8	D	37	(France) Tristan Gommendy	1–2, 4–5
(France) WR Salini	WR LMP2008	Zytek ZG348 3.4 L V8	D	37	(France) Bruce Jouanny	3
(France) Pegasus Racing	Courage LC75	AER P07 2.0 L Turbo I4	A	38	(France) Julien Schell	1–2, 4–5
(France) Pegasus Racing	Courage LC75	AER P07 2.0 L Turbo I4	A	38	(France) Philippe Thirion	1–2, 4–5
(France) Pegasus Racing	Courage LC75	AER P07 2.0 L Turbo I4	A	38	(Switzerland) Jean-Christophe Metz	4–5
(Germany) KSM	Lola B07/46	Mazda MZR-R 2.0 L Turbo I4	D	39	(Hong Kong) Matthew Marsh	1–2
(Germany) KSM	Lola B07/46	Mazda MZR-R 2.0 L Turbo I4	D	39	(Japan) Hideki Noda	1–2
(Germany) KSM	Lola B07/46	Mazda MZR-R 2.0 L Turbo I4	D	39	(Italy) Francesco Sini	1–2
(Portugal) Quifel ASM Team	Ginetta-Zytek GZ09S/2	Zytek ZG348 3.4 L V8	D	40	(Portugal) Miguel Amaral	All
(Portugal) Quifel ASM Team	Ginetta-Zytek GZ09S/2	Zytek ZG348 3.4 L V8	D	40	(France) Olivier Pla	All
(Switzerland) GAC Racing Team	Zytek 07S/2	Zytek ZG348 3.4 L V8	M	41	(France) Claude-Yves Gosselin	1–3, 5
(Switzerland) GAC Racing Team	Zytek 07S/2	Zytek ZG348 3.4 L V8	M	41	(Saudi Arabia) Karim Ojjeh	1–3, 5
(Switzerland) GAC Racing Team	Zytek 07S/2	Zytek ZG348 3.4 L V8	M	41	(Austria) Philipp Peter	1–3, 5
(Italy) Ranieri Randaccio	Lucchini LMP2/08	Nicholson McLaren XB 3.4 L V8	D	42	(Italy) Ranieri Randaccio	1–2
(Italy) Ranieri Randaccio	Lucchini LMP2/08	Nicholson McLaren XB 3.4 L V8	D	42	(Italy) Raffaele Giammaria	1
(Italy) Ranieri Randaccio	Lucchini LMP2/08	Nicholson McLaren XB 3.4 L V8	D	42	(Italy) Glauco Solieri	2
(Spain) Q8 Oils Hache Team	Lucchini LMP2/08	Judd XV675 3.4 L V8	D	43	(Spain) Máximo Cortés	All
(Spain) Q8 Oils Hache Team	Lucchini LMP2/08	Judd XV675 3.4 L V8	D	43	(Italy) Fabrizio Armetta	1
(Spain) Q8 Oils Hache Team	Lucchini LMP2/08	Judd XV675 3.4 L V8	D	43	(Italy) Enrico Moncada	1
(Spain) Q8 Oils Hache Team	Lucchini LMP2/08	Judd XV675 3.4 L V8	D	43	(France) Pierre Combot	2
(Spain) Q8 Oils Hache Team	Lucchini LMP2/08	Judd XV675 3.4 L V8	D	43	(Spain) Nil Montserrat	2
(Spain) Q8 Oils Hache Team	Lucchini LMP2/08	Judd XV675 3.4 L V8	D	43	(Spain) Carmen Jordá	3–5
(Spain) Q8 Oils Hache Team	Lucchini LMP2/08	Judd XV675 3.4 L V8	D	43	(Spain) Fonsi Nieto	3–5
(United Kingdom) Team WFR	Embassy WF01	Zytek ZG348 3.4 L V8	D	45	(United Kingdom) Jody Firth	5
(United Kingdom) Team WFR	Embassy WF01	Zytek ZG348 3.4 L V8	D	45	(United Kingdom) Warren Hughes	5
(United Kingdom) Team WFR	Embassy WF01	Zytek ZG348 3.4 L V8	D	45	(United Kingdom) Darren Manning	5

=== GT1 ===
Entrant	Car	Engine	Tyre	No.	Drivers	Rounds
(France) Larbre Compétition	Saleen S7-R	Ford Windsor 7.0 L V8	M	50	(France) Roland Bervillé	1, 3–5
(France) Larbre Compétition	Saleen S7-R	Ford Windsor 7.0 L V8	M	50	(France) Sébastien Dumez	1, 3–5
(France) Larbre Compétition	Saleen S7-R	Ford Windsor 7.0 L V8	M	50	(Switzerland) Steve Zacchia	1
(France) Larbre Compétition	Saleen S7-R	Ford Windsor 7.0 L V8	M	50	(Belgium) Stéphane Lémeret	3
(France) Larbre Compétition	Saleen S7-R	Ford Windsor 7.0 L V8	M	50	(France) Laurent Groppi	4–5
(Slovakia) ARC Bratislava (Japan) Kaneko Racing	Saleen S7-R	Ford Windsor 7.0 L V8	D	51	(United Kingdom) Paul Daniels	1
(Slovakia) ARC Bratislava (Japan) Kaneko Racing	Saleen S7-R	Ford Windsor 7.0 L V8	D	51	(United Kingdom) Sean Edwards	1
(Slovakia) ARC Bratislava (Japan) Kaneko Racing	Saleen S7-R	Ford Windsor 7.0 L V8	D	51	(Slovakia) Miro Konôpka	1
(Russia) IPB Spartak Racing	Lamborghini Murciélago R-GT	Lamborghini L535 6.0 L V12	M	55	(Netherlands) Peter Kox	1–2
(Russia) IPB Spartak Racing	Lamborghini Murciélago R-GT	Lamborghini L535 6.0 L V12	M	55	(Russia) Roman Rusinov	1
(Russia) IPB Spartak Racing	Lamborghini Murciélago R-GT	Lamborghini L535 6.0 L V12	M	55	(Czech Republic) Erik Janiš	2
(Russia) IPB Spartak Racing	Lamborghini Murciélago R-GT	Lamborghini L535 6.0 L V12	M	55	(Czech Republic) Filip Salaquarda	2
(United Kingdom) Gigawave Motorsport	Aston Martin DBR9	Aston Martin AM04 6.0 L V12	M	60	(Netherlands) Peter Kox	5
(United Kingdom) Gigawave Motorsport	Aston Martin DBR9	Aston Martin AM04 6.0 L V12	M	60	(United Kingdom) Ryan Sharp	5
(Austria) Jetalliance Racing	Aston Martin DBR9	Aston Martin AM04 6.0 L V12	M	66	(Austria) Thomas Gruber	2
(Austria) Jetalliance Racing	Aston Martin DBR9	Aston Martin AM04 6.0 L V12	M	66	(Austria) Lukas Lichtner-Hoyer	2
(Austria) Jetalliance Racing	Aston Martin DBR9	Aston Martin AM04 6.0 L V12	M	66	(Germany) Alex Müller	2
(France) Luc Alphand Aventures	Chevrolet Corvette C6.R	Chevrolet LS7.R 7.0 L V8	D	72	(France) Yann Clairay	All
(France) Luc Alphand Aventures	Chevrolet Corvette C6.R	Chevrolet LS7.R 7.0 L V8	D	72	(France) Patrice Goueslard	All
(France) Luc Alphand Aventures	Chevrolet Corvette C6.R	Chevrolet LS7.R 7.0 L V8	D	72	(France) Luc Alphand	1–2
(France) Luc Alphand Aventures	Chevrolet Corvette C6.R	Chevrolet LS7.R 7.0 L V8	D	72	(France) Julien Jousse	3–5

=== GT2 ===
Entrant	Car	Engine	Tyre	No.	Drivers	Rounds
(France) IMSA Performance Matmut	Porsche 997 GT3-RSR	Porsche M97/77 3.8 L Flat-6	M	76	(France) Raymond Narac	All
(France) IMSA Performance Matmut	Porsche 997 GT3-RSR	Porsche M97/77 3.8 L Flat-6	M	76	(France) Patrick Pilet	All
(Germany) Team Felbermayr-Proton	Porsche 997 GT3-RSR	Porsche M97/77 3.8 L Flat-6	M	77	(Germany) Marc Lieb	All
(Germany) Team Felbermayr-Proton	Porsche 997 GT3-RSR	Porsche M97/77 3.8 L Flat-6	M	77	(Austria) Richard Lietz	All
(Germany) Team Felbermayr-Proton	Porsche 997 GT3-RSR	Porsche M97/77 3.8 L Flat-6	M	77	(Austria) Horst Felbermayr Sr.	2, 5
(Germany) Team Felbermayr-Proton	Porsche 997 GT3-RSR	Porsche M97/77 3.8 L Flat-6	M	88	(Portugal) Francisco Cruz Martins	All
(Germany) Team Felbermayr-Proton	Porsche 997 GT3-RSR	Porsche M97/77 3.8 L Flat-6	M	88	(Austria) Horst Felbermayr Jr.	All
(Germany) Team Felbermayr-Proton	Porsche 997 GT3-RSR	Porsche M97/77 3.8 L Flat-6	M	88	(Germany) Christian Ried	All
(Italy) Advanced Engineering	Ferrari F430 GT2	Ferrari F136 GT 4.0 L V8	M	78	(United Kingdom) Peter Bamford	2, 4–5
(Italy) Advanced Engineering	Ferrari F430 GT2	Ferrari F136 GT 4.0 L V8	M	78	(Republic of Ireland) Matt Griffin	2, 4–5
(Germany) Reiter Engineering	Lamborghini Gallardo LP560	Lamborghini CEH 5.2 L V10	M	79	(France) Christophe Bouchut	2
(Germany) Reiter Engineering	Lamborghini Gallardo LP560	Lamborghini CEH 5.2 L V10	M	79	(Germany) Albert von Thurn und Taxis	2
(Italy) Easyrace	Ferrari F430 GT2	Ferrari F136GT 4.0 L V8	P	81	(Italy) Paolo Maurice Basso	All
(Italy) Easyrace	Ferrari F430 GT2	Ferrari F136GT 4.0 L V8	P	81	(Italy) Roberto Plati	All
(Italy) Easyrace	Ferrari F430 GT2	Ferrari F136GT 4.0 L V8	P	81	(Italy) Gianpaolo Tenchini	All
(United Kingdom) Team Modena	Ferrari F430 GT2	Ferrari F136 GT 4.0 L V8	M	84	(Spain) Antonio García	All
(United Kingdom) Team Modena	Ferrari F430 GT2	Ferrari F136 GT 4.0 L V8	M	84	(United Kingdom) Leo Mansell	All
(United Kingdom) Team Modena	Ferrari F430 GT2	Ferrari F136 GT 4.0 L V8	M	84	(Brazil) Jaime Melo	2–3, 5
(United Kingdom) Team Modena	Ferrari F430 GT2	Ferrari F136 GT 4.0 L V8	M	84	(Finland) Toni Vilander	4
(Netherlands) Snoras Spyker Squadron	Spyker C8 Laviolette GT2-R	Audi 4.2 L V8	M	85	(Netherlands) Tom Coronel	All
(Netherlands) Snoras Spyker Squadron	Spyker C8 Laviolette GT2-R	Audi 4.2 L V8	M	85	(Switzerland) Benjamin Leuenberger	1
(Netherlands) Snoras Spyker Squadron	Spyker C8 Laviolette GT2-R	Audi 4.2 L V8	M	85	(United Kingdom) Peter Dumbreck	2
(Netherlands) Snoras Spyker Squadron	Spyker C8 Laviolette GT2-R	Audi 4.2 L V8	M	85	(Czech Republic) Jaroslav Janiš	3–5
(United Kingdom) Drayson Racing	Aston Martin V8 Vantage GT2	Aston Martin AM05 4.5 L V8	M	87	(United Kingdom) Jonny Cocker	All
(United Kingdom) Drayson Racing	Aston Martin V8 Vantage GT2	Aston Martin AM05 4.5 L V8	M	87	(United Kingdom) Paul Drayson	All
(Germany) Hankook Farnbacher Racing	Ferrari F430 GT2	Ferrari F136 GT 4.0 L V8	H	89	(Denmark) Allan Simonsen	1–4
(Germany) Hankook Farnbacher Racing	Ferrari F430 GT2	Ferrari F136 GT 4.0 L V8	H	89	(San Marino) Christian Montanari	1, 5
(Germany) Hankook Farnbacher Racing	Ferrari F430 GT2	Ferrari F136 GT 4.0 L V8	H	89	(Germany) Pierre Kaffer	2–5
(Germany) FBR	Ferrari F430 GT2	Ferrari F136 GT 4.0 L V8	M	90	(Germany) Pierre Ehret	All
(Germany) FBR	Ferrari F430 GT2	Ferrari F136 GT 4.0 L V8	M	90	(France) Anthony Beltoise	1, 3–5
(Germany) FBR	Ferrari F430 GT2	Ferrari F136 GT 4.0 L V8	M	90	(Germany) Dominik Farnbacher	2–5
(Germany) FBR	Ferrari F430 GT2	Ferrari F136 GT 4.0 L V8	M	91	(Italy) Andrea Montermini	1–2, 4–5
(Germany) FBR	Ferrari F430 GT2	Ferrari F136 GT 4.0 L V8	M	91	(Italy) Gabrio Rosa	1–2, 4–5
(Germany) FBR	Ferrari F430 GT2	Ferrari F136 GT 4.0 L V8	M	91	(Italy) Giacomo Petrobelli	1–2
(Germany) FBR	Ferrari F430 GT2	Ferrari F136 GT 4.0 L V8	M	91	(Italy) Giacomo Ricci	4
(Germany) FBR	Ferrari F430 GT2	Ferrari F136 GT 4.0 L V8	M	91	(Italy) Niki Cadei	5
(United Kingdom) JMW Motorsport	Ferrari F430 GT2	Ferrari F136 GT 4.0 L V8	D	92	(United Kingdom) Rob Bell	All
(United Kingdom) JMW Motorsport	Ferrari F430 GT2	Ferrari F136 GT 4.0 L V8	D	92	(Italy) Gianmaria Bruni	All
(Belgium) Prospeed Competition	Porsche 997 GT3-RSR	Porsche M97/77 3.8 L Flat-6	M	94	(United Kingdom) Paul Daniels	2
(Belgium) Prospeed Competition	Porsche 997 GT3-RSR	Porsche M97/77 3.8 L Flat-6	M	94	(Finland) Markus Palttala	2
(United Kingdom) James Watt Automotive	Porsche 997 GT3-RSR	Porsche M97/77 3.8 L Flat-6	D	95	(United Kingdom) Paul Daniels	5
(United Kingdom) James Watt Automotive	Porsche 997 GT3-RSR	Porsche M97/77 3.8 L Flat-6	D	95	(United Kingdom) Martin Rich	5
(United Kingdom) James Watt Automotive	Porsche 997 GT3-RSR	Porsche M97/77 3.8 L Flat-6	D	95	(Finland) Markus Palttala	5
(United Kingdom) Virgo Motorsport	Ferrari F430 GT2	Ferrari F136 GT 4.0 L V8	D	96	(United Kingdom) Michael McInerney	1–2
(United Kingdom) Virgo Motorsport	Ferrari F430 GT2	Ferrari F136 GT 4.0 L V8	D	96	(United Kingdom) Sean McInerney	1–2
(United Kingdom) Virgo Motorsport	Ferrari F430 GT2	Ferrari F136 GT 4.0 L V8	D	96	(Netherlands) Michael Vergers	1–2
(Monaco) JMB Racing	Ferrari F430 GT2	Ferrari F136 GT 4.0 L V8	M	99	(United Kingdom) John Hartshorne	All
(Monaco) JMB Racing	Ferrari F430 GT2	Ferrari F136 GT 4.0 L V8	M	99	(France) Romain Iannetta	1
(Monaco) JMB Racing	Ferrari F430 GT2	Ferrari F136 GT 4.0 L V8	M	99	(France) Johan-Boris Scheier	1, 4
(Monaco) JMB Racing	Ferrari F430 GT2	Ferrari F136 GT 4.0 L V8	M	99	(Bulgaria) Plamen Kralev	2
(Monaco) JMB Racing	Ferrari F430 GT2	Ferrari F136 GT 4.0 L V8	M	99	(France) Manuel Rodrigues	2
(Monaco) JMB Racing	Ferrari F430 GT2	Ferrari F136 GT 4.0 L V8	M	99	(Portugal) César Campaniço	3
(Monaco) JMB Racing	Ferrari F430 GT2	Ferrari F136 GT 4.0 L V8	M	99	(Germany) Albert von Thurn und Taxis	3
(Monaco) JMB Racing	Ferrari F430 GT2	Ferrari F136 GT 4.0 L V8	M	99	(Netherlands) Peter Kutemann	4–5
(Monaco) JMB Racing	Ferrari F430 GT2	Ferrari F136 GT 4.0 L V8	M	99	(France) Stéphane Daoudi	5

== Season results ==
Overall winners in bold.

Rnd.	Circuit	LMP1 Winning Team	LMP2 Winning Team	GT1 Winning Team	GT2 Winning Team	Results
Rnd.	Circuit	LMP1 Winning Drivers	LMP2 Winning Drivers	GT1 Winning Drivers	GT2 Winning Drivers	Results
1	Catalunya	(United Kingdom) **No. 007 Aston Martin Racing**	(Italy) No. 30 Racing Box	(Russia) No. 55 IPB Spartak Racing	(Germany) No. 77 Felbermayr-Proton	Results
1	Catalunya	(Czech Republic) **Jan Charouz** (Czech Republic) **Tomáš Enge** (Germany) **Stefan Mücke**	(Italy) Matteo Bobbi (Italy) Andrea Piccini (Italy) Thomas Biagi	(Netherlands) Peter Kox (Russia) Roman Rusinov	(Germany) Marc Lieb (Austria) Richard Lietz	Results
2	Spa	(France) **No. 7 Team Peugeot Total**	(Denmark) No. 31 Team Essex	(France) No. 72 Luc Alphand Aventures	(Germany) No. 77 Felbermayr-Proton	Results
2	Spa	(France) **Nicolas Minassian** (France) **Simon Pagenaud** (Austria) **Christian Klien**	(Denmark) Casper Elgaard (Denmark) Kristian Poulsen (France) Emmanuel Collard	(France) Luc Alphand (France) Patrice Goueslard (France) Yann Clairay	(Germany) Marc Lieb (Austria) Richard Lietz (Austria) Horst Felbermayr Sr.	Results
3	Algarve	(France) **No. 16 Pescarolo Sport**	(Portugal) No. 40 Quifel ASM Team	(France) No. 72 Luc Alphand Aventures	(United Kingdom) No. 92 JMW Motorsport	Results
3	Algarve	(France) **Jean-Christophe Boullion** (France) **Christophe Tinseau**	(Portugal) Miguel Amaral (France) Olivier Pla	(France) Julien Jousse (France) Patrice Goueslard (France) Yann Clairay	(United Kingdom) Rob Bell (Italy) Gianmaria Bruni	Results
4	Nürburgring	(United Kingdom) **No. 007 Aston Martin Racing**	(Portugal) No. 40 Quifel ASM Team	(France) No. 50 Larbre Compétition	(Germany) No. 77 Felbermayr-Proton	Results
4	Nürburgring	(Czech Republic) **Jan Charouz** (Czech Republic) **Tomáš Enge** (Germany) **Stefan Mücke**	(Portugal) Miguel Amaral (France) Olivier Pla	(France) Roland Bervillé (France) Sébastien Dumez (France) Laurent Groppi	(Germany) Marc Lieb (Austria) Richard Lietz	Results
5	Silverstone	(France) **No. 10 Team Oreca Matmut AIM**	(Switzerland) No. 33 Speedy Racing Team Sebah	(United Kingdom) No. 60 Gigawave Motorsport	(United Kingdom) No. 92 JMW Motorsport	Results
5	Silverstone	(France) **Olivier Panis** (France) **Nicolas Lapierre**	(Switzerland) Benjamin Leuenberger (France) Xavier Pompidou (United Kingdom) Jonny Kane	(United Kingdom) Ryan Sharp (Netherlands) Peter Kox	(United Kingdom) Rob Bell (Italy) Gianmaria Bruni	Results

== Championship Standings ==
Points were awarded to the top 8 finishers in the order of 10-8-6-5-4-3-2-1. One bonus point was also awarded for winning pole position (denoted by bold). Cars which failed to complete 70% of the winner's distance were not awarded points. Drivers who did not drive for at least 45 minutes did not receive points. Entries which changed an engine prior to the two race minimum were penalized two points, with a four-point penalty for every subsequent engine change.

== Teams Championships ==
The top two finishers in each teams championship earned automatic entry to the 2010 24 Hours of Le Mans.

=== LMP1 Standings ===
Pos	No.	Team	Chassis	Engine	CAT (Spain)	SPA (Belgium)	ALG (Portugal)	NÜR (Germany)	SIL (United Kingdom)	Penalty	Total
1	007	(United Kingdom) Aston Martin Racing	Lola-Aston Martin B09/60	Aston Martin AM04 6.0 L V12	1	3	2	1	3	-2	39
2	16	(France) Pescarolo Sport	Pescarolo 01	Judd GV5.5 S2 5.5 L V10	2	2	1	Ret	10		26
3	10	(France) Team Oreca Matmut AIM	Courage LC70E	AIM YS5.5 5.5 L V10	3						23
3	10	(France) Team Oreca Matmut AIM	Oreca 01	AIM YS5.5 5.5 L V10		Ret	3		1		23
4	009	(United Kingdom) Aston Martin Racing	Lola-Aston Martin B09/60	Aston Martin AM04 6.0 L V12	Ret	5	5	2	4		21
5=	13	(Switzerland) Speedy Racing Team Sebah	Lola B08/60	Aston Martin AM04 6.0 L V12	7	8	Ret	6	2		14
5=	12	(France) Signature Plus	Courage LC70E	Judd GV5.5 S2 5.5 L V10	4	9	6	5	7		14
7	14	(Germany) Kolles	Audi R10 TDI	Audi TDI 5.5 L Turbo V12 (Diesel)	8	6	NC	4	6		12
8=	7	(France) Team Peugeot Total	Peugeot 908 HDi FAP	Peugeot HDi 5.5 L Turbo V12 (Diesel)		1					11
8=	11	(France) Team Oreca Matmut AIM	Courage LC70E	AIM YS5.5 5.5 L V10	Ret						11
8=	11	(France) Team Oreca Matmut AIM	Oreca 01	AIM YS5.5 5.5 L V10		4	3				11
10=	008	(Czech Republic) AMR Eastern Europe	Lola-Aston Martin B09/60	Aston Martin AM04 6.0 L V12				3	9		6
10=	15	(Germany) Kolles	Audi R10 TDI	Audi TDI 5.5 L Turbo V12 (Diesel)	Ret	7	Ret	Ret	5		6
12	23	(United Kingdom) Strakka Racing	Ginetta-Zytek GZ09S	Zytek ZJ458 4.5 L V8	5	12	Ret	Ret	8	-2	4
13	17	(France) Pescarolo Sport	Pescarolo 01	Judd GV5.5 S2 5.5 L V10	6	Ret					3
–	3	(Monaco) Scuderia Lavaggi	Lavaggi LS1	AER P32C 4.0 L Turbo V8		NC		Ret			0
–	22	(United Kingdom) Team LNT	Ginetta-Zytek GZ09S	Zytek ZJ458 4.5 L V8		11					0
–	9	(France) Team Peugeot Total	Peugeot 908 HDi FAP	Peugeot HDi 5.5 L Turbo V12 (Diesel)		10					0
–	5	(United Kingdom) Team LNT	Ginetta-Zytek GZ09S	Zytek ZJ458 4.5 L V8					11	-2	0

=== LMP2 Standings ===
Pos	No.	Team	Chassis	Engine	CAT (Spain)	SPA (Belgium)	ALG (Portugal)	NÜR (Germany)	SIL (United Kingdom)	Penalty	Total
1	40	(Portugal) Quifel ASM Team	Ginetta-Zytek GZ09S/2	Zytek ZG348 3.4 L V8	2	7	1	1	Ret		33
2	33	(Switzerland) Speedy Racing Team Sebah	Lola B08/80	Judd DB 3.4 L V8	7	2	5	7	1	-2	24
3	29	(Italy) Racing Box	Lola B08/80	Judd DB 3.4 L V8	3	DSQ	2	2			23
4	30	(Italy) Racing Box	Lola B08/80	Judd DB 3.4 L V8	1	Ret	4	6		-2	16
5	41	(Switzerland) GAC Racing Team	Zytek 07S/2	Zytek ZG348 3.4 L V8	8	Ret	3	5	5		15
6	24	(France) OAK Racing Team	Pescarolo 01	Mazda MZR-R 2.0 L Turbo I4	6	DNS	8	4	3	-2	13
7	31	(Denmark) Team Essex	Porsche RS Spyder Evo	Porsche MR6 3.4 L V8		1					11
8	35	(France) OAK Racing Team	Pescarolo 01	Mazda MZR-R 2.0 L Turbo I4	5	3	6	3	Ret	-10	9
9	26	(United Kingdom) Bruichladdich-Bruneau Team	Radical SR9	AER P07 2.0 L Turbo I4	4	DSQ	10	Ret	6		8
10	38	(France) Pegasus Racing	Courage LC75	AER P07 2.0 L Turbo I4	Ret	4		8	8		7
11=	37	(France) WR Salini	WR LMP2008	Zytek ZG348 3.4 L V8	9	6	9	Ret	9		3
11=	45	(United Kingdom) Team WFR	Embassy WF01	Zytek ZG348 3.4 L V8					4	-2	3
13	39	(Germany) KSM	Lola B07/46	Mazda MZR-R 2.0 L Turbo I4	Ret	5				-2	2
14	28	(France) Ibañez Racing Service	Courage LC75	AER P07 2.0 L Turbo I4	Ret	Ret	NC	9	7	-2	0
–	43	(Spain) Q8 Oils Hache Team	Lucchini LMP2/08	Judd XV675 3.4 L V8	Ret	NC	Ret	Ret	NC		0
–	32	(France) Team Barazi-Epsilon	Zytek 07S/2	Zytek ZG348 3.4 L V8		DSQ					0
–	42	(Italy) Ranieri Randaccio	Lucchini LMP2/08	Nicholson McLaren XB 3.4 L V8	Ret	Ret				-2	0
–	25	(United Kingdom) RML	Lola B08/86	Mazda MZR-R 2.0 L Turbo I4	Ret	Ret	7	Ret	2	-14	0

=== GT1 Standings ===
Pos	No.	Team	Chassis	Engine	CAT (Spain)	SPA (Belgium)	ALG (Portugal)	NÜR (Germany)	SIL (United Kingdom)	Penalty	Total
1	72	(France) Luc Alphand Aventures	Chevrolet Corvette C6.R	Chevrolet LS7.R 7.0 L V8	2	1	1	2	3		44
2	50	(France) Larbre Compétition	Saleen S7-R	Ford Windsor 7.0 L V8	3		2	1	2		34
3	55	(Russia) IPB Spartak Racing	Lamborghini Murciélago R-GT	Lamborghini L535 6.0 L V12	1	2					18
4	60	(United Kingdom) Gigawave Motorsport	Aston Martin DBR9	Aston Martin AM04 6.0 L V12					1		10
5	66	(Austria) Jetalliance Racing	Aston Martin DBR9	Aston Martin AM04 6.0 L V12		3					7
–	51	(Slovakia) ARC Bratislava Kaneko	Saleen S7-R	Ford Windsor 7.0 L V8	Ret						0

=== GT2 Standings ===
Pos	No.	Team	Chassis	Engine	CAT (Spain)	SPA (Belgium)	ALG (Portugal)	NÜR (Germany)	SIL (United Kingdom)	Penalty	Total
1	77	(Germany) Team Felbermayr-Proton	Porsche 997 GT3-RSR	Porsche M97/77 3.8 L Flat-6	1	1	8	1	7		36
2	92	(United Kingdom) JMW Motorsport	Ferrari F430 GT2	Ferrari F136 GT 4.0 L V8	2	3	1	9	1		35
3	84	(United Kingdom) Team Modena	Ferrari F430 GT2	Ferrari F136 GT 4.0 L V8	5	2	3	8	4		24
4	90	(Germany) FBR	Ferrari F430 GT2	Ferrari F136 GT 4.0 L V8	4	4	4	3	NC		21
5	89	(Germany) Hankook Farnbacher Racing	Ferrari F430 GT2	Ferrari F136 GT 4.0 L V8	3	Ret	5	4	5		20
6	76	(France) IMSA Performance Matmut	Porsche 997 GT3-RSR	Porsche M97/77 3.8 L Flat-6	Ret	6	2	5	3	-2	19
7	85	(Netherlands) Snoras Spyker Squadron	Spyker C8 Laviolette GT2-R	Audi 4.2 L V8	Ret	5	Ret	2	2	-6	14
8=	99	(Monaco) JMB Racing	Ferrari F430 GT2	Ferrari F136 GT 4.0 L V8	6	Ret	6	12	12		6
8=	91	(Germany) FBR	Ferrari F430 GT2	Ferrari F136 GT 4.0 L V8	Ret	Ret		6	6		6
10	88	(Germany) Team Felbermayr-Proton	Porsche 997 GT3-RSR	Porsche M97/77 3.8 L Flat-6	7	11	Ret	7	8		5
11	81	(Italy) Easyrace	Ferrari F430 GT2	Ferrari F136 GT 4.0 L V8	10	Ret	7	11	11		2
12=	87	(United Kingdom) Drayson Racing	Aston Martin V8 Vantage GT2	Aston Martin AM05 4.5 L V8	8	7	Ret	NC	Ret	-2	1
12=	96	(United Kingdom) Virgo Motorsport	Ferrari F430 GT2	Ferrari F136 GT 4.0 L V8	9	8					1
–	78	(Italy) Advanced Engineering	Ferrari F430 GT2	Ferrari F136 GT 4.0 L V8		9		10	10		0
–	95	(United Kingdom) James Watt Automotive	Porsche 997 GT3-RSR	Porsche M97/77 3.8 L Flat-6					9		0
–	94	(Belgium) Prospeed Competition	Porsche 997 GT3-RSR	Porsche M97/77 3.8 L Flat-6		10					0
–	79	(Germany) Reiter Engineering	Lamborghini Gallardo LP560	Lamborghini CEH 5.2 L V10		NC					0

== Drivers Championships ==
=== LMP1 Standings ===
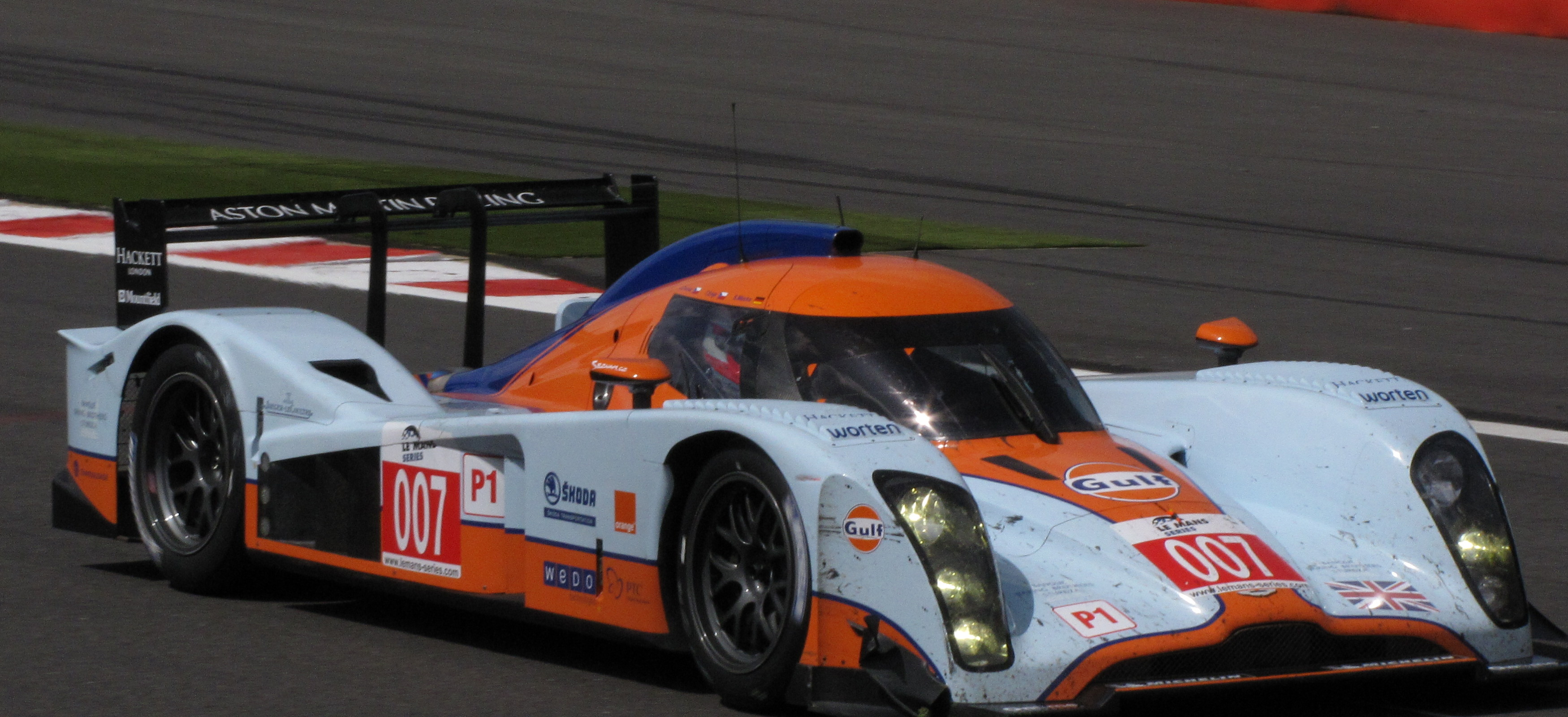
Jan Charouz, Tomáš Enge and Stefan Mücke won the LMP1 class title for Aston Martin Racing.

Pos	Driver	Team	CAT (Spain)	SPA (Belgium)	ALG (Portugal)	NÜR (Germany)	SIL (United Kingdom)	Penalty	Total
1	(Czech Republic) Jan Charouz	(United Kingdom) Aston Martin Racing	1	3	2	1	3	-2	39
1	(Czech Republic) Tomáš Enge	(United Kingdom) Aston Martin Racing	1	3	2	1	3	-2	39
1	(Germany) Stefan Mücke	(United Kingdom) Aston Martin Racing	1	3	2	1	3	-2	39
2	(France) Jean-Christophe Boullion	(France) Pescarolo Sport	2	2	1	Ret	10		26
2	(France) Christophe Tinseau	(France) Pescarolo Sport	2	2	1	Ret	10		26
3	(France) Nicolas Lapierre	(France) Team Oreca Matmut AIM	Ret	4	4		1		22
3	(France) Olivier Panis	(France) Team Oreca Matmut AIM	Ret	4	4		1		22
4	(United Kingdom) Darren Turner	(United Kingdom) Aston Martin Racing	Ret	5	5	2	4		21
4	(Switzerland) Harold Primat	(United Kingdom) Aston Martin Racing	Ret	5	5	2	4		21
5	(Switzerland) Marcel Fässler	(Switzerland) Speedy Racing Team Sebah	7	8	Ret	6	2		14
5	(Italy) Andrea Belicchi	(Switzerland) Speedy Racing Team Sebah	7	8	Ret	6	2		14
5	(France) Nicolas Prost	(Switzerland) Speedy Racing Team Sebah	7	8	Ret	6	2		14
6	(Portugal) Miguel Ramos	(United Kingdom) Aston Martin Racing	Ret	5	5				14
6	(Portugal) Miguel Ramos	(Czech Republic) AMR Eastern Europe				3	9		14
7	(France) Pierre Ragues	(France) Signature Plus	4	9	6	5	7		14
7	(France) Franck Mailleux	(France) Signature Plus	4	9	6	5	7		14
8	(Brazil) Bruno Senna	(France) Team Oreca Matmut AIM	3	Ret	3				12
9	(Netherlands) Charles Zwolsman Jr.	(Germany) Kolles	8	6	NC	4	6		12
9	(United Kingdom) Andrew Meyrick	(Germany) Kolles	8	6	NC	4	6		12
10	(France) Nicolas Minassian	(France) Team Peugeot Total		1					11
10	(France) Simon Pagenaud	(France) Team Peugeot Total		1					11
10	(Austria) Christian Klien	(France) Team Peugeot Total		1					11
11	(India) Narain Karthikeyan	(Germany) Kolles		6	NC	4	6		11
12	(Monaco) Stéphane Ortelli	(France) Team Oreca Matmut AIM	3	Ret					6
13	(Portugal) Tiago Monteiro	(France) Team Oreca Matmut AIM			3				6
14	(United Kingdom) Stuart Hall	(Czech Republic) AMR Eastern Europe				3	9		6
14	(United Kingdom) Chris Buncombe	(Czech Republic) AMR Eastern Europe				3	9		6
15	(Netherlands) Christijan Albers	(Germany) Kolles	Ret	7	Ret	Ret	5		6
15	(Denmark) Christian Bakkerud	(Germany) Kolles	Ret	7	Ret	Ret	5		6
16	(United Kingdom) Nick Leventis	(United Kingdom) Strakka Racing	5	12	Ret	Ret	8	-2	4
16	(United Kingdom) Danny Watts	(United Kingdom) Strakka Racing	5	12	Ret	Ret	8	-2	4
17	(United Kingdom) Peter Hardman	(United Kingdom) Strakka Racing	5	12				-2	3
18	(France) Bruce Jouanny	(France) Pescarolo Sport	6	Ret					3
18	(Portugal) João Barbosa	(France) Pescarolo Sport	6	Ret					3
19	(Switzerland) Giorgio Mondini	(Germany) Kolles		7	Ret	Ret			2
20	(Germany) Michael Krumm	(Germany) Kolles	8						1

=== LMP2 Standings ===
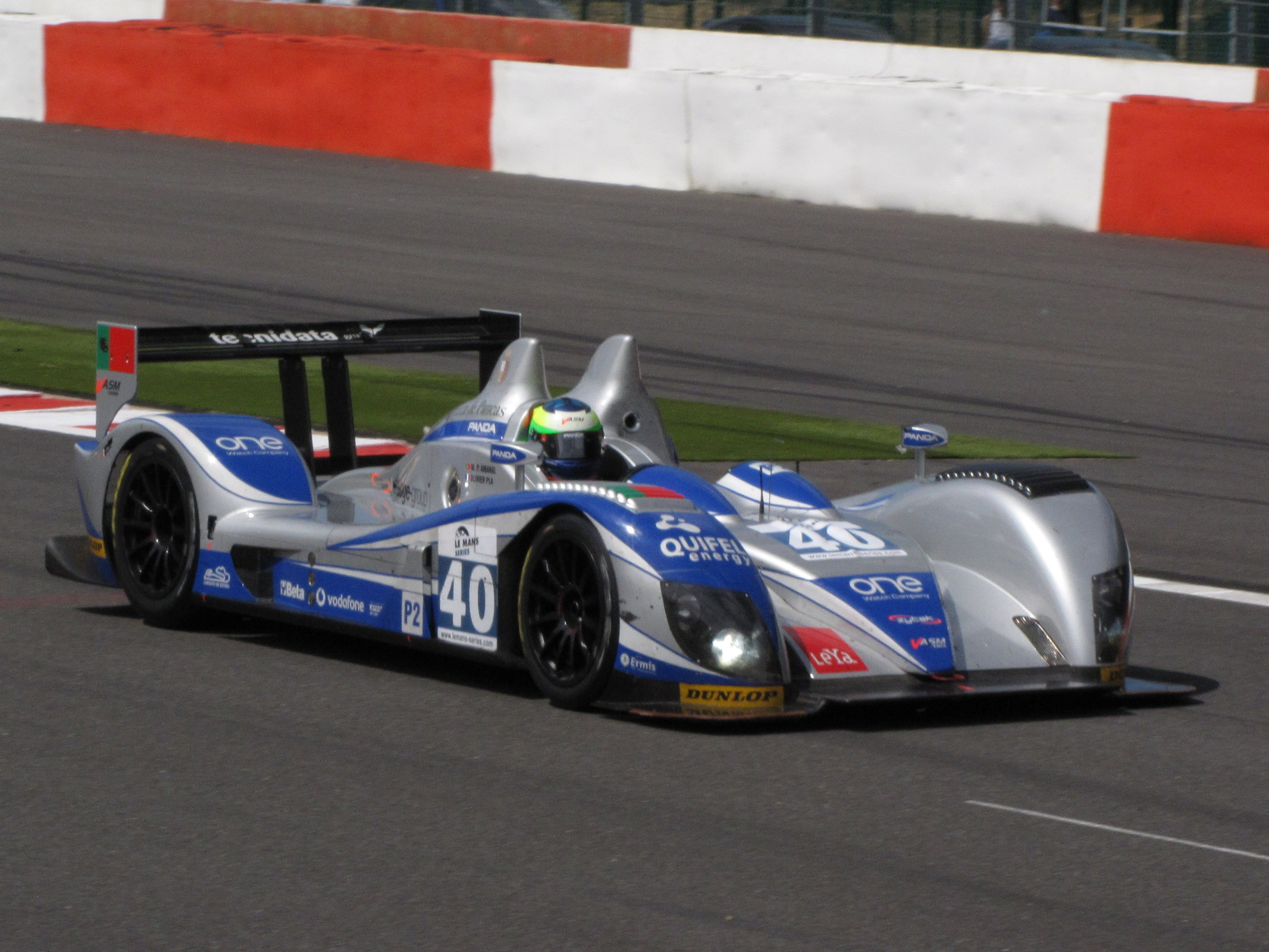
Miguel Amaral and Olivier Pla won the LMP2 class title for Quifel ASM.

Pos	Driver	Team	CAT (Spain)	SPA (Belgium)	ALG (Portugal)	NÜR (Germany)	SIL (United Kingdom)	Penalty	Total
1	(Portugal) Miguel Amaral	(Portugal) Quifel ASM Team	2	7	1	1	Ret		33
1	(France) Olivier Pla	(Portugal) Quifel ASM Team	2	7	1	1	Ret		33
2	(France) Xavier Pompidou	(Switzerland) Speedy Racing Team Sebah	7	2	5	7	1	-2	24
2	(United Kingdom) Jonny Kane	(Switzerland) Speedy Racing Team Sebah	7	2	5	7	1	-2	24
3	(Italy) Andrea Ceccato	(Italy) Racing Box	3	DSQ	2	2			23
3	(Italy) Filippo Francioni	(Italy) Racing Box	3	DSQ	2	2			23
3	(Italy) Giacomo Piccini	(Italy) Racing Box	3	DSQ	2	2			23
4	(Switzerland) Benjamin Leuenberger	(Switzerland) Speedy Racing Team Sebah		2	5	7	1	-2	22
5	(Italy) Matteo Bobbi	(Italy) Racing Box	1	Ret	4	6		-2	16
5	(Italy) Andrea Piccini	(Italy) Racing Box	1	Ret	4	6		-2	16
5	(Italy) Thomas Biagi	(Italy) Racing Box	1	Ret	4	6		-2	16
6	(Saudi Arabia) Karim Ojjeh	(Switzerland) GAC Racing Team	8	Ret	3	5	5		15
6	(Austria) Philipp Peter	(Switzerland) GAC Racing Team	8	Ret	3	5	5		15
7	(France) Jacques Nicolet	(France) OAK Racing	6	DNS	8	4	3	-2	13
7	(Monaco) Richard Hein	(France) OAK Racing	6	DNS	8	4	3	-2	13
8	(Denmark) Casper Elgaard	(Denmark) Team Essex		1					11
8	(Denmark) Kristian Poulsen	(Denmark) Team Essex		1					11
8	(France) Emmanuel Collard	(Denmark) Team Essex		1					11
9	(France) Matthieu Lahaye	(France) OAK Racing	5	3	6	3	Ret	-10	9
9	(Switzerland) Karim Ajlani	(France) OAK Racing	5	3	6	3	Ret	-10	9
10	(France) Pierre Bruneau	(United Kingdom) Bruichladdich-Bruneau Team	4	DSQ	10	Ret	6		8
11	(France) Julien Schell	(France) Pegasus Racing	Ret	4		8	8		7
11	(France) Philippe Thirion	(France) Pegasus Racing	Ret	4		8	8		7
12	(United Kingdom) Stuart Moseley	(United Kingdom) Bruichladdich-Bruneau Team	4	DSQ					5
12	(United Kingdom) Nigel Greensall	(United Kingdom) Bruichladdich-Bruneau Team	4						5
13	(France) Claude-Yves Gosselin	(Switzerland) GAC Racing Team	8	Ret		5	5		5
14	(Italy) Francesco Sini	(Germany) KSM	Ret	5				-2	5
14	(Italy) Francesco Sini	(United Kingdom) Bruichladdich-Bruneau Team			10	Ret	6		5
15	(France) Stéphane Salini	(France) WR Salini	9	6	9	Ret	9		3
15	(France) Philippe Salini	(France) WR Salini	9	6	9	Ret	9		3
15	(France) Tristan Gommendy	(France) WR Salini	9	6		Ret	9		3
16	(United Kingdom) Tim Greaves	(United Kingdom) Bruichladdich-Bruneau Team			10		6		3
17	(United Kingdom) Darren Manning	(United Kingdom) Team WFR					4	-2	3
17	(United Kingdom) Warren Hughes	(United Kingdom) Team WFR					4	-2	3
18	(Japan) Hideki Noda	(Germany) KSM	Ret	5				-2	2
18	(Hong Kong) Matthew Marsh	(Germany) KSM	Ret	5				-2	2
19	(Switzerland) Jean-Christophe Metz	(France) Pegasus Racing				8	8		2
20	(France) José Ibañez	(France) Ibañez Racing Service	Ret	Ret	NC	9	7	-2	0
20	(France) William Cavailhès	(France) Ibañez Racing Service	Ret	Ret	NC	9	7	-2	0
20	(France) Frédéric Da Rocha	(France) Ibañez Racing Service	Ret	Ret	NC	9	7	-2	0

=== GT1 Standings ===
Pos	Driver	Team	CAT (Spain)	SPA (Belgium)	ALG (Portugal)	NÜR (Germany)	SIL (United Kingdom)	Penalty	Total
1	(France) Patrice Goueslard	(France) Luc Alphand Aventures	2	1	1	2	3		44
1	(France) Yann Clairay	(France) Luc Alphand Aventures	2	1	1	2	3		44
2	(France) Roland Bervillé	(France) Larbre Compétition	3		2	1	2		34
3	(Netherlands) Peter Kox	(Russia) IPB Spartak Racing	1	2					28
3	(Netherlands) Peter Kox	(United Kingdom) Gigawave Motorsport					1		28
4	(France) Julien Jousse	(France) Luc Alphand Aventures			1	2	3		25
5	(France) Laurent Groppi	(France) Larbre Compétition				1	2		20
6	(France) Luc Alphand	(France) Luc Alphand Aventures	2	1					19
7	(France) Sébastien Dumez	(France) Larbre Compétition	3		2	1	2		18
8	(Russia) Roman Rusinov	(Russia) IPB Spartak Racing	1						10
9	(United Kingdom) Ryan Sharp	(United Kingdom) Gigawave Motorsport					1		10
10	(Czech Republic) Filip Salaquarda	(Russia) IPB Spartak Racing		2					8
10	(Czech Republic) Erik Janiš	(Russia) IPB Spartak Racing		2					8
11	(Belgium) Stéphane Lémeret	(France) Larbre Compétition			2				8
12	(Austria) Lukas Lichtner-Hoyer	(Austria) Jetalliance Racing		3					7
12	(Austria) Thomas Gruber	(Austria) Jetalliance Racing		3					7
13	(Switzerland) Steve Zacchia	(France) Larbre Compétition	3						6

=== GT2 Standings ===
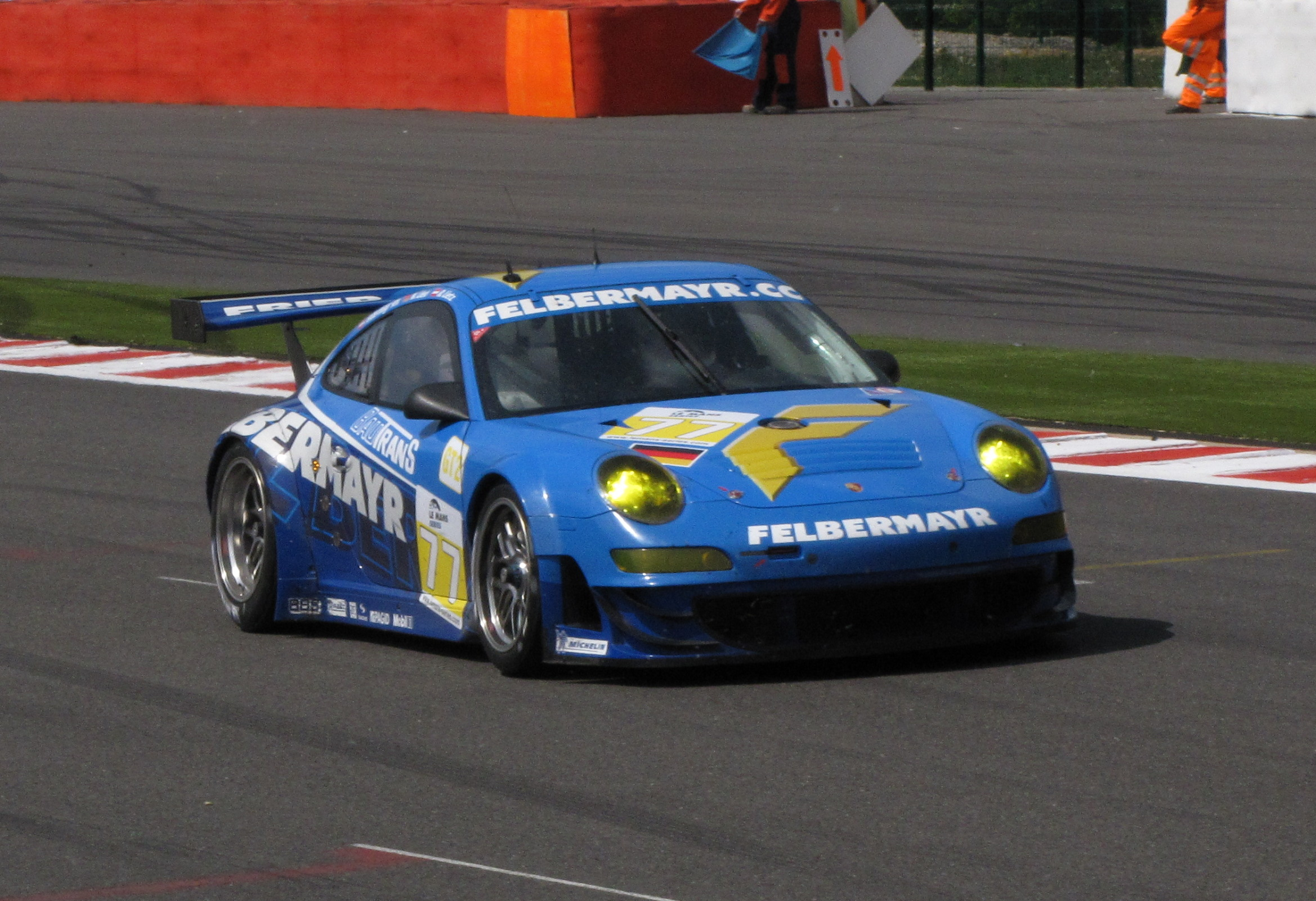
Marc Lieb and Richard Lietz won the GT2 class title for Felbermayr-Proton.

Pos	Driver	Team	CAT (Spain)	SPA (Belgium)	ALG (Portugal)	NÜR (Germany)	SIL (United Kingdom)	Penalty	Total
1	(Germany) Marc Lieb	(Germany) Team Felbermayr-Proton	1	1	8	1	7		36
1	(Austria) Richard Lietz	(Germany) Team Felbermayr-Proton	1	1	8	1	7		36
2	(United Kingdom) Rob Bell	(United Kingdom) JMW Motorsport	2	3	1	9	1		35
2	(Italy) Gianmaria Bruni	(United Kingdom) JMW Motorsport	2	3	1	9	1		35
3	(Spain) Antonio García	(United Kingdom) Team Modena	5	2	3	8	4		24
3	(United Kingdom) Leo Mansell	(United Kingdom) Team Modena	5	2	3	8	4		24
4	(Germany) Pierre Ehret	(Germany) FBR	4	4	4	3	NC		21
5	(Brazil) Jaime Melo	(United Kingdom) Team Modena		2	3		4		19
6	(France) Patrick Pilet	(France) IMSA Performance Matmut	Ret	6	2	5	3	-2	19
6	(France) Raymond Narac	(France) IMSA Performance Matmut	Ret	6	2	5	3	-2	19
7	(Denmark) Allan Simonsen	(Germany) Hankook Team Farnbacher	3	Ret	5	4			16
8	(France) Anthony Beltoise	(Germany) FBR	4		4	3	NC		16
9	(Germany) Dominik Farnbacher	(Germany) FBR		4	4	3	NC		16
10	(Netherlands) Tom Coronel	(Netherlands) Snoras Spyker Squadron	Ret	5	Ret	2	2	-6	14
11	(Germany) Pierre Kaffer	(Germany) Hankook Team Farnbacher		Ret	5	4	5		14
12	(Czech Republic) Jaroslav Janiš	(Netherlands) Snoras Spyker Squadron			Ret	2	2	-6	10
13	(San Marino) Christian Montanari	(Germany) Hankook Team Farnbacher	3				5		10
14	(United Kingdom) John Hartshorne	(Monaco) JMB Racing	6	Ret	6	12	12		6
15	(Italy) Andrea Montermini	(Germany) FBR	Ret	Ret		6	6		6
15	(Italy) Gabrio Rosa	(Germany) FBR	Ret	Ret		6	6		6
16	(Austria) Horst Felbermayr Jr.	(Germany) Team Felbermayr-Proton	7	11	Ret	7	8		5
16	(Germany) Christian Ried	(Germany) Team Felbermayr-Proton	7	11	Ret	7	8		5
16	(Portugal) Francisco Cruz Martins	(Germany) Team Felbermayr-Proton	7	11	Ret	7	8		5
17	(United Kingdom) Peter Dumbreck	(Netherlands) Snoras Spyker Squadron		5					4
18	(France) Johan-Boris Scheier	(Monaco) JMB Racing	6			12			3
18	(France) Romain Iannetta	(Monaco) JMB Racing	6						3
19	(Germany) Albert von Thurn und Taxis	(Germany) Reiter Engineering		NC					3
19	(Germany) Albert von Thurn und Taxis	(Monaco) JMB Racing			6				3
19	(Portugal) César Campaniço	(Monaco) JMB Racing			6				3
20	(Italy) Giacomo Ricci	(Germany) FBR				6			3
21	(Italy) Niki Cadei	(Germany) FBR					6		3
22	(Italy) Maurice Basso	(Italy) Easyrace	10	Ret	7	11	11		2
22	(Italy) Roberto Plati	(Italy) Easyrace	10	Ret	7	11	11		2
22	(Italy) Gianpaolo Tenchini	(Italy) Easyrace	10	Ret	7	11	11		2
23	(United Kingdom) Paul Drayson	(United Kingdom) Drayson Racing	8	7	Ret	NC	Ret	-2	1
23	(United Kingdom) Jonny Cocker	(United Kingdom) Drayson Racing	8	7	Ret	NC	Ret	-2	1
24	(United Kingdom) Sean McInerney	(United Kingdom) Virgo Motorsport	9	8					1
24	(United Kingdom) Michael McInerney	(United Kingdom) Virgo Motorsport	9	8					1
24	(Netherlands) Michael Vergers	(United Kingdom) Virgo Motorsport	9	8					1
25	(Finland) Toni Vilander	(United Kingdom) Team Modena				8			1
