= 2009 1000 km of Algarve =

Layout of the Algarve International Circuit

The 2009 1000 km of Algarve (1000 km do Algarve) was the third round of the 2009 Le Mans Series season. It took place at the Autódromo Internacional do Algarve, Portugal, and was held over the night starting on 1 August 2009 and ending in the early morning of 2 August.

== Race Report ==
=== Qualifying ===
==== Qualifying result ====
Pole position winners in each class are marked in bold.

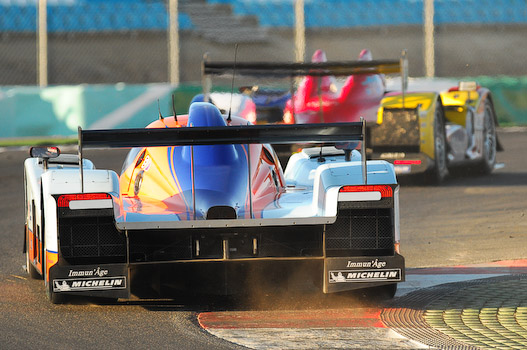
Lola-Aston Martin B09/60 driven by Stefan Mücke in the 1000km do Algarve Race of the Le Mans Series 2009

Pos	Class	Team	Lap Time
1	**LMP1**	**No. 11 Team Oreca Matmut AIM**	**1:31.020**
2	LMP1	No. 007 Aston Martin Racing	1:31.160
3	LMP1	No. 10 Team Oreca Matmut AIM	1:31.236
4	LMP1	No. 23 Strakka Racing	1:31.468
5	LMP1	No. 009 Aston Martin Racing	1:31.556
6	LMP1	No. 15 Kolles	1:32.124
7	LMP1	No. 16 Pescarolo Sport	1:32.232
8	LMP1	No. 14 Kolles	1:32.284
9	LMP1	No. 13 Speedy Racing Team Sebah	1:32.408
10	**LMP2**	**No. 40 Quifel ASM Team**	**1:34.296**
11	LMP1	No. 12 Signature Plus	1:34.328
12	LMP2	No. 25 RML	1:34.728
13	LMP2	No. 41 GAC Racing Team	1:34.752
14	LMP2	No. 29 Racing Box	1:34.948
15	LMP2	No. 33 Speedy Racing Team Sebah	1:35.100
16	LMP2	No. 30 Racing Box	1:35.448
17	LMP2	No. 35 OAK Racing	1:37.076
18	LMP2	No. 37 WR Salini	1:37.088
19	LMP2	No. 24 OAK Racing	1:38.396
20	LMP2	No. 43 Q8 Oils Hache Team	1:39.296
21	LMP2	No. 28 Ibañez Racing Service	1:39.940
22	LMP2	No. 26 Bruichladdich-Bruneau Team	1:40.820
23	**GT1**	**No. 72 Luc Alphand Aventures**	**1:42.052**
24	GT1	No. 50 Larbre Compétition	1:44.028
25	**GT2**	**No. 77 Team Felbermayr-Proton**	**1:44.804**
26	GT2	No. 92 JMW Motorsport	1:44.868
27	GT2	No. 84 Team Modena	1:45.436
28	GT2	No. 76 IMSA Performance Matmut	1:45.744
29	GT2	No. 90 FBR	1:45.808
30	GT2	No. 88 Team Felbermayr-Proton	1:46.080
31	GT2	No. 89 Hankook Team Fernbacher	1:46.380
32	GT2	No. 87 Drayson Racing	1:46.636
33	GT2	No. 99 JMB Racing	1:46.672
34	GT2	No. 81 Easyrace	1:48.412
35	GT2	No. 85 Snoras Spyker Squadron	No Time

=== Race report ===
==== Race results ====
Class winners in bold. Cars failing to complete 70% of winner's distance marked as Not Classified (NC).

Pos	Class	No	Team	Drivers	Chassis	Tyre	Laps
Pos	Class	No	Team	Drivers	Engine	Tyre	Laps
1	**LMP1**	**16**	**(France) Pescarolo Sport**	**(France) Jean-Christophe Boullion (France) Christophe Tinseau**	**Pescarolo 01**	MI	**215**
1	**LMP1**	**16**	**(France) Pescarolo Sport**	**(France) Jean-Christophe Boullion (France) Christophe Tinseau**	**Judd GV5.5 S2 5.5 L V10**	MI	**215**
2	LMP1	007	(United Kingdom) Aston Martin Racing	(Czech Republic) Jan Charouz (Czech Republic) Tomáš Enge (Germany) Stefan Mücke	Lola-Aston Martin B09/60	MI	215
2	LMP1	007	(United Kingdom) Aston Martin Racing	(Czech Republic) Jan Charouz (Czech Republic) Tomáš Enge (Germany) Stefan Mücke	Aston Martin AM04 6.0 L V12	MI	215
3	LMP1	10	(France) Team Oreca Matmut AIM	(Brazil) Bruno Senna (Portugal) Tiago Monteiro	Oreca 01	MI	214
3	LMP1	10	(France) Team Oreca Matmut AIM	(Brazil) Bruno Senna (Portugal) Tiago Monteiro	AIM YS5.5 5.5 L V10	MI	214
4	LMP1	11	(France) Team Oreca Matmut AIM	(France) Olivier Panis (France) Nicolas Lapierre	Oreca 01	MI	212
4	LMP1	11	(France) Team Oreca Matmut AIM	(France) Olivier Panis (France) Nicolas Lapierre	AIM YS5.5 5.5 L V10	MI	212
5	LMP1	009	(United Kingdom) Aston Martin Racing	(United Kingdom) Darren Turner (Switzerland) Harold Primat (Portugal) Miguel Ramos	Lola-Aston Martin B09/60	MI	211
5	LMP1	009	(United Kingdom) Aston Martin Racing	(United Kingdom) Darren Turner (Switzerland) Harold Primat (Portugal) Miguel Ramos	Aston Martin AM04 6.0 L V12	MI	211
6	**LMP2**	**40**	**(Portugal) Quifel ASM Team**	**(Portugal) Miguel Amaral (France) Olivier Pla**	**Ginetta-Zytek GZ09S/2**	D	**207**
6	**LMP2**	**40**	**(Portugal) Quifel ASM Team**	**(Portugal) Miguel Amaral (France) Olivier Pla**	**Zytek ZG348 3.4 L V8**	D	**207**
7	LMP2	29	(Italy) Racing Box	(Italy) Andrea Ceccato (Italy) Filippe Francioni (Italy) Giacomo Piccini	Lola B08/80	MI	205
7	LMP2	29	(Italy) Racing Box	(Italy) Andrea Ceccato (Italy) Filippe Francioni (Italy) Giacomo Piccini	Judd DB 3.4 L V8	MI	205
8	LMP2	41	(Switzerland) GAC Racing Team	(Saudi Arabia) Karim Ojjeh (France) Claude-Yves Gosselin (Austria) Philipp Peter	Zytek 07S/2	MI	205
8	LMP2	41	(Switzerland) GAC Racing Team	(Saudi Arabia) Karim Ojjeh (France) Claude-Yves Gosselin (Austria) Philipp Peter	Zytek ZG348 3.4 L V8	MI	205
9	LMP2	30	(Italy) Racing Box	(Italy) Matteo Bobbi (Italy) Andrea Piccini (Italy) Thomas Biagi	Lola B08/80	MI	203
9	LMP2	30	(Italy) Racing Box	(Italy) Matteo Bobbi (Italy) Andrea Piccini (Italy) Thomas Biagi	Judd DB 3.4 L V8	MI	203
10	LMP1	12	(France) Signature Plus	(France) Pierre Ragues (France) Franck Mailleux	Courage-Oreca LC70E	MI	202
10	LMP1	12	(France) Signature Plus	(France) Pierre Ragues (France) Franck Mailleux	Judd GV5.5 S2 5.5 L V10	MI	202
11	LMP2	33	(Switzerland) Speedy Racing Team (United Kingdom) Sebah Automotive	(Switzerland) Benjamin Leuenberger (France) Xavier Pompidou (United Kingdom) Jonny Kane	Lola B08/80	MI	198
11	LMP2	33	(Switzerland) Speedy Racing Team (United Kingdom) Sebah Automotive	(Switzerland) Benjamin Leuenberger (France) Xavier Pompidou (United Kingdom) Jonny Kane	Judd DB 3.4 L V8	MI	198
12	LMP2	35	OAK Racing; Team Mazda France	(France) Matthieu Lahaye (Switzerland) Karim Ajlani	Pescarolo 01	D	195
12	LMP2	35	OAK Racing; Team Mazda France	(France) Matthieu Lahaye (Switzerland) Karim Ajlani	Mazda MZR-R 2.0 L Turbo I4	D	195
13	LMP2	25	(United Kingdom) RML	(Brazil) Thomas Erdos (United Kingdom) Mike Newton	Lola B08/86	MI	195
13	LMP2	25	(United Kingdom) RML	(Brazil) Thomas Erdos (United Kingdom) Mike Newton	Mazda MZR-R 2.0 L Turbo I4	MI	195
14	**GT1**	**72**	**(France) Luc Alphand Aventures**	**(France) Yann Clairay (France) Patrice Goueslard (France) Julien Jousse**	**Chevrolet Corvette C6.R**	D	**194**
14	**GT1**	**72**	**(France) Luc Alphand Aventures**	**(France) Yann Clairay (France) Patrice Goueslard (France) Julien Jousse**	**Chevrolet LS7.R 7.0 L V8**	D	**194**
15	**GT2**	**92**	**(United Kingdom) JMW Motorsport**	**(United Kingdom) Rob Bell (Italy) Gianmaria Bruni**	**Ferrari F430 GT2**	D	**190**
15	**GT2**	**92**	**(United Kingdom) JMW Motorsport**	**(United Kingdom) Rob Bell (Italy) Gianmaria Bruni**	**Ferrari F136 GT 4.0 L V8**	D	**190**
16	GT2	76	(France) IMSA Performance Matmut	(France) Patrick Pilet (France) Raymond Narac	Porsche 997 GT3-RSR	MI	190
16	GT2	76	(France) IMSA Performance Matmut	(France) Patrick Pilet (France) Raymond Narac	Porsche M97/74 4.0 L Flat-6	MI	190
17	GT2	84	(United Kingdom) Team Modena	(Spain) Antonio García (United Kingdom) Leo Mansell (Brazil) Jaime Melo	Ferrari F430 GT2	MI	189
17	GT2	84	(United Kingdom) Team Modena	(Spain) Antonio García (United Kingdom) Leo Mansell (Brazil) Jaime Melo	Ferrari F136 GT 4.0 L V8	MI	189
18	GT2	90	(Germany) FBR	(Germany) Pierre Ehret (Germany) Dominik Farnbacher (France) Anthony Beltoise	Ferrari F430 GT2	MI	188
18	GT2	90	(Germany) FBR	(Germany) Pierre Ehret (Germany) Dominik Farnbacher (France) Anthony Beltoise	Ferrari F136 GT 4.0 L V8	MI	188
19	GT2	89	(Germany) Hankook Team Farnbacher	(Denmark) Allan Simonsen (Germany) Pierre Kaffer	Ferrari F430 GT2	HK	187
19	GT2	89	(Germany) Hankook Team Farnbacher	(Denmark) Allan Simonsen (Germany) Pierre Kaffer	Ferrari F136 GT 4.0 L V8	HK	187
20	GT2	99	(Monaco) JMB Racing	(United Kingdom) John Hartshorne (Portugal) César Campaniço (Germany) Albert von Thurn und Taxis	Ferrari F430 GT2	MI	182
20	GT2	99	(Monaco) JMB Racing	(United Kingdom) John Hartshorne (Portugal) César Campaniço (Germany) Albert von Thurn und Taxis	Ferrari F136 GT 4.0 L V8	MI	182
21	LMP2	24	OAK Racing; Team Mazda France	(France) Jacques Nicolet (Monaco) Richard Hein	Pescarolo 01	D	179
21	LMP2	24	OAK Racing; Team Mazda France	(France) Jacques Nicolet (Monaco) Richard Hein	Mazda MZR-R 2.0 L Turbo I4	D	179
22	GT2	81	(Italy) Easyrace	(Italy) Maurice Basso (Italy) Roberto Plati (Italy) Gianpaolo Tenchini	Ferrari F430 GT2	P	179
22	GT2	81	(Italy) Easyrace	(Italy) Maurice Basso (Italy) Roberto Plati (Italy) Gianpaolo Tenchini	Ferrari F136 GT 4.0 L V8	P	179
23	GT1	50	(France) Larbre Compétition	(France) Roland Berville (France) Sébastien Dumez (Belgium) Stéphane Lémeret	Saleen S7-R	MI	172
23	GT1	50	(France) Larbre Compétition	(France) Roland Berville (France) Sébastien Dumez (Belgium) Stéphane Lémeret	Ford Windsor 7.0 L V8	MI	172
24	LMP2	37	(France) WR Salini	(France) Stéphane Salini (France) Philippe Salini (France) Bruce Jouanny	WR LMP2008	D	171
24	LMP2	37	(France) WR Salini	(France) Stéphane Salini (France) Philippe Salini (France) Bruce Jouanny	Zytek ZG348 3.4 L V8	D	171
25	LMP2	26	(United Kingdom) Bruichladdich-Bruneau Team	(France) Pierre Bruneau (United Kingdom) Tim Greaves (Italy) Francesco Sini	Radical SR9	D	165
25	LMP2	26	(United Kingdom) Bruichladdich-Bruneau Team	(France) Pierre Bruneau (United Kingdom) Tim Greaves (Italy) Francesco Sini	AER P07 2.0 L Turbo I4	D	165
26	GT2	77	(Germany) Team Felbermayr-Proton	(Germany) Marc Lieb (Austria) Richard Lietz	Porsche 997 GT3-RSR	MI	153
26	GT2	77	(Germany) Team Felbermayr-Proton	(Germany) Marc Lieb (Austria) Richard Lietz	Porsche M97/74 4.0 L Flat-6	MI	153
27 NC	LMP1	14	(Germany) Kolles	(India) Narain Karthikeyan (United Kingdom) Andrew Meyrick (Netherlands) Charles Zwolsman Jr.	Audi R10 TDI	MI	149
27 NC	LMP1	14	(Germany) Kolles	(India) Narain Karthikeyan (United Kingdom) Andrew Meyrick (Netherlands) Charles Zwolsman Jr.	Audi TDI 5.5 L Turbo V12 (Diesel)	MI	149
28 NC	LMP2	28	(France) Ibañez Racing Service	(France) José Ibañez (France) William Cavailhès (France) Frédéric Da Rocha	Courage LC75	D	124
28 NC	LMP2	28	(France) Ibañez Racing Service	(France) José Ibañez (France) William Cavailhès (France) Frédéric Da Rocha	AER P07 2.0 L Turbo I4	D	124
29 DNF	LMP1	15	(Germany) Kolles	(Netherlands) Christijan Albers (Denmark) Christian Bakkerud (Switzerland) Giorgio Mondini	Audi R10 TDI	MI	180
29 DNF	LMP1	15	(Germany) Kolles	(Netherlands) Christijan Albers (Denmark) Christian Bakkerud (Switzerland) Giorgio Mondini	Audi TDI 5.5 L Turbo V12 (Diesel)	MI	180
30 DNF	GT2	85	(Netherlands) Snoras Spyker Squadron	(Netherlands) Tom Coronel (Czech Republic) Jaroslav Janiš	Spyker C8 Laviolette GT2-R	MI	163
30 DNF	GT2	85	(Netherlands) Snoras Spyker Squadron	(Netherlands) Tom Coronel (Czech Republic) Jaroslav Janiš	Audi 4.0 L V8	MI	163
31 DNF	LMP2	43	(Spain) Q8 Oils Hache Team	(Spain) Máximo Cortés (Spain) Fonsi Nieto (Spain) Carmen Jordá	Lucchini LMP2/08	D	90
31 DNF	LMP2	43	(Spain) Q8 Oils Hache Team	(Spain) Máximo Cortés (Spain) Fonsi Nieto (Spain) Carmen Jordá	Judd XV675 3.4 L V8	D	90
32 DNF	LMP1	23	(United Kingdom) Strakka Racing	(United Kingdom) Nick Leventis (United Kingdom) Danny Watts	Ginetta-Zytek GZ09S	MI	67
32 DNF	LMP1	23	(United Kingdom) Strakka Racing	(United Kingdom) Nick Leventis (United Kingdom) Danny Watts	Zytek ZJ458 4.5 L V8	MI	67
33 DNF	GT2	87	(United Kingdom) Drayson Racing	(United Kingdom) Paul Drayson (United Kingdom) Jonny Cocker	Aston Martin V8 Vantage GT2	MI	47
33 DNF	GT2	87	(United Kingdom) Drayson Racing	(United Kingdom) Paul Drayson (United Kingdom) Jonny Cocker	Aston Martin AM05 4.5 L V8	MI	47
34 DNF	LMP1	13	(Switzerland) Speedy Racing Team (United Kingdom) Sebah Automotive	(Switzerland) Marcel Fässler (Italy) Andrea Belicchi (France) Nicolas Prost	Lola B08/60	MI	30
34 DNF	LMP1	13	(Switzerland) Speedy Racing Team (United Kingdom) Sebah Automotive	(Switzerland) Marcel Fässler (Italy) Andrea Belicchi (France) Nicolas Prost	Aston Martin AM04 6.0 L V12	MI	30
35 DNF	GT2	88	(Germany) Team Felbermayr-Proton	(Austria) Horst Felbermayr Jr. (Germany) Christian Ried (Portugal) Francisco Cruz Martins	Porsche 997 GT3-RSR	MI	1
35 DNF	GT2	88	(Germany) Team Felbermayr-Proton	(Austria) Horst Felbermayr Jr. (Germany) Christian Ried (Portugal) Francisco Cruz Martins	Porsche M97/74 4.0 L Flat-6	MI	1

Le Mans Series
Previous race: 1000 km of Spa	2009 season	Next race: 1000 km of Nürburgring
