= Lucchini LMP2 =

Sports prototype race car

Lucchini LMP2/04 Lucchini LMP2/08
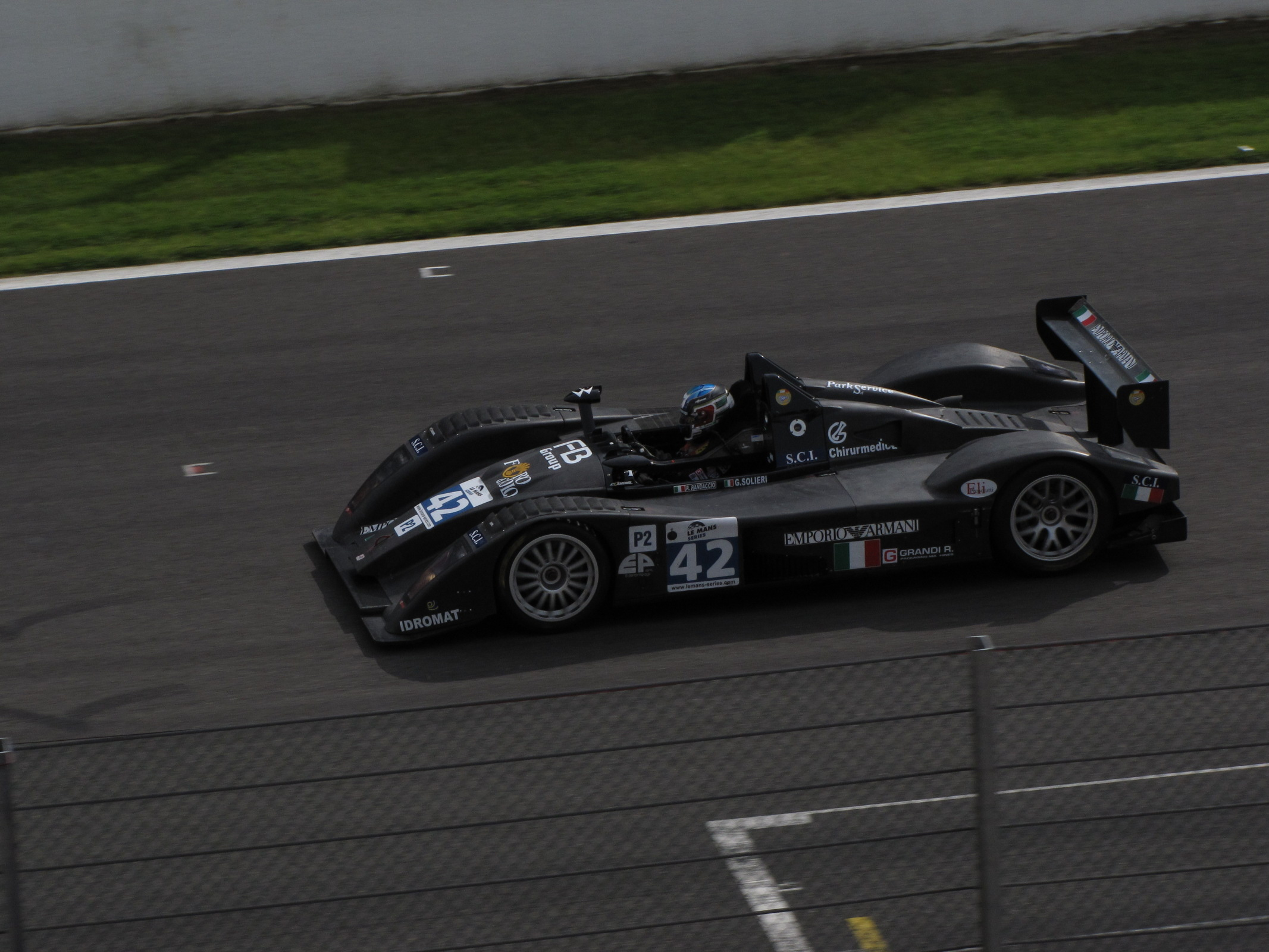
- Lucchini LMP2/08 at the 2009 1000 km of Spa
- Category: Le Mans Prototype 2 (LMP2)
- Predecessor: Lucchini SR2002

Technical specifications
- Chassis: Carbon composite monocoque
- Length: LMP2/04: 4,500 mm (177.2 in); LMP2/08: 4,620 mm (181.9 in)
- Width: LMP2/04:1,920 mm (75.6 in); LMP2/08: 1,900 mm (74.8 in)
- Height: LMP2/04:1,210 mm (47.6 in); LMP2/08: 1,050 mm (41.3 in)
- Wheelbase: LMP2/04: 2,540 mm (100.0 in); LMP2/08: 2,580 mm (101.6 in)
- Engine: Judd XV675 3,395 cc (3.4 L; 207.2 cu in) V8 naturally aspirated mid-engined, longitudinally mounted Nicholson McLaren XB 3,500 cc (3.5 L; 213.6 cu in) V8 naturally aspirated mid-engined, longitudinally mounted
- Torque: 475 N⋅m (350 lb⋅ft)
- Transmission: LMP2/04: Pankl 6-speed sequential manual LMP2/08: Xtrac 6-speed sequential manual
- Power: 540 hp (400 kW)
- Weight: LMP2/04: 720 kg (1,590 lb); LMP2/08: 825 kg (1,819 lb)
- Tires: Dunlop; Pirelli

Competition history
- Debut: 2004 1000 km of Spa
- Last event: 2009 1000 km of Silverstone
Races	Wins	Podiums	Poles	F/Laps
20	0	0	0	0

The Lucchini LMP2 is a series of Le Mans Prototype race cars, designed, developed, and built by Italian manufacturer Lucchini Engineering, for sports car racing, conforming to the FIA's LMP2 class, and produced between 2004 and 2009. A total of three chassis were built.

== Developmental history ==
=== LMP2/04 ===
In July 2003, Lucchini Engineering announced they would build an LMP2 sports prototype complying with the new 2004 Le Mans Prototype regulations. The Italian firm decided to design the car from the ground up, instead of adapting an older SR2 to the new rules. The car utilizes the 3.4-litre Judd XV675 V8 engine and a carbon fiber chassis.

Initial testing was conducted at Misano World Circuit with Filippo Francioni, Piergiuseppe Peroni and Mirko Savoldi all taking turns aboard the LMP2/04. The car was reported to be prone to understeer and had multiple small issues throughout the day including, the gearbox, seat, clutch and fuel pump. Lucchini then had a test at Circuit de Barcelona-Catalunya, where the Pankl gearbox had to be replaced because the oil wasn’t circulating properly. The team replaced it before finding that the new gearbox was also not working. While fixing the broken component, it was discovered the engine oil was also not circulating correctly which could cause significant damage to the engine. The test was ended after only 10 laps.

After the debut of the LMP2/04 at Spa-Francorchamps, more testing was done at the Silverstone Circuit. Electrical issues plagued the day and ultimately ended the test when the car would not restart. Monza was the site of the next testing session for the LMP2/04 where electrical problems arose once again. Another dive plane was added to increase downforce while the brakes received high praise from Francioni. As the Italian was exiting the first chicane, the right rear suspension broke but was recovered and repaired quickly to be sent back out. However, more problems with fuses kept occurring, which resulted in more trips to the pits for a replacement.

Ahead of the 2005 Le Mans Endurance Series season, multiple upgrades were introduced. The rear suspension geometry was modified to improve the tyres’ performance, while a new front bonnet was designed to better fit the front tyres to improve aerodynamics. More testing was done at Dijon-Prenois and the Lausitzring, while the tyre supplier was changed from Pirelli to Dunlop.

=== LMP2/08 ===
For the 2008 LMP2 regulations, Lucchini Engineering updated the old LMP2/04 design to the new rules. The main upgrade compared to the previous car was the Xtrac gearbox instead of the unreliable Pankl. The car was made longer to 4,620 mm (182 in) while the height was shortened to 1,050 mm (41 in). Racing Box tested the LMP2/08 at the Paul Ricard Test Days where the car was in the process of being built by the team. Eventually the car was completed and managed to run 17 laps on the final afternoon. Unfortunately, the changes did little to help the results of the car, failing to classify in any race which it competed.

After the 2009 1000 km of Catalunya, Q8 Oils Hache Team held a two-day test at the same circuit to assess the new rear wing. Máximo Cortés managed to improve the pace of the car by two seconds compared to the race, whilst also focusing on the tune, which had not yet been done.

== Racing history ==
=== 2004 ===
After missing most of the Le Mans Endurance Series season, the Lucchini LMP2/04 made its delayed debut at the final race of the year at Circuit de Spa-Francorchamps. In the hands of the three test drivers, Filippo Francioni, Piergiuseppe Peroni and Mirko Savoldi, the Lucchini Engineering run car set the third best time in its first qualifying session. It was running in the top ten, fighting for a class podium, before it picked up a penalty and struggled to refire. Later on, the car seemingly ran into gearbox troubles which resulted in a fifth place finish in LMP2, 12 laps down from the class leader.

=== 2005 ===
For the Lucchini LMP2/04's sophomore season, Lucchini Engineering entered Peroni and Savoldi into the 2005 1000 km of Spa. During Friday practice, more troubles arose, this time related to fuel pressure. After an engine change, Savoldi set a time of 2.32.273, good enough for fifth in LMP2. Their race ended quite prematurely at just over an hour into the affair, after running over oil left on the track at Les Combes and going off.

Lucchini entered the LMP2/04 into the 2005 24 Hours of Le Mans with the Italian trio of Francioni, Peroni and Savoldi. However, the car was withdrawn days before scrutineering for a gearbox ratio problem that could not be fixed.

The next race at Monza saw no major issues during the buildup to the race with a time of 1.41.877 in qualifying placing fourth in class. The car ran well at the beginning, before it dropped out due to an alternator failure after two hours of running. This wound up being the last entry of the season for the factory squad before the chassis was sold to Ranieri Randaccio.

=== 2006 ===
Ranieri Randaccio entered the car into the first race of the Le Mans Series at Istanbul, for drivers Gianni Collini, Fabio Mancini and himself. The car was now fitted with the Nicholson McLaren XB V8 engine but again ran into gear selection problems in qualifying. It was retired from the race after 26 laps.

At the following race in Spa-Francorchamps, the team qualified 18th overall on a wet but drying track. After 74 laps, the car was pushed back into the garage and retired. The next round at the Nürburgring was much of the same as the previous two races, a retirement just 19 laps in. Whilst appearing on the entry lists for the final two races of the LMS season, the car did not appear in any session.

=== 2007 ===
2007 was the final year of the LMP2/04 which was as poor as its first three seasons. The first race contested was the 1000 km of Spa, where in the first practice session, the engine was "sounding horrible" leaving the Bus Stop. Qualifying went poorly, the car around 12 seconds off the LMP2 pole time. Randaccio and Collini finished the race as non classified, for failing to complete 70% of winner's distance.

The next race at Silverstone was the last for the LMP2/04 in the LMS. Randaccio was joined by Giovanni Lavaggi but they were almost ten seconds slower than the class pole in qualifying. However they would not make the start of the race due to damage to the chassis.

=== 2008 ===
Racing Box entered the LMP2/08 into the Le Mans Series with drivers Marco Didao and Filippo Francioni. At the first race in Barcelona, the team qualified 31st overall with a time of 1.44.579. In the second hour of the race, the car began porpoising and the suspension on the front was damaged. After repairs were made in the pits they eventually finished the race but failed to complete the minimum distance required to be classified. The following race at Monza was another unremarkable one as the car was retired after 115 laps. Whilst appearing on the entry list for the 1000 km of Spa, the team elected to skip the race.

The LMP2/08 was then entered into the 2008 24 Hours of Le Mans by Racing Box with drivers Andrea Ceccato, Francioni and Ferdinando Geri. This entry into the race was despite the car’s suspension issues not solved for the French classic. In the first session of the test weekend, the car's throttle cable snapped on the Mulsanne. It was brought back to the pits for a replacement but only managed to set an abysmal 4:24.058, the fourth slowest time of the day. However, on 10 June, the entry was withdrawn due to the car failing scrutineering. The chassis was found to no longer comply with the homologation done by the FIA in 2004. Giorgio Lucchini submitted documents prior to the test day saying the car was in compliance. The situation changed on 6 June when Lucchini informed the ACO that the certificate was no longer valid.

At the 1000 km of Nürburgring, two LMP2/08s were entered, one each from Racing Box and Ranieri Randaccio. The same scenario occurred again where the cars did not matching the homologation papers.

=== 2009 ===
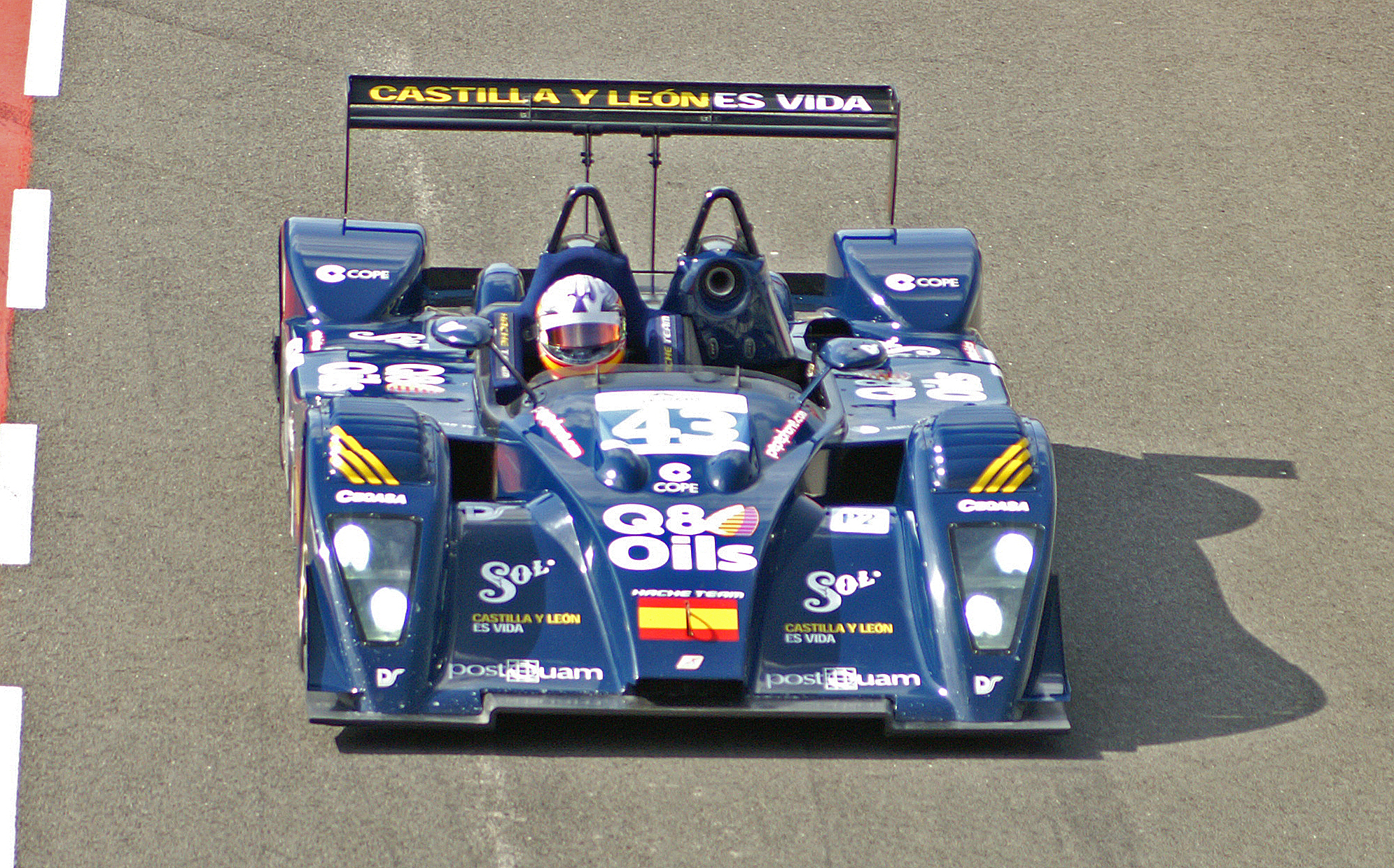
Máximo Cortés, Carmen Jordá and Fonsi Nieto at the 2009 1000 km of Silverstone

For the 2009 Le Mans Series, two LMP2/08s were entered, one Nicholson McLaren and one Judd powered. In the first race at Barcelona, the No. 43 Q8 Oils Hache Team car had smoke from the right rear corner but managed to return to he pits during the first hour. The No. 42 Ranieri Randaccio LMP2/08-Judd retired after 17 laps and the No. 43 entry also retired after 98 laps.

At the 1000 km of Spa, both entries lacked pace in qualifying, the No. 43 around seven seconds off the pace and the No. 42 around 16 seconds. In the race, the Q8 Oils team needed a brake pad change in the first hour, which put them multiple laps down. The No. 42 retired after 35 laps while the No. 43 failed to complete the minimum laps to be classified.

Ranieri Randaccio elected to skip the following race at Algarve and its chassis was eventually retired, while Q8 Oils entered with Máximo Cortés, Carmen Jordá and Fonsi Nieto. The team qualified 20th with a time of 1:39.296. In the third hour, the LMP2/08 suffered a gearbox problem and had a damper replaced. Ultimately, the car did not make the finish, retiring after 90 laps.

The final two races of the season went as expected, a retirement at the Nürburgring 1000 km and a non-classified finish at the Silverstone 1000 km. Whilst originally appearing on the preliminary entry list for the 2010 Le Mans Series season with Hache Team Spain, the team dropped off and the car was never raced again.

== Chassis history ==
A total of three chassis were constructed, one LMP2/04 and two LMP2/08.

=== LMP2/04 ===
#152

- Lucchini Engineering, Judd (2004–2005)
- Ranieri Randaccio, Nicholson McLaren (2006–2007)

=== LMP2/08 ===
#165

- Racing Box, Judd (2008)
- Q8 Oils Hache Team, Judd (2009)

#166

- Ranieri Randaccio, Nicholson McLaren (2008–2009)
