= 2009 1000 km of Nürburgring =

Sports car endurance race in Germany

Nürburgring

The 2009 ADAC 1000 km-Rennen Nürburgring was the fourth round of the 2009 Le Mans Series season. It took place at the Nürburgring GP-Strecke, Nürburg, Germany, on 23 August 2009. Aston Martin Racing, with third entry AMR Eastern Europe, swept the overall podium for this race, led by the No. 007 of Jan Charouz, Tomáš Enge, and Stefan Mücke. Quifel ASM Team led the LMP2 category for the second straight race, while the Larbre Compétition Saleen outlasted its only competition in GT1. The No. 77 Team Felbermayr-Proton Porsche won their third race of the season.

== Report ==
=== Qualifying ===
==== Qualifying result ====
Pole position winners in each class are marked in bold.

Pos	Class	Team	Lap Time
1	**LMP1**	**No. 007 Aston Martin Racing**	**1:41.944**
2	LMP1	No. 009 Aston Martin Racing	1:42.060
3	LMP1	No. 13 Speedy Racing Team Sebah	1:42.570
4	LMP1	No. 23 Strakka Racing	1:42.966
5	LMP1	No. 16 Pescarolo Sport	1:43.196
6	LMP1	No. 12 Signature Plus	1:43.888
7	LMP1	No. 14 Kolles	1:44.010
8	LMP1	No. 15 Kolles	1:45.446
9	**LMP2**	**No. 40 Quifel ASM Team**	**1:45.578**
10	LMP1	No. 008 AMR Eastern Europe	1:45.590
11	LMP2	No. 41 GAC Racing Team	1:46.708
12	LMP2	No. 33 Speedy Racing Team Sebah	1:46.762
13	LMP2	No. 30 Racing Box	1:46.784
14	LMP2	No. 25 RML	1:46.940
15	LMP2	No. 35 OAK Racing	1:47.498
16	LMP2	No. 29 Racing Box	1:48.098
17	LMP2	No. 37 WR Salini	1:48.258
18	LMP2	No. 26 Bruichladdich-Bruneau Team	1:48.930
19	LMP2	No. 24 OAK Racing	1:49.770
20	LMP2	No. 43 Q8 Oils Hache Team	1:51.848
21	LMP2	No. 28 Ibañez Racing Service	1:52.610
22	LMP1	No. 3 Scuderia Lavaggi	1:52.796
23	LMP2	No. 38 Pegasus Racing	1:53.076
24	**GT1**	**No. 50 Larbre Compétition**	**1:55.158**
25	GT1	No. 72 Luc Alphand Aventures	1:55.974
26	**GT2**	**No. 89 Hankook Team Farnbacher**	**1:57.982**
27	GT2	No. 84 Team Modena	1:58.098
28	GT2	No. 77 Team Felbermayr-Proton	1:58.228
29	GT2	No. 92 JMW Motorsport	1:58.436
30	GT2	No. 76 IMSA Performance Matmut	1:58.924
31	GT2	No. 85 Snoras Spyker Squadron	1:59.114
32	GT2	No. 90 FBR	1:59.290
33	GT2	No. 87 Drayson Racing	1:59.442
34	GT2	No. 99 JMB Racing	1:59.666
35	GT2	No. 91 FBR	2:00.272
36	GT2	No. 78 Advanced Engineering	2:00.422
37	GT2	No. 88 Team Felbermayr-Proton	2:01.730
38	GT2	No. 81 Easyrace	2:02.942

=== Race ===
==== Race results ====
Class winners in bold. Cars failing to complete 70% of winner's distance marked as Not Classified (NC).

Pos	Class	No	Team	Drivers	Chassis	Tyre	Laps
Pos	Class	No	Team	Drivers	Engine	Tyre	Laps
1	**LMP1**	**007**	**(United Kingdom) Aston Martin Racing**	**(Czech Republic) Jan Charouz (Czech Republic) Tomáš Enge (Germany) Stefan Mücke**	**Lola-Aston Martin B09/60**	MI	**195**
1	**LMP1**	**007**	**(United Kingdom) Aston Martin Racing**	**(Czech Republic) Jan Charouz (Czech Republic) Tomáš Enge (Germany) Stefan Mücke**	**Aston Martin AM04 6.0 L V12**	MI	**195**
2	LMP1	009	(United Kingdom) Aston Martin Racing	(United Kingdom) Darren Turner (Switzerland) Harold Primat	Lola-Aston Martin B09/60	MI	195
2	LMP1	009	(United Kingdom) Aston Martin Racing	(United Kingdom) Darren Turner (Switzerland) Harold Primat	Aston Martin AM04 6.0 L V12	MI	195
3	LMP1	008	(Czech Republic) AMR Eastern Europe	(Portugal) Miguel Ramos (United Kingdom) Stuart Hall (United Kingdom) Chris Buncombe	Lola-Aston Martin B09/60	MI	193
3	LMP1	008	(Czech Republic) AMR Eastern Europe	(Portugal) Miguel Ramos (United Kingdom) Stuart Hall (United Kingdom) Chris Buncombe	Aston Martin AM04 6.0 L V12	MI	193
4	LMP1	14	(Germany) Kolles	(India) Narain Karthikeyan (United Kingdom) Andrew Meyrick (Netherlands) Charles Zwolsman Jr.	Audi R10 TDI	MI	193
4	LMP1	14	(Germany) Kolles	(India) Narain Karthikeyan (United Kingdom) Andrew Meyrick (Netherlands) Charles Zwolsman Jr.	Audi TDI 5.5 L Turbo V12 (Diesel)	MI	193
5	LMP1	12	(France) Signature Plus	(France) Pierre Ragues (France) Franck Mailleux	Courage-Oreca LC70E	MI	190
5	LMP1	12	(France) Signature Plus	(France) Pierre Ragues (France) Franck Mailleux	Judd GV5.5 S2 5.5 L V10	MI	190
6	**LMP2**	**40**	**(Portugal) Quifel ASM Team**	**(Portugal) Miguel Amaral (France) Olivier Pla**	**Ginetta-Zytek GZ09S/2**	D	**189**
6	**LMP2**	**40**	**(Portugal) Quifel ASM Team**	**(Portugal) Miguel Amaral (France) Olivier Pla**	**Zytek ZG348 3.4 L V8**	D	**189**
7	LMP2	29	(Italy) Racing Box	(Italy) Andrea Ceccato (Italy) Filippe Francioni (Italy) Giacomo Piccini	Lola B08/80	MI	187
7	LMP2	29	(Italy) Racing Box	(Italy) Andrea Ceccato (Italy) Filippe Francioni (Italy) Giacomo Piccini	Judd DB 3.4 L V8	MI	187
8	LMP2	35	OAK Racing; Team Mazda France	(France) Matthieu Lahaye (Switzerland) Karim Ajlani	Pescarolo 01	D	185
8	LMP2	35	OAK Racing; Team Mazda France	(France) Matthieu Lahaye (Switzerland) Karim Ajlani	Mazda MZR-R 2.0 L Turbo I4	D	185
9	LMP2	24	OAK Racing; Team Mazda France	(France) Jacques Nicolet (Monaco) Richard Hein	Pescarolo 01	D	184
9	LMP2	24	OAK Racing; Team Mazda France	(France) Jacques Nicolet (Monaco) Richard Hein	Mazda MZR-R 2.0 L Turbo I4	D	184
10	LMP2	41	(Switzerland) GAC Racing Team	(Saudi Arabia) Karim Ojjeh (France) Claude-Yves Gosselin (Austria) Philipp Peter	Zytek 07S/2	MI	183
10	LMP2	41	(Switzerland) GAC Racing Team	(Saudi Arabia) Karim Ojjeh (France) Claude-Yves Gosselin (Austria) Philipp Peter	Zytek ZG348 3.4 L V8	MI	183
11	LMP2	30	(Italy) Racing Box	(Italy) Matteo Bobbi (Italy) Andrea Piccini (Italy) Thomas Biagi	Lola B08/80	MI	182
11	LMP2	30	(Italy) Racing Box	(Italy) Matteo Bobbi (Italy) Andrea Piccini (Italy) Thomas Biagi	Judd DB 3.4 L V8	MI	182
12	LMP2	33	(Switzerland) Speedy Racing Team (United Kingdom) Sebah Automotive	(Switzerland) Benjamin Leuenberger (France) Xavier Pompidou (United Kingdom) Jonny Kane	Lola B08/80	MI	177
12	LMP2	33	(Switzerland) Speedy Racing Team (United Kingdom) Sebah Automotive	(Switzerland) Benjamin Leuenberger (France) Xavier Pompidou (United Kingdom) Jonny Kane	Judd DB 3.4 L V8	MI	177
13	**GT2**	**77**	**(Germany) Team Felbermayr-Proton**	**(Germany) Marc Lieb (Austria) Richard Lietz**	**Porsche 997 GT3-RSR**	MI	**174**
13	**GT2**	**77**	**(Germany) Team Felbermayr-Proton**	**(Germany) Marc Lieb (Austria) Richard Lietz**	**Porsche M97/74 4.0 L Flat-6**	MI	**174**
14	GT2	85	(Netherlands) Snoras Spyker Squadron	(Netherlands) Tom Coronel (Czech Republic) Jaroslav Janiš	Spyker C8 Laviolette GT2-R	MI	173
14	GT2	85	(Netherlands) Snoras Spyker Squadron	(Netherlands) Tom Coronel (Czech Republic) Jaroslav Janiš	Audi 4.0 L V8	MI	173
15	GT2	90	(Germany) FBR	(Germany) Pierre Ehret (Germany) Dominik Farnbacher (France) Anthony Beltoise	Ferrari F430 GT2	MI	173
15	GT2	90	(Germany) FBR	(Germany) Pierre Ehret (Germany) Dominik Farnbacher (France) Anthony Beltoise	Ferrari F136 GT 4.0 L V8	MI	173
16	GT2	89	(Germany) Hankook Team Farnbacher	(Denmark) Allan Simonsen (Germany) Pierre Kaffer	Ferrari F430 GT2	HK	172
16	GT2	89	(Germany) Hankook Team Farnbacher	(Denmark) Allan Simonsen (Germany) Pierre Kaffer	Ferrari F136 GT 4.0 L V8	HK	172
17	GT2	76	(France) IMSA Performance Matmut	(France) Patrick Pilet (France) Raymond Narac	Porsche 997 GT3-RSR	MI	171
17	GT2	76	(France) IMSA Performance Matmut	(France) Patrick Pilet (France) Raymond Narac	Porsche M97/74 4.0 L Flat-6	MI	171
18	GT2	91	(Germany) FBR	(Italy) Andrea Montermini (Italy) Giacomo Ricci (Italy) Gabrio Rosa	Ferrari F430 GT2	MI	169
18	GT2	91	(Germany) FBR	(Italy) Andrea Montermini (Italy) Giacomo Ricci (Italy) Gabrio Rosa	Ferrari F136 GT 4.0 L V8	MI	169
19	GT2	88	(Germany) Team Felbermayr-Proton	(Austria) Horst Felbermayr Jr. (Germany) Christian Ried (Portugal) Francisco Cruz Martins	Porsche 997 GT3-RSR	MI	169
19	GT2	88	(Germany) Team Felbermayr-Proton	(Austria) Horst Felbermayr Jr. (Germany) Christian Ried (Portugal) Francisco Cruz Martins	Porsche M97/74 4.0 L Flat-6	MI	169
20	GT2	84	(United Kingdom) Team Modena	(Spain) Antonio García (United Kingdom) Leo Mansell (Finland) Toni Vilander	Ferrari F430 GT2	MI	169
20	GT2	84	(United Kingdom) Team Modena	(Spain) Antonio García (United Kingdom) Leo Mansell (Finland) Toni Vilander	Ferrari F136 GT 4.0 L V8	MI	169
21	LMP2	38	(France) Pegasus Racing	(France) Julien Schell (France) Philippe Thirion (Switzerland) Jean-Christophe Metz	Courage-Oreca LC75	A	169
21	LMP2	38	(France) Pegasus Racing	(France) Julien Schell (France) Philippe Thirion (Switzerland) Jean-Christophe Metz	AER P07 2.0 L Turbo I4	A	169
22	GT2	92	(United Kingdom) JMW Motorsport	(United Kingdom) Rob Bell (Italy) Gianmaria Bruni	Ferrari F430 GT2	D	169
22	GT2	92	(United Kingdom) JMW Motorsport	(United Kingdom) Rob Bell (Italy) Gianmaria Bruni	Ferrari F136 GT 4.0 L V8	D	169
23	**GT1**	**50**	**(France) Larbre Compétition**	**(France) Roland Berville (France) Sébastien Dumez (France) Laurent Groppi**	**Saleen S7-R**	MI	**168**
23	**GT1**	**50**	**(France) Larbre Compétition**	**(France) Roland Berville (France) Sébastien Dumez (France) Laurent Groppi**	**Ford Windsor 7.0 L V8**	MI	**168**
24	GT2	78	(Italy) Advanced Engineering	(United Kingdom) Peter Bamford (Republic of Ireland) Matt Griffin	Ferrari F430 GT2	MI	168
24	GT2	78	(Italy) Advanced Engineering	(United Kingdom) Peter Bamford (Republic of Ireland) Matt Griffin	Ferrari F136 GT 4.0 L V8	MI	168
25	GT2	81	(Italy) Easyrace	(Italy) Maurice Basso (Italy) Roberto Plati (Italy) Gianpaolo Tenchini	Ferrari F430 GT2	P	166
25	GT2	81	(Italy) Easyrace	(Italy) Maurice Basso (Italy) Roberto Plati (Italy) Gianpaolo Tenchini	Ferrari F136 GT 4.0 L V8	P	166
26	LMP2	28	(France) Ibañez Racing Service	(France) José Ibañez (France) William Cavailhès (France) Frédéric Da Rocha	Courage LC75	D	161
26	LMP2	28	(France) Ibañez Racing Service	(France) José Ibañez (France) William Cavailhès (France) Frédéric Da Rocha	AER P07 2.0 L Turbo I4	D	161
27	LMP1	13	(Switzerland) Speedy Racing Team (United Kingdom) Sebah Automotive	(Switzerland) Marcel Fässler (Italy) Andrea Belicchi (France) Nicolas Prost	Lola B08/60	MI	156
27	LMP1	13	(Switzerland) Speedy Racing Team (United Kingdom) Sebah Automotive	(Switzerland) Marcel Fässler (Italy) Andrea Belicchi (France) Nicolas Prost	Aston Martin AM04 6.0 L V12	MI	156
28	GT2	99	(Monaco) JMB Racing	(United Kingdom) John Hartshorne (Netherlands) Peter Kutemann (France) Johan Boris-Scheier	Ferrari F430 GT2	MI	142
28	GT2	99	(Monaco) JMB Racing	(United Kingdom) John Hartshorne (Netherlands) Peter Kutemann (France) Johan Boris-Scheier	Ferrari F136 GT 4.0 L V8	MI	142
29	GT1	72	(France) Luc Alphand Aventures	(France) Yann Clairay (France) Patrice Goueslard (France) Julien Jousse	Chevrolet Corvette C6.R	D	138
29	GT1	72	(France) Luc Alphand Aventures	(France) Yann Clairay (France) Patrice Goueslard (France) Julien Jousse	Chevrolet LS7.R 7.0 L V8	D	138
30 NC	GT2	87	(United Kingdom) Drayson Racing	(United Kingdom) Paul Drayson (United Kingdom) Jonny Cocker	Aston Martin V8 Vantage GT2	MI	131
30 NC	GT2	87	(United Kingdom) Drayson Racing	(United Kingdom) Paul Drayson (United Kingdom) Jonny Cocker	Aston Martin AM05 4.5 L V8	MI	131
31 DNF	LMP1	23	(United Kingdom) Strakka Racing	(United Kingdom) Nick Leventis (United Kingdom) Danny Watts	Ginetta-Zytek GZ09S	MI	141
31 DNF	LMP1	23	(United Kingdom) Strakka Racing	(United Kingdom) Nick Leventis (United Kingdom) Danny Watts	Zytek ZJ458 4.5 L V8	MI	141
32 DNF	LMP2	37	(France) WR Salini	(France) Stéphane Salini (France) Philippe Salini (France) Tristan Gommendy	WR LMP2008	D	124
32 DNF	LMP2	37	(France) WR Salini	(France) Stéphane Salini (France) Philippe Salini (France) Tristan Gommendy	Zytek ZG348 3.4 L V8	D	124
33 DNF	LMP2	26	(United Kingdom) Bruichladdich-Bruneau Team	(France) Pierre Bruneau (Netherlands) Michael Vergers (Italy) Francesco Sini	Radical SR9	D	114
33 DNF	LMP2	26	(United Kingdom) Bruichladdich-Bruneau Team	(France) Pierre Bruneau (Netherlands) Michael Vergers (Italy) Francesco Sini	AER P07 2.0 L Turbo I4	D	114
34 DNF	LMP2	43	(Spain) Q8 Oils Hache Team	(Spain) Máximo Cortés (Spain) Fonsi Nieto (Spain) Carmen Jordá	Lucchini LMP2/08	D	75
34 DNF	LMP2	43	(Spain) Q8 Oils Hache Team	(Spain) Máximo Cortés (Spain) Fonsi Nieto (Spain) Carmen Jordá	Judd XV675 3.4 L V8	D	75
35 DNF	LMP2	25	(United Kingdom) RML	(Brazil) Thomas Erdos (United Kingdom) Mike Newton	Lola B08/86	MI	57
35 DNF	LMP2	25	(United Kingdom) RML	(Brazil) Thomas Erdos (United Kingdom) Mike Newton	Mazda MZR-R 2.0 L Turbo I4	MI	57
36 DNF	LMP1	15	(Germany) Kolles	(Netherlands) Christijan Albers (Denmark) Christian Bakkerud (Switzerland) Giorgio Mondini	Audi R10 TDI	MI	40
36 DNF	LMP1	15	(Germany) Kolles	(Netherlands) Christijan Albers (Denmark) Christian Bakkerud (Switzerland) Giorgio Mondini	Audi TDI 5.5 L Turbo V12 (Diesel)	MI	40
37 DNF	LMP1	16	(France) Pescarolo Sport	(France) Jean-Christophe Boullion (France) Christophe Tinseau (France) Emmanuel Collard	Pescarolo 01	MI	35
37 DNF	LMP1	16	(France) Pescarolo Sport	(France) Jean-Christophe Boullion (France) Christophe Tinseau (France) Emmanuel Collard	Judd GV5.5 S2 5.5 L V10	MI	35
38 DNF	LMP1	3	(Monaco) Scuderia Lavaggi	(Monaco) Giovanni Lavaggi (Germany) Wolfgang Kaufmann	Lavaggi LS1	D	21
38 DNF	LMP1	3	(Monaco) Scuderia Lavaggi	(Monaco) Giovanni Lavaggi (Germany) Wolfgang Kaufmann	AER P32C 4.0 L Turbo V8	D	21

Le Mans Series
Previous race: 1000 km of Algarve	2009 season	Next race: 1000 km of Silverstone
