= Courage LC75 =

Le Mans Prototype race car

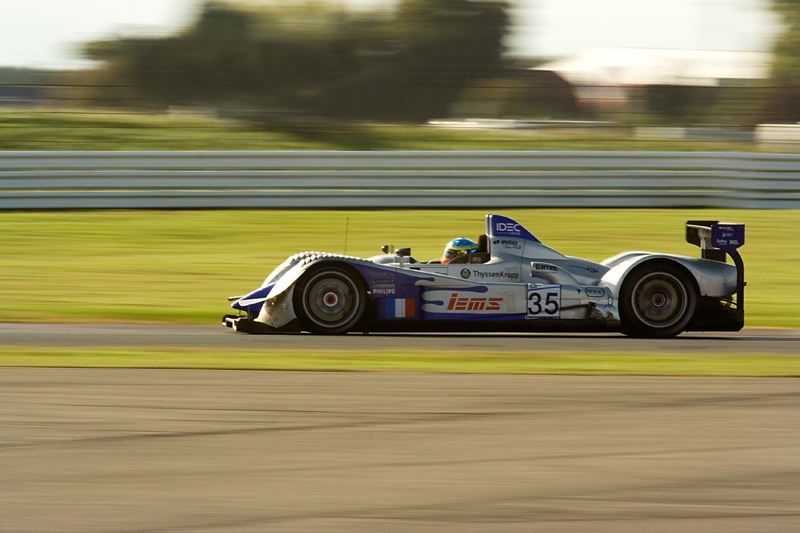
The Saulnier Racing LC75 in 2007

The Courage LC75 is a Le Mans Prototype race car, designed, developed and built by French manufacturer Courage, based on the Courage LC70 LMP1 car, and designed by Courage to compete in the LMP2 class in the Le Mans Series and the 24 Hours of Le Mans.

The car was transformed by HPD (Honda Performance Development) into the American Le Mans Series-winning Acura ARX-01.

== Awards ==
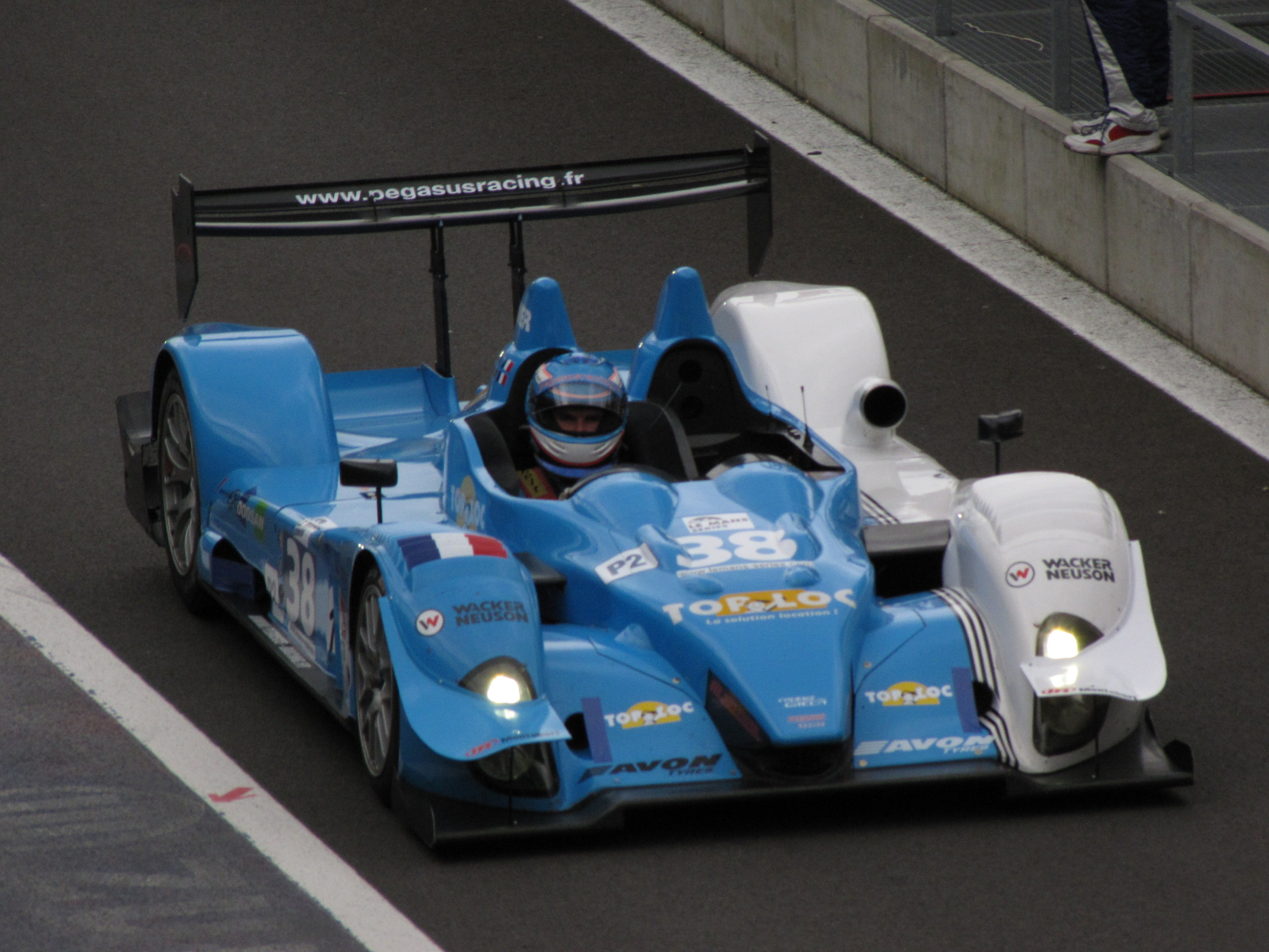
Courage LC75 at the Spa 1000km in 2009

While the LC75 itself wasn't very successful, its evolution, redesigned and engineered by HPD took several titles in the American Le Mans Series. The car did not enjoy the sporting and commercial success of its predecessor the Courage C65.

== Chassis ==
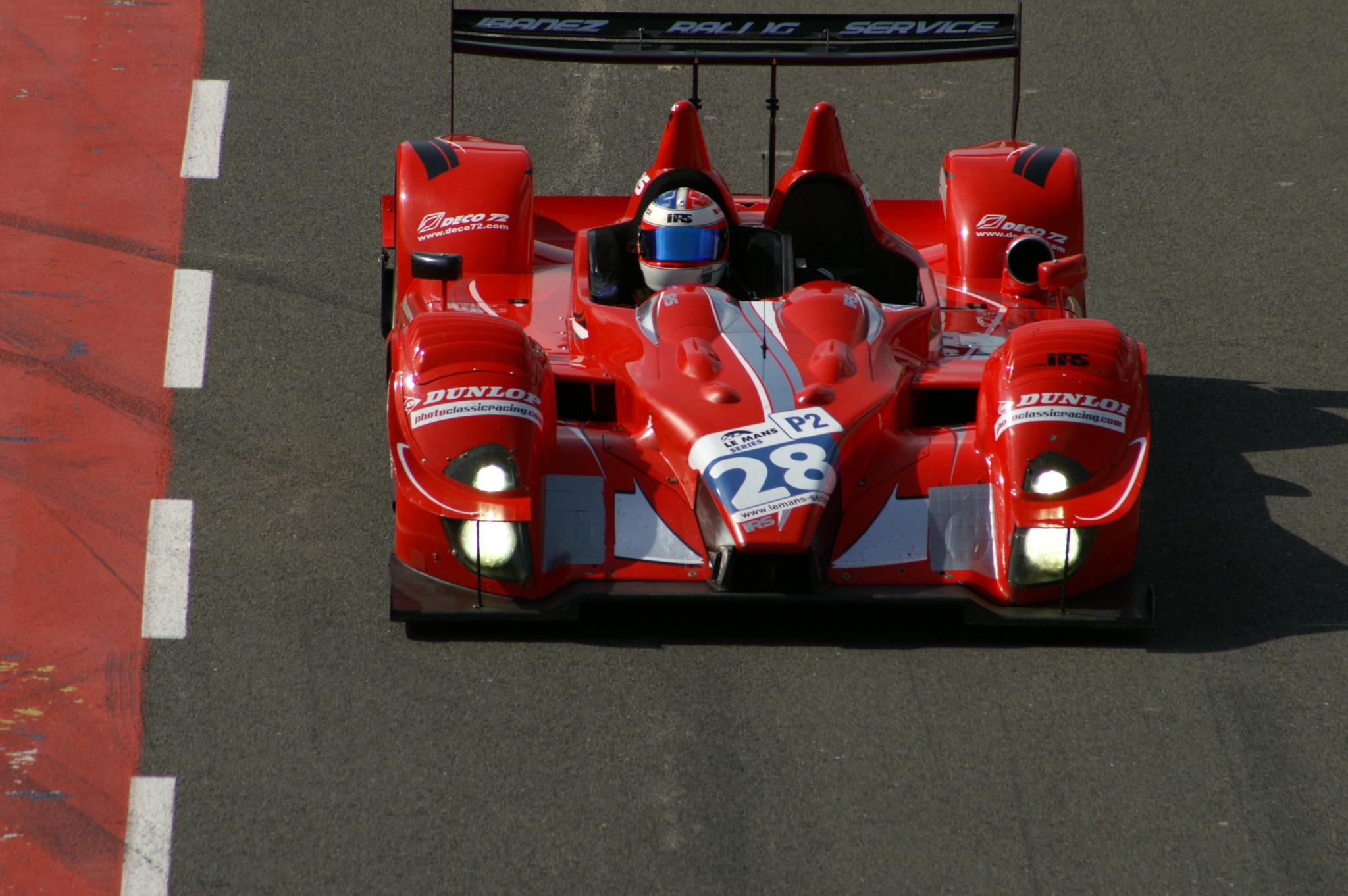
Chassis n°2 of Ibañez Racing Service in 2009

Only two chassis have carried the name LC75, no other LC70 chassis has been configured for the LMP2 category.

Chassis n°1 is the first of the LC70 & LC75 series, it was used in 2006 for driving tests and tune-ups. Noël Del Bello Racing used it in 2007 before it was used again for testing as part of Oreca's development of the FLM09 in 2008. It has been owned by Pegasus Racing since 2009.

Chassis n°2 was purchased by Saulnier Racing, which entered it on behalf of Swiss Spirit in 2006 and under its own name in 2007. After the team was taken over by Jacques Nicolet, the car was replaced by the Pescarolo 01 and is sold to Ibañez Racing Service.

No.	Year	Model	Team	Engine	Championship
1	2006	LC75	Courage Compétition	Mecachrome	No commitment / Use for testing and development
1	2007	LC75	Noël Del Bello Racing	AER P07	Le Mans Series / 24 Hours of Le Mans
1	2008	LC75	Oreca	AER P07	No commitment / Use for testing and development
1	2009-2010	LC75	Pegasus Racing	AER P07	Le Mans Series
1	2011	LC75	Pegasus Racing	HPD V6 bi-turbo	
2	2006	LC70	Swiss Spirit	Judd GV5 V10	Le Mans Series / 24 Hours of Le Mans
2	2007	LC75	Saulnier Racing	Judd GV5 V10	Le Mans Series / 24 Hours of Le Mans
2	2009-2011	LC75	Ibañez Racing Service	AER P07	Le Mans Series
