= Leo Mansell =

British former racing driver (born 1985)

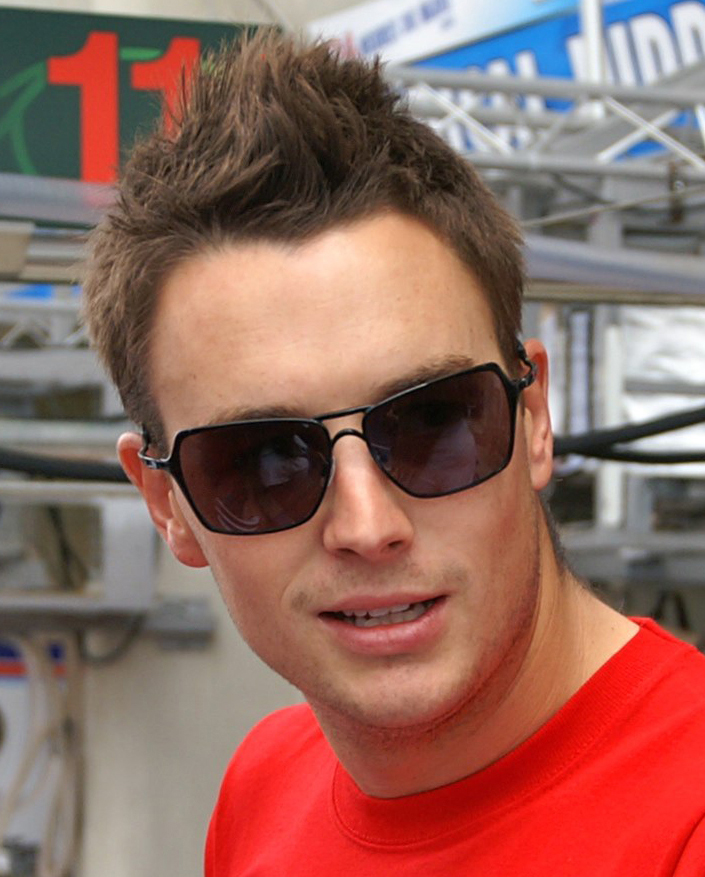
- Mansell in 2010
- Born: Leo James Mansell; 4 January 1985 (age 41); Isle of Man

24 Hours of Le Mans career
- Years: 2009–2010
- Teams: Team Modena, Beechdean Mansell
- Best finish: 27th
- Class wins: 0

Leo James Mansell (born 4 January 1985 on the Isle of Man) is a British former racing driver. He is the son of 1992 Formula One world champion and 1993 PPG Indy Car World Series champion, Nigel Mansell, and elder brother of fellow racing driver Greg Mansell.

== Racing career ==
Leo and his younger brother have always raced in the same series, starting with Karting in 2000. The brothers ascended through the Karting ranks, and moved into single-seater racing in 2006, in the Formula BMW UK series. He was outperformed by his brother Greg, who finished 14th with 24 points, and finished 25th and last with no points.

In the same year the pair were granted drives in the finale of the 2006 British Formula Three Championship at Thruxton, driving for the Fortec Motorsport team, in Invitational Class, with Leo finishing in 14th position in the first race, and then 13th in the second.

In 2007, Leo maintained his seat in the 2007 British Formula 3 series for Fortec Motorsport, ultimately finishing 17th after 18 races, with two points. The next year in 2008, Mansell entered the Formula Atlantic series, driving for Walker Racing. He competed in 11 races and was able to obtain 68 points, finishing the championship in 19th.

Mansell, with his father Nigel, tested a Chamberlain-Synergy team Le Mans prototype Lola-AER B06/10 during the week commencing 14 July 2008 at the Estoril circuit. He raced for the Ferrari GT2 team Team Modena in the Le Mans Series for the 2009 season. In the same year, he drove in the 2009 24 Hours of Le Mans, in the LMGT2 class. He finished seventh overall.

For the 2010 season, he co-drove a Ginetta-Zytek GZ09S – with his brother Greg and father Nigel – in select Le Mans Series events and in the 24 Hours of Le Mans. At the 8 Hours of Castellet they finished 9th overall (8th in LMP1), but their Le Mans effort was cut short due to a tyre failure and a crash by Nigel early in the event.

In 2011, Mansell signed with Lotus Italia to drive in the Blancpain Endurance Series GT4 Cup, in which, in five races, he would get 105 points overall and finish 2nd in the championship, his best result of his career. He won two races, got three podiums and one pole position.

== Racing record ==
=== Racing career summary ===
Season	Series	Team	Races	Wins	Poles	F/Laps	Podiums	Points	Position
2006	Formula BMW UK	Team SWR, Mansell Motorsport	20	0	0	0	0	0	25th
2006	British Formula 3	Fortec Motorsport	2	0	0	0	0	0	NC†
2007	British Formula 3	Fortec Motorsport	18	0	0	0	0	2	17th
2008	Formula Atlantic	Walker Racing	11	0	0	0	0	68	19th
2009	Le Mans Series - LMGT2	Team Modena	5	1	0	0	2	24	3rd
2009	24 Hours of Le Mans - LMGT2	Team Modena	1	0	0	0	0	0	7th
2010	Le Mans Series - LMP1	Beechdean Motorsport	3	1	0	0	1	34	9th
2010	24 Hours of Le Mans - LMP1	Beechdean Motorsport	1	0	0	0	0	0	DNF
2010	Intercontinental Le Mans Cup - LMP1	Beechdean Motorsport	1	0	0	0	0	0	NC†
2011	Blancpain Endurance Series - GT4 Cup	Lotus Italia	5	2	1	0	3	105	2nd

^{†} As Mansell was a guest driver, he was ineligible for points.

(key)

==== Atlantic Championship ====
Year	Team	1	2	3	4	5	6	7	8	9	10	11	Rank	Points
2008	Walker Racing	LBH; 19	LS; 11	MTT; Ret	EDM1; 17	EDM2; Ret	ROA1; 13	ROA2; Ret	TRR; 13	NJ; 12	UTA; 16	ATL; 11	19th	68

=== Complete 24 Hours of Le Mans results ===
Year	Team	Co-Drivers	Car	Class	Laps	Pos.	Class Pos.
2009	(United Kingdom) Team Modena	(Germany) Pierre Ehret (Russia) Roman Rusinov	Ferrari F430 GT2	GT2	314	27th	7th
2010	(United Kingdom) Beechdean Mansell	(United Kingdom) Nigel Mansell (United Kingdom) Greg Mansell	Ginetta-Zytek GZ09S	LMP1	4	DNF	DNF
