= Snoras =

Lithuanian bank

Bankas Snoras AB

- Snoras headquarters in Vilnius.
- Company type: Joint stock company (Nasdaq Baltic: SRS1L),(Nasdaq Baltic: SRS2L)
- Industry: Banking; Financial services
- Founded: 1992 in Šiauliai
- Defunct: November 24, 2011
- Fate: Bankruptcy
- Headquarters: Vilnius, Lithuania
- Area served: Lithuania, Latvia, Estonia
- Key people: Vladimir Antonov (Main shareholder, Chairman of Supervisory board); Raimundas Baranauskas (Shareholder, Chairman of Board)
- Products: Finance and insurance Consumer banking Corporate banking Mortgages; Credit cards
- Revenue: €394 million (2012)

Bankas Snoras AB or simply SNORAS (Nasdaq Baltic: SRS1L, Nasdaq Baltic: SRS2L) was a commercial bank, founded in Lithuania operating in all three Baltic states. It was a member of the financial group Konversbank and was listed on the NASDAQ OMX Vilnius stock exchange. On November 16, 2011, 100% of the bank shares were nationalized by the Lithuanian government and the bank was placed into temporary administration. On November 24, the bank was declared bankrupt. It had 4 billion litas (€1.16 billion) in debt.

== History ==
Bankas Snoras AB was founded 1992 as a regional bank of Šiauliai and renamed to its current name in 1993. It was recognised as the best bank in Lithuania in 2006 by financial publisher The Banker. However, an inspection at the bank in November 2011, revealed poor asset quality, weak risk management and lack of proper operating data. The check also revealed that the bank has ignored the central bank's recommendation to reduce operating risks.

== Shareholders ==
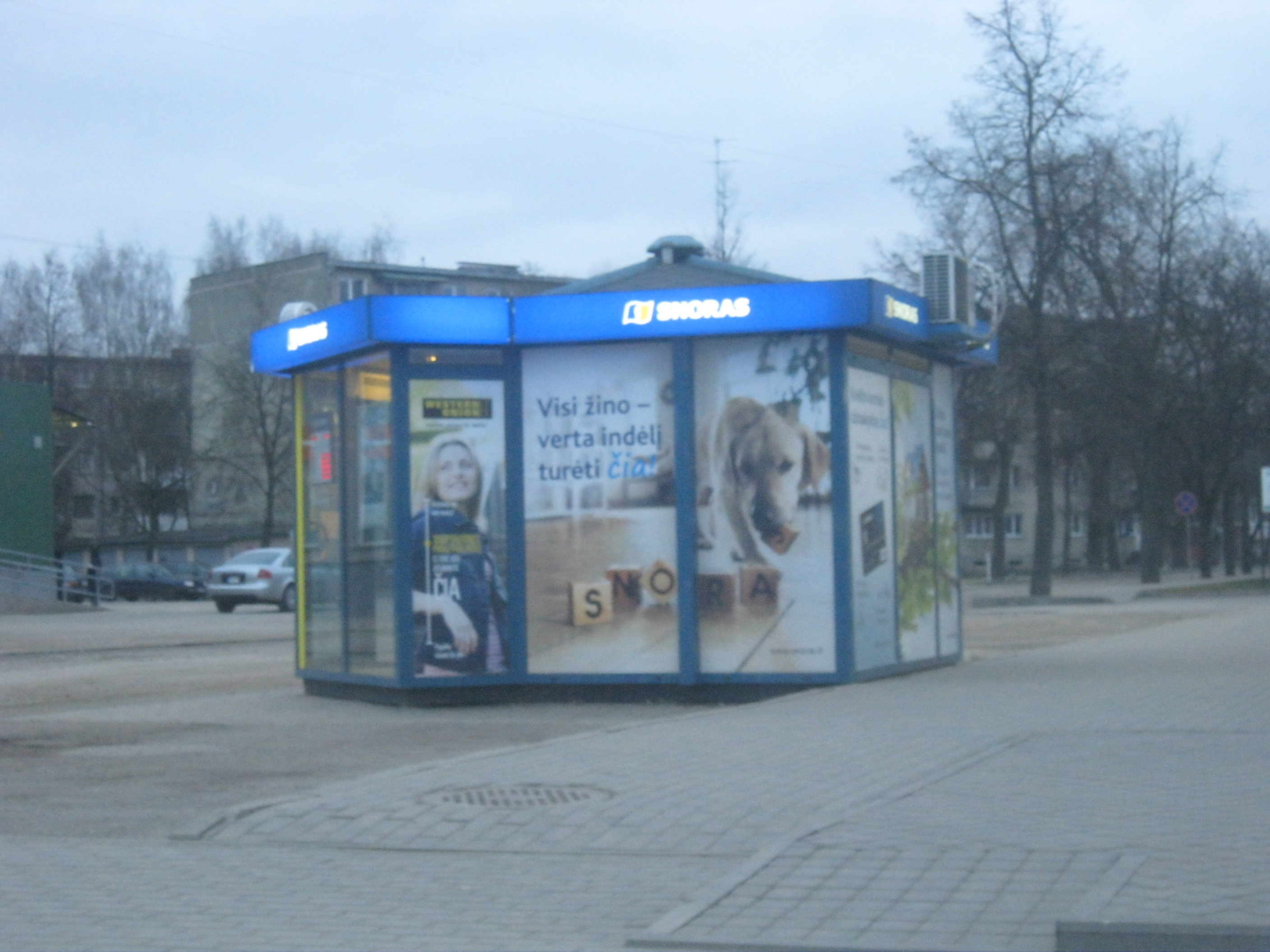
Snoras kiosk in Jonava.

Snoras was listed on the NASDAQ OMX Vilnius stock exchange. Major shareholders, holding more than 5% of the shares of the company were:

- Vladimir Antonov – 67%
- Raimondas Baranauskas – 25%

== Notable subsidiaries ==
Snoras has invested in a variety of business, most notable are:

- Investment bank Finasta
- Latvian bank Latvijas Krājbanka

== Bankruptcy ==
In 2011, November 16, by the decision of the Government of the Republic of Lithuania, the bank's activities were suspended, its managers were dismissed due to the possible default of the bank's credit obligations, and due to suspicions of non-transparent financial activities of the bank's managers. All the bank's shares were taken over by the state, the Bank of Lithuania temporarily appointed administrator Simon Freakley to coordinate the bank's activities.

In 2011, November 24, the Bank of Lithuania applied to the court regarding the bankruptcy of AB bankas Snoras, on December 7. Bankruptcy proceedings have been filed against the bank. Neil Hunter Cooper took over as receiver.

In 2014, Snoro's bankruptcy administrator will complete the sale of Finasto. The loan portfolio, the bank's and real estate assets taken over from borrowers, both in Lithuania and abroad, are being sold. February 1, employment contracts with 134 bank employees were extended, another 4 employees were on paternity or pregnancy leave.

== Investment in car industry ==
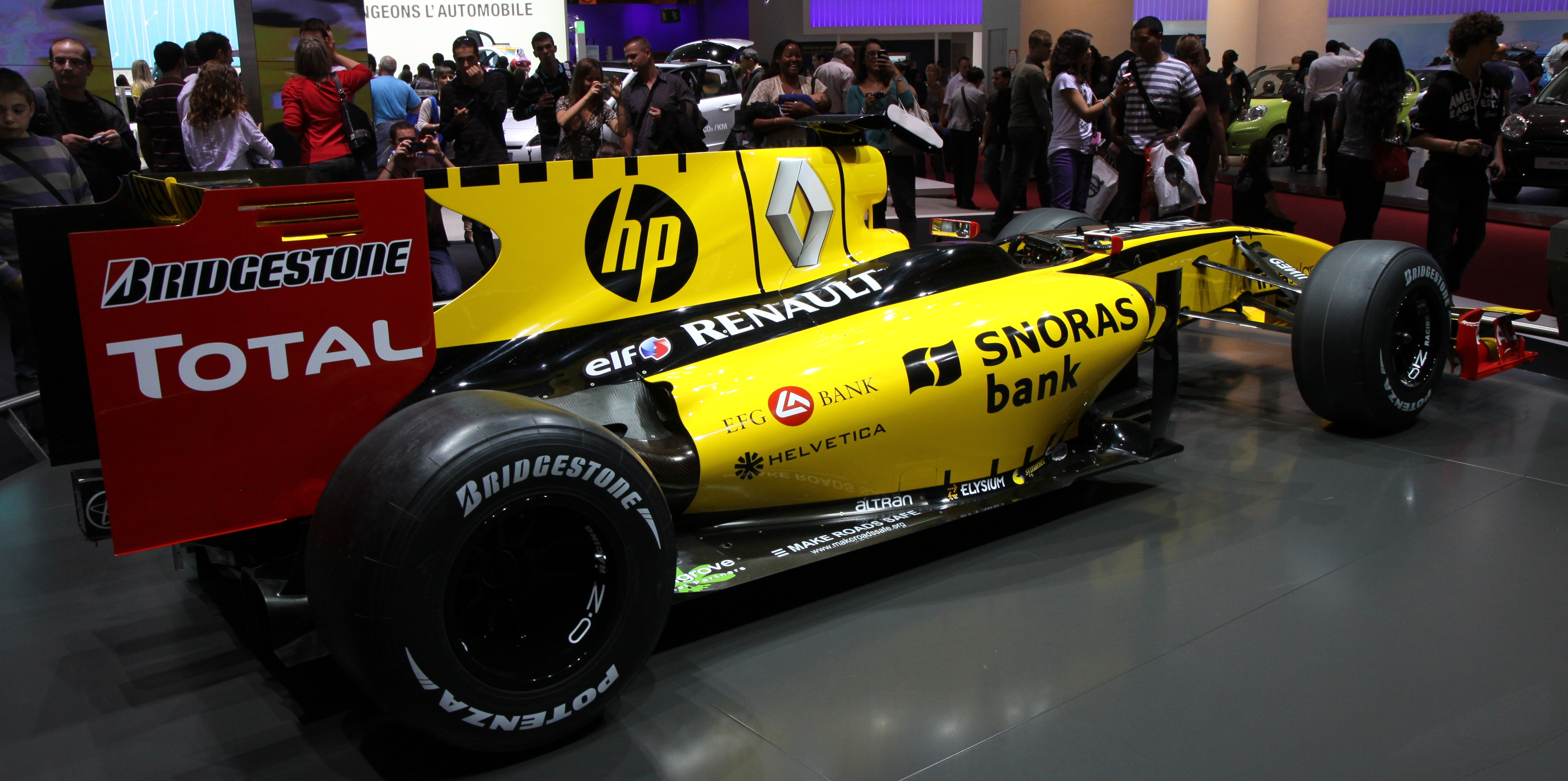
Snoras logo on Renault F1

Snoras, in 2008, purchased 29.8% of shares of Dutch sports car manufacturer Spyker Cars. In the same year, Snoras sold the stake in Spyker Cars. In 2010, Snoras became sponsor of Renault F1 team.

== See also ==
- List of banks in Lithuania
