= 2014 FFSA GT Championship =

2014 FFSA GT

Seasons
- ← 2013 2015 →

The 2014 FFSA GT Championship season was the eighteenth season of the FFSA GT Championship, the grand tourer-style sports car racing founded by the French automobile club Fédération Française du Sport Automobile. The season started on 26 April at Le Mans and ended on 26 October at Le Castellet after seven double-header meetings.

The drivers' championship was won by IMSA Performance drivers Raymond Narac and Nicolas Armindo, finishing just two points of their nearest rivals, Henri Hassid and Mike Parisy. A further five points behind in third place were Saintéloc Racing's David Hallyday and Grégory Guilvert. Narac and Armindo won the most races during the season with three victories. Hassid, Parisy, Hallyday, Guilvert, Philippe Giauque, Morgan Moullin-Traffort, Jean-Claude Police, Soheil Ayari, all scored two wins during the season.

== Race calendar and results ==
All races were held in France and were part of the GT Tour weekends, while Spa round was held and supported FIA WTCC Race of Belgium.

Round		Circuit	Date	Pole position	Overall winner	Coupe de France winner
1	R1	(France) Bugatti Circuit, Le Mans	26 April	(France) No. 50 Sébastien Loeb Racing	(France) No. 51 Sébastien Loeb Racing	(France) No. 350 Team Duqueine
1	R1	(France) Bugatti Circuit, Le Mans	26 April	(France) Roland Bervillé	(France) Henry Hassid (France) Mike Parisy	(France) Gilles Duqueine (France) Philippe Colançon
1	R2	(France) Bugatti Circuit, Le Mans	27 April	(France) No. 51 Sébastien Loeb Racing	(France) No. 9 Team Duqueine	(France) No. 350 Team Duqueine
1	R2	(France) Bugatti Circuit, Le Mans	27 April	(France) Mike Parisy	(France) Jean-Claude Police (France) Soheil Ayari	(France) Gilles Duqueine (France) Philippe Colançon
2	R1	(France) Circuit de Lédenon	31 May	(France) No. 76 IMSA Performance Matmut	(France) No. 76 IMSA Performance Matmut	(France) No. 21 Classic & Modern Racing
2	R1	(France) Circuit de Lédenon	31 May	(France) Raymond Narac	(France) Raymond Narac (France) Nicolas Armindo	(Switzerland) Pierre Hirschi (France) Thomas Nicolle
2	R2	(France) Circuit de Lédenon	31 May	(France) No. 50 Sébastien Loeb Racing	(France) No. 50 Sébastien Loeb Racing	(France) No. 350 Team Duqueine
2	R2	(France) Circuit de Lédenon	31 May	(France) Anthony Beltoise	(France) Roland Bervillé (France) Anthony Beltoise	(France) Gilles Duqueine (France) Philippe Colançon
3	R1	(Belgium) Circuit de Spa-Francorchamps	21 June	(Belgium) No. 5 Belgian Audi Club Team WRT	(France) No. 1 Team Sofrev ASP	(France) No. 350 Team Duqueine
3	R1	(Belgium) Circuit de Spa-Francorchamps	21 June	(Belgium) Enzo Ide	(France) Morgan Moullin-Traffort (France) Philippe Giauque	(France) Gilles Duqueine (France) Philippe Colançon
3	R2	(Belgium) Circuit de Spa-Francorchamps	22 June	(France) No. 1 Team Sofrev ASP	(Belgium) No. 5 Belgian Audi Club Team WRT	(France) No. 21 Classic & Modern Racing
3	R2	(Belgium) Circuit de Spa-Francorchamps	22 June	(France) Morgan Moullin-Traffort	(Belgium) Enzo Ide (Germany) André Lotterer	(Switzerland) Pierre Hirschi (France) Thomas Nicolle
4	R1	(France) Circuit du Val de Vienne, Le Vigeant	5 July	(France) No. 76 IMSA Performance Matmut	(France) No. 1 Team Sofrev ASP	(France) No. 350 Team Duqueine
4	R1	(France) Circuit du Val de Vienne, Le Vigeant	5 July	(France) Raymond Narac	(France) Morgan Moullin-Traffort (France) Philippe Giauque	(France) Gilles Duqueine (France) Philippe Colançon
4	R2	(France) Circuit du Val de Vienne, Le Vigeant	6 July	(France) No. 76 IMSA Performance Matmut	(France) No. 42 Saintéloc Racing	(France) No. 350 Team Duqueine
4	R2	(France) Circuit du Val de Vienne, Le Vigeant	6 July	(France) Nicolas Armindo	(France) David Hallyday (France) Grégory Guilvert	(France) Gilles Duqueine (France) Philippe Colançon
5	R1	(France) Circuit de Nevers Magny-Cours	6 September	(France) No. 51 Sébastien Loeb Racing	(France) No. 20 Team Sofrev ASP	(France) No. 21 Classic & Modern Racing
5	R1	(France) Circuit de Nevers Magny-Cours	6 September	(France) Henry Hassid	(France) Ludovic Badey (France) Jean-Luc Beaubelique	(Switzerland) Pierre Hirschi (France) Thomas Nicolle
5	R2	(France) Circuit de Nevers Magny-Cours	7 September	(France) No. 42 Saintéloc Racing	(France) No. 9 Team Duqueine	(France) No. 350 Team Duqueine
5	R2	(France) Circuit de Nevers Magny-Cours	7 September	(France) Grégory Guilvert	(France) Jean-Claude Police (France) Soheil Ayari	(France) Gilles Duqueine (France) Philippe Colançon
6	R1	(France) Circuit Paul Armagnac, Nogaro	27 September	(France) No. 1 Team Sofrev ASP	(France) No. 42 Saintéloc Racing	(France) No. 350 Team Duqueine
6	R1	(France) Circuit Paul Armagnac, Nogaro	27 September	(France) Philippe Giauque	(France) David Hallyday (France) Grégory Guilvert	(France) Gilles Duqueine (France) Philippe Colançon
6	R2	(France) Circuit Paul Armagnac, Nogaro	28 September	(France) No. 51 Sébastien Loeb Racing	(France) No. 51 Sébastien Loeb Racing	(France) No. 21 Classic & Modern Racing
6	R2	(France) Circuit Paul Armagnac, Nogaro	28 September	(France) Mike Parisy	(France) Henry Hassid (France) Mike Parisy	(Switzerland) Pierre Hirschi (France) Thomas Nicolle
7	R1	(France) Circuit Paul Ricard, Le Castellet	25 October	(France) No. 1 Team Sofrev ASP	(France) No. 76 IMSA Performance Matmut	(France) No. 350 Team Duqueine
7	R1	(France) Circuit Paul Ricard, Le Castellet	25 October	(France) Philippe Giauque	(France) Raymond Narac (France) Nicolas Armindo	(France) Gilles Duqueine (France) Philippe Colançon
7	R2	(France) Circuit Paul Ricard, Le Castellet	26 October	(France) No. 50 Sébastien Loeb Racing	(France) No. 4 Sport Garage	(France) No. 888 Team Duqueine
7	R2	(France) Circuit Paul Ricard, Le Castellet	26 October	(France) Anthony Beltoise	(France) Gilles Vannelet (France) Enzo Guibbert	(France) Ange Barde (France) Olivier Grotz

== Standings ==
=== Drivers' championship ===
Pos	Driver	LMS (France)		LÉD (France)		SPA (Belgium)		VDV (France)		MAG (France)		NOG (France)		LEC (France)		Points
1	(France) Raymond Narac (France) Nicolas Armindo	3	7	1	4	2	1	8	7	2	3	Ret	5	1	5	177
2	(France) Henri Hassid (France) Mike Parisy	1	5	Ret	6	2	3	6	4	3	5	2	1	7	9	175
3	(France) David Hallyday (France) Grégory Guilvert	2	12	5	2	3	5	7	1	7	8	1	16	5	3	170
4	(France) Philippe Giauque (France) Morgan Moullin-Traffort	5	Ret	2	Ret	1	14	1	2	8	2	DSQ	7	3	22	140
5	(France) Eric Debard (France) Olivier Panis	9	Ret	3	7	6	4	4	3	9	4	4	DSQ	6	2	125
6	(France) Arno Santamato	4	Ret	4	3	8	Ret	3	5	6	7	DSQ	6	2	4	122
7	(France) Jean-Claude Police (France) Soheil Ayari	6	1	6	5	7	6	2	Ret	4	1	DSQ	8	DSQ	Ret	110
8	(France) Éric Cayrolle			4	3	8	Ret	3	5	6	7	DSQ	6	2	4	110
9	(France) Jean-Luc Beaubelique (France) Ludovic Badey	8	Ret	7	8	Ret	5	11	6	1	6	DSQ	2	4	7	103
10	(France) Roland Bervillé (France) Anthony Beltoise	11	Ret	8	1	Ret	10	5	Ret	5	9	3	3	8	Ret	91
11	(France) Gilles Vannelet	7	2	9	Ret	5	Ret	Ret	DNS	11	Ret	DSQ	4	15	1	73
12	(France) Vincent Abril	10	3	11	10	4	12					6	9	12	8	50
13	(France) Enzo Guibbert									11	Ret	DSQ	4	15	1	37
14	(France) Bruce Lorgeré-Roux	7	2	9	Ret	5	Ret	Ret	DNS							36
15	(France) Laurent Cazenave	12	Ret	Ret	Ret	Ret	13	10	8	10	10	5	Ret	DSQ	8	23
16	(France) Jérôme Demay			11	10	4	12	12	Ret							17
17	(France) Nicolas Metairie	6	9	10	9									12	7	17
18	(France) Matthieu Lecuyer	10	3													16
19	(France) Pascal Destembert	Ret	4	10	9			12	Ret							15
19	(France) Rémy Deguffroy	Ret	4	10	9											15
20	(France) Grégoire Demoustier	DNS	DNS	Ret	Ret	Ret	9	9	9					9	17	14
21	(France) Claude Degremont											5	Ret	DSQ	8	14
22	(Belgium) Stéphane Lémeret	4	Ret													12
23	(France) Laurent Coubard	DNS	DNS	Ret	Ret	Ret	9	9	9							12
24	(France) Tony Samon	12	Ret	Ret	Ret	Ret	13	10	8	Ret	DNS			21	10	8
25	(France) Jean Glorieux									10	10					2
26	(France) Fabien Barthez													9	17	2
27	(Netherlands) Nick Catsburg									Ret	DNS			21	10	1
Guest drivers ineligible for points
	(Belgium) Enzo Ide (Germany) André Lotterer					12	1									0
	(Germany) Christian Ried (France) Matthieu Vaxivière													Ret	6	0
	(France) Michel Nourry (France) David Loger	13	7													0
	(Germany) Thomas Jäger (Austria) Mario Plachutta													10	13	0
	(France) Eric Clement (France) Olivier Pla													11	21	0
	(Switzerland) Cédric Leimer (France) Jonathan Cochet									12	15					0
	(France) Jean-Paul Buffin (Sweden) Edward Sandström													13	14	0
	(France) Benoît Tréluyer (Belgium) Yves Weerts					13	15									0
	(France) Renaud Derlot (France) Gérard Tonelli			Ret	13											0
	(France) Patrice Garrouste (France) Marc Guillot			DNS	DNS											0
Coupe de France
1	(France) Gilles Duqueine (France) Philippe Colançon	14	6	Ret	11	9	Ret	13	9	13	12	DSQ	9	14	16	416
2	(Switzerland) Pierre Hirschi (France) Thomas Nicolle	15	8	12	15	Ret	8	14	10	14	13	9	11	20	15	411
3	(France) Gilles Lallement	16	11	13	12	11	16	Ret	11	Ret	14	10	Ret	Ret	DNS	211
4	(France) Jean-Paul Buffin	17	9	Ret	14	Ret	11	Ret	11			10	Ret			106
5	(France) Fabrice Rossello	16	11	13	12											92
6	(France) Marc Sourd			Ret	14	Ret	11			Ret	14					70
7	(France) Jean-Claude Lagniez					11	16									70
8	(France) Jacques Wolf	17	9													36
Guest drivers ineligible for points
	(France) Ange Barde (France) Olivier Grotz													16	11	0
	(France) Cédric Mézard (France) Philippe Arrobio													17	18	0
	(France) Florent Petit (France) Julien Goujat													18	19	0
	(France) Franck Labescat (France) Christian Philippon													19	20	0
	(France) Pierre Sancinena													Ret	DNS	0
Pos	Driver	LMS (France)		LÉD (France)		SPA (Belgium)		VDV (France)		MAG (France)		NOG (France)		LEC (France)		Points

Colour	Result
Gold	Winner
Silver	Second place
Bronze	Third place
Green	Points classification
Blue	Non-points classification
Blue	Non-classified finish (NC)
Purple	Retired, not classified (Ret)
Red	Did not qualify (DNQ)
Red	Did not pre-qualify (DNPQ)
Black	Disqualified (DSQ)
White	Did not start (DNS)
White	Withdrew (WD)
White	Race cancelled (C)
Blank	Did not practice (DNP)
Blank	Did not arrive (DNA)
Blank	Excluded (EX)

**Bold** – Pole
Italics – Fastest Lap
