= Nicolas Armindo =

French racing driver

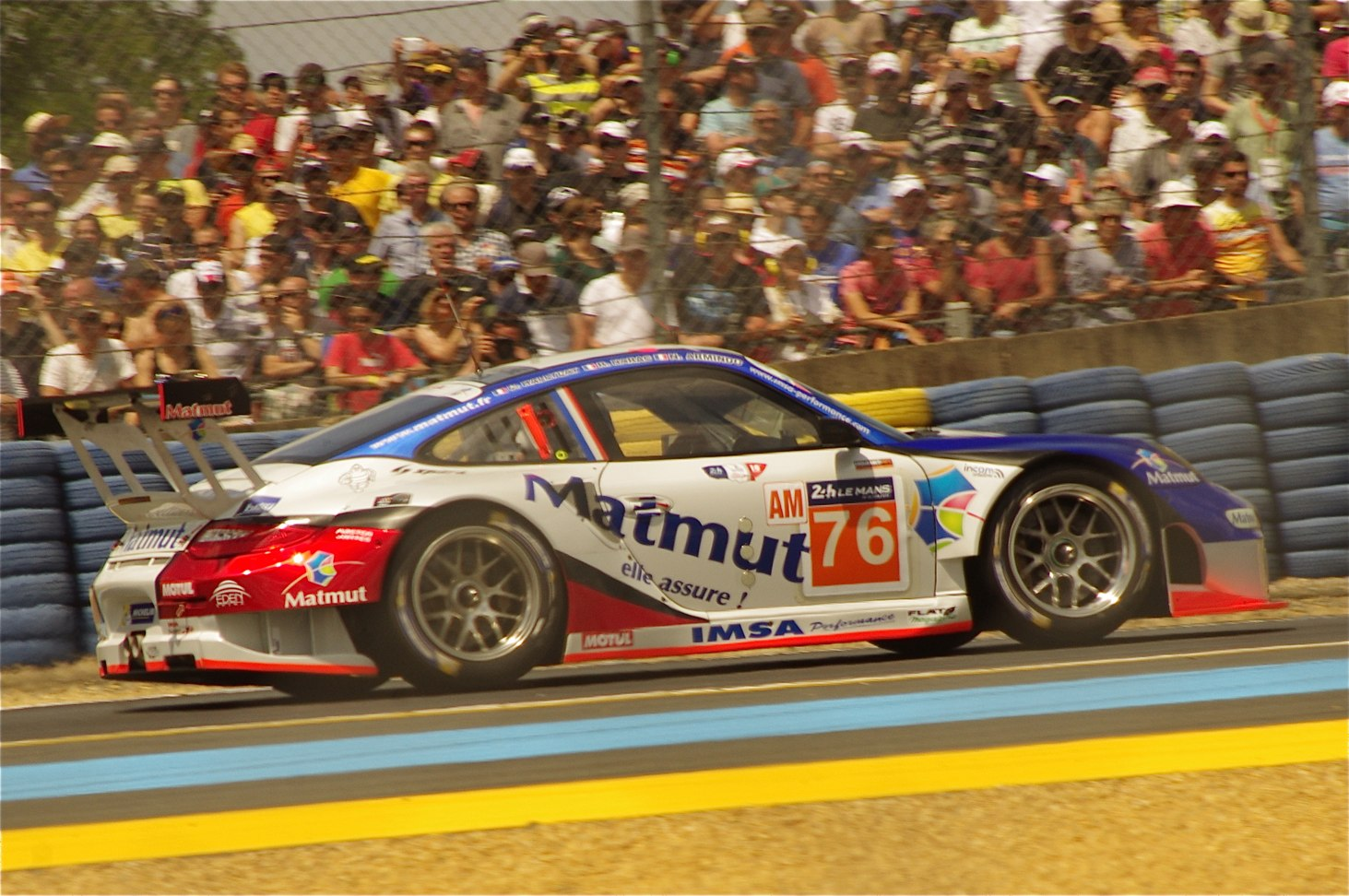
- Armindo in 2014
- Nationality: (France) French
- Born: 8 March 1982 (age 44) Colmar (France)

FIA GT1 World Championship career
- Debut season: 2010
- Current team: Matech Competition
- Categorisation: FIA Gold (until 2018); FIA Silver (2019–)
- Car number: 6
- Former teams: Mad-Croc Racing
- Starts: 8
- Wins: 0
- Poles: 0
- Fastest laps: 0
- Best finish: 33rd in 2010

Previous series
- 2009 2002-03 2002-03: FIA GT3; Formula Renault 2.0 Eurocup; FFSA Formula Renault 2.0

Championship titles
- 2014 2011–2012 2010: FFSA GT Championship; Le Mans Series – GTE Am; Porsche Carrera Cup Germany

24 Hours of Le Mans career
- Years: 2011, 2012, 2014
- Teams: IMSA Performance Matmut
- Best finish: 17th
- Class wins: 0

Nicolas Armindo (born 8 March 1982) is a French race car driver of Portuguese descent.

Having raced locally in karting, Armindo started his career in French Formula Campus in 2001, before moving on to Formula Renault and Porsche one-make competition. He amassed three wins in Porsche Supercup and eventually became Porsche Carrera Cup Germany champion in 2010 for Hermes Attempto Racing, beating Nick Tandy and Uwe Alzen.

Armindo had already made a one-off FIA GT debut at Istanbul in 2005, and later came third in the 2009 FIA GT3 European Championship and sixth in ADAC GT Masters with Audi regulars Team Rosberg.

In 2011, Armindo graduated to LM GTE and began a prolific relationship with IMSA Performance, as he and Raymond Narac dominated the European Le Mans Series back-to-back. They were joined by Porsche factory driver Patrick Pilet at the 2011 24 Hours of Le Mans and finished fifth in GTE Pro, before Armindo then led the team to a GTE Am–class podium at the 2012 edition and a win at Spa-Francorchamps.

After a year away in ADAC GT Masters in 2013, Armindo reunited with Narac to win the 2014 FFSA GT Championship, a programme he dovetailed with the Blancpain Endurance Series. He would spend the latter stages of his career in the SRO flagship series, ranging from BMW to McLaren, Lamborghini and Porsche machinery. In 2017 and 2018, he won the 500 Nocturnes night race at Anneau du Rhin for AB Sport Auto.

Armindo now works as a property developer in his home city of Colmar.

== Racing record ==
=== Complete Porsche Supercup results ===
(key) (Races in bold indicate pole position – 2 points awarded 2008 onwards in all races) (Races in italics indicate fastest lap)

Year	Team	Car	1	2	3	4	5	6	7	8	9	10	11	12	Pos.	Pts
2006	Lechner Racing School Team	Porsche 997 GT3	BHR; 19	ITA	GER	ESP	MON	GBR	USA	USA	FRA	GER	HUN	ITA	NC	0‡
2007	Tolimit Motorsport	Porsche 997 GT3	BHR; Ret	BHR; 8	ESP; 8	MON; 7	FRA; 2	**GBR**; 1	GER; 11	HUN; Ret	TUR; Ret	ITA; 19	BEL; Ret		9th	72
2008	Tolimit Motorsport	Porsche 997 GT3	BHR; 18	BHR; 6	ESP; 4	TUR; Ret	MON; 18	**FRA**; 9	GBR; 15	GER; 6	HUN; 16	ESP	BEL	ITA; 1	11th	73
2010	Al Faisal Lechner Racing	Porsche 997 GT3	BHR	BHR	ESP	MON	ESP	GBR	**GER**; 1	HUN	BEL; 5	ITA; 7			NC	0‡
2015	Konrad Motorsport	Porsche 991 GT3	ESP	MON	AUT; 17	GBR	HUN	BEL	BEL	ITA	ITA	USA	USA		NC	0‡

† — Did not finish the race, but was classified as he completed over 90% of the race distance.

‡ — Guest driver – Not eligible for points.

=== Complete GT1 World Championship results ===
Year	Team	Car	1	2	3	4	5	6	7	8	9	10	11	12	13	14	15	16	17	18	19	20	Pos	Points
2010	Mad-Croc Racing	Corvette	ABU; QR	ABU; CR	SIL; QR; 12	SIL; CR; 11	BRN; QR	BRN; CR	PRI; QR	PRI; CR													33rd	14
2010	Matech Competition	Ford									SPA; QR	SPA; CR	NÜR; QR	NÜR; CR	ALG; QR	ALG; CR	NAV; QR; 4	NAV; CR; 7	INT; QR; 7	INT; CR; 8	SAN; QR; 17	SAN; CR; 8	33rd	14

=== Complete European Le Mans Series results ===
(key) (Races in bold indicate pole position; results in italics indicate fastest lap)

Year	Entrant	Class	Chassis	Engine	1	2	3	4	5	Rank	Points
2011	IMSA Performance Matmut	LMGTE Am	Porsche 997 GT3-RSR	Porsche M97/74 4.0 L Flat-6	**LEC**; 6	**SPA**; 1	IMO; 1	**SIL**; 1	**EST**; 1	1st	75
2012	IMSA Performance Matmut	LMGTE Am	Porsche 997 GT3-RSR	Porsche M97/74 4.0 L Flat-6	LEC; 2	DON; 1	**PET**; 1			1st	94
2014	IMSA Performance Matmut	LMGTE	Porsche 997 GT3-RSR	Porsche M97/74 4.0 L Flat-6	SIL; 3	IMO; 6	RBR; Ret	LEC; 8	EST; 9	10th	29

=== 24 Hours of Le Mans results ===
Year	Team	Co-Drivers	Car	Class	Laps	Pos.	Class Pos.
2011	(France) IMSA Performance Matmut	(France) Raymond Narac (France) Patrick Pilet	Porsche 997 GT3-RSR	GTE; Pro	311	17th	5th
2012	(France) IMSA Performance Matmut	(France) Anthony Pons (France) Raymond Narac	Porsche 997 GT3-RSR	GTE; Am	328	21st	**2nd**
2014	(France) IMSA Performance Matmut	(France) Raymond Narac (France) David Hallyday	Porsche 997 GT3-RSR	GTE; Am	323	31st	11th

Sporting positions
Preceded by Thomas Jäger	Porsche Carrera Cup Germany champion 2010	Succeeded by Nick Tandy
Preceded by Morgan Moulin-Traffort; Fabien Barthez	FFSA GT Champion; 2014 with: (Raymond Narac)	Succeeded by Sébastien Dumez; Raymond Narac; Olivier Pernaut
