= Raymond Narac =

French racing driver (born 1967)

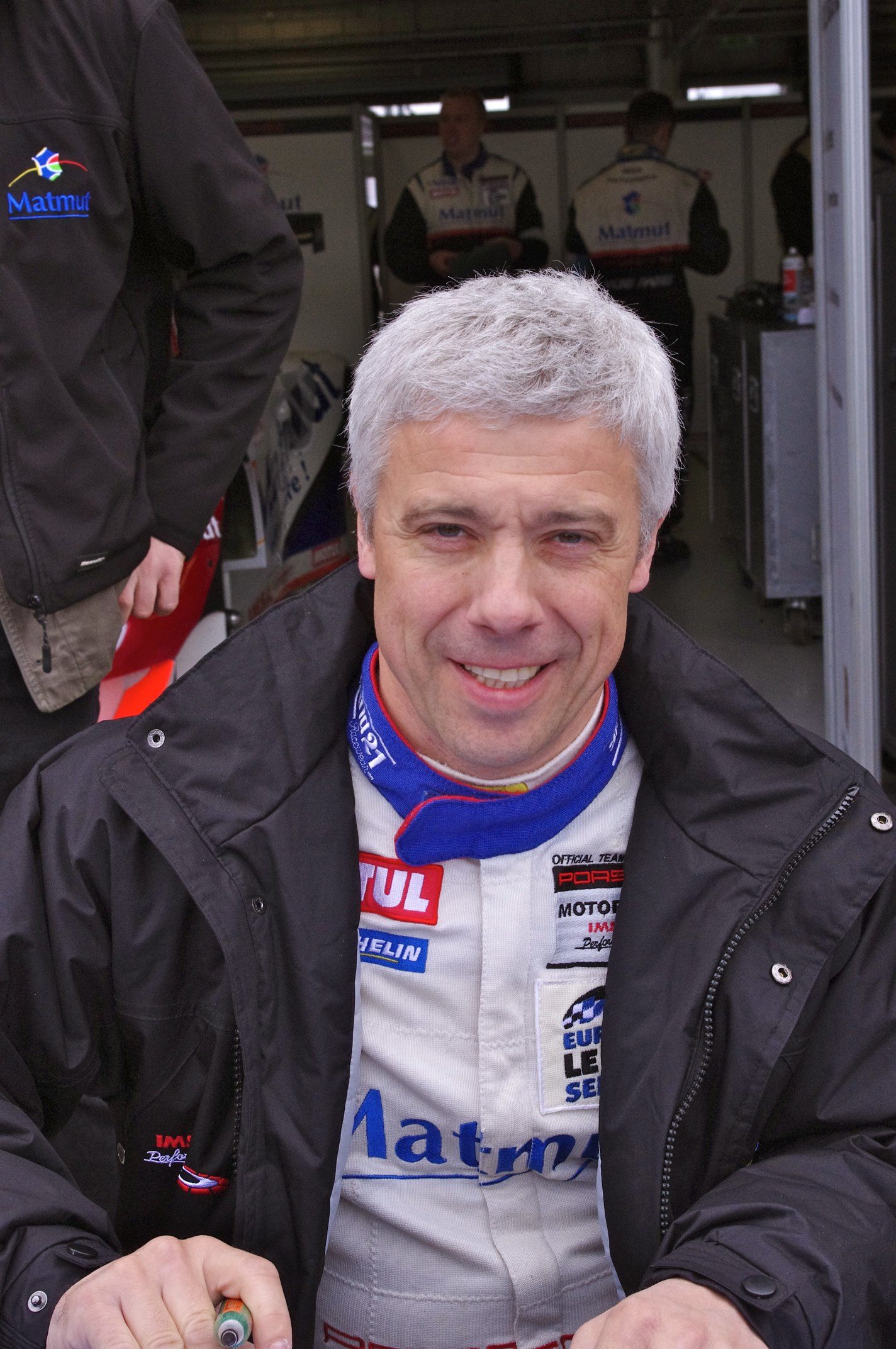
- Narac in 2014
- Nationality: (France) French
- Born: 3 March 1967 (age 59) Caudebec-en-Caux, France
- Relatives: Raphaël Narac (son)
- Categorisation: FIA Silver (until 2017); FIA Bronze (2018–)

Championship titles
- 2020 2018, 2020 2014-2015 2011-2012 2007 2005-2006, 2008 2005: Sixties Endurance Serie; Group C Racing – GT1; FFSA GT Championship; European Le Mans Series – LMGTE Am; French GT Championship – GT1; French GT Championship – GT2; Porsche Carrera Cup France – B

Raymond Laurent Vincent Narac (born 3 March 1967) is a French racing driver who last competed for Les Deux Arbres in the JS P4 class of the Ligier European Series. He is best known for founding IMSA Performance, where he racked up consecutive ELMS titles and a pair of 24 Hours of Le Mans class wins.

== Career ==
Narac founded IMSA Performance in 2001 along with Patrick Rava, and began his racing career three years later, racing in the FFSA GT Championship for the team, finishing third in the GT Cup standings with a win at Magny-Cours. The following year, Narac remained in the series as he switched to the GT2 class, in which he took ten wins and secured the class title. During 2005, Narac also raced in the 24 Hours of Le Mans in the GT2 class, and won the Porsche Carrera Cup France – B title.

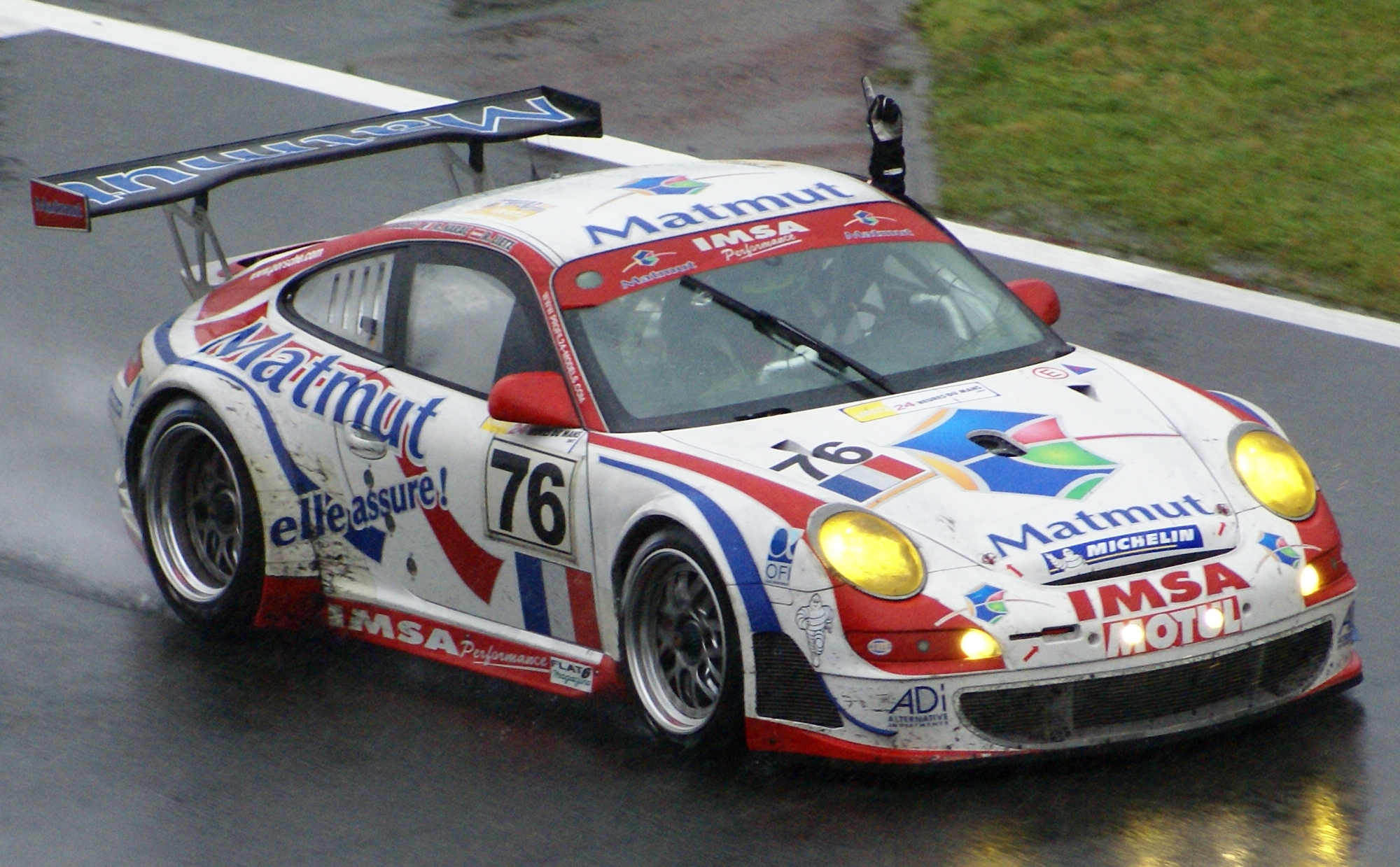
Narac celebrating his maiden 24 Hours of Le Mans class victory in 2007.

Another title win in GT2 ensued the following year, during which he also made his debut in the Le Mans Series, as well as returning to the 24 Hours of Le Mans with his Porsche 911 GT3. Joining Oreca to step up to GT1 competition in the French GT Championship, Narac scored six wins and four other podiums to secure his first overall title in the series. During 2007, Narac continued to race in GT2 machinery, competing for IMSA Performance in the Le Mans Series and the 24 Hours of Le Mans, the latter of which he won in class.

In 2008, Narac primarily raced in the Le Mans Series, taking two class podiums to take seventh in the GT2 standings. During 2008, Narac also raced in the last four rounds of the French GT Championship, winning all eight races as he secured his third GT2 title in four seasons. The following year, Narac remained with his team to race in both the Le Mans Series and International GT Open. In the former, Narac scored podiums at Algarve and Silverstone to finish sixth in GT2, whereas in the latter, he took six wins and four other podiums to finish third in the Super GT standings.

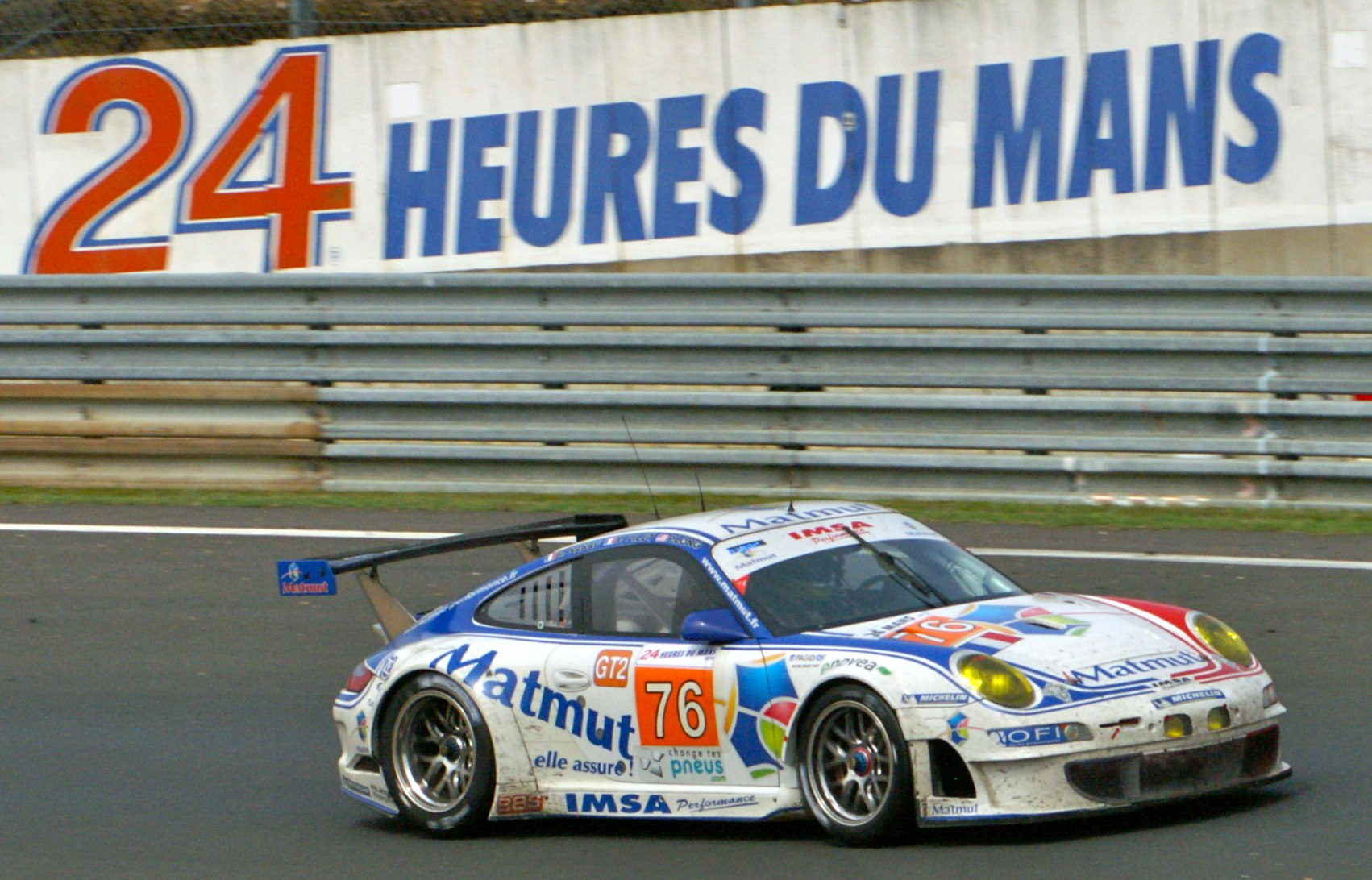
Narac driving for his IMSA Performance team at the 2010 24 Hours of Le Mans.

At the start of 2010, Narac won the Dubai 24 Hour, before racing in both the Le Mans Series and International GT Open for the rest of the year. Scoring a lone podium at the Hungaroring and finishing fifth in GT2 in the former, Narac then took four wins in the latter to end the year fourth in the Super GT standings. During 2010, Narac also finished second overall at the 24 Hours of Spa. Continuing in the Le Mans Series for 2011, Narac began the year by finishing sixth at Le Castellet, before winning the next four races to seal the LMGTE Am title.

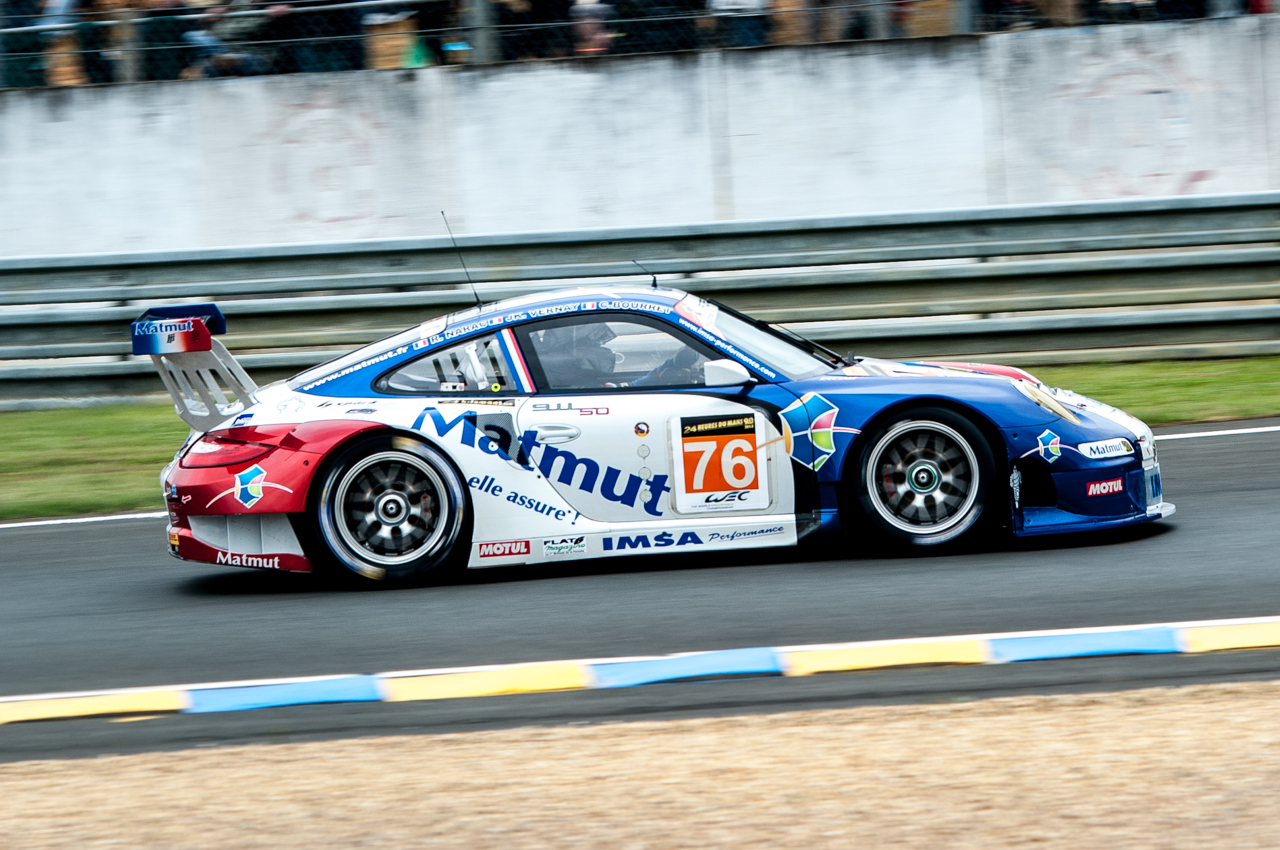
Narac sealed his second Le Mans win at the start of the FIA WEC era in 2013.

Remaining in the newly-rebranded European Le Mans Series for 2012, Narac won at Donington Park and Road Atlanta to secure his second consecutive LMGTE Am title. In parallel, Narac raced in International GT Open, taking a lone win at Monza and five other podiums to finish sixth in the Super GT standings. During 2012, Narac also raced at the 24 Hours of Le Mans, finishing second in LMGTE Am. The following year, Narac moved to the FIA World Endurance Championship, taking a class win at the 24 Hours of Le Mans and two other podiums to end the year third in LMGTE Am.

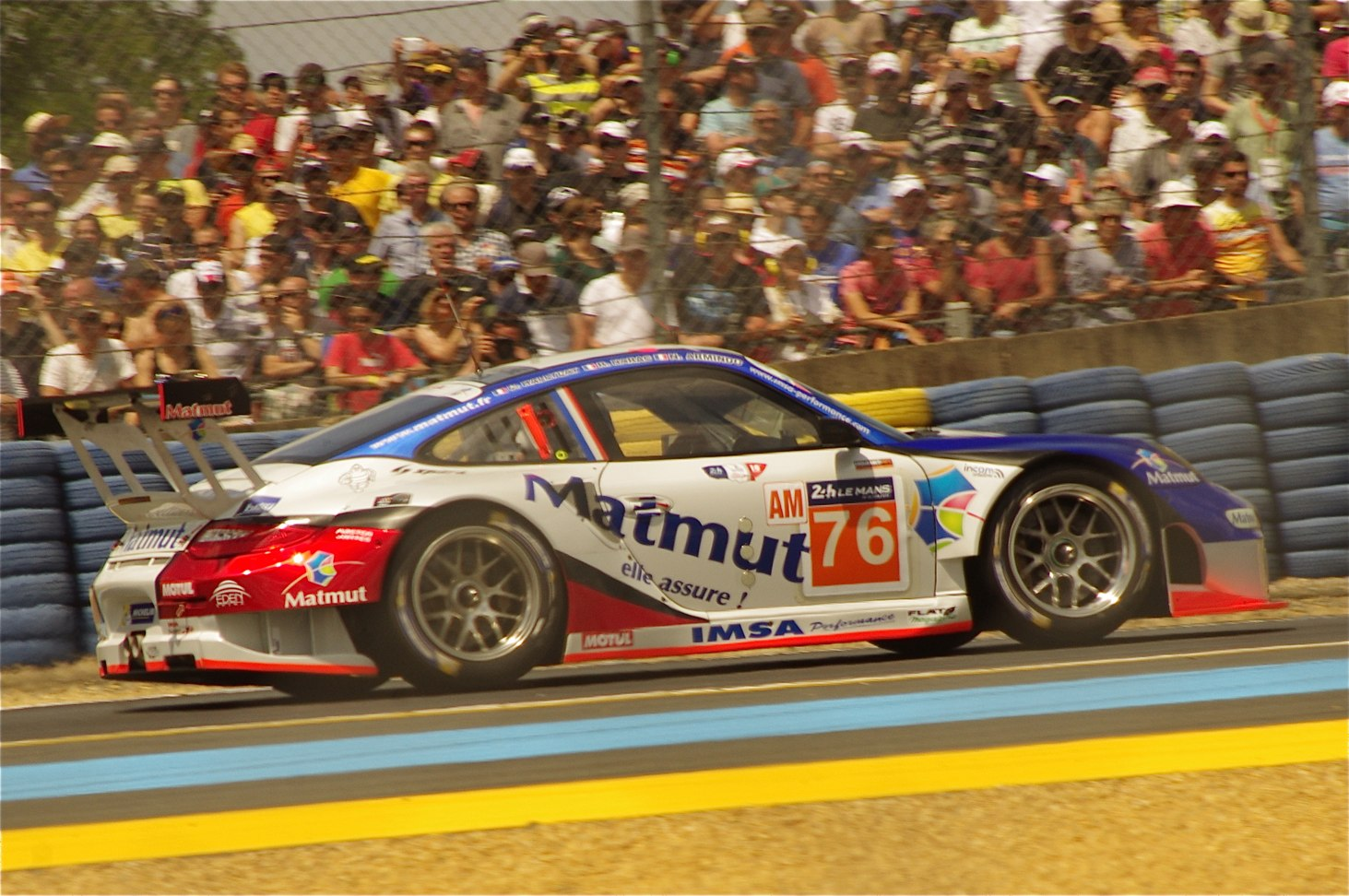
Narac's Matmut-liveried Porsche at the 2014 24 Hours of Le Mans.

Returning to the European Le Mans Series for 2014, Narac scored a lone podium at Silverstone as he finished the season 10th in LMGTE. In parallel, Narac returned to the FFSA GT Championship, taking three wins and three other podiums to clinch his second overall title in the series. Returning only to the latter for 2015, Narac won at Spa and Magny-Cours and took five more podiums to seal his second consecutive and third total FFSA GT title. Narac then switched to the Blancpain GT Series Endurance Cup the following year, taking a class win at the 24 Hours of Spa, helping him end the year 11th in the Pro-Am standings.

Following that, Narac raced in the 2017 Road to Le Mans, before competing in the first two rounds of the 2018 European Le Mans Series for fellow Porsche customer EbiMotors in LMGTE, finishing third in both races. Narac then spent the following two years mainly competing in classic races, before racing in Porsche Carrera Cup France in 2021 and making a one-off appearance in the JS P4 class of the Ligier European Series the following year for Les Deux Arbres.

== Personal life ==
Narac's son, Raphaël, is also a racing driver who made two LMP2 starts in 2024.

== Racing record ==
=== Racing career summary ===
Season	Series	Team	Races	Wins	Poles	F/Laps	Podiums	Points	Position
2004	French GT Championship – GT Cup	IMSA Performance	14	1	0	0	6	237	**3rd**
2004	Porsche Carrera Cup France	IMSA Performance	6	0	0	0	0	0	NC
2005	French GT Championship – GT2	IMSA Performance	15	10	0	0	11	144	**1st**
2005	Porsche Carrera Cup France – B	IMSA Performance	14						**1st**
2005	24 Hours of Le Mans – GT2	IMSA Performance	1	0	0	0	0	—N/a	4th
2005	FIA GT Championship – GT1	Larbre Compétition	1	0	0	0	0	1	41st
2006	Le Mans Series – GT2	IMSA Performance Matmut	5	0	0	0	0	18	5th
2006	French GT Championship – GT2	IMSA Performance Matmut	14	11	0	0	13	128	**1st**
2006	Porsche Carrera Cup France	IMSA Performance Matmut	13	0	0	0	0	25	10th
2006	24 Hours of Le Mans – GT2	IMSA Performance Matmut	1	0	0	0	0	—N/a	DNF
2006	FIA GT3 European Championship	Larbre Compétition	2	0	0	0	0	0	NC
2007	French GT Championship – GT1	Oreca	14	6	6	2	10	300	**1st**
2007	Le Mans Series – GT2	IMSA Performance Matmut	5	0	2	0	1	11	10th
2007	24 Hours of Le Mans – GT2	IMSA Performance Matmut	1	1	0	0	1	—N/a	**1st**
2007	FIA GT Championship – GT2	IMSA Performance Matmut	1	0	0	0	1	13.5	17th
2008	Le Mans Series – GT2	IMSA Performance Matmut	5	0	0	0	2	15	7th
2008	French GT Championship – GT2	IMSA Performance Matmut	8	8	5	5	8	78	**1st**
2008	24 Hours of Le Mans – GT2	IMSA Performance Matmut	1	0	0	0	0	—N/a	DNF
2008	FIA GT Championship – GT2	IMSA Performance Matmut	1	0	0	0	0	4.5	28th
2009	Le Mans Series – GT2	IMSA Performance Matmut	5	0	0	0	2	19	6th
2009	International GT Open – Super GT	IMSA Performance Matmut	16	6	0	2	10	91	**3rd**
2009	V de V Challenge Endurance Moderne – GT	IMSA Performance Matmut	3	1	1	1	2	110	8th
2009	24 Hours of Le Mans – GT2	IMSA Performance Matmut	1	0	0	0	0	—N/a	DNF
2009	FIA GT Championship – GT2	IMSA Performance Matmut	1	0	0	0	0	0	NC
2009	Formula Le Mans Cup	Applewood-LD Autosport	3	0	0	0	0	4	39th
2010	Dubai 24 Hour	IMSA Performance Matmut	1	1	0	0	1	—N/a	**1st**
2010	Le Mans Series – GT2	IMSA Performance Matmut	5	0	0	0	1	47	5th
2010	International GT Open – Super GT	IMSA Performance Matmut	16	4	0	1	8	181	4th
2010	24 Hours of Le Mans – LMGT2	IMSA Performance Matmut	1	0	0	0	0	—N/a	5th
2010	24 Hours of Spa – GT2	IMSA Performance Matmut	1	0	0	0	1	—N/a	**2nd**
2010	FIA GT3 European Championship	Mühlner Motorsport	2	0	0	0	0	16	25th
2011	Le Mans Series – LMGTE Am	IMSA Performance Matmut	5	4	4	0	4	75	**1st**
2011	V de V Challenge Endurance Moderne – GT	IMSA Performance Matmut	6	3	0	0	4	205.5	4th
2011	Intercontinental Le Mans Cup – LMGTE Am	IMSA Performance Matmut	3	3	0	0	3	0	NC
2011	24 Hours of Le Mans – LMGTE Pro	IMSA Performance Matmut	1	0	0	0	0	—N/a	5th
2012	European Le Mans Series – LMGTE Am	IMSA Performance Matmut	3	2	1	0	3	94	**1st**
2012	International GT Open – Super GT	IMSA Performance Matmut	15	1	0	0	6	63	6th
2012	V de V Challenge Endurance Moderne – Scratch	IMSA Performance Matmut	5	3	0	0	5	157.5	**3rd**
2012	24 Hours of Le Mans – LMGTE Am	IMSA Performance Matmut	1	0	0	0	1	—N/a	**2nd**
2013	FIA World Endurance Championship – LMGTE Am	IMSA Performance Matmut	8	1	0	0	3	122	**3rd**
2013	24 Hours of Le Mans – LMGTE Am	IMSA Performance Matmut	1	1	0	0	1	—N/a	**1st**
2014	European Le Mans Series – LMGTE	IMSA Performance Matmut	5	0	0	0	1	29	10th
2014	FFSA GT Championship	IMSA Performance Matmut	14	3	3	0	6	177	**1st**
2014	24 Hours of Le Mans – LMGTE Am	IMSA Performance Matmut	1	0	0	0	0	—N/a	11th
2015	FFSA GT Championship	IMSA Performance Matmut	14	2	0	0	7	166	**1st**
2015	Challenge Endurance GT/Tourisme V de V	IMSA Performance Matmut	1	0	0	0	0	0	NC
2015	Classic Endurance Racing – GT1		2	2	0	0	2	0	NC
2016	Blancpain GT Series Endurance Cup – Pro-Am	IMSA Performance	5	1	0	0	1	35	11th
2016	Intercontinental GT Challenge – Am	IMSA Performance	1	0	0	0	0	0	NC
2016	Challenge Endurance GT Tourisme V de V	IMSA Performance	5	1	0	2	2	175.5	4th
2016	Le Mans Classic – Plateau 4		3	0	0	0	0		6th
2016	Le Mans Classic – Plateau 6		3	0	0	0	0		17th
2016	Classic Endurance Racing – GT1		2	0	0	0	0	64	13th
2017	24H Series – A6	IMSA Performance	1	0	0	0	0	0	NC
2017	Le Mans Cup – GT3	IMSA Performance	2	0	0	0	0	3	16th
2017	Challenge Endurance GT Tourisme V de V – GTV1	IMSA Performance	1	1	0	0	1	45	12th
2017	Classic Endurance Racing – GT1		5	3	0	0	3	145	**3rd**
2017	Group C Racing – GT1		12	1	0	1	8	238	**3rd**
2018	European Le Mans Series – LMGTE	EbiMotors	2	0	0	0	2	31	9th
2018	Group C Racing – GT1		9	4	0	0	7	235	**1st**
2018	Classic Endurance Racing – GT1		5	2	1	0	3	134	**3rd**
2018	Le Mans Classic – Porsche Classic		1	0	0	0	0	—N/a	**2nd**
2019	Classic Endurance Racing – GT1		5	1	5	4	3	139.5	6th
2019	Endurance Racing Legends Proto A		6	5	0	3	5	22.5	**2nd**
2019	Group C Racing – C1		5	1	0	1	3	86	8th
2019	Group C Racing – Class 3		2	0	0	0	1	16	11th
2020	Group C Racing – C1		6	4	0	2	6	90	**1st**
2020	Sixties Endurance Series		3	1	0	0	2	86	**1st**
2020	Endurance Racing Legends Proto A		2	1	1	1	2	7.5	5th
2021	Porsche Carrera Cup France – Pro-Am	IMSA Performance	12	2	0	0	5	171	4th
2022	Ligier European Series – JS P4	Les Deux Arbres	2	0	0	0	0	13	16th
2022	Le Mans Classic – Plateau 4		3	0	0	0	2		4th
2025	Le Mans Classic – Endurance Racing Legends LMP		1	0	0	0	0	0	NC

=== Complete 24 Hours of Le Mans results ===
Year	Team	Co-Drivers	Car	Class	Laps	Pos.	Class Pos.
2005	(France) IMSA Performance	(France) Romain Dumas (France) Sébastien Dumez	Porsche 911 GT3-RS	GT2	322	15th	4th
2006	(France) IMSA Performance Matmut	(France) Romain Dumas (Italy) Luca Riccitelli	Porsche 911 GT3-RSR	GT2	211	DNF	DNF
2007	(France) IMSA Performance Matmut	(Austria) Richard Lietz (United States) Patrick Long	Porsche 997 GT3-RSR	GT2	320	15th	**1st**
2008	(France) IMSA Performance Matmut	(Austria) Richard Lietz (United States) Patrick Long	Porsche 997 GT3-RSR	GT2	26	DNF	DNF
2009	(France) IMSA Performance Matmut	(France) Patrick Pilet (United States) Patrick Long	Porsche 997 GT3-RSR	GT2	265	DNF	DNF
2010	(France) IMSA Performance Matmut	(France) Patrick Pilet (United States) Patrick Long	Porsche 997 GT3-RSR	GT2	321	17th	5th
2011	(France) IMSA Performance Matmut	(France) Patrick Pilet (France) Nicolas Armindo	Porsche 997 GT3-RSR	LMGTE Pro	311	17th	5th
2012	(France) IMSA Performance Matmut	(France) Anthony Pons (France) Nicolas Armindo	Porsche 997 GT3-RSR	LMGTE Am	328	21st	**2nd**
2013	(France) IMSA Performance Matmut	(France) Jean-Karl Vernay (France) Christophe Bourret	Porsche 911 GT3 RSR	LMGTE Am	306	25th	**1st**
2014	(France) IMSA Performance Matmut	(France) Nicolas Armindo (France) David Hallyday	Porsche 997 GT3-RSR	LMGTE Am	323	31st	11th

=== Complete FIA GT Championship results ===
(key) (Races in bold indicate pole position) (Races in italics indicate fastest lap)

Year	Team	Car	Class	1	2	3	4	5	6	7	8	9	10	11	12	13	Pos.	Pts
2005	Larbre Compétition	Ferrari 550-GTS Maranello	GT1	MNZ	MAG	SIL	IMO	BRN	SPA; 6H	SPA; 12H	SPA; 24H	OSC	IST	ZHU	DUB	BHR; 8	41st	1
2007	IMSA Performance Matmut	Porsche 911 GT3 RSR	GT2	ZHU	SIL	BUC	MNZ	OSC	SPA; 6H; 4	SPA; 12H; 3	SPA; 24H; 2	ADR	BRN	NOG	ZOL		17th	13.5
2008	IMSA Performance Matmut	Porsche 911 GT3 RSR	GT2	SIL	MNZ	ADR	OSC	SPA; 6H; 4	SPA; 12H; 11	SPA; 24H; 7	BUC; 1	BUC; 2	BRN	NOG	ZOL	SAN	28th	4.5
2009	IMSA Performance Matmut	Porsche 911 GT3 RSR	GT2	SIL	ADR	OSC	SPA; 6H; DSQ	SPA; 12H; DSQ	SPA; 24H; DSQ	BUC	ALG	LEC	ZOL				NC	0

=== Complete European Le Mans Series results ===
(key) (Races in bold indicate pole position; results in italics indicate fastest lap)

Year	Entrant	Class	Chassis	Engine	1	2	3	4	5	6	Rank	Points
2006	IMSA Performance Matmut	GT2	Porsche 997 GT3-RSR	Porsche 3.6L Flat-6	IST; 4	SPA; 5	NUR; 6	DON; 5	JAR; 7		5th	18
2007	IMSA Performance Matmut	GT2	Porsche 997 GT3-RSR	Porsche 3.8 L Flat-6	**MNZ**; 6	**VAL**; Ret	NÜR; 9	SPA; Ret	SIL; 2	INT	10th	11
2008	IMSA Performance Matmut	GT2	Porsche 997 GT3-RSR	Porsche 3.8 L Flat-6	CAT; 3	MNZ; DSQ	SPA; 6	NÜR; 3	SIL; Ret		7th	15
2009	IMSA Performance Matmut	GT2	Porsche 997 GT3-RSR	Porsche 4.0 L Flat-6	CAT; Ret	SPA; 6	ALG; 2	NÜR; 5	SIL; 3		6th	19
2010	IMSA Performance Matmut	GT2	Porsche 997 GT3-RSR	Porsche 4.0 L Flat-6	LEC; 7	SPA; 5	ALG; 10	HUN; 3	SIL; 6		5th	47
2011	IMSA Performance Matmut	LMGTE Am	Porsche 997 GT3-RSR	Porsche 4.0 L Flat-6	**LEC**; 6	**SPA**; 1	IMO; 1	**SIL**; 1	**EST**; 1		1st	75
2012	IMSA Performance Matmut	LMGTE Am	Porsche 997 GT3-RSR	Porsche M97/74 4.0 L Flat-6	LEC; 2	DON; 1	**PET**; 1				1st	94
2014	IMSA Performance Matmut	LMGTE	Porsche 997 GT3-RSR	Porsche M97/74 4.0 L Flat-6	SIL; 3	IMO; 6	RBR; Ret	LEC; 8	EST; 9		10th	29
2018	EbiMotors	LMGTE	Porsche 911 RSR	Porsche 4.0 L Flat-6	LEC; 3	**MNZ**; 3	RBR	SIL	SPA	ALG	9th	31

=== Complete FIA World Endurance Championship results ===
Year	Entrant	Class	Car	Engine	1	2	3	4	5	6	7	8	Rank	Points
2013	IMSA Performance Matmut	LMGTE Am	Porsche 911 GT3 RSR	Porsche 4.0 L Flat-6	SIL; 7	SPA; 6	LMS; 1	SÃO; 4	COA; 3	FUJ; 5	SHA; 2	BHR; 6	3rd	122

=== Complete GT World Challenge Europe results ===
==== GT World Challenge Europe Endurance Cup ====
(Races in bold indicate pole position) (Races in italics indicate fastest lap)

Year	Team	Car	Class	1	2	3	4	5	6	7	Pos.	Points
2016	IMSA Performance	Porsche 911 GT3 R	Pro-Am	MNZ; 25	SIL; 41	LEC; 23	SPA; 6H; 29	SPA; 12H; 21	SPA; 24H; 10	NÜR; 41	11th	35
