= Soheil Ayari =

French-Iranian race car driver

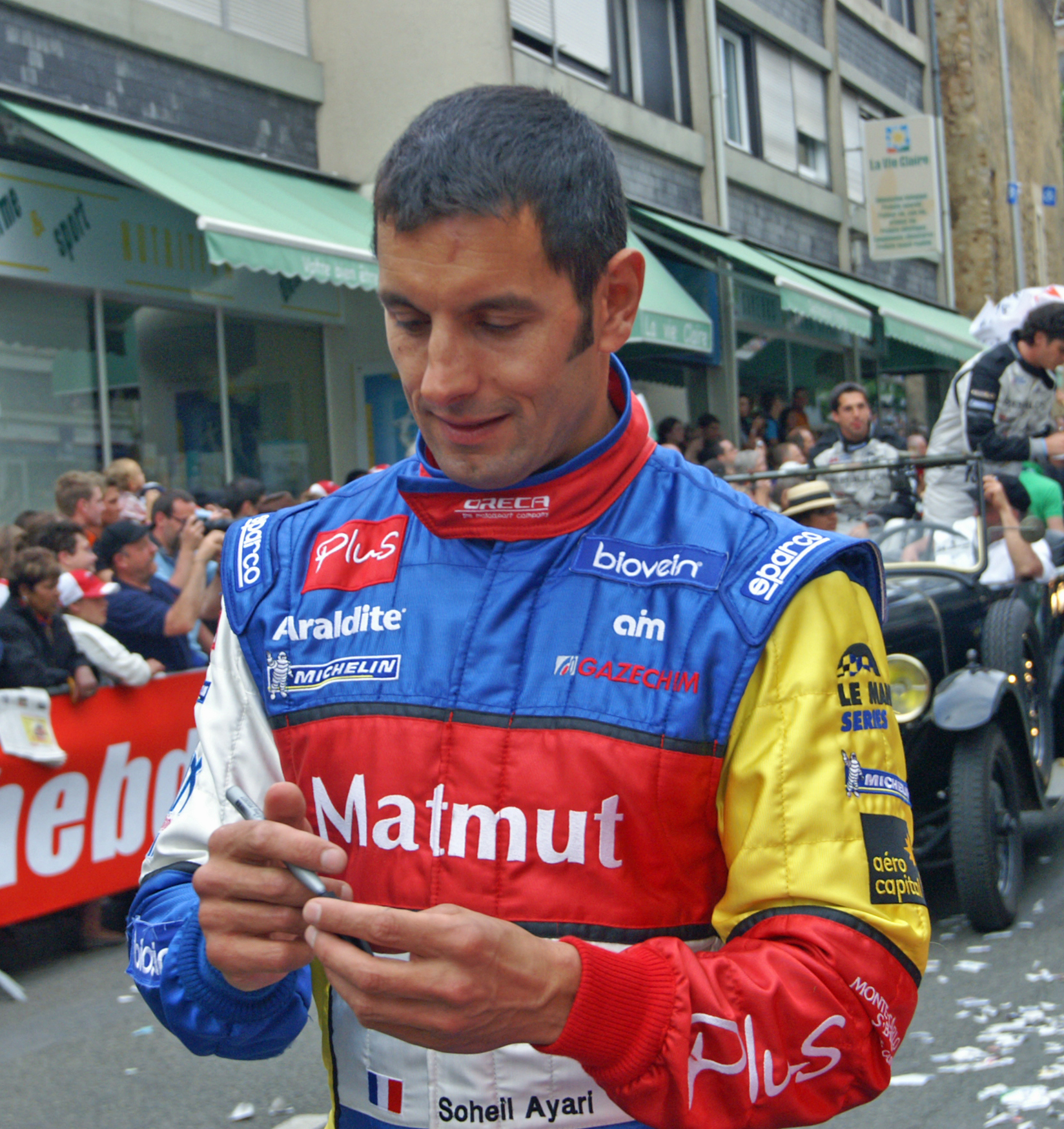
- Ayari in 2009
- Nationality: (France) French
- Born: 5 April 1970 (age 56) Aix-les-Baines, Savoie
- Categorisation: FIA Platinum (until 2012); FIA Gold (2013–2020); FIA Silver (2021–)

24 Hours of Le Mans career
- Years: 1997, 1999, 2003–2005, 2007–2012, 2014
- Teams: Viper Team Oreca, Pescarolo Sport, Pecom Racing
- Best finish: 4th (2004, 2010)
- Class wins: 0

Soheil Ayari (born 5 April 1970) is a French-Iranian race car driver born in Aix-les-Bains, Savoie, from an Iranian father and a French mother. He won the French Formula Ford championship of 1994, Formula Three championship of 1996 and the Macau Grand Prix of 1997. From 1997 until 2000, he competed in Formula 3000 where he won two races before moving on to the French Supertouring Championship in 2001 where he became champion in 2002, 2004 and 2005.

In 2006 and 2007, Ayari drove in GT Championship, in GT1 for Team Oreca (on a Saleen S7-R). He became French champion in 2006 & 2007 and won the European Le Mans séries championship in 2007 with Stephane Ortelli. In 2008 & 2009, he drove a Corvette GT 1 in French GT 3 championship before joining the Audi ORECA Team in 2010. In 2011, he raced and won two championships : ILMC LMP2 (Signatech Nissan) and International Open GT with JMB Ferrari F458 GT2.

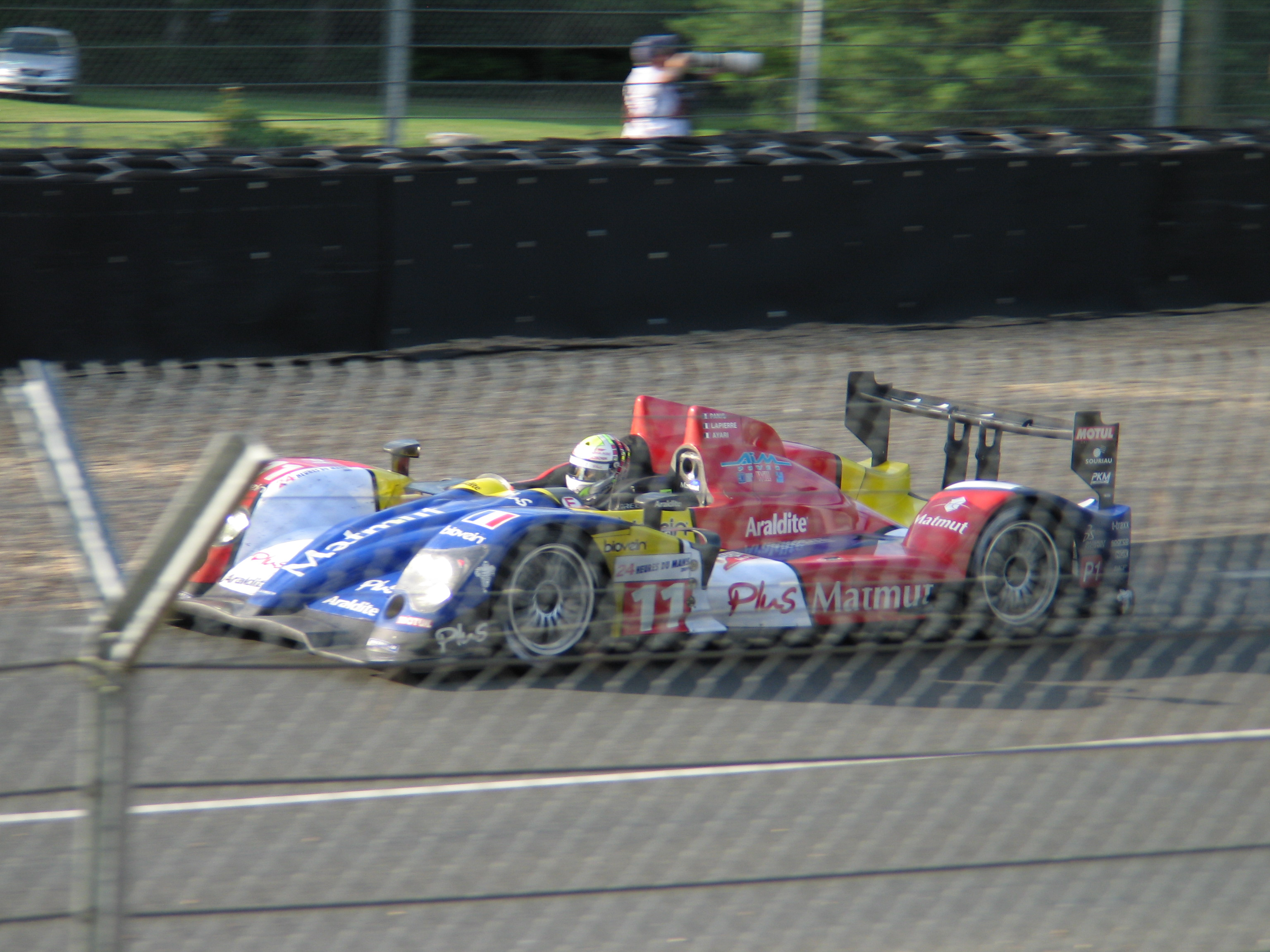
Ayari driving the Oreca 01 during the 2009 24 Hours of Le Mans.

Ayari is also a famous 24 Hours of Le Mans driver with eleven starts in GT 1, LMP1 & LMP2. Best results over all were fourth in 2004 ((Pescarolo)) & 2010 (ORECA 01)), fifth in 2009 ((ORECA)) and second LMP2 (Signatech Nissan) in 2011.

In 2014, Ayari was in the European Le Mans Series, and in 2015, was in the French GT Championship in which he remained in 2016. In 2017, he switched to the GT4 European Southern Cup and in 2018, moved into French GT's again. Ayari also works as a journalist specialising in track tests and races in historic events.

== Racing record ==
=== Complete International Formula 3000 results ===
(key) (Races in bold indicate pole position) (Races in italics indicate fastest lap)

Year	Entrant	1	2	3	4	5	6	7	8	9	10	11	12	DC	Points
1997	Team Astromega	SIL; Ret	PAU; 6	HEL; 1	NÜR; 19	PER; Ret	HOC; Ret	A1R; 10	SPA; Ret	MUG; 6	JER; Ret			8th	12
1998	Durango Formula	OSC; Ret	IMO; Ret	CAT; 5	SIL; Ret	MON; DNQ	PAU; Ret	**A1R**; 1	HOC; Ret	HUN; Ret	SPA; 3	PER; 3	NÜR; Ret	5th	20
1999	Cica Team Oreca	IMO; Ret	MON; Ret	CAT; 10	MAG; 8	SIL; 4	A1R; 2	HOC; 12	HUN; 4	SPA; Ret	NÜR; 4			7th	15
2000	Coloni Motorsport	IMO; 14	SIL; 6	CAT; Ret	NÜR; Ret	MON; Ret	MAG; 22	A1R; Ret	HOC					24th	1
2000	WRT Racing									HUN; 13	SPA; 14			24th	1

=== American open–wheel racing results ===
(key) (Races in bold indicate pole position)

==== Indy Lights ====
Year	Team	1	2	3	4	5	6	7	8	9	10	11	12	Rank	Points	Ref
2000	Brian Stewart Racing	LBH; 16	MIL	DET	POR	MIS	CHI	MOH	VAN	LS	STL	HOU	FON	**21st**	**0**	

=== 24 Hours of Le Mans results ===
Year	Team	Co-Drivers	Car	Class	Laps	Pos.	Class Pos.
1997	(France) Viper Team Oreca	(United States) Tommy Archer (Belgium) Marc Duez	Chrysler Viper GTS-R	GT2	76	DNF	DNF
1999	(France) Viper Team Oreca	(United States) David Donohue (France) Jean-Philippe Belloc	Chrysler Viper GTS-R	GTS	271	DNF	DNF
2003	(France) Pescarolo Sport	(France) Éric Hélary (France) Nicolas Minassian	Courage C60-Peugeot	LMP900	352	9th	7th
2004	(France) Pescarolo Sport	(France) Érik Comas (France) Benoît Tréluyer	Pescarolo C60-Judd	LMP1	361	4th	4th
2005	(France) Pescarolo Sport	(France) Éric Hélary (France) Sébastien Loeb	Pescarolo C60 Hybrid-Judd	LMP1	288	DNF	DNF
2007	(France) Team Oreca	(Monaco) Stéphane Ortelli (France) Nicolas Lapierre	Saleen S7-R	GT1	318	16th	9th
2008	(France) Team Oreca-Matmut	(France) Loïc Duval (France) Laurent Groppi	Courage-Oreca LC70-Judd	LMP1	357	8th	8th
2009	(France) Team Oreca-Matmut AIM	(France) Olivier Panis (France) Nicolas Lapierre	Oreca 01-AIM	LMP1	370	5th	5th
2010	(France) AIM Team Oreca-Matmut	(France) Didier André (United Kingdom) Andy Meyrick	Oreca 01-AIM	LMP1	369	4th	4th
2011	(France) Signatech Nissan	(France) Franck Mailleux (Spain) Lucas Ordoñez	Oreca 03-Nissan	LMP2	320	9th	**2nd**
2012	(Argentina) PeCom Racing	(Argentina) Luís Pérez Companc (Germany) Pierre Kaffer	Oreca 03-Nissan	LMP2	352	9th	**3rd**
2014	(France) Team Sofrev ASP	(France) Anthony Pons (France) Fabien Barthez	Ferrari 458 Italia GT2	GTE; Am	325	29th	9th

=== Complete World Touring Car Championship results ===
(key) (Races in bold indicate pole position) (Races in italics indicate fastest lap)

Year	Team	Car	1	2	3	4	5	6	7	8	9	10	11	12	13	14	15	16	17	18	19	20	DC	Points
2005	Peugeot Sport Denmark	Peugeot 407	ITA; 1	ITA; 2	FRA; 1	FRA; 2	GBR; 1	GBR; 2	SMR; 1	SMR; 2	MEX; 1	MEX; 2	BEL; 1; 23	BEL; 2 Ret	GER; 1	GER; 2	TUR; 1	TUR; 2	ESP; 1	ESP; 2	MAC; 1	MAC; 2	NC	0

=== FIA GT Series results ===
Year	Class	Team	Car	1	2	3	4	5	6	7	8	9	10	11	12	Pos.	Points	Ref
2013	Pro-Am	SOFREV Auto Sport Promotion	Ferrari	NOG; QR; Ret	NOG; CR; 19	ZOL; QR	ZOL; CR	ZAN; QR	ZAN; QR	SVK; QR	SVK; CR	NAV; QR	NAV; CR	BAK; QR	BAK; CR	20th	4	

Sporting positions
Preceded by Laurent Rédon	French Formula Three; Champion; 1996	Succeeded by Patrice Gay
Preceded by Ralph Firman	Macau Grand Prix; Winner; 1997	Succeeded by Peter Dumbreck
Preceded by Jean-Philippe Dayraut	French Touring Car Champion; 2002	Succeeded by Christophe Bouchut
Preceded by Christophe Bouchut	French Touring Car Champion; 2004-2005	Succeeded by None
Preceded by Olivier Thévenin; Patrick Bornhauser	FFSA GT Champion; 2006 with: (Bruno Hernandez)	Succeeded by Soheil Ayari; Raymond Narac
Preceded by Soheil Ayari; Bruno Hernandez	FFSA GT Champion; 2007 with: (Raymond Narac)	Succeeded by Christophe Bouchut; Patrick Bornhauser
Preceded by Álvaro Barba; Pierre Kaffer	International GT Open champion 2011	Succeeded by Federico Leo; Gianmaria Bruni
