= FFSA GT Championship =

Auto racing championship in France

- Category: GT4 sports cars
- Country: France
- Inaugural season: 1997
- Drivers' champion: Pro-Am: (France) Fabien Michal; Pro-Am: (France) Gregory Guilvert; Am: (France) Nicolas Gomar; Am: (France) Julien Lambert
- Teams' champion: Pro-Am: (France) CMR; Am: (France) AGS Events
- Official website: Official website

The FFSA GT Championship (Championnat de France FFSA GT) is a French Grand Touring-style sports car racing series that began in 1997. It is the main event of the Championnat de France des Circuits (formerly called Super Série FFSA and GT Tour).

It is controlled by the Fédération Française du Sport Automobile (FFSA) and from 2011 the series was organized by racing company Oreca. In 2017 the series was readopted by the SRO. Since the demise of the French Supertouring Championship after the 2005 season, the French GT has become France's major circuit racing championship.

== History ==
Founded by Patrick Peter in 1997 as an offshoot of the international BPR Global GT Series, this national version featured a wide variety of Grand Touring-style cars in multiple classes competing at the same time on mostly French courses. In 1998 the SRO Group took over the series and the classes were reorganized to align with the inaugural FIA GT Championship, also organised by SRO. SRO alignment continues through to today even though in 2011 series organization was handed over from SRO to Oreca, a French racing team, constructor, and organiser of the Sportscar Winter Series and the former Formula Le Mans Cup.

The main class has used GTS car regulations from 1997 to 2004, GT1 from 2005 to 2009, and FIA GT3 from 2010 to 2016. The championship featured classes for both professionals and amateurs. GT3 rules included extensive performance balancing and handicap weights to make cars artificially more equal.

In 2016, grids depleted and Oreca cancelled the championship. For the 2017 season, the SRO Group became again the promoter and the GT4 regulations were adopted.

As of 2023 the series is known as FFSA GT - GT4 France.

== Circuits ==
- (France) Circuit d'Albi (1997, 2002–2011, 2020–2022)
- (France) Circuit Bugatti (1998–1999, 2001–2006, 2012–2015)
- (France) Circuit de Charade (1998)
- (France) Circuit de Dijon-Prenois (1997–1998, 2000, 2002–2012, 2017–2018, 2023–present)
- (France) Circuit de Lédenon (1999–2015, 2019, 2021–2024)
- (France) Circuit de Nevers Magny-Cours (1997–2015, 2017–present)
- (France) Circuit de Pau (1999, 2001–2003, 2005, 2017–2019)
- (Belgium) Circuit de Spa-Francorchamps (1998, 2008, 2013–2015, 2019, 2021–2022, 2024–present)
- (France) Circuit du Val de Vienne (1997, 2000–2001, 2003–2015, 2023)
- (France) Circuit Paul Armagnac (1997–2011, 2014, 2016–present)
- (France) Circuit Paul Ricard (1997, 2009, 2011–2015, 2017–present)
- (Spain) Circuit Ricardo Tormo (1999)
- (Spain) Circuito de Navarra (2012, 2015)
- (Hungary) Hungaroring (2000)
- (Italy) Imola Circuit (2013)
- (Italy) Monza Circuit (2001)

== Champions ==
Season	Driver	Car	Team
1997	(France) Patrice Goueslard	Porsche 911 GT2	Larbre
1998	(France) Jean-Pierre Jarier (France) François Lafon	Porsche 911 GT2	Sonauto
1999	(France) Jean-Pierre Jarier	Porsche 911 GT2	Sonauto
2000	(France) Dominique Dupuy (France) François Fiat	Chrysler Viper GTS-R	DDO
2001	(France) Dominique Dupuy (France) François Fiat	Chrysler Viper GTS-R	DDO
2002	(France) Philippe Soulan (France) Patrice Goueslard	Porsche 911 GT2	Nourry
2003	(Belgium) Didier Defourny (France) Patrice Goueslard	Chrysler Viper GTS-R	Larbre
2004	(France) Patrick Bornhauser	Chrysler Viper GTS-R	VBM
2005	(France) Olivier Thévenin (France) Patrick Bornhauser	Chrysler Viper GTS-R	VBM
2006	(France) Soheil Ayari (France) Bruno Hernandez	Saleen S7-R	Oreca
2007	(France) Soheil Ayari (France) Raymond Narac	Saleen S7-R	Oreca
2008	(France) Christophe Bouchut (France) Patrick Bornhauser	Saleen S7-R	Larbre
2009	(France) Eric Debard	Chevrolet Corvette C6.R	DKR
2010	(France) Laurent Groppi (France) Patrick Bornhauser	Porsche 911 GT3 R	Larbre
2011	(France) Laurent Pasquali (France) Anthony Beltoise	Porsche 997 GT3 R	Pro GT
2012	(France) Henry Hassid (France) Anthony Beltoise	Porsche 997 GT3 R	Pro GT
2013	(France) Morgan Moulin-Traffort (France) Fabien Barthez	Ferrari 458 Italia	Team Sofrev ASP
2014	(France) Raymond Narac (France) Nicolas Armindo	Porsche 911 GT3 R	IMSA Performance Matmut
2015	(France) Sébastien Dumez (France) Raymond Narac (France) Olivier Pernaut	Porsche 911 GT3 R	IMSA Performance Matmut
2016	(France) Soheil Ayari (France) Laurent Pasquali (France) Nicolas Tardif	Ferrari 458 Italia GT3	Sport Garage
2017	(France) Mike Parisy (France) Gilles Vannelet	Porsche Cayman Clubsport MR GT4	Speed Car
2018	(France) Grégory Guilvert (France) Fabien Michal	Audi R8 LMS GT4	Saintéloc Racing
2019	(France) Grégory Guilvert (France) Fabien Michal	Audi R8 LMS GT4	Saintéloc Racing
