= 2012 Petit Le Mans =

Sportscar endurance race in Georgia, US

The Track map of Road Atlanta

The 15th Annual Petit Le Mans was an endurance auto race held at the Road Atlanta circuit in Braselton, Georgia on October 20, 2012. The race served as the final round of both the American Le Mans Series and European Le Mans Series seasons.

Nicolas Prost, Neel Jani, and Andrea Belicchi of Rebellion Racing won the event by a three lap margin after qualifying on pole position in only the team's second attempt at the race. Level 5 Motorsports's two cars finished in second and third overall and lead the P2 category, while TDS Racing led home the European Le Mans Series contingent with fourth place overall. CORE Autosport won the PC category by two laps over RSR Racing. In GT, Extreme Speed Motorsports led the class for Ferrari over Corvette Racing, while IMSA Performance Matmut was the sole survivor in the GTE Am category. NGT Motorsport dominated the GTC class with five laps over TRG who held second and third place.

== Race ==
=== Result ===
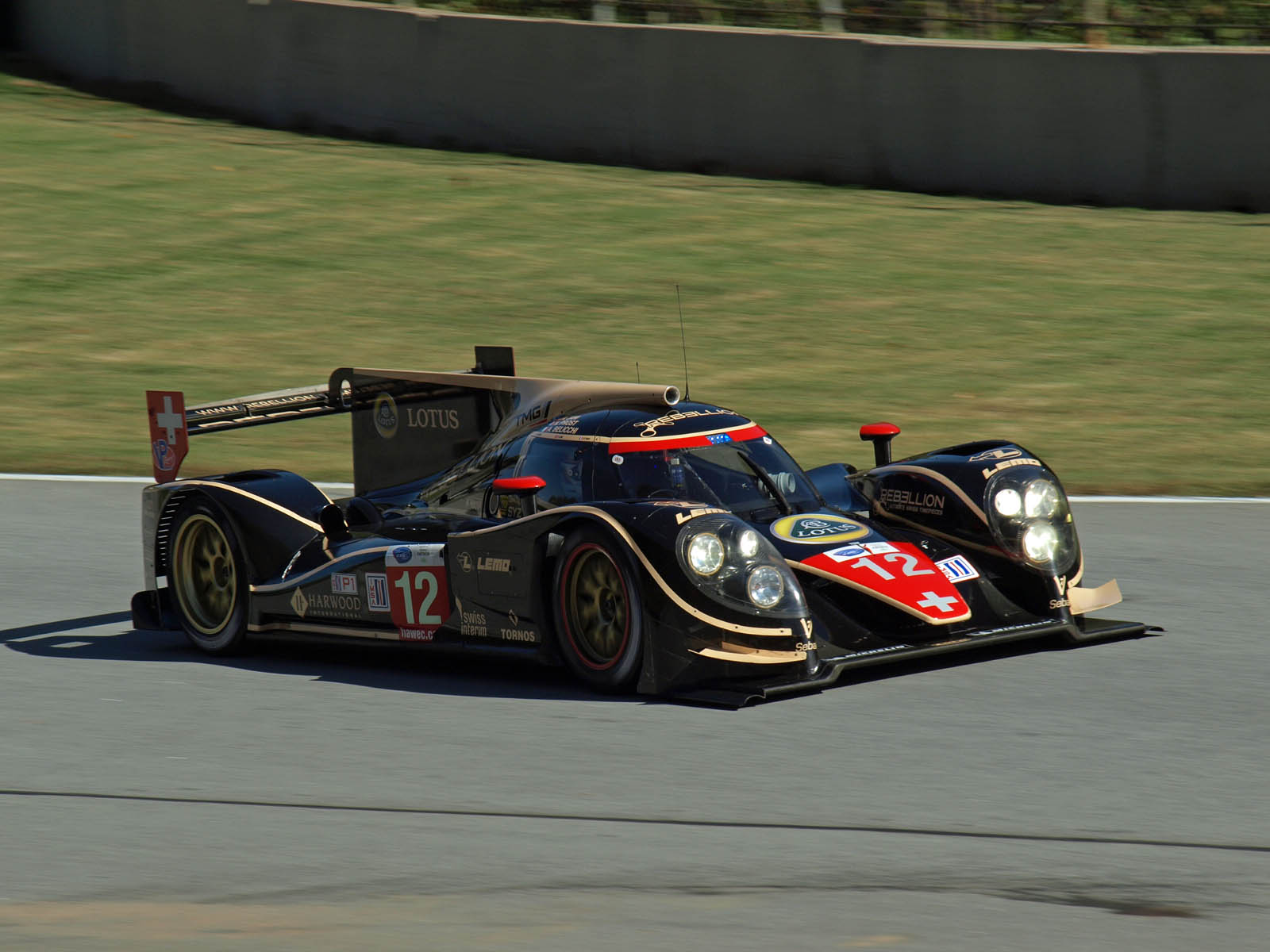
Rebellion Racing won the race overall and in P1

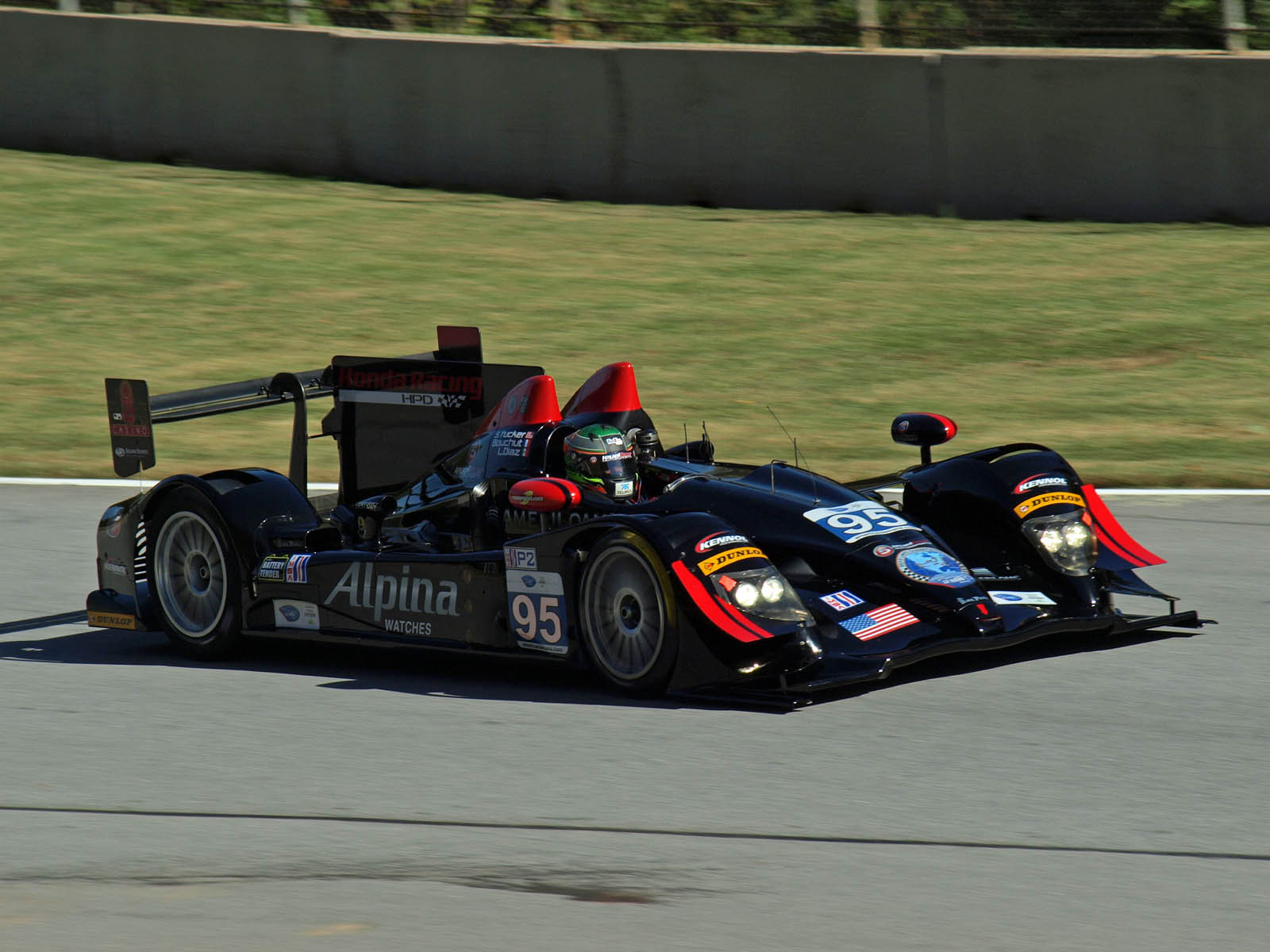
Level 5 Motorsports won the P2 class.

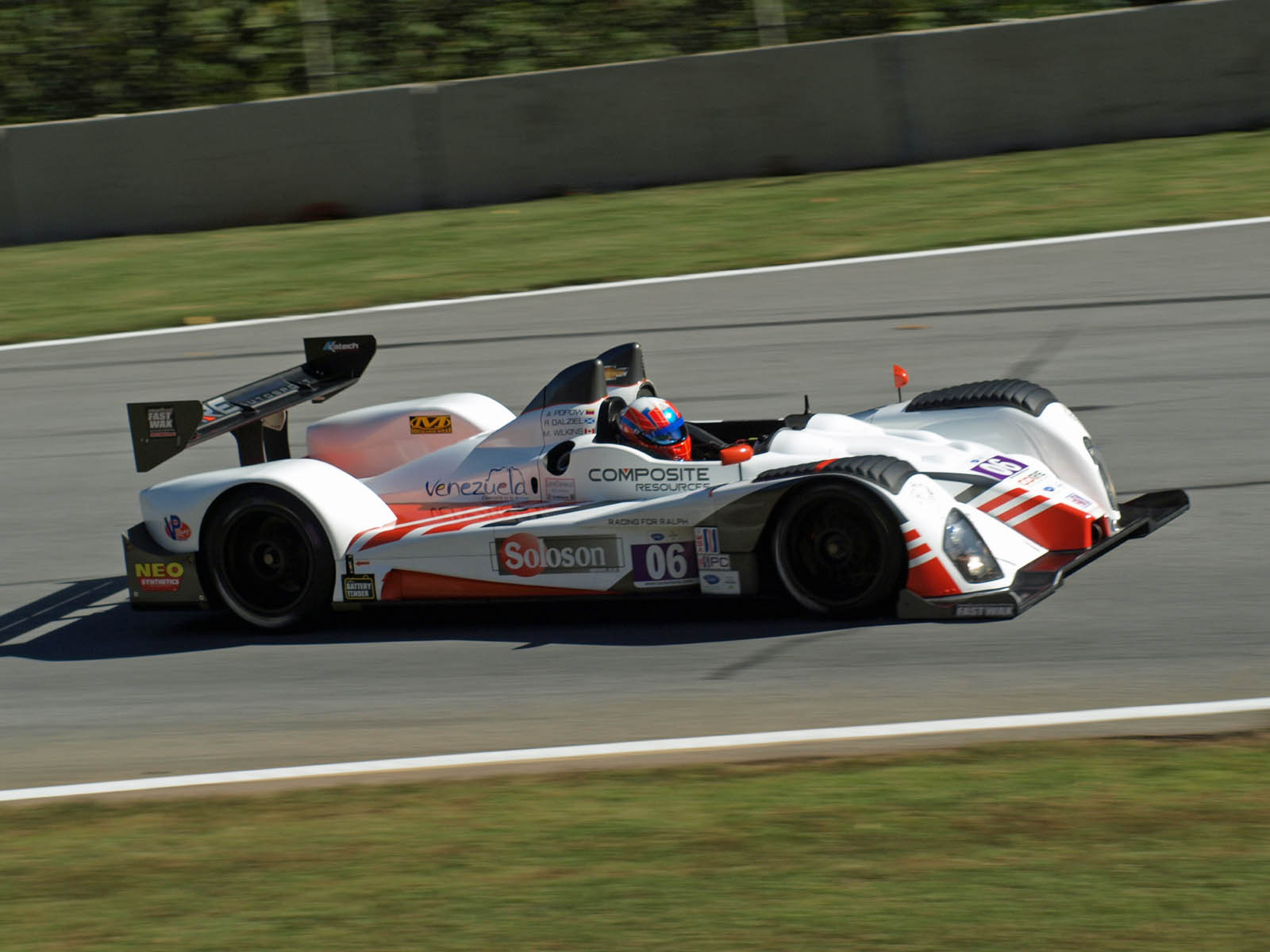
CORE Autosport won the LMPC class.

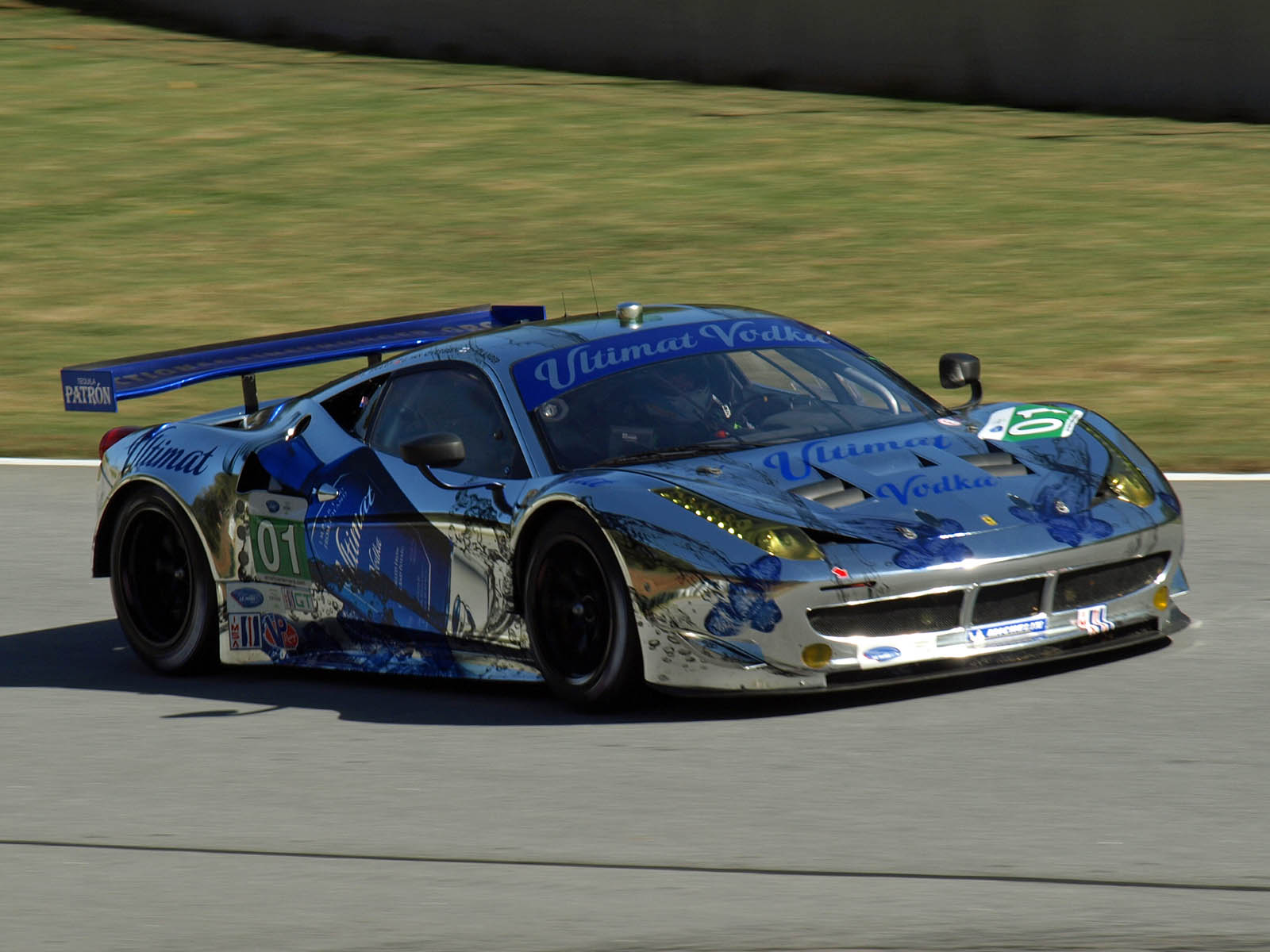
The GT class winners were Extreme Speed Motorsports.

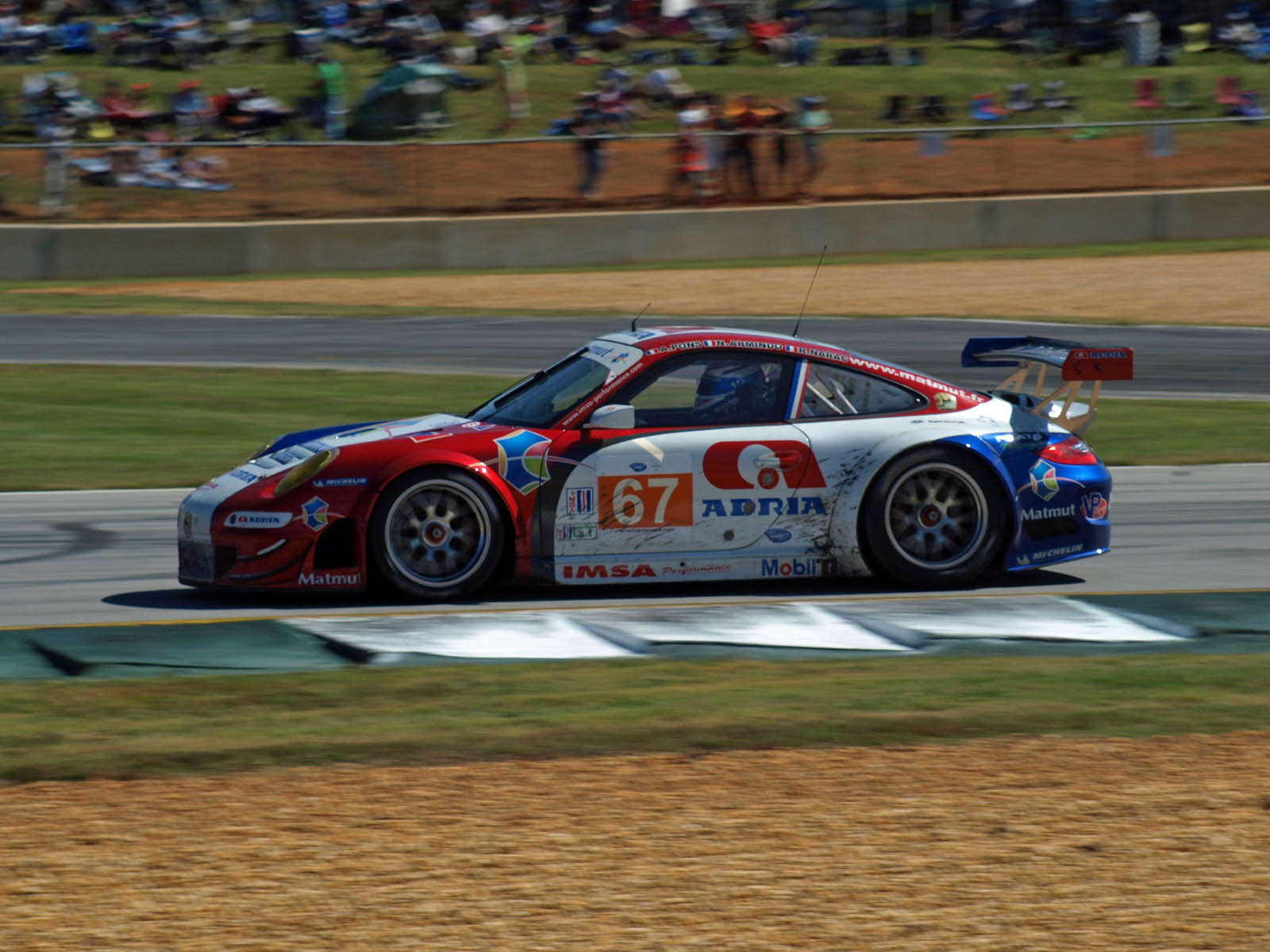
The GTE-Am class for ELMS competitors was won by IMSA Performance.

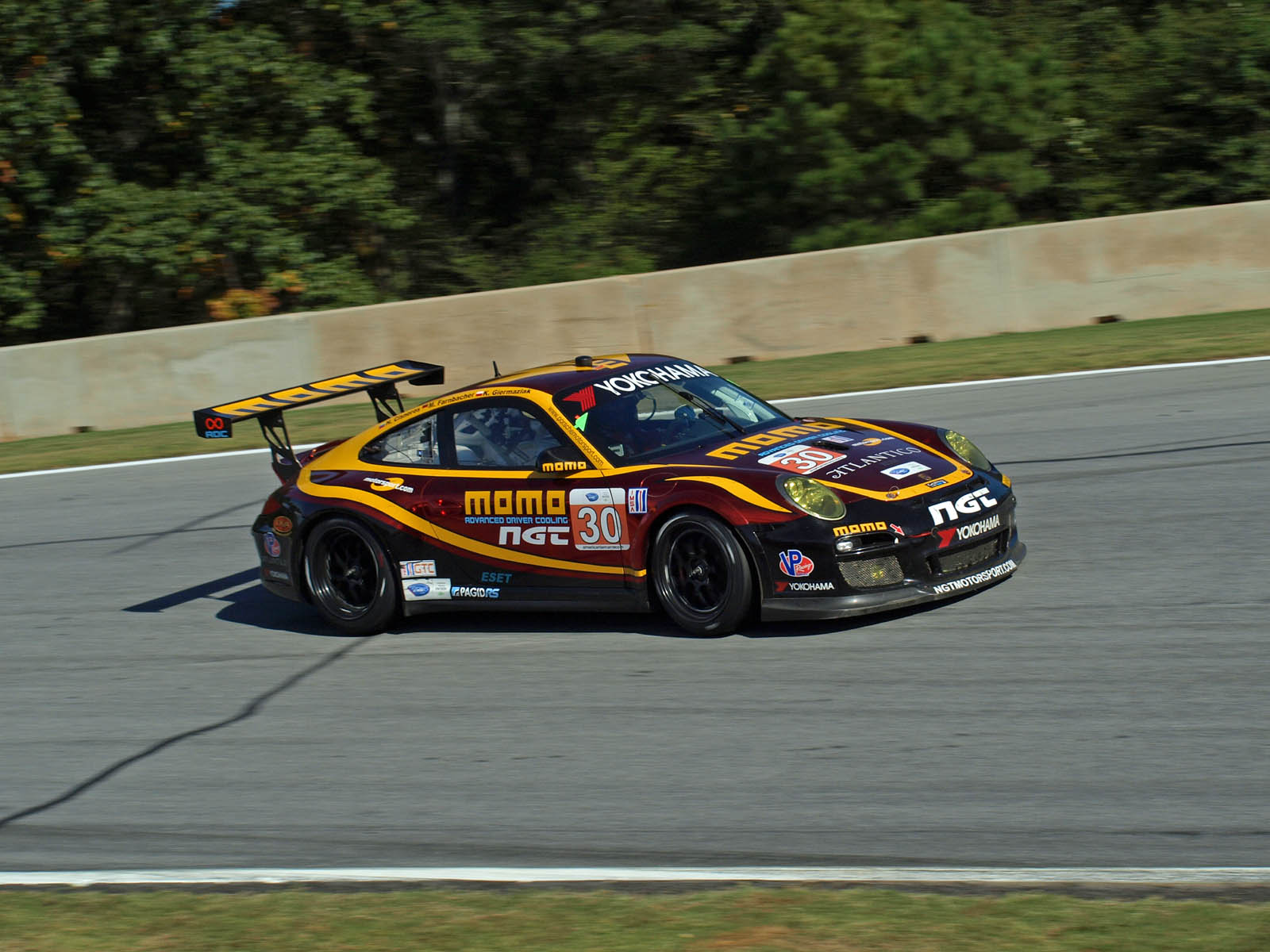
NGT Motorsports took honors in the GTC class.

Class winners in bold. Cars failing to complete 70% of their class winner's distance are marked as Not Classified (NC).

Pos	Class	No	Team	Drivers	Chassis	Tire	Laps
Pos	Class	No	Team	Drivers	Engine	Tire	Laps
1	**P1**	**12**	**(Switzerland) Rebellion Racing**	**(Switzerland) Neel Jani (France) Nicolas Prost (Italy) Andrea Belicchi**	**Lola B12/60**	M	**394**
1	**P1**	**12**	**(Switzerland) Rebellion Racing**	**(Switzerland) Neel Jani (France) Nicolas Prost (Italy) Andrea Belicchi**	**Toyota RV8KLM 3.4 L V8**	M	**394**
2	**P2**	**95**	**(United States) Level 5 Motorsports**	**(United States) Scott Tucker (France) Christophe Bouchut (Mexico) Luis Díaz**	**HPD ARX-03b**	D	**391**
2	**P2**	**95**	**(United States) Level 5 Motorsports**	**(United States) Scott Tucker (France) Christophe Bouchut (Mexico) Luis Díaz**	**Honda HR28TT 2.8 L Turbo V6**	D	**391**
3	P2	055	(United States) Level 5 Motorsports	(United States) Scott Tucker (United Kingdom) Dario Franchitti (United Kingdom) Marino Franchitti	HPD ARX-03b	D	390
3	P2	055	(United States) Level 5 Motorsports	(United States) Scott Tucker (United Kingdom) Dario Franchitti (United Kingdom) Marino Franchitti	Honda HR28TT 2.8 L Turbo V6	D	390
4	P2	46	(France) Thiriet by TDS Racing	(France) Pierre Thiriet (France) Christophe Tinseau (Switzerland) Mathias Beche	Oreca 03	D	390
4	P2	46	(France) Thiriet by TDS Racing	(France) Pierre Thiriet (France) Christophe Tinseau (Switzerland) Mathias Beche	Nissan VK45DE 4.5 L V8	D	390
5		0	(United States) DeltaWing Nissan	(United States) Gunnar Jeannette (Spain) Lucas Ordóñez	DeltaWing	M	388
5		0	(United States) DeltaWing Nissan	(United States) Gunnar Jeannette (Spain) Lucas Ordóñez	Nissan 1.6 L Turbo I4	M	388
6	**PC**	**06**	**(United States) CORE Autosport**	**(Venezuela) Alex Popow (United Kingdom) Ryan Dalziel (Canada) Mark Wilkins**	**Oreca FLM09**	M	**385**
6	**PC**	**06**	**(United States) CORE Autosport**	**(Venezuela) Alex Popow (United Kingdom) Ryan Dalziel (Canada) Mark Wilkins**	**Chevrolet LS3 6.2 L V8**	M	**385**
7	P2	35	(France) OAK Racing	(France) Jacques Nicolet (France) Olivier Pla (Belgium) Bertrand Baguette	Morgan LMP2	D	383
7	P2	35	(France) OAK Racing	(France) Jacques Nicolet (France) Olivier Pla (Belgium) Bertrand Baguette	Nissan VK45DE 4.5 L V8	D	383
8	PC	9	(United States) RSR Racing	(Brazil) Bruno Junqueira (United States) Tomy Drissi (Puerto Rico) Ricardo Vera	Oreca FLM09	M	383
8	PC	9	(United States) RSR Racing	(Brazil) Bruno Junqueira (United States) Tomy Drissi (Puerto Rico) Ricardo Vera	Chevrolet LS3 6.2 L V8	M	383
9	PC	52	(United States) PR1 Mathiasen Motorsports	(Mexico) Rudy Junco, Jr. (United States) Ken Dobson (Ecuador) Elton Julian	Oreca FLM09	M	382
9	PC	52	(United States) PR1 Mathiasen Motorsports	(Mexico) Rudy Junco, Jr. (United States) Ken Dobson (Ecuador) Elton Julian	Chevrolet LS3 6.2 L V8	M	382
10	PC	05	(United States) CORE Autosport	(United States) Colin Braun (United States) Jon Bennett (Mexico) Ricardo González	Oreca FLM09	M	381
10	PC	05	(United States) CORE Autosport	(United States) Colin Braun (United States) Jon Bennett (Mexico) Ricardo González	Chevrolet LS3 6.2 L V8	M	381
11	PC	8	(United States) Merchant Services Racing	(Canada) Kyle Marcelli (United States) Matt Downs (United States) Chapman Ducote	Oreca FLM09	M	376
11	PC	8	(United States) Merchant Services Racing	(Canada) Kyle Marcelli (United States) Matt Downs (United States) Chapman Ducote	Chevrolet LS3 6.2 L V8	M	376
12	**GT**	**01**	**(United States) Extreme Speed Motorsports**	**(United States) Scott Sharp (United States) Johannes van Overbeek (Finland) Toni Vilander**	**Ferrari 458 Italia GT2**	M	**375**
12	**GT**	**01**	**(United States) Extreme Speed Motorsports**	**(United States) Scott Sharp (United States) Johannes van Overbeek (Finland) Toni Vilander**	**Ferrari F136 4.5 L V8**	M	**375**
13	GT	3	(United States) Corvette Racing	(Denmark) Jan Magnussen (Spain) Antonio García (United States) Jordan Taylor	Chevrolet Corvette C6.R	M	375
13	GT	3	(United States) Corvette Racing	(Denmark) Jan Magnussen (Spain) Antonio García (United States) Jordan Taylor	Chevrolet LS5.5R 5.5 L V8	M	375
14	GT	55	(United States) BMW Team RLL	(United States) Bill Auberlen (Germany) Jörg Müller (United States) Jonathan Summerton	BMW M3 GT2	D	374
14	GT	55	(United States) BMW Team RLL	(United States) Bill Auberlen (Germany) Jörg Müller (United States) Jonathan Summerton	BMW S65 4.0 L V8	D	374
15	GT	56	(United States) BMW Team RLL	(Germany) Dirk Müller (Germany) Uwe Alzen (United States) Jonathan Summerton	BMW M3 GT2	D	373
15	GT	56	(United States) BMW Team RLL	(Germany) Dirk Müller (Germany) Uwe Alzen (United States) Jonathan Summerton	BMW S65 4.0 L V8	D	373
16	GT	45	(United States) Flying Lizard Motorsports	(United States) Patrick Long (Germany) Jörg Bergmeister (France) Patrick Pilet	Porsche 997 GT3-RSR	M	373
16	GT	45	(United States) Flying Lizard Motorsports	(United States) Patrick Long (Germany) Jörg Bergmeister (France) Patrick Pilet	Porsche M97/74 4.0 L Flat-6	M	373
17	GT	17	(United States) Team Falken Tire	(United States) Bryan Sellers (Germany) Wolf Henzler (Austria) Martin Ragginger	Porsche 997 GT3-RSR	F	372
17	GT	17	(United States) Team Falken Tire	(United States) Bryan Sellers (Germany) Wolf Henzler (Austria) Martin Ragginger	Porsche M97/74 4.0 L Flat-6	F	372
18	PC	25	(United States) Dempsey Racing	(United States) Duncan Ende (France) Henri Richard (United Kingdom) Ryan Lewis	Oreca FLM09	M	372
18	PC	25	(United States) Dempsey Racing	(United States) Duncan Ende (France) Henri Richard (United Kingdom) Ryan Lewis	Chevrolet LS3 6.2 L V8	M	372
19	GT	44	(United States) Flying Lizard Motorsports	(United States) Seth Neiman (Germany) Marco Holzer (United Kingdom) Nick Tandy	Porsche 997 GT3-RSR	M	369
19	GT	44	(United States) Flying Lizard Motorsports	(United States) Seth Neiman (Germany) Marco Holzer (United Kingdom) Nick Tandy	Porsche M97/74 4.0 L Flat-6	M	369
20	GT	91	(United States) SRT Motorsports	(Canada) Kuno Wittmer (Germany) Dominik Farnbacher (United States) Ryan Hunter-Reay	SRT Viper GTS-R	M	369
20	GT	91	(United States) SRT Motorsports	(Canada) Kuno Wittmer (Germany) Dominik Farnbacher (United States) Ryan Hunter-Reay	SRT 8.0 L V10	M	369
21	GT	02	(United States) Extreme Speed Motorsports	(United States) Ed Brown (United States) Guy Cosmo (United States) Anthony Lazzaro	Ferrari 458 Italia GT2	M	368
21	GT	02	(United States) Extreme Speed Motorsports	(United States) Ed Brown (United States) Guy Cosmo (United States) Anthony Lazzaro	Ferrari F136 4.5 L V8	M	368
22	GT	48	(United States) Paul Miller Racing	(United States) Bryce Miller (Germany) Sascha Maassen (Austria) Richard Lietz	Porsche 997 GT3-RSR	D	367
22	GT	48	(United States) Paul Miller Racing	(United States) Bryce Miller (Germany) Sascha Maassen (Austria) Richard Lietz	Porsche M97/74 4.0 L Flat-6	D	367
23	**GTE; Am**	**67**	**(France) IMSA Performance Matmut**	**(France) Anthony Pons (France) Nicolas Armindo (France) Raymond Narac**	**Porsche 997 GT3-RSR**	M	**363**
23	**GTE; Am**	**67**	**(France) IMSA Performance Matmut**	**(France) Anthony Pons (France) Nicolas Armindo (France) Raymond Narac**	**Porsche M97/74 4.0 L Flat-6**	M	**363**
24	GT	23	(United States) Lotus Alex Job Racing	(United States) Townsend Bell (United States) Bill Sweedler (United Kingdom) Johnny Mowlem	Lotus Evora GTE	Y	360
24	GT	23	(United States) Lotus Alex Job Racing	(United States) Townsend Bell (United States) Bill Sweedler (United Kingdom) Johnny Mowlem	Toyota-Cosworth 3.5 L V6	Y	360
25	**GTC**	**30**	**(United States) NGT Motorsport**	**(United States) Henrique Cisneros (Germany) Mario Farnbacher (Poland) Jakub Giermaziak**	**Porsche 997 GT3 Cup**	Y	**356**
25	**GTC**	**30**	**(United States) NGT Motorsport**	**(United States) Henrique Cisneros (Germany) Mario Farnbacher (Poland) Jakub Giermaziak**	**Porsche M97/74 4.0 L Flat-6**	Y	**356**
26	GTC	66	(United States) TRG	(Venezuela) Emilio Di Guida (United States) Spencer Pumpelly (United States) Nelson Canache	Porsche 997 GT3 Cup	Y	351
26	GTC	66	(United States) TRG	(Venezuela) Emilio Di Guida (United States) Spencer Pumpelly (United States) Nelson Canache	Porsche M97/74 4.0 L Flat-6	Y	351
27	GTC	68	(United States) TRG	(France) Emmanuel Collard (United States) Mike Hedlund (Mexico) Manuel Gutierrez, Jr.	Porsche 997 GT3 Cup	Y	351
27	GTC	68	(United States) TRG	(France) Emmanuel Collard (United States) Mike Hedlund (Mexico) Manuel Gutierrez, Jr.	Porsche M97/74 4.0 L Flat-6	Y	351
28	GTC	11	(United States) JDX Racing	(Canada) Chris Cumming (Canada) Michael Valiante (United States) Sean Johnston	Porsche 997 GT3 Cup	Y	351
28	GTC	11	(United States) JDX Racing	(Canada) Chris Cumming (Canada) Michael Valiante (United States) Sean Johnston	Porsche M97/74 4.0 L Flat-6	Y	351
29 DNF	GTC	22	(United States) Alex Job Racing	(United States) Leh Keen (United States) Cooper MacNeil (South Africa) Dion von Moltke	Porsche 997 GT3 Cup	Y	349
29 DNF	GTC	22	(United States) Alex Job Racing	(United States) Leh Keen (United States) Cooper MacNeil (South Africa) Dion von Moltke	Porsche M97/74 4.0 L Flat-6	Y	349
30	GT	4	(United States) Corvette Racing	(United Kingdom) Oliver Gavin (United Kingdom) Richard Westbrook (United States) Tommy Milner	Chevrolet Corvette C6.R	M	348
30	GT	4	(United States) Corvette Racing	(United Kingdom) Oliver Gavin (United Kingdom) Richard Westbrook (United States) Tommy Milner	Chevrolet LS5.5R 5.5 L V8	M	348
31	P1	16	(United States) Dyson Racing Team	(United States) Chris Dyson (United Kingdom) Guy Smith (United Kingdom) Steven Kane	Lola B12/60	D	338
31	P1	16	(United States) Dyson Racing Team	(United States) Chris Dyson (United Kingdom) Guy Smith (United Kingdom) Steven Kane	Mazda MZR-R 2.0 L Turbo I4 (Hybrid Butanol)	D	338
32	P2	1	(United Kingdom) Greaves Motorsport	(United Kingdom) Alex Brundle (United Kingdom) Alex Buncombe (United Kingdom) Tom Kimber-Smith	Zytek Z11SN	D	338
32	P2	1	(United Kingdom) Greaves Motorsport	(United Kingdom) Alex Brundle (United Kingdom) Alex Buncombe (United Kingdom) Tom Kimber-Smith	Nissan VK45DE 4.5 L V8	D	338
33	P1	6	(United States) Muscle Milk Pickett Racing	(Germany) Klaus Graf (Germany) Lucas Luhr (France) Romain Dumas	HPD ARX-03a	M	334
33	P1	6	(United States) Muscle Milk Pickett Racing	(Germany) Klaus Graf (Germany) Lucas Luhr (France) Romain Dumas	Honda AR6-LMV8 3.4 L V8	M	334
34 DNF	P2	118	(Republic of Ireland) Murphy Prototypes	(United Kingdom) Warren Hughes (United Kingdom) Jody Firth (New Zealand) Brendon Hartley	Oreca 03	D	330
34 DNF	P2	118	(Republic of Ireland) Murphy Prototypes	(United Kingdom) Warren Hughes (United Kingdom) Jody Firth (New Zealand) Brendon Hartley	Nissan VK45DE 4.5 L V8	D	330
35 DNF	P1	20	(United States) Dyson Racing Team	(Canada) Tony Burgess (United States) Chris McMurry (South Africa) Mark Patterson	Lola B11/66	D	322
35 DNF	P1	20	(United States) Dyson Racing Team	(Canada) Tony Burgess (United States) Chris McMurry (South Africa) Mark Patterson	Mazda MZR-R 2.0 L Turbo I4 (Butanol)	D	322
36	GTC	31	(United States) NGT Motorsport	(Venezuela) Angel Benitez, Jr. (United States) Mark Bullitt (United States) Jeff Segal	Porsche 997 GT3 Cup	Y	318
36	GTC	31	(United States) NGT Motorsport	(Venezuela) Angel Benitez, Jr. (United States) Mark Bullitt (United States) Jeff Segal	Porsche M97/74 4.0 L Flat-6	Y	318
37 DNF	GTC	24	(United States) Competition Motorsports	(United States) Andrew Davis (United States) Michael Avenatti (Australia) David Calvert-Jones	Porsche 997 GT3 Cup	Y	267
37 DNF	GTC	24	(United States) Competition Motorsports	(United States) Andrew Davis (United States) Michael Avenatti (Australia) David Calvert-Jones	Porsche M97/74 4.0 L Flat-6	Y	267
38 DNF	GTE; Am	60	(Italy) AF Corse	(Italy) Piergiuseppe Perazzini (Italy) Marco Cioci (Republic of Ireland) Matt Griffin	Ferrari 458 Italia GT2	M	232
38 DNF	GTE; Am	60	(Italy) AF Corse	(Italy) Piergiuseppe Perazzini (Italy) Marco Cioci (Republic of Ireland) Matt Griffin	Ferrari F136 4.5 L V8	M	232
39 DNF	GT	93	(United States) SRT Motorsports	(United States) Tommy Kendall (United States) Jonathan Bomarito (Belgium) Marc Goossens	SRT Viper GTS-R	M	224
39 DNF	GT	93	(United States) SRT Motorsports	(United States) Tommy Kendall (United States) Jonathan Bomarito (Belgium) Marc Goossens	SRT 8.0 L V10	M	224
40 DNF	P2	27	(United States) Dempsey Racing	(United States) Patrick Dempsey (United States) Joe Foster (United States) Dane Cameron	Lola B12/87	M	220
40 DNF	P2	27	(United States) Dempsey Racing	(United States) Patrick Dempsey (United States) Joe Foster (United States) Dane Cameron	Judd DB 3.6 L V8	M	220
41 DNF	GTC	34	(United States) Green Hornet Racing	(United States) Peter LeSaffre (United States) Brian Wong (Republic of Ireland) Damien Faulkner	Porsche 997 GT3 Cup	Y	40
41 DNF	GTC	34	(United States) Green Hornet Racing	(United States) Peter LeSaffre (United States) Brian Wong (Republic of Ireland) Damien Faulkner	Porsche M97/74 4.0 L Flat-6	Y	40
DSQ^{1}	P2	37	(United States) Conquest Endurance	(United Kingdom) Martin Plowman (Denmark) David Heinemeier Hansson (United States) Eric Lux	Morgan LMP2	D	391
DSQ^{1}	P2	37	(United States) Conquest Endurance	(United Kingdom) Martin Plowman (Denmark) David Heinemeier Hansson (United States) Eric Lux	Nissan VK45DE 4.5 L V8	D	391

- – The #37 Conquest Morgan-Nissan was disqualified for exceeding the maximum number of hours a single driver could be in the car.

American Le Mans Series
Previous race: American Le Mans Series VIR 240	2012 season	Next race: none

European Le Mans Series
Previous race: 6 Hours of Donington	2012 season	Next race: none
