= IMSA Performance =

French auto racing team

(France) IMSA LS Group Performance
- Founded: 2001
- Team principal(s): Raymond Narac; Franck Rava
- Current series: Porsche Carrera Cup France
- Former series: European Le Mans Series; FIA World Endurance Championship; International GT Open; FFSA GT Championship
- Noted drivers: (France) Raymond Narac (France) Nicolas Armindo (France) Anthony Pons
- Teams' Championships: 7 (FFSA GT 2005, 2006, 2007, 2008 GT2, PCCF 2007, FIA GT2 2010, LMS 2011 GTE-Am)
- Drivers' Championships: 5 (FFSA GT 2005, 2006, 2007, 2008 GT2, LMS 2011 GTE-Am)
- Website: https://www.imsa-performance.com/en/

IMSA LS Group Performance (also known as IMSA Performance Matmut or simply IMSA Performance) is a French auto racing team founded by Raymond Narac. The team is based in Saint-Jean-du-Cardonnay, Upper Normandy. IMSA stands for Innovation Mécanique Service Automobile. They currently operate a Porsche 911 GT3-RSR sports car in the European Le Mans Series and International GT Open. They are currently a Porsche Factory Team

== History ==
=== Beginnings ===
The team was founded in 2001 by Raymond Narac. The team did not start racing until 2004 when Narac entered the team into the Porsche Carrera Cup France and FFSA GT Championship. The team entered three cars in the FFSA GT Championship, all of the Porsche 996 GT3 Cup chassis' in the Cup1 class. Narac drove the first of the cars, No. 76 along with Yannick David under the name IMSA - Challenge 86. The team had a successful début at Nogaro winning in the Cup1 class. They finished third in the championship. In the Porsche Carrera Cup France, the team's only highlight was a win at Magny-Cours.

=== 2005 - 2006 ===
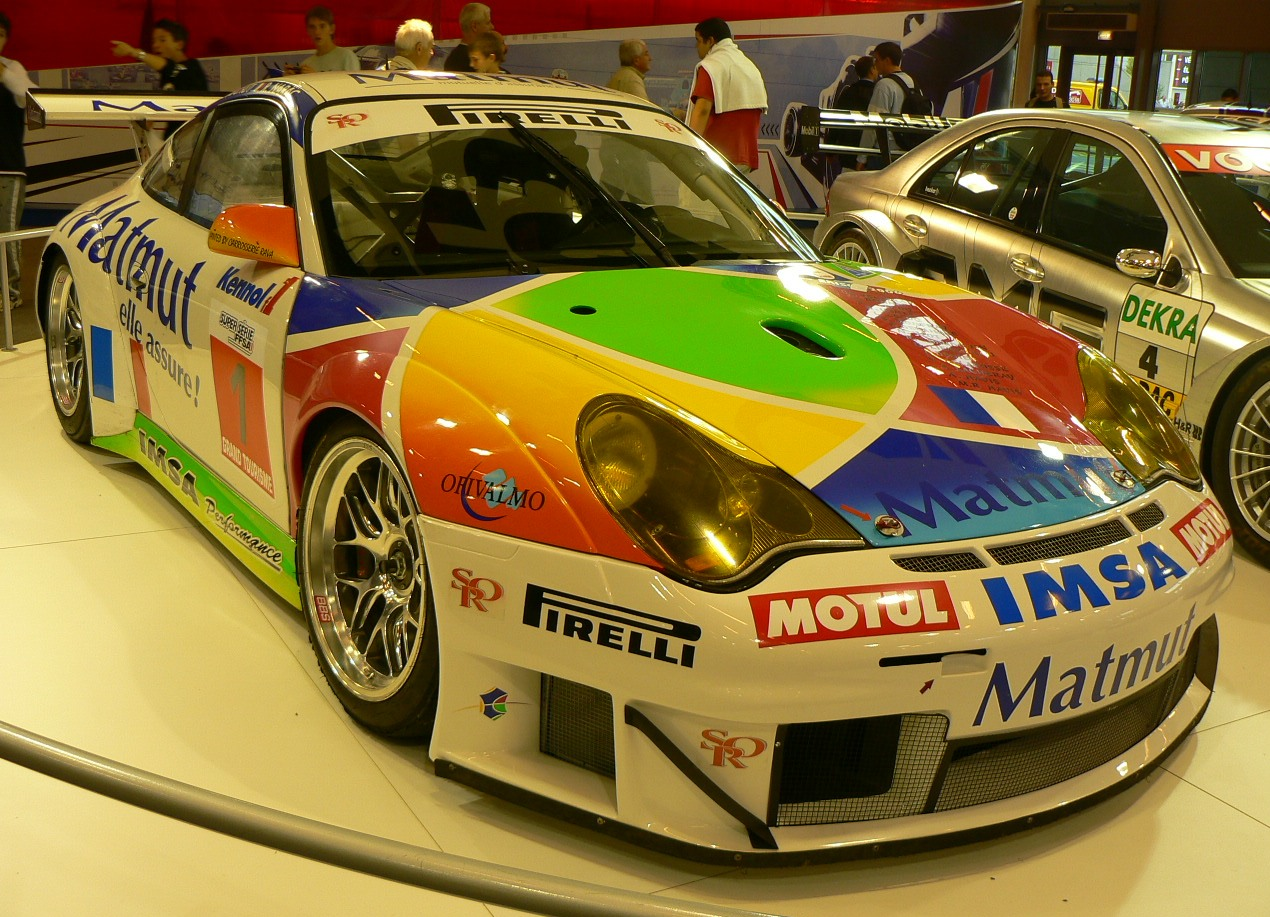
IMSA Performance Porsche 996 GT3-RSR being displayed at the 2006 Paris Motor Show.

After an impressive début in the FFSA GT Championship, IMSA Performance decided to enter one car into the GT2 class while the other two cars remained in Cup1. The team purchased a GT2-spec Porsche 996 GT3-RSR with Narac being joined by Sébastien Dumez for the season. The duo won twelve of the sixteen races and won the first of four drivers and teams championships.

The team were also successful in the French Porsche Carrera Cup finishing fifth overall in the standings and winning in the B class with Raymond Narac. 2005 also saw the teams début at the infamous 24 Hours of Le Mans. The FFSA duo of Narac and Dumez were joined by Porsche factory driver Romain Dumas for the 2005 edition using the same Porsche used in FFSA. The car finished in a respectable fourth place in the GT2 class and fifteenth overall.

The team expanded once again in 2006 by entering into the Le Mans Series. Narac entered a 996 along with veteran Christophe Bouchut in the 2006 season finishing fifth in the standings. Narac and IMSA continued to dominate in the GT2 class in FFSA GT alongside Michel Lecourt taking a second consecutive championship.

The team were looking forward to a GT2 victory at the 2006 24 Hours of Le Mans taking pole in the class, more than a second faster than second place starter Scuderia Ecosse. Unfortunately, an engine failure after 211 laps put an end to the teams hope of Le Mans victory. The trio of drivers were Narac, Dumas and Luca Riccitelli.

=== 2007 ===
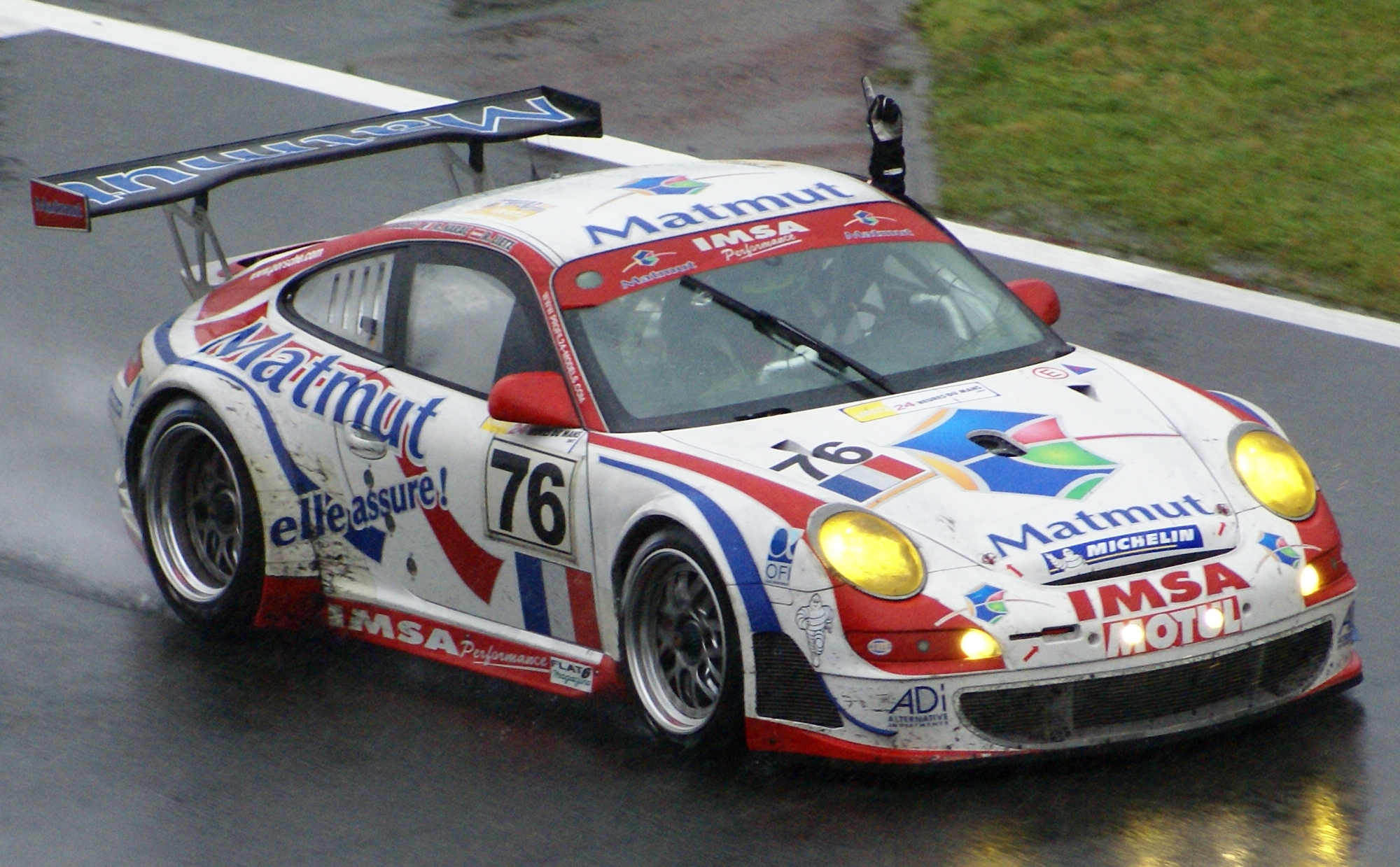
IMSA Performance Matmut Le Mans winning Porsche 997 GT3-RSR at the 2007 24 Hours of Le Mans

2007 is arguably the team's most successful year. Despite Narac racing for Oreca in the GT1 class in FFSA GT, the team still dominated the GT2 class thanks to the duo of Michel Lecourt and Richard Balandras using the new 997 GT3-RSR. Narac raced with the team in the 2007 Le Mans Series season and at Le Mans. The team didn't do particularly well in LMS, finishing seventh in both drivers' and teams' championships. Narac raced alongside Richard Lietz for the season.

Narac and Lietz were joined by Patrick Long for Le Mans and qualified second behind the Ferrari F430 of Scuderia Ecosse. The battle between Ferrari and Porsche was intense within the GT2 class but it was inevitably won by the IMSA Performance team. Finishing fifteenth overall despite a heavy downpour towards the end of the race, the car finished six laps ahead of the nearest GT2 competitor, the Ferrari of Risi Competizione/Krohn Racing. The trio also raced at that year's Spa 24 Hours, a month after Le Mans. The team finished second in the GT2 class, four laps behind fellow Porsche competitors BMS Scuderia Italia.

Along with FFSA and Le Mans success, the team won the Teams' Championship in the Porsche Carrera Cup France.

=== 2008 ===
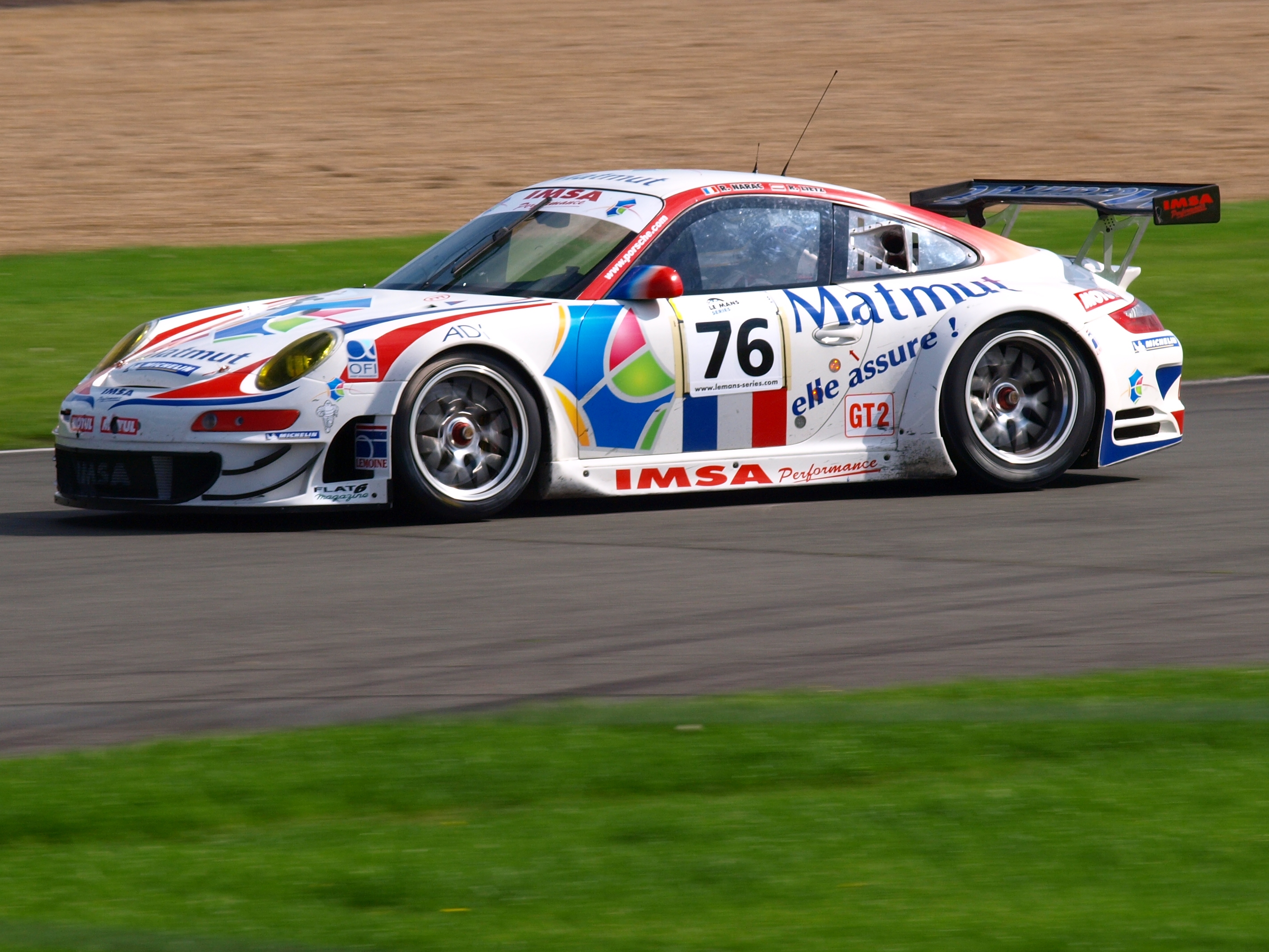
IMSA Performance Matmut Porsche 997 GT3-RSR at the 2008 1000 km of Silverstone.

The team were looking for yet more success after a brilliant 2007 season. They took a fourth consecutive GT2 teams and drivers championship in FFSA GT with Narac winning the drivers title. The team once again performed poorly in Le Mans Series despite entering two cars. The highest placed car, No. 76, finished fifth in the drivers and teams championship.

Le Mans was a different story as the IMSA Porsche 911 took GT2 pole for the second time in four entries, qualifying just under a second ahead of rival Porsche competitors Team Felbermayr-Proton. Narac, Lietz and Patrick Long were the three drivers at Le Mans in 2008. The race came to an early end on the 26th lap after Long had a collision with the rival No. 80 Flying Lizard Motorsports Porsche driven by Seth Neiman. The Le Mans trio also ran in the Spa 24 Hours but only managed seventh in class. The team did relatively well in the French Carrera Cup finishing third with Renaud Derlot.

=== 2009 ===
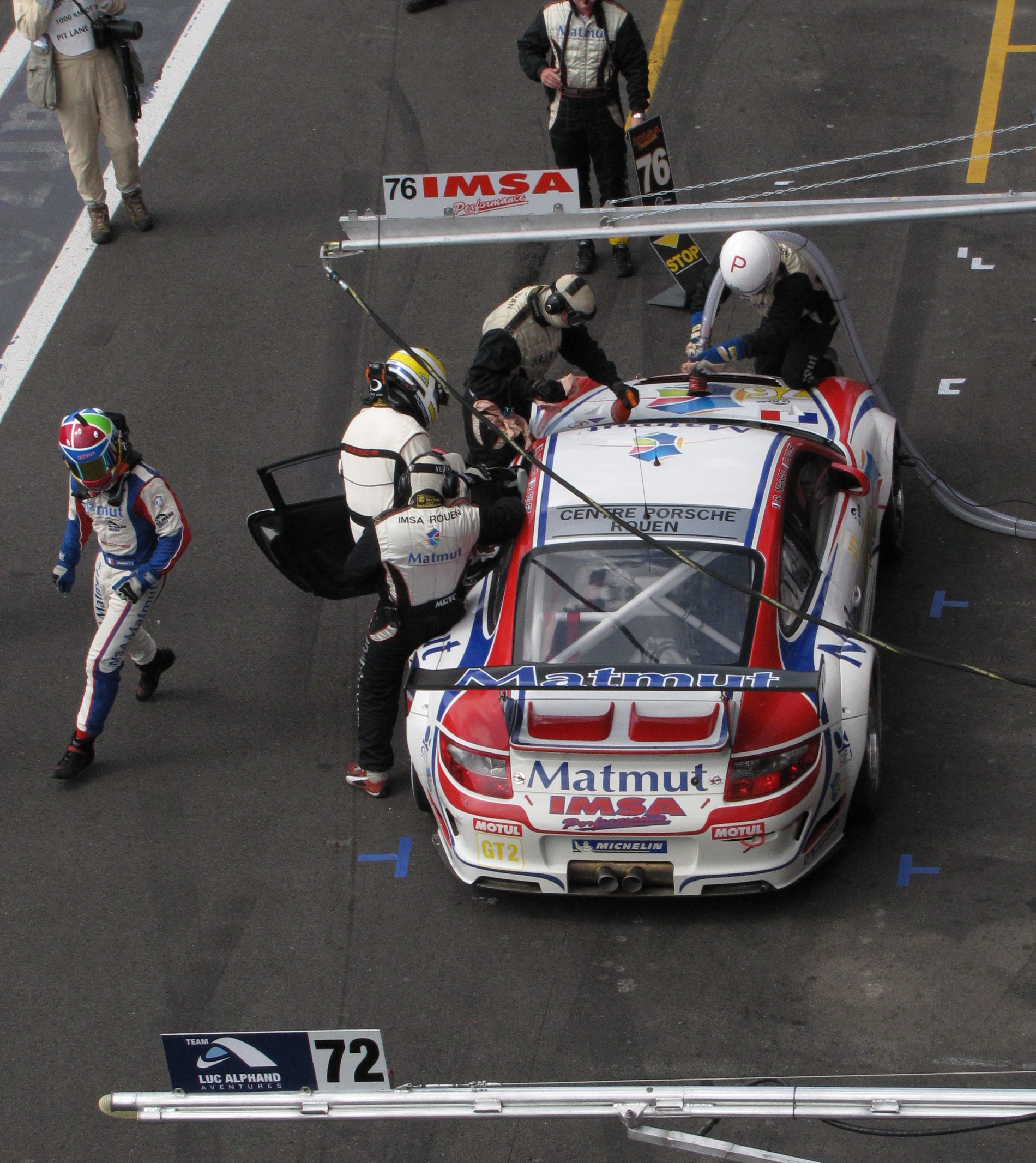
IMSA Performance Matmut Porsche 997 GT3-RSR during a pit stop at the 2009 1000 km of Spa.

2009 saw the team race in the International GT Open series with three 997 GT3-RSR's in the "Super GT" class. The No. 16 car driven by Narac and Patrick Pilet was by far the most successful car of the three winning six races and helping the team to second place in the teams championship behind Autorlando Sport. Narac and Pilet finished third in the drivers championship. Narac and Pilet also competed together in the 2009 Le Mans Series season but only managed sixth in drivers and teams championships.

The team continued on with their Le Mans and Spa 24 Hours' programmes. The team entered two cars for the Le Mans race, car No. 76 driven by Narac, Pilet and Patrick Long while the No. 70 car was shared with Team Felbermayr-Proton featuring Horst Felbermayr Sr. and Junior joined by IMSA driver Michel Lecourt. The No. 70 car did not last long retiring with an engine failure completing just 102 laps. Car 76 retired with just three hours left with a gearbox problem. The team entered the Spa 24 Hours with just one car with the same line up as car No. 76 at Le Mans. Strangely, the team was forced to retire the car with three hours to go, like at Le Mans although this time it was due to an engine failure.

=== 2010 ===
2010 got off to a great start with the team winning the Dubai 24 Hour in January 2010. The trio of Narac, Pilet and German Marco Holzer won the race overall finishing three laps ahead of the second place car and five laps ahead of its nearest "A6" class rival. The team raced just one car in the 2010 International GT Open season rather than three with the partnership of Narac and Pilet picking up four wins in the Super GT class and finishing fourth in the drivers and teams standings. Le Mans Series was once again average, finishing fifth in the standings although they did win the Michelin GreenX Challenge for having the most fuel-efficient GT class car. They were not given an automatic invitation to Le Mans for 2011 however as they were not the overall winner.

The familiar 24 Hours trio of Narac, Pilet and Long were once again reunited behind car No. 76 for the 2010 24 Hours of Le Mans. Qualifying fifth in the GT2 class, the car remained in fifth after 24 hours of racing. The trio were joined by Richard Lietz behind car No. 16 for the 24 Hours of Spa which also saw the team enter another car, No. 17 driven by Jean-Philippe Belloc, Richard Balandras, Christophe Bourret and Pascal Gibon. Following the break-up of the FIA GT Championship, GT1-spec cars were not allowed race at the event so GT2 became the top class. The IMSA Performance car finished second overall, despite the dominance of the "GTN" class BMW M3 GT2's of BMW Motorsport, and in class behind the winning Porsche of BMS Scuderia Italia. Car No. 17 finished sixth in class and helped the team win the teams championship in the short-lived FIA GT2 European Cup.

=== 2011 ===
2011 was a somewhat quiet year for IMSA Performance. They took a break from International GT Open and did not return to the 24 Hours of Spa. 2011 also saw the demise of the GT1 class from Le Mans and two new GT classes were formed around GT2-spec cars; LMGTE-Pro for professional drivers rated platinum and/or silver, and LMGTE-Am for gentleman (silver and/or bronze) rated drivers with only one "professional" (gold or platinum) driver allowed. GTE-Am competitors were only allowed use cars of 2010 spec and lower while GTE-Pro entrants could use 2011-spec cars. IMSA Performance Matmut ran two cars for the season, one in each class. In LMS, the No. 76 GTE-Pro class car was driven by Patrick Pilet and Wolf Henzler while the No. 67 GTE-Am car was driven by Raymond Narac and Nicolas Armindo. While the Pro car only managed fifth in the championship, Narac and Armindo dominated the GTE-Am category winning four of the five events winning the drivers and teams championships by seventeen points.

The team entered just one car at Le Mans which was the GTE-Pro No. 76 car. Narac, Pilet and Armindo were the drivers. A poor qualifying saw the car start third last in the LMGTE-Pro class, only qualifying ahead of the two slow and unreliable Lotus Evora's. The race went much better finishing fifth in class between rival Porsche teams Team Felbermayr-Proton and Flying Lizard Motorsports.

=== 2012 ===
The team returned to International GT Open with Narac and Pilet currently second place in the drivers championships as of round two. They are competing in the newly renamed European Le Mans Series with one car in LMGTE-Am. Narac and Armindo are joined by Anthony Pons for the season and are currently second in the championship.

The trio also raced together at Le Mans which saw the car lead in the LMGTE-Am class until veteran and former Peugeot Sport driver Pedro Lamy in the No. 50 Larbre Compétition Corvette C6.R overtook the No. 67 IMSA Performance Matmut Porsche driven by the inexperienced Anthony Pons with under an hour left. Moments later the Porsche picked up a puncture but still managed to finish second in the LMGTE-Am class, a lap behind the winning Larbre Corvette.

=== 2013 ===
In 2013, IMSA took the GTE-Am class win at the 2013 24 Hours of Le Mans. This time Raymond Narac was joined by Cristophe Bourret and Porsche factory driver Jean-Karl Vernay.

== Racing record ==
=== 24 Hours of Le Mans results ===
Year	Entrant	No.	Car	Drivers	Class	Laps	Pos.	Class Pos.
2005	(France) IMSA Performance	76	Porsche 911 GT3-RSR	(France) Romain Dumas (France) Sébastien Dumez (France) Raymond Narac	LMGT2	322	15th	4th
2006	(France) IMSA Performance Matmut	76	Porsche 911 GT3-RSR	(France) Romain Dumas (France) Raymond Narac (Italy) Luca Riccitelli	LMGT2	211	DNF	DNF
2007	(France) IMSA Performance Matmut	76	Porsche 997 GT3-RSR	(Austria) Richard Lietz (United States) Patrick Long (France) Raymond Narac	LMGT2	320	15th	1st
2008	(France) IMSA Performance Matmut	76	Porsche 997 GT3-RSR	(Austria) Richard Lietz (United States) Patrick Long (France) Raymond Narac	LMGT2	26	DNF	DNF
2009	(France) IMSA Performance Matmut (Germany) Team Felbermayr-Proton	70	Porsche 997 GT3-RSR	(Austria) Horst Felbermayr (Austria) Horst Felbermayr Jr. (France) Michel Lecourt	LMGT2	102	DNF	DNF
2009	(France) IMSA Performance Matmut	76	Porsche 997 GT3-RSR	(United States) Patrick Long (France) Raymond Narac (France) Patrick Pilet	LMGT2	265	DNF	DNF
2010	(France) IMSA Performance Matmut	76	Porsche 997 GT3-RSR	(United States) Patrick Long (France) Raymond Narac (France) Patrick Pilet	LMGT2	321	17th	5th
2011	(France) IMSA Performance Matmut	76	Porsche 997 GT3-RSR	(France) Nicolas Armindo (France) Raymond Narac (France) Patrick Pilet	LMGTE Pro	311	17th	5th
2011	(France) Larbre Compétition	70	Porsche 997 GT3-RSR	(France) Jean-Philippe Belloc (France) Christophe Bourret (France) Pascal Gibon	LMGTE Am	301	21st	2nd
2012	(France) IMSA Performance Matmut	67	Porsche 997 GT3-RSR	(France) Nicolas Armindo (France) Raymond Narac (France) Anthony Pons	LMGTE Am	328	21st	2nd
2013	(France) IMSA Performance Matmut	67	Porsche 997 GT3-RSR	(France) Pascal Gibon (Germany) Wolf Henzler (France) Patrice Milesi	LMGTE Am	300	33rd	7th
2013	(France) IMSA Performance Matmut	76	Porsche 997 GT3-RSR	(France) Christophe Bourret (France) Raymond Narac (France) Jean-Karl Vernay	LMGTE Am	306	25th	1st
2014	(France) IMSA Performance Matmut	67	Porsche 997 GT3-RSR	(France) Éric Hélary (France) Erik Maris (France) Jean-Marc Merlin	LMGTE Am	317	34th	13th
2014	(France) IMSA Performance Matmut	76	Porsche 997 GT3-RSR	(France) Nicolas Armindo (France) David Hallyday (France) Raymond Narac	LMGTE Am	323	31st	11th
