= 2009 1000 km of Spa =

The Circuit de Spa-Francorchamps

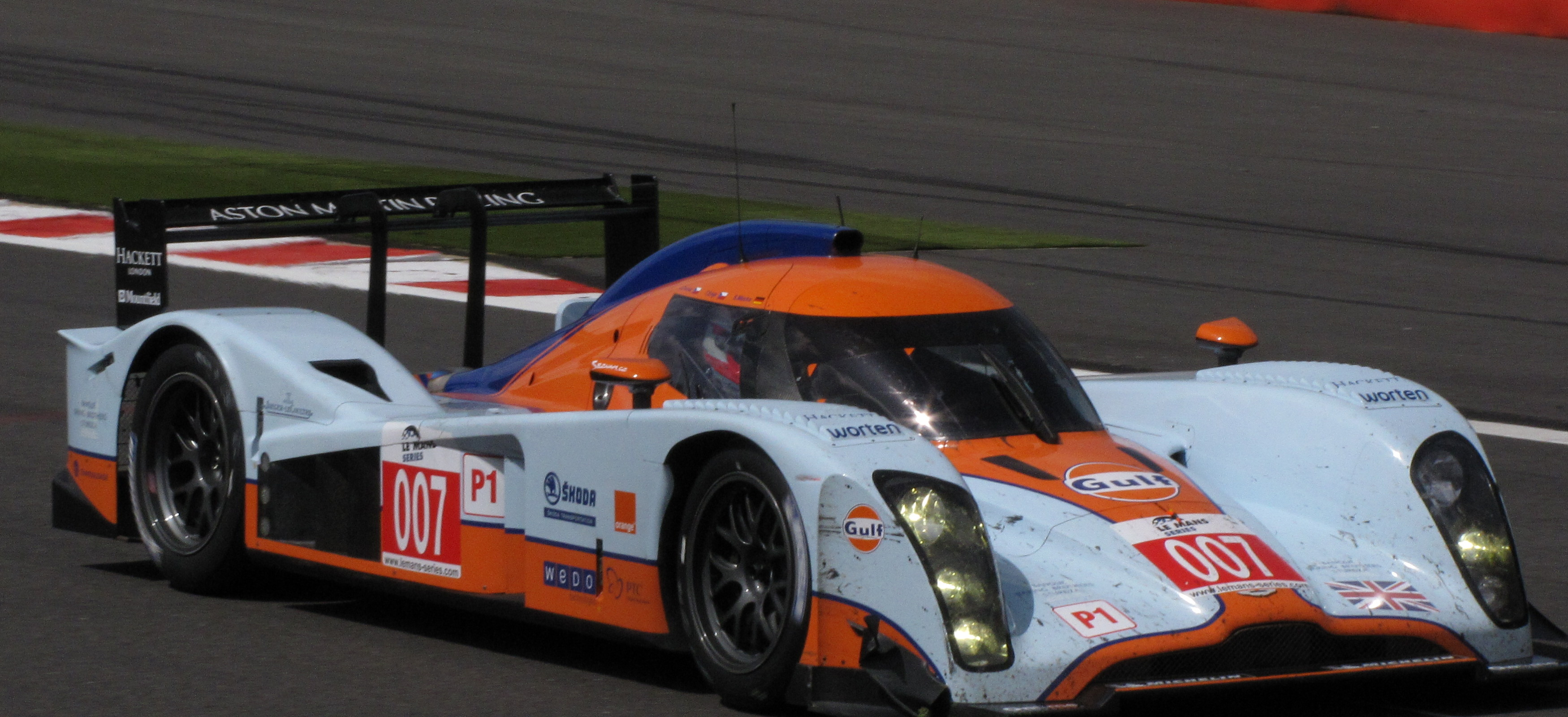
The #007 Lola-Aston Martin B09/60 which finished in third place

The 2009 1000 km of Spa was the second round of the 2009 Le Mans Series season. It occurred at the Circuit de Spa-Francorchamps, Belgium, on May 10, 2009. Several teams tested at Spa before the 24 Hours of Le Mans, including eventual winners Team Peugeot and Team Essex Porsche, as well as the Jetalliance Racing Aston Martin. This is the 28th European Le Mans Series race since 2004.

The Peugeot 908 HDi FAP No. 7, driven by Nicolas Minassian, Simon Pagenaud, and Christian Klien, won the event less than thirty seconds ahead of their pursuer, the Pescarolo 01 No. 16, driven by Jean-Christophe Bouillon and Christophe Tinseau. In the LMP2 class, Xavier Pompidou in the Speedy Racing Team Sebah's Lola B08/80 No. 33 did not manage to catch up to Team Essex's Porsche RS Spyder Evo at the end of the race. The latter, driven by Casper Elgaard, Kristian Poulsen, and Emmanuel Collard, won by seven-tenths of a second.

In GT1, only three crews take the start. The French team Luc Alphand Adventures, the defending champion, prevailed again with its Chevrolet Corvette C6.R driven by Luc Alphand, Patrice Goueslard, and Yann Clairay. Lastly, in GT2, Team Felbermayr Proton's Porsche 911 GT3 RSR (997), driven by Marc Lieb, Richard Lietz, and Horst Felbermayr Sr. was initially disqualified then reclassified as the winner, ahead of Team Modena's Ferrari F430 GTC driven by Antonio García, Leo Mansell, and Jaime Melo.

== Race Background ==
=== Championship position ===
Aston Martin Racing, winner of the 1000 km of Catalunya with No. 007, led the LMP1 championship with 10 points, two more than the Pescarolo No. 16. In the LMP2 category, Racing Box's Lola No. 30 was in the lead ahead of Quifel ASM Team's Zytek. In GT1, IPB Spartak Racing (Lamborghini Murciélago R-GT) led the way ahead of Luc Alphand Adventures (Chevrolet Corvette C6.R). Finally, the GT2 category was led by Team Felbermayr Proton's Porsche 997 GT3 RSR No. 77, ahead of JMW Motorsport's Ferrari F430 GTC.

=== Oreca 01 and Lamborghini Gallardo LP560 GT2's first race ===
On May 6, Oreca presented its new design, the 01. Similar to the previous year, the emblem is inspired by the works of the Dutch painter Piet Mondrian. The Oreca 01 would also have a new aerodynamic kit. For team manager Hugues de Chaunac, the Spa event was another opportunity to train before the 24 Hours of Le Mans: "Spa is a crucial step. It's a semi-final before Le Mans. This test will show us if we're well positioned before this year's race. We'll know where we are compared to the competition. We want to make a successful debut with the Oreca 01. We're going to set ourselves straight." French driver Nicolas Lapierre did not hide his ambitions: "A good result would give us a boost before the 24 Hours. It's important not to make mistakes and to have a perfect weekend. This new car has a bigger, more unmitigated performance potential and a wider turning range. We have taken a big step forward and have to prove it with an excellent performance. We want to be on the podium. With Oliver, we are committed to living down the disappointment in Barcelona. All the elements are there to shine!"

The Lamborghini Gallardo LP560 GT2, developed and operated by Reiter Engineering, took part in its first race at the 1,000 km of Spa. At the end of March, the team tested the car at Salzburging, driven by Peter Kox and Roman Rusinov, both dealing with snowy weather. The German team then went to the Paul-Ricard Circuit as part of the FIA GT Championship Test Days. Christophe Bouchut and Albert von Thurn und Taxis drove the car this time. Hans Reiter, team manager, believed the vehicle should have been reliable enough for the Spa race: "It's not unrealistic to think that the car will last 1,000 kilometers in the race if we continue practicing. That's why we will step up the testing before starting the Gallardo in the 1,000 kilometers of Spa."

=== Peugeot's limited entry in the Le Mans Series ===
At the beginning of February, Peugeot announced its sports program, which included, in addition to the 24 Hours of Le Mans, only the 1,000 kilometers of Spa and the 12 Hours of Sebring; however, without definitively closing the door to another entry into the Le Mans Series. The program's evolution would depend on the 24 Hours of Le Mans result.

While three builds were to be entered in the Spa race, only two took part. According to Oliver Quesnel, the entry of a third car would require additional human effort, hampering their preparation for the 24 Hours of Le Mans: "It is not a question of a delay in the preparation of our work but of an adjustment in our organization. Our priority remains with Le Mans. I don't want the team to exhaust itself by preparing three cars for the Spa race, especially as our program's endurance simulation tests continue. Therefore, we chose six drivers, selected according to their respective mileage behind the wheel of the 908 HDi FAP."

During a press conference, Peugeot Sport and Oliver Quesnel assured that they would be present at Portimão and hoped for a commitment to the Petit Le Mans at the end of the year: "We'll certainly be in Portimão with two cars, and we hope to be able to get into the Petit Le Mans as well." The French manufacturer's 2009 program was previously limited to just three rounds.

=== Development of the cars ===
Peugeot Sport made no aerodynamic changes to its 908 HDi FAP. The two French prototypes drove in the same configuration as at the 12 Hours of Sebring, except for the addition of a thirty-kilogram ballast imposed by the new regulations.

The Spyker Squadron team took advantage of the Spa race to change its C8 Laviolette GT2-R. A new spoiler and air box were added to improve the engine torque. Czech driver Jaroslav Janiš, absent from the 1,000 km of Catalunya, was also absent from the 1,000 km of Spa due to jaw inflammation. His doctors advised him not to participate in the race. Drivers Tom Coronel and Peter Dumbreck had to do without him while driving the Spyker.

For Pescarolo Sport, car No. 16 had already received its new aerodynamic kit during the inaugural Catalan race. At Spa, the second car had also received one. In the LMP2 category, OAK Racing, which entered two Pescarolo 01s, had also modified the aerodynamics of one of its cars (No. 35). Such a modification is estimated at €200,000. In addition to this development, Mazda North America oversaw the team from then on.

As for the manufacturing company Michelin, they brought tires with a new type of rubber (slick and rain) for the entire LMP1 group. In LMP2, competitors were also entitled to new slick tires with medium compound. For Matthieu Bonardel, competition manager at Michelin, the objective was to offer a tire that could heat up more quickly while having a longer service life than that of their 2008 model: "We didn't want to use harder rubber, yet we wanted to keep our 2008 performance level. So, we had to review the tire's structure in depth because keeping it at more than 100 °C any longer damages its structure. That's why we've reinforced the materials of which it's composed. Regarding regulations, the constraint of the aero load had not necessarily changed because the reduction in the size of the rear wing has been added to the additional ballast of 30 kg."

=== Teams and drivers involved, final preparations ===
Team Modena's Ferrari F430 GTC had to be repaired at the Michelotto plant in Italy after a violent nighttime accident during a testing session on the Algarve Circuit. Despite riding off the track, driver Leo Mansell was unharmed. The team manager, Graham Schultz, spoke about the tests and the car, which had not yet been fully addressed. “Our tests with the Ferrari on Portugal’s new Algarve Circuit were very productive. We’re still in the learning stage with the Ferrari, and we’ve been able to make some improvements. We had the opportunity to test at night, but Leo went off the track in the dark, and the car was badly damaged at the rear.” The car arrived at the circuit's paddock on Thursday night, allowing free practice to begin on schedule. In the LMP2 category, Speedy Racing Team Sebah suffered a similar misfortune during pre-season testing at the Bugatti circuit at the end of April. The Lola B08/80 No. 33 ran off the track at the entrance to the Dunlop Bridge. Although the monocoque was damaged, the team and Lola managed to get the car ready in time for the Spa round.

A few days before the start of the event, the entry list showed several changes. Narain Karthikeyan was appointed to drive ByKolles Racing’s Audi R10 TDI No. 14, which he had then just discovered. He was partnered with Andy Meyrick and Charles Zwolsman. Michael Krumm, who was initially entered, did not drive for the Austrian team. On board No. 14, the crew of Christijan Albers and Christian Bakkerud was reinforced by the arrival of Giorgio Mondini. Lucas di Grassi and Nicolas Kiesa, who were present on the first entry list, were also omitted. In the LMP2 category, Máximo Cortés drove for the second time in a row with Pierre Combot for the Q8 Oils Hache Team. The British Team LNT, present at Silverstone in 2008, returned for the Spa round.

Already low on entries after the first entry list was published, the GT1 category was affected by two withdrawals. Both Saleen S7-R from Larbre Compétition and ARC Bratislava withdrew. The latter was to be piloted by two Belgian drivers. The unregistered Jetalliance Racing was present at Spa with its Aston Martin DBR9 to train and prepare for the 24 Hours of Le Mans. The GT1 category also saw IPB Spartak Racing lose its main partner. Russian driver Roman Rusinov was sidelined, replaced by Filip Salaquarda and Erik Janiš. On the other hand, the GT2 category saw the arrival of an additional competitor, the Prospeed Competition’s Porsche 997 GT3 RSR, driven by Paul Daniels and Markus Palttala. For Team Modena, Jaime Melo assisted Antonio García and Leo Mansell. At Hankook Team Farnacher, Pierre Kaffer and Allan Simonsen rode together. As for JMB Racing, Manuel Rodrigues and John Hartshorne were to drive the Ferrari together, but Bulgaria’s Plamen Kralev joined them.

== Free practice ==
=== First session, Friday, 4:30 to 6 p.m. ===
==== Times set by the top three finishers in each category of the first free practice session (pole position winners in bold) ====
Position	Category	No.	Team	Time	Laps
**1**	**LMP1**	**9**	**Team Peugeot Total**	**2:06.740 (on 4th lap)**	**27**
2	LMP1	11	Oreca	2:06.740 (on 3rd lap)	19
3	LMP1	10	Oreca	2:06.846 (on 4th lap)	10
**9**	**LMP2**	**25**	**RML**	**2:11.920 (on 16th lap)**	**16**
13	LMP2	32	Team Barazi Epsilon	2:13.644 (on 4th lap)	23
14	LMP2	40	Quifel ASM Team	2:13.912 (on 22nd lap)	22
**19**	**GT1**	**55**	**IPB Spartak Racing**	**2:19.722 (on 5th lap)**	**21**
25	GT1	72	Luc Alphand Adventures	2:22.658 (on 3rd lap)	19
43	GT1	66	Jetalliance Racing	2:34.144 (on 6th lap)	21
**27**	**GT2**	**91**	**FBR**	**2:24.488 (on 5th lap)**	**19**
29	GT2	89	Hankook Team Farnbacher	2:25.584 (on 4th lap)	24
30	GT2	92	JMW Motorsport	2:26.530 (on 5th lap)	21

Under cloudy skies, fifty-one cars had taken to the track. After a few minutes, a light rain had begun to fall over the circuit. As a result, many competitors set their fastest times early in the session. Among them was the #11 Oreca 01, driven by Nicholas Lapierre, which surprisingly had been matched down to the thousandth of a second on the following lap by the #9 Peugeot 908 HDi FAP, piloted by Marc Gené, with a time of 2:06.740. The second Oreca had secured third place, trailing by just 106 thousandths of a second. The #16 Pescarolo 01 also remained competitive, finishing within the exact second with a lap time of 2:06.930. In fourth place, the #7 Peugeot had managed a time of 2:07.658. Strakka Racing had placed sixth, while the leading Lola-Aston Martin B09/60, driven by Harold Primat, Miguel Ramos, and Darren Turner, had taken seventh position. Significant gaps had begun to emerge from eighth place onwards, with the #17 Pescarolo trailing by three seconds from the fastest time. The #13 Lola B08/60, the Courage-Oreca LC70E from Signature, and the #007 Lola-Aston Martin had all been relegated to nearly six seconds behind the leaders. The session had experienced its first red-flag delay when Darren Turner had lost a wheel during his lap. The rain had gradually dissipated about fifteen minutes before the end of the time trial.

In the LMP2 category, the session had been entirely dominated by the Lola B08/80 driven by Thomas Erdos and Mike Newton. The duo had also secured 25th place in the overall standings. Team Barazi-Epsilon’s Zytek 07S/2 finished second, more than 1.5 seconds behind. Quifel ASM Team's Ginetta-Zytek and Racing Box's first Lola (#30) had taken third and fourth places respectively (2:14.748). Team Essex's Porsche RS Spyder Evo had been delayed by a collision with Jacques Nicolet’s Pescarolo, necessitating a front hood change. Consequently, it had only achieved the eighth-fastest time (2:20.180). Speedy Racing Team Sebah's Lola had been hampered by a recalcitrant gearbox and had finished 15th with a time of 2:34, trailing the leader by 22 seconds. The session was also interrupted by a second red-flag delay when José Ibañez, driving the #28 Courage LC75, had gone off the track.

In GT1, the Lamborghini Murciélago R-GT achieved the fastest time, outpacing the Chevrolet Corvette C6.R, which ended the session by being slowly towed back to the pits. The Aston Martin DBR9 had been relegated to fifteen seconds behind the Lamborghini. In GT2, the Ferrari F430 GTCs had dominated, occupying the top six standings. Farnbacher Racing had secured a one-two finish with cars #91 and #89. The defending champions, Gianmaria Bruni and Robert Bell, had taken third place (2:26.530). The Ferrari from Team Modena, which had crashed during private testing on the Algarve Circuit, had finished fourth (2:26.716). Ferrari #90 and #96 had placed fifth (2:27.080) and sixth (2:27.098) respectively. In seventh place, the Spyker C8 Laviolette GT2-R had outperformed the top Porsche (2:28.816). The Porsche (IMSA Performance) had finished eighth, in 2:29.132. Meanwhile, absent in Catalonia, the Lamborghini Gallardo LP560 GT2 had recorded the slowest time in the category, trailing by twenty seconds.

== Report ==
=== Qualifying ===
The qualifying sessions for both the GT and Prototype categories were marked by several red flag periods which halted the sessions. These were caused by several accidents and car failures on circuit, which left five cars unable to complete a flying lap time. Peugeot was able to lock out the first row by margin of over a second from the leading Aston Martin, while the returning Team Essex Porsche RS Spyder secured pole position in LMP2. Jetalliance Racing gave Aston Martin a pole in GT1 and championship leaders Team Felbermayr-Proton led GT2.

==== Qualifying result ====
Pole position winners in each class are marked in bold.

Pos	Class	Team	Lap Time
1	**LMP1**	**No. 7 Team Peugeot Total**	**2:01.056**
2	LMP1	No. 9 Team Peugeot Total	2:01.082
3	LMP1	No. 009 Aston Martin Racing	2:02.488
4	LMP1	No. 10 Team Oreca Matmut AIM	2:02.570
5	LMP1	No. 16 Pescarolo Sport	2:02.674
6	LMP1	No. 13 Speedy Racing Team Sebah	2:03.022
7	LMP1	No. 22 Team LNT	2:03.598
8	LMP1	No. 17 Pescarolo Sport	2:04.390
9	LMP1	No. 14 Kolles	2:04.478
10	LMP1	No. 12 Signature Plus	2:04.614
11	LMP1	No. 15 Kolles	2:04.630
12	**LMP2**	**No. 31 Team Essex**	**2:07.918**
13	LMP2	No. 33 Speedy Racing Team Sebah	2:08.446
14	LMP2	No. 30 Racing Box	2:08.600
15	LMP2	No. 40 Quifel ASM Team	2:08.850
16	LMP2	No. 41 GAC Racing Team	2:09.326
17	LMP2	No. 32 Team Barazi-Epsilon	2:09.662
18	LMP2	No. 35 OAK Racing Team	2:11.244
19	LMP2	No. 37 WR Salini	2:11.874
20	LMP1	No. 3 Scuderia Lavaggi	2:12.506
21	LMP2	No. 39 KrSM	2:12.876
22	LMP2	No. 43 Q8 Oils Hache Team	2:14.256
23	LMP2	No. 38 Pegasus Racing	2:17.026
24	**GT1**	**No. 66 Jetalliance Racing**	**2:17.344**
25	LMP2	No. 24 OAK Racing	2:17.834
26	GT1	No. 55 IPB Spartak Racing	2:18.242
27	LMP2	No. 28 Ibañez Racing Service	2:19.258
28	GT1	No. 72 Luc Alphand Aventures	2:19.680
29	LMP1	No. 11 Team Oreca Matmut AIM	2:21.146
30	**GT2**	**No. 77 Team Felbermayr-Proton**	**2:21.870**
31	GT2	No. 76 IMSA Performance Matmut	2:22.012
32	GT2	No. 84 Team Modena	2:22.698
33	LMP2	No. 29 Racing Box	2:22.858
34	LMP2	No. 42 Ranieri Randaccio	2:23.044
35	GT2	No. 92 JMW Motorsport	2:23.148
36	GT2	No. 89 Hankook Team Farnbacher	2:23.232
37	GT2	No. 91 FBR	2:23.656
38	GT2	No. 87 Drayson Racing	2:23.694
39	GT2	No. 90 FBR	2:23.758
40	GT2	No. 85 Snoras Spyker Squadron	2:25.088
41	GT2	No. 94 Prospeed Competition	2:26.260
42	GT2	No. 78 Advanced Engineering	2:26.448
43	GT2	No. 96 Virgo Motorsport	2:26.892
44	GT2	No. 81 Easyrace	2:27.024
45	GT2	No. 88 Team Felbermayr-Proton	2:27.672
46	GT2	No. 99 JMB Racing	2:27.926
47	LMP2	No. 26 Bruichladdich-Bruneau Team	3:37.296
48	LMP1	No. 23 Strakka Racing	3:55.058
49	LMP1	No. 007 Aston Martin Racing	No Time
-	LMP2	No. 25 RML	No Time
-	GT2	No. 79 Reiter Engineering	No Time

=== Race ===
==== Race results ====
Class winners in bold. Cars failing to complete 70% of winner's distance marked as Not Classified (NC).

Pos	Class	No	Team	Drivers	Chassis	Tyre	Laps
Pos	Class	No	Team	Drivers	Engine	Tyre	Laps
1	**LMP1**	**7**	**(France) Team Peugeot Total**	**(France) Nicolas Minassian (France) Simon Pagenaud (Austria) Christian Klien**	**Peugeot 908 HDi FAP**	M	**143**
1	**LMP1**	**7**	**(France) Team Peugeot Total**	**(France) Nicolas Minassian (France) Simon Pagenaud (Austria) Christian Klien**	**Peugeot HDi 5.5 L Turbo V12 (Diesel)**	M	**143**
2	LMP1	16	(France) Pescarolo Sport	(France) Jean-Christophe Boullion (France) Christophe Tinseau	Pescarolo 01	M	143
2	LMP1	16	(France) Pescarolo Sport	(France) Jean-Christophe Boullion (France) Christophe Tinseau	Judd GV5.5 S2 5.5 L V10	M	143
3	LMP1	007	(United Kingdom) Aston Martin Racing	(Czech Republic) Jan Charouz (Czech Republic) Tomáš Enge (Germany) Stefan Mücke	Lola-Aston Martin B09/60	M	142
3	LMP1	007	(United Kingdom) Aston Martin Racing	(Czech Republic) Jan Charouz (Czech Republic) Tomáš Enge (Germany) Stefan Mücke	Aston Martin AM04 6.0 L V12	M	142
4	LMP1	11	(France) Team Oreca Matmut AIM	(France) Olivier Panis (France) Nicolas Lapierre	Oreca 01	M	142
4	LMP1	11	(France) Team Oreca Matmut AIM	(France) Olivier Panis (France) Nicolas Lapierre	AIM YS5.5 5.5 L V10	M	142
5	LMP1	009	(United Kingdom) Aston Martin Racing	(United Kingdom) Darren Turner (Switzerland) Harold Primat (Portugal) Miguel Ramos	Lola-Aston Martin B09/60	M	142
5	LMP1	009	(United Kingdom) Aston Martin Racing	(United Kingdom) Darren Turner (Switzerland) Harold Primat (Portugal) Miguel Ramos	Aston Martin AM04 6.0 L V12	M	142
6	LMP1	14	(Germany) Kolles	(India) Narain Karthikeyan (United Kingdom) Andy Meyrick (Netherlands) Charles Zwolsman Jr.	Audi R10 TDI	M	141
6	LMP1	14	(Germany) Kolles	(India) Narain Karthikeyan (United Kingdom) Andy Meyrick (Netherlands) Charles Zwolsman Jr.	Audi TDI 5.5 L Turbo V12 (Diesel)	M	141
7	LMP1	15	(Germany) Kolles	(Netherlands) Christijan Albers (Denmark) Christian Bakkerud (Switzerland) Giorgio Mondini	Audi R10 TDI	M	139
7	LMP1	15	(Germany) Kolles	(Netherlands) Christijan Albers (Denmark) Christian Bakkerud (Switzerland) Giorgio Mondini	Audi TDI 5.5 L Turbo V12 (Diesel)	M	139
8	**LMP2**	**31**	**(Denmark) Team Essex**	**(Denmark) Casper Elgaard (Denmark) Kristian Poulsen (France) Emmanuel Collard**	**Porsche RS Spyder Evo**	M	**139**
8	**LMP2**	**31**	**(Denmark) Team Essex**	**(Denmark) Casper Elgaard (Denmark) Kristian Poulsen (France) Emmanuel Collard**	**Porsche MR6 3.4 L V8**	M	**139**
9	LMP2	33	(Switzerland) Speedy Racing Team (United Kingdom) Sebah Automotive	(Switzerland) Benjamin Leuenberger (France) Xavier Pompidou (United Kingdom) Jonny Kane	Lola B08/80	M	139
9	LMP2	33	(Switzerland) Speedy Racing Team (United Kingdom) Sebah Automotive	(Switzerland) Benjamin Leuenberger (France) Xavier Pompidou (United Kingdom) Jonny Kane	Judd DB 3.4 L V8	M	139
10	LMP1	13	(Switzerland) Speedy Racing Team (United Kingdom) Sebah Automotive	(Switzerland) Marcel Fässler (Italy) Andrea Belicchi (France) Nicolas Prost	Lola B08/60	M	139
10	LMP1	13	(Switzerland) Speedy Racing Team (United Kingdom) Sebah Automotive	(Switzerland) Marcel Fässler (Italy) Andrea Belicchi (France) Nicolas Prost	Aston Martin AM04 6.0 L V12	M	139
11	LMP1	12	(France) Signature Plus	(France) Pierre Ragues (France) Franck Mailleux	Courage-Oreca LC70E	M	138
11	LMP1	12	(France) Signature Plus	(France) Pierre Ragues (France) Franck Mailleux	Judd GV5.5 S2 5.5 L V10	M	138
12	LMP1	9	(France) Team Peugeot Total	(Australia) David Brabham (Spain) Marc Gené (Austria) Alexander Wurz	Peugeot 908 HDi FAP	M	136
12	LMP1	9	(France) Team Peugeot Total	(Australia) David Brabham (Spain) Marc Gené (Austria) Alexander Wurz	Peugeot HDi 5.5 L Turbo V12 (Diesel)	M	136
13	**GT1**	**72**	**(France) Luc Alphand Aventures**	**(France) Luc Alphand (France) Patrice Goueslard (France) Yann Clairay**	**Chevrolet Corvette C6.R**	D	**132**
13	**GT1**	**72**	**(France) Luc Alphand Aventures**	**(France) Luc Alphand (France) Patrice Goueslard (France) Yann Clairay**	**Chevrolet LS7.R 7.0 L V8**	D	**132**
14	LMP2	35	OAK Racing; Team Mazda France	(France) Matthieu Lahaye (Switzerland) Karim Ajlani	Pescarolo 01	D	132
14	LMP2	35	OAK Racing; Team Mazda France	(France) Matthieu Lahaye (Switzerland) Karim Ajlani	Mazda MZR-R 2.0 L Turbo I4	D	132
15	GT1	55	(Russia) IPB Spartak Racing	(Netherlands) Peter Kox (Czech Republic) Filip Salaquarda (Czech Republic) Erik Janiš	Lamborghini Murciélago R-GT	M	131
15	GT1	55	(Russia) IPB Spartak Racing	(Netherlands) Peter Kox (Czech Republic) Filip Salaquarda (Czech Republic) Erik Janiš	Lamborghini L535 6.0 L V12	M	131
16	LMP1	22	(United Kingdom) Team LNT	(United Kingdom) Lawrence Tomlinson (United Kingdom) Robbie Kerr (United Kingdom) Guy Smith	Ginetta-Zytek GZ09S	M	130
16	LMP1	22	(United Kingdom) Team LNT	(United Kingdom) Lawrence Tomlinson (United Kingdom) Robbie Kerr (United Kingdom) Guy Smith	Zytek ZJ458 4.5 L V8	M	130
17	LMP1	23	(United Kingdom) Strakka Racing	(United Kingdom) Nick Leventis (United Kingdom) Peter Hardman (United Kingdom) Danny Watts	Ginetta-Zytek GZ09S	M	129
17	LMP1	23	(United Kingdom) Strakka Racing	(United Kingdom) Nick Leventis (United Kingdom) Peter Hardman (United Kingdom) Danny Watts	Zytek ZJ458 4.5 L V8	M	129
18	**GT2**	**77**	**(Germany) Team Felbermayr-Proton**	**(Germany) Marc Lieb (Austria) Richard Lietz (Austria) Horst Felbermayr Sr.**	**Porsche 997 GT3-RSR**	M	**129**
18	**GT2**	**77**	**(Germany) Team Felbermayr-Proton**	**(Germany) Marc Lieb (Austria) Richard Lietz (Austria) Horst Felbermayr Sr.**	**Porsche M97/74 4.0 L Flat-6**	M	**129**
19	GT2	84	(United Kingdom) Team Modena	(Spain) Antonio García (United Kingdom) Leo Mansell (Brazil) Jaime Melo	Ferrari F430 GT2	M	129
19	GT2	84	(United Kingdom) Team Modena	(Spain) Antonio García (United Kingdom) Leo Mansell (Brazil) Jaime Melo	Ferrari F136 GT 4.0 L V8	M	129
20	GT2	92	(United Kingdom) JMW Motorsport	(United Kingdom) Rob Bell (Italy) Gianmaria Bruni	Ferrari F430 GT2	D	128
20	GT2	92	(United Kingdom) JMW Motorsport	(United Kingdom) Rob Bell (Italy) Gianmaria Bruni	Ferrari F136 GT 4.0 L V8	D	128
21	GT2	90	(Germany) FBR	(Germany) Pierre Ehret (Germany) Dominik Farnbacher	Ferrari F430 GT2	M	128
21	GT2	90	(Germany) FBR	(Germany) Pierre Ehret (Germany) Dominik Farnbacher	Ferrari F136 GT 4.0 L V8	M	128
22	GT2	85	(Netherlands) Snoras Spyker Squadron	(Netherlands) Tom Coronel (United Kingdom) Peter Dumbreck	Spyker C8 Laviolette GT2-R	M	128
22	GT2	85	(Netherlands) Snoras Spyker Squadron	(Netherlands) Tom Coronel (United Kingdom) Peter Dumbreck	Audi 4.0 L V8	M	128
23	GT2	76	(France) IMSA Performance Matmut	(France) Patrick Pilet (France) Raymond Narac	Porsche 997 GT3-RSR	M	127
23	GT2	76	(France) IMSA Performance Matmut	(France) Patrick Pilet (France) Raymond Narac	Porsche M97/74 4.0 L Flat-6	M	127
24	LMP2	38	(France) Pegasus Racing	(France) Julien Schell (France) Philippe Thirion	Courage-Oreca LC75	A	127
24	LMP2	38	(France) Pegasus Racing	(France) Julien Schell (France) Philippe Thirion	AER P07 2.0 L Turbo I4	A	127
25	GT2	87	(United Kingdom) Drayson Racing	(United Kingdom) Paul Drayson (United Kingdom) Jonny Cocker	Aston Martin V8 Vantage GT2	M	126
25	GT2	87	(United Kingdom) Drayson Racing	(United Kingdom) Paul Drayson (United Kingdom) Jonny Cocker	Aston Martin AM05 4.5 L V8	M	126
26	GT2	96	(United Kingdom) Virgo Motorsport	(United Kingdom) Sean McInerney (United Kingdom) Michael McInerney (Netherlands) Michael Vergers	Ferrari F430 GT2	D	125
26	GT2	96	(United Kingdom) Virgo Motorsport	(United Kingdom) Sean McInerney (United Kingdom) Michael McInerney (Netherlands) Michael Vergers	Ferrari F136 GT 4.0 L V8	D	125
27	GT2	78	(Italy) Advanced Engineering	(United Kingdom) Peter Bamford (Republic of Ireland) Matt Griffin	Ferrari F430 GT2	M	124
27	GT2	78	(Italy) Advanced Engineering	(United Kingdom) Peter Bamford (Republic of Ireland) Matt Griffin	Ferrari F136 GT 4.0 L V8	M	124
28	GT2	94	(Belgium) Prospeed Competition	(Finland) Markus Palttala (United Kingdom) Paul Daniels	Porsche 997 GT3-RSR	M	124
28	GT2	94	(Belgium) Prospeed Competition	(Finland) Markus Palttala (United Kingdom) Paul Daniels	Porsche M97/74 4.0 L Flat-6	M	124
29	LMP2	39	(Germany) KSM	(Japan) Hideki Noda (Italy) Francesco Sini (Hong Kong) Matthew Marsh	Lola B07/46	D	115
29	LMP2	39	(Germany) KSM	(Japan) Hideki Noda (Italy) Francesco Sini (Hong Kong) Matthew Marsh	Mazda MZR-R 2.0 L Turbo I4	D	115
30	GT1	66	(Austria) Jetalliance Racing	(Austria) Lukas Lichtner-Hoyer (Austria) Thomas Gruber (Germany) Alex Müller	Aston Martin DBR9	M	113
30	GT1	66	(Austria) Jetalliance Racing	(Austria) Lukas Lichtner-Hoyer (Austria) Thomas Gruber (Germany) Alex Müller	Aston Martin AM04 6.0 L V12	M	113
31	GT2	88	(Germany) Team Felbermayr-Proton	(Austria) Horst Felbermayr Jr. (Germany) Christian Ried (Portugal) Francisco Cruz Martins	Porsche 997 GT3-RSR	M	112
31	GT2	88	(Germany) Team Felbermayr-Proton	(Austria) Horst Felbermayr Jr. (Germany) Christian Ried (Portugal) Francisco Cruz Martins	Porsche M97/74 4.0 L Flat-6	M	112
32	LMP2	37	(France) WR Salini	(France) Stéphane Salini (France) Philippe Salini (France) Tristan Gommendy	WR LMP2008	D	110
32	LMP2	37	(France) WR Salini	(France) Stéphane Salini (France) Philippe Salini (France) Tristan Gommendy	Zytek ZG348 3.4 L V8	D	110
33	LMP2	40	(Portugal) Quifel ASM Team	(Portugal) Miguel Amaral (France) Olivier Pla	Ginetta-Zytek GZ09S/2	D	101
33	LMP2	40	(Portugal) Quifel ASM Team	(Portugal) Miguel Amaral (France) Olivier Pla	Zytek ZG348 3.4 L V8	D	101
34 NC	GT2	79	(Germany) Reiter Engineering	(Germany) Albert von Thurn und Taxis (France) Christophe Bouchut	Lamborghini Gallardo LP560 GT2	M	99
34 NC	GT2	79	(Germany) Reiter Engineering	(Germany) Albert von Thurn und Taxis (France) Christophe Bouchut	Lamborghini CEH 5.2 L V10	M	99
35 NC	LMP2	43	(Spain) Q8 Oils Hache Team	(Spain) Máximo Cortés (Spain) Nil Montserrat (France) Pierre Combot	Lucchini LMP2/08	D	88
35 NC	LMP2	43	(Spain) Q8 Oils Hache Team	(Spain) Máximo Cortés (Spain) Nil Montserrat (France) Pierre Combot	Judd XV675 3.4 L V8	D	88
36 NC	LMP1	3	(Monaco) Scuderia Lavaggi	(Monaco) Giovanni Lavaggi (Germany) Wolfgang Kaufmann	Lavaggi LS1	D	49
36 NC	LMP1	3	(Monaco) Scuderia Lavaggi	(Monaco) Giovanni Lavaggi (Germany) Wolfgang Kaufmann	AER P32C 4.0 L Turbo V8	D	49
37 DNF	LMP1	10	(France) Team Oreca Matmut AIM	(Monaco) Stéphane Ortelli (Brazil) Bruno Senna	Oreca 01	M	129
37 DNF	LMP1	10	(France) Team Oreca Matmut AIM	(Monaco) Stéphane Ortelli (Brazil) Bruno Senna	AIM YS5.5 5.5 L V10	M	129
38 DNF	GT2	89	(Germany) Hankook Farnbacher Racing	(Denmark) Allan Simonsen (Germany) Pierre Kaffer	Ferrari F430 GT2	H	110
38 DNF	GT2	89	(Germany) Hankook Farnbacher Racing	(Denmark) Allan Simonsen (Germany) Pierre Kaffer	Ferrari F136 GT 4.0 L V8	H	110
39 DNF	LMP2	41	(Switzerland) GAC Racing Team	(Saudi Arabia) Karim Ojjeh (France) Claude-Yves Gosselin (Austria) Philipp Peter	Zytek 07S/2	M	80
39 DNF	LMP2	41	(Switzerland) GAC Racing Team	(Saudi Arabia) Karim Ojjeh (France) Claude-Yves Gosselin (Austria) Philipp Peter	Zytek ZG348 3.4 L V8	M	80
40 DNF	GT2	81	(Italy) Easyrace	(Italy) Maurice Basso (Italy) Roberto Plati (Italy) Gianpaolo Tenchini	Ferrari F430 GT2	P	75
40 DNF	GT2	81	(Italy) Easyrace	(Italy) Maurice Basso (Italy) Roberto Plati (Italy) Gianpaolo Tenchini	Ferrari F136 GT 4.0 L V8	P	75
41 DNF	GT2	99	(Monaco) JMB Racing	(France) Manuel Rodrigues (United Kingdom) John Hartshorne (Bulgaria) Plamen Kralev	Ferrari F430 GT2	M	57
41 DNF	GT2	99	(Monaco) JMB Racing	(France) Manuel Rodrigues (United Kingdom) John Hartshorne (Bulgaria) Plamen Kralev	Ferrari F136 GT 4.0 L V8	M	57
42 DNF	LMP1	17	(France) Pescarolo Sport	(France) Bruce Jouanny (Portugal) João Barbosa	Pescarolo 01	M	53
42 DNF	LMP1	17	(France) Pescarolo Sport	(France) Bruce Jouanny (Portugal) João Barbosa	Judd GV5.5 S2 5.5 L V10	M	53
43 DNF	GT2	91	(Germany) FBR	(Italy) Gabrio Rosa (Italy) Giacomo Petrobelli (Italy) Andrea Montermini	Ferrari F430 GT2	M	53
43 DNF	GT2	91	(Germany) FBR	(Italy) Gabrio Rosa (Italy) Giacomo Petrobelli (Italy) Andrea Montermini	Ferrari F136 GT 4.0 L V8	M	53
44 DNF	LMP2	25	(United Kingdom) RML	(Brazil) Thomas Erdos (United Kingdom) Mike Newton	Lola B08/86	M	47
44 DNF	LMP2	25	(United Kingdom) RML	(Brazil) Thomas Erdos (United Kingdom) Mike Newton	Mazda MZR-R 2.0 L Turbo I4	M	47
45 DNF	LMP2	28	(France) Ibañez Racing Service	(France) José Ibañez (France) William Cavailhès (France) Frédéric Da Rocha	Courage LC75	D	41
45 DNF	LMP2	28	(France) Ibañez Racing Service	(France) José Ibañez (France) William Cavailhès (France) Frédéric Da Rocha	AER P07 2.0 L Turbo I4	D	41
46 DNF	LMP2	42	(Italy) Ranieri Randaccio	(Italy) Ranieri Randaccio (Italy) Glauco Solieri	Lucchini LMP2/08	D	35
46 DNF	LMP2	42	(Italy) Ranieri Randaccio	(Italy) Ranieri Randaccio (Italy) Glauco Solieri	Nicholson-McLaren 3.3 L V8	D	35
47 DNF	LMP2	30	(Italy) Racing Box	(Italy) Matteo Bobbi (Italy) Andrea Piccini (Italy) Thomas Biagi	Lola B08/80	M	7
47 DNF	LMP2	30	(Italy) Racing Box	(Italy) Matteo Bobbi (Italy) Andrea Piccini (Italy) Thomas Biagi	Judd DB 3.4 L V8	M	7
DSQ	LMP2	29	(Italy) Racing Box	(Italy) Andrea Ceccato (Italy) Filippe Francioni (Italy) Giacomo Piccini	Lola B08/80	M	137
DSQ	LMP2	29	(Italy) Racing Box	(Italy) Andrea Ceccato (Italy) Filippe Francioni (Italy) Giacomo Piccini	Judd DB 3.4 L V8	M	137
DSQ	LMP2	32	(France) Team Barazi-Epsilon	(Denmark) Juan Barazi (Brazil) Fernando Rees	Zytek 07S/2	M	134
DSQ	LMP2	32	(France) Team Barazi-Epsilon	(Denmark) Juan Barazi (Brazil) Fernando Rees	Zytek 2ZG348 3.4 L V8	M	134
DSQ	LMP2	26	(United Kingdom) Bruichladdich-Bruneau Team	(France) Pierre Bruneau (United Kingdom) Stuart Moseley (United Kingdom) Jonathan Coleman	Radical SR9	D	129
DSQ	LMP2	26	(United Kingdom) Bruichladdich-Bruneau Team	(France) Pierre Bruneau (United Kingdom) Stuart Moseley (United Kingdom) Jonathan Coleman	AER P07 2.0 L Turbo I4	D	129
DNS	LMP2	24	OAK Racing; Team Mazda France	(France) Jacques Nicolet (Monaco) Richard Hein	Pescarolo 01	D	-
DNS	LMP2	24	OAK Racing; Team Mazda France	(France) Jacques Nicolet (Monaco) Richard Hein	Mazda MZR-R 2.0 L Turbo I4	D	-

== Bibliography ==
- Stéphane Engoulvent, "1000 Km de Spa : Peugeot assure et se rassure !", Le Mans Racing, ^{no.} 6 (Special issue), June 2009, pg. 70–81
- Cécile Bonardel, Michael Cotton, Marc Laffeas, Olivier Loisy and Jean-Marc Teissedre (trans. David Waldron, Cécile Bonardel), Apollo, 2009, 261 p. (ISBN 9782952104449, read online archive), “Spa-Francorchamps”, pg. 94–125
- Jean-Marc Teissedre and Stéphane Enout, “1000 Km de Spa : Peugeot fin prêt”, Auto Hebdo, ^{no.} 1700, May 13, 2009, pg. 34–45

Le Mans Series
Previous race: 1000 km of Catalunya	2009 season	Next race: 1000 km of Algarve
