= Gibson GJ458 engine =

Zytek GJ458

Overview
- Manufacturer: (United Kingdom) Gibson
- Production: 2018-present

Layout
- Configuration: V8 naturally-aspirated, 90° cylinder angle
- Displacement: 4.5 L (275 cu in)
- Valvetrain: DOHC

Combustion
- Fuel system: Electronic indirect multi-point injection
- Fuel type: Elf LMS 102 RON unleaded gasoline; E10 ethanol

Output
- Power output: 625–700 hp (466–522 kW)
- Torque output: 435 lb⋅ft (590 N⋅m)

Dimensions
- Dry weight: 119 kg (262 lb)

The Zytek GJ458 engine is a 4.5-litre normally-aspirated DOHC V8 engine. It has been developed and produced by Gibson for sports car racing since 2009.

== Applications ==
- Zytek 09S
