= 2009 1000 km of Silverstone =

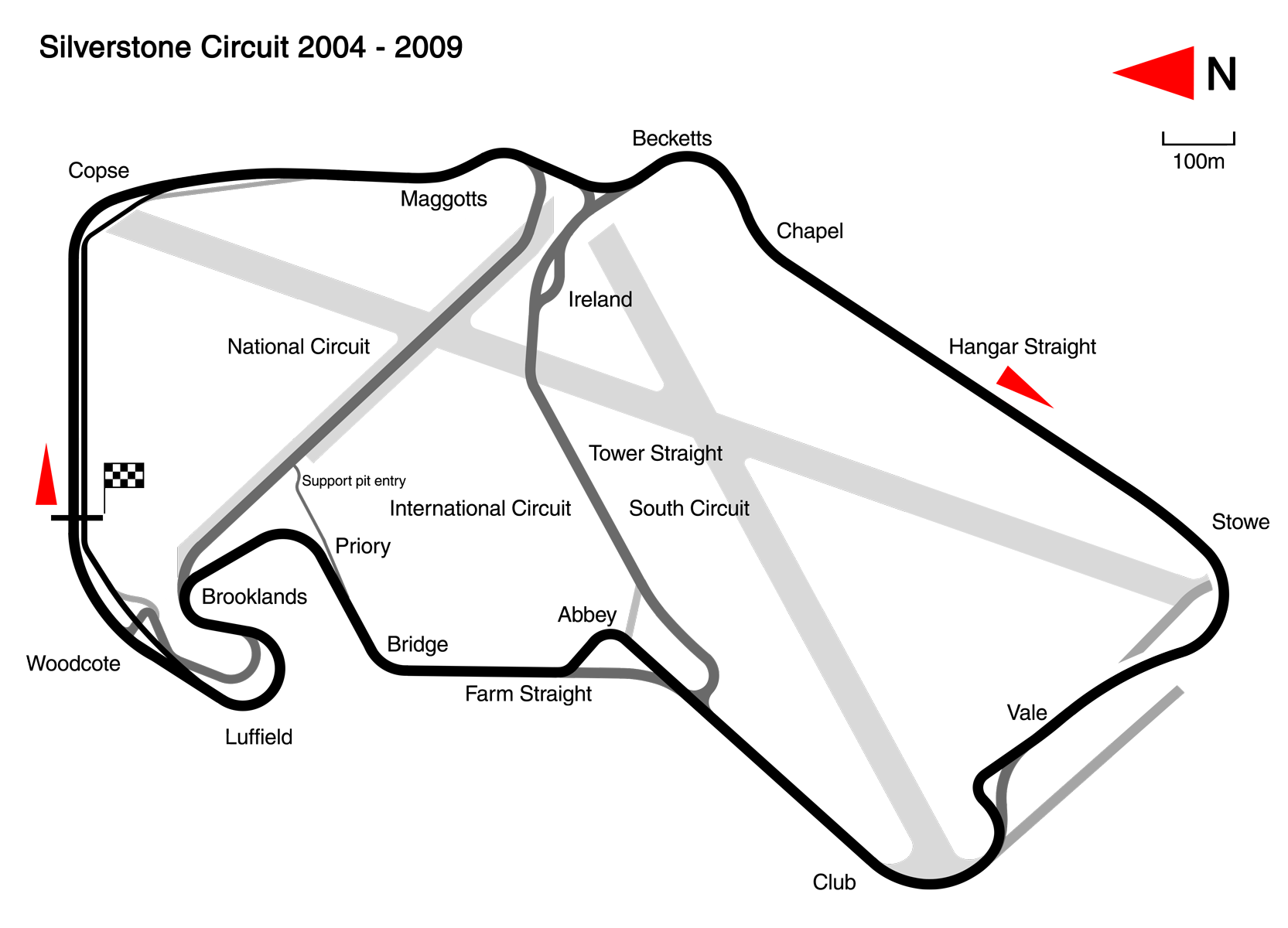
Map of the Silverstone Circuit (2004–2009)

The 2009 Autosport 1000 km of Silverstone was the fifth and final round of the 2009 Le Mans Series season. It took place at the Silverstone Circuit, England, on 13 September 2009. The race was won from pole position by Olivier Panis and Nicolas Lapierre for Team Oreca, while the third-place finishing Aston Martin of Jan Charouz, Tomáš Enge and Stefan Mücke won the LMP1 championship. Speedy Racing Team Sebah won their first race in the LMP2 category while the ASM Team failed to finish but were able to win their championship. First-time LMS entrant Gigawave Motorsport led the GT1 category while JMW Motorsport won in GT2. Team Felbermayr-Proton secured the GT2 class championship by finishing in seventh in their class.

== Report ==
=== Qualifying ===
==== Qualifying result ====
Pole position winners in each class are marked in bold.

Pos	Class	Team	Lap Time
1	**LMP1**	**No. 10 Team Oreca Matmut AIM**	**1:32.798**
2	LMP1	No. 007 Aston Martin Racing	1:33.714
3	LMP1	No. 009 Aston Martin Racing	1:34.618
4	LMP1	No. 13 Speedy Racing Team Sebah	1:34.654
5	LMP1	No. 5 Team LNT	1:35.296
6	LMP1	No. 14 Kolles	1:35.522
7	LMP1	No. 008 AMR Eastern Europe	1:36.014
8	**LMP2**	**No. 40 Quifel ASM Team**	**1:36.092**
9	LMP1	No. 12 Signature Plus	1:36.292
10	LMP2	No. 33 Speedy Racing Team Sebah	1:37.128
11	LMP2	No. 25 RML	1:37.280
12	LMP2	No. 41 GAC Racing Team	1:38.210
13	LMP2	No. 45 Team WFR	1:38.810
14	LMP2	No. 37 WR Salini	1:39.096
15	LMP2	No. 35 OAK Racing	1:39.396
16	LMP2	No. 24 OAK Racing	1:40.116
17	LMP2	No. 28 Ibañez Racing Service	1:41.922
18	LMP2	No. 26 Bruichladdich-Bruneau Team	1:42.340
19	LMP2	No. 43 Q8 Oils Hache Team	1:43.470
20	LMP2	No. 38 Pegasus Racing	1:44.486
21	**GT1**	**No. 50 Larbre Compétition**	**1:45.714**
22	GT1	No. 60 Gigawave Motorsports	1:45.796
23	GT1	No. 72 Luc Alphand Aventures	1:45.848
24	**GT2**	**No. 77 Team Felbermayr-Proton**	**1:48.638**
25	GT2	No. 92 JMW Motorsport	1:48.830
26	GT2	No. 76 IMSA Performance Matmut	1:48.984
27	GT2	No. 84 Team Modena	1:49.358
28	GT2	No. 89 Hankook Team Farnbacher	1:49.570
29	GT2	No. 87 Drayson Racing	1:49.594
30	GT2	No. 91 FBR	1:49.612
31	GT2	No. 90 FBR	1:50.062
32	GT2	No. 85 Snoras Spyker Squadron	1:50.342
33	GT2	No. 78 Advanced Engineering	1:50.710
34	GT2	No. 99 JMB Racing	1:51.126
35	GT2	No. 88 Team Felbermayr-Proton	1:52.176
36	GT2	No. 81 Easyrace	1:52.630
37	GT2	No. 95 James Watt Automotive	1:52.920
38	LMP1	No. 16 Pescarolo Sport	5:31.444
39	LMP1	No. 15 Kolles	5:59.292
40	LMP1	No. 23 Strakka Racing	No Time

=== Race ===
==== Race result ====
Class winners in bold. Cars failing to complete 70% of winner's distance marked as Not Classified (NC).

Pos	Class	No	Team	Drivers	Chassis	Tyre	Laps
Pos	Class	No	Team	Drivers	Engine	Tyre	Laps
1	**LMP1**	**10**	**(France) Team Oreca Matmut AIM**	**(France) Olivier Panis (France) Nicolas Lapierre**	**Oreca 01**	MI	**195**
1	**LMP1**	**10**	**(France) Team Oreca Matmut AIM**	**(France) Olivier Panis (France) Nicolas Lapierre**	**AIM YS5.5 5.5 L V10**	MI	**195**
2	LMP1	13	(Switzerland) Speedy Racing Team (United Kingdom) Sebah Automotive	(Switzerland) Marcel Fässler (Italy) Andrea Belicchi (France) Nicolas Prost	Lola B08/60	MI	195
2	LMP1	13	(Switzerland) Speedy Racing Team (United Kingdom) Sebah Automotive	(Switzerland) Marcel Fässler (Italy) Andrea Belicchi (France) Nicolas Prost	Aston Martin AM04 6.0 L V12	MI	195
3	LMP1	007	(United Kingdom) Aston Martin Racing	(Czech Republic) Jan Charouz (Czech Republic) Tomáš Enge (Germany) Stefan Mücke	Lola-Aston Martin B09/60	MI	195
3	LMP1	007	(United Kingdom) Aston Martin Racing	(Czech Republic) Jan Charouz (Czech Republic) Tomáš Enge (Germany) Stefan Mücke	Aston Martin AM04 6.0 L V12	MI	195
4	LMP1	009	(United Kingdom) Aston Martin Racing	(United Kingdom) Darren Turner (Switzerland) Harold Primat	Lola-Aston Martin B09/60	MI	195
4	LMP1	009	(United Kingdom) Aston Martin Racing	(United Kingdom) Darren Turner (Switzerland) Harold Primat	Aston Martin AM04 6.0 L V12	MI	195
5	LMP1	15	(Germany) Kolles	(Netherlands) Christijan Albers (Denmark) Christian Bakkerud	Audi R10 TDI	MI	194
5	LMP1	15	(Germany) Kolles	(Netherlands) Christijan Albers (Denmark) Christian Bakkerud	Audi TDI 5.5 L Turbo V12 (Diesel)	MI	194
6	LMP1	14	(Germany) Kolles	(India) Narain Karthikeyan (United Kingdom) Andrew Meyrick (Netherlands) Charles Zwolsman Jr.	Audi R10 TDI	MI	193
6	LMP1	14	(Germany) Kolles	(India) Narain Karthikeyan (United Kingdom) Andrew Meyrick (Netherlands) Charles Zwolsman Jr.	Audi TDI 5.5 L Turbo V12 (Diesel)	MI	193
7	LMP1	12	(France) Signature Plus	(France) Pierre Ragues (France) Franck Mailleux	Courage-Oreca LC70E	MI	193
7	LMP1	12	(France) Signature Plus	(France) Pierre Ragues (France) Franck Mailleux	Judd GV5.5 S2 5.5 L V10	MI	193
8	**LMP2**	**33**	**(Switzerland) Speedy Racing Team (United Kingdom) Sebah Automotive**	**(Switzerland) Benjamin Leuenberger (France) Xavier Pompidou (United Kingdom) Jonny Kane**	**Lola B08/80**	MI	**190**
8	**LMP2**	**33**	**(Switzerland) Speedy Racing Team (United Kingdom) Sebah Automotive**	**(Switzerland) Benjamin Leuenberger (France) Xavier Pompidou (United Kingdom) Jonny Kane**	**Judd DB 3.4 L V8**	MI	**190**
9	LMP1	23	(United Kingdom) Strakka Racing	(United Kingdom) Nick Leventis (United Kingdom) Danny Watts	Ginetta-Zytek GZ09S	MI	189
9	LMP1	23	(United Kingdom) Strakka Racing	(United Kingdom) Nick Leventis (United Kingdom) Danny Watts	Zytek ZJ458 4.5 L V8	MI	189
10	LMP2	25	(United Kingdom) RML	(Brazil) Thomas Erdos (United Kingdom) Mike Newton	Lola B08/86	MI	186
10	LMP2	25	(United Kingdom) RML	(Brazil) Thomas Erdos (United Kingdom) Mike Newton	MG (AER) XP-21 2.0 L Turbo I4	MI	186
11	LMP2	24	OAK Racing; Team Mazda France	(France) Jacques Nicolet (Monaco) Richard Hein	Pescarolo 01	D	184
11	LMP2	24	OAK Racing; Team Mazda France	(France) Jacques Nicolet (Monaco) Richard Hein	Mazda MZR-R 2.0 L Turbo I4	D	184
12	LMP1	008	(Czech Republic) AMR Eastern Europe	(Portugal) Miguel Ramos (United Kingdom) Stuart Hall (United Kingdom) Chris Buncombe	Lola-Aston Martin B09/60	MI	182
12	LMP1	008	(Czech Republic) AMR Eastern Europe	(Portugal) Miguel Ramos (United Kingdom) Stuart Hall (United Kingdom) Chris Buncombe	Aston Martin AM04 6.0 L V12	MI	182
13	LMP1	16	(France) Pescarolo Sport	(France) Jean-Christophe Boullion (France) Christophe Tinseau	Pescarolo 01	MI	181
13	LMP1	16	(France) Pescarolo Sport	(France) Jean-Christophe Boullion (France) Christophe Tinseau	Judd GV5.5 S2 5.5 L V10	MI	181
14	LMP2	45	(United Kingdom) Team WFR	(United Kingdom) Darren Manning (United Kingdom) Warren Hughes (United Kingdom) Jody Firth	Embassy WF01	D	179
14	LMP2	45	(United Kingdom) Team WFR	(United Kingdom) Darren Manning (United Kingdom) Warren Hughes (United Kingdom) Jody Firth	Zytek ZG348 3.4 L V8	D	179
15	LMP2	41	(Switzerland) GAC Racing Team	(Saudi Arabia) Karim Ojjeh (France) Claude-Yves Gosselin (Austria) Philipp Peter	Zytek 07S/2	MI	179
15	LMP2	41	(Switzerland) GAC Racing Team	(Saudi Arabia) Karim Ojjeh (France) Claude-Yves Gosselin (Austria) Philipp Peter	Zytek ZG348 3.4 L V8	MI	179
16	LMP2	26	(United Kingdom) Bruichladdich-Bruneau Team	(France) Pierre Bruneau (United Kingdom) Tim Greaves (Italy) Francesco Sini	Radical SR9	D	179
16	LMP2	26	(United Kingdom) Bruichladdich-Bruneau Team	(France) Pierre Bruneau (United Kingdom) Tim Greaves (Italy) Francesco Sini	AER P07 2.0 L Turbo I4	D	179
17	LMP2	28	(France) Ibañez Racing Service	(France) José Ibañez (France) William Cavailhès (France) Frédéric da Rocha	Courage LC75	D	175
17	LMP2	28	(France) Ibañez Racing Service	(France) José Ibañez (France) William Cavailhès (France) Frédéric da Rocha	AER P07 2.0 L Turbo I4	D	175
18	LMP2	38	(France) Pegasus Racing	(France) Julien Schell (France) Philippe Thirion (Switzerland) Jean-Christophe Metz	Courage-Oreca LC75	A	175
18	LMP2	38	(France) Pegasus Racing	(France) Julien Schell (France) Philippe Thirion (Switzerland) Jean-Christophe Metz	AER P07 2.0 L Turbo I4	A	175
19	**GT1**	**60**	**(United Kingdom) Gigawave Motorsport**	**(United Kingdom) Ryan Sharp (Netherlands) Peter Kox**	**Aston Martin DBR9**	MI	**175**
19	**GT1**	**60**	**(United Kingdom) Gigawave Motorsport**	**(United Kingdom) Ryan Sharp (Netherlands) Peter Kox**	**Aston Martin AM04 6.0 L V12**	MI	**175**
20	LMP2	37	(France) WR Salini	(France) Stéphane Salini (France) Philippe Salini (France) Tristan Gommendy	WR LMP2008	D	174
20	LMP2	37	(France) WR Salini	(France) Stéphane Salini (France) Philippe Salini (France) Tristan Gommendy	Zytek ZG348 3.4 L V8	D	174
21	GT1	50	(France) Larbre Compétition	(France) Roland Berville (France) Sébastien Dumez (France) Laurent Groppi	Saleen S7-R	MI	174
21	GT1	50	(France) Larbre Compétition	(France) Roland Berville (France) Sébastien Dumez (France) Laurent Groppi	Ford Windsor 7.0 L V8	MI	174
22	GT1	72	(France) Luc Alphand Aventures	(France) Yann Clairay (France) Patrice Goueslard (France) Julien Jousse	Chevrolet Corvette C6.R	D	173
22	GT1	72	(France) Luc Alphand Aventures	(France) Yann Clairay (France) Patrice Goueslard (France) Julien Jousse	Chevrolet LS7.R 7.0 L V8	D	173
23	**GT2**	**92**	**(United Kingdom) JMW Motorsport**	**(United Kingdom) Rob Bell (Italy) Gianmaria Bruni**	**Ferrari F430 GT2**	D	**172**
23	**GT2**	**92**	**(United Kingdom) JMW Motorsport**	**(United Kingdom) Rob Bell (Italy) Gianmaria Bruni**	**Ferrari F136 GT 4.0 L V8**	D	**172**
24	GT2	85	(Netherlands) Snoras Spyker Squadron	(Netherlands) Tom Coronel (Czech Republic) Jaroslav Janiš	Spyker C8 Laviolette GT2-R	MI	170
24	GT2	85	(Netherlands) Snoras Spyker Squadron	(Netherlands) Tom Coronel (Czech Republic) Jaroslav Janiš	Audi 4.0 L V8	MI	170
25	GT2	76	(France) IMSA Performance Matmut	(France) Patrick Pilet (France) Raymond Narac	Porsche 997 GT3-RSR	MI	170
25	GT2	76	(France) IMSA Performance Matmut	(France) Patrick Pilet (France) Raymond Narac	Porsche M97/74 4.0 L Flat-6	MI	170
26	GT2	84	(United Kingdom) Team Modena	(Spain) Antonio García (United Kingdom) Leo Mansell (Brazil) Jaime Melo	Ferrari F430 GT2	MI	170
26	GT2	84	(United Kingdom) Team Modena	(Spain) Antonio García (United Kingdom) Leo Mansell (Brazil) Jaime Melo	Ferrari F136 GT 4.0 L V8	MI	170
27	GT2	89	(Germany) Hankook Team Farnbacher	(San Marino) Christian Montanari (Germany) Pierre Kaffer	Ferrari F430 GT2	HK	170
27	GT2	89	(Germany) Hankook Team Farnbacher	(San Marino) Christian Montanari (Germany) Pierre Kaffer	Ferrari F136 GT 4.0 L V8	HK	170
28	LMP1	5	(United Kingdom) Team LNT	(United Kingdom) Nigel Mansell (United Kingdom) Greg Mansell (United Kingdom) Lawrence Tomlinson	Ginetta-Zytek GZ09S	MI	168
28	LMP1	5	(United Kingdom) Team LNT	(United Kingdom) Nigel Mansell (United Kingdom) Greg Mansell (United Kingdom) Lawrence Tomlinson	Zytek ZJ458 4.5 L V8	MI	168
29	GT2	91	(Germany) FBR	(Italy) Andrea Montermini (Italy) Niki Cadei (Italy) Gabrio Rosa	Ferrari F430 GT2	MI	168
29	GT2	91	(Germany) FBR	(Italy) Andrea Montermini (Italy) Niki Cadei (Italy) Gabrio Rosa	Ferrari F136 GT 4.0 L V8	MI	168
30	GT2	77	(Germany) Team Felbermayr-Proton	(Germany) Marc Lieb (Austria) Richard Lietz (Austria) Horst Felbermayr Sr.	Porsche 997 GT3-RSR	MI	165
30	GT2	77	(Germany) Team Felbermayr-Proton	(Germany) Marc Lieb (Austria) Richard Lietz (Austria) Horst Felbermayr Sr.	Porsche M97/74 4.0 L Flat-6	MI	165
31	GT2	88	(Germany) Team Felbermayr-Proton	(Austria) Horst Felbermayr Jr. (Germany) Christian Ried (Portugal) Francisco Cruz Martins	Porsche 997 GT3-RSR	MI	165
31	GT2	88	(Germany) Team Felbermayr-Proton	(Austria) Horst Felbermayr Jr. (Germany) Christian Ried (Portugal) Francisco Cruz Martins	Porsche M97/74 4.0 L Flat-6	MI	165
32	GT2	95	(United Kingdom) James Watt Automotive	(United Kingdom) Paul Daniels (United Kingdom) Martin Rich (Finland) Markus Palttala	Porsche 997 GT3-RSR	D	164
32	GT2	95	(United Kingdom) James Watt Automotive	(United Kingdom) Paul Daniels (United Kingdom) Martin Rich (Finland) Markus Palttala	Porsche M97/74 4.0 L Flat-6	D	164
33	GT2	78	(Italy) Advanced Engineering	(United Kingdom) Peter Bamford (Republic of Ireland) Matt Griffin	Ferrari F430 GT2	MI	164
33	GT2	78	(Italy) Advanced Engineering	(United Kingdom) Peter Bamford (Republic of Ireland) Matt Griffin	Ferrari F136 GT 4.0 L V8	MI	164
34	GT2	81	(Italy) Easyrace	(Italy) Maurice Basso (Italy) Roberto Plati (Italy) Gianpaolo Tenchini	Ferrari F430 GT2	P	161
34	GT2	81	(Italy) Easyrace	(Italy) Maurice Basso (Italy) Roberto Plati (Italy) Gianpaolo Tenchini	Ferrari F136 GT 4.0 L V8	P	161
35	GT2	99	(Monaco) JMB Racing	(United Kingdom) John Hartshorne (Netherlands) Peter Kutemann (France) Stéphane Daoudi	Ferrari F430 GT2	MI	160
35	GT2	99	(Monaco) JMB Racing	(United Kingdom) John Hartshorne (Netherlands) Peter Kutemann (France) Stéphane Daoudi	Ferrari F136 GT 4.0 L V8	MI	160
36 NC	LMP2	43	(Spain) Q8 Oils Hache Team	(Spain) Máximo Cortés (Spain) Fonsi Nieto (Spain) Carmen Jordá	Lucchini LMP2/08	D	135
36 NC	LMP2	43	(Spain) Q8 Oils Hache Team	(Spain) Máximo Cortés (Spain) Fonsi Nieto (Spain) Carmen Jordá	Judd XV675 3.4 L V8	D	135
37 NC	GT2	90	(Germany) FBR	(Germany) Pierre Ehret (Germany) Dominik Farnbacher (France) Anthony Beltoise	Ferrari F430 GT2	MI	131
37 NC	GT2	90	(Germany) FBR	(Germany) Pierre Ehret (Germany) Dominik Farnbacher (France) Anthony Beltoise	Ferrari F136 GT 4.0 L V8	MI	131
38 DNF	LMP2	35	OAK Racing; Team Mazda France	(France) Matthieu Lahaye (Switzerland) Karim Ajlani	Pescarolo 01	D	138
38 DNF	LMP2	35	OAK Racing; Team Mazda France	(France) Matthieu Lahaye (Switzerland) Karim Ajlani	Mazda MZR-R 2.0 L Turbo I4	D	138
39 DNF	GT2	87	(United Kingdom) Drayson Racing	(United Kingdom) Paul Drayson (United Kingdom) Jonny Cocker	Aston Martin V8 Vantage GT2	MI	122
39 DNF	GT2	87	(United Kingdom) Drayson Racing	(United Kingdom) Paul Drayson (United Kingdom) Jonny Cocker	Aston Martin AM05 4.5 L V8	MI	122
40 DNF	LMP2	40	(Portugal) Quifel ASM Team	(Portugal) Miguel Amaral (France) Olivier Pla	Ginetta-Zytek GZ09S/2	D	32
40 DNF	LMP2	40	(Portugal) Quifel ASM Team	(Portugal) Miguel Amaral (France) Olivier Pla	Zytek ZG348 3.4 L V8	D	32

Le Mans Series
Previous race: 1000 km of Nürburgring	2009 season	Next race: None
