= 2009 1000 km of Catalunya =

Layout of the Circuit de Catalunya (2007-2020)

The 2009 1000 km of Catalunya was the opening round of the 2009 Le Mans Series season. It took place at the Circuit de Catalunya in Montmeló, Spain on 5 April 2009. Aston Martin Racing won overall on their debut of the Lola-Aston Martin B09/60, while Lola also secured the LMP2 win with Racing Box. The GT1 category was won by the IPB Spartak Racing Lamborghini, while Team Felbermayr-Proton's Porsche led GT2.

== Report ==
=== Qualifying ===
==== Qualifying result ====
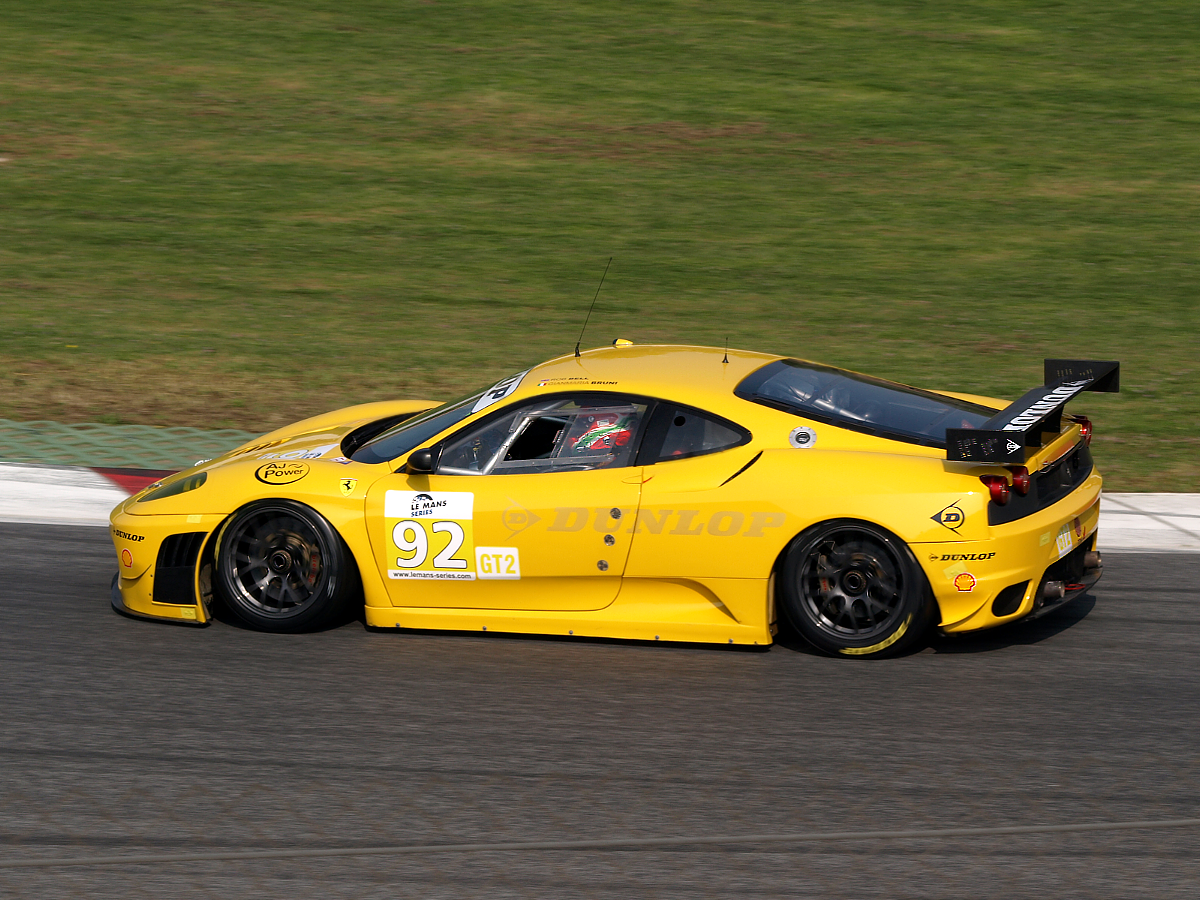
JMW Motorsport's Ferrari F430 of Rob Bell and Gianmaria Bruni, that qualified in pole position in the GT2 class.

Pole position winners in each class are marked in bold.

Pos	Class	Team	Lap Time
1	**LMP1**	**No. 23 Strakka Racing**	**1:32.492**
2	LMP1	No. 009 Aston Martin Racing	1:32.942
3	LMP1	No. 007 Aston Martin Racing	1:33.532
4	LMP1	No. 16 Pescarolo Sport	1:33.572
5	LMP1	No. 13 Speedy Racing Team Sebah	1:33.724
6	LMP1	No. 15 Kolles	1:34.266
7	LMP1	No. 10 Team Oreca Matmut AIM	1:34.442
8	LMP1	No. 11 Team Oreca Matmut AIM	1:34.566
9	LMP1	No. 12 Signature Plus	1:35.044
10	LMP1	No. 17 Pescarolo Sport	1:35.412
11	LMP1	No. 14 Kolles	1:35.526
12	**LMP2**	**No. 29 Racing Box**	**1:36.156**
13	LMP2	No. 40 Quifel ASM Team	1:36.172
14	LMP2	No. 33 Speedy Racing Team Sebah	1:36.328
15	LMP2	No. 30 Racing Box	1:37.026
16	LMP2	No. 25 RML	1:37.032
17	LMP2	No. 41 GAC Racing Team	1:38.018
18	LMP2	No. 39 KSM	1:39.130
19	LMP2	No. 37 WR Salini	1:39.184
20	LMP2	No. 35 OAK Racing	1:39.856
21	LMP2	No. 26 Bruichladdich-Bruneau Team	1:40.342
22	LMP2	No. 38 Pegasus Racing	1:43.426
23	**GT1**	**No. 55 IPB Spartak Racing**	**1:44.446**
24	LMP2	No. 42 Ranieri Randaccio	1:45.150
25	GT1	No. 72 Luc Alphand Aventures	1:45.926
26	GT1	No. 50 Larbre Compétition	1:46.834
27	GT1	No. 51 ARC Bratislava Kaneko	1:46.902
28	LMP2	No. 43 Q8 Oils Hache Team	1:47.288
29	**GT2**	**No. 92 JMW Motorsport**	**1:48.606**
30	GT2	No. 84 Team Modena	1:48.666
31	GT2	No. 76 IMSA Performance Matmut	1:48.752
32	LMP2	No. 28 Ibañez Racing Service	1:48.836
33	GT2	No. 77 Team Felbermayr-Proton	1:49.006
34	GT2	No. 99 JMB Racing	1:49.424
35	GT2	No. 89 Hankook Farnbacher Racing	1:49.552
36	GT2	No. 90 FBR	1:49.848
37	GT2	No. 91 FBR	1:50.164
38	GT2	No. 85 Snoras Spyker Squadron	1:50.180
39	GT2	No. 96 Virgo Motorsport	1:50.368
40	GT2	No. 87 Drayson Racing	1:50.492
41	GT2	No. 88 Team Felbermayr-Proton	1:51.368
42	GT2	No. 81 Easyrace	1:51.470
43	LMP2	No. 24 OAK Racing	No Time

=== Race ===
==== Race results ====
Class winners in bold. Cars failing to complete 70% of winner's distance marked as Not Classified (NC).

Pos	Class	No	Team	Drivers	Chassis	Tyre	Laps
Pos	Class	No	Team	Drivers	Engine	Tyre	Laps
1	**LMP1**	**007**	**(United Kingdom) Aston Martin Racing**	**(Czech Republic) Jan Charouz (Czech Republic) Tomáš Enge (Germany) Stefan Mücke**	**Lola-Aston Martin B09/60**	M	**209**
1	**LMP1**	**007**	**(United Kingdom) Aston Martin Racing**	**(Czech Republic) Jan Charouz (Czech Republic) Tomáš Enge (Germany) Stefan Mücke**	**Aston Martin AM04 6.0 L V12**	M	**209**
2	LMP1	16	(France) Pescarolo Sport	(France) Jean-Christophe Boullion (France) Christophe Tinseau	Pescarolo 01	M	209
2	LMP1	16	(France) Pescarolo Sport	(France) Jean-Christophe Boullion (France) Christophe Tinseau	Judd GV5.5 S2 5.5 L V10	M	209
3	LMP1	10	(France) Team Oreca Matmut AIM	(Monaco) Stéphane Ortelli (Brazil) Bruno Senna	Courage-Oreca LC70E	M	206
3	LMP1	10	(France) Team Oreca Matmut AIM	(Monaco) Stéphane Ortelli (Brazil) Bruno Senna	AIM YS5.5 5.5 L V10	M	206
4	LMP1	12	(France) Signature Plus	(France) Pierre Ragues (France) Franck Mailleux	Courage-Oreca LC70E	M	206
4	LMP1	12	(France) Signature Plus	(France) Pierre Ragues (France) Franck Mailleux	Judd GV5.5 S2 5.5 L V10	M	206
5	LMP1	23	(United Kingdom) Strakka Racing	(United Kingdom) Nick Leventis (United Kingdom) Peter Hardman (United Kingdom) Danny Watts	Ginetta-Zytek GZ09S	M	205
5	LMP1	23	(United Kingdom) Strakka Racing	(United Kingdom) Nick Leventis (United Kingdom) Peter Hardman (United Kingdom) Danny Watts	Zytek ZJ458 4.5 L V8	M	205
6	LMP1	17	(France) Pescarolo Sport	(France) Bruce Jouanny (Portugal) João Barbosa	Pescarolo 01	M	203
6	LMP1	17	(France) Pescarolo Sport	(France) Bruce Jouanny (Portugal) João Barbosa	Judd GV5.5 S2 5.5 L V10	M	203
7	**LMP2**	**30**	**(Italy) Racing Box**	**(Italy) Matteo Bobbi (Italy) Andrea Piccini (Italy) Thomas Biagi**	**Lola B08/80**	M	**201**
7	**LMP2**	**30**	**(Italy) Racing Box**	**(Italy) Matteo Bobbi (Italy) Andrea Piccini (Italy) Thomas Biagi**	**Judd DB 3.4 L V8**	M	**201**
8	LMP2	40	(Portugal) Quifel ASM Team	(Portugal) Miguel Amaral (France) Olivier Pla	Ginetta-Zytek GZ09S/2	D	201
8	LMP2	40	(Portugal) Quifel ASM Team	(Portugal) Miguel Amaral (France) Olivier Pla	Zytek ZG348 3.4 L V8	D	201
9	LMP2	29	(Italy) Racing Box	(Italy) Andrea Ceccato (Italy) Filippo Francioni (Italy) Giacomo Piccini	Lola B08/80	M	195
9	LMP2	29	(Italy) Racing Box	(Italy) Andrea Ceccato (Italy) Filippo Francioni (Italy) Giacomo Piccini	Judd DB 3.4 L V8	M	195
10	LMP2	26	(United Kingdom) Bruichladdich-Bruneau Team	(France) Pierre Bruneau (United Kingdom) Stuart Moseley (United Kingdom) Nigel Greensall	Radical SR9	D	193
10	LMP2	26	(United Kingdom) Bruichladdich-Bruneau Team	(France) Pierre Bruneau (United Kingdom) Stuart Moseley (United Kingdom) Nigel Greensall	AER P07 2.0 L Turbo I4	D	193
11	LMP2	35	OAK Racing; Team Mazda France	(France) Matthieu Lahaye (Switzerland) Karim Ajlani	Pescarolo 01	D	190
11	LMP2	35	OAK Racing; Team Mazda France	(France) Matthieu Lahaye (Switzerland) Karim Ajlani	Mazda MZR-R 2.0 L Turbo I4	D	190
12	LMP2	24	OAK Racing; Team Mazda France	(France) Jacques Nicolet (Monaco) Richard Hein	Pescarolo 01	D	190
12	LMP2	24	OAK Racing; Team Mazda France	(France) Jacques Nicolet (Monaco) Richard Hein	Mazda MZR-R 2.0 L Turbo I4	D	190
13	**GT1**	**55**	**(Russia) IPB Spartak Racing**	**(Russia) Roman Rusinov (Netherlands) Peter Kox**	**Lamborghini Murciélago R-GT**	M	**189**
13	**GT1**	**55**	**(Russia) IPB Spartak Racing**	**(Russia) Roman Rusinov (Netherlands) Peter Kox**	**Lamborghini L535 6.0 L V12**	M	**189**
14	**GT2**	**77**	**(Germany) Team Felbermayr-Proton**	**(Germany) Marc Lieb (Austria) Richard Lietz**	**Porsche 997 GT3-RSR**	M	**187**
14	**GT2**	**77**	**(Germany) Team Felbermayr-Proton**	**(Germany) Marc Lieb (Austria) Richard Lietz**	**Porsche M97/74 4.0 L Flat-6**	M	**187**
15	GT1	72	(France) Luc Alphand Aventures	(France) Luc Alphand (France) Patrice Goueslard (France) Yann Clairay	Chevrolet Corvette C6.R	D	187
15	GT1	72	(France) Luc Alphand Aventures	(France) Luc Alphand (France) Patrice Goueslard (France) Yann Clairay	Chevrolet LS7.R 7.0 L V8	D	187
16	GT2	92	(United Kingdom) JMW Motorsport	(United Kingdom) Rob Bell (Italy) Gianmaria Bruni	Ferrari F430 GT2	D	186
16	GT2	92	(United Kingdom) JMW Motorsport	(United Kingdom) Rob Bell (Italy) Gianmaria Bruni	Ferrari F136 GT 4.0 L V8	D	186
17	GT2	89	(Germany) Hankook Farnbacher Racing	(Denmark) Allan Simonsen (San Marino) Christian Montanari	Ferrari F430 GT2	H	185
17	GT2	89	(Germany) Hankook Farnbacher Racing	(Denmark) Allan Simonsen (San Marino) Christian Montanari	Ferrari F136 GT 4.0 L V8	H	185
18	GT2	90	(Germany) FBR	(Germany) Pierre Ehret (France) Anthony Beltoise	Ferrari F430 GT2	M	185
18	GT2	90	(Germany) FBR	(Germany) Pierre Ehret (France) Anthony Beltoise	Ferrari F136 GT 4.0 L V8	M	185
19	GT2	84	(United Kingdom) Team Modena	(Spain) Antonio García (United Kingdom) Leo Mansell	Ferrari F430 GT2	M	185
19	GT2	84	(United Kingdom) Team Modena	(Spain) Antonio García (United Kingdom) Leo Mansell	Ferrari F136 GT 4.0 L V8	M	185
20	LMP2	33	(Switzerland) Speedy Racing Team (United Kingdom) Sebah Automotive	(France) Xavier Pompidou (United Kingdom) Jonny Kane	Lola B08/80	M	184
20	LMP2	33	(Switzerland) Speedy Racing Team (United Kingdom) Sebah Automotive	(France) Xavier Pompidou (United Kingdom) Jonny Kane	Judd DB 3.4 L V8	M	184
21	GT2	99	(Monaco) JMB Racing	(France) Johan-Boris Scheier (France) Romain Iannetta (United Kingdom) John Hartshorne	Ferrari F430 GT2	M	184
21	GT2	99	(Monaco) JMB Racing	(France) Johan-Boris Scheier (France) Romain Iannetta (United Kingdom) John Hartshorne	Ferrari F136 GT 4.0 L V8	M	184
22	GT1	50	(France) Larbre Compétition	(Switzerland) Steve Zacchia (France) Roland Bervillé (France) Sébastien Dumez	Saleen S7-R	M	184
22	GT1	50	(France) Larbre Compétition	(Switzerland) Steve Zacchia (France) Roland Bervillé (France) Sébastien Dumez	Ford Windsor 7.0 L V8	M	184
23	GT2	88	(Germany) Team Felbermayr-Proton	(Austria) Horst Felbermayr Jr. (Germany) Christian Ried (Portugal) Francisco Cruz Martins	Porsche 997 GT3-RSR	M	182
23	GT2	88	(Germany) Team Felbermayr-Proton	(Austria) Horst Felbermayr Jr. (Germany) Christian Ried (Portugal) Francisco Cruz Martins	Porsche M97/74 4.0 L Flat-6	M	182
24	GT2	87	(United Kingdom) Drayson Racing	(United Kingdom) Paul Drayson (United Kingdom) Jonny Cocker	Aston Martin V8 Vantage GT2	M	181
24	GT2	87	(United Kingdom) Drayson Racing	(United Kingdom) Paul Drayson (United Kingdom) Jonny Cocker	Aston Martin AM05 4.5 L V8	M	181
25	GT2	96	(United Kingdom) Virgo Motorsport	(United Kingdom) Sean McInerney (United Kingdom) Michael McInerney (Netherlands) Michael Vergers	Ferrari F430 GT2	D	181
25	GT2	96	(United Kingdom) Virgo Motorsport	(United Kingdom) Sean McInerney (United Kingdom) Michael McInerney (Netherlands) Michael Vergers	Ferrari F136 GT 4.0 L V8	D	181
26	LMP1	13	(Switzerland) Speedy Racing Team (United Kingdom) Sebah Automotive	(Switzerland) Marcel Fässler (Italy) Andrea Belicchi (France) Nicolas Prost	Lola B08/60	M	180
26	LMP1	13	(Switzerland) Speedy Racing Team (United Kingdom) Sebah Automotive	(Switzerland) Marcel Fässler (Italy) Andrea Belicchi (France) Nicolas Prost	Aston Martin AM04 6.0 L V12	M	180
27	LMP1	14	(Germany) Kolles	(Germany) Michael Krumm (Netherlands) Charles Zwolsman Jr. (United Kingdom) Andy Meyrick	Audi R10 TDI	M	179
27	LMP1	14	(Germany) Kolles	(Germany) Michael Krumm (Netherlands) Charles Zwolsman Jr. (United Kingdom) Andy Meyrick	Audi TDI 5.5 L Turbo V12 (Diesel)	M	179
28	LMP2	41	(Switzerland) GAC Racing Team	(Saudi Arabia) Karim Ojjeh (France) Claude-Yves Gosselin (Austria) Philipp Peter	Zytek 07S/2	M	179
28	LMP2	41	(Switzerland) GAC Racing Team	(Saudi Arabia) Karim Ojjeh (France) Claude-Yves Gosselin (Austria) Philipp Peter	Zytek ZG348 3.4 L V8	M	179
29	GT2	81	(Italy) Easyrace	(Italy) Paolo Maurice Basso (Italy) Roberto Plati (Italy) Gianpaolo Tenchini	Ferrari F430 GT2	P	175
29	GT2	81	(Italy) Easyrace	(Italy) Paolo Maurice Basso (Italy) Roberto Plati (Italy) Gianpaolo Tenchini	Ferrari F136 4.0 L V8	P	175
30	LMP2	37	(France) WR Salini	(France) Stéphane Salini (France) Philippe Salini (France) Tristan Gommendy	WR LMP2008	D	163
30	LMP2	37	(France) WR Salini	(France) Stéphane Salini (France) Philippe Salini (France) Tristan Gommendy	Zytek ZG348 3.4 L V8	D	163
31 DNF	LMP1	009	(United Kingdom) Aston Martin Racing	(United Kingdom) Darren Turner (Switzerland) Harold Primat (Portugal) Miguel Ramos	Lola-Aston Martin B09/60	M	181
31 DNF	LMP1	009	(United Kingdom) Aston Martin Racing	(United Kingdom) Darren Turner (Switzerland) Harold Primat (Portugal) Miguel Ramos	Aston Martin AM04 6.0 L V12	M	181
32 DNF	LMP1	15	(Germany) Kolles	(Denmark) Christian Bakkerud (Netherlands) Christijan Albers	Audi R10 TDI	M	153
32 DNF	LMP1	15	(Germany) Kolles	(Denmark) Christian Bakkerud (Netherlands) Christijan Albers	Audi TDI 5.5 L Turbo V12 (Diesel)	M	153
33 DNF	GT1	51	(Slovakia) ARC Bratislava (Japan) Kaneko Racing	(Slovakia) Miro Konôpka (United Kingdom) Paul Daniels (United Kingdom) Sean Edwards	Saleen S7-R	D	139
33 DNF	GT1	51	(Slovakia) ARC Bratislava (Japan) Kaneko Racing	(Slovakia) Miro Konôpka (United Kingdom) Paul Daniels (United Kingdom) Sean Edwards	Ford Windsor 7.0 L V8	D	139
34 DNF	LMP2	39	(Germany) KSM	(Japan) Hideki Noda (Italy) Francesco Sini (Hong Kong) Matthew Marsh	Lola B07/46	D	133
34 DNF	LMP2	39	(Germany) KSM	(Japan) Hideki Noda (Italy) Francesco Sini (Hong Kong) Matthew Marsh	Mazda MZR-R 2.0 L Turbo I4	D	133
35 DNF	LMP2	38	(France) Pegasus Racing	(France) Julien Schell (France) Philippe Thirion	Courage-Oreca LC75	A	118
35 DNF	LMP2	38	(France) Pegasus Racing	(France) Julien Schell (France) Philippe Thirion	AER P07 2.0 L Turbo I4	A	118
36 DNF	LMP2	28	(France) Ibañez Racing Service	(France) José Ibañez (France) William Cavailhès (France) Frédéric Da Rocha	Courage LC75	D	116
36 DNF	LMP2	28	(France) Ibañez Racing Service	(France) José Ibañez (France) William Cavailhès (France) Frédéric Da Rocha	AER P07 2.0 L Turbo I4	D	116
37 DNF	GT2	76	(France) IMSA Performance Matmut	(France) Patrick Pilet (France) Raymond Narac	Porsche 997 GT3-RSR	M	115
37 DNF	GT2	76	(France) IMSA Performance Matmut	(France) Patrick Pilet (France) Raymond Narac	Porsche M97/74 4.0 L Flat-6	M	115
38 DNF	LMP1	11	(France) Team Oreca Matmut AIM	(France) Olivier Panis (France) Nicolas Lapierre	Courage-Oreca LC70E	M	108
38 DNF	LMP1	11	(France) Team Oreca Matmut AIM	(France) Olivier Panis (France) Nicolas Lapierre	AIM YS5.5 5.5 L V10	M	108
39 DNF	GT2	91	(Germany) FBR	(Italy) Gabrio Rosa (Italy) Giacomo Petrobelli (Italy) Andrea Montermini	Ferrari F430 GT2	M	106
39 DNF	GT2	91	(Germany) FBR	(Italy) Gabrio Rosa (Italy) Giacomo Petrobelli (Italy) Andrea Montermini	Ferrari F136 GT 4.0 L V8	M	106
40 DNF	LMP2	43	(Spain) Q8 Oils Hache Team	(Spain) Máximo Cortés (Italy) Enrico Moncada (Italy) Fabrizio Armetta	Lucchini LMP2/08	D	98
40 DNF	LMP2	43	(Spain) Q8 Oils Hache Team	(Spain) Máximo Cortés (Italy) Enrico Moncada (Italy) Fabrizio Armetta	Judd XV675 3.4 L V8	D	98
41 DNF	LMP2	25	(United Kingdom) RML	(Brazil) Thomas Erdos (United Kingdom) Mike Newton	Lola B08/86	M	82
41 DNF	LMP2	25	(United Kingdom) RML	(Brazil) Thomas Erdos (United Kingdom) Mike Newton	Mazda MZR-R 2.0 L Turbo I4	M	82
42 DNF	LMP2	42	(Italy) Ranieri Randaccio	(Italy) Ranieri Randaccio (Italy) Raffaele Giammaria	Lucchini LMP2/08	D	17
42 DNF	LMP2	42	(Italy) Ranieri Randaccio	(Italy) Ranieri Randaccio (Italy) Raffaele Giammaria	Nicholson-McLaren 3.3 L V8	D	17
43 DNF	GT2	85	(Netherlands) Snoras Spyker Squadron	(Netherlands) Tom Coronel (Switzerland) Benjamin Leuenberger	Spyker C8 Laviolette GT2-R	M	6
43 DNF	GT2	85	(Netherlands) Snoras Spyker Squadron	(Netherlands) Tom Coronel (Switzerland) Benjamin Leuenberger	Audi 4.0 L V8	M	6

Le Mans Series
Previous race: None	2009 season	Next race: 1000 km of Spa
