= Jan Charouz =

Czech motor racing driver

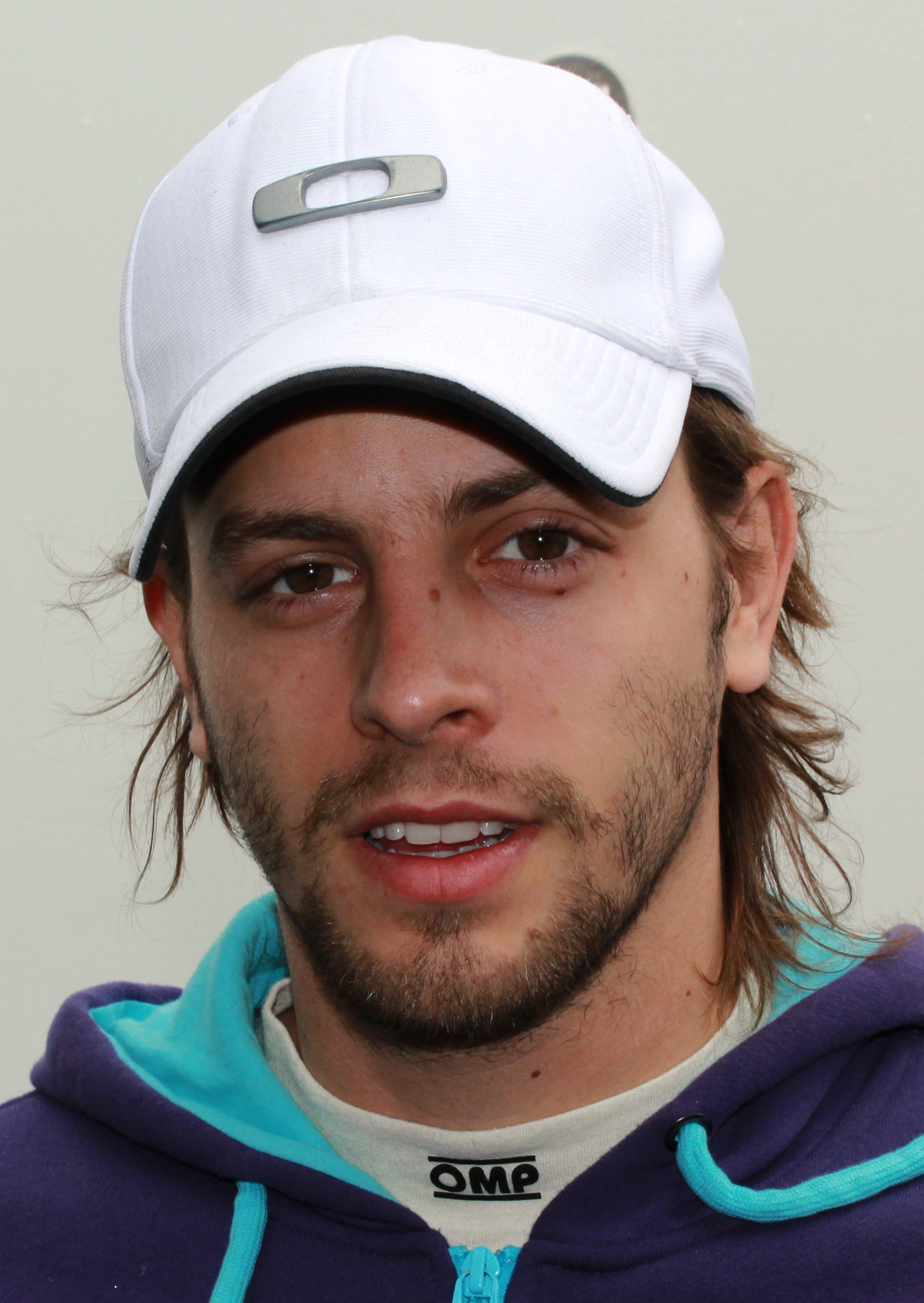
- Jan Charouz at the 2011 Nürburgring World series by Renault round
- Nationality: (Czech Republic) Czech
- Born: 17 July 1987 (age 39) Prague, Czech Republic
- Relatives: Antonín Charouz (father)

Formula Renault 3.5 Series career
- Debut season: 2010
- Categorisation: FIA Gold
- Car number: 6
- Former teams: P1 Motorsport
- Starts: 2
- Wins: 0
- Poles: 0
- Fastest laps: 0

Previous series
- 2007–09 2007 2006 2006 2006 2005–06, 2006–07 2005 2003–04: Le Mans Series; American Le Mans Series; F3000 Int. Masters; Eurocup Mégane Trophy; FIA GT Championship; A1 Grand Prix; Italian Formula 3000; Formula BMW ADAC

Championship titles
- 2009 2006: Le Mans Series – LMP1; F3000 Int. Masters

Jan Charouz (born 17 July 1987) is a Czech former auto racing driver. He won the 2009 Le Mans Series season and 2006 F3000 International Masters season, as well as taking fourth place in the 2009 24 Hours of Le Mans. In 2010 he was the Renault Formula One team reserve driver and has also competed in the World Series by Renault Formula Renault 3.5 Championship and Auto GP.

Charouz is the son of Charouz Racing System founder and team principal Antonín Charouz.

== Open-wheel career ==
=== Formula One ===
==== Renault Team reserve driver ====
For the 2010 season, Charouz became the Renault F1 Team reserve driver. As reserve driver, he participatesdin Renault F1 Team test sessions, and he would be recruited for Grand Prix Friday free practices in official colours of Renault F1 Team. On March 18, 2010, Charouz drove the Renault R29 for the first time in his career during a shakedown at the Silverstone Circuit in Great Britain.

==== HRT Team reserve driver ====
On 16 November 2011, Charouz drove for the HRT F1 Team at the Yas Marina Circuit for the Abu Dhabi young drivers' test. After completing 56 laps (311 km), over four stints, he finished the day in 11th position with a time of 1’46.644. It was later announced, on 24 November, that Charouz would replace Vitantonio Liuzzi for the first practice of the final round of the 2011 F1 season - the Brazilian Grand Prix. The test in Abu Dhabi allowed Charouz to take part in Brazil because it secured him his FIA Super Licence - meaning he could take part in an F1 Grand Prix weekend.

=== World Series by Renault ===
Charouz participated in the 2010 World Series by Renault Formula Renault 3.5 as a member of the P1 Motorsport driver line-up.

=== AutoGP ===
Charouz participated in the 2010 AutoGP championship as the member of Charouz Gravity Racing driver line-up.

== Le Mans Series and 24 Hours of Le Mans ==
Jan Charouz
- Nationality: (Czech Republic) Czech

24 Hours of Le Mans career
- Years: 2007 - 2014
- Teams: Charouz Racing System, Aston Martin Racing, OAK Racing
- Best finish: 4th (2009)
- Class wins: 0

=== 2009 ===
Successful cooperation with factory Aston Martin Racing team continued also in season 2009 and similar programme as in previous two seasons was prepared for Charouz. He participated in complete 2009 Le Mans Series season and 2009 24 Hours of Le Mans however team presented itself with brand new built prototype Aston Martin LMP1. Charouz, together with his teammates Tomáš Enge (CZE) and Stefan Mucke (GER) finished fourth in 24 hours of Le Mans, driving Aston Martin LMP1 No. 007 car. The trio were crowned the 2009 Le Mans Series champions claiming the Team and Driver titles, 50 years on from Aston Martin winning the World Sportscar Championship in 1959 with the DBR1. The No. 007 LMP1 car of Charouz, Enge and Mucke recording five podium finishes (including two wins at Barcelona and Nürburgring) from five races.

== Racing record ==
=== Career summary ===
Season	Series	Team	Races	Wins	Poles	F/Laps	Podiums	Points	Position
2003	Formula BMW ADAC	I.S.R.	16	0	0	1	0	0	30th
2004	Formula BMW ADAC	Team Rosberg	20	0	0	0	0	3	21st
2005	Italian Formula 3000 Championship	Ma-Con Engineering	6	0	0	0	0	10	11th
2005–06	A1 Grand Prix	A1 Team Czech Republic	2	0	0	0	0	56‡	12th‡
2006	F3000 International Masters	Charouz Racing System	15	2	0	0	8	75	**1st**
2006	Eurocup Mégane Trophy	Racing for Belgium	2	0	0	0	0	3	25th
2006	FIA GT Championship - GT1	Zakspeed Racing	1	0	0	0	0	8	22nd
2006–07	A1 Grand Prix	A1 Team Czech Republic	2	0	0	0	0	27‡	12th‡
2007	Le Mans Series	Charouz Racing System	5	0	0	?	1	15	10th
2007	24 Hours of Le Mans	Charouz Racing System	1	0	0	0	0	N/A	8th
2007	American Le Mans Series - LMP2	Zytek Motorsports	1	0	0	0	1	19	23rd
2008	Le Mans Series	Charouz Racing System	5	0	0	0	2	19	9th
2008	24 Hours of Le Mans	Charouz Racing System	1	0	0	0	0	N/A	9th
2009	Le Mans Series	AMR Eastern Europe	5	2	0	0	5	39	**1st**
2009	24h Le Mans	AMR Eastern Europe	1	0	0	0	0	N/A	4th
2010	Formula Renault 3.5 Series	P1 Motorsport	15	0	0	0	0	16	18th
2010	Auto GP	Charouz-Gravity Racing	12	0	0	0	4	36	4th
2010	24 Hours of Le Mans - LMP2	OAK Racing	1	0	0	0	1	N/A	**2nd**
2010	Formula One	Renault F1 Team	Test driver						
2011	Formula Renault 3.5 Series	Gravity-Charouz Racing	17	0	0	1	0	10	25th
2011	GP2 Final	Carlin	2	0	0	0	0	0	25th
2011	24 Hours of Le Mans - LMP2	OAK Racing	1	0	0	0	0	N/A	5th
2011	Formula One	Lotus Renault GP	Test driver						
2011	Formula One	HRT Formula 1 Team	Test driver						
2012	FIA World Endurance Championship	ADR-Delta	3	0	0	0	0	7.5	32nd
2012	FIA World Endurance Championship	Lotus	1	0	0	0	0	7.5	32nd
2012	24 Hours of Le Mans - LMP2	ADR-Delta	1	0	0	1	0	N/A	6th
2013	FIA World Endurance Championship - LMP2	Lotus	8	0	0	0	1	33	8th
2013	24 Hours of Le Mans - LMP2	Lotus	1	0	0	0	0	N/A	DNF
2013	Supercar Challenge Superlights - PR1	Praga Racing Slovakia	2	1	0	1	2	39	5th
2013	Rolex Sports Car Series - DP	Starworks Motorsport	1	0	0	0	0	17	45th
2014	European Le Mans Series	Sébastien Loeb Racing	2	0	0	0	1	24	11th
2014	24 Hours of Le Mans - LMP2	Sébastien Loeb Racing	1	0	0	0	0	N/A	4th

^{‡} Includes points scored by other A1 Team Czech Republic drivers.

=== Complete Formula BMW ADAC results ===
(key)

Year	Entrant	1	2	3	4	5	6	7	8	9	10	11	12	13	14	15	16	17	18	19	20	Pos	Points
2003	Igor Salaquarda Racing	HOC1; 1; 22	HOC1; 2; 26	ADR; 1	ADR; 2	NÜR1; 1	NÜR1; 2	LAU; 1; 20	LAU; 2; 24	NOR; 1; 23	NOR; 2 Ret	NÜR2; 1; 19	NÜR2; 2; 13	NÜR3; 1; 25	NÜR3; 2; 18	A1R; 1; 16	A1R; 2; 21	ZAN; 1 Ret	ZAN; 2; 17	HOC2; 1; 13	HOC2; 2; 16	30th	0
2004	Team Rosberg	HOC1; 1; 10	HOC1; 2; 9	ADR; 1; 13	ADR; 2; 13	NÜR1; 1; 20†	NÜR1; 2 Ret	LAU; 1; 14	LAU; 2; 15	NOR; 1; 13	NOR; 2; 11	NÜR2; 1; 26	NÜR2; 2; 12	OSC; 1; 24	OSC; 2; 11	ZAN; 1 Ret	ZAN; 2 Ret	BRN; 1; 12	BRN; 2; 11	HOC2; 1; 12	HOC2; 2 Ret	21st	3

=== Complete Italian Formula 3000 Championship results ===
(key) (Races in bold indicate pole position; races in italics indicate fastest lap)

Year	Entrant	1	2	3	4	5	6	7	8	DC	Points
2005	Ma-Con Engineering	ADR; 6	VAL; 6	CHE; 10	MON; 5	MUG; 9	MAG; 11	MOZ	MIS	11th	10

=== Complete A1 Grand Prix results ===
(key)

Year	Entrant	1	2	3	4	5	6	7	8	9	10	11	12	13	14	15	16	17	18	19	20	21	22	DC	Points
2005–06	Czech Republic	GBR; SPR; 18	GBR; FEA; Ret	GER; SPR	GER; FEA	POR; SPR	POR; FEA	AUS; SPR; PO	AUS; FEA; PO	MYS; SPR	MYS; FEA	UAE; SPR	UAE; FEA	RSA; SPR	RSA; FEA	IDN; SPR	IDN; FEA	MEX; SPR	MEX; FEA	USA; SPR	USA; FEA	CHN; SPR	CHN; FEA	12th	56
2006–07	Czech Republic	NED; SPR; PO	NED; FEA; PO	CZE; SPR	CZE; FEA	CHN; SPR	CHN; FEA	MYS; SPR	MYS; FEA	IDN; SPR	IDN; FEA	NZL; SPR	NZL; FEA	AUS; SPR	AUS; FEA	RSA; SPR	RSA; FEA	MEX; SPR	MEX; FEA	CHN; SPR	CHN; FEA	GBR; SPR; 13	GBR; FEA; 15	12th	27

=== Complete F3000 International Masters results ===
(key) (Races in bold indicate pole position; races in italics indicate fastest lap)

Year	Entrant	1	2	3	4	5	6	7	8	9	10	11	12	13	14	15	16	DC	Points
2006	Charouz Racing System	MNZ; 1; 2	MNZ; 2; 3	MAG; 1; 7	MAG; 2; 9	BRH; 1; 3	BRH; 2; 2	OSC; 1; 5	OSC; 2; 4	BRN; 1; 2	BRN; 2; 1	IST; 1; 7	**IST**; **2**; 1	EST; 1 Ret	EST; 2 Ret	EST; 3; 3	EST; 4 C	**1st**	**75**

=== Complete European Le Mans Series results ===
Year	Entrant	Class	Chassis	Engine	1	2	3	4	5	6	Rank	Points
2007	Charouz Racing System	LMP1	Lola B07/17	Judd GV5.5 S2 5.5 L V10	MNZ; 9	VAL; 2	NUR; 4	SPA; 7	SIL; NC	MIL	10th	15
2008	Charouz Racing System	LMP1	Lola B08/60	Aston Martin 6.0 L V12	CAT; 3	MNZ; 8	SPA; 10	NUR; 5	SIL; 2		9th	19
2009	AMR Eastern Europe	LMP1	Lola-Aston Martin B09/60	Aston Martin 6.0 L V12	CAT; 1	SPA; 3	ALG; 2	NUR; 1	SIL; 3		1st	39
2014	Sébastien Loeb Racing	LMP2	Sébastien Loeb Racing	Nissan VK45DE 4.5 L V8	SIL; 7	IMO; 2	RED	PLR	EST		11th	24

=== 24 Hours of Le Mans results ===
Year	Team	Co-Drivers	Car	Class	Laps	Pos.	Class Pos.
2007	(Czech Republic) Charouz Racing System	(Germany) Stefan Mücke (Malaysia) Alex Yoong	Lola B07/17-Judd	LMP1	338	8th	5th
2008	(Czech Republic) Charouz Racing System (United Kingdom) Aston Martin Racing	(Czech Republic) Tomáš Enge (Germany) Stefan Mücke	Lola B08/60-Aston Martin	LMP1	354	9th	9th
2009	(Czech Republic) AMR Eastern Europe	(Czech Republic) Tomáš Enge (Germany) Stefan Mücke	Lola-Aston Martin B09/60	LMP1	373	4th	4th
2010	(France) OAK Racing	(France) Matthieu Lahaye (France) Guillaume Moreau	Pescarolo 01-Judd	LMP2	361	7th	**2nd**
2011	(France) OAK Racing	(Japan) Shinji Nakano (Belgium) Nicolas de Crem	OAK Pescarolo 01 Evo-Judd	LMP2	313	14th	5th
2012	(United Kingdom) ADR-Delta	(Australia) John Martin (Thailand) Tor Graves	Oreca 03-Nissan	LMP2	346	13th	6th
2013	(Czech Republic) Lotus	(Germany) Thomas Holzer (Austria) Dominik Kraihamer	Lotus T128-Praga	LMP2	219	DNF	DNF
2014	(France) Sébastien Loeb Racing	(Germany) René Rast (France) Vincent Capillaire	Oreca 03R-Nissan	LMP2	354	8th	4th

=== Complete Formula Renault 3.5 Series results ===
(key) (Races in bold indicate pole position) (Races in italics indicate fastest lap)

Year	Team	1	2	3	4	5	6	7	8	9	10	11	12	13	14	15	16	17	Pos	Points
2010	P1 Motorsport	ALC; 1 Ret	ALC; 2 DSQ	SPA; 1; 8	SPA; 2; 9	MON; 1; 14	BRN; 1; 7	BRN; 2; 11	MAG; 1; 20	MAG; 2; 17	HUN; 1; 7	HUN; 2; 21	HOC; 1 Ret	HOC; 2; 15	SIL; 1	SIL; 2	CAT; 1 Ret	CAT; 2; 8	18th	16
2011	Gravity–Charouz Racing	ALC; 1; 17	ALC; 2; 22	SPA; 1; 8	SPA; 2; 20	MNZ; 1; 12	MNZ; 2; 12	MON; 1 Ret	NÜR; 1; 21	NÜR; 2; 17	HUN; 1 Ret	HUN; 2; 21	SIL; 1; 14	SIL; 2; 9	LEC; 1 Ret	LEC; 2 Ret	CAT; 1; 8	CAT; 2 Ret	25th	10

=== Complete Auto GP Series results ===
(key) (Races in bold indicate pole position) (Races in italics indicate fastest lap)

Year	Team	1	2	3	4	5	6	7	8	9	10	11	12	Pos	Points
2010	Charouz-Gravity Racing	BRN; 1; 4	BRN; 2; 6	IMO; 1 Ret	IMO; 2; 6	SPA; 1; 5	SPA; 2; 3	MAG; 1; 5	MAG; 2; 2	NAV; 1; 9	NAV; 2; 3	MNZ; 1; 6	MNZ; 2; 2	4th	36

=== Complete GP2 Final results ===
(key) (Races in bold indicate pole position) (Races in italics indicate fastest lap)

Year	Entrant	1	2	DC	Points
2011	Carlin	YMC; FEA; Ret	YMC; SPR; 17	25th	0

=== Complete Formula One participations ===
(key) (Races in bold indicate pole position) (Races in italics indicate fastest lap)

Year	Entrant	Chassis	Engine	1	2	3	4	5	6	7	8	9	10	11	12	13	14	15	16	17	18	19	WDC	Points
2011	HRT Formula 1 Team	Hispania F111	Cosworth CA2011 2.4 V8	AUS	MAL	CHN	TUR	ESP	MON	CAN	EUR	GBR	GER	HUN	BEL	ITA	SIN	JPN	KOR	IND	ABU	BRA; TD	–	–

== Gallery ==
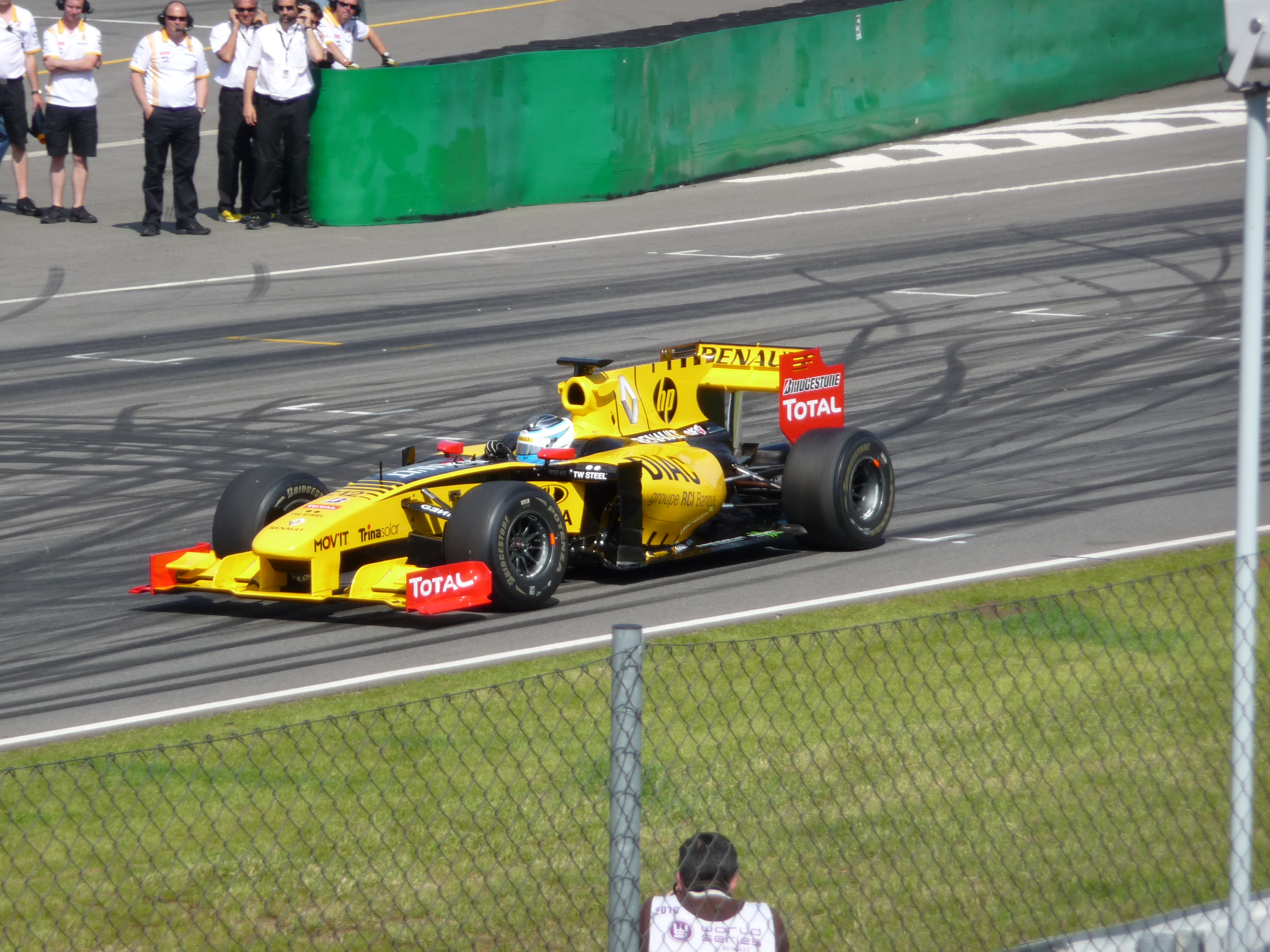
Charouz driving the Formula One Renault R29 during an exhibition at Masaryk Circuit in 2010.

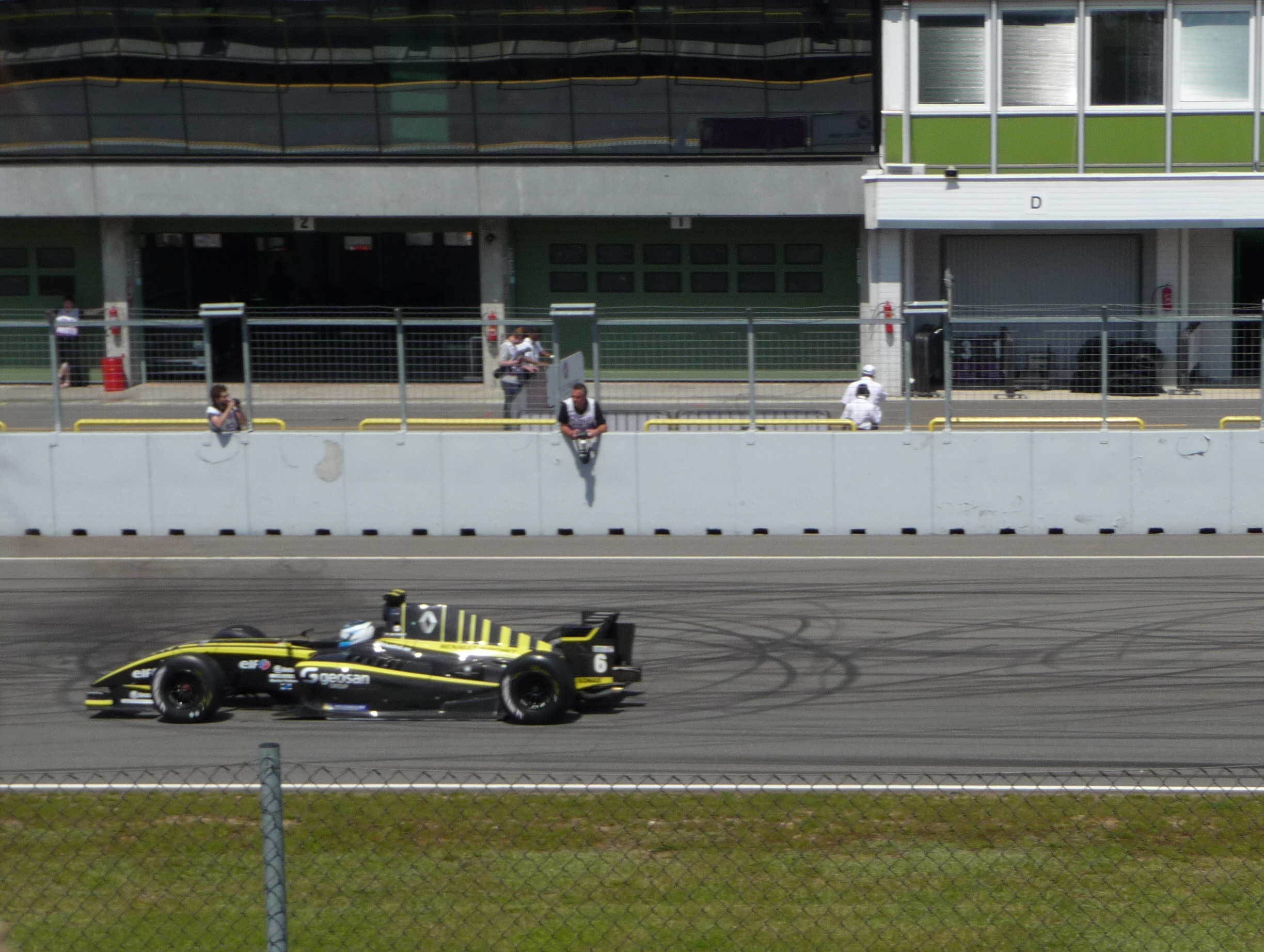
Charouz in the second race of the 2010 Formula Renault 3.5 Series season at Brno.

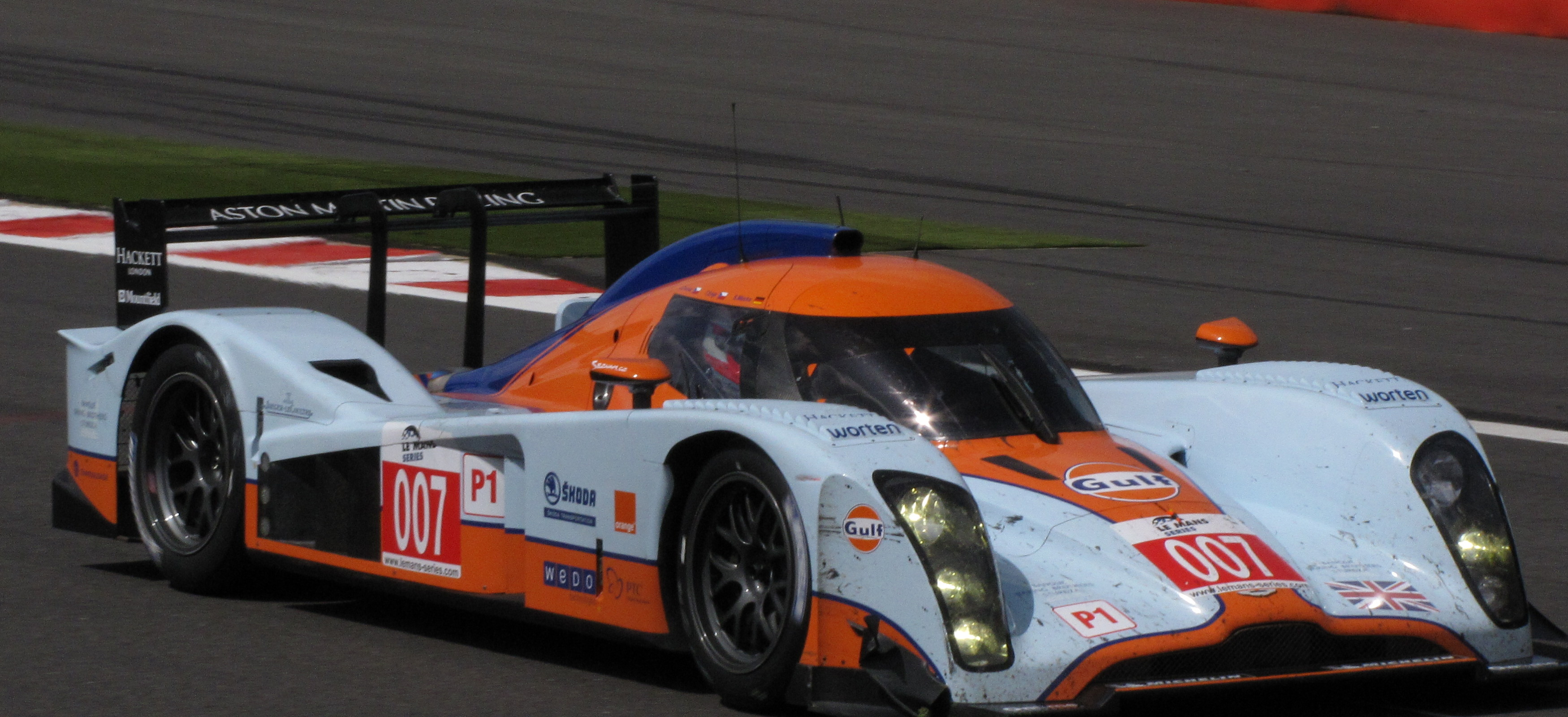
Charouz driving a Lola-Aston Martin DBR1-2 in the 2009 1000 km of Spa.

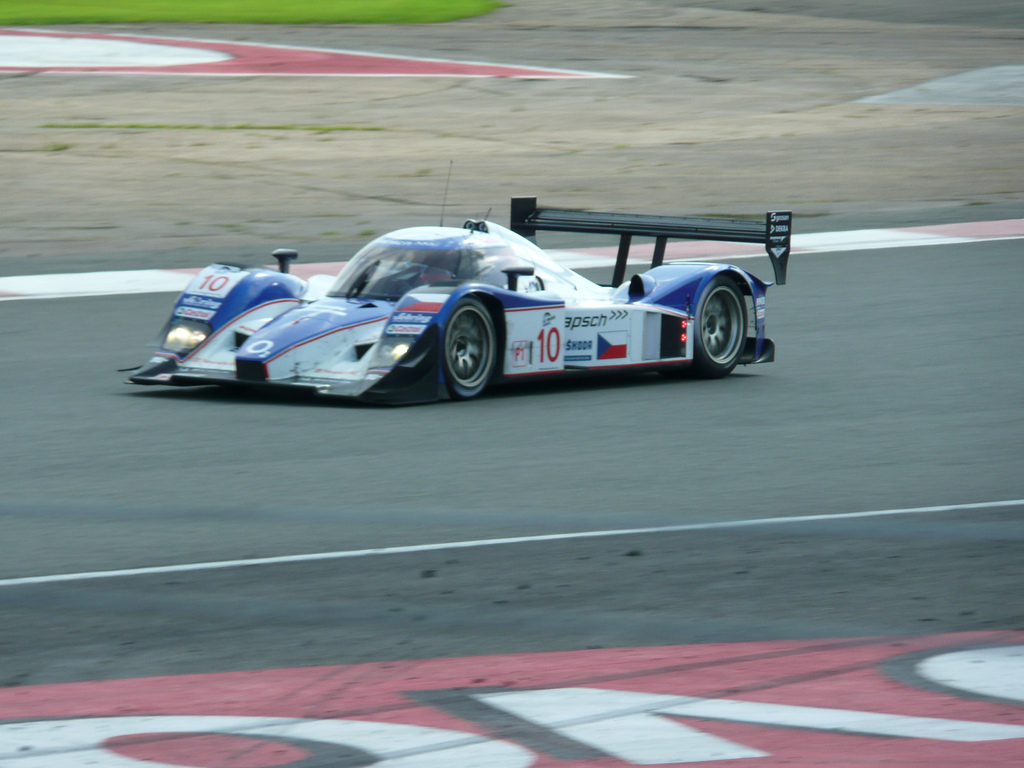
Charouz driving the Charouz Racing System Lola B08/60 Aston Martin V12 in the 2008 1000km of Silverstone

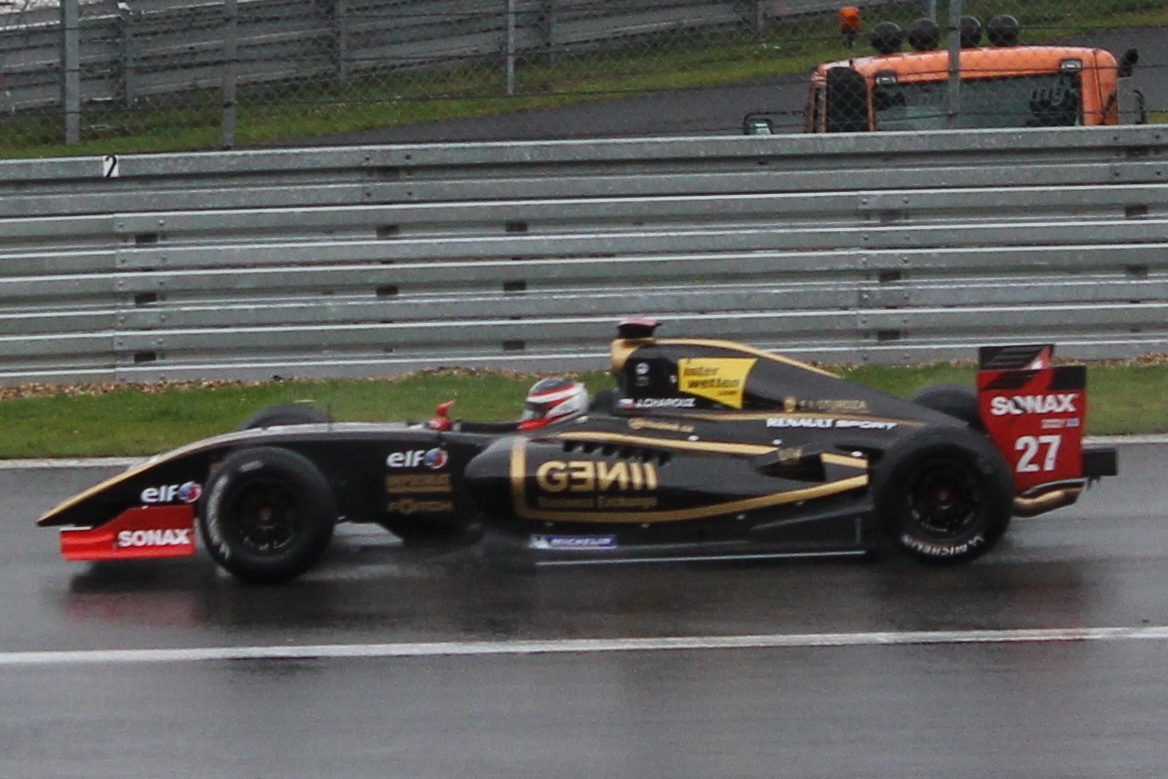
Charouz at the 2011 Nürburgring World series by Renault round

Sporting positions
Preceded by Max Busnelli; Norbert Siedler	F3000 International Masters champion 2006	Succeeded by Jérôme d'Ambrosio
Preceded by Alexandre Prémat; Mike Rockenfeller	Le Mans Series Champion; 2009 with: Tomáš Enge; Stefan Mücke	Succeeded by Stéphane Sarrazin
