= Ginetta-Zytek 09S =

Ginetta-Zytek 09S (Zytek 09S)
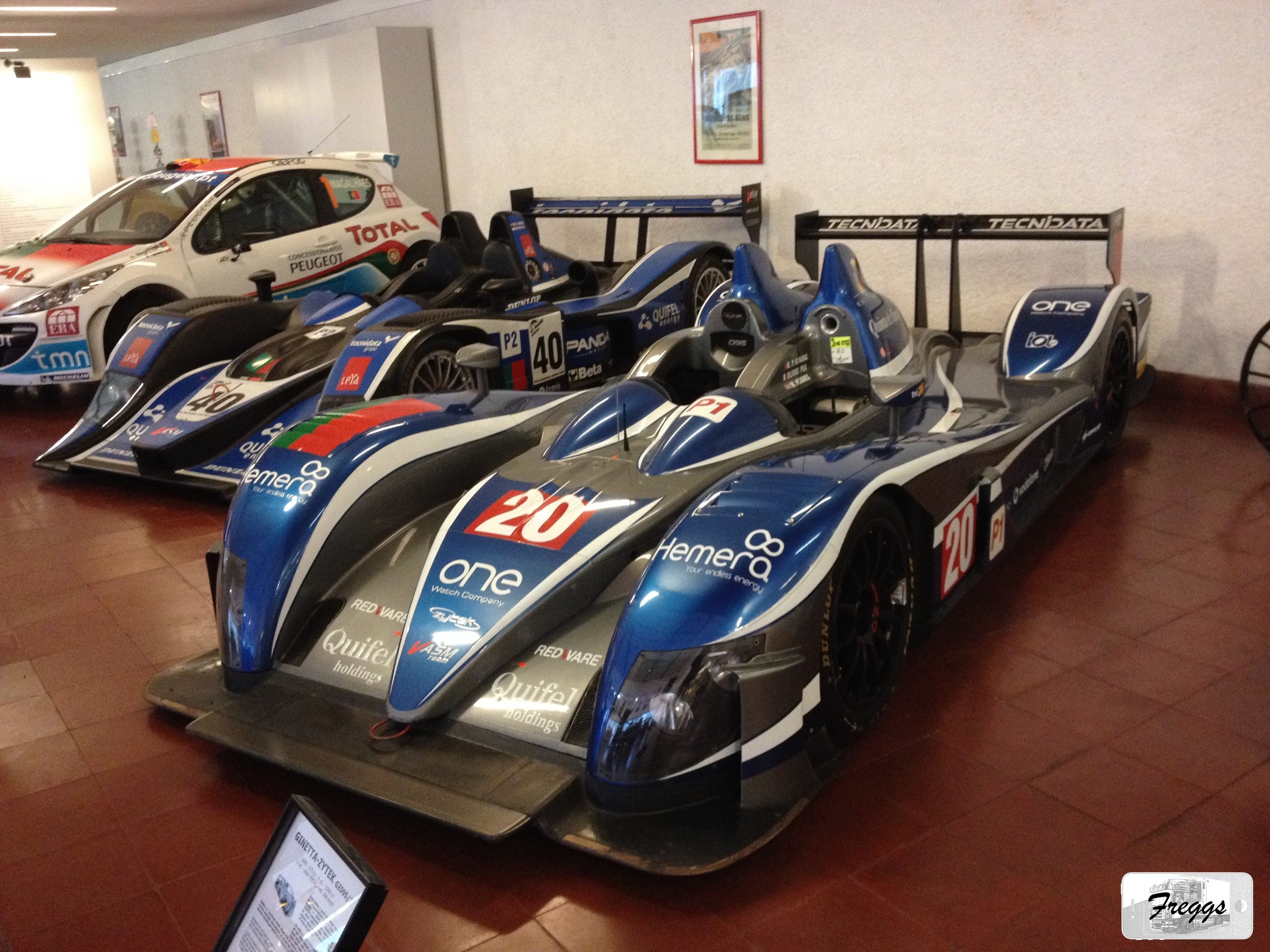
- Category: LMP1
- Constructor: Zytek Engineering

Technical specifications
- Chassis: Carbon-fibre monocoque
- Suspension (front): Independent double wishbone pushrod-actuated coil springs over shock absorbers
- Suspension (rear): Independent double wishbone pushrod-actuated coil springs over shock absorbers
- Length: 4,561 mm (180 in)
- Axle track: 1,618 mm (64 in)/1,556 mm (61 in) front/rear
- Wheelbase: 2,815 mm (111 in)
- Engine: Zytek ZJ458 4,500 cc (274.6 cu in) V8 naturally aspirated mid-mounted, longitudinally mounted
- Transmission: Ricardo 6-speed semi-automatic
- Weight: 900 kg (1,984.2 lb)
- Tyres: Michelin; Dunlop

Competition history
- Teams' Championships: 0

The Ginetta-Zytek 09S, also known simply as the Zytek 09S, was a sports prototype race car, developed by Zytek Engineering as a Le Mans Prototype, following their partial merger with Ginetta, in 2009. It was built and designed complying with LMP1 rules and regulations, and is a direct evolution of the Ginetta-Zytek GZ09S.
