= Ginetta-Zytek GZ09S =

Le Mans racing car

The Ginetta-Zytek GZ09S was a LMP1-class Le Mans Prototype race car, built by Zytek Engineering following their partial merger with Ginetta. It was an evolutionary update of the Zytek 07S, with the bodywork altered for the 2009 LMP regulations. The GZ09S/2 was a LMP2-class version of the same car (for 2011, it became a LMP1-class car, due to rule changes, and became known as the Zytek 09SC.) In 2011, its successor, the Nissan-engined Zytek Z11SN, made its competitive debut, following the latest rule changes to the LMP regulations. The GZ09S was retired at the end of that season, as it was no longer eligible to compete.

== GZ09S ==
Ginetta-Zytek GZ09S
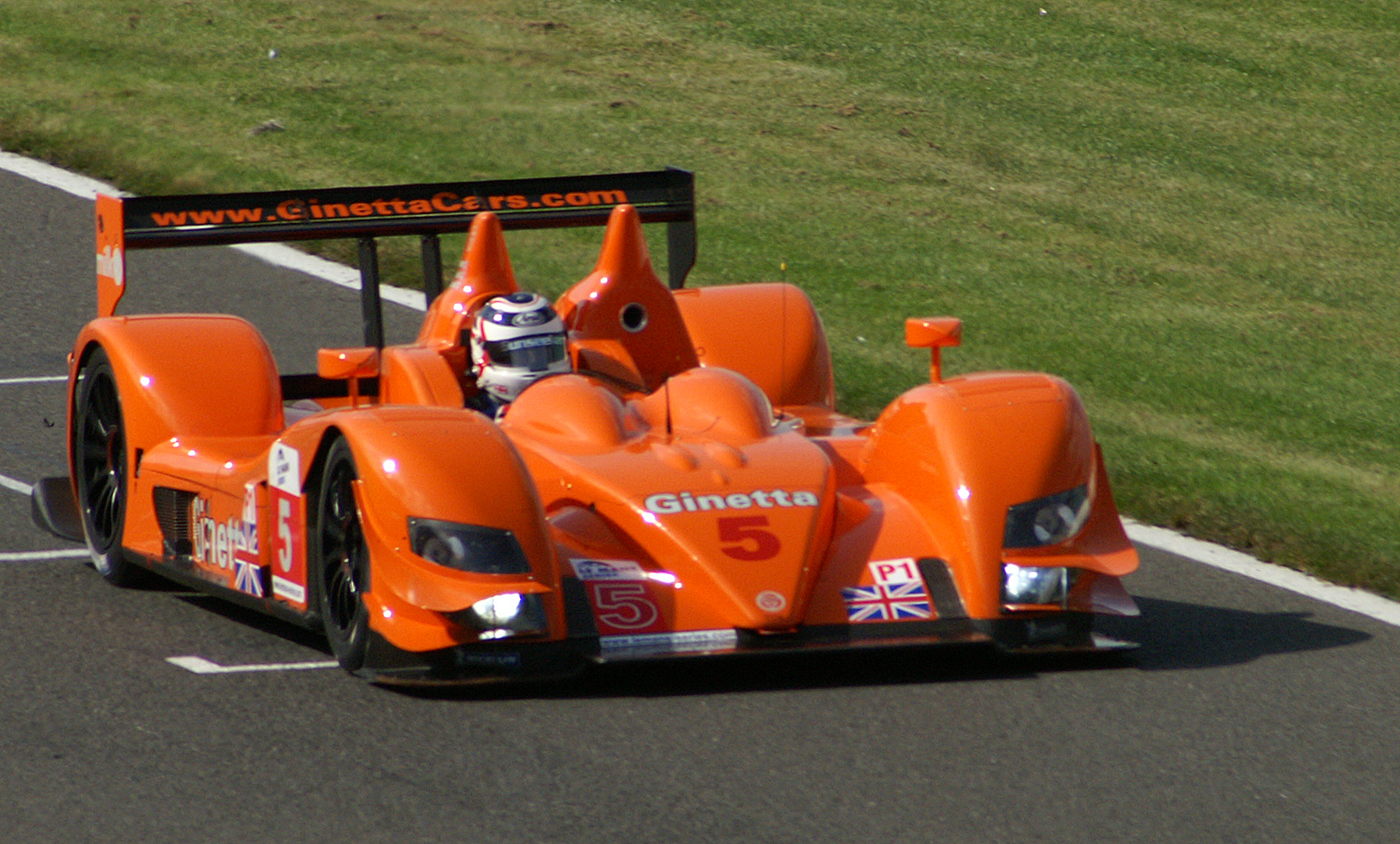
- Category: LMP1
- Constructor: Zytek Engineering
- Predecessor: Zytek 07S
- Successor: Zytek 09S (Note: Following the LMP rule changes for 2011, the Ginetta-Zytek GZ09S/2 became the Zytek 09S, and was promoted from the LMP2 category into the LMP1 category; thus, the 09S replaced the GZ09S. The GZ09S/2 was replaced in the LMP2 category by the Zytek Z11SN.)

Technical specifications
- Chassis: Carbon-fibre monocoque
- Suspension (front): Independent double wishbone pushrod system with horizontal spring/damper unit
- Suspension (rear): Independent double wishbone pushrod system with horizontal spring/damper unit
- Length: 4,561 mm (180 in)
- Axle track: 1,618 mm (64 in)/1,556 mm (61 in) front/rear
- Wheelbase: 2,815 mm (111 in)
- Engine: Zytek ZJ458 4,500 cc (274.6 cu in) V8 naturally aspirated mid-mounted, longitudinally mounted
- Transmission: Ricardo 6-speed semi-automatic
- Weight: 900 kg (1,984.2 lb)
- Tyres: Michelin

Competition history
- Notable entrants: Strakka Racing (2009); Team LNT (2009-2010); Corsa Motorsports (2009); Beechdean-Mansell Motorsport (2010)
- Debut: 2009 1000 km of Catalunya
- Teams' Championships: 0

The GZ09S used a 4.5-litre, 635 hp (474 kW; 644 PS) Zytek ZJ458 naturally-aspirated V8 engine. It was designed for the new LMP1 regulations that were announced for the 2009 24 Hours of Le Mans, and it was an evolutionary update of the Zytek 07S. For 2009, it was announced that Strakka Racing would be moving up into the LMP1 class for the first time, entering a GZ09S, at both that year's Le Mans Series, and the 24 Hours of Le Mans. Danny Watts gained his first pole at the 1000 km of Catalunya, the first event of the season, and the car's debut event, before eventually finishing fifth. The team managed to finish 14th in class at Le Mans, but the Team LNT entry failed to finish due to a fuel line rupturing. ALMS team Corsa Motorsports entered a hybrid version of the GZ09S at the 2009 Northeast Grand Prix, the first time a hybrid car had ever been run in the series. The hybrid's debut proved to be a successful one: the team finished third overall, running reliably throughout the race, to the surprise of its drivers Johnny Mowlem and Stefan Johansson. Corsa Motorsports entered four other events that season, with the team being the only ALMS team to utilize the GZ09S. The list of Ginetta-Zyteks was further expanded when former Formula 1 world champion Nigel Mansell announced he was entering the 1000 km of Silverstone, the final race of the 2009 LMS season. It would not prove to be a successful event for Mansell, as his team finished 28th overall, last of the LMP1 cars to be classified.

For 2010, Beechdean-Mansell Motorsport and LNT were the only teams to enter the GZ09S in the Le Mans Series. Mansell took a class victory, and seventh overall, at the 1000 km of Hungaroring, a race notable for the top six places being filled solely with LMP2 cars, due to the top category's entrants (including the Mansell team) experiencing a variety of misfortunes. Mansell, partnered by his sons Leo and Greg, was the only GZ09S entry in the 2010 24 Hours of Le Mans, with Nigel making his debut at the event. It would not, however, prove to be a successful one: Nigel lasted just 17 minutes, before a puncture caused him to crash heavily at Mulsanne corner, and the first team with a father and two sons in Le Mans history was forced to withdraw. The team folded soon after the end of the season. Although still technically eligible to compete, the car was essentially made obsolete by the new LMP1 regulations for 2011, and thus did not appear again.

== GZ09S/2 ==
Ginetta-Zytek GZ09S/2
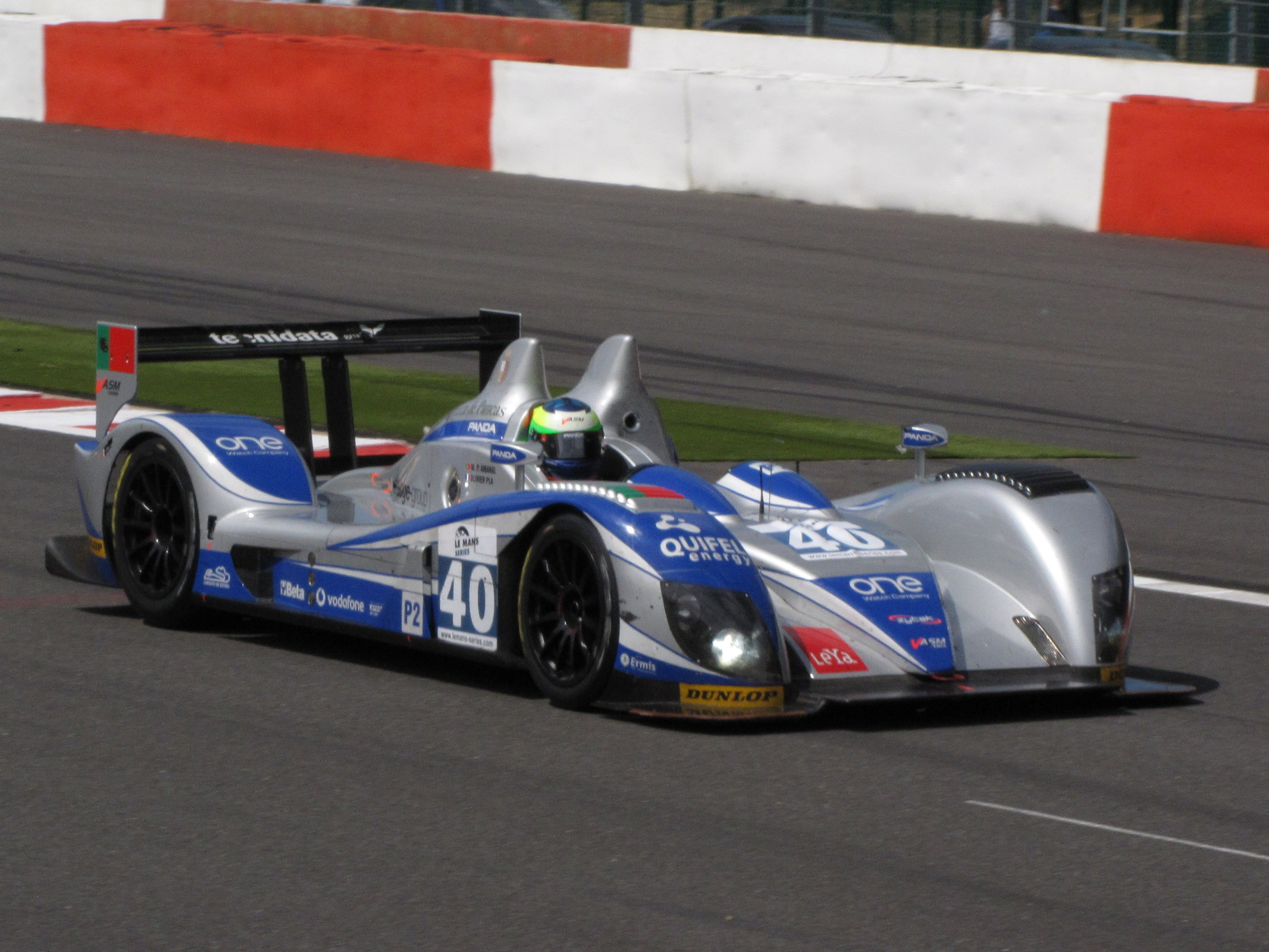
- Category: LMP2
- Constructor: Zytek Engineering
- Predecessor: Zytek 07S/2
- Successor: Zytek Z11SN

Technical specifications
- Chassis: Carbon-fibre monocoque
- Suspension (front): Independent double wishbone pushrod system with horizontal spring/damper unit
- Suspension (rear): Independent double wishbone pushrod system with horizontal spring/damper unit
- Length: 4,561 mm (180 in)
- Axle track: 1,618 mm (64 in)/1,556 mm (61 in) front/rear
- Wheelbase: 2,815 mm (111 in)
- Engine: Zytek ZG348 (GZ09S/2) 3,396 cc (207.2 cu in) (GZ09S/2) V8 naturally aspirated mid-mounted, longitudinally mounted
- Transmission: Ricardo 6-speed semi-automatic
- Weight: 825 kg (1,818.8 lb)
- Tyres: Dunlop

Competition history
- Notable entrants: Quifel ASM Team (2009-2011); GAC Racing Team (2009); Barazi-Epsilon (2009); Team Bruichladdich (2010); MIK Corse (2011)
- Debut: 2009 1000 km of Catalunya
- Teams' Championships: 1 (2009 LMS, LMP2 class)

The GZ09S/2 used a 3.4-litre, 475 hp (354 kW; 482 PS) Zytek ZG348 naturally-aspirated V8 engine. It was designed for the new LMP2 regulations that were announced for the 2009 24 Hours of Le Mans, and it was an evolutionary update of the Zytek 07S. Towards the end of 2008, it was announced that Quifel ASM Team would be the first team to buy a GZ09S/2, with the intention of entering it in the Le Mans Series, and the 24 Hours of Le Mans. GAC Racing Team and Barazi-Epsilon also entered GZ09S/2s in the 24 Hours of Le Mans in 2009, with the latter team finishing fourth in class, being the sole remaining LMP2 Ginetta-Zytek at the finish. The partnership of Miguel Amaral and Olivier Pla, driving for Quifel ASM Team, took the LMP2 class title in the LMS, with 33 points, nine points ahead of the runner up, following back-to-back class victories at the 1000 km of Algarve, and the 1000 km of Nürburgring.

For the 2010 LMS season, Quifel ASM Team retained their GZ09S/2, whilst Team Bruichladdich also ran one of the cars for the first time, whilst both teams also appeared at that year's 24 Hours of Le Mans, with Bruichladdich finishing highest, managing tenth overall, and fifth in class. Despite the reasonably successful 24 Hours of Le Mans result, the LMS season would not be as successful as the previous year's – Team Bruichladdich finished fifth, with Quifel ASM Team finishing sixth overall, although Quifel ASM had taken a class victory at the 1000 km of Spa.

Following the rule changes prior to the 2011 LMS season, the GZ09S/2 was moved into the LMP1 category, and became known as the Zytek 09SC, whilst Zytek released the Nissan-engined Zytek Z11SN to compete in the LMP2 category. Quifel-ASM Team entered the first two rounds of the season, whilst MIK Corse entered the hybrid version of the car in the second and third rounds of the season; however, neither team had any major success, with Quifel-ASM's fourth in class, and eighth overall, at the 6 Hours of Castellet, being the car's best result of the season, whilst the MIK Corse-entered car was badly damaged at the 6 Hours of Silverstone. Quifel-ASM Team also entered the 2011 24 Hours of Le Mans, but retired after 48 laps. Following this race, Quifel-ASM initially withdrew from the 6 Hours of Imola, but then withdrew from the entire series, citing engine reliability issues as their reason for withdrawal. The Le Mans race would prove to be the car's last outing, as it did not appear in the 2012 24 Hours of Le Mans, and the 2012 ELMS no longer accepted LMP1-class entries.
