= Zytek ZJ458 engine =

Zytek ZJ458

Overview
- Manufacturer: (United Kingdom) Zytek
- Production: 2009-2011

Layout
- Configuration: 90° V8 naturally-aspirated
- Displacement: 4.5 L (275 cu in)
- Valvetrain: DOHC

RPM range
- Max. engine speed: 10,000 rpm

Combustion
- Fuel system: Electronic indirect multi-point injection
- Fuel type: Elf LMS 102 RON unleaded Petrol; E10 Ethanol

Output
- Power output: 635–700 hp (474–522 kW) @ 9,000 rpm
- Torque output: 590 N⋅m (435 lb⋅ft) @ 7,500 rpm

Dimensions
- Dry weight: 119 kg (262 lb)

The Zytek ZJ458 engine is a 4.5-litre, normally-aspirated, V8 racing engine, developed and produced by Zytek for sports car racing. The ZJ458's rev-limit was about 10,000 rpm, and produces its power output of 635–700 hp (474–522 kW) at 9,000 rpm, and peak torque of 590 N⋅m (435 lb⋅ft) @ 7,500 rpm.

== Applications ==
- Ginetta-Zytek GZ09S
- Zytek Z11SN
