= 2014 4 Hours of Imola =

Autodromo Enzo e Dino Ferrari

The 2014 4 Hours of Imola was an endurance motor race held at the Autodromo Enzo e Dino Ferrari near Imola, Italy on 17 and 18 May 2014, and served as the second round of the 2014 European Le Mans Series.

Car no. 38 driven by Simon Dolan, Harry Tincknell and Filipe Albuquerque won the race overall for Jota Sport, ahead of Sébastien Loeb Racing's Vincent Capillaire and Jan Charouz and Signatech Alpine's Paul-Loup Chatin, Nelson Panciatici and Oliver Webb.

The LMGTE category was led by SMP Racing's trio, Andrea Bertolini, Viktor Shaitar and Sergey Zlobin, while Formula Racing's Johnny Laursen, Mikkel Mac and Andrea Piccini were victorious in the GTC class.

== Qualifying ==
=== Qualifying result ===
Pole positions in each class are denoted in bold.

Pos.	Class	No.	Team	Time	Gap
1	**LMP2**	**38**	(United Kingdom) **Jota Sport**	**1:33.974**	—
2	LMP2	46	(France) Thiriet by TDS Racing	1:34.658	+0.684
3	LMP2	36	(France) Signatech Alpine	1:34.861	+0.887
4	LMP2	48	(Republic of Ireland) Murphy Prototypes	1:34.882	+0.908
5	LMP2	43	(Switzerland) Newblood by Morand Racing	1:35.593	+1.619
6	LMP2	34	(Switzerland) Race Performance	1:35.649	+1.675
7	LMP2	41	(United Kingdom) Greaves Motorsport	1:35.798	+1.824
8	LMP2	29	(Germany) Pegasus Racing	1:36.330	+2.356
9	LMP2	24	(France) Sébastien Loeb Racing	1:36.447	+2.473
10	**LMGTE**	**81**	(Switzerland) **Kessel Racing**	**1:39.920**	**+5.946**
11	LMGTE	72	(Russia) SMP Racing	1:40.221	+6.247
12	LMGTE	54	(Italy) AF Corse	1:40.550	+6.576
13	LMGTE	80	(Switzerland) Kessel Racing	1:40.750	+6.776
14	LMGTE	55	(Italy) AF Corse	1:40.852	+6.878
15	LMGTE	56	(Austria) AT Racing	1:41.026	+7.052
16	LMGTE	65	(Italy) AF Corse	1:41.202	+7.228
17	LMGTE	66	(United Kingdom) JMW Motorsport	1:41.319	+7.345
18	LMGTE	58	(France) Team Sofrev-ASP	1:41.592	+7.618
19	**GTC**	**60**	(Denmark) **Formula Racing**	**1:42.082**	**+8.108**
20	LMGTE	86	(United Kingdom) Gulf Racing UK	1:42.145	+8.171
21	LMGTE	76	(France) IMSA Performance Matmut	1:42.207	+8.233
22	LMGTE	85	(United Kingdom) Gulf Racing UK	1:42.377	+8.403
23	GTC	95	(Italy) AF Corse	1:42.145	+8.171
24	LMGTE	82	(France) Crubile Sport	1:42.670	+8.696
25	GTC	71	(Russia) SMP Racing	1:42.691	+8.717
26	GTC	98	(France) ART Grand Prix	1:42.696	+8.722
27	GTC	73	(Russia) SMP Racing	1:42.750	+8.776
28	GTC	93	(France) Pro GT by Almeras	1:42.808	+8.834
29	GTC	94	(Italy) AF Corse	1:42.926	+8.952
30	GTC	99	(France) ART Grand Prix	1:42.994	+9.020
31	GTC	57	(Russia) SMP Racing	1:43.028	+9.054
32	LMGTE	67	(France) IMSA Performance Matmut	1:43.099	+9.125
33	GTC	75	(Belgium) Prospeed Competition	1:43.488	+9.514
34	GTC	78	Team Russia by Barwell	1:43.642	+9.668
35	GTC	63	(Italy) AF Corse	1:46.202	+12.228
36	GTC	59	(France) Team Sofrev-ASP	1:46.950	+12.976
37	GTC	62	(Italy) AF Corse	No time set	

== Race ==
=== Race result ===
Class winners in bold.

Pos	Class	No	Team	Drivers	Chassis	Tyre	Laps	Gap/Retired
Pos	Class	No	Team	Drivers	Engine	Tyre	Laps	Gap/Retired
1	**LMP2**	**38**	**(United Kingdom) Jota Sport**	**(United Kingdom) Simon Dolan (United Kingdom) Harry Tincknell (Portugal) Filipe Albuquerque**	**Zytek Z11SN**	D	**139**	**4:00:04.690**
1	**LMP2**	**38**	**(United Kingdom) Jota Sport**	**(United Kingdom) Simon Dolan (United Kingdom) Harry Tincknell (Portugal) Filipe Albuquerque**	**Nissan VK45DE 4.5 L V8**	D	**139**	**4:00:04.690**
2	LMP2	24	(France) Sébastien Loeb Racing	(France) Vincent Capillaire (Czech Republic) Jan Charouz	Oreca 03	M	139	+28.869
2	LMP2	24	(France) Sébastien Loeb Racing	(France) Vincent Capillaire (Czech Republic) Jan Charouz	Nissan VK45DE 4.5 L V8	M	139	+28.869
3	LMP2	36	(France) Signatech Alpine	(France) Paul-Loup Chatin (France) Nelson Panciatici (United Kingdom) Oliver Webb	Alpine A450	M	139	+42.679
3	LMP2	36	(France) Signatech Alpine	(France) Paul-Loup Chatin (France) Nelson Panciatici (United Kingdom) Oliver Webb	Nissan VK45DE 4.5 L V8	M	139	+42.679
4	LMP2	41	(United Kingdom) Greaves Motorsport	(United Kingdom) Tom Kimber-Smith (United States) Matt McMurry	Zytek Z11SN	D	138	+1 Lap
4	LMP2	41	(United Kingdom) Greaves Motorsport	(United Kingdom) Tom Kimber-Smith (United States) Matt McMurry	Nissan VK45DE 4.5 L V8	D	138	+1 Lap
5	LMP2	46	(France) Thiriet by TDS Racing	(France) Pierre Thiriet (France) Ludovic Badey (France) Tristan Gommendy	Morgan LMP2	D	137	+2 Laps
5	LMP2	46	(France) Thiriet by TDS Racing	(France) Pierre Thiriet (France) Ludovic Badey (France) Tristan Gommendy	Nissan VK45DE 4.5 L V8	D	137	+2 Laps
6	LMP2	29	(Germany) Pegasus Racing	(France) Julien Schell (Austria) Niki Leutwiler (United Kingdom) Jonathan Coleman	Morgan LMP2	D	137	+2 Laps
6	LMP2	29	(Germany) Pegasus Racing	(France) Julien Schell (Austria) Niki Leutwiler (United Kingdom) Jonathan Coleman	Nissan VK45DE 4.5 L V8	D	137	+2 Laps
7	**LMGTE**	**72**	**(Russia) SMP Racing**	**(Italy) Andrea Bertolini (Russia) Viktor Shaitar (Russia) Sergey Zlobin**	**Ferrari 458 Italia GT2**	M	**134**	**+5 Laps**
7	**LMGTE**	**72**	**(Russia) SMP Racing**	**(Italy) Andrea Bertolini (Russia) Viktor Shaitar (Russia) Sergey Zlobin**	**Ferrari F136 4.5 L V8**	M	**134**	**+5 Laps**
8	LMGTE	81	(Switzerland) Kessel Racing	(Italy) Thomas Kemenater (Italy) Matteo Cressoni	Ferrari 458 Italia GT2	M	134	+5 Laps
8	LMGTE	81	(Switzerland) Kessel Racing	(Italy) Thomas Kemenater (Italy) Matteo Cressoni	Ferrari F136 4.5 L V8	M	134	+5 Laps
9	LMGTE	66	(United Kingdom) JMW Motorsport	(United Kingdom) Daniel McKenzie (United Kingdom) George Richardson (Italy) Daniel Zampieri	Ferrari 458 Italia GT2	D	134	+5 Laps
9	LMGTE	66	(United Kingdom) JMW Motorsport	(United Kingdom) Daniel McKenzie (United Kingdom) George Richardson (Italy) Daniel Zampieri	Ferrari F136 4.5 L V8	D	134	+5 Laps
10	LMGTE	56	(Austria) AT Racing	(Belarus) Alexander Talkanitsa Sr. (Belarus) Alexander Talkanitsa Jr. (Germany) Pierre Kaffer	Ferrari 458 Italia GT2	M	133	+6 Laps
10	LMGTE	56	(Austria) AT Racing	(Belarus) Alexander Talkanitsa Sr. (Belarus) Alexander Talkanitsa Jr. (Germany) Pierre Kaffer	Ferrari F136 4.5 L V8	M	133	+6 Laps
11	LMGTE	58	(France) Team SOFREV-ASP	(France) Anthony Pons (France) Soheil Ayari (France) Fabien Barthez	Ferrari 458 Italia GT2	M	133	+6 Laps
11	LMGTE	58	(France) Team SOFREV-ASP	(France) Anthony Pons (France) Soheil Ayari (France) Fabien Barthez	Ferrari F136 4.5 L V8	M	133	+6 Laps
12	LMGTE	76	(France) IMSA Performance Matmut	(France) Raymond Narac (France) Nicolas Armindo (France) David Hallyday	Porsche 997 GT3-RSR	M	132	+7 Laps
12	LMGTE	76	(France) IMSA Performance Matmut	(France) Raymond Narac (France) Nicolas Armindo (France) David Hallyday	Porsche M97/74 4.0 L Flat-6	M	132	+7 Laps
13	**GTC**	**60**	**(Denmark) Formula Racing**	**(Denmark) Johnny Laursen (Denmark) Mikkel Mac (Italy) Andrea Piccini**	**Ferrari 458 Italia GT3**	M	**132**	**+7 Laps**
13	**GTC**	**60**	**(Denmark) Formula Racing**	**(Denmark) Johnny Laursen (Denmark) Mikkel Mac (Italy) Andrea Piccini**	**Ferrari F136 4.5 L V8**	M	**132**	**+7 Laps**
14	GTC	73	(Russia) SMP Racing	(Monaco) Olivier Beretta (Russia) Anton Ladygin (Russia) David Markozov	Ferrari 458 Italia GT3	M	132	+7 Laps
14	GTC	73	(Russia) SMP Racing	(Monaco) Olivier Beretta (Russia) Anton Ladygin (Russia) David Markozov	Ferrari F136 4.5 L V8	M	132	+7 Laps
15	GTC	71	(Russia) SMP Racing	(Russia) Kirill Ladygin (Italy) Luca Persiani (Russia) Aleksey Basov	Ferrari 458 Italia GT3	M	132	+7 Laps
15	GTC	71	(Russia) SMP Racing	(Russia) Kirill Ladygin (Italy) Luca Persiani (Russia) Aleksey Basov	Ferrari F136 4.5 L V8	M	132	+7 Laps
16	LMGTE	55	(Italy) AF Corse	(United Kingdom) Duncan Cameron (Republic of Ireland) Matt Griffin (Italy) Mirko Venturi	Ferrari 458 Italia GT2	M	132	+7 Laps
16	LMGTE	55	(Italy) AF Corse	(United Kingdom) Duncan Cameron (Republic of Ireland) Matt Griffin (Italy) Mirko Venturi	Ferrari F136 4.5 L V8	M	132	+7 Laps
17	LMGTE	86	(United Kingdom) Gulf Racing UK	(United Kingdom) Michael Wainwright (United Kingdom) Adam Carroll (United Kingdom) Ben Barker	Porsche 997 GT3-RSR	M	132	+7 Laps
17	LMGTE	86	(United Kingdom) Gulf Racing UK	(United Kingdom) Michael Wainwright (United Kingdom) Adam Carroll (United Kingdom) Ben Barker	Porsche M97/74 4.0 L Flat-6	M	132	+7 Laps
18	LMP2	34	(Switzerland) Race Performance	(Switzerland) Michel Frey (France) Franck Mailleux	Oreca 03	D	132	+7 Laps
18	LMP2	34	(Switzerland) Race Performance	(Switzerland) Michel Frey (France) Franck Mailleux	Judd HK 3.6 L V8	D	132	+7 Laps
19	LMGTE	85	(United Kingdom) Gulf Racing UK	(Germany) Roald Goethe (United Kingdom) Stuart Hall (United Kingdom) Dan Brown	Aston Martin V8 Vantage GTE	M	131	+8 Laps
19	LMGTE	85	(United Kingdom) Gulf Racing UK	(Germany) Roald Goethe (United Kingdom) Stuart Hall (United Kingdom) Dan Brown	Aston Martin AM05 4.5 L V8	M	131	+8 Laps
20	LMGTE	82	(France) Crubilé Sport	(France) Sebastien Crubilé (France) François Perrodo (France) Emmanuel Collard	Porsche 997 GT3-RSR	M	130	+9 Laps
20	LMGTE	82	(France) Crubilé Sport	(France) Sebastien Crubilé (France) François Perrodo (France) Emmanuel Collard	Porsche M97/74 4.0 L Flat-6	M	130	+9 Laps
21	GTC	99	(France) ART Grand Prix	(Mexico) Ricardo González (Switzerland) Karim Ajlani (United Kingdom) Alex Brundle	McLaren MP4-12C GT3	M	129	+10 Laps
21	GTC	99	(France) ART Grand Prix	(Mexico) Ricardo González (Switzerland) Karim Ajlani (United Kingdom) Alex Brundle	McLaren M838T 3.8 L Turbo V8	M	129	+10 Laps
22	LMGTE	67	(France) IMSA Performance Matmut	(France) Erik Maris (France) Jean-Marc Merlin (France) Éric Hélary	Porsche 997 GT3-RSR	M	129	+10 Laps
22	LMGTE	67	(France) IMSA Performance Matmut	(France) Erik Maris (France) Jean-Marc Merlin (France) Éric Hélary	Porsche M97/74 4.0 L Flat-6	M	129	+10 Laps
23	GTC	59	(France) Team SOFREV-ASP	(France) Christophe Bourret (France) Pascal Gibon (France) Jean-Philippe Belloc	Ferrari 458 Italia GT3	M	129	+10 Laps
23	GTC	59	(France) Team SOFREV-ASP	(France) Christophe Bourret (France) Pascal Gibon (France) Jean-Philippe Belloc	Ferrari F136 4.5 L V8	M	129	+10 Laps
24	GTC	63	(Italy) AF Corse	(Denmark) Mads Rasmussen (Russia) Ilya Melnikov	Ferrari 458 Italia GT3	M	129	+10 Laps
24	GTC	63	(Italy) AF Corse	(Denmark) Mads Rasmussen (Russia) Ilya Melnikov	Ferrari F136 4.5 L V8	M	129	+10 Laps
25	GTC	94	(Italy) AF Corse	(Switzerland) Thomas Flohr (Italy) Francesco Castellacci	Ferrari 458 Italia GT3	M	129	+10 Laps
25	GTC	94	(Italy) AF Corse	(Switzerland) Thomas Flohr (Italy) Francesco Castellacci	Ferrari F136 4.5 L V8	M	129	+10 Laps
26	GTC	98	(France) ART Grand Prix	(Estonia) Kevin Korjus (France) Grégoire Demoustier (France) Yann Goudy	McLaren MP4-12C GT3	M	128	+11 Laps
26	GTC	98	(France) ART Grand Prix	(Estonia) Kevin Korjus (France) Grégoire Demoustier (France) Yann Goudy	McLaren M838T 3.8 L Turbo V8	M	128	+11 Laps
27	GTC	78	Team Russia by Barwell	(Russia) Leo Machitski (Russia) Timur Sardarov (United Kingdom) Jonny Cocker	BMW Z4 GT3	M	128	+11 Laps
27	GTC	78	Team Russia by Barwell	(Russia) Leo Machitski (Russia) Timur Sardarov (United Kingdom) Jonny Cocker	BMW P65B44 4.4 L V8	M	128	+11 Laps
28	GTC	78	(Russia) SMP Racing	(Russia) Boris Rotenberg (Finland) Mika Salo (Italy) Maurizio Mediani	Ferrari 458 Italia GT3	M	127	+12 Laps
28	GTC	78	(Russia) SMP Racing	(Russia) Boris Rotenberg (Finland) Mika Salo (Italy) Maurizio Mediani	Ferrari F136 4.5 L V8	M	127	+12 Laps
29	GTC	93	(France) Pro GT by Almeras	(France) Franck Perera (France) Lucas Lasserre (France) Eric Dermont	Porsche 997 GT3 R	M	127	+12 Laps
29	GTC	93	(France) Pro GT by Almeras	(France) Franck Perera (France) Lucas Lasserre (France) Eric Dermont	Porsche M97/74 4.0 L Flat-6	M	127	+12 Laps
30	GTC	95	(Italy) AF Corse	(Netherlands) Adrien De Leneer (Monaco) Cédric Sbirrazzuoli	Ferrari 458 Italia GT3	M	126	+13 Laps
30	GTC	95	(Italy) AF Corse	(Netherlands) Adrien De Leneer (Monaco) Cédric Sbirrazzuoli	Ferrari F136 4.5 L V8	M	126	+13 Laps
31	GTC	62	(Italy) AF Corse	(France) Yannick Mollegol (France) Jean-Marc Bachelier (United States) Howard Blank	Ferrari 458 Italia GT3	M	126	+13 Laps
31	GTC	62	(Italy) AF Corse	(France) Yannick Mollegol (France) Jean-Marc Bachelier (United States) Howard Blank	Ferrari F136 4.5 L V8	M	126	+13 Laps
32	GTC	65	(Italy) AF Corse	(United States) Peter Ashley Mann (Italy) Lorenzo Casé (Italy) Raffaele Giammaria	Ferrari 458 Italia GT3	M	124	+15 Laps
32	GTC	65	(Italy) AF Corse	(United States) Peter Ashley Mann (Italy) Lorenzo Casé (Italy) Raffaele Giammaria	Ferrari F136 4.5 L V8	M	124	+15 Laps
DNF	LMP2	43	(Switzerland) Newblood by Morand Racing	(France) Gary Hirsch (France) Romain Brandela (Austria) Christian Klien	Morgan LMP2	D	136	Did not finish
DNF	LMP2	43	(Switzerland) Newblood by Morand Racing	(France) Gary Hirsch (France) Romain Brandela (Austria) Christian Klien	Judd HK 3.6 L V8	D	136	Did not finish
DNF	GTC	75	(Belgium) Prospeed Competition	(Netherlands) Paul Van Splunteren (Belgium) Maxime Soulet (France) Gilles Vannelet	Porsche 997 GT3 R	M	118	Did not finish
DNF	GTC	75	(Belgium) Prospeed Competition	(Netherlands) Paul Van Splunteren (Belgium) Maxime Soulet (France) Gilles Vannelet	Porsche M97/74 4.0 L Flat-6	M	118	Did not finish
DNF	LMGTE	80	(Switzerland) Kessel Racing	(Poland) Michał Broniszewski (Italy) Giacomo Piccini	Ferrari 458 Italia GT2	M	99	Did not finish
DNF	LMGTE	80	(Switzerland) Kessel Racing	(Poland) Michał Broniszewski (Italy) Giacomo Piccini	Ferrari F136 4.5 L V8	M	99	Did not finish
DNF	LMP2	48	(Republic of Ireland) Murphy Prototypes	(India) Karun Chandhok (Venezuela) Rodolfo González (France) Nathanaël Berthon	Oreca 03	D	80	Did not finish
DNF	LMP2	48	(Republic of Ireland) Murphy Prototypes	(India) Karun Chandhok (Venezuela) Rodolfo González (France) Nathanaël Berthon	Nissan VK45DE 4.5 L V8	D	80	Did not finish
DNF	LMGTE	54	(Italy) AF Corse	(Italy) Piergiuseppe Perazzini (Italy) Marco Cioci (United Kingdom) Michael Lyons	Ferrari 458 Italia GT2	M	66	Did not finish
DNF	LMGTE	54	(Italy) AF Corse	(Italy) Piergiuseppe Perazzini (Italy) Marco Cioci (United Kingdom) Michael Lyons	Ferrari F136 4.5 L V8	M	66	Did not finish

European Le Mans Series
Previous race: 4 Hours of Silverstone	2014 season	Next race: 4 Hours of Red Bull Ring
