= Nelson Panciatici =

French racing driver

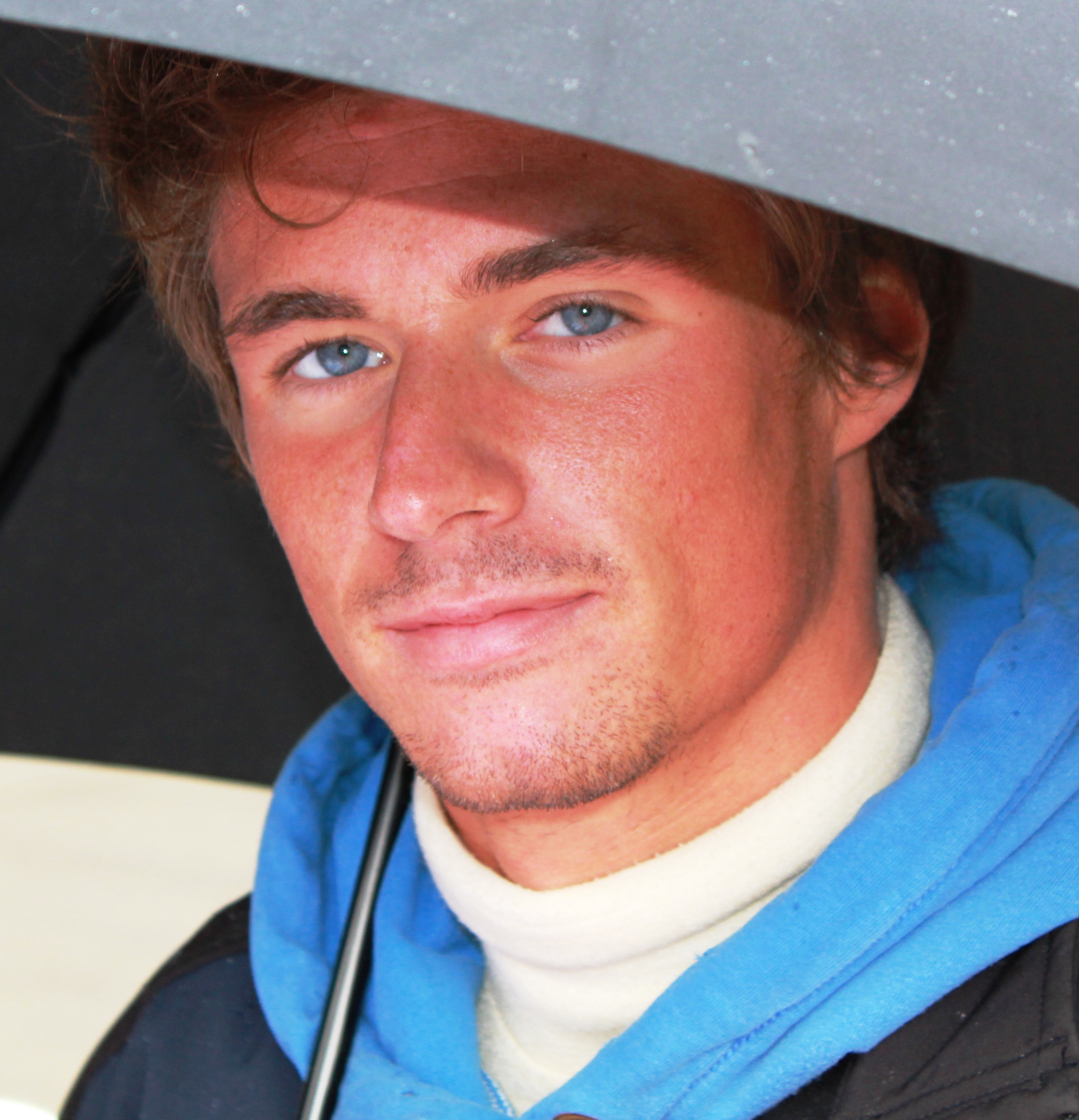
- Panciatici at the 2011 Nürburgring World series by Renault round
- Nationality: (France) French
- Born: Nelson Hugo Douchan Panciatici; 26 September 1988 (age 38) Reims (France)

Formula Renault 3.5 Series career
- Debut season: 2010
- Current team: Lotus Racing Junior Team
- Categorisation: FIA Gold (until 2012, 2020–2023); FIA Platinum (2013–2019); FIA Silver (2024–)
- Car number: 10
- Starts: 0
- Wins: 0
- Poles: 0
- Fastest laps: 0

Previous series
- 2009 2009 2008 2008 2006–07 2005–07: GP2 Series; Superleague Formula; Formula Three Euroseries; Spanish Formula Three; Eurocup Formula Renault 2.0; French Formula Renault

24 Hours of Le Mans career
- Years: 2012–2016
- Teams: Signatech-Nissan
- Best finish: 7th (2014)
- Class wins: 0

Nelson Hugo Douchan Panciatici (born 26 September 1988) is a French professional racing driver.

== Career ==
=== Karting ===
Born in Reims, Panciatici started his karting career in 1998 and continued until 2004. His best championship position was second place in 2004 in the French Championship Elite.

=== Formula Renault 2.0 ===
In 2005, Panciatici participated in the Formula Renault 2.0 France championship for the first time with the team Epsilon Sport. He finished 13th overall and was second rookie.

In 2006, Panciatici raced in both the Formula Renault 2.0 French and Eurocup championships placing fifth in the French championship with one win. Since he only raced in two of the Eurocup races, he was not classified that season.

In 2007, Panciatici was selected to be a part of the Renault Driver Development and continued to race in the Formula Renault 2.0 Eurocup and French championships. He was very quick in the pre-season testing, but he had a tough season in both the French championship and the Eurocup with only three podiums. At the end of the season, he switched from the team SG Formula to the team Boutsen-Energy Racing and had some better results there.

=== Spanish Formula Three ===
In 2008, Panciatici raced in the Spanish Formula Three Championship with the Q8 Oils Hache Team. He was the runner-up in the overall championship and runner-up in the Spanish Cup (Copa de España), despite scoring more points than champion Natacha Gachnang. He also forayed into the Formula Three Euroseries, appearing at Le Mans, for RC Motorsport. He finished the races in fifteenth and eighteenth places.

=== GP2 Series ===
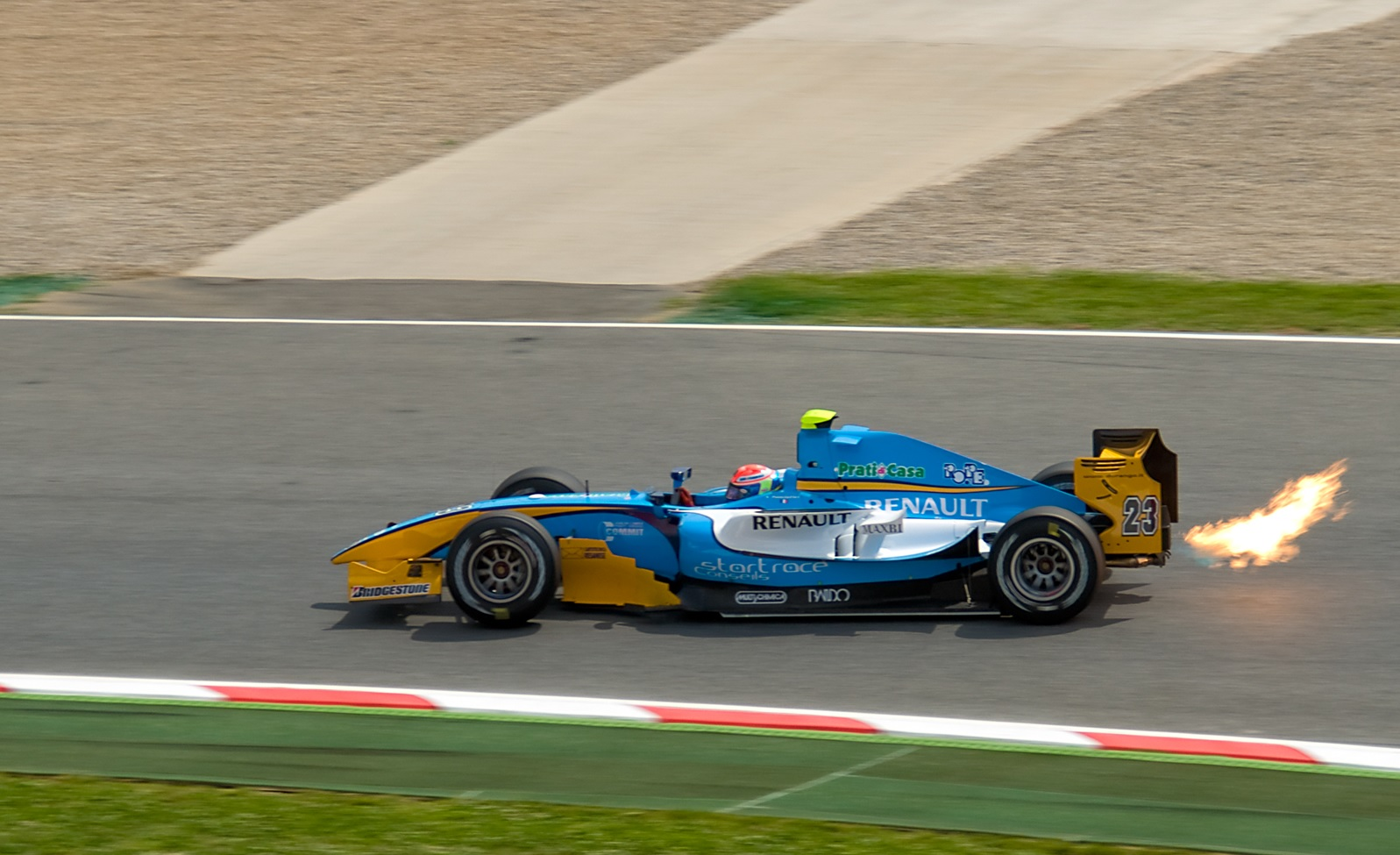
Panciatici driving for Durango at the Catalunya round of the 2009 GP2 Series season.

For 2009, Panciatici moved up into the GP2 Series, having been announced as the Durango team's second driver on 21 March 2009. Panciatici partnered veteran of the series Davide Valsecchi and Stefano Coletti as Durango failed to improve on their 11th-place finish in 2008.

=== Formula Renault 3.5 ===
Panciatici would move into the Formula Renault 3.5 Series for the 2010 season, partnering Daniil Move at the newly renamed Lotus Racing Junior Team.

== Racing record ==
=== Career summary ===
Season	Series	Team	Races	Wins	Poles	F/Laps	Podiums	Points	Position
2005	Formula Renault 2.0 France	Epsilon Sport	16	0	0	0	0	19	13th
2006	Formula Renault 2.0 France	Epsilon Sport	13	1	1	5	5	61	5th
2006	Formula Renault 2.0 Eurocup	Epsilon Euskadi	4	0	0	0	1	0	NC†
2007	Formula Renault 2.0 France	SG Formula	6	0	0	0	0	19	13th
2007	Formula Renault 2.0 Eurocup	SG Formula	14	0	0	0	3	44	10th
2008	Formula 3 Euroseries	RC Motorsport	2	0	0	0	0	0	NC†
2008	Spanish Formula 3 Championship	Hache International	17	0	0	1	6	84	**2nd**
2009	GP2 Series	Durango	16	0	0	0	0	0	24th
2009	Superleague Formula	Olympique Lyonnais	12	0	0	0	0	160	17th
2010	Formula Renault 3.5 Series	Junior Lotus Racing	17	0	0	0	0	44	12th
2011	Formula Renault 3.5 Series	KMP Racing	16	0	0	0	1	55	9th
2012	FIA World Endurance Championship	Signatech-Nissan	7	0	0	1	1	11.5	25th
2012	24 Hours of Le Mans - LMP2	Signatech-Nissan	1	0	0	0	0	N/A	4th
2013	European Le Mans Series - LMP2	Signatech Alpine	5	1	0	0	3	85	**1st**
2013	24 Hours of Le Mans - LMP2	Signatech Alpine	1	0	0	0	0	N/A	8th
2014	European Le Mans Series - LMP2	Signatech Alpine	5	1	0	0	3	78	**1st**
2014	24 Hours of Le Mans - LMP2	Signatech Alpine	1	0	0	1	1	N/A	**3rd**
2015	FIA World Endurance Championship - LMP2	Signatech Alpine	8	1	1	0	2	86	4th
2015	24 Hours of Le Mans - LMP2	Signatech Alpine	1	0	0	0	0	N/A	DNF
2015	FFSA GT Championship	Team Duqueine	9	0	0	0	1	55	15th
2015	Renault Sport Trophy - Elite	Monlau Competición	2	0	0	0	0	0	NC†
2015	Renault Sport Trophy - Endurance	Monlau Competición	1	0	0	0	0	0	NC†
2016	FIA World Endurance Championship - LMP2	Baxi DC Racing Alpine	6	0	0	0	0	26	23rd
2016	24 Hours of Le Mans - LMP2	Baxi DC Racing Alpine	1	0	0	0	0	N/A	DNF
2016	Renault Sport Trophy - Pro	Duqueine Engineering	3	0	0	0	1	29	14th
2016	Renault Sport Trophy - Endurance	Duqueine Engineering	2	0	0	0	0	5	28th
2017	FIA World Endurance Championship - LMP2	Signatech Alpine Matmut	3	0	0	0	1	38	20th
2017	24 Hours of Le Mans - LMP2	Signatech Alpine Matmut	1	0	0	0	1	N/A	**3rd**
2017	V de V Endurance Series - LMP3	Duqueine Engineering	7	3	2	2	4	201.5	**3rd**
2018	European Le Mans Series - LMP2	Duqueine Engineering	6	0	1	0	1	34	11th
2018	IMSA SportsCar Championship - Prototype	JDC-Miller MotorSports	2	0	0	0	0	45	39th
2019	TCR Europe Touring Car Series	M Racing	14	0	0	2	1	205	5th
2020	GT World Challenge Europe Endurance Cup	CMR	3	0	0	0	0	0	NC
2020	GT World Challenge Europe Sprint Cup	CMR	8	0	0	1	1	22.5	13th
2020	Intercontinental GT Challenge	CMR	1	0	0	0	0	0	NC
2021	FIA World Endurance Championship - LMP2	ARC Bratislava	1	0	0	0	0	1	31st
2021	GT World Challenge Europe Endurance Cup	CMR							
2021	GT World Challenge Europe Sprint Cup	CMR	8	0	0	0	0	3	29th
2022	Italian GT Sprint Championship - GT3 Pro	Scuderia Baldini 27	4	0	0	0	2	38	4th
2022	Trophée MitJet 2L France	MitJet International	2	0	0	0	0	0	NC†
2024	GT4 European Series - Silver	Code Racing Development							
2024	French GT4 Cup - Pro-Am	Code Racing Development							
2024	GT World Challenge Europe Endurance Cup	2 Seas Motorsport							
2025	French GT4 Cup - Pro-Am	Chazel Technologie Course							

† - Panciatici was ineligible to score points.

=== Complete Eurocup Formula Renault 2.0 results ===
(key) (Races in bold indicate pole position; races in italics indicate fastest lap)

Year	Entrant	1	2	3	4	5	6	7	8	9	10	11	12	13	14	DC	Points
2006	Epsilon Euskadi	ZOL; 1	ZOL; 2	IST; 1	IST; 2	MIS; 1	MIS; 2	NÜR; 1	NÜR; 2	DON; 1	DON; 2	LMS; 1; 4	LMS; 2; 3	CAT; 1; 18	CAT; 2; 13	NC†	0
2007	SG Formula	ZOL; 1; 3	ZOL; 2 Ret	NÜR; 1; 9	NÜR; 2; 14	HUN; 1 Ret	HUN; 2; 3	DON; 1; 8	DON; 2; 3	MAG; 1 Ret	MAG; 2; 7	EST; 1; 10	EST; 2; 11	CAT; 1; 8	CAT; 2 Ret	10th	44

† As Panciatici was a guest driver, he was ineligible for points

=== Complete GP2 Series results ===
(key) (Races in bold indicate pole position) (Races in italics indicate fastest lap)

Year	Entrant	1	2	3	4	5	6	7	8	9	10	11	12	13	14	15	16	17	18	19	20	DC	Points
2009	Durango	CAT; FEA; 12	CAT; SPR; 18	MON; FEA; Ret	MON; SPR; 15	IST; FEA; Ret	IST; SPR; Ret	SIL; FEA; 18	SIL; SPR; Ret	NÜR; FEA; 19†	NÜR; SPR; 13	HUN; FEA; 14	HUN; SPR; 20	VAL; FEA; Ret	VAL; SPR; 15	SPA; FEA; 11	SPA; SPR; 13	MNZ; FEA	MNZ; SPR	ALG; FEA	ALG; SPR	24th	0

=== Superleague Formula ===
==== 2009 ====
(Races in bold indicate pole position) (Races in italics indicate fastest lap)

Year	Team	Operator	1		2		3		4		5		6		Position	Points
2009	Olympique Lyonnais	Barazi-Epsilon	MAG		ZOL		DON		EST		MOZ		JAR		17th	160
2009	Olympique Lyonnais	Barazi-Epsilon	13	13	14	10	14	9	12	15	13	15	9	11	17th	160

==== 2009 Super Final Results ====
- Super Final results in 2009 did not count for points towards the main championship.

Year	Team	1	2	3	4	5	6
2009	**Olympique Lyonnais**; **Barazi-Epsilon**	MAG; DNQ	ZOL; N/A	DON; DNQ	EST; DNQ	MOZ; N/A	JAR; DNQ

=== Complete Formula Renault 3.5 Series results ===
(key) (Races in bold indicate pole position) (Races in italics indicate fastest lap)

Year	Team	1	2	3	4	5	6	7	8	9	10	11	12	13	14	15	16	17	Pos	Points
2010	Junior Lotus Racing	ALC; 1; 5	ALC; 2; 9	SPA; 1 Ret	SPA; 2 Ret	MON; 1; 9	BRN; 1; 13	BRN; 2; 8	MAG; 1; 4	MAG; 2; 9	HUN; 1; 5	HUN; 2; 12	HOC; 1 Ret	HOC; 2; 12	SIL; 1; 4	SIL; 2; 9	CAT; 1; 16	CAT; 2; 6	12th	44
2011	KMP Racing	ALC; 1; 3	ALC; 2 Ret	SPA; 1; 5	SPA; 2; 10	MNZ; 1 DNS	MNZ; 2; 7	MON; 1; 5	NÜR; 1; 18	NÜR; 2; 15	HUN; 1; 7	HUN; 2; 17	SIL; 1; 20†	SIL; 2; 17	LEC; 1; 10	LEC; 2; 11	CAT; 1; 7	CAT; 2 Ret	9th	55

^{†} Driver did not finish the race, but was classified as he completed more than 90% of the race distance.

=== 24 Hours of Le Mans results ===
Year	Team	Co-Drivers	Car	Class	Laps	Pos.	Class Pos.
2012	(France) Signatech-Nissan	(France) Pierre Ragues (Russia) Roman Rusinov	Oreca 03-Nissan	LMP2	351	10th	4th
2013	(France) Signatech-Alpine	(France) Pierre Ragues (France) Tristan Gommendy	Alpine A450-Nissan	LMP2	317	14th	8th
2014	(France) Signatech-Alpine	(France) Paul-Loup Chatin (United Kingdom) Oliver Webb	Alpine A450b-Nissan	LMP2	355	7th	**3rd**
2015	(France) Signatech-Alpine	(France) Paul-Loup Chatin (France) Vincent Capillaire	Alpine A450b-Nissan	LMP2	110	DNF	DNF
2016	(China) Baxi DC Racing Alpine	(United States) David Cheng (China) Ho-Pin Tung	Alpine A460-Nissan	LMP2	234	DNF	DNF
2017	(France) Signatech Alpine Matmut	(France) Pierre Ragues (Brazil) André Negrão	Alpine A470-Gibson	LMP2	362	4th	**3rd**

=== Complete FIA World Endurance Championship results ===
Year	Entrant	Class	Car	Engine	1	2	3	4	5	6	7	8	9	Rank	Points
2012	Signatech-Nissan	LMP2	Oreca 03	Nissan VK45DE 4.5 L V8	SEB	SPA; 25	LMS; 8	SIL; 10	SÃO; 14	BHR; 10	FUJ; EX	SHA; 13		25th	11.5
2015	Signatech-Alpine	LMP2	Alpine A450b	Nissan VK45DE 4.5 L V8	SIL; Ret	SPA; 4	LMS; Ret	NÜR; 5	COA; 6	FUJ; 2	SHA; 1	**BHR**; 4		4th	86
2016	Baxi DC Racing-Alpine	LMP2	Alpine A650	Nissan VK45DE 4.5 L V8	SIL; 7	SPA; Ret	LMS; Ret	NÜR; 7	MEX; 5	COA; 8	FUJ	SHA	BHR	23rd	26
2017	Signatech Alpine Matmut	LMP2	Alpine A470	Gibson GK428 4.2 L V8	SIL	SPA; 6	LMS; 3	NÜR; Ret	MEX	COA	FUJ	SHA	BHR	20th	38
2021	ARC Bratislava	LMP2	Oreca 07	Gibson GK428 4.2 L V8	SPA	ALG	MNZ	LMS	BHR	BHR; 11				31st	1

=== Complete European Le Mans Series results ===
Year	Entrant	Class	Chassis	Engine	1	2	3	4	5	6	Rank	Points
2013	Signatech Alpine	LMP2	Alpine A450	Nissan VK45DE 4.5 L V8	SIL; 4	IMO; 2	RBR; 2	HUN; 1	LEC; 4		1st	85
2014	Signatech Alpine	LMP2	Alpine (Oreca 03)	Nissan VK45DE 4.5 L V8	SIL; 5	IMO; 3	RBR; 1	LEC; 2	EST; 5		1st	78
2018	Duqueine Engineering	LMP2	Oreca 07	Gibson GK428 4.2 L V8	LEC; 3	MNZ; 6	RBR; DSQ	SIL; 7	SPA; 5‡	**ALG**; Ret	11th	35

^{‡} Half points awarded as less than 75% of race distance was completed.

=== WRC results ===
Year	Entrant	Car	1	2	3	4	5	6	7	8	9	10	11	12	13	WDC	Points
2012	Nelson Panciatici	Citroën DS3 R3T	MON; 35	SWE	MEX	POR	ARG	GRE	NZL	FIN	GER	GBR	FRA	ITA	ESP	NC	0
2013	Nelson Panciatici	Renault Twingo R2	MON; Ret	SWE	MEX	POR	ARG	GRE	ITA	FIN	GER	AUS	FRA	ESP	GBR	NC	0

=== Complete IMSA SportsCar Championship results ===
Year	Entrant	Class	Chassis	Engine	1	2	3	4	5	6	7	8	9	10	Rank	Points
2018	JDC-Miller MotorSports	P	Oreca 07	Gibson GK428 4.2 L V8	DAY	SEB; 9	LBH	MDO	DET	WGL; 8	MOS	ELK	LGA	PET	39th	45

=== Complete TCR Europe Touring Car Series results ===
(key) (Races in bold indicate pole position) (Races in italics indicate fastest lap)

Year	Team	Car	1	2	3	4	5	6	7	8	9	10	11	12	13	14	DC	Points
2019	M Racing	Hyundai i30 N TCR	HUN; 1; 3	HUN; 2; 5	HOC; 1; 12	HOC; 2 Ret	SPA; 1; 16	SPA; 2 Ret	RBR; 1; 4	RBR; 2; 4	OSC; 1; 10	OSC; 2; 8	CAT; 1; 5	CAT; 2; 6	MNZ; 1; 10	MNZ; 2 Ret	5th	205

=== Complete GT World Challenge Europe Sprint Cup results ===
(key) (Races in bold indicate pole position) (Races in italics indicate fastest lap)

Year	Team	Car	Class	1	2	3	4	5	6	7	8	9	10	Pos.	Points
2020	CMR	Bentley Continental GT3	Pro	MIS; 1; 3	MIS; 2; 8	MIS; 3; 18	MAG; 1 Ret	MAG; 2; 10	ZAN; 1; 5	ZAN; 2; 6	CAT; 1; 21	CAT; 2 DNS	CAT; 3 DNS	13th	22.5
2021	CMR	Bentley Continental GT3	Pro	MAG; 1	MAG; 2	ZAN; 1; 20	ZAN; 2; 14	MIS; 1; 17	MIS; 2; 20	BRH; 1; 20	BRH; 2; 23	VAL; 1; 7	VAL; 2 Ret	29th	3

Sporting positions
Preceded by Mathias Beche; Pierre Thiriet	European Le Mans Series; LMP2 Champion; 2013; With: Pierre Ragues	Succeeded by Paul-Loup Chatin; Oliver Webb; Nelson Panciatici
Preceded by Nelson Panciatici; Pierre Ragues	European Le Mans Series; LMP2 Champion; 2014; With: Oliver Webb & Paul-Loup Chatin	Succeeded by Jon Lancaster; Björn Wirdheim; Gary Hirsch
