= Franck Perera =

French racing driver

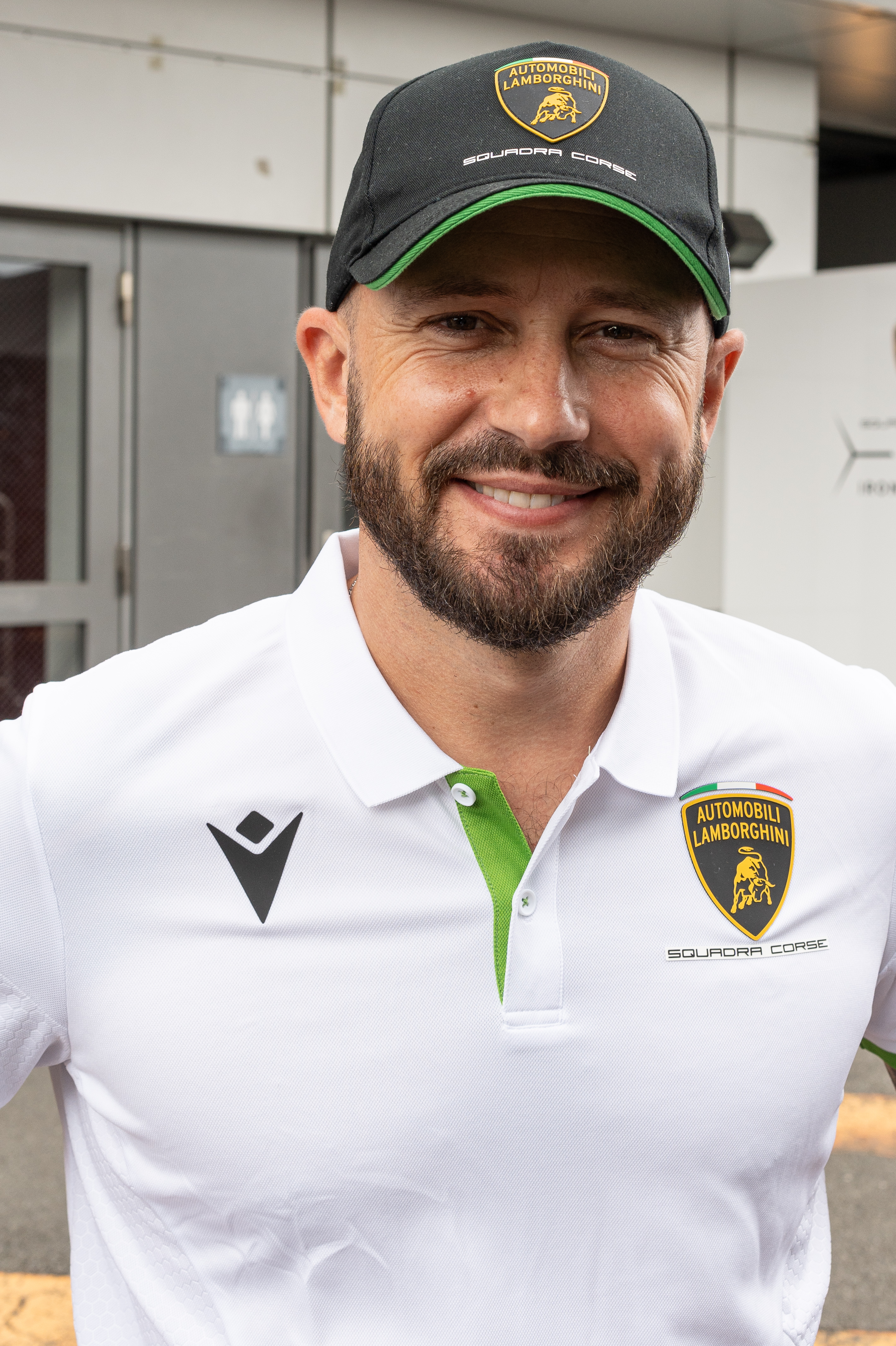
- Perera in 2024
- Nationality: (France) French
- Born: 21 March 1984 (age 42) Montpellier (France)

GP2 Series career
- Debut season: 2006
- Current team: David Price Racing
- Categorisation: FIA Gold (until 2019); FIA Platinum (2020–)
- Car number: 27
- Former teams: DAMS
- Starts: 26
- Wins: 0
- Poles: 0
- Fastest laps: 0
- Best finish: 16th in 2006

Previous series
- 2008–09 2008 2008 2007 2006 2004–05 2004–05 2003 2003 2002–03 2002–03: Superleague Formula; IndyCar Series; Firestone Indy Lights; Atlantic Championship; World Series by Renault; Formula One testing Formula Three Euroseries; FR2000 Germany; FR2000 Netherlands; FR2000 Masters; Formula Renault 2000 Italia

Championship titles
- 2015 2003: European Le Mans Series - GTC; Formula Renault 2000 Italia

Franck Perera (born 21 March 1984 in Montpellier, France) is a professional race car driver and a Lamborghini Squadra Corse factory driver.

== Career ==
In 2006, Perera drove in the GP2 Series for the DAMS team, after four years of racing for the Prema team in junior championships. In 2007, he drove for Condor Motorsports in the Atlantic Championship, scoring three wins and finishing second in the championship behind Raphael Matos. On 6 February 2008, Perera announced that he had signed with Conquest Racing to compete in the Champ Car World Series in 2008 after a successful test with the team. However, shortly thereafter Champ Car and the Indy Racing League unified, canceling the Champ Car season. It was announced on 25 February that Perera had modified his deal in order to continue with the team in the IRL IndyCar Series. He lost the ride after three races due to funding issues stemming from the bankruptcy of his sponsor Opes Prime, causing the team to hire Brazilian driver Jaime Camara.

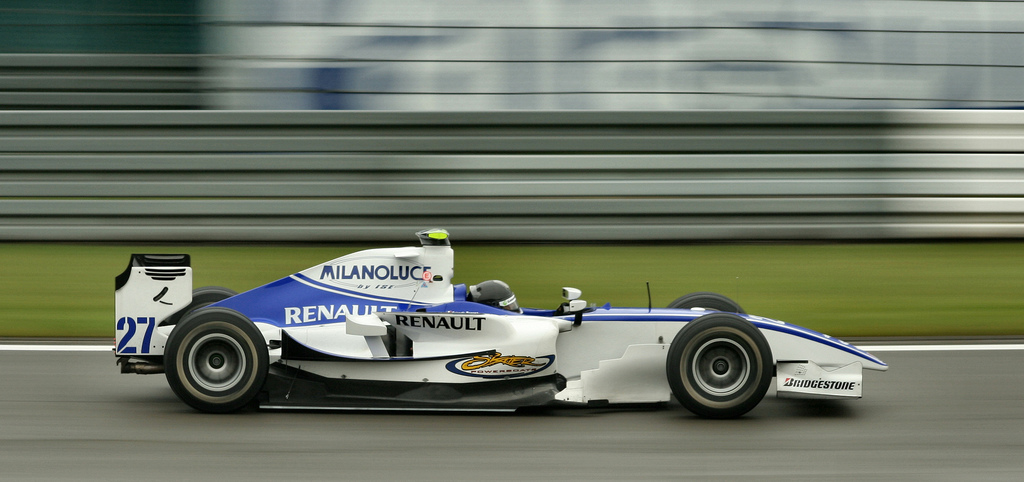
Perera driving for David Price Racing at the Nürburgring round of the 2009 GP2 Series season

In order to continue racing in the US, Perera signed to drive in Firestone Indy Lights with Guthrie Racing for the remainder of the 2008 season and made his debut in the seventh race of the season at the Iowa Speedway. He captured his first series victory from the pole at Infineon Raceway, his eighth start. He returned to the IndyCar Series for the points-scoring finale at Chicagoland Speedway, driving the No. 41 car of A. J. Foyt Enterprises. He was also signed to drive the car of A.S. Roma in the brand new Superleague Formula championship in 2008.

Perera returned to the GP2 Series in 2009, replacing Giacomo Ricci at David Price Racing. Perera was not allowed to start the feature race of the Hungarian round, due to causing an avoidable accident in qualifying, with Romain Grosjean. As his lap time was outside 107% of Lucas di Grassi's pole time, the stewards refused to let him race due to the accident. Grosjean however, was allowed to start. Perera also failed to qualify for both races of the championship held at the Spa-Francorchamps circuit. He left the GP2 Series for the second time after the Spa round. Perera returned to A.S. Roma in the Superleague Formula in 2009 for the Estoril round taking over from Jonathan Kennard. He was replaced at the next round by Julien Jousse.

In 2013, Perera returned full-time, driving a Porsche 911 in the Blancpain Endurance Series for Pro GT by Almeras in the Pro-Am class.

== Racing record ==
=== Career summary ===
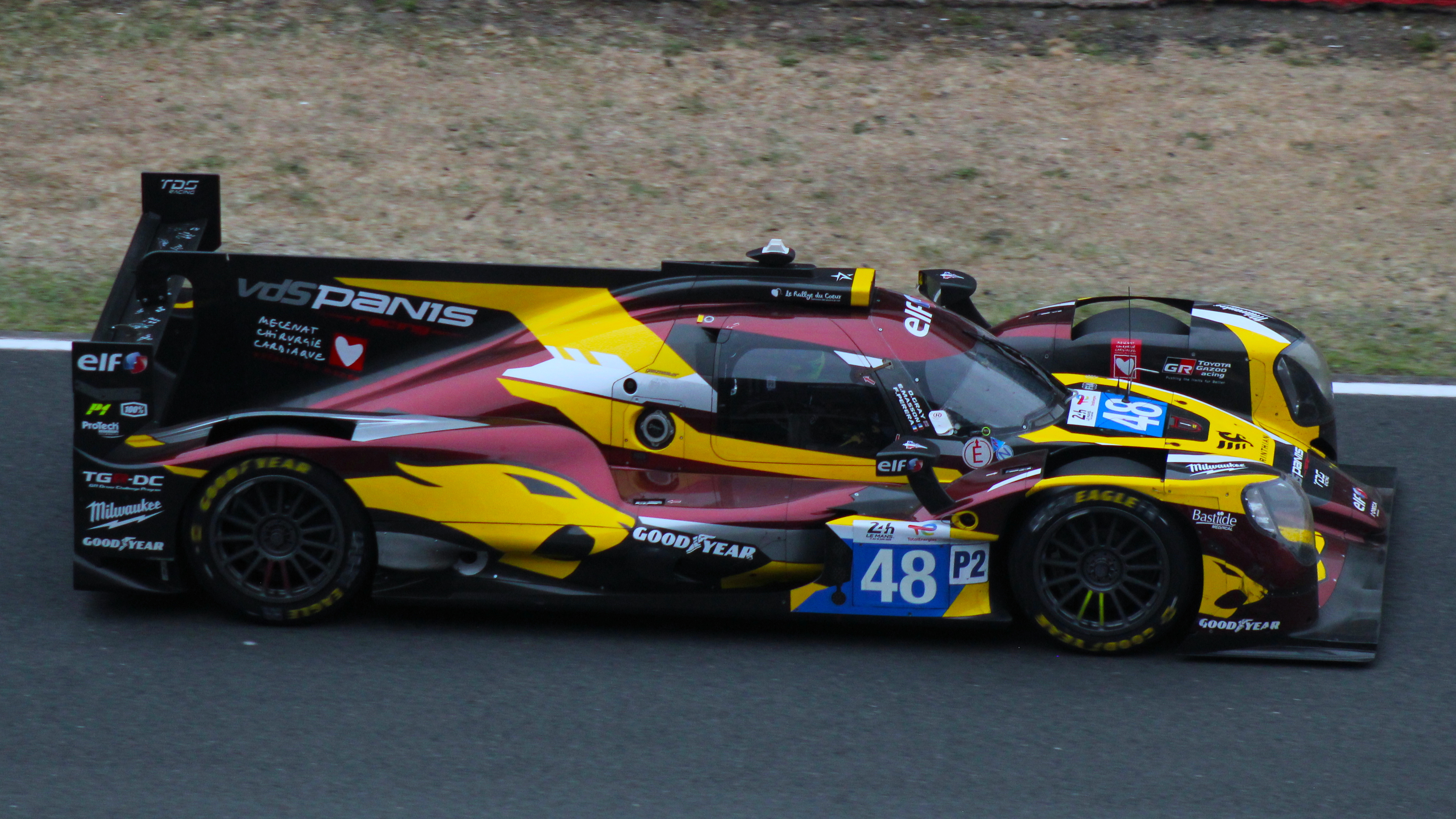
Perera's No. 48 car at the 2025 24 Hours of Le Mans

Season	Series	Team	Races	Wins	Poles	F/Laps	Podiums	Points	Position
2002	Formula Renault 2000 Italia	Prema Powerteam	9	0	0	0	2	76	8th
2002	Formula Renault 2000 Eurocup	Prema Powerteam	7	0	0	0	0	24	13th
2003	Formula Renault 2000 Italia	Prema Powerteam	12	5	7	5	8	242	**1st**
2003	Formula Renault 2000 Masters	Prema Powerteam	8	0	1	0	0	40	10th
2003	Formula Renault 2000 Germany	Prema Powerteam	4	0	0	1	0	19	30th
2004	Formula 3 Euroseries	Prema Powerteam	20	0	0	0	4	48	8th
2004	Bahrain Superprix	Prema Powerteam	2	0	1	0	0	N/A	20th
2004	Masters of Formula 3	Prema Powerteam	1	0	0	0	0	N/A	11th
2004	Macau Grand Prix	Prema Powerteam	2	0	0	0	0	N/A	5th
2004	Formula One	Panasonic Toyota Racing	Test driver						
2005	Formula 3 Euroseries	Prema Powerteam	20	0	0	0	3	67	4th
2005	Masters of Formula 3	Prema Powerteam	1	0	0	0	0	N/A	8th
2005	Macau Grand Prix	Prema Powerteam	2	0	0	0	0	N/A	10th
2005	Formula One	Panasonic Toyota Racing	Test driver						
2006	GP2 Series	DAMS	21	0	0	0	1	8	17th
2006	Formula Renault 3.5 Series	Interwetten.com	2	0	0	0	0	13	22nd
2007	Atlantic Championship	Condor Motorsports	12	3	2	2	8	310	**2nd**
2008	Superleague Formula	A.S. Roma	6	0	1	0	2	307‡	5th‡
2008	Indy Lights	Guthrie Racing	9	1	2	2	2	220	17th
2008	IndyCar Series	Conquest Racing	3	0	0	0	0	71	29th
2008	IndyCar Series	A. J. Foyt Racing	0	0	0	0	0	71	29th
2009	GP2 Series	DPR	5	0	0	0	0	0	28th
2009	Superleague Formula	A.S. Roma	2	0	0	0	0	211‡	13th‡
2010	Superleague Formula	CR Flamengo	10	0	0	0	1	540‡	6th‡
2012	Blancpain Endurance Series - Pro-Am	Pro GT by Alméras	1	0	0	0	0	0	NC
2012	International GT Open - GTS	Pro GT by Philippe Alméras	2	0	0	0	0	0	NC†
2013	Blancpain Endurance Series - Pro-Am	Pro GT by Alméras	5	0	1	0	0	5	36th
2013	FFSA GT Championship	Pro GT by Alméras	13	1	1	0	5	125	5th
2013	International GT Open - GTS	Pro GT by Philippe Alméras	2	0	0	0	0	0	NC†
2014	Blancpain Endurance Series - Pro-Am	Pro GT by Alméras	4	0	1	0	0	24	15th
2014	European Le Mans Series - GTC	Pro GT by Alméras	4	0	0	0	0	18.5	14th
2014	International GT Open - GTS	TDS Racing	2	0	0	0	0	0	NC†
2015	Blancpain Endurance Series - Pro-Am	TDS Racing	5	0	0	1	0	18	18th
2015	European Le Mans Series - GTC	TDS Racing	5	2	3	1	4	101	**1st**
2015	International GT Open	TDS Racing	2	0	0	0	0	0	NC†
2016	Blancpain GT Series Endurance Cup	ISR	5	0	0	0	0	1	49th
2016	Blancpain GT Series Sprint Cup	ISR	10	0	2	1	1	21	12th
2017	Blancpain GT Series Endurance Cup	Mercedes-AMG Team HTP Motorsport	5	0	0	0	2	52	**3rd**
2017	Blancpain GT Series Sprint Cup	Mercedes-AMG Team HTP Motorsport	10	3	0	2	3	68	**3rd**
2017	Intercontinental GT Challenge	Mercedes-AMG Team HTP Motorsport	1	0	0	0	0	0	NC
2018	ADAC GT Masters	GRT Grasser Racing Team	8	0	0	0	0	8	34th
2018	Blancpain GT Series Endurance Cup	GRT Grasser Racing Team	5	0	0	0	0	0	NC
2018	Blancpain GT Series Sprint Cup	GRT Grasser Racing Team	8	0	0	0	0	12	17th
2018	IMSA SportsCar Championship - GTD	GRT Grasser Racing Team	1	1	0	0	1	35	45th
2018	24H GT Series - A6	GRT Grasser Racing Team	1	0	0	0	1	0	NC†
2018	Italian GT Championship - GT3	Imperiale Racing	2	0	0	0	1	20	23rd
2019	ADAC GT Masters	Orange1 by GRT Grasser	14	0	1	1	2	89	10th
2019	Blancpain GT Series Endurance Cup	Orange1 FFF Racing Team	4	0	0	0	1	18	14th
2019	International GT Open	Raton Racing by Target	2	0	0	0	0	2	34th
2020	ADAC GT Masters	GRT Grasser Racing Team	14	0	0	0	1	102	8th
2020	IMSA SportsCar Championship - GTD	GRT Grasser Racing Team	2	0	0	1	0	38	39th
2020	British GT Championship	WPI Motorsport	1	0	0	0	0	15	13th
2020	GT World Challenge Europe Endurance Cup	Emil Frey Racing	3	0	0	0	0	4	28th
2020	Intercontinental GT Challenge	Emil Frey Racing	1	0	0	0	0	0	NC
2020	24 Hours of Nürburgring - SP9	Konrad Motorsport	1	0	0	0	0	N/A	DNF
2021	ADAC GT Masters	GRT Grasser Racing Team	14	1	1	1	3	135	7th
2021	IMSA SportsCar Championship - GTD	GRT Grasser Racing Team	10	0	0	2	0	1608	14th
2021	GT World Challenge Europe Endurance Cup	Emil Frey Racing	1	0	0	0	0	0	NC
2021	Intercontinental GT Challenge	Emil Frey Racing	1	0	0	0	0	0	NC
2021	24 Hours of Nürburgring - SP9	Hankook FFF Racing Team	1	0	0	0	0	N/A	DNF
2022	ADAC GT Masters	Emil Frey Racing	14	0	1	1	3	120	5th
2022	Deutsche Tourenwagen Masters	GRT	1	0	0	0	0	0	34th
2022	IMSA SportsCar Championship - GTD	T3 Motorsport North America	1	0	0	0	0	239	57th
2022	Intercontinental GT Challenge	K-PAX Racing	1	0	0	0	0	10	17th
2023	Deutsche Tourenwagen Masters	SSR Performance	16	1	1	0	3	95	11th
2023	GT World Challenge Europe Endurance Cup	K-PAX Racing	5	0	0	0	0	2	26th
2023	GT World Challenge Europe Sprint Cup	VSR	6	0	1	0	0	11.5	12th
2023	IMSA SportsCar Championship - GTD Pro	Iron Lynx	2	0	0	0	0	579	15th
2023	IMSA SportsCar Championship - GTD	Iron Lynx	1	0	0	0	0	190	60th
2024	FIA World Endurance Championship - LMGT3	Iron Lynx	7	0	0	0	1	15	25th
2024	IMSA SportsCar Championship - GTD Pro	Iron Lynx	4	1	0	0	2	1211	16th
2024	GT World Challenge Europe Endurance Cup	GRT Grasser Racing Team	5	1	1	2	2	63	**2nd**
2024	Deutsche Tourenwagen Masters	Lamborghini Team TGI by GRT	8	0	0	0	1	39	17th
2025	IMSA SportsCar Championship - GTD	Forte Racing	1	0	0	0	0	216	74th
2025	GT World Challenge Europe Endurance Cup	VSR	5	0	0	0	0	9	18th
2025	Italian GT Championship Sprint Cup - GT3	VSR	2	0	0	0	1	0	NC†
2025	24 Hours of Le Mans - LMP2	VDS Panis Racing	1	0	0	0	1	N/A	**2nd**
2026	IMSA SportsCar Championship - GTD Pro	Pfaff Motorsports	2	0	0	0	0	532	28th
2026	GT World Challenge Europe Endurance Cup	TGI Team by GRT	5	0	0	0	0	0	NC
2026	Italian GT Championship Sprint Cup - GT3	DL Racing	8	0	0	0	2	30	10th
2026	Italian GT Championship Endurance Cup - GT3	DL Racing	2	0	0	0	1	15	NC†

^{†} Guest driver, ineligible for points.
^{‡} Team standings.

=== Complete Formula Renault 2.0 Italia results ===
(key) (Races in bold indicate pole position) (Races in italics indicate fastest lap)

Year	Entrant	1	2	3	4	5	6	7	8	9	10	11	12	DC	Points
2002	Prema Powerteam	VLL; 14	PER; 7	PER; 22	SPA; WD	MGI; Ret	MNZ; Ret	VAR; 2	IMO; 3	MIS; 5	MUG; 5			8th	76
2003	Prema Powerteam	VLL; 1; 3	**VLL**; **2**; 3	**MGI**; 1	SPA; 1; 23	SPA; 2; 4	**A1R**; **1** Ret	**A1R**; **2**; 1	**MIS**; **1** Ret	**MIS**; **2**; 1	**VAR**; 1	**ADR**; 1	MNZ; 2	1st	242

=== Complete Formula Renault 2.0 Eurocup results ===
(key) (Races in bold indicate pole position) (Races in italics indicate fastest lap)

Year	Entrant	1	2	3	4	5	6	7	8	9	DC	Points
2002	Prema Powerteam	MAG; 31	SIL; 15	JAR; 8	AND; 8	OSC	SPA; 13	IMO; Ret	DON	EST; 5	13th	24
2003	Prema Powerteam	BRN; 1; 9	BRN; 2; 26	ASS; 1; 5	**ASS**; **2** Ret	OSC; 1; 5	OSC; 2; 8	DON; 1; 4	DON; 2; 12		10th	40

=== Complete Formula Renault 2.0 Germany results ===
(key) (Races in bold indicate pole position) (Races in italics indicate fastest lap)

Year	Entrant	1	2	3	4	5	6	7	8	9	10	11	12	13	14	DC	Points
2003	Prema Powerteam	OSC; 1	OSC; 2	HOC; 1 DSQ	HOC; 2 DNS	NÜR; 1	NÜR; 2	SAL; 1	SAL; 2	A1R; 1	A1R; 2	OSC; 1; 9	OSC; 2; 14	LAU; 1	LAU; 2	30th	19

=== Complete Formula 3 Euro Series results ===
(key) (Races in bold indicate pole position) (Races in italics indicate fastest lap)

Year	Entrant	Chassis	Engine	1	2	3	4	5	6	7	8	9	10	11	12	13	14	15	16	17	18	19	20	DC	Points
2004	Prema Powerteam	Dallara F304	Opel	HOC1; 1; 3	HOC1; 2; 19	EST; 1; 8	EST; 2; 7	ADR; 1 DSQ	ADR; 2; 2	PAU; 1; 5	PAU; 2; 6	NOR; 1; 3	NOR; 2; 19†	MAG; 1; 10	MAG; 2; 8	NÜR; 1; 10	NÜR; 2; 8	ZAN; 1; 6	ZAN; 2; 9	BRN; 1; 3	BRN; 2; 6	HOC2; 1; 5	HOC2; 2; 11	8th	48
2005	Prema Powerteam	Dallara F305	Opel	HOC1; 1 Ret	HOC1; 2; 8	PAU; 1 Ret	PAU; 2; 6	SPA; 1; 6	SPA; 2; 6	MON; 1; 5	MON; 2; 3	OSC; 1; 6	OSC; 2; 15	NOR; 1; 4	NOR; 2; 3	NÜR; 1; 5	NÜR; 2; 6	ZAN; 1; 3	ZAN; 2; 6	LAU; 1; 5	LAU; 2; 5	HOC2; 1; 4	HOC2; 2; 5	4th	67

=== Complete GP2 Series results ===
(key) (Races in bold indicate pole position) (Races in italics indicate fastest lap)

Year	Entrant	1	2	3	4	5	6	7	8	9	10	11	12	13	14	15	16	17	18	19	20	21	DC	Points
2006	DAMS	VAL; FEA; 11	VAL; SPR; 14	IMO; FEA; Ret	IMO; SPR; 14	NÜR; FEA; Ret	NÜR; SPR; 15	CAT; FEA; 13	CAT; SPR; Ret	MON; FEA; 2	SIL; FEA; Ret	SIL; SPR; 10	MAG; FEA; Ret	MAG; SPR; 12	HOC; FEA; 14	HOC; SPR; 11	HUN; FEA; 9	HUN; SPR; Ret	IST; FEA; 12	IST; SPR; 8	MNZ; FEA; 15†	MNZ; SPR; 15†	16th	8
2009	DPR	CAT; FEA	CAT; SPR	MON; FEA	MON; SPR	IST; FEA	IST; SPR	SIL; FEA	SIL; SPR	NÜR; FEA; Ret	NÜR; SPR; 16	HUN; FEA; EX	HUN; SPR; 18	VAL; FEA; 15	VAL; SPR; 16†	SPA; FEA; DNQ	SPA; SPR; DNQ	MNZ; FEA	MNZ; SPR	ALG; FEA	ALG; SPR		28th	0

=== Complete Formula Renault 3.5 Series results ===
(key) (Races in bold indicate pole position) (Races in italics indicate fastest lap)

Year	Entrant	1	2	3	4	5	6	7	8	9	10	11	12	13	14	15	16	17	DC	Points
2006	Interwetten.com	ZOL; 1	ZOL; 2	MON; 1	IST; 1	IST; 2	MIS; 1	MIS; 2	SPA; 1	SPA; 2	NÜR; 1	NÜR; 2	DON; 1	DON; 2	LMS; 1	LMS; 2	CAT; 1; 4	CAT; 2; 6	22nd	13

=== American open–wheel racing results ===
(key) (Races in bold indicate pole position)

==== Atlantic Championship ====
Year	Team	1	2	3	4	5	6	7	8	9	10	11	12	Rank	Points
2007	Condor Motorsports	LVG; 5	LBH; 5	HOU; 5	POR1; 5	POR2; 3	CLE; 3	**MTT**; 1	TOR; 1	EDM1; 2	EDM2; 3	SJO; 2	**ROA**; 1	**2nd**	**310**

==== IndyCar Series ====
Year	Team	No.	1	2	3	4	5	6	7	8	9	10	11	12	13	14	15	16	17	18	Rank	Points	Ref
2008	Conquest Racing	34	HMS; 14	STP; 20	MOT^{1} DNP	LBH^{1} 6	KAN	INDY	MIL	TXS	IOW	RIR	WGL	NSH	MOH	EDM	KTY	SNM	DET		29th	71	
2008	A.J. Foyt Racing	41																		CHI; 15	29th	71	

^{1} Run on same day.

Years	Teams	Races	Poles	Wins	Podiums (Non-win)	Top 10s (Non-podium)	Indianapolis 500 Wins	Championships
1	2	4	0	0	0	1	0	0

==== Indy Lights ====
Year	Team	1	2	3	4	5	6	7	8	9	10	11	12	13	14	15	16	Rank	Points
2008	Guthrie Racing	HMS	STP1	STP2	KAN	INDY	MIL	IOW; 11	**WGL1**; 18	WGL2; 17	NSH; 7	MOH1; 2	MOH2; 20	KTY; 14	**SNM1**; 1	SNM2; 5	CHI	**17th**	**220**

=== Complete Superleague Formula results ===
(key) (Races in bold indicate pole position) (Races in italics indicate fastest lap)

Year	Team	1	2	3	4	5	6	7	8	9	10	11	12	13	14	15	16	17	18	19	20	21	22	23	24	Pos	Pts
2008	A.S. Roma FMS International	DON; 1	DON; 2	NÜR; 1	NÜR; 2	ZOL; 1	ZOL; 2	**EST**; **1**; 3	EST; 2; 16	VLL; 1; 15	VLL; 2; 2	JER; 1; 5	JER; 2; 5													5th	307
2009	A.S. Roma Alan Docking Racing	MAG; 1	MAG; 2	ZOL; 1	ZOL; 2	DON; 1	DON; 2	EST; 1; 7	EST; 2; 12	MNZ; 1	MNZ; 2	JAR; 1	JAR; 2													13th	211
2010	CR Flamengo Alpha Team	SIL; 1	SIL; 2	ASS; 1; 2	ASS; 2; 11	MAG; 1; 8	MAG; 2; 13	JAR; 1; 6	JAR; 2; 8	NÜR; 1; 4	NÜR; 2; 9	ZOL; 1	ZOL; 2													6th	540
2010	Olympique Lyonnais LRS Formula													BRH; 1; 12	BRH; 2; 9	ADR; 1	ADR; 2	POR; 1	POR; 2							18th	235
2010	GD Bordeaux Azerti Motorsport																			ORD; 1; 7	ORD; 2; 6	BEI; 1; 2	BEI; 2; 10	NAV; 1; 5	NAV; 2; 9	11th	392

==== Super Final results ====
(key) (Races in bold indicate pole position) (Races in italics indicate fastest lap)

Year	Team	1	2	3	4	5	6	7	8	9	10	11	12
2009	A.S. Roma Alan Docking Racing	MAG	ZOL	DON	EST; DNQ	MNZ	JAR						
2010	CR Flamengo Alpha Team	SIL	ASS; 6	MAG; DNQ	JAR; DNQ	NÜR; 6	ZOL						
2010	Olympique Lyonnais LRS Formula							BRH; DNQ	ADR	POR			
2010	GD Bordeaux Azerti Motorsport										ORD; 2	BEI; C	NAV; 5

=== Complete GT World Challenge Europe results ===
==== GT World Challenge Europe Endurance Cup ====
Year	Team	Car	Class	1	2	3	4	5	6	7	Pos.	Points
2012	Pro GT by Alméras	Porsche 997 GT3 R	Pro-Am	MNZ	SIL	LEC	SPA; Ret	NÜR	NAV		NC	0
2013	Pro GT by Alméras	Porsche 997 GT3 R	Pro-Am	MNZ; Ret	SIL; Ret	LEC; 24	SPA; 6H; 25	SPA; 12H; 37	SPA; 24H; 28	NÜR; 32	36th	5
2014	Pro GT by Alméras	Porsche 997 GT3 R	Pro-Am	MNZ; 19	**SIL**; 24	LEC; 15	SPA; 6H; 13	SPA; 12H; 17	SPA; 24H; 18	NÜR	15th	24
2015	TDS Racing	BMW Z4 GT3	Pro-Am	MNZ; Ret	SIL; 21	LEC; Ret	SPA; 6H; 14	SPA; 12H; 18	SPA; 24H; Ret	NÜR; 31	18th	18
2016	ISR	Audi R8 LMS	Pro-Am	MNZ; 15	**SIL**; 19	LEC; 15	SPA; 6H; 27	SPA; 12H; 9	SPA; 24H; 13	NÜR; 16	2nd	89
2017	Mercedes-AMG Team HTP Motorsport	Mercedes-AMG GT3	Pro	MNZ; 3	SIL; 2	LEC; 40	SPA; 6H; 3	SPA; 12H; 52	SPA; 24H; Ret	CAT; 4	3rd	52
2018	GRT Grasser Racing Team	Lamborghini Huracán GT3	Pro	MNZ; 20	SIL; 17	LEC; 39	SPA; 6H; 14	SPA; 12H; 27	SPA; 24H; Ret	CAT; Ret	NC	0
2019	Orange 1 FFF Racing Team	Lamborghini Huracán GT3 Evo	Pro	MNZ; 17	SIL; 2	LEC; 20	SPA; 6H; 19	SPA; 12H; 16	SPA; 24H; 21	CAT	14th	18
2020	Emil Frey Racing	Lamborghini Huracán GT3 Evo	Pro	IMO; 18	NÜR; Ret	SPA; 6H; 6	SPA; 12H; 11	SPA; 24H; 31	LEC		28th	4
2021	Emil Frey Racing	Lamborghini Huracán GT3 Evo	Pro	MNZ	LEC	SPA; 6H; 56†	SPA; 12H; Ret	SPA; 24H; Ret	NÜR	CAT	NC	0
2023	K-Pax Racing	Lamborghini Huracán GT3 Evo 2	Pro	MNZ; Ret	LEC; 11	SPA; 6H; 17	SPA; 12H; 11	SPA; 24H; 29	NUR; 9	CAT; 44	26th	2
2024	GRT Grasser Racing Team	Lamborghini Huracán GT3 Evo 2	Pro	LEC; 11	SPA; 6H; 17	SPA; 12H; 8	**SPA**; **24H**; 5	NÜR; 1	MNZ; 10	JED; 2	2nd	63
2025	VSR	Lamborghini Huracán GT3 Evo 2	Pro	LEC; 14	MNZ; 9	SPA; 6H; 3	SPA; 12H; 46	SPA; 24H; Ret	NÜR; 15	CAT; 21	18th	9
2026	TGI Team by GRT	Lamborghini Temerario GT3	Pro	LEC; 39	MNZ; Ret	SPA; 6H; 60	SPA; 12H; 60†	SPA; 24H; Ret	NÜR; 18	ALG; 51	NC	0

==== GT World Challenge Europe Sprint Cup results ====
Year	Team	Car	Class	1	2	3	4	5	6	7	8	9	10	Pos.	Points
2016	ISR	Audi R8 LMS	Pro	MIS; QR; 31	MIS; CR; 35	**BRH**; **QR**; 2	BRH; CR; 5	NÜR; QR; 4	NÜR; CR; 25	HUN; QR; 27	HUN; CR; 24	**CAT**; **QR**; 26	CAT; CR; 17	12th	21
2017	Mercedes-AMG Team HTP Motorsport	Mercedes-AMG GT3	Pro	MIS; QR; 1	MIS; CR; 1	BRH; QR; 23	BRH; CR; 6	ZOL; QR; 16	ZOL; CR; 6	HUN; QR; 4	HUN; CR; 6	NÜR; QR; 1	NÜR; CR; Ret	3rd	68
2018	GRT Grasser Racing Team	Lamborghini Huracán GT3	Pro	ZOL; 1; 20	ZOL; 2 Ret	BRH; 1; 13	BRH; 2; 7	MIS; 1; 17	MIS; 2; 7	HUN; 1; 13	HUN; 2; 5	NÜR; 1	NÜR; 2	17th	12
2023	VSR	Lamborghini Huracán GT3 Evo 2	Pro	BRH; 1; 6	BRH; 2; 25†	MIS; 1; 7	MIS; 2; 8	**HOC**; **1**; 32†	HOC; 2; 9	VAL; 1	VAL; 2	ZAN; 1	ZAN; 2	12th	11.5

^{†} Driver did not finish the race, but was classified as he completed over 90% of the race distance.

=== Complete European Le Mans Series results ===
Year	Entrant	Class	Car	Engine	1	2	3	4	5	Pos.	Points
2014	Pro GT by Alméras	GTC	Porsche 997 GT3 R	Porsche 4.0 L Flat-6	SIL; 8	IMO; 11	RBR; 6	LEC; 7	EST	14th	18.5
2015	TDS Racing	GTC	BMW Z4 GT3	BMW 4.4 L V8	**SIL**; 1	IMO; 4	RBR; 2	**LEC**; 1	**EST**; 2	1st	101

=== Complete IMSA SportsCar Championship results ===
(key) (Races in bold indicate pole position; results in italics indicate fastest lap)

Year	Team	Class	Make	Engine	1	2	3	4	5	6	7	8	9	10	11	12	Pos.	Points
2018	GRT Grasser Racing Team	GTD	Lamborghini Huracán GT3	Lamborghini 5.2 L V10	DAY; 1	SEB	MOH	BEL	WGL	MOS	LIM	ELK	VIR	LGA	PET		45th	35
2020	GRT Grasser Racing Team	GTD	Lamborghini Huracán GT3 Evo	Lamborghini 5.2 L V10	DAY; 14	DAY	SEB	ELK	VIR	ATL; 8	MOH	CLT	PET	LGA	SEB; 10		33rd	61
2021	GRT Grasser Racing Team	GTD	Lamborghini Huracán GT3 Evo	Lamborghini 5.2 L V10	DAY; 19	SEB; 13	MOH	DET	WGL; 13	WGL; 11	LIM; 7	ELK; 15	LGA	LBH; 17	VIR; 9	PET; 13	74th	160
2022	T3 Motorsport North America	GTD	Lamborghini Huracán GT3 Evo	Lamborghini 5.2 L V10	DAY; 8	SEB	LBH	LGA	MOH	DET	WGL	MOS	LIM	ELK	VIR	PET	57th	239
2023	Iron Lynx	GTD	Lamborghini Huracán GT3 Evo 2	Lamborghini 5.2 L V10	DAY; 12												60th	190
2023	Iron Lynx	GTD Pro	Lamborghini Huracán GT3 Evo 2	Lamborghini 5.2 L V10		SEB; 4	LBH	MON	WGL	MOS	LIM	ELK	VIR	IMS	PET; 6		15th	579
2024	Iron Lynx	GTD Pro	Lamborghini Huracán GT3 Evo 2	Lamborghini 5.2 L V10	DAY; 7	SEB; 3	LGA	DET	WGL; 9	MOS	ELK	VIR	IMS	PET; 1			16th	1211
2025	Forte Racing	GTD	Lamborghini Huracán GT3 Evo 2	Lamborghini 5.2 L V10	DAY; 12	SEB	LBH	LGA	WGL	MOS	ELK	VIR	IMS	PET			74th	216
2026	Pfaff Motorsports	GTD Pro	Lamborghini Temerario GT3	Lamborghini L411 4.0 L Turbo V8	DAY	SEB; 10	LGA	DET	WGL	MOS	ELK	VIR	IMS	PET; 4			28th	532

=== Complete ADAC GT Masters results ===
(key) (Races in bold indicate pole position; races in italics indicate fastest lap)

Year	Team	Car	1	2	3	4	5	6	7	8	9	10	11	12	13	14	Pos.	Points
2018	GRT Grasser Racing Team	Lamborghini Huracán GT3	OSC; 1 DSQ	OSC; 2; 23	MST; 1 Ret	MST; 2 Ret	RBR; 1; 29	RBR; 2; 6	NÜR; 1; 24	NÜR; 2; 22	ZAN; 1	ZAN; 2	SAC; 1	SAC; 2	HOC; 1	HOC; 2	34th	8
2019	Orange1 by GRT Grasser	Lamborghini Huracán GT3 Evo	OSC; 1; 20	OSC; 2; 3	MST; 1; 22	**MST**; **2**; 2	RBR; 1 Ret	RBR; 2; 7	ZAN; 1; 10	ZAN; 2; 4	NÜR; 1; 17	**NÜR**; **2** DSQ	HOC; 1; 12	HOC; 2; 3	SAC; 1; 11	SAC; 2; 22	10th	89
2020	GRT Grasser Racing Team	Lamborghini Huracán GT3 Evo	LAU; 1; 5	LAU; 2; 27†	NÜR; 1; 10	NÜR; 2; 3	HOC; 1; 5	HOC; 2; 8	SAC; 1; 29†	SAC; 2; 10	RBR; 1; 4	RBR; 2; 3	LAU; 1; 13	LAU; 2; 8	OSC; 1; 12	OSC; 2; 22	8th	102
2021	GRT Grasser Racing Team	Lamborghini Huracán GT3 Evo	OSC; 1; 18	OSC; 2 Ret	RBR; 1; 7	RBR; 2; 5	ZAN; 1; 17	ZAN; 2; 3	LAU; 1; 8	LAU; 2; 7	SAC; 1 Ret	SAC; 2; 4	HOC; 1; 6	**HOC**; **2**; 1	NÜR; 1; 7	NÜR; 2; 3	7th	135
2022	Emil Frey Racing	Lamborghini Huracán GT3 Evo	**OSC**; **1**; 2^{1}	OSC; 2; 13	RBR; 1; 10	RBR; 2; 17	ZAN; 1; 8	ZAN; 2; 3^{3}	NÜR; 1; 15	NÜR; 2; 8	LAU; 1; 6	LAU; 2; 14	SAC; 1; 9	SAC; 2; 6	HOC; 1; 2	HOC; 2; 11	5th	120

=== Complete Deutsche Tourenwagen Masters results ===
(key) (Races in bold indicate pole position) (Races in italics indicate fastest lap)

Year	Team	Car	1	2	3	4	5	6	7	8	9	10	11	12	13	14	15	16	Pos	Points
2022	GRT	Lamborghini Huracán GT3 Evo	ALG; 1	ALG; 2	LAU; 1	LAU; 2	IMO; 1	IMO; 2	NOR; 1 Ret	NOR; 2 DNS	NÜR; 1	NÜR; 2	SPA; 1	SPA; 2	RBR; 1	RBR; 2	HOC; 1	HOC; 2	34th	0
2023	SSR Performance	Lamborghini Huracán GT3 Evo 2	**OSC**; **1**; 1^{1}	OSC; 2; 12	ZAN; 1; 3	ZAN; 2; 13	NOR; 1; 11	NOR; 2; 12	NÜR; 1; 23	NÜR; 2; 10	LAU; 1 Ret	LAU; 2 Ret	SAC; 1; 11	SAC; 2; 3	RBR; 1; 19	RBR; 2; 13	HOC; 1; 14	HOC; 2; 14	11th	95
2024	Lamborghini Team TGI by GRT	Lamborghini Huracán GT3 Evo 2	OSC; 1	OSC; 2	LAU; 1	LAU; 2	ZAN; 1	ZAN; 2	NOR; 1; 2	NOR; 2; 13	NÜR; 1; 14	NÜR; 2; 10	SAC; 1	SAC; 2	RBR; 1; 16	RBR; 2; 9	HOC; 1 Ret	HOC; 2; 15	17th	39

=== Complete FIA World Endurance Championship results ===
(key) (Races in bold indicate pole position; races in italics indicate fastest lap)

Year	Entrant	Class	Chassis	Engine	1	2	3	4	5	6	7	8	Rank	Points
2024	Iron Lynx	LMGT3	Lamborghini Huracán GT3 Evo 2	Lamborghini DGF 5.2 L V10	QAT; 12	IMO; 13	SPA; 3	LMS; 13	SÃO; 14	COA; 12	FUJ; 13	BHR	25th	15

=== Complete 24 Hours of Le Mans results ===
Year	Team	Co-Drivers	Car	Class	Laps	Pos.	Class Pos.
2024	(Italy) Iron Lynx	(Italy) Matteo Cressoni (Italy) Claudio Schiavoni	Lamborghini Huracán GT3 Evo 2	LMGT3	258	44th	16th
2025	(France) VDS Panis Racing	(United Kingdom) Oliver Gray (France) Esteban Masson	Oreca 07-Gibson	LMP2	367	19th	**2nd**

Sporting positions
Preceded by José María López	Italian Formula Renault champion 2003	Succeeded by Pastor Maldonado
