= Girondins de Bordeaux (Superleague Formula team) =

GD Bordeaux SF Racing Team
Founded	2010
Country	France
Driver(s)	Franck Montagny (2010); Jaap van Lagen (2010); Celso Míguez (2010); Franck Perera (2010)
First race	2010 Silverstone
Last race	2010 Navarra
Rounds	11
Ch'ships	0
Total points	372 (including Super Finals)
2010 position	11th (372 pts)
Races / Poles / Wins / Podiums / F. Laps; 21 / 0 / 1 / 3 / 1
NOTE - Data not including Super Finals

Girondins de Bordeaux Superleague Formula team was the racing team of FC Girondins de Bordeaux, a football team that competes in France in the Régional 1. The Girondins de Bordeaux racing team competed in the Superleague Formula. It was operated by Barazi-Epsilon for their debut season in 2010, the car itself was driven by Franck Montagny. In 2011, it was driven by Tristan Gommendy until the series collapsed.

== Record ==
(key)

=== 2010 ===
Operator(s)	Driver(s)	1			2			3			4			5			6			7			8	9			10			NC			11			Points	Rank
Operator(s)	Driver(s)	SIL			ASS			MAG			JAR			NÜR			ZOL			BRH			ADR	POR			ORD			BEI			NAV			Points	Rank
Barazi-Epsilon	(France) Franck Montagny	DN	8	X	14	3	X	10	14	X	17	1	X	15	2	X				5	14	X														372	11th
Barazi-Epsilon	(Netherlands) Jaap van Lagen																12	10	X																	372	11th
Drivex	(Spain) Celso Míguez																							18	14	X										372	11th
Azerti Motorsport	(France) Franck Perera																										7	6	2	2	10	C	5	9	5	372	11th

== Gallery ==
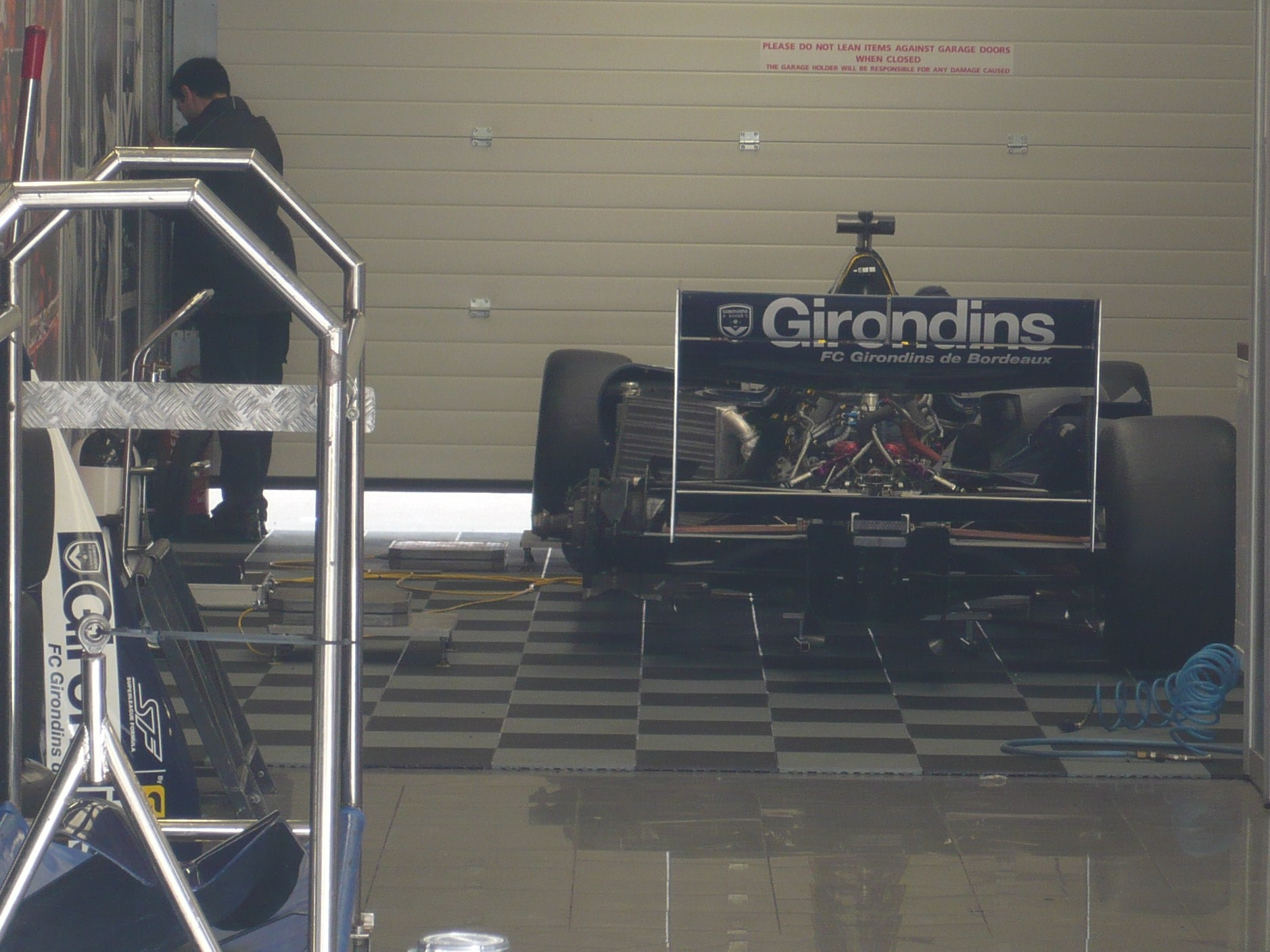
The GD Bordeaux car in its pit garage at Silverstone Circuit (2010)

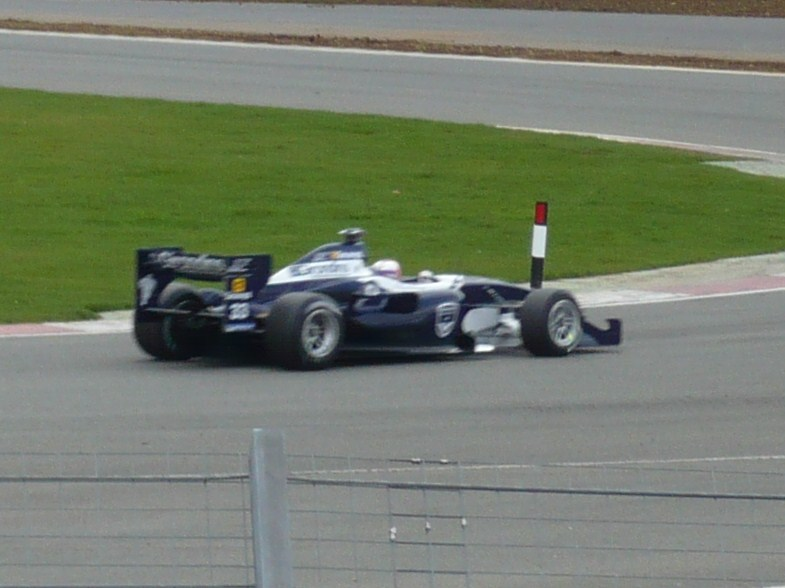
GD Bordeaux car on track at Silverstone Circuit (2010)

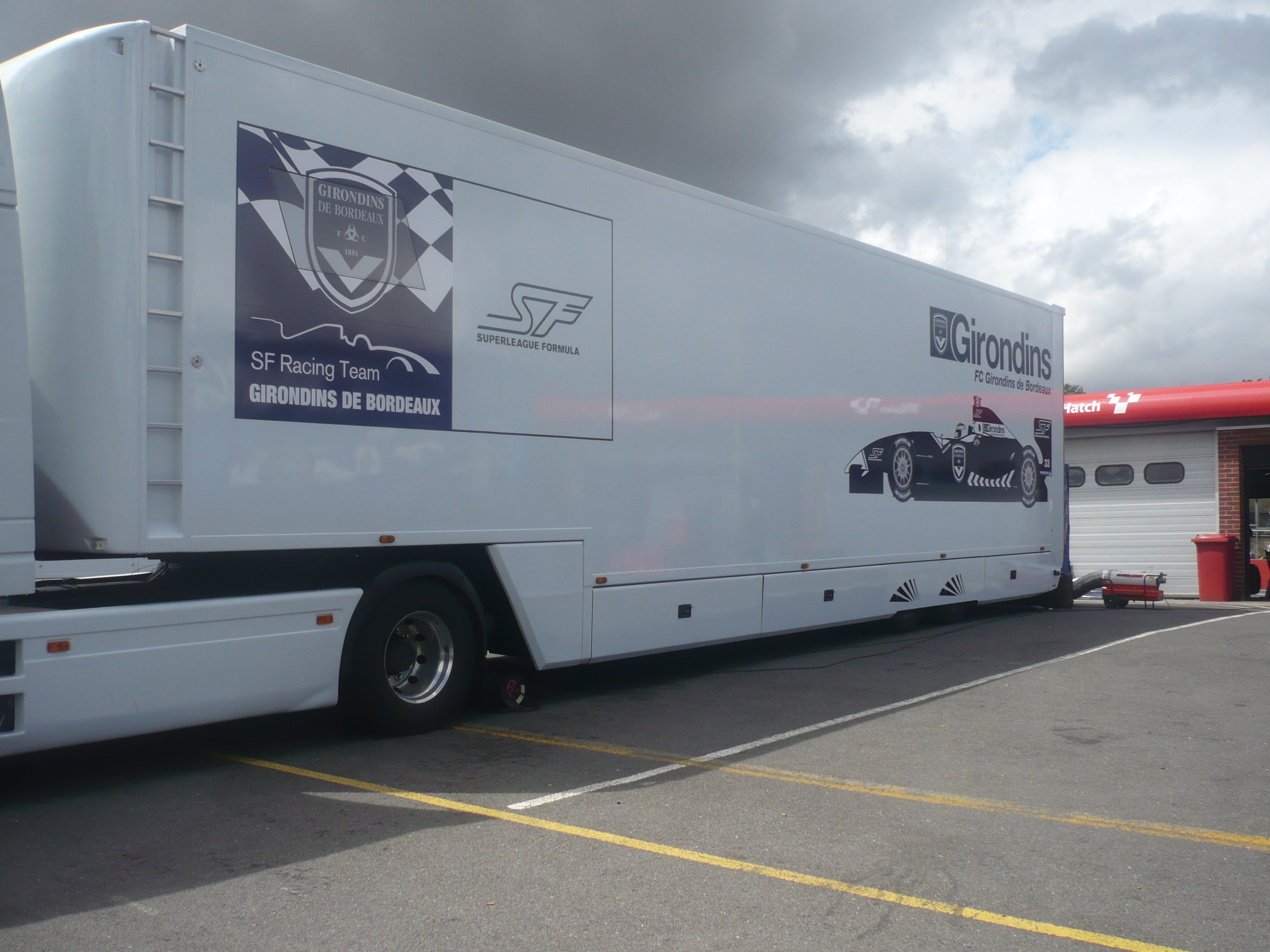
GD Bordeaux team truck at Brands Hatch (2010)
