= Tristan Gommendy =

French professional racing driver

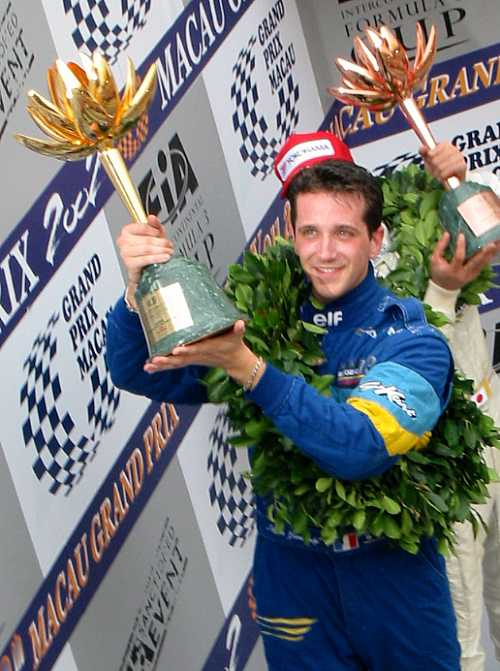
- Gommendy on the podium after winning the 2002 Macau Grand Prix
- Nationality: (France) French
- Born: Tristan Emmanuel Benoît Gommendy; 4 January 1979 (age 47) Le Chesnay, Yvelines
- Categorisation: FIA Platinum

24 Hours of Le Mans career
- Years: 2003 – 2004, 2010, 2013 –
- Teams: Racing for Holland; Gerard Welter
- Best finish: 6th (2014)
- Class wins: 0

Tristan Emmanuel Benoît Gommendy (born 4 January 1979) is a French professional racing driver.

In single-seater racing, Gommendy won the 2002 Macau Grand Prix and French F3, and was a front-runner in the Formula Renault 3.5 Series. He spent a season in Champ Car in 2007, and won twice in Superleague Formula between 2008 and 2011.

Gommendy dedicated the peak of his career to endurance racing, competing in the European Le Mans Series between 2014 and 2021. He finished third overall at the 2017 24 Hours of Le Mans driving a Jackie Chan DC Racing LMP2 car, and topped qualifying twice—in 2014 with TDS, and in 2019 with Graff. Gommendy retired from the sport in 2022 after two seasons with Duqueine.

Gommendy currently works for Prema Racing as sporting director.

== Racing career ==
=== Early career ===
Born in Le Chesnay, Yvelines, Gommendy began his professional career in French Formula Three in 2000. He won the prestigious Macau Grand Prix in 2002 with a late pass on Heikki Kovalainen, and also won the French F3 Championship that year. In 2003, he drove in Eurocup Formula Renault V6 and finished third. He moved to its parent series, the World Series by Nissan, in 2004 and finished fifth, and another season in 2005 he finished fourth.

=== GP2, Champ Car, and Superleague Formula ===
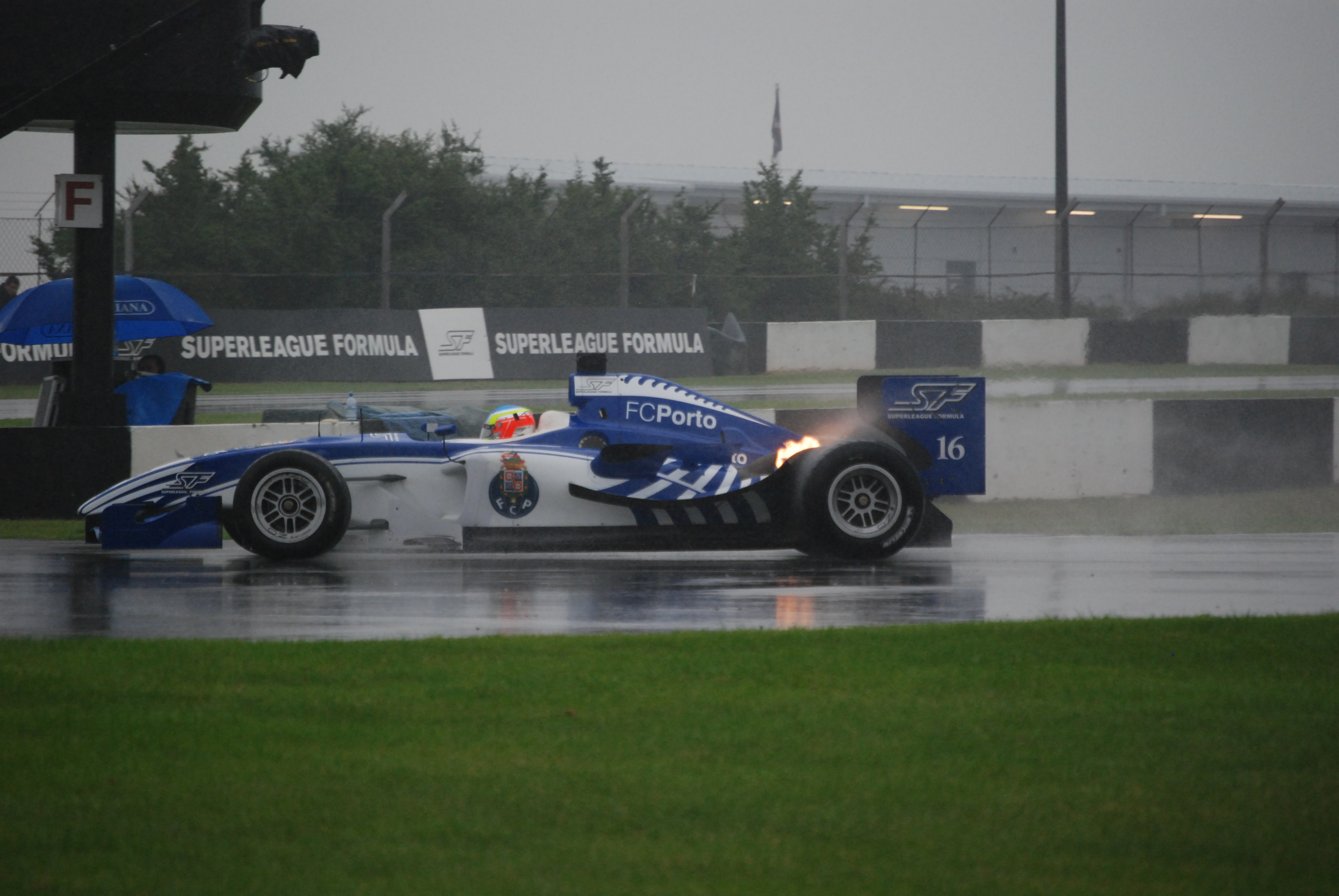
Tristan Gommendy driving the FC Porto car at Donington Park during the 2008 Superleague Formula season.

In 2006, Gommendy drove in the first five rounds GP2 Series for the iSport International team and was on front row for his first race in front of Lewis Hamilton. He finished 20th in points, scoring a pair of fifth places at Circuit de Catalunya.

On 8 March 2007, it was announced that Gommendy had been signed to drive for PKV Racing in the 2007 Champ Car season as a teammate to Neel Jani. At Houston and Long Beach, he led several laps before breaking down with few laps to go. Later at Circuit Mont-Tremblant, Gommendy won the pole and track record. He participated in twelve of the first thirteen races and finished 12th in points with a best finish of fourth in his final start at TT Circuit Assen.

With Champ Car merging with IndyCar the following year, resulting in fewer available race seats, Gommendy joined Superleague Formula driving for F.C. Porto, winning a race at ACI Vallelunga Circuit in 2008 and Donington Park in 2009. Gommendy continued in Superleague Formula with other teams and little success until the series shut down mid-way through the 2011 season.

=== Sports cars ===
Gommendy made his first 24 Hours of Le Mans start in 2003. His team finished the race for the first time in 2010, driving a Welter Racing LMP2 entry to eighth in class. He competed in the LMP2 class of the 2009 Le Mans Series with Welter Racing.

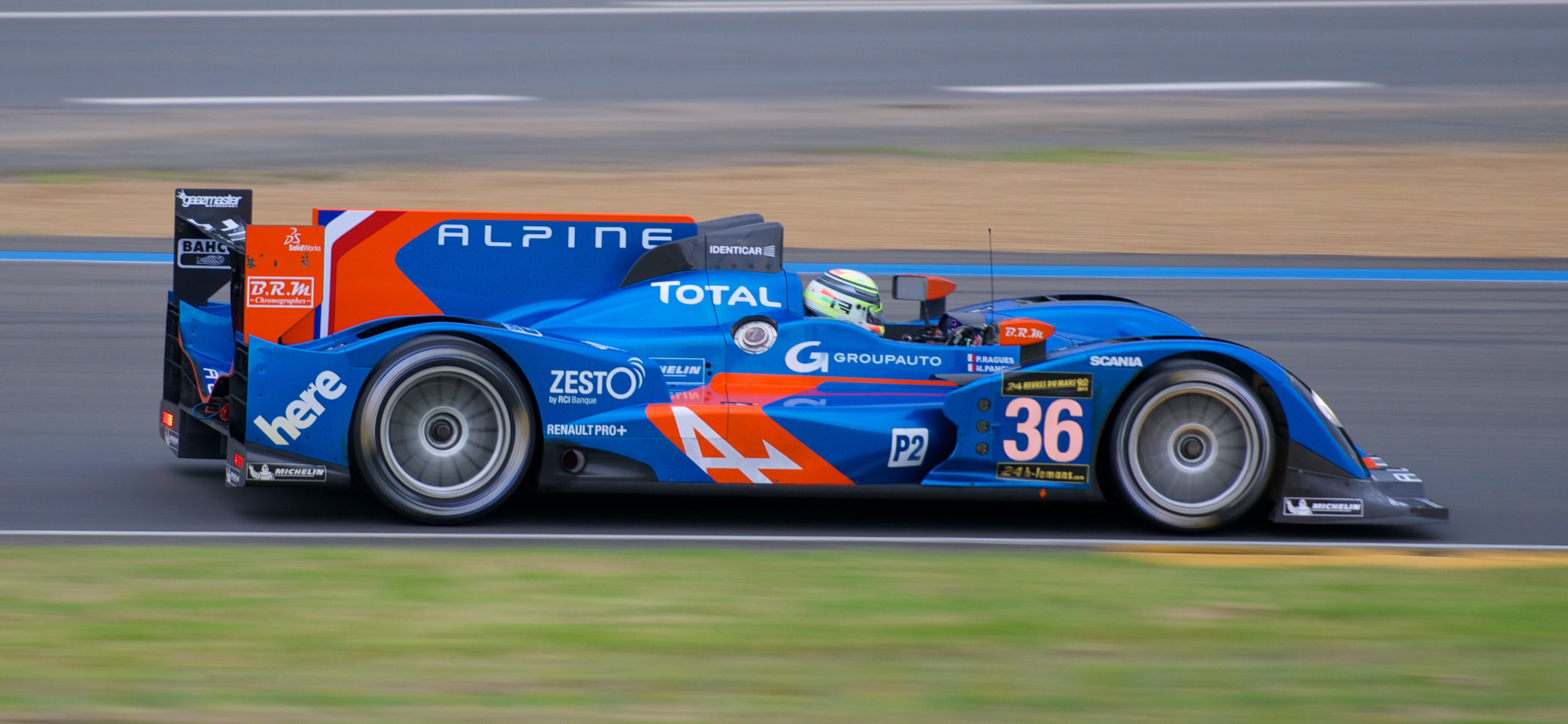
Gommendy racing for Signatech Alpine at the 2013 24 Hours of Le Mans.

In 2011, following the dissolution of Superleague Formula, Gommendy was largely out of racing until he appeared in the 2013 24 Hours of Le Mans for Signatech in their LMP2 Alpine A450. The team finished 14th overall and eighth in class. He raced at the LMP2 class 2014 European Le Mans Series for Thiriet by TDS Racing, winning at Silverstone. He remained at the team for the 2015 European Le Mans Series, claiming a win at Imola and a second place at Red Bull Ring. For the 2016 European Le Mans Series, he switched to Eurasia Motorsport, finishing second at Red Bull Ring.

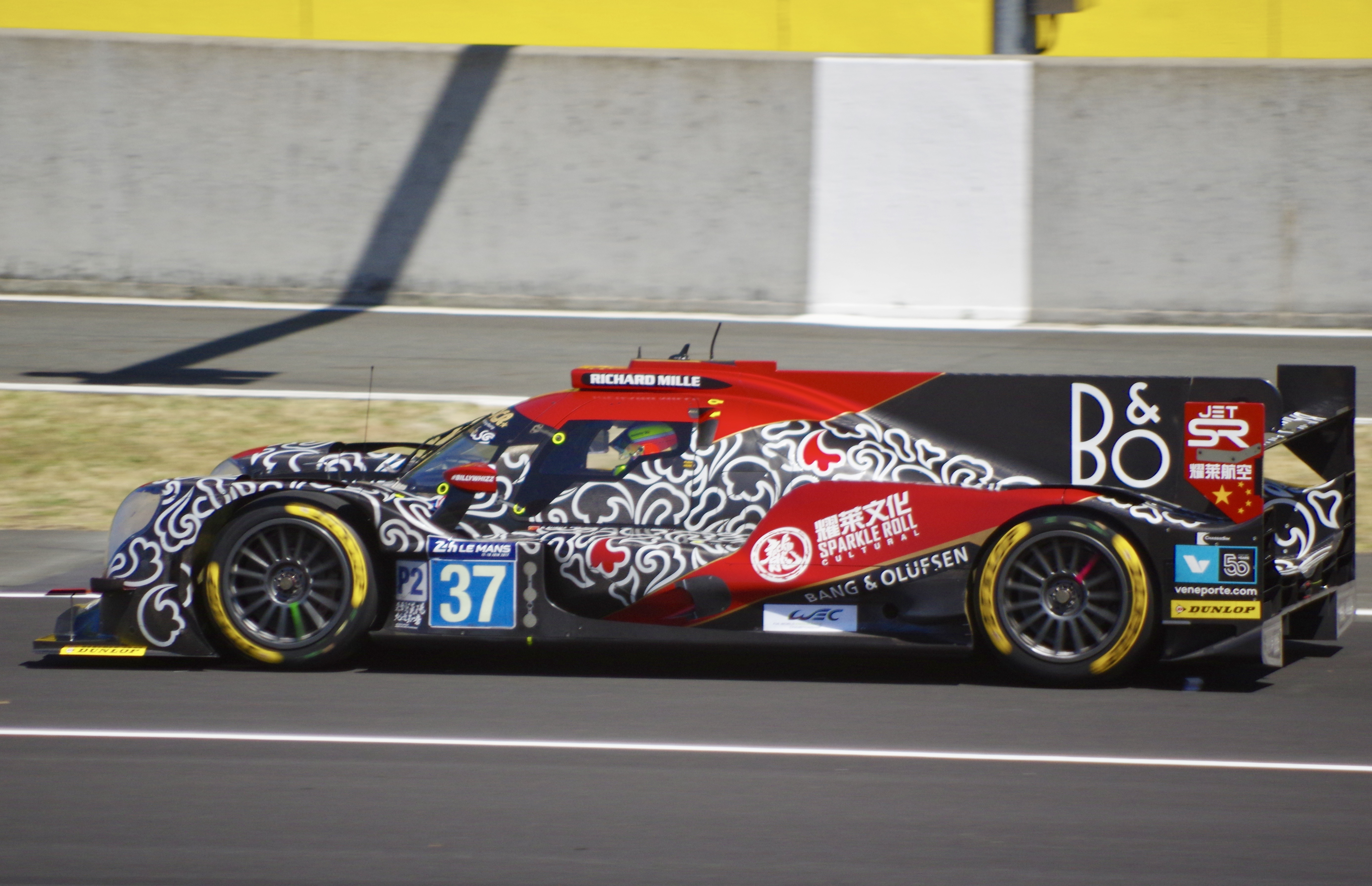
Gommendy's Jackie Chan DC Racing LMP2 car that finished third overall at the 2017 24 Hours of Le Mans.

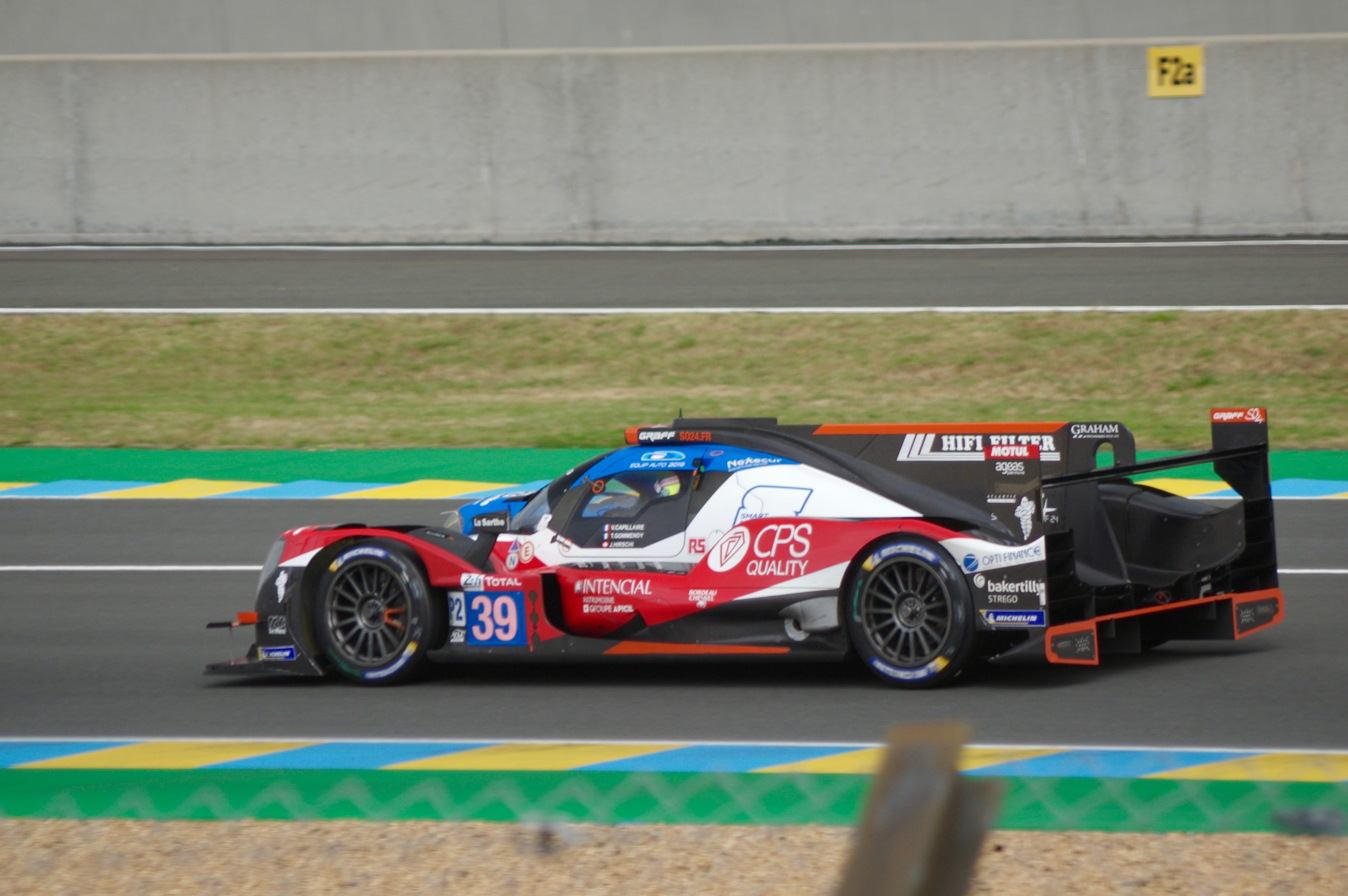
Gommendy was on pole at Le Mans in 2014 with TDS. He repeated the feat in 2019 for Graff, but lost it after teammate Vincent Capillaire missed the weighbridge.

Jackie Chan DC Racing hired Gommendy to compete at the 2017 FIA World Endurance Championship, again in the LMP2 class. He finished third overall at the 2017 24 Hours of Le Mans.

=== Return to IndyCar ===
On 11 September 2017, it was announced that Gommendy would return to American open-wheel racing, making his Indianapolis 500 debut at the 2018 Indianapolis 500, driving for Schmidt Peterson Motorsports in a partnership with former Larrousse F1 team boss Didier Calmels. However, the deal eventually fell through.

=== Management ===
Since his retirement from the sport, Gommendy has worked as a director and team manager at ART Grand Prix (2023–2024) and Prema Racing (2025–present).

== Racing record ==
=== Career summary ===
| Season | Series | Team | Races | Wins | Poles | F/Laps | Podiums | Points | Position |
|---|---|---|---|---|---|---|---|---|---|
| 1999 | French Formula Renault | Mygale | 21 | 0 | 0 | 0 | 3 | 116 | 5th |
| 2000 | French Formula Three | ASM Elf | 11 | 0 | 0 | 0 | 0 | 54 | 11th |
| 2000 | British Formula 3 Championship | ASM Elf | 1 | 0 | 0 | 0 | 0 | 0 | NC† |
| 2000 | European Formula 3 Cup | ASM Elf | 1 | 0 | 0 | 0 | 0 | N/A | DNF |
| 2000 | Masters of Formula 3 | ASM Elf | 1 | 0 | 0 | 0 | 0 | N/A | 29th |
| 2001 | French Formula Three | ASM Elf | 11 | 0 | 1 | 0 | 2 | 94 | 6th |
| 2001 | European Formula 3 Cup | ASM Elf | 1 | 0 | 0 | 0 | 0 | N/A | DNF |
| 2001 | Macau Grand Prix | ASM Elf | 1 | 0 | 0 | 0 | 0 | N/A | 14th |
| 2001 | Masters of Formula 3 | ASM Elf | 1 | 0 | 0 | 0 | 0 | N/A | 16th |
| 2001 | Korea Super Prix | ASM Elf | 1 | 0 | 0 | 0 | 0 | N/A | 10th |
| 2002 | French Formula Three | ASM Formule 3 | 14 | 5 | 10 | 7 | 10 | 202 | **1st** |
| 2002 | European Formula 3 Cup | ASM Formule 3 | 1 | 0 | 0 | 0 | 0 | N/A | DNF |
| 2002 | Macau Grand Prix | ASM Formule 3 | 1 | 1 | 0 | 1 | 1 | N/A | **1st** |
| 2002 | Masters of Formula 3 | ASM Formule 3 | 1 | 0 | 0 | 0 | 1 | N/A | **3rd** |
| 2002 | Korea Super Prix | ASM Formule 3 | 1 | 0 | 0 | 0 | 0 | N/A | 17th |
| 2003 | Formula Renault V6 Eurocup | ARTA-Signature | 18 | 1 | 3 | 3 | 8 | 286 | 4th |
| 2003 | 24 Hours of Le Mans - LMP900 | Racing for Holland | 1 | 0 | 0 | 0 | 0 | N/A | DNF |
| 2004 | World Series by Nissan | Saulnier Racing | 16 | 0 | 0 | 0 | 5 | 96 | 5th |
| 2004 | 24 Hours of Le Mans - LMP2 | Gerard Welter | 1 | 0 | 0 | 0 | 0 | N/A | DNF |
| 2005 | Formula Renault 3.5 Series | KTR | 17 | 1 | 1 | 3 | 5 | 97 | 4th |
| 2006 | GP2 Series | iSport International | 9 | 0 | 0 | 0 | 0 | 6 | 20th |
| 2006 | Formula Renault 3.5 Series | Pons Racing | 4 | 0 | 1 | 0 | 1 | 16 | 19th |
| 2007 | Champ Car World Series | PKV Racing | 11 | 0 | 1 | 0 | 0 | 140 | 12th |
| 2008 | Superleague Formula | F.C. Porto | 11 | 1 | 0 | 0 | 2 | 277 | 7th |
| 2008 | Le Mans Series - LMP2 | WR Salini | 1 | 0 | 0 | 0 | 0 | 0 | NC |
| 2009 | Superleague Formula | F.C. Porto | 12 | 1 | 0 | 2 | 1 | 302 | 5th |
| 2009 | Le Mans Series - LMP2 | WR Salini | 4 | 0 | 0 | 0 | 0 | 3 | 15th |
| 2010 | Superleague Formula | Galatasaray S.K. | 18 | 0 | 0 | 0 | 2 | 358 | 13th |
| 2010 | Superleague Formula | Olympique Lyonnais | 9 | 0 | 0 | 1 | 1 | 235 | 18th |
| 2010 | Le Mans Series - LMP2 | WR Salini | 1 | 0 | 0 | 0 | 0 | 0 | NC |
| 2010 | 24 Hours of Le Mans - LMP2 | Gerard Welter | 1 | 0 | 0 | 0 | 0 | N/A | 8th |
| 2011 | Superleague Formula | France - Girondins de Bordeaux | 4 | 0 | 1 | 1 | 0 | 52 | 13th |
| 2013 | 24 Hours of Le Mans - LMP2 | Signatech-Alpine | 1 | 0 | 0 | 0 | 0 | 0 | 8th |
| 2014 | European Le Mans Series - LMP2 | Thiriet by TDS Racing | 5 | 1 | 0 | 0 | 1 | 35 | 8th |
| 2014 | 24 Hours of Le Mans - LMP2 | Thiriet by TDS Racing | 1 | 0 | 1 | 0 | 1 | N/A | **2nd** |
| 2014 | 24 Hours of Nürburgring - SP3T | Philippe Salini | 1 | 0 | ? | ? | 0 | N/A | DNF |
| 2015 | European Le Mans Series - LMP2 | Thiriet by TDS Racing | 4 | 1 | 0 | 1 | 3 | 66 | 4th |
| 2015 | 24 Hours of Le Mans - LMP2 | Thiriet by TDS Racing | 1 | 0 | 0 | 0 | 0 | N/A | DNF |
| 2015–16 | Asian Le Mans Series - LMP2 | Eurasia Motorsport | 1 | 0 | 0 | 0 | 1 | 18 | 9th |
| 2016 | European Le Mans Series - LMP2 | Eurasia Motorsport | 6 | 0 | 0 | 0 | 1 | 10 | 9th |
| 2016 | 24 Hours of Le Mans - LMP2 | Eurasia Motorsport | 1 | 0 | 0 | 0 | 0 | N/A | 5th |
| 2017 | FIA World Endurance Championship - LMP2 | Jackie Chan DC Racing | 9 | 0 | 0 | 0 | 1 | 77 | 11th |
| 2017 | 24 Hours of Le Mans - LMP2 | Jackie Chan DC Racing | 1 | 0 | 0 | 0 | 1 | N/A | **2nd** |
| 2018 | European Le Mans Series - LMP2 | Graff | 6 | 0 | 0 | 0 | 0 | 23 | 14th |
| 2018 | 24 Hours of Le Mans - LMP2 | Graff-SO24 | 1 | 0 | 0 | 0 | 1 | N/A | **2nd** |
| 2019 | European Le Mans Series - LMP2 | Graff | 6 | 0 | 0 | 0 | 4 | 83 | **3rd** |
| 2020 | European Le Mans Series - LMP2 | Duqueine Engineering | 5 | 0 | 0 | 0 | 1 | 38 | 7th |
| 2021 | European Le Mans Series - LMP2 | Duqueine Team | 6 | 0 | 0 | 0 | 1 | 52 | 7th |

† Ineligible for points.

=== Complete French Formula Three Championship results ===
(key) (Races in bold indicate pole position) (Races in italics indicate fastest lap)

| Year | Entrant | Chassis | Engine | 1 | 2 | 3 | 4 | 5 | 6 | 7 | 8 | 9 | 10 | 11 | 12 | 13 | 14 | DC | Points |
|---|---|---|---|---|---|---|---|---|---|---|---|---|---|---|---|---|---|---|---|
| 2000 | ASM | Dallara F399 | Renault | NOG; 1; 9 | NOG; 2; 10 | LÉD; 1 DNS | LÉD; 2 DNS | PAU; Ret | VDV; 1; 12 | VDV; 2 Ret | SPA; 1; 9 | SPA; 2; 10 | ALB; 5 | LMS; 12 | NIM; DNS | | | 11th | 54 |
| 2001 | ASM | Dallara F399 | Renault | NOG; 1; 4 | **NOG**; **2** Ret | LÉD; 6 | MAG; Ret | VDV; 4 | SPA; 1; 5 | SPA; 2; 6 | CRT; 11 | ALB; 2 | LMS; 5 | MAG; 3 | | | | 6th | 94 |
| 2002 | ASM | Dallara F302 | Renault | **NOG**; **1**; 2 | NOG; 2; 9 | **LÉD**; **1**; 1 | **LÉD**; **2** Ret | **DIJ**; **1**; 3 | **DIJ**; **2**; 7 | CRT; 1; 3 | **CRT**; **2**; 5 | **ALB**; **1**; 1 | **ALB**; **2**; 1 | LMS; 1; 2 | **LMS**; **2**; 1 | **MAG**; **1**; 1 | MAG; 2; 2 | 1st | 202 |

=== Complete Formula Renault V6 Eurocup results ===
(key) (Races in bold indicate pole position) (Races in italics indicate fastest lap)

| Year | Entrant | 1 | 2 | 3 | 4 | 5 | 6 | 7 | 8 | 9 | 10 | 11 | 12 | 13 | 14 | 15 | 16 | 17 | 18 | DC | Points |
|---|---|---|---|---|---|---|---|---|---|---|---|---|---|---|---|---|---|---|---|---|---|
| 2003 | ARTA-Signature | CAT; 1; 6 | CAT; 2; 4 | **MAG**; **1**; 17† | **MAG**; **2**; 2 | MON; 13 | DON; 1; 2 | DON; 2; 2 | SPA1; DSQ | SPA2; 1; 4 | **SPA2**; **2**; 2 | AND; 1; 4 | AND; 2; 1 | OSC; 1 Ret | OSC; 2; 3 | EST; 1; 2 | EST; 2; 3 | MNZ; 1; 6 | MNZ; 2; 3 | 4th | 286 |

=== Complete World Series by Nissan/Formula Renault 3.5 Series results ===
(key) (Races in bold indicate pole position) (Races in italics indicate fastest lap)

| Year | Entrant | 1 | 2 | 3 | 4 | 5 | 6 | 7 | 8 | 9 | 10 | 11 | 12 | 13 | 14 | 15 | 16 | 17 | 18 | DC | Points |
|---|---|---|---|---|---|---|---|---|---|---|---|---|---|---|---|---|---|---|---|---|---|
| 2004 | Saulnier Racing | JAR; 1; 12 | JAR; 2; 5 | ZOL; 1 Ret | ZOL; 2; 3 | MAG; 1; 5 | MAG; 2; 2 | VAL; 1; 7 | VAL; 2; 3 | LAU; 1; 3 | LAU; 2; 8 | EST; 1; 4 | EST; 2; 5 | CAT; 1; 4 | CAT; 2; 3 | VAL; 1; 9 | VAL; 2; 10 | JER; 1; 6 | JER; 2; 8 | 5th | 101 |
| 2005 | KTR | ZOL; 1; 4 | ZOL; 2 Ret | MON; 1; 4 | VAL; 1; 7 | VAL; 2; 1 | LMS; 1; 15 | LMS; 2; 16 | BIL; 1; 3 | BIL; 2; 19† | OSC; 1; 2 | OSC; 2; 2 | DON; 1 NC | DON; 2; 4 | **EST**; **1**; 3 | EST; 2 Ret | MNZ; 1; 5 | MNZ; 2; 16 | | 4th | 96 |
| 2006 | Pons Racing | ZOL; 1 | ZOL; 2 | MON; 1 | IST; 1 | IST; 2 | MIS; 1 | MIS; 2 | SPA; 1 | SPA; 2 | NÜR; 1 | NÜR; 2 | DON; 1 | DON; 2 | LMS; 1; 8 | **LMS**; **2**; 2 | CAT; 1 NC | CAT; 2 Ret | | 19th | 16 |

^{†} Driver did not finish the race, but was classified as he completed more than 90% of the race distance.

=== Complete GP2 Series results ===
(key) (Races in bold indicate pole position) (Races in italics indicate fastest lap)

| Year | Entrant | 1 | 2 | 3 | 4 | 5 | 6 | 7 | 8 | 9 | 10 | 11 | 12 | 13 | 14 | 15 | 16 | 17 | 18 | 19 | 20 | 21 | DC | Points |
|---|---|---|---|---|---|---|---|---|---|---|---|---|---|---|---|---|---|---|---|---|---|---|---|---|
| 2006 | iSport International | VAL; FEA; Ret | VAL; SPR; 11 | IMO; FEA; Ret | IMO; SPR; 17 | NÜR; FEA; 13 | NÜR; SPR; 12 | CAT; FEA; 5 | CAT; SPR; 5 | MON; FEA; Ret | SIL; FEA | SIL; SPR | MAG; FEA | MAG; SPR | HOC; FEA | HOC; SPR | HUN; FEA | HUN; SPR | IST; FEA | IST; SPR | MNZ; FEA | MNZ; SPR | 20th | 6 |

=== American Open-Wheel ===
(key) (Races in bold indicate pole position)

==== Champ Car ====
| Year | Team | No. | Chassis | Engine | 1 | 2 | 3 | 4 | 5 | 6 | 7 | 8 | 9 | 10 | 11 | 12 | 13 | 14 | Rank | Points | Ref |
|---|---|---|---|---|---|---|---|---|---|---|---|---|---|---|---|---|---|---|---|---|---|
| 2007 | PKV Racing | 22 | Panoz DP01 | Cosworth XFE V8 t | LVS; 5 | LBH; 11 | HOU; 13 | POR; 7 | CLE; 13 | **MTT**; 12 | TOR; 15 | EDM | SJO; 8 | ROA; 7 | ZOL; 16 | ASN; 4 | SRF | MXC | **12th** | **140** | |

=== Complete Superleague Formula results ===
(Races in bold indicate pole position) (Races in italics indicate fastest lap)

| Year | Team | 1 | 2 | 3 | 4 | 5 | 6 | 7 | 8 | 9 | 10 | 11 | 12 | 13 | 14 | 15 | 16 | 17 | 18 | 19 | 20 | 21 | 22 | 23 | 24 | Pos | Pts |
|---|---|---|---|---|---|---|---|---|---|---|---|---|---|---|---|---|---|---|---|---|---|---|---|---|---|---|---|
| 2008 | F.C. Porto Alan Docking Racing | DON; 1; 7 | DON; 2; 9 | NÜR; 1; 8 | NÜR; 2; 5 | ZOL; 1; 6 | ZOL; 2; 15 | EST; 1; 16 | EST; 2 DNS | | | | | | | | | | | | | | | | | 7th | 277 |
| 2008 | F.C. Porto Hitech Junior Team | | | | | | | | | VLL; 1; 8 | VLL; 2; 1 | JER; 1; 2 | JER; 2; 12 | | | | | | | | | | | | | 7th | 277 |
| 2009 | F.C. Porto Hitech Junior Team | MAG; 1; 16 | MAG; 2; 7 | ZOL; 1; 12 | ZOL; 2; 7 | DON; 1; 8 | DON; 2; 1 | EST; 1 | EST; 2 | MNZ; 1; 7 | MNZ; 2; 13 | JAR; 1; 6 | JAR; 2; 5 | | | | | | | | | | | | | 5th | 302 |
| 2010 | Galatasaray S.K. Barazi-Epsilon | SIL; 1; 14 | SIL; 2; 14 | ASS; 1; 8 | ASS; 2; 8 | MAG; 1; 14 | MAG; 2; 9 | JAR; 1; 13 | JAR; 2; 14 | NÜR; 1; 9 | NÜR; 2; 3 | ZOL; 1; 14 | ZOL; 2; 3 | BRH; 1; 8 | BRH; 2; 17 | ADR; 1; 9 | ADR; 2; 13 | | | | | | | | | 13th | 358 |
| 2010 | Olympique Lyonnais Atech GP/Reid Motorsport | | | | | | | | | | | | | | | | | POR; 1; 11 | POR; 2; 2 | ORD; 1; 14 | ORD; 2; 17 | BEI; 1; 4 | BEI; 2; 11 | NAV; 1; 14 | NAV; 2; 13 | 18th | 235 |
| 2011 | France - Girondins de Bordeaux Azerti Motorsport | **ASS**; **1**; 14 | **ASS**; **2**; 4 | ZOL; 1; 14 | **ZOL**; **2**; 11 | | | | | | | | | | | | | | | | | | | | | 13th | 52 |

==== Super Final Results ====
- Super Final results in 2009 did not count for points towards the main championship.

| Year | Team | 1 | 2 | 3 | 4 | 5 | 6 | 7 | 8 | 9 | 10 | 11 | 12 |
|---|---|---|---|---|---|---|---|---|---|---|---|---|---|
| 2009 | F.C. Porto Hitech Junior Team | MAG; DNQ | ZOL; N/A | DON; 5 | EST | MOZ; N/A | JAR; 5 | | | | | | |
| 2010 | Galatasaray S.K. Barazi-Epsilon | SIL; DNQ | ASS; DNQ | MAG; DNQ | JAR; DNQ | NÜR; 5 | ZOL; 4 | BRH; DNQ | ADR; DNQ | | | | |
| 2010 | Olympique Lyonnais Atech GP/Reid Motorsport | | | | | | | | | POR; 6 | ORD; DNQ | BEI; C | NAV; DNQ |
| 2011 | France - Girondins de Bordeaux Azerti Motorsport | ASS; DNQ | ZOL; DNQ | | | | | | | | | | |

=== Complete 24 Hours of Le Mans results ===
| Year | Team | Co-Drivers | Car | Class | Laps | Pos. | Class Pos. |
|---|---|---|---|---|---|---|---|
| 2003 | (Netherlands) Racing for Holland | (Bolivia) Felipe Ortiz (Italy) Beppe Gabbiani | Dome S101-Judd | LMP900 | 316 | DNF | DNF |
| 2004 | (France) Gerard Welter | (France) Jean-Bernard Bouvet (France) Bastien Brière | WR LM2004-Peugeot | LMP2 | 137 | DNF | DNF |
| 2010 | (France) Gerard Welter | (France) Philippe Salini (France) Stéphane Salini | WR LMP2008-Zytek | LMP2 | 308 | 23rd | 8th |
| 2013 | (France) Signatech-Alpine | (France) Pierre Ragues (France) Nelson Panciatici | Alpine A450-Nissan | LMP2 | 317 | 14th | 8th |
| 2014 | (France) Thiriet by TDS Racing | (France) Pierre Thiriet (France) Ludovic Badey | Ligier JS P2-Nissan | LMP2 | 355 | 6th | **2nd** |
| 2015 | (France) Thiriet by TDS Racing | (France) Pierre Thiriet (France) Ludovic Badey | Oreca 05-Nissan | LMP2 | 204 | DNF | DNF |
| 2016 | (Philippines) Eurasia Motorsport | (Netherlands) Nick de Bruijn (China) Pu Jun Jin | Oreca 05-Nissan | LMP2 | 348 | 9th | 5th |
| 2017 | (China) Jackie Chan DC Racing | (United States) David Cheng (United Kingdom) Alex Brundle | Oreca 07-Gibson | LMP2 | 363 | **3rd** | **2nd** |
| 2018 | (France) Graff-SO24 | (France) Vincent Capillaire (Switzerland) Jonathan Hirschi | Oreca 07-Gibson | LMP2 | 366 | 6th | **2nd** |
| 2019 | (France) Graff | (France) Vincent Capillaire (Switzerland) Jonathan Hirschi | Oreca 07-Gibson | LMP2 | 362 | 14th | 9th |
| 2020 | (France) Duqueine Team | (Russia) Konstantin Tereshchenko (Switzerland) Jonathan Hirschi | Oreca 07-Gibson | LMP2 | 100 | DNF | DNF |
| 2021 | (France) Duqueine Team | (Austria) René Binder (Mexico) Memo Rojas | Oreca 07-Gibson | LMP2 | 357 | 14th | 9th |

=== Complete European Le Mans Series results ===
(key) (Races in bold indicate pole position; races in italics indicate fastest lap)

| Year | Entrant | Class | Car | Engine | 1 | 2 | 3 | 4 | 5 | 6 | Pos. | Points |
|---|---|---|---|---|---|---|---|---|---|---|---|---|
| 2008 | WR / Salini | LMP2 | WR LMP2008 | Zytek ZG348 3.4 L V8 | CAT | MNZ | SPA | NÜR | SIL; Ret | | NC | 0 |
| 2009 | WR / Salini | LMP2 | WR LMP2008 | Zytek ZG348 3.4 L V8 | CAT; 9 | SPA; 6 | ALG | NÜR; Ret | SIL; 9 | | 15th | 3 |
| 2010 | WR / Salini | LMP2 | WR LMP2008 | Zytek ZG348 3.4 L V8 | LEC; Ret | SPA | ALG | HUN | SIL | | NC | 0 |
| 2014 | Thiriet by TDS Racing | LMP2 | Morgan LMP2 | Nissan VK45DE 4.5 L V8 | SIL; 1 | IMO; 5 | | | | | 8th | 35 |
| 2014 | Thiriet by TDS Racing | LMP2 | Ligier JS P2 | Nissan VK45DE 4.5 L V8 | | | RBR; Ret | LEC; Ret | EST; Ret | | 8th | 35 |
| 2015 | Thiriet by TDS Racing | LMP2 | Oreca 05 | Nissan VK45DE 4.5 L V8 | SIL; 3 | IMO; 1 | RBR; 2 | LEC; 6 | EST | | 4th | 66 |
| 2016 | Eurasia Motorsport | LMP2 | Oreca 05 | Nissan VK45DE 4.5 L V8 | SIL; Ret | IMO; 5 | RBR; 2 | LEC; 4 | SPA; Ret | EST; 5 | 7th | 50 |
| 2018 | Graff | LMP2 | Oreca 07 | Gibson GK428 4.2 L V8 | LEC; 10 | MNZ; Ret | RBR; 8 | SIL; 4 | SPA; 8‡ | ALG; 8 | 11th | 23 |
| 2019 | Graff | LMP2 | Oreca 07 | Gibson GK428 4.2 L V8 | LEC; 5 | MNZ; 5 | CAT; 2 | SIL; 3 | SPA; 3 | ALG; 3 | 3rd | 83 |
| 2020 | Duqueine Engineering | LMP2 | Oreca 07 | Gibson GK428 4.2 L V8 | LEC; Ret | SPA; 4 | LEC; 9 | MNZ; 7 | ALG; 2 | | 7th | 38 |
| 2021 | Duqueine Team | LMP2 | Oreca 07 | Gibson GK428 4.2 L V8 | CAT; 6 | RBR; 9 | LEC; 4 | MNZ; 5 | SPA; 2 | ALG; Ret | 7th | 52 |

^{‡} Half points awarded as less than 75% of race distance was completed.

=== Complete FIA World Endurance Championship results ===
(key) (Races in bold indicate pole position; races in italics indicate fastest lap)

| Year | Entrant | Class | Car | Engine | 1 | 2 | 3 | 4 | 5 | 6 | 7 | 8 | 9 | Rank | Points |
|---|---|---|---|---|---|---|---|---|---|---|---|---|---|---|---|
| 2017 | Jackie Chan DC Racing | LMP2 | Oreca 07 | Gibson GK428 4.2 L V8 | SIL; 8 | SPA; 10 | LMS; 2 | NÜR; 5 | MEX; 6 | COA; 5 | FUJ; Ret | SHA; 8 | BHR; 8 | 11th | 77 |

Sporting positions
| Preceded by Ryo Fukuda | French Formula Three; Champion; 2002 | Succeeded by Ryan Briscoe (F3 Euroseries) |
| Preceded by Takuma Sato | Macau Grand Prix; Winner; 2002 | Succeeded by Nicolas Lapierre |
