= Olympique Lyonnais (Superleague Formula team) =

Olympique Lyonnais SF Racing Team
Founded	2009
Country	France
Driver(s)	Nelson Panciatici (2009); Sébastien Bourdais (2010); Franck Perera (2010); Celso Míguez (2010); Tristan Gommendy (2010)
First race	2009 Magny-Cours
Last race	2010 Navarra
Rounds	17
Ch'ships	0
Total points	395 (including Super Finals)
2010 position	18th (235 pts)
Races / Poles / Wins / Podiums / F. Laps; 33 / 0 / 1 / 2 / 2
NOTE - Data not including Super Finals

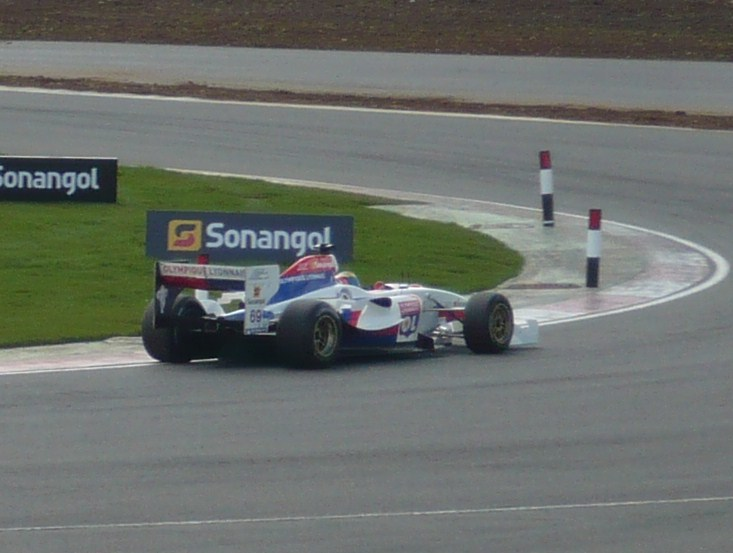
O. Lyonnais car with Sébastien Bourdais on track at Silverstone Circuit (2010)

Olympique Lyonnais Superleague Formula team is the racing team of Olympique Lyonnais, a football team that competes in France in the Ligue 1. The Olympique Lyonnais racing team competes in the Superleague Formula. It made its debut in the 2009 season and was operated by Barazi-Epsilon.

== 2009 season ==
Nelson Panciatici was confirmed as the driver of the Olympique Lyonnais entry.

== Record ==
(key)

=== 2009 ===
- Super Final results in 2009 did not count for points towards the main championship.

Operator(s)	Driver(s)	1			2			3			4			5			6			Points	Rank
Operator(s)	Driver(s)	MAG			ZOL			DON			EST			MOZ			JAR			Points	Rank
Barazi-Epsilon	(France) Nelson Panciatici	13	13	X	14	10	–	14	9	X	12	15	X	13	15	–	9	11	X	160	17th

=== 2010 ===
Operator(s)	Driver(s)	1			2			3			4			5			6	7			8			9			10			NC			11			Points	Rank
Operator(s)	Driver(s)	SIL			ASS			MAG			JAR			NÜR			ZOL	BRH			ADR			POR			ORD			BEI			NAV			Points	Rank
LRS Formula / Laurent Rédon Motorsport	(France) Sébastien Bourdais	15	1	4	17	DN	X	9	15	X	7	18	X	14	17	X																				235	18th
LRS Formula / Laurent Rédon Motorsport	(France) Franck Perera																	12	9	X																235	18th
Drivex	(Spain) Celso Míguez																				15	15	X													235	18th
Atech GP/Reid Motorsport	(France) Tristan Gommendy																							11	2	6	14	17	X	4	11	C	14	13	X	235	18th

==== 2010 Mid-season changes ====
- Olympique Lyonnais skipped the Zolder round after parting company with driver Sébastien Bourdais.
- Round 7 at Brands Hatch saw the return of club Olympique Lyonnais with new driver Franck Perera and Laurent Rédon's team rebranded as Laurent Rédon Motorsport over the previous incarnation as LRS Formula.
