= Barazi-Epsilon =

(France) Barazi-Epsilon
- Founded: 2000
- Team principal(s): Michel Lecomte; Juan Barazi
- Former series: French Formula Three Championship; British Formula 3 Championship; Superleague Formula; Le Mans Series

Barazi-Epsilon is a racing team owned by engineer Michel Lecomte and entrepreneur turned amateur racer Juan Barazi. The team's base is in Le Mans. The team was founded in 2000 as Epsilon Sport from the remains of the Graff Racing's Formula Three operations.

== History ==
They have competed in many series, including the Le Mans Series, French Formula Three Championship, British Formula 3 Championship and the Superleague Formula. Highlights for the team include winning the World Series by Nissan Light Class in 2001 and the LMP2 class in the 2006 Le Mans Series season.

In 2008 and 2009, the team competed in the Le Mans Series championship with drivers Fernando Rees, Michael Vergers and Juan Barazi. They have also been regulars at the 24 Hours of Le Mans race.

In 2009 they ran the Olympique Lyonnais car in Superleague Formula. In 2010 they are running the cars of GD Bordeaux and Galatasaray S.K.

=== As a car manufacturer ===
==== Barazi-Epsilon FR2.0-10 ====
The Barazi-Epsilon FR2.0-10 is the spec Formula Renault 2.0 car since 2010, it replaced the Tatuus FR2000 which was raced since 2000. The car is used in the Formula Renault 2.0 Eurocup and the Formula Renault 2.0 NEC. A Renault Sport tuned Renault F4R powers the car.

==== Beta Epsilon Formula Premium ====
The Formula Premium is a junior formula racecar designed for racing schools and junior racing classes. The car was designed in 2012 for the 2013 Formula Premium series. The car features a 1,6L Renault engine, also seen in the Formula Renault 1.6.
