= 2004 Formula Renault V6 Eurocup =

Seasons
- ← 2003 2005 →

The 2004 Formula Renault V6 Eurocup season began on the weekend of 27 March at Monza. 2004 was the last season of this championship because Renault created World Series by Renault in 2005, merging Formula Renault V6 Eurocup and World Series by Nissan. The titles went to Swiss driver Giorgio Mondini and Italian team EuroInternational.

== Entry list ==
Team	No.	Driver	Rounds
(France) DAMS (France) Telmex-DAMS	1	(Switzerland) Neel Jani	All
(France) DAMS (France) Telmex-DAMS	2	(France) Bruce Lorgère-Roux	1-8
(France) DAMS (France) Telmex-DAMS	27	(Mexico) Memo Rojas	All
(France) DAMS (France) Telmex-DAMS	37	(Argentina) José María López	9-10
(Switzerland) Jenzer Motorsport	3	(United States) Dominic Cicero	1-5
(Switzerland) Jenzer Motorsport	3	(Austria) Andreas Feichtner	7-9
(Switzerland) Jenzer Motorsport	3	(Switzerland) Marc Benz	10
(Switzerland) Jenzer Motorsport	4	(United Kingdom) Ryan Sharp	All
(United Kingdom) David Price Racing	5	(Japan) Hayanari Shimoda	All
(United Kingdom) David Price Racing	6	(United Kingdom) Robert Bell	All
(Italy) EuroInternational	7	(Switzerland) Giorgio Mondini	All
(Italy) EuroInternational	50	(Italy) Stefano Proetto	All
(Italy) Avelon Formula	9	(Italy) Ivan Bellarosa	1-8
(Italy) Victory Engineering	10	(France) Damien Pasini	All
(Italy) Victory Engineering	11	(United Kingdom) Robbie Kerr	1-5
(Italy) Victory Engineering	11	(San Marino) Christian Montanari	6-10
(Austria) Interwetten.com	12	(Germany) Sven Barth	2-10
(Austria) Interwetten.com	14	(Netherlands) Jaap van Lagen	All
(Italy) RD Motorsport	7	(Germany) Ralf Dekarski	1-7
(Italy) RD Motorsport	8	(New Zealand) Matt Halliday	1-7
(Italy) AFC Motorsport (Italy) AFC Drive	15	(Italy) Andrea Belicchi	All
(Italy) AFC Motorsport (Italy) AFC Drive	16	(Italy) Matteo Meneghello	1-8
(Italy) AFC Motorsport (Italy) AFC Drive	22	(Italy) Andrea Scafuro	2-4
(Italy) Cram Competition	18	(Mexico) David Martínez	1-6, 8-9
(Italy) Cram Competition	18	(Venezuela) Pastor Maldonado	7
(Italy) Cram Competition	18	(Argentina) Esteban Guerrieri	10
(Italy) Cram Competition	19	(Portugal) César Campaniço	All
(Sweden) SRTS (United Kingdom) SRTS UK	20	(Sweden) Alx Danielsson	1-6, 8-10
(Sweden) SRTS (United Kingdom) SRTS UK	21	(Sweden) Edward Sandström	1-6, 8-10
(Sweden) SRTS (United Kingdom) SRTS UK	26	(South Korea) Seung Yin Lee	All

== Race calendar and results ==
Round		Location	Circuit	Date	Pole position	Fastest lap	Winning driver	Winning team
1	R1	Monza, Italy	Autodromo Nazionale Monza	27 March	(United Kingdom) Robbie Kerr	(Italy) Stefano Proetto	(Italy) Andrea Belicchi	(Italy) AFC Motorsport
1	R2	Monza, Italy	Autodromo Nazionale Monza	28 March	(United Kingdom) Robert Bell	(United Kingdom) Robert Bell	(United Kingdom) Ryan Sharp	(Switzerland) Jenzer Motorsport
2	R1	Valencia, Spain	Circuit de Valencia	17 April	(United Kingdom) Ryan Sharp	(Switzerland) Giorgio Mondini	(France) Damien Pasini	(Italy) Victory Engineering
2	R2	Valencia, Spain	Circuit de Valencia	18 April	(Italy) Andrea Belicchi	(United Kingdom) Robbie Kerr	(United Kingdom) Robbie Kerr	(Italy) Victory Engineering
3	R1	Magny-Cours, France	Circuit de Nevers Magny-Cours	1 May	(Switzerland) Giorgio Mondini	(United Kingdom) Ryan Sharp	(Switzerland) Giorgio Mondini	(Italy) EuroInternational
3	R2	Magny-Cours, France	Circuit de Nevers Magny-Cours	2 May	(Switzerland) Giorgio Mondini	(Switzerland) Giorgio Mondini	(Switzerland) Giorgio Mondini	(Italy) EuroInternational
4	R	Monte Carlo, Monaco	Circuit de Monaco	23 May	(Switzerland) Neel Jani	(Switzerland) Neel Jani	(Germany) Sven Barth	(Austria) Interwetten.com
5	R1	Brno, Czech Republic	Masaryk Circuit	29 May	(Switzerland) Neel Jani	(Switzerland) Neel Jani	(Switzerland) Neel Jani	(France) DAMS
5	R2	Brno, Czech Republic	Masaryk Circuit	30 May	(Switzerland) Neel Jani	(Switzerland) Neel Jani	(Switzerland) Neel Jani	(France) DAMS
6	R1	Leicestershire, United Kingdom	Donington Park	26 June	(Switzerland) Neel Jani	(Japan) Hayanari Shimoda	(Italy) Andrea Belicchi	(Italy) AFC Motorsport
6	R2	Leicestershire, United Kingdom	Donington Park	27 June	(United Kingdom) Robert Bell	(Germany) Sven Barth	(Italy) Andrea Belicchi	(Italy) AFC Motorsport
7	R1	Spa, Belgium	Circuit de Spa-Francorchamps	30 July	(Switzerland) Neel Jani	(Switzerland) Neel Jani	(Switzerland) Neel Jani	(France) DAMS
7	R2	Spa, Belgium	Circuit de Spa-Francorchamps	31 July	(Switzerland) Neel Jani	(United Kingdom) Ryan Sharp	(United Kingdom) Ryan Sharp	(Switzerland) Jenzer Motorsport
8	R1	Imola, Italy	Autodromo Enzo e Dino Ferrari	4 September	(Switzerland) Giorgio Mondini	(San Marino) Christian Montanari	(Switzerland) Giorgio Mondini	(Italy) EuroInternational
8	R2	Imola, Italy	Autodromo Enzo e Dino Ferrari	5 September	(Switzerland) Neel Jani	(Germany) Sven Barth	(San Marino) Christian Montanari	(Italy) Victory Engineering
9	R1	Oschersleben, Germany	Motorsport Arena Oschersleben	18 September	(Argentina) José María López	(Japan) Hayanari Shimoda	(Netherlands) Jaap van Lagen	(Austria) Interwetten.com
9	R2	Oschersleben, Germany	Motorsport Arena Oschersleben	19 September	(Switzerland) Neel Jani	(Portugal) César Campaniço	(Switzerland) Neel Jani	(France) DAMS
10	R1	Dubai, United Arab Emirates	Dubai Autodrome	7 October	(Netherlands) Jaap van Lagen	(San Marino) Christian Montanari	(Sweden) Alx Danielsson	(Sweden) SRTS
10	R2	Dubai, United Arab Emirates	Dubai Autodrome	8 October	(San Marino) Christian Montanari	(San Marino) Christian Montanari	(San Marino) Christian Montanari	(Italy) Victory Engineering

== Championship standings ==
Points are awarded in both races as follows: 30, 24, 20, 14, 10, 8, 6, 4, 2 and 2 bonus points for fastest lap. Due to climatic conditions, the French sprint race had to be stopped. Half points were awarded.

=== Drivers ===
Pos	Driver	ITA1 (Italy)		VAL (Spain)		FRA (France)		MON (Monaco)	CZE (Czech Republic)		UK (United Kingdom)		BEL (Belgium)		ITA2 (Italy)		GER (Germany)		UAE (United Arab Emirates)		Points
Pos	Driver	fea	spr	fea	spr	fea	spr	fea	fea	spr	fea	spr	fea	spr	fea	spr	fea	spr	fea	spr	Points
1	(Switzerland) Giorgio Mondini	2	Ret	13	4	1	1	4	Ret	3	6	9	2	4	1	4	2	Ret	3	5	293
2	(United Kingdom) Ryan Sharp	3	1	2	2	3	8	Ret	7	9	3	11	5	1	6	3	4	2	5	10	271
3	(Italy) Andrea Belicchi	1	5	Ret	5	4	9	3	Ret	8	1	1	3	Ret	8	5	7	5	7	4	250
4	(Switzerland) Neel Jani	Ret	7	Ret	10	2	10	2	1	1	10	5	1	2	Ret	Ret	8	1	2	16	239
5	(United Kingdom) Robert Bell	7	2	Ret	3	12	7	6	Ret	2	2	14	10	9	7	7	6	14	9	17	156
6	(Portugal) César Campaniço	Ret	4	3	12	7	13	11	6	4	Ret	6	16	14	5	2	5	3	10	Ret	154
7	(Netherlands) Jaap van Lagen	6	10	5	9	6	6	5	Ret	Ret	5	10	Ret	Ret	17	14	1	4	17	2	145
8	(France) Damien Pasini	11	13	1	6	8	12	Ret	9	13	13	4	8	Ret	3	9	3	11	6	14	128
9	(Germany) Sven Barth			9	7	10	4	1	4	5	Ret	16	11	11	4	Ret	9	13	13	3	126
10	(San Marino) Christian Montanari										4	2	4	7	2	1	Ret	12	16	1	122
11	(Sweden) Alx Danielsson	Ret	3	Ret	19	Ret	DNS	Ret	5	12	Ret	Ret			10	6	Ret	7	1	8	88
12	(Italy) Stefano Proetto	4*	Ret	Ret	Ret	11	3	Ret	2	7	Ret	7	7	12	11	Ret	Ret	9	Ret	15	78
13	(Japan) Hayanari Shimoda	Ret	Ret	11	8	16	11	Ret	8	11	8	12	6	3	Ret	Ret	10	6	15	6	73
14	(France) Bruce Lorgère-Roux	5	Ret	6	18	14	2	Ret	3	15	9	13	9	8	15	12					72
15	(United Kingdom) Robbie Kerr	8	Ret	7	1	9	5	Ret	10	6											70
16	(Mexico) Memo Rojas	Ret	12	12	16	13	19	Ret	12	18	12	3	14	6	13	11	11	8	4	7	62
17	(Mexico) David Martínez	9	6	Ret	11	5	16	Ret	14	10	7	8			9	8	12	Ret			60
18	(Italy) Andrea Scafuro			4	Ret	Ret	14	Ret													16
19	(Italy) Ivan Bellarosa	13	9	10	Ret	Ret	18	7	15	Ret	11	Ret	17	13	18	Ret					14
20	(Sweden) Edward Sandström	Ret	8	14	13	Ret	DNS	10	13	16	Ret	17			16	13	13	15	8	12	14
21	(Venezuela) Pastor Maldonado												13	5							12
22	(Italy) Matteo Meneghello	12	Ret	Ret	17	15	17	8	11	14	Ret	15	12	Ret	12	Ret					6
23	(South Korea) Seung Yin Lee			8	14	Ret	20														6
24	(United States) Dominic Cicero	10	11	Ret	15	Ret	15	9	Ret	17											6
25	(Austria) Andreas Feichtner												15	10	14	10	Ret	10			6
26	(Argentina) Esteban Guerrieri																		14	9	4
27	(Argentina) José María López																Ret	Ret	12	11	2
28	(Switzerland) Marc Benz																		11	12	0
Pos	Driver	ITA1 (Italy)		VAL (Spain)		FRA (France)		MON (Monaco)	CZE (Czech Republic)		UK (United Kingdom)		BEL (Belgium)		ITA2 (Italy)		GER (Germany)		UAE (United Arab Emirates)		Points

Colour	Result
Gold	Winner
Silver	Second place
Bronze	Third place
Green	Points classification
Blue	Non-points classification
Blue	Non-classified finish (NC)
Purple	Retired, not classified (Ret)
Red	Did not qualify (DNQ)
Red	Did not pre-qualify (DNPQ)
Black	Disqualified (DSQ)
White	Did not start (DNS)
White	Withdrew (WD)
White	Race cancelled (C)
Blank	Did not practice (DNP)
Blank	Did not arrive (DNA)
Blank	Excluded (EX)

=== Teams ===
Pos	Team	Drivers	ITA1 (Italy)		VAL (Spain)		FRA (France)		MON (Monaco)	CZE (Czech Republic)		UK (United Kingdom)		BEL (Belgium)		ITA2 (Italy)		GER (Germany)		UAE (United Arab Emirates)		Points
Pos	Team	Drivers	fea	spr	fea	spr	fea	spr	fea	fea	spr	fea	spr	fea	spr	fea	spr	fea	spr	fea	spr	Points
1	(Italy) EuroInternational	Giorgio Mondini	2	Ret	13	4	1	1	4	Ret	3	6	9	2	4	1	4	2	Ret	3	5	371
1	(Italy) EuroInternational	Stefano Proetto	4*	Ret	Ret	Ret	11	3	Ret	2	7	Ret	7	7	12	11	Ret	Ret	9	Ret	15	371
2	(Italy) Victory Engineering	Damien Pasini	11	13	1	6	8	12	Ret	9	13	13	4	8	Ret	3	9	3	11	6	14	320
2	(Italy) Victory Engineering	Robbie Kerr	8	Ret	7	1	9	5	Ret	10	6											320
2	(Italy) Victory Engineering	Christian Montanari										4	2	4	7	2	1	Ret	12	16	1	320
3	(France) DAMS	Neel Jani	Ret	7	Ret	10	2	10	2	1	1	10	5	1	2	Ret	Ret	8	1	2	16	315
3	(France) DAMS	Bruce Lorgère-Roux	5	Ret	6	18	14	2	Ret	3	15	9	13	9	8	15	12					315
3	(France) DAMS	José María López																Ret	Ret	12	11	315
4	(Switzerland) Jenzer Motorsport	Ryan Sharp	3	1	2	2	3	8	Ret	7	9	3	11	5	1	6	3	4	2	5	10	283
4	(Switzerland) Jenzer Motorsport	Dominic Cicero	10	11	Ret	15	Ret	15	9	Ret	17											283
4	(Switzerland) Jenzer Motorsport	Andreas Feichtner												15	10	14	10	Ret	10			283
4	(Switzerland) Jenzer Motorsport	Marc Benz																		11	12	283
5	(Austria) Interwetten.com	Jaap van Lagen	6	10	5	9	6	6	5	Ret	Ret	5	10	Ret	Ret	17	14	1	4	17	2	271
5	(Austria) Interwetten.com	Sven Barth			9	7	10	4	1	4	5	Ret	16	11	11	4	Ret	9	13	13	3	271
6	(Italy) AFC Motorsport	Andrea Belicchi	1	5	Ret	5	4	9	3	Ret	8	1	1	3	Ret	8	5	7	5	7	4	256
6	(Italy) AFC Motorsport	Matteo Meneghello	12	Ret	Ret	17	15	17	8	11	14	Ret	15	12	Ret	12	Ret					256
7	(United Kingdom) David Price Racing	Robert Bell	7	2	Ret	3	12	7	6	Ret	2	2	14	10	9	7	7	6	14	9	17	232
7	(United Kingdom) David Price Racing	Hayanari Shimoda	Ret	Ret	11	8	16	11	Ret	8	11	8	12	6	3	Ret	Ret	10	6	15	6	232
8	(Italy) Cram Competition	César Campaniço	Ret	4	3	12	7	13	11	6	4	Ret	6	16	14	5	2	5	3	10	Ret	232
8	(Italy) Cram Competition	David Martínez	9	6	Ret	11	5	16	Ret	14	10	7	8			9	8	12	Ret			232
8	(Italy) Cram Competition	Pastor Maldonado												13	5							232
9	(Sweden) SRTS	Alx Danielsson	Ret	3	Ret	19	Ret	DNS	Ret	5	12	Ret	Ret			10	6	Ret	7	1	8	102
9	(Sweden) SRTS	Edward Sandström	Ret	8	14	13	Ret	DNS	10	13	16	Ret	17			16	13	13	15	8	12	102
10	(France) Telmex-DAMS	Memo Rojas	Ret	12	12	16	13	19	Ret	12	18	12	3	14	6	13	11	11	8	4	7	62
11	(Italy) AFC Drive	Andrea Scafuro			4	Ret	Ret	14	Ret													16
12	(Italy) Avelon Formula	Ivan Bellarosa	13	9	10	Ret	Ret	18	7	15	Ret	11	Ret	17	13	18	Ret					14
13	(United Kingdom) SRTS UK	Seung Yin Lee			8	14	Ret	20														6
Pos	Team	Drivers	ITA1 (Italy)		VAL (Spain)		FRA (France)		MON (Monaco)	CZE (Czech Republic)		UK (United Kingdom)		BEL (Belgium)		ITA2 (Italy)		GER (Germany)		UAE (United Arab Emirates)		Points

Colour	Result
Gold	Winner
Silver	Second place
Bronze	Third place
Green	Points classification
Blue	Non-points classification
Blue	Non-classified finish (NC)
Purple	Retired, not classified (Ret)
Red	Did not qualify (DNQ)
Red	Did not pre-qualify (DNPQ)
Black	Disqualified (DSQ)
White	Did not start (DNS)
White	Withdrew (WD)
White	Race cancelled (C)
Blank	Did not practice (DNP)
Blank	Did not arrive (DNA)
Blank	Excluded (EX)
