= Éric Salignon =

French racing driver (born 1982)

- Nationality: (France) French
- Born: 22 July 1982 (age 44) Carpentras (France)

Previous series
- 2005–06 2004 2003 2000–02 2000–02: Formula Renault 3.5 Series; Formula 3 Euro Series; British F3; FR2000 Eurocup; French FRenault 2000

Championship titles
- 2002 2001: FR2000 Eurocup; French FRenault 2000

Éric Salignon (born 22 July 1982 in Carpentras) is a French former racing driver.

== Career ==
=== Formula Renault ===
A former two-time winner of the Monaco Kart Cup, Salignon moved into Formula Renault in 2000, competing in both the European and French championships. Solid campaigns in both championships enabled Salignon to finished 16th in his national championship, and one place lower in the pan-European series. He continued in both series in 2001, driving for Graff Racing. He finished fifth in the Eurocup, in just seven races. With his focus on the French series, Salignon won that particular championship by 37 points. This performance earned him a spot in the inaugural Renault Driver Development programme in 2002. Salignon's 2002 season was impressive, as he won the Eurocup by four points from Neel Jani, and lost the French title by just two points to Alexandre Prémat. In fourteen races, he won seven and finished on the podium a further three times.

=== Formula Three ===
Continuing on the RDD in 2003, Salignon moved to the British Formula 3 Championship driving for David Hayle's Hitech Racing team. Teaming up with fellow RDD driver Danny Watts, Salignon claimed a solitary pole position at Thruxton, and led that race until five laps from the end, colliding with the eventual champion Alan van der Merwe. He redeemed himself with his best finish of the season at the following round at Spa with second place. He eventually finished twelfth in the championship, but was consequently dropped by Renault for the RDD.

For 2004, Salignon moved into the Formula Three Euroseries driving for the ASM team, joining his former Formula Renault rival Prémat and British driver Jamie Green, who had competed against Salignon in British F3. Salignon won races at Estoril, Adria and Zandvoort before leaving the team, whilst lying in third place in the championship. He ended up finishing sixth in the standings, and was also the runner-up to Prémat at the prestigious Masters of Formula 3, also at Zandvoort.

=== World Series by Renault ===
After leaving ASM, Salignon signed up to compete in the World Series by Renault for its debut season in 2005, with the series having previously been named the World Series by Nissan. He competed for the Cram Competition team, and ended up tenth overall tying on points with Jaap van Lagen. He did miss the Estoril rounds of the championship though, with British driver Ben Hanley replacing him. Hanley ended up taking Salignon's seat at Cram for the 2006, with Salignon moving to Interwetten. He started the season off with a double win at Zolder, which was only ratified a month after the conclusion of the season. Salignon had lost the first of his two wins, due to the race results being completely annulled, after protests from a rival team. He had since left the team by the time he got his second win back, having been replaced by Franck Perera for the final round, in order for his team to successfully clinch the teams championship. Since being replaced, he has not taken part in any major international championship.

== Racing record ==
=== Career summary ===
Season	Series	Team	Races	Wins	Poles	F/Laps	Podiums	Points	Position
2000	Formula Renault 2000 Eurocup	?	?	0	0	1	?	20	17th
2000	French Formula Renault 2000	Barroso Racing Team	8	0	0	0	0	10	16th
2001	Formula Renault 2000 Eurocup	Graff Racing	7	1	1	1	3	102	5th
2001	French Formula Renault 2000	Graff Racing	11	4	5	5	8	162	**1st**
2002	Formula Renault 2000 Eurocup	Graff Racing	9	4	2	2	5	182	**1st**
2002	French Formula Renault 2000	Graff Racing	5	3	3	2	5	111	**2nd**
2003	British Formula 3 International Series	Hitech Racing	22	0	1	1	1	43	12th
2003	Masters of Formula 3	Hitech Racing	1	0	0	0	0	N/A	DNF
2004	Formula 3 Euro Series	ASM Formule 3	16	3	3	3	5	64	6th
2004	Masters of Formula 3	ASM Formule 3	1	0	0	1	1	N/A	**2nd**
2004	Macau Grand Prix	ASM Formule 3	1	0	0	0	0	N/A	DNF
2004	Bahrain Superprix	ASM Formule 3	1	0	0	0	0	N/A	14th
2005	Formula Renault 3.5 Series	Cram Competition	15	0	1	2	1	49	10th
2006	Formula Renault 3.5 Series	Interwetten.com	15	2	0	1	2	48	9th

=== Complete Formula 3 Euro Series results ===
(key) (Races in bold indicate pole position; races in italics indicate fastest lap)

Year	Entrant	Chassis	Engine	1	2	3	4	5	6	7	8	9	10	11	12	13	14	15	16	17	18	19	20	DC	Points
2004	ASM Formule 3	Dallara F303/014	HWA-Mercedes	HOC; 1; 5	HOC; 2; 5	EST; 1 Ret	EST; 2; 1	ADR; 1; 22	ADR; 1; 1	**PAU**; **1** Ret	PAU; 2; 4	NOR; 1; 7	NOR; 1; 9	MAG; 1; 2	MAG; 2 Ret	NÜR; 1; 11	NÜR; 2 Ret	**ZAN**; **1**; 1	**ZAN**; **2**; 2	BRN; 1	BRN; 2	HOC; 1	HOC; 2	6th	64

=== Complete Formula Renault 3.5 Series results ===
(key) (Races in bold indicate pole position) (Races in italics indicate fastest lap)

Year	Entrant	1	2	3	4	5	6	7	8	9	10	11	12	13	14	15	16	17	DC	Points
2005	Cram Competition	ZOL; 1; 15	ZOL; 2 Ret	MON; 1; 14	VAL; 1; 23†	VAL; 2; 3	LMS; 1; 5	LMS; 2; 4	BIL; 1; 4	BIL; 2; 5	OSC; 1 Ret	OSC; 2; 8	DON; 1 Ret	**DON**; **2** Ret	EST; 1	EST; 2	MNZ; 1; 6	MNZ; 2 Ret	10th	49
2006	Interwetten.com	ZOL; 1; 1	ZOL; 2; 1	MON; 1; 20	IST; 1; 17	IST; 2; 23†	MIS; 1; 22	MIS; 2; 8	SPA; 1; 9	SPA; 2; 5	NÜR; 1 NC	NÜR; 2; 7	DON; 1; 14	DON; 2; 11	LMS; 1; 18	LMS; 2; 9	CAT; 1	CAT; 2	9th	48

^{†} Driver did not finish the race, but was classified as he completed more than 90% of the race distance.

Sporting positions
Preceded by Renaud Derlot	French Formula Renault 2000; Champion; 2001	Succeeded by Alexandre Prémat
Preceded by Augusto Farfus	Formula Renault 2000 Eurocup; Champion; 2002	Succeeded by Esteban Guerrieri
