= Interwetten Racing =

(Austria) Interwetten Racing
- Founded: 2001
- Team principal(s): Walter Raus
- Current series: World Series by Renault; Intercontinental Rally Challenge
- Former series: Formula VW; Formula Renault V6 Eurocup
- Teams' Championships: 2002 Formula Volkswagen Germany; 2006 World Series by Renault
- Drivers' Championships: 2002 Formula Volkswagen Germany (Barth)

Interwetten.com Racing is a racing team from Austria. It was founded in 2001 by Walter Raus.

== Career ==
The team started its career in Formula Volkswagen, and in its second year of operations won the championship with the German driver Sven Barth.

In 2004 they moved up to Formula Renault V6 Eurocup with drivers Sven Barth and Jaap van Lagen, with sponsorship from the Austrian bookmaking agency Interwetten, with Barth winning the Monaco race and Van Lagen taking a win Oschersleben.

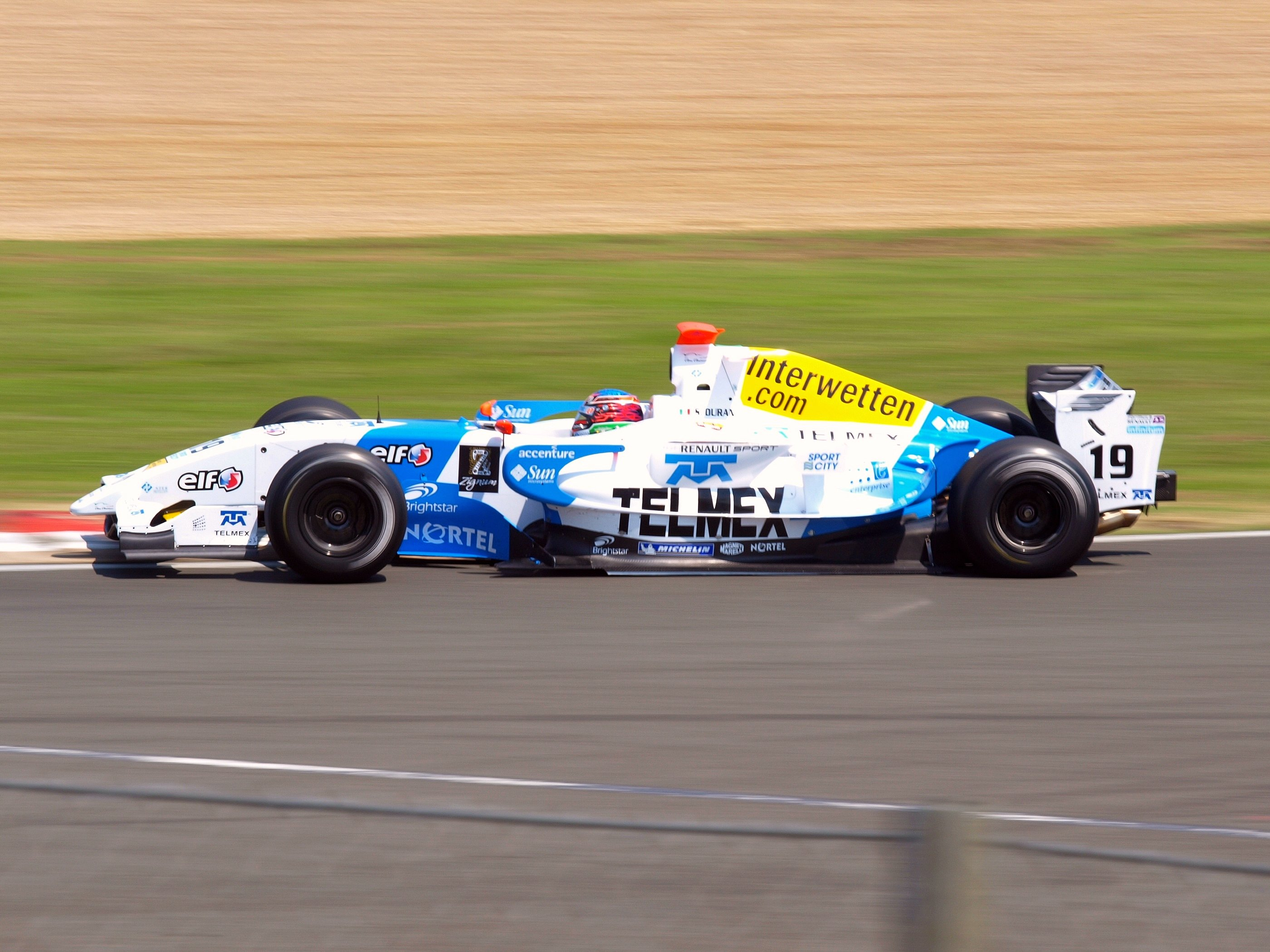
Salvador Durán driving for Interwetten at the Silverstone round of the 2008 World Series by Renault season.

The following year, Renault founded the World Series by Renault, merging World Series by Nissan and Formula Renault V6 Eurocup and Interwetten remained. Fernando Rees drove for the team and scored a series of impressive Qualifying results.

But they would have to wait until 2006, for their first success with Andy Soucek and Eric Salignon taking several race victories, giving Interwetten the Teams Championship.

New driver Salvador Durán brought Telmex in as sponsor for 2007, winning one race while teammate Daniil Move failed to score a point. In 2008 the Austrian team ran Durán alongside compatriot Pablo Sánchez López.

In 2010, the team has announced it wants to expand to include the Formula Renault 2.0 Eurocup series.

Interwetten.com Racing, managed by Motorsport Consulting GmbH, was not selected by Renault-Sport for the 2010 Formula Renault 3.5 Series. Instead, a new team, FHV Interwetten.com, managed by FHV GmbH, was selected.

== Results ==
=== World Series by Renault ===
World Series by Renault results
Year	Car	Drivers	Races	Wins	Poles	Fast laps	Points	D.C.	T.C.
2005	Dallara T05-Renault	(Germany) Daniel la Rosa	10	0	0	0	18	18th	12th
2005	Dallara T05-Renault	(Brazil) Fernando Rees	12	0	0	0	0	N/A	12th
2005	Dallara T05-Renault	(Germany) Sven Barth	1	0	0	0	0	N/A	12th
2005	Dallara T05-Renault	(Brazil) Carlos Iaconelli	2	0	0	0	0	N/A	12th
2005	Dallara T05-Renault	(Italy) Stefano Proetto	0	0	0	0	0	N/A	12th
2006	Dallara T05-Renault	(France) Eric Salignon	15	2	0	1	48	9th	1st
2006	Dallara T05-Renault	(France) Franck Perera	2	0	0	0	13	22nd	1st
2006	Dallara T05-Renault	(Spain) Andy Soucek	17	1	1	0	99	4th	1st
2007	Dallara T05-Renault	(Mexico) Salvador Durán	17	1	1	0	64	8th	10th
2007	Dallara T05-Renault	(Russia) Daniil Move	16	0	0	0	0	N/A	10th
2008	Dallara T08-Renault	(Mexico) Salvador Durán							
2008	Dallara T08-Renault	(Mexico) Pablo Sánchez López							

=== Formula Renault V6 Eurocup ===
Formula Renault V6 Eurocup results
Year	Car	Drivers	Races	Wins	Poles	Fast laps	Points	D.C.	T.C.
2004	Tatuus-Renault	(Netherlands) Jaap van Lagen	19	1			145	7th	5th
2004	Tatuus-Renault	(Germany) Sven Barth	17	1	0	2	126	9th	5th

* D.C. = Drivers' Championship position, T.C. = Teams' Championship position.

== Timeline ==
Type	2000s
Type	01	02	03	04	05	06	07	08
Formulas	Formula VW
Formulas				Formula Renault V6
Formulas					World Series by Renault

Achievements
Preceded by Epsilon Euskadi	Formula Renault 3.5 Series Teams' Champion; 2006	Succeeded by Tech 1 Racing
