= Victory Engineering =

(Italy) Victory Engineering
- Founded: 2002
- Folded: 2007
- Team principal(s): Gabriele De Bono
- Former series: Euro Formula 3000; Eurocup Formula Renault V6; World Series by Renault; Formula BMW UK

Victory Engineering was a racing team based on Rome, Italy, involved in many areas of motorsport. The team was founded in 2002 by Gabriele De Bono, as part of Carlin Motorsport. In the end of 2007 the team disbanded.

== History ==
Victory Engineering started competing in Italian Formula 3000/Euro Formula 3000 in 2002. Victory Engineering were involved in the World Series by Renault from 2005 to 2007. Previously the team had raced in the Eurocup Formula Renault V6. In 2007 the team also entered Formula BMW UK.

== Results ==
=== Euro Formula 3000 ===
Euro Formula 3000 results
Year	Car	Drivers	Races	Wins	Poles	F.L.	Points	D.C.	T.C.
2002	Lola B99/50–Zytek	(Italy) Marco Cioci	9	0	0	0	0	NC	7th
2002	Lola B99/50–Zytek	(France) Julien Vidot	6	0	0	0	6	11th	7th
2002	Lola B99/50–Zytek	(Italy) Matteo Pellegrino	2	0	0	0	0	NC	7th

=== Formula Renault V6 Eurocup ===
Formula Renault V6 Eurocup results
Year	Car	Drivers	Races	Wins	Poles	F.L.	Points	D.C.	T.C.
2003	Tatuus FRV6–Renault V4Y RS	(France) Damien Pasini	16	0	0	0	59	13th	4th^{1}
2003	Tatuus FRV6–Renault V4Y RS	(Brazil) Jaime Melo, Jr.	16	4	1	3	226	5th	4th^{1}
2003	Tatuus FRV6–Renault V4Y RS	(Switzerland) Giorgio Mondini	2	0	0	0	14	7th^{2}	4th^{1}
2004	Tatuus FRV6–Renault V4Y RS	(France) Damien Pasini	19	1	0	0	128	8th	2nd
2004	Tatuus FRV6–Renault V4Y RS	(United Kingdom) Robbie Kerr	9	1	1	0	70	15th	2nd
2004	Tatuus FRV6–Renault V4Y RS	(San Marino) Christian Montanari	10	2	1	0	122	10th	2nd

=== World Series by Renault ===
Formula Renault 3.5 results
Year	Car	Drivers	Races	Wins	Poles	F.L.	Points	D.C.	T.C.
2005	Dallara T05–Renault	(Italy) Enrico Toccacelo	9	1	1	1	36	12th	8th
2005	Dallara T05–Renault	(Brazil) Danilo Dirani	2	0	0	0	0	NC	8th
2005	Dallara T05–Renault	(Italy) Davide Rigon	4	0	0	0	4	26th	8th
2005	Dallara T05–Renault	(Czech Republic) Tomáš Kostka	11	0	0	0	6	23rd	8th
2005	Dallara T05–Renault	(United States) Richard Antinucci	2	0	0	0	0	NC	8th
2006	Dallara T05–Renault	(Portugal) Álvaro Parente	15	3	0	0	94	5th	6th
2006	Dallara T05–Renault	(Japan) Hayanari Shimoda	15	0	0	0	23	12th	6th
2006	Dallara T05–Renault	(United Kingdom) Oliver Jarvis	2	0	0	0	0	NC	6th
2007	Dallara T05–Renault	(Netherlands) Giedo van der Garde	17	0	0	1	67	6th	9th
2007	Dallara T05–Renault	(United States) Charlie Kimball	13	0	0	0	7	24th	9th
2007	Dallara T05–Renault	(Brazil) Alberto Valerio	2	0	0	0	0	NC	9th

=== Formula BMW UK ===
Formula BMW UK results
Year	Car	Drivers	Races	Wins	Poles	F.L.	Points	D.C.	T.C.
2007	Mygale FB02–BMW	(France) Anthony Comas	18	0	0	0	202	15th	

Notes:

- 1. – Entered the championship as Victory by Cram.
- 2. – Mondini also scored 95 points in 16 races for EuroInternational.

== Timeline ==
	2000s
	02	03	04	05	06	07
Formulas	Euro F3000
Formulas		Eurocup Formula Renault V6
Formulas				World Series by Renault
Formulas						Formula BMW UK
