= 2007 Formula Renault 3.5 Series =

Seasons
- ← 2006 2008 →

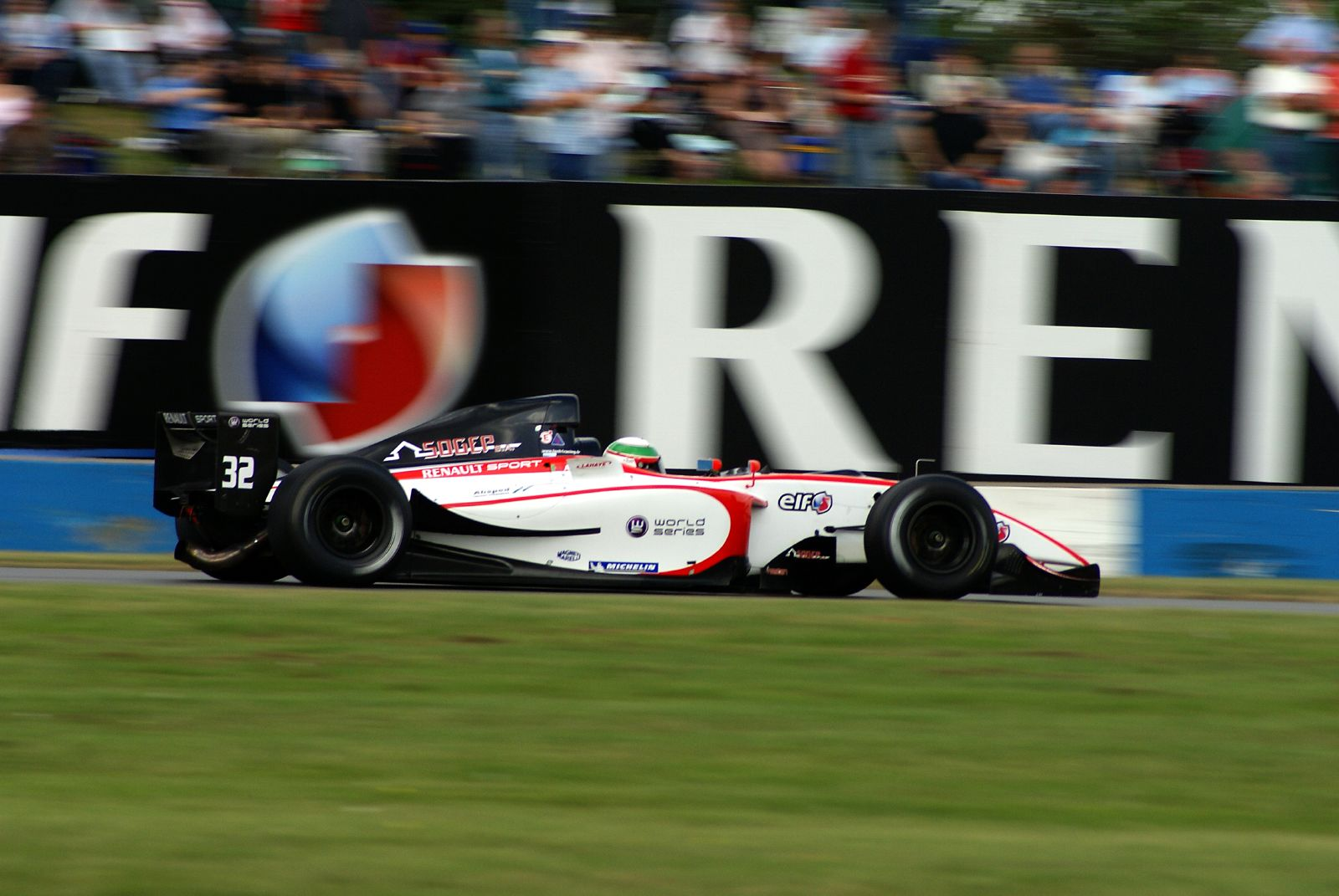
The Drivers' Championship was won by Portuguese driver Álvaro Parente.

The 2007 Formula Renault 3.5 Series was the third Formula Renault 3.5 Series season. It began on 14 April 2007 in Monza, Italy and finished in Barcelona, Spain on 28 October 2007 after 17 races.

== Regulation Changes ==
=== Technical ===
New to the Formula Renault 3.5 Series for the 2007 season was a 'push to pass' system, similar to the one that was used in the Champ Car World Series. In a bid to promote more overtaking, drivers were now able to boost their power for up to 60 seconds per race.

The cars also featured modifications to the gearbox, shock absorbers, rear anti-roll bar and steering system.

=== Sporting ===
A number of new rules were introduced for 2007 in order to improve the racing and to create more excitement:

- The length of the first race at each event was extended, meaning that both races would now last for approximately 45 minutes (except Monaco, where there was only one race).
- The grid for Race One was still decided by a 20-minute qualifying session, but the grid for Race Two was now determined by the finishing order of the first race, with the top 10 positions reversed.
- Points were also awarded to the top 3 drivers in each qualifying group for Race One. The 30 drivers were split into two groups of 15 for the 20-minute session, with the fastest driver in each group receiving 4 points, the second fastest 2 with 1 point awarded to the third fastest.

== Pre-season testing results ==
Date	Location	Circuit	Fastest driver	Team	Fastest lap
2006
8 November	Le Castellet, France	Circuit Paul Ricard	(Italy) Marco Bonanomi	Prema Powerteam	1:17.074
9 November	Le Castellet, France	Circuit Paul Ricard	(United Kingdom) Ben Hanley	Red Devil Team Comtec	1:15.266
22 November	Vallelunga, Italy	Vallelunga circuit	(Spain) Álvaro Barba	International DracoRacing	1:23.042
23 November	Vallelunga, Italy	Vallelunga circuit	(Italy) Marco Bonanomi	Red Devil Team Comtec	1:22.293
29 November	Valencia, Spain	Circuit de Valencia	(Spain) Álvaro Barba	Red Devil Team Comtec	1:22.926
30 November	Valencia, Spain	Circuit de Valencia	(Spain) Miguel Molina	Pons Racing	1:21.954
2007
14 March	Barcelona, Spain	Circuit de Catalunya	(United Kingdom) Ben Hanley	Prema Powerteam	1:32.205
15 March	Barcelona, Spain	Circuit de Catalunya	(Italy) Davide Valsecchi	Epsilon Euskadi	1:31.582
27 March	Nürburg, Germany	Nürburgring	(Spain) Álvaro Barba	International DracoRacing	1:44.643
28 March	Nürburg, Germany	Nürburgring	(Spain) Álvaro Barba	International DracoRacing	1:44.145
25 April	Magny-Cours, France	Circuit de Nevers Magny-Cours	(Monaco) Clivio Piccione	RC Motorsport	1:25.248
26 April	Magny-Cours, France	Circuit de Nevers Magny-Cours	(Germany) Sebastian Vettel	Carlin Motorsport	1:24.541

== Teams and drivers ==
R = Series rookie for 2007

Team	No.	Driver name	Status	Races
(Austria) Interwetten.com	1	(Mexico) Salvador Durán	R	All
(Austria) Interwetten.com	2	(Russia) Daniil Move	R	All
(Italy) International DracoRacing	3	(Serbia) Miloš Pavlović		All
(Italy) International DracoRacing	4	(Spain) Álvaro Barba		All
(United Kingdom) Red Devil Team Comtec	5	(Netherlands) Jaap Van Lagen		1
(United Kingdom) Red Devil Team Comtec	5	(Romania) Michael Herck	R	2-9
(United Kingdom) Red Devil Team Comtec	6	(Spain) Alejandro Núñez	R	All
(United Kingdom) Carlin Motorsport	7	(Russia) Mikhail Aleshin		All
(United Kingdom) Carlin Motorsport	8	(Germany) Sebastian Vettel		1-4
(United Kingdom) Carlin Motorsport	8	(Germany) Michael Ammermüller	R	5-6
(United Kingdom) Carlin Motorsport	8	(Canada) Robert Wickens	R	7-9
(Italy) RC Motorsport	9	(Monaco) Clivio Piccione	R	All
(Italy) RC Motorsport	10	(Italy) Marco Bonanomi		All
(Italy) Victory Engineering	11	(Netherlands) Giedo van der Garde	R	All
(Italy) Victory Engineering	12	(United States) Charlie Kimball	R	1-6
(Italy) Victory Engineering	12	(Brazil) Alberto Valério		8
(Belgium) KTR	14	(France) Guillaume Moreau	R	All
(Belgium) KTR	15	(Belgium) Bertrand Baguette	R	All
(Italy) Prema Powerteam	16	(Netherlands) Xavier Maassen	R	All
(Italy) Prema Powerteam	18	(United Kingdom) Ben Hanley		All
(Italy) Cram Competition	19	(Malaysia) Fairuz Fauzy	R	All
(Italy) Cram Competition	20	(United Kingdom) Pippa Mann	R	All
(Spain) Epsilon Euskadi Redbull	21	(Portugal) Filipe Albuquerque	R	All
(Spain) Epsilon Euskadi Redbull	22	(Italy) Davide Valsecchi		All
(Spain) Pons Racing	23	(Spain) Miguel Molina		All
(Spain) Pons Racing	24	(Brazil) Carlos Iaconelli		All
(Italy) Eurointernational	25	(Spain) Celso Míguez		1-3
(Italy) Eurointernational	25	(Netherlands) Jaap Van Lagen		4-5
(Italy) Eurointernational	25	(Germany) Julian Theobald	R	6-8
(Italy) Eurointernational	26	(Italy) Alessandro Ciompi	R	1-6
(Italy) Eurointernational	26	(Germany) Johannes Theobald	R	7
(Italy) Eurointernational	26	(Switzerland) Giorgio Mondini		8
(Italy) GD Racing	27	(Argentina) Ricardo Risatti	R	1-5
(Italy) GD Racing	27	(Brazil) Luiz Razia	R	6-7
(Italy) GD Racing	27	(Belgium) Frédéric Vervisch		8-9
(Italy) GD Racing	28	(Italy) Pasquale Di Sabatino		All
(United Kingdom) Fortec Motorsport	29	(United Kingdom) James Walker	R	All
(United Kingdom) Fortec Motorsport	30	(France) Richard Philippe	R	1, 3-5, 8-9
(United Kingdom) Fortec Motorsport	30	(Netherlands) Yelmer Buurman	R	2, 6
(United Kingdom) Fortec Motorsport	30	(Argentina) Esteban Guerrieri	R	7
(France) Tech 1 Racing	31	(France) Julien Jousse	R	All
(France) Tech 1 Racing	32	(Portugal) Álvaro Parente		All

== Race calendar and results ==
Eight rounds formed meetings of the 2007 World Series by Renault season, with an additional round supporting the 2007 Monaco Grand Prix.

Round		Circuit	Date	Pole position	Fastest lap	Winning driver	Winning team	Rookie winner
1	R1	(Italy) Autodromo Nazionale Monza	14 April	(Russia) Mikhail Aleshin	(France) Julien Jousse	(Russia) Mikhail Aleshin	(United Kingdom) Carlin Motorsport	(Portugal) Filipe Albuquerque
1	R2	(Italy) Autodromo Nazionale Monza	15 April		(Netherlands) Giedo van der Garde	(Mexico) Salvador Durán	(Austria) Interwetten.com	(Mexico) Salvador Durán
2	R1	(Germany) Nürburgring	5 May	(Germany) Sebastian Vettel	(Germany) Sebastian Vettel	(Germany) Sebastian Vettel	(United Kingdom) Carlin Motorsport	(Portugal) Filipe Albuquerque
2	R2	(Germany) Nürburgring	6 May		(Serbia) Miloš Pavlović	(Italy) Davide Valsecchi	(Spain) Epsilon Euskadi	(Portugal) Filipe Albuquerque
3		Circuit de Monaco	27 May	(Portugal) Álvaro Parente	(Spain) Álvaro Barba	(Portugal) Álvaro Parente	(France) Tech 1 Racing	(Mexico) Salvador Durán
4	R1	(Hungary) Hungaroring	14 July	(France) Guillaume Moreau	(United Kingdom) Ben Hanley	(Portugal) Filipe Albuquerque	(Spain) Epsilon Euskadi	(Portugal) Filipe Albuquerque
4	R2	(Hungary) Hungaroring	15 July		(Italy) Marco Bonanomi	(Spain) Alejandro Núñez	(United Kingdom) Red Devil Team Comtec	(Spain) Alejandro Núñez
5	R1	(Belgium) Circuit de Spa-Francorchamps	18 August	(Malaysia) Fairuz Fauzy	(Portugal) Álvaro Parente	(Portugal) Álvaro Parente	(France) Tech 1 Racing	(Malaysia) Fairuz Fauzy
5	R2	(Belgium) Circuit de Spa-Francorchamps	19 August		(Monaco) Clivio Piccione	(Serbia) Miloš Pavlović	(Italy) International Draco Racing	(Mexico) Salvador Durán
6	R1	(United Kingdom) Donington Park	8 September	(Portugal) Álvaro Parente	(Spain) Álvaro Barba	(Spain) Álvaro Barba	(Italy) International Draco Racing	(France) Julien Jousse
6	R2	(United Kingdom) Donington Park	9 September		(Serbia) Miloš Pavlović	(United Kingdom) James Walker	(United Kingdom) Fortec Motorsport	(France) Guillaume Moreau
7	R1	(France) Circuit de Nevers Magny-Cours	22 September	(Monaco) Clivio Piccione	(United Kingdom) Ben Hanley	(United Kingdom) Ben Hanley	(Italy) Prema Powerteam	(Monaco) Clivio Piccione
7	R2	(France) Circuit de Nevers Magny-Cours	23 September		(Portugal) Filipe Albuquerque	(France) Guillaume Moreau	(Belgium) KTR	(France) Guillaume Moreau
8	R1	(Portugal) Autódromo do Estoril	20 October	(France) Julien Jousse	(Spain) Miguel Molina	(Spain) Miguel Molina	(Spain) Pons Racing	(France) Julien Jousse
8	R2	(Portugal) Autódromo do Estoril	21 October		(United Kingdom) Ben Hanley	(Serbia) Miloš Pavlović	(Italy) International Draco Racing	(Monaco) Clivio Piccione
9	R1	(Spain) Circuit de Catalunya	27 October	(Mexico) Salvador Durán	(Spain) Álvaro Barba	(Spain) Miguel Molina	(Spain) Pons Racing	(Mexico) Salvador Durán
9	R2	(Spain) Circuit de Catalunya	28 October		(Spain) Álvaro Barba	(United Kingdom) Ben Hanley	(Italy) Prema Powerteam	(Belgium) Bertrand Baguette

Notes:

- The round originally scheduled to take place at Istanbul Park on 23 June and 24 was cancelled by series organisers on 2 April. The Estoril circuit in Portugal hosted the replacement round, taking place over the weekend of 20 October and 21.

== Season results ==
- Points for both championships were awarded as follows:

Race											Qualifying		
Position	1st	2nd	3rd	4th	5th	6th	7th	8th	9th	10th	PP	2nd	3rd
**Feature**	15	12	10	8	6	5	4	3	2	1	**4**	2	1
**Sprint**	12	10	8	7	6	5	4	3	2	1			

In addition, two points were awarded for the fastest lap in each race.

The maximum number of points a driver could earn each weekend (except Monaco) was 31 and the maximum number for a team was 55.

=== Drivers' Championship ===
Pos	Driver	MNZ FEA (Italy)	MNZ SPR (Italy)	NÜR FEA (Germany)	NÜR SPR (Germany)	MON FEA (Monaco)	HUN FEA (Hungary)	HUN SPR (Hungary)	SPA FEA (Belgium)	SPA SPR (Belgium)	DON FEA (United Kingdom)	DON SPR (United Kingdom)	MAG FEA (France)	MAG SPR (France)	EST FEA (Portugal)	EST SPR (Portugal)	CAT FEA (Spain)	CAT SPR (Spain)	Points
1	(Portugal) Álvaro Parente	2	4	3	10	**1**	Ret	Ret	1	6	**4**	Ret	6	4	6	7	3	6	129
2	(United Kingdom) Ben Hanley	Ret	9	2	7	6	3	4	3	2	16	Ret	1	14	Ret	23	9	1	102
3	(Serbia) Miloš Pavlović	6	2	15	24	4	7	2	7	1	11	NC	4	Ret	9	1	4	4	96
4	(Portugal) Filipe Albuquerque	4	6	5	2	11	1	8	12	4	15	6	Ret	25	5	5	13	5	81
5	(Germany) Sebastian Vettel	5	3	**1**	6	2	4	3											74
6	(Netherlands) Giedo van der Garde	19†	12	7	19	5	6	6	6	5	21	12	5	6	4	4	6	DNS	67
7	(Spain) Miguel Molina	8	Ret	10	**3**	13	20	15	DNS	11	12	11	8	2	1	Ret	1	15	66
8	(Mexico) Salvador Durán	9	1	Ret	26	3	16	Ret	4	3	17	8	Ret	22	19	17	**2**	7	64
9	(Spain) Álvaro Barba	Ret	Ret	4	5	19	Ret	Ret	Ret	17	1	Ret	12	11	3	6	18	Ret	64
10	(France) Julien Jousse	16	7	19	Ret	16	5	7	21	14	2	7	9	3	**2**	9	19	19	62
11	(Malaysia) Fairuz Fauzy	12	10	Ret	22	Ret	2	Ret	**2**	Ret	Ret	10	Ret	Ret	8	3	12	8	51
12	(Russia) Mikhail Aleshin	**1**	19†	Ret	15	7	9	20	Ret	7	9	Ret	Ret	10	Ret	14	5	13	44
13	(Italy) Marco Bonanomi	3	18	6	Ret	10	DNQ	Ret	9	Ret	7	3	Ret	24	11	8	20	Ret	44
14	(France) Guillaume Moreau	Ret	Ret	9	4	9	**17**	9	Ret	Ret	8	2	10	**1**	23	12	Ret	Ret	43
15	(Monaco) Clivio Piccione	Ret	Ret	Ret	23	Ret	11	5	19†	15	Ret	Ret	**3**	7	10	**2**	17	22	42
16	(Italy) Davide Valsecchi	Ret	Ret	8	1	8	Ret	Ret	Ret	10	13	21	2	8	13	11	11	9	37
17	(Belgium) Bertrand Baguette	18	Ret	11	Ret	12	Ret	17	5	Ret	3	Ret	Ret	13	20	Ret	8	2	34
18	(Spain) Alejandro Núñez	Ret	13	13	11	Ret	8	1	11	8	14	9	13	9	Ret	22	10	**3**	31
19	(United Kingdom) James Walker	NC	14	24	18	14	12	10	20	Ret	10	**1**	Ret	18	7	20	15	10	19
20	(Netherlands) Yelmer Buurman			14	9						5	4							15
21	(Brazil) Carlos Iaconelli	13	Ret	17	13	15	Ret	12	8	Ret	24†	20†	7	5	17	Ret	14	21	13
22	(Germany) Michael Ammermüller								10	**DNS**	6	5	Ret	15					12
23	(Spain) Celso Míguez	7	5	25	Ret	20†													10
24	(United States) Charlie Kimball	Ret	8	16	8	Ret	10	**Ret**	13	Ret	Ret	13	Ret	17					7
25	(Canada) Robert Wickens														12	10	7	11	6
26	(Italy) Pasquale Di Sabatino	Ret	Ret	20	14	18	13	11	Ret	9	19	15	11	12	15	21	16	Ret	2
27	(United Kingdom) Pippa Mann	10	**15**	23	25†	DNQ	15	Ret	17	13	20	Ret	Ret	Ret	24	15	Ret	Ret	1
28	(Netherlands) Jaap Van Lagen	11	11				Ret	Ret	DNS	DNS									0
29	(Russia) Daniil Move	15	16	12	12	DNQ	21	19	16	16	22	17	14†	19	21	18	22	14	0
30	(Belgium) Frédéric Vervisch														14	Ret	21	12	0
31	(Romania) Michael Herck			21	20	DNQ	Ret	18	Ret	12	Ret	16	Ret	Ret	16	16	24	16	0
32	(Netherlands) Xavier Maassen	Ret	17	22	17	17	14	13	14	Ret	Ret	14	Ret	Ret	22	Ret	23	17	0
33	(France) Richard Philippe	17	Ret			DNQ	18	14	Ret	Ret					18	13	Ret	20	0
34	(Italy) Alessandro Ciompi	14	Ret	Ret	21	Ret	Ret	DNS	15	18	18	19	Ret	16					0
35	(Argentina) Ricardo Risatti	Ret	20	18	16	Ret	19	16	18	Ret									0
36	(Germany) Julian Theobald										23	18	Ret	23	26	Ret	25	18	0
37	(Germany) Johannes Theobald														25	19			0
38	(Brazil) Luiz Razia										Ret	Ret	Ret	20					0
39	(Argentina) Esteban Guerrieri												Ret	21					0
40	(Switzerland) Giorgio Mondini																26	Ret	0
—	(Brazil) Alberto Valerio																Ret	Ret	0
Pos	Driver	MNZ FEA (Italy)	MNZ SPR (Italy)	NÜR FEA (Germany)	NÜR SPR (Germany)	MON FEA (Monaco)	HUN FEA (Hungary)	HUN SPR (Hungary)	SPA FEA (Belgium)	SPA SPR (Belgium)	DON FEA (United Kingdom)	DON SPR (United Kingdom)	MAG FEA (France)	MAG SPR (France)	EST FEA (Portugal)	EST SPR (Portugal)	CAT FEA (Spain)	CAT SPR (Spain)	Points

Colour	Result
Gold	Winner
Silver	Second place
Bronze	Third place
Green	Points classification
Blue	Non-points classification
Blue	Non-classified finish (NC)
Purple	Retired, not classified (Ret)
Red	Did not qualify (DNQ)
Red	Did not pre-qualify (DNPQ)
Black	Disqualified (DSQ)
White	Did not start (DNS)
White	Withdrew (WD)
White	Race cancelled (C)
Blank	Did not practice (DNP)
Blank	Did not arrive (DNA)
Blank	Excluded (EX)

- Polesitter for feature race in **bold**
- Driver in italics has been awarded two points for fastest lap
- † — Drivers did not finish the race, but were classified as they completed over 90% of the race distance.
- **R** – Rookie Cup

=== Teams' Championship ===
Pos	Team	Car No.	MNZ FEA (Italy)	MNZ SPR (Italy)	NÜR FEA (Germany)	NÜR SPR (Germany)	MON FEA (Monaco)	HUN FEA (Hungary)	HUN SPR (Hungary)	SPA FEA (Belgium)	SPA SPR (Belgium)	DON FEA (United Kingdom)	DON SPR (United Kingdom)	MAG FEA (France)	MAG SPR (France)	EST FEA (Portugal)	EST SPR (Portugal)	CAT FEA (Spain)	CAT SPR (Spain)	Points
1	(France) Tech 1 Racing	31	16	7	19	Ret	16	5	7	21	14	2	7	9	3	**2**	9	19	19	191
1	(France) Tech 1 Racing	32	2	4	3	10	**1**	Ret	Ret	1	6	**4**	Ret	6	4	6	7	3	6	191
2	(Italy) International DracoRacing	3	6	2	15	24	4	7	2	7	1	11	NC	4	Ret	9	1	4	4	160
2	(Italy) International DracoRacing	4	Ret	Ret	4	5	19	Ret	Ret	Ret	17	1	Ret	12	11	3	6	18	Ret	160
3	(United Kingdom) Carlin Motorsport	7	**1**	19†	Ret	15	7	9	20	Ret	7	9	Ret	Ret	10	Ret	14	5	13	136
3	(United Kingdom) Carlin Motorsport	8	5	3	**1**	6	2	4	3	10	**DNS**	6	5	Ret	15	12	10	7	11	136
4	(Spain) Epsilon Euskadi	21	4	6	5	2	11	1	8	12	4	15	6	Ret	25	5	5	13	5	118
4	(Spain) Epsilon Euskadi	22	Ret	Ret	8	1	8	Ret	Ret	Ret	10	13	21	2	8	13	11	11	9	118
5	(Italy) Prema Powerteam	16	Ret	17	22	17	17	14	13	14	Ret	Ret	14	Ret	Ret	22	Ret	23	17	102
5	(Italy) Prema Powerteam	18	Ret	9	2	7	6	3	4	3	2	16	Ret	1	14	Ret	23	9	1	102
6	(Italy) RC Motorsport	9	Ret	Ret	Ret	23	Ret	11	5	19†	15	Ret	Ret	**3**	7	10	**2**	17	22	86
6	(Italy) RC Motorsport	10	3	18	6	Ret	10	DNQ	Ret	9	Ret	7	3	Ret	24	11	8	20	Ret	86
7	(Spain) Pons Racing	23	8	Ret	10	**3**	13	20	15	Ret	11	12	11	8	2	1	Ret	1	15	79
7	(Spain) Pons Racing	24	13	Ret	17	13	15	Ret	12	8	Ret	24†	20†	7	5	17	Ret	14	21	79
8	(Belgium) KTR	14	Ret	Ret	9	4	9	**17**	9	Ret	Ret	8	2	10	**1**	23	12	Ret	Ret	77
8	(Belgium) KTR	15	18	Ret	11	Ret	12	Ret	17	5	Ret	3	Ret	Ret	13	20	Ret	8	2	77
9	(Italy) Victory Engineering	11	19†	12	7	19	5	6	6	6	5	21	12	5	6	4	4	6	Ret	74
9	(Italy) Victory Engineering	12	Ret	8	16	8	Ret	10	**Ret**	13	Ret	Ret	13	Ret	17			Ret	Ret	74
10	(Austria) Interwetten.com	1	9	1	Ret	26	3	16	Ret	4	3	17	8	Ret	22	19	17	**2**	7	64
10	(Austria) Interwetten.com	2	15	16	12	12	DNQ	21	19	16	16	22	17	14†	19	21	18	22	14	64
11	(Italy) Cram Competition	19	12	10	Ret	22	Ret	2	Ret	**2**	Ret	Ret	10	Ret	Ret	8	3	12	8	52
11	(Italy) Cram Competition	20	10	**15**	23	25†	DNQ	15	Ret	17	13	20	Ret	Ret	Ret	24	15	Ret	Ret	52
12	(United Kingdom) Fortec Motorsport	29	NC	14	24	18	14	12	10	20	Ret	10	**1**	Ret	18	7	20	15	10	34
12	(United Kingdom) Fortec Motorsport	30	17	Ret	14	9	DNQ	18	14	Ret	Ret	5	4	Ret	21	18	13	Ret	20	34
13	(United Kingdom) Red Devil Team Comtec	5	11	11	21	20	DNQ	Ret	18	Ret	12	Ret	16	Ret	Ret	16	16	24	16	31
13	(United Kingdom) Red Devil Team Comtec	6	Ret	13	13	11	Ret	8	1	11	8	14	9	13	9	Ret	22	10	**3**	31
14	(Italy) EuroInternational	25	7	5	25	Ret	20†	Ret	Ret	DNS	DNS	23	18	Ret	23	26	Ret	25	18	10
14	(Italy) EuroInternational	26	14	Ret	Ret	21	Ret	Ret	DNS	15	18	18	19	Ret	16	25	19	26	Ret	10
15	(Italy) GD Racing	27	Ret	20	18	16	Ret	19	16	18	Ret	Ret	Ret	Ret	20	14	Ret	21	12	2
15	(Italy) GD Racing	28	Ret	Ret	20	14	18	13	11	Ret	9	19	15	11	12	15	21	16	Ret	2
Pos	Team	Car No.	MNZ FEA (Italy)	MNZ SPR (Italy)	NÜR FEA (Germany)	NÜR SPR (Germany)	MON FEA (Monaco)	HUN FEA (Hungary)	HUN SPR (Hungary)	SPA FEA (Belgium)	SPA SPR (Belgium)	DON FEA (United Kingdom)	DON SPR (United Kingdom)	MAG FEA (France)	MAG SPR (France)	EST FEA (Portugal)	EST SPR (Portugal)	CAT FEA (Spain)	CAT SPR (Spain)	Points

Colour	Result
Gold	Winner
Silver	Second place
Bronze	Third place
Green	Points classification
Blue	Non-points classification
Blue	Non-classified finish (NC)
Purple	Retired, not classified (Ret)
Red	Did not qualify (DNQ)
Red	Did not pre-qualify (DNPQ)
Black	Disqualified (DSQ)
White	Did not start (DNS)
White	Withdrew (WD)
White	Race cancelled (C)
Blank	Did not practice (DNP)
Blank	Did not arrive (DNA)
Blank	Excluded (EX)
