= 2006 World Series by Renault =

Seasons
- ← 2005 2007 →

The 2006 World Series by Renault was the second season of Renault Sport's series of events, with three different championships racing under one banner.

== Race calendar ==
Circuit	Date	Series
(Belgium) Zolder	29 April	All
(Belgium) Zolder	30 April	All
Circuit de Monaco	28 May	FR3.5
(Turkey) Istanbul Park	17 June	All
(Turkey) Istanbul Park	18 June	All
(Italy) Misano Circuit	15 July	All
(Italy) Misano Circuit	16 July	All
(Belgium) Circuit de Spa-Francorchamps	28 July	FR3.5
(Belgium) Circuit de Spa-Francorchamps	29 July	FR3.5
(Germany) Nürburgring	5 August	All
(Germany) Nürburgring	6 August	All
(United Kingdom) Donington Park	9 September	All
(United Kingdom) Donington Park	10 September	All
(France) Bugatti Circuit	30 September	All
(France) Bugatti Circuit	1 October	All
(Spain) Circuit de Catalunya	28 October	All
(Spain) Circuit de Catalunya	29 October	All

- Event in light blue is not part of the World Series, but is a championship round for the Formula Renault 3.5 Series.

== Championships ==
=== Formula Renault 3.5 Series ===
Pos.	Driver	Team	Points
1	(Sweden) Alx Danielsson	(United Kingdom) Comtec Racing	112
2	(Spain) Borja García	(Italy) RC Motorsport	107
3	(Venezuela) Pastor Maldonado	(Italy) Draco Multiracing USA	103
4	(Spain) Andy Soucek	(Austria) Interwetten.com	99
5	(Portugal) Álvaro Parente	(Italy) Victory Engineering	94

=== Eurocup Formula Renault 2.0 ===
Pos.	Driver	Team	Points
1	(Portugal) Filipe Albuquerque	(Germany) Motopark Academy	99
2	(New Zealand) Chris van der Drift	(Italy) JD Motorsport	91
3	(Netherlands) Carlo van Dam	(France) SG Formula	90
4	(Belgium) Bertrand Baguette	(Spain) Epsilon Euskadi	88
5	(Denmark) Kasper Andersen	(Italy) JD Motorsport	78

=== Eurocup Mégane Trophy ===
Pos.	Driver	Team	Points
1	(Netherlands) Jaap van Lagen	(Netherlands) Equipe Verschuur	149
2	(France) Matthieu Lahaye	(France) Tech 1 Racing	123
3	(Portugal) César Campaniço	Racing for Belgium	107
4	(France) Jean-Philippe Dayraut	(Spain) Epsilon Euskadi	98
5	(France) Bruce Lorgere-Roux	(France) Tech 1 Racing	68
