= 2005 Formula Renault 3.5 Series =

Seasons
- ← 2004 2006 →

The 2005 Formula Renault 3.5 Series was the first Formula Renault 3.5 Series season. The season began on 1 May at Zolder, Belgium and finished at Monza, Italy on 23 October after 17 races. Robert Kubica was crowned series champion.

== Teams and drivers ==
Team	No.	Driver	Rounds
(Italy) EuroInternational	1	(Switzerland) Giorgio Mondini	1-4, 6
(Italy) EuroInternational	1	(Brazil) Fábio Carbone	7-8
(Italy) EuroInternational	1	(United Kingdom) Danny Watts	9
(Italy) EuroInternational	2	(Italy) Matteo Meneghello	1-2, 4-9
(United Kingdom) Carlin Motorsport	3	(Austria) Andreas Zuber	All
(United Kingdom) Carlin Motorsport	4	(Australia) Will Power	1-8
(United Kingdom) Carlin Motorsport	4	(Switzerland) Giorgio Mondini	9
(Spain) Pons Racing	5	(Spain) Adrián Vallés	All
(Spain) Pons Racing	6	(Spain) Celso Míguez	All
(Spain) Epsilon Euskadi	7	(Spain) Félix Porteiro	All
(Spain) Epsilon Euskadi	8	(Poland) Robert Kubica	All
(Italy) Victory Engineering	9	(Italy) Enrico Toccacelo	1-5
(Italy) Victory Engineering	9	(Brazil) Danilo Dirani	7
(Italy) Victory Engineering	9	(Italy) Davide Rigon	8-9
(Italy) Victory Engineering	10	(Czech Republic) Tomas Kostka	1-7
(Italy) Victory Engineering	10	(United States) Richard Antinucci	9
(Italy) Avelon Formula	11	(Morocco) Mehdi Bennani	2-9
(Italy) Avelon Formula	11	(Italy) Ivan Bellarosa	1
(Italy) Avelon Formula	12	(Italy) Ivan Bellarosa	2-9
(Belgium) KTR	14	(Netherlands) Jaap van Lagen	All
(Belgium) KTR	15	(France) Tristan Gommendy	All
(France) Saulnier Racing	16	(France) Simon Pagenaud	All
(France) Saulnier Racing	17	(Japan) Ryo Fukuda	All
(Italy) Draco Multiracing USA	18	(Germany) Markus Winkelhock	All
(Italy) Draco Multiracing USA	19	(San Marino) Christian Montanari	All
(Italy) Cram Competition	20	(France) Damien Pasini	All
(Italy) Cram Competition	21	(France) Eric Salignon	1-7, 9
(Italy) Cram Competition	21	(United Kingdom) Ben Hanley	8
(France) DAMS	22	(Sweden) Alx Danielsson	1, 3-7
(France) DAMS	22	(United Kingdom) Alex Lloyd	2
(France) DAMS	22	(France) Nicolas Prost	8
(France) DAMS	22	(Italy) Ferdinando Monfardini	9
(France) DAMS	23	(Venezuela) Pastor Maldonado	1-2, 7-9
(France) DAMS	23	(Italy) Raffaele Giammaria	3-5
(Italy) GD Racing	24	(Serbia and Montenegro) Miloš Pavlović	All
(Italy) GD Racing	25	(Belgium) Frédéric Vervisch	1-4
(Italy) GD Racing	25	(France) Patrick Pilet	8-9
(Switzerland) Jenzer Motorsport	27	(France) Patrick Pilet	1-4
(Switzerland) Jenzer Motorsport	27	(United Kingdom) Ryan Sharp	5-9
(Switzerland) Jenzer Motorsport	28	(United States) Colin Fleming	All
(Austria) Interwetten.com	29	(Germany) Daniel la Rosa	1-7
(Austria) Interwetten.com	29	(Brazil) Carlos Iaconelli	9
(Austria) Interwetten.com	30	(Italy) Stefano Proetto	1
(Austria) Interwetten.com	30	(Germany) Sven Barth	2
(Austria) Interwetten.com	30	(Brazil) Fernando Rees	4-9
(Italy) RC Motorsport	31	(India) Karun Chandhok	1-4
(Italy) RC Motorsport	31	(Italy) Matteo Pellegrino	7-9
(Italy) RC Motorsport	32	(Italy) Giovanni Tedeschi	All

== Calendar ==
Eight rounds formed meetings of the 2005 World Series by Renault season, with an additional round supporting the Monaco Grand Prix.

Round		Circuit/Location	Country	Date
1	R1	Circuit Zolder	Belgium	1 May
1	R2	Circuit Zolder	Belgium	1 May
2	R	Circuit de Monaco, Monte Carlo	Monaco	22 May
3	R1	Circuit Ricardo Tormo, Valencia	Spain	4 June
3	R2	Circuit Ricardo Tormo, Valencia	Spain	4 June
4	R1	Bugatti Circuit, Le Mans	France	10 July
4	R2	Bugatti Circuit, Le Mans	France	10 July
5	R1	Circuito Urbano Bilbao	Spain	17 July
5	R2	Circuito Urbano Bilbao	Spain	17 July
6	R1	Motopark Oschersleben	Germany	7 August
6	R2	Motopark Oschersleben	Germany	7 August
7	R1	Donington Park, Leicestershire	United Kingdom	September 11
7	R2	Donington Park, Leicestershire	United Kingdom	September 11
8	R1	Autódromo do Estoril	Portugal	2 October
8	R2	Autódromo do Estoril	Portugal	2 October
9	R1	Autodromo Nazionale Monza	Italy	23 October
9	R2	Autodromo Nazionale Monza	Italy	23 October

== Results ==
Round		Circuit	Pole position	Fastest lap	Winning driver	Winning team	Report
1	R1	(Belgium) Circuit Zolder	(Italy) Enrico Toccacelo	(Germany) Markus Winkelhock	(Italy) Enrico Toccacelo	(Italy) Victory Engineering	Report
1	R2	(Belgium) Circuit Zolder	(Australia) Will Power	(Poland) Robert Kubica	(Poland) Robert Kubica	(Spain) Epsilon Euskadi	Report
2	R	Circuit de Monaco	(San Marino) Christian Montanari	(Italy) Enrico Toccacelo	(San Marino) Christian Montanari	(Italy) Draco Multiracing USA	Report
3	R1	(Spain) Circuit Ricardo Tormo	(Spain) Félix Porteiro	(France) Eric Salignon	(Spain) Félix Porteiro	(Spain) Epsilon Euskadi	Report
3	R2	(Spain) Circuit Ricardo Tormo	(Austria) Andreas Zuber	(France) Eric Salignon	(France) Tristan Gommendy	(Belgium) KTR	Report
4	R1	(France) Bugatti Circuit	(Germany) Markus Winkelhock	(Spain) Félix Porteiro	(Germany) Markus Winkelhock	(Italy) Draco Multiracing USA	Report
4	R2	(France) Bugatti Circuit	(Poland) Robert Kubica	(Netherlands) Jaap van Lagen	(Australia) Will Power	(United Kingdom) Carlin Motorsport	Report
5	R1	(Spain) Circuito Urbano Bilbao	(Poland) Robert Kubica	(Austria) Andreas Zuber	(Poland) Robert Kubica	(Spain) Epsilon Euskadi	Report
5	R2	(Spain) Circuito Urbano Bilbao	(Australia) Will Power	(Austria) Andreas Zuber	(Australia) Will Power	(United Kingdom) Carlin Motorsport	Report
6	R1	(Germany) Motopark Oschersleben	(Australia) Will Power	(France) Tristan Gommendy	(Poland) Robert Kubica	(Spain) Epsilon Euskadi	Report
6	R2	(Germany) Motopark Oschersleben	(Poland) Robert Kubica	(Austria) Andreas Zuber	(Poland) Robert Kubica	(Spain) Epsilon Euskadi	Report
7	R1	(United Kingdom) Donington Park	(Spain) Adrián Vallés	(France) Tristan Gommendy	(Spain) Adrián Vallés	(Spain) Pons Racing	Report
7	R2	(United Kingdom) Donington Park	(France) Eric Salignon	(Spain) Félix Porteiro	(Germany) Markus Winkelhock	(Italy) Draco Multiracing USA	Report
8	R1	(Portugal) Autódromo do Estoril	(France) Tristan Gommendy	(Austria) Andreas Zuber	(Austria) Andreas Zuber	(United Kingdom) Carlin Motorsport	Report
8	R2	(Portugal) Autódromo do Estoril	(Spain) Félix Porteiro	(Spain) Adrián Vallés	(Spain) Félix Porteiro	(Spain) Epsilon Euskadi	Report
9	R1	(Italy) Autodromo Nazionale Monza	(Spain) Félix Porteiro	(Germany) Markus Winkelhock	(Spain) Adrián Vallés	(Spain) Pons Racing	Report
9	R2	(Italy) Autodromo Nazionale Monza	(Spain) Félix Porteiro	(France) Tristan Gommendy	(Germany) Markus Winkelhock	(Italy) Draco Multiracing USA	Report

== Points System ==
Points were awarded at the end of each race according to the following system:

1st	2nd	3rd	4th	5th	6th	7th	8th	9th	10th
15	12	10	8	6	5	4	3	2	1

In addition:

- One point was awarded for Pole position for each race
- One point was awarded for Fastest lap for each race

The maximum number of points a driver could earn each weekend (except Monaco) was 34 and the maximum number for a team was 58.

== Standings ==
=== Driver standings ===
Pos	Driver	ZOL 1 (Belgium)	ZOL 2 (Belgium)	MON 1 (Monaco)	VAL 1 (Spain)	VAL 2 (Spain)	LMS 1 (France)	LMS 2 (France)	BIL 1 (Spain)	BIL 2 (Spain)	OSC 1 (Germany)	OSC 2 (Germany)	DON 1 (United Kingdom)	DON 2 (United Kingdom)	EST 1 (Portugal)	EST 2 (Portugal)	MNZ 1 (Italy)	MNZ 2 (Italy)	Points
1	(Poland) Robert Kubica	3	1	5	2	16†	3	2	1	8	1	1	3	6	2	3	Ret	Ret	154
2	(Spain) Adrián Vallés	6	6	3	4	2	13	7	10	6	5	7	1	2	Ret	Ret	1	2	116
3	(Germany) Markus Winkelhock	NC	3	DNS	11	12	1	5	Ret	7	Ret	3	5	1	4	2	3	1	114
4	(France) Tristan Gommendy	4	Ret	4	7	1	15	16	3	19†	2	2	NC	4	3	Ret	5	16	96
5	(Spain) Félix Porteiro	5	9	Ret	1	Ret	18	11	20	11	Ret	9	6	NC	5	1	2	4	77
6	(Austria) Andreas Zuber	2	2	DNS	Ret	10	7	8	22	16	3	10	19	Ret	1	7	Ret	5	73
7	(Australia) Will Power	DNS	DNS	12	3	14†	4	1	2	1	Ret	14	13	Ret	10	12			64
8	(San Marino) Christian Montanari	7	DNS	1	12	15†	12	6	6	10	11	17†	2	15	8	5	12	9	54
9	(Netherlands) Jaap van Lagen	18	10	2	14	Ret	DNS	NC	13	Ret	7	4	4	Ret	19	4	9	6	49
10	(France) Eric Salignon	15	Ret	14	23†	3	5	4	4	5	Ret	8	Ret	Ret			6	Ret	49
11	(France) Patrick Pilet	10	7	13	6	7	8	10							7	8	4	3	43
12	(Italy) Enrico Toccacelo	1	15†	6	10	Ret	6	9	5	20†									36
13	(United States) Colin Fleming	DNS	DNS	DNS	9	8		3	Ret	4	Ret	6	11	10	6	Ret	Ret	22	34
14	(France) Damien Pasini	11	5	7	20	4	Ret	13	17	Ret	6	11	20†	3	Ret	13	Ret	Ret	33
15	(Sweden) Alx Danielsson	DNS	DNS		8	Ret	DNS	14	8	2	4	Ret	7	9					32
16	(France) Simon Pagenaud	8	4	10	5	11	10	Ret	11	12	Ret	DNS	8	5	9	11	11	12	30
17	(Serbia and Montenegro) Miloš Pavlović	17	Ret	Ret	15	Ret	9	Ret	21	3	10	12	17	12	11	6	Ret	10	19
18	(Germany) Daniel la Rosa	DNS	DNS	8	13	13	2	Ret	12	Ret	8	Ret	24†	Ret					18
19	(Spain) Celso Míguez	12	16†	11	18	Ret	16	12	7	Ret	Ret	5	10	11	18	15	7	Ret	15
20	(Japan) Ryo Fukuda	9	8	9	17	9	14	17	9	13	14	Ret	Ret	14	14	16	18	19	11
21	(United Kingdom) Ryan Sharp								14	9	9	18†	16	Ret	24	Ret	Ret	7	8
22	(Brazil) Fabio Carbone												9	8	15	9			7
23	(Czech Republic) Tomas Kostka	14	Ret	18	Ret	5	11	DNS	Ret	DNS	12	Ret	22†	13					6
24	(Switzerland) Giorgio Mondini	16	Ret	15	Ret	6	DNS	DNS			Ret	Ret					20†	11	5
25	(Venezuela) Pastor Maldonado	20†	Ret	DNS									25	7	12	Ret	Ret	Ret	4
26	(Italy) Davide Rigon														16	10	8	14	4
27	(Italy) Matteo Meneghello	NC	13†	DNS					16	17	Ret	13	12	16	20	14	Ret	8	3
28	(Italy) Ferdinando Monfardini																10	13	1
29	(India) Karun Chandhok	13	11	Ret	16	Ret	DNS	DNS											0
30	(Belgium) Frédéric Vervisch	19	12	Ret	19	17	Ret	20											0
31	(Italy) Matteo Pellegrino												14	19	13	Ret	15	18	0
32	(United Kingdom) Danny Watts																13	15	0
33	(Morocco) Mehdi Bennani			Ret	Ret	18	21	18	DNQ	Ret	13	16	18	17	23	21	19	21	0
34	(Italy) Giovanni Tedeschi	NC	14†	Ret	21	Ret	Ret	15	15	15	Ret	15	15	18	Ret	17	14	Ret	0
35	(Brazil) Fernando Rees						17	Ret	18	14	Ret	Ret	23†	Ret	Ret	19	Ret	23†	0
36	(United States) Richard Antinucci																16	17	0
37	(Germany) Sven Barth			16															0
38	(Italy) Ivan Bellarosa	Ret	DNS	17	22	Ret	19	19	19	18	Ret	Ret	21†	Ret	21	18	17	Ret	0
39	(United Kingdom) Ben Hanley														17	Ret			0
40	(United Kingdom) Alex Lloyd			19†															0
41	(France) Nicolas Prost														22	20†			0
42	(Brazil) Carlos Iaconelli																Ret	20	0
43	(Italy) Raffaele Giammaria				Ret	Ret	20	DNS	Ret	DNS									0
44	(Brazil) Danilo Dirani												Ret	20†					0
-	(Italy) Stefano Proetto	DNS	DNS																0
Pos	Driver	ZOL 1 (Belgium)	ZOL 2 (Belgium)	MON 1 (Monaco)	VAL 1 (Spain)	VAL 2 (Spain)	LMS 1 (France)	LMS 2 (France)	BIL 1 (Spain)	BIL 2 (Spain)	OSC 1 (Germany)	OSC 2 (Germany)	DON 1 (United Kingdom)	DON 2 (United Kingdom)	EST 1 (Portugal)	EST 2 (Portugal)	MOZ 1 (Italy)	MOZ 2 (Italy)	Points

Colour	Result
Gold	Winner
Silver	Second place
Bronze	Third place
Green	Points classification
Blue	Non-points classification
Blue	Non-classified finish (NC)
Purple	Retired, not classified (Ret)
Red	Did not qualify (DNQ)
Red	Did not pre-qualify (DNPQ)
Black	Disqualified (DSQ)
White	Did not start (DNS)
White	Withdrew (WD)
White	Race cancelled (C)
Blank	Did not practice (DNP)
Blank	Did not arrive (DNA)
Blank	Excluded (EX)

- † = Driver did not finish but was classified, having completed more than 90% of race distance.

=== Team standings ===
Pos	Team	Car No.	ZOL 1 (Belgium)	ZOL 2 (Belgium)	MON 1 (Monaco)	VAL 1 (Spain)	VAL 2 (Spain)	LMS 1 (France)	LMS 2 (France)	BIL 1 (Spain)	BIL 2 (Spain)	OSC 1 (Germany)	OSC 2 (Germany)	DON 1 (United Kingdom)	DON 2 (United Kingdom)	EST FEA (Portugal)	EST SPR (Portugal)	MOZ FEA (Italy)	MOZ SPR (Italy)	Points
1	(Spain) Epsilon Euskadi	7	5	9	Ret	1	Ret	18*	11	20	11	Ret	9	6	NC*	5	1	2	4	230
1	(Spain) Epsilon Euskadi	8	3	1*	5	2	16†	3	2	1	8	1	1	3	6	2	3	Ret	Ret	230
2	(Italy) Draco Multiracing USA	18	NC*	3	DNS	11	12	1	5	Ret	7	Ret	3	5	1	4	2	3*	1	167
2	(Italy) Draco Multiracing USA	19	7	DNS	1	12	15†	12	6	6	10	11	17†	2	15	8	5	12	9	167
3	(Belgium) KTR	14	18	10	2	14	Ret	DNS	NC*	13	Ret	7	4	4	Ret	19	4	9	6	144
3	(Belgium) KTR	15	4	Ret	4	7	1	15	16	3	19†	2*	2	NC*	4	3	Ret	5	16*	144
4	(United Kingdom) Carlin Motorsport	3	2	2	DNS	Ret	10	7	8	22*	16*	3	10*	19	Ret	1*	7	Ret	5	135
4	(United Kingdom) Carlin Motorsport	4	DNS	DNS	12	3	14†	4	1	2	1	Ret	14	13	Ret	10	12	20†	11	135
5	(Spain) Pons Racing	5	6	6	3	4	2	13	7	10	6	5	7	1	2	Ret	Ret*	1	2	130
5	(Spain) Pons Racing	6	12	16†	11	18	Ret	16	12	7	Ret	Ret	5	10	11	18	15	7	Ret	130
6	(Italy) Cram Competition	20	11	5	7	20	4	Ret	13	17	Ret	6	11	20†	3	Ret	13	Ret	Ret	81
6	(Italy) Cram Competition	21	15	Ret	14	23†*	3*	5	4	4	5	Ret	8	Ret	Ret	17	Ret	6	Ret	81
7	(Switzerland) Jenzer Motorsport	27	10	7	13	6	7	8	10	14	9	9	18†	16	Ret	24	Ret	Ret	7	60
7	(Switzerland) Jenzer Motorsport	28	DNS	DNS	DNS	9	8		3	Ret	4	Ret	6	11	10	6	Ret	Ret	22	60
8	(Italy) Victory Engineering	9	1	15†	6*	10	Ret	6	9	5	20†			Ret	20†	16	10	8	14	46
8	(Italy) Victory Engineering	10	14	Ret	18	Ret	5	11	DNS	Ret	DNS	12	Ret	22†	13			16	17	46
9	(Italy) GD Racing	24	17	Ret	Ret	15	Ret	9	Ret	21	3	10	12	17	12	11	6	Ret	10	44
9	(Italy) GD Racing	25	19	12	Ret	19	17	Ret	20							7	8	4	3	44
10	(France) Saulnier Racing	16	8	4	10	5	11	10	Ret	11	12	Ret	DNS	8	5	9	11	11	12	41
10	(France) Saulnier Racing	17	9	8	9	17	9	14	17	9	13	14	Ret	Ret	14	14	16	18	19	41
11	(France) DAMS	22	DNS	DNS	19†	8	Ret	DNS	14	8	2	4	Ret	7	9	22	20†	10	13	37
11	(France) DAMS	23	20†	Ret	DNS	Ret	Ret	20	DNS	Ret	DNS			25	7	12	Ret	Ret	Ret	37
12	(Austria) Interwetten.com	29	DNS	DNS	8	13	13	2	Ret	12	Ret	8	Ret	24†	Ret			Ret	20	18
12	(Austria) Interwetten.com	30	DNS	DNS	16			17	Ret	18	14	Ret	Ret	23†	Ret	Ret	19	Ret	23†	18
13	(Italy) EuroInternational	1	16	Ret	15	Ret	6	DNS	DNS			Ret	Ret	9	8	15	9	13	15	15
13	(Italy) EuroInternational	2	NC	13†	DNS					16	17	Ret	13	12	16	20	14	Ret	8	15
14	(Italy) Avelon Formula	11	Ret	DNS	Ret	Ret	18	21	18	DNQ	Ret	13	16	18	17	23	21	19	21	0
14	(Italy) Avelon Formula	12			17	22	Ret	19	19	19	18	Ret	Ret	21†	Ret	21	18	17	Ret	0
Pos	Team	Car No.	ZOL 1 (Belgium)	ZOL 2 (Belgium)	MON 1 (Monaco)	VAL 1 (Spain)	VAL 2 (Spain)	LMS 1 (France)	LMS 2 (France)	BIL 1 (Spain)	BIL 2 (Spain)	OSC 1 (Germany)	OSC 2 (Germany)	DON 1 (United Kingdom)	DON 2 (United Kingdom)	EST FEA (Portugal)	EST SPR (Portugal)	MOZ FEA (Italy)	MOZ SPR (Italy)	Points

Colour	Result
Gold	Winner
Silver	Second place
Bronze	Third place
Green	Points classification
Blue	Non-points classification
Blue	Non-classified finish (NC)
Purple	Retired, not classified (Ret)
Red	Did not qualify (DNQ)
Red	Did not pre-qualify (DNPQ)
Black	Disqualified (DSQ)
White	Did not start (DNS)
White	Withdrew (WD)
White	Race cancelled (C)
Blank	Did not practice (DNP)
Blank	Did not arrive (DNA)
Blank	Excluded (EX)

- † = Driver did not finish but was classified, having completed more than 90% of race distance.
