= 2006 Formula Renault 3.5 Series =

Seasons
- ← 2005 2007 →

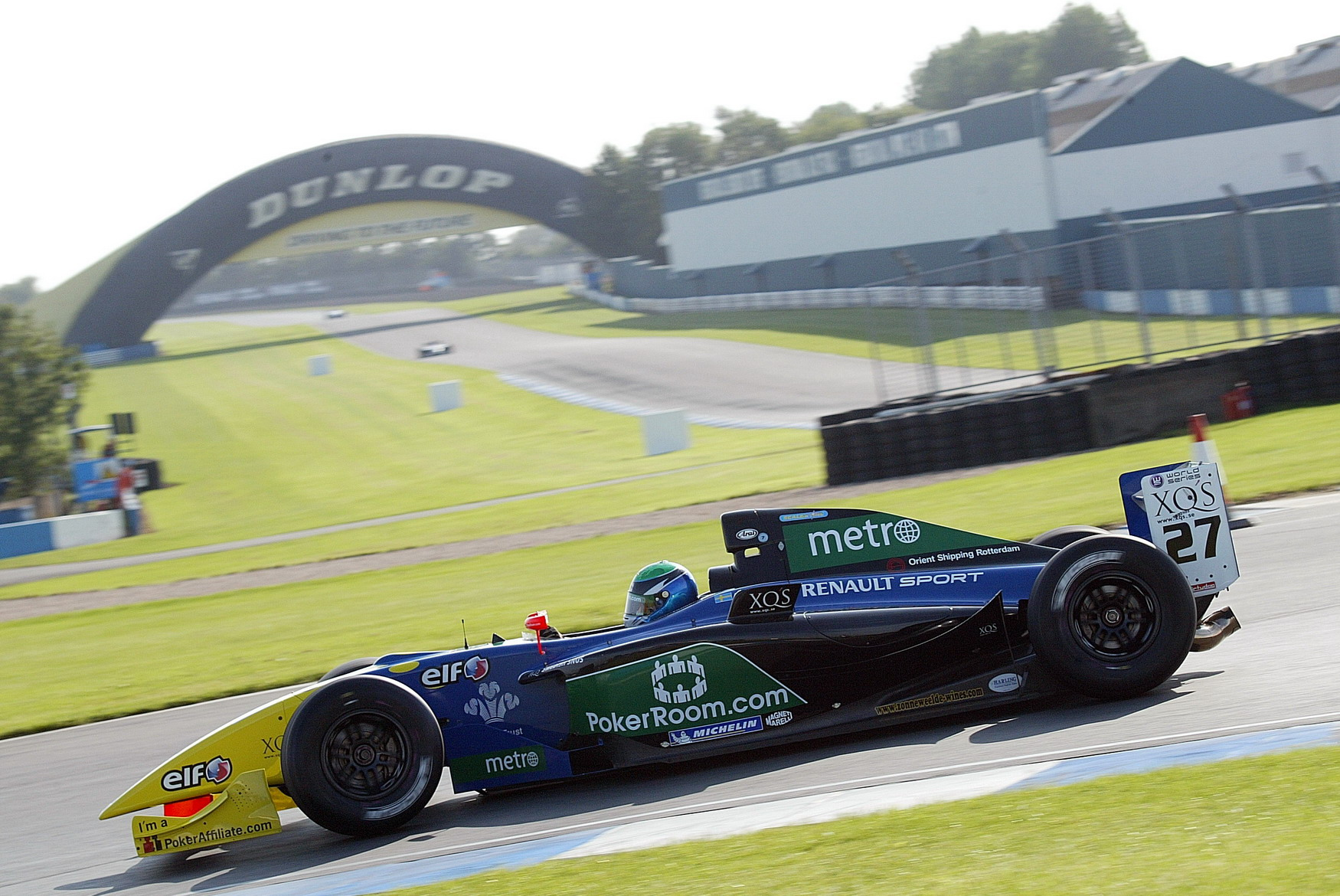
Alx Danielsson won the title by just five points.

The 2006 Formula Renault 3.5 Series was the second Formula Renault 3.5 Series season. It began on April 29 at Zolder, Belgium and finished in Barcelona, Spain on October 29 after 17 races.

== Teams and drivers ==
Team	No.	Driver name	Rounds
(Spain) Epsilon Euskadi	1	(United Kingdom) Steven Kane	All
(Spain) Epsilon Euskadi	2	(Italy) Davide Valsecchi	All
(Italy) Draco Multiracing USA	3	(Venezuela) Pastor Maldonado	All
(Italy) Draco Multiracing USA	4	(Czech Republic) Tomas Kostka	1-6
(Italy) Draco Multiracing USA	4	(Serbia) Miloš Pavlović	7-9
(Belgium) KTR	5	(United Kingdom) Robbie Kerr	All
(Belgium) KTR	6	(Canada) Sean McIntosh	All
(United Kingdom) Carlin Motorsport	7	(Russia) Mikhail Aleshin	All
(United Kingdom) Carlin Motorsport	8	(United States) Colin Fleming	1-3
(United Kingdom) Carlin Motorsport	8	(Germany) Sebastian Vettel	4-5
(United Kingdom) Carlin Motorsport	8	(South Africa) Adrian Zaugg	6–7, 9
(United Kingdom) Carlin Motorsport	8	(South Africa) Gavin Cronje	8
(Spain) Pons Racing	9	(Spain) Celso Míguez	1-6
(Spain) Pons Racing	9	(France) Tristan Gommendy	8-9
(Spain) Pons Racing	10	(United Kingdom) James Rossiter	All
(Italy) Cram Competition	11	(United Kingdom) Ben Hanley	All
(Italy) Cram Competition	12	(Serbia) Miloš Pavlović	1-4
(Italy) Cram Competition	12	(Italy) Pasquale Di Sabatino	5-9
(Switzerland) Jenzer Motorsport	14	(Spain) Álvaro Barba	All
(Switzerland) Jenzer Motorsport	15	(Italy) Alessandro Bonetti	1-6
(Switzerland) Jenzer Motorsport	15	(Spain) Marco Barba	7-9
(Italy) Victory Engineering	16	(Portugal) Álvaro Parente	All
(Italy) Victory Engineering	18	(Japan) Hayanari Shimoda	1-8
(Italy) Victory Engineering	18	(United Kingdom) Oliver Jarvis	9
(Italy) GD Racing	19	(Italy) Matteo Meneghello	1-5
(Italy) GD Racing	19	(Brazil) Carlos Iaconelli	7-9
(Italy) GD Racing	20	(France) Patrick Pilet	1-5
(Italy) GD Racing	20	(Spain) Miguel Molina	7-9
(Austria) Interwetten.com	21	(France) Eric Salignon	1-8
(Austria) Interwetten.com	21	(France) Franck Perera	9
(Austria) Interwetten.com	22	(Spain) Andy Soucek	All
(Italy) Eurointernational	23	(Italy) Enrico Toccacelo	1-4
(Italy) Eurointernational	23	(Serbia) Miloš Pavlović	5-6
(Italy) Eurointernational	23	(United Kingdom) Richard Keen	7
(Italy) Eurointernational	23	(Morocco) Mehdi Bennani	8
(Italy) Eurointernational	23	(Brazil) Alberto Valério	9
(Italy) Eurointernational	24	(Germany) Pascal Kochem	1
(Italy) Eurointernational	24	(Morocco) Mehdi Bennani	2
(Italy) Eurointernational	24	(Turkey) Jason Tahincioglu	3
(Italy) Eurointernational	24	(Brazil) Carlos Iaconelli	4-5
(Italy) Eurointernational	24	(Spain) Marcos Martínez	6-8
(Italy) Eurointernational	24	(Spain) Nil Montserrat	9
(Italy) RC Motorsport	25	(Spain) Borja García	All
(Italy) RC Motorsport	26	(France) Bruce Jouanny	All
(United Kingdom) Comtec Racing	27	(Sweden) Alx Danielsson	All
(United Kingdom) Comtec Racing	28	(United Kingdom) Edwin Jowsey	1
(United Kingdom) Comtec Racing	28	(Netherlands) Jaap van Lagen	2–3, 5
(United Kingdom) Comtec Racing	28	(Brazil) Carlos Iaconelli	6
(United Kingdom) Comtec Racing	28	(Spain) Celso Míguez	7-9
(Italy) Prema Powerteam	29	(Belgium) Gregory Franchi	All
(Italy) Prema Powerteam	30	(San Marino) Christian Montanari	All
(France) Tech 1 Racing	31	(Belgium) Jérôme d'Ambrosio	1-4
(France) Tech 1 Racing	31	(Italy) Marco Bonanomi	5-6
(France) Tech 1 Racing	31	(France) Patrick Pilet	7-9
(France) Tech 1 Racing	32	(Japan) Ryo Fukuda	All

== Calendar and race winners ==
Eight rounds formed meetings of the 2006 World Series by Renault season, with an additional round supporting the 2006 Monaco Grand Prix.

Round		Circuit	Date	Pole position	Fastest lap	Winning driver	Winning team
1	R1	(Belgium) Circuit Zolder	29 April	(San Marino) Christian Montanari	(Venezuela) Pastor Maldonado	(France) Eric Salignon	(Austria) Interwetten.com
1	R2	(Belgium) Circuit Zolder	30 April	(Italy) Davide Valsecchi	(United Kingdom) Ben Hanley	(France) Eric Salignon	(Austria) Interwetten.com
2		Circuit de Monaco	28 May	(San Marino) Christian Montanari	(Venezuela) Pastor Maldonado	(Venezuela) Pastor Maldonado	(Italy) Draco Multiracing USA
3	R1	(Turkey) Istanbul Park	17 June	(Spain) Andy Soucek	(Venezuela) Pastor Maldonado	(Spain) Andy Soucek	(Austria) Interwetten.com
3	R2	(Turkey) Istanbul Park	18 June	(Venezuela) Pastor Maldonado	(Italy) Enrico Toccacelo	(Portugal) Álvaro Parente	(Italy) Victory Engineering
4	R1	(Italy) Circuito Internazionale di Misano	15 July	(Venezuela) Pastor Maldonado	(United Kingdom) Ben Hanley	(United Kingdom) Ben Hanley	(United Kingdom) Carlin Motorsport
4	R2	(Italy) Circuito Internazionale di Misano	16 July	(Germany) Sebastian Vettel	(San Marino) Christian Montanari	(Germany) Sebastian Vettel	(United Kingdom) Carlin Motorsport
5	R1	(Belgium) Circuit de Spa-Francorchamps	28 July	(Venezuela) Pastor Maldonado	(Venezuela) Pastor Maldonado	(Venezuela) Pastor Maldonado	(Italy) Draco Multiracing USA
5	R2	(Belgium) Circuit de Spa-Francorchamps	29 July	(Venezuela) Pastor Maldonado	(Serbia) Miloš Pavlović	(Spain) Borja García	(Italy) RC Motorsport
6	R1	(Germany) Nürburgring	5 August	(Russia) Mikhail Aleshin	(France) Eric Salignon	(Portugal) Álvaro Parente	(Italy) Victory Engineering
6	R2	(Germany) Nürburgring	6 August	(Venezuela) Pastor Maldonado	(United Kingdom) Ben Hanley	(San Marino) Christian Montanari	(Italy) Prema Powerteam
7	R1	(United Kingdom) Donington Park	9 September	(South Africa) Adrian Zaugg	(Venezuela) Pastor Maldonado	(Sweden) Alx Danielsson	(United Kingdom) Comtec Racing
7	13	(United Kingdom) Donington Park	10 September	(Sweden) Alx Danielsson	(Sweden) Alx Danielsson	(Sweden) Alx Danielsson	(United Kingdom) Comtec Racing
8	R1	(France) Bugatti Circuit	30 September	(Sweden) Alx Danielsson	(United Kingdom) Steven Kane	(Sweden) Alx Danielsson	(United Kingdom) Comtec Racing
8	R2	(France) Bugatti Circuit	1 October	(France) Tristan Gommendy	(Venezuela) Pastor Maldonado	(Venezuela) Pastor Maldonado	(Italy) Draco Multiracing USA
9	R1	(Spain) Circuit de Catalunya	28 October	(Sweden) Alx Danielsson	(Sweden) Alx Danielsson	(Sweden) Alx Danielsson	(United Kingdom) Comtec Racing
9	R2	(Spain) Circuit de Catalunya	29 October	(Canada) Sean McIntosh	(United Kingdom) Robbie Kerr	(Portugal) Álvaro Parente	(Italy) Victory Engineering

Note:

- Pastor Maldonado originally won the first race at Misano, but was disqualified for a technical infringement. His team, Draco Multiracing USA, appealed the decision, but on January 24, 2007, the Italian National Court of Appeal for Motorsport upheld the original ruling.
- Borja García originally won the second race at Spa, but was disqualified for a technical infringement. However, on October 27, 2006, a court decided to revoke the disqualification and returned the win and points to both the driver and the team. His team, RC Motorsport, did however receive a financial penalty for the infringement.

== Points system ==
Points were awarded at the end of each race according to the following system:

1st	2nd	3rd	4th	5th	6th	7th	8th	9th	10th
15	12	10	8	6	5	4	3	2	1

In addition:

- One point was awarded for Pole position for each race
- One point was awarded for fastest lap for each race

The maximum number of points a driver could earn each weekend (except Monaco) was 34 and the maximum number for a team was 58.

== Championship standings ==
=== Drivers' Championship ===
Pos	Driver	ZOL 1 (Belgium)	ZOL 2 (Belgium)	MON 1 (Monaco)	IST 1 (Turkey)	IST 2 (Turkey)	MIS 1 (Italy)	MIS 2 (Italy)	SPA 1 (Belgium)	SPA 2 (Belgium)	NÜR 1 (Germany)	NÜR 2 (Germany)	DON 1 (United Kingdom)	DON 2 (United Kingdom)	LMS 1 (France)	LMS 2 (France)	BAR 1 (Spain)	BAR 2 (Spain)	Points
1	(Sweden) Alx Danielsson	4	10	Ret	6	Ret	6	7	Ret	Ret	5	2	1	**1**	**1**	NC	**1**	5	112
2	(Spain) Borja García	3	2	DNQ	2	Ret	5	17	4	1	2	6	6	3	11	3	23†	9	107
3	(Venezuela) Pastor Maldonado	8	3	1	11	**Ret**	**DSQ**	Ret	**1**	**2**	6	**22**†	8	Ret	Ret	1	10	2	102
4	(Spain) Andy Soucek	Ret	5	10	**1**	12	3	5	3	3	12	3	4	5	7	Ret	2	NC	99
5	(Portugal) Álvaro Parente	DNS	DNQ	6	3	1	4	4	Ret	4	1	Ret	17	Ret	12	11	3	1	94
6	(Canada) Sean McIntosh	25†	DNQ	11	4	6	Ret	10	2	Ret	7	4	5	13	9	Ret	5	**3**	63
7	(San Marino) Christian Montanari	**2**	16	**Ret**	9	Ret	Ret	Ret	7	21	11	1	11	Ret	3	14	7	4	58
8	(United Kingdom) Ben Hanley	10	17†	Ret	Ret	4	1	2	Ret	7	10	13	10	6	10	20†	16	7	55
9	(France) Eric Salignon	1	1	20	17	23†	22	8	9	5	NC	7	14	11	18	9			48
10	(Italy) Davide Valsecchi	DNS	**15**	DNQ	5	3	Ret	3	8	Ret	8	12	16	7	17	5	15	Ret	43
11	(Serbia) Miloš Pavlović	20	6	9	13	21	17	14	15	23	4	Ret	3	8	2	Ret	Ret	18†	41
12	(Russia) Mikhail Aleshin	13	Ret	15	23†	2	7	16	Ret	6	**3**	21	7	9	19	Ret	8	13	41
13	(South Africa) Adrian Zaugg										17	8	**2**	2			6	Ret	33
14	(United Kingdom) James Rossiter	5	Ret	2	Ret	5	9	6	Ret	24	Ret	Ret	Ret	Ret	16	17	9	Ret	33
15	(Germany) Sebastian Vettel						2	**1**	Ret	DNS									28
16	(Japan) Ryo Fukuda	11	Ret	17	12	10	12	9	12	13	16	5	19	4	Ret	4	Ret	Ret	25
17	(United Kingdom) Robbie Kerr	7	Ret	7	Ret	Ret	10	Ret	22†	DSQ	15	10	12	10	4	21†	Ret	Ret	20
18	(United States) Colin Fleming	6	DNQ	4	8	8													19
19	(France) Tristan Gommendy														8	**2**	NC	Ret	16
20	(United Kingdom) Steven Kane	22	4	16	20	18	14	18	10	10	Ret	20	15	17	21	10	12	8	15
21	(France) Patrick Pilet	21†	Ret	13	Ret	7	15	12	21†	14			13	14	5	7	14	19†	14
22	(France) Franck Perera																4	6	13
23	(Japan) Hayanari Shimoda	24†	13	5	7	17	Ret	Ret	14	11	Ret	9	Ret	12	14	13			12
24	(Spain) Celso Míguez	Ret	Ret	Ret	10	Ret	13	11	13	16	13	15	Ret	18	6	6	Ret	Ret	11
25	(Belgium) Gregory Franchi	15	12	3	Ret	19	11	Ret	18	15	18	16	23	15	23	Ret	17	Ret	10
26	(Spain) Álvaro Barba	Ret	7	Ret	22	Ret	Ret	13	6	12	Ret	14	22	23	15	Ret	Ret	15	9
27	(Italy) Enrico Toccacelo	9	8	DNQ	15	20	8	15											9
28	(Netherlands) Jaap van Lagen			Ret	Ret	9			5	Ret									8
29	(France) Bruce Jouanny	17	9	14	19	13	21	Ret	Ret	22	14	11	9	19	20	8	13	11	7
30	(Czech Republic) Tomáš Kostka	14	14	8	Ret	15	20	Ret	20†	9	Ret	17							5
31	(Italy) Marco Bonanomi								Ret	8	9	Ret							5
32	(Spain) Miguel Molina												18	22	13	15	11	10	1
33	(Brazil) Carlos Iaconelli						Ret	21	11	17	Ret	19	21	16	26†	12	21	14	0
34	(Germany) Pascal Kochem	12	11																0
35	(Italy) Matteo Meneghello	16	DNQ	18	18	11	18	20	17	18									0
36	(Belgium) Jérôme d'Ambrosio	19	19†	12	14	22	16	19											0
37	(United Kingdom) Oliver Jarvis																20	12	0
38	(Italy) Alessandro Bonetti	18	18†	19	16	14	19	Ret	19	20	19	Ret							0
39	(Italy) Pasquale Di Sabatino								16	19	20	18	24	20	25	16	24	Ret	0
40	(Turkey) Jason Tahincioglu				21	16													0
41	(Spain) Marco Barba												Ret	Ret	22	18	18	16	0
42	(Spain) Nil Montserrat																22	17	0
43	(Morocco) Mehdi Bennani			DNQ											Ret	19			0
44	(Brazil) Alberto Valerio																19	Ret	0
45	(United Kingdom) Richard Keen												20	21					0
46	(United Kingdom) Edwin Jowsey	23	DNQ																0
47	(South Africa) Gavin Cronje														24	Ret			0
	(Spain) Marcos Martínez										NC	Ret	Ret	Ret	DNS	Ret			0
Pos	Driver	ZOL 1 (Belgium)	ZOL 2 (Belgium)	MON 1 (Monaco)	IST 1 (Turkey)	IST 2 (Turkey)	MIS 1 (Italy)	MIS 2 (Italy)	SPA 1 (Belgium)	SPA 2 (Belgium)	NÜR 1 (Germany)	NÜR 2 (Germany)	DON 1 (United Kingdom)	DON 2 (United Kingdom)	LMS 1 (France)	LMS 2 (France)	BAR 1 (Spain)	BAR 2 (Spain)	Points

Colour	Result
Gold	Winner
Silver	Second place
Bronze	Third place
Green	Points classification
Blue	Non-points classification
Blue	Non-classified finish (NC)
Purple	Retired, not classified (Ret)
Red	Did not qualify (DNQ)
Red	Did not pre-qualify (DNPQ)
Black	Disqualified (DSQ)
White	Did not start (DNS)
White	Withdrew (WD)
White	Race cancelled (C)
Blank	Did not practice (DNP)
Blank	Did not arrive (DNA)
Blank	Excluded (EX)

- Polesitter for feature race in **bold**
- Driver in italics has been awarded two points for fastest lap
- † — Drivers did not finish the race, but were classified as they completed over 90% of the race distance.

Notes:

- Miloš Pavlović set the fastest lap in the sprint race at Donington Park, but was not awarded the two bonus points because of a yellow flag infringement

=== Teams ===
Pos	Team	Points	Wins	F/laps
1	(Austria) Interwetten.com	160	3	1
2	(Italy) Draco Multiracing USA	132	3	6
3	(United Kingdom) Comtec Racing	130	4	2
4	(United Kingdom) Carlin Motorsport	121	1	
5	(Italy) RC Motorsport	116	1	
6	(Italy) Victory Engineering	106	3	
7	(Belgium) KTR	83		1
8	(Italy) Prema Powerteam	68	1	1
9	(Italy) Cram Competition	62	1	3
10	(Spain) Epsilon Euskadi	58		1
11	(Spain) Pons Racing	50		
12	(France) Tech 1 Racing	40		
13	(Italy) Eurointernational	18		2
14	(Switzerland) Jenzer Motorsport	9		
15	(Italy) GD Racing	5		
