= Dallara T05 =

Open-wheel formula racing car built by Dallara

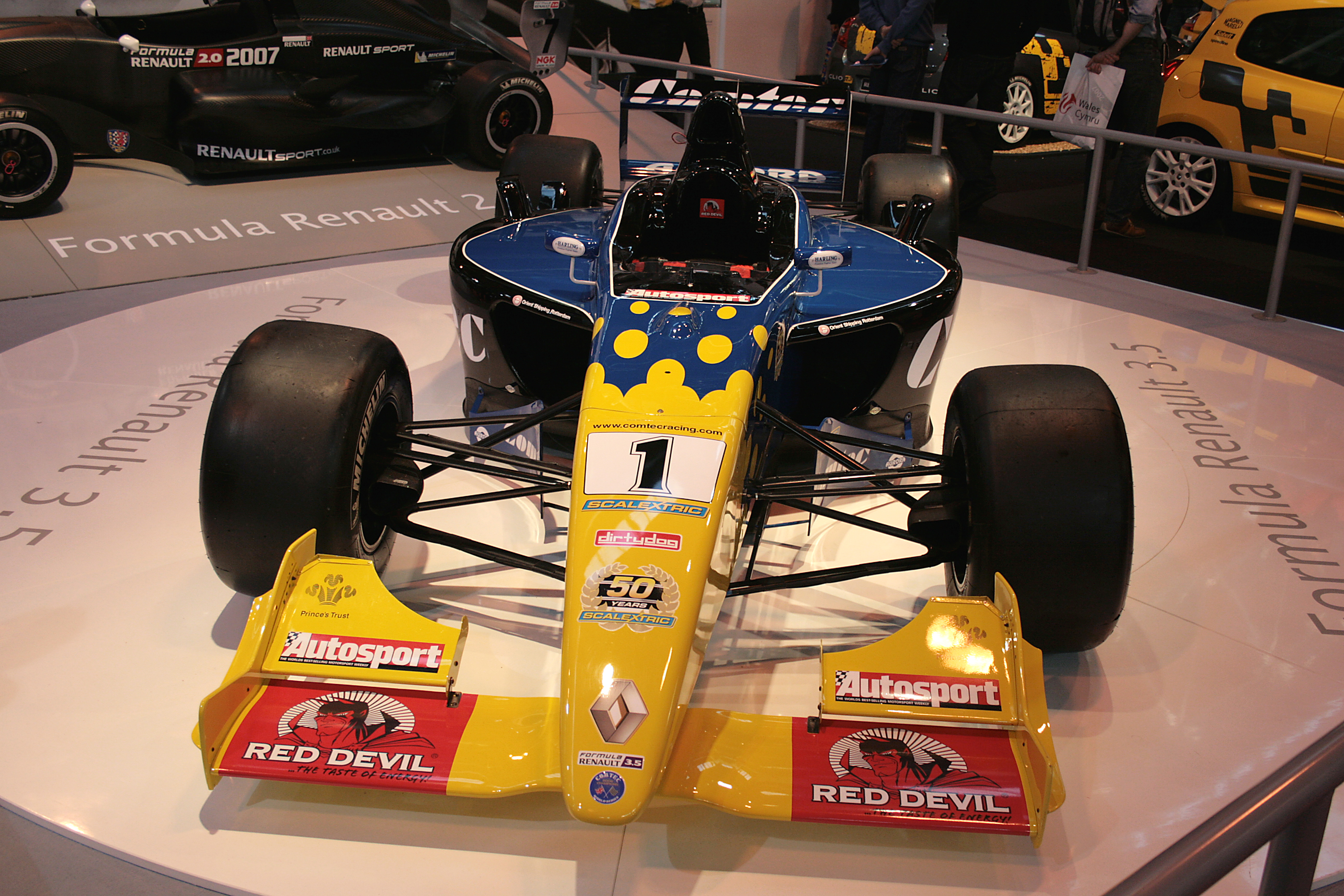
- Category: Formula Renault 3.5 Series
- Constructor: Dallara
- Designer: Giampaolo Dallara
- Predecessor: Dallara SN01
- Successor: Dallara T08

Technical specifications
- Chassis: Carbon-fibre monocoque with honeycomb structure
- Suspension (front): Pushrods, single vertically-mounted adjustable four-tube shock absorber
- Suspension (rear): Pushrods, double adjustable four-tube shock absorber
- Width: 1,930 mm (76 in)
- Height: 1,050 mm (41 in)
- Axle track: Front: 1,630 mm (64 in); Rear: 1,529 mm (60 in)
- Wheelbase: 3,125 mm (123 in)
- Engine: Renault VQ35 V6 prepared by Solution F 3,498 cc (213 cu in) V6 DOHC 60° cylinder angle normally-aspirated mid-mounted
- Transmission: 6-speed semi-automatic gearbox
- Power: 425 hp (317 kW; 431 PS); 510 N⋅m (376 lb⋅ft)
- Weight: 628 kg (1,385 lb) (excluding driver); 703 kg (1,550 lb) (including driver)
- Fuel: Elf
- Lubricants: Elf
- Tyres: Michelin; O.Z. racing wheels

Competition history
- Notable entrants: All Formula Renault 3.5 Series teams
- Notable drivers: All Formula Renault 3.5 Series drivers
- Debut: 2005 Zolder Formula Renault 3.5 Series round
- Last event: 2007 Catalunya Formula Renault 3.5 Series round
Races	Wins	Poles	F/Laps
54	54	54	54
- Constructors' Championships: Epsilon Euskadi (2005); Interwetten.com (2006); Tech 1 Racing (2007)
- Drivers' Championships: Robert Kubica (2005); Alx Danielsson (2006); Álvaro Parente (2007)

The Dallara T05 is an open-wheel formula racing car, designed, developed and made by Italian manufacturer Dallara, that competed in the one-make Formula Renault 3.5 Series spec-series, from 2005 to 2007. The car debuted at the 2005 Zolder Formula Renault 3.5 Series round.
