= Dallara T08 =

Open-wheel formula racing car built by Dallara

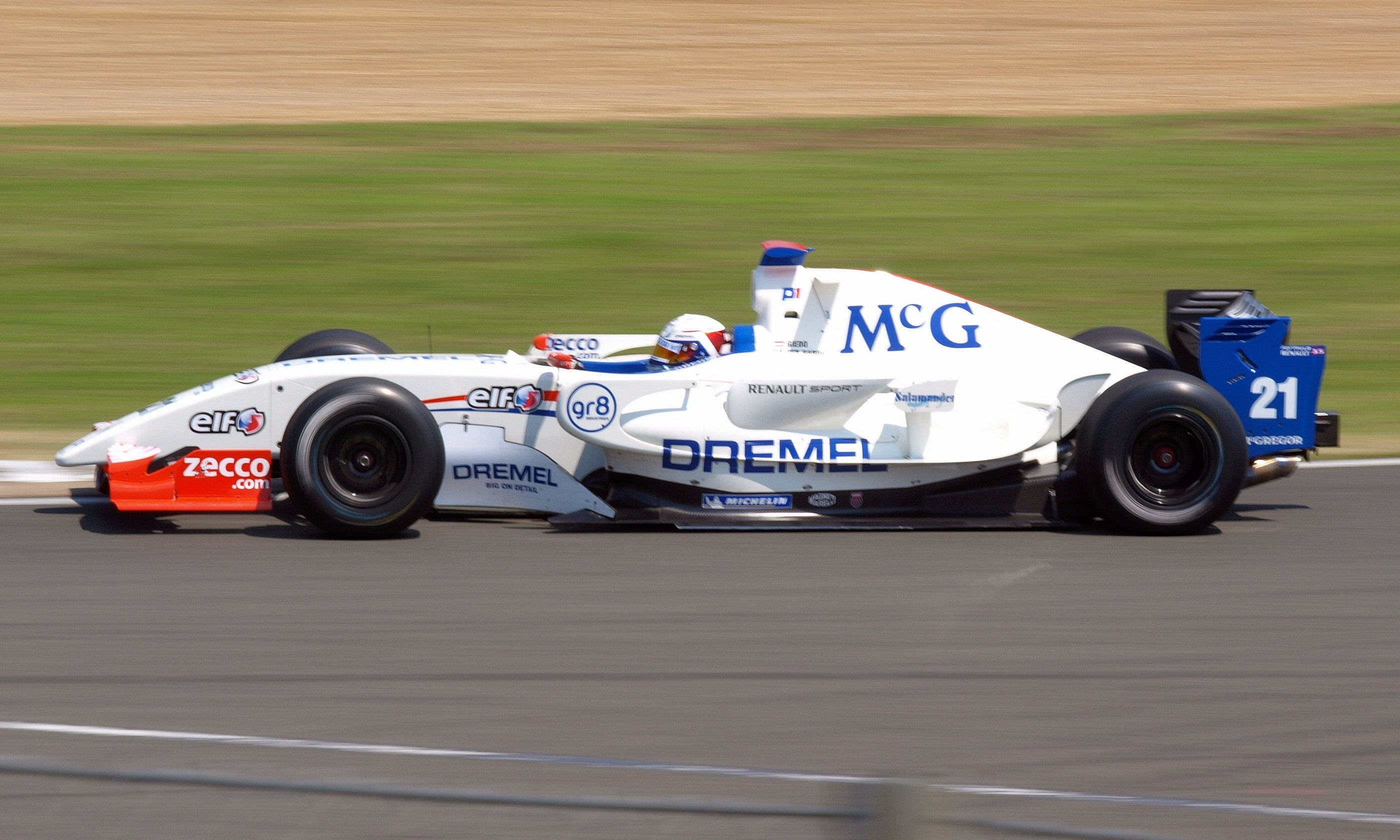
- Giedo van der Garde, 2008 Silverstone WSR 3.5 round, in the original 2008 aerodynamic configuration.
- Category: World Series Formula V8 3.5
- Constructor: Dallara
- Designer(s): Luca Pignacca; Andrea Toso
- Predecessor: Dallara T05
- Successor: Dallara T12

Technical specifications
- Chassis: Carbon-fibre monocoque with honeycomb structure
- Suspension (front): Pushrods, single vertically-mounted adjustable four-tube shock absorber
- Suspension (rear): Pushrods, double adjustable four-tube shock absorber
- Width: 1,930 mm (76 in)
- Height: 1,050 mm (41 in)
- Axle track: Front: 1,630 mm (64 in); Rear: 1,529 mm (60 in)
- Wheelbase: 3,125 mm (123 in)
- Engine: Renault VQ35 V6 prepared by Solution F 3,498 cc (213 cu in) V6 DOHC 60° cylinder angle normally-aspirated mid-mounted
- Transmission: 6-speed semi-automatic gearbox
- Power: 485 horsepower (362 kilowatts); 600 newton-metres (440 pound force-feet)
- Weight: 628 kg (1,385 lb) (excluding driver); 703 kg (1,550 lb) (including driver)
- Fuel: Elf
- Lubricants: Elf
- Tyres: Michelin; O.Z. racing wheels

Competition history
- Notable entrants: All Formula Renault 3.5 Series teams
- Notable drivers: All Formula Renault 3.5 Series drivers
- Debut: 2008 Monza Formula Renault 3.5 Renault Series round
- Last event: 2011 Catalunya Formula Renault 3.5 Series round
Races	Wins	Poles	F/Laps
68	68	68	68
- Constructors' Championships: Tech 1 Racing (2008, 2010); International DracoRacing (2009); Carlin (2011)
- Drivers' Championships: Giedo van der Garde (2008); Bertrand Baguette (2009); Mikhail Aleshin (2010); Robert Wickens (2011)

The Dallara T08 was a racing car developed by Italian manufacturer Dallara for use in the Formula Renault 3.5 series, and was in use from 2008 to 2011. The T08 is the second generation of car used by the World Series by Renault/WS Formula V8 3.5, and was introduced at Circuit de Nevers Magny-Cours. The carbon tub of the car would later be carried over to its successor, the Dallara T12.

== Design ==
The new car featured flex-fuel technology and could be powered by either premium unleaded petrol or E85 bioethanol, which was a first for this level of motorsport in Europe. The Renault V6 engine, prepared by French company Solution F, also saw its power increased from 425 horsepower (317 kW) to 500 horsepower (370 kW).

The car also featured a new carbon bodyshell, as well as a new shaped front wing, hollowed sidepods and multiple side deflectors designed to improve aerodynamic performance. However, several areas of the car, including the gearbox, rear suspension and carbon brakes, remained the same in order to keep costs under control.

The new car made its first public appearance on 21 September at the Magny-Cours round of the 2007 season, with development driver Andy Soucek demonstrating the car at the final round of the series in Barcelona.

== Subsequent Development and Changes ==
=== 2009 FR 3.5 Series ===
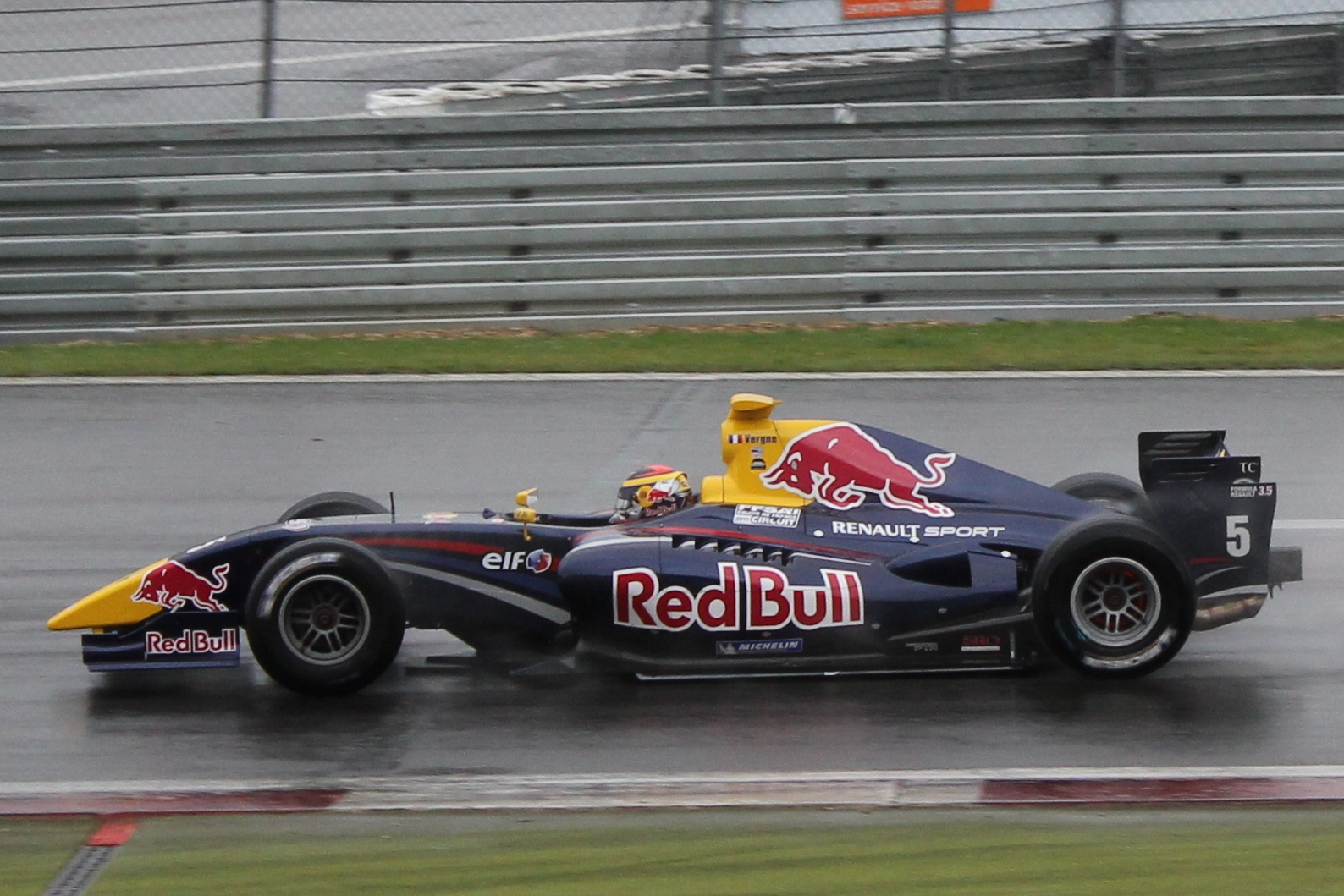
Jean-Éric Vergne, 2011 Nürburgring WSR round, in the 2009 Aerodynamic Configuration

The car underwent a number of changes to its aerodynamic configuration, in line with the 2009 Formula One technical changes. This saw the removal of the cars bargeboards, sidepod chimneys, and the flip-ups ahead of the rear wheel.

=== 2010 FR 3.5 Series ===
Following the 2009 season, a few changes were made to the car, under the series Technical Regulations for the 2010 Formula Renault 3.5 Series. The engines were re–tuned from 8,200 RPM to 8,500 RPM, with Boost control being banned.
