= Alx Danielsson =

Swedish racing driver

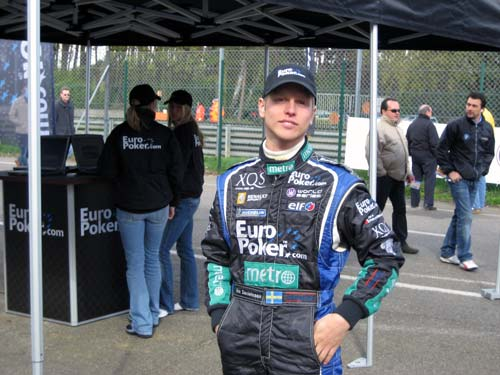
- Danielsson testing in England, 2006.
- Nationality: (Sweden) Swedish
- Born: Dennis Mikael Alexander Danielsson; 1 April 1981 (age 45) Östersund, Sweden
- Relatives: Alexia Danielsson (daughter)

Swedish V8 Thundercar Series career
- Debut season: 2013
- Categorisation: FIA Gold

Previous series
- 2000 2001–2003 2002 2004 2005–2007 2005–2006 2007 2009 2011 2012 2013 2013 2014, 2016: Swedish Formula Ford Zetec; British Formula Ford; British Formula Ford Winter Series; Formula Renault V6 Eurocup; Porsche Carrera Cup Scandinavia; Formula Renault 3.5 Series; Formula 3000 Euroseries; Ferrari Scandinavia Challenge; Swedish Touring Car Championship; Camaro Cup NASCAR K&N Pro Series East; NASCAR Nationwide Series; ARCA Racing Series

Championship titles
- 2000 2002 2006 2009: Swedish Formula Ford Zetec; British Formula Ford Winter; Formula Renault 3.5 Series; Ferrari Scandinavia Challenge

NASCAR O'Reilly Auto Parts Series career
- 1 race run over 1 year
- 2013 position: 86th
- Best finish: 86th (2013)
- First race: 2013 Nationwide Children's Hospital 200 (Mid-Ohio)
| Wins | Top tens | Poles |
|---|---|---|
| 0 | 0 | 0 |
- Statistics up to date as of 16 November 2013.

Dennis Mikael Alexander "Alx" Danielsson (born 1 April 1981) is a Swedish racing driver and the 2006 champion of the Formula Renault 3.5 Series. He currently competes in the Swedish V8 Thundercar Series and in the Porsche Sprint Challenge Iberica for AF Motorsport alongside former F1 Academy driver Chloe Grant. He is also a fill-in driver on the Monster Jam circuit.

== Career ==
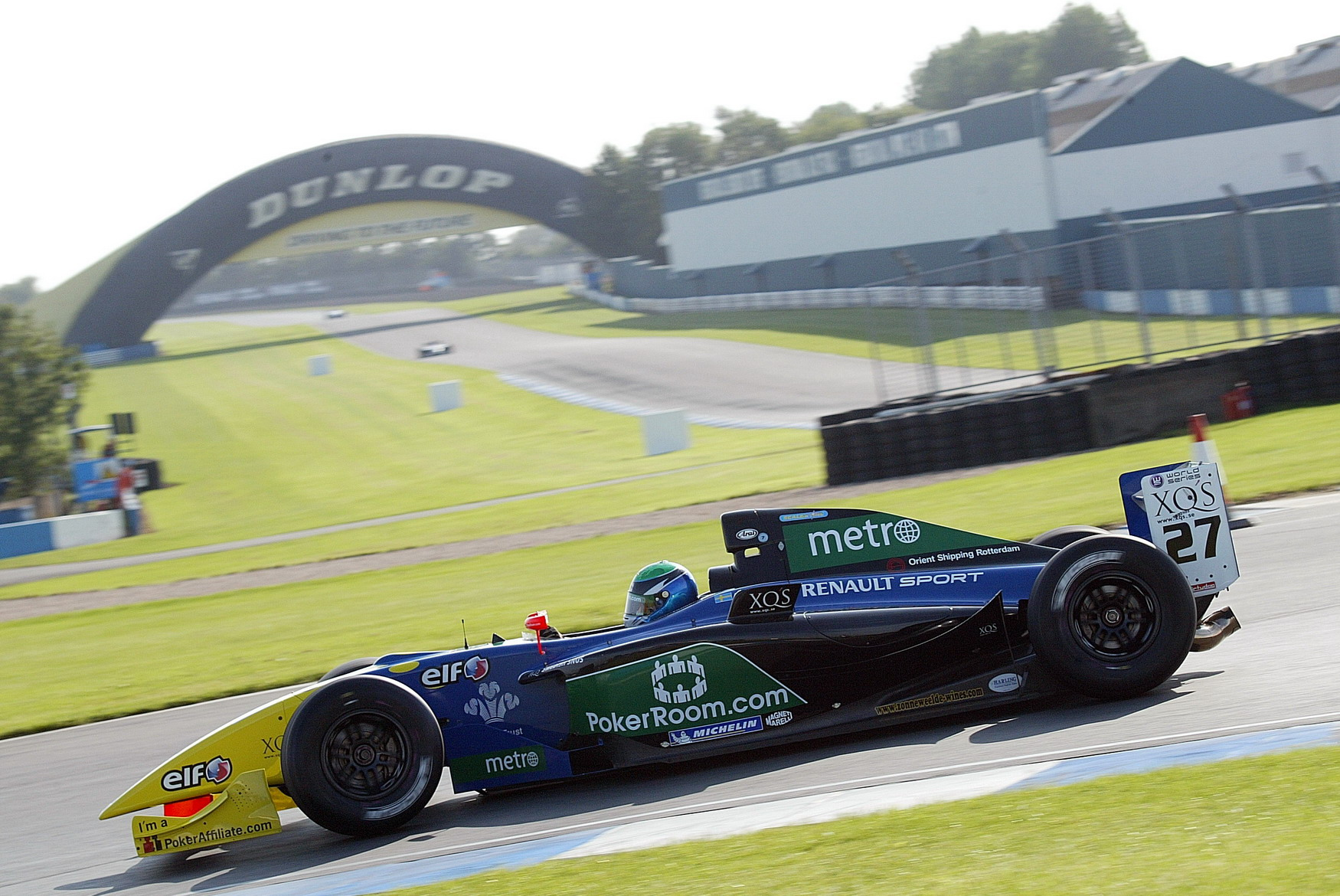
Danielsson racing at Donington Park, 2006.

Danielsson's career started in karting in 1998, where he stayed until 1999 before moving up to Formula Ford. In 2004 Danielsson progressed to Formula Renault V6 in Europe and Asia before moving onto the Formula Renault 3.5 Series in Europe.

In 2006, Danielsson competed in the Formula Renault 3.5 Series for the British team Comtec Racing and doing exceptionally well. After suffering two hard crashes that could have ended his season at the Spa circuit in Belgium, he managed to take a double win at Donington on 9 and 10 September 2006. He was then able to follow up the victories with a third straight victory at Le Mans on 30 September and a fourth victory in Barcelona on 28 October. The following day, he clinched the FR3.5 Series title via a fifth place in the last race of the season.

In May 2012, Danielsson Motorsport announced that they would be shutting down their race team. This allowed Danielsson to put full focus on his own racing career.

In 2013, Danielsson competed in the Swedish V8 Thundercar Series, and in March he attempted to make his NASCAR debut in NASCAR K&N Pro Series East at Bristol Motor Speedway, but he failed to qualify. So in August, Danielsson made his NASCAR debut in America, driving No. 73 Chevrolet Camaro for Creation-Cope Racing in the Nationwide Series at the Mid-Ohio Sports Car Course.

Danielsson also competed in the ARCA Racing Series between 2014 and 2016.

Danielsson has also driven monster trucks in Monster Jam. In 2017, he won his first Racing and Freestyle title.

== Formula 1 ==
As a prize for winning the 2006 World Series by Renault, Danielsson was given a Formula 1 test. On 18 May 2007, he drove the 2006 Renault R26 on the Stowe configuration of the Silverstone circuit. He did 50 laps on the 31 sec configuration. A few months later in August, he did demo runs with the same car at the Race Salon in Rotterdam.

== Motorsports career results ==
=== Formula Renault 3.5 Series ===
(key) (Races in bold indicate pole position) (Races in italics indicate fastest lap)

Formula Renault 3.5 Series results
| Year | Entrant | 1 | 2 | 3 | 4 | 5 | 6 | 7 | 8 | 9 | 10 | 11 | 12 | 13 | 14 | 15 | 16 | 17 | DC | Points |
|---|---|---|---|---|---|---|---|---|---|---|---|---|---|---|---|---|---|---|---|---|
| 2005 | DAMS | ZOL; 1 DNS | ZOL; 2 DNS | MON; 1 | VAL; 1; 8 | VAL; 2 Ret | LMS; 1 DNS | LMS; 2; 14 | BIL; 1; 8 | BIL; 2; 2 | OSC; 1; 4 | OSC; 2 Ret | DON; 1; 7 | DON; 2; 9 | EST; 1 | EST; 2 | MNZ; 1 | MNZ; 2 | 15th | 32 |
| 2006 | Comtec Racing | ZOL; 1; 4 | ZOL; 2; 10 | MON; 1 Ret | IST; 1; 6 | IST; 2 Ret | MIS; 1; 6 | MIS; 2; 7 | SPA; 1 Ret | SPA; 2 Ret | NUR; 1; 5 | NUR; 2; 2 | DON; 1; 1 | DON; 2; 1 | **LMS**; **1**; 1 | LMS; 2 NC | CAT; 1; 1 | CAT; 2; 5 | **1st** | **112** |

=== NASCAR ===
(key) (Bold – Pole position awarded by qualifying time. Italics – Pole position earned by points standings or practice time. * – Most laps led.)

==== Nationwide Series ====
NASCAR Nationwide Series results
| Year | Team | No. | Make | 1 | 2 | 3 | 4 | 5 | 6 | 7 | 8 | 9 | 10 | 11 | 12 | 13 | 14 | 15 | 16 | 17 | 18 | 19 | 20 | 21 | 22 | 23 | 24 | 25 | 26 | 27 | 28 | 29 | 30 | 31 | 32 | 33 | NNSC | Pts | Ref |
|---|---|---|---|---|---|---|---|---|---|---|---|---|---|---|---|---|---|---|---|---|---|---|---|---|---|---|---|---|---|---|---|---|---|---|---|---|---|---|---|
| 2013 | Creation-Cope Racing | 73 | Chevy | DAY | PHO | LVS | BRI | CAL | TEX | RCH | TAL | DAR | CLT | DOV | IOW | MCH | ROA | KEN | DAY | NHA | CHI | IND | IOW | GLN | MOH; 37 | BRI | ATL | RCH | CHI | KEN | DOV | KAN | CLT | TEX | PHO | HOM | 86th | 7 | |

=== ARCA Racing Series ===
(key) (Bold – Pole position awarded by qualifying time. Italics – Pole position earned by points standings or practice time. * – Most laps led.)

ARCA Racing Series results
| Year | Team | No. | Make | 1 | 2 | 3 | 4 | 5 | 6 | 7 | 8 | 9 | 10 | 11 | 12 | 13 | 14 | 15 | 16 | 17 | 18 | 19 | 20 | ARSC | Pts | Ref |
|---|---|---|---|---|---|---|---|---|---|---|---|---|---|---|---|---|---|---|---|---|---|---|---|---|---|---|
| 2014 | Carter 2 Motorsports | 40 | Dodge | DAY; 21 | MOB | SLM | TAL | TOL | NJM | POC | MCH | ELK | WIN | CHI | IRP | POC | BLN | ISF | MAD | DSF | SLM | KEN | KAN | 117th | 125 | |
| 2016 | Carter 2 Motorsports | 97 | Ford | DAY; Wth | | | | | | | | | | | | | | | | | | | | 121st | 125 | |
| 2016 | Wayne Peterson Racing | 06 | Dodge | | NSH; 21 | SLM | TAL | TOL | NJM | POC | MCH | MAD | WIN | IOW | IRP | POC | BLN | ISF | DSF | SLM | CHI | KEN | KAN | 121st | 125 | |

=== FIA World Rallycross Championship results ===
==== Supercar ====
| Year | Entrant | Car | 1 | 2 | 3 | 4 | 5 | 6 | 7 | 8 | 9 | 10 | 11 | 12 | 13 | Position | Points |
|---|---|---|---|---|---|---|---|---|---|---|---|---|---|---|---|---|---|
| 2015 | All-Inkl.com Münnich Motorsport | Audi S3 | POR; 21 | HOC; 16 | BEL; 18 | GBR; 29 | GER; 16 | SWE; 20 | CAN | NOR; 4 | FRA; 15 | BAR; 17 | TUR; 19 | ITA | ARG | 21st | 17 |

Sporting positions
| Preceded by Robert Kubica | Formula Renault 3.5 Series; Champion; 2006 | Succeeded by Álvaro Parente |
