= EPIC Racing =

Racing team

(Spain) EPIC Racing
- Founded: 1999
- Folded: 2011
- Team principal(s): Joan Villadelprat
- Former series: Le Mans Series; Formula Renault 2.0 West European Cup; World Series by Renault; Eurocup Formula Renault 2.0
- Teams' Championships: 2005 World Series by Renault; 2006 Formula Renault 2.0 Italia Winter Series; 2007 Eurocup Formula Renault 2.0; 2009 Formula Renault 2.0 West European Cup
- Drivers' Championships: 2005 World Series by Renault (Kubica); 2006 Formula Renault 2.0 Italia Winter Series (Alguersuari); 2007 Eurocup Formula Renault 2.0 (Hartley); 2009 Eurocup Formula Renault 2.0 (Costa); 2009 Formula Renault 2.0 West European Cup (Costa)

EPIC Racing (Euskadi Phil Imanol Claudio Racing), formerly known as Epsilon Euskadi, was a racing team from Spain. The team's headquarters were located in Vitoria within Basque Country. Epsilon Euskadi ran teams within World Series by Renault and Formula Renault before selling the racing division to EPIC Racing in March 2011 in a bid to run the World Series by Renault with both Formula Renault 3.5 and Formula Renault 2.0.

In 2008 Epsilon Euskadi participated in sports car racing with the Epsilon Euskadi ee1 car.

== Bid for Formula One ==
Although the team announced on 3 June 2009 that it had submitted an entry for the Formula 1 World Championship for 2010, the FIA did not list them amongst the 13 teams in the preliminary entry list released on 12 June 2009. They were however placed on the reserve list in case one of the 13 teams withdrew, but the withdrawal of USF1 took place too late for this contingency to operate.

In March 2010 Epsilon Euskadi announced it applied to enter the 2011 Formula One championship, following the failure of US F1 to use the entry they had been granted. This application was also unsuccessful.

== Corruption ==
Epsilon Euskadi sponsored EPIC Racing with public funding of the Basque Country government.

In 2013 Epsilon Euskadi founder Joan Villadelprat and Mark Phillip Payne were taken to court in Vitoria under allegations of corruption. They were also alleged to have mismanaged public funds granted by the Basque Country government during the presidency of Juan Jose Ibarratxe.

== Results ==
=== World Series by Renault ===
(Note: 2011 results are for EPIC Racing)

World Series by Renault results
Year	Car	Drivers	Races	Wins	Poles	FLaps	Points	D.C.	T.C.
2005	Dallara T05-Renault	(Spain) Félix Porteiro	17	3	4	1	77	5th	1st
2005	Dallara T05-Renault	(Poland) Robert Kubica	17	4	2	1	154	1st	1st
2006	Dallara T05-Renault	(United Kingdom) Steven Kane	17	0	0	1	15	20th	10th
2006	Dallara T05-Renault	(Italy) Davide Valsecchi	17	0	1	0	43	10th	10th
2007	Dallara T05-Renault	(Portugal) Filipe Albuquerque	17	1	0	1	81	4th	4th
2007	Dallara T05-Renault	(Italy) Davide Valsecchi	17	1	0	0	37	16th	4th
2008	Dallara T08-Renault	(France) Alexandre Marsoin	17	0	0	0	19	19th	10th
2008	Dallara T08-Renault	(Portugal) Filipe Albuquerque	4	0	0	0	12	21st	10th
2008	Dallara T08-Renault	(Brazil) Mario Romancini	13	0	0	0	3	29th	10th
2009	Dallara T08-Renault	(Spain) Adrián Vallés	8	0	1	0	19	17th	8th
2009	Dallara T08-Renault	(Spain) Dani Clos	4	0	0	0	5	25th	8th
2009	Dallara T08-Renault	(Japan) Keisuke Kunimoto	4	0	0	0	0	NC	8th
2009	Dallara T08-Renault	(New Zealand) Chris van der Drift	17	0	0	0	41	11th	8th
2010	Dallara T08-Renault	(Spain) Albert Costa	17	0	0	0	78	5th	6th
2010	Dallara T08-Renault	(Japan) Keisuke Kunimoto	17	0	0	0	8	22nd	6th
2011	Dallara T08-Renault	(Estonia) Sten Pentus	17	0	0	0	11	24th	4th
2011	Dallara T08-Renault	(Spain) Albert Costa	17	1	1	1	151	4th	4th

- D.C. = Drivers' Championship position, T.C. = Teams' Championship position.

=== 24 Hours of Le Mans results ===
24 Hours of Le Mans results
Year	Class	No	Tyres	Car	Drivers	Pole	Fast lap	Laps	Pos.	Class Pos.
2008	LMP1	20	M	Epsilon Euskadi ee1 Judd GV5.5 S2 5.5L V10	(Spain) Ángel Burgueño (Spain) Miguel Ángel de Castro (Spain) Adrián Vallés	no	no	189 (DNF)	41st	17th
2008	LMP1	21	M	Epsilon Euskadi ee1 Judd GV5.5 S2 5.5L V10	(Japan) Shinji Nakano (Sweden) Stefan Johansson (France) Jean-Marc Gounon	no	no	158 (DNF)	43rd	19th
