= Circuito Urbano Bilbao =

Street circuit in Bilbao, Spain

Circuito urbano de Bilbao
- Full Circuit (2005)
- Location: Bilbao, País Vasco, Spain
- Coordinates: 43°16′05″N 02°56′40″W
- Opened: 15 July 2005; 20 years ago
- Closed: 17 July 2005; 20 years ago
- Major events: World Series by Renault (2005)

Full Circuit (2005)
- Length: 4.037 km (2.508 mi)
- Turns: 24
- Race lap record: 1:48.244 ( (Austria) Andreas Zuber, Dallara T05, 2005, FR 3.5)

The Circuito Urbano Bilbao was a 4.037 km (2.508 mi) street circuit in Bilbao, Spain. It was used only once in 15–17 July 2005 for an event of the Formula Renault 3.5 Series, Eurocup Formula Renault 2.0 and Eurocup Mégane Trophy championships.

== Winners ==
| Year | Race | Formula Renault 3.5 Series | Eurocup Formula Renault 2.0 | Eurocup Mégane Trophy |
|---|---|---|---|---|
| 2005 | First | (Poland) Robert Kubica | (Germany) Michael Ammermüller | (Belgium) Jan Heylen |
| 2005 | Second | (Australia) Will Power | (South Africa) Adrian Zaugg | (Belgium) Jan Heylen |

== Lap records ==
The fastest official lap records at the Circuito Urbano Bilbao are listed as:

| Category | Time | Driver | Vehicle | Event |
Full Circuit (2005): 4.037 km (2.508 mi)
| Formula Renault 3.5 | 1:48.244 | Andreas Zuber | Dallara T05 | 2005 Bilbao Formula Renault 3.5 Series round |
| Formula Renault 2.0 | 1:59.502 | Junior Strous | Tatuus FR2000 | 2005 Bilbao Eurocup Formula Renault 2.0 round |
