= 2007 World Series by Renault =

Seasons
- ← 2006 2008 →

The 2007 World Series by Renault was the third season of Renault Sport's series of events, with three different championships racing under one banner.

== Race calendar ==
Circuit	Date	Series
(Italy) Autodromo Nazionale Monza	14 April	FR3.5
(Italy) Autodromo Nazionale Monza	15 April	FR3.5
(Belgium) Zolder	21 April	EFR2.0 + EMT
(Belgium) Zolder	22 April	EFR2.0 + EMT
(Germany) Nürburgring	5 May	All
(Germany) Nürburgring	6 May	All
Circuit de Monaco	27 May	FR3.5
(Hungary) Hungaroring	14 July	All
(Hungary) Hungaroring	15 July	All
(Belgium) Circuit de Spa-Francorchamps	18 August	FR3.5
(Belgium) Circuit de Spa-Francorchamps	19 August	FR3.5
(United Kingdom) Donington Park	8 September	All
(United Kingdom) Donington Park	9 September	All
(France) Circuit de Nevers Magny-Cours	22 September	All
(France) Circuit de Nevers Magny-Cours	23 September	All
(Portugal) Autódromo do Estoril	20 October	All
(Portugal) Autódromo do Estoril	21 October	All
(Spain) Circuit de Catalunya	27 October	All
(Spain) Circuit de Catalunya	28 October	All

- Event in light blue is not part of the World Series, but is a championship round for the Formula Renault 3.5 Series.

== Championships ==
=== Formula Renault 3.5 Series ===
Pos.	Driver	Team	Points
1	(Portugal) Álvaro Parente	(France) Tech 1 Racing	129
2	(United Kingdom) Ben Hanley	(Italy) Prema Powerteam	102
3	(Serbia) Miloš Pavlović	(Italy) International DracoRacing	96
4	(Portugal) Filipe Albuquerque	(Spain) Epsilon Euskadi	81
5	(Germany) Sebastian Vettel	(United Kingdom) Carlin Motorsport	74

=== Eurocup Formula Renault 2.0 ===
Pos.	Driver	Team	Points
1	(New Zealand) Brendon Hartley	(Spain) Epsilon RedBull	134
2	(United Kingdom) Jon Lancaster	(France) SG Formula	102
3	(France) Charles Pic	(France) SG Formula	88
4	(Monaco) Stefano Coletti	(Spain) Epsilon Euskadi	71
5	(Germany) Frank Kechele	(Germany) Motorsport Arena	67

=== Eurocup Mégane Trophy ===
Pos.	Driver	Team	Points
1	(Portugal) Pedro Petiz	(France) Tech 1 Racing	146
2	(France) Dimitri Enjalbert	(France) Tech 1 Racing	126
3	(Belgium) Maxime Martin	(Belgium) Boutsen Energy Racing	85
4	(Switzerland) Ralph Meichtry	(Switzerland) Race Performance	80
5	(France) Matthieu Lahaye	(France) Tech 1 Racing	69
