= 2005 World Series by Renault =

Seasons
- ← 2004 (Nissan) 2006 →

The 2005 World Series by Renault- was the first season of Renault Sport's series of events, with three different championships racing under one banner.

== Race calendar ==
Circuit	Date	Series
(Belgium) Zolder	30 April	All
(Belgium) Zolder	1 May	All
Circuit de Monaco	22 May	FR3.5
(Spain) Circuito Ricardo Tormo	3 June	All + Clio Cup Spain
(Spain) Circuito Ricardo Tormo	4 June	All + Clio Cup Spain
(France) Bugatti Circuit	10 July	All
(France) Bugatti Circuit	11 July	All
(Spain) Circuito urbano de Bilbao	16 July	All + Clio Cup Spain
(Spain) Circuito urbano de Bilbao	17 July	All + Clio Cup Spain
(Germany) Motorsport Arena Oschersleben	7 August	All
(Germany) Motorsport Arena Oschersleben	8 August	All
(United Kingdom) Donington Park	10 September	All
(United Kingdom) Donington Park	11 September	All
(Portugal) Autódromo do Estoril	1 October	All
(Portugal) Autódromo do Estoril	2 October	All
(Italy) Autodromo Nazionale di Monza	22 October	All
(Italy) Autodromo Nazionale di Monza	23 October	All

- Event in light blue is not part of the World Series, but is a championship round for the Formula Renault 3.5 Series.

== Championships ==
=== Formula Renault 3.5 Series ===
Pos.	Driver	Team	Points
1	(Poland) Robert Kubica	(Spain) Epsilon Euskadi	154
2	(Spain) Adrián Vallés	(Spain) Pons Racing	116
3	(Germany) Markus Winkelhock	(Italy) Draco Multiracing USA	114
4	(France) Tristan Gommendy	(Belgium) Witmeur KTR	96
5	(Spain) Félix Porteiro	(Spain) Epsilon Euskadi	77

=== Eurocup Formula Renault 2.0 ===
Pos.	Driver	Team	Points
1	(Japan) Kamui Kobayashi	(Italy) Prema Powerteam	157
2	(Germany) Michael Ammermüller	(Switzerland) Jenzer Motorsport	149
3	(France) Yann Clairay	(France) SG Formula	125
4	(Netherlands) Carlo van Dam	(France) SG Formula	100
5	(Portugal) Filipe Albuquerque	(Germany) Motopark Academy	63

=== Eurocup Mégane Trophy ===
Pos.	Driver	Team	Points
1	(Belgium) Jan Heylen	Racing for Belgium	147
2	(France) Renaud Derlot	(France) TP Compétition	134
3	(France) Ludovic Badey	(France) Pouchelon Racing	108
4	(Belgium) Jeffrey van Hooydonk	(Belgium) Thierry Boutsen Racing	89
5	(Portugal) César Campaniço	Racing for Belgium	85
