= 2012 World Series by Renault =

Seasons
- ← 2011 2013 →

The 2012 World Series by Renault was the eighth season of Renault Sport's series of events, with four different championships racing under one banner. Consisting of the Formula Renault 3.5 Series, Eurocup Formula Renault 2.0, the Eurocup Mégane Trophy and Eurocup Clio, the World Series by Renault ran at seven different venues, where fans could get into the meetings for no cost whatsoever, such is the uniqueness of the series.

The series began on 5 Nay at the Ciudad del Motor de Aragón in Alcañiz, and finished on 21 October at the Circuit de Catalunya, just outside Barcelona. Round at Monza was dropped. While brand new Moscow Raceway was included in series' schedule, while Formula Renault 3.5 had two extra races on its own, in support of the Monaco Grand Prix and 6 Hours of Silverstone.

== Race calendar ==
- Event in light blue is not part of the World Series, but is a championship round for the Formula Renault 3.5 Series.

Circuit	Location	Date	Series	Winning driver	Winning team
(Spain) Ciudad del Motor de Aragón	Alcañiz, Spain	5 May	FR3.5 1	(United Kingdom) Nick Yelloly	(United Kingdom) Comtec Racing
(Spain) Ciudad del Motor de Aragón	Alcañiz, Spain	5 May	FR2.0 1	(Russia) Daniil Kvyat	(Finland) Koiranen Motorsport
(Spain) Ciudad del Motor de Aragón	Alcañiz, Spain	5 May	EMT 1	(Netherlands) Bas Schothorst	(France) TDS Racing
(Spain) Ciudad del Motor de Aragón	Alcañiz, Spain	6 May	FR3.5 2	(Netherlands) Robin Frijns	(United Kingdom) Fortec Motorsports
(Spain) Ciudad del Motor de Aragón	Alcañiz, Spain	6 May	FR2.0 2	(Russia) Daniil Kvyat	(Finland) Koiranen Motorsport
(Spain) Ciudad del Motor de Aragón	Alcañiz, Spain	6 May	EMT 2	(Netherlands) Bas Schothorst	(France) TDS Racing
Circuit de Monaco	Monte Carlo, Monaco	27 May	FR3.5 3	(United Kingdom) Sam Bird	(Czech Republic) ISR
(Belgium) Circuit de Spa-Francorchamps	Spa, Belgium	2 June	FR3.5 4	(Denmark) Marco Sørensen	(Czech Republic) Lotus
(Belgium) Circuit de Spa-Francorchamps	Spa, Belgium	2 June	FR2.0 3	(France) Norman Nato	(Luxembourg) RC Formula
(Belgium) Circuit de Spa-Francorchamps	Spa, Belgium	2 June	EMT 3	(Netherlands) Bas Schothorst	(France) TDS Racing
(Belgium) Circuit de Spa-Francorchamps	Spa, Belgium	2 June	EC 1	(France) Marc Guillot	(France) Milan Competition
(Belgium) Circuit de Spa-Francorchamps	Spa, Belgium	3 June	FR3.5 5	(Denmark) Kevin Magnussen	(United Kingdom) Carlin
(Belgium) Circuit de Spa-Francorchamps	Spa, Belgium	3 June	FR2.0 4	(Russia) Daniil Kvyat	(Finland) Koiranen Motorsport
(Belgium) Circuit de Spa-Francorchamps	Spa, Belgium	3 June	EMT 4	(Netherlands) Bas Schothorst	(France) TDS Racing
(Belgium) Circuit de Spa-Francorchamps	Spa, Belgium	3 June	EC 2	(Netherlands) Mike Verschuur	(Netherlands) Equipe Verschuur
(Germany) Nürburgring	Nürburg, Germany	30 June	FR3.5 6	(France) Jules Bianchi	(France) Tech 1 Racing
(Germany) Nürburgring	Nürburg, Germany	30 June	FR2.0 5	(Belgium) Stoffel Vandoorne	(Germany) Josef Kaufmann Racing
(Germany) Nürburgring	Nürburg, Germany	30 June	EMT 5	(Spain) Albert Costa	(Italy) Oregon Team
(Germany) Nürburgring	Nürburg, Germany	30 June	EC 3	(Spain) Oscar Nogués	(Italy) Rangoni Motorsport
(Germany) Nürburgring	Nürburg, Germany	1 July	FR3.5 7	(United Kingdom) Nick Yelloly	(United Kingdom) Comtec Racing
(Germany) Nürburgring	Nürburg, Germany	1 July	FR2.0 6	(Belgium) Stoffel Vandoorne	(Germany) Josef Kaufmann Racing
(Germany) Nürburgring	Nürburg, Germany	1 July	EMT 6	(Netherlands) Bas Schothorst	(France) TDS Racing
(Germany) Nürburgring	Nürburg, Germany	1 July	EC 4	(France) Marc Guillot	(France) Milan Competition
(Russia) Moscow Raceway	Volokolamsk, Russia	14 July	FR3.5 8	(Netherlands) Robin Frijns	(United Kingdom) Fortec Motorsports
(Russia) Moscow Raceway	Volokolamsk, Russia	14 July	FR2.0 7	(Russia) Daniil Kvyat	(Finland) Koiranen Motorsport
(Russia) Moscow Raceway	Volokolamsk, Russia	14 July	EMT 7	(Switzerland) Fabien Thuner	(Italy) Oregon Team
(Russia) Moscow Raceway	Volokolamsk, Russia	15 July	FR3.5 9	(France) Arthur Pic	(France) DAMS
(Russia) Moscow Raceway	Volokolamsk, Russia	15 July	FR2.0 8	(Russia) Daniil Kvyat	(Finland) Koiranen Motorsport
(Russia) Moscow Raceway	Volokolamsk, Russia	15 July	EMT 8	(Spain) Albert Costa	(Italy) Oregon Team
(United Kingdom) Silverstone Circuit	Silverstone, United Kingdom	25 August	FR3.5 10	(France) Jules Bianchi	(France) Tech 1 Racing
(United Kingdom) Silverstone Circuit	Silverstone, United Kingdom	26 August	FR3.5 11	(United Kingdom) Sam Bird	(Czech Republic) ISR
(Hungary) Hungaroring	Mogyoród, Hungary	15 September	FR3.5 12	(Netherlands) Robin Frijns	(United Kingdom) Fortec Motorsports
(Hungary) Hungaroring	Mogyoród, Hungary	15 September	FR2.0 9	(Belgium) Stoffel Vandoorne	(Germany) Josef Kaufmann Racing
(Hungary) Hungaroring	Mogyoród, Hungary	15 September	EMT 9	(Spain) Albert Costa	(Italy) Oregon Team
(Hungary) Hungaroring	Mogyoród, Hungary	16 September	FR3.5 13	(Portugal) António Félix da Costa	(United Kingdom) Arden Caterham
(Hungary) Hungaroring	Mogyoród, Hungary	16 September	FR2.0 10	(Russia) Daniil Kvyat	(Finland) Koiranen Motorsport
(Hungary) Hungaroring	Mogyoród, Hungary	16 September	EMT 10	(Spain) Albert Costa	(Italy) Oregon Team
(France) Circuit Paul Ricard	Le Castellet, France	29 September	FR3.5 14	(Portugal) António Félix da Costa	(United Kingdom) Arden Caterham
(France) Circuit Paul Ricard	Le Castellet, France	29 September	FR2.0 11	(Belgium) Stoffel Vandoorne	(Germany) Josef Kaufmann Racing
(France) Circuit Paul Ricard	Le Castellet, France	29 September	EMT 11	(Spain) Albert Costa	(Italy) Oregon Team
(France) Circuit Paul Ricard	Le Castellet, France	29 September	EC 5	(Spain) Oscar Nogués	(Italy) Rangoni Motorsport
(France) Circuit Paul Ricard	Le Castellet, France	30 September	FR3.5 15	(France) Jules Bianchi	(France) Tech 1 Racing
(France) Circuit Paul Ricard	Le Castellet, France	30 September	FR2.0 12	(Russia) Daniil Kvyat	(Finland) Koiranen Motorsport
(France) Circuit Paul Ricard	Le Castellet, France	30 September	EMT 12	(Spain) Albert Costa	(Italy) Oregon Team
(France) Circuit Paul Ricard	Le Castellet, France	30 September	EC 6	(Netherlands) Mike Verschuur	(Netherlands) Equipe Verschuur
(Spain) Circuit de Catalunya	Montmeló, Spain	20 October	FR3.5 16	(Portugal) António Félix da Costa	(United Kingdom) Arden Caterham
(Spain) Circuit de Catalunya	Montmeló, Spain	20 October	FR2.0 13	(Colombia) Óscar Tunjo	(France) Tech 1 Racing
(Spain) Circuit de Catalunya	Montmeló, Spain	20 October	EMT 13	(Netherlands) Bas Schothorst	(France) TDS Racing
(Spain) Circuit de Catalunya	Montmeló, Spain	20 October	EC 7	(Spain) Oscar Nogués	(Italy) Rangoni Motorsport
(Spain) Circuit de Catalunya	Montmeló, Spain	21 October	FR3.5 17	(Portugal) António Félix da Costa	(United Kingdom) Arden Caterham
(Spain) Circuit de Catalunya	Montmeló, Spain	21 October	FR2.0 14	(United Kingdom) Oliver Rowland	(United Kingdom) Fortec Motorsports
(Spain) Circuit de Catalunya	Montmeló, Spain	21 October	EMT 14	(Spain) Albert Costa	(Italy) Oregon Team
(Spain) Circuit de Catalunya	Montmeló, Spain	21 October	EC 8	(Italy) Christian Ricciarini	(Italy) Composit Motorsport

Icon	Championship
FR3.5	Formula Renault 3.5 Series
FR2.0	Eurocup Formula Renault 2.0
EMT	Eurocup Mégane Trophy
EC	Eurocup Clio

== Championships ==
=== Formula Renault 3.5 Series ===
Pos.	Driver	Team	Points
1	(Netherlands) Robin Frijns	(United Kingdom) Fortec Motorsports	189
2	(France) Jules Bianchi	(France) Tech 1 Racing	185
3	(United Kingdom) Sam Bird	(Czech Republic) ISR	179
4	(Portugal) António Félix da Costa	(United Kingdom) Arden Caterham	166
5	(United Kingdom) Nick Yelloly	(United Kingdom) Comtec Racing	122

=== Eurocup Formula Renault 2.0 ===
Pos.	Driver	Team	Points
1	(Belgium) Stoffel Vandoorne	(Germany) Josef Kaufmann Racing	244
2	(Russia) Daniil Kvyat	(Finland) Koiranen Motorsport	234
3	(United Kingdom) Oliver Rowland	(United Kingdom) Fortec Motorsports	109
4	(France) Norman Nato	(Luxembourg) RC Formula	96
5	(Netherlands) Nyck de Vries	(France) R-ace GP	78

=== Eurocup Mégane Trophy ===
Pos.	Driver	Team	Points
1	(Spain) Albert Costa	(Italy) Oregon Team	251
2	(Netherlands) Bas Schothorst	(France) TDS Racing	247
3	(Italy) Kevin Gilardoni	(Italy) Oregon Team	160
4	(Italy) Niccolò Nalio	(Italy) Oregon Team	153
5	(Switzerland) Fabien Thuner	(Italy) Oregon Team	131

=== Eurocup Clio ===
Pos.	Driver	Team	Points
1	(Spain) Oscar Nogués	(Italy) Rangoni Motorsport	115
2	(France) Marc Guillot	(France) Milan Competition	106
3	(Netherlands) Mike Verschuur	(Netherlands) Equipe Verschuur	91
4	(Spain) Rafael Villanueva	(France) Milan Competition	80
5	(Italy) Christian Ricciarini	(Italy) Composit Motorsport	66
