= 2011 World Series by Renault =

Seasons
- ← 2010 2012 →

The 2011 World Series by Renault was the seventh season of Renault Sport's series of events, with four different championships racing under one banner. Consisting of the Formula Renault 3.5 Series, Eurocup Formula Renault 2.0, the Eurocup Mégane Trophy and Eurocup Clio, the World Series by Renault ran at seven different venues, where fans could get into the meetings for no cost whatsoever, such is the uniqueness of the series.

The series began on 16 April at the Ciudad del Motor de Aragón in Alcañiz, and finished on 9 October at the Circuit de Catalunya, just outside Barcelona. Rounds at Brno, Magny-Cours and Hockenheim were dropped. While Nürburgring and Circuit Paul Ricard were included in series' schedule, while Formula Renault 3.5 had two extra races on its own, in support of the Monaco Grand Prix and FIA WTCC Race of Italy. The Eurocup Clio – replaced Eurocup F4 1.6 in World Series by Renault programme.

== Race calendar ==
- Event in light blue is not part of the World Series, but is a championship round for the Formula Renault 3.5 Series.

Circuit	Location	Date	Series	Winning driver	Winning team
(Spain) Ciudad del Motor de Aragón	Alcañiz, Spain	16 April	FR3.5 1	(United States) Alexander Rossi	(United Kingdom) Fortec Motorsports
(Spain) Ciudad del Motor de Aragón	Alcañiz, Spain	16 April	FR2.0 1	(Spain) Carlos Sainz Jr.	(Finland) Koiranen Motorsport
(Spain) Ciudad del Motor de Aragón	Alcañiz, Spain	16 April	EMT 1	(Switzerland) Stefano Comini	(Italy) Oregon Team
(Spain) Ciudad del Motor de Aragón	Alcañiz, Spain	17 April	FR3.5 2	(Estonia) Kevin Korjus	(France) Tech 1 Racing
(Spain) Ciudad del Motor de Aragón	Alcañiz, Spain	17 April	FR2.0 2	(United Kingdom) Will Stevens	(United Kingdom) Fortec Motorsport
(Spain) Ciudad del Motor de Aragón	Alcañiz, Spain	17 April	EMT 2	(Switzerland) Stefano Comini	(Italy) Oregon Team
(Belgium) Circuit de Spa-Francorchamps	Spa, Belgium	30 April	FR3.5 3	(Canada) Robert Wickens	(United Kingdom) Carlin
(Belgium) Circuit de Spa-Francorchamps	Spa, Belgium	30 April	FR2.0 3	(Spain) Carlos Sainz Jr.	(Finland) Koiranen Motorsport
(Belgium) Circuit de Spa-Francorchamps	Spa, Belgium	30 April	EMT 3	(Switzerland) Stefano Comini	(Italy) Oregon Team
(Belgium) Circuit de Spa-Francorchamps	Spa, Belgium	30 April	EC 1	(France) Nicolas Milan	(France) Milan Competition
(Belgium) Circuit de Spa-Francorchamps	Spa, Belgium	1 May	FR3.5 4	(France) Jean-Éric Vergne	(United Kingdom) Carlin
(Belgium) Circuit de Spa-Francorchamps	Spa, Belgium	1 May	FR2.0 4	(Russia) Daniil Kvyat	(Finland) Koiranen Motorsport
(Belgium) Circuit de Spa-Francorchamps	Spa, Belgium	1 May	EMT 4	(Switzerland) Stefano Comini	(Italy) Oregon Team
(Belgium) Circuit de Spa-Francorchamps	Spa, Belgium	1 May	EC 2	(France) Nicolas Milan	(France) Milan Competition
(Italy) Autodromo Nazionale Monza	Monza, Italy	14 May	FR3.5 5	(Estonia) Kevin Korjus	(France) Tech 1 Racing
(Italy) Autodromo Nazionale Monza	Monza, Italy	15 May	FR3.5 6	(France) Jean-Éric Vergne	(United Kingdom) Carlin
Circuit de Monaco	Monte Carlo, Monaco	29 May	FR3.5 7	(Australia) Daniel Ricciardo	(Czech Republic) ISR
(Germany) Nürburgring	Nürburg, Germany	18 June	FR3.5 8	(Canada) Robert Wickens	(United Kingdom) Carlin
(Germany) Nürburgring	Nürburg, Germany	18 June	FR2.0 5	(Netherlands) Robin Frijns	(Germany) Josef Kaufmann Racing
(Germany) Nürburgring	Nürburg, Germany	18 June	EMT 5	(Switzerland) Stefano Comini	(Italy) Oregon Team
(Germany) Nürburgring	Nürburg, Germany	18 June	EC 3	(France) Nicolas Milan	(France) Milan Competition
(Germany) Nürburgring	Nürburg, Germany	19 June	FR3.5 9	(Estonia) Kevin Korjus	(France) Tech 1 Racing
(Germany) Nürburgring	Nürburg, Germany	19 June	FR2.0 6	(Russia) Daniil Kvyat	(Finland) Koiranen Motorsport
(Germany) Nürburgring	Nürburg, Germany	19 June	EMT 6	(Switzerland) Stefano Comini	(Italy) Oregon Team
(Germany) Nürburgring	Nürburg, Germany	19 June	EC 4	(Netherlands) Mike Verschuur	(Netherlands) Equipe Verschuur
(Hungary) Hungaroring	Mogyoród, Hungary	2 July	FR3.5 10	(France) Jean-Éric Vergne	(United Kingdom) Carlin
(Hungary) Hungaroring	Mogyoród, Hungary	2 July	FR2.0 7	(Netherlands) Robin Frijns	(Germany) Josef Kaufmann Racing
(Hungary) Hungaroring	Mogyoród, Hungary	2 July	EMT 7	(Italy) Niccolò Nalio	(Italy) Oregon Racing
(Hungary) Hungaroring	Mogyoród, Hungary	3 July	FR3.5 11	(France) Jean-Éric Vergne	(United Kingdom) Carlin
(Hungary) Hungaroring	Mogyoród, Hungary	3 July	FR2.0 8	(Sweden) Timmy Hansen	(Austria) Interwetten Junior Team
(Hungary) Hungaroring	Mogyoród, Hungary	3 July	EMT 8	(Switzerland) Stefano Comini	(Italy) Oregon Team
(United Kingdom) Silverstone Circuit	Silverstone, United Kingdom	20 August	FR3.5 12	(Canada) Robert Wickens	(United Kingdom) Carlin
(United Kingdom) Silverstone Circuit	Silverstone, United Kingdom	20 August	FR2.0 9	(Netherlands) Robin Frijns	(Germany) Josef Kaufmann Racing
(United Kingdom) Silverstone Circuit	Silverstone, United Kingdom	20 August	EMT 9	(Switzerland) Stefano Comini	(Italy) Oregon Team
(United Kingdom) Silverstone Circuit	Silverstone, United Kingdom	21 August	FR3.5 13	(Canada) Robert Wickens	(United Kingdom) Carlin
(United Kingdom) Silverstone Circuit	Silverstone, United Kingdom	21 August	FR2.0 10	(Netherlands) Robin Frijns	(Germany) Josef Kaufmann Racing
(United Kingdom) Silverstone Circuit	Silverstone, United Kingdom	21 August	EMT 10	(Switzerland) Stefano Comini	(Italy) Oregon Team
(France) Circuit Paul Ricard	Le Castellet, France	17 September	FR3.5 14	(France) Jean-Éric Vergne	(United Kingdom) Carlin
(France) Circuit Paul Ricard	Le Castellet, France	17 September	FR2.0 11	(France) Paul-Loup Chatin	(France) Tech 1 Racing
(France) Circuit Paul Ricard	Le Castellet, France	17 September	EMT 11	(Netherlands) Bas Schothorst	(France) TDS Racing
(France) Circuit Paul Ricard	Le Castellet, France	17 September	EC 5	(Italy) Massimiliano Pedalà	(Italy) Rangoni Motorsport
(France) Circuit Paul Ricard	Le Castellet, France	18 September	FR3.5 15	(United States) Alexander Rossi	(United Kingdom) Fortec Motorsports
(France) Circuit Paul Ricard	Le Castellet, France	18 September	FR2.0 12	(Netherlands) Robin Frijns	(Germany) Josef Kaufmann Racing
(France) Circuit Paul Ricard	Le Castellet, France	18 September	EMT 12	(Switzerland) Stefano Comini	(Italy) Oregon Team
(France) Circuit Paul Ricard	Le Castellet, France	18 September	EC 6	(France) Nicolas Milan	(France) Milan Competition
(Spain) Circuit de Catalunya	Montmeló, Spain	8 October	FR3.5 16	(Canada) Robert Wickens	(United Kingdom) Carlin
(Spain) Circuit de Catalunya	Montmeló, Spain	8 October	FR2.0 13	(Spain) Javier Tarancón	(France) Tech 1 Racing
(Spain) Circuit de Catalunya	Montmeló, Spain	8 October	EMT 13	(Switzerland) Stefano Comini	(Italy) Oregon Team
(Spain) Circuit de Catalunya	Montmeló, Spain	8 October	EC 7	(Spain) Azor Dueña	(France) Milan Competition
(Spain) Circuit de Catalunya	Montmeló, Spain	9 October	FR3.5 17	(Spain) Albert Costa	(Spain) EPIC Racing
(Spain) Circuit de Catalunya	Montmeló, Spain	9 October	FR2.0 14	(Spain) Alex Riberas	(Spain) EPIC Racing
(Spain) Circuit de Catalunya	Montmeló, Spain	9 October	EMT 14	(Italy) Niccolò Nalio	(Italy) Oregon Racing
(Spain) Circuit de Catalunya	Montmeló, Spain	9 October	EC 8	(France) Nicolas Milan	(France) Milan Competition

Icon	Championship
FR3.5	Formula Renault 3.5 Series
FR2.0	Eurocup Formula Renault 2.0
EMT	Eurocup Mégane Trophy
F4	F4 Eurocup 1.6

== Championships ==
=== Formula Renault 3.5 Series ===
Pos.	Driver	Team	Points
1	(Canada) Robert Wickens	(United Kingdom) Carlin	241
2	(France) Jean-Éric Vergne	(United Kingdom) Carlin	232
3	(United States) Alexander Rossi	(United Kingdom) Fortec Motorsports	156
4	(Spain) Albert Costa	(Spain) EPIC Racing	151
5	(Australia) Daniel Ricciardo	(Czech Republic) ISR Racing	144

=== Eurocup Formula Renault 2.0 ===
Pos.	Driver	Team	Points
1	(Netherlands) Robin Frijns	(Germany) Josef Kaufmann Racing	245
2	(Spain) Carlos Sainz Jr.	(Finland) Koiranen Motorsport	200
3	(Russia) Daniil Kvyat	(Finland) Koiranen Motorsport	155
4	(United Kingdom) Will Stevens	(United Kingdom) Fortec Motorsport	116
5	(Belgium) Stoffel Vandoorne	(Belgium) KTR	93

=== Eurocup Mégane Trophy ===
Pos.	Driver	Team	Points
1	(Switzerland) Stefano Comini	(Italy) Oregon Team	305
2	(Italy) Niccolò Nalio	(Italy) Oregon Team	188
3	(Netherlands) Bas Schothorst	(France) TDS Racing	149
4	(Belgium) David Dermont	(France) TDS Racing	135
5	(France) Grégory Guilvert	(France) Team Lompech Sport	97

=== Eurocup Clio ===
Pos.	Driver	Team	Points
1	(France) Nicolas Milan	(France) Milan Competition	186
2	(Netherlands) Mike Verschuur	(Netherlands) Equipe Verschuur	114
3	(Italy) Massimiliano Pedalà	(Italy) Rangoni Motorsport	63
4	(Italy) Simone Di Luca	(Italy) Rangoni Motorsport	62
5	(France) Marc Thomas Guillot	(France) Milan Competition	59
