= 2013 World Series by Renault =

Seasons
- ← 2012 2014 →

The 2013 World Series by Renault was the ninth season of Renault Sport's series of events, with four different championships racing under one banner. Consisting of the Formula Renault 3.5 Series, Eurocup Formula Renault 2.0, the Eurocup Mégane Trophy and Eurocup Clio, the World Series by Renault ran at seven different venues where fans could get into the meetings for no cost whatsoever, such is the uniqueness of the series.

The series began on 27 April at the Ciudad del Motor de Aragón in Alcañiz, and finished on 20 October at the Circuit de Barcelona-Catalunya, just outside Barcelona. Round Nürburgring dropped. While Red Bull Ring made its debut in the series' schedule, while Formula Renault 3.5 had two extra races on its own, in support of the Monaco Grand Prix and Monza Superstars Series round and Eurocup Clio had additional rounds in support of the Imola round of the Italian Clio Cup, and the Alcañiz round of the International Clio Cup.

== Race calendar ==
- Event in light blue is not part of the World Series, but is a championship round for the Formula Renault 3.5 Series.

| Circuit | Location | Date | Series | Winning driver | Winning team |
|---|---|---|---|---|---|
| (Italy) Autodromo Nazionale Monza | Monza, Italy | 6 April | FR3.5 1 | (Belgium) Stoffel Vandoorne | (United Kingdom) Fortec Motorsports |
| (Italy) Autodromo Nazionale Monza | Monza, Italy | 7 April | FR3.5 2 | (Portugal) António Félix da Costa | (United Kingdom) Arden Caterham |
| (Spain) Ciudad del Motor de Aragón | Alcañiz, Spain | 27 April | FR3.5 3 | (Denmark) Kevin Magnussen | (France) DAMS |
| (Spain) Ciudad del Motor de Aragón | Alcañiz, Spain | 27 April | FR2.0 1 | (France) Matthieu Vaxivière | (France) Tech 1 Racing |
| (Spain) Ciudad del Motor de Aragón | Alcañiz, Spain | 27 April | EMT 1 | (Italy) Mirko Bortolotti | (Italy) Oregon Team |
| (Spain) Ciudad del Motor de Aragón | Alcañiz, Spain | 28 April | FR3.5 4 | (Colombia) Carlos Huertas | (United Kingdom) Carlin |
| (Spain) Ciudad del Motor de Aragón | Alcañiz, Spain | 28 April | FR2.0 2 | (France) Matthieu Vaxivière | (France) Tech 1 Racing |
| (Spain) Ciudad del Motor de Aragón | Alcañiz, Spain | 28 April | EMT 2 | (Italy) Mirko Bortolotti | (Italy) Oregon Team |
| (Italy) Autodromo Enzo e Dino Ferrari | Imola, Italy | 11 May | EC 1 | (United Kingdom) Josh Files | (United Kingdom) Team Pyro |
| (Italy) Autodromo Enzo e Dino Ferrari | Imola, Italy | 12 May | EC 2 | (Italy) Massimiliano Pedalà | (Italy) Composit Motorsport |
| Circuit de Monaco | Monte Carlo, Monaco | 26 May | FR3.5 5 | (Switzerland) Nico Müller | (Italy) International Draco Racing |
| (Belgium) Circuit de Spa-Francorchamps | Spa, Belgium | 1 June | FR3.5 6 | (Denmark) Kevin Magnussen | (France) DAMS |
| (Belgium) Circuit de Spa-Francorchamps | Spa, Belgium | 1 June | FR2.0 3 | (United Kingdom) Oliver Rowland | (Netherlands) Manor MP Motorsport |
| (Belgium) Circuit de Spa-Francorchamps | Spa, Belgium | 1 June | EMT 3 | (Netherlands) Mike Verschuur | (Netherlands) McGregor by Equipe Verschuur |
| (Belgium) Circuit de Spa-Francorchamps | Spa, Belgium | 1 June | EC 3 | (France) Nicolas Milan | (France) Team LMV CL Brakes |
| (Belgium) Circuit de Spa-Francorchamps | Spa, Belgium | 2 June | FR3.5 7 | (Belgium) Stoffel Vandoorne | (United Kingdom) Fortec Motorsports |
| (Belgium) Circuit de Spa-Francorchamps | Spa, Belgium | 2 June | FR2.0 4 | (Italy) Luca Ghiotto | (Italy) Prema Powerteam |
| (Belgium) Circuit de Spa-Francorchamps | Spa, Belgium | 2 June | EMT 4 | (Italy) Mirko Bortolotti | (Italy) Oregon Team |
| (Belgium) Circuit de Spa-Francorchamps | Spa, Belgium | 2 June | EC 4 | (France) Nicolas Milan | (France) Team LMV CL Brakes |
| (Russia) Moscow Raceway | Volokolamsk, Russia | 22 June | FR3.5 8 | (Belgium) Stoffel Vandoorne | (United Kingdom) Fortec Motorsports |
| (Russia) Moscow Raceway | Volokolamsk, Russia | 22 June | FR2.0 5 | (France) Pierre Gasly | (France) Tech 1 Racing |
| (Russia) Moscow Raceway | Volokolamsk, Russia | 22 June | EMT 5 | (Italy) Mirko Bortolotti | (Italy) Oregon Team |
| (Russia) Moscow Raceway | Volokolamsk, Russia | 23 June | FR3.5 9 | (Belgium) Stoffel Vandoorne | (United Kingdom) Fortec Motorsports |
| (Russia) Moscow Raceway | Volokolamsk, Russia | 23 June | FR2.0 6 | (United Kingdom) Oliver Rowland | (Netherlands) Manor MP Motorsport |
| (Russia) Moscow Raceway | Volokolamsk, Russia | 23 June | EMT 6 | (Netherlands) Mike Verschuur | (Netherlands) McGregor by Equipe Verschuur |
| (Austria) Red Bull Ring | Spielberg, Austria | 20 July | FR3.5 10 | (Denmark) Marco Sørensen | (Czech Republic) Lotus |
| (Austria) Red Bull Ring | Spielberg, Austria | 20 July | FR2.0 7 | (Italy) Ignazio D'Agosto | (Belgium) KTR |
| (Austria) Red Bull Ring | Spielberg, Austria | 20 July | EMT 7 | (Italy) Mirko Bortolotti | (Italy) Oregon Team |
| (Austria) Red Bull Ring | Spielberg, Austria | 20 July | EC 5 | (Italy) Massimiliano Pedalà | (Italy) Composit Motorsport |
| (Austria) Red Bull Ring | Spielberg, Austria | 21 July | FR3.5 11 | (Denmark) Marco Sørensen | (Czech Republic) Lotus |
| (Austria) Red Bull Ring | Spielberg, Austria | 21 July | FR2.0 8 | (United Kingdom) Oliver Rowland | (Netherlands) Manor MP Motorsport |
| (Austria) Red Bull Ring | Spielberg, Austria | 21 July | EMT 8 | (Italy) Mirko Bortolotti | (Italy) Oregon Team |
| (Austria) Red Bull Ring | Spielberg, Austria | 21 July | EC 6 | (Italy) Massimiliano Pedalà | (Italy) Composit Motorsport |
| (Hungary) Hungaroring | Mogyoród, Hungary | 14 September | FR3.5 12 | (Switzerland) Nico Müller | (Italy) International Draco Racing |
| (Hungary) Hungaroring | Mogyoród, Hungary | 14 September | FR2.0 9 | (France) Pierre Gasly | (France) Tech 1 Racing |
| (Hungary) Hungaroring | Mogyoród, Hungary | 14 September | EMT 9 | (Italy) Mirko Bortolotti | (Italy) Oregon Team |
| (Hungary) Hungaroring | Mogyoród, Hungary | 15 September | FR3.5 13 | (Portugal) António Félix da Costa | (United Kingdom) Arden Caterham |
| (Hungary) Hungaroring | Mogyoród, Hungary | 15 September | FR2.0 10 | (Netherlands) Nyck de Vries | (Finland) Koiranen GP |
| (Hungary) Hungaroring | Mogyoród, Hungary | 15 September | EMT 10 | (Netherlands) Mike Verschuur | (Netherlands) McGregor by Equipe Verschuur |
| (France) Circuit Paul Ricard | Le Castellet, France | 28 September | FR3.5 14 | (Portugal) António Félix da Costa | (United Kingdom) Arden Caterham |
| (France) Circuit Paul Ricard | Le Castellet, France | 28 September | FR2.0 11 | (France) Pierre Gasly | (France) Tech 1 Racing |
| (France) Circuit Paul Ricard | Le Castellet, France | 28 September | EMT 11 | (Netherlands) Mike Verschuur | (Netherlands) McGregor by Equipe Verschuur |
| (France) Circuit Paul Ricard | Le Castellet, France | 28 September | EC 7 | (Spain) Oscar Nogués | (Italy) RMS Engineering |
| (France) Circuit Paul Ricard | Le Castellet, France | 29 September | FR3.5 15 | (Denmark) Kevin Magnussen | (France) DAMS |
| (France) Circuit Paul Ricard | Le Castellet, France | 29 September | FR2.0 12 | (France) Esteban Ocon | (France) ART Junior Team |
| (France) Circuit Paul Ricard | Le Castellet, France | 29 September | EC 8 | (France) Nicolas Milan | (France) Team LMV CL Brakes |
| (Spain) Circuit de Barcelona-Catalunya | Montmeló, Spain | 19 October | FR3.5 16 | (Denmark) Kevin Magnussen | (France) DAMS |
| (Spain) Circuit de Barcelona-Catalunya | Montmeló, Spain | 19 October | FR2.0 13 | (Netherlands) Nyck de Vries | (Finland) Koiranen GP |
| (Spain) Circuit de Barcelona-Catalunya | Montmeló, Spain | 19 October | EMT 12 | (Italy) Mirko Bortolotti | (Italy) Oregon Team |
| (Spain) Circuit de Barcelona-Catalunya | Montmeló, Spain | 19 October | EC 9 | (United Kingdom) Josh Files | (United Kingdom) Team Pyro |
| (Spain) Circuit de Barcelona-Catalunya | Montmeló, Spain | 20 October | FR3.5 17 | (Denmark) Kevin Magnussen | (France) DAMS |
| (Spain) Circuit de Barcelona-Catalunya | Montmeló, Spain | 20 October | FR2.0 14 | (France) Esteban Ocon | (France) ART Junior Team |
| (Spain) Circuit de Barcelona-Catalunya | Montmeló, Spain | 20 October | EMT 13 | (Switzerland) Stefano Comini | (France) Team Lompech Sport |
| (Spain) Circuit de Barcelona-Catalunya | Montmeló, Spain | 20 October | EMT 14 | (Netherlands) Mike Verschuur | (Netherlands) McGregor by Equipe Verschuur |
| (Spain) Circuit de Barcelona-Catalunya | Montmeló, Spain | 20 October | EC 10 | (United Kingdom) Josh Files | (United Kingdom) Team Pyro |
| (Spain) Ciudad del Motor de Aragón | Alcañiz, Spain | 2 November | EC 11 | (United Kingdom) Josh Files | (United Kingdom) Team Pyro |
| (Spain) Ciudad del Motor de Aragón | Alcañiz, Spain | 3 November | EC 12 | (Croatia) Ivan Pulic | (Slovenia) Lema Racing Team |

| Icon | Championship |
|---|---|
| FR3.5 | Formula Renault 3.5 Series |
| FR2.0 | Eurocup Formula Renault 2.0 |
| EMT | Eurocup Mégane Trophy |
| EC | Eurocup Clio |

== Championships ==
=== Formula Renault 3.5 Series ===
| Pos. | Driver | Team | Points |
|---|---|---|---|
| 1 | (Denmark) Kevin Magnussen | (France) DAMS | 274 |
| 2 | (Belgium) Stoffel Vandoorne | (United Kingdom) Fortec Motorsports | 214 |
| 3 | (Portugal) António Félix da Costa | (United Kingdom) Arden Caterham | 172 |
| 4 | (United Kingdom) Will Stevens | (United Kingdom) P1 by Strakka Racing | 148 |
| 5 | (Switzerland) Nico Müller | (Italy) International Draco Racing | 143 |

=== Eurocup Formula Renault 2.0 ===
| Pos. | Driver | Team | Points |
|---|---|---|---|
| 1 | (France) Pierre Gasly | (France) Tech 1 Racing | 195 |
| 2 | (United Kingdom) Oliver Rowland | (Netherlands) Manor MP Motorsport | 179 |
| 3 | (France) Esteban Ocon | (France) ART Junior Team | 159 |
| 4 | (United Kingdom) Jake Dennis | (United Kingdom) Fortec Motorsports | 130 |
| 5 | (Netherlands) Nyck de Vries | (Finland) Koiranen GP | 113 |

=== Eurocup Mégane Trophy ===
| Pos. | Driver | Team | Points |
|---|---|---|---|
| 1 | (Italy) Mirko Bortolotti | (Italy) Oregon Team | 275 |
| 2 | (Netherlands) Mike Verschuur | (Netherlands) McGregor by Equipe Verschuur | 237 |
| 3 | (Italy) Kevin Gilardoni | (Italy) Oregon Team | 169 |
| 4 | (Netherlands) Kelvin Snoeks | (Italy) Oregon Team | 129 |
| 5 | (Czech Republic) Erik Janiš | (Czech Republic) Gravity Charouz | 121 |

=== Eurocup Clio ===
| Pos. | Driver | Team | Points |
|---|---|---|---|
| 1 | (United Kingdom) Josh Files | (United Kingdom) Team Pyro | 198 |
| 2 | (Italy) Massimiliano Pedalà | (Italy) Composit Motorsport | 165 |
| 3 | (France) Nicolas Milan | (France) Team LMV CL Brakes | 161 |
| 4 | (Denmark) Thomas Fjordbach | (France) Polar Seafood Racing | 123 |
| 5 | (France) Éric Trémoulet | (France) Vic Team | 117 |
