= 2008 Eurocup Mégane Trophy =

Seasons
- ← 2007 2009 →

The 2008 Eurocup Mégane Trophy season was the fourth season of the Renault–supported touring car category, a one-make racing series that is part of the World Series by Renault. The season began at Circuit de Spa-Francorchamps on 3 May and finished at the Circuit de Barcelona-Catalunya on 19 October, after seven rounds and fourteen races. Michaël Rossi won the title, having battled with Maxime Martin for the entire campaign.

== Teams and drivers ==
Team	No.	Drivers	Class	Rounds
(France) Tech 1 Racing	1	(France) Dimitri Enjalbert		All
(France) Tech 1 Racing	2	(France) Matthieu Cheruy		All
(France) Tech 1 Racing	3	(Switzerland) Jonathan Hirschi		All
(France) Tech 1 Racing	4	(Belgium) Bernard Delhez	G	All
(France) Tech 1 Racing	22	(France) Matthieu Lahaye		7
(Netherlands) Equipe Verschuur	6	(Netherlands) Harrie Kollen	G	All
(Netherlands) Equipe Verschuur	7	(Netherlands) Bernhard ten Brinke		All
(Netherlands) Equipe Verschuur	20	(Netherlands) Wim Beelen		All
(Netherlands) Equipe Verschuur	21	(Netherlands) Hoevert Vos	G	All
(Belgium) Boutsen Energy Racing	8	(Belgium) Maxime Martin		All
(Belgium) Boutsen Energy Racing	9	(Monaco) David Dermont		All
(Belgium) Boutsen Energy Racing	22	(Belgium) Renaud Kuppens		1
(Belgium) Boutsen Energy Racing	22	(France) Marguerite Laffite		5
(Switzerland) Race Performance	10	(Switzerland) Ralph Meichtry		1–3
(Switzerland) Race Performance	10	(Switzerland) Nicolas Maulini		7
(Germany) Sesterheim Racing	11	(Austria) Andreas Mayerl		All
(France) TDS	12	(France) Michaël Rossi		All
(France) TDS	14	(France) Jean-Philippe Madonia	G	All
(France) Team Lompech Sport	15	(France) Sébastien Dhouailly		1–3, 5–7
(France) Team Lompech Sport	15	(France) Joël Dhouailly	G	4
(France) Team Lompech Sport	16	(France) Jean-Charles Miginiac	G	All
(France) Team Lompech Sport	17	(Switzerland) Pierre Hirschi	G	All
(Spain) Blue Jumeirah Team	18	(Spain) Rafael Unzurrunzaga	G	All
(Italy) Oregon Team	24	(France) Fabrice Walfisch		All
(Italy) Oregon Team	25	(Italy) Giuseppe Termine		1–2
(Italy) Oregon Team	25	(Italy) Secondo Gallia	G	3
(Italy) Oregon Team	25	(Switzerland) Daniele Perfetti		4
(Italy) Oregon Team	25	(Italy) Lorenzo Bontempelli	G	5
(Italy) Oregon Team	25	(Portugal) César Campaniço		6
(Italy) Oregon Team	25	(Netherlands) Robert van de Berg		7
(Italy) Oregon Team	26	(Italy) Nicolas Maulini		7
(Italy) Oregon Team	73	(Italy) Angelo Baiguera	G	All

Icon	Class
G	Gentleman Driver

== Race calendar and results ==
Round		Circuit	Date	Pole position	Fastest lap	Winning driver	Winning team
1	R1	(Belgium) Circuit de Spa-Francorchamps	3 May	(France) Michaël Rossi	(France) Michaël Rossi	(France) Michaël Rossi	(France) TDS
1	R2	(Belgium) Circuit de Spa-Francorchamps	4 May	(France) Michaël Rossi	(Switzerland) Jonathan Hirschi	(France) Michaël Rossi	(France) TDS
2	R1	(United Kingdom) Silverstone Circuit	7 June	(Belgium) Maxime Martin	(France) Michaël Rossi	(Belgium) Maxime Martin	(Belgium) Boutsen Energy Racing
2	R2	(United Kingdom) Silverstone Circuit	8 June	(Belgium) Maxime Martin	(France) Dimitri Enjalbert	(Belgium) Maxime Martin	(Belgium) Boutsen Energy Racing
3	R1	(Hungary) Hungaroring	5 July	(France) Michaël Rossi	(France) Michaël Rossi	(Belgium) Maxime Martin	(Belgium) Boutsen Energy Racing
3	R2	(Hungary) Hungaroring	6 July	(France) Michaël Rossi	(France) Michaël Rossi	(France) Michaël Rossi	(France) TDS
4	R1	(Germany) Nürburgring	30 August	(France) Michaël Rossi	(France) Michaël Rossi	(Monaco) David Dermont	(Belgium) Boutsen Energy Racing
4	R2	(Germany) Nürburgring	31 August	(France) Michaël Rossi	(Belgium) Maxime Martin	(Belgium) Maxime Martin	(Belgium) Boutsen Energy Racing
5	R1	(France) Bugatti Circuit, Le Mans	6 September	(France) Dimitri Enjalbert	(France) Dimitri Enjalbert	(France) Dimitri Enjalbert	(France) Tech 1 Racing
5	R2	(France) Bugatti Circuit, Le Mans	7 September	(France) Dimitri Enjalbert	(France) Michaël Rossi	(Belgium) Maxime Martin	(Belgium) Boutsen Energy Racing
6	R1	(Portugal) Autódromo do Estoril	27 September	(France) Michaël Rossi	(France) Dimitri Enjalbert	(Belgium) Maxime Martin	(Belgium) Boutsen Energy Racing
6	R2	(Portugal) Autódromo do Estoril	28 September	(France) Michaël Rossi	(France) Dimitri Enjalbert	(France) Michaël Rossi	(France) TDS
7	R1	(Spain) Circuit de Catalunya, Montmeló	18 October	(France) Dimitri Enjalbert	(France) Dimitri Enjalbert	(France) Dimitri Enjalbert	(France) Tech 1 Racing
7	R2	(Spain) Circuit de Catalunya, Montmeló	19 October	(France) Dimitri Enjalbert	(France) Dimitri Enjalbert	(France) Dimitri Enjalbert	(France) Tech 1 Racing

== Drivers' Championship ==
Position	1st	2nd	3rd	4th	5th	6th	7th	8th	9th	10th	Pole
Points	15	12	10	8	6	5	4	3	2	1	1

Pos	Driver	SPA (Belgium)		SIL (United Kingdom)		HUN (Hungary)		NÜR (Germany)		BUG (France)		EST (Portugal)		CAT (Spain)		Points
1	(France) Michaël Rossi	**1**	**1**	7	2	**2**	**1**	**2**	**2**	3	2	**3**	**1**	2	3	170
2	(Belgium) Maxime Martin	4	6	**1**	**1**	1	3	7	1	2	1	1	2	Ret	2	154
3	(France) Dimitri Enjalbert	13	2	4	3	6	2	Ret	3	**1**	**Ret**	2	3	**1**	**1**	126
4	(France) Matthieu Cheruy	2	3	8	5	8	4	8	8	5	3	12	6	6	4	84
5	(France) Sébastien Dhouailly	Ret	7	3	4	3	6			6	4	4	5	5	8	78
6	(Switzerland) Jonathan Hirschi	3	4	6	6	Ret	14	4	4	7	Ret	5	7	3	5	75
7	(Netherlands) Bernhard ten Brinke	7	Ret	2	7	4	5	3	7	Ret	7	11	10	7	9	64
8	(France) Fabrice Walfisch	5	8	5	8	7	7	Ret	9	4	5	6	8	10	7	59
9	(Monaco) David Dermont	11	11	15	9	10	12	1	DNS	8	10	10	11	9	10	32
10	(France) Jean-Philippe Madonia	Ret	14	9	Ret	5	9	5	5	Ret	8	8	12	11	Ret	32
11	(Austria) Andreas Mayerl	8	9	13	Ret	9	11	6	DSQ	Ret	11	9	13	Ret	13	16
12	(Netherlands) Wim Beelen	DNS	15	12	10	Ret	8	9	10	9	9	Ret	Ret	16	Ret	12
13	(Belgium) Renaud Kuppens	6	5													11
14	(Netherlands) Hoevert Vos	9	12	10	Ret	11	13	Ret	12	10	Ret	Ret	9	Ret	11	8
15	(France) Ludovic Badey							Ret	6							5
16	(Belgium) Bernard Delhez	12	13	14	Ret	12	10	10	DSQ	16	12	15	15	13	Ret	3
17	(Italy) Giuseppe Termine	10	10	Ret	Ret											2
18	(Netherlands) Harrie Kolen	15	18	16	11	14	18	Ret	DSQ	12	16	13	14	17	16	0
19	(France) Jean-Charles Miginiac	16	Ret	18	Ret	13	15	11	13	11	14	Ret	16	18	17	0
20	(Switzerland) Pierre Hirschi	14	16	17	12	15	16	12	11	13	13	16	18	15	18	0
21	(Switzerland) Ralph Meichtry	DNS	Ret	11	Ret	Ret	Ret									0
22	(Italy) Angelo Baiguera	Ret	17	19	13	16	17	Ret	14	14	17	14	17	14	19	0
23	(Spain) Rafael Unzurrunzaga	17	Ret	20	14	17	20	14	Ret	17	18	Ret	19	Ret	20	0
24	(France) Joël Dhouailly							13	15							0
25	(Italy) Secondo Gallia					18	19									0
	(Switzerland) Daniele Perfetti							Ret	DNS							0
guest drivers ineligible for points
	(France) Matthieu Lahaye													4	6	
	(Portugal) César Campaniço											7	4			
	(Italy) Lorenzo Bontempelli									Ret	6					
	(Italy) Simone di Luca													8	14	
	(Switzerland) Nicolas Maulini													19	12	
	(Netherlands) Robert van de Berg													12	15	
	(France) Marguerite Laffite									15	15					
Pos	Driver	SPA (Belgium)		SIL (United Kingdom)		HUN (Hungary)		NÜR (Germany)		BUG (France)		EST (Portugal)		CAT (Spain)		Points

Colour	Result
Gold	Winner
Silver	Second place
Bronze	Third place
Green	Points classification
Blue	Non-points classification
Blue	Non-classified finish (NC)
Purple	Retired, not classified (Ret)
Red	Did not qualify (DNQ)
Red	Did not pre-qualify (DNPQ)
Black	Disqualified (DSQ)
White	Did not start (DNS)
White	Withdrew (WD)
White	Race cancelled (C)
Blank	Did not practice (DNP)
Blank	Did not arrive (DNA)
Blank	Excluded (EX)

**Bold** – Pole
Italics – Fastest Lap
