= 2007 Eurocup Mégane Trophy =

Seasons
- ← 2006 2008 →

The 2007 Eurocup Mégane Trophy season was the third season of the Renault–supported touring car category, a one-make racing series that is part of the World Series by Renault. The season began at Circuit Zolder on 21 April and finished at the Circuit de Catalunya on 28 October, after seven rounds and fourteen races. Pedro Petiz won the title, having battled with his team-mate Dimitri Enjalbert for the entire campaign.

== Teams and drivers ==
Team	No.	Drivers	Class	Rounds
(France) Tech 1 Racing	1	(France) Matthieu Lahaye	J	All
(France) Tech 1 Racing	31	(France) Dimitri Enjalbert	J	All
(France) Tech 1 Racing	32	(Portugal) Pedro Petiz	J	All
(France) Tech 1 Racing	33	(France) Sébastien Dhouailly	J	All
(Netherlands) Equipe Verschuur	5	(Netherlands) Mike Verschuur	J	All
(Netherlands) Equipe Verschuur	6	(Netherlands) Wim Beelen		All
(Netherlands) Equipe Verschuur	7	(Netherlands) Bernhard ten Brinke		All
(Netherlands) Equipe Verschuur	72	(Belgium) Gregory Franchi		1, 3–5, 7
(Netherlands) Equipe Verschuur	72	(Belgium) Vincent Vosse		1
(Netherlands) Equipe Verschuur	72	(Portugal) César Campaniço		6
(Switzerland) Race Performance	8	(Switzerland) Ralph Meichtry		All
(France) TDS	9	(France) Jean-Philippe Madonia		1–5, 7
(France) TDS	20	(France) Ludovic Badey		All
(France) TDS	21	(France) Mathieu Cheruy	J	All
(Belgium) Boutsen Energy Racing	10	(Belgium) Geoffroy Horion		1, 3
(Belgium) Boutsen Energy Racing	10	(Belgium) Renaud Kuppens		1, 7
(Belgium) Boutsen Energy Racing	10	(Belgium) David Dermont		5
(Belgium) Boutsen Energy Racing	10	(France) Johan-Boris Scheier	J	6
(Belgium) Boutsen Energy Racing	11	(Belgium) Maxime Martin	J	All
(Belgium) Boutsen Energy Racing	11	(Belgium) Maxime Soulet	J	1
(Germany) Sesterheim Racing	12	(Austria) Andreas Mayerl		All
(Italy) Oregon Team	14	(Italy) Giuseppe Cirò	J	All
(Italy) Oregon Team	15	(Italy) Diego Romanini	J	1–2
(Italy) Oregon Team	15	(Italy) Andrea Pagliai		3
(Italy) Oregon Team	15	(France) Jean-Philippe Dayraut		5
(Italy) Oregon Team	15	(Italy) Massimiliano Pedalà		7
(France) Team Lompech Sport	16	(France) Jean-Charles Miginiac		All
(France) Team Lompech Sport	17	(France) Fabrice Walfisch		All
Racing for Belgium	22	(France) Michaël Rossi	J	All
Racing for Belgium	23	(Netherlands) Carlo van Dam	J	1–5
Racing for Belgium	23	(Belgium) Wim Coelkelbergs		7
(France) Renault Sport Presse	99	(Belgium) Bas Leinders		1
(France) Renault Sport Presse	99	(Belgium) François Duval		1
(France) Renault Sport Presse	99	(France) Stéphane Enout	J	5
(France) Renault Sport Presse	99	(France) Romain Bernard	J	5
(France) Renault Sport Presse	99	(France) Yvan Lebon		7
(France) Renault Sport Presse	99	(Spain) Ignacio Gabari		7

Icon	Class
J	Junior Class

== Race calendar and results ==
Round		Circuit	Date	Pole position	Fastest lap	Winning driver	Winning team
1	R1	(Belgium) Circuit Zolder	21 April	(Portugal) Pedro Petiz	(Portugal) Pedro Petiz	(Portugal) Pedro Petiz	(France) Tech 1 Racing
1	R2	(Belgium) Circuit Zolder	22 April	(France) Dimitri Enjalbert	(Portugal) Pedro Petiz	(Switzerland) Ralph Meichtry	(Switzerland) Race Performance
2	R1	(Germany) Nürburgring	5 May	(France) Dimitri Enjalbert	(France) Dimitri Enjalbert	(France) Dimitri Enjalbert	(France) Tech 1 Racing
2	R2	(Germany) Nürburgring	6 May	(France) Dimitri Enjalbert	(France) Dimitri Enjalbert	(Portugal) Pedro Petiz	(France) Tech 1 Racing
3	R1	(Hungary) Hungaroring	14 July	(France) Michaël Rossi	(Belgium) Maxime Martin	(France) Michaël Rossi	Racing for Belgium
3	R2	(Hungary) Hungaroring	15 July	(France) Michaël Rossi	(Belgium) Gregory Franchi	(Belgium) Gregory Franchi	(Netherlands) Equipe Verschuur
4	R1	(United Kingdom) Donington Park	8 September	(France) Fabrice Walfish	(Belgium) Gregory Franchi	(France) Matthieu Lahaye	(France) Tech 1 Racing
4	R2	(United Kingdom) Donington Park	9 September	(France) Fabrice Walfish	(Belgium) Maxime Martin	(Switzerland) Ralph Meichtry	(Switzerland) Race Performance
5	R1	(France) Circuit de Nevers Magny-Cours	22 September	(France) Fabrice Walfish	(Portugal) Pedro Petiz	(France) Ludovic Badey	(France) TDS
5	R2	(France) Circuit de Nevers Magny-Cours	23 September	(France) Fabrice Walfish	(France) Dimitri Enjalbert	(Portugal) Pedro Petiz	(France) Tech 1 Racing
6	R1	(Portugal) Autódromo do Estoril	20 October	(Belgium) Maxime Martin	(France) Dimitri Enjalbert	(Portugal) Pedro Petiz	(France) Tech 1 Racing
6	R2	(Portugal) Autódromo do Estoril	21 October	(Belgium) Maxime Martin	(France) Matthieu Lahaye	(Belgium) Maxime Martin	(Belgium) Boutsen Energy Racing
7	R1	(Spain) Circuit de Catalunya, Montmeló	27 October	(France) Fabrice Walfish	(France) Dimitri Enjalbert	(France) Dimitri Enjalbert	(France) Tech 1 Racing
7	R2	(Spain) Circuit de Catalunya, Montmeló	28 October	(Belgium) Renaud Kuppens	(France) Dimitri Enjalbert	(Netherlands) Mike Verschuur	(Netherlands) Equipe Verschuur

== Standings ==
=== Drivers' Championship ===
Position	1st	2nd	3rd	4th	5th	6th	7th	8th	9th	10th	Pole	FL
Points	15	12	10	8	6	5	4	3	2	1	1	1

Pos	Driver	ZOL (Belgium)		NÜR (Germany)		HUN (Hungary)		DON (United Kingdom)		MAG (France)		EST (Portugal)		CAT (Spain)		Points
1	(Portugal) Pedro Petiz	**1**	3	3	1	3	3	2	3	6	1	1	7	3	Ret	146
2	(France) Dimitri Enjalbert	2	**2**	**1**	**3**	Ret	5	Ret	2	5	4	5	2	1	10	126
3	(Belgium) Maxime Martin (Note: Martin and Soulet shared the same car in the first race at Zolder. Martin was ineligible to score points in the race.)	10		4	2	8	8	8	7	3	Ret	**3**	**1**	7	5	85
4	(Switzerland) Ralph Meichtry	16	1	5	7	12	2	11	1	14	3	Ret	4	19	3	80
5	(France) Matthieu Lahaye	8	Ret	2	4	6	9	1	Ret	12	Ret	Ret	3	2	11	69
6	(Netherlands) Mike Verschuur	Ret	13	8	10	4	7	4	Ret	9	2	6	Ret	4	1	68
7	(Netherlands) Bernhard ten Brinke	3	6	9	6	Ret	6	Ret	4	11	5	2	8	9	Ret	59
8	(France) Fabrice Walfish	7	Ret	6	5	2	4	**10**	**9**	**Ret**	**10**	7	6	**Ret**	7	57
9	(France) Michaël Rossi	Ret	14	13	9	**1**	**Ret**	3	Ret	Ret	9	8	5	12	Ret	41
10	(France) Sébastien Dhouailly	11	5	7	8	14	10	7	5	4	Ret	9	12	10	12	38
11	(Belgium) Gregory Franchi (Note: Franchi and Vosse shared the same car in both races at Zolder.)	5	10			Ret	1	6	Ret	10	13			5	15	37
12	(Italy) Giuseppe Cirò	13	4	Ret	12	11	12	5	Ret	7	Ret	11	9	6	4	36
13	(France) Ludovic Badey	6	8	11	11	5	Ret	9	Ret	1	Ret	12	15	Ret	Ret	35
14	(France) Matthieu Cheruy	4	Ret	12	13	7	11	15	8	Ret	6	13	10	8	6	29
15	(Belgium) Renaud Kuppens (Note: Kuppens and Horion shared the same car in the first race at Zolder and in both races at Hungaroring. In the last place Kuppens was ineligible to score points.)	9			9	Ret								11	**2**	16
16	(Belgium) Vincent Vosse	5	10													7
17	(France) Jean-Philippe Madonia	17	Ret	15	14	13	Ret	14	Ret	15	8			15	8	7
18	(Netherlands) Carlo van Dam	14	Ret	10	Ret	10	Ret	Ret	Ret	8	DSQ					6
19	(Belgium) Geoffroy Horion	9	9			9	Ret									6
20	(Austria) Andreas Mayerl	12	12	14	16	DSQ	Ret	13	6	13	Ret	14	Ret	14	Ret	5
21	(Italy) Diego Romanini	18	7	18	17											4
22	(France) Jean-Charles Miginiac	19	15	16	15	15	Ret	12	10	17	11	15	13	18	14	2
23	(Belgium) Maxime Soulet	10	11													1
24	(Netherlands) Wim Beelen	Ret	16	17	18	Ret	14	Ret	11	19	12	Ret	14	Ret	DNS	0
25	(Italy) Andrea Pagliai					16	13									0
26	(Belgium) Bas Leinders (Note: Duval shared the same car with François Duval in both races at Zolder.)	15	Ret													0
guest drivers ineligible for points
	(France) Jean-Philippe Dayraut									2	Ret					
	(Portugal) César Campaniço											4	11			
	(Belgium) David Dermont									16	7					
	(Italy) Massimiliano Pedalà													13	9	
	(France) Johan-Boris Scheier											10	Ret			
	(Belgium) Wim Coelkelbergs													16	13	
	(France) Yvan Lebon (Note: Lebon shared the same car with Ignacio Gabari in both races at Barcelona.)													17	16	
	(France) Stéphane Enout (Note: Enout shared the same car with Romain Bernard at Magny-Cours.)									18	DNS					
Pos	Driver	ZOL (Belgium)		NÜR (Germany)		HUN (Hungary)		DON (United Kingdom)		MAG (France)		EST (Portugal)		CAT (Spain)		Points

Colour	Result
Gold	Winner
Silver	Second place
Bronze	Third place
Green	Points classification
Blue	Non-points classification
Blue	Non-classified finish (NC)
Purple	Retired, not classified (Ret)
Red	Did not qualify (DNQ)
Red	Did not pre-qualify (DNPQ)
Black	Disqualified (DSQ)
White	Did not start (DNS)
White	Withdrew (WD)
White	Race cancelled (C)
Blank	Did not practice (DNP)
Blank	Did not arrive (DNA)
Blank	Excluded (EX)

**Bold** – Pole
Italics – Fastest Lap
