= 2012 Eurocup Clio =

Seasons
- ← 2011 2013 →

The 2012 Eurocup Clio season was the second season of the Renault–supported touring car category, a one-make racing series that is part of the World Series by Renault, the series uses Renault Clio RS 197's.

The title was clinched by Rangoni Motorsport driver Oscar Nogués, who won three races. Marc Guillot and Mike Verschuur completed top-three in the standings, with two and one win respectively.

== Race calendar and results ==
Round		Circuit	Country	Date	Pole position	Fastest lap	Winning driver	Winning team
1	R1	Circuit de Spa-Francorchamps	Belgium	2 June	(Netherlands) Mike Verschuur	(Italy) Simone di Luca	(France) Marc Guillot	(France) Milan Competition
1	R2	Circuit de Spa-Francorchamps	Belgium	3 June	(Netherlands) Mike Verschuur	(Netherlands) Mike Verschuur	(Netherlands) Mike Verschuur	(Netherlands) Equipe Verschuur
2	R1	Nürburgring	Germany	30 June	(France) Marc Guillot	(France) Marc Guillot	(Spain) Oscar Nogués	(Italy) Rangoni Motorsport
2	R2	Nürburgring	Germany	1 July	(France) Marc Guillot	(France) Marc Guillot	(France) Marc Guillot	(France) Milan Competition
3	R1	Circuit Paul Ricard, Le Castellet	France	29 September	(Romania) Salvatore Arcarese	(Spain) Rafael Villanueva	(Spain) Oscar Nogués	(Italy) Rangoni Motorsport
3	R2	Circuit Paul Ricard, Le Castellet	France	30 September	(France) Yoann Baziret	(Netherlands) Mike Verschuur	(France) Yoann Baziret	(France) Setup Racing
4	R1	Circuit de Catalunya, Montmeló	Spain	20 October	(Spain) Jordi Palomeras	(Spain) Rafael Villanueva	(Spain) Oscar Nogués	(Italy) Rangoni Motorsport
4	R2	Circuit de Catalunya, Montmeló	Spain	21 October	(Spain) Oscar Nogués	(Spain) Alex Villanueva	(Italy) Christian Ricciarini	(Italy) Composit Motorsport
