= 2011 Eurocup Mégane Trophy =

Motor racing competition

Seasons
- ← 2010 2012 →

The 2011 Eurocup Mégane Trophy season was the seventh season of the Renault–supported touring car category, a one-make racing series that is part of the World Series by Renault.

Stefano Comini won the championship with two rounds (and four races) to go, courtesy of winning all bar one of the previous races of the year.

After featuring nine teams during the 2010 season, following the late withdrawal of Brixia Autosport, the grid featured nine teams once again in 2011.

== Regulation changes ==
=== Sporting ===
- The points system for the 2011 season was changed to reflect the system used by the FIA for World championships. The top ten drivers in each race were awarded points as follows: 25, 18, 15, 12, 10, 8, 6, 4, 2, and 1.

== Driver lineup ==
| Team | No. | Driver | Status | Rounds |
|---|---|---|---|---|
| (France) TDS Racing | 1 | (Netherlands) Jeroen Schothorst | G | All |
| (France) TDS Racing | 2 | (Belgium) David Dermont | G | All |
| (France) TDS Racing | 3 | (Netherlands) Bas Schothorst | | All |
| (France) TDS Racing | 4 | (Netherlands) Wim Beelen | G | All |
| (Italy) Oregon Team | 6 | (Italy) Enrico Bettera | G | All |
| (Italy) Oregon Team | 6 | (Italy) Navajo | G | 1–5, 7 |
| (Italy) Oregon Team | 7 | (Italy) Navajo | G | 6 |
| (Italy) Oregon Team | 7 | (Spain) Oscar Nogués | | 7 |
| (Italy) Oregon Team | 8 | (Italy) Niccolò Nalio | | All |
| (Italy) Oregon Team | 25 | (Switzerland) Stefano Comini | | All |
| (Belgium) Boutsen Energy Racing | 10 | (Netherlands) Jochen Habets | | All |
| (Belgium) Boutsen Energy Racing | 11 | (Switzerland) Fabien Thuner | | All |
| (Belgium) Boutsen Energy Racing | 27 | (Italy) Michele Faccin | | All |
| (France) Team Lompech Sport | 12 | (France) Dimitri Enjalbert | | 1–2 |
| (France) Team Lompech Sport | 12 | (France) Grégory Guilvert | | 3–7 |
| (France) Team Lompech Sport | 14 | (France) Jean-Charles Miginiac | G | All |
| (Netherlands) Equipe Verschuur | 15 | (Netherlands) Steven Gijsen | G | 1–3 |
| (Netherlands) Equipe Verschuur | 15 | (Sweden) Richard Kressner | G | 5–6 |
| (Netherlands) Equipe Verschuur | 15 | (Spain) Álvaro Barba | | 7 |
| (Netherlands) Equipe Verschuur | 15 | (Netherlands) Peter Peters | G | 4 |
| (Netherlands) Equipe Verschuur | 16 | (Netherlands) Peter Peters | G | 2 |
| (Netherlands) Equipe Verschuur | 16 | (Netherlands) Wilko Becker | G | 3 |
| (Netherlands) Equipe Verschuur | 17 | (Netherlands) Bernhardt ten Brinke | | 3 |
| (Netherlands) Equipe Verschuur | 17 | (Netherlands) Jelle Beelen | | 5 |
| (Netherlands) Equipe Verschuur | 17 | (Netherlands) Ruud Steenmetz | | 6 |
| (Netherlands) Equipe Verschuur | 17 | (France) Jean-Philippe Dayraut | | 7 |
| (Italy) Brixia Horse Power | 17 | (Germany) Sebastian Stahl | | 4 |
| (Italy) Brixia Horse Power | 73 | (Germany) Sebastian Stahl | | 3 |
| (Italy) Brixia Horse Power | 73 | (Italy) Angelo Baiguera | G | 1, 4–7 |
| (Italy) Brixia Horse Power | 73 | (Italy) Angelo Baiguera | | 2–3 |
| (Italy) Brixia Horse Power | 73 | (Italy) Andrea Cecchellero | | 2 |
| (Italy) Brixia Horse Power | 73 | (Italy) Andrea Baiguera | G | 7 |
| (United Arab Emirates) Blue Jumeirah Team | 18 | (Spain) Rafael Unzurrunzaga | G | All |
| (Spain) PujolaRacing | 22 | (Spain) Toni Forne | G | All |
| (Germany) AFK Motorsport | 23 | (Germany) Oliver Freymuth | G | All |
| (Portugal) Algarve Pro Racing Team | 24 | (United Kingdom) Michael Munemann | G | 2–7 |

| Icon | Class |
|---|---|
| G | Gentleman Driver |

=== Driver changes ===
Changed teams

- Dimitri Enjalbert moved to Team Lompech Sport.
- Wim Beelen moved to TDS Racing.
- Bas Schothorst and Jeroen Schothorst both moved to TDS Racing.

Entering Eurocup Mégane Trophy

- Enrico Battera competed for Oregon Team.
- Jochen Habets and Michele Faccin drove for Boutsen Energy Racing.
- Toni Forne raced for PujolaRacing.
- Oliver Freymuth participated for AFK Motorsport.

=== Team changes ===
- PujolaRacing and AFK Motorsport debuted in the Eurocup Mégane Trophy.

== Race calendar and results ==
The calendar for the 2011 season was announced on 11 October 2010, the day after the end of the 2010 season.| All of the seven rounds formed meetings of the 2011 World Series by Renault season.

| Round | | Circuit | Country | Date | Pole position | Fastest lap | Winning driver | Winning team |
|---|---|---|---|---|---|---|---|---|
| 1 | R1 | Ciudad del Motor de Aragón, Alcañiz | Spain | 16 April | (Switzerland) Stefano Comini | (Netherlands) Bas Schothorst | (Switzerland) Stefano Comini | (Italy) Oregon Team |
| 1 | R2 | Ciudad del Motor de Aragón, Alcañiz | Spain | 17 April | (Switzerland) Stefano Comini | (Switzerland) Stefano Comini | (Switzerland) Stefano Comini | (Italy) Oregon Team |
| 2 | R1 | Circuit de Spa-Francorchamps | Belgium | 30 April | (Switzerland) Stefano Comini | (Switzerland) Stefano Comini | (Switzerland) Stefano Comini | (Italy) Oregon Team |
| 2 | R2 | Circuit de Spa-Francorchamps | Belgium | 1 May | (Switzerland) Stefano Comini | (Netherlands) Bas Schothorst | (Switzerland) Stefano Comini | (Italy) Oregon Team |
| 3 | R1 | Nürburgring | Germany | 18 June | (Switzerland) Stefano Comini | (Netherlands) Bas Schothorst | (Switzerland) Stefano Comini | (Italy) Oregon Team |
| 3 | R2 | Nürburgring | Germany | 19 June | (Switzerland) Stefano Comini | (Switzerland) Stefano Comini | (Switzerland) Stefano Comini | (Italy) Oregon Team |
| 4 | R1 | Hungaroring, Mogyoród | Hungary | 2 July | (Switzerland) Stefano Comini | (Netherlands) Bas Schothorst | (Italy) Niccolò Nalio | (Italy) Oregon Team |
| 4 | R2 | Hungaroring, Mogyoród | Hungary | 3 July | (Switzerland) Stefano Comini | (Switzerland) Stefano Comini | (Switzerland) Stefano Comini | (Italy) Oregon Team |
| 5 | R1 | Silverstone Circuit | United Kingdom | 20 August | (Switzerland) Stefano Comini | (Switzerland) Stefano Comini | (Switzerland) Stefano Comini | (Italy) Oregon Team |
| 5 | R2 | Silverstone Circuit | United Kingdom | 21 August | (Switzerland) Stefano Comini | (Switzerland) Stefano Comini | (Switzerland) Stefano Comini | (Italy) Oregon Team |
| 6 | R1 | Circuit Paul Ricard, Le Castellet | France | 17 September | (Netherlands) Bas Schothorst | (Switzerland) Stefano Comini | (Netherlands) Bas Schothorst | (France) TDS Racing |
| 6 | R2 | Circuit Paul Ricard, Le Castellet | France | 18 September | (Netherlands) Bas Schothorst | (Netherlands) Bas Schothorst | (Switzerland) Stefano Comini | (Italy) Oregon Team |
| 7 | R1 | Circuit de Catalunya, Montmeló | Spain | 8 October | (Switzerland) Stefano Comini | (Netherlands) Bas Schothorst | (Switzerland) Stefano Comini | (Italy) Oregon Team |
| 7 | R2 | Circuit de Catalunya, Montmeló | Spain | 9 October | (Switzerland) Stefano Comini | (Switzerland) Stefano Comini | (Italy) Niccolò Nalio | (Italy) Oregon Team |

== Championship standings ==
- Points for both championships were awarded as follows:

| 1st | 2nd | 3rd | 4th | 5th | 6th | 7th | 8th | 9th | 10th |
|---|---|---|---|---|---|---|---|---|---|
| 25 | 18 | 15 | 12 | 10 | 8 | 6 | 4 | 2 | 1 |

=== Drivers' Championship ===
| Pos | Driver | ALC (Spain) | | SPA (Belgium) | | NÜR (Germany) | | HUN (Hungary) | | SIL (United Kingdom) | | LEC (France) | | CAT (Spain) | | Points |
|---|---|---|---|---|---|---|---|---|---|---|---|---|---|---|---|---|
| 1 | (Switzerland) Stefano Comini | **1** | **1** | **1** | **1** | **1** | **1** | **2** | **1** | **1** | **1** | 4 | 1 | **1** | **DSQ** | 305 |
| 2 | (Italy) Niccolò Nalio | 2 | 2 | 4 | Ret | 5 | 3 | 1 | 4 | 2 | 3 | 6 | 5 | 11 | 1 | 188 |
| 3 | (Netherlands) Bas Schothorst | 3 | 6 | Ret | Ret | 2 | 7 | Ret | 2 | 3 | 2 | **1** | **2** | Ret | 7 | 149 |
| 4 | (Belgium) David Dermont | 4 | 5 | DNS | 4 | 3 | 4 | 3 | 3 | 7 | 7 | Ret | 7 | 7 | 2 | 135 |
| 5 | (France) Grégory Guilvert | | | | | 4 | 2 | 5 | 6 | 4 | Ret | 2 | 3 | Ret | 6 | 103 |
| 6 | (Italy) Michele Faccin | Ret | 8 | 13 | 3 | 6 | 6 | 9 | 9 | 6 | 5 | 5 | 6 | 3 | 9 | 97 |
| 7 | (Switzerland) Fabien Thuner | 5 | 4 | 3 | Ret | 9 | 5 | 8 | 11 | 5 | 4 | 3 | 11 | 16 | 10 | 93 |
| 8 | (Netherlands) Wim Beelen | 6 | 7 | Ret | 8 | 8 | 11 | 4 | 5 | 8 | 6 | Ret | 4 | 5 | Ret | 80 |
| 9 | (Spain) Toni Forne | 10 | 11 | 9 | 6 | 18 | Ret | 6 | Ret | 10 | 8 | 7 | 8 | 4 | 3 | 64 |
| 10 | (France) Dimitri Enjalbert | Ret | 3 | 2 | 2 | | | | | | | | | | | 51 |
| 11 | (Netherlands) Jochen Habets | 7 | 9 | 11 | 5 | 14 | Ret | 10 | 7 | 9 | 9 | Ret | 15 | 6 | 4 | 51 |
| 12 | (Netherlands) Jeroen Schothorst | 8 | Ret | 7 | 9 | 10 | 9 | 11 | 10 | Ret | 10 | 9 | 12 | 10 | 8 | 29 |
| 13 | (France) Jean-Charles Miginiac | 9 | 12 | 10 | 10 | 12 | 10 | 7 | 8 | 13 | 12 | 10 | 14 | 8 | Ret | 22 |
| 14 | (Italy) Andrea Cecchellero | | | 5 | | | | | | | | | | | | 10 |
| 15 | (Netherlands) Bernhardt ten Brinke | | | | | 7 | 8 | | | | | | | | | 10 |
| 16 | (Italy) Navajo | | 13 | 6 | | 16 | | 13 | | | 11 | 14 | Ret | | 12 | 8 |
| 17 | (Italy) Enrico Bettera | Ret | | | 11 | | 14 | | 12 | 12 | | 8 | 10 | 12 | | 7 |
| 18 | (Netherlands) Peter Peters | | | Ret | 7 | | | 15 | DSQ | | | | | | | 6 |
| 19 | (Germany) Oliver Freymuth | Ret | 16 | 8 | 12 | 13 | 13 | 16 | 14 | 14 | 15 | 11 | 16 | Ret | Ret | 4 |
| 20 | (Netherlands) Steven Gijsen | Ret | 10 | Ret | 16 | Ret | Ret | | | | | | | | | 1 |
| 21 | (United Kingdom) Michael Munemann | | | Ret | 13 | 17 | Ret | 12 | Ret | 16 | NC | Ret | 17 | 13 | 11 | 1 |
| 22 | (Netherlands) Wilko Becker | | | | | 11 | 12 | | | | | | | | | 0 |
| 23 | (Italy) Angelo Baiguera | 11 | 14 | | 14 | | 15 | Ret | Ret | 17 | 14 | 13 | 18 | 14 | | 0 |
| 24 | (Spain) Rafael Unzurrunzaga | 12 | 15 | 12 | 15 | Ret | Ret | 14 | 13 | 18 | 17 | 15 | 19 | 15 | 13 | 0 |
| 25 | (Germany) Sebastian Stahl | | | | | 15 | | DNS | DNS | | | | | | | 0 |
Guest drivers ineligible for points
| | (Spain) Álvaro Barba | | | | | | | | | | | | | 2 | Ret | 0 |
| | (Spain) Oscar Nogués | | | | | | | | | | | | | 9 | 5 | 0 |
| | (Netherlands) Ruud Steenmetz | | | | | | | | | | | 12 | 9 | | | 0 |
| | (Sweden) Richard Kressner | | | | | | | | | 11 | 16 | Ret | 13 | | | 0 |
| | (Netherlands) Jelle Beelen | | | | | | | | | 15 | 13 | | | | | 0 |
| | (Italy) Andrea Baiguera | | | | | | | | | | | | | | 14 | 0 |
| | (France) Jean-Philippe Dayraut | | | | | | | | | | | | | Ret | 15 | 0 |
| Pos | Driver | ALC (Spain) | | SPA (Belgium) | | NÜR (Germany) | | HUN (Hungary) | | SIL (United Kingdom) | | LEC (France) | | CAT (Spain) | | Points |

| Colour | Result |
|---|---|
| Gold | Winner |
| Silver | Second place |
| Bronze | Third place |
| Green | Points classification |
| Blue | Non-points classification |
| Blue | Non-classified finish (NC) |
| Purple | Retired, not classified (Ret) |
| Red | Did not qualify (DNQ) |
| Red | Did not pre-qualify (DNPQ) |
| Black | Disqualified (DSQ) |
| White | Did not start (DNS) |
| White | Withdrew (WD) |
| White | Race cancelled (C) |
| Blank | Did not practice (DNP) |
| Blank | Did not arrive (DNA) |
| Blank | Excluded (EX) |

**Bold** – Pole
Italics – Fastest Lap
† – Retired, but classified

=== Teams' Championship ===
| Pos | Team | ALC (Spain) | | SPA (Belgium) | | NÜR (Germany) | | HUN (Hungary) | | SIL (United Kingdom) | | LEC (France) | | CAT (Spain) | | Points |
|---|---|---|---|---|---|---|---|---|---|---|---|---|---|---|---|---|
| 1 | (Italy) Oregon Team | 1 | 1 | 1 | 1 | 1 | 1 | 1 | 1 | 1 | 1 | 4 | 1 | 1 | 1 | 493 |
| 1 | (Italy) Oregon Team | 2 | 2 | 4 | 11 | 5 | 3 | 2 | 4 | 2 | 3 | 6 | 5 | 11 | DSQ | 493 |
| 2 | (France) TDS Racing | 3 | 5 | Ret | 4 | 2 | 4 | 3 | 2 | 3 | 2 | 1 | 2 | 7 | 2 | 284 |
| 2 | (France) TDS Racing | 4 | 6 | Ret | Ret | 3 | 7 | Ret | 3 | 7 | 7 | Ret | 7 | Ret | 7 | 284 |
| 3 | (Belgium) Boutsen Energy Racing | 5 | 4 | 3 | 3 | 6 | 5 | 8 | 9 | 5 | 4 | 3 | 6 | 6 | 4 | 190 |
| 3 | (Belgium) Boutsen Energy Racing | Ret | 8 | 11 | Ret | 9 | 6 | 9 | 11 | 6 | 5 | 5 | 11 | 16 | 10 | 190 |
| 4 | (France) Team Lompech Sport | 9 | 3 | 2 | 2 | 4 | 2 | 5 | 6 | 4 | 12 | 2 | 3 | 8 | 6 | 176 |
| 4 | (France) Team Lompech Sport | Ret | 12 | 10 | 10 | 12 | 10 | 7 | 8 | 13 | Ret | 10 | 14 | Ret | Ret | 176 |
| 5 | (Spain) PujolaRacing | 10 | 11 | 9 | 6 | 18 | Ret | 6 | Ret | 10 | 8 | 7 | 8 | 4 | 3 | 64 |
| 6 | (Netherlands) Equipe Verschuur | Ret | 10 | Ret | 7 | 7 | 8 | 15 | DSQ | 11 | 13 | 12 | 9 | 2 | 15 | 17 |
| 6 | (Netherlands) Equipe Verschuur | | | Ret | 16 | 11 | 12 | | | 15 | 16 | Ret | 13 | Ret | Ret | 17 |
| 7 | (Italy) Brixia Horse Power | 11 | 14 | 5 | 14 | 15 | 15 | Ret | Ret | 17 | 14 | 13 | 18 | 14 | 14 | 10 |
| 7 | (Italy) Brixia Horse Power | | | | | | | DNS | DNS | | | | | | | 10 |
| 8 | (Germany) AFK Motorsport | Ret | 16 | 8 | 12 | 13 | 13 | 16 | 14 | 14 | 15 | 11 | 16 | Ret | Ret | 4 |
| 9 | (Portugal) Algarve Pro Racing Team | | | Ret | 13 | 17 | Ret | 12 | Ret | 17 | NC | Ret | 17 | 13 | 11 | 1 |
| 10 | (United Arab Emirates) Blue Jumeirah Team | 12 | 15 | 12 | 15 | Ret | Ret | 14 | 13 | 18 | 17 | 15 | 19 | 15 | 13 | 0 |
| Pos | Team | ALC (Spain) | | SPA (Belgium) | | NÜR (Germany) | | HUN (Hungary) | | SIL (United Kingdom) | | LEC (France) | | CAT (Spain) | | Points |

| Colour | Result |
|---|---|
| Gold | Winner |
| Silver | Second place |
| Bronze | Third place |
| Green | Points classification |
| Blue | Non-points classification |
| Blue | Non-classified finish (NC) |
| Purple | Retired, not classified (Ret) |
| Red | Did not qualify (DNQ) |
| Red | Did not pre-qualify (DNPQ) |
| Black | Disqualified (DSQ) |
| White | Did not start (DNS) |
| White | Withdrew (WD) |
| White | Race cancelled (C) |
| Blank | Did not practice (DNP) |
| Blank | Did not arrive (DNA) |
| Blank | Excluded (EX) |

=== Gentleman Drivers' Championship ===
| Pos | Driver | ALC (Spain) | | SPA (Belgium) | | NÜR (Germany) | | HUN (Hungary) | | SIL (United Kingdom) | | LEC (France) | | CAT (Spain) | | Points |
|---|---|---|---|---|---|---|---|---|---|---|---|---|---|---|---|---|
| 1 | (Belgium) David Dermont | 4 | 5 | DNS | 4 | 3 | 4 | 3 | 3 | 7 | 7 | Ret | 7 | 7 | 2 | 276 |
| 2 | (Netherlands) Wim Beelen | 6 | 7 | Ret | 8 | 8 | 11 | 4 | 5 | 8 | 6 | Ret | 4 | 5 | Ret | 200 |
| 3 | (Spain) Toni Forne | 10 | 11 | 9 | 6 | 18 | Ret | 6 | Ret | 10 | 8 | 7 | 8 | 4 | 3 | 182 |
| 4 | (Netherlands) Jeroen Schothorst | 8 | Ret | 7 | 9 | 10 | 9 | 11 | 10 | Ret | 10 | 9 | 12 | 10 | 8 | 160 |
| 5 | (France) Jean-Charles Miginiac | 9 | 12 | 10 | 10 | 12 | 10 | 7 | 8 | 13 | 12 | 10 | 14 | 8 | Ret | 142 |
| 6 | (Italy) Enrico Bettera | Ret | | | 11 | | 14 | | 12 | 12 | | 8 | 10 | 12 | | 72 |
| 7 | (Germany) Oliver Freymuth | Ret | 16 | 8 | 12 | 13 | 13 | 16 | 14 | 14 | 15 | 11 | 16 | Ret | Ret | 72 |
| 8 | (Italy) Navajo | | 13 | 6 | | 16 | | 13 | | | 11 | 14 | Ret | | 12 | 71 |
| 9 | (Spain) Rafael Unzurrunzaga | 12 | 15 | 12 | 15 | Ret | Ret | 14 | 13 | 18 | 17 | 15 | 19 | 15 | 13 | 49 |
| 10 | (Italy) Angelo Baiguera | 11 | 14 | | 14 | | 15 | Ret | Ret | 17 | 14 | 13 | 18 | 14 | | 43 |
| 11 | (United Kingdom) Michael Munemann | | | Ret | 13 | 17 | Ret | 12 | Ret | 16 | NC | Ret | 17 | 13 | 11 | 42 |
| 12 | (Netherlands) Wilko Becker | | | | | 11 | 12 | | | | | | | | | 22 |
| 13 | (Netherlands) Peter Peters | | | Ret | 7 | | | 15 | DSQ | | | | | | | 17 |
| 14 | (Netherlands) Steven Gijsen | Ret | 10 | Ret | 16 | Ret | Ret | | | | | | | | | 15 |
Guest drivers ineligible for points
| | (Sweden) Richard Kressner | | | | | | | | | 11 | 16 | Ret | 13 | | | 0 |
| | (Italy) Andrea Baiguera | | | | | | | | | | | | | | 14 | 0 |
| Pos | Driver | ALC (Spain) | | SPA (Belgium) | | NÜR (Germany) | | HUN (Hungary) | | SIL (United Kingdom) | | LEC (France) | | CAT (Spain) | | Points |

| Colour | Result |
|---|---|
| Gold | Winner |
| Silver | Second place |
| Bronze | Third place |
| Green | Points classification |
| Blue | Non-points classification |
| Blue | Non-classified finish (NC) |
| Purple | Retired, not classified (Ret) |
| Red | Did not qualify (DNQ) |
| Red | Did not pre-qualify (DNPQ) |
| Black | Disqualified (DSQ) |
| White | Did not start (DNS) |
| White | Withdrew (WD) |
| White | Race cancelled (C) |
| Blank | Did not practice (DNP) |
| Blank | Did not arrive (DNA) |
| Blank | Excluded (EX) |
