= Renault Sport Series =

Single-Seater Racing Championship

- Category: Eurocup Formula Renault 2.0; Renault Sport Trophy
- Country: Europe
- Inaugural season: 2005
- Folded: 2016
- Constructors: Renault
- Engine suppliers: Renault
- Tyre suppliers: Michelin
- Official website: Official website

The Renault Sport Series (formerly known as World Series by Renault) was a motor racing series. The series latterly consisted of the Eurocup Formula Renault 2.0, and used to contain the Renault Sport Trophy and the Formula Renault 3.5 Series. The F4 Eurocup 1.6 was made part of the World Series in 2010, but was then folded for 2011. The flagship for the Renault Sport Series from its beginning to 2015 was the Formula Renault 3.5 Series (often referred to as simply World Series by Renault or simply WSR). It became the Formula V8 3.5 in 2016, when Renault Sport retired its backing. In 2020 Eurocup Formula Renault 2.0 folded into the Formula Regional European Championship.

== History ==
Renault started the Formula Renault V6 Eurocup in 2003, as a support series in Eurosport's Super Racing Weekends (ETCC and FIA GT Championship). The series ran with Tatuus chassis and a Nissan 3.5 L V6 engine.

In 2005, Renault left the Super Racing Weekend and started the World Series by Renault and the Formula Renault 3.5 Series, merging both the World Series by Nissan (whose engine contract had finished) and Renault V6 Eurocup. The Dallara chassis was retained, while the Renault V6 was improved to 425 PS. Formula Renault 2.0 Eurocup and the Eurocup Mégane Trophy also joined the series in 2005 to support the main FR3.5 series.

At the end of July 2015, Renault Sport announced it would be withdrawing its backing to the Formula Renault 3.5 from 2016 onwards, handing the control of the series to co-organiser RPM. However, Renault Sport also said it would continue the Renault Sport Series with the Renault Sport Trophy and the Formula Renault 2.0 Eurocup.

== Champions ==
=== Former series ===
==== Eurocup Formula Renault 2.0 ====
| Season | Champion | Team Champion |
|---|---|---|
| 2005 | (Japan) Kamui Kobayashi | (France) SG Formula |
| 2006 | (Portugal) Filipe Albuquerque | (Italy) JD Motorsport |
| 2007 | (New Zealand) Brendon Hartley | (Spain) Epsilon RedBull |
| 2008 | (Finland) Valtteri Bottas | (France) SG Formula |
| 2009 | (Spain) Albert Costa | (Spain) Epsilon Euskadi |
| 2010 | (Estonia) Kevin Korjus | (France) Tech 1 Racing |
| 2011 | (Netherlands) Robin Frijns | (Finland) Koiranen Motorsport |
| 2012 | (Belgium) Stoffel Vandoorne | (Germany) Josef Kaufmann Racing |
| 2013 | (France) Pierre Gasly | (France) Tech 1 Racing |
| 2014 | (Netherlands) Nyck de Vries | (Finland) Koiranen GP |
| 2015 | (United Kingdom) Jack Aitken | (Germany) Josef Kaufmann Racing |
| 2016 | (United Kingdom) Lando Norris | (Germany) Josef Kaufmann Racing |
| 2017 | (France) Sacha Fenestraz | (France) R-ace GP |
| 2018 | (United Kingdom) Max Fewtrell | (France) R-ace GP |
| 2019 | (United Kingdom) Oscar Piastri (Note: Oscar Piastri is an Australian racing driver, despite being listed as Australian in entry list he raced under British racing license, with British flag raised above the podium and British anthem played after his wins.) | (France) R-ace GP |
| 2020 | (France) Victor Martins | (France) ART Grand Prix |

=== Formula Renault 3.5 Series ===
| Season | Champion | Team Champion |
|---|---|---|
| 2005 | (Poland) Robert Kubica | (Spain) Epsilon Euskadi |
| 2006 | (Sweden) Alx Danielsson | (Austria) Interwetten.com |
| 2007 | (Portugal) Álvaro Parente | (France) Tech 1 Racing |
| 2008 | (Netherlands) Giedo van der Garde | (France) Tech 1 Racing |
| 2009 | (Belgium) Bertrand Baguette | (Portugal) International DracoRacing |
| 2010 | (Russia) Mikhail Aleshin | (France) Tech 1 Racing |
| 2011 | (Canada) Robert Wickens | (United Kingdom) Carlin |
| 2012 | (Netherlands) Robin Frijns | (France) Tech 1 Racing |
| 2013 | (Denmark) Kevin Magnussen | (France) DAMS |
| 2014 | (Spain) Carlos Sainz Jr. | (France) DAMS |
| 2015 | (United Kingdom) Oliver Rowland | (United Kingdom) Fortec Motorsports |

==== Eurocup Mégane Trophy ====
| Season | Champion | Team Champion |
|---|---|---|
| 2005 | (Belgium) Jan Heylen | Racing for Belgium |
| 2006 | (Netherlands) Jaap van Lagen | (France) Tech 1 Racing |
| 2007 | (Portugal) Pedro Petiz | (France) Tech 1 Racing |
| 2008 | (France) Michaël Rossi | (France) Tech 1 Racing |
| 2009 | (Netherlands) Mike Verschuur | (France) TDS Racing |
| 2010 | (Netherlands) Nick Catsburg | (France) TDS Racing |
| 2011 | (Switzerland) Stefano Comini | (Italy) Oregon Team |
| 2012 | (Spain) Albert Costa | (Italy) Oregon Team |
| 2013 | (Italy) Mirko Bortolotti | (Italy) Oregon Team |

=== F4 Eurocup 1.6 ===
| Season | Champion |
|---|---|
| 2010 | (Belgium) Stoffel Vandoorne |

=== Eurocup Clio ===
| Season | Champion |
|---|---|
| 2011 | (France) Nicolas Milan |
| 2012 | (Spain) Oscar Nogués |
| 2013 | (United Kingdom) Josh Files |
| 2014 | (Spain) Oscar Nogués |

==== Renault Sport Trophy ====
| Season | Endurance Champion | Elite/Pro Champion | Prestige/Am Champion | Team Champion |
|---|---|---|---|---|
| 2015 | (Italy) Dario Capitanio (Italy) David Fumanelli | (France) Andrea Pizzitola | (Italy) Dario Capitanio | (Italy) Oregon Team |
| 2016 | (Finland) Markus Palttala (Germany) Fabian Schiller | (Netherlands) Pieter Schothorst | (Germany) Fabian Schiller | (Spain) Team Marc VDS EG 0,0 |
