= 2009 Eurocup Mégane Trophy =

Seasons
- ← 2008 2010 →

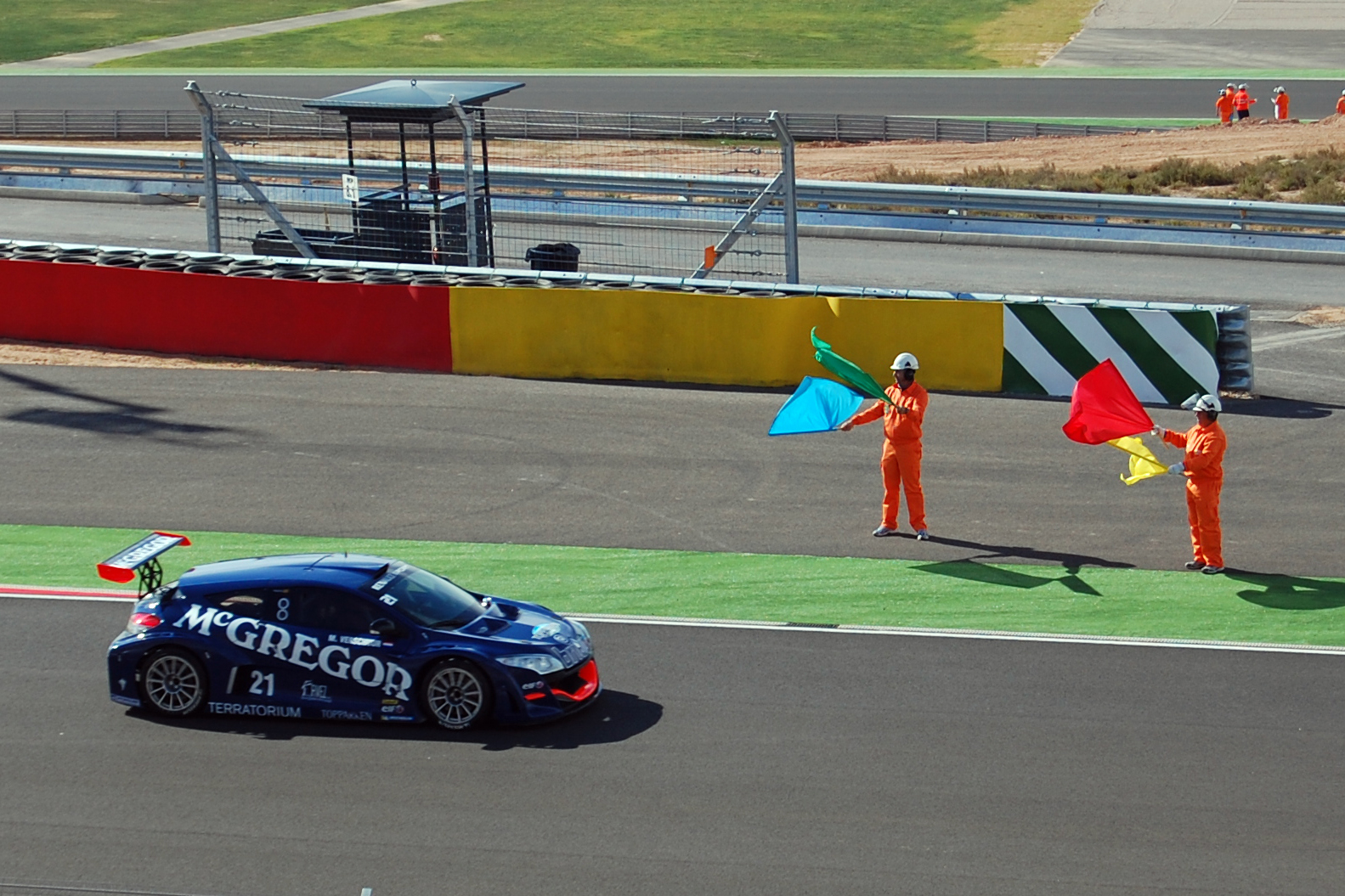
Mike Verschuur won the title at the final round at the Ciudad del Motor de Aragón.

The 2009 Eurocup Mégane Trophy season was the fifth Eurocup Mégane Trophy season. The season began at Circuit de Catalunya on 18 April and finished at the Ciudad del Motor de Aragón on 25 October, after seven rounds and fourteen races. Mike Verschuur won the title, having battled Jonathan Hirschi for the entire campaign.

== Teams and drivers ==
Team	#	Drivers	Class	Rounds
(France) Tech 1 Racing	1	(France) Antony Tardieu		All
(France) Tech 1 Racing	2	(France) Matthieu Cheruy		All
(France) Tech 1 Racing	3	(Netherlands) Nick Catsburg		All
(Belgium) Boutsen Energy Racing	4	(Belgium) David Dermont		All
(Belgium) Boutsen Energy Racing	5	(France) Dimitri Enjalbert		1, 3–7
(Belgium) Boutsen Energy Racing	5	(France) Michaël Rossi		2
(Belgium) Boutsen Energy Racing	26	(France) Marlene Broggi		All
(Belgium) Boutsen Energy Racing	26	(France) Marguerite Laffite		All
(France) TDS Racing	6	(Switzerland) Jonathan Hirschi		All
(France) TDS Racing	7	(France) Jean-Philippe Madonia	G	All
(France) TDS Racing	8	(France) Pierre Thiriet		All
(France) Team Lompech Sport	9	(France) Jean-Charles Miginiac	G	All
(France) Team Lompech Sport	10	(Belgium) Bernard Delhez	G	All
(France) Team Lompech Sport	11	(France) Fabrice Walfisch		All
(Netherlands) Equipe Verschuur	14	(Netherlands) Bernhard ten Brinke		1–4
(Netherlands) Equipe Verschuur	14	(Netherlands) Pieter Schothorst		5–6
(Netherlands) Equipe Verschuur	14	(Netherlands) Bas Schothorst		7
(Netherlands) Equipe Verschuur	15	(Netherlands) Wim Beelen		All
(Netherlands) Verschuur Autosport	16	(Netherlands) Hoevert Vos	G	All
(Netherlands) Verschuur Autosport	17	(Netherlands) Harrie Kolen	G	All
(Spain) Blue Jumeirah Team	18	(Spain) Rafael Unzurrunzaga	G	All
(Netherlands) McGregor by Equipe Verschuur	19	(Netherlands) Jeroen Schothorst	G	All
(Netherlands) McGregor by Equipe Verschuur	21	(Netherlands) Mike Verschuur		All
(Italy) Oregon Team	23	(Italy) Giovanni Longo	G	1, 5–7
(Italy) Oregon Team	23	(Italy) Giovanni Seminara	G	2
(Italy) Oregon Team	23	(Italy) Giorgio Pantano		3–4
(Italy) Oregon Team	24	(Switzerland) Pierre Hirschi	G	All
(Italy) Oregon Team	25	(Italy) Lorenzo Bontempelli	G	2–3
(Italy) Oregon Team	25	(Italy) Secondo Gallia	G	5–7
(Italy) Oregon Team	25	(Italy) Giovanni Seminara	G	7
(Italy) Brixia Autosport	73	(Italy) Angelo Baiguera	G	All

Icon	Class
G	Gentleman Driver

== Calendar ==
=== Race calendar and results ===
Round		Location	Circuit	Date	Pole position	Fastest lap	Winning driver	Winning team
1	R1	Montmeló, Spain	Circuit de Catalunya	18 April	(Netherlands) Mike Verschuur	(Switzerland) Jonathan Hirschi	(Switzerland) Jonathan Hirschi	(France) TDS Racing
1	R2	Montmeló, Spain	Circuit de Catalunya	19 April	(France) Dimitri Enjalbert	(Netherlands) Mike Verschuur	(Netherlands) Mike Verschuur	(Netherlands) McGregor by Equipe Verschuur
2	R1	Spa, Belgium	Circuit de Spa-Francorchamps	2 May	(Switzerland) Jonathan Hirschi	(Netherlands) Mike Verschuur	(Switzerland) Jonathan Hirschi	(France) TDS Racing
2	R2	Spa, Belgium	Circuit de Spa-Francorchamps	3 May	(Switzerland) Jonathan Hirschi	(France) Michaël Rossi	(Switzerland) Jonathan Hirschi	(France) TDS Racing
3	R1	Mogyoród, Hungary	Hungaroring	13 June	(Netherlands) Mike Verschuur	(France) Dimitri Enjalbert	(France) Dimitri Enjalbert	(Belgium) Boutsen Energy Racing
3	R2	Mogyoród, Hungary	Hungaroring	14 June	(Netherlands) Mike Verschuur	(Netherlands) Mike Verschuur	(France) Dimitri Enjalbert	(Belgium) Boutsen Energy Racing
4	R1	Silverstone, United Kingdom	Silverstone Circuit	4 July	(France) Dimitri Enjalbert	(Switzerland) Jonathan Hirschi	(France) Dimitri Enjalbert	(Belgium) Boutsen Energy Racing
4	R2	Silverstone, United Kingdom	Silverstone Circuit	5 July	(France) Dimitri Enjalbert	(France) Dimitri Enjalbert	(France) Dimitri Enjalbert	(Belgium) Boutsen Energy Racing
5	R1	Le Mans, France	Bugatti Circuit	18 July	(France) Dimitri Enjalbert	(Netherlands) Mike Verschuur	(Switzerland) Jonathan Hirschi	(France) TDS Racing
5	R2	Le Mans, France	Bugatti Circuit	19 July	(France) Dimitri Enjalbert	(France) Dimitri Enjalbert	(France) Dimitri Enjalbert	(Belgium) Boutsen Energy Racing
6	R1	Nürburg, Germany	Nürburgring	19 September	(Netherlands) Mike Verschuur	(France) Dimitri Enjalbert	(France) Dimitri Enjalbert	(Belgium) Boutsen Energy Racing
6	R2	Nürburg, Germany	Nürburgring	20 September	(France) Dimitri Enjalbert	(Netherlands) Mike Verschuur	(France) Dimitri Enjalbert	(Belgium) Boutsen Energy Racing
7	R1	Alcañiz, Spain	Ciudad del Motor de Aragón	24 October	(Netherlands) Mike Verschuur	(France) Dimitri Enjalbert	(Netherlands) Mike Verschuur	(Netherlands) McGregor by Equipe Verschuur
7	R2	Alcañiz, Spain	Ciudad del Motor de Aragón	25 October	(Netherlands) Mike Verschuur	(France) Fabrice Walfisch	(Netherlands) Mike Verschuur	(Netherlands) McGregor by Equipe Verschuur

== Championship standings ==
Pos	Driver	CAT (Spain)		SPA (Belgium)		HUN (Hungary)		SIL (United Kingdom)		BUG (France)		NÜR (Germany)		ALC (Spain)		Points
1	(Netherlands) Mike Verschuur	**3**	1	2	DNS	**2**	**2**	2	2	2	4	**2**	2	**1**	**1**	163
2	(Switzerland) Jonathan Hirschi	1	2	**1**	**1**	3	DSQ	4	6	1	2	Ret	3	4	4	136
3	(France) Dimitri Enjalbert	Ret	**10**			1	1	**1**	**1**	**DNS**	**1**	1	**1**	2	Ret	120
4	(France) Fabrice Walfisch	7	6	6	Ret	5	7	3	4	5	3	Ret	4	3	3	88
5	(France) Pierre Thiriet	4	7	5	2	Ret	9	7	Ret	9	7	3	5	5	Ret	65
6	(France) Jean-Philippe Madonia	2	5	4	Ret	13	10	Ret	13	3	5	4	11	8	8	59
7	(France) Matthieu Cheruy	5	4	3	8	12	Ret	6	7	DNS	12	6	10	6	5	56
8	(France) Antony Tardieu	6	11	8	5	9	8	Ret	8	DNS	Ret	7	6	7	6	41
9	(Netherlands) Bernhard ten Brinke	14	3	7	4	4	6	9	9							39
10	(Netherlands) Nick Catsburg	8	8	Ret	Ret	6	3	Ret	5	4	Ret	Ret	Ret	Ret	Ret	35
11	(Italy) Giorgio Pantano					7	4	5	3							28
12	(Belgium) David Dermont	Ret	19	9	6	8	5	8	10	7	Ret	Ret	Ret	Ret	Ret	24
13	(Netherlands) Hoevert Vos	9	13	10	Ret	11	11	Ret	11	10	6	5	7	Ret	Ret	20
14	(Netherlands) Wim Beelen	Ret	Ret	Ret	Ret	10	13	10	12	15	Ret	9	8	Ret	7	13
15	(France) Michaël Rossi			Ret	3											10
16	(Switzerland) Pierre Hirschi	10	9	14	Ret	19	16	16	Ret	12	16	Ret	13	9	9	8
17	(France) Marguerite Laffite	16			12	21			16	6		14			10	7
18	(Belgium) Bernard Delhez	13	12	12	Ret	18	18	11	14	11	9	10	12	11	12	5
19	(Italy) Lorenzo Bontempelli			11	7	14	12									4
20	(France) Jean-Charles Miginiac	11	14	13	10	15	15	17	17	Ret	8	12	Ret	DNS	13	4
21	(Netherlands) Jeroen Schothorst	15	20	15	9	16	14	13	15	Ret	10	16	15	16	Ret	3
22	(Netherlands) Harrie Kolen	12	16	Ret	Ret	NC	19	14	18	14	11	11	Ret	12	11	2
23	(France) Marlene Broggi		17	18†			17	12			13		16	10		1
24	(Italy) Angelo Baiguera	17	15	Ret	11	17	21	15	Ret	16	15	17	17	14	14	0
25	(Spain) Rafael Unzurrunzaga	18	18	17	13	20	20	Ret	19	17	18	15	Ret	15	15	0
26	(Italy) Giovanni Longo	NC	21							Ret	19	18	18	17	16	0
27	(Italy) Giovanni Seminara			16	Ret										Ret	0
guest drivers ineligible for points
	(Netherlands) Bas Schothorst													Ret	2	0
	(Netherlands) Pieter Schothorst									8	14	8	9			0
	(Italy) Secondo Gallia									13	17	13	14	13		0
Pos	Driver	CAT (Spain)		SPA (Belgium)		HUN (Hungary)		SIL (United Kingdom)		BUG (France)		NÜR (Germany)		ALC (Spain)		Points

Colour	Result
Gold	Winner
Silver	Second place
Bronze	Third place
Green	Points classification
Blue	Non-points classification
Blue	Non-classified finish (NC)
Purple	Retired, not classified (Ret)
Red	Did not qualify (DNQ)
Red	Did not pre-qualify (DNPQ)
Black	Disqualified (DSQ)
White	Did not start (DNS)
White	Withdrew (WD)
White	Race cancelled (C)
Blank	Did not practice (DNP)
Blank	Did not arrive (DNA)
Blank	Excluded (EX)

**Bold** – Pole
Italics – Fastest Lap

Position	1st	2nd	3rd	4th	5th	6th	7th	8th	9th	10th	Pole
Points	15	12	10	8	6	5	4	3	2	1	1
