= Dimitri Enjalbert =

French racing driver (born 1985)

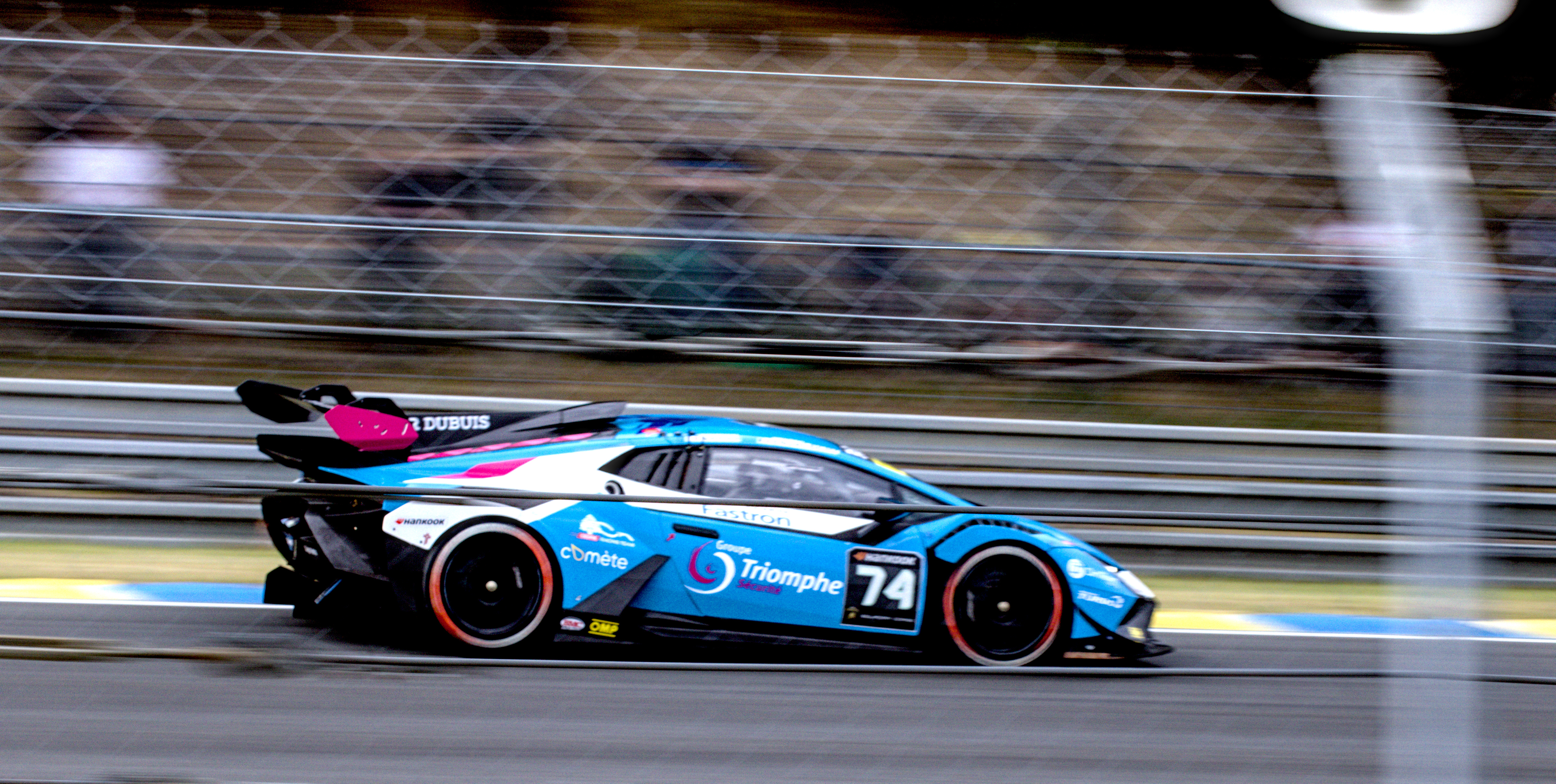
- Enjalbert in 2024
- Nationality: (France) French
- Born: 24 May 1985 (age 41) Paris, France
- Categorisation: FIA Gold (until 2011); FIA Silver (2012–)

Dimitri Enjalbert (born 24 May 1985) is a French racing driver who competes in the European Endurance Prototype Cup for BDR Competition.

A graduate of the Renault one-make ranks, Enjalbert won overall on his FIA GT3 debut in 2009 and his LMP2 debut in 2012, but has spent much of his later career in smaller series, such as Lamborghini Super Trofeo Europe.

== Career ==
Enjalbert competed in karts from 1998 to 2003, before entering the Championnat de France Formule Campus in 2004. Moving to Renault Clio Cup France for the next two seasons, Enjalbert most notably was runner-up in the 2006 edition with a win to his name.

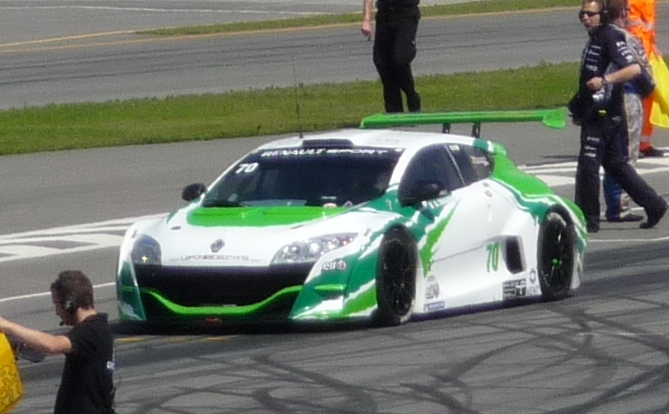
Enjalbert on the grid at Brno during the 2010 Eurocup Mégane Trophy.

In 2007, Enjalbert joined Tech 1 Racing to enter the Eurocup Mégane Trophy, a season in which he took wins at the Nürburgring and Barcelona to secure runner-up honours. In 2008, Enjalbert won at Le Mans and both Barcelona races to end the year third overall. Switching to Boutsen Energy Racing for 2009, Enjalbert won 7 of the 11 races he started en route to another third-place finish. In parallel, Enjalbert raced with the team in the Formula Le Mans Cup, where he took two poles and helped Gary Chalandon to three podiums. He also won the FIA GT3 European Championship season opener at Silverstone in AutoGT Racing's Morgan Aero SuperSports GT3, alongside Johan-Boris Scheier. Boutsen retained Enjalbert for the 2010 Eurocup Mégane Trophy, where he slipped to fifth in the standings with a lone win at Spa.

At the start of 2011, Enjalbert joined Team LMP Motorsport to race in the FFSA GT Championship and the FIA GT3 European Championship, as well as taking three podiums in the first two rounds of the Eurocup Mégane Trophy for Team Lompech Sport. In late May, Enjalbert joined Corvette-fielding DKR Engineering to compete in three rounds of the FIA GT1 World Championship with Michaël Rossi, before winning on his Lamborghini Super Trofeo Europe debut for Bonaldi Motorsport at Barcelona. Enjalbert went full-time in Lamborghini Super Trofeo Europe for 2012, driving for Touring Auto 2000 SRL with Bernard Delhez, and took wins at Spa and the Nürburgring to finish runner-up in Pro-Am. Enjalbert also competed in the NASCAR-sanctioned Racecar Euro Series, scoring two Elite class podiums. In July, Enjalbert made an ELMS cameo at Donington Park and won overall on his LMP2 debut for OAK Racing, partnering Bertrand Baguette and Olivier Pla.

After one-off appearances for BMW-fielding DKR Engineering at the 24 Hours of Spa and the European Le Mans Series in 2013, Enjalbert came fourth in Lamborghini Super Trofeo Europe's Pro-Am class in 2014, partnering Mikko Eskelinen at Team Luxemburg. Enjalbert then began a long association with IDEC Sport Racing in 2015, as he entered V de V Challenge Endurance and won at Barcelona to take seventh in the Scratch class points. Enjalbert also made two appearances in the 24H Series, winning both in the 997 class. Enjalbert then assisted IDEC's graduation to LMP2 for 2016, as he guided team owner Patrice Lafargue and his son Paul in the European Le Mans Series, placing 18th with a best finish of sixth at Estoril,

Remaining with IDEC Sport for five more seasons, Enjalbert steered a Mercedes-AMG GT3 to three A6-Pro podiums in the 24H Series until 2019, before moving to the Le Mans Cup's LMP3 class for 2020 and 2021, with a best result of eighth at Barcelona. Enjalbert also stepped down to the Ligier European Series for Monza, where he and Patrice Lafargue won race one in JS P4 for Les Deux Arbres. Enjalbert then ran two full seasons of LES for Pegasus Racing, but was unable to add to his win tally. Driving alongside Anthony Nahra, Enjalbert scored three JS P4 podiums in 2022, including second place at Le Mans, and one in 2023.

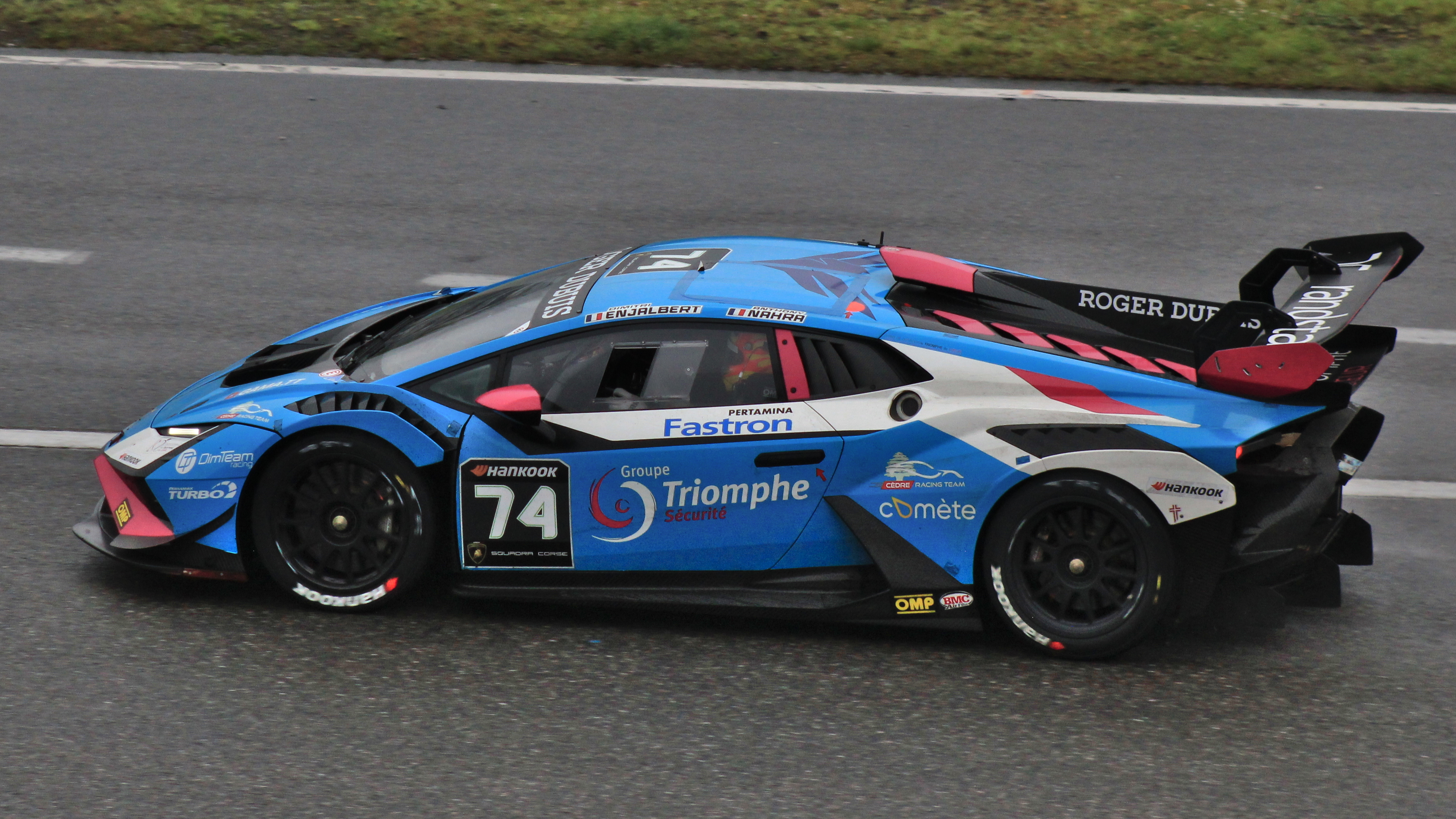
Enjalbert driving in Lamborghini Super Trofeo Europe at the Nürburgring in 2024.

In 2024, Enjalbert and Nahra moved to Lamborghini Super Trofeo Europe with Pegasus Racing. After two rounds in the Pro class, the pair switched to Pro-Am for the rest of the season, and took a class win at Le Mans. In 2025, Enjalbert and Nahra moved teams to Amaury Bonduel's BDR Competition by Grupo Prom, finishing third in the Pro-Am standings with six podiums to their name. In 2026, Enjalbert returned to prototype racing with BDR Competition, entering the NP02-spec European Endurance Prototype Cup with Nahra and a rotating cast of drivers.

== Coaching ==
Enjalbert founded Dim Team Racing in 2003, and is a state-certified driving coach and instructor on asphalt and ice since 2007.

== Racing record ==
=== Racing career summary ===
Season	Series	Team	Races	Wins	Poles	F/Laps	Podiums	Points	Position
2004	Championnat de France Formule Campus								
2005	Renault Clio Cup France	Energy Racing	14	0	1	0	0	40	11th
2006	Renault Clio Cup France	Energy Racing	13	1	0	1	6	109	**2nd**
2007	Eurocup Mégane Trophy	Tech 1 Racing	14	2	3	6	7	126	**2nd**
2008	Eurocup Mégane Trophy	Tech 1 Racing	14	3	4	6	9	126	**3rd**
2009	Eurocup Mégane Trophy	Boutsen Energy Racing	11	7	6	5	8	120	**3rd**
2009	FIA GT3 European Championship	AutoGT Racing	8	1	0	0	1	13.5	16th
2009	Formula Le Mans Cup	Boutsen Energy Racing	6	0	2	1	3	67	9th
2010	Eurocup Mégane Trophy	Boutsen Energy Racing	13	1	0	0	3	67	5th
2011	FFSA GT Championship	Team LMP Motorsport	2	0	0	0	0		
2011	Eurocup Mégane Trophy	Team Lompech Sport	4	0	0	0	3	51	10th
2011	FIA GT3 European Championship	Team LMP Motorsport	4	0	0	0	0	0	46th
2011	FIA GT1 World Championship	DKR Engineering	6	0	0	0	0	7	28th
2011	Lamborghini Super Trofeo Europe – Pro	Bonaldi Motorsport	3	1	0	0	1	31	4th
2011	International GT Open – Pro-Am	Kessel Racing	2	0	0	0	0	0	NC†
2012	Lamborghini Super Trofeo Europe – Pro-Am	Touring Auto 2000 SRL	11	2	1	2	8	119	**2nd**
2012	Racecar Euro Series – Elite		8	0	0	0	2	272	18th
2012	Racecar Euro Series – Open		1	0	0	0	0		
2012	European Le Mans Series – LMP2	OAK Racing	1	1	0	0	1	25	7th
2013	Blancpain Endurance Series – Pro-Am	DKR Engineering	1	0	0	0	0	0	NC
2013	European Le Mans Series – GTC	DKR Engineering	1	0	0	0	0	8	14th
2014	Lamborghini Super Trofeo Europe – Pro-Am	Automobili Lamborghini Racing Team Luxemburg	12	0	0	1	5	87	4th
2014	Lamborghini Super Trofeo World Finals – Pro-Am	Automobili Lamborghini Racing Team Luxemburg	2	0	0	0	1		
2015	V de V Challenge Endurance Proto – Scratch	IDEC Sport Racing	6	1	0	0	4	108.5	7th
2015	V de V Challenge Endurance GT/Tourisme		1	0	0	0	0		
2015	24H Series – 997	Ruffier Racing	2	2	0	0	2	60	4th
2016	European Le Mans Series – LMP2	IDEC Sport Racing	5	0	0	0	0	19	18th
2016	V de V Challenge Endurance Moderne – Proto		4	0	0	0	1	51.5	21st
2016	V de V Challenge Endurance GT/Tourisme		1	0	0	0	0		
2016	24H Series – A6-Am	IDEC Sport Racing	2	0	0	0	0		
2017	24H Series – A6-Pro	IDEC Sport Racing	5	0	0	0	1		
2018	24H GT Series Europe – A6-Pro	IDEC Sport Racing	4	0	0	0	2		
2019	24H GT Series Europe – A6	IDEC Sport Racing	3	0	0	0	0	30	10th
2020	Le Mans Cup – LMP3	IDEC Sport	2	0	0	0	0	0	NC†
2021	Le Mans Cup – LMP3	IDEC Sport	7	0	0	0	0	6	24th
2021	Ligier European Series – JS P4	Les Deux Arbres	2	1	0	0	1	37	8th
2022	Ligier European Series – JS P4	Pegasus Racing	12	0	0	1	3	100	6th
2023	Ligier European Series – JS P4	Pegasus Racing	11	0	0	0	1	73	7th
2024	Lamborghini Super Trofeo Europe – Pro	Pegasus Racing	4	0	0	0	0	0	NC
2024	Lamborghini Super Trofeo Europe – Pro-Am	Pegasus Racing	8	1	1	0	3	52	10th
2024	Lamborghini Super Trofeo World Finals – Pro-Am	Pegasus Racing	2	0	0	0	0	3	14th
2025	Lamborghini Super Trofeo Europe – Pro-Am	BDR Competition by Grupo Prom	12	0	2	0	6	91	**3rd**
2025	Lamborghini Super Trofeo World Finals – Pro-Am	BDR Competition by Grupo Prom	2	0	0	0	0	12	5th
2026	European Endurance Prototype Cup	BDR Competition						*	*

^{†} As Enjalbert was a guest driver, he was ineligible to score points.

=== Complete Eurocup Mégane Trophy results ===
(key) (Races in bold indicate pole position) (Races in italics indicate fastest lap)

Year	Entrant	1	2	3	4	5	6	7	8	9	10	11	12	13	14	Rank	Points
2007	Tech 1 Racing	ZOL; 1; 2	**ZOL**; **2**; 2	**NÜR**; **1**; 1	**NÜR**; **2**; 3	HUN; 1 Ret	HUN; 2; 5	DON; 1 Ret	DON; 2; 2	MAG; 1; 5	MAG; 2; 4	EST; 1; 5	EST; 2; 2	CAT; 1; 1	CAT; 2; 10	2nd	126
2008	Tech 1 Racing	SPA; 1; 13	SPA; 2; 2	SIL; 1; 4	SIL; 2; 3	HUN; 1; 6	HUN; 2; 2	NÜR; 1 Ret	NÜR; 2; 3	**LMS**; **1**; 1	**LMS**; **2** Ret	EST; 1; 2	EST; 2; 3	**CAT**; **1**; 1	**CAT**; **2**; 1	3rd	126
2009	Boutsen Energy Racing	CAT; 1 Ret	**CAT**; **2**; 10	SPA; 1	SPA; 2	HUN; 1; 1	HUN; 2; 1	**SIL**; **1**; 1	**SIL**; **2**; 1	**LMS**; **1** DNS	**LMS**; **2**; 1	NÜR; 1; 1	**NÜR**; **2**; 1	ARA; 1; 2	ARA; 2 Ret	3rd	120
2010	Boutsen Energy Racing	SPA; 1 C	SPA; 2; 1	BRN; 1; 3	BRN; 2 Ret	MAG; 1 DSQ	MAG; 2; 5	HUN; 1; 7	HUN; 2; 5	HOC; 1; 5	HOC; 2 Ret	SIL; 1; 10	SIL; 2; 8	CAT; 1 Ret	CAT; 2; 2	5th	67
2011	Team Lompech Sport	ARA; 1 Ret	ARA; 2; 3	SPA; 1; 2	SPA; 2; 2	NÜR; 1	NÜR; 2	HUN; 1	HUN; 2	SIL; 1	SIL; 2	LEC; 1	LEC; 2	CAT; 1	CAT; 2	10th	51

=== Complete FIA GT3 European Championship results ===
(key) (Races in bold indicate pole position; races in italics indicate fastest lap)

Year	Entrant	Chassis	Engine	1	2	3	4	5	6	7	8	9	10	11	12	Pos.	Points
2009	AutoGT Racing	Morgan Aero SuperSports GT3	BMW 5.0 L V8	SIL; 1; 1	SIL; 2 Ret	ADR; 1 Ret	ADR; 2 DNS	OSC; 1 DNS	OSC; 2; 8	ALG; 1 Ret	ALG; 2 Ret	LEC; 1; 4	LEC; 2 Ret	ZOL; 1	ZOL; 2	16th	13.5
2011	Team LMP Motorsport	Aston Martin DBRS9	Aston Martin 6.0 L V12	ALG; 1; 15	ALG; 2; 15	SIL; 1; 26	SIL; 2 Ret	NAV; 1	NAV; 2	LEC; 1	LEC; 2	SLO; 1	SLO; 2	ZAN; 1	ZAN; 2	46th	0

=== Complete FIA GT1 World Championship results ===
Year	Team	Car	1	2	3	4	5	6	7	8	9	10	11	12	13	14	15	16	17	18	19	20	Pos.	Pts
2011	DKR Engineering	Lamborghini	ABU; QR	ABU; CR	ZOL; QR	ZOL; CR	ALG; QR	ALG; CR	SAC; QR	SAC; CR	SIL; QR; 9	SIL; CR; Ret	NAV; QR; 8	NAV; CR; 7	LEC; QR; 8	LEC; CR; 10	ORD; QR	ORD; CR	BEI; QR	BEI; CR	SAN; QR	SAN; CR	28th	7

=== Complete European Le Mans Series results ===
(key) (Races in bold indicate pole position; results in italics indicate fastest lap)

Year	Entrant	Class	Chassis	Engine	1	2	3	4	5	6	Rank	Points
2012	OAK Racing	LMP2	Morgan LMP2	Nissan VK45DE 4.5 L V8	LEC	DON; 1	PET				7th	25
2013	DKR Engineering	GTC	BMW Z4 GT3 (Spec 2011)	BMW P65B44 4.4 L V8	SIL	IMO	RBR	HUN	LEC; 6		14th	8
2016	IDEC Sport Racing	LMP2	Ligier JS P2	Nissan VK45DE 4.5 L V8	SIL; 7	IMO; Ret	RBR	LEC; 9	SPA; 8	EST; 6	18th	19

=== Complete GT World Challenge results ===
==== GT World Challenge Europe Endurance Cup ====
(Races in bold indicate pole position) (Races in italics indicate fastest lap)

Year	Team	Car	Class	1	2	3	4	5	6	7	Pos.	Points
2013	DKR Engineering	BMW Z4 GT3	Pro-Am	MNZ	SIL	LEC	SPA; 6H; Ret	SPA; 12H; Ret	SPA; 24H; Ret	NÜR	NC	0

=== Complete Le Mans Cup results ===
(key) (Races in bold indicate pole position; results in italics indicate fastest lap)

Year	Entrant	Class	Chassis	1	2	3	4	5	6	7	Rank	Points
2020	IDEC Sport	LMP3	Ligier JS P320	RIC	SPA	LEC	LMS; 1	LMS; 2	MNZ; Ret	POR; 12	NC†	0†
2021	IDEC Sport	LMP3	Ligier JS P320	BAR; 8	LEC; Ret	MNZ; Ret	LMS; 20	LMS; 12	SPA; 11	POR; 12	24th	6

=== Complete Ligier European Series results ===
(key) (Races in bold indicate pole position; results in italics indicate fastest lap)

Year	Entrant	Class	Chassis	1	2	3	4	5	6	7	8	9	10	11	12	Rank	Points
2021	Pegasus Racing	JS P4	Ligier JS P4	CAT; 1	CAT; 2	RBR; 1	RBR; 2	LEC; 1	LEC; 2	MNZ; 1; 1	MNZ; 2; 4	SPA; 1	SPA; 2	ALG; 1	ALG; 2	8th	37
2022	Pegasus Racing	JS P4	Ligier JS P4	LEC; 1; 5	LEC; 2; 5	IMO; 1; 4	IMO; 2; 3	LMS; 1; 2	LMS; 2 Ret	MNZ; 1 Ret	MNZ; 2; 8	SPA; 1; 3	SPA; 2 Ret	POR; 1; 8	POR; 2; 4	6th	100
2023	Pegasus Racing	JS P4	Ligier JS P4	CAT; 1; 7	CAT; 2; 4	LMS; 3	LEC; 1; 4	LEC; 2; 8	ARA; 1 Ret	ARA; 2 Ret	SPA; 1; 8	SPA; 2; 6	ALG; 1; 8	ALG; 2; 6		7th	73
