= 2010 Eurocup Mégane Trophy =

Seasons
- ← 2009 2011 →

The 2010 Eurocup Mégane Trophy season was the sixth Eurocup Mégane Trophy season. The season began at Circuit de Spa-Francorchamps on 1 May and finished at the Circuit de Catalunya on 10 October, after seven rounds and fourteen scheduled races. The races tally was reduced to thirteen, after the opening race of the championship was cancelled due to technical problems at Spa-Francorchamps, and was not rescheduled.

Eleven top-two finishes – including seven victories – from the thirteen races gave TDS Racing's Nick Catsburg the championship title, for the team's second drivers' championship crown in three seasons. Team-mate and twice race winner Pierre Thiriet finished 27 points behind Catsburg in second place, and Stefano Comini, a three-time winner, finished third in the standings. Dimitri Enjalbert was the other race winner, as he struggled to match his race-winning form of 2009, when he won seven times. As well as the drivers' championship, TDS Racing claimed the teams' championship due to the strong showings of Catsburg and Thiriet; the team scored almost double the points tally of runners-up Oregon Team, while third TDS driver Jean-Philippe Madonia won the championship for gentlemen drivers for the third successive season.

== Teams and drivers ==
| Team | # | Drivers | Class | Rounds |
|---|---|---|---|---|
| (France) TDS Racing | 1 | (France) Pierre Thiriet | | All |
| (France) TDS Racing | 2 | (France) Jean-Philippe Madonia | G | All |
| (France) TDS Racing | 3 | (Netherlands) Nick Catsburg | | All |
| (France) TDS Racing | 4 | (Belgium) David Dermont | | 5–7 |
| (Belgium) Boutsen Energy Racing | 4 | (Belgium) David Dermont | | 1–4 |
| (Belgium) Boutsen Energy Racing | 5 | (Belgium) Caroline Grifnée | | 1–6 |
| (Belgium) Boutsen Energy Racing | 5 | (France) Vito Rodrigues | | 1–6 |
| (Belgium) Boutsen Energy Racing | 6 | (Switzerland) Fabien Thuner | | All |
| (Belgium) Boutsen Energy Racing | 8 | (France) Renaud Derlot | | 5–7 |
| (Belgium) Boutsen Energy Racing | 70 | (France) Dimitri Enjalbert | | All |
| (Netherlands) McGregor by Equipe Verschuur | 7 | (Netherlands) Bas Schothorst | | All |
| (Netherlands) McGregor by Equipe Verschuur | 16 | (Netherlands) Hoevert Vos | G | All |
| (Netherlands) McGregor by Equipe Verschuur | 17 | (Netherlands) Harrie Kollen | G | All |
| (France) Team Lompech Sport | 9 | (France) Jean-Charles Miginiac | G | All |
| (France) Team Lompech Sport | 11 | (France) Sébastien Dhouailly | | All |
| (Netherlands) Equipe Verschuur | 14 | (Netherlands) Steven Gijsen | | All |
| (Netherlands) Equipe Verschuur | 15 | (Netherlands) Wim Beelen | | 1, 3–7 |
| (Netherlands) Equipe Verschuur | 15 | (Netherlands) Wilko Becker | G | 2 |
| (United Arab Emirates) Blue Jumeirah Team | 18 | (Spain) Rafael Unzurrunzaga | G | All |
| (Netherlands) McG Fashion by Equipe Verschuur | 19 | (Netherlands) Jeroen Schothorst | G | All |
| (Netherlands) McG Fashion by Equipe Verschuur | 21 | (Netherlands) Raymond Coronel | G | All |
| (Italy) Oregon Team | 23 | (Italy) Navajo | G | 1–3, 5–7 |
| (Italy) Oregon Team | 23 | (Italy) Navajo | G | 4 |
| (Italy) Oregon Team | 23 | (Italy) Giovanni Seminara | G | 4 |
| (Italy) Oregon Team | 24 | (Italy) Niccolò Nalio | | All |
| (Italy) Oregon Team | 25 | (Switzerland) Stefano Comini | | All |
| (Italy) Brixia Autosport | 73 | (Italy) Angelo Baiguera | G | All |

| Icon | Class |
|---|---|
| G | Gentleman Driver |

== Calendar ==
- The 2010 calendar was announced on 25 October 2009.

| Round | | Location | Circuit | Date | Pole position | Fastest lap | Winning driver | Winning team |
|---|---|---|---|---|---|---|---|---|
| 1 | R1 | Spa, Belgium | Circuit de Spa-Francorchamps | 1 May | (Netherlands) Nick Catsburg | race cancelled | | |
| 1 | R2 | Spa, Belgium | Circuit de Spa-Francorchamps | 2 May | (Netherlands) Nick Catsburg | (Switzerland) Stefano Comini | (France) Dimitri Enjalbert | (Belgium) Boutsen Energy Racing |
| 2 | R1 | Brno, Czech Republic | Masaryk Circuit | 5 June | (Netherlands) Nick Catsburg | (Netherlands) Bas Schothorst | (Switzerland) Stefano Comini | (Italy) Oregon Racing |
| 2 | R2 | Brno, Czech Republic | Masaryk Circuit | 6 June | (Switzerland) Stefano Comini | (Netherlands) Nick Catsburg | (Netherlands) Nick Catsburg | (France) TDS Racing |
| 3 | R1 | Magny-Cours, France | Circuit de Nevers Magny-Cours | 19 June | (Netherlands) Nick Catsburg | (Netherlands) Bas Schothorst | (Netherlands) Nick Catsburg | (France) TDS Racing |
| 3 | R2 | Magny-Cours, France | Circuit de Nevers Magny-Cours | 20 June | (Switzerland) Stefano Comini | (Netherlands) Nick Catsburg | (France) Pierre Thiriet | (France) TDS Racing |
| 4 | R1 | Mogyoród, Hungary | Hungaroring | 3 July | (Netherlands) Nick Catsburg | (Netherlands) Nick Catsburg | (France) Pierre Thiriet | (France) TDS Racing |
| 4 | R2 | Mogyoród, Hungary | Hungaroring | 4 July | (Netherlands) Nick Catsburg | (Netherlands) Nick Catsburg | (Netherlands) Nick Catsburg | (France) TDS Racing |
| 5 | R1 | Hockenheim, Germany | Hockenheimring | 4 September | (Netherlands) Nick Catsburg | (Netherlands) Hoevert Vos | (Netherlands) Nick Catsburg | (France) TDS Racing |
| 5 | R2 | Hockenheim, Germany | Hockenheimring | 5 September | (Switzerland) Stefano Comini | (Netherlands) Bas Schothorst | (Switzerland) Stefano Comini | (Italy) Oregon Racing |
| 6 | R1 | Silverstone, United Kingdom | Silverstone Circuit | 18 September | (Netherlands) Nick Catsburg | (Netherlands) Nick Catsburg | (Switzerland) Stefano Comini | (Italy) Oregon Racing |
| 6 | R2 | Silverstone, United Kingdom | Silverstone Circuit | 19 September | (Netherlands) Nick Catsburg | (Switzerland) Stefano Comini | (Netherlands) Nick Catsburg | (France) TDS Racing |
| 7 | R1 | Montmeló, Spain | Circuit de Catalunya | 9 October | (Switzerland) Stefano Comini | (Switzerland) Stefano Comini | (Netherlands) Nick Catsburg | (France) TDS Racing |
| 7 | R2 | Montmeló, Spain | Circuit de Catalunya | 10 October | (Netherlands) Nick Catsburg | (Netherlands) Nick Catsburg | (Netherlands) Nick Catsburg | (France) TDS Racing |

== Championship standings ==
| Pos | Driver | SPA (Belgium) | | BRN (Czech Republic) | | MAG (France) | | HUN (Hungary) | | HOC (Germany) | | SIL (United Kingdom) | | CAT (Spain) | | Points |
|---|---|---|---|---|---|---|---|---|---|---|---|---|---|---|---|---|
| 1 | (Netherlands) Nick Catsburg | **C** | **2** | **Ret** | 1 | **1** | 2 | **4** | **1** | **1** | 2 | **2** | **1** | 1 | **1** | 161 |
| 2 | (France) Pierre Thiriet | C | 4 | 2 | 4 | 2 | 1 | 1 | 3 | 2 | 4 | 3 | 5 | 8 | 4 | 134 |
| 3 | (Switzerland) Stefano Comini | C | 3 | 1 | **2** | Ret | **3** | 14 | Ret | 4 | **1** | 1 | 2 | **5** | Ret | 107 |
| 4 | (Netherlands) Bas Schothorst | C | 6 | 4 | 3 | 3 | 4 | 8 | Ret | 12 | 5 | 6 | 4 | 3 | 5 | 88 |
| 5 | (France) Dimitri Enjalbert | C | 1 | 3 | Ret | DSQ | 5 | 5 | 7 | 5 | Ret | 10 | 8 | Ret | 2 | 67 |
| 6 | (France) Jean-Philippe Madonia | C | 5 | Ret | 6 | DNS | 7 | 2 | 2 | 9 | 8 | 8 | 14 | 9 | 7 | 58 |
| 7 | (Netherlands) Hoevert Vos | C | DNS | Ret | Ret | 8 | 9 | 3 | 5 | 7 | 7 | 15 | Ret | 4 | 8 | 45 |
| 8 | (Italy) Niccolò Nalio | C | Ret | DSQ | 5 | 5 | 6 | 9 | 4 | 10 | 17 | 9 | 6 | Ret | 6 | 44 |
| 9 | (Switzerland) Fabien Thuner | C | Ret | Ret | 8 | 4 | 10 | 6 | 6 | 6 | 6 | 11 | 9 | 7 | Ret | 43 |
| 10 | (France) Sébastien Dhouailly | C | 9 | Ret | 7 | DNS | 11 | 7 | 10 | Ret | Ret | 5 | 7 | 6 | Ret | 30 |
| 11 | (Netherlands) Raymond Coronel | C | 7 | 6 | 9 | 7 | 14 | 10 | 17 | 15 | 11 | 7 | 11 | 15 | 11 | 24 |
| 12 | (Belgium) David Dermont | C | 8 | 5 | 10 | 9 | 8 | 18 | Ret | 11 | 9 | 13 | 10 | 10 | Ret | 23 |
| 13 | (Netherlands) Wim Beelen | C | Ret | | | 6 | 13 | Ret | 9 | 8 | 12 | 14 | 12 | 11 | Ret | 12 |
| 14 | (Netherlands) Harrie Kolen | C | Ret | 7 | Ret | 11 | 15 | 11 | 11 | 16 | Ret | 12 | 13 | 16 | 9 | 7 |
| 15 | (Netherlands) Jeroen Schothorst | C | 14 | Ret | 13 | 15 | Ret | 13 | 8 | 14 | 10 | 18 | DNS | 13 | 14 | 5 |
| 16 | (Netherlands) Steven Gijsen | C | 11 | 9 | 12 | 10 | 19 | Ret | Ret | 13 | 15 | Ret | 15 | 12 | 10 | 5 |
| 17 | (Netherlands) Wilko Becker | | | 8 | 15 | | | | | | | | | | | 3 |
| 18 | (Italy) Navajo | C | 10 | 12† | 11 | 16 | 12 | | 15 | 17 | Ret | 16 | 18 | 18 | DSQ | 1 |
| 19 | (Italy) Angelo Baiguera | C | 12 | 10 | 14 | 12 | 16 | 16 | 13 | 19 | 16 | 17 | 16 | 17 | 13 | 1 |
| 20 | (France) Vito Rodrigues | | 13 | 11 | | 13 | | | 14 | 20 | | | DNS | | | 0 |
| 21 | (France) Jean-Charles Miginiac | C | 15 | DSQ | Ret | 14 | 18 | 12 | 12 | 18 | 14 | Ret | 17 | 14 | 12 | 0 |
| 22 | (Spain) Rafael Unzurrunzaga | C | 16 | 13 | 16 | NC | 20 | 19 | 16 | 21 | 18 | 19 | Ret | 19 | 15 | 0 |
| 23 | (Belgium) Caroline Grifnée | C | | | Ret | | 17 | 15 | | | 13 | Ret | | | | 0 |
| 24 | (Italy) Giovanni Seminara | | | | | | | 17 | | | | | | | | 0 |
Guest drivers ineligible for points
| | (France) Renaud Derlot | | | | | | | | | 3 | 3 | 4 | 3 | 2 | 3 | 0 |
| Pos | Driver | SPA (Belgium) | | BRN (Czech Republic) | | MAG (France) | | HUN (Hungary) | | HOC (Germany) | | SIL (United Kingdom) | | CAT (Spain) | | Points |

| Colour | Result |
|---|---|
| Gold | Winner |
| Silver | Second place |
| Bronze | Third place |
| Green | Points classification |
| Blue | Non-points classification |
| Blue | Non-classified finish (NC) |
| Purple | Retired, not classified (Ret) |
| Red | Did not qualify (DNQ) |
| Red | Did not pre-qualify (DNPQ) |
| Black | Disqualified (DSQ) |
| White | Did not start (DNS) |
| White | Withdrew (WD) |
| White | Race cancelled (C) |
| Blank | Did not practice (DNP) |
| Blank | Did not arrive (DNA) |
| Blank | Excluded (EX) |

**Bold** – Pole
Italics – Fastest Lap

| Position | 1st | 2nd | 3rd | 4th | 5th | 6th | 7th | 8th | 9th | 10th |
| Points | 15 | 12 | 10 | 8 | 6 | 5 | 4 | 3 | 2 | 1 |
