= Margot Laffite =

French racing driver and television presenter (born 1980)

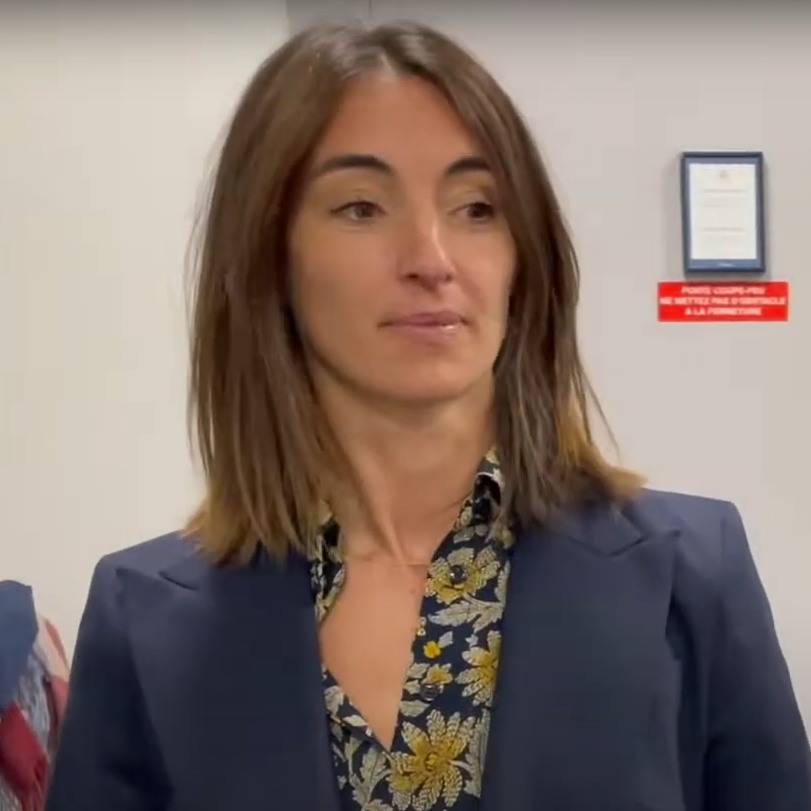
- Margot Laffite in 2021
- Born: Marguerite Laffite; 6 November 1980 (age 45); Paris, France
- Citizenship: French
- Occupations: Racing driver, television presenter
- Spouse: Arnaud Tsamere
- Children: 2
- Parent: Jacques Laffite (father)

Championship titles
- 2005, 2006, 2017, 2018, 2019: Andros Trophy Féminin and Best Dame

Marguerite "Margot" Laffite (born 6 November 1980) is a French racing driver and television presenter.

== Biography ==
Laffite discovered motorsport in 1995, at Le Mans, where she saw her father Jacques Laffite racing in real life for the first time.

In 2011, Laffite hosted the Dimanche F1 program on Eurosport. She also hosts the V6 show, devoted to the automobile, created in September 2000 by Paul Chelly, for the AB Moteurs television channel. In 2013, following the purchase of the rights to Formula 1 by Canal+, Laffite joined the encrypted channel and became a columnist in 2013 then presenter from 2014 of the Formula One program on Canal+, and "joker" presenter (replacement) of the program Les Spécialistes F1 on Canal+ Sport. The show ended in 2016. Since 2018, alternating with Thomas Sénecal, she has been at the Grands Prix with Franck Montagny as host of the programs broadcast during race weekends.

Since 2013, Laffite has been a sponsor of the Association du Sport et Plus.

== Motorsport career ==
Laffite embarked on a career as a racing driver like her father. In particular, she has participated on several occasions in the Andros Trophy, for which she won the Women's Trophy in 2005.

== Other work ==
In September 2017, Laffite was part of the jury of the Chantilly Arts & Elegance Richard Mille 2017 concours d'élégance. In April 2018, she participated in the Tour Auto Optic 2000 with Olivier Pernaut, son of Jean-Pierre Pernaut, with an Alfa Romeo Giulia Sprint GT from 1966.

== Personal life ==
Laffite gave birth to a boy, Albert, on 4 February 2015, born of her relationship with Arnaud Tsamere with whom she married in 2015. The couple subsequently divorced. In February 2020, she gave birth to her second child, a daughter.
