= Mike Verschuur =

Dutch racing driver (born 1987)

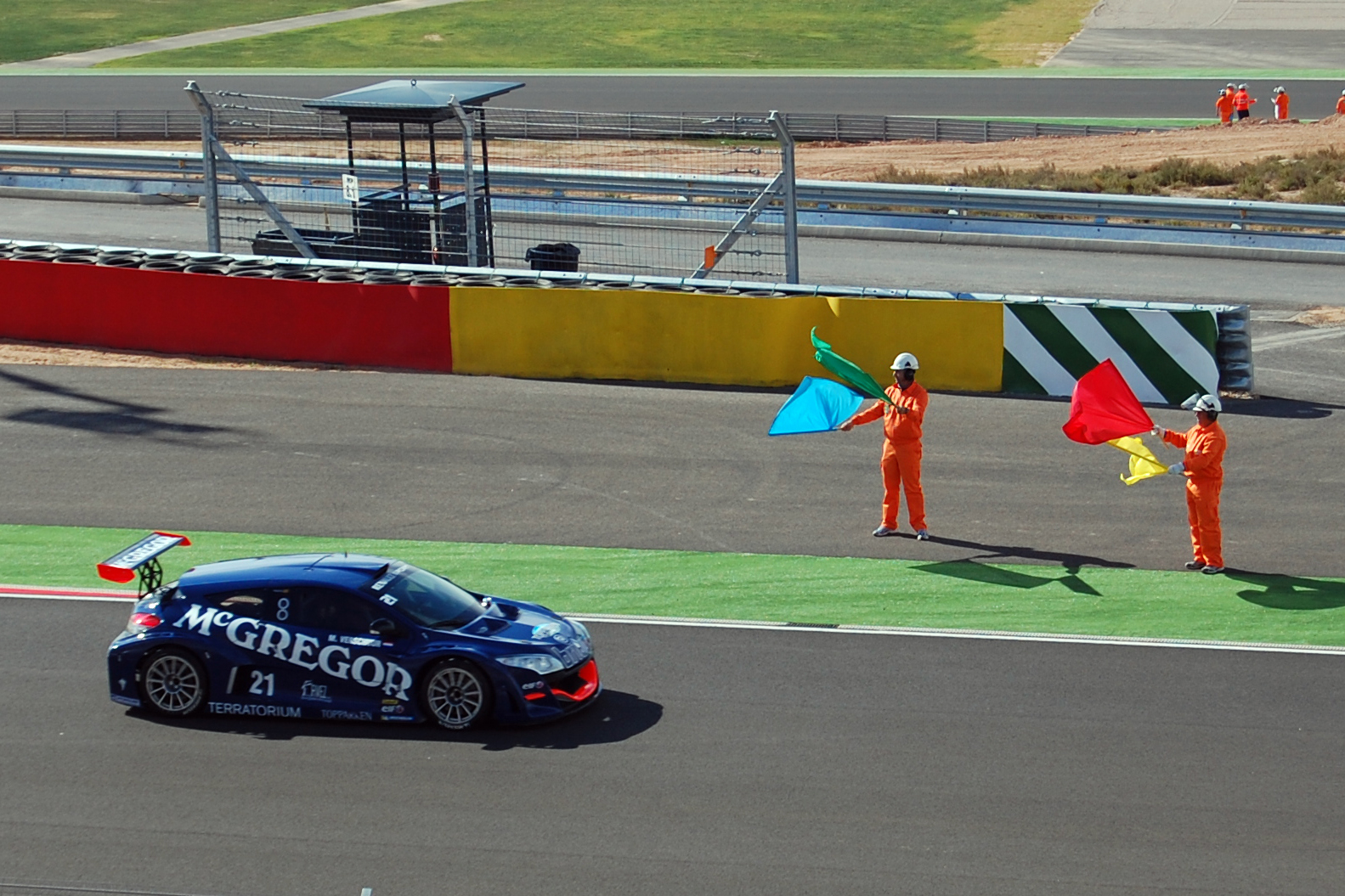
- Verschuur in Motorland Aragón in 2009
- Nationality: (Netherlands) Dutch
- Born: 12 August 1987 (age 39) Netherlands

Championship titles
- 2009: Eurocup Mégane Trophy

Mike Verschuur (born 12 August 1987) is a Dutch racing driver. He won the Eurocup Mégane Trophy series in 2009 and the Renault Clio Cup Netherlands in 2006. He has also competed in other such series as Porsche Supercup. He is openly gay. His father Frans Verschuur and sister Sheila Verschuur are also racing drivers.

Sporting positions
Preceded by Michaël Rossi	Eurocup Mégane Trophy; Champion; 2009	Succeeded by Nick Catsburg
