= 2023 Renault Clio Cup Series =

58th season of Renault one-make racing series

The 2023 Renault Clio Cup Series is the 58th season of Renault one-make racing series. It is the fourth season that uses Renault Clio R.S. V. The season began on 7 April at Nogaro and ended on 12 November at Barcelona.

David Pouget from GPA Racing won the series Super Winner title for leading the overall classification, the first time the title is awarded. He also won both the European Cup and French Cup. Adrián Schimpf from AST Competition won the Spanish Cup, Luca Franca from MC Motortecnica won the Italian Cup, and Gabrielle Torelli from Rangoni Corse won the Mid-European Cup.

== Calendar ==
The calendar features 13 rounds across five regional cups: Europe, Spain, France, Italy, and Mid-Europe. Each round would feature 2 races each.

Round	Circuit	Date	(Europe)	(France)	(Spain)	(Italy)	ME
1	(France) Circuit Paul Armagnac, Nogaro	7–10 April		Yes	Yes		
2	(Italy) Autodromo Nazionale di Monza, Monza	21–23 April	Yes			Yes	Yes
3	(France) Circuit de Nevers Magny-Cours, Magny-Cours	5–7 May		Yes	Yes		
4	(Belgium) Circuit de Spa-Francorchamps, Stavelot	26–28 May	Yes	Yes		Yes	Yes
5	(Hungary) Hungaroring, Mogyoród	16–18 June	Yes				Yes
6	(Italy) Misano World Circuit Marco Simoncelli, Misano Adriatico	14–16 July				Yes	
7	(Germany) Nürburgring, Nürburg	28–30 July	Yes	Yes			Yes
8	(Austria) Red Bull Ring, Spielberg, Styria	8–10 September	Yes			Yes	Yes
9	(Spain) Circuit Ricardo Tormo, Cheste	22–24 September	Yes		Yes		
10	(France) Circuit Paul Ricard, Le Castellet, Var	6–8 October		Yes	Yes	Yes	
11	(Netherlands) Circuit Zandvoort, Zandvoort	13–15 October	Yes				Yes
12	(Italy) Autodromo Internazionale Enzo e Dino Ferrari, Imola	27–29 October	Yes			Yes	
13	(Spain) Circuit de Barcelona-Catalunya, Montmeló	10–12 November	Yes	Yes	Yes		

== Entry list ==
Each driver may register for 1 (one) or 2 (two) regional cups.

Team	No.	Drivers	Class	Regions		Rounds
Milan Competition	1	(France) Anthony Jurado		EU	ME	2, 4–5, 7–9, 11-13
Milan Competition	5	(France) Nicolas Milan		EU	FR	1–5, 7-13
Milan Competition	23	(Spain) Jordi Palomeras	C	ES		1, 3, 9, 13
Milan Competition	31	(France) Jeremy Bordagaray	R	FR	ES	1, 3–4, 7, 9-10, 13
Milan Competition	35	(France) Thomas Compain	C	EU		7, 10
Milan Competition	69	(Italy) Quinto Stefana	R	EU	IT	2, 8-12
Milan Competition	111	(France) Matthieu Lannepoudenx	C	ES		1, 3
GM Sport	2	(France) Florian Coruble	C	FR		1, 3–4, 10, 13
GM Sport	13	(France) Raphael Cuadrado	R	FR		1, 3–4, 7, 10
GM Sport	33	(France) Michel Faye	R	EU	ES	7, 9-13
GM Sport	99	(France) Guillaume Maio	C	EU	ME	1–5, 7-13
GM Sport	158	(France) Florian Venturi	C	FR		1, 3–4, 7, 10, 13
GM Sport	333	(Hungary) Tim Gábor	C	EU	ME	2, 5
Stucki Motorsport	3	(Switzerland) Daniel Nyffeler	C	ME		2, 4–5, 7-8
Stucki Motorsport	9	(Switzerland) Andreas Stucki		ME		2, 4–5, 7–8, 11
Baziret Sport	4	(France) Julien Baziret	C	EU	ME	2, 4, 8–9, 11, 13
Kool Racing	6	(Netherlands) Martijn Kool	C	EU		7, 11
T2CM	7	(France) Mickael Carree	C	EU	FR	1-4
T2CM	16	(France) Lionel Viguier	R	EU	FR	1–2, 4–5, 7-13
T2CM	44	(France) Veenesh Shunker	R	FR		1, 3–4, 7, 10, 13
T2CM	54	(France) Sébastien Gehin	R	ME		2, 4, 7
T2CM	88	(France) Marc Fleurance	R	ME		2
T2CM	133	(France) Samuel Chaligne	R	FR		1, 3–4, 7, 10, 13
Team VRT	8	(Spain) Joaquin Rodrigo	R	ES		1, 3, 9-10, 13
Team VRT	26	(Spain) Alex Royo		EU	ME	9, 13
Team VRT	66	(Spain) Alejandro Romero	R	ES		1, 3, 9, 10, 13
Team VRT	79	(Spain) Javier Cicuendez	C	ES		1, 3
Motorismo Racing Team	10	(Spain) Sergio Casalins	R	ES		1, 3
Sevenhills Motorsport	11	(Italy) Andrea Bonifazi	R	IT		4
Sevenhills Motorsport	37	(Italy) Mario Federico Cappella	R	IT		4
Sevenhills Motorsport	72	(Italy) Manuel Stefani	R	IT		2, 4, 6, 10, 12
Sevenhills Motorsport	95	(Italy) Adam Sascha	C	IT		2, 4, 6, 8, 10, 12
Rangoni Corse	12	(Italy) Gabrielle Torelli		EU	ME	2, 4–5, 7–9, 11-13
Rangoni Corse	43	(Italy) Damiano Puccetti	C	EU	ME	2, 4–5, 7–9, 11-13
LCB Racing	14	(Germany) Udo Brunner	R	EU		7–8, 11
GPA Racing	15	(France) David Pouget		EU	FR	All
GPA Racing	18	(France) Cédric Delcroix	R	FR		1, 3
GPA Racing	20	(France) Yann-Maël Navillod	R	FR		1
GPA Racing	25	(France) Alexandre Albouy		FR		1, 3–4, 10, 13
GPA Racing	29	(France) Alexandre Finkelstein	C	FR		1, 3–4, 7, 13
GPA Racing	42	(Spain) Mariano Alonso	C	FR		4
GPA Racing	42	(Spain) Mariano Alonso	C	EU		7, 11
GPA Racing	63	(Spain) Gabriel Alonso	R	FR		4
GPA Racing	63	(Spain) Gabriel Alonso	R	EU		7, 9, 11
GPA Racing	85	(France) Benjamin Cauvas	R	EU		2–5, 11, 13
GPA Racing	95	(France) Gaël Rostant	R	FR		1, 10, 13
GPA Racing	115	(France) Stéphane Nevers	R	FR		1, 10
GPA Racing	999	(France) "HORN"	R	FR		3, 13
Tuder Motorsport	17	(Italy) Daniele Pasquali	R	EU	IT	2, 4, 6, 8, 12
Tuder Motorsport	38	(Italy) Alessio Alcidi	C	IT		2, 4, 6, 8
Tuder Motorsport	39	(Italy) Alessandro Alcidi	R	IT		2, 6, 8, 10
Tuder Motorsport	138	(Italy) Davide Rosini (Note: Drivers who started their first race of the season at the final two round of the series are ineligible for points.)	C	IT		12
MC Motortecnica	19	(Italy) Gianalberto Francesco Coldani	C	IT		2, 4, 6, 8, 10, 12
MC Motortecnica	60	(Italy) Leonardo Arduini	C	EU	IT	2, 4–6, 8, 10, 12
MC Motortecnica	91	(Italy) Luca Franca	R	EU	IT	2, 4–6, 8, 10, 12–13
MC Motortecnica	116	(Italy) Giacomo Trebbi	C	IT		2, 4, 6, 10, 12
MC Motortecnica	122	(Italy) Ludovico Longoni	C	EU	IT	2, 4, 6, 8, 10, 12–13
MC Motortecnica	372	(Italy) Andrea Chierichetti	R	EU	IT	2, 4, 6, 10, 12
AST Competition	21	(Netherlands) Stephan Polderman	R	EU	ME	5, 7-13
AST Competition	22	(Spain) Lydia Sempere	C	ES		1, 3, 9, 10, 13
AST Competition	55	(Netherlands) René Steenmetz	R	EU	ME	5, 7-13
AST Competition	113	(Spain) Adrián Schimpf	C	EU	ES	1–5, 7-13
AST Competition	199	(Spain) Alejandro Schimpf	C	EU	ES	1–5, 7-13
Chefo Sport	21	(Netherlands) Stephan Polderman	R	EU	ME	2, 4
Chefo Sport	55	(Netherlands) René Steenmetz	R	EU	ME	2, 4
Chefo Sport	119	(Spain) Fernando Navarrete		EU		2, 4
Chefo Sport	128	(Spain) Iván Hernández	C	ES		9
JSB Compétition	24	(France) Aurelien Renet	C	FR		1, 3–4, 7, 10
Essecorse	27	(Italy) Federico Danova	C	IT		2, 4, 6, 8
Essecorse	57	(Italy) Matteo Poloni		IT		10
Essecorse	61	(Italy) Luciano Gioia		IT		6, 12
Essecorse	61	(Italy) Rocco Romeo		IT		6
Essecorse	82	(Italy) Jacopo Giuseppe Cimenes	C	EU	IT	2, 4-13
Essecorse	107	(Italy) Cristian Ricciarini		EU	IT	2, 4–8, 12–13
Pajot Team	28	(France) David Pajot	C	FR		13
Faro Racing	30	(Italy) Alex Lancellotti	R	EU	IT	2, 4, 6, 8, 10, 12
Faro Racing	41	(Italy) Simone Di Luca		IT		4
Faro Racing	67	(Italy) Ercole Cipolla	R	IT		6
Faro Racing	73	(Italy) Sandro Cutini	R	IT		2, 4, 6, 8, 10, 12
Faro Racing	76	(Italy) Massimiliano Danetti		IT		2
Faro Racing	84	(Italy) Mattia Lancellotti	C	EU	IT	2, 4, 6, 8, 10, 12
Faro Racing	121	(Italy) Davide Gaggianesi	R	IT		8
Carpek Racing	51	(Germany) Henrik Seibel	C	ME		4–5, 7–8, 11
Carpek Racing	93	(Hungary) Szabolcs Lantos	C	ME		5
Carpek Racing	100	(Sweden) Filip Sandström	C	ME		8
Carpek Racing	101	(Czech Republic) Tomáš Pekař		EU	ME	2, 4–5, 7–8, 11, 13
Oregon Team	53	(Italy) "DUE"	R	IT		2, 4, 6, 8, 10, 12
UNIQ Racing	58	(Taiwan) Lin Chen-han	C	ME		2
UNIQ Racing	75	(Mexico) Eduardo Miranda Cordoba	C	ME		8, 11
UNIQ Racing	125	(Poland) Jerzy Spinkiewicz		EU	IT	2, 4-12
LR Performance	65	(France) Fabien Julia	R	FR		1, 3–4, 7, 10, 13
Teamalcar	77	(France) Jean-Louis Carponcin	R	ES		9-10, 13
Team Lucas	78	(France) Laurent Dziadus	R	FR		1, 3–4, 7
Progetto E20 Motorsport	50	(Italy) Donato Barnaba		IT		12
Progetto E20 Motorsport	103	(Italy) Francesco Miotto	C	IT		2, 4, 6, 8, 12
Progetto E20 Motorsport	105	(Italy) Alessandro Brigatti	C	IT		2, 4, 6, 8
Progetto E20 Motorsport	109	(Italy) Francesco Savoia	C	IT		2, 4, 6, 8
Dall Racing	112	(Denmark) Mathias Dall	C	EU		7, 11
Scuderia Costa Ovest	118	(Italy) Francesco Pagano	C	IT		2, 4, 6, 8, 10, 12
Comte Racing Team	137	(France) Calvin Comte	C	FR		13
Comte Racing Team	558	(France) Pierre Bredeaux	C	EU		2, 4-5, 13
Speed Motor	165	(Italy) Rolando Bordacchini	R	IT		6, 12
Lema Racing	169	(Slovenia) Jaka Marinsek	C	EU		2
Lema Racing	221	(Slovenia) Miha Primožič	R	IT		12
Lema Racing	777	(Slovenia) Nik Štefančič	C	IT		12
Tempo Racing Team	211	(Serbia) Nikola Miljkovic	C	EU	ME	2, 4–5, 7-9
Tempo Racing Team	233	(Serbia) Ivan Mandić	C	EU		2
TF Performance	300	(Norway) Knut Eirik Knudsen		EU		11

Icon	Class
Region
EU	Europe
ES	Spain
FR	France
IT	Italy
ME	Mid-Europe
Drivers
C	Challengers Cup
R	Racers Cup

== Results ==
Bold indicates overall winner.

Round		Circuit	Race Overall Winner	Europe Cup	France Cup	(Spain) España Cup	(Italy) Italia Cup	Mid-Europe Cup
1	R1	(France) Nogaro	(France) Nicolas Milan		**(France) Nicolas Milan**	(Spain) Adrián Schimpf		
1	R2	(France) Nogaro	(France) Matthieu Lannepoudenx		(France) Nicolas Milan	**(France) Matthieu Lannepoudenx**		
2	R1	(Italy) Monza	(Italy) Gabrielle Torelli	**(Italy) Gabrielle Torelli**			(Italy) Cristian Ricciarini	**(Italy) Gabrielle Torelli**
2	R2	(Italy) Monza	(Italy) Gabrielle Torelli	**(Italy) Gabrielle Torelli**			(Poland) Jerzy Spinkiewicz	**(Italy) Gabrielle Torelli**
3	R1	(France) Magny-Cours	(France) David Pouget		**(France) David Pouget**	(France) Jeremy Bordagaray		
3	R2	(France) Magny-Cours	(France) David Pouget		**(France) David Pouget**	(France) Jeremy Bordagaray		
4	R1	(Belgium) Spa-Francorchamps	(Italy) Gabrielle Torelli	**(Italy) Gabrielle Torelli**	(France) David Pouget		(Italy) Alessandro Brigatti	**(Italy) Gabrielle Torelli**
4	R2	(Belgium) Spa-Francorchamps	(France) Anthony Jurado	**(France) Anthony Jurado**	(France) Nicolas Milan		(Italy) Luca Franca	**(France) Anthony Jurado**
5	R1	(Hungary) Hungaroring	(France) Anthony Jurado	**(France) Anthony Jurado**				**(France) Anthony Jurado**
5	R2	(Hungary) Hungaroring	(Italy) Gabrielle Torelli	**(Italy) Gabrielle Torelli**				**(Italy) Gabrielle Torelli**
6	R1	(Italy) Misano	(France) David Pouget				(Italy) Luca Franca	
6	R2	(Italy) Misano	(France) David Pouget				(Italy) Luca Franca	
7	R1	(Germany) Nürburgring	(France) Alexandre Finkelstein	(France) David Pouget	**(France) Alexandre Finkelstein**			(Italy) Gabrielle Torelli
7	R2	(Germany) Nürburgring	(Italy) Gabrielle Torelli	**(Italy) Gabrielle Torelli**	(France) David Pouget			**(Italy) Gabrielle Torelli**
8	R1	(Austria) Red Bull Ring	(France) Anthony Jurado	**(France) Anthony Jurado**			(Italy) Luca Franca	**(France) Anthony Jurado**
8	R2	(Austria) Red Bull Ring	(France) David Pouget	**(France) David Pouget**			(Italy) Luca Franca	**(France) David Pouget**
9	R1	(Spain) Valencia	(France) David Pouget	**(France) David Pouget**		(Spain) Adrián Schimpf		
9	R2	(Spain) Valencia	(France) Anthony Jurado	**(France) Anthony Jurado**		(Spain) Alejandro Schimpf		
10	R1	(France) Circuit Paul Ricard	(Poland) Jerzy Spinkiewicz		(France) Alexandre Albouy	(Spain) Adrián Schimpf	**(Poland) Jerzy Spinkiewicz**	
10	R2	(France) Circuit Paul Ricard	(France) David Pouget		**(France) David Pouget**	(Spain) Adrián Schimpf	(Poland) Jerzy Spinkiewicz	
11	R1	(Netherlands) Zandvoort	(Italy) Gabrielle Torelli	**(Italy) Gabrielle Torelli**				**(Italy) Gabrielle Torelli**
11	R2	(Netherlands) Zandvoort	(France) David Pouget	**(France) David Pouget**				(Czech Republic) Tomáš Pekař
12	R1	(Italy) Imola	(France) David Pouget	**(France) David Pouget**			(Italy) Luca Franca	
12	R2	(Italy) Imola	(Italy) Gabrielle Torelli	**(Italy) Gabrielle Torelli**			(Italy) Mattia Lancellotti	
13	R1	(Spain) Barcelona	(Italy) Gabrielle Torelli	**(Italy) Gabrielle Torelli**	(France) David Pouget	(Spain) Jordi Palomeras		
13	R2	(Spain) Barcelona	(Italy) Gabrielle Torelli	**(Italy) Gabrielle Torelli**	(France) David Pouget	(Spain) Adrián Schimpf		

== Championship standings ==
=== Points systems ===
In each race, points are awarded for the top 20 (Overall and Regionals) or top 10 (Challengers and Racers, for each Regional Cups). Entries are required to complete 90% of the winning car's race distance (rounded down) in order to be classified and earn points.

For Clio Cup Europe, two lowest race scores are dropped from final classification; however, the dropped races cannot be from disqualifications or from the last round of the Cup. For other regional cups, one lowest race score is dropped, with similar criteria. No race scores should be dropped in Series overall classification.

==== Overall and Regionals ====
Position	1st	2nd	3rd	4th	5th	6th	7th	8th	9th	10th	11th	12th	13th	14th	15th	16th	17th	18th	19th	20th
Points	50	42	36	33	30	27	24	22	20	18	16	14	12	10	8	6	4	3	2	1

==== Challengers and Racers ====
Position	1st	2nd	3rd	4th	5th	6th	7th	8th	9th	10th
Points	25	18	15	12	10	8	6	4	2	1

=== Clio Cup Series ===
==== Drivers Overall Classification ====
Pos.	Driver	(France) NOG		(Italy) MON		(France) MAG		(Belgium) SPA		(Hungary) HUN		(Italy) MIS		(Germany) NUR		(Austria) RBR		(Spain) VAL		(France) LEC		(Netherlands) ZAN		(Italy) IMO		(Spain) BAR		Points
1	(France) David Pouget	3	5	2	2	1	1	2	10	2	2	1	1	2	2	3	1	1	3	4	1	Ret	1	1	3	3	3	1041
2	(France) Nicolas Milan	1	2	8	3	2	2	9	6	7	20			6	3	36	8	2	2	3	3	3	2	7	2	4	4	757
3	(Italy) Gabrielle Torelli			1	1			1	3	3	1			3	1	2	27	DNS	4			1	17	8	1	1	1	659
4	(Spain) Adrián Schimpf	5	8	14	10	9	6	7	35	24	4			4	4	6	15	3	Ret	5	2	5	5	10	4	10	2	564
5	(France) Anthony Jurado			9	4			4	1	1	6			5	7	1	5	9	1			2	Ret	4	18	2	23	537
6	(Italy) Luca Franca			4	40†			11	2	12	12	2	2			5	2			7	7			2	8	21	39	387
7	(Spain) Alejandro Schimpf	8	7	26	8	8	12	Ret	34	14	9			14	8	11	25	7	6	11	9	4	12	19	9	23	9	358
8	(Poland) Jerzy Spinkiewicz			Ret	5			43	32	8	17	Ret	6	8	31†	Ret	DNS	5	5	1	4	6	6	3	Ret			338
9	(Czech Republic) Tomáš Pekař			11	41†			5	9	4	3			7	29	4	3					9	3			8	6	333
10	(Italy) Jacopo Giuseppe Cimenes			7	Ret			30	33	9	11	8	5	16	11	7	6	12	Ret	20	16	8	8	22	12	14	10	292
11	(Italy) Cristian Ricciarini			3	12			25	13	11	8	5	4	12	5	18	Ret							12	7	9	Ret	268
12	(France) Guillaume Maio	18	9	15	11	12	Ret	24	52†	13	15			20	13	27	Ret	6	7	9	15	7	7	14	11	13	Ret	259
13	(France) Alexandre Albouy	2	4			4	8	8	42											2	5					11	31	240
14	(Italy) Giacomo Trebbi			6	9			16	12			3	3			Ret	9			14	11			6	6			239
15	(Italy) Mattia Lancellotti			5	7			14	18			4	7			13	16			12	6			9	5			233
16	(France) Alexandre Finkelstein	4	3			3	3	6	38					1	Ret											35	Ret	218
17	(France) Jeremy Bordagaray	7	18			7	4	28	37					13	10			11	20	10	13					22	15	169
18	(Serbia) Nikola Miljkovic			12	14			13	DSQ	5	10			10	6	21	4	DSQ										162
19	(France) Pierre Bredeaux			17	20			10	4	6	5															7	7	161
20	(France) Aurelien Renet	29†	6			5	5	15	Ret					11	Ret					6	23							138
21	(Italy) Leonardo Arduini			16	16			22	16	19	14	6	9			14	7			15	10			Ret	DNS			137
22	(Italy) Alessandro Brigatti			23	13			3	5			12	8			8	Ret											136
23	(France) Florian Coruble	6	Ret			6	10	18	Ret											8	Ret					12	8	133
24	(Spain) Jordi Palomeras	20	14			11	13											4	Ret							5	5	132
25	(Italy) Damiano Puccetti			18	15			27	11	23	18			22	12	20	10	15	Ret			13	Ret	11	24	6	27	126
26	(Italy) Alex Lancellotti			Ret	Ret			Ret	17			7	10			23	12			16	8			5	Ret			118
27	(France) Matthieu Lannepoudenx	9	1			10	7																					112
28	(Netherlands) Stephan Polderman			Ret	Ret			21	31	20	24			23	15	15	11	17	10	17	12	11	21	17	14	15	28	111
29	(France) Lionel Viguier	11	12	46†	39			29	15	Ret	23			18	20	25	18	10	8	29	20	17	18	18	28	20	13	109
30	(France) Florian Venturi	10	15			27	9	12	7					19	25					13	17					18	29	105
31	(Switzerland) Andreas Stucki			13	18			26	14	10	13			9	26	10	Ret					Ret	15					101
32	(Netherlands) René Steenmetz			29	Ret			20	25	16	21			17	26	12	28	14	11	35	14	15	16	15	Ret	17	12	101
33	(France) Julien Baziret			10	6			17	Ret							24	Ret	22	12			10	13			26	17	97
34	(France) Fabien Julia	14	10			13	14	37	29					Ret	DNS					26	24					19	14	62
35	(France) Mickael Carree	12	11	25	19	14	11	Ret	DNS																			58
36	(Italy) Francesco Savoia			20	23			41	8			10	13			Ret	Ret											53
37	(Spain) Mariano Alonso							Ret	Ret					15	9							16	10					52
38	(Netherlands) Martijn Kool													24	17							14	4					47
39	(Spain) Alex Royo																	8	Ret							16	11	44
40	(Italy) Quinto Stefana			44†	Ret											28	22	16	13	25	19	18	9	21	22			43
41	(Italy) Ludovico Longoni			45†	35			54	39			21	14			26	14			24	26			20	13	24	16	39
42	(Italy) Alessandro Alcidi			34	25							9	12			Ret	17			22	38							38
43	(Hungary) Tim Gábor			19	Ret					15	7																	34
44	(Denmark) Mathias Dall													31	18							12	11					33
45	(Spain) Iván Hernández																	13	9									32
46	(Italy) Francesco Miotto			37	30			44	20			20	Ret			Ret	31							13	10			32
47	(Italy) Francesco Pagano			42	Ret			32	36			11	11			33	Ret			21	27			Ret	EX			32
48	(France) Laurent Dziadus	15	13			17	Ret	33	30					21	Ret													24
49	(Spain) Sergio Casalins	19	16			15	15																					24
50	(Italy) Sandro Cutini			22	27			42	41			15	18			19	30			Ret	21			16	19			21
51	(Italy) Federico Danova			Ret	28			34	43			26	24†			9	Ret											20
52	(France) Benjamin Cauvas			32	33	24	19	Ret	21	18	19											21	14			27	18	20
53	(Italy) Gianalberto Francesco Coldani			21	21			35	22			Ret	15			16	19			18	22			Ret	DNQ			19
54	(France) Cédric Delcroix	13	Ret			19	17																					18
55	(Italy) "DUE"			27	31			46	26			13	17			30	21			30	29			30	21			16
56	(Italy) Andrea Chierichetti			35	32			48	51			14	16							32	32			DNQ	DNQ			16
57	(France) Thomas Compain													29	14					19	18							15
58	(Spain) Alejandro Romero	25	19			22	23											19	14	31	Ret					28	32	14
59	(France) "HORN"					16	16																			Ret	20	13
60	(Sweden) Filip Sandström															Ret	13											12
61	(Spain) Lydia Sempere	26	25			26	22											18	15	39	36					34	25	11
62	(Italy) Adam Sascha			30	17			39	23			18	Ret			31	Ret			40†	25			23	17			11
63	(Hungary) Szabolcs Lantos							17	16																			10
64	(Germany) Henrik Seibel							23	19	22	22			28	19	34	20					19	19					9
65	(France) Raphael Cuadrado	16	20			20	21	31	46					25	23					Ret	30							8
66	(Spain) Joaquin Rodrigo	23	23			23	20											19	16	33	35					33	Ret	8
67	(Italy) Manuel Stefani			38	38			47	50			17	19							38	Ret			26	20			7
68	(Italy) Alessio Alcidi			24	36			36	44			16	Ret			22	23											6
69	(Switzerland) Daniel Nyffeler			41	Ret			40	40	21	Ret			27	16	29	DNS											6
70	(Spain) Javier Cicuendez	21	24			18	18																					6
71	(France) Yann-Maël Navillod	17	Ret																									4
72	(France) Samuel Chaligne	22	17			21	Ret	49	28					30	24					27	31					29	21	4
73	(Italy) Davide Gaggianesi															17	29											4
74	(Spain) Gabriel Alonso							53	49					34	28			23	17			23	23					4
75	(France) Jean-Louis Carponcin																	21	18	36	33					31	24	3
76	(Italy) Daniele Pasquali			33	37			51	48			19	20			32	24							32	26			3
77	(Italy) Simone Di Luca							19	27																			2
78	(France) Michel Faye													33	Ret			24	19	37	37	22	22	29	25	36	Ret	2
79	(Mexico) Eduardo Miranda Cordoba															Ret	DNS					20	20					2
-	(Italy) Andrea Bonifazi							50	45																			0
-	(Germany) Udo Brunner													35	30	35	26					24	24					0
-	(Italy) Mario Federico Cappella											25	23†															0
-	(France) Veenesh Shunker	28	21			25	24	52	47					32	27					28	28					Ret	26	0
-	(France) Sébastien Gehin			28	26			38	24					26	22													0
-	(Taiwan) Lin Chen-han			Ret	Ret																							0
-	(Italy) Rocco Romeo											24																0
-	(Italy) Luciano Gioia												Ret											28	DNS			0
-	(Italy) Ercole Cipolla											22	22															0
-	(Italy) Massimiliano Danetti			36	29																							0
-	(France) Marc Fleurance			40	22																							0
-	(France) Stéphane Nevers	24	Ret																	34	34							0
-	(Spain) Fernando Navarrete			43	24			45	Ret																			0
-	(Italy) Rolando Bordacchini											23	21											Ret	Ret			0
-	(Slovenia) Jaka Marinsek			31	34																							0
-	(France) Gaël Rostant	27	22																	Ret	Ret					30	Ret	0
-	(Serbia) Ivan Mandić			39	Ret																							0
-	(Norway) Knut Eirik Knudsen																					Ret	25					0
Ineligible to score points
-	(Slovenia) Nik Štefančič																							24	15			-
-	(Italy) Davide Rosini																							27	16			-
-	(France) David Pajot																									25	19	-
-	(France) Calvin Comte																									32	22	-
-	(Slovenia) Miha Primožič																							25	23			-
-	(Italy) Donato Barnaba																							31	27			-
Pos.	Driver	(France) NOG		(Italy) MON		(France) MAG		(Belgium) SPA		(Hungary) HUN		(Italy) MIS		(Germany) NUR		(Austria) RBR		(Spain) VAL		(France) LEC		(Netherlands) ZAN		(Italy) IMO		(Spain) BAR		Points

Colour	Result
Gold	Winner
Silver	Second place
Bronze	Third place
Green	Points classification
Blue	Non-points classification
Blue	Non-classified finish (NC)
Purple	Retired, not classified (Ret)
Red	Did not qualify (DNQ)
Red	Did not pre-qualify (DNPQ)
Black	Disqualified (DSQ)
White	Did not start (DNS)
White	Withdrew (WD)
White	Race cancelled (C)
Blank	Did not practice (DNP)
Blank	Did not arrive (DNA)
Blank	Excluded (EX)

† – Drivers did not finish the race, but were classified as they completed 90% of the race distance.

=== Clio Cup Europe ===
Pos.	Driver	(Italy) MON		(Belgium) SPA		(Hungary) HUN		(Germany) NUR		(Austria) RBR		(Spain) VAL		(Netherlands) ZAN		(Italy) IMO		(Spain) BAR		Points
1	(France) David Pouget	2	2	2	10	2	2	2	2	3	1	1	3	Ret	1	1	3	3	3	682 (706)
2	(Italy) Gabrielle Torelli	1	1	1	3	3	1	3	1	2	27	DNS	4	1	17	8	1	1	1	669 (670)
3	(France) Anthony Jurado	9	4	4	1	1	6	5	7	1	5	9	1	2	Ret	4	18	2	23	546 (568)
4	(France) Nicolas Milan	8	3	9	6	7	20	6	3	36	8	2	2	3	2	7	2	4	4	526 (529)
5	(Spain) Adrián Schimpf	14	10	7	35	24	4	4	4	6	15	3	Ret	5	5	10	4	10	2	417 (418)
6	(Czech Republic) Tomáš Pekař	11	41†	5	9	4	3	7	29	4	3			9	3			8	6	354
7	(Spain) Alejandro Schimpf	26	8	Ret	34	14	9	14	8	11	25	7	6	4	12	19	9	23	9	280 (282)
8	(Italy) Luca Franca	4	40†	11	2	12	12			5	2					2	8	21	39	275
9	(Italy) Jacopo Giuseppe Cimenes	7	Ret	30	33	9	11	16	11	7	6	12	Ret	8	8	22	12	14	10	272
10	(Poland) Jerzy Spinkiewicz	Ret	5	43	32	8	17	8	31†	Ret	DNS	5	5	6	6	3	Ret			265
11	(France) Guillaume Maio	15	11	24	52†	13	15	20	13	27	Ret	6	7	7	7	14	11	13	Ret	237
12	(Italy) Cristian Ricciarini	3	12	25	13	11	8	12	5	18	Ret					12	7	9	Ret	227
13	(Italy) Damiano Puccetti	18	15	27	11	23	18	22	12	20	10	15	Ret	13	Ret	11	24	6	27	195
14	(Serbia) Nikola Miljkovic	12	14	13	DSQ	5	10	10	6	21	4	DSQ								186
15	(France) Pierre Bredeaux	17	20	10	4	6	5											7	7	180
16	(Italy) Mattia Lancellotti	5	7	14	18					13	16					9	5			162
17	(Netherlands) René Steenmetz	29	Ret	20	25	16	21	17	26	12	28	14	11	15	16	15	Ret	17	12	162
18	(Netherlands) Stephan Polderman	Ret	Ret	21	31	20	24	23	15	15	11	17	10	11	21	17	14	15	28	160
19	(France) Julien Baziret	10	6	17	Ret					24	Ret	22	12	10	13			26	17	138
20	(France) Lionel Viguier	46†	39	29	15	Ret	23	18	20	25	18	10	8	17	18	18	28	20	13	137
21	(Italy) Leonardo Arduini	16	16	22	16	19	14			14	7					Ret	DNS			100
22	(Italy) Quinto Stefana	44†	Ret							28	22	16	13	18	9	21	22			70
23	(Italy) Alex Lancellotti	Ret	Ret	Ret	17					23	12					5	Ret			66
24	(Spain) Mariano Alonso							15	9					16	10					60
25	(Italy) Ludovico Longoni	45†	35	54	39					26	14					20	13	24	16	56
25	(Netherlands) Martijn Kool							24	17					14	4					54
27	(France) Benjamin Cauvas	32	33	Ret	21	18	19							21	14			27	18	48
28	(Hungary) Tim Gábor	19	Ret			15	7													38
29	(Denmark) Mathias Dall							31	18					12	11					37
30	(France) Michel Faye							33	Ret			24	19	22	22	29	25	36	Ret	27
31	(Spain) Gabriel Alonso							34	28			23	17	23	23					22
32	(France) Thomas Compain							29	14											14
33	(France) Mickael Carree	25	19	Ret	DNS															11
34	(Italy) Daniele Pasquali	33	37	51	48					32	24					32	26			8
35	(Spain) Fernando Navarrete	43	24	45	Ret															4
36	(Italy) Andrea Chierichetti	35	32	48	51															3
37	(Germany) Udo Brunner							35	30	35	26			24	24					2
38	(Slovenia) Jaka Marinsek	31	34																	1
-	(Serbia) Ivan Mandić	39	Ret																	0
-	(Norway) Knut Eirik Knudsen													Ret	25					0
Pos.	Driver	(Italy) MON		(Belgium) SPA		(Hungary) HUN		(Germany) NUR		(Austria) RBR		(Spain) VAL		(Netherlands) ZAN		(Italy) IMO		(Spain) BAR		Points

Colour	Result
Gold	Winner
Silver	Second place
Bronze	Third place
Green	Points classification
Blue	Non-points classification
Blue	Non-classified finish (NC)
Purple	Retired, not classified (Ret)
Red	Did not qualify (DNQ)
Red	Did not pre-qualify (DNPQ)
Black	Disqualified (DSQ)
White	Did not start (DNS)
White	Withdrew (WD)
White	Race cancelled (C)
Blank	Did not practice (DNP)
Blank	Did not arrive (DNA)
Blank	Excluded (EX)

==== Challengers Cup ====
Pos.	Driver	(Italy) MON		(Belgium) SPA		(Hungary) HUN		(Germany) NUR		(Austria) RBR		(Spain) VAL		(Netherlands) ZAN		(Italy) IMO		(Spain) BAR		Points
1	(Spain) Adrián Schimpf	14	10	7	35	24	4	4	4	6	15	3	Ret	5	5	10	4	10	2	307 (305)
2	(Spain) Alejandro Schimpf	26	8	Ret	34	14	9	14	8	11	25	7	6	4	12	19	9	23	9	213
3	(Italy) Jacopo Giuseppe Cimenes	7	Ret	30	33	9	11	16	11	7	6	12	Ret	8	8	22	12	14	10	183
4	(France) Guillaume Maio	15	11	24	52†	13	15	20	13	27	Ret	6	7	7	7	14	11	13	Ret	157
5	(Italy) Damiano Puccetti	18	15	27	11	23	18	22	12	20	10	15	Ret	13	Ret	11	24	6	27	138
6	(Serbia) Nikola Miljkovic	12	14	13	DSQ	5	10	10	6	21	4	DSQ								137
7	(Italy) Mattia Lancellotti	5	7	14	18					13	16					9	5			128
8	(France) Pierre Bredeaux	17	20	10	4	6	5											7	7	120
9	(France) Julien Baziret	10	6	17	Ret					24	Ret	22	12	10	13			26	17	105
10	(Italy) Leonardo Arduini	16	16	22	16	19	14			14	7					Ret	DNS			70
11	(Italy) Ludovico Longoni	45†	35	54	39					26	14					20	13	24	16	49
12	(Spain) Mariano Alonso							15	9					16	10					36
13	(Netherlands) Martijn Kool							24	17					14	4					35
14	(Hungary) Tim Gábor	19	Ret			15	7													24
15	(Denmark) Mathias Dall							31	18					12	11					18
16	(France) Thomas Compain							29	14											6
17	(France) Mickael Carree	25	19	Ret	DNS															2
18	(Norway) Knut Eirik Knudsen													Ret	25					2
-	(Slovenia) Jaka Marinsek	31	34																	0
-	(Serbia) Ivan Mandić	39	Ret																	0
Pos.	Driver	(Italy) MON		(Belgium) SPA		(Hungary) HUN		(Germany) NUR		(Austria) RBR		(Spain) VAL		(Netherlands) ZAN		(Italy) IMO		(Spain) BAR		Points

Colour	Result
Gold	Winner
Silver	Second place
Bronze	Third place
Green	Points classification
Blue	Non-points classification
Blue	Non-classified finish (NC)
Purple	Retired, not classified (Ret)
Red	Did not qualify (DNQ)
Red	Did not pre-qualify (DNPQ)
Black	Disqualified (DSQ)
White	Did not start (DNS)
White	Withdrew (WD)
White	Race cancelled (C)
Blank	Did not practice (DNP)
Blank	Did not arrive (DNA)
Blank	Excluded (EX)

==== Racers Cup ====
Pos.	Driver	(Italy) MON		(Belgium) SPA		(Hungary) HUN		(Germany) NUR		(Austria) RBR		(Spain) VAL		(Netherlands) ZAN		(Italy) IMO		(Spain) BAR		Points
1	(Netherlands) René Steenmetz	29	Ret	20	25	16	21	17	26	12	28	14	11	15	16	15	Ret	17	12	262
2	(Italy) Luca Franca	4	40†	11	2	12	12			5	2					2	8	21	39	257
3	(Netherlands) Stephan Polderman	Ret	Ret	21	31	20	24	23	15	15	11	17	10	11	21	17	14	15	28	248
4	(France) Lionel Viguier	46†	39	29	15	Ret	23	18	20	25	18	10	8	17	18	18	28	20	13	240 (246)
5	(France) Benjamin Cauvas	32	33	Ret	21	18	19							21	14			27	18	131
6	(Italy) Quinto Stefana	44†	Ret							28	22	16	13	18	9	21	22			110
7	(France) Michel Faye							33	Ret			24	19	22	22	29	25	36	Ret	76
8	(Italy) Daniele Pasquali	33	37	51	48					32	24					32	26			69
9	(Italy) Alex Lancellotti	Ret	Ret	Ret	17					23	12					5	Ret			60
10	(Spain) Gabriel Alonso							34	28			23	17	23	23					52
11	(Italy) Andrea Chierichetti	35	32	48	51															49
12	(Germany) Udo Brunner							35	30	35	26			24	24					36
Pos.	Driver	(Italy) MON		(Belgium) SPA		(Hungary) HUN		(Germany) NUR		(Austria) RBR		(Spain) VAL		(Netherlands) ZAN		(Italy) IMO		(Spain) BAR		Points

Colour	Result
Gold	Winner
Silver	Second place
Bronze	Third place
Green	Points classification
Blue	Non-points classification
Blue	Non-classified finish (NC)
Purple	Retired, not classified (Ret)
Red	Did not qualify (DNQ)
Red	Did not pre-qualify (DNPQ)
Black	Disqualified (DSQ)
White	Did not start (DNS)
White	Withdrew (WD)
White	Race cancelled (C)
Blank	Did not practice (DNP)
Blank	Did not arrive (DNA)
Blank	Excluded (EX)

=== Clio Cup France ===
Pos.	Driver	(France) NOG		(France) MAG		(Belgium) SPA		(Germany) NUR		(France) LEC		(Spain) BAR		Points
1	(France) David Pouget	3	5	1	1	2	10	2	2	4	1	3	3	500 (533)
2	(France) Nicolas Milan	1	2	2	2	9	6	6	3	3	3	4	4	480 (513)
3	(France) Alexandre Albouy	2	4	4	8	8	42			2	5	11	31	330
4	(France) Jeremy Bordagaray	7	18	7	4	28	37	13	10	10	13	22	15	303 (317)
5	(France) Florian Venturi	10	15	27	9	12	7	19	25	13	17	18	29	288 (294)
6	(France) Alexandre Finkelstein	4	3	3	3	6	38	1	Ret			35	Ret	275
7	(France) Lionel Viguier	11	12			29	15	18	20	29	20	20	13	257
8	(France) Fabien Julia	14	10	13	14	37	29	Ret	DNS	26	24	19	14	225
9	(France) Aurelien Renet	29†	6	5	5	15	Ret	11	Ret	6	23			209
10	(France) Florian Coruble	6	Ret	6	10	18	Ret			8	Ret	12	8	202
11	(France) Samuel Chaligne	22	17	21	Ret	49	28	30	24	27	31	29	21	197
12	(France) Raphael Cuadrado	16	20	20	21	31	46	25	23	Ret	30			150
13	(France) Veenesh Shunker	28	21	25	24	52	47	32	27	28	28	Ret	26	150 (153)
14	(France) Laurent Dziadus	15	13	17	Ret	33	30	21	Ret					112
15	(France) Mickael Carree	12	11	14	11	Ret	DNS							90
16	(France) "HORN"			16	16							Ret	20	58
17	(France) Cédric Delcroix	13	Ret	19	17									46
18	(France) Stéphane Nevers	24	Ret							34	34			34
19	(France) Gaël Rostant	27	22							Ret	Ret	30	Ret	30
20	(France) Yann-Maël Navillod	17	Ret											10
Delisted from championship
-	(Spain) Gabriel Alonso					53	49							-
-	(Spain) Mariano Alonso					Ret	Ret							-
Pos.	Driver	(France) NOG		(France) MAG		(Belgium) SPA		(Germany) NUR		(France) LEC		(Spain) BAR		Points

Colour	Result
Gold	Winner
Silver	Second place
Bronze	Third place
Green	Points classification
Blue	Non-points classification
Blue	Non-classified finish (NC)
Purple	Retired, not classified (Ret)
Red	Did not qualify (DNQ)
Red	Did not pre-qualify (DNPQ)
Black	Disqualified (DSQ)
White	Did not start (DNS)
White	Withdrew (WD)
White	Race cancelled (C)
Blank	Did not practice (DNP)
Blank	Did not arrive (DNA)
Blank	Excluded (EX)

==== Challengers Cup ====
Pos.	Driver	(France) NOG		(France) MAG		(Belgium) SPA		(Germany) NUR		(France) LEC		(Spain) BAR		Points
1	(France) Florian Venturi	10	15	27	9	12	7	19	25	13	17	18	29	201 (211)
2	(France) Alexandre Finkelstein	4	3	3	3	6	38	1	Ret			35	Ret	183
3	(France) Aurelien Renet	29†	6	5	5	15	Ret	11	Ret	6	23			140
4	(France) Florian Coruble	6	Ret	6	10	18	Ret			8	Ret	12	8	125
5	(France) Mickael Carree	12	11	14	11	Ret	DNS							49
Delisted from championship
-	(Spain) Mariano Alonso					Ret	Ret							-
Pos.	Driver	(France) NOG		(France) MAG		(Belgium) SPA		(Germany) NUR		(France) LEC		(Spain) BAR		Points

Colour	Result
Gold	Winner
Silver	Second place
Bronze	Third place
Green	Points classification
Blue	Non-points classification
Blue	Non-classified finish (NC)
Purple	Retired, not classified (Ret)
Red	Did not qualify (DNQ)
Red	Did not pre-qualify (DNPQ)
Black	Disqualified (DSQ)
White	Did not start (DNS)
White	Withdrew (WD)
White	Race cancelled (C)
Blank	Did not practice (DNP)
Blank	Did not arrive (DNA)
Blank	Excluded (EX)

==== Racers Cup ====
Pos.	Driver	(France) NOG		(France) MAG		(Belgium) SPA		(Germany) NUR		(France) LEC		(Spain) BAR		Points
1	(France) Jeremy Bordagaray	7	18	7	4	28	37	13	10	10	13	22	15	240 (250)
2	(France) Lionel Viguier	11	12			29	15	18	20	29	20	20	13	186
3	(France) Fabien Julia	14	10	13	14	37	29	Ret	DNS	26	24	19	14	174
4	(France) Samuel Chaligne	22	17	21	Ret	49	28	30	24	27	31	29	21	113
5	(France) Raphael Cuadrado	16	20	20	21	31	46	25	23	Ret	30			94
6	(France) Veenesh Shunker	28	21	25	24	52	47	32	27	28	28	Ret	26	82
7	(France) Laurent Dziadus	15	13	17	Ret	33	30	21	Ret					76
8	(France) "HORN"			16	16							Ret	20	42
9	(France) Cédric Delcroix	13	Ret	19	17									37
10	(France) Gaël Rostant	27	22							Ret	Ret	30	Ret	21
11	(France) Stéphane Nevers	24	Ret							34	34			16
12	(France) Yann-Maël Navillod	17	Ret											6
Delisted from championship
-	(Spain) Gabriel Alonso					53	49							-
Pos.	Driver	(France) NOG		(France) MAG		(Belgium) SPA		(Germany) NUR		(France) LEC		(Spain) BAR		Points

Colour	Result
Gold	Winner
Silver	Second place
Bronze	Third place
Green	Points classification
Blue	Non-points classification
Blue	Non-classified finish (NC)
Purple	Retired, not classified (Ret)
Red	Did not qualify (DNQ)
Red	Did not pre-qualify (DNPQ)
Black	Disqualified (DSQ)
White	Did not start (DNS)
White	Withdrew (WD)
White	Race cancelled (C)
Blank	Did not practice (DNP)
Blank	Did not arrive (DNA)
Blank	Excluded (EX)

=== Clio Cup España ===
Pos.	Driver	(France) NOG		(France) MAG		(Spain) VAL		(France) LEC		(Spain) BAR		Points
1	(Spain) Adrián Schimpf	5	8	9	6	3	Ret	5	2	10	2	406
2	(Spain) Alejandro Schimpf	8	7	8	12	7	6	11	9	23	9	350 (383)
3	(France) Jeremy Bordagaray	7	18	7	4	11	20	10	13	22	15	340 (362)
4	(Spain) Jordi Palomeras	20	14	11	13	4	Ret			5	5	274
5	(Spain) Alejandro Romero	25	19	22	23	19	14	31	Ret	28	32	224
6	(Spain) Lydia Sempere	26	25	26	22	18	15	39	36	34	25	206 (224)
7	(Spain) Joaquin Rodrigo	23	23	23	20	19	16	33	35	33	Ret	198 (218)
8	(France) Jean-Louis Carponcin					21	18	36	33	31	24	156
9	(France) Matthieu Lannepoudenx	9	1	10	7							152
10	(Spain) Sergio Casalins	19	16	15	15							114
11	(France) Michel Faye					24	19	37	37	36	Ret	106
12	(Spain) Alex Royo					8	Ret			16	11	102
13	(Spain) Javier Cicuendez	21	24	18	18							92
14	(Spain) Iván Hernández					13	9					69
Pos.	Driver	(France) NOG		(France) MAG		(Spain) VAL		(France) LEC		(Spain) BAR		Points

Colour	Result
Gold	Winner
Silver	Second place
Bronze	Third place
Green	Points classification
Blue	Non-points classification
Blue	Non-classified finish (NC)
Purple	Retired, not classified (Ret)
Red	Did not qualify (DNQ)
Red	Did not pre-qualify (DNPQ)
Black	Disqualified (DSQ)
White	Did not start (DNS)
White	Withdrew (WD)
White	Race cancelled (C)
Blank	Did not practice (DNP)
Blank	Did not arrive (DNA)
Blank	Excluded (EX)

==== Challengers Cup ====
Pos.	Driver	(France) NOG		(France) MAG		(Spain) VAL		(France) LEC		(Spain) BAR		Points
1	(Spain) Adrián Schimpf	5	8	9	6	3	Ret	5	2	10	2	201
2	(Spain) Alejandro Schimpf	8	7	8	12	7	6	11	9	23	9	167 (182)
3	(Spain) Jordi Palomeras	20	14	11	13	4	Ret			5	5	121
4	(Spain) Lydia Sempere	26	25	26	22	18	15	39	36	34	25	103 (111)
5	(France) Matthieu Lannepoudenx	9	1	10	7							73
6	(Spain) Javier Cicuendez	21	24	18	18							40
7	(Spain) Iván Hernández					13	9					30
Pos.	Driver	(France) NOG		(France) MAG		(Spain) VAL		(France) LEC		(Spain) BAR		Points

Colour	Result
Gold	Winner
Silver	Second place
Bronze	Third place
Green	Points classification
Blue	Non-points classification
Blue	Non-classified finish (NC)
Purple	Retired, not classified (Ret)
Red	Did not qualify (DNQ)
Red	Did not pre-qualify (DNPQ)
Black	Disqualified (DSQ)
White	Did not start (DNS)
White	Withdrew (WD)
White	Race cancelled (C)
Blank	Did not practice (DNP)
Blank	Did not arrive (DNA)
Blank	Excluded (EX)

==== Racers Cup ====
Pos.	Driver	(France) NOG		(France) MAG		(Spain) VAL		(France) LEC		(Spain) BAR		Points
1	(France) Jeremy Bordagaray	7	18	7	4	11	20	10	13	22	15	218 (228)
2	(Spain) Alejandro Romero	25	19	22	23	19	14	31	Ret	28	32	148
3	(Spain) Joaquin Rodrigo	23	23	23	20	19	16	33	35	33	Ret	117 (129)
4	(France) Jean-Louis Carponcin					21	18	36	33	31	24	90
5	(Spain) Sergio Casalins	19	16	15	15							79
6	(France) Michel Faye					24	19	37	37	36	Ret	54
Pos.	Driver	(France) NOG		(France) MAG		(Spain) VAL		(France) LEC		(Spain) BAR		Points

Colour	Result
Gold	Winner
Silver	Second place
Bronze	Third place
Green	Points classification
Blue	Non-points classification
Blue	Non-classified finish (NC)
Purple	Retired, not classified (Ret)
Red	Did not qualify (DNQ)
Red	Did not pre-qualify (DNPQ)
Black	Disqualified (DSQ)
White	Did not start (DNS)
White	Withdrew (WD)
White	Race cancelled (C)
Blank	Did not practice (DNP)
Blank	Did not arrive (DNA)
Blank	Excluded (EX)

=== Clio Cup Italia ===
Pos.	Driver	(Italy) MON		(Belgium) SPA		(Italy) MIS		(Austria) RBR		(France) LEC		(Italy) IMO		Points
1	(Italy) Luca Franca	4	40†	11	2	2	2	5	2	7	7	2	8	489
2	(Italy) Mattia Lancellotti	5	7	14	18	4	7	13	16	12	6	9	5	386 (408)
3	(Italy) Giacomo Trebbi	6	9	16	12	3	3	Ret	9	14	11	6	6	384
4	(Italy) Jacopo Giuseppe Cimenes	7	Ret	30	33	8	5	7	6	20	16	22	12	288
5	(Italy) Cristian Ricciarini	3	12	25	13	5	4	18	Ret			12	7	287
6	(Poland) Jerzy Spinkiewicz	Ret	5	43	32	Ret	6	Ret	DNS	1	4	3	Ret	280
7	(Italy) Leonardo Arduini	16	16	22	16	6	9	14	7	15	10	Ret	DNS	258 (280)
8	(Italy) Alex Lancellotti	Ret	Ret	Ret	17	7	10	23	12	16	8	5	Ret	219
9	(Italy) Alessandro Brigatti	23	13	3	5	12	8	8	Ret					216
10	(Italy) Gianalberto Francesco Coldani	21	21	35	22	Ret	15	16	19	18	22	Ret	DNQ	172
11	(Italy) Sandro Cutini	22	27	42	41	15	18	19	30	Ret	21	16	19	144
12	(Italy) Adam Sascha	30	17	39	23	18	Ret	31	Ret	40†	25	23	17	130
13	(Italy) Ludovico Longoni	45†	35	54	39	21	14	26	14	24	26	20	13	130
14	(Italy) "DUE"	27	31	46	26	13	17	30	21	30	29	30	21	128 (131)
15	(Italy) Francesco Savoia	20	23	41	8	10	13	Ret	Ret					122
16	(Italy) Alessandro Alcidi	34	25			9	12	Ret	17	22	38			110
17	(Italy) Francesco Miotto	37	30	44	20	20	Ret	Ret	31			13	10	99
18	(Italy) Quinto Stefana							28	22	25	19	21	22	94
19	(Italy) Francesco Pagano	42	Ret	32	36	11	11	33	Ret	21	27	Ret	EX	87
20	(Italy) Alessio Alcidi	24	36	36	44	16	Ret	22	23					69
21	(Italy) Federico Danova	Ret	28	34	43	26	24†	9	Ret					63
22	(Italy) Manuel Stefani	38	38	47	50	17	19			38	Ret	26	20	52
23	(Italy) Daniele Pasquali	33	37	51	48	19	20	32	24			32	26	51
24	(Italy) Andrea Chierichetti	35	32	48	51	14	16			32	32	DNQ	DNQ	51
25	(Italy) Simone Di Luca			19	27									39
26	(Italy) Davide Gaggianesi							17	29					32
27	(Italy) Massimiliano Danetti	36	29											16
28	(Italy) Rolando Bordacchini					23	21					Ret	Ret	11
29	(Italy) Luciano Gioia						Ret					28	DNS	10
-	(Italy) Andrea Bonifazi			50	45									0
-	(Italy) Mario Federico Cappella					25	23†							0
-	(Italy) Rocco Romeo					24								0
-	(Italy) Ercole Cipolla					22	22							0
Ineligible to score points
-	(Slovenia) Nik Štefančič											24	15	-
-	(Italy) Davide Rosini											27	16	-
-	(Slovenia) Miha Primožič											25	23	-
-	(Italy) Donato Barnaba											31	27	-
Pos.	Driver	(Italy) MON		(Belgium) SPA		(Italy) MIS		(Austria) RBR		(France) LEC		(Italy) IMO		Points

Colour	Result
Gold	Winner
Silver	Second place
Bronze	Third place
Green	Points classification
Blue	Non-points classification
Blue	Non-classified finish (NC)
Purple	Retired, not classified (Ret)
Red	Did not qualify (DNQ)
Red	Did not pre-qualify (DNPQ)
Black	Disqualified (DSQ)
White	Did not start (DNS)
White	Withdrew (WD)
White	Race cancelled (C)
Blank	Did not practice (DNP)
Blank	Did not arrive (DNA)
Blank	Excluded (EX)

==== Challengers Cup ====
Pos.	Driver	(Italy) MON		(Belgium) SPA		(Italy) MIS		(Austria) RBR		(France) LEC		(Italy) IMO		Points
1	(Italy) Mattia Lancellotti	5	7	14	18	4	7	13	16	12	6	9	5	216
2	(Italy) Giacomo Trebbi	6	9	16	12	3	3	Ret	9	14	11	6	6	207
3	(Italy) Jacopo Giuseppe Cimenes	7	Ret	30	33	8	5	7	6	20	16	22	12	151
4	(Italy) Leonardo Arduini	16	16	22	16	6	9	14	7	15	10	Ret	DNS	124 (134)
5	(Italy) Alessandro Brigatti	23	13	3	5	12	8	8	Ret					107
6	(Italy) Gianalberto Francesco Coldani	21	21	35	22	Ret	15	16	19	18	22	Ret	DNQ	66
7	(Italy) Ludovico Longoni	45†	35	54	39	21	14	26	14	24	26	20	13	55
8	(Italy) Francesco Savoia	20	23	41	8	10	13	Ret	Ret					50
9	(Italy) Adam Sascha	30	17	39	23	18	Ret	31	Ret	40†	25	23	17	49
10	(Italy) Francesco Miotto	37	30	44	20	20	Ret	Ret	31			13	10	38
11	(Italy) Francesco Pagano	42	Ret	32	36	11	11	33	Ret	21	27	Ret	EX	38
12	(Italy) Federico Danova	Ret	28	34	43	26	24†	9	Ret					26
13	(Italy) Alessio Alcidi	24	36	36	44	16	Ret	22	23					22
Pos.	Driver	(Italy) MON		(Belgium) SPA		(Italy) MIS		(Austria) RBR		(France) LEC		(Italy) IMO		Points

Colour	Result
Gold	Winner
Silver	Second place
Bronze	Third place
Green	Points classification
Blue	Non-points classification
Blue	Non-classified finish (NC)
Purple	Retired, not classified (Ret)
Red	Did not qualify (DNQ)
Red	Did not pre-qualify (DNPQ)
Black	Disqualified (DSQ)
White	Did not start (DNS)
White	Withdrew (WD)
White	Race cancelled (C)
Blank	Did not practice (DNP)
Blank	Did not arrive (DNA)
Blank	Excluded (EX)

==== Racers Cup ====
Pos.	Driver	(Italy) MON		(Belgium) SPA		(Italy) MIS		(Austria) RBR		(France) LEC		(Italy) IMO		Points
1	(Italy) Luca Franca	4	40†	11	2	2	2	5	2	7	7	2	8	275 (281)
2	(Italy) Sandro Cutini	22	27	42	41	15	18	19	30	Ret	21	16	19	146
3	(Italy) Alex Lancellotti	Ret	Ret	Ret	17	7	10	23	12	16	8	5	Ret	138
4	(Italy) "DUE"	27	31	46	26	13	17	30	21	30	29	30	21	134 (142)
5	(Italy) Alessandro Alcidi	34	25			9	12	Ret	17	22	38			105
6	(Italy) Manuel Stefani	38	38	47	50	17	19			38	Ret	26	20	75
7	(Italy) Andrea Chierichetti	35	32	48	51	14	16			32	32	DNQ	DNQ	72
8	(Italy) Quinto Stefana							28	22	25	19	21	22	69
9	(Italy) Daniele Pasquali	33	37	51	48	19	20	32	24			32	26	66
10	(Italy) Davide Gaggianesi							17	29					24
11	(Italy) Ercole Cipolla					22	22							3
12	(Italy) Rolando Bordacchini					23	21					Ret	Ret	3
-	(Italy) Mario Federico Cappella					25	23†							0
Pos.	Driver	(Italy) MON		(Belgium) SPA		(Italy) MIS		(Austria) RBR		(France) LEC		(Italy) IMO		Points

Colour	Result
Gold	Winner
Silver	Second place
Bronze	Third place
Green	Points classification
Blue	Non-points classification
Blue	Non-classified finish (NC)
Purple	Retired, not classified (Ret)
Red	Did not qualify (DNQ)
Red	Did not pre-qualify (DNPQ)
Black	Disqualified (DSQ)
White	Did not start (DNS)
White	Withdrew (WD)
White	Race cancelled (C)
Blank	Did not practice (DNP)
Blank	Did not arrive (DNA)
Blank	Excluded (EX)

=== Clio Cup Mid-Europe ===
Pos.	Driver	(Italy) MON		(Belgium) SPA		(Hungary) HUN		(Germany) NUR		(Austria) RBR		(Netherlands) ZAN		Points
1	(Italy) Gabrielle Torelli	1	1	1	3	3	1	3	1	2	27	1	17	503 (527)
2	(France) Anthony Jurado	9	4	4	1	1	6	5	7	1	5	2	Ret	432 (468)
3	(Czech Republic) Tomáš Pekař	11	41†	5	9	4	3	7	29	4	3	9	3	406 (420)
4	(France) Guillaume Maio	15	11	24	52†	13	15	20	13	27	Ret	7	7	278
5	(Switzerland) Andreas Stucki	13	18	26	14	10	13	9	26	10	Ret	Ret	15	275
6	(Serbia) Nikola Miljkovic	12	14	13	DSQ	5	10	10	6	21	4			270 (292)
7	(Italy) Damiano Puccetti	18	15	27	11	23	18	22	12	20	10	13	Ret	254 (266)
8	(Netherlands) René Steenmetz	29	Ret	20	25	16	21	17	26	12	28	15	16	252
9	(Netherlands) Stephan Polderman	Ret	Ret	21	31	20	24	23	15	15	11	11	21	229
10	(Germany) Henrik Seibel			23	19	22	22	28	19	34	20	19	19	200
11	(France) Julien Baziret	10	6	17	Ret					24	Ret	10	13	188
12	(Switzerland) Daniel Nyffeler	41	Ret	40	40	21	Ret	27	16	29	DNS			114
13	(France) Sébastien Gehin	28	26	38	24			26	22					112
14	(Hungary) Tim Gábor	19	Ret			15	7							77
15	(Hungary) Szabolcs Lantos			17	16									42
16	(France) Marc Fleurance	40	22											36
-	(Taiwan) Lin Chen-han	Ret	Ret											0
Pos.	Driver	(Italy) MON		(Belgium) SPA		(Hungary) HUN		(Germany) NUR		(Austria) RBR		(Netherlands) ZAN		Points

Colour	Result
Gold	Winner
Silver	Second place
Bronze	Third place
Green	Points classification
Blue	Non-points classification
Blue	Non-classified finish (NC)
Purple	Retired, not classified (Ret)
Red	Did not qualify (DNQ)
Red	Did not pre-qualify (DNPQ)
Black	Disqualified (DSQ)
White	Did not start (DNS)
White	Withdrew (WD)
White	Race cancelled (C)
Blank	Did not practice (DNP)
Blank	Did not arrive (DNA)
Blank	Excluded (EX)

==== Challengers Cup ====
Pos.	Driver	(Italy) MON		(Belgium) SPA		(Hungary) HUN		(Germany) NUR		(Austria) RBR		(Netherlands) ZAN		Points
1	(Serbia) Nikola Miljkovic	12	14	13	DSQ	5	10	10	6	21	4			179 (194)
2	(France) Guillaume Maio	15	11	24	52†	13	15	20	13	27	Ret	7	7	173
3	(Italy) Damiano Puccetti	18	15	27	11	23	18	22	12	20	10	13	Ret	160 (166)
4	(France) Julien Baziret	10	6	17	Ret					24	Ret	10	13	119
5	(Germany) Henrik Seibel			23	19	22	22	28	19	34	20	19	19	119
6	(Switzerland) Daniel Nyffeler	41	Ret	40	40	21	Ret	27	16	29	DNS			75
7	(Hungary) Tim Gábor	19	Ret			15	7							56
8	(Hungary) Szabolcs Lantos			17	16									24
-	(Taiwan) Lin Chen-han	Ret	Ret											0
Pos.	Driver	(Italy) MON		(Belgium) SPA		(Hungary) HUN		(Germany) NUR		(Austria) RBR		(Netherlands) ZAN		Points

Colour	Result
Gold	Winner
Silver	Second place
Bronze	Third place
Green	Points classification
Blue	Non-points classification
Blue	Non-classified finish (NC)
Purple	Retired, not classified (Ret)
Red	Did not qualify (DNQ)
Red	Did not pre-qualify (DNPQ)
Black	Disqualified (DSQ)
White	Did not start (DNS)
White	Withdrew (WD)
White	Race cancelled (C)
Blank	Did not practice (DNP)
Blank	Did not arrive (DNA)
Blank	Excluded (EX)

==== Racers Cup ====
Pos.	Driver	(Italy) MON		(Belgium) SPA		(Hungary) HUN		(Germany) NUR		(Austria) RBR		(Netherlands) ZAN		Points
1	(Netherlands) René Steenmetz	29	Ret	20	25	16	21	17	26	12	28	15	16	237
2	(Netherlands) Stephan Polderman	Ret	Ret	21	31	20	24	23	15	15	11	11	21	193
3	(France) Sébastien Gehin	28	26	38	24			26	22					116
4	(France) Marc Fleurance	40	22											40
Pos.	Driver	(Italy) MON		(Belgium) SPA		(Hungary) HUN		(Germany) NUR		(Austria) RBR		(Netherlands) ZAN		Points

Colour	Result
Gold	Winner
Silver	Second place
Bronze	Third place
Green	Points classification
Blue	Non-points classification
Blue	Non-classified finish (NC)
Purple	Retired, not classified (Ret)
Red	Did not qualify (DNQ)
Red	Did not pre-qualify (DNPQ)
Black	Disqualified (DSQ)
White	Did not start (DNS)
White	Withdrew (WD)
White	Race cancelled (C)
Blank	Did not practice (DNP)
Blank	Did not arrive (DNA)
Blank	Excluded (EX)
