= Bucharest Ring =

Street circuit in Bucharest, Romania

- Street Circuit (2007–2008)
- Location: Bucharest, Romania
- Coordinates: 44°25′39″N 26°5′4″E
- Operator: City Challenge GmbH
- Opened: 18 May 2007; 18 years ago
- Closed: 24 August 2008; 17 years ago
- Architect: Hermann Tilke
- Major events: FIA GT Championship (2007–2008); British F3 (2008); FIA GT3 European Championship (2007); Dacia Logan Cup (2008)

Street Circuit (2007–2008)
- Length: 3.071 km (1.908 mi)
- Turns: 14
- Race lap record: 1:13.361 ( (New Zealand) Brendon Hartley, Dallara F308, 2008, F3)

The Bucharest Ring (Romanian: Bucharestring) was a street circuit in the Romanian capital city of Bucharest and was initiated by City Challenge GmbH.

Designed by famed track designer Hermann Tilke, the circuit was in the city centre, and has the Palace of the Parliament in its infield.

The circuit held two FIA GT meetings in 2007 and 2008, but the 2009 event was cancelled due to financial reasons and the series never returned to the circuit. It was announced in September 2010 that the circuit would host a round of the Auto GP championship in July 2011, with the event being known as the Bucharest GP. However, this event was cancelled too.

== Lap records ==
The fastest official race lap records at the Bucharest Ring are listed as:

Category	Time	Driver	Vehicle	Event
Street Circuit (2007–2008): 3.180 km (1.976 mi)
Formula Three	1:13.361	Brendon Hartley	Dallara F308	2008 Bucharest British F3 round
GT1 (GTS)	1:16.400	Marcel Fässler	Chevrolet Corvette C6.R	2008 FIA GT Bucharest 2 Hours
GT2	1:18.698	Matías Russo	Ferrari F430 GT2	2008 FIA GT Bucharest 2 Hours
FIA GT-Group 2	1:22.713	Bas Leinders	Gillet Vertigo Streiff	2008 FIA GT Bucharest 2 Hours
Dacia Cup	1:49.116	Andrei Tentean	Dacia Logan Cup	2008 Bucharest Logan Cup round

== Races hosted ==
The Bucharest Ring hosted the following competitions between 2007 and 2008:

- the FIA GT Championship
- the British Formula Three Championship
- the FIA GT3 European Championship
- the Dacia Logan Cup
- and was planned to host a 2007 GP Masters race
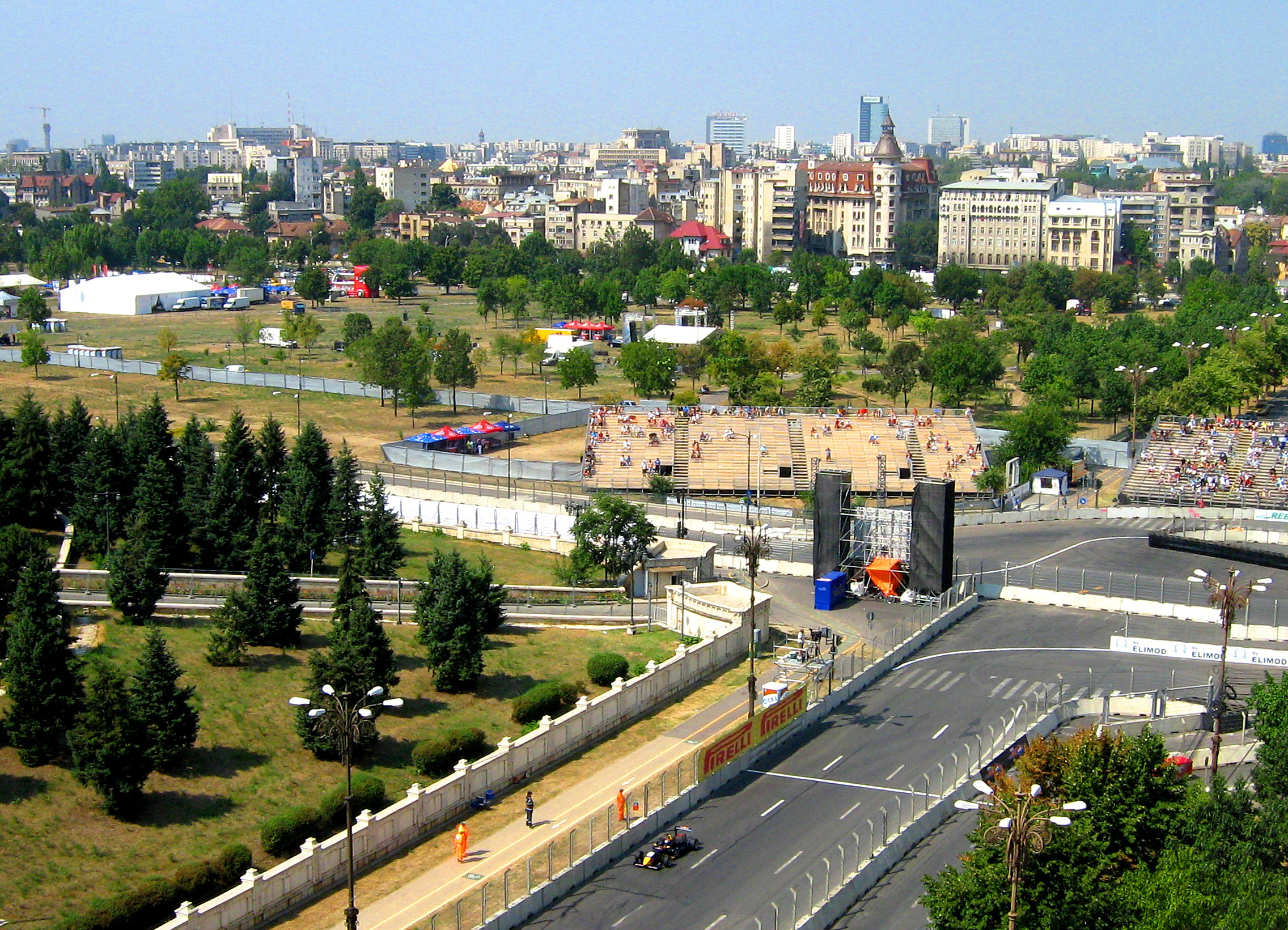
Bucharest City Challenge 2008

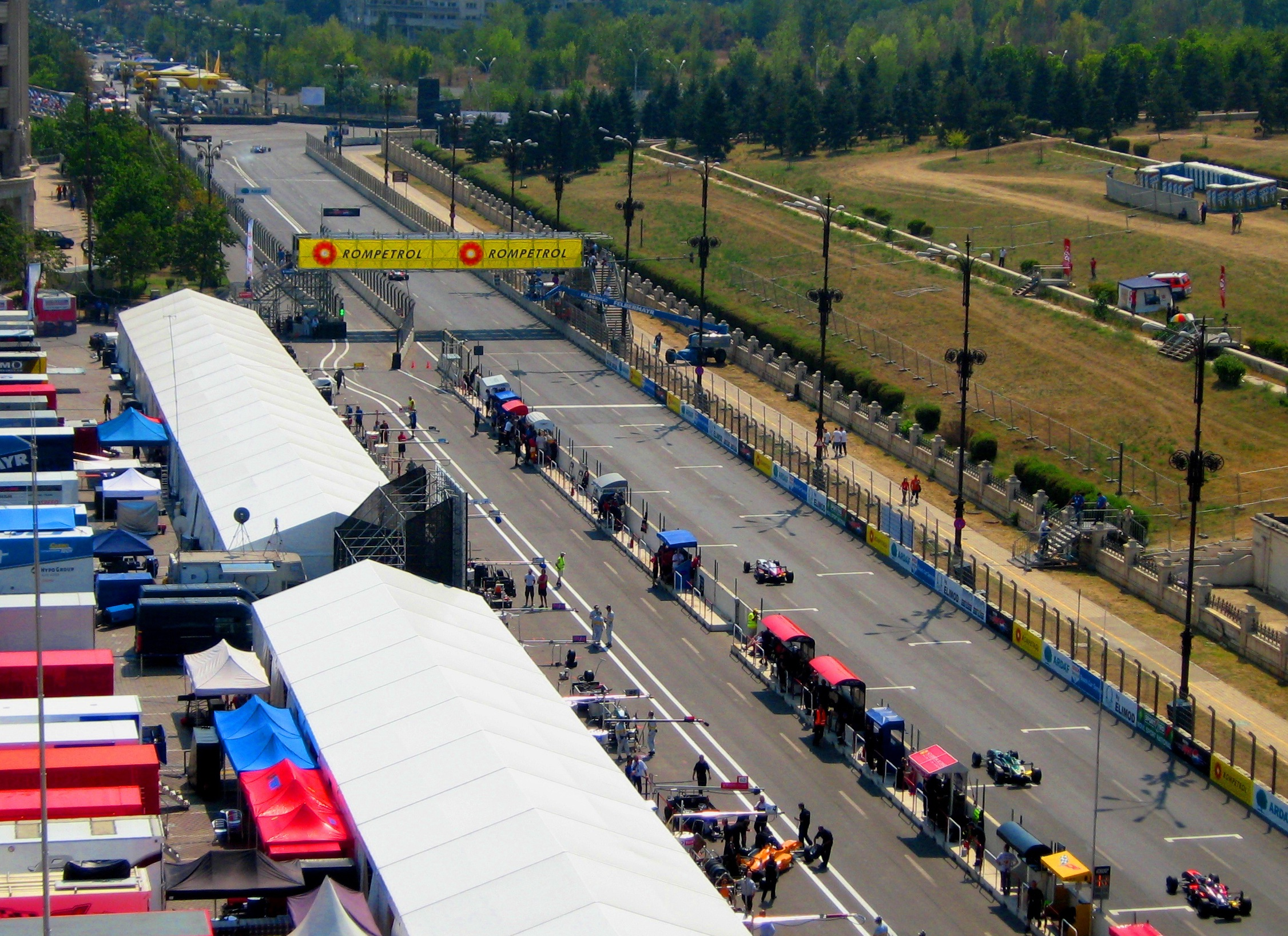
Bucharest City Challenge 2008
