= Bleekemolen =

Bleekemolen is a Dutch surname. Notable people with the surname include:

- Jeroen Bleekemolen (born 1981), Dutch racing driver
- Michael Bleekemolen (born 1949), Dutch racing driver
- Sebastiaan Bleekemolen (born 1978), Dutch racing driver
