= 2011 Eurocup Clio =

Seasons
- ← none 2012 →

The 2011 Eurocup Clio season was the inaugural season of the Renault–supported touring car category, a one-make racing series that is part of the World Series by Renault, the series uses Renault Clio RS 197's. It replaced the French F4 Championship which ran for one season in 2010.

Frenchman Nicolas Milan won the first season with ease by taking five wins and appearing on the podium in second for the other 3 races, comfortably ahead of Dutchman Mike Verschuur by 72 points, who in turn was ahead of third place Massimiliano Pedalà by 51 points.

The series featured several different teams; however, there was no championship for teams.

== Regulations ==
=== Sporting ===
- The points system for the first season were made to reflect the system used by the FIA for World championships. The top ten drivers in each race were awarded points as follows: 25, 18, 15, 12, 10, 8, 6, 4, 2, and 1.

== Race calendar and results ==
The calendar for the 2011 season was announced on 11 October 2010, the day after the end of the 2010 season. All of the four rounds formed meetings of the 2011 World Series by Renault season.

Round		Circuit	Country	Date	Pole position	Fastest lap	Winning driver	Winning team
1	R1	Circuit de Spa-Francorchamps	Belgium	30 April	(France) Nicolas Milan	(France) Nicolas Milan	(France) Nicolas Milan	(France) Milan Competition
1	R2	Circuit de Spa-Francorchamps	Belgium	1 May	(France) Nicolas Milan	(France) Philippe Maurin	(France) Nicolas Milan	(France) Milan Competition
2	R1	Nürburgring	Germany	18 June	(Italy) Giancarlo Lenzotti	(Italy) Giancarlo Lenzotti	(France) Nicolas Milan	(France) Milan Competition
2	R2	Nürburgring	Germany	19 June	(Netherlands) Sebastiaan Bleekemolen	(Netherlands) Robert van den Berg	(Netherlands) Mike Verschuur	(Netherlands) Equipe Verschuur
3	R1	Circuit Paul Ricard, Le Castellet	France	17 September	(France) Nicolas Milan	(Italy) Massimiliano Pedalà	(Italy) Massimiliano Pedalà	(Italy) Rangoni Motorsport
3	R2	Circuit Paul Ricard, Le Castellet	France	18 September	(France) Nicolas Milan	(Italy) Massimiliano Pedalà	(France) Nicolas Milan	(France) Milan Competition
4	R1	Circuit de Catalunya, Montmeló	Spain	8 October	(Netherlands) Mike Verschuur	(Spain) Azor Dueñas	(Spain) Azor Dueñas	(France) Milan Competition
4	R2	Circuit de Catalunya, Montmeló	Spain	9 October	(France) Nicolas Milan	(France) Philippe Maurin	(France) Nicolas Milan	(France) Milan Competition

== Championship standings ==
- Points for both championships were awarded as follows:

1st	2nd	3rd	4th	5th	6th	7th	8th	9th	10th
25	18	15	12	10	8	6	4	2	1

=== Drivers' Championship ===
Pos	Driver	SPA (Belgium)		NÜR (Germany)		LEC (France)		CAT (Spain)		Points
1	(France) Nicolas Milan	**1**	**1**	1	2	**2**	**1**	2	**1**	186
2	(Netherlands) Mike Verschuur	4	6	2	1	4	Ret	**3**	2	114
3	(Italy) Massimiliano Pedalà	5	25	5	13	1	2	Ret	Ret	63
4	(Italy) Simone Di Luca	Ret	3	4	4	28	3	8	Ret	62
5	(France) Marc Thomas Guillot	2	2	Ret	9	20	10	10	3	59
6	(Spain) Jordi Palomeras Ventós	17	Ret	31	6	7	21	5	5	43
7	(Netherlands) Robert van den Berg	9	32	6	11	5	7	6	Ret	42
8	(Netherlands) Sebastiaan Bleekemolen	3	5	Ret	**29**			Ret	6	35
9	(Italy) Giancarlo Lenzotti	16	4	**3**	Ret	10	11	11	Ret	32
10	(Netherlands) Sheila Verschuur	10	8	8	5	8	28			25
11	(France) Philippe Maurin	Ret	10	Ret	27	6	4	15	22	23
12	(Italy) Cristian Ricciarini	18	Ret	7	3					21
13	(France) Thibault Bossy	6	7	Ret	8	Ret	13			18
14	(Switzerland) Frédéric Yerly	13	18	10	7	9	12	14	8	17
15	(Spain) Marcos de Diego Bravo	12	12			14	8	6	17	16
16	(Italy) Salvatore Arcarese	24	20	17	Ret	19	5	Ret	15	10
17	(Netherlands) Rene Steenmetz	20	14	25	28	Ret	22	17	7	8
18	(Spain) Santiago Navarro Freixas	Ret	21	22	Ret	25	23	9	12	7
19	(Portugal) Jose Joao Magalhaes	7	13	13	12	Ret	15	19	Ret	6
20	(Netherlands) Ronald Morien	8	9	21	14	13	Ret			6
21	(Switzerland) Manuel Zumstein	15	16	29	15	11	14	18	9	5
22	(Netherlands) Stephan Polderman	11	Ret	11	17	12	9	16	19	4
23	(Italy) Alessandro Sebasti Scalera	Ret	33	9	23					2
24	(France) Frédéric O'Neill	Ret	28	16	31	16	19	Ret	10	2
25	(Netherlands) Max Braams	29	15	28	10	Ret	24			1
26	(Netherlands) Ruud Steenmetz	Ret	Ret	14	Ret	Ret	16	12	14	1
27	(Denmark) Thomas Fjordbach	27	24	15	19	18	18	13	18	0
28	(Spain) Raquel Morera Ibañez	25	Ret	19	20	27	26	Ret	13	0
29	(Netherlands) Björn Cornelissen	Ret	27	24	21	15	20	Ret	20	0
30	(Italy) Luciano Gioia	22	26	12	16			Ret	16	0
31	(Italy) Stefano Zanini	26	23	30	18	17	17			0
32	(Netherlands) Niels Kool	21	19	20	25	21	Ret	20	21	0
33	(Italy) Daniele Pasquali	28	29	26	26	Ret	30	21	23	0
34	(Italy) Saetta McQueen	30	31	27	30	26	27	Ret	24	0
Guest drivers ineligible for points
	(Spain) Azor Dueñas							1	4	0
	(France) Yoann Baziret					3	6			0
	(Republic of Ireland) Eoin Murray							4	Ret	0
	(France) Jean Philippe Lamic	19	11							0
	(Italy) Sebastiano Ciato			23	Ret			Ret	11	0
	(Switzerland) Michaël Novalak	14	17							0
	(Netherlands) Willy Welles			18	22					0
	(Netherlands) Dennis de Borst							22	25	0
	(Italy) Giuseppe Termine	Ret	22							0
	(France) Jean-Marc Thevenot					22	Ret			0
	(Italy) Enrico Dell'Onte	Ret	30			23	25			0
	(Spain) Jose Manuel De Los Milagros	23	Ret							0
	(France) Jean-Marc Corde					24	29			0
	(France) Guy Frey			Ret	24					0
Pos	Driver	SPA (Belgium)		NÜR (Germany)		LEC (France)		CAT (Spain)		Points

Colour	Result
Gold	Winner
Silver	Second place
Bronze	Third place
Green	Points classification
Blue	Non-points classification
Blue	Non-classified finish (NC)
Purple	Retired, not classified (Ret)
Red	Did not qualify (DNQ)
Red	Did not pre-qualify (DNPQ)
Black	Disqualified (DSQ)
White	Did not start (DNS)
White	Withdrew (WD)
White	Race cancelled (C)
Blank	Did not practice (DNP)
Blank	Did not arrive (DNA)
Blank	Excluded (EX)

**Bold** – Pole
Italics – Fastest Lap
