= Sebastiaan Bleekemolen =

Dutch racing driver (born 1978)

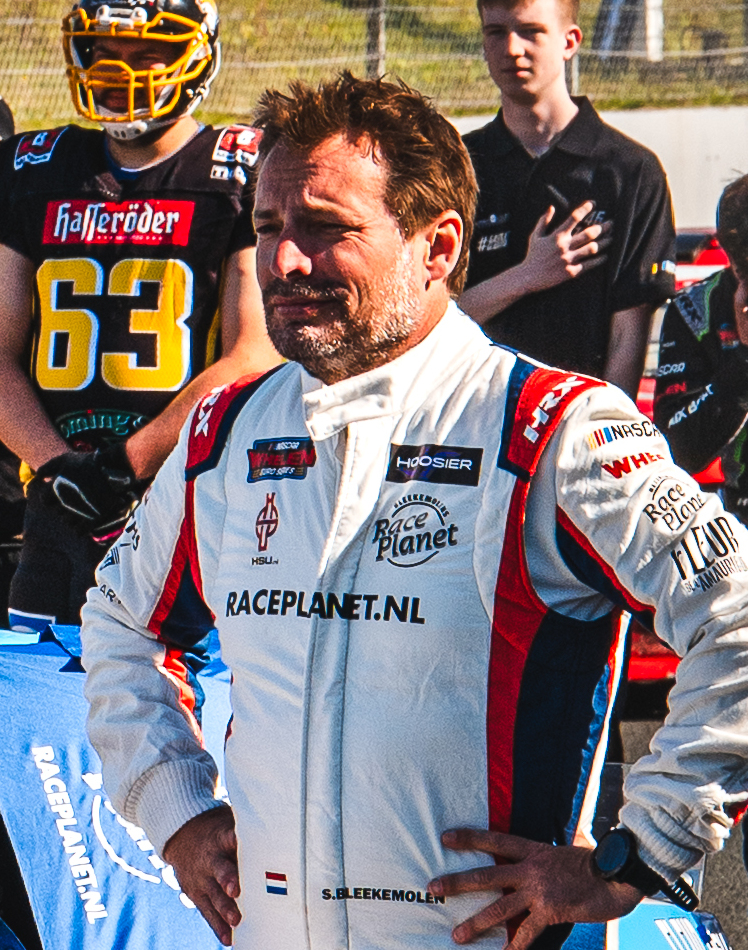
- Bleekemolen during the 2024 NASCAR Whelen Euro Series round at Oschersleben.
- Nationality: (Netherlands) Dutch
- Born: 9 August 1978 (age 48) Haarlem
- Relatives: Michael Bleekemolen (father); Jeroen Bleekemolen (brother); Nick Bleekemolen (nephew)

NASCAR Whelen Euro Series career
- Debut season: 2019
- Current team: Team Bleekemolen
- Categorisation: FIA Silver
- Car number: 69
- Starts: 72
- Wins: 1
- Poles: 0
- Fastest laps: 0
- Best finish: 5th in 2025

Previous series
- 2014–15 2014–15 2012 2011 2011 2010 2010–13 2009–10 2008 2008, 2014 2006–07 2005 2004 2004, 2009, 2012 2003–13, 2014–15 03–04, 06–08, 10–14 2002–03 2001–04, 2007–13 2001 2001 2000 1999–2002 1998–99 1998 1997–98 1996 1996: Renault Clio Cup Benelux; United SportsCars; VLN Endurance; Carrera World Cup; Eurocup Clio; Tourwagen Diesel Cup; American Le Mans Series; Dutch GT4; 24H Series; ADAC GT Masters; Dutch BMW 130i Cup; Dutch Porsche GT3 Cup; Dutch Supercar Challenge; German Carrera Cup; Dutch Winter Endurance; Porsche Supercup; Dutch Alfa 147 Challenge; Dutch Renault Clio Cup; International Clio Cup; FIA GT Championship; Dutch Touring Cars; Renault Sport Clio Trophy; Dutch Mégane Trophy; Dutch Formula Acrobaleno; Renault Spider Europe; Benelux Formula Ford 1800; Dutch Formula Ford 1800

Championship titles
- 2014 2003–04, 2009–10 2002, 2004, 2011 1996 1996: Renault Clio Cup Benelux; Dutch Winter Endurance; Dutch Renault Clio Cup; Benelux Formula Ford 1800; Dutch Formula Ford 1800

Sebastiaan Bleekemolen (born 9 August 1978 in Haarlem) is a Dutch racing driver that currently competes in the NASCAR Whelen Euro Series, driving for the family-owned Team Bleekemolen in the No. 69 Ford Mustang in the EuroNASCAR PRO class. His brother Jeroen and father Michael are also racing drivers. His father is a former Formula One driver, who has competed with RAM and ATS. Sebastiaan won the Benelux and Dutch Formula Ford 1800 championships in 1996, but soon moved away from formula racing, beginning to race sports cars and touring cars from 1997.

Bleekemolen has seen success in these fields since 2002, becoming the Dutch Renault Clio Cup champion in 2002, 2004 and 2011. He won the Dutch Winter Endurance championship in 2003–04 and 2009–10.

Since 2010, Bleekemolen participated in the American Le Mans Series. He drove a Porsche 911 GT3 Cup in the GTC class, but with three different teams. Since the merger of the American Le Mans Series and the Rolex Sports Car Series, which became the IMSA Tudor United SportsCar Championship, he has driven a SRT Viper GT3-R with Riley Motorsports in the GTD class together with his brother and Ben Keating.

== Racing record ==
=== Complete FIA GT Championship results ===
(key) (Results are overall/class)

Year	Team	Car	1	2	3	4	5	6	7	8	9	10	11	Pos	Points
2001	Team Carsport Holland	Dodge Viper GTS-R	MNZ; DNS	BRN; Ret	MAG; 6	SIL; 2	ZOL; Ret	HUN; 3	SPA; Ret	A1R; 3	NÜR; Ret	JAR; Ret	EST; 4	11th	18

=== Complete Porsche Supercup results ===
(key) (Races in italics indicate fastest lap)

Year	Team	1	2	3	4	5	6	7	8	9	10	11	12	DC	Points
2003	Team Bleekemolen	ITA; 6	ESP; 9	AUT; 11	MON; Ret	GER; 13	FRA; 14	GBR; 11	GER; 8	HUN	ITA	USA; 6	USA; Ret	9th	70
2004	Team Bleekemolen	ITA; 5	ESP; 9	MON; 9	GER	USA	USA	FRA	GBR	GER	HUN	BEL; 7	ITA	NC‡	0‡
2006	Team Bleekemolen	BHR	ITA; 9	GER; 15	ESP; Ret	MON; 19	GBR; 14	USA	USA	FRA; 11	GER	HUN	ITA	18th	23
2007	Bleekemolen Race Planet	BHR; 11	BHR; 9	ESP; 11	MON; 5	FRA; 15	GBR; 20	GER	HUN	TUR; 13	BEL; Ret	ITA; 24†		12th	42
2008	Bleekemolen Race Planet	BHR; 12	BHR; 8	ESP; 13	TUR; 10	MON; 17	FRA; 20	GBR; 5	GER; 18	HUN; 24	ESP; Ret	BEL; 17	ITA; 25	16th	44
2010	Bleekemolen Harders Plaza Racing	BHR; 17	BHR; 10	ESP; Ret	MON; 15	ESP; 10	GBR; 22†	GER; 8	HUN; Ret	BEL; Ret	ITA; 8			16th	35
2011	Team Bleekemolen	TUR; 11	ESP; 12	MON; 6	NNS; 9	GBR; 14	GER; 16	HUN; Ret	BEL; 8	ITA; Ret	UAE; 12	UAE; 14		11th	49
2012	Team Bleekemolen	BHR; 6	BHR; 8	MON; Ret	ESP; 6	GBR; 9	GER; Ret	HUN; 11	HUN; 9	BEL; 11	ITA; 17			11th	54
2013	Team Bleekemolen	ESP; 18	MON; 18	GBR; 18	GER; 8	HUN; 21	BEL; 18	ITA; 18	UAE; Ret	UAE; 10				18th	15
2014	VERVA Lechner Racing Team	ESP	MON; 18	AUT	GBR	GER	HUN	BEL	ITA	USA	USA			NC‡	0‡

^{†} Did not finish, but was classified as he had completed more than 90% of the race distance.
^{‡} Not eligible for points.

=== Complete American Le Mans Series results ===
(key) (Races in bold indicate pole position) (Results are overall/class)

Year	Entrant	Class	Chassis	Engine	1	2	3	4	5	6	7	8	9	10	Rank	Points
2010	Black Swan Racing	GTC	Porsche 997 GT3 Cup	Porsche 3.8 L Flat-6	SEB	LBH	**LGA**; 1‡	UTA	LIM	MDO	ROA	MSP	**PET**; 2		20th	26
2011	Black Swan Racing	GTC	Porsche 997 GT3 Cup	Porsche 3.8 L Flat-6	SEB; 1	LBH	LIM	MOS	MDO	ROA	BAL	**LGA**; 2‡	**PET**; 1		11th	60
2012	Green Hornet Racing	GTC	Porsche 997 GT3 Cup	Porsche 3.8 L Flat-6	SEB; 3	LBH	**LGA**; 5‡	LIM	MOS	MDO	ROA	BAL	VIR	PET	24th	17
2013	Alex Job Racing	GTC	Porsche 997 GT3 Cup	Porsche 4.0 L Flat-6	SEB	LBH	LGA	LIM	MOS	ROA	BAL	AUS	VIR	PET; 4‡	NC‡	0‡

^{‡} Not eligible for points. Bleekemolen was the third driver of the car and third drivers were only able to score points in Sebring and Road Atlanta. At the 2013 Petit Le Mans Bleekemolen was the fourth driver and was not able to score points.

=== Complete Eurocup Clio results ===
(key) (Races in bold indicate pole position)

Year	Team	1	2	3	4	5	6	7	8	DC	Points
2011	Team Bleekemolen	SPA; 1; 3	SPA; 2; 5	NÜR; 1 Ret	**NÜR**; **2**; 29	LEC; 1	LEC; 2	CAT; 1 Ret	CAT; 2; 6	8th	35

=== Complete United SportsCar Championship results ===
(key) (Results are overall/class)

Year	Entrant	Class	Chassis	Engine	1	2	3	4	5	6	7	8	9	10	11	Rank	Points
2014	Riley Motorsports	GTD	SRT Viper GT3-R	SRT 8.0 L V10	DAY; 19	SEB; 24†	LGA	BEL	WGL	MOS	IMS	ELK	VIR	COA	PET; 17†	95th	17
2015	Riley Motorsports	GTD	Dodge Viper GT3-R	Dodge 8.3 L V10	DAY; 9	SEB; 9	LGA	BEL	WGL	LIM	ELK	VIR	COA	PET; 12		23rd	66

^{†} Did not complete sufficient laps in order to score points.

=== Complete NASCAR results ===
==== Euro Series – EuroNASCAR PRO ====
NASCAR Euro Series – EuroNASCAR PRO results
Year	Team	No.	Make	1	2	3	4	5	6	7	8	9	10	11	12	13	NES	Points
2019	Team Bleekemolen	69	Ford	VAL; 17	VAL; 12	FRA; 16	FRA; 12	BRH; 21	BRH; 17	MOS; 5	MOS; 10	VEN; 14	HOC; 24	HOC; 25	ZOL; 12	ZOL; 22	16th	354
2021	Team Bleekemolen	69	Ford	ESP; 19	ESP; 3	GBR; 5	GBR; 3	CZE; 10	CZE; 3	CRO; 12	CRO; 9	BEL; 8	BEL; 10	ITA; 10	ITA; 21		8th	338
2022	Team Bleekemolen	69	Ford	ESP; 24	ESP; 9	GBR; 11	GBR; 12	ITA; 9	ITA; 16	CZE; 1*	CZE; 4	BEL; 6	BEL; 3	CRO; 7	CRO; 14		6th	346
2023	Team Bleekemolen	69	Ford	ESP; 5	ESP; 26	GBR; 5	GBR; 3	ITA; 13	ITA; DNS	CZE; 18	CZE; 18	GER; 9	GER; 9	BEL; 7	BEL; 21		12th	310
2024	Race Planet Team Bleekemolen	69	Toyota	ESP; 20	ESP; 24	ITA; 11^	ITA; 10	GBR; 10	GBR; 9	NED; 6	CZE; 4	CZE; 19	GER; 7	GER; 8	BEL; 6	BEL; DNS	11th	392
2025	Race Planet Team Bleekemolen	69	Toyota	ESP; 10	ESP; 5	ITA; 6	ITA; 11	GBR; 6	GBR; 4	CZE; 6	CZE; 7	GER; 19	GER; 7	BEL; 5	BEL; 10		5th	437

Sporting positions
Preceded by Sepp Koster	Dutch Formula Ford Championship; Champion; 1996	Succeeded by Christijan Albers
Preceded by Unknown	Benelux Formula Ford Championship; Champion; 1996	Succeeded by Unknown
