= City Challenge =

German event organisation

City Challenge was an event organisation that holds motorsports, arts, and entertainment events in major city centres. It had its headquarters in Berlin, Germany.

== History ==
City Challenge CEO Hartmut Beyer started to plan a race circuit downtown Bucharest, Romania, in 2004. After fulfilling the role as organiser and promoter for the FIA GT Championship rounds in Bucharest 2007, 2008 (under the name of Bucharest Ring) and Budapest, Hungary, in 2009, Mr. Beyer and his team performed negotiations with multiple cities around the world in order to establish its own GT championship that will take place from 2013 onwards.

== Baku City Challenge ==
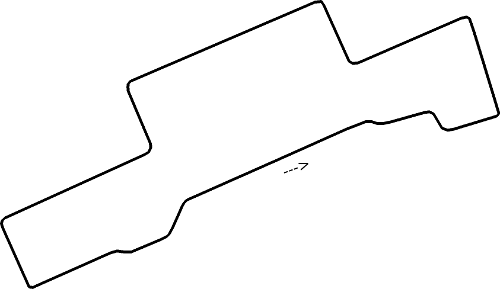
Baku City Challenge Circuit (2012)

The inaugural Baku City Challenge event was being held in Baku, Azerbaijan, during 26–28 October 2012. The event attracted 42,000 spectators over the weekend, about 150 national and international journalists were reporting about the event and 100 crew members of the TV production provided the footage either live or as highlight in over 120 countries, reaching a total of 650 million households.

On day time, the Historic Grand Prix and the Gymkhana Drift Series acted as support races of the Baku event. The evening show programme included the “CoGo show”, featuring international artists, and on-stage performances by, among others, DJ Pancho and Rafet el Roman.

A total of 13 teams, 24 cars of the makes BMW, McLaren, Porsche, Mercedes-Benz, Ferrari, Lamborghini, and Chevrolet participated during the City Challenge event on the 2,144-metre-long racetrack that was homologated with FIA grade 3. Among the drivers were five times DTM champion Bernd Schneider, former Formula 1 driver and 2008 Le Mans class winner Jos Verstappen, 1997 F1 World Champion, and Indy 500 winner Jacques Villeneuve and Mathias Lauda, son of three-time F1 World Champion Niki Lauda.

The City Challenge GT main race was won by drivers Frédéric Makowiecki and Stef Dusseldorp, driving the McLaren MP4-12C GT3 for HEXIS Racing. Frank Kechele and Mathias Lauda driving the BMW Z4 GT3 for Vita4One Racing Team were ranked second and the podium was concluded by Yelmer Buurman and Nicolaus Mayr-Melnhof, also driving a BMW Z4 GT3 for Vita4One Racing Team.

== Future ==
City Challenge would have the ambition to grow to a stable event calendar that would contain a minimum of five events in Europe, Middle East, America, and Asia.
