= Dacia Cup =

Race car class

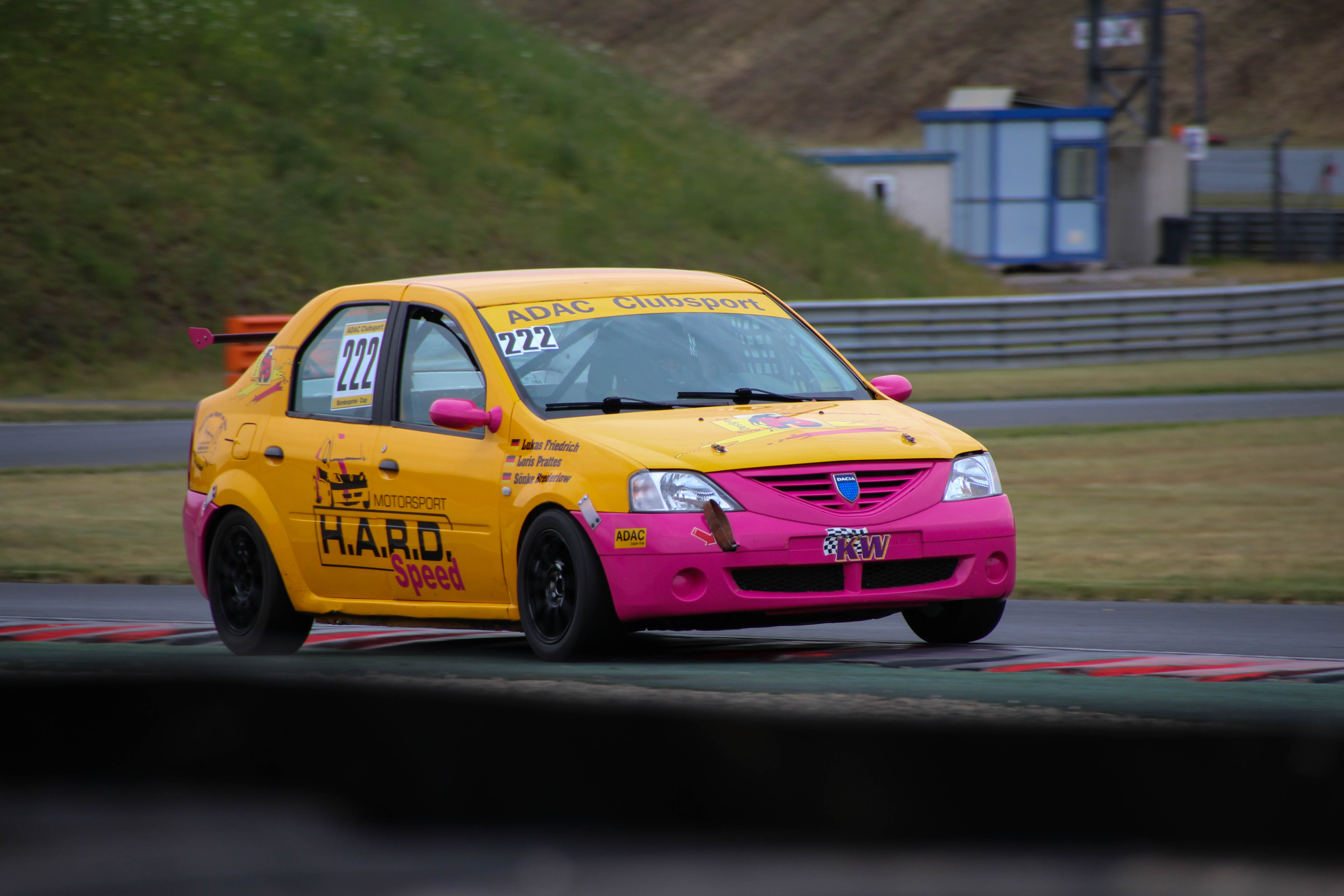
- Category: One-make racing by Dacia/Renault
- Inaugural season: 2007
- Constructors: Dacia, Renault
- Official website: CupaDacia.ro; logan-cup.com

The Dacia Logan Cup is a One-make racing lowcost series created and managed by Renault Sport. It uses Dacia Logan cars and takes place in Germany, France, Romania and Russia.

The purpose of the series is to make motorsports accessible with an as low as possible operating cost.

== The cars ==
The Dacia Logan Cup car is based on the road-going version of the 1.6 8V 90 hp Dacia Logan (Renault Logan in Russia) with an added kit prepared by Renault Sport Technologies. There are two different racing kits : circuit racing and rallying (tarmac or gravel). The kits contain safety equipment, parts designed to improve reliability and performance, and design features. The main components of the cars are those of the Dacia Logan to ensure low cost and easy procurement.

- Chassis :

steel monocoque with bolted roll cage
aerodynamic features: Rear spoiler (circuit version)

- Engine

layout: Front transversely mounted
type: K7M, 4 cylinder, 8 valve, 1598cc
bore x stroke: 79.5 x 80.5mm
fuel injection: Multipoint
maximum power: 64kW (90bhp) at 5500rpm
maximum torque: 128Nm at 3000rpm

The group N Dacia Logan competing in the Romanian Rally Championship have a maximum power of 95bhp/5500 rpm and a maximum torque of 145 Nm/3000 rpm.

- Transmission

type: Traction
gearbox: Ricardo JH3 5 speeds gearbox + reverse gear, option - gearbox with short gears and main gear 4.5
gearshift: classic H-pattern
clutch: 200mm single disc
differential: free

- Suspension

front: MacPherson strut-like suspension system with triangular wishbone, Bilstein Shock Absorbers and specific springs
rear: H-shaped axle with torsion-beam suspension and programmed deflection, Bilstein shock absorbers and specific helicoid springs

- Brakes

front: 259mm solid discs
rear: 8” drum brakes
wheels: 6x15” standard steel or Toora Competizione aluminium wheels (circuit), 14” (rally)

- Dimensions

length: 4247mm
overall width: 1740mm
height: 1534mm
wheelbase: 2630mm
front - rear track: 1466-1456mm
cx: 0.36
fuel tank: 50 litres
weight (unladen): 1030kg (rally versions)

== Championships ==
The Logan Cup car can be entered in open rallies Group N or open circuit motorsport events. Renault and Dacia organize One-make racing championships in various countries where the Logan is available for sale.

The Dacia Logan Cup has been held in Romania as Cupa Dacia Logan JOE in 2007. In 2008, the name was changed to Cupa Dacia Ursus and since 2009 it was known as Cupa Dacia. It was managed from the beginning by Mach1sport-management and since 2010 the competition was sponsored by Policolor's "Klar Professional". Cupa Dacia is very popular, with fierce competition, as it is part of the Romanian National Rally Championship (CNR) and is affiliated to FRAS (Romanian Federation of Sport Automotive).

ADAC has been organizing the Cup in Germany since 2006 as the ADAC Dacia Logan Clubsport. This championship rewards not the best driver but the best amateur team.

In France, the Coupe Logan Rallycross was organised by FFSA in 2008 as a rallycross series.

In Russia, the Renault Logan Cup rally series is supported by local Renault representatives - OAO Avtoframos, which manufacture Logans at a plant in Moscow. Held since 2008, Renault Logan Cup was private at first, sponsored by AGA autocosmetics. The race calendar consists of 9 races: 4 are part of the Russian Rally Championship, 4 in budget-minded Club Rally Cup, and one final race. Championship events usually attract no more than 5 Logans, as they are expensive. Club Rally evens are twice as popular, and there have been approximately 25 cars built (total) by the end of 2009.

The grand prize of the Russian Renault Logan Cup is free participation in the top winter oval racing (named trek) - Star Race by Za Rylem magazine, which is held each February.

== Champions ==
Season	(Romania) Cupa Dacia	(Germany) ADAC Clubsport	(France) Coupe Rallycross	(Netherlands) Logan Endurance Cup	(Russia) Renault Logan Cup (Rally)
2006		(Germany) Hochrhein Racing Team			
2007	(Romania) Cristian Turbatu (Romania) Silviu Stefanescu	(Germany) ADAC Nieders. (Germany) Sachs.-Anhalt I			
2008	(Romania) Edwin Keleti (Romania) Victor Ponta	(Germany) Ahrens Racing Team	(France) Roman Ferrero	(Netherlands) Team Erbi (Norway) Einar Thorsen (Netherlands) Piet Kroon (Netherlands) Mike van der Vecht	(Russia) Michael Skripnikov (Russia) Anton Grechko
2009	(Romania) Vlad Cosma (Romania) Florin Dorca	(Germany) ADAC HTH (Germany) GTO Motorsport II	(France) David Olivier	(Netherlands) Racing Care (Netherlands) Cristel Knopper (Netherlands) Laurens de Wit (Netherlands) Tom Verhoeven	(Russia) Michael Skripnikov (Russia) Anton Grechko
2010	(Romania) Viorel Ivan (Romania) Gheorghe Dumitru	(Germany) ADAC Niedersachsen (Germany) Sachsen-Anhalt	(France) David Olivier	Racing Care (Netherlands) Laurens de Wit (Netherlands) Tom Verhoeven (Netherlands) Iris Bijdendijk	(Russia) Vladimir Kabanov (Russia) Paul Chelebaev
2011	(Romania) Bogdan Nastase (Romania) Alexandru Popidan	(Germany) MSC Oldenburg I			(Russia) Alexey Ignatov (Russia) Jaroslav Fedorov
2012	(Romania) Bogdan Barbu (Romania) Vraja Doru	(Germany) ADAC Team Hansa			(Russia) Oleg Myslevich (Russia) Medvedev Ekaterina
2013	(Romania) Raul Badiu (Romania) Razvan Hulea	(Germany) ATT-Racing			(Russia) Sergey Alekseev (Russia) Alexander Vasiliev
2014	(Romania) Barbu Bogdan (Romania) Paler Petru	(Denmark) Pronghorn-Racing			
2015	(Romania) Bogdan Talașman (Romania) Andrei Mitrașcă	(Germany) H.A.R.D Speed Motorsport			
2016	(Romania) Raul Badiu (Romania) Gabriel Lazăr				
2017	(Romania) Mihnea Mureșan (Romania) Andrei Hicea				
2018	(Romania) Mihnea Mureșan (Romania) Bogdan Iancu				
2019	(Romania) Cristian Sugar (Romania) Vlad Colceriu				

== See also ==
- Eurocup Mégane Trophy
- Renault Clio Cup
- Sports Renault
