= Nicolas Milan =

French racecar driver (born 1980)

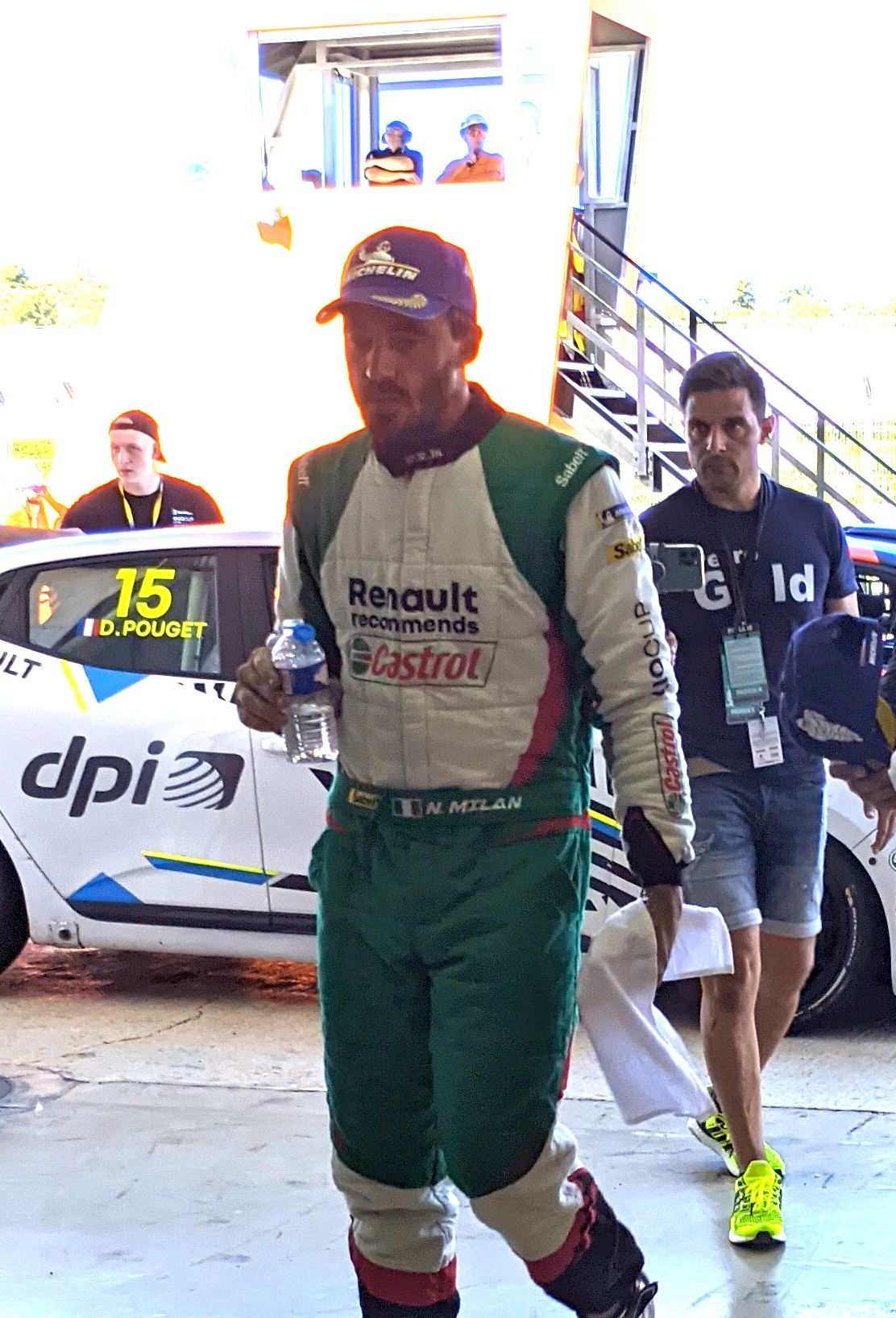
- Milan in 2023
- Nationality: French
- Full name: Nicolas Milan
- Born: 7 May 1980 (age 46)

Nicolas Milan (Cenon, Gironde, France, 7 May 1980), is a French automobile racing driver. He specializes in single-brand touring car races. His 15 titles to date make him one of the best drivers in the history of the Clio Cup.

== Career ==
Milan began his career in motorsport in 1999, competing in the French Supertouring Championship with a Peugeot 306 GTI. In 2000, he opened his workshop in Clermont-Dessous. Between 2002 and 2006, he competed in the Peugeot Sport Meetings. In 2005, he won the Pirelli Trophy and the following year he finished as champion of the French Cup 206 RCC and in the 206 Sprint Cup. He became a team manager, renting his cars to other drivers. Today, he continues with Milan Compétition, which has many Clio Cup team championships.

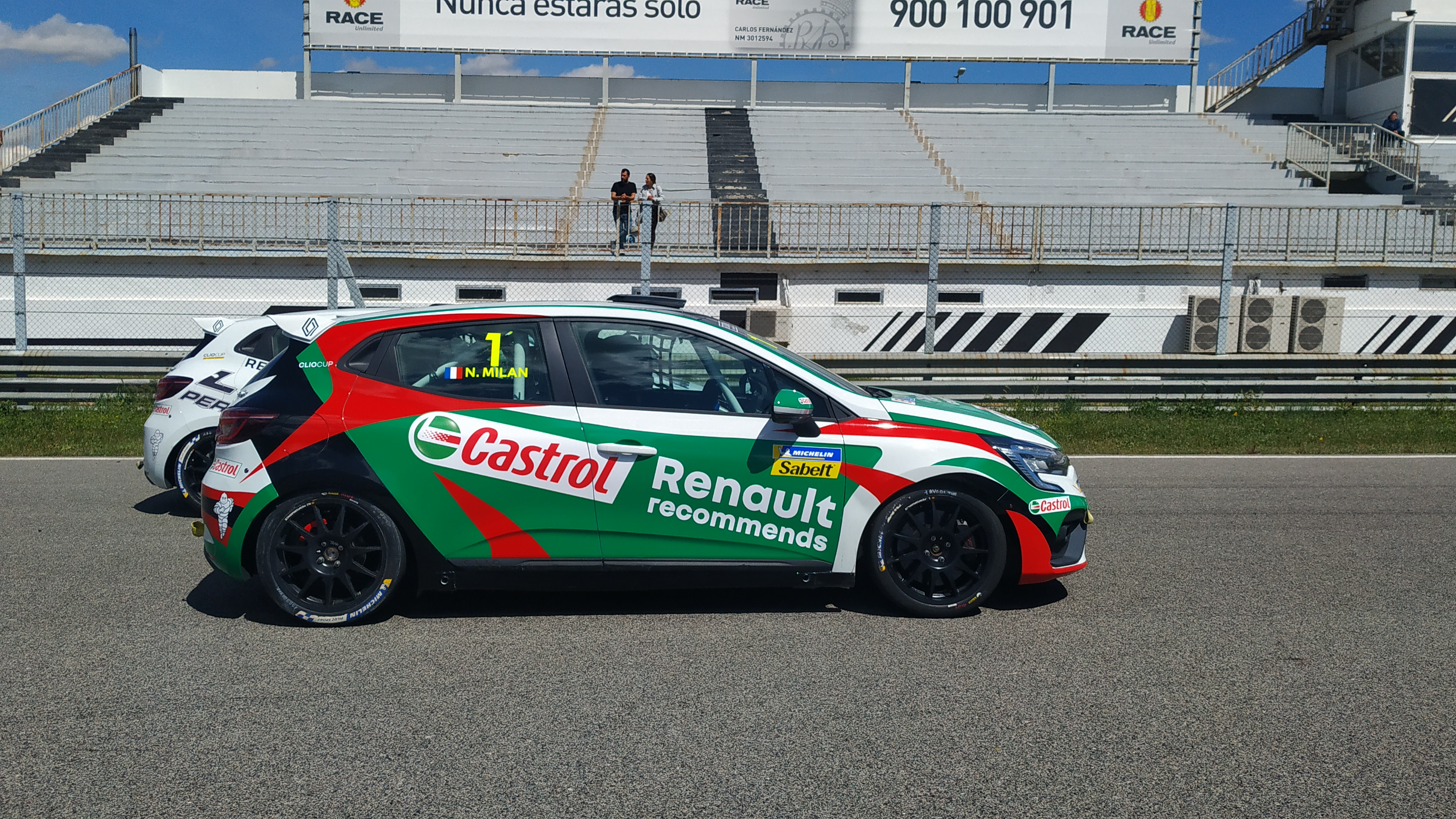
Nicolas Milan at the Jarama Circuit at the beginning of 2022 season.

In 2007, Milan began racing with Renault, competing in the French Clio Cup, where he finished fifth overall. In the following years, he improved his performance, obtaining second place in 2008 and finally winning the cup in 2009, 2010 and 2011. In 2011, he ventured into the Spanish Clio Cup, where he finished second. He win that year in the first season of the Eurocup Clio.

After trying out the Eurocup Mégane Trophy in 2012, Milan continued competing in the French, Spanish and European Clio Cups, winning the French championship in 2014 and 2018; and the Spanish one in 2013. During this time and after several seasons without racing with Peugeots, he returned to drive them in the Peugeot RCZ Racing Cup in 2013, 2014, 2015 and 2016; finishing runner-up the last two years; and in the Peugeot 308 Racing Cup in 2017 and 2018. He then moved on to the newly created Alpine Elf Europa Cup, where he lost the title by one point.

From 2020 onwards, Milan began to dominate with the Clio, winning the French competition for three consecutive years, the 2020 Spanish Clio and in 2021, he won the European Clio. He received an honorary title of absolute champion of the 2022 Clio Series, including many victories, poles, fast laps and podiums during this period. Marc Guillot and David Pouget are the only drivers capable of regularly challenging him.

== Racing highlights ==
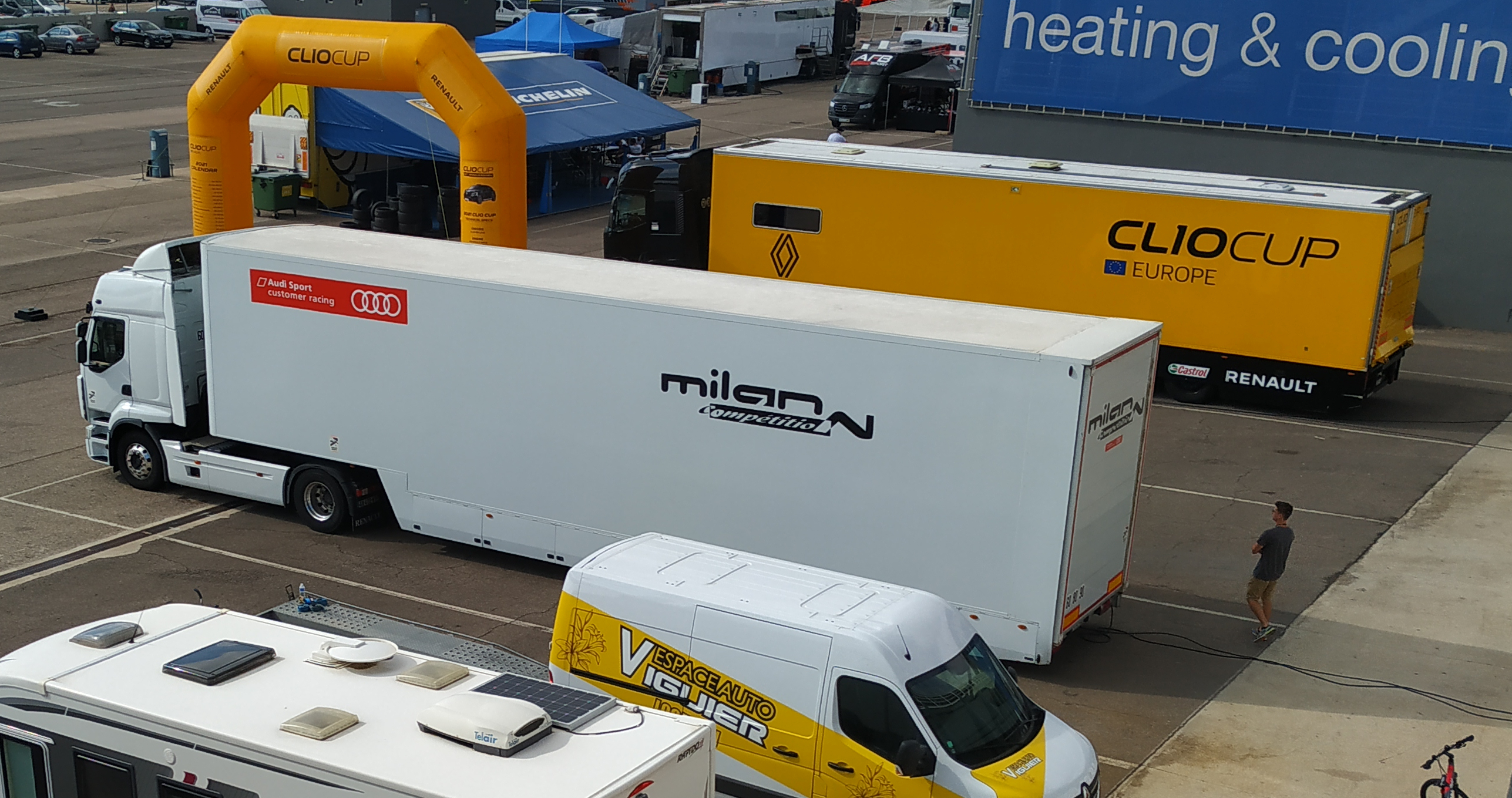
Truck of the Milan Compétition team (2021)

HIs highlights include:

- Champion of the French Peugeot 206 RCC Cup: 2006 (3rd in 2007)
- Champion of the 206 Sprint Cup (Peugeot Sport Meetings): 2006
- 8 times Champion of the French Clio Cup: 2009, 2010, 2011, 2014, 2018, 2020, 2021 and 2022 (2nd in 2008, 2017 and 2023, 3rd in 2015 and 2019)
- 4 times Champion of the Spanish Clio Cup: 2013, 2018, 2020 and 2021 (2nd in 2011, 2014 and 2019)
- Twice Champion of the Eurocup Clio/Clio Cup Europe: 2011 and 2021 (2nd in 2022, 3rd in 2013)
- Champion of the Clio Series: 2022 (2nd in 2023)
- Runner-up of the Peugeot RCZ Racing Cup: 2015 and 2016
- Runner-up of the Alpine Elf Cup: 2018
