= Renault Clio Cup =

One-make racing series

- Category: One-make racing by Renault
- Country: 19 different countries (Europe, Latin America, China)
- Inaugural season: 1966
- Constructors: Renault
- Drivers' champion: (Italy) Gabriele Torelli

The Renault Clio Cup Series is a one-make racing series created and managed by Alpine Racing (until 2020 known as Renault Sport). The championship was born after merging the 4 active Renault Clio national cups at that moment plus the Clio Cup Europe.

== National cups ==
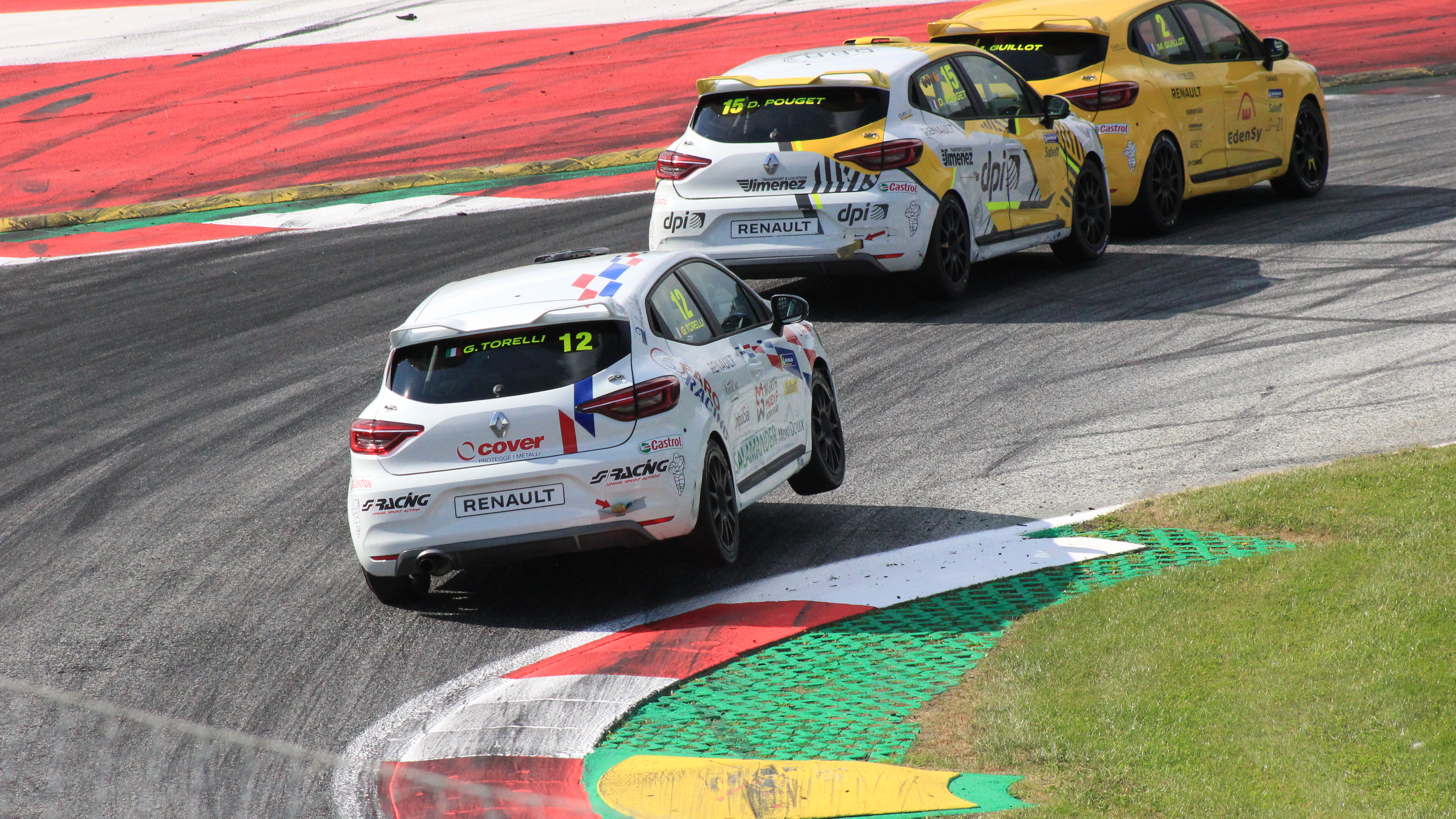
Gabriele Torelli chasing the leading drivers during the Renault Clio Cup Europe race at the Red Bull Ring in 2021

Up to 22 different Renault cups have come into existence at some point: Belgium, Brazil, China, Denmark, France, Germany, Hungary, Italy, Mexico, Spain, the Netherlands, Portugal, Switzerland, Turkey and United Kingdom for example.

=== French Cup ===
The French Clio Cup has been held since 2004.

The French Cup started in 1966 and used in succession Renault 8 Gordini (1966–1970), Renault 12 Gordini (1971–1974), Renault 5 LS kitée (1975–1976), Renault 5 Alpine (1977–1981), Renault 5 Alpine Turbo (1982–1984), Renault 5 GT Turbo (1985–1990), Renault Clio 16S (1991–1996) and Renault Mégane Coupé 16V (1997–2000). The French Cup wasn't held between 2001 and 2003.

=== Belgian Cup ===
This series started in 2001 as the Renault Sport Clio Cup Elf, but in 2005 the championship was cancelled due to the lack of participants. It returned in 2008 as the Renault Clio Cup Belux 2008 with 6 meetings.

The Renault Cup started in 1987 with the Renault 5 GT Turbo Cup organised jointly with the Netherlands. The Benelux championship switch into Belgian Cup with Renault Clio 16S between 1991 and 1996. Then it was Renault Mégane Coupé 16V (1997–2000) and finally the actual Clio cup (2001–2004, and since 2008).

=== United Kingdom ===
The series' first winner of the inaugural race for Renault 5 TLs held in Brands Hatch was Maggie Loynd in 1974. The series, was previously known as the Courier Connections Renault UK Clio Cup and supported the British Touring Car Championship. In 2024, Clio Cup GB returned to UK circuits under the MSV, (MSV Trackdays), banner.

The series previously supported the British leg of the World Series by Renault event.

The series saw subsequently these cars: Renault 5 TL (1974–1977), Renault 5 TS (1977–1985), Renault 5 GT Turbo (1985–1990), Renault Clio 16V Mark I (1991–1995), Renault Sport Spider (1996–1999), Clio Renaultsport 172 (2000–2001), Clio Renaultsport 182 (2002–2006), Clio Renaultsport 197 (2007–2009), and Clio Renaultsport 200 (2010–2019).

The series' past champion winners includes Andy Priaulx, Jason Plato and Tom Onslow-Cole. Other than that, past drivers of the series that were notable outside of racing were Andrew Ridgeley of the pop group Wham! in 1985 and it introduced actor Rowan Atkinson to motorsport, which he raced seldom between 1984 and 1990. One of his races was documented for his one-off show, Driven Man. The car has since re-emerged for a reunion race in 2004, which he aimed to compete in, but had to be substituted by Perry McCarthy, due to illness. Atkinson bought the car following the race and was auctioned off in a Bonhams auction in 2005.

=== Spanish Cup ===
The Copa Nacional Renault is the longest running racing championship on speed circuits in Spain. The championship was released in 1969 taking advantage of the beginnings of the Jarama Circuit. It was organized for much of its history by FASA-Renault and Renault Sport Spain, while in its last decade it remained active thanks to Vline, Codony Sport and Driveland Events. Its last edition with its own national regulations was in 2020, denominating itself in its last 20 years of existence as Renault Sport Clio Cup Spain.

=== Other championships ===
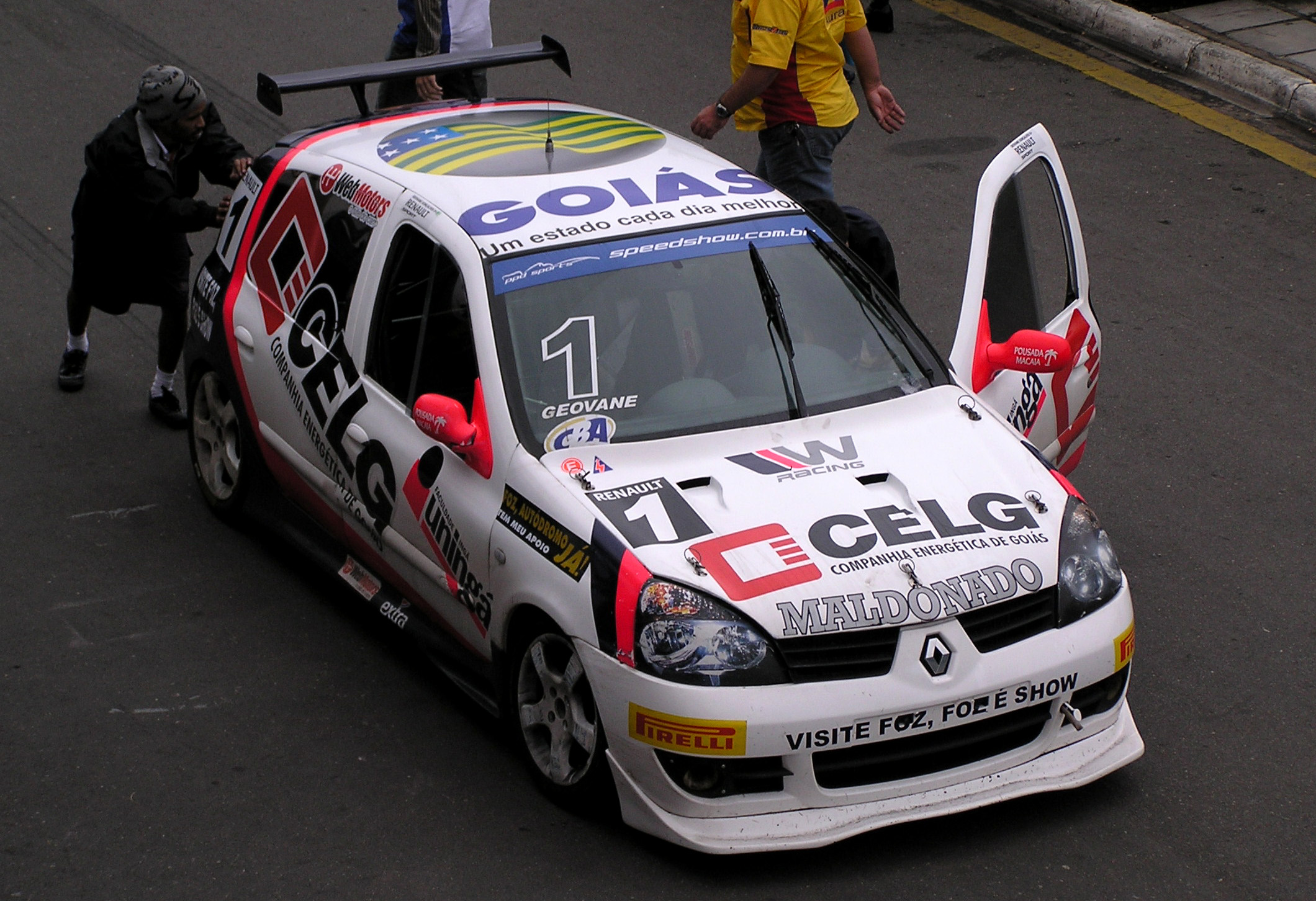
Copa Clio Brasil, W Racing 2006 car

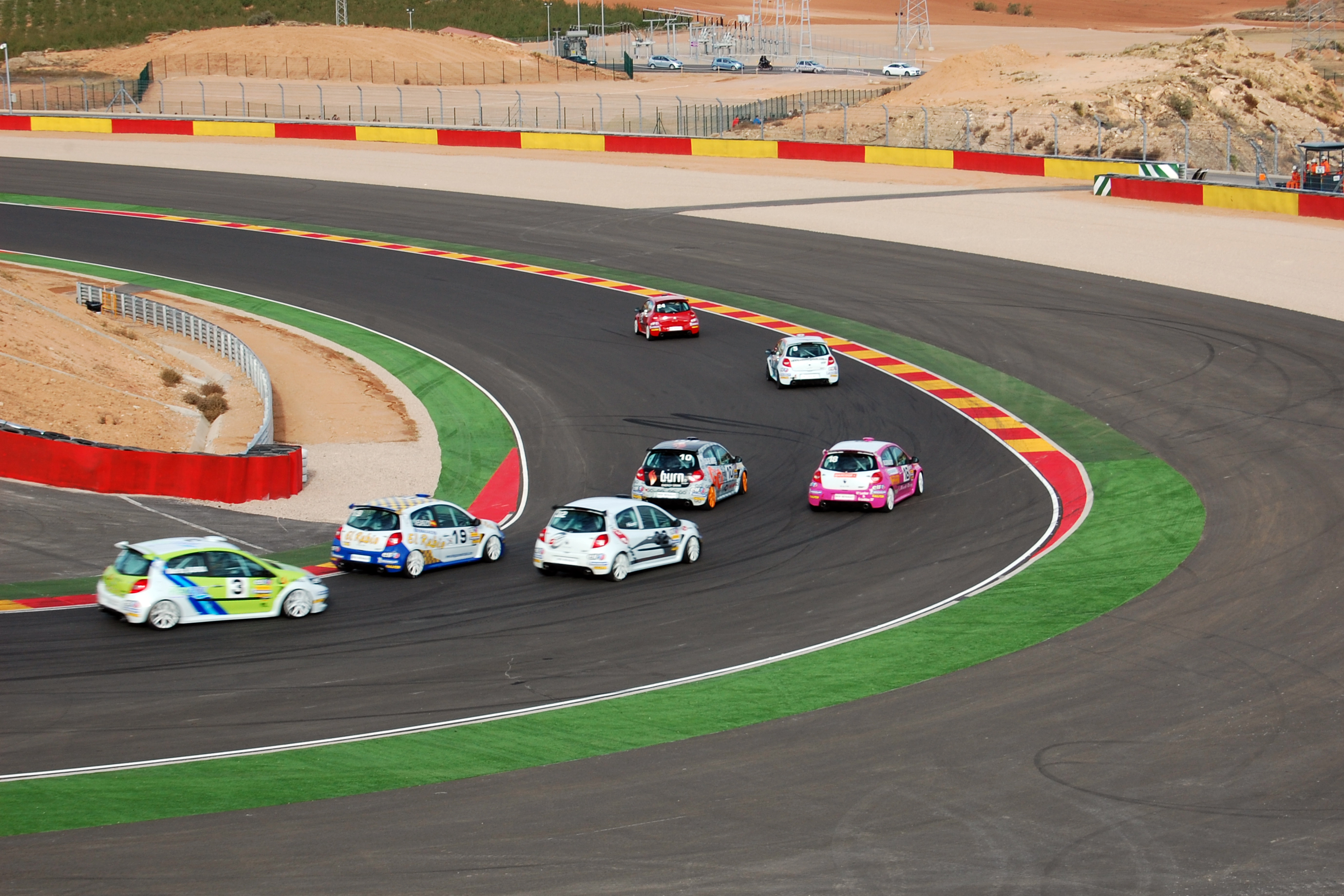
2009 Renault Clio Cup in Motorland Aragón

- Renault Sport Clio International Cup
- Clio Cup China
- Renault Super Clio Cup Brazil
- Renault Sport Clio Cup Belgium
- Renault DTC Light Cup Denmark (since 2004 as Renault Clio Cup Denmark, since 2010 as Renault DTC Light Cup)
- (Switzerland) LO Renault New Clio Cup Suisse
- Clio Cup Sweden
- (Italy) Clio Cup Italia
- Dunlop Sportmaxx / ID&T Clio cup Netherlands
- Renault Sport Clio Cup Slovenia
- (United Kingdom) Michelin Clio Cup Series with Protyre
- (United Kingdom) Renault Clio Cup Junior Championship

==== Other one-make racing with Renault cars ====
- Renault Clio V6 Cup
- Dacia Logan Cup
- Alpine Elf Europa Cup
- IMSA Renault Cup (1982–1985 with Renault LeCar and then Renault Encore)
- SCCA Sports Renault Championship (1984–1989 with Renault/Jeep Sport USA open cockpit, purpose-built cars)
- Dacia Sandero RS Cup Portugal

== The current car ==
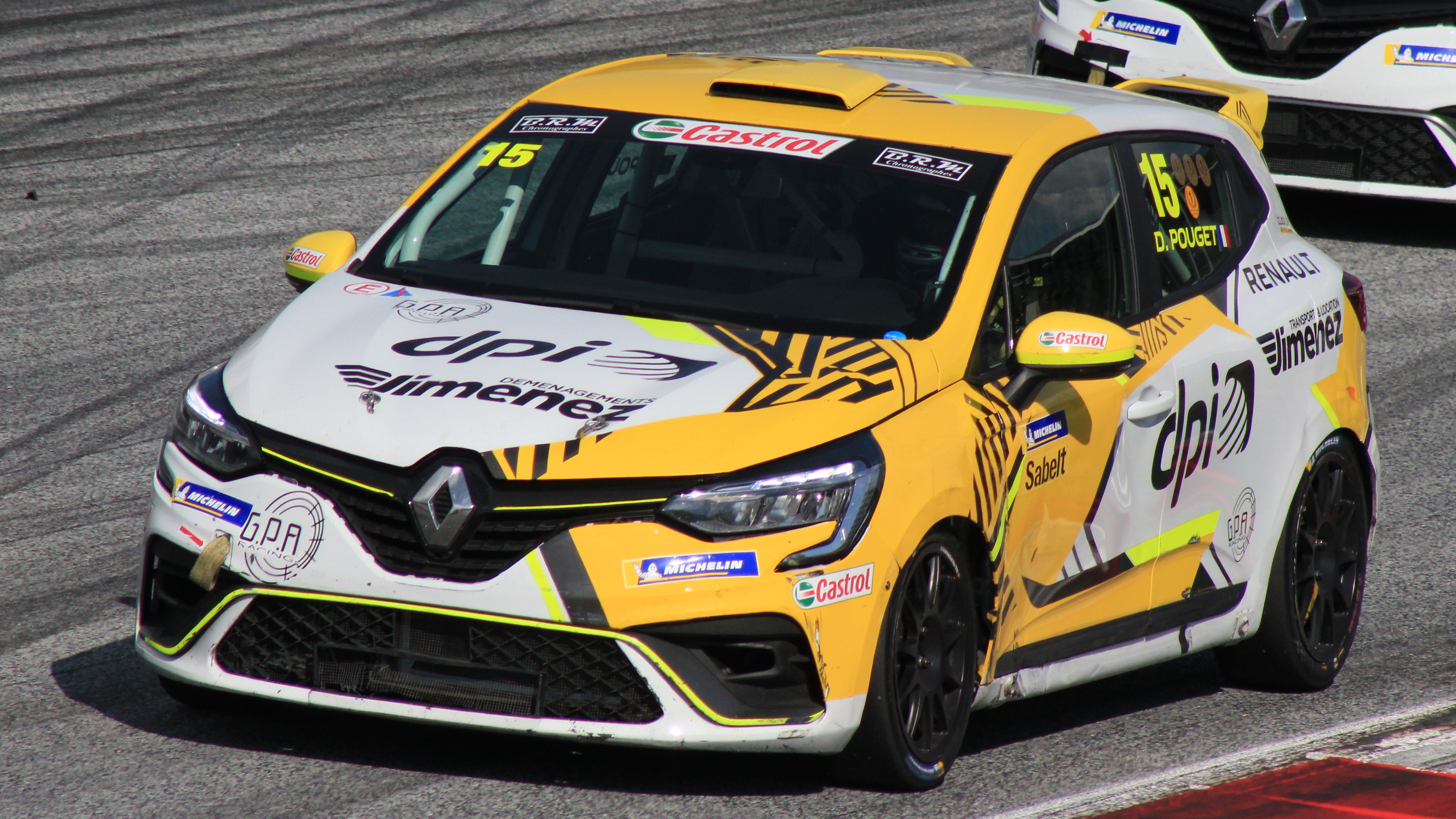
A Renault Clio R.S. V after the first race at the Red Bull Ring 2021

Since 2020, the championship uses Renault Clio R.S. V with an Renault HR13 engine.

- Engine: Renault HR13, 4 cylinder, 1330 cm3 Turbo.
- Transmission: Sequentially controlled, dog-clutch box with 5 gears and controlled ZF differentialMacPherson.
- Brakes: Discs, Front: ventilated ø280; Rear: solid ø238
- Wheels: Single piece 7 x 17 alloy
- Tyres: Michelin S9M (dry) or P2H (rain)
- Dimensions: Wheelbase: 2579 mm; Length/Width: 4050 mm/1988 mm
- Fuel tank: FIA FT3
- Weight: 1030 kg
- Fuel: BP Ultimate Racing 102 RON unleaded
- Lubricants: Castrol Edge

== Current regulations ==
Scoring system

Position	1º	2º	3º	4º	5º	6º	7º	8º	9º	10º	11º	12º	13º	14º	15º	16º	17º	18º	19º	20º
Points	50	42	36	33	30	27	24	22	18	16	14	12	10	8	6	5	4	3	2	1

== Chronology and cars used ==
=== Gordini-R5 Stage ===
Main Series	1960s				1970s										1980s										1990s
Main Series	66	67	68	69	70	71	72	73	74	75	76	77	78	79	80	81	82	83	84	85	86	87	88	89	90
France	Gordini 8 Cup					Gordini 12 Cup				5 LS Cup			5 Alpine Cup					5 Alpine Turbo Cup			5 GT Turbo Cup
Spain				8 Cup								5 TS Cup						5 Turbo Cup		5 GT Turbo Cup
United Kingdom									5 TL Cup			5 TS Cup								5 GT Turbo Cup
Italy										5 LS Cup		5 Alpine Cup					5 Alpine Turbo Cup			5 GT Turbo Cup
Switzerland													5 TS Cup										5 GT T.C.	5 GT Cup
Netherlands																							5 GT Turbo Cup
Portugal																							5 GT Turbo Cup
Other series
Spain (Iniciación)									8 Cup					5 TS Cup				5 TX Cup		5 GTS Cup
Europe											Renault 5 Alpine Cup					Renault 5 Turbo Cup				Alpine V6 Turbo Cup				Renault 21 Turbo Cup
United States																	IMSA Renault Cup		IMSA Renault Cup
United States																				SCCA Sports Renault

=== Clio Stage ===
Main Series			1990s									2000s										2010s										2020s
Main Series			91	92	93	94	95	96	97	98	99	00	01	02	03	04	05	06	07	08	09	10	11	12	13	14	15	16	17	18	19	20	21	22	23	24	25
France		Europe / Clio Series	Clio Cup I						Megane Cup							II			III							IV						V	V
Spain		Europe / Clio Series	Clio Cup I						Megane Cup				II					III								IV						V	V
Italy		Europe / Clio Series	Clio Cup I						Megane Cup				II					III								IV							V
Switzerland	(Switzerland) (Germany) (Czech Republic); Bohemia	Europe / Clio Series	Clio Cup I						Megane Cup			II							III				III			IV				IV (Central Europe)			V
Germany	(Switzerland) (Germany) (Czech Republic); Bohemia	Europe / Clio Series												II				III		III (VLN)			III			IV				IV (Central Europe)			V
Netherlands	(Netherlands) (Belgium); Benelux	Europe / Clio Series	Clio Cup I						Megane Cup				II						III							IV				IV (Central Europe)			V
Belgium	(Netherlands) (Belgium); Benelux	Europe / Clio Series	Clio Cup I						Megane Cup				II							III						IV				IV (Central Europe)			V
United Kingdom			Clio Cup I					Spider Cup				II							III							IV
Portugal			Clio Cup I						Megane Cup			II
Scandinavia	Denmark			Clio Cup I												II				III
Scandinavia	Sweden			Clio Cup I																				III		IV
Argentina												Megane Cup
Turkey														II
Mexico														II
Brazil														II Super
Slovenia																			III
China																					III						IV
UAE																																			V
Other series
Spain (Iniciación/Vline)			Clio Cup I (1.4)																																	V
Europe				Renault Clio Cup				Spider Elf Trophy			R.S. Clio Trophy												Eurocup Clio							Alpine Elf Cup
Europe																Megane Trophy										R.S. Trophy

== Champions (Clio V Stage) ==
Clio Cup Series						Clio Cup Middle East
Year	(France)	(Spain)	(Italy)	Eastern Europe	(Europe)	(United Arab Emirates)
2021	Clio Cup Europe (Overall): (France) Nicolas Milan					
2021	(France) Nicolas Milan	(France) Nicolas Milan	(France) Marc Guillot	(France) Marc Guillot		
2022	Clio Cup Series (Super-winner): (France) Nicolas Milan					
2022	(France) Nicolas Milan	(Spain) Álex Royo	(Italy) Gabriele Torelli	(France) Marc Guillot	(France) Anthony Jurado	
2023	Clio Cup Series (Overall): (France) David Pouget					(Poland) Jerzy Spinkiewicz
2023	(France) David Pouget	(Spain) Adrián Schimpf	(Italy) Luca Franca	(Italy) Gabriele Torelli	(France) David Pouget	(Poland) Jerzy Spinkiewicz
2024	Clio Cup Series (Overall): (Italy) Gabriele Torelli					(Mexico) Eduardo Miranda
2024	(Italy) Gabriele Torelli	(Italy) Damiano Puccetti	(France) Anthony Jurado	(Netherlands) Lorenzo van Riet		(Mexico) Eduardo Miranda
2025	Clio Cup Series (Overall): (France) David Pouget					(United Kingdom) Harry Hannam
2025	(France) David Pouget	(Italy) Gabriele Torelli	(France) Gaël Castelli	(France) Alexandre Finkelstein		(United Kingdom) Harry Hannam

== See also ==
- Eurocup Mégane Trophy
- Dacia Logan Cup
- Formula Renault
