= 2005 Eurocup Mégane Trophy =

Inaugural event in 2005

Seasons
- ← none 2006 →

The 2005 Eurocup Mégane Trophy season was the inaugural season of the Renault–supported touring car category, a one-make racing series that is part of the World Series by Renault. The season began at Circuit Ricardo Tormo on 4 June and finished at the Autodromo Nazionale Monza on 23 October, after seven rounds and fifteen races. Jan Heylen won the title, having battled Renaud Derlot for the entire campaign.

== Teams and drivers ==
Team	No.	Drivers	Class	Rounds
(Spain) Team Elias	1	(Spain) Luis Miguel Reyes		All
(Spain) Team Elias	6	(Spain) Angel Burgueño		1, 3-4
(Belgium) Thierry Boutsen Racing	2	(Belgium) Renaud Kuppens		All
(Belgium) Thierry Boutsen Racing	7	(Belgium) Jeffrey van Hooydonk		All
(France) Team Lompech Sport	3	(France) Frédéric Gabillon		All
(France) Team Lompech Sport	4	(France) Sébastien Dhouailly	J	All
(Switzerland) Iris Racing	5	(Switzerland) Marc Benz	J	All
(Italy) Oregon Team	8	(Portugal) Pedro Petiz	J	All
(Italy) Oregon Team	9	(Italy) Nicola Gianniberti		All
(Italy) Oregon Team	64	(France) Mike Parisy	J	7
Racing for Belgium	10	(Portugal) César Campaniço		All
Racing for Belgium	11	(Belgium) Jan Heylen		All
Racing for Belgium	12	(Belgium) Wim Coekelbergs		1, 4
Racing for Belgium	12	(Portugal) Miguel Freitas	J	2, 6
Racing for Belgium	12	(Spain) Fernando Navarrete		3
Racing for Belgium	12	(Japan) Shigeki Ebihara		7
(Netherlands) Equipe Verschuur	14	(Netherlands) Bernhard ten Brinke		All
(Netherlands) Equipe Verschuur	15	(Netherlands) Frans Verschuur		1-2
(Netherlands) Equipe Verschuur	15	(Netherlands) Jeroen Reijntjens		4, 7
(Netherlands) Equipe Verschuur	15	(Netherlands) Sandor van Es		5
(Netherlands) Equipe Verschuur	15	(Netherlands) Paul van Splunteren		6
(Czech Republic) Auto Janák	16	(Czech Republic) Jiří Janák	J	2-5, 7
(France) TP Compétition / Huger	17	(France) Renaud Derlot		All
(France) TP Compétition / Huger	36	(Lebanon) Jean-Yves Mallat		All
(France) TP Compétition / Huger	37	(France) Philippe Macé		1-6
(France) TP Compétition / Huger	38	(France) Jean-Paul Coppens	J	1
(Spain) Blue Jumeirah Team	18	(Spain) Rafael Unzurrunzaga		3, 5-7
(Spain) Hervas Racing	20	(Spain) Juan Morales		1-4, 6
(Spain) Porfesa Competicion	21	(Spain) Santiago Porteiro		1-4
(France) Energy Racing	22	(France) Pascal Ballay		1-4, 6-7
(France) Energy Racing	22	(France) Lucas Lasserre		5
(France) Pouchelon Racing	23	(France) Ludovic Badey		All
(France) Pouchelon Racing	66	(France) Matthieu Cheruy		6-7
(France) Tech 1 Racing	24	(France) Simon Abadie		All
(France) Tech 1 Racing	25	(France) Matthieu Lahaye	J	All
(Spain) Epsilon Euskadi	27	(Spain) Antonio Aristi		All
(Spain) Epsilon Euskadi	28	(France) Jean-Christophe Ravier		1-4
(Spain) Epsilon Euskadi	28	(Spain) Angel Burgueño		5-7
(Austria) Senn Motorsport	29	(Austria) Andreas Mayerl		All
(Spain) Saturn Motorsport	33	(Spain) Victor Fernandez		All
(Spain) Saturn Motorsport	34	(Spain) Lluis Llobet		All
(France) Gemo Sport	64	(France) Mike Parisy	J	1-6
(France) Gemo Sport	65	(Switzerland) Pierre Hirschi		2, 4-7
(France) Gemo Sport	65	(France) Bruno Bazaud		3

Icon	Class
J	Junior Class

== Race calendar and results ==
Round		Circuit	Date	Pole position	Fastest lap	Winning driver	Winning team
1	R1	(Spain) Circuit Ricardo Tormo, Valencia	4 June	(France) Renaud Derlot	(Belgium) Jan Heylen	(Belgium) Jan Heylen	Racing for Belgium
1	R2	(Spain) Circuit Ricardo Tormo, Valencia	5 June	(Belgium) Jan Heylen	(Belgium) Jan Heylen	(Belgium) Jan Heylen	Racing for Belgium
2	R1	(France) Bugatti Circuit, Le Mans	10 July	(Italy) Nicola Gianniberti	(France) Matthieu Lahaye	(France) Renaud Derlot	(France) TP Compétition / Huger
2	R2	(France) Bugatti Circuit, Le Mans	10 July	(France) Renaud Derlot	(France) Renaud Derlot	(Belgium) Jan Heylen	Racing for Belgium
3	R1	(Spain) Circuito Urbano Bilbao	16 July	(Belgium) Jan Heylen	(Belgium) Jan Heylen	(Belgium) Jan Heylen	Racing for Belgium
3	R2	(Spain) Circuito Urbano Bilbao	17 July	Cancelled (Note: The second qualifying at Bilbao was cancelled due to repeated driving over the kerbs; it was weakening elements of the cars' suspension. The drivers started in the finishing order of the first race.)	(Italy) Nicola Gianniberti	(Belgium) Jan Heylen	Racing for Belgium
4	R1	(Germany) Motorsport Arena Oschersleben	6 August	(Portugal) César Campaniço	(Italy) Nicola Gianniberti	(Portugal) César Campaniço	Racing for Belgium
4	R2	(Germany) Motorsport Arena Oschersleben	7 August	(France) Renaud Derlot	(Portugal) César Campaniço	(Belgium) Jeffrey van Hooydonk	(Belgium) Thierry Boutsen Racing
5	R1	(United Kingdom) Donington Park	10 September	(Belgium) Jan Heylen	(Belgium) Jan Heylen	(Belgium) Jan Heylen	Racing for Belgium
5	R2	(United Kingdom) Donington Park	11 September	(Belgium) Jeffrey van Hooydonk	(Belgium) Jan Heylen	(France) Ludovic Badey	(France) Pouchelon Racing
6	R1	(Portugal) Autódromo do Estoril	1 October	(France) Renaud Derlot	(Italy) Nicola Gianniberti	(France) Ludovic Badey	(France) Pouchelon Racing
6	R2	(Portugal) Autódromo do Estoril	2 October	(France) Ludovic Badey	(Switzerland) Marc Benz	(France) Ludovic Badey	(France) Pouchelon Racing
6	R3	(Portugal) Autódromo do Estoril	2 October	(Switzerland) Marc Benz	(France) Ludovic Badey	(France) Ludovic Badey	(France) Pouchelon Racing
7	R1	(Italy) Autodromo Nazionale Monza	22 October	(Switzerland) Marc Benz	(Switzerland) Marc Benz	(France) Simon Abadie	(France) Tech 1 Racing
7	R2	(Italy) Autodromo Nazionale Monza	23 October	(Belgium) Jeffrey van Hooydonk	(France) Matthieu Lahaye	(Belgium) Jeffrey van Hooydonk	(Belgium) Thierry Boutsen Racing

== Drivers' Championship ==
Position	1st	2nd	3rd	4th	5th	6th	7th	8th	9th	10th	Pole
Points	15	12	10	8	6	5	4	3	2	1	1

Pos	Driver	VAL (Spain)		BUG (France)		BIL (Spain)		OSC (Germany)		DON (United Kingdom)		EST (Portugal)			MNZ (Italy)		Points
1	(Belgium) Jan Heylen	1	**1**	4	1	**1**	1	10	6	**1**	2	3	2	14	21	Ret	147
2	(France) Renaud Derlot	**2**	3	1	**2**	8	Ret	2	**2**	2	Ret	**6**	3	2	7	3	134
3	(France) Ludovic Badey	3	Ret	3	Ret	3	5	11	11	3	1	1	**1**	1	20	Ret	108
4	(Belgium) Jeffrey van Hooydonk	5	2	2	16	22	13	Ret	1	8	**3**	12	7	Ret	3	**1**	89
5	(Portugal) César Campaniço	Ret	12	5	3	7	6	**1**	3	Ret	13	17	6	3	5	2	85
6	(Italy) Nicola Gianniberti	24	5	**DSQ**	6	29	2	3	8	4	4	4	Ret	7	Ret	5	74
7	(Spain) Angel Burgueño	4	11			4	3	Ret	Ret	7	7	23	5	6	Ret	6	50
8	(Switzerland) Marc Benz	15	17	14	7	11	7	8	7	5	6	2	20	**Ret**	**4**	Ret	50
9	(France) Matthieu Lahaye	8	Ret	11	Ret	10	8	12	4	Ret	9	Ret	Ret	4	2	4	47
10	(France) Simon Abadie	7	9	9	Ret	Ret	DNS	6	Ret	6	14	Ret	4	Ret	1	20	41
11	(France) Frédéric Gabillon	10	6	7	11	9	9	5	5	17	8	5	Ret	5	Ret	Ret	41
12	(Belgium) Renaud Kuppens	9	4	Ret	21	24	4	7	Ret	10	5	8	11	9	Ret	10	36
13	(Portugal) Pedro Petiz	13	Ret	15	5	2	25	13	Ret	16	11	14	8	8	15	9	26
14	(France) Jean-Christophe Ravier	Ret	Ret	6	4	6	11	4	13								26
15	(France) Mike Parisy	11	8	13	14	5	12	Ret	9	14	25	Ret	15	12	Ret	8	26
16	(Netherlands) Bernhard ten Brinke	18	10	8	12	12	14	Ret	17	13	16	11	14	15	6	7	11
17	(Spain) Santiago Porteiro	6	13	Ret	8	26	15	9	12								10
18	(France) Sébastien Dhouailly	12	7	10	Ret	19	10	14	Ret	15	20	Ret	12	Ret	8	Ret	9
19	(Spain) Luis Miguel Reyes	16	Ret	8	Ret	15	21	17	15	Ret	Ret	7	17	10	Ret	Ret	8
20	(Portugal) Miguel Freitas			24	10							9	9	Ret			5
21	(Austria) Andreas Mayerl	21	18	18	15	16	18	16	14	19	15	13	Ret	13	10	12	2
22	(France) Lucas Lasserre									9	12						2
23	(Netherlands) Frans Verschuur	17	15	Ret	9												2
24	(Czech Republic) Jiří Janák			17	13	23	20	18	10	12	22				11	13	2
25	(Netherlands) Sandor van Es									11	10						1
26	(Spain) Antonio Aristi	14	14	16	18	13	Ret	15	16	18	18	16	13	18	12	14	0
27	(Lebanon) Jean-Yves Mallat	19	24	20	17	14	17	26	19	21	17	15	16	16	14	15	0
28	(France) Pascal Ballay	27	19	21	Ret	21	19	19	21			Ret	Ret	Ret	Ret	16	0
29	(Netherlands) Jeroen Reijntjens							20	Ret						16	Ret	0
30	(Spain) Fernando Navarrete					20	16										0
31	(France) Jean-Paul Coppens	22	16														0
32	(Switzerland) Pierre Hirschi			25	24			22	22	20	19	19	19	20	17	17	0
33	(France) Bruno Bazaud					17	23										0
34	(France) Philippe Macé	20	20	19	19	18	Ret	24	23	22	Ret	18	18	19			0
35	(Spain) Lluis Llobet	23	21	Ret	20	27	25	23	20	Ret	21	20	21	Ret	18	18	0
36	(Belgium) Wim Coekelbergs	25	23					21	18								0
37	(Spain) Victor Fernandez	26	22	22	23	28	Ret	25	24	Ret	23	25	22	Ret	19	19	0
38	(Spain) Rafael Unzurrunzaga					DNS	26			23	24	24	23	21	22	21	0
39	(Spain) Juan Morales	DNS	25	23	22	25	22	27	25			22	Ret	DSQ			0
guest drivers ineligible for points
	(France) Matthieu Cheruy											21	24	17	9	11	
	(Netherlands) Paul van Splunteren											31	10	11			
	(Japan) Shigeki Ebihara														13	Ret	
Pos	Driver	VAL (Spain)		BUG (France)		BIL (Spain)		OSC (Germany)		DON (United Kingdom)		EST (Portugal)			MNZ (Italy)		Points

Colour	Result
Gold	Winner
Silver	Second place
Bronze	Third place
Green	Points classification
Blue	Non-points classification
Blue	Non-classified finish (NC)
Purple	Retired, not classified (Ret)
Red	Did not qualify (DNQ)
Red	Did not pre-qualify (DNPQ)
Black	Disqualified (DSQ)
White	Did not start (DNS)
White	Withdrew (WD)
White	Race cancelled (C)
Blank	Did not practice (DNP)
Blank	Did not arrive (DNA)
Blank	Excluded (EX)

**Bold** – Pole
Italics – Fastest Lap
