= 2002 Masters of Formula 3 =

Race details
Date	11 August 2002
Official name	Marlboro Masters of Formula 3
Location	Circuit Park Zandvoort, Netherlands
Course	4.307 km (2.676 mi)
Distance	25 laps, 107.675 km (66.906 mi)

Pole
Driver	(Brazil) Fabio Carbone	Fortec Motorsport
Time	1:33.639

Fastest Lap
Driver	(France) Bruce Jouanny	Promatecme F3
Time	1:34.533 (on lap 6 of 25)

Podium
First	(Brazil) Fabio Carbone	Fortec Motorsport
Second	(France) Olivier Pla	ASM
Third	(France) Tristan Gommendy	ASM

The 2002 Marlboro Masters of Formula 3 was the twelfth Masters of Formula 3 race held at Circuit Park Zandvoort on 11 August 2002. It was won by Fabio Carbone, for Fortec Motorsport.

== Drivers and teams ==
All cars were equipped with a Dallara F302 chassis.

2002 Entry List
Team	No	Driver	Engine	Main series
(United Kingdom) Carlin Motorsport	1	(Australia) James Courtney	Mugen-Honda	British Formula 3
(United Kingdom) Carlin Motorsport	3	(Japan) Shinya Hosokawa	Mugen-Honda	British Formula 3
(United Kingdom) Carlin Motorsport	4	(South Africa) Alan van der Merwe	Mugen-Honda	British Formula 3
(France) Signature Elf	5	(France) Mathieu Zangarelli	Renault	All-Japan Formula Three
(France) Signature Elf	6	(France) Renaud Derlot	Renault	French Formula Three
(France) Signature Elf	7	(Japan) Yuji Ide	Renault	French Formula Three
(France) Signature Elf	8	(France) Jérémie de Souza	Renault	French Formula Three
(France) ASM	9	(France) Olivier Pla	Renault	French Formula Three
(France) ASM	10	(France) Tristan Gommendy	Renault	French Formula Three
(Belgium) JB Motorsport	11	(United Kingdom) Rob Austin	Opel	British Formula 3
(Belgium) JB Motorsport	12	(Netherlands) Stefan de Groot	Opel	British Formula 3
(United Kingdom) Alan Docking Racing	14	(United Kingdom) Robbie Kerr	Mugen-Honda	British Formula 3
(United Kingdom) Alan Docking Racing	15	(United Kingdom) Mark Mayall	Mugen-Honda	British Formula 3
(United Kingdom) Alan Docking Racing	16	(United Kingdom) Tor Graves	Mugen-Honda	British Formula 3
(Italy) Target Racing	17	(Serbia and Montenegro) Miloš Pavlović	Opel	Italian Formula Three
(Italy) Target Racing	18	(Italy) Cristiano Citron	Opel	Italian Formula Three
(United Kingdom) Promatecme F3	19	(France) Bruce Jouanny	Mugen-Honda	British Formula 3
(United Kingdom) Promatecme F3	20	(United Kingdom) Matthew Gilmore	Mugen-Honda	British Formula 3
(France) Serge Saulnier	21	(France) Bruno Besson	Renault	French Formula Three
(France) Serge Saulnier	22	(France) Simon Abadie	Renault	French Formula Three
(Germany) Opel Team BSR	23	(Italy) Vitantonio Liuzzi	Opel	German Formula Three
(Germany) Opel Team BSR	24	(Germany) Frank Diefenbacher	Opel	German Formula Three
(Germany) Opel Team BSR	25	(Austria) Bernhard Auinger	Opel	German Formula Three
(Italy) Prema Powerteam	26	(Japan) Kosuke Matsuura	Opel	German Formula Three
(Italy) Prema Powerteam	27	(Australia) Ryan Briscoe	Opel	German Formula Three
(Italy) Prema Powerteam	28	(Portugal) César Campaniço	Opel	German Formula Three
(United Kingdom) Fortec Motorsport	29	(Finland) Heikki Kovalainen	Renault	British Formula 3
(United Kingdom) Fortec Motorsport	30	(Brazil) Fabio Carbone	Renault	British Formula 3
(Italy) Azeta Racing	33	(Belgium) Philip Cloostermans	Opel	Italian Formula Three
(Italy) Azeta Racing	34	(Italy) Alessandro Vitacolonna	Opel	Italian Formula Three
(Germany) Team Kolles Racing	35	(Netherlands) Ross Zwolsman	Mugen-Honda	German Formula Three
(Germany) Team Kolles Racing	36	(Brazil) João Paulo de Oliveira	Mugen-Honda	German Formula Three
(Italy) Team Ghinzani SAM Euroc	37	(Netherlands) Robert Doornbos	Mugen-Honda	Italian Formula Three
(Italy) Team Ghinzani SAM Euroc	46	(Italy) Raffaele Giammaria	Mugen-Honda	Italian Formula Three
(Netherlands) Van Amersfoort Racing	38	(Netherlands) Jaap van Lagen	Opel	German Formula Three
(United Kingdom) Team Avanti	40	(Netherlands) Jeroen Bleekemolen	Mugen-Honda	British Formula 3
(United Kingdom) Manor Motorsport	41	(United Kingdom) Mark Taylor	Mugen-Honda	British Formula 3
(United Kingdom) Manor Motorsport	42	(Denmark) Ronnie Bremer	Mugen-Honda	British Formula 3
(United Kingdom) Manor Motorsport	43	(United States) Richard Antinucci	Mugen-Honda	British Formula 3
(Germany) GM Motorsport	44	(Austria) Clemens Stadler	Toyota	German Formula Three
(Switzerland) Swiss Racing Team	47	(Japan) Katsuyuki Hiranaka	Opel	All-Japan Formula Three
(Switzerland) Swiss Racing Team	48	(Japan) Tatsuya Kataoka	Opel	All-Japan Formula Three
(Switzerland) Swiss Racing Team	51	(Switzerland) Marc Benz	Opel	German Formula Three
(France) Griffith's	49	(France) Benjamin Poron	Opel	French Formula Three
(Germany) Trella Motorsport	50	(Malaysia) Rizal Ramli	Opel	German Formula Three

== Classification ==
=== Qualifying ===
==== Group A ====
Pos	No	Driver	Team	Q1 Time	Rank	Q2 Time	Rank	Gap
1	9	(France) Olivier Pla	ASM	1:33.942	1	1:35.218	15	
2	29	(Finland) Heikki Kovalainen	Fortec Motorsport	1:34.021	2	1:36.003	20	+0.079
3	37	(Netherlands) Robert Doornbos	Team Ghinzani SAM Euroc	1:34.027	3	1:35.127	14	+0.085
4	21	(France) Bruno Besson	Serge Saulnier	1:34.031	4	1:34.197	1	+0.089
5	23	(Italy) Vitantonio Liuzzi	Opel Team BSR	1:34.072	5	1:34.214	2	+0.130
6	1	(Australia) James Courtney	Carlin Motorsport	1:34.143	6	1:35.817	19	+0.201
7	17	(Serbia and Montenegro) Miloš Pavlović	Target Racing	1:34.215	7	1:34.267	3	+0.273
8	11	(United Kingdom) Rob Austin	JB Motorsport	1:34.240	8	1:34.459	6	+0.298
9	41	(United Kingdom) Mark Taylor	Manor Motorsport	1:34.524	11	1:34.289	4	+0.347
10	19	(France) Bruce Jouanny	Promatecme F3	1:34.376	9	1:34.979	11	+0.434
11	27	(Australia) Ryan Briscoe	Prema Powerteam	1:34.412	10	1:35.070	13	+0.470
12	25	(Austria) Bernhard Auinger	Opel Team BSR	1:34.601	12	1:34.458	5	+0.516
13	47	(Japan) Katsuyuki Hiranaka	Swiss Racing Team	1:34.627	13	1:34.489	7	+0.547
14	5	(France) Mathieu Zangarelli	Signature Elf	1:34.730	14	1:35.014	12	+0.788
15	51	(Switzerland) Marc Benz	Swiss Racing Team	1:34.900	15	1:34.798	8	+0.856
16	7	(Japan) Yuji Ide	Signature Elf	1:35.244	19	1:34.814	9	+0.872
17	43	(United States) Richard Antinucci	Manor Motorsport	1:35.250	20	1:34.839	10	+0.897
18	35	(Netherlands) Ross Zwolsman	Team Kolles Racing	1:34.962	16	1:35.457	17	+1.020
19	3	(Japan) Shinya Hosokawa	Carlin Motorsport	1:35.047	17	1:35.767	18	+1.105
20	15	(United Kingdom) Mark Mayall	Alan Docking Racing	1:35.071	18	1:35.294	16	+1.129
21	33	(Belgium) Philip Cloostermans	Azeta Racing	4:21.521	22	1:36.457	21	+2.515
22	49	(France) Benjamin Poron	Griffith's	1:38.097	21	1:37.994	22	+4.052

==== Group B ====
Pos	No	Driver	Team	Q1 Time	Rank	Q2 Time	Rank	Gap
1	30	(Brazil) Fabio Carbone	Fortec Motorsport	1:34.261	4	1:33.639	1	
2	10	(France) Tristan Gommendy	ASM	1:33.807	1	1:33.823	2	+0.168
3	42	(Denmark) Ronnie Bremer	Manor Motorsport	1:35.482	14	1:33.831	3	+0.192
4	12	(Netherlands) Stefan de Groot	JB Motorsport	1:34.096	2	1:33.835	4	+0.196
5	26	(Japan) Kosuke Matsuura	Prema Powerteam	1:34.119	3	1:33.847	5	+0.208
6	14	(United Kingdom) Robbie Kerr	Alan Docking Racing	1:34.672	5	1:33.931	6	+0.292
7	4	(South Africa) Alan van der Merwe	Carlin Motorsport	1:34.985	12	1:33.990	7	+0.351
8	22	(France) Simon Abadie	Serge Saulnier	1:34.985	10	1:34.048	8	+0.409
9	24	(Germany) Frank Diefenbacher	Opel Team BSR	1:34.826	8	1:34.146	9	+0.507
10	28	(Portugal) César Campaniço	Prema Powerteam	1:34.857	9	1:34.189	10	+0.550
11	40	(Netherlands) Jeroen Bleekemolen	Team Avanti	1:34.686	7	1:34.208	11	+0.569
12	36	(Brazil) João Paulo de Oliveira	Team Kolles Racing	1:34.685	6	1:34.423	12	+0.784
13	20	(United Kingdom) Matthew Gilmore	Promatecme F3	1:35.432	13	1:34.544	13	+0.905
14	6	(France) Renaud Derlot	Signature Elf	1:34.889	11	1:34.926	14	+1.250
15	46	(Italy) Raffaele Giammaria	Team Ghinzani SAM Euroc	1:36.001	16	1:34.931	15	+1.292
16	8	(France) Jérémie de Souza	Signature Elf	1:36.005	17	1:35.034	16	+1.395
17	48	(Japan) Tatsuya Kataoka	Swiss Racing Team	1:36.194	19	1:35.386	17	+1.747
18	18	(Italy) Cristiano Citron	Target Racing	1:36.060	18	1:35.718	18	+2.079
19	38	(Netherlands) Jaap van Lagen	Van Amersfoort Racing	1:35.932	15	1:36.366	21	+2.293
20	44	(Austria) Clemens Stadler	GM Motorsport	1:36.202	20	1:36.119	19	+2.480
21	34	(Italy) Alessandro Vitacolonna	Azeta Racing	1:37.445	22	1:36.134	20	+2.495
22	16	(United Kingdom) Tor Graves	Alan Docking Racing	1:38.237	23	1:36.999	22	+3.360
23	50	(Malaysia) Rizal Ramli	Trella Motorsport	1:37.093	21	1:38.170	23	+3.454

=== Race ===
Pos	No	Driver	Team	Laps	Time/Retired	Grid
1	30	(Brazil) Fabio Carbone	Fortec Motorsport	25	39:47.591	1
2	9	(France) Olivier Pla	ASM	25	+1.596	2
3	10	(France) Tristan Gommendy	ASM	25	+1.951	3
4	29	(Finland) Heikki Kovalainen	Fortec Motorsport	25	+3.898	4
5	42	(Denmark) Ronnie Bremer	Manor Motorsport	25	+4.984	5
6	21	(France) Bruno Besson	Serge Saulnier	25	+6.264	8
7	14	(United Kingdom) Robbie Kerr	Alan Docking Racing	25	+7.766	11
8	23	(Italy) Vitantonio Liuzzi	Opel Team BSR	25	+8.650	10
9	19	(France) Bruce Jouanny	Promatecme F3	25	+13.445	20
10	1	(Australia) James Courtney	Carlin Motorsport	25	+21.130	12
11	28	(Portugal) César Campaniço	Prema Powerteam	25	+21.879	19
12	40	(Netherlands) Jeroen Bleekemolen	Team Avanti	25	+24.836	21
13	25	(Austria) Bernhard Auinger	Opel Team BSR	25	+25.613	24
14	20	(United Kingdom) Matthew Gilmore	Promatecme F3	25	+26.050	25
15	47	(Japan) Katsuyuki Hiranaka	Swiss Racing Team	25	+28.730	26
16	36	(Brazil) João Paulo de Oliveira	Team Kolles Racing	25	+30.747	23
17	51	(Switzerland) Marc Benz	Swiss Racing Team	25	+35.154	30
18	46	(Italy) Raffaele Giammaria	Team Ghinzani SAM Euroc	25	+38.923	29
19	17	(Serbia and Montenegro) Miloš Pavlović	Target Racing	25	+39.834	14
20	43	(United States) Richard Antinucci	Manor Motorsport	25	+41.952	34
21	35	(Netherlands) Ross Zwolsman	Team Kolles Racing	25	+49.602	36
22	22	(France) Simon Abadie	Serge Saulnier	25	+51.646	15
23	8	(France) Jérémie de Souza	Signature Elf	25	+58.452	31
24	18	(Italy) Cristiano Citron	Target Racing	25	+1:01.259	35
25	7	(Japan) Yuji Ide	Signature Elf	25	+1:06.461	32
26	48	(Japan) Tatsuya Kataoka	Swiss Racing Team	25	+1:14.934	33
27	38	(Netherlands) Jaap van Lagen	Van Amersfoort Racing	25	+1:16.933	37
28	26	(Japan) Kosuke Matsuura	Prema Powerteam	23	+2 Laps	9
29	5	(France) Mathieu Zangarelli	Signature Elf	21	Retired	28
30	6	(France) Renaud Derlot	Signature Elf	19	Retired	27
Ret	12	(Netherlands) Stefan de Groot	JB Motorsport	16	Retired	7
Ret	27	(Australia) Ryan Briscoe	Prema Powerteam	11	Retired	22
Ret	11	(United Kingdom) Rob Austin	JB Motorsport	9	Retired	16
Ret	24	(Germany) Frank Diefenbacher	Opel Team BSR	6	Retired	17
Ret	3	(Japan) Shinya Hosokawa	Carlin Motorsport	6	Retired	38
Ret	4	(South Africa) Alan van der Merwe	Carlin Motorsport	1	Retired	13
Ret	41	(United Kingdom) Mark Taylor	Manor Motorsport	0	Retired	18
Ret	37	(Netherlands) Robert Doornbos	Team Ghinzani SAM Euroc	0	Retired	6
DNQ	15	(United Kingdom) Mark Mayall	Alan Docking Racing			
DNQ	33	(Belgium) Philip Cloostermans	Azeta Racing			
DNQ	49	(France) Benjamin Poron	Griffith's			
DNQ	44	(Austria) Clemens Stadler	GM Motorsport			
DNQ	34	(Italy) Alessandro Vitacolonna	Azeta Racing			
DNQ	16	(United Kingdom) Tor Graves	Alan Docking Racing			
DNQ	50	(Malaysia) Rizal Ramli	Trella Motorsport			
Fastest lap: Bruce Jouanny, 1:34.533, 164.019 km/h (101.917 mph) on lap 6
