= 2006 Eurocup Mégane Trophy =

Seasons
- ← 2005 2007 →

The 2006 Eurocup Mégane Trophy season was the second season of the Renault–supported touring car category, a one-make racing series that is part of the World Series by Renault.. The season began at Circuit Zolder on 29 April and finished at the Circuit de Catalunya on 29 October, after seven rounds and fourteen races. Jaap van Lagen won the title, having battled Matthieu Lahaye for the entire campaign.

== Teams and drivers ==
Team	No.	Drivers	Class	Rounds
(France) TDS	2	(France) Ludovic Badey		1–3
(France) TDS	21	(France) Mathieu Cheruy	J	7
(France) TDS	41	(France) Franck Mailleux	J	5
(France) TDS	44	(France) Jean-Philippe Madonia		6
(France) TDS	46	(France) Christophe Lefranc		6
Racing for Belgium	4	(Portugal) César Campaniço		All
Racing for Belgium	10	(Portugal) Miguel Freitas	J	All
Racing for Belgium	15	(Belgium) Wim Coelkelbergs		1, 3
Racing for Belgium	36	(Czech Republic) Jan Charouz	J	2
Racing for Belgium	39	(Netherlands) Olivier Tielemans		4
Racing for Belgium	42	(Netherlands) Ron Marchal		5-7
(France) Team Lompech Sport	5	(France) Frédéric Gabillon		1, 4, 6–7
(France) Team Lompech Sport	9	(France) Sébastien Dhouailly	J	1
(France) Team Lompech Sport	33	(France) Jean-Charles Miginiac		2–7
(Belgium) Thierry Boutsen Racing	6	(Belgium) Renaud Kuppens		All
(Belgium) Thierry Boutsen Racing	9	(France) Sébastien Dhouailly	J	2–7
(Belgium) Thierry Boutsen Racing	34	(Belgium) Kurt Mollekens		1
(Switzerland) Iris Racing	7	(Portugal) Pedro Petiz	J	All
(Netherlands) Equipe Verschuur	8	(Netherlands) Jeroen Reintjens		1–4
(Netherlands) Equipe Verschuur	14	(Netherlands) Jaap van Lagen		All
(Netherlands) Equipe Verschuur	26	(Netherlands) Bernhard ten Brinke		1–6
(Germany) Sesterheim Racing	11	(Austria) Andreas Mayerl		All
(Switzerland) Hirschi Racing Team	12	(Switzerland) Pierre Hirschi		1–4
(Switzerland) Hirschi Racing Team	40	(Switzerland) Jonathan Hirschi	J	5, 7
(France) TP Compétition / Moteur Huger	17	(United Kingdom) Justin Keen		1
(France) TP Compétition / Moteur Huger	37	(Italy) Luca Filippi	J	2
(France) TP Compétition / Moteur Huger	38	(Turkey) Mert Tahinci		2
(France) TP Compétition / Moteur Huger	38	(United Kingdom) Charles Hall		5
(France) TP Compétition / Moteur Huger	39	(Italy) Luca di Cienzo		3, 5
(France) TP Compétition / Moteur Huger	71	(Lebanon) Jean-Yves Mallat		6
(France) TP Compétition / Moteur Huger	72	(Italy) Giuseppe Chiminelli		1
(France) TP Compétition / Moteur Huger	72	(France) Renaud Derlot		6
(Spain) Blue Jumeirah Team	18	(Spain) Rafael Unzurrunzaga		1–2, 4–7
(Italy) Oregon Team	19	(Italy) Luigi Ferrara	J	All
(Italy) Oregon Team	20	(Italy) Massimiliano Fantini		1–6
(Italy) Oregon Team	20	(Italy) Alessandro Balzan		7
(France) Energy Racing	21	(France) Mathieu Cheruy	J	1–6
(France) Energy Racing	22	(France) Pascal Ballay		All
(Spain) Epsilon Euskadi	23	(United Kingdom) James Kirkpatrick	J	All
(Spain) Epsilon Euskadi	24	(France) Jean-Philippe Dayraut		All
(Spain) Saturn Motorsport	25	(Spain) Victor Fernandez		1–4, 7
(Spain) Saturn Motorsport	27	(Spain) Lluis Llobet		1–4, 7
(Switzerland) Race Performance	28	(Switzerland) Ralph Meichtry		All
(Germany) Roma Team Baumgärtner	29	(Germany) Steve Abold		1–6
(France) Tech 1 Racing	31	(Belgium) Bernard Delhez		1, 3
(France) Tech 1 Racing	32	(France) Matthieu Lahaye	J	All
(France) Tech 1 Racing	35	(France) Bruce Lorgeré-Roux	J	2, 4-7
(France) Delahaye	99	(France) Anthony Beltoise		6

Icon	Class
J	Junior Class

== Race calendar and results ==
Round		Circuit	Date	Pole position	Fastest lap	Winning driver	Winning team
1	R1	(Belgium) Circuit Zolder	29 April	(Netherlands) Jaap van Lagen	(Netherlands) Jaap van Lagen	(Netherlands) Jaap van Lagen	(Netherlands) Equipe Verschuur
1	R2	(Belgium) Circuit Zolder	30 April	(Netherlands) Jaap van Lagen	(Italy) Luigi Ferrara	(France) Jean-Philippe Dayraut	(Spain) Epsilon Euskadi
2	R1	(Turkey) Istanbul Park	17 June	(France) Ludovic Badey	(Netherlands) Jaap van Lagen	(France) Ludovic Badey	(France) TDS
2	R2	(Turkey) Istanbul Park	18 June	(Portugal) César Campaniço	(Portugal) César Campaniço	(Portugal) César Campaniço	Racing for Belgium
3	R1	(Italy) Misano World Circuit Marco Simoncelli	15 July	(Netherlands) Jaap van Lagen	(Netherlands) Jaap van Lagen	(France) Jean-Philippe Dayraut	(Spain) Epsilon Euskadi
3	R2	(Italy) Misano World Circuit Marco Simoncelli	16 July	(Netherlands) Jaap van Lagen	(Netherlands) Jaap van Lagen	(Netherlands) Jaap van Lagen	(Netherlands) Equipe Verschuur
4	R1	(Germany) Nürburgring	5 August	(France) Matthieu Lahaye	(Netherlands) Jaap van Lagen	(France) Matthieu Lahaye	(France) Tech 1 Racing
4	R2	(Germany) Nürburgring	6 August	(France) Matthieu Lahaye	(Netherlands) Jaap van Lagen	(Portugal) César Campaniço	Racing for Belgium
5	R1	(United Kingdom) Donington Park	9 September	(France) Matthieu Lahaye	(Netherlands) Jaap van Lagen	(France) Matthieu Lahaye	(France) Tech 1 Racing
5	R2	(United Kingdom) Donington Park	10 September	(France) Matthieu Lahaye	(France) Jean-Philippe Dayraut	(France) Matthieu Lahaye	(France) Tech 1 Racing
6	R1	(France) Bugatti Circuit, Le Mans	30 September	(France) Jean-Philippe Dayraut	(France) Matthieu Lahaye	(Portugal) Pedro Petiz	(Switzerland) Iris Racing
6	R2	(France) Bugatti Circuit, Le Mans	1 October	(France) Bruce Lorgeré-Roux	(France) Jean-Philippe Dayraut	(France) Jean-Philippe Dayraut	(Spain) Epsilon Euskadi
7	R1	(Spain) Circuit de Catalunya, Montmeló	24 October	(Netherlands) Jaap van Lagen	(Netherlands) Jaap van Lagen	(Netherlands) Jaap van Lagen	(Netherlands) Equipe Verschuur
7	R2	(Spain) Circuit de Catalunya, Montmeló	25 October	(Netherlands) Jaap van Lagen	(France) Matthieu Lahaye	(Netherlands) Jaap van Lagen	(Netherlands) Equipe Verschuur

== Standings ==
=== Drivers' Championship ===
Position	1st	2nd	3rd	4th	5th	6th	7th	8th	9th	10th	Pole	FL
Points	15	12	10	8	6	5	4	3	2	1	1	1

Pos	Driver	ZOL (Belgium)		IST (Turkey)		MIS (Italy)		NÜR (Germany)		DON (United Kingdom)		BUG (France)		CAT (Spain)		Points
1	(Netherlands) Jaap van Lagen	**1**	**8**	5	8	**4**	**1**	2	4	3	2	4	4	**1**	**1**	149
2	(France) Matthieu Lahaye	4	2	17	Ret	8	6	**1**	**3**	**1**	**1**	20	2	2	2	123
3	(Portugal) César Campaniço	Ret	5	2	**1**	Ret	2	4	1	6	9	9	5	3	3	107
4	(France) Jean-Philippe Dayraut	2	1	Ret	21	1	4	6	12	4	11	**2**	1	Ret	8	98
5	(France) Bruce Lorgeré-Roux			3	7			3	2	2	Ret	7	**3**	5	Ret	68
6	(France) Ludovic Badey	3	3	**1**	2	2	Ret									60
7	(Switzerland) Ralph Meichtry	Ret	15	6	5	13	3	15	6	12	4	3	9	8	6	56
8	(Portugal) Pedro Petiz	Ret	Ret	4	DSQ	EX	10	5	5	6	5	1	Ret	14	5	53
9	(Belgium) Renaud Kuppens	6	Ret	8	4	6	11	14	7	15	7	18	7	10	Ret	37
10	(Italy) Luigi Ferrara	5	12	11	Ret	3	DSQ	EX	Ret	10	17	6	11	9	10	30
11	(Netherlands) Bernhard ten Brinke	Ret	6	14	12	17	5	12	9	11	3	11	10			27
12	(United Kingdom) James Kirkpatrick	Ret	4	Ret	Ret	5	17	Ret	8	19	Ret	19	Ret	7	19	22
13	(France) Frédéric Gabillon	11	Ret					DSQ	15			12	8	4	4	20
14	(Netherlands) Jeroen Reintjens	Ret	Ret	7	6	Ret	Ret	7	10							14
15	(Portugal) Miguel Freitas	7	Ret	9	Ret	Ret	9	9	13	13	8	Ret	Ret	13	Ret	14
16	(France) Sébastien Dhouailly	8	Ret	18	10	18	Ret	13	14	9	Ret	10	Ret	Ret	9	12
17	(Austria) Andreas Mayerl	14	Ret	13	11	9	14	11	18	14	10	5	13	12	13	11
18	(Italy) Luca Filippi			15	3											10
19	(Germany) Steve Abold	10	11	16	14	Ret	Ret	10	16	8	12	Ret	Ret			6
20	(Italy) Luca di Cienzo					10	7			Ret	DNS					5
21	(France) Mathieu Cheruy	12	Ret	19	15	7	Ret	16	19	Ret	14	16	Ret	11	14	5
22	(Italy) Massimiliano Fantini	Ret	9	DNS	Ret	Ret	8	Ret	11	Ret	13	Ret	DNS			5
23	(United Kingdom) Justin Keen	11	7													4
24	(Netherlands) Olivier Tielemans							8	17							3
25	(Czech Republic) Jan Charouz			10	9											3
26	(Belgium) Kurt Mollekens	9	Ret													2
27	(Belgium) Wim Coelkelbergs	15	10			16	13									1
28	(Switzerland) Pierre Hirschi	16	14	12	13	11	Ret	17	Ret							0
29	(Belgium) Bernard Delhez	Ret	13			19	12									0
30	(France) Jean-Charles Miginiac			23	16	12	15	18	20	17	Ret	17	15	18	16	0
31	(France) Pascal Ballay	17	Ret	24	17	15	Ret	19	23	18	Ret	21	14	16	17	0
32	(Spain) Lluis Llobet	Ret	Ret	21	18	14	16	20	21					17	Ret	0
32	(Spain) Rafael Unzurrunzaga	19	17	DNQ	DNQ			22	Ret	Ret	16	22	18	21	20	0
33	(Spain) Victor Fernandez	18	16	22	19	20	Ret	21	22					20	18	0
34	(Turkey) Mert Tahinci			20	20											0
	(Italy) Giuseppe Chiminelli	Ret	Ret													0
guest drivers ineligible for points
	(France) Franck Mailleux									5	3					
	(France) Renaud Derlot											13	6			
	(Switzerland) Jonathan Hirschi									DSQ	EX			6	11	
	(Italy) Alessandro Balzan													19	7	
	(Lebanon) Jean-Yves Mallat											8	12			
	(Netherlands) Ron Marchal									16	15	14	17	15	12	
	(France) Jean-Philippe Madonia											15	16	Ret	15	
	(United Kingdom) Charles Hall									Ret	Ret					
	(France) Christophe Lefranc											Ret	DNS			
	(France) Anthony Beltoise											DSQ	Ret			
Pos	Driver	ZOL (Belgium)		IST (Turkey)		MIS (Italy)		NÜR (Germany)		DON (United Kingdom)		BUG (France)		CAT (Spain)		Points

Colour	Result
Gold	Winner
Silver	Second place
Bronze	Third place
Green	Points classification
Blue	Non-points classification
Blue	Non-classified finish (NC)
Purple	Retired, not classified (Ret)
Red	Did not qualify (DNQ)
Red	Did not pre-qualify (DNPQ)
Black	Disqualified (DSQ)
White	Did not start (DNS)
White	Withdrew (WD)
White	Race cancelled (C)
Blank	Did not practice (DNP)
Blank	Did not arrive (DNA)
Blank	Excluded (EX)

**Bold** – Pole
Italics – Fastest Lap
