= 2002 French Formula Three Championship =

2002 French Formula Three season

Seasons
- ← 2001 none →

The 2002 French Formula Three season was the 35th and the final French Formula Three Championship season. It began on 31 March at Nogaro and ended on 20 October at Magny-Cours after fourteen races.

Tristan Gommendy of ASM won races at Lédenon, Albi, Le Mans, Magny-Cours and had another five podiums and ultimately clinched the title. He finished 17 points clear of ARTA/Signature driver Renaud Derlot, who won Nogaro, Lédenon and Magny-Cours races. Third place went to Gommendy's teammate Olivier Pla, who finished on the first position at Croix-en-Ternois and Le Mans. Bruno Besson, Derek Hayes and Yuji Ide were another race winners.

== Teams and drivers ==
- All cars competed on Michelin tyres.

Entry List
Team	No	Driver	Chassis	Engine	Rounds
(France) Saulnier Racing	1	(France) Bruno Besson	Dallara F302	Renault	All
(France) Saulnier Racing	2	(France) Simon Abadie	Dallara F302	Renault	All
(France) ASM	3	(France) Tristan Gommendy	Dallara F302	Renault	All
(France) ASM	4	(France) Olivier Pla	Dallara F302	Renault	All
(France) Signature	5	(France) Julien Pressac	Dallara F302	Renault	All
(France) Signature	6	(France) Laurent Delahaye	Dallara F302	Renault	1–4
(France) Signature	15	(France) Nicolas Lapierre	Dallara F302	Renault	5, 7
(France) ARTA/Signature	7	(Japan) Yuji Ide	Dallara F302	Renault	All
(France) ARTA/Signature	8	(France) Renaud Derlot	Dallara F302	Renault	All
(France) LD Autosport	9	(France) Kevin Nadin	Dallara F302	Mugen Honda	All
(France) LD Autosport	10	(France) Jeremie de Souza	Dallara F302	Mugen Honda	1–3
(France) LD Autosport	11	(United Kingdom) Derek Hayes	Dallara F302	Mugen Honda	1–5
(France) LD Autosport	16	(France) Philippe Almèras	Dallara F302	Mugen Honda	6–7
(France) Griffith's	12	(France) Olivier Maximin	Dallara F302	Opel	1–4
(France) Griffith's	14	(France) Geoffrey Dellus	Dallara F302	Ford	3–7
(Italy) Prema Powerteam	40	(Portugal) César Campaniço	Dallara F302	Opel	7
(Italy) Prema Powerteam	41	(Australia) Ryan Briscoe	Dallara F302	Opel	7
(Germany) Bertram Schäfer Racing	42	(Italy) Vitantonio Liuzzi	Dallara F302	Opel	7
(Germany) Bertram Schäfer Racing	43	(Austria) Bernhard Auinger	Dallara F302	Opel	7
Class B
(Germany) Jenichen Motorsport	20	(Italy) Luca Iannacone	Dallara F399	Opel	All
(Germany) Jenichen Motorsport	45	(Italy) Diego Romanini	Dallara F399	Opel	7
(France) JMP Racing	21	(France) Jean Louis Bianchina	Dallara F399	Renault	1
(France) JMP Racing	24	(France) Stephane Mauget	Dallara F399	Renault	3, 6–7
(France) JMP Racing	30	(France) Anthony Janiec	Dallara F399	Renault	6–7
(France) Griffith's	23	(France) Benjamin Poron	Dallara F399	Opel	All
(France) Griffith's	25	(France) David Moretti	Dallara F399	Opel	4
(France) Optirace Sport	26	(France) Jimmy Tarres	Dallara F399	Renault	1
(France) Optirace Sport	27	(France) Nicolas Lapierre	Dallara F399	Renault	4
(France) Optirace Sport	28	(France) Pascal Hernandez	Dallara F399	Renault	5
(France) Optirace Sport	29	(France) Philippe Papin	Dallara F399	Renault	6
(France) Optirace Sport	31	(France) Olivier Clement	Dallara F399	Renault	7
(France) Optirace Sport	81	(France) Didier Sirgue	Dallara F399	Renault	1, 5, 7
(France) JH Racing	35	(France) Jacques Hulbert	Martini MK79	Opel	1, 4, 6–7

== Race calendar and results ==
- All races were held in France.

Round		Circuit	Date	Pole position	Fastest lap	Winning driver	Winning team	Class B winner
1	R1	Circuit Paul Armagnac, Nogaro	31 March	(France) Tristan Gommendy	(France) Renaud Derlot	(France) Renaud Derlot	(France) ARTA/Signature	(France) Benjamin Poron
1	R2	Circuit Paul Armagnac, Nogaro	1 April	(France) Renaud Derlot	(France) Renaud Derlot	(France) Renaud Derlot	(France) ARTA/Signature	(France) Benjamin Poron
2	R1	Circuit de Lédenon	28 April	(France) Tristan Gommendy	(France) Tristan Gommendy	(France) Tristan Gommendy	(France) ASM	(France) Benjamin Poron
2	R2	Circuit de Lédenon	28 April	(France) Tristan Gommendy	(France) Renaud Derlot	(France) Renaud Derlot	(France) ARTA/Signature	(France) Benjamin Poron
3	R1	Dijon-Prenois	30 June	(France) Tristan Gommendy	(France) Tristan Gommendy	(France) Bruno Besson	(France) Saulnier Racing	(France) Benjamin Poron
3	R2	Dijon-Prenois	30 June	(France) Tristan Gommendy	(France) Tristan Gommendy	(United Kingdom) Derek Hayes	(France) LD Autosport	(France) Benjamin Poron
4	R1	Circuit de Croix-en-Ternois	27 July	(France) Olivier Pla	(France) Olivier Pla	(France) Olivier Pla	(France) ASM	(France) Nicolas Lapierre
4	R2	Circuit de Croix-en-Ternois	28 July	(France) Tristan Gommendy	(France) Bruno Besson	(Japan) Yuji Ide	(France) ARTA/Signature	(France) Nicolas Lapierre
5	R1	Circuit d'Albi, Le Sequestre	8 September	(France) Tristan Gommendy	(France) Tristan Gommendy	(France) Tristan Gommendy	(France) ASM	(France) Benjamin Poron
5	R2	Circuit d'Albi, Le Sequestre	8 September	(France) Tristan Gommendy	(France) Tristan Gommendy	(France) Tristan Gommendy	(France) ASM	(France) Benjamin Poron
6	R1	Bugatti Circuit, Le Mans	6 October	(France) Olivier Pla	(France) Renaud Derlot	(France) Olivier Pla	(France) ASM	(France) Benjamin Poron
6	R2	Bugatti Circuit, Le Mans	6 October	(France) Tristan Gommendy	(France) Tristan Gommendy	(France) Tristan Gommendy	(France) ASM	(France) Benjamin Poron
7	R1	Circuit de Nevers Magny-Cours	20 October	(France) Tristan Gommendy	(France) Tristan Gommendy	(France) Tristan Gommendy	(France) ASM	(France) Benjamin Poron
7	R2	Circuit de Nevers Magny-Cours	20 October	(France) Olivier Pla	(France) Renaud Derlot	(France) Renaud Derlot	(France) ARTA/Signature	(France) Benjamin Poron

== Standings ==
- Points are awarded as follows:

1	2	3	4	5	6	7	8	9	10	PP	FL
20	15	12	10	8	6	4	3	2	1	1	1

Pos	Driver	NOG		LÉD		DIJ		CRT		ALB		LMS		MAG		Pts
1	(France) Tristan Gommendy	**2**	9	**1**	**Ret**	**3**	**7**	3	**5**	**1**	**1**	2	**1**	**1**	2	202
2	(France) Renaud Derlot	1	**1**	3	1	5	13	4	6	4	3	3	2	4	1	185
3	(France) Olivier Pla	6	Ret	10	2	4	3	**1**	2	13	2	**1**	3	2	**3**	159
4	(France) Simon Abadie	3	2	4	7	7	4	Ret	8	2	5	4	4	6	4	120
5	(France) Bruno Besson	5	3	2	5	1	2	9	11	5	4	5	Ret	8	11	119
6	(United Kingdom) Derek Hayes	4	5	6	4	2	1	6	7	3	10					94
7	(Japan) Yuji Ide	9	4	5	3	8	8	2	1	Ret	8	8	Ret	13	12	84
8	(France) Julien Pressac	7	8	7	Ret	6	9	10	9	7	7	7	5	5	8	62
9	(France) Kevin Nadin	13	16	Ret	6	10	15	11	10	6	6	6	Ret	10	14	33
10	(France) Laurent Delahaye	10	7	8	Ret	Ret	5	7	4							32
11	(France) Geoffrey Dellus					12	10	5	12	9	Ret	9	Ret	14	19	15
12	(France) Jeremie de Souza	8	6	Ret	Ret	11	6									15
13	(France) Nicolas Lapierre									8	9			9	10	15
14	(France) Olivier Maximin	11	10	Ret	8	9	11	12	Ret							6
	(France) Philippe Almèras											Ret	Ret	Ret	NC	0
guest drivers ineligible for championship points
	(Portugal) César Campaniço													3	7	0
	(Australia) Ryan Briscoe													7	5	0
	(Italy) Vitantonio Liuzzi													12	6	0
	(Austria) Bernhard Auinger													11	9	0
Class B
1	(France) Benjamin Poron	12	11	9	9	13	12	15	13	10	11	10	6	15	13	265
2	(Italy) Luca Iannacone	16	Ret	11	10	14	14	Ret	16	14	14	13	9	Ret	22	122
3	(France) Didier Sirgue	15	14							12	13			17	17	73
4	(France) Jacques Hulbert	17	15					14	15			12	8	Ret	21	63
5	(France) Stephane Mauget					Ret	DNS					11	7	Ret	16	45
6	(France) Nicolas Lapierre							8	3							40
7	(France) Pascal Hernandez									11	12					30
8	(France) Jimmy Tarres	14	12													30
9	(France) David Moretti							13	14							27
10	(France) Olivier Clement													18	18	22
11	(France) Jean Louis Bianchina	18	13													18
12	(France) Philippe Papin											14	10			18
13	(France) Anthony Janiec											15	Ret	Ret	20	14
guest drivers ineligible for championship points
	(Italy) Diego Romanini													16	15	0
Pos	Driver	NOG		LÉD		DIJ		CRO		ALB		LMS		MAG		Pts

Colour	Result
Gold	Winner
Silver	Second place
Bronze	Third place
Green	Points classification
Blue	Non-points classification
Blue	Non-classified finish (NC)
Purple	Retired, not classified (Ret)
Red	Did not qualify (DNQ)
Red	Did not pre-qualify (DNPQ)
Black	Disqualified (DSQ)
White	Did not start (DNS)
White	Withdrew (WD)
White	Race cancelled (C)
Blank	Did not practice (DNP)
Blank	Did not arrive (DNA)
Blank	Excluded (EX)

**Bold** – Pole
Italics – Fastest Lap
