= 2001 French Formula Three Championship =

Seasons
- ← 2000 2002 →

The 2001 French Formula Three Championship was the 34th running of the French Formula Three Championship. It began on 31 March at Nogaro and ended on 20 October at Magny-Cours after eleven races.

Ryo Fukuda of Saulnier Racing won races at Nogaro, Lédenon, Spa, Le Mans, and Val de Vienne Magny-Cours, and had another two podiums on his way to the championship title. He had only one rival who can contest with him and shared leftover wins. It was Tiago Monteiro, who won Nogaro, Croix-en-Ternois, and Albi races.

== Teams and drivers ==
- All cars competed on Michelin tyres.

Entry List
Team	No	Driver	Chassis	Engine	Rounds
(France) Signature	1	(France) Renaud Derlot	Dallara F399	Renault	All
(France) Signature	2	(France) Bruno Besson	Dallara F399	Renault	All
(France) Signature	64	(France) Lucas Lasserre	Dallara F399	Renault	All
(France) ARTA/Signature	3	(Japan) Keiko Ihara	Dallara F399	Renault	All
(France) ARTA/Signature	4	(France) Mathieu Zangarelli	Dallara F399	Renault	All
(France) ASM	5	(Portugal) Tiago Monteiro	Dallara F399	Renault	All
(France) ASM	6	(France) Tristan Gommendy	Dallara F399	Renault	All
(France) Saulnier Racing	7	(Japan) Ryo Fukuda	Dallara F399	Renault	All
(France) Saulnier Racing	8	(France) Olivier Pla	Dallara F399	Renault	All
(France) LD Autosport	9	(France) Kevin Nadin	Dallara F399	Renault	1–8, 10–11
(France) LD Autosport	10	(France) Jeremie de Souza	Dallara F399	Renault	All
(France) Epsilon by Graff	12	(France) Simon Abadie	Martini MK79	Opel	All
(France) Epsilon by Graff	72	(France) Jerome Dalla Lana	Martini MK79	Opel	All
(France) Griffith's	17	(Switzerland) Gilles Tinguely	Dallara F399	Opel	1–9
(France) Griffith's	18	(France) David Moretti	Dallara F399	Opel	1–2, 5–8
(France) Griffith's	19	(France) Robin Longechal	Dallara F399	Opel	9–11
(Italy) Prema Powerteam	41	(Australia) Ryan Briscoe	Dallara F399	Opel	11
(Italy) Prema Powerteam	42	(Sweden) Thed Björk	Dallara F399	Opel	11
(Switzerland) Menu Motorsport	42	(United Kingdom) Rob Austin	Dallara F399	Opel	11
Class B
(France) Pélikan Sport	20	(France) Philippe Hottinguer	Dallara F397	Fiat	1–2, 4–11
(France) Griffith's	21	(France) Roger Maurice Lemartin	Martini MK73	Opel	1–9
(France) Griffith's	37	(France) Olivier Maximin	Martini MK73	Opel	5–11
(France) Phénix Compéticion	22	(France) Patrick d'Aubreby	Martini MK73	Opel	1–2, 4, 6–7 9–11
(France) PLS Compéticion	23	(France) Philippe Le Sommer	Dallara F395	Renault	1–2, 4, 11
(France) PLS Compéticion	24	(France) Sébastien Carcone	Dallara F395	Renault	1–3, 6–7
(France) Optirace Sport	25	(France) Sylvie Valentin	Dallara F395	Fiat	1–3, 5–11
(France) Optirace Sport	26	(France) Didier Sirgue	Dallara F395	Fiat	6–7, 9
(France) JMP Racing	27	(France) Mohamed Ballahcene	Dallara F399	Fiat	1–2
(France) JMP Racing	29	(France) Julien Neel	Dallara F395	Fiat	1–2
(France) JMP Racing	30	(France) Jean Louis Bianchina	Dallara F395	Fiat	1–2, 4–5, 9–11
(France) JMP Racing	32	(France) Anthony Darvey	Dallara F395	Fiat	4
(France) JMP Racing	34	(France) Didier Carrere-Gee	Dallara F395	Fiat	4
(France) JMP Racing	36	(France) George van Elslande	Dallara F395	Fiat	5, 9–10
(France) Roger Péracchia	31	(France) Sylvian Jot	Dallara F397	Opel	1–4, 6–7
(France) JH Racing	35	(France) Jacques Hulbert	Dallara F395	Opel	1–2, 4, 6–8, 10–11
(France) Stardrive Motorsport	25	(Algeria) Nassim Sidi Said	Dallara F395	Opel	8–11
(France) Stardrive Motorsport	26	(United Kingdom) Adam Jones	Dallara F395	Opel	10–11

== Race calendar and results ==
Round	Circuit	Date	Pole position	Fastest lap	Winning driver	Winning team	Class B winner
1	(France) Circuit Paul Armagnac, Nogaro	15 April	(Portugal) Tiago Monteiro	(Portugal) Tiago Monteiro	(Portugal) Tiago Monteiro	(France) ASM	(France) Sylvie Valentin
2	(France) Circuit Paul Armagnac, Nogaro	16 April	(France) Tristan Gommendy	(Japan) Ryo Fukuda	(Japan) Ryo Fukuda	(France) Saulnier Racing	(France) Roger Maurice Lemartin
3	(France) Circuit de Lédenon	6 May	(Japan) Ryo Fukuda	(France) Bruno Besson	(Japan) Ryo Fukuda	(France) Saulnier Racing	(France) Sylvie Valentin
4	(France) Circuit de Nevers Magny-Cours	20 May	(Japan) Ryo Fukuda	(Japan) Ryo Fukuda	(Japan) Ryo Fukuda	(France) Saulnier Racing	(France) Jean Louis Bianchina
5	(France) Circuit du Val de Vienne	24 June	(Portugal) Tiago Monteiro	(Portugal) Tiago Monteiro	(Portugal) Tiago Monteiro	(France) ASM	(France) Olivier Maximin
6	(Belgium) Circuit de Spa-Francorchamps	8 July	(France) Mathieu Zangarelli	(France) Mathieu Zangarelli	(Japan) Ryo Fukuda	(France) Saulnier Racing	(France) Roger Maurice Lemartin
7	(Belgium) Circuit de Spa-Francorchamps	8 July	(Japan) Ryo Fukuda	(Japan) Ryo Fukuda	(Japan) Ryo Fukuda	(France) Saulnier Racing	(France) Olivier Maximin
8	(France) Circuit de Croix-en-Ternois	22 July	(Portugal) Tiago Monteiro	(Portugal) Tiago Monteiro	(Portugal) Tiago Monteiro	(France) ASM	(France) Olivier Maximin
9	(France) Circuit d'Albi, Le Sequestre	2 September	(Portugal) Tiago Monteiro	(Portugal) Tiago Monteiro	(Portugal) Tiago Monteiro	(France) ASM	(Algeria) Nassim Sidi Said
10	(France) Bugatti Circuit, Le Mans	30 September	(Japan) Ryo Fukuda	(Japan) Ryo Fukuda	(Japan) Ryo Fukuda	(France) Saulnier Racing	(France) Olivier Maximin
11	(France) Circuit de Nevers Magny-Cours	14 October	(Portugal) Tiago Monteiro	(Japan) Ryo Fukuda	(Japan) Ryo Fukuda	(France) Saulnier Racing	(United Kingdom) Adam Jones

== Standings ==
- Points are awarded as follows:

1	2	3	4	5	6	7	8	9	10	FL
20	16	14	12	10	9	8	7	6	5	1

Pos	Driver	NOG (France)		LÉD (France)	MAG (France)	VDV (France)	SPA (Belgium)		CRT (France)	ALB (France)	LMS (France)	MAG (France)	Pts
1	(Japan) Ryo Fukuda	9	1	**1**	**1**	3	1	**1**	4	3	**1**	1	191
2	(Portugal) Tiago Monteiro	**1**	7	3	2	**1**	3	4	**1**	**1**	6	**4**	171
3	(France) Bruno Besson	2	4	2	6	2	4	3	3	5	2	5	148
4	(France) Renaud Derlot	3	2	Ret	3	5	2	2	2	Ret	8	7	118
5	(France) Mathieu Zangarelli	5	3	4	5	9	**10**	7	10	4	9	6	99
6	(France) Tristan Gommendy	4	**Ret**	6	Ret	4	5	6	11	2	5	3	94
7	(France) Lucas Lasserre	8	5	8	4	10	9	8	5	Ret	4	22	76
8	(France) Olivier Pla	11	9	10	7	6	8	Ret	7	6	3	8	74
9	(France) Jeremie de Souza	10	18	9	8	7	7	5	8	Ret	DNS	10	58
10	(France) Simon Abadie	7	6	7	9	8	11	23	6	7	Ret	25	55
11	(France) Jerome Dalla Lana	6	Ret	5	10	11	6	22	18	Ret	7	7	41
12	(France) Kevin Nadin	Ret	8	11	11	19	Ret	9	9		Ret	13	25
13	(Japan) Keiko Ihara	12	14	Ret	Ret	12	Ret	10	12	8	10	14	22
14	(Switzerland) Gilles Tinguely	13	Ret	Ret	Ret	13	13	12	15	9			6
15	(France) David Moretti	14	10			Ret	12	11	13				5
16	(France) Robin Longechal									10	19	24	5
guest drivers ineligible for championship points
	(Australia) Ryan Briscoe											2	0
	(United Kingdom) Rob Austin											9	0
	(Sweden) Thed Björk											12	0
Class B
1	(France) Philippe Hottinguer	13	16		13	16	16	14	16	14	14	18	145
2	(France) Olivier Maximin					14	15	13	14	Ret	11	16	115
3	(France) Patrick d'Aubreby	18	12		14		Ret	15		12	13	19	96
4	(France) Sylvie Valentin	15	Ret	12		17	18	21	Ret	13	16	Ret	92
5	(France) Roger Maurice Lemartin	Ret	11	Ret	Ret	15	14	20	Ret	Ret			63
6	(France) Jacques Hulbert	21	17		Ret		21	18	17		17	23	62
7	(France) Jean Louis Bianchina	19	DNS		12	Ret				17	15	20	57
8	(Algeria) Nassim Sidi Said								Ret	11	12	15	52
9	(France) Sébastien Carcone	17	15	Ret			17	16					50
10	(France) Sylvian Jot	20	Ret	Ret	16		20	19					35
11	(United Kingdom) Adam Jones										18	11	29
12	(France) Didier Sirgue						19	17		15			18
13	(France) Philippe Le Sommer	Ret	Ret		15							21	28
14	(France) George van Elslande					18				16	20		25
15	(France) Julien Neel	22	16										17
16	(France) Anthony Darvey				17								9
	(France) Didier Carrere-Gee				Ret								0
	(France) Mohamed Ballahcene	DNS	DNS										0
Pos	Driver	NOG (France)		LÉD (France)	MAG (France)	VDV (France)	SPA (Belgium)		CRO (France)	ALB (France)	LMS (France)	MAG (France)	Pts

Colour	Result
Gold	Winner
Silver	Second place
Bronze	Third place
Green	Points classification
Blue	Non-points classification
Blue	Non-classified finish (NC)
Purple	Retired, not classified (Ret)
Red	Did not qualify (DNQ)
Red	Did not pre-qualify (DNPQ)
Black	Disqualified (DSQ)
White	Did not start (DNS)
White	Withdrew (WD)
White	Race cancelled (C)
Blank	Did not practice (DNP)
Blank	Did not arrive (DNA)
Blank	Excluded (EX)

**Bold** – Pole
Italics – Fastest Lap
