= Renaud Derlot =

French racing driver (born 1979)

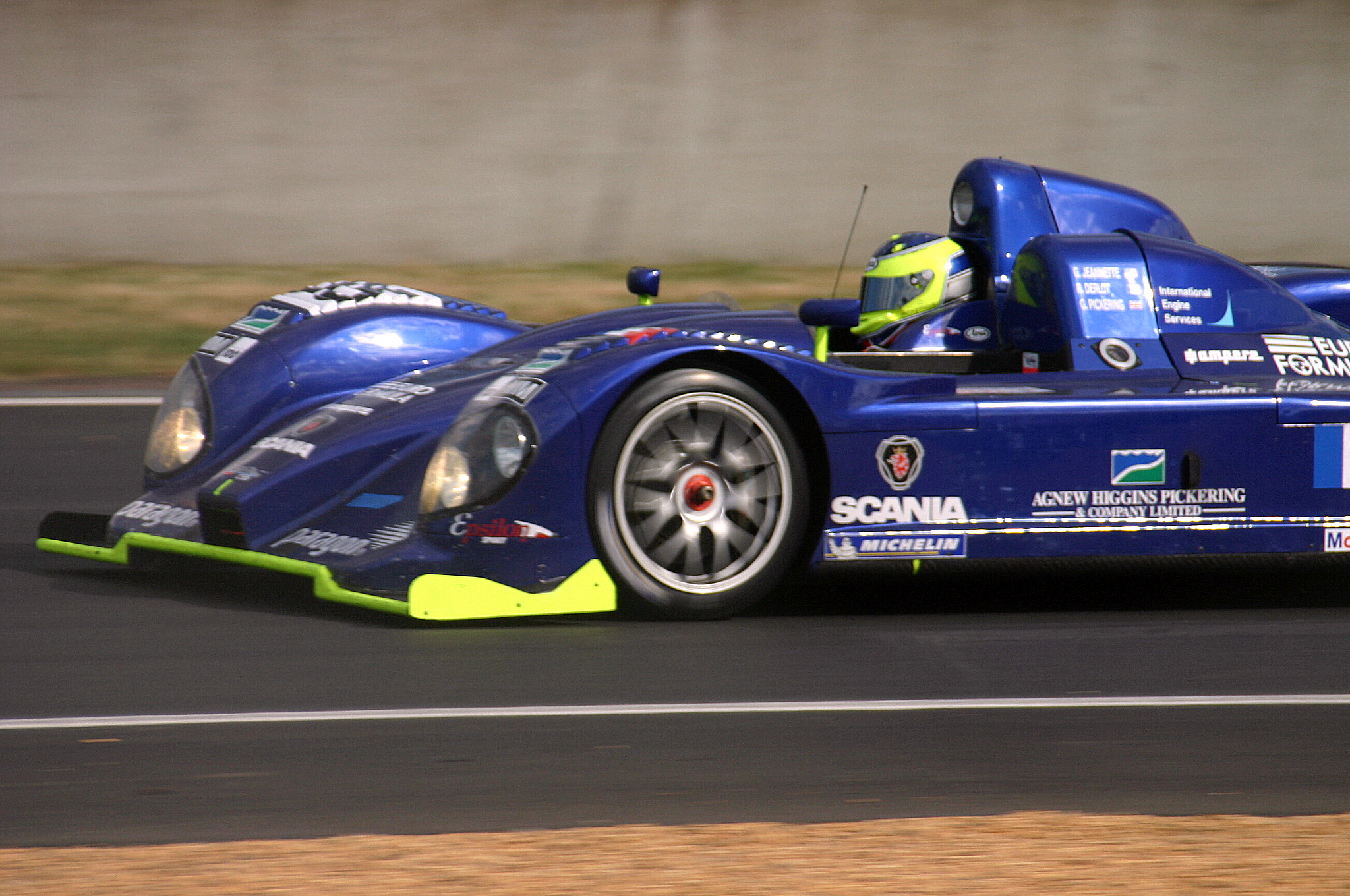
- Derlot in 2004
- Nationality: (France) French
- Born: 4 March 1979 (age 47) Aubervilliers, France

Championship titles
- 2009 2000 1999: Porsche Carrera Cup France; Formula Renault 2.0 France; Formula Ford France

Renaud Derlot (born 4 March 1979) is a French racing driver and manager. He won the 2002 Pau Grand Prix.

== Career ==
Derlot made his single-seater debut in 1997 in Formula Renault Campus, before spending two years in Formula Ford France, which were headlined by a title-winning campaign in 1999 with 16 wins to his name. Another title-winning season in Formula Renault 2.0 France for Graff Racing then followed in 2000.

In 2001, Derlot stepped up to the French Formula Three Championship with Signature, under the management of Benetton and Renault team principal Flavio Briatore. In his rookie season, Derlot scored six podiums and a best result of second four times as he finished fourth in the overall standings. Continuing in the series for 2002 with Autobacs and Scania sponsorship, Derlot swept the season opener at Nogaro, before taking further wins at Lédenon and Magny-Cours to secure runner-up honours behind Tristan Gommendy. Derlot also drove for ARTA/Signature in several one-off F3 races, and won the Pau Grand Prix, which at the time awarded the FIA European Formula 3 Cup title.

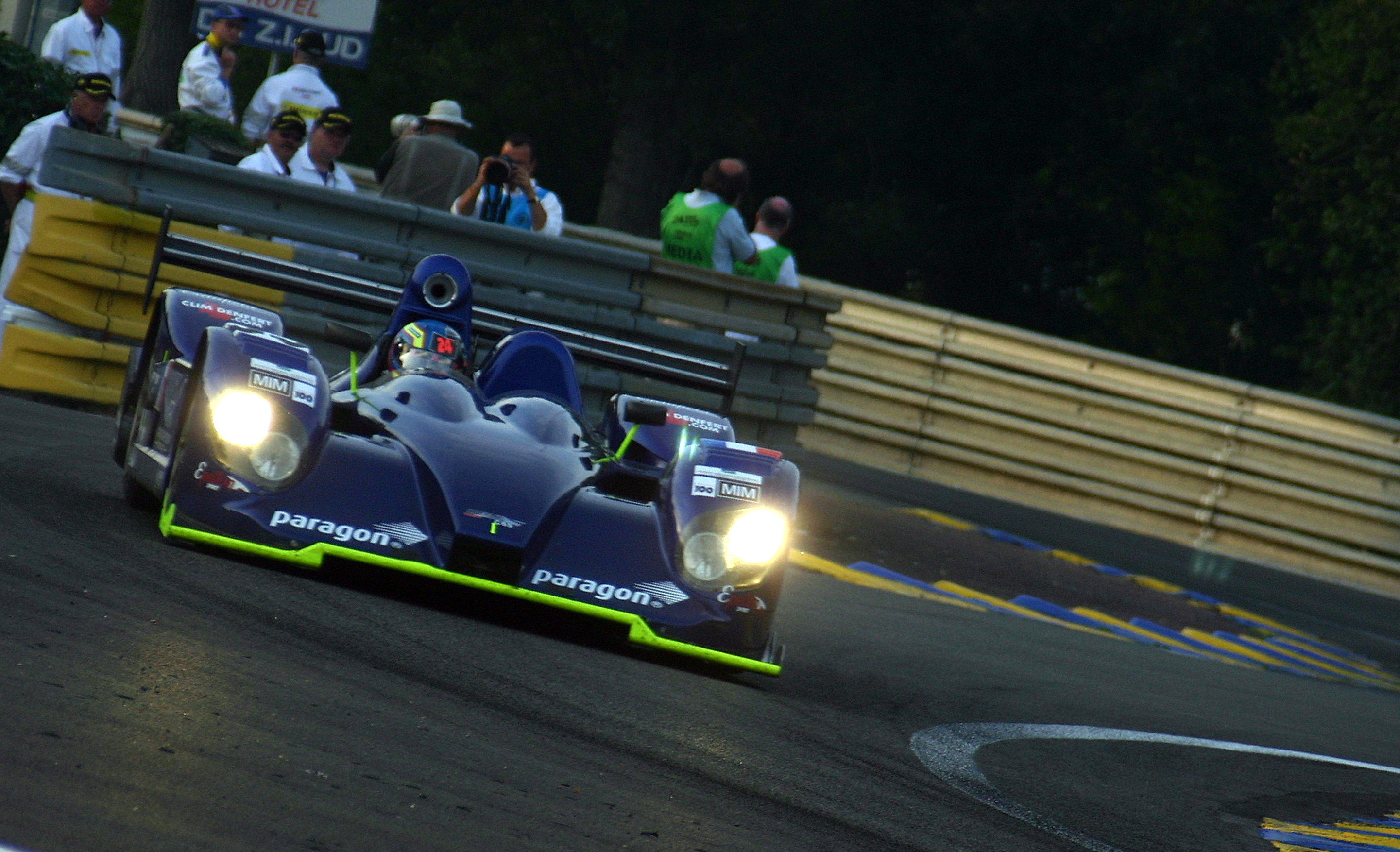
Derlot made his only 24 Hours of Le Mans start in 2004 for Epsilon Sport.

In 2003, Derlot moved to sportscar racing with outings in the French GT Championship for XL Racing and the 1000 km of Le Mans for Didier Bonnet Racing in LMP675, before making his debut at the 24 Hours of Le Mans in 2004, driving for Epsilon Sport in LMP2. Moving to Eurocup Mégane Trophy and TP Comptétition for 2005, Derlot took a win at Le Mans and nine other podiums to finish runner-up to Jan Heylen. Following a guest return to the series in 2006, Derlot moved to Porsche Carrera Cup France on a full-time basis in 2007 with IMSA Performance Matmut. He won at Nogaro and Val de Vienne and took six further podiums to secure fourth in points.

Ninth for IMSA Performance in 2008 then followed, before Derlot had his breakout year with Graff Racing in 2009, scoring four wins en route to the PCCF title. In 2010, Derlot graduated to the French GT Championship with Graff to share a Chevrolet Corvette C6 Z06 with Arnaud Peyroles. The pair won at Nogaro, Dijon and Val de Vienne to clinch runner-up honours on debut. Derlot partnered Gérard Tonelli in 2011, as Graff switched to the Mercedes-Benz SLS AMG GT3. They won the opening two races at Lédenon, before taking further victories at Dijon and Le Castellet to end the year fourth overall. Across the following three seasons, Derlot made sporadic returns to FFSA GT with Graff and Saintéloc Racing, before stepping back from driving at the end of 2014.

== Manager ==
In 2005, while still active in racing, Derlot got into driver management, starting with Nico Prost and Jean-Éric Vergne, whom he mentored through his Formula One stint with Toro Rosso. In 2016, Derlot became the sporting director of newly-created Panis Barthez Compétition in the European Le Mans Series, and later co-founded Vitesse Sports Management in 2020 with Julian Jakobi.

== Racing record ==
=== Racing career summary ===
Season	Series	Team	Races	Wins	Poles	F/Laps	Podiums	Points	Position
1997	Championnat de France de Formule Renault Elf Campus						1		
1998	Formula Ford France			1					
1999	Formula Ford France		21	16	18	15	19	364	**1st**
1999	Formula Ford Europe								
2000	Formula Renault 2.0 France	Graff Racing	8	4	4	3	7	100	**1st**
2000	Formula Renault 2000 Eurocup	Graff Racing						4	29th
2001	French Formula Three Championship	Signature	11	0	0	0	6	118	4th
2001	FIA European Formula 3 Cup	Signature	1	0	0	0	0	—N/a	DNF
2002	French Formula Three Championship	ARTA/Signature	14	4	1	5	8	185	**2nd**
2002	FIA European Formula 3 Cup	ARTA-Signature-Elf	1	1	0	0	1	—N/a	**1st**
2002	Masters of Formula 3	Signature Elf	1	0	0	0	0	—N/a	DNF
2002	Macau Grand Prix	Signature Team	1	0	0	0	0	—N/a	DNF
2002	Korea Super Prix	Signature Team	1	0	0	0	0	—N/a	23rd
2003	French GT Championship	XL Racing	2	0	0	0	0	16	38th
2003	1000 km of Le Mans – LMP675	Didier Bonnet Racing	1	0	0	0	0	—N/a	DNF
2004	French GT Championship	Trans Euro Route	0	0	0	0	0	0	NC
2004	24 Hours of Le Mans – LMP2	Epsilon Sport	1	0	0	0	0	—N/a	DNF
2005	Eurocup Mégane Trophy	TP Compétition / Huger	15	1	4	1	10	134	**2nd**
2006	Eurocup Mégane Trophy	TP Compétition / Moteur Huger	2	0	0	0	0	0	NC†
2007	Porsche Carrera Cup France	IMSA Performance Matmut	14	2	0	6	8	149	4th
2007	French GT Championship – GT3	IMSA Porsche Rouen	2	0	0	0	0	0	NC
2008	Porsche Carrera Cup France	IMSA Performance Matmut	14	1	0	1	2	61	9th
2009	Porsche Carrera Cup France	Graff Racing	14	4	4	4	7	173	**1st**
2009	Belgian Touring Car Series – S1		1	0	0	0	1	15	23rd
2009	Porsche Carrera Cup Germany		1	0	0	1	0	0	NC†
2010	French GT Championship	Graff Racing	10	3	3	0	7	158	**2nd**
2010	Porsche Carrera Cup France	Graff Racing	1	0	0	0	0	0	NC†
2010	Eurocup Mégane Trophy	Boutsen Energy Racing	6	0	0	0	5	0	NC†
2011	French GT Championship	Graff Racing	13	4	?	?	6	140.5	4th
2011	ADAC GT Masters	MS-Racing	2	0	0	0	0	0	NC
2012	French GT Championship	Graff Racing	4	0	0	1	0	12	25th
2014	FFSA GT Championship	Saintéloc Racing	2	0	0	0	0	0	NC†

^{†} As Derlot was a guest driver, he was ineligible to score points.

=== Complete French Formula Three Championship results ===
(key) (Races in bold indicate pole position) (Races in italics indicate fastest lap)

Year	Team	Chassis	Engine	Class	1	2	3	4	5	6	7	8	9	10	11	12	13	14	DC	Pts
2001	Signature	Dallara F399	Renault	A	NOG; 1; 3	NOG; 2; 2	LÉD; Ret	MAG1; 3	VDV; 5	SPA; 1; 2	SPA; 2; 2	CRT; 2	ALB; Ret	LMS; 8	MAG2; 7				4th	118
2002	ARTA/Signature	Dallara F302	Renault	A	NOG; 1; 1	**NOG**; **2**; 1	LÉD; 1; 3	LÉD; 2; 1	DIJ; 1; 5	DIJ; 2; 13	CRT; 1; 4	CRT; 2; 6	ALB; 1; 4	ALB; 2; 3	LMS; 1; 3	LMS; 2; 2	MAG; 1; 4	MAG; 2; 1	2nd	185

=== Complete 24 Hours of Le Mans results ===
Year	Team	Co-Drivers	Car	Class	Laps	Pos.	Class Pos.
2004	(France) Epsilon Sport	(United States) Gunnar Jeannette (United Kingdom) Gavin Pickering	Courage C65-JPX	LMP2	124	DNF	DNF

=== Complete Eurocup Mégane Trophy results ===
(key) (Races in bold indicate pole position) (Races in italics indicate fastest lap)

Year	Entrant	1	2	3	4	5	6	7	8	9	10	11	12	13	14	15	Rank	Points
2005	TP Compétition / Huger	**VAL**; **1**; 2	VAL; 2; 3	LMS; 1; 1	**LMS**; **2**; 2	BIL; 1; 8	BIL; 2 Ret	OSC; 1; 2	**OSC**; **2**; 2	DON; 1; 2	DON; 2 Ret	**EST**; **1**; 6	EST; 2; 3	EST; 3; 2	MNZ; 1; 7	MNZ; 2; 3	2nd	134
2006	TP Compétition / Moteur Huger	ZOL; 1	ZOL; 2	IST; 1	IST; 2	MIS; 1	MIS; 2	NÜR; 1	NÜR; 2	DON; 1	DON; 2	LMS; 1; 13	LMS; 2; 6	CAT; 1	CAT; 2		NC†	0†
2010	Boutsen Energy Racing	SPA; 1	SPA; 2	BRN; 1	BRN; 2	MAG; 1	MAG; 2	HUN; 1	HUN; 2	HOC; 1; 3	HOC; 2; 3	SIL; 1; 4	SIL; 2; 3	CAT; 1; 2	CAT; 2; 3		NC†	0†

=== Complete ADAC GT Masters results ===
(key) (Races in bold indicate pole position) (Races in italics indicate fastest lap)

Year	Team	Car	1	2	3	4	5	6	7	8	9	10	11	12	13	14	15	16	DC	Points
2011	MS-Racing	Mercedes-Benz SLS AMG GT3	OSC; 1	OSC; 2	SAC; 1	SAC; 2	ZOL; 1	ZOL; 2	NÜR; 1	NÜR; 2	RBR; 1	RBR; 2	LAU; 1	LAU; 2	ASS; 1	ASS; 2	HOC; 1; 14	HOC; 2; 22	NC	0
