= Ludovic Badey =

French racing driver (born 1980)

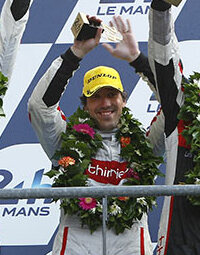
- Badey in 2014
- Nationality: (France) French
- Born: 23 April 1980 (age 46) Lyon, France
- Categorisation: FIA Silver

Ludovic Badey (born 23 April 1980) is a French businessman and racing driver who last competed in the GT2 European Series for Akkodis ASP Team.

== Business ventures ==
Badey joined his father Christian's HBI Group in 1999 as his first business partner, before being promoted to CEO in 2021, a role he still serves of as of July 2025.

== Racing career ==
Badey made his debut in single-seater racing in 2002, by racing in the Formula Renault 2.0 Cup France for Hexis Racing. After three seasons in the series, which also included select races in Formula Renault 2000 Eurocup in 2004, Badey joined Pouchelon Racing to race in the Eurocup Mégane Trophy the following year. In his first season in the series, Badey won race two at Donington Park and all three races at Estoril, as well as scoring four other podiums to end the year third in points.

Remaining with the newly-rebranded TDS Racing for the following year, Badey competed in the first three rounds, winning race one at Istanbul Park and taking four other podiums to take sixth in points. Returning to the series and TDS for 2007, he took a lone win at Magny-Cours en route to a 13th-place points finish. Badey then raced in Porsche Carrera Cup France for the following three years, taking a lone win at Nogaro in 2010 and finishing third in that year's standings with eight other podiums to his name for SOFREV ASP. During this, Badey made one-off appearances in the Formula Le Mans Cup for Graff Racing in 2009 and the French GT Championship in 2010 for Phoenix Racing.

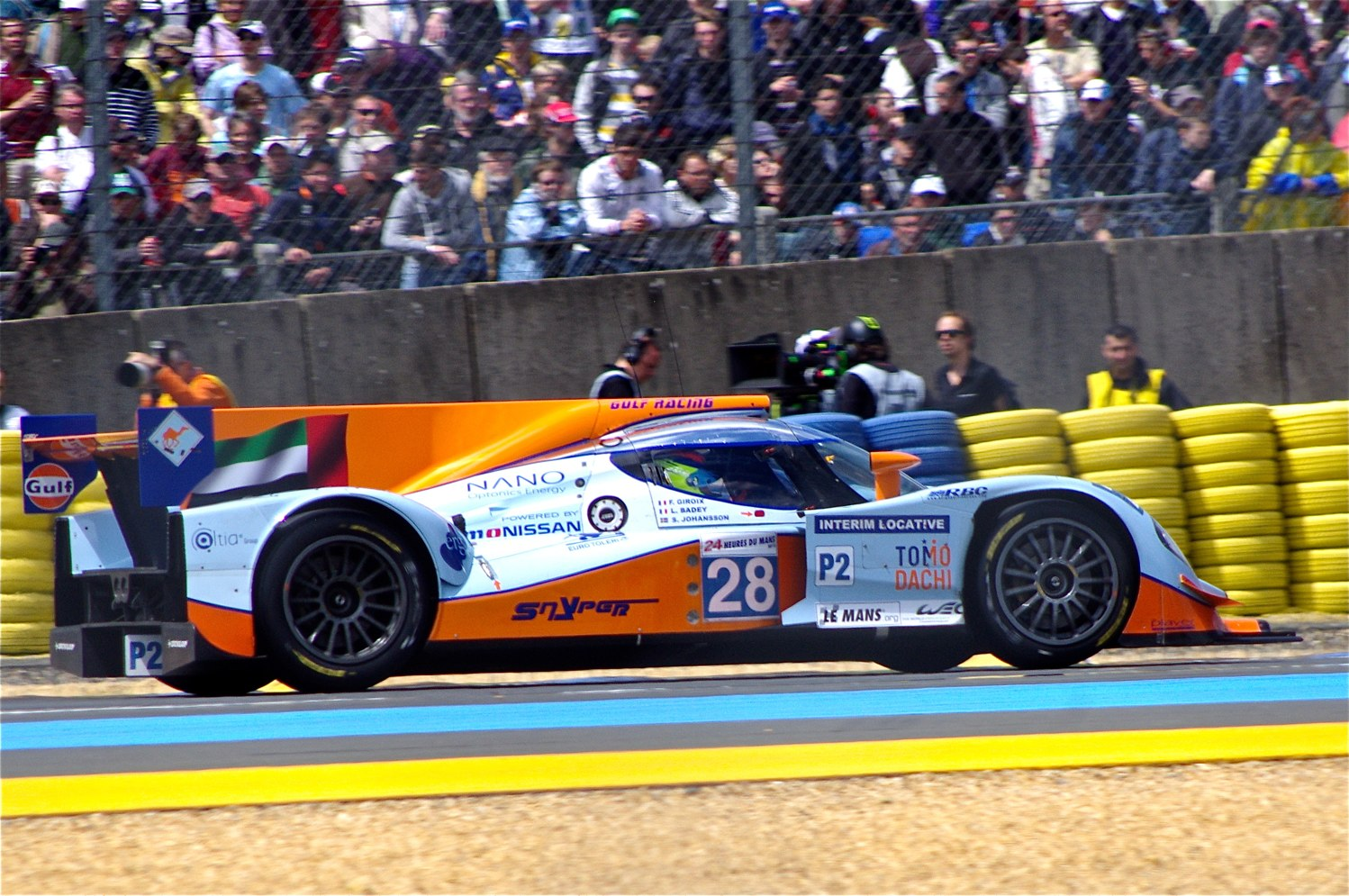
Badey made his 24 Hours of Le Mans debut in 2012 for Gulf Racing Middle East.

The following year, Badey remained with the Ferrari-affiliated ASP team for a dual campaign in both the French GT Championship and the Blancpain Endurance Series. In the former, Badey took a lone win at Albi and finished the year fifth in points, whereas in the latter, he took class wins at Navarra and the 24 Hours of Spa to end the season runner-up in GT3 Pro-Am. Continuing with the team for a similar campaign in 2012, Badey took a lone win at Val de Vienne in the former, and one Pro-Am class podium at Monza in the latter to end the year fourth in points. During 2012, Badey also made his 24 Hours of Le Mans debut for Gulf Racing Middle East in LMP2 alongside Fabien Giroix and Stefan Johansson.

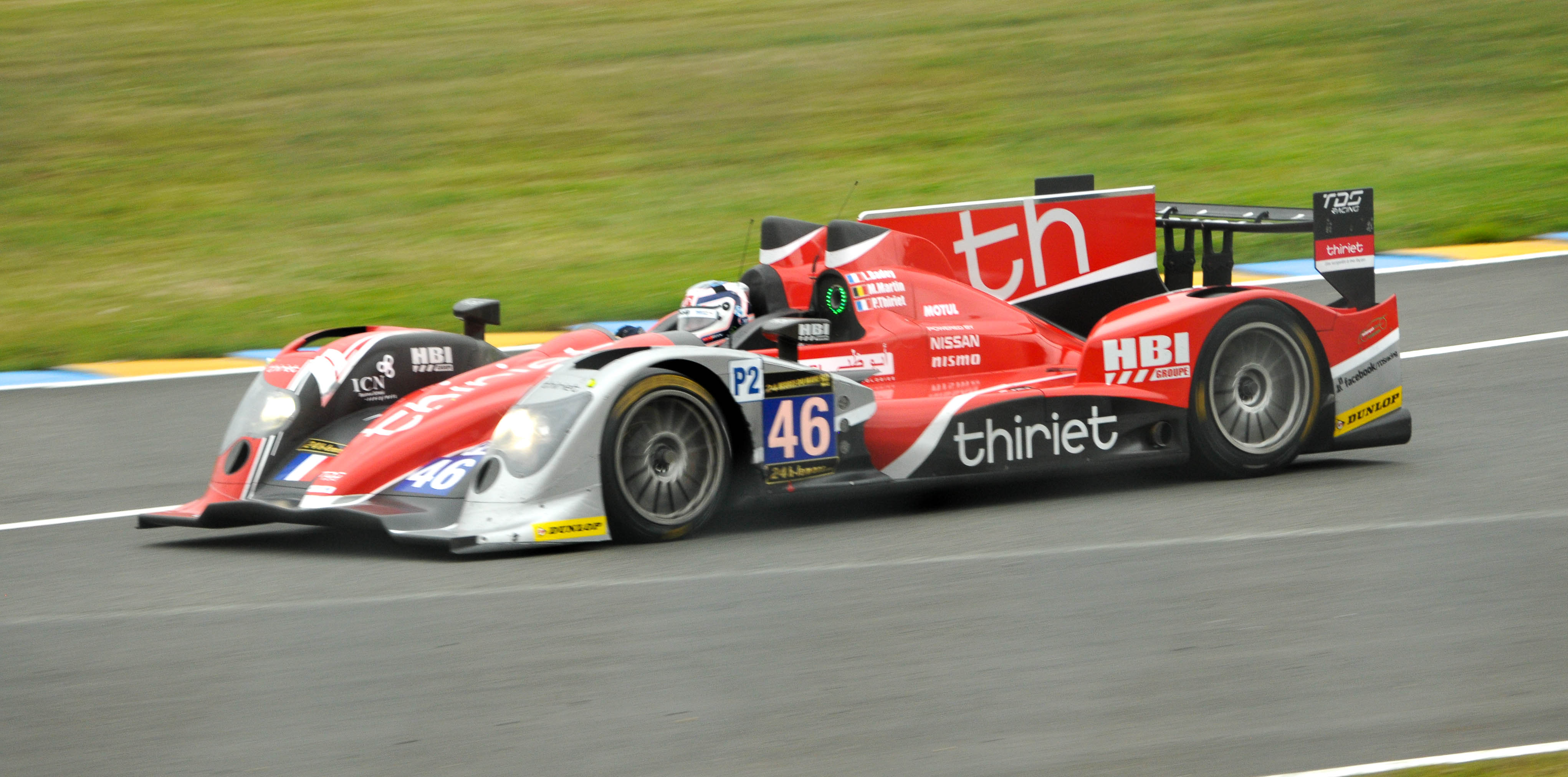
Badey began a short-lived but successful tenure at Thiriet by TDS Racing in 2013.

Switching to BMW-fielding TDS Racing for 2013, Badey returned to the Blancpain Endurance Series and the French GT Championship for the third season in a row. In the former, Badey finished seventh in Pro-Am with class podiums at Monza and Silverstone, whereas in the latter, he finished on the overall podium at Spa and Magny-Cours to finish 12th in points. During 2013, Badey also returned to the 24 Hours of Le Mans with the same team, in the LMP2 class alongside Pierre Thiriet and Maxime Martin.

Remaining with TDS for 2014, Badey raced with them in the LMP2 class of the European Le Mans Series and the 24 Hours of Le Mans. Starting the year with the Morgan LMP2, Badey won at Silverstone and finished fifth at Imola, but retired in the remaining three races after the team switched to a Ligier JS P2 as he dropped to eighth in points. Meanwhile at Le Mans, Badey took his only class podium at the event by finishing second with his Ligier JS P2. In parallel, Badey also returned to SOFREV ASP to race in the FFSA GT Championship, in which he scored a lone win at Magny-Cours to take ninth in the overall standings.

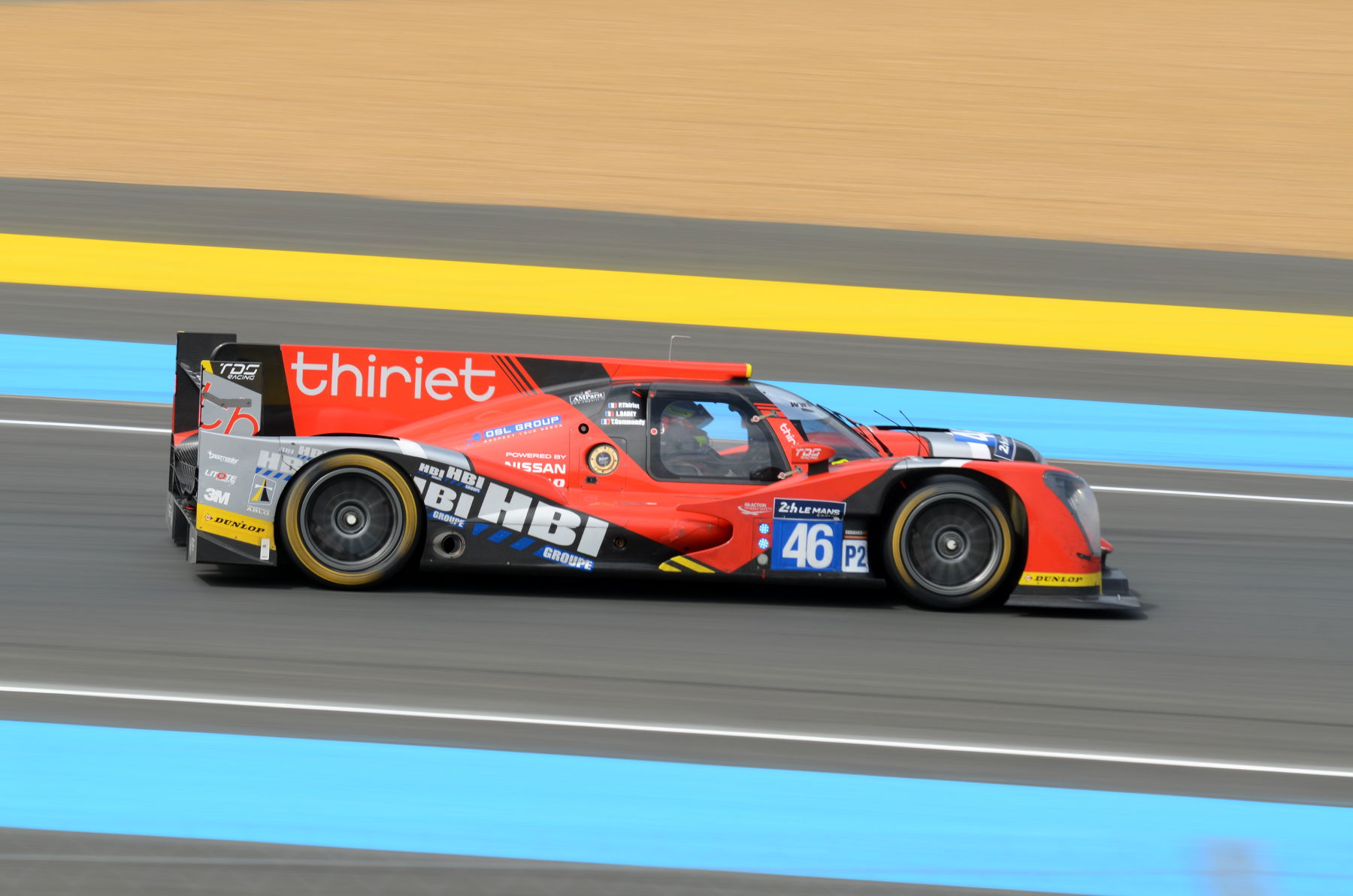
Badey was LMP2 runner-up in the 2015 European Le Mans Series.

Continuing with TDS, as they switched to an Oreca 05, to race in the European Le Mans Series for the following year, Badey took wins at Imola and Estoril and scored two other podiums to secure runner-up honors in the LMP2 standings. During 2015, Badey also raced with the team at the 24 Hours of Le Mans, as well as racing in the 24 Hours of Spa for AKKA ASP. After a year on the sidelines, Badey returned to AKKA ASP, now Mercedes-AMG–linked, to race in the Pro-Am class of the Blancpain GT Series Endurance Cup for 2017, taking a class podium at Barcelona and finishing 25th in points.

Four years later, Badey returned to Jérôme Policand's team to make a one-off appearance in the French GT4 Cup at Spa, finishing on the overall podium in both races and winning in the Pro-Am class in race two. In 2023, Badey competed in the last two rounds of the GT2 European Series for Akkodis ASP alongside Jean-Luc Beaubelique, winning race one at both Valencia and Le Castellet. The following year, Badey made a one-off return to the series at Misano alongside Mauro Ricci, retiring in both races.

== Karting record ==
=== Karting career summary ===
Season	Series	Team	Position
2021	Championnat de France Long Circuit — KZ2-M	Ludovic Badey	21st
2022	Championnat de France Long Circuit — KZ2-M		37th
2023	Championnat de France — KZ2-M	RK Competition	24th
2023	Championnat de France Long Circuit — KZ2-M	RK Competition	20th
2024	Karting European Championship — KZ2-M	Ludovic Badey	15th
2024	Champions of the Future Euro Series — KZ2-M	Ludovic Badey	10th
2024	Karting International Super Cup — KZ2-M	Ludovic Badey	19th
2024	Championnat de France Long Circuit — KZ2-M	Ludovic Badey	21st
2025	Karting European Championship — KZ2-M	Ludovic Badey	13th
2025	Championnat de France — KZ2 Gentleman	ASK Annemasse	3rd
2025	Championnat de France Long Circuit — KZ2 Gentleman	ASK Annemasse	13th

== Racing record ==
=== Racing career summary ===
Season	Series	Team	Races	Wins	Poles	F/Laps	Podiums	Points	Position
2002	Formule Renault 2.0 Cup France	Hexis Racing	1	0	0	0	0	0	NC
2003	Formule Renault 2.0 Cup France	Hexis Racing	10	0	0	0	0	24	16th
2003	Formula Renault 2000 Masters	Hexis Racing	0	0	0	0	0	0	NC
2004	Formula Renault 2000 Eurocup	Tech 1 Racing	7	0	0	0	0	0	40th
2004	Championnat de France Formula Renault 2.0	Tech 1 Racing	8	0	0	0	0	27	16th
2004	Championnat de France Formula Renault 2.0	Graff Racing	6	0	0	0	0	27	16th
2005	Eurocup Mégane Trophy	Pouchelon Racing	15	4	1	1	8	108	**3rd**
2006	Eurocup Mégane Trophy	TDS	6	1	1	0	5	60	6th
2007	Eurocup Mégane Trophy	TDS	14	1	0	0	1	35	13th
2008	Porsche Carrera Cup France	Graff Racing	12	0	0	1	0	71	8th
2008	Eurocup Mégane Trophy	TDS	2	0	0	0	0	5	15th
2009	Porsche Carrera Cup France	Graff Racing	14	0	0	0	2	90	7th
2009	Formula Le Mans Cup	Graff Racing	1	0	0	0	0	8	25th
2010	Porsche Carrera Cup France	SOFREV - ASP	13	1	2	1	9	152	**3rd**
2010	MitJet Series		6	0	0	0	1	86	16th
2010	French GT Championship	Phoenix Racing	1	0	0	0	0	0	NC
2011	French GT Championship	Team SOFREV ASP	14	1	0	0	2	103	5th
2011	Blancpain Endurance Series – GT3 Pro-Am	Team SOFREV ASP	5	2	0	0	3	95	**2nd**
2012	Blancpain Endurance Series – Pro-Am	SOFREV Auto Sport Promotion	6	0	0	0	1	64	4th
2012	French GT Championship	SOFREV Auto Sport Promotion	13	1	0	0	2	86	11th
2012	FIA World Endurance Championship – LMP2	Gulf Racing Middle East	1	0	0	0	0	0	NC
2012	24 Hours of Le Mans – LMP2	Gulf Racing Middle East	1	0	0	0	0	—N/a	DNF
2013	Blancpain Endurance Series – Pro-Am	TDS Racing	5	0	0	0	2	42	7th
2013	French GT Championship	TDS Racing	11	0	0	0	2	63	12th
2013	24 Hours of Le Mans – LMP2	Thiriet by TDS Racing	1	0	0	0	0	—N/a	DNF
2014	European Le Mans Series – LMP2	Thiriet by TDS Racing	5	1	0	0	1	35	8th
2014	24 Hours of Le Mans – LMP2	Thiriet by TDS Racing	1	0	0	0	1	—N/a	**2nd**
2014	FFSA GT Championship	Team SOFREV ASP	14	1	0	0	2	103	9th
2014	Blancpain Endurance Series – Pro-Am	Team SOFREV ASP	1	0	0	0	0	2	26th
2015	European Le Mans Series – LMP2	Thiriet by TDS Racing	5	2	0	0	4	91	**2nd**
2015	24 Hours of Le Mans – LMP2	Thiriet by TDS Racing	1	0	0	0	0	—N/a	DNF
2015	Blancpain Endurance Series – Pro-Am	AKKA ASP	1	0	0	0	0	0	NC
2017	Blancpain GT Series Endurance Cup – Pro-Am	AKKA ASP	5	0	0	0	1	17	25th
2017	Intercontinental GT Challenge	AKKA ASP	1	0	0	0	0	0	NC
2021	French GT4 Cup – Pro-Am	AKKA ASP	2	1	0	0	2	43	13th
2023	GT2 European Series – Pro-Am	Akkodis ASP Team	4	2	0	0	4	83	10th
2024	GT2 European Series – Pro-Am	Akkodis ASP Team	2	0	0	0	0	0	NC

^{†} As Badey was a guest driver, he was ineligible for championship points.

=== Complete Eurocup Mégane Trophy results ===
(key) (Races in bold indicate pole position) (Races in italics indicate fastest lap)

Year	Entrant	1	2	3	4	5	6	7	8	9	10	11	12	13	14	15	Rank	Points
2005	Pouchelon Racing	VAL; 1; 3	VAL; 2 Ret	LMS; 1; 3	LMS; 2 Ret	BIL; 1; 3	BIL; 2; 5	OSC; 1; 11	OSC; 2; 11	DON; 1; 3	DON; 2; 1	EST; 1; 1	**EST**; **2**; 1	EST; 3; 1	MNZ; 1; 20	MNZ; 2 Ret	3rd	108
2006	TDS	ZOL; 1; 3	ZOL; 2; 3	**IST**; **1**; 1	IST; 2; 2	MIS; 1; 2	MIS; 2 Ret	NÜR; 1	NÜR; 2	DON; 1	DON; 2	LMS; 1	LMS; 2	CAT; 1	CAT; 2		6th	60
2007	TDS	ZOL; 1; 6	ZOL; 2; 8	NÜR; 1; 11	NÜR; 2; 11	HUN; 1; 5	HUN; 2 Ret	DON; 1; 9	DON; 2 Ret	MAG; 1; 1	MAG; 2 Ret	EST; 1; 12	EST; 2; 15	CAT; 1 Ret	CAT; 2 Ret		13th	35
2008	TDS Racing	SPA; 1	SPA; 2	SIL; 1	SIL; 2	HUN; 1	HUN; 2	NÜR; 1 Ret	NÜR; 2; 6	LMS; 1	LMS; 2	EST; 1	EST; 2	CAT; 1	CAT; 2		15th	5

=== Complete GT World Challenge Europe results ===
==== GT World Challenge Europe Endurance Cup ====
Year	Team	Car	Class	1	2	3	4	5	6	7	8	Pos	Points
2011	SOFREV ASP	Ferrari 458 Italia GT3	GT3 Pro-Am	MNZ; Ret	NAV; 5	SPA; 6H ??	SPA; 12H ??	SPA; 24H; 6	MAG; 7	SIL; 11		2nd	95
2012	SOFREV Auto Sport Promotion	Ferrari 458 Italia GT3	Pro-Am	MNZ; 8	SIL; 8	LEC; Ret	SPA; 6H ?	SPA; 12H ?	SPA; 24H; 10	NÜR; 12	NAV; 15	4th	64
2013	TDS Racing	BMW Z4 GT3	Pro-Am	MNZ; 7	SIL; 14	LEC; 31	SPA; 6H ?	SPA; 12H ?	SPA; 24H; Ret	NÜR; Ret		7th	42
2014	SOFREV Auto Sport Promotion	Ferrari 458 Italia GT3	Pro-Am	MNZ	SIL	LEC	SPA; 6H; 17	SPA; 12H; 37	SPA; 24H; 22	NÜR		35th	2
2015	AKKA ASP	Ferrari 458 Italia GT3	Pro-Am	MNZ	SIL; 35	LEC	SPA; 6H	SPA; 12H	SPA; 24H	NÜR		NC	0
2017	AKKA ASP	Mercedes-AMG GT3	Pro-Am	MNZ; Ret	SIL; 32	LEC; Ret	SPA; 6H; 56	SPA; 12H; 50	SPA; 24H; Ret	CAT; 21		25th	17

=== Complete FIA World Endurance Championship results ===
(key) (Races in bold indicate pole position; races in italics indicate fastest lap)

Year	Entrant	Class	Car	Engine	1	2	3	4	5	6	7	8	Pos.	Pts
2012	Gulf Racing Middle East	LMP2	Lola B12/80	Nissan VK45DE 4.5 V8	SEB	SPA	LMS; Ret	SIL	SÃO	BHR	FUJ	SHA	NC	0

=== Complete 24 Hours of Le Mans results ===
Year	Team	Co-Drivers	Car	Class	Laps	Pos.	Class Pos.
2012	(United Arab Emirates) Gulf Racing Middle East	(France) Fabien Giroix (Sweden) Stefan Johansson	Lola B12/80-Nissan	LMP2	92	DNF	DNF
2013	(France) Thiriet by TDS Racing	(France) Pierre Thiriet (Belgium) Maxime Martin	Oreca 03-Nissan	LMP2	310	DNF	DNF
2014	(France) Thiriet by TDS Racing	(France) Pierre Thiriet (France) Tristan Gommendy	Ligier JS P2-Nissan	LMP2	355	6th	**2nd**
2015	(France) Thiriet by TDS Racing	(France) Pierre Thiriet (France) Tristan Gommendy	Oreca 05-Nissan	LMP2	204	DNF	DNF

=== Complete European Le Mans Series results ===
(key) (Races in bold indicate pole position) (Races in italics indicate fastest lap)

Year	Entrant	Class	Chassis	Engine	1	2	3	4	5	Rank	Points
2014	Thiriet by TDS Racing	LMP2	Morgan LMP2	Nissan VK45DE 4.5 L V8	SIL; 1	IMO; 5				8th	35
2014	Thiriet by TDS Racing	LMP2	Ligier JS P2	Nissan VK45DE 4.5 L V8			RBR; Ret	LEC; Ret	EST; Ret	8th	35
2015	Thiriet by TDS Racing	LMP2	Oreca 05	Nissan VK45DE 4.5 L V8	SIL; 3	IMO; 1	RBR; 2	LEC; 6	EST; 1	2nd	91

=== Complete GT2 European Series results ===
(key) (Races in bold indicate pole position) (Races in italics indicate fastest lap)

Year	Team	Car	Class	1	2	3	4	5	6	7	8	9	10	11	12	Pos	Points
2023	Akkodis ASP Team	Mercedes-AMG GT2	Pro-Am	MNZ; 1	MNZ; 2	RBR; 1	RBR; 2	DIJ; 1	DIJ; 2	POR; 1	POR; 2	VAL; 1; 1	VAL; 2; 2	LEC; 1; 1	LEC; 2; 3	10th	83
2024	Akkodis ASP Team	Mercedes-AMG GT2	Pro-Am	LEC; 1	LEC; 2	MIS; 1 Ret	MIS; 2 Ret	SPA; 1	SPA; 2	HOC; 1	HOC; 2	MNZ; 1	MNZ; 2	BAR; 1	BAR; 2	NC	0
