= Iris Racing =

(Switzerland) Iris Racing
- Founded: 2000
- Team principal(s): (Switzerland) Igor Capik
- Former series: International Formula Master; Formule Renault 2.0 Suisse; Eurocup Mégane Trophy
- Teams' Championships: 2004 Renault Speed Trophy F2000 season

Iris Racing is an auto racing team based in Switzerland. It is known under the name Iris Project in the International Formula Master series.
