= César Campaniço =

Portuguese racing driver

- Nationality: Portuguese
- Born: 31 March 1980 (age 46) Lisbon, Portugal

International GT Open - GTS career
- Debut season: 2010
- Current team: Team Novadriver
- Categorisation: FIA Gold (until 2011); FIA Silver (2012–)
- Car number: 59
- Starts: 28
- Wins: 4
- Poles: 3
- Fastest laps: 1
- Best finish: 6th in 2014

Previous series
- 2013 2010, 2012 2009, 2012 2009 2007-08 2005-07 2005–06 2004 2003 2002 2001 2001 1999–2000: FIA GT Series; Portuguese GT Championship; FIA GT3 European Championship; ADAC GT Masters; PTCC; Eurocup Mégane Trophy; A1 Grand Prix; Formula Renault V6 Eurocup; Formula 3 Euro Series; German F3 Championship; Formula Renault 2.0 Italy; Eurocup Formula Renault 2.0; Formula BMW ADAC

Championship titles
- 2010, 2012 2010, 2011 2008 2007: Portuguese GT Championship; Spanish GT Championship; PTCC; PTCC (Class 2)

César Campaniço (born 31 March 1980) is a Portuguese racing driver.

Campaniço was born in Lisbon, and is best known for his appearances in the Portuguese Touring Car Championship.

Campaniço is currently a Racing Driver and Sports Manager, a Racing Driver Performance Coach, and a Performance Data Analyst in Motorsport Engineering.

== Racing record ==
=== Career summary ===
Season	Series	Team	Races	Wins	Poles	F/Laps	Podiums	Points	Position
1999	Formula BMW ADAC	Team Rosberg Junior	16	0	0	0	2	66	10th
2000	Formula BMW ADAC	Team Rosberg	19	0	0	0	8	134	4th
2001	Formula Renault 2.0 Italy	Prema Powerteam	9	1	3	1	6	172	2nd
2001	Formula Renault 2000 Eurocup	Prema Powerteam	8	0	1	2	4	122	3rd
2001	Korea Super Prix	Prema Powerteam	1	0	0	0	0	N/A	11th
2001	Spanish Formula Three Championship	Paco Orti Racing	3	0	0	0	0	18	21st
2002	German Formula Three	Prema Powerteam	18	0	0	0	0	9	14th
2002	French Formula Three	Prema Powerteam	2	0	0	0	0	N/A	NC†
2002	Italian Formula Three	Prema Powerteam	1	0	0	0	0	3	12th
2002	Korea Super Prix	Prema Powerteam	1	0	0	0	0	N/A	18th
2002	Macau Grand Prix	Prema Powerteam	1	0	0	0	0	N/A	10th
2002	Masters of Formula 3	Prema Powerteam	1	0	0	0	0	N/A	11th
2003	Formula 3 Euro Series	Swiss Racing Team	14	0	0	0	0	13	16th
2003	Formula 3 Euro Series	Signature Plus	2	0	0	0	0	0	16th
2003	Macau Grand Prix	Signature Plus	1	0	0	0	0	N/A	9th
2003	Korea Super Prix	Signature Plus	1	0	0	0	0	N/A	7th
2004	Formula Renault V6 Eurocup	Cram Competition	19	0	0	0	3	154	7th
2005–06	A1 Grand Prix	A1 Team Portugal	2	0	0	0	0	66	9th
2006	Eurocup Mégane Trophy	Racing for Belgium	14	1	1	1	5	91	4th
2007	Portuguese Touring Car Championship(Class 2)	Sports & You	14	3	?	?	7	84	1st
2007	European Touring Car Cup S2000	Sports & You	2	0	0	0	0	1	10th
2007	Eurocup Mégane Trophy	Equipe Verschuur	2	0	0	0	0	0	NC
2008	Portuguese Touring Car Championship		16	8	?	?	11	111	1st
2008	European Touring Car Cup S2000	Liqui Moly Team Engstler	2	0	0	0	0	6	4th
2008	ADAC Procar Series	Liqui Moly Team Engstler	2	0	0	0	1	9	17th
2008	Eurocup Mégane Trophy	Oregon Team	2	0	0	0	0	0	NC
2008	Windsor Arch Macau GT Cup Grand Prix	Mastercar SRL	1	0	0	0	0	N/A	4th
2009	ADAC GT Masters	Team Rosberg	12	1	1	1	3	47	9th
2009	FIA GT3 European Championship	Team Rosberg	9	0	0	0	4	43	3rd
2009	Portuguese Touring Car Championship		10	5	4	5	9	77	3rd
2009	Rolex Sports Car Series	Mastercar-Coast 2 Costa Racing	1	0	0	0	0	8	124th
2010	Portuguese GT Championship	Team Novadriver Total	10	8	?	?	8	98	1st
2010	Spanish GT Championship — GTS	Team Novadriver Total	9	5	2	1	7	74	1st
2010	World Touring Car Championship	Team Novadriver Total	2	0	0	0	0	0	NC
2010	International GT Open - GTS	Team Novadriver Total	2	1	0	0	1	0	NC
2011	Spanish GT Championship — GTS	Team Novadriver	12	6	6	2	11	100	1st
2011	International GT Open - GTS	Team Novadriver	2	0	0	0	0	0	NC
2012	Portuguese GT Championship	Team Novadriver	12	5	?	?	10	98	1st
2012	FIA GT3 European Championship	Team Novadriver	12	1	3	0	4	135	4th
2012	Copa de España de Super GT	Team Novadriver	10	2	3	0	7	62	3rd
2012	International GT Open - GTS	Team Novadriver	2	0	0	0	0	0	NC
2013	Portuguese GT Championship	Team Novadriver	4	4	?	?	4	77	1st
2013	Spanish GT Championship — GTS	Team Novadriver	6	1	2	2	3	59	2nd
2013	FIA GT Series	Team Novadriver	12	2	1	1	6	97	4th
2013	International GT Open - GTS	Team Novadriver	6	1	1	0	3	0	NC
2014	International GT Open - GTS	Team Novadriver	16	2	2	1	4	48	6th
2014	Portuguese Sport Prototypes Championship		2	0	0	0	1	24	9th
2015	International GT Open - Pro-Am	Team Novadriver	2	0	0	0	0	4	12th
2015	International GT Open - Pro-Am	Drivex School	2	0	0	0	0	4	12th
2016	International GT Open - Pro-Am	Drivex School	2	0	0	0	1	8	21st

† – As Campaniço was a guest driver, he was ineligible for points.

=== Complete Formula 3 Euro Series results ===
(key)

Year	Entrant	Chassis	Engine	1	2	3	4	5	6	7	8	9	10	11	12	13	14	15	16	17	18	19	20	DC	Points
2003	Swiss Racing Team	Dallara F302/011	Spiess-Opel	HOC; 1; 14	HOC; 2; 6	ADR; 1; 4	ADR; 2 Ret	PAU; 1 Ret	PAU; 2; 8	NOR; 1; 7	NOR; 2; 7	LMS; 1; 14	LMS; 2 Ret	NÜR; 1; 8	NÜR; 2; 18	A1R; 1; 26	A1R; 2; 16	ZAN; 1	ZAN; 2	HOC; 1	HOC; 2			16th	13
2003	Signature-Plus	Dallara F302/067	Renault																			MAG; 1; 21	MAG; 2; 18	16th	13

=== FIA GT Series results ===
Year	Class	Team	Car	1	2	3	4	5	6	7	8	9	10	11	12	Pos.	Points
2013	Pro-Am	Team Novadriver	Audi	NOG; QR; 5	NOG; CR; 5	ZOL; QR; 13	ZOL; CR; 9	ZAN; QR; 11	ZAN; QR; Ret	SVK; QR; 17	SVK; CR; Ret	NAV; QR; 6	NAV; CR; 9	TBA; QR; Ret	TBA; CR; 7	4th	97
