= Azerti Motorsport =

(Belgium) Azerti Motorsport
- Founded: 2002
- Team principal(s): Wim Coekelbergs
- Former series: Superleague Formula; Eurocup Mégane Trophy
- Teams' Championships: 2005 Eurocup Mégane Trophy
- Drivers' Championships: 2005 Eurocup Mégane Trophy (Heylen); 2010 Superleague Formula season (Rigon)

Azerti Motorsport (also known as Racing for Belgium) is a Belgian motorsport team founded by former racer Wim Coekelbergs.

== History ==
Racing for Belgium started racing in Belgian Clio Cup in 2003, but graduated to the Eurocup Mégane Trophy in 2005, taking the driver and teams titles with Jan Heylen. They also won the 2005 and 2006 SEAT Leon Supercopa in Spain with Oscar Nogues.

In 2007, the team entered an Alfa Romeo 156 in the World Touring Car Championship for Miguel Freitas and an Aston Martin DBRS9 in the Belcar series and FIA GT3 series for Wim Coekelbergs and Ron Marchal. For 2008, the team regrouped their activities and planned to move to the SEAT Eurocup, but retreated back to the Belgian Clio Cup.

Operating under the name Azerti Motorsport, the team moved to Superleague Formula in 2008, where they have operated several cars, including PSV Eindhoven, Al Ain, A.C. Milan and A.S. Roma. They have won several races in the series in 2008 (vice-champion with Yelmer Buurman) and 2009.

In 2010 the team ran 2 cars, the Corinthians car for Robert Doornbos and the RSC Anderlecht car for Davide Rigon. Rigon won the first Superleague Formula title for the Belgian squad. The last race weekends of the 2010 SF season Franck Perera joined the team with the Bordeaux car and showed as from the first run that he and the car were up to speed, taking P2 in qualifying and winning the prize-money race in Ordos (China).

In 2011 Azerti participated on the two final rounds of the Superleague Championship with Neel Jani in the RSC Anderlecht car, Yelmer Buurman in the Dutch (holland) car and Tristan Gommendy in the France car.

After 2 years of silence, 2014 marked the team's return, participating the Acceleration14 (FA1 ex A1GP cars) championship. With Nigel Melker as Azerti/Team Holland driver, the team took the championship ship crown home. In the seasons final Azerti scored an impressive double win in Assen. Leading both races from start to finish they clinched both driver and team title and are the first ever FA1 champions.
