= Marc Benz =

Swiss racing driver (born 1982)

- Nationality: (Switzerland) Swiss
- Born: 15 November 1982 (age 43) Altstätten (Switzerland)

Marc Benz (born 15 November 1982 in Altstätten) is a Swiss racing driver. He has competed in such series as Porsche Supercup, Formula Renault 2000 Eurocup and Formula Renault V6 Eurocup.
