= Eurocup Mégane Trophy =

Renault Sport auto racing series

- Category: One-make racing by Renault
- Country: Europe
- Inaugural season: 1976
- Folded: 2013
- Constructors: Renault
- Last Drivers' champion: (Italy) Mirko Bortolotti
- Last Teams' champion: (Italy) Oregon Team
- Official website: renault-sport.com

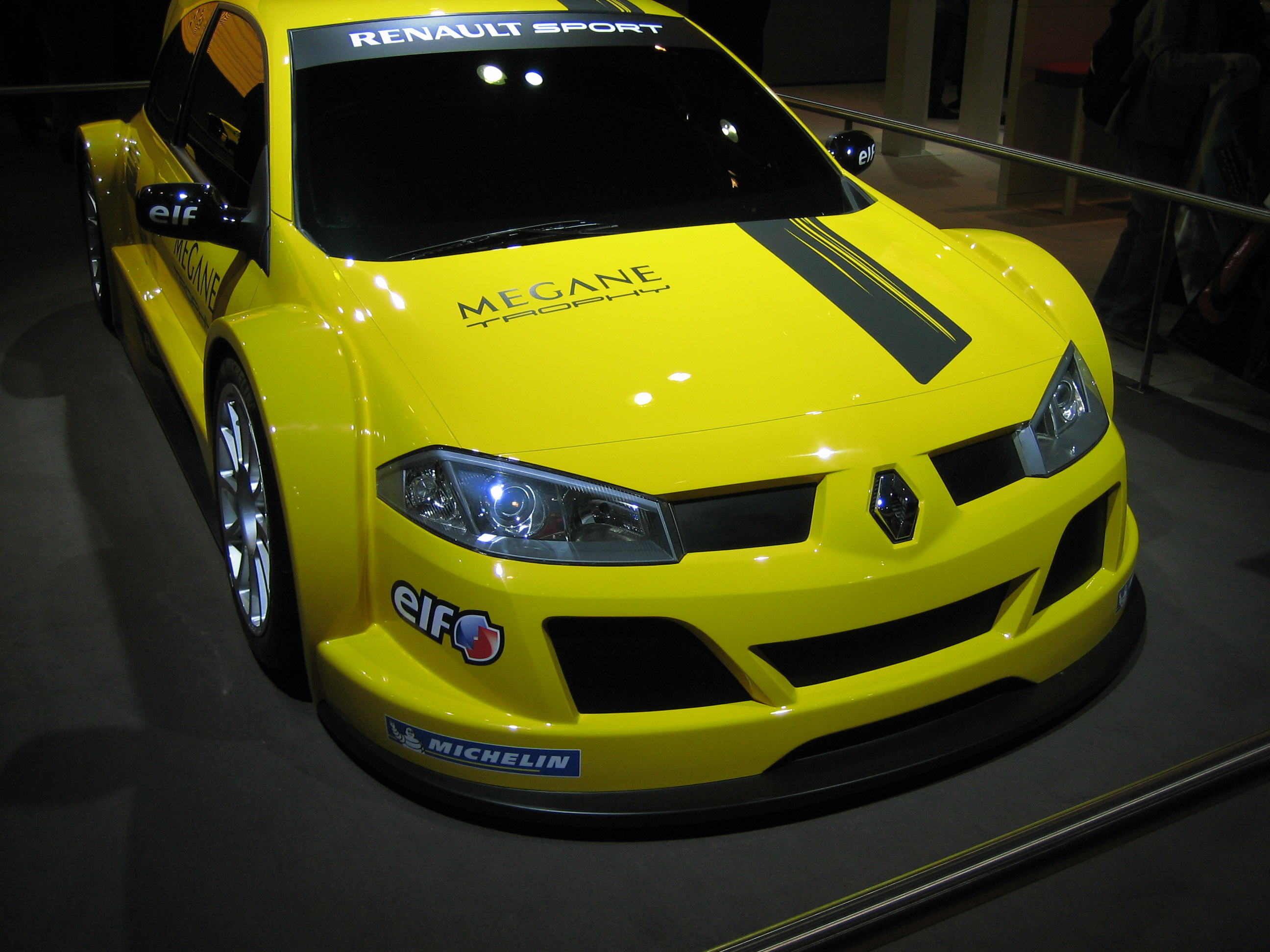
Renault Mégane Trophy (Brussel 2006)

The Renault Eurocup Mégane Trophy was a one-make racing series created and managed by Renault Sport. The series has raced with the Renault Mégane Renault Sport since 2005 as part of the World Series by Renault. The Renault Eurocup has run with various models under differing names since 1976.

== History ==
The Eurocup use a single Renault produced vehicle. The series use cars according to era and the championship name is so altered :

- Coupe d'Europe Renault 5 Alpine (1976–1980)
- Coupe d'Europe Renault 5 Turbo (1981–1984)
- Europa Cup Renault Alpine V6 Turbo (1985–1988)
- Europa Cup Renault 21 Turbo (1989–1991)
- Europa Cup Renault Clio (1992–1995)
- Renault Sport Spider Elf Trophy (1996–1998)
- Renault Sport Clio Trophy (1999–2004)
- Eurocup Mégane Trophy (2005–2008)
- Eurocup Mégane Trophy Mk. II (2009–2013)

== Scoring system ==
- Here is the current scoring system for races in the Eurocup Mégane Trophy:

Position	1st	2nd	3rd	4th	5th	6th	7th	8th	9th	10th
Points	15	12	10	8	6	5	4	3	2	1

- There was a point awarded for pole position up until prior to the start of the 2010 season.

== Champions ==
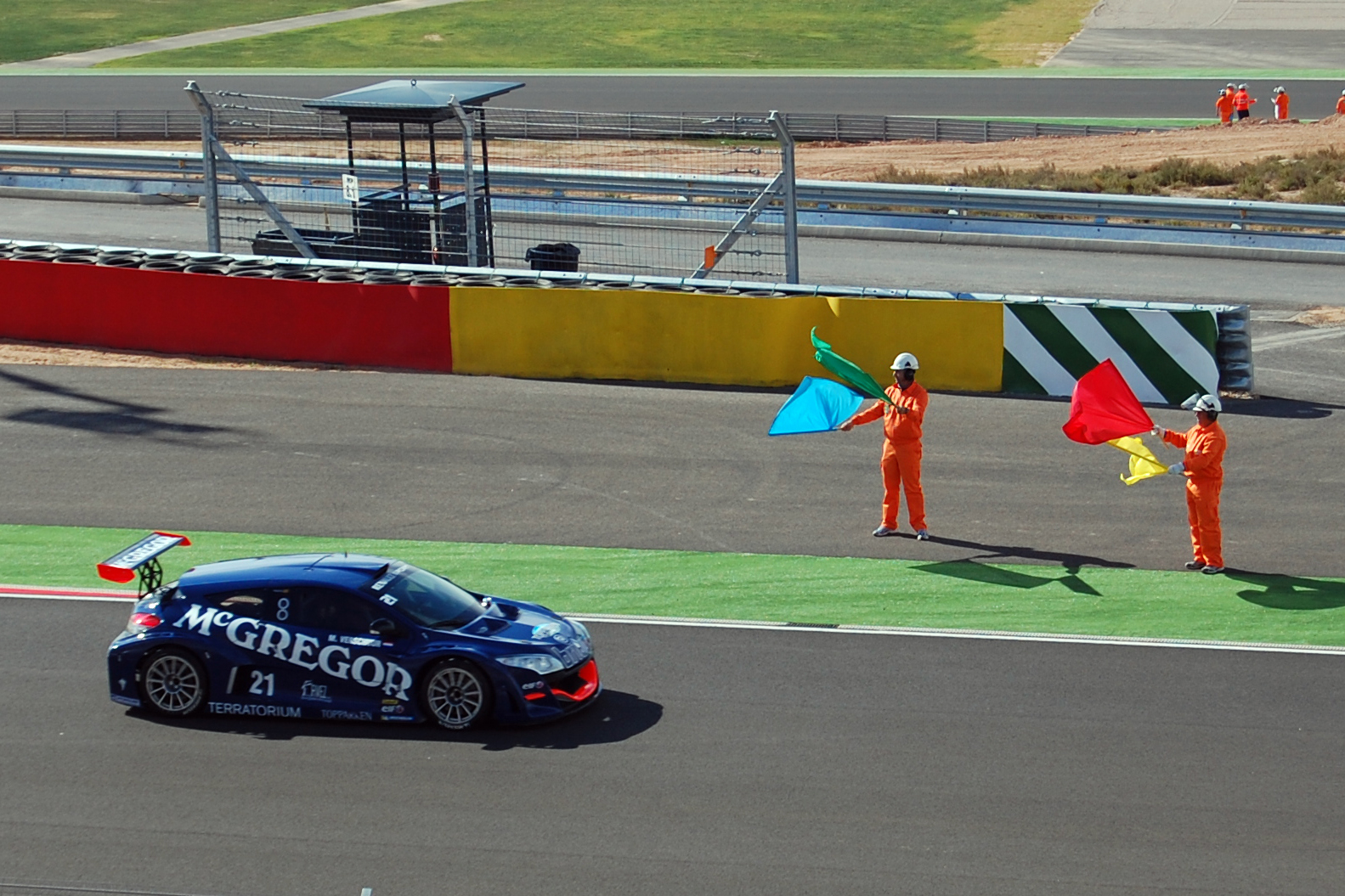
Mike Verschuur in Motorland Aragón after winning 2009 Renault Mégane Trophy championship

Season	Series Name	Champion	Team Champion	Secondary Class Champion
1976	Coupe d'Europe Renault 5 Alpine	(France) Yves Frémont		
1977	Coupe d'Europe Renault 5 Alpine	(Italy) Mauro Baldi		
1978	Coupe d'Europe Renault 5 Alpine	(Germany) Wolfgang Schütz		
1979- 1980	not held			
1981	Coupe d'Europe Renault 5 Turbo	(Germany) Wolfgang Schütz		
1982	Coupe d'Europe Renault 5 Turbo	(France) Joël Gouhier		
1983	Coupe d'Europe Renault 5 Turbo	(Netherlands) Jan Lammers	(Netherlands) Renault Nederland	
1984	Coupe d'Europe Renault 5 Turbo	(Netherlands) Jan Lammers	(Netherlands) Renault Nederland	
1985	Europa Cup Renault Alpine V6 Turbo	(Argentina) Oscar Larrauri		
1986	Europa Cup Renault Alpine V6 Turbo	(Italy) Massimo Sigala		
1987	Europa Cup Renault Alpine V6 Turbo	(Italy) Massimo Sigala		
1988	Europa Cup Renault Alpine V6 Turbo	(Italy) Massimo Sigala		
1989	Europa Cup Renault 21 Turbo	(Italy) Massimo Sigala		
1990	Europa Cup Renault 21 Turbo	(Italy) Massimo Sigala		
1991	not held			
1992	Europa Cup Renault Clio	(France) Bernard Castagne		
1993	Europa Cup Renault Clio	(Italy) Salvatore Pirro		
1994	Europa Cup Renault Clio	(France) Bernard Castagne		
1995	Europa Cup Renault Clio	(Switzerland) Marcel Kläy		
1996	Renault Sport Spider Elf Trophy	(France) Franck Lagorce		
1997	Renault Sport Spider Elf Trophy	(Norway) Tommy Rustad		
1998	Renault Sport Spider Elf Trophy	(Italy) Andrea Belicchi		
1999	Renault Sport Clio Trophy	(France) Jérôme Policand		
2000	Renault Sport Clio Trophy	(Italy) Luca Rangoni	(Italy) Autotottoli	
2001	Renault Sport Clio Trophy	(Italy) Luca Rangoni	(Italy) Autotottoli	
2002	Renault Sport Clio Trophy	(Italy) Luca Rangoni	(Italy) Autotottoli	
2003	Renault Sport Clio Trophy	(Italy) Luca Rangoni	(Italy) Autotottoli	
2004	not held			
2005	Eurocup Renault Mégane V6 Trophy	(Belgium) Jan Heylen	Racing for Belgium	(France) Sébastien Dhouailly (Junior)
2006	Eurocup Renault Mégane V6 Trophy	(Netherlands) Jaap van Lagen	(France) Tech 1 Racing	(France) Matthieu Lahaye (Junior)
2007	Eurocup Renault Mégane V6 Trophy	(Portugal) Pedro Petiz	(France) Tech 1 Racing	(Portugal) Pedro Petiz (Junior)
2008	Eurocup Renault Mégane V6 Trophy	(France) Michaël Rossi	(France) Tech 1 Racing	(France) Jean-Philippe Madonia (Gentleman)
2009	Eurocup Renault Mégane V6 Trophy	(Netherlands) Mike Verschuur	(France) TDS Racing	(France) Jean-Philippe Madonia (Gentleman)
2010	Eurocup Renault Mégane V6 Trophy	(Netherlands) Nick Catsburg	(France) TDS Racing	(France) Jean-Philippe Madonia (Gentleman)
2011	Eurocup Renault Mégane V6 Trophy	(Switzerland) Stefano Comini	(Italy) Oregon Team	(Belgium) David Dermont (Gentleman)
2012	Eurocup Renault Mégane V6 Trophy	(Spain) Albert Costa	(Italy) Oregon Team	(France) Jean-Charles Miginiac (Gentleman)
2013	Eurocup Renault Mégane V6 Trophy	(Italy) Mirko Bortolotti	(Italy) Oregon Team	(Netherlands) Jeroen Schothorst (Gentleman)

== See also ==
- Renault Clio Cup
- Dacia Logan Cup
- Sports Renault
