= Circuit de Croix-en-Ternois =

Race track in France

- Full Circuit (1973–2012)
- Location: Croix-en-Ternois, France
- Coordinates: 50°22′44.5″N 2°17′48.4″E
- Opened: May 1973; 52 years ago
- Major events: Former: Drift Masters (2019); European F3 (1975–1977, 1981, 1983); French F3 (1981–1992, 1994–1995, 1997, 2001–2002); French Formula Renault (1975, 1980, 1983–1992, 2002); French Supertouring Championship (1976, 1980–1995, 1997, 2001)
- Website: http://circuitdecroix.com

Full Circuit (2013–present)
- Length: 1.900 km (1.181 mi)
- Turns: 10

Full Circuit (1973–2012)
- Length: 1.730 km (1.075 mi)
- Turns: 10
- Race lap record: 0:50.184 ( (Portugal) Tiago Monteiro, Dallara F399, 2001, F3)

Circuit de Croix-en-Ternois is a race track in the north of France, near the small town of Croix-en-Ternois.

The circuit is 1.900 km (1.181 mi) long and is known for its long main straight and twisty in-field section. The circuit is used very regularly for various car and bike race meetings, and is also frequently open for track days. The circuit is also used by the British Motorcycle Racing Club as a round of their annual race calendar.

The circuit was also occasionally used to test Formula One cars.

== Lap records ==
The fastest official race lap records at the Circuit de Croix-en-Ternois are listed as:

| Category | Time | Driver | Vehicle | Event |
Full Circuit (1973–2012): 1.730 km (1.075 mi)
| Formula Three | 0:50.184 | Tiago Monteiro | Dallara F399 | 2001 Croix-en-Ternois French F3 round |
| Formula Renault 2.0 | 0:53.470 | Alexandre Premat | Tatuus FR2000 | 2002 Croix-en-Ternois French Formula Renault round |
| Silhouette racing car | 0:55.828 | Jean-Philippe Dayraut | BMW M3 Coupe Silhouette | 2001 Croix-en-Ternois French Supertouring round |
| Group A | 1:06.130 | Alain Cudini | Mercedes 190 E 2.3-16 | 1987 Croix-en-Ternois French Supertouring Group A round |
