= Bruno Besson =

French racing driver

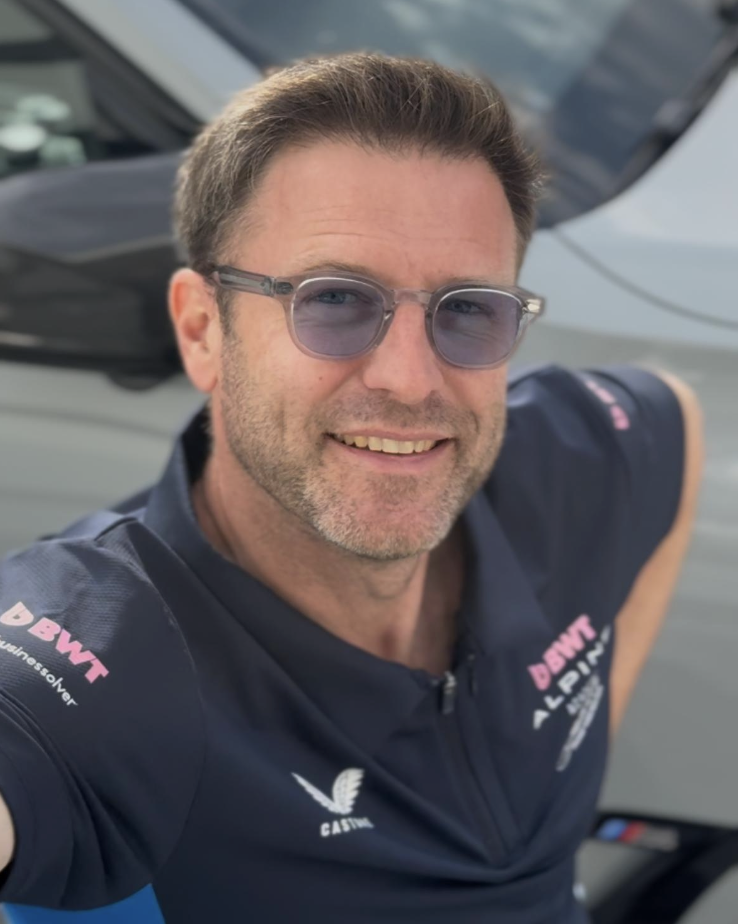
- Besson in 2025
- Nationality: (France) French
- Born: Bruno Christian Jacques Besson; 26 September 1979 (age 47) St. Germain-en-Laye, France
- Categorisation: FIA Gold

Bruno Christian Jacques Besson (born 26 September 1979 in St. Germain-en-Laye) is a French former racing driver.

A Eurocup Formula Renault champion in 1998, Besson then went on to compete in French Formula Three and Formula Palmer Audi. He reached second-tier World Series by Nissan in 2003, managing three podiums and a pole position with Saulnier Racing.

Besson's later career was spent in sports car racing, finishing runner-up in the 2004 FFSA GT Championship in a Chrysler Viper GTS-R and twice entering the 24 Hours of Le Mans in LMP1.

Since 2008, Besson has been a driver coach for the new generations of single-seater drivers, most recently working for the Alpine Academy.

== Racing record ==
=== Complete World Series by Nissan results ===
(key) (Races in bold indicate pole position) (Races in italics indicate fastest lap)

| Year | Entrant | 1 | 2 | 3 | 4 | 5 | 6 | 7 | 8 | 9 | 10 | 11 | 12 | 13 | 14 | 15 | 16 | 17 | 18 | DC | Points |
|---|---|---|---|---|---|---|---|---|---|---|---|---|---|---|---|---|---|---|---|---|---|
| 2003 | Saulnier Racing | JAR1; 1; 5 | JAR1; 2; 7 | ZOL; 1; 10 | ZOL; 2; 4 | MAG; 1; 2 | **MAG**; **2**; 3 | MNZ; 1; 7 | MNZ; 2; 8 | LAU; 1; 12 | LAU; 2; 9 | A1R; 1; 5 | A1R; 2; 5 | CAT; 1; 9 | CAT; 2 Ret | VAL; 1; 2 | VAL; 2 Ret | JAR2; 1 Ret | JAR2; 2; 8 | 9th | 95 |

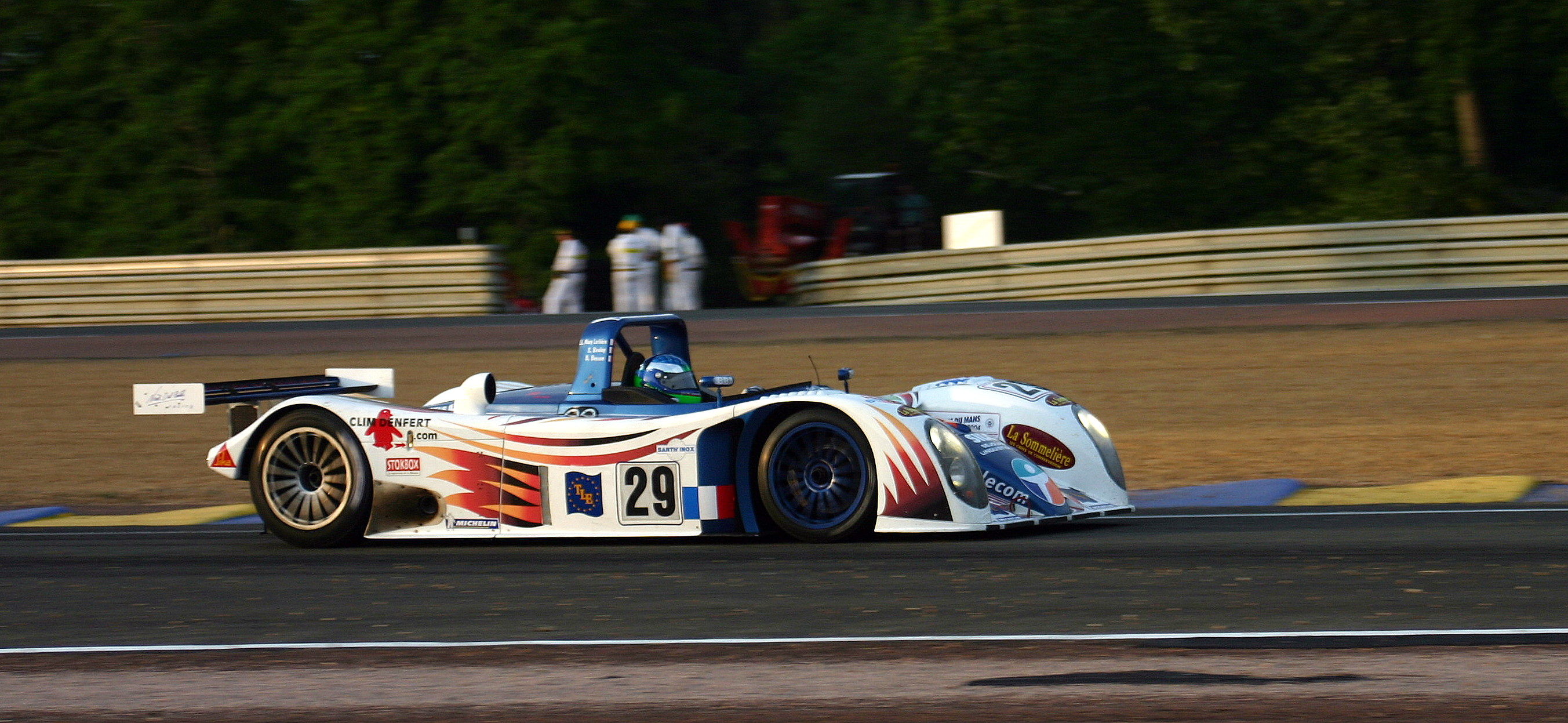
Besson's Reynard at Le Mans in 2004.

=== 24 Hours of Le Mans results ===
| Year | Team | Co-Drivers | Car | Class | Laps | Pos. | Class Pos. |
|---|---|---|---|---|---|---|---|
| 2004 | (France) Noël del Bello Racing | (France) Sylvain Boulay (France) Jean-Luc Maury-Laribière | Reynard 2KQ-Volkswagen | LMP1 | 122 | DNF | DNF |
| 2007 | (France) Courage Compétition | (Switzerland) Alexander Frei (France) Jonathan Cochet | Courage LC70-AER | LMP1 | 304 | 26th | 9th |

Sporting positions
| Preceded by Jeffrey van Hooydonk | Eurocup Formula Renault champion 1998 | Succeeded by Gianmaria Bruni |
