= Superleague Formula round Spain =

Auto race

- Circuito del Jarama / Circuito de Jerez / Circuito de Navarra

Event information
- No. of events: 4
- First held: 2008
- Last held: 2010
- Most wins (club): (China) Beijing Guoan 3
- Most wins (driver): (Australia) John Martin 3

Last event (2010 Navarra) winners
Race 1	(China) Beijing Guoan	John Martin
Race 2	(Portugal) F.C. Porto	Álvaro Parente
S. Final	(China) Beijing Guoan	John Martin

The Superleague Formula round Spain is a round of the Superleague Formula. After hosting events at Circuito de Jerez in 2008 and Circuito del Jarama in 2009, Spain will be hosting two rounds during 2010, the first again to Circuito del Jarama and the second at the newly opened Circuito de Navarra in Los Arcos.

== Winners ==
Season	Race	Club	Driver	Location	Date	Report
2008	R1	(Italy) A.C. Milan	(Netherlands) Robert Doornbos	Circuito de Jerez	November 23	Report
2008	R2	(Germany) Borussia Dortmund	(United Kingdom) James Walker	Circuito de Jerez	November 23	Report
2009	R1	(Belgium) R.S.C. Anderlecht	(Netherlands) Yelmer Buurman	Circuito del Jarama	November 8	Report
2009	R2	(Turkey) Galatasaray S.K.	(China) Ho-Pin Tung	Circuito del Jarama	November 8	Report
2009	SF	(Belgium) R.S.C. Anderlecht	(Netherlands) Yelmer Buurman	Circuito del Jarama	November 8	Report
2010	R1	(China) Beijing Guoan	(Australia) John Martin	Circuito del Jarama	June 20	Report
2010	R2	(France) GD Bordeaux	(France) Franck Montagny	Circuito del Jarama	June 20	Report
2010	SF	(Greece) Olympiacos CFP	(New Zealand) Chris van der Drift	Circuito del Jarama	June 20	Report
2010	R1	(China) Beijing Guoan	(Australia) John Martin	Circuito de Navarra	October 24	Report
2010	R2	(Portugal) F.C. Porto	(Portugal) Álvaro Parente	Circuito de Navarra	October 24	Report
2010	SF	(China) Beijing Guoan	(Australia) John Martin	Circuito de Navarra	October 24	Report
