= 2009 Superleague Formula season =

Motorsport season

Seasons
- ← 2008 2010 →

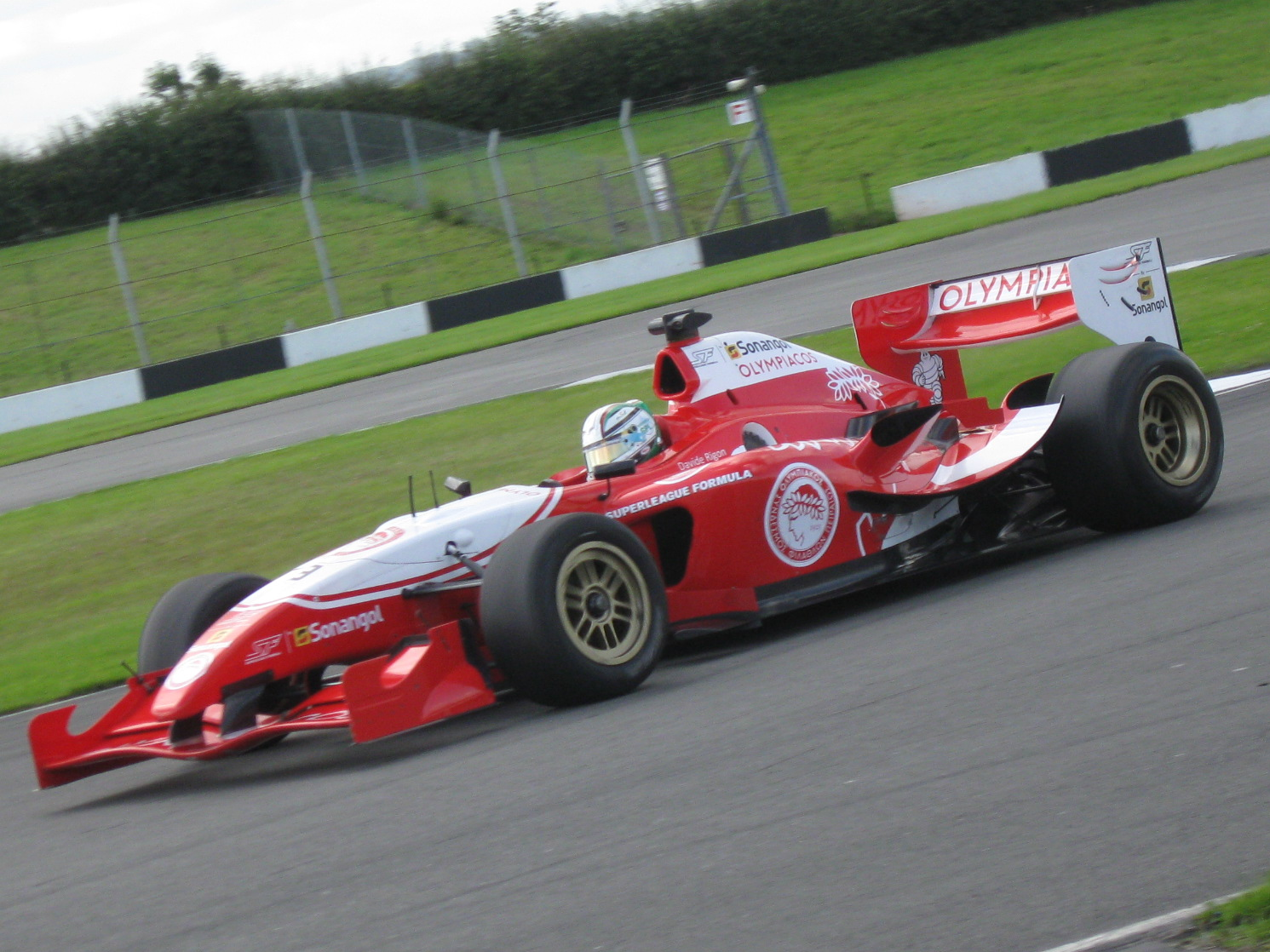
Olympiacos CFP (Davide Rigon) at Superleague Formula Round 3

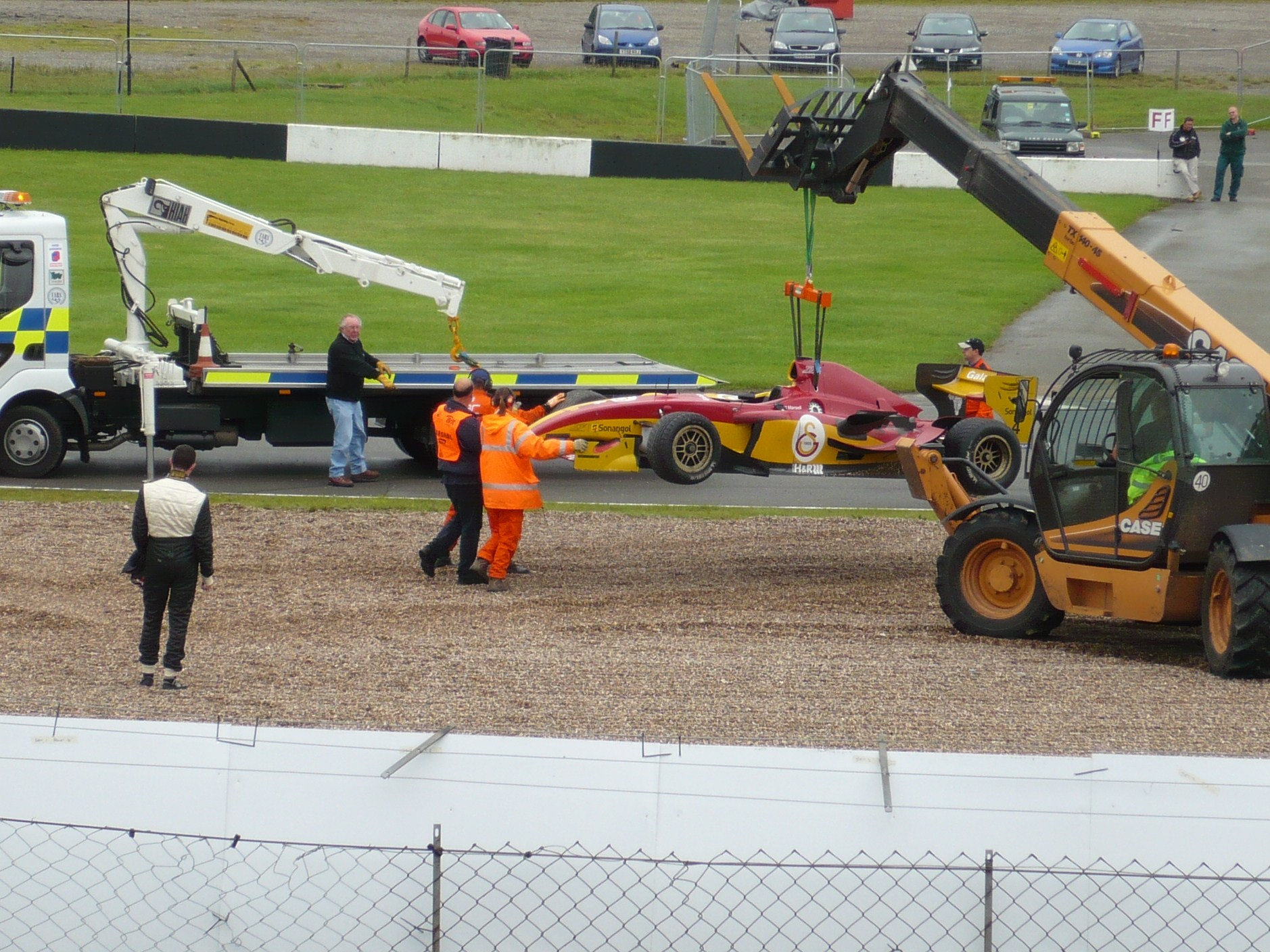
Galatasaray S.K. (Scott Mansell) car retrieved during third practice at Superleague Formula Round 3

The 2009 Superleague Formula season was the second Superleague Formula championship. The series was rebranded the "Superleague Formula by Sonangol" for this season and also 2010 with the Angolan oil company becoming the title sponsor. It began on June 28 at Magny-Cours and finished on November 8 at Jarama.

The field remained at 18 clubs for the 2009 season but Beijing Guoan did not return to try to retain the title which they won with Davide Rigon in 2008, however Rigon did return in the car of Olympiacos CFP despite GP2 commitments. In Estoril, María de Villota became the first woman to race in the series and Sébastien Bourdais became the most successful racing driver to enter the series having been dropped by Scuderia Toro Rosso just weeks earlier. Bourdais described Superleague as "the best alternative to F1".

Liverpool F.C., run under Hitech Junior Team with driver Adrián Vallés, were crowned series champions for the first time at the last event of the season.

== Teams and drivers ==
- All teams competed on Michelin tyres.

Entrant	Race team	No.	Race driver(s)	Rounds
(Portugal) Sporting CP	(Germany) Zakspeed	2	(Portugal) Pedro Petiz	All
(Italy) A.C. Milan	(Belgium) Azerti Motorsport	3	(Italy) Giorgio Pantano	All
(Turkey) Galatasaray S.K.	(United Kingdom) Ultimate Motorsport (United Kingdom) Reid Motorsport	4	(United Kingdom) Duncan Tappy	1–2
(Turkey) Galatasaray S.K.	(United Kingdom) Ultimate Motorsport (United Kingdom) Reid Motorsport	4	(United Kingdom) Scott Mansell	3
(Turkey) Galatasaray S.K.	(United Kingdom) Ultimate Motorsport (United Kingdom) Reid Motorsport	4	(China) Ho-Pin Tung	4–6
(Netherlands) PSV Eindhoven	(Belgium) Azerti Motorsport	5	(Netherlands) Dominick Muermans	1–3
(Netherlands) PSV Eindhoven	(Belgium) Azerti Motorsport	5	(Netherlands) Carlo van Dam	4–6
(United Arab Emirates) Al Ain	(United Kingdom) Ultimate Motorsport (United Kingdom) Reid Motorsport	6	(Spain) Miguel Molina	1
(United Arab Emirates) Al Ain	(United Kingdom) Ultimate Motorsport (United Kingdom) Reid Motorsport	6	(Argentina) Esteban Guerrieri	2
(Spain) Sevilla FC	(United Kingdom) Ultimate Motorsport (United Kingdom) Reid Motorsport	18	(Argentina) Esteban Guerrieri	3
(Spain) Sevilla FC	(United Kingdom) Ultimate Motorsport (United Kingdom) Reid Motorsport	18	(France) Sébastien Bourdais	4–6
(Brazil) CR Flamengo	(United Kingdom) Delta Motorsport/ADR	7	(Brazil) Enrique Bernoldi	1–3
(Brazil) CR Flamengo	(Belgium) Azerti Motorsport	7	(Brazil) Enrique Bernoldi	4, 6
(Brazil) CR Flamengo	(Belgium) Azerti Motorsport	7	(United Kingdom) Jonathan Kennard	5
(Belgium) R.S.C. Anderlecht	(Germany) Zakspeed	8	(Netherlands) Yelmer Buurman	All
(Greece) Olympiacos CFP	(Germany) GU-Racing International	9	(Italy) Davide Rigon	1–3
(Greece) Olympiacos CFP	(Germany) GU-Racing International	9	(Argentina) Esteban Guerrieri	4–6
(Switzerland) FC Basel 1893	(Germany) GU-Racing International	10	(Germany) Max Wissel	All
(Brazil) SC Corinthians	(United Kingdom) Alan Docking Racing	14	(Brazil) Antônio Pizzonia	All
(Spain) Atlético Madrid	(United Kingdom) Alan Docking Racing	15	(China) Ho-Pin Tung	1–3
(Spain) Atlético Madrid	(United Kingdom) Alan Docking Racing	15	(Spain) María de Villota	4–6
(Portugal) F.C. Porto	(United Kingdom) Hitech Junior Team	16	(France) Tristan Gommendy	1–3, 5–6
(Portugal) F.C. Porto	(United Kingdom) Hitech Junior Team	16	(Portugal) Álvaro Parente	4
(Scotland) Rangers F.C.	(United Kingdom) Alan Docking Racing	17	(Australia) John Martin	All
(England) Tottenham Hotspur	(United Kingdom) Alan Docking Racing	19	(United Kingdom) Craig Dolby	All
(England) Liverpool F.C.	(United Kingdom) Hitech Junior Team	21	(Spain) Adrián Vallés	All
(Italy) A.S. Roma	(Belgium) Azerti Motorsport	22	(United Kingdom) Jonathan Kennard	1–3
(Italy) A.S. Roma	(United Kingdom) Alan Docking Racing	22	(France) Franck Perera	4
(Italy) A.S. Roma	(United Kingdom) Alan Docking Racing	22	(France) Julien Jousse	5–6
(Denmark) FC Midtjylland	(United Kingdom) Hitech Junior Team	24	(Denmark) Kasper Andersen	All
(France) Olympique Lyonnais	(France) Barazi-Epsilon	69	(France) Nelson Panciatici	All
Sources:

- Giorgio Pantano had signed an official deal with Al Ain before the team announced they would not be able to compete in this season. A week later however, they changed their decision and entered the championship with drivers Miguel Molina and Esteban Guerrieri before having Sevilla FC take their place from round 3 at Donington Park.
- Beijing Guoan and Borussia Dortmund did not compete this year.
- FC Midtjylland, Olympique Lyonnais and Sporting CP made their debut in 2009.
- CR Flamengo and A.S. Roma swapped race teams prior to round 4 of the series, with Flamengo switching from ADR to Azerti and Roma going the other way.
- Reid Motorsport took over the cars of Galatasaray S.K. and Sevilla FC from Ultimate Motorsport prior to round 5 at the Autodromo Nazionale Monza.

=== Test/reserve drivers ===
Driver	Driver
(Estonia) Marko Asmer	(United Kingdom) Greg Mansell
(Colombia) Carlos Gaitán	(Netherlands) Paul Meijer
(France) Bruce Jouanny	(France) Nelson Philippe
(Greece) Stamatis Katsimis	(Canada) Jacques Villeneuve

=== Driver changes ===
Changed teams

- Yelmer Buurman: PSV Eindhoven → R.S.C. Anderlecht
- Craig Dolby: R.S.C. Anderlecht → Tottenham Hotspur
- Davide Rigon: Beijing Guoan → Olympiacos CFP
- Duncan Tappy: Tottenham Hotspur → Galatasaray S.K.

Entering/Re-Entering Superleague Formula

- Enrique Bernoldi: IndyCar Series (Conquest Racing) → CR Flamengo
- Jonathan Kennard: Sabbatical → A.S. Roma
- John Martin: British Formula Three Championship (Räikkönen Robertson Racing) → Rangers F.C.
- Miguel Molina: World Series by Renault (Prema Powerteam) → Al Ain
- Nelson Panciatici: Spanish Formula Three Championship (Hache International) → Olympique Lyonnais
- Giorgio Pantano: GP2 Series (Racing Engineering) → A.C. Milan
- Pedro Petiz: Porsche Supercup (Racing Team Jetstream) → Sporting CP
- Ho-Pin Tung: GP2 Series (Trident Racing) → Atlético Madrid

Leaving Superleague Formula

- Bertrand Baguette: Al Ain → World Series by Renault (Draco Racing)
- Ryan Dalziel: Rangers F.C. → Rolex Sports Car Series (Alegra Motorsports)
- Robert Doornbos: A.C. Milan → IndyCar Series (Newman/Haas/Lanigan Racing)
- Borja García: Sevilla FC → Atlantic Championship (Condor Motorsports)
- Stamatis Katsimis: Olympiacos CFP → Greek Rally Championship (Mitsubishi Lancer)
- Alessandro Pier Guidi: Galatasaray S.K. → FIA GT Championship (Vitaphone Racing)
- Tuka Rocha: CR Flamengo → Sabbatical
- Andy Soucek: Atlético Madrid → FIA Formula Two Championship
- Enrico Toccacelo: Borussia Dortmund → Sabbatical
- James Walker: Borussia Dortmund → World Series by Renault (P1 Motorsport)

==== Mid-season changes ====
- Carlo van Dam replaced Dominick Muermans at PSV Eindhoven at the midway point of the season.
- Franck Perera replaced Jonathan Kennard at A.S. Roma also at the midway point of the season. Julien Jousse replaced Perera to complete the final two rounds for A.S. Roma.
- Enrique Bernoldi was replaced by Jonathan Kennard at CR Flamengo at the Monza round while Bernoldi was on FIA GT Championship duty.
- Duncan Tappy was replaced by Scott Mansell at Galatasaray S.K. at the Donington round. Ho-Pin Tung replaced Mansell after Donington and completed the rest of the season for Galatasaray.
- Miguel Molina was replaced by Esteban Guerrieri at Al Ain at the Zolder round. Al Ain left the series after the Zolder round. Guerrieri represented Sevilla FC at the Donington round.
- Sébastien Bourdais replaced Esteben Guerrieri at Sevilla FC from the Estoril round onwards to complete the season for Sevilla.
- Esteban Guerrieri replaced Davide Rigon at Olympiacos CFP from the Estoril round onwards to complete the season for Olympiacos.
- Ho-Pin Tung was replaced by María de Villota at Atlético Madrid at the Estoril round. María de Villota completed the season for Atlético Madrid.
- Álvaro Parente replaced the injured Tristan Gommendy at F.C. Porto at the Estoril round.

== 2009 schedule ==
- The calendar for the season was announced on January 29, 2009.
- Adding to last year's qualifying and race format, a third 'Super Final' race was added to 4 out of the 6 events for the top six points scorers from the weekend's first two races (although it was initially the top three finishers from the two races qualifying – it was changed prior to round 4 of the season). The six cars raced to decide a 'Weekend Winner' and to whom the top prize money would go but no points were awarded for this race.
- Official race commentary on the SF World Feed same from Ben Edwards and Bruce Jouanny for every round of the season. Jonathan Green and Martin Haven have also featured in the commentary box. Ben Constanduros and Warren Pole were the pitlane reporters and interviewers.

=== Race calendar and results ===
Round		Race	Date	Pole position	Fastest lap	Winning club	Winning team	Weekend winner	Report
1	R1	(France) Magny-Cours	June 28	(Brazil) SC Corinthians	(England) Tottenham Hotspur	(England) Liverpool F.C.	(United Kingdom) Hitech Junior Team	(England) Liverpool F.C. (from Race 3 result)	Report
1	R2	(France) Magny-Cours	June 28		(Brazil) SC Corinthians	(Italy) A.C. Milan	(Belgium) Azerti Motorsport	(England) Liverpool F.C. (from Race 3 result)	Report
2	R1	(Belgium) Zolder	July 19	(Denmark) FC Midtjylland	(Switzerland) FC Basel 1893	(England) Tottenham Hotspur	(United Kingdom) Alan Docking Racing	(England) Liverpool F.C. (from total points)	Report
2	R2	(Belgium) Zolder	July 19		(England) Tottenham Hotspur	(United Arab Emirates) Al Ain	(United Kingdom) Ultimate Motorsport	(England) Liverpool F.C. (from total points)	Report
3	R1	(United Kingdom) Donington Park	August 2	(Brazil) SC Corinthians	(Switzerland) FC Basel 1893	(Switzerland) FC Basel 1893	(Germany) GU-Racing International	(Scotland) Rangers F.C. (from Race 3 result)	Report
3	R2	(United Kingdom) Donington Park	August 2		(Brazil) SC Corinthians	(Portugal) F.C. Porto	(United Kingdom) Hitech Junior Team	(Scotland) Rangers F.C. (from Race 3 result)	Report
4	R1	(Portugal) Estoril	September 6	(Brazil) SC Corinthians	(Belgium) R.S.C. Anderlecht	(Greece) Olympiacos CFP	(Germany) GU-Racing International	(Spain) Sevilla FC (from Race 3 result)	Report
4	R2	(Portugal) Estoril	September 6		(Switzerland) FC Basel 1893	(Portugal) F.C. Porto	(United Kingdom) Hitech Junior Team	(Spain) Sevilla FC (from Race 3 result)	Report
5	R1	(Italy) Monza	October 4	(Greece) Olympiacos CFP	(Brazil) SC Corinthians	(Spain) Sevilla FC	(United Kingdom) Reid Motorsport	(Spain) Sevilla FC (from total points)	Report
5	R2	(Italy) Monza	October 4		(Greece) Olympiacos CFP	(Portugal) Sporting CP	(Germany) Zakspeed	(Spain) Sevilla FC (from total points)	Report
6	R1	(Spain) Jarama	November 8	(Spain) Sevilla FC	(Belgium) R.S.C. Anderlecht	(Belgium) R.S.C. Anderlecht	(Germany) Zakspeed	(Belgium) R.S.C. Anderlecht (from Race 3 result)	Report
6	R2	(Spain) Jarama	November 8		(Portugal) F.C. Porto	(Turkey) Galatasaray S.K.	(United Kingdom) Reid Motorsport	(Belgium) R.S.C. Anderlecht (from Race 3 result)	Report
Sources:

- Race 2 starts with reverse grid from finishing order of Race 1.

=== Test calendar and results ===
- There was an initial shakedown of the new car at Magny-Cours, France on April 28, 2009 by the Alan Docking Racing team. Australian John Martin completed laps of the circuit in the updated Rangers F.C. car, before signing up to drive for them. There were further tests at Zolder, Belgium from June 17–18 in which no real pacesetter was obvious, although Dominick Muermans and John Martin put in solid runs to go quickest. Prior to the opening round, most cars tested at Magny-Cours on June 26 in which Adrián Vallés for Liverpool F.C. and Hitech Junior Team was ultimately fastest.

== Championship standings ==
Pos	Entrant	Drivers	(France) MAG		(Belgium) ZOL		(United Kingdom) DON		(Portugal) EST		(Italy) MOZ		(Spain) JAR		Pts
Pos	Entrant	Drivers	R1	R2	R1	R2	R1	R2	R1	R2	R1	R2	R1	R2	Pts
1	(England) Liverpool F.C.	(Spain) Adrián Vallés	1	6	3	3	6	6	2	9	4	5	7	4	412
2	(England) Tottenham Hotspur	(England) Craig Dolby	3	10	1	9	5	4	8	18	5	2	4	2	382
3	(Switzerland) FC Basel 1893	(Germany) Max Wissel	10	3	4	8	1	3	DN	11	9	14	5	8	308
4	(Belgium) R.S.C. Anderlecht	(Netherlands) Yelmer Buurman	2	5	8	14	16	DN	4	4	6	6	1	15	305
5	(Portugal) F.C. Porto	(France) Tristan Gommendy	16	7	12	7	8	1			7	13	6	5	302
5	(Portugal) F.C. Porto	(Portugal) Álvaro Parente							16	1					302
6	(Greece) Olympiacos CFP	(Italy) Davide Rigon	18	**2**	10	4	17	15							300
6	(Greece) Olympiacos CFP	(Argentina) Esteban Guerrieri							1	14	**2**	4	8	10	300
7	(Italy) A.C. Milan	(Italy) Giorgio Pantano	12	1	5	11	4	17	6	6	15	11	3	14	286
8	(Brazil) SC Corinthians	(Brazil) Antônio Pizzonia	**4**	9	17	**12**	**3**	8	**3**	5	10	9	14	18	264
9	(Spain) Sevilla FC	(Argentina) Esteban Guerrieri					11	13							253
9	(Spain) Sevilla FC	(France) Sébastien Bourdais							11	2	1	3	**2**	6	253
10	(Scotland) Rangers F.C.	(Australia) John Martin	17	16	2	15	2	16	5	8	11	12	10	9	241
11	(Turkey) Galatasaray S.K.	(England) Duncan Tappy	5	11	9	16									239
11	(Turkey) Galatasaray S.K.	(England) Scott Mansell					13	12							239
11	(Turkey) Galatasaray S.K.	(China) Ho-Pin Tung							17	**7**	8	7	16	1	239
12	(Portugal) Sporting CP	(Portugal) Pedro Petiz	7	17	16	13	12	2	9	17	18	**1**	13	13	215
13	(Italy) A.S. Roma	(England) Jonathan Kennard	15	14	11	5	7	10							211
13	(Italy) A.S. Roma	(France) Franck Perera							7	12					211
13	(Italy) A.S. Roma	(France) Julien Jousse									3	17	15	16	211
14	(Denmark) FC Midtjylland	(Denmark) Kasper Andersen	8	15	**13**	6	10	5	15	16	12	16	18	**3**	203
15	(Spain) Atlético Madrid	(China) Ho-Pin Tung	14	12	18	2	9	7							202
15	(Spain) Atlético Madrid	(Spain) María de Villota							14	13	14	10	17	7	202
16	(Brazil) CR Flamengo	(Brazil) Enrique Bernoldi	6	8	7	18	18	**14**	13	3			11	12	191
16	(Brazil) CR Flamengo	(England) Jonathan Kennard									17	18			191
17	(France) Olympique Lyonnais	(France) Nelson Panciatici	13	13	14	10	14	9	12	15	13	15	9	11	160
18	(Netherlands) PSV Eindhoven	(Netherlands) Dominick Muermans	11	18	15	17	15	11							145
18	(Netherlands) PSV Eindhoven	(Netherlands) Carlo van Dam							10	10	16	8	12	17	145
19	(United Arab Emirates) Al Ain	(Spain) Miguel Molina	9	4											135
19	(United Arab Emirates) Al Ain	(Argentina) Esteban Guerrieri			6	1	WD								135
Pos	Entrant	Drivers	R1	R2	R1	R2	R1	R2	R1	R2	R1	R2	R1	R2	Pts
Pos	Entrant	Drivers	(France) MAG		(Belgium) ZOL		(United Kingdom) DON		(Portugal) EST		(Italy) MOZ		(Spain) JAR		Pts

Colour	Result
Gold	Winner
Silver	2nd place
Bronze	3rd place
Green	Finished
Purple	Did not finish
Red	Did not qualify (X)
Black	Disqualified (DQ)
White	Did not start (DN)
White	Race cancelled (C)
Blank	Excluded (EX)
Blank	Withdrew (WD)
**Bold**	Pole position
Italics	Fastest lap

NOTE – R2 starts
with reverse grid

Position	1st	2nd	3rd	4th	5th	6th	7th	8th	9th	10th	11th	12th	13th	14th	15th	16th	17th	18th	19th	20th	21st	22nd	DNS	Ref
Points	50	45	40	36	32	29	26	23	20	18	16	14	12	10	8	7	6	5	4	3	2	1	0	
