= Rangers F.C. (Superleague Formula team) =

Scottish motor racing team

Rangers F.C. SF Racing Team
Founded	2008
Country	Scotland
Driver(s)	Ryan Dalziel (2008); James Walker (2008); John Martin (2009)
First race	2008 Donington
Last race	2009 Jarama
Rounds	12
Ch'ships	0
Total points	468 (including Super Finals)
2010 position	n/a (n/a pts)
Races / Poles / Wins / Podiums / F. Laps; 24 / 0 / 0 / 2 / 0
NOTE - Data not including Super Finals

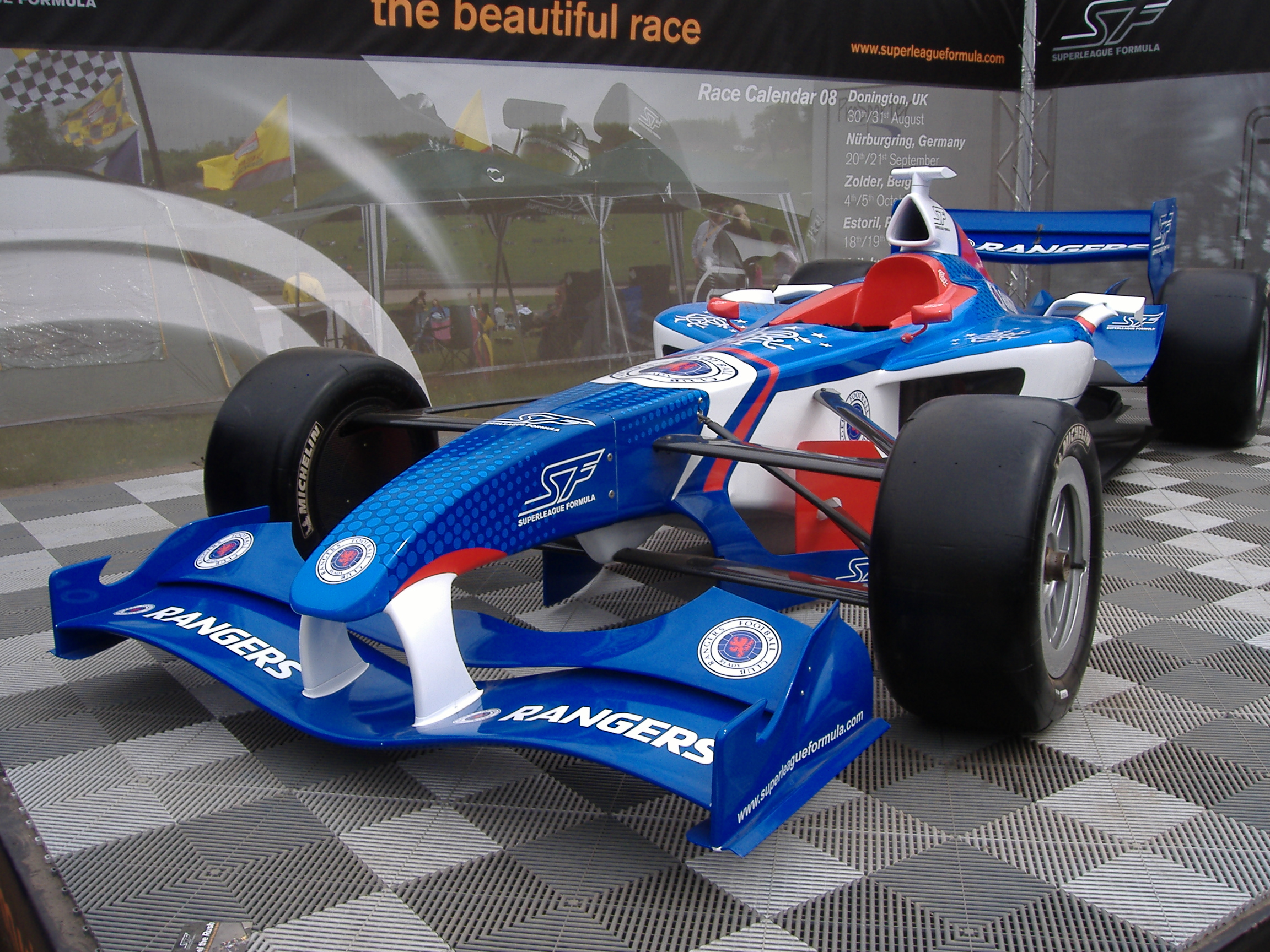
The Rangers car out on display (2008)

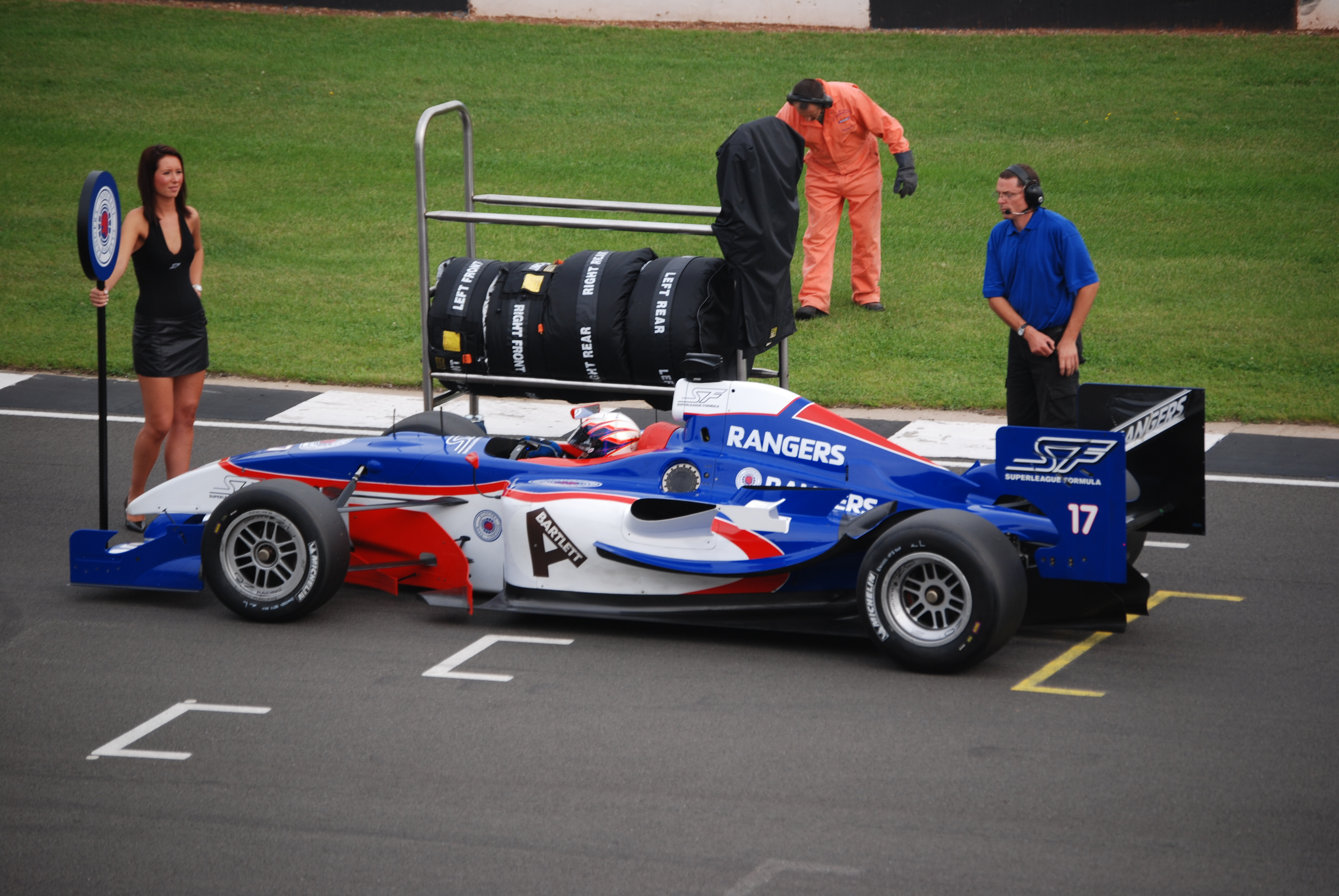
Ryan Dalziel on the grid during the 2008 Donington weekend.

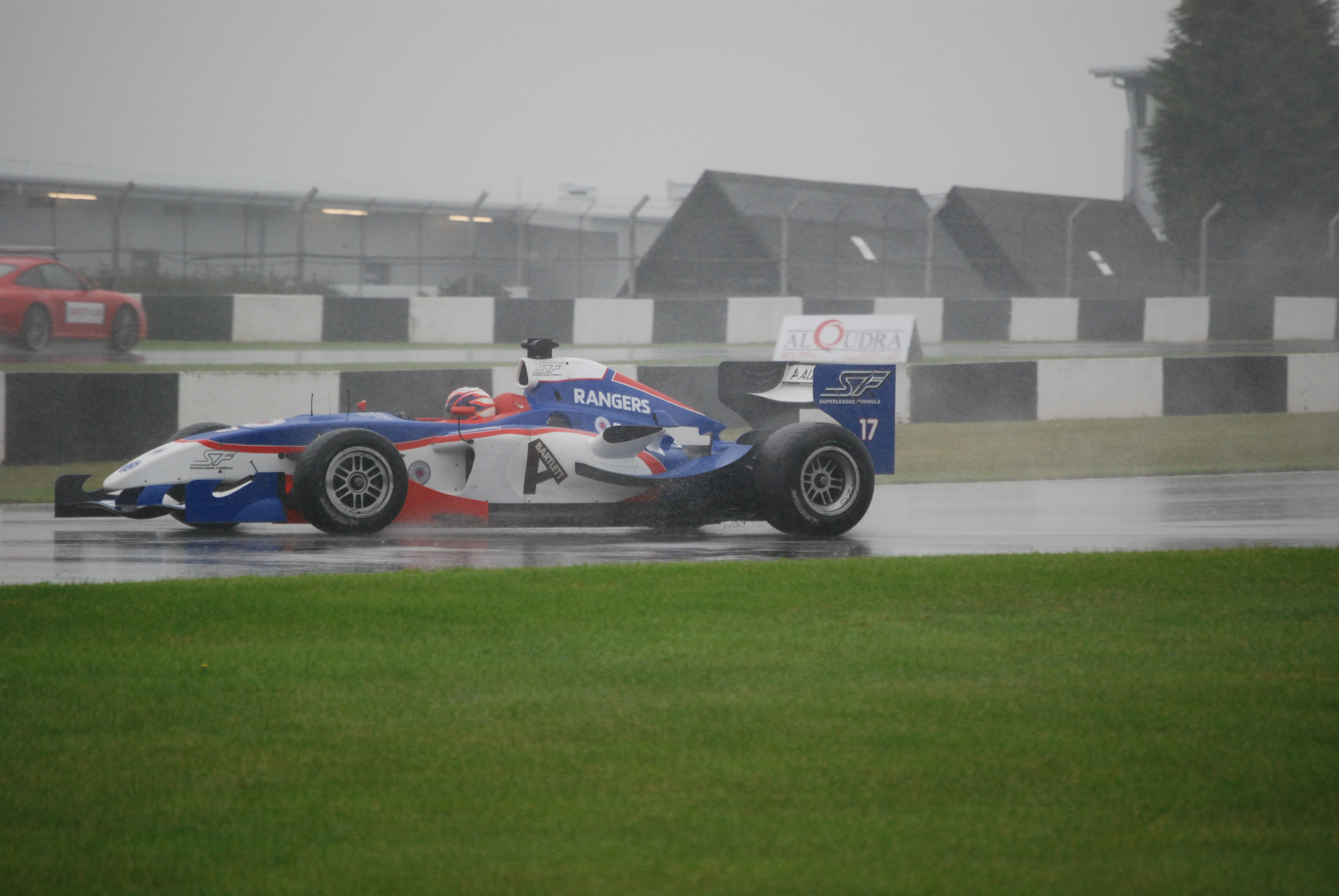
Ryan Dalziel during race 2 on a wet Donington Park track in 2008.

Rangers FC Superleague Formula team was the open wheel single seater motor racing team of Rangers, which competed in the Superleague Formula in the 2008 and 2009 seasons. It was operated by Alan Docking Racing for both seasons, although Team West-Tec operated the team in the 2008 pre-season. The car was revealed outside Ibrox Stadium with the Rangers first team present, including manager Walter Smith.

Ryan Dalziel drove in the team's maiden season. James Walker also drove for the team in one round of the 2008 season and posted their best result, a fourth-place finish.

In the 2009 season, Australian John Martin was the driver, posting three podium places including a win at Donington Park.

== 2008 season ==
In 2008 Ryan Dalziel drove for Rangers F.C. in the team's maiden season finished overall in the mid table in 13th. It was only 1 of 3 teams that completed the whole season (a world record at the time) but did not get on to the podium. James Walker also drove for the team in one round of the 2008 season and posted their best result, a fourth-place finish.

== 2009 season ==
For the 2009 season, Australian John Martin drove for the team. It was a more successful season, yielding three podium places including one win at Donington Park.

In the first round of the season Rangers F.C. had a bad weekend. In race one they got caught up in a mistake from Olympiacos CFP (Davide Rigon) eliminating them from the race. In race 2 Rangers F.C. led after lap 1 and built up a lead before the pitstop window opened. The car got stuck on the jack in the pits and lost 35 seconds coming out in 13th place. After that driver John Martin made a small mistake putting Rangers F.C. out of the race.

At the Zolder round Rangers F.C. got to their first 'Pole Shoot Out' of qualifying and narrowly lost out on pole to FC Midtjylland (Kasper Andersen). They followed this up with a debut podium, finishing in second place. In the second race of the day at Circuit Zolder Rangers F.C. retired early with gearbox problems.

At the Donington round, the team claimed their second podium in the Superleague Formula. They were in position to win race one before being impeded by PSV Eindhoven (Dominick Muermans) allowing FC Basel to get their first win. Rangers F.C. finished second. In race two John Martin and Rangers F.C. crashed into A.C. Milan (Giorgio Pantano) ending both teams races. In the 6 car 'Super Final' Rangers F.C. and John Martin claimed their first (and only) Superleague Formula win, passing FC Basel 1893 (Max Wissel) with 2 laps to go.

The Estoril round was the first time Rangers F.C. finished both races in that season. They claimed a 5th place and an 8th place. During race two Rangers F.C. had an incident with Atlético Madrid (María de Villota) which sent both teams spinning and dropping two places.

== 2010 season ==
The Rangers team did not compete in the 2010 Superleague Formula season as it was not named in the provisional entry list, which included which race teams might operate each car.

== Record ==
(key)

=== 2008 ===
Operator(s)	Driver(s)	1		2		3		4		5		6		Points	Rank
Operator(s)	Driver(s)	DON		NÜR		ZOL		EST		VAL		JER		Points	Rank
Alan Docking Racing	(United Kingdom) Ryan Dalziel	8	14			8	17	13	15	5	7	15	6	227	13th
Alan Docking Racing	(United Kingdom) James Walker			4	12									227	13th

=== 2009 ===
- Super Final results in 2009 did not count for points towards the main championship.

Operator(s)	Driver(s)	1			2			3			4			5			6			Points	Rank
Operator(s)	Driver(s)	MAG			ZOL			DON			EST			MOZ			JAR			Points	Rank
Alan Docking Racing	(Australia) John Martin	17	16	X	2	15	–	2	16	1	5	8	X	11	12	–	10	9	X	241	10th
