= Premier 1 Grand Prix =

- Category: Single seater
- Drivers: 24
- Official website: www.premier1grandprix.com

Premier 1 Grand Prix was intended to be a motor racing series which aspired to have each car branded in the colours of a particular football team. It was intended that up to thirty football clubs were interested in being included as teams in Premier 1 Grand Prix and it had included Tottenham Hotspur, R.S.C. Anderlecht, Leeds United, Benfica, Olympique Lyonnais, Chelsea F.C., Valencia and Feyenoord to have included cars in a race series which held races on fifteen racing circuits in Europe, Latin America and Asia.

== History ==
The foundation of the series commenced in 2001 in a "Marketing and Promotional Concept" idea brought forward by SMC Capital Investments who funded the series. It was intended to attract football fans to motor racing. The consortium was set up by the motor racing and football enthusiast Colin Sullivan who presented the idea to Graham Kelly, the former chief executive of The Football Association. Premier 1 Grand Prix's research claimed that 40% of football season ticket holders had a keen interest in motor racing. Heinz Schurtenberger, the former International Sport and Leisure chief executive, was employed by the series in February 2001 and worked alongside the former marketing manager of the Williams Grand Prix Engineering team Gary Crumpler, of C Force Communications, in promoting the championship.

In October 2001, the FIA World Motor Sports Council granted the series provisional backing to cover its sporting and technical regulations, after the United Kingdom's national motor racing governing body, the Motor Sports Association, formally submitted plans for the venture. In the following month, however, the beginning of Premier 1 Grand Prix was deferred until March 2003 as series officials required extra time to finalise commercial arrangements for the championship. The series took a pause in their plans so their office in Switzerland could be shut down and the company relocated their operations to the United Kingdom. They attracted the series director and administrator of the British Touring Car Championship Alan J. Gow to their board and elected not to publicise their move and instead focused themselves on meeting their objectives. In October 2002, Premier 1 Grand Prix's operations director Robin Webb announced the second deferral of the series to 2004. The series collapsed in 2003 without having held a race.

== Calendar ==
The series was originally planned to host twelve races in 2002; eleven in Europe and one in South America. The date of the races were chosen as not to clash with any Formula One World Championship races.

=== Proposed calendar for 2002 ===
| Round | Circuit | Location | Date |
|---|---|---|---|
| 1 | (Portugal) Autódromo do Estoril | Estoril, Portugal | 14 July 2002 |
| 2 | (Germany) EuroSpeedway Lausitz | Brandenburg, Germany | 4 August 2002 |
| 3 | (France) Dijon-Prenois | Dijon, France | 11 August 2002 |
| 4 | (United Kingdom) Donington Park | Castle Donington, England | 25 August 2002 |
| 5 | (Netherlands) Circuit Park Zandvoort | Zandvoort, Netherlands | 8 September 2002 |
| 6 | (Czech Republic) Brno Circuit | Brno, Czech Republic | 29 September 2002 |
| 7 | (Italy) Misano Circuit | Misano, Italy | 6 October 2002 |
| 8 | (Spain) Circuit Ricardo Tormo | Valencia, Spain | 20 October 2002 |
| 9 | (Argentina) Autódromo Juan y Oscar Gálvez | Buenos Aires, Argentina | 3 November 2002 |
| 10 | (Brazil) Autódromo Internacional Nelson Piquet | Rio de Janeiro, Brazil | 10 November 2002 |

== Rules and regulations ==
A qualifying session was to be held on the Saturday before the race to determine the starting order. Two races lasting either 100 mi (160 km) or one hour, with a half an hour break in between, were planned to be held on the Sunday. Drivers were permitted to switch into a spare car at any point during the race weekend. Should a team have failed to finish the first race, they were permitted to compete in the second event, but would be required to start at the back of the grid.

In contrast to Formula One, cars would not have been permitted to refuel during the events. The total prize fund for each race was set at $1 million and the winner of each event would earn $125,000. Similar to golf, drivers would have been ranked in the championship in the order of the amount of prize money they won. Each driver would come under the management of the racing team they were competing for, and the team was required to employ the mechanics as well. Football clubs would be selected through an analysis of their performance in the past six years in their respective domestic leagues. The clubs were not asked to invest in the series but were entitled to receive a share of television income in return.

== Cars ==
50 identical cars were planned to be built at a rate of six per week. They were intended to have the same power in effort to encourage more competition and would be supplied by Reynard Motorsport after an earlier agreement with Dallara fell through. The project was led by James Bolton who was supervised by the technical director Nick Wirth and the designer John Thompson. The chassis would have been constructed from carbon fibre and kevlar with the shape determined by Formula One standard designs using the latest innovations in finite element method. In contrast, there would be a greater allowance in ground effect aerodynamics to enable close racing and slipstreaming. Cars would additionally feature a data logging system from Pi Research. They were to have a six-speed pneumatic semi-automatic paddle-operated sequential gearbox and a 4 L (240 cu in) V10 engine built by Judd producing more than 750 bhp (560 kW) and would run at 11,500 rpm. The total weight of the car and driver was to have been approximately 650 kg (1,430 lb).

All cars would be run on slick tyres and aimed to have top speeds similar to Formula One cars. Rumours circulated that Avon would be the series' control tyre supplier but the prototype of the car was fitted with Goodyear tyres. The suspension would have consisted of pushrod activated rockers acting on coil spring and the adjustable dampers would have variable rate anti-roll bars. Suspension uprights would be constructed from fabricated steel assemblies with four-wheel carbon brake discs and four piston calipers. Driver aids such as launch control, traction control and anti lock braking system would not be included but cars would feature an electronic gear shift. Every driver would be competing in identical chassis which intended for the emphasis of the racing series to be focused on driving skill and team work and not on which team could spend the most capital developing the best car package. S.S. Collins, author of Unraced...: Formula One's Lost Cars, noted the prototype car bore some resemblance to the Benetton B195 while its final design appeared similar to an International Formula 3000 and Formula Nippon monocoque.

== Legacy ==
In his retrospective analysis of the series in 2007, Keith Collantine of F1 Fanatic wrote that while Premier 1 Grand Prix was "a crude idea at best". some of the suggestions it put forward had merit: the idea of drivers competing against each other in identical machinery later became the focus of both the A1 Grand Prix and Grand Prix Masters. In 2005, the concept of Premier 1 Grand Prix became the Superleague Formula, which started its first race in 2008, however it was folded in 2011.
