= James Walker (racing driver) =

British racing driver

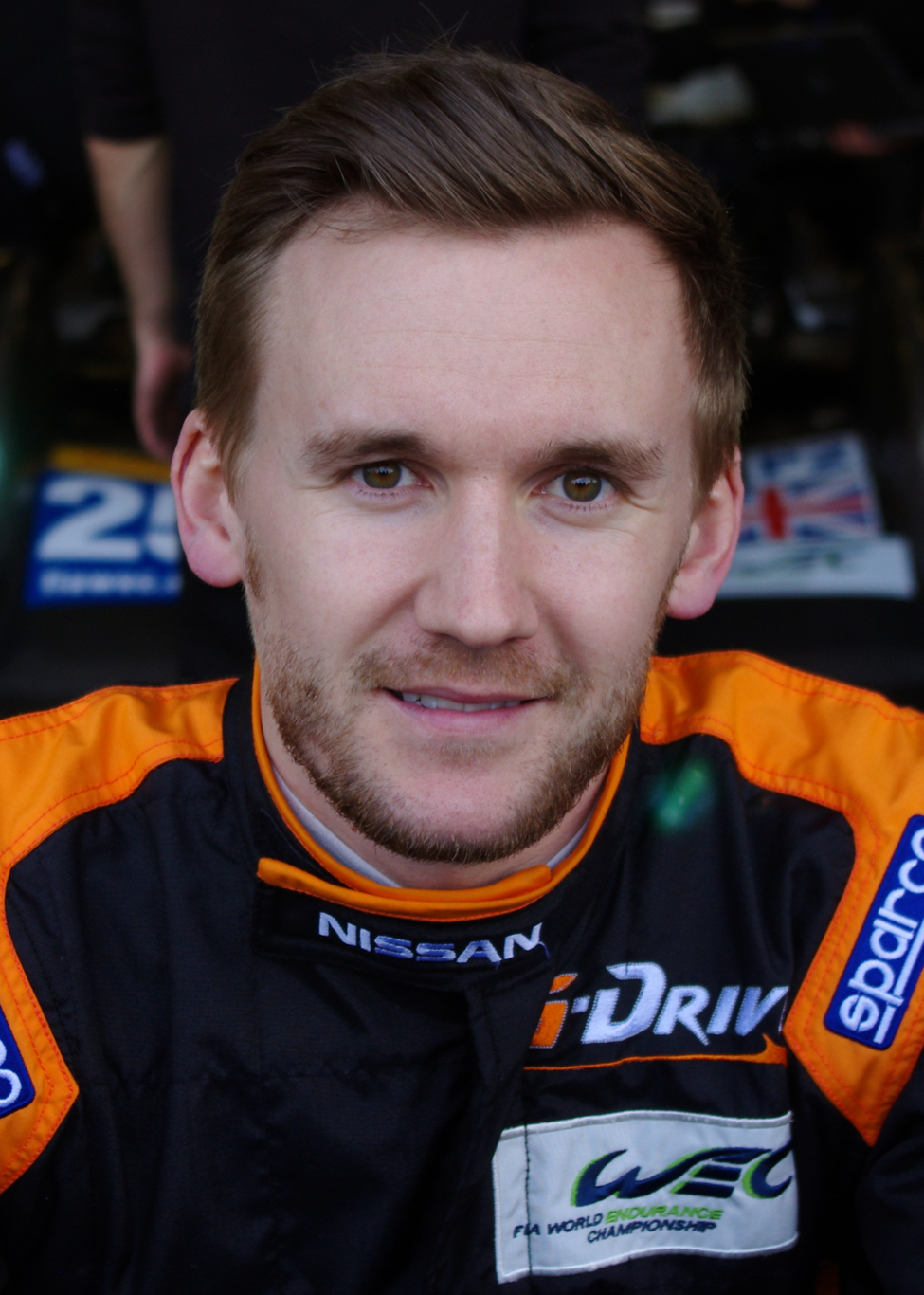
- Walker at the 2013 6 Hours of Silverstone
- Nationality: (United Kingdom) British
- Born: 25 August 1983 (age 43) Jersey (Channel Islands)

Superleague Formula career
- Debut season: 2008
- Current team: Liverpool F.C.
- Categorisation: FIA Gold (until 2020); FIA Silver (2024–2026); FIA Bronze (2027–)
- Car number: 1
- Former teams: Rangers F.C. Borussia Dortmund
- Starts: 4
- Wins: 1
- Poles: 0
- Fastest laps: 0
- Best finish: 13th in 2008

Previous series
- 2007–09 2006 2004–06 2002–03 2002: Formula Renault 3.5 Series; Formula Three Euroseries; British Formula Three; Formula Ford Great Britain; Junior Formula Ford UK

Championship titles
- 2003: FFord GB – S'ship Class

James Walker (born 25 August 1983, in Jersey) is a British professional racing driver.

== Career ==
=== Formula Ford ===
Walker began his single seater racing career in 2002 in the UK Formula Ford championship, finishing the year in 17th place. He also took part in the Avon Tyres Junior Formula Ford series, finishing sixth, and the end-of-season Formula Ford Festival at Brands Hatch, where he finished 12th.

For 2003, Walker stayed in UK Formula Ford, winning the scholarship class for year-old cars as well as taking three overall podium finishes, including a win at Mondello Park. He also finished ninth in the Formula Ford Festival. As a result of his achievements during the season he was nominated for the National Racing Driver of the Year at the annual Autosport Awards.

=== Formula Three ===
The following year, Walker moved up to the British Formula Three Championship, the first of three seasons in the category. Competing for Hitech Racing, he finished his first season in 18th place. He also raced in the one-off Formula 3 European Cup event, finishing 11th, and the Marlboro Masters at Zandvoort, where he finished in 28th place. During the same year, he was also awarded 'Rising Star' status by the British Racing Drivers Club.

In 2005, Walker switched to the Fortec Motorsport team, taking one race win, at the Nürburgring, to finish the year 11th overall. He once again took part in the Marlboro Masters race, but retired from the event. Walker returned to Hitech Racing for the 2006 season, taking three podium places on his way to ninth in the final standings. He also took part in two F3 Euroseries rounds, at Hockenheim and Brands Hatch, but failed to score a point in the four races he entered. Walker also made a third attempt at the renamed BP Ultimate Masters of Formula 3, but once again failed to finish the race.

=== World Series by Renault ===
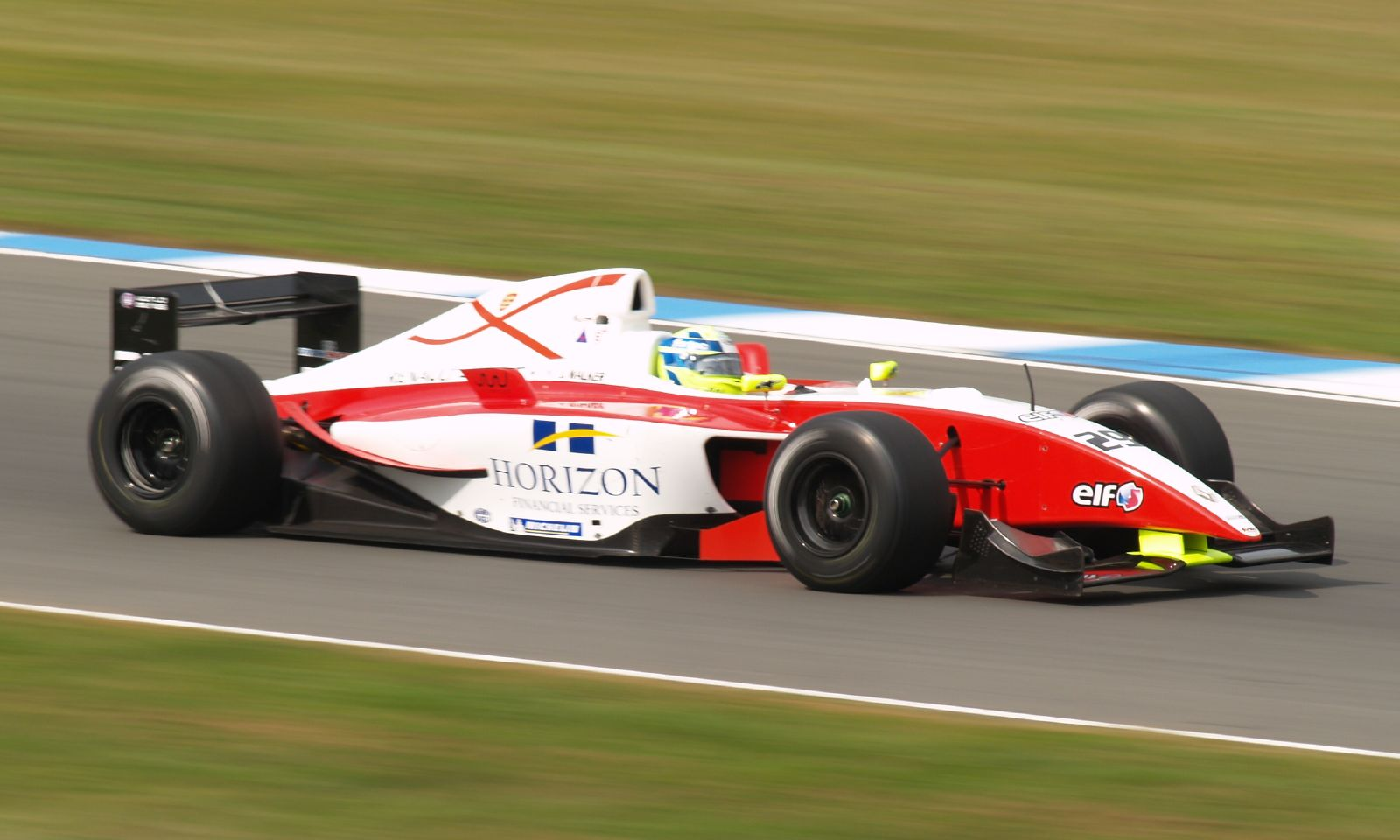
Walker driving for Fortec Motorsport at the Donington Park round of the 2007 World Series by Renault season.

For 2007, Walker made the step up to the World Series by Renault with Fortec Motorsport, who were also making their debut in the series. He finished his maiden year 19th in the final standings, with the highlight being a win in front of his home crowd at Donington Park.

Despite testing for Red Devil Team Comtec during the off-season, Walker stayed with Fortec for a second season in 2008. During the year, he finished in the points on nine occasions, taking a single podium in the final race of the season in Barcelona to finish 13th in the championship.

In the off-season, Walker tested for both Ultimate Signature and P1 Motorsport before joining the latter for the 2009 season. He ended up fifth in the championship, winning a single race at Spa-Francorchamps.

=== Superleague Formula ===
In 2008, Walker also took part in four races of the inaugural Superleague Formula season. He raced for Rangers F.C. at the Nürburgring and then for Borussia Dortmund at Jerez, where he won the final race of the season. He would return to the series in 2010, driving for defending champions Liverpool, replacing Adrián Vallés.

=== Sports car racing ===
Walker was given a drive a Porsche for J Lowe Racing in the 2010 24 Hours of Daytona, but the car retired before he got behind the wheel.

Walker joined Le Mans Series team JMW Motorsport for the 2011 season. He and Rob Bell got two class wins out of five races driving a Ferrari 458 Italia, resulting runners-up in the GTE-Pro drivers and teams championships. In 2012, he won the Paul Ricard race for JMW together with Jonny Cocker, and retired at the 24 Hours of Le Mans.

Walker switched to Delta-ADR for the 2013 season of the FIA World Endurance Championship. Driving an Oreca-Nissan, he got a LMP2 class win, a fourth-place finish and a fifth, resulting sixth in the teams standings.

== Racing record ==
=== Career summary ===
Season	Series	Team	Races	Wins	Poles	F/Laps	Podiums	Points	Position
2002	UK Formula Ford Championship	?	?	?	?	?	?	50	17th
2002	Avon Tyres Junior Formula Ford Championship	?	?	?	?	?	?	182	6th
2003	UK Formula Ford Championship - Scholarship Class	?	?	?	?	?	?	466	**1st**
2004	British Formula Three Championship	Hitech Racing	24	0	0	0	0	20	18th
2005	British Formula Three Championship	Fortec Motorsport	22	1	0	1	1	69	11th
2006	British Formula Three Championship	Hitech Racing	21	0	0	0	3	92	9th
2006	Formula Three Euroseries	Hitech Racing	4	0	0	0	0	0	NC
2007	Formula Renault 3.5 Series	Fortec Motorsport	17	1	0	0	1	19	19th
2008	Formula Renault 3.5 Series	Fortec Motorsport	17	0	0	0	1	36	13th
2009	Formula Renault 3.5 Series	P1 Motorsport	17	1	0	2	3	89	5th
2010	Superleague Formula	Liverpool FC	16	0	0	0	0	439	10th
2011	Rolex Sports Car Series - GT	Bullet Racing	1	0	0	0	0	16	57th
2011	Le Mans Series - LM GTE Pro	JMW Motorsport	5	2	0	0	2	46	**2nd**
2012	European Le Mans Series - LM GTE Pro	JMW Motorsport	1	1	0	0	1	26	**2nd**
2012	German Volkswagen Scirocco R-Cup		1	0	0	0	0	0	NC
2013	British GT Championship - GT3	Fortec Motorsport	2	0	0	0	0	8	24th
2013	FIA World Endurance Championship - LMP2	Delta-ADR	5	1	1	0	1	44	7th
2014	United SportsCar Championship - GTD	Fall-Line Motorsports	1	0	0	0	0	1	134th
2014	European Le Mans Series - LMP2	Greaves Motorsport	1	0	0	0	0	8	21st
2014	European Le Mans Series - GTE	JMW Motorsport	1	0	0	0	1	15	19th
2024	Le Mans Cup - GT3	Steller Motorsport							
2025-26	24H Series Middle East - TCX	asBest Racing							

=== Complete Formula Renault 3.5 Series results ===
(key) (Races in bold indicate pole position) (Races in italics indicate fastest lap)

Year	Entrant	1	2	3	4	5	6	7	8	9	10	11	12	13	14	15	16	17	DC	Points
2007	Fortec Motorsport	MNZ; 1 Ret	MNZ; 2; 14	NÜR; 1; 24	NÜR; 2; 18	MON; 1; 14	HUN; 1; 12	HUN; 2; 10	SPA; 1; 20	SPA; 2 Ret	DON; 1; 10	DON; 2; 1	MAG; 1 Ret	MAG; 2; 18	EST; 1; 7	EST; 2; 20	CAT; 1; 15	CAT; 2; 10	19th	19
2008	Fortec Motorsport	MNZ; 1; 7	MNZ; 2; 7	SPA; 1 Ret	SPA; 2; 16	MON; 1; 8	SIL; 1; 10	SIL; 2; 12	HUN; 1; 7	HUN; 2; 10	NÜR; 1 Ret	NÜR; 2; 13	BUG; 1 Ret	BUG; 2; 9	EST; 1 Ret	EST; 2; 14	CAT; 1; 7	CAT; 2; 2	13th	36
2009	P1 Motorsport	CAT; 1; 6	CAT; 2 Ret	SPA; 1 Ret	SPA; 2; 1	MON; 1; 3	HUN; 1; 4	HUN; 2 Ret	SIL; 1; 4	SIL; 2; 2	BUG; 1 Ret	BUG; 2; 9	ALG; 1; 6	ALG; 2; 8	NÜR; 1 Ret	NÜR; 2; 4	ALC; 1; 18	ALC; 2; 9	5th	89

=== Superleague Formula ===
==== 2008 ====
(Races in bold indicate pole position) (Races in italics indicate fastest lap)

Year	Team	Operator	1	2		3	4	5	6		Position	Points
2008	Rangers F.C.	Alan Docking Racing	DON	NÜR		ZOL	EST	VAL			13th	227
2008	Rangers F.C.	Alan Docking Racing		4	12						13th	227
2008	Borussia Dortmund	Zakspeed							JER		14th	218
2008	Borussia Dortmund	Zakspeed							14	1	14th	218

==== 2010 ====
Year	Team	Operator	1			2			3			4			5			6			7			8	9	10	11	Position	Points
2010	Liverpool F.C.	Atech	SIL			ASS			MAG			JAR			NÜR			ZOL			BRH			ADR	POR	ORD	NAV	10th	439
2010	Liverpool F.C.	Atech	16	**17**	X	6	6	4	6	8	5	16	4	X	6	18	X	6	13	X	10	10	X					10th	439

=== 24 Hours of Le Mans results ===
Year	Team	Co-Drivers	Car	Class	Laps	Pos.	Class Pos.
2012	(United Kingdom) JMW Motorsport	(United Kingdom) Jonny Cocker (New Zealand) Roger Wills	Ferrari 458 Italia GTC	GTE; Pro	204	DNF	DNF
