= John Martin (Australian racing driver) =

Australian racing driver

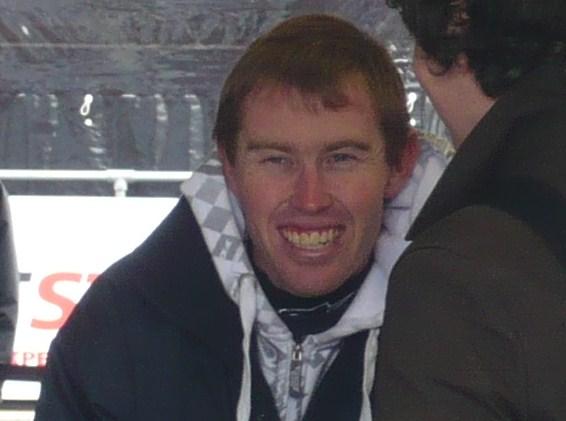
- Martin in 2010
- Nationality: (Australia) Australian
- Born: 8 July 1984 (age 42) Gosford, New South Wales

FIA World Endurance Championship career
- Debut season: 2012
- Current team: ADR-Delta
- Categorisation: FIA Gold (until 2012, 2019–); FIA Platinum (2013–2018)
- Car number: 25

Previous series
- 2009 2009 2007–08 2007–08 2005–06 2006 2005 2005: Formula Renault 3.5 Series; Superleague Formula; British F3; A1 Grand Prix; Formula Ford Australia; Formula Ford UK; Formula Ford NSW, Australia; Formula Ford Victoria, Australia

Championship titles
- 2011 2006 2005: Superleague Formula; Formula Ford Australia; Formula Ford Victoria, Australia

John Martin is an Australian professional racing driver. Martin has had wide experience racing in European based open-wheel series since 2006. In that time Martin has had a wide experience of open-wheel racing having driven in various national and international series driving Formula Ford, Formula 3, A1 Grand Prix and Formula Renault 3.5. For the past two seasons, Martin has raced for several teams in the football inspired series Superleague Formula. Martin has long been associated with the British Alan Docking Racing team having raced with them in a variety of formulae for four of the five years he has been racing in Europe. In 2012 Martin will again race with ADR, racing an Oreca 03 sports car in the LMP2 class of the FIA World Endurance Championship.

== Career ==
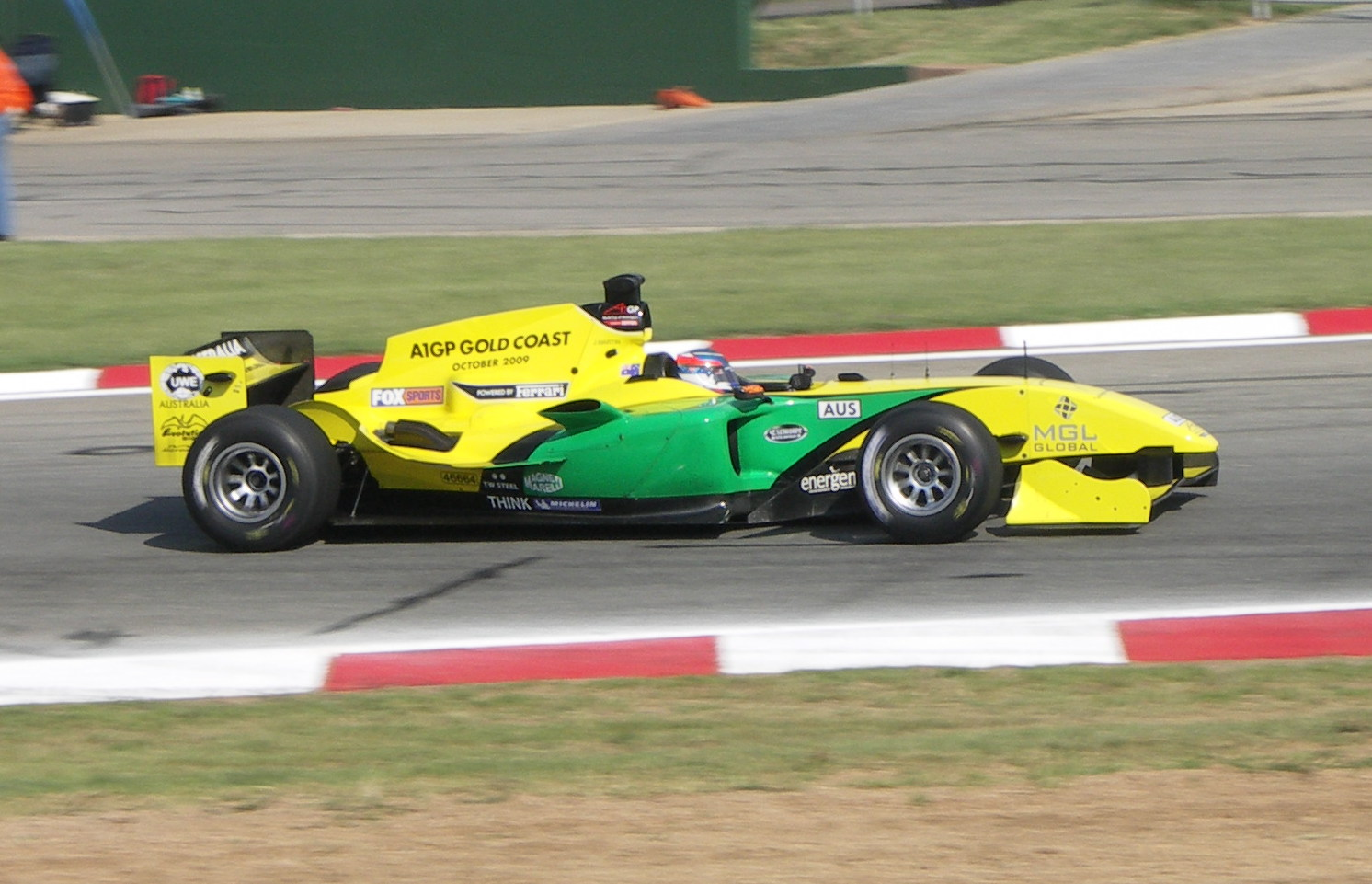
Martin competing for A1 Team Australia at the 2008–09 A1 Grand Prix of Nations, South Africa.

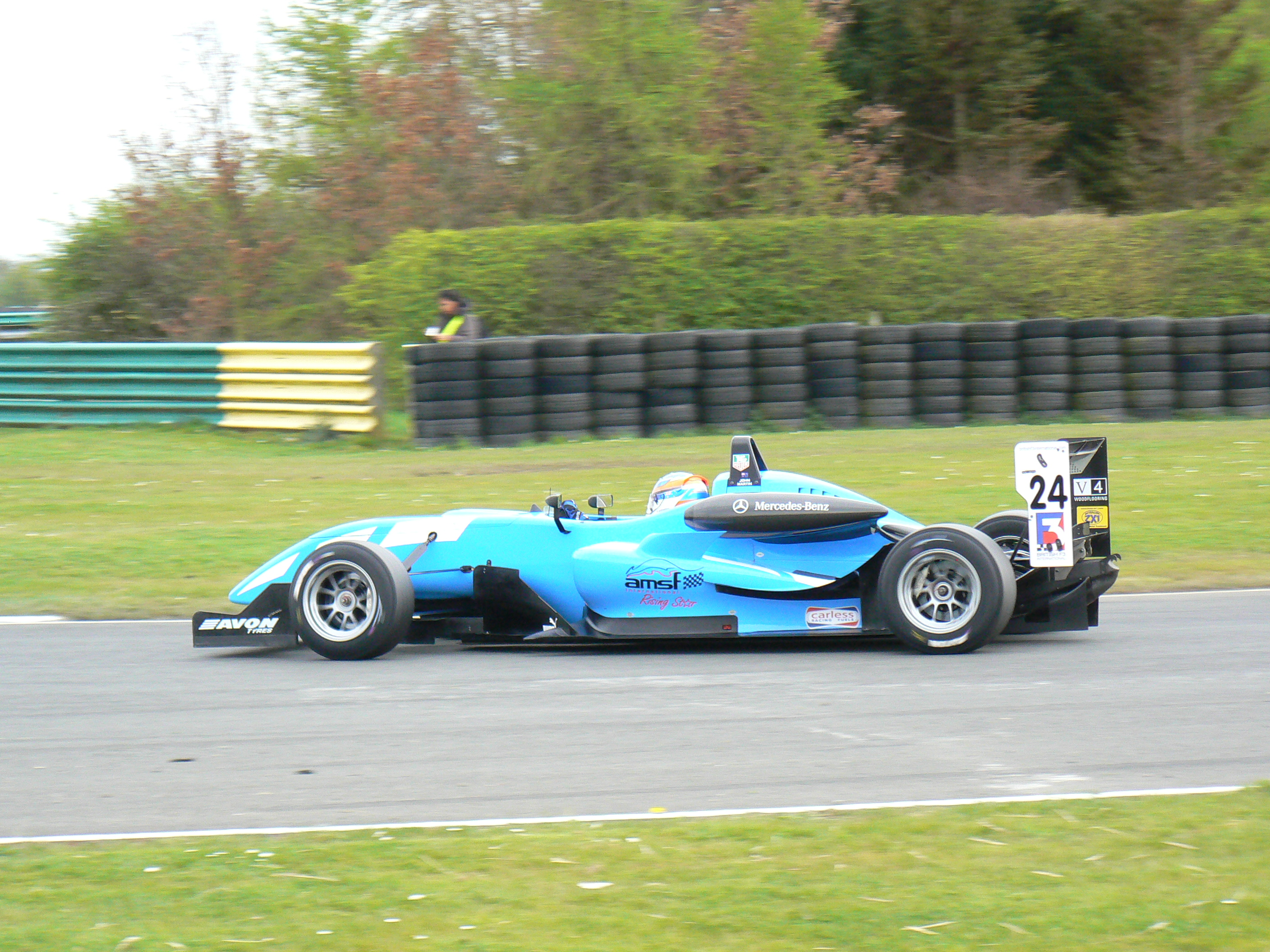
Martin driving for Räikkönen Robertson Racing at the Croft round of the 2008 British Formula 3 season.

=== Karting ===
- 2004: Pole and 2nd at Australian Resa nationals; 2nd in Queensland, Australian Rotax light; 2nd in Queensland, Australian clubman heavy and 4th in senior national heavy
- 2003: Geelong Ford Kartstars championships, Australia
- 2002: 1st in Resa Queensland state championship
- 2001: 5th in Resa nationals

=== Formulas ===
Martin finished 28th in the 2007 Masters of Formula 3. He joined A1 Team Australia and drove in the A1 Grand Prix series during the 2007–08 season, and continued to race for the team in 2008–09. Martin drove the Rangers F.C. car in the 2009 Superleague Formula season for one win from thirteen races. In 2010, he started the Superleague Formula season with Atlético Madrid before ending the season with Beijing Guoan, starting twenty nine races for six wins and twenty top-tens.

== Racing record ==
=== Career summary ===
Season	Series	Team	Races	Wins	Poles	F/Laps	Points	Position
2005	Australian Formula Ford Championship	GK Martin P/L	6	2	1	?	71	10th
2005	New South Wales Formula Ford Championship	Borland Racing Developments	18	11	?	?	418	**2nd**
2005	Victorian Formula Ford Championship	Borland Racing Developments	15	6	5	?	425	**1st**
2006	Australian Formula Ford Championship	CAMS Rising Star	23	8	?	?	300	**1st**
2006	British Formula Ford Championship	Alan Docking Racing	8	1	2	?	?	?
2007	British Formula 3 Championship	Alan Docking Racing	22	0	0	0	16	15th
2007–08	A1 Grand Prix	A1 Team Australia	12	0	0	0	18‡	17th‡
2008	British Formula 3 Championship	Räikkönen Robertson Racing	22	0	0	1	45	13th
2008–09	A1 Grand Prix	A1 Team Australia	14	0	0	0	36‡	8th‡
2009	Formula Renault 3.5 Series	Comtec Racing	7	0	0	0	8	22nd
2009	Superleague Formula	Rangers F.C.	12	0	0	0	241‡	10th‡
2009	Australian Mini Challenge	BMW Group Australia	2	0	0	1	48	36th
2010	Superleague Formula	Beijing Guoan	26	6	2	0	453‡	9th‡
2010	Superleague Formula	Atlético Madrid	3	0	0	0	265‡	17th‡
2011	Superleague Formula	Australia	6	2	0	2	158‡	**1st ‡**
2012	World Endurance Championship	ADR-Delta	8	0	0	0	26	17th
2013	World Endurance Championship	G-Drive Racing	8	0	0	0	53	17th
2013	FIA World Endurance Championship - LMP2	G-Drive Racing	8	4	3	0	132	**3rd**
2014	United Sports Car Championship - Prototype	Action Express Racing	1	0	0	0	31	43rd
2014	United Sports Car Championship - Prototype Challenge	Starworks Motorsport	5	0	0	0	57	25th
2015	Australian Carrera Cup Championship	Copyworld	14	0	0	0	282	16th
2016	Australian Endurance Championship	Walkinshaw GT3	2	0	0	0	364	5th
2017	Australian Endurance Championship	Walkinshaw GT3	4	0	0	1	480	**3rd**
2017	Intercontinental GT Challenge	Walkinshaw GT3	1	0	0	0	0	NC†
2018	Australian GT Championship	Walkinshaw GT3	6	0	0	1	698	10th
2019	TCR Australia Touring Car Series	Wall Racing	20	1	0	0	380	8th
2021	TCR Australia Touring Car Series	Wall Racing	15	0	0	0	402	5th
2021	S5000 Tasman Series	AGI Sport with GRM	3	0	0	0	21	13th
2022	S5000 Australian Drivers' Championship	Versa Motorsport	3	0	0	0	64	13th
2024	TCR Australia Touring Car Series	Wall Racing	3	0	0	0	83	14th

† - Guest driver, ineligible for points.

‡ - Team standings.

=== Complete A1 Grand Prix results ===
(key) (Races in bold indicate pole position) (Races in italics indicate fastest lap)

Year	Entrant	1	2	3	4	5	6	7	8	9	10	11	12	13	14	15	16	17	18	19	20	DC	Points
2007–08	Australia	NED; SPR	NED; FEA	CZE; SPR; PO	CZE; FEA; PO	MYS; SPR; PO	MYS; FEA; PO	CHN; SPR; PO	CHN; FEA; PO	NZL; SPR; 9	NZL; FEA; Ret	AUS; SPR; 6	AUS; FEA; 5	RSA; SPR; 6	RSA; FEA; 14	MEX; SPR; Ret	MEX; FEA; 21	CHN; SPR; 15	CHN; FEA; 14	GBR; SPR; 14	GBR; FEA; Ret	17th	20
2008–09	Australia	NED; SPR; 12	NED; FEA; 4	CHN; SPR; 11	CHN; FEA; 6	MYS; SPR; 8	MYS; FEA; 4	NZL; SPR; Ret	NZL; FEA; 4	RSA; SPR; 12	RSA; FEA; 13	POR; SPR; 10	POR; FEA; 12	GBR; SPR; 7	GBR; FEA; 8							8th	36

=== Complete Formula Renault 3.5 Series results ===
(key) (Races in bold indicate pole position) (Races in italics indicate fastest lap)

Year	Team	1	2	3	4	5	6	7	8	9	10	11	12	13	14	15	16	17	Pos	Points
2009	Comtec Racing	CAT; SPR	CAT; FEA	SPA; SPR	SPA; FEA	MON; FEA; 12	HUN; SPR; 20	HUN; FEA; 13	SIL; SPR; 21	SIL; FEA; 20	BUG; SPR	BUG; FEA	ALG; SPR	ALG; FEA	NÜR; SPR; 7	NÜR; FEA; 8	ALC; SPR	ALC; FEA	22nd	8

=== Complete Superleague Formula results ===
(key) (Races in bold indicate pole position) (Races in italics indicate fastest lap)

Year	Operator	Team	1			2			3			4			5			6			7			8			9			10			11			12			Position	Points
2009	Alan Docking Racing	Rangers F.C.	MAG			ZOL			DON			EST			MOZ			JAR																					10th	241
2009	Alan Docking Racing	Rangers F.C.	17	16	X	2	15	C	2	16	**1**	5	8	X	11	12	C	10	9	X																			10th	241
2010	Alan Docking Racing	Atlético Madrid	SIL			ASS			MAG			JAR			NÜR			ZOL			BRH			ADR			POR			ORD			BEI †			NAV			17th	265
2010	Alan Docking Racing	Atlético Madrid	10	3	6																																		17th	265
2010	Alan Docking Racing	Beijing Guoan				10	17	X	4	10	X	**1**	9	2	18	**15**	X	13	7	X	1	16	1	2	9	4	**1**	11	3	19	**DN**	X	11	6	C	1	6	**1**	9th	453
2011	Alan Docking Racing	Australia	HOL			BEL																																	**1st**	**158**
2011	Alan Docking Racing	Australia	6	2	4	7	1	2																															**1st**	**158**

† Non Championship round

=== Complete FIA World Endurance Championship results ===
Year	Entrant	Class	Car	Engine	1	2	3	4	5	6	7	8	Rank	Points
2012	ADR-Delta	LMP2	Oreca 03	Nissan VK45DE 4.5 L V8	SEB; 9	**SPA**; 7	**LMS**; 11	SIL; 8	SÃO; 12	BHR; 20	FUJ; 8	SHA; 7	17th	26
2013	G-Drive Racing	LMP2	Oreca 03	Nissan VK45DE 4.5 L V8	SIL; 6	SPA; 4	LMS; EX	**SÃO**; 1	**COA**; 1	FUJ; 2	**SHA**; 1	BHR; 1	3rd	132

=== 24 Hours of Le Mans results ===
Year	Team	Co-drivers	Car	Class	Laps	Pos.	Class pos.
2012	(United Kingdom) ADR-Delta	(Thailand) Tor Graves (Czech Republic) Jan Charouz	Oreca 03-Nissan	LMP2	346	13th	6th
2013	(Russia) G-Drive Racing	(Russia) Roman Rusinov (United Kingdom) Mike Conway	Oreca 03-Nissan	LMP2	327	EX	EX

=== Complete 24 Hours of Daytona results ===
Year	Team	Co-drivers	Car	Class	Laps	Pos.	Class pos.
2014	(United States) Action Express Racing	(United States) Brian Frisselle (United States) Burt Frisselle (France) Fabien Giroix	Chevrolet Corvette DP	P	695	**3rd**	**3rd**

=== Complete Bathurst 12 Hour results ===
Year	Team	Co-drivers	Car	Class	Laps	Pos.	Class pos.
2017	(Australia) Walkinshaw GT3	(Australia) Liam Talbot (Australia) Duvashen Padayachee	Porsche 911 GT3 R	AAM	289	4th	**1st**
2018	(Australia) Nineteen Corp P/L	(Australia) Mark Griffith (Australia) David Reynolds (Australia) Liam Talbot	Mercedes-AMG GT3	APA	266	15th	9th

=== Complete TCR Australia results ===
Year	Team	Car	1	2	3	4	5	6	7	8	9	10	11	12	13	14	15	16	17	18	19	20	21	Position	Points
2019	Wall Racing	Honda Civic Type R TCR (FK8)	SMP; R1; 6	SMP; R2; 6	SMP; R3; Ret	PHI; R4; 13	PHI; R5; 14	PHI; R6; Ret	BEN; R7; 3	BEN; R8; 4	BEN; R9; 1	QLD; R10; 15	QLD; R11; 7	QLD; R12; 6	WIN; R13; 14	WIN; R14; 8	WIN; R15; 6	SAN; R16; 5	SAN; R17; Ret	SAN; R18; DNS	BEN; R19; 6	BEN; R20; 11	BEN; R21; 6	8th	397
2021	Wall Racing	Honda Civic Type R TCR (FK8)	SYM; R1; 17	SYM; R2; 14	SYM; R3; 13	PHI; R4; 4	PHI; R5; 3	PHI; R6; 4	BAT; R7; 6	BAT; R8; 5	BAT; R9; 5	SMP; R10; 11	SMP; R11; 20	SMP; R12; 12	BAT; R19; 7	BAT; R20; 7	BAT; R21; 9							5th	402
2024	Wall Racing	Honda Civic Type R TCR (FL5)	SAN; R1; 10	SAN; R2; 5	SAN; R3; 11	SYM; R4	SYM; R5	SYM; R6	PHI; R7	PHI; R8	PHI; R9	BND; R10	BND; R11	BND; R12	QLD; R13	QLD; R14	QLD; R15	SMP; R19	SMP; R20	SMP; R21	BAT; R22	BAT; R23	BAT; R24	14th	83

=== Complete S5000 results ===
Year	Series	Team	1	2	3	4	5	6	7	8	9	10	11	12	13	14	15	Position	Points
2019	Exhibition	AGI Sport	SAN; R1; **2**	SAN; R2; 3	SAN; R2; 3	BMP; R1; 3	BMP; R2; 3	BMP; R2; 1										N/C	-
2021	Tasman	AGI Sport	SMP; R1	SMP; R2	SMP; R3	BAT; R4; Ret	BAT; R5; 7	BAT; R6; 8	BAT; R7; C									13th	21
2022	Australian	Versa Motorsport	SYM; R1	SYM; R2	SYM; R3	PHI; R4	PHI; R5	PHI; R6	MEL; R7	MEL; R8	MEL; R9	SMP; R10	SMP; R11	SMP; R12	HID; R13; 5	HID; R14; 5	HID; R15; 6	13th	64

Sporting positions
Preceded by Daniel Elliott	Australian Formula Ford Championship champion 2006	Succeeded by Tim Blanchard
Preceded by Davide Rigon (R.S.C. Anderlecht)	Superleague Formula champion (Australia); 2011	Succeeded by Incumbent
