= Sporting CP (Superleague Formula team) =

Sporting CP SF Racing Team
Founded	2009
Country	Portugal
Driver(s)	Pedro Petiz (2009); Borja García (2010); Andy Soucek (2010); Máximo Cortés (2010); Adrián Vallés (2010)
First race	2009 Magny-Cours
Last race	2010 Navarra
Rounds	17
Ch'ships	0
Total points	544 (including Super Finals)
2010 position	15th (329 pts)
Races / Poles / Wins / Podiums / F. Laps; 34 / 0 / 1 / 3 / 0
NOTE - Data not including Super Finals

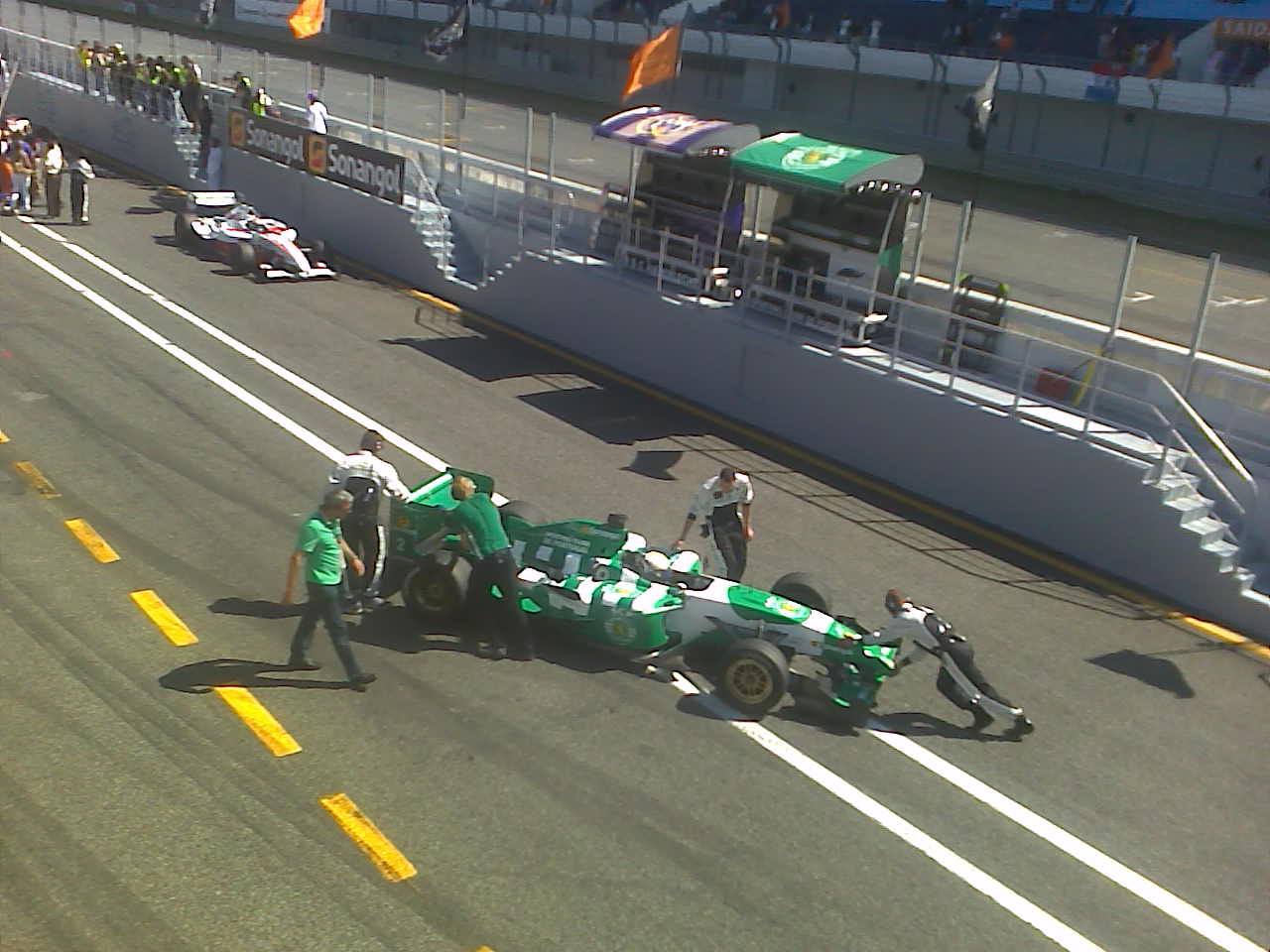
Sporting CP car in the Estoril pitlane, 2009

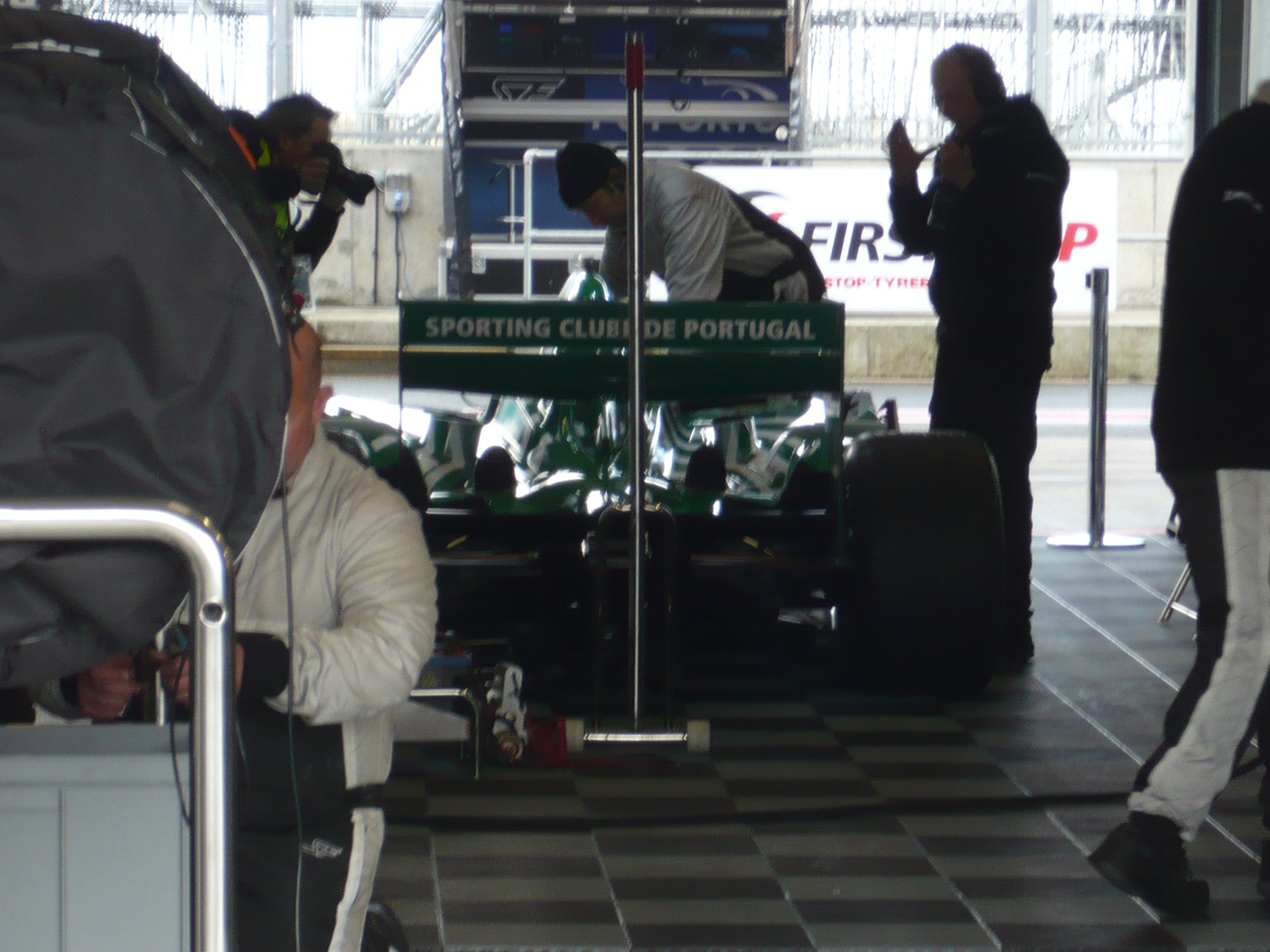
Sporting CP car in the pitlane garage at Silverstone Circuit (2010)

Sporting Clube de Portugal Superleague Formula team is the racing team of Sporting Clube de Portugal, a football team that competes in Portugal in the Portuguese Liga. The Sporting Clube de Portugal racing team competed in the Superleague Formula. It made its debut in the 2009 season and was operated by motorsport team Zakspeed, who have also participated in Formula One.

== 2009 season ==
Pedro Petiz was the driver of the Sporting Clube de Portugal entry. The highlight of Sporting's season happened at the Monza round where they won their first race.

== Record ==
(key)

=== 2009 ===
- Super Final results in 2009 did not count for points towards the main championship.

Operator(s)	Driver(s)	1			2			3			4			5			6			Points	Rank
Operator(s)	Driver(s)	MAG			ZOL			DON			EST			MOZ			JAR			Points	Rank
Zakspeed	(Portugal) Pedro Petiz	7	17	X	16	13	–	12	2	6	9	17	X	18	1	–	13	13	X	215	12th

=== 2010 ===
Operator(s)	Driver(s)	1			2			3			4			5			6			7			8	9			10			NC			11			Points	Rank
Operator(s)	Driver(s)	SIL			ASS			MAG			JAR			NÜR			ZOL			BRH			ADR	POR			ORD			BEI			NAV			Points	Rank
Atech GP/Reid Motorsport	(Spain) Borja García	7	11	X	18	5	X	11	5	X	18	13	X	12	7	X																				329	15th
Atech GP/Reid Motorsport	(Spain) Andy Soucek																9	6	X	3	15	X														329	15th
Drivex	(Spain) Máximo Cortés																							15	15	X										329	15th
EmiliodeVillota Motorsport	(Spain) Adrián Vallés																										16	5	X	5	9	C	10	17	X	329	15th
