= Alan Docking Racing =

British motor racing team

(United Kingdom) Alan Docking Racing
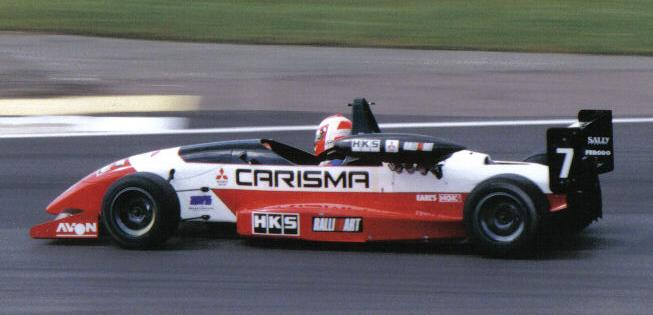
- Founded: 1975
- Folded: 2013
- Team principal(s): Alan Docking
- Former series: Formula 2 Macau Formula 3 Grand Prix; British F3; A1 Grand Prix; British Formula Ford; Superleague Formula; FIA World Endurance Championship
- Teams' Championships: 2011 Superleague Formula
- Drivers' Championships: 1976 British F3 (Keegan); 1977 British F3 (South); 2002 British F3 (Kerr)

Alan Docking Racing (ADR) is a motor racing team based in Silverstone, United Kingdom. The team was formed in 1975 by Australian Alan Docking.

The team competed in the British Formula 3 series throughout most of its existence; however, it has also graduated to A1 Grand Prix and Superleague Formula and has also competed in sports and saloon cars at a national and international level. The team ran also as Alan Docking Racing Finland.

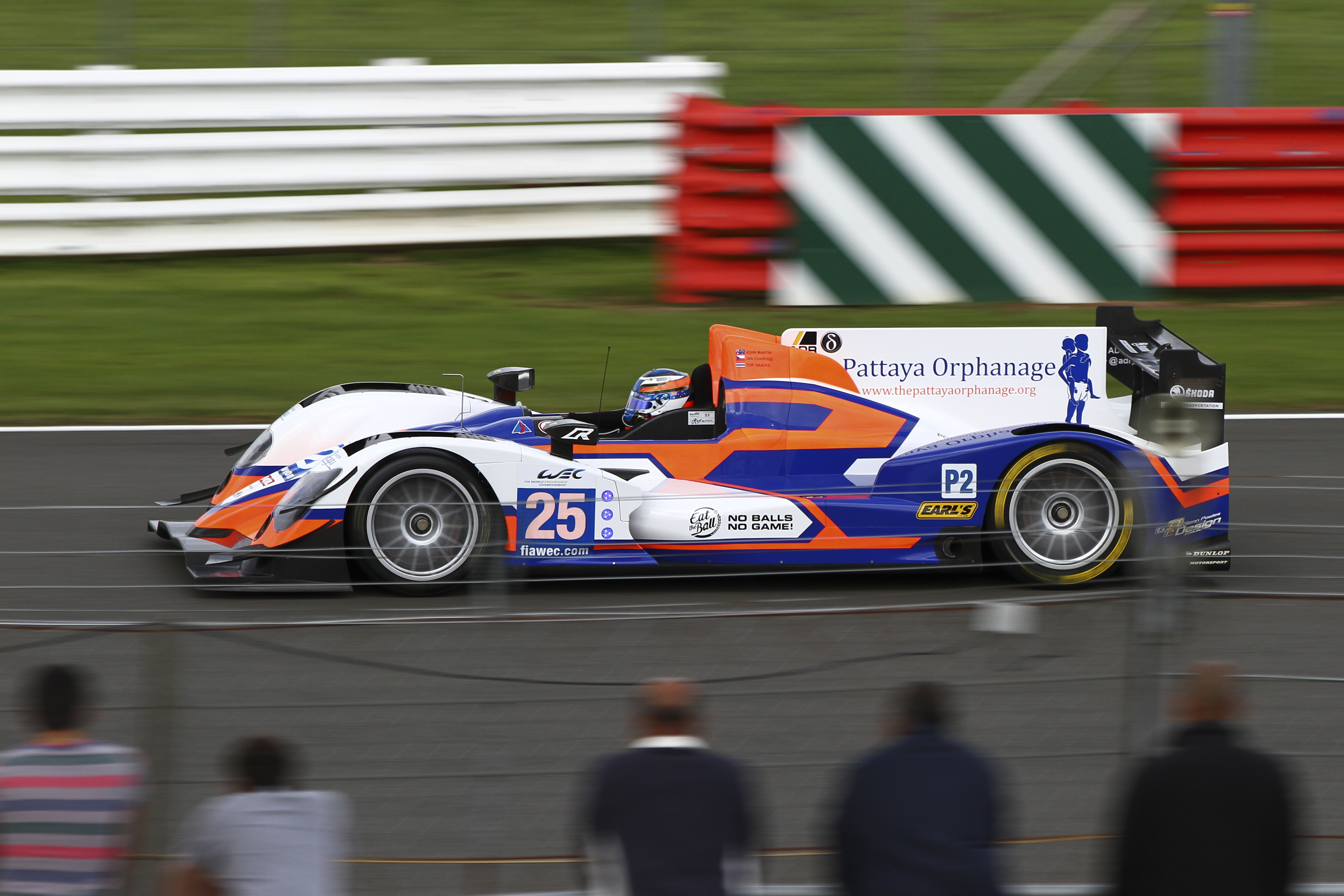
John Martin in the ADR-Delta Oreca 03-Nissan at the 2012 6 Hours of Silverstone

Currently, the team runs in the FIA World Endurance Championship as Delta-ADR, in a joint venture with engineering company Delta Motorsport (with one car branded as G-Drive Racing).

== History ==
With team creation, ADR ran in British F3 winning in a row the 1976 and 1977 championships with Rupert Keegan and Stephen South, respectively. In 1978, it competed in the European Formula Two Championship, with drivers including Stefan Johansson.

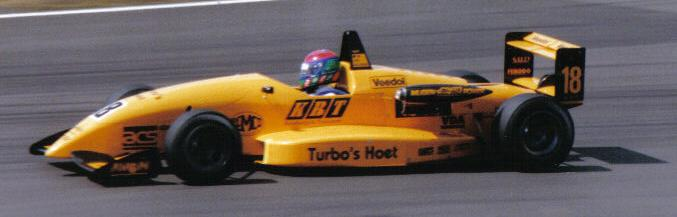
Kurt Mollekens racing for ADR in the 1995 British F3 season.

ADR join the British Formula Ford Championship in 1987 and 1988 with Mazda. The team returned to British F3 in 1989 and has entered several notable drivers including Mika Salo, Hideki Noda, Ricardo Rosset, Mark Webber and Marcos Ambrose.

In 2002 the team won their third British F3 title with Robbie Kerr, and in 2005–06 the team collaborates with A1 Team Australia in the new A1 Grand Prix championship.

== Racing record ==
=== European Formula Two ===
(key) (Results in bold indicate pole position; results in italics indicate fastest lap.)

Year	Chassis	Engine(s)	Drivers	1	2	3	4	5	6	7	8	9	10	11	12	13
1979	Chevron B48	Hart		SIL	HOC	THR	NÜR	VAL	MUG	PAU	HOC	ZAN	PER	MIS	DON	
1979	Chevron B48	Hart	(Netherlands) Huub Rothengatter	8	Ret	6	5	Ret	Ret	DNQ	Ret	12	8	Ret	13	
1980	Toleman TG280	Hart		THR	HOC	NÜR	VAL	PAU	SIL	ZOL	MUG	ZAN	PER	MIS	HOC	
1980	Toleman TG280	Hart	(Netherlands) Huub Rothengatter	6	5	6	7	Ret	5	1	Ret	7	4	4	13	
1980	Toleman TG280	Hart	(Italy) Siegfried Stohr			4	5	2	18	3	6	Ret	**1**	13	3	
1981	Lola T850; Toleman TG280	Hart		SIL	HOC	THR	NÜR	VAL	MUG	PAU	PER	SPA	DON	MIS	MAN	
1981	Lola T850; Toleman TG280	Hart	(Sweden) Stefan Johansson	9	1	7	4	2	Ret	8	Ret	14	4	9	1	
1981	Lola T850; Toleman TG280	Hart	(United Kingdom) Kenny Acheson	19	Ret	Ret	6	10	15	Ret					3	
1981	Lola T850; Toleman TG280	Hart	(Colombia) Ricardo Londoño							9	Ret	Ret	DNS			
1982	Docking-Spitzley DS1	Hart		SIL	HOC	THR	NÜR	MUG	VAL	PAU	SPA	HOC	DON	MAN	PER	MIS
1982	Docking-Spitzley DS1	Hart	(Belgium) Thierry Tassin	DSQ	6	Ret	**18**	9	Ret	Ret	Ret		Ret			DNQ
1982	Docking-Spitzley DS1	Hart	(Italy) Carlo Rossi	Ret	Ret	Ret	12	Ret	DNQ	DNQ	Ret		13		Ret	12

=== A1 Grand Prix ===
A1 Grand Prix results
Year	Car	Team	Race	Wins	Poles	Fast laps	Points	T.C.
2005–06	Lola A1GP-Zytek	A1 Team Australia	22	0	0	0	51	13th
2006–07	Lola A1GP-Zytek	A1 Team Australia	22	0	0	0	25	13th
2007–08	Lola A1GP-Zytek	A1 Team Australia	20	0	0	0	20	17th
2008–09	A1GP-Ferrari	A1 Team Australia	14	0	0	1	36	8th

- D.C. = Drivers' Championship position, T.C. = Teams' Championship position.

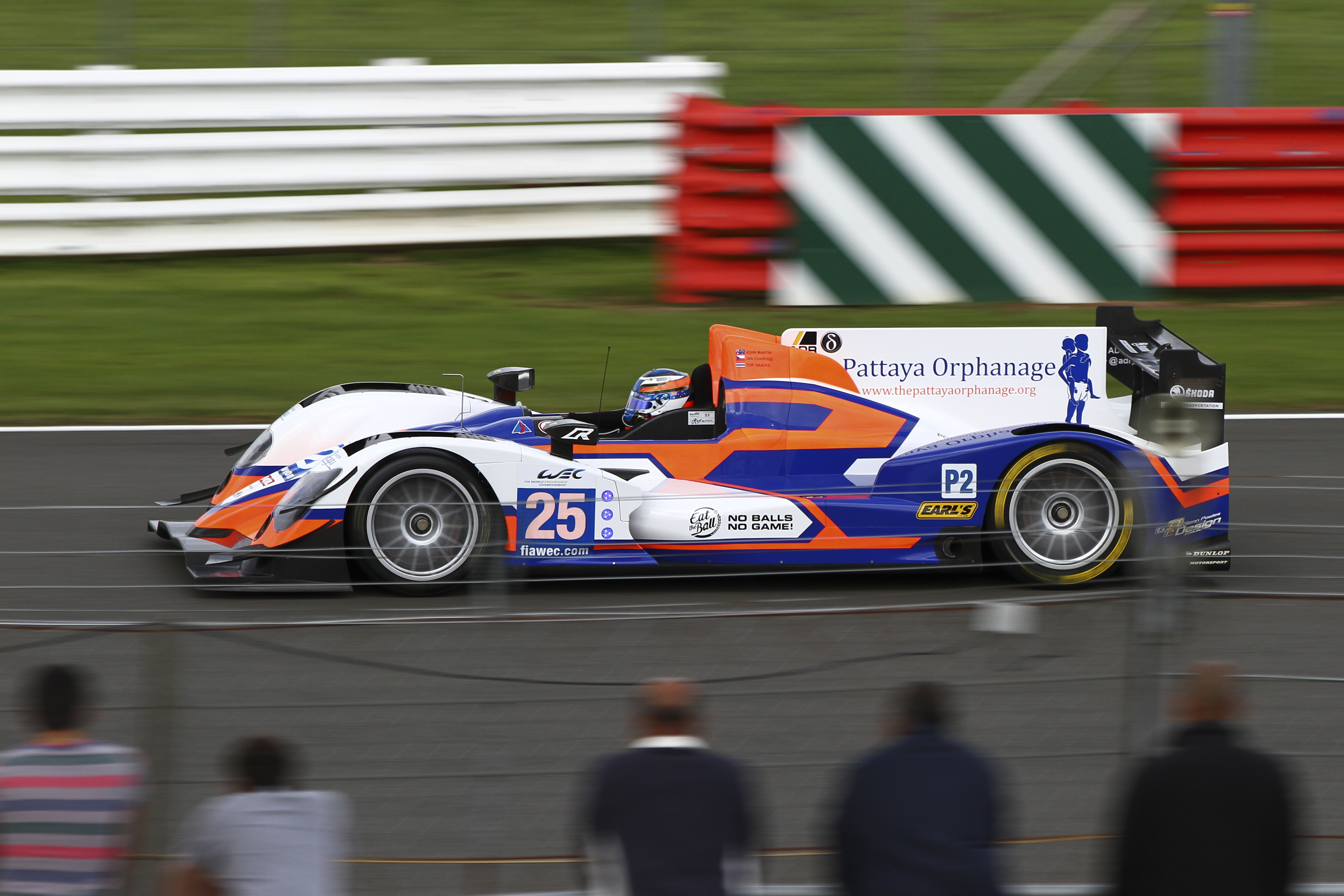
ADR-Delta's LMP2 at Silverstone in 2012.

=== 24 Hours of Le Mans ===
Year	Entrant	No.	Car	Drivers	Class	Laps	Pos.	Class Pos.
2012	(United Kingdom) ADR-Delta	25	Oreca 03-Nissan	(Czech Republic) Jan Charouz (Thailand) Tor Graves (Australia) John Martin	LMP2	346	13th	6th
2013	(United Kingdom) Delta-ADR	25	Oreca 03-Nissan	(Thailand) Tor Graves (United Kingdom) Archie Hamilton (Japan) Shinji Nakano	LMP2	101	DNF	DNF
2013	(Russia) G-Drive Racing	26	Oreca 03-Nissan	(United Kingdom) Mike Conway (Australia) John Martin (Russia) Roman Rusinov	LMP2	327	DSQ	DSQ
