= Superleague Formula =

Single-seater racing championship

- Category: Single seaters
- Country: International
- Inaugural season: 2008
- Folded: 2011
- Drivers: 14
- Teams: 14
- Constructors: Élan Motorsport Technologies
- Tyre suppliers: Michelin
- Last Drivers' champion: (Australia) John Martin
- Last Teams' champion: Australia
- Official website: superleagueformula.com

Superleague Formula was an open wheel single seater formula racing series held from 2008 to 2011. The league introduced team sponsorship by association football clubs, using the slogan The Beautiful Race: Football at 300 km/h. By 2011 the link with football had faded as more than half the teams were no longer associated with football teams. The season ran between April and November at the same time as most other European race series, and unlike the rival A1 Grand Prix. Every team used identical Panoz DP09 racecars with 750-horsepower 4.2-liter V12 engines.

The series was founded by businessmen Alex Andreu and Robin Webb. On 19 May 2010, Andreu stepped down in his role as series president, with Alfredo Brisac named as his successor not many weeks later. The Sonangol Group was the series' title sponsor from June 2009 until the end of the 2010 season.

The future of the championship was in doubt after the cancellation of over three-quarters of 2011 season events. In April 2012, when most European motor racing started, there had been no news or information regarding the possibility of a 2012 or 2013 season running. The website updates ceased in 2011, and no further seasons were organised.

== History ==
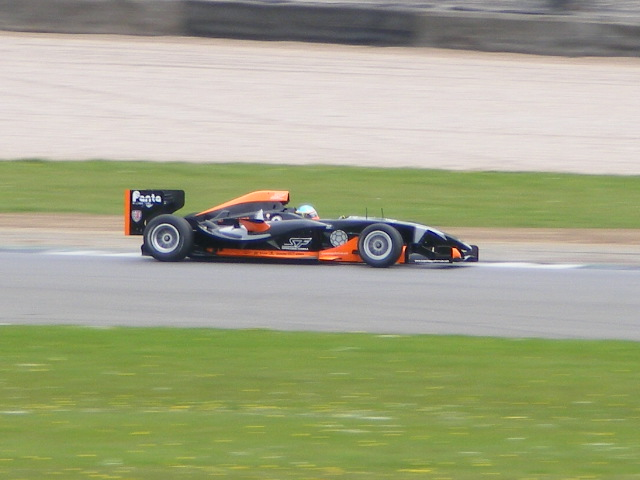
The Superleague Formula prototype car is demonstrated by Andy Soucek at Donington Park in July 2008

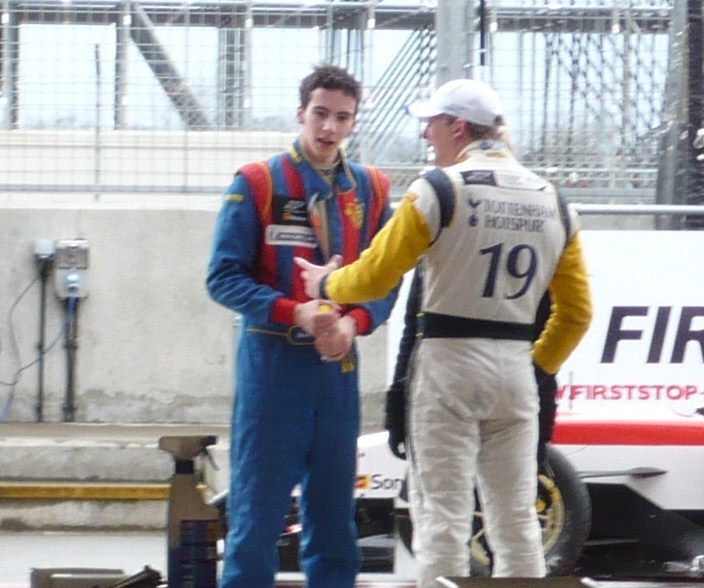
Two of the series' most successful drivers, Max Wissel and Craig Dolby

Continuing the concept of Premier 1 Grand Prix, the Superleague Formula was announced in 2005, receiving the full approval of the FIA in December 2005. The goal was to have a starting grid of twenty teams, each with one car. Much of the sales, marketing and technology work would be handled centrally by the league, thus affording a considerable cost-savings to the teams.

The inaugural season, in 2008, was won by Chinese club Beijing Guoan, driven by Italian FIA GT Championship racer, Davide Rigon. The season consisted of six double-headers, featuring 18 clubs, and also brought victories for Liverpool F.C., A.C. Milan, PSV Eindhoven, F.C. Porto, Sevilla FC, Al Ain and Borussia Dortmund. Superleague Formula's debut race was seen in 62 countries, and 100,000 people watched the twelve races, with 34,000 fans attending the last race in Jerez, broadcast live in 70 countries.

In 2009, the second season was won by English club Liverpool F.C., driven by Spanish racer Adrián Vallés. The season consisted of six double-headers, featuring 19 clubs, and brought first victories for Tottenham Hotspur, FC Basel 1893, Rangers F.C., Olympiacos CFP, Sporting CP, R.S.C. Anderlecht and Galatasaray S.K. This was the first season to feature the Super Final format, adding a six car shootout to four of the six rounds. The races were broadcast in 62 countries to a reach of 100 million people.

2010 was the third season and saw the biggest change yet, with the calendar increased from six to twelve race weekends and another increase to both race event and end-of-season prize money. An average of 18 clubs competed at each event throughout the season. In a pre-season interview, Superleague Formula's Competition Director Robin Webb said,

The new prize fund offers drivers and teams an even greater incentive to top the Superleague Formula table come November. I can't think of anything else in Europe that offers this level of prize money for the winners, not to mention for individual races as in the Super Final's case. All in all, the series really does now offer drivers the chance to earn a living from motor sport, something that's not possible in single seater racing outside of Formula 1.

After its biggest growth in 2010, 2011 saw a significant contraction with just six football clubs continuing their association into the series fourth season. The remaining cars carried national identities with many more closely associated with the competing drivers rather than any football connection. While an ambitious calendar was announced, several races were cancelled and relocated and as late as September organisers were still seeking to confirm some of its late season races, leaving doubt as to whether the series would have more than half the races of the 2010 season.

After the cancellation of the 2011 Chinese rounds, there were no news reports on the 2012 season. With many drivers and teams having joined other series, as well as no updates from the Superleague Formula website, the series was discontinued after just four seasons of racing.

=== Champions ===
Season	Champion	Second	Third	Ref
2008	(China) Beijing Guoan (Davide Rigon)	(Netherlands) PSV Eindhoven (Yelmer Buurman)	(Italy) A.C. Milan (Robert Doornbos)	
2009	(England) Liverpool F.C. (Adrián Vallés)	(England) Tottenham Hotspur (Craig Dolby)	(Switzerland) FC Basel 1893 (Max Wissel)	
2010	(Belgium) R.S.C. Anderlecht (Davide Rigon)	(England) Tottenham Hotspur (Craig Dolby)	(Switzerland) FC Basel 1893 (Max Wissel)	
2011	Australia (John Martin)	Japan (Duncan Tappy/Robert Doornbos)	Luxembourg (Frédéric Vervisch)	

== Race format ==
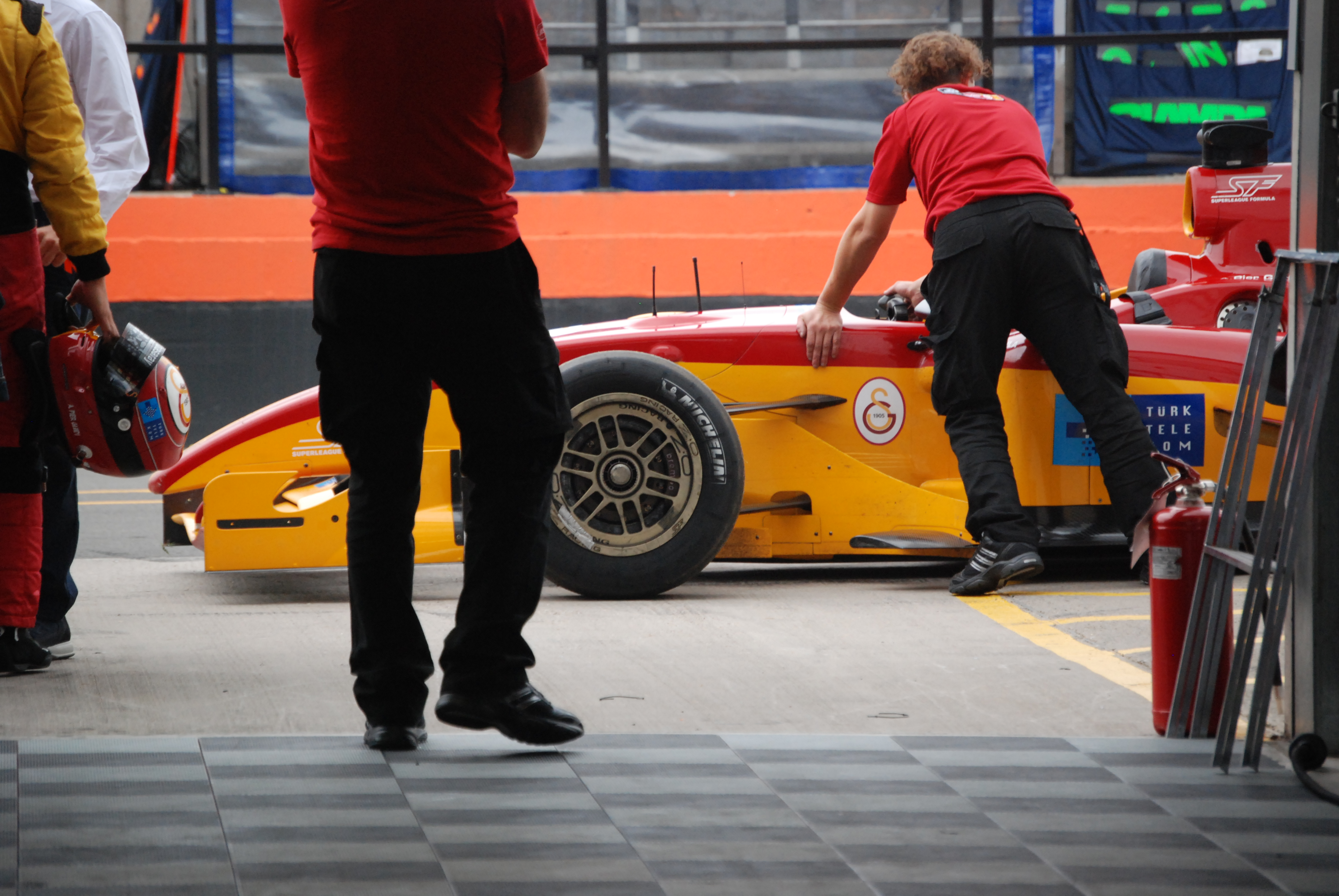
The Galatasaray S.K. Superleague Formula car in the pitlane, 2008

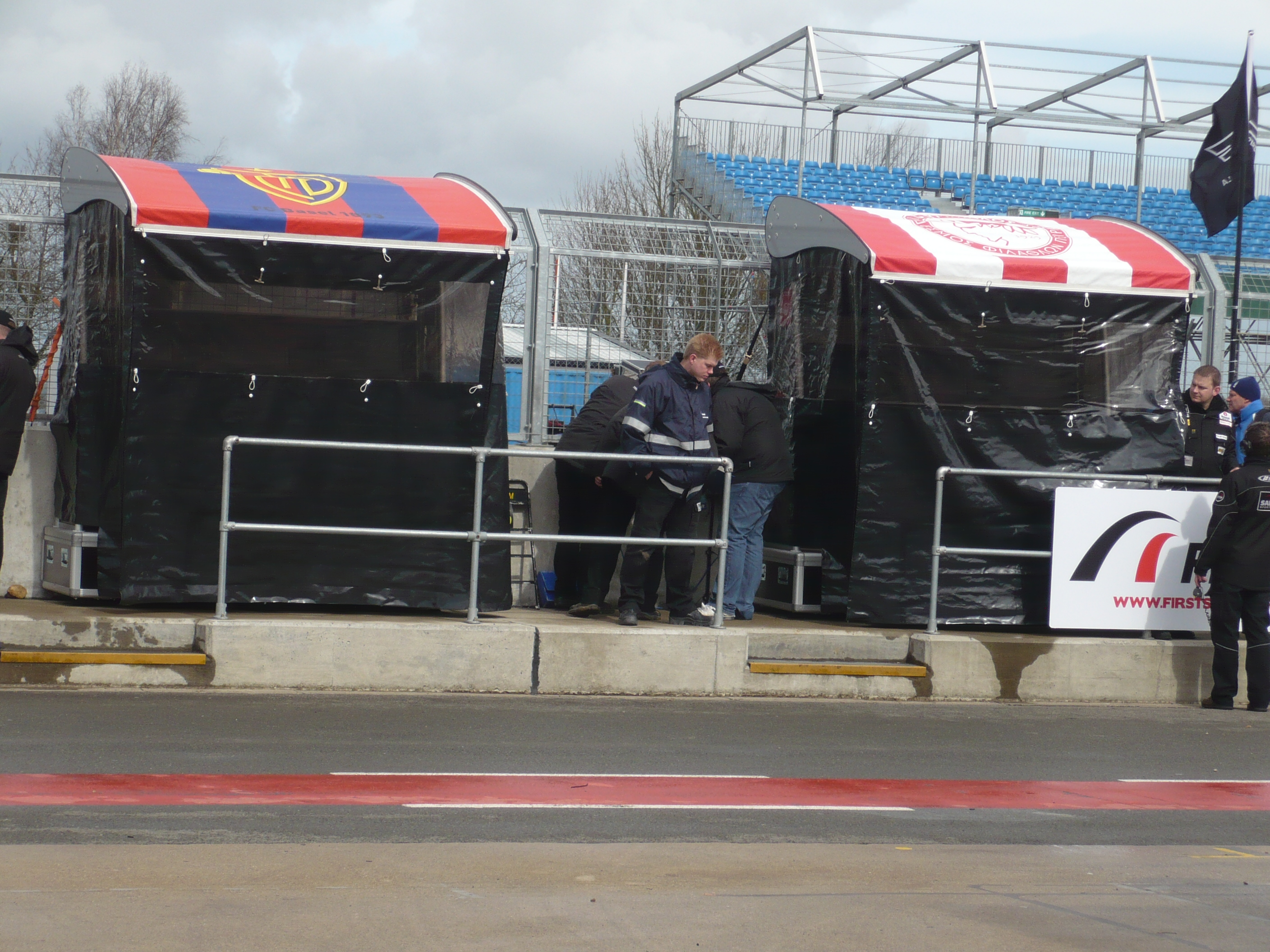
The pit wall of the GU-Racing team at Silverstone Circuit during its 2010 round

Superleague Formula's race format incorporated a Saturday qualification and races on Sunday, one with a reverse grid. For each round, the competing teams competed for prize money, plus points in a yearly championship.

=== 2008 ===
- Saturday: 45-minute free practice session, qualifying and rookie session.
- Sunday: Two 45-minute races (one with reverse grid).
- €1 million prize money per race weekend.

=== New in 2009 ===
- Saturday: Two 45-minute free practice sessions, 1 hour rookie session and qualifying.
- Sunday: Two '44-minute plus a lap' races (the latter with reverse grid).
- Compulsory pit stop in Races 1 and 2 which must be made between laps 8 and 20. Both races feature a rolling start.
- A third, 5 lap 'Super Final' race in 4 of the 6 events in which the weekend's top six cars/drivers, found based on their combined points scores from the first two races, race to decide a 'Weekend Winner' and the distribution of prize money. This race begins with a standing start.
- €333,000 prize money to share per race weekend, including €5,000 for Race 1 pole position and €3,000, €2,000 and €1,000 for the three podium positions in the first two races as well as overall weekend prize money for the top 20 cars by performance, the most one club can get per weekend is €111,000.

=== New in 2010 ===
- Race and qualifying format was largely unchanged from the 2009 season, although practice sessions moved to Friday.
- There was a 'Super Final' race at the end of all twelve events instead of just at select weekends, and which counted for points.
- The series offered the biggest prize fund in European motorsport with the end-of-season champions set to earn €1 million in prize money. €500,000 went to second place and €250,000 to the third place entry. Over €5 million in total was on offer throughout 2010, with €100,000 going to the 'Weekend Winner' of each of the twelve rounds. It was therefore possible for an entry to earn up to €2.2 million over the course of the season.
- Drivers had to finish a race, not only start, in order to score points.

=== Qualifying ===
Superleague Formula employed a unique qualifying system based on a group stage to knock-out format used in some football tournaments:

- There was a draw on the Friday to split cars in Group A and Group B
- No refueling or tyre changing could take place during the qualifying
- Each group in turn had a 15-minute (2008–2009)/10-minute (2010) session to try to be in the fastest four in that group
- Five slowest from the group of the fastest driver went 9th, 11th, 13th, 15th, 17th on the grid
- Five slowest from the other group went 10th, 12th, 14th, 16th, 18th on the grid
- Quarter Final 1: first from fastest group versus fourth from slowest: single flying lap: loser went 8th on the grid
- Quarter Final 2: first from slowest group versus fourth from fastest: single flying lap: loser went 7th on the grid
- Quarter Final 3: second from fastest group versus third from slowest: single flying lap: loser went 6th on the grid
- Quarter Final 4: second from slowest group versus third from fastest: single flying lap: loser went 5th on the grid
- Semi Final 1: winner from quarter final 1 versus winner from quarter final 4: single flying lap: loser goes 4th on the grid
- Semi Final 2: winner from quarter final 2 versus winner from quarter final 3: single flying lap: loser went 3rd on the grid
- Final: single flying lap: loser went 2nd on the grid, winner got pole position

=== Scoring system ===
The championship was decided by points, which were awarded according to the position in which a driver classifies at the end of each race, of which there were three per race weekend. The points were allocated as follows:

Race 1 and 2 points

Position	1st	2nd	3rd	4th	5th	6th	7th	8th	9th	10th	11th	12th	13th	14th	15th	16th	17th	18th	19th	20th	21st	22nd	DNF	DNS
Points	50	45	40	36	32	29	26	23	20	18	16	14	12	10	8	7	6	5	4	3	2	1	0	0

Super Final points (since 2010)

Position	1st	2nd	3rd	4th	5th	6th	DNQ	DNS
Points	6	5	4	3	2	1	0	0

For the first two seasons the driver did not need to finish the race in order to collect points, but did have to start. However, in 2010 a driver needs to start and finish the race in order to score. The same points are awarded for Race 1 as Race 2, despite Race 2 having a reverse grid with the slowest given the advantage at the front. In 2009 began the running of a third race, a 'Super Final', at the end of certain weekends, however no points were awarded this race. As a result, the maximum number of points any football club/driver could score in one round during 2008 or 2009 was 100, by winning both main races. This feat wasn't achieved although Sébastien Bourdais, Craig Dolby, Robert Doornbos and Max Wissel all scored 90 points in a weekend by finishing either 2nd and 2nd or 1st and 3rd.

In 2010 however, with the Super Final also counting for points and 6 points going to the winner, the maximum points haul was now 106, achieved by winning all three races during the weekend. The record was 92 points, held by Craig Dolby from the 2010 Silverstone Superleague Formula round.

== Competitors ==
=== Entrants ===
Each Superleague Formula car represented a football club or national team.

Twenty-three football clubs and ten country-represented cars started at least one race in Superleague Formula:

Americas

- (Brazil) CR Flamengo
- (Brazil) SC Corinthians
- **Team Brazil**

Asia / Oceania

- (United Arab Emirates) Al Ain
- (China) Beijing Guoan
- **Team Australia**
- Team China
- **Team Japan**
- **Team New Zealand**
- **Team South Korea**

Europe

- (Italy) A.C. Milan
- (Czech Republic) **AC Sparta Prague**
- (Italy) A.S. Roma
- (Spain) **Atlético Madrid**
- (Germany) Borussia Dortmund
- (Switzerland) FC Basel 1893
- (Denmark) FC Midtjylland
- (Portugal) F.C. Porto
- (Turkey) **Galatasaray S.K.**
- (France) **GD Bordeaux**
- (England) Liverpool F.C.
- (Greece) Olympiacos CFP
- (France) Olympique Lyonnais
- (Netherlands) **PSV Eindhoven**
- (Scotland) Rangers F.C.
- (Belgium) **R.S.C. Anderlecht**
- (Spain) Sevilla FC
- (Portugal) Sporting CP
- **Team England**
- **Team Luxembourg**
- Team Netherlands
- **Team Russia**
- (England) Tottenham Hotspur

Note: bold represents an active entry in the 2011 season

=== Notable drivers ===
Drivers who have also raced in Formula One

- (Brazil) Enrique Bernoldi (F1 in 2001–2002)
- (France) Sébastien Bourdais (2008–2009)
- (Netherlands) Robert Doornbos (2005–2006)
- (India) Narain Karthikeyan (2005, 2011–2012)
- (France) Franck Montagny (2006)
- (Italy) Giorgio Pantano (2004)
- (Brazil) Antônio Pizzonia (2003–2005)

Drivers who have also raced in the IndyCar Series

- (Russia) Mikhail Aleshin (2014, 2016–2017)
- (Belgium) Bertrand Baguette (2010–2011)
- (Brazil) Enrique Bernoldi (2008)
- (France) Sébastien Bourdais (2005, 2011–2021)
- (Netherlands) Robert Doornbos (2009)
- (United Kingdom) Ben Hanley (2019–2020)
- (France) Franck Montagny (2008–2009, 2014)
- (Italy) Giorgio Pantano (2005, 2011–2012)
- (France) Franck Perera (2008)
- (France) Nelson Philippe (2008–2009)
- (Brazil) Antônio Pizzonia (2008)
- (China) Ho-Pin Tung (2011)

== Circuits ==
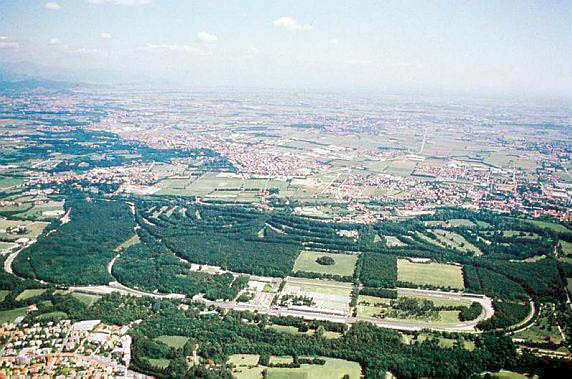
Italy's Autodromo Nazionale Monza hosted a Superleague Formula round during 2009

All of the circuits were existing racetracks except for the Beijing International Street Circuit which was constructed for this competition. Most of the rounds were held in Europe, although rounds were held in China. In total, 21 different circuits from 8 countries have hosted a race weekend. The first to do so was Donington Park, where the first races, at its 2008 round, were held. Only Circuit Zolder hosted races in every season of the competition.

In July 2010, it was announced that the series would race for the first time outside of Europe by having two events in two successive weekends in China on 3 & 10 October that same year. Robin Webb described the venture as "a significant moment in the championship's history".

== Media ==
Snapshot from the official Superleague Formula live World Feed

Fans globally were able to view the championship on national TV channels or via live streaming from the Superleague Formula website. Video highlights of every race from every weekend were also available for streaming from their website.

== Expansion plans ==
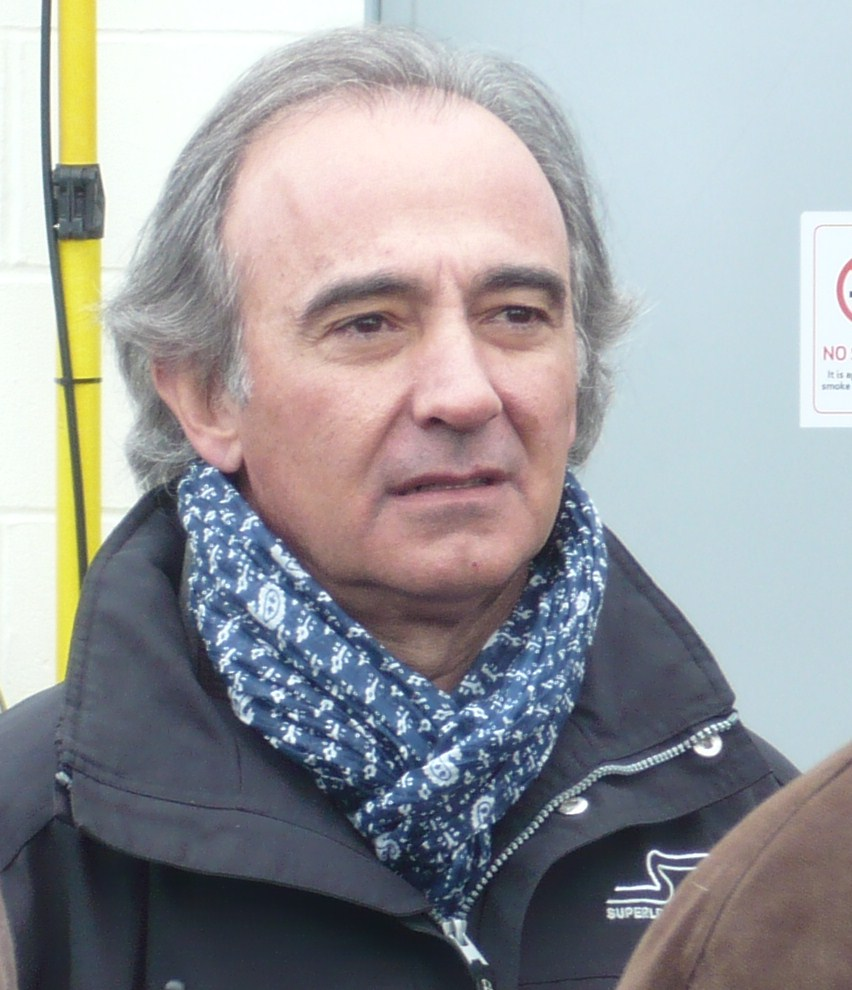
Superleague Formula co-founder and former president, Alex Andreu

In June 2009, Robin Webb stated he wanted the formula to eventually increase to 26 cars and a more diverse range of circuits. He expected the formula to attract more big global clubs and was keen to promote the idea that "Superleague Formula combines the passion of football with the thrill of auto racing".

== Racecar ==
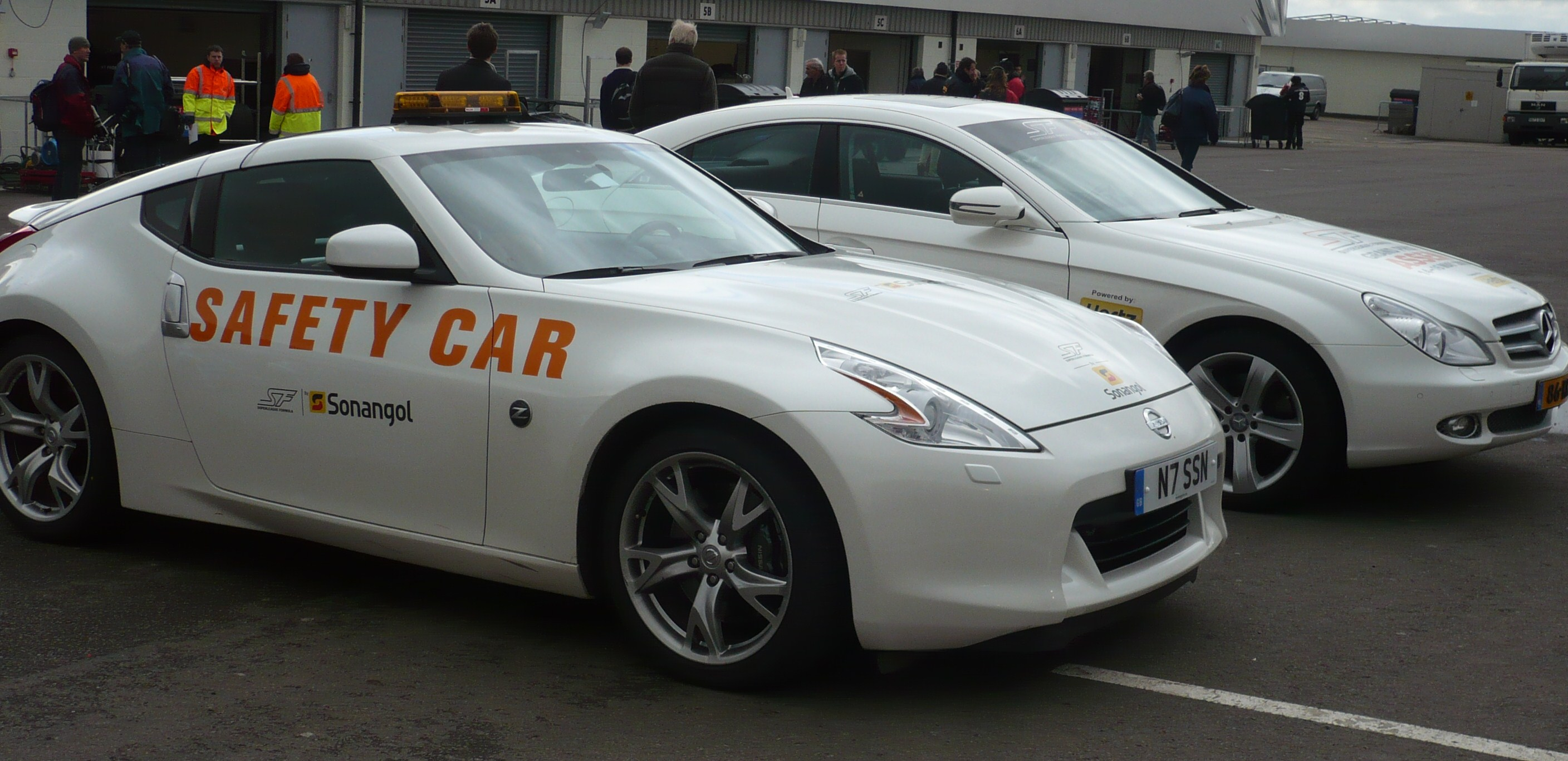
Two Superleague Formula safety cars in the paddock for the 2010 round at Silverstone Circuit

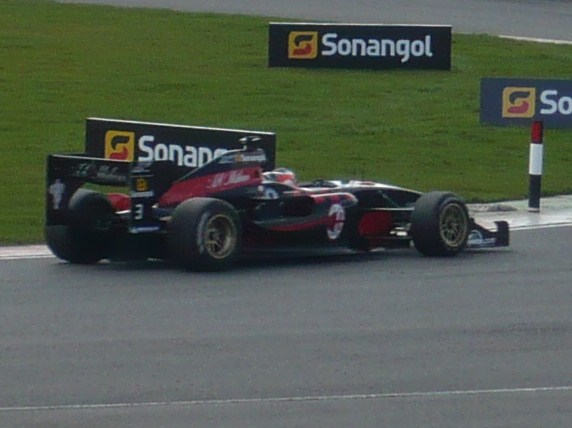
A.C. Milan car on track at Silverstone Circuit (2010)

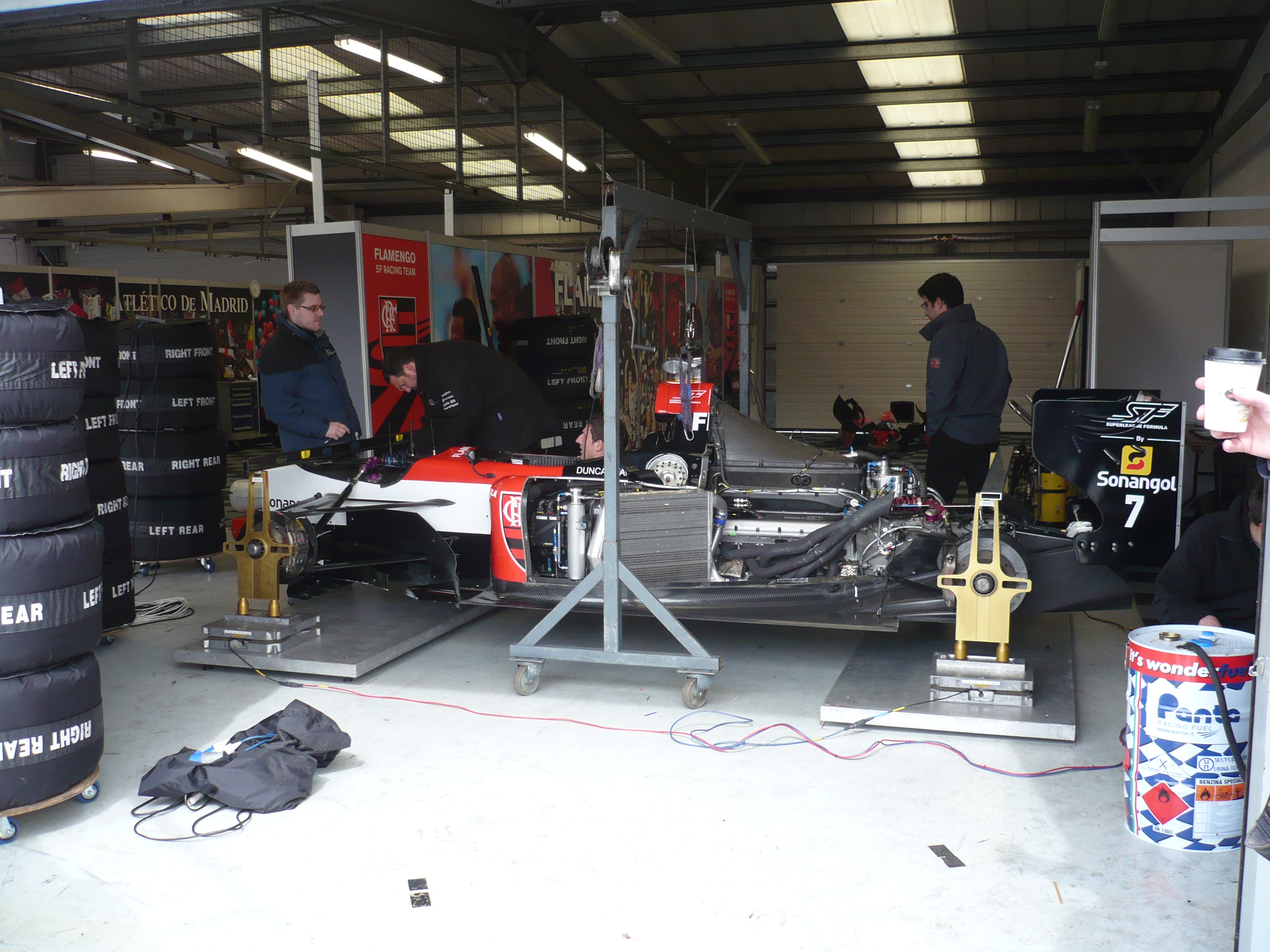
The interior is visible of CR Flamengo's car in its pitlane garage at Silverstone Circuit, 2010

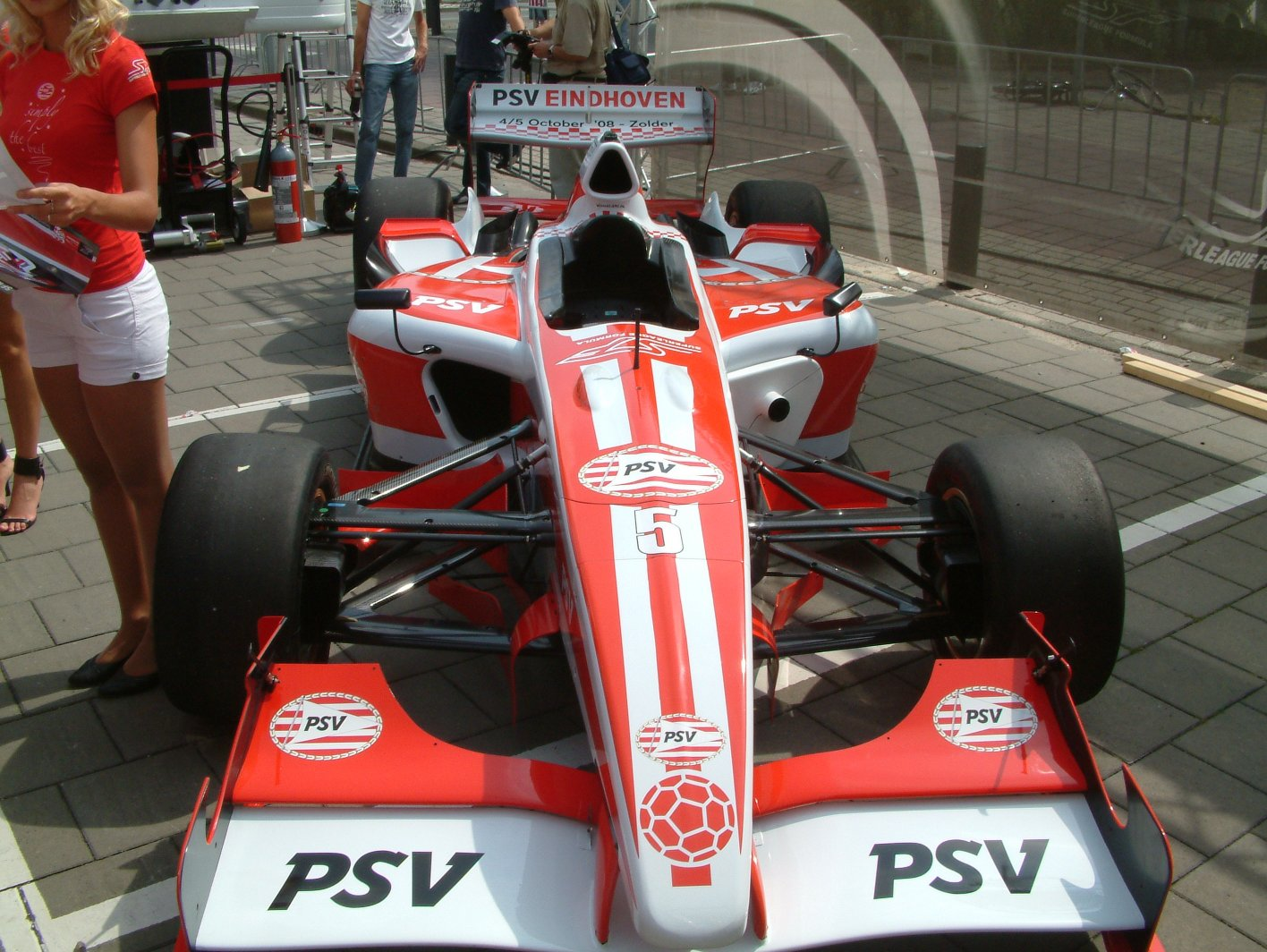
The PSV Eindhoven car is unveiled, 2008

Superleague Formula at Brands Hatch 2010

The cars were built by Panoz Auto Development under the Élan Motorsport Technologies banner and officially named the Panoz DP09. They are powered by 750 bhp, 4.2 litre, V12 engines designed by US-owned Menard Competition Technologies. The cars complied with the same safety standards as 2008 Formula One cars. Élan previously manufactured the Panoz DP01 for the Champ Car series, as well as cars for other championships.

The chassis was built with a two-metre wide track, using under-body aerodynamics to create the needed conditions for increased overtaking opportunities. The cars were subjected to the lengthy FIA safety tests during development stages in 2007.

=== Car details ===
- Carbon fibre tub for extreme strength/lightness
- Under-body aerodynamics to facilitate nose-to-tail driving/overtaking
- Hewland 6 speed LSFA sequential gearbox with Hewland semi-automatic system
- Pi "SIGMA" based dashboard / data logging system
- 'Slick' racing style tyres with no grooves or tread
- Weight Target: 750 kg
- Wheels supplied by OZ Racing and tyres by Michelin
- Brembo brakes
- Pi Research electronics

=== Engine details ===
- No of Cylinders: 12
- Capacity: 4.2 litres
- Configuration: 60 degrees V formation
- Weight: 140 kg (310 lb) Dry
- Peak Power: 750 bhp (560 kW) @ 11,750 rpm
- Maximum RPM: 12,000
- Peak Torque: 510 N·m (376 ft·lb) @ 9,500–10,500

=== Regulations ===
- The cars were driven without the aid of traction control, launch control or anti-stall, leaving a lot down to the skill of the driver.
- Michelin were the sole tyre supplier in Superleague Formula. Cars were allowed four new sets of tyres throughout a race weekend, lasting practice sessions, qualifying and all the races. Under conditions of rain, there was no limit to how many sets of wet tyres that can be used.
- A new 'Push to Pass' button was fitted to cars for 2010. The idea, previously successful in A1 Grand Prix, gave the car 12,000rpm for a minimum of 15 seconds, 1,000rpm more than the normal rev limit of 11,000rpm. Drivers could use the extra horsepower advantage to attempt to overtake another car. After the 15 seconds, the 'power boost' stopped once the car's revs dropped back to below 9,000rpm. The 'Push to Pass' button could be used a maximum of eight times by a driver during both races. After a period on the 'power boost', the extra power option was unavailable for 120 seconds. The 'Push to Pass' option was not available during practice sessions or qualifying.

=== Performance ===
At Magny-Cours in 2009, the best qualifying time for a Superleague Formula car was 1:26.391, almost 11.5 seconds slower than the fastest qualifying time for an F1 car in 2008 of 1:15.024. Both Superleague Formula and Formula One raced at Monza in 2009 where similar dry qualifying conditions meant a better time comparison was possible. The fastest F1 time at the 2009 Italian Grand Prix was a 1:22.955, whereas at the 2009 Monza Superleague Formula round, a month later, the fastest SF time was 1:36.444, 13.5 seconds slower. This makes the speed of Superleague Formula car comparable to the World Series by Renault cars.

On 14 January 2010, Menard Competition Technologies received a Motorsport Industry Association's award for Technology and Innovation for its "outstanding design and engineering work undertaken on the Superleague V12 racing engine".

== Other ventures ==
A video game for Superleague Formula was made by Media Game and Image Space Incorporated and released for PC on 31 October 2009, although it was originally announced to be released in September. Superleague Formula 2009: The Game, released for download by the series' official website, featured 18 clubs and 6 circuits from in the 2009 season, and both single-player and multiplayer modes. During the 2009 Donington round some star drivers tested out the new game and gave it positive feedback.

== See also ==
- List of Superleague Formula records
- A1 Grand Prix (Same System of Auto Racing format)
