= 2003 World Series by Nissan =

Seasons
- ← 2002 2004 →

The 2003 Telefónica World Series by Nissan was contested over 9 race weekends/18 rounds. In this one-make formula all drivers had to use the Dallara chassis (Dallara SN01) and Nissan engines (Nissan VQ). 11 different teams and 28 different drivers competed.

== Drivers and Teams ==
| Team | No. | Driver | Rounds |
|---|---|---|---|
| (Spain) Racing Engineering | 1 | (France) Stéphane Sarrazin | All |
| (Spain) Racing Engineering | 2 | (Belgium) Bas Leinders | All |
| (Spain) Gabord Competición | 3 | (France) Franck Montagny | All |
| (Spain) Gabord Competición | 4 | (Finland) Heikki Kovalainen | All |
| (Belgium) KTR | 5 | (United States) Paul Edwards | All |
| (Belgium) KTR | 6 | (Spain) Félix Porteiro | All |
| (Spain) Epsilon Euskadi | 7 | (France) Jean-Christophe Ravier | All |
| (Spain) Epsilon Euskadi | 8 | (Spain) Ander Vilariño | All |
| (Spain) Campos Motorsport | 9 | (Spain) Marc Gené | 1-5 |
| (Spain) Campos Motorsport | 9 | (Spain) José Manuel Pérez-Aicart | 6-8 |
| (Spain) Campos Motorsport | 9 | (Spain) Antonio García | 9 |
| (Spain) Campos Motorsport | 10 | (Spain) Santiago Porteiro | All |
| (Spain) Repsol RFS Vergani Racing | 11 | (Mexico) Ricardo Gonzalez | 1-4 |
| (Spain) Repsol RFS Vergani Racing | 12 | (Spain) Ángel Burgueño | All |
| (Austria) Superfund Zele Racing | 14 | (Austria) Norbert Siedler | 1-6 |
| (Austria) Superfund Zele Racing | 14 | (United Kingdom) Guy Smith | 8 |
| (Austria) Superfund Zele Racing | 15 | (Brazil) Tuka Rocha | 1-5 |
| (Italy) RC Motorsport | 18 | (Brazil) Enrique Bernoldi | 1 |
| (Italy) RC Motorsport | 18 | (Brazil) Carlos Pereira | 2-5 |
| (Italy) RC Motorsport | 18 | (Italy) Vitantonio Liuzzi | 6 |
| (Italy) RC Motorsport | 18 | (Austria) Norbert Siedler | 7-8 |
| (Italy) RC Motorsport | 18 | (Italy) Enrico Toccacelo | 9 |
| (Italy) RC Motorsport | 19 | (Spain) Polo Villaamil | All |
| (Italy) GD Racing | 20 | (France) Jonathan Cochet | 1 |
| (Italy) GD Racing | 20 | (Brazil) Enrique Bernoldi | 2-9 |
| (Italy) GD Racing | 21 | (France) Mathieu Zangarelli | 3-4 |
| (Italy) GD Racing | 21 | (Chile) Pablo Donoso | 9 |
| (France) Saulnier Racing | 22 | (France) Didier Andre | All |
| (France) Saulnier Racing | 23 | (France) Bruno Besson | All |
| (United Kingdom) Tata Carlin Motorsport | 24 | (India) Narain Karthikeyan | All |
| (United Kingdom) Tata Carlin Motorsport | 25 | (France) Bruce Jouanny | All |

== Calendar ==
| Round | | Circuit/Location | Date | Pole position | Fastest lap | Winner | Winning team | Report |
|---|---|---|---|---|---|---|---|---|
| 1 | R1 | (Spain) Circuito Permanente Del Jarama | 30 March | (France) Franck Montagny | (France) Franck Montagny | (France) Franck Montagny | (Spain) Gabord Competición | Report |
| 1 | R2 | (Spain) Circuito Permanente Del Jarama | 30 March | (Brazil) Enrique Bernoldi | (France) Franck Montagny | (France) Franck Montagny | (Spain) Gabord Competición | Report |
| 2 | R1 | (Belgium) Circuit Zolder | 27 April | (France) Franck Montagny | (France) Franck Montagny | (Spain) Marc Gené | (Spain) Campos Motorsport | Report |
| 2 | R2 | (Belgium) Circuit Zolder | 27 April | (France) Franck Montagny | (France) Franck Montagny | (France) Franck Montagny | (Spain) Gabord Competición | Report |
| 3 | R1 | (France) Circuit de Nevers Magny-Cours | 18 May | (France) Bruce Jouanny | (France) Franck Montagny | (France) Franck Montagny | (Spain) Gabord Competición | Report |
| 3 | R2 | (France) Circuit de Nevers Magny-Cours | 18 May | (France) Bruno Besson | (France) Franck Montagny | (France) Franck Montagny | (Spain) Gabord Competición | Report |
| 4 | R1 | (Italy) Autodromo Nazionale Monza | 22 June | (France) Stéphane Sarrazin | (France) Stéphane Sarrazin | (France) Franck Montagny | (Spain) Gabord Competición | Report |
| 4 | R2 | (Italy) Autodromo Nazionale Monza | 22 June | (France) Stéphane Sarrazin | (France) Franck Montagny | (France) Stéphane Sarrazin | (Spain) Racing Engineering | Report |
| 5 | R1 | (Germany) Lausitzring | 20 July | (Finland) Heikki Kovalainen | (France) Franck Montagny | (France) Franck Montagny | (Spain) Gabord Competición | Report |
| 5 | R2 | (Germany) Lausitzring | 20 July | (Finland) Heikki Kovalainen | (France) Stéphane Sarrazin | (Finland) Heikki Kovalainen | (Spain) Gabord Competición | Report |
| 6 | R1 | (Austria) A1-Ring, Spielberg, Styria | 21 September | (Belgium) Bas Leinders | (France) Franck Montagny | (Belgium) Bas Leinders | (Spain) Racing Engineering | Report |
| 6 | R2 | (Austria) A1-Ring, Spielberg, Styria | 21 September | (France) Bruce Jouanny | (Belgium) Bas Leinders | (France) Franck Montagny | (Spain) Gabord Competición | Report |
| 7 | R1 | (Spain) Circuit de Catalunya, Montmeló | 5 October | (France) Franck Montagny | (France) Franck Montagny | (France) Franck Montagny | (Spain) Gabord Competición | Report |
| 7 | R2 | (Spain) Circuit de Catalunya, Montmeló | 5 October | (Spain) Ander Vilariño | (France) Jean-Christophe Ravier | (Spain) Ander Vilariño | (France) Epsilon by Graff | Report |
| 8 | R1 | (Spain) Circuit Ricardo Tormo | 19 October | (Belgium) Bas Leinders | (France) Stéphane Sarrazin | (Brazil) Enrique Bernoldi | (Italy) GD Racing | Report |
| 8 | R2 | (Spain) Circuit Ricardo Tormo | 19 October | (Spain) Ander Vilariño | (France) Jean-Christophe Ravier | (Spain) Polo Villaamil | (Italy) RC Motorsport | Report |
| 9 | R1 | (Spain) Circuito Permanente Del Jarama | 30 November | (Brazil) Enrique Bernoldi | (France) Franck Montagny | (Brazil) Enrique Bernoldi | (Italy) GD Racing | Report |
| 9 | R2 | (Spain) Circuito Permanente Del Jarama | 30 November | (Finland) Heikki Kovalainen | (Finland) Heikki Kovalainen | (Belgium) Bas Leinders | (Spain) Racing Engineering | Report |

Every second race saw a mandatory pit stop.

== Final points standings ==
=== Driver ===
For every race the points were awarded: 20 points to the winner, 15 for runner-up, 12 for third place, 10 for fourth place, 8 for fifth place, 6 for sixth place, 4 for seventh place, winding down to 1 point for 10th place. Lower placed drivers did not award points. Additional points were awarded to the driver setting the fastest race lap (2 points). The best 14 race results count, but all additional points count. One driver had a point deduction, which is given in ().

- Points System:

| Pos | 1 | 2 | 3 | 4 | 5 | 6 | 7 | 8 | 9 | 10 | FL |
|---|---|---|---|---|---|---|---|---|---|---|---|
| Pts | 20 | 15 | 12 | 10 | 8 | 6 | 4 | 3 | 2 | 1 | 2 |

| Pos | Driver | JAR (Spain) | | ZOL (Belgium) | | MAG (France) | | MNZ (Italy) | | LAU (Germany) | | A1R (Austria) | | CAT (Spain) | | VAL (Spain) | | JAR (Spain) | | Pts |
|---|---|---|---|---|---|---|---|---|---|---|---|---|---|---|---|---|---|---|---|---|
| 1 | (France) Franck Montagny | 1 | 1 | Ret | 1 | 1 | 1 | 1 | 13 | 1 | 2 | 7 | 1 | 1 | 5 | 3 | DNS | Ret | Ret | 241 |
| 2 | (Finland) Heikki Kovalainen | 4 | 3 | Ret | 7 | 5 | 6 | Ret | Ret | 2 | 1 | 8 | 6 | 6 | 8 | 6 | 4 | 2 | 5 | 131 |
| 3 | (Belgium) Bas Leinders | Ret | 4 | 2 | 14† | Ret | 5 | Ret | Ret | 4 | 5 | 1 | 2 | 7 | Ret | 5 | 5 | Ret | 1 | 128 |
| 4 | (India) Narain Karthikeyan | Ret | 5 | 4 | 3 | Ret | 4 | 3 | 3 | 6 | 4 | Ret | 4 | 4 | 2 | Ret | 9 | 7 | Ret | 121 |
| 5 | (France) Jean-Christophe Ravier | Ret | Ret | Ret | 2 | 4 | Ret | Ret | 4 | 7 | 3 | Ret | 16 | 3 | 4 | Ret | 3 | 3 | 2 | 116 |
| 6 | (Brazil) Enrique Bernoldi | 3 | 9 | 16† | Ret | Ret | Ret | 8 | Ret | 10 | 6 | 4 | 8 | 5 | 3 | 1 | 8 | 1 | 3 | 112 |
| 7 | (France) Stéphane Sarrazin | 7 | 11 | 15 | Ret | Ret | 2 | 2 | 1 | 3 | Ret | 2 | 7 | 11 | 6 | 10 | 7 | 5 | Ret | 110 |
| 8 | (Spain) Ander Vilariño | 2 | 10 | 8 | 10 | 9 | 12 | 9 | 14 | 5 | 8 | 3 | 15 | 2 | 1 | 4 | 6 | Ret | Ret | 98 |
| 9 | (France) Bruno Besson | 5 | 7 | 10 | 4 | 2 | 3 | 7 | 8 | 12 | 9 | 5 | 5 | 9 | Ret | 2 | Ret | Ret | 8 | 95 |
| 10 | (France) Bruce Jouanny | 6 | 12 | Ret | 5 | 6 | 8 | 5 | 2 | Ret | 10 | Ret | 3 | 15 | 13 | 9 | Ret | Ret | 10 | 62 |
| 11 | (Spain) Polo Villaamil | 9 | Ret | 5 | 8 | 3 | 7 | 10 | 9 | 11 | 15 | 9 | 13 | 8 | 14 | Ret | 1 | Ret | 7 | 61 |
| 12 | (Spain) Marc Gené | Ret | 2 | 1 | 13† | Ret | Ret | 4 | 6 | 8 | Ret | | | | | | | | | 54 |
| 13 | (United States) Paul Edwards | Ret | 6 | 6 | Ret | 10 | 10 | 11 | 10 | 9 | 11 | Ret | Ret | 13 | 7 | Ret | 10 | 4 | 9 | 34 |
| 14 | (Spain) Félix Porteiro | Ret | DNS | 7 | Ret | 11 | Ret | 12 | 11 | 13 | 7 | 12 | 11 | 10 | Ret | Ret | 2 | 9 | 11 | 26 |
| 15 | (Austria) Norbert Siedler | Ret | Ret | 3 | 6 | 12 | Ret | Ret | Ret | 19 | 17 | 6 | 10 | DNS | DNS | Ret | 12 | | | 25 |
| 16 | (Spain) Santiago Porteiro | Ret | 13 | 12 | 11 | 15 | Ret | Ret | 5 | 18 | 13 | Ret | DNS | 16 | 9 | 11 | Ret | 6 | Ret | 16 |
| 17 | (Brazil) Tuka Rocha | Ret | Ret | 9 | 9 | Ret | 9 | 6 | Ret | 14 | Ret | | | | | | | | | 12 |
| 18 | (Italy) Enrico Toccacelo | | | | | | | | | | | | | | | | | 10 | 4 | 11 |
| 19 | (Spain) Ángel Burgueño | 10 | 8 | Ret | Ret | 7 | Ret | Ret | Ret | 16 | 14 | 11 | 14 | 17 | 11 | 8 | Ret | Ret | Ret | 11 |
| 20 | (Brazil) Carlos Pereira | | | 11 | Ret | 8 | Ret | Ret | 7 | 17 | 16 | | | | | | | | | 7 |
| 21 | (Spain) Antonio García | | | | | | | | | | | | | | | | | Ret | 6 | 6 |
| 22 | (France) Didier Andre | 11 | 15 | 13 | 12 | 13 | 11 | 15 | 12 | 15 | 12 | 10 | 12 | 14 | 12 | 7 | 11 | 11 | Ret | 5 |
| 23 | (Chile) Pablo Donoso | | | | | | | | | | | | | | | | | 8 | 12† | 3 |
| 24 | (Mexico) Ricardo González | 8 | Ret | 14 | 15 | Ret | Ret | 14 | Ret | | | | | | | | | | | 3 |
| 25 | (Italy) Vitantonio Liuzzi | | | | | | | | | | | Ret | 9 | | | | | | | 2 |
| 26 | (Spain) José Manuel Pérez-Aicart | | | | | | | | | | | 13 | Ret | 12 | 10 | Ret | 13 | | | 1 |
| 27 | (France) Mathieu Zangarelli | | | | | 14 | Ret | 13 | Ret | | | | | | | | | | | 0 |
| 28 | (France) Jonathan Cochet | Ret | 14 | | | | | | | | | | | | | | | | | 0 |
| NC | (United Kingdom) Guy Smith | | | | | | | | | | | | | | | DNS | DNS | | | 0 |
| Pos | Driver | JAR (Spain) | | ZOL (Belgium) | | MAG (France) | | MNZ (Italy) | | LAU (Germany) | | A1R (Austria) | | BAR (Spain) | | VAL (Spain) | | JAR (Spain) | | Pts |

=== Escuderías ===
| Pos | Team | No. | JAR (Spain) | | ZOL (Belgium) | | MAG (France) | | MNZ (Italy) | | LAU (Germany) | | A1R (Austria) | | BAR (Spain) | | VAL (Spain) | | JAR (Spain) | | Pts |
|---|---|---|---|---|---|---|---|---|---|---|---|---|---|---|---|---|---|---|---|---|---|
| 1 | (Spain) Gabord Competición | 3 | 1 | 1 | Ret | 1 | 1 | 1 | 1 | 13 | 1 | 2 | 7 | 1 | 1 | 5 | 3 | DNS | Ret | Ret | 375 |
| 1 | (Spain) Gabord Competición | 4 | 4 | 3 | Ret | 7 | 5 | 6 | Ret | Ret | 2 | 1 | 8 | 6 | 6 | 8 | 6 | 4 | 2 | 5 | 375 |
| 2 | (Spain) Racing Engineering | 1 | 7 | 11 | 15 | Ret | Ret | 2 | 2 | 1 | 3 | Ret | 2 | 7 | 11 | 6 | 10 | 7 | 5 | Ret | 238 |
| 2 | (Spain) Racing Engineering | 2 | Ret | 4 | 2 | 14† | Ret | 5 | Ret | Ret | 4 | 5 | 1 | 2 | 7 | Ret | 5 | 5 | Ret | 1 | 238 |
| 3 | (Spain) Epsilon Euskadi | 7 | Ret | Ret | Ret | 2 | 4 | Ret | Ret | 4 | 7 | 3 | Ret | 16 | 3 | 4 | Ret | 3 | 3 | 2 | 214 |
| 3 | (Spain) Epsilon Euskadi | 8 | 2 | 10 | 8 | 10 | 9 | 12 | 9 | 14 | 5 | 8 | 3 | 15 | 2 | 1 | 4 | 6 | Ret | Ret | 214 |
| 4 | (United Kingdom) Tata Carlin Motorsport | 24 | Ret | 5 | 4 | 3 | Ret | 4 | 3 | 3 | 6 | 4 | Ret | 4 | 4 | 2 | Ret | 9 | 7 | Ret | 183 |
| 4 | (United Kingdom) Tata Carlin Motorsport | 25 | 6 | 12 | Ret | 5 | 6 | 8 | 5 | 2 | Ret | 10 | Ret | 3 | 15 | 13 | 9 | Ret | Ret | 10 | 183 |
| 5 | (Italy) GD Racing | 20 | Ret | 14 | 16† | Ret | Ret | Ret | 8 | Ret | 10 | 6 | 4 | 8 | 5 | 3 | 1 | 8 | 1 | 3 | 101 |
| 5 | (Italy) GD Racing | 21 | | | | | 14 | Ret | 13 | Ret | | | | | | | | | 8 | 12† | 101 |
| 6 | (France) Saulnier Racing | 22 | 11 | 15 | 13 | 12 | 13 | 11 | 15 | 12 | 15 | 12 | 10 | 12 | 14 | 12 | 7 | 11 | 11 | Ret | 100 |
| 6 | (France) Saulnier Racing | 23 | 5 | 7 | 10 | 4 | 2 | 3 | 7 | 8 | 12 | 9 | 5 | 5 | 9 | Ret | 2 | Ret | Ret | 8 | 100 |
| 7 | (Italy) RC Motorsport | 18 | 3 | '9 | 11 | Ret | 8 | Ret | Ret | 7 | 17 | 16 | Ret | 9 | DNS | DNS | Ret | 12 | 10 | 4 | 95 |
| 7 | (Italy) RC Motorsport | 19 | 9 | Ret | 5 | 8 | 3 | 7 | 10 | 9 | 11 | 15 | 9 | 13 | 8 | 14 | Ret | 1 | Ret | 7 | 95 |
| 8 | (Spain) Campos Motorsport | 9 | Ret | 2 | 1 | 13† | Ret | Ret | 4 | 6 | 8 | Ret | 13 | Ret | 12 | 10 | Ret | 13 | Ret | 6 | 77 |
| 8 | (Spain) Campos Motorsport | 10 | Ret | 13 | 12 | 11 | 15 | Ret | Ret | 5 | 18 | 13 | Ret | DNS | 16 | 9 | 11 | Ret | 6 | Ret | 77 |
| 9 | (Belgium) KTR | 5 | Ret | 6 | 6 | Ret | 10 | 10 | 11 | 10 | 9 | 11 | Ret | Ret | 13 | 7 | Ret | 10 | 4 | 9 | 60 |
| 9 | (Belgium) KTR | 6 | Ret | DNS | 7 | Ret | 11 | Ret | 12 | 11 | 13 | 7 | 12 | 11 | 10 | Ret | Ret | 2 | 9 | 11 | 60 |
| 10 | (Austria) Superfund Zele Racing | 14 | Ret | Ret | 3 | 6 | 12 | Ret | Ret | Ret | 19 | 17 | 6 | 10 | | | DNS | DNS | | | 37 |
| 10 | (Austria) Superfund Zele Racing | 15 | Ret | Ret | 9 | 9 | Ret | 9 | 6 | Ret | 14 | Ret | | | | | | | | | 37 |
| 11 | (Spain) Repsol RFS Vergani Racing | 11 | 8 | Ret | 14 | 15 | Ret | Ret | 14 | Ret | | | | | | | | | | | 14 |
| 11 | (Spain) Repsol RFS Vergani Racing | 12 | 10 | 8 | Ret | Ret | 7 | Ret | Ret | Ret | 16 | 14 | 11 | 14 | 17 | 11 | 8 | Ret | Ret | Ret | 14 |
| Pos | Team | No. | JAR (Spain) | | ZOL (Belgium) | | MAG (France) | | MNZ (Italy) | | LAU (Germany) | | A1R (Austria) | | BAR (Spain) | | VAL (Spain) | | JAR (Spain) | | Pts |
