= 2002 World Series by Nissan =

Seasons
- ← 2001 2003 →

The 2002 Telefónica World Series by Nissan was contested over 9 race weekends/18 rounds. In this one-make formula all drivers had to use Dallara chassis (Dallara SN01) and Nissan engines (Nissan VQ). 10 different teams and 30 different drivers competed.

== Teams and Drivers ==
Team	No.	Driver	Rounds
(France) Epsilon by Graff	1	(France) Jean-Christophe Ravier	All
(France) Epsilon by Graff	2	(Spain) Ander Vilariño	All
(Italy) Vergani Racing	3	(Macau) André Couto	All
(Italy) Vergani Racing	4	(Spain) Félix Porteiro	1-7
(Italy) Vergani Racing	4	(Venezuela) Milka Duno	8-9
(Spain) Campos Motorsport	5	(Spain) Antonio García	All
(Spain) Campos Motorsport	6	(Spain) Polo Villaamil	All
(Spain) Repsol-Meycom	7	(Spain) Ángel Burgueño	1-5, 8
(Spain) Repsol-Meycom	7	(Brazil) Rodrigo Sperafico	6-7
(Spain) Repsol-Meycom	7	(Brazil) Ricardo Sperafico	9
(Spain) Repsol-Meycom	8	(Spain) Víctor Ordoñez	1-7
(Spain) Repsol-Meycom	8	(Brazil) Rodrigo Sperafico	8-9
(Italy) GD Racing	9	(Spain) Rafael Sarandeses	1-4
(Italy) GD Racing	9	(France) Jonathan Cochet	5-6
(Italy) GD Racing	9	(France) Nicolas Minassian	7
(Italy) GD Racing	9	(Brazil) Wagner Ebrahim	8-9
(Italy) GD Racing	10	(Mexico) Roberto González	All
(Spain) Racing Engineering	11	(France) Franck Montagny	All
(Spain) Racing Engineering	12	(United Kingdom) Justin Wilson	All
(Spain) Gabord Competición	14	(Brazil) Tuka Rocha	All
(Spain) Gabord Competición	15	(Brazil) Ricardo Zonta	All
(Belgium) KTR	16	(Brazil) Luciano Gomide	1-6
(Belgium) KTR	16	(France) Jonathan Cochet	7
(Belgium) KTR	16	(United States) Paul Edwards	8-9
(Belgium) KTR	17	(Belgium) Bas Leinders	All
(Austria) Zele Racing	18	(Argentina) Nicolás Filiberti	1-6, 8
(Austria) Zele Racing	18	(Republic of Ireland) Damien Faulkner	7
(Austria) Zele Racing	19	(Republic of Ireland) Damien Faulkner	1-2
(Austria) Zele Racing	19	(Italy) Ivan Bellarosa	3-4
(Austria) Zele Racing	19	(Austria) Walter Lechner Jr.	5
(Austria) Zele Racing	19	(Spain) Rafael Sarandeses	6-7
(Austria) Zele Racing	19	(Brazil) Jaime Melo, Jr.	8-9
(Italy) Tata RC Motorsport	20	(Sweden) Peter Sundberg	All
(Italy) Tata RC Motorsport	21	(India) Narain Karthikeyan	All

== Calendar ==
Round		Circuit/Location	Date	Pole position	Fastest lap	Winner	Winning team	Report
1	R1	(Spain) Circuit Ricardo Tormo	12 May	(France) Franck Montagny	(Brazil) Ricardo Zonta	(Brazil) Ricardo Zonta	(Spain) Gabord Competición	Report
1	R2	(Spain) Circuit Ricardo Tormo	12 May	(France) Franck Montagny	(France) Franck Montagny	(France) Franck Montagny	(Spain) Racing Engineering	Report
2	R1	(Spain) Circuito Permanente Del Jarama	9 June	(Brazil) Ricardo Zonta	(Brazil) Ricardo Zonta	(Brazil) Ricardo Zonta	(Spain) Gabord Competición	Report
2	R2	(Spain) Circuito Permanente Del Jarama	9 June	(Brazil) Ricardo Zonta	(Brazil) Ricardo Zonta	(Brazil) Ricardo Zonta	(Spain) Gabord Competición	Report
3	R1	(Spain) Circuito de Albacete	23 June	(Portugal) André Couto	(France) Jean-Christophe Ravier	(France) Jean-Christophe Ravier	(France) Epsilon by Graff	Report
3	R2	(Spain) Circuito de Albacete	23 June	(Belgium) Bas Leinders	(Belgium) Bas Leinders	(Belgium) Bas Leinders	(Belgium) KTR	Report
4	R1	(Italy) Autodromo Nazionale Monza	7 July	(Belgium) Bas Leinders	(Belgium) Bas Leinders	(Belgium) Bas Leinders	(Belgium) KTR	Report
4	R2	(Italy) Autodromo Nazionale Monza	7 July	(France) Franck Montagny	(Belgium) Bas Leinders	(France) Franck Montagny	(Spain) Racing Engineering	Report
5	R1	(France) Circuit de Nevers Magny-Cours	31 August	(Brazil) Ricardo Zonta	(Brazil) Ricardo Zonta	(Brazil) Ricardo Zonta	(Spain) Gabord Competición	Report
5	R2	(France) Circuit de Nevers Magny-Cours	31 August	(United Kingdom) Justin Wilson	(Brazil) Ricardo Zonta	(France) Franck Montagny	(Spain) Racing Engineering	Report
6	R1	(Spain) Circuit de Catalunya, Montmeló	29 September	(United Kingdom) Justin Wilson	(Brazil) Ricardo Zonta	(Brazil) Ricardo Zonta	(Spain) Gabord Competición	Report
6	R2	(Spain) Circuit de Catalunya, Montmeló	29 September	(Brazil) Ricardo Zonta	(Belgium) Bas Leinders	(Brazil) Ricardo Zonta	(Spain) Gabord Competición	Report
7	R1	(Spain) Circuit Ricardo Tormo	20 October	(Spain) Ander Vilariño	(Brazil) Ricardo Zonta	(Brazil) Ricardo Zonta	(Spain) Gabord Competición	Report
7	R2	(Spain) Circuit Ricardo Tormo	20 October	(United Kingdom) Justin Wilson	(Brazil) Ricardo Zonta	(United Kingdom) Justin Wilson	(Spain) Racing Engineering	Report
8	R1	(Brazil) Autódromo Internacional de Curitiba	1 December	(Brazil) Ricardo Zonta	(Belgium) Bas Leinders	(Brazil) Ricardo Zonta	(Spain) Gabord Competición	Report
8	R2	(Brazil) Autódromo Internacional de Curitiba	1 December	(India) Narain Karthikeyan	(Belgium) Bas Leinders	(Brazil) Ricardo Zonta	(Spain) Gabord Competición	Report
9	R1	(Brazil) Autódromo José Carlos Pace, Interlagos	8 December	(France) Franck Montagny	(Brazil) Ricardo Zonta	(France) Franck Montagny	(Spain) Racing Engineering	Report
9	R2	(Brazil) Autódromo José Carlos Pace, Interlagos	8 December	(Brazil) Ricardo Zonta	(Brazil) Ricardo Zonta	(United Kingdom) Justin Wilson	(Spain) Racing Engineering	Report

Every second race saw a mandatory pit stop.

Race 17 originally scheduled over 17 laps, but abandoned due to rain.

== Final points standings ==
=== Driver ===
For every race the points were awarded: 20 points to the winner, 15 for runner-up, 12 for third place, 10 for fourth place, 8 for fifth place, 6 for sixth place, 4 for seventh place, winding down to 1 point for 10th place. Lower placed drivers did not award points. Additional points were awarded to the driver setting the fastest race lap (2 points). The best 14 race results count, but all additional points count. Three drivers had a point deduction, which are given in ().

- Points System:

Pos	1	2	3	4	5	6	7	8	9	10	FL
Pts	20	15	12	10	8	6	4	3	2	1	2

Pos	Driver	VAL (Spain)		JAR (Spain)		ALB (Spain)		MNZ (Italy)		MAG (France)		CAT (Spain)		VAL (Spain)		CUR (Brazil)		INT (Brazil)		Pts
1	(Brazil) Ricardo Zonta	1	3	1	1	2	2	5	5	1	2	1	1	1	2	1	1	DNS	5	270
2	(France) Franck Montagny	2	1	2	12	5	4	2	1	3	1	5	4	7	5	6	2	1	3	204
3	(Belgium) Bas Leinders	4	4	4	2	3	1	1	2	2	7	7	2	Ret	Ret	Ret	3	4	Ret	184
4	(United Kingdom) Justin Wilson	Ret	Ret	3	Ret	4	9	3	4	4	5	3	5	3	1	3	4	2	1	171
5	(Spain) Antonio García	6	9	8	7	DNS	DNS	Ret	Ret	5	3	6	6	Ret	DNS	5	6	6	2	82
6	(France) Jean-Christophe Ravier	8	5	15	5	1	Ret	14	Ret	16	14	4	3	11	3	17	Ret	Ret	6	81
7	(Macau) André Couto	Ret	Ret	11	8	11	3	7	3	7	11	2	15	Ret	Ret	2	Ret	10	11	66
8	(Spain) Ander Vilariño	Ret	2	12	13	13	Ret	12	11	10	6	13	Ret	2	6	8	8	15	7	53
9	(India) Narain Karthikeyan	10	Ret	9	3	Ret	Ret	17	Ret	9	Ret	DNS	DNS	5	12	4	9	7	4	51
10	(Spain) Polo Villaamil	Ret	Ret	5	Ret	Ret	Ret	16	9	8	13	12	17	Ret	7	7	5	3	Ret	41
11	(Brazil) Tuka Rocha	Ret	Ret	7	Ret	9	7	6	8	12	4	14	7	9	Ret	Ret	15	8	10	39
12	(Argentina) Nicolás Filiberti	5	7	DNS	4	Ret	8	8	7	Ret	16	18	12			12	12			32
13	(France) Jonathan Cochet									6	15	9	9	4	4					30
14	(Sweden) Peter Sundberg	Ret	10	13	6	6	5	15	6	DNS	DNS	11	13	14	10	9	DNS	14	Ret	30
15	(Spain) Ángel Burgueño	Ret	6	14	Ret	10	6	4	12	11	9					11	Ret			25
16	(Spain) Rafael Sarandeses	3	8	Ret	14	Ret	Ret	10	15			Ret	Ret	10	Ret					17
17	(Brazil) Luciano Gomide	7	11	10	10	7	12	9	14	17	12	10	8							16
18	(Brazil) Rodrigo Sperafico											8	10	6	11	14	11	11	9	12
19	(Spain) Félix Porteiro	9	Ret	6	11	Ret	Ret	11	10	13	Ret	16	16	8	Ret					12
20	(Brazil) Jaime Melo, Jr.															15	10	5	Ret	9
21	(United States) Paul Edwards															13	7	13	8	7
22	(Mexico) Roberto González	12	Ret	16	9	Ret	10	Ret	DNS	14	10	15	11	12	8	Ret	13	12	Ret	7
23	(Spain) Victor Ordóñez	13	Ret	Ret	DNS	8	11	13	Ret	Ret	17	17	14	Ret	13					3
24	(Austria) Walter Lechner Jr.									15	8									3
25	(Brazil) Wagner Ebrahim															10	14	9	Ret	3
26	(Republic of Ireland) Damien Faulkner	11	12	17	Ret									13	9					2
27	(Italy) Iván Bellarosa					12	13	Ret	13											0
28	(Venezuela) Milka Duno															16	16	DNS	12	0
29	(Brazil) Ricardo Sperafico																	Ret	Ret	0
30	(France) Nicolas Minassian													Ret	DNS					0
Pos	Driver	VAL (Spain)		JAR (Spain)		ALB (Spain)		MNZ (Italy)		MAG (France)		BAR (Spain)		VAL (Spain)		CUR (Brazil)		INT (Brazil)		Pts

=== Teams ===
Pos	Teams	No.	VAL (Spain)		JAR (Spain)		ALB (Spain)		MNZ (Italy)		MAG (France)		BAR (Spain)		VAL (Spain)		CUR (Brazil)		INT (Brazil)		Pts
1	(Spain) Racing Engineering	11	2	1	2	12	5	4	2	1	3	1	5	4	7	5	6	2	1	3	395
1	(Spain) Racing Engineering	12	Ret	Ret	3	Ret	4	9	3	4	4	5	3	5	3	1	3	4	2	1	395
2	(Spain) Gabord Competición	14	Ret	Ret	7	Ret	9	7	6	8	12	4	14	7	9	Ret	Ret	15	8	10	333
2	(Spain) Gabord Competición	15	1	3	1	1	2	2	5	5	1	2	1	1	1	2	1	1	DNS	5	333
3	(Belgium) KTR	16	7	11	10	10	7	12	9	14	17	12	10	8	4	4	13	7	13	8	227
3	(Belgium) KTR	17	4	4	4	2	3	1	1	2	2	7	7	2	Ret	Ret	Ret	3	4	Ret	227
4	(France) Epsilon by Graff	1	8	5	15	5	1	Ret	14	Ret	16	14	4	3	11	3	17	Ret	Ret	6	134
4	(France) Epsilon by Graff	2	Ret	2	12	13	13	Ret	12	11	10	6	13	Ret	2	6	8	8	15	7	134
5	(Spain) Campos Motorsport	5	6	9	8	7	DNS	DNS	Ret	Ret	5	3	6	6	Ret	DNS	5	6	6	2	110
5	(Spain) Campos Motorsport	6	Ret	Ret	5	Ret	Ret	Ret	16	9	8	13	12	17	Ret	7	7	5	3	Ret	110
6	(Italy) Vergani Racing	3	Ret	Ret	11	8	11	3	7	3	7	11	2	15	Ret	Ret	2	Ret	10	11	91
6	(Italy) Vergani Racing	4	9	Ret	6	11	Ret	Ret	11	10	13	Ret	16	16	8	Ret	16	16	DNS	12	91
7	(Italy) RC Motorsport	20	Ret	10	13	6	6	5	15	6	DNS	DNS	11	13	14	10	9	DNS	14	Ret	79
7	(Italy) RC Motorsport	21	10	Ret	9	3	Ret	Ret	17	Ret	9	Ret	DNS	DNS	5	12	4	9	7	4	79
8	(Austria) Zele Racing	18	5	7	DNS	4	Ret	8	8	7	Ret	16	18	12	13	9	12	12			46
8	(Austria) Zele Racing	19	11	12	17	Ret	12	13	Ret	13	15	8	Ret	Ret	10	Ret	15	10	5	Ret	46
9	(Spain) Repsol-Meycom	7	Ret	6	14	Ret	10	6	4	12	11	9	8	10	6	11	11	Ret	Ret	Ret	41
9	(Spain) Repsol-Meycom	8	13	Ret	Ret	DNS	8	11	13	Ret	Ret	17	17	14	Ret	13	14	11	11	9	41
10	(Italy) GD Racing	9	3	8	Ret	14	Ret	Ret	10	15	6	15	9	9	Ret	DNS	10	14	9	Ret	36
10	(Italy) GD Racing	10	12	Ret	16	9	Ret	10	Ret	DNS	14	10	15	11	12	8	Ret	13	12	Ret	36
Pos	Team	No.	VAL (Spain)		JAR (Spain)		ALB (Spain)		MNZ (Italy)		MAG (France)		BAR (Spain)		VAL (Spain)		CUR (Brazil)		INT (Brazil)		Pts
