= Racing Engineering =

Spanish racing team

(Spain) Racing Engineering
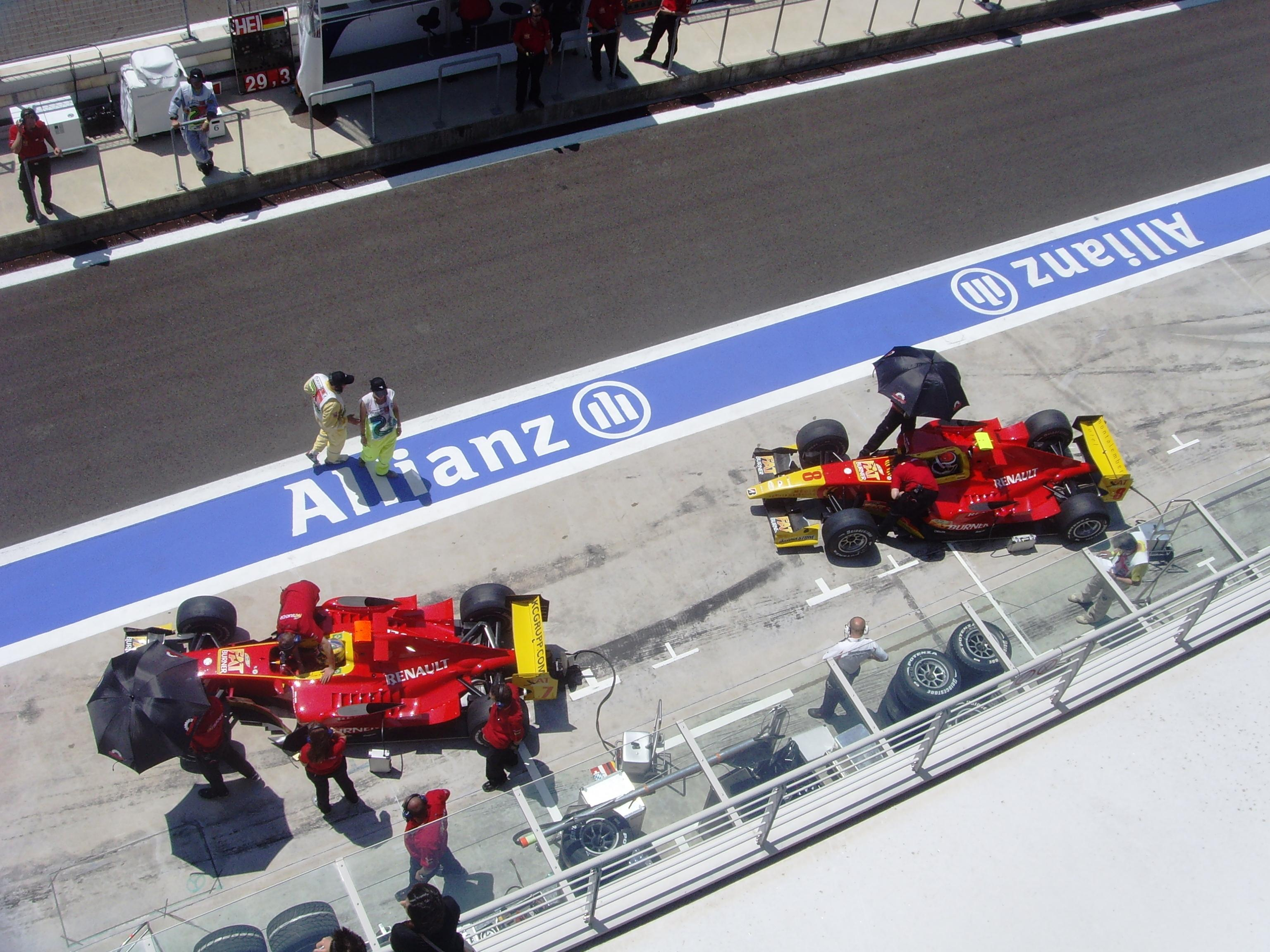
- Founded: 1999
- Founder(s): Alfonso de Orleans-Borbón
- Folded: 2019
- Base: Sanlúcar de Barrameda, Spain
- Team principal(s): Alfonso de Orleans-Borbón
- Current series: NASCAR Whelen Euro Series
- Former series: FIA Formula 2 Championship; GP2 Series; World Series by Nissan; Spanish F3; European Le Mans Series
- Current drivers: Elite 1: 48. (Spain) Ander Vilariño; 88. (France) Romain Iannetta; Elite 2: 48. (United States) Myatt Snider; 88. (France) Eric Clément
- Teams' Championships: Spanish Formula 3: 2001-2006; World Series by Nissan: 2002
- Drivers' Championships: Spanish Formula 3: 2001: Ander Vilariño; 2003: Ricardo Mauricio; 2004: Borja Garcia; GP2 Series: 2008: Giorgio Pantano; 2013: Fabio Leimer
- Website: racing-engineering.com

Racing Engineering is a Spanish racing team founded in 1999 by Alfonso de Orleans-Borbón that currently competes in the NASCAR Whelen Euro Series. The team's headquarters are located in Sanlúcar de Barrameda, near Jerez, where all car preparation and race team organization is based. The team has won 12 championships in many categories, including Spanish Formula 3, World Series by Nissan, and GP2 Series. Notable former Racing Engineering drivers include Sebastian Vettel, Lucas di Grassi, Alexander Rossi and Justin Wilson.

== History ==
In 2000, Racing Engineering participated in the 24 Hours of Le Mans, doing so in the GT Class with a Porsche 911 GT3-R.

In ten years of history, the team has won eleven championship titles, which is a record for any motor racing team in such a brief period of time.

Racing Engineering has participated in categories such as the Spanish GT Championship, Spanish Formula Three, in which Racing Engineering won all six consecutive championships in which it participated, World Series by Nissan and more recently, in the GP2 Series, the main feeder championship for Formula 1.

Racing Engineering participated in the Spanish Formula Three championship between 2001 and 2006 and were team champions in each of those years. The team featured names such as Nicolas Prost, Sebastian Vettel, Sébastien Buemi, Ricardo Mauricio, Álvaro Parente and Miguel Molina among their drivers. They also achieved the drivers’ title with Ander Vilariño in 2001, Ricardo Mauricio in 2003 and Borja Garcia in 2004.

The team also participated in the World Series by Nissan in 2002 and 2003. Winning the team championship in 2002 and were vice-champions in 2003.

In 2005 Racing Engineering embarked in a new adventure and joined the newly created GP2 Series. Since 2007, all efforts of the Spanish team are solely focused on this championship.

In 2005 Racing Engineering featured the Swiss Neel Jani and the recently crowned Spanish Formula 3 champion Borja Garcia. The team finished the season fifth in the teams’ championship.

For 2006, Racing Engineering signed Briton Adam Carroll and the young Spanish Javier Villa. The team finished the year in seventh position.

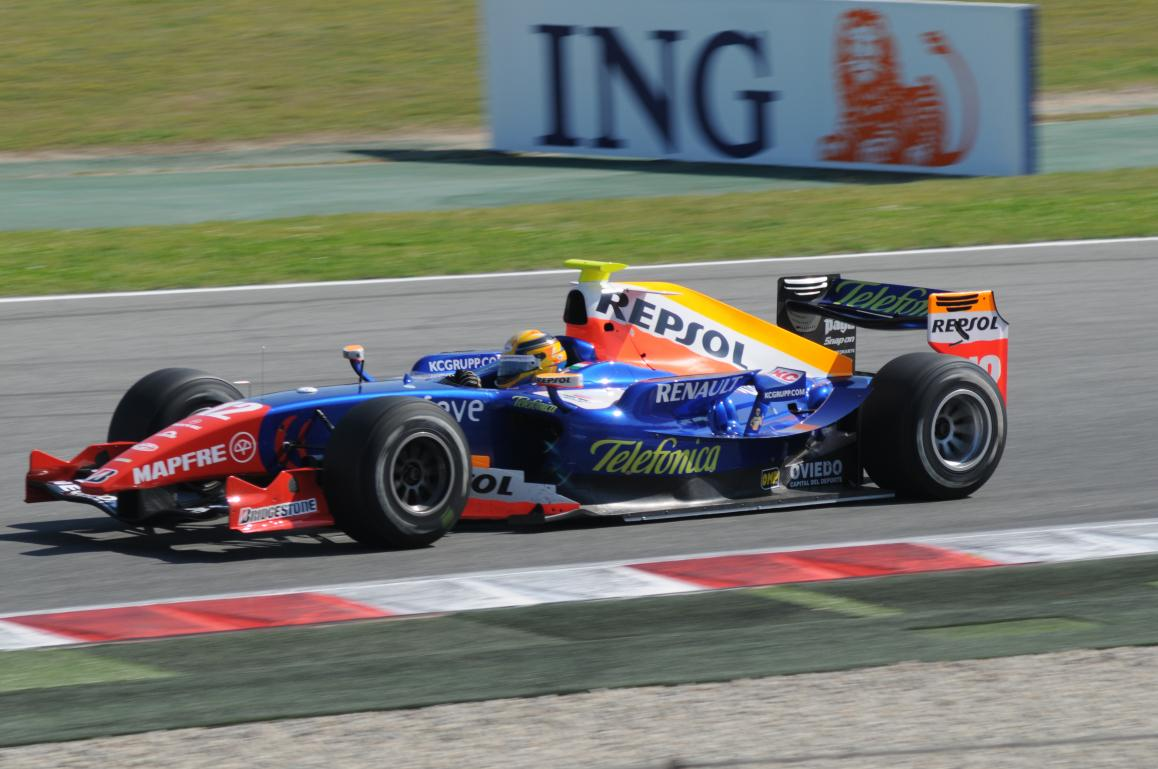
Giorgio Pantano - 2008 Racing Engineering

In 2007, Racing Engineering continued its GP2 participation with the young Javier Villa, who once more was the youngest driver in the field. The Spaniard celebrated three victories in the Racing Engineering car.

For the 2008 season, the drivers were Javier Villa, in his third season in the championship with the team, and Giorgio Pantano, another veteran. Pantano celebrated an amazing season and claimed the drivers' title, whilst the team finished in fourth position.

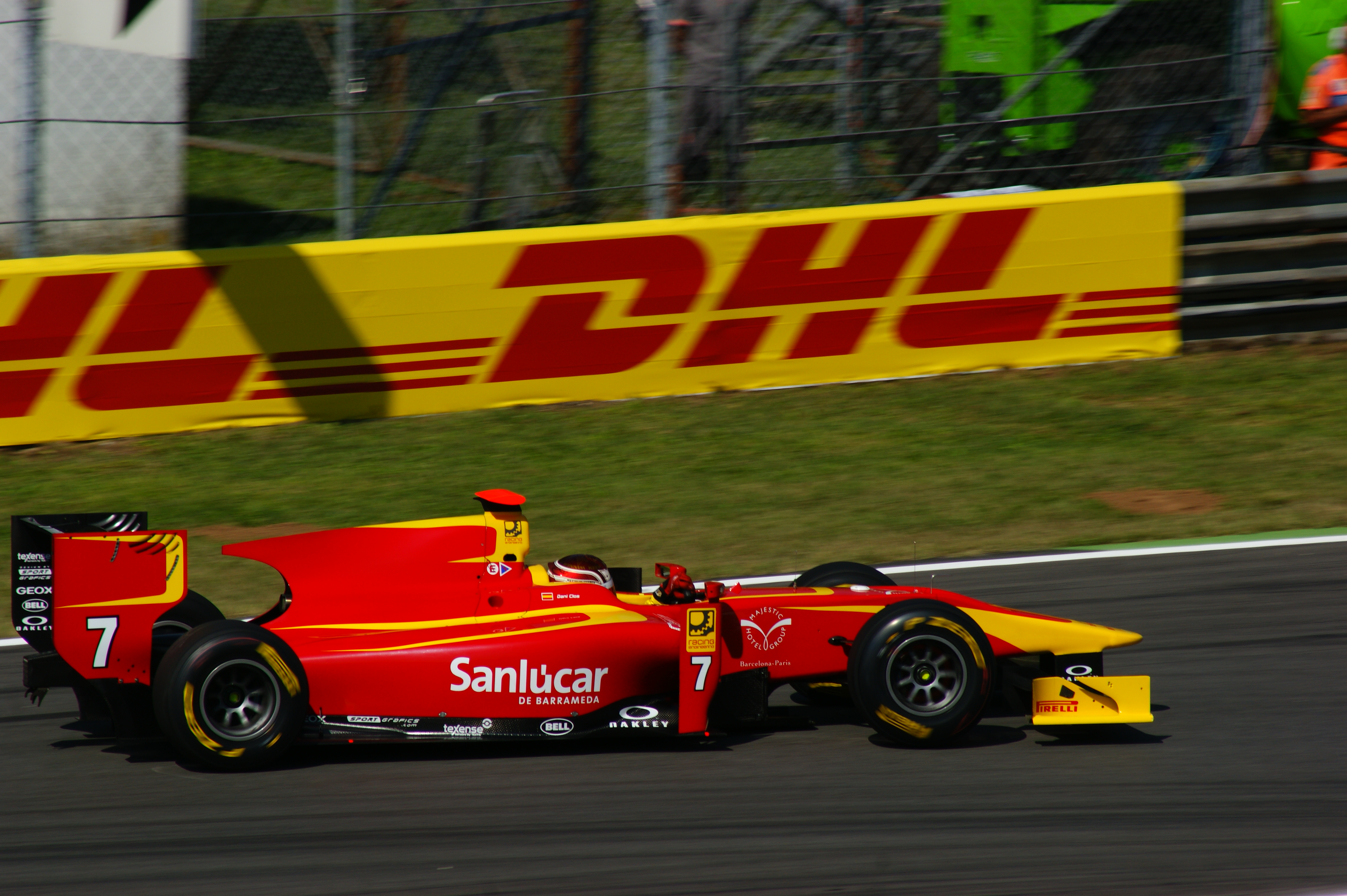
Dani Clos - 2011 Racing Engineering

For the 2009 season, Racing Engineering signed the young Spaniard Dani Clos for his debut in the category and Brazilian Lucas di Grassi, who was also the third driver for the Renault F1 Team. The Spanish rookie achieved his first podium at the Portimao round, whilst Di Grassi was third in the championship and, for the 2010 season, graduated to F1.

For the 2010 season Dani Clos continued with the team. Whilst continuing with their policy of having an experienced driver and giving a chance to a rookie, Racing Engineering signed the German newcomer Christian Vietoris, vice-champion of the 2009 F3 Euroseries. Dani Clos has been in the fight for the drivers’ championship right up until the penultimate round, having achieved pole position in Monaco and having won the sprint race in Istanbul, as well as finishing on the podium several times during the season.
Christian Vietoris achieved his first win in the championship during the sprint race in Monza after a rocket start. For the last round in Abu Dhabi, Vietoris suffered an appendicitis at the last minute, with Racing engineering being able to secure Ho-Pin Tung as a replacement just in time for the practice session. Dani Clos ended the season just one point shy of being third in the championship, whilst Racing Engineering finished the season in fourth position in the teams' table.
For the 2011 GP2 season, Racing Engineering competed in the Asia Series for the first time, with Nathanaël Berthon joining Clos on the driving strength. Clos took victory in the final race of the truncated season, elevating the team to ninth in the championship. Vietoris returned for the main series, replacing Berthon, but was then injured and sat out four races, for which he was replaced by Álvaro Parente. After Vietoris' return, he won two races and finished ninth in the drivers' championship, ahead of Clos (ninth) and Parente (16th), who also raced for the Carlin team later in the year. Racing Engineering finished a career-best third in the teams' championship, behind Addax and DAMS.

In 2012, Racing Engineering signed Fabio Leimer and rookie Nathanaël Berthon for the 2012 season, the Asia Series having been discontinued. Leimer finished seventh in the drivers' championship with six podium finishes, a pole position and two fastest laps; Berthon was twelfth with two second-placed finishes. The team manage to get to fourth place in the teams' championship.

In 2013 Racing Engineering finished the GP2 Team’s Championship in third with Fabio Leimer and Julián Leal behind the wheels of the Spanish team’s cars. The young Swiss Fabio Leimer was crowned 2013 GP2 Champion at the YAS Marina Circuit in Abu Dhabi, while his teammate Julián Leal finished the season as 12th in the overall standings.

In 2014, the team signed Stefano Coletti and Ferrari junior Raffaele Marciello as their drivers for the 2014 season. The team achieved three victories and finished fourth in the teams' championship, with Coletti finishing 6th and Marciello 8th in the drivers' championship.

For 2015, Racing Engineering signed Jordan King as one of their drivers. On February 27, the team confirmed Alexander Rossi for a drive in the 2015 season. The team finished second in the standings with Rossi scoring three wins and finishing runner-up.

The team retained King for the 2016 season whilst signing Norman Nato and retained second in the championship with four wins from the pair.

For the 2017 season, Nyck de Vries and Gustav Malja were signed to the team.

The 2018 season sees the Spanish team compete in the European Le Mans Series, which means a return to endurance racing for Racing Engineering. The team will compete with an LMP2 car.

For the 2019 season, Racing Engineering will compete in the NASCAR Whelen Euro Series. Three-time Euro Series champion Ander Vilariño, who won the Spanish Formula Three championship with the team in 2001, returns to the team to compete in the No. 48 Ford Mustang in the Elite 1 class. He will be partnered by 2018 NASCAR Camping World Truck Series Rookie of the Year Myatt Snider in the Elite 2 class. The team would also field Romain Iannetta and Eric Clément in the No. 88 Ford Mustang in the Elite 1 and Elite 2 class respectively.

== Results ==
=== NASCAR Whelen Euro Series – Elite 1 ===
Year	Car	No.	Drivers	Races	Wins	Poles	FLaps	Points	D.C.
2019	Ford Mustang	48	(Spain) Ander Vilariño	4*	2*	2*	1*	123*	5th*
2019	Ford Mustang	88	(France) Romain Iannetta	4*	0*	0*	0*	82*	16th*

^{*} Season still in progress.

=== NASCAR Whelen Euro Series – Elite 2 ===
Year	Car	No.	Drivers	Races	Wins	Poles	FLaps	Points	D.C.
2019	Ford Mustang	48	(United States) Myatt Snider	4*	0*	2*	2*	101*	6th*
2019	Ford Mustang	88	(France) Eric Clément	2*	0*	0*	0*	15*	32nd*

^{*} Season still in progress.

=== European Le Mans Series ===
Year	Car	Drivers	Races	Wins	Poles	FLaps	Points	D.C.	T.C.
2018	Oreca 07	(France) Norman Nato (France) Paul Petit (France) Olivier Pla (France) Matthieu Vaxivière	6	1	0	2	66	-	2nd

=== FIA Formula 2 Championship ===
Year	Car	Drivers	Races	Wins	Poles	FLaps	Points	D.C.	T.C.
2017	Dallara GP2/11-Mecachrome	(Switzerland) Louis Delétraz†	14	0	0	0	16	17th	8th
2017	Dallara GP2/11-Mecachrome	(Netherlands) Nyck de Vries†	8	1	0	1	114	7th	8th
2017	Dallara GP2/11-Mecachrome	(Sweden) Gustav Malja	22	0	0	0	44	11th	8th

† Delétraz and De Vries exchanged their seats at Racing Engineering and Rapax, respectively.

=== GP2 Series ===
Year	Car	Drivers	Races	Wins	Poles	F.L.	Points	D.C.	T.C.
2005	Dallara GP2/05-Mecachrome	(Switzerland) Neel Jani	23	2	1	0	48	7th	5th
2005	Dallara GP2/05-Mecachrome	(Spain) Borja García	22	0	0	0	17.5	14th	5th
2006	Dallara GP2/05-Mecachrome	(United Kingdom) Adam Carroll	21	0	1	0	33	8th	7th
2006	Dallara GP2/05-Mecachrome	(Spain) Javier Villa	21	0	0	0	0	26th	7th
2007	Dallara GP2/05-Mecachrome	(Spain) Javier Villa	21	3	0	0	42	5th	6th
2007	Dallara GP2/05-Mecachrome	(Brazil) Sérgio Jimenez	5	0	0	0	4	24th	6th
2007	Dallara GP2/05-Mecachrome	(Venezuela) Ernesto Viso	3	0	0	0	0	29th	6th
2007	Dallara GP2/05-Mecachrome	(Portugal) Filipe Albuquerque	2	0	0	0	0	32nd	6th
2007	Dallara GP2/05-Mecachrome	(Spain) Marcos Martínez	8	0	0	0	5	22nd	6th
2008	Dallara GP2/08-Mecachrome	(Spain) Javier Villa	20	0	0	0	8	17th	4th
2008	Dallara GP2/08-Mecachrome	(Italy) Giorgio Pantano	20	4	4	4	76	1st	4th
2009	Dallara GP2/08-Mecachrome	(Brazil) Lucas di Grassi	20	1	1	1	63	3rd	4th
2009	Dallara GP2/08-Mecachrome	(Spain) Dani Clos	20	0	0	0	4	21st	4th
2010	Dallara GP2/08-Mecachrome	(Spain) Dani Clos	20	1	1	1	51	4th	4th
2010	Dallara GP2/08-Mecachrome	(Germany) Christian Vietoris	18	1	0	0	29	9th	4th
2010	Dallara GP2/08-Mecachrome	(China) Ho-Pin Tung†	2	0	0	0	0	28th	4th
2011	Dallara GP2/11-Mecachrome	(Spain) Dani Clos	18	0	0	0	30	9th	3rd
2011	Dallara GP2/11-Mecachrome	(Germany) Christian Vietoris	14	2	1	2	35	7th	3rd
2011	Dallara GP2/11-Mecachrome	(Portugal) Álvaro Parente‡	4	0	0	0	8	16th	3rd
2012	Dallara GP2/11-Mecachrome	(Switzerland) Fabio Leimer	23	0	1	2	152	7th	4th
2012	Dallara GP2/11-Mecachrome	(France) Nathanaël Berthon	23	0	0	0	60	12th	4th
2013	Dallara GP2/11-Mecachrome	(Switzerland) Fabio Leimer	23	3	1	1	201	1st	3rd
2013	Dallara GP2/11-Mecachrome	(Colombia) Julián Leal	23	0	0	0	62	12th	3rd
2014	Dallara GP2/11-Mecachrome	(Italy) Raffaele Marciello	20	1	1	0	74	8th	4th
2014	Dallara GP2/11-Mecachrome	(Monaco) Stefano Coletti	20	2	0	5	115	6th	4th
2015	Dallara GP2/11-Mecachrome	(United Kingdom) Jordan King	21	0	0	1	60	12th	2nd
2015	Dallara GP2/11-Mecachrome	(United States) Alexander Rossi	21	3	1	0	181.5	2nd	2nd
2016	Dallara GP2/11-Mecachrome	(France) Norman Nato	22	2	1	1	136	5th	2nd
2016	Dallara GP2/11-Mecachrome	(United Kingdom) Jordan King	22	2	0	1	122	7th	2nd

† Tung also competed in 14 races for DAMS in 2010.
‡ Parente also competed in 8 races for Carlin in 2011.

=== World Series by Nissan ===
World Series by Nissan results
Year	Car	Drivers	Races	Wins	Poles	Fast laps	Points	D.C.	T.C.
2002	Dallara SN01-Nissan	(France) Franck Montagny	18	4	3	2	222	2nd	1st
2002	Dallara SN01-Nissan	(United Kingdom) Justin Wilson	18	2	2	1	173	4th	1st
2003	Dallara SN01-Nissan	(France) Stéphane Sarrazin	18	1	2	4	110	7th	2nd
2003	Dallara SN01-Nissan	(Belgium) Bas Leinders	18	2	2	1	128	3rd	2nd

=== Spanish Formula 3 ===
Spanish Formula Three results
Year	Car	Drivers	Races	Wins	Poles	Fast laps	Points	D.C.	T.C.
2001	Dallara F300-Toyota	(Spain) Ander Vilariño	13	6	7	7	196	1st	1st
2001	Dallara F300-Toyota	(France) Benjamin Poron	6	0	0	0	28	18th	1st
2001	Dallara F300-Toyota	(Spain) Daniel Martin	8	1	1	2	157	2nd	1st
2002	Dallara F300-Toyota	(Portugal) Álvaro Parente	13	1	1	1	139	4th	1st
2002	Dallara F300-Toyota	(Spain) Andy Soucek	13	0	1	0	118	8th	1st
2002	Dallara F300-Toyota	(France) Lucas Lasserre	13	3	0	1	183	2nd	1st
2003	Dallara F300-Toyota	(Spain) Pedro Barral	13	0	0	1	97	8th	1st
2003	Dallara F300-Toyota	(Brazil) Ricardo Mauricio	13	6	4	2	192	1st	1st
2003	Dallara F300-Toyota	(Germany) Dennis Furchheim	5	0	0	0	28	16th	1st
2003	Dallara F300-Toyota	(Spain) Juan Antonio del Pino	5	0	0	0	76	10th	1st
2003	Dallara F300-Toyota	(Belgium) Jan Heylen	2	0	0	0			1st
2003	Dallara F300-Toyota	(Portugal) Lourenço da Veiga	12	0	0	0	89	9th	1st
2004	Dallara F300-Toyota	(Spain) Borja Garcia	13	9	8	8	149	1st	1st
2004	Dallara F300-Toyota	(United Kingdom) Steven Kane	12	1	1	2	100	3rd	1st
2004	Dallara F300-Toyota	(Spain) Maria de Villota	12	0	0	0	13	12th	1st
2004	Dallara F300-Toyota	(Spain) Emilio de Villota Jr.	2	0	0	0			1st
2005	Dallara F305-Toyota	(Spain) Javier Villa	15	3	3	5	96	4th	1st
2005	Dallara F305-Toyota	(Argentina) Ricardo Risatti	15	4	5	4	96	3rd	1st
2005	Dallara F305-Toyota	(Portugal) Filipe Albuquerque	12	1	1	0	52	6th	1st
2005	Dallara F305-Toyota	(Germany) Sebastian Vettel	1	0	0	0	8	15th	1st
2005	Dallara F305-Toyota	(Switzerland) Sébastien Buemi	2	0	0	0			1st
2006	Dallara F305-Toyota	(Spain) Marcos Martinez Ucha	14	1	0	0	28	10th	1st
2006	Dallara F305-Toyota	(Spain) Javier Villa	2	0	0	0	10	15th	1st
2006	Dallara F305-Toyota	(France) Nicolas Prost	16	1	0	0	83	4th	1st
2006	Dallara F305-Toyota	(Spain) Miguel Molina	15	1	0	0	73	6th	1st
2006	Dallara F305-Toyota	(Brazil) Sérgio Jimenez	16	1	1	1	74	5th	1st

Reference: GP2 and Formula 3000 entrylist and complete results

== Results in detail ==
=== GP2 Series ===
(key) (Races in bold indicate pole position) (Races in italics indicate fastest lap)

Year	Chassis Engine Tyres	Drivers	1	2	3	4	5	6	7	8	9	10	11	12	13	14	15	16	17	18	19	20	21	22	23	24	T.C.	Points
2005	GP2/05; Renault; **B**		SMR; FEA	SMR; SPR	CAT; FEA	CAT; SPR	MON; FEA	NÜR; FEA	NÜR; SPR	MAG; FEA	MAG; SPR	SIL; FEA	SIL; SPR	HOC; FEA	HOC; SPR	HUN; FEA	HUN; SPR	IST; FEA	IST; SPR	MNZ; FEA	MNZ; SPR	SPA; FEA	SPA; SPR	BHR; FEA	BHR; SPR		5th	65.5
2005	GP2/05; Renault; **B**	(Switzerland) Neel Jani	6	15	4	5	Ret	6	13†	5	4	5	6	Ret	22	**1**	4	Ret	Ret	7	1	16	18	16	13		5th	65.5
2005	GP2/05; Renault; **B**	(Spain) Borja García	Ret	10	Ret	10	10†	Ret	EX	Ret	12	17	9	17	5	11	Ret	3	5	Ret	10	6	2	19	17		5th	65.5
2006	GP2/05; Renault; **B**		VAL; FEA	VAL; SPR	SMR; FEA	SMR; SPR	NÜR; FEA	NÜR; SPR	CAT; FEA	CAT; SPR	MON; FEA	SIL; FEA	SIL; SPR	MAG; FEA	MAG; SPR	HOC; FEA	HOC; SPR	HUN; FEA	HUN; SPR	IST; FEA	IST; SPR	MNZ; FEA	MNZ; SPR				7th	33
2006	GP2/05; Renault; **B**	(United Kingdom) Adam Carroll	14	Ret	Ret	12	3	5	10	12	Ret	**3**	2	20	14	6	8	7	Ret	6	3	Ret	Ret				7th	33
2006	GP2/05; Renault; **B**	(Spain) Javier Villa	18	9	13	18	9	20	14	15	Ret	14	13	17	16	11	13	Ret	15†	15	16	9	Ret				7th	33
2007	GP2/05; Renault; **B**		BHR; FEA	BHR; SPR	CAT; FEA	CAT; SPR	MON; FEA	MAG; FEA	MAG; SPR	SIL; FEA	SIL; SPR	NÜR; FEA	NÜR; SPR	HUN; FEA	HUN; SPR	IST; FEA	IST; SPR	MNZ; FEA	MNZ; SPR	SPA; FEA	SPA; SPR	VAL; FEA	VAL; SPR				6th	51
2007	GP2/05; Renault; **B**	(Spain) Javier Villa	Ret	10	8	2	Ret	7	1	13	22†	8	1	8	1	12	Ret	6	Ret	4	15	8	2				6th	51
2007	GP2/05; Renault; **B**	(Brazil) Sérgio Jimenez	19†	Ret	7	5	17†																				6th	51
2007	GP2/05; Renault; **B**	(Venezuela) Ernesto Viso						Ret	DNS			14	8														6th	51
2007	GP2/05; Renault; **B**	(Portugal) Filipe Albuquerque								15	14																6th	51
2007	GP2/05; Renault; **B**	(Spain) Marcos Martínez												DNQ	DNQ	13	Ret	Ret	Ret	Ret	Ret	4	22				6th	51
2008	GP2/08; Renault; **B**		CAT; FEA	CAT; SPR	IST; FEA	IST; SPR	MON; FEA	MON; FEA	MAG; FEA	MAG; SPR	SIL; FEA	SIL; SPR	HOC; FEA	HOC; SPR	HUN; FEA	HUN; SPR	VAL; FEA	VAL; SPR	SPA; FEA	SPA; SPR	MNZ; FEA	MNZ; SPR					4th	84
2008	GP2/08; Renault; **B**	(Spain) Javier Villa	14	6	7	15	14	13	14	10	13	Ret	10†	5	13	6	Ret	5	17	8	Ret	EX					4th	84
2008	GP2/08; Renault; **B**	(Italy) Giorgio Pantano	4	3	**1**	4	Ret	Ret	1	Ret	1	3	**1**	Ret	14	5	**14**†	3	DSQ	EX	**10**	5					4th	84
2009	GP2/08; Renault; **B**		CAT; FEA	CAT; SPR	MON; FEA	MON; FEA	IST; FEA	IST; SPR	SIL; FEA	SIL; SPR	NÜR; FEA	NÜR; SPR	HUN; FEA	HUN; SPR	VAL; FEA	VAL; SPR	SPA; FEA	SPA; SPR	MNZ; FEA	MNZ; SPR	ALG; FEA	ALG; SPR					4th	67
2009	GP2/08; Renault; **B**	(Brazil) Lucas di Grassi	Ret	10	4	4	8	1	2	19	7	Ret	**2**	3	19†	Ret	3	Ret	3	2	3	15					4th	67
2009	GP2/08; Renault; **B**	(Spain) Dani Clos	Ret	19	Ret	Ret	12	7	13	Ret	16	8	11	11	Ret	Ret	10	Ret	15	Ret	9	3					4th	67
2010	GP2/08; Renault; **B**		CAT; FEA	CAT; SPR	MON; FEA	MON; SPR	IST; FEA	IST; SPR	VAL; FEA	VAL; SPR	SIL; FEA	SIL; SPR	HOC; FEA	HOC; SPR	HUN; FEA	HUN; SPR	SPA; FEA	SPA; SPR	MNZ; FEA	MNZ; SPR	YMC; FEA	YMC; SPR					4th	80
2010	GP2/08; Renault; **B**	(Spain) Dani Clos	3	6	**3**	Ret	8	1	5	7	3	3	4	6	16	7	Ret	DNS	Ret	12	4	4					4th	80
2010	GP2/08; Renault; **B**	(Germany) Christian Vietoris	Ret	18	14	DNS	7	Ret	12	Ret	6	10	Ret	10	2	2	11	Ret	4	1							4th	80
2010	GP2/08; Renault; **B**	(China) Ho-Pin Tung																			Ret	13					4th	80
2011	GP2/11; Mecachrome; **P**		IST; FEA	IST; SPR	CAT; FEA	CAT; SPR	MON; FEA	MON; SPR	VAL; FEA	VAL; SPR	SIL; FEA	SIL; SPR	NÜR; FEA	NÜR; SPR	HUN; FEA	HUN; SPR	SPA; FEA	SPA; SPR	MNZ; FEA	MNZ; SPR							3rd	73
2011	GP2/11; Mecachrome; **P**	(Spain) Dani Clos	8	15	6	2	Ret	18	4	5	6	2	7	Ret	10	Ret	6	6	13	7							3rd	73
2011	GP2/11; Mecachrome; **P**	(Germany) Christian Vietoris	11	Ret					Ret	13	2	Ret	Ret	4	8	10	**1**	13	6	1							3rd	73
2011	GP2/11; Mecachrome; **P**	(Portugal) Álvaro Parente			11	7	2	16																			3rd	73
2012	GP2/11; Mecachrome; **P**		SEP; FEA	SEP; SPR	BHR1; FEA	BHR1; SPR	BHR2; FEA	BHR2; SPR	CAT; FEA	CAT; SPR	MON; FEA	MON; SPR	VAL; FEA	VAL; SPR	SIL; FEA	SIL; SPR	HOC; FEA	HOC; SPR	HUN; FEA	HUN; SPR	SPA; FEA	SPA; SPR	MNZ; FEA	MNZ; SPR	MRN; FEA	MRN; SPR	4th	212
2012	GP2/11; Mecachrome; **P**	(Switzerland) Fabio Leimer	4	6	7	12	2	8	12	11	18	Ret	4	3	**14**	9	2	4	9	14	Ret	5	5	2	3	3	4th	212
2012	GP2/11; Mecachrome; **P**	(France) Nathanaël Berthon	11	8	21†	Ret	12	10	5	2	9	7	6	5	12	14	15	9	7	2	14	19	15	15	10	15	4th	212
2013	GP2/11; Mecachrome; **P**		SEP; FEA	SEP; SPR	BHR; FEA	BHR; SPR	CAT; FEA	CAT; SPR	MON; FEA	MON; SPR	SIL; FEA	SIL; SPR	NÜR; FEA	NÜR; SPR	HUN; FEA	HUN; SPR	SPA; FEA	SPA; SPR	MNZ; FEA	MNZ; SPR	MRN; FEA	MRN; SPR	YMC; FEA	YMC; SPR			3rd	263
2013	GP2/11; Mecachrome; **P**	(Colombia) Julián Leal	5	Ret	19	16	13	25†	Ret	14	8	4	22	12	15	21	6	2	5	3	Ret	12	16	10			3rd	263
2013	GP2/11; Mecachrome; **P**	(Switzerland) Fabio Leimer	1	12	**1**	9	18	9	Ret	13	4	15	4	3	4	3	4	5	1	6	5	3	4	3			3rd	263
2014	GP2/11; Mecachrome; **P**		BHR; FEA	BHR; SPR	CAT; FEA	CAT; SPR	MON; FEA	MON; SPR	RBR; FEA	RBR; SPR	SIL; FEA	SIL; SPR	HOC; FEA	HOC; SPR	HUN; FEA	HUN; SPR	SPA; FEA	SPA; SPR	MNZ; FEA	MNZ; SPR	SOC; FEA	SOC; SPR	YMC; FEA	YMC; SPR			4th	210
2014	GP2/11; Mecachrome; **P**	(Italy) Raffaele Marciello	18	24	Ret	16	12	19	3	3	**Ret**	Ret	17	Ret	19	8	1	14	Ret	18	3	Ret	11	7			4th	210
2014	GP2/11; Mecachrome; **P**	(Monaco) Stefano Coletti	4	23	16	8	Ret	9	4	2	4	2	4	1	18	Ret	Ret	7	9	2	Ret	8	7	1			4th	210
2015	GP2/11; Mecachrome; **P**		BHR; FEA	BHR; SPR	CAT; FEA	CAT; SPR	MON; FEA	MON; SPR	RBR; FEA	RBR; SPR	SIL; FEA	SIL; SPR	HUN; FEA	HUN; SPR	SPA; FEA	SPA; SPR	MNZ; FEA	MNZ; SPR	SOC; FEA	SOC; SPR	BHR; FEA	BHR; SPR	YMC; FEA	YMC; SPR			2nd	241.5
2015	GP2/11; Mecachrome; **P**	(United Kingdom) Jordan King	4	9	14	11	9	Ret	12	7	22†	10	6	12	8	2	8	Ret	Ret	15	9	6	6	C			2nd	241.5
2015	GP2/11; Mecachrome; **P**	(United States) Alexander Rossi	3	4	3	4	**2**	7	6	8	2	4	12	20	6	1	1	Ret	1	6	18	9	4	C			2nd	241.5
2016	GP2/11; Mecachrome; **P**		CAT; FEA	CAT; SPR	MON; FEA	MON; SPR	BAK; FEA	BAK; SPR	RBR; FEA	RBR; SPR	SIL; FEA	SIL; SPR	HUN; FEA	HUN; SPR	HOC; FEA	HOC; SPR	SPA; FEA	SPA; SPR	MNZ; FEA	MNZ; SPR	SEP; FEA	SEP; SPR	YMC; FEA	YMC; SPR			2nd	258
2016	GP2/11; Mecachrome; **P**	(France) Norman Nato	1	16	2	6	Ret	Ret	7	12	**7**	22†	7	3	Ret	18	Ret	8	5	1	3	Ret	6	5			2nd	258
2016	GP2/11; Mecachrome; **P**	(United Kingdom) Jordan King	7	3	Ret	16	12†	4	8	1	8	1	8	2	15	11	2	12	7	4	5	14	13	10			2nd	258

=== GP2 Final ===
(key) (Races in bold indicate pole position) (Races in italics indicate fastest lap)

Year	Chassis Engine Tyres	Drivers	1	2	T.C.	Points
2011	GP2/11; Mecachrome; **P**		YMC; FEA	YMC; SPR	**2nd**	**13**
2011	GP2/11; Mecachrome; **P**	(Switzerland) Fabio Leimer	**1**	10	**2nd**	**13**
2011	GP2/11; Mecachrome; **P**	(France) Nathanaël Berthon	9	19	**2nd**	**13**

=== GP2 Asia Series ===
Year	Chassis Engine Tyres	Drivers	1	2	3	4	T.C.	Points
2011	GP2/11; Mecachrome; **P**		YMC; FEA	YMC; SPR	IMO; FEA	IMO; SPR	9th	8
2011	GP2/11; Mecachrome; **P**	(France) Nathanaël Berthon	Ret	14	Ret	13	9th	8
2011	GP2/11; Mecachrome; **P**	(Spain) Dani Clos	Ret	22	7	1	9th	8

=== FIA Formula 2 Championship ===
Year	Chassis Engine Tyres	Drivers	1	2	3	4	5	6	7	8	9	10	11	12	13	14	15	16	17	18	19	20	21	22	T.C.	Points
2017	GP2/11; Mecachrome; **P**		BHR; FEA	BHR; SPR	CAT; FEA	CAT; SPR	MON; FEA	MON; SPR	BAK; FEA	BAK; SPR	RBR; FEA	RBR; SPR	SIL; FEA	SIL; SPR	HUN; FEA	HUN; SPR	SPA; FEA	SPA; SPR	MNZ; FEA	MNZ; SPR	JER; FEA	JER; SPR	YMC; FEA	YMC; SPR	8th	87
2017	GP2/11; Mecachrome; **P**	(Switzerland) Louis Delétraz	20	12	11	14	14	16	Ret	16	17	13	12	13	10	12									8th	87
2017	GP2/11; Mecachrome; **P**	(Netherlands) Nyck de Vries															5	2	18	12	13	6	4	9	8th	87
2017	GP2/11; Mecachrome; **P**	(Sweden) Gustav Malja	18	13	7	6	6	3	11	13	12	15	14	9	13	NC	4	11	8	18	14	18	11	17	8th	87

== Timeline ==
Former series
Spanish Formula Three Championship	2001–2006
World Series by Nissan	2002-2003
GP2 Asia	2011
GP2 Series	2005–2016
FIA Formula 2 Championship	2017
European Le Mans Series	2018
NASCAR Whelen Euro Series	2019
