= 2016 Monaco GP2 Series round =

Motor race

2016 Monaco GP2 round
Round details
- Round 2 of 11 rounds in the 2016 GP2 Series
- Layout of the Circuit de Monaco
- Location: Circuit de Monaco, Monte Carlo, Monaco
- Course: Street circuit 3.340 km (2.075 mi)

GP2 Series

Feature race
- Date: 27 May 2016
- Laps: 40

Pole position
Driver	(Russia) Sergey Sirotkin	ART Grand Prix
- Time: 1:19.186

Podium
First	(Russia) Artem Markelov	Russian Time
Second	(France) Norman Nato	Racing Engineering
Third	(United Kingdom) Oliver Rowland	MP Motorsport

Fastest lap
Driver	(Russia) Artem Markelov	Russian Time
- Time: 1:22.017 (on lap 34)

Sprint race
- Date: 28 May 2016
- Laps: 30

Podium
First	(Japan) Nobuharu Matsushita	ART Grand Prix
Second	(Germany) Marvin Kirchhöfer	Carlin
Third	(Italy) Raffaele Marciello	Russian Time

Fastest lap
Driver	(Japan) Nobuharu Matsushita	ART Grand Prix
- Time: 1:21.554 (on lap 28)

The 2016 Monaco GP2 Series round was a pair of motor races held on 27 and 28 May 2016 at the Circuit de Monaco, Monte Carlo, Monaco, as part of the GP2 Series. It was the fourth round of the 2016 GP2 Series and was run in support of the 2016 Monaco Grand Prix. The first race, a 40-lap feature event, was won by Russian Time driver Artem Markelov after starting from 15th position. Norman Nato finished in second for Racing Engineering and MP Motorsport's Oliver Rowland took third. Nobuharu Matsushita for ART Grand Prix won the following day's 30-lap sprint race from pole position with Carlin's Marvin Kirchhöfer and Markelov's teammate Raffaele Marciello second and third.

Sergey Sirotkin won the pole position for the feature race by posting the fastest lap in qualifying but a slow start off the grid allowed Nato into the lead. Nato pulled away from the rest of the field and led for the majority of the race until a virtual safety car caught him out in the event's closing laps. Markelov was the main beneficiary of this and he made his mandatory pit stop to change tyres on the penultimate lap and held off Nato to take his maiden GP2 Series win. Matsushita started from pole position in the sprint race and repelled a challenge from the fast-starting Kirchhöfer to his right at the start. In a processional race, Matsushita opened out a 13.6 second lead over Kirchhöfer to win for the second time in GP2.

The results of the round meant Nato took the lead of the Drivers' Championship by one point over feature race winner Markelov. Alex Lynn maintained third place with 41 points with Pierre Gasly and Marciello fourth and fifth. In the Teams' Championship, Russian Time moved from fourth to first and Racing Engineering were eleven points behind but they retained second place. The leaders of the Teams' Championship enterin the event DAMS dropped to third while Prema Racing fell to fourth with eight rounds left in the season.

== Background ==
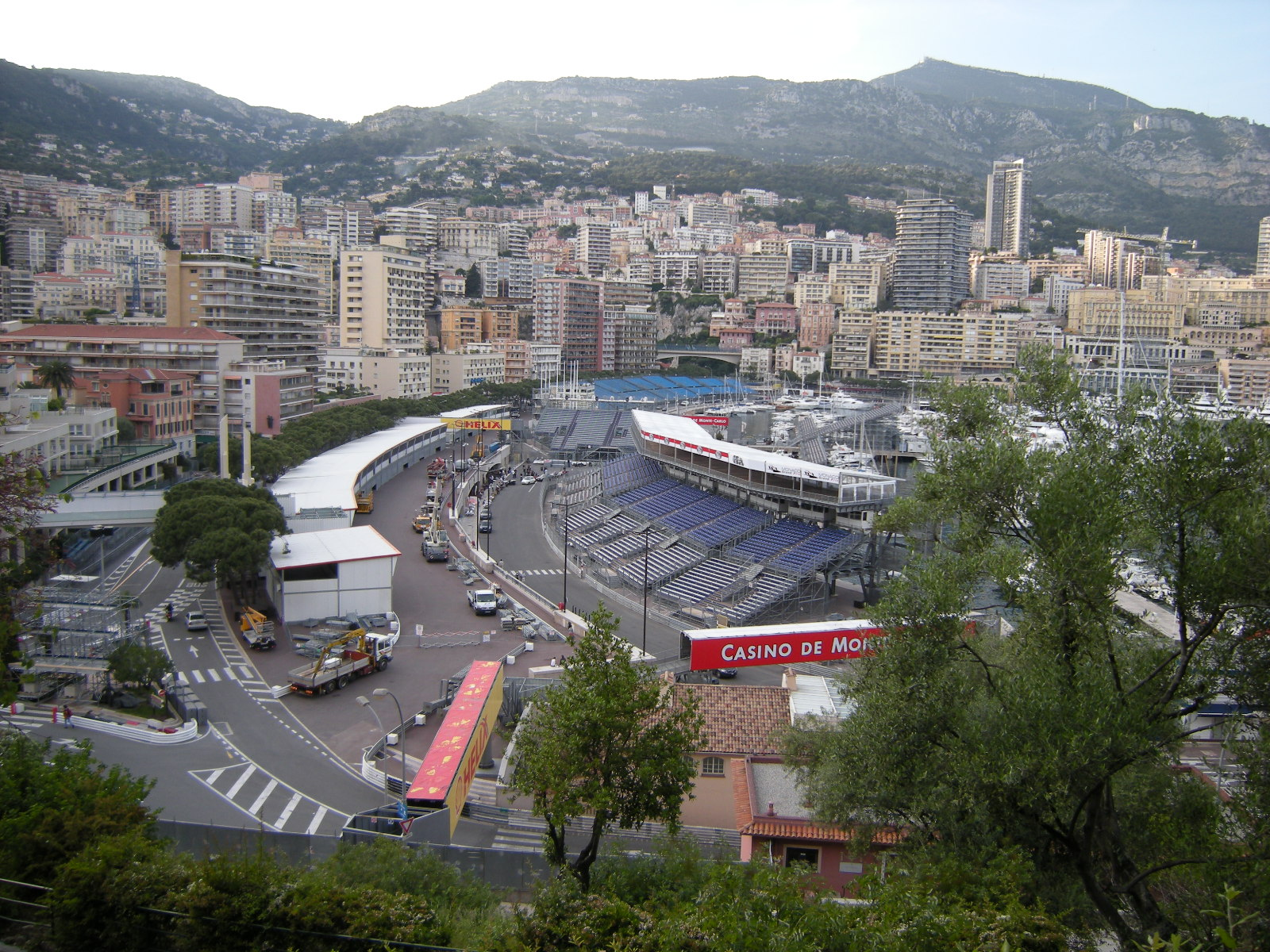
Circuit de Monaco, where the race was held

The 2016 Monaco GP2 Series round was the second of eleven scheduled events of the 2016 GP2 Series season. It was held on 27 and 28 May 2016 at the Circuit de Monaco in Monaco and supported the 2016 Monaco Grand Prix. Tyre supplier Pirelli brought two types of tyre to the race: two dry compounds (super soft "options" and soft "primes"). The drag reduction system (DRS) had one activation zone for the race: on the start/finish straight linking Anthony Noghes and Sainte Devote turns. There were 11 teams of 2 drivers each entered for the race for a total of 22 participants and each driver used the Dallara GP2/11 vehicle.

Before the race, Prema Racing driver Pierre Gasly led the Drivers' Championship with 33 points, seven ahead of Norman Nato of Racing Engineering in second, who in turn, was a further four points in front of third-placed Alex Lynn for Russian Time. DAMS' Nicholas Latifi and Russian Time racer Artem Markelov were both tied for fourth with 20 points each. DAMS and Racing Engineering jointly led the Teams' Championship with 43 points each; Prema Racing stood in third position with 31 points and held a one-point gap over the fourth-placed Russian Time. Carlin were fifth with ten points.

== Practice and qualifying ==
One 45-minute practice session was held on Thursday. The start of the session was moved forward five minutes following repairs to a drain cover that was dislodged during the first Monaco Grand Prix practice session by Nico Rosberg and struck by Jenson Button. Sergey Sirotkin (ART Grand Prix) was fastest with a lap of 1:20.361, almost one-tenth of a second faster than Nato in second. Lynn, Arthur Pic, Jordan King (Racing Engineering), Mitch Evans (Campos Racing), Gasly, Raffaele Marciello (Russian Time), Oliver Rowland (MP Motorsport) and Markelov occupied positions three to ten. Gasly ran wide at Sainte Devote corner, colliding with an outside barrier, and removing his front-left wheel. The virtual safety car (VSC) system was enabled to allow marshals to extricate his car from the track. Soon after, Nobuharu Matsushita (ART Grand Prix) locked his tyres on the run to the same corner and went straight into the wall. Daniël de Jong (MP Motorsport) oversteered into the Sainte Devote barrier and Sean Gelael (Campos Racing) ended the session early when he stalled his car and triggered a traffic holdup.

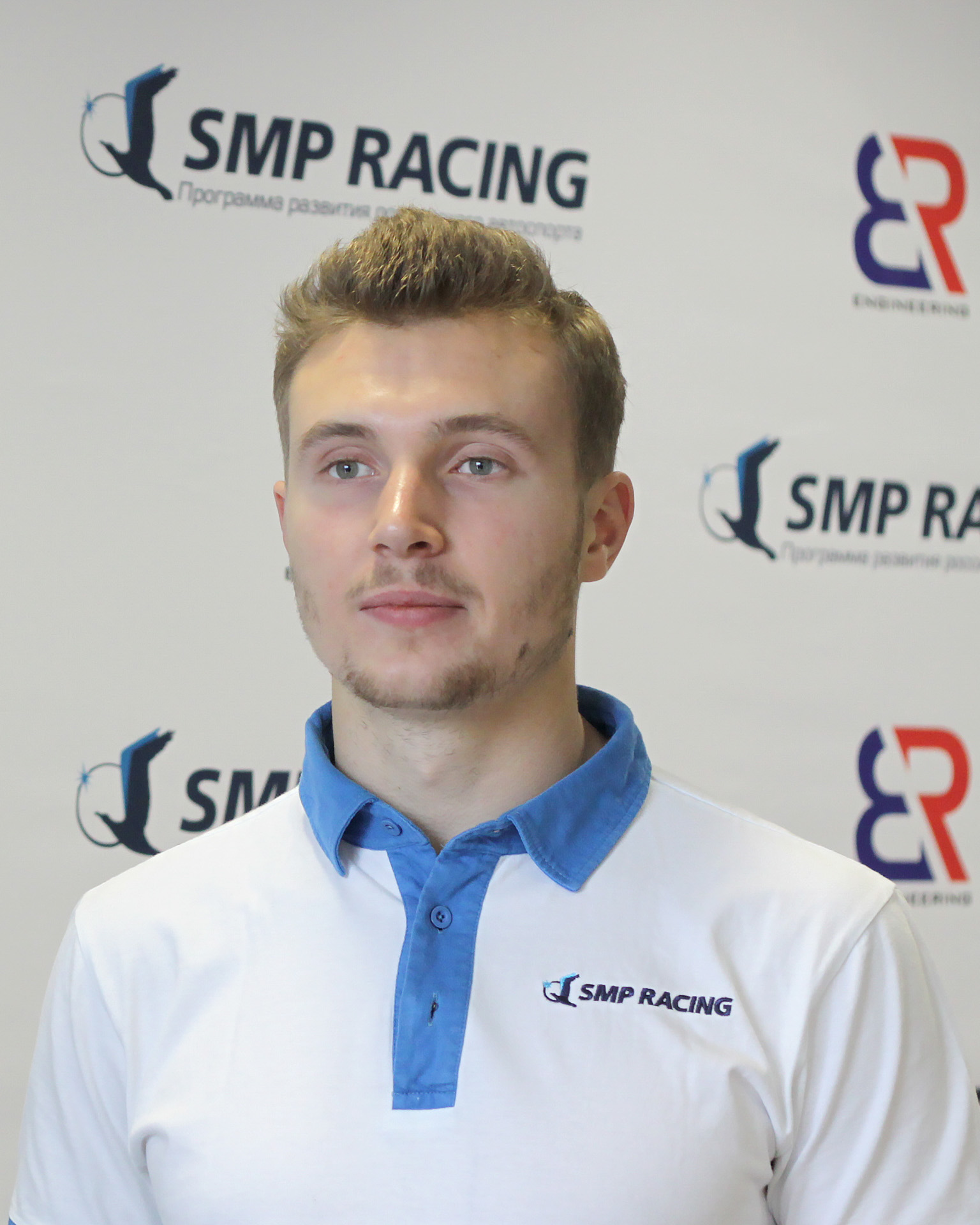
Sergey Sirotkin (pictured in 2017) had the first GP2 Series pole position of his career.

Thursday's afternoon's qualifying session ran for 30 minutes. Qualifying was divided into two groups of 13 cars to avoid overcrowding. Odd numbered vehicles were drawn in Group A and the even numbered cars were put in Group B. The drivers' fastest lap times determined the starting order for the first race. The pole position winner took four points for the Drivers' and Teams' Championships. The second group was competitive because eight drivers temporarily claimed pole position. Sirtokin clinched his maiden GP2 Series pole position with a time of 1:19.186, which was recorded in the session's closing period. He was joined on the grid's front row by Nato whose lap was seven-tenths of a second slower in the final seconds of Group A. Nato's teammate King qualified in third, Evans fourth, and Rowland fifth. Lynn, Antonio Giovinazzi (Prema Racing), Marciello, Latifi and Luca Ghiotto (Trident) rounded out the top ten qualifiers.

Pic was the fastest driver not to qualify in the top ten; his fastest time was nearly 1.2 seconds off Sirotkin's pace. He was followed by Matsushita and Marvin Kirchhöfer (Carlin) and Gelael in 12th to 14th. 15th-place qualifier Markelov misjudged his approach to Sainte Devote corner, locked his car's tyres, went airborne after driving over the indie kerbing and ran straight into a barrier. The wall was separated into two halves, stopping the session for 20 minutes while it was repaired. Markelov was unhurt. Gustav Malja (Rapax), Philo Paz Armand (Trident), de Jong and Jimmy Eriksson (Arden International) filled positions 16 to 19. Gasly had a car brake failure and entered the pit lane but missed the weighbridge when requested to enter the area. Gasly was required to start the feature event from the pit lane. Sergio Canamasas (Carlin) was judged to have made the same error and Nabil Jeffri (Arden International) was observed to block Markelov and both drivers were required to start from the pit lane. Jeffri could not take his penalty as he qualified 22nd. Since he could not take his three-place grid penalty, Jeffri began from the pit lane.

=== Qualifying classification ===
Group A

Final Group A qualifying classification
Pos.	No.	Driver	Team	Time	Grid
1	3	(France) Norman Nato	Racing Engineering	1:19.894	2
2	7	(New Zealand) Mitch Evans	Pertamina Campos Racing	1:19.962	4
3	5	(United Kingdom) Alex Lynn	DAMS	1:20.014	6
4	9	(Italy) Raffaele Marciello	Russian Time	1:20.601	8
5	16	(Italy) Luca Ghiotto	Trident	1:20.630	10
6	1	(Japan) Nobuharu Matsushita	ART Grand Prix	1:20.744	12
7	19	(Germany) Marvin Kirchhöfer	Carlin	1:21.016	13
8	21	(France) Pierre Gasly	Prema Racing	1:21.381	PL^{1}
9	11	(Sweden) Gustav Malja	Rapax	1:21.965	16
10	23	(Netherlands) Daniël de Jong	MP Motorsport	1:21.978	18
11	25	(Sweden) Jimmy Eriksson	Arden International	1:22.029	19

Group B

Final Group B qualifying classification
Pos.	No.	Driver	Team	Time	Grid
1	2	(Russia) Sergey Sirotkin	ART Grand Prix	1:19.186	1
2	4	(United Kingdom) Jordan King	Racing Engineering	1:19.691	3
3	22	(United Kingdom) Oliver Rowland	MP Motorsport	1:19.852	5
4	20	(Italy) Antonio Giovinazzi	Prema Racing	1:19.972	7
5	6	(Canada) Nicholas Latifi	DAMS	1:20.182	9
6	12	(France) Arthur Pic	Rapax	1:20.360	11
7	18	(Spain) Sergio Canamasas	Carlin	1:20.600	PL^{1}
8	8	(Indonesia) Sean Gelael	Pertamina Campos Racing	1:20.877	14
9	10	(Russia) Artem Markelov	Russian Time	1:22.160	15
10	14	(Indonesia) Philo Paz Armand	Trident	1:22.707	17
11	24	(Malaysia) Nabil Jeffri	Arden International	1:22.722	PL^{2}

Notes

- ^1 — Pierre Gasly and Sergio Canamasas started from the pit lane having failed to stop at the scrutineering weighbridge.
- ^2 — Nabil Jeffri received a three-place grid penalty after being found guilty of impeding Artem Markelov during Group B's qualifying session. However, since Jeffri could not take his penalty in full, he started from the pit lane.

== Races ==
The first race was held over 140 km (87 mi) or 60 minutes (which ever came first) and the regulations required drivers to make one pit stop. The first ten finishers scored points, with two given to the fastest lap holder. The grid for the second race was determined by the finishing order of the first but with the first eight drivers in reverse order of where they finished. It was run for 100 km (62 mi) or 45 minutes (which ever came first) and, in contrast to the first race, drivers were not required to make pit stops. The top eight finishers earned points towards their respective championships.

=== Feature race ===
The race started in warm weather of 22 °C (72 °F) and a track temperature of 34 °C (93 °F) at 11:15 Central European Summer Time (CEST) (UTC+2) on 27 May. Sirotkin made a slow start, allowing fellow front-row starter Nato to brake later than him and claim the lead into Sainte Devote corner. Sirtokin then repelled a challenge from King over second place. The field avoided incident on the first lap and the top three of Sirotkin, Nato and King pulled away from the fourth-placed Evans over the next few laps. On lap six, the first mandatory pit stops to change tyres were made by Giovinazzi, Ghiotto, Pic and Kirchhöfer in the lower end of the order. Meanwhile, Nato set consecutive fastest laps to give himself a lead of 1.2 seconds over Sirotkin at the start of lap 10. King was distanced by Nato and Sirotkin by lap 11 as Sirotkin made an error and cut the Novelle Chicane, losing time. Rowland was challenging the slower Evans who straight-lined the Novelle Chicane at the exit of the tunnel to keep the position. Evans was subsequently issued a five-second time penalty on the 20th lap after the stewards deemed him to have gained an illegal advantage.

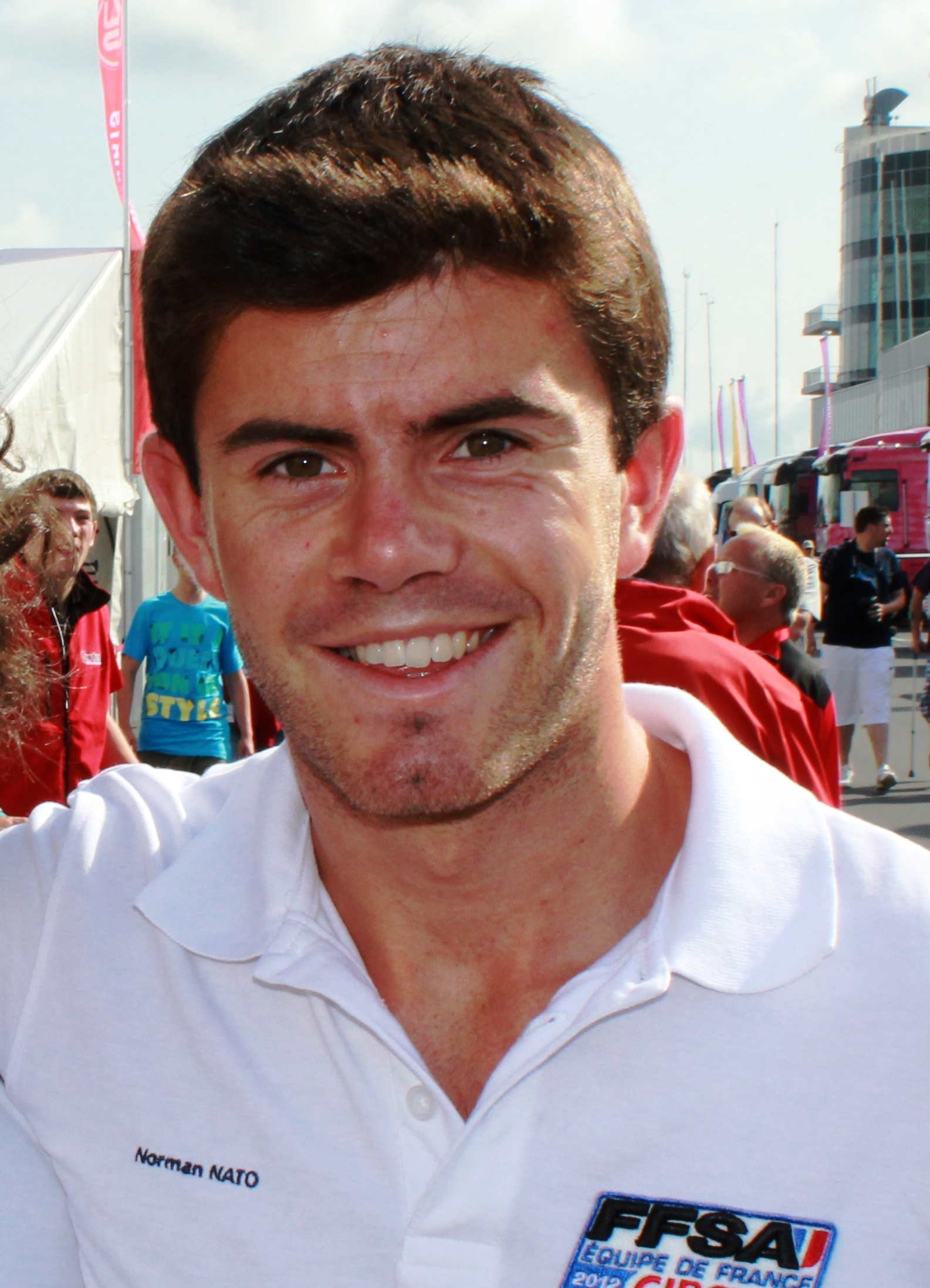
Norman Nato (pictured in 2012) came second after he lost the feature race win to Artem Markelov in the last ten laps of the event.

Meanwhile, another VSC was triggered on lap 18 when Gasly was trying to recover ground and mounted the back of Eriksson's car at La Racasse corner, which would ultimately result in Eriksson's retirement and debris was left on the track. Gasly was consequently forced to enter the pit lane to have his front wing replaced. The VSC was soon lifted after the debris was cleared from the circuit. At the restart, Rowland quickly displaced Evans and charged after the leading trio of Nato, Sirotkin and King. More drama came on lap 23 when Latifi was battling Markelov for seventh and got distracted. This caused Latifi to clip the barrier alongside the circuit in the tunnel and retired in the pit lane with a bent front-left suspension. This allowed Markelov to run without aerodynamic turbulence affecting him and set a string of laps that were similar to that set by the race leaders. Then, as Sirotkin was quickly catching Nato, his car got into an uncontrolled sideways manoeuvre after clipping the kerb too hard at the exit of La Piscine turn and hit the wall for the second successive feature race. Another VSC was activated to allow for general cleanup and racing resumed on lap 24. On the next lap, a third VSC was required when Jeffri crashed at La Rascasse corner. The VSC was lifted on lap 26. Competitive action lasted for three laps until a fourth VSC came about after King struck the barrier; he drove to the pit lane to retire.

Markelov moved into the lead when Lynn, Rowland and Evans pitted over laps 29 and 31 as Nato's pit crew were slow installing his front-right wheel. Markelow set faster lap times than anyone else despite being on heavily worn tyres. The VSC was used twice more for separate incidents that Ghiotto caused on lap 36 as he left debris on the racing line and hit the inside barrier at the Loews hairpin. Markelov was the main beneficiary of this as he was 15 seconds ahead of Nato. He was quicker than Nato in the tunnel and Tabac turn while his rivals' pace was limited since they were slower in the tighter corners. After the restart, Markelov made his mandatory pit stop on lap 39 to switch onto the super soft tyres, emerging just ahead of Nato who could not overtake Markelov on his out-lap. Because the five VSCs elongated the race, the number of laps was lowered to 40 from 42. Markelov's fresher tyres allowed him to hold off Nato in the last two laps for his maiden GP2 Series victory by 1.5 seconds. Third was Rowland and the rest of the provisional order consisting of Lynn, Evans, Marciello, Giovinazzi, Kirchhöfer, Matsushita, de Jong, Pic, Canamasas, Gelael, Malja, Gasly and Armand. There were five deployments of the VSC during the race. After the race, Giovinazzi and Malja received five-second time penalties for illegally cutting the Novelle Chicane and Sainte Devote corner, respectively, handing the sprint race pole position from Kirchhöfer to Matsushita.

==== Feature race classification ====
Drivers who scored championship points are denoted in bold.

Final feature race classification
Pos.	No.	Driver	Team	Laps	Time/Retired	Grid	Points
1	10	(Russia) **Artem Markelov**	**Russian Time**	40	1:01:27.183	15	25 (2)
2	3	(France) **Norman Nato**	**Racing Engineering**	40	+1.541	2	18
3	22	(United Kingdom) **Oliver Rowland**	**MP Motorsport**	40	+3.187	5	15
4	5	(United Kingdom) **Alex Lynn**	**DAMS**	40	+8.239	6	12
5	7	(New Zealand) **Mitch Evans**	**Pertamina Campos Racing**	40	+11.723	4	10
6	9	(Italy) **Raffaele Marciello**	**Russian Time**	40	+15.025	8	8
7	19	(Germany) **Marvin Kirchhöfer**	**Carlin**	40	+21.153	13	6
8	1	(Japan) **Nobuharu Matsushita**	**ART Grand Prix**	40	+21.582	12	4
9	23	(Netherlands) **Daniel de Jong**	**MP Motorsport**	40	+22.343	18	2
10	12	(France) **Arthur Pic**	**Rapax**	40	+23.333	11	1
11	20	(Italy) Antonio Giovinazzi	Prema Racing	40	+25.037	7^{3}	
12	18	(Spain) Sergio Canamasas	Carlin	40	+30.192	PL	
13	8	(Indonesia) Sean Gelael	Pertamina Campos Racing	40	+31.295	14	
14	11	(Sweden) Gustav Malja	Rapax	40	+39.900	16^{3}	
15	21	(France) Pierre Gasly	Prema Racing	40	+49.718	PL	
16	14	(Indonesia) Philo Paz Armand	Trident	39	+1 Lap	17	
Ret	15	(Italy) Luca Ghiotto	Trident	35	Engine	10	
Ret	25	(Sweden) Jimmy Eriksson	Arden International	32	Accident damage	19	
Ret	4	(United Kingdom) Jordan King	Racing Engineering	27	Suspension	3	
Ret	24	(Malaysia) Nabil Jeffri	Arden International	23	Accident	PL	
Ret	2	(Russia) **Sergey Sirotkin**	**ART Grand Prix**	22	Accident	1	(4)
Ret	6	(Canada) Nicholas Latifi	DAMS	21	Suspension	9	
Fastest lap: (Russia) Artem Markelov (Russian Time) – 1:22.017 (on lap 34)

Notes

- **^3** — Antonio Giovinazzi and Gustav Malja received a five-second time penalty for gaining an advantage by way of leaving the circuit.

=== Sprint race ===
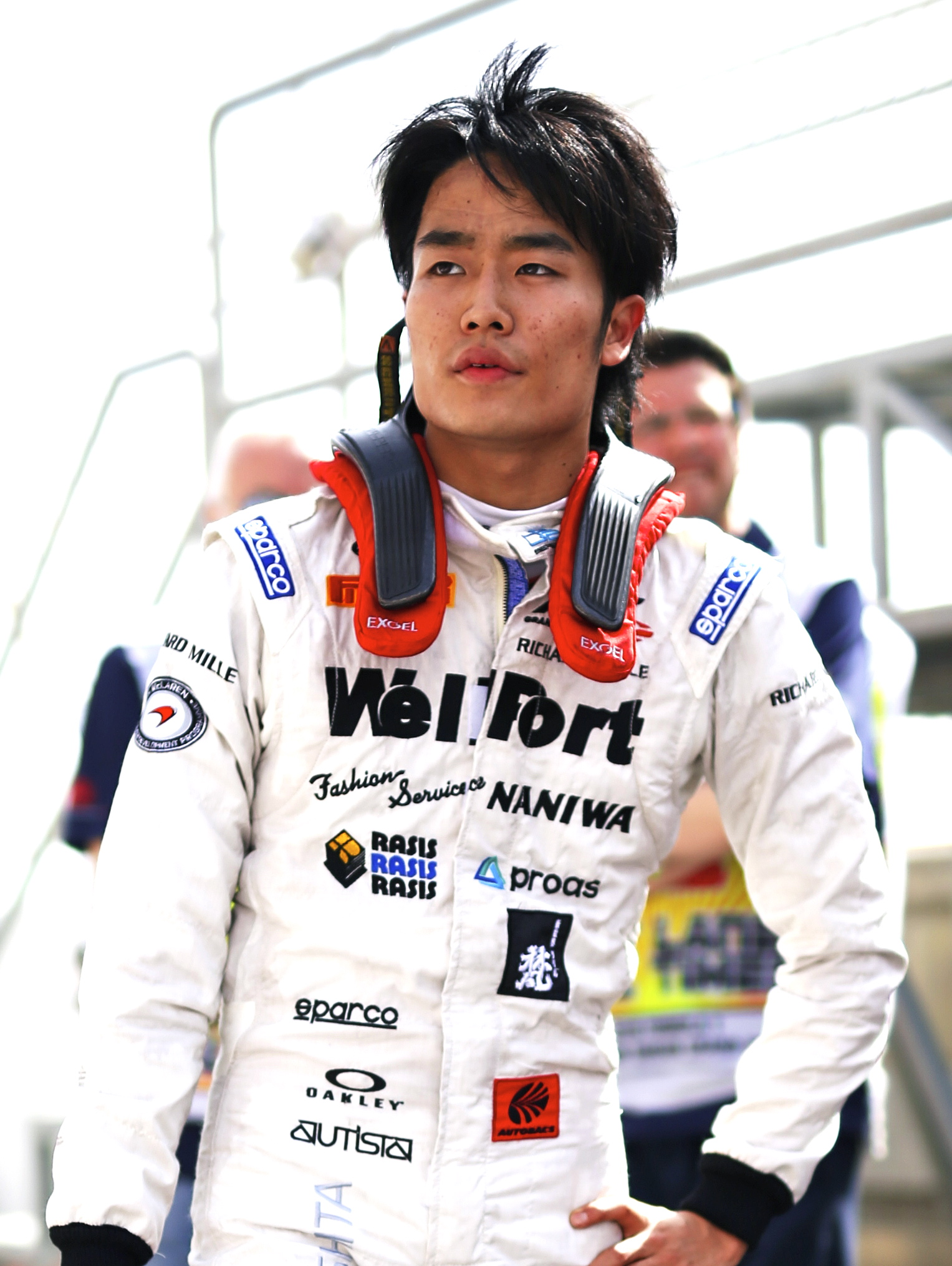
Nobuharu Matsushita (pictured in 2015) won his second career victory in the GP2 Series by 13,6 seconds over Marvin Kirchhöfer.

The second event began in a warm air temperature of 21 °C (70 °F) and a track temperature of 35 °C (95 °F) at 16:10 local time on 28 May. Sirtokin's team changed the monocoque on his car after his crash in the feature race. On the grid, Matsushita had a slow initial getaway and the second-placed Kirchhöfer was faster and drew alongside into Sainte Devote corner. However, Kirchhöfer did not move into the lead as Matsushita held him off by staying on the right and out-braking him. Behind the duo, Maricello went defensive against the fast-starting Evans and Nato went to the outside of Rowland to overtake him but he could not pass Lynn as the field were approaching Casino corner. From there on, the race settled into a rhythm as Matsushita opened his lead over Kirchhöfer to three seconds. Yellow flags were briefly waved by course officials on the fourth lap as King was about to pass Armand for 18th but he left the latter without enough space to get by and put him into a wall at the Loews hairpin. King incurred a five-second time penalty for causing the incident. On lap nine, further disruption was caused when Gelael slid wide at Sainte Devote and crashed into a barrier which activated the VSC.

Sirotkin's poor season continued when the on-board fire extinguisher in his car was activated by debris from his tyre at the entry to Massenet turn on the 11th lap. Sirotkin's visibility was greatly hindered by foam on his visor and he stopped on the escape road at Casino Square corner and retired. At the front, Kirchhöfer took a second out of Matsushita's lead under the VSC only for the latter to respond by being six seconds by lap 15. It further grew as the race progressed and Kirchhöfer was left to holding off third-placed Maricello. Nato and Matsushita traded the fastest lap as the laps passed by with the accolade being claimed by Matsushita on lap 28 with a time of 1:21.554 and earned him two championship points. In a processional race, it was Matsushita's victory, achieving his second win in the GP2 Series after the 2015 Hungaroring feature race, and ensuring four different drivers had won all four of the season's races held at the time. Kirchhöfer finished 13.660 seconds later in second in Carlin's first podium since Felipe Nasr at the 2014 Abu Dhabi Sprint race and Maricello completed the podium in third. Off the podium, Evans took fourth and fifth-placed Alex Lynn led a pack of cars comprising Nato, Rowland and Markelov who were covered by 1.3 seconds in positions six through eight. The final classified finishers were Pic, Canamasas, de Jong, Malja, Gasly, Ghiotto, Eriksson, King, Jeffri and Giovinazzi who stalled on the grid.

==== Sprint race classification ====
Drivers who scored championship points are denoted in bold.

Final sprint race classification
Pos.	No.	Driver	Team	Laps	Time/Retired	Grid	Points
1	1	(Japan) **Nobuharu Matsushita**	**ART Grand Prix**	30	41:59.392	1	15 (2)
2	19	(Germany) **Marvin Kirchhöfer**	**Carlin**	30	+13.660	2	12
3	9	(Italy) **Raffaele Marciello**	**Russian Time**	30	+15.453	3	10
4	7	(New Zealand) **Mitch Evans**	**Pertamina Campos Racing**	30	+20.894	4	8
5	5	(United Kingdom) **Alex Lynn**	**DAMS**	30	+32.560	5	6
6	3	(France) **Norman Nato**	**Racing Engineering**	30	+33.058	7	4
7	22	(United Kingdom) **Oliver Rowland**	**MP Motorsport**	30	+33.594	6	2
8	10	(Russia) **Artem Markelov**	**Russian Time**	30	+33.874	8	1
9	12	(France) Arthur Pic	Rapax	30	+36.777	10	
10	18	(Spain) Sergio Canamasas	Carlin	30	+47.646	12	
11	23	(Netherlands) Daniël de Jong	MP Motorsport	30	+54.291	9	
12	11	(Sweden) Gustav Malja	Rapax	30	+55.476	14	
13	21	(France) Pierre Gasly	Prema Racing	30	+55.981	15	
14	15	(Italy) Luca Ghiotto	Trident	30	+56.501	17	
15	25	(Sweden) Jimmy Eriksson	Arden International	30	+58.682	20	
16	4	(United Kingdom) Jordan King	Racing Engineering	30	+1:19.193	21	
17	24	(Malaysia) Nabil Jeffri	Arden International	30	+1:27.922	22	
18	20	(Italy) Antonio Giovinazzi	Prema Racing	30	+1:27.997	11	
Ret	6	(Canada) Nicholas Latifi	DAMS	13	Gearbox	22	
Ret	2	(Russia) Sergey Sirotkin	ART Grand Prix	10	Extinguisher	21	
Ret	8	(Indonesia) Sean Gelael	Pertamina Campos Racing	7	Accident	13	
Ret	14	(Indonesia) Philo Paz Armand	Trident	3	Accident	16	
Fastest lap: (Japan) Nobuharu Matsushita (ART Grand Prix) – 1:21.554 (on lap 28)

== Post-round ==
The top three drivers in both races appeared on the podium to collect their trophies and spoke to the media in separate press conferences. Markelov was delighted to achieve his first win and stayed on the soft compound tyres because his team deemed their pace decent, "We really did a good job together. To finish P1 in Monaco and score my first victory in GP2, it’s amazing... I don’t have any other words. I’m really happy." Nato, who came second, stated that he was displeased and angry over seeing Markelov take the lead as he did not feel the need to change tyres and was urged by his engineer to pressure him, "I tried to overtake him before Turn 5 and when I saw I couldn’t do it, I just focused on the end of the race. P2 is better than nothing. This race was for us today but it’s still good points for the team and the drivers’ standings." Rowland said he was pleased to finish third and complimented his team, "It was a pretty good day. It was just a bit strange when Artem came out first. I didn’t expect that!"

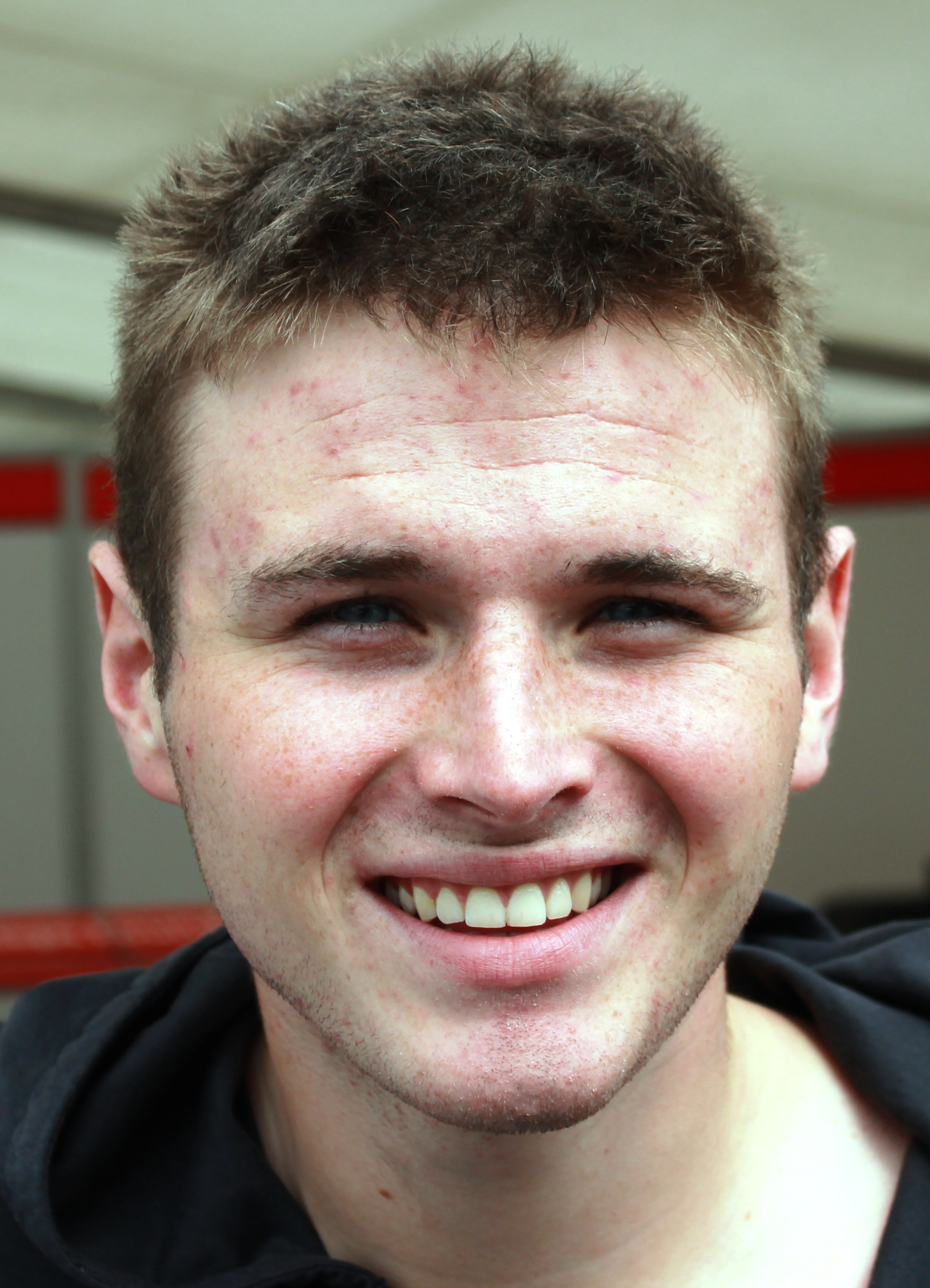
Oliver Rowland (pictured in 2016) took the first podium of his GP2 Series career with a third-place finish in the feature race.

After the sprint race, Matsushita called his Monaco sprint race victory "even more special" than other circuits and said tyre degradation was low as he focused on the race, "I’m happy to come home with a trophy, a victory here and some good points for the team. It was my first win in Monaco so it feels special. I led the whole race, I felt good in the car so I’m just really happy." Kirchhöfer spoke of his enjoyment racing at Monaco for the first time and had not anticipated achieving a podium result at the track, "I’m really happy with P2. I had a good gateway at the start but I couldn’t overtake Matsushita at the first corner. After that, I was thinking to bring the car home. But we are all happy, me and the team, with this result. There’s more to come!" Third-placed Marciello called his race "boring" because he found it difficult to overtake Kirchhöfer and hoped for a safety car or an extended VSC. Nevertheless, he said he was still happy and wanted to continue the form into the Baku round, "It’s still a good weekend with Artem’s P1 yesterday and my podium today but we need to improve during the qualifying. Our car is really good in the long runs and we have good pace. So our goal is to improve during the qualifying session."

The technical director of Racing Engineering Sébastien Viger explained his team visited the stewards for several hours after the feature race to understand how Nato lost the chance to win, "This showed how wrong things went for us with the multiple virtual safety cars. Basically, Markelov was very lucky as he took the VSC on slow zones [of the track] where he was not losing time and Norman and others took it on fast zones, which resulted in huge time losses." Despite the VSC allowing Markelov to increase his advantage, Svetlana Strelnikova, the team principal of Russian Time, said she felt they were within the regulations, "We led by 15 seconds [over Nato], but the question is 'where did the other 15 seconds come that we could stop and rejoin first?'. But there was VSC – six seconds to turn it off, six seconds to turn it on, and each driver reacts in a different way – they press the button at the moment that the engineer says on the radio and the car is running full speed again." Valentin Khorounzhiy of motorsport.com wrote that the changes in gap were unlikely to account for Markelov's reaction time but for where on the track the VSC was activated as some drivers slowed to a different extent. He noted suggestions of protesting Markelov's victory would be unsuccessful.

Nato left Monaco as the leader of the Drivers' Championship with 49 points and Markelov's feature race victory moved him to second with just one point separating the two. Lynn's results allowed him to maintain third with 41 points while previous championship leader Gasly fell to fourth with 33 and Marciello was fifth with 28. In the Teams' Championship, Russian Time moved from fourth to take the lead with 76 points and Racing Engineering retained second with 65 points. DAMS' results dropped them to third while Prema Racing maintained their hold on fourth. Carlin were still in fifth with eight rounds left in the season.

== Standings after the round ==
Drivers' Championship standings

+/–	Pos	Driver	Points
1	1	(France) Norman Nato	49
3	2	(Russia) Artem Markelov	48
	3	(United Kingdom) Alex Lynn	41
3	4	(France) Pierre Gasly	33
2	5	(Italy) Raffaele Marciello	28

Teams' Championship standings

+/–	Pos	Driver	Points
3	1	(Russia) Russian Time	76
	2	(Spain) Racing Engineering	65
2	3	(France) DAMS	61
1	4	(Italy) Prema Racing	33
	5	(United Kingdom) Carlin	28

- Note: Only the top five positions are included for both sets of standings.

Previous round: 2016 Catalunya GP2 Series round	GP2 Series; 2016 season	Next round: 2016 Baku GP2 Series round
Previous round: 2015 Monaco GP2 Series round	Monaco GP2 round	Next round: 2017 Monaco Formula 2 round
