= Dallara SN01 =

Open-wheel formula racing car built by Dallara

Dallara SN01 (Dallara T02)
- Category: World Series by Nissan
- Constructor: Dallara
- Designer: Giampaolo Dallara
- Predecessor: Coloni CN1
- Successor: Dallara T05

Technical specifications
- Chassis: Carbon fiber and Kevlar with nomex honeycomb monocoque
- Length: 4,550 mm (179 in)
- Width: 1,900 mm (75 in)
- Height: 949 mm (37.4 in)
- Axle track: Front: 1,600 mm (63 in); Rear: 1,550 mm (61 in)
- Wheelbase: 3,000 mm (120 in)
- Engine: Mid-engine, longitudinally mounted, 2,987 cubic centimetres (3.0 litres; 182.3 cubic inches), Nissan VQ30DE, 90° V6, DOHC, NA
- Transmission: Ricardo 6-speed sequential manual
- Power: 410–420 hp (306–313 kW); 505 N⋅m (372 lb⋅ft)
- Weight: 565 kg (1,246 lb) (645 kg (1,422 lb) including driver)

Competition history
- Debut: 2002 Ricardo Tormo World Series by Nissan round
- Last event: 2004 Jerez World Series by Nissan round
Races	Wins	Poles	F/Laps
54	54	54	54
- Constructors' Championships: Racing Engineering (2002); Gabord Competición (2003); Pons Racing (2004)
- Drivers' Championships: Ricardo Zonta (2002); Franck Montagny (2003); Heikki Kovalainen (2004)

The Dallara SN01, also known as the Dallara T02, is an open-wheel ground effect formula racing car, designed, developed and built by Italian manufacturer and constructor Dallara, for the one-make World Series by Nissan spec-series, between 2002 and 2004. It was powered by a naturally-aspirated, 3.0 L (180 cu in), Nissan VQ engine, producing between 410–420 hp (310–310 kW). The car weighed 565 kg (1,246 lb) without driver, and about 645 kg (1,422 lb) with the driver. It was later succeeded by the Dallara T05, in 2005.
