= Franck Montagny =

French racing driver (born 1978)

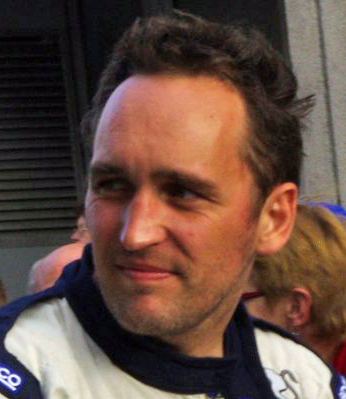
- Montagny at the 2011 24 Hours of Le Mans driver parade
- Nationality: (France) French
- Born: 5 January 1978 (age 48) Feurs, Loire, France

Formula E career
- Debut season: 2014–15
- Categorisation: FIA Platinum
- Car number: 27
- Former teams: Andretti Autosport
- Starts: 2
- Championships: 0
- Wins: 0
- Podiums: 1
- Poles: 0
- Fastest laps: 0
- Best finish: 16th (18 pts) in 2014–15
- Finished last season: 16th

Formula One World Championship career
- Active years: 2006
- Team: Super Aguri
- Entries: 7
- Championships: 0
- Wins: 0
- Podiums: 0
- Career points: 0
- Pole positions: 0
- Fastest laps: 0
- First entry: 2006 European Grand Prix
- Last entry: 2006 French Grand Prix

24 Hours of Le Mans career
- Years: 1998–2002, 2005–2006, 2008–2012
- Teams: Courage Compétition, DAMS, Team Oreca, Pescarolo Sport, Team Peugeot Total
- Best finish: 2nd (2006, 2009)

Franck Montagny (born 5 January 1978) is a French former racing driver. He briefly raced for the Super Aguri Formula One team in 2006.

== Early career ==
Born in Feurs, Loire, Montagny started racing karts there in 1988, winning the cadet class in the French Karting Championship in 1992, and the National 1 class the following year.

Montagny made his debut in cars in 1994, aged sixteen, promptly winning the French Renault Campus championship. The next two years were spent in Formula Renault, with finishes in fourth (the highest-finishing rookie that year) and sixth (despite missing half the season with multiple fractures obtained in an accident at Le Mans) respectively, before transferring up to French Formula Three in 1997 with the La Filière Martini team, debuting with another fourth place championship finish.

== Formula Three breakthrough ==
Montagny had a breakthrough year in Formula Three in 1998, including a pole position at the Spa-Francorchamps race ahead of much more experienced drivers including Mark Webber, Luciano Burti, Enrique Bernoldi and Peter Dumbreck. He repeated the feat in the Zandvoort Masters in the Netherlands later that year, beating then German Formula Three champion Nick Heidfeld. He consistently outpaced long-time teammate Sébastien Bourdais and ended the season with ten wins from 22 races, including twelve pole positions, finishing the championship as runner-up behind David Saelens.

== Formula 3000 and sports cars ==
Montagny moved up to Formula 3000 in 1999, driving for the DAMS team which was falling from its peak by then. One podium finish at the Hungaroring was his main success; he totalled only 6 points and tenth place that season. He however ended the year with success in the Elf Masters Karting at Paris-Bercy.

A repeat of his unsuccessful year in Formula 3000 prompted a move to World Series by Nissan in 2001, signing for the Epsilon by Graff team. Montagny won eight races out of a possible sixteen, and beat Tomas Scheckter to the championship. He changed teams for 2002 to Racing Engineering, but was beaten into second place in the championship by Ricardo Zonta. He supplemented this with a sixth-place finish for Oreca at the Le Mans 24 hours.

== Formula One ==
=== Renault and Jordan ===
Montagny returned to the World Series by Nissan in 2003 with Gabord Competicion, and secured his second championship title with nine victories, ahead of Heikki Kovalainen. This performance earned him a test with the Renault Formula One team, in which he impressed sufficiently to earn a contract as a test driver in 2003, moving up to become third driver during the 2004 & 2005 seasons. He did an impressive one-off for Jordan as third driver on the Friday of the 2005 European Grand Prix, clocking a quicker time than Narain Karthikeyan and Tiago Monteiro, the official Jordan drivers.

In mid-2004, as part of his Renault F1 testing duties, Montagny became the chief test and development driver for the new GP2 Series, which would be powered by Renault engines. Montagny was the first driver to take the wheel of the car, and along with former F1 driver and ex-Renault F1 tester and Friday driver Allan McNish, divided testing duties between them, before the GP2 Series was officially launched in 2005. Much of the success of the championship and the drivability of the car has been placed on the development skills of Montagny. This was further evidenced at the start of the 2006 GP2 Series season, when Montagny was called in to test for the newly created FMS International team, to aid them and their drivers in understanding the complexities of the car, at Circuit Ricardo Tormo, Valencia, Spain, where Montagny had put in hundreds of testing laps in his time with Renault F1.

=== Super Aguri ===
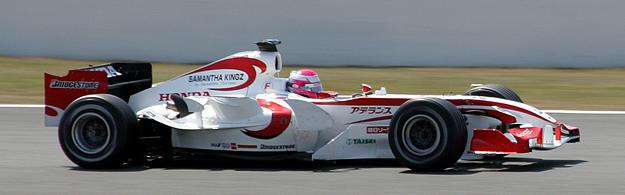
Montagny driving for Super Aguri at the 2006 French Grand Prix.

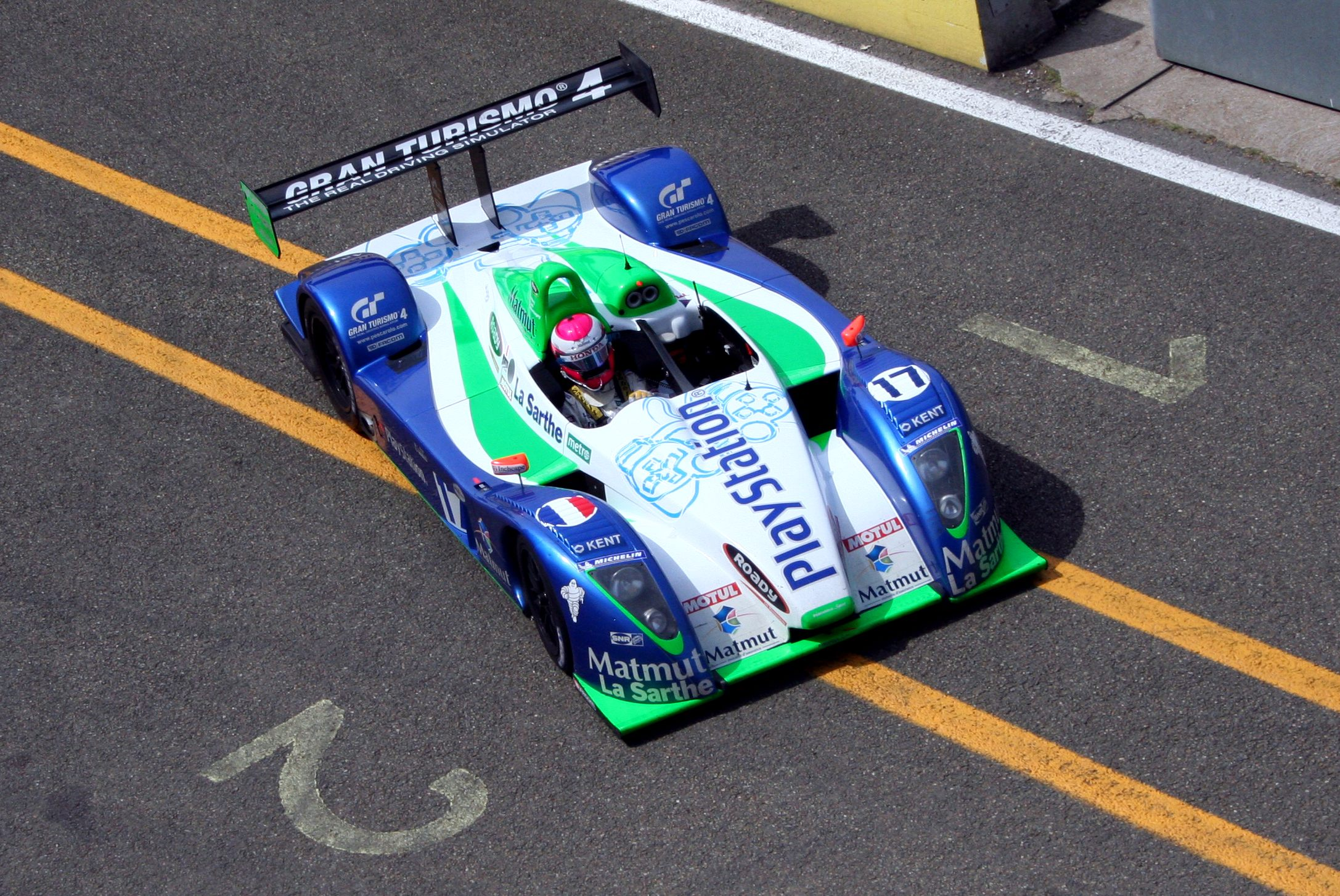
Montagny driving for Pescarolo Sport during practice for the 2006 24 Hours of Le Mans.

For 2006, Super Aguri took Montagny on as third driver; however, he was promoted to full race driver in May after it was announced that Yuji Ide was to drop back into testing; Ide was demoted at the behest of the governing body who considered him insufficiently experienced for Formula One. Montagny hence competed in his first Grand Prix, the 2006 European Grand Prix on 7 May, qualifying last and retiring with a hydraulics problem. He did not finish his second race 2006 Spanish Grand Prix: after a great start, enabling him to gain three positions, he retired on lap 10 with a mechanical failure. It was third time lucky for him at the Monaco Grand Prix, when he finished the 78-lap race in sixteenth place, three laps behind the leader.

During the break between the British Grand Prix and the Canadian Grand Prix, Montagny was able to participate in the Le Mans 24 Hours, finishing second for Pescarolo Sport behind only the dominating Audi factory R10s. He was the first active Formula One driver to also participate at Le Mans in the same year since Mark Blundell in 1995.

On 12 July, Super Aguri announced that Sakon Yamamoto would replace Montagny from the German Grand Prix onwards. Montagny did not appear in his role as third driver for the next two weekends as only two Super Aguri SA06s were available but a third chassis was prepared during the summer break enabling him to reprise this role at the Turkish Grand Prix.

=== Toyota ===
Montagny tested for Toyota F1 in September 2006 at Silverstone. A month later, Toyota confirmed that he would join the team as test driver for the 2007 season, as Olivier Panis and Ricardo Zonta were leaving the team. After spending 2007 as a test driver, Montagny left the team after a test at the Circuit de Catalunya in November. He was still interested in gaining a drive in F1, and had been linked with the Renault F1 team for the 2010 season, but Renault signed Vitaly Petrov.

== After Formula One ==
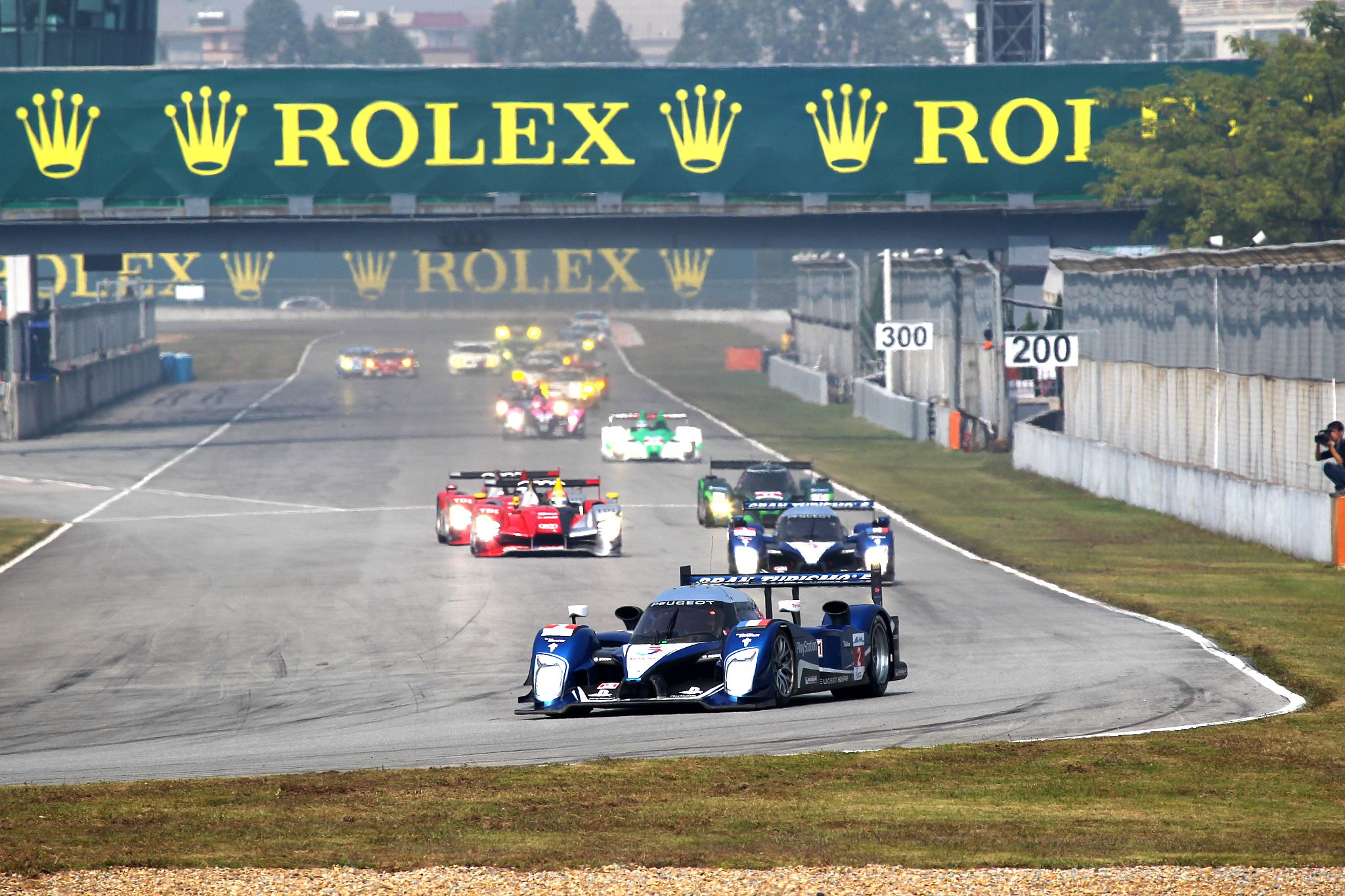
Montagny leads the field at the start of the 2010 1000 km of Zhuhai. He and teammate Stéphane Sarrazin won the race.

Montagny competed in the final Champ Car World Series race, held at the Long Beach circuit on April 20, 2008. He finished second in his first appearance in a race in the United States, five seconds behind Australian Will Power. In June, he drove the Peugeot 908 HDi FAP at the 2008 24 Hours of Le Mans and finished in the third place with Ricardo Zonta and Christian Klien.

Montagny made his debut in the American Le Mans Series with Andretti Green Racing at the 2008 Northeast Grand Prix at Lime Rock Park in July 2008, driving an Acura ARX-01B.

Montagny made his IndyCar Series debut in 2009 at the Indy Grand Prix of Sonoma at Infineon Raceway with Andretti Green Racing.

=== Superleague Formula ===
Montagny has signed up to drive the Girondins de Bordeaux entry in the Superleague Formula for the 2010 season.

=== Formula E ===
In May 2014, Andretti Autosport announced that Montagny would race for them in the inaugural season of the FIA Formula E Championship in 2014–15. He raced for the team in Beijing and Putrajaya, scoring a podium in Beijing and scoring eighteen points overall in the two races. However, he was replaced in Punta del Este by Jean-Éric Vergne. It was not immediately known why, but Montagny later admitted that he tested positive for benzoylecgonine, a cocaine derivative after the Putrajaya ePrix. In March 2015, Montagny was given a two-year ban from racing, and was also disqualified from the Putrajaya race, in which he initially placed fifteenth.

=== Current life ===
Montagny now works as a pit lane summariser and expert for French television.

== Racing record ==
=== Career summary ===
Season	Series	Team name	Races	Poles	Wins	Points	Position
1994	Formula Renault Campus France	?	?	?	3	284	**1st**
1995	Formula Renault France	La Filière	14	0	1	70	4th
1996	Formula Renault France	La Filière	8	0	2	74	6th
1997	French Formula 3 Championship	La Filière	17	1	4	129	4th
1997	British Formula 3 Championship	La Filière	1	0	0	12	18th
1997	Macau Grand Prix	La Filière	1	0	0	N/A	DNF
1997	Masters of Formula 3	La Filière	1	0	0	N/A	14th
1998	French Formula Three	La Filière	22	12	10	226	**2nd**
1998	Le Mans 24 Hours - LMP1	La Filière	1	0	0	N/A	5th
1998	Macau Grand Prix	La Filière	1	0	0	N/A	DNF
1998	Masters of Formula 3	La Filière	1	0	0	N/A	6th
1999	International Formula 3000	DAMS	10	0	0	6	12th
1999	American Le Mans Series - LMP	DAMS	1	0	0	0	NC
1999	Le Mans 24 Hours	DAMS	1	0	0	N/A	DNF
2000	International Formula 3000	DAMS	10	0	0	5	15th
2000	Le Mans 24 Hours	DAMS	1	0	0	N/A	19th
2001	Open Telefónica by Nissan	Epsilon by Graff	18	8	7	221	**1st**
2001	Le Mans 24 Hours	Viper Team Oreca	1	0	0	N/A	DNF
2002	World Series by Nissan	Racing Engineering	18	3	4	222	**2nd**
2002	FIA Sportscar Championship - SR1	Team Oreca	1	0	0	15	15th
2002	Le Mans 24 Hours	Team Oreca	1	0	0	N/A	6th
2003	World Series by Nissan	Gabord Competición	17	4	9	241	**1st**
2004	Formula One	Mild Seven Renault F1 Team	Test driver				
2005	Formula One	Mild Seven Renault F1 Team	Test driver				
2005	Formula One	Jordan Grand Prix	Test driver				
2005	Le Mans 24 Hours	Audi PlayStation Team Oreca	1	0	0	N/A	4th
2006	Formula One	Super Aguri F1	7	0	0	0	27th
2006	Le Mans 24 Hours	Pescarolo Sport	1	0	0	N/A	**2nd**
2007	Formula One	Panasonic Toyota Racing	Test driver				
2007–08	A1 Grand Prix	France	4	0	0	118**	4th**
2008	Champ Car World Series	Forsythe/Pettit Racing	1	0	0	N/A†	N/A†
2008	American Le Mans Series - LMP2	Andretti Green Racing	7	1	2	90	11th
2008	Le Mans 24 Hours	Team Peugeot Total	1	0	0	N/A	**3rd**
2009	IndyCar Series	Andretti Green Racing	1	0	0	12	38th
2009	American Le Mans Series	Team Peugeot Total	2	0	1	56	9th
2009	Le Mans 24 Hours	Team Peugeot Total	1	0	0	N/A	**2nd**
2010	American Le Mans Series - LMP1	Team Peugeot Total	1	0	1	N/A	NC
2010	Le Mans 24 Hours	Team Peugeot Total	1	0	0	N/A	NC
2010	Intercontinental Le Mans Cup	Team Peugeot Total	2	0	2	N/A	NC
2010	Superleague Formula	Girondins de Bordeaux	12	0	1	372**	11th**
2011	American Le Mans Series - LMP1	Peugeot Sport Total	2	0	1	N/A	NC
2011	Le Mans 24 Hours	Peugeot Sport Total	1	0	0	N/A	**3rd**
2012	International V8 Supercars Championship	Kelly Racing	2	0	0	0	NC‡
2012	Le Mans 24 Hours	OAK Racing	1	0	1	N/A	DNF
2014	IndyCar Series	Andretti Autosport	1	0	0	8	36th
2014–15	Formula E	Andretti Autosport Formula E Team	2	0	0	18	16th

** Team standings
† Championship merged into the IndyCar Series after one race.
‡ Not Eligible for points

=== Sportscar racing ===
==== 24 Hours of Le Mans results ====
Year	Team	Co-Drivers	Car	Class	Laps	Pos.	Class Pos.
1998	(France) Courage Compétition	(France) Henri Pescarolo (France) Olivier Grouillard	Courage C36-Porsche	LMP1	304	15th	4th
1999	(France) Team DAMS	(France) Christophe Tinseau (France) David Terrien	Lola B98/10-Judd	LMP	77	DNF	DNF
2000	(France) Team DAMS	(France) Éric Bernard (France) Emmanuel Collard	Cadillac Northstar LMP	LMP900	300	19th	9th
2001	(France) Viper Team Oreca	(France) Yannick Dalmas (France) Stéphane Sarrazin	Chrysler LMP	LMP900	126	DNF	DNF
2002	(France) PlayStation Team Oreca	(France) Stéphane Sarrazin (France) Nicolas Minassian	Dallara SP1-Judd	LMP900	359	6th	5th
2005	(France) Audi PlayStation Team Oreca	(France) Jean-Marc Gounon (France) Stéphane Ortelli	Audi R8	LMP1	362	4th	4th
2006	(France) Pescarolo Sport	(France) Sébastien Loeb (France) Éric Hélary	Pescarolo C60 Hybrid-Judd	LMP1	376	**2nd**	**2nd**
2008	(France) Peugeot Sport Total	(Brazil) Ricardo Zonta (Austria) Christian Klien	Peugeot 908 HDi FAP	LMP1	379	**3rd**	**3rd**
2009	(France) Team Peugeot Total	(France) Sébastien Bourdais (France) Stéphane Sarrazin	Peugeot 908 HDi FAP	LMP1	381	**2nd**	**2nd**
2010	(France) Team Peugeot Total	(France) Nicolas Minassian (France) Stéphane Sarrazin	Peugeot 908 HDi FAP	LMP1	264	DNF	DNF
2011	(France) Peugeot Sport Total	(France) Stéphane Sarrazin (France) Nicolas Minassian	Peugeot 908	LMP1	353	**3rd**	**3rd**
2012	(France) OAK Racing	(Austria) Dominik Kraihamer (Belgium) Bertrand Baguette	OAK Pescarolo 01 Evo-Judd	LMP1	219	DNF	DNF

==== Complete American Le Mans Series results ====
Year	Entrant	Class	Chassis	Engine	1	2	3	4	5	6	7	8	9	10	11	12	Rank	Points	Ref
1999	DAMS	LMP	Lola B98/10	Judd GV4 4.0 L V10	SEB	ATL	MOS	SON	POR	PET; Ret	MON	LSV					NC	0	
2000	Motorola DAMS	LMP	Cadillac Northstar LMP	Cadillac Northstar 4.0 L Turbo V8	SEB	CHA	SIL	NÜR; 5	SON	MOS	TEX	ROS	PET	MON	LSV	ADE	40th	20	
2008	Andretti Green Racing	LMP2	Acura ARX-01b	Acura 3.4L V8	SEB	STP	LNB	UTA	LIM; 5	MID; 7	AME; 7	MOS; 4	DET; 1	PET; 7	MON; 1		11th	90	
2009	Team Peugeot Total	LMP1	Peugeot 908 HDi FAP	Peugeot HDi 5.5 L Turbo V12 (Diesel)	SEB; 2	STP	LNB	UTA	LIM	MID	AME	MOS	PET; 1	MON			9th	56	
2010	Team Peugeot Total	LMP1	Peugeot 908 HDi FAP	Peugeot HDi 5.5 L Turbo V12 (Diesel)	SEB	LNB	MON	UTA	LIM	MID	AME	MOS	PET; 1				NC	–	
2011	Peugeot Sport Total	LMP1	Peugeot 908	Peugeot HDi 3.7 L Turbo V8 (Diesel)	SEB; 3	LNB	LIM	MOS	MID	AME	BAL	MON	PET; 1				NC	–	
2012	Level 5 Motorsports	P2	HPD ARX-03b	Honda HR28TT 2.8 L Turbo V6	SEB	LNB	MON; 1	LIM	MOS	MID	AME	BAL	VIR	PET			NC	–	

=== Complete International Formula 3000 results ===
(key)

Year	Entrant	1	2	3	4	5	6	7	8	9	10	DC	Points
1999	DAMS	IMO; 10	MON; 9	CAT; Ret	MAG; 7	SIL; 6	A1R; 12	HOC; 6	HUN; 3	SPA; Ret	NÜR; 9	12th	6
2000	DAMS	IMO; Ret	SIL; 7	CAT; 6	NÜR; Ret	MON; 6	MAG; 4	A1R; 17	HOC; Ret	HUN; 12	SPA; Ret	15th	5

=== Complete Open Telefónica results ===
(key)

Year	Entrant	1	2	3	4	5	6	7	8	9	10	11	12	13	14	15	16	DC	Points
2001	Epsilon by Graff	JAR; 1; 1	**JAR**; **2**; 1	EST; 1; 5	EST; 2; 4	**ALB**; **1**; 9	ALB; 2; 1	VAL1; 1 Ret	**VAL1**; **2**; 1	**MZA**; **1** Ret	**MZA**; **2**; 1	**MAG**; **1**; 1	**MAG**; **2**; 1	CAT; 1; 5	CAT; 2; 1	VAL2; 1; 2	VAL2; 2 Ret	1st	211

=== Complete World Series by Nissan results ===
(key)

Year	Entrant	1	2	3	4	5	6	7	8	9	10	11	12	13	14	15	16	17	18	DC	Points
2002	Racing Engineering	**VAL1**; **1**; 2	**VAL1**; **2**; 1	JAR; 1; 2	JAR; 2; 12	ALB; 1; 5	ALB; 2; 4	MZA; 1; 2	**MZA**; **2**; 1	MAG; 1; 3	MAG; 2; 1	CAT; 1; 5	CAT; 2; 4	VAL2; 1; 7	VAL2; 2; 5	CUR; 1; 6	CUR; 2; 2	INT; 1; 1	INT; 2; 3	2nd	204
2003	Gabord Competición	**JAR1**; **1**; 1	JAR1; 2; 1	**ZOL**; **1** Ret	**ZOL**; **2**; 1	MAG; 1; 1	MAG; 2; 1	MZA; 1; 1	MZA; 2; 13	LAU; 1; 1	LAU; 2; 2	A1R; 1; 7	A1R; 2; 1	**CAT**; **1**; 1	CAT; 2; 5	VAL; 1; 3	VAL; 1 DNS	JAR2; 1 Ret	JAR2; 2 Ret	1st	241

=== Complete Formula One results ===
(key)

Year	Entrant	Chassis	Engine	1	2	3	4	5	6	7	8	9	10	11	12	13	14	15	16	17	18	19	WDC	Points
2003	Mild Seven Renault F1 Team	Renault R23	Renault V10	AUS	MAL	BRA	SMR	ESP	AUT	MON	CAN	EUR	FRA; TD	GBR	GER	HUN	ITA	USA	JPN				–	–
2005	Jordan Grand Prix	Jordan EJ15	Toyota V10	AUS	MAL	BHR	SMR	ESP	MON	EUR; TD	CAN	USA	FRA	GBR	GER	HUN	TUR	ITA	BEL	BRA	JPN	CHN	–	–
2006	Super Aguri F1 Team	Super Aguri SA05	Honda V8	BHR	MAL	AUS	SMR	EUR; Ret	ESP; Ret	MON; 16	GBR; 18	CAN; Ret	USA; Ret	FRA; 16									27th	0
2006	Super Aguri F1 Team	Super Aguri SA06	Honda V8												GER	HUN	TUR; TD	ITA; TD	CHN; TD	JPN; TD	BRA; TD		27th	0

=== Complete A1 Grand Prix results ===
(key)

Year	Entrant	1	2	3	4	5	6	7	8	9	10	11	12	13	14	15	16	17	18	19	20	DC	Points	Ref
2007–08	France	NED; SPR	NED; FEA	CZE; SPR	CZE; FEA	MYS; SPR	MYS; FEA	CHN; SPR	CHN; FEA	NZL; SPR	NZL; FEA	AUS; SPR	AUS; FEA	RSA; SPR	RSA; FEA	MEX; SPR	MEX; FEA	CHN; SPR; 12	CHN; FEA; 8	GBR; SPR; 10	GBR; FEA; 5	4th	118	

=== American open–wheel racing results ===
(key)

==== IndyCar Series ====
Year	Team	No.	Chassis	Engine	1	2	3	4	5	6	7	8	9	10	11	12	13	14	15	16	17	18	19	Rank	Points	Ref
2008	Forsythe/Pettit Racing	7	Panoz	Cosworth	HMS	STP	MOT^{1}	LBH^{1} 2	KAN	INDY	MIL	TXS	IOW	RIR	WGL	NSH	MDO	EDM	KTY	SNM	DET	CHI	SRF^{2}	40th	0	
2009	Andretti Green Racing	25	Dallara	Honda	STP	LBH	KAN	INDY	MIL	TXS	IOW	RIR	WGL	TOR	EDM	KTY	MDO	SNM; 20	CHI	MOT	HMS			38th	12	
2014	Andretti Autosport	26	Dallara DW12	Honda	STP	LBH	ALA	IMS; 22	INDY	DET	DET	TXS	HOU	HOU	POC	IOW	TOR	TOR	MDO	MIL	SNM	FON		36th	8	

^{1} Run on same day.
^{2} Non-points-paying, exhibition race.

=== Complete Superleague Formula results ===
(key) (Races in bold indicate pole position; races in italics indicate fastest lap)

Year	Team	1	2	3	4	5	6	7	8	9	10	11	12	13	14	15	16	17	18	19	20	21	22	23	24	Pos	Pts
2010	Girondins de Bordeaux Barazi-Epsilon	SIL; 1 DNS	SIL; 2; 8	ASS; 1; 14	ASS; 2; 3	MAG; 1; 10	MAG; 2; 14	JAR; 1; 17	JAR; 2; 1	NÜR; 1; 15	NÜR; 2; 2	ZOL; 1	ZOL; 2	BRH; 1; 5	BRH; 2; 14	ADR; 1	ADR; 2	POR; 1	POR; 2	ORD; 1	ORD; 2	BEI; 1	BEI; 2	NAV; 1	NAV; 2	11th	372

==== Super Final results ====
(key) (Races in bold indicate pole position; races in italics indicate fastest lap)

Year	Team	1	2	3	4	5	6	7	8	9	10	11	12
2010	Girondins de Bordeaux Barazi-Epsilon	SIL; DNQ	ASS; DNQ	MAG; DNQ	JAR; DNQ	NÜR; DNQ	ZOL	BRH; DNQ	ADR	POR	ORD	BEI	NAV

=== Complete Formula E results ===
(key) (Races in bold indicate pole position; races in italics indicate fastest lap)

Year	Team	Chassis	Powertrain	1	2	3	4	5	6	7	8	9	10	11	Pos	Points
2014–15	Andretti Autosport	Spark SRT01-e	SRT01-e	BEI; 2	PUT; DSQ	PDE	BUE	MIA	LBH	MCO	BER	MSC	LDN	LDN	16th	18

Sporting positions
Preceded by Sébastien Philippe	Formula Campus; Champion; 1994	Succeeded by Renaud Malinconi
Preceded by Antonio García	Open Telefónica by Nissan; Champion; 2001	Succeeded by Ricardo Zonta
Preceded by Ricardo Zonta	Superfund World Series; Champion; 2003	Succeeded by Heikki Kovalainen
