= Jean-Christophe Ravier =

French racing driver

- Nationality: (France) French
- Born: 10 April 1979 (age 47) Avignon (France)

Jean-Christophe Ravier (born 10 April 1979 in Avignon) is a French former racing driver. He has competed in such series as World Series by Nissan and Formula Renault 2000 Eurocup.
