= Polo Villaamil =

Spanish auto racing driver (born 1979)

Leopoldo Pérez "Polo" de Villaamil Muñoz-Calero (born November 18, 1979, in Madrid) is a Spanish former auto racing driver.

== Career ==
After previously competing in karting, Villaamil won the Spanish Formula Renault Championship in 1997. In 1998, he competed in one race in International Formula 3000. In 1999, he raced for Coloni Motorsport in two races of International F3000, and four races of the Italian F3000 series.

In 2001, Villaamil finished eighth in the Euro Formula 3000 series. For 2002, he moved to the World Series by Nissan, finishing tenth in the standings. He took a win for RC Motorsport the following year, finishing eleventh in the standings.

In 2005, Villaamil raced in his home round of the World Touring Car Championship for the GR Asia team.
