= Superleague Formula round China =

- Beijing International Street Circuit / Ordos International Circuit

Event information
- No. of events: 2
- First held: 2010
- Last held: 2010
- Most wins (club): 5 different clubs 1
- Most wins (driver): 5 different drivers 1

Last event (2010 Beijing) winners
Race 1	(England) Tottenham Hotspur	Craig Dolby
Race 2	(Portugal) F.C. Porto	Álvaro Parente
S. Final	race cancelled	

The Superleague Formula round China is a round of the Superleague Formula. In 2010 China became the first country outside Europe to host a Superleague Formula event, holding two events, one at the newly built Ordos International Circuit and the other around the streets of the Shunyi Olympic Rowing-Canoeing Park.

== Winners ==
Season	Race	Club	Driver	Location	Date	Report
2010	R1	(Greece) Olympiacos CFP	(United Kingdom) Ben Hanley	Ordos International Circuit	October 3	Report
2010	R2	(England) Liverpool F.C.	(Belgium) Frédéric Vervisch	Ordos International Circuit	October 3	Report
2010	SF	(France) GD Bordeaux	(France) Franck Perera	Ordos International Circuit	October 3	Report
2010	R1	(England) Tottenham Hotspur	(United Kingdom) Craig Dolby	Beijing International Street Circuit	October 10	Report
2010	R2	(Portugal) F.C. Porto	(Portugal) Álvaro Parente	Beijing International Street Circuit	October 10	Report
2010	SF	race cancelled due to poor track and weather conditions		Beijing International Street Circuit	October 10	Report
2011	R1			Beijing International Street Circuit	TBC	Report
2011	R2			Beijing International Street Circuit	TBC	Report
2011	SF			Beijing International Street Circuit	TBC	Report
2011	R1			Shanghai International Circuit	TBC	Report
2011	R2			Shanghai International Circuit	TBC	Report
2011	SF			Shanghai International Circuit	TBC	Report
