= List of Superleague Formula drivers and teams =

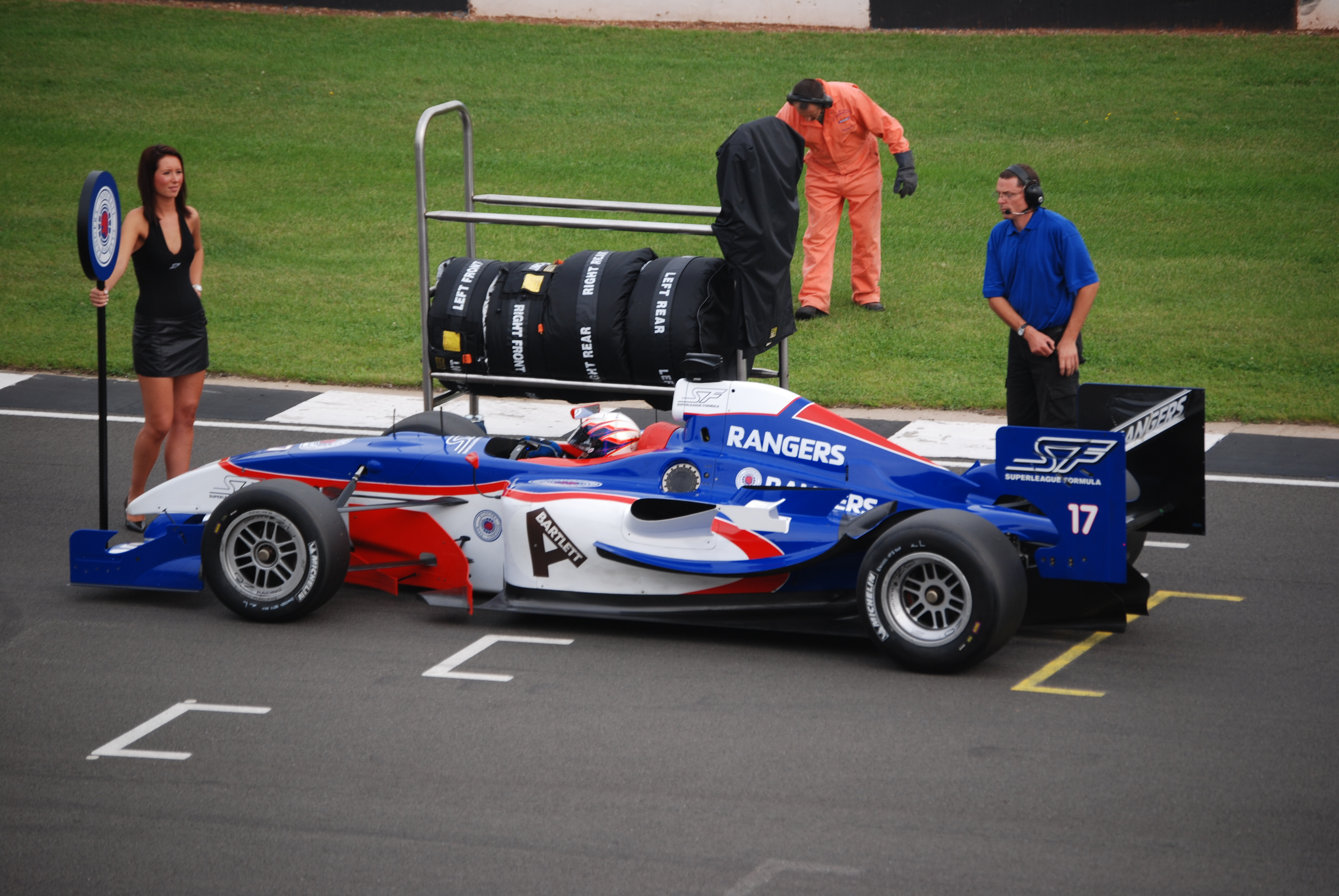
Ryan Dalziel on the grid in the Rangers F.C. car at the 2008 Donington Park round

This is a list of Superleague Formula drivers and teams, that is, a list of all those who have made at least one race start in Superleague Formula. This list is accurate up to and including the final round of the 2010 championship at Navarra.

== Drivers ==
A total of 57 different drivers have raced at least once in Superleague Formula with seven of them having also had Formula One race experience. Drivers of eighteen different nationalities have competed in the series. There have been several British, French and Spanish drivers, while drivers from countries such as Greece, China, New Zealand and the United Arab Emirates have also earned race weekends. Craig Dolby is the only driver to have started all 48 main races in the series since the inaugural race in 2008.

Name	Nation	Seasons	Championship Titles	Race Starts	Poles	Wins	Podiums	Fastest Laps
Kasper Andersen	Denmark	2008, 2009	0	20	1	0	1	0
Bertrand Baguette	Belgium	2008	0	4	0	0	0	0
Earl Bamber	New Zealand	2010, 2011	0	4	0	0	2	0
Enrique Bernoldi	Brazil	2009	0	10	0	0	1	0
Sébastien Bourdais	France	2009, 2010	0	15	1	2	5	1
Yelmer Buurman	Netherlands	2008, 2009, 2010, 2011	0	47	0	4	10	8
Máximo Cortés	Spain	2010	0	4	0	0	0	0
Ryan Dalziel	United Kingdom	2008	0	10	0	0	0	0
Carlo van Dam	Netherlands	2009	0	6	0	0	0	0
Craig Dolby	United Kingdom	2008, 2009, 2010, 2011	0	48	1	3	15	5
Robert Doornbos	Netherlands	2008, 2010, 2011	0	33	1	2	7	1
Chris van der Drift	New Zealand	2010	0	16	1	2	6	0
Adderly Fong	China	2010	0	3	0	0	0	0
Borja García	Spain	2008, 2010	0	22	0	1	1	0
Tristan Gommendy	France	2008, 2009, 2010, 2011	0	45	0	2	6	2
Esteban Guerrieri	Argentina	2009, 2010	0	12	1	2	4	1
Ben Hanley	United Kingdom	2010	0	8	1	1	2	2
Dominik Jackson	United Kingdom	2008	0	2	0	0	0	0
Neel Jani	Switzerland	2010, 2011	0	2	0	1	1	0
Julien Jousse	France	2009, 2010	0	26	1	1	4	1
Narain Karthikeyan	India	2010	0	12	0	1	1	0
Stamatis Katsimis	Greece	2008	0	4	0	0	0	0
Jonathan Kennard	United Kingdom	2009	0	8	0	0	0	0
Jaap van Lagen	Netherlands	2010	0	2	0	0	0	0
Hywel Lloyd	United Kingdom	2010	0	4	0	0	0	0
Qinghua Ma	China	2010	0	2	0	0	0	0
Scott Mansell	United Kingdom	2009	0	2	0	0	0	0
John Martin	Australia	2009, 2010, 2011	0	35	2	4	8	0
Marcos Martínez	Spain	2010	0	24	1	1	2	0
Paul Meijer	Netherlands	2008, 2010	0	6	1	1	2	0
Bruno Méndez	Spain	2010	0	2	0	0	0	0
Celso Míguez	Spain	2010	0	4	0	0	0	0
Miguel Molina	Spain	2009	0	2	0	0	0	0
Franck Montagny	France	2010	0	11	0	1	3	1
Dominick Muermans	Netherlands	2008, 2009	0	8	0	0	0	0
Nelson Panciatici	France	2009	0	12	0	0	0	0
Giorgio Pantano	Italy	2009	0	12	0	1	2	0
Álvaro Parente	Portugal	2009, 2010	0	24	1	4	5	2
Franck Perera	France	2008, 2009, 2010	0	24	1	0	4	0
Pedro Petiz	Portugal	2009	0	12	0	1	2	0
Nelson Philippe	France	2008	0	3	0	0	0	0
Alessandro Pier Guidi	Italy	2008	0	12	0	0	3	0
Antônio Pizzonia	Brazil	2008, 2009, 2011	0	22	3	0	3	4
Giacomo Ricci	Italy	2010	0	3	0	0	0	0
Davide Rigon	Italy	2008, 2009, 2010	2 (2008, 2010)	42	4	5	14	4
Tuka Rocha	Brazil	2008	0	12	0	0	1	0
Filip Salaquarda	Czech Republic	2011	0	0	0	0	0	0
Andy Soucek	Spain	2008, 2010, 2011	0	21	0	0	2	4
Duncan Tappy	United Kingdom	2008, 2009, 2010, 2011	0	24	0	0	7	1
Enrico Toccacelo	Italy	2008	0	10	0	0	1	1
Ho-Pin Tung	China	2009, 2011	0	12	0	1	2	0
Adrián Vallés	Spain	2008, 2009, 2010	1 (2009)	30	2	3	7	1
Frédéric Vervisch	Belgium	2010, 2011	0	10	0	1	2	3
María de Villota	Spain	2009, 2010, 2011	0	22	0	0	0	0
James Walker	United Kingdom	2008, 2010	0	18	0	1	1	0
Max Wissel	Germany	2008, 2009, 2010	0	45	1	2	7	6
Andreas Zuber	United Arab Emirates	2008	0	4	0	0	0	0

NOTE – not including any Race 3 results (applies to Magny-Cours, Donington Park, Estoril and Jarama in 2009 and every race in 2010).

=== By nationality ===
Country	Total	Champions	Current	First driver(s)	Last/current driver(s)
Argentina	1	0	0	Esteban Guerrieri (2009)	Esteban Guerrieri (2010)
Australia	1	0	1	John Martin (2009)	John Martin
Belgium	2	0	1	Bertrand Baguette (2008)	Frédéric Vervisch
Brazil	3	0	1	Tuka Rocha (2008)	Antônio Pizzonia
China	3	0	1	Ho-Pin Tung (2009)	Ho-Pin Tung
Czech Republic	1	0	1	Filip Salaquarda (2011)	Filip Salaquarda
Denmark	1	0	0	Kasper Andersen (2008)	Kasper Andersen (2009)
France	7	0	1	Tristan Gommendy, Nelson Philippe (2008)	Tristan Gommendy
Germany	1	0	0	Max Wissel (2008)	Max Wissel (2010)
Greece	1	0	0	Stamatis Katsimis (2008)	Stamatis Katsimis (2008)
India	1	0	0	Narain Karthikeyan (2010)	Narain Karthikeyan (2010)
Italy	5	2 (Rigon, 2008, 2010)	0	Alessandro Pier Guidi, Davide Rigon, Enrico Toccacelo (2008)	Davide Rigon (2010)
Netherlands	6	0	2	Yelmer Buurman, Robert Doornbos (2008)	Yelmer Buurman, Robert Doornbos
New Zealand	2	0	1	Chris van der Drift (2010)	Earl Bamber
Portugal	2	0	0	Pedro Petiz (2009)	Álvaro Parente (2010)
Spain	9	1 (Vallés, 2009)	2	Borja García, Andy Soucek, Adrián Vallés (2008)	Andy Soucek, María de Villota
Switzerland	1	0	1	Neel Jani (2010)	Neel Jani
United Arab Emirates	1	0	0	Andreas Zuber (2008)	Andreas Zuber (2008)
United Kingdom	9	0	2	Ryan Dalziel, Craig Dolby, Duncan Tappy (2008)	Craig Dolby, Duncan Tappy

== Racing teams ==
Name	Nation	Seasons	Championship Titles	Race Starts	Poles	Wins	Podiums	Fastest Laps
Alan Docking Racing	United Kingdom	2008, 2009, 2010, 2011	0	118	6	7	23	7
Alpha Motorsport (with ADR)	United Kingdom	2010	0	20	0	0	3	1
Alpha Team (solo)	United Kingdom	2010	0	24	0	0	4	0
Atech GP/Reid Motorsport	United Kingdom	2010, 2011	0	111	1	7	17	10
Azerti Motorsport	Belgium	2008, 2009, 2010, 2011	1 (2010)	112	3	5	18	4
Barazi-Epsilon	France	2009, 2010	0	41	0	1	5	1
Delta Motorsport (with ADR)	United Kingdom	2009	0	6	0	0	0	0
Drivex	Spain	2010	0	8	0	0	0	0
EmiliodeVillota Motorsport	Spain	2010, 2011	0	54	2	2	5	1
EuroInternational	Italy	2008	0	21	0	0	1	4
FMS International	Italy	2008	0	12	1	0	3	0
GTA Motor Competición	Spain	2008	0	24	0	1	4	0
GU-Racing International	Germany	2008, 2009, 2010	0	98	4	7	19	10
Hitech Junior Team	United Kingdom	2008, 2009	1 (2009)	46	3	6	12	2
LRS Formula / Laurent Rédon Motorsport	France	2010	0	11	0	1	1	1
Racing for Holland	Netherlands	2010	0	8	0	0	0	0
Reid Motorsport (solo)	United Kingdom	2009	0	8	1	2	4	0
Scuderia Playteam	Italy	2008	0	23	1	2	8	0
Team Astromega	Belgium	2008	0	24	0	0	4	1
Ultimate Motorsport	United Kingdom	2009	0	16	0	1	2	0
Zakspeed	Germany	2008, 2009	1 (2008)	46	2	6	11	6

- Team West-Tec (in 2008) and Durango (in 2010) only managed cars during pre-season and never actually entered a race.

NOTE – not including any Race 3 results (applies to Magny-Cours, Donington Park, Estoril and Jarama in 2009 and every race in 2010).
