= List of Superleague Formula circuits =

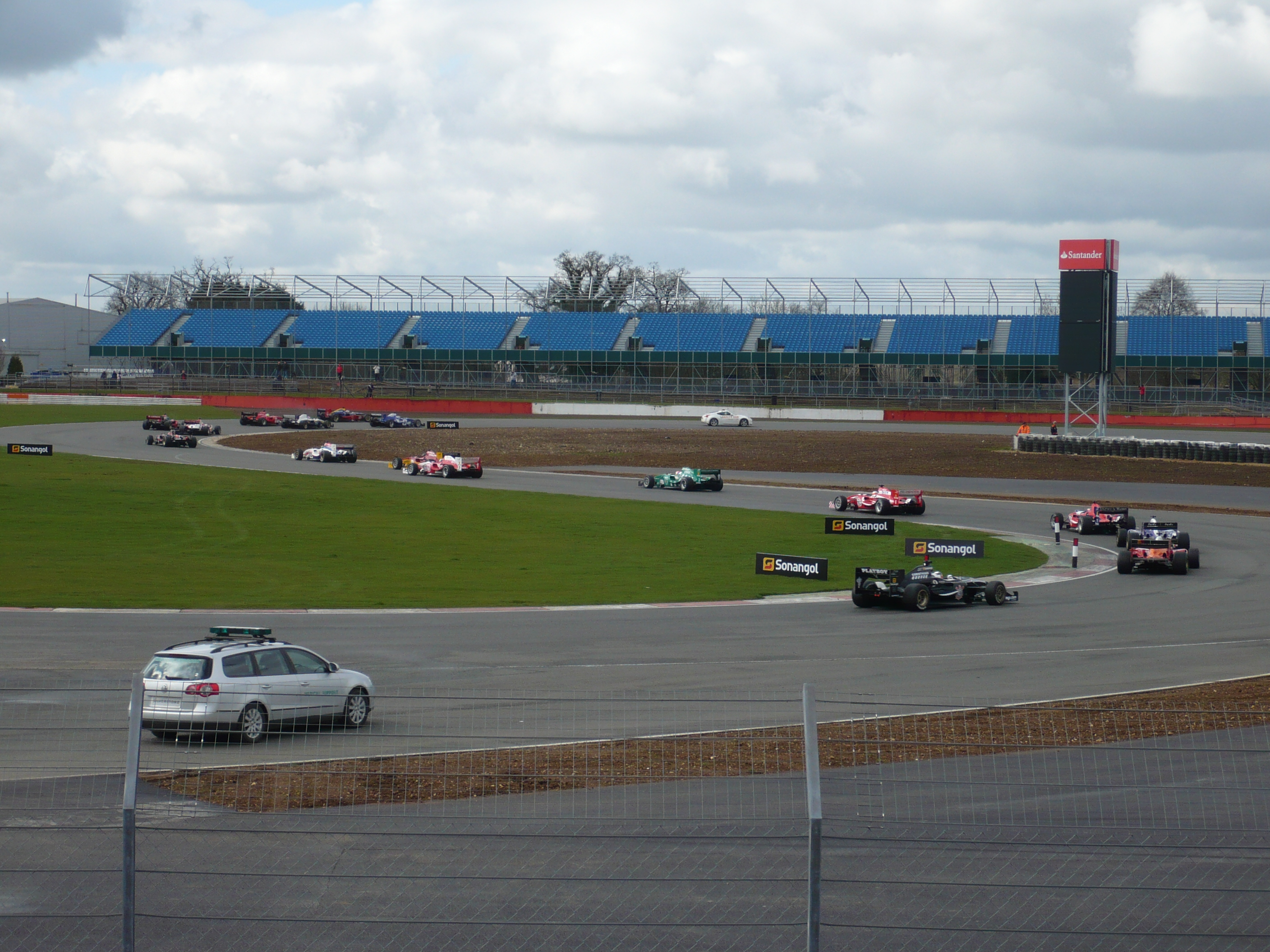
Formation lap around Brooklands corner at Silverstone Circuit in 2010

This is a list of Superleague Formula circuits, that is a list of circuits which have hosted at least one round of the Superleague Formula championship since 2008. In total, 17 different circuits from nine countries have hosted a race weekend. The first to do so was Donington Park, where the first races, at the 2008 Donington Park Superleague Formula round, were held. The Ordos International Circuit was the first circuit outside Europe to host a Superleague Formula event. Only the circuit of Circuit Zolder in Belgium has hosted races in every season until now. On 2011 season, just two races were held; then the series was discontinued after just four seasons of racing.

== Circuits ==
Circuit		Type	Location	Country	Season(s)	Map
Adria	Adria International Raceway	race circuit	Adria	Italy	2010	
Assen	TT Circuit Assen	race circuit	Assen	Netherlands	2010, 2011	
Beijing SC	Beijing International Street Circuit	street circuit	Beijing	China	2010	
Brands Hatch	Brands Hatch	race circuit	Kent	United Kingdom	2010	
Donington Park	Donington Park	race circuit	North West Leicestershire	United Kingdom	2008, 2009	
Estoril	Circuito do Estoril	race circuit	Estoril	Portugal	2008, 2009	
Jarama	Circuito del Jarama	race circuit	Madrid	Spain	2009, 2010	
Jerez	Circuito de Jerez	race circuit	Jerez de la Frontera	Spain	2008	
Magny-Cours	Circuit de Nevers Magny-Cours	race circuit	Magny-Cours	France	2009, 2010	
Monza	Autodromo Nazionale Monza	race circuit	Monza	Italy	2009	
Navarra	Circuito de Navarra	race circuit	Los Arcos	Spain	2010	
Nürburgring	Nürburgring	race circuit	Nürburg	Germany	2008, 2010	
Ordos	Ordos International Circuit	race circuit	Ordos City	China	2010	
Portimão	Autódromo Internacional do Algarve	race circuit	Portimão	Portugal	2010	
Silverstone	Silverstone Circuit	race circuit	Northamptonshire and Buckinghamshire	United Kingdom	2010	
Vallelunga	ACI Vallelunga Circuit	race circuit	Campagnano di Roma	Italy	2008	
Zolder	Circuit Zolder	race circuit	Heusden-Zolder	Belgium	2008, 2009, 2010, 2011	
