= Superleague Formula round Portugal =

Round of a car racing tournament

- Autódromo do Estoril / Autódromo Internacional do Algarve

Event information
- No. of events: 3
- First held: 2008
- Last held: 2010
- Most wins (club): (England) Liverpool F.C. 2 (Greece) Olympiacos CFP 2
- Most wins (driver): 8 different drivers 1

Last event (2010 Portimão) winners
Race 1	(China) Beijing Guoan	John Martin
Race 2	(Greece) Olympiacos CFP	Neel Jani
S. Final	(England) Liverpool F.C.	Frédéric Vervisch

The Superleague Formula round Portugal is a round of the Superleague Formula. After hosting rounds at Autódromo do Estoril in 2008 and 2009, the Portuguese round moves to Portimão's Autódromo Internacional do Algarve for 2010.

== Winners ==
Season	Race	Club	Driver	Location	Date	Report
2008	R1	(England) Liverpool F.C.	(Spain) Adrián Vallés	Autódromo do Estoril	October 19	Report
2008	R2	(United Arab Emirates) Al Ain	(Netherlands) Paul Meijer	Autódromo do Estoril	October 19	Report
2009	R1	(Greece) Olympiacos CFP	(Argentina) Esteban Guerrieri	Autódromo do Estoril	September 6	Report
2009	R2	(Portugal) F.C. Porto	(Portugal) Álvaro Parente	Autódromo do Estoril	September 6	Report
2009	SF	(Spain) Sevilla FC	(France) Sébastien Bourdais	Autódromo do Estoril	September 6	Report
2010	R1	(China) Beijing Guoan	(Australia) John Martin	Autódromo Internacional do Algarve	September 19	Report
2010	R2	(Greece) Olympiacos CFP	(Switzerland) Neel Jani	Autódromo Internacional do Algarve	September 19	Report
2010	SF	(England) Liverpool F.C.	(Belgium) Frédéric Vervisch	Autódromo Internacional do Algarve	September 19	Report
