= China (Superleague Formula team) =

National motor racing team

Team China SF Racing Team
Founded	2010
Country	China
Driver(s)	Qinghua Ma (2010); Adderly Fong (2010); Ho-Pin Tung (2011)
First race	2010 Ordos round
Last race	2011 Assen round
Rounds	3
Ch'ships	0
Total points	60 (including Super Finals)
2010 position	19th (26 pts)
Races / Poles / Wins / Podiums / F. Laps; 3 / 0 / 0 / 0 / 0
NOTE - Data not including Super Finals

Team China Superleague Formula team is a national racing team from China, similar to the A1 Team China which competed in A1 Grand Prix between 2005 and 2009. The car will compete in Superleague Formula for the two Chinese races in October of the 2010 season. Although not strictly associated with a football club, it was the first of many cars to dissociate with the football club branding. It will be operated by Atech GP/Reid Motorsport for the Ordos and Beijing rounds, driven by home-racer Qinghua Ma.

== Record ==
(key)

=== 2010 ===
Operator(s)	Driver(s)	1	2	3	4	5	6	7	8	9	10			NC			11	Points	Rank
Operator(s)	Driver(s)	SIL	ASS	MAG	JAR	NÜR	ZOL	BRH	ADR	POR	ORD			BEI			NAV	Points	Rank
Atech GP/Reid Motorsport	(China) Qinghua Ma										12	13	X					26	19th
Atech GP/Reid Motorsport	(China) Adderly Fong													10	DN	C		26	19th
