= 2011 Assen Superleague Formula round =

2011 Assen Superleague Formula round Superleague Formula round Netherlands
- Circuit Map
- Date: June 5, 2011
- Location: TT Circuit Assen, Assen, Netherlands
- Course: Permanent racing facility 2.830 mi (4.554 km)
- Laps: 26 & 26
Pole position
Team	France – GDB	Tristan Gommendy
- Time: 1:26.313
Podium (1st race)
First	Netherlands – PSV	Yelmer Buurman
Second	England	Craig Dolby
Third	Luxembourg	Frédéric Vervisch
Fastest lap (1st race)
Team	France – GDB	Tristan Gommendy
- Time: 1:26.192 (on lap 13)
Podium (2nd race)
First	Japan	Duncan Tappy
Second	Australia	John Martin
Third	Brazil	Antônio Pizzonia
Fastest lap (2nd race)
Team	Czech Republic – SPR	Filip Salaquarda
- Time: 1:26.481 (on lap 14)

The 2011 Assen Superleague Formula round, also referred to as the 2011 Superleague Formula GP Holland, was a Superleague Formula round held on June 5, 2011, at the TT Circuit Assen, Assen, Netherlands. It was the second ever round at the Assen circuit, following a round in 2010. It was the first round, or 'Grand Prix', of the 2011 Superleague Formula season.

Fourteen cars took part, however only six sported the liveries of football clubs as per Superleague Formula tradition. The rest were branded with the colours of particular nations. Two cars from the Netherlands took part: PSV Eindhoven and Team Netherlands.

Support races included the Dutch Supercar Challenge, Formula Renault 2.0 Northern European Cup, the German Formula Three Championship and Superkart racing.

== Results ==
=== Qualifying ===
- In each group, the top four qualify for the quarter-finals.

==== Group A ====
Pos.	Team	Driver	Time
1	Belgium – AND	(Switzerland) Neel Jani	1:26.261
2	Luxembourg	(Belgium) Frédéric Vervisch	1:26.367
3	Turkey – GAL	(Spain) Andy Soucek	1:26.825
4	Brazil	(Brazil) Antônio Pizzonia	1:27.178
5	Australia	(Australia) John Martin	1:27.315
6	Czech Republic – SPR	(Czech Republic) Filip Salaquarda	1:27.463
7	Japan	(United Kingdom) Duncan Tappy	1:27.743

==== Group B ====
Pos.	Team	Driver	Time
1	Netherlands – PSV	(Netherlands) Yelmer Buurman	1:26.176
2	New Zealand	(New Zealand) Earl Bamber	1:26.387
3	France – GDB	(France) Tristan Gommendy	1:26.490
4	Netherlands	(Netherlands) Robert Doornbos	1:26.703
5	England	(United Kingdom) Craig Dolby	1:26.709
6	China	(China) Ho-Pin Tung	1:29.162
7	Spain – ATM	(Spain) María de Villota	no time set

==== Knockout stages ====
Quarter-Finals			Semi-Finals		Pole Shoot Out
A4	Brazil	1:27.939
B1	Netherlands – PSV	1:29.359	Brazil	1:27.616
A2	Luxembourg	1:28.097	France – GDB	1:26.481
B3	France – GDB	1:26.851			France – GDB	1:26.313
A3	Turkey – GAL	1:27.285			New Zealand	1:26.745
B2	New Zealand	1:26.799	New Zealand	1:26.708
A1	Belgium – AND	1:26.934	Netherlands	1:26.831
B4	Netherlands	1:26.690

== Standings after the round ==
Pos	Team	Points
1	Japan	77
2	Australia	77
3	England	74
4	Netherlands – PSV	72
5	Brazil	68
