= 2011 Superleague Formula season =

Fourth and final season of the Superleague Formula championship

Seasons
- ← 2010 none →

The 2011 Superleague Formula season was the fourth and final season Superleague Formula championship. The series reverted to being known simply as "Superleague Formula", with 2009's two-year sponsorship deal with Sonangol also having expired. The first race of the season was held on 5 June at Assen and was due to finish at a venue in New Zealand after 8 race weekends.

After three seasons in which the cars were run in club team colours, the 2011 season saw drivers competing in the colours of their nation, with countries adorning team names as had been set out by Team China in 2010, thus beginning a severing of the strong links the series had attempted to make by linking each team entry with a football club. As many as eight of the announced fourteen entries no longer had links with football teams.

The season ended after just two of the scheduled rounds after a number of complications, which saw tracks not being ready in time for the series, and disagreements with race organisers.

== Teams and drivers ==
- All teams competed on Michelin tyres for the fourth season in a row.

Entrant	Race team	No.	Race driver(s)	Rounds
Belgium – R.S.C. Anderlecht	(Belgium) Azerti Motorsport	1	(Switzerland) Neel Jani	All
Netherlands – PSV Eindhoven	(Belgium) Azerti Motorsport	2	(Netherlands) Yelmer Buurman	All
France – Girondins de Bordeaux	(Belgium) Azerti Motorsport	3	(France) Tristan Gommendy	All
Czech Republic – AC Sparta Prague	(United Kingdom) Atech Reid Grand Prix	4	(Czech Republic) Filip Salaquarda	All
Luxembourg	(United Kingdom) Atech Reid Grand Prix	5	(Belgium) Frédéric Vervisch	All
New Zealand	(United Kingdom) Atech Reid Grand Prix	6	(New Zealand) Earl Bamber	1
New Zealand	(United Kingdom) Atech Reid Grand Prix	6	(New Zealand) Chris van der Drift	2
Japan	(United Kingdom) Atech Reid Grand Prix	7	(United Kingdom) Duncan Tappy	1
Japan	(United Kingdom) Atech Reid Grand Prix	7	(Netherlands) Robert Doornbos	2
Netherlands	(United Kingdom) Atech Reid Grand Prix	8	(Netherlands) Robert Doornbos	1
Russia	(United Kingdom) Atech Reid Grand Prix	17	(Russia) Mikhail Aleshin	2
Spain – Atlético de Madrid	(Spain) EmiliodeVillota Motorsport	9	(Spain) María de Villota	1
Spain – Atlético de Madrid	(Spain) EmiliodeVillota Motorsport	9	(Spain) Andy Soucek	2
Turkey – Galatasaray S.K.	(Spain) EmiliodeVillota Motorsport	10	(Spain) Andy Soucek	1
Turkey – Galatasaray S.K.	(Spain) EmiliodeVillota Motorsport	10	(United Kingdom) Duncan Tappy	2
China	(Spain) EmiliodeVillota Motorsport	11	(China) Ho-Pin Tung	1
South Korea	(Spain) EmiliodeVillota Motorsport	19	(Germany) Max Wissel	2
Brazil	(United Kingdom) Alan Docking Racing	14	(Brazil) Antônio Pizzonia	All
Australia	(United Kingdom) Alan Docking Racing	24	(Australia) John Martin	All
England	(United Kingdom) Alan Docking Racing	31	(United Kingdom) Craig Dolby	All

=== Driver changes ===
Entering/Re-Entering Superleague Formula

- After racing the 2010 season in Stock Car Brasil, Antônio Pizzonia returns to Superleague Formula with the Brazil entrant.
- Formula Renault 3.5 Series driver Filip Salaquarda will join new Superleague Formula club, AC Sparta Prague, supported by Atech Reid Grand Prix.

Leaving Superleague Formula

- Adderly Fong and Hywel Lloyd will both move back to British Formula 3 in 2011 with Sino Vision Racing, as will Bruno Méndez, racing for Hitech Racing.
- Having contested the final race of the 2010 season with PSV Eindhoven, Esteban Guerrieri will move into Firestone Indy Lights with Sam Schmidt Motorsports.
- Máximo Cortés, Julien Jousse and James Walker will race in the Le Mans Series in 2011, having raced in Superleague Formula on different occasions in 2010.
- Narain Karthikeyan, who raced for PSV Eindhoven during much of 2010, will return to Formula One with Hispania Racing following a five-year absence from the series.
- Celso Míguez will race in the Spanish GT Championship in 2011 with Aurora Racing Team having competed in Superleague Formula at two events during 2010.
- Last year's Superleague Formula champion Davide Rigon will make the step up to the GP2 Series in 2011 with team Scuderia Coloni.

==== Mid-season changes ====
- Chris van der Drift switched to the Formula Renault 3.5 Series for the start of 2011 but returned to Superleague Formula for round two in Zolder. Max Wissel rejoined the series with new entrant South Korea, and Mikhail Aleshin joined the other new entrant, Russia, racing in Superleague Formula for the first time. Robert Doornbos took over from Duncan Tappy in the championship-leading Japan car, with Tappy moving to the Galatasaray car to replace Andy Soucek, who in turn replaces María de Villota at Atlético de Madrid.

== 2011 schedule ==
- Superleague Formula announced its full 2011 calendar on May 2, which saw the championship embark on a "Nations Cup", with races on four different continents this season in 8 rounds. For the first time, races were scheduled to be held in Russia, Brazil (two races), the Middle East and New Zealand. The Russian round, due to be held at the newly built Smolensk Ring, was later cancelled. The Middle East round was later replaced by a round in South Korea and a second round in China was added to replace the Russian round. The two rounds in Brazil were cancelled after apparent issues with the track in Goiânia. The series finale in New Zealand was later cancelled. The "Nations Cup" branding also had to be abandoned due to issues with naming rights which the series was still looking to resolve.
- With the announcement of the calendar, it was confirmed that each round was known as a 'Grand Prix'.
- The SF World Feed commentators at Zolder were Andrew Coley and Earl Bamber.

=== Race calendar and results ===
Round		Grand Prix	Date	Pole position	Fastest lap	Winning club	Winning team	Weekend winner	Report
1	R1	(Netherlands) GP Assen – Holland	4–5 June	France – GDB	France – GDB	Netherlands – PSV	(Belgium) Azerti Motorsport	England	Report
1	R2	(Netherlands) GP Assen – Holland	4–5 June		Czech Republic – SPR	Japan	(United Kingdom) Atech Reid Grand Prix	England	Report
2	R1	GP Zolder – Belgium	16–17 July	England	New Zealand	England	(United Kingdom) Alan Docking Racing	Luxembourg	Report
2	R2	GP Zolder – Belgium	16–17 July		Australia	Australia	(United Kingdom) Alan Docking Racing	Luxembourg	Report

=== Cancelled races ===
Grand Prix	Date
GP Italy	16–17 April
GP Portugal	7–8 May
GP Germany	18–19 June
GP Spain	2–3 July
(United Kingdom) GP Britain	6–7 August
GP Russia	3–4 September
GP Goiânia – Brazil	8–9 October
(Brazil) TBC	15–16 October
GP Beijing – China	29–30 October
GP Shanghai – China	5–6 November
GP Seoul – South Korea	12–13 November
(New Zealand) TBC	10–11 December

=== Test calendar and results ===
- There was a two-day pre-season test session at Spain's Circuito Monteblanco on 9–10 December 2010.
- The Circuito de Navarra in Spain was due to host a two-day test on 30–31 August 2011. However, the scheduled event was cancelled, without an explanatory announcement.

== Championship standings ==
Pos	Entrant	Drivers	ASS (Netherlands)			ZOL (Belgium)			Pts
Pos	Entrant	Drivers	R1	R2	S	R1	R2	S	Pts
1	Australia	(Australia) John Martin	6	2	4	7	1	2	158
2	Japan	(England) Duncan Tappy	7	1	**6**				136
2	Japan	(Netherlands) Robert Doornbos				5	7	6	136
3	Luxembourg	(Belgium) Frédéric Vervisch	3	13	DN	3	4	**1**	134
4	Netherlands – PSV Eindhoven	(Netherlands) Yelmer Buurman	1	10	3	6	6	7	130
5	Belgium – RSC Anderlecht	(Switzerland) Neel Jani	4	9	7	2	9	3	125
6	England	(England) Craig Dolby	2	8	1	**1**	13	X	124
7	New Zealand	(New Zealand) Earl Bamber	9	5	X				113
7	New Zealand	(New Zealand) Chris van der Drift				4	8	5	113
8	Brazil	(Brazil) Antônio Pizzonia	8	3	2	9	12	X	102
9	Czech Republic – AC Sparta Praha	(Czech Republic) Filip Salaquarda	5	6	5	12	10	X	95
10	Turkey – Galatasaray SK	(Spain) Andy Soucek	13	7	X				88
10	Turkey – Galatasaray SK	(England) Duncan Tappy				10	5	X	88
11	South Korea	(Germany) Max Wissel				8	2	4	71
12	Russia	(Russia) Mikhail Aleshin				11	3	8	56
13	France – Girondins de Bordeaux	(France) Tristan Gommendy	**14**	**4**	X	14	**11**	X	52
14	China	(China) Ho-Pin Tung	10	11	X				34
15	Spain – Atlético de Madrid	(Spain) María de Villota	12	12	X				28
15	Spain – Atlético de Madrid	(Spain) Andy Soucek				13	14	X	28
16	Netherlands	(Netherlands) Robert Doornbos	11	DN	X				16
Pos	Entrant	Drivers	R1	R2	S	R1	R2	S	Pts
Pos	Entrant	Drivers	ASS (Netherlands)			ZOL (Belgium)			Pts

Colour	Result
Gold	Winner
Silver	2nd place
Bronze	3rd place
Green	Finished
Purple	Did not finish
Red	Did not qualify (X)
Black	Disqualified (DQ)
White	Did not start (DN)
White	Race cancelled (C)
Blank	Excluded (EX)
Blank	Withdrew (WD)
**Bold**	Pole position
Italics	Fastest lap

NOTE – R2 starts
with reverse grid
**S** = Super Final

Race 1 and 2 points

Position	1st	2nd	3rd	4th	5th	6th	7th	8th	9th	10th	11th	12th	13th	14th	15th	16th	17th	18th	19th	20th	21st	22nd	DNF	DNS	Ref
Points	50	45	40	36	32	29	26	23	20	18	16	14	12	10	8	7	6	5	4	3	2	1	0	0	

Super Final points

Position	1st	2nd	3rd	4th	5th	6th	7th	8th	DNQ	DNS	Ref
Points	6	5	4	3	2	1	0	0	0	0	

- New for 2011 was the alteration that the top 8 points-scorers from the weekend would compete in the Super Final, in contrast to 2010 where only the top 6 would qualify.
