= 2010 Ordos Superleague Formula round =

2010 Ordos Superleague Formula round Superleague Formula round China
- Circuit Map
- Date: October 3, 2010
- Location: Ordos International Circuit, Ordos City, China
- Course: Permanent racing facility 2.331 mi (3.751 km)
- Laps: 30 & 29
Pole position
Team	(Greece) Olympiacos CFP	Ben Hanley
- Time: 1:30.347
Podium (1st race)
First	(Greece) Olympiacos CFP	Ben Hanley
Second	(Switzerland) FC Basel 1893	Max Wissel
Third	(Portugal) F.C. Porto	Earl Bamber
Fastest lap (1st race)
Team	(Greece) Olympiacos CFP	Ben Hanley
- Time: 1:30.021 (on lap 28)
Podium (2nd race)
First	(England) Liverpool F.C.	Frédéric Vervisch
Second	(Switzerland) FC Basel 1893	Max Wissel
Third	(Brazil) CR Flamengo	Andy Soucek
Fastest lap (2nd race)
Team	(Greece) Olympiacos CFP	Ben Hanley
- Time: 1:30.740 (on lap 28)

The 2010 Ordos Superleague Formula round was a Superleague Formula round held on October 3, 2010, at the newly built Ordos International Circuit, Ordos City, China. It was Superleague Formula's first visit to China, and is followed the week after by a round through the streets of Beijing. It was the tenth round of the 2010 Superleague Formula season.

Eighteen clubs took part including Chinese club Beijing Guoan. A nineteenth car, one of a Team China also took part for the first time in the series. This meant the largest ever grid for a race weekend in Superleague Formula.

Support races for the event were from the Polo Star Cup.

== Results ==
=== Qualifying ===
- In each group, the top four qualify for the quarter-finals.

==== Group A ====
BEI - John Martin TOT - Craig Dolby ACM - Yelmer Buurman ASR - Julien Jousse LFC - Frédéric Vervisch FCP - Earl Bamber COR - Robert Doornbos ATM - Bruno Méndez LYO - Tristan Gommendy

==== Group B ====
CHI - Ma Qing Hua AND - Davide Rigon FCB - Max Wissel OLY - Ben Hanley FLA - Andy Soucek GAL - Giacomo Ricci SCP - Adrián Vallés SEV - Marcos Martínez GDB - Franck Perera PSV - Adderly Fong

== Standings after the round ==
Pos	Team	Points
1	(Belgium) R.S.C. Anderlecht	635
2	(Switzerland) FC Basel 1893	628
3	(Greece) Olympiacos CFP	616
4	(England) Tottenham Hotspur	616
5	(Italy) A.C. Milan	591
