= 2010 Beijing Superleague Formula round =

2010 Beijing Superleague Formula round Superleague Formula round China
- Circuit Map
- Date: October 10, 2010
- Location: Beijing International Street Circuit, Beijing, China
- Course: Street circuit 1.691 mi (2.721 km)
- Laps: 31 & 27
Pole position
Team	(Portugal) F.C. Porto	Álvaro Parente
- Time: 1:05.287
Podium (1st race)
First	(England) Tottenham Hotspur	Craig Dolby
Second	(France) GD Bordeaux	Franck Perera
Third	(England) Liverpool F.C.	Frédéric Vervisch
Fastest lap (1st race)
Team	(England) Liverpool F.C.	Frédéric Vervisch
- Time: 1:05.058 (on lap 27)
Podium (2nd race)
First	(Portugal) F.C. Porto	Álvaro Parente
Second	(Netherlands) PSV Eindhoven	Earl Bamber
Third	(Italy) A.C. Milan	Yelmer Buurman
Fastest lap (2nd race)
Team	(England) Liverpool F.C.	Frédéric Vervisch
- Time: 1:05.719 (on lap 15)

The 2010 Beijing Superleague Formula round was a Superleague Formula round held on October 10, 2010, at the Beijing International Street Circuit, Beijing, China. It was Superleague Formula's second visit to China, after previously visiting the Ordos International Circuit the week before. It was also the first time the championship raced on a street circuit. It was a non-championship event, after the track failed to gain the required FIA Grade 2 status in order to host a championship event. It was originally scheduled to be the eleventh round of the 2010 Superleague Formula season.

Nineteen cars took part including Chinese outfits Beijing Guoan and Team China.

Support races for the event were from the China Touring Car Championship.

== Report ==
=== Super Final ===
- The race was cancelled due to poor track and weather conditions.

== Results ==
=== Qualifying ===
- In each group, the top four qualify for the quarter-finals.

== Standings after the round ==
Pos	Team	Points
1	(Belgium) R.S.C. Anderlecht	635
2	(Switzerland) FC Basel 1893	628
3	(Greece) Olympiacos CFP	616
4	(England) Tottenham Hotspur	616
5	(Italy) A.C. Milan	591
