= FC Porto (Superleague Formula team) =

F.C. Porto SF Racing Team
Founded	2008
Country	Portugal
Driver(s)	Tristan Gommendy ('08, '09); Álvaro Parente ('09, '10); Earl Bamber (2010)
First race	2008 Donington
Last race	2010 Navarra
Rounds	24
Ch'ships	0
Total points	1074 (including Super Finals)
2010 position	7th (495 pts)
Races / Poles / Wins / Podiums / F. Laps; 47 / 1 / 6 / 9 / 3
NOTE - Data not including Super Finals

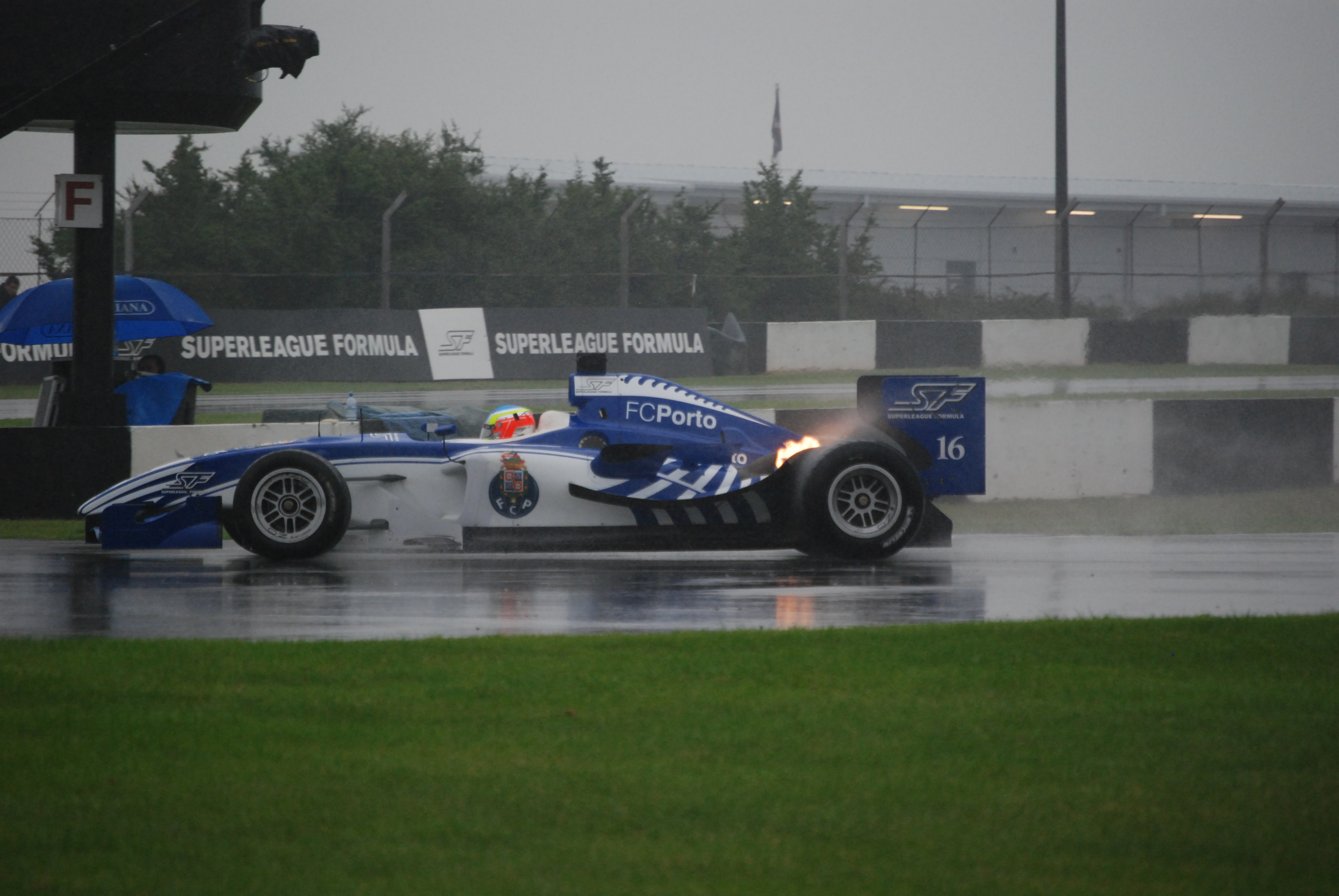
Tristan Gommendy lapping around Donington Park in the wet in 2008

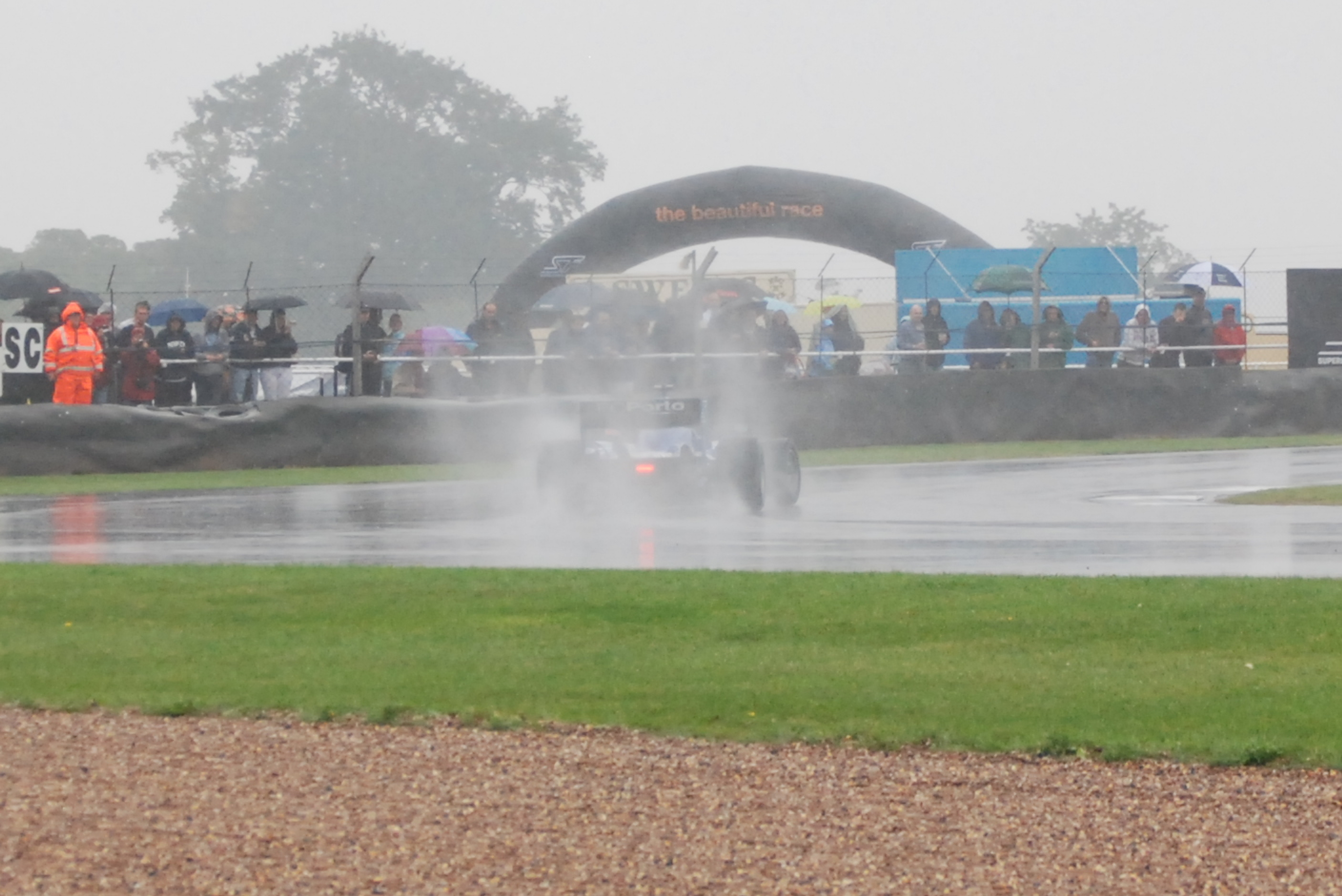
Tristan Gommendy driving in the rain during the second 2008 Donington race.

F.C. Porto Superleague Formula team was the racing team of F.C. Porto, a football team that competes in Portugal in the Portuguese Liga. F.C. Porto racing team competed in the Superleague Formula. They were operated by Alan Docking Racing in the 2008 season, by Hitech Junior Team in the 2009 season and by Atech GP/Reid Motorsport in the 2010 season.

== 2008 season ==
In the 2008 Superleague Formula season F.C. Porto finished 7th overall in the table with 277 points. French driver Tristan Gommendy was the F.C. Porto driver for all rounds, winning one race in the 2008 Vallelunga round.

== 2009 season ==
For the 2009 Superleague Formula season, Tristan Gommendy was confirmed as the driver once again, but this time together with Álvaro Parente the team finished 5th overall in the table with 302 points.

== 2010 season ==
F.C. Porto returned for the 2010 Superleague Formula season with Álvaro Parente and Earl Bamber as the drivers. They finished 7th overall with 495 points.

== Record ==
(key)

=== 2008 ===
Operator(s)	Driver(s)	1		2		3		4		5		6		Points	Rank
Operator(s)	Driver(s)	DON		NÜR		ZOL		EST		VAL		JER		Points	Rank
Alan Docking Racing	(France) Tristan Gommendy	7	9	8	5	6	15	16	DN					277	7th
Hitech Junior Team	(France) Tristan Gommendy									8	1	2	12	277	7th

=== 2009 ===
- Super Final results in 2009 did not count for points towards the main championship.

Operator(s)	Driver(s)	1			2			3			4			5			6			Points	Rank
Operator(s)	Driver(s)	MAG			ZOL			DON			EST			MOZ			JAR			Points	Rank
Hitech Junior Team	(France) Tristan Gommendy	16	7	X	12	7	–	8	1	5				7	13	–	6	5	5	302	5th
Hitech Junior Team	(Portugal) Álvaro Parente										16	1	X							302	5th

=== 2010 ===
Operator(s)	Driver(s)	1			2			3			4			5			6			7			8			9			10			NC			11			Points	Rank
Operator(s)	Driver(s)	SIL			ASS			MAG			JAR			NÜR			ZOL			BRH			ADR			POR			ORD			BEI			NAV			Points	Rank
Atech/Reid Motorsport	(Portugal) Álvaro Parente	4	5	5	11	16	X	5	11	X	8	11	X	17	1	X	11	12	X	11	4	6	6	11	X	3	17	X				15	1	C	8	1	6	495	7th
Atech/Reid Motorsport	(New Zealand) Earl Bamber																												3	12	1							495	7th
