= Beijing International Street Circuit =

Motorsport track in Beijing, China

- Street Circuit (2010)
- Location: Beijing, China
- Coordinates: 40°10′25″N 116°41′12″E
- Opened: 8 October 2010; 15 years ago
- Closed: 10 October 2010; 15 years ago
- Major events: Superleague Formula (2010); China Touring Car Championship (2010)

Street Circuit (2010)
- Length: 2.721 km (1.691 mi)
- Turns: 15
- Race lap record: 1:05.058 ( (Belgium) Frédéric Vervisch, Panoz DP09, 2010, Superleague Formula)

The Beijing International Street Circuit was a clockwise street circuit located at the Shunyi Olympic Rowing-Canoeing Park, in Beijing, China.

== History ==
To keep the success of Olympic Games, the Shunyi District decided to invest 300 million yuan to build facilities for motorsport. The circuit opened in October 2010, when it hosted a non-championship round of the 2010 Superleague Formula season.

== Lap records ==
The fastest official race lap records at the Beijing International Street Circuit are listed as:

Category	Time	Driver	Vehicle	Event
Street Circuit (2010): 2.721 km (1.691 mi)
Superleague Formula	1:05.058	Frédéric Vervisch	Panoz DP09	2010 Beijing Superleague Formula round
Super 2000	1:23.351	He Hanqiang	Honda Accord CTCC	2010 Beijing CTCC round
Super 1600	1:31.098	Cui Yue	Hyundai i30 CTCC	2010 Beijing CTCC round
