= 2010 Portimão Superleague Formula round =

2010 Portimão Superleague Formula round Superleague Formula round Portugal
- Circuit Map
- Date: September 19, 2010
- Location: Autódromo Internacional do Algarve, Portimão, Portugal
- Course: Permanent racing facility 2.905 mi (4.675 km)
- Laps: 29 & 29
Pole position
Team	(China) Beijing Guoan	John Martin
- Time: 1:33.149
Podium (1st race)
First	(China) Beijing Guoan	John Martin
Second	(Belgium) R.S.C. Anderlecht	Davide Rigon
Third	(Portugal) F.C. Porto	Álvaro Parente
Fastest lap (1st race)
Team	(Turkey) Galatasaray S.K.	Andy Soucek
- Time: 1:31.935 (on lap 15)
Podium (2nd race)
First	(Greece) Olympiacos CFP	Neel Jani
Second	(France) Olympique Lyonnais	Tristan Gommendy
Third	(Brazil) SC Corinthians	Robert Doornbos
Fastest lap (2nd race)
Team	(France) Olympique Lyonnais	Tristan Gommendy
- Time: 1:32.578 (on lap 12)

The 2010 Portimão Superleague Formula round was a Superleague Formula round held on September 19, 2010, at the Autódromo Internacional do Algarve circuit, Portimão, Portugal. It was Superleague Formula's first visit to the circuit after visits in previous years to the country's Estoril circuit. It was the ninth round of the 2010 Superleague Formula season.

Eighteen clubs took part including Portuguese clubs F.C. Porto and Sporting CP.

Support races included the prestigious FIA GT1 World Championship as well as the FIA GT3 European Championship and GT4 European Cup.

== Results ==
=== Qualifying ===
- In each group, the top four qualify for the quarter-finals.

== Standings after the round ==
Pos	Team	Points
1	(Belgium) R.S.C. Anderlecht	576
2	(England) Tottenham Hotspur	562
3	(Switzerland) FC Basel 1893	537
4	(Italy) A.C. Milan	533
5	(Greece) Olympiacos CFP	528
