= Frédéric Vervisch =

Belgian racing driver (born 1986)

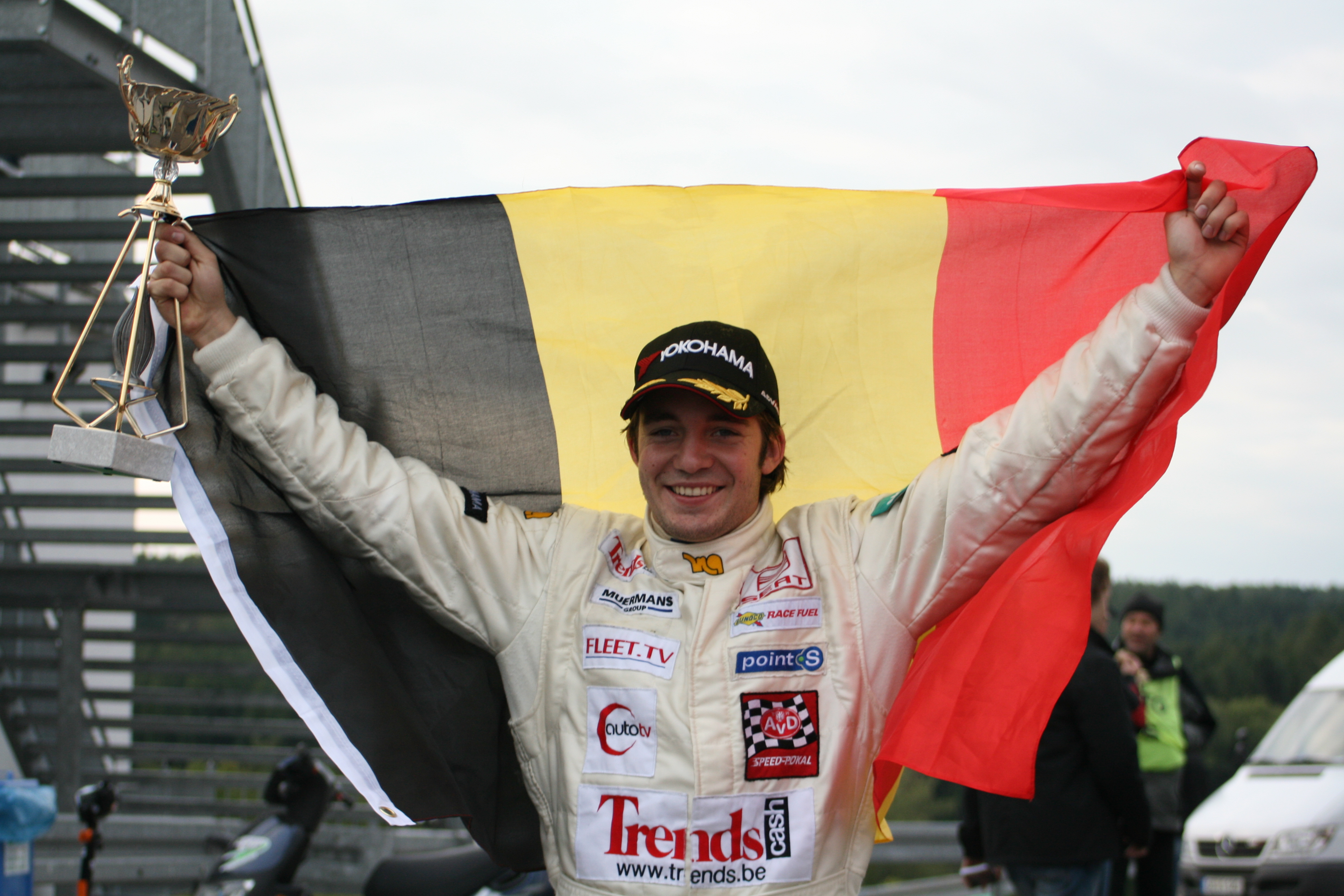
- Celebrating the 2008 German F3 title
- Nationality: (Belgium) Belgian
- Born: 10 August 1986 (age 40) Roeselare, Belgium

Superleague Formula career
- Debut season: 2010
- Current team: Luxembourg
- Categorisation: FIA Gold
- Car number: 5
- Former teams: Liverpool FC
- Starts: 12
- Wins: 2
- Poles: 0
- Fastest laps: 3

Previous series
- 2010 2009 2007–08 2007–08 2006 2005 2004: Italian F3; Atlantic Championship; German F3; Asian F3; Formula Renault 2.0 NEC; Formula Renault 3.5; Formula Three French Cup

Championship titles
- 2008 2007–08: German F3 Champion; Asian F3 Champion

Awards
- 2009: Atlantic Championship; Rookie of the Year

Frédéric Vervisch (/ˈvɜːrvɪʃ/ VUR-vish; born 10 August 1986) is a Belgian professional racing driver. He has competed internationally in touring cars and GT racing, including the World Touring Car Cup and GT World Challenge Europe. In 2025 he is racing in the IMSA SportsCar Championship GTD Pro class with Ford Multimatic Motorsports and has previously won the 24 Hours of Nürburgring in 2019 and 2022.

== Career ==
=== Early career ===
A winner of numerous karting championships, Vervisch moved to auto racing in 2003 making a single start in the Formula Three French Cup and immediately won upon his debut. Following that initial success, he participated in the entire 2004 Formula Three French Cup championship and finished runner-up.

=== Formula Renault ===
In 2005, Vervisch moved to the Formula Renault 3.5 series, participating with GD Racing in four rounds with a best result of 12th in Zolder in a race won by Robert Kubica. The season ended after round 4 in Le Mans when it became clear that his sponsor Kizz-Me was not fulfilling its financial obligations, a fraud that the same company committed again against a WRC driver and his team in 2006.

In 2006, the 19-year-old Vervisch took a step back and competed full-time in Formula Renault 2.0 Northern European Cup with SL Formula Racing, finishing 9th in points and scoring a season-best fifth place at the Anderstorp round.

=== Formula Three ===
In 2007, Vervisch moved to the German Formula Three Championship with JB Motorsport and finished runner-up to Carlo van Dam, taking four wins and eleven podiums.

That winter, Vervisch entered the Asian F3 Championship with Team Goddard, winning the title with eleven victories.

In 2008, Vervisch returned to German F3 with Swiss Racing Team; he switched to Jo Zeller Racing mid-season and won the championship with seven race wins.

In 2010, Vervisch decided to go back to Europe and race with RC Motorsport in the Italian F3 Championship. He scored a season-best third-place finish at Imola but left the championship at the next round in Mugello after having suffered two engine failures before even the start of the first race, and the subsequent team decision to withdraw from the race.

=== Atlantic Championship ===
In 2009 after having won the 2008 German F3 title, Vervisch moved to the United States where he competed in the Atlantic Championship for Genoa Racing. He finished fourth in the championship standings with four podium finishes and grabbed the Rookie of the Year title.

=== Superleague Formula ===
On 5 September 2010, Vervisch made his debut in Superleague Formula after receiving an invitation by Atech-Reid to drive the Liverpool FC car at the Adria round. In the race, he overtook his teammate Yelmer Buurman and Robert Doornbos, and secured a slot in the Super Final. Vervisch continued his successful series debut at the next round in Portimão where he was crowned the overall weekend winner in the Super Final. He took his pace to the inaugural Superleague Formula China rounds in Ordos where he first suffered an engine failure in race 1 but then recovered with a victory in race 2 and in the streets of Beijing where Vervisch scored a double podium finish – in race 1 and then the overall third spot for the weekend. At the final round of the Superleague Formula season in Navarra Vervisch didn't reach the finish line due to mechanical failures in both races.

=== Veranstaltergemeinschaft Langstreckenmeisterschaft Nürburgring (VLN) ===
On 20–23 June 2019, Vervisch won the 24 Hours of the Nürburgring for Phoenix Racing in an Audi R8 LMS (GT3), sharing with Dries Vanthoor, Pierre Kaffer and Frank Stippler.

== Racing record ==
=== Career summary ===
Season	Series	Team name	Races	Wins	Poles	F/Laps	Podiums	Points	Position
2003	French Formula 3 Cup	JMP Racing	1	1	?	?	1	?	?
2004	French Formula 3 Cup	JMP Racing	6	4	?	?	5	139	**2nd**
2005	Formula Renault 3.5 Series	GD Racing	7	0	0	0	0	0	30th
2006	Formula Renault 2.0 NEC	SL Formula Racing	16	0	0	1	0	152	9th
2006	Eurocup Formula Renault 2.0	SL Formula Racing	4	0	0	0	0	0	42nd
2007	German Formula 3 Championship	JB Motorsport	18	4	1	7	11	127	**2nd**
2007	Formula Renault 3.5 Series	GD Racing	4	0	0	0	0	0	30th
2007	V de V Challenge Sprint - Proto	JMP Racing	2	0	0	0	2	73.5	12th
2007–08	Asian Formula 3 Championship	Team Goddard	18	11	10	15	17	322	**1st**
2008	German Formula 3 Championship	Swiss Racing Team	10	2	0	1	5	120	**1st**
2008	German Formula 3 Championship	Jo Zeller Racing	6	5	4	5	5	120	**1st**
2008	Formula 3 Euro Series	RC Motorsport	2	0	0	0	0	N/A	NC†
2009	Atlantic Championship	Genoa Racing	12	0	0	0	4	131	4th
2010	Italian Formula 3 Championship	RC Motorsport	7	0	0	0	1	20	14th
2010	Superleague Formula	Liverpool FC	12	2	0	3	3	439‡	10th‡
2011	Superleague Formula	Luxembourg	5	1	0	1	3	134‡	**3rd**‡
2012	V de V Challenge Endurance Moderne - Proto	JMP Racing	1	0	0	0	0	5	45th
2013	FIA GT Series	Boutsen Ginion Racing	2	0	0	0	0	N/A	NC†
2013	Blancpain Endurance Series - Pro-Am	Boutsen Ginion Racing	4	1	0	0	1	40	8th
2014	Blancpain Sprint Series	Boutsen Ginion Racing	2	0	0	0	0	8	24th
2014	Blancpain Endurance Series - Pro-Am	Boutsen Ginion Racing	4	0	0	0	0	0	NC
2015	Blancpain Sprint Series	Belgian Audi Club Team WRT	2	0	0	0	2	21	19th
2015	Blancpain Endurance Series - Pro	ISR	5	0	0	0	0	18	15th
2015	Stock Car Brasil	Cavaleiro Racing	1	0	0	0	0	N/A	NC†
2016	Blancpain GT Series Sprint Cup	Belgian Audi Club Team WRT	10	1	0	1	3	58	5th
2016	Blancpain GT Series Endurance Cup	Belgian Audi Club Team WRT	5	0	0	0	2	45	8th
2016	Intercontinental GT Challenge	Audi Sport Team WRT	1	0	0	0	0	8	17th
2016	24 Hours of Nürburgring - SP9	Audi Sport Team WRT	1	0	0	0	0	N/A	8th
2016	ADAC GT Masters	Montaplast by Land-Motorsport	8	0	0	0	0	24	28th
2016	European Le Mans Series - LMP2	Eurasia Motorsport	1	0	0	0	0	10	25th
2016	V de V Challenge Endurance - GT	WRT	1	0	0	0	0	0	NC
2016–17	Asian Le Mans Series - GT	DH Racing	1	0	0	1	0	12	13th
2017	TCR International Series	Comtoyou Racing	16	0	1	1	1	84	10th
2017	TCR BeNeLux Touring Car Championship	Comtoyou Racing	3	0	0	0	1	33	27th
2017	Intercontinental GT Challenge	Audi Sport Team WRT	1	0	0	0	0	10	11th
2017	Blancpain GT Series Sprint Cup	Audi Sport Team WRT	2	0	0	0	0	0	NC
2017	24 Hours of Nürburgring - SP9	Audi Sport Team WRT	1	0	0	0	0	N/A	DNF
2017	Blancpain GT Series Endurance Cup	Audi Sport Team WRT	2	0	0	0	0	20	17th
2017	Blancpain GT Series Endurance Cup	GRT Grasser Racing Team	1	0	0	0	0	20	17th
2018	World Touring Car Cup	Audi Sport Team Comtoyou	30	1	0	1	7	228	9th
2018	ADAC GT Masters	Aust Motorsport	11	0	0	0	0	4	39th
2018	Blancpain GT Series Sprint Cup	Belgian Audi Club Team WRT	2	1	1	0	1	25	10th
2018	Blancpain GT Series Endurance Cup	Belgian Audi Club Team WRT	1	0	0	0	0	18	25th
2018	Blancpain GT Series Endurance Cup	Audi Sport Team Saintéloc	1	0	0	0	0	18	25th
2018	Le Mans Cup - GT3	Spirit of Race	2	0	0	1	0	12	10th
2018	F4 Chinese Championship	Freely Racing Team	3	0	0	0	0	0	NC†
2018	Intercontinental GT Challenge	Audi Sport Team MPC	1	0	1	0	0	37	7th
2018	Intercontinental GT Challenge	Audi Sport Team Saintéloc	1	1	0	0	1	37	7th
2018	Intercontinental GT Challenge	Audi Sport Team WRT	1	0	0	1	0	37	7th
2018	24H GT Series - A6	Comtoyou Racing							
2018	24 Hours of Nürburgring - SP9	Audi Sport Team Phoenix	1	0	0	0	0	N/A	6th
2019	World Touring Car Cup	Comtoyou Team Audi Sport	30	1	1	4	5	194	12th
2019	Blancpain GT Series Sprint Cup	Phoenix Racing	10	0	0	0	0	11	16th
2019	ADAC GT Masters	BWT Mücke Motorsport	6	0	0	0	0	16	28th
2019	Blancpain GT Series Endurance Cup	Audi Sport Team Saintéloc	1	0	0	0	0	12	19th
2019	IMSA SportsCar Championship - GTD	WRT Speedstar Audi Sport	1	0	0	0	1	30	47th
2019	Intercontinental GT Challenge	Audi Sport Team Valvoline	1	0	0	0	0	53	5th
2019	Intercontinental GT Challenge	Audi Sport Team WRT	3	1	0	0	1	53	5th
2019	Intercontinental GT Challenge	Audi Sport Team Saintéloc	1	0	0	0	1	53	5th
2019	24H GT Series - A6	Car Collection Motorsport							
2019	24 Hours of Nürburgring - SP9	Audi Sport Team Phoenix	1	1	0	0	1	N/A	**1st**
2020	GT World Challenge Europe Sprint Cup	Attempto Racing	8	1	0	0	1	30.5	10th
2020	GT World Challenge Europe Endurance Cup	Attempto Racing	4	0	1	1	1	26	12th
2020	ADAC GT Masters	Team WRT	4	0	0	0	0	11	35th
2020	Intercontinental GT Challenge	Audi Sport Team Valvoline	1	0	0	0	0	36	4th
2020	Intercontinental GT Challenge	Audi Sport Team Attempto Racing	1	0	0	0	1	36	4th
2020	Intercontinental GT Challenge	Audi Sport Team WRT	1	0	0	0	1	36	4th
2020	24 Hours of Nürburgring - SP9	Audi Sport Team Phoenix	1	0	0	0	0	N/A	5th
2021	World Touring Car Cup	Comtoyou Team Audi Sport	16	2	1	5	5	195	**2nd**
2021	GT World Challenge Europe Sprint Cup	Saintéloc Racing	8	0	0	0	0	19.5	16th
2021	GT World Challenge Europe Endurance Cup	Saintéloc Racing	3	0	0	0	0	3	29th
2022	GT World Challenge Europe Sprint Cup	Monster VR46 with Team WRT	10	0	0	0	0	8	16th
2022	GT World Challenge Europe Endurance Cup	Monster VR46 with Team WRT	5	0	0	0	0	30	16th
2022	TCR Europe Touring Car Series	Audi Sport Team Comtoyou	2	0	0	0	1	57	16th
2022	ADAC GT Masters	Seyffarth Motorsport	1	0	0	0	0	0	NC†
2022	24H GT Series - GT3	Belgian Audi Club Team WRT							
2022	24 Hours of Nürburgring - SP9	Audi Sport Team Phoenix	1	1	0	0	1	N/A	**1st**
2022-23	Middle East Trophy - GT3	HAAS RT							
2023	GT World Challenge Europe Sprint Cup	Comtoyou Racing	10	0	0	0	1	27.5	8th
2023	GT World Challenge Europe Endurance Cup	Comtoyou Racing	5	0	0	0	0	8	19th
2023	TCR World Tour	Audi Sport Team Comtoyou	20	1	0	2	6	347	4th
2023	TCR Europe Touring Car Series	Audi Sport Team Comtoyou	6	0	0	0	2	0	NC†
2023	TCR Italy Touring Car Championship	Audi Sport Team Comtoyou	2	0	0	0	1	0	NC†
2023	TCR South America Touring Car Championship	Audi Sport Team Comtoyou	4	0	0	0	1	0	NC†
2023	TCR Australia Touring Car Series	Audi Sport Team Comtoyou	6	0	0	1	1	0	NC†
2023	24H GT Series - GT3	HAAS RT							
2023	24 Hours of Nürburgring - SP9	Audi Sport Team Scherer PHX	1	0	0	0	0	N/A	DNF
2024	GT World Challenge Europe Endurance Cup	Proton Competition	5	0	0	0	0	1	31st
2024	IMSA SportsCar Championship - GTD Pro	Ford Multimatic Motorsports	3	0	0	0	0	770	22nd
2024	Nürburgring Langstrecken-Serie - SP9	Scherer Sport PHX							
2024	24 Hours of Nürburgring - SP9	Scherer Sport PHX							
2025	IMSA SportsCar Championship - GTD Pro	Ford Multimatic Motorsports	10	1	0	0	1	2714	8th
2026	IMSA SportsCar Championship - GTD Pro	Ford Racing	10	1	0	0	3	2825	5th
2026	Nürburgring Langstrecken-Serie - SP9	HRT Ford Racing							
2026	24 Hours of Nürburgring - SP9	HRT Ford Racing	1	0	0	0	0	N/A	6th
2026	Intercontinental GT Challenge	HRT Ford Racing	1	0	0	0	0	28*	10th*
2026	Intercontinental GT Challenge	Miedecke Motorsport by Team MPC	1	0	1	0	1	28*	10th*

^{‡} Team standings. ^{†} As Vervisch was a guest driver, he was ineligible to score points. ^{*} Season still in progress.

=== Complete Formula Renault 3.5 Series results ===
(key) (Races in bold indicate pole position) (Races in italics indicate fastest lap)

Year	Team	1	2	3	4	5	6	7	8	9	10	11	12	13	14	15	16	17	Pos	Points
2005	GD Racing	ZOL; 1; 19	ZOL; 1; 12	MON; 1 Ret	VAL; 1; 19	VAL; 2; 17	LMS; 1 Ret	LMS; 2; 20	BIL; 1	BIL; 2	OSC; 1	OSC; 2	DON; 1	DON; 2	EST; 1	EST; 2	MNZ; 1	MNZ; 2	30th	0
2007	GD Racing	MNZ; 1	MNZ; 2	NÜR; 1	NÜR; 2	MON; 1	HUN; 1	HUN; 2	SPA; 1	SPA; 2	DON; 1	DON; 2	MAG; 1	MAG; 2	EST; 1; 14	EST; 2 Ret	CAT; 1; 21	CAT; 2; 12	30th	0

=== Complete Formula Renault 2.0 NEC results ===
(key) (Races in bold indicate pole position) (Races in italics indicate fastest lap)

Year	Entrant	1	2	3	4	5	6	7	8	9	10	11	12	13	14	15	16	DC	Points
2006	SL Formula Racing	OSC; 1; 11	OSC; 2; 8	SPA; 1; 9	SPA; 2; 13	NÜR; 1 Ret	NÜR; 2; 21	ZAN; 1; 11	ZAN; 2; 10	OSC; 1; 14	OSC; 2; 17	ASS; 1; 6	ASS; 2; 7	AND; 1; 8	AND; 2; 5	SAL; 1; 8	SAL; 2; 15	9th	152

=== Complete Eurocup Formula Renault 2.0 results ===
(key) (Races in bold indicate pole position; races in italics indicate fastest lap)

Year	Entrant	1	2	3	4	5	6	7	8	9	10	11	12	13	14	DC	Points
2006	SL Formula Racing	ZOL; 1; 23	ZOL; 2 Ret	IST; 1 DSQ	IST; 2 Ret	MIS; 1	MIS; 2	NÜR; 1	NÜR; 2	DON; 1	DON; 2	LMS; 1	LMS; 2	CAT; 1	CAT; 2	42nd	0

=== Atlantic Championship results ===
(key) (Races in bold indicate pole position) (Races in italics indicate fastest lap)

Year	Team	SEB	MIL	NJ1	NJ2	LRP	ACC1	ACC2	MID	CTR	MOS	ATL	LAG	Position	Points
2009	Genoa Racing	2	3	7	3	6	4	4	5	9	3	6	3	**4th** †	**131**

† Vervisch finished the season as Rookie of the Year

=== Superleague Formula results ===
(key) (Races in bold indicate pole position) (Races in italics indicate fastest lap)

Year	Team	Operator	ADR			POR			ORD			BEI			NAV		
Year	Team	Operator	R1	R2	S	R1	R2	S	R1	R2	S	R1	R2	S	R1	R2	S
2010	Liverpool FC	Atech-Reid	7	5	6	4	6	1	Ret	1	X	3	7	C †	16	Ret	X

NOTE – R2 starts
with reverse grid
S = Super Final † The Super Final at the Beijing round was cancelled but Vervisch was classified as 3rd overall

=== Complete GT World Challenge Europe results ===
==== GT World Challenge Europe Endurance Cup ====
(Races in bold indicate pole position) (Races in italics indicate fastest lap)

Year	Team	Car	Class	1	2	3	4	5	6	7	Pos.	Points
2013	Boutsen Ginion	McLaren MP4-12C GT3	Pro-Am	MNZ; Ret	SIL	LEC; 11	SPA; 6H; 54	SPA; 12H; Ret	SPA; 24H; Ret	NÜR; 15	8th	40
2014	Boutsen Ginion	McLaren MP4-12C GT3	Pro-Am	MNZ; Ret	SIL; 35	LEC; 21	SPA; 6H; 58	SPA; 12H; 58	SPA; 24H; Ret	NÜR	NC	0
2015	ISR	Audi R8 LMS ultra	Pro	MNZ; 20	SIL; 4	LEC; 9	SPA; 6H; 51	SPA; 12H; 51	SPA; 24H; Ret	NÜR; 12	15th*	18*
2016	Belgian Audi Club Team WRT	Audi R8 LMS	Pro	MNZ; 9	SIL; 2	LEC; 19	SPA; 6H; 3	SPA; 12H; 35	SPA; 24H; 29	NÜR; 2	8th*	45*
2017	Belgian Audi Club Team WRT	Audi R8 LMS	Pro	MNZ	SIL	LEC; 8	SPA; 6H; 4	SPA; 12H; 10	SPA; 24H; 5		15th*	20*
2017	GRT Grasser Racing Team	Lamborghini Huracán GT3	Pro							CAT; 31	15th*	20*
2018	Belgian Audi Club Team WRT	Audi R8 LMS	Pro	MNZ	SIL	LEC; 12				CAT	25th*	18*
2018	Audi Sport Team Saintéloc	Audi R8 LMS	Pro				SPA; 6H; 16	SPA; 12H; 4	SPA; 24H; 4		25th*	18*
2019	Audi Sport Team Saintéloc	Audi R8 LMS Evo	Pro	MNZ	SIL	LEC	SPA; 6H; 12	SPA; 12H; 10	SPA; 24H; 4	CAT	19th*	12*
2020	Attempto Racing	Audi R8 LMS Evo	Pro	IMO; 36	NÜR; Ret	SPA; 6H; 5	SPA; 12H; 10	SPA; 24H; 2	LEC; 9		12th*	26*
2021	Saintéloc Racing	Audi R8 LMS Evo	Pro	MNZ; 9	LEC; 10	SPA; 6H	SPA; 12H	SPA; 24H	NÜR; 17	CAT	29th*	3*
2022	Team WRT	Audi R8 LMS Evo II	Pro	IMO; 17	LEC; 5	SPA; 6H; 12	SPA; 12H; 17	SPA; 24H; 17	HOC; 5	CAT; 6	16th*	30*
2023	Comtoyou Racing	Audi R8 LMS Evo II	Pro	MNZ; Ret	LEC; 42	SPA; 6H; 18	SPA; 12H; 16	SPA; 24H; 8	NÜR; 8	CAT; 49†	19th	8
2024	Proton Competition	Ford Mustang GT3	Pro	LEC; 10	SPA; 6H; 40	SPA; 12H; 13	SPA; 24H; 19	NÜR; 24	MNZ; 20	JED; Ret	31st	1

==== GT World Challenge Europe Sprint Cup ====
Year	Team	Car	Class	1	2	3	4	5	6	7	8	9	10	11	12	13	14	Pos.	Points
2013	Boutsen Ginion	McLaren MP4-12C GT3	Pro	NOG; QR	NOG; CR	ZOL; QR	ZOL; CR	ZAN; QR	ZAN; CR	SVK; QR	SVK; CR	NAV; QR	NAV; CR	BAK; QR; 11	BAK; CR; Ret			NC‡	0‡
2014	Boutsen Ginion	McLaren MP4-12C GT3	Pro	NOG; QR	NOG; CR	BRH; QR	BRH; CR	ZAN; QR	ZAN; CR	SVK; QR	SVK; CR	ALG; QR	ALG; CR	ZOL; QR	ZOL; CR	BAK; QR; 7	BAK; CR; 6	24th	8
2015	Belgian Audi Club Team WRT	Audi R8 LMS ultra	Pro	NOG; QR	NOG; CR	BRH; QR	BRH; CR	ZOL; QR	ZOL; CR	MOS; QR	MOS; CR	ALG; QR	ALG; CR	MIS; QR	MIS; CR	ZAN; QR; 2	ZAN; CR; 3	19th	21
2016	Belgian Audi Club Team WRT	Audi R8 LMS	Pro	**MIS**; **QR**; 3	MIS; CR; 1	BRH; QR; 5	BRH; CR; 15	NÜR; QR; 24	NÜR; CR; 7	HUN; QR; 3	HUN; CR; 8	CAT; QR; 13	CAT; CR; 4					5th	58
2017	Belgian Audi Club Team WRT	Audi R8 LMS	Pro	MIS; QR	MIS; CR	BRH; QR	BRH; CR	ZOL; QR	ZOL; CR	HUN; QR	HUN; CR	NÜR; QR; 14	NÜR; CR; 16					NC	0
2018	Belgian Audi Club Team WRT	Audi R8 LMS	Pro	ZOL; 1	ZOL; 2	BRH; 1; 4	**BRH**; **2**; 1	MIS; 1	MIS; 2	HUN; 1	HUN; 2	NÜR; 1	NÜR; 2					10th	25
2019	Phoenix Racing	Audi R8 LMS	Pro	BRH; 1; 8	BRH; 2; 12	MIS; 1; 10	MIS; 2; 5	ZAN; 1; 8	ZAN; 2; 10	NÜR; 1; 13	NÜR; 2; 25	HUN; 1; 18	HUN; 2; 20					16th	11
2020	Attempto Racing	Audi R8 LMS Evo	Pro	MIS; 1; 6	MIS; 2; 17	MIS; 3; 16	MAG; 1; 4	MAG; 2 Ret	ZAN; 1	ZAN; 2	CAT; 1; 8	CAT; 2; 1	CAT; 3; 16					10th	30.5
2021	Saintéloc Racing	Audi R8 LMS Evo	Pro	MAG; 1; 26	MAG; 2; 6	ZAN; 1; 9	ZAN; 2; 15	MIS; 1; 4	MIS; 2; 10	BRH; 1; 5	BRH; 2; 11	VAL; 1	VAL; 2					16th	19.5
2022	Monster VR46 with Team WRT	Audi R8 LMS Evo II	Pro	BRH; 1; 13	BRH; 2; 8	MAG; 1; 15	MAG; 2; 11	ZAN; 1; 14	ZAN; 2; 16	MIS; 1 Ret	MIS; 2; 5	VAL; 1; 22	VAL; 2 Ret					16th	8
2023	Comtoyou Racing	Audi R8 LMS Evo II	Pro	BRH; 1; 8	BRH; 2; 20	MIS; 1; 4	MIS; 2; 15	HOC; 1; 2	HOC; 2; 16	VAL; 1; 6	VAL; 2; 10	ZAN; 1; 9	ZAN; 2 Ret					8th	27.5

^{‡} As Vervisch was a guest driver, he was ineligible for championship points.

=== Complete TCR International Series results ===
(key) (Races in bold indicate pole position) (Races in italics indicate fastest lap)

Year	Team	Car	1	2	3	4	5	6	7	8	9	10	11	12	13	14	15	16	17	18	19	20	DC	Points
2017	Comtoyou Racing	Audi RS3 LMS TCR	RIM; 1	RIM; 2	BHR; 1	BHR; 2	SPA; 1; 5	SPA; 2; 6	**MNZ**; **1**; 5	MNZ; 2; 3	SAL; 1; 10	SAL; 2 Ret	HUN; 1 Ret	HUN; 2; 20†	OSC; 1; 10	OSC; 2; 6	CHA; 1; 11	CHA; 2; 14	ZHE; 1; 6	ZHE; 2 Ret	DUB; 1; 12	DUB; 2; 4	10th	84

^{†} Driver did not finish the race, but was classified as he completed over 90% of the race distance.

=== Complete World Touring Car Cup results ===
(key) (Races in bold indicate pole position) (Races in italics indicate fastest lap)

Year	Team	Car	1	2	3	4	5	6	7	8	9	10	11	12	13	14	15	16	17	18	19	20	21	22	23	24	25	26	27	28	29	30	DC	Points
2018	Audi Sport Team Comtoyou	Audi RS 3 LMS TCR	MAR; 1 Ret	MAR; 2 Ret	MAR; 3 Ret	HUN; 1; 13	HUN; 2; 17	HUN; 3; 18	GER; 1 Ret	GER; 2; 3	GER; 3; 2	NED; 1 Ret	NED; 2; 9	NED; 3; 3	POR; 1; 10	POR; 2; 17	POR; 3; 6	SVK; 1 Ret	SVK; 2; 7	SVK; 3; 3	CHN; 1; 3	CHN; 2; 6	CHN; 3; 4	WUH; 1; 4	WUH; 2; 6	WUH; 3; 2	JPN; 1; 9	JPN; 2; 11	JPN; 3; 7	MAC; 1; 12	MAC; 2; 1	MAC; 3; 13	9th	228
2019	Comtoyou Team Audi Sport	Audi RS 3 LMS TCR	MAR; 1; 17	MAR; 2; 9	**MAR**; **3**; 2	HUN; 1; 6	HUN; 2; 15	HUN; 3; 12	SVK; 1; 1	SVK; 2 Ret	SVK; 3; 21	NED; 1; 9	NED; 2; 21	NED; 3; 16	GER; 1; 5	GER; 2; 2	GER; 3; 2	POR; 1 DSQ	POR; 2; 12	POR; 3 Ret	CHN; 1; 11	CHN; 2 Ret	CHN; 3; 7	JPN; 1 Ret	JPN; 2; 13	JPN; 3; 11	MAC; 1; 7	MAC; 2; 8	MAC; 3; 15	MAL; 1 Ret	MAL; 2; 25	MAL; 3; 3	12th	194
2021	Comtoyou Team Audi Sport	Audi RS 3 LMS TCR	GER; 1; 15	GER; 2 Ret	POR; 1; 13	POR; 2; 11	ESP; 1; 8	**ESP**; **2**; 1	HUN; 1; 4	HUN; 2; 2	CZE; 1; 13	CZE; 2; 8	FRA; 1; 1	FRA; 2; 4	ITA; 1; 6	ITA; 2; 2	RUS; 1; 6	RUS; 2; 2															2nd	195

=== Complete IMSA SportsCar Championship results ===
(key) (Races in bold indicate pole position; results in italics indicate fastest lap)

Year	Entrant	Class	Make	Engine	1	2	3	4	5	6	7	8	9	10	11	Rank	Points
2019	WRT Speedstar Audi Sport	GTD	Audi R8 LMS Evo	Audi 5.2 L V10	DAY; 3	SEB	MOH	DET	WGL	MOS	LIM	ELK	VIR	LGA	PET	47th	30
2024	Ford Multimatic Motorsports	GTD Pro	Ford Mustang GT3	Ford Coyote 5.4 L V8	DAY; 9	SEB; 8	LGA	DET	WGL	MOS	ELK	VIR	IMS	PET; 6		22nd	770
2025	Ford Multimatic Motorsports	GTD Pro	Ford Mustang GT3	Ford Coyote 5.4 L V8	DAY; 1	SEB; 6	LGA; 8	DET; 10	WGL; 10	MOS; 7	ELK; 5	VIR; 7	IMS; 10	PET; 5		8th	2714
2026	Ford Racing	GTD Pro	Ford Mustang GT3 Evo	Ford Coyote 5.4 L V8	DAY; 7	SEB; 8	LGA; 1	DET; 3	WGL; 10	MOS; 5	ELK; 4	VIR; 3	IMS; 7	PET; 11		5th	2825

=== Complete TCR Europe Touring Car Series results ===
(key) (Races in bold indicate pole position) (Races in italics indicate fastest lap)

Year	Team	Car	1	2	3	4	5	6	7	8	9	10	11	12	13	14	DC	Points
2022	Audi Sport Team Comtoyou	Audi RS 3 LMS TCR	ALG; 1	ALG; 2	LEC; 1	LEC; 2	SPA; 1	SPA; 2	NOR; 1	NOR; 2	NÜR; 1	NÜR; 2	MNZ; 1	MNZ; 2	CAT; 1; 4	CAT; 2; 3	16th	57
2023	Audi Sport Team Comtoyou	Audi RS 3 LMS TCR	ALG; 1; 4	ALG; 2; 3	PAU; 1	PAU; 2	SPA; 1; 6	SPA; 2; 14	HUN; 1; 5	HUN; 2; 3	LEC; 1	LEC; 2	MNZ; 1	MNZ; 2	CAT; 1	CAT; 2	NC‡	0‡

^{‡} Driver was a World Tour full-time entry and was ineligible for points.

=== Complete TCR World Tour results ===
(key) (Races in bold indicate pole position) (Races in italics indicate fastest lap)

Year	Team	Car	1	2	3	4	5	6	7	8	9	10	11	12	13	14	15	16	17	18	19	20	DC	Points
2023	Audi Sport Team Comtoyou	Audi RS 3 LMS TCR	ALG; 1; 4	ALG; 2; 3	SPA; 1; 6	SPA; 2; 14	VAL; 1; 15	VAL; 2; 3	HUN; 1; 5	HUN; 2; 3	ELP; 1; 3	ELP; 2; 5	VIL; 1; 19	VIL; 2; 5	SYD; 1; 5	SYD; 2; 3	SYD; 3; 4	BAT; 1; 7	BAT; 2; 7	BAT; 3; 7	MAC; 1; 5	MAC; 2; 1	4th	347

=== Complete 24 Hours of Spa results ===
Year	Team	Co-Drivers	Car	Class	Laps	Pos.	Class Pos.
2013	(Belgium) Boutsen Ginion	(Belgium) David Dermont (France) Grégory Guilvert (Belgium) Koen Wauters	McLaren MP4-12C GT3	Pro-Am Cup	93	DNF	DNF
2014	(Belgium) Boutsen Ginion	(Luxembourg) Olivier Grotz (Saudi Arabia) Karim Ojjeh (Italy) Giorgio Pantano	McLaren MP4-12C GT3	Pro-Am Cup	46	DNF	DNF
2015	(Czech Republic) ISR	(Italy) Marco Bonanomi (Czech Republic) Filip Salaquarda	Audi R8 LMS Ultra	Pro Cup	76	DNF	DNF
2016	(Belgium) Belgian Audi Club Team WRT	(United Kingdom) Will Stevens (Belgium) Dries Vanthoor	Audi R8 LMS	Pro Cup	514	29th	19th
2017	(Belgium) Belgian Audi Club Team WRT	(United States) Connor De Phillippi (Germany) Christopher Mies	Audi R8 LMS	Pro Cup	546	5th	5th
2018	(France) Audi Sport Team Saintéloc	(Germany) Christopher Haase (Germany) Markus Winkelhock	Audi R8 LMS	Pro Cup	511	4th	4th
2019	(France) Audi Sport Team Saintéloc	(Germany) Christopher Haase (Germany) Markus Winkelhock	Audi R8 LMS	Pro Cup	363	4th	4th
2020	(Germany) Attempto Racing	(Italy) Mattia Drudi (Switzerland) Patric Niederhauser	Audi R8 LMS	Pro Cup	527	2nd	2nd
2022	(Italy) Monster VR46 with Team WRT	(Switzerland) Nico Müller (Italy) Valentino Rossi	Audi R8 LMS Evo II	Pro Cup	531	17th	14th
2023	(Belgium) Audi Sport Team Comtoyou	(Germany) Christopher Haase (Belgium) Gilles Magnus	Audi R8 LMS Evo II	Pro Cup	537	8th	8th
2024	(Germany) Proton Competition	(Germany) Christopher Mies (Norway) Dennis Olsen	Ford Mustang GT3	Pro Cup	475	19th	12th

=== Complete 24 Hours of Nürburgring results ===
Year	Team	Co-Drivers	Car	Class	Laps	Pos.	Class Pos.
2016	(Belgium) Audi Sport Team WRT	(Netherlands) Robin Frijns (United Kingdom) Stuart Leonard (Sweden) Edward Sandström	Audi R8 LMS	SP9	130	8th	8th
2017	(Germany) Audi Sport Team WRT	(Switzerland) Nico Müller (Germany) René Rast (Germany) Frank Stippler	Audi R8 LMS	SP9	32	DNF	DNF
2018	(Germany) Audi Sport Team Phoenix	(Germany) Christopher Haase (Switzerland) Nico Müller (Germany) Frank Stippler	Audi R8 LMS	SP9 GT3	133	7th	6th
2019	(Germany) Audi Sport Team Phoenix	(Germany) Pierre Kaffer (Germany) Frank Stippler (Belgium) Dries Vanthoor	Audi R8 LMS	SP9	157	**1st**	**1st**
2020	(Germany) Audi Sport Team Phoenix	(Switzerland) Nico Müller (Germany) Frank Stippler (Belgium) Dries Vanthoor	Audi R8 LMS	SP9 PRO	85	5th	5th
2021	(Germany) Audi Sport Team Land	(South Africa) Kelvin van der Linde (Germany) Christopher Mies (Germany) Rene Rast	Audi R8 LMS Evo	SP9 PRO	47	DNF	DNF
2022	(Germany) Audi Sport Team Phoenix	(Netherlands) Robin Frijns (South Africa) Kelvin van der Linde (Belgium) Dries Vanthoor	Audi R8 LMS Evo	SP9 PRO	159	**1st**	**1st**
2023	(Germany) Audi Sport Team Scherer PHX	(San Marino) Mattia Drudi (Switzerland) Ricardo Feller (Denmark) Dennis Lind	Audi R8 LMS Evo II	SP9 PRO	80	DNF	DNF
2024	(Germany) Scherer Sport PHX	(Switzerland) Ricardo Feller (Germany) Christopher Haase (Germany) Markus Winkelhock	Audi R8 LMS Evo II	SP9 PRO	50	8th	8th
2026	(Germany) HRT Ford Racing	(Germany) Christopher Mies (Norway) Dennis Olsen (Germany) Frank Stippler	Ford Mustang GT3 Evo	SP9 PRO	155	7th	6th

=== Complete 24 Hours of Zolder results ===
Year	Team	Co-Drivers	Car	Class	Laps	Pos.	Class Pos.
2014	(Belgium) Vandereyt Racing	(Belgium) François Bouillon (Belgium) Angélique Detavernier (Belgium) Louis-Philippe Soenen (Belgium) Miguel Vandereyt (Belgium) Patrick Van Glabeke	Porsche 997 GT3 Cup	GT-1	721	4th	3rd
2015	(Belgium) Vandereyt Racing	(Belgium) Angélique Detavernier (Belgium) Louis-Philippe Soenen (Belgium) Miguel Vandereyt (Belgium) Patrick Van Glabeke	Porsche 997 GT3 Cup	GT-1	680	24th	3rd
2016	(Belgium) Speedlover	(Belgium) Angélique Detavernier (Belgium) Frédérique Jonckheere (Belgium) Louis-Philippe Soenen (Belgium) Miguel Vandereyt	Porsche 997 GT3 Cup	Belcar 1	702	7th	4th
2017	(Belgium) McDonald's Racing	(Belgium) François Bouillon (Belgium) Kris Cools (Belgium) David Houthoofd	Norma M20-FC	Belcar 2	817	2nd	2nd
2018	(Belgium) Aqua Protect Racing Team	(Belgium) François Bouillon (Belgium) Kris Cools (Belgium) David Houthoofd (Belgium) Marc Goossens	Norma M20-FC	Belcar 2	796	3rd	1st
2019	(Belgium) McDonald's Racing	(Belgium) François Bouillon (Belgium) Kris Cools (Belgium) Koen De Wit	Norma M20-FC	Belcar 1	773	3rd	2nd

Sporting positions
Preceded by Carlo van Dam	German Formula Three Champion; 2008	Succeeded by Laurens Vanthoor
Preceded by Dillon Battistini	Asian Formula Three; Champion; 2007–2008	Succeeded by None
