= 2010 Superleague Formula season =

Open wheel motor racing competition

Seasons
- ← 2009 2011 →

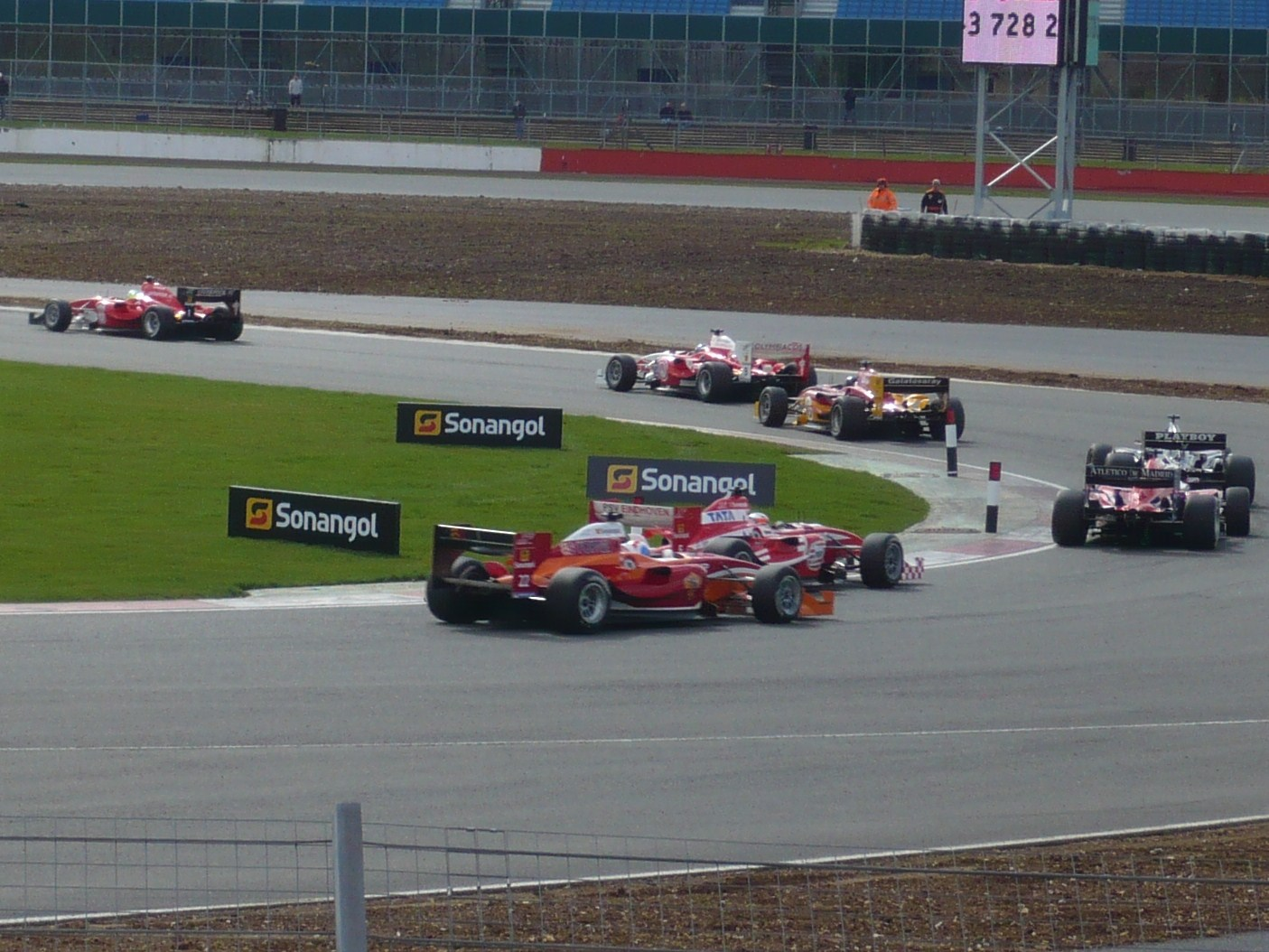
Race action at Brooklands corner, Silverstone at Superleague Formula Round 1

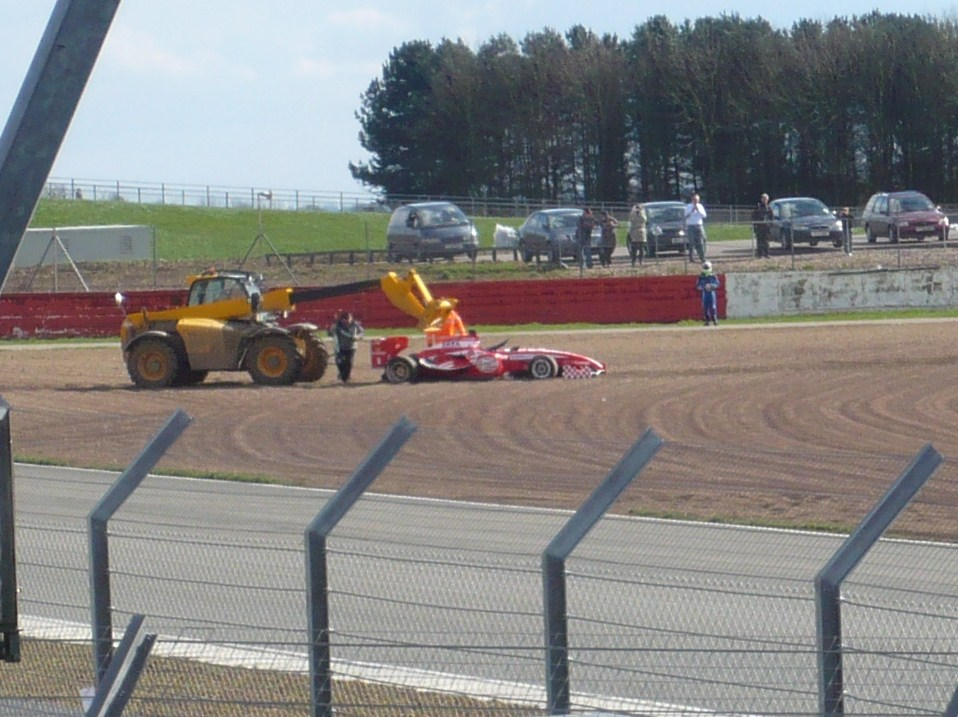
PSV Eindhoven (Narain Karthikeyan) car retrieved mid-race after spinning into the gravel at Superleague Formula Round 1

The 2010 Superleague Formula season was the third Superleague Formula championship. The series was rebranded "Superleague Formula by Sonangol", due to a two-year deal that began in the previous season. The first race of the season was on 4 April at Silverstone and it finished on 24 October at Navarra after a series record of 12 race weekends in all.

The series' prize fund was increased to €5 million, with the championship-winning team winning €1 million. Superleague Formula teamed up with The NewsMarket to distribute video content to 25,000 global media outlets in over 190 countries throughout the season. Ex-Formula One and WTCC driver Tiago Monteiro praised Superleague Formula by saying he was "pretty impressed with what they've done so far".

R.S.C. Anderlecht, run under Azerti Motorsport with driver Davide Rigon, won the championship, but only after the last Super Final of the last event of the season. It was R.S.C. Anderlecht's first series title but the second for Rigon, who won the title with Beijing Guoan in 2008.

== Teams and drivers ==
- All teams competed on Michelin tyres.

| Entrant | Race team | No. | Race driver(s) | Rounds |
|---|---|---|---|---|
| (England) Liverpool F.C. | (United Kingdom) Atech GP/Reid Motorsport | 1 | (United Kingdom) James Walker | 1–7 |
| (England) Liverpool F.C. | (United Kingdom) Atech GP/Reid Motorsport | 1 | (Belgium) Frédéric Vervisch | 8–11 * |
| (Portugal) Sporting CP | (United Kingdom) Atech GP/Reid Motorsport | 2 | (Spain) Borja García | 1–5 |
| (Portugal) Sporting CP | (United Kingdom) Atech GP/Reid Motorsport | 2 | (Spain) Andy Soucek | 6–7 |
| (Portugal) Sporting CP | (Spain) Drivex | 2 | (Spain) Máximo Cortés | 9 |
| (Portugal) Sporting CP | (Spain) EmiliodeVillota Motorsport | 2 | (Spain) Adrián Vallés | 10–11 * |
| (Italy) A.C. Milan | (United Kingdom) Atech GP/Reid Motorsport | 3 | (Netherlands) Yelmer Buurman | All * |
| (Turkey) Galatasaray S.K. | (France) Barazi-Epsilon | 4 | (France) Tristan Gommendy | 1–8 |
| (Turkey) Galatasaray S.K. | (Germany) GU-Racing International | 4 | (Spain) Andy Soucek | 9 |
| (Turkey) Galatasaray S.K. | (Germany) GU-Racing International | 4 | (Italy) Giacomo Ricci | 10 * |
| (Turkey) Galatasaray S.K. | (Spain) Drivex | 4 | (New Zealand) Chris van der Drift | 11 |
| (Netherlands) PSV Eindhoven | (Netherlands) Racing for Holland | 5 | (India) Narain Karthikeyan | 1–2, 4–5 |
| (Netherlands) PSV Eindhoven | (United Kingdom) Atech GP/Reid Motorsport | 5 | (India) Narain Karthikeyan | 6–7 |
| (Netherlands) PSV Eindhoven | (United Kingdom) Atech GP/Reid Motorsport | 5 | (United Kingdom) Hywel Lloyd | 8–9 |
| (Netherlands) PSV Eindhoven | (United Kingdom) Atech GP/Reid Motorsport | 5 | (China) Adderly Fong | 10 |
| (Netherlands) PSV Eindhoven | (United Kingdom) Atech GP/Reid Motorsport | 5 | (New Zealand) Earl Bamber | * |
| (Netherlands) PSV Eindhoven | (United Kingdom) Atech GP/Reid Motorsport | 5 | (Argentina) Esteban Guerrieri | 11 |
| (Brazil) CR Flamengo | (United Kingdom) Alpha Team | 7 | (United Kingdom) Duncan Tappy | 1, 6–9 |
| (Brazil) CR Flamengo | (United Kingdom) Alpha Team | 7 | (France) Franck Perera | 2–5 |
| (Brazil) CR Flamengo | (United Kingdom) Alpha Team | 7 | (Spain) Andy Soucek | 10–11 * |
| (Belgium) R.S.C. Anderlecht | (Belgium) Azerti Motorsport | 8 | (Italy) Davide Rigon | All * |
| (Greece) Olympiacos CFP | (Germany) GU-Racing International | 9 | (New Zealand) Chris van der Drift | 1–7 |
| (Greece) Olympiacos CFP | (Germany) GU-Racing International | 9 | (United Kingdom) Ben Hanley | 8, 10–11 * |
| (Greece) Olympiacos CFP | (Germany) GU-Racing International | 9 | (Switzerland) Neel Jani | 9 |
| (Switzerland) FC Basel 1893 | (Germany) GU-Racing International | 10 | (Germany) Max Wissel | All * |
| (Brazil) SC Corinthians | (Belgium) Azerti Motorsport | 14 | (Netherlands) Robert Doornbos | All * |
| (Spain) Atlético Madrid | (United Kingdom) Alpha Team | 15 | (Australia) John Martin | 1 |
| (Spain) Atlético Madrid | (United Kingdom) Alpha Team | 15 | (Spain) María de Villota | 2–9, 11 |
| (Spain) Atlético Madrid | (United Kingdom) Alpha Team | 15 | (Spain) Bruno Méndez | 10 |
| (Spain) Atlético Madrid | (United Kingdom) Alpha Team | 15 | (Netherlands) Paul Meijer | * |
| (Portugal) F.C. Porto | (United Kingdom) Atech GP/Reid Motorsport | 16 | (Portugal) Álvaro Parente | 1–9, 11 * |
| (Portugal) F.C. Porto | (United Kingdom) Atech GP/Reid Motorsport | 16 | (New Zealand) Earl Bamber | 10 |
| (Spain) Sevilla FC | (Spain) EmiliodeVillota Motorsport | 18 | (Spain) Marcos Martínez | All * |
| (England) Tottenham Hotspur | (United Kingdom) Alan Docking Racing | 19 | (United Kingdom) Craig Dolby | All * |
| (Italy) A.S. Roma | (Spain) EmiliodeVillota Motorsport | 22 | (France) Julien Jousse | 1–10 * |
| (Italy) A.S. Roma | (Spain) EmiliodeVillota Motorsport | 22 | (Spain) Máximo Cortés | 11 |
| (China) Beijing Guoan | (United Kingdom) Alan Docking Racing | 24 | (Australia) John Martin | 2–11 * |
| (France) GD Bordeaux | (France) Barazi-Epsilon | 33 | (France) Franck Montagny | 1–5, 7 |
| (France) GD Bordeaux | (France) Barazi-Epsilon | 33 | (Netherlands) Jaap van Lagen | 6 |
| (France) GD Bordeaux | (Spain) Drivex | 33 | (Spain) Celso Míguez | 9 |
| (France) GD Bordeaux | (Belgium) Azerti Motorsport | 33 | (France) Franck Perera | 10–11 * |
| (France) Olympique Lyonnais | (France) Laurent Rédon Motorsport | 69 | (France) Sébastien Bourdais | 1–5 |
| (France) Olympique Lyonnais | (France) Laurent Rédon Motorsport | 69 | (France) Franck Perera | 7 |
| (France) Olympique Lyonnais | (Spain) Drivex | 69 | (Spain) Celso Míguez | 8 |
| (France) Olympique Lyonnais | (United Kingdom) Atech GP/Reid Motorsport | 69 | (France) Tristan Gommendy | 9–11 * |
| Team China | (United Kingdom) Atech GP/Reid Motorsport | 88 | (China) Qinghua Ma | 10 |
| Team China | (United Kingdom) Atech GP/Reid Motorsport | 88 | (China) Adderly Fong | * |

* Drivers who participated in the non-championship round at the Beijing street circuit.

- Cars 7 and 15 were going to be run by Durango but they pulled out and were replaced by Alpha Team prior to round 1.
- Al Ain, FC Midtjylland and Rangers F.C. did not compete this year having been left off the provisional entry list.
- GD Bordeaux made their debut in 2010. Beijing Guoan did not enter until prior to round 2.
- An FC Groningen car, to be driven by ex-F1 racer Jos Verstappen, was due to participate at the TT Circuit Assen round but the plan was abandoned five weeks before the event.
- Frenchman Bruce Jouanny remained the series' official test driver.

=== Driver changes ===
Changed teams

- Sébastien Bourdais: Sevilla FC → Olympique Lyonnais
- Yelmer Buurman: R.S.C. Anderlecht → A.C. Milan
- Tristan Gommendy: F.C. Porto → Galatasaray S.K. & Olympique Lyonnais
- Esteban Guerrieri: Olympiacos CFP → PSV Eindhoven
- John Martin: Rangers F.C. → Beijing Guoan via Atlético Madrid
- Franck Perera: A.S. Roma → CR Flamengo, Olympique Lyonnais & GD Bordeaux
- Duncan Tappy: Galatasaray S.K. → CR Flamengo
- Adrián Vallés: Liverpool F.C. → Sporting CP

Entering/Re-Entering Superleague Formula

- Earl Bamber: Toyota Racing Series (Triple X Motorsport) → F.C. Porto & PSV Eindhoven
- Máximo Cortés: Le Mans Series (Q8 Oils Hache Team) → Sporting CP & A.S. Roma
- Robert Doornbos: IndyCar Series (HVM Racing) → SC Corinthians
- Chris van der Drift: Formula Renault 3.5 Series (Epsilon Euskadi) → Olympiacos CFP & Galatasaray S.K.
- Adderly Fong: British Formula 3 Championship (Sino Vision Racing) → PSV Eindhoven & Team China
- Borja García: Atlantic Championship (Condor Motorsports) → Sporting CP
- Ben Hanley: CIK-FIA European KZ1 Championship (Maranello) → Olympiacos CFP
- Neel Jani: Le Mans Series (Rebellion Racing) → Olympiacos CFP
- Narain Karthikeyan: Le Mans Series (Kolles) → PSV Eindhoven
- Jaap van Lagen: Porsche Supercup (Bleekemolen Harders Plaza) → GD Bordeaux
- Hywel Lloyd: British Formula 3 Championship (CF Racing) → PSV Eindhoven
- Qinghua Ma: British Formula 3 Championship (Team West-Tec) → Team China
- Marcos Martínez: Formula Renault 3.5 Series (Pons Racing) → Sevilla FC
- Paul Meijer: GT4 European Cup (Rhesus Racing) → Atlético Madrid
- Bruno Méndez: Formula Renault 3.5 Series (FHV Interwetten.com) → Atlético Madrid
- Celso Míguez: Auto GP (RP Motorsport) → Olympique Lyonnais & GD Bordeaux
- Franck Montagny: American Le Mans Series (Team Peugeot Total) → GD Bordeaux
- Álvaro Parente: GP2 Series (Ocean Racing Technology) → F.C. Porto
- Giacomo Ricci: GP2 Series (David Price Racing) → Galatasaray S.K.
- Davide Rigon: GP2 Series (Trident Racing) → R.S.C. Anderlecht
- Andy Soucek: FIA Formula Two Championship (MotorSport Vision) → Sporting CP, Galatasaray S.K. & CR Flamengo
- Frédéric Vervisch: Italian Formula Three Championship (RC Motorsport) → Liverpool F.C.
- James Walker: Formula Renault 3.5 Series (P1 Motorsport) → Liverpool F.C.

Leaving Superleague Formula

- Kasper Andersen: FC Midtjylland → Rolex Sports Car Series (Starworks Motorsport)
- Enrique Bernoldi: CR Flamengo → FIA GT1 World Championship (Vitaphone Racing Team)
- Carlo van Dam: PSV Eindhoven → Le Mans Series (Atlas FX-Team Full Speed)
- Jonathan Kennard: CR Flamengo → Le Mans Series (KSM)
- Nelson Panciatici: Olympique Lyonnais → Formula Renault 3.5 Series (Lotus Racing Junior Team)
- Giorgio Pantano: A.C. Milan → Auto GP (Super Nova Racing)
- Pedro Petiz: Sporting CP → sabbatical
- Antônio Pizzonia: SC Corinthians → Stock Car Brasil (Hot Car Competições)
- Ho-Pin Tung: Galatasaray S.K. → GP2 Series (DAMS)

==== Mid-season changes ====
- María de Villota replaced John Martin at Atlético Madrid prior to round 2 at the TT Circuit Assen. Martin joined 2008 champions Beijing Guoan, who came into the season partly due to calls from promoters in China who wanted to see their return. Franck Perera replaced Duncan Tappy at CR Flamengo.
- PSV Eindhoven, with driver Narain Karthikeyan, did not compete at round 3 due his involvement in the NASCAR Camping World Truck Series race on the same weekend.
- Olympique Lyonnais skipped the Zolder round after parting company with driver Sébastien Bourdais. Also for Zolder, Andy Soucek replaced Borja García in the Sporting CP car, and Jaap van Lagen replaced Franck Montagny at GD Bordeaux. Reid Motorsport took over the running of the PSV Eindhoven car from Racing for Holland.
- Round 7 at Brands Hatch saw the return of club Olympique Lyonnais with new driver Franck Perera and Laurent Rédon's team rebranded as Laurent Rédon Motorsport over the previous incarnation as LRS Formula. Franck Montagny also returned to the GD Bordeaux car. Alpha Team was renamed Alpha Motorsport and fully merged with ADR.
- Ben Hanley replaced the injured Chris van der Drift for Olympiacos at Adria. Olympique Lyonnais ran their third driver of the season, Celso Míguez, now managed by the Drivex team. Sporting CP and GD Bordeaux cited "technical problems" for not competing, leaving a record-low 16 clubs to race. Maxime Jousse almost had to stand-in for brother Julien at A.S. Roma following a biking accident. Frédéric Vervisch replaced James Walker at Liverpool F.C. and Hywel Lloyd replaced Narain Karthikeyan at PSV Eindhoven.
- At Portimão, Olympique Lyonnais ran their fourth driver of the season, Tristan Gommendy and have new management at the Atech/Reid partnership. Máximo Cortés raced for Sporting CP and Celso Míguez moved to GD Bordeaux as Drivex switched to manage these two cars. Andy Soucek returned with Galatasaray S.K. who switched to GU-Racing. Neel Jani stepped into the Olympiacos machine, as Ben Hanley was contesting the Karting World Championship. The field was back to featuring eighteen cars again.
- Former champion Adrián Vallés returned to the series at Ordos, with Sporting CP, now run by Emilio de Villota's squad. Andy Soucek moved to Flamengo and Franck Perera raced in the now Azerti Motorsport-run Bordeaux car. Giacomo Ricci, Bruno Méndez and Adderly Fong all made debuts; in Soucek's vacated Galatasaray seat, for Atlético Madrid and PSV Eindhoven respectively. Ben Hanley returned to Olympiacos after Neel Jani drove for them in Portimão. Also making an appearance at Ordos was a Team China car with Qinghua Ma at the wheel. Visa issues ruled out Álvaro Parente from Ordos, with Earl Bamber stepping into Parente's seat at F.C. Porto.
- Álvaro Parente returned to the F.C. Porto seat for Beijing, leaving Earl Bamber to move to PSV Eindhoven, replacing Adderly Fong. Fong did however compete in qualifying and the first race having replaced Qinghua Ma at Team China following the practice sessions. Paul Meijer returned to the series, replacing the injured Bruno Méndez at Atlético Madrid.
- For the season finale at Navarra, Esteban Guerrieri returned with PSV Eindhoven, becoming their fifth driver of the year. María de Villota rejoined Atlético Madrid and Máximo Cortés stepped into A.S. Roma's car. Chris van der Drift made an early return with Galatasaray S.K. (operated by the returning Drivex team) following his accident at Brands Hatch.

== 2010 schedule ==
- A provisional calendar for the season was leaked on 21 October 2009. Alex Andreu, Superleague Formula founder, stated after the 2009 season finale that "we are already looking forward to our third season next year and expanding our calendar to 12 rounds". In December, the FIA published a 2010 calendar, confirming 6 events, with a 12-race calendar released on 12 January 2010 and Adria, Istanbul and Spa all missing. Adria returned to the calendar at the series' media day at Assen on 22 March, replacing Monza. Other changes saw Oschersleben, Estoril and Jerez dropped in place of the new Circuito de Navarra and the Autódromo Internacional do Algarve in Portimão. In July 2010, the series' first non-European events were announced — two race meetings in China, with the first being at the newly built Ordos International Circuit and the second around Beijing's new street circuit. The Beijing meeting was a non-championship event, after the track failed to gain the required FIA Grade 2 status in order to host a championship event.
- The races had four different commentators on the SF World Feed: Ben Edwards spoke at six rounds, Martin Haven commentated at Silverstone and the Chinese races, Jonathan Green was at Jarama and John Hindhaugh did the Adria and Portimão rounds. Abi Griffiths became the new pitlane reporter, replacing Ben Constadanduros and Warren Pole. Co-commentators were Bruce Jouanny (rounds 1–6, 9, 11), Earl Bamber (rounds 7–8), María de Villota (round 8), Ho-Pin Tung (round 10) and Andy Soucek (Beijing round).

=== Race calendar and results ===
| Round | | Race | Date | Pole position | Fastest lap | Winning club | Winning team | Weekend winner | Report |
|---|---|---|---|---|---|---|---|---|---|
| 1 | R1 | (United Kingdom) Silverstone | 4 April | (Switzerland) FC Basel 1893 | (Portugal) F.C. Porto | (England) Tottenham Hotspur | (United Kingdom) Alan Docking Racing | (England) Tottenham Hotspur | Report |
| 1 | R2 | (United Kingdom) Silverstone | 4 April | | (France) Olympique Lyonnais | (France) Olympique Lyonnais | (France) LRS Formula | (England) Tottenham Hotspur | Report |
| 2 | R1 | (Netherlands) Assen | 16 May | (Belgium) R.S.C. Anderlecht | (Italy) A.C. Milan | (Belgium) R.S.C. Anderlecht | (Belgium) Azerti Motorsport | (Belgium) R.S.C. Anderlecht | Report |
| 2 | R2 | (Netherlands) Assen | 16 May | | (England) Tottenham Hotspur | (Greece) Olympiacos CFP | (Germany) GU-Racing International | (Belgium) R.S.C. Anderlecht | Report |
| 3 | R1 | (France) Magny-Cours | 23 May | (England) Tottenham Hotspur | (Italy) A.C. Milan | (Italy) A.C. Milan | (United Kingdom) Atech GP/Reid Motorsport | (Italy) A.C. Milan | Report |
| 3 | R2 | (France) Magny-Cours | 23 May | | (Switzerland) FC Basel 1893 | (Switzerland) FC Basel 1893 | (Germany) GU-Racing International | (Italy) A.C. Milan | Report |
| 4 | R1 | (Spain) Jarama | 20 June | (China) Beijing Guoan | (Italy) A.C. Milan | (China) Beijing Guoan | (United Kingdom) Alan Docking Racing | (Greece) Olympiacos CFP | Report |
| 4 | R2 | (Spain) Jarama | 20 June | | (Italy) A.S. Roma | (France) GD Bordeaux | (France) Barazi-Epsilon | (Greece) Olympiacos CFP | Report |
| 5 | R1 | (Germany) Nürburgring | 27 June | (Italy) A.S. Roma | (Switzerland) FC Basel 1893 | (Italy) A.C. Milan | (United Kingdom) Atech GP/Reid Motorsport | (Greece) Olympiacos CFP | Report |
| 5 | R2 | (Germany) Nürburgring | 27 June | | (France) GD Bordeaux | (Portugal) F.C. Porto | (United Kingdom) Atech GP/Reid Motorsport | (Greece) Olympiacos CFP | Report |
| 6 | R1 | (Belgium) Zolder | 18 July | (Greece) Olympiacos CFP | (Belgium) R.S.C. Anderlecht | (Greece) Olympiacos CFP | (Germany) GU-Racing International | (Belgium) R.S.C. Anderlecht | Report |
| 6 | R2 | (Belgium) Zolder | 18 July | | (Italy) A.C. Milan | (Italy) A.S. Roma | (Spain) EmiliodeVillota Motorsport | (Belgium) R.S.C. Anderlecht | Report |
| 7 | R1 | (United Kingdom) Brands Hatch | 1 August | (Spain) Sevilla FC | (England) Tottenham Hotspur | (China) Beijing Guoan | (United Kingdom) Alan Docking Racing | (China) Beijing Guoan | Report |
| 7 | R2 | (United Kingdom) Brands Hatch | 1 August | | (Brazil) CR Flamengo | (Netherlands) PSV Eindhoven | (United Kingdom) Atech GP/Reid Motorsport | (China) Beijing Guoan | Report |
| 8 | R1 | (Italy) Adria | 5 September | (Belgium) R.S.C. Anderlecht | (Switzerland) FC Basel 1893 | (Belgium) R.S.C. Anderlecht | (Belgium) Azerti Motorsport | (Belgium) R.S.C. Anderlecht | Report |
| 8 | R2 | (Italy) Adria | 5 September | | (Brazil) SC Corinthians | (Spain) Sevilla FC | (Spain) EmiliodeVillota Motorsport | (Belgium) R.S.C. Anderlecht | Report |
| 9 | R1 | (Portugal) Portimão | 19 September | (China) Beijing Guoan | (Turkey) Galatasaray S.K. | (China) Beijing Guoan | (United Kingdom) Alan Docking Racing | (England) Liverpool F.C. | Report |
| 9 | R2 | (Portugal) Portimão | 19 September | | (France) Olympique Lyonnais | (Greece) Olympiacos CFP | (Germany) GU-Racing International | (England) Liverpool F.C. | Report |
| 10 | R1 | (China) Ordos | 3 October | (Greece) Olympiacos CFP | (Greece) Olympiacos CFP | (Greece) Olympiacos CFP | (Germany) GU-Racing International | (Portugal) F.C. Porto | Report |
| 10 | R2 | (China) Ordos | 3 October | | (Greece) Olympiacos CFP | (England) Liverpool F.C. | (United Kingdom) Atech GP/Reid Motorsport | (Portugal) F.C. Porto | Report |
| NC | R1 | (China) Beijing SC | 10 October | (Portugal) F.C. Porto | (England) Liverpool F.C. | (England) Tottenham Hotspur | (United Kingdom) Alan Docking Racing | (Netherlands) PSV Eindhoven † (from best R1 & R2 results) | Report |
| NC | R2 | (China) Beijing SC | 10 October | | (England) Liverpool F.C. | (Portugal) F.C. Porto | (United Kingdom) Atech GP/Reid Motorsport | (Netherlands) PSV Eindhoven † (from best R1 & R2 results) | Report |
| 11 | R1 | (Spain) Navarra | 24 October | (Belgium) R.S.C. Anderlecht | (England) Liverpool F.C. | (China) Beijing Guoan | (United Kingdom) Alan Docking Racing | (China) Beijing Guoan | Report |
| 11 | R2 | (Spain) Navarra | 24 October | | (Portugal) F.C. Porto | (Portugal) F.C. Porto | (United Kingdom) Atech GP/Reid Motorsport | (China) Beijing Guoan | Report |

† Race 3 was cancelled due to poor track and weather conditions.

- Race 2 starts with reverse grid from finishing order of Race 1.
- All events included a Race 3 (to find the 'Weekend Winner') as in 2009.

=== Test calendar and results ===
- There was a test session prior to round 1 of the season, on 1 April at Silverstone Circuit. Julien Jousse was the fastest driver, for club A.S. Roma, during a rain-soaked test session.

== Championship standings ==
| Pos | Entrant | Drivers | SIL (United Kingdom) | | | ASS (Netherlands) | | | MAG (France) | | | JAR (Spain) | | | NÜR (Germany) | | | ZOL (Belgium) | | | BRH (United Kingdom) | | | ADR (Italy) | | | POR (Portugal) | | | ORD (China) | | | BEI † (China) | | | NAV (Spain) | | | Pts |
| Pos | Entrant | Drivers | R1 | R2 | S | R1 | R2 | S | R1 | R2 | S | R1 | R2 | S | R1 | R2 | S | R1 | R2 | S | R1 | R2 | S | R1 | R2 | S | R1 | R2 | S | R1 | R2 | S | R1 | R2 | S | R1 | R2 | S | Pts |
|---|---|---|---|---|---|---|---|---|---|---|---|---|---|---|---|---|---|---|---|---|---|---|---|---|---|---|---|---|---|---|---|---|---|---|---|---|---|---|---|
| 1 | (Belgium) AND | (Italy) Davide Rigon | 9 | 10 | X | 1 | 10 | 1 | 7 | 3 | 2 | 10 | 6 | X | 2 | 12 | 2 | 2 | 9 | 1 | 13 | 2 | 2 | 1 | 8 | 1 | 2 | 9 | 2 | 5 | 8 | 3 | 13 | 15 | C | 2 | 11 | 4 | 699 |
| 2 | (England) TOT | (England) Craig Dolby | 1 | 4 | 1 | 7 | 2 | 2 | 2 | 4 | 6 | 5 | 3 | 6 | 10 | 6 | X | 5 | 17 | X | 2 | 13 | 5 | 13 | 2 | X | 5 | 13 | X | 4 | 10 | X | 1 | 8 | C | 3 | 4 | 2 | 697 |
| 3 | (Switzerland) BAS | (Germany) Max Wissel | 5 | 6 | 2 | 3 | 13 | 5 | 17 | 1 | 3 | 4 | 7 | 4 | 8 | 5 | 4 | 7 | 4 | 6 | 6 | 11 | X | 4 | 7 | 2 | 7 | 4 | 4 | 2 | 2 | 6 | DN | DN | C | 6 | 14 | X | 667 |
| 4 | (Greece) OLY | (New Zealand) Chris van der Drift | 13 | 2 | 3 | 15 | 1 | X | 3 | 12 | X | 3 | 12 | 1 | 3 | 11 | 1 | 1 | 8 | 2 | 7 | 6 | DN^{‡} | | | | | | | | | | | | | | | | 653 |
| 4 | (Greece) OLY | (England) Ben Hanley | | | | | | | | | | | | | | | | | | | | | | 3 | 10 | 3 | | | | 1 | 4 | 5 | 9 | 14 | C | 12 | 8 | X | 653 |
| 4 | (Greece) OLY | (Switzerland) Neel Jani | | | | | | | | | | | | | | | | | | | | | | | | | 14 | 1 | X | | | | | | | | | | 653 |
| 5 | (Italy) ACM | (Netherlands) Yelmer Buurman | 2 | 16 | X | 5 | 7 | 3 | 1 | 7 | 1 | 2 | 10 | 3 | 1 | 8 | 3 | 4 | 5 | 5 | 4 | 12 | 4 | 11 | 4 | X | 10 | 16 | X | 6 | 7 | 4 | 7 | 3 | C | 7 | 12 | X | 631 |
| 6 | (Brazil) FLA | (England) Duncan Tappy | 3 | 12 | X | | | | | | | | | | | | | 17 | 2 | X | 9 | 3 | 3 | 10 | 3 | X | 8 | 7 | X | | | | | | | | | | 540 |
| 6 | (Brazil) FLA | (France) Franck Perera | | | | 2 | 11 | 6 | 8 | 13 | X | 6 | 8 | X | 4 | 9 | 6 | | | | | | | | | | | | | | | | | | | | | | 540 |
| 6 | (Brazil) FLA | (Spain) Andy Soucek | | | | | | | | | | | | | | | | | | | | | | | | | | | | 17 | 3 | X | DN | DN | C | 4 | 18 | X | 540 |
| 7 | (Portugal) FCP | (Portugal) Álvaro Parente | 4 | 5 | 5 | 11 | 16 | X | 5 | 11 | X | 8 | 11 | X | 17 | 1 | X | 11 | 12 | X | 11 | 4 | 6 | 6 | 11 | X | 3 | 17 | X | | | | 15 | 1 | C | 8 | 1 | 6 | 495 |
| 7 | (Portugal) FCP | (New Zealand) Earl Bamber | | | | | | | | | | | | | | | | | | | | | | | | | | | | 3 | 12 | 1 | | | | | | | 495 |
| 8 | (Italy) ASR | (France) Julien Jousse | 8 | 13 | X | 4 | 12 | X | 13 | 2 | 4 | 14 | 2 | 5 | 5 | 14 | X | 15 | 1 | 3 | 17 | 5 | X | 5 | 14 | X | 13 | 10 | X | 11 | 16 | X | 8 | 13 | C | | | | 458 |
| 8 | (Italy) ASR | (Spain) Máximo Cortés | | | | | | | | | | | | | | | | | | | | | | | | | | | | | | | | | | 18 | 5 | X | 458 |
| 9 | (China) BEI | (Australia) John Martin | | | | 10 | 17 | X | 4 | 10 | X | 1 | 9 | 2 | 18 | 15 | X | 13 | 7 | X | 1 | 16 | 1 | 2 | 9 | 4 | 1 | 11 | 3 | 19 | DN | X | 11 | 6 | C | 1 | 6 | 1 | 453 |
| 10 | (England) LFC | (England) James Walker | 16 | 17 | X | 6 | 6 | 4 | 6 | 8 | 5 | 16 | 4 | X | 6 | 18 | X | 6 | 13 | X | 10 | 10 | X | | | | | | | | | | | | | | | | 439 |
| 10 | (England) LFC | (Belgium) Frédéric Vervisch | | | | | | | | | | | | | | | | | | | | | | 7 | 5 | 6 | 4 | 6 | 1 | 15 | 1 | X | 3 | 7 | C | 16 | 16 | X | 439 |
| 11 | (France) GDB | (France) Franck Montagny | DN | 8 | X | 14 | 3 | X | 10 | 14 | X | 17 | 1 | X | 15 | 2 | X | | | | 5 | 14 | X | | | | | | | | | | | | | | | | 372 |
| 11 | (France) GDB | (Netherlands) Jaap van Lagen | | | | | | | | | | | | | | | | 12 | 10 | X | | | | | | | | | | | | | | | | | | | 372 |
| 11 | (France) GDB | (Spain) Celso Míguez | | | | | | | | | | | | | | | | | | | | | | | | | 18 | 14 | X | | | | | | | | | | 372 |
| 11 | (France) GDB | (France) Franck Perera | | | | | | | | | | | | | | | | | | | | | | | | | | | | 7 | 6 | 2 | 2 | 10 | C | 5 | 9 | 5 | 372 |
| 12 | (Brazil) COR | (Netherlands) Robert Doornbos | 11 | 7 | X | 9 | 15 | X | 12 | 16 | X | 9 | 5 | X | 7 | 10 | X | 3 | 16 | X | 15 | 18 | X | 8 | 6 | X | 6 | 3 | 5 | 18 | 15 | X | DN | DN | C | 9 | 15 | X | 363 |
| 13 | (Turkey) GAL | (France) Tristan Gommendy | 14 | 14 | X | 8 | 8 | X | 14 | 9 | X | 13 | 14 | X | 9 | 3 | 5 | 14 | 3 | 4 | 8 | 17 | X | 9 | 13 | X | | | | | | | | | | | | | 358 |
| 13 | (Turkey) GAL | (Spain) Andy Soucek | | | | | | | | | | | | | | | | | | | | | | | | | 9 | 5 | X | | | | | | | | | | 358 |
| 13 | (Turkey) GAL | (Italy) Giacomo Ricci | | | | | | | | | | | | | | | | | | | | | | | | | | | | 13 | DN | X | 12 | 12 | C | | | | 358 |
| 13 | (Turkey) GAL | (New Zealand) Chris van der Drift | | | | | | | | | | | | | | | | | | | | | | | | | | | | | | | | | | 17 | 7 | X | 358 |
| 14 | (Spain) SEV | (Spain) Marcos Martínez | 6 | 9 | X | 12 | 4 | X | 16 | 17 | X | 15 | 16 | X | 11 | 13 | X | 8 | 15 | X | 16 | 8 | X | 14 | 1 | 5 | 12 | 18 | X | 8 | 9 | X | 16 | 4 | C | 15 | 3 | X | 355 |
| 15 | (Portugal) SCP | (Spain) Borja García | 7 | 11 | X | 18 | 5 | X | 11 | 5 | X | 18 | 13 | X | 12 | 7 | X | | | | | | | | | | | | | | | | | | | | | | 329 |
| 15 | (Portugal) SCP | (Spain) Andy Soucek | | | | | | | | | | | | | | | | 9 | 6 | X | 3 | 15 | X | | | | | | | | | | | | | | | | 329 |
| 15 | (Portugal) SCP | (Spain) Máximo Cortés | | | | | | | | | | | | | | | | | | | | | | | | | 15 | 15 | X | | | | | | | | | | 329 |
| 15 | (Portugal) SCP | (Spain) Adrián Vallés | | | | | | | | | | | | | | | | | | | | | | | | | | | | 16 | 5 | X | 5 | 9 | C | 10 | 17 | X | 329 |
| 16 | (Netherlands) PSV | (India) Narain Karthikeyan | 12 | 15 | X | 13 | 9 | X | | | | 11 | 15 | X | 13 | 16 | X | 10 | 14 | X | 18 | 1 | X | | | | | | | | | | | | | | | | 288 |
| 16 | (Netherlands) PSV | (Wales) Hywel Lloyd | | | | | | | | | | | | | | | | | | | | | | 12 | 12 | X | 16 | 8 | X | | | | | | | | | | 288 |
| 16 | (Netherlands) PSV | (China) Adderly Fong | | | | | | | | | | | | | | | | | | | | | | | | | | | | 10 | 11 | X | | | | | | | 288 |
| 16 | (Netherlands) PSV | (New Zealand) Earl Bamber | | | | | | | | | | | | | | | | | | | | | | | | | | | | | | | 6 | 2 | C | | | | 288 |
| 16 | (Netherlands) PSV | (Argentina) Esteban Guerrieri | | | | | | | | | | | | | | | | | | | | | | | | | | | | | | | | | | 11 | 2 | 3 | 288 |
| 17 | (Spain) ATM | (Australia) John Martin | 10 | 3 | 6 | | | | | | | | | | | | | | | | | | | | | | | | | | | | | | | | | | 265 |
| 17 | (Spain) ATM | (Spain) María de Villota | | | | 16 | 14 | X | 15 | 6 | X | EX* | DQ* | X | 16 | 4 | X | 16 | 11 | X | 14 | 7 | X | DN | DN | X | 17 | 12 | X | | | | | | | 13 | 10 | X | 265 |
| 17 | (Spain) ATM | (Spain) Bruno Méndez | | | | | | | | | | | | | | | | | | | | | | | | | | | | 9 | 14 | X | | | | | | | 265 |
| 17 | (Spain) ATM | (Netherlands) Paul Meijer | | | | | | | | | | | | | | | | | | | | | | | | | | | | | | | 14 | 5 | C | | | | 265 |
| 18 | (France) LYO | (France) Sébastien Bourdais | 15 | 1 | 4 | 17 | DN | X | 9 | 15 | X | 7 | 18 | X | 14 | 17 | X | | | | | | | | | | | | | | | | | | | | | | 235 |
| 18 | (France) LYO | (France) Franck Perera | | | | | | | | | | | | | | | | | | | 12 | 9 | X | | | | | | | | | | | | | | | | 235 |
| 18 | (France) LYO | (Spain) Celso Míguez | | | | | | | | | | | | | | | | | | | | | | 15 | 15 | X | | | | | | | | | | | | | 235 |
| 18 | (France) LYO | (France) Tristan Gommendy | | | | | | | | | | | | | | | | | | | | | | | | | 11 | 2 | 6 | 14 | 17 | X | 4 | 11 | C | 14 | 13 | X | 235 |
| 19 | (China) CHN | (China) Qinghua Ma | | | | | | | | | | | | | | | | | | | | | | | | | | | | 12 | 13 | X | | | | | | | 26 |
| 19 | (China) CHN | (China) Adderly Fong | | | | | | | | | | | | | | | | | | | | | | | | | | | | | | | 10 | DN | C | | | | 26 |
| Pos | Entrant | Drivers | R1 | R2 | S | R1 | R2 | S | R1 | R2 | S | R1 | R2 | S | R1 | R2 | S | R1 | R2 | S | R1 | R2 | S | R1 | R2 | S | R1 | R2 | S | R1 | R2 | S | R1 | R2 | S | R1 | R2 | S | Pts |
| Pos | Entrant | Drivers | SIL (United Kingdom) | | | ASS (Netherlands) | | | MAG (France) | | | JAR (Spain) | | | NÜR (Germany) | | | ZOL (Belgium) | | | BRH (United Kingdom) | | | ADR (Italy) | | | POR (Portugal) | | | ORD (China) | | | BEI † (China) | | | NAV (Spain) | | | Pts |

<duv style="font-size: 85%"> NOTE – R2 starts
with reverse grid
S = Super Final

† Round at Beijing was a non-championship event with no points given out for any of the races.

* María de Villota finished 12th in race one and retired in 17th from race two at Jarama. She was subsequently disqualified from race two, after the race had finished, for crashing into Sébastien Bourdais early on after spinning off the track herself. She was also excluded from the race one result and lost the 14 points she would have earned for that finish.

^{‡} Chris van der Drift qualified for the Super Final at Brands Hatch but was unable to compete due to suffering injuries from a large crash in race two which led to him being taken to hospital with a broken ankle, two broken ribs, a cracked shoulder blade, a dislocated shoulder and two broken fingers. His Super Final place was taken up by the seventh highest points-scorer of the weekend, Yelmer Buurman.

Race 1 and 2 points

| Position | 1st | 2nd | 3rd | 4th | 5th | 6th | 7th | 8th | 9th | 10th | 11th | 12th | 13th | 14th | 15th | 16th | 17th | 18th | 19th | 20th | 21st | 22nd | DNF | DNS | Ref |
| Points | 50 | 45 | 40 | 36 | 32 | 29 | 26 | 23 | 20 | 18 | 16 | 14 | 12 | 10 | 8 | 7 | 6 | 5 | 4 | 3 | 2 | 1 | 0 | 0 | |

Super Final points

| Position | 1st | 2nd | 3rd | 4th | 5th | 6th | DNQ | DNS | Ref |
| Points | 6 | 5 | 4 | 3 | 2 | 1 | 0 | 0 | |

- New for 2010 was the rule that a driver had to finish a race in order to earn points, instead of just having to start. Another change this season saw, unlike in 2009, the Super Final count for points. The winner gained 6 points, runner-up 5 points, down to 6th place who gained 1 point, they had to qualify for the race by being one of the top six overall weekend's point scorers but unlike in the two main races they did not have to finish the five laps in order to collect points.
