= Reid Motorsport =

(United Kingdom) Reid Motorsport
- Founded: 2009
- Folded: 2010
- Team principal(s): Anthony Reid
- Former series: Superleague Formula

Reid Motorsport is a former British racing team operated by Anthony Reid, the former team truckie of Ultimate Motorsport. The team was founded in 2009 and it only ever competed in the now defunct Superleague Formula race series. It was created when Ultimate Motorsport left the Superleague Formula series. Reid rebranded the team ready for the 2009 Monza Superleague Formula round. They won a race with Sébastien Bourdais behind the wheel of the Sevilla FC entry. They also operate the Galatasaray S.K. entry and took victory in 2009 again there with Ho-Pin Tung.
