= 2016 BOSS GP Series =

Seasons
- ← 2015 2017 →

The 2016 BOSS GP season was the 22nd season of the BOSS GP series. The championship began on 17 April at Hockenheim and finished on 10 October at Imola.

== Teams and Drivers ==
Team	Chassis	Engine	No.	Driver	Rounds
Open Class
Ascari Racing	Jaguar R5	Cosworth CR-6 3.0 L V10	1	(Netherlands) Klaas Zwart	1–4
Top Speed	Toro Rosso STR1	Cosworth TJ2005 3.0 L V10	2	(Austria) Ingo Gerstl	1–5
Top Speed	Super Aguri SA06	Cosworth TJ2005 3.0 L V10	26	(Germany) Wolfgang Jaksch	1–2
GP Racing	Panoz DP01	Judd GV 4.2 L V10	3	(Austria) Peter Milavec	All
H&A Racing	Benetton B197	Judd GV 4.0 L V10	5	(Germany) Wolfgang Jordan	1–3, 5
H&A Racing	Benetton B197	Judd GV 4.0 L V10	21	(Austria) Bernd Herndlhofer	1–3
H&A Racing	Benetton B197	Judd GV 4.0 L V10	25	(Germany) Lance David Arnold	3
H&A Racing	Benetton B197	Judd GV 4.0 L V10	26	(Germany) Wolfgang Jaksch	3–4
VES Racing	Minardi PS04B	Cosworth CR-3L 3.0 L V10	10	(Netherlands) Frits van Eerd	1, 3–4, 6
VES Racing	Benetton B199	Judd GV 4.0 L V10	10	(Netherlands) Frits van Eerd	5
VES Racing	Benetton B197	Judd GV 4.2 L V10	20	(Brazil) Tarso Marques	6
Speed Center - Castrol	Forti FG03	Judd GV 4.0 L V10	22	(Germany) Hans Laub	2–5
Formula Class
Top Speed	Dallara GP2/08	Mecachrome V8108 4.0 L V8	100	(Austria) Christopher Höher	3, 5–6
Top Speed	Dallara GP2/08	Mecachrome V8108 4.0 L V8	888	(Germany) Florian Schnitzenbaumer	3–5
Top Speed	Dallara GP2/08	Mecachrome V8108 4.0 L V8	222	(Czech Republic) Veronika Cicha	1
Speed Center - Castrol	Dallara GP2/08	Mecachrome V8108 4.0 L V8	101	(Switzerland) Peter Göllner	1–5
Speed Center - Castrol	Dallara GP2/08	Mecachrome V8108 4.0 L V8	555	(Switzerland) Christian Eicke	All
Speed Center - Castrol	Dallara T08	Renault VQ35DE 3.5 L V6	666	(Switzerland) Roy Glaser	1, 3–4, 6
Racing Experience	Dallara GP2/08	Mecachrome V8108 4.0 L V8	102	(United Kingdom) Stuart Wiltshire	3–4
Racing Experience	Dallara GP2/08	Mecachrome V8108 4.0 L V8	103	(United States) Phil Stratford	3, 6
Racing Experience	Dallara GP2/08	Mecachrome V8108 4.0 L V8	320	(Luxembourg) Gary Hauser	1, 4
Hoffmann Racing	Dallara GP2/05	Mecachrome V8108 4.0 L V8	110	(Germany) Walter Steding	1–4, 6
PS Racing	Lola B05/52	Gibson ZG348 3.4 L V8	115	(India) Mahaveer Raghunathan	3–6
PS Racing	Lola B05/52	Gibson ZG348 3.4 L V8	116	(Italy) Emanuele Romani	6
Easy Formula	Panoz DP09B	Menard MCT V12 4.0 L V12	117	(France) Christopher Brenier	All
Easy Formula	Panoz DP09B	Menard MCT V12 4.0 L V12	118	(France) Gilles Brenier	All
Jenzer Motorsport	Dallara T08	Renault VQ35DE 3.5 L V6	121	(Switzerland) "Luke Skywalker"	1
Jenzer Motorsport	Dallara T08	Renault VQ35DE 3.5 L V6	919	(Switzerland) Thierry Christen	1
Jenzer Motorsport	Dallara SN01	AER P57 3.4 L V6	430	(Switzerland) Martin Kindler	1, 3, 6
Inter Europol Competition	Dallara GP2/05	Mecachrome V8108 4.0 L V8	122	(Denmark) Jens Renstrup	1–5
Inter Europol Competition	Dallara GP2/11	Mecachrome V8108 4.0 L V8	333	(Belgium) "Tintin"	6
Griffith's	Dallara GP2/08	Mecachrome V8108 4.0 L V8	126	(France) Bruno Navarette	3
Griffith's	Dallara GP2/05	Mecachrome V8108 4.0 L V8	150	(France) David Moretti	3
De Boer Manx	Dallara GP2/08	Mecachrome V8108 4.0 L V8	136	(Netherlands) Henk de Boer	2–6
Torino Squadra Corse	Lola B05/52	Gibson ZG348 3.4 L V8	155	(Mexico) Luis Michael Dörrbecker	3–6
H&A Racing	Dallara GP2/05	Mecachrome V8108 4.0 L V8	222	(Czech Republic) Veronika Cicha	3–5
H&A Racing	Dallara GP2/05	Mecachrome V8108 4.0 L V8	242	(Germany) Wolfgang Jaksch	5
MM International Motorsport	Lola B02/50	Zytek KV 3.0 L V8	323	(Italy) Armando Mangini	All
MM International Motorsport	Dallara GP2/05	Mecachrome V8108 4.0 L V8	999	(Italy) Salvatore de Plano	All
Becker Motorsport	Dallara SN01	AER P57 3.4 L V6	411	(Germany) Karl-Heinz Becker	All
Zele Racing	Lola B05/52	Gibson ZG348 3.4 L V8	444	(Austria) Philipp Sager	6
Zele Racing	Lola B05/52	Gibson ZG348 3.4 L V8	789	(Switzerland) Christof Von Grünigen	3–5
Reims Developpement Automobile	Dallara GP2/11	Mecachrome V8108 4.0 L V8	777	(France) Philippe Haezebrouck	1–2, 4

== Calendar ==
Round		Circuit	Date	Pole position	Fastest lap	Winning driver	Winning team	Formula Class Winner
1	R1	(Germany) Hockenheimring, Hockenheim	16 April	(Luxembourg) Gary Hauser	(Netherlands) Klaas Zwart	(Netherlands) Klaas Zwart	(United Kingdom) Ascari Racing	(Luxembourg) Gary Hauser
1	R2	(Germany) Hockenheimring, Hockenheim	17 April		(Netherlands) Klaas Zwart	(Austria) Ingo Gerstl	(Austria) Top Speed	(Luxembourg) Gary Hauser
2	R3	(Austria) Red Bull Ring, Steven Spielberg	14 May	(Austria) Ingo Gerstl	(Austria) Ingo Gerstl	(Austria) Ingo Gerstl	(Austria) Top Speed	(France) Christopher Brenier
2	R4	(Austria) Red Bull Ring, Steven Spielberg	15 May		(Austria) Ingo Gerstl	(Austria) Ingo Gerstl	(Austria) Top Speed	(France) Christopher Brenier
3	R5	(Italy) Autodromo Nazionale Monza, Monza	2 July	(Netherlands) Klaas Zwart	(Germany) Karl-Heinz Becker	(Austria) Ingo Gerstl	(Austria) Top Speed	(Austria) Christopher Höher
3	R6	(Italy) Autodromo Nazionale Monza, Monza	3 July		(France) Christopher Brenier	(Netherlands) Frits van Eerd	(Netherlands) VES Racing	(France) Christopher Brenier
4	R7	(Netherlands) TT Circuit Assen, Assen	6 August	(Austria) Ingo Gerstl	(Austria) Ingo Gerstl	(Austria) Ingo Gerstl	(Austria) Top Speed	(Luxembourg) Gary Hauser
4	R8	(Netherlands) TT Circuit Assen, Assen	7 August		(Austria) Ingo Gerstl	(Austria) Ingo Gerstl	(Austria) Top Speed	(Luxembourg) Gary Hauser
5	R9	(Czech Republic) Masaryk Circuit, Brno	10 September	(Austria) Ingo Gerstl	(Austria) Ingo Gerstl	(Austria) Ingo Gerstl	(Austria) Top Speed	(Austria) Christopher Höher
5	R10	(Czech Republic) Masaryk Circuit, Brno	11 September		(Austria) Ingo Gerstl	(Austria) Ingo Gerstl	(Austria) Top Speed	(Mexico) Luis Michael Dörrbecker
6	R11	(Italy) Autodromo Enzo e Dino Ferrari, Imola	8 October	(Brazil) Tarso Marques	(Austria) Christopher Höher	(Brazil) Tarso Marques	(Netherlands) VES Racing	(Mexico) Luis Michael Dörrbecker
6	R12	(Italy) Autodromo Enzo e Dino Ferrari, Imola	9 October		(Austria) Christopher Höher	(Mexico) Luis Michael Dörrbecker	(Italy) Torino Squadra Corse	(Mexico) Luis Michael Dörrbecker

== Championship standings ==
- Points for both championships were awarded as follows:

Race
Position	1st	2nd	3rd	4th	5th	6th	7th	8th	9th	10th	11th	12th	13th	14th	15th	16th	17th
All Races	25	22	20	18	16	14	12	10	9	8	7	6	5	4	3	2	1

=== Drivers Standings ===
Pos	Driver	HOC (Germany)		RBR (Austria)		MNZ (Italy)		ASS (Netherlands)		BRN (Czech Republic)		IMO (Italy)		Points
Open Class
1	(Austria) Ingo Gerstl	2	1	1	1	1	Ret	1	1	1	1			222
2	(Austria) Peter Milavec	9	16	5	5	5	Ret	8	10	4	2	11	13	212
3	(Netherlands) Frits van Eerd	7	5			2	1	4	DNS	7	Ret	12	2	168
4	(Netherlands) Klaas Zwart	1	2	Ret	2	22	Ret	2	15†					121
5	(Germany) Hans Laub			4	Ret	Ret	Ret	12	11	9	13†			90
6	(Germany) Wolfgang Jaksch	19	DNS	DNS	15	10		9	12					80
7	(Germany) Wolfgang Jordan	DNS	11	3	Ret	6	Ret			Ret	7			76
8	(Austria) Bernd Herndlhofer	4	3	DNS	3		Ret							60
9	(Brazil) Tarso Marques											1	3	47
	(Germany) Lance David Arnold					DNS	DNS							
Formula Class
1	(France) Christopher Brenier	5	6	2	4	4	2	5	3	Ret	5	5	Ret	223
2	(Mexico) Luis Michael Dörrbecker					8	5	6	4	6	3	2	1	169
3	(Italy) Salvatore De Plano	6	8	Ret	Ret	9	3	Ret	6	5	14	6	7	152
4	(France) Gilles Brenier	10	9	Ret	9	12	9	18	17	11	8	10	Ret	119
5	(India) Mahaveer Raghunathan					15	6	7	5	8	4	4	Ret	118
6	(France) Philippe Haezebrouck	8	7	6	6			10	9					108
7	(Luxembourg) Gary Hauser	3	4					3	2					100
8	(Denmark) Jens Renstrup	11	DNS	11	13	14	10	17	16	10	6			99
9	(Germany) Karl-Heinz Becker	16	Ret	10	11	21	12	15	19†	16	9	15	11	90
10	(Netherlands) Henk de Boer			8	8	Ret	DNS	DNS	DNS	13	10	13	8	79
11	(Switzerland) Christof Von Grünigen					7	4	Ret	8	3	Ret			74
12	(Germany) Walter Steding	15	18	9	10	18	17	DNS	Ret			9	9	73
13	(Switzerland) Peter Göllner	Ret	14	7	7	19	Ret	14	DNS	12	Ret			73
14	(Austria) Christopher Höher					3	Ret			2	DSQ	3	Ret	72
15	(Switzerland) Roy Glaser	14	10			16	16	13	14			16	14	65
16	(Italy) Armando Mangini	18	DNS	12	14	23	14	16	Ret	15	Ret	17	15	54
17	(Switzerland) Christian Eicke	Ret	17	Ret	12	13	Ret	DNS	18	Ret	11	18	12	53
18	(Czech Republic) Veronika Cicha	12	12			Ret	Ret	DNS	Ret	14	12			41
19	(Switzerland) Martin Kindler	Ret	13			17	13					14	10	39
20	(United Kingdom) Stuart Wiltshire					11	Ret	11	13					37
21	(United States) Phil Stratford					Ret	8					19	4	36
22	(Austria) Philipp Sager											7	5	34
23	(Germany) Florian Schnitzenbaumer					20	7	DNS	7	Ret	Ret			31
24	(Italy) Emanuele Romani											8	6	30
25	(Switzerland) Thierry Christen	13	15											18
26	(Germany) Wolfgang Jaksch									17	15			12
27	(France) David Moretti					Ret	11							8
28	(Switzerland) "Luke Skywalker"	17	Ret											6
29	(France) Bruno Navarette					Ret	15							4
	(Belgium) "Tintin"											Ret	Ret	
