= 2016 Auto GP Formula Open Championship =

2016 Auto GP

Seasons
- ← 2015 2017 →

The 2016 Auto GP Formula Open was the seventh and final year of the Auto GP, and the seventeenth season of the former Euroseries 3000. The championship was due to on 9 April at Misano and should have finished on 16 October in Mugello after six double-header rounds. For the first round, the championship was open to all the single-seaters from 2 to 4 liters, such as Formula One, GP2, World Series, International Formula 3000, Formula Masters and Formula 3 cars. After the first round, Auto GP merged with the BOSS GP Series due to a number of teams and drivers moving over.

== Teams and drivers ==
| Team | Car | Chassis | Engine | No. | Driver | Rounds |
|---|---|---|---|---|---|---|
| (Austria) Zele Racing | Auto GP | Lola B05/52 | Zytek | 7 | (Angola) Luís Sá Silva | 1 |
| (Austria) Zele Racing | Auto GP | Lola B05/52 | Zytek | 8 | (Hungary) Dominik Fekete | 1 |
| (Austria) Zele Racing | Auto GP | Lola B05/52 | Zytek | 9 | (Hungary) Zoltán Fekete | 1 |
| (Austria) Zele Racing | Auto GP | Lola B05/52 | Zytek | 444 | (Austria) Philipp Sager | 5 |
| (Austria) Zele Racing | Auto GP | Lola B05/52 | Zytek | 789 | (Switzerland) Christof von Grünigen | 2–4 |
| (Italy) PS Racing | Auto GP | Lola B05/52 | Zytek | 16 | (Italy) Salvatore de Plano | 1 |
| (Italy) PS Racing | Auto GP | Lola B05/52 | Zytek | 115 | (India) Mahaveer Raghunathan | All |
| (Italy) PS Racing | Auto GP | Lola B05/52 | Zytek | 116 | (Italy) Emanuele Romani | 5 |
| (Italy) MM International MotorSport | F3000 | Lola B02/50 | Zytek | 33 | (Italy) Armando Mangini | 1 |
| (Italy) Torino Squadra Corse | Auto GP | Lola B05/52 | Zytek | 155 | (Mexico) Luis Michael Dörrbecker | All |

== Calendar ==
The provisional calendar for the 2016 season was released on 24 November 2015. Originally all races were scheduled to be held in Italy, but a round at the Nürburgring was later added, only to be cancelled days ahead of being held due to an excess of noise, according to Mexican driver Luis Michael Dörrbecker. Auto GP did not release any news on the issue. Following that, the series was integrated into the BOSS GP Series, where it has its own category as well as being part of the BOSS GP Formula class.

| Round | | Circuit | Date | Pole position | Fastest lap | Winning driver | Winning team |
|---|---|---|---|---|---|---|---|
| 1 | R1 | (Italy) Adria International Raceway, Adria | 7 May | (Mexico) Luis Michael Dörrbecker | (Angola) Luís Sá Silva | (Mexico) Luis Michael Dörrbecker | (Italy) Torino Squadra Corse |
| 1 | R2 | (Italy) Adria International Raceway, Adria | 8 May | | (Mexico) Luis Michael Dörrbecker | (Mexico) Luis Michael Dörrbecker | (Italy) Torino Squadra Corse |
| 2 | R3 | (Italy) Autodromo Nazionale Monza, Monza | 2 July | Defined by the 2016 BOSS GP season | | | |
| 2 | R4 | (Italy) Autodromo Nazionale Monza, Monza | 3 July | Defined by the 2016 BOSS GP season | | | |
| 3 | R5 | (Netherlands) TT Circuit Assen, Assen | 6 August | Defined by the 2016 BOSS GP season | | | |
| 3 | R6 | (Netherlands) TT Circuit Assen, Assen | 7 August | Defined by the 2016 BOSS GP season | | | |
| 4 | R7 | (Czech Republic) Masaryk Circuit, Brno | 10 September | Defined by the 2016 BOSS GP season | | | |
| 4 | R8 | (Czech Republic) Masaryk Circuit, Brno | 11 September | Defined by the 2016 BOSS GP season | | | |
| 5 | R9 | (Italy) Autodromo Enzo e Dino Ferrari, Imola | 8 October | Defined by the 2016 BOSS GP season | | | |
| 5 | R10 | (Italy) Autodromo Enzo e Dino Ferrari, Imola | 9 October | Defined by the 2016 BOSS GP season | | | |

== Championship standings ==
- Points were awarded as follows:

Round 1
| R | 1 | 2 | 3 | 4 | 5 | 6 | 7 | 8 | 9 | 10 | PP | FL |
|---|---|---|---|---|---|---|---|---|---|---|---|---|
| Race 1 | 25 | 18 | 15 | 12 | 10 | 8 | 6 | 4 | 2 | 1 | 2 | 1 |
| Race 2 | 20 | 15 | 12 | 10 | 8 | 6 | 4 | 3 | 2 | 1 | 0 | 1 |

Rounds 2-5
| Position | 1st | 2nd | 3rd | 4th | 5th | 6th | 7th | 8th | 9th | 10th | 11th | 12th | 13th | 14th | 15th | 16th | 17th |
|---|---|---|---|---|---|---|---|---|---|---|---|---|---|---|---|---|---|
| Points | 25 | 22 | 20 | 18 | 16 | 14 | 12 | 10 | 9 | 8 | 7 | 6 | 5 | 4 | 3 | 2 | 1 |

=== Drivers' championship ===
| Pos | Driver | ADR (Italy) | | MNZ (Italy) | | ASS (Netherlands) | | BRN (Czech Republic) | | IMO (Italy) | | Points |
|---|---|---|---|---|---|---|---|---|---|---|---|---|
| 1 | (Mexico) Luis Michael Dörrbecker | 1 | 1 | 8 | 5 | 6 | 4 | 6 | 3 | 2 | 1 | 222 |
| 2 | (India) Mahaveer Raghunathan | 2 | 3 | 15 | 6 | 7 | 5 | 8 | 4 | 4 | Ret | 151 |
| 3 | (Switzerland) Christof von Grünigen | | | 7 | 4 | Ret | 8 | 3 | Ret | | | 74 |
| 4 | (Austria) Philipp Sager | | | | | | | | | 7 | 5 | 34 |
| 5 | (Italy) Emanuele Romani | | | | | | | | | 8 | 6 | 30 |
| 6 | (Angola) Luís Sá Silva | 5† | 2 | | | | | | | | | 29 |
| 7 | (Hungary) Dominik Fekete | 3 | 5 | | | | | | | | | 25 |
| 8 | (Italy) Armando Mangini | 4 | 6 | | | | | | | | | 20 |
| 9 | (Hungary) Zoltan Fekete | 6† | 4 | | | | | | | | | 20 |
| — | (Italy) Salvatore de Plano | DNS | DNS | | | | | | | | | 0 |

=== Teams' championship ===
| Pos | Team | No. car | ADR (Italy) | | MNZ (Italy) | | ASS (Netherlands) | | BRN (Czech Republic) | | IMO (Italy) | | Points |
|---|---|---|---|---|---|---|---|---|---|---|---|---|---|
| 1 | (Italy) Torino Squadra Corse | 55 / 155 | 1 | 1 | 8 | 5 | 6 | 4 | 6 | 3 | 2 | 1 | 222 |
| 2 | (Italy) PS Racing | 15 / 115 | 2 | 3 | 15 | 6 | 7 | 5 | 8 | 4 | 4 | Ret | 181 |
| 2 | (Italy) PS Racing | 16 / 116 | DNS | DNS | | | | | | | 8 | 6 | 181 |
| 3 | (Austria) Zele Racing | 7 / 789 | 5 | 2 | 7 | 4 | Ret | 8 | 3 | Ret | | | 162 |
| 3 | (Austria) Zele Racing | 8 | 3 | 5 | | | | | | | | | 162 |
| 3 | (Austria) Zele Racing | 9 | 6 | 4 | | | | | | | | | 162 |
| 3 | (Austria) Zele Racing | 444 | | | | | | | | | 7 | 5 | 162 |
| 4 | (Italy) MM International MotorSport | 33 | 4 | 6 | | | | | | | | | 20 |
| Pos | Team | No. car | ADR (Italy) | | MNZ (Italy) | | ASS (Netherlands) | | BRN (Czech Republic) | | IMO (Italy) | | Points |
