= Antônio Pizzonia =

Brazilian racing driver (born 1980)

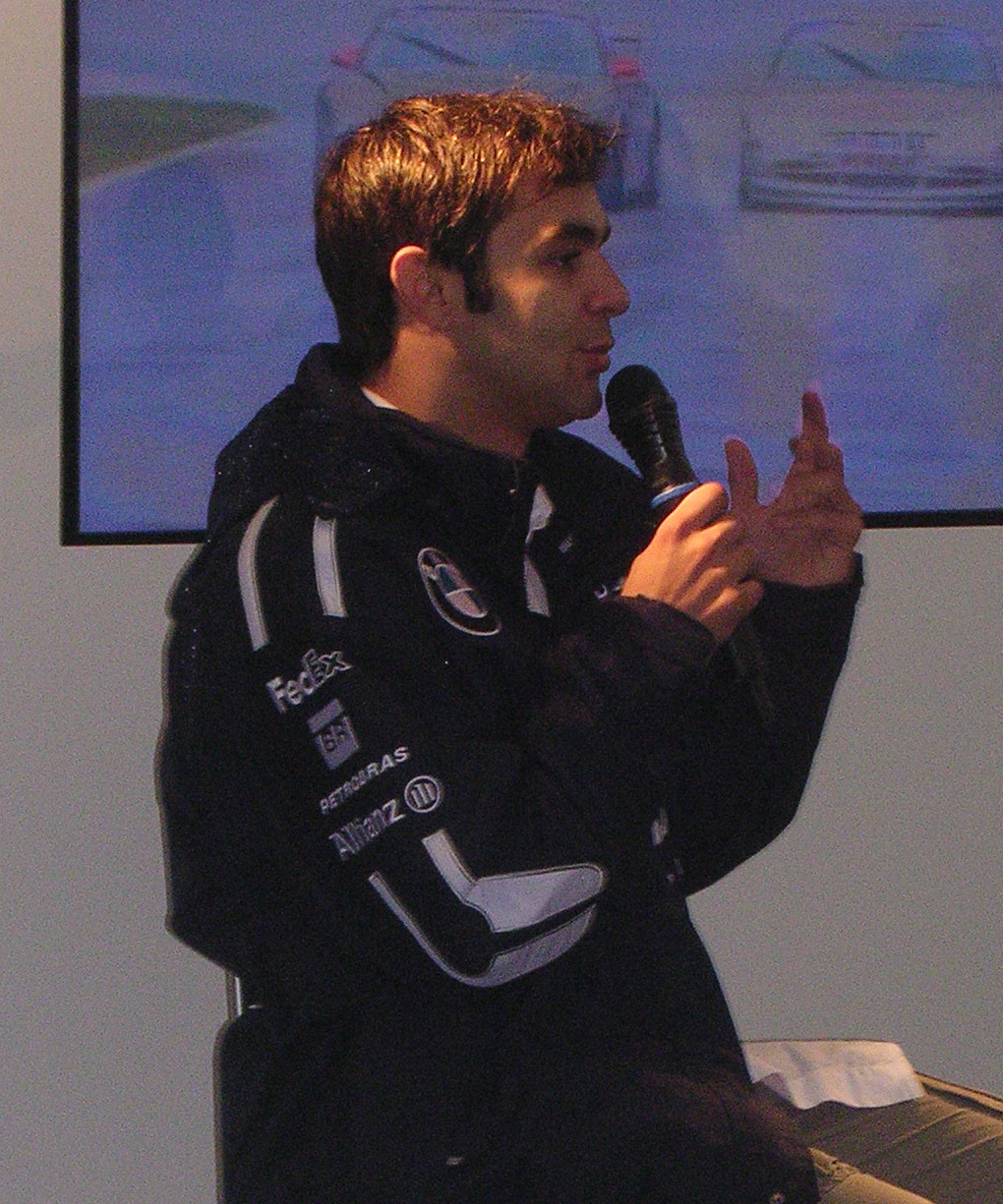
- Pizzonia at the 2004 Italian Grand Prix
- Born: Antônio Reginaldo Pizzonia Júnior; 11 September 1980 (age 46); Manaus, Amazonas, Brazil
- Spouse: Maurren Maggi (m. 2003; div. 2006)

Formula One World Championship career
- Nationality: (Brazil) Brazilian
- Active years: 2003–2005
- Team(s): Jaguar, Williams
- Entries: 20
- Championships: 0
- Wins: 0
- Podiums: 0
- Career points: 8
- Pole positions: 0
- Fastest laps: 0
- First entry: 2003 Australian Grand Prix
- Last entry: 2005 Chinese Grand Prix

Antônio Reginaldo Pizzonia Júnior (born 11 September 1980) is a Brazilian professional racing driver who has raced in Formula One and the Champ Car World Series. Born in Manaus, he started his car racing career in the Formula Vauxhall Junior series in 1997 and then progressed through various junior formulae, winning the Formula Vauxhall Junior Winter Festival in 1997, the Formula Vauxhall Junior and Formula Renault Winter Festival in 1998, the Formula Renault 2.0 UK in 1999, and the British Formula 3 Championship in 2000.

For 2001 and 2002, Pizzonia entered the Formula 3000, with his best championship finish being sixth in 2001. In 2003, he was signed by the Jaguar Formula One team, but following poor results, was released during the season. In 2004, he replaced the injured Ralf Schumacher at Williams in several events, securing his first Formula One points in the process.

In 2005, Pizzonia replaced Nick Heidfeld at Williams, but was released from his contract at the end of the season. Since then, he has competed in multiple series, such as the Champ Car World Series, the Superleague Formula, Stock Car Brasil, and the FIA GT1 World Championship.

== Racing career ==
=== Pre-Formula One ===
From 1991 to 1996, Pizzonia competed in various karting series. In 1997, he moved to Britain and competed in Formula Vauxhall Junior; Pizzonia placed second, and won the Winter Festival. In 1998, in addition to taking the Championship in Formula Vauxhall Junior, he won the Formula Renault Winter Festival.

Pizzonia's 1999 season was even more successful, winning the Formula Renault 2.0 UK series and finishing second in the Formula Renault 2.0 Eurocup. In 2000, Pizzonia took five wins on his way to winning the British Formula 3 Championship, and also winning the Autosport National Racing Driver of the Year Award. For 2001, Pizzonia switched to the Formula 3000 series, winning one race and finishing sixth in the championship.

=== Formula One ===
In 2002, Pizzonia was hired as test driver for Williams, but also continued in F3000, placing eighth. After impressive testing performances, he was signed by the Jaguar team to partner Mark Webber for 2003, replacing the axed Pedro de la Rosa. However, following a string of poor results, he was dropped late in the season and replaced by Minardi's Justin Wilson.

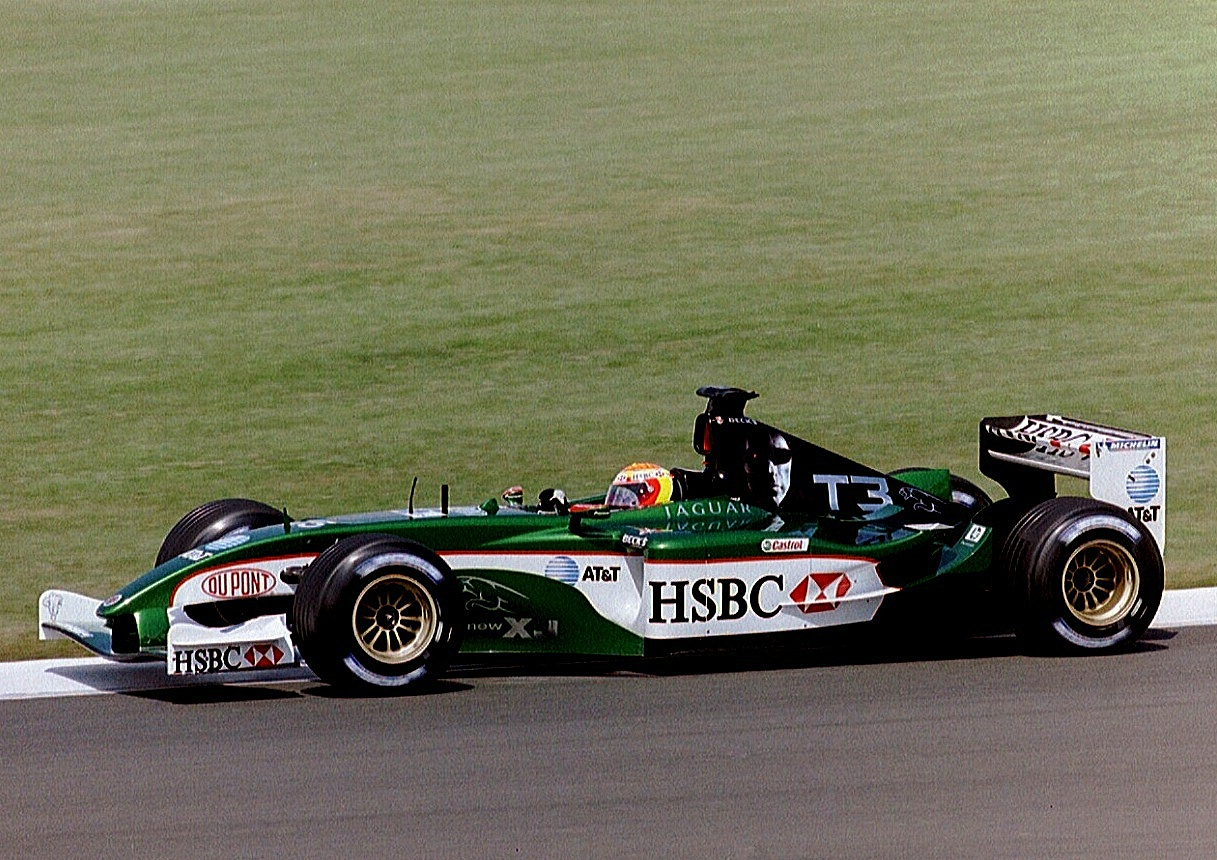
Pizzonia driving for Jaguar during the 2003 British Grand Prix.

In 2004, Pizzonia returned to Williams as test driver. Before the German Grand Prix, it was announced that Pizzonia would take over from Marc Gené, who had been filling in for the injured Ralf Schumacher. At the German Grand Prix, he finished seventh to take his first two career points; he repeated the feat at the Hungarian Grand Prix.

In Belgium, Pizzonia briefly led an F1 race for the first time, but failed to finish the race due to a gearbox problem, whilst running in third place. He claimed a further two points in Italy (during which he achieved the fastest ever recorded top speed in a F1 race at the time, 369.9 km/h, until Juan Pablo Montoya eclipsed this record the following year), but with the announcement of Ralf Schumacher's return for the Chinese Grand Prix, Pizzonia's racing was over for the year.

Prior to the 2005 season, Pizzonia was in a virtual shoot-out with German Nick Heidfeld for the second race seat at Williams alongside Webber. Despite Pizzonia's experience with the team and financial support from Petrobras, Heidfeld was given the seat.

Pizzonia was still employed at Williams as a test driver, and when Heidfeld complained of headaches after being concussed in a crash during the Friday Practice Session at Monza, Pizzonia gained the chance to race. Having not entered an F1 race since the 2004 Italian Grand Prix, the Brazilian qualified sixteenth, coming through the field to emulate his 2004 race result — picking up seventh place and two points. He then raced in the Belgian Grand Prix. where he incurred a fine for taking out second placed Juan Pablo Montoya just a few laps from the end. Pizzonia also took the drive in the Brazilian Grand Prix, but his race was over before the first corner after taking out his own teammate Mark Webber resulting from a collision with David Coulthard.

Despite some speculation that GP2 champion Nico Rosberg would be given an opportunity in the last two races of the season, Pizzonia completed the season for Williams. He retired from the Japanese Grand Prix early after spinning off, and retired from (but was classified as a finisher in) the Chinese Grand Prix after a puncture. Having been replaced by Nico Rosberg for 2006 and failing to find a seat elsewhere, Pizzonia's Formula One career was over.

=== Post-Formula One ===
In 2006, Pizzonia drove for Paul Gentilozzi's Rocketsports team in the Champ Car World Series' Long Beach Grand Prix and returned to the team towards the end of the season for races where Tõnis Kasemets did not have sponsorship to race.

In 2007, Pizzonia was racing for Fisichella Motor Sport in the GP2 series. In May, he was dropped in favour of Adam Carroll after only scoring one point in five races. After that, he returned to Brazil and entered into competition in Stock Car Brasil, a Brazilian national championship, from July. He has competed in the series every year since then, and has also raced in Superleague Formula (SC Corinthians) at 2008, 2009 and 2011, and the FIA GT1 World Championship.

In 2012, Pizzonia made a one-off guest appearance in the Auto GP World Series when the championship visited the Brazilian Curitiba circuit. Driving for the Ombra Racing team, he won both races, immediately slotting himself into ninth position in the championship.

In 2014 and 2015, Pizzonia competed in the Auto GP series, with Zele Racing.

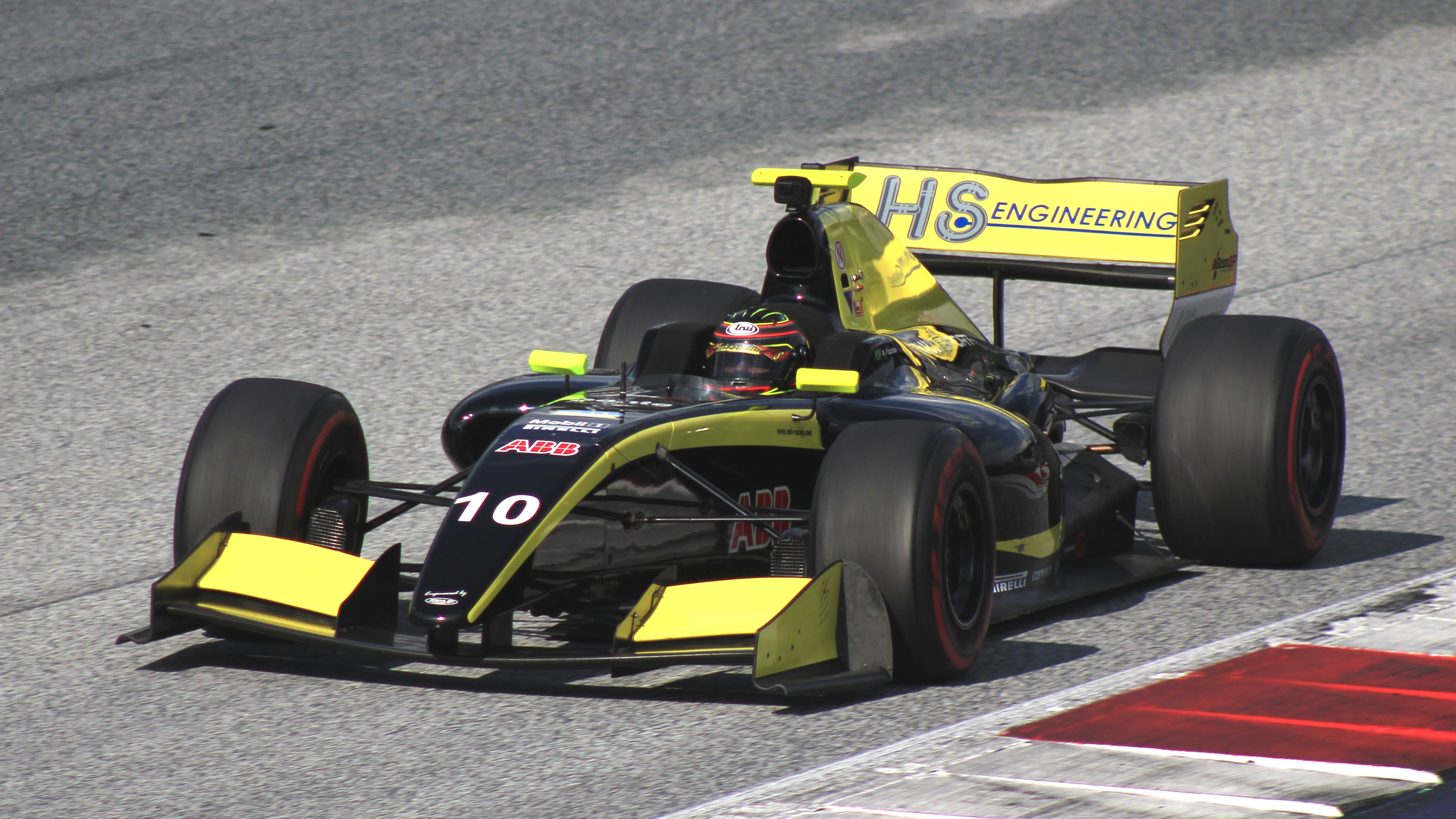
Pizzonia driving for HS Engineering during the Red Bull Ring round.

Pizzonia returned to open-wheel racing in 2023, in the BOSS GP series, with HS Engineering in a Gibson-engined Dallara T12, winning both races overall at the season-opener at Paul Ricard. He has subsequently won every race in his class. He won the Open class title at TT Circuit Assen.

== Personal life ==
Antônio Reginaldo Pizzonia Júnior is the son of Antônio Reginaldo Pizzonia, who was initially a businessman in Manaus before supporting his son's international career. He had a relationship with the athlete Maurren Maggi between 2003 and 2006. They had one daughter, Sophia, born on 20 December 2004. In 2008, he dated singer Alinne Rosa. He is currently married to the blogger and digital influencer Bárbara Balbeque, with whom he has two children, including Antônio Pizzonia Neto (born in 2012), who is currently competing in high-level karting championships in Europe and USA.

On 10 January 2026, Pizzonia was arrested in Montgomery County, Texas, following a physical altercation at the Speedsportz Racing Park during the Superkarts! USA Winter Series. He allegedly intervened in a disagreement involving his son by assaulting another competitor's father with a punch and a "flying kick," leading to his detention on a Class A Misdemeanor charge of Assault Causing Bodily Injury before being released on bail.

== Racing record ==
=== Career summary ===
Season	Series	Team	Races	Wins	Poles	F.Laps	Podiums	Points	Position
1996	Formula Vauxhall Junior Winter Series	?	1	0	0	0	0	0	NC
1997	Formula Vauxhall Junior	John Village Automotive	16	4	?	?	4	142	**2nd**
1997	Formula Vauxhall Junior Winter Series	Lewis Motorsport	1	1	0	0	1	0	**1st**
1998	Formula Vauxhall Junior	Lewis Motorsport	16	8	?	?	8	186	**1st**
1998	Formula Renault 2.0 UK Winter Series	Manor Motorsport	4	4	?	3	4	120	**1st**
1999	Eurocup Formula Renault	Manor Motorsport	9	4	?	?	?	196	**2nd**
1999	Formula Renault 2.0 UK	Manor Motorsport	13	11	12	?	11	402	**1st**
2000	British Formula Three Championship	Manor Motorsport	14	5	3	5	11	200	**1st**
2000	Masters of Formula 3	Manor Motorsport	1	0	0	0	0	0	NC
2000	FIA European Formula 3 Cup	Manor Motorsport	1	0	0	0	0	0	20th
2000	Formula One	Mild Seven Benetton Playlife	Test Driver						
2001	International Formula 3000	Petrobras Junior Team	12	1	1	2	2	22	6th
2002	International Formula 3000	Petrobras Junior Team	12	0	0	0	1	17	8th
2002	Formula One	BMW WilliamsF1 Team	Test Driver						
2003	Formula One	HSBC Jaguar Racing	12	0	0	0	0	0	NC
2004	Formula One	BMW WilliamsF1 Team	4	0	0	0	0	6	15th
2005	Formula One	BMW WilliamsF1 Team	5	0	0	0	0	2	22nd
2006	Champ Car World Series	Rocketsports Racing	4	0	0	0	0	43	18th
2007	GP2 Series	FMS International	5	0	0	0	0	1	27th
2007	Stock Car Brasil	RS Competições	8	0	0	0	0	1	40th
2008	Superleague Formula	SC Corinthians	10	0	0	1	1	264	9th
2008	Stock Car Brasil	Cimed Racing	10	0	0	0	0	6	31st
2008	Champ Car World Series	Rocketsports Racing	1	0	0	1	0	0	NC
2009	Stock Car Brasil	Amir Nasr Racing	6	0	0	0	1	51	15th
2009	Superleague Formula	SC Corinthians	12	0	3	3	3	264	8th
2010	Stock Car Brasil	Hot Car Competições	11	0	0	1	1	31	23rd
2010	GT Brasil	CRT Brasil	14	0	0	1	2	90	16th
2011	Stock Car Brasil	Amir Nasr Racing	2	0	0	1	0	6	26th
2011	Brasileiro de Marcas	Amir Nasr Racing	2	0	0	0	0	17	28th
2011	GT Brasil	CRT Brasil	2	0	0	1	0	7	23rd
2011	Superleague Formula	Team Brazil	4	0	0	1	2	102	8th
2012	Stock Car Brasil	Comprafácil Nascar JF	12	0	0	0	0	83	15th
2012	Campeonato Brasileiro de GT	Mottin Racing	1	0	0	0	0	0	NC
2012	American Le Mans Series - LMP2	Conquest Endurance	1	0	0	0	1	0	NC
2012	Auto GP World Series	Ombra Racing	4	2	0	0	2	45	9th
2013	FIA World Endurance Championship - LMP2	Delta-ADR	2	1	1	0	1	25	15th
2013	Rolex Sports Car Series - DP	Michael Shank Racing	5	0	0	0	0	102	22nd
2014	Stock Car Brasil	Prati-Donaduzzi	20	2	0	1	2	158.5	9th
2014	Auto GP World Series	Zele Racing	2	0	0	1	1	25	14th
2014	Brasileiro de Marcas	Amir Nasr Racing	1	0	0	1	0	0	NC
2015	Stock Car Brasil	Prati-Donaduzzi	21	0	0	0	0	95	18th
2015	Auto GP World Series	Zele Racing	4	2	1	2	4	79	**1st**
2016	FIA World Endurance Championship - LMP2	Manor Motorsport	1	0	0	0	0	10	27th
2016	Brasileiro de Marcas	C2 Team	1	0	0	0	0	0	NC
2016	Porsche Endurance Series - Cup	?	1	0	0	0	0	40	37th
2017	Stock Car Brasil	Prati-Donaduzzi	22	0	0	0	1	124	13th
2018	Stock Car Brasil	Prati-Donaduzzi	22	0	0	1	0	44	21st
2021	Porsche Endurance Series	?	1	1	0	0	1	116	7th
2023	BOSS GP - Open Class	HS Engineering	14	14	7	14	14	352	**1st**
2024	BOSS GP - Open Class	HS Engineering	10	8	5	9	9	257	**1st**
2026	Stock Car Pro Series	TMG Racing	1	0	0	0	0	59	37th*

^{*} Season still in progress.

=== Complete British Formula Three Championship results ===
(key) (Races in bold indicate pole position) (Races in italics indicate fastest lap)

Year	Entrant	Chassis	Engine	Class	1	2	3	4	5	6	7	8	9	10	11	12	13	14	DC	Points
2000	Manor Motorsport	Dallara F399	Mugen-Honda	Championship	THR; 1	CRO; 1	**OUL**; 2	DON; 11	DON; 2	SIL; 2	BRH; 1	**DON**; 1	DON; 3	CRO; Ret	SIL; 2	**SNE**; 1	SPA; 2	SIL; 9	1st	200

=== Complete International Formula 3000 results ===
(key) (Races in bold indicate pole position) (Races in italics indicate fastest lap)

Year	Entrant	1	2	3	4	5	6	7	8	9	10	11	12	DC	Points
2001	Petrobras Junior Team	INT; 9	IMO; 4	CAT; 6	A1R; 4	MON; Ret	NÜR; 6	MAG; 10	SIL; 3	HOC; 1	HUN; Ret	SPA; 8	**MNZ**; Ret	6th	22
2002	Petrobras Junior Team	INT; 4	IMO; 4	CAT; 10	A1R; 7	MON; 4	NÜR; 3	SIL; 5	MAG; 4	HOC; Ret	HUN; Ret	SPA; Ret	MNZ; DSQ	8th	18

=== Complete Formula One results ===
(key)

Year	Entrant	Chassis	Engine	1	2	3	4	5	6	7	8	9	10	11	12	13	14	15	16	17	18	19	WDC	Points
2003	Jaguar Racing F1 Team	Jaguar R4	Cosworth V10	AUS; 13^{†}	MAL; Ret	BRA; Ret	SMR; 14	ESP; Ret	AUT; 9	MON; Ret	CAN; 10^{†}	EUR; 10	FRA; 10	GBR; Ret	GER	HUN	ITA	USA	JPN				21st	0
2004	BMW WilliamsF1 Team	Williams FW26	BMW P84 3.0 V10	AUS	MAL	BHR	SMR	ESP	MON	EUR	CAN	USA	FRA	GBR	GER; 7	HUN; 7	BEL; Ret	ITA; 7	CHN	JPN	BRA		15th	6
2005	BMW WilliamsF1 Team	Williams FW27	BMW P84/5 3.0 V10	AUS	MAL	BHR	SMR	ESP	MON	EUR	CAN	USA	FRA	GBR	GER	HUN	TUR	ITA; 7	BEL; 15^{†}	BRA; Ret	JPN; Ret	CHN; 13^{†}	22nd	2

^{†} Driver did not finish the Grand Prix, but was classified as he completed over 90% of the race distance.

=== American open wheel Racing ===
(key)

==== Complete Champ Car results ====
Yr	Team	No.	1	2	3	4	5	6	7	8	9	10	11	12	13	14	Rank	Points	Ref
2006	Rocketsports	8	LBH; 10	HOU	MTY	MIL	POR	CLE	TOR	EDM	SJO	DEN					18th	43	
2006	Rocketsports	18											MTL; 11	ROA	SRF; 10	MXC; 12	18th	43	

==== IndyCar ====
Year	Team	No.	Chassis	Engine	1	2	3	4	5	6	7	8	9	10	11	12	13	14	15	16	17	18	19	Rank	Points	Ref
2008	Rocketsports	9	Panoz DP01	Cosworth	HMS	STP	MOT^{1}	LBH^{1} 16	KAN	IND	MIL	TXS	IOW	RIR	WGL	NSH	MDO	EDM	KTY	SNM	DET	CHI	SRF^{2}	45th	0	

¹ Run on same day
² Non-points-paying, exhibition race

=== Complete GP2 Series results ===
(key) (Races in bold indicate pole position) (Races in italics indicate fastest lap)

Year	Entrant	1	2	3	4	5	6	7	8	9	10	11	12	13	14	15	16	17	18	19	20	21	DC	Points
2007	Petrol Ofisi FMS International	BHR; FEA; 16	BHR; SPR; Ret	CAT; FEA; Ret	CAT; SPR; 8	MON; FEA; 8	FRA; FEA	FRA; SPR	GBR; FEA	GBR; SPR	EUR; FEA	EUR; SPR	HUN; FEA	HUN; SPR	TUR; FEA	TUR; SPR	ITA; FEA	ITA; SPR	BEL; FEA	BEL; SPR	VAL; FEA	VAL; SPR	27th	1

=== Brazilian competitions ===
==== Stock Car Brasil ====
Year	Team	Car	1	2	3	4	5	6	7	8	9	10	11	12	13	14	15	16	17	18	19	20	21	22	23	Rank	Points
2007	RS Competições	Volkswagen Bora	INT	CTB	CGD	INT	LON; 33	SCZ; 15	CTB; DNQ	BSB; Ret	ARG; DSQ	TAR; Ret	RIO; Ret	INT; 18												40th	1
2008	K-Med Racing	Peugeot 307	SAO; 15	BSB; Ret	CTB; DSQ	SCZ; Ret	CGD; 14	SAO; 24	RIO; 16	LON; Ret	CTB	BSB; 18	TAR	SAO; 11												31st	8
2009	Amir Nasr Racing	Peugeot 307	SAO; 3	CTB; 4	BSB; Ret	SCZ; 4	SAO; 9	SAL; 20	RIO	CGD	CTB	BSB	TAR	SAO												15th	51
2010	Bardahl Hot Car	Chevrolet Vectra	SAO; 16	CTB; Ret	VEL; Ret	RIO; Ret	RBP; 3	SAL; Ret	SAO; Ret	CGD; 8	LON; 14	SCS; 18	BSB; 12	CTB; Ret												23rd	31
2011	Amir Nasr Racing	Peugeot 408	CTB	SAO	RBP; Ret	VEL	CGD	RIO																		26th	6
2011	Scuderia 111	Peugeot 408							SAO; 10	SAL	SCS	LON	BSB	VEL												26th	6
2012	JF Racing	Peugeot 408	INT; 30	CTB; 11	VEL; 17	RBP; Ret	LON; 10	RIO; 4	SAL; Ret	CGD; 26	TAR; 18	CUR; 7	BRA; 25	INT; 10												15th	81
2014	Prati-Mico's Racing	Peugeot 408	INT; 1; 21	SCZ; 1; 11	SCZ; 2; 1	BRA; 1 Ret	BRA; 2 DNS	GOI; 1; 12	GOI; 2; 7	GOI; 1; 6	CAS; 1; 11	CAS; 2; 8	CUR; 1; 12	CUR; 2; 21	VEL; 1; 13	VEL; 2; 10	SCZ; 1; 7	SCZ; 2; 4	TAR; 1; 10	**TAR**; **2**; 1	SAL; 1; 6	SAL; 2; 22	CUR; 1; 22			9th	158.5
2015	Prati-Mico's Racing	Peugeot 408	GOI; 1; 25	RBP; 1; 10	RBP; 2; 9	VEL; 1; 24	VEL; 2; 12	CUR; 1; 4	CUR; 2; 11	SCZ; 1 NC	SCZ; 2 Ret	CUR; 1; 14	CUR; 2; 9	GOI; 1; 17	CAS; 1; 26	CAS; 2; 11	MOU; 1; 16	MOU; 2 Ret	CUR; 1; 18	CUR; 2; 7	TAR; 1; 14	TAR; 2; 13	INT; 1; 15			18th	97
2016	Voxx Racing	Peugeot 408	CUR; 1; 1	VEL; 1	VEL; 2	GOI; 1	GOI; 2	SCZ; 1	SCZ; 2	TAR; 1	TAR; 2	CAS; 1	CAS; 2	INT; 1	LON; 1	LON; 2	CUR; 1	CUR; 2	GOI; 1	GOI; 2	CDC; 1	CDC; 2	INT; 1			NC†	0†
2017	Prati-Donaduzzi	Chevrolet Cruze	GOI; 1 Ret	GOI; 2; 12	VEL; 1; 14	VEL; 2 Ret	SCZ; 1 Ret	SCZ; 2; 2	CAS; 1; 22	CAS; 2 Ret	CUR; 1 DSQ	CRI; 1; 20	CRI; 2; 15	VCA; 1; 5	VCA; 2; 6	LON; 1; 10	**LON**; **2**; 4	ARG; 1; 12	ARG; 2; 8	TAR; 1; 5	TAR; 2 Ret	GOI; 1 Ret	GOI; 2; 11	INT; 1; 20		16th	126
2018	Prati-Donaduzzi	Chevrolet Cruze	INT; 1; 14	CUR; 1; 23	CUR; 2; 5	VEL; 1; 24	VEL; 2 Ret	LON; 1; 15	LON; 2 DSQ	SCZ; 1 Ret	SCZ; 2; 11	GOI; 1 Ret	MOU; 1 Ret	MOU; 2 Ret	CAS; 1; 15	CAS; 2; 8	VCA; 1 Ret	VCA; 2; 24	TAR; 1; 13	TAR; 2 Ret	GOI; 1 Ret	GOI; 2; 14	INT; 1; 8			21st	44
2026	TMG Racing	Chevrolet Tracker	CRS; 1	CRS; 2	CAS; 1	CAS; 2	INT; 1	INT; 2	GOI; 1	GOI; 2	CUI; 1	CUI; 2	VCA; 1	VCA; 2	SCZ; 1	SCZ; 2	CRS; 1	CRS; 2	BRA; 1; 5	CAS; 1	CAS; 2	VEL; 1	VEL; 2	INT; 1	INT; 2	37th*	59*

^{†} Ineligible for championship points. ^{*} Season still in progress.

=== Complete Superleague Formula results ===
(key) (Races in bold indicate pole position) (Races in italics indicate fastest lap)

Year	Team	1	2	3	4	5	6	7	8	9	10	11	12	Pos	Pts
2008	SC Corinthians EuroInternational	DON; 1	DON; 2	NÜR; 1; 7	NÜR; 2; 10	ZOL; 1; 10	ZOL; 2; 18	EST; 1; 4	EST; 2; 4	VLL; 1; 6	VLL; 2; 16	JER; 1; 12	JER; 2; 2	9th	264
2009	SC Corinthians Alan Docking Racing	**MAG**; **1**; 4	MAG; 2; 9	ZOL; 1; 17	**ZOL**; **2**; 12	**DON**; **1**; 3	DON; 2; 8	**EST**; **1**; 3	EST; 2; 5	MNZ; 1; 10	MNZ; 2; 9	JAR; 1; 14	JAR; 2; 18	8th	264
2011	Brazil Alan Docking Racing	ASS; 1; 8	ASS; 2; 3	ZOL; 1; 9	ZOL; 2; 12									8th	102

==== Super Final Results ====
- Super Final results in 2009 did not count for points towards the main championship.

Year	Team	1	2	3	4	5	6
2009	SC Corinthians Alan Docking Racing	MAG; 3	ZOL; N/A	DON; 4	EST; 5	MNZ; N/A	JAR; DNQ
2011	Brazil Alan Docking Racing	ASS; 2	ZOL; DNQ				

=== Complete Auto GP results ===
(key) (Races in bold indicate pole position) (Races in italics indicate fastest lap)

Year	Entrant	1	2	3	4	5	6	7	8	9	10	11	12	13	14	15	16	Pos	Points
2012	Ombra Racing	MNZ; 1	MNZ; 2	VAL; 1	VAL; 2	MAR; 1	MAR; 2	HUN; 1	HUN; 2	ALG; 1	ALG; 2	CUR; 1; 1	CUR; 2; 1					9th	45
2012	Zele Racing													SON; 1 Ret	SON; 2; 12†			9th	45
2014	Zele Racing	MAR; 1	MAR; 2	LEC; 1	LEC; 2	HUN; 1	HUN; 2	MNZ; 1	MNZ; 2	IMO; 1	IMO; 2	RBR; 1	RBR; 2	NÜR; 1	NÜR; 2	EST; 1; 4	EST; 2; 3	14th	25
2015	Zele Racing	**HUN**; **1**; 2	HUN; 2; 1	SIL; 1; 1	SIL; 2; 3													1st‡	79‡

^{‡} Position when season was cancelled.

=== Complete FIA World Endurance Championship results ===
Year	Entrant	Class	Car	Engine	1	2	3	4	5	6	7	8	9	Rank	Points
2013	Delta-ADR	LMP2	Oreca 03	Nissan VK45DE 4.5 L V8	**SIL**; 1	SPA; Ret	LMS	SÃO	COA	FUJ	SHA	BHR		15th	26
2016	Manor	LMP2	Oreca 05	Nissan VK45DE 4.5 L V8	SIL	SPA	LMS	NÜR; 5	MEX	COA	FUJ	SHA	BHR	27th	10

=== Complete BOSS GP Series results ===
(key) (Races in bold indicate pole position; races in italics indicate points for the fastest lap of top ten finishers)

Year	Entrant	Car	Class	1	2	3	4	5	6	7	8	9	10	11	12	13	14	DC	Points
2023	HS Engineering	Dallara T12	Open	**HOC**; **1**; 1	HOC; 2; 1	**LEC**; **1**; 1	LEC; 2; 1	**RBR**; **1**; 2	RBR; 2; 1	**MIS**; **1**; 1	MIS; 2; 1	**ASS**; **1**; 2	ASS; 2; 1	**MNZ**; **1**; 1	MNZ; 2; 1	**MUG**; **1**; 11	MUG; 2; 1	1st	352

Sporting positions
Preceded by Aluizio Coelho	Formula Renault UK champion 1999	Succeeded by Kimi Räikkönen
Preceded by Marc Hynes	British Formula Three Champion; 2000	Succeeded by Takuma Sato
Awards and achievements
Preceded by Laurent Aïello	Autosport; National Racing Driver of the Year; 2000	Succeeded by Takuma Sato
