= Loris Spinelli =

Italian racing driver

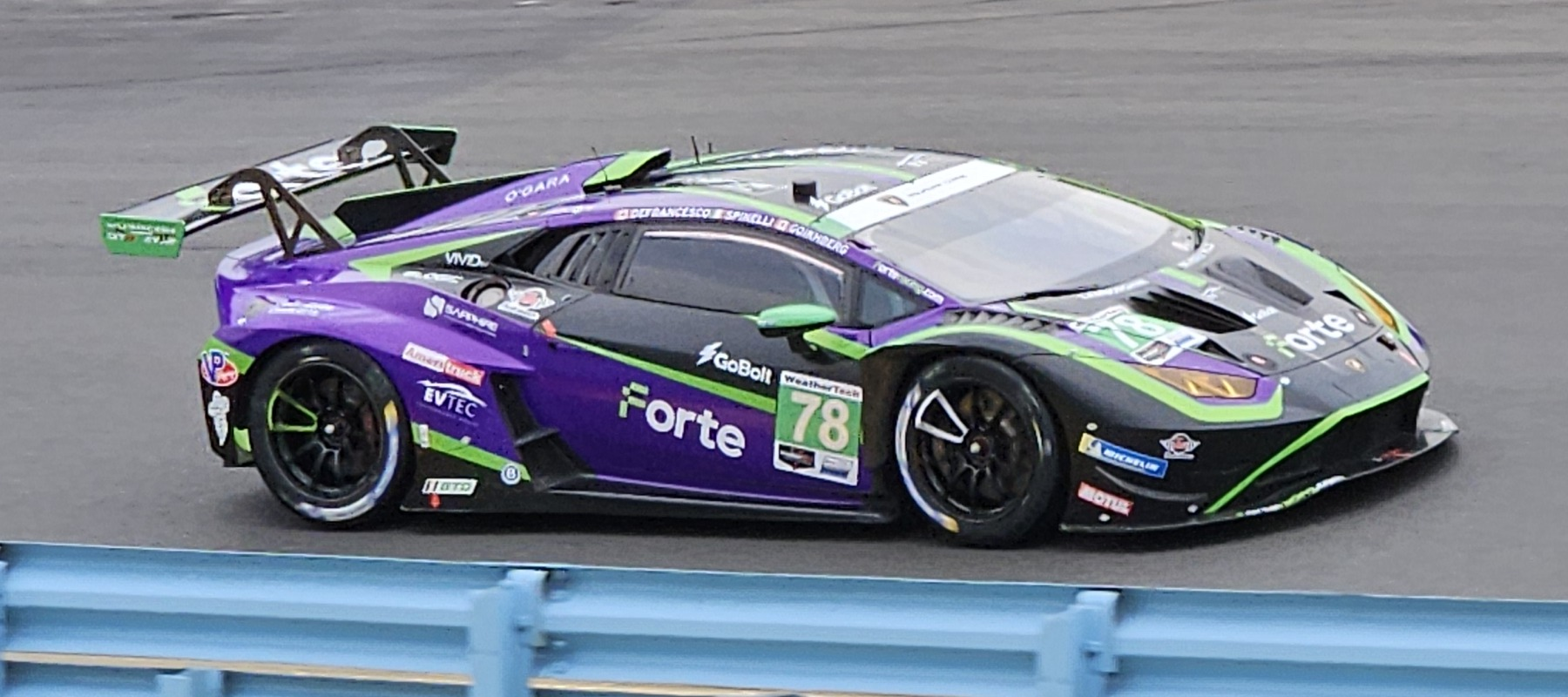
- Spinelli in 2024
- Nationality: (Italy) Italian
- Born: 30 December 1995 (age 30) Atri, Italy
- Categorisation: FIA Silver (until 2022); FIA Gold (2023–)

Championship titles
- 2022: Lamborghini Super Trofeo Europe

Loris Spinelli Boggi (born 30 December 1995) is an Italian racing driver. He currently competes in the IMSA SportsCar Championship for Forte Racing. Since 2024, Spinelli has been employed as a factory driver for Lamborghini's GT3 program.

== Career ==
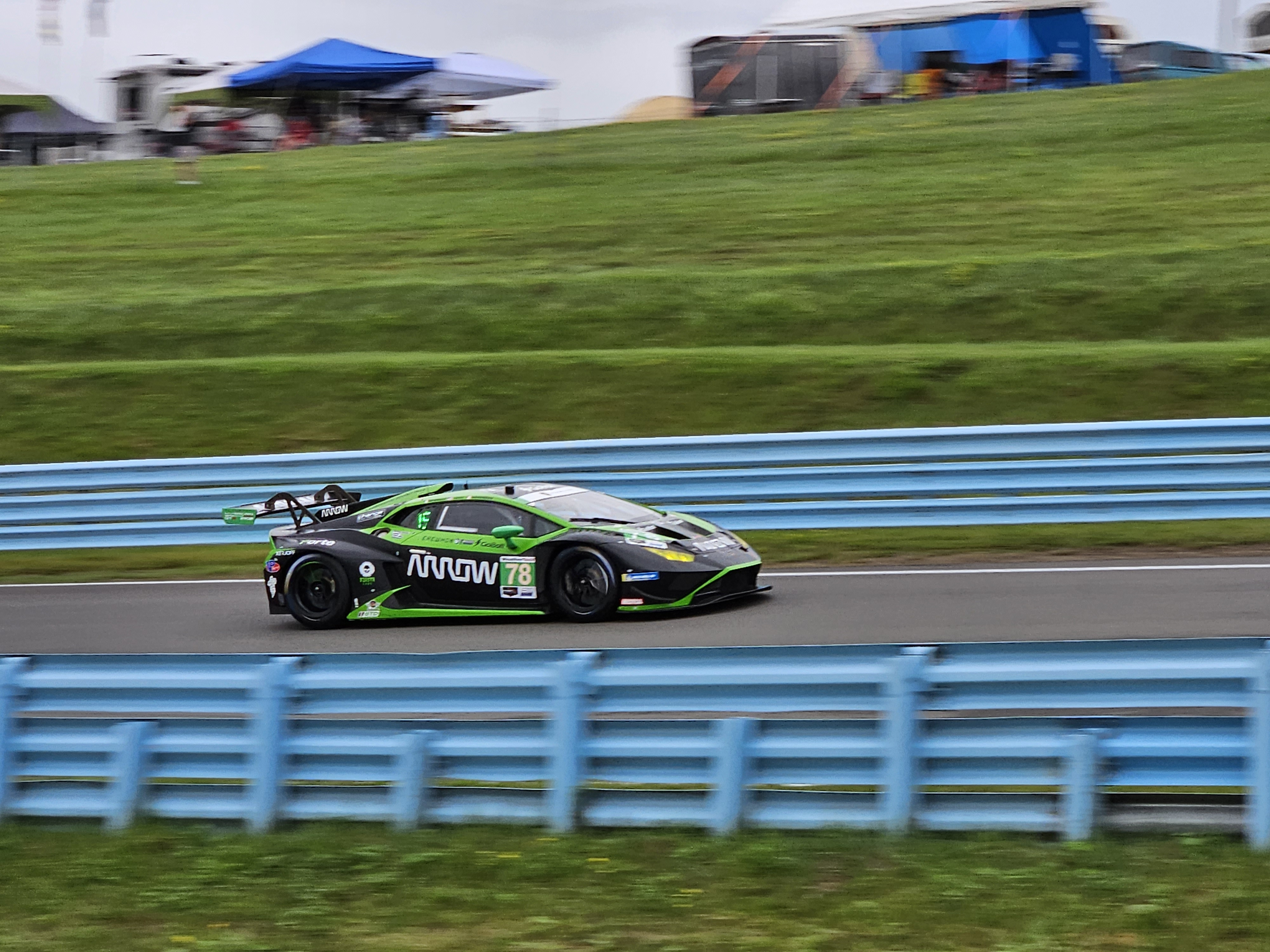
The Lamborghini Huracán GT3 Evo 2 shared by Spinelli, Misha Goikhberg, and Patrick Liddy racing at Watkins Glen International in 2023

Spinelli began racing in karts, and saw success in the early 2010s, including winning the KF2 World Cup in 2011.

In 2015, Spinelli made the transition to car racing, competing in the Lamborghini Super Trofeo series. He won the Super Trofeo European championship in the Pro class in 2017 and in 2022, while also collecting Pro-Am class championships in 2015 and 2018 and winning several races in the North American championship.

In 2022, Spinelli began to compete in the United States, initially joining the GT World Challenge America series before finding a full-time ride in the IMSA SportsCar Championship for 2023 with Forte Racing. For 2024, Spinelli was announced as an official factory driver for Lamborghini for the manufacturer's GT3 racing program.

== Personal life ==
Spinelli was born in Atri, Abruzzo, Italy. He moved to the United States in 2022 and currently resides in Palm Beach Gardens, Florida.

== Racing record ==
=== Career summary ===
Season	Series	Team	Races	Wins	Poles	F/Laps	Podiums	Points	Position
2013	Formula Abarth	Best Lap	3	0	0	0	1	18	13th
2014	Auto GP Series	Eurotech Engineering	8	0	0	0	0	19	17th
2015	Auto GP Series	Paolo Coloni Racing	0	0	0	0	0	0	NC
2015	Lamborghini Super Trofeo Europe - Pro-Am	Antonelli Motorsport	12	2	2	5	6	115	**1st**
2016	Italian GT Championship - Super GT3	Solaris Motorsport	2	0	0	0	0	7	22nd
2016	Italian GT Championship - Super GT Cup	Antonelli Motorsport	6	0	2	0	1	47	15th
2016	Lamborghini Super Trofeo Europe - Pro	Antonelli Motorsport	9	1	1	4	4	63	6th
2016	Lamborghini Super Trofeo World Final - Pro	Antonelli Motorsport	2	0	2	0	1	14	4th
2016	Blancpain GT Series Endurance Cup	Antonelli Motorsport	1	0	0	0	0	0	NC
2017	Lamborghini Super Trofeo Europe - Pro	Antonelli Motorsport	12	6	3	4	9	142	**1st**
2017	Lamborghini Super Trofeo World Final - Pro	Antonelli Motorsport	2	0	0	0	1	?	?
2018	Italian GT Championship - GT3	Antonelli Motorsport	4	0	0	1	1	25	21st
2018	Blancpain GT Series Endurance Cup	Antonelli Motorsport	1	0	0	0	0	0	NC
2018	Lamborghini Super Trofeo Europe - Pro	Antonelli Motorsport	12	5	4	3	8	96	**1st**
2018	International GT Open	Target Racing	2	0	0	0	0	8	27th
2018	Lamborghini Super Trofeo North America - Pro	P1 Motorsports	12	10	6	8	11	137	**1st**
2018	Lamborghini Super Trofeo World Final - Pro	P1 Motorsports	2	1	0	0	2	25	**1st**
2018	IMSA SportsCar Championship - GTD	P1 Motorsports	3	0	0	0	0	47	40th
2019	International GT Open	Antonelli MotorSport	6	0	0	0	2	38	7th
2019	Lamborghini Super Trofeo Europe - Pro-Am	Target Racing	4	2	2	2	3	43	6th
2019	Lamborghini Super Trofeo World Final - Pro-Am	Van der Horst Motorsport	2	0	1	1	2	21	**2nd**
2020	Italian GT Championship - Endurance - GT3	AKM Motorsport	1	0	0	1	0	0	NC
2020	Italian GT Championship - Sprint - GT3	AKM Motorsport	8	1	0	0	1	41	9th
2020	Lamborghini Super Trofeo Europe - Pro-Am	Van der Horst Motorsport	2	0	0	0	2	?	?
2021	International GT Open - Pro	AKM Motorsport	2	1	1	1	2	65	5th
2021	International GT Open - Pro-Am	AKM Motorsport	10	2	1	5	4	47	4th
2021	Lamborghini Super Trofeo North America - Pro-Am	Taurino Racing	9	0	4	7	2	69	**3rd**
2022	Formula 4 UAE Championship	AKM Motorsport	4	0	0	0	0	10	22nd
2022	GT World Challenge Europe Endurance Cup	Sky - Tempesta Racing by HRT	1	0	0	0	0	0	NC
2022	GT World Challenge America - Pro	SADA Systems/USRT	10	0	5	3	4	115	7th
2022	Lamborghini Super Trofeo Europe - Pro	Bonaldi Motorsport	4	4	2	4	4	?	**1st**
2022	Lamborghini Super Trofeo North America - Pro	Taurino Racing by D Motorsports	12	4	?	?	6	125	**2nd**
2022	Intercontinental GT Challenge	US RaceTronics							
2023	IMSA SportsCar Championship - GTD	Forte Racing powered by US RaceTronics	11	1	1	1	2	2921	5th
2023	Lamborghini Super Trofeo Europe - Pro-Am	Vincenzo Sospiri Racing	10	6	3	3	6	?	?
2023	Lamborghini Super Trofeo World Final - Pro-Am	Vincenzo Sospiri Racing	2	0	0	2	0	8	6th
2023	GT World Challenge Europe Sprint Cup	Imperiale Racing	2	0	0	0	0	0	NC
2024	IMSA SportsCar Championship - GTD	Forte Racing	10	0	0	5	2	2554	5th
2024	GT World Challenge Europe Endurance Cup	Iron Lynx	1	0	0	0	0	6	26th
2025	GT World Challenge Europe Sprint Cup	Imperiale Racing	8	0	0	0	0	0	NC
2025	GT World Challenge Europe Sprint Cup - Bronze	Imperiale Racing	8	1	0	0	4	63.5	**3rd**
2025	GT World Challenge Asia	Absolute Corse	4	0	0	0	0	16	29th
2025	GT World Challenge Europe Endurance Cup	VSR	1	0	0	0	0	0	NC
2025	Italian GT Championship Sprint Cup - GT3	VSR	4	0	0	0	2	0	NC†
2026	GT World Challenge Europe Sprint Cup	VSR	10	0	0	0	0	8.5	23rd
2026	Italian GT Championship Endurance Cup - GT3	VSR	2	0	0	0	0	11	NC†
2026	Italian GT Championship Sprint Cup - GT3	Oregon Team	2	0	0	0	0	0	NC†
2026	GT World Challenge America - Pro-Am	Chicago Performance and Tuning Co.	1	0	0	0	0	0	NC†

† Guest driver; ineligible for championship points

=== Complete Formula Abarth results ===
(key) (Races in bold indicate pole position; results in italics indicate fastest lap)

Year	Entrant	1	2	3	4	5	6	7	8	9	10	11	12	13	14	15	16	17	18	Pos.	Points
2013	Best Lap	VLL; 1; 9	VLL; 2; 10	VLL; 3; 3	ADR; 1	ADR; 2	ADR; 3	MUG; 1	MUG; 2	MUG; 3	IMO; 1	IMO; 2	IMO; 3	MIS; 1	MIS; 2	MIS; 3	MNZ; 1	MNZ; 2	MNZ; 3	13th	18

=== Complete Auto GP Series results ===
(key) (Races in bold indicate pole position; results in italics indicate fastest lap)

Year	Entrant	1	2	3	4	5	6	7	8	9	10	11	12	13	14	15	16	Pos.	Points
2014	Eurotech Engineering	MAR; 1; 6	MAR; 2 Ret	LEC; 1; 6	LEC; 2 Ret	HUN; 1; 11	HUN; 2; 8	MNZ; 1 Ret	MNZ; 2; 11	IMO; 1 WD	IMO; 2 WD	RBR; 1	RBR; 2	NÜR; 1	NÜR; 2	EST; 1	EST; 2	17th	19
2015	Paolo Coloni Racing	HUN; 1	HUN; 2	SIL; 1 WD	SIL; 2 WD													NC	0

=== Complete GT World Challenge Europe results ===
==== GT World Challenge Europe Endurance Cup ====
(key) (Races in bold indicate pole position; results in italics indicate fastest lap)

Year	Team	Car	Class	1	2	3	4	5	6	7	Pos.	Points
2016	Antonelli Motorsport	Lamborghini Huracán GT3	Pro-Am	MNZ	SIL	LEC	SPA; 6H; 33	SPA; 12H; 41	SPA; 24H; 28	NÜR	50th	1
2018	Antonelli Motorsport	Lamborghini Huracán GT3	Pro-Am	MNZ	SIL	LEC	SPA; 6H; 43	SPA; 12H; 42	SPA; 24H; 46	CAT	26th	4
2022	Sky - Tempesta Racing by HRT	Mercedes-AMG GT3 Evo	Gold	IMO	LEC	SPA; 6H; 32	SPA; 12H; 36	SPA; 24H; 26	HOC	CAT	14th	24
2024	Iron Lynx	Lamborghini Huracán GT3 Evo 2	Pro	LEC	SPA; 6H	SPA; 12H	SPA; 24H	NÜR	MNZ	JED; 7	26th	6
2025	VSR	Lamborghini Huracán GT3 Evo 2	Pro	LEC	MNZ	SPA; 6H	SPA; 12H	SPA; 24H	NÜR	CAT; 21	NC	0

==== GT World Challenge Europe Sprint Cup ====
(key) (Races in bold indicate pole position; results in italics indicate fastest lap)

Year	Team	Car	Class	1	2	3	4	5	6	7	8	9	10	Pos.	Points
2023	Imperiale Racing	Lamborghini Huracán GT3 Evo	Bronze	MIS; 1 Ret	**MIS**; **2**; 33	HOC; 1	HOC; 2	VAL; 1	VAL; 2					17th	2
2025	Imperiale Racing	Lamborghini Huracán GT3 Evo 2	Bronze	ZAN; 1; 26	ZAN; 2; 35	MIS; 1; 26	MIS; 2; 26	MAG; 1; 28	MAG; 2; 27	VAL; 1; 17	VAL; 2; 30			3rd	63.5
2026	VSR	Lamborghini Temerario GT3	Gold	BRH; 1; 28	BRH; 2; 23	MIS; 1; 36	MIS; 2; 12	MAG; 1; 22	MAG; 2 Ret	ZAN; 1; 10	ZAN; 2; 17	CAT; 1; 15	CAT; 2; 4	5th	71.5

=== Complete IMSA SportsCar Championship results ===
(key) (Races in bold indicate pole position; results in italics indicate fastest lap)

Year	Team	Class	Make	Engine	1	2	3	4	5	6	7	8	9	10	11	Pos.	Points	Ref
2018	P1 Motorsports	GTD	Mercedes-AMG GT3	Mercedes-Benz M159 6.2 L V8	DAY; 12	SEB; 18	MOH	BEL	WGL; 16	MOS	LIM	ELK	VIR	LGA	PET	40th	47	
2023	Forte Racing	GTD	Lamborghini Huracán GT3 Evo 2	Lamborghini DGF 5.2 L V10	DAY; 7	SEB; 17	LBH; 7	LGA; 9	WGL; 7	MOS; 14	LIM; 5	ELK; 4	VIR; 13	IMS; 2	PET; 1	5th	2921	
2024	Forte Racing	GTD	Lamborghini Huracán GT3 Evo 2	Lamborghini DGF 5.2 L V10	DAY; 16	SEB; 5	LBH; 11	LGA; 8	WGL; 14	MOS; 9	ELK; 14	VIR; 2	IMS; 4	PET; 2		5th	2554	

=== Complete Formula 4 UAE Championship results ===
(key) (Races in bold indicate pole position) (Races in italics indicate fastest lap)

Year	Team	1	2	3	4	5	6	7	8	9	10	11	12	13	14	15	16	17	18	19	20	DC	Points
2022	AKM Motorsport	YAS1; 1	YAS1; 2	YAS1; 3	YAS1; 4	DUB1; 1 Ret	DUB1; 2 Ret	DUB1; 3; 17	DUB1; 4; 5	DUB2; 1	DUB2; 2	DUB2; 3	DUB2; 4	DUB3; 1	DUB3; 2	DUB3; 3	DUB3; 4	YAS2; 1	YAS2; 2	YAS2; 3	YAS2; 4	22nd	10
