= Andrés Méndez =

Colombian racing driver (born 1992)

- Nationality: (Colombia) Colombian
- Born: July 30, 1992 (age 34) Bogotá, Colombia

Auto GP World Series career
- Debut season: 2015
- Current team: Zele Racing
- Categorisation: FIA Silver (until 2024); FIA Bronze (2025–)
- Car number: 9
- Starts: 4
- Wins: 0
- Poles: 0
- Fastest laps: 0

Previous series
- 2012 2013 2014: Star Mazda Championship (Team GDT); Formula Renault 2.0 Northern European Cup (Mark Burdett Motorsport); German Formula Three Championship (Team Lotus Motopark)

Andrés Méndez (born July 30, 1992) is a Colombian racing driver.

== Racing career ==
Méndez began kart racing in 2008, encouraged by his father and grandfather, who were both professional racers. He raced in the Easykart Colombia Junior Class, finishing in fourth place at the end of the season. In 2009, he finished second in the KZ2 Class Open Colombia, and was recognized as ¨Rookie of the Year¨. He also raced internationally at the Industry Cup in Pomposa, Italy, and participated in an Easykart World Grand Final in Siena, Italy.

Méndez attended the Jim Russell Racing Driver School, and won the Six Hours of Bogotá in the FL2000 class.

In 2010, Méndez took part in the Florida Winter Tour in the Tag Senior class. He was selected to be part of the Jim Russell's Future Drive test, guided by Allan McNish. At the end of this year, he again won the Six Hours of Bogotá in a FL2000.

In 2011, Méndez finished fourth in the Florida Winter Tour championship. He advanced to the third round of the Regional Rotax Max Challenge USA. He was selected to join the Ferrari Driver Academy, and did his first test in Fiorano, Italy, gaining experience in a Formula Abarth 1.6 turbo engine and Tatuus chassis. Near the end of the year he tested with Koiranen Brothers Motorsport Team in a Formula Renault 2.0 at Estoril. He finished the season winning the Six Hours of Bogotá for the third time.

In 2012, Méndez signed with Team GDT to compete in the Star Mazda Championship. Méndez finished 14th in points with a best finish of seventh at Circuit Trois-Rivières.

In 2013, Méndez drove in the Formula Renault 2.0 Northern European Cup with Mark Burdett Motorsport and finished 35th in points with a best finish of 13th at Silverstone

In 2014, Méndez signed with the German Formula Three Championship's Team Lotus Motopark.

For 2015, Méndez would race for Zele Racing in the Auto GP World Series.

== Racing record ==
=== Star Mazda Championship ===
Year	Team	1	2	3	4	5	6	7	8	9	10	11	12	13	14	15	16	17	Rank	Points
2012	Team GDT	STP; 15	STP; 14	BAR; 14	BAR; 17	IND; 12	IOW; 11	TOR; 18	TOR; 10	EDM; 11	EDM; DSQ	TRO; 13	TRO; 7	BAL; 12	BAL; 18	LAG; 15	LAG; 15	ATL; 15	**14th**	**128**

=== Complete Formula Renault 2.0 NEC results ===
(key) (Races in bold indicate pole position) (Races in italics indicate fastest lap)

Year	Entrant	1	2	3	4	5	6	7	8	9	10	11	12	13	14	15	16	17	DC	Points
2013	Mark Burdett Racing	HOC; 1; 27	HOC; 2 Ret	HOC; 3; 27	NÜR; 1; 22	NÜR; 2; 29	SIL; 1; 13	SIL; 2; 16	SPA; 1 Ret	SPA; 2; 15	ASS; 1; 20	ASS; 2; 20	MST; 1; 28	MST; 2 DNS	MST; 3 DNS	ZAN; 1 Ret	ZAN; 2; 22	ZAN; 3 C	35th	21

=== Complete ATS Formel 3 Cup results ===
(key) (Races in bold indicate pole position) (Races in italics indicate fastest lap)

Year	Entrant	Chassis	Engine	1	2	3	4	5	6	7	8	9	10	11	12	13	14	15	16	17	18	19	20	21	22	23	24	DC	Points
2014	Lotus	Dallara F309	Volkswagen	OSC; 1; 7	OSC; 2; 7	OSC; 3; 7	LAU1; 1; 5	LAU1; 2; 9	LAU1; 3; 8	RBR; 1; 5	RBR; 2; 8	RBR; 3; 6	HOC1; 1 Ret	HOC1; 2; 5	HOC1; 3; 5	NÜR; 1; 7	NÜR; 2; 10	NÜR; 3; 8	LAU2; 1; 8	LAU2; 2 C	LAU2; 3; 8	SAC; 1; 9	SAC; 2; 9	SAC; 3; 10	HOC2; 1; 5	HOC2; 2; 8	HOC2; 3; 5	7th	117

=== Complete Auto GP results ===
(key) (Races in bold indicate pole position) (Races in italics indicate fastest lap)

Year	Entrant	1	2	3	4	Pos	Points
2015	Zele Racing	HUN; 1; 8	HUN; 2; 9	SIL; 1; 6	SIL; 2; 6	9th‡	20‡

^{‡} Position when season was cancelled.
