= Luis Michael Dörrbecker =

Mexican racing driver

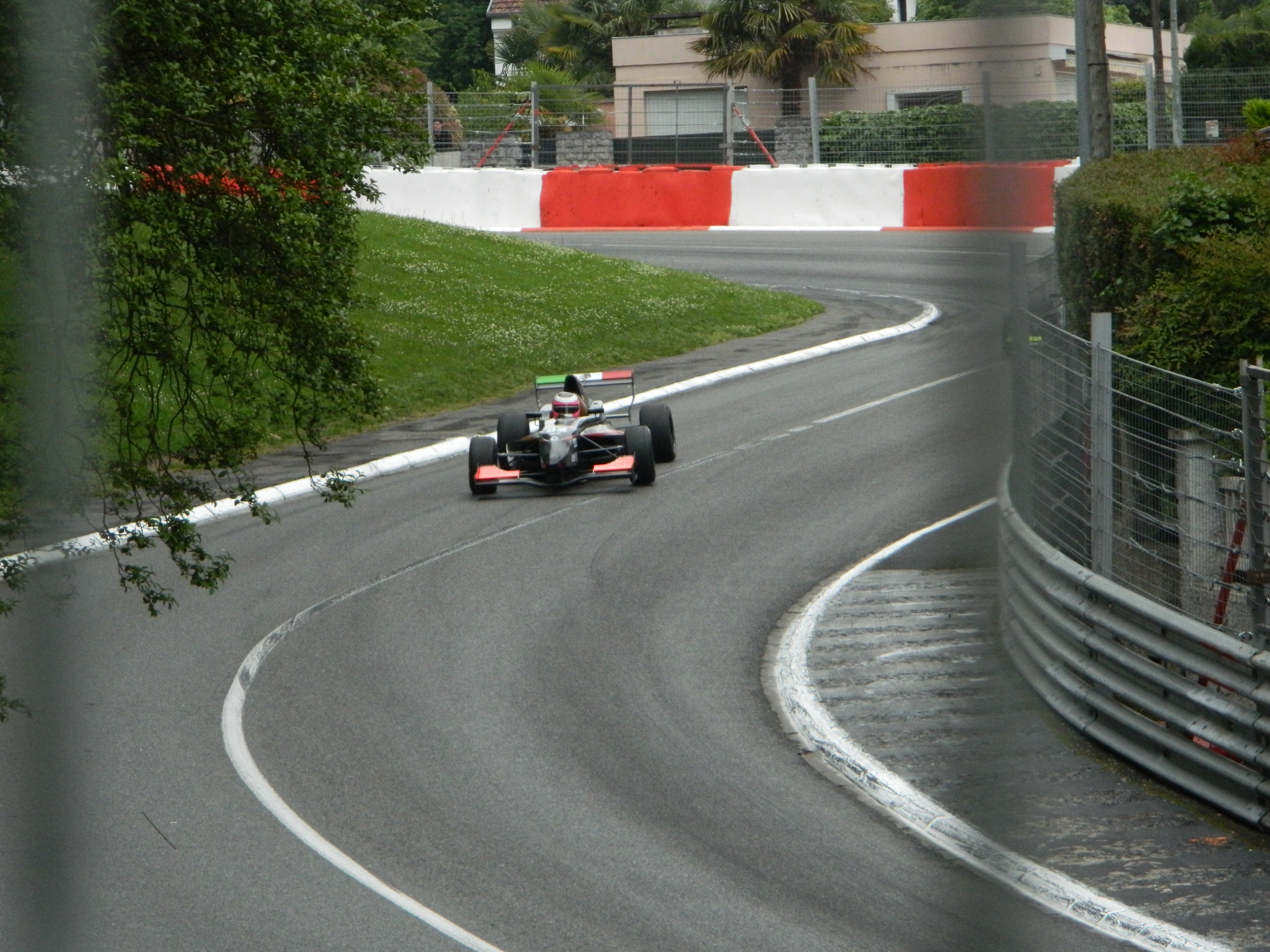
- Dörrbecker at Pau in 2012
- Nationality: (Mexico) Mexican (Germany) German
- Born: Luis Michael Dörrbecker Rebollar; 1 September 1993 (age 33) Gifhorn, Germany

GT World Challenge Europe Endurance Cup career
- Debut season: 2022
- Current team: Vincenzo Sospiri Racing
- Categorisation: FIA Silver
- Car number: 163
- Starts: 4 (4 entries)
- Wins: 0
- Podiums: 0
- Poles: 0
- Fastest laps: 0
- Best finish: 15th (Silver Cup) in 2022

Championship titles
- 2016 2018: Auto GP - Formula Open; NASCAR FedEx Challenge Series

Luis Michael Dörrbecker Rebollar (born 1 September 1993) is a Mexican racing driver who currently competes in the NASCAR Mexico Series and the International GT Open.

== Career ==
Dörrbecker started his racing career in 2003, when he was fifteenth in the Super Karts Cup México. In both 2005 and 2006, he won the championship. Furthermore, in 2007, he won the NACAM Formula Kart Rotax Championship Latin America.

2008 saw Dörrbecker's debut in formula racing, coming fourth in the Formula Vee Mexico. He was then second in the Skip Barber Southern Regional Series, held during the winter. In 2009, he got to the twenty-third position in the LATAM Challenge Series, which used Formula Renault cars. He also entered four races of the Skip Barber National Championship, finishing sixth, eighth, seventh and sixth.

In 2010, Dörrbecker started racing in Europe, when he entered two races in Formula Renault 2.0 Italia. Later that year, he drove six races in the Skip Barber National, winning one of them. In 2011, he finished ninth in the FR 2.0 Italia and in 2012, he drove eight races in the Formula Renault 2.0 Alps, but only scored two points. However, he did test the Indy Lights car at Indianapolis later that year.

Dörrbecker then entered the Formula ACI/CSAI Abarth Italian Championship in 2013, finishing on the podium once and seventh in the championship. In 2014, Dörrbecker raced for Team Mexico in Formula Acceleration 1. After eight races, he placed in the championship.

Dörrbecker entered the first three rounds of the 2015 Euroformula Open Championship, scoring a point. In 2016, he entered the first round of the Auto GP, winning both races. Later he joined the Formula class of the BOSS GP Series also with a Lola B05/52, scoring a win and three overall podiums.

== Racing record ==
=== Racing career summary ===
Season	Series	Team	Races	Wins	Poles	F/Laps	Podiums	Points	Position
2008	Formula VEE Mexico - Novatos	Stammtisch Racing	6	4	?	?	4	225	4th
2008–09	Skip Barber Southern Regional Series	N/A	?	?	?	?	?	304	**2nd**
2009	Skip Barber National	N/A	4	0	0	0	0	0	NC
2009	Latam Challenge Series	Team Costa Rica	2	0	0	0	0	8	23rd
2010	Formula Renault 2.0 Italia	Team Costa Rica / Facondini Racing	2	0	0	0	0	8	25th
2010	Skip Barber National	N/A	6	1	0	0	1	150	10th
2011	Formula Renault 2.0 Italia	Team Costa Rica/Facondini	12	0	0	0	1	103	9th
2011	Turismos de Resistencia - GTT	Stammtisch	1	0	0	0	0	34	18th
2012	Formula Renault 2.0 Alps	Team Torino Motorsport	8	0	0	0	0	2	25th
2013	Formula Abarth	Torino Motorsport	9	0	0	0	1	52	7th
2014	Formula Acceleration 1	Acceleration Team Mexico	10	0	0	0	0	33	9th
2015	Euroformula Open Championship	EmiliodeVillota Motorsport	6	0	0	0	0	1	20th
2016	Auto GP - Formula Open	Torino Squadra Corse	10	7	5	5	10	222	**1st**
2016	BOSS GP Series - Formula Class	Torino Squadra Corse	8	3	0	0	5	169	**2nd**
2017	NASCAR PEAK Challenge - Mexico	FedEx-Telcel	11	1	3	1	4	311	4th
2017	NASCAR PEAK Mexico Series	Dem Racing SA de CV	1	0	0	0	0	32	37th
2018	NASCAR FedEx Challenge Series	FedEx-Telcel	10	5	4	4	5	384	**1st**
2018	NASCAR PEAK Mexico Series	FedEx-Telcel	1	0	0	0	0	0	NC†
2019	NASCAR PEAK Mexico Series	FedEx-Telcel Blu	8	0	2	0	0	0	NC†
2022	GT World Challenge Europe Endurance Cup	Vincenzo Sospiri Racing	4	0	0	0	0	0	NC
2022	GT World Challenge Europe Endurance Cup - Silver	Vincenzo Sospiri Racing	4	0	0	0	0	24	15th
2023	GT World Challenge Europe Endurance Cup	VSR	1	0	0	0	0	0	NC
2025	NASCAR Mexico Series	Codialub							
2025	International GT Open	BDR Competition / BDR Grupo Prom Racing Team	14	0	0	0	0	1	43rd

^{†} As Dörrbecker was a guest driver, he was ineligible to score points.

=== Complete Formula Renault 2.0 Alps Series results ===
(key) (Races in bold indicate pole position; races in italics indicate fastest lap)

Year	Team	1	2	3	4	5	6	7	8	9	10	11	12	13	14	Pos	Points
2012	Team Torino Motorsport	MNZ; 1; 11	MNZ; 2; 19	PAU; 1; 13	PAU; 2; 11	IMO; 1; 21	IMO; 2; 9	SPA; 1; 14	SPA; 2; 16	RBR; 1	RBR; 2	MUG; 1	MUG; 2	CAT; 1	CAT; 2	25th	2

=== Complete GT World Challenge Europe results ===
==== GT World Challenge Europe Endurance Cup ====
(Races in bold indicate pole position) (Races in italics indicate fastest lap)

Year	Team	Car	Class	1	2	3	4	5	6	7	Pos.	Points
2022	Vincenzo Sospiri Racing	Lamborghini Huracán GT3 Evo	Silver	IMO; 26	LEC; 32	SPA; 6H; 37	SPA; 12H; 30	SPA; 24H; 21	HOC; 28	CAT	15th	24
