= 2014 Auto GP Series =

Sports

Seasons
- ← 2013 2015 →

The 2014 Auto GP Series was the fifth year of the Auto GP, and the fifteenth season of the former Euroseries 3000. The championship began on 13 April in Marrakech, Morocco and finished on 19 October at the Autódromo do Estoril, after eight double-header rounds.

Despite missing two rounds during the season, Euronova Racing driver Kimiya Sato was crowned champion, after winning six races over the course of the season. Sato won the championship by 14 points over Tamás Pál Kiss, who was a three-time race winner during the 2014 season. Super Nova International's Markus Pommer completed the championship top three in third position, 27 points in arrears of Pál Kiss, having won races in Marrakech and Monza. Aside from them, other drivers to win races were Andrea Roda at the Red Bull Ring, Kevin Giovesi, who won at Le Castellet and Monza, Shinya Michimi, who won the season's final race at Estoril, while Michela Cerruti became the first woman to win a race in the series, with a victory at Imola. In the teams' championship, Super Nova International fended off Virtuosi UK in a tight title race, with Super Nova prevailing by just six points.

== Teams and drivers ==
Team	No.	Driver	Rounds
(United Kingdom) Super Nova International	1	(Germany) Markus Pommer	All
(United Kingdom) Super Nova International	2	(Angola) Ricardo Teixeira	2
(United Kingdom) Super Nova International	2	(Italy) Francesco Dracone	4–5, 7–8
(United Kingdom) Super Nova International	2	(Italy) Vittorio Ghirelli	3
(United Kingdom) Super Nova International	88	(Italy) Michela Cerruti	1–7
(United Kingdom) Super Nova International	88	(Italy) Vittorio Ghirelli	8
(United Kingdom) Virtuosi UK	4	(Italy) Andrea Roda	All
(United Kingdom) Virtuosi UK	6	(Slovakia) Richard Gonda	1–2
(United Kingdom) Virtuosi UK	11	(Belgium) Sam Dejonghe	1–3
(United Kingdom) Virtuosi UK	11	(Norway) Pål Varhaug	5
(United Kingdom) Virtuosi UK	11	(Hungary) Tamás Pál Kiss	6–8
(Spain) Ibiza Racing	7	(Italy) Giuseppe Cipriani	1–7
(Spain) Ibiza Racing	20	(Italy) Francesco Dracone	1
(Spain) Ibiza Racing	20	(Italy) Niccolò Schirò	2
(Austria) Zele Racing	8	(Italy) Sergio Campana	1
(Austria) Zele Racing	8	(Japan) Yoshitaka Kuroda	2–3
(Austria) Zele Racing	8	(Switzerland) Christof von Grünigen	4–6
(Austria) Zele Racing	8	(Brazil) Antônio Pizzonia	8
(Austria) Zele Racing	9	(Hungary) Tamás Pál Kiss	1–5
(Austria) Zele Racing	9	(Angola) Luís Sá Silva	8
(Austria) Zele Racing	10	(Venezuela) Samin Gómez	4–5
(Italy) Euronova Racing	15	(Japan) Yoshitaka Kuroda	1, 7
(Italy) Euronova Racing	15	(Japan) Shinya Michimi	4, 8
(Italy) Euronova Racing	16	(Japan) Kimiya Sato	1–3, 5–7
(Italy) Euronova Racing	16	(Japan) Yoshitaka Kuroda	4
(Italy) Euronova Racing	77	(Italy) Salvatore de Plano	5
(Italy) Euronova Racing	77	(Japan) Shinya Michimi	6
(Italy) / Eurotech Engineering; (Italy) / FMS Racing	28	(Italy) Kevin Giovesi	All
(Italy) / Eurotech Engineering; (Italy) / FMS Racing	69	(Italy) Loris Spinelli	1–5
(Italy) / Eurotech Engineering; (Italy) / FMS Racing	99	(Italy) Vittorio Ghirelli	5
(Italy) / Eurotech Engineering; (Italy) / FMS Racing	99	(Italy) Salvatore de Plano	6–8
(Italy) MLR 71 by Euronova	71	(Italy) Michele La Rosa	All

== Race calendar and results ==
The provisional calendar for the 2014 season was released on 26 January 2014, with the series' definitive calendar released on 8 March 2014.

Round		Circuit	Date	Pole position	Fastest lap	Winning driver	Winning team	Supporting
1	R1	(Morocco) Marrakech Street Circuit	12 April	(Italy) Kevin Giovesi	(Germany) Markus Pommer	(Japan) Kimiya Sato	(Italy) Euronova Racing	FIA WTCC Race of Morocco
1	R2	(Morocco) Marrakech Street Circuit	13 April		(Germany) Markus Pommer	(Germany) Markus Pommer	(United Kingdom) Super Nova International	FIA WTCC Race of Morocco
2	R3	(France) Circuit Paul Ricard, Le Castellet	19 April	(Italy) Kevin Giovesi	(Japan) Kimiya Sato	(Hungary) Tamás Pál Kiss	(Austria) Zele Racing	FIA WTCC Race of France
2	R4	(France) Circuit Paul Ricard, Le Castellet	20 April		(Germany) Markus Pommer	(Italy) Kevin Giovesi	(Italy) Eurotech Engineering	FIA WTCC Race of France
3	R5	(Hungary) Hungaroring	3 May	(Germany) Markus Pommer	(Hungary) Tamás Pál Kiss	(Japan) Kimiya Sato	(Italy) Euronova Racing	FIA WTCC Race of Hungary
3	R6	(Hungary) Hungaroring	4 May		(Japan) Kimiya Sato	(Japan) Kimiya Sato	(Italy) Euronova Racing	FIA WTCC Race of Hungary
4	R7	(Italy) Autodromo Nazionale Monza	31 May	(Germany) Markus Pommer	(Japan) Shinya Michimi	(Germany) Markus Pommer	(United Kingdom) Super Nova International	Italian GT Championship
4	R8	(Italy) Autodromo Nazionale Monza	1 June		(Germany) Markus Pommer	(Italy) Kevin Giovesi	(Italy) Eurotech Engineering	Italian GT Championship
5	R9	(Italy) Autodromo Enzo e Dino Ferrari	28 June	(Germany) Markus Pommer	(Japan) Kimiya Sato	(Japan) Kimiya Sato	(Italy) Euronova Racing	ACI Racing Weekend
5	R10	(Italy) Autodromo Enzo e Dino Ferrari	29 June		(Japan) Kimiya Sato	(Italy) Michela Cerruti	(United Kingdom) Super Nova International	ACI Racing Weekend
6	R11	(Austria) Red Bull Ring	20 July	(Japan) Kimiya Sato	(Japan) Kimiya Sato	(Japan) Kimiya Sato	(Italy) Euronova Racing	4 Hours of Red Bull Ring
6	R12	(Austria) Red Bull Ring	20 July		(Japan) Shinya Michimi	(Italy) Andrea Roda	(United Kingdom) Virtuosi UK	4 Hours of Red Bull Ring
7	R13	(Germany) Nürburgring	16 August	(Germany) Markus Pommer	(Japan) Kimiya Sato	(Japan) Kimiya Sato	(Italy) Euronova Racing	Deutsche Tourenwagen Masters
7	R14	(Germany) Nürburgring	17 August		(Japan) Kimiya Sato	(Hungary) Tamás Pál Kiss	(United Kingdom) Virtuosi UK	Deutsche Tourenwagen Masters
8	R15	(Portugal) Autódromo do Estoril	19 October	(Hungary) Tamás Pál Kiss	(Brazil) Antônio Pizzonia	(Hungary) Tamás Pál Kiss	(United Kingdom) Virtuosi UK	4 Hours of Estoril
8	R16	(Portugal) Autódromo do Estoril	19 October		(Japan) Shinya Michimi	(Japan) Shinya Michimi	(Italy) Euronova Racing	4 Hours of Estoril

== Championship standings ==
- Points for both championships were awarded as follows:

Race
Position	1st	2nd	3rd	4th	5th	6th	7th	8th	9th	10th
**Race One**	25	18	15	12	10	8	6	4	2	1
**Race Two**	20	15	12	10	8	6	4	3	2	1

In addition:

- Two points were awarded for Pole position for Race One
- One point were awarded for fastest lap in each race

=== Drivers' championship ===
Pos	Driver	MAR (Morocco)		LEC (France)		HUN (Hungary)		MNZ (Italy)		IMO (Italy)		RBR (Austria)		NÜR (Germany)		EST (Portugal)		Points
1	(Japan) Kimiya Sato	1	2	3	3	1	1			1	4	**1**	8†	1	3			221
2	(Hungary) Tamás Pál Kiss	Ret	3	1	2	2	7	2	5	9	9	2	2	4	1	**1**	4	207
3	(Germany) Markus Pommer	8	1	2	4	**9**	6	**1**	3	**Ret**	5	5	Ret	**3**	2	3	5	180
4	(Italy) Andrea Roda	7†	4	5	7	3	5	4	2	3	8	3	1	5	4	5	8	166
5	(Italy) Kevin Giovesi	**Ret**	Ret	**4**	1	4	4	8	1	2	2	4	7†	2	6	WD	WD	155
6	(Italy) Michela Cerruti	4	5	7	5	10	10	3	7	5	1	Ret	3	6	5			113
7	(Italy) Michele La Rosa	2	6	9	9	7	9	5	Ret	12†	11	8	5	9	8	8	6	73
8	(Japan) Shinya Michimi							11†	6			6	4			6	1	55
9	(Italy) Vittorio Ghirelli					8	2			10	6					2	Ret	44
10	(Belgium) Sam Dejonghe	5	8†	Ret	6	5	3											41
11	(Italy) Giuseppe Cipriani	3	7	10	10	12†	Ret	7	8	8	Ret	9	Ret	Ret	9			38
12	(Japan) Yoshitaka Kuroda	WD	WD	8	8	6	11	10	4					7	7			36
13	(Italy) Francesco Dracone	9†	9†					6	10	6	10			8	10	Ret	7	31
14	(Brazil) Antônio Pizzonia															4	3	25
15	(Norway) Pål Varhaug									4	3							24
16	(Angola) Luís Sá Silva															7	2	21
17	(Italy) Loris Spinelli	6	Ret	6	Ret	11	8	Ret	11	WD	WD							19
18	(Switzerland) Christof von Grünigen							Ret	9	7	7	7	Ret					18
19	(Italy) Salvatore de Plano									11	12	10	6	Ret	11	9	9	11
20	(Venezuela) Samin Gómez							9	Ret	WD	WD							2
21	(Italy) Sergio Campana	10†	Ret															1
22	(Slovakia) Richard Gonda	11†	Ret	WD	WD													0
	(Italy) Niccolò Schirò			Ret	Ret													0
	(Angola) Ricardo Teixeira			WD	WD													0
Pos	Driver	MAR (Morocco)		LEC (France)		HUN (Hungary)		MNZ (Italy)		IMO (Italy)		RBR (Austria)		NÜR (Germany)		EST (Portugal)		Points

Colour	Result
Gold	Winner
Silver	Second place
Bronze	Third place
Green	Points classification
Blue	Non-points classification
Blue	Non-classified finish (NC)
Purple	Retired, not classified (Ret)
Red	Did not qualify (DNQ)
Red	Did not pre-qualify (DNPQ)
Black	Disqualified (DSQ)
White	Did not start (DNS)
White	Withdrew (WD)
White	Race cancelled (C)
Blank	Did not practice (DNP)
Blank	Did not arrive (DNA)
Blank	Excluded (EX)

**Bold** – Pole for Race One
Italics – Fastest Lap

=== Teams' championship ===
Pos	Team	MAR (Morocco)		LEC (France)		HUN (Hungary)		MNZ (Italy)		IMO (Italy)		RBR (Austria)		NÜR (Germany)		EST (Portugal)		Points
1	(United Kingdom) Super Nova International	4	1	2	4	8	2	**1**	3	5	1	5	3	**3**	2	3	5	339
1	(United Kingdom) Super Nova International	8	5	7	5	**9**	6	3	7	6	5	Ret	Ret	8	5	2	7	339
2	(United Kingdom) Virtuosi UK	5	4	5	6	3	3	4	2	3	3	2	1	4	1	**1**	4	333
2	(United Kingdom) Virtuosi UK	7	8	Ret	7	5	5			4	8	3	2	5	4	5	8	333
3	(Italy) Euronova Racing	1	2	3	3	1	1	10	4	1	4	**1**	4	1	3	6	1	297
3	(Italy) Euronova Racing	WD	WD					11†	6	11	12	6	8†	7	7			297
4	(Italy) Eurotech Engineering (Italy) FMS Racing	6	Ret	**4**	1	4	4	8	1	2	2	4	6	2	6	9	9	190
4	(Italy) Eurotech Engineering (Italy) FMS Racing	**Ret**	Ret	6	Ret	11	8	Ret	11	10	6	10	7†	Ret	Ret	WD	WD	190
5	(Austria) Zele Racing	10†	3	1	2	2	6	2	5	7	7	7	Ret			4	2	187
5	(Austria) Zele Racing	Ret	Ret	8	8	7	11	9	9	9	9					7	3	187
6	(Italy) MLR 71 by Euronova	2	6	9	9	7	9	5	Ret	12†	11	8	5	9	8	8	6	73
7	(Spain) Ibiza Racing	3	7	10	10	12	Ret	7	8	8	Ret	9	Ret	Ret	9			42
7	(Spain) Ibiza Racing	9†	9†	Ret	Ret													42
Pos	Team	MAR (Morocco)		LEC (France)		HUN (Hungary)		MNZ (Italy)		IMO (Italy)		RBR (Austria)		NÜR (Germany)		EST (Portugal)		Points

Colour	Result
Gold	Winner
Silver	Second place
Bronze	Third place
Green	Points classification
Blue	Non-points classification
Blue	Non-classified finish (NC)
Purple	Retired, not classified (Ret)
Red	Did not qualify (DNQ)
Red	Did not pre-qualify (DNPQ)
Black	Disqualified (DSQ)
White	Did not start (DNS)
White	Withdrew (WD)
White	Race cancelled (C)
Blank	Did not practice (DNP)
Blank	Did not arrive (DNA)
Blank	Excluded (EX)

**Bold** – Pole for Race One
Italics – Fastest Lap
