= SC Corinthians Paulista (Superleague Formula team) =

Superleague Formula team

SC Corinthians SF Racing Team
Founded	2008
Country	Brazil
Driver(s)	Andy Soucek (2008); Antônio Pizzonia ('08, '09); Robert Doornbos (2010)
First race	2008 Donington
Last race	2010 Navarra
Rounds	24
Ch'ships	0
Total points	891 (including Super Finals)
2010 position	12th (363 pts)
Races / Poles / Wins / Podiums / F. Laps; 46 / 3 / 0 / 5 / 5
NOTE - Data not including Super Finals

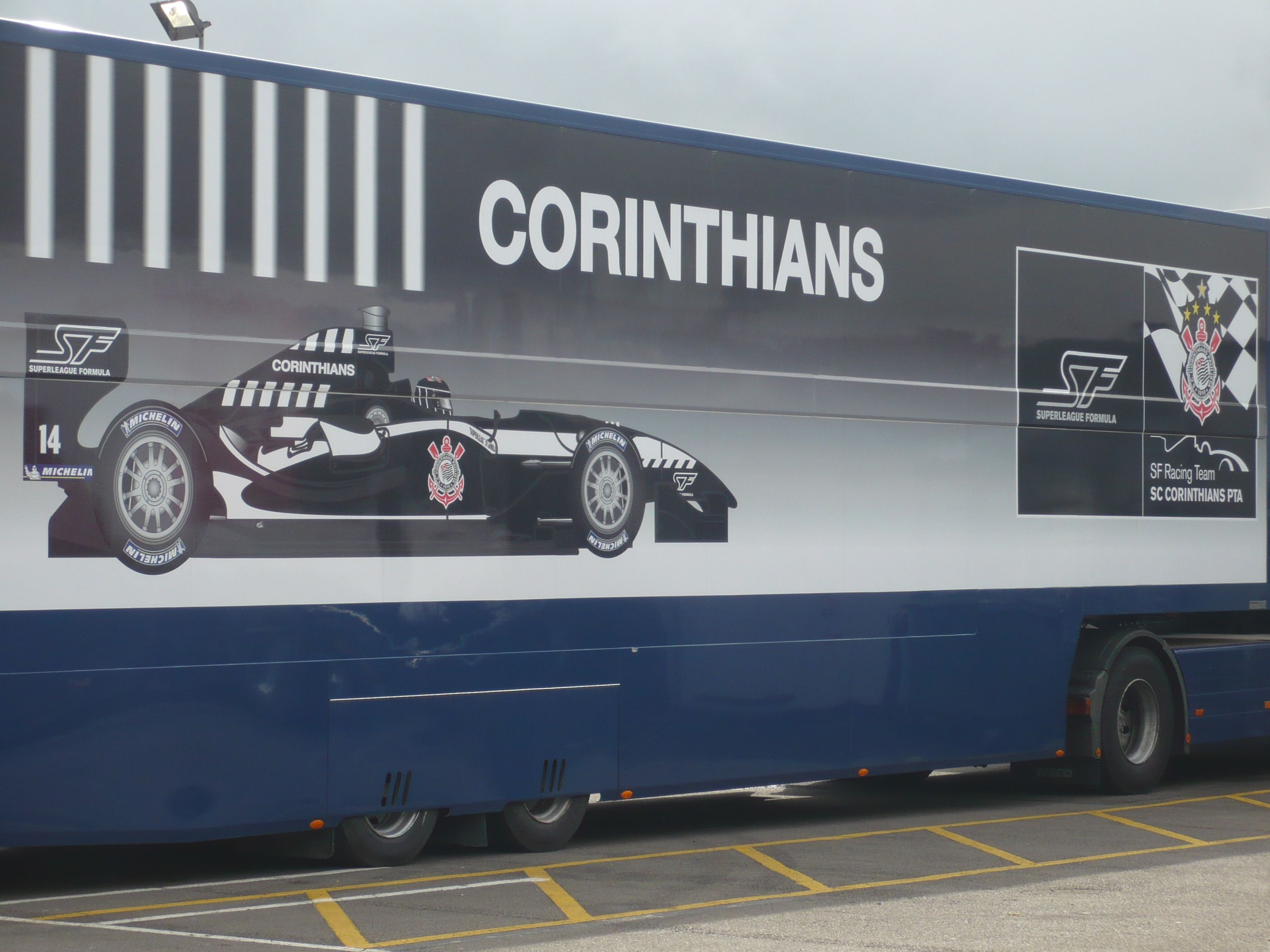
The Corinthians team truck in Silverstone Circuit's paddock (2010)

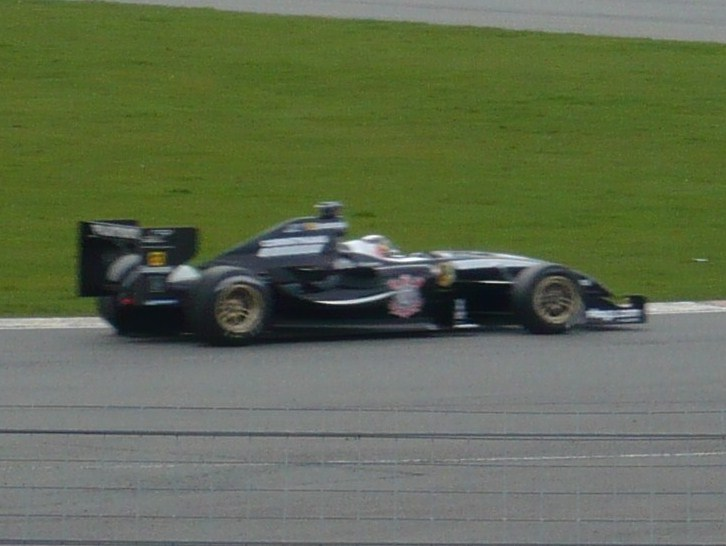
SC Corinthians car on track at Silverstone Circuit (2010)

Sport Club Corinthians Paulista Superleague Formula team is the racing team of Sport Club Corinthians Paulista, a football team that competes in Brazil in the Série A. The Corinthians racing team competes in the Superleague Formula. It was operated by EuroInternational during the first season, and it will be operated by Alan Docking Racing during the second season.

== 2008 season ==
In the 2008 Superleague Formula season Corinthians finished overall in the 9th position. The car was drove in the first two round by Andy Soucek, and in the rest of the season by Antônio Pizzonia.

== 2009 season ==
For the 2009 Superleague Formula season, Antônio Pizzonia has been confirmed as the driver.

== Record ==
(key)

=== 2008 ===
Operator(s)	Driver(s)	1		2		3		4		5		6		Points	Rank
Operator(s)	Driver(s)	DON		NÜR		ZOL		EST		VAL		JER		Points	Rank
EuroInternational	(Spain) Andy Soucek	11	12											264	9th
EuroInternational	(Brazil) Antônio Pizzonia			7	10	10	18	4	4	6	16	12	2	264	9th

=== 2009 ===
- Super Final results in 2009 did not count for points towards the main championship.

Operator(s)	Driver(s)	1			2			3			4			5			6			Points	Rank
Operator(s)	Driver(s)	MAG			ZOL			DON			EST			MOZ			JAR			Points	Rank
Alan Docking Racing	(Brazil) Antônio Pizzonia	4	9	3	17	12	–	3	8	4	3	5	5	10	9	–	14	18	X	264	8th

=== 2010 ===
Operator(s)	Driver(s)	1			2			3			4			5			6			7			8			9			10			NC			11			Points	Rank
Operator(s)	Driver(s)	SIL			ASS			MAG			JAR			NÜR			ZOL			BRH			ADR			POR			ORD			BEI			NAV			Points	Rank
Azerti Motorsport	(Netherlands) Robert Doornbos	11	7	X	9	15	X	12	16	X	9	5	X	7	10	X	3	16	X	15	18	X	8	6	X	6	3	5	18	15	X	DN	DN	C	9	15	X	363	12th

== See also ==
- SC Corinthians Paulista
- SC Corinthians Paulista (women)
- SC Corinthians Paulista (futsal)
- SC Corinthians Paulista (beach soccer)
- SC Corinthians Paulista (basketball)
- Corinthians Steamrollers (american football)
