= 2015 Auto GP Series =

Seasons
- ← 2014 2016 →

The 2015 Auto GP Series was the sixth year of Auto GP, and the sixteenth season of the former Euroseries 3000. The championship began on 2 May at the Hungaroring and was scheduled to finish after six double-header rounds at the Circuit de Barcelona-Catalunya, on 4 October.

To guarantee a field of at least 18 cars each race, the Auto GP Organisation, led by Enzo Coloni, announced a cooperation deal with ISRA, the Dutch company led by Henk de Jong that organised the 2014 Formula Acceleration 1 season. However, the partnership between the Auto GP Organisation and ISRA was discontinued as Auto GP prepared for round one, due to ISRA's apparent lack of commitment. It was also announced that the 2015 Auto GP champion will be given a Formula One test. This attempt to extend the season did not succeed however. On 26 June, the day before the third meeting at Paul Ricard, the season was postponed because of a lack of grid numbers.

In October 2015, the season was "archived" after four of the scheduled six events had been cancelled due to a lack of entries. Antônio Pizzonia had been leading the drivers' championship by eleven points, after winning two of the first four races. Second place was held by Facu Regalia, who won the season-opening race at Silverstone, while the only other race-winner Luís Sá Silva, was lying third in the championship, another 15 points in arrears. With the victories of Pizzonia and Sá Silva, Zele Racing held the lead of the teams' championship with 132 points, 37 points ahead of the second-placed team, FMS Racing. However, due to the series cancellation, no championship titles were awarded.

== Teams and drivers ==
Team	No.	Driver	Rounds
(United Kingdom) Virtuosi UK	5	(Venezuela) Johnny Cecotto Jr.	1
(United Kingdom) Virtuosi UK	72	(Russia) Nikita Zlobin	All
(Italy) Paolo Coloni Racing	6	(Switzerland) Christof von Grünigen	All
(Italy) Paolo Coloni Racing	69	(Italy) Loris Spinelli	2
(Spain) Ibiza Racing Team	7	(Italy) Giuseppe Cipriani	All
(Austria) Zele Racing	8	(Brazil) Antônio Pizzonia	All
(Austria) Zele Racing	9	(Colombia) Andrés Méndez	All
(Austria) Zele Racing	10	(Angola) Luís Sá Silva	All
(Italy) FMS Racing	16	(Italy) Leonardo Pulcini	1
(Italy) FMS Racing	23	(Argentina) Facu Regalia	All

== Race calendar and results ==
The latest draft for the 2015 season was released on 22 December 2014. On 1 April 2015 it was announced that the Marrakech round had been cancelled.

Round		Circuit	Date	Pole position	Fastest lap	Winning driver	Winning team	Supporting
1	R1	(Hungary) Hungaroring	2 May	(Brazil) Antônio Pizzonia	(Argentina) Facu Regalia	(Argentina) Facu Regalia	(Italy) FMS Racing	FIA WTCC Race of Hungary
1	R2	(Hungary) Hungaroring	3 May		(Brazil) Antônio Pizzonia	(Brazil) Antônio Pizzonia	(Austria) Zele Racing	FIA WTCC Race of Hungary
2	R3	(United Kingdom) Silverstone Circuit	23 May	(Argentina) Facu Regalia	(Brazil) Antônio Pizzonia	(Brazil) Antônio Pizzonia	(Austria) Zele Racing	Blancpain Endurance Series
2	R4	(United Kingdom) Silverstone Circuit	24 May		(Argentina) Facu Regalia	(Angola) Luís Sá Silva	(Austria) Zele Racing	Blancpain Endurance Series
–	–	(France) Circuit Paul Ricard, Le Castellet	27 June	Cancelled due to lack of entries				FIA WTCC Race of France
–	–	(France) Circuit Paul Ricard, Le Castellet	28 June	Cancelled due to lack of entries				FIA WTCC Race of France
–	–	(Netherlands) Circuit Park Zandvoort	11 July	Cancelled due to lack of entries				Deutsche Tourenwagen Masters
–	–	(Netherlands) Circuit Park Zandvoort	12 July	Cancelled due to lack of entries				Deutsche Tourenwagen Masters
–	–	(Czech Republic) Masaryk Circuit, Brno	5 September	Cancelled due to lack of entries				European Touring Car Cup
–	–	(Czech Republic) Masaryk Circuit, Brno	6 September	Cancelled due to lack of entries				European Touring Car Cup
–	–	(Spain) Circuit de Barcelona-Catalunya	3 October	Cancelled due to lack of entries				
–	–	(Spain) Circuit de Barcelona-Catalunya	4 October	Cancelled due to lack of entries				

== Championship standings ==
=== Drivers' championship ===
- Points were awarded as follows:

R	1	2	3	4	5	6	7	8	9	10	PP	FL
R1	25	18	15	12	10	8	6	4	2	1	**2**	1
R2	20	15	12	10	8	6	4	3	2	1	**0**	1

Pos	Driver	HUN (Hungary)		SIL (United Kingdom)		Pts
1	(Brazil) Antônio Pizzonia	**2**	1	1	3	79
2	(Argentina) Facu Regalia	1	6	**2**	2	68
3	(Angola) Luís Sá Silva	6	4	3	1	53
4	(Russia) Nikita Zlobin	7	5	4	7	30
5	(Italy) Leonardo Pulcini	4	2			27
6	(Switzerland) Christof von Grünigen	3	8	DNS	5	26
7	(Italy) Giuseppe Cipriani	Ret	7	5	4	24
8	(Venezuela) Johnny Cecotto Jr.	5	3			22
9	(Colombia) Andrés Méndez	8	9	6	6	20
—	(Italy) Loris Spinelli			WD	WD	0
Pos	Driver	HUN (Hungary)		SIL (United Kingdom)		Pts

Colour	Result
Gold	Winner
Silver	Second place
Bronze	Third place
Green	Points classification
Blue	Non-points classification
Blue	Non-classified finish (NC)
Purple	Retired, not classified (Ret)
Red	Did not qualify (DNQ)
Red	Did not pre-qualify (DNPQ)
Black	Disqualified (DSQ)
White	Did not start (DNS)
White	Withdrew (WD)
White	Race cancelled (C)
Blank	Did not practice (DNP)
Blank	Did not arrive (DNA)
Blank	Excluded (EX)

**Bold** – Pole
Italics – Fastest Lap

=== Teams' championship ===
Pos	Team	HUN (Hungary)		SIL (United Kingdom)		Pts
1	(Austria) Zele Racing	**2**	1	1	1	132
1	(Austria) Zele Racing	6	4	3	3	132
2	(Italy) FMS Racing	1	2	**2**	2	95
2	(Italy) FMS Racing	4	6			95
3	(United Kingdom) Virtuosi UK	5	3	4	7	52
3	(United Kingdom) Virtuosi UK	7	5			52
4	(Italy) Paolo Coloni Racing	3	8	DNS	5	26
4	(Italy) Paolo Coloni Racing			WD	WD	26
5	(Spain) Ibiza Racing Team	Ret	7	5	4	24
Pos	Team	HUN (Hungary)		SIL (United Kingdom)		Pts
