= Zele Racing =

Austrian auto racing team

(Austria) Zele Racing
- Founded: 2001
- Founder(s): Hermann Zele; Michael Zele
- Base: Bleiburg, Austria
- Team principal(s): Michael Zele
- Current series: BOSS GP
- Former series: Porsche Carrera Cup Germany; TCR International Series; Auto GP; World Series by Nissan
- Current drivers: Harald Schlegelmilch
- Teams' Championships: Auto GP (2015)
- Drivers' Championships: Auto GP (2015)
- Website: http://www.zele-racing.com/

Zele Racing is an Austrian motor racing team currently competing in the BOSS GP series via a partnership with HS Engineering. The team has raced in Auto GP claiming the series' final stand-alone championship in 2015, along with having previously supported Super Formula teams Nakajima Racing and B-Max Racing, and B-Quik Absolute Racing in the Thailand Super Series.

== History ==
=== Early history ===
The team was founded by father and son duo Hermann and Michael Zele to compete in the regional Interserie. The team ran Formula Opel Lotus cars for Peter Milavec and Christoph Hingartner finishing first and second in the championship standings.

The team made its professional racing debut in the 2002 World Series by Nissan season. Argentine racer Nicolás Filiberti scored the best results for the team. Filiberti's best result was a fourth place at Circuito del Jarama and he ended twelfth in the series championship. Receiving sponsorship from Austrian asset management firm Superfund Group the team returned to the series in 2003. The team scored mixed results with one podium finish for Norbert Siedler. Siedler finished fifteenth in the series standings as the best Zele Racing driver. Christiano Rocha scored podium finishes in the Euro Formula 3000 series, the later Auto GP, in 2004.

Zele Racing was in charge of developing the stillborn Formula Superfund series. The series was intended to start for the 2005 season racing the Force 10 SF01 car replacing the Italian Formula 3000 championship. Patrick Lemarié tested the car at Estoril. Lemarié had a heavy crash and the series was therefore suspended indefinitely.

Between 2007 and 2012 the team focused on the Interserie, EuroBOSS and BOSS GP series. In 2010 the team won the final season of the original EuroBOSS series. The team's drivers Damien Charveriat and Andreas Zuber each won two races of the season that was canceled after four races. The drivers ran Dallara GP2/05 chassis, previously used in the GP2 Series until 2008.

=== Motopark Academy ===
Zele Racing and Motopark Academy entered a partnership for the 2008 Formula Renault 2.0 Northern European Cup and the 2008 Eurocup Formula Renault 2.0. Michael Zele supported Motopark Academy with race engineering services. In the Northern European Cup Motopark Academy drivers Valtteri Bottas and António Félix da Costa finished first and second in the championship standings. The Eurocup drivers were less successful.

=== Epsilon Euskadi ===
Michael Zele was the race engineer for Stéphane Richelmi in the 2009 British Formula Three Championship racing with Barazi-Epsilon. Richelmis best result were two twelfth-place finishes. Zele also supported the team at the 2009 1000 km of Spa, the second round of the 2009 Le Mans Series. The team finished the race fourth in the LMP2 class with their Zytek 07S/2. However the car did not comply with technical regulations and was disqualified.

=== Auto GP ===
The Austrian racing team returned to the professional racing circuit in 2012 entering the Auto GP series. During their inaugural, 2012, season the team entered seven different drivers over their two cars. Giacomo Ricci and Sergio Campana scored the best results for the team, both with a third-place finish. Ricci scored the podium finish at Marrakech while Campana scored his podium finish at Sonoma.

In 2013 the team started the season with reigning FIA Formula Two champion Luciano Bacheta and former Formula 1 driver Narain Karthikeyan. Bacheta delivered the first race win, at Marrakech. Karthikeyan left the team after the Hungarian round. Karthikeyan felt frustrated with mistakes by the team during pitstops and technical preparation. Bacheta left the team after four rounds to focus on a possible GP2 Series move. Christian Klien replaced Bacheta for Mugello, along with Tamás Pál Kiss. The team did not race until the final round at Brno.

Tamás Pál Kiss remained for the majority of the 2014 season, winning at Paul Ricard. At Imola Kiss came in for a pit stop without the team knowing, this cost the Hungarian valuable points. After the difficult Imola weekend Kiss did not return with the team. The team stated financial difficulties as the reason for his absence.

The creation of the Formula Acceleration 1, which uses the same car as the Auto GP, caused both racing grids to shrink. This continued for the 2015 Auto GP season. At the start of the season the two championships had the intention to merge, but this did not come to fruition. The 2015 season opener fielded only eight cars, three of which were entered by Zele Racing. With only seven cars at the second round of the championship, the remainder of the season was canceled. Antônio Pizzonia had the best results and was unofficially crowned champion. The series was revived for 2016, but again with very small grids. After the first round of the season the championship merged with BOSS GP.

== Motorsports results ==
=== Complete World Series by Nissan results ===
(key) (Races in bold indicate pole position) (Races in italics indicate fastest lap)

Year	No.	Drivers	1	2	3	4	5	6	7	8	9	10	11	12	13	14	15	16	17	18	Pos	Points
2002	18	(Argentina) Nicolás Filiberti	VAL; 1; 5	VAL; 2; 7	JAR; 1 DNS	JAR; 2; 4	ALB; 1 Ret	ALB; 2; 8	MON; 1; 8	MON; 2; 7	MAG; 1 Ret	MAG; 2; 16	BAR; 1; 18	BAR; 2; 12			CUR; 1; 12	CUR; 2; 12	INT; 1	INT; 2	12th	32
2002	18	(Republic of Ireland) Damien Faulkner													VAL; 1; 13	VAL; 2; 9					26th	2
2002	19	(Republic of Ireland) Damien Faulkner	VAL; 1; 11	VAL; 2; 12	JAR; 1; 17	JAR; 2 Ret															26th	2
2002	19	(Italy) Ivan Bellarosa					ALB; 1; 12	ALB; 2; 13	MNZ; 1 Ret	MNZ; 2; 13											27th	0
2002	19	(Austria) Walter Lechner Jr									MAG; 1; 15	MAG; 2; 8									24th	3
2002	19	(Spain) Rafael Sarandeses											BAR; 1 Ret	BAR; 2 Ret	VAL; 1; 10	VAL; 2 Ret					16th	17
2002	19	(Brazil) Jaime Melo															CUR; 1; 15	CUR; 2; 10	INT; 1; 5	INT; 2 Ret	20th	9
2003	14	(Austria) Norbert Siedler	JAR; 1 Ret	JAR; 2 Ret	ZOL; 1; 3	ZOL; 2; 6	MAG; 1; 12	MAG; 2 Ret	MNZ; 1 Ret	MNZ; 2 Ret	LAU; 1; 19	LAU; 2; 17	A1R; 1; 6	A1R; 2; 10	BAR; 1	BAR; 2					15th	25
2003	14	(United Kingdom) Guy Smith															VAL; 1 DNS	VAL; 2 DNS	JAR; 1	JAR; 2	NC	-
2003	15	(Brazil) Christiano Rocha	JAR; 1 Ret	JAR; 2 Ret	ZOL; 1; 9	ZOL; 2; 9	MAG; 1 Ret	MAG; 2; 9	MNZ; 1; 6	MNZ; 2 Ret	LAU; 1; 14	LAU; 2 Ret	A1R; 1	A1R; 2	BAR; 1	BAR; 2	VAL; 1	VAL; 2	JAR; 1	JAR; 2	17th	12

=== Complete Italian F3000/Auto GP results ===
(key) (Races in bold indicate pole position) (Races in italics indicate fastest lap)

Year	No.	Drivers	1	2	3	4	5	6	7	8	9	10	11	12	13	14	15	16	Pos	Points
2004	18	(Brazil) Christiano Rocha	BRN; 6	EST; Ret	JER; Ret	MNZ; 2	SPA; DNS	DON; 3	DIJ	ZOL; 3	NÜR	NÜR							8th	15
2004	19	(Germany) Sven Heidfeld	BRN; 8	EST; Ret	JER	MNZ	SPA	DON	DIJ	ZOL	NÜR	NÜR							17th	0
2012	8	(Italy) Giacomo Ricci	MNZ; 1; 6	MNZ; 2; 14			MAR; 1; 5	MAR; 2; 3											11th	40
2012	8	(Italy) Matteo Beretta			VAL; 1; 17	VAL; 2; 13													24th	0
2012	8	(Estonia) Sten Pentus							HUN; 1; 9	HUN; 2; 4	ALG; 1; 14	ALG; 2 Ret	CUR; 1	CUR; 2					15th	14
2012	8	(Italy) Sergio Campana													SON; 1; 4	SON; 2; 3			6th	90
2012	9	(Austria) Peter Milavec	MNZ; 1	MNZ; 2	VAL; 1; 15	VAL; 2; 16	MAR; 1	MAR; 2	HUN; 1	HUN; 2									25th	0
2012	9	(Mexico) Juan Carlos Sistos									ALG; 1; 9	ALG; 2 Ret	CUR; 1	CUR; 2					23rd	2
2012	9	(Brazil) Antônio Pizzonia													SON; 1 Ret	SON; 2; 12			9th	45
2013	8	(United Kingdom) Luciano Bacheta	MNZ; 1; 8	MNZ; 2; 2	MAR; 1; 8	MAR; 2; 1	HUN; 1; 16	HUN; 2; 9	SIL; 1; 10	SIL; 2; 8									11th	49
2013	8	(Austria) Christian Klien									MUG; 1; 8	MUG; 2; 9	NÜR; 1	NÜR; 2	DON; 1	DON; 2			18th	6
2013	8	(Czech Republic) Josef Král															BRN; 2; 15	BRN; 2; 12	23rd	0
2013	9	(India) Narain Karthikeyan	MNZ; 1; 5	MNZ; 2 Ret	MAR; 1; 6	MAR; 2 Ret	HUN; 1; 8	HUN; 2; 4											11th	49
2013	9	(Hungary) Tamás Pál Kiss							SIL; 1; 3	SIL; 2; 7	MUG; 1; 5	MUG; 2; 4	NÜR; 1	NÜR; 2	DON; 1	DON; 2	BRN; 2; 5	BRN; 2; 5	5th	99
2014	8	(Italy) Sergio Campana	MAR; 1; 10	MAR; 2 Ret															21st	1
2014	8	(Japan) Yoshitaka Kuroda			LEC; 1; 8	LEC; 2; 9	HUN; 1; 6	HUN; 2; 11											12th	36
2014	8	(Switzerland) Christof von Grünigen							MNZ; 1 Ret	MNZ; 2; 9	IMO; 1; 7	IMO; 2; 7	RBR; 1; 7	RBR; 2 Ret	NÜR; 1	NÜR; 2			18th	18
2014	8	(Brazil) Antônio Pizzonia															EST; 1; 4	EST; 2; 3	14th	25
2014	9	(Hungary) Tamás Pál Kiss	MAR; 1 Ret	MAR; 2; 3	LEC; 1; 1	LEC; 2; 2	HUN; 1; 2	HUN; 2; 7	MNZ; 1; 2	MNZ; 2; 5	IMO; 1; 9	IMO; 2; 9	RBR; 1	RBR; 2	NÜR; 1	NÜR; 2			2nd	207
2014	9	(Angola) Luís Sá Silva															EST; 1; 7	EST; 2; 2	16th	21
2014	10	(Venezuela) Samin Gómez	MAR; 1	MAR; 2	LEC; 1	LEC; 2	HUN; 1	HUN; 2	MNZ; 1; 9	MNZ; 2 Ret	IMO; 1 WD	IMO; 2 WD	RBR; 1	RBR; 2	NÜR; 1	NÜR; 2	EST; 1	EST; 2	20th	1
2015	8	(Brazil) Antônio Pizzonia	**HUN**; **1**; 2	HUN; 2; 1	SIL; 1; 1	SIL; 2; 3	LEC; 1 C	LEC; 2 C	ZAN; 1 C	ZAN; 2 C	BRN; 1 C	BRN; 2 C	BAR; 1 C	BAR; 2 C					1st	79
2015	9	(Colombia) Andrés Méndez	HUN; 1; 8	HUN; 2; 9	SIL; 1; 6	SIL; 2; 6	LEC; 1 C	LEC; 2 C	ZAN; 1 C	ZAN; 2 C	BRN; 1 C	BRN; 2 C	BAR; 1 C	BAR; 2 C					9th	20
2015	10	(Angola) Luís Sá Silva	HUN; 1; 6	HUN; 2; 4	SIL; 1; 3	SIL; 2; 1	LEC; 1 C	LEC; 2 C	ZAN; 1 C	ZAN; 2 C	BRN; 1 C	BRN; 2 C	BAR; 1 C	BAR; 2 C					3rd	53
2016	7	(Angola) Luís Sá Silva	ADR; 1; 5	ADR; 2; 2	MNZ; 1	MNZ; 2	ASS; 1	ASS; 2	BRN; 1	BRN; 2	IMO; 1	IMO; 2							6th	29
2016	8	(Hungary) Dominik Fekete	ADR; 1; 3	ADR; 2; 5	MNZ; 1	MNZ; 2	ASS; 1	ASS; 2	BRN; 1	BRN; 2	IMO; 1	IMO; 2							7th	25
2016	9	(Hungary) Zoltan Fekete	ADR; 1; 6	ADR; 2; 4	MNZ; 1	MNZ; 2	ASS; 1	ASS; 2	BRN; 1	BRN; 2	IMO; 1	IMO; 2							9th	20
2016	444	(Austria) Philipp Sager	ADR; 1	ADR; 2	MNZ; 1	MNZ; 2	ASS; 1	ASS; 2	BRN; 1	BRN; 2	IMO; 1; 7	IMO; 2; 5							4th	34
2016	789	(Switzerland) Christof von Grünigen	ADR; 1	ADR; 2	MNZ; 1; 7	MNZ; 2; 4	ASS; 1 Ret	ASS; 2; 8	**BRN**; **1**; 3	BRN; 2 Ret	IMO; 1	IMO; 2							3rd	74

=== Complete TCR International Series results ===
(key) (Races in bold indicate pole position) (Races in italics indicate fastest lap)

Year	No.	Drivers	1	2	3	4	5	6	7	8	9	10	11	12	13	14	15	16	17	18	19	20	Pos	Points
2017	55	(Hungary) Ferenc Ficza	RIM; 1; 2	RIM; 2; 13	BHR; 1	BHR; 2	SPA; 1	SPA; 2	MNZ; 1	MNZ; 2	SAL; 1	SAL; 2	HUN; 1	HUN; 2	OSC; 1	OSC; 2	BUR; 1	BUR; 2	ZHE; 1	ZHE; 2	YMC; 1	YMC; 2	5th	21
