= Lola B05/52 =

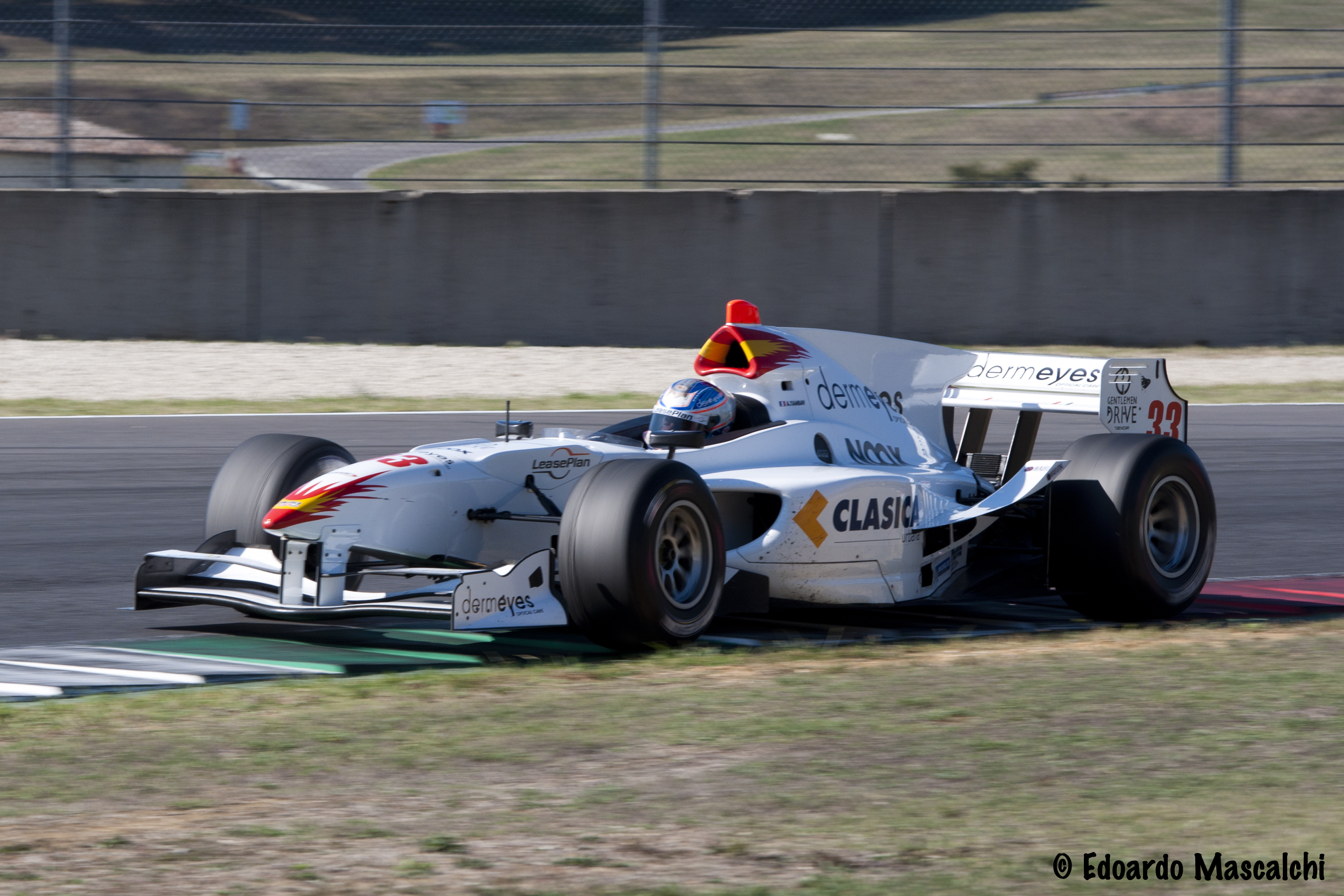
- The modified version for the Auto GP and Euroseries 3000, in 2009.
- Constructor: Lola

Technical specifications
- Length: 4,833 mm (190 in)
- Width: 1,476 mm (58 in)
- Wheelbase: 3,000 mm (118 in)
- Weight: 695 mm (27 in)

Competition history
- Debut: 2009 Portimão Euroseries 3000 round

Lola B05/52 is an open-wheel single-seater sports car developed by the British company Lola Racing Cars in 2005 and currently still in production.

== History ==
The car was conceived as the only car admitted to the newly created A1 Grand Prix series. It was used in the first three seasons of that championship, (from the 2005–2006 to 2007–08 season), before being replaced by a A1GP Powered by Ferrari car.

Subsequently, some changes were made to the rear wing and the nose and was introduced in the Euroseries 3000 championship from the 2009 season, before becoming the only single-seater allowed in the newborn Auto GP championship (at least until 2015), direct heir to the Euroseries.

In 2026 Italian team Team Cicar ran a pair of Lola B05/52s in the BOSS GP series powered by Ferrari 4.2 litre V8s.
